= Haninge Ladies Open =

Golf tournament in Sweden

Tournament information
- Location: Haninge, Stockholm, Sweden
- Established: 1986
- Course: Haninge Golf Club
- Par: 73
- Tours: Ladies European Tour (1990–1996); Swedish Golf Tour
- Format: Stroke play
- Prize fund: £125,000
- Final year: 1996

Final champion
- (Sweden) Annika Sörenstam

The Haninge Ladies Open was a women's professional golf tournament held at Haninge Golf Club near Stockholm in Sweden. The tournament ran for two years on the Swedish Golf Tour before being included on the Ladies European Tour between 1990 and 1996. It was known for sponsorship reasons as the IBM Ladies Open and Trygg Hansa Ladies Open.

== Winners ==
Year	Winner	Score	Margin of victory	Runner(s)-up	Prize fund (£)	Ref
Trygg Hansa Ladies Open
1996	(Sweden) Annika Sörenstam	279 (−13)	1 stroke	(England) Joanne Morley (England) Alison Nicholas	125,000	
1995	(Sweden) Liselotte Neumann	281 (−11)	1 stroke	(Sweden) Annika Sörenstam	115,000	
1994	(Sweden) Liselotte Neumann	274 (−18)	4 strokes	(Australia) Corinne Dibnah	100,000	
IBM Ladies Open
1993	(England) Lora Fairclough	280 (−12)	3 strokes	(Australia) Corinne Dibnah	100,000	
1992	(Sweden) Helen Alfredsson	278 (−14)	2 strokes	(Sweden) Liselotte Neumann	90,000	
1991	(Sweden) Liselotte Neumann	282 (−10)	3 strokes	(France) Marie-Laure de Lorenzi	80,000	
Haninge Ladies Open
1990	(Scotland) Dale Reid	291 (−1)	1 stroke	(Northern Ireland) Maureen Garner (England) Alison Nicholas (England) Suzanne Strudwick	70,000	
IBM Ladies Open
1989	(Sweden) Anna Oxenstierna	216 (−3)	9 strokes	(Sweden) Pia Nilsson	SEK 75,000	
1988	(Sweden) Sofia Grönberg-Whitmore	224 (+5)	2 strokes	(Sweden) Pia Nilsson	SEK 50,000	
1987	(Sweden) Pia Nilsson	215 (–1)	15 strokes	(Sweden) Gisela Cunningham (Sweden) Liv Wollin	SEK 50,000	
1986	(Sweden) Helene Koch	231 (+15)	1 stroke	(Sweden) Sofia Grönberg-Whitmore	SEK 50,000	

== See also ==
- Scandinavian TPC hosted by Annika
