= Royal Bercuit Golf Club =

Golf Club in Belgium

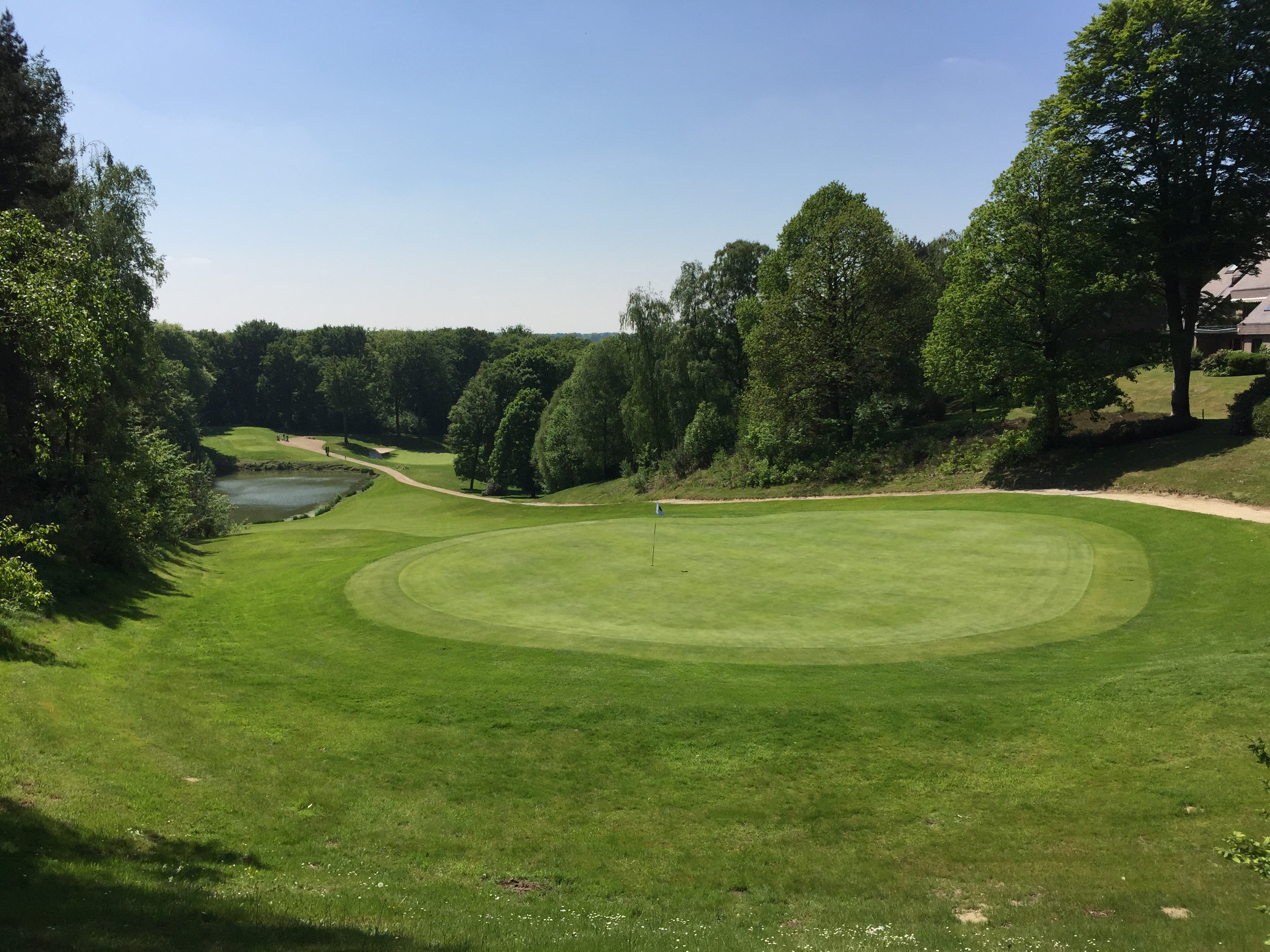
- The 13th hole at Bercuit
- Interactive map of Royal Bercuit Golf Club
- 50.719444°N 4.673611°E

Club information
- Location: Grez-Doiceau, Wallonia, Belgium
- Established: 1967
- Tota holes: 18
- Website: royalbercuitgolfclub.be

18 holes
- Designed by: Robert Trent Jones
- Par: 72
- Length: 5,974 m

Royal Bercuit Golf Club is located in Grez-Doiceau, Wallonia, 30 km southeast of Brussels. The only course in Belgium designed by Robert Trent Jones, it has hosted events on both the European Tour and the Ladies European Tour.

== History ==
In 1965, businessman and landowner Baron Frédéric Rolin began planning the construction of the golf course. Robert Trent Jones agreed to design the course and based on an American concept, the project included an 18 hole golf course and real estate development. Bercuit opened in 1967 and is the only Belgian golf course designed by Jones.

In 2017 the club was granted Royal status by King Philippe, an honor bestowed on its 50th anniversary.

== Tournaments hosted ==
Tour	Championship	Year	Winner
European Tour	Belgian Open	1988	(Spain) José María Olazábal
Ladies European Tour	Ladies European Masters	1989	(England) Kitrina Douglas
Ladies European Tour	Ladies European Masters	1990	(Australia) Karen Lunn
Ladies European Tour	Ladies European Masters	1991	(Australia) Corinne Dibnah
Ladies European Tour	Ladies European Masters	1992	(England) Kitrina Douglas
Ladies European Tour	Ladies European Masters	1993	(England) Helen Dobson
Ladies European Tour	Ladies European Masters	1994	(Wales) Helen Wadsworth
LET Access Series	Belfius Ladies Open	2018	(Sweden) Emma Nilsson

== See also ==
- List of golf clubs granted Royal status
- List of golf courses designed by Robert Trent Jones
