= Sunrise Cup World Team Championship =

1992 Sunrise Cup World Team Championship
Tournament information
- Dates: 16–18 October
- Location: Taipei, Taiwan
- Course(s): Sunrise G&CC
- Format: 54 holes stroke play combined score

Statistics
- Par: 72
- Field: 16 two-man teams
- Cut: None
- Prize fund: US$500,000

Champion
- Sweden; Liselotte Neumann & Helen Alfredsson
- 445 (+13)

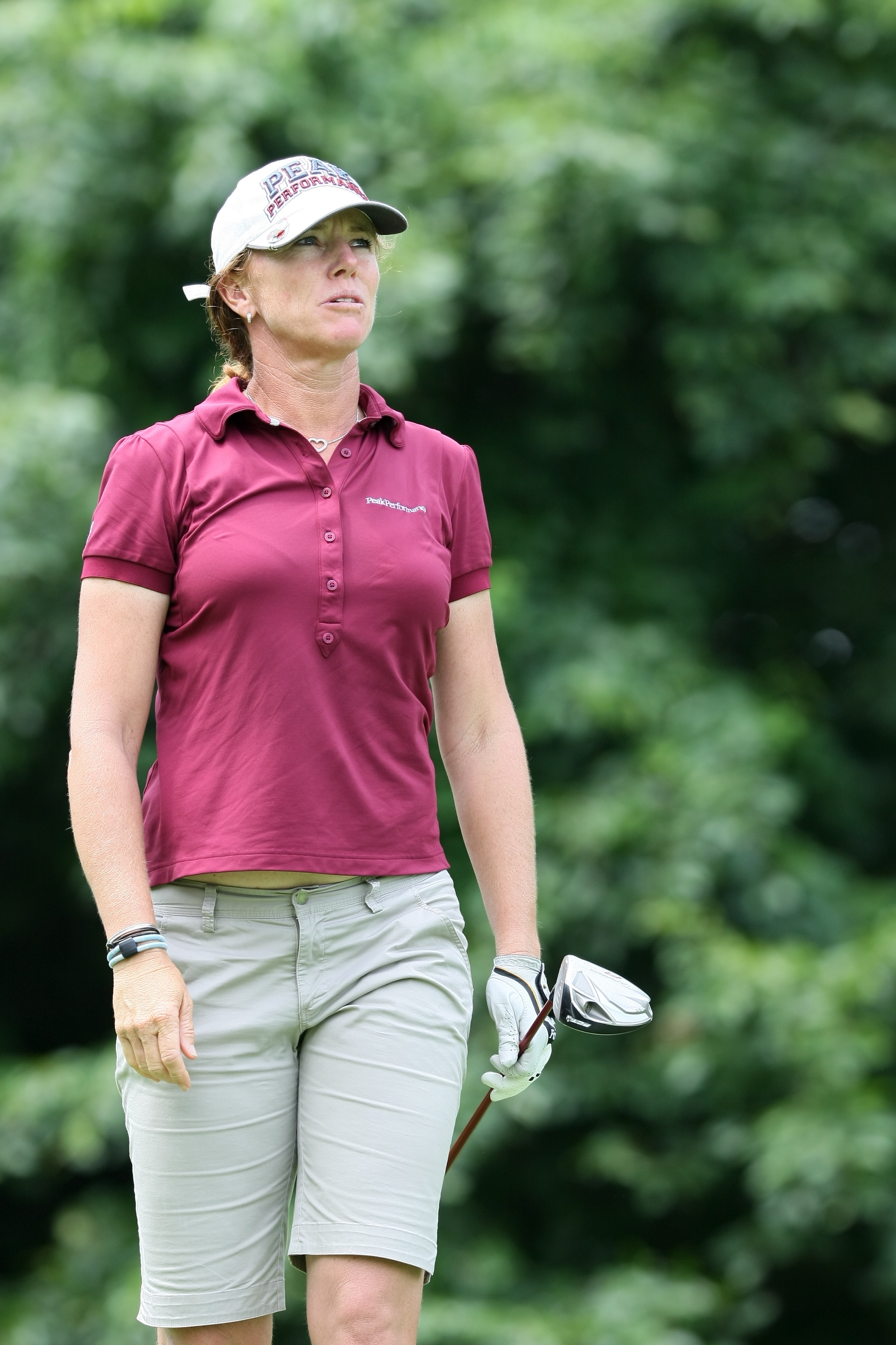
Helen Alfredsson won the title representing Sweden.

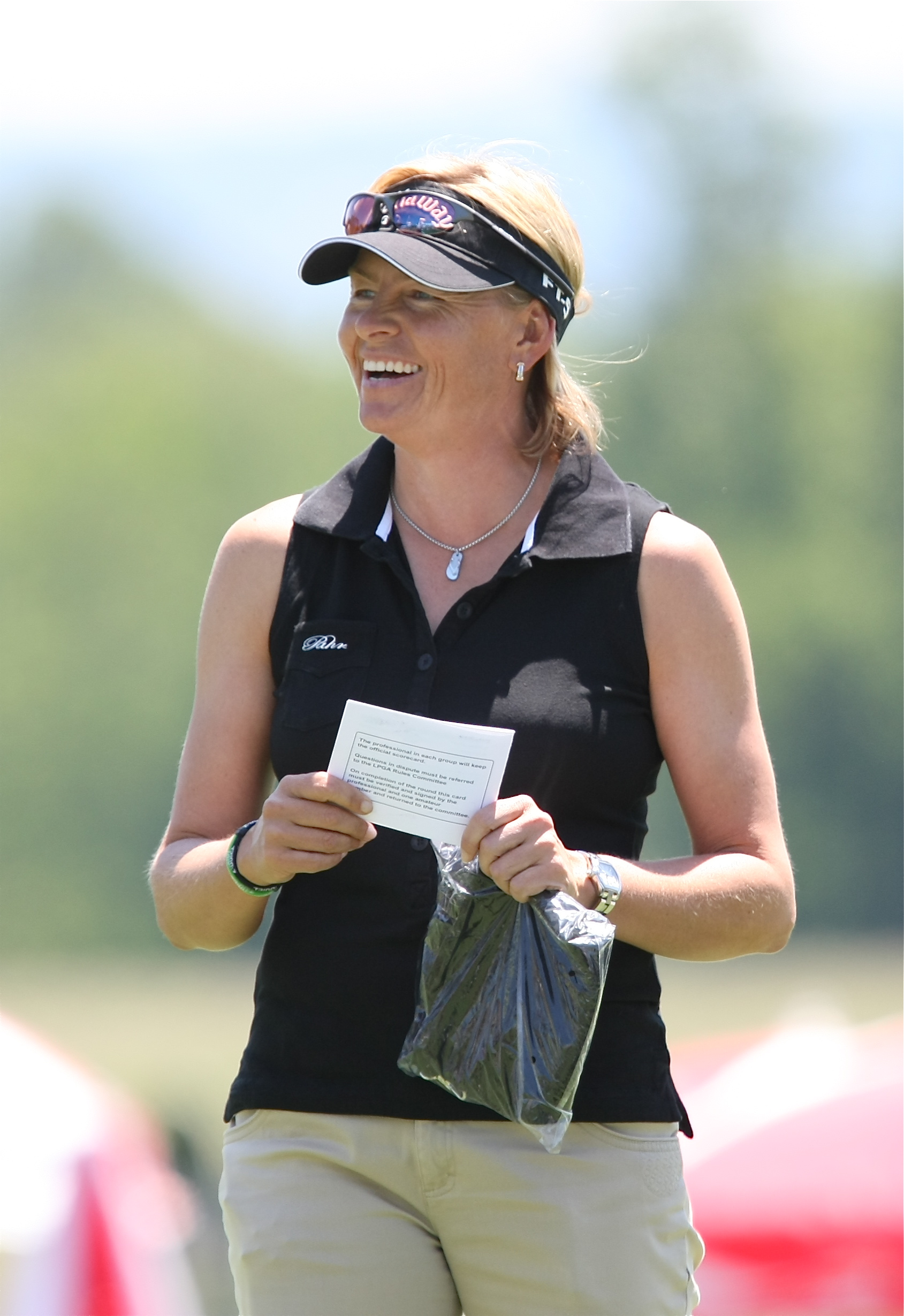
Liselotte Neumann won the title representing Sweden.

The Sunrise Cup World Team Championship was a professional golf tournament contested by teams of two female golfers representing their respective countries. The tournament was played at the Sunrise Golf & Country Club in Taiwan.

The field consisted of sixteen teams and each qualifying country could field one team. It was only held in October 1992 and was included on the Ladies European Tour schedule as an unofficial team event. It had a purse of $500,000.

Typhoon Yvette impacted play with extremely strong winds and delays.

== Winners ==
| Year | Country | Team | Runners-up | Third-place | Individual |
Sunrise Cup World Team Championship
| 1992 | Sweden | Liselotte Neumann & Helen Alfredsson | (England) Trish Johnson & Laura Davies | (United States) Jane Geddes & Meg Mallon | (England) Trish Johnson (Sweden) Liselotte Neumann |

== Scores ==
Team

| Place | Country | Players | | Score | To par |
|---|---|---|---|---|---|
| 1 | Sweden | Liselotte Neumann | Helen Alfredsson | 219+226=445 | +13 |
| 2 | England | Trish Johnson | Laura Davies | 219+228=447 | +15 |
| 3 | United States | Jane Geddes | Meg Mallon | 222+231=453 | +21 |
| 4 | Switzerland | Evelyn Orley | Régine Lautens | 221+233=454 | +22 |
| T5 | Canada | Dawn Coe-Jones | Lisa Walters | 228+231=459 | +27 |
| T5 | Australia | Jan Stephenson | Corinne Dibnah | 223+236=459 | +27 |
| 7 | Wales | Karen Davies | Helen Wadsworth | 232+232=464 | +32 |
| 8 | Peru | Jenny Lidback | Alicia Dibos | 231+234=465 | +33 |
| 9 | France | Marie-Laure de Lorenzi | Sandrine Mendiburu | 227+243=470 | +38 |
| 10 | Japan | Yuka Irie | Yuri Kawanami | 232+242=474 | +42 |

Individual Trophy

| Place | Player | Country | Score | To par | Money (US$) |
|---|---|---|---|---|---|
| T1 | Trish Johnson | England | 71-72-76=219 | +3 | 20,000 |
| T1 | Liselotte Neumann | Sweden | 71-70-78=219 | +3 | 20,000 |
| 3 | Evelyn Orley | Switzerland | 74-74-73=221 | +5 | 10,000 |
| T4 | Marta Figueras-Dotti | Spain | 72-73-77=222 | +6 | |
| T4 | Jane Geddes | United States | 74-72-76=222 | +6 | |
| 6 | Helen Alfredsson | Sweden | 75-76-75=226 | +7 | |

== See also ==
- Women's World Cup of Golf – the World Team Championship held 2005 to 2008.
