= 1995 Ladies European Tour =

Golf tour season

1995 Ladies European Tour season
- Duration: May 1995 – October 1995
- Number of official events: 18
- Order of Merit: (Sweden) Annika Sörenstam
- Player of the Year: (Sweden) Annika Sörenstam
- Rookie of the Year: (Australia) Karrie Webb
- Lowest stroke average: (Sweden) Annika Sörenstam

The 1995 Ladies European Tour was a series of golf tournaments for elite female golfers from around the world which took place in 1995. The tournaments were sanctioned by the Ladies European Tour (LET).

== Tournaments ==
The table below shows the 1995 schedule. The numbers in brackets after the winners' names show the number of career wins they had on the Ladies European Tour up to and including that event. This is only shown for members of the tour.

Date	Tournament	Venue	Location	Winner	Score	Margin of victory	Runner(s)-up	Note
13 May	Costa Azul Ladies Open	Troia and Montado GC	Portugal	(France) Marie-Laure de Lorenzi (16)	205	2 strokes	(Switzerland) Evelyn Orley	
21 May	Ford Golf Classic	Chart Hills	England	(England) Lora Fairclough (2)	277	1 stroke	(Belgium) Florence Descampe	
10 Jun	**Evian Masters**	Evian Resort Golf Club	France	(England) Laura Davies (19)	271	5 strokes	(Sweden) Annika Sörenstam	
18 Jun	OVB Damen Open Austria	Golf Glub Zell am See	Austria	(Sweden) Annika Sörenstam (1)	270	3 strokes	(England) Laura Davies	
25 Jun	Ladies European Masters	Cleydael	Belgium	(England) Lora Fairclough (3)	206	2 strokes	(Italy) Federica Dassù	
2 Jul	Hennessy Cup	Cologne	Germany	(Sweden) Annika Sörenstam (2)	271	1 stroke	(Sweden) Liselotte Neumann (England) Trish Johnson	
30 Jul	Guardian Irish Holidays Open	St. Margaret's	Ireland	(England) Laura Davies (20)	267	16 strokes	(Sweden) Åsa Gottmo	
6 Aug	Payne & Gunter Scottish Open	Dalmahoy	Scotland	(England) Alison Nicholas (11)	272	1 stroke	(France) Patricia Meunier-Lebouc	
13 Aug	Woodpecker Women's Welsh Open	St Pierre Golf & Country Club	Wales	(England) Laura Davies (21)	278	3 strokes	(Australia) Wendy Doolan	
20 Aug	**Weetabix Women's British Open**	Woburn Golf and Country Club	England	(Australia) Karrie Webb (1)	278	6 strokes	(Sweden) Annika Sörenstam (United States) Jill McGill	Co-sanctioned by the LPGA Tour
27 Aug	Ford-Stimorol Danish Open	Vejle Golf Club	Denmark	(England) Caroline Hall	201	8 strokes	(Australia) Corinne Dibnah	
3 Sep	Wilkinson Sword Ladies' English Open	The Oxfordshire Golf Club	England	(England) Laura Davies (22)	279	1 stroke	(Denmark) Karina Orum	
10 Sep	Trygg-Hansa Ladies' Open	Haninge GC, Stockholm	Sweden	(Sweden) Liselotte Neumann (11)	281	1 stroke	(Sweden) Annika Sörenstam	
17 Sep	Staatsloterij Ladies Open	Rijk van Nijmegen	Netherlands	(France) Marie-Laure de Lorenzi (17)	201	9 strokes	(England) Lora Fairclough	
24 Sep	Maredo German Open	Treudelberg GC, Hamburg	Germany	(Australia) Rachel Hetherington (1)	275	2 strokes	(England) Caroline Hall	
1 Oct	Italian Ladies' Open	Il Picciolo GC, Sicily	Italy	(Australia) Denise Booker	284	1 stroke	(Spain) Amaia Arruti	
15 Oct	Nestlé French Ladies Open	Saint-Endréol	France	(France) Marie-Laure de Lorenzi (18)	210	10 strokes	(Scotland) Kathryn Marshall (England) Alison Nicholas (England) Sally Prosser	
21 Oct	La Manga Spanish Open	La Manga	Spain	(Australia) Rachel Hetherington (2)	202	2 strokes	(France) Stephanie Dallongeville	

Major championships in bold.

== Order of Merit rankings ==
Rank	Player	Money (£)
1	(Sweden) Annika Sörenstam	130,324
2	(England) Laura Davies	100,697
3	(Australia) Karrie Webb	90,556
4	(England) Lora Fairclough	81,839
5	(France) Marie-Laure de Lorenzi	80,787
6	(England) Alison Nicholas	57,586
7	(England) Trish Johnson	52,464
8	(Australia) Corinne Dibnah	51,244
9	(Australia) Rachel Hetherington	46,591
10	(United States) Jill McGill	41,226

== See also ==
- 1995 LPGA Tour
