= 1994 Ladies European Tour =

Professional women's golf tour

1994 Ladies European Tour season
- Duration: N/A
- Number of official events: 15
- Order of Merit: (Sweden) Liselotte Neumann

The 1994 Ladies European Tour was a series of golf tournaments for elite female golfers from around the world which took place in 1994. The tournaments were sanctioned by the Ladies European Tour (LET).

== Tournaments ==
The table below shows the 1994 schedule. The numbers in brackets after the winners' names show the number of career wins they had on the Ladies European Tour up to and including that event. This is only shown for members of the tour.

Dates	Tournament	Venue	Location	Winner	Score	Margin of victory	Runner(s)-up	Note
24 Apr	Ford Golf Classic	Woburn Golf and Country Club	England	(Sweden) Catrin Nilsmark (1)	284	4 strokes	(England) Trish Johnson, (England) Joanne Morley	
22 May	Costa Azul Ladies Open	Montado Troia and Aroeira GC	Portugal	(France) Sandrine Mendiburu (1)	140	1 stroke	(England) Lora Fairclough	
12 Jun	**Evian Masters**	Evian Resort Golf Club	France	(Sweden) Helen Alfredsson (6)	287	3 strokes	(England) Lora Fairclough, (Australia) Sarah Gautrey	
26 Jun	OVB Damen Open Austria	Golf Glub Zell am See	Austria	(Belgium) Florence Descampe (6)	277	Playoff	(United States) Tracy Hanson	
26 Jun	BMW European Masters	Golf de Bercuit	Belgium	(Wales) Helen Wadsworth (1)	278	3 strokes	(United States) Tracy Hanson	
3 Jul	Hennessy Cup	Cologne	Germany	(Sweden) Liselotte Neumann (8)	277	1 stroke	(England) Alison Nicholas	
31 Jul	Holiday Ireland Women's Open	St. Margaret's	Ireland	(England) Laura Davies (17)	282	8 strokes	(Sweden) Carin Koch, (Wales) Helen Wadsworth	
7 Aug	The New Skoda Women's Scottish Open	Dalmahoy	Scotland	(England) Laura Davies (18)	278	1 stroke	(Denmark) Karina Ørum	
14 Aug	**Weetabix Women's British Open**	Woburn Golf and Country Club	England	(Sweden) Liselotte Neumann (9)	280	3 strokes	(United States) Dottie Mochrie, (Sweden) Annika Sörenstam	Co-sanctioned by the LPGA Tour
21 Aug	Trygg-Hansa Ladies' Open	Haninge GC, Stockholm	Sweden	(Sweden) Liselotte Neumann (10)	274	4 strokes	(Australia) Corinne Dibnah	
4 Sep	Waterford Dairies Ladies' English Open	Tytherington	England	(France) Patricia Meunier-Lebouc (1)	288	2 strokes	(France) Marie-Laure de Lorenzi, (Australia) Corinne Dibnah	
11 Sep	Sens Ladies' Dutch Open	Rijk van Nijmegen	Netherlands	(Netherlands) Liz Weima (1)	214	2 strokes	(Sweden) Sofia Grönberg-Whitmore	
25 Sep	BMW Italian Ladies' Open	Lignano	Italy	(Australia) Corinne Dibnah (13)	277	Playoff	(Scotland) Dale Reid	
2 Oct	La Manga Spanish Open	La Manga	Spain	(France) Marie-Laure de Lorenzi (15)	282	Playoff	(Sweden) Sofia Grönberg-Whitmore	
16 Oct	VAR Open de France Dames	Saint-Endréol	France	(Scotland) Julie Forbes (1)	213	Playoff	(Scotland) Dale Reid, (England) Suzanne Strudwick	

Major championships in bold.

== Order of Merit rankings ==
Rank	Player	Prize money (£)
1	(Sweden) Liselotte Neumann	102,750
2	(Sweden) Helen Alfredsson	63,315
3	(England) Laura Davies	59,384
4	(Sweden) Annika Sörenstam	58,360
5	(Australia) Corinne Dibnah	57,040
6	(England) Lora Fairclough	44,585
7	(United States) Tracy Hanson	44,205
8	(Wales) Helen Wadsworth	41,979
9	(England) Alison Nicholas	38,550
10	(Denmark) Karina Ørum	34,613

== See also ==
- 1994 LPGA Tour
