= Women's English Open =

Tournament information
- Location: Manchester, England
- Established: 1991
- Course: Manchester Golf Club
- Par: 72
- Tours: Ladies European Tour; LET Access Series
- Format: 54-hole Stroke play
- Prize fund: €80,000
- Month played: July

Tournament record score
- Aggregate: 197 Maria Hjorth
- To par: –19 as above

Current champion
- (Czech Republic) Tereza Koželuhová

Location map
- Location in England Location in Greater Manchester

The Women's English Open is a women's professional national open golf championship held in England. It was an event on the Ladies European Tour between 1991 and 2008, before returning as an LET Access Series event in 2026.

== History ==
The tournament was first held as the Ladies English Open between 1991 and 1996, when it was dominated by Laura Davies who won four of the six tournaments played. It was re-established in 2004 and held annually until 2008, during which time it was contested over three rounds, as opposed to four, and as such had one of the lowest prize funds on the tour.

In 2026, England Golf announced the tournament's return as a Ladies European Tour Access Series (LETAS) event, with the long-term ambition to re-establish the event on the Ladies European Tour (LET).

== Winners ==
Year	Tour	Winner	Country	Score	Margin of victory	Runner(s)-up	Purse (£)	Venue
Women's English Open
2026	LETAS	Tereza Koželuhová	Czech Republic	204 (−12)	1 stroke	(United Arab Emirates) Hyeonji Kang	€80,000	Manchester
2009–2025: No tournament
The Oxfordshire Ladies English Open
2008	LET	Rebecca Hudson	England	206 (−10)	1 stroke	(England) Mel Reid	€165,000	Oxfordshire
Golf Punk Ladies English Open
2007	LET	Becky Brewerton	Wales	209 (−7)	3 strokes	(Sweden) Linda Wessberg (England) Kirsty Taylor (England) Karen Stupples	€165,000	Chart Hills
BBC Radio Kent Ladies English Open
2006	LET	Cecilia Ekelundh	Sweden	210 (−6)	1 stroke	(Germany) Martina Eberl	€165,000	Chart Hills
Ladies English Open
2005	LET	Maria Hjorth (2)	Sweden	204 (−12)	1 stroke	(Finland) Minea Blomqvist	€165,000	Chart Hills
2004	LET	Maria Hjorth	Sweden	197 (−19)	6 strokes	(Australia) Joanne Mills	€165,000	Chart Hills
1997–2003: No tournament
Wilkinson Sword Ladies English Open
1996	LET	Laura Davies (4)	England	273 (−15)	4 strokes	(Sweden) Helen Alfredsson	100,000	Oxfordshire
1995	LET	Laura Davies (3)	England	279 (−9)	1 stroke	(Denmark) Karina Ørum	90,000	Oxfordshire
Waterford Dairies Ladies English Open
1994	LET	Patricia Meunier-Lebouc	France	288 (E)	2 strokes	(France) Marie-Laure de Lorenzi (Australia) Corinne Dibnah	60,000	Tytherington
1993	LET	Laura Davies (2)	England	277 (−11)	1 stroke	(France) Marie-Laure de Lorenzi	60,000	Tytherington
Ladies English Open
1992	LET	Laura Davies	England	281 (−11)	7 strokes	(Spain) Tania Abitbol (France) Marie-Laure de Lorenzi (Australia) Corinne Dibnah (England) Alison Nicholas	50,000	Tytherington
1991	LET	Kitrina Douglas	England	285 (−3)	Playoff	(Switzerland) Evelyn Orley	75,000	Tytherington
