= 1992 Ladies European Tour =

Professional women's golf tour

1992 Ladies European Tour season
- Duration: March 1992 – October 1992
- Number of official events: 12
- Order of Merit: (England) Laura Davies
- Rookie of the Year: (France) Sandrine Mendiburu
- Lowest stroke average: (England) Laura Davies

The 1992 Ladies European Tour was a series of golf tournaments for elite female golfers from around the world which took place in 1992. The tournaments were sanctioned by the Ladies European Tour (LET).

== Tournaments ==
The table below shows the 1992 schedule. The numbers in brackets after the winners' names show the number of career wins they had on the Ladies European Tour up to and including that event. This is only shown for members of the tour.

Dates	Tournament	Location	Winner	Margin of victory	Runner(s)-up	Note	Purse (£)	Winner's share (£)
3 May	Ford Ladies Classic	England	(Italy) Stefania Croce (1)	3 strokes	(England) Trish Johnson, (Switzerland) Evelyn Orley		65,000	9,750
7 May	AGF Ladies' Open de Paris	France	(England) Alison Nicholas (9)	1 stroke	(Peru) Alicia Dibos		80,000	12,000
24 May	BMW European Masters	Belgium	(England) Kitrina Douglas (8)	1 stroke	(England) Trish Johnson		140,000	21,000
31 May	Skol La Manga Club Classic	Spain	(England) Trish Johnson (8)	1 stroke	(Belgium) Florence Descampe, (Sweden) Catrin Nilsmark		60,000	9,000
28 Jun	European Ladies Open	Germany	(England) Laura Davies (13)	2 strokes	(Sweden) Catrin Nilsmark		100,000	15,000
12 Jul	Hennessy Ladies Cup	Germany	(Sweden) Helen Alfredsson (4)	1 stroke	(England) Trish Johnson		120,000	18,000
2 Aug	Ladies English Open	England	(England) Laura Davies (14)	7 strokes	(Spain) Tania Abitbol, (France) Marie-Laure de Lorenzi, (Australia) Corinne Dibnah, (England) Alison Nicholas		50,000	7,500
23 Aug	Holiday Inn Leiden Ladies' Open	Netherlands	(France) Valerie Michaud (1)	1 stroke	(England) Laura Davies		55,000	8,250
30 Aug	IBM Ladies Open	Sweden	(Sweden) Helen Alfredsson (5)	2 strokes	(Sweden) Liselotte Neumann		90,000	13,500
20 Sep	BMW Italian Ladies' Open	Italy	(England) Laura Davies (15)	5 strokes	(France) Sandrine Mendiburu		110,000	16,500
27 Sep	**Weetabix Women's British Open**	England	(United States) Patty Sheehan	3 strokes	(Australia) Corinne Dibnah		300,000	50,000
11 Oct	Slovenian Ladies Open	Slovenia	(Australia) Karen Lunn (4)	4 strokes	(Australia) Helen Hopkins, (England) Allison Shapcott		70,000	10,500
18 Oct	Sunrise Cup; World Team Championship	Taiwan	Sweden (Helen Alfredsson & Liselotte Neumann)	12 strokes	England (Laura Davies & Trish Johnson)	Unofficial team event	$500,000	
22 Oct	Mobil Ladies Challenge	UAE	(Scotland) Dale Reid (n/a)	1 stroke	(Scotland) Catherine Panton-Lewis	Unofficial event; limited field	20,000	5,000

Major championships in bold.

== Order of Merit rankings ==
Rank	Player	Prize money (£)
1	(England) Laura Davies	66,333
2	(Sweden) Helen Alfredsson	55,900
3	(Australia) Corinne Dibnah	53,211
4	(England) Trish Johnson	51,805
5	(Sweden) Catrin Nilsmark	35,728
6	(France) Marie-Laure de Lorenzi	34,921
7	(Sweden) Liselotte Neumann	34,201
8	(England) Alison Nicholas	31,584
9	(England) Kitrina Douglas	31,511
10	(France) Sandrine Mendiburu	26,896

== See also ==
- 1992 LPGA Tour
