= Liselotte Neumann =

Swedish professional golfer (born 1966)

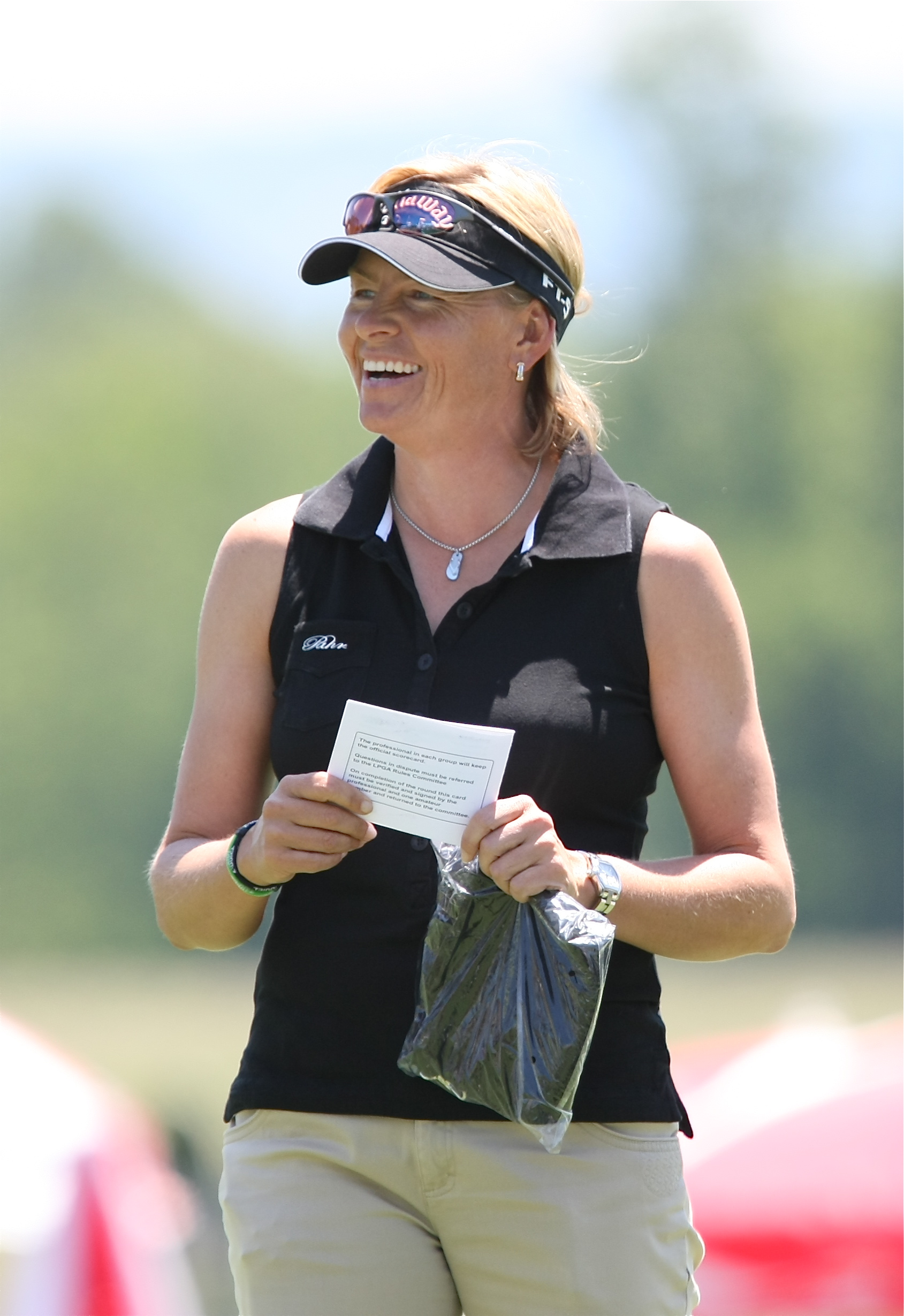
- Neumann in 2008

Personal information
- Full name: Liselotte Maria Neumann
- Nickname: Lotta
- Nationality: Sweden
- Born: 20 May 1966 (age 60) Finspång, Sweden
- Height: 5 ft 7 in (1.70 m)
- Life partner: Evelyn Orley

Career
- Sport: Golf
- Turned professional: 1985
- Current tour: Legends Tour
- Former tours: LPGA Tour (1988–2010); Ladies European Tour (Lifetime Member)
- Professional wins: 37

Number of wins by tour
- LPGA Tour: 13
- Ladies European Tour: 11
- LPGA of Japan Tour: 5
- Ladies Asian Golf Tour: 1
- WPGA Tour of Australasia: 1
- Other: 9

Best results in LPGA major championships (wins: 1)
- Chevron Championship: 2nd: 2002
- Women's PGA C'ship: 2nd/T2: 1992, 1999
- U.S. Women's Open: Won: 1988
- du Maurier Classic: 2nd: 1995, 1997
- Women's British Open: T5: 2005

Achievements and awards
- LPGA Tour Rookie of the Year: 1988
- Ladies European Tour Order of Merit: 1994
- Vivien Saunders Trophy (LET scoring ave.): 1994
- Swedish Golfer of the Year: 1985, 1988, 1994

Liselotte Maria "Lotta" Neumann (born 20 May 1966) is a Swedish professional golfer. When she recorded her first LPGA Tour win, by claiming the 1988 U.S. Women's Open title, Neumann also became the first Swedish golfer, male or female, to win a major championship.

== Early life ==
In 1966, Neumann was born and grew up in Finspång, Sweden. Her father Rune was a former football player and coach of a local girls football team. After practicing different sports and supported by her father, her mother Ingegerd and her brother Mats, Neumann began playing golf at the local 9-hole course at Finspång Golf Club.

Neumann showed early promise and won the unofficial national youth championships, Colgate Cup, at three different levels, as a 12, 14, and 16-year-old. Neumann has later given a lot of credit, for her successful career, to her local coach since her early years, Pierre Karlström. Neumann also has showed her loyalty to her first golf club by, three times during the peak of her career in the 1990s, inviting some of the female golf stars of the world, Laura Davies, Karrie Webb, Kelly Robbins and Jane Geddes among others, for exhibition matches in Finspång.

== Amateur career ==
In 1981, only 15 years of age, she sensationally won the Swedish International Amateur Stroke-Play Championship, one of three major amateur tournaments in Sweden at the time, at Jönköping Golf Club, with a record aggregate of 282 and a 9-stroke margin. She bettered her personal 72-hole best with 30 strokes and beat the whole Swedish amateur national team, some of whom had not even heard of Neumann before the tournament. At the time of her triumph, she wasn't even qualified for the Swedish national junior team, which, the same summer, won the European Lady Junior's Team Championship.

The year after, she successfully defended her stroke-play title and, at 16 years old, was a member of the national team at the Espirito Santo Trophy in Geneva, Switzerland. In 1983, she finished second in Orange Bowl International Junior Championship in Coral Gables, Florida. In 1984, she was the Swedish Match Play champion (tournament for first time open for professionals), member of the winning Swedish team at the European Lady Junior's Team Championship at Campo de Golf El Saler, Valencia, Spain, and medalist at the 36-hole qualifying competition in the European Ladies Team Championship, in Waterloo, Belgium. After another appearance at the Espirito Santo Trophy in Hong Kong in late 1984, she turned professional at the beginning of 1985, not yet 19 years old.

== Professional career ==
=== Ladies European Tour ===
In 1985, Neumann turned professional. She collected her first professional win at the Pierre Robert Cup, over 54 holes at Falsterbo Golf Club, in Sweden in May 1985 and played on the Ladies European Tour (at the time named the WPGA Tour) the second half of the year, where she won twice. At the Höganäs Ladies Open at Mölle Golf Club in Sweden, she became the youngest ever winner on the WPGA Tour.

She led the 1986 Ladies European Tour Order of Merit for most of the season, with eight straight top three finishes, but lost the lead to Laura Davies at the last tournament, the Spanish Open. While Davies won the tournament, Neumann finished 27th, her worst of the season. In the rankings, Neumann finished second, earning £494 less than Davies. The same year the ladies' Swedish Golf Tour get started with seven tournaments and Neumann was its first Order of Merit winner.

=== LPGA Tour ===
Neumann became a member of the LPGA Tour in 1988, after tying fourth at the LPGA Tour Final Qualifying Tournament in late 1987.

At the 1988 U.S. Women's Open at Baltimore Country Club, Five Farms, Baltimore, Maryland, July 21–24, at 22 years of age, Neumann led wire-to-wire in just her 16th LPGA Tour tournament, setting a new tournament first-round record 67 and 72-hole record 277, becoming the first Swedish major winner, male or female, as well as the first Swedish tournament winner on the LPGA Tour or the PGA Tour. She became the fifth non-U.S.-winner and the second youngest (by two months to Catherine Lacoste in 1967) in the 43-year history of the championship. She was voted 1988 LPGA Tour Rookie of the Year and earned her second Swedish Golfer of the Year award.

In total she won thirteen times on the LPGA Tour. The 1988 U.S. Women's Open remains her only LPGA major, but she won the Women's British Open in 1994, when it was recognised as a major championship by the Ladies European Tour, but not by the LPGA Tour. She also finished second five times in three other major championships.

Her best finish on the LPGA Tour money list is third in 1994. She also finished top ten in 1996, 1997 and 1998.

Throughout her career on the LPGA Tour, she continued to play on the Ladies European Tour, as well as in Asia and Australia. She won five times in Japan and the 1995 Women's Australian Open. Her victory in the 1994 Women's British Open made her the fifth player to win both British and U.S. Open titles, joining Laura Davies, Jane Geddes, Betsy King and Patty Sheehan. This accomplishment was later also achieved by Alison Nicholas, Pak Se-ri, Karrie Webb, Inbee Park and Ariya Jutanugarn. In 1994 Neumann topped the LET Order of Merit, was voted Golf World's Most Improved Golfer and awarded Swedish Golfer of the Year for the third time.

Neumann played in the European Solheim Cup team against United States, six times in a row: in 1990, 1992, 1994, 1996, 1998, and 2000. She captained the team to victory in August, 2013 at Colorado Golf Club in Parker, Colorado, the first time team Europe won the cup on foreign soil, and the first time Europe won consecutive cups. Neumann won the Women's World Cup of Golf for Sweden in 2006 with Annika Sörenstam.

== Awards and honors ==
- In 1984, Neumann earned Elite Sign No. 78 by the Swedish Golf Federation, on the basis of national team appearances and national championship performances.
- She was appointed 1988 Swedish Sportswomen of the Year by newspaper Aftonbladet and the Swedish Sports Confederation.
- Besides being awarded Swedish Golfer of the Year three times, 1985, 1988 and 1994, Neumann received the Golden Club by the Swedish Golf Federation in 1998, as the tenth person, for great contributions to Swedish golf.
- In 1998, she also became an honorary member of the PGA of Sweden.
- She was recognized during the LPGA's 50th Anniversary in 2000 as one of the LPGA's top 50 players and teachers.
- On 7 June 2006, the Ladies European Tour announced that Neumann has earned Lifetime Membership of the LET, at the time a feat achieved by six other golfers, Helen Alfredsson, Laura Davies, Marie-Laure de Lorenzi, Alison Nicholas, Dale Reid and Annika Sorenstam.
- In May 2022, Neumann was elected, as its fourth inductee, decided by the board of the Swedish Golf Federation, into the Swedish Golf Hall of Fame, inaugurated the same year.

== Amateur wins ==
- 1981 Swedish International Stroke-play Championship
- 1982 Swedish Junior Stroke-play Championship, Swedish International Stroke-play Championship, Scandinavian Foursome (with Signe Lindfeldt), Dunlop Open (Täby GC)

== Professional wins (37) ==
=== LPGA Tour wins (13) ===
Legend
LPGA Tour major championships (1)
Other LPGA Tour (12)

No.	Date	Tournament	Winning score	Margin of victory	Runner(s)-up
1	24 Jul 1988	**U.S. Women's Open**	−7 (67-72-69-69=277)	3 strokes	(United States) Patty Sheehan
2	10 Nov 1991	Mazda Japan Classic^{1}	−5 (70-72-69=211)	2 strokes	(United States) Caroline Keggi (United States) Dottie Pepper
3	12 Jun 1994	Minnesota LPGA Classic	−11 (68-71-66=205)	2 strokes	(Japan) Hiromi Kobayashi
4	12 Aug 1994	Women's British Open^{2}	−14 (71-67-70-72=280)	3 strokes	(United States) Dottie Pepper (Sweden) Annika Sörenstam
5	2 Oct 1994	GHP Heartland Classic	−10 (70-71-67-70=278)	3 strokes	(United States) Elaine Crosby (United States) Pearl Sinn
6	14 Jan 1996	Chrysler-Plymouth Tournament of Champions	−13 (67-66-72-70=275)	11 strokes	(Australia) Karrie Webb
7	17 Mar 1996	PING/Welch's Championship (Tucson)	−12 (68-71-69-68=276)	1 stroke	(United States) Cathy Johnston-Forbes
8	6 Jun 1996	Edina Realty LPGA Classic	−9 (67-73-67=207)	Playoff	(United States) Brandie Burton (Sweden) Carin Koch (England) Suzanne Strudwick
9	21 Sep 1997	Welch's Championship	−12 (67-70-69-70=276)	3 strokes	(Canada) Nancy Harvey
10	9 Nov 1997	Toray Japan Queens Cup^{1}	−11 (68-70-67=205)	1 stroke	(Canada) Lorie Kane
11	22 Mar 1998	Standard Register PING	−13 (69-67-69-74=279)	Playoff	(United States) Rosie Jones
12	26 Apr 1998	Chick-fil-A Charity Championship	−14 (67-65-70=202)	3 strokes	(Canada) Lori Kane (United States) Dottie Pepper
13	10 Oct 2004	Asahi Ryokuken International Championship	−15 (68-68-69-68=273)	3 strokes	(South Korea) Grace Park

LPGA Tour playoff record (2–2)

No.	Year	Tournament	Opponent(s)	Result
1	1988	Mazda Japan Classic^{1}	(United States) Patty Sheehan	Lost to birdie on third extra hole
2	1996	Oldsmobile Classic	(United States) Michelle McGann	Lost to birdie on third extra hole
3	1996	Edina Realty LPGA Classic	(United States) Brandie Burton (Sweden) Carin Koch (England) Suzanne Strudwick	Won with birdie on third extra hole
4	1998	Standard Register PING	(United States) Rosie Jones	Won with birdie on third extra hole

Major championships is shown in bold.

=== Ladies European Tour wins (11) ===
Legend
LET major championships (1)
Other LET (10)

No.	Date	Tournament	Winning score	Margin of victory	Runner(s)-up
1	25 Aug 1985	Höganäs Ladies Open	−1 (67-74-71-71=283)	1 stroke	(England) Laura Davies
2	7 Sep 1985	IBM Ladies' European Open	−2 (73-70-75-72=290)	2 strokes	(England) Susan Moorcraft (England) Cathy Panton
3	10 Aug 1986	BMW Ladies' German Open (1)	−6 (71-72-72-67=282)	2 strokes	(England) Alison Nicholas
4	17 May 1987	Letting French Open	−7 (71-77-72-73=293)	5 strokes	(England) Laura Davies
5	29 May 1988	BMW Ladies' German Open (2)	+2 (74-71-71-71=290)	1 stroke	(France) Marie-Laure de Lorenzi
6	18 Aug 1991	IBM Ladies' Open (1)	−10 (69-70-69-74=282)	3 strokes	(France) Marie-Laure de Lorenzi
7	4 Jul 1993	Hennessy Ladies' Cup (1)	−8 (72-71-69-68=280)	Playoff	(England) Laura Davies
8	3 Jul 1994	Hennessy Ladies' Cup (2)	−11 (69-71-72-65=277)	1 stroke	(England) Alison Nicholas
9	12 Aug 1994	Women's British Open^{2}	−14 (71-67-70-72=280)	3 strokes	(United States) Dottie Pepper (Sweden) Annika Sörenstam
10	21 Aug 1994	Trygg Hansa Ladies' Open (2)	−18 (69-67-71-67=274)	4 strokes	(Australia) Corinne Dibnah
11	10 Sep 1995	Trygg Hansa Ladies' Open (3)	−11 (70-71-68-72=281)	1 stroke	(Sweden) Annika Sörenstam

Ladies European Tour playoff record (1–1)

No.	Year	Tournament	Opponent(s)	Result
1	1993	Hennessy Ladies Cup	(England) Laura Davies	Won with birdie on first extra hole
2	1996	Hennessy Cup	(Sweden) Helen Alfredsson (England) Trish Johnson	Lost after eliminated on first extra hole Alfredsson won with birdie on second extra hole

Note: Neumann won the Women's British Open once after it was co-sanctioned by the LPGA Tour in 1994, but before it was recognized as a major championship on the LPGA Tour in 2001.

=== LPGA of Japan Tour wins (5) ===
No.	Date	Tournament	Winning score	Margin of victory	Runner(s)-up
1	10 Nov 1991	Mazda Japan Classic^{1}	−5 (70-72-69=211)	2 strokes	(United States) Caroline Keggi (United States) Dottie Pepper
2	10 Oct 1993	Treasure Invitational	−10 (69-70-70-69=278)	5 strokes	(United States) Juli Inkster
3	12 Oct 1997	Takara World Invitational	−6 (69-68-73-72=282)	2 strokes	(Japan) Yuko Motoyama
4	9 Nov 1997	Toray Japan Queens Cup^{1}	−11 (68-70-67=205)	1 stroke	(Canada) Lorie Kane
5	10 May 1998	Gunze Cup World Ladies	−6 (75-70-65-72=282)	Playoff	(South Korea) Ko Woo-soon (South Korea) Lee Young-mee

LPGA of Japan Tour playoff record (1–1)

No.	Year	Tournament	Opponent(s)	Result
1	1988	Mazda Japan Classic^{1}	(United States) Patty Sheehan	Lost to birdie on third extra hole
2	1998	Gunze Cup World Ladies Golf Tournament	(South Korea) Ko Woo-soon (South Korea) Lee Young-mee	Won with par on third extra hole

=== ALPG Tour wins (1) ===
No.	Date	Tournament	Winning score	Margin of victory	Runners-up
1	12 Nov 1995	Holden Women's Australian Open	−9 (67-74-71-71=283)	Playoff	(United States) Jane Geddes (Sweden) Annika Sörenstam

ALPG Tour playoff record (1–0)

No.	Year	Tournament	Opponent(s)	Result
1	1995	Holden Women's Australian Open	(United States) Jane Geddes (Sweden) Annika Sörenstam	Won with birdie on third extra hole Geddes eliminated by birdie on second extra hole

=== Ladies Asian Golf Circuit wins (1) ===
No.	Date	Tournament	Winning score	Margin of victory	Runners-up
1	28 Feb 1987	Singapore Ladies Open	−2 (71-75-68=214)	5 strokes	(Japan) Fusako Nagata (England) Beverley New

=== Other wins (5) ===
No.	Date	Tournament	Winning score	Margin of victory	Runner(s)-up
1	1984	Swedish Match-play Championship (as an amateur)	2 and 1		(Sweden) Catarina Lindvall
2	18 May 1985	Pierre Robert Cup (Sweden)	+16 (76-76-80=232)	2 strokes	(Sweden) Liselotte Bergendahl
3	18 Oct 1992	Sunrise Cup World Team Championship (team with (Sweden) Helen Alfredsson)	+13 (146-146-153=445)	2 strokes	England − Laura Davies / Trish Johnson
4	18 Oct 1992	Sunrise Cup World Team Championship (individual)	+3 (71-70-78=219)	shared with (England) Trish Johnson	
5	22 Jan 2006	Women's World Cup of Golf (with (Sweden) Annika Sörenstam)^{3}	−7 (65-69-77-70=281)	3 strokes	Scotland − Catriona Matthew / Janice Moodie

Notes

- ^{1}Co-sanctioned by the LPGA Tour and the Japan LPGA Tour
- ^{2}Co-sanctioned by the LPGA Tour and the Ladies European Tour
- ^{3}Team event recognised by all the main women's tours, but not an official money event

=== Legends Tour wins (4) ===
No.	Date	Tournament	Winning score	Margin of victory	Runner-up
1	May 4, 2014	Walgreens Charity Classic	−7 (69-68=137)	Playoff	(United States) Danielle Ammaccapane
2	Nov 7, 2015	Walgreens Charity Championship	−8 (68-68=136)	3 strokes	(United States) Nicole Jeray
3	May 21, 2017	Red Nose Day Walgreens Charity Championship	−4 (68)	1 stroke	(United States) Juli Inkster
4	Mar 25, 2018	ANA Inspiration Legends Day (with Kynadie Adams and Hailey Borja)	−10 (62)	1 stroke	(France) Patricia Meunier-Lebouc (with Ashley Menne and Yujeong Son)

== Major championships ==
=== Wins (1) ===
Year	Championship	Winning score	Margin	Runner-up
1988	U.S. Women's Open	−7 (67-72-69-69=277)	3 strokes	(United States) Patty Sheehan

=== Results timeline ===
Tournament	1987	1988	1989
Kraft Nabisco Championship	CUT		T28
LPGA Championship			T10
U.S. Women's Open	CUT	1	T20
du Maurier Classic		CUT	CUT

Tournament	1990	1991	1992	1993	1994	1995	1996	1997	1998	1999	2000
Kraft Nabisco Championship	CUT	T30	T26	T40	T11	T32	T10	T16	T5	T58	72
LPGA Championship	T27	T11	T2	T25	T3	T38	T41	CUT	T37	2	CUT
U.S. Women's Open	T54	T15	15	62	3	T21	T8	T14	3	T17	CUT
du Maurier Classic	4	T19	T20	CUT	3	2	T6	2	T48	T34	CUT

Tournament	2001	2002	2003	2004	2005	2006	2007	2008	2009	2010
Kraft Nabisco Championship	T18	2	T42		T55	T45	T61	T15	CUT	
LPGA Championship	T12	T52	T67	CUT	T31	T29	68	T29	CUT	WD
U.S. Women's Open	T39	T37	CUT	T20	T19	CUT	CUT	CUT		
Women's British Open ^	55	T35	CUT	CUT	T5	T31	CUT			

^ The Women's British Open replaced the du Maurier Classic as an LPGA major in 2001.

Win
Top 10
Did not play

CUT = missed the half-way cut.
WD = withdrew
"T" tied.

=== Summary ===
Tournament	Wins	2nd	3rd	Top-5	Top-10	Top-25	Events	Cuts made
Kraft Nabisco Championship	0	1	0	2	3	7	21	18
LPGA Championship	0	2	1	3	4	7	22	17
U.S. Women's Open	1	0	2	3	4	12	22	16
du Maurier Classic	0	2	1	4	5	7	13	9
Women's British Open	0	0	0	1	1	1	7	4
Totals	1	5	4	13	17	34	85	64

- Most consecutive cuts made – 14 (1988 U.S. Open – 1993 U.S. Open)
- Longest streak of top-10s – 3 (1994 LPGA – 1994 du Maurier Classic)

== LPGA Tour career summary ==
Year	Wins (Majors)	Earnings ($)	Money list rank	Average
1988	1 (1)	188,729	12	72.44
1989	0	119,915	30	72.66
1990	0	82,323	51	73.74
1991	1	151,367	27	72.91
1992	0	225,667	21	72.00
1993	0	90,776	57	72.54
1994	3	505,701	3	71.46
1995	0	305,157	16	71.79
1996	3	625,633	4	70.94
1997	2	497,841	7	71.28
1998	2	665,069	5	71.15
1999	0	405,142	20	71.70
2000	0	185,309	48	72.96
2001	0	159,719	61	72.40
2002	0	295,225	32	72.37
2003	0	108,379	71	72.39
2004	1	275,352	43	72.13
2005	0	607,474	22	71.47
2006	0	197,785	64	72.44
2007	0	103,486	84	73.55
2008	0	53,285	134	74.58
2009	0	0		76.24
2010	0	0		78.27

== Team appearances ==
Amateur

- European Lady Junior's Team Championship (representing Sweden): 1982, 1983, 1984 (winners)
- Espirito Santo Trophy (representing Sweden): 1982, 1984
- European Ladies' Team Championship (representing Sweden): 1983
- Vagliano Trophy (representing Continent of Europe): 1983

Professional

- Solheim Cup (representing Europe): 1990, 1992 (winners), 1994, 1996, 1998, 2000 (winners), 2013 (winners, non-playing captain)
- World Cup (representing Sweden): 2006 (winners)
- Handa Cup (representing World team): 2011, 2013 (winners), 2014, 2015

=== Solheim Cup record ===
Year	Total matches	Total W–L–H	Singles W–L–H	Foursomes W–L–H	Fourballs W–L–H	Points won	Points %
Career	21	6–10–5	2–2–2	1–6–1	3–2–2	8.5	40.5%
1990	3	1–2–0	0–1–0 lost to B. Daniel 7&6	0–1–0 lost w/P. Wright 6&5	1–0–0 won w/P. Wright 4&2	1	33.3%
1992	3	2–0–1	1–0–0 def B. King 2&1	1–0–0 won w/H. Alfredsson 2&1	0–0–1 halved H. Alfredsson	2.5	83.3%
1994	3	1–2–0	0–1–0 lost to D. Andrews 3&2	0–1–0 lost w/H. Alfredsson 3&2	1–0–0 won w/H. Alfredsson 1up	1	33.3%
1996	5	1–2–2	0–0–1 halved w/B. Daniel	0–1–1 lost w/H. Alfredsson 2&1, halved w/K. Marshall	1–1–0 lost w/C. Nilsmark 1dn, won w/C. Nilsmark 3&1	2	40.0%
1998	4	1–3–0	1–0–0 def B. Burton 1up	0–2–0 lost w/L. Hackney 1dn, lost w/C. Nilsmark 3&1	0–1–0 lost w/C. Sörenstam 2&1	1	25.0%
2000	3	0–1–2	0–0–1 halved w P. Hurst	0–1–0 lost w/H. Alfredsson 1dn	0–0–1 halved w/P. Meunier-Lebouc	1	33.3%

== See also ==
- List of golfers with most Ladies European Tour wins
- List of golfers with most LPGA Tour wins
