= 1998 Ladies European Tour =

Golf tournament series

1998 Ladies European Tour season
- Duration: N/A
- Number of official events: 11
- Order of Merit: (Sweden) Helen Alfredsson
- Player of the Year: (Sweden) Sophie Gustafson
- Rookie of the Year: (United States) Laura Philo
- Lowest stroke average: (England) Laura Davies

The 1998 Ladies European Tour was a series of golf tournaments for elite female golfers from around the world which took place in 1998. The tournaments were sanctioned by the Ladies European Tour (LET).

== Tournaments ==
The table below shows the 1998 schedule. The numbers in brackets after the winners' names show the number of career wins they had on the Ladies European Tour up to and including that event. This is only shown for members of the tour.

| Date | Tournament | Venue | Location | Winner | Score | Margin of victory | Runner(s)-up | Note |
|---|---|---|---|---|---|---|---|---|
| 6 Jun | **Evian Masters** | Evian Resort Golf Club | France | (Sweden) Helen Alfredsson (9) | 277 | 4 strokes | (Sweden) Maria Hjorth | |
| 18 Jul | Chrysler Ladies Austrian Open | Steiermarkischer GC Murhof | Austria | (New Zealand) Lynnette Brooky (1) | 203 | 1 stroke | (England) Trish Johnson | |
| 26 Jul | Chrysler Open | Sjögärde Golf Club | Sweden | (England) Laura Davies (27) | 284 | 6 strokes | (England) Trish Johnson, (Spain) Raquel Carriedo | |
| 2 Aug | Ladies German Open | Treudelberg GC, Hamburg | Germany | (England) Lora Fairclough (4) | 282 | 3 strokes | (England) Joanne Morley, (France) Stephanie Dallongeville | |
| 9 Aug | McDonald's WPGA Championship | Gleneagles | Scotland | (Scotland) Catriona Matthew (1) | 276 | 5 strokes | (Sweden) Helen Alfredsson, (England) Laura Davies | |
| 16 Aug | **Weetabix Women's British Open** | Royal Lytham & St Annes Golf Club | England | (United States) Sherri Steinhauer (n/a) | 292 | 1 stroke | (Sweden) Sophie Gustafson, (United States) Brandie Burton | Co-sanctioned by the LPGA Tour |
| 23 Aug | Compaq Open | Barsebäck Golf & Country Club | Sweden | (Sweden) Annika Sörenstam (5) | 279 | 10 strokes | (Sweden) Catrin Nilsmark, (England) Samantha Head | |
| 5 Sep | Donegal Irish Ladies Open | Ballyliffin GC, County Donegal | Ireland | (Sweden) Sophie Gustafson (2) | 214 | Playoff | (Denmark) Iben Tinning | |
| 17 Oct | Air France Madame Open | Deauville GC | France | (France) Patricia Meunier-Lebouc (3) | 208 | 1 stroke | (Sweden) Maria Hjorth | |
| 24 Oct | Marrakech Palmeraie Open | Palmeraie Golf Palace | Morocco | (Sweden) Sophie Gustafson (3) | 201 | 8 strokes | (France) Marie-Laure de Lorenzi | |
| 15 Nov | Praia d'El Rey European Cup | Óbidos | Portugal | European Senior Tour | 10–10 | | Ladies European Tour | Team event |

Major championships in bold.

== Order of Merit rankings ==
| Rank | Player | Money (£) |
|---|---|---|
| 1 | (Sweden) Helen Alfredsson | 125,975 |
| 2 | (Sweden) Sophie Gustafson | 103,443 |
| 3 | (Sweden) Maria Hjorth | 77,733 |
| 4 | (England) Trish Johnson | 73,190 |
| 5 | (England) Laura Davies | 70,918 |
| 6 | (Scotland) Catriona Matthew | 59,747 |
| 7 | (Sweden) Catrin Nilsmark | 52,544 |
| 8 | (England) Alison Nicholas | 47,412 |
| 9 | (England) Lora Fairclough | 37,575 |
| 10 | (France) Marie-Laure de Lorenzi | 36,021 |

== See also ==
- 1998 LPGA Tour
