= Hennessy Ladies Cup =

Tournament information
- Location: Cologne, Germany (1991–97); Paris, France (1985–90)
- Established: 1985
- Course: Golf und Land Club Köln
- Par: 72
- Tour: Ladies European Tour
- Format: Stroke play
- Final year: 1997

Final champion
- (England) Laura Davies

The Hennessy Ladies Cup was a women's professional golf tournament on the Ladies European Tour that took place in France and Germany.

== Winners ==
Year	Venue	Location	Winner	Score	Margin of victory	Runner(s)-up
Hennessy Cup
1997	Golf und Land Club Köln	Germany	(England) Laura Davies	288 (E)	1 stroke	(Australia) Anne-Marie Knight
1996	Golf und Land Club Köln	Germany	(Sweden) Helen Alfredsson	280 (−8)	Playoff	(Sweden) Liselotte Neumann (England) Trish Johnson
1995	Golf und Land Club Köln	Germany	(Sweden) Annika Sörenstam	271 (−17)	1 stroke	(Sweden) Liselotte Neumann (England) Trish Johnson
Hennessy Ladies Cup
1994	Golf und Land Club Köln	Germany	(Sweden) Liselotte Neumann	277 (−11)	1 stroke	(England) Alison Nicholas
1993	Golf und Land Club Köln	Germany	(Sweden) Liselotte Neumann	280 (−8)	Playoff	(England) Laura Davies
1992	Golf und Land Club Köln	Germany	(Sweden) Helen Alfredsson	271 (−17)	1 stroke	(England) Trish Johnson
1991	Golf und Land Club Köln	Germany	(Sweden) Helen Alfredsson	280 (−8)	Playoff	(Australia) Corinne Dibnah (France) Marie-Laure de Lorenzi
1990	Golf de Saint Germain	France	(England) Trish Johnson	285 (−3)	3 strokes	(United States) Tammie Green (France) Marie-Laure de Lorenzi
1989	Golf de Saint Germain	France	(France) Marie-Laure de Lorenzi	279 (−9)	2 strokes	(Australia) Corinne Dibnah (United States) Jody Rosenthal
1988	Golf de Saint Germain	France	(France) Marie-Laure de Lorenzi	284 (−4)	1 stroke	(United States) Marjorie Jones (England) Alison Nicholas
Hennessy Cognac Ladies Cup
1987	Golf de Saint Germain	France	(England) Kitrina Douglas	283 (−5)	3 strokes	(Italy) Federica Dassù (United States) Nancy Lopez
1986	Golf de Chantilly	France	(United States) Kelly Leadbetter	293 (+5)	1 stroke	(Australia) Karen Lunn
1985	Golf de Saint-Cloud	France	(Australia) Jan Stephenson	283 (−13)	5 strokes	(England) Laura Davies
