= Marie-Laure de Lorenzi =

French golfer (born 1961)

Personal information
- Nationality: France
- Born: 21 January 1961 (age 65) Biarritz, France
- Height: 1.75 m (5 ft 9 in)

Career
- Sport: Golf
- Turned professional: 1986
- Former tour: Ladies European Tour (1987–2004)
- Professional wins: 21

Number of wins by tour
- Ladies European Tour: 19 (3rd all-time)

Best results in LPGA major championships
- Chevron Championship: T48: 1989
- Women's PGA C'ship: DNP
- U.S. Women's Open: T11: 1989
- du Maurier Classic: DNP
- Women's British Open: DNP

Achievements and awards
- Ladies European Tour Order of Merit: 1988, 1989
- Vivian Saunders Trophy LET Stroke Average Award: 1996, 1997

Marie-Laure de Lorenzi (born 21 January 1961, in Biarritz) is a French professional golfer. She is known by her married name Marie-Laure Taya. She won 19 tournaments in a span of eleven seasons on the Ladies European Tour, putting her third, later tied third, on the all-time list of number of wins on the tour.

== Early life and amateur career ==
In 1961, De Lorenzi was born. She played for her country in the European Lady Junior's Team Championship, for players up to the age of 21, from she was 14 years old in 1975 until 1982 and was on the winning team in 1979. She won individually in 1981.

She also represented her country four times at the European Ladies' Team Championship and four times at the Espirito Santo Trophy.

== Professional career ==
In 1987, De Lorenzi joined the Ladies European Tour. She won the Order of Merit in 1988 and 1989. In those two years, when she led the rankings, she finished first or second 17 times, when the tour schedules included 46 individual tournaments over the two seasons. That means that she finished first or second in 37% of all scheduled tournaments over two full seasons on the tour.

She finished third, after tying the lead after the third round, at the 1989 Women's British Open Championship, before it was permanently co-sanctioned by the LPGA Tour in 1994 and regarded as a major championship by the LPGA in 2001. The same year, de Lorenzi finished tied 11h at the 1989 U.S. Women's Open at Indianwood G&CC north of Detroit, Michigan, which came to be her best finish in a major championship.

She became a life time member of the Ladies European Tour, having accumulated 19 tournament victories on it.

As of 2024, she was tied third with Trish Johnson, after Laura Davies and Dale Reid, on the all-time list of number of wins on the Ladies European Tour.

During her career, de Lorenzi became, and as of 2024 still was, record holder of most wins in a single season, with seven wins in 1988. She also became the record holder of most consecutive wins back-to-back, with 3 wins in three consecutive scheduled tournaments in 1989, when she lost in a playoff in the fourth tournament.

She played for Europe in the first Solheim Cup, which took place in 1990, and was also a member of the European team in 1996 and 1998. She was invited by captain Micky Walker, to be reserve on site for the European team at the 1994 Solheim Cup in late October at The Greenbrier, West Virginia, United States, but decided to decline, due to lost confidence. However, de Lorenzi won the Spanish Open three weeks ahead of the team match.

De Lorenzi announced her retirement from tournament golf in 2004. In 2007, she was assistant captain of the European Solheim Cup team.

== Personal life ==
She competed using her married name Marie-Laure Taya from 1986 until midway through 1989 when she changed to Marie-Laure de Lorenzi-Taya. After her divorce from former Spanish amateur champion Roman Taya, she reverted to her maiden name in 1990.

She has represented Paris International Golf Club, but lived in Barcelona, Spain with her daughter Laura and enjoyed tennis, jazz, antiques and swimming.

== Awards and honors ==
- In 1988 and 1989, she won the Order of Merit on the Ladies European Tour (LET).
- In 1996 and 1997, she won the Vivian Saunders Trophy, bestowed to the player with the lowest scoring average on the LET.

== Amateur wins ==
- 1976 French International Lady Juniors Amateur Championship
- 1978 Spanish International Ladies Amateur Championship, French International Lady Juniors Amateur Championship
- 1980 Spanish International Ladies Amateur Championship
- 1983 Spanish International Ladies Amateur Championship, French Ladies Close Amateur Championship

== Professional wins (21) ==
=== Ladies European Tour wins (19) ===
No.	Date	Tournament	Winning score	Margin of victory	Runner(s)-up
1	14 Jun 1987	Belgian Ladies Godiva Open	−7 (72-71-70-72=285)	2 strokes	(England) Trish Johnson (United States) Susan Moon
2	9 Aug 1987	BMW Ladies' German Open	−13 (70-70-65-70=275)	5 strokes	(Scotland) Dale Reid
3	12 Jun 1988	Letting French Open	−2 (71-72-75-72=290)	Playoff	(France) Caroline Bourtayre (amateur)
4	19 Jun 1988	Volmac Dutch Open	+7 (75-74-72-74=295)	1 stroke	(England) Kitrina Douglas
5	10 Jul 1988	Hennessy Ladies Cup	−4 (75-72-66-71=284)	1 stroke	(England) Alison Nicholas
6	21 Aug 1988	Gothenburg Ladies Open	−9 (70-70-69-66=275)	3 strokes	(United States) Peggy Conley
7	9 Oct 1988	Laing Charity Classic	−16 (67-67-69=203)	7 strokes	(England) Caroline Griffiths
8	30 Oct 1988	Woolmark Ladies' Matchplay	4 and 2		(England) Alison Nicholas
9	3 Nov 1988	Qualitair Spanish Open	−12 (207)	4 strokes	(France) Corinne Soules
10	30 Apr 1989	Ford Ladies' Classic	−10 (286)	8 stroke	(Scotland) Gillian Stewart
11	28 May 1989	Hennessy Ladies Cup	−9 (279)	2 strokes	(Australia) Corinne Dibnah (United States) Jody Rosenthal
12	11 Jun 1989	BMW Ladies Classic	−11 (277)	1 stroke	(Australia) Dennise Hutton
13	29 Apr 1990	Ford Ladies' Classic	−12 (74-72-68-70=284)	3 strokes	(South Africa) Laurette Maritz
14	24 Oct 1993	VAR Open de France Feminin	+4 (72-79-69=220)	1 stroke	(Italy) Federica Dassù (Denmark) Karina Orum
15	2 Oct 1994	La Manga Spanish Open	−6 (71-72-68-71=282)	Playoff	(Sweden) Sofia Grönberg-Whitmore
16	13 May 1995	Costa Azul Ladies Open	−11 (72-67-66=205)	2 strokes	(Switzerland) Evelyn Orley
17	17 Sep 1995	Staatsloterij Ladies Open	−18 (67-66-68=201)	9 strokes	(England) Lora Fairclough
18	15 Oct 1995	Nestlé French Ladies Open	−9 (71-68-71=210)	10 strokes	(Scotland) Kathryn Marshall (England) Alison Nicholas (England) Sally Prosser
19	15 Jun 1997	Déesse Ladies' Swiss Open	−8 (72-68-70-70=280)	Playoff	(England) Trish Johnson

Ladies European Tour playoff record (3–4)

No.	Year	Tournament	Opponent(s)	Result
1	1988	Letting French Open	(France) Caroline Bourtayre (amateur)	Won on fourth extra hole.
2	1989	Open de France Dames	(England) Suzanne Strudwick	Lost to birdie at first extra hole.
3	1989	Danish Ladies Open	(Spain) Tania Abitbol	Lost to par at third extra hole.
4	1989	Godiva Ladies European Masters	(England) Kitrina Douglas	Lost to par at second extra hole.
5	1991	Hennessy Ladies Cup	(Sweden) Helen Alfredsson (Australia) Corinne Dibnah	Lost. Eliminated to par on first extra hole. Alfredsson won with birdie on third extra hole.
6	1994	La Manga Spanish Open	(Sweden) Sofia Grönberg-Whitmore	Won on second extra hole.
7	1997	Déesse Ladies' Swiss Open	(England) Trish Johnson	Won with birdie at first extra hole

=== Other wins (2) ===
No.	Date	Tournament	Winning score	Margin of victory	Runner(s)-up
1	1988	Benson & Hedges Trophy^ (team with (Zimbabwe) Mark McNulty)	−12 (276)	1 stroke	(Spain) José María Cañizares and (Spain) Tania Abitbol
2	1993	Lalla Meryem Cup			

^ Mixed pairs unofficial money event on the European Tour and Ladies European Tour.

== Team appearances ==
Amateur

- European Lady Junior's Team Championship (representing France): 1975, 1978, 1979 (winners), 1980, 1981, 1982
- European Ladies' Team Championship (representing France): 1979, 1981, 1983, 1985
- Vagliano Trophy (representing Continent of Europe): 1979, 1985
- Espirito Santo Trophy (representing France): 1978, 1980, 1982, 1986

Professional

- Solheim Cup (representing Europe): 1990, 1996, 1998
- Sunrise Cup World Team Championship (representing France): 1992
- Praia D'el Rey European Cup (representing Ladies European Tour): 1999 (winners)

== See also ==
- List of golfers with most Ladies European Tour wins
