= Chart Hills Golf Club =

Golf club in Kent, England

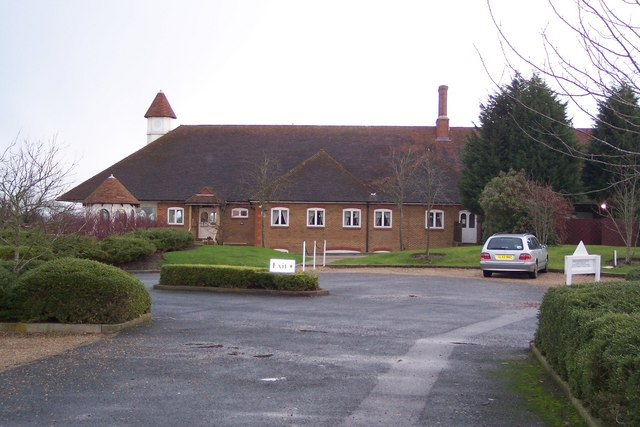
- Clubhouse in 2009

- Location in England Location in the United Kingdom
- 51.1338°N 0.6487°E

Club information
- Location: Weeks Lane; Biddenden, Kent, England
- Established: 1993; 33 years ago
- Type: Private
- Owner: Raymac Group
- Total holes: 18
- Website: charthills.co.uk
- Designed by: Sir Nick Faldo, Steve Smyers
- Par: 72
- Length: 7,132 yards (6,522 m)

Chart Hills Golf Club is a championship golf club in England, located in Biddenden, Kent.

== History ==
The golf course at Chart Hills was designed by English golf great Sir Nick Faldo and Steve Smyers. They created a big and attractive golf course, with acres of water and sand designed to challenge the very best of golfers. Smyers said: "You feel a great course, it thrills you and sometimes frightens you. But in the end, it will challenge the best in you." Opened 33 years ago in 1993, while Faldo was still an active player, it was his first design in Europe.

Chart Hills has regularly played host to a number of high-profile golf events. It is a European Tour Qualifying School venue and has hosted Ladies European Tour (LET) events, the Ladies English Open (2004–07) and Ford Golf Classic (1995). In between in 2000, the club hosted the Kronenbourg 1664 Chart Hills Classic, a 54-hole LET event in late summer; Gina Marie Scott of New Zealand won in a playoff, over Isabella Maconi of Italy.

=== Ownership ===
Chart Hills was purchased by Paul Gibbons in 1999 through his Leaderboard company, which also owned several other golf venues.

In 2016, rapidly expanding hotel group, Kings Resorts completed the take over of Chart Hills for an undisclosed fee.

In 2019, Chart Hills was bought by Raymac Group; after undertaking substantial renovations led by golf architect Steve Smyers and Nick Faldo, it reopened in 2021.
