= Open de France Dames =

Women's professional golf tournament

Lacoste Ladies Open de France

Tournament information
- Location: Evian-les-Bains, France
- Established: 1987; 39 years ago
- Course: Evian Resort Golf Club
- Par: 72
- Tour: Ladies European Tour
- Format: Stroke play - 54 holes
- Prize fund: €450,000
- Month played: May

Current champion
- (Germany) Helen Briem

Final champion
- Location in France Location in Auvergne-Rhône-Alpes

The Open de France Dames is a women's professional national open golf tournament in France on the Ladies European Tour. It has been played annually since 1987, with four exceptions: 1990, 1991, 1992, and 1998.

In 2011, Lacoste became the title sponsor of the event. Between 2012 and 2017 the tournament was held at Golf de Chantaco, near Saint-Jean-de-Luz in the Basque Country, which belongs to the Lacoste family. As Chantaco underwent construction works after the 2017 event, the tournament was moved to the Golf du Médoc Resort and later to Golf Barrière Deauville in Normandy.

In 2026, Jabra became new title sponsor and the tournament moved to Evian Resort Golf Club, succeeding the Jabra Ladies Open at the venue, and moving from September to May in the process.

== Winners ==
Year	Venue	Winner	Score	Margin of victory	Runner(s)-up
Jabra Ladies Open de France
2026	Evian Resort Golf Club	(Germany) Helen Briem	201 (−12)	7 strokes	(Republic of Ireland) Sara Byrne (Wales) Lydia Hall (Singapore) Shannon Tan
Lacoste Ladies Open de France
2025	Golf Barrière Deauville	(Canada) Anna Huang	197 (−16)	2 strokes	(South Africa) Casandra Alexander (Germany) Helen Briem
2024	Golf Barrière Deauville	(Switzerland) Chiara Tamburlini	206 (−7)	Playoff	(Australia) Kirsten Rudgeley
2023	Golf Barrière Deauville	(Sweden) Johanna Gustavsson	197 (−16)	3 strokes	(Sweden) Moa Folke
2022	Golf Barrière Deauville	(Morocco) Ines Laklalech	199 (−14)	Playoff	(England) Meghan MacLaren
2021	Golf du Médoc Resort	(France) Céline Boutier	202 (−11)	1 stroke	(Scotland) Kylie Henry
2020	Golf du Médoc Resort	(Sweden) Julia Engström	206 (−7)	1 stroke	(Argentina) Magdalena Simmermacher (France) Céline Herbin
2019	Golf du Médoc Resort	(United States) Nelly Korda	269 (−15)	8 strokes	(France) Céline Boutier
2018	Golf du Médoc Resort	(Sweden) Caroline Hedwall	272 (−12)	2 strokes	(South Africa) Stacy Lee Bregman
2017	Golf de Chantaco	(United States) Cristie Kerr	263 (−17)	4 strokes	(China) Xiyu Lin
2016	Golf de Chantaco	(United States) Beth Allen	266 (−14)	4 strokes	(England) Florentyna Parker (Italy) Diana Luna
2015	Golf de Chantaco	(France) Céline Herbin	269 (−11)	Playoff	(Denmark) Emily Kristine Pedersen
2014	Golf de Chantaco	(Spain) Azahara Muñoz (2)	269 (−11)	1 stroke	(Wales) Amy Boulden (Spain) María Hernández
2013	Golf de Chantaco	(Spain) Azahara Muñoz	266 (−14)	1 stroke	(France) Valentine Derrey (France) Gwladys Nocera
2012	Golf de Chantaco	(Australia) Stacey Keating	266 (−14)	1 stroke	(Italy) Diana Luna
2011	Paris International Golf Club	(England) Felicity Johnson	274 (−14)	Playoff	(Italy) Diana Luna
Open de France féminin
2010	Paris International Golf Club	(England) Trish Johnson (3)	274 (−14)	Playoff	(Italy) Diana Luna
Randstad Open de France
2009	Golf d'Arras	(Austria) Nicole Gergely	275 (−13)	2 strokes	(Finland) Ursula Wikström
Vediorbis Open de France Dames
2008	Golf d'Arras	(Germany) Anja Monke	278 (−10)	2 strokes	(Spain) Tania Elósegui (Sweden) Nina Reis
2007	Golf d'Arras	(Sweden) Linda Wessberg	277 (−11)	1 stroke	(England) Trish Johnson
2006	Golf d'Arras	(Italy) Veronica Zorzi (2)	281 (−7)	1 stroke	(England) Laura Davies
2005	Golf d'Arras	(Italy) Veronica Zorzi	276 (−12)	1 stroke	(England) Trish Johnson
Open de France Dames
2004	Golf d'Arras	(France) Stéphanie Arricau	281 (−7)	2 strokes	(Austria) Natascha Fink
Open de France Dames Crédit Mutuel Nord
2003	Golf d'Arras	(New Zealand) Lynnette Brooky (2)	274 (−14)	1 stroke	(England) Trish Johnson (Norway) Vibeke Stensrud
2002	Golf d'Arras	(New Zealand) Lynnette Brooky	272 (−16)	5 strokes	(Spain) Paula Martí
Open de France Dames
2001	Golf d'Arras	(Norway) Suzann Pettersen	280 (−8)	Playoff	(Wales) Becky Morgan
2000	Golf d'Arras	(France) Patricia Meunier-Lebouc	271 (−17)	1 stroke	(Spain) Raquel Carriedo-Tomás (Sweden) Åsa Gottmo
1999	Paris International Golf Club	(England) Trish Johnson (2)	282 (−6)	2 strokes	(England) Alison Nicholas
1998	No tournament				
1997	Paris International Golf Club	(Australia) Karen Lunn	281 (−7)	4 strokes	(South Africa) Laurette Maritz
1996	Golf d'Arras	(England) Trish Johnson	200 (−19)	10 strokes	(Spain) Raquel Carriedo-Tomás
Nestlé French Ladies Open
1995	Golf de Saint-Endréol	(France) Marie-Laure de Lorenzi (3)	210 (−9)	10 strokes	(England) Sally Prosser (England) Alison Nicholas (Scotland) Kathryn Marshall
VAR Open de France Dames
1994	Golf de Saint-Endréol	(Scotland) Julie Forbes	213 (−3)	Playoff	(Scotland) Dale Reid (England) Suzanne Strudwick
1993	Golf de Sainte-Maxime	(France) Marie-Laure de Lorenzi (2)	220 (+1)	1 stroke	(Italy) Federica Dassù (Denmark) Karina Ørum
1990–92	No tournament				
Open de France Dames
1989	Golf & Country Club de Fourqueux	(England) Suzanne Strudwick	285 (−3)	Playoff	(France) Marie-Laure de Lorenzi
Letting French Open
1988	Golf & Country Club de Fourqueux	(France) Marie-Laure Taya	290 (−2)	Playoff	(France) Caroline Bourtayre
1987	Golf & Country Club de Fourqueux	(Sweden) Liselotte Neumann	293 (−7)	5 strokes	(England) Laura Davies
