= 2003 Kraft Nabisco Championship =

Coordinates: 33.798°N 116.433°W

Tournament information
- Dates: March 27–30, 2003
- Location: Rancho Mirage, California
- Courses: Mission Hills Country Club; Dinah Shore Tourn. Course
- Tour: LPGA Tour
- Format: Stroke play - 72 holes

Statistics
- Par: 72
- Length: 6,520 yards (5,962 m)
- Field: 100 players, 79 after cut
- Cut: 154 (+10)
- Prize fund: $1.6 million
- Winner's share: $240,000

Champion
- (France) Patricia Meunier-Lebouc
- 281 (−7)

Location in the United States
Location in California

The 2003 Kraft Nabisco Championship was a women's professional golf tournament, held March 27–30 at Mission Hills Country Club in Rancho Mirage, California. This was the 32nd edition of the Kraft Nabisco Championship, and the 21st edition as a major championship.

Patricia Meunier-Lebouc won her only major title, one stroke ahead of runner-up Annika Sörenstam, the two-time defending champion. Meunier-Lebouc was the leader by three strokes after 54 holes, but hit a tee shot out of bounds early in the final round, but regained the lead after a birdie at the 13th hole. Ahead by two strokes on the final hole, she played conservatively and three-putted for a bogey and the win.

The low amateur was 13-year-old Michelle Wie at even par, seven strokes back in a tie for ninth. After a 66 on Saturday to climb up to third place, she dropped back with a 76 on Sunday.

At this time, Sörenstam had won four of her ten major titles. In late May, she became the first woman to play in a PGA Tour event in 58 years. It was at the Colonial in Fort Worth, Texas, and she missed the cut by four strokes.

== Final leaderboard ==
Sunday, March 30, 2003

Place	Player	Score	To par	Money ($)
1	(France) Patricia Meunier-Lebouc	70-68-70-73=281	−7	240,000
2	(Sweden) Annika Sörenstam	68-72-71-71=282	−6	146,120
3	(Mexico) Lorena Ochoa	71-70-74-68=283	−5	106,000
4	(England) Laura Davies	70-75-69-70=284	−4	82,000
T5	(United States) Beth Daniel	75-74-68-70=287	−1	51,200
T5	(United States) Laura Diaz	76-71-69-71=287	−1	51,200
T5	(Sweden) Maria Hjorth	72-72-73-70=287	−1	51,200
T5	(Scotland) Catriona Matthew	71-74-72-70=287	−1	51,200
T9	(Philippines) Jennifer Rosales	74-70-72-72=288	E	35,600
T9	(United States) Michelle Wie (a)	72-74-66-76=288	E	0

Amateurs: Michelle Wie (E), Virada Nirapathpongporn (+5), Lindsey Wright (+13).
