= List of golfers with most Ladies European Tour wins =

This table lists players with 11 or more wins on the Ladies European Tour. It does not include official wins on other professional tours, of which a few of the golfers listed, such as Laura Davies and Annika Sörenstam, have many.

Members of the World Golf Hall of Fame are annotated HoF.

The list is complete through the 2025 season.

Rank	Name	Lifespan	Country	Wins	Winning span
1	Laura Davies HoF	1963–	England	45	1985–2010
2	Dale Reid	1959–2023	Scotland	21	1980–1991
T3	Marie-Laure de Lorenzi	1961–	France	19	1987–1997
T3	Trish Johnson	1966–	England	19	1987–2014
5	Annika Sörenstam HoF	1970–	Sweden	17	1995–2008
6	Sophie Gustafson	1973–	Sweden	16	1996–2011
T7	Gwladys Nocera	1975–	France	14	2006–2015
T7	Catherine Panton-Lewis	1955–	Scotland	14	1979–1988
9	Corinne Dibnah	1962–	Australia	13	1986–1994
10	Alison Nicholas	1962–	England	12	1987–1996
T11	Liselotte Neumann	1966–	Sweden	11	1985–1995
T11	Helen Alfredsson	1965–	Sweden	11	1990–2008
T11	Lee-Anne Pace	1981–	South Africa	11	2010–2022

"T" indicates tied for ranking position
