= Valérie Michaud =

French professional golfer

Personal information
- Nationality: France
- Born: 12 January 1970 (age 56)

Career
- Sport: Golf
- Turned professional: 1992
- Former tour: Ladies European Tour
- Professional wins: 1

Number of wins by tour
- Ladies European Tour: 1
Medal record
Mediterranean Games
Gold medal – first place	1991 Athens	Women's team

Valérie Michaud (born 12 January 1970) is a retired French professional golfer who played on the Ladies European Tour. She won the 1991 British Ladies Amateur and the 1992 Dutch Ladies Open.

== Career ==
Michaud played for the French national side from 1986 to 1992, including at the 1991 Vagliano Trophy at Nairn Golf Club in Nairn, Scotland. She won the Team gold at the 1991 Mediterranean Games together with Anne Lanzerac and Caroline Boutayre.

Michaud was runner-up at the 1988 Spanish International Ladies Amateur Championship. In 1991 Michaud won the 88th Ladies' British Open Amateur Championship held at Pannal Golf Club in Pannal near Harrogate, North Yorkshire. She beat Wendy Doolan from Australia 3 and 2 in the final.

Michaud turned professional and competed on the Ladies European Tour between 1992 and 2005. She recorded one LET win at the 1992 Dutch Ladies Open, where she outscored Laura Davies by one stroke.

== Amateur wins ==
- 1988 French Junior Ladies Amateur
- 1989 Luxembourg Ladies Amateur
- 1991 British Ladies Amateur, French Ladies Amateur, Italian Ladies Amateur

== Professional wins (1) ==
=== Ladies European Tour wins (1) ===
No.	Date	Tournament	Winning score	Margin of victory	Runner-up
1	23 Aug 1992	Holiday Inn Leiden Ladies' Open	−12 (204)	1 stroke	(England) Laura Davies

== Team appearances ==
Amateur

- European Ladies' Team Championship (representing France): 1991
- Vagliano Trophy (representing Continent of Europe): 1991
- Mediterranean Games (representing France):1991
