= Slovenian Ladies Open =

Tournament information
- Location: Lesce, Slovenia
- Established: 1992
- Course: Royal Bled GC
- Par: 73
- Tour: Ladies European Tour
- Format: 54-hole Stroke play
- Month played: October
- Final year: 1992

Final champion
- (Australia) Karen Lunn

The Slovenian Ladies Open was a women's professional golf tournament on the Ladies European Tour that took place in Slovenia.

== Winners ==
Year	Dates	Winner	Country	Score	To par	Margin of victory	Runners-up	Note
1992	9–11 Oct	Karen Lunn	Australia	141^{^}	−5	4 strokes	(Australia) Helen Hopkins (England) Allison Shapcott	

^{^}Shortened from 54-holes

== See also ==
- BTC Slovenian Open – men's Challenge Tour event played at the same venue
