= Ladies German Open =

Professional golf tournament

Tournament information
- Location: Wörthsee, Bavaria, Germany
- Established: 1984
- Course: Wörthsee Golf Club
- Par: 72
- Tour: Ladies European Tour
- Format: Stroke play
- Prize fund: €250,000
- Month played: July

Tournament record score
- Aggregate: 263 Kylie Walker
- To par: −25 as above

Final champion
- (Scotland) Kylie Walker
- Location in Germany

The Ladies German Open was a professional golf tournament on the Ladies European Tour schedule. It was held annually from 1984 to 2014 except for two interruptions, 1992 to 1994 and 2002 to 2007.

== Winners ==
Year	Venue	Winner	Country	Score	Margin of victory	Runner(s)-up	Country
Ladies German Open presented by Marriott
2014	Wörthsee	Kylie Walker	Scotland	263 (−25)	Playoff	Charley Hull	England
Unicredit Ladies German Open presented by Audi
2013	Gut Häusern	Carlota Ciganda	Spain	101 (−6)	Playoff	Charley Hull	England
2012	Gut Häusern	Anne-Lise Caudal	France	275 (−13)	Playoff	Laura Davies	England
2011	Gut Häusern	Diana Luna	Italy	264 (−24)	7 strokes	Minea Blomqvist	Finland
2010	Gut Häusern	Laura Davies	England	277 (−11)	2 strokes	Melissa Reid	England
HypoVereinsbank Ladies German Open
2009	Gut Häusern	Jade Schaeffer	France	275 (−13)	Playoff	Paula Martí	Spain
2008	Gut Häusern	Amy Yang	South Korea	267 (−21)	4 strokes	Louise Stahle	Sweden
2002–07: No tournament
Palmerston Ladies' German Open
2001	Bad Saarow	Karine Icher	France	210 (−6)	1 stroke	Suzann Pettersen	Norway
stilwerk Ladies' German Open
2000	Treudelberg	Joanne Morley	England	274 (−14)	2 strokes	Raquel Carriedo	Spain
1999	Treudelberg	Anne-Marie Knight	Australia	278 (−10)	1 stroke	Sophie Gustafson	Sweden
1999	Treudelberg	Anne-Marie Knight	Australia	278 (−10)	1 stroke	Laura Davies	England
Ladies' German Open
1998	Treudelberg	Lora Fairclough	England	282 (−10)	3 strokes	Stephanie Dallongeville	France
1998	Treudelberg	Lora Fairclough	England	282 (−10)	3 strokes	Joanne Morley	England
1997	Treudelberg	Joanne Mills	Australia	283 (−9)	Playoff	Lynnette Brooky	New Zealand
1996	Treudelberg	Joanne Morley	England	281 (−11)	4 strokes	Maria Hjorth	Sweden
Maredo German Open
1995	Treudelberg	Rachel Hetherington	Australia	275 (−17)	2 strokes	Caroline Hall	England
1992–94: No tournament
Lufthansa Ladies' German Open
1991	Wörthsee	Florence Descampe	Belgium	272 (−16)	3 strokes	Liselotte Neumann	Sweden
1990	Wörthsee	Ayako Okamoto	Japan	274 (−14)	Playoff	Cindy Rarick	United States
1990	Wörthsee	Ayako Okamoto	Japan	274 (−14)	Playoff	Laurette Maritz	South Africa
1989	Wörthsee	Alison Nicholas	England	269 (−19)	5 strokes	Patricia Gonzalez	Colombia
BMW Ladies' German Open
1988	Hubbelrath	Liselotte Neumann	Sweden	290 (+2)	1 stroke	Marie-Laure Taya	France
1987	Wendlohe	Marie-Laure Taya	France	275 (−13)	5 strokes	Dale Reid	Scotland
1986	Olching	Liselotte Neumann	Sweden	282 (−6)	2 strokes	Alison Nicholas	England
LBS Ladies' German Open
1985	Braunfels	Julie Brown	Scotland	288 (−4)	Playoff	Barbara Helbig	Germany
1984	Braunfels	Beverly Huke	England	219 (Par)	3 strokes	Kitrina Douglas	England

== Tournament highlights ==
- 2011: Diana Luna wins with a bogey-free four rounds, a rare occurrence.
