= Belgian Ladies Open =

Tournament information
- Location: Brussels, Belgium
- Established: 1985
- Course: Hulencourt Golf Club
- Tour: Ladies European Tour
- Format: 54-hole Stroke play
- Month played: June

Tournament record score
- Aggregate: 275 Penny Grice-Whittaker
- To par: −17 as above

Current champion
- (Spain) Carolina López-Chacarra

Final champion
- Location in Europe Location in Belgium

The Belgian Ladies Open is a women's professional golf tournament on the Ladies European Tour held in Belgium.

== History ==
The tournament was played annually 1985–1995. It was known as the Godiva Ladies European Masters 1988–1989 and the BMW European Masters 1990–1994. The tournament was slated to return to the LET schedule in 2020 but was postponed to 2022 due to the COVID-19 pandemic. After a one year hiatus the tournament returned in 2025, now held at Hulencourt Golf Club near Brussels.

Between 2014 and 2022 Belgium also hosted the Belgian LETAS Trophy on the LET's development tour.

== Winners ==
Year	Winner	Country	Score	Margin of victory	Runner(s)-up	Venue
Hulencourt Women's Open
2026	Carolina López-Chacarra	Spain	276 (−12)	3 strokes	(Australia) Kelsey Bennett	Hulencourt Golf Club
2025	Darcey Harry	Wales	275 (−13)	3 strokes	(France) Nastasia Nadaud	Hulencourt Golf Club
2024: No tournament
Belgian Ladies Open
2023	Patricia Isabel Schmidt	Germany	205 (−11)	2 strokes	(Spain) María Hernández (Germany) Chiara Noja	Naxhelet Golf Club
Mithra Belgian Ladies Open
2022	Linn Grant	Sweden	201 (−15)	1 stroke	(England) Cara Gainer	Naxhelet Golf Club
2021	No tournament due to the COVID-19 pandemic					Naxhelet Golf Club
2020	No tournament due to the COVID-19 pandemic					Naxhelet Golf Club
1996–2019: No tournament
Ladies European Masters
1995	Lora Fairclough	England	206 (−10)	2 strokes	(Italy) Federica Dassù	Cleydael Golf & Country Club
BMW European Masters
1994	Helen Wadsworth	Wales	278 (−14)	3 strokes	(United States) Tracy Hanson	Royal Bercuit Golf Club
1993	Helen Dobson	England	283 (−9)	1 stroke	(France) Marie-Laure de Lorenzi (Scotland) Dale Reid	Royal Bercuit Golf Club
1992	Kitrina Douglas (2)	England	279 (−13)	1 stroke	(England) Trish Johnson	Royal Bercuit Golf Club
1991	Corinne Dibnah	Australia	284 (−8)	3 strokes	(Belgium) Florence Descampe (Sweden) Catrin Nilsmark	Royal Bercuit Golf Club
1990	Karen Lunn	Australia	285 (−3)	4 strokes	(France) Corinne Soulès	Royal Bercuit Golf Club
Godiva Ladies European Masters
1989	Kitrina Douglas	England	287 (−5)	Playoff	(France) Marie-Laure de Lorenzi	Royal Bercuit Golf Club
1988	Karen Lunn	Australia	276 (−16)	2 strokes	(France) Marie-Laure de Lorenzi	Royal Antwerp Golf Club
Belgian Ladies Open
1987	Marie-Laure de Lorenzi	France	285 (−7)	2 strokes	(England) Trish Johnson (United States) Susan Moon	Royal Waterloo GC (Marache)
1986	Penny Grice-Whittaker	England	275 (−17)	9 strokes	(Scotland) Gillian Stewart	Royal Waterloo GC (Marache)
1985	Laura Davies	England	286 (−6)	1 stroke	(England) Maxine Burton	Royal Waterloo GC (Marache)

== See also ==
- Belgian Open
