= Belgian LETAS Trophy =

Women's professional golf tournament

Tournament information
- Location: Beringen, Belgium
- Established: 2014
- Course: Millennium Golf
- Par: 72
- Tour: LET Access Series
- Format: 54-hole Stroke play
- Prize fund: €40,000
- Month played: June

Tournament record score
- Aggregate: 203 Lily May Humphreys (2021)
- To par: –12 Anne Van Dam (2016)

Current champion
- (Australia) Kristalle Blum

The Belgian LETAS Trophy is a women's professional golf tournament played as part of the LET Access Series, held in the Belgium.

== Winners ==
Year	Venue	Winner	Country	Score	Margin of victory	Runner(s)-up	Ref
Golf Vlaanderen LETAS Trophy
2022	Millennium Golf	Kristalle Blum	Australia	−5 (69-67-75=211)	1 stroke	(Belgium) Sophie Bert (a) (France) Yvie Chaucheprat (New Zealand) Momoka Kobori (Germany) Chiara Noja	
Golf Flanders LETAS Trophy
2021	Rinkven International	Lily May Humphreys	England	−10 (70-67-66=203)	6 strokes	(Germany) Chiara Noja (a) (Russia) Nina Pegova	
Belfius Ladies Open
2020	No tournament due to the COVID-19 pandemic						
2019	Cleydael	Emma Grechi	France	−7 (71-69-69=209)	3 strokes	(Morocco) Ines Laklalech (a) (Spain) Laura Gomez Ruiz (Scotland) Jane Turner	
2018	Royal Bercuit	Emma Nilsson	Sweden	−5 (71-69-71=211)	3 strokes	(France) Julie Aime (France) Manon Molle	
2017	Rinkven International	Heather MacRae	Scotland	−6 (69-72-66=207)	Playoff	(England) Meghan MacLaren	
CitizenGuard LETAS Trophy
2016	Royal Waterloo	Anne Van Dam	Netherlands	−12 (70-70-67=207)	3 strokes	(France) Justine Dreher (Denmark) Daisy Nielsen	
2015	Rinkven International	Natalia Escuriola (a)	Spain	−11 (68-69-68=205)	2 strokes	(Germany) Olivia Cowan	
Royal Belgian Golf Federation LETAS Trophy
2014	Rinkven International	Isabella Ramsay	Sweden	−7 (67-71-71=209)	3 strokes	(Spain) Marta Sanz Barrio (a)	

== See also ==
- Belgian Ladies Open
