= Liz Weima =

Dutch professional golfer

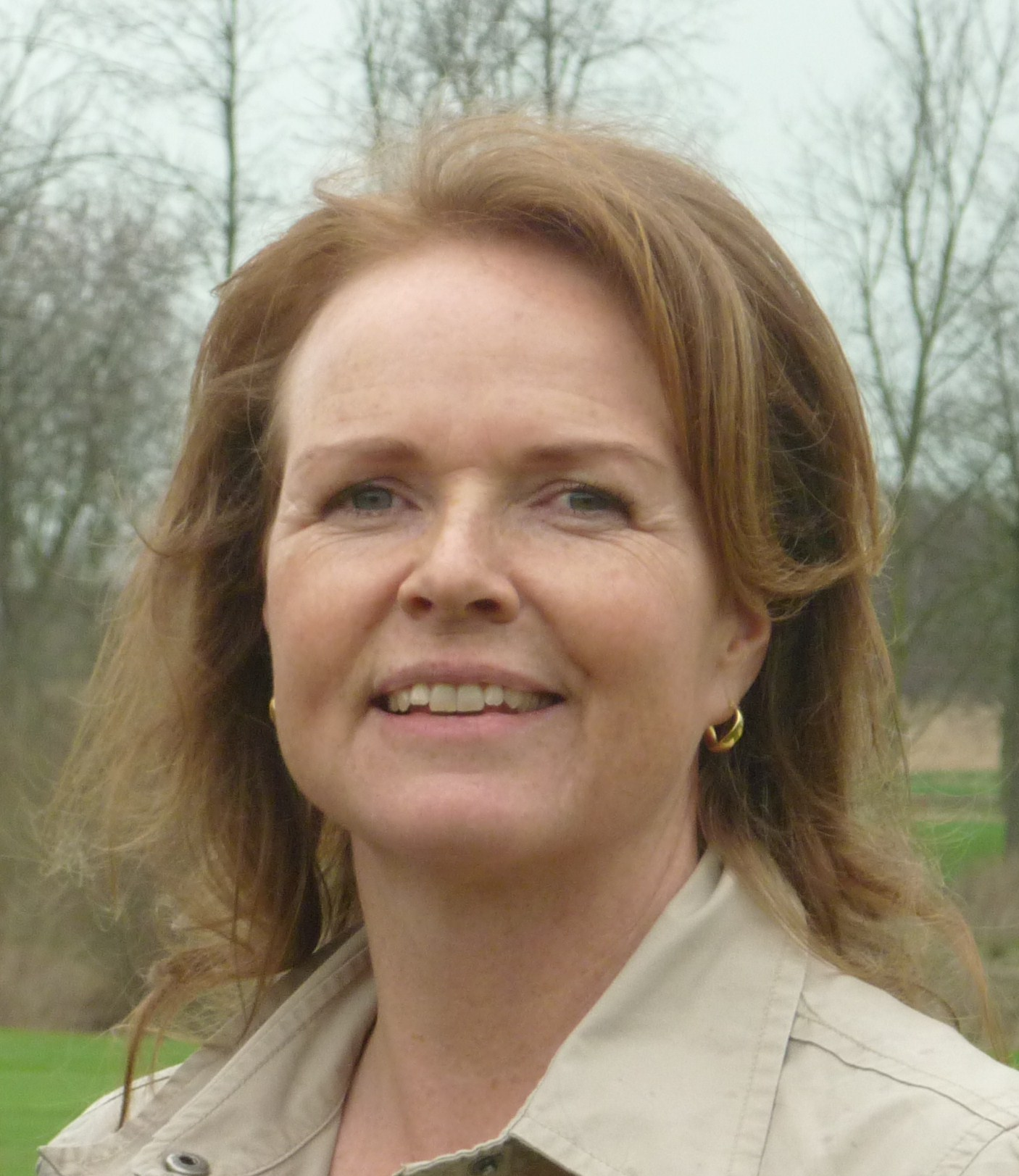

Personal information
- Nationality: Netherlands
- Born: 19 September 1968 (age 58) Barendrecht, Netherlands
- Children: 2

Career
- Sport: Golf
- Turned professional: 1992
- Former tour: Ladies European Tour
- Professional wins: 1

Number of wins by tour
- Ladies European Tour: 1

Liz Weima (born 19 September 1968) is a retired professional golfer from the Netherlands. She became the first Dutch player to win on the Ladies European Tour when she won the 1994 Dutch Ladies Open.

== Professional career ==
Weima only started playing golf at 18. She is naturally left-handed, but in golf, she plays right-handed.

Weima turned professional in 1992 and played on the Ladies European Tour for five years. The highlight of her career was her win at the 1994 Dutch Ladies Open, held in Rijk van Nijmegen. She herself attributes the win to the bad weather during the tournament. Rain, hail and cold winds caused several players to drop their game and she saw her chance to persevere and go for the title. She became the first Dutch player, male of female, to win at the European level. The first male winner was Rolf Muntz in 2000. The result came after she finished 12th at the Women's British Open the week before. She rose from 90th to 37th place in the 1994 LET Order of Merit following the tournament and ended the season in 34th place.

Weima was forced to retire from tour early due to a wrist injury. After retiring from tour, she became a board member of the Dutch Golf Federation and served as Tournament Director of the Dutch Ladies Open for over a decade.

In 2005, a bench with a plaque was placed on the first tee of Rijk van Nijmegen's Groesbeekse Course, commemorating her 1994 Dutch Ladies Open win.

== Professional wins (1) ==
=== Ladies European Tour (1) ===
| No. | Date | Tournament | Winning score | To par | Margin of victory | Runner-up |
|---|---|---|---|---|---|---|
| 1 | 11 Sep 1994 | Sens Ladies' Dutch Open | 214 | –2 | 2 strokes | (Sweden) Sofia Grönberg-Whitmore |
