= Variety Club Celebrity Classic =

Tournament information
- Location: Reading, Berkshire, England
- Established: 1988
- Course: Calcot Park Golf Club
- Tour: Ladies European Tour
- Format: 72-hole Stroke play
- Final year: 1990

Tournament record score
- Aggregate: 275 Alison Nicholas
- To par: −13 As above

Final champion
- (England) Alison Nicholas

The Variety Club Celebrity Classic was a women's professional golf tournament on the Ladies European Tour held in Berkshire, England. It was first played in 1988 and held annually until 1990.

== Winners ==
| Year | Winner | Country | Score | Margin of victory | Runner-up |
|---|---|---|---|---|---|
| 1990 | Alison Nicholas | England | 275 (−13) | 1 stroke | (Sweden) Sofia Grönberg |
| 1989 | Corinne Dibnah | Australia | 279 (−9) | 1 stroke | (United States) Peggy Conley |
| 1988 | Alison Nicholas | England | 204 (−12) | 4 strokes | (Scotland) Dale Reid |
