= Karina Ørum =

Danish professional golfer (born 1967)

Personal information
- Nationality: Denmark
- Born: 29 May 1967 (age 59)

Career
- Sport: Golf
- Turned professional: 1991
- Former tour: Ladies European Tour

Achievements and awards
- Danish Golfer of the Year: 1994

Karina Ørum (born 29 May 1967) is a Danish professional golfer. She was the first Danish member of the Ladies European Tour, where she finished runner-up four times 1993–1997 and narrowly missed out on a Solheim Cup place.

== Early life and amateur career ==
Ørum grew up the step-daughter to Peter Dangerfield, an English professional golfer who moved to Denmark as a club pro in the late 1970s. Her mother Lene ran the pro shop at the courses where the family worked; Furesø and Gilleleje Golf Clubs north of Copenhagen, Korsør Golf Club on the west coast of Sjaelland, and at Herning Golf Club on Jutland.

Ørum played on the National Team and represented Denmark at the 1989 European Ladies' Team Championship in Spain, where Denmark lost to England in the quarter-final. At the 1989 Nordic Championships in Hudiksvall, Sweden, she won the team title as well as the individual strokeplay title.

== Professional career ==
Ørum turned professional in 1991 and joined the Ladies European Tour. In 1993, she was runner-up at the VAR Open de France Feminin, one stroke behind home player Marie-Laure de Lorenzi, and was presented with the "Best Dressed" LET Player season award.

In 1994, Ørum led the Ladies Scottish Open by 2 strokes with 9 holes to go, but finished runner-up one stroke behind Laura Davies, who clinched her 31st career title. Ørum finished the season 10th in the Order of Merit, and was awarded with Den Gyldne Golfbold as Danish Golfer of the Year.

Ørum played well over the next three seasons and finished 13th on the LET Order of Merit in 1995, 17th in 1996 and 19th in 1997. She was in contention at the 1995 Ladies English Open, but again ended runner-up one stroke behind Laura Davies. At the 1997 LET season opener, the Estoril Ladies Open in Portugal, Ørum finished runner-up one stroke behind Mandy Sutton of Ireland. In 2000, her last full LET season, she finished 78th in the rankings.

Ørum caused a stir when she played at the 1998 Australian Ladies Open at Yarra Yarra Golf Club while seven months pregnant with her first son Thanda (a Zulu word meaning love), and again in 2002, almost eight months pregnant. She had to modify her technique with the baby bulge but quipped to the press "It's probably no different to swinging around a giant beer gut."

== Personal life ==
Ørum and her Australian partner settled at Hope Island on the Gold Coast, Queensland.

== Amateur wins ==
- 1989 Nordic Amateur Strokeplay Championship

== Team appearances ==
Amateur

- Nordic Ladies' Team Championship (representing Denmark): 1989 (winners)
- European Ladies' Team Championship (representing Denmark): 1989
