= Evening Mail =

The Evening Mail is the common name of several newspapers, including:

- Birmingham Evening Mail, based in Birmingham, England
- Dublin Evening Mail, based in Dublin, Ireland
- North-West Evening Mail, based in Barrow-in-Furness, Cumbria, England
- Nelson Evening Mail, based in Nelson, New Zealand
- New York Evening Mail, based in New York City, United States
