= Patricia Meunier-Lebouc =

French professional golfer (born 1972)

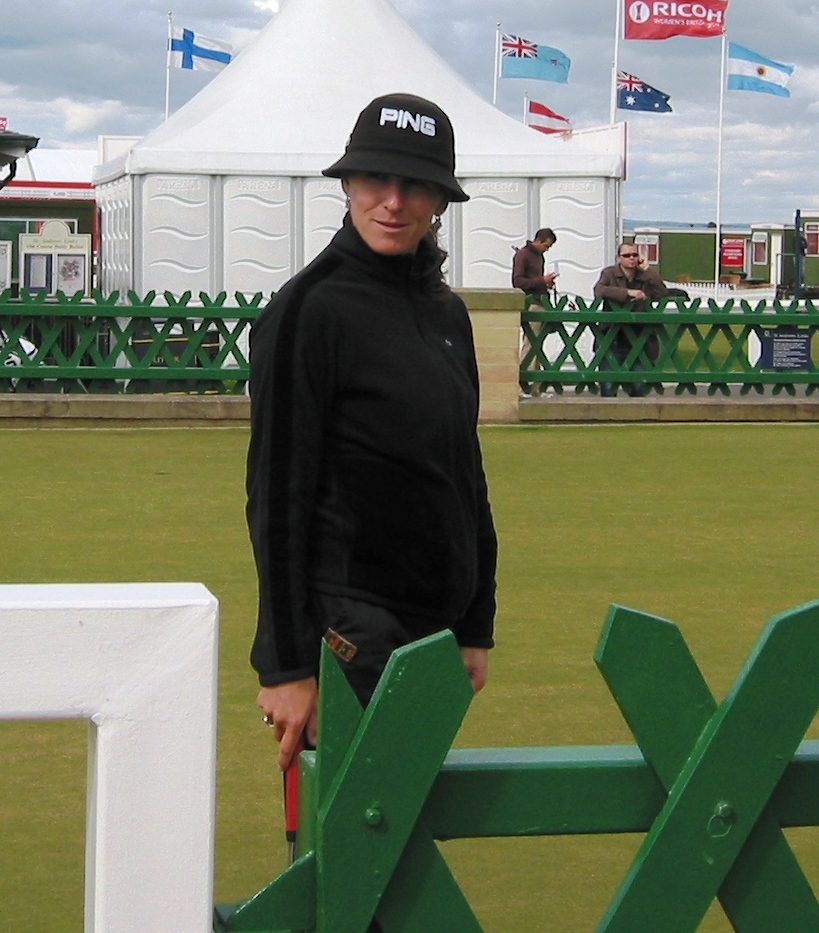

Personal information
- Full name: Patricia Meunier-Lebouc
- Nationality: France
- Born: 16 November 1972 (age 53) Dijon, France
- Height: 5 ft 6 in (1.68 m)
- Spouse: Antoine Lebouc
- Children: 1

Career
- Sport: Golf
- Turned professional: 1994
- Former tours: Ladies European Tour; LPGA Tour
- Professional wins: 9

Number of wins by tour
- LPGA Tour: 2
- Ladies European Tour: 5
- Other: 2

Best results in LPGA major championships (wins: 1)
- Chevron Championship: Won: 2003
- Women's PGA C'ship: T11: 2003
- U.S. Women's Open: T10: 2006
- du Maurier Classic: DNP
- Women's British Open: 5th: 2003
Medal record
Mediterranean Games
Silver medal – second place	1993 Languedoc-Roussillon	Women's team

Patricia Meunier-Lebouc (born 16 November 1972) is a French former professional golfer who played on the Ladies European Tour and the LPGA Tour. Her birth name was Meunier and she is married to Antoine Lebouc, a French professional golfer who played on the European Tour in the 1990s.

== Amateur career ==
Meunier was born in Dijon, France. She won the French Cup and the Greece International in 1993. In 1992, she won the French Ladies Championship, placed fifth in the World Team Championship and finished third at the European Team Junior Championship.

== Professional career ==
Meunier-Lebouc turned professional in 1994 and initially played on the Ladies European Tour, gaining her maiden victory in her rookie season at the Waterford English Open. She has won 5 more times on the LET and finished in the top 10 in the Order of Merit in 1997 and 2000. She qualified for the LPGA Tour by tying for 27th at the LPGA Final Qualifying Tournament to earn non-exempt status for the 2001 season.

In her rookie year in 2001, Meunier-Lebouc recorded two top-ten finishes, then won the State Farm Classic in 2002, and the Kraft Nabisco Championship in 2003, a major title. She was the 54-hole leader at the 2003 Women's British Open, but finished in solo fifth place. In February 2004, she gave birth to her first child, daughter Phildine Pearl, and opted not to defend her title at the 2004 Kraft Nabisco Championship in late March.

In 2000, Meunier-Lebouc became the first French player to compete in the Solheim Cup, and returned in 2003.

Meunier-Lebouc retired from playing professional golf in 2009, and became a golf instructor at the Ibis Golf & Country Club in 2010.

== Professional wins (9) ==
=== LPGA Tour wins (2) ===
Legend
LPGA Tour major championships (1)
Other LPGA Tour (1)

No.	Date	Tournament	Winning score	Margin of victory	Runner(s)-up
1	1 Sep 2002	State Farm Classic	−18 (64-67-72-67=270)	2 strokes	(South Korea) Mi-Hyun Kim (South Korea) Se Ri Pak
2	30 Mar 2003	Kraft Nabisco Championship	−7 (70-68-70-73=281)	1 stroke	(Sweden) Annika Sörenstam

=== Ladies European Tour wins (5) ===
- 1994 (1) Waterford Dairies Ladies' English Open
- 1997 (1) Guardian Irish Open
- 1998 (1) Air France Madame Open
- 2000 (2) Open de France Dames, Ladies Austrian Open

=== Other wins (1) ===
- 1997 (1) Praia D'el Rey European Cup (team competition)

=== Legends of the LPGA wins (1) ===
- 2023 BJ's Charity Championship (with Jane Blalock)

== Major championships ==
=== Wins (1) ===
Year	Championship	Winning score	Margin	Runner-up
2003	Kraft Nabisco Championship	−7 (70-68-70-73=281)	1 stroke	(Sweden) Annika Sörenstam

=== Results timeline ===
Tournament	2001	2002	2003	2004	2005	2006	2007	2008	2009
Kraft Nabisco Championship			1		CUT	T29	CUT	WD	WD
LPGA Championship		T61	T11	T30	CUT	CUT	T81	CUT	
U.S. Women's Open		63	T13	T13	CUT	T10	CUT	CUT	
Women's British Open	T64	T24	5	T38	CUT	T42	CUT		

Win
Top 10
Did not play

CUT = missed the half-way cut
WD = withdrew
"T" = tied

=== Summary ===
Tournament	Wins	2nd	3rd	Top-5	Top-10	Top-25	Events	Cuts made
Kraft Nabisco Championship	1	0	0	1	1	1	6	2
LPGA Championship	0	0	0	0	0	1	7	4
U.S. Women's Open	0	0	0	0	1	3	7	4
Women's British Open	0	0	0	1	1	2	7	5
Totals	1	0	0	2	3	7	27	15

- Most consecutive cuts made – 11 (2001 British – 2004 British)
- Longest streak of top-10s – 1 (three times)

== LPGA Tour career summary ==
Year	Majors	Other wins	LPGA wins	Earnings ($)	Money list rank	Average
2001	0	0	0	108,000	82	72.53
2002	0	1	1	354,175	28	72.14
2003	1	0	1	688,072	14	70.75
2004	0	0	0	319,070	37	71.49
2005	0	0	0	61,074	103	73.49

== Team appearances ==
Amateur

- Espirito Santo Trophy (representing France): 1992
- European Ladies' Team Championship (representing France): 1993

Professional

- Solheim Cup (representing Europe): 2000 (winners), 2003 (winners)
- World Cup (representing France): 2005

=== Solheim Cup record ===
Year	Total matches	Total W-L-H	Singles W-L-H	Foursomes W-L-H	Fourballs W-L-H	Points won	Points %
Career	4	2-1-1	1-1-0	0-0-0	1-0-1	2.5	62.5%
2000	2	0-1-1	0-1-0 lost to M. Mallon 1dn		0-0-1 halved w/L. Neumann	0.5	25%
2003	2	2-0-0	1-0-0 def K. Robbins conceded on 12		1-0-0 won w/S. Pettersen 3&2	2	100%
