= Helen Wadsworth =

Welsh professional golfer

Personal information
- Nationality: Wales
- Born: 7 April 1964 (age 62)

Career
- Sport: Golf
- College: Wake Forest University
- Turned professional: 1991
- Former tour: Ladies European Tour
- Professional wins: 3

Number of wins by tour
- Ladies European Tour: 1
- Ladies Asian Golf Tour: 1
- Other: 1

Best results in LPGA major championships
- Chevron Championship: DNP
- Women's PGA C'ship: DNP
- U.S. Women's Open: T41: 1998
- du Maurier Classic: DNP
- Women's British Open: DNP

Achievements and awards
- Ladies European Tour Rookie of the Year: 1991

Helen Wadsworth (born 7 April 1964) is a former Welsh professional golfer on the Ladies European Tour.

== Career ==
Prior to turning professional, Wadsworth was runner-up in the 1990 Welsh Ladies' Amateur Championship, runner-up to Julie Wade in the 1990 British Ladies Amateur, won the 1990 World Fourball Championship (with Julie Wade) in Brazil, and was a member of the 1990 Great Britain and Ireland Curtis Cup team. She played collegiate golf with the Wake Forest Demon Deacons.

In her first year as a professional, Wadsworth had three top-10 finishes, winning her the Ladies European Tour Rookie of the Year Award. In 1994, she won the BMW European Masters and took second place at the Irish Open. In 1996 she placed second at the McDonald's WPGA Championship of Europe at Gleneagles and in 1997 she won the Sunningdale Foursomes. She won the Taiwan Ladies Open in 1998.

In 2002, she was voted to a position on the Atlantic Coast Conference's 50th anniversary golf team.

== Professional wins (3) ==
=== Ladies European Tour wins (1) ===
Date	Tournament	Winning score	To par	Margin of victory	Runner-up
26 Jun 1994	BMW European Masters	278	−14	2 strokes	(United States) Tracy Hanson

=== Ladies Asian Golf Tour wins (1) ===
Date	Tournament	Winning score	To par	Margin of victory	Runner-up
24 Jan 1998	Taiwan Ladies Open	70-78=148	+4	2 strokes	(United States) Laura Philo

=== Other wins (1) ===
- 1997 Sunningdale Foursomes (with Julie Hall)

== Team appearances ==
Amateur

- European Ladies' Team Championship (representing Wales): 1987, 1989
- Curtis Cup (representing Great Britain & Ireland): 1990
