= Lora Fairclough =

English professional golfer (born 1970)

Personal information
- Full name: Lora Diane Fairclough
- Nationality: England
- Born: 26 January 1970 (age 56) Chorley, England
- Height: 1.63 m (5 ft 4 in)

Career
- Sport: Golf
- Turned professional: 1991
- Former tours: Ladies European Tour (1991–2009); LPGA Tour (1998–1999)
- Professional wins: 8

Number of wins by tour
- Ladies European Tour: 4
- Other: 4

Best results in LPGA major championships
- Chevron Championship: DNP
- Women's PGA C'ship: DNP
- U.S. Women's Open: DNP
- du Maurier Classic: DNP
- Women's British Open: T21: 2001

Lora Diane Fairclough (born 26 January 1970) is an English professional golfer.

== Career ==
Fairclough was born in Chorley, Lancashire in 1970

Fairclough turned professional in 1991. She played on the Ladies European Tour and won four individual tournaments on it. She also made the top-10 on the Order of Merit five times between 1993 and 1999 and was a member of Europe's 1994 Solheim Cup team.

== Professional wins (8) ==
=== Ladies European Tour wins (4) ===
- 1993 IBM Ladies' Open
- 1995 Ford Golf Classic, Ladies European Masters
- 1998 Ladies' German Open

=== Other wins (4) ===
- 1996 Lalla Meryem Cup, Ladies Mauritius Open
- 1999 Lalla Meryem Cup
- 2006 Women's Mauritius Open

== Team appearances ==
Amateur

- European Ladies' Team Championship (representing England): 1989
- Vagliano Trophy (representing Great Britain & Ireland): 1989 (winners)

Professional

- Solheim Cup (representing Europe): 1994
