= Solheim Cup =

Women's golf competition between the USA and Europe

Tournament information
- Location: Europe or United States
- Established: 1990
- Tours: Ladies European Tour; LPGA Tour
- Format: Match play
- Prize fund: None
- Month played: September

Current champion
- Europe

Current tournament
- 2026 Solheim Cup

The Solheim Cup is a biennial golf tournament for professional women golfers contested by teams representing Europe and the United States. It is named after the Norwegian-American golf club manufacturer Karsten Solheim, who was a driving force behind its creation.

The inaugural Cup was held in 1990, and the event was first staged in even numbered years until 2002, alternating years with the Ryder Cup (the equivalent men's event). As part of the general reshuffling of team golf events after the one-year postponement of the 2001 Ryder Cup following the September 11 attacks, the Solheim Cup switched to odd numbered years beginning in 2003. Another reshuffle of team golf events took place in 2020 due to the COVID-19 pandemic and the Solheim Cup returned to even numbered years beginning in 2024.

The United States teams have won the cup eleven times, compared with nine for Europe. The current holders are Europe, who regained the cup with a 15–13 win in 2026.

== The cup ==
The trophy is a cut-glass Irish Waterford Crystal, designed in 1990 by one of Waterford's top designers, Billy Briggs. Weight: about 20 pounds. Height: 19 inches, including the mahogany base. Diameter of wooden base: 8 inches. Diameter at top: 4 inches.

== Format ==
The tournament is played over three days. Since 2002, there have been 28 matches—eight foursomes and eight four-balls played on days 1 and 2, and 12 singles on the final day. This format is also used in the Ryder Cup. Before 1996, and also in 2000, the Solheim Cup used a similar, but abbreviated format.

One point is awarded to the team that wins each match; in the event of a tie, both teams score half a point. After all matches are complete, the team with more points wins or retains the Cup. Any ties are broken in favor of the defending champion team.

In addition to the indicated number of players, each team includes one captain and a set number of assistant captains (three as of 2015), none of whom play in the matches.

Year	Day 1		Day 2		Day 3	Total Points	Players per team
Year	Morning	Afternoon	Morning	Afternoon	Day 3	Total Points	Players per team
1990	4 foursomes		4 fourballs		8 singles	16	8
1992	4 foursomes		4 fourballs		10 singles	18	10
1994	5 foursomes		5 fourballs		10 singles	20	10
1996–1998	4 foursomes	4 fourballs	4 foursomes	4 fourballs	12 singles	28	12
2000	4 foursomes	4 foursomes	6 fourballs		12 singles	26	12
2002– present	4 foursomes	4 fourballs	4 foursomes	4 fourballs	12 singles	28	12
2002– present	or		or		12 singles	28	12
2002– present	4 fourballs	4 foursomes	4 fourballs	4 foursomes	12 singles	28	12

== Team qualification and selection ==
The U.S. team is selected by a points system, with American players on the LPGA Tour receiving points for each top-twenty finish on tour. Through the 2013 event, U.S. citizens born outside the country were ineligible for consideration; beginning in 2015, eligibility for Team USA was expanded to include many more categories of (female) U.S. citizens. (Note: More specifically, the following groups of women became eligible: Those born outside the U.S., but who received U.S. citizenship at birth.; Those who were naturalized in the U.S. before age 18.; Those who automatically became citizens via adoption prior to age 13.) For the European team, up to 2005, seven players were selected on a points system based on results on the Ladies European Tour (LET). This allowed top European players who competed mainly on the LPGA Tour to be selected to ensure that the European team was competitive. Since 2007, only the top five players from the LET qualify and another four are selected on the basis of the Women's World Golf Rankings. This reflects the increasing dominance of the LPGA Tour, where almost all top European players spend most of their time. In addition, each team has a number of "captain's picks", players chosen at the discretion of the team captains, regardless of their point standings, though in practice the captain's picks are often the next ranking players.

Imperial has served as the official headwear supplier for the U.S. Solheim Cup team since at least 2015.

== Captains ==
Team captains are typically recently retired professional golfers with Solheim Cup playing experience, chosen for their experience playing on previous Cup teams and for their ability to lead a team.

== Results ==
Year	Winners	Score	Host location	Course	U.S. captain	European captain	U.S. top point scorer (Note: If more than one player ties for top points scorer, players with the highest win% are shown)	European top point scorer
2026	Europe	15–13	Netherlands; Europe	Bernardus Golf, Cromvoirt, North Brabant	Angela; Stanford	Anna; Nordqvist	Lee; 4 / 4	Grant; 4 / 4
2024	United States	15 1/2–12 1/2	Virginia; United States	Robert Trent Jones Golf Club, Gainesville	Stacy; Lewis	Suzann; Pettersen	Zhang; 4 / 4	Hull; 3 / 5
2023	Tied; Europe retained	14–14	Spain; Europe	Finca Cortesin, Málaga, Andalusia	Stacy; Lewis	Suzann; Pettersen	Khang; 3.5 / 4	Ciganda; 4 / 4
2021	Europe	15–13	Ohio; United States	Inverness Club, Toledo	Pat; Hurst	Catriona; Matthew	Kupcho; Salas; 2.5 / 4	Maguire; 4.5 / 5
2019	Europe	14 1/2–13 1/2	Scotland; Europe	Gleneagles Hotel (PGA Centenary), Perthshire	Juli; Inkster	Catriona; Matthew	J. Korda; N. Korda; 3.5 / 4	Boutier; Hall; 4 / 4
2017	United States	16 1/2–11 1/2	Iowa; United States	Des Moines Golf and Country Club, West Des Moines	Juli; Inkster	Annika; Sörenstam	Kerr; 3.5 / 4	Nordqvist; 3.5 / 4
2015	United States	14 1/2–13 1/2	Germany; Europe	Golf Club St. Leon-Rot, St. Leon-Rot, Baden-Württemberg	Juli; Inkster	Carin; Koch	Kerr; Piller; 3.5 / 4	Hull; 4 / 5
2013	Europe	18–10	Colorado; United States	Colorado Golf Club, Parker	Meg; Mallon	Liselotte; Neumann	Lang; 3 / 4	Hedwall; 5 / 5
2011	Europe	15–13	Ireland; Europe	Killeen Castle Golf Resort, County Meath	Rosie; Jones	Alison; Nicholas	Pressel; 4 / 4	Gustafson; 4 / 4
2009	United States	16–12	Illinois; United States	Rich Harvest Farms, Big Rock Township, Kane County	Beth; Daniel	Alison; Nicholas	Wie; 3.5 / 4	Nocera; 3.5 / 4
2007	United States	16–12	Sweden; Europe	Halmstad Golf Club, Tylösand, Halmstad Municipality, Halland	Betsy; King	Helen; Alfredsson	Creamer; 3.5 / 5	Matthew; 3 / 4
2005	United States	15 1/2–12 1/2	Indiana; United States	Crooked Stick Golf Club, Carmel	Nancy; Lopez	Catrin; Nismark	Creamer; 3.5 / 5	Sörenstam; 4 / 5
2003	Europe	17 1/2–10 1/2	Sweden; Europe	Barsebäck Golf & Country Club, Barsebäck, Scania	Patty; Sheehan	Catrin; Nismark	Inkster; Kerr; 3 / 4	Pettersen; Sörenstam; 4 / 5
2002	United States	15 1/2–12 1/2	Minnesota; United States	Interlachen Country Club, Edina	Patty; Sheehan	Dale; Reid	Diaz; Klein; Mallon; 3 / 4	Koch; 4.5 / 5
2000	Europe	14 1/2–11 1/2	Scotland; Europe	Loch Lomond Golf Club, Luss, Argyll & Bute	Pat; Bradley	Dale; Reid	Robbins; 3 / 4	Koch; Nilsmark; 3 / 3
1998	United States	16–12	Ohio; United States	Muirfield Village, Dublin	Judy; Rankin	Pia; Nilsson	Pepper; 4 / 4	Davies; 3.5 / 5
1996	United States	17–11	Wales; Europe	St Pierre Golf & Country Club, Monmouthshire	Judy; Rankin	Mickey; Walker	King; 3 / 3	Sörenstam; 4 / 5
1994	United States	13–7	West Virginia; United States	The Greenbrier, White Sulphur Springs	Joanne; Carner	Mickey; Walker	Burton; Mochrie; 3 / 3	Alfredsson; Fairclough; Nicholas; Reid; 2 / 3
1992	Europe	11 1/2–6 1/2	Scotland; Europe	Dalmahoy Country Club, Edinburgh	Kathy; Whitworth	Mickey; Walker	Mallon; 2 / 3	Davies; 3 / 3
1990	United States	11 1/2–4 1/2	Florida; United States	Lake Nona Golf & Country Club, Orlando	Kathy; Whitworth	Mickey; Walker	Daniel; 3 / 3	Davies; 2 / 3

In the 20 competitions through 2026, the United States leads the series 11–8–1 with Europe retaining as holders when the teams tied in 2023.

== Future venues ==
Year	Hosts	Course	Location	Dates	Last hosted	Ref
2028	United States	Valhalla Golf Club	Louisville, Kentucky	4−10 September	n/a	

Valhalla Golf Club has hosted the men's PGA Championship four times in 1996, 2000, 2014 and 2024 as well as the Senior PGA Championship twice in 2004 and 2011. Despite being a first-time Solheim Cup venue, it previously hosted the Ryder Cup in 2008 and will become just the fourth course after The Greenbrier, Muirfield Village and the Gleneagles Hotel's PGA Centenary to host both events.

== Records ==
- Most appearances: 12
  ° Laura Davies (Eur), 1990–2011
- Most points: 25
  ° Laura Davies (Eur) (22–18–6 record)
- Most singles points won: 7
  ° Juli Inkster (USA) (6–1–2 record)
- Most foursome points won: 11 1/2
  ° Annika Sörenstam (Eur) (11–3–1 record)
- Most fourball points won: 11 1/2
  ° Cristie Kerr (USA) (11–5–1 record)
- Top point percentage (Minimum of 3 Solheim Cup Matches)
  ° Janice Moodie (Eur) (7–2–2) 72.7%
  ° Carin Koch (Eur) (10–3–3) 71.9%
  ° Leona Maguire (Eur) (8–3–1) 70.8%
  ° Dottie Pepper (USA) (13–5–2) 70.0%
  ° Christina Kim (USA) (6–2–2) 70.0%
- Most points in a single contest: 5
  ° Caroline Hedwall (Eur) 2013
- Longest winning streak: 7 matches
  ° Carin Koch (Eur) 2000–2002
  ° Morgan Pressel (USA) 2009–2013
- Longest unbeaten streak: 10 matches
  ° Paula Creamer (USA) 2005–2009
- Youngest player: 17 years, 149 days
  ° Charley Hull (Eur) 2013
- Oldest player: 51 years, 91 days
  ° Juli Inkster (USA) 2011

== See also ==
- Junior Solheim Cup
- List of American Solheim Cup golfers
- List of European Solheim Cup golfers
