= Suzanne Strudwick =

English professional golfer (born 1965)

Personal information
- Full name: Suzanne P. Strudwick
- Nationality: England
- Born: 4 July 1965 (age 61) Cheshire, England
- Height: 5 ft 7 in (1.70 m)

Career
- Sport: Golf
- College: Stafford College
- Turned professional: 1983
- Former tours: Ladies European Tour; LPGA Tour (1993–2007)
- Professional wins: 2

Number of wins by tour
- Ladies European Tour: 2

Best results in LPGA major championships
- Chevron Championship: T48: 1994
- Women's PGA C'ship: T31: 1997
- U.S. Women's Open: T16: 1992
- du Maurier Classic: T40: 1999
- Women's British Open: T46: 2001

Achievements and awards
- LPGA Rookie of the Year: 1993

Suzanne P. Strudwick (born 4 July 1965 in Cheshire, England) is an English professional golfer.

== Career ==
In 1983, she turned professional. She joined the Women Professional Golfers' European Tour (now the Ladies European Tour) the same year.

In 1993, she joined the U.S.-based LPGA Tour and was rookie of the year in her first season. She made the top 100 on the LPGA Tour money list nine times, but never rose higher than 68th.

Strudwick played a full tournament schedule until 2004, she then developed her own golf academy based in Knoxville, Tennessee, United States.

In 2013, she was hired to be the women's golf head coach at Carson–Newman University in Jefferson City, Tennessee. In 2021, Strudwick was promoted to be a full-time administrator at Carson-Newman University, Assistant Athletic Director for Compliance. In 2022, she was promoted to Associate Athletic Director. In 2025, Strudwick was hired as only the third Athletic Director at Cleveland State Community College in Cleveland, Tennessee.

== Awards and honors ==
In 1993, Strudwick earned LPGA Rookie of the Year honors.

== Professional wins (2) ==
=== Ladies European Tour wins (2) ===
- 1989 Open de France Dames
- 1991 AGF Ladies' Open
