= Evelyn Orley =

Swiss golfer (born 1966)

Personal information
- Full name: Evelyn Ruth Orley
- Nationality: Switzerland
- Born: 10 July 1966 (age 60) Zürich, Switzerland

Career
- Sport: Golf
- Partner: Liselotte Neumann
- College: Duke University
- Turned professional: 1990
- Former tours: Ladies European Tour; LPGA Tour
- Professional wins: 2

Number of wins by tour
- Ladies European Tour: 1
- Ladies Asian Golf Tour: 1

Evelyn Orley (born 10 July 1966) is a Swiss former professional golfer.

== Family ==
Orley's grandfather Zoltan Őssy-Őlvy represented Hungary in the 1936 Summer Olympics in shooting, and her father Thomas Orley, born in Budapest, competed in fencing for the U.S. in the 1964 Summer Olympics. Her father later moved to Switzerland, where Evelyn was born. Her ultimate dream in golf had been to compete in the Olympics, even petitioning the International Olympic Committee in 1988 to add the sport.

== Career ==
Orley won the 1983 Girls Amateur Championship and played college golf with the Duke Blue Devils at Duke University in Durham, North Carolina where she won the 1985 ACC Championship individually.

She turned pro in 1990 and won twice that year, claiming the Singapore Ladies Open and the Swiss Ladies Classic, her native country's national championship, the highlight of her career. In 1991 she was runner-up at the Ladies English Open after losing a playoff with Kitrina Douglas, and in 1992 she was runner-up at the Ford Ladies Classic. When she missed 19 of 20 cuts on the 1993 LPGA Tour, Orley started planning for a future outside of golf. She returned to LET and was runner-up at the 1995 Costa Azul Ladies Open, but soon retired from tour and became a sales director for an investment management firm.

Orley regained her amateur status in 2002. She turned 50 in July 2016 and played the U.S. Senior Women's Amateur, returning to competition golf after a 20-year hiatus, with 1988 U.S. Women's Open-winner Liselotte Neumann as her caddie. The qualifier where she shot 72 to earn medalist honors was her first competitive round since retiring from tour. She competed in the inaugural U.S. Senior Women's Open in 2018.

== Professional wins (2) ==
=== Ladies European Tour wins (1) ===
- 1990 Bonmont Ladies Swiss Classic

=== Ladies Asian Golf Tour wins (1) ===
- 1990 Singapore Ladies Open

== Team appearances ==
Amateur

- Espirito Santo Trophy (representing Switzerland): 1984, 1986, 1988
- European Ladies' Team Championship (representing Switzerland): 1985
