= Alison Nicholas =

English professional golfer (born 1962)

Alison Nicholas MBE
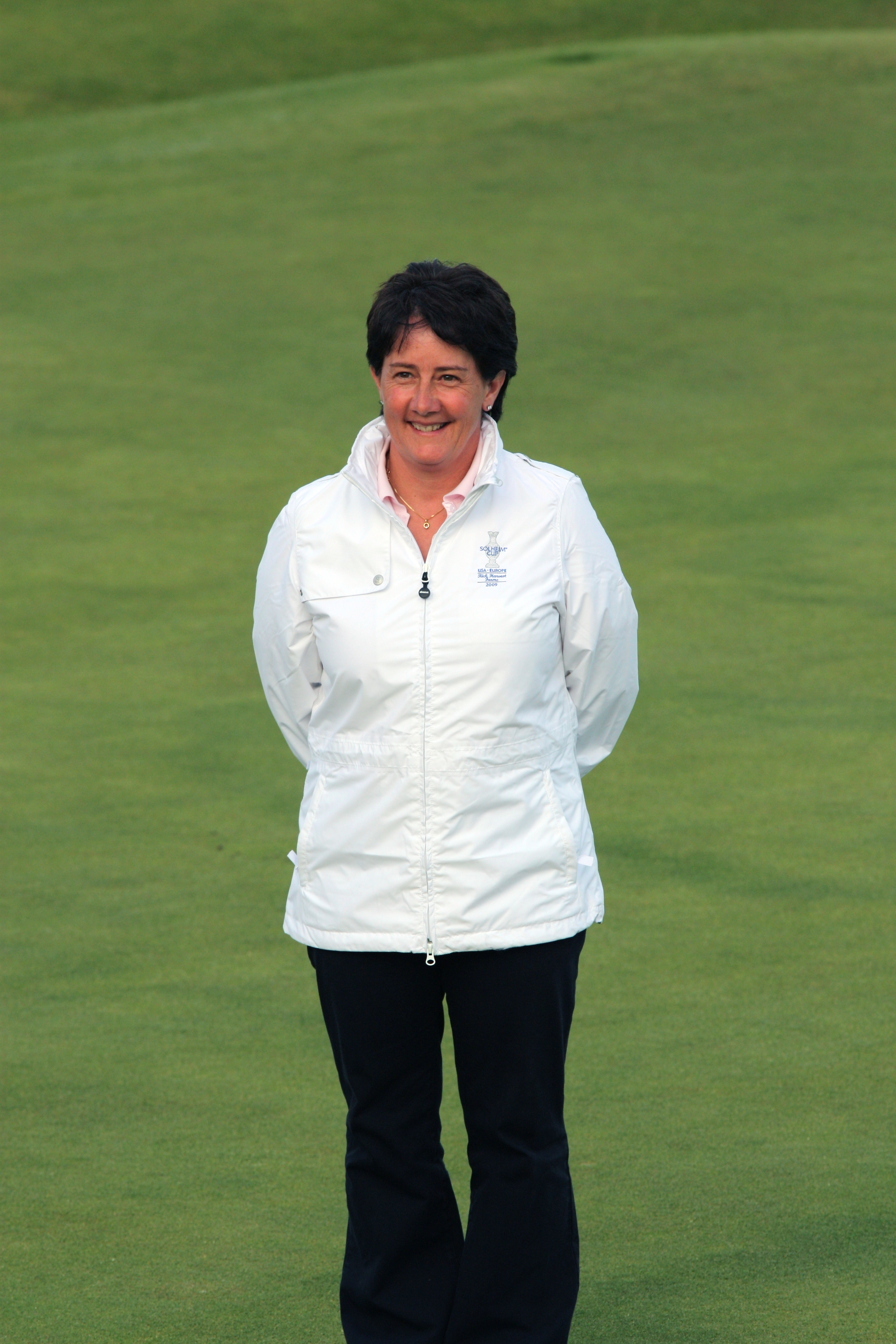
- Nicholas at the official announcement of the 2009 Solheim Cup team

Personal information
- Full name: Alison Nicholas
- Nationality: England
- Born: 6 March 1962 (age 64) Gibraltar
- Height: 1.52 m (5 ft 0 in)

Career
- Sport: Golf
- Turned professional: 1984
- Former tours: Ladies European Tour (joined 1984); LPGA Tour (joined 1989)
- Professional wins: 18

Number of wins by tour
- LPGA Tour: 4
- Ladies European Tour: 12 (10th all-time)
- Other: 2

Best results in LPGA major championships (wins: 1)
- Chevron Championship: T16: 1995
- Women's PGA C'ship: T23: 2000
- U.S. Women's Open: Won: 1997
- du Maurier Classic: CUT: 1997
- Women's British Open: 28th: 2004

Achievements and awards
- Ladies European Tour Order of Merit: 1997
- Ladies European Tour Player of the Year: 1997

Alison Nicholas MBE (born 6 March 1962) is an English professional golfer. She is best known for winning the 1997 U.S. Women's Open.

== Early life and amateur career ==
In 1962, Nicholas was born in Gibraltar. She was educated at the School of St Mary and St Anne (now Abbots Bromley School for Girls).

She enjoyed a very successful amateur career in England. She started playing golf at the age of 17 and won the 1982 and 1983 Northern Girls Amateur Open. Nicholas was the 1983 British Amateur Stroke Play champion. In 1983, Nicholas won the Yorkshire Ladies County Championship.

== Professional career ==
In 1984, Nicholas turned professional. She joined the Ladies European Tour in the same year. She joined the LPGA Tour in 1989.

Nicholas won the Women's British Open in 1987, when it was recognised as a major championship by the Ladies European Tour only, and the 1997 U.S. Women's Open. She became the seventh player to have won both the British and U.S. Open titles, joining Laura Davies, Jane Geddes, Betsy King, Patty Sheehan, Liselotte Neumann and Annika Sörenstam.

At her retirement at the end of the 2004 season, Nicholas had won 12 events on the Ladies European Tour. She topped the European Tour Order of Merit in 1997 and finished in the top-10 15 times in 16 seasons between 1985 and 2000. She also won four times on the LPGA Tour, between 1995 and 1999, including winning the U.S. Women's Open in 1997. In 1992, she won both the Western Australian Open and the Malaysian Open.

Nicholas was a member of the European Solheim Cup team in 1990, 1992, 1994, 1996, 1998 and 2000, forming a formidable partnership with Laura Davies. She was non-playing assistant captain in 2005. In 2007, Nicholas was selected captain for the 2009 and 2011 European Solheim Cup teams. In 2011, she led the European team to a 15–13 victory at Killeen Castle outside Dublin, Ireland.

== Awards and honors ==
- In 1991, she won the Vivien Saunders Trophy for lowest stroke average on the Ladies European Tour.
- In 1997, she was Player of the Year on the Ladies European Tour. She also led the Order of Merit.
- In 1997, she was honored as the The Sunday Times Sportswomen of the Year and The Evening Mail Sports Personality of the Year.
- In 1997, she was also awarded The Association of Golf Writers Trophy and the Midlands Sports Personality of the Year.
- In the 1998 Birthday Honours, she was appointed a Member of the Order of the British Empire (MBE) for services to women's golf.
- In 2002, became a Life Member of the Ladies European Tour.

== Professional wins (18) ==
=== LPGA Tour wins (4) ===
Legend
LPGA Tour major championships (1)
Other LPGA Tour (3)

No.	Date	Tournament	Winning score	Margin of victory	Runner(s)-up
1	28 May 1995	LPGA Corning Classic	−13 (70-67-66-72=275)	3 strokes	(United States) Barb Mucha
2	10 Sep 1995	Ping-AT&T Wireless Services LPGA Golf Championship	−9 (66-73-68=207)	3 strokes	(United States) Kelly Robbins
3	13 Jul 1997	U.S. Women's Open	−10 (70-66-67-71=274)	1 stroke	(United States) Nancy Lopez
4	20 Feb 1999	Sunrise Hawaiian Ladies Open	−7 (70-66-73=209)	1 stroke	(United States) Annette DeLuca (United States) Moira Dunn

LPGA Tour playoff record (0–1)

No.	Year	Tournament	Opponent	Result
1	1993	LPGA Corning Classic	(United States) Kelly Robbins	Lost to par on first extra hole

=== Ladies European Tour wins (12) ===
No.	Date	Tournament	Winning score	Margin of victory	Runner(s)-up
1	2 Aug 1987	Weetabix Women's British Open	+4 (74-76-73-73=296)	1 stroke	(England) Laura Davies (United States) Muffin Spencer-Devlin
2	26 Sep 1987	Laing Charity Classic	−8 (76-67-69-69=281)	2 strokes	(Australia) Corinne Dibnah
3	21 May 1988	British Olivetti Tournament	−9 (71-72-69-71=283)	1 stroke	(Scotland) Jane Connachan
4	4 Sep 1988	Variety Club Celebrity Classic	−12 (68-67-69=204)	4 strokes	(Scotland) Dale Reid
5	2 Oct 1988	James Capel Guernsey Open	−14 (68-72-67-67= 274)	2 strokes	(South Africa) Alison Sheard
6	30 Jul 1989	Lufthansa Ladies' German Open	−19 (67-69-68-65=269)	5 strokes	(Colombia) Patricia Gonzalez
7	27 Aug 1989	Gislaved Ladies Open	E (73-72-69-74=288)	2 strokes	(Sweden) Liselotte Neumann
8	3 Nov 1989	Qualitair Classic	−3 (69-74-70=213)	2 strokes	(United States) Peggy Conley (Sweden) Sofia Grönberg
9	2 Sep 1990	Variety Club Celebrity Classic (2)	−13 (68-68-68-71=275)	1 stroke	(Sweden) Sofia Grönberg
10	10 May 1992	AGF Ladies' Open de Paris	−9 (66-68-73-68=275)	1 stroke	(Peru) Alicia Dibos
11	6 Aug 1995	Payne & Gunter Scottish Open	−16 (66-67-70-69=272)	1 stroke	(France) Patricia Meunier
12	28 Jul 1996	Guardian Irish Open	−11 (69-73-65-70=277)	8 strokes	(England) Trish Johnson

Ladies European Tour Tour playoff record (0–1)

No.	Year	Tournament	Opponent	Result
1	1990	Laing Ladies Charity Classic	(South Africa) Laurette Maritz	Lost

Note: Nicholas won the Women's British Open once before it was co-sanctioned by the LPGA Tour in 1994, and recognized as a major championship on the LPGA Tour in 2001.

=== Other wins (2) ===
- 1992 Western Australian Open, Malaysia Ladies Open

== Major championships ==
=== Wins (1) ===
Year	Championship	Winning score	Margin	Runner-up
1997	U.S. Women's Open	−10 (70-66-67-71=274)	1 stroke	(United States) Nancy Lopez

== Team appearances ==
Professional

- Solheim Cup (representing Europe): 1990, 1992 (winners), 1994, 1996, 1998, 2000 (winners), 2009 (non-playing captain), 2011 (non-playing captain) (winners)
- Handa Cup (representing World team): 2008, 2009, 2010, 2011, 2012 (tie), 2013 (winners), 2014

=== Solheim Cup record ===
Year	Total matches	Total W–L–H	Singles W–L–H	Foursomes W–L–H	Fourballs W–L–H	Points won	Points %
Career	18	7–8–3	1–3–2	4–3–0	2–2–1	8.5	47.22%
1990	3	1–2–0	0–1–0 lost to N. Lopez 6&4	1–0–0 won w/L. Davies 2&1	0–1–0 lost w/L. Davies 4&3	1	33.3%
1992	3	2–1–0	0–1–0 lost to J. Inkster 3&2	1–0–0 won w/L. Davies 1up	1–0–0 won w/L. Davies 1up	2	66.7%
1994	3	2–1–0	1–0–0 def P. Sheehan 3&2	1–0–0 won w/L.Davies 2&1	0–1–0 lost w/L.Davies 2&1	2	66.7%
1996	3	0–1–2	0–0–1 halved w/ K. Robbins	0–1–0 lost w/L. Davies 1dn	0–0–1 halved w/H. Alfredsson	1	33.3%
1998	2	0–2–0	0–1–0 lost to T. Green 1dn	0–1–0 lost w/H. Alfredsson 3&1		0	0%
2000	4	2–1–1	0–0–1 halved w/S. Steinhauer	1–1–0 won w/L. Davies 4&3, lost w/L.Davies 6&5	1–0–0 won w/H. Alfredsson 3&2	2.5	62.5%

== See also ==
- List of golfers with most Ladies European Tour wins
