= Corinne Dibnah =

Australian professional golfer

Personal information
- Nationality: Australia
- Born: 29 July 1962 (age 64) Brisbane, Australia
- Height: 1.68 m (5 ft 6 in)
- Life partner: Dale Reid

Career
- Sport: Golf
- Turned professional: 1984
- Former tours: ALPG Tour; Ladies European Tour
- Professional wins: 20

Number of wins by tour
- Ladies European Tour: 13 (8th all-time)
- Ladies Asian Golf Tour: 4
- WPGA Tour of Australasia: 3

Best results in LPGA major championships
- Chevron Championship: T20: 1987
- U.S. Women's Open: CUT: 1989, 1992
- Women's British Open: CUT: 2001, 2002, 2003

Achievements and awards
- Ladies European Tour Order of Merit winner: 1991

Corinne Dibnah (born 29 July 1962) is an Australian professional golfer.

== Career ==
Dibnah played on the ALPG Tour and the Ladies European Tour (LET). She won the 1991 LET Order of Merit after winning three tour events that year.

== Awards and honors ==
In 1991, she won the Ladies European Tour Order of Merit.

== Amateur wins ==
- 1981 Australian Women's Amateur
- 1983 NSW Junior Amateur, NSW Ladies Amateur, New Zealand 72 Hole Strokeplay Championship, New Zealand Ladies Amateur

== Professional wins (20) ==
=== Ladies European Tour wins (13) ===
- 1986 (2) Trusthouse Forte Ladies' Classic, Kristianstad Ladies Open
- 1987 (2) James Capel Guernsey Open, Qualitair Ladies' Spanish Open
- 1988 (2) Bloor Homes Eastleigh Classic, Weetabix Women's British Open
- 1989 (1) Variety Club Celebrity Classic
- 1990 (1) Trophée Internationale Coconut Skol
- 1991 (3) BMW European Masters, Spanish Classic, BMW Italian Ladies' Open
- 1993 (1) Holiday Inn Leiden Ladies' Open
- 1994 (1) BMW Italian Ladies' Open

=== ALPG Tour wins (3) ===
- 1990 FAI Kooralbyn Valley Classic, Coca-Cola Classic
- 1993 Coca-Cola Ladies Pro-Am

=== Ladies Asia Golf Circuit wins (4) ===
- 1990 Thailand Ladies Open
- 1995 Malaysia Ladies Open
- 1996 Indonesia Ladies Open, Malaysia Ladies Open

== Team appearances ==
Amateur

- Commonwealth Trophy (representing Australia): 1983 (winners)
- Tasman Cup (representing Australia): 1981 (winners), 1983 (winners)
- Queen Sirikit Cup (representing Australia): 1983 (winners), 1984

== See also ==
- List of golfers with most Ladies European Tour wins
