= 1979 LPGA Tour =

Golf tour season

1979 LPGA Tour season
- Duration: February 15, 1979 – November 3, 1979
- Number of official events: 35
- Most wins: 8 (United States) Nancy Lopez
- Money leader: (United States) Nancy Lopez
- Player of the Year: (United States) Nancy Lopez
- Vare Trophy: (United States) Nancy Lopez
- Rookie of the Year: (United States) Beth Daniel

The 1979 LPGA Tour was the 30th season since the LPGA Tour officially began in 1950. The season ran from February 15 to November 3 and consisted of 35 official money events. Nancy Lopez won the most tournaments, eight, and led the money list with earnings of $197,489.

There were five first-time winners in 1979: Jerilyn Britz, Beth Daniel, Vicki Fergon, Pat Meyers, and Penny Pulz. This was the first year that the Peter Jackson Classic (now called the Canadian Women's Open) was classified as an LPGA major.

Hall of famer Judy Rankin gained her 26th victory in August, which was her final tour win.

The Women's Kemper Open saw the first ever five-way playoff in LPGA Tour history. It was won by JoAnne Carner. Later in the year, The Coca-Cola Classic, was also decided in a five-way playoff.

The tournament results and award winners are listed below.

== Tournament results ==
The following table shows all the official money events for the 1979 season. "Date" is the ending date of the tournament. The numbers in parentheses after the winners' names are the number of wins they had on the tour up to and including that event. Majors are shown in bold.

Date	Tournament	Location	Winner	Score	Purse ($)	Winner's share ($)
Feb 18	Elizabeth Arden Classic	Florida	(United States) Amy Alcott (6)	285 (−3)	100,000	15,000
Feb 25	Orange Blossom Classic	Florida	(United States) Jane Blalock (21)	205 (−11)	75,000	11,250
Mar 4	Bent Tree Classic	Florida	(South Africa) Sally Little (3)	278 (−10)	100,000	15,000
Mar 11	Sunstar Classic	California	(United States) Nancy Lopez (10)	280 (−8)	100,000	15,000
Mar 18	Honda Civic Classic	California	(United States) JoAnne Carner (23)	281 (−7)	150,000	22,500
Mar 25	Sahara National Pro-Am	Nevada	(United States) Nancy Lopez (11)	274 (−12)	100,000	15,000
Apr 1	Women's Kemper Open	California	(United States) JoAnne Carner (24)	286 (+2)	150,000	22,500
Apr 8	Colgate-Dinah Shore Winner's Circle	California	(Canada) Sandra Post (4)	276 (−12)	250,000	37,500
Apr 22	Florida Lady Citrus	Florida	(United States) Jane Blalock (22)	286 (−6)	100,000	15,000
Apr 29	Otey Crisman Classic	Alabama	(United States) Jane Blalock (23)	205 (−11)	100,000	15,000
May 6	Women's International	South Carolina	(United States) Nancy Lopez (12)	282 (−6)	80,000	12,000
May 13	Lady Michelob	Georgia	(Canada) Sandra Post (5)	210 (−6)	100,000	15,000
May 20	Coca-Cola Classic	New Jersey	(United States) Nancy Lopez (13)	216 (−3)	100,000	15,000
May 27	Corning Classic	New York	(Australia) Penny Pulz (1)	284 (+4)	100,000	15,000
Jun 3	Golden Lights Championship	New York	(United States) Nancy Lopez (14)	280 (−8)	100,000	15,000
Jun 10	**LPGA Championship**	Ohio	(United States) **Donna Caponi (14)**	279 (−9)	150,000	22,500
Jun 17	The Sarah Coventry	New York	(United States) Jane Blalock (24)	280 (−12)	100,000	15,000
Jun 24	Lady Keystone Open	Pennsylvania	(United States) Nancy Lopez (15)	212 (−4)	100,000	15,000
Jul 1	Lady Stroh's Open	Michigan	(United States) Vicki Fergon (1)	284 (−4)	150,000	22,500
Jul 8	Mayflower Classic	Indiana	(United States) Hollis Stacy (6)	213 (−3)	100,000	15,000
Jul 15	**U.S. Women's Open**	Connecticut	(United States) **Jerilyn Britz (1)**	284 (E)	125,000	19,000
Jul 22	Greater Baltimore Classic	Maryland	(United States) Pat Meyers (1)	210 (−9)	75,000	11,250
Jul 29	**Peter Jackson Classic**	Canada	(United States) **Amy Alcott (7)**	285 (−7)	150,000	22,500
Aug 5	Colgate European Open	England	(United States) Nancy Lopez (16)	282 (−14)	110,000	15,000
Aug 13	WUI Classic	New York	(United States) Judy Rankin (26)	288 (−4)	100,000	15,000
Aug 19	Barth Classic	Indiana	(South Africa) Sally Little (4)	208 (-8)	100,000	15,000
Aug 26	Patty Berg Classic	Minnesota	(United States) Beth Daniel (1)	208 (−11)	100,000	15,000
Sep 3	Rail Charity Classic	Illinois	(United States) Jo Ann Washam (3)	275 (−13)	100,000	15,000
Sep 9	Columbia Savings Classic	Colorado	(South Africa) Sally Little (5)	209 (−7)	100,000	15,000
Sep 23	ERA Real Estate Classic	Kansas	(Canada) Sandra Post (6)	284 (−8)	100,000	15,000
Sep 30	Mary Kay Classic	Texas	(United States) Nancy Lopez (17)	274 (−14)	130,000	19,500
Oct 7	Wheeling Classic	West Virginia	(United States) Debbie Massey (2)	219 (+3)	100,000	15,000
Oct 14	United Virginia Bank Classic	Virginia	(United States) Amy Alcott (8)	286 (−2)	100,000	15,000
Oct 29	Colgate Far East Open	Philippines	(Argentina) Silvia Bertolaccini (3)	213 (−6)	110,000	16,500
Nov 3	Mizuno Japan Classic	Japan	(United States) Amy Alcott (9)	211 (−11)	125,000	18,750

== Awards ==
Award	Winner	Country
Money winner	Nancy Lopez (2)	United States
Scoring leader (Vare Trophy)	Nancy Lopez (2)	United States
Player of the Year	Nancy Lopez (2)	United States
Rookie of the Year	Beth Daniel	United States
