= 1978 LPGA Tour =

Golf tour season

1978 LPGA Tour season
- Duration: February 10, 1978 – November 12, 1978
- Number of official events: 34
- Most wins: 9 (United States) Nancy Lopez
- Money leader: (United States) Nancy Lopez
- Player of the Year: (United States) Nancy Lopez
- Vare Trophy: (United States) Nancy Lopez
- Rookie of the Year: (United States) Nancy Lopez

The 1978 LPGA Tour was the 29th season since the LPGA Tour officially began in 1950. The season ran from February 10 to November 12. The season consisted of 34 official money events. Nancy Lopez won the most tournaments, nine. She also led the money list with earnings of $189,814.

There were four first-time winners in 1978: Janet Coles, Shelley Hamlin, Nancy Lopez, and Michiko Okada. Lopez was the first (and as of 2011, only) player to be named LPGA Rookie of the Year and LPGA Player of the Year in the same year. She won 48 LPGA events in her career.

The tournament results and award winners are listed below.

== Tournament results ==
The following table shows all the official money events for the 1978 season. "Date" is the ending date of the tournament. The numbers in parentheses after the winners' names are the number of wins they had on the tour up to and including that event. Majors are shown in bold.

Date	Tournament	Location	Winner	Score	Purse ($)	1st prize ($)
Feb 12	American Cancer Society Classic	Florida	(United States) Debbie Austin (6)	212 (−4)	50,000	7,500
Feb 20	Orange Blossom Classic	Florida	(United States) Jane Blalock (17)	212 (−4)	60,000	9,000
Feb 26	Bent Tree Classic	Florida	(United States) Nancy Lopez (1)	289 (−1)	100,000	15,000
Mar 12	Sunstar Classic	California	(United States) Nancy Lopez (2)	285 (−3)	100,000	15,000
Mar 19	Kathryn Crosby/Honda Civic Classic	California	(South Africa) Sally Little (2)	282 (−6)	150,000	22,500
Apr 2	Colgate-Dinah Shore Winner's Circle	California	(Canada) Sandra Post (2)	283 (−5)	240,000	36,000
Apr 16	Birmingham Classic	Alabama	(United States) Hollis Stacy (4)	207 (−9)	60,000	9,000
Apr 23	American Defender Classic	North Carolina	(United States) Amy Alcott (5)	206 (−10)	55,000	8,250
Apr 30	Natural Light Lady Tara Classic	Georgia	(United States) Janet Coles (1)	211 (−8)	75,000	11,250
May 8	Women's International	South Carolina	(Australia) Jan Stephenson (3)	283 (−5)	80,000	12,000
May 14	Greater Baltimore Classic	Maryland	(United States) Nancy Lopez (3)	212 (−7)	65,000	9,750
May 21	Coca-Cola Classic	New Jersey	(United States) Nancy Lopez (4)	210 (−3)	100,000	15,000
May 29	Golden Lights Championship	New York	(United States) Nancy Lopez (5)	277 (−11)	100,000	15,000
Jun 4	Peter Jackson Classic	Canada	(United States) JoAnne Carner (21)	278 (−14)	100,000	15,000
Jun 11	**LPGA Championship**	Ohio	(United States) **Nancy Lopez (6)**	275 (−13)	150,000	22,500
Jun 18	Bankers Trust Classic	New York	(United States) Nancy Lopez (7)	214 (−5)	75,000	11,250
Jun 25	Lady Keystone Open	Pennsylvania	(United States) Pat Bradley (3)	206 (−10)	50,000	7,500
Jul 3	Mayflower Classic	Indiana	(United States) Jane Blalock (18)	209 (−7)	75,000	11,250
Jul 9	Wheeling Classic	West Virginia	(United States) Jane Blalock (19)	207 (−9)	75,000	11,250
Jul 16	Borden Classic	Ohio	(United States) JoAnne Carner (22)	209 (−7)	85,000	12,750
Jul 23	**U.S. Women's Open**	Indiana	(United States) **Hollis Stacy (5)**	289 (+5)	100,000	15,000
Jul 30	Hoosier Classic	Indiana	(United States) Pat Bradley (4)	206 (−10)	60,000	9,000
Aug 6	Colgate European Open	England	(United States) Nancy Lopez (8)	289 (−7)	100,000	15,000
Aug 13	WUI Classic	New York	(United States) Judy Rankin (25)	283 (−9)	100,000	15,000
Aug 20	Lady Stroh's Open	Michigan	(Canada) Sandra Post (3)	286 (−2)	150,000	22,500
Aug 27	Patty Berg Classic	Minnesota	(United States) Shelley Hamlin (1)	208 (−11)	75,000	11,250
Sep 4	Rail Charity Classic	Illinois	(United States) Pat Bradley (5)	276 (−12)	100,000	15,000
Sep 10	National Jewish Hospital Open	Colorado	(United States) Kathy Whitworth (80)	211 (−5)	60,000	9,000
Sep 17	The Sarah Coventry	California	(United States) Donna Caponi (12)	282 (−10)	100,000	15,000
Oct 1	Golden Lights Championship	California	(United States) Jane Blalock (20)	276 (−12)	100,000	15,000
Oct 15	Civitan Open	Texas	(Argentina) Silvia Bertolaccini (2)	213 (−3)	75,000	11,250
Oct 22	Houston Exchange Clubs Classic	Texas	(United States) Donna Caponi (13)	207 (−9)	50,000	7,500
Nov 3	Mizuno-Japan Classic	Japan	(Japan) Michiko Okada (1*)	216 (−6)	125,000	18,750
Nov 12	Colgate Far East Open	Malaysia	(United States) Nancy Lopez (9)	216 (E)	100,000	15,000

* - non-member at time of win

== Awards ==
Award	Winner	Country
Money winner	Nancy Lopez	United States
Scoring leader (Vare Trophy)	Nancy Lopez	United States
Player of the Year	Nancy Lopez	United States
Rookie of the Year	Nancy Lopez	United States
