= 1980 LPGA Tour =

Golf tour season

1980 LPGA Tour season
- Duration: February 1, 1980 – November 9, 1980
- Number of official events: 38
- Most wins: 5 (United States) Donna Caponi, (United States) JoAnne Carner
- Money leader: (United States) Beth Daniel
- Player of the Year: (United States) Beth Daniel
- Vare Trophy: (United States) Amy Alcott
- Rookie of the Year: (United States) Myra Blackwelder

The 1980 LPGA Tour was the 31st season since the LPGA Tour officially began in 1950. The season ran from February 1 to November 9. The season consisted of 38 official money events. Donna Caponi and JoAnne Carner won the most tournaments, five each. Beth Daniel led the money list with earnings of $231,000.

There were five first-time winners in 1980: Barbara Barrow, Dot Germain, Dale Lundquist, Tatsuko Ohsako, and Donna White.

The tournament results and award winners are listed below.

== Tournament results ==
The following table shows all the official money events for the 1980 season. "Date" is the ending date of the tournament. The numbers in parentheses after the winners' names are the number of wins they had on the tour up to and including that event. Majors are shown in bold.

Date	Tournament	Location	Winner	Score	Purse ($)	1st prize ($)
Feb 4	Whirlpool Championship of Deer Creek	Florida	(United States) JoAnne Carner (25)	282 (−10)	100,000	15,000
Feb 10	Elizabeth Arden Classic	Florida	(United States) Jane Blalock (25)	283 (−5)	100,000	15,000
Feb 17	S&H Golf Classic	Florida	(United States) Dot Germain (1)	209 (−7)	100,000	15,000
Feb 24	Bent Tree Ladies Classic	Florida	(United States) JoAnne Carner (26)	280 (−8)	100,000	15,000
Mar 2	Sun City Classic	Arizona	(Australia) Jan Stephenson (4)	275 (−13)	100,000	15,000
Mar 9	Sunstar Classic	California	(United States) JoAnne Carner (27)	207 (−9)	125,000	18,750
Mar 16	Honda Civic Golf Classic	California	(United States) JoAnne Carner (28)	279 (−9)	150,000	22,500
Mar 23	LPGA National Pro-Am	Nevada	(United States) Donna Caponi (15)	286 (−2)	200,000	30,000
Mar 30	Women's Kemper Open	California	(United States) Nancy Lopez (18)	284 (E)	150,000	22,500
Apr 6	Colgate-Dinah Shore Winner's Circle	California	(United States) Donna Caponi (16)	275 (−13)	250,000	37,500
Apr 13	American Defender/WRAL Classic	North Carolina	(United States) Amy Alcott (10)	206 (−10)	100,000	15,000
Apr 20	Florida Lady Citrus	Florida	(United States) Donna White (1)	283 (−9)	100,000	15,000
Apr 27	Birmingham Classic	Alabama	(United States) Barbara Barrow (1)	210 (−6)	100,000	15,000
May 4	CPC Women's International	South Carolina	(United States) Hollis Stacy (7)	279 (−9)	100,000	15,000
May 11	Lady Michelob	Georgia	(United States) Pam Higgins (3)	208 (−11)	100,000	15,000
May 18	Coca-Cola Classic	New Jersey	(United States) Donna White (2)	217 (−2)	125,000	18,750
May 25	Corning Classic	New York	(United States) Donna Caponi (17)	281 (−7)	100,000	15,000
Jun 1	Golden Lights Championship	New York	(United States) Beth Daniel (2)	287 (−1)	125,000	18,750
Jun 8	**LPGA Championship**	Ohio	(South Africa) **Sally Little (6)**	285 (−3)	150,000	22,500
Jun 15	Boston Five Classic	Massachusetts	(United States) Dale Lundquist (1)	276 (−12)	150,000	22,500
Jun 22	Lady Keystone Open	Pennsylvania	(United States) JoAnne Carner (29)	207 (−9)	100,000	15,000
Jun 29	The Sarah Coventry	New York	(United States) Nancy Lopez (19)	283 (−9)	125,000	18,750
Jul 6	Mayflower Classic	Indiana	(United States) Amy Alcott (11)	275 (−13)	150,000	22,500
Jul 13	**U.S. Women's Open**	Tennessee	(United States) **Amy Alcott (12)**	280 (−4)	140,000	20,047
Jul 20	Greater Baltimore Golf Classic	Maryland	(United States) Pat Bradley (6)	206 (−13)	100,000	15,000
Jul 27	WUI Classic	New York	(South Africa) Sally Little (7)	284 (−4)	125,000	18,750
Aug 3	West Virginia LPGA Classic	West Virginia	(Canada) Sandra Post (7)	211 (−5)	100,000	15,000
Aug 10	**Peter Jackson Classic**	Canada	(United States) **Pat Bradley (7)**	277 (−11)	150,000	22,500
Aug 17	Patty Berg Golf Classic	Minnesota	(United States) Beth Daniel (3)	210 (−9)	100,000	15,000
Aug 24	Columbia Savings LPGA Classic	Colorado	(United States) Beth Daniel (4)	276 (−12)	150,000	22,500
Sep 1	Rail Charity Golf Classic	Illinois	(United States) Nancy Lopez (20)	275 (−13)	125,000	18,750
Sep 7	World Series of Women's Golf	Ohio	(United States) Beth Daniel (5)	282 (−6)	150,000	46,500
Sep 7	Barth Classic	Indiana	(United States) Sandra Spuzich (5)	212 (−4)	100,000	15,000
Sep 14	United Virginia Bank Classic	Virginia	(United States) Donna Caponi (18)	277 (−11)	100,000	15,000
Sep 21	ERA Real Estate Classic	Kansas	(United States) Donna Caponi (19)	283 (−9)	100,000	15,000
Sep 28	Mary Kay Classic	Texas	(United States) Jerilyn Britz (2)	139 (−1)^	150,000	22,500
Oct 12	Inamori Golf Classic	California	(United States) Amy Alcott (13)	280 (−12)	150,000	22,500
Nov 9	Mazda Japan Classic	Japan	(Japan) Tatsuko Ohsako (1)	213 (−9)	225,000	26,250

^ - weather-shortened tournament

== Awards ==
Award	Winner	Country
Money winner	Beth Daniel	United States
Scoring leader (Vare Trophy)	Amy Alcott	United States
Player of the Year	Beth Daniel	United States
Rookie of the Year	Myra Blackwelder	United States
