= 1989 LPGA Tour =

Golf tour season

1989 LPGA Tour season
- Duration: January 13, 1989 – November 5, 1989
- Number of official events: 33
- Most wins: 6 (United States) Betsy King
- Money leader: (United States) Betsy King
- Player of the Year: (United States) Betsy King
- Vare Trophy: (United States) Beth Daniel
- Rookie of the Year: (Scotland) Pamela Wright

The 1989 LPGA Tour was the 40th season since the LPGA Tour officially began in 1950. The season ran from January 13 to November 5. The season consisted of 33 official money events. Betsy King won the most tournaments, six. She also led the money list with earnings of $654,132, becoming the first to win over $500,000 in a season.

There were seven first-time winners in 1989: Tina Barrett, Elaine Crosby, Allison Finney, Lori Garbacz, Tammie Green, Robin Hood, and Dottie Mochrie.

The tournament results and award winners are listed below.

== Tournament results ==
The following table shows all the official money events for the 1989 season. "Date" is the ending date of the tournament. The numbers in parentheses after the winners' names are the number of wins they had on the tour up to and including that event. Majors are shown in bold.

Date	Tournament	Location	Winner	Score	Purse ($)	1st prize ($)
Jan 15	The Jamaica Classic	Jamaica	(United States) Betsy King (15)	202 (−11)	500,000	75,000
Jan 29	Oldsmobile LPGA Classic	Florida	(United States) Dottie Mochrie (1)	279 (−9)	300,000	45,000
Feb 18	Orix Hawaiian Ladies Open	Hawaii	(United States) Sherri Turner (3)	205 (−11)	300,000	45,000
Feb 26	Women's Kemper Open	Hawaii	(United States) Betsy King (16)	202 (−7)	400,000	60,000
Mar 19	Circle K LPGA Tucson Open	Arizona	(United States) Lori Garbacz (1)	274 (−14)	300,000	45,000
Mar 26	Standard Register Turquoise Classic	Arizona	(United States) Allison Finney (1)	282 (−6)	400,000	60,000
Apr 2	**Nabisco Dinah Shore**	California	(United States) **Juli Inkster (12)**	279 (−9)	500,000	80,000
Apr 9	Red Robin Kyocera Inamori Classic	California	(United States) Patti Rizzo (4)	277 (−7)	300,000	45,000
Apr 16	AI Star/Centinela Hospital Classic	California	(United States) Pat Bradley (23)	208 (−8)	450,000	67,500
Apr 23	USX Golf Classic	Florida	(United States) Betsy King (17)	275 (−13)	250,000	37,500
Apr 30	Sara Lee Classic	Tennessee	(United States) Kathy Postlewait (4)	203 (−13)	425,000	63,750
May 7	Crestar Classic	Virginia	(United States) Juli Inkster (13)	210 (−6)	300,000	45,000
May 14	Chrysler-Plymouth Classic	New Jersey	(United States) Cindy Rarick (3)	214 (−5)	275,000	41,250
May 21	**Mazda LPGA Championship**	Ohio	(United States) **Nancy Lopez (40)**	274 (−14)	500,000	75,000
May 28	LPGA Corning Classic	New York	(Japan) Ayako Okamoto (15)	272 (−12)	325,000	48,750
Jun 4	Rochester International	New York	(United States) Patty Sheehan (20)	278 (−10)	300,000	45,000
Jun 11	Planters Pat Bradley International	North Carolina	(United States) Robin Hood (1)	16 points	400,000	62,500
Jun 18	Lady Keystone Open	Pennsylvania	(England) Laura Davies (4)	207 (−9)	300,000	45,000
Jun 25	McDonald's Championship	Delaware	(United States) Betsy King (18)	272 (−12)	550,000	82,500
Jul 2	**du Maurier Ltd. Classic**	Canada	(United States) **Tammie Green (1)**	279 (−9)	600,000	90,000
Jul 9	Jamie Farr Toledo Classic	Ohio	(United States) Penny Hammel (2)	206 (−7)	275,000	41,250
Jul 16	**U.S. Women's Open**	Michigan	(United States) **Betsy King (19)**	278 (−6)	450,000	80,000
Jul 23	Boston Five Classic	Massachusetts	(United States) Amy Alcott (28)	272 (−16)	350,000	52,500
Jul 30	Atlantic City Classic	New Jersey	(United States) Nancy Lopez (41)	206 (−4)	225,000	33,750
Aug 6	Greater Washington Open	Maryland	(United States) Beth Daniel (15)	205 (−8)	300,000	45,000
Aug 27	Nestle World Championship	Georgia	(United States) Betsy King (20)	275 (−13)	265,000	83,500
Aug 27	Mitsubishi Motors Ocean State Open	Rhode Island	(United States) Tina Barrett (1)	210 (−6)	150,000	22,500
Sep 4	Rail Charity Golf Classic	Illinois	(United States) Beth Daniel (16)	203 (−13)	250,000	41,250
Sep 10	Cellular One-Ping Golf Championship	Oregon	(United States) Muffin Spencer-Devlin (3)	214 (−2)	300,000	45,000
Sep 17	Safeco Classic	Washington	(United States) Beth Daniel (17)	273 (−15)	300,000	45,000
Sep 24	Nippon Travel-MBS Classic	California	(United States) Nancy Lopez (42)	277 (−11)	300,000	45,000
Oct 1	Konica San Jose Classic	California	(United States) Beth Daniel (18)	205 (−11)	325,000	48,750
Nov 5	Mazda Japan Classic	Japan	(United States) Elaine Crosby (1)	205 (−11)	500,000	75,000

== Awards ==
Award	Winner	Country
Money winner	Betsy King (2)	United States
Scoring leader (Vare Trophy)	Beth Daniel	United States
Player of the Year	Betsy King (2)	United States
Rookie of the Year	Pamela Wright	Scotland
