= Rancho Park Golf Course =

Municipal golf course

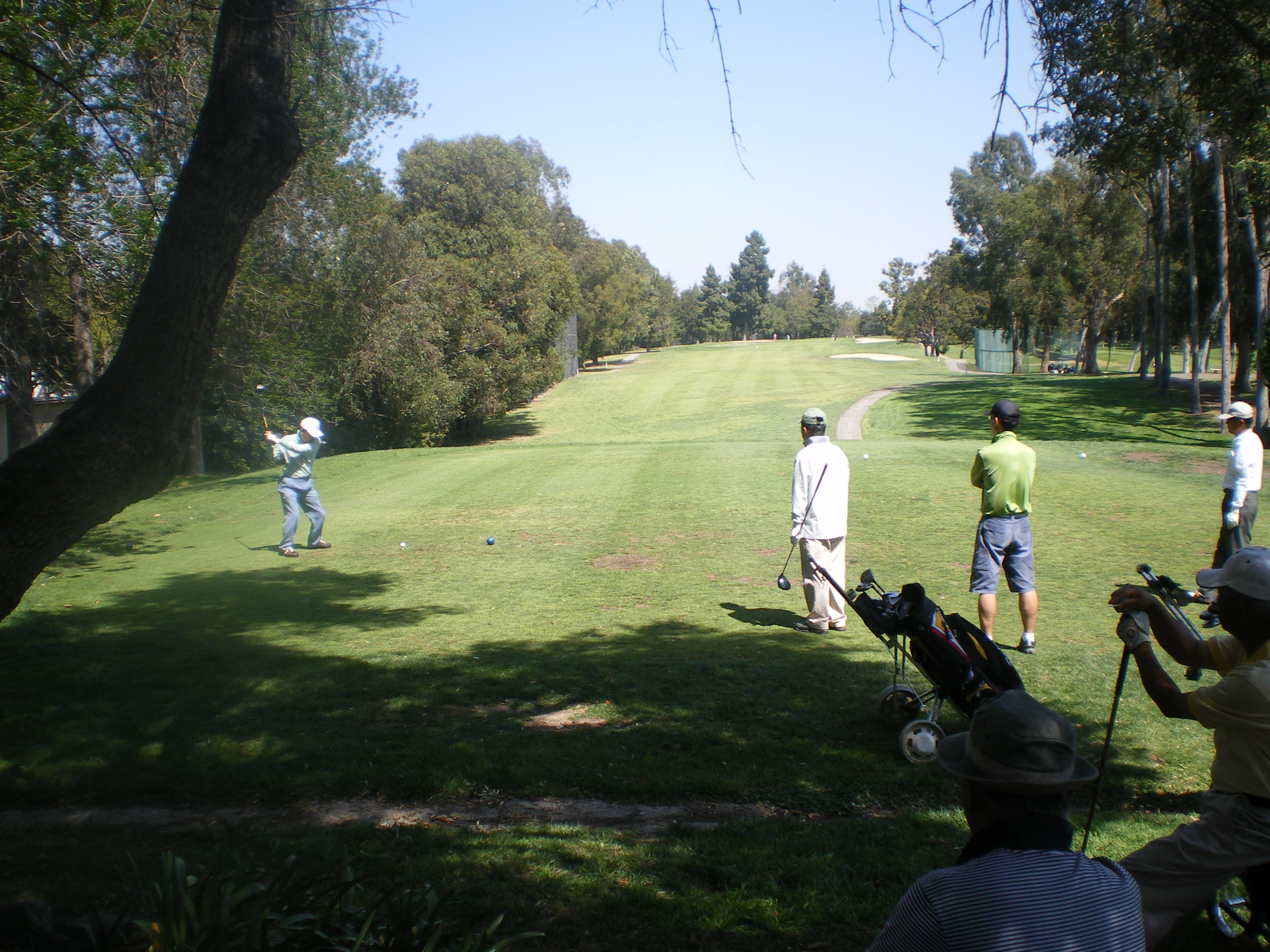
- Rancho Park Golf Course in 2008

- Location within California Location within the United States
- 34.045°N 118.418°W

Club information
- Location: 10460 W. Pico Blvd. Los Angeles, California
- Established: 1947, 79 years ago
- Type: Public
- Owner: City of Los Angeles
- Operator: Department of Recreation & Parks
- Tota holes: 18
- Tournaments: Los Angeles Open (1956–67, 1969–72, 1983); Ralph's Senior Classic (1990–94); Sunstar Classic (LPGA: 1978–80)
- Website: Rancho Park Golf Course
- Designed by: William P. Bell
- Par: 71
- Length: 6,839 yd (6,254 m)
- Course rating: 72.5
- Slope rating: 129
- Course record: 61

Rancho Park Golf Course is a municipal golf course in the western United States, located in southern California in the city of Los Angeles. Owned and operated by the city's Department of Recreation and Parks, the par-71 course in the Cheviot Hills neighborhood was designed by William P. Bell & William H. Johnson in 1947. The fairways are Bermuda Grass and the greens are Bent Grass.

It hosted the Los Angeles Open on the PGA Tour seventeen times, and also was the site of events on the Senior PGA Tour and LPGA Tour.

== History ==
The site was originally a private club named Rancho Country Club. The club ran into some tax problems and the federal government took ownership to satisfy the tax debt and leased it back to the club. Several citizens spearheaded an effort to make the site into a city park. Their efforts were rewarded in 1945 with the creation of Cheviot Hills Park, a 200-acre (0.8 km^{2}) park that included the golf course, tennis courts, and baseball fields. Hillcrest Country Club is adjacent to the northeast, separated by Motor Avenue.

The Los Angeles Open moved to Rancho Park in 1956 and stayed through 1972 (except for 1968) and hosted a final time in 1983. A bronze plaque is located on the 508-yard par-5 ninth hole (currently the 18th hole) along the course's western boundary. It commemorates an incident in the first round of the L.A. Open in 1961; reigning Masters and U.S. Open champion Arnold Palmer carded a twelve after a great tee shot was followed by four consecutive shots out of bounds. The hole narrows near the green, squeezing in between the driving range on the right and Patricia Avenue on the left; he hit the first two to the right, then two left. Five years later, Palmer tied the course record with 62 in the third round to take a seven-shot lead, then held on to win by a stroke, the second of his three victories here (1963, 1966, 1967).

Charlie Sifford was the first African-American to earn a PGA card in 1961; he won the L.A. Open on the course in 1969 on the first playoff hole for his second tour win. It happened on January 12, during the New York Jets' historic upset win in Super Bowl III in Miami.

Jack Nicklaus earned his first tour paycheck at Rancho Park as a 21-year-old rookie in early 1962; he was over twenty strokes back in the $45,000 event and earned less than thirty four dollars. He never won the L.A. Open; his best finish was a solo runner-up in 1978 at Riviera Country Club with an uncharacteristic stumble in the final holes.

Also age 21, Nancy Lopez gained her second career win at Rancho Park in the Sunstar Classic, the second of nine victories for her in 1978. She successfully defended in 1979 with a birdie on the final hole to win by a stroke. The 1980 event was won by JoAnne Carner, shortened to 54 holes after the first round was cancelled by heavy rain.

== Tour events hosted ==
- PGA Tour: Los Angeles Open (17) - 1956–67, 1969–72, and 1983
- Senior PGA Tour: Security Pacific / Ralph's Senior Classic (5) - 1990–94
- LPGA Tour: Sunstar Classic (3) - 1978–80
