= Penny Hammel =

American professional golfer (born 1962)

Personal information
- Nationality: United States
- Born: March 24, 1962 (age 64) Decatur, Illinois, U.S.
- Height: 5 ft 5 in (1.65 m)

Career
- Sport: Golf
- College: University of Miami
- Turned professional: 1984
- Former tour: LPGA Tour (1985–2006)
- Professional wins: 8

Number of wins by tour
- LPGA Tour: 4
- Epson Tour: 4

Best results in LPGA major championships
- Chevron Championship: T8: 1986
- Women's PGA C'ship: T3: 1996
- U.S. Women's Open: T3: 1989
- du Maurier Classic: T4: 1989
- Women's British Open: DNP

Achievements and awards
- Futures Tour Player of the Year: 1984
- LPGA Rookie of the Year: 1985
- Broderick Award: 1983

Penny Hammel (born March 24, 1962) is an American professional golfer who joined the LPGA Tour in 1985.

== Amateur career ==
Hammel was born in Decatur, Illinois. She won several amateur tournaments including the 1979 U.S. Girls' Junior. In the 1979 PGA Junior Championship she finished five strokes ahead of her closest opponent. As a member of the University of Miami women's golf team, Hammel won the 1983 NCAA Women's Golf Championship, and her team won the title in 1984. She was a 1983-84 All-American and a member of the 1984 U.S. Curtis Cup team. In 1983, she won the Broderick Award (now the Honda Sports Award) as the nation's best female collegiate golfer.

== Professional career ==
Hammel turned professional in 1984 and played on the LPGA Futures Tour (now the Epson Tour), winning four times. She was named the Futures Tour Player of the Year.

Hammel joined the LPGA tour in 1985. Her first career title at the Jamie Farr Toledo Classic that year propelled her to be named the 1985 Rolex Rookie of the Year. She eventually went on to win a total of four victories and 40 top-10 finishes on the Tour between 1985 and 2002. Her last LPGA appearance was in 2006.

== Amateur wins ==
- 1979 Junior PGA Championship, Junior Orange Bowl, U.S. Girls' Junior, Illinois Junior
- 1983 NCAA Women's Golf Championship

== Professional wins (4) ==
=== LPGA Tour wins (4) ===
| No. | Date | Tournament | Winning score | Margin of victory | Runner(s)-up |
|---|---|---|---|---|---|
| 1 | Aug 4, 1985 | Jamie Farr Toledo Classic | –10 (72-69-72-65=278) | 1 stroke | (United States) Nancy Lopez |
| 2 | Jul 9, 1989 | Jamie Farr Toledo Classic | –7 (69-66-71=206) | 2 strokes | (United States) Nancy Lopez (Sweden) Liselotte Neumann (United States) Hollis Stacy |
| 3 | Mar 17, 1991 | Desert Inn LPGA International | –5 (71-74-66=211) | 1 stroke | (United States) Beth Daniel |
| 4 | Jun 24, 1997 | Rochester International | –9 (71-70-70-68=279) | 1 stroke | (United States) Nanci Bowen (United States) Tammie Green (United States) Dottie Pepper |

=== Futures Tour wins (4) ===
- 1984 (4) Candlestone Classic, Dave Mason Golf Classic, Tiger Point Classic II, Val Ward Cadillac Classic

== Team appearances ==
Amateur

- Curtis Cup (representing the United States): 1984 (winners)
