= 1985 LPGA Tour =

Golf tour season

1985 LPGA Tour season
- Duration: January 24, 1985 – November 10, 1985
- Number of official events: 35
- Most wins: 5 (United States) Nancy Lopez
- Money leader: (United States) Nancy Lopez
- Player of the Year: (United States) Nancy Lopez
- Vare Trophy: (United States) Nancy Lopez
- Rookie of the Year: (United States) Penny Hammel

The 1985 LPGA Tour was the 36th season since the LPGA Tour officially began in 1950. The season ran from January 24 to November 10. The season consisted of 35 official money events. Nancy Lopez won the most tournaments, five. She also led the money list with earnings of $416,472.

There were five first-time winners in 1985: Kathy Baker, Judy Clark, Penny Hammel, Val Skinner, and Muffin Spencer-Devlin. The season saw the last of JoAnne Carner's 43 LPGA wins and Kathy Whitworth's record 88 LPGA wins.

The tournament results and award winners are listed below.

== Tournament results ==
The following table shows all the official money events for the 1985 season. "Date" is the ending date of the tournament. The numbers in parentheses after the winners' names are the number of wins they had on the tour up to and including that event. Majors are shown in bold.

Date	Tournament	Location	Winner	Score	Purse ($)	1st prize ($)
Jan 27	Mazda Classic of Deer Creek	Florida	(United States) Hollis Stacy (17)	280 (−8)	200,000	30,000
Feb 3	Elizabeth Arden Classic	Florida	(United States) JoAnne Carner (42)	280 (−8)	200,000	30,000
Feb 10	Sarasota Classic	Florida	(United States) Patty Sheehan (13)	278 (−10)	200,000	30,000
Feb 24	Circle K Tucson Open	Arizona	(United States) Amy Alcott (22)	279 (−9)	175,000	26,250
Mar 3	Samaritan Turquoise Classic	Arizona	(United States) Betsy King (4)	280 (−8)	150,000	22,500
Mar 10	Uniden LPGA Invitational	California	(United States) Bonnie Lauer (2)	277 (−11)	330,000	49,500
Mar 17	Women's Kemper Open	Hawaii	(United States) Jane Blalock (26)	287 (−5)	300,000	45,000
Mar 24	GNA Classic	California	(Australia) Jan Stephenson (13)	290 (+2)	250,000	37,500
Apr 7	**Nabisco Dinah Shore**	California	(United States) **Alice Miller (4)**	275 (−13)	400,000	55,000
Apr 14	Kyocera Inamori Classic	California	(United States) Beth Daniel (14)	286 (−2)	175,000	26,250
Apr 21	J&B Scotch Pro-Am	Nevada	(United States) Patty Sheehan (14)	275 (−14)	200,000	30,000
Apr 28	S&H Golf Classic	Florida	(United States) Alice Miller (5)	272 (−16)	175,000	26,250
May 5	Moss Creek Women's Invitational	South Carolina	(United States) Amy Alcott (23)	284 (−4)	200,000	30,000
May 12	United Virginia Bank Classic	Virginia	(United States) Kathy Whitworth (88)	207 (−9)	200,000	30,000
May 19	Chrysler-Plymouth Classic	New Jersey	(United States) Nancy Lopez (30)	210 (−9)	175,000	26,250
May 26	LPGA Corning Classic	New York	(United States) Patti Rizzo (2)	272 (−16)	250,000	37,500
Jun 2	**LPGA Championship**	Ohio	(United States) **Nancy Lopez (31)**	273 (−15)	250,000	37,500
Jun 9	McDonald's Championship	Pennsylvania	(United States) Alice Miller (6)	272 (−16)	400,000	60,000
Jun 16	Rochester International	New York	(United States) Pat Bradley (14)	280 (−8)	255,000	38,250
Jun 23	Mayflower Classic	Indiana	(United States) Alice Miller (7)	280 (−8)	250,000	37,500
Jun 30	Lady Keystone Open	Pennsylvania	(United States) Juli Inkster (4)	209 (−7)	250,000	37,500
Jul 7	Mazda Hall of Fame Championship	Texas	(United States) Nancy Lopez (32)	281 (−7)	300,000	45,000
Jul 14	**U.S. Women's Open**	New Jersey	(United States) **Kathy Baker (1)**	280 (−8)	250,000	41,975
Jul 21	Boston Five Classic	Massachusetts	(United States) Judy Clark (1)	280 (−8)	225,000	33,750
Jul 28	**du Maurier Classic**	Canada	(United States) **Pat Bradley (15)**	278 (−10)	300,000	45,000
Aug 4	Jamie Farr Toledo Classic	Ohio	(United States) Penny Hammel (1)	278 (−10)	175,000	26,250
Aug 11	Henredon Classic	North Carolina	(United States) Nancy Lopez (33)	268 (−20)	210,000	31,500
Aug 18	Nestle World Championship of Women's Golf	Georgia	(United States) Amy Alcott (24)	274 (−14)	200,000	65,000
Aug 18	MasterCard International Pro-Am	New York	(United States) Muffin Spencer-Devlin (1)	209 (−7)	200,000	30,000
Aug 25	LPGA National Pro-Am	Colorado	(United States) Pat Bradley (16)	284 (−4)	300,000	45,000
Sep 2	Rail Charity Classic	Illinois	(United States) Betsy King (5)	205 (−11)	185,000	27,750
Sep 8	Portland Ping Championship	Oregon	(United States) Nancy Lopez (34)	215 (−1)	175,000	26,250
Sep 15	Safeco Classic	Washington	(United States) JoAnne Carner (43)	279 (−9)	200,000	30,000
Sep 22	Konica San Jose Classic	California	(United States) Val Skinner (1)	209 (−7)	250,000	37,500
Nov 10	Mazda Japan Classic	Japan	(United States) Jane Blalock (27)	206 (−10)	300,000	45,000

== Awards ==
Award	Winner	Country
Money winner	Nancy Lopez (3)	United States
Scoring leader (Vare Trophy)	Nancy Lopez (3)	United States
Player of the Year	Nancy Lopez (3)	United States
Rookie of the Year	Penny Hammel	United States
