= 1978 LPGA Championship =

Coordinates: 39.349°N 84.278°W

Tournament information
- Dates: June 8–11, 1978
- Location: Mason, Ohio
- Courses: Jack Nicklaus Golf Center; Grizzly Course
- Tour: LPGA Tour
- Format: Stroke play - 72 holes

Statistics
- Par: 72
- Length: 6,312 yards (5,772 m)
- Cut: 151 (+7)
- Prize fund: $150,000
- Winner's share: $22,500

Champion
- (United States) Nancy Lopez
- 275 (−13)

Location in the United States
Location in Ohio

The 1978 LPGA Championship was the 24th LPGA Championship, held June 8–11 at Jack Nicklaus Golf Center at Kings Island in Mason, Ohio, a suburb northeast of Cincinnati.

Nancy Lopez, a 21-year-old tour rookie, won the first of her three major titles, all at the LPGA Championship at Kings Island. She finished at 275 (−13), six strokes ahead of runner-up Amy Alcott.

It was the sixth tour win for Lopez and her fourth consecutive in 1978, and she won the following week to run the streak to five.

This was the first of twelve consecutive LPGA Championships at Kings Island; the last one in 1989 was also won by Lopez.

== Final leaderboard ==
Sunday, June 11, 1978

| Place | Player | Score | To par | Money ($) |
|---|---|---|---|---|
| 1 | (United States) Nancy Lopez | 71-65-69-70=275 | −13 | 22,500 |
| 2 | (United States) Amy Alcott | 68-68-74-71=281 | −7 | 14,650 |
| 3 | (United States) Judy Rankin | 67-73-71-72=283 | −5 | 10,510 |
| 4 | (United States) JoAnne Carner | 71-72-70-71=284 | −4 | 7,700 |
| 5 | (United States) Jo Ann Washam | 67-69-74-75=285 | −3 | 6,080 |
| T6 | (United States) Donna Caponi Young | 73-72-71-70=286 | −2 | 4,813 |
| T6 | (United States) Susan Lynn Grams | 73-73-71-69=286 | −2 | 4,813 |
| T6 | (South Africa) Sally Little | 73-71-74-68=286 | −2 | 4,813 |
| T9 | (United States) Jane Blalock | 72-73-73-69=287 | −1 | 3,750 |
| T9 | (United States) Dot Germain | 73-69-75-70=287 | −1 | 3,750 |
| T9 | (United States) Hollis Stacy | 69-75-72-71=287 | −1 | 3,750 |
