= 1985 LPGA Championship =

Coordinates: 39.349°N 84.278°W

Tournament information
- Dates: May 30 – June 2, 1985
- Location: Mason, Ohio
- Courses: Jack Nicklaus Golf Center; Grizzly Course
- Tour: LPGA Tour
- Format: Stroke play - 72 holes

Statistics
- Par: 72
- Length: 6,240 yards (5,706 m)
- Cut: 149 (+5)
- Prize fund: $250,000
- Winner's share: $37,500

Champion
- (United States) Nancy Lopez
- 273 (−15)

Location in the United States
Location in Ohio

The 1985 LPGA Championship was held May 30 to June 2 at Jack Nicklaus Golf Center at Kings Island in Mason, Ohio, a suburb northeast of Cincinnati. Played on the Grizzly Course, this was the 31st edition of the LPGA Championship.

Nancy Lopez won the second of her three major titles, all at the LPGA Championship. She led wire-to-wire and finished with a final round 65 (−7) for 273 (−15), eight strokes ahead of runner-up Alice Miller. It was her second consecutive victory of the 1985 season.

Lopez opened with a first round 65, despite being assessed a two-stroke penalty for slow play. She won her third major on the same course in 1989.

== Final leaderboard ==
Sunday, June 2, 1985

Place	Player	Score	To par	Money ($)
1	(United States) Nancy Lopez	65-71-72-65=273	−15	37,500
2	(United States) Alice Miller	71-70-67-73=281	−7	23,125
T3	(United States) Pat Bradley	68-73-69-74=284	−4	15,000
T3	(United States) Lori Garbacz	73-72-68-71=284	−4	15,000
T5	(United States) Allison Finney	73-74-71-68=286	−2	8,917
T5	(Japan) Ayako Okamoto	71-73-72-70=286	−2	8,917
T5	(United States) Cindy Rarick	74-70-71-71=286	−2	8,917
T8	(United States) Amy Alcott	74-71-72-70=287	−1	6,188
T8	(United States) Christa Johnson	73-76-69-69=287	−1	6,188
T10	(United States) Jerilyn Britz	69-76-72-71=288	E	5,012
T10	(United States) Beth Daniel	71-70-74-73=288	E	5,012
