= Sally Little =

South African professional golfer (born 1951)

Personal information
- Nationality: South Africa; United States
- Born: 12 October 1951 (age 75) Cape Town, South Africa
- Height: 5 ft 8 in (1.73 m)

Career
- Sport: Golf
- Turned professional: 1971
- Former tour: LPGA Tour (1971–2005)
- Professional wins: 15

Number of wins by tour
- LPGA Tour: 15

Best results in LPGA major championships (wins: 2)
- Titleholders C'ship: T13: 1972
- Chevron Championship: T5: 1984
- Women's PGA C'ship: Won: 1980
- U.S. Women's Open: T2/2nd: 1978, 1986
- du Maurier Classic: Won: 1988
- Women's British Open: DNP

Achievements and awards
- LPGA Tour Rookie of the Year: 1971
- South African Hall of Fame: 2016

Sally Little (born 12 October 1951) is a South African-born professional golfer. She became a member of the LPGA Tour in 1971 and won 15 LPGA Tour events, including two major championships, during her career. In 2016, she became the first female golfer from South Africa inducted into the South African Hall of Fame.

== Early life and amateur career ==
In 1951, Little was born in Cape Town. As a girl, Gary Player encouraged her to play golf. Little later told The Plain Dealer, "Gary encouraged me when I was 13, but I didn't listen until I was 16. I broke my leg when I was 15 and could only play golf and became interested."

Little was the low individual at the 1970 World Amateur Team Championship and won the South African Match Play and Stroke Play titles that same year. As an amateur, she tied for fifth at the 1971 Lady Carling Open.

== Professional career ==
In 1971, Little joined the LPGA Tour and was named LPGA Rookie of the Year. Her first professional win was at the 1976 Women's International. Little holed a shot from a greenside bunker on the 72nd hole to edge Jan Stephenson by one shot.

Little's best season was 1982, when she finished third on the money list. That year, in August, she also became a United States citizen.

She has won 15 times on the tour, including two major championships, the 1988 du Maurier Classic and the 1980 LPGA Championship.

== Awards and honors ==
- In 1971, Little earned the LPGA Rookie of the Year award.
- In 1989, she earned the Ben Hogan Award from the Golf Writers Association of America
- In 2000, Little was recognized during the LPGA's 50th Anniversary as one of the LPGA's top-50 players and teachers.
- In 2016, she was inducted into the South African Hall of Fame

== Professional wins ==
=== LPGA Tour (15) ===
Legend
LPGA Tour major championships (2)
Other LPGA Tour (13)

No.	Date	Tournament	Winning score	Margin of victory	Runner(s)-up
1	9 May 1976	Women's International	−7 (71-69-71-70=281)	1 stroke	(Australia) Jan Stephenson
2	19 Mar 1978	Kathryn Crosby/Honda Civic Classic	−6 (77-70-70-65=282)	Playoff	(United States) Nancy Lopez
3	4 Mar 1979	Bent Tree Classic	−10 (72-67-72-67=278)	2 strokes	(United States) Nancy Lopez
4	20 Aug 1979	Barth Classic	−8 (68-69-71=208)	1 stroke	(United States) Pat Bradley
5	9 Sep 1979	Columbia Savings Classic	−7 (66-71-72=209)	2 strokes	(United States) Beth Daniel (United States) Judy Rankin
6	8 Jun 1980	LPGA Championship	−3 (69-70-73-73=285)	3 strokes	(United States) Jane Blalock
7	27 Jul 1980	WUI Classic	−4 (69-71-69-75=284)	4 strokes	(United States) Amy Alcott (United States) Beth Daniel
8	8 Feb 1981	Elizabeth Arden Classic	−5 (71-72-72-68=283)	Playoff	(United States) JoAnne Carner (United States) Judy Rankin
9	2 Mar 1981	Olympia Gold Classic	−4 (71-71=142)	1 stroke	(United States) Lori Garbacz (United States) Kathy Whitworth
10	3 May 1981	CPC Women's International	−1 (73-71-73-70=287)	Playoff	(United States) Hollis Stacy (United States) Kathy Whitworth
11	15 Mar 1982	Olympia Gold Classic	−4 (75-74-69-70=288)	2 strokes	(United States) Donna White
12	4 Apr 1982	Nabisco Dinah Shore Invitational	−10 (76-67-71-64=278)	3 strokes	(United States) Sandra Haynie (United States) Hollis Stacy
13	9 May 1982	United Virginia Bank Classic	−11 (72-69-67=208)	Playoff	(United States) Kathy Whitworth
14	18 Jul 1982	Mayflower Classic	−13 (71-66-70-68=275)	5 strokes	(United States) Beth Daniel
15	3 Jul 1988	du Maurier Classic	−9 (74-65-69-71=279)	1 stroke	(England) Laura Davies

Note: Little won the Nabisco Dinah Shore Invitational (now known as the Kraft Nabisco Championship) before it became a major championship.

LPGA Tour playoff record (4–2)

No.	Year	Tournament	Opponent(s)	Result
1	1978	Kathryn Crosby/Honda Civic Classic	(United States) Nancy Lopez	Won with par on first extra hole
2	1981	Elizabeth Arden Classic	(United States) JoAnne Carner (United States) Judy Rankin	Won with par on third extra hole Carner eliminated by par on second hole
3	1981	CPC Women's International	(United States) Hollis Stacy (United States) Kathy Whitworth	Won with birdie on first extra hole
4	1982	Arizona Copper Classic	(Japan) Ayako Okamoto	Lost to birdie on second extra hole
5	1982	United Virginia Bank Classic	(United States) Kathy Whitworth	Won with birdie on first extra hole
6	1986	U.S. Women's Open	(United States) Jane Geddes	Lost 18-hole playoff (Geddes:71, Little:73)

== Major championships ==
=== Wins (2) ===
Year	Championship	Winning score	Margin	Runner-up
1980	LPGA Championship	−3 (69-70-73-73=285)	3 strokes	(United States) Jane Blalock
1988	du Maurier Classic	−9 (74-65-69-71=279)	1 stroke	(England) Laura Davies

== Team appearances ==
Amateur

- Espirito Santo Trophy (representing South Africa): 1970

Professional

- Handa Cup (representing World team): 2007, 2009, 2010, 2011, 2012 (tie)

== See also ==
- List of golfers with most LPGA Tour wins
