= Nancy Lopez =

American professional golfer (born 1957)

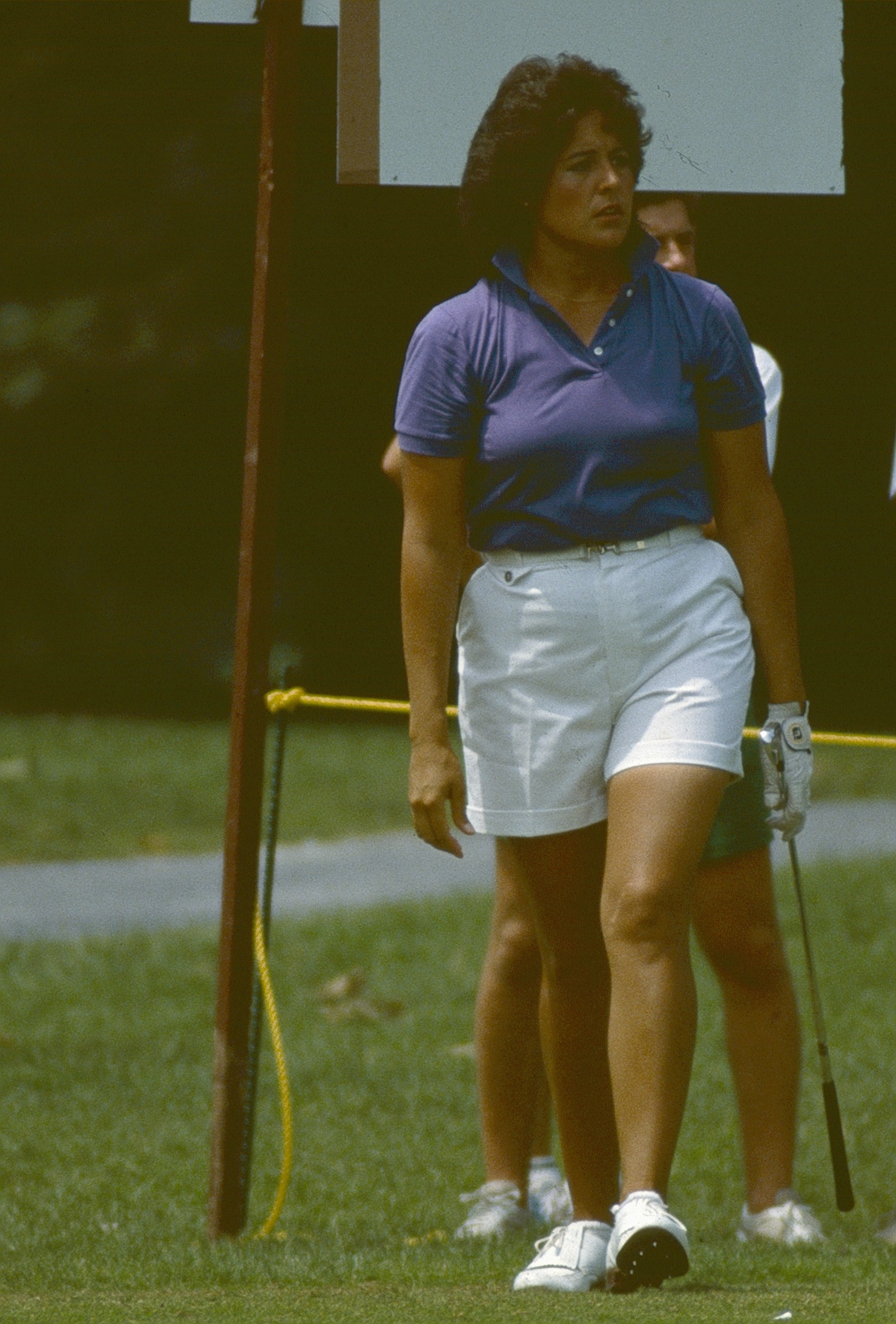

Personal information
- Full name: Nancy Marie Lopez
- Nationality: United States
- Born: January 6, 1957 (age 69) Torrance, California, U.S.
- Height: 5 ft 5 in (165 cm)
- Spouses: Ed Russell (m. 2017); Ray Knight (1982–2009); Tim Melton (1979–1982)
- Children: Ashley, Erinn, Torri

Career
- Sport: Golf
- College: University of Tulsa (two years)
- Turned professional: 1977
- Former tour: LPGA Tour
- Professional wins: 51

Number of wins by tour
- LPGA Tour: 48
- LPGA of Japan Tour: 1
- Other: 3

Best results in LPGA major championships (wins: 3)
- Chevron Championship: T3: 1995
- Women's PGA C'ship: Won: 1978, 1985, 1989
- U.S. Women's Open: 2nd/T2: 1975, 1977, 1989, 1997
- du Maurier Classic: 2nd/T2: 1979, 1981, 1996
- Women's British Open: DNP

Achievements and awards
- World Golf Hall of Fame: 1987 (member page)
- LPGA Tour Rookie of the Year: 1978
- LPGA Tour Money Winner: 1978, 1979, 1985
- LPGA Tour Player of the Year: 1978, 1979, 1985, 1988
- LPGA Tour Vare Trophy: 1978, 1979, 1985
- GWAA Female Player of the Year: 1978, 1979, 1985
- Associated Press Female Athlete of the Year: 1978, 1985
- LPGA William and Mousie Powell Award: 1987
- Flo Hyman Memorial Award: 1992
- USGA Bob Jones Award: 1998
- Old Tom Morris Award: 2000

Nancy Marie Lopez (born January 6, 1957) is an American former professional golfer. She became a member of the LPGA Tour in 1977 and won 48 LPGA Tour events, including three major championships.

== Early life ==
In 1969, at the age of 12, Lopez won the New Mexico Women's Amateur. She later won the U.S. Girls' Junior in 1972 and 1974, at ages 15 and 17, respectively. Shortly after graduation from Goddard High School in Roswell, she played in the U.S. Women's Open as an amateur, first in 1974 and again in 1975, when she tied for second.

== Amateur career ==
In 1976, as a collegiate freshman, Lopez was named All-American and Female Athlete of the Year for her play at the University of Tulsa. That year, she won the Association of Intercollegiate Athletics for Women (AIAW) national intercollegiate golf championship and was a member of the U.S. Curtis Cup and World Amateur teams. Lopez left college after her sophomore year and turned professional in 1977, and again was the runner-up at the U.S. Women's Open.

== Professional career ==
In 1978, during her first full season on the LPGA Tour, she won nine tournaments, including five consecutive. She appeared on the cover of Sports Illustrated in July, won the Vare Trophy for lowest scoring average, and was named LPGA Rookie of the Year, LPGA Player of the Year, and Associated Press Female Athlete of the Year. She won another eight times in 1979, and won multiple times in each year from 1980 to 1984, although she played only half-seasons in 1983 and 1984 due to the birth of her first child.

Playing full-time again in 1985, Lopez posted five wins, five seconds, and five thirds, won the money title, the scoring title, and the Player of the Year Award, and was named Associated Press Female Athlete of the Year for a second time. She entered only four events in 1986, when her second daughter was born, but came back with multiple wins in 1987–89 – three times each in 1988 and 1989 – and once again won Player of the Year honors in 1988. Lopez' schedule was curtailed again in the early 1990s when her third daughter was born. In 1992, she won twice. Lopez continued to play short schedules - from 11 to 18 tournaments - through 2002, then in 2003, she cut back to just a half dozen or fewer events a year.

Lopez was considered to be one of the greats of women's golf and she was the game's best player from the late 1970s to late 1980s. She won three majors, and all were at the LPGA Championship, at the same course, in 1978, 1985, and 1989. Lopez never won the U.S. Women's Open, but finished second four times, the last in 1997, when she became the first in the event's history to score under 70 for all four rounds, yet lost to Alison Nicholas. She won the Colgate-Dinah Shore in 1981, two years before it became a major, and was a runner-up three times at the du Maurier Classic in Canada.

Lopez was inducted into the World Golf Hall of Fame in 1987. She was a member of the United States Solheim Cup team in 1990 and was captain of the team in 2005. Lopez retired from regular tournament play in 2002 and attempted a return in 2007 and 2008. In her return season, she played six tournaments, missed the cut in each, and only broke 80 in three of the 12 rounds. In 2008, she played in three events, with a low score of 76, never making the cut. She was inducted into the Georgia Sports Hall of Fame in 2002.

Lopez is the only woman to win LPGA Rookie of the Year, Player of the Year, and the Vare Trophy in the same season (1978). Her company, Nancy Lopez Golf, makes a full line of women's clubs and accessories. She also does occasional television commentary.

== Personal life ==
Lopez was married to Harrisburg, Pennsylvania sportscaster Tim Melton from 1979 to 1982, whom she met while playing in the Lady Keystone Open in Hershey, Pennsylvania.

Shortly after her divorce, she married Major League All-Star baseball player Ray Knight, then a member of the Houston Astros, in October 1982 in Pelham, Georgia. They were married for 27 years, divorcing in 2009, and have three daughters. While married, Lopez and Knight lived in Georgia in his hometown of Albany. Since 1986, she has hosted the Nancy Lopez Hospice Golf Classic at the Doublegate Country Club to raise money for Albany Community Hospice, returning yearly even after her divorce from Knight in 2009.

She currently resides in The Villages, Florida, where she hosts an annual golf tournament to benefit the charity Adventures in Movement (AIM), an organization that helps mentally challenged, visually impaired, hearing impaired, physically handicapped, and other children and adults with special needs. She has hosted the tournament since 1981 and also serves as a national ambassador with AIM.

In 2017, Lopez married for a third time to Ed Russell.

== Awards and honors ==
- In 1978, during her rookie year, Lopez had an outstanding season and won a number of prestigious awards: the LPGA Rookie of the Year award, the Vare Trophy, the LPGA Player of the Year award, the Associated Press Female Athlete of the Year award, and was the money winner
- In 1979, she again earned a number of prestigious accolades: the Vare Trophy, money list title, and Player of the Year award.
- In 1985, she won a number of prestigious titles once more: she won the LPGA money title, the Vare Trophy, the LPGA Player of the Year award, and was named Associated Press Female Athlete of the Year for a second time.
- In 1987, Lopez was inducted into the World Golf Hall of Fame.
- In 1987, she won the LPGA's William and Mousie Powell Award, bestowed to the player who "whose behavior and deeds best exemplifies the spirit, ideals and values of the LPGA."
- In 1988, she earned the LPGA Player of the Year title for a third time.
- In 1992, earned the Flo Hyman Award, an award given to an inspirational female athlete.
- In 1998, the United States Golf Association (USGA) bestowed upon her the Bob Jones Award, its highest honor.
- In 2000, the Golf Course Superintendents Association of America gave her the Old Tom Morris Award, given to an individual who "through a continuing lifetime commitment to the game of golf has helped to mold the welfare of the game in a manner and style exemplified by Old Tom Morris."
- In 2002, she was inducted into the Georgia Sports Hall of Fame.

== Amateur wins ==
this list may be incomplete

- 1969 New Mexico Women's Amateur
- 1970 New Mexico Women's Amateur
- 1971 New Mexico Women's Amateur
- 1972 U.S. Girls' Junior, Women's Western Junior
- 1973 Women's Western Junior
- 1974 U.S. Girls' Junior, Women's Western Junior
- 1975 Mexican Amateur
- 1976 AIAW National Championship, Women's Western Amateur, Women's Trans National Amateur

== Professional wins (51) ==
=== LPGA Tour wins (48) ===
Legend
LPGA Tour major championships (3)
Other LPGA Tour (45)

No.	Date	Tournament	Winning score	Margin of victory	Runner(s)-up
1	Feb 26, 1978	Bent Tree Classic	+1 (71-72-73-73=289)	1 stroke	(United States) Jo Ann Washam
2	Mar 12, 1978	Sunstar Classic	−3 (72-72-70-71=285)	1 stroke	(United States) Debbie Austin (United States) Debbie Massey
3	May 14, 1978	Greater Baltimore Classic	−7 (67-73-72=212)	3 strokes	(United States) Donna Caponi
4	May 21, 1978	Coca-Cola Classic	−3 (69-71-70=210)	Playoff	(United States) JoAnne Carner
5	May 29, 1978	Golden Lights Championship	−11 (67-72-73-65=277)	1 stroke	(United States) Jane Blalock
6	Jun 11, 1978	LPGA Championship	−13 (71-65-69-70=275)	6 strokes	(United States) Amy Alcott
7	Jun 18, 1978	Bankers Trust Classic	−5 (72-73-69=214)	2 strokes	(United States) Jane Blalock (United States) Debbie Massey
8	Aug 6, 1978	Colgate European Open	−7 (73-71-72-73=289)	3 strokes	(United States) JoAnne Carner (United States) Mary Dwyer (South Africa) Sally Little
9	Nov 12, 1978	Colgate Far East Open	E (75-69-72=216)	2 strokes	(Argentina) Silvia Bertolaccini (United States) Kathy Whitworth
10	Mar 11, 1979	Sunstar Classic	−8 (70-71-70-69=280)	1 stroke	(United States) Hollis Stacy
11	Mar 25, 1979	Sahara National Pro-Am	−16 (72-67-66-69=274)	2 strokes	(United States) Donna Caponi
12	May 6, 1979	Women's International	−6 (72-71-71-68=282)	3 strokes	(United States) Donna White
13	May 20, 1979	Coca-Cola Classic	−3 (73-70-73=216)	Playoff	(United States) Bonnie Bryant (United States) Hollis Stacy (United States) Jo Ann Washam (United States) Mickey Wright
14	Jun 3, 1979	Golden Lights Championship	−8 (67-70-73-70=280)	4 strokes	(United States) Pat Bradley
15	Jun 24, 1979	Lady Keystone Open	−4 (72-68-72=212)	2 strokes	(South Africa) Sally Little (United States) Kathy Whitworth
16	Aug 5, 1979	Colgate European Open	−6 (68-69-70-75=282)	4 strokes	(United States) Joyce Kazmierski
17	Sep 30, 1979	Mary Kay Classic	−14 (71-66-67-70=274)	2 strokes	(Canada) Sandra Post
18	Mar 30, 1980	Women's Kemper Open	E (72-66-77-69=284)	2 strokes	(United States) Debbie Massey (United States) Jo Ann Washam
19	Jun 29, 1980	The Sarah Coventry	−9 (73-67-72-71=283)	1 stroke	(United States) Pat Bradley
20	Sep 1, 1980	Rail Charity Golf Classic	−13 (65-71-71-68=275)	1 stroke	(United States) JoAnne Carner
21	Mar 8, 1981	Arizona Copper Classic	−14 (70-72-68-68=278)	4 strokes	(United States) Pat Bradley
22	Apr 5, 1981	Colgate-Dinah Shore	−11 (71-73-69-64=277)	2 strokes	(United States) Carolyn Hill
23	Jun 28, 1981	The Sarah Coventry	−3 (74-69-71-71=285)	2 strokes	(United States) Pat Bradley
24	Mar 21, 1982	J&B Scotch Pro-Am	−5 (70-67-69-73=279)	5 strokes	(United States) Sandra Haynie
25	Nov 7, 1982	Mazda Japan Classic	−9 (66-70-71=207)	6 strokes	(United States) Amy Alcott
26	Feb 6, 1983	Elizabeth Arden Classic	−3 (71-71-70-73=285)	1 stroke	(United States) Pat Bradley (United States) JoAnne Carner (United States) Stephanie Farwig (United States) Betsy King
27	Apr 10, 1983	J&B Scotch Pro-Am	−6 (71-69-69-74=283)	1 stroke	(United States) Laura Baugh
28	Mar 4, 1984	Uniden LPGA Invitational	E (70-74-66-74=284)	3 strokes	(United States) Pat Bradley
29	Aug 19, 1984	Chevrolet World Championship of Women's Golf	−7 (69-74-65-73=281)	1 stroke	(United States) JoAnne Carner
30	May 19, 1985	Chrysler-Plymouth Classic	−9 (69-69-72=210)	3 strokes	(United States) Pat Bradley
31	Jun 2, 1985	LPGA Championship	−15 (65-71-72-65=273)	8 strokes	(United States) Alice Miller
32	Jul 7, 1985	Mazda Hall of Fame Championship	−7 (71-70-72-68=281)	3 strokes	(United States) JoAnne Carner (United States) Allison Finney
33	Aug 11, 1985	Henredon Classic	−20 (66-67-69-66=268)	10 strokes	(United States) Val Skinner
34	Sep 8, 1985	Portland Ping Championship	−1 (69-76-70=215)	Playoff	(United States) Lori Garbacz
35	Feb 8, 1987	Sarasota Classic	−7 (73-66-68-74=281)	3 strokes	(United States) Kathy Guadagnino (France) Anne Marie Palli
36	Sep 13, 1987	Cellular One-Ping Golf Championship	−6 (72-67-71=210)	1 stroke	(United States) Kelly Leadbetter (United States) Muffin Spencer-Devlin (Australia) Jan Stephenson
37	Feb 7, 1988	Mazda Classic	−5 (69-68-71-75=283)	2 strokes	(Spain) Marta Figueras-Dotti
38	Apr 17, 1988	AI Star/Centinela Hospital Classic	−6 (71-72-67=210)	Playoff	(Spain) Marta Figueras-Dotti
39	May 15, 1988	Chrysler-Plymouth Classic	−12 (68-70-66=204)	8 strokes	(Australia) Jan Stephenson
40	May 21, 1989	Mazda LPGA Championship	−14 (71-69-68-66=274)	3 strokes	(Japan) Ayako Okamoto
41	Jul 30, 1989	Atlantic City Classic	−10 (67-70-69=206)	1 stroke	(United States) Christa Johnson (United States) Vicki Fergon
42	Sep 24, 1989	Nippon Travel-MBS Classic	−11 (73-69-65-70=277)	2 strokes	(United States) Alice Ritzman (Scotland) Pamela Wright
43	Sep 23, 1990	MBS LPGA Classic	−7 (69-70-74-68=281)	Playoff	(United States) Cathy Gerring
44	May 5, 1991	Sara Lee Classic	−10 (65-70-71=206)	2 strokes	(United States) Kris Monaghan
45	Sep 7, 1992	Rail Charity Golf Classic	−17 (67-68-64=199)	Playoff	(England) Laura Davies
46	Sep 13, 1992	Ping-Cellular One LPGA Golf Championship	−7 (70-70-69=209)	Playoff	(Australia) Jane Crafter
47	Jul 11, 1993	Youngstown-Warren LPGA Classic	−13 (68-68-67=203)	Playoff	(United States) Deb Richard
48	Apr 27, 1997	Chick-fil-A Charity Championship	−7 (71-66=137)	2 strokes	(United States) Tina Barrett (United States) Deb Richard (Australia) Karrie Webb

Note: Lopez won the Colgate-Dinah Shore (now known as the Kraft Nabisco Championship) before it became a major championship.

LPGA Tour playoff record (8–7)

No.	Year	Tournament	Opponent(s)	Result
1	1978	Kathryn Crosby/Honda Civic Classic	(South Africa) Sally Little	Lost to par on first extra hole
2	1978	Coca-Cola Classic	(United States) JoAnne Carner	Won with par on first extra hole
3	1978	Mizuno-Japan Classic	(Japan) Michiko Okada (Taiwan) Ai-Yu Tu	Okada won with birdie on fifth extra hole Tu eliminated by birdie on second hole
4	1979	Women's Kemper Open	(United States) Donna Caponi (United States) JoAnne Carner (Japan) Chako Higuchi (Australia) Jan Stephenson	Carner won with par on second extra hole Caponi, Lopez, and Stephenson eliminated by par on first hole
5	1979	Coca-Cola Classic	(United States) Bonnie Bryant (United States) Hollis Stacy (United States) Jo Ann Washam (United States) Mickey Wright	Won with birdie on second extra hole Bryant, Stacy, and Washam eliminated by birdie on first hole
6	1980	Mary Kay Classic	(United States) Jerilyn Britz	Lost to birdie on second extra hole
7	1985	Portland Ping Championship	(United States) Lori Garbacz	Won with birdie on third extra hole
8	1988	AI Star/Centinela Hospital Classic	(Spain) Marta Figueras-Dotti	Won with par on second extra hole
9	1988	Crestar Classic	(United States) Juli Inkster (United States) Rosie Jones (United States) Betsy King	Inkster won with eagle on first extra hole
10	1988	Rochester International	(Taiwan) Mei-Chi Cheng (United States) Patty Sheehan	Cheng won with birdie on second extra hole Sheehan eliminated by par on first hole
11	1990	MBS LPGA Classic	(United States) Cathy Gerring	Won with birdie on first extra hole
12	1992	Rail Charity Classic	(England) Laura Davies	Won with par on first extra hole
13	1992	Ping-Cellular One LPGA Golf Championship	(Australia) Jane Crafter	Won with par on second extra hole
14	1993	Youngstown-Warren LPGA Classic	(United States) Deb Richard	Won with birdie on first extra hole
15	1998	Sara Lee Classic	(United States) Donna Andrews (Peru) Jenny Lidback (United States) Barb Mucha	Mucha won with birdie on second extra hole

=== LPGA of Japan Tour wins (1) ===
- 1982 (1) Mazda Japan Classic^{1}

^{1}Co-sanctioned by the LPGA Tour

=== Other wins (3) ===
- 1979 Portland Ping Team Championship (with Jo Ann Washam)
- 1980 JCPenney Mixed Team Classic (with Curtis Strange)
- 1987 Mazda Champions (with Miller Barber)

== Major championships ==
=== Wins ===
Year	Championship	Winning score	Margin	Runner-up
1978	LPGA Championship	−13 (71-65-69-70=275)	6 strokes	(United States) Amy Alcott
1985	LPGA Championship	−15 (65-71-72-65=273)	8 strokes	(United States) Alice Miller
1989	Mazda LPGA Championship	−14 (71-69-68-66=274)	3 strokes	(Japan) Ayako Okamoto

=== Results timeline ===
Tournament	1974	1975	1976	1977	1978	1979	1980
LPGA Championship					1	T10	T19
U.S. Women's Open	T18	T2LA	CUT	2	T9	T11	T7
du Maurier Classic						2	T6

Tournament	1981	1982	1983	1984	1985	1986	1987	1988	1989	1990
Kraft Nabisco Championship			T6	T16	T11		T33	T5	T18	CUT
LPGA Championship	T5	T35	T21	T14	1		T28	T24	1	T14
U.S. Women's Open	WD	T7		T35	T4		T21	T12	2	T14
du Maurier Classic	T2	T9	WD	T8			T21	T45	9	

Tournament	1991	1992	1993	1994	1995	1996	1997	1998	1999	2000
Kraft Nabisco Championship	T30	CUT	T8	T9	T3	T15	T23	T13	T21	T43
LPGA Championship		T18	T25	WD	T18	T18	T37	T44	WD	T65
U.S. Women's Open		T16	T7	T35	T28	CUT	2	CUT	CUT	T46
du Maurier Classic				T22		T2		T27		

Tournament	2001	2002	2003	2004	2005	2006	2007	2008	2009	2010
Kraft Nabisco Championship	T63	CUT	CUT	WD	CUT					
LPGA Championship	CUT	CUT	CUT	CUT			CUT			CUT
U.S. Women's Open		CUT								
Women's British Open ^										

^ The Women's British Open replaced the du Maurier Classic as an LPGA major in 2001.

Win
Top 10
Did not play

LA = low amateur
CUT = missed the half-way cut
WD = withdrew
"T" = tied

== U.S. national team appearances ==
Amateur

- Curtis Cup: 1976 (winners)
- Espirito Santo Trophy: 1976 (winners)

Professional

- Solheim Cup: 1990 (winners), 2005 (non-playing captain, winners)
- Handa Cup: 2011 (winners), 2012 (tie, Cup retained), 2013

== See also ==
- List of golfers with most LPGA Tour wins
- List of golfers with most LPGA major championship wins

Awards and achievements
Preceded by Diana Golden-Brosnihan	Flo Hyman Memorial Award; 1992	Succeeded by Lynette Woodard
