= Debbie Massey =

American professional golfer (born 1950)

Personal information
- Nationality: United States
- Born: November 5, 1950 (age 75) Grosse Pointe, Michigan, U.S.
- Height: 5 ft 8 in (1.73 m)

Career
- Sport: Golf
- College: University of Denver
- Status: Professional
- Current tour: Legends Tour
- Former tour: LPGA Tour (1977–95)
- Professional wins: 5

Number of wins by tour
- LPGA Tour: 3
- Ladies European Tour: 2

Best results in LPGA major championships
- Chevron Championship: T10: 1988
- Women's PGA C'ship: 3rd: 1983
- U.S. Women's Open: T2: 1979
- du Maurier Classic: 2nd: 1991

Achievements and awards
- LPGA Rookie of the Year: 1977

Debbie Massey (born November 5, 1950) is an American professional golfer.

Before joining the LPGA Tour, Massey worked as a skiing instructor. She was LPGA rookie of the year in 1977.

Massey won three events on the LPGA Tour, not including back-to-back victories in the Women's British Open, which is now one of the LPGA's major championships.

== Amateur wins ==
- 1972 Women's Western Amateur
- 1974 Canadian Women's Amateur
- 1975 Canadian Women's Amateur, South Atlantic Amateur, Eastern Amateur, Women's Western Amateur
- 1976 Canadian Women's Amateur

== Professional wins ==
=== LPGA Tour wins (3) ===
No.	Date	Tournament	Winning score	Margin of victory	Runner(s)-up
1	Nov 3, 1977	Mizuno Japan Classic	−2 (72-73-75=220)	6 strokes	(United States) Hollis Stacy
2	Oct 7, 1979	Wheeling Classic	+3 (75-71-73=219)	Playoff	(United States) Betsy King
3	Nov 4, 1990	Mazda Japan Classic	−11 (69-64=133)	3 strokes	(United States) Danielle Ammaccapane (United States) Caroline Keggi

LPGA Tour playoff record (1–3)

No.	Year	Tournament	Opponent(s)	Result
1	1979	Wheeling Classic	(United States) Betsy King	Won with par on first extra hole
2	1980	Coca-Cola Classic	(United States) Donna White	Lost to par on first extra hole
3	1983	West Virginia LPGA Classic	(United States) Lori Garbacz (United States) Alice Miller	Miller won with birdie on fourth extra hole Massey eliminated by birdie on third hole
4	1986	Lady Keystone Open	(United States) Cindy Hill (United States) Juli Inkster	Inkster won with par on first extra hole

=== Ladies European Tour wins (2) ===
- 1980 Pretty Polly Women's British Open
- 1981 Pretty Polly Women's British Open

== U.S. national team appearances ==
Amateur

- Curtis Cup: 1974 (winners), 1976 (winners)
- Espirito Santo Trophy: 1974 (winners), 1976 (winners)
