= 1984 U.S. Women's Open =

Coordinates: 42.531°N 70.963°W

Tournament information
- Dates: July 12–15, 1984
- Location: Peabody, Massachusetts
- Course: Salem Country Club
- Organized by: USGA
- Tour: LPGA Tour

Statistics
- Par: 72
- Length: 6,285 yards (5,747 m)
- Field: 150 players, 62 after cut
- Cut: 156 (+12)
- Prize fund: $225,000
- Winner's share: $36,000

Champion
- (United States) Hollis Stacy
- 290 (+2)

Location in the United States
Location in Massachusetts

The 1984 U.S. Women's Open was the 39th U.S. Women's Open, held July 12–15 at Salem Country Club in Peabody, Massachusetts. Hollis Stacy won her third U.S. Women's Open, one stroke ahead of runner-up Rosie Jones. It was Stacy's fourth and final major title.

The championship was played here thirty years earlier in 1954, won by Babe Zaharias, her tenth and final major title.

== Round summaries ==
=== First round ===
Thursday, July 12, 1984

=== Second round ===
Friday, July 13, 1984

=== Third round ===
Saturday, July 14, 1984

=== Fourth round ===
Sunday, July 15, 1984

Place	Player	Score	To par	Money ($)
1	(United States) Hollis Stacy	74-72-75-69=290	+2	36,000
2	(United States) Rosie Jones	73-71-75-72=291	+3	19,500
T3	(United States) Amy Alcott	71-74-73-74=292	+4	13,008
T3	(United States) Lori Garbacz	74-76-72-70=292	+4	13,008
T5	(United States) Betsy King	74-72-75-73=294	+6	7,389
T5	(United States) Patty Sheehan	73-77-74-70=294	+6	7,389
T5	(Australia) Penny Pulz	75-69-78-72=294	+6	7,389
T8	(Japan) Ayako Okamoto	72-74-74-75=295	+7	5,510
T8	(United States) Donna White	75-71-72-77=295	+7	5,510
T10	(United States) Beth Daniel	76-76-73-72=297	+9	4,746
T10	(United States) Kathy Whitworth	73-75-75-74=297	+9	4,746
