= Olympia Gold Classic =

Golf tournament formerly on the LPGA Tour

Coordinates: 34.021°N 117.928°W

Tournament information
- Location: Industry, California, U.S.
- Established: 1978 (as Sunstar Classic)
- Courses: Industry Hills Golf Club; Eisenhower Course
- Par: 73
- Length: 6,006 yards (5,492 m)
- Tour: LPGA Tour
- Format: Stroke play - 72 holes
- Prize fund: $150,000
- Month played: March
- Final year: 1982

Tournament record score
- Aggregate: 280 Nancy Lopez (1979)
- To par: −9 JoAnne Carner (1980)

Final champion
- (South Africa) Sally Little

Location in the United States
Location in California
Locations in L.A. metro area

The Olympia Gold Classic was a women's professional golf tournament on the LPGA Tour, held in southern California in Los Angeles County from 1978 to 1982. It was played in late winter at the Rancho Park Golf Course in the city of Los Angeles from 1978 to 1980 as the "Sunstar Classic," then moved east to Industry Hills Golf Club in City of Industry in 1981 and 1982, in a renamed event sponsored by Olympia Brewing Company.

== History ==
Nancy Lopez, age 21, won the inaugural edition by a stroke for her second career win; she won her first at the previous tournament in Florida two weeks earlier and won nine times in 1978, including five consecutive in late spring. Lopez successfully defended the title in 1979, sinking a ten-foot (3 m) birdie putt on the final hole to edge Hollis Stacy by a stroke.

The last three editions were hampered by heavy rains; 1980 was 54 holes as the first round was washed out, and 1981 was reduced to 36 holes with no weekend play. The next year it went the full 72 holes, but the final round was postponed a day to Monday. Sally Little was the champion the last two years.

It was not succeeded by any event in the Los Angeles area in 1983.

== Tournament names ==
- Olympia Gold Classic – (1981–1982), at Industry Hills Golf Club in City of Industry
- Sunstar Classic – (1978–1980), at Rancho Park Golf Course in Los Angeles

== Winners ==
Year	Dates	Champion	Country	Winning score	To par	Margin of victory	Winner's share ($)	Purse ($)	Notes
Olympia Gold Classic
1982	Mar 11–15	Sally Little (2)	South Africa	75-74-69-70=288	−4	2 strokes	22,500	150,000	
1981	Feb 26–27	Sally Little	South Africa	71-71=142	−4	1 stroke	22,500	150,000	
Sunstar Classic
1980	Mar 6–9	Joanne Carner	United States	69-71-67=207	−9	3 strokes	18,750	125,000	
1979	Mar 8–11	Nancy Lopez (2)	United States	70-71-70-69=280	−8	1 stroke	15,000	100,000	
1978	Mar 9–12	Nancy Lopez	United States	72-72-70-71=285	−3	1 stroke	15,000	100,000	

- Due to heavy rain, final round in 1982 was held on Monday; no weekend rounds in 1981, and no opening round in 1980.
