= Lori Garbacz =

American professional golfer (born 1958)

Personal information
- Nationality: United States
- Born: August 11, 1958 (age 68)

Career
- Sport: Golf
- College: University of Florida
- Turned professional: 1979
- Former tour: LPGA Tour
- Professional wins: 1

Number of wins by tour
- LPGA Tour: 1

Best results in LPGA major championships
- Chevron Championship: 5th: 1991
- Women's PGA C'ship: T3: 1985
- U.S. Women's Open: T3: 1984
- du Maurier Classic: T10: 1985

Lori Garbacz (born August 11, 1958) is an American professional golfer who played on the LPGA Tour for sixteen years.

== College career ==
From South Bend, Indiana, Garbacz attended the University of Florida in Gainesville, where she played for coach Mimi Ryan's Florida Gators women's golf team in 1977 and 1978. The 1978 team was the runner-up at the Association for Intercollegiate Athletics for Women (AIAW) national championship tournament. Garbacz was recognized as a first-team All-American in 1978.

== Professional career ==
Garbacz turned professional in 1979, and played on the LPGA Tour until 1995. After taking much of the 1988 season off, her only win on the tour came the next year in 1989 at the Circle K LPGA Tucson Open. In major championships, she finished in third place twice: at the 1984 U.S. Women's Open and at the 1985 LPGA Championship.

Garbacz gained a measure of notoriety at the U.S. Women's Open in 1991 when she protested the slow play at the event, primarily due to inexperienced qualifiers. She asked her caddy to call Domino's Pizza from a payphone near the 14th hole and had a pizza delivered to the 17th tee, which she shared with her group and the one ahead, which was still waiting to play. Rounds took well over five hours.

Her career winnings as a professional golfer totaled $911,483.

== Professional wins ==
=== LPGA Tour wins (1) ===
No.	Date	Tournament	Winning score	Margin of victory	Runner-up
1	Mar 19, 1989	Circle K LPGA Tucson Open	–11 (69-68-67-70=274)	4 strokes	(United States) Nancy Lopez

LPGA Tour playoff record (0–2)

No.	Year	Tournament	Opponent(s)	Result
1	1983	West Virginia LPGA Classic	(United States) Debbie Massey (United States) Alice Miller	Miller won with birdie on fourth extra hole Massey eliminated by birdie on third hole
2	1985	Portland Ping Championship	(United States) Nancy Lopez	Lost to birdie on third extra hole

== See also ==
- List of Florida Gators women's golfers on the LPGA Tour
- List of University of Florida alumni
