= Robin Hood (golfer) =

American professional golfer (born 1964)

Personal information
- Nationality: United States
- Born: September 26, 1964 (age 62) Mishawaka, Indiana, U.S.

Career
- Sport: Golf
- College: Oklahoma State University
- Status: Professional
- Former tour: LPGA Tour (1988–1997)
- Professional wins: 1

Number of wins by tour
- LPGA Tour: 1

Best results in LPGA major championships
- Chevron Championship: T54: 1997
- Women's PGA C'ship: T34: 1996
- U.S. Women's Open: T24: 1988
- du Maurier Classic: T30: 1993

Robin Hood (born September 26, 1964) is an American professional golfer who played on the LPGA Tour.

Hood was born in Mishawaka, Indiana. She played college golf at Oklahoma State University where she was a three-time All-American (1984, 1986, 1987).

Hood won once on the LPGA Tour in 1989.

== Amateur wins ==
- 1983 Indiana Women's State Amateur
- 1983 Big Eight Championships
- 1983 Suncoast Collegiate Invitational
- 1984 Indiana Women's State Amateur
- 1984 Big Eight Conference Championship
- 1984 Susie Maxwell Berning Classic
- 1986 Big Eight Conference Championship
- 1986 Indiana Women's State Amateur
- 1987 Betsy Rawls Invitational
- 1987 SMU Lady Mustang Invitational

== Professional wins (1) ==
=== LPGA Tour wins (1) ===
No.	Date	Tournament	Winning score	Margin of victory	Runners-up
4	Jun 11, 1989	Planters Pat Bradley International	16 points	5 points	(United States) Kathy Postlewait (United States) Patti Rizzo
