= Cheviot Hills, Los Angeles =

Cheviot Hills
- Neighborhood of Los Angeles
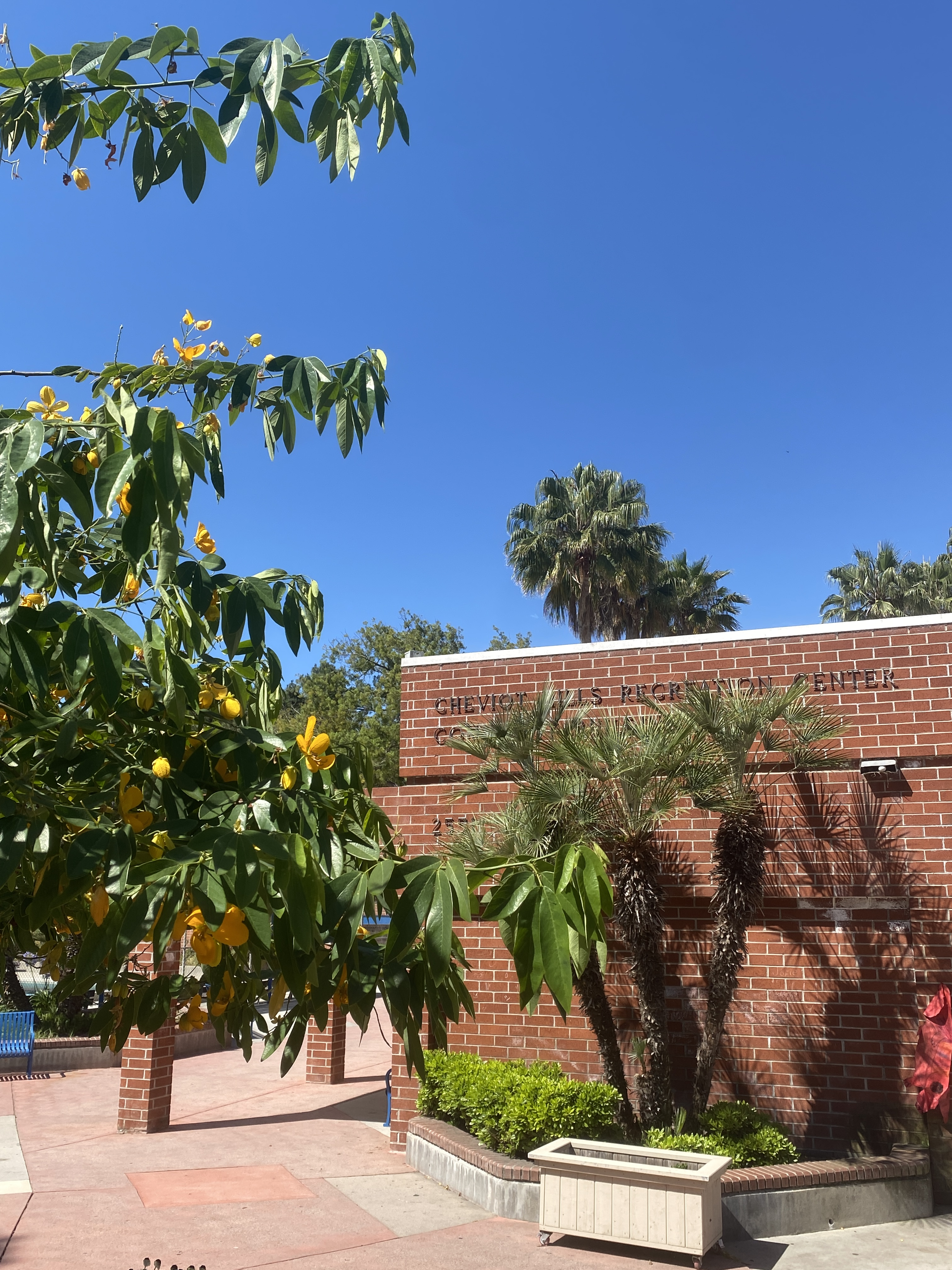

- Location within Westside
- Coordinates: 34.039662°N 118.406729°W
- Country: United States
- State: California
- County: Los Angeles
- City: Los Angeles
- Time zone: Pacific
- Zip Code: 90064
- Area code: 310
- Website: cheviothills.org

Cheviot Hills is a neighborhood on the Westside of the city of Los Angeles, California.

Founded in 1924, the neighborhood has served as the filming location of movies and television shows due to its convenient location between MGM Studios (now Sony Pictures Studios) and Fox Studios. The neighborhood has also long been home to many actors, recording artists, and television and studio executives.

== History ==
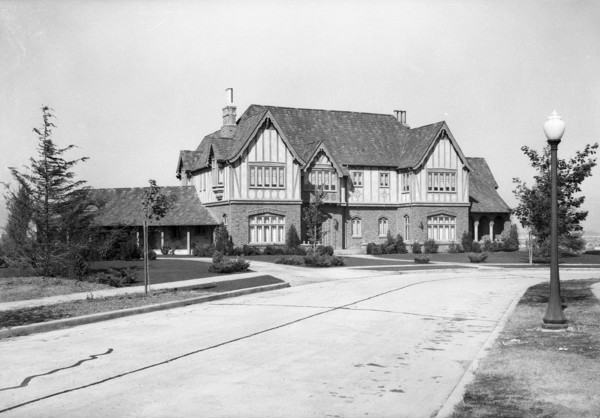
Cheviot Hills in 1928. This house was designed by Eugene R. Ward and was named "Terrace View" by the builder. It was home to Agnes Moorehead in the 1940s and 1950s. (Modern day photo featured earlier in this article)

Almost all of today's Cheviot Hills was within the Spanish land grant known as Rancho Rincon de los Bueyes. Largely undeveloped until the 1920s, initial construction in the residential section west of Motor Avenue dates to the 1920s. From the 1920s to 1953, the streetcar line known as the Santa Monica Air Line of the Pacific Electric system ran along the southern edge of Cheviot Hills and provided passenger service between Cheviot Hills, downtown Los Angeles, and downtown Santa Monica. Much of the neighborhood east of Motor Avenue and south of Forrester Drive was built on the site of the former California Country Club, and the residences date to the early 1950s. The neighborhood features several homes by prominent architects, such as the Strauss-Lewis House by Raphael Soriano and the Harry Culver Estate, designed by Wallace Neff.

The neighborhood was originally middle class, with 1926 prices for homes starting at $50,000, or around $909,000 in 2025. However, prices have increased dramatically in recent years and now rival those of neighboring Beverly Hills, Bel Air, and Holmby Hills, resulting in a surge of new development at the cost of many of the neighborhood's original 1920s homes. Consequently, Cheviot Hills was named Redfin's "hottest" neighborhood in the country for real estate for 2014, and the "hottest" neighborhood in Los Angeles for 2015. In 2015 CityLab named Cheviot Hills as the 24th most expensive neighborhood in the United States to rent in.

=== Monte Mar Vista ===
Developed between 1926 and 1940, Monte Mar Vista is the most affluent part of Cheviot Hills. The neighborhood was originally developed by W.R. McConnell, Fred W. Forrester, and John P. Haynes and consists of sixteen blocks along the northern side of Cheviot Hills bound by the Hillcrest Country Club, Cheviot Hills Park, and Rancho Park Golf Course to the north, west, and east and Lorenzo, Forrester, and Club Drive to the south. In 1928, the development was taken over by Ole Hanson and the Frank Meline Company, who continued to develop the neighborhood. Because of the area's location, many properties enjoy expansive views that overlook the Hillcrest Country Club and Rancho Park Golf Course as well as views of Century City, the Hollywood Hills, and the Hollywood Sign. Many of the lots are large, often covering several parcels, and homes were designed by prominent architects including John L. DeLario, Roland E. Coartes, Wallace Neff, and Eugene R. Ward. The first house designed by Craig Ellwood, Lappin House, is located in this part of Cheviot Hills.

=== California Country Club Estates ===
Built in 1952 on the site of the former California Country Club, California Country Club Estates is a neighborhood of single-family homes that is known locally as New Cheviot, as opposed to the rest of Cheviot Hills which is known as Old Cheviot. The neighborhood is located within Cheviot Hills, bound to the north by Club Drive and to the west by Queensbury Drive, but has a separate home owner's association with binding CC&Rs attached to each lot, and its borders are marked by signs and central medians. The neighborhood was originally developed by Sanford Adler, the owner of the Flamingo Las Vegas and El Rancho Hotel and Casino, and included homes built by architects such as A. Quincy Jones.

=== Filming locations ===
Situated within a short drive of both Fox Studios and Sony Pictures Studios, the neighborhood has often been the site for the filming of motion pictures and television shows.

Examples dating to the 1920s and 1930s include the Laurel and Hardy films The Finishing Touch, Big Business, and Bacon Grabbers, among others. Later examples include The Ropers television series from the late 1970s and the movie Private School in 1983.

=== Publishing locations ===
In 1968, John Martin moved his two-year old publishing company Black Sparrow Press into a small cottage behind a friend’s house on Kilrenney Avenue in Cheviot Hills. From those modest accommodations, Martin published some of Black Sparrow’s most well-known titles, including early Charles Bukowski books such as the poetry collection The Days Run Away Like Wild Horses Over the Hills and the author’s debut novel, Post Office.

== Geography ==
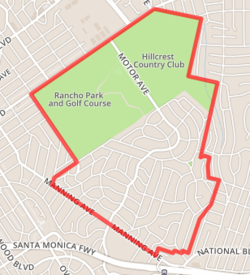
Map showing the boundaries of Cheviot Hills

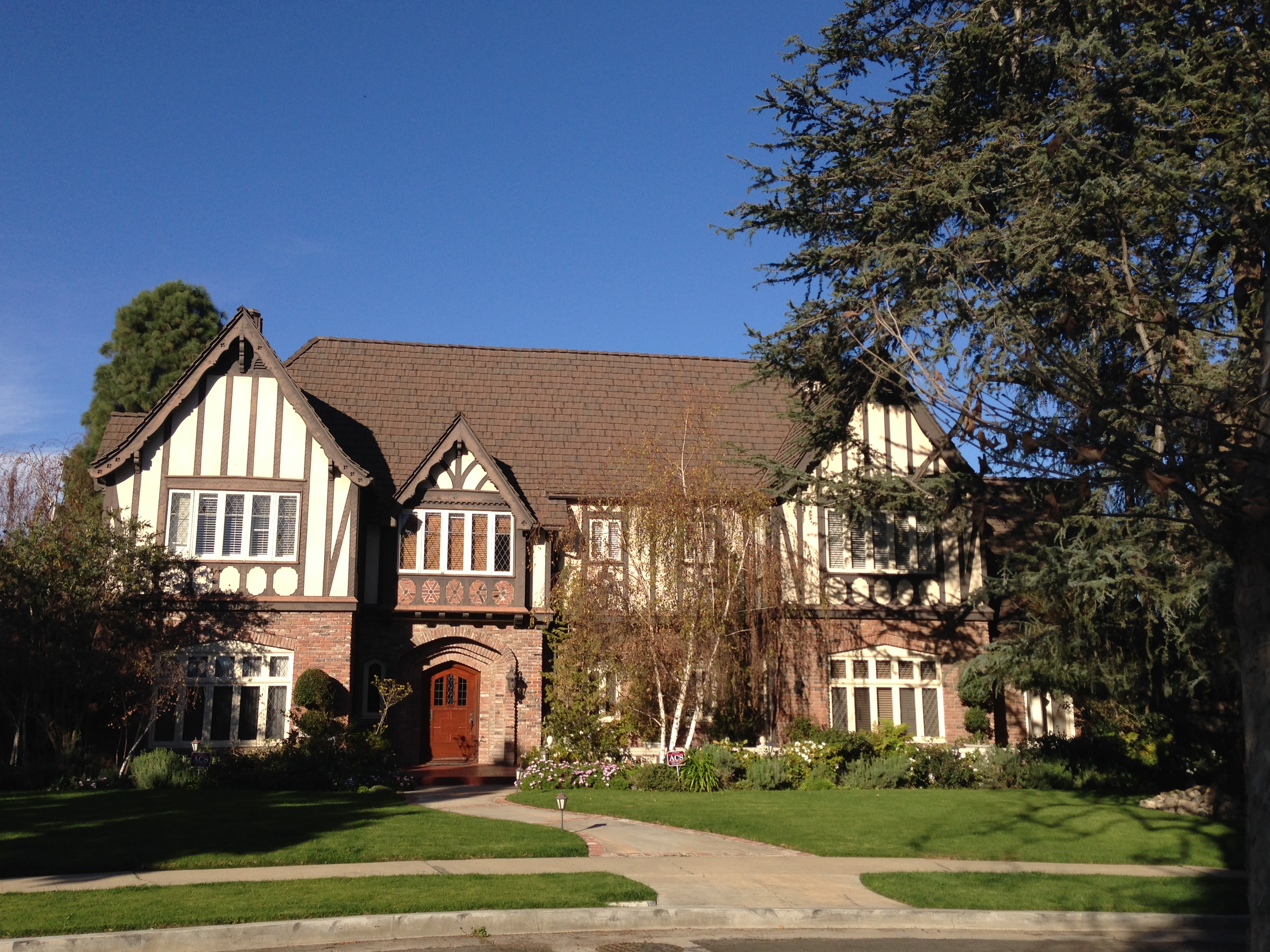
"Terrace View", former residence of actress Agnes Moorehead, as example of typical house in Cheviot Hills

According to The New York Times, Cheviot Hills is bounded by the northern limits of the Rancho Park Golf Course and the Hillcrest Country Club to the north, Patricia Avenue and Manning Avenue to the west and southwest, and Beverwil Drive and Castle Heights Avenue to the east and southeast.

In the Mapping L.A. project of the Los Angeles Times, Cheviot Hills' street and other borders are Rancho Park Golf Course and Hillcrest Country Club to the northwest; Anchor Avenue and Club Drive to the east; and Manning Avenue to the southwest. Using these boundaries, Cheviot Hills is flanked on the north by West Los Angeles and Century City, on the east by Beverlywood and Castle Heights, on the south by Palms, and on the west by Rancho Park.

The Mapping L.A. boundaries are broader than those recognized by the Cheviot Hills Homeowners' Association (CHHOA). Although the CHHOA covers areas beyond the original Cheviot Hills tract, such as Monte-Mar Vista and most of Tract 13945, Mapping L.A.'s boundaries also include all or parts other neighborhoods, such as Castle Heights and California Country Club Estates, which have their own homeowners' associations.

== Demographics ==
The 2000 U.S. census counted 6,945 residents in the 1.54-square-mile Cheviot Hills neighborhood—an average of 4,520 people per square mile, among the lowest densities for the city; The acreage include the open areas of the Cheviot Hills Park, the Rancho Park Golf Course and Hillcrest Country Club. Cheviot Hills Park is home to a recreation center, many basketball courts, and a baseball league. It also includes an archery range. In 2008, the city estimated that the population had increased to 7,303. The median age for residents was 42, older than the city at large; the percentages of residents aged 50 to 64 were among the county's highest.

The neighborhood was considered "not especially diverse" ethnically, with a high percentage of white people in comparison to the rest of Los Angeles. The population was 78.8% Non-Hispanic White, 9.1% Asian, 8.3% Hispanic or Latino, 1.3% Black, and 2.5% from other groups. Japan (8.8%) and Mexico (7.7%) were the most common places of birth for the 20.8% of the residents who were born abroad—considered a low figure for Los Angeles.

The median yearly household income in 2008 dollars was $111,813, a high figure for Los Angeles, and the percentage of households earning $125,000 and up was considered high for the county. The average household size of 2.2 people was low for both the city and the county. Renters occupied 35.7% of the housing stock and house- or apartment owners held 64.3%.

The percentages of veterans who served during World War II or the Korean War were among the county's highest.

== Government and infrastructure ==
The Los Angeles County Department of Health Services SPA 5 West Area Health Office serves Cheviot Hills.

=== Police service ===
The Los Angeles Police Department operates the West Los Angeles Community Police Station at 1663 Butler Avenue, 90025, serving the neighborhood.

=== Education ===
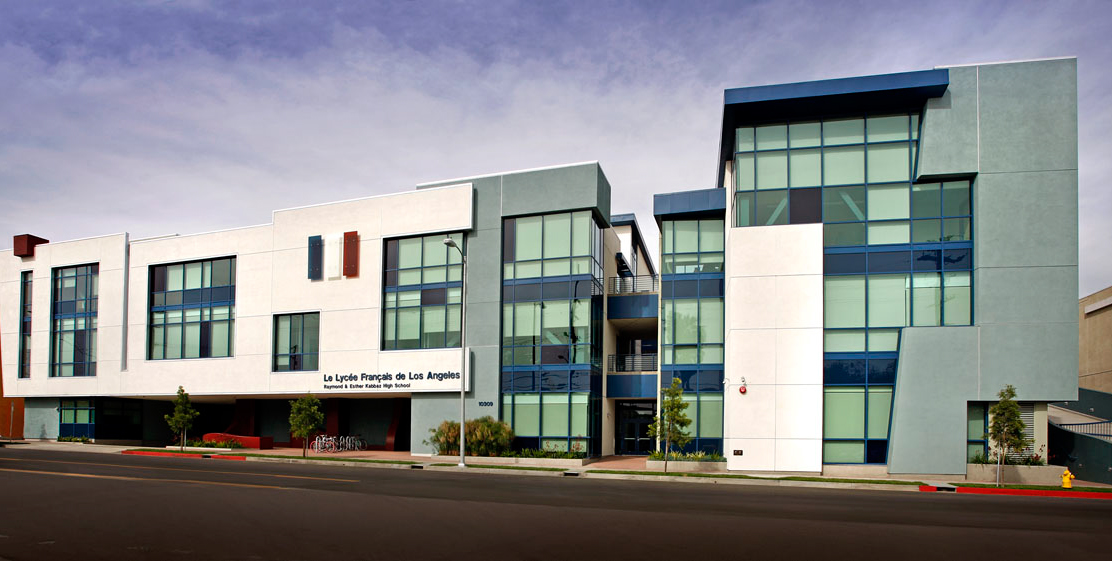
Raymond and Esther Kabbaz High School of Lycée Français de Los Angeles

Sixty percent of Cheviot Hills residents aged 25 and older had earned a four-year degree by 2000, a high figure for both the city and the county. The percentages of residents of that age with a bachelor's degree or a master's degree were also considered high for the county.

The schools near Cheviot Hills are as follows:

- Overland Avenue Elementary School, LAUSD, 10650 Ashby Avenue
- Vista School, private K–12, 3200 Motor Avenue
- Lycée Français de Los Angeles Kabbaz High School

=== Parks and recreation ===
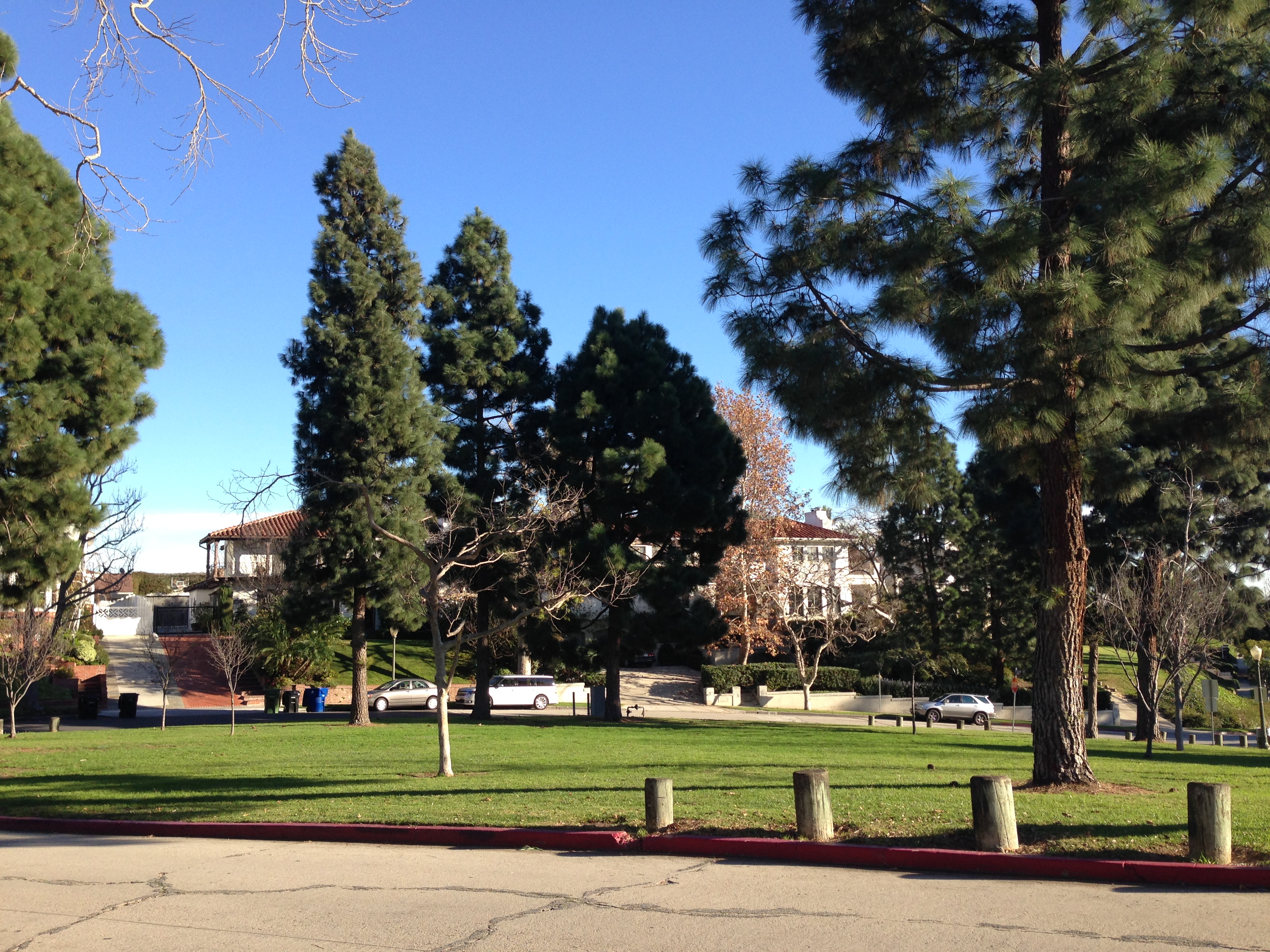
Club Circle Park

Cheviot Hills features the Cheviot Hills Park, the Cheviot Hills Recreation Center, the Cheviot Hills Tennis Courts, and Rancho Park Golf Course. The park and recreation center have a community room which has a capacity of 80 to 100 people. In addition they have an auditorium, barbecue pits, a lighted baseball diamond, an unlighted baseball diamond, lighted indoor basketball courts, lighted outdoor basketball courts, a children's play area, an indoor gymnasium without weights, picnic tables, and lighted volleyball courts. The Cheviot Hills Tennis Courts consists of fourteen lighted tennis courts. The Cheviot Hills Pool is an outdoor unheated seasonal pool in Cheviot Hills. On May 11, 2012, after a campaign fundraiser at the nearby home of actor George Clooney, President Barack Obama played a game of basketball at the Cheviot Hills Recreation Center with Clooney, actor Tobey Maguire and others.

There are also two private country clubs in the neighborhood, both of them founded in response to then-prevailing membership discrimination at other Los Angeles clubs. Hillcrest Country Club was founded in 1920 as a country club for Jews, then largely excluded from other clubs. It features an 18-hole golf course, tennis courts, and swimming pools. The Griffin Club, previously known as the Beverly Hills Country Club, was founded in 1926, and was originally intended for people working in the entertainment industry who, at that time, were also excluded by most Los Angeles clubs. It has tennis courts and swimming pools. In the past the neighborhood also contained the California Country Club, which was replaced by a development called California Country Club Estates in 1952. There is also a small park, Club Circle Park, in the heart of the neighborhood, and a playground, Irving Schachter Park, on the outskirts.

== Notable residents ==
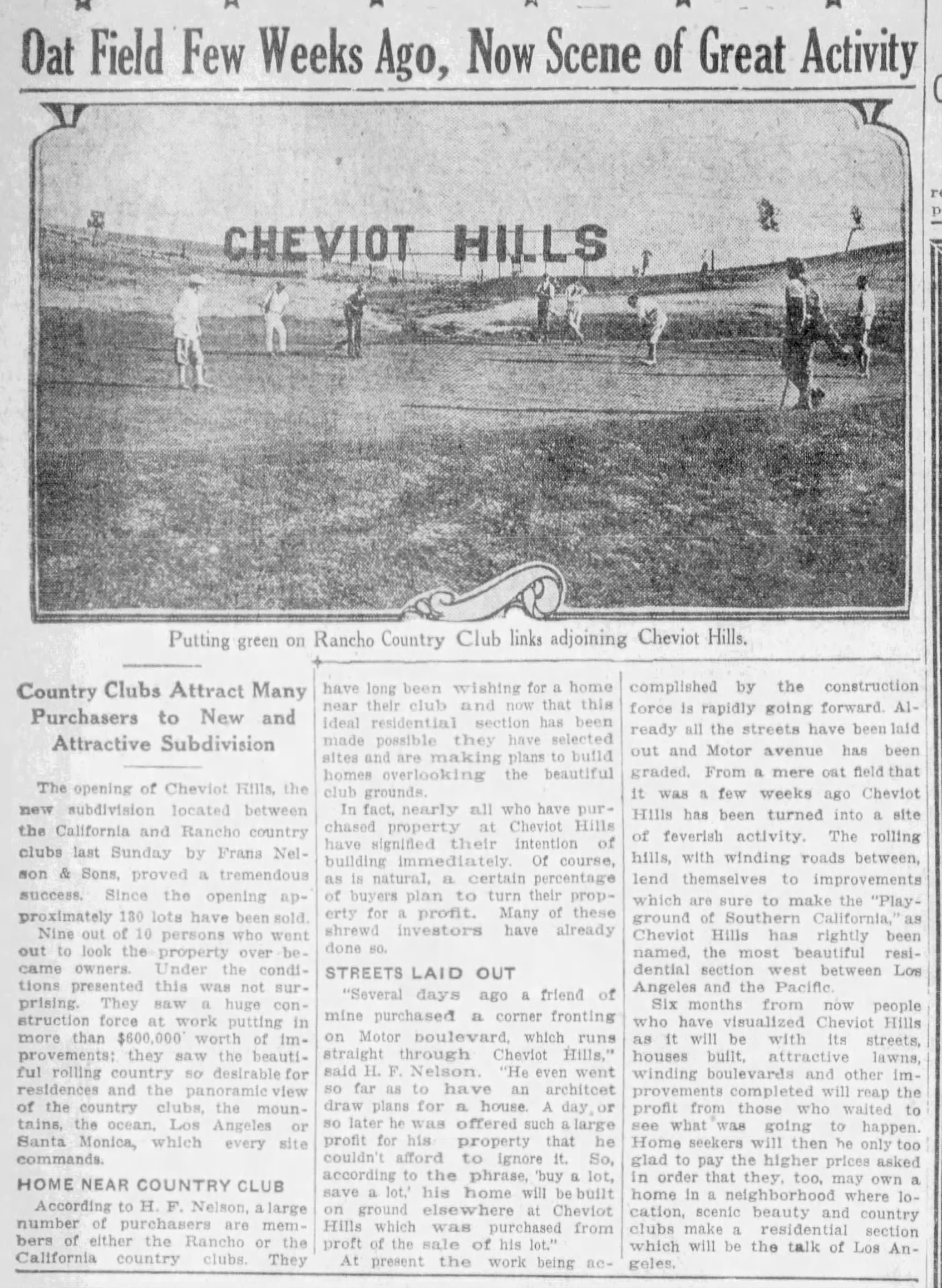
"Cheviot Hills" Los Angeles Evening Express, November 17, 1923

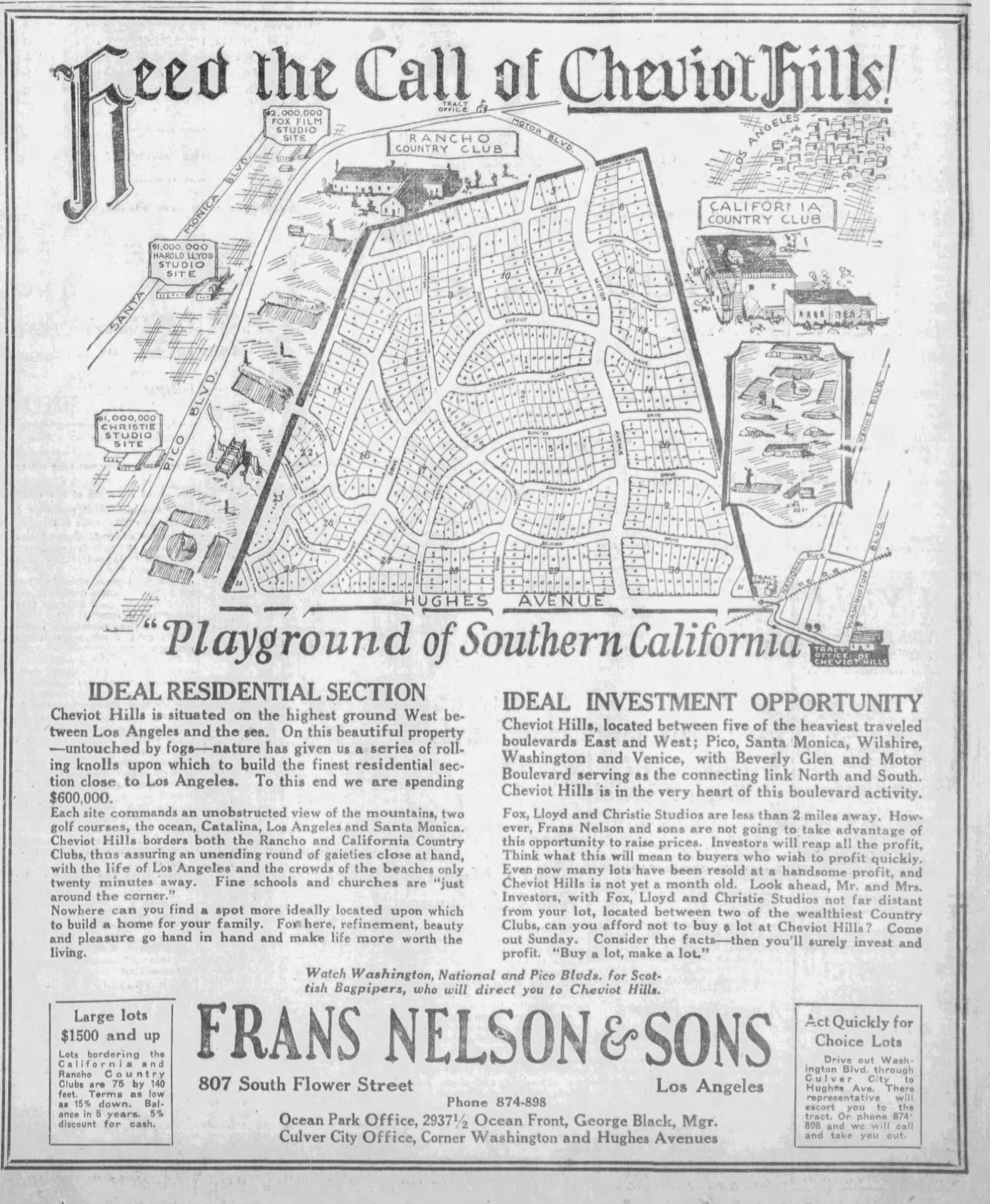
"Heed the Call of Cheviot Hills" Los Angeles Evening Express, November 17, 1923

- L. B. Abbott, cinematographer
- Maria Altmann, recovered Gustav Klimt paintings stolen from her family by the Nazis
- Lucie Arnaz, actress
- Lucille Ball, actress
- Travis Barker, drummer from Blink-182
- Nuno Bettencourt, musician
- Barbara Bel Geddes, actress
- Bruce Bennett, Olympic silver medalist, actor known for the role of Tarzan.
- Arthur Bergh, composer
- Jan Berry, singer
- Benjamin Franklin Bledsoe, judge, candidate for mayor of Los Angeles
- Ray Bradbury, author
- Ty Burrell, actor
- J. Curtis Counts, sixth director of the Federal Mediation and Conciliation Service
- Harry Culver, real estate developer who founded Culver City, California
- Vic Damone, singer
- Glenn Danzig, singer
- Brooklyn Decker, model, actress
- Kelly Emberg, model
- Alex Haley, author
- June Haver, actress
- Ted Healy, actor, creator of The Three Stooges
- Jonah Hill, actor
- Marin Hinkle, actress
- Anna Homler, artist
- Marianne Jean-Baptiste, actress
- Buster Keaton, actor
- Stan Laurel, actor
- Helie Lee, author, director
- Laurie Levenson, law professor
- Dave Madden, actor
- Marjorie Main, actress
- Thom Mayne, architect
- Michael McKean, actor
- Ken Mok, television producer
- Christoper Miller, writer, director, producer
- Agnes Moorehead, actress
- Trevor Morris, music producer, composer
- Bill Mumy, actor
- Joel Murray, actor
- George Newbern, actor
- Annette O'Toole, actress
- Jack Paar, comedian
- John Payne, actor
- Michelle Phillips, actress, singer best known for her vocals in the folk music band The Mamas & the Papas
- Paul Pierce, NBA player
- Mary Kay Place, actress
- Maureen Reagan, actress, daughter of Ronald Reagan
- Andy Roddick, professional tennis player
- Leo Rosten, screenwriter
- Hal Roach, film and television producer
- William Shatner, actor best known for the role Captain James T. Kirk in the Star Trek franchise.
- Phil Silvers, actor
- Patrick Soon-Shiong, billionaire founder of Abraxis BioScience and American Pharmaceutical Partners
- Pam Teeguarden, professional tennis player
- Henri Temianka, musician
- Daniel Thompson, inventor
- Marshall Thompson, actor
- Rudy Tomjanovich, former NBA player
- Joseph A. Valentine, Academy Award nominated cinematographer
- Tasia Valenza, actress
- Johnny Weissmuller, Olympic gold medalist, actor who succeeded Bennett in the role of Tarzan.
- Pete Wilson, governor of California and United States senator
- Valerie Zimring, Olympic gold medalist

== See also ==
- E Line (Los Angeles Metro)
- List of districts and neighborhoods of Los Angeles
