= AI Star/Centinela Hospital Classic =

Golf tournament

The AI Star/Centinela Hospital Classic was a golf tournament on the LPGA Tour from 1988 to 1989. It was played at the Rancho Park Golf Course in Los Angeles, California.

== Winners ==
- 1989 Pat Bradley
- 1988 Nancy Lopez
