= Denise Strebig =

American professional golfer (born 1960)

Personal information
- Full name: Denise Strebig-Haigh
- Nationality: United States
- Born: June 15, 1960 (age 66) San Bernardino, California
- Height: 5 ft 7 in (1.70 m)
- Spouse: Kerry Haigh
- Children: Maggi, Judy

Career
- Sport: Golf
- College: University of Southern California
- Turned professional: 1982
- Former tour: LPGA Tour (1983–89)

Best results in LPGA major championships
- Chevron Championship: T4: 1985
- Women's PGA C'ship: T55: 1986
- U.S. Women's Open: DNP
- du Maurier Classic: T53: 1987

Denise Strebig-Haigh (born June 15, 1960) is an American professional golfer who played on the LPGA Tour between 1983 and 1989.

== Career ==
Strebig was born in San Bernardino, California. She played college golf at the University of Southern California. She married tour official Kerry Haigh in 1988.
