= Barbara Barrow =

American professional golfer (born 1955)

Personal information
- Nationality: United States
- Born: April 15, 1955 (age 71)
- Height: 5 ft 11 in (1.80 m)

Career
- Sport: Golf
- College: San Diego State University
- Turned professional: 1977
- Former tour: LPGA Tour (1977–1987)
- Professional wins: 1

Number of wins by tour
- LPGA Tour: 1

Best results in LPGA major championships
- Chevron Championship: T63: 1984
- Women's PGA C'ship: T18: 1982
- U.S. Women's Open: T23: 1975
- du Maurier Classic: T34: 1981

Barbara Barrow (born April 15, 1955) is an American professional golfer who played on the LPGA Tour.

== Career ==
Barrow played college golf at San Diego State University, when in 1975 she won the national individual intercollegiate golf championship. She was a member of the U.S. Curtis Cup team in 1976.

Barrow turned professional after graduating and began playing on the LPGA Tour. She also coached the women's golf team at Long Beach State from 1977 to 1980.

Barrow won once on the LPGA Tour in 1980.

== Awards and honors ==
In 1992, Barrow was inducted into the San Diego State University Aztec Hall of Fame.

== Professional wins (1) ==
=== LPGA Tour wins (1) ===
| No. | Date | Tournament | Winning score | Margin of victory | Runner-up |
|---|---|---|---|---|---|
| 1 | Apr 27, 1980 | Birmingham Classic | −6 (71-72-67-210) | 1 stroke | (United States) Beth Daniel |

== Team appearances ==
Amateur

- Curtis Cup (representing the United States): 1976 (winners)
