= Michiko Okada =

Japanese professional golfer (born 1945)

Personal information
- Nationality: Japan
- Born: 11 January 1945 (age 81) Iwaki, Fukushima, Japan
- Height: 1.63 m (5 ft 4 in)

Career
- Sport: Golf
- Status: Professional
- Former tour: LPGA of Japan Tour (1968-2002)
- Professional wins: 10

Number of wins by tour
- LPGA Tour: 1
- LPGA of Japan Tour: 10

Michiko Okada (born 11 January 1945) is a Japanese professional golfer. She played on the LPGA of Japan Tour (JLPGA).

== Career ==
Okada won 10 times on the JLPGA between 1975 and 1995. One of Ohsako's JLPGA wins was co-sanctioned with the LPGA Tour, the 1978 Mizuno-Japan Classic.

== Professional wins (10) ==
=== LPGA of Japan Tour wins (10) ===
- 1975 (1) Lake Towada International Women's Open
- 1976 (1) Taisetsu Women's Open
- 1977 (1) Miyagi TV Cup Women's Open
- 1978 (1) Mizuno-Japan Classic (co-sanctioned with LPGA Tour)
- 1981 (1) West Sea National Park Women's Open
- 1983 (1) Hiroshima Women's Open
- 1986 (1) UCC Ladies
- 1989 (1) Mitsubishi Electric Infantas Ladies
- 1992 (1) Kosaido Asahi Golf Cup
- 1995 (1) Daio Paper Elleair Women's Open

=== LPGA Tour wins (1) ===
No.	Date	Tournament	Winning score	Margin of victory	Runners-up
1	3 Nov 1978	Mizuno-Japan Classic	−6 (73-74-69=216)	Playoff	(United States) Nancy Lopez (Taiwan) Ai-Yu Tu

LPGA Tour playoff record (1–0)

No.	Year	Tournament	Opponents	Result
1	1978	Mizuno-Japan Classic	(United States) Nancy Lopez (Taiwan) Ai-Yu Tu	Won with birdie on fifth extra hole Tu eliminated by birdie on second hole

== Team appearances ==
Professional

- Handa Cup (representing World team): 2006, 2007, 2008, 2009
