= 1989 LPGA Championship =

Coordinates: 39.349°N 84.278°W

Tournament information
- Dates: May 18–21, 1989
- Location: Mason, Ohio
- Courses: Jack Nicklaus Golf Center; Grizzly Course
- Tour: LPGA Tour
- Format: Stroke play - 72 holes

Statistics
- Par: 72
- Length: 6,359 yards (5,815 m)
- Cut: 149 (+5)
- Prize fund: $500,000
- Winner's share: $75,000

Champion
- (United States) Nancy Lopez
- 274 (−14)

Location in the United States
Location in Ohio

The 1989 LPGA Championship was held May 30 to June 2 at Jack Nicklaus Golf Center at Kings Island in Mason, Ohio, a suburb northeast of Cincinnati. Played on the Grizzly Course, this was the 35th edition of the LPGA Championship.

Nancy Lopez shot a final round 66 (−6) for 274 (−14), three strokes ahead of runner-up Ayako Okamoto, the third round leader.

It was the last of three major titles for Lopez; all came on the Grizzly Course at the LPGA Championship.

It was the also the last LPGA Championship at Kings Island, which had hosted twelve consecutive championships since 1978. The Kroger Senior Classic on the Senior PGA Tour replaced it in 1990.

== Final leaderboard ==
Sunday, May 21, 1989

Place	Player	Score	To par	Money ($)
1	(United States) Nancy Lopez	71-69-68-66=274	−14	75,000
2	(Japan) Ayako Okamoto	69-68-69-71=277	−11	46,250
3	(United States) Susan Sanders	72-67-71-68=278	−10	33,750
T4	(United States) Pat Bradley	67-72-71-73=283	−5	23,750
T4	(United States) Allison Finney	72-72-66-73=283	−5	23,750
6	(United States) Jane Geddes	69-73-71-71=284	−4	17,500
7	(United States) Patty Sheehan	69-72-66-78=285	−3	14,750
T8	(United States) Betsy King	69-67-72-78=286	−2	12,375
T8	(United States) Sherri Turner	72-70-74-70=286	−2	12,375
T10	(United States) Tammie Green	75-70-68-75=288	E	10,023
T10	(Sweden) Liselotte Neumann	73-73-72-70=288	E	10,023
