= 1985 Nabisco Dinah Shore =

Coordinates: 33.798°N 116.433°W

Tournament information
- Dates: April 4–7, 1985
- Location: Rancho Mirage, California
- Course: Mission Hills Country Club
- Tour: LPGA Tour
- Format: Stroke play - 72 holes

Statistics
- Par: 72
- Length: 6,275 yards (5,738 m)
- Field: 107 players, 79 after cut
- Cut: 151 (+7)
- Prize fund: $400,000
- Winner's share: $55,000

Champion
- (United States) Alice Miller
- 275 (−13)

Location in the United States
Location in California

The 1985 Nabisco Dinah Shore was a women's professional golf tournament, held April 4–7 at Mission Hills Country Club in Rancho Mirage, California. This was the 14th edition of the Nabisco Dinah Shore, and the third as a major championship.

Alice Miller shot a final round 67 (−5) to win her only major title, three strokes ahead of runner-up Jan Stephenson. Summer-like conditions prevailed, the temperature on Sunday afternoon was 95 °F (35 °C). On Saturday, Miller sank a forty-foot (12 m) birdie putt on the 18th green to end the third round with a one stroke lead over Patty Sheehan and Judy Clark.

Defending champion Juli Inkster was at even par, tied for 18th place.

== Final leaderboard ==
Sunday, April 7, 1985

Place	Player	Score	To par	Money ($)
1	(United States) Alice Miller	70-68-70-67=275	−13	55,000
2	(Australia) Jan Stephenson	71-68-73-66=278	−10	33,000
3	(United States) Judy Clark	69-68-72-70=279	−9	24,000
T4	(United States) Beth Solomon	76-68-69-68=281	−7	16,603
T4	(United States) Denise Strebig-Haigh	72-67-73-69=281	−7	16,603
6	(United States) Pat Bradley	70-74-69-70=283	−5	13,079
T7	(United States) Myra Blackwelder	68-76-72-68=284	−4	9,342
T7	(United States) Jane Geddes	71-70-72-71=284	−4	9,342
T7	(United States) Betsy King	70-68-75-71=284	−4	9,342
T7	(United States) Patty Sheehan	69-69-71-75=284	−4	9,342
