= Los Coyotes LPGA Classic =

Golf tournament formerly on the LPGA Tour

The Los Coyotes LPGA Classic was a golf tournament on the LPGA Tour from 1989 to 1992. It was played at the Los Coyotes Country Club in Buena Park, California.

== Winners ==
Los Coyotes LPGA Classic

- 1992 Nancy Scranton

MBS LPGA Classic

- 1991 Pat Bradley
- 1990 Nancy Lopez

Nippon Travel-MBS Classic

- 1989 Nancy Lopez
