= Donna White =

American professional golfer (born 1954)

Personal information
- Full name: Donna Horton White
- Nationality: United States
- Born: April 7, 1954 (age 72) Kinston, North Carolina, U.S.
- Height: 5 ft 2 in (1.57 m)

Career
- Sport: Golf
- College: University of Florida
- Former tour: LPGA Tour (1977–1992)
- Professional wins: 3

Number of wins by tour
- LPGA Tour: 3

Best results in LPGA major championships
- Chevron Championship: T14: 1984
- Women's PGA C'ship: T12: 1982
- U.S. Women's Open: T2: 1982
- du Maurier Classic: 4th: 1984

Donna Horton White (born April 7, 1954), née Horton, is an American professional golfer. She played on the LPGA Tour for 15 years from 1977 to 1992.

== Early life ==
White was born in Kinston, North Carolina in 1954. She had a successful amateur golf career, and was a semi-finalist in the 1971 U.S. Girls' Junior.

== Amateur career ==
White attended the University of Florida in Gainesville, Florida. She played for coach Mimi Ryan's Florida Gators women's golf team in Association for Intercollegiate Athletics for Women (AIAW) competition in 1975 and 1976. During her time as a Gator golfer, she was a four-time collegiate medalist. She graduated from Florida with a bachelor's degree in health and human performance in 1976.

She had success in other events while in college. She had much success at the U.S. Women's Amateur during this era: she was a semi-finalist in 1973, runner-up in 1975, and champion in 1976. She also won the 1976 Trans-National Amateur.

== Professional career ==
White played on the LPGA Tour for 16 years (1977–1992). She won three tour events, including the 1980 Florida Lady Citrus, the 1980 Coca-Cola Classic, and the 1983 Sarasota Classic. Her best finish in a LPGA major was a tie for second in the 1982 U.S. Women's Open. She also finished fourth at the 1984 du Maurier Classic after opening the final round one shot out of the lead. White retired after the 1992 season, with total career winnings of $908,589.

== Personal life ==
She married Mike White; he also graduated from University of Florida, where he played baseball, in December 1976. He is a longtime school teacher in Belle Glade and she runs golf operations for Palm Beach County courses.

== Awards and honors ==
In 1978, she was inducted into the University of Florida Athletic Hall of Fame as a "Gator Great."

== Amateur wins ==
- 1976 U.S. Women's Amateur, Trans-National Amateur

== Professional wins ==
=== LPGA Tour wins (3) ===
No.	Date	Tournament	Winning score	Margin of victory	Runner(s)-up
1	Apr 20, 1980	Florida Lady Citrus	−9 (70-73-70-70=283)	1 stroke	(United States) Jane Blalock
2	May 18, 1980	Coca-Cola Classic	−2 (75-70-72=217)	Playoff	(United States) Debbie Massey
3	Feb 13, 1983	Sarasota Classic	−4 (71-69-76-68=284)	1 stroke	(United States) JoAnne Carner (United States) Nancy Lopez (United States) Alice Miller

LPGA Tour playoff record (1–1)

No.	Year	Tournament	Opponent(s)	Result
1	1980	Coca-Cola Classic	(United States) Debbie Massey	Won with par on first extra hole
2	1983	Rochester International	(Japan) Ayako Okamoto (United States) Kathy Whitworth	Okamoto won with birdie on third extra hole

== U.S. national team appearances ==
Amateur

- Curtis Cup: 1976 (winners)
- Espirito Santo Trophy: 1976 (winners)

== See also ==
- List of Florida Gators women's golfers on the LPGA Tour
- List of University of Florida alumni
- List of University of Florida Athletic Hall of Fame members
