= ERA Real Estate Classic =

Golf tournament

The ERA Real Estate Classic was a golf tournament on the LPGA Tour from 1979 to 1980. It was played at Brookridge Country Club in Overland Park, Kansas.

== Winners ==
- 1980 Donna Caponi
- 1979 Sandra Post
