= Alice Miller (golfer) =

American professional golfer (born 1958)

Personal information
- Full name: Alice Miller
- Nationality: United States
- Born: May 15, 1956 (age 70) Marysville, California, U.S.
- Height: 5 ft 10 in (1.78 m)

Career
- Sport: Golf
- College: Arizona State University
- Turned professional: 1978
- Former tour: LPGA Tour (1978–1998)
- Professional wins: 9

Number of wins by tour
- LPGA Tour: 8
- Other: 1

Best results in LPGA major championships (wins: 1)
- Chevron Championship: Won: 1985
- Women's PGA C'ship: 2nd: 1985
- U.S. Women's Open: T17: 1985
- du Maurier Classic: T2: 1983

Alice Miller (born May 15, 1956) is an American professional golfer. She became a member of the LPGA Tour in 1978 and won eight LPGA Tour events, including one major championship, during her career.

== Amateur career ==
Miller was born in Marysville, California. She played on the Marysville HS golf team the first year that golf became coed. She was scouted by Arizona State golf coach. She attended Arizona State University and played on the 1975 AIAW National Collegiate Championship team.

== Professional career ==
Miller joined the LPGA Tour in 1978. Between 1983 and 1991 she won eight titles on the tour, including one major championship, the 1985 Nabisco Dinah Shore. She also had her highest finish on the money list that year, when she placed third. She served as president of the LPGA Tour in 1993. She retired from the LPGA Tour after the 1998 season.

== Professional wins ==
=== LPGA Tour (8) ===
Legend
LPGA Tour major championships (1)
Other LPGA Tour (7)

No.	Date	Tournament	Winning score	Margin of victory	Runner(s)-up
1	Jun 5, 1983	West Virginia LPGA Classic	E (70-73-73=216)	Playoff	(United States) Lori Garbacz (United States) Debbie Massey
2	Feb 12, 1984	Sarasota Classic	−8 (68-68-75-69=280)	1 stroke	(United States) Donna Caponi
3	Aug 5, 1984	West Virginia LPGA Classic	−7 (67-70-72=209)	2 strokes	(United States) Beverly Klass (United States) Vicki Singleton
4	Apr 7, 1985	Nabisco Dinah Shore	−13 (70-68-70-67=275)	3 strokes	(Australia) Jan Stephenson
5	Apr 28, 1985	S&H Golf Classic	−16 (70-69-67-66=272)	6 strokes	(United States) Kay Kennedy (United States) Mindy Moore
6	Jun 9, 1985	McDonald's Championship	−16 (68-68-68-68=272)	8 strokes	(United States) Nancy Lopez
7	Jun 23, 1985	Mayflower Classic	−8 (67-76-67-70=280)	6 strokes	(United States) Jane Blalock (United States) Beth Solomon (United States) Mary Beth Zimmerman
8	Jul 7, 1991	Jamie Farr Toledo Classic	−8 (69-66-70=205)	Playoff	(United States) Deb Richard

LPGA Tour playoff record (2–0)

No.	Year	Tournament	Opponent(s)	Result
1	1983	West Virginia LPGA Classic	(United States) Lori Garbacz (United States) Debbie Massey	Won with birdie on fourth extra hole Massey eliminated by birdie on third hole
2	1991	Jamie Farr Toledo Classic	(United States) Deb Richard	Won with birdie on third extra hole

=== Other (1) ===
- 1985 Mazda Champions (with Don January)

== Major championships ==
=== Wins (1) ===
Year	Championship	Winning score	Margin	Runner-up
1985	Nabisco Dinah Shore	−13 (70-68-70-67=275)	3 strokes	(Australia) Jan Stephenson

=== Results timeline ===
Tournament	1974	1975	1976	1977	1978
LPGA Championship					
U.S. Women's Open	CUT	CUT	CUT	CUT	66

Tournament	1979	1980	1981	1982	1983	1984	1985	1986	1987	1988	1989	1990
Kraft Nabisco Championship					T13	T16	1	T54	CUT	CUT	CUT	CUT
LPGA Championship	T57	CUT		T35	T8	T41	2	CUT	CUT	CUT	CUT	WD
U.S. Women's Open	50	CUT	T56	CUT	T35	T20	T12	T40	CUT			
du Maurier Classic	CUT		T7	T19	T2	T28	T43	CUT		T57	CUT	CUT

Tournament	1991	1992	1993	1994	1995	1996	1997	1998	1999	2000
Kraft Nabisco Championship	CUT	T39	T56	T36	CUT	CUT	CUT	CUT		
LPGA Championship	T59	CUT	CUT	T66	CUT	CUT	T46	CUT		
U.S. Women's Open	T36		T26	CUT		CUT				
du Maurier Classic	CUT	CUT	CUT	T31	CUT	T78	CUT			

Tournament	2001	2002	2003	2004
Kraft Nabisco Championship			CUT	CUT
LPGA Championship				
U.S. Women's Open				
Women's British Open ^				

^ The Women's British Open replaced the du Maurier Classic as an LPGA major in 2001.

Win
Top 10
Did not play

CUT = missed the half-way cut
WD = withdrew
"T" = tied

=== Summary ===
Tournament	Wins	2nd	3rd	Top-5	Top-10	Top-25	Events	Cuts made
Kraft Nabisco Championship	1	0	0	1	1	3	18	7
LPGA Championship	0	1	0	1	2	2	19	8
U.S. Women's Open	0	0	0	0	0	2	18	9
du Maurier Classic	0	1	0	1	2	3	17	8
Women's British Open	0	0	0	0	0	0	0	0
Totals	1	2	0	3	5	10	72	32

- Most consecutive cuts made – 13 (1983 Nabisco – 1986 Nabisco)
- Longest streak of top-10s – 2 (twice)
