= Colgate European Open =

English golf tournament

The Colgate European Open was a women's professional golf tournament on the LPGA Tour from 1974 to 1979. It was an unofficial event in 1974 and 1975. It was played at the Sunningdale Golf Club in Berkshire, England.

== Winners ==
Colgate European Open

- 1979 Nancy Lopez
- 1978 Nancy Lopez

Colgate European Women's Open

- 1977 Judy Rankin

Colgate European Open

- 1976 Hisako "Chako" Higuchi

As unofficial event

- 1975 Donna Caponi
- 1974 Judy Rankin
