= Allison Finney =

American professional golfer (born 1958)

Personal information
- Nationality: United States
- Born: November 17, 1958 (age 67) Evanston, Illinois, U.S.
- Height: 5 ft 7 in (1.70 m)

Career
- Sport: Golf
- College: Stanford University
- Status: Professional
- Current tour: Legends Tour
- Former tour: LPGA Tour (1983–2006)
- Professional wins: 1

Number of wins by tour
- LPGA Tour: 1

Best results in LPGA major championships
- Chevron Championship: T23: 1989
- Women's PGA C'ship: T4: 1989
- U.S. Women's Open: T22: 1993
- du Maurier Classic: T14: 1998
- Women's British Open: DNP

Allison Finney (born November 17, 1958) is an American professional golfer who played on the LPGA Tour.

== Career ==
Finney won once on the LPGA Tour in 1989.

== Professional wins (1) ==
=== LPGA Tour wins (1) ===
No.	Date	Tournament	Winning score	Margin of victory	Runner-up
1	Mar 26, 1989	Standard Register Turquoise Classic	−10 (66-69-74-73=282)	1 stroke	(United States) Beth Daniel
