= Moss Creek Women's Invitational =

Golf tournament formerly on the LPGA Tour

The Moss Creek Women's Invitational was a golf tournament in South Carolina on the LPGA Tour from 1976 to 1985. It was played at the Moss Creek Plantation on Hilton Head Island.

When first announced in January 1976, it was titled the "Ladies Masters" and sponsors planned to pattern the event after the Masters Tournament. A little over a month later, the LPGA announced the tournament's name was being changed to the Women's International. This happened after Masters Tournament officials contacted the tournament's sponsor and threatened to go to court unless the word Masters was removed from the tournament title.

Sally Little, an eventual winner of 15 LPGA events (including two majors), won the inaugural Women's International by one shot over Jan Stephenson. Needing to get up and down from a bunker at the final green to force a playoff, she holed out from 75 feet (23 m) for her first win as a professional.

== Winners ==
Moss Creek Women's Invitational

- 1985 Amy Alcott

CPC International

- 1984 No tournament
- 1983 Hollis Stacy (2)

CPC Women's International

- 1982 Kathy Whitworth
- 1981 Sally Little (2)
- 1980 Hollis Stacy

Women's International

- 1979 Nancy Lopez
- 1978 Jan Stephenson
- 1977 Sandra Palmer
- 1976 Sally Little
