= Hollis Stacy =

American professional golfer (born 1954)

Personal information
- Full name: Hollis Stacy
- Nationality: United States
- Born: March 16, 1954 (age 72) Savannah, Georgia, U.S.
- Height: 5 ft 5 in (1.65 m)

Career
- Sport: Golf
- College: Rollins College
- Turned professional: 1974
- Former tour: LPGA Tour (1974–2000)
- Professional wins: 21

Number of wins by tour
- LPGA Tour: 18
- LPGA of Japan Tour: 1
- Other: 2

Best results in LPGA major championships (wins: 4)
- Chevron Championship: T5: 1993
- Women's PGA C'ship: T7: 1976, 1982
- U.S. Women's Open: Won: 1977, 1978, 1984
- du Maurier Classic: Won: 1983

Achievements and awards
- World Golf Hall of Fame: 2012 (member page)

Hollis Stacy (born March 16, 1954) is an American professional golfer. She became a member of the LPGA Tour in 1974, winning four major championships and 18 LPGA Tour events. She was inducted into the World Golf Hall of Fame in the veterans category in 2012.

== Early life and amateur career ==
Stacy was born and raised in Savannah, Georgia. She won the U.S. Girls' Junior three consecutive times, the only player to accomplish this feat, in 1969, 1970, and 1971. In 1970, she won the North and South Women's Amateur at Pinehurst, and played for the 1972 United States Curtis Cup team.

Stacy attended Rollins College in Winter Park, Florida.

== Professional career ==
In 1974, Stacy turned pro. She won four major championships during her career: the U.S. Women's Open in 1977, 1978, and 1984, and the 1983 Peter Jackson Classic (later known as the du Maurier Classic).

She had 18 LPGA wins in total; the last win came in 1991 at the Crestar-Farm Fresh Classic. She played on the LPGA Tour through 2000, then became eligible to join the newly founded Women's Senior Golf Tour (now Legends Tour) in 2001. She won the Shopko Great Lakes Classic in 2001.

== Amateur wins ==
- 1969 U.S. Girls' Junior
- 1970 U.S. Girls' Junior, North and South Women's Amateur
- 1971 U.S. Girls' Junior

== Professional wins (21) ==
=== LPGA Tour wins (18) ===
Legend
LPGA Tour major championships (4)
Other LPGA Tour (14)

No.	Date	Tournament	Winning score	Margin of victory	Runner(s)-up
1	May 8, 1977	Lady Tara Classic	−7 (69-70-70=209)	1 stroke	(United States) JoAnne Carner
2	Jul 24, 1977	U.S. Women's Open	+4 (70-73-75-74=292)	2 strokes	(United States) Nancy Lopez
3	Sep 4, 1977	Rail Muscular Dystrophy Classic	−17 (68-65-69-69=271)	8 strokes	(United States) Betty Burfeindt
4	Apr 16, 1978	Birmingham Classic	−9 (70-69-68=207)	3 strokes	(United States) Jane Blalock (United States) Pat Meyers
5	Jun 23, 1978	U.S. Women's Open	+5 (70-75-72-72=289)	1 stroke	(United States) JoAnne Carner (South Africa) Sally Little
6	Jul 8, 1979	Mayflower Classic	−3 (74-67-72=213)	Playoff	(United States) Laura Baugh (United States) Judy Rankin
7	May 4, 1980	CPC Women's International	−9 (70-68-71-70=279)	Playoff	(United States) Amy Alcott
8	Aug 9, 1981	West Virginia Bank Classic	−4 (68-70-74=212)	Playoff	(United States) Susie McAllister (United States) Kathy Postlewait (Australia) Penny Pulz (United States) Alice Ritzman
9	Oct 11, 1981	Inamori Classic	−6 (70-76-70-70=286)	Playoff	(United States) Amy Alcott (United States) Donna Caponi (Australia) Jan Stephenson
10	Jan 31, 1982	Whirlpool Championship of Deer Creek	−6 (67-70-72-73=282)	Playoff	(United States) JoAnne Carner
11	Feb 14, 1982	S&H Golf Classic	−12 (66-71-67=204)	1 stroke	(United States) Patty Sheehan
12	Jul 11, 1982	West Virginia LPGA Classic	−7 (71-66-72=209)	Playoff	(United States) Kathy Postlewait
13	Apr 24, 1983	S&H Golf Classic	−11 (70-66-69-72=277)	6 strokes	(United States) Deedee Lasker (United States) Patty Sheehan
14	May 1, 1983	CPC International	−3 (67-71-74-73=285)	1 stroke	(United States) Beth Daniel
15	Jul 3, 1983	Peter Jackson Classic	−11 (68-68-73-68=277)	2 strokes	(United States) JoAnne Carner (United States) Alice Miller
16	Jul 15, 1984	U.S. Women's Open	+2 (74-72-75-69=290)	1 stroke	(United States) Rosie Jones
17	Jan 27, 1985	Mazda Classic of Deer Creek	−8 (72-71-70-67=280)	1 stroke	(Japan) Ayako Okamoto
18	May 12, 1991	Crestar-Farm Fresh Classic	−6 (70-71-72-69=282)	1 stroke	(United States) Elaine Crosby (United States) Tammie Green (United States) Patty Sheehan

LPGA Tour playoff record (6–4)

No.	Year	Tournament	Opponent(s)	Result
1	1978	American Defender Classic	(United States) Amy Alcott	Lost to birdie on first extra hole
2	1978	Birmingham Classic	(United States) Janet Coles (United States) Gloria Ehret	Coles won with birdie on third extra hole Stacy eliminated by par on first hole
3	1979	Coca-Cola Classic	(United States) Bonnie Bryant (United States) Nancy Lopez (United States) Jo Ann Washam (United States) Mickey Wright	Lopez won with birdie on second extra hole Bryant, Stacy, and Washam eliminated by birdie on first hole
4	1979	Mayflower Classic	(United States) Laura Baugh (United States) Judy Rankin	Won with par on second extra hole Rankin eliminated by par on first hole
5	1980	CPC Women's International	(United States) Amy Alcott	Won with birdie on first extra hole
6	1981	CPC Women's International	(South Africa) Sally Little (United States) Kathy Whitworth	Little won with birdie on first extra hole
7	1981	West Virginia Bank Classic	(United States) Susie McAllister (United States) Kathy Postlewait (Australia) Penny Pulz (United States) Alice Ritzman	Won with birdie on first extra hole
8	1981	Inamori Classic	(United States) Amy Alcott (United States) Donna Caponi (Australia) Jan Stephenson	Won with birdie on first extra hole
9	1982	Whirlpool Championship of Deer Creek	(United States) JoAnne Carner	Won with birdie on fifth extra hole
10	1982	West Virginia LPGA Classic	(United States) Kathy Postlewait	Won with par on first extra hole

=== LPGA of Japan Tour wins (1) ===
- 1984 Nichirei Cup Japan-US Women's Professional Golf Team Championship

=== Legends Tour wins (1) ===
- 2001 Shopko Great Lakes Classic

=== Other wins (1) ===
- 1977 Pepsi-Cola Mixed Team Championship (with Jerry Pate)

== Major championships ==
=== Wins (4) ===
Year	Championship	Winning score	Margin	Runner(s)-up
1977	U.S. Women's Open	+4 (70-73-75-74=292)	2 strokes	(United States) Nancy Lopez
1978	U.S. Women's Open	+5 (70-75-72-72=289)	1 stroke	(United States) JoAnne Carner, (South Africa) Sally Little
1983	Peter Jackson Classic	−11 (71-75-67-66=277)	2 strokes	(United States) JoAnne Carner, (United States) Alice Miller
1984	U.S. Women's Open	+2 (74-72-75-69=290)	1 stroke	(United States) Rosie Jones

=== Results timeline ===
Tournament	1970	1971	1972	1973	1974	1975	1976	1977	1978	1979	1980
Titleholders Championship			T27								
LPGA Championship						T29	T7	CUT	T9	T47	T10
U.S. Women's Open	CUT	CUT	CUT	T25	T14	CUT	T23	1	1	T15	2
du Maurier Classic										T25	T38

Tournament	1981	1982	1983	1984	1985	1986	1987	1988	1989	1990
Kraft Nabisco Championship			T35	T28	T13	T14	T11	T35	T31	CUT
LPGA Championship	T12	T7	T11	20	T25	T28	T14	CUT	T43	CUT
U.S. Women's Open	T10	T49	T32	1	CUT	T11	T33	T52	T37	T9
du Maurier Classic	T7	T16	1	16	T10	CUT	T31	T23	T24	T67

Tournament	1991	1992	1993	1994	1995	1996	1997	1998	1999	2000
Kraft Nabisco Championship	CUT	T39	T5	T9	CUT	8	T35		T21	CUT
LPGA Championship	T26	T18	CUT	45	CUT	CUT	T53	T63	T36	CUT
U.S. Women's Open	T41	CUT	CUT	CUT	T37	CUT	CUT	T15	CUT	CUT
du Maurier Classic	T77	T33	T52	CUT	T9	T36	T41	T27	CUT	CUT

Win
Top 10
Did not play

CUT = missed the half-way cut
"T" = tied

=== Summary ===
Tournament	Wins	2nd	3rd	Top-5	Top-10	Top-25	Events	Cuts made
Kraft Nabisco Championship	0	0	0	1	3	7	17	13
LPGA Championship	0	0	0	0	4	10	26	19
U.S. Women's Open	3	1	0	4	6	12	31	19
du Maurier Classic	1	0	0	1	4	9	22	18
Titleholders Championship	0	0	0	0	0	0	1	1
Totals	4	1	0	6	17	38	97	70

- Most consecutive cuts made – 25 (1977 U.S. Open – 1985 LPGA)
- Longest streak of top-10s – 3 (twice)

== Team appearances ==
Amateur

- Curtis Cup (representing the United States): 1972 (winners)

== See also ==
- List of golfers with most LPGA Tour wins
- List of golfers with most LPGA major championship wins
