= Barth Classic =

Golf tournament formerly on the LPGA Tour

The Barth Classic was a golf tournament on the LPGA Tour from 1974 to 1980. It was played at the Plymouth Country Club in Plymouth, Indiana.

== Winners ==
Hoosier LPGA Classic

- 1974 JoAnne Carner

Hoosier Classic

- 1975 Betsy Cullen
- 1976 JoAnne Carner (2)
- 1977 Debbie Austin
- 1978 Pat Bradley

Barth Classic

- 1979 Sally Little
- 1980 Sandra Spuzich
