= Sarasota Classic =

Golf tournament formerly on the LPGA Tour

The Sarasota Classic was a golf tournament on the LPGA Tour from 1976 to 1988. It was played at Bent Tree Country Club in Sarasota, Florida.

== Winners ==
Sarasota Classic

- 1988 Patty Sheehan
- 1987 Nancy Lopez
- 1986 Patty Sheehan
- 1985 Patty Sheehan
- 1984 Alice Miller
- 1983 Donna White

Bent Tree Ladies Classic

- 1982 Beth Daniel
- 1981 Amy Alcott
- 1980 JoAnne Carner

Bent Tree Classic

- 1979 Sally Little
- 1978 Nancy Lopez
- 1977 Judy Rankin
- 1976 Kathy Whitworth
