= Honda Civic Classic =

Golf tournament formerly on the LPGA Tour

The Honda Civic Classic was a golf tournament on the LPGA Tour in 1975 and from 1977 to 1980. It was played at the Whispering Palms Country Club in Rancho Santa Fe, California in 1975 and 1977 and at the Rancho Bernardo Inn in San Diego, California from 1978 to 1980.

== Winners ==
Honda Civic Golf Classic

- 1980 JoAnne Carner

Honda Civic Classic

- 1979 JoAnne Carner

Kathryn Crosby/Honda Civic Classic

- 1978 Sally Little
- 1977 Sandra Palmer

Golf Inns of America

- 1976 No tournament
- 1975 Mary Bea Porter
