= West Virginia LPGA Classic =

Golf tournament formerly on the LPGA Tour

The West Virginia LPGA Classic was a golf tournament on the LPGA Tour from 1974 to 1984. It was played at the Speidel Golf Club in Wheeling, West Virginia.

== Winners ==
West Virginia LPGA Classic

- 1984 Alice Miller
- 1983 Alice Miller
- 1982 Hollis Stacy

West Virginia Bank Classic

- 1981 Hollis Stacy

West Virginia LPGA Classic

- 1980 Sandra Post

Wheeling Classic

- 1979 Debbie Massey
- 1978 Jane Blalock
- 1977 Debbie Austin
- 1976 Jane Blalock

Wheeling Ladies Classic

- 1975 Susie McAllister
- 1974 Carole Jo Skala
