= 2021 U.S. Senior Women's Open =

Golf tournament

Tournament information
- Dates: July 29 – August 1, 2021
- Location: Fairfield, Connecticut, U.S. 41°11′11″N 73°13′33″W
- Course: Brooklawn Country Club
- Organized by: USGA
- Tour: Legends Tour
- Format: 72 holes stroke play

Statistics
- Par: 72
- Length: Round 1: 5,981 yards (5,469 m); Round 2: 5.813 yards (5.315 m); Round 3: 5,959 yards (5,449 m); Round 4: 5,995 yards (5,482 m)
- Field: 120 players, 51 after cut
- Cut: 152 (+8)
- Prize fund: $1,000,000
- Winner's share: $180,000

Champion
- (Sweden) Annika Sörenstam
- 276 (−12)
- Location in the United States Location in Connecticut

The 2021 U.S. Senior Women's Open was the third U.S. Senior Women's Open. It was a professional golf tournament organized by the United States Golf Association, open to women over 50 years of age. The championship was played at the Brooklawn Country Club, Fairfield, Connecticut, United States, from July 29 to August 1 and won by Annika Sörenstam.

It was held one year after its original plan, as the 2020 championship was canceled due to health concerns stemming from the COVID-19 pandemic. It was scheduled for Brooklawn Country Club.

== Venue ==
The hosting club was founded in 1895. It had previously hosted four USGA Championships, including the 1979 U.S. Women's Open.

=== Course layout ===
The final length came to differ between each round. Fourth round length is shown.

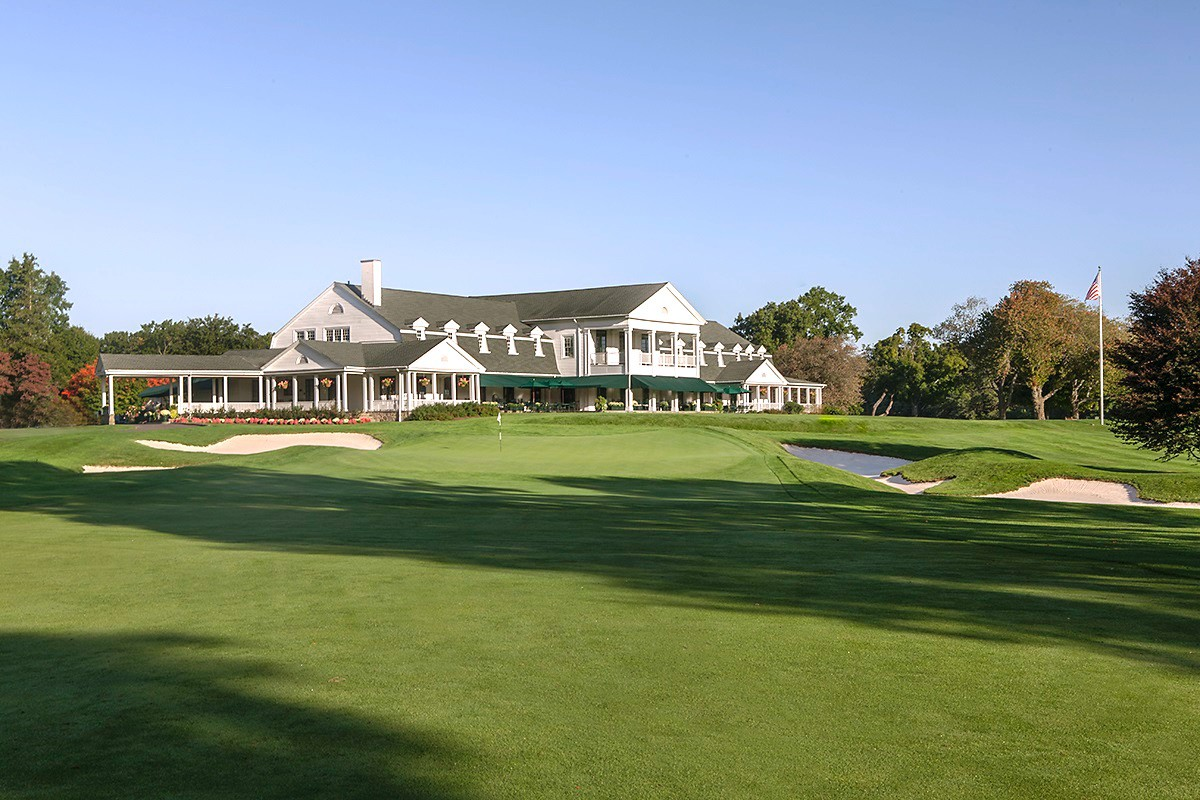
Clubhouse and 18th green at Brooklawn Country Club

Hole	Yards	Par	Hole	Yards	Par
1	435	5	10	113	3
2	170	3	11	516	5
3	339	4	12	293	4
4	391	4	13	310	4
5	160	3	14	401	4
6	355	4	15	144	3
7	546	5	16	314	4
8	396	5	17	385	4
9	338	4	18	389	4
Out	3,130	37	In	2,865	35
			Total	5,995	72

== Format ==
The walking-only tournament was played over 72 holes of stroke play, with the top 50 and ties making the 36-hole cut.

== Field ==
The championship was open to any professional or amateur golfer who was 50 years of age or over as of July 29, however restricted by a certain handicap level.

390 players entered the competition, either exempt through some of several exemption categories or entering sectional qualifying at sites nationwide in the summer of 2021.

The final field of 120 players, consisting of 87 professionals and 33 amateurs, included 60 exempt players, while 60 players earned their spots in the field via qualifying.

=== Exempt from qualifying ===
Many players were exempt in multiple categories. Players are listed only once, in the first category in which they became exempt. (Note: (a) – denotes amateur) (Note: Players in italics did not play.)

1. Former winners of the U.S. Senior Women's Open Championship

- Laura Davies (2018)
- Helen Alfredsson (2019)

2. From the 2019 U.S. Senior Women's Open Championship, the 20 lowest scorers and anyone tying for 20th place

- Danielle Ammaccapane
- Nanci Bowen
- Lisa DePaulo
- Cheryl Fox
- Jackie Gallagher-Smith
- Tammie Green
- Suzy Green-Roebuck
- Juli Inkster
- Becky Iverson
- Trish Johnson
- Barbara Moxness
- Michele Redman
- Yuko Saito
- Laura Shanahan-Rowe
- Maggie Will
- Donna Andrews, Jane Crafter, and Wendy Doolan did not play.

3. From the 2019 U.S. Senior Women's Open Championship, the amateur(s) returning the lowest 72-hole score

- Sally Krueger (a)
- Judith Kyrinis (a)

4. Winners of the U.S. Women's Open Championship who reached their 50th birthday on or before July 29, 2021 (ten year exemption (Note: For the first three editions of the championship (2018–2021), players eligible in categories that required them to be 50 to 52, 54 or 59, were eligible regardless of age provided they were 50 or older.))

- Amy Alcott
- Jerilyn Britz
- JoAnne Carner
- Jane Geddes
- Liselotte Neumann
- Alison Nicholas
- Annika Sörenstam
- Hollis Stacy
- Jan Stephenson
- Janet Alex Anderson, Kathy Baker Guadagnino, Susie Berning, Pat Bradley, Donna Caponi, Kathy Cornelius, Sandra Haynie, Betsy King, Catherine Lacoste, Murle Lindstrom, Meg Mallon, Lauri Merten, Mary Mills, Sandra Palmer, Betsy Rawls and Patty Sheehan did not play

5. From the 2019, 2020 & 2021 U.S. Women's Open Championship, any player returning a 72-hole score who is age eligible.

6. Any professional or applicant for reinstatement who has won the U.S. Women's Amateur Championship, and who has reached their 50th birthday on or before July 29, 2021 (three-year exemption)

- Laura Baugh
- Carolyn Hill
- Pat Hurst
- Joanne Pacillo Foreman
- Kay Cockerill, Jean Ashley Crawford, Beth Daniel, Mary Lou Dill, Amy Fruhwirth, Michiko Hattori, Cindy Hill, Donna Horton, Deb Richard, Cathy Sherk and Pearl Sinn did not play.

7. Winners of the U.S. Women's Amateur Championship who reached their 50th birthday on or before July 29, 2021 (must be an amateur; five-year exemption)

- Carol Semple Thompson
- Mary Budke, Martha Kirouac, Patricia Lesser Harbottle, Barbara McIntire, Anne Quast Sander, Marlene Stewart Streit did not play.

8. Winners of the 2018 and 2019 U.S. Senior Women's Amateur Championship, and the 2019 runner-up (must be an amateur)

- Lara Tennant (2018 and 2019 champion)
- Sue Wooster (2019 runner-up)

9. Winners of the 2018 and 2019 U.S. Women's Mid-Amateur Championship (must be an amateur)

10. Playing members of the two most recent United States and Great Britain & Ireland Curtis Cup Teams, and the two most current United States Women's World Amateur Teams (must be an amateur)

11. Winners of the 2017-2019 Senior LPGA Championship, and the 2018 and 2019 runners-up

12. From the 2019 Senior LPGA Championship, the 10 lowest scorers and anyone tying for 10th place

- Jean Bartholomew
- Lisa Grimes
- Rosie Jones

13. From the final 2018 and 2019 official Legends Tour Performance Points list, the top 30 point leaders and ties

- Alica Dibos
- Cindy Figg-Currier
- Christa Johnson
- Cathy Johnston-Forbes
- Marilyn Lovander
- Susie Redman
- Barb Mucha did not play

14. Winners of the Legends Tour co-sponsored events, excluding team events, whose victories are considered official, in 2018 and 2019 and during the current calendar year to the initiation of the current year's U.S. Senior Women's Open Championship (events minimum of 36 holes)

15. Winners of the LPGA Teaching & Club Professional Championship (Championship Division) from 2015 to 2019, and the five lowest scores and ties from the most recent Championship (2019)

- Laurie Rinker (2015)

16. From the 2019 LPGA Teaching & Club Professional Championship (Senior Division), the three lowest scores and ties

- Jamie Fischer

17. Winners of the 2019 R&A Women's Senior Amateur and Canadian Women's Senior Amateur Championships (must be an amateur)

18. Winners of the following events when deemed a major by the LPGA Tour and who reached their 50th birthday on or before July 29, 2021. ANA Inspiration (1983-present); Evian Championship (2013–present); AIG Women's British Open (2019–present); Ricoh Women's British Open (2001–18); du Maurier Classic (1979-2000); KPMG Women's PGA Championship (1955-present); Titleholders Championship (1946-66 & 1972) or Western Open (1930-1967). (This is a ten year exemption)

- Catriona Matthew
- Nancy Scranton
- Jody Anschutz, Gloria Ehret, Shirley Englehorn, Marlene Hagge, Chako Higuchi, Judy Kimball, Jenny Lidback, Sally Little, Nancy Lopez, Alice Miller, Martha Nause, Dottie Pepper, Sandra Post, Kelly Robbins, Sherry Steinhauer, Sherri Turner, Kathy Whitworth and Joyce Ziski did not play.

19. From the final 2020 LPGA Tour all-time money list, the top 10 players who are age-eligible and not otherwise exempt as of March 29, 2021

- Elaine Crosby
- Judy Dickinson
- Michelle Estill
- Carin Hjalmarsson
- Cindy Rarick
- Cindy Schreyer
- Vicki Fergon, Kate Golden, Penny Hammel and Alice Ritzman did not play.

20. From the final 2019 LPGA Tour all-time money list, the top 150 money leaders and ties who are age-eligible

- Val Skinner
- Kristi Albers
- Lorie Kane
- Kris Tschetter
- Michelle McGann
- Dale Eggeling and Kim Saiki-Maloney did not play

21. Winners of the LPGA Tour co-sponsored events, whose victories are considered official, from 2015 to 2020, and during the current calendar year to the initiation of the 2021 U.S. Senior Women's Open Championship

22. Playing members of the five most current United States and European Solheim Cup Teams

23. From the 2019 and 2020 final official Ladies European Tour and Japan LPGA Tour career money lists, the top five money leaders

24. Special exemptions as selected by the USGA

Also exempt:

- Catherine Panton-Lewis

=== Qualifiers ===
Additional players qualified through sectional qualifying tournaments, which took place from June 15 to July 15, 2021, at 16 different sites across the United States.

Date	Location	Venue	Qualifiers
Jun 15	Gloucester, Massachusetts	Bass Rocks Golf Club	Danielle Lee (a), Susan Curtain (a)
Jun 22	Chesterfield, Virginia	Lake Chesdin Golf Club	Patricia Ehrhart (a), Amy Ellertson (a) (did not play), Nathalie Easterly (a)
Jun 30	Camarillo, California	Las Posas Country Club	Angela Buzminski, Akemi Nakata Khaiat (a) (did not play), Kathy Kurata (a), Sherry Wright (a), Regina Quintero (a), Kris Hanson
Jul 1	Orinda, California	Orinda Country Club	Dana Dormann, Lynne Cowan (a), Tina Barker (a), Kathryn Imrie, Cindy Mah-Lyford (did not play), Teresa Ishiguro
Jul 5	Denton, Texas	Wildhorse Golf Club	Kay Daniel (a), Julie Harrison (a), Janice Gibson, Missie McGeorge, Nancy Beck (a)
Jul 6	Cinnaminson, New Jersey	Riverton Country Club	Kathleen Ricci, Amy Kennedy (a), Jennifer Cully, Megan Grosky McGowan (a)
Jul 8	Atlanta, Georgia	Capital City Club	Laura Coble (a), Danielle Davis (a), Tonya Gill Danckaert
Jul 8	Blaine, Minnesota	TPC Twin Cities	Karen Weiss, Jane Noble
Jul 8	Hilliard, Ohio	Heritage Club	Martha Leach (a), Denise Callahan (a), Marlene Davis
Jul 12	Denver, Colorado	City Park Course	Janet Moore (a), Sherry Andonian-Smith, Corey Weworski (a)
Jul 12	Osprey, Florida	The Oaks Club	Caroline Gowan, Kathy Glennon (a), Laurel Kean, Gigi Higgins (a), Carolyn Barnett-Howe, Susan Cohn (a), Justina Hopkins
Jul 12	Woodburn, Oregon	The Oga Golf Course	Debby King, Dana Ebster
Jul 13	Midlothian, Illinois	Midlothian Country Club	Ellen Port (a), Nicole Jeray, Kasumi Takahashi, Robin W. Donnelley (a), Sidney Wells (a)
Jul 15	Salisbury, North Carolina	Country Club of Salisbury	Sarah Ingram (a), Kimberly Williams, Sue Ginter
Jul 15	Greenwich, Connecticut	Greenwich Country Club	Missie Berteotti, Michelle Dobek, Leela Narang-Benaderet (a), Kelley Brooke, Cheryl Anderson, Julie Piers
Jul 15	Mesa, Arizona	Longbow Club	Charlene Carson, Dina Ammaccapane, Kristal Parker

== Results ==
The championship was won by 50-year-old Annika Sörenstam, Sweden, playing in her first U.S. Senior Women's Open, with a score of 276, eight strokes ahead of runner-up and fellow countrywoman Liselotte Neumann. Defending champion Helen Alfredsson, Sweden, finished tied seventh.

Ellen Port and Martha Leach finished low amateurs at tied 20th, each with a score of 6 over par 294.

=== Final leaderboard ===
Sunday, August 1, 2021

Place	Player	Score	To par	Money ($)
1	(Sweden) Annika Sörenstam	67-69-72-68=276	−12	180,000
2	(Sweden) Liselotte Neumann	70-69-71-74=284	−4	108,000
3	(England) Laura Davies	71-75-68-71=285	−3	68,977
4	(Scotland) Catriona Matthew	71-70-71-74=286	−2	43,970
4	(Japan) Yuko Saito	70-70-74-72=286	−2	43,970
6	(United States) Kris Tschetter	69-72-75-73=289	+1	35,338
T7	(Sweden) Helen Alfredsson	74-72-72-72=290	+2	28,876
T7	(United States) Christa Johnson	74-71-75-70=290	+2	28,876
T7	(United States) Kimberly Williams	72-72-74-72=290	+2	28,876
T10	(United States) Dana Ebster	67-74-76-74=291	+3	20,173
T10	(United States) Tammie Green	74-75-72-70=291	+3	20,173
T10	(United States) Suzy Green-Roebuck	71-74-75-71=291	+3	20,173
T10	(United States) Juli Inkster	73-74-72-72=291	+3	20,173
T10	(United States) Karen Weiss	77-70-76-68=291	+3	20,173
