= 2023 U.S. Senior Women's Open =

Golf tournament

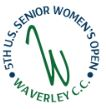

Tournament information
- Dates: August 24–27, 2023
- Location: Portland, Oregon, U.S. 45°27′8.51″N 122°39′12.49″W
- Course: Waverley Country Club
- Organized by: USGA
- Tour: Legends Tour
- Format: 72 holes stroke play

Statistics
- Par: 72
- Length: 6,114 yards (5,591 m)
- Field: 120 players, 51 after cut
- Cut: 152 (+8)
- Prize fund: $1,000,000
- Winner's share: $180,000

Champion
- (England) Trish Johnson
- 284 (−4)

Location map
- Location in the United States Location in Ohio Waverley CC (Portland, Oregon)

The 2023 U.S. Senior Women's Open took place August 24–27 at Waverley Country Club in Portland, Oregon, and was the fifth U.S. Senior Women's Open. It was a professional golf tournament organized by the United States Golf Association (USGA), open to women over 50 years of age and one of two yearly senior women's major golf championships.

Prize fund was, as of each of the previous four championships held, $1,000,000 with $180,000 going to the winner. All professionals who missed the cut were paid $2,000 each.

== Venue ==
The hosting club was established in 1896 and the year after moved to the east bank of the Willamette River, south of the Sellwood neighborhood of Portland. The 18-hole golf course was built in 1898, originally designed by Jack Moffat.

The club has previously hosted the U.S. Women's Amateur three times and the 2017 U.S. Senior Women's Amateur.

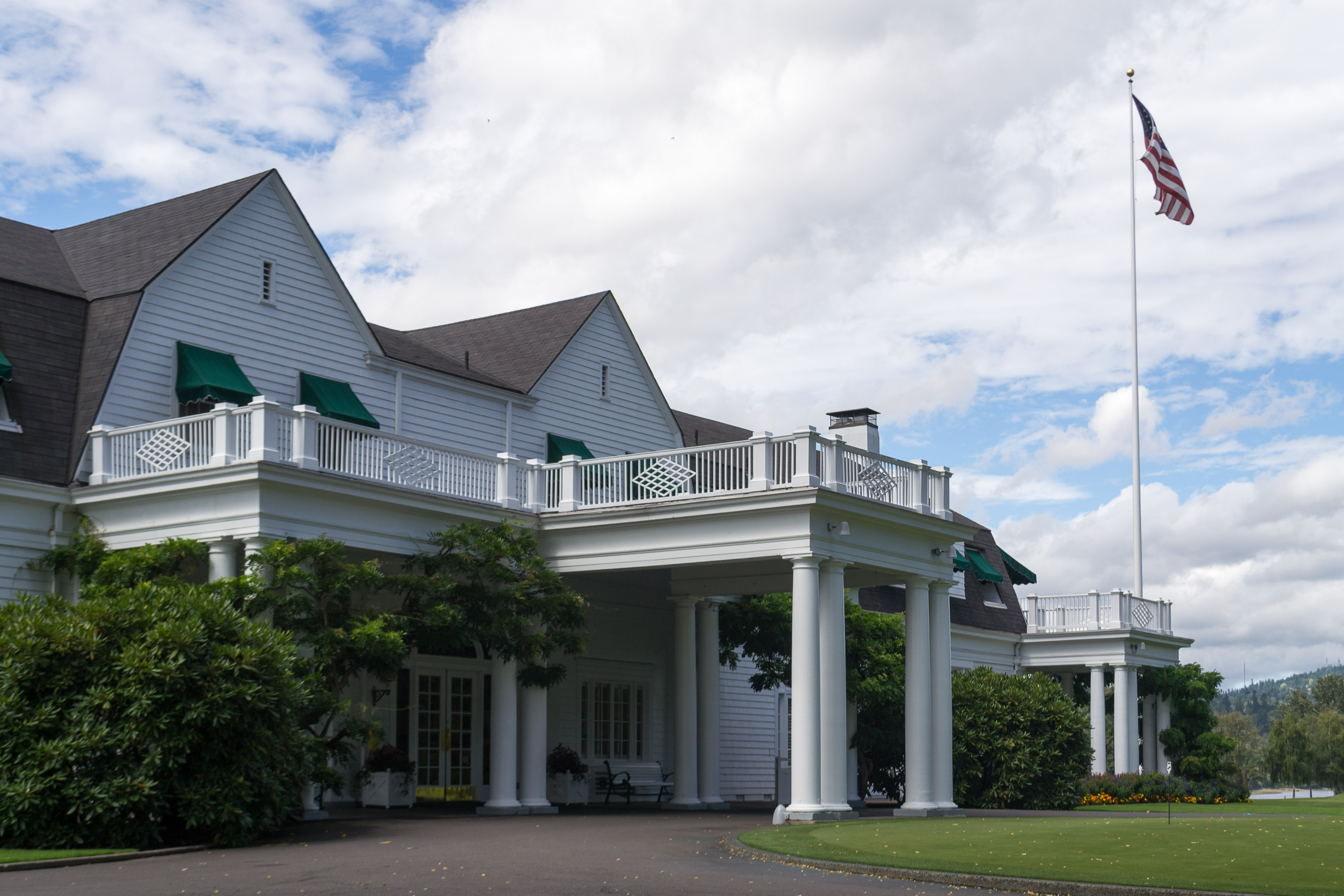
Clubhouse at Waverly Country Club

=== Course layout ===
The length was different between each round. Approximate length is shown.

Hole	Yards	Par	Hole	Yards	Par
1	330	4	10	371	4
2	349	4	11	140	3
3	361	4	12	372	4
4	395	4	13	500	5
5	463	5	14	132	3
6	156	3	15	344	4
7	365	4	16	198	3
8	528	5	17	495	5
9	124	3	18	499	5
Out	3,071	36	In	3,043	36
			Total	6,114	72

== Format ==
The walking-only tournament was played over 72 holes of stroke play, with the top 50 and ties making the 36-hole cut.

== Field ==
The championship was open to any professional or amateur golfer who was 50 years of age or over as of August 24, however restricted by a certain handicap level.

Players entered the competition, either exempt through some of several exemption categories or through sectional qualifying at different sites around United States in the summer of 2023. (Note: (a) – denotes amateur)

=== Exempt from qualifying ===
The following players were exempt from qualifying. Many players were exempt in multiple categories. Players are listed only once, in the first category in which they became exempt. Any additional criteria under which players were exempt is indicated in parentheses.

Each exemption category required players to have reached their 50th birthday on or before August 24, 2023.

Players eligible in categories with an upper age limit of 52, 54 or 59, were eligible regardless of age provided they were 50 or older, according to the exempt list published by the USGA on February 8, 2023, which included these elder players.

1. Former winners of the U.S. Senior Women's Open (10-year exemption)

Laura Davies (2,4,11,13,18,22), Helen Alfredsson (2,11,13,17), Annika Sörenstam (2,4,11,12,13,18,19,22), Jill McGill (2,6,13,14)

2. From the 2022 U.S. Senior Women's Open, the 20 lowest scorers and anyone tying for 20th place

Leta Lindley (12,13), Catriona Matthew (18, 21), Juli Inkster (4,12,13 14,18,19), Catrin Nilsmark (12,13), Liselotte Neumann (4,13), Michele Redman (12,13), Tammie Green (12,13,18), Trish Johnson (11,13,14), Stefania Croce, Pat Hurst (12,13,18), Patricia Ehrhart (a) (3), Lisa Grimes (13), Christa Johnson (12,13,18), Jackie Gallagher-Smith (13), Audra Burks, Jamie Fischer

3. From the 2022 U.S. Senior Women's Open, the amateur(s) returning the lowest 72-hole score

4. Winners of the U.S. Women's Open (10-year exemption)

JoAnne Carner, Hollis Stacy (18), Amy Alcott (18), Jane Geddes

Mary Mills (18), Betsy Rawls (18), Catherine Lacoste (7), Donna Caponi (18), Jerilyn Britz, Pat Bradley (18), Jan Stephenson (18), Kathy Baker Guadagnino, Betsy King (18), Kathy Cornelius, Murle Lindstrom, Sandra Haynie (18), Susie Berning (18), Sandra Palmer (18), Janet Alex Anderson, Meg Mallon (18), Patty Sheehan (18), Lauri Merten, Alison Nicholas did not play

5. From the 2022 and 2023 U.S. Women's Opens, any player returning a 72-hole score

6. Any professional or applicant for reinstatement who has won the U.S. Women's Amateur (three-year exemption)

Silvia Cavalleri (1997), Wendy Ward (1994)

Pearl Sinn (1988) did not play

7. Winners of the U.S. Women's Amateur (must be an amateur; five-year exemption)

Anne Sander (a), Carol Semple Thompson (a)

Mary Budke, Jean Ashley Crawford, Mary Lou Dill, Patricia Lesser Harbottle, Martha Kirouac, Barbara McIntire, Marlene Stewart Streit did not play

8. Winners of the 2021 and 2022 U.S. Senior Women's Amateur, and the 2022 runner-up (must be an amateur)

Lara Tennant (a), Shelley Stouffer (a), Sue Wooster (a)

9. Winners of the 2021 and 2022 U.S. Women's Mid-Amateur (must be an amateur)

10. Playing members of the two most recent United States and Great Britain & Ireland Curtis Cup teams, and the two most current United States Women's World Amateur teams (must be an amateur)

11. Winners of the 2017-2022 Senior LPGA Championship, and the 2021 and 2022 runners-up

12. From the 2022 Senior LPGA Championship, the 10 lowest scorers and anyone tying for 10th place

Lisa DePaulo (13), Jean Bartholomew (16)

Rosie Jones (13) did not play

13. From the final 2022 Legends Tour Performance Points list, the top 30 point leaders and ties

Barbara Moxness, Cathy Johnston-Forbes (18), Kris Tschetter, Kimberly Williams, Nicole Jeray, Michelle McGann, Maggie Will, Moira Dunn-Bohls, Becky Iverson, Susie Redman

14. Winners of the Legends Tour co-sponsored official individual events of minimum 36 holes in 2021, 2022 and 2023

15. Winners of the LPGA Teaching & Club Professional Championship (Championship Division) 2017–2022 and the five lowest scores and ties in 2022

Wendy Doolan did not play

16. From the 2022 LPGA Teaching & Club Professional Championship (Senior Division), the three lowest scores and ties

Sue Ginter, Donna Andrews (18)

17. Winners of the 2022 R&A Women's Senior Amateur and Canadian Women's Senior Amateur Championship (must be an amateur)

Shelly Stouffer (a), Terrill Samuel (a)

18. Winners of the following events when deemed a major by the LPGA Tour; Chevron Championship (1983–present); Evian Championship (2013–present); Women's British Open (2001–present); du Maurier Classic (1979–2000); KPMG Women's PGA Championship (1955–present); Titleholders Championship (1946–1966, 1972) or Women's Western Open (1930–1967). (10-year exemption)

Patricia Meunier-Lebouc, Brandie Burton

Karen Stupples, Jody Anschutz, Nanci Bowen, Betty Burfeindt, Beth Daniel, Gloria Ehret, Chako Higuchi, Judy Kimball, Jenny Lidback, Sally Little, Nancy Lopez, Alice Miller, Martha Nause, Dottie Pepper, Sandra Post, Kelly Robbins, Nancy Scranton, Sherri Steinhauer, Sherri Turner, Joyce Ziske did noy play

19. From the final 2022 LPGA Tour all-time money list, the top 10 players who are not otherwise exempt as of February 15, 2023

20. Winners of the LPGA Tour co-sponsored official events 2017–2023

21. Playing members of the five most recent United States and European Solheim Cup teams

22. From the 2022 final official Ladies European Tour and LPGA of Japan Tour career money lists, the top five money leaders

24. Special exemptions as selected by the USGA

=== Qualifying sites ===
Additional players qualified through sectional qualifying tournaments, taking place July 12 – August 10, 2023, at 16 different sites across the United States.

Date	Location	Venue	Qualifiers
Jul 12	Salisbury, North Carolina	Country Club of Salisbury	Pam Prescott (a), Lee Burton (a), Kathy Hartwiger (a), Kelly Cap, Denise Killeen, Lee Ann Walker
Jul 13	Diablo, California	Diablo Country Club	Sara Sanders, Jenny Park Choi, Eriko Gejo, Akiko Fukushima, Dana Ebster
Jul 20	Valrico, Florida	Buckhorn Springs Golf & Country Club	Barb Bunkowsky, Charlotta Sörenstam, Kim Keyer Scott (a), Shari Lindsey, Sally Dee, Laurel Kean, Laurie Rinker
Jul 20	Dobbs Ferry, New York	Ardsley Country Club	Cheryl Anderson, Kelley Brooke, Alicia Dibos
Jul 24	Portland, Oregon	Waverly Country Club	Ayumi Sobue, Nobuko Kizawa, Mikino Kubo, Rhonda Orr (a), Ellen Port (a)
Jul 27	Phoenix, Arizona	Papago Golf Course	Dina Ammaccapane, Yuko Saito, Corey Weworski (a)
Aug 1	Colorado Springs, Colorado	Eisenhower Golf Club (Blue Course)	Kristine Franklin (a), Sherry Andoniansmith, Marilyn Hardy (a)
Aug 1	Hellertown, Pennsylvania	Steel Club	Yuko Ogura, Monica Pedano (a), Michelle Murphy, Karen Noble
Aug 2	Richmond, Virginia	Richmond Country Club	Mimi Hoffman (a), Andrea Miller (a)
Aug 3	Romeoville, Illinois	Mistwood Golf Club	Tracy Hanson, Maggie Leef (a), Lieschen Wienke, Cheryl Fox
Aug 3	North Dartmouth, Massachusetts	Allendale Country Club	Tara Joy-Connelly (a), Pamela Kuong (a), Judith Kyrinis (a), Laura Shanahan Rowe
Aug 7	Glendora, California	Glendora Country Club	Shelly Haywood (a), Sherry Wright (a), YuKa Shiroto, Eika Otake, Leslie Spalding, Miyuki Shimabukuro
Aug 8	Braselton, Georgia	The Legends at Chateau Elan	Tonya Gill Danckaert, Joan Delk, Sarah Gallagher, Caroline Blaylock
Aug 8	West St. Paul, Minnesota	Southview Country Club	Brenda Williams (a)
Aug 8	Garland, Texas	Firewheel Golf Park	Kelley Nittoli (a), Patricia Beliard, Martha Linscott (a), Mina Hardin (a)
Aug 10	Columbus, Ohio	York Golf Club	Martha Leach (a), Suzy Green Roebuck, Christine Lindsey

== Round summaries ==
=== First round ===
Thursday, August 24, 2023

Place	Player	Score	To par
T1	(Scotland) Catriona Matthew	69	−3
T1	(United States) Michelle McGann	69	−3
T3	(United States) Tammie Green	70	−2
T3	(United States) Kathy Hartwiger (a)	70	−2
5	(Australia) Sue Wooster (a)	71	−1
T6	(United States) Lisa DePaulo	72	E
T6	(United States) Dana Ebster	72	E
T6	(United States) Nicole Jeray	72	E
T6	(United States) Christa Johnson	72	E
T6	(United States) Leta Lindley	72	E

=== Second round ===
Friday, August 25, 2023

In the second round, Catriona Matthew shot a 1-under -par 71 to increase her lead after the first round to three strokes. 51 players, 42 professionals and nine amateurs, made the 36-hole cut, which came to be on eight over par. 2018 champion Laura Davies missed the cut, finishing at 12 over par.

Place	Player	Score	To par
1	(Scotland) Catriona Matthew	69-71=140	−4
2	(United States) Nicole Jeray	72-71=143	−1
3	(United States) Christa Johnson	72-72=144	E
T4	(United States) Moira Dunn	74-71=145	+1
T4	(United States) Tammie Green	70-75=145	+1
T4	(England) Trish Johnson	73-72=145	+1
T4	(Sweden) Annika Sörenstam	74-71=145	+1
T8	(Sweden) Helen Alfredsson	73-73=146	+2
T8	(United States) Leta Lindley	72-74=146	+2
T8	(Japan) Yuko Saito	73-73=146	+2

=== Third round ===
Saturday, August 26, 2023

Place	Player	Score	To par
1	(England) Trish Johnson	73-72-67=212	−4
2	(Scotland) Catriona Matthew	69-71-73=213	−3
T3	(United States) Moira Dunn	74-71-69=214	−2
T3	(United States) Leta Lindley	72-74-68=214	−2
5	(United States) Nicole Jeray	72-71-72=215	−1
6	(United States) Tammie Green	70-75-71=216	E
7	(Sweden) Annika Sörenstam	74-71-72=217	+1
T8	(France) Patricia Meunier-Lebouc	74-75-69=218	+2
T8	(Sweden) Charlotta Sörenstam	75-72-71=218	+2
T10	(United States) Brandie Burton	73-74-72=219	+3
T10	(Italy) Silvia Cavalleri	77-73-69=219	+3
T10	(United States) Christa Johnson	72-72-75=219	+3
T10	(Canada) Judith Kyrinis (a)	74-73-72=219	+3

=== Final round ===
Sunday, August 27, 2023

Trish Johnson shot an even-par 72 in the final round, to hold on her lead after the third round and capture her first USGA title and third senior women's major championship. Defending champion Jill McGill finished tied 14th.

Place	Play	Score	To par	Money ($)
1	(England) Trish Johnson	73-72-67-72=284	−4	180,000
2	(United States) Leta Lindley	72-74-68-71=285	−3	108,000
3	(Scotland) Catriona Matthew	69-71-73-73=286	−2	69,648
T4	(United States) Moira Dunn	74-71-69-74=288	E	44,396
T4	(Sweden) Annika Sörenstam	74-71-72-71=288	E	44,396
T6	(Canada) Judith Kyrinis (a)	74-73-72-71=290	+2	–
T6	(France) Patricia Meunier-Lebouc	74-75-69-72=290	+2	35,680
8	(United States) Tammie Green	70-75-71-72=291	+3	32,316
T9	(United States) Jean Bartholomew	74-75-75-69=293	+5	28,952
T9	(Canada) Terrill Samuel (a)	73-75-73-72=293	+5	–
