= 2019 U.S. Senior Women's Open =

Golf tournament

Tournament information
- Dates: May 16–19, 2021
- Location: Southern Pines, North Carolina, U.S. 35.1970°N 79.3921°W
- Course: Pine Needles Lodge and Golf Club
- Organized by: USGA
- Tour: Legends Tour
- Format: 72 holes stroke play

Statistics
- Par: 71
- Length: Round 1: 5,912 yards (5,406 m); Round 2: 5.822 yards (5.324 m); Round 3: 5,764 yards (5,271 m); Round 4: 5,812 yards (5,314 m)
- Field: 120 players, 51 after cut
- Cut: 158 (+8)
- Prize fund: $1,000,000
- Winner's share: $180,000

Champion
- (Sweden) Helen Alfredsson
- 285 (+1)

Location map
- Location in the United States Location in North Carolina

The 2019 U.S. Senior Women's Open was the second U.S. Senior Women's Open. It was a professional golf tournament organized by the United States Golf Association, open to women over 50 years of age. The championship was played at the Pine Needles Lodge and Golf Club, Southern Pines, North Carolina, United States, from May 16 to 19. The championship was won by Helen Alfredsson.

== Venue ==
The hosting club had previously hosted the 1996, 2001 and 2007 U.S. Women's Opens. The club's golf course was designed by Donald Ross.

=== Course layout ===
The final length came to differ between each round. Fourth round length is shown.

| Hole | Yards | Par | Hole | Yards | Par |
|---|---|---|---|---|---|
| 1 | 459 | 5 | 10 | 462 | 5 |
| 2 | 372 | 4 | 11 | 330 | 4 |
| 3 | 131 | 3 | 12 | 333 | 4 |
| 4 | 320 | 4 | 13 | 139 | 3 |
| 5 | 171 | 3 | 14 | 355 | 4 |
| 6 | 381 | 4 | 15 | 478 | 5 |
| 7 | 342 | 4 | 16 | 112 | 3 |
| 8 | 313 | 4 | 17 | 373 | 4 |
| 9 | 351 | 4 | 18 | 390 | 4 |
| Out | 2,840 | 35 | In | 2,972 | 36 |
| | | | Total | 5,812 | 71 |

== Format ==
The walking-only tournament was played over 72 holes of stroke play, with the top 50 and ties making the 36-hole cut.

== Field ==
The championship was open to any professional or amateur golfer who was age 50 years or over as of May 16, however restricted by a certain handicap level. 352 players entered the competition, either exempt through some of several exemption categories or entering sectional qualifying at sites nationwide in the spring of 2019.

The final field of 120 players, consisting of 88 professionals and 32 amateurs, included 51 exempt players, while 69 players earned their spots in the field via qualifying.

=== Exempt from qualifying ===
Many players were exempt in multiple categories. Players are listed only once, in the first category in which they became exempt. (Note: (a) – denotes amateur) (Note: Players in italics did not play.)

1. Winner of the 2018 U.S. Senior Women's Open Championship

- Laura Davies

2. From the 2018 U.S. Senior Women's Open Championship, the 20 lowest scorers and anyone tying for 20th place

- Helen Alfredsson
- Danielle Ammaccapane
- Alicia Dibos
- Jamie Fischer
- Tammie Green-Parker
- Juli Inkster
- Trish Johnson
- Cathy Johnston-Forbes
- Martha Leach (a)
- Marilyn Lovander
- Laurel Kean
- Barbara Moxness
- Barb Mucha
- Liselotte Neumann
- Michele Redman
- Susie Redman
- Suzy Green-Roebuck
- Yuko Saito
- Rosie Jones did not play.

3. From the 2018 U.S. Senior Women's Open Championship, the amateur returning the lowest 72-hole score

4. Winners of the U.S. Women's Open Championship who reached their 50th birthday on or before May 16, 2019 (ten year exemption (Note: For the first three editions of the championship (2018–2021), players eligible in categories that required them to be 50 to 52, 54 or 59, were eligible regardless of age provided they were 50 or older.))

- Amy Alcott
- JoAnne Gunderson Carner
- Jane Geddes
- Hollis Stacy
- Jan Stephenson
- Janet Alex Anderson, Kathy Baker Guadagnino, Susie Berning, Pat Bradley, Murie Breer Lindstrom, Jerilyn Britz, Donna Caponi, Kathy Cornelius, Sandra Haynie, Betsy King, Catherine Lacoste, Meg Mallon, Laurie Merten, Alison Nicholas, Sandra Palmer, Betsy Rawls, Patty Sheehan and Mickey Wright did not play.

5. Any professional or applicant for reinstatement who has won the U.S. Women's Amateur Championship (three year exemption)

- Laura Baugh
- Kay Cockerill
- Joanne Foreman
- Amy Fruhwirth
- Carolyn Hill
- Jean Ashley Crawford, Beth Daniel, Mary Lou Dill, Cindy Hill, Donna Horton White, Deb Richard, Cathy Sherk and Pearl Sinn did not play.

6. Winners of the U.S. Women's Amateur Championship who reached their 50th birthday on or before May 16, 2019 (must be an amateur) (five year exemption)

- Mary Budke, Martha Kirouac, Patricia Lesser Harbottle, Barbara McIntire, Anne Quast Sander, Marlene Stewart Streit, and Carol Semple Thompson did not play.

7. Winners of the following events when deemed a major* by the LPGA Tour and who reached their 50th birthday on or before May 16, 2019. ANA Inspiration (1983-present), Evian Championship (2013–present), AIG Women's British Open (2019-), Ricoh Women's British Open (2001–2018), du Maurier Classic (1979-2000), KPMG Women's PGA Championship (1955-present), Titleholders Championship (1946. 1966 & 1972) or Western Open (1930-1967) (ten year exemption)

- Donna Andrews
- Nanci Bowen
- Christa Johnson
- Jenny Lidback
- Alice Miller
- Martha Nause
- Nancy Scranton
- Jody Rosenthal Anschutz, Betty Burfeindt, Gloria Ehret, Shirley Englehorn, Marlene Hagge, Chako Higuchi, Judy Kimball Simon, Nancy Lopez, Mary Mills, Pat O'Sullivan Lucey, Dottie Pepper, Sandra Post, Kelly Robbins, Marilynn Smith, Sherri Steinhauer, Sherri Turner, Kathy Whitworth, and Joyce Ziske did not play.

8. From the final 2018 LPGA Tour all-time money list, age-eligible players from the top 150 or money leaders and ties

- Wendy Doolan
- Lorie Kane
- Val Skinner
- Kris Tschetter

9. Winners of the LPGA Teaching & Club Professional Championship (Championship Division) the last five years (2014-2018) and the five lowest scorers and ties from the most recent Championship (2018)

- Jean Bartholomew
- Lisa Grimes
- Laurie Rinker

10. From the 2018 LPGA Teaching & Club Professional Championship (Senior Division), the three lowest scorers and ties

11. Winners of LPGA Tour co-sponsored events, whose victories are considered official, in the last five calendar years (2014-2018) and during the current calendar year to the initiation of the 2019 U.S. Senior Women's Open Championship

12. From the 2018 final official Ladies European Tour and LPGA of Japan Tour Career Money lists, the top five money leaders

13. Playing members of the five most current United States and European Solheim Cup Teams

14. From the 2018 Senior LPGA Championship, the 10 lowest scorers and anyone tying for 10th place

15. Winners and runners-up of the Senior LPGA Championship the last two years (2017-2018)

16. From the final 2017 and 2018 official Legends Tour Performance Points list, the top 30 point leaders and ties

- Barb Bunkowski
- Jane Crafter
- Cindy Figg-Currier
- Becky Iverson
- Maggie Will

17. Winners of the Legends Tour co-sponsored events, excluding team events, whose victories are considered official, in the last two calendar years (2017 & 2018) and during the current calendar year to the initiation of the current year's U.S. Senior Women's Open Championship

18. Winners of the U.S. Senior Women's Amateur Championship the last two years (2017 & 2018) and the 2018 runner-up (must be an amateur)

- Judith Kyrinis (a)
- Lara Tennant (a)
- Sue Wooster (a)

19. Winners of the 2017 and 2018 U.S. Women's Mid-Amateur Championship (must be an amateur)

20. Playing members of the two most current United States and Great Britain & Ireland Curtis Cup Teams and the two most current United States Women's World Amateur Teams (must be an amateur)

21. Winners of the 2018 R&A Women's Senior Amateur and Canadian Women's Senior Amateur Championships (must be an amateur)

22. Special exemptions as selected by the USGA

=== Qualifiers ===
Additional players qualified through sectional qualifying tournaments, which took place from April 17 to 30, 2019, at 17 different sites across the United States.

| Date | Location | Venue | Qualifiers |
|---|---|---|---|
| Apr 17 | San Antonio, Texas | San Antonio Country Club | Kelley Nittoli (a), Missie McGeorge, Julie Harrison (a), Marilyn Hardy (a) |
| Apr 17 | Mattapoisett, Massachusetts | Bay Club at Mattapoisett | Pamela Johnson, Laura Shanahan Rowe, Susan Bond-Philo, Catherine Panton-Lewis (did not play), Marie Therese Torti (a), Marjorie Jones |
| Apr 17 | Alexandria, Virginia | Belle Haven Country Club | Kaori Shimura, Joy Bonhurst, Lisa McGill (a), Anne Marie Palli |
| Apr 22 | Columbus, Ohio | Columbus Country Club | Nodjya Cook, Mary Ann Hayward (a), Marlene Davis |
| Apr 23 | Swainton, New Jersey | Union League National Country Club | Kammy Maxfeldt |
| Apr 23 | Sun City West, Arizona | Briarwood Country Club | Dina Ammaccapane, Leigh Klasse (a), Amy Ellertson (a), Nancy Harvey, Kim Eaton (a), Ronda Henderson (a) |
| Apr 23 | Rancho Mirage, California | Tamarisk Country Club | Sherry Andonian, Dede Cusimano, Amy Stubblefield, Dana Bates, Lisa DePaulo, Akemi Nakata Khaiat (a), Kathy Kurata (a), Leslie Spalding, Yumi Kubota |
| Apr 23 | Lakeland, Florida | The Club at Eaglebrooke | Cheryl Fox, Carolyn Barnett-Howe, Tama Caldabaugh (a), Susan Cohn (a), Sue Ginter, Jackie Gallagher-Smith, Pat Shriver, Jennifer Cully, Kim Keyer-Scott (a), Lorie Wilkes |
| Apr 23 | Atlanta, Georgia | Capital City Club at Brookhaven | Laura Coble (a), Brenda Pictor (a) |
| Apr 24 | Salisbury, North Carolina | Country Club of Salisbury | Patty Moore (a) (did not play), Kimberly Williams, Terrill Samuel (a), Sally Austin, Kim Briele (a) |
| Apr 24 | Nashville, Tennessee | Richland Country Club | Ellen Port (a), Susan West (a) |
| Apr 29 | Stanford, California | Stanford Golf Course | Dana Dormann (did not play), Sally Krueger (a), Kathryn Imrie, Marianne Towersey (a), Lynne Cowan (a) |
| Apr 29 | Tualatin, Oregon | Tualatin Country Club | Linda Bowman Segre (a), Leslie Folsom (a) |
| Apr 30 | Englewood, Colorado | Glenmoor Country Club | Sue Billek Nyhus, Kristine Franklin (a) |
| Apr 30 | North Caldwell, New Jersey | Green Brook Country Club | Julie Piers, Christine Reuss, Kelley Brooke, Cindy Reeves |
| Apr 30 | Medinah, Illinois | Medinah Country Club (Course No. 2) | Elaine Crosby, Audra Burks, Hui Chong Dofflemyer (a) |
| Apr 30 | Edina, Minnesota | Edina Country Club | Karen Weiss |

== Results ==
The championship was won by 54-year-old Helen Alfredsson, Sweden, with a one over par score of 285, two strokes ahead of runners-up Juli Inkster, United States and Trish Johnson, England, on tied second place. Defending champion Laura Davies, England, finished tied ninth.

Alfredsson won both of the two senior ladies major championships in 2019, the U.S. Senior Women's Open and, five months later, the Senior LPGA Championship, completing the same "senior slam" as Laura Davies achieved in 2018.

Low amateurs were Sally Krueger, United States, and Judith Kyrinis, Canada, tied 29th, at 23-over-par 307.

=== Final leaderboard ===
Sunday, May 19, 2019

| Place | Player | Score | To par | Money (US$) |
|---|---|---|---|---|
| 1 | (Sweden) Helen Alfredsson | 75-69-69-72=285 | +1 | 180,000 |
| 2 | (United States) Juli Inkster | 78-68-71-70=287 | +3 | 88,423 |
| 2 | (England) Trish Johnson | 75-72-66-74=287 | +3 | 88,423 |
| 4 | (United States) Jane Crafter | 76-71-72-70=289 | +5 | 43,885 |
| 4 | (United States) Michele Redman | 77-72-72-68=289 | +5 | 43,885 |
| 6 | (United States) Nanci Bowen | 73-75-70-72=290 | +6 | 35,269 |
| T7 | (United States) Danielle Ammaccapane | 72-75-72-72=291 | +7 | 30,281 |
| T7 | (United States) Barbara Moxness | 73-74-74-70=291 | +7 | 30,281 |
| T9 | (England) Laura Davies | 75-70-74-73=292 | +8 | 24,789 |
| T9 | (United States) Lisa DePaulo | 74-72-74-72=292 | +8 | 24,789 |
