= Senior women's major golf championships =

Women's professional senior golf is for female players aged 45 or 50 and above. The leading women's senior tour is the U.S.-based Legends Tour, which was founded in 2000. It has established a roster of two major championships. On the Legends Tour, the minimum age is 45, although with the USGA instituting the new U.S. Senior Women's Open in 2018, it chose a minimum age of 50. Also, the U.S. Senior Women's Open is played over four rounds, whereas the Senior LPGA Championship is played over three rounds. A golfer's performances can be quite variable from one round to the next, so playing an extra round increases the likelihood that the tournament will be won by leading players.

In order of foundation, the senior women's majors are:

- Senior LPGA Championship – Founded in 2017 and organized by the LPGA, for players aged 45 or above
- U.S. Senior Women's Open – Founded in 2018 and organized by the United States Golf Association, for players aged 50 or above

== Senior women's major winners ==
In 2018, the first year with two majors for senior women, Laura Davies won both, and the following year Helen Alfredsson replicated the feat.

| Year | Senior LPGA Championship | U.S. Senior Women's Open |
|---|---|---|
| 2026 | (Sweden) Maria McBride | (Sweden) Maria McBride |
| 2025 | (United States) Cristie Kerr | (Wales) Becky Morgan |
| 2024 | (United States) Angela Stanford (2/2) | (United States) Leta Lindley |
| 2023 | (United States) Angela Stanford (1/2) | (England) Trish Johnson (3/3) |
| 2022 | (Australia) Karrie Webb | (United States) Jill McGill |
| 2021 | (England) Trish Johnson (2/3) | (Sweden) Annika Sörenstam |
| 2020 | Cancelled due to COVID-19 pandemic | |
| 2019 | (Sweden) Helen Alfredsson (1/2) | (Sweden) Helen Alfredsson (2/2) |
| 2018 | (England) Laura Davies (1/2) | (England) Laura Davies (2/2) |
| 2017 | (England) Trish Johnson (1/3) | —N/a |

== By country ==
Senior major championship winning golfers by country
| Country | Senior LPGA Championship | U.S. Senior Women's Open | Total |
|---|---|---|---|
| England | 3 | 2 | 5 |
| Sweden | 2 | 3 | 5 |
| United States | 3 | 2 | 5 |
| Australia | 1 | – | 1 |
| Wales | – | 1 | 1 |
