= 2019 in golf =

This article summarizes the highlights of professional and amateur golf in the year 2019.

== Men's professional golf ==
=== Major championships ===
- 11–14 April: Masters Tournament – Tiger Woods won by one stroke over Dustin Johnson, Brooks Koepka, and Xander Schauffele. It was his fifth Masters championship, his 15th major championship, and his 81st PGA Tour win.
- 16–19 May: PGA Championship – Brooks Koepka won by two strokes over Dustin Johnson for his second consecutive PGA Championship victory. He is the first player to simultaneously hold the last two titles of two different major championships (2017 and 2018 U.S. Open).
- 13–16 June: U.S. Open – Gary Woodland won by three strokes over two-time defending champion Koepka. It was his first major victory.
- 18–21 July: The Open Championship – Shane Lowry won by six strokes over Tommy Fleetwood for his first major championship.

=== World Golf Championships ===
- 21–24 February: WGC-Mexico Championship – Dustin Johnson won by five strokes over Rory McIlroy. It was his third WGC-Mexico Championship win and sixth WGC tournament win.
- 27–31 March: WGC-Dell Technologies Match Play – Kevin Kisner defeated Matt Kuchar, 3 & 2, in the championship match. It was his first WGC victory.
- 25–28 July: WGC-FedEx St. Jude Invitational – Brooks Koepka won by three strokes over Webb Simpson. It was his first WGC victory.
- 31 October – 3 November: WGC-HSBC Champions – Rory McIlroy won in a playoff over defending champion Xander Schauffele. McIlroy has now won three of the four WGC events.

=== FedEx Cup playoff events ===
- 8–11 August: The Northern Trust – Patrick Reed won by one stroke over Abraham Ancer and moved to second in the FedEx Cup rankings.
- 15–18 August: BMW Championship – Justin Thomas won by three strokes over Patrick Cantlay. His third round 61 set the course record. His win moved him top the top of the FedEx Cup rankings.
- 22–25 August: Tour Championship – Rory McIlroy won by four strokes over Xander Schauffele. McIlroy became the second two–time winner of the FedEx Cup.

=== Other leading PGA Tour events ===
- 14–17 March: The Players Championship – Rory McIlroy won by one stroke over Jim Furyk. He became the first golfer to win both the BMW PGA Championship and the Players Championship.

For a complete list of PGA Tour results see 2019 PGA Tour.

=== Leading European Tour events ===
- 19–22 September: BMW PGA Championship – Danny Willett won by three strokes over Jon Rahm.
- 21–24 November: DP World Tour Championship, Dubai – Jon Rahm won by one stroke over Tommy Fleetwood, also winning the Race to Dubai.

For a complete list of European Tour results see 2019 European Tour.

=== Team events ===
- 12–15 December: Presidents Cup – The U.S. team won, 16–14, for the eighth straight time.

=== Tour leaders ===
- PGA Tour – (United States) Brooks Koepka (US$9,684,006)
  - This total does not include FedEx Cup bonuses.
- European Tour – (Spain) Jon Rahm (5,898 points)
- Japan Golf Tour – Shugo Imahira (¥168,049,312)
- Asian Tour – (Thailand) Jazz Janewattananond (US$1,058,524)
- PGA Tour of Australasia – (New Zealand) Ryan Fox (A$307,925)
- Sunshine Tour – (South Africa) J. C. Ritchie (R 2,162,387) – 2019–20 season

=== Awards ===
- PGA Tour
  - FedEx Cup – (Northern Ireland) Rory McIlroy
  - PGA Player of the Year – (United States) Brooks Koepka
  - Player of the Year (Jack Nicklaus Trophy) – (Northern Ireland) Rory McIlroy
  - Leading money winner – (United States) Brooks Koepka
  - Vardon Trophy – (Northern Ireland) Rory McIlroy
  - Byron Nelson Award – (Northern Ireland) Rory McIlroy
  - Rookie of the Year (Arnold Palmer Award) – (South Korea) Im Sung-jae
  - Payne Stewart Award – (United States) Hale Irwin
- European Tour
  - Golfer of the Year – (Spain) Jon Rahm
  - Rookie of the Year – (Scotland) Robert MacIntyre
- Korn Ferry Tour
  - Player of the Year – (United States) Scottie Scheffler

=== Results from other tours ===
- 2019 Asian Tour
- 2019 PGA Tour of Australasia
- 2019 PGA Tour Canada
- 2019 Challenge Tour
- 2019 Japan Golf Tour
- 2019 PGA Tour Latinoamérica
- 2019–20 Sunshine Tour
- 2019 Korn Ferry Tour

=== Other happenings ===
- 6 January: Three tours were added to the Official World Golf Ranking: All Thailand Golf Tour, Professional Golf Tour of India, and Abema TV Tour.
- 6 January: Justin Rose regains the world number one ranking from Brooks Koepka.
- 28 January: It was announced that the 2019 Players Championship would include a $12.5 million purse, "the biggest prize professional golf has ever seen for a single tournament."
- 3 March: Dustin Johnson regains the world number one ranking from Justin Rose, one week after winning the WGC-Mexico Championship.
- 7 April: Rose regains the world number one ranking from Johnson.
- 14 April: Johnson returns to the number one ranking after finishing second at the Masters.
- 19 May: Brooks Koepka returns to the world number one ranking after winning the PGA Championship.
- 13 September: Kevin Chappell shot a 59 (11-under-par) in the second round of A Military Tribute at The Greenbrier. It was the 11th round under 60 in PGA Tour history.
- 28 October: Tiger Woods wins the Zozo Championship to tied Sam Snead for most wins on the PGA Tour with 82.

== Women's professional golf ==
=== LPGA majors ===
- 4–7 April: ANA Inspiration – Ko Jin-young won her first major by three strokes over Lee Mi-hyang.
- 30 May – 2 June: U.S. Women's Open – Lee Jeong-eun won her first major title by two strokes over a group of three players (Ryu So-yeon, Lexi Thompson, Angel Yin).
- 20–23 June: KPMG Women's PGA Championship – Australian Hannah Green won her first major (and first LPGA Tour event) by one stroke over defending champion Park Sung-hyun. It was the first wire-to-wire win at the Women's PGA Championship since Yani Tseng in 2011 and the first major win by an Australian since Karrie Webb at the 2006 Kraft Nabisco Championship.
- 25–28 July: The Evian Championship – Ko Jin-young won by two strokes over Shanshan Feng, Kim Hyo-joo, and Jennifer Kupcho. It was her second major championship of the year.
- 1–4 August: Women's British Open – Hinako Shibuno, of Japan, playing for the first time outside of her home country and in her first major, won by one stroke over American Lizette Salas.

=== Additional LPGA Tour events ===
- 21–24 November: CME Group Tour Championship – Kim Sei-young won by one stroke over Charley Hull.

For a complete list of LPGA Tour results, see 2019 LPGA Tour.
For a complete list of Ladies European Tour results see 2019 Ladies European Tour.

=== Team events ===
- 13–15 September: Solheim Cup – Team Europe won the Cup with a 14½–13½ victory over Team USA.

=== Money list leaders ===
- LPGA Tour – (South Korea) Ko Jin-young ($2,773,894)
- LPGA of Japan Tour – Ai Suzuki (¥160,189,665)
- Ladies European Tour – (Germany) Esther Henseleit (743.06 points)
- LPGA of Korea Tour – (South Korea) Choi Hye-jin (₩1,207,162,636)
- ALPG Tour – (Australia) Sarah Kemp (A$147,118, 2018/19 season)
- Symetra Tour – (France) Perrine Delacour (US$125,042)

=== Other tour results ===
- 2019 ALPG Tour
- 2019 LPGA of Japan Tour
- 2019 LPGA of Korea Tour
- 2019 Symetra Tour

=== Other happenings ===
- 4 March: Park Sung-hyun regains the world number one ranking from Ariya Jutanugarn after winning the HSBC Women's World Championship.
- 8 April: Ko Jin-young takes the world number one ranking after winning the ANA Inspiration.
- 1 July: Park regains the world number one ranking from Ko after winning the Walmart NW Arkansas Championship.
- 29 July: Ko Jin-young regains the world number one ranking after winning the Evian Championship.

== Senior men's professional golf ==
=== Senior majors ===
- 9–12 May: Regions Tradition – Steve Stricker won by six strokes over Billy Andrade, Paul Goydos, and David Toms. It is his first major championship.
- 23–26 May: Senior PGA Championship – Ken Tanigawa won his first major by one stroke over Scott McCarron.
- 27–30 June: U.S. Senior Open – Steve Stricker, playing in his first U.S. Senior Open, won by six strokes over Jerry Kelly and David Toms. It is his second major championship.
- 11–14 July: Senior Players Championship – Retief Goosen won his first senior major by two strokes over Jay Haas and Tim Petrovic.
- 25–28 July: Senior Open Championship – Bernhard Langer won by two strokes over Paul Broadhurst. It was his fourth Senior Open championship, his 11th senior major championship, and his 40th PGA Tour Champions win.

=== Charles Schwab Cup playoff events ===
- 18–20 October: Dominion Charity Classic – Miguel Ángel Jiménez won by two strokes over Tommy Tolles.
- 1–3 November: Invesco QQQ Championship – Colin Montgomerie won in a playoff over Bernhard Langer.
- 7–10 November: Charles Schwab Cup Championship – Jeff Maggert won in a playoff over Retief Goosen.

=== Full results ===
- 2019 PGA Tour Champions season
- 2019 European Senior Tour

=== Money list leaders ===
- PGA Tour Champions – (United States) Scott McCarron (US$2,534,090)
- European Senior Tour – (Wales) Phillip Price (2887.8 points)

=== Awards ===
- PGA Tour Champions
  - Charles Schwab Cup – (United States) Scott McCarron
  - Player of the Year – (United States) Scott McCarron
  - Rookie of the Year – (South Africa) Retief Goosen
  - Leading money winner (Arnold Palmer Award) – (United States) Scott McCarron
  - Lowest stroke average (Byron Nelson Award) – (South Africa) Retief Goosen

== Senior women's professional golf ==
Senior majors

- 16–19 May: U.S. Senior Women's Open – Helen Alfredsson won her first senior major by two strokes over Juli Inkster and Trish Johnson.
- 14–16 October: Senior LPGA Championship – Helen Alfredsson won by three strokes over Juli Inkster, completing the second straight senior women's Grand Slam after Laura Davies' inaugural in 2018.

== Amateur golf ==
- 17–20 January: Latin America Amateur Championship – Álvaro Ortiz won by two strokes over Luis Gagne. Ortiz had finished runner-up in the previous two Latin America Amateurs.
- 3–6 April: Augusta National Women's Amateur – Jennifer Kupcho won the inaugural event.
- 17–22 May: NCAA Division I Women's Golf Championships – María Fassi (Arkansas) took the individual title and Duke captured their seventh team title.
- 24–29 May: NCAA Division I Men's Golf Championships – Matthew Wolff (Oklahoma State) won the individual title and Stanford won its 9th team title.
- 11–15 June: The Women's Amateur Championship – Emily Toy defeated Amelia Garvey, 1 up in the final.
- 17–22 June: The Amateur Championship – James Sugrue defeated Euan Walker, 2 up, in the final.
- 26–29 June: European Amateur – Matti Schmid wins by three strokes over Euan Walker.
- 24–27 July: European Ladies Amateur Championship – Alice Hewson won in a playoff over Krista Junkkari.
- 5–11 August: U.S. Women's Amateur – Gabriela Ruffels became the first Australian to win the U.S. Women's Amateur with a 1 up victory over Albane Valenzuela.
- 12–18 August: U.S. Amateur – Andy Ogletree defeated John Augenstein, 2 and 1, in the final.
- 7–8 September: Walker Cup – The United States team won, 15½–10½.
- 26–29 September: Asia-Pacific Amateur Championship – Lin Yuxin of China won his second Asia-Pacific Amateur.

== Golf in multi-sport events ==
- 10–13 July: Pacific Games – New Caledonia swept the gold medals: men's individual (Dylan Benoit), women's individual (Emilie Ricaud), men's team and women's team.
- 8–11 August: Pan American Games – Fabrizio Zanotti of Paraguay took the men's gold medal in a playoff, American amateur Emilia Migliaccio took the women's gold medal and the American team (all amateurs) took the mixed team gold medal.
- 2–6 December: South Asian Games – Nepal took the men's individual (Subash Tamang) and team gold medals while Sri Lanka took the women's individual (Grace Yataeara) and team gold medals.
- 4–7 December: Southeast Asian Games – James Leow Kwang Aik of Singapore took the men's individual gold medal while Thailand won men's team gold. The Philippines took the women's gold medals with Bianca Pagdanganan taking the individual title.

== Deaths ==
- 1 February – Alice Dye (born 1927), American amateur golfer and golf course designer.
- 15 February – Gene Littler (born 1930), American professional golfer, U.S. Open winner (1961), member World Golf Hall of Fame.
- 7 March – Dan Jenkins (born 1928), American author and sportswriter and member of the World Golf Hall of Fame.
- 7 April – Arie Irawan (born 1990), Malaysian professional golfer who died during a PGA Tour China event.
- 9 April – Marilynn Smith (born 1929), American professional golfer, co-founder of LPGA, member of World Golf Hall of Fame.
- 3 June – Larry Beck (born 1939), American professional golfer, winner of the 1957 U.S. Junior Amateur.
- 5 June – Peter Toogood (born 1930), Australian amateur golfer, 1954 Australian Amateur winner.
- 15 July – Margaret Todd (born 1918), Canadian amateur golfer and member of the Canadian Golf Hall of Fame.
- 29 July – Mário Gonzalez (born 1922), Brazilian professional golfer who won the Brazil Open a record eight times.
- 1 August – Gordon Brand Jnr (born 1958), Scottish golfer who won eight times on the European Tour.
- 9 September – Brian Barnes (born 1945), Scottish professional golfer who won nine times on the European Tour.
- 6 November – Pat O'Sullivan (born 1926), American amateur golfer and winner of the 1951 Titleholders Championship.
- 6 December – Jo Ann Washam (born 1950), American professional golfer who won three times on the LPGA Tour.
- 31 December – Ernie Jones (born 1932), Irish professional golfer.
- 31 December – J. L. Lewis (born 1960), American professional golfer who won twice on the PGA Tour.

== Table of results ==
This table summarizes all the results referred to above in date order.

Dates	Tournament	Status or tour	Winner
17–20 Jan	Latin America Amateur Championship	Amateur men's individual tournament	(Mexico) Álvaro Ortiz
21–24 Feb	WGC-Mexico Championship	World Golf Championships	(United States) Dustin Johnson
14–17 Mar	The Players Championship	PGA Tour	(Northern Ireland) Rory McIlroy
27–31 Mar	WGC-Dell Technologies Match Play	World Golf Championships	(United States) Kevin Kisner
3–6 Apr	Augusta National Women's Amateur	Amateur women's individual tournament	(United States) Jennifer Kupcho
4–7 Apr	ANA Inspiration	LPGA major	(South Korea) Ko Jin-young
11–14 Apr	Masters Tournament	Men's major	(United States) Tiger Woods
9–12 May	Regions Tradition	Senior major	(United States) Steve Stricker
16–19 May	PGA Championship	Men's major	(United States) Brooks Koepka
17–22 May	NCAA Division I Women's Golf Championships	U.S. college championship	Duke / María Fassi
23–26 May	Senior PGA Championship	Senior major	(United States) Ken Tanigawa
24–29 May	NCAA Division I Men's Golf Championships	U.S. college championship	Stanford / Matthew Wolff
30 May – 2 Jun	U.S. Women's Open	LPGA major	(South Korea) Lee Jeong-eun
11–15 Jun	The Women's Amateur Championship	Amateur women's individual tournament	(England) Emily Toy
13–16 Jun	U.S. Open	Men's major	(United States) Gary Woodland
17–22 Jun	The Amateur Championship	Amateur men's individual tournament	(Republic of Ireland) James Sugrue
20–23 Jun	KPMG Women's PGA Championship	LPGA major	(Australia) Hannah Green
26–29 Jun	European Amateur	Amateur men's individual tournament	(Germany) Matti Schmid
27–30 Jun	U.S. Senior Open	Senior major	(United States) Steve Stricker
11–14 Jul	Bridgestone Senior Players Championship	Senior major	(South Africa) Retief Goosen
18–21 Jul	The Open Championship	Men's major	(Republic of Ireland) Shane Lowry
24–27 Jul	European Ladies Amateur Championship	Amateur women's individual tournament	(England) Alice Hewson
25–28 Jul	WGC-FedEx St. Jude Invitational	World Golf Championships	(United States) Brooks Koepka
25–28 Jul	The Evian Championship	LPGA Tour and Ladies European Tour major	(South Korea) Ko Jin-young
25–28 Jul	The Senior Open Championship	Senior major	(Germany) Bernhard Langer
1–4 Aug	AIG Women's British Open	LPGA Tour and Ladies European Tour major	(Japan) Hinako Shibuno
5–11 Aug	U.S. Women's Amateur	Amateur women's individual tournament	(Australia) Gabriela Ruffels
8–11 Aug	The Northern Trust	PGA Tour FedEx Cup playoff	(United States) Patrick Reed
12–18 Aug	U.S. Amateur	Amateur men's individual tournament	(United States) Andy Ogletree
15–18 Aug	BMW Championship	PGA Tour FedEx Cup playoff	(United States) Justin Thomas
22–25 Aug	The Tour Championship	PGA Tour FedEx Cup playoff	(Northern Ireland) Rory McIlroy
7–8 Sep	Walker Cup	Great Britain & Ireland v United States men's amateur team event	United States
13–15 Sep	Solheim Cup	Europe v United States women's professional team event	(European Union) Team Europe
19–22 Sep	BMW PGA Championship	European Tour	(England) Danny Willett
26–29 Sep	Asia-Pacific Amateur Championship	Amateur men's individual tournament	(China) Lin Yuxin
18–20 Oct	Dominion Charity Classic	PGA Tour Champions Charles Schwab Cup playoff	(Spain) Miguel Ángel Jiménez
31 Oct – 3 Nov	WGC-HSBC Champions	World Golf Championships	(Northern Ireland) Rory McIlroy
1–3 Nov	Invesco QQQ Championship	PGA Tour Champions Charles Schwab Cup playoff	(Scotland) Colin Montgomerie
7–10 Nov	Charles Schwab Cup Championship	PGA Tour Champions Charles Schwab Cup playoff	(United States) Jeff Maggert
21–24 Nov	DP World Tour Championship, Dubai	European Tour	(Spain) Jon Rahm
21–24 Nov	CME Group Tour Championship	LPGA Tour	(South Korea) Kim Sei-young
12–15 Dec	Presidents Cup	International team vs. United States team men's professional team event	(United States) U.S. team
