= 2018 U.S. Senior Women's Open =

Tournament information
- Dates: July 12–15, 2018
- Location: Wheaton, Illinois, U.S. 41.849°N 88.116°W
- Course: Chicago Golf Club
- Organized by: USGA

Statistics
- Par: 73
- Length: Round 1: 6,279 yards (5,742 m); Round 2: 6,277 yards (5,740 m); Round 3: 6,196 yards (5,666 m); Round 4: 6,178 yards (5,649 m)
- Field: 120 players, 55 after cut
- Cut: 158 (+12)
- Prize fund: $1.0 million
- Winner's share: $180,000

Champion
- (England) Laura Davies
- 276 (−16)

Location map
- Location in the United States Location in Illinois

The 2018 U.S. Senior Women's Open was the inaugural U.S. Senior Women's Open. It was a professional golf tournament organized by the United States Golf Association, open to women over 50 years of age. The championship was played at the Chicago Golf Club, Wheaton, Illinois, from July 12 to 15 and was won by Laura Davies, England.

== Venue ==
The 2018 U.S. Senior Women's Open was the 12th USGA Championship contested at Chicago Golf Club. The last previous championship contested here was the 2005 Walker Cup, when the U.S. team defeated Great Britain and Ireland by a single point. The club was one of the five founding members of the USGA. It was built in 1892, making it the oldest 18-hole course in the western hemisphere.

=== Course layout ===
Preliminary length is shown. The final length came to differ between each round.

| Hole | Name | Yards | Par | Hole | Name | Yards | Par |
|---|---|---|---|---|---|---|---|
| 1 | Valley | 374 | 4 | 10 | Short | 136 | 3 |
| 2 | Road | 445 | 5 | 11 | Dogleg | 354 | 4 |
| 3 | Biarittz | 167 | 3 | 12 | Punchbowl | 464 | 5 |
| 4 | Long | 478 | 5 | 13 | Eden | 148 | 3 |
| 5 | Leven | 325 | 4 | 14 | Cape | 347 | 4 |
| 6 | Pope's Nose | 320 | 4 | 15 | Ginger Beer | 321 | 4 |
| 7 | Redan | 153 | 3 | 16 | Raynor's Prize | 517 | 5 |
| 8 | Narrows | 346 | 4 | 17 | Double Plateau | 373 | 4 |
| 9 | Pond | 389 | 4 | 18 | Home | 425 | 5 |
| Out | | 2,997 | 36 | In | | 3,085 | 37 |
| | | | | Total | | 6,082 | 73 |

== Format ==
The walking-only tournament was played over 72 holes of stroke play, with the top 50 and ties making the 36-hole cut.

== Field ==
The championship was open to any professional or amateur golfer who was age 50 years or over as of July 12 and had a handicap index not exceeding 7.4. The final field of 120 players included 57 players exempt through one of the exemption categories listed below, while 63 players earned their spots in the field via sectional qualifying at sites nationwide in the spring of 2018.

=== Exempt from qualifying ===
Many players were exempt in multiple categories. Players are listed only once, in the first category in which they became exempt, with additional categories in parentheses () next to their names. (Note: (a) – denotes amateur) (Note: Players in italics did not play.)

1. Winners of the U.S. Women's Open (ten year exemption (Note: For the first three editions of the championship (2018–2021), players eligible in categories that required them to be 50 to 52, 54 or 59, were eligible regardless of age provided they were 50 or older.)).

- Amy Alcott (5,6)
- Pat Bradley (5,6)
- Jerilyn Britz
- Laura Davies (5,6,10,11,12)
- Jane Geddes (5,6)
- JoAnne Gunderson Carner (3,6)
- Juli Inkster (3,5,6,10,12,13)
- Betsy King (5,6,12)
- Murle Lindstrom
- Lauri Merten
- Liselotte Neumann (6,11,12,13)
- Alison Nicholas
- Sandra Palmer (5)
- Hollis Stacy (5,6,12)
- Jan Stephenson (5,6)
- Janet Alex Anderson, Kathy Baker Guadagnino, Susie Berning (5), Donna Caponi (5), Kathy Cornelius, Sandra Haynie (5), Catherine Lacoste (4), Meg Mallon (5,6), Betsy Rawls (5), Patty Sheehan (5,6) and Mickey Wright (5) did not play.

2. From the 2018 U.S. Women's Open, any player returning a 72-hole score.

3. Winners of the U.S. Women's Amateur who later turned professional (three year exemption).

- Laura Baugh
- Kay Cockerill
- Joanne Pacillo Foreman
- Carolyn Hill
- Jean Ashley Crawford, Beth Daniel (5,6), Mary Lou Dill, Cindy Hill (11), Donna Horton White, Deb Richard (6), Cathy Sherk and Pearl Sinn did not play.

4. Winners of the U.S. Women's Amateur who did not turn professional (five year exemption) and the 2017 runner-up.

- Mary Budke, Martha Kirouac, Patricia Lesser Harbottle, Barbara McIntire, Anne Quast Sander, Marlene Stewart Streit and Carol Semple Thompson did not play.

5. Winners of the other LPGA majors (ten year exemption). This includes Canadian Women's Open champions prior to 2000.

- Helen Alfredsson (6,10,11,12)
- Donna Andrews (6,12)
- Nanci Bowen
- Tammie Green (6)
- Christa Johnson (6)
- Cathy Johnston-Forbes (11)
- Jenny Lidback (12)
- Sally Little
- Alice Miller
- Martha Nause (11,12)
- Nancy Scranton (6)
- Jody Rosenthal Anschutz, Betty Burfeindt, Gloria Ehret, Shirley Englehorn, Marlene Hagge, Chako Higuchi, Judy Kimball Simon, Nancy Lopez (6), Mary Mills, Pat O'Sullivan Lucey, Dottie Pepper (6), Sandra Post, Kelly Robbins, Marilynn Smith, Sherri Steinhauer (6), Sherri Turner (6), Kathy Whitworth and Joyce Ziske did not play.

6. The top 150 money leaders from the 2017 LPGA Tour all-time money list.

- Kristi Albers
- Danielle Ammaccapane
- Judy Dickinson
- Rosie Jones (12)
- Lorie Kane (11,12,13)
- Hiromi Kobayashi
- Barb Mucha (11,12)
- Cindy Rarick
- Michele Redman (11,12)
- Kris Tschetter
- Tina Barrett, Dale Eggeling, Ayako Okamoto, Kim Saiki-Maloney, and Val Skinner (12) did not play.

7. Winners of the LPGA Teaching & Club Professionals Championship (last five years) and the top five finishers from the most recent Championship.

- Jean Bartholomew (11,12)
- Lisa Grimes (12)
- Laurie Rinker

8. Winners of official LPGA Tour events from the last five years and the current year.

9. Top five leaders of the 2017 Ladies European Tour and 2017 LPGA of Japan Tour career money lists.

10. Playing members of the last five Solheim Cup teams.

11. Low ten and ties from the 2017 Senior LPGA Championship.

- Trish Johnson (12,13)

12. Top 30 points leaders from the 2016 and 2017 Legends Tour Performance Points list.

- Jane Crafter
- Alicia Dibos
- Cindy Figg-Currier
- Becky Iverson
- Marilyn Lovander
- Barb Moxness

13. Winners of Legends Tour events from the last two years and the current year (36-hole minimum).

14. Winners of U.S. Senior Women's Amateur from the last two years and the 2017 runner-up.

- Judith Kyrinis
- Ellen Port
- Terrill Samuel

15. Winners of the 2016 and 2017 U.S. Women's Mid-Amateur.

16. Playing members of the two most current Curtis Cup and U.S. Espirito Santo Trophy teams.

17. Winner of the 2017 Ladies' Senior British Open Amateur and Canadian Women's Senior Amateur.

- Macarena Campomanes Eguiguren
- Sue Wooster

18. Special exemptions granted by the USGA.

- Jane Blalock
- Mary Jane Hiestand

=== Qualifiers ===
Additional players qualified through sectional qualifying tournaments which took place Jun 4–20 at sites across the United States.

| Date | Location | Venue | Qualifiers |
|---|---|---|---|
| Jun 4 | Mesa, Arizona | Alta Mesa Golf Club | Lori Atsedes, Anne Marie Palli, Yuko Saito, Liz Waynick (a) |
| Jun 4 | Newport Beach, California | Newport Beach Country Club | Akemi Nakata Khaiat (a), Kathy Kurata (a), Cindy McConnell (a), Evelyn Orley (a), MK Thanos-Zordani (a) |
| Jun 5 | Marietta, Georgia | Atlanta Country Club | Margaret Leef (a), Brenda Pictor (a) |
| Jun 6 | Southern Pines, North Carolina | Pine Needles Lodge & Golf Club | Sally Austin, Suzy Green-Roebuck, Luanne Cherney |
| Jun 6 | Springfield, Virginia | Springfield Golf & Country Club | Joy Bonhurst, Sofia Grönberg-Whitmore, Amy Ellertson (a) |
| Jun 12 | San Francisco, California | Olympic Club (Ocean Course) | Tina Barker (a), Dana Dormann, Kathryn Imrie, Suzy Whaley, Julie Wirth (a) |
| Jun 12 | Aurora, Colorado | Commonground Golf Course | Sherry Andonian-Smith, Patricia Beliard, Marilyn Hardy (a), Janet Moore (a) |
| Jun 12 | Eden Prairie, Minnesota | Bent Creek Golf Club | Leigh Klasse (a), Susan West (a) |
| Jun 12 | Armonk, New York | Whippoorwill Club | Angela Aulenti, Dana Bates, CJ Reeves, Maggie Will |
| Jun 14 | Middleton, Massachusetts | Ferncroft Country Club | Helene Chartrand (a), Catherine Panton-Lewis, Laura Shanahan Rowe |
| Jun 14 | Renton, Washington | Fairwood Golf & Country Club | Patricia Ehrhart (a), Debby King, Lara Tennant (a) |
| Jun 18 | Daytona Beach, Florida | LPGA International (Jones Course) | Barb Bunkowsky, Laura Carson (a), Laurel Kean, Therese Quinn (a), Nancy Taylor |
| Jun 18 | Lake Forest, Illinois | Conway Farms Golf Club | Elaine Crosby, Annette Deluca, Jamie Fischer, Eriko Gejo, Maureen Sheehan (a), Kaori Shimura |
| Jun 18 | Columbus, Ohio | Scioto Country Club | Missie Berteotti, Marlene Davis, Cheryl Fox, Martha Leach (a) |
| Jun 18 | Easton, Pennsylvania | Northampton Country Club | Debby Murphy, Janie Sirmons, Marie-Therese Torti (a), Holly Vaughn |
| Jun 18 | Austin, Texas | Onion Creek Club | Laurie Brower, Lisa DePaulo, Susie Kirk, Kelley Nittoli (a), Loretta Young |
| Jun 20 | Nashville, Tennessee | Richland Country Club | Sue Ginter, Suzanne Strudwick |

== Results ==
The championship was won by 54-year-old Laura Davies, England, with a 16 under par score of 276, 10 strokes ahead of runner-up Juli Inkster, United States.

Marta Leach, United States, finished law amateur tied 10th with a 6 over par score of 298.

Davies won both of the two senior ladies major championships in 2018, the U.S. Senior Women's Open and, three months later, the Senior LPGA Championship, completing the "senior slam".

=== Final leaderboard ===
Sunday, July 15, 2018

| Place | Player | Score | To par | Money (US$) |
|---|---|---|---|---|
| 1 | (England) Laura Davies | 71-71-66-68=276 | −16 | 180,000 |
| 2 | (United States) Juli Inkster | 73-72-68-73=286 | −6 | 108,000 |
| 3 | (England) Trish Johnson | 71-71-73-73=288 | −4 | 68,650 |
| 4 | (United States) Danielle Ammaccapane | 75-71-71-74=291 | −1 | 48,110 |
| 5 | (Japan) Yuko Saito | 76-71-73-74=294 | +2 | 40,071 |
| T6 | (Sweden) Helen Alfredsson | 72-79-73-71=295 | +3 | 33,782 |
| T6 | (Sweden) Liselotte Neumann | 71-76-76-72=295 | +3 | 33,782 |
| T8 | (United States) Tammie Green Parker | 76-75-79-67=297 | +5 | 26,192 |
| T8 | (United States) Rosie Jones | 77-73-71-76=297 | +5 | 26,192 |
| T10 | (United States) Suzy Green-Roebuck | 75-75-74-74=298 | +6 | 23,849 |
| T10 | (United States) Martha Leach (a) | 78-75-72-73=298 | +6 | 0 |
