= 2023 Legends Tour =

Women's golf series

The 2023 Legends of the LPGA is a series of professional golf tour events for women aged 45 and older sanctioned by the Legends Tour. Based in the United States, it is an offshoot of the main U.S.-based women's tour, the LPGA Tour. The tour was founded in 2001, and is intended to allow women to prolong their competitive golf careers on the model of the successful Champions Tour for men.

== Schedule and results ==
The table below shows the schedule of events for the 2023 Legends Tour season. The number in parentheses after each winner's name is the number of Legends Tour events she had won up to and including that tournament.

Date	Tournament	Location	Winner(s)	Note
Jul 1	Senior LPGA Championship	Indiana	(United States) Angela Stanford	
Jul 12	St Johns Challenge	Florida	(United States) Leta Lindley	
Aug 27	U.S. Senior Women's Open	Oregon	(England) Trish Johnson	
Sep 8	BJ's Charity Championship	Massachusetts	(France) Patricia Meunier-Lebouc & (United States) Jane Blalock	Team event
Sep 20	Infinity Invitational	Nevada	(Australia) Jan Stephenson & (Peru) Alicia Dibos & (United States) Pat Hurst & (United States) Alaina Schmitt	Unofficial event
Oct 11	Eagles Landing	Georgia	(United States) Angela Stanford	
Nov 8	Cove Cay Legends	Florida	(United States) Leta Lindley	
