= 2021 Legends Tour =

Women's golf series

The 2021 Legends Tour is a series of professional golf tour events for women aged 45 and older sanctioned by the Legends Tour. Based in the United States, it is an offshoot of the main U.S.-based women's tour, the LPGA Tour. The tour was founded in 2001, and is intended to allow women to prolong their competitive golf careers on the model of the successful Champions Tour for men.

== Schedule and results ==
The table below shows the schedule of events for the 2021 Legends Tour season. The number in parentheses after each winner's name is the number of Legends Tour events she had won up to and including that tournament.

Date	Tournament	Location	Winner(s)	Note
~~May 29~~	Suquamish Clearwater Legends Cup	Washington	Cancelled	
Aug 1	U.S. Senior Women's Open	Connecticut	(Sweden) Annika Sörenstam (1)	
Aug 7	Land O'Lakes Legends Classic	Minnesota	(United States) Juli Inkster (6)	
Aug 29	Senior LPGA Championship	Indiana	(England) Trish Johnson (5)	
Sep 10	BJ's Charity Championship	Massachusetts	(United States) Laura Diaz (1) & (Australia) Jan Stephenson (4)	
