= 2024 Legends Tour =

Women's golf series

The 2024 Legends of the LPGA is a series of professional golf tour events for women aged 45 (except for the U. S. Senior Women's Open, which has a minimum age of 50) and older sanctioned by the Legends Tour. Based in the United States, it is an offshoot of the main U.S.-based women's tour, the LPGA Tour. The tour was founded in 2001, and is intended to allow women to prolong their competitive golf careers on the model of the successful Champions Tour for men.

== Schedule and results ==
The table below shows the schedule of events for the 2024 Legends Tour season.

Key

Major championships
Regular events
Team championships

Date	Tournament	Location	Winner(s)	Note
Feb 20	PGA Championship Women's Stroke Play	Florida	(United States) Lisa Grimes	
May 1	Marilyn Smith Arizona Women's Open	Arizona	(United States) Leta Lindley & (United States) Jackie Gallagher-Smith	Team event
May 25	Senior LPGA Championship	Utah	(United States) Angela Stanford	
May 31	Texas Women's Open – Senior Division	Texas	(United States) Angela Stanford	
Jun 8	The Woodford Legends Invitational	Kentucky	(Wales) Becky Morgan & (Scotland) Catriona Matthew	Team event
Jul 14	Florida Women's Open – Senior Division	Florida	(United States) Tammie Green	
Jul 26	The Legends Return to Eagle's Landing	Georgia	(United States) Angela Stanford	
Jul 26	Tennessee Women's Open – Senior Division	Tennessee	(United States) Cheryl Fox	
Aug 4	U.S. Senior Women's Open	Pennsylvania	(United States) Leta Lindley	Minimum age 50
Aug 28	LPGA Professional's National Championship	Florida	(United States) Alexandra White	
Sep 1	South Carolina Women's Open – Senior Division	South Carolina	(United States) Yvonne Cox-Holmes	
Sep 6	BJ's Charity Championship	Massachusetts	(United States) Wendy Ward & (United States) Angela Stanford	Team event
Oct 30	Atlanta Legends Open	Georgia		
Nov 12	Cove Cay Invitational	Florida		
