= 2020 Legends Tour =

Women's golf series

The 2020 Legends Tour is a series of professional golf tour events for women aged 45 and older sanctioned by the Legends Tour. Based in the United States, it is an offshoot of the main U.S.-based women's tour, the LPGA Tour. The tour was founded in 2001, and is intended to allow women to prolong their competitive golf careers on the model of the successful Champions Tour for men.

== Schedule and results ==
The table below shows the schedule of events for the 2020 Legends Tour season. The number in brackets after each winner's name is the number of Legends Tour events she had won up to and including that tournament.

The two majors, the Senior LPGA Championship and the U.S. Senior Women's Open, were cancelled due to COVID-19 pandemic

Date	Tournament	Location	Winner(s)	Note
Aug 26–27	CT Women's Open	Connecticut		
Sep 11	BJ's Charity Championship	Massachusetts		
Sep 14–15	Legends on Grey Lady	Massachusetts		Team event
Sep 21–23	Legends at Bethpage	New York		
