= 2018 Legends Tour =

The 2018 Legends Tour is a series of professional golf tour events for women aged 45 and older sanctioned by the Legends Tour. Based in the United States, it is an offshoot of the main U.S.-based women's tour, the LPGA Tour. The tour was founded in 2001, and is intended to allow women to prolong their competitive golf careers on the model of the successful Champions Tour for men.

== Schedule and results ==
The table below shows the schedule of events for the 2018 Legends Tour season. The number in brackets after each winner's name is the number of Legends Tour events she had won up to and including that tournament.

Date	Tournament	Location	Winner(s)	Note
Mar 25	ANA Inspiration Legends Day	California	(Sweden) Liselotte Neumann (4)	
Jun 10	Suquamish Clearwater Legends Cup	Washington	(England) Trish Johnson (3)	
Jul 15	U.S. Senior Women's Open	Illinois	(England) Laura Davies (2)	Inaugural USGA National Championship
Aug 6	Wendy's Charity Classic	Michigan	(Canada) Lorie Kane (5)	
Sep 7	BJ's Charity Championship	Massachusetts	(England) Laura Davies (3) & (England) Trish Johnson (4)	
Sep 9	Legends on Grey Lady	Massachusetts	(United States) Nancy Lopez (England) Laura Davies (United States) Allison Finney (United States) Pat Hurst	
Oct 17	Senior LPGA Championship	Indiana	(England) Laura Davies (4)	
