= 2019 Legends Tour =

Women's golf series

The 2019 Legends Tour is a series of professional golf tour events for women aged 45 and older sanctioned by the Legends Tour. Based in the United States, it is an offshoot of the main U.S.-based women's tour, the LPGA Tour. The tour was founded in 2001 and is intended to allow women to prolong their competitive golf careers on the model of the successful Champions Tour for men.

== Schedule and results ==
The table below shows the schedule of events for the 2019 Legends Tour season. The number in brackets after each winner's name is the number of Legends Tour events she had won up to and including that tournament.

| Date | Tournament | Location | Winner(s) | Note |
|---|---|---|---|---|
| Mar 31–Apr 1 | ANA Inspiration Legends Day | California | (United States) Amy Alcott (1) | |
| May 17–19 | U.S. Senior Women's Open | North Carolina | (Sweden) Helen Alfredsson (1) | |
| Jun 7–8 | Suquamish Clearwater Legends Cup | Washington | (United States) Juli Inkster (5) | |
| Jul 26–27 | Corning Legends Invitational | New York | | |
| Aug 4 | Janesville LPGA Senior Pro-Am | Wisconsin | (United States) Christa Johnson (5) | |
| Sep 5–6 | BJ's Charity Championship | Massachusetts | (United States) Rosie Jones (9) & (United States) Michele Redman (3) | |
| Sep 7–8 | Legends on Grey Lady | Massachusetts | | Team event |
| Oct 14–16 | Senior LPGA Championship | Indiana | (Sweden) Helen Alfredsson (2) | |
