= Major golf championship =

Major golf championship may refer to:

- Men's major golf championships
- Women's major golf championships
- Senior major golf championships
- Senior women's major golf championships
