= 2022 Legends Tour =

Women's golf series

The 2022 Legends of the LPGA is a series of professional golf tour events for women aged 45 and older sanctioned by the Legends Tour. Based in the United States, it is an offshoot of the main U.S.-based women's tour, the LPGA Tour. The tour was founded in 2001, and is intended to allow women to prolong their competitive golf careers on the model of the successful Champions Tour for men.

== Schedule and results ==
The table below shows the schedule of events for the 2022 Legends Tour season. The number in parentheses after each winner's name is the number of Legends Tour events she had won up to and including that tournament.

Date	Tournament	Location	Winner(s)	Note
Jun 6	FirstHealth SEI Elevating the Dream Pro-Am	North Carolina		
Jun 7	Legends Tour Challenge	North Carolina	(United States) Jackie Gallagher-Smith	
Jul 24	Senior LPGA Championship	Kansas	(Australia) Karrie Webb	
Aug 14	Land O'Lakes Legends Classic	Minnesota	(United States) Juli Inkster	
Aug 28	U.S. Senior Women's Open	Ohio	(United States) Jill McGill	
Sep 9	BJ's Charity Championship	Massachusetts	(United States) Pat Bradley & (United States) Jamie Fischer	Team event
