= Grand China Air LPGA =

Golf tournament formerly on the LPGA Tour

The Grand China Air LPGA was a golf tournament on the American LPGA Tour and was the first LPGA event to be played in China. The event was played in Haikou, China. For purposes of qualification for the season-ending LPGA Playoffs at The ADT, it was a "standard" event, which means that players earn points toward the playoffs, but the winner does not receive an automatic playoff spot.

The title sponsor was Grand China Air, a Beijing-based airline founded in 2007.

The inaugural event was played in 2008, at the Haikou West Golf Club. The tournament was to be played a minimum of three years but was played only in 2008.

== Winners ==
Year	Dates	Champion	Country	Score	Purse	Winner's Share
2008	Oct 24–26	Helen Alfredsson	Sweden	204 (–12)	$1,800,000	$270,000

== Tournament record ==
Year	Player	Score	Round
2008	Laura Diaz	63 (–9)	1st
