= Pine Needles Lodge and Golf Club =

Golf club in North Carolina, US

Coordinates: 35.1970°N 79.3921°W

The Pine Needles Lodge and Golf Club is a country club in Southern Pines, North Carolina. The club's golf course was designed by Donald Ross.

The club hosted the U.S. Women's Open in 1996, 2001, 2007, and 2022, and staged the last Titleholders Championship in 1972. Those tournaments were won by Annika Sörenstam, Karrie Webb, Cristie Kerr, Minjee Lee, and Sandra Palmer respectively. It hosted the 1991 U.S. Senior Women's Amateur, won by Phyllis Preuss and hosted the 2019 U.S. Senior Women's Open, won by Helen Alfredsson.
