= Firewheel Golf Park =

Public golf course in Garland, Texas, US

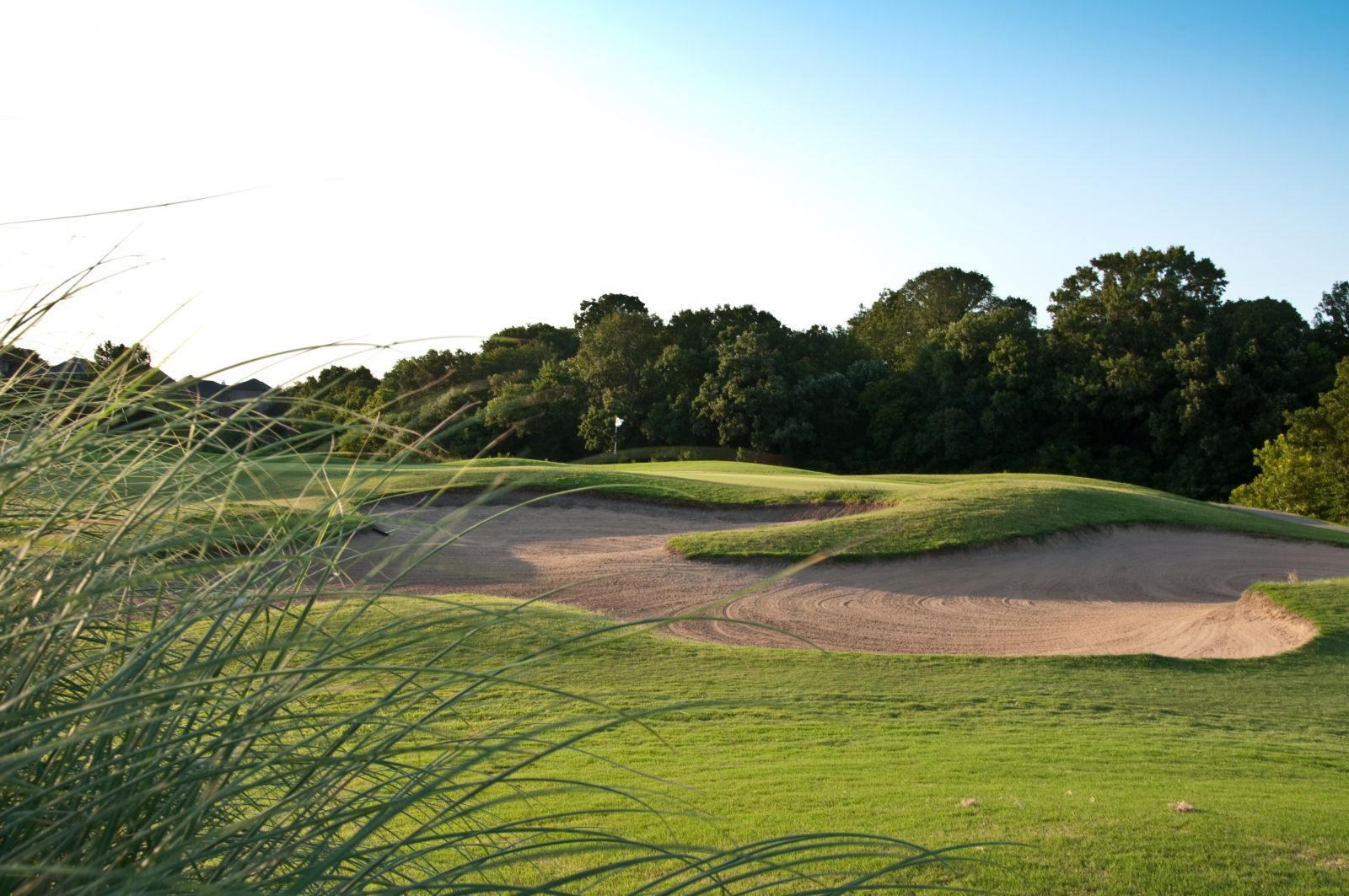
Firewheel Golf Park

Firewheel Golf Park is a public golf course located in Garland, Texas. It is a regular host of the North Texas PGA Junior Championships and many other tournaments.

The section of Garland, Texas called Firewheel was created after this public golf course. Firewheel Town Center and many of the neighborhoods were built up around this golf course.

== History ==
The Firewheel Golf Park golf course was built in 1983.
