= 2017 Legends Tour =

The 2017 Legends Tour is a series of professional golf tour events for women aged 45 and older sanctioned by the Legends Tour. Based in the United States, it is an offshoot of the main U.S.-based women's tour, the LPGA Tour. The tour was founded in 2001, and is intended to allow women to prolong their competitive golf careers on the model of the successful Champions Tour for men.

== Schedule and results ==
The table below shows the schedule of events for the 2017 Legends Tour season. The number in brackets after each winner's name is the number of Legends Tour events she had won up to and including that tournament.

Date	Tournament	Location	Winner(s)	Note
Mar 5	Walgreens Charity Classic	Arizona	(United States) Juli Inkster (4)	
Mar 26	ANA Inspiration Legends Day	California		
May 21	Red Nose Day Walgreens Championship	Wisconsin	(Sweden) Liselotte Neumann (3)	
Jul 12	Senior LPGA Championship	Indiana	(England) Trish Johnson (2)	Inaugural LPGA Championship
Aug 14	Wendy's Charity Classic	Michigan	(United States) Rosie Jones (8)	
Sep 7	BJ's Charity Pro-Am	Massachusetts		
Sep 8	BJ's Charity Championship	Massachusetts	(United States) Patti Rizzo (United States) Michele Redman (3)	
