= Trish Johnson =

English professional golfer (born 1966)

Trish Johnson MBE
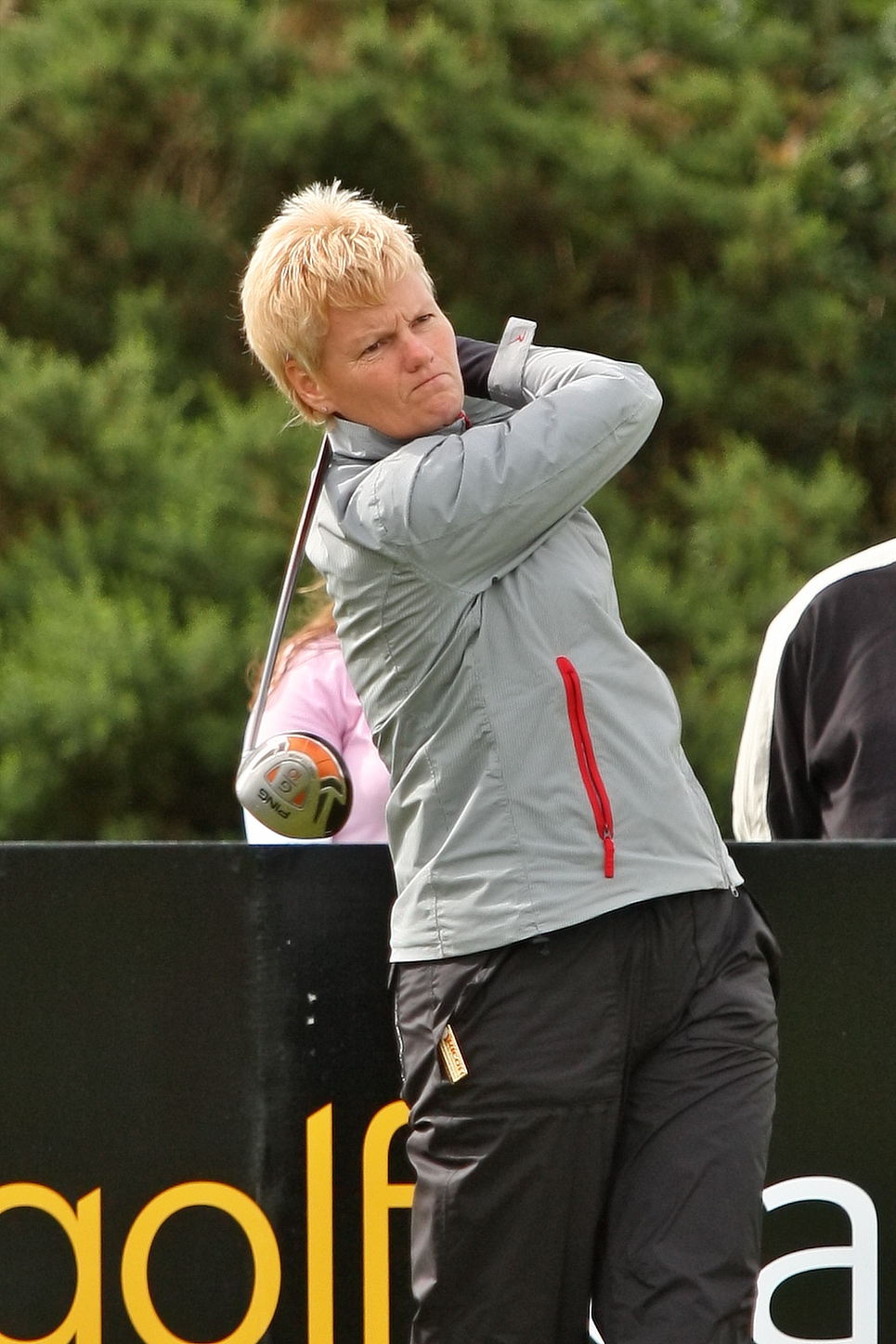
- Johnson during 2010 Women's British Open

Personal information
- Full name: Patricia Mary Johnson
- Nationality: England
- Born: 17 January 1966 (age 60) Bristol, England
- Height: 1.79 m (5 ft 10 in)

Career
- Sport: Golf
- Turned professional: 1987
- Current tour: Legends Tour
- Former tours: Ladies European Tour; LPGA Tour
- Professional wins: 29

Number of wins by tour
- LPGA Tour: 3
- Ladies European Tour: 19 (T3rd all-time)
- Other: 1 (regular); 6 (senior)

Best results in LPGA major championships
- Chevron Championship: T8: 1993
- Women's PGA C'ship: 8th/T8: 1993, 1997
- U.S. Women's Open: 10th: 1998
- du Maurier Classic: T3: 1991
- Women's British Open: T19: 2001
- Evian Championship: CUT: 2014

Achievements and awards
- Ladies European Tour Rookie of the Year: 1987
- Ladies European Tour Order of Merit: 1990

Patricia Mary "Trish" Johnson MBE (born 17 January 1966) is an English professional golfer. She won three times on the LPGA Tour and 19 times on the Ladies European Tour. As a senior she has won both senior women's major championships, the U.S. Senior Women's Open and the Senior LPGA Championship.

== Early life ==
Johnson was born in Bristol, South West England, United Kingdom. Her father and her three brothers were all golfers, one of them was a professional golfer. She practiced other sports, including badminton, soccer and tennis, but took up golf at age nine influenced by her family, playing at Royal North Devon Golf Club, a links course and the oldest golf club in England. She preferred to learn by herself rather than taking golf lessons.

== Amateur career ==
She was South Western Champion in 1983 and 1984. In 1984 she was both England Under-23 and Under-21 Champion. In 1985 she won the English Women's Amateur Championship, was the English Women's Strokeplay Champion and repeated as England Under-23 Champion. In 1986 she represented Great Britain and Ireland in the Espirito Santo Trophy World Amateur Golf Team Championships and the Curtis Cup. At the 1986 Curtis Cup match, on foreign soil at Prairie Dunes Country Club in Hutchinson, Kansas, her team won with 13−5 against United States and Johnson won maximum points in her four games.

== Professional career ==
Johnson turned professional in March 1987. She won three tournaments in her first year as a professional and was Rookie of Year on the Ladies European Tour in 1987. She won four tournaments in 1990 and won the 1990 Order of Merit. Overall, she has won 19 tournaments on the Ladies European Tour and has finished in the top ten of the Order of Merit on thirteen occasions, including second places in 2000 and 2004.

Her latest regular victory came at the age of 48 years, 7 months, and 15 days at the 2014 Aberdeen Asset Management Ladies Scottish Open, making her the oldest ever winner on the Ladies European Tour and tied third on the all-time-list of most wins on the tour.

Johnson won the 1987 LPGA Tour Qualifying School to earn playing rights for the 1988 season. She has three wins on the US-based LPGA Tour. She won the 1993 Las Vegas LPGA tournament and the following week's LPGA Atlanta Women's Championship. Her last LPGA victory was the 1996 Fieldcrest Cannon Classic.

She was a member of the European Solheim Cup team in 1990, 1992, 1994, 1996, 1998, 2000, 2005, and 2007 and teamed with Laura Davies to represent England at the 2007 Women's World Cup of Golf.

== Senior career ==
After turning 50, Johnson has won six tournaments on the Legends Tour, where most tournaments had an age limit of 45, including three senior women's major golf championships. She won the inaugural Senior LPGA Championship in 2017 and repeated that victory in 2021.

At the 2023 U.S. Senior Women's Open at Waverley Country Club in Portland, Oregon, which had an age limit of 50, Johnson, at 57 years of age, was tied at fourth, five strokes from leader Catriona Matthew after two rounds. She advanced to the lead after a third round 5-under-par 67 and finished winner, one stroke ahead of Leta Lindley after the final round. Johnson received a winner's check of $180,000, twice as much as the highest prize on any regular win in her career.

Johnson became the player with most victories in senior women's majors championships and one of three players who, during their careers, have won both of the two senior majors. The other two players are Laura Davies and Helen Alfredsson.

== Awards, honors ==
In 2010, Johnson earned Life Time Membership of the Ladies European Tour, reaching the criteria for the honor after the tour decided to retrospectively award points for her 2008 win of the European Nations Cup.

In September 2024, the England Golf Federation announced that Johnson was selected to be inducted in to the England Golf Hall of Fame.

In June 2025 Johnson was in the King's Birthday honors list becoming an MBE .

== Amateur wins ==
- 1984 England Under-21 Championship, England Under-23 Championship
- 1985 English Women's Amateur Championship, English Women's Open Amateur Stroke Play Championship, England Under-23 Championship, French International Lady Juniors Amateur Championship

== Professional wins (29) ==
=== LPGA Tour wins (3) ===
No.	Date	Tournament	Winning score	Margin of victory	Runner-up
1	4 Apr 1993	Las Vegas LPGA	−7 (71-71-67=209)	4 strokes	(United States) Missie McGeorge
2	18 Apr 1993	Atlanta Women's Championship	−6 (72-72-68-70=282)	2 strokes	(United States) Sherri Steinhauer
3	29 Sep 1996	Fieldcrest Cannon Classic	−18 (67-71-68-64=270)	3 strokes	(United States) Kim Saiki

=== Ladies European Tour wins (19) ===
No.	Date	Tournament	Winning score	Margin of victory	Runner(s)-up
1	6 Jun 1987	McEwan's Wirral Classic	−4 (72-70-73-77=292)	Playoff	(Australia) Karen Lunn
2	25 Jul 1987	Bloor Homes Eastleigh Classic	−22 (64-60-60-58=242)	11 strokes	(Australia) Corinne Dibnah
3	25 Oct 1987	Woolmark Ladies' Matchplay	4 and 3		(France) Marie-Laure de Lorenzi
4	13 May 1990	Hennessy Ladies' Cup	−3 (72-68-71-74=285)	3 strokes	(France) Marie-Laure de Lorenzi, (United States) Tammie Green
5	15 Jul 1990	Bloor Homes Eastleigh Classic	−11 (61-66-58-64=249)	5 strokes	(Australia) Corinne Dibnah
6	16 Sep 1990	Ladies European Open	−12 (71-67-69-69=276)	2 strokes	(United States) Michelle Estill, (United States) Pearl Sinn
7	11 Nov 1990	Longines Classic	+2 (72-71-75-68=286)	6 strokes	(Scotland) Gillian Stewart
8	31 May 1992	Skol La Manga Club Classic	−10 (73-66-67-68=274)	1 stroke	(Belgium) Florence Descampe, (Sweden) Catrin Nilsmark
9	8 Sep 1996	Marks & Spencer European Open	−14 (74-66-64-70=274)	5 strokes	(Sweden) Pernilla Sterner, (Australia) Anne-Marie Knight
10	13 Oct 1996	Open de France Dames	−19 (62-68-70=200)	10 strokes	(Spain) Raquel Carriedo-Tomás
11	11 Jul 1999	Open de France Dames (2)	−6 (70-70-75-67=282)	1 stroke	(England) Alison Nicholas
12	24 Oct 1999	Marrakech Palmeraie Open	−12 (70-67-67=204)	5 strokes	(Belgium) Valérie Van Ryckeghem
13	6 Aug 2000	The Daily Telegraph Ladies British Masters	−9 (68-71-68=207)	2 strokes	(Norway) Vibeke Stensrud
14	15 Aug 2004	Wales "Golf as it should be" Ladies Open	−15 (73-70-69-65=277)	3 strokes	(Denmark) Iben Tinning, (England) Laura Davies
15	26 May 2007	BMW Ladies Italian Open	−15 (68-70-69-66=273)	1 stroke	(Germany) Bettina Hauert
16	6 Apr 2008	VCI European Ladies Golf Cup^ (with (England) Rebecca Hudson)	−21 (267)	5 strokes	(Germany) Martina Eberl / Anja Monke (Belgium) Ellen Smets / Lara Tadiotto
17	4 Jul 2010	Tenerife Ladies Open	−14 (67-71-66-70=274)	1 stroke	(France) Virginie Lagoutte
18	12 Sep 2010	Open de France Feminin (3)	−14 (70-67-63-74=274)	Playoff	(Italy) Diana Luna
19	29 Aug 2014	Aberdeen Asset Management Ladies Scottish Open	−7 (66-70-73=209)	2 strokes	(France) Gwladys Nocera

^ Nation team event, with two rounds of better-ball and two rounds of a greensome variation, sanctioned by the Ladies European Tour, counted as a tour win but with unofficial prize money and not counted in the Order of Merit.

Ladies European Tour playoff record (2–4)

No.	Year	Tournament	Opponent(s)	Result
1	1987	British Olivetti Tournament	(Scotland) Jane Connachan	Lost. Connachan won with par on first extra hole.
2	1987	McEwan's Wirral Classic	(Australia) Karen Lunn	Won on second extra hole.
3	1996	Hennessy Cup	(Sweden) Helen Alfredsson (Sweden) Liselotte Neumann	Lost. Alfredsson won with birdie on second extra hole. Neumann eliminated on first hole.
4	1997	Deesse Ladies' Swiss Open	(France) Marie-Laure de Lorenzi	Lost.
5	1999	Laura Davies' Invitational	(Sweden) Sofia Grönberg -Whitmore	Lost. Grönberg won win birdie on second extra hole.
6	2010	Open de France Feminin	(Italy) Diana Luna	Won with birdie on first extra hole.

=== Other wins (1) ===
No.	Date	Tournament	Winning score	Margin of victory	Runner(s)-up
1	18 Oct 1992	Sunrise Cup World Team Championship (individual)	+3 (71-72-76=219)	Shared with (Sweden) Liselotte Neumann	

=== Legends Tour wins (6) ===
Legend
Legends Tour major championships (3)
Other Legends Tour (3)

No.	Date	Tournament	Winning score	Margin of victory	Runner(s)-up
1	21 Aug 2016	The Legends Championship	−5 (68-71=139)	Playoff (Note: Johnson won with a par at the sixth playoff hole.)	(United States) Juli Inkster
2	12 Jul 2017	Senior LPGA Championship	−4 (67-72-73=212)	3 strokes	(United States) Michele Redman
3	10 Jun 2018	Suquamish Clearwater Legends Cup	−8 (66-70=136)	5 strokes	(United States) Lisa Grimes
4	7 Sep 2018	BJ's Charity Championship (with (England) Laura Davies)	−10 (61)	2 strokes	(United States) Patti Rizzo and (United States) Michele Redman, (United States) Donna Caponi and (United States) Laurie Rinker
5	29 Aug 2021	Senior LPGA Championship	−7 (67-73-69=209)	1 stroke	(Wales) Becky Morgan
6	27 Aug 2023	U.S. Senior Women's Open	−4 (73-72-67-72=284)	1 stroke	(United States) Leta Lindley

== Senior major championships ==
=== Wins (3) ===
Year	Tournament	Winning score	Margin of victory	Runner-up
2017	Senior LPGA Championship	−4 (67-72-73=212)	3 strokes	(United States) Michele Redman
2021	Senior LPGA Championship	−7 (67-73-69=209)	1 stroke	(Wales) Becky Morgan
2023	U.S. Senior Women's Open	−4 (73-72-67-72=284)	1 stroke	(United States) Leta Lindley

== Ladies European Tour career summary ==
Year	Earnings	Order of Merit rank	Scoring average
1987	£35,718	5	
1988	£2,110	90	
1989	£11,631	36	
1990	£83,043	1	
1991	£18,155	19	
1992	£51,805	4	
1993	£17,451	17	
1994	£31,309	15	
1995	£52,464	7	
1996	£80,333	3	
1997	£45,742	9	72.40
1998	£73,190	4	72.13
1999	£117,214	4	70.86
2000	€115,131	2	71.93
2001	€66,043	16	72.71
2002	€36,011	27	73.71
2003	€89,066	9	71.73
2004	€160,051	2	71.82
2005	€116,190	9	71.91
2006	€72,288	24	
2007	€202,468	4	72.35
2008	€67,782	34	73.12
2009	€46,567	40	72.30
2010	€139,925	9	72.11
2011	€30,839	71	73.27
2012	€124,438	10	71.90
2013	€50,055	44	72.63
2014	€92,607	17	72.38
2015	€27,434		75.00
2016	€32,093	52	73.61
2017	−	−	74.29

Yellow for top-10 finishes, green for first.

== Team appearances ==
Amateur

- European Lady Junior's Team Championship (representing England): 1984, 1986 (winners)
- Vagliano Trophy (representing Great Britain & Ireland): 1985 (winners)
- European Ladies' Team Championship (representing England): 1985
- Women's Home Internationals (representing England): 1985 (winners), 1986
- Curtis Cup (representing Great Britain & Ireland): 1986 (winners)
- Espirito Santo Trophy: (representing Great Britain & Ireland): 1986

Professional

- Solheim Cup (representing Europe): 1990, 1992 (winners), 1994, 1996, 1998, 2000 (winners), 2005, 2007
- World Cup (representing England): 2007, 2008
- VCI European Ladies Golf Cup (representing England): 2008 (winners)
- Handa Cup (representing World team): 2013 (winners), 2014, 2015
- The Queens (representing Europe): 2016

=== Solheim Cup record ===
Year	Total matches	Total W-L-H	Singles W-L-H	Foursomes W-L-H	Fourballs W-L-H	Points won	Points %
Career	25	5–13–7	1–7–0	2–4–2	2–2–5	8.5	34%
1990	3	0–3–0	0–1–0 lost to P. Bradley 8&7	0–1–0 lost w/M de Lorenzi 5&4	0–1–0 lost w/M de Lorenzi 2&1	0	0%
1992	3	1–1–1	1–0–0 def P. Sheehan 2&1	0–1–0 lost w/F.Descampe 1dn	0–0–1 halved w/F.Descampe	1.5	50%
1994	3	0–3–0	0–1–0 lost to B. Daniel 1dn	0–1–0 lost w/P. Wright 2dn	0–1–0 lost w/P. Wright 3&2	0	0%
1996	4	2–1–1	0–1–0 lost to D. Pepper 3&2	1–0–0 won w/L. Davies 4&3	1–0–1 won w/L. Davies 6&5, halved w/A. Sorenstam	2.5	62.5%
1998	2	0–2–0	0–1–0 lost to D. Pepper 3&2	0–1–0 lost w/L. Davies 3&1		0	0%
2000	4	2–1–1	0–1–0 lost to D. Pepper 2&1	1–0–1 won w/S. Gustafson 3&2, halved w/S. Gustafson	1–0–0 won w/S. Gustafson 3&2	2.5	62.5%
2005	3	0–1–2	0–1–0 lost to P.Hurst 2&1	0–0–1 halved w/S. Gustafson	0–0–1 halved w/I. Tinning	1	33.3%
2007	3	0–1–2	0–1–0 lost to A.Stanford 3&2		0–0–2 halved w/L. Davies, halved w/I. Tinning	1	33.3%

== See also ==
- List of golfers with most Ladies European Tour wins
