= Kay Cockerill =

American professional golfer (born 1964)

Personal information
- Nationality: United States
- Born: October 16, 1964 (age 62) San Jose, California, U.S.
- Height: 5 ft 8 in (1.73 m)
- Spouse: Danny Dann

Career
- Sport: Golf
- College: UCLA (graduated 1987)
- Turned professional: 1987
- Former tour: LPGA Tour (1988–97)
- Professional wins: 1

Number of wins by tour
- Epson Tour: 1

Best results in LPGA major championships
- Chevron Championship: CUT: 1987, 1992, 1993, 1994
- Women's PGA C'ship: CUT: 1989, 1991, 1992, 1993
- U.S. Women's Open: T16: 1988
- du Maurier Classic: T28: 1989

Kay Cockerill (born October 16, 1964) is an American professional golfer.

== Early life and amateur career ==
In 1964, Cockerill was in San Jose, California. She won the U.S. Women's Amateurs in 1986 and 1987.

As a non-scholarship player at UCLA, she had six individual wins from 1983 to 1986, was an All-American in 1985 and 1986, an Academic All-American in 1985/1986, placed fourth in the 1986 NCAA Championship, and was named to the NGCA Hall of Fame in 1986. She graduated from UCLA in 1987 with a degree in Economics.

== Professional golf career ==
She turned professional and joined the LPGA Tour in October 1987. She also played on the Futures Tour, winning once in 1988. She retired in 1997.

=== Broadcasting career ===
Since retiring from competition, Cockerill has worked as a reporter for Golf Channel covering the LPGA and Nationwide Tours.

== Personal life ==
Cockerill lives in San Francisco and is married to Danny Dann, a vice president of special events with the San Francisco Giants.

== Awards and honors ==
In 1999, Cockerill was inducted into the UCLA Athletics Hall of Fame.

== Professional wins (1) ==
=== Futures Tour wins (1) ===
| No. | Date | Tournament | Winning score | Margin of victory | Runner-up |
|---|---|---|---|---|---|
| 1 | Feb 9, 1988 | Marsh Landing Classic | Even (144) | Playoff | (United States) Meg Mallon |

== U.S. national team appearances ==
Amateur

- Espirito Santo Trophy: 1986
