= Missie McGeorge =

American professional golfer (born 1959)

Personal information
- Nationality: United States
- Born: August 20, 1959 (age 67) Pueblo, Colorado, U.S.
- Height: 5 ft 7 in (1.70 m)

Career
- Sport: Golf
- College: Southern Methodist University
- Status: Professional
- Former tour: LPGA Tour (1983–2000)
- Professional wins: 1

Number of wins by tour
- LPGA Tour: 1

Best results in LPGA major championships
- Chevron Championship: T15: 1989, 1996
- Women's PGA C'ship: T12: 1989
- U.S. Women's Open: T16: 1990
- du Maurier Classic: T14: 1987

Missie McGeorge (born August 20, 1959) is an American professional golfer who played on the LPGA Tour.

McGeorge won once on the LPGA Tour in 1994.

== Professional wins ==
=== LPGA Tour wins (1) ===
No.	Date	Tournament	Winning score	Margin of victory	Runner-up
1	Jun 27, 1994	Ping-Cellular One LPGA Golf Championship	−9 (72-69-66=207)	3 strokes	(United States) Betsy King
