= Jean Ashley Crawford =

American amateur golfer (born 1939)

Jean Ashley Crawford (born January 10, 1939) is an American former amateur golfer from the mid-1950s to the late 1960s.

In 1955, at age 16, she won the Broadmoor Invitational. She also won the 1961 Kansas Women's Amateur. She came to national prominence in 1960 when she competed for the first time in the U.S. Women's Amateur. In making it to the finals of that championship, she defeated Barbara McIntire, the defending champion and Ann Casey Johnstone, a member that year's Curtis Cup team. She eventually lost in the finals to JoAnne Gunderson.

She won the U.S. Women's Amateur title in 1965, defeating Anne Quast Welts in the final, who had previously won the title three times. In 1967, she again reached the final round of the U.S. Women's Amateur, losing to Mary Lou Dill. At that time, Ashley was a school teacher in Kansas. She represented the United States on three Curtis Cup teams (1962, 1966, and 1968). She served as the non-playing captain of the Curtis Cup team in 1972. Seven times in her career she finished in the top 4 in Kansas Women's Golf Championship. After her playing career ended, she served for several years as a member of the USGA Women's Committee. In 1992, she was elected to the Kansas Golf Hall of Fame.
