= Helen Alfredsson =

Swedish professional golfer (born 1965)

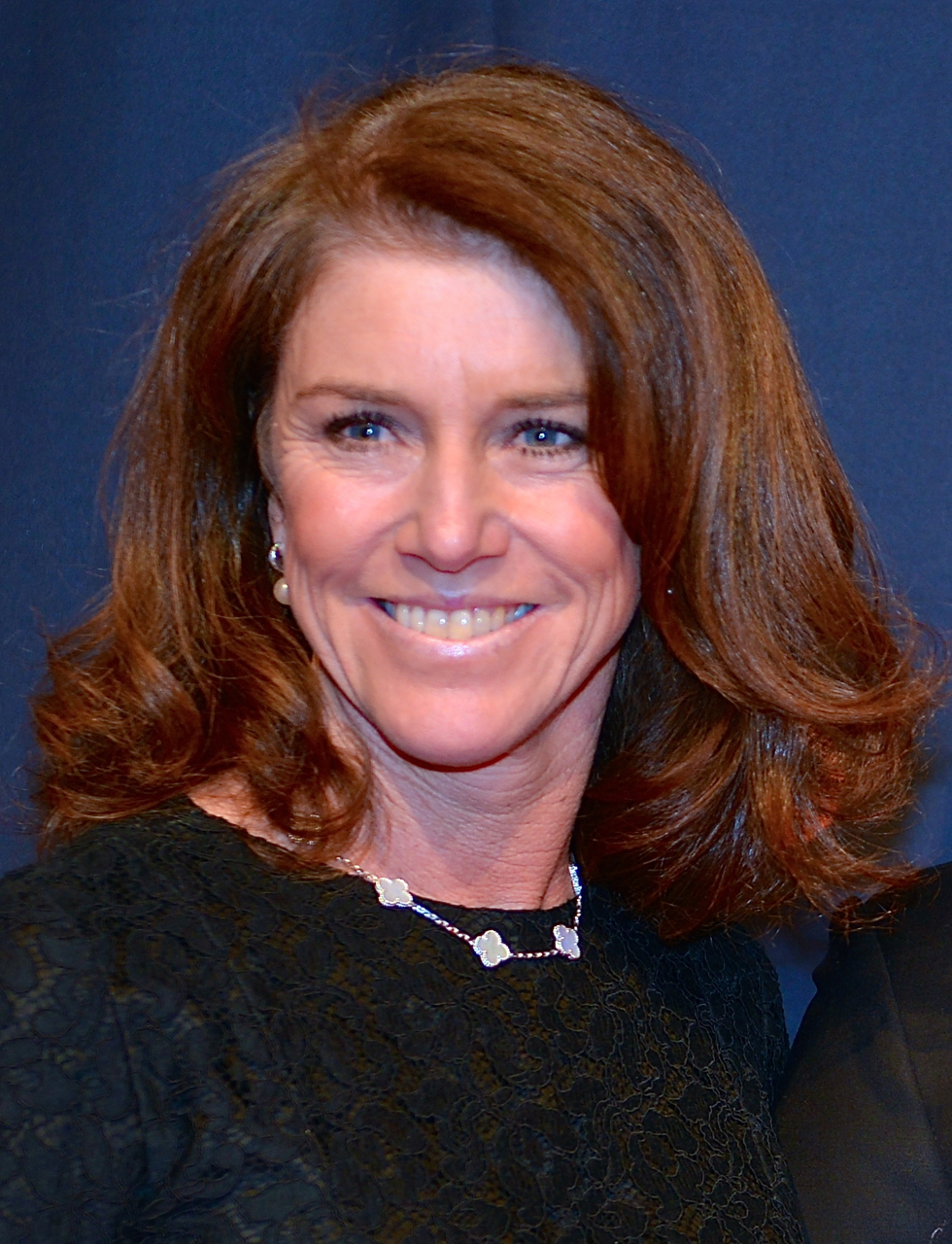
- Alfredsson in 2014

Personal information
- Full name: Helen Christine Alfredsson
- Nickname: Alfie
- Nationality: Sweden
- Born: 9 April 1965 (age 61) Gothenburg, Sweden
- Height: 5 ft 10 in (1.78 m)
- Spouse: Kent Nilsson (2005–2016)
- Life partner: Kent Nilsson

Career
- Sport: Golf
- College: U.S. International University (graduated 1988)
- Turned professional: 1989
- Current tour: Legends Tour (2012–present)
- Former tours: Ladies European Tour (1989–2013); LPGA Tour (1992–2013)
- Professional wins: 29

Number of wins by tour
- LPGA Tour: 7
- Ladies European Tour: 11
- LPGA of Japan Tour: 3
- WPGA Tour of Australasia: 1
- Other: 6 (regular); 2 (senior)

Best results in LPGA major championships (wins: 1)
- Chevron Championship: Won: 1993
- Women's PGA C'ship: T5: 1992
- U.S. Women's Open: 2nd/T2: 1993, 2008
- du Maurier Classic: T8: 1993
- Women's British Open: T40: 2002
- Evian Championship: CUT: 2013

Achievements and awards
- Ladies European Tour Rookie of the Year: 1989
- LPGA Tour Rookie of the Year: 1992
- Ladies European Tour Order of Merit: 1998
- Swedish Golfer of the Year: 1990

Helen Christine Alfredsson (born 9 April 1965) is a Swedish professional golfer who played primarily on the U.S.-based LPGA Tour and is also a life member of the Ladies European Tour. She won the LPGA major Nabisco Dinah Shore and twice finished second in the U.S. Women's Open. She also won the Women's British Open once and the Evian Masters three times before those events were designated as majors in women's golf by the LPGA Tour. In 2019, she won a "senior slam" by winning both of the senior women's major championships.

== Early life ==
In 1965, Alfredsson was born in Gothenburg, Sweden. At the age of 11, she began playing golf at Gullbringa Golf & Country Club north of Gothenburg. At young ages, she represented Sweden on both junior level and in the national amateur team.

At young age she practiced ice skating and team handball. Her father Björn was a six-time Swedish handball champion and a keen golfer himself. The father and daughter won the 1999 Swedish Two Generations Mixed Championship, played as 36-hole foursome.

== Amateur career ==
Alfredsson attended United States International University, San Diego, California, playing in their golf team led by coach Gordon Severson and graduated in 1988. During summertime she played in Sweden and won the Swedish Match-play Championship three years in a row 1986 through 1988, as an amateur while the championship since 1986 had become open for professionals and part of the Swedish Golf Tour for women.

In 1987, she was a member of the winning Swedish team at the European Ladies' Team Championship at Turnberry, Scotland. She was also a member of the Swedish team in the Espirito Santo Trophy 1986 and 1988. At home soil in Stockholm in 1988, Sweden finished second after the United States, which was at the time, the best Swedish finish ever. The same year Alfredsson finished individual bronze-medallist at the European Ladies Amateur Championship at Pedrena Golf Club, Spain.

After graduating in 1988 with a degree in International Business and Marketing, she tried a career in Paris, France as a model and stayed for six months.

== Professional career ==
In January 1989, Alfredsson turned professional. She began her professional career on the Ladies European Tour where she was awarded 1989 Rookie of the Year. The next year, in 1990, she claimed her maiden professional win at the Women's British Open. She won twice on the LET in 1991 and won once each on the Australian and Japan tours. She earned exempt status for the 1992 LPGA Tour season by tying for 17th at the LPGA Final Qualifying Tournament.

She earned Rookie of the Year honors on the LPGA Tour in 1992 and has won seven LPGA Tour events, including one LPGA major: the 1993 Nabisco Dinah Shore. A little over three months after her Dinah Shore victory, Alfredsson nearly won the U.S. Women's Open at Crooked Stick Golf Club. Alfredsson entered the final round with a two-stroke advantage, but finished tied for 2nd, one shot behind winner Lauri Merten.

At the 1994 U.S. Women's Open at Indianwood Golf & Country Club, Michigan, Alfredsson shot an 8 under first round 63, a new tournament single round record. Her 36-hole total 132 also broke the tournament record. When she reached 13 under during the third round, it was at the time the lowest score to par ever reached in a U.S. Open, by men or women. After playing her last 29 holes in 14 over par, she fell to tied 9th, eight shots behind winner Patty Sheehan.

During her career on the LPGA Tour, Alfredsson continued to play a limited number of events in Europe, where she won eleven times. She finished on top of the Ladies European Tour money list in 1998.

In 2008, Alfredsson came back, after recovering from injuries in her leg, back and shoulder, and won her third Evian Masters title, her first LPGA Tour win in five years.

She was member of the European Solheim Cup team as a player eight times: 1990, 1992, 1994, 1996, 1998, 2000, 2002 and 2009. She was appointed captain of the 2007 European Solheim Cup team, losing to the United States team 12–16. When she qualified for the European Team at the 2009 Solheim Cup, she became the first, and still the only, player on both teams, to qualify as a player after she has been the team captain a previous year.

While playing golf, Alfredsson has been known to curse long and loud in Swedish. The Financial Times of London once editorialized "They can be louder and more richly worded than many of Lenny Bruce's best performances". Alfredsson said about cursing "You have to stay so focused on the tour, you work so hard, you don't want anything to interfere. But then all of a sudden this little devil comes crawling out, saying, 'It's time to do something. You've been good too long." "

In September 2013, Alfredsson officially announced her retirement from the LPGA Tour.

After her retirement from competitive golf on the regular tour, she came back, playing on the women's senior tour, the Legends Tour, primarily in the senior majors, with great success. She tied for third in the inaugural Senior LPGA Championship in 2017 and improved that by finishing tied second at the 2018 Senior LPGA Championship. She won both of the two senior ladies major championships in 2019, the U.S. Senior Women's Open and the Senior LPGA Championship, completing the same "senior slam" as Laura Davies achieved in 2018.

== Personal life ==
During her college years in San Diego, California, she met Leonardo Cuéllar, the school's soccer coach and a former World Cup and Olympic soccer player for Mexico. The couple later got engaged.

In 2005, Alfredsson married former National Hockey League player Kent Nilsson and became stepmother of his son, hockey player Robert Nilsson. Kent Nilsson was en elite amateur golfer himself, with a handicap below scratch. They divorced in 2016, but came back to live together.

She has contributed to the foundation of a charity golf tournament supporting research on Alzheimer's disease, which affected her mother, who died in 2010.

== Awards and honors ==
- In 1986, Alfredsson earned Elite Sign No. 81 by the Swedish Golf Federation, on the basis of national team appearances and national championship performances.
- In 1989, Ladies European Tour awarded her their Rookie of the Year honors.
- In 1990, she was awarded the Swedish Golfer of the Year.
- In 1992, she was bestowed by the Swedish Golf Federation the Golden Club, the highest award for contributions to Swedish golf.
- In 1992, the LPGA Tour honored her with Rookie of the Year honors.
- In 1998, Alfredsson was awarded honorary member of the PGA of Sweden.
- In 2024, she was inducted into the Swedish Golf Hall of Fame.

== Amateur wins ==
- 1981 Swedish Junior Match-play Championship
- 1982 Belgian Open Junior Championship
- 1983 Swedish Junior Match-play Championship
- 1985 Swedish Junior Match-play Championship

== Professional wins (29) ==
=== LPGA Tour wins (7) ===
Legend
LPGA Tour major championships (1)
Other LPGA Tour (6)

No.	Date	Tournament	Winning score	Margin of victory	Runner(s)-up
1	28 Mar 1993	Nabisco Dinah Shore	−4 (69-71-72-72=284)	2 strokes	(United States) Tina Barrett (United States) Amy Benz (United States) Betsy King
2	31 Jul 1994	PING/Welch's Championship	−14 (70-68-70-66=274)	4 strokes	(United States) Pat Bradley (United States) Juli Inkster
3	25 Jan 1998	The Office Depot	−11 (68-71-67-71=277)	2 strokes	(Sweden) Liselotte Neumann
4	15 Mar 1998	Welch's/Circle K Championship	−14 (68-64-70-72=274)	1 stroke	(United States) Dana Dormann (Sweden) Liselotte Neumann
5	5 Oct 2003	Longs Drugs Challenge	−13 (72-69-64-70=275)	1 stroke	(United States) Pat Hurst (South Korea) Jung Yeon Lee (South Korea) Se Ri Pak (South Korea) Grace Park (Australia) Rachel Teske
6	27 Jul 2008	Evian Masters^{1}	−15 (71-63-71-67=273)	Playoff	(South Korea) Na Yeon Choi (Brazil) Angela Park
7	26 Oct 2008	Grand China Air LPGA	−12 (70-69-65=204)	3 strokes	(Taiwan) Yani Tseng

LPGA Tour playoff record (1–3)

No.	Year	Tournament	Opponent(s)	Result
1	1992	Mazda Japan Classic	(United States) Betsy King	Lost to birdie on fourth extra hole
2	1997	Samsung World Championship of Women's Golf	(United States) Juli Inkster (United States) Kelly Robbins	Inkster won with birdie on first extra hole
3	2008	Evian Masters^{1}	(South Korea) Na Yeon Choi (Brazil) Angela Park	Won with birdie on third extra hole Park eliminated by birdie on first hole
4	2008	Safeway Classic	(Sweden) Sophie Gustafson (United States) Cristie Kerr	Kerr won with birdie on first extra hole

=== Ladies European Tour wins (11) ===
No.	Date	Tournament	Winning score	Margin of victory	Runner(s)-up
1	5 Aug 1990	Weetabix Women's British Open	−4 (70-71-74-73=288)	Playoff	(Zimbabwe) Jane Hill
2	16 Jun 1991	Hennessy Ladies Cup	−8 (70-71-71-68=280)	Playoff	(France) Marie-Laure de Lorenzi, (Australia) Corinne Dibnah
3	23 Jun 1991	Trophée Coconut Skol	−12 (73-68-73-75=276)	3 strokes	(Scotland) Dale Reid
4	12 Jul 1992	Hennessy Ladies Cup (2)	−17 (68-70-67-66=271)	1 stroke	(England) Trish Johnson
5	30 Aug 1992	IBM Ladies' Open	−14 (68-70-71-69=278)	2 strokes	(Sweden) Liselotte Neumann
6	12 Jun 1994	Evian Masters	−1 (71 73 73 70=287)	3 strokes	(Australia) Sarah Gautrey, (England) Laura Fairclaugh
7	7 Jul 1996	Hennessy Cup (3)	−8 (68-70-71-71=280)	Playoff	(England) Trish Johnson, (Sweden) Liselotte Neumann
8	10 Aug 1997	McDonald's WPGA Championship of Europe	−12 (74-65-67-70=276)	4 strokes	(Scotland) Kathryn Marshall, (Sweden) Charlotta Sörenstam
9	6 Jun 1998	Evian Masters (2)	−11 (70-69-73- 65=277)	4 strokes	(Sweden) Maria Hjorth
10	29 Jul 2001	WPGA Championship of Europe (2)	−16 (67-70-68-71=276)	4 strokes	(Norway) Suzann Pettersen
11	27 Jul 2008	Evian Masters^{1}	−15 (72-63-71-67=273)	Playoff	(South Korea) Na Yeon Choi, (Brazil) Angela Park

Ladies European Tour playoff record (4–1)

No.	Year	Tournament	Opponent(s)	Result
1	1990	Women's British Open	(Zimbabwe) Jane Hill	Won with par on fourth extra hole
2	1991	Hennessy Ladies Cup	(France) Marie-Laure de Lorenzi (Australia) Corinne Dibnah	Won with birdie on third extra hole de Lorenzi eliminated by par on first hole
3	1996	Hennessy Cup	(England) Trish Johnson (Sweden) Liselotte Neumann	Won with birdie on second extra hole Neumann eliminated on first hole
4	1996	Compaq Swedish Open	(Italy) Federica Dassu (Scotland) Kathryn Marshall	Dassu won with par on fourth extra hole Alfredsson eliminated by par on third hole
5	2008	Evian Masters^{1}	(South Korea) Na Yeon Choi (Brazil) Angela Park	Won with birdie on third extra hole Park eliminated by birdie on first hole

Note: Alfredsson won The Evian Championship (formerly named the Evian Masters) three times before it was recognized as a major championship on the LPGA Tour in 2013. One of those wins was after the Evian Masters was co-sanctioned with the LPGA Tour in 2000. Alfredsson won the Women's British Open once before it was co-sanctioned by the LPGA Tour in 1994 and recognized as a major championship on the LPGA Tour in 2001.

Note:

- ^{1} Co-sanctioned by LPGA Tour and Ladies European Tour

=== LPGA of Japan Tour wins (3) ===
No.	Date	Tournament	Winning score	Margin of victory	Runner-up
1	24 Nov 1991	Daio Paper Elleair Ladies Open	−12 (70-67-67=204)	5 strokes	(Taiwan) Wu Ming-yeh
2	15 Nov 1992	Itoki Classic	−16 (64-68-68=200)	5 strokes	(Japan) Ayako Okamoto
3	16 Nov 1997	Itoen Ladies	−8 (68-71-69=208)	Playoff	(Japan) Akemi Yamaoka

=== ALPG Tour wins (1) ===
No.	Date	Tournament	Winning score	Margin of victory	Runner-up
1	3 Feb 1991	Queensland Open	+3 (71-75-73=219)	1 stroke	(Australia) Sherrin Smyers

=== Swedish Golf Tour wins (4) ===
No.	Date	Tournament	Winning score	Margin of victory	Runner-up
1	27 Jul 1986	SM Trygg-Hansa Cup (as an amateur)	4 & 3		(Sweden) Sofia Grönberg-Whitmore
2	26 Jul 1987	SM Trygg-Hansa Cup (2) (as an amateur)	6 & 4		(Sweden) Cecilia Lundin
3	2 Jul 1988	Swedish Matchplay Championship (as an amateur)	3 & 2		(Sweden) Carin Koch
4	24 Jul 1988	Swedish International Trygg-Hansa Open (as an amateur)	+2 (69-74-70-77=290)	8 strokes	(Sweden) Sofia Grönberg Whitmore

=== Other wins (2) ===
No.	Date	Tournament	Winning score	Margin of victory	Runner(s)-up
1	10 Nov 1991	Benson & Hedges Trophy (team with (Sweden) Anders Forsbrand)	−13 (73-66-68-68=275)	2 strokes	(England) Penny Grice-Whittaker and (England) Malcolm MacKenzie, (United States) Pearl Sinn and (United States) Bryan Norton
2	18 Oct 1992	Sunrise Cup World Team Championship (team with (Sweden) Liselotte Neumann)	+13 (146-146-153=445)	2 strokes	England − Laura Davies / Trish Johnson

=== Legends Tour wins (2) ===
Legend
Legends Tour major championships (2)
Other Legends Tour (0)

No.	Date	Tournament	Winning score	Margin of victory	Runner(s)-up
1	19 May 2019	U.S. Senior Women's Open	+1 (75-69-69-72=285)	2 strokes	(United States) Juli Inkster (England) Trish Johnson
2	16 Oct 2019	Senior LPGA Championship	−2 (72-72-70=214)	3 strokes	(United States) Juli Inkster

== Major championships ==
=== Wins (1) ===
Year	Championship	Winning score	Margin	Runners-up
1993	Nabisco Dinah Shore	−4 (69-71-72-72=284)	2 strokes	(United States) Tina Barrett, (United States) Amy Benz, (United States) Betsy King

=== Results timeline ===
Tournament	1991	1992	1993	1994	1995	1996	1997	1998	1999	2000
Kraft Nabisco Championship	T49		1	T48	CUT	T48	T54	T3	T10	T57
LPGA Championship		T5	CUT	T35	T38	CUT	T67	T51	CUT	CUT
U.S. Women's Open	CUT	T13	T2	T9	T40	CUT	T48	T13	T12	CUT
du Maurier Classic		T28	T8	T31	T9	CUT	T14	T34	CUT	T40

Tournament	2001	2002	2003	2004	2005	2006	2007	2008	2009
Kraft Nabisco Championship	T46	T45	T64	T40	T35	T8	T37	T21	T12
LPGA Championship	9	CUT	CUT	T61	CUT	CUT		CUT	T57
U.S. Women's Open	T26		DQ	CUT	T23	CUT		2	WD
Women's British Open ^	T64	T40	T61	T60	T42	CUT	CUT	T56	CUT

Tournament	2010	2011	2012	2013
Kraft Nabisco Championship		CUT		CUT
LPGA Championship	T42			
U.S. Women's Open	CUT			
Women's British Open	CUT			CUT
The Evian Championship ^^				CUT

^ The Women's British Open replaced the du Maurier Classic as an LPGA major in 2001.
^^ The Evian Championship was added as a major in 2013.

Win
Top 10
Did not play

CUT = missed the half-way cut
DQ = disqualified
WD = withdrew
T = tied

=== Summary ===
Tournament	Wins	2nd	3rd	Top-5	Top-10	Top-25	Events	Cuts made
Kraft Nabisco Championship	1	0	1	2	4	6	20	17
LPGA Championship	0	0	0	1	2	2	18	9
U.S. Women's Open	0	2	0	2	3	7	19	10
du Maurier Classic	0	0	0	0	2	3	9	7
Women's British Open	0	0	0	0	0	0	11	6
The Evian Championship	0	0	0	0	0	0	1	0
Totals	1	2	1	5	11	18	78	49

- Most consecutive cuts made – 9 (1997 Kraft Nabisco Championship – 1999 Kraft Nabisco Championship)
- Longest streak of top-10s – 2 (1993 U.S. Open – 1993 du Maurier Classic)

== Senior major championships ==
=== Wins (2) ===
Year	Tournament	Winning score	Margin of victory	Runner(s)-up
2019	U.S. Senior Women's Open	+1 (75-69-69-72=285)	2 strokes	(United States) Juli Inkster (England) Trish Johnson
2019	Senior LPGA Championship	−2 (72-72-70=214)	3 strokes	(United States) Juli Inkster

== Team appearances ==
Amateur

- European Lady Junior's Team Championship (representing Sweden): 1980, 1981 (winners), 1982, 1983, 1984 (winners), 1986
- European Ladies' Team Championship (representing Sweden): 1983, 1985, 1987 (winners)
- Espirito Santo Trophy (representing Sweden): 1986, 1988

Professional

- Solheim Cup (representing Europe): 1990, 1992 (winners), 1994, 1996, 1998, 2000 (winners), 2002, 2007 (non-playing captain), 2009
- World Cup (representing Sweden): 2007
- Lexus Cup (representing International team): 2008 (winners)
- Handa Cup (representing World team): 2012 (tie), 2013 (winners), 2014, 2015

== See also ==
- List of golfers with most Ladies European Tour wins
