= U.S. Senior Women's Open =

American national golf championship

Tournament information
- Location: Ann Arbor, Michigan (2026)
- Established: 2018, 8 years ago
- Course: Barton Hills Country Club (2026)
- Par: 72 (2026)
- Length: 6,237 yards (5,703 m) (2026)
- Organized by: USGA
- Format: Stroke play
- Prize fund: $1.00 million
- Month played: August

Tournament record score
- Aggregate: 276 (England) Laura Davies (2018) (Sweden) Annika Sörenstam (2021)
- To par: −16 (England) Laura Davies (2018)

Current champion
- (Sweden) Maria McBride

Current tournament
- 2026 U.S. Senior Women's Open

The U.S. Senior Women's Open is one of fourteen U.S. national golf championships organized by the United States Golf Association. This USGA championship is open to women whose 50th birthday falls on or before the first day of competition and hold a handicap index not exceeding 7.4. It is part of the Legends of the LPGA Tour. The inaugural championship was held in 2018 at the Chicago Golf Club in Wheaton, Illinois.

The U.S. Senior Women's Open and the LPGA Legends Championship are considered to constitute the senior women's major golf championships. The eligibility for the Senior LPGA Championship and the Legends of the LPGA Tour are for female golfers age 45 and older, why not all Senior LPGA Championship players are eligible for the U.S. Senior Women's Open.

The field for the tournament is 120 players and is filled with professionals and amateurs with exemptions and sectional qualifying status. The tournament is 72 holes of stroke play, with the top 50 and ties making the 36-hole cut. Winners gain an exemption into the following year's U.S. Women's Open.

== Eligibility ==
The following players are exempt from qualifying for the U.S. Senior Women's Open, provided they are 50 years old. Senior amateur categories require players to still be amateurs. For the first three editions of the tournament, golfers eligible in categories with an upper age limit, were eligible regardless of that.

- Winners of the U.S. Senior Women's Open who have not yet reached their 66th (67th for 2018 and 2019) birthdays on or before the final day of the championship or winners in the past ten years (11 for 2018 and 2019), regardless of age.
  - The cancellation of the 2020 tournament allows the USGA to extend the invitation.
- The top 20 (and ties) from the previous year's U.S. Senior Women's Open
- The low amateur from the previous year's U.S. Senior Women's Open
- Winners of the U.S. Women's Open who are 50 but have not reached their 60th (61st for players born before July 9, 1970) birthday on or before the final day of the championship.
  - For players born between July 12, 1960 to July 9, 1970, because of the cancellation of the 2020 tournament, an extra year is given (the tournament was originally scheduled from July 9-12, 2020).
- From the two most recent U.S. Women's Open, any player returning a 72-hole score
- Finalist in the U.S. Women's Amateur the previous year
- Winners of the U.S. Women's Amateur (if turned professional a three-year exemption and if remained amateur a five-year exemption)
- Winners of the women's major professional golf championships who are 50 but have not reached their 60th (61st for players born before July 9, 1970) birthday on or before the final day of the tournament – Chevron Championship, KPMG Women's PGA Championship, editions of the Canadian Women's Open from 1979 to 2000, editions of The Women's Open Championship since 2001, and editions of the Evian Championship since 2013.
  - The USGA reserves the right to add an extra year for these players born between July 12, 1960 to July 9, 1970.
- Finalists of the previous U.S. Senior Women's Amateur
  - Winner receives a two year exemption, loser receives one year exemption.
- Winner of the past two U.S. Women's Mid-Amateur
- Members of either two of the two more recent Curtis Cup teams
- Members of the two most recent U.S. Espirito Santo Trophy teams
- Playing members of the five most recent Solheim Cup teams
- Top 30 players from the previous year's final Legends Tour money list
  - Players will not be moved up if one player is under 45.
- Top 10 money leaders of all-time Legends Tour earnings
- Top 15 money leaders on the current Legends Tour money list
- Winners of Legends Tour events, excluding team events, in the last two years and current year
- Top 75 LPGA Tour money leaders all-time
- Winners of The Women's Amateur Championship 50 to 52 years of age
- Winners of the LPGA Teaching and Club Professional Championship in the past five years and the second-place finisher in the most recent edition
- Winners of LPGA Tour events, in the current and last five years
- Top five money leaders from the previous year's final Ladies European Tour and LPGA of Japan Tour career money lists
- Winners of the most current Senior Ladies' British Open Amateur and Canadian Senior Women's Amateur championships
- Special exemptions

== Winners ==
Year	Champion	Score	To par	Margin of victory	Runner-up	Purse ($)	Winner's share ($)	Site
2026	(Sweden) Maria McBride	282	–6	2 strokes	(Sweden) Annika Sörenstam	1,000,000	200,000	Barton Hills Country Club
2025	(Wales) Becky Morgan	285	–7	6 strokes	(United States) Juli Inkster	1,000,000	200,000	San Diego Country Club
2024	(United States) Leta Lindley	275	−9	2 strokes	(Japan) Kaori Yamamoto	1,000,000	180,000	Fox Chapel Golf Club
2023	(England) Trish Johnson	284	−4	1 stroke	(United States) Leta Lindley	1,000,000	180,000	Waverley Country Club
2022	(United States) Jill McGill	289	−3	1 stroke	(United States) Leta Lindley	1,000,000	180,000	NCR Country Club (South)
2021	(Sweden) Annika Sörenstam	276	−12	8 strokes	(Sweden) Liselotte Neumann	1,000,000	180,000	Brooklawn Country Club
2020	Canceled due to the COVID-19 pandemic							Brooklawn Country Club
2019	(Sweden) Helen Alfredsson	285	+1	2 strokes	(United States) Juli Inkster (England) Trish Johnson	1,000,000	180,000	Pine Needles Lodge and Golf Club
2018	(England) Laura Davies	276	−16	10 strokes	(United States) Juli Inkster	1,000,000	180,000	Chicago Golf Club

== Future sites ==
Year	Host site	City	Dates
2027	Tacoma Country and Golf Club	Lakewood, Washington	August 19–22
2028	SentryWorld	Stevens Point, Wisconsin	TBD
2029	Champions Golf Club	Houston, Texas	TBD
2030	Spyglass Hill Golf Course	Pebble Beach, California	TBD
2031	Plainfield Country Club	Edison, New Jersey	TBD
2032	Prairie Dunes Country Club	Hutchinson, Kansas	TBD
2033	Lancaster Country Club	Lancaster, Pennsylvania	TBD
2036	Salem Country Club	Peabody, Massachusetts	TBD

== See also ==
- U.S. Senior Open
- Golf in the United States
