= LPGA Legends Championship =

Women's professional golf tournament

- Logo used for inaugural edition in 2017.

Tournament information
- Location: Columbus, Indiana, U.S. (2026)
- Established: 2017
- Course: Harrison Lakes Country Club (2026)
- Par: 71
- Length: 5,877 yards (5,374 m)
- Tour: Legends Tour
- Format: Stroke play – 54 holes
- Prize fund: $400,000

Tournament record score
- Aggregate: 202 (Australia) Karrie Webb (2022)
- To par: −14 as above

Current champion
- (Sweden) Maria McBride

Location in the United States

The LPGA Legends Championship, formerly known as the Senior LPGA Championship, is a women's professional golf tournament on the Legends of the LPGA Tour and one of two tournaments forming the senior women's major golf championships. It began in 2017 and the first event was played at The Pete Dye Course in French Lick, Indiana. The minimum age is 45.

Despite the 2015 announcement by the United States Golf Association that a U.S. Senior Women's Open would be added from 2018, for competitors aged 50 or over, the eligibility for the Senior LPGA Championship and the Legends Tour remained to be for female golfers age 45 and older, meaning not all Senior LPGA Championship players are eligible for the U.S. Senior Women's Open.

== Winners ==
Year	Date	Champion	Winning score	To par	Margin of victory	Runner(s)-up	Site	Ref.
2026	Aug 15	(Sweden) Maria McBride	68-70-68=206	–7	1 stroke	(United States) Angela Stanford	Harrison Lakes Country Club (IN)	
2025	May 24	(United States) Cristie Kerr	69-71-70=210	–6	2 strokes	(United States) Moira Dunn–Bohls	Copper Rock Country Club (UT)	
2024	May 25	(United States) Angela Stanford	70-67-69=206	−10	3 strokes	(United States) Cristie Kerr	Copper Rock Country Club (UT)	
2023	Jul 1	(United States) Angela Stanford	71-70-65=206	−10	1 stroke	(England) Trish Johnson	Sultan's Run Golf Club (IN)	
2022	Jul 24	(Australia) Karrie Webb	69-66-67=202	−14	4 strokes	(Sweden) Annika Sörenstam	Salina Country Club (KS)	
2021	Aug 29	(England) Trish Johnson	67-73-69=209	−7	1 stroke	(Wales) Becky Morgan	French Lick Resort (Pete Dye Course) (IN)	
2020	~~Aug 1~~	Cancelled due to the COVID-19 pandemic					French Lick Resort (Pete Dye Course) (IN)	
2019	Oct 16	(Sweden) Helen Alfredsson	72-72-70=214	−2	3 strokes	(United States) Juli Inkster	French Lick Resort (Pete Dye Course) (IN)	
2018	Oct 17	(England) Laura Davies	68-70-70=208	−8	4 strokes	(Sweden) Helen Alfredsson (Italy) Silvia Cavalleri	French Lick Resort (Pete Dye Course) (IN)	
2017	Jul 12	(England) Trish Johnson	67−72−73=212	−4	3 strokes	(United States) Michele Redman	French Lick Resort (Pete Dye Course) (IN)	

== Future sites ==
Year	Host site	City	Dates
2027	The Links at Gettysburg	Gettysburg, Pennsylvania	TBD
