= Legends Tour =

US-based golf tour for women 45 and older

The Legends of the LPGA, formerly known as the Women's Senior Golf Tour (2000–2005) and the Legends Tour (2006–2021), is a professional golf tour for women aged 45 and older. It is based in the United States and is the official senior tour of the LPGA Tour. The tour was founded in 2000, and is intended to allow women to prolong their competitive golf careers on the model of the PGA Tour Champions for men.

== History ==
=== Background ===
From 1996 to 2000, retired LPGA golfer Jane Blalock worked to organize a new senior golf tour for older and often retired LPGA golfers. After receiving support from 24 other founding members and a 3-year sponsorship program from the Green Bay Chamber of Commerce, The Women's Senior Golf Tour debuted in August 2000 in Green Bay, Wisconsin with a minimum age of 43 and a $500,000 purse, with $75,000 going to the winner. Around 30,000 people attended over three days. The senior tour paid a fee to the LPGA for permission to involve active LPGA players, but otherwise remained independent.

=== Founding ===
The Women's Senior Golf Tour was the official senior tour of the LPGA in 2001 and was later called the Legends Tour. Initially it grew from two annual events to 11 events by 2013.

Sixteen events were held in the first six years of operation between 2001 and 2006. In addition a team event, the annual Handa Cup pitting LPGA Legends players from the United States against LPGA Legends players from the rest of the world, was introduced in 2006. It is The Legends Tour's version of the Solheim Cup. From 2007 to 2013, 45 tournaments were held.

=== Recent years ===
In 2017, the Senior LPGA Championship was inaugurated, intended to take place every year.

Despite the 2015 announcement by the United States Golf Association that a U.S. Senior Women's Open would be added from 2018, for competitors aged 50 or over, the eligibility for the tour remained to be for female golfers age 45 and older.

The Senior LPGA Championship and the U.S. Senior Women's Open are considered to constitute the senior women's major golf championships.

On August 5, 2021, the Legends Tour announced its new name, The Legends of the LPGA.

== See also ==
- Professional golf tours
