= 1991 LPGA Tour =

Golf tour season

1991 LPGA Tour season
- Duration: January 18, 1991 – November 10, 1991
- Number of official events: 34
- Most wins: 4 (United States) Pat Bradley, (United States) Meg Mallon
- Money leader: (United States) Pat Bradley
- Player of the Year: (United States) Pat Bradley
- Vare Trophy: (United States) Pat Bradley
- Rookie of the Year: (United States) Brandie Burton

The 1991 LPGA Tour was the 42nd season since the LPGA Tour officially began in 1950. The season ran from January 18 to November 10. The season consisted of 34 official money events. Pat Bradley and Meg Mallon won the most tournaments, four each. Bradley led the money list with earnings of $763,118.

The season saw the first tournament in Australia, the Daikyo World Championship. There were five first-time winners in 1991: Danielle Ammaccapane, Michelle Estill, Meg Mallon, Melissa McNamara, and Nancy Scranton.

The tournament results and award winners are listed below.

== Tournament results ==
The following table shows all the official money events for the 1991 season. "Date" is the ending date of the tournament. The numbers in parentheses after the winners' names are the number of wins they had on the tour up to and including that event. Majors are shown in bold.

Date	Tournament	Location	Winner	Score	Purse ($)	1st prize ($)
Jan 20	The Jamaica Classic	Jamaica	(United States) Jane Geddes (8)	207 (−6)	500,000	75,000
Feb 3	Oldsmobile LPGA Classic	Florida	(United States) Meg Mallon (1)	276 (−12)	400,000	60,000
Feb 10	The Phar-Mor at Inverrary	Florida	(United States) Beth Daniel (26)	209 (−7)	500,000	75,000
Feb 23	Orix Hawaiian Ladies Open	Hawaii	(United States) Patty Sheehan (26)	207 (−9)	350,000	52,500
Mar 2	Women's Kemper Open	Hawaii	(United States) Deb Richard (2)	275 (−9)	500,000	75,000
Mar 10	Inamori Classic	California	(England) Laura Davies (5)	277 (−11)	400,000	60,000
Mar 17	Desert Inn LPGA International	Nevada	(United States) Penny Hammel (3)	211 (−5)	400,000	60,000
Mar 24	Standard Register PING	Arizona	(United States) Danielle Ammaccapane (1)	283 (−9)	500,000	82,500
Mar 31	**Nabisco Dinah Shore**	California	(United States) **Amy Alcott (29)**	273 (−15)	600,000	90,000
Apr 7	Ping/Welch's Championship	Arizona	(United States) Christa Johnson (6)	273 (−15)	350,000	52,500
May 5	Sara Lee Classic	Tennessee	(United States) Nancy Lopez (44)	206 (−10)	425,000	63,750
May 12	Crestar-Farm Fresh Classic	Virginia	(United States) Hollis Stacy (18)	282 (−6)	400,000	60,000
May 19	Centel Classic	Florida	(United States) Pat Bradley (27)	278 (−10)	1,100,000	165,000
May 26	LPGA Corning Classic	New York	(United States) Betsy King (24)	273 (−15)	400,000	60,000
Jun 2	Rochester International	New York	(United States) Rosie Jones (5)	276 (−12)	400,000	60,000
Jun 9	Atlantic City Classic	New Jersey	(United States) Jane Geddes (9)	208 (−8)	300,000	45,000
Jun 16	Lady Keystone Open	Pennsylvania	(United States) Colleen Walker (4)	207 (−9)	400,000	60,000
Jun 23	McDonald's Championship	Delaware	(United States) Beth Daniel (27)	273 (−11)	750,000	112,500
Jun 30	**Mazda LPGA Championship**	Maryland	(United States) **Meg Mallon (2)**	274 (−10)	1,000,000	150,000
Jul 7	Jamie Farr Toledo Classic	Ohio	(United States) Alice Miller (8)	205 (−8)	350,000	75,000
Jul 14	**U.S. Women's Open**	Texas	(United States) **Meg Mallon (3)**	283 (−1)	600,000	110,000
Jul 21	JAL Big Apple Classic	New York	(United States) Betsy King (25)	279 (−5)	500,000	75,000
Jul 28	LPGA Bay State Classic	Massachusetts	(United States) Juli Inkster (14)	275 (−13)	400,000	60,000
Aug 4	The Phar-Mor in Youngstown	Ohio	(United States) Deb Richard (3)	207 (−9)	500,000	75,000
Aug 11	Stratton Mountain LPGA Classic	Vermont	(United States) Melissa McNamara (1)	278 (−10)	450,000	67,500
Aug 18	Northgate Computer Classic	Minnesota	(United States) Cindy Rarick (5)	211 (−5)	400,000	60,000
Aug 25	LPGA Chicago Sun-Times Shoot-Out	Illinois	(United States) Martha Nause (2)	275 (−13)	425,000	63,500
Sep 2	Rail Charity Golf Classic	Illinois	(United States) Pat Bradley (28)	197 (−19)	400,000	60,000
Sep 8	Ping-Cellular One LPGA Golf Championship	Oregon	(United States) Michelle Estill (1)	208 (−8)	400,000	60,000
Sep 15	**du Maurier Ltd. Classic**	Canada	(United States) **Nancy Scranton (1)**	279 (−9)	700,000	105,000
Sep 22	Safeco Classic	Washington	(United States) Pat Bradley (29)	280 (−8)	400,000	60,000
Sep 29	MBS LPGA Classic	California	(United States) Pat Bradley (30)	277 (−11)	350,000	52,500
Oct 6	Daikyo World Championship	Australia	(United States) Meg Mallon (4)	216 (−3)	325,000	100,000
Nov 10	Mazda Japan Classic	Japan	(Sweden) Liselotte Neumann (2)	211 (−5)	550,000	82,500

== Awards ==
Award	Winner	Country
Money winner	Pat Bradley (2)	United States
Scoring leader (Vare Trophy)	Pat Bradley (2)	United States
Player of the Year	Pat Bradley (2)	United States
Rookie of the Year	Brandie Burton	United States
