= 1993 LPGA Tour =

Golf tour season

1993 LPGA Tour season
- Duration: February 5, 1993 – November 7, 1993
- Number of official events: 31
- Most wins: 3 (United States) Brandie Burton
- Money leader: (United States) Betsy King
- Player of the Year: (United States) Betsy King
- Vare Trophy: (United States) Betsy King
- Rookie of the Year: (England) Suzanne Strudwick

The 1993 LPGA Tour was the 44th season since the LPGA Tour officially began in 1950. The season ran from February 5 to November 7. The season consisted of 31 official money events. Brandie Burton won the most tournaments, three. Betsy King led the money list with earnings of $595,992.

There were nine first-time winners in 1993: Kristi Albers, Helen Alfredsson, Donna Andrews, Missie Berteotti, Helen Dobson, Trish Johnson, Hiromi Kobayashi, Kelly Robbins, and Cindy Schreyer.

The tournament results and award winners are listed below.

== Tournament results ==
The following table shows all the official money events for the 1993 season. "Date" is the ending date of the tournament. The numbers in parentheses after the winners' names are the number of wins they had on the tour up to and including that event. Majors are shown in bold.

| Date | Tournament | Location | Winner | Score | Purse ($) | 1st prize ($) |
|---|---|---|---|---|---|---|
| Feb 7 | HealthSouth Palm Beach Classic | Florida | (United States) Tammie Green (2) | 208 (−8) | 400,000 | 60,000 |
| Feb 20 | Itoki Hawaiian Ladies Open | Hawaii | (Canada) Lisa Walters (2) | 210 (−6) | 450,000 | 67,500 |
| Mar 14 | Ping/Welch's Championship | Arizona | (United States) Meg Mallon (5) | 272 (−16) | 400,000 | 60,000 |
| Mar 21 | Standard Register PING | Arizona | (United States) Patty Sheehan (30) | 275 (−17) | 700,000 | 105,000 |
| Mar 28 | **Nabisco Dinah Shore** | California | (Sweden) **Helen Alfredsson (1)** | 284 (−4) | 700,000 | 105,000 |
| Apr 4 | Las Vegas LPGA | Nevada | (England) Trish Johnson (1) | 209 (−7) | 450,000 | 67,500 |
| Apr 18 | Atlanta Women's Championship | Georgia | (England) Trish Johnson (2) | 282 (−6) | 600,000 | 90,000 |
| May 2 | Sprint Classic | Florida | (United States) Kristi Albers (1) | 279 (−9) | 1,200,000 | 180,000 |
| May 9 | Sara Lee Classic | Tennessee | (United States) Meg Mallon (6) | 205 (−11) | 525,000 | 78,750 |
| May 16 | McDonald's Championship | Delaware | (England) Laura Davies (6) | 277 (−7) | 900,000 | 135,000 |
| May 23 | Lady Keystone Open | Pennsylvania | (United States) Val Skinner (4) | 210 (−6) | 400,000 | 60,000 |
| May 30 | LPGA Corning Classic | New York | (United States) Kelly Robbins (1) | 277 (−11) | 500,000 | 75,000 |
| Jun 6 | Oldsmobile Classic | Michigan | (United States) Jane Geddes (10) | 277 (−11) | 550,000 | 82,500 |
| Jun 13 | **Mazda LPGA Championship** | Maryland | (United States) **Patty Sheehan (31)** | 275 (−9) | 1,000,000 | 150,000 |
| Jun 20 | Rochester International | New York | (United States) Tammie Green (3) | 276 (−12) | 500,000 | 75,000 |
| Jun 27 | ShopRite LPGA Classic | New Jersey | (United States) Shelley Hamlin (3) | 204 (−9) | 450,000 | 67,500 |
| Jul 4 | Jamie Farr Toledo Classic | Ohio | (United States) Brandie Burton (2) | 201 (−12) | 450,000 | 67,500 |
| Jul 11 | Youngstown-Warren LPGA Classic | Ohio | (United States) Nancy Lopez (47) | 203 (−13) | 500,000 | 75,000 |
| Jul 18 | JAL Big Apple Classic | New York | (Japan) Hiromi Kobayashi (1) | 278 (−6) | 600,000 | 90,000 |
| Jul 25 | **U.S. Women's Open** | Indiana | (United States) **Lauri Merten (3)** | 280 (−8) | 800,000 | 144,000 |
| Aug 1 | PING/Welch's Championship | Massachusetts | (United States) Missie Berteotti (1) | 276 (−12) | 450,000 | 67,500 |
| Aug 8 | McCall's LPGA Classic | Vermont | (United States) Dana Lofland-Dormann (2) | 275 (−13) | 500,000 | 75,000 |
| Aug 15 | Sun-Times Challenge | Illinois | (United States) Cindy Schreyer (1) | 272 (−16) | 475,000 | 71,250 |
| Aug 22 | Minnesota LPGA Classic | Minnesota | (Japan) Hiromi Kobayashi (2) | 205 (−11) | 450,000 | 67,500 |
| Aug 29 | **du Maurier Ltd. Classic** | Canada | (United States) **Brandie Burton (3)** | 277 (−11) | 800,000 | 120,000 |
| Sep 6 | State Farm Rail Classic | Illinois | (England) Helen Dobson (1) | 203 (−13) | 500,000 | 75,000 |
| Sep 12 | Ping-Cellular One LPGA Golf Championship | Oregon | (United States) Donna Andrews (1) | 208 (−8) | 450,000 | 67,500 |
| Sep 19 | Safeco Classic | Washington | (United States) Brandie Burton (4) | 274 (−14) | 450,000 | 67,500 |
| Sep 26 | Kyocera Inamori Classic | California | (United States) Kris Monaghan (2) | 275 (−13) | 425,000 | 63,750 |
| Oct 17 | World Championship of Women's Golf | Florida | (United States) Dottie Mochrie (7) | 283 (−5) | 400,000 | 102,500 |
| Nov 7 | Toray Japan Queens Cup | Japan | (United States) Betsy King (29) | 205 (−11) | 650,000 | 97,500 |

== Awards ==
| Award | Winner | Country |
|---|---|---|
| Money winner | Betsy King (3) | United States |
| Scoring leader (Vare Trophy) | Betsy King (2) | United States |
| Player of the Year | Betsy King (3) | United States |
| Rookie of the Year | Suzanne Strudwick | England |
