= Dana Dormann =

American professional golfer (born 1967)

Personal information
- Full name: Dana Lofland Dormann
- Nationality: United States
- Born: September 16, 1967 (age 59) Oxnard, California, U.S.
- Height: 5 ft 9 in (1.75 m)

Career
- Sport: Golf
- College: San Jose State University
- Status: Professional
- Former tour: LPGA Tour (1991–2000)
- Professional wins: 2

Number of wins by tour
- LPGA Tour: 2

Best results in LPGA major championships
- Chevron Championship: T11: 1994
- Women's PGA C'ship: T11: 1997
- U.S. Women's Open: T26: 1998
- du Maurier Classic: 7th: 1993
- Women's British Open: DNP

Dana Lofland Dormann (born September 16, 1967) is an American professional golfer who played on the LPGA Tour. She also played under her maiden name Dana Lofland and as Dana Lofland-Dormann.

== Career ==
In 1985, Lofland won the U.S. Girls' Junior and the Junior World Golf Championships (Girls 15–17).

Dormann won twice on the LPGA Tour in 1992 and 1993.

Dormann is the assistant head coach of the San Jose State University's woman's golf team and her husband John is the head coach. She is also a teaching pro at the Pleasanton Golf Center in Pleasanton, California.

== Professional wins (2) ==
=== LPGA Tour wins (2) ===
No.	Date	Tournament	Winning score	Margin of victory	Runner(s)-up
1	Apr 4, 1992	Las Vegas LPGA International	–4 (70-71-71=212)	2 strokes	(United States) Missie Berteotti (United States) Beth Daniel (United States) Judy Dickinson
2	Aug 8, 1993	McCall's LPGA Classic	–13 (63-73-70-69=275)	1 stroke	(United States) Donna Andrews

LPGA Tour playoff record (0–1)

No.	Year	Tournament	Opponent	Result
1	1998	Cup Noodles Hawaiian Ladies Open	(United States) Wendy Ward	Lost to par on first extra hole

== Team appearances ==
Amateur

- Curtis Cup (representing the United States): 1984 (winners)
