= 1994 LPGA Tour =

Golf tour season

1994 LPGA Tour season
- Duration: February 4, 1994 – November 6, 1994
- Number of official events: 32
- Most wins: 4 (United States) Beth Daniel
- Money leader: (England) Laura Davies
- Player of the Year: (United States) Beth Daniel
- Vare Trophy: (United States) Beth Daniel
- Rookie of the Year: (Sweden) Annika Sörenstam

The 1994 LPGA Tour was the 45th season since the LPGA Tour officially began in 1950. The season ran from February 4 to November 6. The season consisted of 32 official money events. Beth Daniel won the most tournaments, four. Laura Davies led the money list with earnings of $687,201.

There were five first-time winners in 1994: Marta Figueras-Dotti, Carolyn Hill, Lisa Kiggens, Woo-Soon Ko, and Missie McGeorge.

The tournament results and award winners are listed below.

== Tournament results ==
The following table shows all the official money events for the 1994 season. "Date" is the ending date of the tournament. The numbers in parentheses after the winners' names are the number of wins they had on the tour up to and including that event. Majors are shown in bold.

| Date | Tournament | Location | Winner | Score | Purse ($) | 1st prize ($) |
|---|---|---|---|---|---|---|
| Feb 6 | HealthSouth Palm Beach Classic | Florida | (Canada) Dawn Coe-Jones (2) | 201 (−15) | 400,000 | 60,000 |
| Feb 19 | Cup Noodles Hawaiian Ladies Open | Hawaii | (Spain) Marta Figueras-Dotti (1) | 209 (−7) | 500,000 | 75,000 |
| Mar 5 | Chrysler-Plymouth Tournament of Champions | Florida | (United States) Dottie Mochrie (8) | 287 (−1) | 700,000 | 115,000 |
| Mar 13 | Ping/Welch's Championship | Arizona | (United States) Donna Andrews (2) | 276 (−12) | 425,000 | 63,750 |
| Mar 20 | Standard Register PING | Arizona | (England) Laura Davies (7) | 277 (−15) | 700,000 | 105,000 |
| Mar 27 | **Nabisco Dinah Shore** | California | (United States) **Donna Andrews (3)** | 276 (−12) | 700,000 | 105,000 |
| Apr 17 | Atlanta Women's Championship | Georgia | (United States) Val Skinner (5) | 206 (−10) | 650,000 | 97,500 |
| May 1 | Sprint Championship | Florida | (United States) Sherri Steinhauer (2) | 273 (−15) | 1,200,000 | 180,000 |
| May 8 | Sara Lee Classic | Tennessee | (England) Laura Davies (8) | 203 (−13) | 525,000 | 78,750 |
| May 15 | **McDonald's LPGA Championship** | Delaware | (England) **Laura Davies (9)** | 279 (−5) | 1,100,000 | 165,000 |
| May 22 | Lady Keystone Open | Pennsylvania | (United States) Elaine Crosby (2) | 211 (−5) | 400,000 | 60,000 |
| May 29 | LPGA Corning Classic | New York | (United States) Beth Daniel (28) | 278 (−10) | 500,000 | 75,000 |
| Jun 5 | Oldsmobile Classic | Michigan | (United States) Beth Daniel (29) | 268 (−20) | 600,000 | 90,000 |
| Jun 12 | Minnesota LPGA Classic | Minnesota | (Sweden) Liselotte Neumann (3) | 205 (−11) | 500,000 | 75,000 |
| Jun 19 | Rochester International | New York | (United States) Lisa Kiggens (1) | 273 (−15) | 500,000 | 75,000 |
| Jun 26 | ShopRite LPGA Classic | New Jersey | (United States) Donna Andrews (4) | 207 (−6) | 500,000 | 75,000 |
| Jul 3 | Youngstown-Warren LPGA Classic | Ohio | (United States) Tammie Green (4) | 206 (−10) | 550,000 | 82,500 |
| Jul 10 | Jamie Farr Toledo Classic | Ohio | (United States) Kelly Robbins (2) | 204 (−9) | 500,000 | 75,000 |
| Jul 17 | JAL Big Apple Classic | New York | (United States) Beth Daniel (30) | 276 (−8) | 650,000 | 97,500 |
| Jul 24 | **U.S. Women's Open** | Michigan | (United States) **Patty Sheehan (32)** | 277 (−7) | 850,000 | 155,000 |
| Jul 31 | PING/Welch's Championship | Massachusetts | (Sweden) Helen Alfredsson (2) | 274 (−14) | 450,000 | 67,500 |
| Aug 7 | McCall's LPGA Classic | Vermont | (United States) Carolyn Hill (1) | 275 (−13) | 500,000 | 75,000 |
| Aug 14 | Weetabix Women's British Open | England | (Sweden) Liselotte Neumann (4) | 280 (−12) | 500,000 | 80,325 |
| Aug 14 | Children's Medical Center LPGA Classic | Ohio | (United States) Maggie Will (3) | 210 (−6) | 350,000 | 52,500 |
| Aug 21 | Chicago Challenge | Illinois | (United States) Jane Geddes (11) | 272 (−16) | 500,000 | 75,000 |
| Aug 28 | **du Maurier Ltd. Classic** | Canada | (United States) **Martha Nause (3)** | 279 (−9) | 800,000 | 120,000 |
| Sep 5 | State Farm Rail Classic | Illinois | (United States) Barb Mucha (3) | 203 (−13) | 525,000 | 78,750 |
| Sep 11 | Ping-Cellular One LPGA Golf Championship | Oregon | (United States) Missie McGeorge (1) | 207 (−9) | 500,000 | 75,000 |
| Sep 18 | Safeco Classic | Washington | (United States) Deb Richard (4) | 276 (−12) | 500,000 | 75,000 |
| Oct 1 | GHP Heartland Classic | Missouri | (Sweden) Liselotte Neumann (5) | 278 (−10) | 500,000 | 75,000 |
| Oct 17 | World Championship of Women's Golf | Florida | (United States) Beth Daniel (31) | 274 (−14) | 425,000 | 105,000 |
| Nov 6 | Toray Japan Queens Cup | Japan | (South Korea) Woo-Soon Ko (1*) | 205 (−7) | 700,000 | 105,000 |

* – non-member at time of win

== Awards ==
| Award | Winner | Country |
|---|---|---|
| Money winner | Laura Davies | England |
| Scoring leader (Vare Trophy) | Beth Daniel (3) | United States |
| Player of the Year | Beth Daniel (3) | United States |
| Rookie of the Year | Annika Sörenstam | Sweden |
