= 1991 LPGA Championship =

Coordinates: 39.015°N 77.152°W

1991 Mazda LPGA Championship
Tournament information
- Dates: June 27–30, 1991
- Location: Bethesda, Maryland
- Course: Bethesda Country Club
- Tour: LPGA Tour
- Format: Stroke play - 72 holes

Statistics
- Par: 71
- Length: 6,246 yards (5,711 m)
- Cut: 147 (+5)
- Prize fund: $1.0 million
- Winner's share: $150,000

Champion
- (United States) Meg Mallon
- 274 (−10)

Location in the United States
Location in Maryland

The 1991 Mazda LPGA Championship was the 37th LPGA Championship, played June 27–30 at Bethesda Country Club in Bethesda, Maryland, a suburb northwest of Washington, D.C.

Meg Mallon shot a final round 67 (−4) to win the first of her four major titles, one stroke ahead of runners-up Pat Bradley and Ayako Okamoto. All three were tied for the lead at 207 (−6) after 54 holes, and played in the final grouping on Sunday. They came to the final hole tied at nine under par; all three put their drives in the fairway and had putts for birdie, but only Mallon converted. She won the U.S. Women's Open two weeks later.

This was the second of four consecutive LPGA Championships at Bethesda Country Club.

== Round summaries ==
=== First round ===
Thursday, June 27, 1991

| Place | Player | Score | To Par |
|---|---|---|---|
| 1 | (United States) Deborah McHaffie | 66 | −5 |
| T2 | (United States) Barb Mucha | 67 | −4 |
| T2 | (United States) Deb Richard | 67 | −4 |
| T2 | (United States) Colleen Walker | 67 | −4 |
| T5 | (United States) Pat Bradley | 68 | −3 |
| T5 | (United States) Nina Foust | 68 | −3 |
| T5 | (United States) Meg Mallon | 68 | −3 |
| T8 | (United States) Amy Alcott | 69 | −2 |
| T8 | (United States) Judy Dickinson | 69 | −2 |
| T8 | (United States) Michelle Estill | 69 | −2 |
| T8 | (United States) Vicki Fergon | 69 | −2 |
| T8 | (Spain) Marta Figueras-Dotti | 69 | −2 |
| T8 | (United States) Shirley Furlong | 69 | −2 |
| T8 | (United States) Jane Geddes | 69 | −2 |
| T8 | (United States) Rosie Jones | 69 | −2 |
| T8 | (United States) Betsy King | 69 | −2 |
| T8 | (Japan) Hiromi Kobayashi | 69 | −2 |
| T8 | (United States) Hollis Stacy | 69 | −2 |

=== Second round ===
Friday, June 28, 1991

| Place | Player | Score | To Par |
|---|---|---|---|
| 1 | (Japan) Ayako Okamoto | 70-64=134 | −8 |
| T2 | (United States) Pat Bradley | 68-68=136 | −6 |
| T2 | (United States) Meg Mallon | 68-68=136 | −6 |
| 4 | (United States) Deb Richard | 67-70=137 | −5 |
| T5 | (United States) Barb Bunkowsky | 70-68=138 | −4 |
| T5 | (United States) Rosie Jones | 69-69=138 | −4 |
| T7 | (United States) Amy Alcott | 69-70=139 | −3 |
| T7 | (United States) Shirley Furlong | 69-70=139 | −3 |
| T9 | (United States) JoAnne Carner | 71-70=141 | −1 |
| T9 | (United States) Beth Daniel | 71-70=141 | −1 |
| T9 | (United States) Vicki Fergon | 71-70=141 | −1 |
| T9 | (United States) Debbie Massey | 70-71=141 | −1 |
| T9 | (United States) Colleen Walker | 67-74=141 | −1 |

=== Third round ===
Saturday, June 29, 1991

| Place | Player | Score | To Par |
|---|---|---|---|
| T1 | (United States) Pat Bradley | 68-68-71=207 | −6 |
| T1 | (United States) Meg Mallon | 68-68-71=207 | −6 |
| T1 | (Japan) Ayako Okamoto | 70-64-73=207 | −6 |
| 4 | (United States) Barb Bunkowsky | 70-68-70=208 | −5 |
| T5 | (United States) Beth Daniel | 71-70-68=209 | −4 |
| T5 | (United States) Deb Richard | 67-70-72=209 | −4 |
| 7 | (United States) Amy Alcott | 69-70-71=210 | −3 |
| T8 | (United States) JoAnne Carner | 71-70-70=211 | −2 |
| T8 | (United States) Michelle Estill | 69-75-67=211 | −2 |
| T8 | (United States) Betsy King | 69-75-67=211 | −2 |
| T8 | (United States) Sherri Steinhauer | 71-71-69=211 | −2 |

=== Final round ===
Sunday, June 30, 1991

| Place | Player | Score | To Par | Prize money ($) |
|---|---|---|---|---|
| 1 | (United States) Meg Mallon | 68-68-71-67=274 | −10 | 150,000 |
| T2 | (United States) Pat Bradley | 68-68-71-68=275 | −9 | 80,000 |
| T2 | (Japan) Ayako Okamoto | 70-64-73-68=275 | −9 | 80,000 |
| 4 | (United States) Beth Daniel | 71-70-68-69=278 | −6 | 52,500 |
| T5 | (United States) Barb Bunkowsky | 70-68-70-71=279 | −5 | 38,750 |
| T5 | (United States) Deb Richard | 67-70-72-70=279 | −5 | 38,750 |
| 7 | (United States) Betsy King | 69-75-67-70=281 | −3 | 29,500 |
| 8 | (United States) JoAnne Carner | 71-70-70-71=282 | −2 | 26,000 |
| 9 | (United States) Juli Inkster | 72-70-71-70=283 | −1 | 23,500 |
| 10 | (United States) Amy Alcott | 69-70-71-74=284 | E | 21,00 |
