= 1993 Nabisco Dinah Shore =

Coordinates: 33.798°N 116.433°W

Tournament information
- Dates: March 25–28, 1993
- Location: Rancho Mirage, California
- Courses: Mission Hills Country Club; Old Course (Dinah Shore Tourn. Course)
- Tour: LPGA Tour
- Format: Stroke play – 72 holes

Statistics
- Par: 72
- Length: 6,437 yards (5,886 m)
- Field: 107 players, 80 after cut
- Cut: 151 (+7)
- Prize fund: $700,000
- Winner's share: $105,000

Champion
- (Sweden) Helen Alfredsson
- 284 (−4)

Location in the United States
Location in California

The 1993 Nabisco Dinah Shore was a women's professional golf tournament, held March 25–28 at Mission Hills Country Club in Rancho Mirage, California. This was the 22nd edition of the Nabisco Dinah Shore, and the eleventh as a major championship.

Helen Alfredsson won her only major title, two strokes ahead of three runners-up. From Sweden, she was the first non-American to win the event as a major. Alfredsson was the rookie of the year the previous season; this was the first of her seven wins on the LPGA Tour.

== Final leaderboard ==
Sunday, March 28, 1993

Place	Player	Score	To par	Money ($)
1	(Sweden) Helen Alfredsson	69-71-72-72=284	−4	105,000
T2	(United States) Tina Barrett	70-73-72-71=286	−2	49,901
T2	(United States) Amy Benz	72-73-71-70=286	−2	49,901
T2	(United States) Betsy King	71-74-67-74=286	−2	49,901
T5	(United States) Missie Berteotti	68-74-73-72=287	−1	25,126
T5	(Canada) Dawn Coe-Jones	72-68-72-75=287	−1	25,126
T5	(United States) Hollis Stacy	72-74-71-70=287	−1	25,126
T8	(United States) Brandie Burton	73-73-68-74=288	E	15,762
T8	(United States) Jane Crafter	71-72-70-75=288	E	15,762
T8	(England) Trish Johnson	74-68-72-74=288	E	15,762
T8	(United States) Nancy Lopez	68-78-72-70=288	E	15,762
