= Lisa Walters =

Canadian professional golfer (born 1960)

Personal information
- Full name: Lisa Young Walters
- Nationality: Canada
- Born: January 9, 1960 (age 66) Prince Rupert, British Columbia, Canada
- Height: 5 ft 7 in (1.70 m)

Career
- Sport: Golf
- College: Florida State University
- Status: Professional
- Former tour: LPGA Tour (1984–1998)
- Professional wins: 3

Number of wins by tour
- LPGA Tour: 3

Best results in LPGA major championships
- Chevron Championship: T17: 1987
- Women's PGA C'ship: 5th: 1984
- U.S. Women's Open: T19: 1998
- du Maurier Classic: T31: 1994
- Women's British Open: CUT: 2005

Achievements and awards
- Canadian Golf Hall of Fame: 2008

Lisa Walters (born January 9, 1960) is a Canadian professional golfer who played on the LPGA Tour. She competed under her maiden name Lisa Young until 1988.

== Career ==
Young was born in Prince Rupert, British Columbia in 1960. She won several amateur tournaments in British Columbia including three straight British Columbia Ladies' Championships. She played college golf at Florida State University where she was an All-American in 1981.

In 1984, Walters joined the LPGA Tour. She won three times between 1992 and 1998.

== Awards and honors ==
In 2008, Walters was inducted into the Canadian Golf Hall of Fame.

== Amateur wins ==
- 1977 British Columbia Junior Championship
- 1979 British Columbia Ladies' Championship
- 1980 British Columbia Ladies' Championship
- 1981 British Columbia Ladies' Championship

== Professional wins ==
=== LPGA Tour wins (3) ===
No.	Date	Tournament	Winning score	Margin of victory	Runner(s)-up
1	Feb 22, 1992	Itoki Hawaiian Ladies Open	–8 (72-71-65=208)	1 stroke	(United States) Kristi Albers (United States) Missie Berteotti
2	Feb 20, 1993	Itoki Hawaiian Ladies Open	–6 (68-68-74=210)	1 stroke	(United States) Nancy Lopez
3	Jun 14, 1998	Oldsmobile Classic	–23 (67-67-65-66=265)	6 strokes	(United States) Donna Andrews
