= Deb Richard =

American professional golfer (born 1963)

Personal information
- Nationality: United States
- Born: June 3, 1963 (age 63) Abbeville, Louisiana, U.S.
- Height: 5 ft 6 in (168 cm)

Career
- Sport: Golf
- College: University of Florida
- Turned professional: 1986
- Former tour: LPGA Tour (1986–2005)
- Professional wins: 6

Number of wins by tour
- LPGA Tour: 5
- Other: 1

Best results in LPGA major championships
- Chevron Championship: T10: 1996
- Women's PGA C'ship: T5: 1991
- U.S. Women's Open: T9: 1986
- du Maurier Classic: T4: 1988, 1998
- Women's British Open: CUT: 2003, 2004

Achievements and awards
- Broderick Award: 1985

Deb Richard (born June 3, 1963) is an American former professional golfer who was a member of the LPGA Tour for twenty years during the 1980s, 1990s and 2000s.

== Early life ==
Richard was born in Abbeville, Louisiana in 1963. She was raised in Manhattan, Kansas.

Richard first found success as an amateur golfer by winning the Kansas state high school golf championship three consecutive years for Manhattan High School (1979–1981). In the summer of 1982, she won the Kansas Women's Amateur for the first time.

== Amateur career ==
While competing for coach Mimi Ryan's Florida Gators women's golf team at the University of Florida from 1982 to 1985, she won seven tournaments including three consecutive Southeastern Conference (SEC) individual championships. As a senior in 1985, she was the individual runner-up, by a single stroke, at the NCAA Women's Golf Championship.

She also won a number of other prestigious tournaments during the era. In 1983, she won the Kansas Amateur again. In 1984, Richard won the prestigious U.S. Women's Amateur; a few months later she was part of the U.S. team that won the Espirito Santo Trophy in Hong Kong.

In 1985, she graduated from Florida with a bachelor's degree in advertising.

== Professional career ==
Richard played on the LPGA Tour for twenty years (1986–2005), during which she won five Tour events and finished in the top-10 in over seventy events. Her five wins included: the 1987 Rochester International, 1991 Women's Kemper Open, 1991 The Phar-Mor in Youngstown, 1994 Safeco Classic and 1997 Friendly's Classic. Her best finishes in the LPGA majors included a tie for tenth place in the 1996 Kraft Nabisco Championship, a tie for fifth in the 1991 LPGA Championship, a tie for ninth in the 1986 U.S. Women's Open, and ties for fourth in the 1988 and 1998 du Maurier Classic. In 1992, Richard was selected for the U.S. Solheim Cup team. Her career earning as a professional golfer totaled $2,759,551.

She has also received a number of awards for her charitable activities.

== Awards and honors ==
- While at University of Florida, Richard was a first-team All-SEC selection all four years and a first-team All-American her junior and senior years.
- In 1985, during her senior year, she was recognized as the SEC Golfer of the Year,
- In 1985, she also won the Broderick Award as the nation's outstanding female collegiate golfer.
- Richard has been inducted into the Kansas Golf Hall of Fame.
- In 1995, she was inducted into the University of Florida Athletic Hall of Fame as a "Gator Great."

== Professional wins (6) ==
=== LPGA Tour wins (5) ===
No.	Date	Tournament	Winning score	Margin of victory	Runner(s)-up
1	Jun 28, 1987	Rochester International	–8 (66-69-73-72=280)	2 strokes	(United States) Amy Alcott (United States) Shirley Furlong (United States) Lori Garbacz (United States) Laurie Rinker
2	Mar 2, 1991	Women's Kemper Open	–9 (68-70-67-70=275)	Playoff	(United States) Cindy Rarick
3	Aug 4, 1991	The Phar-Mor in Youngstown	–9 (70-69-68=207)	Playoff	(United States) Jane Geddes
4	Sep 18, 1994	Safeco Classic	–12 (71-68-70-67=276)	1 stroke	(United States) Michelle Estill (United States) Tammie Green (United States) Christa Johnson (United States) Rosie Jones
5	Aug 10, 1997	Friendly's Classic	–11 (72-70-68-67=277)	1 stroke	(United States) Christa Johnson

LPGA Tour playoff record (2–2)

No.	Year	Tournament	Opponent	Result
1	1991	Women's Kemper Open	(United States) Cindy Rarick	Won with birdie on second extra hole
2	1991	Jamie Farr Toledo Classic	(United States) Alice Miller	Lost to birdie on third extra hole
3	1991	The Phar-Mor in Youngstown	(United States) Jane Geddes	Won with birdie on first extra hole
4	1993	Youngstown-Warren LPGA Classic	(United States) Nancy Lopez	Lost to birdie on first extra hole

=== Other wins (1) ===
- 1991 JBP Cup LPGA Match Play Championship

== U.S. national team appearances ==
Amateur

- Espirito Santo Trophy: 1984 (winners)

Professional

- Solheim Cup: 1992

== See also ==
- List of Florida Gators women's golfers on the LPGA Tour
- List of University of Florida alumni
- List of University of Florida Athletic Hall of Fame members
