= The Home Course =

Coordinates: 47.1052788°N 122.666561°W

- Interactive map of The Home Course

Club information
- Location: DuPont, Washington, U.S.
- Established: 2007
- Type: Public
- Owner: Washington State Golf Association / Pacific Northwest Golf Association
- Tota holes: 18
- Tournaments: 2010 U.S. Amateur (companion course to Chambers Bay); 2014 U.S. Women's Amateur Public Links
- Website: http://thehomecourse.com/

The Home Course is a public golf course owned and operated by the Washington State Golf Association and Pacific Northwest Golf Association, located in DuPont, Washington, just south of Tacoma. The Home Course is often referred to as "The Home of Golf in the Northwest" and has hosted a number of championships over the years including the 2014 U.S. Women's Amateur Public Links, along with being the companion course to Chambers Bay for the 2010 U.S. Amateur.

== Course Design ==
The Home Course was designed by golf course architect Mike Asmundson, and opened for play in the summer of 2007. It is located on the site of a former dynamite manufacturing plant that was operated by the DuPont company, and after which the city of DuPont was named. The Home Course has five different sets of tees ranging from 7,424 yards at the longest to 5,470 yards at the shortest. The Home Course also has a set of tees for beginners, called the Little Home Course.

== Course Scorecard ==
=== Dynamite Tees ===
The DuPont Nine				The Weyerhauser Nine			
Hole	Name	Par	Yards	Hole	Name	Par	Yards
1	Apple Tree	4	451	10	Narrow Gauge	5	569
2	Olympics	4	405	11	Asmundson's Challenge	4	340
3	Sound View	4	413	12	Redan	3	214
4	The Armory	3	218	13	Head Wind	4	466
5	Four Maples	5	654	14	Rhododendrons	3	196
6	Sequalitchew	3	209	15	Buried Bunkers	4	433
7	Rainier	4	434	16	The Works	5	559
8	Nisqually	5	561	17	Anderson Island	4	400
9	Old Fort	4	432	18	Homeward Bound	4	470
Out		36	3,777	In		36	3,647
Rating: 76.4 Slope: 138				Total		72	7,424

=== Black Tees ===
The DuPont Nine				The Weyerhauser Nine			
Hole	Name	Par	Yards	Hole	Name	Par	Yards
1	Apple Tree	4	413	10	Narrow Gauge	5	560
2	Olympics	4	405	11	Asmundson's Challenge	4	332
3	Sound View	4	385	12	Redan	3	208
4	The Armory	3	200	13	Head Wind	4	439
5	Four Maples	5	582	14	Rhododendrons	3	196
6	Sequalitchew	3	186	15	Buried Bunkers	4	412
7	Rainier	4	389	16	The Works	5	520
8	Nisqually	5	552	17	Anderson Island	4	387
9	Old Fort	4	419	18	Homeward Bound	4	452
Out		36	3,531	In		36	3,506
Rating: 74.5 Slope: 137				Total		72	7,037

=== Blue Tees ===
The DuPont Nine				The Weyerhauser Nine			
Hole	Name	Par	Yards	Hole	Name	Par	Yards
1	Apple Tree	4	369	10	Narrow Gauge	5	515
2	Olympics	4	367	11	Asmundson's Challenge	4	310
3	Sound View	4	373	12	Redan	3	191
4	The Armory	3	191	13	Head Wind	4	430
5	Four Maples	5	556	14	Rhododendrons	3	177
6	Sequalitchew	3	186	15	Buried Bunkers	4	403
7	Rainier	4	375	16	The Works	5	500
8	Nisqually	5	520	17	Anderson Island	4	336
9	Old Fort	4	390	18	Homeward Bound	4	410
Out		36	3,327	In		36	3,272
Rating: 72.4 Slope: 135				Total		72	6,599

=== White Tees ===
The DuPont Nine				The Weyerhauser Nine			
Hole	Name	Par	Yards	Hole	Name	Par	Yards
1	Apple Tree	4	339	10	Narrow Gauge	5	515
2	Olympics	4	353	11	Asmundson's Challenge	4	301
3	Sound View	4	335	12	Redan	3	169
4	The Armory	3	147	13	Head Wind	4	404
5	Four Maples	5	469	14	Rhododendrons	3	157
6	Sequalitchew	3	156	15	Buried Bunkers	4	365
7	Rainier	4	339	16	The Works	5	470
8	Nisqually	5	520	17	Anderson Island	4	319
9	Old Fort	4	352	18	Homeward Bound	4	378
Out		36	3,010	In		36	3,078
Men's Rating: 69.9 Slope: 127 Women's Rating: 75.4 Slope: 133				Total		72	6,088

=== Gold Tees ===
The DuPont Nine				The Weyerhauser Nine			
Hole	Name	Par	Yards	Hole	Name	Par	Yards
1	Apple Tree	4	312	10	Narrow Gauge	5	432
2	Olympics	4	324	11	Asmundson's Challenge	4	274
3	Sound View	4	297	12	Redan	3	130
4	The Armory	3	123	13	Head Wind	4	340
5	Four Maples	5	458	14	Rhododendrons	3	119
6	Sequalitchew	3	123	15	Buried Bunkers	4	298
7	Rainier	4	325	16	The Works	5	460
8	Nisqually	5	466	17	Anderson Island	4	282
9	Old Fort	4	331	18	Homeward Bound	4	348
Out		36	2,759	In		36	2,683
Men's Rating: 67.1 Slope: 121 Women's Rating: 71.8 Slope: 126				Total		72	5,442

=== Little Home Course ===
The DuPont Nine				The Weyerhauser Nine			
Hole	Name	Par	Yards	Hole	Name	Par	Yards
1	Apple Tree	4	146	10	Narrow Gauge	5	200
2	Olympics	4	95	11	Asmundson's Challenge	4	85
3	Sound View	4	125	12	Redan	3	83
4	The Armory	3	70	13	Head Wind	4	150
5	Four Maples	5	270	14	Rhododendrons	3	70
6	Sequalitchew	3	113	15	Buried Bunkers	4	100
7	Rainier	4	95	16	The Works	5	130
8	Nisqually	5	151	17	Anderson Island	4	155
9	Old Fort	4	85	18	Homeward Bound	4	116
Out		36	1,150	In		36	1,089
Total						72	2,239

All hole names retrieved from: http://thehomecourse.com/golf/hole-by-hole/
