= 1998 du Maurier Classic =

Coordinates: 42.220°N 83.080°W

The 1998 du Maurier Classic was contested from July 30 to August 2 at Essex Golf & Country Club. It was the 26th edition of the du Maurier Classic, and the 20th edition as a major championship on the LPGA Tour.

This event was won by Brandie Burton.

== Final leaderboard ==
Place	Player	Score	To par	Money (US$)
1	(United States) Brandie Burton	68-64-66-72=270	−18	180,000
2	(Sweden) Annika Sörenstam	68-66-67-70=271	−17	111,711
3	(United States) Betsy King	64-69-70-72=275	−13	81,519
T4	(Canada) Dawn Coe-Jones	67-70-69-70=276	−12	44,804
T4	(Canada) Gail Graham	70-70-68-68=276	−12	44,804
T4	(United States) Michelle Estill	69-69-66-72=276	−12	44,804
T4	(United States) Meg Mallon	65-69-67-75=276	−12	44,804
T4	(United States) Deb Richard	67-69-70-70=276	−12	44,804
T9	(Japan) Hiromi Kobayashi	68-70-66-73=277	−11	26,871
T9	(United States) Sherri Steinhauer	70-71-69-67=277	−11	26,871
