= Rianne Malixi =

Filipino golfer (born 2007)

Personal information
- Full name: Rianne Mikhaela Malixi
- Nationality: Philippines
- Born: 10 March 2007 (age 19) Quezon City, Philippines

Career
- Sport: Golf
- College: Duke University
- Status: Amateur

Best results in LPGA major championships
- Chevron Championship: DNP
- Women's PGA C'ship: DNP
- U.S. Women's Open: CUT: 2025
- Women's British Open: DNP
- Evian Championship: CUT: 2025

Achievements and awards
- ACC Freshman of the Year: 2026
- WGCA National Freshman of the Year: 2026

Rianne Mikhaela Malixi (born 10 March 2007) is a Filipina amateur golfer and Duke Blue Devils women's golf player. In 2024, she won both the U.S. Girls' Junior and the U.S. Women's Amateur in the same year, only accomplished once before.

== Amateur career ==
Malixi won the 2019 Philippine Junior Amateur Open and the 2020 Philippine National Stroke Play Championship. In 2022, she finished runner-up in the Girls' Junior PGA Championship and tied for 3rd in the Women's Amateur Asia-Pacific.

In 2023, Malixi lost the final of the U.S. Girls' Junior to Kiara Romero, 1 up. She finished 3rd in both the Queen Sirikit Cup on home turf in the Philippines and at the Royal Junior in Japan. She represented the Philippines in both the Asian Games in China and the Women's World Amateur Team Championship for the Espirito Santo Trophy in Abu Dhabi.

In 2024, Malixi was runner-up at the Junior Invitational at Sage Valley in South Carolina. She secured the U.S. Girls' Junior with an 8 and 7 victory over Asterisk Talley in the 36-hole final match. Malixi became the second player in USGA history to win the U.S. Girls' Junior and U.S. Women's Amateur titles in the same year, only accomplished by Seong Eun-jeong in 2016.

Malixi finished 5th in the 2024 Korea Women's Open

== College career ==
Malixi enrolled at Duke University in 2025. Her first season she set the Duke Blue Devils women's golf team record for lowest stroke average (70.60). She was ACC Freshman of the Year and WGCA National Freshman of the Year, and was named to the WGCA Player of the Year watch list.

== Amateur wins ==
- 2019 Philippine Junior Amateur Open Championship, Northern Luzon Regional Amateur Championship
- 2020 Philippine National Stroke Play Championship
- 2021 Se Ri Pak Desert Junior
- 2022 SEA Games Qualifying - Stage 2, Singha Thailand Junior World Championship
- 2024 Australian Master of the Amateurs, U.S. Girls' Junior, U.S. Women's Amateur
- 2026 Sea Best Intercollegiate

== Results in LPGA majors ==
Results not in chronological order.

Tournament	2025
Chevron Championship	
U.S. Women's Open	CUT
Women's PGA Championship	
The Evian Championship	CUT
Women's British Open	

Did not play

CUT = missed the half-way cut

== Team appearances ==
Amateur

- South East Asian Games (representing the Philippines): 2021
- Queen Sirikit Cup (representing the Philippines): 2023
- Asian Games (representing the Philippines): 2023
- Espirito Santo Trophy (representing the Philippines): 2023, 2025
- Arnold Palmer Cup (representing the International team): 2026 (winners)
