= 1988 LPGA Championship =

Coordinates: 39.349°N 84.278°W

Tournament information
- Dates: May 19–22, 1988
- Location: Mason, Ohio
- Courses: Jack Nicklaus Golf Center; Grizzly Course
- Tour: LPGA Tour
- Format: Stroke play - 72 holes

Statistics
- Par: 72
- Length: 6,389 yards (5,842 m)
- Cut: 150 (+6)
- Prize fund: $350,000
- Winner's share: $52,500

Champion
- (United States) Sherri Turner
- 281 (−7)

Location in the United States
Location in Ohio

The 1988 LPGA Championship was held May 19–22 at Jack Nicklaus Golf Center at Kings Island in Mason, Ohio, a suburb northeast of Cincinnati. Played on the Grizzly Course, this was the 34th edition of the LPGA Championship.

Sherri Turner birdied the final two holes for a final round 67 and won her only major championship, one stroke ahead of runner-up Amy Alcott. Turner began the round six strokes behind Alcott, the 54-hole leader, in a tie for tenth place. It was the first of her three LPGA Tour wins.

== Final leaderboard ==
Sunday, May 22, 1988

Place	Player	Score	To par	Money ($)
1	(United States) Sherri Turner	70-71-73-67=281	−7	52,500
2	(United States) Amy Alcott	68-71-69-74=282	−6	32,375
T3	(United States) Amy Benz	70-71-69-74=284	−4	15,890
T3	(Spain) Marta Figueras-Dotti	74-70-71-69=284	−4	15,890
T3	(United States) Sally Little	72-71-69-72=284	−4	15,890
T3	(Japan) Ayako Okamoto	71-71-69-73=284	−4	15,890
T3	(United States) Kathy Postlewait	74-69-69-72=284	−4	15,890
8	(United States) Missie Berteotti	74-70-68-73=285	−3	9,100
T9	(United States) Judy Dickinson	74-69-69-74=286	−2	7,414
T9	(United States) Jane Geddes	73-70-70-73=286	−2	7,414
T9	(United States) Sally Quinlan	69-68-79-70=286	−2	7,414
