= JoJo Robertson =

American golf coach (born 1976/77)

Jennifer "JoJo" Robertson (born 1976 or 1977) is the women's golf coach for Texas Tech University since 2009. Her team were quarter-finalists at the 2015 NCAA Division I women's golf championship. Before joining Texas Tech, Robertson reached the semifinals of the 1991 U.S. Girls' Junior. She is tied for first with the most U.S. Women's Amateur Public Links wins with her 1995 and 1997 first-place finishes. Robertson reached the third round of the 1997 U.S. Women's Amateur and won the 1998 Curtis Cup with the American team. At LPGA majors, she was 59th at the 1998 U.S. Women's Open.

While competing as a professional golfer on the Futures Tour during the early 2000s, Robertson was tied for fifth at the 2002 Denver Futures Classic. She held assistant professional and assistant coaching positions between 1999 and 2009. Robertson primarily worked for New Mexico Military Institute and Purdue University during this time period. She was named All-American by the American Junior Golf Association in 1993 and All-Big 12 by the Big 12 Conference in 1999. Robertson was the 2009 Division I Assistant Coach of the Year for the Women's Golf Coaches Association.

== Early life and education ==
Robertson was born in Roswell, New Mexico during the late 1970s. She became interested in golf during her early childhood. Robertson played multiple sports during her early education and grew up with a sibling. In 1990, Robertson joined the Goddard High School girls golf team during grade eight.

As a member of the New Mexico Activities Association, she won that year's A-AAA championship. Robertson also won their AAAA division in 1993 and 1994. Robertson was tied for eighth at the Junior PGA Championship during 1991 and 1993. She reached the semifinals of the 1991 U.S. Girls' Junior. At the 1992 Girls Junior America's Cup, Robertson and the New Mexican team were third.

Her collegiate golf experience began in 1994 with Oklahoma State University. In 1995 and 1996, Robertson was second at the Big Eight Conference Women's Golf Championship. Her team was the event's champion both years. After the end of the Big Eight in 1996, the conference was renamed to the Big 12 Conference that year. Robertson's team was the 1999 Big 12 Women's Golf Championship winners. At the 1999 NCAA Division I women's golf championship, she was tied for 74th as part of Oklahoma State's twelfth-place finish. Robertson planned to work at the Roswell Public Health Office that year as an intern.

== Career ==
=== Playing career ===
At the U.S. Women's Amateur Public Links, she had first-place finishes during 1995 and 1997. She became tied for first with the most Public Links victories in 1997. After the event was disbanded in 2015, Robertson was one of five golfers who won the Public Links twice. Robertson reached the third round of the 1997 U.S. Women's Amateur. She finished in 59th place at the 1998 U.S. Women's Open as a LPGA majors player. Robertson was on the American team that won the 1998 Curtis Cup.

She became a professional golfer by 2000. Robertson joined the Futures Tour the following year. After continuing with the Futures in 2002, Robertson was tied for fifth at that year's Denver Futures Classic. That year, she ended her playing career.

=== Coaching career ===
For her assistant professional career, Robertson was with Spring River Golf Course between 1999 and 2000. Between 2002 and 2004, she continued her experience for New Mexico Military Institute. Robertson also worked for Purdue University during 2004. Robertson started her coaching career in 2004 with West Lafayette High School. She worked in girls golf that year.

Robertson was with Purdue's women's golf team between 2005 and 2009. She started her assistant coach position before ending her experience as their associate head coach. Robertson became the women's golf coach at Texas Tech University during 2009. At the 2015 NCAA Division I women's golf championship, her team were quarter-finalists. They were the runner-up at the 2021 Big 12 Women's Golf Championship.

== Honors and personal life ==
Robertson was named All-American by the American Junior Golf Association in 1993. She was on the first team as part of the All-Big 12 during 1999. Robertson was the 2009 Division I Assistant Coach of the Year for the Women's Golf Coaches Association. That year, she started a marriage.
