= 1988 du Maurier Classic =

Coordinates: 49.251136°N 122.877497°W

The 1988 du Maurier Classic was contested from June 30 to July 3 at Vancouver Golf Club in Coquitlam, British Columbia. It was the 16th edition of the du Maurier Classic, and the 10th edition as a major championship on the LPGA Tour.

This event was won by Sally Little.

== Final leaderboard ==
Place	Player	Score	To par	Money (US$)
1	(United States) Sally Little	74-65-69-71=279	−9	75,000
2	(England) Laura Davies	69-71-70-70=280	−8	46,250
3	(United States) Sherri Turner	68-72-70-72=282	−6	33,750
T4	(United States) Amy Alcott	72-70-71-72=285	−3	19,938
T4	(United States) Deb Richard	72-72-71-70=285	−3	19,938
T4	(United States) Nancy Scranton	72-74-71-68=285	−3	19,938
T4	(Australia) Jan Stephenson	70-72-73-70=285	−3	19,938
8	(United States) Rosie Jones	72-71-71-72=286	−2	13,000
T9	(South Korea) Ok-Hee Ku	74-72-71-70=287	−1	10,148
T9	(United States) Debbie Massey	72-68-73-74=287	−1	10,148
T9	(United States) Patti Rizzo	73-70-70-74=287	−1	10,148
T9	(United States) Colleen Walker	73-68-73-73=287	−1	10,148
