= Brandie Burton =

American professional golfer (born 1972)

Personal information
- Nationality: United States
- Born: January 8, 1972 (age 54) San Bernardino, California, U.S.
- Height: 5 ft 7 in (1.70 m)

Career
- Sport: Golf
- College: Arizona State University
- Turned professional: 1990
- Former tour: LPGA Tour (1991)
- Professional wins: 5

Number of wins by tour
- LPGA Tour: 5

Best results in LPGA major championships (wins: 2)
- Chevron Championship: T3: 1992, 1995
- Women's PGA C'ship: T10: 1992
- U.S. Women's Open: T3: 1996
- du Maurier Classic: Won: 1993, 1998
- Women's British Open: T15: 2001

Achievements and awards
- LPGA Tour Rookie of the Year: 1991
- LPGA Heather Farr Player Award: 2000

Brandie Burton (born January 8, 1972) is an American professional golfer. In October 2019, her induction into the Southern California Golf Association Hall of Fame was announced, noting that she competed in five Solheim Cups, recorded 88 top 10 finishes and became the youngest female golfer to surpass $1 million in career earnings.

== Early life and amateur career ==
In 1972, Burton was born in San Bernardino, California. She graduated from Eisenhower High School in Rialto, California in 1990. Burton won several amateur tournaments including the 1989 U.S. Girls' Junior. She also was runner-up in the 1989 U.S. Women's Amateur to Vicki Goetze. Burton played on the U.S. Curtis Cup team in 1990.

Burton played college golf at Arizona State University for one year (1989/1990), winning six tournaments.

== Professional career ==
In 1990, Burton turned professional. She earned her 1991 LPGA Tour through qualifying school. In 1991, Burton was LPGA Tour Rookie of the Year.

She has won five times on the tour, including two majors, the 1993 and 1998 du Maurier Classics. Burton's best finish on the money list is 3rd in 1993. She was a member of the U.S. Solheim Cup team five times: in 1992, 1994, 1996, 1998, and 2000.

== Awards and honors ==
- In 1991, Burton earned the LPGA Tour Rookie of the Year honors.
- In 2000, she earned the LPGA's Heather Farr Player Award.
- In 2019, she was inducted into the Southern California Golf Association Hall of Fame.

== Amateur wins ==
- 1987 Junior World Golf Championships (Girls 15–17)
- 1988 Junior PGA Championship
- 1989 Junior World Golf Championships (Girls 15–17), U.S. Girls' Junior
- 1990 North and South Women's Amateur, Broadmoor Championship

== Professional wins (5) ==
=== LPGA Tour wins (5) ===
Legend
LPGA Tour major championships (2)
Other LPGA Tour (3)

No.	Date	Tournament	Winning score	Margin of victory	Runner(s)-up
1	Mar 15, 1992	PING/Welch's Championship	−11 (71-69-69-68=277)	1 stroke	(United States) Beth Daniel (United States) Dale Eggeling
2	Jul 4, 1993	Jamie Farr Toledo Classic	−12 (68-66-67=201)	1 stroke	(United States) Hollis Stacy
3	Aug 29, 1993	du Maurier Classic	−11 (71-70-66-70=277)	Playoff	(United States) Betsy King
4	Sep 19, 1993	Safeco Classic	−14 (68-68-73-65=274)	1 stroke	(United States) Rosie Jones
5	Aug 2, 1998	du Maurier Classic	−18 (68-64-66-72=270)	1 stroke	(Sweden) Annika Sörenstam

LPGA Tour playoff record (1–2)

No.	Year	Tournament	Opponent(s)	Result
1	1992	Sara Lee Classic	(United States) Amy Benz (United States) Maggie Will	Will won with par on first extra hole
2	1993	du Maurier Classic	(United States) Betsy King	Won with birdie on first extra hole
3	1996	Edina Realty LPGA Classic	(Sweden) Carin Koch (Sweden) Liselotte Neumann (England) Suzanne Strudwick	Neumann won with birdie on third extra hole

== Major championships ==
=== Wins (2) ===
Year	Championship	Winning score	Margin	Runner-up
1993	du Maurier Classic	−11 (71-70-66-70=277)	Playoff^{1}	(United States) Betsy King
1998	du Maurier Classic	−18 (68-64-66-72=270)	1 stroke	(Sweden) Annika Sörenstam

^{1}Won in playoff by Burton 3–4.

=== Results timeline ===
Tournament	1988	1989	1990	1991	1992	1993	1994	1995	1996	1997	1998	1999	2000
Kraft Nabisco Championship			CUT		T3	T8	T5	T3	T6	T48	T50		T31
LPGA Championship				T59	T10	T37	T28	CUT	T63	T11	T68		CUT
U.S. Women's Open	T44	CUT	CUT	T8		T39	T43	T28	T3	T14	T15		CUT
du Maurier Classic				T12		1	T22	T53	CUT	T11	1		T18

Tournament	2001	2002	2003	2004	2005	2006	2007	2008	2009	2010
Kraft Nabisco Championship	T7	T62	T42	T24	T14	61	CUT			
LPGA Championship	T37	T25	T46	CUT		CUT	CUT		13	WD
U.S. Women's Open	T26	T32	CUT	CUT		CUT			WD	
Women's British Open ^	T15	T29	T24	CUT	T22					

^ The Women's British Open replaced the du Maurier Classic as an LPGA major in 2001

Win
Top 10
Did not play

CUT = missed the half-way cut
WD = withdrew
"T" = tied for place

=== Summary ===
Tournament	Wins	2nd	3rd	Top-5	Top-10	Top-25	Events	Cuts made
Kraft Nabisco Championship	0	0	2	3	6	8	16	14
LPGA Championship	0	0	0	0	1	4	17	11
U.S. Women's Open	0	0	1	1	2	6	17	10
du Maurier Classic	2	0	0	2	2	6	8	7
Women's British Open	0	0	0	0	0	3	5	4
Totals	2	0	3	6	11	25	63	46

- Most consecutive cuts made – 14 (1991 LPGA – 1995 Nabisco)
- Longest streak of top-10s – 3 (1992 Nabisco – 1993 Nabisco)

== U.S. national team appearances ==
Amateur

- Curtis Cup: 1990 (winners)

Professional

- Solheim Cup: 1992, 1994 (winners), 1996 (winners), 1998 (winners), 2000
