= Melissa McNamara =

American professional golfer and coach (born 1966)

Personal information
- Full name: Melissa McNamara Luellen
- Nationality: United States
- Born: May 25, 1966 (age 60) Tulsa, Oklahoma, U.S.

Career
- Sport: Golf
- College: University of Tulsa
- Turned professional: 1988
- Former tours: LPGA Tour (1990–2000); Futures Tour (1988–1989); Ladies European Tour (1988–1989)
- Professional wins: 2

Number of wins by tour
- LPGA Tour: 1
- Other: 1

Best results in LPGA major championships
- Chevron Championship: T46: 1992
- Women's PGA C'ship: CUT: 1990, 1992–95, 1998
- U.S. Women's Open: T39: 1993
- du Maurier Classic: 22nd: 1996

Melissa McNamara Luellen (born May 25, 1966) is the head women's golf coach for Auburn University, and an American former professional golfer who played on the LPGA Tour.

== Career ==
McNamara was born in Tulsa, Oklahoma. She played college golf at the University of Tulsa where her mother, Dale, was the head coach, and was a member of the Chi Omega fraternity. She helped her team win the 1988 NCAA Women's Division I Championship and she won the individual title. These titles were later vacated by the NCAA due to rules violations by the track and field team.

McNamara turned professional in 1988 and played on the Futures Tour and Ladies European Tour in 1988 and 1989. She joined the LPGA Tour in 1990. She won once on the LPGA Tour in 1991.

After retiring from tournament golf, McNamara became head coach of the University of Tulsa's women's golf team, replacing her mother. She coached at Tulsa for two years and then became head coach at Arizona State University in 2002. She coached the team to the 2009 NCAA championship and Azahara Muñoz to the 2008 individual NCAA title. In 2015, Luellen became the head coach of the Auburn Tigers women's golf team.

== Professional wins ==
=== LPGA Tour wins (1) ===
No.	Date	Tournament	Winning score	Margin of victory	Runner-up
1	Aug 11, 1991	Stratton Mountain LPGA Classic	−8 (71-70-67-70=278)	2 strokes	(United States) Patty Sheehan

=== Other wins ===
- 1993 JCPenney Classic (with Mike Springer)
