= U.S. Women's Amateur Public Links =

The U.S. Women's Amateur Public Links Championship, often referred to as the Public Links or the Publinx, was a women's amateur golf tournament, one of 10 individual amateur championships organized by the USGA and first played in 1977. The USGA officially called the event the U.S. Women's Amateur Public Links, which it has registered as a service mark. The tournament was devised as a championship for female amateurs who play on public courses, as members of private clubs were barred from entry. In February 2013, the USGA announced that both this event and its men's counterpart, the U.S. Amateur Public Links, would be discontinued after their 2014 editions, and would be replaced by new amateur four-ball championships for both men and women.

While the U.S. Amateur Public Links was first held in 1922, the women's counterpart event was not held until 55 years later. Both the men's and women's Publinx had been created to provide outlets for national competition for public-course golfers, who before 1979 had been barred from entering either the U.S. Amateur or U.S. Women's Amateur because both events were restricted to members of clubs affiliated with the USGA or (presumably) other national governing bodies. When the USGA announced the demise of the men's and women's Publinx, it specifically stated that "the APL [Amateur Public Links] and WAPL [Women's Amateur Public Links] championships no longer serve their original mission because of the widespread accessibility public-course golfers today enjoy in USGA championships."

The main tournament opened with two rounds of stroke play. The leading 64 players then qualified to compete in a match play competition. The matches were played over 18 holes. Before 2002, the final was also played over 18 holes. From 2002 to 2014, the final was played over 36 holes.

Eligibility is similar to that for the U.S. Women's Amateur. Golfers must follow the USGA's guidelines for amateur status. The USGA defines an "amateur golfer" as anyone who plays golf purely for the qualities of the game itself, "not as a profession and not for financial gain". The Public Links, like the U.S. Women's Amateur, had no age restrictions. However, there were two key differences in the eligibility criteria for the Public Links:

- Entries were accepted from golfers with a USGA handicap index of 18.4 or lower, as opposed to 5.4 for the U.S. Women's Amateur.
- Entries were not accepted from players who had playing privileges at golf clubs not open to the general public, and such golfers were not allowed to compete if they received such privileges between their entry and the end of the main tournament.
  - Exceptions to above: The USGA did consider some players with privileges at non-public facilities to be "bona fide public course players," specifically those whose privileges were solely due to any of the following:
    - Their enrollment in a specific educational institution.
    - Their status as active or retired members of the military.
    - Their current or former employment by an entity other than a golf club.

Michelle Wie became the youngest champion in the history of USGA adult championships when she won the 2003 U.S. Women's Public Links championship at age 13, her final tournament victory as an amateur. Wie also holds the record as the youngest Publinx competitor; she played in 2000 as a 10-year-old.

== Winners ==
Year	Venue	Winner	Score	Runner-up
2014	The Home Course	(China) Fumie "Alice" Jo	3 & 2	(South Korea) Seong Eun-jeong
2013	Jimmie Austin OU Golf Club	(United States) Lauren Diaz-Yi	10 & 9	(United States) Doris Chen
2012	Neshanic Valley Golf Course	(United States) Kyung Kim	4 & 2	(United States) Ashlan Ramsey
2011	Bandon Dunes Golf Resort	(United States) (Vietnam) Brianna Do	1 up	(United States) Marissa Dodd
2010	Notre Dame's Warren Golf Course	(United States) Emily Tubert	3 & 2	(United States) Lisa McCloskey
2009	Red Tail Golf Club	(United States) (South Korea) Jennifer Song	7 & 6	(United States) Kimberly Kim
2008	Erin Hills	(United States) Tiffany Joh	2 & 1	(United States) (South Korea) Jennifer Song
2007	Kearney Hill Golf Links	(United States) Mina Harigae	4 & 3	(United States) Stephany Fleet
2006	Walking Stick G.C.	(United States) Tiffany Joh	6 & 5	(United States) Kimberly Kim
2005	Swope Memorial Golf Course	(South Korea) Eunjung Yi	37 holes	(United States) Tiffany Chudy
2004	Golden Horseshoe G.C. (Green Course)	(Taiwan) Yani Tseng	1 up	(United States) Michelle Wie
2003	Ocean Hammock G.C.	(United States) Michelle Wie	1 up	(Thailand) Virada Nirapathpongporn
2002	Sunriver Resort (Meadow Course)	(United States) Annie Thurman	6 & 5	(United States) Hwanhee Lee
2001	Kemper Lakes Golf Club	(Taiwan) Candie Kung	2 up	(United States) Missy Farr-Kaye
2000	Legacy Golf Links	(United States) Catherine Cartwright	3 & 1	(Thailand) Russamee Gulyanamitta
1999	Santa Ana Golf Club	(United States) Jody Niemann	1 up	(United States) Sue Billek Nyhus
1998	Kapalua Resort (Bay Course)	(United States) Amy Spooner	2 & 1	(United States) Natalie Wong
1997	Center Square (Pa.) G.C.	(United States) Jo Jo Robertson	3 & 2	(United States) Angie Yoon
1996	Spencer T. Olin Community G.C.	(United States) Heather Graff	5 & 4	(United States) Lauri Berles
1995	Hominy Hill G.C.	(United States) Jo Jo Robertson	3 & 1	(United States) Elizabeth Drambour
1994	Tam O'Shanter G.C.	(United States) Jill McGill	6 & 4	(United States) Heidi Voorhees
1993	Jackson Hole Golf & Tennis Club	(United States) Connie Masterson	1 up	(United States) Holly Reynolds
1992	Haggin Oaks G.C.	(United States) Amy Fruhwirth	3 & 1	(United States) Sara Evens
1991	Birdwood G.C.	(United States) Tracy Hanson	1 up	(United States) Carri Wood
1990	Hyland Hills G.C.	(United States) Cathy Mockett	5 & 4	(United States) Barbara Blanchar
1989	Indian Canyon G.C.	(United States) Pearl Sinn	2 & 1	(United States) Kelli Akers
1988	Page Belcher G.C.	(United States) Pearl Sinn	2 & 1	(United States) Tami Jo Hemingsen
1987	Cog Hill Golf & Country Club (No. 4 Course)	(United States) Tracy Kerdyk	4 & 3	(United States) Pearl Sinn
1986	Sentry World G.C.	(United States) Cindy Schreyer	3 & 2	(United States) Vicki Goetze
1985	Flanders Valley G.C. (Red and Blue nines)	(United States) Danielle Ammaccapane	6 & 5	(United States) Kristie Kolacny
1984	Meadowbrook G.C.	(United States) Heather Farr	3 & 2	(United States) Kristie Kolacny
1983	Ala Wai G.C.	(United States) Kelli Antolock	2 & 1	(United States) Nancy Taylor
1982	Alvamar G.C.	(United States) Nancy Taylor	2 & 1	(United States) Kerri Clark
1981	Emerald Valley Golf Club	(United States) Mary Enright	3 & 1	(United States) Lauri Merten
1980	Center Square G.C.	(United States) Lori Castillo	2 & 1	(United States) Pam Miller
1979	Braemar Golf Course	(United States) Lori Castillo	2 up	(United States) Becky Pearson
1978	Myrtlewood G.C. (Palmetto Course)	(United States) Kelly Fuiks	5 & 4	(United States) Diana Schwab
1977	Yahara Hills G.C.	(United States) Kelly Fuiks	1 up	(United States) Kathy Williams

== Multiple winners ==
- 2 wins: Kelly Fuiks, Lori Castillo, Pearl Sinn, Jo Jo Robertson, Tiffany Joh

Four players have won both the U.S. Women's Amateur Public Links and U.S. Women's Amateur Championships:

- Pearl Sinn: Publinx – 1988, 1989; Amateur – 1988
- Amy Fruhwirth: Publinx – 1992; Amateur – 1991
- Jill McGill: Publinx – 1994; Amateur – 1993
- Jennifer Song: Publinx – 2009; Amateur – 2009
