= Lori Castillo =

American professional golfer

Personal information
- Nationality: United States
- Born: 1961 (age 64–65)

Career
- Sport: Golf
- College: University of Tulsa; Stanford University
- Turned professional: 1983
- Former tour: Ladies European Tour (joined 1984)
- Professional wins: 7

Number of wins by tour
- Ladies European Tour: 1
- Other: 6

Achievements and awards
- Hawaii Golf Hall of Fame: 2008

Lori Castillo (born 1961) is an American professional golfer from Hawaii. She is one of only three golfers to have won both U.S. Girls' Junior (1978) and U.S. Women's Amateur Public Links (1979 and 1980), and was the first female to hold two USGA titles at the same time, joining only Chick Evans, Bobby Jones and Jack Nicklaus. She won the 1984 Wirral Caldy Classic on the Ladies European Tour and won the Hawaii State Open a record five times. She competed as Lori Planos during her marriage to Gary Planos of Kapalua Resort.

== Early life ==
Raised in a golfing family in Hawaii, Castillo's father, Ron, a Hawaii Golf Hall of Fame inductee, was a golf pro at the Hawaii Kai Golf Course, served as head coach of the Rainbow Wahine golf program 1976–81, and was director of the Aloha Section PGA 1992–96. Her four brothers all play golf professionally, Joey is a Hawaii State Junior champion, Michael was president of the Aloha Section PGA, Ron Jr. was the 1998 Aloha Section Match Play champion, and Rick head pro at the Wailea Golf Club on Maui.

== Amateur career ==
As an amateur, Castillo was one of the most decorated women's golfers in the state of Hawaii, winning three United States Golf Association (USGA) titles, the U.S. Girls' Junior Championship in 1978 and the U.S. Women's Amateur Public Links in both 1979 and 1980. In 1979 Castillo defeated Becky Pearson 2 up, then edged Pam Miller 2 & 1 a year later. She is the youngest to hold two USGA titles simultaneously and only Hawaii golfer to win three USGA national championships, and one of only four golfers ever to hold two USGA titles simultaneously. She also won the Junior World title for the 13-14 year-old division in 1974.

After graduating from Kaiser High School in Hawaii Kai, Castillo attended the University of Tulsa, where she was a member of the team that won the 1980 AIAW National Championship title. After two years she transferred to Stanford University, where she received a bachelor's degree in communication in 1983 and earned honorable mention All-American honors.

Castillo scored 2-1-0 as a member of the 1980 Curtis Cup team that won at St Pierre Golf & Country Club in Chepstow, Wales.

She won the Hawaii State Open Women's Golf Tournament in 1977 and 1983, then three times consecutively in 1993, 1994 and 1995, giving her a record five state titles. She is also two-time winner of the Hawaii State Women's Match Play Championship (1979, 1980) and the 1981 Hawaii State Women's Stroke Play champion. In her final amateur appearance she won Jennie K. Wilson Invitational by 17 shots, shooting a record 66 in opening round and breaking tournament record.

== Professional career ==
Castillo turned professional in 1983. After failing to obtain her 1984 LPGA Tour card at Q-School, she went to Europe, where she and five other American players were sponsored by a Swiss watch company. She competed three seasons on the Ladies European Tour (LET), 1984, 1985 and 1988. She won one title, the 1984 Wirral Caldy Classic. Castillo also played one season on the Ladies Asian Golf Tour. She was third at the 1988 Letting French Open but injuries soon ended her career, and she returned to Hawaii full-time.

== Coaching career ==
Following her professional career, Castillo served as a tournament coordinator for PGA Senior Tour events, teaching professional at Kapalua Golf Academy, served as an LPGA Teaching and Club Professional Member Advisor, and on the board of directors for the Hawaii State Junior Golf Association, as well as a committee member for the USGA. In 2008, Castillo became the coach of the Rainbow Wahine women's golf team at the University of Hawaii.

In 2008, Castillo became the 12th woman inducted into Hawaii Golf Hall of Fame.

== Amateur wins ==
- 1974 Junior World Golf Championships (Girls 13-14)
- 1978 U.S. Girls' Junior
- 1979 Hawaii State Women's Match Play Championship
- 1979 U.S. Women's Amateur Public Links
- 1980 U.S. Women's Amateur Public Links
- 1980 Hawaii State Women's Match Play Championship
- 1980 AIAW National Championship
- 1981 Hawaii State Women's Stroke Play Championship
- 1983 Jennie K. Wilson Invitational

== Professional wins ==
=== Ladies European Tour wins (1) ===
- 1984 Wirral Caldy Classic

=== Other wins (6) ===
- 1977 Hawaii State Women's Open
- 1983 Hawaii State Women's Open
- 1993 Hawaii State Women's Open
- 1994 Hawaii State Women's Open
- 1995 Hawaii State Women's Open
- 1996 LPGA Big Skins Game in Ka‘anapali, Maui

== Team appearances ==
Amateur

- Curtis Cup (representing the United States): 1980 (winners)
