= Amy Fruhwirth =

American professional golfer (born 1968)

Personal information
- Nationality: United States
- Born: July 23, 1968 (age 58) Cypress, California, U.S.
- Height: 5 ft 2 in (1.57 m)

Career
- Sport: Golf
- College: Arizona State University
- Status: Professional
- Former tour: LPGA Tour (1993-2004)
- Professional wins: 2

Number of wins by tour
- LPGA Tour: 1
- Other: 1

Best results in LPGA major championships
- Chevron Championship: T3: 1997
- Women's PGA C'ship: T12: 2000
- U.S. Women's Open: T28: 1995
- du Maurier Classic: T10: 1996
- Women's British Open: CUT: 2003

Amy Fruhwirth (born July 23, 1968) is an American professional golfer who played on the LPGA Tour.

== Early life and amateur career ==
In 1968, Fruhwirth was born in Cypress, California. In 1985, she also finished runner-up in the U.S. Girl's Junior.

In the late 1980s, she entered Arizona State University. She played on the golf team and was a three-time All-American. In her amateur career, she also won the 1991 California Women's Amateur, 1991 U.S. Women's Amateur, and 1992 U.S. Women's Amateur Public Links. She played on the U.S. Curtis Cup team in 1992.

== Professional career ==
In the early 1990s, Fruhwirth turned professional. She played on the LPGA Tour from 1993 to 2004, winning once in 1998.

== Awards and honors ==
In 2005, Fruhwirth was inducted into the Sun Devil Women's Golf Hall of Fame.

== Amateur wins ==
- 1986 AJGA Tournament of Champions
- 1991 California Women's Amateur Championship, U.S. Women's Amateur
- 1992 U.S. Women's Amateur Public Links

== Professional wins (2) ==
=== LPGA Tour wins (1) ===
No.	Date	Tournament	Winning score	Margin of Victory	Runner(s)-up
1	Jul 21, 1998	Friendly's Classic	-8 (69-71-68-72=280)	2 strokes	(United States) Kim Saiki (Sweden) Charlotta Sörenstam

=== Other wins (1) ===
- 1997 JCPenney Classic (with Clarence Rose)

== Team appearances ==
Amateur

- Curtis Cup (representing the United States): 1992
