= Yi Eun-jung =

South Korean professional golfer (born 1988)

Personal information
- Nationality: South Korea
- Born: 11 January 1988 (age 38) Uijeongbu, South Korea
- Height: 1.60 m (5 ft 3 in)

Career
- Sport: Golf
- Turned professional: 2006
- Former tours: LPGA Tour; Futures Tour
- Professional wins: 1

Number of wins by tour
- LPGA Tour: 1

Best results in LPGA major championships
- Chevron Championship: T69: 2010
- Women's PGA C'ship: T53: 2009
- U.S. Women's Open: CUT: 2009, 2010
- Women's British Open: T57: 2009
- Evian Championship: DNP

- Yi Eun-jung
- Hangul: 이은정
- RR: I Eunjeong
- MR: I Ŭnjŏng

Yi Eun-jung (Korean: 이은정, born 11 January 1988) is a South Korean professional golfer. She played on the LPGA Tour.

== Career ==
Yi was born in Uijeongbu, South Korea. She turned professional in 2006 and joined the Duramed Futures Tour. She qualified for the LPGA Tour via the Qualifying Tournament at the end of 2007. Her first LPGA Tour victory came at the 2009 Jamie Farr Owens Corning Classic.

== Amateur wins ==
- 2005 U.S. Women's Amateur Public Links

== Professional wins (1) ==
=== LPGA Tour wins (1) ===
No.	Date	Tournament	Winning score	Margin of victory	Runner-up
1	5 Jul 2009	Jamie Farr Owens Corning Classic	–18 (68-66-61-71=266)	Playoff	(United States) Morgan Pressel

LPGA Tour playoff record (1–0)

No.	Year	Tournament	Opponent	Result
1	2009	Jamie Farr Owens Corning Classic	(United States) Morgan Pressel	Won with birdie on first extra hole

== Results in LPGA majors ==
Results not in chronological order before 2014.

Tournament	2008	2009	2010	2011	2012	2013	2014
Kraft Nabisco Championship			T69	75	CUT	WD	CUT
U.S. Women's Open		CUT	CUT				
Women's British Open		T57	T67				
LPGA Championship	CUT	T53	CUT		CUT	CUT	
The Evian Championship ^							

^ The Evian Championship was added as a major in 2013.

Did not play

CUT = missed the half-way cut
WD = withdrew
T = tied
