= Pearl Sinn =

South Korean professional golfer (born 1967)

Pearl Sinn-Bonanni
Personal information
- Full name: Ji Young "Pearl" Sinn-Bonanni
- Nationality: United States
- Born: July 17, 1967 (age 59) Seoul, South Korea
- Height: 5 ft 3 in (1.60 m)

Career
- Sport: Golf
- College: Arizona State University
- Turned professional: 1989
- Former tours: Futures Tour (1989–1990); Ladies European Tour (1990); LPGA Tour (1991–2005)
- Professional wins: 2

Number of wins by tour
- LPGA Tour: 1
- LPGA of Korea Tour: 1

Best results in LPGA major championships
- Chevron Championship: T35: 1996
- Women's PGA C'ship: T26: 1999
- U.S. Women's Open: T33: 1997
- du Maurier Classic: T40: 1999
- Women's British Open: T15: 2001

Achievements and awards
- Ladies European Tour Rookie of the Year: 1990

Ji Young "Pearl" Sinn-Bonanni (born July 17, 1967) is a Korean-American professional golfer who played on the LPGA Tour. She played under her maiden name, Pearl Sinn until her marriage in 2002.

== Early life ==
Sinn was born in Seoul, South Korea. Her family moved to the United States when she was 9 and she became a U.S. citizen at age 14, renouncing her Korean citizenship.

== Amateur career ==
Sinn had a very successful amateur career. She played college golf at Arizona State University where she was a three-time All-American.

In addition, she won the U.S. Women's Amateur Public Links in 1988 and 1989 (after finishing runner-up in 1987) and the U.S. Women's Amateur in 1988. Sinn also played on the winning U.S. teams in the 1988 Curtis Cup and 1988 Espirito Santo Trophy. Under USGA rules, the 1988 Women's Amateur win makes her eligible for the U.S. Senior Women's Open in 2018.

== Professional career ==
In 1989, Sinn turned professional. She played on the Futures Tour and Ladies European Tour where she was Rookie of the Year in 1990.

Sinn played on the LPGA Tour from 1991 to 2005, winning once in 1998.

Sinn-Bonanni is currently head coach of the women's golf team at Cal State Fullerton.

== Awards and honors ==
In 1990, she won the Ladies European Tour's Rookie of the Year award.

== Amateur wins ==
- 1988 U.S. Women's Amateur Public Links, U.S. Women's Amateur
- 1989 U.S. Women's Amateur Public Links

== Professional wins (2) ==
=== LPGA Tour wins (1) ===
No.	Date	Tournament	Winning score	Margin of victory	Runner-up
1	Aug 30, 1998	State Farm Rail Classic	–16 (69-66-65=200)	1 stroke	(United States) Michele Redman

=== KLPGA wins (1) ===
- 1999 BUY KOREA Ladies Open

== U.S. national team appearances ==
Amateur

- Curtis Cup: 1988
- Espirito Santo Trophy: 1988 (winners)
