= 1993 du Maurier Classic =

Coordinates: 42.978781°N 81.340914°W

The 1993 du Maurier Classic was contested from August 26–29 at London Hunt Club. It was the 21st edition of the du Maurier Classic, and the 15th edition as a major championship on the LPGA Tour.

This event was won by Brandie Burton in a sudden-death playoff with Betsy King with a birdie on the first extra playoff hole.

== Final leaderboard ==
Place	Player	Score	To par	Money (US$)
1	(United States) Brandie Burton	71-70-66-70=277	−11	120,000
2	(United States) Betsy King	65-70-71-71=277	−11	74,474
3	(Canada) Dawn Coe-Jones	64-74-72-68=278	−10	54,346
4	(United States) Dottie Pepper	68-69-71-71=279	−9	42,269
T5	(United States) Vicki Fergon	67-73-68-72=280	−8	31,198
T5	(United States) Kris Monaghan	72-71-71-66=280	−8	31,198
7	(United States) Dana Dormann	68-68-73-72=281	−7	23,751
T8	(Sweden) Helen Alfredsson	70-70-72-70=282	−6	19,926
T8	(United States) Kathy Guadagnino	69-69-70-74=282	−6	19,926
T10	(United States) Danielle Ammaccapane	72-72-73-66=283	−5	14,894
T10	(United States) Judy Dickinson	70-71-71-71=283	−5	14,894
T10	(United States) Christa Johnson	71-69-72-71=283	−5	14,894
T10	(United States) Sherri Steinhauer	73-69-71-70=283	−5	14,894
