= Beth Daniel =

American professional golfer (born 1956)

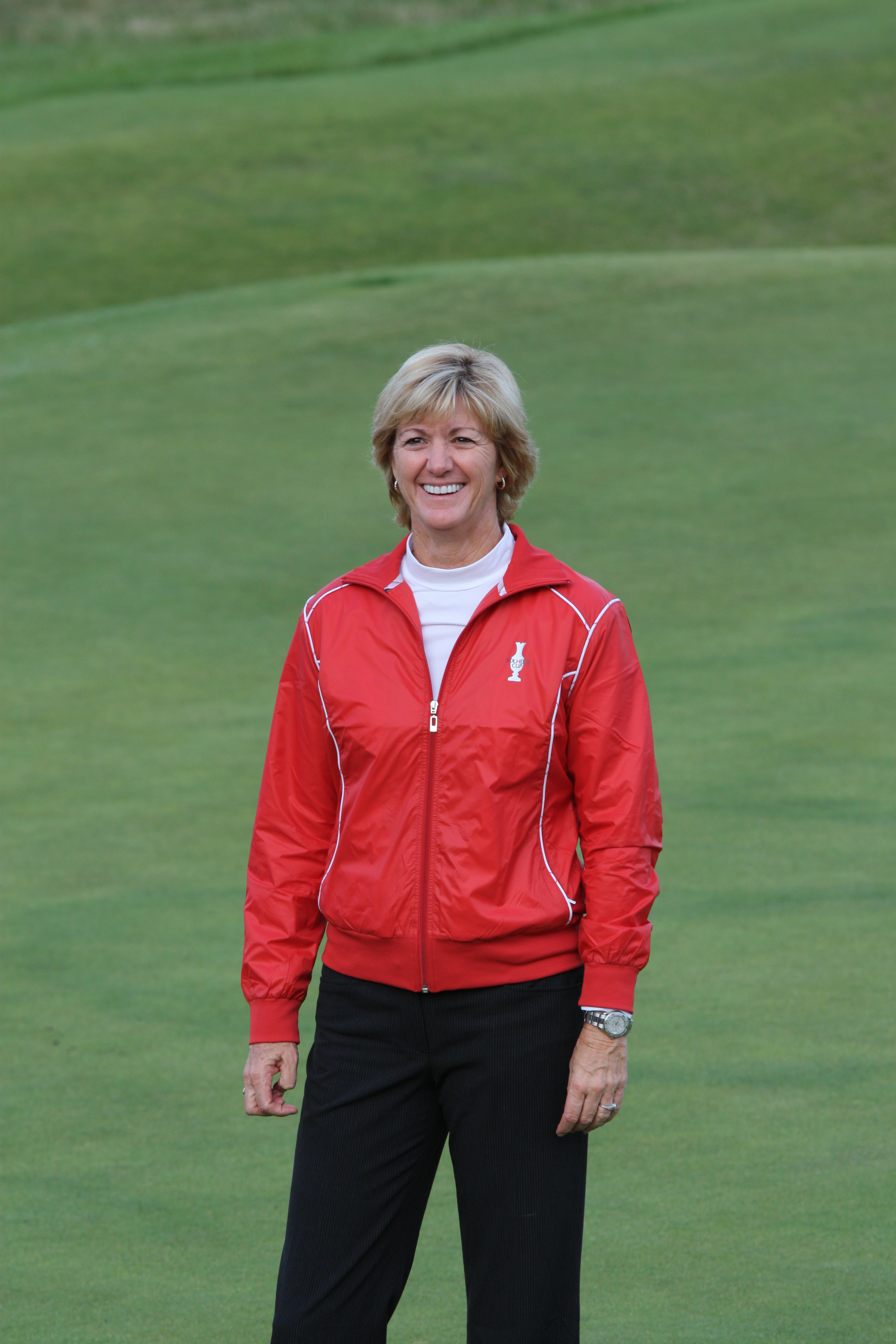
- Daniel in 2009

Personal information
- Nationality: United States
- Born: October 14, 1956 (age 70) Charleston, South Carolina, U.S.
- Height: 5 ft 11 in (1.80 m)
- Life partner: Meg Mallon

Career
- Sport: Golf
- College: Furman University
- Turned professional: 1978
- Former tour: LPGA Tour (joined 1979)
- Professional wins: 41

Number of wins by tour
- LPGA Tour: 33
- LPGA of Japan Tour: 4
- Other: 4

Best results in LPGA major championships (wins: 1)
- Chevron Championship: T2: 1983
- Women's PGA C'ship: Won: 1990
- U.S. Women's Open: 2nd/T2: 1981, 1982
- du Maurier Classic: 2nd: 1982
- Women's British Open: T5: 2004

Achievements and awards
- World Golf Hall of Fame: 2000 (member page)
- LPGA Tour Rookie of the Year: 1979
- LPGA Tour Money Winner: 1980, 1981, 1990
- LPGA Tour Player of the Year: 1980, 1990, 1994
- LPGA Vare Trophy: 1989, 1990, 1994
- GWAA Female Player of the Year: 1980, 1990
- Associated Press Female Athlete of the Year: 1990
- LPGA Heather Farr Award: 2003
- Broderick Award: 1977

Beth Daniel (born October 14, 1956) is an American professional golfer. She became a member of the LPGA Tour in 1979 and won 33 LPGA Tour events, including one major championship, during her career. She is a member of the World Golf Hall of Fame.

== Early life and amateur career ==
Daniel was born on October 14, 1956, in Charleston, South Carolina. She played her college golf at Furman University, and was on the 1976 national championship team that included future LPGA players Betsy King, Sherri Turner and Cindy Ferro. In 1977, she won the Broderick Award (now the Honda Sports Award) as the nation's best female collegiate golfer.

Daniel won the U.S. Women's Amateur in 1975 and 1977, the 1978 Women's Western Amateur, and was on the U.S. Curtis Cup teams in 1976 and 1978 (going 4–0 in 1976).

== Professional career ==
She turned pro at the end of 1978 and joined the LPGA Tour in 1979. Daniel's first victory came in 1979 year at the Patty Berg Classic, and she went on to win the LPGA Rookie of the Year award. Over the next five years, when Nancy Lopez was at her most dominant, she still managed to win 13 tournaments, including four in 1980 when she was named LPGA Tour Player of the Year. Daniel led the Tour in wins in 1982, 1990 and 1994. She also led in scoring three times, including in 1989 when she became the second golfer in Tour history to record a scoring average below 71.00.

The year 1990 was Daniel's most successful on tour. She won seven times, including her lone major at the Mazda LPGA Championship. That year she was also named the Associated Press Female Athlete of the Year. Along the way, she endured two major slumps. She was winless from 1986 to 1988 and again from 1996 to 2002. When she finally won again in 2003, she became - at age 46 years, 8 months and 29 days - the oldest winner in Tour history. She had outlasted most of her contemporaries such as King, Patty Sheehan and Amy Alcott, remaining competitive on the LPGA Tour.

Daniel won the Golf Writers Association of America Female Player of the Year in 1980 and 1990. She also won the 1981 Seagrams Seven Crowns of Sport Award for women's golf. She was inducted into the South Carolina Golf Hall of Fame in September 1995. She was recognized during the LPGA's 50th Anniversary in 2000 as one of the LPGA's top-50 players and teachers.

Daniel played on eight U.S. Solheim Cup teams: in 1990, 1992, 1994, 1996, 2000, 2002, 2003, and 2005.

By 2005 Daniel had cut back her schedule, and played just five events by 2007. That year she also served as assistant captain on the U.S. Solheim Cup team, and was named captain for the American squad in 2009. In 2007, she joined the Golf Channel as a substitute analyst for LPGA Tournament coverage. Her first event was the 2007 Safeway Classic.

Daniel also awards the best junior female golfer in South Carolina with the Beth Daniel Award. The award is given to the player with the most SCJGA (South Carolina Junior Golf Association) points in a year.

In 2009, Daniel was the captain of the U.S. Solheim Cup team that defeated Europe by a score of 16–12 at Rich Harvest Farms in Sugar Grove, Illinois.

== Personal life ==
Beth Daniel is in a long-term relationship with fellow golfer Meg Mallon. In, 2017 Mallon revealed that she and Daniel, have been in a relationship for nearly 25 years.

== Awards and honors ==
- In 1977, she won the Broderick Award as the nation's best female collegiate golfer.
- In 1979, Daniel earned the LPGA Rookie of the Year award.
- In 1980 and 1990, Daniel won the Golf Writers Association of America Female Player of the Year.
- Daniel won the LPGA's money list three times: in 1980, 1981, and 1990.

== Professional wins (41) ==
=== LPGA Tour wins (33) ===
Legend
LPGA Tour major championships (1)
Other LPGA Tour (32)

| No. | Date | Tournament | Winning score | Margin of victory | Runner(s)-up |
|---|---|---|---|---|---|
| 1 | Aug 26, 1979 | Patty Berg Classic | −11 (68-69-71=208) | 4 strokes | (United States) Hollis Stacy |
| 2 | Jun 1, 1980 | Golden Lights Championship | −1 (72-74-70-71=287) | 2 strokes | (United States) Nancy Lopez (United States) Jo Ann Washam |
| 3 | Aug 17, 1980 | Patty Berg Golf Classic | −9 (60-70-72=210) | 2 strokes | (United States) Hollis Stacy |
| 4 | Aug 24, 1980 | Columbia Savings LPGA Classic | −12 (71-66-67-72=276) | 6 strokes | (United States) Jane Blalock (Canada) Sandra Post |
| 5 | Sep 7, 1980 | World Series of Women's Golf | −6 (71-72-68-71=282) | 1 stroke | (United States) Nancy Lopez |
| 6 | Apr 19, 1981 | Florida Lady Citrus | −7 (68-67-74-72-281) | Playoff | (United States) Donna Caponi (United States) Cindy Hill (United States) Patti Rizzo (United States) Patty Sheehan |
| 7 | Aug 23, 1981 | World Championship of Women's Golf | −4 (72-72-69-71=284) | 1 stroke | (Australia) Jan Stephenson |
| 8 | Feb 21, 1982 | Bent Tree Ladies Classic | −12 (71-71-66-68=276) | 4 strokes | (United States) Amy Alcott |
| 9 | Mar 7, 1982 | American Express Sun City Classic | −10 (70-67-71-70=278) | Playoff | (United States) Carole Jo Kabler |
| 10 | May 2, 1982 | Birmingham Classic | −13 (64-70-69=203) | 4 strokes | (United States) Patty Sheehan |
| 11 | Aug 1, 1982 | Columbia Savings Classic | −12 (72-68-72-64=276) | 2 strokes | (United States) Patty Sheehan |
| 12 | Aug 15, 1982 | WUI Classic | −12 (68-68-67-73=276) | 8 strokes | (United States) Martha Nause (Japan) Ayako Okamoto |
| 13 | Jul 17, 1983 | McDonald's Kids Classic | −2 (67-71-73-75=286) | Playoff | (United States) JoAnne Carner |
| 14 | Apr 14, 1985 | Kyocera Inamori Classic | −2 (70-70-74-72=286) | 2 strokes | (United States) Pat Meyers |
| 15 | Aug 6, 1989 | Greater Washington Open | −8 (66-68-71=205) | 4 strokes | (United States) Sherri Turner |
| 16 | Sep 4, 1989 | Rail Charity Golf Classic | −13 (69-70-64=203) | 3 strokes | (United States) Betsy King (United States) Alice Ritzman |
| 17 | Sep 17, 1989 | Safeco Classic | −15 (69-69-65-70=273 | 6 strokes | (United States) Cindy Rarick |
| 18 | Oct 1, 1989 | Konica San Jose Classic | −11 (65-67-73=205) | 1 stroke | (United States) Pat Bradley |
| 19 | Feb 24, 1990 | Orix Hawaiian Ladies Open | −6 (71-67-72=210) | 3 strokes | (United States) Amy Benz (United States) Patty Sheehan |
| 20 | Mar 4, 1990 | Women's Kemper Open | −1 (73-75-66-69=283) | 1 stroke | (England) Laura Davies (United States) Rosie Jones |
| 21 | Jul 23, 1990 | The Phar-Mor in Youngstown | −9 (65-69-73=207) | Playoff | (United States) Patty Sheehan |
| 22 | Jul 29 1990 | Mazda LPGA Championship | −4 (71-73-70-66=280) | 1 stroke | (United States) Rosie Jones |
| 23 | Aug 26, 1990 | Northgate Classic | −13 (66-69-68=203) | 6 strokes | (United States) Penny Hammel (United States) Christa Johnson |
| 24 | Sep 3, 1990 | Rail Charity Golf Classic | −13 (67-69-67=203) | 3 strokes | (United States) Susan Sanders |
| 25 | Oct 7, 1990 | Centel Classic | −17 (71-63-68-69=271) | 1 stroke | (United States) Nancy Lopez |
| 26 | Feb 10, 1991 | The Phar-Mor at Inverrary | −7 (67-73-69=209) | 2 strokes | (United States) Nancy Lopez |
| 27 | Jul 23, 1991 | McDonald's Championship | −11 (67-71-67-68=273) | 4 strokes | (United States) Pat Bradley (South Africa) Sally Little |
| 28 | May 29, 1994 | LPGA Corning Classic | −10 (67-71-71-69=278) | 1 stroke | (United States) Stephanie Farwig (United States) Nancy Ramsbottom |
| 29 | Jun 5, 1994 | Oldsmobile Classic | −20 (67-63-70-68-268) | 4 strokes | (United States) Lisa Kiggens |
| 30 | Jul 17, 1994 | JAL Big Apple Classic | −8 (70-69-66-71=276) | Playoff | (England) Laura Davies |
| 31 | Oct 16, 1994 | World Championship of Women's Golf | −14 (68-70-71-65=274) | 3 strokes | (United States) Elaine Crosby |
| 32 | Aug 13, 1995 | PING/Welch's Championship (Boston) | −17 (65-68-69-69=271) | 3 strokes | (United States) Meg Mallon (United States) Colleen Walker |
| 33 | Jul 15, 2003 | BMO Financial Group Canadian Women's Open | −13 (69-69-69-68=275) | 1 stroke | (United States) Juli Inkster |

LPGA Tour playoff record (5–6)

| No. | Year | Tournament | Opponent(s) | Result |
|---|---|---|---|---|
| 1 | 1981 | Florida Lady Citrus | (United States) Donna Caponi (United States) Cindy Hill (United States) Patti Rizzo (United States) Patty Sheehan | Won with birdie on second extra hole Hill, Rizzo, and Sheehan eliminated by par on first hole |
| 2 | 1982 | American Express Sun City Classic | (United States) Carole Jo Kabler | Won with birdie on second extra hole |
| 3 | 1983 | McDonald's Kids Classic | (United States) JoAnne Carner | Won with birdie on first extra hole |
| 4 | 1983 | Columbia Savings Classic | (United States) Pat Bradley | Lost to birdie on first extra hole |
| 5 | 1988 | Atlantic City LPGA Classic | (United States) Juli Inkster | Lost to par on first extra hole |
| 6 | 1989 | Oldsmobile LPGA Classic | (United States) Dottie Mochrie | Lost to par on fifth extra hole |
| 7 | 1990 | The Phar-Mor in Youngstown | (United States) Patty Sheehan | Won with birdie on first extra hole |
| 8 | 1991 | Northgate Computer Classic | (United States) Jody Anschutz (United States) Cindy Rarick | Rarick won with birdie on third extra hole Anschutz eliminated by par on first hole |
| 9 | 1992 | The Phar-Mor in Youngstown | (United States) Donna Andrews (United States) Betsy King (United States) Meg Mallon | King won with birdie on first extra hole |
| 10 | 1992 | Sun-Times Challenge | (United States) Judy Dickinson (United States) Dottie Pepper | Pepper won with par on sixth extra hole Daniel eliminated by par on fourth hole |
| 11 | 1994 | JAL Big Apple Classic | (England) Laura Davies | Won with birdie on first extra hole |

=== LPGA of Japan Tour wins (4) ===
- 1979 World Ladies
- 1988 Nichirei International
- 1990 Konica Cup World Ladies
- 1991 Konica Cup World Ladies

=== Other wins (4) ===
- 1981 JCPenney Mixed Team Classic (with Tom Kite)
- 1990 JCPenney Classic (with Davis Love III)
- 1995 JCPenney Classic (with Davis Love III)
- 1999 World Golf Hall of Fame Championship (with Johnny Miller)

== Major championships ==
=== Wins (1) ===
| Year | Championship | Winning score | Margin | Runner-up |
|---|---|---|---|---|
| 1990 | Mazda LPGA Championship | −4 (71-73-70-66=280) | 1 stroke | (United States) Rosie Jones |

=== Results timeline ===
| Tournament | 1976 | 1977 | 1978 | 1979 | 1980 |
|---|---|---|---|---|---|
| LPGA Championship | | | | T38 | T3 |
| U.S. Women's Open | CUT | T24 | T53 | T20 | T10 |
| du Maurier Classic | ... | ... | ... | T16 | 5 |

| Tournament | 1981 | 1982 | 1983 | 1984 | 1985 | 1986 | 1987 | 1988 | 1989 | 1990 |
|---|---|---|---|---|---|---|---|---|---|---|
| Kraft Nabisco Championship | ... | ... | T2 | 4 | T11 | T17 | T22 | | T6 | T6 |
| LPGA Championship | T5 | T7 | T16 | T2 | T10 | T15 | T58 | | T14 | 1 |
| U.S. Women's Open | 2 | T2 | WD | T10 | CUT | T21 | T33 | T10 | T20 | T6 |
| du Maurier Classic | T17 | 2 | T63 | T6 | T14 | 27 | CUT | T47 | T7 | 3 |

| Tournament | 1991 | 1992 | 1993 | 1994 | 1995 | 1996 | 1997 | 1998 | 1999 | 2000 |
|---|---|---|---|---|---|---|---|---|---|---|
| Kraft Nabisco Championship | T30 | T8 | T69 | T19 | T47 | | CUT | 72 | T43 | T47 |
| LPGA Championship | 4 | T35 | T17 | T7 | T18 | T26 | | T58 | CUT | T33 |
| U.S. Women's Open | T11 | CUT | T53 | T18 | CUT | T19 | | T31 | T47 | 8 |
| du Maurier Classic | | WD | T17 | CUT | T45 | T36 | | T54 | T13 | T23 |

| Tournament | 2001 | 2002 | 2003 | 2004 | 2005 | 2006 | 2007 |
|---|---|---|---|---|---|---|---|
| Kraft Nabisco Championship | T55 | T14 | T5 | T40 | T9 | T13 | |
| LPGA Championship | T26 | 2 | T3 | T39 | T54 | T39 | CUT |
| U.S. Women's Open | T24 | T7 | T20 | T27 | CUT | | |
| Women's British Open ^ | CUT | T16 | T14 | T5 | T56 | T6 | T50 |

^ The Women's British Open replaced the du Maurier Classic as an LPGA major in 2001.

Win
Top 10
Did not play

CUT = missed the half-way cut.
WD = withdrew
T = tied

=== Summary ===
| Tournament | Wins | 2nd | 3rd | Top-5 | Top-10 | Top-25 | Events | Cuts made |
|---|---|---|---|---|---|---|---|---|
| Kraft Nabisco Championship | 0 | 1 | 0 | 3 | 7 | 13 | 22 | 21 |
| LPGA Championship | 1 | 2 | 2 | 7 | 10 | 15 | 27 | 25 |
| U.S. Women's Open | 0 | 2 | 0 | 2 | 8 | 17 | 29 | 23 |
| du Maurier Classic | 0 | 1 | 1 | 3 | 5 | 11 | 20 | 17 |
| Women's British Open | 0 | 0 | 0 | 1 | 2 | 4 | 7 | 6 |
| Totals | 1 | 6 | 3 | 16 | 32 | 60 | 105 | 92 |

- Most consecutive cuts made – 17 (1977 U.S. Open – 1983 Peter Jackson Classic)
- Longest streak of top-10s – 5 (1981 U.S. Open – 1983 Nabisco Dinah Shore)

== U.S. national team appearances ==
Amateur

- Curtis Cup: 1976 (winners), 1978 (winners)
- Espirito Santo Trophy: 1978

Professional

- Solheim Cup: 1990 (winners), 1992, 1994 (winners), 1996 (winners), 2000, 2002 (winners), 2003, 2005 (winners), 2009 (non-playing captain, winners)
- World Cup: 2005
- Handa Cup: 2007 (winners), 2008 (winners), 2009 (winners), 2010 (winners), 2011 (winners), 2012 (tie, Cup retained), 2013, 2014 (winners), 2015 (winners)

== See also ==
- List of golfers with most LPGA Tour wins
- List of golfers with most LPGA major championship wins
