= U.S. Girls' Junior =

Amateur golf tournament

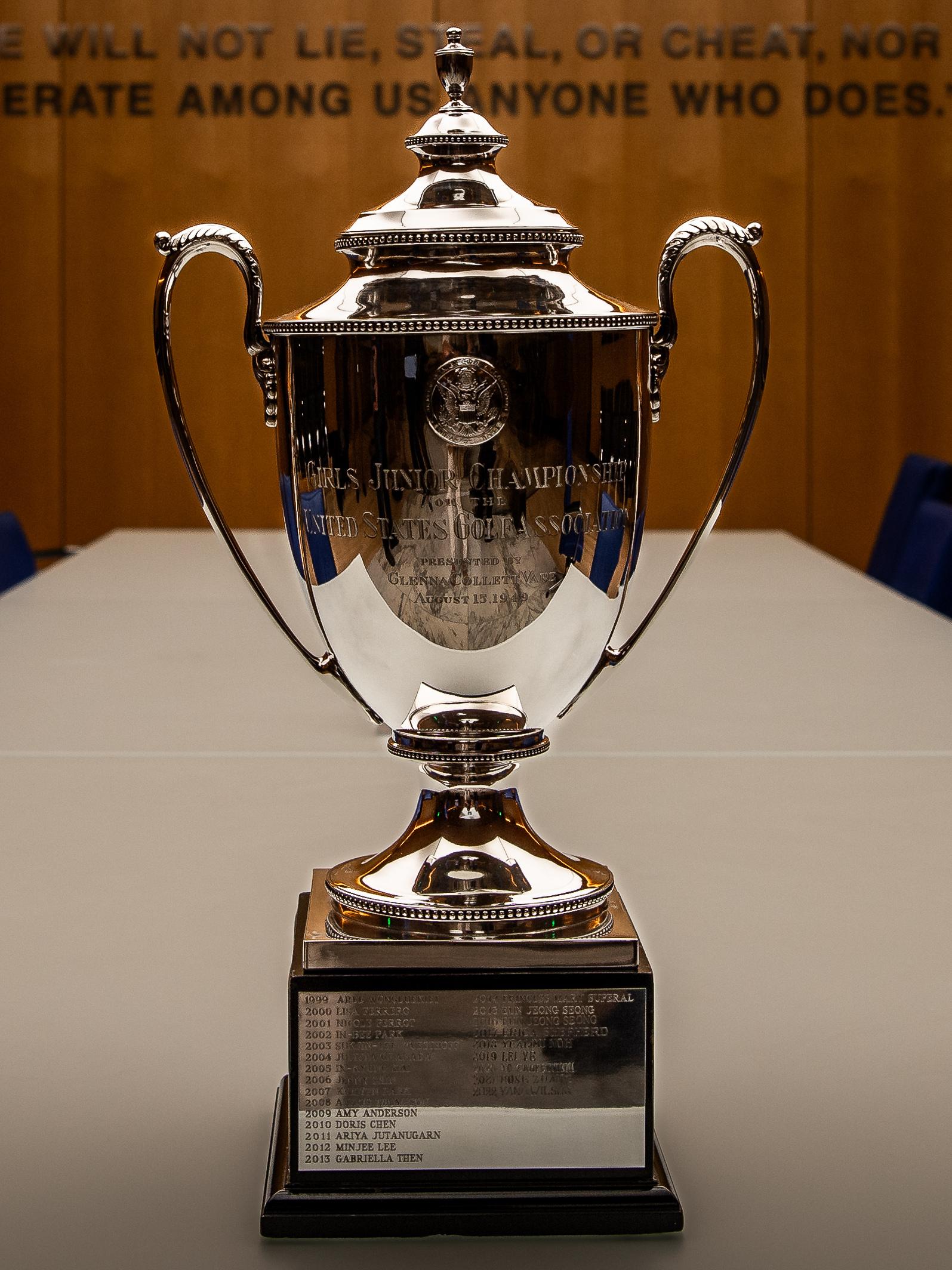
The Glenna Collett Vare Trophy on display in 2023

The U.S. Girls' Junior is one of the fifteen U.S. national golf championships organized by the United States Golf Association. It is open to amateur girls who are under 19 on the last day of the competition and have a USGA handicap index of 9.4 or less. It consists of two days of stroke play, with the leading 64 competitors then playing a match play competition to decide the champion.

The inaugural championship was held in 1949 and was won by Marlene Bauer from a field of 28 entries.

Aree Wongluekiet, now Aree Song, is the youngest winner at 13 years, 99 days in 1999. Hollis Stacy is the only three-time winner of the tournament.

== Winners ==
Year	Winner	Score	Runner-up	Venue
2026	(Canada) Clairey Lin	5 & 4	(United States) Amelie Zalsman	Old Chatham Golf Club (NC)
2025	(Canada) Aphrodite Deng	2 & 1	(Singapore) Xingtong Chen	Atlanta Athletic Club (Riverside Course) (GA)
2024	(Philippines) Rianne Malixi	8 & 7	(United States) Asterisk Talley	El Caballero Country Club (CA)
2023	(United States) Kiara Romero	1 up	(Philippines) Rianne Malixi	Eisenhower Golf Club (CO)
2022	(United States) Yana Wilson	3 & 2	(United States) Gianna Clemente	The Club at Olde Stone (KY)
2021	(United States) Rose Zhang	6 & 4	(United States) Bailey Davis	Columbia Country Club (MD)
2020	Canceled due to the COVID-19 pandemic			
2019	(China) Ye Lei	1 up	(United States) Jillian Bourdage	SentryWorld (WI)
2018	(United States) Yealimi Noh	4 & 3	(United States) Alexa Pano	Poppy Hills Golf Course (CA)
2017	(United States) Erica Shepherd	3 & 2	(United States) Jennifer Chang	Boone Valley Golf Club (MO)
2016	(South Korea) Seong Eun-jeong	3 & 2	(United States) Andrea Lee	Ridgewood Country Club (NJ)
2015	(South Korea) Seong Eun-jeong	3 & 2	(United States) Angel Yin	Tulsa Country Club (OK)
2014	(Philippines) Princess Mary Superal	37 holes	(Mexico) Marijosse Navarro	Forest Highlands Golf Club (Meadow Course) (AZ)
2013	(United States) Gabriella Then	2 & 1	(United States) Lakareber Abe	Sycamore Hills Golf Club (IN)
2012	(Australia) Minjee Lee	1 up	(United States) Alison Lee	Lake Merced Golf Club (CA)
2011	(Thailand) Ariya Jutanugarn	2 & 1	(Philippines) Dottie Ardina	Olympia Fields Country Club (South Course) (IL)
2010	(United States) (Taiwan) Doris Chen	3 & 2	(United States) Katelyn Dambaugh	The Country Club of North Carolina (Dogwood Course) (NC)
2009	(United States) Amy Anderson	6 & 5	(United States) Kimberly Kim	Trump National Golf Club (Old and New Courses) (NJ)
2008	(United States) Lexi Thompson	5 & 4	(United States) Karen Chung	Hartford Golf Club (CT)
2007	(United States) Kristen Park	4 & 3	(United States) Ayaka Kaneko	Tacoma Country & Golf Club (WA)
2006	(South Korea) Jenny Shin	37 holes	(United States) Vicky Hurst	Carmel Country Club (South Course) (NC)
2005	(South Korea) In-Kyung Kim	5 & 4	(South Korea) Inbee Park	BanBury Golf Club (ID)
2004	(Paraguay) Julieta Granada	20 holes	(United States) Jane Park	Mira VIsta Golf Club (TX)
2003	(South Korea) (United States) Sukjin-Lee Wuesthoff	1 up	(South Korea) Inbee Park	Brooklawn Country Club (CT)
2002	(South Korea) Inbee Park	4 & 3	(United States) Jennifer Tangtiphaiboontana	Echo Lake Country Club (NJ)
2001	(Chile) Nicole Perrot	3 & 2	(United States) Whitney Welch	Indian Hill Country Club (KS)
2000	(United States) Lisa Ferrero	3 & 1	(United States) Ina Kim	Pumpkin Ridge Golf Club (Ghost Creek Course) (OR)
1999	(Thailand) Aree Wongluekiet	2 up	(United States) Nancy Abiecunas	Green Spring Valley Hunt Club (MD)
1998	(United States) Leigh Anne Hardin	2 up	(United States) Brittany Straza	Merion Golf Club (East Course) (PA)
1997	(United States) Beth Bauer	4 & 2	(Taiwan) (United States) Candie Kung	Legends Club of Tennessee (Ironwood Course) (TN)
1996	(United States) Dorothy Delasin	5 & 4	(South Korea) Grace Park	Westward Ho Country Club (SD)
1995	(United States) Marcy Newton	4 & 3	(United States) Andrea Cordova	Longmeadow Country Club (MA)
1994	(United States) Kelli Kuehne	5 & 3	(United States) Molly Cooper	Meadow Lark Country Club (MT)
1993	(United States) Kellee Booth	1 up	(Peru) Erika Hayashida	Mesa Verde Country Club (CA)
1992	(United States) Jamie Koizumi	5 & 4	(United States) Alicia Allison	Meridian Hills Country Club (IN)
1991	(United States) Emilee Klein	3 & 2	(Bermuda) Kimberly Marshall	Crestview Country Club (KS)
1990	(France) Sandrine Mendiburu	3 & 2	(United States) Vicki Goetze	Manasquan River Golf Club (NJ)
1989	(United States) Brandie Burton	1 up	(United States) Carrie Hoshino	Pine Needles Lodge & Golf Club (NC)
1988	(United States) Jamille Jose	5 & 4	(United States) Debbie Parks	Golden Valley Country Club (MN)
1987	(United States) Michelle McGann	7 & 5	(United States) Lynne Mikulas	The Orchards Golf Club (MA)
1986	(United States) Pat Hurst	20 holes	(United States) Adele Moore	Peach Tree Golf & Country Club (CA)
1985	(United States) Dana Lofland	4 & 3	(United States) Amy Fruhwirth	St. Clair Country Club (PA)
1984	(United States) Cathy Mockett	1 up	(Japan) Michiko Hattori	Mill Creek Country Club (WA)
1983	(United States) Kim Saiki	2 & 1	(United States) Buffy Klein	Somerset Hills Country Club (NJ)
1982	(United States) Heather Farr	2 & 1	(United States) Caroline Keggi	Greeley Country Club (CO)
1981	(United States) Kay Cornelius	2 & 1	(United States) Kim Simmons	Illahe Hills Country Club (OR)
1980	(United States) Laurie Rinker	5 & 4	(United States) Libby Akers	Crestview Country Club (North Course) (KS)
1979	(United States) Penny Hammel	2 & 1	(United States) Amy Benz	Pleasant Valley Country Club (AR)
1978	(United States) Lori Castillo	4 & 2	(Peru) Jenny Lidback	Wilmington Country Club (DE)
1977	(United States) Althea Tome	3 & 2	(United States) Melissa McGeorge	Guyan Golf & Country Club (WV)
1976	(United States) Pilar Dorado	3 & 2	(United States) Kellii Doherty	Del Rio Golf & Country Club (CA)
1975	(United States) Dayna Benson	1 up	(United States) Kyle O'Brien	Dedham Country & Polo Club (MA)
1974	(United States) Nancy Lopez	7 & 5	(United States) Lauren Howe	Columbia-Edgewater Country Club (OR)
1973	(United States) Amy Alcott	6 & 5	(United States) Mary Lawrence	Somerset Hills Country Club (NJ)
1972	(United States) Nancy Lopez	1 up	(United States) Catherine Morse	Jefferson City Country Club (MO)
1971	(United States) Hollis Stacy	19 holes	(United States) Amy Alcott	Augusta Country Club (GA)
1970	(United States) Hollis Stacy	1 up	(United States) Janet Aulisi	The Apawamis Club (NY)
1969	(United States) Hollis Stacy	1 up	(United States) Jane Fassinger	Brookhaven Country Club (Championship Course) (TX)
1968	(United States) Margaret Harmon	3 & 2	(United States) Kaye Beard	Flint Golf Club (MI)
1967	(United States) Elizabeth (Doll) Story	5 & 4	(United States) Liana Zambresky	Hacienda Golf Club (CA)
1966	(United States) Claudia Ann Mayhew	3 & 2	(United States) Kathleen Ahern	Longue Vue Club (PA)
1965	(United States) Gail Sykes	5 & 4	(United States) Mary Louise Pritchett	Hiwan Golf Club (CO)
1964	(United States) Peggy Conley	6 & 5	(United States) Laura MacIvor	Leavenworth Country Club (KS)
1963	(United States) Janis Ferraris	2 up	(United States) Peggy Conley	Wolfert’s Roost Country Club (NY)
1962	(United States) Mary Lou Daniel	2 up	(United States) Mary Sawyer	Country Club of Buffalo (NY)
1961	(United States) Mary Lowell	1 up	(United States) Margaret Martin	Broadmoor Golf Club (WA)
1960	(United States) Carol Sorenson	2 & 1	(United States) Sharon Fladoos	The Oaks Country Club (OK)
1959	(United States) Judy Rand	5 & 3	(United States) Marcia Hamilton	Manor Country Club (MD)
1958	(United States) Judy Eller	1 up	(United States) Sherry Wheeler	Greenwich Country Club (CT)
1957	(United States) Judy Eller	20 holes	(United States) Beth Stone	Lakewood Country Club (CO)
1956	(United States) JoAnne Gunderson	4 & 3	(United States) Clifford Ann Creed	Heather Downs Country Club (OH)
1955	(United States) Carole Jo Kabler	4 & 3	(United States) JoAnne Gunderson	Florence Country Club (SC)
1954	(United States) Wiffi Smith	5 & 3	(United States) Sue Driscoll	Gulph Mills Golf Club (PA)
1953	(United States) Millie Meyerson	4 & 2	(United States) Holly Jean Roth	The Country Club (MA)
1952	(United States) Mickey Wright	1 up	(United States) Barbara McIntire	Monterey Peninsula Country Club (CA)
1951	(United States) Arlene Brooks	1 up	(United States) Barbara McIntire	Onwentsia Club (IL)
1950	(United States) Patricia Lesser	4 & 2	(United States) Mickey Wright	Wanakah Country Club (NY)
1949	(United States) Marlene Bauer	2 up	(United States) Barbara Bruning	Philadelphia Country Club (Bala Course) (PA)

== Multiple winners ==
- 3 wins: Hollis Stacy
- 2 wins: Judy Eller, Nancy Lopez, Seong Eun-jeong

== Future sites ==
Year	Edition	Course	Location	Dates
2027	78th	Canterbury Golf Club	Cleveland, Ohio	July 12–17
2028	79th	Lancaster Country Club	Lancaster, Pennsylvania	July 10–15
2029	80th	Eugene Country Club	Eugene, Oregon	July 16–21
2030	81st	The Country Club	Brookline, Massachusetts	July 15–20
2031	82nd	Trinity Forest Golf Club	Dallas, Texas	July 14–19
2032	83rd	Pinehurst Resort (Course No. 2)	Pinehurst, North Carolina	July 12–17
2033	84th	Inverness Club	Toledo, Ohio	TBD
2034	85th	Sand Valley Resort	Nekoosa, Wisconsin	July 17–22
2035	86th	Bandon Dunes Golf Resort	Bandon, Oregon	July 16–21
2037	88th	Whistling Straits	Kohler, Wisconsin	July 13–18
2038	89th	Oakland Hills Country Club (South Course)	Bloomfield Hills, Michigan	TBD
2039	90th	Southern Hills Country Club	Tulsa, Oklahoma	TBD
2045	96th	Bandon Dunes Golf Resort	Bandon, Oregon	TBD

== See also ==
- U.S. Junior Amateur Golf Championship, the analogous event for boys
