= Carolyn Hill =

American professional golfer (born 1959)

Personal information
- Nationality: United States
- Born: February 1, 1959 (age 67) Santa Monica, California, U.S.
- Height: 5 ft 8 in (1.73 m)

Career
- Sport: Golf
- College: University of Miami; University of Tulsa
- Status: Professional
- Former tour: LPGA Tour (1980–1999)
- Professional wins: 1

Number of wins by tour
- LPGA Tour: 1

Best results in LPGA major championships
- Chevron Championship: T52: 1984
- Women's PGA C'ship: T14: 1989
- U.S. Women's Open: T24: 1995
- du Maurier Classic: T28: 1980

Carolyn Hill (born February 1, 1959) is an American professional golfer who played on the LPGA Tour. She attended El Dorado High School in Placentia, California. Hill played on the boy's varsity golf team.

== Career ==
Hill won the 1979 U.S. Women's Amateur and played on the 1978 U.S. Curtis Cup team.

Hill won once on the LPGA Tour in 1994. Hill's win came in her 359th start, the tour record for most starts before a first win. A 1996 car accident slowed her touring career and she became a club professional in California.

== Professional wins ==
=== LPGA Tour wins (1) ===
No.	Date	Tournament	Winning score	Margin of victory	Runner-up
1	Aug 7, 1994	McCall's LPGA Classic	–13 (69-72-65-69=275)	3 strokes	(United States) Nancy Ramsbottom

== Team appearances ==
Amateur

- Curtis Cup (representing the United States): 1978 (winners)
