= Trinity Forest Golf Club =

Golf club in Dallas, Texas

- Location within the United States Location within Texas
- 32.71°N 96.723°W

Club information
- Location: Dallas, Texas, U.S.
- Elevation: 390 feet (120 m)
- Established: 2014
- Type: Private
- Tota holes: 18
- Tournaments: AT&T Byron Nelson (2018, 2019), U.S. Junior Amateur (2025), U.S. Girls' Junior (2031)
- Greens: Champion Bermuda
- Fairways: Trinity Zoysia
- Website: trinityforestgc.com
- Designed by: Bill Coore and Ben Crenshaw
- Par: 72
- Length: 7,450 yards (6,812 m)
- Course rating: 76.0
- Slope rating: 134
- Course record: 61 Marc Leishman (2018), 61 Kang Sung-hoon (2019)

Trinity Forest Golf Club is an 18-hole private golf club in the southern United States, located in Dallas, Texas.

Southeast of downtown Dallas, the club was founded in 2014 and the course opened for play in autumn 2016. Built on a former landfill, the treeless links-style course was designed by Bill Coore and Ben Crenshaw and features diversely architectured holes over undulating terrain.

Trinity Forest became the host course for the AT&T Byron Nelson on the PGA Tour in 2018, held in May. However, after years of declining revenue, along with other issues such as lack of entertainment and dining options in the area, the PGA Tour removed it from the 2020 schedule and moved the event to the TPC Craig Ranch when the event was revived for 2021. It is also the home of the SMU Mustangs men's and women's college golf teams.

In 2023, The USGA and Trinity Forest Golf Club announced it will host the U.S. Junior Amateur (in 2025), and its female equivalent, the U.S. Girls' Junior (in 2031).

== Course ==
Hole	Yards	Par	Hole	Yards	Par
1	552	5	10	416	4
2	241	3	11	537	5
3	412	4	12	205	3
4	443	4	13	480	4
5	315	4	14	630	5
6	420	4	15	440	4
7	570	5	16	429	4
8	138	3	17	215	3
9	505	4	18	502	4
Out	3,596	36	In	3,854	36
Source:			Total	7,450	72

- The approximate average elevation is 390 feet (120 m) above sea level
