= Highland Meadows Golf Club =

American Private Golf Club in Syvlania, Ohio

- Location within the United States Location within Ohio
- 41.718°N 83.723°W

Club information
- Location: Sylvania, Ohio
- Elevation: 660 feet (200 m)
- Established: 1925; 101 years ago
- Type: Private
- Tota holes: 18
- Tournaments: Dana Open (1989–present)
- Greens: Bentgrass / Poa annua
- Fairways: Bentgrass / Poa annua
- Website: hmgolfclub.org
- Par: 71
- Length: 6,686 yards (6,114 m)
- Course rating: 72.9
- Slope rating: 138

Highland Meadows Golf Club is a private country club and golf course in the central United States, located in Sylvania, Ohio, a suburb northwest of Toledo. Founded 101 years ago in 1925, it has hosted the Dana Open on the LPGA Tour since 1989; the event began in 1984 as the Jamie Farr Toledo Classic.

== Course ==
| Hole | Yards | Par | Hole | Yards | Par |
|---|---|---|---|---|---|
| 1 | 376 | 4 | 10 | 352 | 4 |
| 2 | 424 | 4 | 11 | 166 | 3 |
| 3 | 402 | 4 | 12 | 397 | 4 |
| 4 | 352 | 4 | 13 | 388 | 4 |
| 5 | 203 | 3 | 14 | 445 | 4 |
| 6 | 405 | 4 | 15 | 173 | 3 |
| 7 | 415 | 4 | 16 | 596 | 5 |
| 8 | 527 | 5 | 17 | 139 | 3 |
| 9 | 531 | 5 | 18 | 395 | 4 |
| Out | 3,635 | 37 | In | 3,051 | 34 |
| Source: | | | Total | 6,686 | 71 |

- For the LPGA Tour event, the nines are switched.
