= Canyon Gate Country Club =

Golf club in Nevada, United States

Coordinates: 36°8′55″N 115°17′14″W

Canyon Gate Country Club is a golf club to the west of Las Vegas, Nevada. The 6742 yard course was established in 1989, and was designed by Ted Robinson. It hosted the Las Vegas LPGA in 1993. The club also has amenities for tennis, swimming and fitness. The men's card room and bar were designed by Chris Consultants.
