= 2008 Legends Tour =

The 2008 Legends Tour was a series of professional golf tours for women aged 45 and older sanctioned by the Legends Tour. Based in the United States, it is an offshoot of the main U.S.-based women's tour, the LPGA Tour. The tour was founded in 2001, and is intended to allow women to prolong their competitive golf careers on the model of the successful Champions Tour for men.

== Schedule and results ==
In 2008, the Legends Tour had four events. The number in brackets after each winner's name is the number of Legends Tour events she had won up to and including that tournament.

| Dates | Tournament | Location | Winner |
|---|---|---|---|
| Jun 23 | Duane Reade Charity Classic | New Jersey | Patty Sheehan's Team |
| Aug 2–3 | BJ's Charity Championship | Massachusetts | (United States) Cindy Figg-Currier (1) & Sherri Turner (1) |
| Aug 10 | Wendy's Charity Challenge | Michigan | (United States) Cindy Figg-Currier (2) |
| Dec 5–6 | Handa Cup | Florida | (United States) Team USA |

== See also ==
- Professional golf tours
