= Cindy Schreyer =

American professional golfer (born 1963)

Personal information
- Full name: Cynthia Schreyer
- Nationality: United States
- Born: January 21, 1963 (age 63) Forest Park, Georgia, U.S.
- Height: 5 ft 7 in (1.70 m)

Career
- Sport: Golf
- College: University of Georgia
- Status: Professional
- Former tours: LPGA Tour (1989–2004); Futures Tour (1987–1988)
- Professional wins: 3

Number of wins by tour
- LPGA Tour: 1
- Epson Tour: 2

Best results in LPGA major championships
- Chevron Championship: T13: 1999
- Women's PGA C'ship: T36: 2000
- U.S. Women's Open: T14: 1996
- du Maurier Classic: T18: 1995
- Women's British Open: T46: 2001

Achievements and awards
- Broderick Award: 1984

Cynthia "Cindy" Schreyer (born January 21, 1963) is an American professional golfer who played on the LPGA Tour. She also competed as Cindy McCurdy from 1998 to 2000.

== Career ==
Schreyer started playing golf at the age of 15.

Schreyer won several amateur tournaments including the NCAA Women's Division I Championship in 1984 and the U.S. Women's Amateur Public Links in 1986. While at the University of Georgia, she won the Broderick Award (now the Honda Sports Award) as the nation's best female collegiate golfer in 1984.

She played on the U.S. Curtis Cup team in 1986.

== Professional career ==
Schreyer played on the Futures Tour in 1987 and 1988, winning twice.

Schreyer played on the LPGA Tour from 1989 to 2004, winning once in 1993. In the three years from 1999 to 2001, Schreyer held positions on the LPGA Tour Player Executive Committee, including the Presidency (1999–2000).

Schreyer won $1,473,602 in prize money on the LPGA Tour over the course of her career.

== Awards and honors ==
In 1984, Schreyer earned the Broderick Award in the golf category. The award is bestowed to the top college player in a certain category.

== Professional wins (3) ==
=== LPGA Tour wins (1) ===
No.	Date	Tournament	Winning score	Margin of victory	Runner-up
1	Aug 15, 1993	Sun-Times Challenge	–16 (67-68-66-71=272)	1 stroke	(United States) Betsy King

=== Futures Tour wins (2) ===
- 1987 Ravines Classic
- 1988 LaGrange Honda Classic

== Team appearances ==
Amateur

- Curtis Cup (representing the United States): 1986
