= Hawaiian Ladies Open =

Golf tournament

Tournament information
- Location: Oahu
- Established: 1987
- Tour: LPGA Tour
- Final year: 2001

Final champion
- Catriona Matthew

The Hawaiian Ladies Open was a golf tournament on the LPGA Tour from 1987 to 2001. It was played at three different courses on the Hawaiian island of Oahu.

== Tournament courses ==
- 1987–1989 Turtle Bay Resort, Kahuku, Hawaii
- 1990–1995 Ko Olina Golf Club, 'Ewa Beach, Hawaii
- 1996–2001 Kapolei Golf Course, Kapolei, Hawaii

== Winners ==
Year	Winner	Score	To par	Margin of victory	Runner(s)-up	Purse ($)	Winner's share ($)	Ref.
Cup Noodles Hawaiian Ladies Open
2001	(Scotland) Catriona Matthew							
2000	(United States) Betsy King							
Sunrise Hawaiian Ladies Open
1999	(England) Alison Nicholas							
Cup Noodles Hawaiian Ladies Open
1998	(United States) Wendy Ward							
1997	(Sweden) Annika Sörenstam							
1996	(United States) Meg Mallon							
1995	(United States) Barb Thomas							
1994	(Spain) Marta Figueras-Dotti							
Itoki Hawaiian Ladies Open
1993	(Canada) Lisa Walters							
1992	(Canada) Lisa Walters							
Orix Hawaiian Ladies Open
1991	(United States) Patty Sheehan							
1990	(United States) Beth Daniel							
1989	(United States) Sherri Turner	205	−11	4 strokes	(United States) Sara Anne McGetrick	300,000	45,000	
Orient Leasing Hawaiian Ladies Open
1988	(Japan) Ayako Okamoto	213	−3	1 stroke	(United States) JoAnne Carner (United States) Deb Richard	300,000	45,000	
Tsumura Hawaiian Ladies Open
1987	(United States) Cindy Rarick	207	−9	2 strokes	(United States) Jane Geddes	300,000	45,000	
