= Kristi Albers =

American professional golfer

Personal information
- Nationality: United States
- Born: December 7, 1963 (age 62) El Paso, Texas, U.S.
- Height: 5 ft 7 in (1.70 m)

Career
- Sport: Golf
- College: University of New Mexico
- Status: Professional
- Former tour: LPGA Tour (1986-2007)
- Professional wins: 1

Number of wins by tour
- LPGA Tour: 1

Best results in LPGA major championships
- Chevron Championship: 14th: 2000
- Women's PGA C'ship: T9: 2002
- U.S. Women's Open: T7: 2001
- du Maurier Classic: T6: 1992
- Women's British Open: DNP

Kristi Albers (born December 7, 1963) is an American professional golfer who played on the LPGA Tour. She also played under her maiden name Kristi Arrington before her marriage in 1987.

== Career ==
Albers won once on the LPGA Tour in 1993.

== Professional wins (1) ==
=== LPGA Tour wins (1) ===
No.	Date	Tournament	Winning score	Margin of Victory	Runner-up
1	May 2, 1993	Sprint Classic	-9 (66-69-72-72=279)	1 stroke	(United States) Rosie Jones
