= Lisa Kiggens =

American professional golfer (born 1972

Personal information
- Nationality: United States
- Born: August 13, 1972 (age 54) Salinas, California, U.S.
- Height: 5 ft 5 in (1.65 m)

Career
- Sport: Golf
- College: UCLA
- Status: Professional
- Former tour: LPGA Tour (1992–2003)
- Professional wins: 1

Number of wins by tour
- LPGA Tour: 1

Best results in LPGA major championships
- Chevron Championship: T62: 1999
- Women's PGA C'ship: T14: 1996
- U.S. Women's Open: T25: 1999
- du Maurier Classic: T27: 1998
- Women's British Open: DNP

Lisa Kiggens (born August 13, 1972) is an American professional golfer who played on the LPGA Tour.

Kiggens was born in Salinas, California. She played college golf for one year at UCLA, earning All-American honors and helping her team win the NCAA Women's Division I Golf Championship.

Kiggens played on the LPGA Tour from 1992 to 2003, winning once in 1994.

== Professional wins ==
=== LPGA Tour wins (1) ===
No.	Date	Tournament	Winning score	Margin of victory	Runner-up
1	Jun 19, 1994	Rochester International	–15 (67-69-71-66=273)	1 stroke	(Canada) Dawn Coe-Jones
