= Greater Toledo Classic =

Golf tournament

Tournament information
- Location: Sylvania, Ohio, U.S.
- Established: 1984, 42 years ago
- Course: Highland Meadows Golf Club
- Par: 71
- Length: 6,666 yards (6,095 m)
- Tour(s): Epson Tour (2025–); Legends of the LPGA (2025); LPGA Tour (1984–2024)
- Format: Stroke play – 54 holes
- Prize fund: $250,000
- Month played: July

Tournament record score
- Aggregate: 261 Se Ri Pak (1998)

Current champion
- (United States) Annabelle Pancake-Webb

Location in the United States
Location in Ohio

The Greater Toledo Classic is a women's professional golf tournament on the Legends of the LPGA and Epson Tours. It was founded in 1984 as an LPGA Tour event and has been played yearly, except in 1986 and 2011, in Sylvania, Ohio, a suburb northwest of Toledo.

== History ==
The tournament was founded after PGA Tour caddie Judd Silverman, a Toledo native, sought to bring a ladies professional golf tournament to his hometown. He contacted sponsors and actor Jamie Farr, also a Toledo native, brought his name and several of his celebrity friends to the tournament. Throughout the history of the event, children's charities in Northwest Ohio and Southern Michigan have been the charitable beneficiaries of the tournament. They have received more than $14 million during the event's history.

From 2004 to 2010, the title sponsor was Owens Corning, the world's largest manufacturer of fiberglass and related products, headquartered in Toledo, near the site of the tournament. In 2012, they became a presenting sponsor. Kroger, one of the largest American supermarket chains, with headquarters in Cincinnati, has also been involved as a sponsor of the tournament since 1997. Owens-Illinois (O-I) became a sponsor in 2012.

From 1984 to 1988, the tournament was held in the village of Holland at Glengarry Country Club (41.635°N 83.755°W), which became Stone Oak Country Club in 1988. The event moved several miles north in 1989 to its current home, Highland Meadows Golf Club in Sylvania, just south of the Michigan state line.

The largest playoff in LPGA history took place at the 1999 Jamie Farr, a six-player affair involving Karrie Webb, Carin Koch, Sherri Steinhauer, Se Ri Pak, Kelli Kuehne, and Mardi Lunn. Defending champion Pak won it on first hole of sudden death, sinking a ten-foot (3 m) birdie putt.

In 2007, Pak won the Farr for the fifth time, becoming only the fourth player on the LPGA Tour to win the same tournament five times.

The tournament was at risk of ending after 2009, due to a variety of circumstances including the slumping worldwide economy and reported dissatisfaction with LPGA Commissioner Carolyn Bivens. Late in August 2009, after Bivens had resigned under pressure, it was announced that the tournament would continue for at least one more year, albeit with a sharply reduced purse.

On June 29, 2010, LPGA Commissioner Michael Whan announced the Farr Classic would return for at least three more years beginning in 2012. The tournament took a one-year hiatus in 2011, as the Toledo area hosted the U.S. Senior Open, a major championship on the Champions Tour, at the Inverness Club in late July. A similar break occurred in 1986, when the PGA Championship was at Inverness in August.

On December 2, 2011, tournament director Judd Silverman announced that the Jamie Farr Classic would have a new name and a new logo; it became the Jamie Farr Toledo Classic Presented by Kroger, Owens Corning and O-I. On January 8, 2013, the LPGA announced that Marathon Petroleum was replacing Jamie Farr as the title sponsor. In 2016, the event received broadcast network coverage for the first time when CBS Sports televised the final round live. In 2022, Dana Incorporated took over title sponsorship of the tournament for three years.

After celebrating its 40th anniversary in 2024, the tournament decided to bring a new professional golf tournament to northwest Ohio – the "Greater Toledo Classic". In place of its annual LPGA tournament, tournament director Judd Silverman collaborated with the LPGA to bring the Epson Tour and Legends of the LPGA tours together for a dual event. Stacy Lewis, Toledo native and two-time Solheim Cup captain, will host the event. The inaugural tournament took place July 25–27, 2025 at Highland Meadows Golf Club.

Tournament names through the years:

- 1984–1996: Jamie Farr Toledo Classic
- 1997–2000: Jamie Farr Kroger Classic
- 2001–2003: Jamie Farr Kroger Classic Presented by ALLTEL
- 2004–2010: Jamie Farr Owens Corning Classic Presented by Kroger
- 2012: Jamie Farr Toledo Classic Presented by Kroger, Owens Corning and O-I
- 2013–2018: Marathon Classic Presented by Owens Corning and O-I
- 2019–2021: Marathon Classic Presented by Dana
- 2022–2022: Dana Open Presented by Marathon
- 2023–2024: Dana Open
- 2025: Greater Toledo Classic hosted by Stacy Lewis
- 2026: Greater Toledo Classic

== Winners ==
Year	Date	Champion	Country	Winning score	To par	Margin of victory	Venue	Purse ($)	Winner's share ($)
As an Epson Tour event
2026	Jul 19	Annabelle Pancake-Webb	United States	66-67=133	−9	2 strokes	Highland Meadows Golf Club	250,000	37,500
As an Epson Tour and Legends of the LPGA event
2025	Jul 27	Mia Hammond (a)	United States	66-66-69=201	−12	1 stroke	Highland Meadows Golf Club	300,000	45,000
As an LPGA Tour event
2024	Jul 21	Chanettee Wannasaen	Thailand	66-65-66-67=264	−20	1 stroke	Highland Meadows Golf Club	1,750,000	262,500
2023	Jul 16	Linn Grant	Sweden	64-69-62-68=263	−21	3 strokes	Highland Meadows Golf Club	1,750,000	262,500
2022	Sep 4	Gaby López	Mexico	67-70-66-63=266	−18	1 stroke	Highland Meadows Golf Club	1,750,000	262,500
2021	Jul 11	Nasa Hataoka	Japan	61-69-64=194 †	−19	6 strokes	Highland Meadows Golf Club	2,000,000	300,000
2020	Aug 9	Danielle Kang	United States	64-67-70-68=269	−15	1 stroke	Highland Meadows Golf Club	2,000,000	255,000
2019	Jul 14	Kim Sei-young	South Korea	67-64-66-65=262	−22	2 strokes	Highland Meadows Golf Club	1,750,000	262,500
2018	Jul 15	Thidapa Suwannapura	Thailand	65-69-71-65=270	−14	Playoff	Highland Meadows Golf Club	1,600,000	240,000
2017	Jul 23	In-Kyung Kim	South Korea	65-67-68-63=263	−21	4 strokes	Highland Meadows Golf Club	1,600,000	240,000
2016	Jul 17	Lydia Ko (2)	New Zealand	68-66-67-69=270	−14	Playoff	Highland Meadows Golf Club	1,500,000	225,000
2015	Jul 19	Chella Choi	South Korea	73-66-65-66=270	−14	Playoff	Highland Meadows Golf Club	1,500,000	225,000
2014	Jul 20	Lydia Ko	New Zealand	67-67-70-65=269	−15	1 stroke	Highland Meadows Golf Club	1,400,000	210,000
2013	Jul 21	Beatriz Recari	Spain	69-65-67-66=267	−17	1 stroke	Highland Meadows Golf Club	1,300,000	195,000
2012	Aug 12	So Yeon Ryu	South Korea	67-68-67-62=264	−20	7 strokes	Highland Meadows Golf Club	1,300,000	195,000
2011	No tournament, area hosted U.S. Senior Open in July								
2010	Jul 4	Na Yeon Choi	South Korea	64-67-68-71=270	−14	Playoff	Highland Meadows Golf Club	1,000,000	150,000
2009	Jul 5	Eunjung Yi	South Korea	68-66-61-71=266	−18	Playoff	Highland Meadows Golf Club	1,400,000	210,000
2008	Jul 13	Paula Creamer	United States	60-65-70-73=268	−16	2 strokes	Highland Meadows Golf Club	1,300,000	195,000
2007	Jul 15	Se Ri Pak (5)	South Korea	63-68-69-67=267	−17	3 strokes	Highland Meadows Golf Club	1,300,000	195,000
2006	Jul 16	Mi Hyun Kim	South Korea	68-66-67-65=266	−18	Playoff	Highland Meadows Golf Club	1,200,000	180,000
2005	Jul10	Heather Bowie	United States	72-66-69-67=274	−10	Playoff	Highland Meadows Golf Club	1,200,000	180,000
2004	Aug 8	Meg Mallon	United States	66-69-74-68=277	−7	1 stroke	Highland Meadows Golf Club	1,100,000	165,000
2003	Aug 17	Se Ri Pak (4)	South Korea	69-67-64-71=271	−13	2 strokes	Highland Meadows Golf Club	1,000,000	150,000
2002	Jul 14	Rachel Teske	Australia	67-73-64-66=270	−14	2 strokes	Highland Meadows Golf Club	1,000,000	150,000
2001	Jul 8	Se Ri Pak (3)	South Korea	70-62-69-68=269	−15	2 strokes	Highland Meadows Golf Club	1,000,000	150,000
2000	Jul 9	Annika Sörenstam	Sweden	70-67-66-71=274	−10	Playoff	Highland Meadows Golf Club	1,000,000	150,000
1999	Jul 4	Se Ri Pak (2)	South Korea	68-69-68-71=276	−8	Playoff	Highland Meadows Golf Club	900,000	135,000
1998	Jul 12	Se Ri Pak	South Korea	71-61-63-66=261	−23	9 strokes	Highland Meadows Golf Club	800,000	120,000
1997	Jul 6	Kelly Robbins (2)	United States	67-64-67-67=265	−19	8 strokes	Highland Meadows Golf Club	700,000	105,000
1996	Jul 7	Joan Pitcock	United States	68-66-70=204	−9	1 stroke	Highland Meadows Golf Club	575,000	86,250
1995	Jul 9	Kathryn Marshall	Scotland	67-71-67=205	−8	1 stroke	Highland Meadows Golf Club	500,000	75,000
1994	Jul 10	Kelly Robbins	United States	69-70-65=204	−9	Playoff	Highland Meadows Golf Club	500,000	75,000
1993	Jul 4	Brandie Burton	United States	68-66-67=201	−12	1 stroke	Highland Meadows Golf Club	500,000	75,000
1992	Jul 5	Patty Sheehan	United States	70-73-66=209	−4	1 stroke	Highland Meadows Golf Club	400,000	60,000
1991	Jul 7	Alice Miller	United States	69-66-70=205	−8	Playoff	Highland Meadows Golf Club	350,000	52,500
1990	Jul 8	Tina Purtzer	Canada	67-72-66=205	−8	4 strokes	Highland Meadows Golf Club	325,000	48,750
1989	Jul 9	Penny Hammel (2)	United States	69-66-71=206	−7	2 strokes	Highland Meadows Golf Club	275,000	41,250
1988	Jun 5	Laura Davies	England	69-70-69-69=277	−11	3 strokes	Glengarry Country Club	275,000	41,250
1987	Jul 5	Jane Geddes	United States	71-73-69-67=280	−8	2 strokes	Glengarry Country Club	225,000	33,750
1986	No tournament, area hosted PGA Championship in August								
1985	Aug 4	Penny Hammel	United States	72-69-72-65=278	−10	1 stroke	Glengarry Country Club	175,000	26,250
1984	Jul 8	Lauri Peterson	United States	68-72-65-73=278	−10	2 strokes	Glengarry Country Club	175,000	26,250

Notes: Green highlight indicates scoring records.

† 2021 event was rain-shortened to 54 holes

=== Multiple winners ===
Four players have won the event more than once.

- 5 wins: Se Ri Pak (1998, 1999, 2001, 2003, 2007)
- 2 wins: Penny Hammel (1985, 1989), Kelly Robbins (1994, 1997), and Lydia Ko (2014, 2016)

== Tournament records ==
Year	Player	Score	To par	Round	Course
2008	Paula Creamer	60	−11	1st	Highland Meadows Golf Club

== See also ==
- Glass City Classic: a LPGA Tour event that was played at Highland Meadows Golf Club in 1966.
