= Washington Golf =

Washington Golf (WA Golf)
- Abbreviation: WA Golf
- Formation: 1922
- Type: Non-profit Golf Association
- Location: Tacoma, Washington
- Parent organization: United States Golf Association
- Website: wagolf.org

Washington Golf (WA Golf) formerly Washington State Golf Association (WSGA) was established in 1922 and is an allied golf association of the United States Golf Association (USGA). WA Golf provides handicapping services for its members and member clubs in Washington and Northern Idaho and creates opportunities to play and develop their passion for golf. WA Golf administers the state amateur championships and USGA Qualifiers. WA Golf had over 96,000 members at more than 550 member clubs in 2024. Membership includes a USGA Handicap Index through the USGA GHIN System.

In September 2019, the Washington State Golf Association was re-branded as Washington Golf (WA Golf).

== Championships ==
WA Golf conducts 14 state amateur championships each year.

- Men's Amateur Championship
- Women's Amateur Championship
- Men's Mid-Amateur Championship
- Women's Mid-Amateur Championship
- Senior Men's Amateur Championship
- Senior Women's Amateur Championship
- Super Senior Men's Amateur Championship
- Super Senior Women's Amateur Championship
- Men's Four-Ball Championship
- Senior Men's Four-Ball Championship
- Women's Four-Ball
- Champion of Champions
- Parent-Child Championship
- Mixed Chapman Championship
