= Seong Eun-jeong =

South Korean Professional golfer (born 1999)

Personal information
- Nationality: South Korea
- Born: 31 October 1999 (age 27)
- Height: 5 ft 5 in (165 cm)

Career
- Sport: Golf
- Turned professional: 2017
- Current tour: KLPGA Dream Tour
- Former tour: Symetra Tour
- Professional wins: 1

Number of wins by tour
- Epson Tour: 1

Best results in LPGA major championships
- Chevron Championship: CUT: 2017
- Women's PGA C'ship: DNP
- U.S. Women's Open: CUT: 2017
- Women's British Open: CUT: 2017
- Evian Championship: CUT: 2016

Seong Eun-jeong (born 31 October 1999) is a South Korean professional golfer. Before turning professional, she won the 2016 U.S. Women's Amateur. Her win granted her exemptions into several majors on the LPGA Tour from 2016 to 2017. At the 2017 ANA Inspiration, she became the first amateur golfer to score a hole in one at the event. As a professional golfer, Seong won her first professional golf tournament at the Danielle Downey Credit Union Classic during the 2018 Symetra Tour.

== Career ==
As an amateur golfer, Seong participated at events held by the United States Golf Association. She competed at the 2013 U.S. Women's Amateur but did not make the cut. The following year, Seong was runner up at the 2014 U.S. Women's Amateur Public Links. Her first amateur wins came at the U.S. Girls' Junior in 2015 and 2016. After winning her second Junior championship, Seong won the 2016 U.S. Women's Amateur. Her 2016 wins made Seong the first golfer to win both the Junior and Amateur championships within the same year. After she won the U.S. Amateur, Seong received an exemption to the 2017 U.S. Women's Open and potential invitations to the 2016 Evian Championship, 2017 ANA Inspiration and 2017 Women's British Open.

At major championships, Seong did not make the cut at the 2016 Evian Championship. The following year, she was the first ever amateur golfer to score a hole in one at the 2017 ANA Inspiration. Her ace was the latest at the tournament since 2012. Seong did not make the cut at the ANA Inspiration in 2017. At subsequent 2017 major championships, Seong missed the cut at the U.S. Women's Open and Women's British Open. Outside of the LPGA, Seong began playing on the Symetra Tour in May 2018. A few months later, she won the Danielle Downey Credit Union Classic and obtained her first win as a professional golfer during the 2018 Symetra Tour season. Her best finish the following year was a fourth place tie at the Symetra Classic.

== Amateur wins ==
- 2014 Song Am Cup, Daebo Group Cup Maekyung Amateur
- 2015 U.S. Girls' Junior
- 2016 U.S. Girls' Junior, U.S. Women's Amateur

== Symetra Tour wins ==
- 2018 Danielle Downey Credit Union Classic
