= Amy Benz =

American professional golfer

Personal information
- Nationality: United States
- Born: May 12, 1962 (age 64)

Career
- Sport: Golf
- College: Southern Methodist
- Turned professional: 1983
- Former tour: LPGA Tour
- Professional wins: 3

Number of wins by tour
- LPGA of Japan Tour: 2
- Other: 1

Best results in LPGA major championships
- Chevron Championship: T2: 1993
- Women's PGA C'ship: T3: 1988
- U.S. Women's Open: T6: 1988
- du Maurier Classic: T12: 1990

Amy Benz (born May 12, 1962) is an American professional golfer who played on the LPGA Tour.

As an amateur, Benz won the 1982 AIAW National Championship, was an AIAW Southern Methodist University All-American and was part of the team that won the 1982 Curtis Cup and the 1982 Espirito Santo Trophy. Other wins include the 1981 Women's Western Amateur, the Orange Bowl Classic and the American Junior Golf Association Tournament of Champions.

Benz played on the LPGA Tour from 1983 to 2000. She never won on tour but had five runner-up finishes: 1990 Orix Hawaiian Ladies Open, 1992 Sara Lee Classic, 1993 Nabisco Dinah Shore, 1993 ShopRite LPGA Classic, 1996 ShopRite LPGA Classic. She won the unofficial mixed-team JCPenney Classic with John Huston in 1988 and won twice on the LPGA of Japan Tour, the 1989 Fujitsu Ladies and the 1991 Daikin Orchid Ladies Golf Tournament.

== Amateur wins ==
- 1978 Orange Bowl Classic
- 1979 AJGA Tournament of Champions
- 1981 Women's Western Amateur
- 1982 AIAW National Championship

== Professional wins ==
=== LPGA of Japan Tour wins ===
- 1989 Fujitsu Ladies
- 1991 Daikin Orchid Ladies

=== Other wins ===
- 1988 JCPenney Classic (with John Huston)

== U.S. national team appearances ==
Amateur

- Curtis Cup: 1982 (winners)
- Espirito Santo Trophy: 1982 (winners)
