= Las Vegas LPGA =

Former American golf tournament, from 1990 to 1993

The Las Vegas LPGA was a golf tournament on the LPGA Tour from 1990 to 1993. It was played in Las Vegas, Nevada at the Desert Inn Country Club from 1990 to 1992 and the Canyon Gate Country Club in 1993.

== Winners ==
Las Vegas LPGA

- 1993 Trish Johnson

Las Vegas LPGA International

- 1992 Dana Lofland

Desert Inn LPGA International

- 1991 Penny Hammel
- 1990 Maggie Will
