= Michelle Estill =

American professional golfer (born 1962)

Personal information
- Nationality: United States
- Born: November 1, 1962 (age 64) Scottsdale, Arizona, U.S.
- Height: 5 ft 8 in (1.73 m)

Career
- Sport: Golf
- College: Arizona State University
- Status: Professional
- Former tours: LPGA Tour (1991–2006); Legends Tour
- Professional wins: 2

Number of wins by tour
- LPGA Tour: 1
- Epson Tour: 1

Best results in LPGA major championships
- Chevron Championship: T16: 1995
- Women's PGA C'ship: T11: 1991
- U.S. Women's Open: T12: 1994
- du Maurier Classic: T4: 1998
- Women's British Open: T21: 2004

Michelle Estill (born November 1, 1962) is an American professional golfer who played on the LPGA Tour.

== Career ==
Estill won once on the LPGA Tour in 1991.

== Professional wins (2) ==
=== LPGA Tour wins (1) ===
No.	Date	Tournament	Winning score	Margin of victory	Runner-up
1	Sep 8, 1991	Ping-Cellular One LPGA Golf Championship	−9 (69-69-70=208)	1 stroke	(United States) Rosie Jones

=== Futures Tour wins (1) ===
- 1989 Plantation Futures Classic
