= McCall's LPGA Classic =

Golf tournament formerly on the LPGA Tour

The McCall's LPGA Classic was a golf tournament on the LPGA Tour from 1990 to 1995. It was played at the Stratton Mountain Country Club in Stratton Mountain, Vermont.

== Winners ==
McCall's LPGA Classic at Stratton Mountain

- 1995 Dottie Mochrie
- 1994 Carolyn Hill
- 1993 Dana Lofland-Dormann
- 1992 Florence Descampe

Stratton Mountain LPGA Classic

- 1991 Melissa McNamara
- 1990 Cathy Gerring
