= Missie Berteotti =

American professional golfer (born 1963)

Personal information
- Nationality: United States
- Born: September 22, 1963 (age 63) Pittsburgh, Pennsylvania, U.S.
- Height: 5 ft 10 in (1.78 m)

Career
- Sport: Golf
- College: University of Miami
- Turned professional: 1985
- Former tour: LPGA Tour (1986-1999)
- Professional wins: 1

Number of wins by tour
- LPGA Tour: 1

Best results in LPGA major championships
- Chevron Championship: T5: 1993
- Women's PGA C'ship: 8th: 1988
- U.S. Women's Open: T6: 1988
- du Maurier Classic: 5th: 1990

Missie Berteotti (born September 22, 1963) is an American professional golfer who played on the LPGA Tour.

== Career ==
Berteotti won once on the LPGA Tour in 1993.

== Professional wins (1) ==
=== LPGA Tour wins (1) ===
No.	Date	Tournament	Winning score	Margin of victory	Runner-up
1	Aug 1, 1993	PING/Welch's Championship (Massachusetts)	−12 (73-66-69-68=276)	Playoff	(United States) Dottie Mochrie

LPGA Tour playoff record (1–0)

No.	Year	Tournament	Opponent	Result
1	1993	PING/Welch's Championship (Massachusetts)	(United States) Dottie Mochrie	Won with birdie on fifth extra hole
