= Chicago Challenge =

American golf tournament (1991–1994)

The Chicago Challenge was a golf tournament on the LPGA Tour from 1991 to 1994. It was played in the Chicago, Illinois area: at the Oak Brook Golf Club in Oak Brook in 1991 and at the White Eagle Golf Club in Naperville from 1992 to 1994. The title sponsor for the first three years was the Chicago Sun-Times.

== Winners ==
Chicago Challenge

- 1994 Jane Geddes

Sun-Times Challenge

- 1993 Cindy Schreyer
- 1992 Dottie Mochrie

LPGA Chicago Sun-Times Shoot-Out

- 1991 Martha Nause
