= 1992 LPGA Tour =

Golf tour season

1992 LPGA Tour season
- Duration: January 30, 1992 – November 8, 1992
- Number of official events: 34
- Most wins: 4 (United States) Dottie Mochrie
- Money leader: (United States) Dottie Mochrie
- Player of the Year: (United States) Dottie Mochrie
- Vare Trophy: (United States) Dottie Mochrie
- Rookie of the Year: (Sweden) Helen Alfredsson

The 1992 LPGA Tour was the 43rd season since the LPGA Tour officially began in 1950. The season ran from January 30 to November 8. The season consisted of 34 official money events. Dottie Mochrie won the most tournaments, four. She also led the money list with earnings of $693,335.

There were eight first-time winners in 1992: Brandie Burton, Dawn Coe, Florence Descampe, Dana Lofland, Sherri Steinhauer, Kris Tschetter, Lisa Walters, and Jennifer Wyatt.

The tournament results and award winners are listed below.

== Tournament results ==
The following table shows all the official money events for the 1992 season. "Date" is the ending date of the tournament. The numbers in parentheses after the winners' names are the number of wins they had on the tour up to and including that event. Majors are shown in bold.

Date	Tournament	Location	Winner	Score	Purse ($)	1st prize ($)
Feb 2	Oldsmobile LPGA Classic	Florida	(United States) Colleen Walker (5)	279 (−9)	400,000	60,000
Feb 9	The Phar-Mor at Inverrary	Florida	(United States) Shelley Hamlin (2)	206 (−10)	500,000	75,000
Feb 22	Itoki Hawaiian Ladies Open	Hawaii	(Canada) Lisa Walters (1)	208 (−8)	400,000	60,000
Feb 29	Women's Kemper Open	Hawaii	(Canada) Dawn Coe (1)	275 (−13)	500,000	75,000
Mar 8	Inamori Classic	California	(United States) Judy Dickinson (4)	277 (−11)	425,000	63,750
Mar 15	Ping/Welch's Championship	Arizona	(United States) Brandie Burton (1)	277 (−11)	400,000	60,000
Mar 22	Standard Register PING	Arizona	(United States) Danielle Ammaccapane (2)	279 (−13)	550,000	82,500
Mar 29	**Nabisco Dinah Shore**	California	(United States) **Dottie Mochrie (3)**	279 (−9)	700,000	105,000
Apr 5	Las Vegas LPGA International	Nevada	(United States) Dana Lofland (1)	212 (−4)	450,000	67,500
Apr 19	Sega Women's Championship	Georgia	(United States) Dottie Mochrie (4)	277 (−11)	600,000	90,000
Apr 26	Sara Lee Classic	Tennessee	(United States) Maggie Will (2)	207 (−9)	525,000	78,750
May 3	Centel Classic	Florida	(United States) Danielle Ammaccapane (3)	275 (−13)	1,200,000	180,000
May 10	Crestar-Farm Fresh Classic	Virginia	(Canada) Jennifer Wyatt (1)	208 (−8)	425,000	63,750
May 17	**Mazda LPGA Championship**	Maryland	(United States) **Betsy King (26)**	267 (−17)	1,000,000	150,000
May 24	LPGA Corning Classic	New York	(United States) Colleen Walker (6)	276 (−12)	450,000	67,500
May 31	Oldsmobile Classic	Michigan	(United States) Barb Mucha (2)	276 (−12)	500,000	75,000
Jun 7	McDonald's Championship	Delaware	(Japan) Ayako Okamoto (17)	205 (−8)	750,000	112,500
Jun 14	ShopRite LPGA Classic	New Jersey	(France) Anne Marie Palli (2)	207 (−6)	400,000	60,000
Jun 21	Lady Keystone Open	Pennsylvania	(United States) Danielle Ammaccapane (4)	208 (−8)	400,000	60,000
Jun 28	Rochester International	New York	(United States) Patty Sheehan (27)	269 (−19)	400,000	60,000
Jul 5	Jamie Farr Toledo Classic	Ohio	(United States) Patty Sheehan (28)	209 (−4)	400,000	60,000
Jul 12	The Phar-Mor in Youngstown	Ohio	(United States) Betsy King (27)	209 (−7)	500,000	75,000
Jul 19	JAL Big Apple Classic	New York	(United States) Juli Inkster (15)	273 (−15)	500,000	75,000
Jul 26	**U.S. Women's Open**	Pennsylvania	(United States) **Patty Sheehan (29)**	280 (−4)	700,000	130,000
Aug 2	Welch's Classic	Massachusetts	(United States) Dottie Mochrie (5)	278 (−10)	425,000	63,750
Aug 9	McCall's LPGA Classic	Vermont	(Belgium) Florence Descampe (1)	278 (−6)	500,000	75,000
Aug 16	**du Maurier Ltd. Classic**	Canada	(United States) **Sherri Steinhauer (1)**	277 (−11)	700,000	105,000
Aug 23	Northgate Computer Classic	Minnesota	(United States) Kris Tschetter (1)	211 (−5)	425,000	63,750
Aug 30	Sun-Times Challenge	Illinois	(United States) Dottie Mochrie (6)	216 (E)	450,000	67,500
Sep 7	Rail Charity Golf Classic	Illinois	(United States) Nancy Lopez (45)	199 (−17)	450,000	67,500
Sep 13	Ping-Cellular One LPGA Golf Championship	Oregon	(United States) Nancy Lopez (46)	209 (−7)	450,000	67,500
Sep 20	Safeco Classic	Washington	(United States) Colleen Walker (7)	277 (−11)	450,000	67,500
Sep 27	Los Coyotes LPGA Classic	California	(United States) Nancy Scranton (2)	279 (−9)	500,000	75,000
Nov 8	Mazda Japan Classic	Japan	(United States) Betsy King (28)	205 (−11)	650,000	97,500

== Awards ==
Award	Winner	Country
Money winner	Dottie Mochrie	United States
Scoring leader (Vare Trophy)	Dottie Mochrie	United States
Player of the Year	Dottie Mochrie	United States
Rookie of the Year	Helen Alfredsson	Sweden
