= 1990 LPGA Tour =

Golf tour season

1990 LPGA Tour season
- Duration: January 19, 1990 – November 4, 1990
- Number of official events: 34
- Most wins: 7 (United States) Beth Daniel
- Money leader: (United States) Beth Daniel
- Player of the Year: (United States) Beth Daniel
- Vare Trophy: (United States) Beth Daniel
- Rookie of the Year: (Japan) Hiromi Kobayashi

The 1990 LPGA Tour was the 41st season since the LPGA Tour officially began in 1950. The season ran from January 19 to November 4. The season consisted of 34 official money events. Beth Daniel won the most tournaments, seven. She also led the money list with earnings of $863,578.

The Mazda LPGA Championship was the first tournament to offer a $1,000,000 purse and the first to have a winner's share of over $100,000. There were seven first-time winners in 1990: Jane Crafter, Cathy Gerring, Cathy Johnston, Kris Monaghan, Barb Mucha, Tina Purtzer, and Maggie Will.

The tournament results and award winners are listed below.

== Tournament results ==
The following table shows all the official money events for the 1990 season. "Date" is the ending date of the tournament. The numbers in parentheses after the winners' names are the number of wins they had on the tour up to and including that event. Majors are shown in bold.

Date	Tournament	Location	Winner	Score	Purse ($)	1st prize ($)
Jan 21	The Jamaica Classic	Jamaica	(United States) Patty Sheehan (21)	212 (−1)	500,000	75,000
Feb 4	Oldsmobile LPGA Classic	Florida	(United States) Pat Bradley (24)	281 (−7)	300,000	45,000
Feb 18	The Phar-Mor at Inverrary	Florida	(Australia) Jane Crafter (1)	209 (−7)	400,000	60,000
Feb 24	Orix Hawaiian Ladies Open	Hawaii	(United States) Beth Daniel (19)	210 (−6)	350,000	52,500
Mar 4	Women's Kemper Open	Hawaii	(United States) Beth Daniel (20)	283 (−1)	500,000	75,000
Mar 11	Desert Inn LPGA International	Nevada	(United States) Maggie Will (1)	214 (−2)	400,000	60,000
Mar 18	Circle K LPGA Tucson Open	Arizona	(United States) Colleen Walker (3)	276 (−12)	300,000	45,000
Mar 25	Standard Register Turquoise Classic	Arizona	(United States) Pat Bradley (25)	280 (−12)	500,000	75,000
Apr 1	**Nabisco Dinah Shore**	California	(United States) **Betsy King (21)**	283 (−5)	600,000	90,000
Apr 8	Red Robin Kyocera Inamori Classic	California	(United States) Kris Monaghan (1)	276 (−8)	300,000	45,000
May 6	Sara Lee Classic	Tennessee	(Japan) Ayako Okamoto (16)	210 (−6)	425,000	63,750
May 13	Crestar Classic	Virginia	(United States) Dottie Mochrie (2)	200 (−16)	350,000	52,500
May 20	Planters Pat Bradley International	North Carolina	(United States) Cindy Rarick (4)	25 points	400,000	60,000
May 27	LPGA Corning Classic	New York	(United States) Pat Bradley (26)	274 (−10)	350,000	52,500
Jun 3	Lady Keystone Open	Pennsylvania	(United States) Cathy Gerring (1)	208 (−8)	300,000	45,000
Jun 10	McDonald's Championship	Delaware	(United States) Patty Sheehan (22)	275 (−9)	650,000	97,500
Jun 17	Atlantic City Classic	New Jersey	(United States) Christa Johnson (5)	275 (−5)	300,000	45,000
Jun 24	Rochester International	New York	(United States) Patty Sheehan (23)	271 (−17)	400,000	60,000
Jul 1	**du Maurier Ltd. Classic**	Canada	(United States) **Cathy Johnston (1)**	276 (−16)	600,000	90,000
Jul 8	Jamie Farr Toledo Classic	Ohio	(Canada) Tina Purtzer (1)	205 (−8)	325,000	48,750
Jul 15	**U.S. Women's Open**	Georgia	(United States) **Betsy King (22)**	284 (−4)	500,000	85,000
Jul 22	The Phar-Mor in Youngstown	Ohio	(United States) Beth Daniel (21)	207 (−9)	400,000	60,000
Jul 29	**Mazda LPGA Championship**	Maryland	(United States) **Beth Daniel (22)**	280 (−4)	1,000,000	150,000
Aug 5	Boston Five Classic	Massachusetts	(United States) Barb Mucha (1)	277 (−11)	350,000	52,500
Aug 12	Stratton Mountain LPGA Classic	Vermont	(United States) Cathy Gerring (2)	281 (−7)	450,000	67,500
Aug 19	JAL Big Apple Classic	New York	(United States) Betsy King (23)	273 (−15)	400,000	60,000
Aug 26	Northgate Classic	Minnesota	(United States) Beth Daniel (23)	203 (−13)	375,000	56,250
Sep 3	Rail Charity Golf Classic	Illinois	(United States) Beth Daniel (24)	203 (−13)	300,000	45,000
Sep 9	Ping-Cellular One Golf Championship	Oregon	(United States) Patty Sheehan (24)	208 (−8)	350,000	52,500
Sep 16	Safeco Classic	Washington	(United States) Patty Sheehan (25)	270 (−18)	300,000	45,000
Sep 23	MBS LPGA Classic	California	(United States) Nancy Lopez (43)	281 (−7)	325,000	48,750
Oct 7	Centel Classic	Florida	(United States) Beth Daniel (25)	271 (−17)	1,000,000	150,000
Oct 14	Trophee Urban World Championship	France	(United States) Cathy Gerring (3)	278 (−10)	325,000	100,000
Nov 4	Mazda Japan Classic	Japan	(United States) Debbie Massey (3)	133 (−11)^	550,000	82,500

^ - weather-shortened tournament

== Awards ==
Award	Winner	Country
Money winner	Beth Daniel (3)	United States
Scoring leader (Vare Trophy)	Beth Daniel (2)	United States
Player of the Year	Beth Daniel (2)	United States
Rookie of the Year	Hiromi Kobayashi	Japan
