= 1989 U.S. Women's Open =

Coordinates: 42.787°N 83.268°W

Tournament information
- Dates: July 13–16, 1989
- Location: Lake Orion, Michigan
- Courses: Indianwood Golf and Country Club, Old Course
- Organized by: USGA
- Tour: LPGA Tour

Statistics
- Par: 71
- Length: 6,109 yards (5,586 m)
- Cut: 150 (+8)
- Prize fund: $450,000
- Winner's share: $80,000

Champion
- (United States) Betsy King
- 278 (−6)

Location in the United States
Location in Michigan

The 1989 U.S. Women's Open was the 44th U.S. Women's Open, held July 13–16 at the Old Course of Indianwood Golf and Country Club in Lake Orion, Michigan, north of Detroit.

Betsy King won the first of her two consecutive titles, four strokes ahead of runner-up Nancy Lopez. It was the second of King's six major titles. With the win, her fifth in 1989, she became the first in the history of the LPGA Tour to exceed $500,000 in earnings for a single season.

Ending the third round on Saturday, King lost four shots on the last four holes and fell into the 54-hole co-lead with Patty Sheehan. The Sunday gallery was the largest to date at the U.S. Women's Open, exceeding 25,000, and King birdied the first hole on the way to a 68. Sheehan, a future champion in 1992 and 1994, carded a disappointing 79 and finished tied for 17th.

The championship returned to Indianwood five years later, in 1994, won by Sheehan.

== Round summaries ==
=== First round ===
Thursday, July 13, 1989

Place	Player	Score	To par
1	(United States) Betsy King	67	−4
2	(France) M.L. de Lorenzi-Taya	68	−3
3	(United States) Jane Geddes	70	−2
T4	(United States) Kristi Albers	71	E
T4	(United States) Amy Benz	71	E
T4	(United States) Donna Cusano-Wilkins	71	E
T4	(United States) Lori Garbacz	71	E
T4	(United States) Linda Hunt	71	E
T4	(United States) Caroline Keggi	71	E
T4	(United States) Debbie Massey	71	E
T4	(Sweden) Liselotte Neumann	71	E
T4	(United States) Cathy Reynolds	71	E
T4	(United States) Angie Ridgeway	71	E
T4	(United States) Alice Ritzman	71	E
T4	(United States) Robin Watton	71	E

=== Second round ===
Friday, July 14, 1989

Place	Player	Score	To par
1	(United States) Betsy King	67-71=138	−4
T2	(United States) Lori Garbacz	71-70=141	−1
T2	(United States) Patty Sheehan	74-67=141	−1
T2	(United States) Colleen Walker	72-69=141	−1
T5	(United States) Jane Geddes	70-72=142	E
T5	(France) M.L. de Lorenzi-Taya	68-74=142	E
T5	(Sweden) Liselotte Neumann	71-71=142	E
T5	(United States) Dottie Pepper	72-70=142	E
T9	(United States) Danielle Ammaccapane	73-70=143	+1
T9	(United States) Donna Cusano-Wilkins	71-72=143	+1
T9	(United States) Tammie Green	77-67=143	+1
T9	(United States) Linda Hunt	71-72=143	+1
T9	(United States) Nancy Lopez	73-70=143	+1
T9	(United States) Debbie Massey	71-72=143	+1
T9	(United States) Kim Shipman	74-69=143	+1

=== Third round ===
Saturday, July 15, 1989

Place	Player	Score	To par
T1	(United States) Betsy King	67-71-72=210	−3
T1	(United States) Patty Sheehan	74-67-69=210	−3
3	(United States) Colleen Walker	72-69-71=212	−1
4	(France) M.L. de Lorenzi-Taya	68-74-71=213	E
T5	(United States) Donna Cusano-Wilkins	71-72-71=214	+1
T5	(United States) Lori Garbacz	71-70-73=214	+1
T5	(United States) Jane Geddes	70-72-72=214	+1
T5	(United States) Nancy Lopez	73-70-71=214	+1
T9	(United States) Myra Blackwelder	76-68-71=215	+2
T9	(United States) Pat Bradley	73-74-68=215	+2
T9	(United States) Vicki Fergon	72-74-69=215	+2
T9	(Spain) Marta Figueras-Dotti	75-70-70=215	+2

=== Final round ===
Sunday, July 16, 1989

Place	Player	Score	To par	Money ($)
1	(United States) Betsy King	67-71-72-68=278	−6	80,000
2	(United States) Nancy Lopez	73-70-71-68=282	−2	40,000
T3	(United States) Pat Bradley	73-74-68-68=283	−1	24,250
T3	(United States) Penny Hammel	74-73-69-67=283	−1	24,250
T5	(United States) Dottie Pepper	72-70-75-67=284	E	15,043
T5	(United States) Lori Garbacz	71-70-73-70=284	E	15,043
T7	(England) Laura Davies	73-71-75-66=285	+1	11,931
T7	(United States) Vicki Fergon	72-74-69-70=285	+1	11,931
T9	(United States) Colleen Walker	72-69-71-74=286	+2	9,974
T9	(United States) Jane Geddes	70-72-72-72=286	+2	9,974
