= 1997 LPGA Tour =

Golf tour season

1997 LPGA Tour season
- Duration: January 9, 1997 – November 23, 1997
- Number of official events: 38
- Most wins: 6 (Sweden) Annika Sörenstam
- Money leader: (Sweden) Annika Sörenstam
- Rolex Player of the Year: (Sweden) Annika Sörenstam
- Vare Trophy: (Australia) Karrie Webb
- Rookie of the Year: (England) Lisa Hackney

The 1997 LPGA Tour was the 48th season since the LPGA Tour officially began in 1950. The season ran from January 9 to November 23. The season consisted of 38 official money events. Annika Sörenstam won the most tournaments, six. She also led the money list with earnings of $1,236,789, setting the LPGA Tour record. Karrie Webb won the Vare Trophy for having the lowest scoring average. Her average of 70.00 was the lowest in the 45-year history of the award.

There were four first-time winners in 1997: Cindy Figg-Currier, Pat Hurst, Michele Redman, and Wendy Ward. Nancy Lopez won the last of her 48 LPGA career victories in 1997.

The tournament results and award winners are listed below.

== Tournament results ==
The following table shows all the official money events for the 1997 season. "Date" is the ending date of the tournament. The numbers in parentheses after the winners' names are the number of wins they had on the tour up to and including that event. Majors are shown in bold.

Date	Tournament	Location	Winner	Score	Purse ($)	1st prize ($)
Jan 12	Chrysler-Plymouth Tournament of Champions	Florida	(Sweden) Annika Sörenstam (7)	272 (−16)	700,000	115,000
Jan 19	HealthSouth Inaugural	Florida	(United States) Michelle McGann (6)	207 (−9)	600,000	90,000
Feb 9	Diet Dr Pepper National Pro-Am	Florida	(United States) Kelly Robbins (5)	271 (−17)	500,000	75,000
Feb 16	Los Angeles Women's Championship	California	(United States) Terry-Jo Myers (2)	206 (−10)	650,000	97,500
Feb 22	Cup Noodles Hawaiian Ladies Open	Hawaii	(Sweden) Annika Sörenstam (8)	206 (−10)	650,000	97,500
Mar 2	Alpine Australian Ladies Masters	Australia	(Canada) Gail Graham (2)	273 (−15)	650,000	97,500
Mar 16	Welch's/Circle K Championship	Arizona	(United States) Donna Andrews (5)	273 (−15)	500,000	75,000
Mar 23	Standard Register PING	Arizona	(England) Laura Davies (16)	277 (−15)	850,000	127,500
Mar 30	**Nabisco Dinah Shore**	California	(United States) **Betsy King (31)**	276 (−12)	900,000	135,000
Apr 6	Longs Drugs Challenge	California	(Sweden) Annika Sörenstam (9)	285 (−3)	500,000	75,000
Apr 20	Susan G. Komen International	South Carolina	(Australia) Karrie Webb (6)	276 (−12)	500,000	75,000
Apr 27	Chick-fil-A Charity Championship	Georgia	(United States) Nancy Lopez (48)	137 (−7)^	550,000	82,500
May 4	Sprint Titleholders Championship	Florida	(United States) Tammie Green (5)	274 (−14)	1,200,000	180,000
May 11	Sara Lee Classic	Tennessee	(United States) Terry-Jo Myers (3)	207 (−9)	675,000	101,250
May 18	**McDonald's LPGA Championship**	Delaware	(United States) **Christa Johnson (8)**	281 (−3)	1,200,000	180,000
May 25	LPGA Corning Classic	New York	(United States) Rosie Jones (8)	277 (−11)	650,000	97,500
Jun 1	Michelob Light Classic	Missouri	(Sweden) Annika Sörenstam (10)	277 (−11)	600,000	90,000
Jun 8	Oldsmobile Classic	Michigan	(United States) Pat Hurst (1)	279 (−9)	600,000	90,000
Jun 15	Edina Realty LPGA Classic	Minnesota	(United States) Danielle Ammaccapane (5)	208 (−8)	600,000	90,000
Jun 22	Rochester International	New York	(United States) Penny Hammel (4)	279 (−9)	600,000	90,000
Jun 29	ShopRite LPGA Classic	New Jersey	(United States) Michelle McGann (7)	201 (−12)	900,000	135,000
Jul 6	Jamie Farr Kroger Classic	Ohio	(United States) Kelly Robbins (6)	265 (−19)	700,000	105,000
Jul 13	**U.S. Women's Open**	Oregon	(England) **Alison Nicholas (3)**	274 (−10)	1,300,000	232,500
Jul 20	JAL Big Apple Classic	New York	(United States) Michele Redman (1)	272 (−12)	750,000	112,500
Jul 27	Giant Eagle LPGA Classic	Ohio	(United States) Tammie Green (6)	203 (−13)	600,000	90,000
Aug 1	**du Maurier Classic**	Canada	(United States) **Colleen Walker (8)**	278 (−14)	1,200,000	180,000
Aug 10	Friendly's Classic	Massachusetts	(United States) Deb Richard (5)	277 (−11)	550,000	82,500
Aug 17	Weetabix Women's British Open	England	(Australia) Karrie Webb (7)	269 (−19)	900,000	129,938
Aug 24	Star Bank LPGA Classic	Ohio	(United States) Colleen Walker (9)	203 (−13)	550,000	82,500
Sep 1	State Farm Rail Classic	Illinois	(United States) Cindy Figg-Currier (1)	200 (−16)	600,000	90,000
Sep 7	Safeway LPGA Golf Championship	Oregon	(United States) Christa Johnson (9)	206 (−10)	550,000	82,500
Sep 14	Safeco Classic	Washington	(Australia) Karrie Webb (8)	272 (−16)	550,000	82,500
Sep 21	Welch's Championship	Massachusetts	(Sweden) Liselotte Neumann (9)	276 (−12)	550,000	82,500
Sep 28	Fieldcrest Cannon Classic	North Carolina	(United States) Wendy Ward (1)	265 (−23)	550,000	82,500
Oct 5	CoreStates Betsy King Classic	Pennsylvania	(Sweden) Annika Sörenstam (11)	274 (−14)	600,000	90,000
Oct 19	Samsung World Championship of Women's Golf	South Korea	(United States) Juli Inkster (16)	280 (−8)	525,000	131,000
Nov 9	Toray Japan Queens Cup	Japan	(Sweden) Liselotte Neumann (10)	205 (−11)	750,000	112,500
Nov 23	ITT LPGA Tour Championship	Nevada	(Sweden) Annika Sörenstam (12)	277 (−11)	750,000	160,000

^ – weather-shortened tournament

== Awards ==
Award	Winner	Country
Money winner	Annika Sörenstam (2)	Sweden
Scoring leader (Vare Trophy)	Karrie Webb	Australia
Player of the Year	Annika Sörenstam (2)	Sweden
Rookie of the Year	Lisa Hackney	England
