= Heather Farr =

American professional golfer (1965–1993)

Personal information
- Nationality: United States
- Born: March 10, 1965 Phoenix, Arizona, U.S.
- Died: November 20, 1993 (aged 28) Scottsdale, Arizona, U.S.
- Height: 5 ft 1 in (155 cm)
- Spouses: Goran Lingmerth (m.1992–93, her death)

Career
- Sport: Golf
- College: Arizona State University
- Turned professional: 1985
- Former tour: LPGA Tour (1986–1990)

Best results in LPGA major championships
- Chevron Championship: T58: 1989
- Women's PGA C'ship: T45: 1988
- U.S. Women's Open: T11: 1983
- du Maurier Classic: T37: 1986

Achievements and awards
- LPGA William and Mousie Powell Award: 1989
- LPGA Heather Farr Award: 1994

Heather Farr (March 10, 1965 – November 20, 1993) was an American professional golfer. She plays on the LPGA Tour.

== Early life ==
In 1965, she was born and in Phoenix, Arizona. She was raised in the city. Farr was the elder of two daughters of Gerald D. (Jerry) and Sharon Farr. She and her sister Missy were introduced to golf by their father, a former rodeo cowboy and Air Force veteran, and the family spent countless hours together at the public Papago Golf Course in east Phoenix.

Farr won three state high school championships while at the all-girls Xavier College Preparatory. She is a member of the National High School Sports Hall of Fame and the azcentral.com Arizona High School Sports Hall of Fame. At a diminutive 5 ft 1 in (1.55 m), she was nicknamed "Mighty Mouse" during her teenage years.

== Amateur career ==
Farr graduated from high school a year early in 1982 and was a top recruit with many scholarship offers. She chose to stay close and enrolled at Arizona State University in adjacent Tempe, where she played for the Sun Devils women's golf team. At ASU she became a well-known golfer, both in Arizona and nationwide, winning the 1982 U.S. Girls' Junior and 1984 U.S. Women's Amateur Public Links.

At the U.S. Women's Open, Farr tied for eleventh and was low amateur as an 18-year-old at the 1983 U.S. Women's Open then tied for fortieth at the 1984 U.S. Women's Open. Farr played on the U.S. teams in the 1984 Curtis Cup and Espirito Santo Trophy. She was an All-American and was inducted into the ASU Sun Devils' Hall of Fame in 1990.

== Professional career ==
After three years at ASU, Farr turned pro in June 1985; she tied for eighth at the LPGA Tour's qualifying tournament near Houston in October to earn her tour card, and began play in early 1986.

Farr's best finish on tour was a tie for third at the Mazda Classic at Boca Raton, Florida in early 1988, and she had six top ten finishes that season.

With her pro career on the rise, Farr was diagnosed with breast cancer at age 24 in July 1989. Her battle with cancer became national news for the next four years. She played on tour on a limited basis in the fall of 1990, but more cancer was found in her spine and the base of her skull. In March 1991, Farr underwent a 13-hour operation to rebuild her vertebrae and stabilize her back with a 7-inch (18 cm) metal rod. That August, she began working on her putting stroke, with hopes to return to the tour. In 1992, she played six holes of a skins game at the Sara Lee Classic in April, but in May 1992 more cancer was found on her pelvis and skull.

== Death and legacy ==
Through 1993, The Arizona Republic newspaper of Phoenix kept a daily column which updated Farr's health condition. She became admired by many Arizonans because she kept hope of returning to the golf links soon, despite her ordeal. Beginning in August, she had numerous surgeries to relieve internal bleeding, and underwent surgery at Scottsdale Memorial Hospital-North on November 11 to relieve a brain hemorrhage; she died nine days later at age 28, surrounded by her family and many LPGA tour pros.

Farr was posthumously named an "ambassador" of the Grayhawk Golf Club in Arizona, and her family established the Heather Farr Foundation. In addition to that numerous golf awards have been named after her.

== Personal life ==
In March 1992, she married Goran Lingmerth.

Her younger sister Missy Farr-Kaye became the head coach of the women's golf team at Arizona State in June 2015, after many years as an assistant at their alma mater. Also diagnosed with breast cancer 28 years ago at age 30, she is a two-time cancer survivor (1998, 2008) and leads her sister's foundation.

Farr is buried at St. Francis Cemetery in Phoenix, beside her father Jerry (1939–2014).

== Awards and honors ==
- In 1989, Farr earned the William and Mousie Powell Award bestowed to the player who "whose behavior and deeds best exemplifies the spirit, ideals and values of the LPGA."
- In 1990, she was inducted into the Arizona State University's Sun Devils' Hall of Fame.
- In 1994, the LPGA established the Heather Farr Player Award to celebrate the life of Farr. The award "recognizes an LPGA Tour player who, through her hard work, dedication and love of the game of golf, has demonstrated determination, perseverance and spirit in fulfilling her goals as a player, qualities for which Farr is so fondly remembered." She earned the inaugural award, bestowed posthumously to her in 1994.
- She was inducted into the National High School Sports Hall of Fame posthumously.
- Farr was also inducted into the Arizona High School Sports Hall of Fame posthumously.

== Amateur wins ==
- 1980 Junior PGA Championship
- 1982 U.S. Girls' Junior, AJGA Tournament of Champions, Junior PGA Championship
- 1984 U.S. Women's Amateur Public Links

== U.S. national team appearances ==
Amateur

- Curtis Cup: 1984 (winners)
- Espirito Santo Trophy: 1984 (winners)
