= 1987 Nabisco Dinah Shore =

Golf tournament in California

Coordinates: 33.798°N 116.433°W

Tournament information
- Dates: April 2–5, 1987
- Location: Rancho Mirage, California
- Courses: Mission Hills Country Club (Dinah Shore Tourn. Course)
- Tour: LPGA Tour
- Format: Stroke play – 72 holes

Statistics
- Par: 72
- Length: 6,292 yards (5,753 m)
- Field: 67 after cut
- Cut: 154 (+10)
- Prize fund: $500,000
- Winner's share: $80,000

Champion
- (United States) Betsy King
- 283 (−5), playoff

Location in the United States
Location in California

The 1987 Nabisco Dinah Shore was a women's professional golf tournament, held April 2–5 at Mission Hills Country Club in Rancho Mirage, California. This was the 16th edition of the Nabisco Dinah Shore, and the fifth as a major championship.

Betsy King won the first of her six major titles in a sudden-death playoff over Patty Sheehan, with a par on the second extra hole. King entered the final round as co-leader at 215 (−1) with defending champion Pat Bradley, who finished a stroke back in solo third.

King won this event two more times, in 1990 and 1997.

== Final leaderboard ==
Sunday, April 5, 1987

| Place | Player | Score | To par | Money ($) |
|---|---|---|---|---|
| T1 | (United States) Betsy King | 68-75-72-68=283 | −5 | Playoff |
| T1 | (United States) Patty Sheehan | 77-73-68-65=283 | −5 | Playoff |
| 3 | (United States) Pat Bradley | 72-74-69-69=284 | −4 | 26,000 |
| 4 | (United States) Rosie Jones | 72-73-72-68=285 | −3 | 19,890 |
| T5 | (United States) Christa Johnson | 72-79-66-70=287 | −1 | 15,870 |
| T5 | (Japan) Ayako Okamoto | 71-76-71-69=287 | −1 | 15,870 |
| T5 | (United States) Colleen Walker | 72-74-73-68=287 | −1 | 15,870 |
| T8 | (United States) Jane Geddes | 73-77-67-71=288 | E | 11,850 |
| T8 | (United States) Cathy Gerring | 72-75-71-70=288 | E | 11,850 |
| 10 | (United States) Jody Rosenthal | 72-72-75-70=289 | +1 | 10,054 |

=== Playoff ===
On the first extra hole (#15), King hit her tee shot into the rough and then scrambled for par, while Sheehan missed a birdie putt. At #16, Sheehan again had a birdie opportunity, but three-putted from fifteen feet (4.5 m) while King sank a three-footer for par to win.

| Place | Player | Money ($) |
|---|---|---|
| 1 | (United States) Betsy King | 80,000 |
| 2 | (United States) Patty Sheehan | 42,000 |

==== Scorecard ====
| Hole | 15 | 16 |
|---|---|---|
| Par | 4 | 4 |
| (United States) King | 4 | 4 |
| (United States) Sheehan | 4 | 5 |

| Birdie | Bogey |
