= 1994 U.S. Women's Open =

Coordinates: 42.787°N 83.268°W

Tournament information
- Dates: July 21–24, 1994
- Location: Lake Orion, Michigan
- Courses: Indianwood Golf and Country Club, Old Course
- Organized by: USGA
- Tour: LPGA Tour

Statistics
- Par: 71
- Length: 6,244 yards (5,710 m)
- Cut: 147 (+6)
- Prize fund: $850,000
- Winner's share: $155,000

Champion
- (United States) Patty Sheehan
- 277 (−7)

Location in the United States
Location in Michigan

The 1994 U.S. Women's Open was the 49th U.S. Women's Open, held July 21–24 at the Old Course of Indianwood Golf and Country Club in Lake Orion, Michigan, north of Detroit. Patty Sheehan, the 1992 champion, won her second title in three years, one stroke ahead of runner-up Tammie Green, for the fifth of her six major titles. The event was televised by ESPN and ABC Sports.

Sheehan birdied the 16th hole and Green had a chance to force a Monday playoff, but her 12-foot (3.7 m) birdie putt on the 72nd hole did not fall.

Helen Alfredsson opened with 63 (−8) on the first day to better the single round record at the U.S. Women's Open by two strokes. She also set the record for the first 36 holes at 132 (−10), but carded 153 (+11) on the weekend. She had been as low as 13-under after 43 holes.

== Round summaries ==
=== First round ===
Thursday, July 21, 1994

Place	Player	Score	To par
1	(Sweden) Helen Alfredsson	63	−8
T2	(United States) Judy Dickinson	66	−5
T2	(United States) Tammie Green	66	−5
T2	(United States) Patty Sheehan	66	−5
T2	(United States) Carol Thompson (a)	66	−5
T6	(United States) Donna Andrews	67	−4
T6	(United States) Dale Eggeling	67	−4
T6	(South Africa) Sally Little	67	−4
T9	(England) Laura Davies	68	−3
T9	(United States) Amy Read	68	−3
T9	(United States) Deb Richard	68	−3
T9	(United States) Sherri Steinhauer	68	−3

=== Second round ===
Friday, July 22, 1994

Place	Player	Score	To par
1	(Sweden) Helen Alfredsson	63-69=132	−10
2	(England) Laura Davies	68-68=136	−6
T3	(Peru) Alicia Dibos	69-68=137	−5
T3	(United States) Michelle Estill	69-68=137	−5
T3	(United States) Patty Sheehan	66-71=137	−5
T6	(United States) Amy Alcott	71-67=138	−4
T6	(United States) Tammie Green	66-72=138	−4
T8	(United States) Donna Andrews	67-72=139	−3
T8	(United States) Judy Dickinson	66-73=139	−3
T8	(Scotland) Pamela Wright	74-65=139	−3

=== Third round ===
Saturday, July 23, 1994

Place	Player	Score	To par
1	(United States) Patty Sheehan	66-71-69=206	−7
2	(United States) Tammie Green	66-72-69=207	−6
3	(Sweden) Helen Alfredsson	63-69-76=208	−5
4	(United States) Donna Andrews	67-72-70=209	−4
T5	(Peru) Alicia Dibos	69-68-73=210	−3
T5	(Scotland) Pamela Wright	74-65-71=210	−3
T7	(United States) Pat Bradley	72-69-70=211	−2
T7	(England) Laura Davies	68-68-75=211	−2
T9	(United States) Judy Dickinson	66-73-73=212	−1
T9	(United States) Michelle Estill	69-68-75=212	−1
T9	(United States) Betsy King	69-71-72=212	−1
T9	(Sweden) Liselotte Neumann	69-72-71=212	−1

=== Final round ===
Sunday, July 24, 1994

Place	Player	Score	To par	Money ($)
1	(United States) Patty Sheehan	66-71-69-71=277	−7	155,000
2	(United States) Tammie Green	66-72-69-71=278	−6	85,000
3	(Sweden) Liselotte Neumann	69-72-71-69=281	−3	47,752
T4	(Spain) Tania Abitbol	72-68-73-70=283	−1	31,133
T4	(Peru) Alicia Dibos	69-68-73-73=283	−1	31,133
T6	(United States) Amy Alcott	71-67-77-69=284	E	21,487
T6	(United States) Betsy King	69-71-72-72=284	E	21,487
T6	(United States) Meg Mallon	70-72-73-69=284	E	21,487
T9	(Sweden) Helen Alfredsson	63-69-76-77=285	+1	16,446
T9	(United States) Donna Andrews	67-72-70-76=285	+1	16,446
T9	(United States) Kelly Robbins	71-72-70-72=285	+1	16,446
