= 1988 U.S. Women's Open =

Coordinates: 39.442°N 76.663°W

Tournament information
- Dates: July 21–24, 1988
- Location: Lutherville, Maryland
- Courses: Baltimore Country Club; Five Farms East Course
- Organized by: USGA
- Tour: LPGA Tour

Statistics
- Par: 71
- Length: 6,232 yards (5,699 m)
- Field: 152 players, 66 after cut
- Cut: 150 (+8)
- Prize fund: $400,000
- Winner's share: $70,000

Champion
- (Sweden) Liselotte Neumann
- 277 (−7)

Location in the United States
Location in Maryland

The 1988 U.S. Women's Open was the 43rd U.S. Women's Open, held July 21–24 at the Five Farms East Course of Baltimore Country Club in Lutherville, Maryland, a suburb north of Baltimore.

Liselotte Neumann won her only major title, three strokes ahead of runner-up Patty Sheehan. From Sweden, she was only the fifth international player to win the U.S. Women's Open. For the first time, the championship was won by non-Americans in consecutive years, as Laura Davies of England won in 1987.

At age 22, Neumann was the youngest professional to date to win the title, second by two months to 1967 champion Catherine Lacoste, an amateur who won less than a week after turning 22. She opened with a record 67 on Thursday, and either led or co-led after every round.

Sixty years earlier, the East Course hosted the PGA Championship in 1928, won by Leo Diegel. He stopped four-time defending champion Walter Hagen in the quarterfinals, ending his winning streak at 22 matches.

== Round summaries ==
=== First round ===
Thursday, July 21, 1988

Place	Player	Score	To par
1	(Sweden) Liselotte Neumann	67	−4
T2	(United States) JoAnne Carner	69	−2
T2	(United States) Sally Quinlan	69	−2
T4	(United States) Amy Benz	70	−1
T4	(United States) Vicki Fergon	70	−1
T4	(United States) Shirley Furlong	70	−1
T4	(United States) Dottie Pepper	70	−1
T4	(United States) Patty Sheehan	70	−1
T4	(United States) Colleen Walker	70	−1
T10	(United States) Marlene Brodzik Davis	71	E
T10	(United States) Nancy Brown	71	E
T10	(United States) Judy Dickinson	71	E
T10	(United States) Tammie Green	71	E
T10	(United States) Juli Inkster	71	E
T10	(South Africa) Sally Little	71	E

=== Second round ===
Friday, July 22, 1988

Place	Player	Score	To par
T1	(United States) Juli Inkster	71-68=139	−3
T1	(Sweden) Liselotte Neumann	67-72=139	−3
T1	(United States) Dottie Pepper	70-69=139	−3
T4	(United States) Vicki Fergon	70-71=141	−1
T4	(United States) Tammie Green	71-70=141	−1
T6	(United States) Amy Benz	70-72=142	E
T6	(United States) JoAnne Carner	69-73=142	E
T6	(United States) Patty Sheehan	70-72=142	E
T6	(United States) Donna White	72-70=142	E
T10	(United States) Kristi Albers	73-70=143	+1
T10	(United States) Kay Cockerill	73-70=143	+1
T10	(United States) Janet Coles	72-71=143	+1

=== Third round ===
Saturday, July 23, 1988

Place	Player	Score	To par
1	(Sweden) Liselotte Neumann	67-72-69=208	−5
2	(United States) Patty Sheehan	70-72-68=210	−3
T3	(United States) Tammie Green	71-70-71=212	−1
T3	(United States) Colleen Walker	70-74-68=212	−1
5	(United States) Amy Benz	70-72-71=213	E
T6	(United States) Missie Berteotti	75-71-68=214	+1
T6	(United States) Beth Daniel	77-71-66=214	+1
T6	(United States) Juli Inkster	71-68-75=214	+1
T9	(United States) Kristi Albers	73-70-72=215	+2
T9	(United States) Kay Cockerill	73-70-72=215	+2
T9	(United States) Dottie Pepper	70-69-76=215	+2
T9	(Australia) Jan Stephenson	72-72-71=215	+2
T9	(United States) Donna White	72-70-73=215	+2

=== Final round ===
Sunday, July 24, 1988

Place	Player	Score	To par	Money ($)
1	(Sweden) Liselotte Neumann	67-72-69-69=277	−7	70,000
2	(United States) Patty Sheehan	70-72-68-70=280	−4	35,000
T3	(United States) Dottie Pepper	70-69-76-68=283	−1	21,679
T3	(United States) Colleen Walker	70-74-68-71=283	−1	21,679
5	(Australia) Jan Stephenson	72-72-71-69=284	E	14,393
T6	(United States) Amy Benz	70-72-71-72=285	+1	11,826
T6	(United States) Missie Berteotti	75-71-68-71=285	+1	11,826
T8	(United States) Kristi Albers	73-70-72-71=286	+2	9,726
T8	(United States) Juli Inkster	71-68-75-72=286	+2	9,726
T10	(United States) Beth Daniel	77-71-66-73=287	+3	8,315
T10	(United States) Vicki Fergon	70-71-75-71=287	+3	8,315
