= Laurel Kean =

American professional golfer (born 1963)

Personal information
- Nationality: United States
- Born: June 14, 1963 (age 63) Portland, Maine, U.S.
- Height: 5 ft 6 in (1.68 m)

Career
- Sport: Golf
- College: University of South Florida
- Turned professional: 1987
- Former tours: LPGA Tour (1988–2005); Futures Tour (1987, 1995–96, 2000)
- Professional wins: 11

Number of wins by tour
- LPGA Tour: 1
- Epson Tour: 10

Best results in LPGA major championships
- Chevron Championship: T23: 1991
- Women's PGA C'ship: T18: 1988
- U.S. Women's Open: 4th: 1991
- du Maurier Classic: T23: 1990
- Women's British Open: CUT: 2001

Achievements and awards
- Futures Tour Player of the Year: 1987

Laurel Kean (born June 14, 1963) is an American professional golfer who played on the LPGA Tour.

Kean was born in Portland, Maine. She played college golf at University of South Florida where she was an All-American in 1986.

Kean turned professional in 1987 and played on the Futures Tour. She won nine events in 1987, setting the single season record, and was named Player of the Year.

Kean had her lone LPGA Tour win in 2000, the first by a Monday qualifier.

After retiring from active competition in 2006, Kean became a teaching pro at La Playa Golf Club in Naples, Florida.

== Professional wins (11) ==
=== LPGA Tour wins (1) ===
No.	Date	Tournament	Winning score	Margin of victory	Runners-up
1	Sep 3, 2000	State Farm Rail Classic	–18 (66-66-66=198)	6 strokes	(United States) Dina Ammaccapane (South Korea) Mi-Hyun Kim

LPGA Tour playoff record (0–1)

No.	Year	Tournament	Opponents	Result
1	1997	Sara Lee Classic	(Canada) Nancy Harvey (United States) Terry-Jo Myers	Myers won with par on fifth extra hole Harvey eliminated by birdie on first hole

=== Futures Tour wins (10) ===
- 1987 (9) Lake City Classic, Christa McAuliffe Classic, Fort Leavenworth Classic, Western Slope Ford Classic, Sierra Sage Classic, Quail Ranch Classic, Bacon Park Classic, Golf Hammock Classic, Marsh Landing Classic
- 1996 (1) Golden Flake/Golden Ocala Futures Classic
