= 1990 Nabisco Dinah Shore =

Coordinates: 33.798°N 116.433°W

Tournament information
- Dates: March 29 – April 1, 1990
- Location: Rancho Mirage, California
- Courses: Mission Hills Country Club; Old Course (Dinah Shore Tourn. Course)
- Tour: LPGA Tour
- Format: Stroke play – 72 holes

Statistics
- Par: 72
- Length: 6,441 yards (5,890 m)
- Field: 115 players, 74 after cut
- Cut: 151 (+7)
- Prize fund: $600,000
- Winner's share: $90,000

Champion
- (United States) Betsy King
- 283 (−5)

Location in the United States
Location in California

The 1990 Nabisco Dinah Shore was a women's professional golf tournament, held from March 29 to April 1 at Mission Hills Country Club in Rancho Mirage, California. This was the 19th edition of the Nabisco Dinah Shore, and the eighth as a major championship.

Betsy King won the second of her three Dinah Shores, two strokes ahead of runners-up Shirley Furlong and Kathy Postlewait. She began the final round with a five-shot lead, then carded a 75 (+3), with four bogeys on the last seven holes. It was the third of King's six major titles; she was the reigning U.S. Women's Open champion and repeated in July.

== Final leaderboard ==
Sunday, April 1, 1990

Place	Player	Score	To par	Money ($)
1	(United States) Betsy King	69-70-69-75=283	−5	90,000
T2	(United States) Shirley Furlong	74-73-70-68=285	−3	42,000
T2	(United States) Kathy Postlewait	73-72-68-72=285	−3	42,000
4	(United States) Cindy Rarick	72-72-72-70=286	−2	28,000
5	(United States) Colleen Walker	74-72-67-74=287	−1	24,000
T6	(United States) Beth Daniel	71-73-72-72=288	E	17,217
T6	(United States) Rosie Jones	72-71-71-74=288	E	17,217
T6	(Japan) Ayako Okamoto	73-72-72-71=288	E	17,217
T9	(United States) Pat Bradley	74-73-69-73=289	+1	12,699
T9	(United States) Meg Mallon	74-72-70-73=289	+1	12,699
