= Danielle Ammaccapane =

American professional golfer (born 1965)

Personal information
- Nationality: United States
- Born: November 27, 1965 (age 60) Babylon, New York, U.S.
- Height: 5 ft 5 in (1.65 m)

Career
- Sport: Golf
- College: Arizona State University
- Turned professional: 1988
- Former tour: LPGA Tour
- Professional wins: 7

Number of wins by tour
- LPGA Tour: 7

Best results in LPGA major championships
- Chevron Championship: T11: 1989, 1991
- Women's PGA C'ship: T14: 1990
- U.S. Women's Open: T3: 1990
- du Maurier Classic: T9: 1995
- Women's British Open: T25: 2001

Danielle Ammaccapane (born November 27, 1965) is an American professional golfer who played on the LPGA Tour.

== Career ==
Ammaccapane was born in 1965 in Babylon, New York. She had a successful junior and amateur career and won the U.S. Women's Amateur Public Links in 1985.

She played her collegiate golf at Arizona State University becoming NCAA National Champion in 1985, She was All-American First team in 1985 and 1986 and All-American Second team in 1987. She was also All-Conference First team from 1984–1987 and won the Pac-10 championship in 1987.

She represented the United States in the 1986 Curtis Cup.

She won seven times on the LPGA Tour.

== Personal life ==
Her daughter, with husband Rod Kesling, is child actor Laura Ann Kesling.

== Awards and honors ==
In 1997, Ammaccapane was inducted into Arizona State University's Athletic Hall of Fame.

== Professional wins (9) ==
=== LPGA Tour wins (7) ===
No.	Date	Tournament	Winning score	Margin of victory	Runner(s)-up
1	Mar 24, 1991	Standard Register PING	−9 (74-70-70-69=283)	2 strokes	(Canada) Barb Bunkowsky-Scherbak (United States) Meg Mallon
2	Mar 22, 1992	Standard Register PING	−13 (72-69-69-69=279)	2 strokes	(United States) Kristi Albers
3	May 3, 1992	Centel Classic	−12 (69-68-69-69=275)	1 stroke	(United States) Michelle Estill (Sweden) Liselotte Neumann (United States) Colleen Walker
4	Jun 21, 1992	Lady Keystone Open	−8 (68-71-69=208)	2 strokes	(United States) Nancy Lopez (United States) Muffin Spencer-Devlin (United States) Lori West
5	Jun 15, 1997	Edina Realty LPGA Classic	−8 (70-70-68=208)	1 stroke	(United States) Jane Geddes (Japan) Mayumi Hirase (Japan) Hiromi Kobayashi (Scotland) Catriona Matthew
6	May 3 1998	Mercury Titleholders Championship	−12 (70-68-67-71=276)	1 stroke	(United States) Michelle Estill
7	Sep 6, 1998	Safeway LPGA Golf Championship	−12 (65-67-72=204)	1 stroke	(United States) Emilee Klein

=== Other wins (2) ===
- 1991 Nichirei International
- 1992 Nichirei International

== Team appearances ==
Amateur

- Curtis Cup (representing the United States): 1986

Professional

- Solheim Cup (representing the United States): 1992
- Handa Cup (representing the United States): 2015 (winners)
