= 1988 LPGA Tour =

Golf tour season

1988 LPGA Tour season
- Duration: February 4, 1988 – November 6, 1988
- Number of official events: 34
- Most wins: 3 (United States) Juli Inkster, (United States) Rosie Jones, (United States) Betsy King, (United States) Nancy Lopez, (Japan) Ayako Okamoto
- Money leader: (United States) Sherri Turner
- Player of the Year: (United States) Nancy Lopez
- Vare Trophy: (United States) Colleen Walker
- Rookie of the Year: (Sweden) Liselotte Neumann

The 1988 LPGA Tour was the 39th season since the LPGA Tour officially began in 1950. The season ran from February 4 to November 6. The season consisted of 34 official money events. Juli Inkster, Rosie Jones, Betsy King, Nancy Lopez, and Ayako Okamoto won the most tournaments, three each. Sherri Turner led the money list with earnings of $350,851.

There were eight first-time winners in 1988: Mei-Chi Cheng, Shirley Furlong, Patty Jordan, Ok-Hee Ku, Terry-Jo Myers, Martha Nause, Liselotte Neumann, and Sherri Turner. Ku was the first South Korean winner, winning the Standard Register Turquoise Classic.

The tournament results and award winners are listed below.

== Tournament results ==
The following table shows all the official money events for the 1988 season. "Date" is the ending date of the tournament. The numbers in parentheses after the winners' names are the number of wins they had on the tour up to and including that event. Majors are shown in bold.

| Date | Tournament | Location | Winner | Score | Purse ($) | 1st prize ($) |
|---|---|---|---|---|---|---|
| Feb 7 | Mazda Classic | Florida | (United States) Nancy Lopez (37) | 283 (−5) | 200,000 | 30,000 |
| Feb 14 | Sarasota Classic | Florida | (United States) Patty Sheehan (18) | 282 (−6) | 225,000 | 33,750 |
| Feb 27 | Orient Leasing Hawaiian Ladies Open | Hawaii | (Japan) Ayako Okamoto (12) | 213 (−3) | 300,000 | 45,000 |
| Mar 6 | Women's Kemper Open | Hawaii | (United States) Betsy King (12) | 280 (−8) | 300,000 | 45,000 |
| Mar 20 | Circle K LPGA Tucson Open | Arizona | (England) Laura Davies (2) | 278 (−10) | 300,000 | 45,000 |
| Mar 27 | Standard Register Turquoise Classic | Arizona | (South Korea) Ok-Hee Ku (1) | 281 (−7) | 350,000 | 52,500 |
| Apr 3 | **Nabisco Dinah Shore** | California | (United States) **Amy Alcott (27)** | 274 (−14) | 500,000 | 80,000 |
| Apr 10 | San Diego Inamori Golf Classic | California | (Japan) Ayako Okamoto (13) | 272 (−12) | 225,000 | 33,750 |
| Apr 17 | AI Star/Centinela Hospital Classic | California | (United States) Nancy Lopez (38) | 210 (−6) | 400,000 | 60,000 |
| Apr 24 | USX Golf Classic | Florida | (United States) Rosie Jones (2) | 275 (−13) | 225,000 | 33,750 |
| May 1 | Sara Lee Classic | Tennessee | (United States) Patti Rizzo (3) | 207 (−9) | 335,000 | 50,250 |
| May 8 | Crestar Classic | Virginia | (United States) Juli Inkster (9) | 209 (−7) | 300,000 | 45,000 |
| May 15 | Chrysler-Plymouth Classic | New Jersey | (United States) Nancy Lopez (39) | 204 (−12) | 250,000 | 37,500 |
| May 22 | **Mazda LPGA Championship** | Ohio | (United States) **Sherri Turner (1)** | 281 (−7) | 350,000 | 52,500 |
| May 29 | LPGA Corning Classic | New York | (United States) Sherri Turner (2) | 273 (−15) | 325,000 | 48,750 |
| Jun 5 | Jamie Farr Toledo Classic | Ohio | (England) Laura Davies (3) | 277 (−11) | 275,000 | 41,250 |
| Jun 12 | Rochester International | New York | (Taiwan) Mei-Chi Cheng (1) | 287 (−1) | 300,000 | 45,000 |
| Jun 19 | Lady Keystone Open | Pennsylvania | (United States) Shirley Furlong (1) | 205 (−11) | 300,000 | 45,000 |
| Jun 26 | McDonald's Championship | Delaware | (United States) Kathy Postlewait (3) | 276 (−8) | 500,000 | 75,000 |
| Jul 3 | **du Maurier Ltd. Classic** | Canada | (South Africa) (United States) **Sally Little (15)** | 279 (−9) | 500,000 | 75,000 |
| Jul 10 | Mayflower Classic | Indiana | (United States) Terry-Jo Myers (1) | 276 (−8) | 400,000 | 60,000 |
| Jul 17 | Boston Five Classic | Massachusetts | (United States) Colleen Walker (2) | 274 (−14) | 300,000 | 45,000 |
| Jul 24 | **U.S. Women's Open** | Maryland | (Sweden) **Liselotte Neumann (1)** | 277 (−7) | 400,000 | 70,000 |
| Jul 31 | Greater Washington Open | Maryland | (Japan) Ayako Okamoto (14) | 206 (−7) | 225,000 | 33,750 |
| Aug 7 | Planters Pat Bradley International | North Carolina | (United States) Martha Nause (1) | 14 points | 400,000 | 62,500 |
| Aug 21 | Atlantic City Classic | New Jersey | (United States) Juli Inkster (10) | 206 (−7) | 225,000 | 33,750 |
| Aug 28 | Nestle World Championship | Georgia | (United States) Rosie Jones (3) | 279 (−9) | 250,000 | 81,500 |
| Aug 28 | Ocean State Open | Rhode Island | (United States) Patty Jordan (1) | 211 (−5) | 150,000 | 22,500 |
| Sep 5 | Rail Charity Golf Classic | Illinois | (United States) Betsy King (13) | 207 (−9) | 250,000 | 33,750 |
| Sep 11 | Cellular One-Ping Golf Championship | Oregon | (United States) Betsy King (14) | 213 (−3) | 250,000 | 37,500 |
| Sep 18 | Safeco Classic | Washington | (United States) Juli Inkster (11) | 278 (−10) | 225,000 | 33,750 |
| Sep 26 | Santa Barbara Open | California | (United States) Rosie Jones (4) | 212 (−4) | 300,000 | 45,000 |
| Oct 2 | Konica San Jose Classic | California | (United States) Kathy Guadagnino (2) | 207 (−9) | 300,000 | 45,000 |
| Nov 6 | Mazda Japan Classic | Japan | (United States) Patty Sheehan (19) | 206 (−10) | 450,000 | 67,500 |

== Awards ==
| Award | Winner | Country |
|---|---|---|
| Money winner | Sherri Turner | United States |
| Scoring leader (Vare Trophy) | Colleen Walker | United States |
| Player of the Year | Nancy Lopez (4) | United States |
| Rookie of the Year | Liselotte Neumann | Sweden |
