= Elaine Crosby =

American professional golfer (born 1958)

Personal information
- Nationality: United States
- Born: June 6, 1958 (age 68) Birmingham, Michigan, U.S.
- Height: 5 ft 8.5 in (1.74 m)

Career
- Sport: Golf
- College: University of Michigan
- Status: Professional
- Current tour: Legends Tour
- Former tours: LPGA Tour; Futures Tour
- Professional wins: 4

Number of wins by tour
- LPGA Tour: 2
- Epson Tour: 1
- Other: 1

Best results in LPGA major championships
- Chevron Championship: T11: 1990
- Women's PGA C'ship: T3: 1994
- U.S. Women's Open: T6: 1990
- du Maurier Classic: T16: 1987

Elaine Crosby (born June 6, 1958) is an American professional golfer who played on the LPGA Tour.

== Career ==
Crosby won twice on the LPGA Tour in 1989 and 1994.

Crosby founded the website "FINDaLESSON.com".

== Awards and honors ==
In 1996, Crosby was elected to the University of Michigan Athletic Hall of Honor.

== Amateur wins ==
- 1980 Bowling Green Invitational Championship
- 1981 Michigan Womens Amateur Championship

== Professional wins (4) ==
=== LPGA Tour wins (2) ===
No.	Date	Tournament	Winning score	Margin of victory	Runner-up
1	Nov 5, 1989	Mazda Japan Classic	–11 (71-64-70=205)	3 strokes	(Canada) Dawn Coe
2	May 22, 1994	Lady Keystone Open	–5 (69-72-70=211)	1 stroke	(England) Laura Davies

=== Futures Tour wins (1) ===
- 1984 Bacon Park Charity Classic

=== Legends Tour wins (1) ===
- 2004 HyVee Classic
