= 1987 du Maurier Classic =

Coordinates: 45.526915°N 73.844461°W

The 1987 du Maurier Classic was contested from July 9–12 at Islesmere Golf Club in Laval, Quebec. It was the edition 15th of the du Maurier Classic, and the ninth edition as a major championship on the LPGA Tour.

This event was won by Jody Rosenthal.

== Final leaderboard ==
| Place | Player | Score | To par | Money (US$) |
|---|---|---|---|---|
| 1 | (United States) Jody Rosenthal | 68-70-68-66=272 | −16 | 60,000 |
| 2 | (Japan) Ayako Okamoto | 65-69-66-74=274 | −14 | 37,000 |
| 3 | (United States) Rosie Jones | 71-67-69-69=276 | −12 | 27,000 |
| T4 | (United States) Shirley Furlong | 66-72-70-70=278 | −10 | 19,000 |
| T4 | (United States) Barb Scherbak | 70-72-66-70=278 | −10 | 19,000 |
| 6 | (United States) Kathy Postlewait | 69-68-72-70=279 | −9 | 14,000 |
| 7 | (United States) Betsy King | 74-71-67-68=280 | −8 | 11,800 |
| T8 | (United States) Jane Geddes | 71-70-71-70=282 | −6 | 9,400 |
| T8 | (United States) Dot Germain | 70-68-72-72=282 | −6 | 9,400 |
| T8 | (United States) Penny Hammel | 68-70-72-72=282 | −6 | 9,400 |
