= Dawn Coe-Jones =

Canadian professional golfer (1960–2016)

Personal information
- Nationality: Canada
- Born: October 19, 1960 Campbell River, British Columbia, Canada
- Died: November 12, 2016 (aged 56) Tampa, Florida, U.S.
- Height: 5 ft 7 in (170 cm)
- Spouse: Jimmy Jones
- Children: 1

Career
- Sport: Golf
- College: Lamar University
- Turned professional: 1983
- Former tours: LPGA Tour (1984–2008); Legends Tour
- Professional wins: 4

Number of wins by tour
- LPGA Tour: 3
- Other: 1

Best results in LPGA major championships
- Chevron Championship: T5: 1993
- Women's PGA C'ship: 3rd: 1990
- U.S. Women's Open: 5th: 1992
- du Maurier Classic: 3rd: 1993
- Women's British Open: DNP

Dawn Coe-Jones (October 19, 1960 – November 12, 2016) was a Canadian professional golfer. She played on the LPGA Tour originally under the name Dawn Coe. She is a member of the Canadian Golf Hall of Fame. She was the first female Canadian golfer to surpass US $1 million dollars in career earnings prefiguring the rise of Canadian female golfers on the world stage in the 1990s.

== Early life and amateur career ==
Coe-Jones was born in Campbell River, British Columbia. Growing up in Lake Cowichan on Vancouver Island and she as a teenager at March Meadows Golf Course in Honeymoon Bay.

She had an outstanding amateur career, scoring back-to-back wins in the British Columbia Junior tournament in 1978 and 1979 and the British Columbia Amateur in 1982 and 1983. She capped her 1983 season with the Canadian Women's Amateur title and won NCAA All-American honours at Lamar University. She won a scholarship in her sophomore year and graduated in 1983 with a degree in elementary education.

== Professional career ==
In 1983, Coe-Jones turned pro. Her first LPGA Tour win came at the Women's Kemper Open in 1992. Coe-Jones was accompanied by caddie and childhood friend Kelly Feltrin, who was on her bag when she won the Kemper. She went on to claim the 1994 HealthSouth Palm Beach Classic and 1995 Chrysler-Plymouth Tournament of Champions. Her best score ever was 63 at the Safeco Classic in 1998. In 1993, she became the first female golfer to sink an albatross in a women's major.

Coe-Jones played on the LPGA Tour from 1984 to 2008, winning three tournaments and over $3 million in career earnings. She competed in over 20 Canadian Women's Opens. Her best chance to win her national open was in 1993, when she was third behind Brandie Burton and Betsy King at London Hunt. She tied for fourth with Canadian Gail Graham in 1998 in Windsor, Ontario.

Coe-Jones made her farewell appearance at the CN Canadian Women's Open in 2008, finishing 14-over after two rounds and missing the cut.

== Personal life ==
She competed under her maiden name, Dawn Coe, until her marriage to Jimmy Jones in November 1992. She moved to Tampa from Texas in 1992 to be near the man she would marry that year, Jimmy Jones, and friends from the tour. Their son James was born three years later.

Coe-Jones' favourite hockey team growing up was the Montreal Canadiens but after living in Florida for many years she adopted the Tampa Bay Lightning. She was present for their 2004 Stanley Cup victory.

== Death and legacy ==
She died of chondrosarcoma, a form of bone cancer at a hospice on November 12, 2016, near her home in Tampa, Florida, aged 56.

She is survived by her husband, Jimmy, son, Jimmy, in-laws Sandy and General James Jones, and brothers Mark and John Coe. Her son is a college golfer at the University of South Florida and winner of the 2015 Florida State Amateur.

The inaugural Dawn Coe-Jones Golf Classic was held in October 2016 to raise funds for Sarcoma research in her name.

== Award and honours ==
- In 2003, Coe-Jones was inducted into the Canadian Golf Hall of Fame.
- In 2013, she was inducted into the B.C. Sports Hall of Fame.

== Amateur wins ==
- 1978 British Columbia Junior
- 1979 British Columbia Junior
- 1982 British Columbia Amateur
- 1983 British Columbia Amateur, Canadian Women's Amateur

== Professional wins (4) ==
=== LPGA Tour wins (3) ===
No.	Date	Tournament	Winning score	Margin of victory	Runner-up
1	Feb, 29 1992	Women's Kemper Open	−13 (68-70-69-68=275)	1 stroke	(United States) Dottie Mochrie
2	Feb 6, 1994	HealthSouth Palm Beach Classic	−15 (67-69-65=201)	1 stroke	(United States) Lauri Merten
3	Jan 15, 1995	Chrysler-Plymouth Tournament of Champions	−7 (74-70-68-69=281)	6 strokes	(United States) Beth Daniel

LPGA Tour playoff record (0–1)

No.	Year	Tournament	Opponent	Result
1	1992	Oldsmobile LPGA Classic	(United States) Colleen Walker	Lost to par on first extra hole

=== Other wins (1) ===
- 1992 Pizza-La LPGA Matchplay Championship

== Team appearances ==
Professional

- World Cup (representing Canada): 2005
- Handa Cup (representing World team): 2006, 2007, 2008, 2009, 2010, 2011, 2012 (tie), 2014
