= 1990 U.S. Women's Open =

Coordinates: 34.005°N 84.192°W

Tournament information
- Dates: July 12–15, 1990
- Location: Johns Creek, Georgia
- Courses: Atlanta Athletic Club, Riverside Course
- Organized by: USGA
- Tour: LPGA Tour

Statistics
- Par: 72
- Length: 6,298 yards (5,759 m)
- Field: 156 players, 63 after cut
- Cut: 149 (+5)
- Prize fund: $500,000
- Winner's share: $85,000

Champion
- (United States) Betsy King
- 284 (−4)

Location in the United States
Location in Georgia

The 1990 U.S. Women's Open was the 45th U.S. Women's Open, held July 12–15 at the Riverside Course of Atlanta Athletic Club in Johns Creek, Georgia, a suburb northeast of Atlanta.

Defending champion Betsy King became the fifth of seven to win consecutive titles, one stroke ahead of runner-up Patty Sheehan, the leader after each of the first three rounds. Rains delayed the completion of each of the first two rounds until the following day; the final two rounds were played on Sunday.

== Round summaries ==
=== First round ===
Thursday, July 12, 1990
Friday, July 13, 1990

Place	Player	Score	To par
T1	(United States) Jane Geddes	66	−6
T1	(United States) Patty Sheehan	66	−6
3	(United States) Caroline Keggi	67	−5
4	(United States) Nancy Lopez	68	−4
T5	(United States) Jerilyn Britz	69	−3
T5	(United States) Colleen Walker	69	−3
T7	(United States) Janet Anderson	70	−2
T7	(United States) Cathy Gerring	70	−2
T7	(United States) Tammie Green	70	−2
T7	(United States) Debbie Massey	70	−2
T7	(United States) Mary Murphy	70	−2
T7	(United States) Susan Sanders	70	−2

=== Second round ===
Friday, July 13, 1990
Saturday, July 14, 1990

Place	Player	Score	To par
1	(United States) Patty Sheehan	66-68=134	−10
2	(United States) Jane Geddes	66-74=140	−4
T3	(United States) Janet Anderson	70-72=142	−2
T3	(United States) Beth Daniel	71-71=142	−2
T3	(United States) Shirley Furlong	70-72=142	−2
T3	(United States) Rosie Jones	72-70=142	−2
T3	(United States) Caroline Keggi	67-75=142	−2
T3	(United States) Meg Mallon	71-71=142	−2
T9	(United States) Jerilyn Britz	69-74=143	−1
T9	(United States) Betsy King	72-71=143	−1
T9	(United States) Nancy Rubin	71-72=143	−1
T9	(United States) Hollis Stacy	71-72=143	−1

=== Third round ===
Sunday, July 15, 1990 (morning)

Place	Player	Score	To par
1	(United States) Patty Sheehan	66-68-75=209	−7
2	(United States) Mary Murphy	70-74-69=213	−3
3	(United States) Betsy King	72-71-71=214	−2
T4	(United States) Danielle Ammaccapane	72-73-70=215	−1
T4	(United States) Caroline Keggi	67-75-73=215	−1
T6	(United States) Amy Alcott	72-72-72=216	E
T6	(United States) Beth Daniel	71-71-74=216	E
T8	(United States) Tammie Green	70-74-73=217	+1
T8	(United States) Sherri Turner	74-72-71=217	+1
T8	(United States) Colleen Walker	69-75-73=217	+1

=== Final round ===
Sunday, July 15, 1990 (afternoon)

Place	Player	Score	To par	Money ($)
1	(United States) Betsy King	72-71-71-70=284	−4	85,000
2	(United States) Patty Sheehan	66-68-75-76=285	−3	42,500
T3	(United States) Danielle Ammaccapane	72-73-70-71=286	−2	23,956
T3	(United States) Dottie Pepper	74-74-72-66=286	−2	23,956
5	(United States) Mary Murphy	70-74-69-74=287	−1	15,904
T6	(United States) Elaine Crosby	71-74-73-70=288	E	12,464
T6	(United States) Beth Daniel	71-71-74-72=288	E	12,464
T6	(United States) Tammie Green	70-74-73-71=288	E	12,464
T9	(United States) Amy Alcott	72-72-72-73=289	+1	8,533
T9	(United States) Cathy Gerring	70-78-70-71=289	+1	8,533
T9	(United States) Caroline Keggi	67-75-73-74=289	+1	8,533
T9	(United States) Meg Mallon	71-71-77-70=289	+1	8,533
T9	(United States) Hollis Stacy	71-72-77-69=289	+1	8,533
T9	(United States) Sherri Turner	74-72-71-72=289	+1	8,533
T9	(United States) Colleen Walker	69-75-73-72=289	+1	8,533
