= The Mitchell Company Tournament of Champions =

Golf tournament in the US

The Mitchell Company Tournament of Champions was a golf tournament for professional female golfers on the LPGA Tour. It was played annually from 1994 to 2007 at various sites in the Southeastern United States. It was last played at the Robert Trent Jones Golf Trail Magnolia Grove Golf Course in Mobile, Alabama.

It was one of a small number of limited field events on the LPGA Tour. Only winners of an LPGA event from the previous four years, as well as active Hall of Fame members, were eligible for the tournament.

In 2004, the title sponsor became the Mitchell Company, a real estate development and management firm headquartered in Mobile, Alabama.

Tournament names through the years:

- 1994–1997: Chrysler-Plymouth Tournament of Champions
- 1998: Lifetime's AFLAC Tournament of Champions
- 1999–2001: AFLAC Champions Presented by Southern Living
- 2002–2003: Mobile LPGA Tournament of Champions
- 2004–2006: The Mitchell Company Tournament of Champions presented by Kathy Ireland
- 2007: The Mitchell Company LPGA Tournament of Champions

== Winners ==
Year	Champion	Country	Score	Venue	Purse ($)	Winner's share ($)
2007	Paula Creamer	United States	268 (−20)	Robert Trent Jones Golf Trail, Magnolia Grove	1,000,000	150,000
2006	Lorena Ochoa	Mexico	267 (−21)	Robert Trent Jones Golf Trail, Magnolia Grove	1,000,000	150,000
2005	Christina Kim	United States	273 (−15)	Robert Trent Jones Golf Trail, Magnolia Grove	850,000	138,000
2004	Heather Daly-Donofrio	United States	269 (−19)	Robert Trent Jones Golf Trail, Magnolia Grove	800,000	130,000
2003	Dorothy Delasin	United States	280 (−8)	Robert Trent Jones Golf Trail, Magnolia Grove	750,000	122,000
2002	Se Ri Pak	South Korea	268 (−20)	Robert Trent Jones Golf Trail, Magnolia Grove	750,000	122,000
2001	Se Ri Pak	South Korea	272 (−16)	Robert Trent Jones Golf Trail, Magnolia Grove	750,000	122,000
2000	Karrie Webb	Australia	273 (−15)	Robert Trent Jones Golf Trail, Magnolia Grove	750,000	122,000
1999	Akiko Fukushima	Japan	279 (−9)	Robert Trent Jones Golf Trail, Magnolia Grove	750,000	122,000
1998	Kelly Robbins	United States	276 (−12)	Robert Trent Jones Golf Trail, Grand National	750,000	122,000
1997	Annika Sörenstam	Sweden	272 (−16)	Weston Hills Country Club	700,000	115,000
1996	Liselotte Neumann	Sweden	275 (−13)	Grand Cypress Resort	725,000	117,500
1995	Dawn Coe-Jones	Canada	281 (−7)	Grand Cypress Resort	700,000	115,000
1994	Dottie Mochrie	United States	287 (−1)	Grand Cypress Resort	700,000	115,000

== Tournament record ==
Year	Player	Score	Round	Course
2002	Carin Koch	64 (−10)	1st round	Robert Trent Jones Golf Trail, Magnolia Grove, par 72
