= Cindy Figg-Currier =

American professional golfer (born 1960)

Personal information
- Nationality: United States
- Born: February 23, 1960 (age 66) Mount Pleasant, Michigan, U.S.
- Height: 5 ft 8 in (1.73 m)
- Spouse: Patrick J. Currier
- Children: 2

Career
- Sport: Golf
- College: University of Texas
- Turned professional: 1983
- Current tour: Futures Tour
- Former tours: LPGA Tour (1984–2006); Legends Tour
- Professional wins: 5

Number of wins by tour
- LPGA Tour: 1
- Other: 4

Best results in LPGA major championships
- Chevron Championship: T24: 1998
- Women's PGA C'ship: T5: 1990
- U.S. Women's Open: T26: 1990
- du Maurier Classic: T5: 1997
- Women's British Open: CUT: 2001

Cindy Figg-Currier (born February 23, 1960) is an American professional golfer. She played on the LPGA Tour.

== Early life ==
In 1960, Figg was born in Mount Pleasant, Michigan. She started playing golf at the age of seven.

Figg attended Mount Pleasant High School. At the age of 16, she was the 1976 Toledo, Ohio junior girls golf champion. She was the 1978 Michigan Prep golf champion.

== Amateur career ==
In 1978, Figg entered the University of Texas at Austin. During the era, she was instructed by Paul Marchand and Harvey Penick. She played college golf and was named Most Valuable Player as a senior. She led UT to three top-10 Association for Intercollegiate Athletics for Women (AIAW) national tournament finishes. In 1982, she individually won the Women's Trans-National.

In 1982, Figg graduated with a business-marketing degree.

== Professional career ==
In 1983, Figg turned professional. She joined the LPGA Tour in October 1984. Figg-Currier won once on the LPGA Tour in 1997 after 313 LPGA Tour starts. She also has 31 top-10s on the LPGA Tour. She has also won three times on the Legends Tour and played in the Legends Tour Handa Cup in 2008. Her career earnings exceed two million dollars.

Figg-Currier is currently a board member for The First Tee of Greater Austin.

== Personal life ==
She played under her maiden name, Cindy Figg, early in her career before her marriage to Patrick Currier on July 19, 1986. They have two children.

== Awards and honors ==
- While at the University of Texas at Austin, she earned the Most Valuable Player award during her senior year.
- In 2003, she was inducted into the Michigan Golf Hall of Fame.

== Professional wins (5) ==
=== LPGA Tour wins (1) ===
No.	Date	Tournament	Winning score	Margin of victory	Runners-up
1	Sep 1, 1997	State Farm Rail Classic	–16 (69-63-68=200)	Playoff	(Canada) Lorie Kane (United States) Kris Tschetter

LPGA Tour playoff record (1–0)

No.	Year	Tournament	Opponents	Result
1	1997	State Farm Rail Classic	(Canada) Lorie Kane (United States) Kris Tschetter	Won with birdie on first extra hole

=== Legends Tour (3) ===
- 2008 BJ's Charity Championship (with Sherri Turner), Wendy's Charity Challenge
- 2010 Wendy's Charity Classic

=== Other wins (1) ===
- 2010 Texas Women's Open

== Team appearances ==
Professional

- Handa Cup (representing the United States): 2008 (winners), 2012 (tie, Cup retained), 2013
