= 2016 Legends Tour =

The 2016 Legends Tour was a series of professional golf tour events for women aged 45 and older sanctioned by the Legends Tour. Based in the United States, it is an offshoot of the main U.S.-based women's tour, the LPGA Tour. The tour was founded in 2001, and is intended to allow women to prolong their competitive golf careers on the model of the successful Champions Tour for men.

== Schedule and results ==
The table below shows the schedule of events for the 2016 Legends Tour season. The number in brackets after each winner's name is the number of Legends Tour events she had won up to and including that tournament.

Date	Tournament	Location	Winner(s)	Note
Mar 6	Walgreens Charity Classic	Arizona	(United States) Juli Inkster (2)	
Apr 17	Chico's Patty Berg Memorial	Florida	(Canada) Lorie Kane (3)	
May 9	Legends at Stoney Point	South Carolina	(Canada) Lorie Kane (4)	
Aug 15	Wendy's Charity Classic	Michigan	(Canada) Gail Graham (1)	
Aug 21	The Legends Championship	Indiana	(England) Trish Johnson (1)	
Sep 7	BJ's Charity Pro-Am	Massachusetts		
Oct 30	Walgreens Charity Championship	Florida	(United States) Juli Inkster (3)	
