= Welch's/Fry's Championship =

Defunct women's golf tournament

The Welch's/Fry's Championship was a golf tournament for professional female golfers that was part of the LPGA Tour from 1981 to 2004. It was played at the Randolph Golf Course in Tucson, Arizona. From 1981 to 2002, it was played on the North Course and in 2003 and 2004 it was played on the Dell Urich Course.

It had several different title sponsors during its history.

Tournament names through the years:

- 1981–1982: Arizona Copper Classic
- 1983: Tucson Conquistadores LPGA Open
- 1984: Tucson Conquistadores Open
- 1985–1987: Circle K Tucson Open
- 1988–1990: Circle K LPGA Tucson Open
- 1991–1996: Ping/Welch's Championship
- 1997–2002: Welch's/Circle K Championship
- 2003–2004: Welch's/Fry's Championship

The last tournament was held from March 11 through March 14, 2004.

== Winners ==
Year	Champion	Country	Score	Purse ($)	Winner's share ($)
2004	Karen Stupples	England	258 (−22)	800,000	120,000
2003	Wendy Doolan	Australia	259 (−21)	800,000	120,000
2002	Laura Diaz	United States	270 (−18)	800,000	120,000
2001	Annika Sörenstam	Sweden	265 (−23)	750,000	112,500
2000	Annika Sörenstam	Sweden	269 (−19)	700,000	105,000
1999	Juli Inkster	United States	273 (−15)	625,000	93,750
1998	Helen Alfredsson	Sweden	274 (−14)	500,000	75,000
1997	Donna Andrews	United States	273 (−15)	500,000	75,000
1996	Liselotte Neumann	Sweden	276 (−12)	450,000	67,500
1995	Dottie Pepper	United States	278 (−10)	450,000	67,500
1994	Donna Andrews	United States	276 (−12)	425,000	63,750
1993	Meg Mallon	United States	272 (−16)	400,000	60,000
1992	Brandie Burton	United States	277 (−11)	400,000	60,000
1991	Chris Johnson	United States	273 (−15)	350,000	52,500
1990	Colleen Walker	United States	276 (−12)	300,000	45,000
1989	Lori Garbacz	United States	274 (−14)	300,000	45,000
1988	Laura Davies	England	278 (−10)	300,000	45,000
1987	Betsy King	United States	281 (−7)	200,000	45,000
1986	Penny Pulz	Australia	276 (−12)	200,000	30,000
1985	Amy Alcott	United States	279 (−9)	175,000	26,250
1984	Chris Johnson	United States	272 (−16)	150,000	22,500
1983	Jan Stephenson	Australia	207 (−9)	150,000	22,500
1982	Ayako Okamoto	Japan	281 (−7)	125,000	18,750
1981	Nancy Lopez	United States	278 (−14)	125,000	18,750

== Tournament record ==
Year	Player	Score	Round	Course
1998	Kristi Albers	62 (−10)	2nd	Randolph Golf Course (North), par 72
2003	Meg Mallon	60 (−10)	2nd	Randolph Golf Course (Dell Urich), par 70
2004	Sarah Lee	60 (−10)	1st	Randolph Golf Course (Dell Urich), par 70

== See also ==
- PING/Welch's Championship, another LPGA Tour event, played in Boston, Massachusetts (1993–1997).
