= 1992 LPGA Championship =

Coordinates: 39.015°N 77.152°W

Tournament information
- Dates: May 14–17, 1992
- Location: Bethesda, Maryland
- Course: Bethesda Country Club
- Tour: LPGA Tour
- Format: Stroke play - 72 holes

Statistics
- Par: 71
- Length: 6,272 yards (5,735 m)
- Cut: 147 (+5)
- Prize fund: $1.0 million
- Winner's share: $150,000

Champion
- (United States) Betsy King
- 267 (−17)

Location in the United States
Location in Maryland

The 1992 LPGA Championship was the 38th LPGA Championship, played May 14–17 at Bethesda Country Club in Bethesda, Maryland, a suburb northwest of Washington, D.C.

Betsy King won the fifth of her six major titles, eleven strokes ahead of runners-up JoAnne Carner, Liselotte Neumann, and Karen Noble. She led by five strokes after 54 holes, and her victory margin was the largest to date, passing Patty Sheehan's ten-stroke win in 1984, and it stood until 2010. King was the first to card all four rounds in the sixties in an LPGA major; it was her only win at the LPGA Championship.

This was the third of four consecutive LPGA Championships at Bethesda Country Club.

== Final leaderboard ==
Sunday, May 17, 1992

Place	Player	Score	To par	Money ($)
1	(United States) Betsy King	68-66-67-66=267	−17	150,000
T2	(United States) JoAnne Carner	71-66-70-71=278	−6	71,287
T2	(Sweden) Liselotte Neumann	71-68-70-69=278	−6	71,287
T2	(United States) Karen Noble	73-70-70-65=278	−6	71,287
T5	(Sweden) Helen Alfredsson	69-69-68-73=279	−5	38,998
T5	(United States) Dottie Pepper	71-73-68-67=279	−5	38,998
T7	(United States) Alice Ritzman	68-71-71-70=280	−4	27,928
T7	(United States) Patty Sheehan	71-70-69-70=280	−4	27,928
9	(United States) Juli Inkster	70-71-66-74=281	−3	23,651
T10	(United States) Amy Alcott	69-69-73-71=282	−2	20,128
T10	(United States) Brandie Burton	68-73-70-71=282	−2	20,128
