= The Founders Award =

Award given by the LPGA

The William and Mousie Powell Award is an award given each year since 1986 by the LPGA Tour to a player who "whose behavior and deeds best exemplifies the spirit, ideals and values of the LPGA." The recipient is selected annually by a vote of LPGA Tour members. The award was renamed to the Founders Award in 2019.

It was established by Mousie Powell, an honorary member and longtime supporter of the LPGA, and named in honor of Powell and her husband, William Powell, a Hollywood actor of the mid-twentieth century.

== Winners ==
- 1986 Kathy Whitworth
- 1987 Nancy Lopez
- 1988 Marlene Hagge
- 1989 Heather Farr
- 1990 Judy Dickinson
- 1991 Pat Bradley
- 1992 Shelley Hamlin
- 1993 Alice Miller
- 1994 Jill Briles-Hinton
- 1995 JoAnne Carner
- 1996 Betsy King
- 1997 Sherri Turner
- 1998 Judy Rankin
- 1999 Meg Mallon
- 2000 Lorie Kane
- 2001 Wendy Ward
- 2002 Gail Graham
- 2003 Suzy Whaley
- 2004 Juli Inkster
- 2005 Heather Daly-Donofrio
- 2006 Vicki Goetze-Ackerman
- 2007 Natalie Gulbis
- 2008 Hilary Lunke
- 2009 Lorena Ochoa
- 2010–11 No award
- 2012 Ai Miyazato
- 2013 Amanda Blumenherst
- 2014 Chella Choi
- 2015 Juli Inkster
- 2016 Karrie Webb
- 2017 Katherine Kirk
- 2018 So Yeon Ryu
- 2019 Brooke Henderson
- 2020 No award
- 2021 Lydia Ko
- 2022 Chun In-gee
- 2023 Lexi Thompson
- 2024 Ally Ewing
- 2025 Stacy Lewis
