= McDonald's Championship (golf) =

Golf tournament formerly on the LPGA Tour

Coordinates: 39.789°N 75.564°W

Tournament information
- Location: Wilmington, Delaware, U.S.
- Established: 1981
- Course: DuPont Country Club
- Par: 71
- Length: 6,398 yards (5,850 m)
- Tour: LPGA Tour
- Format: Stroke play - 72 holes
- Prize fund: $900,000
- Month played: May
- Final year: 1993

Final champion
- (England) Laura Davies
- Location in United States Location in Delaware

The McDonald's Championship was a women's professional golf tournament on the LPGA Tour from 1981 through 1993. The first six years were hosted by White Manor Country Club in Malvern, Pennsylvania, northwest of Philadelphia. In 1987, it moved a short distance south to DuPont Country Club in Wilmington, Delaware.

The tournament was founded by Herb Lotman, founder and CEO of Keystone Foods. His co-founder was Frank Quinn. The 28 year old tournament is still the largest fundraiser in the history of golf donating over $47 million to charity. Herb Lotman was quoted as saying, "everything we did, we did for 'the kids'."

In its first year in 1981, the purse was $150,000 with a winner's share of $22,500, won by Sandra Post. The last edition in 1993 had a purse of $900,000; Laura Davies won by a stroke and took the $135,000 winner's share.

Beginning in 1994, McDonald's sponsored the next sixteen editions of the LPGA Championship, one of the tour's four major championships, and the regular tour event was retired. Play continued at DuPont Country Club in Wilmington from 1994 through 2004, then moved in 2005 to Bulle Rock Golf Course in nearby Havre de Grace, Maryland. After the 2009 edition, McDonald's ended its 29-year relationship with the LPGA Tour.

== Winners ==
McDonald's Championship

- 1993 Laura Davies
- 1992 Ayako Okamoto
- 1991 Beth Daniel (2)
- 1990 Patty Sheehan (2)
- 1989 Betsy King (2)
- 1988 Kathy Postlewait
- 1987 Betsy King
- 1986 Juli Inkster
- 1985 Alice Miller

McDonald's Kids Classic

- 1984 Patty Sheehan
- 1983 Beth Daniel

McDonald's Classic

- 1982 JoAnne Carner

McDonald's Kids Classic

- 1981 Sandra Post
