= Heather Farr Player Award =

The Heather Farr Player Award is an award given each year since 1994 by the LPGA Tour to an LPGA golfer "who, through her hard work, dedication and love of the game of golf, has demonstrated determination, perseverance and spirit in fulfilling her goals as a player."

It was established in the memory of Heather Farr, an LPGA player who died of breast cancer at the age of 28 in 1993.

== Winners ==
- 1994 Heather Farr
- 1995 Shelley Hamlin
- 1996 Martha Nause
- 1997 Terry-Jo Myers
- 1998 Lorie Kane
- 1999 Nancy Scranton
- 2000 Brandie Burton
- 2001 Kris Tschetter
- 2002 Kim Williams
- 2003 Beth Daniel
- 2004 Colleen Walker
- 2005 Amy Read
- 2006 Se Ri Pak
- 2007 Lorena Ochoa
- 2008 Leta Lindley
- 2009 Catriona Matthew
- 2010–2011 No award
- 2012 Sophie Gustafson
- 2013 Reilley Rankin
- 2014 Lisa Ferrero
- 2015 Stephanie Meadow
- 2016 Ariya Jutanugarn
- 2017 Tiffany Joh
- 2018 Jessica Korda
- 2019 Suzann Pettersen
- 2020 No award
- 2021 Madelene Sagström
- 2022 Elizabeth Nagel
- 2023 Jane Park
- 2024 Lydia Ko
- 2025 Lindy Duncan

== See also ==
- List of sports awards honoring women
