= 1997 du Maurier Classic =

Coordinates: 43.4522°N 79.7185°W

The 1997 du Maurier Classic was contested from July 31 to August 3 at Glen Abbey Golf Course. It was the 25th edition of the du Maurier Classic, and the 19th edition as a major championship on the LPGA Tour.

This event was won by Colleen Walker.

== Final leaderboard ==
Place	Player	Score	To par	Money (US$)
1	(United States) Colleen Walker	68-72-73-65=278	−14	180,000
2	(Sweden) Liselotte Neumann	71-67-73-69=280	−12	111,711
T3	(United States) Betsy King	71-69-72-69=281	−11	72,461
T3	(United States) Kelly Robbins	71-65-73-72=281	−11	72,461
T5	(United States) Cindy Figg-Currier	69-74-69-70=282	−10	46,797
T5	(United States) Juli Inkster	70-69-71-72=282	−10	46,797
T7	(United States) Rosie Jones	69-71-71-72=283	−9	33,513
T7	(United States) Emilee Klein	73-70-71-69=283	−9	33,513
T9	(England) Lisa Hackney	73-69-75-67=284	−8	26,871
T9	(United States) Christa Johnson	70-72-72-70=284	−8	26,871
