= Vicki Goetze =

American professional golfer (born 1972)

Personal information
- Full name: Vicki Goetze-Ackerman
- Nationality: United States
- Born: October 17, 1972 (age 54) Mishicot, Wisconsin, U.S.
- Height: 5 ft 5 in (1.65 m)

Career
- Sport: Golf
- College: University of Georgia
- Turned professional: 1993
- Former tour: LPGA Tour (1994–2009)

Best results in LPGA major championships
- Chevron Championship: T14: 2002
- Women's PGA C'ship: T25: 2002
- U.S. Women's Open: T28: 1991
- du Maurier Classic: T44: 1996
- Women's British Open: T6: 2003

Achievements and awards
- LPGA William and Mousie Powell Award: 2006
- Honda Broderick Award: 1992

Vicki Goetze-Ackerman (born October 17, 1972) is an American professional golfer.

Goetze was born in Mishicot, Wisconsin. Living in Hull, Georgia, she was voted "Player of the Year" from 1988 to 1990 by the American Junior Golf Association. In 1989 she was still only 16 years old when she defeated Brandie Burton to become the third youngest winner in the history of the U.S. Women's Amateur at the Pinehurst Country Club, in Pinehurst, North Carolina. She was named the 1989 Titleist/Golfweek Amateur Player of the Year.

Enrolled at the University of Georgia, in 1992 Goetze was the NCAA golfing champion. That year she defeated Annika Sörenstam to win her second U.S. Women Amateur becoming the first teenager to ever hold both the NCAA and U.S. Women's Amateur championships simultaneously. She was a member of the U.S. Curtis Cup team and the U.S. team at the 1990 and 1992 Espirito Santo Trophy. In 1991 and 1992 she earned her second and third Titleist/Golfweek Amateur Player of the Year award. She was awarded the Honda-Broderick Cup in 1992, recognizing her as the National Player of the Year and was also named the National Player of the Year in 1993 by the National Golf Coaches Association. Goetze was also honored as an All-American in 1992 and 1993.

Goetze joined the LPGA Tour in 1994. Although she has been competitive and twice was runner-up at the LPGA Corning Classic, Goetze has not achieved the same level of success as she had as an amateur and has yet to win an LPGA tournament. She married Jim Ackerman in 1997 and in 2005 gave birth to their first child, son Jacob Aiden Ackerman.

== Playoff record ==
LPGA Tour playoff record (0–1)

No.	Year	Tournament	Opponents	Result
1	2000	LPGA Corning Classic	(United States) Betsy King (United States) Kelli Kuehne	King won with birdie on second extra hole

== U.S. national team appearances ==
Amateur

- Curtis Cup: 1990 (winners), 1992
- Espirito Santo Trophy: 1990 (winners), 1992
