= Sybase Classic =

Golf tournament formerly on the LPGA Tour

Coordinates: 40.848°N 74.175°W

Tournament information
- Location: Clifton, New Jersey, U.S.
- Established: 1990
- Courses: Upper Montclair Country Club (2007-2009)
- Par: 72
- Length: 6,413 yards (5,864 m)
- Tour: LPGA Tour
- Format: Stroke play – 72 holes
- Prize fund: $2,000,000 in 2009
- Month played: May
- Final year: 2009

Tournament record score
- Aggregate: 270 Lorena Ochoa (2008)
- To par: –18 Lorena Ochoa (2008)

Final champion
- (South Korea) Ji Young Oh (2009)

The Sybase Classic was a women's professional golf tournament on the LPGA Tour for twenty years, from 1990 to 2009. The event was originally known as the "Big Apple Classic", but the name was dropped in 2007 when the tournament relocated from the New York City area to New Jersey. From 1992 through 2006, ShopRite sponsored the ShopRite LPGA Classic in Atlantic City.

For its first seventeen years, the event was held at the Wykagyl Country Club in the Wykagyl section of New Rochelle, New York. In 2007 the venue was changed to the Upper Montclair Country Club in Clifton, New Jersey. The tournament was last played in 2009, as Sybase switched its sponsorship to the Sybase Match Play Championship in 2010, also played in New Jersey. ShopRite revived its sponsorship of the ShopRite LPGA Classic in Atlantic City in 2010.

Over the years, proceeds from the event went to benefit charities such as St. Joseph's Healthcare System, Inc. and the Boys & Girls Club of Clifton.

Tournament names through the years:

- 1990-1998: JAL Big Apple Classic presented by GOLF Magazine
- 1999-2000: Japan Airlines Big Apple Classic presented by GOLF Magazine
- 2001-2002: Sybase Big Apple Classic presented by GOLF Magazine
- 2003: Sybase Big Apple Classic presented by Lincoln Mercury
- 2004-2006: Sybase Classic presented by Lincoln Mercury
- 2007-2009: Sybase Classic presented by ShopRite

== Winners ==
Year	Dates	Champion	Country	Score	Tournament Location	Purse ($)	Winner's share ($)
2009	May 19	Ji Young Oh	South Korea	264 (−14)	Upper Montclair Country Club	2,000,000	300,000
2008*	May 18	Lorena Ochoa (3)	Mexico	206 (−10)	Upper Montclair Country Club	2,000,000	300,000
2007	May 20	Lorena Ochoa (2)	Mexico	270 (−18)	Upper Montclair Country Club	1,400,000	210,000
2006*	May 21	Lorena Ochoa	Mexico	208 (−5)	Wykagyl Country Club	1,300,000	195,000
2005	May 22	Paula Creamer	United States	278 (−6)	Wykagyl Country Club	1,250,000	187,500
2004	May 23	Sherri Steinhauer	United States	272 (−12)	Wykagyl Country Club	950,000	142,500
2003	Jul 20	Hee-Won Han	South Korea	273 (−11)	Wykagyl Country Club	950,000	142,500
2002	Jul 28	Gloria Park	South Korea	270 (−14)	Wykagyl Country Club	950,000	142,500
2001	Jul 22	Rosie Jones	United States	272 (−12)	Wykagyl Country Club	950,000	142,500
2000*	Jul 16	Annika Sörenstam (2)	Sweden	206 (−7)	Wykagyl Country Club	900,000	135,000
1999	Jul 18	Sherri Steinhauer	United States	265 (−19)	Wykagyl Country Club	850,000	127,500
1998	Jul 19	Annika Sörenstam	Sweden	279 (−9)	Wykagyl Country Club	775,000	116,250
1997	Jul 20	Michele Redman	United States	272 (−12)	Wykagyl Country Club	750,000	112,500
1996	Oct 5	Caroline Pierce	England	211 (−2)	Wykagyl Country Club	725,000	108,750
1995	Jul 23	Tracy Kerdyk	United States	273 (−11)	Wykagyl Country Club	700,000	105,000
1994	Jul 17	Beth Daniel	United States	276 (−8)	Wykagyl Country Club	650,000	97,500
1993	Jul 18	Hiromi Kobayashi	Japan	278 (−6)	Wykagyl Country Club	600,000	90,000
1992	Jul 19	Juli Inkster	United States	273 (−11)	Wykagyl Country Club	500,000	75,000
1991	Jul 21	Betsy King (2)	United States	279 (−5)	Wykagyl Country Club	500,000	75,000
1990	Aug 19	Betsy King	United States	273 (−15)	Wykagyl Country Club	400,000	60,000

* The 2000, 2006 and 2008 tournaments were shortened to 54 holes because of rain.

== Tournament record ==
Year	Player	Score	Round	Course
1990	Betsy King	63 (−9)	3rd	Wykagyl Country Club
2002	Gloria Park	63 (−9)	3rd	Wykagyl Country Club
2009	Helen Alfredsson	62 (−10)	1st	Upper Montclair Country Club
