= Sherri Turner =

American professional golfer (born 1956)

Personal information
- Full name: Sherri Turner
- Nationality: United States
- Born: October 4, 1956 (age 70) Greenville, South Carolina, U.S.
- Height: 5 ft 5 in (1.65 m)
- Life partner: Ellie Gibson

Career
- Sport: Golf
- College: Furman University
- Turned professional: 1979
- Current tour: Legends Tour
- Former tour: LPGA Tour (1984–2008)
- Professional wins: 6

Number of wins by tour
- LPGA Tour: 3
- Other: 3

Best results in LPGA major championships (wins: 1)
- Chevron Championship: T3: 1995
- Women's PGA C'ship: Won: 1988
- U.S. Women's Open: 2nd: 1999
- du Maurier Classic: 3rd: 1988
- Women's British Open: DNP

Achievements and awards
- LPGA Tour Money Winner: 1988
- GWAA Female Player of the Year: 1988
- LPGA William and Mousie Powell Award: 1997

Sherri Turner (born October 4, 1956) is an American professional golfer. She became a member of the LPGA Tour in 1984 and won three LPGA Tour events, including one major championship, during her career.

== Early life ==
In 1956, Turner was born in Greenville, South Carolina. She started playing golf at the age of 4. Turner was diagnosed with type 1 diabetes at the age of 14. Turner was the 1974-75 Carolinas Junior champion.

== Amateur career ==
Turner attended Furman University where she was a medalist at three tournaments, including the Women's Southern Intercollegiate. She was selected to the All-American Team in 1979.

== Professional career ==
Always one of the longest hitters on Tour, Turner joined the LPGA Tour in 1984. She won three events on the tour, including one major, the 1988 Mazda LPGA Championship. In 1988, she topped the money list and was named Female Player of the Year by Golf Writers Association of America, Golf Illustrated, Golf World, and Golf Magazine. The following year she was tenth on the money list, but from that point on her form faded, and she only finished in the top forty in two more years. In 1999, she was a runner up at the U.S. Women's Open. She also had over 100 top-10 finishes in her LPGA career.

She was a member of the LPGA Player Executive Committee from 1997 to 1999.

== Awards and honors ==
- In 1979, while at Furman University she was selected to the All-American Team.
- In 1988, Turner led the LPGA money list.
- In 1988, she was named Female Player of the Year by Golf Writers Association of America.
- In 1988, she was also named Female Golfer of the Year by a number of magazines: Golf Illustrated, Golf World, and Golf Magazine.
- In 1989, Turner was inducted into the Furman Athletic Hall of Fame.
- In 1990, she became the first inductee into the NutraSweet Hall of Fame.
- She is also an honorary member of the South Carolina Hall of Fame.

== Professional wins (6) ==
=== LPGA Tour wins (3) ===
Legend
LPGA Tour major championships (1)
Other LPGA Tour (2)

No.	Date	Tournament	Winning score	Margin of victory	Runner(s)-up
1	May 22, 1988	Mazda LPGA Championship	−7 (70-71-73-67=281)	1 stroke	(United States) Amy Alcott
2	May 29, 1988	LPGA Corning Classic	−15 (71-63-69-70=273)	2 strokes	(United States) JoAnne Carner (South Korea) Ok-Hee Ku
3	Feb 18, 1989	Orix Hawaiian Ladies Open	−11 (70-69-66=205)	4 strokes	(United States) Sara Anne McGetrick

LPGA Tour playoff record (0–2)

No.	Year	Tournament	Opponent(s)	Result
1	1988	Sara Lee Classic	(United States) Tammie Green (United States) Patti Rizzo (United States) Kim Williams	Rizzo won with birdie on fifth extra hole Green and Williams eliminated by par on first hole
2	1988	Lady Keystone Open	(United States) Shirley Furlong	Lost to par on first extra hole

=== Legends Tour wins (3) ===
- 2008 BJ's Charity Championship (with Cindy Figg-Currier)
- 2012 Hannaford Community Challenge
- 2013 Swing for the Cure with Legends of the LPGA

== Major championships ==
=== Wins (1) ===
Year	Championship	Winning score	Margin	Runner-up
1988	Mazda LPGA Championship	−7 (70-71-73-67=281)	1 stroke	(United States) Amy Alcott

=== Results timeline ===
Tournament	1984	1985	1986	1987	1988	1989
Kraft Nabisco Championship	T58	T26	71	CUT	T17	T18
LPGA Championship	CUT	T12		T28	1	T8
U.S. Women's Open	62	T39	T21	T21	T29	CUT
du Maurier Classic	T13	T64	T8	CUT	3	T36

Tournament	1990	1991	1992	1993	1994	1995	1996	1997	1998	1999	2000
Kraft Nabisco Championship	CUT	T46	CUT	T30	T28	T3	CUT	T48	CUT	T51	T62
LPGA Championship	CUT	CUT	T52	CUT	CUT	T26	CUT	CUT	CUT	CUT	CUT
U.S. Women's Open	T9	CUT	T42		T51	T51	T58			2	CUT
du Maurier Classic	T17				T57			CUT	CUT	T9	CUT

Tournament	2001	2002	2003	2004	2005	2006	2007	2008
Kraft Nabisco Championship		T62					CUT	
LPGA Championship	T33	T33	CUT	CUT	CUT	CUT	T41	CUT
U.S. Women's Open	T4	T58	49			T16	T46	T53
Women's British Open ^								

^ The Women's British Open replaced the du Maurier Classic as an LPGA major in 2001.

Win
Top 10
Did not play

CUT = missed the half-way cut
"T" = tied

=== Summary ===
Tournament	Wins	2nd	3rd	Top-5	Top-10	Top-25	Events	Cuts made
Kraft Nabisco Championship	0	0	1	1	1	3	19	13
LPGA Championship	1	0	0	1	2	3	24	9
U.S. Women's Open	0	1	0	2	3	6	20	17
du Maurier Classic	0	0	1	1	3	5	12	8
Women's British Open	0	0	0	0	0	0	0	0
Totals	1	1	2	5	9	17	75	47

- Most consecutive cuts made – 9 (1984 U.S. Open – 1986 du Maurier Classic)
- Longest streak of top-10s – 2 (1988 LPGA – 1988 du Maurier Classic)

== U.S. national team appearances ==
Professional

- Handa Cup: 2007 (winners), 2008 (winners), 2009 (winners), 2010 (winners), 2012 (tie, Cup retained), 2013, 2014 (winners)
