= Gail Graham =

Canadian professional golfer (born 1964)

Personal information
- Full name: Gail Anderson Graham
- Nationality: Canada
- Born: January 16, 1964 (age 62) Vanderhoof, British Columbia, Canada
- Height: 5 ft 3 in (1.60 m)

Career
- Sport: Golf
- College: Lamar University
- Turned professional: 1988
- Former tour: LPGA Tour (1990–2006)
- Professional wins: 5

Number of wins by tour
- LPGA Tour: 2
- Epson Tour: 1
- Other: 2

Best results in LPGA major championships
- Chevron Championship: T6: 1994
- Women's PGA C'ship: T6: 1997
- U.S. Women's Open: T6: 1992
- du Maurier Classic: T4: 1998
- Women's British Open: DNP

Achievements and awards
- LPGA William and Mousie Powell Award: 2002
- Manitoba Golf Hall of Fame: 2008
- British Columbia Golf Hall of Fame: 2015
- Canadian Golf Hall of Fame: 2017

Gail Anderson Graham (born January 16, 1964) is a Canadian professional golfer who played on the LPGA Tour.

Graham won twice on the LPGA Tour in 1995 and 1997.

Graham won the LPGA Tour's William and Mousie Powell Award (later renamed the Founders Award) in 2002. She was inducted into the Manitoba Golf Hall of Fame in 2008, the British Columbia Golf Hall of Fame in 2015, and the Canadian Golf Hall of Fame in 2017.

== Professional wins ==
=== LPGA Tour wins (2) ===
No.	Date	Tournament	Winning score	Margin of victory	Runner-up
1	1 Oct 1995	Fieldcrest Cannon Classic	–15 (67-68-69-69=273)	2 strokes	(United States) Tammie Green
2	2 Mar 1997	Alpine Australian Ladies Masters	–15 (66-68-71-68=273)	1 stroke	(Australia) Karrie Webb

=== Futures Tour wins ===
- 1988 Manhattan Classic

=== Other wins ===
- 1988 Canadian PGA Women's Championship

=== Legends Tour win ===
- 2016 Wendy's Charity Classic

== Team appearances ==
Professional

- Handa Cup (representing World team): 2009, 2010, 2011, 2012 (tie), 2013 (winners)
