= Vicki Fergon =

American professional golfer (born 1955)

Personal information
- Nationality: United States
- Born: September 29, 1955 (age 71) Palo Alto, California, U.S.
- Height: 5 ft 9 in (1.75 m)

Career
- Sport: Golf
- Turned professional: 1977
- Former tours: LPGA Tour (1977–2003); Legends Tour; Futures Tour (2003)
- Professional wins: 5

Number of wins by tour
- LPGA Tour: 3
- Epson Tour: 1
- Other: 1

Best results in LPGA major championships
- Chevron Championship: 8th: 1983
- Women's PGA C'ship: 9th: 1980
- U.S. Women's Open: T7: 1989
- du Maurier Classic: T5: 1993
- Women's British Open: DNP

Vicki Fergon (born September 29, 1955) is an American professional golfer who played on the LPGA Tour.

== Career ==
In 1977, Fergon turned professional. She won three times on the LPGA Tour between 1979 and 1996.

Fergon played on the Women's Senior Golf Tour (now Legends Tour) starting in 2000. She won the 2000 Shopko Great Lakes Classic.

In 2003, Fergon also played on the Futures Tour, winning the IOS Futures Golf Classic, and became the first woman to win on all three LPGA-affiliated tours.

== Professional wins (5) ==
=== LPGA Tour wins (3) ===
No.	Date	Tournament	Winning score	Margin of victory	Runner(s)-up
1	Jul 1, 1979	Lady Stroh's Open	−4 (73-69-73-69=284)	1 stroke	(United States) Judy Rankin
2	Apr 22, 1984	S&H Golf Classic	−13 (68-67-71-69=275)	1 stroke	(United States) Betsy King
3	Jul 26, 1996	Michelob Light Heartland Classic	−12 (71-63-68-74=276)	4 strokes	(United States) Pat Hurst (United States) Patti Liscio

=== Legends Tour wins (1) ===
- 2000 Shopko Great Lakes Classic

=== Futures Tour wins (1) ===
- 2003 IOS Futures Golf Classic
