= Indianwood Golf and Country Club =

Private country club in Orion Township, Michigan

Coordinates: 42°47′15″N 83°16′04″W

Indianwood Golf and Country Club or simply "Indianwood" is a private member-only country club located in Orion Township, Oakland County, near Lake Orion, Michigan. The club is approximately 35 miles (56 km) north of Detroit.

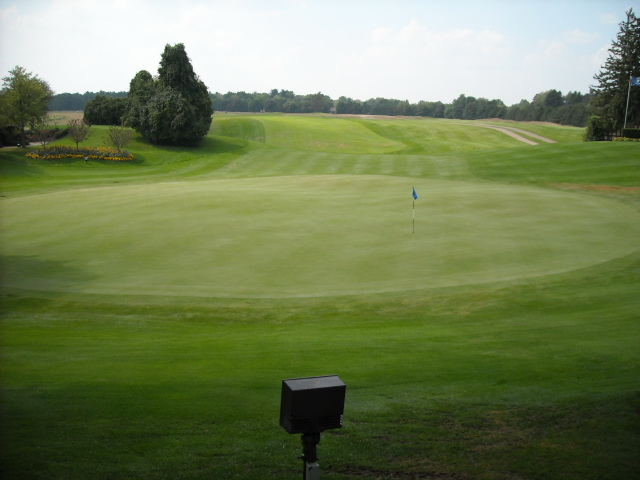
Indianwood's huge 18th green

== History ==
The "Old Course" was designed by Wilfrid Reid in 1925, the original club features a tower entrance, 18th century tapestries, leaded glass windows, and Knights in shining armor. The ballroom features a magnificent fireplace complete with an intricate shield carved from wood hanging over the mantel. According to historians, the club quickly became a haven for the wealthy of Detroit seeking to avoid the daily grind of the city. The club became very popular, hosting the Michigan Open in 1928, and even saw the construction of an airstrip. In 1930 the club hosted the Western Open, one of the most prestigious golf events of the time. In 1948 and 1949 it was site of the Michigan PGA Championship, won by Horton Smith and Chick Harbert, respectively.

The 1960s and 1970s saw Indianwood fall into decline. The bustling club fell into disrepair, with holes in the floors and beams hanging from the ceiling. In 1981, Detroit-area businessman Stan Aldridge purchased the building and surrounding land after being outbid for the Detroit Red Wings by Mike Ilitch. Aldridge, a non-golfer, saw the club as an investment and sought to restore the club to its former glory. Two of Aldridge's uncles were members of the club in the 1950s, and he we could accompany them to Sunday brunches. The original buildings and barns were restored, and the 30,000-square-foot (2,800 m^{2}) clubhouse and locker room addition was completed in 1989. Eventually a "New Course" for golf would be added to the original in 1988.

In 1989, the re-established club hosted its largest event, the 1989 U.S. Women's Open won by Betsy King. It would host the event again 5 years later in 1994, which was won by Patty Sheehan. It hosted the U.S. Senior Open in 2012, won by Roger Chapman.

== Management ==
Stan Aldridge and his children are still connected to the club through day-to-day operations, new construction, and design. Son Keith Aldridge, a former professional hockey player, serves as the club's Vice President and General Manager. Dave Zink has been the head golf professional since 1981.

For his work with Indianwood and other courses in the state, Stan Aldridge was elected to the Michigan Golf Hall of Fame in 2005.

== Major tournaments ==
- 1930 Western Open, winner Gene Sarazen
- 1989 U.S. Women's Open, winner Betsy King
- 1994 U.S. Women's Open, winner Patty Sheehan
- 2012 U.S. Senior Open, winner Roger Chapman
