= Terry-Jo Myers =

American professional golfer (born 1962)

Personal information
- Nationality: United States
- Born: July 23, 1962 (age 64) Fort Myers, Florida, U.S.
- Height: 5 ft 9 in (1.75 m)

Career
- Sport: Golf
- College: Florida International University
- Status: Professional
- Former tours: LPGA Tour (1986-2003); Legends Tour
- Professional wins: 3

Number of wins by tour
- LPGA Tour: 3

Best results in LPGA major championships
- Chevron Championship: T16: 1995
- Women's PGA C'ship: T11: 1993
- U.S. Women's Open: 56th: 2001
- du Maurier Classic: T25: 1987
- Women's British Open: DNP

Achievements and awards
- LPGA Heather Farr Award: 1997

Terry-Jo Myers (born July 23, 1962) is an American professional golfer who played on the LPGA Tour.

Myers won three times on the LPGA Tour between 1988 and 1997.

Myers suffered from interstitial cystitis throughout her career. She was awarded the 1997 Heather Farr Player Award by the LPGA Tour and the 1998 Ben Hogan Award from the Golf Writers Association of America.

== Professional wins ==
=== LPGA Tour wins (3) ===
No.	Date	Tournament	Winning score	Margin of victory	Runner(s)-up
1	Jul 10, 1988	Mayflower Classic	−8 (68-69-68-71=276)	1 stroke	(United States) Amy Alcott (Japan) Ayako Okamoto
2	Feb 16, 1997	Los Angeles Women's Championship	−10 (74-66-66=206)	2 strokes	(Sweden) Annika Sörenstam
3	May 11, 1997	Sara Lee Classic	−9 (70-67-70=207)	Playoff	(Canada) Nancy Harvey (United States) Laurel Kean

LPGA Tour playoff record (1–0)

No.	Year	Tournament	Opponents	Result
1	1997	Sara Lee Classic	(Canada) Nancy Harvey (United States) Laurel Kean	Won with par on fifth extra hole Harvey eliminated by birdie on first hole
