= 1997 Nabisco Dinah Shore =

Coordinates: 33.798°N 116.433°W

Tournament information
- Dates: March 27–30, 1997
- Location: Rancho Mirage, California
- Courses: Mission Hills Country Club; Dinah Shore Tourn. Course
- Tour: LPGA Tour
- Format: Stroke play - 72 holes

Statistics
- Par: 72
- Length: 6,460 yards (5,907 m)
- Field: 119 players, 74 after cut
- Cut: 149 (+5)
- Prize fund: $900,000
- Winner's share: $135,000

Champion
- (United States) Betsy King
- 276 (−12)

Location in the United States
Location in California

The 1997 Nabisco Dinah Shore was a women's professional golf tournament, held March 27–30 at Mission Hills Country Club in Rancho Mirage, California. This was the 26th edition of the Nabisco Dinah Shore, and the fifteenth as a major championship.

Betsy King, age 41, won her third title in this event, two strokes ahead of runners-up Kris Tschetter and Amy Fruhwirth. It was the last of her six major titles.

At $900,000, this was the tournament's last six-figure purse; the winner's share was $135,000.

== Final leaderboard ==
Sunday, March 30, 1997

Place	Player	Score	To par	Money ($)
1	(United States) Betsy King	71-67-67-71=276	−12	135,000
2	(United States) Kris Tschetter	66-76-66-70=278	−10	83,783
T3	(United States) Amy Fruhwirth	69-70-68-72=279	−9	54,346
T3	(United States) Kelly Robbins	70-67-68-74=279	−9	54,346
T5	(United States) Nanci Bowen	70-74-70-68=282	−6	35,097
T5	(England) Lisa Hackney	70-72-72-68=282	−6	35,097
7	(United States) Tina Barrett	70-71-70-72=283	−5	26,720
T8	(Japan) Hiromi Kobayashi	72-69-71-72=284	−4	21,285
T8	(Sweden) Annika Sörenstam	70-72-68-74=284	−4	21,285
T8	(United States) Mary Beth Zimmerman	75-74-72-63=284	−4	21,285
