= Hiromi Kobayashi (golfer) =

Japanese professional golfer

Hiromi Kobayashi 小林 浩美
Personal information
- Nationality: Japan
- Born: 8 January 1963 (age 63) Iwaki, Fukushima
- Height: 1.70 m (5 ft 7 in)

Career
- Sport: Golf
- Turned professional: 1985
- Former tours: LPGA Tour (1990–2003); LPGA of Japan Tour (joined 1985)
- Professional wins: 15

Number of wins by tour
- LPGA Tour: 4
- Ladies European Tour: 1
- LPGA of Japan Tour: 11

Best results in LPGA major championships
- Chevron Championship: T8: 1997
- Women's PGA C'ship: T3: 1994
- U.S. Women's Open: T4: 1993
- du Maurier Classic: T9: 1998
- Women's British Open: T32: 2001

Achievements and awards
- LPGA Rookie of the Year: 1990

Hiromi Kobayashi (小林 浩美, Kobayashi Hiromi; born 8 January 1963 in Iwaki, Fukushima) is a Japanese professional golfer. She has won 15 tournaments internationally, including four on the U.S.-based LPGA Tour.

== Professional career ==
Kobayashi turned pro in 1985. She won six titles on the LPGA of Japan Tour in 1989. In 1990, she joined the LPGA Tour and was named LPGA Rookie of the Year. She won four tournaments between 1993 and 1998. She also won one title on the Ladies European Tour, the Evian Masters in 1997.

== Professional wins (15) ==
=== LPGA of Japan Tour (11) ===
- 1989 (6) Sky Court Ladies, Tohoku Queens, Mizuno Ladies Open, **Japan Women's Open Golf Championship**, Junon Women's Open, Daio Paper Elleair Women's Open
- 1991 (1) Itsuki Classic
- 1995 (2) Fujitsu Ladies, Kibun Women's Classic
- 1998 (1) Japan Classic (co-sanctioned by the LPGA Tour)
- 2002 (1) Daio Paper Elleair Ladies Open

Tournament in bold denotes major championships in LPGA of Japan Tour.

=== LPGA Tour (4) ===
No.	Date	Tournament	Winning score	Margin of victory	Runner(s)-up
1	18 Jul 1993	JAL Big Apple Classic	−6 (69-71-69-69=278)	4 strokes	(United States) Rosie Jones
2	22 Aug 1993	Minnesota LPGA Classic	−11 (73-67-65=205)	Playoff	(United States) Cindy Rarick
3	23 Aug 1998	Rainbow Foods LPGA Classic	−10 (69-68-69=206)	Playoff	(United States) Tracy Hanson
4	8 Nov 1998	Japan Classic	−11 (68-68-69=205)	Playoff	(United States) Tina Barrett

LPGA Tour playoff record (3–1)

No.	Year	Tournament	Opponent(s)	Result
1	1993	Minnesota LPGA Classic	(United States) Cindy Rarick	Won with par on first extra hole
2	1998	Los Angeles Women's Championship	(United States) Dale Eggeling	Lost to birdie on first extra hole
3	1998	Rainbow Foods LPGA Classic	(United States) Tracy Hanson	Won with birdie on first extra hole
4	1998	Japan Classic	(United States) Tina Barrett	Won with birdie on third extra hole

=== Ladies European Tour (1) ===
- 1997 (1) Evian Masters

== Team appearances ==
Amateur

- Espirito Santo Trophy (representing Japan): 1986
