= Kris Tschetter =

American professional golfer (born 1964)

Personal information
- Nationality: United States
- Born: December 30, 1964 (age 61) Detroit, Michigan, U.S.
- Height: 5 ft 7 in (1.70 m)

Career
- Sport: Golf
- College: Texas Christian University
- Status: Professional
- Former tour: LPGA Tour (joined 1988)
- Professional wins: 3

Number of wins by tour
- LPGA Tour: 1
- Other: 2

Best results in LPGA major championships
- Chevron Championship: 2nd: 1997
- Women's PGA C'ship: T11: 1993
- U.S. Women's Open: 2nd: 1996
- du Maurier Classic: T12: 1995
- Women's British Open: T42: 2005

Achievements and awards
- LPGA Heather Farr Player Award: 2001

Kris Tschetter (born December 30, 1964) is an American professional golfer who played on the LPGA Tour.

== Early life and amateur career ==
In 1964, Tschetter was born in Detroit, Michigan.

As an amateur, she won the 1983 American Junior Golf Association Tournament of Champions and was a four-time consecutive winner of the South Dakota State Women's Amateur Championship (1983–86). In 1984, she qualified for the U.S. Women's Open and the following year was a quarterfinalist at the Trans-National.

In 1987, Tschetter attended Texas Christian University (TCU) graduating as a Radio, Television, and Film Major. She was a three-time member of the All-Southwest Conference Team.

Tschetter, as a freshman, was a member of Shady Oaks Golf Club in Fort Worth where she developed a relationship with the late Ben Hogan. Tschetter one day convinced Hogan to play nine holes of golf with two of her teammates from TCU. He duck-hooked the first tee shot but finished at even par. This, according to Tschetter, is the last time that Hogan ever played golf. They remained friends until his death in 1997. Tschetter has written a book called Mr. Hogan, the Man I Knew: An LPGA Player Looks Back on an Amazing Friendship and Lessons She Learned from Golf's Greatest Legend recounting her times with Hogan.

== Professional career ==
In 1988, Tschetter turned pro. In 1992, she won her only LPGA event. She won the Northgate Computer Classic by three shots over Deb Richard. Tschetter also took part in a playoff at the 1997 State Farm Rail Classic. She and Lori Kane losing to Cindy Figg-Currier on the first hole of sudden death.

Tschetter twice finished second in major championships. The first of which was the 1996 U.S. Women's Open where she finished six shots behind Annika Sörenstam. In addition, at the 1997 Nabisco Dinah Shore she finished two strokes behind Betsy King.

== Personal life ==
Tschetter was married to Kirk Lucas, her coach, and they have two daughters, Lainey and Kyra.

She founded the Kris Tschetter Celebrity Golf Benefit for Kids in 1991, an event that raises money for children’s charities in the Sioux Falls, South Dakota area. While on Tour, she has represented the Liz Claiborne clothing for 11 straight years and since its inception in 1999, Private Club Links.

== Awards and honors ==
While at Texas Christian University (TCU), Tschetter was a three-time member of the All-Southwest Conference Team.

== Professional wins (3) ==
=== LPGA Tour wins (1) ===
No.	Date	Tournament	Winning score	Margin of victory	Runner-up
1	Aug 23, 1992	Northgate Computer Classic	−5 (69-69-73=211)	3 strokes	(United States) Deb Richard

LPGA Tour playoff record (0–1)

No.	Year	Tournament	Opponents	Result
1	1997	State Farm Rail Classic	(United States) Cindy Figg-Currier (Canada) Lorie Kane	Figg-Currier won with birdie on first extra hole

=== Other wins (1) ===
- 1991 JCPenney Classic (with Billy Andrade)

=== Legends Tour wins (1) ===
- 2015 Walgreens Charity Classic

== Results in LPGA majors ==
Tournament	1984	1985	1986	1987	1988	1989
Kraft Nabisco Championship						
LPGA Championship					T43	CUT
U.S. Women's Open	CUT					
du Maurier Classic					T57	CUT

Tournament	1990	1991	1992	1993	1994	1995	1996	1997	1998	1999	2000
Kraft Nabisco Championship			T8	T60	T32	T27	9	2	CUT	T13	T53
LPGA Championship		T37	T74	T11	T49	T18	T18	CUT	T30	T54	T46
U.S. Women's Open	T49	T15	T36	T17	T25	T13	2	CUT	T36	T40	
du Maurier Classic	T41		CUT	CUT	CUT	T12	T49	T16	T54	CUT	

Tournament	2001	2002	2003	2004	2005	2006	2007	2008	2009
Kraft Nabisco Championship		T14	CUT						
LPGA Championship	T39	T25	CUT	CUT	T63	CUT			T44
U.S. Women's Open	T30	T37		CUT	T52	CUT			CUT
Women's British Open ^	CUT	T37		CUT	T52	CUT			CUT

^ The Women's British Open replaced the du Maurier Classic as an LPGA major in 2001.

Top 10
Did not play

WD = withdrew
CUT = missed the halfway cut
"T" = tied

=== Summary ===
Tournament	Wins	2nd	3rd	Top-5	Top-10	Top-25	Events	Cuts made
Kraft Nabisco Championship	0	1	0	1	3	5	11	9
LPGA Championship	0	0	0	0	0	4	19	14
U.S. Women's Open	0	1	0	1	1	5	17	12
du Maurier Classic	0	0	0	0	0	2	11	6
Women's British Open	0	0	0	0	0	0	6	2
Totals	0	2	0	2	4	16	64	43

- Most consecutive cuts made – 9 (1995 Nabisco – 1997 Nabisco)
- Longest streak of top-10s – 1 (four times)

== U.S. national team appearances ==
Professional

- Handa Cup: 2015 (winners)

== Bibliography ==
- 2010 Mr. Hogan, the Man I Knew: An LPGA Player Looks Back on an Amazing Friendship and Lessons She Learned from Golf's Greatest Legend, ISBN 978-1592405459
