= Colleen Walker =

American professional golfer (1956–2012)

Personal information
- Full name: Colleen Walker
- Nationality: United States
- Born: August 16, 1956 Jacksonville, Florida, U.S.
- Died: December 11, 2012 (aged 56) Valrico, Florida, U.S.
- Height: 5 ft 5 in (1.65 m)

Career
- Sport: Golf
- College: Florida State University
- Turned professional: 1982
- Former tours: LPGA Tour (1982–2004); Legends Tour
- Professional wins: 12

Number of wins by tour
- LPGA Tour: 9
- LPGA of Japan Tour: 1
- Other: 2

Best results in LPGA major championships (wins: 1)
- Chevron Championship: 2nd: 1988
- Women's PGA C'ship: T15: 1991
- U.S. Women's Open: T3: 1988
- du Maurier Classic: Won: 1997
- Women's British Open: DNP

Achievements and awards
- LPGA Vare Trophy: 1988
- LPGA Heather Farr Player Award: 2004

Colleen Walker (August 16, 1956 – December 11, 2012) was an American professional golfer who played on the LPGA Tour.

== Amateur career ==
Walker was born in Jacksonville, Florida in 1956. She started playing golf at the age of 14. At the age of 18, she was named the 1974 Palm Beach Post Athlete and Player of the Year. She won the Florida All-State Golf Award in 1976.

Walker then attended Florida State University. She won most valuable player honors from 1977–1978.

== Professional career ==
In 1981, Walker turned professional. She played on the Tampa Bay Mini-Tour briefly.

Walker joined the LPGA Tour in 1982 after earning medalist honors at the LPGA Final Qualifying Tournament. She won nine tour titles, the first of which was in 1987. Her final victory was in 1997. That year she won her only major championship, the 1997 du Maurier Classic.

In 1988, she won the LPGA Vare Trophy for lowest scoring average, was named Most Improved Player by Golf Digest, and finished a career high fifth on the money list, one of four times she finished in the top ten.

== Illness and death ==
In 2001, Walker joined the Legends Tour. She won her first tournament that year. After being diagnosed with breast cancer in January 2003, she underwent chemotherapy and radiation. She would rejoin the tour in September. She finished in a tie for 10th at a senior event, essentially an attempt to see if she could still play. She retired from the Legends Tour in 2004.

Walker died on December 11, 2012, in Valrico, Florida, of a cancer recurrence that was diagnosed in late 2011. She was 56-years-old.

== Awards and honors ==
- In 1974, Walker earned the Palm Beach Post Athlete and Player of the Year.
- In 1976, she won the Florida All-State Golf Award.
- In 1988, Walker won the LPGA Vare Trophy, bestowed to the player with the lowest scoring average on the LPGA.
- In 1988, she earned the Most Improved Player award by Golf Digest.
- In 1991, she was inducted into the Florida State University Hall of Fame.
- In 2003, Walker was inducted into the Palm Beach County Sports Hall of Fame.
- In 2003, she earned the LPGA's Heather Farr Player Award.

== Professional wins (12) ==
=== LPGA Tour (9) ===
Legend
LPGA Tour major championships (1)
Other LPGA Tour (8)

No.	Date	Tournament	Winning score	Margin of victory	Runner(s)-up
1	Jun 14, 1987	Mayflower Classic	−10 (67-70-72-69=278)	1 stroke	(United States) Bonnie Lauer (United States) Sally Quinlan (United States) Patti Rizzo (United States) Patty Sheehan
2	Jul 17, 1988	Boston Five Classic	−14 (66-69-70-69=274)	8 strokes	(United States) Jane Geddes (United States) Patty Sheehan (Australia) Jan Stephenson (United States) Kathryn Young
3	Mar 18, 1990	Circle K LPGA Tucson Open	−12 (71-68-65-72=276)	5 strokes	(United States) Pat Bradley (United States) Heather Drew (United States) Betsy King (United States) Kate Rogerson
4	Jun 16, 1991	Lady Keystone Open	−9 (70-70-67=207)	2 strokes	(United States) Beth Daniel (United States) Kris Tschetter
5	Feb 2, 1992	Oldsmobile LPGA Classic	−9 (71-73-67-68=279)	Playoff	(Canada) Dawn Coe
6	May 24, 1992	LPGA Corning Classic	−12 (65-70-69-72=276)	5 strokes	(United States) Beth Daniel (United States) Alice Miller
7	Sep 20, 1992	Safeco Classic	−11 (72-67-68-70=277)	2 strokes	(United States) Vicki Fergon (United States) Rosie Jones
8	Aug 3, 1997	du Maurier Classic	−14 (68-72-73-65=278)	2 strokes	(Sweden) Liselotte Neumann
9	Sep 20, 1997	Star Bank LPGA Classic	−13 (67-69-67=203)	2 strokes	(United States) Terry-Jo Myers

LPGA Tour playoff record (1–0)

No.	Year	Tournament	Opponent	Result
1	1992	Oldsmobile LPGA Classic	(Canada) Dawn Coe	Won with par on first extra hole

=== LPGA of Japan Tour (1) ===
- 1989 Nichirei International

=== Legends Tour (1) ===
- 2001 Hy-Vee Classic

=== Other (1) ===
- 1988 Mazda Champions (with Dave Hill)

== Major championships ==
=== Wins (1) ===
Year	Championship	Winning score	Margin	Runner-up
1997	du Maurier Classic	−14 (68-72-73-65=278)	2 strokes	(Sweden) Liselotte Neumann

== Team appearances ==
Professional

- Handa Cup (representing the United States): 2009 (winners)
