= 1992 U.S. Women's Open =

Coordinates: 40.526°N 79.827°W

Tournament information
- Dates: July 23–27, 1992
- Location: Oakmont, Pennsylvania
- Course: Oakmont Country Club
- Organized by: USGA
- Tour: LPGA Tour

Statistics
- Par: 71
- Length: 6,312 yards (5,772 m)
- Field: 156 players, 66 after cut
- Cut: 151 (+9)
- Prize fund: $700,000
- Winner's share: $130,000

Champion
- (United States) Patty Sheehan
- 280 (−4), playoff

Location in the United States
Location in Pennsylvania

The 1992 U.S. Women's Open was the 47th U.S. Women's Open, held July 23–27 at Oakmont Country Club in Oakmont, Pennsylvania, a suburb northeast of Pittsburgh.

The champion was Patty Sheehan, the winner of an 18-hole Monday playoff over runner-up Juli Inkster, 72 to 74. Tied for the lead after the third round at 211 (−2) on the par-71 course, both players shot 69 in the fourth round to finish at 280 (−4) for the championship, four strokes ahead of third-place finisher Donna Andrews. Rain delays during the first two rounds extended play to the following day.

The site of many U.S. Opens, PGA Championships, and U.S. Amateurs, this was the first U.S. Women's Open and women's major at Oakmont. The course was set at 6,312 yards (5,772 m), at the time, the second-longest in U.S. Women's Open history. The championship returned to Oakmont in 2010, won by Paula Creamer.

This was the first U.S. Women's Open for Annika Sörenstam, then a 21-year-old amateur; she made the cut on the number at 151 (+9) and finished with 308 (+24), tied for 64th.

This championship coincided with the opening weekend of the 1992 Summer Olympics in Barcelona, Spain.

== Round summaries ==
=== First round ===
Thursday, July 23, 1992
Friday, July 24, 1992

Place	Player	Score	To par
T1	(United States) Donna Andrews	69	−2
T1	(United States) Tracy Kerdyk	69	−2
T1	(United States) Nancy Ramsbottom	69	−2
T1	(United States) Muffin Spencer-Devlin	69	−2
T1	(United States) Patty Sheehan	69	−2
T6	(United States) Dottie Pepper	70	−1
T6	(United States) Kris Tschetter	70	−1
T6	(Scotland) Pamela Wright	70	−1
T9	(United States) Amy Alcott	71	E
T9	(Sweden) Helen Alfredsson	71	E
T9	(Canada) Dawn Coe	71	E
T9	(United States) Dale Eggeling	71	E
T9	(United States) Christa Johnson	71	E

=== Second round ===
Friday, July 24, 1992
Saturday, July 25, 1992

Place	Player	Score	To par
1	(Scotland) Pamela Wright	70-69=139	−3
2	(United States) Juli Inkster	72-68=140	−2
3	(United States) Patty Sheehan	69-72=141	−1
T4	(United States) Donna Andrews	69-73=142	E
T4	(Canada) Dawn Coe	71-71=142	E
T6	(United States) Jane Geddes	73-70=143	+1
T6	(Canada) Gail Graham	72-71=143	+1
T6	(United States) Alice Ritzman	74-69=143	+1
T9	(United States) Amy Benz	73-71=144	+2
T9	(United States) Dottie Pepper	70-74=144	+2
T9	(United States) Nancy Ramsbottom	69-75=144	+2
T9	(United States) Kris Tschetter	70-74=144	+2

=== Third round ===
Saturday, July 25, 1992

Place	Player	Score	To par
T1	(United States) Patty Sheehan	69-72-70=211	−2
T1	(United States) Juli Inkster	72-68-71=211	−2
T3	(United States) Donna Andrews	69-73-72=214	+1
T3	(Canada) Dawn Coe	71-71-72=214	+1
T3	(Canada) Gail Graham	72-71-71=214	+1
T6	(United States) Michelle McGann	72-73-70=215	+2
T6	(Scotland) Pamela Wright	70-69-76=215	+2
8	(United States) Dottie Pepper	70-74-72=216	+3
T9	(United States) Amy Benz	73-71-73=217	+4
T9	(United States) Meg Mallon	73-72-72=217	+4

=== Final round ===
Sunday, July 26, 1992

Place	Player	Score	To par	Money ($)
T1	(United States) Patty Sheehan	69-72-70-69=280	−4	Playoff
T1	(United States) Juli Inkster	72-68-71-69=280	−4	Playoff
3	(United States) Donna Andrews	69-73-72-70=284	E	38,830
4	(United States) Meg Mallon	73-72-72-70=287	+3	28,336
5	(Canada) Dawn Coe	71-71-72-74=288	+4	22,295
T6	(United States) Dottie Pepper	70-74-72-73=289	+5	17,472
T6	(Canada) Gail Graham	72-71-71-75=289	+5	17,472
T6	(United States) Michelle McGann	72-73-70-74=289	+5	17,472
T9	(United States) Jane Geddes	73-70-78-70=291	+7	13,372
T9	(Scotland) Pamela Wright	70-69-76-76=291	+7	13,372
T9	(United States) Tammie Green	73-75-70-73=291	+7	13,372

=== Playoff ===
Monday, July 27, 1992

Place	Player	Score	To par	Money ($)
1	(United States) Patty Sheehan	35-37=72	+1	130,000
2	(United States) Juli Inkster	37-37=74	+3	65,000

==== Scorecard ====
Hole	1	2	3	4	5	6	7	8	9	10	11	12	13	14	15	16	17	18
Par	4	4	4	5	4	3	4	3	5	4	4	5	3	4	4	3	4	4
(United States) Sheehan	−1	−1	−1	−1	−1	−1	−1	−1	−1	−1	E	E	−1	−1	−1	−1	E	+1
(United States) Inkster	E	E	E	E	E	E	+1	+1	+1	+2	+2	+2	+2	+3	+3	+4	+3	+3
