= Rainbow Foods LPGA Classic =

Golf tournament formerly on the LPGA Tour

The Rainbow Foods LPGA Classic was a golf tournament on the LPGA Tour from 1990 to 1998. It was played in the Minneapolis – Saint Paul, Minnesota area: at the Edinburgh USA Golf Course in Brooklyn Park from 1990 to 1996 and at the Rush Creek Golf Club in Maple Grove in 1997 and 1998.

== Winners ==
Rainbow Foods LPGA Classic

- 1998 Hiromi Kobayashi

First Bank Presents the Edina Realty LPGA Classic

- 1997 Danielle Ammaccapane
- 1996 Liselotte Neumann
- 1995 Julie Larsen

Minnesota LPGA Classic

- 1994 Liselotte Neumann
- 1993 Hiromi Kobayashi

Northgate Computer Classic

- 1992 Kris Tschetter
- 1991 Cindy Rarick

Northgate Classic

- 1990 Beth Daniel
