= Shirley Furlong =

American professional golfer (born 1959)

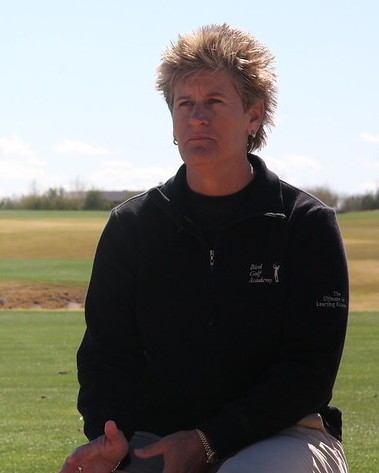
- Furlong in 2009

Personal information
- Nationality: United States
- Born: December 5, 1959 (age 66) San Antonio, Texas, U.S.
- Height: 5 ft 5 in (1.65 m)

Career
- Sport: Golf
- College: Texas A&M University
- Status: Professional
- Former tours: LPGA Tour (1985–1998); Futures Tour
- Professional wins: 2

Number of wins by tour
- LPGA Tour: 1
- Epson Tour: 1

Best results in LPGA major championships
- Chevron Championship: T2: 1990
- Women's PGA C'ship: T5: 1996
- U.S. Women's Open: T20: 1989
- du Maurier Classic: T4: 1987

Shirley Furlong (born December 5, 1959) is an American professional golfer. She played on the LPGA Tour.

== Career ==
Furlong won once on the LPGA Tour in 1988.

== Professional wins (2) ==
=== LPGA Tour wins (1) ===
No.	Date	Tournament	Winning score	Margin of victory	Runner-up
1	Jul 19, 1988	Lady Keystone Open	–11 (68-72-65=205)	Playoff	(United States) Sherri Turner

LPGA Tour playoff record (1–0)

No.	Year	Tournament	Opponent	Result
1	1988	Lady Keystone Open	(United States) Sherri Turner	Won with par on first extra hole

=== Futures Tour wins (1) ===
- 1984 Seven Springs Classic
