= Mercury Titleholders Championship =

Golf tournament formerly on the LPGA Tour

The Mercury Titleholders Championship was a golf tournament on the LPGA Tour from 1990 to 1999. It was played at three different courses in Florida. The event was separate from the Titleholders Championship, a former major championship on the LPGA Tour, and also from the CME Group Titleholders, which will become the final official event of the LPGA season starting in 2011.

== Tournament locations ==
Years	Venue	Location
1990–93	Killearn Country Club	Tallahassee, Florida
1994	Indigo Lakes Golf & Tennis Resort	Daytona Beach, Florida
1995–99	LPGA International	Daytona Beach, Florida

== Winners ==
Mercury Titleholders Championship

- 1999 Karrie Webb
- 1998 Danielle Ammaccapane

Sprint Titleholders Championship

- 1997 Tammie Green
- 1996 Karrie Webb

Sprint Championship

- 1995 Val Skinner
- 1994 Sherri Steinhauer

Sprint Classic

- 1993 Kristi Albers

Centel Classic

- 1992 Danielle Ammaccapane
- 1991 Pat Bradley
- 1990 Beth Daniel

== See also ==
- Centel Classic, a PGA Tour event also played at Killearn Country Club (1969–89)
