= Betsy King =

American professional golfer (born 1955)

Personal information
- Nationality: United States
- Born: August 13, 1955 (age 71) Reading, Pennsylvania, U.S.
- Height: 5 ft 6 in (1.68 m)

Career
- Sport: Golf
- College: Furman University
- Turned professional: 1977
- Former tour: LPGA Tour (1977–2005)
- Professional wins: 39

Number of wins by tour
- LPGA Tour: 34
- Ladies European Tour: 1
- LPGA of Japan Tour: 3
- Other: 3

Best results in LPGA major championships (wins: 6)
- Chevron Championship: Won: 1987, 1990, 1997
- Women's PGA C'ship: Won: 1992
- U.S. Women's Open: Won: 1989, 1990
- du Maurier Classic: 2nd/T2: 1989, 1993
- Women's British Open: 59th: 2002

Achievements and awards
- World Golf Hall of Fame: 1995 (member page)
- LPGA Tour Money Winner: 1984, 1989, 1993
- LPGA Tour Player of the Year: 1984, 1989, 1993
- LPGA Vare Trophy: 1987, 1993
- GWAA Female Player of the Year: 1987, 1989
- Best Female Golfer ESPY Award: 1994
- LPGA William and Mousie Powell Award: 1996
- Silver Anniversary Awards (NCAA): 2002

Betsy King was also a childhood name for Lizzie Lloyd King.

Betsy King (born August 13, 1955) is an American professional golfer. She became a member of the LPGA Tour in 1977 and won six major championships and 34 LPGA Tour victories in all.

== Early life, college and amateur career ==
King was born on born August 13, 1955, in Reading, Pennsylvania. She graduated from Exeter Township High School in 1973. She played collegiately at Furman University, and was on the 1976 national championship team that included future LPGA players Beth Daniel, Sherri Turner and Cindy Ferro. She was low amateur at the 1976 U.S. Women's Open.

== Professional career ==
King joined the LPGA Tour in 1977. She won her first tournament at the 1984 Women's Kemper Open. She won three titles in 1984, and added 21 top-10 finishes to earn LPGA Tour Player of the Year honors. From 1984 through 1989, she won a total of 20 LPGA events, more wins than any other golfer in the world, male or female, during that time period.

After that first win in 1984, King won at least once each of the next 10 years, with a high of six victories in 1989. She finished in the top-10 on the money list every year from 1985–1995, and again in 1997. Along the way, she was named Player of the Year three times, won two scoring titles and three money titles. In 1993, she won a scoring title and the money title, but only one tournament. She finished second five times, including at two majors. She averaged a major a year from 1987 to 1992, then won a sixth major in 1997. The last of her 34 LPGA wins came in 2001. With her 30th win in 1995, she gained entry into the World Golf Hall of Fame.

From 1996 to 2004, there was an event on Tour, the Wachovia LPGA Classic, hosted by King. She was also a worker for charitable causes, organizing Habitat for Humanity house building projects and working in former Soviet bloc countries with orphan relief agencies. She played for the United States in the Solheim Cup five times (1990, 1992, 1994, 1996, 1998) and was the captain of the 2007 United States team. She led the team to a 16–12 win over Europe in the 2007 Solheim Cup held in Halmstad, Sweden between September 14 and 16, 2007. In 2001, she was inducted into the National Polish-American Sports Hall of Fame.

== Professional wins (39) ==
=== LPGA Tour (34) ===
Legend
LPGA Tour major championships (6)
Other LPGA Tour (26)

No.	Date	Tournament	Winning score	Margin of victory	Runner(s)-up
1	Mar 25, 1984	Women's Kemper Open	−9 (71-72-73-73=289)	3 strokes	(United States) Pat Bradley
2	Apr 29, 1984	Freedom/Orlando Classic	−14 (69-67-66=202)	2 strokes	(United States) Alice Miller
3	Aug 26, 1984	Columbia Savings Classic	−7 (72-70-67-72=281)	1 stroke	(United States) Muffin Spencer-Devlin
4	Mar 3, 1985	Samaritan Turquoise Classic	−8 (69-68-72-71=280)	Playoff	(United States) Patty Sheehan
5	Sep 2, 1985	Rail Charity Classic	−11 (65-73-67=205)	2 strokes	(United States) Janet Anderson
6	Aug 10, 1986	Henredon Classic	−11 (70-67-70-70=277)	Playoff	(United States) JoAnne Carner
7	Sep 1, 1986	Rail Charity Classic	−11 (70-72-63=205)	Playoff	(United States) Cathy Gerring (United States) Alice Ritzman
8	Mar 22, 1987	Circle K Tucson Open	−7 (70-71-72-68=281)	2 strokes	(Australia) Jan Stephenson
9	Apr 5, 1987	**Nabisco Dinah Shore**	−5 (68-75-72-68=283)	Playoff	(United States) Patty Sheehan
10	Jun 7, 1987	McDonald's Championship	−6 (72-68-71-67=278)	2 strokes	(Japan) Ayako Okamoto
11	Aug 23, 1987	Atlantic City LPGA Classic	−6 (70-71-66=207)	3 strokes	(United States) Nancy Lopez
12	Mar 6, 1988	Women's Kemper Open	−8 (73-72-66-69=280)	1 stroke	(United States) Beth Daniel
13	Sep 5, 1988	Rail Charity Golf Classic	−9 (68-68-71=207)	2 strokes	(United States) Margaret Ward
14	Sep 11, 1988	Cellular One-Ping Golf Championship	−3 (71-70-72=213)	1 stroke	(United States) Colleen Walker
15	Jan 15, 1989	The Jamaica Classic	−11 (64-68-70=202)	1 stroke	(United States) Nancy Lopez
16	Feb 26, 1989	Women's Kemper Open	−14 (63-72-67=202)	2 strokes	(United States) Jane Geddes
17	Apr 23, 1989	USX Golf Classic	−13 (67-70-72-66=275)	Playoff	(United States) Lynn Adams
18	Jun 25, 1989	McDonald's Championship	−16 (69-65-71-67=272)	2 strokes	(United States) Pat Bradley (United States) Shirley Furlong
19	Jul 16, 1989	**U.S. Women's Open**	−6 (67-71-72-68=278)	4 strokes	(United States) Nancy Lopez
20	Aug 27, 1989	Nestle World Championship	−13 (66-71-70-68=275)	1 stroke	(United States) Pat Bradley (United States) Patty Sheehan
21	Apr 1, 1990	**Nabisco Dinah Shore**	−5 (69-70-69-75=283)	2 strokes	(United States) Shirley Furlong (United States) Kathy Postlewait
22	Jul 15, 1990	**U.S. Women's Open**	−4 (72-71-71-70=284)	1 stroke	(United States) Patty Sheehan
23	Aug 19, 1990	JAL Big Apple Classic	−15 (75-67-63-68=273)	3 strokes	(United States) Beth Daniel
24	May 26, 1991	LPGA Corning Classic	−15 (69-73-65-66=273)	6 strokes	(United States) Deb Richard
25	Jul 21, 1991	JAL Big Apple Classic	−9 (73-66-67-73=279)	1 stroke	(Japan) Ayako Okamoto
26	May 17, 1992	**Mazda LPGA Championship**	−17 (68-66-67-66=267)	11 strokes	(United States) JoAnne Carner (Sweden) Liselotte Neumann (United States) Karen Noble
27	Jul 12, 1992	The Phar-Mor in Youngstown	−7 (71-67-71=209)	Playoff	(United States) Donna Andrews (United States) Beth Daniel (United States) Meg Mallon
28	Nov 8, 1992	Mazda Japan Classic^{1}	−11 (66-72-67=205)	Playoff	(Sweden) Helen Alfredsson
29	Nov 7, 1993	Toray Japan Queens Cup^{1}	−11 (68-70-67=205)	1 stroke	(United States) Jane Geddes
30	Jun 25, 1995	ShopRite LPGA Classic	−9 (66-71-67=204)	2 strokes	(United States) Beth Daniel (United States) Rosie Jones
31	Mar 30, 1997	**Nabisco Dinah Shore**	−12 (71-67-67-71=276)	2 strokes	(United States) Kris Tschetter
32	Feb 19, 2000	Cup Noodles Hawaiian Ladies Open	−12 (67-67-70=204)	2 strokes	(United States) Brandie Burton
33	May 28, 2000	LPGA Corning Classic	−12 (69-68-69-70=276)	Playoff	(United States) Vicki Goetze-Ackerman (United States) Kelli Kuehne
34	Jul 1, 2001	ShopRite LPGA Classic	−12 (65-69-67=201)	2 strokes	(Canada) Lorie Kane

^{1}Co-sanctioned by the LPGA of Japan Tour

LPGA Tour playoff record (8–6)

No.	Year	Tournament	Opponent(s)	Result
1	1979	Wheeling Classic	(United States) Debbie Massey	Lost to par on first extra hole
2	1985	Samaritan Turquoise Classic	(United States) Patty Sheehan	Won with eagle on first extra hole
3	1986	Henredon Classic	(United States) JoAnne Carner	Won with par on second extra hole
4	1986	Rail Charity Classic	(United States) Cathy Gerring (United States) Alice Ritzman	Won with birdie on second extra hole
5	1986	Konica San Jose Classic	(United States) Amy Alcott (Japan) Ayako Okamoto (United States) Patty Sheehan	Sheehan won with birdie on first extra hole
6	1987	Mazda Classic	(United States) Kathy Postlewait	Lost to par on first extra hole
7	1987	**Nabisco Dinah Shore**	(United States) Patty Sheehan	Won with par on second extra hole
8	1988	Crestar Classic	(United States) Juli Inkster (United States) Rosie Jones (United States) Nancy Lopez	Inkster won with eagle on first extra hole
9	1989	USX Golf Classic	(United States) Lynn Adams	Won with birdie on first extra hole
10	1992	The Phar-Mor in Youngstown	(United States) Donna Andrews (United States) Beth Daniel (United States) Meg Mallon	Won with birdie on first extra hole
11	1992	Mazda Japan Classic	(Sweden) Helen Alfredsson	Won with birdie on fourth extra hole
12	1993	**du Maurier Ltd. Classic**	(United States) Brandie Burton	Lost to birdie on first extra hole
13	1994	Toray Japan Queens Cup	(South Korea) Woo-Soon Ko	Lost to par on first extra hole
14	2000	LPGA Corning Classic	(United States) Vicki Goetze-Ackerman (United States) Kelli Kuehne	Won with birdie on second extra hole

LPGA majors are shown in bold.

=== Ladies European Tour (1) ===
- 1985 Burberry Women's British Open

Note: King won the Women's British Open once before it became co-sanctioned by the LPGA Tour in 1994 and recognized as a major championship by the LPGA Tour in 2001

=== LPGA of Japan Tour (3) ===
- 1981 Ajinomoto-Itsuki Charity Classic
- 1992 Mazda Japan Classic^{1}
- 1993 Toray Japan Queens Cup^{1}

^{1}Co-sanctioned by the LPGA Tour

=== Legends Tour (1) ===
- 2013 Fry's Desert Golf Classic (with Jane Crafter)

=== Other (3) ===
- 1990 Itoman LPGA World Match Play Championship
- 1993 JCPenney/LPGA Skins Game

== Major championships ==
=== Wins (6) ===
Year	championship	Winning score	Margin	Runner(s)-up
1987	Nabisco Dinah Shore	−5 (68-75-72-68=283)	Playoff^{1}	(United States) Patty Sheehan
1989	U.S. Women's Open	−4 (67-71-72-68=278)	4 stroke	(United States) Nancy Lopez
1990	Nabisco Dinah Shore	−5 (69-70-69-75=283)	2 strokes	(United States) Shirley Furlong, (United States) Kathy Postlewait
1990	U.S. Women's Open	−4 (72-71-71-70=284)	1 stroke	(United States) Patty Sheehan
1992	Mazda LPGA Championship	−17 (68-66-67-66=267)	11 strokes	(United States) JoAnne Carner, (Sweden) Liselotte Neumann, (United States) Karen Noble
1997	Nabisco Dinah Shore	−12 (71-67-67-71=276)	2 strokes	(United States) Kris Tschetter

^{1} Won on second extra hole with a par

=== Results timeline ===
Tournament	1976	1977	1978	1979	1980
LPGA Championship			T49	CUT	T27
U.S. Women's Open	T8	CUT	T20	CUT	CUT
du Maurier Classic	–	–	–	T26	

Tournament	1981	1982	1983	1984	1985	1986	1987	1988	1989	1990
Kraft Nabisco Championship	–	–	T52	T24	T7	4	1	T35	T4	1
LPGA Championship	T38	T21	T11	T7	T44	CUT	2	T24	T8	T5
U.S. Women's Open	T21	T25	T32	T5	T8	T3	T4	T12	1	1
du Maurier Classic	T38	T12	T25	3	CUT	T3	7	T19	T2	T10

Tournament	1991	1992	1993	1994	1995	1996	1997	1998	1999	2000
Kraft Nabisco Championship	T11	56	T2	T48	T11	CUT	1	T61	77	CUT
LPGA Championship	7	1	T4	T17	T11	T14	T53	T37	T69	T23
U.S. Women's Open	T28	T16	T7	T6	T3	CUT	T28	CUT	T47	T46
du Maurier Classic	T6	T28	2	T4	T5	CUT	T3	3		T23

Tournament	2001	2002	2003	2004	2005	2006	2007	2008	2009	2010	2011
Kraft Nabisco Championship	74	T36	T28	T58	T62						
LPGA Championship	T54	T47	CUT	T17	CUT						
U.S. Women's Open	CUT	CUT	CUT	CUT							CUT
Women's British Open ^		59	CUT	T60							

^ The Women's British Open replaced the du Maurier Classic as an LPGA major in 2001.

Win
Top 10
Did not play

CUT = missed the half-way cut.
WD = withdrew
"T" = tied

=== Summary ===
Tournament	Wins	2nd	3rd	Top-5	Top-10	Top-25	Events	Cuts made
Kraft Nabisco Championship	3	1	0	6	7	10	23	21
LPGA Championship	1	1	0	4	7	15	28	24
U.S. Women's Open	2	0	2	6	10	15	30	20
du Maurier Classic	0	2	4	8	11	15	20	18
Women's British Open	0	0	0	0	0	0	3	2
Totals	6	4	6	24	35	55	104	85

- Most consecutive cuts made – 38 (1986 U.S. Open – 1995 du Maurier Classic)
- Longest streak of top-10s – 8 (1989 Nabisco – 1990 LPGA)

== Team appearances ==
Professional

- Solheim Cup (representing the United States): 1990 (winners), 1992, 1994 (winners), 1996 (winners), 1998 (winners), 2007 (non-playing captain, winners)
- Handa Cup (representing the United States): 2012 (tie, Cup retained), 2013

== See also ==
- List of golfers with most LPGA Tour wins
- List of golfers with most LPGA major championship wins
