= Lady Keystone Open =

Golf tournament formerly on the LPGA Tour

The Lady Keystone Open was a golf tournament on the LPGA Tour from 1975 to 1994. In its first year it was a satellite tour event but became a full event in 1976. It was played at three different courses in southcentral Pennsylvania but mainly at the Hershey Country Club in Hershey, Pennsylvania.

== Tournament hosts ==
Years	Venue	City
1975–1976	Sportsman's Golf Course	Harrisburg, Pennsylvania
1977	Armitage Golf Club	Mechanicsburg, Pennsylvania
1978–1994	Hershey Country Club (West Course)	Hershey, Pennsylvania

== Winners ==
- 1994 Elaine Crosby
- 1993 Val Skinner
- 1992 Danielle Ammaccapane
- 1991 Colleen Walker
- 1990 Cathy Gerring
- 1989 Laura Davies
- 1988 Shirley Furlong
- 1987 Ayako Okamoto
- 1986 Juli Inkster
- 1985 Juli Inkster
- 1984 Amy Alcott
- 1983 Jan Stephenson
- 1982 Jan Stephenson
- 1981 JoAnne Carner
- 1980 JoAnne Carner
- 1979 Nancy Lopez
- 1978 Pat Bradley
- 1977 Sandra Spuzich
- 1976 Susie Berning
- 1975 Susie Berning (as satellite event)
