= Sara Lee Classic =

Golf tournament formerly on the LPGA Tour

The Sara Lee Classic was a golf tournament on the LPGA Tour from 1988 to 2002. It was played at Hermitage Golf Course in Old Hickory, Tennessee from 1988 to 1999. In 2000, the tournament moved to the Legends Club of Tennessee in Franklin, Tennessee and changed its name to the Electrolux USA Championship. The tournament was hosted by singers Vince Gill and Amy Grant in its final three years.

== Winners ==
Aerus Electrolux USA Championship Hosted by Vince Gill and Amy Grant

- 2002 Annika Sörenstam

Electrolux USA Championship Hosted by Vince Gill and Amy Grant

- 2001 Juli Inkster
- 2000 Pat Hurst

Sara Lee Classic

- 1999 Meg Mallon
- 1998 Barb Mucha
- 1997 Terry-Jo Myers
- 1996 Meg Mallon
- 1995 Michelle McGann
- 1994 Laura Davies
- 1993 Meg Mallon
- 1992 Maggie Will
- 1991 Nancy Lopez
- 1990 Ayako Okamoto
- 1989 Kathy Postlewait
- 1988 Patti Rizzo

== Tournament highlights ==
- 1988: The inaugural version of the tournament is decided in a sudden death playoff involving four players. Patti Rizzo birdies the fifth extra hole to defeat Sherri Turner after Tammie Green and Kim Williams had previously dropped out on the playoff's first hole.
- 1991: Nancy Lopez, pregnant with her third child, wins by two shots over Kris Monaghan.
- 1995: Michelle McGann wins on the LPGA Tour for the first time. She finished one shot ahead of defending champion Laura Davies.
- 2002: Annika Sörenstam wins the last edition of the tournament by shooting a final round 64 to finish one shot ahead of Pat Hurst. Hurst came to the tournament's final hole tied for the lead but hit a ball into the water leading to a bogey.

== 1992 fire ==
Three-time LPGA Tour winner Cathy Gerring suffered severe burns after finishing her second round of play in that year's Sara Lee Classic. Gerring was in a buffet line at a tournament hospitality tent when a catering employee Mike Singleton tried to restart a fire with denatured alcohol. Flames erupted, engulfing Gerring from the waist up. Gerring was immediately taken to a nearby burn unit.

Gerring did not play pro golf again until 1996, but never recovered her form. Three years after the accident, Gerring settled a lawsuit she filed against the catering company whose employee caused the fire to happen.
