= 1995 LPGA Tour =

Golf tour season

1995 LPGA Tour season
- Duration: January 12, 1995 – November 5, 1995
- Number of official events: 33
- Most wins: 3 (Sweden) Annika Sörenstam
- Money leader: (Sweden) Annika Sörenstam
- Player of the Year: (Sweden) Annika Sörenstam
- Vare Trophy: (Sweden) Annika Sörenstam
- Rookie of the Year: (United States) Pat Hurst

The 1995 LPGA Tour was the 46th season since the LPGA Tour officially began in 1950. The season ran from January 12 to November 5. The season consisted of 33 official money events. Annika Sörenstam won the most tournaments, three. She also led the money list with earnings of $666,533.

The season saw the first tournament in South Korea, the Samsung World Championship of Women's Golf. There were 12 first-time winners in 1995: Nanci Bowen, Gail Graham, Becky Iverson, Tracy Kerdyk, Julie Larsen, Jenny Lidback, Kathryn Marshall, Michelle McGann, Alison Nicholas, Annika Sörenstam, Barb Thomas, and Karrie Webb. Sörenstam went on to win 72 LPGA events in her career, the third most all-time.

The tournament results and award winners are listed below.

== Tournament results ==
The following table shows all the official money events for the 1995 season. "Date" is the ending date of the tournament. The numbers in parentheses after the winners' names are the number of wins they had on the tour up to and including that event. Majors are shown in bold.

Date	Tournament	Location	Winner	Score	Purse ($)	1st prize ($)
Jan 15	Chrysler-Plymouth Tournament of Champions	Florida	(Canada) Dawn Coe-Jones (3)	281 (−7)	700,000	115,000
Jan 22	HealthSouth Inaugural	Florida	(United States) Pat Bradley (31)	211 (−5)	450,000	67,500
Feb 18	Cup Noodles Hawaiian Ladies Open	Hawaii	(United States) Barb Thomas (1)	204 (−12)	550,000	82,500
Mar 12	Ping/Welch's Championship	Arizona	(United States) Dottie Mochrie (9)	278 (−10)	450,000	67,500
Mar 19	Standard Register PING	Arizona	(England) Laura Davies (10)	280 (−12)	700,000	105,000
Mar 26	**Nabisco Dinah Shore**	California	(United States) **Nanci Bowen (1)**	285 (−3)	850,000	127,500
Apr 16	Pinewild Women's Championship	North Carolina	(United States) Rosie Jones (6)	211 (−5)	650,000	97,500
Apr 23	Chick-fil-A Charity Championship	Georgia	(England) Laura Davies (11)	201 (−15)	500,000	75,000
Apr 30	Sprint Championship	Florida	(United States) Val Skinner (6)	273 (−15)	1,200,000	180,000
May 7	Sara Lee Classic	Tennessee	(United States) Michelle McGann (1)	202 (−14)	525,000	78,750
May 14	**McDonald's LPGA Championship**	Delaware	(United States) **Kelly Robbins (3)**	274 (−10)	1,200,000	180,000
May 21	Star Bank LPGA Classic	Ohio	(United States) Christa Johnson (7)	210 (−6)	500,000	75,000
May 28	LPGA Corning Classic	New York	(England) Alison Nicholas (1)	275 (−13)	550,000	82,500
Jun 4	Oldsmobile Classic	Michigan	(United States) Dale Eggeling (2)	274 (−14)	600,000	90,000
Jun 11	Edina Realty LPGA Classic	Minnesota	(United States) Julie Larsen (1)	205 (−11)	500,000	75,000
Jun 18	Rochester International	New York	(United States) Patty Sheehan (33)	278 (−10)	550,000	82,500
Jun 25	ShopRite LPGA Classic	New Jersey	(United States) Betsy King (30)	204 (−9)	650,000	97,500
Jul 2	Youngstown-Warren LPGA Classic	Ohio	(United States) Michelle McGann (2)	205 (−11)	550,000	82,500
Jul 9	Jamie Farr Toledo Classic	Ohio	(Scotland) Kathryn Marshall (1)	205 (−8)	500,000	75,000
Jul 16	**U.S. Women's Open**	Colorado	(Sweden) **Annika Sörenstam (1)**	278 (−2)	1,000,000	175,000
Jul 23	JAL Big Apple Classic	New York	(United States) Tracy Kerdyk (1)	273 (−11)	700,000	105,000
Jul 30	Friendly's Classic	Massachusetts	(United States) Becky Iverson (1)	276 (−12)	500,000	75,000
Aug 6	McCall's LPGA Classic	Vermont	(United States) Dottie Mochrie (10)	204 (−12)	500,000	75,000
Aug 13	PING/Welch's Championship	Massachusetts	(United States) Beth Daniel (32)	271 (−17)	450,000	67,500
Aug 20	Weetabix Women's British Open	England	(Australia) Karrie Webb (1*)	278 (−14)	600,000	92,400
Aug 27	**du Maurier Ltd. Classic**	Canada	(Peru) (Sweden) **Jenny Lidback (1)**	280 (−8)	1,000,000	150,000
Sep 4	State Farm Rail Classic	Illinois	(United States) Mary Beth Zimmerman (4)	206 (−10)	550,000	82,500
Sep 10	Ping-AT&T Wireless Services LPGA Golf Championship	Oregon	(England) Alison Nicholas (2)	207 (−9)	500,000	75,000
Sep 17	Safeco Classic	Washington	(United States) Patty Sheehan (34)	274 (−14)	500,000	75,000
Sep 24	GHP Heartland Classic	Missouri	(Sweden) Annika Sörenstam (2)	278 (−10)	525,000	78,750
Oct 1	Fieldcrest Cannon Classic	North Carolina	(Canada) Gail Graham (1)	273 (−15)	500,000	75,000
Oct 15	Samsung World Championship of Women's Golf	South Korea	(Sweden) Annika Sörenstam (3)	282 (−6)	475,000	117,500
Nov 5	Toray Japan Queens Cup	Japan	(South Korea) Woo-Soon Ko (2*)	207 (−9)	700,000	105,000

* – non-member at time of win

== Awards ==
Award	Winner	Country
Money winner	Annika Sörenstam	Sweden
Scoring leader (Vare Trophy)	Annika Sörenstam	Sweden
Player of the Year	Annika Sörenstam	Sweden
Rookie of the Year	Pat Hurst	United States
