= 1991 du Maurier Classic =

Coordinates: 49.251136°N 122.877497°W

The 1991 du Maurier Classic was contested from September 12–15 at Vancouver Golf Club. It was the 19th edition of the du Maurier Classic, and the 13th edition as a major championship on the LPGA Tour.

This event was won by Nancy Scranton.

== Final leaderboard ==
| Place | Player | Score | To par | Money (US$) |
|---|---|---|---|---|
| 1 | (United States) Nancy Scranton | 72-75-64-68=279 | −9 | 105,000 |
| 2 | (United States) Debbie Massey | 67-70-72-73=282 | −6 | 64,750 |
| T3 | (England) Laura Davies | 71-71-71-71=284 | −4 | 37,916 |
| T3 | (England) Trish Johnson | 67-71-73-73=284 | −4 | 37,916 |
| T3 | (Scotland) Pamela Wright | 72-69-69-74=284 | −4 | 37,916 |
| T6 | (Canada) Dawn Coe | 68-77-71-70=286 | −2 | 17,966 |
| T6 | (United States) Vicki Fergon | 72-72-72-70=286 | −2 | 17,966 |
| T6 | (United States) Rosie Jones | 71-71-69-75=286 | −2 | 17,966 |
| T6 | (United States) Betsy King | 71-71-72-72=286 | −2 | 17,966 |
| T6 | (England) Caroline McMillan | 70-73-71-72=286 | −2 | 17,966 |
| T6 | (United States) Dottie Pepper | 69-69-74-74=286 | −2 | 17,966 |
