= List of du Maurier Classic champions =

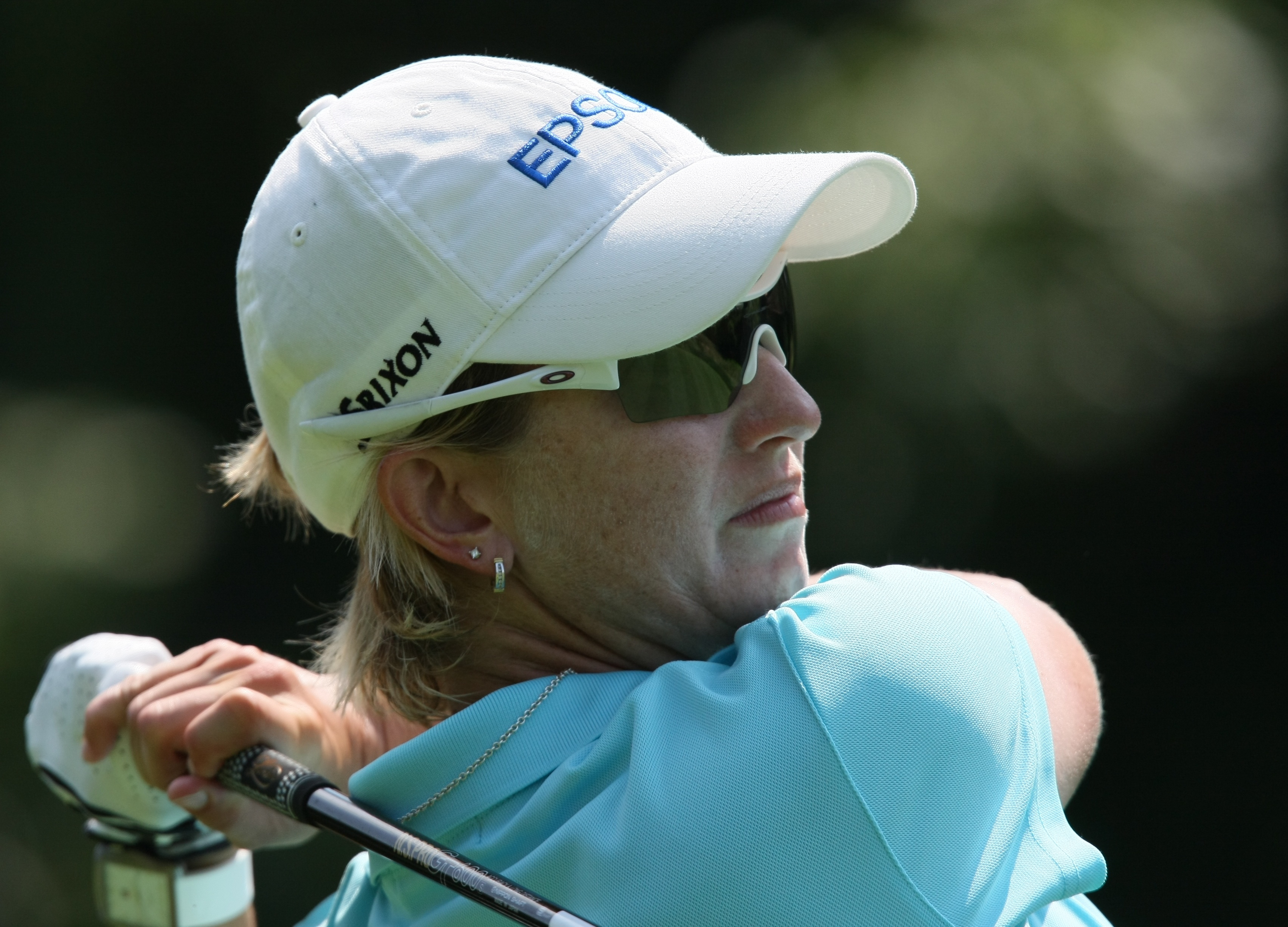
Karrie Webb is the 1999 Champion, which this was part of her career super-slam.

The du Maurier Classic^{[a]} was a women's major championship from 1979 till 2000, and is still a LPGA Tour golf tournament called the Canadian Women's Open, which has been in existence since 1973. This event has always conducted in stroke play competition by the Royal Canadian Golf Association (RCGA).

Pat Bradley holds the record for the most victories when the tournament was a major, with three, and Bradley had the most consecutive wins with two. The lowest under-par and aggregate score achieved while a major was Brandie Burton's 270 (–18) in 1998, which just happened to be her second duMaurier Classic win and only the second along with Bradley to ever accomplish the feat.

== Key ==
†	Tournament won in a playoff

== Champions ==
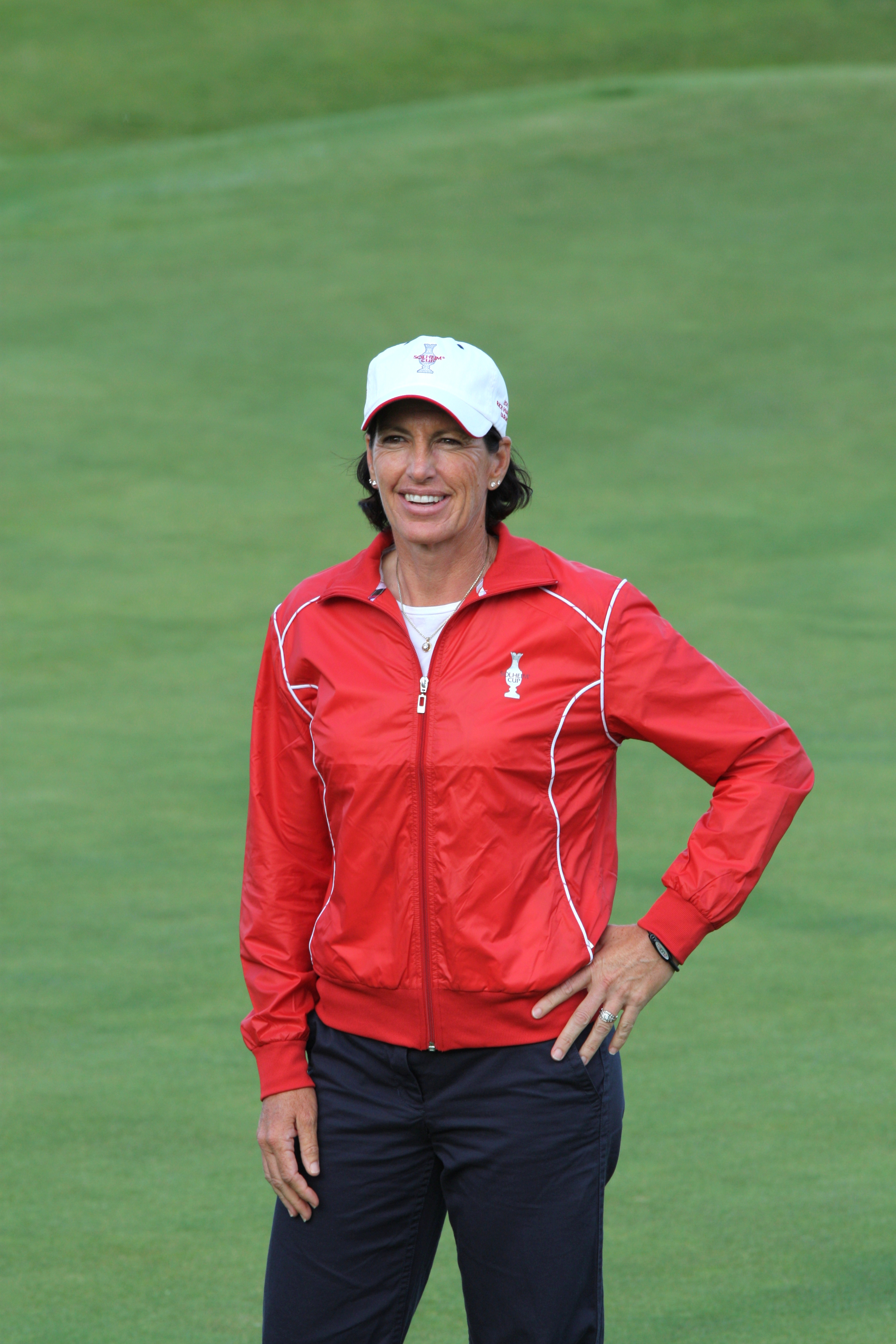
Juli Inkster is the 1984 Champion.

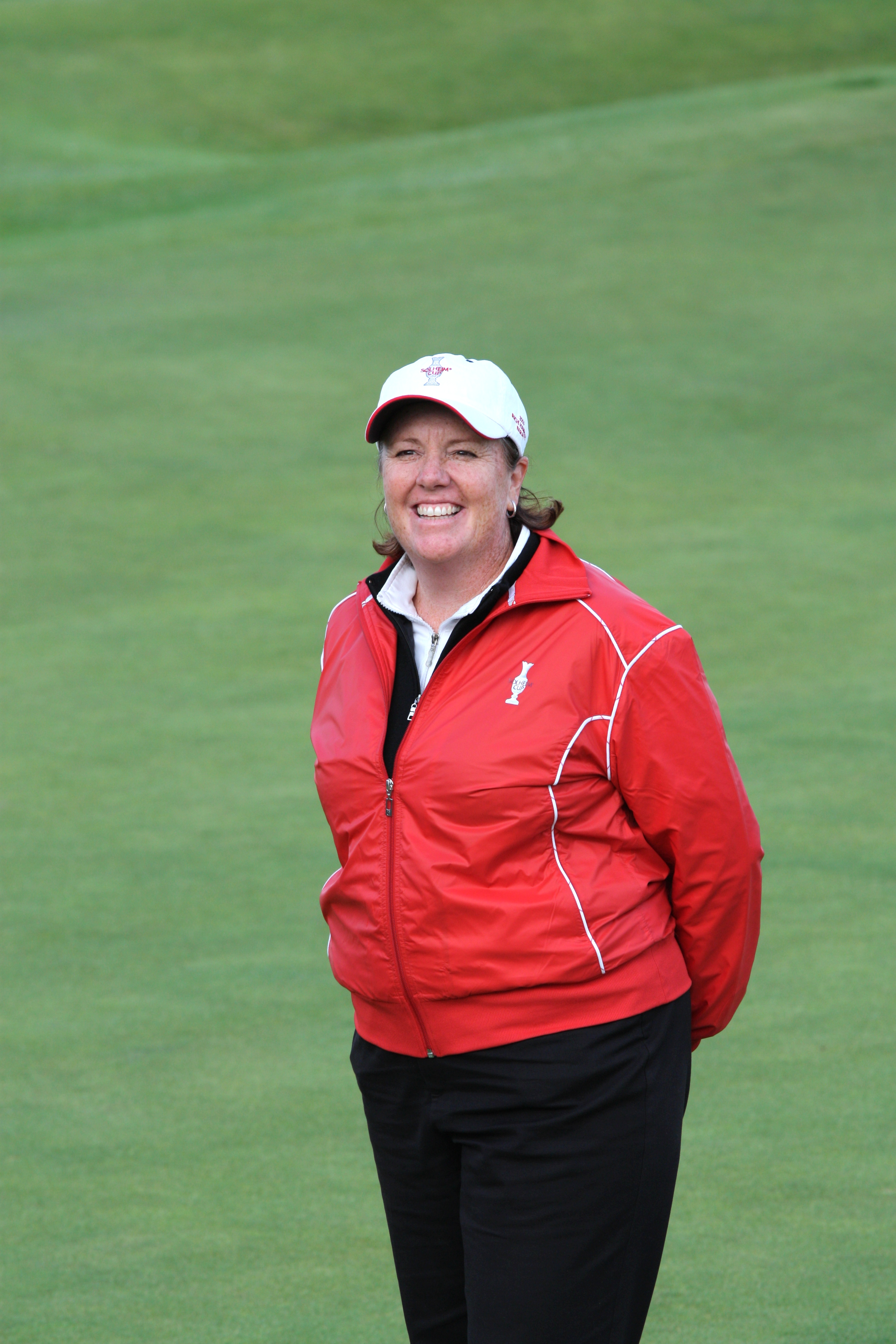
Meg Mallon is the 2000 Champion.

Year	Country	Champion	Course	Location	Total score	To par	Notes
1979	USA	Amy Alcott	Richelieu Valley Golf Club	Sainte-Julie, Quebec	285	-7	
1980	USA	Pat Bradley	St. George's Golf and Country Club	Toronto, Ontario	277	-15	
1981	AUS	Jan Stephenson	Summerlea Golf & Country Club	Dorion, Quebec	278	-10	
1982	USA	Sandra Haynie	St. George's Golf and Country Club	Toronto, Ontario	280	-8	
1983	USA	Hollis Stacy	Beaconsfield Golf Club	Pointe-Claire, Quebec	277	-11	
1984	USA	Juli Inkster	St. George's Golf and Country Club	Toronto, Ontario	279	-9	
1985	USA	Pat Bradley	Beaconsfield Golf Club	Pointe-Claire, Quebec	278	-10	
1986	USA	Pat Bradley †	Board of Trade Country Club	Woodbridge, Ontario	276	-12	^{[b]}
1987	USA	Jody Rosenthal	Islesmere Golf Club	Laval, Quebec	272	-16	
1988	USA	Sally Little	Vancouver Golf Club	Coquitlam, British Columbia	279	-9	
1989	USA	Tammie Green	Beaconsfield Golf Club	Pointe-Claire, Quebec	279	-9	
1990	USA	Cathy Johnston	Westmount Golf and Country Club	Kitchener, Ontario	276	-16	
1991	USA	Nancy Scranton	Vancouver Golf Club	Coquitlam, British Columbia	279	-9	
1992	USA	Sherri Steinhauer	St. Charles Country Club	Winnipeg, Manitoba	277	-11	
1993	USA	Brandie Burton †	London Hunt Club	London, Ontario	277	-11	^{[c]}
1994	USA	Martha Nause	Ottawa Hunt and Golf Club	Ottawa, Ontario	279	-9	
1995	PER; SWE	Jenny Lidback	Beaconsfield Golf Club	Pointe-Claire, Quebec	280	-8	
1996	ENG	Laura Davies	Edmonton Country Club	Edmonton, Alberta	277	-11	
1997	USA	Colleen Walker	Glen Abbey Golf Course	Oakville, Ontario	278	-14	
1998	USA	Brandie Burton	Essex Golf & Country Club	Windsor, Ontario	270	-18	
1999	AUS	Karrie Webb	Priddis Greens, Alberta Golf & Country Club	Calgary, Alberta	277	-11	
2000	USA	Meg Mallon	Royal Ottawa Golf Club	Aylmer, Quebec	282	-6	

== Multiple champions ==
This table lists the golfers who have won more than one du Maurier Classic as a major championship. Bolded years and player name indicates consecutive victories.

Grand Slam winners ‡

Country	Golfer	Total	Years
United States	**Pat Bradley** ‡	3	1980, **1985**, **1986**
United States	Brandie Burton	2	1993, 1998

== Champions by nationality ==
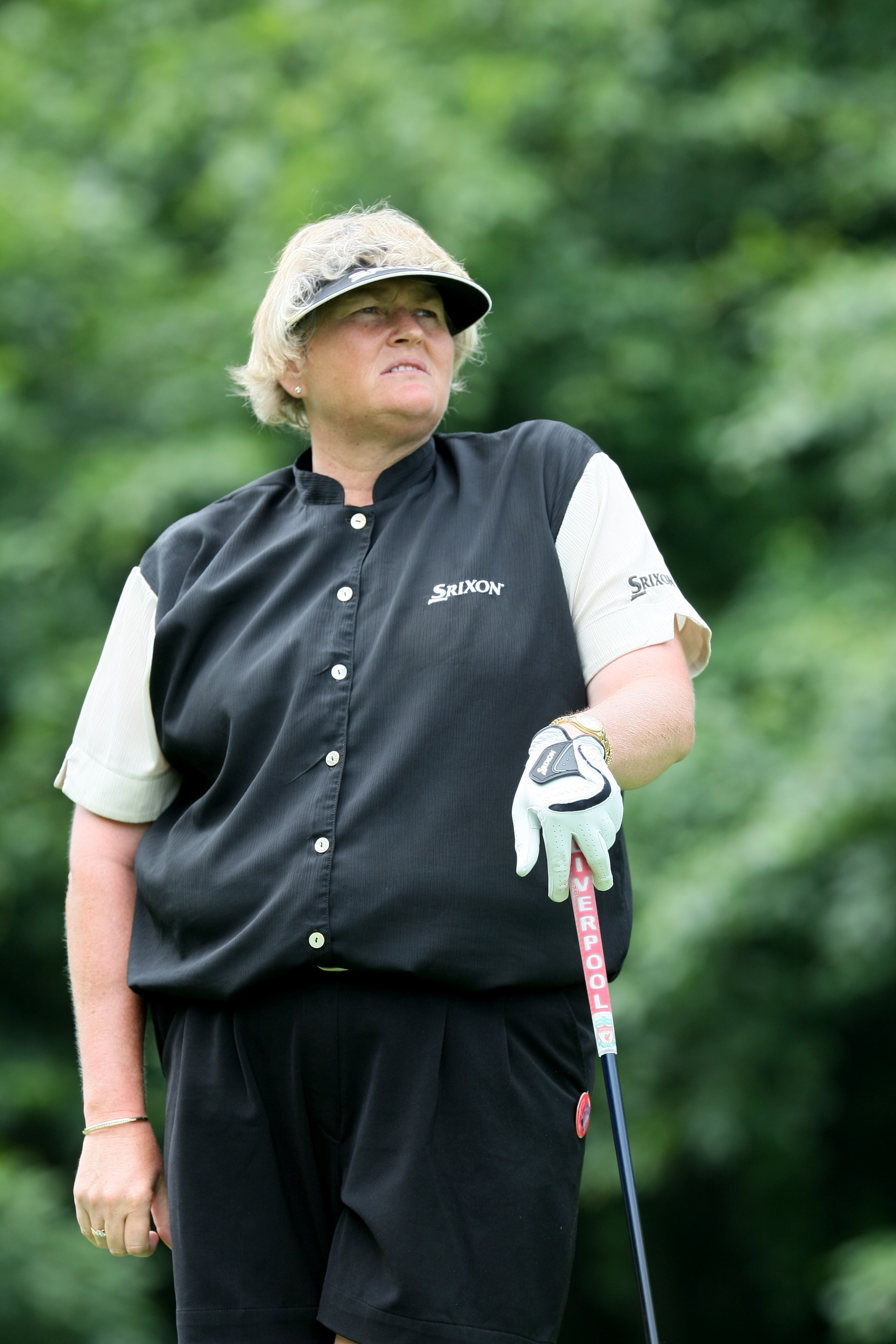
Laura Davies is the only European to win this event as a major championship in 1996.

This table lists the total number of titles won by golfers of each nationality as a major.

Rank	Nationality	Wins	Winners	First title	Last title
1	United States	18	15	1979	2000
2	Australia	2	2	1981	1999
T3	England	1	1	1996	
T3	Peru; Sweden	1	1	1995	

== Notes ==
- **^{a}** This tournament had two name changes, which are the following; 1979–1983 Peter Jackson Classic and 1984–2000 duMaurier Classic.
- **^{b}** Pat Bradley won in a sudden death playoff over Ayako Okamoto, 2-3.
- **^{c}** Brandie Burton won in a sudden death playoff over Betsy King, 3-4.

== See also ==
- Chronological list of LPGA major golf champions
- List of LPGA major championship winning golfers
- Grand Slam (golf)
