= 2015 Legends Tour =

The 2015 Legends Tour is a series of professional golf tour events for women aged 45 and older sanctioned by the Legends Tour. Based in the United States, it is an offshoot of the main U.S.-based women's tour, the LPGA Tour. The tour was founded in 2001, and is intended to allow women to prolong their competitive golf careers on the model of the successful Champions Tour for men.

== Schedule and results ==
The table below shows the schedule of events for the 2015 Legends Tour season. The number in brackets after each winner's name is the number of Legends Tour events she had won up to and including that tournament.

Date	Tournament	Location	Winner(s)
Mar 8	Walgreens Charity Classic	Arizona	(United States) Kris Tschetter (1)
Apr 19	Chico's Patty Berg Memorial	Florida	(United States) Laurie Rinker (4)
Aug 30	The Legends Championship	Indiana	(United States) Juli Inkster (1)
Sep 16	BJ's Charity Pro-Am (unofficial)	Massachusetts	(United States) Nanci Bowen (Plymouth CC) (United States) Nancy Scranton & (Australia) Jan Stephenson (Nicklaus course) (United States) Michelle McGann (Jones course)
Nov 7	Walgreens Charity Championship	Florida	(Sweden) Liselotte Neumann (2)
Nov 14	ISPS Handa Cup	Florida	(United States) Team USA
