= 1992 Nabisco Dinah Shore =

Coordinates: 33.798°N 116.433°W

Tournament information
- Dates: March 26–29, 1992
- Location: Rancho Mirage, California
- Courses: Mission Hills Country Club; Old Course (Dinah Shore Tourn. Course)
- Tour: LPGA Tour
- Format: Stroke play – 72 holes

Statistics
- Par: 72
- Length: 6,437 yards (5,886 m)
- Field: 108 players, 73 after cut
- Cut: 149 (+5)
- Prize fund: $700,000
- Winner's share: $105,000

Champion
- (United States) Dottie Pepper
- 279 (−9)

Location in the United States
Location in California

The 1992 Nabisco Dinah Shore was a women's professional golf tournament, held March 26–29 at Mission Hills Country Club in Rancho Mirage, California. This was the 21st edition of the Nabisco Dinah Shore, and the tenth as a major championship.

Dottie Pepper (Mochrie) won the first of her two major titles in a sudden-death playoff over Juli Inkster with a par on the first extra hole. Pepper won the event again in 1999.

== Final leaderboard ==
Sunday, March 29, 1992

| Place | Player | Score | To par | Money ($) |
|---|---|---|---|---|
| T1 | (United States) Dottie Pepper | 69-71-70-69=279 | −9 | Playoff |
| T1 | (United States) Juli Inkster | 72-68-68-71=279 | −9 | Playoff |
| T3 | (United States) Brandie Burton | 70-72-71-68=281 | −7 | 42,269 |
| T3 | (United States) Patty Sheehan | 71-69-69-72=281 | −7 | 42,269 |
| 5 | (United States) Meg Mallon | 73-69-72-68=282 | −6 | 29,940 |
| T6 | (United States) Dale Eggeling | 67-78-69-70=284 | −4 | 22,719 |
| T6 | (United States) Sherri Steinhauer | 72-73-69-70=284 | −4 | 22,719 |
| T8 | (United States) Beth Daniel | 70-68-76-71=285 | −3 | 15,778 |
| T8 | (United States) Michelle McGann | 68-74-71-72=285 | −3 | 15,778 |
| T8 | (United States) Kris Tschetter | 73-71-73-68=285 | −3 | 15,778 |
| T8 | (Scotland) Pamela Wright | 74-71-71-69=285 | −3 | 15,778 |

=== Playoff ===
| Place | Player | Score | To par | Money ($) |
|---|---|---|---|---|
| 1 | (United States) Dottie Pepper | 4 | E | 105,000 |
| 2 | (United States) Juli Inkster | 5 | +1 | 65,165 |
