= Barb Whitehead =

American professional golfer (born 1961)

Personal information
- Full name: Barb Thomas Whitehead
- Nationality: United States
- Born: January 22, 1961 (age 65) Sibley, Iowa, U.S.
- Height: 5 ft 5 in (1.65 m)
- Spouse: Trentie Whitehead
- Children: 2

Career
- Sport: Golf
- College: Iowa State University; University of Tulsa
- Status: Professional
- Former tour: LPGA Tour
- Professional wins: 1

Number of wins by tour
- LPGA Tour: 1

Best results in LPGA major championships
- Chevron Championship: T25: 1988
- Women's PGA C'ship: T6: 1995
- U.S. Women's Open: T50: 1985
- du Maurier Classic: T32: 1996
- Women's British Open: DNP

Barb Thomas Whitehead (born January 22, 1961) is an American professional golfer who played on the LPGA Tour. She played under both her maiden name, Barb Thomas, and her married name, Barb Whitehead (since 1995).

== Career ==
Thomas was a three-time winner of the Iowa State Women's Amateur. She started playing golf at the age of 8 with the mentoring of her father. Whitehead credits her parents as being influential figures in her life and as having helped build her career.

Whitehead won once on the LPGA Tour in 1995.

== Awards and honors ==
In 2011, Whitehead was inducted into the Iowa Golf Hall of Fame.

== Amateur wins ==
- 1979 Iowa State Women's Amateur
- 1981 Iowa State Women's Amateur
- 1982 Iowa State Women's Amateur

== Professional wins ==
=== LPGA Tour wins (1) ===
No.	Date	Tournament	Winning score	Margin of victory	Runners-up
1	Feb 19, 1995	Cup Noodles Hawaiian Ladies Open	–12 (68-66-70=204)	5 strokes	(United States) Christa Johnson (Japan) Hiromi Kobayashi (United States) Kris Tschetter

LPGA Tour playoff record (0–1)

No.	Year	Tournament	Opponents	Result
1	1996	State Farm Rail Classic	(England) Laura Davies (United States) Michelle McGann	McGann won with birdie on third extra hole
