= 2024 U.S. Senior Women's Open =

Golf tournament

Tournament information
- Dates: August 1–4, 2024
- Location: Pittsburgh, Pennsylvania, U.S. 40.510°N 79.875°W
- Course: Fox Chapel Golf Club
- Organized by: USGA
- Tour: Legends Tour
- Format: 72 holes stroke play

Statistics
- Par: 71
- Length: 5,965 yards (5,454 m)
- Field: 120 players, 55 after cut
- Cut: 151 (+9)
- Prize fund: $1,000,000
- Winner's share: $180,000

Champion
- (United States) Leta Lindley
- 275 (−9)

Location map
- Location in the United States Location in Pennsylvania Fox Chapel G.C. (Pittsburgh)

The 2024 U.S. Senior Women's Open took place August 1–4 at Fox Chapel Golf Club in Pittsburgh, Pennsylvania, and was the sixth U.S. Senior Women's Open. It was a professional golf tournament organized by the United States Golf Association (USGA), open to women over 50 years of age and one of two yearly senior women's major golf championships.

== Venue ==
The hosting club was established in 1923 and the championship course designed by Seth Reynor and opened in the same year, situated approximately 11 miles (18 kilometers) north-east of Pittsburgh city center..

The club had previously hosted the 2002 Curtis Cup match between the female amateur teams of United States and Great Britain/Ireland.

== Field ==
The championship was open to any professional or amateur golfer who was 50 years of age or over as of August 1, however restricted by a certain handicap level. 402 entries were accepted.

120 players, 87 professionals and 33 amateurs, were qualified for the championship and entered the competition, either exempt through some of several exemption categories or through sectional qualifying at different sites around United States in the summer of 2024.

55 players, 48 professionals and seven amateurs, made the 36-hole cut at nine over par.

Defending champion Trish Johnson missed the 36-hole-cut. 2018 champion Laura Davies withdraw during the second round.

1971 and 1976 U.S. Women's Open champion, 85-year-old JoAnne Carner, shot five strokes under the number of her age in the second round but missed the cut by 14 strokes

Teryll Samuel finished low amateur at 8-over-par 292, tied for 19th place.

== Results ==
Place	Player	Score	To par
1	(United States) Leta Lindley	69-71-71-64=275	−9
2	(Japan) Kaori Yamamoto	67-67-72-71=277	−7
3	(Japan) Nobuko Kizawa	73-71-69-68=281	−3
4	(Sweden) Annika Sörenstam	71-69-71-71=282	−2
5	(Japan) Mikuno Kobo	70-71-70-72=283	−1
6	(United States) Juli Inkster	72-68-71-73=284	E
T7	(United States) Christa Johnson	68-70-77-71=286	+2
T7	(Japan) Junko Omote	72-71-72-71=286	+2
T9	(Italy) Stefania Croce	72-66-75-75=288	+4
T9	(Canada) Korina Kelepouris	70-75-74-69=288	+4
T9	(United States) Maggie Will	73-70-70-75=288	+4
