= Barb Mucha =

American professional golfer (born 1961)

Personal information
- Nationality: United States
- Born: December 1, 1961 (age 64) Parma Heights, Ohio, U.S.
- Height: 5 ft 6 in (1.68 m)

Career
- Sport: Golf
- College: Michigan State University
- Status: Professional
- Former tour: LPGA Tour
- Professional wins: 12

Number of wins by tour
- LPGA Tour: 5
- Epson Tour: 6
- Other: 1

Best results in LPGA major championships
- Chevron Championship: T11: 1995
- Women's PGA C'ship: T9: 1997
- U.S. Women's Open: T17: 1993
- du Maurier Classic: T6: 1992
- Women's British Open: DNP

Barb Mucha (born December 1, 1961) is an American professional golfer.

Mucha was born in Parma Heights, Ohio. She played college golf at Michigan State University.

Prior to joining the LPGA Tour in 1987, Mucha won six events on the Futures Tour. Mucha won five LPGA Tour events between 1990 and 1998.

== Professional wins (12) ==
=== LPGA Tour wins (5) ===
No.	Date	Tournament	Winning score	Margin of victory	Runner(s)-up
1	Aug 5, 1990	Boston Five Classic	–11 (71-70-67-69=277)	Playoff	(United States) Lenore Rittenhouse
2	May 31, 1992	Oldsmobile Classic	–12 (70-70-65-71=276)	1 stroke	(United States) Dottie Pepper
3	Sep 5, 1994	State Farm Rail Classic	–13 (67-69-67=203)	1 stroke	(United States) Kim Shipman
4	Apr 21, 1996	Chick-fil-A Charity Championship	–8 (68-70-70=208)	2 strokes	(Sweden) Liselotte Neumann (United States) Dottie Pepper
5	May 10, 1998	Sara Lee Classic	–11 (67-69-69=205)	Playoff	(United States) Donna Andrews (Peru) (Sweden) Jenny Lidback (United States) Nancy Lopez

LPGA Tour playoff record (2–0)

No.	Year	Tournament	Opponent(s)	Result
1	1990	Boston Five Classic	(United States) Lenore Rittenhouse	Won with birdie on second extra hole
2	1998	Sara Lee Classic	(United States) Donna Andrews (Peru) (Sweden) Jenny Lidback (United States) Nancy Lopez	Won with birdie on second extra hole

=== Futures Tour wins (6) ===
- 1985 (1) St. George Invitational
- 1986 (5) Ravines Classic, Turkey Creek Classic, River Edge Classic, Prescott Classic, TECH Futures Classic

=== Legends Tour wins (1) ===
- 2012 Wendy's Charity Challenge

== Team appearances ==
Professional

- Handa Cup (representing the United States): 2013, 2014 (winners), 2015 (winners)
