= 1995 LPGA Championship =

Tournament information
- Dates: May 11–14, 1995
- Location: Wilmington, Delaware; 39.789°N 75.564°W
- Course: DuPont Country Club
- Tour: LPGA Tour
- Format: Stroke play - 72 holes

Statistics
- Par: 71
- Length: 6,386 yards (5,839 m)
- Cut: 147 (+5)
- Prize fund: $1.2 million
- Winner's share: $180,000

Champion
- (United States) Kelly Robbins
- 274 (−10)
- Location in United States Location in Delaware

The 1995 LPGA Championship was the 41st LPGA Championship, played May 11–14 at DuPont Country Club in Wilmington, Delaware.

Kelly Robbins won her only major title, one stroke ahead of defending champion Laura Davies. Robbins had led after each of the first two rounds, but fell a stroke behind leader Davies after 54 holes. In a cool rain on Sunday, Robbins birdied three of the final seven holes to pass Davies for the win.

This was the second of eleven consecutive LPGA Championships at DuPont Country Club. It was the richest major on tour from 1990 through this year, passed by the U.S. Women's Open in 1996.

== Final leaderboard ==
Sunday, May 14, 1995

Place	Player	Score	To par	Money ($)
1	(United States) Kelly Robbins	66-68-72-68=274	−10	180,000
2	(England) Laura Davies	68-68-69-70=275	−9	111,711
T3	(United States) Marianne Morris	67-71-70-72=280	−4	65,415
T3	(United States) Julie Piers	71-68-70-71=280	−4	65,415
T3	(United States) Patty Sheehan	67-68-72-73=280	−4	65,415
T6	(United States) Dottie Pepper	67-70-71-73=281	−3	38,947
T6	(United States) Barb Whitehead	70-66-73-72=281	−3	38,947
T8	(United States) Pat Bradley	71-70-70-71=282	−2	29,890
T8	(United States) Tammie Green	69-72-70-71=282	−2	29,890
10	(Sweden) Annika Sörenstam	71-71-72-69=283	−1	25,362
