= Tina Tombs =

Canadian professional golfer (born 1962)

Personal information
- Full name: Tina M. Tombs
- Nationality: Canada
- Born: April 4, 1962 (age 64) Montreal, Quebec, Canada
- Height: 5 ft 8 in (1.73 m)

Career
- Sport: Golf
- College: Arizona State University
- Turned professional: 1985
- Former tours: LPGA Tour (1988-1999); Ladies European Tour; Futures Tour; Legends Tour
- Professional wins: 1

Number of wins by tour
- LPGA Tour: 1

Best results in LPGA major championships
- Chevron Championship: T28: 1994
- Women's PGA C'ship: T36: 1999
- U.S. Women's Open: T31: 1984
- du Maurier Classic: T31: 1988

Tina M. Tombs (born April 4, 1962) is a Canadian professional golfer who played on the LPGA Tour. She played under both her maiden name, Tina Tombs, and a married name, Tina Purtzer (1988–92).

== Career ==
Purtzer won once on the LPGA Tour in 1990.

== Professional wins ==
=== LPGA Tour wins (1) ===
No.	Date	Tournament	Winning score	Margin of victory	Runners-up
1	Jul 8, 1990	Jamie Farr Toledo Classic	−8 (67-72-66=205)	4 strokes	(United States) JoAnne Carner (United States) Christa Johnson

LPGA Tour playoff record (0–1)

No.	Year	Tournament	Opponent	Result
1	1993	Sara Lee Classic	(United States) Meg Mallon	Lost to birdie on third extra hole

== Team appearances ==
Professional

- Handa Cup (representing World team): 2008, 2011
