= 2009 Legends Tour =

Women's golf tour events

The 2009 Legends Tour was a series of professional golf tour events for women aged 45 and older sanctioned by the Legends Tour. Based in the United States, it is an offshoot of the main U.S.-based women's tour, the LPGA Tour. The tour was founded in 2001, and is intended to allow women to prolong their competitive golf careers on the model of the successful Champions Tour for men.

== Schedule and results ==
The 2009 Legends Tour consisted of five events. The number in brackets after each winner's name is the number of Legends Tour events she had won up to and including that tournament.

Dates	Tournament	Location	Winner
Aug 10	Wendy's Charity Classic	Michigan	(United States) Christa Johnson (3)
Sep 9	BJ's Charity Pro-Am; Unofficial	Massachusetts	(United States) Cindy Rarick, (United States) Nancy Scranton, (United States) Colleen Walker (Jones course) (United States) Laurie Rinker (Nicklaus course)
Oct 24–25	Kinoshita Pearl Classic	Hawaii	(United States) Rosie Jones (3)
Nov 21–22	Legends Tour Open Championship	Florida	(United States) Sherri Steinhauer (1)
Dec 5–6	Handa Cup	Florida	United States
