= Leta Lindley =

American professional golfer (born 1972)

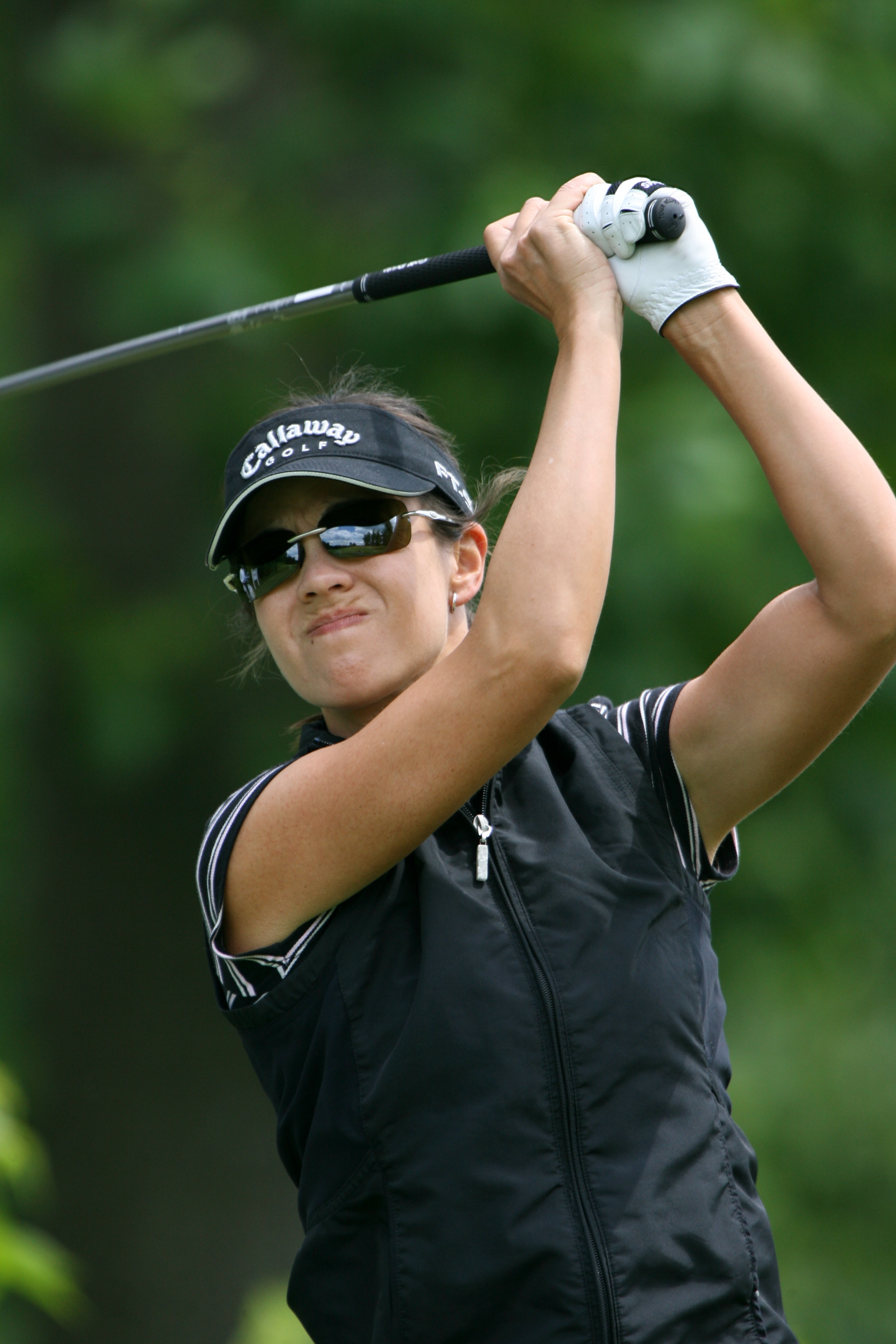
- Lindley at the 2007 LPGA Championship

Personal information
- Nationality: United States
- Born: June 1, 1972 (age 54) Phoenix, Arizona, U.S.
- Height: 5 ft 4 in (1.63 m)
- Spouse: Matt Plagmann (m. 1996)
- Children: 2

Career
- Sport: Golf
- College: University of Arizona
- Turned professional: 1994
- Current tour: Legends of the LPGA
- Former tour: LPGA Tour
- Professional wins: 4

Number of wins by tour
- LPGA Tour: 1
- Other: 3

Best results in LPGA major championships
- Chevron Championship: T9: 2002
- Women's PGA C'ship: 2nd: 1997
- U.S. Women's Open: T5: 1995
- du Maurier Classic: T23: 2000
- Women's British Open: T38: 2008

Achievements and awards
- NGCA Players Hall of Fame: 2006
- Heather Farr Player Award: 2008

Leta Lindley (born June 1, 1972) is an American professional golfer. She played on the LPGA Tour between 1995 and 2012, and currently plays on the Legends of the LPGA circuit. Lindley was runner-up at the 1997 LPGA Championship and won the 2008 LPGA Corning Classic. She has won three Legends of the LPGA tournaments, including her first career major, the 2024 U.S. Senior Women's Open.

== Early life and amateur career ==
In 1972, Lindley was born in Phoenix, Arizona. Lindley's first golf job was painting stripes on range balls as an 11-year-old.

he played collegiate golf at the University of Arizona, where she briefly roomed with Annika Sörenstam. She was a four-time All-American, three-time Academic All-American, and finished third at the 1993 NCAA Championship. She was a Honda Sports Award finalist twice, and lost out to Vicki Goetze in 1992 and Charlotta Sörenstam in 1993. In addition, she was the medalist at the 1994 U.S. Women's Amateur. In 1994, she earned a degree in communications.

== Professional career ==
In 1994, Lindley turned pro. Lindley had a long and successful career on tour, and earned non-exempt status for the 1995 LPGA Tour season by finishing tied 52nd at the LPGA Final Qualifying Tournament. In her rookie season, she tied for third at the State Farm Rail Classic and tied for fifth at the 1995 U.S. Women's Open.

In 1997, she recorded her career-best major finish with at the McDonald's LPGA Championship, where she lost a playoff to Christa Johnson on the second hole. She recorded her first LPGA career hole-in-one during the second round of the Edina Realty LPGA Classic.

In 1999, she was runner-up at the City of Hope Myrtle Beach Classic. She crossed the $1 million mark in career earnings in 2000 and the $2 million mark in 2005. After almost 15 years on tour, she won the 2008 Corning Classic in her 295th LPGA Tour start. She crossed the $3 million mark in career earnings and retired from full-time competition at the end of the 2012 season, ranking among the top 60 all-time LPGA money winners, despite having only one win.

After recording runner-up finishes in 2022 and 2023, she won the U.S. Senior Women's Open in 2024.

== Awards and honors ==
- In 2006, she entered the NCGA's Players Hall of Fame.
- In 2008, she earned the LPGA's Heather Farr Player Award, given to a golfer "who, through her hard work, dedication and love of the game of golf, has demonstrated determination, perseverance and spirit in fulfilling her goals as a player."

== Personal life ==
Lindley's husband, Matt Plagmann, caddies for her; her son Cole (born 2004) and daughter Reese (born 2006) traveled with the couple.

== Amateur wins ==
- 1989 AJGA Tournament of Champions
- 1994 Pac-10 Conference Championship

== Professional wins (4) ==
=== LPGA Tour wins (1) ===
No.	Date	Tournament	Winning score	Margin of victory	Runner-up
1	May 25, 2008	LPGA Corning Classic	−11 (73-67-70-67=277)	Playoff	(South Korea) Jeong Jang

LPGA Tour playoff record (1–1)

No.	Year	Tournament	Opponent	Result
1	1997	McDonald's LPGA Championship	(United States) Christa Johnson	Lost to par on second extra hole
2	2008	LPGA Corning Classic	(South Korea) Jeong Jang	Won with birdie on first extra hole

=== Legends of the LPGA wins (3) ===
No.	Date	Tournament	Winning score	Margin of victory	Runner-up
1	Jul 12, 2023	St Johns Challenge	−7 (65)	2 strokes	(United States) Nicole Jeray
2	Nov 8, 2023	Cove Cay Legends	−14 (65-65=130)	7 strokes	(United States) Moira Dunn-Bohls
3	Aug 4, 2024	U.S. Senior Women's Open	−9 (69-71-71-64=275)	2 strokes	(Japan) Kaori Yamamoto

== Results in LPGA majors ==
Tournament	1995	1996	1997	1998	1999	2000
Chevron Championship		T54		CUT		T27
Women's PGA Championship		CUT	2	CUT	T26	T12
U.S. Women's Open	T5	CUT	CUT		T20	T46
du Maurier Classic	T53	CUT	T66	CUT	CUT	T23

Tournament	2001	2002	2003	2004	2005	2006	2007	2008	2009	2010	2011	2012
Chevron Championship	T48	T9	27		T35		T30		WD	CUT	T29	78
Women's PGA Championship	T17	T25	CUT		T25		T30	T65				T45
U.S. Women's Open	T43	CUT	T22		T19		T50	T53	CUT		T21	
Women's British Open ^			CUT				CUT	T38				

Tournament	2013–2024	2025
Chevron Championship		
U.S. Women's Open		CUT
Women's PGA Championship		
The Evian Championship		
Women's British Open		

^ The Women's British Open replaced the du Maurier Classic as an LPGA major in 2001.
^ The Evian Championship was added as a major in 2013.

Top 10
Did not play

CUT = missed the half-way cut
WD = withdrew
T = tied
