= 2014 Legends Tour =

The 2014 Legends Tour was a series of professional golf tour events for women aged 45 and older sanctioned by the Legends Tour. Based in the United States, it is an offshoot of the main U.S.-based women's tour, the LPGA Tour. The tour was founded in 2001, and is intended to allow women to prolong their competitive golf careers on the model of the successful Champions Tour for men.

== Schedule and results ==
In 2014 the Legends Tour had seven events on the schedule. The number in brackets after each winner's name is the number of Legends Tour events she had won up to and including that tournament.

Dates	Tournament	Location	Winner(s)
Mar 3–4	Walgreens Charity Classic	Arizona	(Sweden) Liselotte Neumann (1)
Jun 28	Judson Collegiate & Legends Pro-Am Challenge	Georgia	(United States) Barb Moxness (2)
Aug 10	Wendy's Charity Challenge	Michigan	(United States) Rosie Jones (7)
Aug 15–17	The Legends Championship	Indiana	(United States) Laurie Rinker (3)
Sep 17	BJ's Charity Pro-Am; Unofficial	Massachusetts	(United States) Lori Atsedes & (United States) Jean Bartholomew (Jones course) (United States) Lisa Grimes (Nicklaus course)
Sep 27–28	ISPS Handa Cup	Mississippi	(United States) Team USA
Nov 8–9	Walgreens Charity Championship	Florida	(United States) Meg Mallon (1)

== Money leaders ==
This section shows the final money leaders table. The list is based on the three 36-hole tournaments.

Rank	Player	Country	Events	Prize money ($)
1	Laurie Rinker	United States	3	68,343
2	Rosie Jones	United States	3	49,179
3	Liselotte Neumann	Sweden	3	46,787
4	Sherri Steinhauer	United States	3	44,634
5	Danielle Ammaccapane	United States	3	40,111
