= 1990 LPGA Championship =

Coordinates: 39.015°N 77.152°W

Tournament information
- Dates: July 26–29, 1990
- Location: Bethesda, Maryland
- Course: Bethesda Country Club
- Tour: LPGA Tour
- Format: Stroke play - 72 holes

Statistics
- Par: 71
- Length: 6,246 yards (5,711 m)
- Cut: 150 (+8)
- Prize fund: $1.0 million
- Winner's share: $150,000

Champion
- (United States) Beth Daniel
- 280 (−4)

Location in the United States
Location in Maryland

The 1990 LPGA Championship was the 36th LPGA Championship, played July 26–29 at Bethesda Country Club in Bethesda, Maryland, a suburb northwest of Washington, D.C.

Five strokes back, Beth Daniel shot a final round 66 (−5) for 280 (−4) to win her sole major title, a stroke ahead of runner-up Rosie Jones, the third round leader.

This was the first of four consecutive LPGA Championships at Bethesda Country Club. The purse (and winner's share) were doubled this year to $1 million and $150,000, respectively, the largest in LPGA Tour history. The LPGA Championship was the tour's richest major from this year through 1995.

== Final leaderboard ==
Sunday, July 29, 1990

| Place | Player | Score | To par | Money ($) |
|---|---|---|---|---|
| 1 | (United States) Beth Daniel | 71-73-70-66=280 | −4 | 150,000 |
| 2 | (United States) Rosie Jones | 69-70-70-72=281 | −3 | 92,500 |
| 3 | (Canada) Dawn Coe | 73-71-68-72=284 | E | 67,500 |
| 4 | (United States) Sue Ertl | 70-67-79-69=285 | +1 | 52,500 |
| T5 | (United States) Cindy Figg-Currier | 72-68-73-73=286 | +2 | 33,250 |
| T5 | (United States) Tammie Green | 72-72-70-72=286 | +2 | 33,250 |
| T5 | (United States) Betsy King | 72-73-72-69=286 | +2 | 33,250 |
| T5 | (United States) Patty Sheehan | 75-71-70-70=286 | +2 | 33,250 |
| T9 | (United States) Pat Bradley | 73-71-71-72=287 | +3 | 19,500 |
| T9 | (United States) Cathy Johnston-Forbes | 70-70-71-76=287 | +3 | 19,500 |
| T9 | (Japan) Ayako Okamoto | 75-69-70-73=287 | +3 | 19,500 |
| T9 | (France) Anne Marie Palli | 75-72-70-70=287 | +3 | 19,500 |
| T9 | (United States) Deb Richard | 71-72-70-74=287 | +3 | 19,500 |
