= 2007 Legends Tour =

Ages 45+ women's golf tour

The 2007 Legends Tour was a series of professional golf tour for women aged 45 and older sanctioned by the Legends Tour. Based in the United States, it is an offshoot of the main U.S.-based women's tour, the LPGA Tour. The tour was founded in 2001, and is intended to allow women to prolong their competitive golf careers on the model of the successful Champions Tour for men.

== Schedule and results ==
In 2007, the Legends Tour had two events in Australia. The number in brackets after each winner's name is the number of Legends Tour events she had won up to and including that tournament.

Dates	Tournament	Location	Winner
Apr 30	Duane Reade Charity Classic	New Jersey	Patty Sheehan's Team
Aug 4–5	BJ's Charity Championship	Massachusetts	(United States) Christa Johnson (2) & Nancy Scranton (2)
Aug 12	Wendy's Charity Challenge	Michigan	(United States) Rosie Jones (1)
Oct 27–28	Australia Handa Cup	Perth, Australia	(Australia) Jan Stephenson (2)
Nov 3–4	Legends Tour Open Championship	Sydney, Australia	(United States) Rosie Jones (2)
Dec 15–16	Handa Cup	Florida	(United States) Team USA

== See also ==
- Professional golf tours
