= Jonathan Satter =

American businessman and political appointee

Jonathan R. Satter
- Born: January 1969 (age 57); United States
- Occupation: Business executive
- Known for: Secretary of the Florida Department of Management Services (2019-2022)
- Spouse: Michelle McGann (m. 2010)

Jonathan Satter (born January 1969) is an American business executive and government official. After a career in the private sector in real estate, Satter entered the public sector in 2005 when he was appointed by Florida Governor Jeb Bush to a commissioner and later chairman of the Health Care District of Palm Beach County, where he served four terms.

In 2019, Florida Governor Ron DeSantis appointed Satter as the secretary of the Florida Department of Management Services and later in response to the effects of COVID-19 increased his responsibility by naming him as the unemployment "czar", overseeing all responses to unemployment caused by the crisis.

He returned to the private sector in 2022, but was again entered the public sector when he was appointed by governor Ron DeSantis to the Board of Directors of both Enterprise Florida and Space Florida.

== Early life ==
Jonathan Satter was born in January 1969 in the United States. Satter attended Rollins College in Winter Park, Florida, where he earned a Bachelor of Arts degree. He later completed a Master of Business Administration (MBA) at Nova Southeastern University in Fort Lauderdale, Florida.

== Career ==
Satter began his professional life in the real estate sector, where he founded WGCompass Realty Partners, a commercial real-estate services firm that was later acquired by Avison Young.

From 2013 to 2018, Satter was managing director of US operations, and principal of Avison Young, which had acquired his firm.

=== Public sector under Bush ===
Satter was appointed by Florida Governor Jeb Bush in 2005, and reappointed in 2006, to serve as a commissioner of the Health Care District of Palm Beach County. In 2008, Satter was elected chairman of the board of commissioners of the Health Care District, a comprehensive and diverse public health care delivery system, overseeing 1,000+ employees and a $275+ million budget. In 2011, Satter was unanimously reelected for an unprecedented fourth term as Chairman, a step so unusual that it required a change to the district’s bylaws.

=== Public sector under DeSantis ===
In 2019, Florida Governor Ron DeSantis appointed Satter as the secretary of the Florida Department of Management Services. As Secretary, Satter acted as the chief operating officer of state government, overseeing business, workforce, and technology operations for the 3rd largest state government in the United States with 100,000+ employees, and a $100 billion budget. Satter was unanimously confirmed by the Florida Senate.

In April 2020, in response to the effects of COVID-19 on the Florida economy, Ron DeSantis increased Satter's responsibilities by naming him as the unemployment "czar", overseeing all responses to the unemployment crisis in Florida, taking the responsibilities away from Department of Economic Opportunity Director Ken Lawson. Shortly after the appointment, the unemployment system showed slow but significant improvement under Satter. A month after Satter took over, DeSantis claimed many of the problems had been fixed, and that “99.99 percent” of people who had filed claims correctly had been paid. According to the Tampa Bay Times, Satter's role was one of 8 key decisions Ron DeSantis has made that shaped Florida’s response to the pandemic.

In February 2021, media reported that Satter would be leaving the Ron DeSantis administration and return to the private sector.

In April 2022, PE Hub reported that Satter had been named Chief Operating Officer and Managing Director of White Wolf Capital Group, a Florida based investment firm. Satter previously had served as a Senior Advisor and board member of the firm. White Wolf Capital is a private investment firm that began operations in late 2011 and is focused on making both direct and indirect investments in leading middle market companies located in North America. On the direct side, White Wolf Capital seeks both private equity as well as private credit investment opportunities in companies with $20 million to $200 million in revenues and up to $20 million in EBITDA. Typical situations include, management buyouts, leveraged buyouts, recapitalizations and investments for growth. Preferred industries include manufacturing, business services, information technology, security, aerospace and defense.

In October 2022, Florida Governor Ron DeSantis appointed Satter to the Board of Directors of both Enterprise Florida and Space Florida.

== Personal life ==
In 2010, Satter married LPGA professional golfer Michelle McGann in Ogunquit Maine. Satter and McGann reside in North Palm Beach, Florida.
