= Becky Iverson =

American professional golfer (born 1967)

Personal information
- Nationality: United States
- Born: October 12, 1967 (age 59) Escanaba, Michigan, U.S.
- Height: 5 ft 9 in (1.75 m)

Career
- Sport: Golf
- College: Michigan State University
- Turned professional: 1989
- Former tours: LPGA Tour; Futures Tour
- Professional wins: 4

Number of wins by tour
- LPGA Tour: 1
- Epson Tour: 3

Best results in LPGA major championships
- Chevron Championship: T9: 2002
- Women's PGA C'ship: T6: 2001
- U.S. Women's Open: T12: 1999
- du Maurier Classic: T7: 2000
- Women's British Open: T40: 2002

Becky Iverson (born October 12, 1967) is an American professional golfer who played on the LPGA Tour. She currently works as the director of golf at The Bridges Golf Club in Madison, Wisconsin

== Early life and amateur career ==
In 1967, Iverson was born in Escanaba, Michigan.

Iverson was 1986 Michigan Junior Amateur champion and 1987 Michigan Women's Amateur champion. She played her collegiate golf at Michigan State University where she was 1987 Academic All-American and 1987-88 Academic All-Big Ten.

== Professional career ==
In 1989, Iverson turned professional. She played full-time on the Futures Tour from 1989 to 1993 and sparingly since 1994, winning three times.

In 1993, she tied for 43rd at the LPGA Final Qualifying Tournament to earn non-exempt status for the 1994 LPGA season. She gained her only LPGA victory in 1995 at the Friendly's Classic. She was a member of the 2000 United States Solheim Cup team.

== Professional wins (4) ==
=== LPGA Tour wins (1) ===
No.	Date	Tournament	Winning score	Margin of victory	Runners-up
1	Jul 30, 1995	Friendly's Classic	–12 (71-63-72-70=276)	2 strokes	(Sweden) Helen Alfredsson (United States) Kelly Robbins

LPGA Tour playoff record (0–1)

No.	Year	Tournament	Opponents	Result
1	1999	Firstar LPGA Classic	(United States) Rosie Jones (Australia) Jan Stephenson	Jones won with par on fourth extra hole Stephenson eliminated by par on first hole

=== Futures Tour wins (3) ===
- 1994 (2) Olympia Spa Futures Classic, 13th Annual Salisbury Futures Classic
- 1997 (1) Betty Puskar Morgantown Futures Classic

== Team appearances ==
Professional

- Solheim Cup (representing the United States): 2000
