= Kathy Ireland Championship =

Golf tournament formerly on the LPGA Tour

The Kathy Ireland Championship was a golf tournament on the LPGA Tour from 1999 to 2001. It was played at Onion Creek Club in Austin, Texas. Kathy Ireland was the title sponsor of the 2001 edition and all three editions were held in honor of Harvey Penick, an Austin native and World Golf Hall of Fame golf instructor.

== Winners ==
Kathy Ireland Championship Honoring Harvey Penick

- 2001 Rosie Jones

The Philips Invitational Honoring Harvey Penick

- 2000 Laura Davies
- 1999 Akiko Fukushima
