= Onion Creek Club =

Golf club

- Interactive map of Onion Creek Club
- 30°8′11″N 97°47′16″W

Club information
- Established: 1974
- Owner: Arcis Golf
- Operator: Arcis Golf
- Tota holes: 27
- Tournaments: Legends of Golf
- Website: Official website
- Designed by: Jimmy Demaret

Onion Creek Club is a 27-hole golf course located in Austin, Texas. Opened in 1974, it is the only golf course designed by Jimmy Demaret, three-time Masters winner. The course was restored by Coore & Crenshaw in 2014 after being destroyed by a flood the same year.

The idea for a senior tour grew out of a highly successful event at Onion Creek Club in 1978. That event, the Legends of Golf, featured competition between two-member teams of some of the greatest older golfers of that day. The Senior PGA Tour was formally established in 1980.

Onion Creek Club has hosted the Kathy Ireland Championship and qualifiers for the 2018 U.S. Senior Women's Open.
