= 2012 Legends Tour =

The 2012 Legends Tour was a series of professional golf tour events for women aged 45 and older sanctioned by the Legends Tour. Based in the United States, it is an offshoot of the main U.S.-based women's tour, the LPGA Tour. The tour was founded in 2001, and is intended to allow women to prolong their competitive golf careers on the model of the successful Champions Tour for men.

== Schedule and results ==
The Legends Tour introduced four new events in 2012, including a first-time visit for the LPGA to the state of Maine. The number in brackets after each winner's name is the number of Legends Tour events she had won up to and including that tournament.

Dates	Tournament	Location	Winner
Apr 28–29	Walgreens Charity Classic	Arizona	(United States) Rosie Jones (5)
Jun 21–24	Hannaford Community Challenge	Maine	(United States) Sherri Turner (2)
Jul 16–18	Judson Collegiate Invitational	Georgia	(Peru) Alicia Dibos (1)
Jul 29	LPGA Legends Swing for the Cure	Washington	(United States) Nancy Scranton (4)
Aug 12	Wendy's Charity Challenge	Michigan	(United States) Barb Mucha (1)
Nov 3–4	Handa Cup	Florida	United States
Nov 10–11	ISPS Handa Legends Tour Open Championship	Florida	(England) Laura Davies (1)
