= 1994 du Maurier Classic =

Women's golf tournament

Coordinates: 45.3405°N 75.6847°W

The 1994 du Maurier Classic was contested from August 25–28 at Ottawa Hunt and Golf Club. It was the 22nd edition of the du Maurier Classic, and the 16th edition as a major championship on the LPGA Tour.

This event was won by Martha Nause.

== Final leaderboard ==
Place	Player	Score	To par	Money (US$)
1	(United States) Martha Nause	65-71-72-71=279	−9	120,000
2	(United States) Michelle McGann	66-71-71-72=280	−8	74,474
3	(Sweden) Liselotte Neumann	70-67-71-73=281	−7	54,346
T4	(United States) Jane Geddes	74-67-70-72=283	−5	34,888
T4	(United States) Betsy King	67-69-74-73=283	−5	34,888
T4	(United States) Meg Mallon	70-72-68-73=283	−5	34,888
T7	(Canada) Dawn Coe-Jones	72-70-71-71=284	−4	20,128
T7	(United States) Judy Dickinson	72-68-70-74=284	−4	20,128
T7	(United States) Marianne Morris	69-72-70-73=284	−4	20,128
T7	(United States) Kelly Robbins	66-70-73-75=284	−4	20,128
