= Santa Barbara Open =

Golf tournament formerly on the LPGA Tour

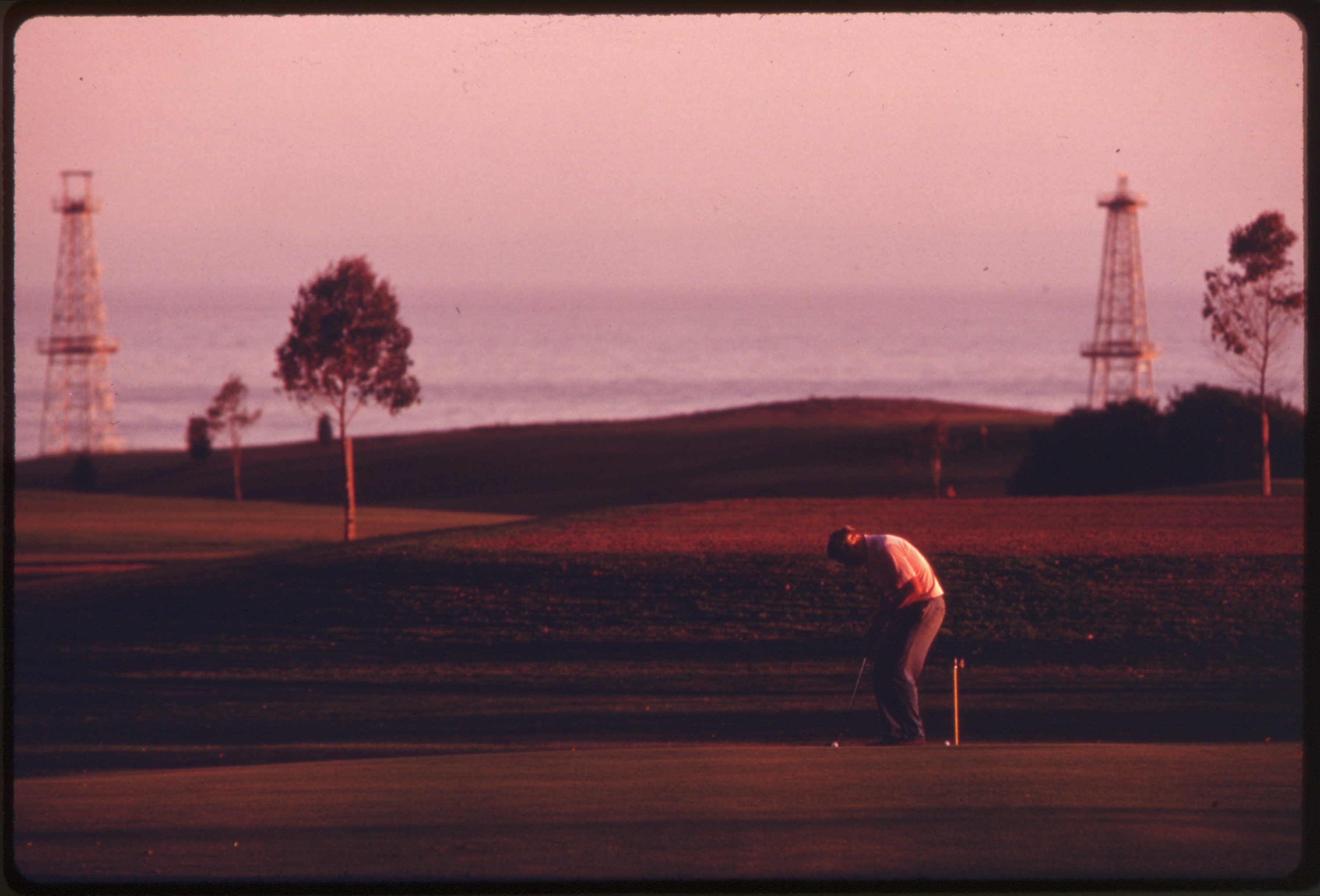
- Oil derricks near Sandpiper Golf Club

Tournament information
- Location: Santa Barbara County, California
- Established: 1987
- Courses: Sandpiper Golf Club, La Purisima Golf Course
- Tour: LPGA Tour
- Format: Stroke play
- Final year: 1988

Final champion
- Rosie Jones
- Location in California

The Santa Barbara Open was a golf tournament on the LPGA Tour from 1987 to 1988. It was played at two courses in the Santa Barbara, California area: Sandpiper Golf Club in Goleta and La Purisima Golf Course in Lompoc. In 1987, the field was split for the first two rounds, half playing on each course, then switching to the other course on the second day. the final round was played at Sandpiper. In 1988, the first round was played at Sandpiper, and the second and third rounds were played at La Purisima.

== Winners ==
- 1988 Rosie Jones
- 1987 Jan Stephenson
