= Subaru Memorial of Naples =

Golf tournament formerly on the LPGA Tour

The Subaru Memorial of Naples was a golf tournament on the LPGA Tour from 1999 to 2001. It was played at The Club at The Strand in Naples, Florida.

== Winners ==
Subaru Memorial of Naples

- 2001 Sophie Gustafson
- 2000 Nancy Scranton

Naples LPGA Memorial

- 1999 Meg Mallon
