= 1982 Peter Jackson Classic =

Coordinates: 43.675°N 79.531°W

The 1982 Peter Jackson Classic was contested from July 1–4 at St. George's Golf and Country Club. It was the 10th edition of the Peter Jackson Classic, and the fourth edition as a major championship on the LPGA Tour.

This event was won by Sandra Haynie.

== Final leaderboard ==
Place	Player	Score	To par	Money (US$)
1	(United States) Sandra Haynie	71-71-70-68=280	−8	30,000
2	(United States) Beth Daniel	67-75-70-69=281	−7	19,600
T3	(United States) Donna Caponi	70-73-69-71=283	−5	12,000
T3	(United States) JoAnne Carner	74-71-69-69=283	−5	12,000
T5	(South Africa) Sally Little	71-73-73-70=287	−1	7,500
T5	(United States) Beverly Klass	72-71-71-73=287	−1	7,500
T7	(United States) Dale Eggeling	70-72-72-74=288	E	6,100
T7	(Australia) Jan Stephenson	70-73-74-71=288	E	6,100
T9	(United States) Nancy Lopez	74-72-75-69=290	+2	5,200
T9	(United States) Sandra Palmer	74-74-77-65=290	+2	5,200
