= Martha Nause =

American professional golfer (born 1954)

Personal information
- Full name: Martha Nause
- Nationality: United States
- Born: September 10, 1954 (age 72) Sheboygan, Wisconsin, U.S.
- Height: 5 ft 5 in (1.65 m)

Career
- Sport: Golf
- College: St. Olaf College
- Turned professional: 1978
- Former tour: LPGA Tour (1978–1999)
- Professional wins: 4

Number of wins by tour
- LPGA Tour: 3
- Other: 1

Best results in LPGA major championships (wins: 1)
- Chevron Championship: T6: 1991
- Women's PGA C'ship: T10: 1981
- U.S. Women's Open: 8th: 1987
- du Maurier Classic: Won: 1994

Achievements and awards
- Heather Farr Player Award: 1996

Martha Nause (born September 10, 1954) is an American professional golfer. She is a three-time winner on the LPGA tour, including one major championship, the 1994 du Maurier Classic.

== Career ==
In 1954, Nause was born in Sheboygan, Wisconsin. She attended St. Olaf College and her rookie year on the LPGA Tour was 1978.

Nause's other tour wins were the 1991 LPGA Chicago Sun-Times Shoot-Out and the 1988 Planters Pat Bradley International. She played on winning teams for the USA against Japan in the Nichirei Cup in 1988, 1991 and 1994. Her best money list finish was 19th in 1988. Her last full season on the tour was 1999 and she later became a college golf coach.

Nause also played on the Legends Tour. In 2006, she won the Hy-Vee Classic on the Legends Tour and was the tour's leading money earner. She played in the U.S. Women's Open in 2008 and 2010 and the inaugural U.S. Senior Women's Open in 2018.

Nause coached the Macalester College men's and women's golf teams from 2000 to 2012 and was named 2006-07 MIAC Women's Golf Coach of the Year after guiding the Scots to their best finish ever. She coached numerous All-Conference and NCAA Division III championship golfers, including four All-Americans.

Nause was a long-time student of golf instructor Manuel de la Torre.

== Awards and honors ==
- In 1990, Nause was the first woman inducted into the St. Olaf College Athletic Hall of Fame.
- In 1995, she was also inducted into the Wisconsin Golf Hall of Fame.
- In 1996, she earned the Heather Farr Player Award bestowed to a player "who, through her hard work, dedication and love of the game of golf, has demonstrated determination, perseverance and spirit in fulfilling her goals as a player."

== Professional wins (4) ==
=== LPGA Tour wins (3) ===
Legend
LPGA Tour major championships (1)
Other LPGA Tour (2)

No.	Date	Tournament	Winning score	Margin of victory	Runner(s)-up
1	Aug 6, 1988	Planters Pat Bradley International	14 points	1 point	(United States) Judy Dickinson (United States) Debbie Massey
2	Aug 25, 1991	LPGA Chicago Sun-Times Shoot-Out	–13 (68-73-69-65=275)	1 stroke	(United States) Kris Monaghan
3	Aug 28, 1994	du Maurier Classic	–9 (65-71-72-71=279)	1 stroke	(United States) Michelle McGann

LPGA Tour playoff record (0–1)

No.	Year	Tournament	Opponents	Result
1	1996	HealthSouth Inaugural	(United States) Jane Geddes (Australia) Karrie Webb	Webb won with par on fourth extra hole Nause eliminated by par on first hole

=== Legends Tour wins (1) ===
- 2006 HyVee Classic

== Major championships ==
=== Wins (1) ===
Year	Championship	Winning score	Margin	Runner-up
1994	du Maurier Classic	−9 (65-71-72-71=279)	1 stroke	(United States) Michelle McGann

=== Results timeline ===
Tournament	1978	1979	1980
LPGA Championship	CUT	CUT	T58
U.S. Women's Open			T35
du Maurier Classic	–	T64	CUT

Tournament	1981	1982	1983	1984	1985	1986	1987	1988	1989	1990
Kraft Nabisco Championship	–	–	T52	T50	T62	CUT	T28	T21	T27	T59
LPGA Championship	T10	CUT	T57	CUT	CUT	T46	T58	T48	T61	T14
U.S. Women's Open	CUT		T29	T31		T30	8	CUT	CUT	T32
du Maurier Classic	T68	T61	T13	CUT		T14	CUT	CUT	T59	T57

Tournament	1991	1992	1993	1994	1995	1996	1997	1998	1999	2000
Kraft Nabisco Championship	T6	T51	CUT	T36	T73	T41	CUT	CUT	T43	
LPGA Championship	T37	T52	CUT	CUT	CUT	T51	CUT	CUT	T47	
U.S. Women's Open					T57	CUT		CUT		
du Maurier Classic	T57		T42	1	CUT	T69	T41	T54	CUT	

Tournament	2001	2002	2003	2004	2005	2006	2007	2008	2009	2010
Kraft Nabisco Championship										
LPGA Championship										
U.S. Women's Open								CUT		CUT
Women's British Open ^										

^ The Women's British Open replaced the du Maurier Classic as an LPGA major in 2001.

Win
Top 10
Did not play

CUT = missed the half-way cut.
T = tied

=== Summary ===
Tournament	Wins	2nd	3rd	Top-5	Top-10	Top-25	Events	Cuts made
Kraft Nabisco Championship	0	0	0	0	1	2	17	13
LPGA Championship	0	0	0	0	1	2	22	12
U.S. Women's Open	0	0	0	0	1	1	14	7
du Maurier Classic	1	0	0	1	1	3	19	13
Women's British Open	0	0	0	0	0	0	0	0
Totals	1	0	0	1	4	8	72	45

- Most consecutive cuts made – 9 (1990 Nabisco – 1992 LPGA)
- Longest streak of top-10s – 1 (four times)

== Team appearances ==
Professional

- Handa Cup (representing the United States): 2006 (winners)
