= Lenore Muraoka =

American professional golfer (born 1955)

Personal information
- Full name: Lenore Muraoka Rittenhouse
- Nationality: United States
- Born: December 12, 1955 (age 70) Honolulu, Hawaii
- Height: 5 ft 3 in (1.60 m)

Career
- Sport: Golf
- College: University of Hawaiʻi
- Status: Professional
- Former tour: LPGA Tour (1980-2001)
- Professional wins: 1

Number of wins by tour
- LPGA Tour: 1

Best results in LPGA major championships
- Chevron Championship: T34: 1990
- Women's PGA C'ship: T21: 1988
- U.S. Women's Open: T27: 1986
- du Maurier Classic: T23: 1988
- Women's British Open: DNP

Lenore Muraoka Rittenhouse (born December 12, 1955) is an American professional golfer who played on the LPGA Tour. She played under her maiden name, Lenore Muraoka, until her marriage in 1987, and then under her married name, Lenore Rittenhouse.

Muraoka won once on the LPGA Tour in 1983.

Muraoka Rittenhouse was inducted into the Hawaii Sports Hall of Fame in 2010.

== Professional wins ==
=== LPGA Tour wins (1) ===
No.	Date	Tournament	Winning score	Margin of victory	Runners-up
1	May 15, 1983	United Virginia Bank Classic	−4 (70-73-69=212)	3 strokes	(United States) Stephanie Farwig (United States) Debbie Massey (United States) Alice Miller

LPGA Tour playoff record (0–1)

No.	Year	Tournament	Opponent	Result
1	1990	Boston Five Classic	(United States) Barb Mucha	Lost to birdie on second extra hole
