= 1997 LPGA Championship =

Tournament information
- Dates: May 15–18, 1997
- Location: Wilmington, Delaware; 39.789°N 75.564°W
- Course: DuPont Country Club
- Tour: LPGA Tour
- Format: Stroke play - 72 holes

Statistics
- Par: 71
- Length: 6,386 yards (5,839 m)
- Cut: 150 (+8)
- Prize fund: $1.2 million
- Winner's share: $180,000

Champion
- (United States) Christa Johnson
- 281 (−3), playoff
- Location in United States Location in Delaware

The 1997 LPGA Championship was the 43rd LPGA Championship, played May 15–18 at DuPont Country Club in Wilmington, Delaware.

Christa Johnson won her only major title in a sudden-death playoff over Leta Lindley. The win came with a par on the second extra hole, after both had players bogeyed the first. Johnson and Lindley were co-leaders after 54 holes. It was the first playoff at the LPGA Championship since 1970, then a full 18-hole round on Monday.

This was the fourth of eleven consecutive LPGA Championships at DuPont Country Club.

== Final leaderboard ==
Sunday, May 18, 1997

Place	Player	Score	To par	Money ($)
T1	(United States) Christa Johnson	68-73-69-71=281	−3	Playoff
T1	(United States) Leta Lindley	72-69-69-71=281	−3	Playoff
3	(Sweden) Annika Sörenstam	70-73-72-67=282	−2	81,519
T4	(England) Laura Davies	67-75-74-68=284	E	57,365
T4	(United States) Sherri Steinhauer	68-71-73-72=284	E	57,365
T6	(Canada) Dawn Coe-Jones	70-75-71-69=285	+1	38,947
T6	(Canada) Gail Graham	69-79-71-66=285	+1	38,947
8	(England) Trish Johnson	70-73-72-71=286	+2	31,400
T9	(United States) Barb Mucha	68-73-72-74=287	+3	26,871
T9	(Australia) Karrie Webb	71-79-70-67=287	+3	26,871

=== Playoff ===
Place	Player	Score	To par	Money ($)
1	(United States) Christa Johnson	5-4=9	+1	180,000
2	(United States) Leta Lindley	5-5=10	+2	111,711

- Sudden-death playoff held on holes 18 and 10.

==== Scorecard ====
Hole	18	10
Par	4	4
(United States) Johnson	5	4
(United States) Lindley	5	5

Bogey
