= Florida Department of Management Services =

Statewide regulatory entity in Florida

Florida Department of Management Services (DMS)
Agency overview
- Formed: 1992
- Preceding agency: Department of General Services
- Jurisdiction: State of Florida
- Headquarters: Tallahassee, Florida
- Motto: We Serve Those Who Serve Florida
- Employees: 800+
- Agency executive: Jonathan Satter, Secretary
- Child agencies: Division of State Group Insurance; Division of Retirement; Division of Real Estate Development and Management; Division of Telecommunications; Division of Human Resource Management; Division of State Purchasing; Division of Specialized Services
- Website: https://www.dms.myflorida.com/

The Florida Department of Management Services (DMS) is a department of the Florida government. Its primary mission is to support sister agencies and current and former state employees with workforce- and business-related functions so they can focus on their core missions as defined in law. The agency's motto is We Serve Those Who Serve Florida.

The head of the Department of Management Services is the Agency Secretary, who is appointed by the Governor and subject to confirmation by the Florida Senate. The position has no set term limit.

== Organization ==
The Department of Management Services (DMS) is a Governor's agency. The Secretary is responsible for planning, directing, coordinating, and executing the powers, duties, and functions vested in the agency, its divisions, bureaus, and other subunits. The DMS Chief of Staff oversees the Office of Communications, Legislative Affairs, the Office of Special Counsel, the Office of Information Technology, and Emergency Coordination. There is also a Senior Director of Special Projects and a Senior Director of Executive Operations.

The Department of Management Services is divided into two major service areas: Business Operations and Workforce Operations.

== Service areas ==
=== Workforce operations ===
==== Division of Human Resource Management ====
The Division of Human Resource Management (HRM) supports the state and its employees by providing effective and efficient human resource programs and services that attract, develop, retain and reward a high performance workforce. HRM establishes the policies, practices and strategies for the State Personnel System (SPS) within 31 Executive branch agencies, including 98,000 employees. In addition, HRM represents the Governor as the Chief Labor Negotiator for the SPS, negotiating wages, hours, and terms and conditions of employment with five labor unions representing 13 collective bargaining units covered by 10 contracts.

==== Division of Retirement ====
The Florida Department of Management Services' Division of Retirement administers retirement, disability or death benefits to state retirees or their beneficiaries. The division manages Florida's state-administered retirement systems, monitors Florida's local public retirement systems, oversees local police and fire pension funds in the state that participate, and oversees the State University System Optional Retirement Program and the Senior Management Service Optional Annuity Program.

The Division of Retirement provides access to all retirement account files maintained by the division for all members of the state-administered retirement system, which includes more than one million active, retired and inactive members of the Florida Retirement System (FRS) employed at all levels of government (state, counties, district school boards, universities, community colleges, cities, and special districts).

==== Division of State Group Insurance ====
The Division of State Group Insurance (DSGI) offers and manages a comprehensive package of health insurance benefits for active and retired state employees and their families, including: a variety of health insurance options; flexible spending and health savings accounts; life insurance; and dental, vision and other supplemental insurance products. The division, consisting of two bureaus, procures, manages and audits insurance vendor contracts and programs to meet customers' needs while remaining cost efficient.

==== People First ====
People First is the state's self-service, secure, web-based Human Resource Information System and enterprise-wide suite of human resource services. The main website used to access the People First system is https://peoplefirst.myflorida.com. The system currently supports more than 200,000 users.

=== Business operations ===
==== Real Estate Development and Management (REDM) ====
The Department of Management Services' Division of Real Estate Development and Management (REDM) is responsible for the overall management of the Florida Facilities Pool, as well as other facilities and structures the agency has been given responsibility to manage.

REDM has three bureaus with employees throughout Florida. The Bureau of Leasing administers public and private leasing. Leasing also oversees parking services statewide. The Bureau of Operations and Maintenance is responsible for daily operations of DMS-managed facilities, providing cost-efficient, accessible, clean and safe work environments. The Bureau of Building Construction oversees the construction of public buildings statewide, supplying project management oversight for DMS-managed facilities and for other agencies that may not employ the technical staff to perform these duties. Oversight of DMS-managed buildings involves the operation and maintenance of office, courtroom, laboratory, and other space, along with their adjacent grounds and parking facilities. REDM is also responsible for obtaining space for other Florida government departments.

==== Division of State Purchasing ====
Florida's purchasing power allows the Division of State Purchasing to deliver the best value in goods and services for state agencies and local governments. The division strives to develop and implement sound procurement practices throughout the state and is dedicated to building strong relationships with all state agencies, local governments, and vendors. The division promotes fair and open competition in the state's procurement process and provides professional leadership and guidance in understanding and using the best resources available.

The Division of State Purchasing's Professional Development program is designed to support the State of Florida's goal to achieve the best value for the state using the most effective, efficient, and economical practices in the industry. The program offers public purchasing training and certification for procurement professionals from state agencies and other eligible users.

MyFloridaMarketPlace (MFMP) is the State of Florida's award-winning e-Procurement system. The system, launched in 2013, is a source for centralized procurement activities, streamlining interactions between vendors and state government entities, and providing tools to support innovative procurement for the State of Florida.

The Office of Supplier Diversity (OSD) helps to improve business opportunities for Florida-based woman-, veteran-, and minority-owned small businesses. OSD manages a state certification program for eligible small businesses, maintains an online directory of certified business enterprises, and conducts outreach and training for small businesses to engage with government buyers across the state.

==== Division of Telecommunications (DivTel) ====
The Division of Telecommunications within the Department of Management Services serves Florida government and the people of Florida at the enterprise level in two broad categories:

1. Voice, data and conferencing telecommunications services for government under the brand name SUNCOM.
2. Planning, coordinating and fostering effective public safety Enhanced 911 (E911) and radio communications throughout the state at all levels of government.

==== Division of Specialized Services ====
This division has two bureaus. The Bureau of Fleet Management and Federal Property Assistance provides oversight of the state's fleet of motor vehicle and mobile equipment and is responsible for the federal surplus property program. The Bureau of Private Prison Monitoring manages the operational contracts for private correctional facilities and ensures vendors comply with contracts to improve the efficiency and effectiveness of corrections in Florida.

== History ==
The predecessor to DMS was the Department of General Services, created in 1969, which also administered the Office of Executive Clemency. The Division of Administrative Hearings and the Florida Commission on Human Relations were independent entities attached to the Department for administrative purposes. The Department originally administered the state personnel system for the Executive Branch, including recruitment, selection, job classification, pay, benefits, discipline, attendance, and leave; administered the Florida Retirement System; assisted veterans in receiving their benefits; bargained collectively on behalf of the Governor with state employee unions; and administered health insurance programs for all state employees.

In 1986, the Career Service Commission was dissolved. In 1992, the Department of General Services was renamed the Department of Management Services, and the Office of Executive Clemency was transferred to the Florida Parole Commission. The Department of Administration was abolished and most of its functions were transferred to the new Department of Management Services. The Florida Commission on Human Relations was transferred to the Office of the Governor.

This new agency, the Florida Department of Management Services, was formed to improve services and reduce administrative overhead. The agency motto is "We serve those who serve Florida."

== See also ==
FAPPO – The Florida Association of Public Procurement Officials
