= Beverly Klass =

American professional golfer

Personal information
- Nationality: United States
- Born: November 8, 1956 (age 69)
- Height: 5 ft 6 in (168 cm)

Career
- Sport: Golf
- College: Pierce College
- Turned professional: 1965/1976
- Former tour: LPGA Tour

Best results in LPGA major championships
- Chevron Championship: T38: 1984
- Women's PGA C'ship: T28: 1982
- U.S. Women's Open: T56: 1983
- du Maurier Classic: T5: 1982

Beverly Klass (born November 8, 1956) is an American professional golfer. She joined the LPGA Tour in 1976, and in 1984 she achieved career-best finishes at the West Virginia LPGA Classic and the San Jose Classic, with a second-place tie in both 1984 events. She also had a 5th-place finish at the 1982 Peter Jackson Classic. Klass currently holds the record for being the youngest person to ever compete in the U.S. Women's Open.

As a child, Klass was a golf phenom. At the age of eight, she won the 1964 National PeeWee Golf Championship by 65 strokes. During the 1965 LPGA Tour season, as a nine-year-old, Klass won $31. Over the next six years, after having her amateur status reinstated, she won over 25 city and state tournaments in California. In 1967, at the age of 10 years, 7 months, and 21 days, Klass became the youngest player to ever compete in the U.S. Women's Open.
