= 1999 Nabisco Dinah Shore =

Coordinates: 33.798°N 116.433°W

Tournament information
- Dates: March 25–28, 1999
- Location: Rancho Mirage, California
- Courses: Mission Hills Country Club; Dinah Shore Tourn. Course
- Tour: LPGA Tour
- Format: Stroke play - 72 holes

Statistics
- Par: 72
- Length: 6,460 yards (5,907 m)
- Field: 100 players, 80 after cut
- Cut: 149 (+5)
- Prize fund: $1.0 million
- Winner's share: $150,000

Champion
- (United States) Dottie Pepper
- 269 (−19)

Location in the United States
Location in California

The 1999 Nabisco Dinah Shore was a women's professional golf tournament, held March 25–28 at Mission Hills Country Club in Rancho Mirage, California. This was the 28th edition of the Kraft Nabisco Championship, and the seventeenth as a major championship.

Dottie Pepper, the 1992 champion, won the last of her two major titles, six strokes ahead of runner-up Meg Mallon. Pepper led by three strokes after 54 holes and shot a final round 66 (−6).

== Final leaderboard ==
Sunday, March 28, 1999

| Place | Player | Score | To par | Money ($) |
|---|---|---|---|---|
| 1 | (United States) Dottie Pepper | 70-66-67-66=269 | −19 | 150,000 |
| 2 | (United States) Meg Mallon | 66-69-71-69=275 | −13 | 93,093 |
| 3 | (Australia) Karrie Webb | 73-71-70-66=280 | −8 | 67,933 |
| 4 | (United States) Kelly Robbins | 69-73-67-72=281 | −7 | 52,837 |
| 5 | (Sweden) Charlotta Sörenstam | 72-68-76-66=282 | −6 | 42,772 |
| 6 | (United States) Juli Inkster | 72-66-71-74=283 | −5 | 35,224 |
| T7 | (Scotland) Catriona Matthew | 72-73-69-70=284 | −4 | 26,502 |
| T7 | (Scotland) Janice Moodie | 69-68-75-72=284 | −4 | 26,502 |
| T7 | (Sweden) Annika Sörenstam | 70-73-71-70=284 | −4 | 26,502 |
| T10 | (Sweden) Helen Alfredsson | 69-71-73-72=285 | −3 | 19,289 |
| T10 | (Sweden) Maria Hjorth | 77-68-68-72=285 | −3 | 19,289 |
| T10 | (United States) Sherri Steinhauer | 70-72-72-71=285 | −3 | 19,289 |
