= Vancouver Golf Club =

Golf club in Coquitlam, British Columbia

Coordinates: 49.251°N 122.878°W

- Location in Canada Location in British Columbia

Club information
- Location: Coquitlam, British Columbia, Canada
- Established: 1910, 116 years ago
- Type: Private
- Tota holes: 18
- Tournaments: Canadian Women's Open (1988, 1991, 2012, 2015)
- Website: vancouvergolfclub.com
- Designed by: H.T. (Mike) Gardner
- Par: 72
- Length: 6,800 yards (6,218 m) Longest hole is #6 - 620 yards
- Course rating: 72.6
- Slope rating: 131

Vancouver Golf Club, located in the Canadian city of Coquitlam, British Columbia, is the oldest golf club in the Lower Mainland.

Established 116 years ago in 1910, it opened the following year on a former sheep farm on the west side of Blue Mountain. The suburban club was originally considered to be far outside of the major population centre of Vancouver, requiring a trip on the British Columbia Electric Railway and often an overnight stay at the club. Today, the club is considered to be centrally located in the Lower Mainland.

The club has hosted the Canadian Women's Open four times on the LPGA Tour, in 1988, 1991, 2012, and 2015. The first two events were held as the du Maurier Classic, a women's major, and were won by Sally Little and Nancy Scranton, respectively. The 2012 edition was won by 15-year-old amateur Lydia Ko, then Lydia repeated in 2015 with a playoff win over Stacey Lewis. Vancouver Golf Club also hosted one Senior PGA Tour event in the 1985, the Canada Senior Open Championship, won by Peter Thomson of Australia.

The Club commissioned a 3.5 million cu. ft. Reservoir fed from an aquifer in 1996 to supply natural water to the golf course irrigation system.

== Scorecard ==
Hole	Name	Yards	Par	Hole	Name	Yards	Par
1	Mounds	396	4	10	Timbers	515	5
2	Creek	371	4	11	Tank	366	4
3	Pond	162	3	12	Short Hole	195	3
4	Hill	351	4	13	Tipperary	526	5
5	Maples	348	4	14	Blue Mtn.	380	4
6	Long Hole	620	5	15	Meadow	415	4
7	Shadows	192	3	16	Grave	405	4
8	Spring	372	4	17	Dogwood	398	4
9	Halfway	350	4	18	Donnybrook	438	4
Out		3,162	35	In		3,638	37
Source:				Total		6,800	72

== Criticism ==
The club became the subject of controversy in 2008 when it became known that a rule was implemented eight years earlier that required new members to be able to speak English, regardless of their ability to pay the $65,000 full-play membership fee. The club stated it did not forbid members from speaking other languages while on the grounds, but required the English proficiency in order to ensure that members could understood and abide by club rules.

== Notable members ==
- Doug Grimston, Vancouver Golf Club president and Canadian Amateur Hockey Association president

== See also ==
- List of golf courses in British Columbia
