= 2006 Legends Tour =

Golf tour season

The 2006 Legends Tour schedule featured four events showcasing professional women golfers aged 45 and older sanctioned by the LPGA Tour. Based in the United States, it is the official senior tour of the LPGA Tour. The tour was founded in 2000 by 25 veteran LPGA Tour players, and is intended to allow women to prolong their competitive golf careers on the model of the successful Champions Tour for men.

== Schedule and results ==
The Tour consisted of four events in 2006. The number in brackets after each winner's name is the number of Legends Tour events she had won up to and including that tournament.

Dates	Tournament	Location	Winner
Apr 15–16	World Ladies Senior Golf Open	Japan	(United States) Patty Sheehan (3)
Jun 24–25	Hy-Vee Classic	Iowa	(United States) Martha Nause (1)
Aug 5–6	BJ's Charity Championship	Massachusetts	(United States) Christa Johnson (1) & Nancy Scranton (1)
Dec 16–17	Handa Cup	Florida	(United States) Team USA

== See also ==
- Professional golf tours
