= Handa Cup =

Tournament information
- Location: 2015: Sarasota, Florida
- Established: 2006
- Course: 2015: Palm Aire Country Club
- Tour: Legends Tour
- Format: Stroke play matches since 2012

Current champion
- (United States) USA by 26 points to 22

The Handa Cup is a series of senior women's golf matches between a United States team and a World Team drawn from players from the rest of the world. It was founded in 2006 and is an event on the LPGA Legends Tour. Since 2013 it has been officially known as the ISPS Handa Cup, named after its sponsor, Haruhisa Handa.

The 2015 event was held on November 13–14 at Palm Aire Country Club, Sarasota, Florida.

The format is drawn from the Ryder Cup and similar team events, consisting of twelve players per side and a non-playing captain, usually a highly respected golf figure. The captains are responsible for pairing the teams in the pairs events, which consist of both alternate shot and best ball formats (also known as "foursome" and "four ball" matches respectively).

== Results ==
Year	Dates	Venue	Location	Winning team	Score	Losing team	U.S. captain	World captain
2015	Nov 13–14	Palm Aire Country Club	Florida	United States	26–22	World	Nancy Lopez	Sally Little
2014	Sep 27–28	Old Waverly Golf Club	Mississippi	United States	28–20	World	Nancy Lopez	Sally Little
2013	Oct 12–13	Hermitage Golf Course	Tennessee	World	27–21	United States	JoAnne Carner	Pia Nilsson
2012	Nov 3–4	Reunion Resort and Club	Florida	United States	24–24	World	JoAnne Carner	Pia Nilsson
2011	May 21–22	Wentworth by the Sea Country Club	New Hampshire	United States	34–14	World	Kathy Whitworth	Pia Nilsson
2010	Sep 4–5	Wentworth by the Sea Country Club	New Hampshire	United States	27–21	World	Kathy Whitworth	Catherine Panton-Lewis
2009	Dec 5–6	Slammer & Squire at World Golf Village	Florida	United States	28–20	World	Kathy Whitworth	Catherine Panton-Lewis
2008	Dec 5–6	Slammer & Squire at World Golf Village	Florida	United States	31–17	World	Kathy Whitworth	Catherine Panton-Lewis
2007	Dec 15–16	Slammer & Squire at World Golf Village	Florida	United States	26–22	World	Kathy Whitworth	Hisako Higuchi
2006	Dec 16–17	Slammer & Squire at World Golf Village	Florida	United States	27–11	World	Kathy Whitworth	Hisako Higuchi

== Format ==
The match is held over two days; Saturday and Sunday except in 2008 and 2015 when it was held on a Friday and Saturday. Pairs matches are played on the first day with single matches on the final day. Unlike most other team events, two points are awarded for a win and one point for a halved match. Until 2011 it was a match play event but from 2012 it changed to stroke play.

From 2014 the event has consisted of six best-ball matches on the first morning, six modified alternate shot matches on the first afternoon and 12 singles matches on the second day. The first day matches are over 9 holes while the second day matches are over 18 holes. All matches are stroke play. Two points are awarded to the winner of each match with 1 point each for a tied match.

== Appearances ==
=== United States ===
This is a complete list of golfers who have played for the United States.

- Amy Alcott: 2006, 2007, 2008, 2009, 2010
- Danielle Ammaccapane: 2015
- Pat Bradley: 2006, 2007, 2008, 2009, 2010, 2011, 2012, 2013, 2014, 2015
- JoAnne Carner: 2006, 2007, 2008, 2009, 2010, 2011
- Beth Daniel: 2007, 2008, 2009, 2010, 2011, 2012, 2013, 2014, 2015
- Cindy Figg-Currier: 2008, 2012, 2013
- Jane Geddes: 2006
- Sandra Haynie: 2006, 2007, 2008, 2009
- Pat Hurst: 2015
- Juli Inkster: 2014, 2015
- Christa Johnson: 2006, 2007, 2008, 2009, 2010, 2011, 2012, 2013, 2014, 2015
- Rosie Jones: 2006, 2007, 2008, 2009, 2010, 2011, 2012, 2013, 2014, 2015
- Betsy King: 2012, 2013
- Nancy Lopez: 2011, 2012, 2013
- Marilyn Lovander: 2006, 2007, 2008
- Meg Mallon: 2010, 2011, 2014, 2015
- Barb Mucha: 2013, 2014, 2015
- Martha Nause: 2006
- Cindy Rarick: 2006, 2007, 2008, 2009, 2010, 2011, 2012, 2013
- Michele Redman: 2011, 2015
- Laurie Rinker: 2013, 2014, 2015
- Nancy Scranton: 2007, 2009, 2010, 2011, 2012, 2013, 2014
- Patty Sheehan: 2006, 2007, 2008, 2009, 2010, 2011, 2012
- Val Skinner: 2014
- Sherri Steinhauer: 2010, 2011, 2012, 2014
- Kris Tschetter: 2015
- Sherri Turner: 2007, 2008, 2009, 2010, 2012, 2013, 2014
- Colleen Walker: 2009

=== World ===
This is a complete list of golfers who have played for the rest of the World team.

- (Sweden) Helen Alfredsson: 2012, 2013, 2014, 2015
- (Canada) Dawn Coe-Jones: 2006, 2007, 2008, 2009, 2010, 2011, 2012, 2014
- (Australia) Jane Crafter: 2010, 2012, 2013, 2014, 2015
- (England) Laura Davies: 2013, 2014, 2015
- (Peru) Alicia Dibos: 2006, 2007, 2008, 2009, 2010, 2011, 2012, 2013, 2014, 2015
- (Australia) Wendy Doolan: 2014, 2015
- (Brazil) Maria Alice Gonzalez: 2006, 2007
- (Canada) Gail Graham: 2009, 2010, 2011, 2012, 2013
- (Canada) Nancy Harvey: 2007, 2008, 2009, 2010, 2011
- (Japan) Masumi Inaba: 2008
- (Canada) Lorie Kane: 2010, 2011, 2012, 2013, 2014, 2015
- (England) Trish Johnson: 2013, 2014, 2015
- (Peru) (Sweden) Jenny Lidback: 2008, 2009, 2010, 2011, 2012, 2013, 2014, 2015
- (South Africa) Sally Little: 2007, 2009, 2010, 2011, 2012
- (Scotland) Catriona Matthew: 2015
- (Sweden) Liselotte Neumann: 2011, 2013, 2014, 2015
- (England) Alison Nicholas: 2008, 2009, 2010, 2011, 2012, 2013, 2014
- (Sweden) Catrin Nilsmark: 2012
- (Japan) Mieko Nomura: 2006, 2007, 2008, 2009, 2010, 2011, 2013, 2014, 2015
- (Japan) Michiko Okada: 2006, 2007, 2008, 2009
- (France) Anne Marie Palli: 2006, 2007, 2008, 2009, 2010, 2011, 2012
- (Scotland) Catherine Panton-Lewis: 2006
- (Canada) Barb Scherbak: 2006, 2007, 2008
- (Australia) Jan Stephenson: 2006, 2007, 2008, 2009, 2010, 2012, 2013, 2015
- (Japan) Aiko Takasu: 2009
- (Canada) Tina Tombs: 2008, 2011
- (Taiwan) Angie Tsai: 2006, 2007
- (Japan) Nayoko Yoshikawa: 2006, 2007
