= Tracy Kerdyk =

American professional golfer (born 1966)

Personal information
- Full name: Tracy L. Kerdyk
- Nationality: United States
- Born: March 5, 1966 (age 60) Coral Gables, Florida, U.S.
- Height: 5 ft 8 in (1.73 m)

Career
- Sport: Golf
- College: University of Miami
- Turned professional: 1988
- Former tour: LPGA Tour (1989–1999)
- Professional wins: 1

Number of wins by tour
- LPGA Tour: 1

Best results in LPGA major championships
- Chevron Championship: T19: 1996
- Women's PGA C'ship: T32: 1990
- U.S. Women's Open: T29: 1992, 1996
- du Maurier Classic: T22: 1995

Tracy L. Kerdyk (born March 5, 1966) is an American professional golfer who played on the LPGA Tour.

Kerdyk was born in Coral Gables, Florida. She had an impressive amateur career. In 1987, she won the U.S. Women's Amateur Public Links and was runner-up in the U.S. Women's Amateur. She played college golf at the University of Miami, where she won a record 11 times in 1988. She was a two-time All-American and 1988 NCAA Collegiate Player of the Year. She also played on the 1988 U.S. Curtis Cup team.

Kerdyk played on the LPGA Tour from 1989 to 1999 and won once.

Kerdyk was Vice President of New Business Development for the Futures Tour from 1999 until 2012. She is currently a realtor registered with Kerdyk Real Estate.

== Amateur wins ==
- 1982 American Junior Golf Classic
- 1983 Junior PGA Championship, Junior Orange Bowl, Doral Junior Championship
- 1987 Canadian Women's Amateur, U.S. Women's Amateur Public Links

== Professional wins ==
=== LPGA Tour wins (1) ===
No.	Date	Tournament	Winning score	Margin of victory	Runner-up
1	Sep 23, 1995	JAL Big Apple Classic	–11 (74-66-66-67=273)	4 strokes	(Sweden) Carin Koch

== Team appearances ==
Amateur

- Curtis Cup (representing the United States): 1988
