= 2010 Legends Tour =

The 2010 Legends Tour was a series of professional golf tour events for women aged 45 and older sanctioned by the Legends Tour. Based in the United States, it is an offshoot of the main U.S.-based women's tour, the LPGA Tour. The tour was founded in 2001, and is intended to allow women to prolong their competitive golf careers on the model of the successful Champions Tour for men.

== Schedule and results ==
The 2010 Legends Tour consisted of five events. The number in brackets after each winner's name is the number of Legends Tour events she had won up to and including that tournament.

| Dates | Tournament | Location | Winner |
|---|---|---|---|
| Apr 25 | Women's Senior National Invitational | Arizona | (United States) Nancy Scranton (3) |
| Aug 8 | Wendy's Charity Classic | Michigan | (United States) Cindy Figg-Currier (3) |
| Sep 4–5 | Handa Cup | New Hampshire | United States |
| Sep 22 | BJ's Charity Pro-Am; Unofficial | Massachusetts | (United States) Sherri Steinhauer (Jones course) (United States) Nancy Scranton (Nicklaus course) |
| Nov 20–21 | Legends Tour Open Championship | Florida | (United States) Rosie Jones (4) |
