= Friendly's Classic =

Golf tournament formerly on the LPGA Tour

The Friendly's Classic was a golf tournament on the LPGA Tour from 1995 to 1998. It was played at Crestview Country Club in Agawam, Massachusetts.

== Winners ==
- 1998 Amy Fruhwirth
- 1997 Deb Richard
- 1996 Dottie Pepper
- 1995 Becky Iverson
