= Rosie Jones (golfer) =

American professional golfer (born 1959)

Personal information
- Nationality: United States
- Born: November 13, 1959 (age 66) Santa Ana, California, U.S.
- Height: 5 ft 7 in (1.70 m)
- Spouse: Deb Edgemon (2024)

Career
- Sport: Golf
- College: Ohio State University
- Turned professional: 1982
- Current tour: Legends Tour (joined 2006)
- Former tour: LPGA Tour (joined 1982)
- Professional wins: 25

Number of wins by tour
- LPGA Tour: 13
- Ladies European Tour: 2
- Other: 10

Best results in LPGA major championships
- Chevron Championship: 2nd: 2005
- Women's PGA C'ship: 2nd: 1990
- U.S. Women's Open: 2nd: 1984
- du Maurier Classic: 2nd: 2000
- Women's British Open: T12: 2001

Achievements and awards
- AIAW All-American: 1981

Rosie Jones (born November 13, 1959) is an American professional golfer, with 13 LPGA Tour career victories and nearly $8.4 million in tournament earnings.

== Amateur career ==
Jones was born in Santa Ana, California. In her amateur career, she was a three time New Mexico Junior Champion (1974–76) and won the New Mexico State Championship in 1979.

Jones attended Ohio State University where in 1981 she was an AIAW All-American.

== Professional career ==
Jones qualified for the LPGA Tour by tying for seventh at the LPGA Final Qualifying Tournament in July 1982.

Jones's best position on the LPGA money list was third in 1988, when she was tied as the winning-most player with three victories, including the LPGA World Championship; she won that championship with a one-shot victory over Liselotte Neumann, that year's U.S. Open champion. She completed her career with thirteen LPGA Tour titles. She also played for the United States in the Solheim Cup seven times. She placed second in a major tournament four times (1984 U.S. Open; 1991 LPGA Championship; 2000 du Maurier Classic; 2005 Kraft Nabisco Championship), but never won a major tournament.

Jones achieved back-to-back wins in 1996-97 at the LPGA Corning Classic, earning her the nickname "Queen of Corning"; she is also that tournament's all-time money leader "by a wide margin."

I'm proud of my career. I wouldn't trade it for the world. I wish I'd won a major, but I gave it my whole heart on every shot. And I've gotten more from the game than I could ever give back.

— Jones, upon her retirement from the LPGA tour

At the conclusion of the 2006 U.S. Women's Open, in which she finished tied for 57th, she retired from competitive golf; as a symbol of her departure she removed her golf shoes, visor, and glove and placed them on the side of the 18th green.

Since retiring from full-time play, Jones has competed on the Legends Tour, winning two of the five non-team tournaments in 2007. She has also worked as a commentator for the Golf Channel. She came out of retirement in 2008 to play the Corning Classic on a sponsor's exemption. She missed the cut by four strokes.

In 2009, she qualified for the U.S. Women's Open; she missed the cut at the tournament by three strokes.

In February 2010, Jones was named the captain of the U.S. team for the 2011 Solheim Cup.

== Personal life ==
In 2004, Jones came out publicly as lesbian, an announcement timed with her acceptance of a sponsorship from Olivia, a travel agency that targets lesbians. Among people who knew her, she had been out since the late 1970s.

== Professional wins (25) ==
=== LPGA Tour wins (13) ===
No.	Date	Tournament	Winning score	Margin of victory	Runner(s)-up
1	Sep 7, 1987	Rail Charity Golf Classic	−8 (69-74-67-69=279)	1 stroke	(United States) Nancy Lopez
2	Apr 24, 1988	USX Golf Classic	−13 (67-69-69-70=275)	Playoff	(United States) Kathy Postlewait
3	Aug 28, 1988	Nestle World Championship	−9 (70-69-66-74=279)	1 stroke	(Sweden) Liselotte Neumann
4	Sep 25, 1988	Santa Barbara Open	−4 (70-70-72=212)	3 strokes	(United States) Missie McGeorge
5	Jun 2, 1991	Rochester International	−12 (69-69-72-66=276)	2 strokes	(United States) Danielle Ammaccapane (United States) Brandie Burton
6	Aug 30, 1995	Pinewild Women's Championship	−5 (72-70-69=211)	Playoff	(United States) Dottie Mochrie
7	May 26, 1996	LPGA Corning Classic	−12 (67-69-71-69=276)	2 strokes	(United States) Val Skinner
8	Jun 25, 1997	LPGA Corning Classic	−11 (72-69-71-65=277)	Playoff	(United States) Tammie Green
9	Jun 1, 1998	Wegmans Rochester International	−9 (74-69-64-72=279)	2 strokes	(United States) Juli Inkster
10	Aug 22, 1999	Firstar LPGA Classic	−9 (72-67-68=207)	Playoff	(United States) Becky Iverson (Australia) Jan Stephenson
11	Apr 29, 2001	Kathy Ireland Championship	−12 (66-67-68-67=268)	Playoff	(South Korea) Mi-Hyun Kim
12	Jul 22, 2001	Sybase Big Apple Classic	−12 (70-66-66-70=272)	1 stroke	(United States) Laura Diaz
13	May 11, 2003	Asahi Ryokuken International Championship	−15 (66-68-69-70=273)	3 strokes	(United States) Wendy Ward

LPGA Tour playoff record (5–4)

No.	Year	Tournament	Opponent(s)	Result
1	1984	Rochester International	(United States) Kathy Whitworth	Lost to par on first extra hole
2	1988	USX Golf Classic	(United States) Kathy Postlewait	Won with birdie on first extra hole
3	1992	Crestar Classic	(United States) Juli Inkster (United States) Betsy King (United States) Nancy Lopez	Inkster won with eagle on first extra hole
4	1991	Safeco Classic	(United States) Pat Bradley	Lost to birdie on second extra hole
5	1995	Pinewild Women's Championship	(United States) Dottie Mochrie	Won with birdie on fifth extra hole
6	1997	LPGA Corning Classic	(United States) Tammie Green	Won with birdie on first extra hole
7	1998	Standard Register PING	(Sweden) Liselotte Neumann	Lost to birdie on third extra hole
8	1999	Firstar LPGA Classic	(United States) Becky Iverson (Australia) Jan Stephenson	Won with par on fourth extra hole Stephenson eliminated by par on first hole
9	2001	Kathy Ireland Championship	(South Korea) Mi-Hyun Kim	Won with birdie on first extra hole

=== Ladies European Tour (2) ===
No.	Date	Tournament	Winning score	Margin of victory	Runner-up
1	May 14, 1982	United Friendly Worthing Open	−2 (73-73-71=217)	6 strokes	(England) Mickey Walker
2	Jul 23, 1982	Ladies Spanish Open	+8 (76-74-74=224)	5 strokes	(England) Jenny Lee Smith

=== Other wins (1) ===
- 1997 Gillette Tour Challenge (with Juli Inkster)

=== Legends Tour wins (9) ===
- 2007 Wendy's Charity Challenge, Legends Tour Open Championship
- 2009 Kinoshita Pearl Classic
- 2010 Legends Tour Open Championship
- 2012 Walgreens Charity Classic
- 2013 Harris Golf Charity Classic
- 2014 Wendy's Charity Challenge
- 2017 Wendy's Charity Classic
- 2019 BJ's Charity Championship (with Michele Redman)

== Results in LPGA majors ==
Tournament	1981	1982	1983	1984	1985	1986	1987	1988	1989
Kraft Nabisco Championship				T52	T19	T24	4	3	CUT
LPGA Championship			T44	T46	T19	T15	T3	T35	T61
U.S. Women's Open	T43		T11	2	53	T35	T9	T19	T57
du Maurier Classic			4	T28	T29	7	3	8	T46

Tournament	1990	1991	1992	1993	1994	1995	1996	1997	1998	1999	2000
Kraft Nabisco Championship	T6	T23	T32	T62		T52	T10	CUT	T18	T13	T8
LPGA Championship	2	T11	T35	T17	CUT	T33	T69	CUT	CUT	T5	T28
U.S. Women's Open	T16	T62	T25	CUT	CUT	T5	T29	T33	T19	T25	T4
du Maurier Classic	T61	T6	T50	T25	T16	T16	T10	T7	T22	T9	2

Tournament	2001	2002	2003	2004	2005	2006	2007	2008	2009
Kraft Nabisco Championship	T28	T3	T11	T8	2	CUT			
LPGA Championship	T12	CUT	T3		T31	T49			
U.S. Women's Open	T39	T22	9	T20	T19	T57			CUT
Women's British Open	T12	CUT		CUT	CUT				

Top 10
Did not play

CUT = missed the half-way cut
"T" = tied

=== Summary ===
Tournament	Wins	2nd	3rd	Top-5	Top-10	Top-25	Events	Cuts made
ANA Inspiration	0	1	2	4	8	14	22	19
U.S. Women's Open	0	1	0	3	5	14	26	23
Women's PGA Championship	0	1	2	4	4	9	23	19
Women's British Open	0	0	0	0	0	1	4	1
du Maurier Classic	0	1	1	3	9	13	18	18
Totals	0	4	5	14	26	51	93	80

- Most consecutive cuts made – 23 (1981 U.S. Women's Open – 1988 du Maurier Classic)
- Longest streak of top-10s – 6 (1986 du Maurier Classic – 1988 Kraft Nabisco)

== LPGA Tour career summary ==
Year	LPGA wins	Earnings ($)	Money list rank	Average
1982	0	2,869	127	74.5
1983	0	64,955	27	73.57
1984	0	81,793	19	73.27
1985	0	66,665	30	72.87
1986	0	71,399	33	72.72
1987	1	188,000	10	71.91
1988	3	323,392	3	71.57
1989	0	110,671	32	72.45
1990	0	353,832	6	71.48
1991	1	281,089	12	71.87
1992	0	204,096	25	71.64
1993	0	320,964	11	71.85
1994	0	123,683	42	72.22
1995	1	426,957	10	71.64
1996	1	275,592	18	71.76
1997	1	381,236	15	71.77
1998	1	395,241	18	71.51
1999	1	583,796	9	70.99
2000	0	643,054	9	71.21
2001	2	785,010	6	70.51
2002	0	722,412	10	70.76
2003	1	808,785	10	70.29
2004	0	473,616	25	71.22
2005	0	615,499	20	71.58

== Team appearances ==
Professional

- Solheim Cup (representing the United States): 1990 (winners), 1996 (winners), 1998 (winners), 2000, 2002 (winners), 2003, 2005 (winners)
- Handa Cup (representing the United States): 2006 (winners), 2007 (winners), 2008 (winners), 2009 (winners), 2010 (winners), 2011 (winners), 2012 (tie, Cup retained), 2013, 2014 (winners), 2015 (winners)

== See also ==
- List of golfers with most LPGA Tour wins
