= Dale Eggeling =

American professional golfer (born 1954)

Personal information
- Full name: Karen Dale Lundquist Eggeling
- Nationality: United States
- Born: April 21, 1954 (age 72) Statesboro, Georgia, U.S.
- Height: 5 ft 5.5 in (1.66 m)

Career
- Sport: Golf
- College: Miami Dade Community College; University of South Florida
- Status: Professional
- Former tours: LPGA Tour (1976–2004); Legends Tour
- Professional wins: 4

Number of wins by tour
- LPGA Tour: 3
- Other: 1

Best results in LPGA major championships
- Chevron Championship: 3rd: 1984
- Women's PGA C'ship: T8: 1983
- U.S. Women's Open: T13: 1982
- du Maurier Classic: T7: 1982
- Women's British Open: DNP

Karen Dale Eggeling (born April 21, 1954) is an American professional golfer who played on the LPGA Tour. She also played under her maiden name of Dale Lundquist.

== Career ==
Eggeling won three times on the LPGA Tour between 1980 and 1998.

== Professional wins (4) ==
=== LPGA Tour wins (3) ===
No.	Date	Tournament	Winning score	Margin of victory	Runner(s)-up
1	Jun 15, 1980	Boston Five Classic	–12 (68-70-66-72=276)	3 strokes	(United States) Amy Alcott
2	Jun 4, 1995	Oldsmobile Classic	–14 (63-69-71-71=274)	2 strokes	(United States) Elaine Crosby (United States) Meg Mallon (Sweden) Annika Sörenstam
3	Feb 15, 1998	Los Angeles Women's Championship	–3 (72-69=141)	Playoff	(Japan) Hiromi Kobayashi

LPGA Tour playoff record (1–1)

No.	Year	Tournament	Opponent	Result
1	1990	Oldsmobile LPGA Classic	(United States) Pat Bradley	Lost to birdie on first extra hole
2	1998	Los Angeles Women's Championship	(Japan) Hiromi Kobayashi	Won with birdie on first extra hole

=== Other wins (1) ===
- 1982 Florida Women's Open
