= Oldsmobile Classic =

Golf tournament formerly on the LPGA Tour

The Oldsmobile Classic was a golf tournament on the LPGA Tour from 1992 to 2000. It was played at Walnut Hills Country Club in East Lansing, Michigan.

== Winners ==
- 2000 Karrie Webb
- 1999 Dottie Pepper
- 1998 Lisa Walters
- 1997 Pat Hurst
- 1996 Michelle McGann
- 1995 Dale Eggeling
- 1994 Beth Daniel
- 1993 Jane Geddes
- 1992 Barb Mucha
