= Pinewild Women's Championship =

Golf tournament

The Pinewild Women's Championship was a golf tournament on the LPGA Tour, played only in 1995. It was played at the Pinewild Country Club of Pinehurst in Pinehurst, North Carolina. Rosie Jones was the winner, beating Dottie Pepper on the first hole of a sudden-death playoff.
