= Dottie Pepper =

American golfer and sports broadcaster (born 1965)

Personal information
- Nationality: United States
- Born: August 17, 1965 (age 61) Saratoga Springs, New York, U.S.
- Height: 5 ft 5 in (1.65 m)

Career
- Sport: Golf
- College: Furman University
- Turned professional: 1988
- Former tour: LPGA Tour (1988–2004)
- Professional wins: 25

Number of wins by tour
- LPGA Tour: 17
- LPGA of Japan Tour: 1
- Epson Tour: 1
- Other: 6

Best results in LPGA major championships (wins: 2)
- Chevron Championship: Won: 1992, 1999
- Women's PGA C'ship: T5: 1992
- U.S. Women's Open: 3rd/T3: 1988, 1990, 2001
- du Maurier Classic: 4th: 1993
- Women's British Open: T24: 2003

Achievements and awards
- LPGA Tour Money Winner: 1992
- LPGA Tour Player of the Year: 1992
- LPGA Vare Trophy: 1992
- GWAA Female Player of the Year: 1992
- Best Female Golfer ESPY Award: 1993
- GWAA William D. Richardson Award: 2016
- New York State Golf Assoc. Hall of Fame: 2018
- Old Tom Morris Award: 2024

Dottie Pepper (born August 17, 1965) is an American professional golfer and television golf broadcaster. From 1988 to 1995 she competed as Dottie Mochrie, which was her married name before a divorce. She won two major championships and 17 LPGA Tour events in all.

== Early life and amateur career ==
In 1965, Pepper was born in Saratoga Springs, New York. Her father, Don Pepper, was a major league baseball player who appeared on the cover of Sports Illustrated as a "rookie to watch" along with Hall of Famer Johnny Bench, in 1968.

Her career began with big amateur victories in her home state of New York. She won the 1981 state amateur and the 1981 and 1983 New York Junior Amateur titles. She was a member of the 1981 Junior World Cup team and low amateur at the 1984 U.S. Women's Open. She attended Furman University where she earned five collegiate victories and was named All-American three times.

== Professional career ==
In 1988, Pepper turned professional. She joined the LPGA Tour in 1988 and won 17 official events on the Tour, including two major championships: the 1992 and 1999 Nabisco Dinah Shore. Her 19-under-par finish in the 1999 victory still stands as the lowest score in relation to par in a major championship. She topped the money list in 1992 and finished in the top ten in ten of eleven seasons between 1991 and 2001. Pepper also played for the United States in the Solheim Cup six times.

Due to injury problems, Pepper played only one tournament in 2002. In July 2004, she announced that she would retire at the end of the season. In 2005, she began work as a golf commentator for NBC and the Golf Channel, reporting on both men's and women's events.

During the 2007 Solheim Cup, Pepper caused some stir while working as commentator for the Golf Channel. She called the American team "choking freaking dogs". She thought the network had cut to commercial when the comment was uttered, but it was actually still broadcasting live. Some players and fans were upset by this and Pepper quickly apologized for her "poor choice of words".

In July 2012, Pepper was named by captain Meg Mallon as one of two assistant captains for the U.S. Team at the 2013 Solheim Cup.

Pepper retired from commentating in December 2012, tired of the traveling and wanting to spend more time promoting junior golf as a PGA of America board member. In May 2013, she signed a contract with ESPN to return to commentating on a limited basis, working mainly major tournaments on the PGA, LPGA and Champions Tours. In October 2015, Pepper was signed to a contract with CBS, replacing David Feherty who had left the network to work for NBC and to continue his Feherty series on the Golf Channel. She took up Feherty's role as on-course reporter as well as doing occasional tower announcing.

Pepper served as a member of the PGA of America Board of Directors from 2012 to 2015, and the NENY PGA Board of Directors from 2009 to 2015.

== Personal life ==
Pepper resides in Saratoga Springs, New York with her third husband, golf writer and historian David Normoyle. They were married in May 2010.

== Awards and honors ==
- In 1992, she earned a number of prestigious award on the LPGA: she led the money list, won LPGA Player of the Year honors, and won the Vare Trophy, given to the player with the lowest scoring average over the course of the season.
- In 1993, she earned the ESPY Award for best female golfer.
- In 2016, Pepper was the recipient of the William D. Richardson Award, presented by the Golf Writers Association of America for her consistently outstanding contributions to golf.
- In 2018, she was inducted into the New York State Golf Association Hall of Fame.
- In 2024, the Golf Course Superintendents Association of America awarded Pepper with its highest honor, the Old Tom Morris Award, for her continuing lifetime commitment to the game of golf, and helping mold the welfare of the game in a manner and style exemplified by Old Tom Morris.

== Professional wins (25) ==
=== LPGA Tour wins (17) ===
No.	Date	Tournament	Winning score	Margin of victory	Runner(s)-up
1	Jan 29, 1989	Oldsmobile LPGA Classic	−9 (69-74-67-69=279)	Playoff	(United States) Beth Daniel
2	May 13, 1990	Crestar Classic	−16 (67-65-68=200)	9 strokes	(United States) Chris Johnson
3	Mar 29, 1992	**Nabisco Dinah Shore**	−9 (69-71-70-69=279)	Playoff	(United States) Juli Inkster
4	Apr 19, 1992	Sega Women's Championship	−11 (70-69-68-70=277)	1 stroke	(United States) Danielle Ammaccapane
5	Aug 2, 1992	Welch's Classic	−10 (72-67-69-70=278)	3 strokes	(United States) Stephanie Farwig
6	Aug 30, 1992	Sun-Times Challenge	Even (71-72-73=216)	Playoff	(United States) Beth Daniel (United States) Judy Dickinson
7	Oct 19, 1993	World Championship of Women's Golf	−4 (72-71-69-72=284)	1 stroke	(United States) Donna Andrews (United States) Meg Mallon (United States) Michelle McGann (United States) Sherri Steinhauer
8	Mar 5, 1994	Chrysler-Plymouth Tournament of Champions	−1 (72-75-71-69=287)	2 strokes	(United States) Nancy Lopez (United States) Lauri Merten
9	Mar 12, 1995	PING/Welch's Championship (Tucson)	−10 (70-68-72-68=278)	3 strokes	(United States) Cindy Rarick (Sweden) Annika Sörenstam
10	Aug 6, 1995	McCall's LPGA Classic	−12 (69-67-68=204)	3 strokes	(United States) Kelly Robbins
11	Jun 23, 1996	Rochester International	−10 (69-66-71=206)	2 strokes	(Sweden) Annika Sörenstam
12	Jun 30, 1996	ShopRite LPGA Classic	−11 (67-66-69=202)	4 strokes	(United States) Amy Benz
13	Jul 21, 1996	Friendly's Classic	−9 (68-69-73-69=279)	1 stroke	(United States) Brandie Burton
14	Sep 8, 1996	Safeway LPGA Golf Championship	−14 (65-70-67=202)	2 strokes	(United States) Chris Johnson
15	Mar 28, 1999	**Nabisco Dinah Shore**	−19 (70-66-67-66=269)	6 strokes	(United States) Meg Mallon
16	Aug 29, 1999	Oldsmobile Classic	−18 (67-63-70-70=270)	2 strokes	(United States) Kelli Kuehne
17	Nov 19, 2000	Arch Wireless Championship	−9 (68-71-69-71=279)	3 strokes	(Australia) Rachel Hetherington

LPGA Tour playoff record (3–5)

No.	Year	Tournament	Opponent(s)	Result
1	1989	Oldsmobile LPGA Classic	(United States) Beth Daniel	Won with par on fifth extra hole
2	1992	**Nabisco Dinah Shore**	(United States) Juli Inkster	Won with par on first extra hole
3	1992	Sun-Times Challenge	(United States) Beth Daniel (United States) Judy Dickinson	Pepper won with par on sixth extra hole Daniel eliminated by par on fourth hole
4	1993	PING/Welch's Championship (Massachusetts)	(United States) Missie Berteotti	Lost to birdie on fifth extra hole
5	1993	State Farm Rail Classic	(England) Helen Dobson	Lost to birdie on fifth extra hole
6	1995	Pinewild Women's Championship	(United States) Rosie Jones	Lost to birdie on first extra hole
7	1998	Star Bank LPGA Classic	(United States) Meg Mallon	Lost to par on first extra hole
8	2000	AFLAC Champions	(Australia) Karrie Webb	Lost to par on first extra hole

LPGA majors are shown in bold.

=== Futures Tour wins (1) ===
- 1985 Albany-Colonie Chamber Open (as an amateur)

=== LPGA of Japan Tour wins (1) ===
- 1989 Karuizawa 72 Tokyu Ladies Open

=== Other wins (6) ===
- 1992 JCPenney Classic (with Dan Forsman)
- 1995 JCPenney/LPGA Skins Game
- 1996 Diners Club Matches (with Juli Inkster)
- 1997 Diners Club Matches (with Juli Inkster)
- 1999 Diners Club Matches (with Juli Inkster)
- 2000 Hyundai Team Matches (with Juli Inkster)

== Major championships ==
=== Wins (2) ===
Year	Championship	Winning score	Margin	Runner-up
1992	Nabisco Dinah Shore	−9 (69-71-70-69=279)	Playoff ^{1}	(United States) Juli Inkster
1999	Nabisco Dinah Shore	−19 (70-66-67-66=269)	6 strokes	(United States) Meg Mallon

^{1} Defeated Inkster with par on first extra hole.

=== Results timeline ===
Tournament	1984	1985	1986	1987	1988	1989
Kraft Nabisco Championship					T7	T66
LPGA Championship					T45	T39
U.S. Women's Open	T22	T55	78	T12	T3	T5
du Maurier Classic					T35	T18

Tournament	1990	1991	1992	1993	1994	1995	1996	1997	1998	1999	2000
Kraft Nabisco Championship	T11	2	1	T30	T19	T11	T23	T11	T9	1	2
LPGA Championship	T53	T22	T5	T30	T11	T6	T26	T37	CUT	T19	T23
U.S. Women's Open	T3	T5	T6	T17	T12	T13	CUT	T14	T11	T14	WD
du Maurier Classic	T27	T6	T20	4	T14	T12		T27	T14	T34	

Tournament	2001	2002	2003	2004
Kraft Nabisco Championship	T2		T51	T24
LPGA Championship	T17		T67	T70
U.S. Women's Open	3	WD	WD	
Women's British Open ^	CUT		T24	

^ The Women's British Open replaced the du Maurier Classic as an LPGA major in 2001.

Win
Top 10
Did not play

CUT = missed the half-way cut
WD = withdrew
"T" = tied

=== Summary ===
Tournament	Wins	2nd	3rd	Top-5	Top-10	Top-25	Events	Cuts made
Kraft Nabisco Championship	2	3	0	5	7	13	16	16
LPGA Championship	0	0	0	1	2	7	16	15
U.S. Women's Open	0	0	3	5	6	14	20	16
du Maurier Classic	0	0	0	1	2	7	11	11
Women's British Open	0	0	0	0	0	1	2	1
Totals	2	3	3	12	17	42	65	59

- Most consecutive cuts made – 38 (1984 U.S. Open – 1996 LPGA)
- Longest streak of top-10s – 5 (1991 U.S. Open – 1992 U.S. Open)

== Team appearances ==
Amateur

- Curtis Cup (representing the United States): 1986

Professional

- Solheim Cup (representing the United States): 1990 (winners), 1992, 1994 (winners), 1996 (winners), 1998 (winners), 2000

=== Solheim Cup record ===
Year	Total matches	Total W-L-H	Points won	Points %
Career	20	13–5–2	14	70%
1990	3	2–1–0	2	67%
1992	3	0–2–1	0.5	17%
1994	3	3–0–0	3	100%
1996	4	3–1–0	3	75%
1998	4	4–0–0	4	100%
2000	3	1–1–1	1.5	50%

== See also ==
- List of golfers with most LPGA Tour wins
