= Michelle McGann =

American professional golfer (born 1969)

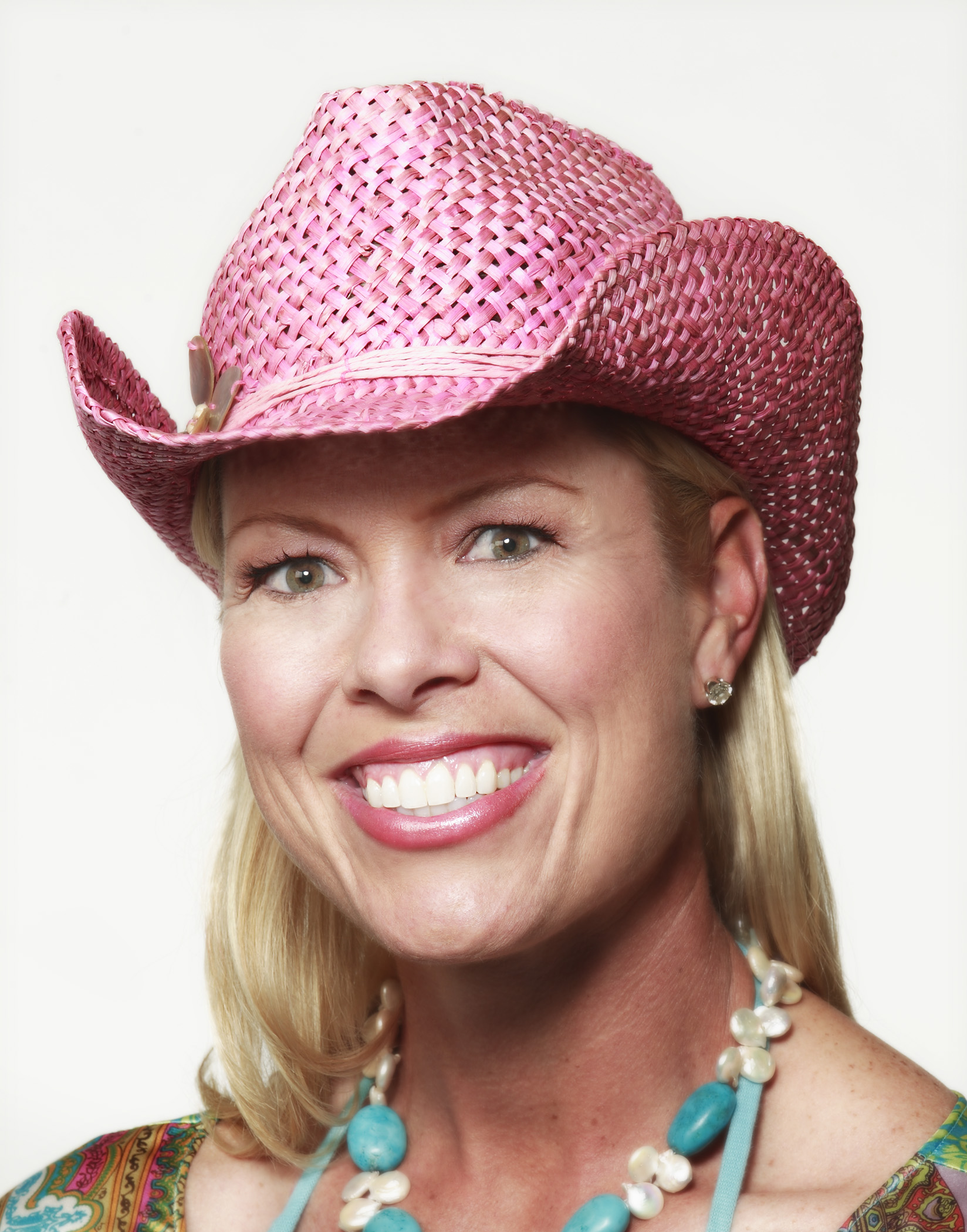
- McGann in 2007

Personal information
- Nationality: United States
- Born: December 30, 1969 (age 56) West Palm Beach, Florida, U.S.
- Height: 5 ft 11 in (1.80 m)
- Spouse: Jonathan Satter (m. 2010)

Career
- Sport: Golf
- Turned professional: 1989
- Current tour: LPGA Tour (joined 1989)
- Professional wins: 9

Number of wins by tour
- LPGA Tour: 7
- LPGA of Japan Tour: 1
- Other: 1

Best results in LPGA major championships
- Chevron Championship: 5th: 1994
- Women's PGA C'ship: T4: 1993
- U.S. Women's Open: T6: 1992
- du Maurier Classic: 2nd: 1994
- Women's British Open: CUT: 2001, 2002

Michelle McGann (born December 30, 1969) is an American professional golfer who plays on the LPGA Tour.

== Amateur career ==
Born in West Palm Beach, Florida, McGann was diagnosed with juvenile diabetes at age 13 and was a three-time Florida state junior champion. She won the 1987 U.S. Girls' Junior and was named American Junior Golf Association Rolex Junior Player of the Year.

Also in 1987, she was named a Rolex Junior First-Team All-American and was ranked as the nation's top amateur by Golf Magazine and Golf Digest. In 1988, McGann captured the Doherty Cup Championship title and played in the U.S. Women's Open and Boston Five Classic as an amateur.

== Professional career ==
McGann joined the LPGA Tour in 1989 and has seven LPGA career victories. She was a member of the 1994 (as a traveling alternate) and 1996 U.S. Solheim Cup teams and finished in the top-10 on the money list twice, seventh in 1995 and eighth in 1996.

== Health ==
McGann's career has long been hampered by her battle with type 1 diabetes and related effects.

== Endorsements ==
McGann has represented Cadillac, Bayer, Lynx, Lilly Pulitzer, Canon, and Tommy Bahama.

== Personal ==
McGann began using an insulin pump in 1999 and is the founder and chairperson of the Michelle McGann Fund, a 501c3 charity focused on diabetes education and awareness. She became engaged to Jonathan Satter, a business executive and political appointee, in July 2008, and they were married in May 2010 in Ogunquit, Maine. Satter and McGann reside in North Palm Beach, Florida. On June 4, 2010, McGann's nuptials were the focus story in the Sunday New York Times Vow feature.

== Philanthropy ==
McGann founded The Michelle McGann Fund, a 501c3 foundation focused on empowering children and families affected by a type 1 diabetes diagnosis. Since 2012, the fund has sent hundreds of under privileged children and young adults with a type 1 diabetes diagnosis to diabetes related summer camps around the country.

== Other ==
In September 2023, Florida Governor Ron DeSantis appointed McGann to the board of the Florida Sports Foundation, the official sports promotion and development organization for the state of Florida.

== Professional wins ==
=== LPGA Tour wins (7) ===
No.	Date	Tournament	Winning score	To par	Margin of victory	Runner(s)-up
1	May 7, 1995	Sara Lee Classic	69-65-68=202	−14	1 stroke	(England) Laura Davies (United States) Dottie Mochrie (United States) Kelly Robbins
2	Jul 2, 1995	Youngstown-Warren LPGA Classic	65-70-70=205	−11	Playoff	(United States) Katie Peterson-Parker
3	Jun 9, 1996	Oldsmobile Classic	71-66-70-65=272	−16	Playoff	(Sweden) Liselotte Neumann
4	Jul 14, 1996	Youngstown-Warren LPGA Classic (2)	71-64-65=200	−16	3 strokes	(United States) Kim Saiki
5	Sep 2, 1996	State Farm Rail Classic	69-65-68=202	−14	Playoff	(England) Laura Davies (United States) Barb Whitehead
6	Jan 19, 1997	HealthSouth Inaugural	66-72-69=207	−9	Playoff	(Australia) Karrie Webb
7	Jun 29, 1997	ShopRite LPGA Classic	72-65-64=201	−12	3 strokes	(Sweden) Annika Sörenstam

LPGA Tour playoff record (4–0)

No.	Year	Tournament	Opponent(s)	Result
1	1995	Youngstown-Warren LPGA Classic	(United States) Katie Peterson-Parker	Won with birdie on third extra hole
2	1996	Oldsmobile Classic	(Sweden) Liselotte Neumann	Won with birdie on third extra hole
3	1996	State Farm Rail Classic	(England) Laura Davies (United States) Barb Whitehead	Won with birdie on third extra hole
4	1997	HealthSouth Inaugural	(Australia) Karrie Webb	Won with par on first extra hole

=== LPGA of Japan Tour (1) ===
- 1995 Takara World Invitational

=== Other (1) ===
- 1998 Gillette Tour Challenge Championship (with Lee Trevino and Jim Furyk)

== Team appearances ==
Professional

- Solheim Cup (representing the United States): 1996 (winners)
