= Nancy Scranton =

American professional golfer (born 1961)

Personal information
- Full name: Nancy Scranton
- Nationality: United States
- Born: April 26, 1961 (age 65) Centralia, Illinois, U.S.

Career
- Sport: Golf
- College: Florida State University; University of Kentucky
- Turned professional: 1985
- Former tour: LPGA Tour (1985–2008)
- Professional wins: 9

Number of wins by tour
- LPGA Tour: 3
- Epson Tour: 1
- Other: 5

Best results in LPGA major championships (wins: 1)
- Chevron Championship: T6: 1991
- Women's PGA C'ship: T3: 1999, 2000
- U.S. Women's Open: T16: 1988
- du Maurier Classic: Won: 1991
- Women's British Open: CUT: 2001, 2002

Achievements and awards
- LPGA Heather Farr Player Award: 1999

Nancy Scranton (born April 26, 1961) is an American professional golfer.

== Career ==
Scranton was born in Centralia, Illinois. She attended Florida State University and the University of Kentucky.

Her rookie season on the LPGA Tour was 1985. She has three tournament victories on the tour, including one major championship, the 1991 du Maurier Classic. Her best money list finish was 16th in 1991. She was a member of the United States team at the 2000 Solheim Cup.

== Professional wins (9) ==
=== LPGA Tour wins (3) ===
Legend
LPGA Tour major championships (1)
Other LPGA Tour (2)

No.	Date	Tournament	Winning score	Margin of victory	Runner-up
1	Sep 15, 1991	du Maurier Classic	−9 (72-75-64-68=279)	3 strokes	(United States) Debbie Massey
2	Sep 27, 1992	Los Coyotes LPGA Classic	−9 (73-68-73-65=279)	1 stroke	(United States) Meg Mallon
3	Jan 23, 2000	Subaru Memorial of Naples	−13 (66-71-68-70=275)	Playoff	(Sweden) Maria Hjorth

LPGA Tour playoff record (1–0)

No.	Year	Tournament	Opponent	Result
1	2000	Subaru Memorial of Naples	(Sweden) Maria Hjorth	Won with par on second extra hole

=== Futures Tour wins (1) ===
- 1984 Willow Creek Classic

=== Legends Tour wins (5) ===
- 2006 BJ's Charity Championship (with Christa Johnson)
- 2007 BJ's Charity Championship (with Christa Johnson)
- 2010 Women's Senior National Invitational
- 2012 LPGA Legends Swing for the Cure
- 2013 Walgreens Charity Championship

== Major championships ==
=== Wins (1) ===
Year	Championship	Winning score	Margin	Runner-up
1991	du Maurier Classic	−9 (72-75-64-68=279)	3 strokes	(United States) Debbie Massey

=== Results timeline ===
Tournament	1985	1986	1987	1988	1989
Kraft Nabisco Championship			T47	T44	CUT
LPGA Championship	T19	DQ	T63	T52	T14
U.S. Women's Open		T19	CUT	T16	CUT
du Maurier Classic	CUT	T3	T53	T4	T7

Tournament	1990	1991	1992	1993	1994	1995	1996	1997	1998	1999	2000
Kraft Nabisco Championship	T59	T6	T57	T19	T17	CUT	CUT	CUT			T17
LPGA Championship	T27	CUT	T22	T8	T49	T18		T60	T25	T3	T3
U.S. Women's Open	T40	T21	CUT	CUT					T26	T30	T46
du Maurier Classic	CUT	1	T44	CUT	T64	CUT		77	T67	T26	CUT

Tournament	2001	2002	2003	2004	2005	2006	2007	2008
Kraft Nabisco Championship	T36	CUT	CUT	CUT	72		CUT	
LPGA Championship	T26	WD	CUT	CUT	T54	T29	T36	T58
U.S. Women's Open	CUT	CUT			T45	T46		
Women's British Open ^	CUT	CUT						

^ The Women's British Open replaced the du Maurier Classic as an LPGA major in 2001.

Win
Top 10
Did not play

CUT = missed the half-way cut
DQ = disqualified
WD = withdrew
"T" = tied

=== Summary ===
Tournament	Wins	2nd	3rd	Top-5	Top-10	Top-25	Events	Cuts made
Kraft Nabisco Championship	0	0	0	0	1	4	18	10
LPGA Championship	0	0	2	2	3	8	22	18
U.S. Women's Open	0	0	0	0	0	3	15	9
du Maurier Classic	1	0	1	3	4	4	15	10
Women's British Open	0	0	0	0	0	0	2	0
Totals	1	0	3	5	8	19	72	47

- Most consecutive cuts made – 11 (1997 U.S. Open – 2000 U.S. Open)
- Longest streak of top-10s – 1 (ten times)

== U.S. national team appearances ==
Professional

- Solheim Cup: 2000
- Handa Cup: 2007 (winners), 2009 (winners), 2010 (winners), 2011 (winners), 2012 (tie, Cup retained), 2013, 2014 (winners)
