= Christa Johnson =

American professional golfer (born 1958)

Personal information
- Full name: Christa Johnson
- Nationality: United States
- Born: April 25, 1958 (age 68) Arcata, California, U.S.
- Height: 5 ft 11 in (1.80 m)
- Spouse: Duane A. Bernard (m. 2007)

Career
- Sport: Golf
- College: University of Arizona
- Turned professional: 1980
- Current tour: Legends Tour (joined 2006)
- Former tour: LPGA Tour (1980–2008)
- Professional wins: 15

Number of wins by tour
- LPGA Tour: 9
- LPGA of Japan Tour: 1
- Other: 5

Best results in LPGA major championships (wins: 1)
- Chevron Championship: T5: 1987
- Women's PGA C'ship: Won: 1997
- U.S. Women's Open: T4: 1998
- du Maurier Classic: T5: 1986
- Women's British Open: DNP

Christa Johnson (born April 25, 1958) is an American professional golfer. She became a member of the LPGA Tour in 1980 and won nine LPGA Tour events, including one major championship, during her career.

== Amateur career ==
Born in Arcata, California, Johnson won the 1975 Northern California Junior Girls Championship and was honored as a member of the Northern California International Junior Cup Team. She attended the University of Arizona in Tucson, where she was an All-American from 1979–80 for the Wildcats.

== Professional career ==
Johnson joined the LPGA Tour in 1980. She won nine tournaments on the LPGA Tour, the first of them in 1984 and the last in 1997. Her one major championship title came at the 1997 McDonald's LPGA Championship. Her best money list finish was fourth, also in 1997. She won five tournaments on the Legends Tour, the official senior tour of the LPGA. She was a member of the USA Team during the 2006 through 2014 Handa Cups (USA winning in all years except 2013), official world team challenge of the senior tour.

Johnson resides in Arizona with husband, Duane A. Bernard, CEO of Phoenix Health Services, and former CEO of Specialty Health and St. Catherine Healthcare, whom she married in March 2007. Johnson also played under the name Chris Johnson from 1980 to 1985.

== Professional wins ==
=== LPGA Tour wins (9) ===
Legend
LPGA Tour major championships (1)
Other LPGA Tour (8)

No.	Date	Tournament	Winning score	Margin of victory	Runner(s)-up
1	Mar 11, 1984	Samaritan Turquoise Classic	−12 (67-68-69-72=276)	5 strokes	(United States) Patty Hayes
2	Mar 18, 1984	Tucson Conquistadores Open	−16 (69-71-66-66=272)	6 strokes	(United States) Lauri Peterson
3	Mar 17, 1986	GNA/Glendale Federal Classic	−4 (75-70-67=212)	2 strokes	(United States) Jane Geddes
4	Aug 2, 1987	Columbia Savings LPGA National Pro-Am	−11 (66-71-70-70=277)	5 strokes	(United States) Shirley Furlong
5	Jun 17, 1990	Atlantic City Classic	−5 (69-67-69-70=275)	2 strokes	(Scotland) Pamela Wright
6	Apr 7, 1991	PING/Welch's Championship	−15 (67-69-65-72=273)	4 strokes	(United States) Kris Tschetter
7	May 21, 1995	Star Bank LPGA Classic	−6 (68-75-67=210)	1 stroke	(United States) Juli Inkster
8	May 18, 1997	McDonald's LPGA Championship	−3 (68-73-69-71=281)	Playoff	(United States) Leta Lindley
9	Sep 7, 1997	Safeway LPGA Golf Championship	−10 (70-70-66=206)	1 stroke	(England) Lisa Hackney (United States) Kim Saiki

LPGA Tour playoff record (1–1)

No.	Year	Tournament	Opponent(s)	Result
1	1986	Mayflower Classic	(United States) Sandra Palmer (Australia) Jan Stephenson	Palmer won with birdie on first extra hole
2	1997	McDonald's LPGA Championship	(United States) Leta Lindley	Won with par on second extra hole

=== LPGA of Japan Tour wins (1) ===
- 1985 Yamaha Cup Ladies Open

=== Legends Tour wins (5) ===
- 2006 (1) BJ's Charity Championship (with Nancy Scranton)
- 2007 (1) BJ's Charity Championship (with Nancy Scranton)
- 2009 (1) Wendy's Charity Challenge
- 2011 (1) Patty Sheehan & Friends Legends Tour Event
- 2019 (1) Janesville LPGA Senior Pro-Am

== Major championships ==
=== Wins (1) ===
Year	Championship	Winning score	Margin	Runner-up
1997	McDonald's LPGA Championship	−3 (68-73-69-71=281)	Playoff ^{1}	(United States) Leta Lindley

^{1} Won in a sudden death playoff.

=== Results timeline ===
Tournament	1978	1979	1980
LPGA Championship			
U.S. Women's Open	CUT	CUT	
du Maurier Classic	–		

Tournament	1981	1982	1983	1984	1985	1986	1987	1988	1989	1990
Kraft Nabisco Championship	–	–	T44	T46	T26	T50	T5	T35	CUT	T34
LPGA Championship	T57	T26	T4	72	T8	T33	T16	CUT	T12	T20
U.S. Women's Open	T62	44	CUT	CUT	T12	T19	CUT	T19	T29	CUT
du Maurier Classic	T30		T13	T25	T6	T5	T70	T39	CUT	T41

Tournament	1991	1992	1993	1994	1995	1996	1997	1998	1999	2000
Kraft Nabisco Championship	T23	T17	T76	T19	T57	CUT	T35	CUT	T51	T6
LPGA Championship	T47	T15	T30	T14	T38	T58	1	T6	T54	CUT
U.S. Women's Open	T5	T48	T13	CUT	T16	T58	T9	T4	CUT	CUT
du Maurier Classic	T36	T44	T10	T47	CUT	T44	T9	T27		

Tournament	2001	2002	2003	2004	2005	2006	2007
Kraft Nabisco Championship	T48	T36					
LPGA Championship		67	CUT	CUT	WD	CUT	CUT
U.S. Women's Open				CUT			
Women's British Open ^							

^ The Women's British Open replaced the du Maurier Classic as an LPGA major in 2001.

Win
Top 10
Did not play

CUT = missed the half-way cut.
WD = withdrew
T = tied

=== Summary ===
Tournament	Wins	2nd	3rd	Top-5	Top-10	Top-25	Events	Cuts made
Kraft Nabisco Championship	0	0	0	1	2	5	20	17
LPGA Championship	1	0	0	2	4	9	26	19
U.S. Women's Open	0	0	0	2	3	8	23	13
du Maurier Classic	0	0	0	1	4	6	17	15
Women's British Open	0	0	0	0	0	0	0	0
Totals	1	0	0	6	13	28	86	64

- Most consecutive cuts made – 15 (1990 LPGA – 1994 LPGA)
- Longest streak of top-10s – 3 (1997 LPGA – 1997 du Maurier Classic)

== U.S. national team appearances ==
Professional

- Solheim Cup: 1998 (winners)
- Handa Cup: 2006 (winners), 2007 (winners), 2008 (winners), 2009 (winners), 2010 (winners), 2011 (winners), 2012 (tie, Cup retained), 2013, 2014 (winners), 2015 (winners)
