= List of Chevron Championship winners =

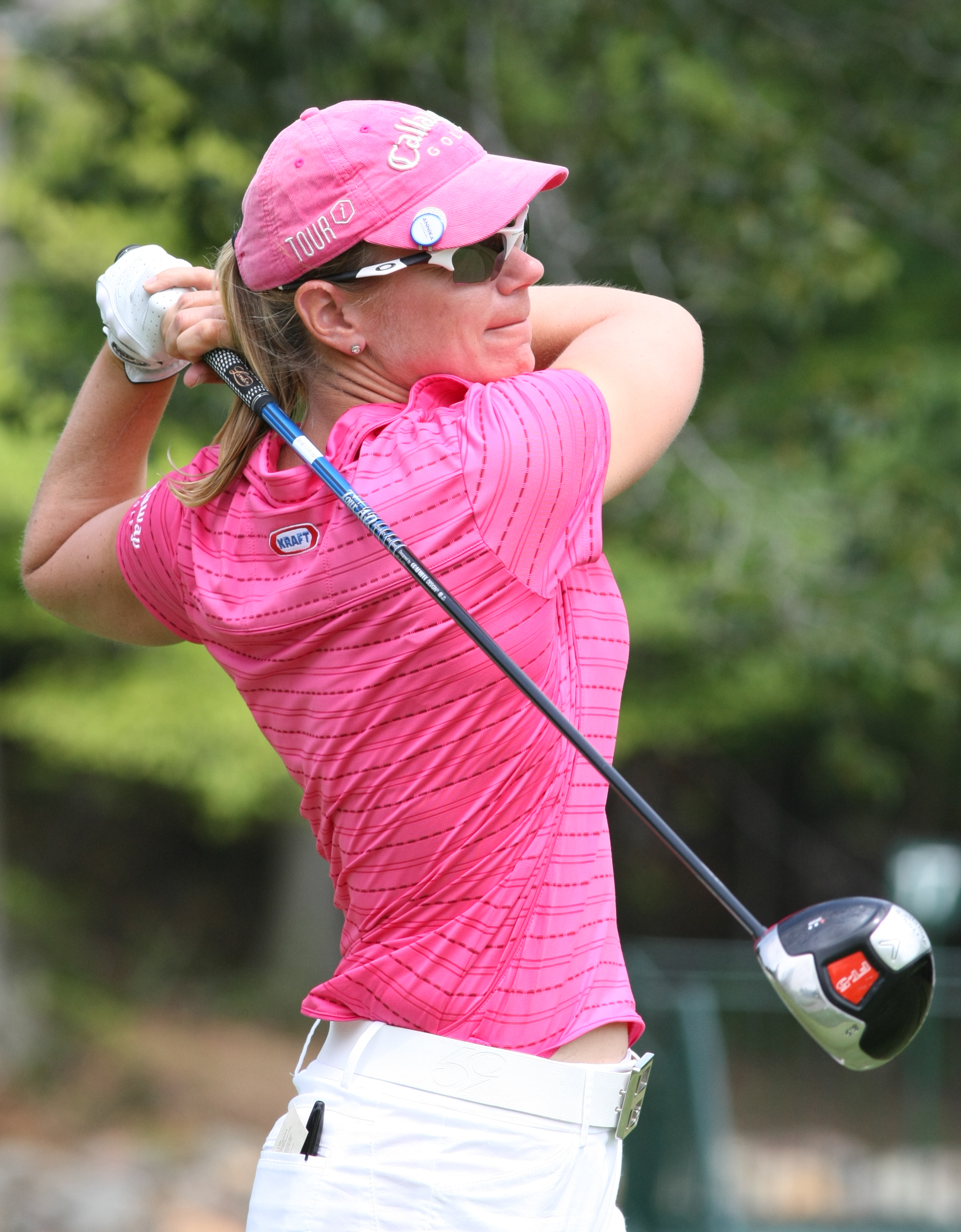
Annika Sörenstam won the event in 2001, 2002 and 2005; she is the only winner of consecutive Chevron Championship titles as a major championship.

The Chevron Championship^{[a]} is an annual women's golf competition. It was established in 1972, and became a women's major championship in 1983. It is one of the five women's majors played each year along with the Women's PGA Championship, the U.S. Women's Open, the Women's British Open, and The Evian Championship. The event has been conducted in stroke play competition since its establishment, and is the first women's major championship on the calendar each year. The event has only been staged at Mission Hills Country Club in Rancho Mirage, California.

The champions are presented with the "Dinah Shore Trophy", in honor of Shore, who promoted the Ladies Professional Golf Association (LPGA). In addition, she helped found the Chevron Championship, previously called the ANA Inspiration, and originally called the Colgate Dinah Shore tournament in her honor. Past champions are honored with a plaque on the walk-up to the 18th green that is called the "Dinah's Walk of Champions." Since 1994, champions have taken the plunge into "Poppie's Pond," which is named after the former tournament director Terry Wilcox. This first occurred in 1988, when Amy Alcott took the plunge, as a spontaneous act of celebration.

Amy Alcott, Betsy King, and Annika Sörenstam hold the record for the most victories with three each. Sörenstam is the only player to win back-to-back titles as a major, winning in both 2001 and 2002. As a non-major, Sandra Post won back-to-back titles in 1978 and 1979. The fewest strokes required to complete 72 holes in the tournament's history, and therefore the best winning score, is Dottie Pepper's 269, 19-under-par in 1999. The Chevron Championship has had seven wire-to-wire champions as a major, which are the following: Pat Bradley in 1986, King in 1987, Juli Inkster in 1989, Alcott in 1991, Pat Hurst in 1998, Karrie Webb in 2000, and Patty Tavatanakit in 2021. The current champion is Nelly Korda.

== Champions ==
Key

*	Tournament won in a playoff
#	Tournament was won in 54-holes
†	Non-major competition
‡	Wire-to-wire victory (as a major)

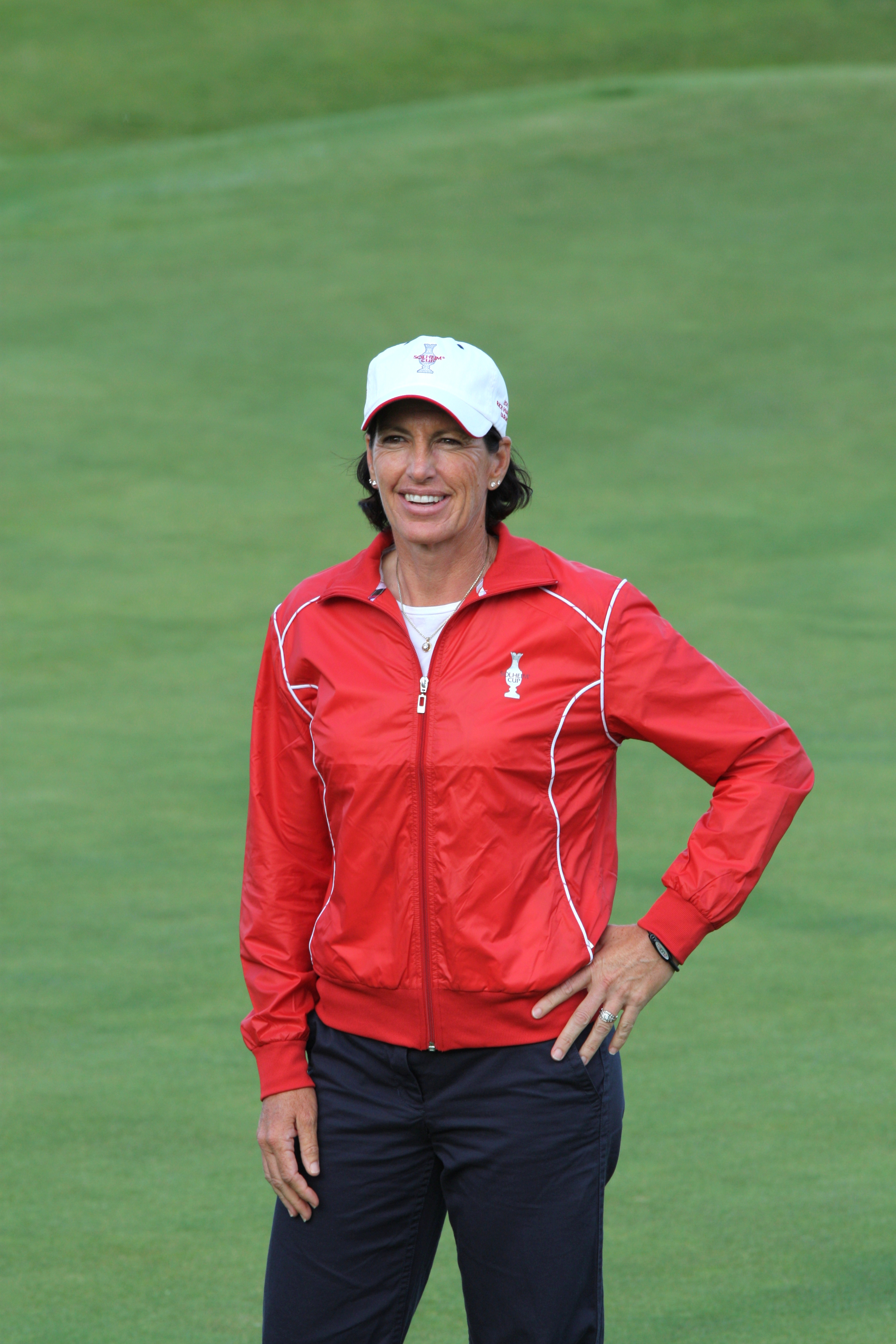
Juli Inkster is one of eight golfers to win two or more Chevron Championship titles; she won in 1984 and 1989. She is one of six champions to win wire-to-wire as a major with her victory in 1989.

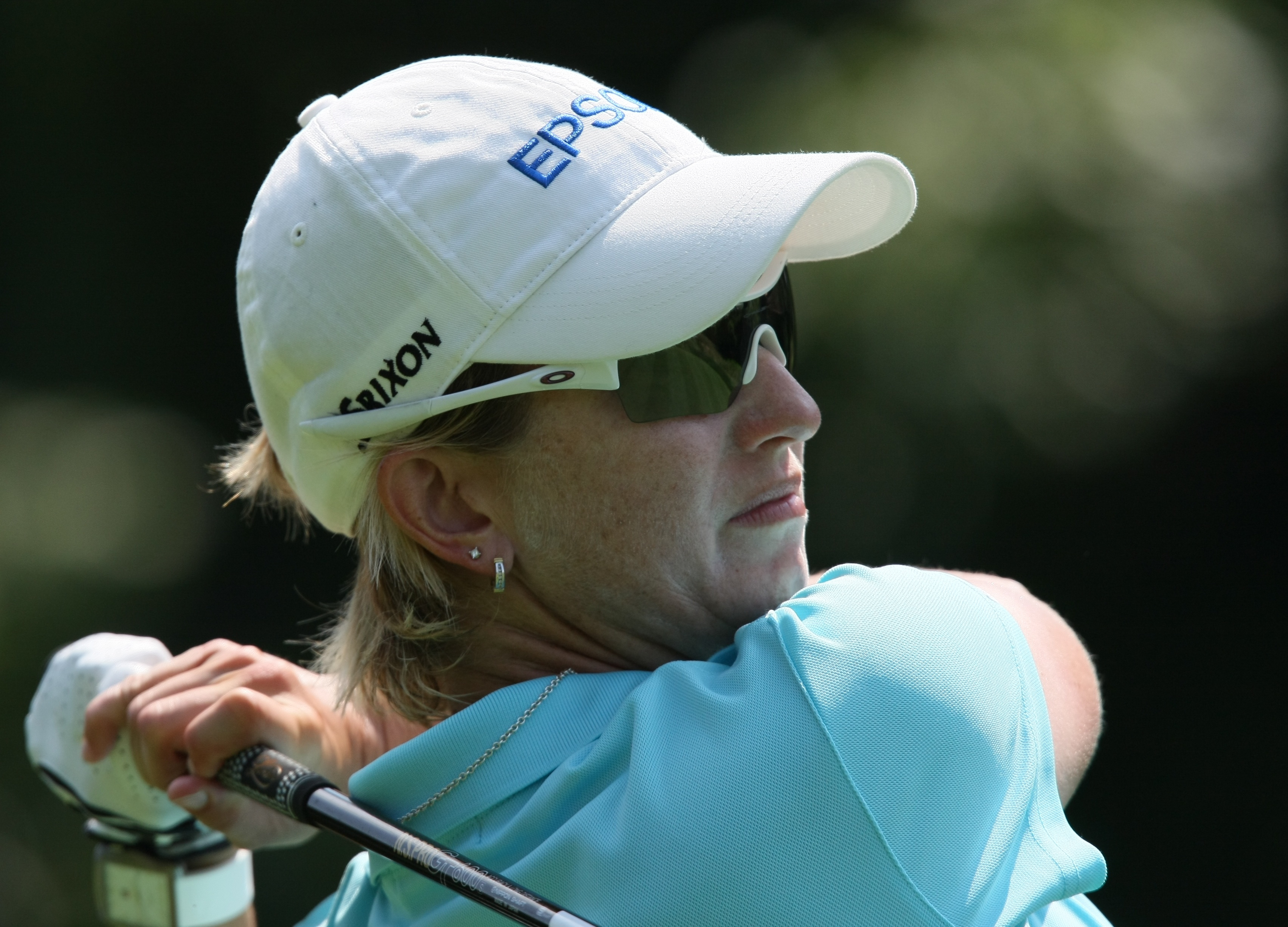
Karrie Webb is one of eight golfers to win two or more Chevron Championship titles; she won in 2000 and 2006. She is one of six champions to win wire-to-wire as a major with her victory in 2000.

Edition	Year	Country	Champion	Total score	To par^{[b]}	Notes
1st	1972†	United States	Jane Blalock	213#	−3	
2nd	1973†	United States	Mickey Wright	284	−4	
3rd	1974†	United States	Jo Ann Prentice*	289	+1	^{[c]}
4th	1975†	United States	Sandra Palmer	283	−5	
5th	1976†	United States	Judy Rankin	285	−3	
6th	1977†	United States	Kathy Whitworth	289	+1	
7th	1978†	Canada	Sandra Post*	283	−5	^{[d]}
8th	1979†	Canada	Sandra Post	276	−12	
9th	1980†	United States	Donna Caponi	275	−13	
10th	1981†	United States	Nancy Lopez	277	−11	
11th	1982†	South Africa	Sally Little	278	−10	
12th	1983	United States	Amy Alcott	282	−6	
13th	1984	United States	Juli Inkster*	280	−8	^{[e]}
14th	1985	United States	Alice Miller	275	−13	
15th	1986‡	United States	Pat Bradley	280	−8	
16th	1987‡	United States	Betsy King*	283	−5	^{[f]}
17th	1988	United States	Amy Alcott	274	−14	
18th	1989‡	United States	Juli Inkster	279	−9	
19th	1990	United States	Betsy King	283	−5	
20th	1991‡	United States	Amy Alcott	273	−15	
21st	1992	United States	Dottie Mochrie*	279	−9	^{[g]}
22nd	1993	Sweden	Helen Alfredsson	284	−4	
23rd	1994	United States	Donna Andrews	276	−12	
24th	1995	United States	Nanci Bowen	285	−3	
25th	1996	United States	Patty Sheehan	281	−7	
26th	1997	United States	Betsy King	276	−12	
27th	1998‡	United States	Pat Hurst	281	−7	
28th	1999	United States	Dottie Pepper	269	−19	
29th	2000‡	Australia	Karrie Webb	274	−14	
30th	2001	Sweden	Annika Sörenstam	281	−7	
31st	2002	Sweden	Annika Sörenstam	280	−8	
32nd	2003	France	Patricia Meunier-Lebouc	281	−7	
33rd	2004	South Korea	Grace Park	277	−11	
34th	2005	Sweden	Annika Sörenstam	273	−15	
35th	2006	Australia	Karrie Webb*	279	−9	^{[h]}
36th	2007	United States	Morgan Pressel	285	−3	
37th	2008	Mexico	Lorena Ochoa	277	−11	
38th	2009	United States	Brittany Lincicome	279	−9	
39th	2010	Taiwan	Yani Tseng	275	−13	
40th	2011	United States	Stacy Lewis	275	−13	
41st	2012	South Korea	Yoo Sun-young*	279	−9	^{[i]}
42nd	2013	South Korea	Inbee Park	273	−15	
43rd	2014	United States	Lexi Thompson	274	−14	
44th	2015	United States	Brittany Lincicome*	279	−9	^{[j]}
45th	2016	New Zealand	Lydia Ko	276	−12	
46th	2017	South Korea	Ryu So-yeon*	274	−14	^{[k]}
47th	2018	Sweden	Pernilla Lindberg*	273	−15	
48th	2019	South Korea	Ko Jin-young	278	−10	
49th	2020	South Korea	Mirim Lee*	273	−15	
50th	2021‡	Thailand	Patty Tavatanakit	270	−18	
51st	2022	United States	Jennifer Kupcho	274	−14	
52nd	2023	United States	Lilia Vu*	278	−10	
53rd	2024	United States	Nelly Korda	275	−13	
54th	2025	Japan	Mao Saigo*	281	−7	
55th	2026‡	United States	Nelly Korda	270	−18	

== Multiple champions ==
This table lists the golfers who have won more than one Chevron Championship title. Champions who won in consecutive years are indicated by the years with italics*.

Key

‡	Career Grand Slam winners
†	Won as a non-major event
T1	Tied for first place
T4	Tied for fourth place

Rank	Country	Golfer	Total	Years
T1	United States	Amy Alcott	3	1983, 1988, 1991
T1	United States	Betsy King	3	1987, 1990, 1997
T1	Sweden	Annika Sörenstam‡	3	2001*, 2002*, 2005
T4	Canada	Sandra Post†	2	1978*, 1979*
T4	United States	Juli Inkster‡	2	1984, 1989
T4	United States	Dottie Pepper	2	1992, 1999
T4	Australia	Karrie Webb‡	2	2000, 2006
T4	United States	Brittany Lincicome	2	2009, 2015
T4	United States	Nelly Korda	2	2024, 2026

== Champions by nationality ==
This table lists the total number of titles won by golfers of each nationality.

Key

T4	Tied for fourth place
T6	Tied for sixth place

Rank	Nationality	Non-major wins	Non-major winners	Major wins	Major winners	Total wins	Total winners	First title	Last title
1	United States	8	8	25	17	33	25	1972	2026
2	South Korea	0	0	6	6	6	6	2004	2020
3	Sweden	0	0	5	3	5	3	1993	2018
T4	Australia	0	0	2	1	2	1	2000	2006
T4	Canada	2	1	0	0	2	1	1978	1979
T6	France	0	0	1	1	1	1	2003	2003
T6	Japan	0	0	1	1	1	1	2025	2025
T6	Mexico	0	0	1	1	1	1	2008	2008
T6	New Zealand	0	0	1	1	1	1	2016	2016
T6	South Africa	1	1	0	0	1	1	1982	1982
T6	Taiwan	0	0	1	1	1	1	2010	2010
T6	Thailand	0	0	1	1	1	1	2021	2021

== See also ==
- Chronological list of LPGA major golf champions
- List of LPGA major championship winning golfers

== Notes ==
- ^{a} This tournament has had five name changes, which are the following: 1972–1981: Colgate Dinah Shore; 1982–1999: Nabisco Dinah Shore; 2000–2001: Nabisco Championship; 2002–2014: Kraft Nabisco Championship; 2015–2021: ANA Inspiration; 2022–present: Chevron Championship.
- ^{b} Par is a predetermined number of strokes that a golfer should require to complete a hole, a round (the sum of the total pars of the played holes), or a tournament (the sum of the total pars of each round). E stands for even, which means the tournament was completed in the predetermined number of strokes.
- ^{c} Jo Ann Prentice won in a sudden death playoff over Jane Blalock and Sandra Haynie.
- ^{d} Sandra Post won in a sudden death playoff over Penny Pulz.
- ^{e} Juli Inkster won in a sudden death playoff over Pat Bradley.
- ^{f} Betsy King won in a sudden death playoff over Patty Sheehan.
- ^{g} Dottie Mochrie won in a sudden death playoff over Juli Inkster.
- ^{h} Karrie Webb won in a sudden death playoff over Lorena Ochoa.
- ^{i} Yoo Sun-young won in a sudden death playoff over In-Kyung Kim.
- ^{j} Brittany Lincicome won in a sudden death playoff over Stacy Lewis.
- ^{k} Ryu So-yeon won in a sudden death playoff over Lexi Thompson.
