= 1991 Nabisco Dinah Shore =

Women's professional golf tournament held in Rancho Mirage, California

Coordinates: 33.798°N 116.433°W

Tournament information
- Dates: March 28–31, 1991
- Location: Rancho Mirage, California
- Courses: Mission Hills Country Club; Old Course (Dinah Shore Tourn. Course)
- Tour: LPGA Tour
- Format: Stroke play – 72 holes

Statistics
- Par: 72
- Length: 6,437 yards (5,886 m)
- Field: 121 players, 72 after cut
- Cut: 149 (+5)
- Prize fund: $600,000
- Winner's share: $90,000

Champion
- (United States) Amy Alcott
- 273 (−15)

Location in the United States
Location in California

The 1991 Nabisco Dinah Shore was a women's professional golf tournament, held March 28–31 at Mission Hills Country Club in Rancho Mirage, California. This was the 20th edition of the Nabisco Dinah Shore, and the ninth as a major championship.

At age 35, Amy Alcott broke her own scoring record to win her third Dinah Shore by eight strokes over runner-up Dottie Pepper, who won the following year. Alcott entered the final round with a seven-stroke lead; it was her fifth major title and 29th and final win on the LPGA Tour.

Alcott and caddy Bill Kurre had jumped into the water next to the 18th green after her previous victory in 1988, and she was not going to repeat it. Host Dinah Shore had written the foreword in Alcott's recent book, stating that she would join her in the jump if she won again, so Alcott, Kurre, and Shore took running leap together. The jump became a continuous tradition three years later when Donna Andrews won, followed by Nanci Bowen in 1995.

== Final leaderboard ==
Place	Player	Score	To par	Money ($)
1	(United States) Amy Alcott	67-70-68-68=273	−15	90,000
2	(United States) Dottie Pepper	70-71-71-69=281	−7	55,500
T3	(United States) Pat Bradley	70-72-73-67=282	−6	36,000
T3	(United States) Patty Sheehan	71-71-70-70=282	−6	36,000
5	(United States) Lori Garbacz	73-71-70-70=284	−4	25,500
T6	(United States) Caroline Keggi	72-70-73-70=285	−3	17,100
T6	(United States) Martha Nause	71-72-69-73=285	−3	17,100
T6	(Japan) Ayako Okamoto	72-68-74-71=285	−3	17,100
T6	(United States) Nancy Scranton	74-69-70-72=285	−3	17,100
10	(South Korea) Ku Ok-hee	69-72-73-72=286	−2	12,600
