= 1984 Nabisco Dinah Shore =

Women's professional golf tournament

Coordinates: 33.798°N 116.433°W

Tournament information
- Dates: April 5–8, 1984
- Location: Rancho Mirage, California
- Course: Mission Hills Country Club
- Tour: LPGA Tour
- Format: Stroke play - 72 holes

Statistics
- Par: 72
- Length: 6,265 yards (5,729 m)
- Prize fund: $400,000
- Winner's share: $55,000

Champion
- (United States) Juli Inkster
- 280 (−8), playoff

Location in the United States
Location in California

The 1984 Nabisco Dinah Shore was a women's professional golf tournament, held April 5–8 at Mission Hills Country Club in Rancho Mirage, California. This was the thirteenth edition of the ANA Inspiration, and the second as a major championship. With a purse of $400,000 and a winner's share of $55,000, this was the richest event in women's golf in 1984.

Juli Inkster, 23, won the first of her seven major titles in a sudden-death playoff over Pat Bradley, with a par on the first extra hole. It was Inkster's second win on tour; she turned professional eight months earlier and won the Safeco Classic near Seattle in September 1983.

Defending champion Amy Alcott finished at even par 288, eight strokes back in a tie for tenth.

== Final leaderboard ==
Sunday, April 8, 1984

Place	Player	Score	To par	Money ($)
T1	(United States) Juli Inkster	70-73-69-68=280	−8	Playoff
T1	(United States) Pat Bradley	75-66-69-70=280	−8	Playoff
3	(United States) Dale Eggeling	74-69-67-72=282	−6	23,833
4	(United States) Beth Daniel	74-75-65-69=283	−5	21,000
T5	(United States) JoAnne Carner	72-68-70-74=284	−4	15,440
T5	(United States) Sally Little	72-72-70-70=284	−4	15,440
7	(United States) Laurie Rinker	72-71-72-71=286	−2	11,112
T8	(United States) Jane Crafter	74-75-72-66=287	−1	8,788
T8	(United States) Patty Sheehan	69-72-75-71=287	−1	8,788
T10	(United States) Amy Alcott	71-72-74-71=288	E	6,552
T10	(United States) Judy Dickinson	70-73-73-72=288	E	6,552
T10	(United States) Jo Ann Washam	74-75-69-70=288	E	6,552
T10	(United States) Kathy Whitworth	69-75-70-74=288	E	6,552

=== Playoff ===
Place	Player	Score	To par	Money ($)
1	(United States) Juli Inkster	4	E	55,000
2	(United States) Pat Bradley	5	+1	33,000

The sudden-death playoff began and ended on the first extra hole, the par 4 fifteenth.
