= 1988 Nabisco Dinah Shore =

Coordinates: 33.798°N 116.433°W

Tournament information
- Dates: March 31 – April 3, 1988
- Location: Rancho Mirage, California
- Courses: Mission Hills Country Club (Dinah Shore Tourn. Course)
- Tour: LPGA Tour
- Format: Stroke play – 72 holes

Statistics
- Par: 72
- Length: 6,308 yards (5,768 m)
- Field: 110 players, 79 after cut
- Cut: 150 (+6)
- Prize fund: $500,000
- Winner's share: $80,000

Champion
- (United States) Amy Alcott
- 274 (−14)

Location in the United States
Location in California

The 1988 Nabisco Dinah Shore was a women's professional golf tournament, held March 31 to April 3 at Mission Hills Country Club in Rancho Mirage, California. This was the 17th edition of the Nabisco Dinah Shore, and the sixth as a major championship.

Amy Alcott won the second of her three Dinah Shores, two strokes ahead of runner-up Colleen Walker. With consecutive scores of 66 on Friday and Saturday, she entered the final round with a four-stroke lead.

Alcott and caddy Bill Kurre started the tradition of jumping into "Poppie's Pond" upon winning. After her third win 1991, they repeated the plunge, including tournament host Dinah Shore. It was not fully embraced by others until 1994, when Donna Andrews made the leap, followed by Nanci Bowen the next year, and it became an annual tradition.

== Final leaderboard ==
Sunday, April 3, 1988

Place	Player	Score	To par	Money ($)
1	(United States) Amy Alcott	71-66-66-71=274	−14	80,000
2	(United States) Colleen Walker	73-65-69-69=276	−12	42,000
3	(United States) Rosie Jones	73-67-68-71=279	−9	26,000
4	(United States) Caroline Keggi (a)	75-71-66-69=281	−7	0
T5	(Spain) Marta Figueras-Dotti	70-69-70-73=282	−6	18,000
T5	(United States) Nancy Lopez	74-69-70-69=282	−6	18,000
T7	(Canada) Dawn Coe	77-67-70-70=284	−4	14,430
T7	(United States) Jane Geddes	75-73-66-70=284	−4	14,430
T7	(United States) Dottie Pepper	76-71-70-67=284	−4	14,430
T10	(United States) Debbie Massey	72-68-73-72=285	−3	10,643
T10	(Australia) Jan Stephenson	69-72-70-74=285	−3	10,643

(a) - denotes amateur
