= World Matchplay =

World Matchplay may refer to:

In golf

- WGC Match Play, a World Golf Championships event
- Volvo World Match Play Championship, an invitational event on the European Tour
- Cisco World Ladies Match Play Championship, held in Japan in 2001 and 2002
- HSBC Women's World Match Play Championship, LPGA event held 2005–7

In other sports

- World Matchplay (darts)
- World Matchplay (snooker)
