= Silvia Bertolaccini =

Argentine professional golfer (born 1950)

Personal information
- Nationality: Argentina
- Born: 30 January 1950 (age 76) Rafaela, Argentina
- Height: 5 ft 8 in (1.73 m)

Career
- Sport: Golf
- Turned professional: 1975
- Former tour: LPGA Tour (1975–1990)
- Professional wins: 7

Number of wins by tour
- LPGA Tour: 4
- Other: 3

Best results in LPGA major championships
- Chevron Championship: T13: 1983
- Women's PGA C'ship: T7: 1977
- U.S. Women's Open: 7th: 1976
- du Maurier Classic: 3rd: 1979

Silvia Bertolaccini (born 30 January 1950) is an Argentine professional golfer who played on the LPGA Tour.

== Career ==
In 1950, Bertolaccini was born in Rafaela, Santa Fe.

She won the Argentine and Colombian amateur championships before turning professional and moving to the United States to play on the LPGA Tour in 1975. She won four times on the LPGA Tour between 1977 and 1984.

Bertolaccini has worked as a commentator for ESPN Deportes since 1996.

== Amateur wins ==
- 1972 Argentine National Amateur
- 1974 Colombian National Amateur

== Professional wins (7) ==
=== LPGA Tour wins (4) ===
No.	Date	Tournament	Winning score	Margin of victory	Runner(s)-up
1	13 Nov 1977	Colgate Far East Open	−2 (71-74-69=214)	1 stroke	(United States) Pat Bradley (United States) Donna Caponi (United States) Kathy Whitworth
2	15 Oct 1978	Civitan Open	−3 (72-73-68=213)	2 strokes	(United States) Kathy Whitworth
3	29 Oct 1979	Colgate Far East Open	−6 (69-72-72=213)	2 strokes	(Canada) Sandra Post
4	29 Jan 1984	Mazda Classic of Deer Creek	−8 (73-67-71-79=280)	3 strokes	(United States) Laurie Rinker

=== Other wins (3) ===
- 1975 Kansas City Open (USA)
- 1977 Singapore Open
- 1979 Philippine Open
