= 2021 ANA Inspiration =

Tournament information
- Dates: April 1–4, 2021
- Location: Rancho Mirage, California; 33.798°N 116.433°W
- Courses: Mission Hills Country Club; Dinah Shore Tournament Course
- Tour: LPGA Tour
- Format: Stroke play - 72 holes

Statistics
- Par: 72
- Length: 6,763 yards (6,184 m)
- Field: 119 players, 71 after cut
- Cut: 145 (+1)
- Prize fund: $3.1 million
- Winner's share: 465,000

Champion
- (Thailand) Patty Tavatanakit
- 270 (−18)
- Location in the United States Location in California

The 2021 ANA Inspiration was the 50th ANA Inspiration golf tournament, held April 1–4, 2021 at the Dinah Shore Tournament Course of Mission Hills Country Club in Rancho Mirage, California. It was its 39th year as a major championship on the LPGA Tour, and Golf Channel televised the event for the 11th consecutive year. The tournament was originally known as the Colgate-Dinah Shore Winner's Circle.

Patty Tavatanakit won her first LPGA Tour event by two strokes over Lydia Ko. Tavatanakit won the event wire-to-wire and became the first rookie to win the ANA Inspiration since Juli Inkster in 1984 and the fourth straight first-time major winner.

== Field ==
Players who have qualified for the event are listed below. Players are listed under the first category in which they qualified; additional qualifying categories are shown in parentheses.

1. Active LPGA Tour Hall of Fame members (must have participated in ten official LPGA Tour tournaments within the 12 months prior to the commitment deadline)

2. Winners of all previous ANA Inspirations

3. Winners of the U.S. Women's Open, Women's PGA Championship, and Ricoh Women's British Open in the previous five years

4. Winners of The Evian Championship in the previous five years

5. Winners of official LPGA Tour tournaments from the 2016 ANA Inspiration through the week immediately preceding the 2021 ANA Inspiration

6. All players who finished in the top-20 in the previous year's ANA Inspiration

7. All players who finished in the top-5 of the previous year's U.S. Women's Open, Women's PGA Championship, Ricoh Women's British Open and The Evian Championship

8. Top-80 on the previous year's season-ending LPGA Tour official money list

9. Top-30 on the Women's World Golf Rankings as of a March 8, 2021

10. Top-2 players from the previous year's season-ending Ladies European Tour Order of Merit, LPGA of Japan Tour money list and LPGA of Korea Tour money list

11. Top-20 players plus ties on the current year LPGA Tour official money list at the end of the last official tournament prior to the current ANA Inspiration, not otherwise qualified above, provided such players are within the top-80 positions on the current year LPGA Tour official money list at the beginning of the tournament competition

12. Previous year's Louise Suggs Rolex Rookie of the Year

13. Previous year's U.S. Women's Amateur champion, provided she is still an amateur at the beginning of tournament competition

14. Any LPGA Member who did not compete in the previous year's ANA Inspiration major due to injury, illness or maternity, who subsequently received a medical/maternity extension of membership from the LPGA in the previous calendar year, provided they were otherwise qualified to compete in the previous year's ANA Inspiration

15. Up to six sponsor invitations for top-ranked amateur players

== Round summaries ==
=== First round ===
Thursday, April 1, 2021

Place	Player	Score	To par
1	(Thailand) Patty Tavatanakit	66	−6
T2	(China) Shanshan Feng	67	−5
T2	(Republic of Ireland) Leona Maguire	67	−5
T4	(Thailand) Ariya Jutanugarn	68	−4
T4	(Thailand) Moriya Jutanugarn	68	−4
T4	(United States) Megan Khang	68	−4
T4	(Sweden) Anna Nordqvist	68	−4
T8	(England) Georgia Hall	69	−3
T8	(England) Charley Hull	69	−3
T8	(South Korea) Ko Jin-young	69	−3
T8	(United States) Jessica Korda	69	−3
T8	(United States) Jennifer Kupcho	69	−3
T8	(England) Bronte Law	69	−3
T8	(South Korea) Mirim Lee	69	−3
T8	(Philippines) Yuka Saso	69	−3

=== Second round ===
Friday, April 2, 2021

Place	Player	Score	To par
1	(Thailand) Patty Tavatanakit	66-69=135	−9
2	(China) Shanshan Feng	67-69=136	−8
3	(Thailand) Moriya Jutanugarn	68-69=137	−7
T4	(England) Charley Hull	69-69=138	−6
T4	(Sweden) Anna Nordqvist	68-70=138	−6
T6	(England) Georgia Hall	69-70=139	−5
T6	(South Korea) Ko Jin-young	69-70=139	−5
T6	(New Zealand) Lydia Ko	70-69=139	−5
T6	(South Korea) Mirim Lee	69-70=139	−5
T6	(South Korea) Inbee Park	70-69=139	−5
T6	(Germany) Sophia Popov	70-69=139	−5

=== Third round ===
Saturday, April 3, 2021

Place	Player	Score	To par
1	(Thailand) Patty Tavatanakit	66-69-67=202	−14
T2	(United States) Ally Ewing	71-70-66=207	−9
T2	(South Korea) Mirim Lee	69-70-68=207	−9
4	(China) Shanshan Feng	67-69-72=208	−8
T5	(England) Charley Hull	69-69-71=209	−7
T5	(South Korea) Inbee Park	70-69-70=209	−7
T7	(Thailand) Moriya Jutanugarn	68-69-73=210	−6
T7	(South Korea) Ko Jin-young	69-70-71=210	−6
T7	(New Zealand) Lydia Ko	70-69-71=210	−6
T7	(Mexico) Gaby López	73-67-70=210	−6

=== Final round ===
Sunday, April 4, 2021

Place	Player	Score	To par	Prize money (US$)
1	(Thailand) Patty Tavatanakit	66-69-67-68=270	−18	465,000
2	(New Zealand) Lydia Ko	70-69-71-62=272	−16	287,716
T3	(China) Shanshan Feng	67-69-72-69=277	−11	151,615
T3	(South Korea) Kim Sei-young	72-71-68-66=277	−11	151,615
T3	(United States) Nelly Korda	71-70-70-66=277	−11	151,615
T3	(Denmark) Nanna Koerstz Madsen	72-68-71-66=277	−11	151,615
T7	(United States) Ally Ewing	71-70-66-71=278	−10	79,025
T7	(South Korea) Ko Jin-young	69-70-71-68=278	−10	79,025
T7	(South Korea) Inbee Park	70-69-70-69=278	−10	79,025
T10	(Thailand) Moriya Jutanugarn	68-69-73-69=279	−9	59,333
T10	(United States) Megan Khang	68-73-71-67=279	−9	59,333
T10	(South Korea) Mirim Lee	69-70-68-72=279	−9	59,333

==== Scorecard ====
Final round

Hole	1	2	3	4	5	6	7	8	9	10	11	12	13	14	15	16	17	18
Par	4	5	4	4	3	4	4	3	5	4	5	4	4	3	4	4	3	5
(Thailand) Tavatanakit	−14	−16	−16	−16	−16	−16	−16	−17	−17	−17	−17	−18	−18	−18	−18	−18	−18	−18
(New Zealand) Ko	−7	−9	−9	−10	−10	−11	−12	−12	−13	−14	−15	−15	−15	−15	−16	−16	−16	−16
(China) Feng	−8	−8	−8	−8	−8	−8	−8	−8	−8	−8	−9	−9	−10	−10	−10	−11	−11	−11
(South Korea) Kim	−6	−7	−7	−8	−8	−9	−9	−10	−10	−10	−10	−11	−11	−11	−11	−10	−10	−11
(United States) Korda	−5	−6	−6	−6	−6	−6	−6	−6	−8	−8	−9	−9	−9	−9	−10	−10	−10	−11
(Denmark) Madsen	−5	−6	−6	−6	−6	−5	−6	−6	−6	−5	−7	−8	−9	−9	−10	−11	−11	−11

Cumulative tournament scores, relative to par

Eagle	Birdie	Bogey
