= 2022 Chevron Championship =

Tournament information
- Dates: March 31 – April 3, 2022
- Location: Rancho Mirage, California; 33.798°N 116.433°W
- Courses: Mission Hills Country Club; Dinah Shore Tournament Course
- Tour: LPGA Tour
- Format: Stroke play – 72 holes

Statistics
- Par: 72
- Length: 6,763 yards (6,184 m)
- Field: 115 players, 75 after cut
- Cut: 145 (+1)
- Prize fund: US$5,000,000
- Winner's share: US$750,000

Champion
- (United States) Jennifer Kupcho
- 274 (−14)
- Location in the United States Location in California

The 2022 Chevron Championship was the 51st Chevron Championship LPGA golf tournament, held March 31 through April 3 at the Dinah Shore Tournament Course of Mission Hills Country Club in Rancho Mirage, California. The tournament was in its first year with Chevron Corporation as the title sponsor and its 40th as a major championship. The Golf Channel televised the event for the 12th consecutive year.

Jennifer Kupcho won her first LPGA tournament with a total of 274 (–14), two strokes ahead of runner-up Jessica Korda. This was the final playing of the tournament at Mission Hills; the tournament moved to Texas in 2023 as part of a new title sponsorship agreement.

== Field ==
Players who have qualified for the event are listed below. Players are listed under the first category in which they qualified; additional qualifying categories are shown in parentheses.

1. Active LPGA Tour Hall of Fame members (must have participated in ten official LPGA Tour tournaments within the 12 months prior to the commitment deadline)

- Inbee Park (2,3,4,5,7,8)

2. Winners of all previous Chevron Championship

- Ko Jin-young (3,4,5,7,8)
- Lydia Ko (4,5,7,8)
- Mirim Lee (4,5)
- Stacy Lewis (4,7)
- Brittany Lincicome (7)
- Pernilla Lindberg (5)
- Ryu So-yeon (7,8)
- Patty Tavatanakit (4,5,6,7,8,11)
- Lexi Thompson (4,6,7,8,10)
- Yani Tseng, Karrie Webb did not play

3. Winners of the U.S. Women's Open, Women's PGA Championship, Women's British Open, and The Evian Championship in the previous five years

- Hannah Green (4,5,7,8)
- Georgia Hall (4,6,7,8,10)
- Ariya Jutanugarn (4,7,8)
- Danielle Kang (4,5,6,7,8,10)
- Kim A-lim (7)
- In-Kyung Kim
- Kim Sei-young (4,5,7,8)
- Lee Jeong-eun (6,7,8)
- Minjee Lee (4,6,7,8)
- Anna Nordqvist (6,7,8,10)
- Park Sung-hyun (4)
- Sophia Popov (7,10)
- Yuka Saso (6,7,8)
- Hinako Shibuno
- Angela Stanford (4,7)
- Nelly Korda (4,5,6,7,8,10) did not play

4. Winners of official LPGA Tour tournaments from the 2019 ANA Inspiration through the week immediately preceding the 2022 Chevron Championship

- Pajaree Anannarukarn (7)
- Céline Boutier (7,8,10)
- Matilda Castren (7,10)
- Austin Ernst (7,10)
- Ally Ewing (5,7,8,10)
- Nasa Hataoka (6,7,8)
- Brooke Henderson (5,7,8)
- Hsu Wei-ling (7)
- Moriya Jutanugarn (5,7)
- Kim Hyo-joo (6,7,8)
- Cheyenne Knight
- Jessica Korda (7,8,10)
- Bronte Law
- Gaby López (7)
- Nanna Koerstz Madsen (5,6,7,10)
- Leona Maguire (7,8,10)
- Ryann O'Toole (5,7)
- Park Hee-young
- Mel Reid (5,7)
- Madelene Sagström (6,7)
- Atthaya Thitikul (6,8,9-LET)
- Ai Suzuki, M. J. Hur, Jang Ha-na (8) did not play

5. All players who finished in the top-20 in the previous year's Chevron Championship

- Charley Hull (7,10)
- Megan Khang (6,7,10)
- Christina Kim
- Lee Mi-hyang
- Yu Liu (7)
- Stephanie Meadow
- Gabriela Ruffels

6. All players who finished in the top-5 of the previous year's U.S. Women's Open, Women's PGA Championship, Women's British Open and The Evian Championship

- Ayaka Furue (8,9-JLPGA)
- Giulia Molinaro (7)
- Yealimi Noh (7,10)
- Lizette Salas (7,8,10)
- Shanshan Feng (7) did not play

7. Top-80 on the previous year's season-ending LPGA Tour Race to the CME Globe points list

- Marina Alex
- Brittany Altomare (10)
- Aditi Ashok
- Ashleigh Buhai
- Chella Choi
- Chun In-gee (8)
- Carlota Ciganda (10)
- Cydney Clanton
- Jenny Coleman
- Perrine Delacour
- Jaye Marie Green
- Mina Harigae (10)
- Esther Henseleit
- Ji Eun-hee
- Sarah Kemp
- Jennifer Kupcho (10)
- Alison Lee
- Lee Jeong-eun
- Min Lee
- Lin Xiyu
- Caroline Masson
- Wichanee Meechai
- Su-Hyun Oh
- Amy Olson
- Sarah Schmelzel
- Jenny Shin
- Jennifer Song
- Lauren Stephenson
- Thidapa Suwannapura
- Emma Talley
- Albane Valenzuela
- Lindsey Weaver-Wright
- Amy Yang
- Angel Yin
- Elizabeth Szokol did not play

8. Top-30 on the Women's World Golf Rankings as of a March 7, 2022

- Mone Inami (9-JLPGA), Park Min-ji (9-KLPGA) did not play

9. Top-2 players from the previous year's season-ending Ladies European Tour Order of Merit, LPGA of Japan Tour Order of Merit and LPGA of Korea Tour money list

- Pia Babnik
- Lim Hee-jeong

10. Members of the European and United States Solheim Cup teams in 2021

- Emily Kristine Pedersen

11. Top-15 players plus ties on the current year LPGA Tour Race to the CME Globe points list at the end of the last official tournament prior to the current Chevron Championship, not otherwise qualified above, provided such players are within the top-80 positions on the list at the beginning of the tournament competition

- An Na-rin
- Choi Hye-jin
- Allison Emrey
- Jodi Ewart Shadoff
- Yaeeun Hong
- Janie Jackson
- Maude-Aimee Leblanc
- Annie Park
- Pornanong Phatlum
- Paula Reto
- Pauline Roussin-Bouchard
- Kelly Tan
- Alana Uriell
- Lilia Vu

12. Previous year's Louise Suggs Rolex Rookie of the Year

13. Previous year's U.S. Women's Amateur champion, provided she is still an amateur at the beginning of tournament competition

14. Any LPGA Member who did not compete in the previous year's Chevron Championship major due to injury, illness or maternity, who subsequently received a medical/maternity extension of membership from the LPGA in the previous calendar year, provided they were otherwise qualified to compete in the previous year's Chevron Championship

- Charlotte Thomas
- Sakura Yokomine

15. Up to six sponsor invitations for top-ranked amateur players

- Isabella Fierro (a)
- Gurleen Kaur (a)
- Natasha Andrea Oon (a)
- Bohyun Park (a)
- Brooke Seay (a)

== Round summaries ==
=== First round ===
Thursday, March 31, 2022

Jennifer Kupcho and Minjee Lee shared the lead with opening rounds of 66, 6-under-par. Defending champion Patty Tavatanakit was a stroke behind in third place, with a group of six players a further shot behind on 68.

Place	Player	Score	To par
T1	(United States) Jennifer Kupcho	66	−6
T1	(Australia) Minjee Lee	66	−6
3	(Thailand) Patty Tavatanakit	67	−5
T4	(Thailand) Pajaree Anannarukarn	68	−4
T4	(England) Georgia Hall	68	−4
T4	(New Zealand) Lydia Ko	68	−4
T4	(Germany) Caroline Masson	68	−4
T4	(Sweden) Anna Nordqvist	68	−4
T4	(Australia) Gabriela Ruffels	68	−4
T10	(United States) Annie Park	69	−3
T10	(France) Pauline Roussin-Bouchard	69	−3
T10	(United States) Sarah Schmelzel	69	−3
T10	(Japan) Hinako Shibuno	69	−3
T10	(United States) Lauren Stephenson	69	−3
T10	(United States) Lexi Thompson	69	−3

=== Second round ===
Friday, April 1, 2022

Hinako Shibuno scored a second-round 66 to lead after 36 holes on 135, 9-under-par. Jennifer Kupcho, Annie Park and Patty Tavatanakit were a stroke behind, tied for second place.

Place	Player	Score	To par
1	(Japan) Hinako Shibuno	69-66=135	−9
T2	(United States) Jennifer Kupcho	66-70=136	−8
T2	(United States) Annie Park	69-67=136	−8
T2	(Thailand) Patty Tavatanakit	67-69=136	−8
T5	(South Korea) Kim Hyo-joo	70-67=137	−7
T5	(South Korea) Kim Sei-young	70-67=137	−7
T7	(United States) Ally Ewing	70-68=138	−6
T7	(Denmark) Nanna Koerstz Madsen	71-67=138	−6
T9	(Thailand) Pajaree Anannarukarn	68-71=139	−5
T9	(France) Céline Boutier	70-69=139	−5
T9	(England) Georgia Hall	68-71=139	−5
T9	(Australia) Minjee Lee	66-73=139	−5
T9	(Germany) Caroline Masson	68-71=139	−5
T9	(Australia) Gabriela Ruffels	68-71=139	−5
T9	(United States) Lexi Thompson	69-70=139	−5

=== Third round ===
Saturday, April 2, 2022

Jennifer Kupcho set a 54-hole record in the tournament in having a 16-under-par total (200) with her eight-under-par 64. She beat the previous total by two strokes. She led by six strokes over defending champion Patty Tavatanakit at 206.

Place	Player	Score	To par
1	(United States) Jennifer Kupcho	66-70-64=200	−16
2	(Thailand) Patty Tavatanakit	67-69-70=206	−10
3	(United States) Jessica Korda	71-69-67=207	−9
4	(United States) Annie Park	69-67-73=209	−7
T5	(Australia) Hannah Green	70-72-68=210	−6
T5	(Canada) Brooke Henderson	72-71-67=210	−6
T5	(South Korea) Kim Hyo-joo	70-67-73=210	−6
T5	(Denmark) Nanna Koerstz Madsen	71-67-72=210	−6
T5	(Australia) Gabriela Ruffels	68-71-71=210	−6
T5	(United States) Lexi Thompson	69-70-71=210	−6

=== Final round ===
Sunday, April 3, 2022

Jennifer Kupcho won the tournament with a 14-under-par total of 274, for her first LPGA Tour win. Her final round of 74 included bogeys at the last two holes. Jessica Korda finished second after a final round of 69, while Pia Babnik rose to third place after a 6-under-par 66.

Place	Player	Score	To par	Prize money ($)
1	(United States) Jennifer Kupcho	66-70-64-74=274	−14	750,000
2	(United States) Jessica Korda	71-69-67-69=276	−12	461,757
3	(Slovenia) Pia Babnik	70-70-71-66=277	−11	334,972
T4	(France) Céline Boutier	70-69-72-67=278	−10	195,295
T4	(Japan) Hinako Shibuno	69-66-77-66=278	−10	195,295
T4	(Thailand) Patty Tavatanakit	67-69-70-72=278	−10	195,295
T4	(United States) Lexi Thompson	69-70-71-68=278	−10	195,295
T8	(Australia) Hannah Green	70-72-68-70=280	−8	108,708
T8	(South Korea) Kim Hyo-joo	70-67-73-70=280	−8	108,708
T8	(United States) Alison Lee	71-70-72-67=280	−8	108,708
T8	(Denmark) Nanna Koerstz Madsen	71-67-72-70=280	−8	108,708
