= Lauren Howe (golfer) =

American professional golfer (born 1959)

Personal information
- Nationality: United States
- Born: April 30, 1959 (age 67) Provo, Utah, U.S.
- Height: 5 ft 7 in (1.70 m)

Career
- Sport: Golf
- College: University of Tulsa
- Status: Professional
- Former tour: LPGA Tour (1978–1990)
- Professional wins: 1

Number of wins by tour
- LPGA Tour: 1

Best results in LPGA major championships
- Chevron Championship: T28: 1987
- Women's PGA C'ship: T16: 1983
- U.S. Women's Open: T14: 1986
- du Maurier Classic: T22: 1985

Lauren Howe (born April 30, 1959) is an American professional golfer who played on the LPGA Tour.

== Career ==
Howe won once on the LPGA Tour in 1983.

== Amateur wins ==
this list may be incomplete

- 1977 Women's Western Amateur

== Professional wins ==
=== LPGA Tour wins (1) ===
No.	Date	Tournament	Winning score	Margin of victory	Runner-up
1	Jul 24, 1983	Mayflower Classic	−8 (67-67-76-70=280)	1 stroke	(United States) Donna Caponi

LPGA Tour playoff record (0–1)

No.	Year	Tournament	Opponent	Result
1	1986	Mazda Hall of Fame Championship	(United States) Amy Alcott	Lost to birdie on first extra hole
