= Lauren Howe =

Lauren Howe may refer to:

- Lauren Howe (golfer)
- Lauren Howe (model)
