= Lynn Adams =

Lynn(e) Adams may refer to:

- Lynn Adams (racquetball) (born 1958), American racquetball player
- Lynn Adams (golfer) (born 1950), American golfer
- Lynne Adams (born 1946), American actress

== See also ==
- Linda Adams (disambiguation)
