= 1983 Nabisco Dinah Shore =

Coordinates: 33.798°N 116.433°W

Tournament information
- Dates: March 31 – April 3, 1983
- Location: Rancho Mirage, California
- Course: Mission Hills Country Club
- Tour: LPGA Tour
- Format: Stroke play - 72 holes

Statistics
- Par: 72
- Length: 6,265 yards (5,729 m)
- Cut: 155 (+11)
- Prize fund: $400,000
- Winner's share: $55,000

Champion
- (United States) Amy Alcott
- 282 (−6)

Location in the United States
Location in California

The 1983 Nabisco Dinah Shore was a women's professional golf tournament, held March 31 to April 3 at Mission Hills Country Club in Rancho Mirage, California. It was the twelfth edition of what is now the Chevron Championship and its first year as a major championship.

In strong winds, Amy Alcott won the third of her five major titles, two strokes ahead of runners-up Kathy Whitworth and Beth Daniel, the leader after each of the first three rounds. Alcott won the title again in 1988 and 1991.

It was the richest tournament in women's golf in 1983; the $400,000 purse was double that of the 1983 U.S. Women's Open. The final round attendance in 1983 was over 20,000, and this was the first year that amateurs were invited; two made the cut and future major winner Kathy Baker was the low amateur.

The previous year's champion, Sally Little, finished at 303 (+15), 21 strokes back in a tie for 44th place.

== Final leaderboard ==
Sunday, April 3, 1983

Place	Player	Score	To par	Money ($)
1	(United States) Amy Alcott	70-70-70-72=282	−6	55,000
T2	(United States) Beth Daniel	69-69-70-76=284	−4	30,845
T2	(United States) Kathy Whitworth	73-70-69-72=284	−4	30,845
T4	(United States) JoAnne Carner	73-72-77-69=291	+3	16,515
T4	(United States) Janet Coles	73-70-72-76=291	+3	16,515
T6	(United States) Judy Clark	73-75-69-75=292	+4	12,295
T6	(United States) Nancy Lopez	74-71-71-76=292	+4	12,295
8	(United States) Vicki Fergon	73-75-70-75=293	+5	10,643
T9	(Switzerland) Carole Charbonnier	77-70-75-72=294	+6	8,808
T9	(United States) Barbara Moxness	73-68-78-75=294	+6	8,808
T9	(United States) Alice Ritzman	73-76-75-70=294	+6	8,808
T9	(United States) Jo Ann Washam	72-73-73-76=294	+6	8,808

Amateurs: Kathy Baker (+14), Debbie Weldon (+25).
