= 1983 LPGA Tour =

Golf tour season

1983 LPGA Tour season
- Duration: January 27, 1983 – November 13, 1983
- Number of official events: 33
- Most wins: 4 (United States) Pat Bradley, (United States) Patty Sheehan
- Money leader: (United States) JoAnne Carner
- Player of the Year: (United States) Patty Sheehan
- Vare Trophy: (United States) JoAnne Carner
- Rookie of the Year: (United States) Stephanie Farwig

The 1983 LPGA Tour was the 34th season since the LPGA Tour officially began in 1950. The season ran from January 27 to November 13, 1983. The season consisted of 33 official money events. Pat Bradley and Patty Sheehan won the most tournaments, with four each. JoAnne Carner led the money list with earnings of $291,404.

There were nine first-time winners in 1983: Lynn Adams, Lauren Howe, Juli Inkster, Alice Miller, Lenore Muraoka, Anne Marie Palli, Lauri Peterson, Kathy Postlewait, and Patti Rizzo. This was the first year that the Nabisco Dinah Shore (now called the Chevron Championship) was classified as an LPGA major.

The tournament results and award winners are listed below.

== Tournament results ==
The following table shows all the official money events for the 1983 season. "Date" is the ending date of the tournament. The numbers in parentheses after the winners' names are the number of wins they had on the tour up to and including that event. Majors are shown in bold.

Date	Tournament	Location	Winner	Score	Purse ($)	1st prize ($)
Jan 30	Mazda Classic of Deer Creek	Florida	(United States) Pat Bradley (10)	272 (−16)	150,000	22,500
Feb 6	Elizabeth Arden Classic	Florida	(United States) Nancy Lopez (26)	285 (−3)	150,000	22,500
Feb 13	Sarasota Classic	Florida	(United States) Donna White (3)	284 (−4)	175,000	26,250
Feb 27	Tucson Conquistadores LPGA Open	Arizona	(Australia) Jan Stephenson (10)	207 (−9)	150,000	22,500
Mar 6	Samaritan Turquoise Classic	Arizona	(France) Anne Marie Palli (1)	205 (−14)	150,000	22,500
Mar 20	Women's Kemper Open	Hawaii	(United States) Kathy Whitworth (84)	288 (−4)	200,000	30,000
Apr 3	**Nabisco Dinah Shore**	California	(United States) **Amy Alcott (17)**	282 (−6)	400,000	55,000
Apr 10	J&B Scotch Pro-Am	Nevada	(United States) Nancy Lopez (27)	283 (−6)	200,000	30,000
Apr 17	Combanks Orlando Classic	Florida	(United States) Lynn Adams (1)	208 (−8)	150,000	22,500
Apr 24	S&H Golf Classic	Florida	(United States) Hollis Stacy (13)	277 (−11)	150,000	22,500
May 1	CPC International	South Carolina	(United States) Hollis Stacy (14)	285 (−3)	175,000	26,250
May 8	Lady Michelob	Georgia	(United States) Janet Coles (2)	206 (−10)	150,000	22,500
May 15	United Virginia Bank Classic	Virginia	(United States) Lenore Muraoka (1)	212 (−4)	150,000	22,500
May 22	Chrysler-Plymouth Charity Classic	New Jersey	(United States) Pat Bradley (11)	212 (−7)	125,000	18,750
May 29	Corning Classic	New York	(United States) Patty Sheehan (5)	272 (−16)	150,000	22,500
Jun 5	West Virginia LPGA Classic	West Virginia	(United States) Alice Miller (1)	216 (E)	150,000	22,500
Jun 12	**LPGA Championship**	Ohio	(United States) **Patty Sheehan (6)**	279 (−9)	200,000	30,000
Jun 19	Lady Keystone Open	Pennsylvania	(Australia) Jan Stephenson (11)	205 (−11)	200,000	30,000
Jun 26	Rochester International	New York	(Japan) Ayako Okamoto (2)	282 (−6)	200,000	30,000
Jul 3	**Peter Jackson Classic**	Canada	(United States) **Hollis Stacy (15)**	277 (−11)	250,000	37,500
Jul 17	McDonald's Kids Classic	Pennsylvania	(United States) Beth Daniel (13)	286 (−2)	350,000	52,500
Jul 24	Mayflower Classic	Indiana	(United States) Lauren Howe (1)	280 (−8)	200,000	30,000
Jul 31	**U.S. Women's Open**	Oklahoma	(Australia) **Jan Stephenson (12)**	290 (+6)	200,000	32,780
Aug 7	Boston Five Classic	Massachusetts	(United States) Patti Rizzo (1)	277 (−11)	175,000	26,250
Aug 14	Henredon Classic	North Carolina	(United States) Patty Sheehan (7)	272 (−16)	180,000	27,000
Aug 21	Chevrolet World Championship of Women's Golf	Ohio	(United States) JoAnne Carner (39)	282 (−6)	200,000	65,000
Aug 28	Columbia Savings Classic	Colorado	(United States) Pat Bradley (12)	277 (−11)	200,000	30,000
Sep 5	Rail Charity Classic	Illinois	(United States) Lauri Peterson (1)	210 (−6)	150,000	22,500
Sep 11	Portland Ping Championship	Oregon	(United States) JoAnne Carner (40)	212 (−4)	150,000	22,500
Sep 18	Safeco Classic	Washington	(United States) Juli Inkster (1)	283 (−6)	175,000	26,250
Sep 26	Inamori Classic	California	(United States) Patty Sheehan (8)	209 (−10)	175,000	26,250
Oct 2	San Jose Classic	California	(United States) Kathy Postlewait (1)	213 (−5)	175,000	26,250
Nov 13	Mazda Japan Classic	Japan	(United States) Pat Bradley (13)	206 (−10)	300,000	37,500

== Awards ==
Award	Winner	Country
Money winner	JoAnne Carner (3)	United States
Scoring leader (Vare Trophy)	JoAnne Carner (5)	United States
Player of the Year	Patty Sheehan	United States
Rookie of the Year	Stephanie Farwig	United States
