= Colgate Far East Open =

LGPA Tour golf tournament

The Colgate Far East Open was a golf tournament on the LPGA Tour from 1974 to 1979. It was an unofficial event in 1974 and 1975.

== Tournament locations ==
Years	Venue	Location
1974, 1975	Victoria Golf Club	Melbourne, Australia
1976, 1979	Manila Golf & Country Club	Manila, Philippines
1977	Singapore Island Country Club	Singapore
1978	Royal Selangor Golf Club	Kuala Lumpur, Malaysia

== Winners ==
Colgate Far East Open

- 1979 Silvia Bertolaccini
- 1978 Nancy Lopez
- 1977 Silvia Bertolaccini

Colgate Far East Championship

- 1976 Amy Alcott

As unofficial event

Colgate Far East Ladies Tournament

- 1975 Pat Bradley

Colgate Far East Open

- 1974 Sandra Post
