= 1980 U.S. Women's Open =

Coordinates: 36.050°N 86.822°W

Tournament information
- Dates: July 10–13, 1980
- Location: Nashville, Tennessee
- Course: Richland Country Club
- Organized by: USGA
- Tour: LPGA Tour

Statistics
- Par: 71
- Length: 6,229 yards (5,696 m)
- Field: 150 players, 60 after cut
- Cut: 153 (+9)
- Prize fund: $140,000
- Winner's share: $20,047

Champion
- (United States) Amy Alcott
- 280 (−4)

Location in the United States
Location in Tennessee

The 1980 U.S. Women's Open was the 35th U.S. Women's Open, held July 10–13 at Richland Country Club in Nashville, Tennessee.

Amy Alcott won her only U.S. Women's Open, nine shots ahead of runner-up Hollis Stacy. She entered the final round with an eight-stroke lead; it was the second of her five major titles.

The field of 150 players included 49 amateurs, of which two made the 36-hole cut.

On the weekend, temperatures reached 100 °F (38 °C).

== Final leaderboard ==
Sunday, July 13, 1980

Place	Player	Score	To par	Money ($)
1	(United States) Amy Alcott	70-70-68-72=280	−4	20,047
2	(United States) Hollis Stacy	75-71-70-73=289	+5	11,347
3	(United States) Kathy McMullen	74-73-71-73=291	+7	8,547
T4	(United States) Donna Caponi Young	72-72-75-73=292	+8	6,347
T4	(United States) Judy Dickinson	75-73-73-71=292	+8	6,347
6	(United States) Louise Bruce-Parks	73-74-73-73=293	+9	4,847
T7	(United States) Jane Blalock	76-71-71-76=294	+10	3,964
T7	(United States) Lori Garbacz	72-76-75-71=294	+10	3,964
T7	(United States) Nancy Lopez-Melton	74-72-71-77=294	+10	3,964
T10	(United States) Beth Daniel	76-72-69-78=295	+11	3,085
T10	(Taiwan) Eva Chang	74-74-72-75=295	+11	3,085
T10	(United States) JoAnne Carner	74-72-74-75=295	+11	3,085
T10	(United States) Patty Hayes	75-72-74-74=295	+11	3,085
