= Grant Thornton Invitational =

Golf tournament

Tournament information
- Location: Naples, Florida
- Established: 2023
- Course: Tiburón Golf Club
- Par: 72
- Length: 7,382 yards (6,750 m)
- Tours: PGA Tour; LPGA Tour
- Format: Stroke play
- Prize fund: US$4,000,000
- Month played: December

Tournament record score
- Aggregate: 188 Lauren Coughlin and Andrew Novak (2025)
- To par: −28 as above

Current champion
- (United States) Lauren Coughlin and (United States) Andrew Novak

Location map
- Location in the United States Location in Florida

The Grant Thornton Invitational is an annual golf tournament for two-player mixed teams, consisting of PGA Tour and LPGA Tour players. It is held at the Tiburón Golf Club in the Naples, Florida. It was first played in 2023 and replaced the QBE Shootout on the PGA Tour schedule.

== History ==
The tournament features 16 mixed teams, each made up of one player from the LPGA Tour and one from the PGA Tour. It debuted as the first mixed-team event since the end of the JCPenney Classic in 1999. It consists of three rounds: 18 holes of scramble, 18 holes of foursomes (alternate shot), and 18 holes of modified four-ball.

The inaugural tournament was won by New Zealander Lydia Ko and Australian Jason Day, who bested a Canadian team by a single stroke.

== Winners ==
Year	Winners	Score	To par	Margin of victory	Runners-up
2025	(United States) Lauren Coughlin and (United States) Andrew Novak	188	−28	3 strokes	(United States) Michael Brennan and (England) Charley Hull, (United States) Chris Gotterup and (United States) Jennifer Kupcho, (United States) Nelly Korda and (United States) Denny McCarthy
2024	(United States) Jake Knapp and (Thailand) Patty Tavatanakit	189	−27	1 stroke	(South Korea) Tom Kim and (Thailand) Atthaya Thitikul
2023	(Australia) Jason Day and (New Zealand) Lydia Ko	190	−26	1 stroke	(Canada) Corey Conners and (Canada) Brooke Henderson
