= Lynn Adams (golfer) =

American professional golfer (born 1950)

Personal information
- Nationality: United States
- Born: August 18, 1950 (age 76) Kingsville, Texas, U.S.
- Height: 5 ft 9 in (1.75 m)

Career
- Sport: Golf
- College: Texas A&I University
- Status: Professional
- Former tour: LPGA Tour (1978–1994)
- Professional wins: 1

Number of wins by tour
- LPGA Tour: 1

Best results in LPGA major championships
- Chevron Championship: T11: 1989
- Women's PGA C'ship: T12: 1988
- U.S. Women's Open: T18: 1982
- du Maurier Classic: T22: 1979

Lynn Adams (born August 18, 1950) is an American professional golfer who played on the LPGA Tour.

== Career ==
In 1972, Adams graduated from Texas A&I, now known as Texas A&M University–Kingsville, with a degree in education.

It took Adams three tries to graduate from LPGA Qualifying School. Her rookie season was in 1978.

Adams won once on the LPGA Tour in 1983.

On July 2, 1983, her hometown of Kingsville, Texas honored her with "Lynn Adams Day."

== Professional wins (1) ==
=== LPGA Tour wins (1) ===
No.	Date	Tournament	Winning score	Margin of victory	Runners-up
1	Apr 17, 1983	Combanks Orlando Classic	–8 (71-66-71=208)	2 strokes	(United States) Janet Anderson (United States) JoAnne Carner

LPGA Tour playoff record (0–1)

No.	Year	Tournament	Opponent	Result
1	1989	USX Golf Classic	(United States) Betsy King	Lost to birdie on first extra hole
