= 2004 Kraft Nabisco Championship =

Coordinates: 33.798°N 116.433°W

Tournament information
- Dates: March 25–28, 2004
- Location: Rancho Mirage, California
- Courses: Mission Hills Country Club; Dinah Shore Tourn. Course
- Tour: LPGA Tour
- Format: Stroke play - 72 holes

Statistics
- Par: 72
- Length: 6,520 yards (5,962 m)
- Field: 99 players, 77 after cut
- Cut: 152 (+8)
- Prize fund: $1.6 million
- Winner's share: $240,000

Champion
- (South Korea) Grace Park
- 277 (−11)

Location in the United States
Location in California

The 2004 Kraft Nabisco Championship was a women's professional golf tournament, held March 25–28 at Mission Hills Country Club in Rancho Mirage, California. This was the 33rd edition of the Kraft Nabisco Championship, and the 22nd edition as a major championship.

Grace Park won her only major title by one stroke, sinking a 6-foot (1.8 m) birdie putt on the 72nd hole. Only moments earlier, runner-up Aree Song had dropped a 30-foot (9 m) eagle putt to tie. Long-time tournament director Terry Wilcox called this Kraft Nabisco "the most thrilling he can recall."

The top amateur was 14-year-old Michelle Wie, four strokes back in fourth place.

Defending champion Patricia Meunier-Lebouc gave birth to her first child in February and opted not to participate.

== Final leaderboard ==
Sunday, March 28, 2004

Place	Player	Score	To par	Money ($)
1	(South Korea) Grace Park	72-69-67-69=277	−11	240,000
2	(South Korea) (Thailand) Aree Song	66-73-69-70=278	−10	146,826
3	(Australia) Karrie Webb	68-71-71-69=279	−9	106,512
4	(United States) Michelle Wie (a)	69-72-69-71=281	−7	0
T5	(United States) Cristie Kerr	71-71-71-69=282	−6	74,358
T5	(Scotland) Catriona Matthew	67-75-70-70=282	−6	74,358
7	(South Korea) Mi Hyun Kim	71-70-71-71=283	−5	54,261
T8	(United States) Rosie Jones	67-73-71-73=284	−4	36,737
T8	(United States) Christina Kim	72-72-70-70=284	−4	36,737
T8	(Taiwan) Candie Kung	69-75-71-69=284	−4	36,737
T8	(South Korea) Jung Yeon Lee	69-69-71-75=284	−4	36,737
T8	(Mexico) Lorena Ochoa	67-76-74-67=284	−4	36,737

Amateurs: Michelle Wie (−7), Jane Park (+2), Liz Janangelo (+6), Paula Creamer (+7).
