= Patty Hayes =

American professional golfer (born 1955)

Personal information
- Nationality: United States
- Born: January 12, 1955 (age 71)
- Height: 5 ft 6 in (1.68 m)

Career
- Sport: Golf
- Status: Professional
- Former tours: LPGA Tour (1974-1995); ALPG Tour
- Professional wins: 1

Number of wins by tour
- LPGA Tour: 1

Best results in LPGA major championships
- Chevron Championship: T31: 1984
- Women's PGA C'ship: T22: 1977
- U.S. Women's Open: T10: 1980
- du Maurier Classic: 4th: 1981

Patty Hayes (born January 12, 1955) is an American professional golfer who played on the LPGA Tour.

Hayes won once on the LPGA Tour in 1981.

== Professional wins ==
=== LPGA Tour wins (1) ===
No.	Date	Tournament	Winning score	Margin of victory	Runner-up
1	Mar 15, 1981	Sun City Classic	−15 (69-69-70-69=277)	2 strokes	(United States) Sandra Palmer
