= 1979 Peter Jackson Classic =

Coordinates: 45.5969°N 73.2842°W

The 1979 Peter Jackson Classic was contested from July 26–29 at Richelieu Valley Golf Club. It was the 7th edition of the Peter Jackson Classic, and the first edition as a major championship on the LPGA Tour.

This event was won by Amy Alcott.

== Final leaderboard ==
Place	Player	Score	To par	Money (US$)
1	(United States) Amy Alcott	75-70-70-70=285	−7	22,500
2	(United States) Nancy Lopez	76-70-71-71=288	−4	14,700
3	(Argentina) Silvia Bertolaccini	72-73-72-72=289	−3	10,500
4	(United States) Judy Dickinson	72-73-76-69=290	−2	7,500
T5	(United States) Judy Rankin	72-77-72-70=291	−1	5,625
T5	(United States) Donna White	73-71-71-76=291	−1	5,625
T7	(United States) Pam Higgins	72-72-75-73=292	E	4,238
T7	(South Africa) Sally Little	76-72-71-73=292	E	4,238
T7	(United States) Barbara Moxness	73-71-72-76=292	E	4,238
T7	(Canada) Sandra Post	74-75-73-70=292	E	4,238
