= Linda Adams =

Linda or Lynda Adams may refer to:

- Linda Adams, English folk singer and founder of Fellside Records
- Linda Adams, character in Escape by Night (1937 film)
- Lynda Adams (1920–1997), diver

== See also ==
- Lynn Adams (disambiguation)
