= 2009 Kraft Nabisco Championship =

Coordinates: 33.798°N 116.433°W

Tournament information
- Dates: April 2–5, 2009
- Location: Rancho Mirage, California
- Courses: Mission Hills Country Club; Dinah Shore Tourn. Course
- Tour: LPGA Tour
- Format: Stroke play - 72 holes

Statistics
- Par: 72
- Length: 6,673 yards (6,102 m)
- Field: 95 players, 70 after cut
- Cut: 152 (+8)
- Prize fund: $2.0 million
- Winner's share: $300,000

Champion
- (United States) Brittany Lincicome
- 279 (−9)

Location in the United States
Location in California

The 2009 Kraft Nabisco Championship was played April 2–5 at Mission Hills Country Club in Rancho Mirage, California. This was the 38th edition of the Kraft Nabisco Championship and the 27th as a women's major golf championship.

Brittany Lincicome, age 23, eagled the final hole to win her first major, one stroke ahead of runner-up Cristie Kerr; the victory was her third on the LPGA Tour. Down a stroke on the 72nd hole, Lincicome's second shot at the 485-yard (443 m) par-5 stopped within four feet (1.2 m) of the flagstick and she sank the putt. Defending champion Lorena Ochoa finished eight strokes back, tied for twelfth.

== Round summaries ==
=== First round ===
Thursday, April 2, 2009

Place	Player	Score	To par
1	(United States) Brittany Lincicome	66	−6
T2	(United States) Brittany Lang	67	−5
T2	(South Korea) Ji-young Oh	67	−5
T2	(United States) Angela Stanford	67	−5
5	(United States) Kristy McPherson	68	−4
T6	(Australia) Katherine Hull	69	−5
T6	(United States) Christina Kim	69	−5
T6	(South Korea) Song-Hee Kim	69	−5
T6	(South Korea) Jee-Young Lee	69	−5
T6	(South Korea) Ji-Hee Lee	69	−5
T6	(Taiwan) Yani Tseng	69	−5

=== Second round ===
Friday, April 3, 2009

Place	Player	Score	To par
T1	(United States) Christina Kim	69-69=138	−6
T1	(United States) Kristy McPherson	68-70=138	−6
3	(United States) Cristie Kerr	71-68=139	−5
4	(United States) Brittany Lincicome	66-74=140	−4
T5	(South Korea) Jimin Kang	71-70=141	−3
T5	(Australia) Lindsey Wright	70-71=141	−3
T7	(Sweden) Helen Alfredsson	72-70=142	−2
T7	(United States) Paula Creamer	70-72=142	−2
T7	(United States) Pat Hurst	71-71=142	−2
T7	(United States) Angela Stanford	67-75=142	−2

=== Third round ===
Saturday, April 4, 2009

Place	Player	Score	To par
1	(United States) Kristy McPherson	68-70-70=208	−8
2	(United States) Cristie Kerr	71-68-70=209	−7
3	(United States) Brittany Lincicome	66-74-70=210	−6
T4	(South Korea) Jimin Kang	71-70-71=212	−5
T4	(Australia) Lindsey Wright	70-71-71=212	−5
6	(United States) Christina Kim	69-69-75=213	−3
T7	(Sweden) Helen Alfredsson	72-70-72=214	−2
T7	(United States) Meaghan Francella	72-73-69=214	−2
T7	(Australia) Katherine Hull	69-74-71=214	−2
10	(United States) Pat Hurst	71-71-73=215	−3

=== Final round ===
Sunday, April 5, 2009

Place	Player	Score	To par	Money ($)
1	(United States) Brittany Lincicome	66-74-70-69=279	−9	300,000
T2	(United States) Cristie Kerr	71-68-70-71=280	−8	161,831
T2	(United States) Kristy McPherson	68-70-70-72=280	−8	161,831
4	(Australia) Lindsey Wright	70-71-71-70=282	−6	105,268
T5	(United States) Meaghan Francella	72-73-69-69=283	−5	77,026
T5	(Norway) Suzann Pettersen	71-72-74-66=283	−5	77,026
7	(United States) Christina Kim	69-69-75-72=285	−3	58,026
T8	(Australia) Katherine Hull	69-74-71-72=286	−2	44,162
T8	(United States) Pat Hurst	71-71-73-71=286	−2	44,162
T8	(South Korea) Jimin Kang	71-70-71-74=286	−2	44,162
T8	(Australia) Karrie Webb	73-72-72-69=286	−2	44,162

Amateurs: Joh (+2), Thompson (+2), Muñoz (+7).

==== Scorecard ====
Final round

Hole	1	2	3	4	5	6	7	8	9	10	11	12	13	14	15	16	17	18
Par	4	5	4	4	3	4	4	3	5	4	5	4	4	3	4	4	3	5
(United States) Lincicome	−6	−6	−6	−6	−6	−6	−6	−7	−8	−8	−8	−7	−7	−7	−7	−7	−7	−9
(United States) Kerr	−7	−8	−8	−9	−9	−9	−9	−9	−9	−9	−9	−9	−8	−9	−7	−7	−7	−8
(United States) McPherson	−8	−7	−7	−7	−6	−6	−7	−7	−8	−9	−9	−9	−8	−8	−8	−8	−8	−8
(Australia) Wright	−4	−4	−4	−4	−4	−4	−4	−4	−4	−4	−6	−6	−6	−6	−6	−6	−6	−6
(United States) Francella	−2	−3	−4	−4	−5	−6	−5	−5	−5	−5	−5	−5	−5	−5	−5	−5	−5	−5
(Norway) Pettersen	+1	E	−1	−1	−1	−2	−3	−4	−4	−4	−4	−4	−4	−4	−4	−4	−5	−5

Cumulative tournament scores, relative to par

Eagle	Birdie	Bogey	Double bogey
