= Desmond Muirhead =

English-born American golf course designer

- Born: March 23, 1923; Norwich, U.K.
- Died: May 2, 2002 (aged 79); Newport Beach, California, U.S.
- Education: University of Cambridge; University of British Columbia; University of Oregon
- Occupation: Golf course designer
- Spouse: Helen Muirhead
- Children: 3 daughters

Gordon Desmond Muirhead (March 23, 1923 – May 2, 2002) was an English-born American golf course designer.

== Early life ==
Desmond Muirhead was born on March 23, 1923, in Norwich, England. He graduated from the University of Cambridge, the University of British Columbia and the University of Oregon.

== Career ==
Muirhead designed many golf courses, including the Dinah Shore Tournament Course at the Mission Hills Country Club in Rancho Mirage, California. With Jack Nicklaus, he designed Muirfield Village in Dublin, Ohio.

According to the Honolulu Advertiser, he "became one of the most respected golf course designers" in the United States. An article in Golf Digest suggested that Muirhead "showed chutzpah in drawing inspiration from art, literature and Mother Nature but went off the deep end with fish bunkers and mermaid holes."

== Personal life and death ==
Muirhead had a wife, Helen, and three daughters. They resided in Newport Beach, California, where he died on May 2, 2002.
