= Mayflower Classic =

Golf tournament formerly on the LPGA Tour

The Mayflower Classic was a golf tournament on the LPGA Tour from 1976 to 1988. It was played at three different course in Indiana.

== Tournament locations ==
Years	Venue	Location
1976	Lake Monroe at the Pointe Golf Course	Bloomington, Indiana
1977–1980	Harbour Trees Golf Club	Noblesville, Indiana
1981–1988	Country Club of Indianapolis	Indianapolis, Indiana

== Winners ==
Bloomington Bicentennial Classic

- 1976 Sandra Palmer

Mayflower Classic

- 1977 Judy Rankin
- 1978 Jane Blalock
- 1979 Hollis Stacy
- 1980 Amy Alcott
- 1981 Debbie Austin
- 1982 Sally Little
- 1983 Lauren Howe
- 1984 Ayako Okamoto
- 1985 Alice Miller
- 1986 Sandra Palmer (2)
- 1987 Colleen Walker
- 1988 Terry-Jo Myers
