= Grace Park (golfer) =

South Korean professional golfer (born 1979)

Grace Park 박지은
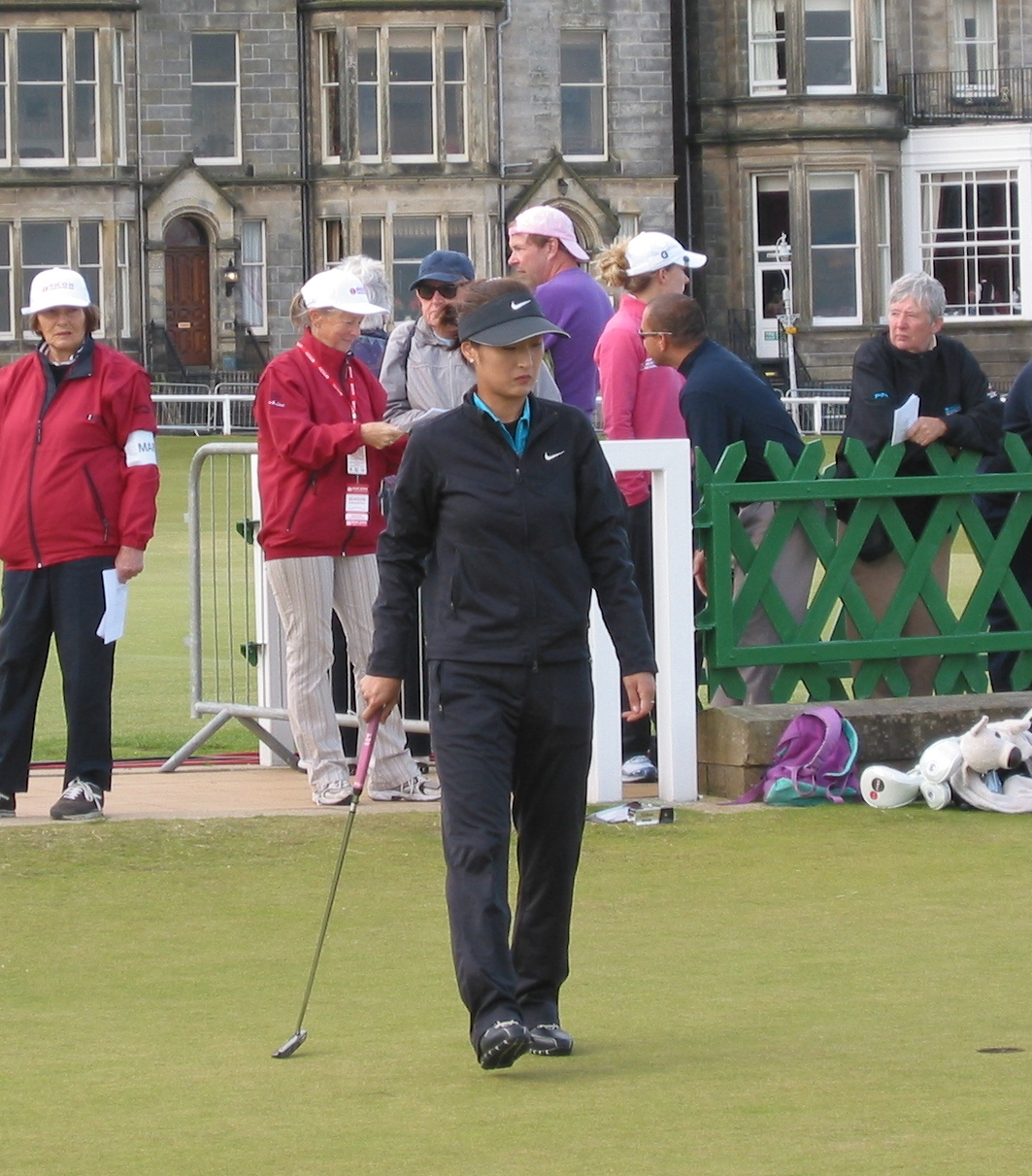

Personal information
- Full name: Grace Park
- Nationality: South Korea
- Born: 6 March 1979 (age 47) Seoul, South Korea
- Height: 168 cm (5 ft 6 in)

Career
- Sport: Golf
- College: Arizona State University; Ewha Womans University
- Turned professional: 1999
- Former tours: Futures Tour (joined 1999); LPGA Tour (joined 2000)
- Professional wins: 11

Number of wins by tour
- LPGA Tour: 6
- Epson Tour: 5

Best results in LPGA major championships (wins: 1)
- Chevron Championship: Won: 2004
- Women's PGA C'ship: 2nd: 2003
- U.S. Women's Open: T6: 2000
- du Maurier Classic: DNP
- Women's British Open: T3: 2003

Achievements and awards
- Futures Tour Player of the Year: 2002
- LPGA Vare Trophy: 2004
- Honda Award: 1999

- Grace Park
- Hangul: 박지은
- RR: Bak Jieun
- MR: Pak Chiŭn

Grace Park (born 6 March 1979), born Park Ji-eun (Korean: 박지은), is a South Korean retired professional golfer on the LPGA Tour. She was a member of the LPGA Tour from 2000 until her retirement in 2012 and won six LPGA Tour events, including one major championship, during her career.

== Early life ==
In 1979, Park was born in Seoul, South Korea. She moved to Hawaii at the age of 12, and then to Arizona. In 1996, she received the Dial Award as top female high-school scholar-athlete in the United States.

== Amateur career ==
Park attended Arizona State University and graduated from Ewha Womans University. For the 1998-99 season, she won the Honda Award (now the Honda Sports Award) as the best female collegiate golfer in the nation.

Park had an outstanding amateur career in the United States being Rolex Junior Player of the Year in 1994 and 1996. She won several amateur championships in 1998 including the U.S. Women's Amateur and the Women's Western Amateur. She tied for eighth as an amateur in the 1999 U.S. Women's Open.

== Professional career ==
In 1999, Park turned professional. She decided to play on the Futures Tour instead of taking invitations to LPGA Tour tournaments. She won five of the ten tournaments she entered and became one of the first threes golfers to gain automatic LPGA Tour exempt status by finishing top of the money list. She was named Rookie of the Year and Player of the Year.

She won at least one LPGA tournament in each season from 2000 to 2004, including her only major, the 2004 Kraft Nabisco Championship. The years 2005 and 2006 were difficult for Park as she suffered from back and neck injuries, and success continued to elude her the following two seasons as well. In April 2009, it was reported that Park had undergone a successful hip surgery, and that she would be off the LPGA tour for several months.

In June 2012, Park announced her retirement from golf.

The Boston Globe has described Park as "the striking beauty, the tall and proud walk, the dazzling smile" and she has attracted sponsorship from Nike and Rolex.

== Awards and honors ==
- In 1996, Park received one of two Dial Awards bestowed that year, given to the top female and male high school athletes in the United States by the Dial Corporation.
- In 1999, she won the Honda Award as the best female collegiate golfer in the nation.
- In 2002, she earned Futures Tour Rookie of the Year and Futures Tour Player of the Year honors.
- In 2004, Park won the LPGA Vare Trophy, bestowed to the golfer with the lowest scoring average.

== Professional wins (11) ==
=== LPGA Tour wins (6) ===
Legend
LPGA Tour major championships (1)
Other LPGA Tour (5)

No.	Date	Tournament	Winning score	To par	Margin of victory	Runner(s)-up
1	4 Jun 2000	Kathy Ireland Greens.com LPGA Classic	66-68-70-70=274	−14	1 stroke	(United States) Pat Hurst (United States) Juli Inkster
2	28 Jan 2001	The Office Depot	70-69-70-71=280	−6	1 stroke	(Australia) Karrie Webb
3	3 Nov 2002	Cisco World Ladies Match Play Championship	22 holes			(Japan) Midori Yoneyama
4	4 May 2003	Michelob Light Open at Kingsmill	67-68-69-71=275	−9	1 stroke	(United States) Cristie Kerr (Mexico) Lorena Ochoa (Australia) Karrie Webb
5	28 Mar 2004	Kraft Nabisco Championship	72-69-67-69=277	−11	1 stroke	(South Korea) Aree Song
6	31 Oct 2004	CJ Nine Bridges Classic	66-69-65=200	−16	5 strokes	(Sweden) Carin Koch (Sweden) Annika Sörenstam

LPGA Tour playoff record (0–1)

No.	Year	Tournament	Opponent	Result
1	2003	McDonald's LPGA Championship	(Sweden) Annika Sörenstam	Lost to par on first extra hole

=== Futures Tour wins (5) ===
- 1999 (5) Betty Puskar FUTURES Golf Classic, YWCA Briarwood FUTURES Open, SmartSpikes FUTURES Classic, Carolina National FUTURES Classic, Greater Lima FUTURES Open

== Major championships ==
=== Wins (1) ===
Year	Championship	Winning score	Margin	Runner-up
2004	Kraft Nabisco Championship	−11 (72-69-67-69=277)	1 stroke	(South Korea) Aree Song

=== Results timeline ===
Tournament	1995	1996	1997	1998	1999	2000
Kraft Nabisco Championship	CUT		CUT	23	T39	
LPGA Championship						CUT
U.S. Women's Open	T63		CUT		T8	T6
du Maurier Classic						

Tournament	2001	2002	2003	2004	2005	2006	2007	2008	2009	2010	2011	2012
Kraft Nabisco Championship	T28	T9	CUT	1	5	T35	T69	CUT	CUT	T10	CUT	CUT
LPGA Championship	T30	T15	2	3	WD	CUT	CUT			WD	77	T71
U.S. Women's Open	T39	T18	T10	T64	T52		CUT	CUT				
Women's British Open ^	T32	T53	T3	T13	T8		T50	CUT			CUT	

^ The Women's British Open replaced the du Maurier Classic as an LPGA major in 2001.

Win
Top 10
Did not play

CUT = missed the half-way cut
WD = withdrew
"T" = tied

=== Summary ===
Tournament	Wins	2nd	3rd	Top-5	Top-10	Top-25	Events	Cuts made
Kraft Nabisco Championship	1	0	0	2	4	5	16	9
lPGA Championship	0	1	1	2	2	3	11	6
U.S. Women's Open	0	0	0	0	3	4	11	8
du Maurier Classic	0	0	0	0	0	0	0	0
Women's British Open	0	0	1	1	2	3	8	6
Totals	1	1	2	5	11	15	46	29

- Most consecutive cuts made – 9 (2000 U.S. Open – 2002 British)
- Longest streak of top-10s – 5 (2003 LPGA – 2004 LPGA)

== Team appearances ==
Amateur

- Espirito Santo Trophy (representing South Korea): 1998

Professional

- Lexus Cup (representing Asia team): 2005, 2006 (winners)
