= Cisco World Ladies Match Play Championship =

Golf tournament formerly on the LPGA Tour

The Cisco World Ladies Match Play Championship was a golf tournament on the LPGA Tour and LPGA of Japan Tour in 2001 and 2002. It was played in Narita, Japan. It was played at the Sohsei Country Club in 2001 and at the Narita Golf Club in 2002. The field each year was 32 players, 16 from each tour.

== Winners ==
- 2002 Grace Park
- 2001 Annika Sörenstam
