= Mazda Hall of Fame Championship =

Golf tournament formerly on the LPGA Tour

The Mazda Hall of Fame Championship was a golf tournament on the LPGA Tour from 1985 to 1986. It was played at the Sweetwater Country Club in Sugar Land, Texas.

== Winners ==
- 1986 Amy Alcott
- 1985 Nancy Lopez
