= Amy Alcott =

American professional golfer (born 1956)

Personal information
- Nationality: United States
- Born: February 22, 1956 (age 70) Kansas City, Missouri, U.S.
- Height: 5 ft 6 in (1.68 m)

Career
- Sport: Golf
- Turned professional: 1975
- Current tour: LPGA Tour (joined 1975)
- Professional wins: 34

Number of wins by tour
- LPGA Tour: 29
- LPGA of Japan Tour: 3
- Other: 3

Best results in LPGA major championships (wins: 5)
- Chevron Championship: Won: 1983, 1988, 1991
- Women's PGA C'ship: 2nd: 1978, 1988
- U.S. Women's Open: Won: 1980
- du Maurier Classic: Won: 1979
- Women's British Open: DNP
- Evian Championship: DNP

Achievements and awards
- World Golf Hall of Fame: 1999 (member page)
- LPGA Tour Rookie of the Year: 1975
- Vare Trophy: 1980

Amy Alcott (born February 22, 1956) is an American professional golfer and golf course designer. She became a member of the LPGA Tour in 1975, and won five major championships and 29 LPGA Tour events in all. She is a member of the World Golf Hall of Fame. She was a part of the architectural team that designed the golf course for the 2016 Summer Olympics in Rio de Janeiro.

== Early life ==
Alcott was born in Kansas City, Missouri, and is Jewish.

She won the U.S. Girls' Junior in 1973, She turned pro in 1975 at age 18, directly upon graduating from Palisades High School in Pacific Palisades, Los Angeles.

== Professional career ==
Alcott's first victory came in her third start as a professional at the Orange Blossom Classic on the LPGA Tour. She went on to be named LPGA Tour Rookie of the Year. Alcott won four tournaments in a year three times, in 1979, 1980, and 1984. Her best year came in 1980, when in addition to those four victories she also won the LPGA Vare Trophy for lowest scoring average, finished second five times and was in the Top 10 in 21 out of 28 tournaments played.

Alcott's first major championship victory came at the 1979 Peter Jackson Classic (later renamed the du Maurier Classic). She went on to win the U.S. Women's Open in 1980 and the Nabisco Dinah Shore in three times, in 1983, 1988, and 1991. The 1991 Nabisco Dinah Shore was her final victory on the LPGA Tour. After her win at the 1988 Dinah Shore, Alcott initiated what is now a tradition of the winner leaping into Poppie's Pond to celebrate.

That win was the 29th of her career. At the time, the LPGA Hall of Fame required at least 30 career wins for entry. Alcott chased for the 30th win in vain over the next several years. In 1999, the LPGA switched to a points-based criteria under which Alcott gained admission and she was inducted into the World Golf Hall of Fame.

Alcott is also a member of the National Jewish Museum Sports Hall of Fame, and the Southern California Jewish Sports Hall of Fame.

From 2002 to 2004, the Office Depot Championship Hosted by Amy Alcott was a part of the LPGA Tour.

Following the end of her touring days, Alcott started working in golf course design and also hosted a satellite radio program. She has written an instructional book and taped an instructional video.

In July 2007, Alcott accepted the position as girls' golf coach at Harvard-Westlake School in North Hollywood, California.

== Awards and honors ==
- In 1975, Alcott earned LPGA Tour Rookie of the Year honors.
- In 1980, Alcott earned Golf Magazine's Player of the Year honors.
- In 1980, she also earned the Seagrams Seven Crowns of Sports Award.
- In 1980, she won the Vare Trophy for best scoring average by a player on the LPGA Tour.
- In 1983, Alcott earned a YWCA Silver Achievement Award.
- In 1984, she earned an LPGA Good Samaritan Award.
- In 1984, Alcott earned a National Multiple Sclerosis Achievement Award.
- In 1990, Alcott earned entry into the Southern California Jewish Sports Hall of Fame.
- In 1997, Alcott earned a Sports and Law Award along with Kareem Abdul-Jabbar.
- In 1999, she was inducted into the World Golf Hall of Fame.
- Alcott is a member of the National Jewish Museum Sports Hall of Fame.

== Professional wins (33) ==
=== LPGA Tour wins (29) ===
Legend
LPGA Tour major championships (5)
Other LPGA Tour (24)

No.	Date	Tournament	Winning score	Margin of victory	Runner(s)-up
1	Feb 23, 1975	Orange Blossom Classic	−9 (68-69-71=207)	1 stroke	(Canada) Sandra Post
2	May 23, 1976	'76 LPGA Classic	−4 (71-71-67=209)	1 stroke	(United States) Jane Blalock
3	Nov 27, 1976	Colgate Far East Open	−5 (72-72-67=211)	1 stroke	(United States) Donna Caponi
4	Oct 9, 1977	Houston Exchange Clubs Classic	−8 (68-70-70=208)	5 strokes	(United States) Carol Mann (United States) Kathy Postlewait (United States) Donna White
5	Apr 23, 1978	American Defender Classic	−10 (71-67-68=206)	Playoff	(United States) Hollis Stacy
6	Feb 18, 1979	Elizabeth Arden Classic	−3 (70-70-72-73=285)	Playoff	(Canada) Sandra Post
7	Jul 29, 1979	Peter Jackson Classic	−7 (75-70-70-70=285)	3 strokes	(United States) Nancy Lopez
8	Oct 14, 1979	United Virginia Bank Classic	−2 (70-70-73-73=286)	1 stroke	(United States) Susie McAllister
9	Nov 3, 1979	Mizuno Japan Classic^{1}	−11 (71-73-67=211)	1 stroke	(Canada) Sandra Post
10	Apr 13, 1980	American Defender/WRAL Classic	−10 (68-69-69=206)	4 strokes	(United States) Donna Caponi
11	Jul 6, 1980	Mayflower Classic	−13 (69-65-72-69=275)	3 strokes	(United States) JoAnne Carner (South Africa) Sally Little
12	Jul 13, 1980	U.S. Women's Open	−5 (70-70-68-72=280)	9 strokes	(United States) Hollis Stacy
13	Oct 12, 1980	Inamori Golf Classic	−12 (69-69-72-70=280)	4 strokes	(United States) Beth Daniel (United States) Patty Hayes
14	Feb 22, 1981	Bent Tree Ladies Classic	−12 (71-67-71-67=276)	1 stroke	(United States) JoAnne Carner
15	May 10, 1981	Lady Michelob	−7 (69-74-66=209)	1 stroke	(South Africa) Sally Little
16	Mar 28, 1982	Women's Kemper Open	−6 (72-74-69-71=286)	1 stroke	(United States) JoAnne Carner
17	Apr 3, 1983	Nabisco Dinah Shore	−6 (70-70-70-72=282)	2 strokes	(United States) Beth Daniel (United States) Kathy Whitworth
18	May 13, 1984	United Virginia Bank Classic	−6 (71-70-69=210)	2 strokes	(United States) Cathy Marino
19	Jul 1, 1984	Lady Keystone Open	−8 (74-69-65=208)	1 stroke	(United States) Juli Inkster (United States) Martha Nause
20	Sep 9, 1984	Portland Ping Championship	−4 (69-73-71=212)	3 strokes	(United States) Kathy Guadagnino
21	Sep 23, 1984	San Jose Classic	−8 (69-70-72=211)	2 strokes	(United States) Betsy King (United States) Beverly Klass (United States) Pat Meyers (United States) Kathy Whitworth
22	Feb 24, 1985	Circle K Tucson Open	−9 (74-69-69-67=279)	1 stroke	(United States) Betsy King
23	May 5, 1985	Moss Creek Women's Invitational	−4 (72-70-73-69=284)	4 strokes	(United States) Juli Inkster (United States) Nancy Lopez (United States) Kathy Postlewait (United States) Patty Sheehan
24	Aug 18, 1985	Nestle World Championship of Women's Golf	−14 (65-70-70-69=274)	Playoff	(United States) Patty Sheehan
25	Jul 6, 1986	Mazda Hall of Fame Championship	−4 (70-70-72-72=284)	Playoff	(United States) Lauren Howe
26	Aug 3, 1986	LPGA National Pro-Am	−5 (72-69-72-70=283)	1 stroke	(United States) Pat Bradley (United States) Christa Johnson
27	Apr 3, 1988	Nabisco Dinah Shore	−14 (71-66-66-71=274)	2 strokes	(United States) Colleen Walker
28	Jul 23, 1989	Boston Five Classic	−16 (68-68-68-68=272)	3 strokes	(United States) Cathy Marino
29	Mar 31, 1991	Nabisco Dinah Shore	−15 (67-70-68-68=273)	8 strokes	(United States) Dottie Mochrie

^{1}Co-sanctioned by the LPGA of Japan Tour

LPGA Tour playoff record (4–5)

No.	Year	Tournament	Opponent(s)	Result
1	1975	Charity Golf Classic	(United States) Sandra Haynie (United States) Judy Rankin	Haynie won with par on fourth extra hole Rankin eliminated by par on first hole
2	1978	American Defender Classic	(United States) Hollis Stacy	Won with birdie on first extra hole
3	1979	Elizabeth Arden Classic	(Canada) Sandra Post	Won with eagle on third extra hole
4	1980	CPC Women's International	(United States) Hollis Stacy	Lost to birdie on first extra hole
5	1981	Inamori Classic	(United States) Donna Caponi (United States) Hollis Stacy (Australia) Jan Stephenson	Stacy won with birdie on first extra hole
6	1985	Nestle World Championship of Women's Golf	(United States) Patty Sheehan	Won with birdie on second extra hole
7	1985	LPGA National Pro-Am	(United States) Pat Bradley	Lost to birdie on second extra hole
8	1986	Mazda Hall of Fame Championship	(United States) Lauren Howe	Won with birdie on first extra hole
9	1986	Konica San Jose Classic	(United States) Betsy King (Japan) Ayako Okamoto (United States) Patty Sheehan	Sheehan won with birdie on first extra hole

=== LPGA of Japan Tour wins (3) ===
- 1979 Mizuno Japan Classic^{1}
- 1980 Pioneer Cup
- 1981 Mitsukoshi Ladies Open

^{1}Co-sanctioned by the LPGA Tour

=== Other wins (2) ===
- 1981 Mr. Goodwrench Invitational (with Larry Nelson)
- 1986 Mazda Champions (with Bob Charles)

=== Legends Tour wins (1) ===
- 2019 ANA Inspiration Legends Day

== Major championships ==
=== Wins (5) ===
Year	Championship	Winning score	Margin	Runner(s)-up
1979	Peter Jackson Classic	−7 (75-70-70-70=285)	3 strokes	(United States) Nancy Lopez
1980	U.S. Women's Open	−4 (70-70-68-72=280)	9 strokes	(United States) Hollis Stacy
1983	Nabisco Dinah Shore	−6 (70-70-70-72=282)	2 strokes	(United States) Beth Daniel, (United States) Kathy Whitworth
1988	Nabisco Dinah Shore	−14 (71-66-66-71=274)	2 strokes	(United States) Colleen Walker
1991	Nabisco Dinah Shore	−15 (67-70-68-68=273)	8 strokes	(United States) Dottie Mochrie

=== Results timeline ===
Results not in chronological order before 2015.

Tournament	1975	1976	1977	1978	1979	1980
Women's PGA Championship	CUT	CUT	T34	2	3	T10
U.S. Women's Open	18	T5	T4	T12	T37	1
du Maurier Classic					1	T10

Tournament	1981	1982	1983	1984	1985	1986	1987	1988	1989	1990
ANA Inspiration			1	T10	T31	T14	T11	1	T62	T34
Women's PGA Championship	9	T5	T26	T52	T8	T15	T9	2	T14	T46
U.S. Women's Open	T19	T13	T11	T3	11	T5	T12	T41	T26	T9
du Maurier Classic	T25	WD	T13	T10	3	T8	T14	T4	T4	CUT

Tournament	1991	1992	1993	1994	1995	1996	1997	1998	1999	2000
ANA Inspiration	1	T32	T56	T58	CUT	T23	T57	T40	T33	CUT
Women's PGA Championship	10	T10	CUT	T7	CUT	CUT	T67	CUT	CUT	CUT
U.S. Women's Open	3	T13	T26	T6	T63		CUT	CUT		
du Maurier Classic	T44	CUT	T25	T14	T33	T36	T52	CUT	CUT	T65

Tournament	2001	2002	2003	2004	2005	2006	2007	2008	2009	2010
ANA Inspiration	CUT	T68	CUT	77	CUT	CUT	CUT	CUT		
Women's PGA Championship	T54			CUT		WD				
U.S. Women's Open										
Women's British Open ^										

Tournament	2011	2012	2013	2014	2015
ANA Inspiration			CUT	CUT	CUT
Women's PGA Championship					
U.S. Women's Open					
Women's British Open ^					
The Evian Championship ^^					

^ The Women's British Open replaced the du Maurier Classic as an LPGA major in 2001.
^^ The Evian Championship was added as a major in 2013.

Win
Top 10
Did not play

CUT = missed the half-way cut.
WD = withdrew
"T" = tied

=== Summary ===
Tournament	Wins	2nd	3rd	Top-5	Top-10	Top-25	Events	Cuts made
ANA Inspiration	3	0	0	3	4	7	29	18
Women's PGA Championship	0	2	1	4	11	13	29	19
U.S. Women's Open	1	0	2	6	8	16	23	21
Women's British Open	0	0	0	0	0	0	0	0
The Evian Championship	0	0	0	0	0	0	0	0
du Maurier Classic	1	0	1	4	7	12	22	17
Totals	5	2	4	17	30	48	103	75

- Most consecutive cuts made – 31 (1983 Nabisco Dinah Shore – 1990 U.S. Women's Open)
- Longest streak of top-10s – 5 (1979 du Maurier Classic – 1981 LPGA)

== Team appearances ==
Professional

- Handa Cup (representing the United States): 2006 (winners), 2007 (winners), 2008 (winners), 2009 (winners), 2010 (winners)

== See also ==
- List of golfers with most LPGA major championship wins
- List of golfers with most LPGA Tour wins
- List of Jewish golfers
