= 1995 Nabisco Dinah Shore =

Coordinates: 33.798°N 116.433°W

Tournament information
- Dates: March 23–26, 1995
- Location: Rancho Mirage, California
- Courses: Mission Hills Country Club; Dinah Shore Tourn. Course
- Tour: LPGA Tour
- Format: Stroke play - 72 holes

Statistics
- Par: 72
- Length: 6,460 yards (5,907 m)
- Field: 116 players, 77 after cut
- Cut: 153 (+9)
- Prize fund: $850,000
- Winner's share: $127,500

Champion
- (United States) Nanci Bowen
- 285 (−3)

Location in the United States
Location in California

The 1995 Nabisco Dinah Shore was a women's professional golf tournament, held March 23–26 at Mission Hills Country Club in Rancho Mirage, California. This was the 24th edition of the Nabisco Dinah Shore, and the thirteenth as a major championship.

Nanci Bowen won her only major title, one stroke ahead of runner-up Susie Redman; it was her sole victory on the LPGA Tour. Tammie Green was the 54-hole leader, followed by Nancy Lopez and Laura Davies, but all three were over par on Sunday. Bowen and Redman were four strokes back after three rounds at 215 (−1); Bowen was one shot better in the final round with 70 and won.

== Final leaderboard ==
Sunday, March 26, 1995

Place	Player	Score	To par	Money ($)
1	(United States) Nanci Bowen	69-75-71-70=285	−3	127,500
2	(United States) Susie Redman	75-70-70-71=286	−2	79,129
T3	(United States) Brandie Burton	76-71-71-69=287	−1	42,237
T3	(England) Laura Davies	75-69-70-73=287	−1	42,237
T3	(United States) Nancy Lopez	74-71-68-74=287	−1	42,237
T3	(United States) Sherri Turner	72-74-71-70=287	−1	42,237
T7	(United States) Tammie Green	71-70-70-77=288	E	23,738
T7	(United States) Colleen Walker	74-73-69-72=288	E	23,738
9	(Canada) Dawn Coe-Jones	71-75-71-72=289	+1	20,103
10	(England) Caroline Pierce	77-71-73-69=290	+2	17,964

=== Scorecard ===
Final round

Hole	1	2	3	4	5	6	7	8	9	10	11	12	13	14	15	16	17	18
Par	4	5	4	4	3	4	4	3	5	4	5	4	4	3	4	4	3	5
(United States) Bowen	E	−1	−2	−2	−1	−1	−2	−2	−2	−2	−2	−2	−2	−2	−3	−3	−4	−3
(United States) Redman	−1	−1	E	E	E	E	E	E	−1	E	E	+1	E	E	−1	−1	−1	−2
(England) Davies	−2	−1	E	E	E	E	+1	+1	+1	+1	E	E	−1	−1	−1	−1	−1	−1
(United States) Lopez	−4	−5	−5	−5	−4	−4	−4	−4	−4	−4	−4	−5	−5	−4	−3	−2	−2	−1
(United States) Green	−5	−4	−3	−3	−3	−2	−2	−2	−3	−2	−2	−3	−3	−3	−3	−3	−2	E

Cumulative tournament scores, relative to par

Birdie	Bogey	Double bogey
