= Patty Tavatanakit =

Thai professional golfer (born 1999)

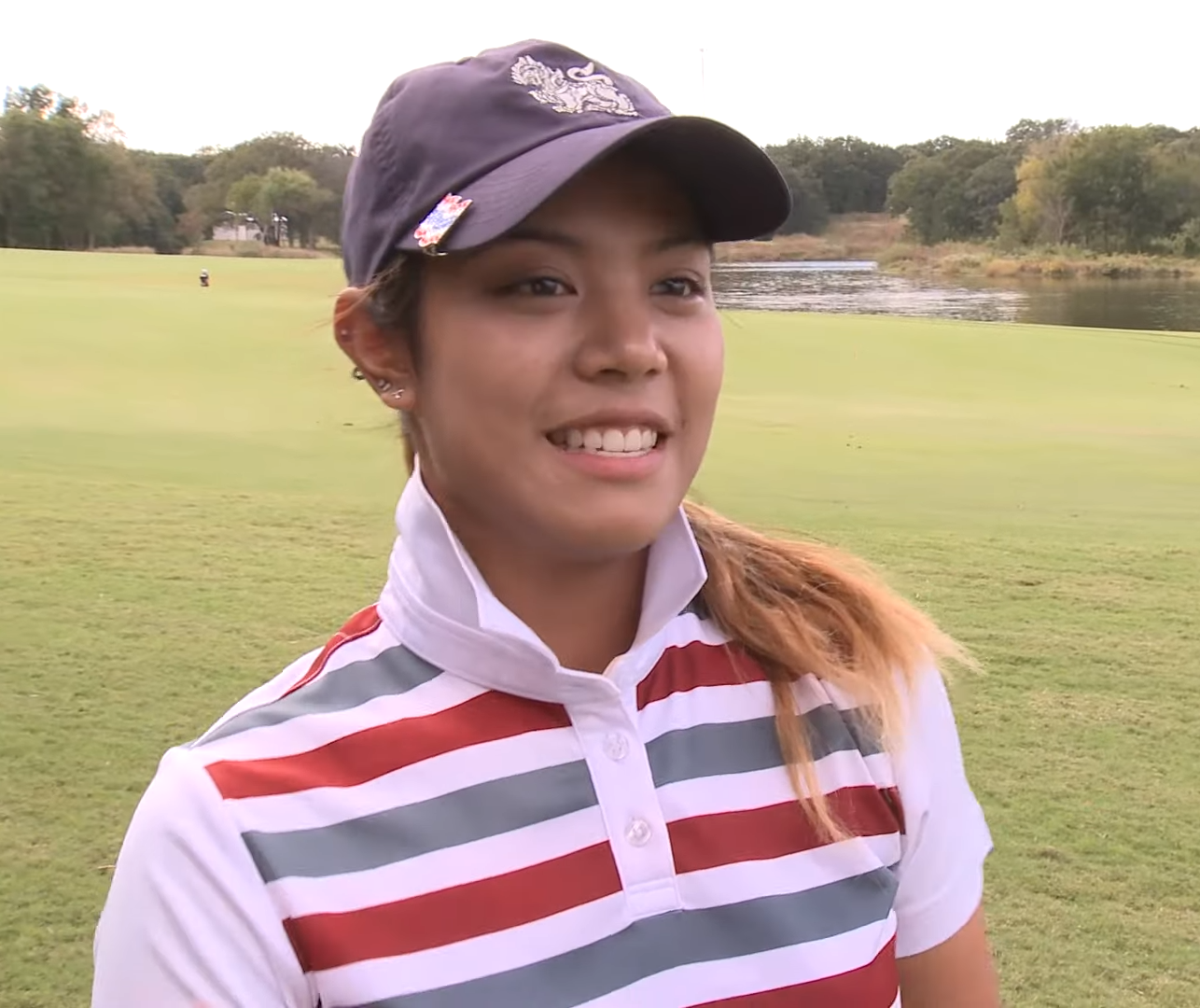
- Tavatanakit in 2016

Personal information
- Full name: Paphangkorn Tavatanakit
- Nicknames: Patty, Meow
- Nationality: Thailand
- Born: 11 October 1999 (age 27) Bangkok, Thailand
- Height: 5 ft 5 in (165 cm)

Career
- Sport: Golf
- College: UCLA
- Turned professional: 2020
- Current tour: LPGA Tour (joined 2020)
- Professional wins: 7

Number of wins by tour
- LPGA Tour: 2
- Ladies European Tour: 1
- Epson Tour: 3
- Other: 1

Best results in LPGA major championships (wins: 1)
- Chevron Championship: Won: 2021
- Women's PGA C'ship: T5: 2021
- U.S. Women's Open: T5: 2018
- Women's British Open: T7: 2021
- Evian Championship: 3rd: 2024

Achievements and awards
- LPGA Tour Rookie of the Year: 2021
- Rolex Annika Major Award: 2021
- Symetra Tour Rookie of the Year: 2019

Paphangkorn "Patty" Tavatanakit (Thai: ปภังกร ธวัชธนกิจ; born 11 October 1999) is a Thai professional golfer who plays on the LPGA Tour. She won her first major championship at the 2021 ANA Inspiration during her rookie season.

After turning professional in 2020, Tavatanakit earned the 2021 Louise Suggs Rolex Rookie of the Year and the Rolex Annika Major Award. In 2024, she secured victories at the Ladies European Tour's Aramco Saudi Ladies International and the Honda LPGA Thailand.

== Early life ==
Tavatanakit was born in Bangkok, Thailand. She attended Keerapat International School, a high school in Bangkok, and graduated before moving to the United States for her collegiate career.

== Amateur career ==
Tavatanakit started playing golf during her teen years while attending Keerapat International School in Bangkok, which did not have a dedicated golf team. Her junior career gained momentum in 2014 when she won the girls' division of the Callaway Junior World Golf Championships. She was later named the 2015–2016 Thailand Amateur Ladies Golf Association Player of the Year, a recognition bolstered by her victories at the American Junior Golf Association (AJGA) Rolex Tournament of Champions and the PING Invitational.

Tavatanakit played collegiate golf for the UCLA Bruins from 2017 to 2019, securing seven tournament victories during her tenure. She earned numerous accolades, including being named the Women's Golf Coaches Association (WGCA) and Pac-12 Freshman of the Year. Furthermore, she was recognized as a two-time WGCA First Team All-American and an All-Pac-12 First Team member.

In 2018, while still an amateur, she competed in the U.S. Women's Open and finished tied for fifth, earning low amateur honors.

== Professional career ==
Tavatanakit began her professional career in 2019 on the Symetra Tour. She won three titles in her first eight tournament starts: the Donald Ross Classic, the Danielle Downey Credit Union Classic, and the Sioux Falls GreatLIFE Challenge. These performances earned her the Symetra Tour Rookie of the Year award and secured her card for the LPGA Tour.

During her 2020 rookie season, which was shortened by the COVID-19 pandemic, Tavatanakit made her LPGA debut at the Gainbridge LPGA at Boca Rio in January, finishing tied for 35th. She competed in 14 LPGA events throughout the year, retaining her tour status.

On 4 April 2021, Tavatanakit won her first LPGA Tour and major championship title at the 2021 ANA Inspiration. She held off a final-round charge by Lydia Ko, finishing at 18-under-par. She was later named the 2021 Louise Suggs Rolex Rookie of the Year.

After going winless on the LPGA Tour in 2022 and 2023, Tavatanakit won two consecutive tournaments in early 2024. In February, she won the Aramco Saudi Ladies International on the Ladies European Tour by seven strokes. The following week, she won her second career LPGA Tour title at the Honda LPGA Thailand, edging out Albane Valenzuela by a single stroke. In December 2024, she partnered with Jake Knapp to win the mixed-team Grant Thornton Invitational. Tavatanakit maintained consistent form into 2026, highlighted by a tie for second at the 2026 Chevron Championship.

In April 2026, she continued her strong play in major championships by tying for second at the 2026 Chevron Championship.

== Amateur wins ==
- 2013 TehBotol International Junior
- 2014 TrueVisions Singha Junior #3, TrueVisions International Junior Championship, LA Junior Open, TrueVisions Singha Junior #9
- 2015 LA Junior Open
- 2016 Rolex Tournament of Champions, The PING Invitational
- 2017 Stanford Intercollegiate
- 2018 Silverado Showdown, Pac-12 Championship, NCAA San Francisco Regional, ANNIKA Intercollegiate
- 2019 NCAA East Lansing Regional

== Professional wins (7) ==
=== LPGA Tour wins (2) ===
Legend
Major championships (1)
Other LPGA Tour (1)

#	Date	Tournament	Winning score	To par	Margin of victory	Runner-up	Winner's share ($)	Ref.
1	4 Apr 2021	ANA Inspiration	66-69-67-68=270	−18	2 strokes	(New Zealand) Lydia Ko	465,000	
2	25 Feb 2024	Honda LPGA Thailand	67-67-66-67=267	−21	1 stroke	(Switzerland) Albane Valenzuela	255,000	

=== Ladies European Tour wins (1) ===
#	Date	Tournament	Winning score	To par	Margin of victory	Runner-up	Winner's share ($)	Ref.
1	18 Feb 2024	Aramco Saudi Ladies International	66-70-69-65=270	−18	7 strokes	(Germany) Esther Henseleit	750,000	

=== Symetra Tour wins (3) ===
#	Date	Tournament	Winning score	To par	Margin of victory	Runner(s)-up	Winner's share ($)	Ref.
1	13 Jul 2019	Donald Ross Classic	66-70-64=200	−13	3 strokes	(Chinese Taipei) Ssu-Chia Cheng	33,750	
2	21 Jul 2019	Danielle Downey Credit Union Classic	69-67-65-67=268	−20	7 strokes	(United States) Jenny Coleman	26,250	
3	1 Sep 2019	Sioux Falls GreatLIFE Challenge	70-65-70-62=267	−13	Playoff	(South Korea) Yujeong Son	33,750	

==== Symetra Tour playoff record (1–0) ====
#	Year	Tournament	Opponent	Result	Ref.
1	2019	Sioux Falls GreatLIFE Challenge	(South Korea) Yujeong Son	Won with birdie on first extra hole	

=== Other wins (1) ===
#	Date	Tournament	Winning score	To par	Margin of victory	Runner(s)-up	Winner's share ($)	Ref.
1	15 Dec 2024	Grant Thornton Invitational (with (United States) Jake Knapp)	58-66-65=189	−27	1 stroke	(South Korea) Tom Kim and (Thailand) Atthaya Thitikul	500,000	

== Major championships ==
=== Wins (1) ===
Year	Championship	54 holes	Winning score	Margin	Runner-up
2021	ANA Inspiration	5 shot lead	−18 (66-69-67-68=270)	2 strokes	(New Zealand) Lydia Ko

=== Results timeline ===
Results not in chronological order.

Tournament	2017	2018	2019	2020	2021	2022	2023	2024	2025	2026
Chevron Championship	CUT		T26LA	T64	1	T4	T41	CUT	CUT	T2
U.S. Women's Open	CUT	T5LA	T34	CUT	T26	CUT	T27	CUT	CUT	T22
Women's PGA Championship				74	T5	CUT	CUT	T24	T52	T37
Evian Championship	CUT			NT		CUT	T48	3	T43	T26
Women's British Open				CUT	T7	CUT	CUT	T60	T63	T23

Win
Top 10
Did not play

LA = low amateur
CUT = missed the half-way cut
NT = no tournament
T = tied

=== Summary ===
Tournament	Wins	2nd	3rd	Top-5	Top-10	Top-25	Events	Cuts made
Chevron Championship	1	1	0	3	3	3	9	6
U.S. Women's Open	0	0	0	1	1	2	10	5
Women's PGA Championship	0	0	0	1	1	2	7	5
The Evian Championship	0	0	1	1	1	1	6	4
Women's British Open	0	0	0	0	1	2	7	4
Totals	1	1	1	6	7	10	39	24

- Most consecutive cuts made – 8 (2025 Women's PGA – 2026 Women's BritishOpen, current)
- Longest streak of top-10s – 3 (2021 Women's PGA – 2022 Chevron)

== LPGA Tour career summary ==
Year	Tournaments played	Cuts made	Wins	2nd	3rd	Top 10s	Best finish	Earnings ($)	Money list rank	Scoring average	Scoring rank
2020	14	7	0	0	0	1	T9	84,923	92	72.93	104
2021	18	16	1	0	2	10	1	1,393,437	6	69.83	11
2022	21	12	0	0	0	2	T4	429,664	60	71.75	90
2023	23	18	0	0	1	2	T3	497,303	57	71.45	71
2024	18	15	1	0	1	4	1	1,231,694	21	70.94	29
2025	22	18	0	0	0	3	T4	602,758	60	70.81	42
Totals^	116	86	2	0	4	22	1	4,239,779	123		

^Official as of 2025 season

== World ranking ==
Position in Women's World Golf Rankings for each calendar year.

Year	World ranking	Source
2018	237	
2019	152	
2020	162	
2021	13	
2022	54	
2023	72	
2024	26	
2025	56	

== Team appearances ==
Amateur

- Patsy Hankins Trophy (representing Asia/Pacific): 2016 (winners), 2018 (winners)
- Arnold Palmer Cup (representing the International team): 2018
- Queen Sirikit Cup (representing Thailand): 2015, 2016

Professional

- International Crown (representing Thailand): 2023 (winners)

== Awards ==
- 2021 Louise Suggs Rolex Rookie of the Year, LPGA Tour
- 2021 Rolex Annika Major Award
- 2019 Gaëlle Truet Rookie of the Year, Symetra Tour
