= Nanci Bowen =

American professional golfer (born 1967)

Personal information
- Nationality: United States
- Born: March 31, 1967 (age 59) Tifton, Georgia, U.S.
- Height: 5 ft 6 in (1.68 m)

Career
- Sport: Golf
- College: University of Georgia
- Turned professional: 1991
- Former tours: LPGA Tour (1992–2005); Futures Tour
- Professional wins: 4

Number of wins by tour
- LPGA Tour: 1
- Epson Tour: 3

Best results in LPGA major championships (wins: 1)
- Chevron Championship: Won: 1995
- Women's PGA C'ship: T17: 1994
- U.S. Women's Open: T41: 1998
- du Maurier Classic: T23: 1996
- Women's British Open: DNP

Achievements and awards
- Futures Tour Player of the Year: 1993

Nanci Bowen (born March 31, 1967) is an American professional golfer.

== Career ==
In 1967, Bowen was born in Tifton, Georgia. She attended the University of Georgia.

In 1991, Bowen had her rookie season on the LPGA Tour. Her highlight victory on the tour came at one of the major championships, the 1995 Nabisco Dinah Shore.

As of 2015, Bowen is a teaching professional in Greenville, South Carolina.

== Professional wins (4) ==
=== LPGA Tour wins (1) ===
Legend
LPGA Tour major championships (1)
Other LPGA Tour (0)

No.	Date	Tournament	Winning score	Margin of victory	Runner-up
1	Mar 26, 1995	Nabisco Dinah Shore	−3 (69-75-71-70=285)	1 stroke	(United States) Susie Redman

=== Futures Tour wins (3) ===
- 1990 Christa McAuliffe Futures Classic
- 1993 The Toledo Bend Futures Classic, Colony Creek Futures Classic

== Major championships ==
=== Wins (1) ===
Year	Championship	Winning score	Margin	Runner-up
1995	Nabisco Dinah Shore	−3 (69-75-71-70=285)	1 stroke	(United States) Susie Redman

=== Results timeline ===
Tournament	1985	1986	1987	1988	1989	1990	1991	1992	1993	1994	1995	1996	1997	1998	1999	2000
Kraft Nabisco Championship											1	T23	T5	T65	T39	T17
LPGA Championship							T26			T17	T26	CUT	T31	CUT	T36	CUT
U.S. Women's Open	CUT	CUT	CUT	CUT	CUT	CUT	T57	T48	CUT	T49	CUT	CUT	T43	T41		
du Maurier Classic										CUT	CUT	T23	T37	T73	WD	CUT

Tournament	2001	2002	2003	2004	2005
Kraft Nabisco Championship	T48	CUT	T57	CUT	CUT
LPGA Championship					
U.S. Women's Open					
Women's British Open ^					

^ The Women's British Open replaced the du Maurier Classic as an LPGA major in 2001

Win
Top 10
Did not play

CUT = missed the half-way cut
WD = withdrew
"T" = tied for place

=== Summary ===
Tournament	Wins	2nd	3rd	Top-5	Top-10	Top-25	Events	Cuts made
Kraft Nabisco Championship	1	0	0	2	2	4	11	8
LPGA Championship	0	0	0	0	0	1	8	5
U.S. Women's Open	0	0	0	0	0	0	14	5
du Maurier Classic	0	0	0	0	0	1	7	3
Women's British Open	0	0	0	0	0	0	0	0
Totals	1	0	0	2	2	6	40	21

- Most consecutive cuts made – 6 (1996 du Maurier – 1998 Nabisco)
- Longest streak of top-10s – 1 (twice)
