= Donna Andrews (golfer) =

American professional golfer (born 1967)

Personal information
- Nationality: United States
- Born: April 12, 1967 (age 59) Lynchburg, Virginia, U.S.
- Height: 5 ft 8 in (1.73 m)
- Spouse: James Tepatti (m. 2005)
- Children: 2

Career
- Sport: Golf
- College: North Carolina
- Turned professional: 1989
- Former tour: LPGA Tour (1990–2005)
- Professional wins: 9

Number of wins by tour
- LPGA Tour: 6
- Other: 3

Best results in LPGA major championships (wins: 1)
- Chevron Championship: Won: 1994
- Women's PGA C'ship: T2: 1998
- U.S. Women's Open: T2: 1993
- du Maurier Classic: T6: 1992
- Women's British Open: CUT: 2002

Donna Andrews (born April 12, 1967) is an American professional golfer who played on the LPGA Tour. She won six times on the tour including one major, the 1994 Nabisco Dinah Shore.

== Early life and amateur career ==
Andrews was born in 1967 in Lynchburg, Virginia. She played college golf at the University of North Carolina. She won the 1988 North and South Women's Amateur held at Pinehurst.

== Professional career ==
Andrews' rookie season on the LPGA Tour was 1990; she won six titles between 1993 and 1998, including a major championship, the 1994 Nabisco Dinah Shore, won with a birdie on the final hole. Her best finish on the money list was third in 1998, and she also made the top ten in 1993 (9th) and 1994 (5th). Andrews represented the United States in the Solheim Cup in 1994 and 1998, and was the captain of the Junior Solheim Cup team in 2007.

After her retirement from LPGA Tour, Andrews became a golf instructor at Pine Needles Resort near Pinehurst, North Carolina and is co-owner of Andrews and James Real Estate.

== Personal life ==
Andrews has two children with husband James Tepatti.

== Awards and honors ==
- In 2005, Andrews was inducted into the Virginia Sports Hall of Fame.
- In 2017, she became the first woman inducted into the Virginia Golf Hall of Fame.
- In 2018, Andrews was inducted to the North Carolina Sports Hall of Fame.

== Professional wins (9) ==
=== LPGA Tour wins (6) ===
Legend
LPGA Tour major championships (1)
Other LPGA Tour (5)

No.	Date	Tournament	Winning score	To par	Margin of victory	Runner(s)-up
1	Sep 12, 1993	Ping-Cellular One LPGA; Golf Championship (Portland)	69-69-70=208	−8	1 stroke	(United States) Tina Barrett (United States) Missie McGeorge
2	Mar 13, 1994	PING/Welch's Championship (Tucson)	66-68-69-73=276	−12	3 strokes	(United States) Brandie Burton (United States) Judy Dickinson
3	Mar 27, 1994	Nabisco Dinah Shore	70-69-67-70=276	−12	1 stroke	(England) Laura Davies
4	Jun 26, 1994	ShopRite LPGA Classic	67-66-74=207	−6	2 strokes	(United States) Michelle Estill
5	Mar 16, 1997	Welch's/Circle K Championship	68-67-70-68=273	−15	1 stroke	(United States) Tina Barrett
6	Apr 5, 1998	Longs Drugs Challenge	70-69-70-69=278	−10	1 stroke	(Sweden) Carin Koch

LPGA Tour playoff record (0–3)

No.	Year	Tournament	Opponent(s)	Result
1	1992	The Phar-Mor in Youngstown	(United States) Beth Daniel (United States) Betsy King (United States) Meg Mallon	King won with birdie on first extra hole
2	1998	Sara Lee Classic	(Peru) Jenny Lidback (United States) Nancy Lopez (United States) Barb Mucha	Mucha won with birdie on second extra hole
3	1998	Michelob Light Classic	(Sweden) Annika Sörenstam	Lost to birdie on second extra hole

=== Other wins (3) ===
- 1993 Nichirei International
- 1994 Nichirei International
- 1996 JCPenney Classic (with Mike Hulbert)

== Major championships ==
=== Wins (1) ===
Year	Championship	54 holes	Winning score	Margin	Runner-up
1994	Nabisco Dinah Shore	1 shot lead	−12 (70-69-67-70=276)	1 stroke	(England) Laura Davies

=== Results timeline ===
Tournament	1990	1991	1992	1993	1994	1995	1996	1997	1998	1999	2000
ANA Inspiration				T19	1	T73	T23	T16	T5	T21	T53
Women's PGA Championship		CUT	T12	T11	T17	CUT	T63	T16	T2		CUT
U.S. Women's Open	T19	CUT	3	T2	T9	CUT	CUT	T9	T19	T20	T23
du Maurier Classic		T44	T6	T30	CUT	T46	CUT	T11	T22	CUT	CUT

Tournament	2001	2002	2003	2004	2005	2006	2007	2008	2009	2010
ANA Inspiration	T48	T49	T64	T28	T62					
Women's PGA Championship	T54	CUT	T20		CUT					
U.S. Women's Open	CUT	T18	12	T44						
Women's British Open ^		CUT								

Tournament	2011	2012	2013	2014	2015	2016	2017	2018
ANA Inspiration								CUT
Women's PGA Championship								
U.S. Women's Open								
Women's British Open ^								
The Evian Championship ^^								

^ The Women's British Open replaced the du Maurier Classic as an LPGA major in 2001 ^^ The Evian Championship was added as a major in 2013

Win
Top 10
Did not play

CUT = missed the half-way cut
"T" = tied for place

=== Summary ===
Tournament	Wins	2nd	3rd	Top-5	Top-10	Top-25	Events	Cuts made
ANA Inspiration	1	0	0	2	2	6	14	13
Women's PGA Championship	0	1	0	1	1	6	13	8
U.S. Women's Open	0	1	1	2	4	10	15	11
du Maurier Classic	0	0	0	0	1	3	10	6
Women's British Open	0	0	0	0	0	0	1	0
The Evian Championship	0	0	0	0	0	0	0	0
Totals	1	2	1	5	8	25	53	38

- Most consecutive cuts made – 11 (1991 du Maurier Classic – 1994 U.S. Open)
- Longest streak of top-10s – 2 (twice)

== U.S. national team appearances ==
Professional

- Solheim Cup: 1994 (winners), 1998 (winners)
