= 1994 Nabisco Dinah Shore =

Coordinates: 33.798°N 116.433°W

Tournament information
- Dates: March 24–27, 1994
- Location: Rancho Mirage, California
- Courses: Mission Hills Country Club; Dinah Shore Tourn. Course
- Tour: LPGA Tour
- Format: Stroke play – 72 holes

Statistics
- Par: 72
- Length: 6,446 yards (5,894 m)
- Field: 109 players, 78 after cut
- Cut: 150 (+6)
- Prize fund: $700,000
- Winner's share: $105,000

Champion
- (United States) Donna Andrews
- 276 (−12)

Location in the United States
Location in California

The 1994 Nabisco Dinah Shore was a women's professional golf tournament, held March 24–27 at Mission Hills Country Club in Rancho Mirage, California. This was the 23rd edition of the Nabisco Dinah Shore, and the twelfth as a major championship.

Tournament host Dinah Shore died of cancer a month earlier on February 24. On the Tuesday of tournament week, it was announced that the LPGA had elected her an honorary member of its Hall of Fame.

Donna Andrews won her only major title by a stroke over runner-up Laura Davies; a two-shot swing took place on the 72nd hole, as Andrews scored a birdie while Davies made bogey. She started the annual tradition by jumping into Poppie's Pond, which continues to now. Andrews began the round with a one-stroke lead over Davies, and both shot 70.

== Final leaderboard ==
Sunday, March 27, 1994

Place	Player	Score	To par	Money ($)
1	(United States) Donna Andrews	70-69-67-70=276	−12	105,000
2	(England) Laura Davies	70-68-69-70=277	−11	65,165
3	(United States) Tammie Green	70-72-69-68=279	−9	47,553
4	(Australia) Jan Stephenson	70-69-70-71=280	−8	36,985
5	(United States) Michelle McGann	70-68-70-73=281	−7	29,940
T6	(United States) Brandie Burton	73-73-65-72=283	−5	21,251
T6	(Canada) Gail Graham	73-71-71-68=283	−5	21,251
T6	(United States) Kelly Robbins	73-70-69-71=283	−5	21,251
T9	(United States) Nancy Lopez	68-72-73-71=284	−4	15,674
T9	(United States) Hollis Stacy	72-72-70-70=284	−4	15,674

=== Scorecard ===
Hole	1	2	3	4	5	6	7	8	9	10	11	12	13	14	15	16	17	18
Par	4	5	4	4	3	4	4	3	5	4	5	4	4	3	4	4	3	5
(United States) Andrews	−10	−10	−10	−10	−11	−11	−10	−10	−11	−11	−11	−12	−12	−12	−12	−12	−11	−12
(England) Davies	−9	−10	−10	−10	−10	−10	−10	−10	−11	−11	−12	−12	−12	−12	−12	−12	−12	−11

Cumulative tournament scores, relative to par

Birdie	Bogey
