= Chevron Championship =

Women's major golf tournament

The Chevron Championship

Tournament information
- Location: Memorial Park, Houston
- Established: 1972, 54 years ago; 1983 (major championship)
- Course: Memorial Park Golf Course
- Par: 72
- Length: 6,811 yards (6,228 m)
- Organized by: HNS Sports
- Tour: LPGA Tour
- Format: Stroke play - 72 holes
- Prize fund: US$9.0 million
- Month played: April

Tournament record score
- Aggregate: 269 Dottie Pepper (1999)
- To par: −19 Dottie Pepper (1999)

Current champion
- (United States) Nelly Korda

Final champion
- 2026 Chevron Championship
- Location in the United States Location in Texas

The Chevron Championship is a professional women's golf tournament. An event on the LPGA Tour, it is one of the tour's five major championships, and has traditionally been the first of the season since its elevation to major status in 1983. Since 2023, it has been played in the Greater Houston area.

Founded in 1972 by singer and actress Dinah Shore and Colgate-Palmolive chairman David Foster, it was played at the Mission Hills Country Club in Rancho Mirage, California, from its inception through 2022. Sometimes referred to as The Dinah Shore in deference to its founder, the tournament has had many official sponsored titles, all of which included Shore's name until 2000. It relocated to Houston in 2023 due to a new sponsorship agreement with Chevron Corporation. The tournament was held at the Jack Nicklaus Signature Course in The Woodlands from 2023 to 2025, and will move to Houston's Memorial Park course beginning 2026.

The championship's time at Mission Hills is associated with several traditions; in 1988, Amy Alcott established a tradition of the event's champion diving into the pond that surrounds the 18th hole—a tradition that would be carried over to the tournament's future hosts. An annual women's festival that originally coincided with the championship has been held since 1991.

== History ==
Founded in 1972 by Colgate-Palmolive chairman David Foster and entertainer Dinah Shore, the championship has been classified as a major since 1983. From its inception, it had been held annually at Shore's favorite course, the Mission Hills Country Club in Rancho Mirage, California, southeast of Palm Springs. It is the first major of the year, usually played in late March or early April.

At its debut in 1972 as a 54-hole event, it was the richest event in women's golf; its purse was more than double that of the LPGA Championship or the U.S. Women's Open. The first edition invited all winners of tour events from the previous ten seasons.

After over twenty years of sponsorship by Nabisco, and parent company Kraft Foods, Japanese airline All Nippon Airways became the title sponsor of the tournament in late 2014, renaming the tournament the ANA Inspiration (in reference to its slogan "Inspiration of Japan").

In October 2021, a six-year sponsorship agreement with energy company Chevron Corporation was announced that would see the tournament renamed The Chevron Championship, with an increased prize fund of $5 million in 2022 (up from $3 million in 2021).

It was also announced that the tournament would move to the Jack Nicklaus Signature Course at The Club at Carlton Woods in The Woodlands, Texas in 2023, with a new mid-April scheduling. Dinah Shore's daughter Melissa Montgomery established an advisory board to oversee the tournament's transition. Officials intended the date change to allow for network television coverage on NBC. It was also suggested that the tournament was moved in deference to the Augusta National Women's Amateur, which had begun to conflict with the tournament in 2019. Following the move, the Dinah Shore's traditional weekend at Mission Hills was taken up by the PGA Tour Champions' Galleri Classic.

In January 2026, it was announced that the tournament would move to Houston's Memorial Park Golf Course—the host of the PGA Tour's Houston Open—for 2026.

=== Tournament names ===
Years	Tournament name
1972–1980	Colgate-Dinah Shore Winner's Circle
1981	Colgate-Dinah Shore
1982	Nabisco Dinah Shore Invitational
1983–1999	Nabisco Dinah Shore
2000–2001	Nabisco Championship
2002–2014	Kraft Nabisco Championship
2015–2021	ANA Inspiration
from 2022	The Chevron Championship

Informally, it is commonly referred to as "the Dinah Shore,"
even though her name was removed from the official title in 2000.
The winner's trophy bears Shore's name.

=== "Poppie's Pond" ===
From 1988 to 2022, the winner traditionally celebrated her victory by jumping in the pond surrounding the 18th green. The pond is known as Champions Lake or "Poppie's Pond" as it was dubbed in 2006 honor of Terry Wilcox, the tournament director from 1994 through 2008; Wilcox is known as "Poppie" to his grandchildren.

Amy Alcott established the tradition in 1988 to celebrate her second win here, and repeated in 1991, including tournament host Dinah Shore. It was not embraced by others until 1994, when Donna Andrews made the leap, followed by Nanci Bowen the next year, and it became an annual tradition. In 1998, winner Pat Hurst waded in only up to her knees, as she could not swim. Originally a very natural water hazard, the portion near the bridge was later lined with concrete and has treated water, more like a swimming pool.

The tradition was carried over to The Woodlands; the lake between the 9th and 18th holes was dredged, cleaned, and had netting installed to protect against alligators, and a dock and ladder was built on the 18th hole. Prior to the 2023 tournament, several players expressed uncertainty over whether they would take the jump—now into a natural lake instead of the treated pool used in Mission Hills. Its first champion, Lilia Vu, would take the jump into the lake. With the move to Memorial Park, a man-made pond will be constructed near Memorial Park's 18th green in time for the 2027 tournament, with a temporary concrete-lined pool being used for 2026; organizers hoped the dedicated construction would alleviate the hesitancy over the lake jump used at The Woodlands.

=== Associated events ===
A women's festival known as the Club Skirts Dinah Shore Weekend has been held in the city of Palm Springs, California, featuring concerts by female musicians, comedy shows, parties, and other events and networking opportunities. The Dinah Shore Weekend was first organized in 1991 by promoter Mariah Hanson; it expanded upon afterparties that had become associated with the Dinah Shore tournament, and, until 2021, was held in the same week.

A large number of lesbians and bisexual women visited the Palm Springs area for the festival and tournament; the Dinah Shore Weekend was described by Los Angeles as the "largest annual gathering of queer women and their female allies", while the tournament as a whole had been described as "spring break for lesbians." The event continues to be held annually in Palm Springs; ahead of the tournament's relocation, the festival moved to an autumn scheduling beginning in 2021 due to weather conditions and lower hotel costs. The delay was also initially induced by the COVID-19 pandemic.

== Winners ==
Year	Dates	Champion	Country	Score		To par	Margin of victory	Purse ($)	Winner's share ($)
2026	Apr 23–26	Nelly Korda (2)	United States	65-65-70-70	270	−18	5 strokes	9,000,000	1,350,000
2025	Apr 24–27	Mao Saigo	Japan	70-68-69-74	281	−7	Playoff	8,000,000	1,200,000
2024	Apr 18–21	Nelly Korda	United States	68-69-69-69	275	−13	2 strokes	7,900,000	1,200,000
2023	Apr 20–23	Lilia Vu	United States	68-69-73-68	278	−10	Playoff	5,100,000	765,000
2022	Mar 31 – Apr 3	Jennifer Kupcho	United States	66-70-64-74	274	−14	2 strokes	5,000,000	750,000
2021	Apr 1–4	Patty Tavatanakit	Thailand	66-69-67-68	270	−18	2 strokes	3,100,000	465,000
2020	Sep 10–13	Mirim Lee	South Korea	70-65-71-67	273	−15	Playoff	3,100,000	465,000
2019	Apr 4–7	Ko Jin-young	South Korea	69-71-68-70	278	−10	3 strokes	3,000,000	450,000
2018	Mar 29 – Apr 2^	Pernilla Lindberg	Sweden	65-67-70-71	273	−15	Playoff	2,800,000	420,000
2017	Mar 30 – Apr 2	Ryu So-yeon	South Korea	68-69-69-68	274	−14	Playoff	2,700,000	405,000
2016	Mar 31 – Apr 3	Lydia Ko	New Zealand	70-68-69-69	276	−12	1 stroke	2,600,000	390,000
2015	Apr 2–5	Brittany Lincicome (2)	United States	72-68-70-69	279	−9	Playoff	2,500,000	375,000
2014	Apr 3–6	Lexi Thompson	United States	73-64-69-68	274	−14	3 strokes	2,000,000	300,000
2013	Apr 4–7	Inbee Park	South Korea	70-67-67-69	273	−15	4 strokes	2,000,000	300,000
2012	Mar 29 – Apr 1	Sun-Young Yoo	South Korea	69-69-72-69	279	−9	Playoff	2,000,000	300,000
2011	Mar 31 – Apr 3	Stacy Lewis	United States	66-69-71-69	275	−13	3 strokes	2,000,000	300,000
2010	Apr 1–4	Yani Tseng	Taiwan	69-71-67-68	275	−13	1 stroke	2,000,000	300,000
2009	Apr 2–5	Brittany Lincicome	United States	66-74-70-69	279	−9	1 stroke	2,000,000	300,000
2008	Apr 3–6	Lorena Ochoa	Mexico	68-71-71-67	277	−11	5 strokes	2,000,000	300,000
2007	Mar 29 – Apr 1	Morgan Pressel	United States	74-72-70-69	285	−3	1 stroke	2,000,000	300,000
2006	Mar 30 – Apr 2	Karrie Webb (2)	Australia	70-68-76-65	279	−9	Playoff	1,800,000	270,000
2005	Mar 24–27	Annika Sörenstam (3)	Sweden	70-69-66-68	273	−15	8 strokes	1,800,000	270,000
2004	Mar 25–28	Grace Park	South Korea	72-69-67-69	277	−11	1 stroke	1,600,000	240,000
2003	Mar 27–30	Patricia Meunier-Lebouc	France	70-68-70-73	281	−7	1 stroke	1,600,000	240,000
2002	Mar 28–31	Annika Sörenstam (2)	Sweden	70-71-71-68	280	−8	1 stroke	1,500,000	225,000
2001	Mar 22–25	Annika Sörenstam	Sweden	72-70-70-69	281	−7	3 strokes	1,500,000	225,000
2000	Mar 23–26	Karrie Webb	Australia	67-70-67-70	274	−14	10 strokes	1,250,000	187,500
1999	Mar 25–28	Dottie Pepper (2)	United States	70-66-67-66	269	−19	6 strokes	1,000,000	150,000
1998	Mar 26–29	Pat Hurst	United States	68-72-70-71	281	−7	1 stroke	1,000,000	150,000
1997	Mar 27–30	Betsy King (3)	United States	71-67-67-71	276	−12	2 strokes	900,000	135,000
1996	Mar 28–31	Patty Sheehan	United States	71-72-67-71	281	−7	1 stroke	900,000	135,000
1995	Mar 23–26	Nanci Bowen	United States	69-75-71-70	285	−3	1 stroke	850,000	127,500
1994	Mar 24–27	Donna Andrews	United States	70-69-67-70	276	−12	2 strokes	700,000	105,000
1993	Mar 25–28	Helen Alfredsson	Sweden	69-71-72-72	284	−4	2 strokes	700,000	105,000
1992	Mar 26–29	Dottie Mochrie	United States	69-71-70-69	279	−9	Playoff	700,000	105,000
1991	Mar 28–31	Amy Alcott (3)	United States	67-70-68-68	273	−15	8 strokes	600,000	90,000
1990	Mar 29 – Apr 1	Betsy King (2)	United States	69-70-69-75	283	−5	2 strokes	600,000	90,000
1989	Mar 30 – Apr 2	Juli Inkster (2)	United States	66-69-73-71	279	−9	5 strokes	500,000	80,000
1988	Mar 31 – Apr 3	Amy Alcott (2)	United States	71-66-66-71	274	−14	2 strokes	500,000	80,000
1987	Apr 2–5	Betsy King	United States	68-75-72-68	283	−5	Playoff	500,000	80,000
1986	Apr 3–6	Pat Bradley	United States	68-72-69-71	280	−8	2 strokes	430,000	75,000
1985	Apr 4–7	Alice Miller	United States	70-68-70-67	275	−13	3 strokes	400,000	55,000
1984	Apr 5–8	Juli Inkster	United States	70-73-69-68	280	−8	Playoff	400,000	55,000
1983	Mar 31 – Apr 3	Amy Alcott	United States	70-70-70-72	282	−6	2 strokes	400,000	55,000

^ Play extended one day due to darkness.
Note: Green highlight indicates scoring records.

=== Winners as a non-major ===
Year	Champion	Country	Score		To par	Margin of victory	Purse ($)	Winner's share ($)
1982	Sally Little	South Africa	76-67-71-64	278	−10	3 strokes	300,000	45,000
1981	Nancy Lopez	United States	71-73-69-64	277	−11	2 strokes	250,000	37,500
1980	Donna Caponi	United States	71-67-66-71	275	−13	2 strokes	250,000	37,500
1979	Sandra Post (2)	Canada	68-70-68-70	276	−12	1 stroke	250,000	37,500
1978	Sandra Post	Canada	65-75-72-72	283	−5	Playoff	240,000	36,000
1977	Kathy Whitworth	United States	76-70-72-71	289	+1	1 stroke	240,000	36,000
1976	Judy Rankin	United States	74-72-71-68	285	−3	3 strokes	185,000	32,000
1975	Sandra Palmer	United States	70-70-70-73	283	−5	1 stroke	180,000	32,000
1974	Jo Ann Prentice	United States	71-71-74-73	289	+1	Playoff	179,000	32,000
1973	Mickey Wright	United States	71-74-71-68	284	−4	2 strokes	135,000	25,000
1972	Jane Blalock	United States	71-70-72	213	−3	3 strokes	110,000	20,050

== Multiple champions ==
Multiple winners of the event as a major championship.

Champion	Country	Total	Years
Amy Alcott	United States	3	1983, 1988, 1991
Betsy King	United States	3	1987, 1990, 1997
Annika Sörenstam ‡	Sweden	3	2001, 2002, 2005
Juli Inkster ‡	United States	2	1984, 1989
Dottie Pepper	United States	2	1992, 1999
Karrie Webb ‡	Australia	2	2000, 2006
Brittany Lincicome	United States	2	2009, 2015
Nelly Korda	United States	2	2024, 2026

Career Grand Slam winners ‡

Through 2025, the only successful defense of the title (as a major) was by Sörenstam in 2002.

- As a non-major (1972–1982), the only multiple winner was Sandra Post (1978, 1979).

== Tournament records ==
Year	Player	Score	Round
2021	Lydia Ko	62 (−10)	4th
2006	Lorena Ochoa	62 (−10)	1st
