= Mission Hills Country Club =

American country club

- Location within the United States Location within California
- 33.798°N 116.433°W

Club information
- Location: Rancho Mirage, California, U.S.
- Established: 1971
- Type: Private
- Owner: ClubCorp
- Total holes: 54
- Tournaments: Chevron Championship; Galleri Classic
- Website: missionhills.com

Dinah Shore Tournament Course
- Designed by: Desmond Muirhead
- Par: 72
- Length: 7,250 yards (6,629 m)
- Course rating: 75.2
- Slope rating: 140

Arnold Palmer Course
- Designed by: Arnold Palmer
- Par: 72
- Length: 6,805 yards (6,222 m)
- Course rating: 72.6
- Slope rating: 131

Pete Dye Challenge Course
- Designed by: Pete Dye
- Par: 72
- Length: 6,975 yards (6,378 m)
- Course rating: 74.2
- Slope rating: 143

The Mission Hills Country Club is a country club in the western United States, located in Rancho Mirage, California, southeast of Palm Springs.

== Overview ==
Among the facilities at the club are 3 championship golf courses (54 holes), 27 tennis courts of various surfaces, a spa and sports center. It has been owned by ClubCorp since 1993. The tennis venue of the club hosted finals of the Davis Cup in 1978.

== Golf ==
The first course at Mission Hills was designed by Desmond Muirhead and opened 55 years ago in 1971. It is over this course, now known as the Dinah Shore Tournament Course, that the Chevron Championship, one of the five major championships in women's professional golf, was played. It debuted in April 1972 as the "Colgate-Dinah Shore Winner's Circle", the richest event on the LPGA Tour, and became a major in 1983 through 2022.

The second course was designed by Arnold Palmer and opened in 1979. A third course was added in 1988, and originally called the Dinah Shore Course, but with Dinah Shore's name being transferred to the old course after her death in 1994, it was renamed as the Pete Dye Challenge Course.

From 1988 to 2022, the Chevron Championship winner took the traditional jump into Poppie's Pond, next to the bridge at the 18th green. Amy Alcott was the first in 1988, and it had been an annual ritual from 1994 to 2022, when Jennifer Kupcho became the final winner to do it.

The PGA Tour Champions took over the Dinah Shore Tournament Course with the Galleri Classic, now held in March. However, tournament organizers discontinued the tradition of jumping into Poppie's Pond.

== Scorecards ==
Dinah Shore Tournament Course
Tee	Rating/Slope	1	2	3	4	5	6	7	8	9	Out	10	11	12	13	14	15	16	17	18	In	Total
Gold	75.2 / 140	450	520	475	418	185	393	393	185	538	3557	382	554	438	448	191	405	437	192	646	3693	7250
Galleri	(N/A)	420	522	437	421	187	393	393	185	538	3496	399	569	493	451	195	409	462	196	531	3669	7165
Blue	73.6 / 135	375	508	454	410	173	381	363	180	527	3371	375	536	399	424	191	382	418	192	618	3535	6906
White	M: 70.9 / 128 W: 76.4 / 137	344	482	420	375	153	346	334	166	501	3121	354	504	359	387	160	351	384	170	565	3234	6355
Silver	M: 69.5 / 124 W: 74.8 / 136	336	450	402	356	140	335	322	155	476	2972	330	493	334	370	150	345	355	145	496	3018	5990
Par		4	5	4	4	3	4	4	3	5	36	4	5	4	4	3	4	4	3	5	36	72
SI	Men's	11	9	3	5	15	1	13	17	7		10	12	14	4	16	8	2	18	6
Red	M: 68.2 / 120 W: 73.1 / 132	312	446	327	350	139	329	264	128	454	2769	323	488	324	345	132	326	350	137	485	2910	5679
SI	Women's	9	11	13	7	5	1	15	17	3		12	6	8	14	18	4	10	16	2

Arnold Palmer Course
Tee	Rating/Slope	1	2	3	4	5	6	7	8	9	Out	10	11	12	13	14	15	16	17	18	In	Total
Gold	72.6 / 131	406	418	518	166	413	517	174	372	434	3418	370	180	393	405	384	494	408	208	545	3387	6805
Blue	71.3 / 127	401	411	512	156	393	492	145	355	415	3280	370	175	379	389	374	481	387	190	474	3219	6499
White	M: 69.9 / 125 W: 76.0 / 138	385	382	480	147	384	488	141	341	402	3150	354	152	346	367	369	451	324	167	457	2987	6137
Silver	M: 68.4 / 120 W: 73.9 / 133	363	361	463	137	372	470	122	332	378	2998	344	132	319	366	355	442	313	139	426	2697	5482
Par		4	4	5	3	4	5	3	4	4	36	4	3	4	4	4	5	4	3	5	36	72
SI	Men's	11	5	9	15	3	7	17	13	1		16	18	2	6	14	8	4	10	12
Red	M: 66.9 / 115 W: 72.1 / 129	306	337	423	123	367	436	119	298	376	2785	339	121	312	291	350	433	306	136	409	2697	5482
SI	Women's	13	9	3	17	5	1	15	7	11		12	18	6	14	10	8	2	16	4

Pete Dye Challenge Course
Tee	Rating/Slope	1	2	3	4	5	6	7	8	9	Out	10	11	12	13	14	15	16	17	18	In	Total
Gold	74.2 / 143	352	396	215	521	453	185	457	381	563	3523	476	176	367	465	521	353	529	167	398	3452	6975
Blue	72.3 / 137	352	388	206	484	415	166	413	361	538	3323	426	176	346	412	505	353	498	157	372	3245	6568
Blue/White Combo	71.0 / 134	352B	362W	164W	477W	415B	166B	373W	361B	538B	3208	380W	176B	346B	380W	482W	353B	498B	140W	343W	3098	6306
White	M: 69.7 / 131 W: 76.0 / 141	325	362	164	477	375	155	373	333	501	3065	380	154	318	380	482	333	470	140	343	3000	6065
Silver	M: 67.3 / 122 W: 72.9 / 131	325	314	154	426	352	127	304	308	499	2809	331	132	277	338	448	327	433	117	328	2731	5540
Par		4	4	3	5	4	3	4	4	5	36	4	3	4	4	5	4	5	3	4	36	72
SI	Men's	13	1	3	7	5	17	11	9	15		8	18	14	2	10	6	12	16	4
Red	W: 70.4 / 124	271	311	131	426	301	102	296	263	423	2524	325	119	277	318	400	294	421	117	284	2555	5079
SI	Women's	3	1	15	7	13	17	11	5	9		14	18	8	12	6	10	2	16	4

Preceded by White City Stadium; Sydney	Davis Cup; Final Venue; 1978	Succeeded by Bill Graham Auditorium; San Francisco
