= 2026 U.S. Senior Women's Open =

Golf tournament

Tournament information
- Dates: August 20–23, 2026
- Location: Ann Arbor, Michigan, U.S. 42°19′00″N 83°45′21″W
- Course: Barton Hills Country Club
- Organized by: USGA
- Tour: Legends Tour
- Format: 72 holes stroke play

Statistics
- Par: 72
- Length: 6,237 yards (5,703 m)
- Field: 120 players
- Cut: +10 (52 players)
- Prize fund: $1,000,000
- Winner's share: $200,000

Champion
- (Sweden) Maria McBride
- 282 (–6)
- Location in the United States Location in Michigan

The 2026 U.S. Senior Women's Open took place August 20–23 at Barton Hills Country Club in Ann Arbor, Michigan, United States, and was the eighth U.S. Senior Women's Open. It was a professional golf tournament organized by the United States Golf Association (USGA), open to women over 50 years of age and one of two yearly senior women's major golf championships.

Maria McBride won the tournament by two strokes over Annika Sörenstam.

== Venue ==
The championship course, Barton Hills Country Club, located in Washtenaw County six kilometres north of the city center of Ann Arbor, Michigan, was designed by Donald Ross and opened 1922. Restoration of the course in 2012 was led by Ronald Pritchard.

The club hosted the U.S. Women's Amateur in 1998 and the U.S. Women's Mid-Amateur in 2008.

=== Course layout ===
The length was different between each round. Approximate length shown.

Hole	Yards	Par	Hole	Yards	Par
1	342	4	10	474	5
2	524	5	11	161	3
3	400	4	12	337	4
4	335	4	13	382	4
5	139	3	14	353	4
6	358	4	15	390	4
7	383	4	16	169	3
8	156	3	17	475	5
9	511	5	18	348	4
Out	3,148	36	In	3,089	36
			Total	6,237	72

== Format ==
The walking-only tournament was played over 72 holes of stroke play, with the top 50 and ties making the 36-hole cut.

== Field ==
The championship was open to any female professional or amateur golfer who was 50 years of age or over as of August 20, 2026, however restricted by a certain handicap level.

120 players entered the competition, 85 professionals and 35 amateurs. They were either exempt through some of several exemption categories or through sectional qualifying at 16 different sites around the United States during June and July 2026. 61 players were exempt and 54 of them entered the tournament. 66 players qualified through qualifying tournaments. (Note: (a) – denotes amateur)

=== Exempt from qualifying ===
Below are listed exemption categories and players exempt, if any, under those. Each exemption category required players to have reached their 50th birthday on or before August 20, 2026. Players exempt under more than one category are mentioned only under the first category they were exempt. Players written in italic did not play in the tournament.

1. Winners of the U.S. Senior Women’s Open Championship (10-year exemption):

- Laura Davies (did not play), Helen Alfredsson, Annika Sörenstam, Jill McGill (did not play), Trish Johnson, Leta Lindley, Becky Morgan

2. From the 2025 U.S. Senior Women’s Open, the 20 lowest scorers and anyone tying for 20th place:

- Juli Inkster, Liselotte Neumann, Maria McBride, Corina Kelepouris, Janice Moodie, Mikino Kubo, Karrie Webb, Nobuko Kizawa, Michele Redman, Barb Moxness, Moira Dunn-Bohls, Laura Diaz, Catriona Matthew, Audra Burks, Lara Tennant (a), Pat Hurst, Yuko Saito

3. From the 2025 U.S. Senior Women's Open Championship, the amateur(s) returning the lowest 72-hole score:

4. Winners of the U.S. Women's Open Championship (10-year exemption)

- Hollis Stacy, Amy Alcott (did not play), Jan Stephenson (did not play), Jane Geddes

5. From the 2025 and 2026 U.S. Women's Open Championships, any player returning a 72-hole score

6. Any professional or applicant for reinstatement who has won the U.S. Women's Amateur (three-year exemption)

7. Winners of the U.S. Women's Amateur Championship (must be an amateur; five-year exemption)

8. Winners of the 2024 and 2025 U.S. Senior Women's Amateur Championship, and the 2025 runner-up (must be an amateur)

- Nadene Gole (a), Dawn Woodard (a), Sue Wooster (a)

9. Winners of the 2024 and 2025 U.S. Women's Mid-Amateur Championship (must be an amateur)

10. Playing members of the two most current United States and Great Britain & Ireland Curtis Cup Teams, and the two most current United States Women's World Amateur Teams (must be an amateur)

11. Winners of the LPGA Legends Championship 2021–2026, and the runners-up from 2025–2026

12. From the 2026 LPGA Legends Championship, the 10 lowest scorers and anyone tying for 10th place (event held August 13–15, 2026)

13. From the final 2025 Legends of the LPGA Performance Points list, the top 30 point leaders and ties

- Christa Johnson, Ashli Bunch, Heather Bowie Young, Suzy Green-Roebuck, Nicole Jeray, Jackie Gallagher-Smith, Lisa Grimes, Maggie Will, Tracy Hanson, Stefania Croce, Karen Weiss, Cathy Johnston-Forbes, Charlotta Sörenstam

14. Winners of the Legends of the LPGA co-sponsored individual events 2024-2026

15. Winners of the 2021–2025 LPGA Professionals Championship (Championship Division), and the five lowest scorers and ties from the 2025 Championship

16. From the 2025 LPGA Professionals Championship (Senior Division), the three lowest scorers and ties

- Lisa DePaulo, Sara Sanders, Angela Buzminski, Silvia Cavalleri

17. Winners of the 2025 R&A Women's Senior Amateur and 2025 Canadian Women's Senior Amateur Championships (must be an amateur)

- Kathy Hartwiger (a), Shelly Stouffer (a)

18. Winners of the following events when deemed a major by the LPGA Tour: Chevron Championship (1983-present); The Evian Championship (2013-present); Women's Open (1979-present); Women's PGA Championship (1955-present); Titleholders Championship (1946-1966 and 1972); or Western Open (1930-1967). (10-year exemption)

- Alice Miller (did not play), Donna Andrews, Patricia Meunier-Lebouc, Tammie Green, Brandie Burton

19. From the LPGA Tour Career Official Money List, the top 10 age-eligible players who are not otherwise exempt as of February 11, 2026

- Rosie Jones (did not play), Rachel Hetherington, Wendy Ward, Carin Hjalmarsson, Danielle Ammaccapane, Michelle McGann

20. Winners of LPGA Tour co-sponsored events 2021–2026

21. Playing members of the United States and European Solheim Cup Teams 2016–2025

22. From the 2025 final Ladies European Tour and Japan LPGA Tour career money lists, the top five money leaders

23. Special exemptions

=== Qualifiers ===
66 additional players qualified through sectional qualifying tournaments, taking place June 2 – July 16, 2026, at 16 different sites across the United States. (Players are mentioned in order of date of qualifying and place finished within each qualifying competition.)

- Charlaine Hirst, Clarissa Childs, Julie Streng (a), Jane Noble, Lydia Shell (a), Chieko Amanuma, Martha Leach (a), Elaine Crosby, Stacy Slobodnik-Stoll (a), Joanne Lim (a), Shelly Haywood, Eunice Cho (a) (entered alternate), Tara Joy-Connelly (a), C.J. Reeves, Kay Daniel (a), Cindy Lee-Pridgen, Kirsten Larson, Jamie Fischer, Christy Longfield, Shannon Hudson (a), Claudia Ramirez (a), Lynne Cowan (a), Ailam Newkirk (a), Karen Garcia (a), Dana Ebster, Yukako Matsumoto, Sherry Andonian, Terra Shehee, Kayoko Hayashi, Fiona Watson (a) (entered alternate), Miho Gohara, Kimberly Hulst (a), Martha Linscott (a), Jean Bartholomew, Jane Fitzgerald (a), Brenda Corrie-Kuehn (a), Denise Killeen, Deb Jackson (a), Suzy Whaley, Sue Ginter Landry, Laurel Kean, Pat Shriver, Melissa Williams, Smriti Mehra, Chie Furusawa, Catrin Nilsmark, Susan Fasoldt, Sue Curtin (a), Susie Redman, Kris Tschetter, Yuko Kogasaki, Kate Golden

Also qualified (late alternate entrencies)

- Laurie Brower, Laura Coble (a), Joellyn Crocks, Pam Elders, Stephenie Harris (a), Linda Jeffery, Stefani Markovich (a), Shannon Mason (a), Sue Billek Nyhus, Jayne Pardus (a), Ellen Port (a), Sara Sanders, Kim Shek (a)

== Round summaries ==
=== First round ===
Thursday, August 20, 2025

Place	Player	Score	To par
1	(Sweden) Annika Sörenstam	68	−4
T2	(United States) Jackie Gallagher-Smith	69	−3
T2	(United States) Cathy Johnston-Forbes	69	−3
T2	(United States) Michele Redman	69	−3
5	(United States) Juli Inkster	70	−2
T6	(United States) Nicole Jeray	71	−1
T6	(United States) Christy Longfield	71	−1
T6	(Wales) Becky Morgan	71	−1
T6	(Australia) Karrie Webb	71	−1

=== Second round ===
Friday, August 21, 2026

52 players, 46 professionals and six amateurs, made the 36-hole-cut at 10 over par. The oldest player in the field, 73-year-old Barb Moxness, made the cut, with a seven-shot-margin, after shooting har age, with 1-over-par-score of 73 in the first round and adding a score one shot worse in the second round.

Place	Player	Score	To par
1	(United States) Michele Redman	69-68=137	−7
T2	(Wales) Becky Morgan	71-69=140	−4
T2	(Sweden) Annika Sörenstam	68-72=140	−4
T2	(Australia) Karrie Webb	71-69=140	−4
5	(United States) Jackie Gallagher-Smith	69-72=141	−3
6	(Scotland) Catriona Matthew	72-70=142	−2
T7	(United States) Cathy Johnston-Forbes	69-74=143	−1
T7	(Sweden) Maria McBride	73-70=143	−1
T7	(Sweden) Catrin Nilsmark	72-71=143	−1
T10	(United States) Juli Inkster	70-75=145	+1
T10	(United States) Christy Longfield	71-74=145	+1

=== Third round ===
Saturday, August 22, 2026

Place	Player	Score	To par
1	(Sweden) Maria McBride	73-70-66=209	−7
T2	(Wales) Becky Morgan	71-69-73=213	−3
T2	(Sweden) Annika Sörenstam	68-72-73=213	−3
4	(Scotland) Catriona Matthew	72-70-72=214	−2
T5	(United States) Jackie Gallagher-Smith	69-72-75=216	E
T5	(France) Patricia Meunier-Lebouc	73-75-68=216	E
T5	(United States) Michele Redman	69-68-79=216	E
8	(Australia) Karrie Webb	71-69-77=217	+1
9	(Sweden) Catrin Nilsmark	72-71-76=219	+3

=== Final round ===
Sunday, August 23, 2026

With two birdies and an eagle in the final round, Maria McBride held her lead from the third round and won the championship. Runner-up Annika Sörenstam birdied the 17th hole when McBride made bogey, but with both players making par on the last hole McBride still won with two shots. With the win, she completed the "senior slam" winning both of the two senior women's major championships in the same year, the U.S. Senior Women's Open and the LPGA Legends Championship. Defending champion Becky Morgan finished tied seventh. Xiaolong Zhong, China, finished best amateur in 17th place.

Place	Player	Score	To par	Prize money ($)
1	(Sweden) Maria McBride	73-70-66-73=282	−6	200,000
2	(Sweden) Annika Sörenstam	68-72-73-71=284	−4	108,000
3	(Australia) Karrie Webb	71-69-77-70=287	−1	67,042
4	(Scotland) Catriona Matthew	72-70-72-74=288	E	46,708
5	(France) Patricia Meunier-Lebouc	73-75-68-73=289	+1	38,760
6	(United States) Jackie Gallagher-Smith	69-72-75-74=290	+2	34,344
T7	(United States) Laura Diaz	76-74-70-72=292	+4	28,064
T7	(Wales) Becky Morgan	71-69-73-79=292	+4	28,064
T7	(Sweden) Charlotta Sörenstam	72-76-75-69=292	+4	28,064
10	(United States) Leta Lindley	73-77-71-72=293	+5	23,059
