= 1999 LPGA Tour =

Golf tour season

1999 LPGA Tour season
- Duration: January 15, 1999 – November 14, 1999
- Number of official events: 38
- Most wins: 6 (Australia) Karrie Webb
- Money leader: (Australia) Karrie Webb
- Rolex Player of the Year: (Australia) Karrie Webb
- Vare Trophy: (Australia) Karrie Webb
- Rookie of the Year: (South Korea) Mi-Hyun Kim

The 1999 LPGA Tour was the 50th season since the LPGA Tour officially began in 1950. The season ran from January 15 to November 14. The season consisted of 38 official money events. Karrie Webb won the most tournaments, six. She also led the money list with earnings of $1,591,959, setting the LPGA Tour record. She also won the Vare Trophy for lowest scoring average (69.43), besting the previous record (Annika Sörenstam, 1998, 69.99) by more than 0.5 strokes.

The season saw the first tournament with a winner's share of over $300,000, the U.S. Women's Open. There were seven first-time winners in 1999: Akiko Fukushima, Jackie Gallagher-Smith, Maria Hjorth, Mi Hyun Kim, Kelli Kuehne, Mardi Lunn, and Catrin Nilsmark.

The Jamie Farr Kroger Classic saw the first ever six-way playoff in LPGA Tour history. It was won by Se Ri Pak.

The tournament results and award winners are listed below.

== Tournament results ==
The following table shows all the official money events for the 1999 season. "Date" is the ending date of the tournament. The numbers in parentheses after the winners' names are the number of wins they had on the tour up to and including that event. Majors are shown in bold.

Date	Tournament	Location	Winner	Score	Purse ($)	1st prize ($)
Jan 17	HealthSouth Inaugural	Florida	(United States) Kelly Robbins (9)	205 (−11)	550,000	82,500
Jan 24	Naples LPGA Memorial	Florida	(United States) Meg Mallon (10)	272 (−16)	750,000	112,500
Jan 30	The Office Depot	Florida	(Australia) Karrie Webb (11)	278 (−10)	675,000	101,250
Feb 14	Valley of the Stars Championship	California	(Sweden) Catrin Nilsmark (1)	204 (−12)	650,000	97,500
Feb 20	Sunrise Hawaiian Ladies Open	Hawaii	(England) Alison Nicholas (4)	209 (−7)	650,000	97,500
Feb 28	Australian Ladies Masters	Australia	(Australia) Karrie Webb (12)	262 (−26)	750,000	112,500
Mar 14	Welch's/Circle K Championship	Arizona	(United States) Juli Inkster (18)	273 (−15)	625,000	93,750
Mar 21	Standard Register PING	Arizona	(Australia) Karrie Webb (13)	274 (−14)	850,000	127,500
Mar 28	**Nabisco Dinah Shore**	California	(United States) **Dottie Pepper (15)**	269 (−19)	1,000,000	150,000
Apr 4	Longs Drugs Challenge	California	(United States) Juli Inkster (19)	280 (−8)	600,000	90,000
Apr 25	Chick-fil-A Charity Championship	Georgia	(Australia) Rachel Hetherington (2)	204 (−12)	800,000	120,000
May 2	City of Hope Myrtle Beach Classic	South Carolina	(Australia) Rachel Hetherington (3)	137 (−7)^	675,000	101,250
May 9	Mercury Titleholders Championship	Florida	(Australia) Karrie Webb (14)	271 (−17)	900,000	135,000
May 16	Sara Lee Classic	Tennessee	(United States) Meg Mallon (11)	199 (−17)	750,000	112,500
May 23	The Philips Invitational	Texas	(Japan) Akiko Fukushima (1)	267 (−13)	800,000	120,000
May 30	LPGA Corning Classic	New York	(United States) Kelli Kuehne (1)	278 (−10)	750,000	112,500
Jun 6	**U.S. Women's Open**	Mississippi	(United States) **Juli Inkster (20)**	272 (−16)	1,750,000	315,000
Jun 13	Wegmans Rochester International	New York	(Australia) Karrie Webb (15)	280 (−8)	1,000,000	150,000
Jun 20	ShopRite LPGA Classic	New Jersey	(South Korea) Se Ri Pak (5)	198 (−15)	1,000,000	150,000
Jun 27	**McDonald's LPGA Championship**	Delaware	(United States) **Juli Inkster (21)**	268 (−16)	1,400,000	210,000
Jul 4	Jamie Farr Kroger Classic	Ohio	(South Korea) Se Ri Pak (6)	276 (−8)	900,000	135,000
Jul 11	Michelob Light Classic	Missouri	(Sweden) Annika Sörenstam (17)	278 (−10)	800,000	120,000
Jul 18	Japan Airlines Big Apple Classic	New York	(United States) Sherri Steinhauer (4)	273 (−11)	850,000	127,500
Jul 25	Giant Eagle LPGA Classic	Ohio	(United States) Jackie Gallagher-Smith (1)	199 (−17)	1,000,000	150,000
Aug 1	**du Maurier Classic**	Canada	(Australia) **Karrie Webb (16)**	277 (−11)	1,200,000	180,000
Aug 8	areaWEB.COM Challenge	Massachusetts	(Australia) Mardi Lunn (1)	275 (−13)	800,000	120,000
Aug 15	Weetabix Women's British Open	England	(United States) Sherri Steinhauer (5)	283 (−9)	1,000,000	160,000
Aug 22	Firstar LPGA Classic	Ohio	(United States) Rosie Jones (10)	207 (−9)	650,000	97,500
Aug 29	Oldsmobile Classic	Michigan	(United States) Dottie Pepper (16)	270 (−18)	700,000	105,000
Sep 6	State Farm Rail Classic	Illinois	(South Korea) Mi Hyun Kim (1)	204 (−12)	775,000	116,250
Sep 12	Samsung World Championship of Women's Golf	Minnesota	(South Korea) Se Ri Pak (7)	280 (−8)	700,000	150,000
Sep 19	Safeco Classic	Washington	(Sweden) Maria Hjorth (1)	271 (−17)	650,000	97,500
Sep 26	Safeway LPGA Golf Championship	Oregon	(United States) Juli Inkster (22)	207 (−9)	800,000	120,000
Oct 3	New Albany Golf Classic	Ohio	(Sweden) Annika Sörenstam (18)	269 (−19)	1,000,000	150,000
Oct 10	First Union Betsy King Classic	Pennsylvania	(South Korea) Mi Hyun Kim (2)	280 (−8)	725,000	108,750
Oct 17	AFLAC Champions	Alabama	(Japan) Akiko Fukushima (2)	279 (−9)	750,000	122,000
Nov 7	Mizuno Classic	Japan	(Sweden) Maria Hjorth (2)	201 (−15)	800,000	120,000
Nov 14	PageNet Championship	Nevada	(South Korea) Se Ri Pak (8)	276 (−12)	1,000,000	215,000

^ – weather-shortened tournament

== Awards ==
Award	Winner	Country
Money winner	Karrie Webb (2)	Australia
Scoring leader (Vare Trophy)	Karrie Webb (2)	Australia
Player of the Year	Karrie Webb	Australia
Rookie of the Year	Mi Hyun Kim	South Korea
