= 1999 LPGA Championship =

Tournament information
- Dates: June 24–27, 1999
- Location: Wilmington, Delaware; 39.789°N 75.564°W
- Course: DuPont Country Club
- Tour: LPGA Tour
- Format: Stroke play - 72 holes

Statistics
- Par: 71
- Length: 6,376 yards (5,830 m)
- Field: 139 players, 71 after cut
- Cut: 143 (+1)
- Prize fund: $1.4 million
- Winner's share: $210,000

Champion
- (United States) Juli Inkster
- 268 (−16)
- Location in United States Location in Delaware

The 1999 LPGA Championship was the 45th LPGA Championship, played June 24–27 at DuPont Country Club in Wilmington, Delaware. This was the third of four major championships that took place on the LPGA Tour in 1999.

Three days after turning 39, Juli Inkster shot a final round 65 to win her first LPGA Championship, four strokes ahead of runner-up Liselotte Neumann and completed the career grand slam. The fifth of her seven major titles, it was also consecutive major victories; she won her first U.S. Women's Open title three weeks earlier. Inkster successfully defended this LPGA Championship the following year.

The DuPont Country Club hosted this championship for 11 consecutive seasons, from 1994 through 2004.

== Final leaderboard ==
Sunday, June 27, 1999

Place	Player	Score	To par	Money ($)
1	(United States) Juli Inkster	68-66-69-65=268	−16	210,000
2	(Sweden) Liselotte Neumann	67-67-70-68=272	−12	130,330
T3	(Australia) Mardi Lunn	68-74-65-66=273	−11	84,538
T3	(United States) Nancy Scranton	69-68-66-70=273	−11	84,538
T5	(United States) Rosie Jones	64-72-68-70=274	−10	54,596
T5	(United States) Cristie Kerr	70-64-69-71=274	−10	54,596
T7	(England) Laura Davies	65-71-71-68=275	−9	35,224
T7	(United States) Emilee Klein	72-68-67-68=275	−9	35,224
T7	(United States) Jill McGill	70-69-68-68=275	−9	35,224
T7	(South Korea) Se Ri Pak	68-69-67-71=275	−9	35,224
