= Shani Waugh =

Australian professional golfer (born 1969)

Personal information
- Nationality: Australia
- Born: 2 September 1969 (age 57) Bunbury, Western Australia, Australia
- Height: 173 cm (5 ft 8 in)
- Children: 1

Career
- Sport: Golf
- Turned professional: 1991
- Former tours: LPGA Tour (joined 1997); Ladies European Tour (joined 1991); ALPG Tour (joined 1991)
- Professional wins: 7

Number of wins by tour
- Ladies European Tour: 3
- WPGA Tour of Australasia: 4

Best results in LPGA major championships
- Chevron Championship: T64: 2003
- Women's PGA C'ship: T39: 1999
- U.S. Women's Open: 3rd: 2002
- du Maurier Classic: T34: 1998, 1999

Shani Waugh (born 2 September 1969) is an Australian professional golfer. She played on the U.S.-based LPGA Tour and Ladies European Tour, as well as on the ALPG Tour in her home country.

Waugh turned professional in 1991 and joined the Ladies European Tour the same year. In 1997 she joined the LPGA Tour, where career highlights include finishing runner-up at the 2003 Chick-fil-A Charity Championship after a playoff with Se Ri Pak, and finishing third at the 2002 U.S. Women's Open behind Juli Inkster and Annika Sörenstam.

Waugh won three times on the LET between 1996 and 2005. After her inaugural win at Costa Azul Ladies Open, she beat Becky Brewerton into second place at the Wales WPGA Championship of Europe by holing a 74-foot birdie putt on the final green and beat Gwladys Nocera in a playoff to win Thailand Ladies Open.

== Professional wins (7) ==
=== Ladies European Tour wins (3) ===
No.	Date	Tournament	Winning score	Margin of victory	Runner(s)-up
1	11 May 1996	Costa Azul Ladies Open	−2 (214)	2 strokes	(France) Marie-Laure de Lorenzi, (Philippines) Mary Grace Estuesta, (Sweden) Helene Koch, (Republic of Ireland) Aideen Rogers
2	25 Aug 2003	Wales WPGA Championship of Europe	−7 (73-71-73-69=286)	2 strokes	(Wales) Becky Brewerton
3	3 Apr 2005	Thailand Ladies Open	−6 (67-71-71-73=282)	Playoff	(France) Gwladys Nocera

Ladies European Tour playoff record (1–2)

No.	Year	Tournament	Opponent	Result
1	2005	Thailand Ladies Open	(France) Gwladys Nocera	Won with par on first extra hole

=== ALPG Tour wins (4) ===
- 2005 (1) Peugeot Kangaroo Valley Resort Pro-Am
- 2007 (2) Angostura Lemon Lime & Bitters Castle Hill Country Club Pro-Am, Mollymook Women's Classic
- 2008 (1) Peter Donnelly Ladies Classic

== Playoff record ==
LPGA Tour playoff record (0–1)

No.	Year	Tournament	Opponent(s)	Result
1	2003	Chick-fil-A Charity Championship	(South Korea) Se Ri Pak	Lost to par on fourth extra hole

== Team appearances ==
Professional

- Praia d'El Rey European Cup (representing Ladies European Tour): 1997
