= 2002 U.S. Women's Open =

Coordinates: 38.091°N 97.848°W

Tournament information
- Dates: July 4–7, 2002
- Location: Hutchinson, Kansas
- Course: Prairie Dunes Country Club
- Organized by: USGA
- Tour: LPGA Tour

Statistics
- Par: 70
- Length: 6,267 yards (5,731 m)
- Field: 156 players, 69 after cut
- Cut: 149 (+9)
- Prize fund: $3.0 million
- Winner's share: $535,000

Champion
- (United States) Juli Inkster
- 276 (−4)

Location in the United States
Location in Kansas

The 2002 U.S. Women's Open was the 57th U.S. Women's Open, held July 4–7 in Kansas at Prairie Dunes Country Club, northeast of Hutchinson, about forty miles (64 km) northwest of Wichita.

Juli Inkster won her second U.S. Women's Open, two strokes ahead of runner-up Annika Sörenstam, the 54-hole leader. Inkster, 42, shot a final round 66 (−4) to gain her seventh and final major title. She joined Babe Zaharias as the only women to win two majors after age 40.

This was the first purse of $3 million at the U.S. Women's Open, it had tripled in the seven years since 1995, the first seven-figure purse.

== Course layout ==
Hole	1	2	3	4	5	6	7	8	9	Out	10	11	12	13	14	15	16	17	18	In	Total
Yards	401	142	321	157	405	372	512	412	399	3,121	160	437	363	387	342	175	400	500	382	3,146	6,267
Par	4	3	4	3	4	4	5	4	4	35	3	4	4	4	4	3	4	5	4	35	70

== Round summaries ==
=== First round ===
Thursday, July 4, 2002

Place	Player	Score	To par
T1	(United States) Laura Diaz	67	−3
T1	(United States) Juli Inkster	67	−3
T1	(Australia) Shani Waugh	67	−3
4	(United States) Kim Saiki	68	−2
T5	(Canada) Lorie Kane	69	−1
T5	(Scotland) Catriona Matthew	69	−1
T7	(United States) Audra Burks	70	E
T7	(United States) Brandie Burton	70	E
T7	(United States) Jackie Gallagher-Smith	70	E
T7	(United States) Pamela Kerrigan	70	E
T7	(United States) Kelli Kuehne	70	E
T7	(Scotland) Mhairi McKay	70	E
T7	(United States) Cindy Schreyer	70	E
T7	(Sweden) Annika Sörenstam	70	E
T7	(United States) Sherri Steinhauer	70	E

=== Second round ===
Friday, July 5, 2002

Place	Player	Score	To par
T1	(United States) Laura Diaz	67-72=139	−1
T1	(United States) Juli Inkster	67-72=139	−1
T1	(Sweden) Annika Sörenstam	70-69=139	−1
T4	(United States) Michele Redman	71-69=140	E
T4	(Australia) Shani Waugh	67-73=140	E
6	(United States) Jill McGill	71-70=141	+1
T7	(United States) Jenna Daniels	72-70=142	+2
T7	(Australia) Michelle Ellis	71-71=142	+2
T9	(United States) Stephanie Keever	72-71=143	+3
T9	(Scotland) Janice Moodie	71-72=143	+3
T9	(Sweden) Charlotta Sörenstam	73-70=143	+3

=== Third round ===
Saturday, July 6, 2002

Place	Player	Score	To par
1	(Sweden) Annika Sörenstam	70-69-69=208	−2
T2	(United States) Juli Inkster	67-72-71=210	E
T2	(United States) Jill McGill	71-70-69=210	E
4	(Australia) Shani Waugh	67-73-71=211	+1
5	(United States) Michele Redman	71-69-73=213	+3
6	(Scotland) Janice Moodie	71-72-71=214	+4
T7	(New Zealand) Lynnette Brooky	73-73-69=215	+5
T7	(Canada) Lorie Kane	69-77-69=215	+5
T7	(Sweden) Carin Koch	73-72-70=215	+5
T10	(England) Laura Davies	75-73-68=216	+6
T10	(United States) Laura Diaz	67-72-77=216	+6
T10	(United States) Susan Ginter-Brooker	74-72-70=216	+6
T10	(United States) Stephanie Keever	72-71-73=216	+6
T10	(South Korea) Mi-Hyun Kim	74-72-70=216	+6
T10	(Scotland) Mhairi McKay	70-75-71=216	+6
T10	(Sweden) Liselotte Neumann	72-74-70=216	+6

=== Final round ===
Sunday, July 7, 2002

Place	Player	Score	To par	Money ($)
1	(United States) Juli Inkster	67-72-71-66=276	−4	535,000
2	(Sweden) Annika Sörenstam	70-69-69-70=278	−2	315,000
3	(Australia) Shani Waugh	67-73-71-72=283	+3	202,568
4	(Spain) Raquel Carriedo	75-71-72-66=284	+4	141,219
5	(South Korea) Se Ri Pak	74-75-68-68=285	+5	114,370
6	(Scotland) Mhairi McKay	70-75-71-70=286	+6	101,421
T7	(United States) Beth Daniel	71-76-71-69=287	+7	78,015
T7	(Scotland) Janice Moodie	71-72-71-73=287	+7	78,015
T7	(Philippines) Jennifer Rosales	73-72-74-68=287	+7	78,015
T7	(United States) Kelli Kuehne	70-76-72-69=287	+7	78,015
T7	(United States) Laura Diaz	67-72-77-71=287	+7	78,015

==== Scorecard ====
Hole	1	2	3	4	5	6	7	8	9	10	11	12	13	14	15	16	17	18
Par	4	3	4	3	4	4	5	4	4	3	4	4	4	4	3	4	5	4
(United States) Inkster	E	−1	−1	−1	−1	−2	−3	−3	−3	−3	−4	−4	−4	−4	−4	−5	−4	−4
(Sweden) Sörenstam	−2	−2	−2	−2	−2	−2	−3	−2	−2	−2	−2	−2	−2	−3	−2	−1	−2	−2
(Australia) Waugh	+1	+1	+1	+1	+1	+1	E	+1	+3	+3	+2	+3	+2	+2	+2	+3	+3	+3
(Spain) Carriedo	+7	+6	+5	+5	+4	+4	+3	+3	+3	+3	+3	+3	+4	+4	+4	+4	+4	+4
(South Korea) Pak	+6	+6	+6	+6	+6	+5	+6	+7	+7	+7	+7	+7	+7	+6	+6	+6	+5	+5
(Scotland) McKay	+6	+6	+6	+6	+6	+6	+5	+6	+7	+6	+5	+6	+6	+6	+6	+7	+6	+6
(Scotland) Moodie	+4	+5	+4	+6	+6	+5	+4	+4	+4	+5	+5	+4	+5	+5	+5	+6	+6	+7
(United States) McGill	+1	+2	+2	+2	+2	+2	+1	+1	+1	+2	+2	+3	+3	+3	+3	+6	+8	+8

Cumulative tournament scores, relative to par

Birdie	Bogey	Double bogey	Triple bogey+
