= 1992 du Maurier Classic =

Coordinates: 49.8660°N 97.2832°W

The 1992 du Maurier Classic was contested from August 13–16 at St. Charles Country Club. It was the 20th edition of the du Maurier Classic, and the 14th edition as a major championship on the LPGA Tour.

This event was won by Sherri Steinhauer.

== Final leaderboard ==
Place	Player	Score	To par	Money (US$)
1	(United States) Sherri Steinhauer	67-73-67-70=277	−11	105,000
2	(United States) Judy Dickinson	70-71-67-71=279	−9	65,165
3	(United States) Juli Inkster	70-69-73-68=280	−8	47,553
4	(United States) Ellie Gibson	71-73-74-65=283	−5	36,985
5	(United States) Shelley Hamlin	74-68-75-67=284	−4	29,940
T6	(United States) Kristi Albers	70-68-75-72=285	−3	17,269
T6	(United States) Donna Andrews	73-69-72-71=285	−3	17,269
T6	(United States) Tina Barrett	74-71-70-70=285	−3	17,269
T6	(Belgium) Florence Descampe	71-71-70-73=285	−3	17,269
T6	(United States) Tammie Green	70-71-70-74=285	−3	17,269
T6	(United States) Caroline Keggi	73-71-68-73=285	−3	17,269
T6	(United States) Barb Mucha	71-71-72-71=285	−3	17,269
