= 2000 LPGA Championship =

Tournament information
- Dates: June 22–25, 2000
- Location: Wilmington, Delaware; 39.789°N 75.564°W
- Course: DuPont Country Club
- Tour: LPGA Tour
- Format: Stroke play - 72 holes

Statistics
- Par: 71
- Length: 6,408 yards (5,859 m)
- Field: 144 players, 73 after cut
- Cut: 147 (+5)
- Prize fund: $1.4 million
- Winner's share: $210,000

Champion
- (United States) Juli Inkster
- 281 (−3), playoff
- Location in United States Location in Delaware

The 2000 LPGA Championship was the 46th LPGA Championship, played June 22–25 at DuPont Country Club in Wilmington, Delaware. This was the second of four major championships on the LPGA Tour in 2000.

Defending champion Juli Inkster won her second consecutive LPGA Championship on the second hole of a sudden-death playoff with Stefania Croce, and became the first to successfully defend the title since 1984.

On Saturday, her 40th birthday, Inkster was the 54-hole co-leader with Wendy Ward after a 65 (−6). On a blustery Sunday, she had a three-shot lead with five holes to play, but made a double bogey on 14 and missed a six-foot (1.8 m) par putt on the final hole for 75. In the sudden-death playoff, Inkster parred both holes to win the sixth of her seven major titles.

The DuPont Country Club hosted this championship for eleven consecutive seasons, from 1994 through 2004.

== Final leaderboard ==
Sunday, June 25, 2000

Place	Player	Score	To par	Money ($)
T1	(United States) Juli Inkster	72-69-65-75=281	−3	Playoff
T1	(Italy) Stefania Croce	72-67-74-68=281	−3	Playoff
T3	(South Korea) Se Ri Pak	73-69-69-71=282	−2	76,319
T3	(United States) Nancy Scranton	72-70-67-73=282	−2	76,319
T3	(United States) Wendy Ward	69-69-68-76=282	−2	76,319
T6	(United States) Heather Bowie	74-70-70-69=283	−1	42,503
T6	(Australia) Jane Crafter	72-69-69-73=283	−1	42,503
T6	(England) Laura Davies	70-66-75-72=283	−1	42,503
T9	(Japan) Akiko Fukushima	71-72-71-70=284	E	29,839
T9	(Australia) Jan Stephenson	70-69-69-76=284	E	29,839
T9	(Australia) Karrie Webb	72-70-69-73=284	E	29,839

=== Playoff ===
Place	Player	Score	To par	Money ($)
1	(United States) Juli Inkster	4-4=8	E	210,000
2	(Italy) Stefania Croce	4-5=9	+1	130,330

- Sudden-death playoff played on holes 18 and 10.
