= George W. Bryan =

- Born: April 5, 1944; West Point, Mississippi, U.S.
- Died: January 6, 2023 (aged 78)
- Education: Mississippi State University
- Occupations: Founder and CEO, Old Waverly Properties, LLC
- Spouse: Marcia Lavender Bryan
- Children: Wilkes Bryan; Laura Williams; Suzanne Sampietro; Nancy Campbell
- Parent(s): John H. Bryan, Sr. Catherine Bryan
- Website: Old Waverly

George W. Bryan (April 5, 1944 – January 6, 2023) was an American businessman who was Chief Executive Officer of Sara Lee Foods, Senior VP of Sara Lee Corporation, and founder of Old Waverly Golf Club.

== Biography ==
Bryan was born in West Point, Mississippi on April 5, 1944. He graduated from West Point High School, where he then attended Mississippi State University in nearby Starkville. Bryan completed his undergraduate degree in 1968 with a degree in Business Administration. He died on the morning of January 6, 2023, at the age of 78.

=== Bryan Foods ===
After graduation Bryan began working for Bryan Foods, his family's meat products manufacturing business based in West Point. Shortly after he began working, Bryan Foods was acquired by Sara Lee Corporation. After working in cost accounting, he became production manager and vice president of sales before being named president of Bryan Foods in 1974.

=== Sara Lee Corporation ===
Bryan further advanced to the role of Senior Vice President of Sara Lee Corporation in 1983 and moved to the company's meat group offices in West Tennessee. Under Bryan's guidance Sara Lee's meat division produced more than $3.5 billion in annual sales. He continued working until retirement as Senior Vice President of Sara Lee Corporation and CEO of Sara Lee Foods.

=== Old Waverly Golf Club ===
In 1988, George, his wife Marcia, and 29 founding members opened Old Waverly Golf Club. The course was designed by Jerry Pate and Bob Cupp. Old Waverly was well received throughout the country, being named a Top New Course in the United States by Golf Digest. Old Waverly continued to garner national acclaim until Bryan sought to host a major tournament. Old Waverly hosted the 1999 U.S. Women's Open to nearly 130,000 attendees. The attendance is still the second highest in the history of the U.S. Women's Open. The tournament is considered the most prestigious sporting event hosted in the state of Mississippi.

Old Waverly has regularly been named the top golf course in Mississippi and a Top 100 course in the United States by Golf Digest, Golfweek, and other publications.

=== Other endeavors ===
Bryan has served in various advisory roles on the Board of Directors of numerous organizations, including:

- Regions Financial Corporation
- American Meat Institute
- Union Planters National Bank, Memphis, Tennessee
- Danek Group, Memphis, Tennessee
- Mississippi State University Development Foundation
- Buckeye Technologies, Inc., Memphis, Tennessee

In addition, Bryan has developed residential and commercial real estate in Mississippi, Tennessee and Utah.

== Awards and recognition ==
- Outstanding Mississippian, Gov. Cliff Finch (1979)
- College of Business and Industry Alumni Fellow, Mississippi State University (1992)
- West Point Hall of Fame (1992)
- Mississippi Sports Person of the Year, The Clarion-Ledger (1999)
- National Alumnus of the Year, Mississippi State University (2000)
- West Point Citizen of the Year (2000)
- Spirit of 1776 Award, Liberty Bowl (2013)
- Rube Award, Mississippi Sports Hall of Fame (2015)
- Distinguished Service Award, Mississippi Golf Association (2015)
