= 1989 Nabisco Dinah Shore =

Coordinates: 33.798°N 116.433°W

Tournament information
- Dates: March 30 – April 2, 1989
- Location: Rancho Mirage, California
- Courses: Mission Hills Country Club; Old Course (Dinah Shore Tourn. Course)
- Tour: LPGA Tour
- Format: Stroke play – 72 holes

Statistics
- Par: 72
- Length: 6,441 yards (5,890 m)
- Cut: 151 (+7)
- Prize fund: $500,000
- Winner's share: $80,000

Champion
- (United States) Juli Inkster
- 279 (−9)

Location in the United States
Location in California

The 1989 Nabisco Dinah Shore was a women's professional golf tournament, held March 30 to April 2 at Mission Hills Country Club in Rancho Mirage, California. This was the 18th edition of the Nabisco Dinah Shore, and the seventh as a major championship.

Juli Inkster won the second of her two Dinah Shores, five strokes ahead of runners-up JoAnne Carner and Tammie Green. She led wire-to-wire and entered the final round with a five-stroke lead. It was the third of Inkster's seven major titles, although the fourth came over a decade later.

== Final leaderboard ==
Sunday, April 2, 1989

Place	Player	Score	To par	Money ($)
1	(United States) Juli Inkster	66-69-73-71=279	−9	80,000
T2	(United States) JoAnne Carner	71-71-71-71=284	−4	34,000
T2	(United States) Tammie Green	72-68-75-69=284	−4	34,000
T4	(United States) Jody Rosenthal	69-72-72-74=287	−1	19,750
T4	(United States) Betsy King	73-75-68-71=287	−1	19,750
T6	(United States) Amy Benz	74-74-71-69=288	E	12,511
T6	(United States) Pat Bradley	70-75-75-68=288	E	12,511
T6	(United States) Janet Coles	72-70-73-73=288	E	12,511
T6	(United States) Beth Daniel	69-70-76-73=288	E	12,511
T6	(United States) Cathy Morse	72-72-73-71=288	E	12,511
