= 1998 Solheim Cup =

Women's team golf competition

- Dates: September 18–20, 1998
- Venue: Muirfield Village
- Location: Dublin, Ohio
- Captains: Judy Rankin (USA); Pia Nilsson (Europe)
(United States)	16	12	(Europe)
- United States wins the Solheim Cup

Location map
- Location within the United States Location within Ohio

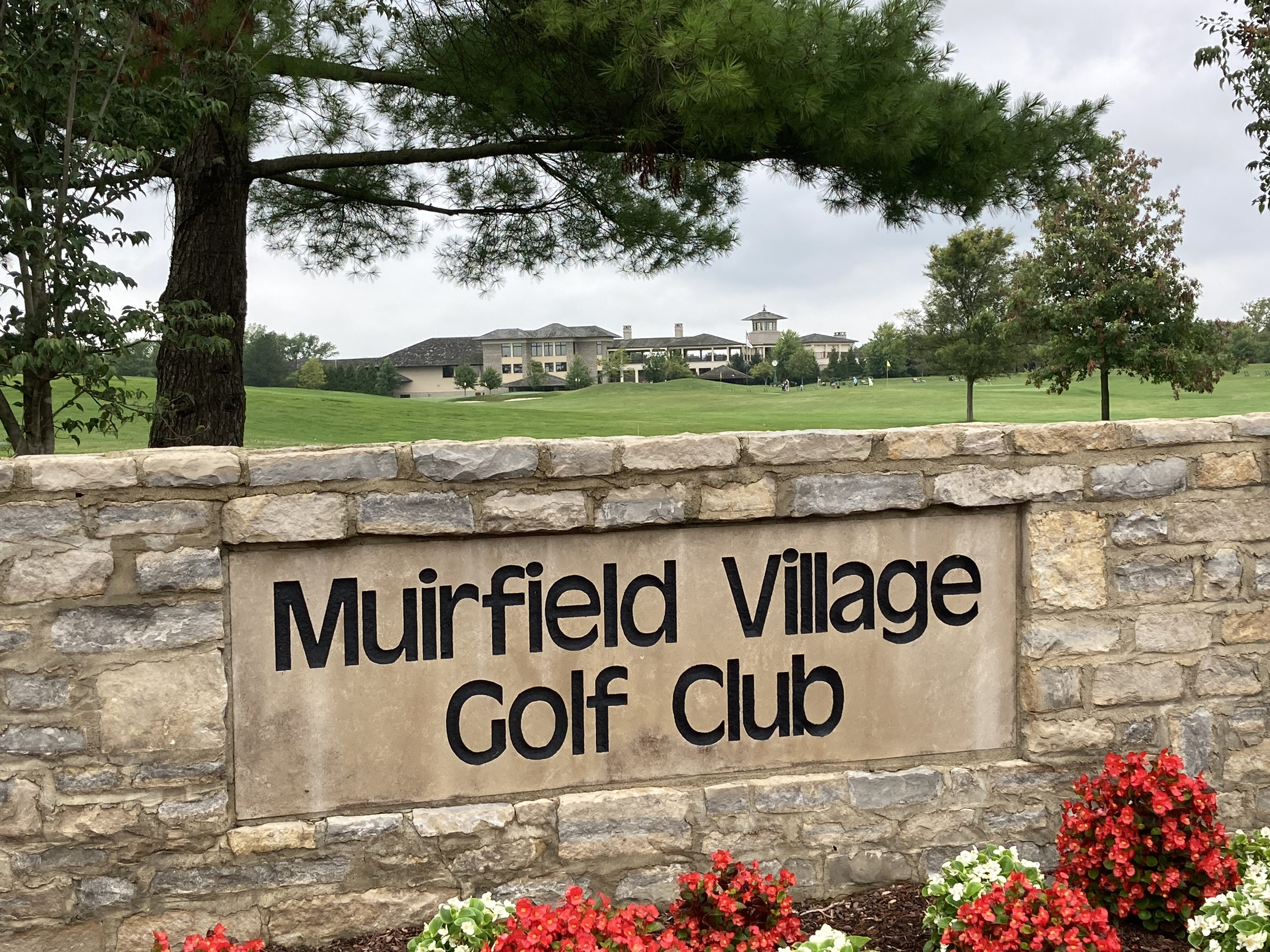
Muirfield Village Golf Club

The fifth Solheim Cup took place from September 18 to September 20, 1998, at Muirfield Village, Dublin, Ohio, United States. The United States team retained the cup beating the European team by 16 points to 12.

== Teams ==
Europe

- Captain
  - Pia Nilsson – Sweden
- Automatic qualifiers
  - Helen Alfredsson – Gothenburg, Sweden
  - Laura Davies – Coventry, England
  - Marie-Laure de Lorenzi – Biarritz, France
  - (England) Alison Nicholas – Gibraltar
  - Trish Johnson – Bristol, England
  - Catriona Matthew – North Berwick, Scotland
  - Annika Sörenstam – Stockholm, Sweden
- Captains Picks
  - Sophie Gustafson – Särö, Sweden
  - Lisa Hackney – England
  - Liselotte Neumann – Finspang, Sweden
  - Catrin Nilsmark – Gothenburg, Sweden
  - Charlotta Sörenstam – Stockholm, Sweden

United States

- Captain
  - Judy Rankin – St Louis, Missouri
- Automatic qualifiers
  - Donna Andrews – Lynchburg, Virginia
  - Brandie Burton – San Bernardino, California
  - Tammie Green – Somerset, Ohio
  - Pat Hurst – San Leandro, California
  - Juli Inkster – Santa Cruz, California
  - Christa Johnson – Arcata, California
  - Kelly Robbins – Mt. Pleasant, Michigan
  - Betsy King – Reading, Pennsylvania
  - Meg Mallon – Natick, Massachusetts
  - Dottie Pepper – Saratoga Springs, New York
- Captains Picks
  - Rosie Jones – Santa Ana, California
  - Sherri Steinhauer – Madison, Wisconsin

== Format ==
A total of 28 points were available, divided among four periods of team play, followed by one period of singles play. The first period, on Friday morning, was four rounds of foursomes. This was followed in the afternoon by four rounds of fourballs. This schedule was repeated on the Saturday morning and afternoon. The four periods on Friday and Saturday accounted for 16 points. During these team periods, the players played in teams of two. The final 12 points were decided in a round of singles matchplay, in which all 24 players (12 from each team) took part.

== Day one ==
Friday, September 18, 1998

=== Morning foursomes ===
	Results
Davies/Johnson	(United States) 3 & 1	Pepper/Inkster
Alfredsson/Nicholas	(United States) 3 & 1	Mallon/Burton
Hackney/Neumann	(United States) 1 up	Robbins/Hurst
A. Sörenstam/Matthew	(Europe) 3 & 2	Andrews/Green
1	Session	3
1	Overall	3

=== Afternoon fourball ===
	Results
C. Sörenstam/Davies	halved	King/Johnson
Hackney/Gustafson	(United States) 7 & 5	Hurst/Jones
Alfredsson/de Lorenzi	(Europe) 2 & 1	Robbins/Steinhauer
A. Sörenstam/Nilsmark	(United States) 2 up	Pepper/Burton
1 1/2	Session	2 1/2
2 1/2	Overall	5 1/2

== Day two ==
Saturday, September 19, 1998

=== Morning foursomes ===
	Results
A. Sörenstam/Matthew	(United States) 3 & 2	Andrews/Steinhauer
C. Sörenstam/Davies	(Europe) 3 & 2	Mallon/Burton
Alfredsson/de Lorenzi	(United States) 1 up	Pepper/Inkster
Neumann/Nilsmark	(United States) 1 up	Robbins/Hurst
1	Session	3
3 1/2	Overall	8 1/2

=== Afternoon fourball ===
	Results
A. Sörenstam/Nilsmark	(Europe) 5 & 3	King/Jones
Hackney/Davies	(Europe) 2 up	Johnson/Green
Alfredsson/de Lorenzi	(United States) 4 & 3	Andrews/Steinhauer
Neumann/C. Sörenstam	(United States) 2 & 1	Mallon/Inkster
2	Session	2
5 1/2	Overall	10 1/2

== Day three ==
Sunday, September 20, 1998

=== Singles ===
	Results
Laura Davies	(Europe) 1 up	Pat Hurst
Helen Alfredsson	(Europe) 2 & 1	Juli Inkster
Annika Sörenstam	(Europe) 2 & 1	Donna Andrews
Liselotte Neumann	(Europe) 1 up	Brandie Burton
Trish Johnson	(United States) 3 & 2	Dottie Pepper
Charlotta Sörenstam	(United States) 2 & 1	Kelly Robbins
Marie-Laure de Lorenzi	(Europe) 1 up	Christa Johnson
Catrin Nilsmark	(United States) 6 & 4	Rosie Jones
Alison Nicholas	(United States) 1 up	Tammie Green
Catriona Matthew	(United States) 3 & 2	Sherri Steinhauer
Lisa Hackney	(Europe) 6 & 5	Betsy King
Sophie Gustafson	halved	Meg Mallon
6 1/2	Session	5 1/2
12	Overall	16
