= 2004 LPGA Championship =

Tournament information
- Dates: June 10–13, 2004
- Location: Wilmington, Delaware; 39.789°N 75.564°W
- Course: DuPont Country Club
- Tour: LPGA Tour
- Format: Stroke play - 72 holes

Statistics
- Par: 71
- Length: 6,408 yards (5,859 m)
- Field: 144 players, 79 after cut
- Cut: 146 (+4)
- Prize fund: $1.6 million
- Winner's share: $240,000

Champion
- (Sweden) Annika Sörenstam
- 271 (−17)
- Location in United States Location in Delaware

The 2004 LPGA Championship was the 50th LPGA Championship, played June 10–13 at DuPont Country Club in Wilmington, Delaware.

Defending champion Annika Sörenstam won the second of her three consecutive LPGA championships, three strokes ahead of runner-up Shi Hyun Ahn. Due to heavy rains on Friday, the final 36 holes were played on Sunday. It was the seventh of Sörenstam's ten major titles.

Beginning in 1994, the DuPont Country Club hosted this championship for eleven consecutive seasons, ending with this edition. The next five were played in nearby Maryland, at Bulle Rock Golf Course in Havre de Grace.

== Final leaderboard ==
Sunday, June 13, 2004

Place	Player	Score	To par	Money ($)
1	(Sweden) Annika Sörenstam	68-67-64-72=271	−17	240,000
2	(South Korea) Shi Hyun Ahn	69-70-69-66=274	−14	144,780
3	(South Korea) Grace Park	68-70-70-68=276	−12	105,028
T4	(South Korea) Gloria Park	67-72-68-71=278	−10	73,322
T4	(United States) Angela Stanford	69-71-67-71=278	−10	73,322
T6	(United States) Juli Inkster	70-66-70-73=279	−9	49,145
T6	(United States) Christina Kim	74-69-64-72=279	−9	49,145
T8	(Australia) Wendy Doolan	73-70-65-72=280	−8	35,538
T8	(South Korea) Kang Soo-yun	69-68-71-72=280	−8	35,538
T8	(Mexico) Lorena Ochoa	71-67-67-75=280	−8	35,538
