= 1999 U.S. Women's Open =

Coordinates: 33.575°N 88.608°W

Tournament information
- Dates: June 3–6, 1999
- Location: West Point, Mississippi
- Course: Old Waverly Golf Club
- Organized by: USGA
- Tour: LPGA Tour

Statistics
- Par: 72
- Length: 6,433 yards (5,882 m)
- Field: 150 players, 63 after cut
- Cut: 144 (E)
- Prize fund: $1.75 million
- Winner's share: $315,000

Champion
- (United States) Juli Inkster
- 272 (−16)

Location in the United States
Location in Mississippi

The 1999 U.S. Women's Open was the 54th U.S. Women's Open, held June 3–6 at Old Waverly Golf Club in West Point, Mississippi, northwest of Columbus.

In her twentieth attempt, Juli Inkster won the first of her two U.S. Women's Open titles, five strokes ahead of runner-up Sherri Turner. Inkster, 38, broke the under-par scoring record with a 272 (−16) and became the oldest champion since 1955. It was the fourth of her seven major championships; she also won the next major, the LPGA Championship, three weeks later.

The win was the first by an American at the championship in five years, and Inkster became the first since JoAnne Carner to win the U.S. Women's Amateur and the U.S. Women's Open. Carner won her amateur title in 1968 and Open titles in 1971 and 1976. Inkster won three consecutive amateur titles in 1980, 1981, and 1982; she won her second Open in 2002.

Grace Park set the amateur scoring record at 283 (−5) and turned professional shortly after.

Annika Sörenstam shot 146 (+2) and missed the cut by two strokes, the second and last time she failed to play the weekend in her fifteen appearances. She previously missed the cut in 1997, as the two-time defending champion (1995, 1996). Sörenstam won her third Open in 2006, the last of her ten major titles.

== Course layout ==
Hole	1	2	3	4	5	6	7	8	9	Out	10	11	12	13	14	15	16	17	18	In	Total
Yards	339	475	163	390	403	348	177	413	512	3,220	520	408	151	384	357	447	388	183	375	3,213	6,433
Par	4	5	3	4	4	4	3	4	5	36	5	4	3	4	4	5	4	3	4	36	72

== Round summaries ==
=== First round ===
Thursday, June 3, 1999
Friday, June 4, 1999

Place	Player	Score	To par
1	(United States) Kelli Kuehne	64	−8
2	(United States) Juli Inkster	65	−7
3	(United States) Moira Dunn	67	−5
T4	(South Korea) Se Ri Pak	68	−4
T4	(United States) Dottie Pepper	68	−4
T4	(United States) Sherri Steinhauer	68	−4
T7	(United States) Donna Andrews	69	−3
T7	(Canada) A. J. Eathorne	69	−3
T7	(Japan) Akiko Fukushima	69	−3
T7	(Scotland) Catriona Matthew	69	−3
T7	(Sweden) Catrin Nilsmark	69	−3
T7	(United States) Sherri Turner	69	−3

=== Second round ===
Friday, June 4, 1999

Place	Player	Score	To par
T1	(United States) Juli Inkster	65-69=134	−10
T1	(Canada) Lorie Kane	70-64=134	−10
3	(United States) Kelli Kuehne	64-71=135	−9
4	(United States) Becky Iverson	72-64=136	−8
T5	(Scotland) Catriona Matthew	69-68=137	−7
T5	(South Korea) Grace Park (a)	70-67=137	−7
T5	(United States) Dottie Pepper	68-69=137	−7
T5	(United States) Sherri Steinhauer	68-69=137	−7
T9	(United States) Moira Dunn	67-71=138	−6
T9	(United States) Lisa Riggens	71-67=138	−6
T9	(South Korea) Se Ri Pak	68-70=138	−6
T9	(United States) Sherri Turner	69-69=138	−6

=== Third round ===
Saturday, June 5, 1999

Place	Player	Score	To par
1	(United States) Juli Inkster	65-69-67=201	−15
T2	(Canada) Lorie Kane	70-64-71=205	−11
T2	(United States) Kelli Kuehne	64-71-70=205	−11
4	(United States) Sherri Turner	69-69-68=206	−10
5	(Australia) Karrie Webb	70-70-68=208	−8
T6	(United States) Becky Iverson	72-64-73=209	−7
T6	(Sweden) Carin Koch	72-69-68=209	−7
T6	(United States) Meg Mallon	70-70-69=209	−7
T6	(United States) Dottie Pepper	68-69-72=209	−7
T10	(Sweden) Helen Alfredsson	72-68-70=210	−6
T10	(Japan) Akiko Fukushima	69-70-71=209	−6
T10	(Sweden) Catrin Nilsmark	69-71-70=209	−6
T10	(South Korea) Grace Park (a)	70-67-73=209	−6
T10	(United States) Sherri Steinhauer	68-69-73=209	−6

=== Final round ===
Sunday, June 6, 1999

Place	Player	Score	To par	Money ($)
1	(United States) Juli Inkster	65-69-67-71=272	−16	315,000
2	(United States) Sherri Turner	69-69-68-71=277	−11	185,000
3	(United States) Kelli Kuehne	64-71-70-74=279	−9	118,227
4	(Canada) Lorie Kane	70-64-71-75=280	−8	82,399
T5	(Sweden) Carin Koch	72-69-68-72=281	−7	62,938
T5	(United States) Meg Mallon	70-70-69-72=281	−7	62,938
7	(Australia) Karrie Webb	70-70-68-74=282	−6	53,132
T8	(Scotland) Catriona Matthew	69-68-74-72=283	−5	45,244
T8	(England) Helen Dobson	71-70-73-69=283	−5	45,244
T8	(Sweden) Maria Hjorth	73-69-70-71=283	−5	45,244
T8	(South Korea) Grace Park (a)	70-67-73-73=283	−5	0
