= 1984 du Maurier Classic =

Coordinates: 43.675°N 79.531°W

The 1984 du Maurier Classic was contested from July 26–29 at St. George's Golf and Country Club. It was the 12th edition of the du Maurier Classic, and the sixth edition as a major championship on the LPGA Tour.

This event was won by Juli Inkster.

== Final leaderboard ==
Place	Player	Score	To par	Money (US$)
1	(United States) Juli Inkster	69-68-75-67=279	−9	41,250
2	(Japan) Ayako Okamoto	69-72-73-66=280	−8	24,750
3	(United States) Betsy King	71-73-67-70=281	−7	17,875
4	(United States) Donna White	72-71-69-71=283	−5	15,125
5	(United States) JoAnne Carner	70-72-71-71=284	−4	12,375
T6	(United States) Beth Daniel	70-76-69-70=285	−3	9,281
T6	(United States) Dot Germain	71-72-72-70=285	−3	9,281
T8	(United States) Nancy Lopez	74-73-68-71=286	−2	6,531
T8	(United States) Patty Sheehan	72-70-73-71=286	−2	6,531
T10	(United States) Amy Alcott	74-73-70-70=287	−1	5,071
T10	(United States) Dianne Dailey	71-77-70-69=287	−1	5,071
T10	(United States) Patti Rizzo	72-74-70-71=287	−1	5,071
