= 2000 Solheim Cup =

Women's team golf competition

- Dates: 6–8 October 2000
- Venue: Loch Lomond Golf Club
- Location: Luss, Dunbartonshire, Scotland
- Captains: Dale Reid (Europe); Pat Bradley (USA)
(Europe)	14 1/2	11 1/2	(United States)
- Europe wins the Solheim Cup

Location map
- Location within Europe Location within Scotland

The 6th Solheim Cup Match was held between 6 and 8 October 2000 at Loch Lomond Golf Club, Luss, Dunbartonshire, Scotland. Europe won the trophy for the second time, by a score of 14 1/2 to 11 1/2 points. Carin Koch holed the winning putt, coming back from three down to beat Michele Redman.

== Teams ==
The European team consisted of seven automatic qualifiers and five wild card picks from Captain Dale Reid, presented on 3 September. The US team consisted of 10 automatic qualifiers and two picks from Captain Pat Bradley, presented on 24 September.

Europe

- Captain
  - Dale Reid – Ladybank, Scotland
- Automatic qualifiers
  - Sophie Gustafson – Särö, Sweden
  - Trish Johnson – Bristol, England
  - Laura Davies – Coventry, England
  - (England) Alison Nicholas – Gibraltar
  - Patricia Meunier-Lebouc – Dijon, France
  - Raquel Carriedo – Zaragoza, Spain
  - Annika Sörenstam – Stockholm, Sweden
- Captains Picks
  - Helen Alfredsson – Gothenburg, Sweden
  - Carin Koch – Kungälv, Sweden
  - Janice Moodie – Glasgow, Scotland
  - Liselotte Neumann – Finspång, Sweden
  - Catrin Nilsmark – Gothenburg, Sweden

United States

- Captain
  - Pat Bradley – Westford, Massachusetts
- Automatic qualifiers
  - Juli Inkster – Santa Cruz, California
  - Meg Mallon – Natick, Massachusetts
  - Rosie Jones – Santa Ana, California
  - Dottie Pepper – Saratoga Springs, New York
  - Sherri Steinhauer – Madison, Wisconsin
  - Pat Hurst – San Leandro, California
  - Kelly Robbins – Mt. Pleasant, Michigan
  - Michele Redman – Zanesville, Ohio
  - Nancy Scranton – Centralia, Illinois
  - Becky Iverson – Escanaba, Michigan
- Captains Picks
  - Brandie Burton – San Bernardino, California
  - Beth Daniel – Charleston, South Carolina

== Format ==
A total of 26 points were available, divided among three periods of team play, followed by one period of singles play. The first period, on Friday morning, was four rounds of foursomes. This was repeated in the second period on Friday afternoon. The third period on Saturday was six rounds of fourballs in which all 24 players (12 from each team) took part. The final 12 points were decided in a round of singles matchplay. This was a slight change from the 1998 format and was not kept, as the 2002 match reverted to the 1998 format.

== Day one ==
Friday, 6 October 2000

=== Morning foursomes ===
	Results
Davies/Nicholas	(Europe) 4 & 3	Inkster/Pepper
Johnson/Gustafson	(Europe) 3 & 2	Robbins/Hurst
Nilsmark/Koch	(Europe) 2 & 1	Burton/Iverson
Sörenstam/Moodie	(Europe) 1 up	Mallon/Daniel
4	Session	0
4	Overall	0

=== Afternoon foursomes ===
	Results
Davies/Nicholas	(United States) 6 & 5	Jones/Iverson
Johnson/Gustafson	halved	Inkster/Steinhauer
Neumann/Alfredsson	(United States) 1 up	Robbins/Hurst
Sörenstam/Moodie	(Europe) 1 up	Mallon/Daniel
1 1/2	Session	2 1/2
5 1/2	Overall	2 1/2

== Day two ==
Saturday, 7 October 2000

=== Fourball ===
	Results
Johnson/Gustafson	(Europe) 3 & 2	Jones/Iverson
Nicholas/Alfredsson	(Europe) 3 & 2	Inkster/Steinhauer
Nilsmark/Koch	(Europe) 2 & 1	Scranton/Redman
Neumann/Meunier-Lebouc	halved	Pepper/Burton
Davies/Carriedo	halved	Mallon/Daniel
Sörenstam/Moodie	(United States) 2 & 1	Robbins/Hurst
4	Session	2
9 1/2	Overall	4 1/2

== Day three ==
Sunday, 8 October 2000

=== Singles ===
	Results
Annika Sörenstam	(United States) 5 & 4	Juli Inkster
Sophie Gustafson	(United States) 4 & 3	Brandie Burton
Helen Alfredsson	(Europe) 4 & 3	Beth Daniel
Trish Johnson	(United States) 2 & 1	Dottie Pepper
Laura Davies	(United States) 3 & 2	Kelly Robbins
Liselotte Neumann	halved	Pat Hurst
Alison Nicholas	halved	Sherri Steinhauer
Patricia Meunier-Lebouc	(United States) 1 up	Meg Mallon
Catrin Nilsmark	(Europe) 1 up	Rosie Jones
Raquel Carriedo	(United States) 3 & 2	Becky Iverson
Carin Koch	(Europe) 2 & 1	Michele Redman
Janice Moodie	(Europe) 1 up	Nancy Scranton
5	Session	7
14 1/2	Overall	11 1/2

== Individual player records ==
Each entry refers to the win–loss–half record of the player.

=== Europe ===
Player	Points	Overall	Singles	Foursomes	Fourballs
Helen Alfredsson	2	2–1–0	1–0–0	0–1–0	1–0–0
Raquel Carriedo	0.5	0–1–1	0–1–0	0–0–0	0–0–1
Laura Davies	1.5	1–2–1	0–1–0	1–1–0	0–0–1
Sophie Gustafson	2.5	2–1–1	0–1–0	1–0–1	1–0–0
Trish Johnson	2.5	2–1–1	0–1–0	1–0–1	1–0–0
Carin Koch	3	3–0–0	1–0–0	1–0–0	1–0–0
Patricia Meunier-Lebouc	0.5	0–1–1	0–1–0	0–0–0	0–0–1
Janice Moodie	3	3–1–0	1–0–0	2–0–0	0–1–0
Liselotte Neumann	1	0–1–2	0–0–1	0–1–0	0–0–1
Alison Nicholas	2.5	2–1–1	0–0–1	1–1–0	1–0–0
Catrin Nilsmark	3	3–0–0	1–0–0	1–0–0	1–0–0
Annika Sörenstam	2	2–2–0	0–1–0	2–0–0	0–1–0

=== United States ===
Player	Points	Overall	Singles	Foursomes	Fourballs
Brandie Burton	1.5	1–1–1	1–0–0	0–1–0	0–0–1
Beth Daniel	0.5	0–3–1	0–1–0	0–2–0	0–0–1
Pat Hurst	2.5	2–1–1	0–0–1	1–1–0	1–0–0
Juli Inkster	1.5	1–2–1	1–0–0	0–1–1	0–1–0
Becky Iverson	2	2–2–0	1–0–0	1–1–0	0–1–0
Rosie Jones	1	1–2–0	0–1–0	1–0–0	0–1–0
Meg Mallon	1.5	1–2–1	1–0–0	0–2–0	0–0–1
Dottie Pepper	1.5	1–1–1	1–0–0	0–1–0	0–0–1
Michele Redman	0	0–2–0	0–1–0	0–0–0	0–1–0
Kelly Robbins	3	3–1–0	1–0–0	1–1–0	1–0–0
Nancy Scranton	0	0–2–0	0–1–0	0–0–0	0–1–0
Sherri Steinhauer	1	0–1–2	0–0–1	0–0–1	0–1–0
