= Mardi Lunn =

Australian professional golfer (born 1968)

Personal information
- Nationality: Australia
- Born: 9 January 1968 (age 58) Cowra, New South Wales, Australia
- Height: 5 ft 11 in (1.80 m)

Career
- Sport: Golf
- Turned professional: 1988
- Former tours: ALPG Tour; LPGA Tour (1994–2005); Ladies European Tour
- Professional wins: 5

Number of wins by tour
- LPGA Tour: 1
- Ladies European Tour: 1
- Ladies Asian Golf Tour: 1
- WPGA Tour of Australasia: 2

Best results in LPGA major championships
- Chevron Championship: 75th: 2004
- Women's PGA C'ship: T3: 1999
- U.S. Women's Open: T30: 1999
- du Maurier Classic: T23: 1999
- Women's British Open: CUT: 2001, 2004

Mardi Lunn (born 9 January 1968) is an Australian professional golfer.

== Career ==
Lunn played on several tours including the ALPG Tour, LPGA Tour, and Ladies European Tour. She has won five times worldwide.

Lunn has won once on the LPGA Tour in 1999. Lunn also took part in the largest playoff in LPGA Tour history at the 1999 Jamie Farr Kroger Classic. Se Ri Pak birdied the first sudden-death playoff hole to defeat Lunn, Karrie Webb, Carin Koch, Sherri Steinhauer, and Kelli Kuehne.

After retiring in 2006, Lunn has been a caddie for Lisa Hall on the Ladies European Tour.

== Personal life ==
Her sister, Karen Lunn, is also a professional golfer.

== Professional wins (5) ==
=== LPGA Tour wins (1) ===
No.	Date	Tournament	Winning score	Margin of victory	Runner-up
1	8 Aug 1999	areaWEB.COM Challenge	−13 (66-71-71-67=275)	1 stroke	(Australia) Jan Stephenson

LPGA Tour playoff record (0–1)

No.	Year	Tournament	Opponents	Result
1	1999	Jamie Farr Kroger Classic	(Sweden) Carin Koch (United States) Kelli Kuehne (South Korea) Se Ri Pak (United States) Sherri Steinhauer (Australia) Karrie Webb	Pak won with a birdie on the first extra hole

=== ALPG Tour wins (2) ===
- 1995 Daikyo Ladies Cup
- 2004 ABC Learning Centres Classic

=== Ladies European Tour wins (1) ===
- 1993 European Ladies Classic

=== Ladies Asia Golf Circuit wins (1) ===
- 1991 Thailand Ladies Open

== Team appearances ==
Amateur

- Tasman Cup (representing Australia): 1987 (tied)
- Queen Sirikit Cup (representing Australia): 1988 (winners)
