= Old Waverly Golf Club =

Golf course in Mississippi

Coordinates: 33.574302°N 88.607192°W

- Interactive map of Old Waverly Golf Club

Club information
- Location: West Point, Mississippi, U.S.
- Established: 1988
- Type: Private
- Total holes: 36
- Tournaments: U.S. Women's Open (1999); U.S. Women's Mid-Amateur (2006); U.S. Women's Amateur (2019)
- Website: oldwaverly.com

Old Waverly Golf Club
- Designed by: Jerry Pate and Bob Cupp (1988)
- Par: 72
- Length: 7,088 yd (6,481 m) (unofficial) Longest hole is #9 - 552 yd (505 m)
- Course rating: 74.0 (unofficial)
- Slope rating: 138 (unofficial)

Mossy Oak Golf Club
- Designed by: Gil Hanse (2016); Jerry Pate (2025)
- Par: 72
- Length: 7,212 yd (6,595 m) Longest hole is #12 - 612 yd (560 m)(unofficial)

Old Waverly Golf Club, located in West Point, Mississippi, is an 18-hole championship golf course founded by the George Bryan family and 29 other founders in 1988. Designed by U.S. Open Champion Jerry Pate and Bob Cupp, Old Waverly has hosted many tournaments across all levels of golf, most notably the 1999 U.S. Women's Open, 2006 U.S. Women's Mid-Amateur, and 2019 U.S. Women's Amateur. Old Waverly's second course, Mossy Oak Golf Club, was designed by Gil Hanse and opened September 2, 2016 on an adjacent property.

Old Waverly Golf Club transitioned to new ownership in 2024, making Old Waverly Golf Club and Mossy Oak Golf Club both private. As the new investors enhance the golf course and facilities, Mossy Oak Golf Club will close for nine months starting in January 2025 for renovations.

Hole	Yards	Handicap	Par	Hole	Yards	Handicap	Par
1	389	16	4	10	543	9	5
2	513	12	5	11	444	3	4
3	170	18	3	12	173	17	3
4	426	4	4	13	455	4	4
5	408	8	4	14	388	15	4
6	355	14	4	15	526	11	5
7	205	6	3	16	422	5	4
8	454	2	4	17	190	13	3
9	582	10	5	18	445	1	4
Out	3,502		36	In	3,586		36
Source:				Total	7,088		72

== Mossy Oak Golf Club ==
Designed by Gil Hanse, Mossy Oak Golf Club is Old Waverly's second course and opened for preview play September 2, 2016. Mossy Oak Golf Club was closed for renovation for the majority of 2025. The renovation was led by Jerry Pate and reopened for play in October.

== Course - Mossy Oak ==
Hole	Yards	Handicap	Par	Hole	Yards	Handicap	Par
1	465		4	10	311		4
2	485		4	11	250		3
3	299		4	12	587		5
4	184		3	13	358		4
5	622		5	14	476		4
6	430		4	15	223		3
7	607		5	16	414		4
8	375		4	17	523		5
9	145		3	18	458		4
Out	3,612		36	In	3,600		36
Source:				Total	7,212		72

== Gallery ==
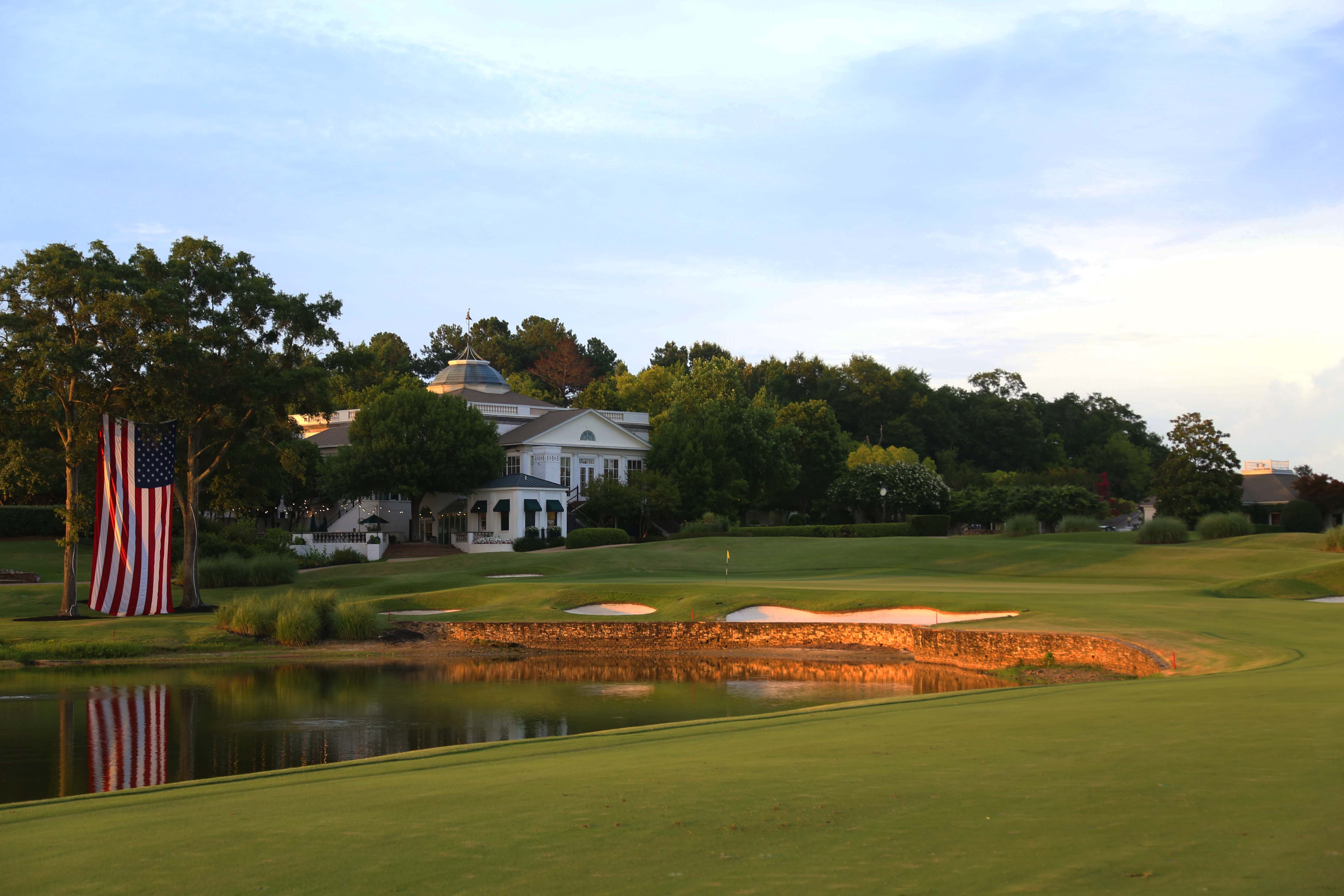
Old Waverly 18th hole and clubhouse
