= 1980 LPGA Championship =

Coordinates: 39.349°N 84.278°W

Tournament information
- Dates: June 5–8, 1980
- Location: Mason, Ohio
- Courses: Jack Nicklaus Golf Center; Grizzly Course
- Tour: LPGA Tour
- Format: Stroke play - 72 holes

Statistics
- Par: 72
- Length: 6,313 yards (5,773 m)
- Cut: 151 (+7)
- Prize fund: $150,000
- Winner's share: $22,500

Champion
- (South Africa) Sally Little
- 285 (−3)

Location in the United States
Location in Ohio

The 1980 LPGA Championship was the 26th LPGA Championship, played June 5–8 at Jack Nicklaus Golf Center at Kings Island in Mason, Ohio, a suburb northeast of Cincinnati.

Sally Little won the first of her two major titles, three strokes ahead of runner-up Jane Blalock.

== Final leaderboard ==
Sunday, June 8, 1980

Place	Player	Score	To par	Money ($)
1	(South Africa) Sally Little	69-70-73-73=285	−3	22,500
2	(United States) Jane Blalock	70-69-75-74=288	E	14,700
T3	(United States) Donna Caponi Young	72-73-72-72=289	+1	6,810
T3	(United States) JoAnne Carner	71-75-70-73=289	+1	6,810
T3	(United States) Beth Daniel	72-70-73-74=289	+1	6,810
T3	(United States) Dot Germain	76-70-72-71=289	+1	6,810
T3	(United States) Barbara Moxness	70-71-74-74=289	+1	6,810
8	(United States) Jo Ann Washam	72-73-71-74=290	+2	4,350
9	(United States) Vicki Fergon	73-74-70-74=291	+3	4,050
T10	(United States) Amy Alcott	73-71-75-73=292	+4	3,168
T10	(United States) Jerilyn Britz	69-76-74-73=292	+4	3,168
T10	(United States) Lori Garbacz	73-74-74-71=292	+4	3,168
T10	(United States) Sandra Palmer	72-71-68-81=292	+4	3,168
T10	(United States) Hollis Stacy	70-76-73-73=292	+4	3,168
