= Dot Germain =

American professional golfer (born 1947)

Personal information
- Full name: Dorothy Germain
- Nationality: United States
- Born: May 21, 1947 (age 79)
- Height: 5 ft 10 in (1.78 m)

Career
- Sport: Golf
- College: Monticello College; Southern Illinois; UNC-Greensboro
- Status: Professional
- Former tour: LPGA Tour (1974–1989)
- Professional wins: 1

Number of wins by tour
- LPGA Tour: 1

Best results in LPGA major championships
- Titleholders C'ship: 45th: 1972
- Chevron Championship: T15: 1983
- Women's PGA C'ship: T3: 1980
- U.S. Women's Open: T6: 1983
- du Maurier Classic: T6: 1984

Dorothy "Dot" Germain (born May 21, 1947) is an American professional golfer who played on the LPGA Tour. She is the niece of the amateur golfer Dorothy Germain Porter.

Germain won once on the LPGA Tour in 1980.

== Professional wins ==
=== LPGA Tour wins (1) ===
No.	Date	Tournament	Winning score	Margin of victory	Runners-up
1	Feb 17, 1980	S&H Golf Classic	−7 (69-71-69=209)	1 stroke	(United States) Donna Caponi (United States) Beth Daniel

LPGA Tour playoff record (0–1)

No.	Year	Tournament	Opponent	Result
1	1981	S&H Golf Classic	(United States) JoAnne Carner	Lost to par on first extra hole
