= Stefania Croce =

Italian professional golfer

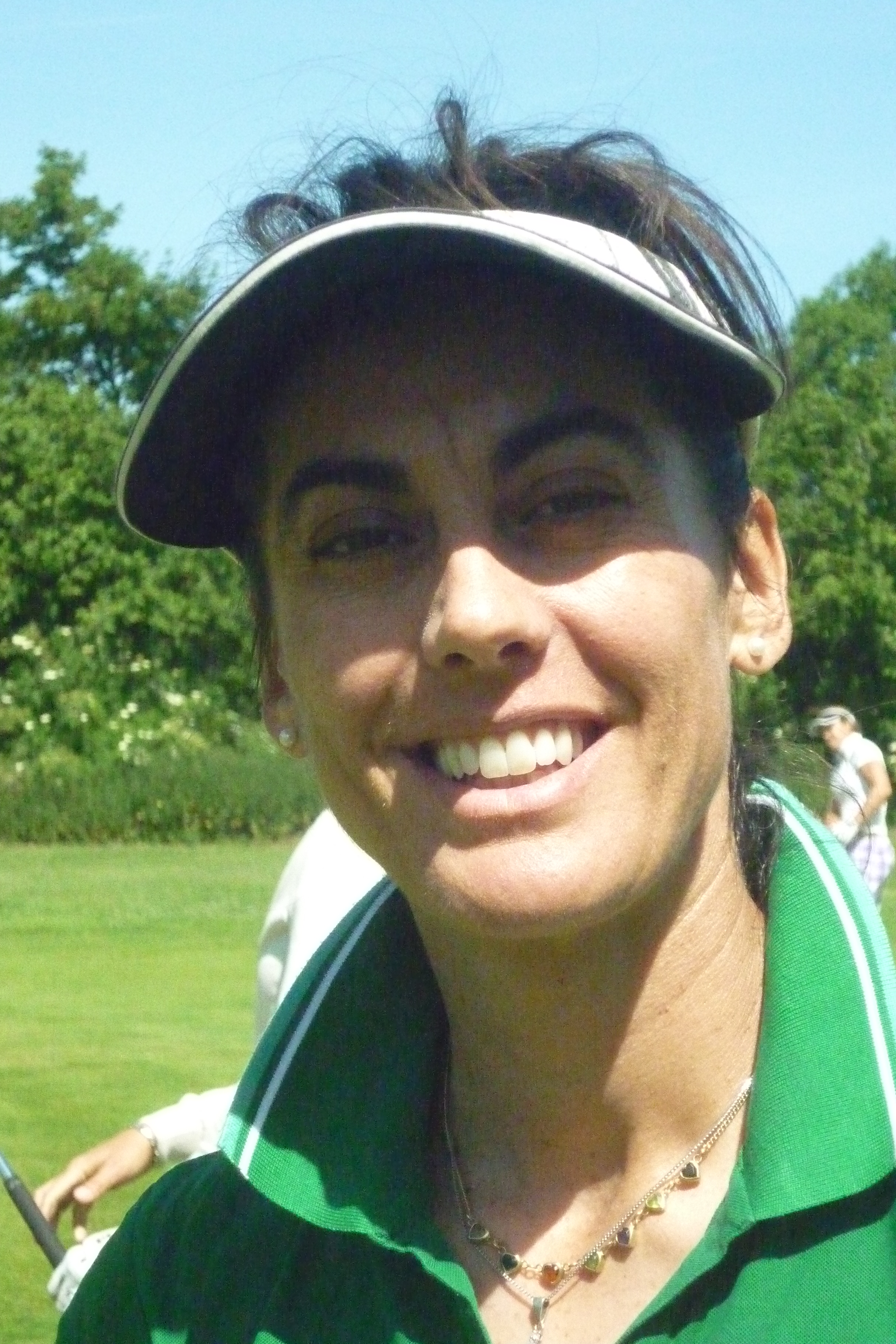

Personal information
- Full name: Stefania Croce
- Nationality: Italy
- Born: 17 May 1970 (age 56) Bergamo, Italy
- Height: 1.67 m (5 ft 6 in)

Career
- Sport: Golf
- Turned professional: 1989
- Current tour: Ladies European Tour
- Former tour: LPGA Tour (1993–2003)
- Professional wins: 1

Number of wins by tour
- Ladies European Tour: 1

Best results in LPGA major championships
- Chevron Championship: T28: 2001
- Women's PGA C'ship: 2nd: 2000
- U.S. Women's Open: T5: 1997
- du Maurier Classic: T52: 1993
- Women's British Open: CUT: 2004, 2007, 2008, 2011

Stefania Croce (born 17 May 1970) is an Italian professional golfer, who played on the Ladies European Tour and LPGA Tour. She won the 1992 Ford Ladies' Classic and lost a playoff to Juli Inkster at the 2000 LPGA Championship.

== Career ==
Croce enjoyed a successful amateur career where she won the 1986 Girls Amateur Championship at West Kilbride, the 1987 French International Lady Juniors Amateur Championship, and the 1988 AJGA Tournament of Champions. She represented Italy twice at the Espirito Santo Trophy, and in 1988 she had the lowest individual score alongside Carol Semple Thompson.

Croce turned professional in 1989 and joined the Ladies European Tour (LET), where she won the 1992 Ford Ladies' Classic at Woburn Golf and Country Club.

In 1993, Croce qualified for the LPGA Tour on her second attempt. She tied for 3rd at the 1996 Safeway LPGA Golf Championship, and tied for 5th at the 1997 U.S. Women's Open and 7th at the 1998 U.S. Women's Open.

Croce's best LPGA Tour performance came at the 2000 LPGA Championship, where she lost on the second hole to Juli Inkster in a sudden-death playoff.

In 2008, she started coaching the Italian national women's golf team. Croce played her last full LET season in 2016, and she finished 13th at the 2022 U.S. Senior Women's Open.

== Personal life ==
Her grandfather, Cesidio, was among the first Italian professionals, and her father, Angelo, and uncle, Alberto Croce, are professional golfers.

== Amateur wins ==
- 1986 Italian Girls Championship
- 1986 Girls Amateur Championship, Italian Girls Championpionship
- 1987 French International Lady Juniors Amateur Championship
- 1988 AJGA Tournament of Champions, Italian Strokeplay Championship

== Professional wins (1) ==
=== Ladies European Tour (1) ===
No.	Date	Tournament	Winning score	Margin of victory	Runners-up
1	3 May 1992	Ford Ladies' Classic	−10 (68-73-72-73=286)	3 strokes	(England) Trish Johnson (Switzerland) Evelyn Orley

== Playoff record ==
LPGA Tour playoff record (0–1)

No.	Year	Tournament	Opponent(s)	Result
1	2000	LPGA Championship	(United States) Juli Inkster	Lost to par on second extra hole

== Team appearances ==
Amateur

- European Ladies' Team Championship (representing Italy): 1985, 1989
- Vagliano Trophy (representing the Continent of Europe): 1987
- Espirito Santo Trophy (representing Italy): 1986, 1988
