= Los Angeles Women's Championship =

American golf tournament from 1997 to 2000

The Los Angeles Women's Championship was a golf tournament on the LPGA Tour from 1997 to 2000. It was played at the Oakmont Country Club in Glendale, California from 1997 to 1999 and at the Wood Ranch Golf Club in Simi Valley, California in 2000.

== Winners ==
Los Angeles Women's Championship

- 2000 Laura Davies

Valley of the Stars Championship

- 1999 Catrin Nilsmark

Los Angeles Women's Championship

- 1998 Dale Eggeling
- 1997 Terry-Jo Myers
