= 1994 LPGA Championship =

Tournament information
- Dates: May 12–15, 1994
- Location: Wilmington, Delaware; 39.789°N 75.564°W
- Course: DuPont Country Club
- Tour: LPGA Tour
- Format: Stroke play - 72 holes

Statistics
- Par: 71
- Length: 6,386 yards (5,839 m)
- Cut: 151 (+9)
- Prize fund: $1.1 million
- Winner's share: $165,000

Champion
- (England) Laura Davies
- 279 (−5)
- Location in United States Location in Delaware

The 1994 LPGA Championship was the 40th LPGA Championship, played May 12–15 at DuPont Country Club in Wilmington, Delaware.

Laura Davies shot a final round 68 to win the first of her two LPGA Championship titles, three strokes ahead of runner-up Alice Ritzman. It was the second of her four major titles.

This was the first of eleven consecutive LPGA Championships at DuPont, which had hosted the McDonald's Championship, a regular tour event, the previous seven seasons. McDonald's sponsored the LPGA Championship for sixteen editions, from 1994 through 2009.

Davies had won the regular tour event at DuPont the previous year for consecutive victories at the course.

== Final leaderboard ==
Sunday, May 15, 1994

Place	Player	Score	To par	Money ($)
1	(England) Laura Davies	70-72-69-68=279	−5	165,000
2	(United States) Alice Ritzman	68-73-71-70=282	−2	102,402
T3	(United States) Pat Bradley	73-73-70-67=283	−1	54,660
T3	(United States) Elaine Crosby	76-71-69-67=283	−1	54,660
T3	(Japan) Hiromi Kobayashi	72-73-71-67=283	−1	54,660
T3	(Sweden) Liselotte Neumann	74-73-67-69=283	−1	54,660
T7	(United States) Amy Alcott	71-75-70-69=285	+1	27,676
T7	(United States) Beth Daniel	72-74-68-71=285	+1	27,676
T7	(United States) Patty Sheehan	72-68-72-73=285	+1	27,676
T7	(United States) Sherri Steinhauer	75-70-72-68=285	+1	27,676
