= Florida's Natural Charity Championship =

Golf tournament

The Florida's Natural Charity Championship Hosted by Nancy Lopez was a golf tournament for professional female golfers that was part of the LPGA Tour from 1992 through 2006. For most of those years it was known as the Chick-fil-A Charity Championship. It was played annually at the Eagle's Landing Country Club in Stockbridge, Georgia.

The title sponsor from 1995 to 2005 was Chick-fil-A, a fast-food restaurant chain headquartered in Atlanta, Georgia, that specializes in chicken sandwiches. In 2006, Florida's Natural, a cooperative of Florida citrus growers took over title sponsorship.

It was announced in August 2006 that the tournament had been cancelled because of the lack of a sponsor for 2007.

LPGA Hall of Famer Nancy Lopez was associated with the tournament as its official host. She presented the Nancy Lopez Award to the world's best female amateur golfer at a banquet held each year during the tournament week. It is unclear where the Nancy Lopez Award ceremony will now be held.

Tournament names through the years:

- 1992: SEGA Women's Championship
- 1993-1994: Atlanta Women's Championship
- 1995-2005: Chick-fil-A Charity Championship
- 2006: Florida's Natural Charity Championship Hosted by Nancy Lopez

The last tournament was held from April 17 through April 23, 2006.

== Winners ==
Year	Champion	Country	Score	Purse	Winner's Share
2006	Sung Ah Yim	South Korea	272 (-16)	$1,400,000	$210,000
2005	Annika Sörenstam	Sweden	265 (-23)	$1,600,000	$240,000
2004	Jennifer Rosales	Philippines	274 (-14)	$1,600,000	$240,000
2003	Se Ri Pak	South Korea	200 (-16)	$1,350,000	$202,350
2002	Juli Inkster	United States	132 (-12)	$1,250,000	$187,500
2001	Annika Sörenstam	Sweden	203 (-13)	$1,200,000	$180,000
2000	Sophie Gustafson	Sweden	206 (-10)	$900,000	$135,000
1999	Rachel Hetherington	Australia	204 (-12)	$800,000	$120,000
1998	Liselotte Neumann	Sweden	202 (-14)	$700,000	$105,000
1997	Nancy Lopez	United States	137 (-7)	$550,000	$82,500
1996	Barb Mucha	United States	208 (-8)	$550,000	$82,500
1995	Laura Davies	England	201 (-15)	$500,000	$75,000
1994	Val Skinner	United States	206 (-10)	$650,000	$97,500
1993	Trish Johnson	England	282 (-6)	$600,000	$90,000
1992	Dottie Mochrie	United States	277 (-11)	$600,000	$90,000

1997 and 2002 tournaments were shortened to 36 holes due to rain.

== Tournament record ==
Year	Player	Score	Round
1999	Barb Mucha	62 (-10)	2nd round
