= Kelli Kuehne =

American professional golfer (born 1977)

Personal information
- Nationality: United States
- Born: May 11, 1977 (age 49) Dallas, Texas, U.S.
- Height: 5 ft 3 in (1.60 m)

Career
- Sport: Golf
- College: University of Texas
- Turned professional: 1996
- Former tour: LPGA Tour
- Professional wins: 1

Number of wins by tour
- LPGA Tour: 1

Best results in LPGA major championships
- Chevron Championship: 35th: 2001
- Women's PGA C'ship: T6: 2008
- U.S. Women's Open: 3rd: 1999
- du Maurier Classic: T18: 2000
- Women's British Open: T7: 2001

Kelli Kuehne Doremus (born May 11, 1977) is an American retired professional golfer.

== Amateur career ==
Kuehne was born in Dallas, Texas. She was the Texas UIL 4A Girls Individual State Champion four years in a row, 1992, 1993, 1994, 1995 while attending Highland Park High School in Dallas, Texas. In 1994 she won the U.S. Girls' Junior. The following year she won the U.S. Women's Amateur and in 1996 repeated as the U.S. Women's Amateur champion while also winning the British Ladies Amateur. She played college golf at the University of Texas where she was an All-American. She played on the 1996 Curtis Cup team.

== Professional career ==
Kuehne turned professional in 1996. She joined the LPGA Tour in 1998. Her only LPGA Tour win came at the 1999 LPGA Corning Classic. She played on the U.S. team in the Solheim Cup in 2002 and 2003.

At the 1999 Jamie Farr Kroger Classic, Kuehne took part in a six-player playoff. It was the biggest in LPGA history. Se Ri Pak birdied the first sudden death playoff hole to defeat Kuehne, Karrie Webb, Carin Koch, Sherri Steinhauer, and Mardi Lunn. Kuehne, who had finished play 90 minutes before the last group finished play, had left the golf course and gone back to her hotel. After getting a call from a LPGA official, Kuenhe raced back to the course just in time to take part in the playoff.

== Personal ==
Two of Kuehne's brothers are also golfers. Trip Kuehne was runner-up to Tiger Woods in the 1994 U.S. Amateur and won the 2007 U.S. Mid-Amateur. Hank Kuehne won the U.S. Amateur in 1998 before turning professional.

Kuehne was diagnosed with diabetes mellitus type 1 when she was ten years old, and started using an insulin pump in 1998.

== Amateur wins ==
- 1994 U.S. Girls' Junior
- 1995 U.S. Women's Amateur
- 1996 U.S. Women's Amateur, British Ladies Amateur

== Professional wins ==
=== LPGA Tour wins (1) ===
No.	Date	Tournament	Winning score	Margin of victory	Runner-up
1	May 30, 1999	LPGA Corning Classic	–10 (69-69-70-70=278)	1 stroke	(United States) Rosie Jones

LPGA Tour playoff record (0–2)

No.	Year	Tournament	Opponents	Result
1	1999	Jamie Farr Kroger Classic	(Sweden) Carin Koch (Australia) Mardi Lunn (South Korea) Se Ri Pak (United States) Sherri Steinhauer (Australia) Karrie Webb	Pak won with birdie on first extra hole
2	2000	LPGA Corning Classic	(United States) Vicki Goetze-Ackerman (United States) Betsy King	King won with birdie on second extra hole

== U.S. national team appearances ==
Amateur

- Curtis Cup: 1996
- Espirito Santo Trophy: 1996

Professional

- Solheim Cup: 2002 (winners), 2003
