= Juli Inkster =

American professional golfer (born 1960)

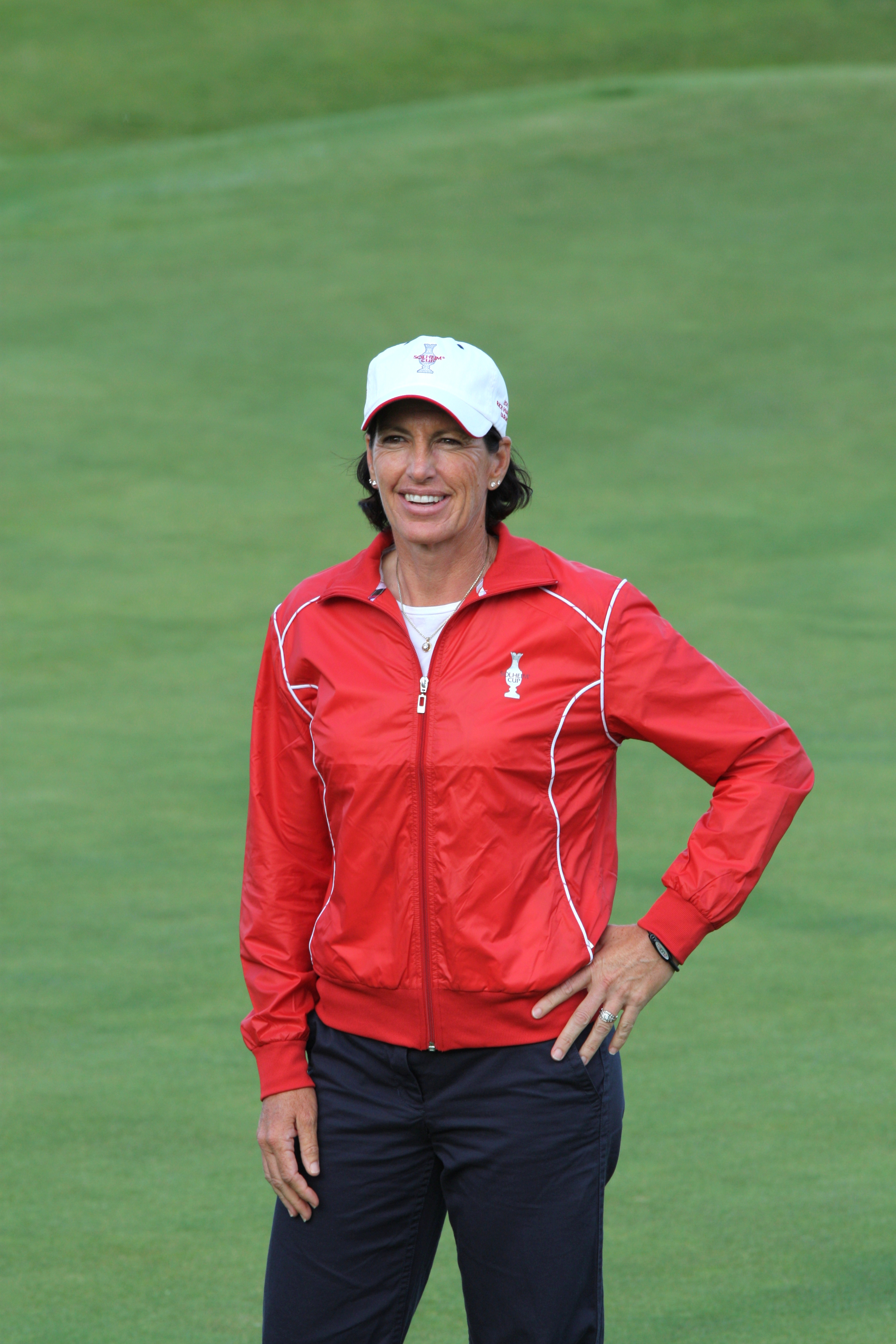
- Inkster in 2009

Personal information
- Full name: Juli Simpson Inkster
- Nationality: United States
- Born: June 24, 1960 (age 66) Santa Cruz, California, U.S.
- Height: 5 ft 7 in (1.70 m)
- Spouse: Brian Inkster (m. 1980)
- Children: Hayley, Cori

Career
- Sport: Golf
- College: San Jose State University
- Turned professional: 1983
- Current tours: LPGA Tour (joined 1983); Legends Tour
- Professional wins: 45

Number of wins by tour
- LPGA Tour: 31
- Ladies European Tour: 2
- Other: 13

Best results in LPGA major championships (wins: 7)
- Chevron Championship: Won: 1984, 1989
- Women's PGA C'ship: Won: 1999, 2000
- U.S. Women's Open: Won: 1999, 2002
- du Maurier Classic: Won: 1984
- Women's British Open: T4: 2006
- Evian Championship: T26: 2017

Achievements and awards
- World Golf Hall of Fame: 2000 (member page)
- Broderick Award for Golf: 1982
- LPGA Rookie of the Year: 1984
- GWAA Female Player of the Year: 1999
- ESPY Awards Best Female Golfer: 2000
- LPGA William and Mousie Powell Award: 2004, 2015
- GWAA ASAP/Murray: 2009
- LPGA Patty Berg Award: 2009
- Bob Jones Award: 2022
- (For a full list of awards, see here)

Juli Inkster (nee Simpson; born June 24, 1960) is an American professional golfer who plays on the LPGA Tour. With a professional career spanning 29 years to date, Inkster's 31 wins rank her second in wins among all active players on the LPGA Tour; she has over $14 million in career earnings. She also has more wins in Solheim Cup matches than any other American, and is a member of the World Golf Hall of Fame. Inkster is the only golfer in LPGA Tour history to win two majors in a decade for three consecutive decades by winning three in the 1980s, two in the 1990s, and two in the 2000s.

== Early life and amateur career ==
In 1960, Simpson was born and raised in Santa Cruz, California. She graduated from Harbor High School in 1978.

She played college golf at nearby San Jose State, where she was an All-American in 1979, 1981, and 1982. She was also All Nor-Cal 1979–1981 and SJSU Athlete of the Year in 1981, and is a member of the San Jose State Sports Hall of Fame. From 1980 to 1982, Inkster won three consecutive U.S. Women's Amateurs, her first victory coming three weeks after her marriage to Brian Inkster. She became the first woman since 1934 to win three consecutive U.S. Amateur titles.

She was a member of the winning U.S. Curtis Cup team in 1982. She was also a member of the winning U.S. team at the Espirito Santo Trophy in 1980 and 1982.

She won the 1981 California Women's Amateur Championship, was California's 1981 Amateur of the Year, and 1982 Bay Area Athlete of the Year. She won the Broderick Award, (now the Honda Sports Award) as the nation's best female collegiate golfer in 1982.

== Professional career ==
In 1983, Inkster turned professional. She enjoyed success in her rookie year of 1983 with a victory at the Safeco Classic. She won two major championships in 1984, her first full LPGA season, and was LPGA Rookie of the Year. She has won 31 tournaments on the LPGA Tour, including seven majors and the career Grand Slam for ladies' golf. As of 2012 she is fifth on the LPGA career money list. Inkster won a tournament in 16 out of 24 seasons from 1983 to 2006, but has never finished at the top of the money list; her best finishes were second in 1999, and third in both 1986 and 2002.

Inkster played on the United States Solheim Cup team nine times: in 1992, 1998, 2000, 2002, 2003, 2005, 2007, 2009, and 2011. She has won a total of 18.5 points, making her the winningest American Solheim Cup player as of 2011. She teamed with Pat Hurst, represented the United States at the 2007 Women's World Cup of Golf. She was voted Women's Sports Foundation Sportswoman of the Year in 1999 and was inducted into the World Golf Hall of Fame in 2000. She was recognized during the LPGA’s 50th Anniversary in 2000 as one of the LPGA’s top-50 players and teachers.

=== Senior career ===
Inkster was a player and assistant captain on the 2011 Solheim Cup team. She was the oldest player and the first playing assistant captain in Solheim Cup history.

In late 2011 at age 51, Inkster suffered the first major injury of her career, necessitating surgery in January 2012 to repair nerve and tendon damage in her right elbow. The surgery kept her out of the 2012 season until late June.

Inkster was the captain for the United States team in the 2015 Solheim Cup. The United States started the final day down 10–6, but mounted a historic comeback to capture the victory by a final score of 14.5–13.5. Inkster captained the United States team again in the 2017 Solheim Cup set at the Des Moines Golf and Country Club in West Des Moines, Iowa, which the team won 16.5-11.5. On January 31, 2018, it was announced that Inkster would captain the United States team for a third consecutive match in 2019 at Gleneagles. Europe won the match against United States 14.5–13.5.

Inkster has won four tournaments in the Legends Tour and finished second in the 2018 U.S. Senior Women's Open.

In 2014, Inkster began a career as a golf commentator for the Golf Channel, gaining experience as both interviewer and analyst. In 2015, she joined Fox Sports to serve as commentator for that network's coverage of USGA events.

== Awards and honors ==
- In 1982, Inkster earned the Broderick Award for Golf in the golf category, bestowed to the top female collegiate golfer.
- In 1984, she won the LPGA Rookie of the Year award.
- In 1989, she was honored with the GWAA Female Player of the Year award.
- In 1999, she won the Women's Sports Foundation Sportswoman of the Year.
- In 2000, she won the ESPY Awards Best Female Golfer.
- In 2004, she won the LPGA William and Mousie Powell Award.
- In 2009, she won the ASAPSports/Jim Murray Award.
- In 2009, she won the LPGA Patty Berg Award, dispensed to an individual who "exemplifies diplomacy, sportsmanship, goodwill and contributions to the game of golf."
- In 2022, she earned the Bob Jones Award bestowed by the United States Golf Association (USGA). It is given to individuals who demonstrate good sportsmanship over the course of their career.

== Professional wins (45) ==
=== LPGA Tour wins (31) ===
Legend
LPGA Tour major championships (7)
Other LPGA Tour (24)

No.	Date	Tournament	Winning score	Margin of victory	Runner(s)-up	Ref
1	Sep 18, 1983	Safeco Classic	−6 (69-71-72-71=283)	1 stroke	(United States) Kathy Whitworth	
2	Apr 1, 1984	Nabisco Dinah Shore	−8 (70-73-69-68=280)	Playoff	(United States) Pat Bradley	
3	Jul 29, 1984	du Maurier Classic	−9 (69-68-74-67=279)	1 stroke	(Japan) Ayako Okamoto	
4	Jun 30, 1985	Lady Keystone Open	−7 (69-72-68=209)	2 strokes	(United States) Betsy King	
5	Mar 9, 1986	Women's Kemper Open	−12 (72-64-70-70=276)	1 stroke	(United States) Amy Alcott	
6	Jun 8, 1986	McDonald's Championship	−7 (68-67-69-77=281)	3 strokes	(United States) Mary Beth Zimmerman	
7	Jun 15, 1986	Lady Keystone Open (2)	−6 (70-7-70=210)	Playoff	(United States) Debbie Massey (United States) Cindy Hill	
8	Aug 24, 1986	Atlantic City LPGA Classic	−4 (67-71-71=209)	3 strokes	(United States) Patti Rizzo	
9	May 8, 1988	Crestar Classic	−7 (70-70-69=209)	Playoff	(United States) Nancy Lopez (United States) Rosie Jones (United States) Betsy King	
10	Aug 21, 1988	Atlantic City Classic (2)	−7 (72-69-65=206)	Playoff	(United States) Beth Daniel	
11	Sep 15, 1988	Safeco Classic (2)	−10 (76-70-65-67=278)	3 strokes	(South Korea) Ok-Hee Ku	
12	Apr 2, 1989	Nabisco Dinah Shore (2)	−9 (66-69-73-71=279)	5 strokes	(United States) JoAnne Carner (United States) Tammie Green	
13	May 7, 1989	Crestar Classic (2)	−6 (69-72-69=210)	5 strokes	(United States) Beth Daniel (Sweden) Liselotte Neumann	
14	Jul 28, 1991	LPGA Bay State Classic	−13 (70-72-66-67=275)	1 stroke	(United States) Caroline Keggi	
15	Jul 19, 1992	JAL Big Apple Classic	−11 (66-64-69-74=273)	2 strokes	(United States) Nancy Lopez	
16	Oct 19, 1997	Samsung World Championship of Women's Golf	−8 (67-74-72-67=280)	Playoff	(United States) Kelly Robbins (Sweden) Helen Alfredsson	
17	Oct 25, 1998	Samsung World Championship of Women's Golf (2)	−13 (70-73-66-66=275)	3 strokes	(Sweden) Annika Sörenstam	
18	Mar 15, 1999	Welch's/Circle K Championship	−15 (68-71-69-65=273)	1 stroke	(United States) Dottie Pepper	
19	Apr 4, 1999	Longs Drugs Challenge	−8 (69-67-73-70=279)	4 strokes	(United States) Sherri Steinhauer	
20	Jun 6, 1999	U.S. Women's Open	−16 (65-69-67-71=272)	5 strokes	(United States) Sherri Turner	
21	Jun 20, 1999	McDonald's LPGA Championship	−16 (68-66-69-65=268)	4 strokes	(Sweden) Liselotte Neumann	
22	Sep 26, 1999	Safeway LPGA Golf Championship	−9 (67-70-70=207)	6 strokes	(United States) Tina Barrett (South Korea) Grace Park	
23	Apr 16, 2000	Longs Drugs Challenge (2)	−13 (70-67-66-72=275)	5 strokes	(United States) Brandie Burton	
24	Jun 25, 2000	LPGA Championship (2)	−3 (72-69-65-75=281)	Playoff	(Italy) Stefania Croce	
25	Oct 15, 2000	Samsung World Championship	−14 (69-67-69-69=274)	4 strokes	(Sweden) Annika Sörenstam	
26	May 13, 2001	Electrolux USA Championship	−14 (73-67-69-65=274)	1 stroke	(Scotland) Catriona Matthew	
27	May 5, 2002	Chick-fil-A Charity Championship	−12 (66-66=132)	2 strokes	(United States) Kelly Robbins	
28	Jul 7, 2002	U.S. Women's Open (2)	−4 (67-72-71-66=276)	2 strokes	(Sweden) Annika Sörenstam	
29	May 25, 2003	LPGA Corning Classic	−24 (66-68-67-62=264)	4 strokes	(Canada) Lorie Kane	
30	Jul 26, 2003	Evian Masters	−21 (66-72-64-65=267)	6 strokes	(South Korea) Hee-Won Han	
31	Mar 19, 2006	Safeway International	−15 (68-68-70-67=273)	2 strokes	(South Korea) Sarah Lee	

LPGA Tour playoff record (6–4)

No.	Year	Tournament	Opponent(s)	Result
1	1984	Nabisco Dinah Shore	(United States) Pat Bradley	Won with par on first extra hole
2	1986	Lady Keystone Open	(United States) Cindy Hill (United States) Debbie Massey	Won with par on first extra hole
3	1988	Crestar Classic	(United States) Rosie Jones (United States) Betsy King (United States) Nancy Lopez	Won with eagle on first extra hole
4	1988	Atlantic City Classic	(United States) Beth Daniel	Won with par on first extra hole
5	1992	Nabisco Dinah Shore	(United States) Dottie Mochrie	Lost to par on first extra hole
6	1992	U.S. Women's Open	(United States) Patty Sheehan	Lost 18-hole playoff (Sheehan:72, Inkster:74)
7	1997	Samsung World Championship of Women's Golf	(Sweden) Helen Alfredsson (United States) Kelly Robbins	Won with birdie on first extra hole
8	2000	LPGA Championship	(Italy) Stefania Croce	Won with par on second extra hole
9	2007	SemGroup Championship	(South Korea) Mi-Hyun Kim	Lost to par on first extra hole
10	2008	SemGroup Championship	(United States) Paula Creamer	Lost to birdie on second extra hole

=== Ladies European Tour wins (2) ===
- 2000 Compaq Open
- 2003 Evian Masters (co-sanctioned with LPGA Tour)

=== Other wins (7) ===
- 1986 JCPenney Classic (with Tom Purtzer)
- 1990 Spalding Invitational
- 1996 Diners Club Matches (with Dottie Pepper)
- 1997 Diners Club Matches (with Dottie Pepper), Gillette Tour Challenge (with Rosie Jones)
- 1999 Diners Club Matches (with Dottie Pepper)
- 2000 Hyundai Team Matches (with Dottie Pepper)

=== Legends Tour wins (6) ===
- 2015 Legends Championship
- 2016 Walgreens Charity Classic, Walgreens Charity Championship
- 2017 Walgreens Charity Classic
- 2019 Suquamish Clearwater Legends Cup
- 2021 Land O'Lakes Legends Classic

== Major championships ==
=== Wins (7) ===
No.	Year	Championship	Winning score	Margin of victory	Runner(s)-up
1	1984	Nabisco Dinah Shore	−8 (70-73-69-68=280)	Playoff ^{1}	(United States) Pat Bradley
2	1984	du Maurier Classic	−9 (69-68-75-67=279)	1 stroke	(Japan) Ayako Okamoto
3	1989	Nabisco Dinah Shore	−9 (66-69-73-71=279)	5 strokes	(United States) JoAnne Carner, (United States) Tammie Green
4	1999	McDonald's LPGA Championship	−16 (68-66-69-65=268)	4 strokes	(Sweden) Liselotte Neumann
5	1999	U.S. Women's Open	−16 (65-69-67-71=272)	5 strokes	(United States) Sherri Turner
6	2000	McDonald's LPGA Championship	−3 (72-69-65-75=281)	Playoff ^{2}	(Italy) Stefania Croce
7	2002	U.S. Women's Open	−4 (67-72-71-66=276)	2 strokes	(Sweden) Annika Sörenstam

^{1} Defeated Bradley on the first hole of a sudden-death playoff
^{2} Defeated Croce on the second hole of a sudden-death playoff

=== Results timeline ===
Results not in chronological order before 2019.

Tournament	1978	1979	1980	1981	1982	1983	1984	1985	1986	1987	1988	1989
ANA Inspiration							1	T19	T5	T17	T12	1
Women's PGA Championship							T7	T25	T3	T9	T61	T65
U.S. Women's Open	T23	CUT		CUT	T29	T21	T27	CUT	T69	T40	T8	
du Maurier Classic							1	T43	T22	T39	T16	

Tournament	1990	1991	1992	1993	1994	1995	1996	1997	1998	1999
ANA Inspiration	T11	T30	2	T40		T16	T19	T16	T24	6
Women's PGA Championship	CUT	9	9	T65	T14	T47	T5	T53	T16	1
U.S. Women's Open	CUT	CUT	2	T39	T18	T37	T34	T14	CUT	1
du Maurier Classic	CUT	T36	3	T52	CUT	3	T12	T5	T14	3

Tournament	2000	2001	2002	2003	2004	2005	2006	2007	2008	2009
ANA Inspiration	T17	T15	T19	T11	T28	7	5	DQ	T58	CUT
Women's PGA Championship	1	T15	T4	T37	T6	T13	T34	T21		T44
U.S. Women's Open	T23	T12	1	8	T58	T38	6	CUT	CUT	T26
Women's British Open ^	T5	CUT	CUT	T41	T25	T15	T4	T33	T14	CUT

Tournament	2010	2011	2012	2013	2014	2015	2016	2017	2018	2019
ANA Inspiration	CUT	T15		CUT	T64	T64	T36	T63	CUT	CUT
U.S. Women's Open	CUT	CUT	CUT	CUT	T15					
Women's PGA Championship	T62	T34		CUT	T30	T53	T50		CUT	
The Evian Championship ^^				T37	T50	T38	CUT	T26		
Women's British Open	T21	CUT	T23	CUT		CUT				

^ The Women's British Open replaced the du Maurier Classic as an LPGA major in 2001.
^^ The Evian Championship was added as a major in 2013.

Win
Top 10
Did not play

CUT = missed the half-way cut.
DQ = disqualified
T = tied

=== Summary ===
Tournament	Wins	2nd	3rd	Top-5	Top-10	Top-25	Events	Cuts made
ANA Inspiration	2	0	0	4	7	20	34	28
U.S. Women's Open	2	1	0	3	6	13	35	23
Women's PGA Championship	2	0	1	5	10	16	32	29
The Evian Championship	0	0	0	0	0	0	5	4
Women's British Open	0	0	0	2	2	7	16	9
du Maurier Classic	1	0	3	5	5	9	15	13
Totals	7	1	4	19	30	65	137	106

- Most consecutive cuts made – 16 (twice)
- Longest streak of top-10s – 4 (twice)

== LPGA Tour career summary ==
Year	Tournaments played	Cuts made*	Wins	2nds	3rds	Top tens	Best finish	Earnings ($)	Money list rank	Scoring average	Scoring rank
1978	1	1	0	0	0	0	T23	n/a		74.75	
1979	1	0	0	0	0	0	MC	n/a		81.50	
1980	2	2	0	0	0	0	11	n/a		73.80	
1981	1	1	0	0	0	0	T52	n/a		78.00	
1982	4	4	0	0	0	0	T14	n/a		74.56	
1983	8	8	1	1	0	2	1	52,220	30	72.92	
1984	23	23	2	1	0	10	1	186,501	6	73.07	
1985	27	22	1	1	0	7	1	99,651	19	73.13	
1986	23	23	4	1	2	9	1	285,293	3	72.15	
1987	24	24	0	0	0	12	T4	140,739	14	72.27	
1988	26	25	3	0	1	12	1	235,344	10	71.78	
1989	21	16	2	0	1	4	1	180,848	14	72.98	
1990	18	13	0	0	0	3	5	54,251	73	73.32	
1991	26	21	1	0	1	6	1	213,096	17	72.28	
1992	23	22	1	2	1	10	1	392,063	7	71.43	
1993	21	15	0	1	0	2	2	116,583	47	72.50	52
1994	16	13	0	1	0	3	2	113,829	49	72.00	23
1995	20	16	0	1	2	5	2	195,739	33	72.46	36
1996	22	20	0	0	0	7	4	259,660	21	71.64	11
1997	24	24	1	1	3	10	1	557,988	6	70.64	4
1998	25	23	1	3	0	12	1	656,012	6	70.78	6
1999	24	23	5	0	3	18	1	1,337,253	2	70.04	2
2000	19	18	3	3	2	13	1	980,330	4	70.73	4
2001	20	18	1	0	0	5	1	445,087	22	71.34	14
2002	20	18	2	2	0	10	1	1,154,349	3	70.82	6
2003	21	18	2	1	1	9	1	1,028,205	5	70.55	6
2004	21	21	0	1	1	7	T2	654,967	13	70.87	12
2005	19	19	0	1	1	6	2	579,240	24	71.33	7
2006	21	21	1	2	0	12	1	1,326,442	7	70.48	5
2007	20	18	0	1	2	6	2	736,521	18	72.09	22
2008	18	16	0	1	1	3	2	441,484	38	71.78	25
2009	20	18	0	0	0	1	T10	259,339	51	72.08	39
2010	21	19	0	1	0	3	2	402,974	29	71.93	30
2011	20	14	0	0	0	4	T4	298,123	36	72.38	35
2012	6	3	0	0	0	0	T23	48,815	100	73.31	n/a
2013	21	13	0	0	0	0	T13	150,628	69	72.53	69
2014	14	10	0	0	0	0	T15	125,505	82	72.83	109
2015	13	9	0	0	0	1	T7	133,489	80	72.07	60
2016	13	9	0	0	0	0	T19	104,433	97	71.63	51
2017	10	7	0	0	0	0	T24	69,693	120	71.74	73
2018	11	1	0	0	0	0	T69	3,050	176	73.33	149
2019	6	0	0	0	0	0	MC	0	n/a	74.17	n/a
2020	3	1	0	0	0	0	T70	3,274	172	72.71	n/a
2021	4	1	0	0	0	0	T66	5,084	178	72.80	n/a
2022	1	0	0	0	0	0	MC	0	n/a	78.00	n/a

- official as of 2022 season

* Includes match play and other events without a cut.

== U.S. national team appearances ==
Amateur

- Curtis Cup: 1982 (winners)
- Espirito Santo Trophy: 1980 (winners), 1982 (winners)

Professional

- Solheim Cup: 1992, 1998 (winners), 2000, 2002 (winners), 2003, 2005 (winners), 2007 (winners), 2009 (winners), 2011, 2015 (non-playing captain, winners), 2017 (non-playing captain, winners), 2019 (non-playing captain)
- World Cup: 2007, 2008
- Handa Cup: 2014 (winners), 2015 (winners)

=== Solheim Cup record ===
Year	Total matches	Total W-L-H	Singles W-L-H	Foursomes W-L-H	Fourballs W-L-H	Points won	Points %
Career	34	15–12–7	6–1–2	6–6–3	3–5–2	18.5	54.4
1992	3	1–1–1	1–0–0 def. A. Nicholas 3&2	0–0–1 halved w/ P. Sheehan	0–1–0 lost w/ P. Sheehan 1 up	1.5	50.0
1998	4	3–1–0	0–1–0 lost to H. Alfredsson 2&1	2–0–0 won w/ D. Pepper 3&1, won w/ D. Pepper 1 up	1–0–0 won w/ M. Mallon 2&1	3.0	75.0
2000	4	1–2–1	1–0–0 def. A. Sörenstam 5&4	0–1–1 lost w/ D. Pepper 4&3, halved w/ S. Steinhauer	0–1–0 lost w/ S. Steinhauer 3&2	1.5	37.5
2002	4	2–2–0	1–0–0 def. R. Carriedo 4&3	1–1–0 lost w/ L. Diaz 2 up, won w/ M. Mallon 2&1	0–1–0 lost w/ K. Kuehne 3&2	2.0	50.0
2003	4	3–1–0	1–0–0 def. C. Koch 5&4	0–1–0 lost w/ W. Ward 5&3	2–0–0 won w/ B. Daniel 1 up, won w/ B. Daniel 5&4	3.0	75.0
2005	4	2–1–1	1–0–0 def. S. Gustafson 2&1	1–0–0 won w/ P. Creamer 3&2	0–1–1 lost w/ P. Creamer 4&3, halved w/ B. Daniel	2.5	62.5
2007	4	2–0–2	1–0–0 def. I. Tinning 4&3	1–0–1 won w/ P. Creamer 2&1, halved w/ P. Creamer	0–0–1 halved w/ S. Prammanasudh	3.0	75.0
2009	4	1–2–1	0–0–1 halved w/ G. Nocera	1–1–0 won w/ P. Creamer 2&1, lost w/ P. Creamer 4&3	0–1–0 lost w/ A. Stanford 1 up	1.5	37.5
2011	3	0–2–1	0–0–1 halved w/ L. Davies	0–2–0 lost w/ B. Lang 1 dn, lost w/ B. Lang 3&2	0–0–0	0.5	16.7

== See also ==
- List of female golfers
- List of golfers with most LPGA Tour wins
- List of golfers with most LPGA major championship wins
- Women's Career Grand Slam winners
