= Catrin Nilsmark =

Swedish professional golfer (born 1967)

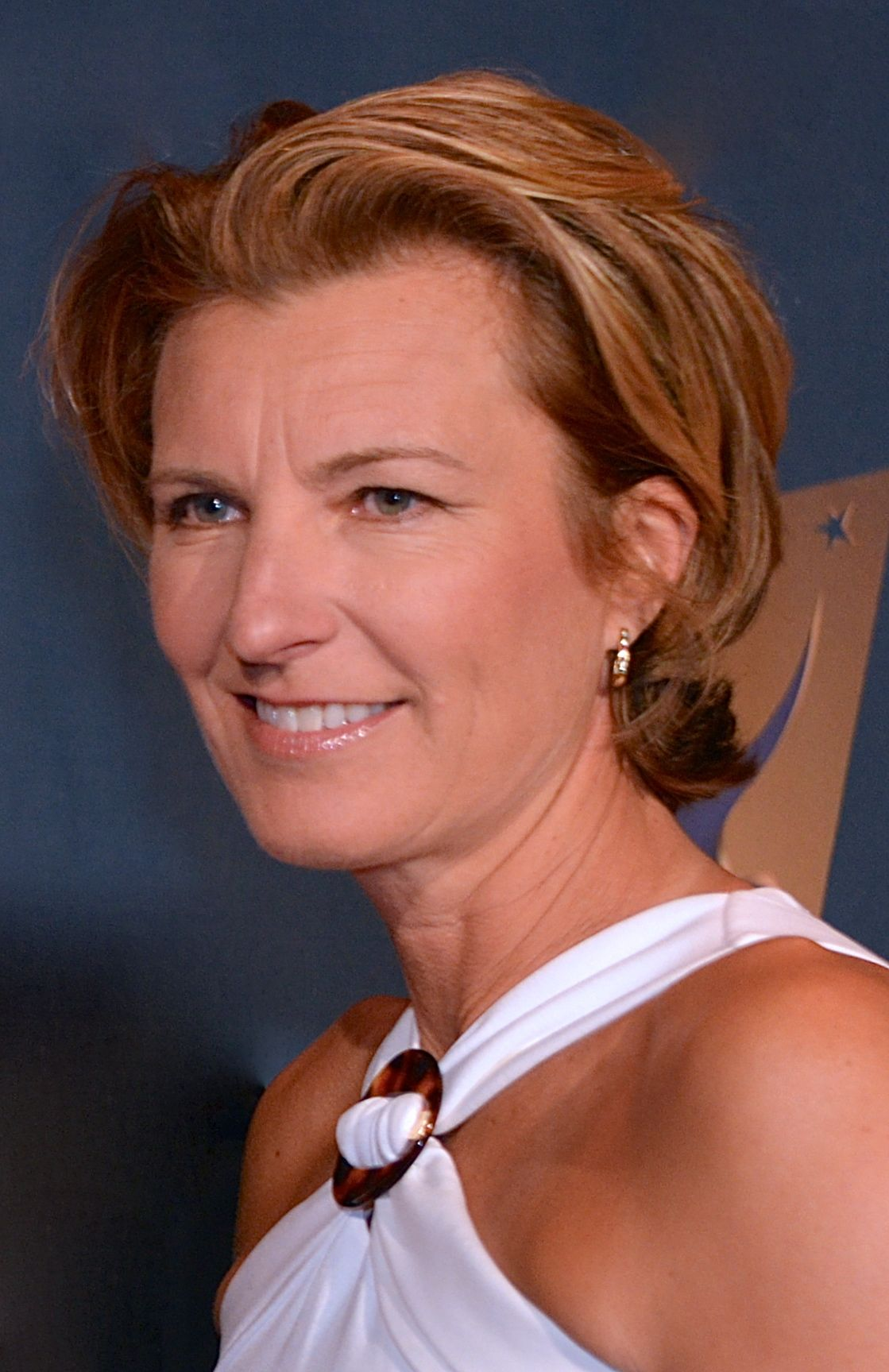
- Nilsmark (2013)

Personal information
- Full name: Maria Catrin Sandberg Nilsmark
- Nationality: Sweden
- Born: 30 August 1967 (age 59) Gothenburg, Sweden
- Height: 5 ft 11 in (1.80 m)
- Spouse: Per-Uno Sandberg
- Children: Tuva Augusta, Sigge

Career
- Sport: Golf
- College: University of South Florida
- Turned professional: 1987
- Former tours: LPGA Tour (1995–2005); Ladies European Tour
- Professional wins: 8

Number of wins by tour
- LPGA Tour: 1
- Ladies European Tour: 2
- Other: 5

Best results in LPGA major championships
- Chevron Championship: T15: 2003
- Women's PGA C'ship: T9: 1998
- U.S. Women's Open: 7th: 1996
- du Maurier Classic: T34: 1999
- Women's British Open: T4: 2002

Catrin Maria Nilsmark (born 30 August 1967) is a Swedish professional golfer. She played on both the United States–based LPGA Tour and the Ladies European Tour. She appeared for Europe at the Solheim Cup five times and captained the winning team in 2003.

== Early life and amateur career ==
Nilsmark was born in Gothenburg, Sweden. She grew up in Lerum east of Gothenburg and began her golf career at Öijared Golf Club, Sweden's first golf club with two 18-hole courses.

In 1984, she became the Swedish Youth under-19 Champion. She won the Orange Bowl International Junior Championship in Coral Gables, Florida in December 1984. She played one year of collegiate golf at the University of South Florida in Tampa, Florida.

== Professional career ==
In 1987, Nilsmark turned professional. Her early career was hampered by a whiplash injury sustained in a car accident. She had her maiden LET victory at the 1994 Ford Golf Classic at Woburn Golf and Country Club, England and joined the U.S.-based LPGA Tour in 1995 having tied for 15th at the 1994 LPGA Final Qualifying Tournament to earn exempt status.

She had two victories in 1999. On the Ladies European Tour, she won the Evian Masters in Évian-les-Bains, France, beating Laura Davies, who was at the top of her career, with two strokes. That victory came the year before the tournament became an LPGA co-sanctioned event. It was later designated by the LPGA Tour as a major championship in women's golf. Nilsmark also won the 1999 Valley of the Stars Championship at the Oakmont Country Club in Glendale, California on the LPGA Tour, beating Annika Sörenstam in a playoff. Nilsmark finished the year a career best second on the Ladies European Tour and 40th on the LPGA Tour.

Nilsmark played in the Solheim Cup in 1992, 1994, 1996, 1998 and 2000, sinking the winning putt in 1992 in Europe's first victory over the United States. She was the victorious European Solheim Cup captain in 2003 at Barsebäck Golf &Country Club in her native Sweden, despite suffering from a serious back injury and leading the European team walking with crutches on the course, and the losing captain in the 2005 match. She was captain of The 2007 European PING Junior Solheim Cup Team.

Her career was interrupted by injuries and pregnancy in 2004, but in 2008, she came back to competitive golf, playing regularly on the Swedish Golf Tour, at the time named SAS Masters Tour, representing Vidbynäs Golf Club and winning twice. She later came to represent Stockholm Golf Club.

She worked as a golf commentator in Sweden at the television channel Viasat Golf 2007–2017.

After retiring from tournament golf in 2008, she came back at 52 years of age, playing two tournaments on the Swedish Golf Tour in 2019.

== Personal life ==
In 1995, Nilsmark married Henrik Wickberg. After their divorce, she 1998-2007 was married to Fredrik Hellqvist, sport journalist and former head of Swedish European Tour tournament Scandinavian Masters 2005–2013. During her LPGA Tour career, Nilsmark and Hellqvist, who changed his last name to Nilsmark, lived in West Palm Beach, Florida, United States, in a house formerly owned by Tony Jacklin and situated close to were Swedish golfer Jesper Parnevik lived.

She later married Per-Uno Sandberg and the couple resides in Danderyd, north of Stockholm, Sweden.

She has two children: daughter Tuva Augusta, born 1997 and son, Sigge, born 2004. In the seventh month of her pregnancy in 1997, she competed in the LET tournament Compaq Open in Stockholm, Sweden, finishing lone runner-up to Annika Sörenstam, ahead of third placed Nancy Lopez. The following week, she won on the Swedish Golf Tour.

== Awards and honors ==
- In 1992, she was, by the Swedish Golf Federation, awarded the Golden Club, the highest award for contributions to Swedish golf, as the 15th recipient.
- In 1994, she earned Elite Sign No. 99 by the Swedish Golf Federation, on the basis of national team appearances and national championship performances.
- In 1998, Nilsmark was awarded honorary member of the PGA of Sweden.
- She is an honorary member at Öijared Golf Club, Sweden and at Dalmahoy Hotel & Country Club, Edinburgh, Scotland.

== Amateur wins ==
- 1984 Swedish Youth under-19 Championship, Orange Bowl International Junior Championship

== Professional wins (8) ==
=== LPGA Tour wins (1) ===
No.	Date	Tournament	Winning score	Margin of victory	Runner-up	Ref
1	14 Feb 1999	Valley of the Stars Championship	–12 (68-65-71=204)	Playoff	(Sweden) Annika Sörenstam	

LPGA Tour playoff record (1–0)

No.	Year	Tournament	Opponent	Result
1	1999	Valley of the Stars Championship	(Sweden) Annika Sörenstam	Won with par on first extra hole

=== Ladies European Tour wins (2) ===
No.	Date	Tournament	Winning score	Margin of victory	Runner(s)-up	Ref
1	24 Apr 1994	Ford Golf Classic	−12 (73-68-73-70=284)	4 strokes	(England) Trish Johnson, (England) Joanne Morley	
2	12 Jun 1999	Evian Masters	−9 (69-70-72-68=279)	2 strokes	(England) Laura Davies	(Note: Note: Nilsmark won The Evian Championship (formerly named the Evian Masters) before it was co-sanctioned by the LPGA Tour in 2000 and recognized as a major championship on the LPGA Tour in 2013.)

=== Swedish Golf Tour wins (5) ===
Legend
National Championships (2)
Other Swedish Golf Tour (3)

No.	Date	Tournament	Winning score	Margin of victory	Runner(s)-up
1	19 May 1991	Höganäs Ladies Open	212 (−4)	5 strokes	(Sweden) Maria Bertilsköld (a)
2	31 Aug 1997	Lerum Ladies Open	209 (−7)	6 strokes	(Sweden) Sara Melin, (Sweden) Susann Norberg (Sweden) Pernilla Sterner, (Sweden) Malin Tveit
3	7 Sep 1997	Öhrlings Swedish Matchplay	3&2		(Sweden) Nina Karlsson
4	6 Jun 2008	IT-Arkitekterna Ladies Open	219 (+3)	2 strokes	(Sweden) Josefin Leijon, (Czech Republic) Zuzana Mašínová
5	30 Aug 2008	PGA Ladies Open	219 (+3)	1 stroke	(Czech Republic) Zuzana Mašínová

== Results in LPGA majors ==
Tournament	1995	1996	1997	1998	1999	2000
Kraft Nabisco Championship			CUT		CUT	T57
LPGA Championship	CUT	CUT		T9	T54	T56
U.S. Women's Open	CUT	7	T33	CUT	T16	
du Maurier Classic	CUT	T53	CUT		T34	

Tournament	2001	2002	2003	2004	2005	2006	2007
Kraft Nabisco Championship	T68	CUT	T15		73		
LPGA Championship			CUT				
U.S. Women's Open	T34						
Women's British Open ^	CUT	T4	T41				T48

^ The Women's British Open replaced the du Maurier Classic as an LPGA major in 2001.

Top 10
Did not play

CUT = missed the half-way cut.
"T" tied.

== Team appearances ==
Professional

- Solheim Cup (representing Europe): 1992 (winners), 1994, 1996, 1998, 2000 (winners), 2003 (non-playing captain, winners), 2005 (non-playing captain)
- Praia d'El Rey European Cup (representing Ladies European Tour): 1998 (tie)
- Handa Cup (representing World team): 2012 (tie)
