= Jackie Gallagher-Smith =

American professional golfer (born 1967)

Personal information
- Nationality: United States
- Born: December 11, 1967 (age 58) Marion, Indiana, U.S.
- Height: 5 ft 5 in (1.65 m)

Career
- Sport: Golf
- College: Louisiana State University
- Turned professional: 1990
- Former tours: LPGA Tour (joined 1994); Futures Tour (1991–1996); Ladies Asian Tour
- Professional wins: 1

Number of wins by tour
- LPGA Tour: 1

Best results in LPGA major championships
- Chevron Championship: T39: 2003
- Women's PGA C'ship: T47: 2002
- U.S. Women's Open: T21: 2000
- du Maurier Classic: T30: 1997
- Women's British Open: T26: 2006

Jackie Gallagher-Smith (born December 11, 1967) is an American professional golfer who played on the LPGA Tour.

Gallagher-Smith has won once on the LPGA Tour in 1999.

Gallagher-Smith's brother, Jim Gallagher Jr., has won on the PGA Tour, making them one of two brother/sister pairs (the other is Billy Kratzert and Cathy Gerring) to win on both tours. Her brother, Jeff Gallagher, has won twice on the Nationwide Tour.

== Personal life ==
In 2005, a former caddie, Gary Robinson filed a suit claiming that the golfer had used him as an "unwitting sperm donor" to get pregnant. Robinson started caddying for Gallagher-Smith in early 2004 and later they entered into a sexual relationship. Robinson claimed that she told him she and her husband had been unsuccessful in conceiving a child. In July, Robinson claimed that she told him she was pregnant, leading him to believe he was the father. He eventually dropped the lawsuit.

== Professional wins ==
=== LPGA Tour wins (1) ===
No.	Date	Tournament	Winning score	Margin of victory	Runner-up
1	Jul 25, 1999	Giant Eagle LPGA Classic	–17 (66-68-65=199)	3 strokes	(New Zealand) Marnie McGuire
