= Sherri Steinhauer =

American professional golfer (born 1962)

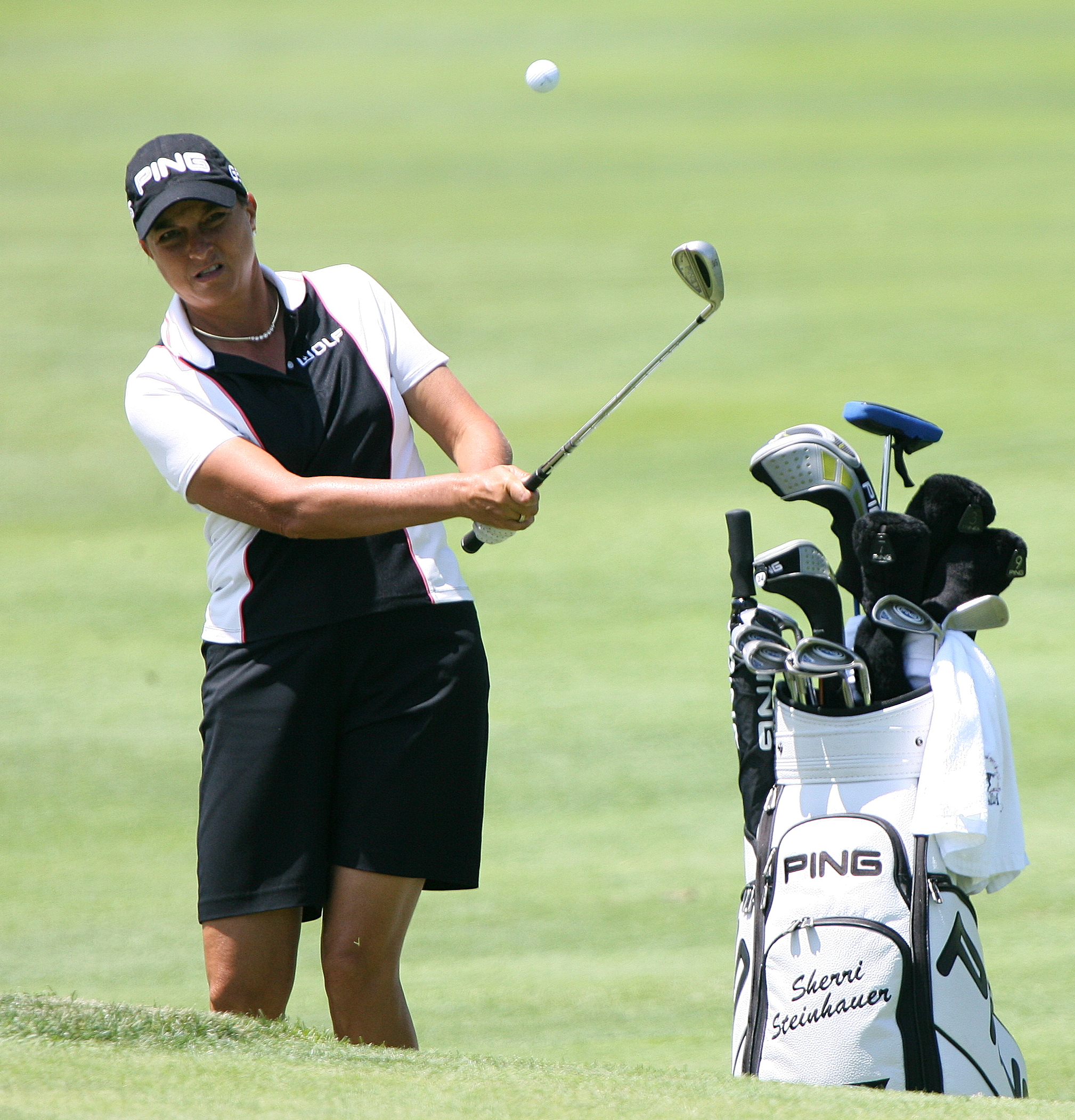
- Steinhauer at the 2007 LPGA Championship

Personal information
- Full name: Sherri Steinhauer
- Nationality: United States
- Born: December 27, 1962 (age 63) Madison, Wisconsin, U.S.
- Height: 5 ft 7 in (1.70 m)

Career
- Sport: Golf
- College: University of Texas
- Turned professional: 1985
- Current tour: Legends Tour (joined 2009)
- Former tours: LPGA Tour (joined 1986); Futures Tour (joined 1985)
- Professional wins: 10

Number of wins by tour
- LPGA Tour: 8
- Ladies European Tour: 3
- Other: 2

Best results in LPGA major championships (wins: 2)
- Chevron Championship: T6: 1992
- Women's PGA C'ship: T4: 1997
- U.S. Women's Open: T13: 1993
- du Maurier Classic: Won: 1992
- Women's British Open: Won: 2006

Achievements and awards
- Wisconsin Golf Hall of Fame: 2004
- Wisconsin Athletic Hall of Fame: 2017

Sherri Steinhauer (born December 27, 1962) is an American professional golfer. She retired from the LPGA Tour in 2012 after a 26-year career. She now plays on the Legends Tour.

== Early life and amateur career ==
In 1962, Steinhauer was born in Madison, Wisconsin. She attended The University of Texas at Austin.

== Professional career ==
In 1985, she turned pro. Her rookie season on the LPGA Tour was 1986. She has won eight tournaments on the Tour during her career, including two major championships, the 1992 du Maurier Classic and 2006 Women's British Open (she also has two, 1998 and 1999, titles recognized by the Ladies European Tour as majors but not by the LPGA Tour).

Steinhauer finished as high as seventh on the money list twice. The first time came in 1994 where Steinhauer won the Sprint Championship in addition to having seven other top 10 finishes. Steinhauer also qualified for the Solheim Cup for the first time in 1994. She would also make the team in 1998, 2000, and 2007.

With wins at the Japan Airlines Big Apple Classic and the Weetabix Women's British Open, Steinhauer finished seventh on the money list again in 1999. She also took part that year in a six-player sudden-playoff at the Jamie Farr Kroger Classic in which Se Ri Pak defeated Steinhauer, Karrie Webb, Carin Koch, Mardi Lunn, and Kelli Kuehne. It was the largest playoff in LPGA Tour history.

Steinhauer was a student of golf instructor Manuel de la Torre.

=== Senior career ===
On March 31, 2009, Steinhauer announced that she would not compete in 2009 while recovering from surgery in mid-February on one hip and preparing for similar surgery on the other hip to be performed in May. She returned to the Tour in 2010.

During this era she began competing on the Legends Tour. In 2009, she won the Legends Tour Open Championship. In 2013, she won the Wendy's Charity Challenge.

Steinhauer announced her retirement from the regular tour after missing the cut at the 2011 Canadian Women's Open. She returned in 2012 at the Kia Classic and also played that year in the Kraft Nabisco Championship. She was eligible to participate in the 2018 U.S. Senior Women's Open on account of her major wins.

Steinhauer was one of two assistant captains for the United States 2011 Solheim Cup team.

== Professional wins (10) ==
=== LPGA Tour wins (8) ===
Legend
LPGA Tour major championships (2)
Other LPGA Tour (6)

No.	Date	Tournament	Winning score	Margin of victory	Runner(s)-up
1	Aug 16, 1992	du Maurier Classic	−11 (67-73-67-70=277)	3 strokes	(United States) Judy Dickinson
2	May 1, 1994	Sprint Championship	−15 (68-68-67-70=273)	1 stroke	(United States) Kelly Robbins
3	Aug 16, 1998	Women's British Open^{[1]}	+4 (81-72-70-69=292)	1 stroke	(United States) Brandie Burton (Sweden) Sophie Gustafson
4	Jul 18, 1999	Japan Airlines Big Apple Classic	−11 (68-66-72=273)	Playoff	(Canada) Lorie Kane
5	Aug 12, 1999	Women's British Open^{[1]}	−9 (70-72-68-73=283)	1 stroke	(Sweden) Annika Sörenstam
6	Mar 23, 2004	Sybase Classic	−12 (67-70-66-69=272)	2 strokes	(South Korea) Grace Park
7	Aug 6, 2006	Women's British Open^{[1]}	−7 (73-70-66-72=281)	3 strokes	(Sweden) Sophie Gustafson (United States) Cristie Kerr
8	Sep 2, 2007	LPGA State Farm Classic	−17 (67-66-71-67=271)	1 stroke	(United States) Christina Kim

^{1} Co-sanctioned by the Ladies European Tour.

LPGA Tour playoff record (1–1)

No.	Year	Tournament	Opponent(s)	Result
1	1999	Jamie Farr Kroger Classic	(Sweden) Carin Koch (United States) Kelli Kuehne (Australia) Mardi Lunn (South Korea) Se Ri Pak (Australia) Karrie Webb	Pak won with birdie on first extra hole
2	1999	Japan Airlines Big Apple Classic	(Canada) Lori Kane	Won with birdie on fifth extra hole

=== Legends Tour wins (2) ===
- 2009 Legends Tour Open Championship
- 2013 Wendy's Charity Challenge

== Major championships ==
=== Wins (2) ===
Year	Championship	Winning score	Margin	Runner(s)-up
1992	du Maurier Classic	−11 (67-73-67-70=277)	2 strokes	(United States) Judy Dickinson
2006	Women's British Open	−7 (73-70-66-72=281)	3 strokes	(Sweden) Sophie Gustafson, (United States) Cristie Kerr

=== Results timeline ===
Tournament	1983	1984	1985	1986	1987	1988	1989
Kraft Nabisco Championship						CUT	T36
LPGA Championship				CUT	T50	CUT	T51
U.S. Women's Open	T40LA		CUT			CUT	
du Maurier Classic				CUT	T31	T13	CUT

Tournament	1990	1991	1992	1993	1994	1995	1996	1997	1998	1999	2000
Kraft Nabisco Championship		T17	T6	T31	T32	T16	CUT	T48	T9	T10	T17
LPGA Championship	T36	T11	T44	CUT	T7	CUT	T18	T4	T37	T19	T40
U.S. Women's Open	CUT	CUT	T36	T13	T22	CUT	T36	CUT	CUT	T25	CUT
du Maurier Classic	T19	T44	1	T10	T11		WD	T24	T9	T34	CUT

Tournament	2001	2002	2003	2004	2005	2006	2007	2008	2009
Kraft Nabisco Championship	CUT	T36	CUT	T48	T23	T35	T20	CUT	
LPGA Championship	CUT	CUT	CUT	T23	CUT	T16	T56	T46	
U.S. Women's Open	T50	T51	CUT	T32	CUT	T24	T25	T38	
Women's British Open ^	CUT	CUT	CUT	T42	T39	1	T23	T64	

Tournament	2010	2011	2012
Kraft Nabisco Championship	T67	CUT	CUT
LPGA Championship	T54	T75	
U.S. Women's Open	T52	70	
Women's British Open	T50	CUT	

^ The Women's British Open replaced the du Maurier Classic as an LPGA major in 2001.

Win
Top 10
Did not play

LA = low amateur
CUT = missed the half-way cut
"T" = tied

=== Summary ===
Tournament	Wins	2nd	3rd	Top-5	Top-10	Top-25	Events	Cuts made
Kraft Nabisco Championship	0	0	0	0	3	8	23	16
LPGA Championship	0	0	0	1	2	7	25	17
U.S. Women's Open	0	0	0	0	0	5	24	14
du Maurier Classic	1	0	0	1	3	7	14	9
Women's British Open	1	0	0	1	1	2	10	6
Totals	2	0	0	3	9	29	96	62

- Most consecutive cuts made – 9 (2005 British – 2007 British)
- Longest streak of top-10s – 2 (1998 du Maurier Classic – 1999 Nabisco Dinah Shore)

== Team appearances ==
Professional

- Solheim Cup (representing the United States): 1994 (winners), 1998 (winners), 2000, 2007 (winners)
- Lexus Cup (representing International team): 2006
- Handa Cup (representing the United States): 2010 (winners), 2011 (winners), 2012 (tie, Cup retained), 2014 (winners)
