= Chloe Williams (golfer) =

Welsh professional golfer (born 1995)

Personal information
- Nationality: Wales
- Born: 21 March 1995 (age 31)
- Height: 5 ft 4 in (163 cm)

Career
- Sport: Golf
- Turned professional: 2016
- Current tour: Ladies European Tour (joined 2020)
- Former tour: LET Access Series (joined 2017)

Best results in LPGA major championships
- Chevron Championship: DNP
- Women's PGA C'ship: DNP
- U.S. Women's Open: DNP
- Women's British Open: CUT: 2021, 2023, 2026
- Evian Championship: DNP

Chloe Williams (born 21 March 1995) is a Welsh professional golfer who plays on the Ladies European Tour.

== Early life and amateur career ==
Williams, from Wrexham and educated at Ysgol Morgan Llwyd, has a father that is a golf teaching professional and her coach. He introduced her to golf at the age of 2, and from the age of 14 she concentrated on golf.

Williams had a successful amateur career and represented Wales at the Women's Home Internationals, the European Girls' Team Championship, the European Ladies' Team Championship, and the Espirito Santo Trophy. She also represented Europe in the Patsy Hankins Trophy, and Great Britain & Ireland in the Astor Trophy, the Junior Vagliano Trophy and the 2015 Vagliano Trophy, where she won 2 of her 4 matches.

Individually, she was runner-up at the 2016 Ladies' British Open Amateur Stroke Play Championship and at the Welsh Ladies' Amateur Championship in 2013 and 2015. She finished 3rd at the 2016 Irish Women's Open Strokeplay, tied 3rd at the 2012 Spanish Ladies Amateur, and tied 3rd at the 2014 Ladies' British Open Amateur Stroke Play Championship, four strokes behind winner Meghan MacLaren.

She won two medals at the 2013 Australian Youth Olympic Festival, gold for Team GB with Georgia Hall in the team event, and bronze individually.

By 2015, she was the number one amateur in Wales.

== Professional career ==
Williams turned professional in 2016 and joined the LET Access Series in 2017. She finished runner-up in her first start, at the Azores Ladies Open, 2 strokes behind Meghan MacLaren.

In the 2019 LET Access Series, she played in 19 tournaments and recorded five top-10 finishes including a season-best third-place finish in the season-ending Road To La Largue Final. She finished sixth on the LET Access Series Order of Merit, claiming the fifth and final full card available for the Ladies European Tour (LET) in 2020.

In her rookie season on the LET, she made the cut in all eight appearances, and finished 46th on the Race to Costa del Sol. Her season-best finish was T15 at the VP Bank Swiss Ladies Open.

In 2021, her second LET season, Williams played in 18 LET events and ended the year 34th on the Race to Costa del Sol. She recorded three top-10 finishes in individual events, at the Ladies Italian Open (T4), the Aramco Team Series - London (T8), and at the VP Bank Swiss Ladies Open (T7). She led the Creekhouse Ladies Open in Sweden by two strokes after a first round 66. She made her first major appearance at the 2021 Women's British Open at Carnoustie Golf Links thanks to her Race to Costa del Sol rank.

In 2022, she finished 50th on the Race to Costa del Sol. At the Aramco Team Series – Bangkok she was captured on camera falling backwards off the 6th tee box into an advertising display, as she was lining up her shot. Ending up on her back with her legs and club dangling in the air, she was not hurt and went on to make par, despite her playing partners' hysterical laughter. It was the unexpected highlight of the week and one of the funniest and most memorable moments of the 2022 LET season, according to media outlets.

== Team appearances ==
Amateur

- European Young Masters (representing Wales): 2011
- Junior Vagliano Trophy (representing Great Britain & Ireland): 2011
- Women's Home Internationals (representing Wales): 2011, 2012, 2013 (winners), 2014, 2015, 2016
- Espirito Santo Trophy (representing Wales): 2012, 2014, 2016
- European Girls' Team Championship (representing Wales): 2009, 2010, 2012
- European Ladies' Team Championship (representing Wales): 2011, 2013, 2014, 2015, 2016
- Vagliano Trophy (representing Great Britain & Ireland): 2015
- Astor Trophy (representing Great Britain & Ireland): 2015
- Patsy Hankins Trophy (representing Europe): 2016
