= 2023 Ladies European Tour =

Professional women's golf tour

2023 Ladies European Tour season
- Duration: February 2023 – November 26, 2023
- Number of official events: 29
- Most wins: 2 (tie): (India) Aditi Ashok (France) Céline Boutier (Germany) Alexandra Försterling
- Order of Merit: (Thailand) Trichat Cheenglab
- Player of the Year: (Sweden) Johanna Gustavsson
- Rookie of the Year: (Thailand) Trichat Cheenglab
- Lowest stroke average: (France) Céline Boutier

The 2023 Ladies European Tour is a series of golf tournaments for elite female golfers from around the world. The tournaments are sanctioned by the Ladies European Tour (LET).

== Changes for 2023 ==
=== Purses ===
The prize money for the Aramco Saudi Ladies International underwent a significant five-fold increase from US$1m to US$5m, matching the men's Saudi International on the Asian Tour, making the purse the third largest on the LET, offering $750,000 to the tournament champion.

=== Tournaments ===
The Lalla Meryem Cup returned to the schedule after a three-year hiatus due to the pandemic.

== Schedule ==
The table below shows part of the 2023 schedule.

The numbers in brackets after the winners' names indicate the career wins on the Ladies European Tour, including that event, and is only shown for members of the tour.

Key

Major championships
Regular events
Flagship events
Team championships

| Date | Tournament | Location | Winner | WWGR points | Purse (€) | Notes |
|---|---|---|---|---|---|---|
| 5 Feb | Magical Kenya Ladies Open | Kenya | (India) Aditi Ashok (4) | 8 | 300,000 | |
| 11 Feb | Lalla Meryem Cup | Morocco | (Sweden) Maja Stark (6) | 16 | 450,000 | |
| 19 Feb | Aramco Saudi Ladies International | Saudi Arabia | (New Zealand) Lydia Ko (7) | 46 | $5,000,000 | |
| 4 Mar | Joburg Ladies Open | South Africa | (England) Lily May Humphreys (1) | 10 | 300,000 | Co-sanctioned with the Sunshine Ladies Tour |
| 11 Mar | Investec South African Women's Open | South Africa | (South Africa) Ashleigh Buhai (5) | 14 | $320,000 | Co-sanctioned with the Sunshine Ladies Tour |
| 19 Mar | Aramco Team Series – Singapore | Singapore | (France) Pauline Roussin (2) | 18.5 | $500,000 | Aramco Team Series individual event |
| 13 May | Jabra Ladies Open | France | (Sweden) Linn Grant (5) | 14 | 300,000 | |
| 21 May | Aramco Team Series – Florida | United States | (Spain) Carlota Ciganda (7) | 19 | $500,000 | Aramco Team Series individual event |
| 28 May | The Mithra Belgian Ladies Open | Belgium | (Germany) Patricia Isabel Schmidt (1) | 10 | 300,000 | |
| 4 Jun | Helsingborg Open | Sweden | (Sweden) Lisa Pettersson (1) | 8 | 300,000 | |
| 11 Jun | Volvo Car Scandinavian Mixed | Sweden | (Netherlands) Anne van Dam (n/a) (Note: Finished tied for third overall; for World Ranking, she is credited with first-place points as it is based among the women only.) low woman | 15.5 | $2,000,000 | Co-sanctioned with the European Tour (Note: World ranking points based on finish among ladies' field only.) |
| 18 Jun | Amundi German Masters | Germany | (Czech Republic) Kristýna Napoleaová (1) | 12 | 300,000 | |
| 25 Jun | Tipsport Czech Ladies Open | Czech Republic | (India) Diksha Dagar (2) | 10 | 300,000 | |
| 1 Jul | Ladies Finnish Open | Finland | (Spain) Carmen Alonso (1) | 8 | 300,000 | |
| 16 Jul | Aramco Team Series – London | England | (United States) Nelly Korda (3) | 18.5 | $500,000 | Aramco Team Series individual event |
| 23 Jul | La Sella Open | Spain | (Spain) Nuria Iturrioz (4) | 15 | 1,000,000 | |
| 30 Jul | Amundi Evian Championship | France | (France) Céline Boutier (4) | 100 | $6,500,000 | Co-sanctioned with the LPGA Tour |
| 6 Aug | FreeD Group Women's Scottish Open | Scotland | (France) Céline Boutier (5) | 46 | $2,000,000 | Co-sanctioned with the LPGA Tour |
| 13 Aug | AIG Women's Open | England | (United States) Lilia Vu (n/a) | 100 | $7,300,000 | Co-sanctioned with the LPGA Tour |
| 20 Aug | ISPS Handa World Invitational | Northern Ireland | (United States) Alexa Pano (n/a) | 17.5 | $1,500,000 | Women's event co-sanctioned with the LPGA Tour |
| 3 Sep | KPMG Women's Irish Open | Ireland | (Denmark) Smilla Tarning Sønderby (1) | 14 | 400,000 | |
| 10 Sep | Big Green Egg Open | Netherlands | (Thailand) Trichat Cheenglab (1) | 12 | 300,000 | |
| 17 Sep | VP Bank Swiss Ladies Open | Switzerland | (Germany) Alexandra Försterling (1) | 8 | 300,000 | |
| 30 Sep | Lacoste Ladies Open de France | France | (Sweden) Johanna Gustavsson (1) | 14 | 350,000 | |
| 8 Oct | Aramco Team Series – Hong Kong | Hong Kong | (China) Lin Xiyu (3) | 19 | $500,000 | Aramco Team Series individual event |
| 22 Oct | Hero Women's Indian Open | India | (Germany) Aline Krauter (1) | 8 | 400,000 | |
| 29 Oct | Aramco Team Series – Riyadh | Saudi Arabia | (United States) Alison Lee (n/a) | 19.5 | $500,000 | Aramco Team Series individual event |
| 18 Nov | Mallorca Ladies Open | Spain | (Germany) Alexandra Försterling (2) | 12 | 400,000 | |
| 26 Nov | Andalucia Costa Del Sol Open De España | Spain | (India) Aditi Ashok (5) | 18 | 650,000 | |

=== Unofficial events ===
The following team events appear on the schedule, but do not carry ranking points.

| Date | Tournament | Host country | Winners | Purse ($) | Notes |
|---|---|---|---|---|---|
| 19 Mar | Aramco Team Series – Singapore | Singapore | (Austria) Christine Wolf (c) (South Africa) Casandra Alexander (England) Eleanor Givens (Japan) Katsuko Blalock (a) | 500,000 | Aramco Team Series team event |
| 20 May | Aramco Team Series – Florida | United States | (France) Pauline Roussin (c) (Spain) Nuria Iturrioz (England) Trish Johnson (United States) Michael Bickford (a) | 500,000 | Aramco Team Series team event |
| 15 Jul | Aramco Team Series – London | England | (England) Georgia Hall (c) (Scotland) Kylie Henry (Wales) Lea-Anne Bramwell (England) Michael Austick (a) | 500,000 | Aramco Team Series team event |
| 24 Sep | Solheim Cup | Spain | Europe | – | |
| 7 Oct | Aramco Team Series – Hong Kong | Hong Kong | (Czech Republic) Kristýna Napoleaová (c) (Germany) Laura Fünfstück (Argentina) Magdalena Simmermacher (South Korea) John Hyun (a) | 500,000 | Aramco Team Series team event |
| 4 Nov | Aramco Team Series – Riyadh | Saudi Arabia | (Spain) Carlota Ciganda (c) (Czech Republic) Sára Kousková (Italy) Alessandra Fanali (Saudi Arabia) Lujain Khalil (a) | 500,000 | Aramco Team Series team event |

== Order of Merit rankings ==
The top 10 players in the Race to Costa del Sol Rankings.

| Rank | Player | Country | Points |
|---|---|---|---|
| 1 | Trichat Cheenglab | Thailand | 1,967 |
| 2 | Céline Boutier | France | 1,876 |
| 3 | Diksha Dagar | India | 1,825 |
| 4 | Aditi Ashok | India | 1,809 |
| 5 | Ana Peláez | Spain | 1,759 |
| 6 | Anne van Dam | Netherlands | 1,756 |
| 7 | Johanna Gustavsson | Sweden | 1,679 |
| 8 | Alexandra Försterling | Germany | 1,588 |
| 9 | Linn Grant | Sweden | 1,439 |
| 10 | Klára Spilková | Czech Republic | 1,306 |

== Location of tournaments ==
Location of tournaments in Europe.
Major championship
National open
Regular event
Aramco Team Series
Solheim Cup
Location of tournaments outside Europe.
National open
Regular event
Aramco Team Series

== See also ==
- 2023 LPGA Tour
- 2023 LET Access Series
