= 2024 Ladies European Tour =

Professional women's golf tour

2024 Ladies European Tour season
- Duration: February 2024 – December 2024
- Number of official events: 30 (1 cancelled)
- Most wins: (Switzerland) Chiara Tamburlini (3)
- Order of Merit: (Switzerland) Chiara Tamburlini
- Player of the Year: (Switzerland) Chiara Tamburlini
- Rookie of the Year: (Switzerland) Chiara Tamburlini
- Lowest stroke average: (Germany) Helen Briem

The 2024 Ladies European Tour is a series of golf tournaments for elite female golfers from around the world. The tournaments are sanctioned by the Ladies European Tour (LET).

== Changes for 2024 ==
=== Tournaments ===
The Australian swing with Women's NSW Open and Australian Women's Classic returned after a one-year hiatus, while the ISPS Handa World Invitational in Northern Ireland, co-sanctioned with the LPGA Tour, was removed from the schedule after three seasons.

The Belgian Ladies Open, Ladies Finnish Open and La Sella Open in Spain were not part of the schedule at the time of announcement, but the schedule included two potential events in Europe in June and September. The La Sella Open was later confirmed for the September slot and the Ladies Italian Open for June. In September, the Wistron Ladies Open was added while the Mallorca Ladies Open was cancelled due to lack of sponsors.

=== Purses ===
The prize money for the Aramco Saudi Ladies International remained at US$5m, matching the men's Saudi International on the Asian Tour, making the purse the third largest on the LET, after the majors.

== Schedule ==
The table below shows the official 2024 schedule.

The numbers in brackets after the winners' names indicate the career wins on the Ladies European Tour, including that event, and is only shown for members of the tour.

Key

Major championships
Regular events
Flagship events
Team championships

Date	Tournament	Location	Winner	WWGR points	Purse (€)	Notes
11 Feb	Magical Kenya Ladies Open	Kenya	(Singapore) Shannon Tan (1)	10	300,000	
18 Feb	Aramco Saudi Ladies International	Saudi Arabia	(Thailand) Patty Tavatanakit (1)	28	$5,000,000	
24 Feb	Lalla Meryem Cup	Morocco	(England) Bronte Law (3)	15.5	450,000	In association with Trophée Hassan II on the PGA Tour Champions
10 Mar	Aramco Team Series – Tampa	United States	(Germany) Alexandra Försterling (3)	18.5	$500,000	Aramco Team Series individual event
31 Mar	Women's NSW Open	Australia	(Colombia) Mariajo Uribe (1)	12	300,000	Co-sanctioned with the WPGA Tour of Australasia
7 Apr	Australian Women's Classic	Australia	(Denmark) Nicole Broch Estrup (Taiwan) Tsai Pei-ying (Australia) Jess Whitting	–	300,000	Co-sanctioned with the WPGA Tour of Australasia; Classified as unofficial following early termination (Note: Reduced to 18 holes due to heavy rainfall causing the course to be unplayable. Win and money unofficial, and no points allocated towards the Order of Merit.)
21 Apr	Joburg Ladies Open	South Africa	(Switzerland) Chiara Tamburlini (1)	8	300,000	Co-sanctioned with the Sunshine Ladies Tour
28 Apr	Investec South African Women's Open	South Africa	(Belgium) Manon De Roey (2)	8	320,000	Co-sanctioned with the Sunshine Ladies Tour
12 May	Aramco Team Series – Korea	South Korea	(South Korea) Kim Hyo-joo (n/a)	16.5	$500,000	Aramco Team Series individual event
19 May	Amundi German Masters	Germany	(Germany) Alexandra Försterling (4)	12	300,000	
25 May	Jabra Ladies Open	France	(Switzerland) Morgane Métraux (2)	14	300,000	
2 Jun	Dormy Open Helsingborg	Sweden	(France) Perrine Delacour (1)	12	300,000	
9 Jun	Volvo Car Scandinavian Mixed	Sweden	(Sweden) Linn Grant (6)	15	$2,000,000	Co-sanctioned with the European Tour (Note: World ranking points based on finish among ladies' field only.)
16 Jun	Ladies Italian Open	Italy	(England) Amy Taylor (1)	12	300,000	
23 Jun	Tipsport Czech Ladies Open	Czech Republic	(Spain) Marta Martín (1)	10	300,000	
30 Jun	VP Bank Swiss Ladies Open	Switzerland	(England) Alice Hewson (2)	6	300,000	
5 Jul	Aramco Team Series – London	England	(Republic of Ireland) Leona Maguire (1)	18	$500,000	Aramco Team Series individual event
14 Jul	Amundi Evian Championship	France	(Japan) Ayaka Furue (2)	100	$6,500,000	Co-sanctioned with the LPGA Tour
21 Jul	Dutch Ladies Open	Netherlands	(Czech Republic) Jana Melichová (2)	10	300,000	
18 Aug	Women's Scottish Open	Scotland	(United States) Lauren Coughlin (n/a)	53	$2,000,000	Co-sanctioned with the LPGA Tour
25 Aug	AIG Women's Open	Scotland	(New Zealand) Lydia Ko (8)	100	$9,000,000	Co-sanctioned with the LPGA Tour
1 Sep	KPMG Women's Irish Open	Ireland	(England) Annabel Dimmock (2)	15.5	400,000	
22 Sep	La Sella Open	Spain	(Germany) Helen Briem (1)	15	1,000,000	
28 Sep	Lacoste Ladies Open de France	France	(Switzerland) Chiara Tamburlini (2)	10	375,000	
6 Oct	Aramco Team Series – Shenzhen	China	(France) Céline Boutier (6)	18.5	$500,000	Aramco Team Series individual event
13 Oct	Wistron Ladies Open	Taiwan	(Switzerland) Chiara Tamburlini (3)	12	$1,000,000	
27 Oct	Hero Women's Indian Open	India	(England) Liz Young (2)	10	400,000	
3 Nov	Aramco Team Series – Riyadh	Saudi Arabia	(England) Charley Hull (4)	17.5	$500,000	Aramco Team Series individual event
~~23 Nov~~	Mallorca Ladies Open	Spain	Tournament cancelled		~~410,000~~	
1 Dec	Andalucia Costa Del Sol Open De España	Spain	(Spain) Carlota Ciganda (8)	15	700,000	

=== Unofficial events ===
The following events appear on the schedule, but do not carry official money or ranking points.

Date	Tournament	Host country	Winner(s)	WWGR points	Purse ($)	Notes
10 Mar	Aramco Team Series – Tampa	United States	(France) Pauline Roussin (c) (France) Céline Herbin (England) Meghan MacLaren (Saudi Arabia) LuJain Omar Khalil (a)	–	500,000	Aramco Team Series team event
12 May	Aramco Team Series – Korea	South Korea	(United States) Danielle Kang (c) (England) Lily May Humphreys (China) Tian Xiaolin (South Korea) Lee Kyu-ho (a)	–	500,000	Aramco Team Series team event
5 Jul	Aramco Team Series – London	England	(France) Nastasia Nadaud (c) (Czech Republic) Kristýna Napoleaová (Spain) Mireia Prat (England) George Brooksbank (a)	–	500,000	Aramco Team Series team event
11 Aug	Olympic women's golf competition	France	(New Zealand) Lydia Ko	37	–	
15 Sep	Solheim Cup	United States	United States	–	–	
6 Oct	Aramco Team Series – Shenzhen	China	(Switzerland) Chiara Tamburlini (c) (South Africa) Lee-Anne Pace (China) Lin Qianhui (China) Peng Yanxuan (a)	–	500,000	Aramco Team Series team event
3 Nov	Aramco Team Series – Riyadh	Saudi Arabia	(Switzerland) Chiara Tamburlini (c) (England) Mimi Rhodes (France) Anne-Charlotte Mora (China) Tenniel Chu (a)	–	500,000	Aramco Team Series team event

== Location of tournaments ==
Location of tournaments in Europe.
Major championship
National open
Regular event
PIF Global Series
Olympics
Location of tournaments outside Europe.
National open
Regular event
PIF Global Series
Solheim Cup

== Order of Merit rankings ==
The top 10 players in the final rankings.

Rank	Player	Country	Points
1	Chiara Tamburlini	Switzerland	2,719
2	Manon De Roey	Belgium	2,216
3	Charley Hull	England	1,742
4	Pauline Roussin-Bouchard	France	1,529
5	Bronte Law	England	1,472
6	Shannon Tan	Singapore	1,444
7	Alice Hewson	England	1,414
8	Maria Hernandez	Spain	1,257
9	Nicole Broch Estrup	Denmark	1,241
10	Alexandra Försterling	Germany	1,208

== See also ==
- 2024 LPGA Tour
- 2024 LET Access Series
