= Manon Gidali =

French professional golfer

Personal information
- Nationality: France
- Born: 15 October 1993 (age 33) Paris, France
- Height: 5 ft 4 in (1.63 m)

Career
- Sport: Golf
- College: University of Arizona
- Turned professional: 2016
- Current tour: Ladies European Tour
- Former tour: LET Access Series (joined 2016)
- Professional wins: 1

Manon Gidali (born 15 October 1993) is a French professional golfer playing on the Ladies European Tour (LET).

== Amateur career ==
Gidali had a successful amateur career and was runner-up at the 2010 European Ladies Amateur Championship, behind Sophia Popov, and won bronze at the 2010 Espirito Santo Trophy in Buenos Aires. She represented Europe at the Junior Ryder Cup, Junior Solheim Cup and Vagliano Trophy.

In 2011, she won the Trophee des Regions and the Championnat de France Cadet. She was runner-up at the Internationaux de France Juniors Filles behind Madelene Sagström and at the Irish Under 18 Open Stroke Play, behind Perrine Delacour. She was one of five amateurs invited to play the Ladies Swiss Open on the LET, but did not make the cut. In 2012, she was runner-up at the Swiss International Amateur, behind Giulia Molinaro, and runner-up at the Turkish Amateur Open, behind Nicole Broch Larsen.

Gidali was part of the French teams that won the 2011 European Girls' Team Championship in Italy and the 2015 European Ladies' Team Championship in Denmark. She played college golf at University of Arizona from 2011 to 2015 and won three tournaments.

== Professional career ==
Gidali turned professional in 2016 after the LET Q-School, where she finished tied 83rd. She played on the LET Access Series from 2016 to 2018, with one top-10 finish. In 2018, she played in three LET tournaments and made the cut in the Lalla Meryem Cup. She returned to Q-School and finished T7, and in 2019 played in 13 LET tournaments, finishing the season ranked 83rd.

On the 2020 Ladies European Tour, Gidali achieve a career-best 33rd ranking, despite making only nine starts. She tied for fourth in the South African Women's Open, sixth in the Andalucia Costa Del Sol Open De España, and earned a runner-up finish in the Saudi Ladies Team International with Stephanie Kyriacou and Pia Babnik.

In 2021, Gidali holed a 25-foot birdie putt on the first extra hole of the Cape Town Ladies Open to claim her maiden professional victory in the opening event of the 2021 Sunshine Ladies Tour.

== Amateur wins ==
- 2011 Trophee des Regions, Championnat de France Cadet
- 2012 Arizona Wildcat Women's Invitational
- 2013 Dr Donnis Thompson Invitational
- 2015 SunTrust Gator Invitational

== Professional wins (1) ==
=== Sunshine Ladies Tour wins (1) ===
| No. | Date | Tournament | Winning score | To par | Margin of victory | Runner-up |
|---|---|---|---|---|---|---|
| 1 | 9 Apr 2021 | Cape Town Ladies Open | 74-71-73=218 | –4 | Playoff | (South Africa) Cara Gorlei |

== Team appearances ==
Amateur

- European Girls' Team Championship (representing France): 2010 (winners), 2011 (winners)
- Junior Ryder Cup (representing Europe): 2010
- Junior Solheim Cup (representing Europe): 2011 (tie)
- Vagliano Trophy (representing the Continent of Europe): 2011 (winners)
- Espirito Santo Trophy (representing France): 2010, 2014
- European Girls' Team Championship (representing France): 2011 (winners)
- European Ladies' Team Championship (representing France): 2013, 2015 (winners)
