= Alexandra Swayne =

American professional golfer (born 2000)

Personal information
- Nationality: United States Virgin Islands
- Born: April 27, 2000 (age 26) Cincinnati, Ohio, U.S.

Career
- Sport: Golf
- College: Clemson University
- Turned professional: 2022
- Current tour: Ladies European Tour (joined 2022)

Best results in LPGA major championships
- Chevron Championship: DNP
- Women's PGA C'ship: DNP
- U.S. Women's Open: CUT: 2021
- Women's British Open: DNP
- Evian Championship: DNP

Alexandra Swayne (born April 27, 2000) is an American professional golfer representing the United States Virgin Islands. She plays on the Ladies European Tour, where she was part of the team finishing runner-up at the 2022 Aramco Team Series – Jeddah.

== Early life and amateur career ==
Swayne was born in Cincinnati, Ohio and began playing golf at the age of 12. At 15, she won the Drive, Chip & Putt National Championship at Augusta National Golf Club. In 2018, she won the Golfweek Junior Tour Championship and was an AJGA Rolex All-American.

Swayne enrolled at Clemson University in 2018 to play with the Clemson Tigers women's golf team, and graduated after three years in 2021. She became the first golfer at Clemson to qualify for both the U.S. Women's Amateur and U.S. Women's Open in the same year.

== Professional career ==
Swayne turned professional in 2022 and joined the Ladies European Tour, where she has recorded top-10 finishes at the 2022 Joburg Ladies Open and 2024 Jabra Ladies Open. She was runner-up alongside Christine Wolf and Laura Beveridge at the 2022 Aramco Team Series – Jeddah, where they lost the team championship in a playoff to a team captained by Nicole Garcia.

== Amateur wins ==
- 2015 Drive, Chip & Putt National Championship
- 2017 AJGA Junior at Penn State
- 2018 AJGA Junior at Forest Lake, Golfweek Junior Tour Championship
- 2021 Caribbean Amateur Golf Championship

== Results in LPGA majors ==
| ! Tournament | 2021 |
|---|---|
| Chevron Championship | |
| U.S. Women's Open | CUT |
| Women's PGA Championship | |
| The Evian Championship | |
| Women's British Open | |

Did not play

CUT = missed the half-way cut

== Team appearances ==
Professional

- Pan American Games (representing United States Virgin Islands): 2023
