= Marianne Skarpnord =

Norwegian professional golfer

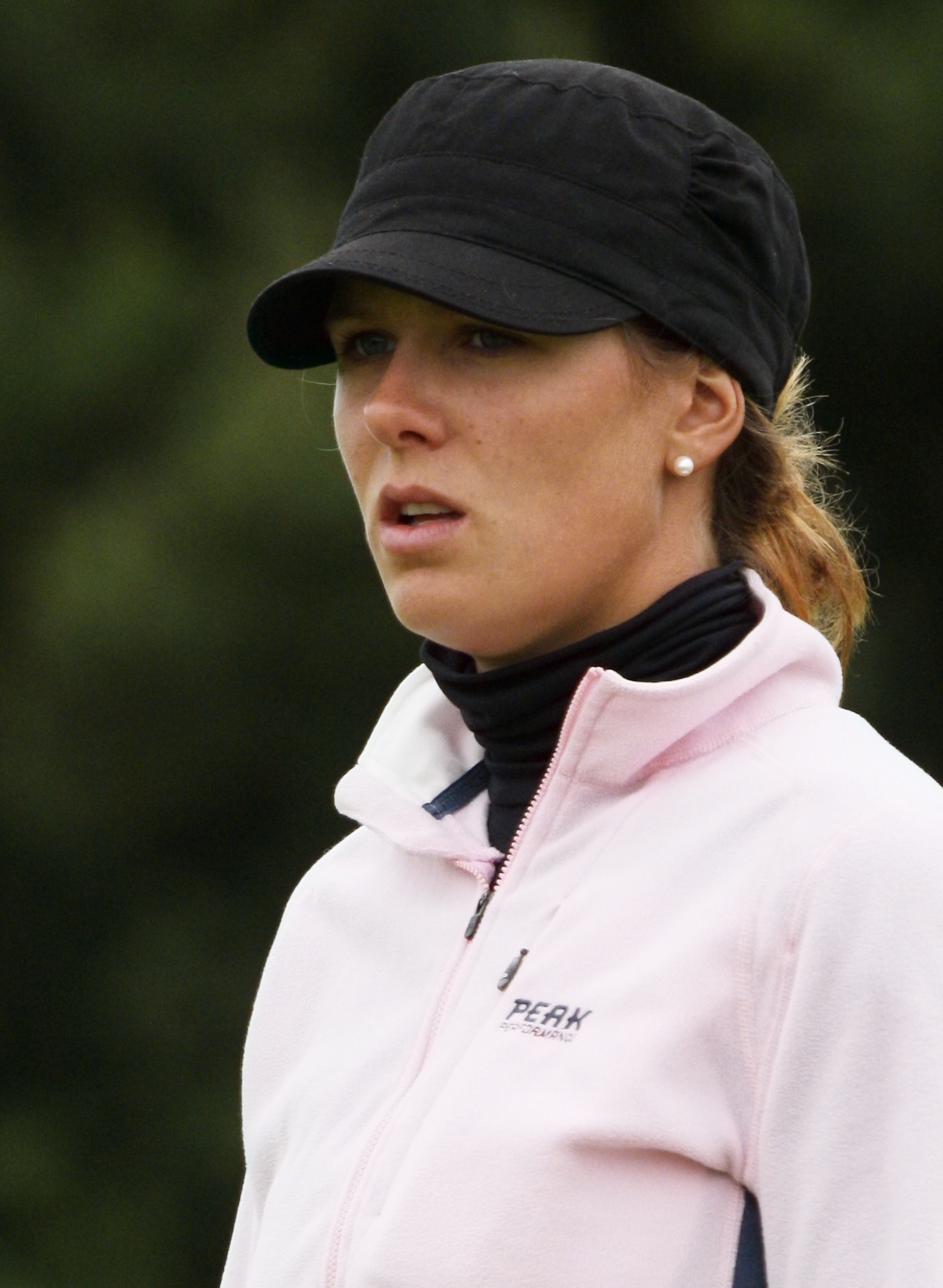
- Skarpnord at the 2009 Ricoh Women's British Open

Personal information
- Nationality: Norway
- Born: 11 February 1986 (age 40) Sarpsborg, Norway
- Height: 1.75 m (5 ft 9 in)

Career
- Sport: Golf
- Turned professional: 2005
- Current tour: Ladies European Tour (joined 2005)
- Former tour: LPGA Tour
- Professional wins: 12

Number of wins by tour
- Ladies European Tour: 5
- WPGA Tour of Australasia: 3
- Other: 5

Best results in LPGA major championships
- Chevron Championship: CUT: 2010
- Women's PGA C'ship: CUT: 2010
- U.S. Women's Open: CUT: 2010, 2020
- Women's British Open: T36: 2013, 2015
- Evian Championship: CUT: 2013, 2019, 2022

Achievements and awards
- Ladies European Tour Player of the Year: 2019

Marianne Skarpnord (born 11 February 1986) is a Norwegian professional golfer playing on the Ladies European Tour.

== Early life and amateur career ==
As a junior, Skarpnord was considered one of the biggest talents in Norwegian golf. In 2003, she won the Girls Amateur Championship, defeating Beatriz Recari of Spain in the final match. She also won the Junior Solheim Cup with Europe the same year. Skarpnord made a six-footer to secure the win for the European team.

In 2004, she finished 3rd in the British Girls Championship.

== Professional career ==
In 2005, Skarpnord turned professional. She finished 12th in the qualifying school for the Ladies European Tour and got her tour card for the 2005 season. That year her best finish was a second place in Skandia PGA Open at the Swedish Telia Tour and her best finish at the Ladies European Tour was 22nd in OTP Bank Ladies Central European Open.

The year after, in 2006, Skarpnord finished 2nd in Rejmes Ladies Open on the Telia Tour. On the Ladies European Tour her best finish was 23rd in the Finnair Masters, and 28th in the SAS Masters.

In 2007, after two difficult years, Skarpnord decided to play a full season at the Telia Tour. She won 3 tournaments that year, and one additional 2nd and three 3rd-place finishes. She won the Order of Merit, and secured her card for the 2008 Ladies European Tour.

In 2008, Skarpnord played 21 tournaments on the Ladies European Tour. She made 18 cuts, and her best finish was a 2nd place in the Ladies Irish Open. She also played four tournaments on the Ladies African Tour early in the season, where she had 3 top 4 finishes and 1 top 10. On the Ladies African Tour order of merit she finished 5th total, and on the Ladies European Tour she finished 16th on the moneylist.

In 2009, was the year Skarpnord got her first win on the Ladies European Tour, defeating Melissa Reid of England by one stroke in the Deutsche Bank Ladies Swiss Open. Her second win came in the Carta Sì Ladies Italian Open, defeating Laura Davies in playoff.

In 2010, Skarpnord qualified for the LPGA Tour after finishing second in the LPGA Final Qualifying Tournament in Daytona, Florida.

== Awards and honors ==
In 2019, she won the Ladies European Tour Player of the Year award.

== Professional wins (12) ==
=== Ladies European Tour wins (5) ===
No.	Date	Tournament	Winning score	To par	Margin of victory	Runner(s)-up
1	17 May 2009	Deutsche Bank Ladies Swiss Open	69-71-66-70=276	−16	1 stroke	(England) Mel Reid
2	17 Oct 2009	Carta Sì Ladies Italian Open	69-67-69=204	−12	Playoff	(England) Laura Davies
3	19 Apr 2013	South African Women's Open^{a}	69	−3	1 stroke	(Finland) Minea Blomqvist (South Africa) Stacy Bregman (South Africa) Ashleigh Buhai (United States) Katie Burnett (Germany) Nina Holleder (England) Charley Hull (Sweden) Camilla Lennarth
4	24 Feb 2019	Australian Ladies Classic^{b}	70-72-69-69=280	−8	2 strokes	(Australia) Hannah Green (Spain) Nuria Iturrioz
5	10 Jul 2021	Aramco Team Series – London	73-65-68=206	−13	Playoff	(Thailand) Atthaya Thitikul

^{a} Reduced to 18 holes due to weather.
^{b} Co-sanctioned by the ALPG Tour.

Ladies European Tour playoff record (2–0)

No.	Year	Tournament	Opponent	Result
1	2009	Carta Sì Ladies Italian Open	(England) Laura Davies	Won with bogey on third extra hole
2	2021	Aramco Team Series – London	(Thailand) Atthaya Thitikul	Won with birdie on second extra hole

=== ALPG Tour wins (3) ===
- 2015 (1) Oates Victorian Open
- 2019 (2) Ballarat Icons ALPG Pro Am, Australian Ladies Classic

=== Sunshine Ladies Tour wins (1) ===
- 2021 (1) Dimension Data Ladies Challenge

=== LET Access Series wins (1) ===
- 2012 (1) Ladies Norwegian Challenge

=== Telia Tour wins (3) ===
- 2007 (3) Felix Finnish Ladies Open, Smådalarö Gård Open, Ekerum Ladies Masters

== Results in LPGA majors ==
Results not in chronological order before 2019.

Tournament	2008	2009	2010	2011	2012	2013	2014	2015	2016	2017	2018	2019	2020	2021	2022
Chevron Championship			CUT												
U.S. Women's Open			CUT										CUT		
Women's PGA Championship			CUT												
The Evian Championship ^						CUT						CUT	NT		CUT
Women's British Open	T64	T42	CUT		CUT	T36	CUT	T36	CUT	CUT	CUT	CUT	CUT	CUT	CUT

^ The Evian Championship was added as a major in 2013.

Did not play

CUT = missed the half-way cut
NT = no tournament
"T" tied

== Ladies European Tour career summary ==
Year	No. events	Cuts made	Wins	2nd	3rd	Top 10s	Best finish	Earnings (€)	Money list rank	Scoring average
2005	14	4	0	0	0	0	T22	6,673.00	121	75.21
2006	7	4	0	0	0	0	T23	6,126.68	127	73.74
2007	3	1	0	0	0	0	T68	450.00	–	76.00
2008	21	18	0	1	0	7	2	125,753.11	16	72.28
2009	17	16	2	0	2	9	1	203,350.38	4	71.54
2010	8	5	0	2	0	3	2	70,280.68	33	73.38
2011	13	10	0	0	0	0	T23	25,577.89	78	72.28
2012	19	17	0	1	0	1	T2			
2013	19	18	0	0	0	1	T6			
2014	17	10	0	0	0	1	T8			
2015	16	14	0	0	0	4	T4			
2016	14	9	0	0	0	1	8	41,258.63	44	72.79
2017	12	9	0	0	0	0	T12	32,157.40	47	72.05
2018	13	11	0	0	0	1	T9	43,023.92	26	72.33
2019	18	–	–	–	–	–	–	174,455.20	5	–
2020	11	–	–	–	–	–	–	50,869.95	20	–
2021	7	–	–	–	–	–	–	37,150.13	9	–

== Team appearances ==
Amateur

- European Girls' Team Championship (representing Norway): 2003, 2004
- Junior Solheim Cup: (representing Europe): 2003 (winners)
- Espirito Santo Trophy (representing Norway): 2002, 2004

Professional

- World Cup (representing Norway): 2007
- The Queens (representing Europe): 2015
- European Championships (representing Norway): 2018
