= 2026 Ladies European Tour =

Professional women's golf tour

2026 Ladies European Tour season
- Duration: 11 February 2026 – 29 November 2026
- Number of official events: 29
- Order of Merit: (South Africa) Casandra Alexander

The 2026 Ladies European Tour is a series of golf tournaments for elite female golfers from around the world. The tournaments are sanctioned by the Ladies European Tour (LET).

== Changes for 2026 ==
The Australian swing was extended to four events with the inclusion of the Women's Australian Open, last featured on the schedule in 2016.

The PIF Global Series discontinued the team element, and the tournament in the United States saw its purse doubled to $4m and co-sanctioned by the LPGA Tour.

The events in Tenerife and Sweden left the schedule, and were replaced by a returning Ladies Italian Open, and a tournament in Mauritius, a country included on the schedule for the first time.

In April, it was announced that Lacoste Ladies Open de France and Jabra Ladies Open would be merged into a single event, the Jabra Ladies Open de France held at Evian Resort Golf Club.

Total purse surpassed €40m for the first time. The 2026 membership consists of 340 active players representing 47 nationalities from six continents, with countries such as Brazil, Slovakia, the Philippines and Malaysia returning to the roster after a hiatus.

== Schedule ==
The table below shows the 2026 schedule.

Key

Major championships
Regular events
Flagship events
Team championships

Date	Tournament	Location	Winner (Note: The numbers in brackets after the winners' names indicate the career wins on the Ladies European Tour, including that event, and is only shown for members of the tour.)	WWGR points	Purse (€)	Other tours (Note: AFR − Sunshine Ladies Tour, LPGA − LPGA Tour, WPGA − WPGA Tour of Australasia, CHN – China LPGA Tour, TLPGA – Taiwan LPGA Tour.)	Notes
14 Feb	PIF Saudi Ladies International	Saudi Arabia	(England) Charley Hull (5)	27.07	$5,000,000		PIF Global Series
1 Mar	Ford Women's NSW Open	Australia	(France) Agathe Laisné (1)	9.00	A$600,000	WPGA	
8 Mar	Australian Women's Classic	Australia	(Australia) Kelsey Bennett (1)	12.40	A$600,000	WPGA	
15 Mar	Women's Australian Open	Australia	(Australia) Hannah Green (1)	18.67	A$1,700,000	WPGA	Last played in 2016
22 Mar	Australian WPGA Championship	Australia	(Australia) Hannah Green (2)	16.30	A$600,000	WPGA	
5 Apr	Aramco Championship	United States	(United States) Lauren Coughlin (n/a)	66.11	$4,000,000	LPGA	PIF Global Series
19 Apr	Joburg Ladies Open	South Africa	(France) Agathe Laisné (2)	10.20	330,000	AFR	
26 Apr	Investec South African Women's Open	South Africa	(England) Esme Hamilton (1)	12.00	350,000	AFR	
3 May	MCB Ladies Classic – Mauritius	Mauritius	(Denmark) Smilla Tarning Sønderby (2)	9.80	400,000	AFR	New tournament
17 May	Amundi German Masters	Germany	(Germany) Leonie Harm (1)	14.30	350,000		
23 May	Lalla Meryem Cup	Morocco	(Canada) Anna Huang (3)	15.10	450,000		
30 May	Jabra Ladies Open de France	France	(Germany) Helen Briem (2)	11.00	450,000		
21 Jun	Dutch Ladies Open	Netherlands	(Thailand) Aunchisa Utama (1)	8.20	350,000		
28 Jun	Tipsport Czech Ladies Open	Czech Republic	(Finland) Noora Komulainen (1)	8.40	350,000		
5 Jul	Hulencourt Women's Open	Belgium	(Spain) Carolina López-Chacarra (1)	9.80	350,000		
12 Jul	Amundi Evian Championship	France	(South Korea) Ryu Hae-ran (n/a)	100	$9,100,000	LPGA	
26 Jul	ISPS Handa Women's Scottish Open	Scotland	(South Korea) Jenny Shin (1)	52.90	$2,000,000	LPGA	
2 Aug	AIG Women's Open	England	(Japan) Shiho Kuwaki (n/a)	100	$10,000,000	LPGA	
9 Aug	PIF London Championship	England	(Canada) Anna Huang (4)	17.20	$2,000,000		PIF Global Series
15 Aug	VP Bank Swiss Ladies Open	Switzerland	(England) Eleanor Givens (1)	6.00	350,000		
30 Aug	KPMG Women's Irish Open	Ireland	(South Africa) Casandra Alexander (2)	14.70	450,000		
20 Sep	La Sella Open	Spain	(England) Charlotte Heath (1)	15.15	1,000,000		
27 Sep	Buccellati Ladies Italian Open	Italy	(South Africa) Casandra Alexander (3)	11.00	350,000		Last played in 2024
11 Oct	Aramco Korea Championship	South Korea	(Japan) Miyū Yamashita (2)	18.30	$2,000,000		PIF Global Series
25 Oct	Hero Women's Indian Open	India	(Thailand) Pornanong Phatlum (3)	7.40	$500,000		
1 Nov	Wistron Ladies Open	Taiwan	(South Africa) Casandra Alexander (4)	14.90	$1,200,000	TLPGA	
8 Nov	Aramco China Championship	China	(Spain) Ana Peláez (2)	15.95	$2,000,000	CHN	PIF Global Series
29 Nov	Andalucia Costa Del Sol Open De España	Spain			700,000		

=== Unofficial events ===
The following event appear on the schedule, but do not carry official money or Order of Merit ranking points.

Date	Tournament	Location	Winners	WWGR points	Purse (€)	Other tours	Notes
13 Sep	Solheim Cup	Netherlands	Europe	–	–	LPGA	Team event

== Location of tournaments ==
Location of tournaments in Europe.
Major championship
National open
Regular event
PIF Global Series
Solheim Cup
Location of tournaments outside Europe.
National open
Regular event
PIF Global Series

== Order of Merit rankings ==
The top players in the Order of Merit rankings following the Wistron Ladies Open.

Rank	Player	Country	Points
1	Casandra Alexander	South Africa	3,456
2	Anna Huang	Canada	1,686
3	Kelsey Bennett	Australia	1,632
4	Alexandra Försterling	Germany	1,598
5	Agathe Laisné	France	1,557
6	Shannon Tan	Singapore	1,496
7	Kajsa Arwefjäll	Sweden	1,450
8	Sára Kousková	Slovenia	1,423
9	Noora Komulainen	Finland	1,176
10	Charley Hull	England	1,155
