= PIF Global Series =

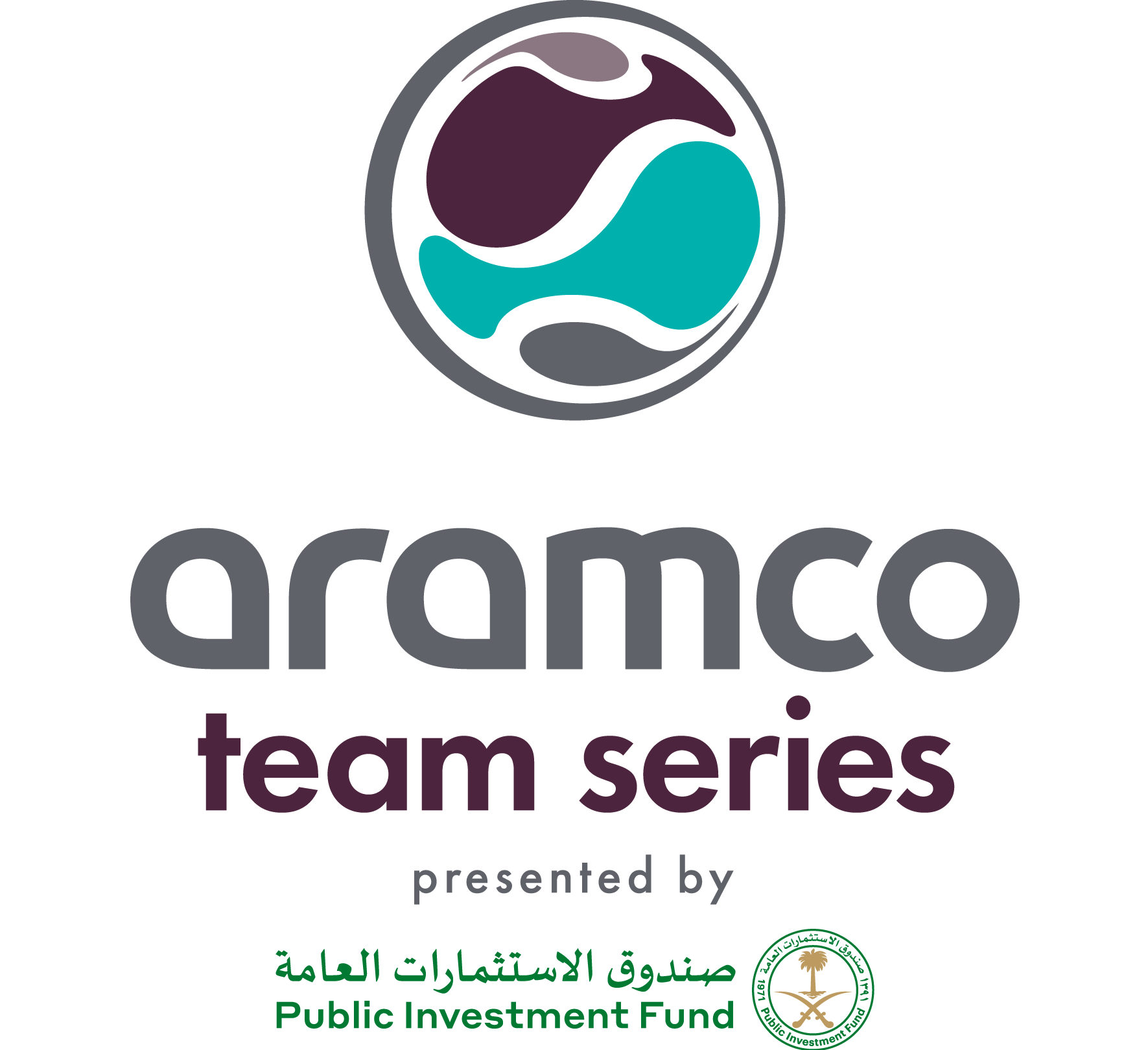

Tournament information
- Established: 2020
- Tour: Ladies European Tour
- Format: Individual and team event
- Prize fund: $2,000,000

Tournament record score
- Aggregate: 187 Alison Lee
- To par: −29 as above

Current champion
- (Canada) Anna Huang

The PIF Global Series, formerly known as the Aramco Team Series, is a professional women's golf competition that is part of the Ladies European Tour (LET), first played in 2020.

The inaugural tournament was played as the Saudi Ladies Team International at Royal Greens Golf & Country Club in King Abdullah Economic City (KAEC) by the Red Sea in Saudi Arabia. It was the penultimate LET event of the 2020 season and followed the Aramco Saudi Ladies International.

2021 saw the competition expanded to become the Aramco Team Series, with four tournaments to be held in the United Kingdom, the United States, Spain and Saudi Arabia, each with a US$1 million prize fund.

It was renamed the PIF Global Series in 2025, and purses doubled to $2m.

== Format ==
The tournament is a team competition with a total of 26 teams (36 in 2020 and 2021), each team consisting of three professionals and one amateur.

A draft is used to form the teams for the tournament. The team captains are seeded based on the official Women's World Golf Rankings. In a random order, the captains select the first additional player to join their team. Each team is then randomly assigned an amateur player and another professional from the remaining field.

Scoring is on a "two-from-four" basis which sees the best two scores on each hole counted for the team competition. With this format, the amateurs may contribute to the result of the game. In addition, the professionals complete every hole and the score is used for the individual competition.

For 2022, the format was amended so that teams compete over only 36 holes, the first two days of the tournament, with the final day exclusively for the 60 and ties who make the cut, to compete for the individual title. Also, instead of an 80/20 split, an equal split of the US$1,000,000 prize between the team and individual events was introduced.

The team element was discontinued following the 2025 season, and the tournaments extended from 54 to 72 holes.

== Winners ==
=== Individual ===
Year	Date	Location	Winner	Score	To Par	Margin of victory	Runner(s)-up	Winner's share ($)
Saudi Ladies Team International
2020	12–15 Nov	KAEC, Saudi Arabia	(Denmark) Emily Kristine Pedersen	202	−14	2 strokes	(Australia) Stephanie Kyriacou (Spain) Luna Sobrón Galmés (Netherlands) Anne van Dam	25,000
Aramco Team Series
2021	8–10 Jul	London, England	(Norway) Marianne Skarpnord	206	−13	Playoff	(Thailand) Atthaya Thitikul	30,000
2021	5–7 Aug	Sotogrande, Spain	(United States) Alison Lee	201	−15	5 strokes	(South Africa) Ashleigh Buhai	30,000
2021	14–16 Oct	New York, U.S.	(England) Charley Hull	204	−12	1 stroke	(United States) Nelly Korda	30,000
2021	10–12 Nov	Jeddah, Saudi Arabia	(Slovenia) Pia Babnik	200	−16	1 stroke	(Germany) Olivia Cowan	30,000
2022	12–14 May	Bangkok, Thailand	(Belgium) Manon De Roey	203	−13	3 strokes	(Sweden) Johanna Gustavsson	75,000
2022	16–18 Jun	London, England	(England) Bronte Law	210	−9	1 stroke	(England) Georgia Hall	75,000
2022	18–20 Aug	Sotogrande, Spain	(United States) Nelly Korda	203	−13	3 strokes	(United States) Jessica Korda (Spain) Ana Peláez (France) Pauline Roussin	75,000
2022	13–15 Oct	New York, U.S.	(United States) Lexi Thompson	205	−11	3 strokes	(Canada) Brooke Henderson (Sweden) Madelene Sagström	75,000
2022	9–11 Nov	Jeddah, Saudi Arabia	(Germany) Chiara Noja	203	−13	Playoff (Note: Noja won with a birdie on the second playoff hole.)	(England) Charley Hull	75,000
2023	16–18 Mar	Singapore	(France) Pauline Roussin	191	−15	4 strokes	(United States) Danielle Kang	75,000
2023	19–21 May	West Palm Beach, Florida, U.S.	(Spain) Carlota Ciganda	214	−2	1 stroke	(Czech Republic) Klára Spilková	75,000
2023	14–16 Jul	London, England	(United States) Nelly Korda	208	−11	4 strokes	(England) Charley Hull	75,000
2023	6–8 Oct	Hong Kong	(China) Lin Xiyu	135 (Note: Reduced to 36 holes due to Typhoon Koinu.)	−11	Playoff (Note: Lin won with a birdie on the second playoff hole.)	(South Korea) Ko Jin-young	75,000
2023	3–5 Nov	Riyadh, Saudi Arabia	(United States) Alison Lee	187	−29	8 strokes	(Spain) Carlota Ciganda	75,000
2024	8–10 Mar	Tampa, Florida, U.S.	(Germany) Alexandra Försterling	204	−12	3 strokes	(England) Charley Hull	75,000
2024	10–12 May	Seoul, South Korea	(South Korea) Kim Hyo-joo	206	−10	3 strokes	(England) Charley Hull	75,000
2024	3–5 Jul	London, England	(Republic of Ireland) Leona Maguire	211	−8	1 stroke	(Spain) María Hernández	75,000
2024	4–6 Oct	Shenzhen, China	(France) Céline Boutier	200	−19	2 strokes	(China) Lin Xiyu	75,000
2024	1–3 Nov	Riyadh, Saudi Arabia	(England) Charley Hull	198	−18	3 strokes	(Denmark) Nicole Broch Estrup	75,000
PIF Global Series
2025	13–15 Feb	Riyadh, Saudi Arabia	(Thailand) Jeeno Thitikul	200	−16	4 strokes	(South Korea) Lee So-mi	675,000
2025	9–11 May	Seoul, South Korea	(South Korea) Kim Hyo-joo	209	−7	2 strokes	(Switzerland) Chiara Tamburlini	225,000
2025	8–10 Aug	London, England	(Germany) Laura Fünfstück	209	−10	1 stroke	(Ecuador) Daniela Darquea	225,000
2025	5–7 Sep	Houston, Texas, U.S.	(Spain) Nuria Iturrioz	203	−13	2 strokes	(Spain) Carlota Ciganda (England) Charley Hull	225,000
2025	6–8 Nov	Shenzhen, China	(China) Ruixin Liu	203	−16	3 strokes	(Thailand) Trichat Cheenglab (China) Lin Qianhui (Switzerland) Chiara Tamburlini (China) Zeng Liqi	225,000
2026	12–14 Feb	Riyadh, Saudi Arabia	(England) Charley Hull	269	−19	1 stroke	(South Africa) Casandra Alexander (Japan) Akie Iwai	750,000
2026	3–5 Apr	Las Vegas, Nevada, U.S. (Note: Played as the Aramco Championship and co-sanctioned by the LPGA Tour)	(United States) Lauren Coughlin	281	−7	5 strokes	(United States) Nelly Korda (Republic of Ireland) Leona Maguire	600,000
2026	7–9 Aug	London, England	(Canada) Anna Huang	270	−22	2 strokes	(England) Charley Hull	300,000
2026	9–11 Oct	Seoul, South Korea	(Japan) Miyū Yamashita	266	−22	3 strokes	(Czech Republic) Sára Kousková	300,000
2026	6–8 Nov	Shenzhen, China	(Spain) Ana Peláez	272	−20	3 strokes	(England) Mimi Rhodes	300,000

=== Team ===
Year	Date	Location	Winners	Score	To par	Margin of victory	Runners-up	Ref
Saudi Ladies Team International
2020	12–15 Nov	KAEC, Saudi Arabia	(Denmark) Emily Kristine Pedersen (c) (South Africa) Casandra Hall (Scotland) Michele Thomson (England) Matt Selby (a)	392	−40	1 stroke	(Belgium) Manon De Roey (c) (England) Eleanor Givens (Denmark) Linette Littau Durr Holmslykke (Egypt) Ahmed El-Mehelmy (a)	
2020	12–15 Nov	KAEC, Saudi Arabia	(Denmark) Emily Kristine Pedersen (c) (South Africa) Casandra Hall (Scotland) Michele Thomson (England) Matt Selby (a)	392	−40	1 stroke	(Australia) Stephanie Kyriacou (c) (Slovenia) Pia Babnik (France) Manon Gidali (United Arab Emirates) Abdulwahed Al Qasem (a)	
Aramco Team Series
2021	8–10 Jul	London, England	(Germany) Olivia Cowan (c) (Germany) Sarina Schmidt (India) Diksha Dagar (England) Andrew Kelsey (a)	397	−41	3 strokes	(Norway) Marianne Skarpnord (c) (Sweden) Frida Gustafsson Spång (Spain) Carmen Alonso (England) Christopher Pinsent (a)	
2021	5–7 Aug	Sotogrande, Spain	(South Africa) Ashleigh Buhai (c) (South Africa) Stacy Lee Bregman (England) Hayley Davis (Spain) Ignacio Morillo (a)	397	−35	Playoff (Note: Team Buhai won with a par on the first playoff hole.)	(Sweden) Linnea Ström (c) (Sweden) Jenny Haglund (France) Agathe Sauzon (Italy) Alessandro Anzelmo (a)	
2021	14–16 Oct	New York, U.S.	(United States) Jessica Korda (c) (Germany) Karolin Lampert (Sweden) Lina Boqvist (United States) Alexandra O'Laughlin (a)	391	−41	Playoff (Note: Team J. Korda won with a par on the second playoff hole.)	(Germany) Sophia Popov (c) (England) Hayley Davis (Argentina) Magdalena Simmermacher (United States) Cody Crowell (a)	
2021	10–12 Nov	Jeddah, Saudi Arabia	(Denmark) Emily Kristine Pedersen (c) (England) Hannah Burke (Finland) Krista Bakker (Saudi Arabia) Ahmed Al Subaey (a)	381	−51	Playoff (Note: Team Pedersen won with an eagle on the second playoff hole.)	(Wales) Lydia Hall (c) (Wales) Becky Brewerton (Brazil) Luiza Altmann (United States) Victor Green (a)	
2022	12–13 May	Bangkok, Thailand	(Australia) Whitney Hillier (c) (Thailand) Chonlada Chayanun (Finland) Krista Bakker (Thailand) Pattanan Amatanon (a)	257	−31	3 strokes	(Argentina) Magdalena Simmermacher (c) (France) Charlotte Liautier (Sweden) Isabella Deilert (Thailand) Sirapob Yapala (a)	
2022	16–17 Jun	London, England	(South Africa) Nicole Garcia (c) (United States) Kelly Whaley (Norway) Madelene Stavnar (England) Mia Baker (a)	265	−27	Playoff (Note: Team Garcia won with a par on the first playoff hole.)	(Finland) Ursula Wikström (c) (Sweden) Julia Engström (Spain) María Hernández (Belgium) Laurent Dhaeyer (a)	
2022	18–19 Aug	Sotogrande, Spain	(United States) Jessica Korda (c) (Finland) Noora Komulainen (Czech Republic) Tereza Melecká (England) Malcolm Borwick (a)	255	−33	1 stroke	(France) Pauline Roussin (c) (Czech Republic) Jana Melichová (Thailand) Mim Sangkapong (Spain) Ana Luisa Hernández (a)	
2022	13–14 Oct	New York, U.S.	(Sweden) Johanna Gustavsson (c) (Sweden) Jessica Karlsson (Germany) Karolin Lampert (United States) Jennifer Rosenberg (a)	264	−24	1 stroke	(United States) Nelly Korda (c) (France) Celine Herbin (Finland) Noora Komulainen (United States) James Rawson (a)	
2022	9–10 Nov	Jeddah, Saudi Arabia	(South Africa) Nicole Garcia (c) (South Africa) Casandra Alexander (Czech Republic) Tereza Melecká (Morocco) Sonia Bayahya (a)	259	−29	Playoff (Note: Team Garcia won with a birdie on the first playoff hole.)	(Austria) Christine Wolf (c) (Scotland) Laura Beveridge (United States Virgin Islands) Alexandra Swayne (Saudi Arabia) Raghdah Alessawi (a)	
2023	16–17 Mar	Singapore	(Austria) Christine Wolf (c) (South Africa) Casandra Alexander (England) Eleanor Givens (Japan) Katsuko Blalock (a)	260	−28	1 stroke	(France) Pauline Roussin (c) (Spain) Nuria Iturrioz (Germany) Patricia Isabel Schmidt (Singapore) Jared Tang (a)	
2023	19–20 May	West Palm Beach, Florida, U.S.	(France) Pauline Roussin (c) (Spain) Nuria Iturrioz (England) Trish Johnson (England) Michael Bickford (a)	263	−25	2 strokes	(South Africa) Casandra Alexander (c) (England) Gabriella Cowley (France) Emma Grechi (United States) Jason McCarty (a)	
2023	14–15 Jul	London, England	(England) Georgia Hall (c) (Scotland) Kylie Henry (Wales) Lea Anne Bramwell (England) Michael Austick (a)	268	−24	1 stroke	(England) Charley Hull (c) (England) Hayley Davis (Sweden) Isabella Deilert (England) Teddy Sheringham (a)	
2023	6–7 Oct	Hong Kong	(Czech Republic) Kristýna Napoleaová (c) (Germany) Laura Fünfstück (Argentina) Magdalena Simmermacher (South Korea) John Hyun (a)	261	–31	1 stroke	(Thailand) Trichat Cheenglab (c) (Austria) Christine Wolf (Czech Republic) Jana Melichová (Hong Kong) Arianna Lau (a)	
2023	3–4 Nov	Riyadh, Saudi Arabia	(Spain) Carlota Ciganda (c) (Czech Republic) Sára Kousková (Italy) Alessandra Fanali (Saudi Arabia) Lujain Khalil (a)	245	–43	3 strokes	(United States) Alison Lee (c) (Switzerland) Kim Métraux (India) Gaurika Bishnoi (United States) Chris Thomas (a)	
2024	8–9 Mar	Tampa, Florida, U.S.	(France) Pauline Roussin (c) (France) Céline Herbin (England) Meghan MacLaren (Saudi Arabia) Lujain Khalil (a)	260	–28	1 stroke	(England) Charley Hull (c) (Scotland) Kelsey Macdonald (Slovenia) Pia Babnik (United States) Alexandra O'Laughlin (a)	
2024	8–9 Mar	Tampa, Florida, U.S.	(France) Pauline Roussin (c) (France) Céline Herbin (England) Meghan MacLaren (Saudi Arabia) Lujain Khalil (a)	260	–28	1 stroke	(England) Alice Hewson (c) (Austria) Emma Spitz (England) Hayley Davis (United States) Barry Hyde (a)	
2024	10–11 May	Seoul, South Korea	(United States) Danielle Kang (c) (England) Lily May Humphreys (China) Tian Xiaolin (South Korea) Lee Kyu-ho (a)	265	–23	2 strokes	(Sweden) Johanna Gustavsson (c) (Scotland) Laura Beveridge (England) Gemma Clews (South Korea) Shin Jae-ho (a)	
2024	3–4 Jul	London, England	(France) Nastasia Nadaud (c) (Czech Republic) Kristýna Napoleaová (Spain) Mireia Prat (England) George Brooksbank (a)	268	–24	Playoff (Note: Team Nadaud won with a birdie on the third playoff hole.)	(England) Georgia Hall (c) (England) Hannah Burke (Morocco) Lina Belmati (England) Shane Hart-Jones (a)	
2024	4–5 Oct	Shenzhen, China	(Switzerland) Chiara Tamburlini (c) (South Africa) Lee-Anne Pace (China) Lin Qianhui (China) Peng Yanxuan (a)	255	–37	1 stroke	(France) Céline Boutier (c) (Thailand) Kusuma Meechai (Thailand) Pakin Kawinpakorn (China) Wu Xiao-Guang (a)	
2024	1–2 Nov	Riyadh, Saudi Arabia	(Switzerland) Chiara Tamburlini (c) (England) Mimi Rhodes (France) Anne-Charlotte Mora (China) Tenniel Chu (a)	245	–43	10 strokes	(Germany) Helen Briem (c) (Germany) Patricia Isabel Schmidt (Germany) Sophie Witt (Saudi Arabia) Mohammed Almushabi (a)	
PIF Global Series
2025	13–14 Feb	Riyadh, Saudi Arabia (Note: Played as the PIF Saudi Ladies International team event)	(South Korea) Lee So-mi (c) (France) Nastasia Nadaud (England) Amy Taylor (South Korea) Kim Min-sun	254	–34	2 strokes	(Australia) Stephanie Kyriacou (c) (England) Liz Young (Germany) Olivia Cowan (Czech Republic) Sára Kousková	
2025	9–10 May	Seoul, South Korea	(Czech Republic) Sára Kousková (c) (United States) Brianna Navarrosa (Germany) Patricia Isabel Schmidt (South Africa) Lee-Anne Pace	267	–21	1 stroke	(France) Perrine Delacour (c) (Morocco) Maha Haddioui (Germany) Polly Mack (England) Eleanor Givens	
2025	8–9 Aug	London, England	(South Africa) Danielle du Toit (c) (Australia) Sarah Kemp (Spain) Marta Sanz Barrio (England) Megan Dennis	263	–29	1 stroke	(England) Georgia Hall (c) (Slovenia) Pia Babnik (Spain) Teresa Toscano (Hong Kong) Ginnie Ding	
2025	8–9 Aug	London, England	(South Africa) Danielle du Toit (c) (Australia) Sarah Kemp (Spain) Marta Sanz Barrio (England) Megan Dennis	263	–29	1 stroke	(Switzerland) Chiara Tamburlini (c) (Republic of Ireland) Sara Byrne (Ecuador) Daniela Darquea (England) Rosie Davies	
2025	8–9 Aug	London, England	(South Africa) Danielle du Toit (c) (Australia) Sarah Kemp (Spain) Marta Sanz Barrio (England) Megan Dennis	263	–29	1 stroke	(France) Nastasia Nadaud (c) (Sweden) Sofie Bringner (Germany) Laura Fünfstück (Sweden) Johanna Wrigley	
2025	5–6 Sep	Houston, Texas, U.S.	(Czech Republic) Sára Kousková (c) (Thailand) April Angurasaranee (Slovenia) Ana Belac (Denmark) Sofie Kibsgaard Nielsen	256	–32	1 stroke	(France) Céline Herbin (c) (Republic of Ireland) Sara Byrne (Czech Republic) Kristýna Napoleaová (England) Mimi Rhodes	
2025	5–6 Sep	Houston, Texas, U.S.	(Czech Republic) Sára Kousková (c) (Thailand) April Angurasaranee (Slovenia) Ana Belac (Denmark) Sofie Kibsgaard Nielsen	256	–32	1 stroke	(France) Céline Boutier (c) (Spain) Luna Sobron Galmes (Australia) Maddison Hinson-Tolchard (Argentina) Magdalena Simmermacher	
2025	6–7 Nov	Shenzhen, China	(England) Mimi Rhodes (c) (Thailand) Trichat Cheenglab (Czech Republic) Kristýna Napoleaová (Thailand) Kultida Pramphun	253	–39	4 strokes	(South Africa) Casandra Alexander (c) (England) Charlotte Laffar (China) Runzhi Pang (China) Qianhui Lin	

(c) – Captain, (a) – Amateur

== See also ==
- Aramco Saudi Ladies International
