= Magdalena Simmermacher =

Argentine professional golfer (born 1996)

Personal information
- Nickname: Maggie
- Nationality: Argentina
- Born: 23 March 1996 (age 30) Buenos Aires, Argentina
- Height: 5 ft 8 in (1.73 m)

Career
- Sport: Golf
- College: Old Dominion University
- Turned professional: 2019
- Current tours: Ladies European Tour (joined 2020); LPGA Tour
- Former tour: LET Access Series (joined 2019)

Best results in LPGA major championships
- Chevron Championship: DNP
- Women's PGA C'ship: DNP
- U.S. Women's Open: DNP
- Women's British Open: CUT: 2021, 2022, 2023
- Evian Championship: CUT: 2022, 2023

Achievements and awards
- Argentine National Ranking Winner: 2013–14
- Conference USA Player of the Year: 2017–18

Magdalena Simmermacher (born 23 March 1996) is an Argentine professional golfer who plays on the Ladies European Tour. She was runner-up at the 2020 Ladies Open de France, 2021 Skaftö Open and 2022 South African Women's Open. She represented Argentina at the 2020 Summer Olympics in Tokyo.

== Amateur career ==
Simmermacher was born in Buenos Aires, Argentina, the third of four siblings, and played golf from age four. She played field hockey for a well-known club in Buenos Aires and represented Argentina at the ADE in South Africa in 2011 until she decided to focus on golf at the age of 13. She won several National Championships between 2012 and 2017, including the Argentine National Ranking in 2013–14. She represented Argentina at three World Amateur Team Championships, four South American Individual Championships, and five 'Copa los Andes', being champions in 2017.

Simmermacher played college golf in the United States at Old Dominion University in Norfolk, Virginia and graduated in 2018 with a degree in international business and a minor in economics. She played on the Old Dominion Lady Monarchs team all four years, earning Freshman of the Year 2014–15 and Conference USA Player of the Year 2017–18. Her team claimed the Conference USA Championships in 2017.

== Professional career ==
In March 2019, Simmermacher turned professional and joined the LET Access Series. She played in both of the season's dual LET/LETAS events and received an invitation for the LET event Estrella Damm Mediterranean Ladies Open, where she finished tied 17th. The week after, she came close to securing her first professional victory at the LETAS season finale, the Road To La Largue Final, where she lost a playoff to Niina Liias of Finland. She ended 2019 ranked 585 on the Women's World Golf Rankings as the best Argentine professional golfer and ninth in Latin America.

Simmermacher finished second at Q-School to earn full status for the 2020 Ladies European Tour. At the Lacoste Ladies Open de France, she recorded a bogey-free and career-low round of 66 to finish a career-high of T2, one stroke behind Julia Engström. She finished 2020 ranked 30th on the Costa del Sol Order of Merit and third in the LET Rookie of the Year ranking, behind Stephanie Kyriacou and Alice Hewson.

Simmermacher qualified for the 2020 Summer Olympics in Tokyo where she finished 58th.

In 2021, she recorded a season-best of runner-up at the Skaftö Open in Sweden and tied for third at the Lacoste Ladies Open de France. She formed the runner-up team at the Aramco Team Series – New York with Sophia Popov and Hayley Davis. She finished 12th on the Costa del Sol Order of Merit and rose to 258th in the world ranking.

In 2022, Simmermacher led after the first round of the Investec South African Women's Open in Cape Town but eventually lost a six-hole playoff battle to defending champion Lee-Anne Pace. In May she finished third at the Australian Ladies Classic and Women's NSW Open, before captaining a team with Charlotte Liautier and Isabella Deilert to a runner-up finish at the Aramco Team Series – Bangkok.

Simmermacher earned her LPGA Tour card for 2023 via Q-School.

== Amateur wins (3) ==
- 2012 Campeonato Argentino Damas de Menores y Menores 15
- 2014 Campeonato Nacional por Golpes
- 2017 Campeonato Argentino de Aficionadas - Copa FiberCorp

== Playoff record ==
Ladies European Tour playoff record (0–1)

| No. | Year | Tournament | Opponent | Result |
|---|---|---|---|---|
| 1 | 2022 | Investec South African Women's Open | (South Africa) Lee-Anne Pace | Lost to birdie on sixth extra hole |

LET Access Series playoff record (0–1)

| No. | Year | Tournament | Opponent | Result |
|---|---|---|---|---|
| 1 | 2019 | Road To La Largue Final | (Finland) Niina Liias | Lost to birdie on first extra hole |

== Team appearances ==
Amateur

- Espirito Santo Trophy (representing Argentina): 2014, 2016, 2018
