= Charlotte Liautier =

French professional golfer (born 1999)

Personal information
- Nationality: France
- Born: 26 May 1999 (age 27) Saint-Clotilde, Réunion
- Height: 5 ft 10 in (178 cm)

Career
- Sport: Golf
- Turned professional: 2021
- Current tour: Ladies European Tour (joined 2022)
- Former tour: LET Access Series (joined 2021)
- Professional wins: 1

Charlotte Liautier (born 26 May 1999) is a French professional golfer who plays on the Ladies European Tour. In 2022, she was runner-up at the Aramco Team Series – Bangkok team event.

== Early life and amateur career ==
Liautier was born in Saint-Clotilde, Réunion and grew up in Paris. She began playing golf at the age of 12 and plays at Saint-Nom-la-Bretèche.

Liautier enjoyed a prolific amateur career and competed in the European Girls' Team Championship and European Ladies' Team Championship for France. She recorded three international titles in the 2016 Swiss International, 2020 French International and 2021 Italian International.

Liautier played on the LET Access Series in 2021 as an amateur. She won the season finale in Spain, the Santander Golf Tour Barcelona, and finished 7th in the Order of Merit, missing out on automatic qualification to the LET by one place.

== Professional career ==
Liautier turned professional in late 2021 after she finished in the top-20 at LET Q-School to secure a card for the 2022 Ladies European Tour.

In her rookie season, she made the cut in her first five starts and was runner-up at the Aramco Team Series – Bangkok team event, teamed with Magdalena Simmermacher of Argentina and Isabella Deilert of Sweden.

== Amateur wins ==
- 2016 Swiss International Ladies Amateur Championship
- 2019 Grand Prix de Saint Nom la Breteche, Grand Prix De Joyenval
- 2020 French International Ladies Amateur Championship
- 2021 Italian International Ladies Amateur Championship

== Professional wins (1) ==
=== LET Access Series wins (1) ===
No.	Date	Tournament	Winning score	To par	Margin of victory	Runners-up
1	20 Oct 2021	Santander Golf Tour Barcelona (as an amateur)	71-71-74=216	E	1 stroke	(Germany) Helen Briem (a) (England) Rachael Goodall

== Team appearances ==
Amateur

- European Girls' Team Championship (representing France): 2016, 2017
- European Ladies' Team Championship (representing France): 2021
