= Dutch Ladies Open =

Coordinates: 52°19′N 5°33′E

Tournament information
- Location: Utrecht, Netherlands
- Established: 1986
- Courses: Goyer Golf & Country Club
- Par: 72
- Tour: Ladies European Tour
- Format: 54-hole Stroke play
- Prize fund: €350,000
- Month played: May

Tournament record score
- Aggregate: 270 Stephanie Kyriacou
- To par: –18 Stephanie Kyriacou

Current champion
- (England) Mimi Rhodes

Final champion
- Location in Europe Location in The Netherlands

The Dutch Ladies Open is a women's professional golf tournament on the Ladies European Tour that is played in the Netherlands. It was first played in 1986, and annually from 2004 to 2015. It resumed play in 2021.

== History ==
Home player Liz Weima won the 1994 event, held at Rijk van Nijmegen in hail, rain and cold winds, to become the first Dutch golfer, male or female, to win at the European level.

In 2025, for its 26th installment, the tournament was moved from Hilversumsche to Goyer Golf & Country Club in the province of Utrecht. The 54-hole stroke play competition featured a 132-player field, representing 33 different nationalities.

== Winners ==
Year	Venue	Winner	Score	Margin of victory	Runner(s)-up	Winner's share (€)
Dutch Ladies Open
2026	Goyer	(Thailand) Aunchisa Utama	207 (–9)	Playoff	(Norway) Dorthea Forbrigd	52,500
2025	Goyer	(England) Mimi Rhodes	207 (–9)	2 strokes	(United States) Brianna Navarrosa (Netherlands) Anne van Dam	49,500
2024	Hilversumsche	(Czech Republic) Jana Melichová	205 (–11)	1 stroke	(Switzerland) Kim Métraux	45,000
Big Green Egg Open
2023	Hilversumsche	(Thailand) Trichat Cheenglab	204 (–12)	1 stroke	(Denmark) Nicole Broch Estrup (Wales) Lydia Hall	45,000
2022	Rosendaelsche	(Sweden) Anna Nordqvist	281 (–7)	1 stroke	(Austria) Sarah Schober	37,500
2021	Rosendaelsche	(Australia) Stephanie Kyriacou	270 (–18)	2 strokes	(Finland) Sanna Nuutinen	30,000
2020	Rosendaelsche	Tournament cancelled due to the COVID-19 pandemic in the Netherlands.				30,000
2016–2019: No tournament
Deloitte Ladies Open
2015	The International	(Netherlands) Christel Boeljon	209 (–10)	4 strokes	(Denmark) Emily Kristine Pedersen (Finland) Ursula Wikström	37,500
2014	The International	(Scotland) Kylie Walker	213 (–6)	Playoff (Note: Walker won at the second playoff hole.)	(Australia) Nikki Campbell (Denmark) Malene Jørgensen	37,500
2013	The International	(England) Holly Clyburn	211 (–8)	3 strokes	(England) Charley Hull	37,500
2012	Broekpolder	(Spain) Carlota Ciganda	207 (–9)	2 strokes	(Finland) Ursula Wikstrom	37,500
2011	Broekpolder	(Scotland) Dale Reid	213 (–3)	1 stroke	(England) Holly Aitchison (France) Caroline Alfonso (Sweden) Caroline Hedwall	37,500
ABN AMRO Ladies Open
2010	Broekpolder	(England) Florentyna Parker	207 (–9)	2 strokes	(Scotland) Krystle Caithness	37,500
2009	Eindhovensche	(Spain) Tania Elosegui	207 (–9)	1 stroke	(Italy) Diana Luna	37,500
2008	Eindhovensche	(France) Gwladys Nocera	203 (–13)	1 stroke	(England) Melissa Reid	37,500
KLM Ladies Open
2007	Eindhovensche	(France) Gwladys Nocera	201 (–15)	7 strokes	(France) Virginie Lagoutte-Clement	27,000
2006	Eindhovensche	(France) Stephanie Arricau	204 (–12)	1 stroke	(Germany) Anja Monke	24,750
2005	Kennemer	(France) Virginie Lagoutte	215 (–1)	Playoff (Note: Lagoutte won at the second playoff hole.)	(Wales) Eleanor Pilgrim	24,750
2004	Kennemer	(Germany) Elisabeth Esterl	214 (–2)	2 strokes	(Spain) Marta Prieto	24,750
2002–2003: No tournament
Mexx Sport Open
2001	Kennemer	(France) Karine Icher	212 (–4)	Playoff (Note: Icher won with a birdie at the third playoff hole.)	(Norway) Suzann Pettersen	£15,000
2000	Kennemer	(Germany) Tina Fischer	211 (–5)	3 strokes	(Spain) Raquel Carriedo (England) Kirsty Taylor	£15,000
1996–1999: No tournament
Staatsloterij Ladies Open
1995	Rijk van Nijmegen	(France) Marie-Laure de Lorenzi	201 (–15)	9 strokes	(England) Lora Fairclough	£10,500
Sens Ladies Dutch Open
1994	Rijk van Nijmegen	(Netherlands) Liz Weima	214 (–2)	2 strokes	(Sweden) Sofia Grönberg-Whitmore	£8,250
Holiday Inn Leiden Ladies Open
1993	Rijswijk	(Australia) Corinne Dibnah	214 (–2)	1 stroke	(Sweden) Annika Sörenstam	£8,250
1992	Rijswijk	(France) Valerie Michaud	204 (–12)	1 stroke	(England) Laura Davies	£8,250
1989–1991: No tournament
Volmac Dutch Ladies Open
1988	Rosendaelsche	(France) Marie-Laure de Lorenzi	295 (+7)	1 stroke	(England) Kitrina Douglas	£9,000
1987	Royal Haagsche	(Scotland) Dale Reid	283 (–5)	3 strokes	(Northern Ireland) Maureen Garner	£7,500
1986	Hilversumsche	(England) Jane Forrest	282 (–6)	5 strokes	(Sweden) Liselotte Neumann	£6,750
