= Saudi Ladies International =

PIF Saudi Ladies International
Tournament information
- Location: Riyadh, Saudi Arabia
- Established: 2020
- Course: Riyadh Golf Club
- Par: 72
- Organised by: Golf Saudi
- Tour: Ladies European Tour
- Format: Stroke play
- Prize fund: US$5,000,000
- Month played: February

Current champion
- (England) Charley Hull

Final champion
- Location in Middle East Location in Saudi Arabia

The PIF Saudi Ladies International is a professional golf tournament on the Ladies European Tour (LET), played since 2020.

== History ==
The inaugural tournament was first played in Saudi Arabia at Royal Greens Golf & Country Club in King Abdullah Economic City by the Red Sea. It was the penultimate regular LET event of the 2020 season and marked the first time professional lady golfers played competitively in the country. It was followed the week after by the Saudi Ladies Team International, a team event that would later evolve into the Aramco Team Series.

For the 2023 tournament, the prize money increased from $1 million to $5 million, giving parity with the men's Saudi International for the first time.

In 2024, for its fifth installment, the tournament moved to the Riyadh Golf Club in Riyadh.

Before reverting in 2026, for 2025, the format was changed to that of the Aramco Team Series. The tournament was reduced to 54 holes and $0.5 million of the purse was allocated to a team event over the first two days. The 112-player field was made up of 62 LET players, 42 players from the top-300 in the Women's World Golf Rankings, and eight tournament invitations.

== Winners ==
| Year | Winner | Score | To par | Margin of victory | Runner(s)-up | Winner's share ($) | Venue |
PIF Saudi Ladies International
| 2026 | (England) Charley Hull | 70-67-67-65=269 | −19 | 1 stroke | (South Africa) Casandra Alexander (Japan) Akie Iwai | 750,000 | Riyadh GC |
| 2025 | (Thailand) Jeeno Thitikul | 67-64-69=200 | −16 | 4 strokes | (South Korea) Lee So-mi | 675,000 | Riyadh GC |
Aramco Saudi Ladies International
| 2024 | (Thailand) Patty Tavatanakit | 66-70-69-65=270 | −18 | 7 strokes | (Germany) Esther Henseleit | 750,000 | Riyadh GC |
| 2023 | (New Zealand) Lydia Ko (2) | 64-69-66-68=267 | −21 | 1 stroke | (India) Aditi Ashok | 750,000 | Royal Greens |
| 2022 | (England) Georgia Hall | 69-69-68-71=277 | −11 | 5 strokes | (Sweden) Johanna Gustavsson (Czech Republic) Kristýna Napoleaová | 150,000 | Royal Greens |
| 2021 | (New Zealand) Lydia Ko | 67-70-63-65=265 | −23 | 5 strokes | (Thailand) Atthaya Thitikul | 150,000 | Royal Greens |
| 2020 | (Denmark) Emily Kristine Pedersen | 67-68-71-72=278 | −10 | Playoff | (England) Georgia Hall | 150,000 | Royal Greens |

== See also ==
- Saudi Ladies Team International
