= Pauline Roussin =

French professional golfer (born 2000)

Personal information
- Full name: Pauline Roussin-Bouchard
- Nationality: France
- Born: 5 July 2000 (age 26) Montelimar, France
- Height: 165 cm (5 ft 5 in)

Career
- Sport: Golf
- College: University of South Carolina
- Turned professional: 2021
- Current tours: Ladies European Tour (joined 2021); LPGA Tour (joined 2022)
- Professional wins: 2

Number of wins by tour
- Ladies European Tour: 2

Best results in LPGA major championships
- Chevron Championship: T27: 2026
- Women's PGA C'ship: T10: 2025
- U.S. Women's Open: T28: 2025
- Women's British Open: T58: 2026
- Evian Championship: T38: 2021

Pauline Roussin-Bouchard (born 5 July 2000) is a French professional golfer who plays on the LPGA Tour and Ladies European Tour. She was number one in the World Amateur Golf Ranking for 34 weeks in 2020.

== Amateur career ==
Roussin represented the French National Team from age 14 and won the 2015 European Young Masters both individually and with her team. She played in two Espirito Santo Trophies (2016 and 2018) and six European Girls' Team Championship and European Ladies' Team Championships, winning silver in 2018.

She representied Europe at the 2016 Junior Ryder Cup and was on the winning Vagliano Trophy team in 2019. She won the 2020 Arnold Palmer Cup with the international team.

Roussin enrolled at the University of South Carolina in 2019 to play golf with the South Carolina Gamecocks. She had the best season for a freshman in program history and won five times in her first two years.

Roussin won the Spanish International Stroke Play and St Rule Trophy in 2016, and the Grand Prix de Valcros in 2017. In 2018 she was runner-up at the Swiss International Ladies Championship and Grand Prix de ligue PACA Dames, and won the Grand Prix de Valgarde.

In 2019, she won The Spirit International Amateur Golf Championship with France. She played in the Ladies European Tour event Jabra Ladies Open and was one stroke clear of the field heading into the final round, finishing runner-up as England's Annabel Dimmock won by one shot. The top two finish qualified her for the 2019 Evian Championship.

Roussin reached number one in the World Amateur Golf Ranking in January 2020. She made her U.S. Open debut at the 2020 U.S. Women's Open by virtue of her WAGR rank. She made the cut and finished T46.

== Professional career ==
Roussin turned professional in August 2021 and claimed a victory in just her second event as a professional, the Skaftö Open on the Ladies European Tour, two weeks after she ended life as an amateur, where she shot a second round of 60 (−9). She was runner-up at the 2022 Aramco Team Series – Sotogrande before capturing a second title at the Aramco Team Series – Singapore. In 2024, she was runner-up at the Lalla Meryem Cup, Women's Irish Open and La Sella Open in Spain, and finished 4th in the LET Order of Merit.

Roussin earned her card for the 2022 LPGA Tour through qualifying school. She tied for 10th at the 2025 Women's PGA Championship, and for 3rd at the 2026 HSBC Women's World Championship in Singapore.

== Amateur wins ==
- 2015 Grand Prix de Valcros, European Young Masters (individual)
- 2016 Spanish International Stroke Play, St Rule Trophy
- 2017 Grand Prix de Valcros
- 2018 Grand Prix de Valgarde
- 2019 Windy City Collegiate Championship, Portuguese International Ladies Amateur Championship, Grand Prix de ligue PACA Dames, Italian International Ladies Amateur Championship
- 2020 The Ally
- 2021 Moon Golf Invitational, Valspar Augusta Invitational, SEC Women's Golf Championship

== Professional wins (2) ==
=== Ladies European Tour wins (2) ===
No.	Date	Tournament	Winning score	Margin of victory	Runner(s)-up
1	29 Aug 2021	Didriksons Skaftö Open	−11 (68-60-68=196)	1 stroke	(Sweden) Linn Grant (Argentina) Magdalena Simmermacher
1	18 Mar 2023	Aramco Team Series – Singapore	−15 (68-69-64=191)	4 strokes	(United States) Danielle Kang

== Results in LPGA majors ==
Results not in chronological order.

Tournament	2019	2020	2021	2022	2023	2024	2025	2026
Chevron Championship				T35	CUT		T62	T27
U.S. Women's Open		T46		CUT		CUT	T28	
Women's PGA Championship				CUT			T10	T59
The Evian Championship	CUT	NT	T38	72	T54	CUT	CUT	T50
Women's British Open					CUT		T69	T58

Top 10
Did not play

CUT = missed the half-way cut
NT = no tournament
T = tied

=== Summary ===
Tournament	Wins	2nd	3rd	Top-5	Top-10	Top-25	Events	Cuts made
Chevron Championship	0	0	0	0	0	0	4	3
U.S. Women's Open	0	0	0	0	0	0	4	2
Women's PGA Championship	0	0	0	0	1	1	3	2
The Evian Championship	0	0	0	0	0	0	7	4
Women's British Open	0	0	0	0	0	0	3	2
Totals	0	0	0	0	1	1	21	13

- Most consecutive cuts made – 5 (2025 Women's British Open – 2026 Women's British Open, current)
- Longest streak of top-10s – 1 (once)

== Team appearances ==
Amateur

- European Young Masters (representing France): 2015 (winners)
- Junior Ryder Cup (representing Europe): 2016
- Espirito Santo Trophy (representing France): 2016, 2018
- European Girls' Team Championship (representing France): 2016, 2017
- European Ladies' Team Championship (representing France): 2018, 2019, 2020, 2021
- The Spirit International Amateur Golf Championship (representing France): 2019 (winners)
- Vagliano Trophy (representing the Continent of Europe): 2019 (winners)
- Arnold Palmer Cup: 2020 (winners), 2021
