= Eleanor Givens =

English professional golfer (born 1989)

Personal information
- Nickname: Ellie
- Nationality: England
- Born: 9 March 1989 (age 37) Darlington, England
- Height: 158 cm (5 ft 2 in)

Career
- Sport: Golf
- College: University of Denver
- Turned professional: 2012
- Current tour: Ladies European Tour (joined 2012)
- Former tour: Symetra Tour (2017)
- Professional wins: 1

Number of wins by tour
- Ladies European Tour: 1

Best results in LPGA major championships
- Chevron Championship: DNP
- Women's PGA C'ship: DNP
- U.S. Women's Open: DNP
- Women's British Open: CUT: 2020
- Evian Championship: DNP

Eleanor Ruth Givens (born 9 March 1989) is an English professional golfer and Ladies European Tour player. She won the 2026 VP Bank Swiss Ladies Open.

== Early life and amateur career ==
Givens was born in Darlington and started to play golf aged six learning from her father Ralph, a golf professional at Blackwell Grange Golf Club.

Givens was educated at Polam Hall School. Between 2007 and 2011, she played college golf at the University of Denver, majoring in finance.

== Professional career ==
Givens turned professional in 2012 and joined the Ladies European Tour after earning her card at Q-School. She recorded her first top-10 at the 2013 Turkish Airlines Ladies Open, where she finished in a tie for 6th, 3 strokes behind winner Lee-Anne Pace.

Givens made intermittent starts on the LET Access Series, where she lost a playoff at the 2013 Kristianstad Åhus Ladies PGA Open, and was runner-up at the 2015 Open Generali de Strasbourg.

She enjoyed success at the PIF Global Series team events, where she finished runner-up at the 2020 Saudi Ladies Team International with captain Manon De Roey and at the 2025 Aramco Korea Championship with captain Perrine Delacour, and won the 2023 Aramco Team Series - Singapore at Laguna National with captain Christine Wolf.

Givens claimed her maiden LET title in her 210th start, at the 2026 VP Bank Swiss Ladies Open.

== Professional wins (1) ==
=== Ladies European Tour wins (1) ===
No.	Date	Tournament	Winning score	Margin of victory	Runner(s)-up
1	15 Aug 2026	VP Bank Swiss Ladies Open	−13 (68-66-66=200)	1 stroke	(Germany) Alexandra Försterling (Republic of Ireland) Anna Foster (Australia) Whitney Hillier

== Playoff record ==
LET Access Series playoff record (0–1)

No.	Year	Tournament	Opponents	Result
1	2013	Kristianstad Åhus Ladies PGA Open	(Sweden) Linn Andersson (a) (Norway) Caroline Martens	Andersson won with eagle on first extra hole
