= Pia Babnik =

Slovenian professional golfer

Personal information
- Nationality: Slovenia
- Born: 2 January 2004 (age 22) Ljubljana, Slovenia
- Height: 5 ft 11 in (180 cm)

Career
- Sport: Golf
- Turned professional: 2020
- Current tour: Ladies European Tour (joined 2020)
- Professional wins: 2

Number of wins by tour
- Ladies European Tour: 2

Best results in LPGA major championships
- Chevron Championship: 3rd: 2022
- Women's PGA C'ship: CUT: 2022
- U.S. Women's Open: T29: 2024
- Women's British Open: T23: 2026
- Evian Championship: T54: 2022
Medal record
Mediterranean Games
Bronze medal – third place	2018 Tarragona	Women's team

Pia Babnik (born 2 January 2004) is a Slovenian professional golfer. She won the 2019 R&A Girls Amateur Championship. In 2020, 16 years old, she joined the Ladies European Tour, where she won two tournaments the year after. 18 years old, she finished third at one of the professional major championships, the 2022 Chevron Championship.

== Early life and amateur career ==
Babnik started to play golf at the age of three and joined her first junior golf competition at the age of four, where she also made her first birdie.

She has two younger brothers, twins Jaka and Ziga, who both represented Slovenia at the 2022 European Boys' Team Championship.

She has won national titles in Slovenia all age groups, and has won many international junior competitions.

Babnik played her first professional tournament at age 12 on the 2016 LET Access Series, the CitizenGuard LETAS Trophy in Belgium, and made the cut. She represented Slovenia at the 2017 European Girls' Team Championship and would do so again at the 2018 and 2019 European Ladies' Team Championship. In 2019, at age 15, she won the individual title, ahead of last years winner and world amateur number one, Frida Kinhult.

Babnik set a record low score in the 2018 Trnovo Masters with 58 strokes (−10). At the 2018 Mediterranean Games, she won bronze medal with Vida Obersnel and Ana Belac in the women's team event.

At 15 years old, Babnik played her first LET tournament, the 2019 Czech Ladies Open, and again made the cut. The same year, she won the Helen Holm Scottish Women's Open Championship at Royal Troon ahead of runner-up Charlotte Bunel of France, with a seven-shot margin of victory and a record 15-under aggregate. Only Ireland's Leona Maguire at a mere 14 in 2009 had been a younger champion. Babnik returned to Scotland to take home the centenary Girls Amateur Championship at Panmure Golf Club, defeating Austria's Isabella Holpfer in the 18-hole final, 4 and 3. Through her victory, she earned exemptions into Final Qualifying for the 2020 Women's British Open, as well as the Women's Amateur Championship and the Augusta National Women's Amateur Championship.

Babnik qualified for the Junior Solheim Cup and represented Europe in the competition at Gleneagles, and also in the continent's Junior Vagliano Trophy team which triumphed at Royal St George's Golf Club. Babnik became World Amateur Golf Ranking ranked at the age of ten and finished 2019 in fifth place on the WAGR ranking and completed her amateur career with a +7.0 handicap.

== Professional career ==
Babnik illustrated her talent by securing a card at the final stage of LET Qualifying School at age 16, the youngest in the field at the La Manga Club in Spain. She finished well inside the top 20 at 11th place to earn her playing rights on the 2020 Ladies European Tour.

By October 2020, she had made the cut in all her LET starts and was 25th on the Order of Merit. She finished top-10 at the Women's NSW Open and the Czech Ladies Open and came close to winning the Lavaux Ladies Open, a LET Access Series event in Switzerland, but lost a playoff to Agathe Laisné.

In June 2021, she won the Jabra Ladies Open after a playoff with Annabel Dimmock. In November 2021, she secured her second Ladies European Tour title at the Aramco Team Series – Jeddah

Babnik reached her best finish so far at one of the major championships in women's golf, at the 2022 Chevron Championship at Mission Hills Country Club in Rancho Mirage, California. With a six-under-par score of 66 in the final round, Babnik advanced to third place, behind Jennifer Kupcho and Jessica Korda, and earned $334,972.

== Amateur wins ==
- 2016 Evolve Spanish Junior Championship
- 2017 Slovenian Junior Masters, The German Futures Girls Division, Slovenian Amateur Championship, Srixon Norwegian Winter Open (Mar Menor)
- 2018 Trnovo Masters, Winter Series El Valle
- 2019 Girls Amateur Championship, Helen Holm Scottish Women's Open Championship, Evolve Spanish Junior Championship, Slovenian National Match Play, US Kids - European Championship, Atlantic Youth Trophy, Portuguese Intercollegiate Open

== Professional wins (2) ==
=== Ladies European Tour wins (2) ===
No.	Date	Tournament	Winning score	To par	Margin of victory	Runner-up
1	6 Jun 2021	Jabra Ladies Open	69-70-70=209	−4	Playoff	(England) Annabel Dimmock
2	12 Nov 2021	Aramco Team Series – Jeddah (individual event)	70-65-65=200	−16	1 stroke	(Germany) Olivia Cowan

== Results in LPGA majors ==
Results not in chronological order before 2023.

Tournament	2021	2022	2023	2024	2025	2026
Chevron Championship		3	CUT			
U.S. Women's Open		T44		T29	CUT	
Women's PGA Championship		CUT				
The Evian Championship	CUT	T54				
Women's British Open	CUT	CUT				T23

Top 10
Did not play

CUT = missed the half-way cut
T = tied

=== Summary ===
Tournament	Wins	2nd	3rd	Top-5	Top-10	Top-25	Events	Cuts made
Chevron Championship	0	0	1	1	1	1	2	1
U.S. Women's Open	0	0	0	0	0	0	3	2
Women's PGA Championship	0	0	0	0	0	0	1	0
The Evian Championship	0	0	0	0	0	0	2	1
Women's British Open	0	0	0	0	0	1	3	1
Totals	0	0	1	1	1	2	11	5

== World ranking ==
Position in Women's World Golf Rankings at the end of each calendar year.

Year	Ranking	Source
2019	1,141	
2020	492	
2021	106	
2022	67	
2024	302	
2024	216	

== Team appearances ==
Amateur

- European Girls' Team Championship (representing Slovenia): 2017
- European Ladies' Team Championship (representing Slovenia): 2018, 2019
- Mediterranean Games (representing Slovenia): 2018
- Junior Solheim Cup (representing Europe): 2019
- Junior Vagliano Trophy (representing the Continent of Europe): 2019 (winners)
