= Caroline Martens =

Norwegian professional golfer (born 1986)

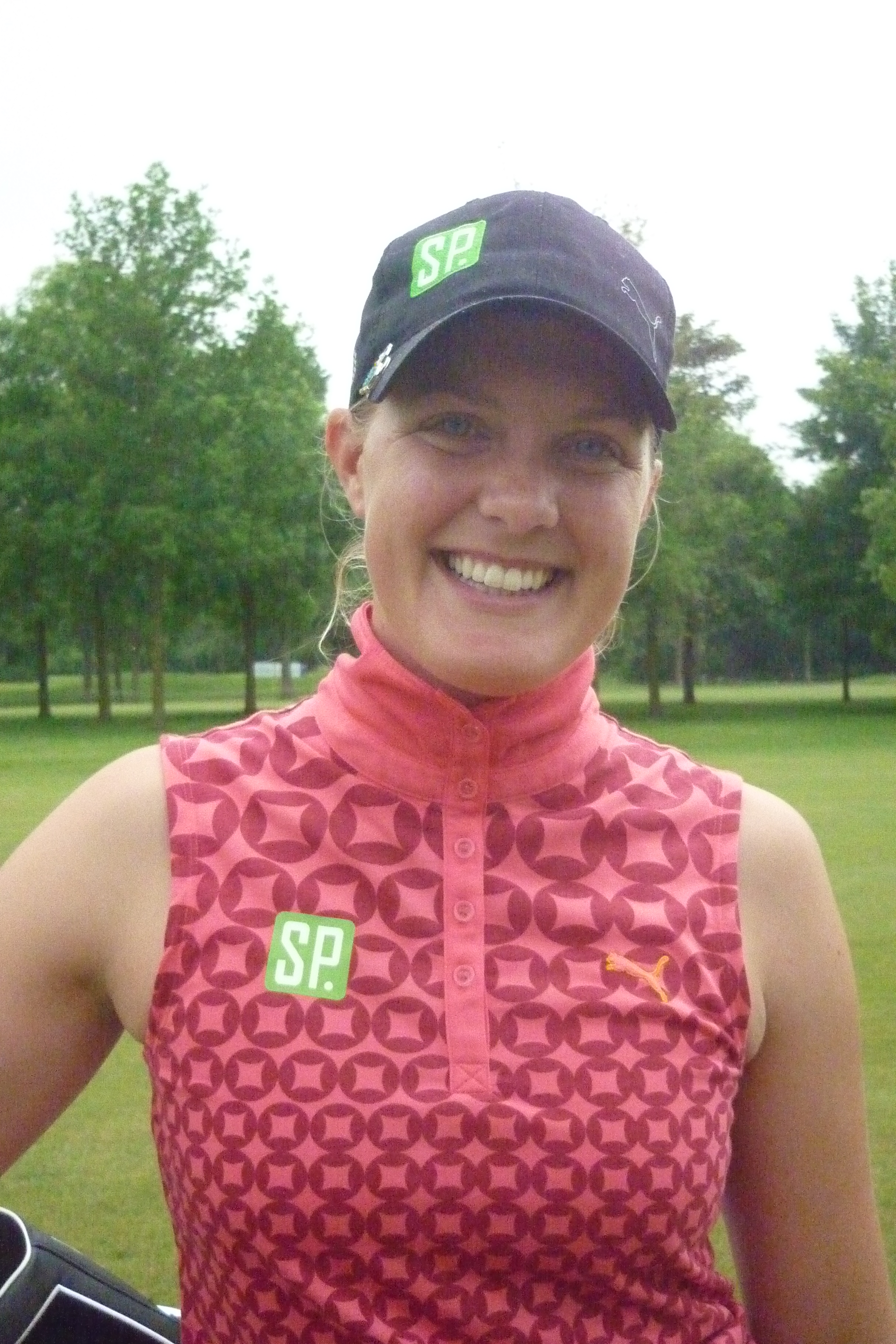

Personal information
- Nationality: Norway
- Born: 27 December 1986 (age 39) Oslo, Norway
- Height: 5 ft 10 in (178 cm)

Career
- Sport: Golf
- College: Louisiana State University
- Turned professional: 2010
- Former tours: Ladies European Tour (2011–2018); LET Access Series; Swedish Golf Tour

Achievements and awards
- Norwegian Golfer of the Year: 2003

Caroline Martens (born 27 December 1986) is a retired Norwegian professional golfer. She played on the Ladies European Tour 2011–2018, and served as a vice-captain at the Solheim Cup in 2023 and 2024.

== Amateur career ==
Martens won the Norwegian Junior Championship at the age of 12 and was named the 2003 Golfer of the Year in Norway.

Martens was a student at NTG Bærum between 2002 and 2005, and attended Louisiana State University between 2005 and 2009, where she obtained a bachelor's degree in psychology. Playing four years on the LSU Lady Tigers team she had a career average of 76.6 for 109 total rounds. She made two appearances in the NCAA Division I women's golf championship, in 2006 and 2008.

== Professional career ==
Martens turned professional in 2010 and joined the Swedish Golf Tour where she made all but one cut. In 2011, she played a limited Ladies European Tour schedule before joining the LET full time in 2012, where her best finish was a tie for 9th at the ISPS Handa Ladies British Masters at Buckinghamshire Golf Club, 3 strokes behind winner Lydia Hall.

In 2013, she suffered a shoulder injury and played mainly on the LET Access Series, where she tied for 3rd at the Mineks Ladies Classic in Turkey and lost a playoff at the Swedish PGA Championship held at Kristianstad Golf Club. At the end of the year, she won the LET Q-School by eight shots.

Martens also made six starts on the U.S.-based Symetra Tour in 2016 and 2017.

In August 2022, European Solheim Cup captain Suzann Pettersen appointed Martens as one of three vice-captains for the 2023 Solheim Cup, alongside Laura Davies and Anna Nordqvist.

== Amateur wins ==
- 2004 Norwegian Junior Championship

== Playoff record ==
LET Access Series playoff record (0–1)

No.	Year	Tournament	Opponents	Result
1	2013	Kristianstad Åhus Ladies PGA Open	(Sweden) Linn Andersson (England) Eleanor Givens	Andersson won with eagle on first extra hole

== Team appearances ==
Amateur

- European Ladies' Team Championship (representing Norway): 2007, 2009
