= Isabella Deilert =

Swedish professional golfer (born 1994)

Personal information
- Nationality: Sweden
- Born: 5 June 1994 (age 32) Stockholm, Sweden
- Height: 5 ft 6 in (1.68 m)

Career
- Sport: Golf
- College: Oklahoma State University
- Turned professional: 2018
- Current tour: Ladies European Tour (joined 2019)
- Former tours: LET Access Series (joined 2019); Swedish Golf Tour (joined 2018)

Isabella Deilert (born 5 June 1994) is a Swedish professional golfer playing on the Ladies European Tour. She won the 2010 European Young Masters. In 2022 and 2023, she was runner-up in team events of the Aramco Team Series.

== Family and early years ==
Deilert was born 1994 in Stockholm to Gladys Dias Repetto from Peru and Arne Deilert, a Swedish professional golfer. She competed in bandy, a form of hockey, and was a member of the Swedish National Team before focusing on golf. Her brother Alexander Deilert was an accomplished junior golfer and is a professional ice hockey player, drafted by the Calgary Flames in 2008.

== Career ==
Deilert was selected to play for the Swedish National team in 2010. In her first appearance for the team, she won the European Young Masters in Hungary individually, and won the silver with her team. She became the first player to win both the Swedish Junior Stroke Play and Swedish Junior Match Play championships in the same year, and was selected to represent Europe in the Junior Ryder Cup.

In 2012, she provided the deciding point in Sweden's victory over Spain at the European Girls' Team Championship, with Linnea Ström and Emma Nilsson on the team. She was runner-up at an LET Access Series event, the Ljungbyhed Park PGA Ladies Open, two strokes behind Pamela Pretswell of Scotland.

Deilert attended Oklahoma State University–Stillwater on a golf scholarship between 2013 and 2017, and turned professional in 2018.

She joined the Swedish Golf Tour, where she recorded 8 top-10 finishes in 2018. In 2019, she joined the Ladies European Tour. With limited status, she made six starts as a rookie, with a best finish of T16 at the Czech Ladies Open, and played in 16 LETAS events, with best finishes of T4 at the Rügenwalder Mühle Ladies Open and 3rd at the Terre Blanche Ladies Open, one stroke behind winner Sarah Schober of Austria.

In 2022, Deilert was runner-up in the team event of the Aramco Team Series – Bangkok, as part of a team captained by Magdalena Simmermacher of Argentina. In 2023, she was on the Charley Hull team finishing runner-up at Aramco Team Series – London.

== Amateur wins (10) ==
- 2006 (1) Skandia Tour Regional #4 - Stockholm Syd
- 2009 (2) Skandia Tour Riks #4 - Stockholm, Skandia Tour Regional #7 - Stockholm Syd
- 2010 (3) European Young Masters, Swedish Junior Strokeplay Championship, Swedish Junior Matchplay Championship
- 2011 (3) Skandia Junior Open, Stockholm GDF Championship, Skandia Tour Elit #5
- 2015 (1) Alex Norén Junior Open

== Team appearances ==
Amateur

- Junior Ryder Cup (representing Europe): 2010
- European Young Masters: (representing Sweden): 2010
- European Girls' Team Championship (representing Sweden): 2011, 2012 (winners)
