= European Young Masters =

The European Young Masters is a European amateur mixed team golf championship for boys and girls under 16 organised by the European Golf Association.

The inaugural event was held in 1995, and it has been played annually since, with the exception of 1996.

25 editions have been contested so far.

== Format ==
The championship is contested by under-16 teams of two girls and two boys per EGA member federation, except in 1997 when an under-18 competition also took place.

The championship was introduced in 1995, with a format consisting of three rounds of stroke play. Medals (gold, silver and bronze) are awarded to the three leading boys and girls, and a trophy is presented to each of the winners.

In conjunction, a subsidiary Nation's Cup is contested in a similar format, where the three best of the two girl's and the two boy's scores will count each day. The total addition of the nine scores at the end of the competition will constitute the team’s score and the nation with the lowest score is proclaimed winner and presented a Nations' Cup trophy.

== Results ==
Year	Location	Girls' champion	Boys' champion	Nation's Cup winner
1995	England	(Italy) Barbara Paruscio	(Spain) Sergio García	Spain
1997	Italy	(Italy) Giulia Sergas (U18)	(Iceland) Omar Halldórsson (U18)	Italy
1997	Italy	(Norway) Suzann Pettersen	(Italy) Roberto Paolillo	Italy
1998	Italy	(Italy) Diana Luna	(Scotland) Barry Hume	Italy
1999	Italy	(Spain) Lucia Mar	(Spain) Rafa Cabrera-Bello	Spain
2000	Italy	(Spain) Carmen Alonso	(Spain) Rafa Cabrera-Bello	Spain
2001	Germany	(Spain) Emma Cabrera-Bello	(France) Tony Raillard	France
2002	Germany	(Spain) María Hernández	(Spain) Pablo Martín	Spain
2003	Germany	(Spain) Azahara Muñoz	(England) Ben Parker	Spain
2004	Austria	(Spain) Carlota Ciganda	(Wales) Zac Gould	Spain
2005	Austria	(Spain) Carlota Ciganda	(Netherlands) Floris de Vries	Spain
2006	Austria	(Germany) Saskia Hausladen	(Germany) Maximilian Kieffer	Germany
2007	France	(Scotland) Carly Booth	(Italy) Matteo Manassero	Italy
2008	France	(Republic of Ireland) Lisa Maguire	(France) Stanislas Gautier	France
2009	France	(Czech Republic) Klára Spilková	(Netherlands) Jeroen Krietemeijer	Czech Republic
2010	Hungary	(Sweden) Isabella Deilert	(Finland) Albert Eckhardt	Finland
2011	Hungary	(Spain) Harang Lee	(France) Kenny Subregis	Spain
2012	Hungary	(Spain) Covadonga Sanjuan	(Italy) Renato Paratore	Italy
2013	Germany	(Spain) Covadonga Sanjuan	(England) Bradley Moore	Germany
2014	Germany	(Germany) Alexandra Försterling	(Germany) Max Schmitt	Germany
2015	Switzerland	(France) Pauline Roussin-Bouchard	(Norway) Markus Braadlie	France
2016	Switzerland	(Finland) Elina Saksa	(Belgium) Adrien Dumont de Chassart	Czech Republic
2017	Norway	(England) Lily May Humphreys	(Norway) Bård Bjørnevik Skogen	Germany
2018	Norway	(England) Caitlin Whitehead	(Denmark) Sebastian Friedrichsen	Sweden
2019	Czech Republic	(Germany) Paula Schulz-Hanssen	(Norway) Michael Alexander Mjaaseth	Germany
2020	Czech Republic	(Germany) Emilie von Finckenstein	(France) Maxence Giboudot	Germany
2021	Finland	(Germany) Helen Briem	(Spain) Jorge Siyuan Hao	Germany
2022	Finland	(Iceland) Perla Sól Sigurbrandsdóttir	(Netherlands) Denny Kloeth	Czech Republic
2023	Slovakia	(Italy) Natalia Aparicio	(England) Ben Bolton	France
2024	Slovakia	(England) Annabel Peaford	(Scotland) Aidan Lawson	France
2025	France	(England) Ellie Lichtenhein	(Czech Republic) Štěpán Plášek	Germany
2026	Spain	(Estonia) Kristella Sikk	(France) Tao Pemerika	France

== Nation's Cup results ==
Country	Winner
Spain	8
Germany	8
France	6
Italy	5
Czech Republic	3
Finland	1
Sweden	1
Total	32
