= Alexandra Försterling =

German professional golfer (born 1999)

Personal information
- Nickname: Lexi
- Nationality: Germany
- Born: 27 November 1999 (age 26) Berlin, Germany
- Height: 172 cm (5 ft 8 in)

Career
- Sport: Golf
- College: Arizona State University
- Turned professional: 2022
- Current tours: Ladies European Tour (joined 2023); LPGA Tour (joined 2024)
- Professional wins: 4

Number of wins by tour
- Ladies European Tour: 4

Best results in LPGA major championships
- Chevron Championship: DNP
- Women's PGA C'ship: CUT: 2024
- U.S. Women's Open: T51: 2024
- Women's British Open: T36: 2026
- Evian Championship: CUT: 2024, 2026

Alexandra Försterling (born 27 November 1999) is a German professional golfer who plays on the LPGA Tour and Ladies European Tour. She has won four LET titles including the 2023 VP Bank Swiss Ladies Open and 2024 Amundi German Masters. As an amateur, she won the 2014 European Young Masters and was runner-up at the 2020 European Ladies' Team Championship and the 2021 European Ladies Amateur.

== Amateur career ==
Försterling became a member of the German National Team in 2014, the year in which she won the European Young Masters both individually and with the team. Also in 2014, she was selected for the European team at the Junior Ryder Cup, held at Blairgowrie Golf Club in Scotland.

She appeared four times at the European Girls' Team Championship between 2014 and 2017. Along with Helen Tamy Kreuzer, Aline Krauter and Paula Schulz-Hanssen she was runner-up at the 2020 European Ladies' Team Championship, beaten 2–1 in the final by a Swedish team with Linn Grant, Ingrid Lindblad, Maja Stark and Beatrice Wallin.

Försterling won the Berlin Open in 2016, 2017 and 2019. In 2017, she finished third at the Helen Holm Scottish Women's Open Championship, 7 strokes behind Linn Grant.

Försterling enrolled at Arizona State University in 2018 and started playing with the Arizona State Sun Devils women's golf team. In 2021, she shared the Match in the Desert individual title with teammate Linn Grant, after firing a 68 in the opening round.

In 2021, she won the German International Amateur, carding rounds of 70, 68, 66 and 68 to finish at 272 and win by four. She was runner-up at the European Ladies Amateur in Italy, 3 strokes behind Ingrid Lindblad.

== Professional career ==
Försterling turned professional in December 2022 and joined the 2023 Ladies European Tour after shooting the lowest score at LET Q-School at La Manga in Spain, alongside compatriot Polly Mack.

In her rookie season, she won the VP Bank Swiss Ladies Open and Mallorca Ladies Open to finish 8th in the Order of Merit and runner-up in the LET Rookie of the Year standings, behind only Trichat Cheenglab. At the end of the year, she earned an LPGA Tour card at Q-school.

In 2024, Försterling won the Aramco Team Series event in Florida and became the first German to win an LET event on home soil when she won the Amundi German Masters in a playoff with Emma Spitz.

== Amateur wins ==
- 2014 European Young Masters
- 2016 Coca-Cola Berlin Open
- 2017 Berlin Open Championship
- 2019 Berlin Open Championship
- 2021 German International Amateur
- 2022 Ping/ASU Invitational

== Professional wins (4) ==
=== Ladies European Tour wins (4) ===
No.	Date	Tournament	Winning score	To par	Margin of victory	Runner-up
1	17 Sep 2023	VP Bank Swiss Ladies Open	66-66-66=198	−15	2 strokes	(Norway) Madelene Stavnar
2	18 Nov 2023	Mallorca Ladies Open	69-67-67=203	−13	5 strokes	(Thailand) Trichat Cheenglab
3	10 Mar 2024	Aramco Team Series – Tampa	67-70-67=204	−12	3 strokes	(England) Charley Hull
4	19 May 2024	Amundi German Masters	70-70-69-67=276	−12	Playoff	(Austria) Emma Spitz

LET playoff record (1–0)

No.	Year	Tournament	Opponent	Result
1	2024	Amundi German Masters	(Austria) Emma Spitz	Won with birdie on second extra hole

== Results in LPGA majors ==
Tournament	2024	2025	2026
ANA Inspiration			
U.S. Women's Open	T51		
Women's PGA Championship	CUT		
The Evian Championship	CUT		CUT
Women's British Open	T60	CUT	T36

Did not play

CUT = missed the half-way cut
T = tied

== Team appearances ==
Amateur

- Junior Ryder Cup (representing Europe): 2014
- European Young Masters (representing Germany): 2014 (winners)
- World Junior Girls Championship (representing Germany): 2017
- European Girls' Team Championship (representing Germany): 2014, 2015, 2016, 2017
- European Ladies' Team Championship (representing Germany): 2020, 2021, 2022
- Espirito Santo Trophy (representing Germany): 2022
- Arnold Palmer Cup (representing International team): 2022 (winners)
