= LETAS Grand Finale =

Tournament information
- Location: Paris, France
- Established: 2019
- Course(s): Golf de l'Isle Adam
- Par: 72
- Tour(s): LET Access Series
- Format: 54-hole Stroke play
- Prize fund: €80,000
- Month played: October

Current champion
- (Finland) Niina Liias

The LETAS Grand Finale was a women's professional golf tournament played as the season finale of the LET Access Series, held first in 2019 in France.

The inaugural tournament was held in 2019 at Golf Club de La Largue in Mooslargue, France as the Road To La Largue Final. With a purse of €80,000 it was the richest on LETAS to date (excluding dual-ranking events with the Ladies European Tour). Overnight leader Niina Liias clinched the title in a playoff against Magdalena Simmermacher. Liias secured her maiden professional victory with a birdie on the 365-yard par four 9th thanks to an eight iron approach that left her a short putt for the win.

2020 and 2021 saw pandemic schedule disruptions but the event was scheduled to return in 2022, now held at L'Isle Adam near Paris. The 2022 tournament was eventually removed from the schedule. The tournament was dropped from the 2023 schedule.

The 2022 tournament was to feature the top 50 players in the Order of Merit along with 10 invitees.

== Winners ==
Year	Winner	Country	Score	Margin of victory	Runner-up	Purse (€)	Venue	Ref
LETAS Grand Finale
2022	Tournament cancelled					80,000	L'Isle Adam	
2020–21: No tournament
Road To La Largue Final
2019	Niina Liias	Finland	−6 (71-68-71=210)	Playoff	(Argentina) Magdalena Simmermacher	80,000	La Largue	
