= Stephanie Kyriacou =

Australian professional golfer (born 2000)

Personal information
- Nationality: Australia
- Born: 22 November 2000 (age 25) Sydney, New South Wales, Australia
- Height: 5 ft 2 in (1.57 m)

Career
- Sport: Golf
- Turned professional: 2020
- Current tours: Ladies European Tour (joined 2020); WPGA Tour of Australasia; LPGA Tour (joined 2022)
- Professional wins: 2

Number of wins by tour
- Ladies European Tour: 2
- WPGA Tour of Australasia: 1

Best results in LPGA major championships
- Chevron Championship: T30: 2025
- Women's PGA C'ship: T10: 2022
- U.S. Women's Open: CUT: 2024, 2025, 2026
- Women's British Open: T7: 2022
- Evian Championship: 2nd: 2024

Achievements and awards
- LET Rookie of the Year: 2020

Stephanie Kyriacou (born 22 November 2000) is an Australian professional golfer and LPGA Tour player. She won the 2020 Australian Ladies Classic – Bonville by eight strokes as an amateur and joined the Ladies European Tour on a two-year winner's exemption. In 2024, she was runner-up at The Evian Championship.

== Career ==
Kyriacou started to play golf aged four and came through the Jack Newton Junior Golf Programme and played in her first Jack Newton golf tournament, the 2011 State Junior Medals, when she was 10.

In January 2020, Kyriacou won the first tournament of the 2020 Ladies European Tour season, the Australian Ladies Classic at Bonville Golf Resort in New South Wales. She won by eight strokes over the world number 35 Ayean Cho of Korea, with a total of 22-under-par. Her second round of 63 was the lowest score ever recorded at Bonville but not a course record as preferred lies were used. Her tournament victory was the 10th by an amateur in the 42-year history of the LET.

Kyriacou earned a two-year exemption on the Ladies European Tour but was unable to collect the €36,000 prize money on offer at Bonville due to her amateur status. She turned professional two days later, on 25 January, ahead of making her professional debut in the Women's NSW Open at Dubbo Golf Club, where she missed the cut.

When competitive play resumed again in the second half of 2020, Kyriacou made the cut at her first major, the 2020 Women's British Open. She was runner-up at the Ladies Swiss Open behind Amy Boulden and fifth at both the Czech Ladies Open and the Lacoste Ladies Open de France, to end of the season as LET Rookie of the Year.

In 2021, Kyriacou won her second LET title and her first as a professional after she shot a bogey-free final round of 67 to win the Big Green Egg Open by two strokes ahead of Finland's Sanna Nuutinen. She finished the season third in the LET Order of Merit after ten top-10 finishes.

=== LPGA Tour ===
Kyriacou joined the 2022 LPGA Tour after earning her card through qualifying school. Her best finish in her rookie season was a tied 7th place at the 2022 Women's British Open at Carnoustie Golf Links.

In 2023, she recorded top-5 finishes at the Dana Open and The Annika, as well as at the Aramco Team Series - Hong Kong on the LET. She held the lead going into the final round of the 2024 Evian Championship and ultimately finished runner-up behind Ayaka Furue, who overtook her with an eagle on the final hole.

== Endorsements ==
Titleist, Under Armour, Aphrodite Hills Resort - Cyprus, Lending Association, Rapsodo Golf and Golf Australia

== Amateur wins ==
- 2017 Port Phillip Open Amateur & Victorian Women's Amateur
- 2019 Australian Master of the Amateurs, Port Phillip Open Amateur, Queensland Amateur Championship

== Professional wins (2) ==
=== Ladies European Tour wins (2) ===
No.	Date	Tournament	Winning score	Margin of victory	Runner-up
1	23 Feb 2020	Australian Ladies Classic – Bonville^	−22 (69-63-69-65=266)	8 strokes	(South Korea) Ayeon Cho
2	3 Jul 2021	Big Green Egg Open	−18 (66-72-65-67=270)	2 strokes	(Finland) Sanna Nuutinen

^Co-sanctioned by the ALPG Tour

== Results in LPGA majors ==
Results not in chronological order.

Tournament	2020	2021	2022	2023	2024	2025	2026
Chevron Championship				T49	T40	T30	CUT
U.S. Women's Open					CUT	CUT	CUT
Women's PGA Championship			T10	T61	T52	T47	
The Evian Championship	NT	T65	T31	T16	2	T14	
Women's British Open	72	T13	T7	CUT	T60	T8	CUT

Top 10
Did not play

CUT = missed the half-way cut
NT = no tournament
T = tied

=== Summary ===
Tournament	Wins	2nd	3rd	Top-5	Top-10	Top-25	Events	Cuts made
Chevron Championship	0	0	0	0	0	0	4	3
U.S. Women's Open	0	0	0	0	0	0	3	0
Women's PGA Championship	0	0	0	0	1	1	4	4
The Evian Championship	0	1	0	1	1	3	5	5
Women's British Open	0	0	0	0	2	3	7	5
Totals	0	1	0	1	4	7	23	17

- Most consecutive cuts made – 9 (2020 Women's British Open – 2023 Evian)
- Longest streak of top-10s – 1 (four times)

== LPGA Tour career summary ==
Year	Tournaments played	Cuts made*	Wins	2nd	3rd	Top 10s	Best finish	Earnings ($)	Money list rank	Scoring average	Scoring rank
2020	3	2	0	0	0	0	38	n/a	n/a	75.00	n/a
2021	Did not play										
2022	21	13	0	0	0	2	T7	483,135	55	71.24	65
2023	21	17	0	0	0	3	T4	538,690	54	71.28	62
2024	23	14	0	1	0	1	2	983,109	36	72.06	104
2025	22	18	0	0	0	5	T5	984,243	44	70.71	35
Totals^	90	64	0	1	0	10	2	2,989,177	164		

^Official as of 2025 season
*Includes matchplay and other tournaments without a cut.

== Team appearances ==
Professional

- International Crown (representing Australia): 2023, 2025 (winners)
