= 2021 Ladies European Tour =

Professional women's golf tour

2021 Ladies European Tour season
- Duration: February 2021 – November 2021
- Number of official events: 29 (6 cancelled)
- Most wins: 2 (tie): (Slovenia) Pia Babnik (Sweden) Maja Stark (Thailand) Atthaya Thitikul
- Order of Merit: (Thailand) Atthaya Thitikul
- Player of the Year: (Thailand) Atthaya Thitikul
- Rookie of the Year: (Thailand) Atthaya Thitikul
- Lowest stroke average: (Republic of Ireland) Leona Maguire

The 2021 Ladies European Tour was a series of golf tournaments for elite female golfers from around the world. The tournaments were sanctioned by the Ladies European Tour (LET).

The season was affected by the COVID-19 pandemic with many tournaments either being postponed or cancelled. Among the cancellations was the Australian Swing, the tour's season opening.

== Schedule ==
The table below shows the 2021 schedule. The season featured a month-long European Swing of the LPGA Tour, starting with the Evian Championship in late July. It also saw the introduction of the Aramco Team Series, four tournaments carrying a $1 million total prize fund each held in London, Sotogrande and New York, concluding in Saudi Arabia in November.

The numbers in brackets after the winners' names indicate the career wins on the Ladies European Tour, including that event, and is only shown for members of the tour.

Key

Major championships
Regular events
Team championships

Date	Tournament	Location	Winner	WWGR points	Purse	Other tours (Note: ALPG − ALPG Tour, EUR − European Tour, LPGA − LPGA Tour, SLT − Sunshine Ladies Tour.)	Notes
~~21 Feb~~	Australian Ladies Classic	Australia	Tournament cancelled			ALPG	
~~28 Feb~~	New South Wales Women's Open	Australia	Tournament cancelled			ALPG	
~~20 Mar~~; 16 May (Note: Rescheduled due to the COVID-19 pandemic.)	Investec South African Women's Open	South Africa	(South Africa) Lee-Anne Pace (10)	6	€200,000	SLT	
30 May	Ladies Italian Open	Italy	(France) Lucie Malchirand (1, a)	6	€200,000		Last played in 2014
5 Jun	Jabra Ladies Open	France	(Slovenia) Pia Babnik (1)	6	€200,000		
13 Jun	Scandinavian Mixed	Sweden	(England) Alice Hewson (n/c) (Note: Finished tied for third overall; for Order of Merit and World Ranking, she is credited with first-place points as it is based among the women only.) low woman	6	€1,000,000	EUR	(Note: Field of 78 men and 78 women playing for joint purse from different tees.)
27 Jun	Tipsport Czech Ladies Open	Czech Republic	(Thailand) Atthaya Thitikul (3)	6	€200,000		
3 Jul	Big Green Egg Open	Netherlands	(Australia) Stephanie Kyriacou (2)	6	€200,000		Last played in 2015
10 Jul	Aramco Team Series – London	England	(Norway) Marianne Skarpnord (5)	16	$200,000		Aramco Team Series Individual event
~~20 Jun~~; 17 Jul	Gant Ladies Open	Finland	(Finland) Matilda Castren (1)	6	€200,000		New event
25 Jul	Amundi Evian Championship	France	(Australia) Minjee Lee (n/a)	100	$4,500,000	LPGA	
1 Aug	ISPS Handa World Invitational	Northern Ireland	(Thailand) Pajaree Anannarukarn (1)	18	$1,500,000	LPGA	
~~9 Oct~~; 7 Aug	Aramco Team Series – Sotogrande (Note: Moved from Singapore.)	Spain	(United States) Alison Lee (n/a)	14	$200,000		Aramco Team Series Individual event
15 Aug	Trust Golf Women's Scottish Open	Scotland	(United States) Ryann O'Toole (n/a)	37	$1,500,000	LPGA	
22 Aug	AIG Women's Open	Scotland	(Sweden) Anna Nordqvist (4)	100	$5,800,000	LPGA	
29 Aug	Didriksons Skaftö Open	Sweden	(France) Pauline Roussin-Bouchard (1)	6	€220,000		New event
5 Sep	Creekhouse Ladies Open	Sweden	(Sweden) Maja Stark (1)	8	€400,000		New event
11 Sep	VP Bank Swiss Ladies Open	Switzerland	(Thailand) Atthaya Thitikul (4)	6	€200,000		
18 Sep	Lacoste Ladies Open de France	France	(France) Céline Boutier (3)	6	€300,000		
~~3 Oct~~	Hero Women's Indian Open	India	Tournament cancelled		~~$500,000~~		
~~18 Jul~~; 3 Oct	Estrella Damm Ladies Open	Spain	(Sweden) Maja Stark (2)	6	€250,000		
~~17 Oct~~	Magical Kenya Ladies Open	Kenya	Tournament cancelled		~~€300,000~~		
~~29 May~~; 16 Oct	Aramco Team Series – New York	United States	(England) Charley Hull (3)	19.5	$200,000		Aramco Team Series Individual event
~~24 Oct~~	Lalla Meryem Cup	Morocco	Tournament cancelled				
29 Oct	Dubai Moonlight Classic	United Arab Emirates	(England) Bronte Law (1)	15	€260,000		
7 Nov	Aramco Saudi Ladies International	Saudi Arabia	(New Zealand) Lydia Ko (6)	18.5	$1,000,000		
12 Nov	Aramco Team Series – Jeddah	Saudi Arabia	(Slovenia) Pia Babnik (2)	16.5	$200,000		Aramco Team Series Individual event
~~TBA~~	Ladies European Thailand Championship	Thailand	Tournament cancelled		~~€300,000~~		
28 Nov	Andalucia Costa Del Sol Open De España	Spain	(Spain) Carlota Ciganda (5)	12	€600,000		

=== Unofficial events ===
The following event appears on the schedule, but does not carry ranking points.

Date	Tournament	Host country	Winner(s)	WWGR points	Purse ($)	Notes
10 Jul	Aramco Team Series – London	England	(Germany) Olivia Cowan (Germany) Sarina Schmidt (India) Diksha Dagar (England) Andrew Kelsey (a)	–	800,000	Aramco Team Series Team event
~~9 Oct~~; 7 Aug	Aramco Team Series – Sotogrande (Note: Moved from Singapore.)	Spain	(South Africa) Ashleigh Buhai (South Africa) Stacy Bregman (England) Hayley Davis (Spain) Ignacio Morillo (a)	–	800,000	Aramco Team Series Team event
8 Aug	Olympic women's golf competition	Japan	(United States) Nelly Korda	37		
6 Sep	Solheim Cup	United States	Europe	–	–	
~~29 May~~; 16 Oct	Aramco Team Series – New York	United States	(United States) Jessica Korda (Germany) Karolin Lampert (Sweden) Lina Boqvist (United States) Alexandra O'Laughlin (a)	–	800,000	Aramco Team Series Team event
12 Nov	Aramco Team Series – Jeddah	Saudi Arabia	(Denmark) Emily Kristine Pedersen (England) Hannah Burke (Finland) Krista Bakker (Saudi Arabia) Ahmed Al Subaey (a)	–	800,000	Aramco Team Series Team event

== Order of Merit rankings ==
Rank	Player	Country	Points
1	Atthaya Thitikul	Thailand	3,592
2	Pia Babnik	Slovenia	1,954
3	Stephanie Kyriacou	Australia	1,765
4	Sanna Nuutinen	Finland	1,657
5	Olivia Cowan	Germany	1,587
6	Maja Stark	Sweden	1,516
7	Marianne Skarpnord	Norway	1,305
8	Charley Hull	England	1,210
9	Anna Nordqvist	Sweden	1,179
10	Alice Hewson	England	1,156

== Location of tournaments ==
Location of tournaments in Europe.
Major championship
National open
Regular event
Aramco Team Series
Location of tournaments outside Europe.
National open
Regular event
Aramco Team Series
Olympics and Solheim Cup

== See also ==
- 2021 LPGA Tour
- 2021 LET Access Series
