= Saudi International =

The term Saudi International may refer to:

- Saudi International (golf)
- Saudi International (squash)
