= Kristýna Napoleaová =

Czech professional golfer

Personal information
- Nationality: Czech Republic
- Born: 12 April 1996 (age 30) Pelhřimov, Czech Republic

Career
- Sport: Golf
- Turned professional: 2020
- Current tour: Ladies European Tour
- Former tour: LET Access Series
- Professional wins: 1

Number of wins by tour
- Ladies European Tour: 1

Best results in LPGA major championships
- Chevron Championship: DNP
- Women's PGA C'ship: DNP
- U.S. Women's Open: DNP
- Women's British Open: CUT: 2023
- Evian Championship: DNP

Kristýna Napoleaová (born 12 April 1996) is a Czech professional golfer and former footballer with AC Sparta Prague. She won the 2023 Amundi German Masters.

== Career ==
Napoleaová is a former football player of the Czech Republic women's national under-17 football team and a six-time champion of the Czech Women's U-15 and U-19 League with AC Sparta Prague. She took up golf in 2016 at the age of twenty, after an injury halted her football career. She turned professional just three and a half years later in 2020.

Napoleaová joined the LET Access Series in 2020, and she finished tied 4th at the 2021 Flumserberg Ladies Open. In 2021, she also played in six events on the Ladies European Tour. She made her first LET cut at the Tipsport Czech Ladies Open in the week of her fifth anniversary of starting with golf.

She finished tied 39th at LET Q-School to receive limited status for 2022, and had her breakthrough on the LET when she finished runner-up at the Aramco Saudi Ladies International, after sharing the halfway lead with eventual winner Georgia Hall.

In 2023, she won the Amundi German Masters with a birdie on the first playoff hole.

== Amateur wins ==
- 2018 Grabštejn Open

== Professional wins (1) ==
=== Ladies European Tour wins (1) ===
No.	Date	Tournament	Winning score	To par	Margin of victory	Runner-up
1	18 Jun 2023	Amundi German Masters	68-66-69-71=274	−14	Playoff	(England) Cara Gainer

LET playoff record (1–0)

No.	Year	Tournament	Opponent	Result
1	2023	Amundi German Masters	(England) Cara Gainer	Won with birdie on first extra hole
