= 2022 Ladies European Tour =

Professional women's golf tour

2022 Ladies European Tour season
- Duration: 10 February 2022 – 27 November 2022
- Number of official events: 34
- Most wins: (Sweden) Linn Grant (4)
- Order of Merit: (Sweden) Linn Grant
- Player of the Year: (Sweden) Linn Grant
- Rookie of the Year: (Sweden) Linn Grant
- Lowest stroke average: (Sweden) Maja Stark

The 2022 Ladies European Tour was a series of golf tournaments for elite female golfers from around the world. The tournaments were sanctioned by the Ladies European Tour (LET).

== Schedule ==
The table below shows the 2022 schedule. The season featured 34 events in 22 countries and a total purse of around €29 million, the greatest number of tournaments and prize money in the tour's 44-year history.

The numbers in brackets after the winners' names indicate the career wins on the Ladies European Tour, including that event, and is only shown for members of the tour.

Key

Major championships
Regular events
Team championships

Date	Tournament	Location	Winner	WWGR points	Purse (€)	Notes
13 Feb	Magical Kenya Ladies Open	Kenya	(Germany) Esther Henseleit (2)	6	300,000	
19 Mar (Note: Rescheduled from 3–6 November)	Aramco Saudi Ladies International	Saudi Arabia	(England) Georgia Hall (2)	15.5	$1,000,000	
26 Mar	Joburg Ladies Open	South Africa	(Sweden) Linn Grant (1)	6	250,000	Co-sanctioned with the Sunshine Ladies Tour
2 Apr	Investec South African Women's Open	South Africa	(South Africa) Lee-Anne Pace (11)	6	300,000	Co-sanctioned with the Sunshine Ladies Tour
10 Apr	Trust Golf Asian Mixed Cup	Thailand	(Thailand) Chanoknan Angurasaranee (n/a) (Note: Finished tied for sixth overall; for Order of Merit and World Ranking, she is credited with first-place points as it is based among the women only.) low woman	6	$750,000	Co-sanctioned with the Asian Tour with field of 72 men and 72 women playing from different tees (Note: Tour ranking and world ranking points based on finish among ladies' field only.)
16 Apr	Trust Golf Asian Mixed Stableford Challenge	Thailand	(Sweden) Maja Stark (n/c) (Note: Finished second overall; for Order of Merit and World Ranking, she is credited with first-place points as it is based among the women only.) low woman	6	$750,000	Co-sanctioned with the Asian Tour with field of 72 men and 72 women playing from different tees
24 Apr	Australian Ladies Classic – Bonville	Australia	(England) Meghan MacLaren (3)	5	240,000	Co-sanctioned with the WPGA Tour of Australasia
1 May	Women's NSW Open	Australia	(Sweden) Maja Stark (3)	5	210,000	Co-sanctioned with the WPGA Tour of Australasia
8 May	Madrid Ladies Open	Spain	(Spain) Ana Peláez (1)	6	300,000	New event
14 May (Note: Rescheduled from 17–19 March)	Aramco Team Series – Bangkok	Thailand	(Belgium) Manon De Roey (1)	14	$500,000	Aramco Team Series Individual event
21 May	Jabra Ladies Open	France	(Finland) Tiia Koivisto (1)	8	250,000	
29 May	Mithra Belgian Ladies Open	Belgium	(Sweden) Linn Grant (2)	6	200,000	Last played in 1995
4 Jun	Ladies Italian Open	Italy	(Switzerland) Morgane Métraux (1)	6	200,000	
12 Jun	Volvo Car Scandinavian Mixed	Sweden	(Sweden) Linn Grant (3)	10	$2,000,000	Co-sanctioned with the European Tour with field of 78 men and 78 women playing from different tees
18 Jun	Aramco Team Series – London	England	(England) Bronte Law (2)	15.5	$500,000	Aramco Team Series Individual event
26 Jun	Tipsport Czech Ladies Open	Czech Republic	(Czech Republic) Jana Melichová (1) (a)	6	200,000	
3 Jul	Amundi German Masters	Germany	(Sweden) Maja Stark (4)	6	300,000	Last played in 2016
10 Jul (Note: Rescheduled from 29 September – 2 October)	Estrella Damm Ladies Open	Spain	(Spain) Carlota Ciganda (6)	10	300,000	
17 Jul	Big Green Egg Open	Netherlands	(Sweden) Anna Nordqvist (5)	6	250,000	
24 Jul	The Evian Championship	France	(Canada) Brooke Henderson (n/a)	100	$6,500,000	Co-sanctioned with the LPGA Tour
31 Jul	Trust Golf Women's Scottish Open	Scotland	(Japan) Ayaka Furue (n/a)	62	$2,000,000	Co-sanctioned with the LPGA Tour
7 Aug	AIG Women's Open	Scotland	(South Africa) Ashleigh Buhai (4)	100	$6,800,000	Co-sanctioned with the LPGA Tour
14 Aug	ISPS Handa World Invitational	Northern Ireland	(Sweden) Maja Stark (5)	19	$1,500,000	Women's event co-sanctioned with the LPGA Tour
20 Aug	Aramco Team Series – Sotogrande	Spain	(United States) Nelly Korda (n/a)	19	$500,000	Aramco Team Series Individual event
28 Aug	Skaftö Open	Sweden	(Sweden) Linn Grant (4)	8	250,000	
3 Sep	Åland 100 Ladies Open	Finland	(France) Anne-Charlotte Mora (1)	6	250,000	
10 Sep	VP Bank Swiss Ladies Open	Switzerland	(England) Liz Young (1)	8	200,000	
17 Sep	Lacoste Ladies Open de France	France	(Morocco) Ines Laklalech (1)	14	325,000	
25 Sep	Women's Irish Open	Ireland	(Czech Republic) Klára Spilková (2)	15	400,000	Last played in 2012
15 Oct	Aramco Team Series – New York	United States	(United States) Lexi Thompson (n/a)	20.5	$500,000	Aramco Team Series Individual event
23 Oct	Hero Women's Indian Open	India	(Germany) Olivia Cowan (1)	6	$400,000	
~~28 Oct~~	Dubai Moonlight Classic	Dubai	Tournament cancelled		~~$285,000~~	
12 Nov	Aramco Team Series – Jeddah	Saudi Arabia	(Germany) Chiara Noja (1)	16	$500,000	Aramco Team Series Individual event
27 Nov	Andalucia Costa Del Sol Open De España	Spain	(Sweden) Caroline Hedwall (7)	16	650,000	Tour Championship, limited-field event

=== Unofficial events ===
The following events appear on the schedule, but does not carry ranking points.

Date	Tournament	Host country	Winner	Purse ($)	Notes
13 May	Aramco Team Series – Bangkok	Thailand	(Australia) Whitney Hillier (c) (Thailand) Chonlada Chayanun (Finland) Krista Bakker (Thailand) Pattanan Amatanon (a)	500,000	Aramco Team Series Team event
17 Jun	Aramco Team Series – London	England	(South Africa) Nicole Garcia (c) (Norway) Madelene Stavnar (United States) Kelly Whaley (England) Mia Baker (a)	500,000	Aramco Team Series Team event
19 Aug	Aramco Team Series – Sotogrande	Spain	(United States) Jessica Korda (c) (Finland) Noora Komulainen (Czech Republic) Tereza Melecká (England) Malcolm Borwick (a)	500,000	Aramco Team Series Team event
14 Oct	Aramco Team Series – New York	United States	(Sweden) Johanna Gustavsson (c) (Sweden) Jessica Karlsson (Germany) Karolin Lampert (United States) Jennifer Rosenberg (a)	500,000	Aramco Team Series Team event
11 Nov	Aramco Team Series – Jeddah	Saudi Arabia	(South Africa) Nicole Garcia (c) (South Africa) Casandra Alexander (Czech Republic) Tereza Melecká (Morocco) Sonia Bayahya (a)	500,000	Aramco Team Series Team event

== Order of Merit rankings ==
The top 10 players in the Race to Costa del Sol Rankings.

Rank	Player	Country	Points
1	Linn Grant	Sweden	3,625
2	Maja Stark	Sweden	3,415
3	Johanna Gustavsson	Sweden	1,946
4	Manon De Roey	Belgium	1,816
5	Ana Peláez	Spain	1,657
6	Magdalena Simmermacher	Argentina	1,570
7	Meghan MacLaren	England	1,660
8	Caroline Hedwall	Sweden	1,540
9	Lee-Anne Pace	South Africa	1,489
10	Georgia Hall	England	1,372

== Location of tournaments ==
Location of tournaments in Europe.
Major championship
National open
Regular event
Aramco Team Series
Location of tournaments outside Europe.
National open
Regular event
Aramco Team Series

== See also ==
- 2022 LPGA Tour
- 2022 LET Access Series
