= Ladies Swiss Open =

Golf tournament

Tournament information
- Location: Zug, Switzerland
- Established: 1988
- Course: Golfpark Holzhäusern
- Par: 71
- Tour: Ladies European Tour
- Format: 54-hole Stroke play
- Prize fund: €300,000

Tournament record score
- Aggregate: 194 Suzann Pettersen
- To par: −22 as above

Current champion
- (England) Eleanor Givens

The Ladies Swiss Open is a women's professional golf tournament on the Ladies European Tour that is held in Switzerland.

== History ==
The tournament was first played in 1988 and then again in 1989 near St. Moritz, and between 1990 and 1997 near Geneva. In 1990, Evelyn Orley became the first Swiss national to win the tournament.

Between 2006 and 2012, Deutsche Bank was the title sponsor, and it was played in the district of Locarno in the canton of Ticino.

After an eight-year hiatus it returned to the LET schedule again in 2020, this time near Zug and with Liechtenstein-based VP Bank as title sponsor.

== Winners ==
Year	Winner	Score	To par	Margin of victory	Runner(s)-up	Winner's share (€)	Venue
VP Bank Swiss Ladies Open
2026	(England) Eleanor Givens	68-66-66=200	−13	1 stroke	(Germany) Alexandra Försterling (Republic of Ireland) Anna Foster (Australia) Whitney Hillier	45,000	Golfpark Holzhäusern
2025	(England) Alice Hewson (2)	66-67-67=200	−13	5 strokes	(Sweden) Kajsa Arwefjäll (Switzerland) Chiara Tamburlini (Republic of Ireland) Lauren Walsh	45,000	Golfpark Holzhäusern
2024	(England) Alice Hewson	68-69-65=202	−11	Playoff	(India) Tvesa Malik	45,000	Golfpark Holzhäusern
2023	(Germany) Alexandra Försterling	66-66-66=198	−15	2 strokes	(Norway) Madelene Stavnar	45,000	Golfpark Holzhäusern
2022	(England) Liz Young	68-67-69=204	−12	1 stroke	(Sweden) Linn Grant	30,000	Golfpark Holzhäusern
2021	(Thailand) Atthaya Thitikul	68-66-66=200	−16	1 stroke	(Norway) Marianne Skarpnord	30,000	Golfpark Holzhäusern
2020	(Wales) Amy Boulden	70-65-64=199	−17	3 strokes	(Australia) Stephanie Kyriacou	30,000	Golfpark Holzhäusern
2013–2019: No tournament
Deutsche Bank Ladies Swiss Open
2012	(Scotland) Carly Booth	70-71-67-68=276	–12	Playoff	(Germany) Anja Monke	78,750	Golf Gerre Losone
2012	(Scotland) Carly Booth	70-71-67-68=276	–12	Playoff	(Germany) Caroline Masson	78,750	Golf Gerre Losone
2011	(Italy) Diana Luna	69-67-67=203	–13	1 stroke	(South Africa) Lee-Anne Pace	78,750	Golf Gerre Losone
2011	(Italy) Diana Luna	69-67-67=203	–13	1 stroke	(France) Sophie Giquel-Bettan	78,750	Golf Gerre Losone
2011	(Italy) Diana Luna	69-67-67=203	–13	1 stroke	(Australia) Kristie Smith	78,750	Golf Gerre Losone
2010	(South Africa) Lee-Anne Pace	69-67-68=204	–12	1 stroke	(Scotland) Vikki Laing	78,750	Golf Gerre Losone
2009	(Norway) Marianne Skarpnord	69-71-66-70=276	–16	1 stroke	(England) Melissa Reid	78,750	Golf Gerre Losone
2008	(Norway) Suzann Pettersen	67-63-64=194	–22	6 strokes	(South Korea) Amy Yang	78,750	Golf Gerre Losone
2007	(Germany) Bettina Hauert	68-73-72-72=285	–3	Playoff	(Australia) Anna Rawson	78,750	Golf Gerre Losone
2007	(Germany) Bettina Hauert	68-73-72-72=285	–3	Playoff	(Spain) Paula Martí	78,750	Golf Gerre Losone
2006	(France) Gwladys Nocera	69-70-63-71=276	–12	3 strokes	(United States) Laura Davies	75,000	Golf Gerre Losone
1998–2005: No tournament
Déesse Ladies' Swiss Open
1997	(France) Marie-Laure de Lorenzi	72-68-70-70=280	−8	Playoff	(England) Trish Johnson	£13,500	GC de Maison Blanche
1996	(Sweden) Sophie Gustafson	69-69-73-69=280	−8	1 stroke	(England) Lisa Hackney	£12,000	GC de Maison Blanche
1991–1995: No tournament
Bonmont Ladies Swiss Classic
1990	(Switzerland) Evelyn Orley	289	+1	Playoff	(Scotland) Gillian Stewart	£10,500	Bonmont G&CC
St Moritz Classic
1989	(England) Kitrina Douglas	286	−2	Playoff	(England) Suzanne Strudwick	£10,500	Engadine GC
St Moritz Open
1988	(New Zealand) Janice Arnold	285	−3	1 stroke	(Scotland) Cathy Panton	£9,000	Engadine GC
