= Trichat Cheenglab =

Thai professional golfer

Personal information
- Nickname: Mine
- Nationality: Thailand
- Born: 12 August 1995 (age 31) Bangkok, Thailand
- Height: 5 ft 6 in (168 cm)

Career
- Sport: Golf
- Turned professional: 2016
- Current tours: Ladies European Tour (since 2023); LPGA Tour; Thai LPGA Tour
- Professional wins: 3

Number of wins by tour
- Ladies European Tour: 1
- Other: 2

Best results in LPGA major championships
- Chevron Championship: CUT: 2024
- Women's PGA C'ship: CUT: 2024
- U.S. Women's Open: DNP
- Women's British Open: CUT: 2021, 2023, 2024
- Evian Championship: CUT: 2024

Achievements and awards
- Ladies European Tour Order of Merit: 2023
- Ladies European Tour Rookie of the Year: 2023

Trichat Cheenglab (Thai: ตรีฉัฐ จีนกลับ; born 12 August 1995) is a Thai professional golfer playing on the Ladies European Tour.

In September 2023, Cheenglab won her first Ladies European Tour title at the Big Green Egg Open in Netherlands.

Cheenglab earned her card for the 2024 LPGA Tour through qualifying school for the first time.

== Professional wins (3) ==
=== Ladies European Tour wins (1) ===
No.	Date	Tournament	Winning score	To par	Margin of victory	Runners-up	Winner's share (€)
1	10 Sep 2023	Big Green Egg Open	69-68-67=204	−12	1 stroke	(Denmark) Nicole Broch Estrup, (Wales) Lydia Hall	45,000

=== Thai LPGA Tour wins (2) ===
- 2019 (1) 5th Singha-SAT Thai LPGA Championship
- 2021 (1) Muang Thai Insurance 6th Thai LPGA Championship

== Results in LPGA majors ==
Tournament	2021	2022	2023	2024
Chevron Championship				CUT
U.S. Women's Open				
Women's PGA Championship				CUT
The Evian Championship				CUT
Women's British Open	CUT		CUT	CUT

Did not play

CUT = missed the half-way cut

=== Summary ===
Tournament	Wins	2nd	3rd	Top-5	Top-10	Top-25	Events	Cuts made
Chevron Championship	0	0	0	0	0	0	1	0
U.S. Women's Open	0	0	0	0	0	0	0	0
Women's PGA Championship	0	0	0	0	0	0	1	0
The Evian Championship	0	0	0	0	0	0	1	0
Women's British Open	0	0	0	0	0	0	3	0
Totals	0	0	0	0	0	0	6	0

== Ladies European Tour career summary ==
Year	Tournaments played	Cuts made	Wins	2nd	3rd	Top 10s	Best finish	Earnings (€)	Money list rank	Scoring average	Scoring rank
2017	1	0	0	0	0	0	CUT	0	n/a (Note: Cheenglab was not a member of the Ladies European Tour before the 2023 season, so she was not included on the official money list or scoring average rankings in those seasons.)	n/a	n/a
2018	1	1	0	0	0	0	T47	1,530	n/a	n/a	n/a
2019	2	2	0	0	0	0	T12	11,486	n/a	n/a	n/a
2021	2	0	0	0	0	0	CUT	0	n/a	n/a	n/a
2022	5	2	0	0	0	2	T8	2,220	n/a	n/a	n/a
2023	24	22	1	2	0	7	1	247,069	17	71.87	T28
2024	19	15	0	0	0	3	T5	107,998	50	72.88	T89
2025	20	13	0	1	0	2	T2	168,595	43	72.33	39
Totals	74	55	1	3	0	14	1	538,898			
