= 2020 Ladies European Tour =

Professional women's golf tour

2020 Ladies European Tour season
- Duration: February 2020 – November 2020
- Number of official events: 25 (13 cancelled)
- Most wins: (Denmark) Emily Kristine Pedersen (4)
- Order of Merit: (Denmark) Emily Kristine Pedersen
- Player of the Year: (Denmark) Emily Kristine Pedersen
- Rookie of the Year: (New Zealand) Stephanie Kyriacou
- Lowest stroke average: (Denmark) Emily Kristine Pedersen

The 2020 Ladies European Tour was a series of golf tournaments for elite female golfers from around the world. The tournaments were sanctioned by the Ladies European Tour (LET).

The season was affected by the COVID-19 pandemic with many tournaments either being postponed or cancelled. Among the cancellations was The Evian Championship, one of the LPGA Tour's five major championships.

== Schedule ==
The table below shows part of the 2020 schedule. The numbers in brackets after the winners' names indicate the career wins on the Ladies European Tour, including that event, and is only shown for members of the tour.

Key

Major championships
Regular events
Team championships

Date	Tournament	Location	Winner (Note: (a) – Amateur)	WWGR points	Purse	Other tours (Note: ALPG − ALPG Tour, EUR − European Tour, LPGA − LPGA Tour, SLT − Sunshine Ladies Tour.)	Notes
23 Feb	Australian Ladies Classic Bonville	Australia	(Australia) Stephanie Kyriacou (n/a,a)	10	€240,000	ALPG	
1 Mar	Women's NSW Open	Australia	(Sweden) Julia Engström (1)	6	€210,000	ALPG	
14 Mar	Investec South African Women's Open	South Africa	(England) Alice Hewson (1)	6	€200,000	SLT	
~~17 May~~	La Reserva de Sotogrande Invitational	Spain	Postponed	–			
~~31 May~~	Mithra Belgian Ladies Open	Belgium	Cancelled	–			
~~7 Jun~~	Lalla Meryem Cup	Morocco	Postponed	–			
~~14 Jun~~	Scandinavian Mixed	Sweden	Cancelled	–		EUR	New event
~~20 Jun~~ (~~9 May~~)	Jabra Ladies Open	France	Postponed	–			
~~5 Jul~~	Dutch Ladies Open	Netherlands	Cancelled	–			
~~19 Jul~~	Estrella Damm Mediterranean Ladies Open	Spain	Postponed	–			
~~9 Aug~~ (~~26 Jul~~)	Evian Championship	France	Cancelled	–		LPGA	
~~9 Aug~~	ISPS Handa World Invitational	Northern Ireland	Cancelled	–			New event
16 Aug	Aberdeen Standard Investments Ladies Scottish Open	Scotland	(United States) Stacy Lewis (n/a)	34	$1,500,000	LPGA	
23 Aug	AIG Women's British Open	England	(Germany) Sophia Popov (1)	100	$4,500,000	LPGA	
30 Aug	Tipsport Czech Ladies Open	Czech Republic	(Denmark) Emily Kristine Pedersen (2)	6	€200,000		
~~6 Sep~~	Creekhouse Ladies Open	Sweden	Cancelled	–			New event
12 Sep	VP Bank Swiss Ladies Open	Switzerland	(Wales) Amy Boulden (1)	6	€200,000		
19 Sep	Lacoste Ladies Open de France	France	(Sweden) Julia Engström (2)	6	€200,000		
~~27 Sep~~	Ladies European Thailand Championship	Thailand	Cancelled	–			
~~4 Oct~~	Hero Women's Indian Open	India	Cancelled	–			
6 Nov	Omega Dubai Moonlight Classic	United Arab Emirates	(Australia) Minjee Lee (2)	16.5	€260,000		
~~15 Nov~~	Magical Kenya Ladies Open	Kenya	Cancelled	–			
15 Nov (Note: Rescheduled due to the COVID-19 pandemic.) (~~11 Oct~~) (~~22 Mar~~)	Aramco Saudi Ladies International	Saudi Arabia	(Denmark) Emily Kristine Pedersen (3)	14	$1,000,000		New event
19 Nov	Saudi Ladies Team International	Saudi Arabia	(Denmark) Emily Kristine Pedersen (4)	14	$200,000		New event; Aramco Team Series Individual event
29 Nov	Andalucia Costa Del Sol Open De España	Spain	(Denmark) Emily Kristine Pedersen (5)	6	€600,000		

=== Unofficial events ===
The following events appear on the schedule, but does not carry ranking points.

Date	Tournament	Host country	Winner(s)	Purse	Notes
~~8 Aug~~	Olympic women's golf competition	Japan	Postponed until 2021	–	
19 Nov	Saudi Ladies Team International	Saudi Arabia	(Denmark) Emily Kristine Pedersen (c) (South Africa) Casandra Hall (Scotland) Michele Thomson (England) Matt Selby (a)	$300,000	Aramco Team Series Team event

== Order of Merit rankings ==
Rank	Player	Country	Points
1	Emily Kristine Pedersen	Denmark	1,249.35
2	Julia Engström	Sweden	415.70
3	Stephanie Kyriacou	Australia	323.78
4	Manon De Roey	Belgium	317.45
5	Sanna Nuutinen	Finland	312.56
6	Azahara Muñoz	Spain	272.96
7	Nuria Iturrioz	Spain	256.02
8	Georgia Hall	England	255.37
9	Anne Van Dam	Netherlands	234.46
10	Laura Fünfstück	Germany	233.17

== Location of tournaments ==
Location of tournaments in Europe.
Major championship
National open
Regular event

Location of tournaments outside Europe.
National open
Regular event
Aramco Team Series
Olympics

== See also ==
- 2020 LPGA Tour
- 2020 LET Access Series
