= Kiera Floyd =

South African professional golfer

Personal information
- Nickname: Ki
- Nationality: South Africa
- Born: 6 October 2004 (age 22) Kempton Park, South Africa
- Height: 168 cm (5 ft 6 in)

Career
- Sport: Golf
- Turned professional: 2023
- Current tour: Sunshine Ladies Tour (joined 2023)
- Professional wins: 1

Kiera Floyd (born 6 October 2004) is a South African professional golfer and Sunshine Ladies Tour player. She won the 2025 Platinum Ladies Open.

== Early life and amateur career ==
Floyd was introduced to golf by her mother, a tennis pro, and started playing at an early age. She has four sisters and one brother and has been attached to Benoni Country Club and Ebotse Golf Estate. She first started playing competitively on the 2012 SA Kids Tour, at the age of seven, and went on to win 20 tournaments. At nine, she represented South Africa at the 2014 World Kids Championship in North Carolina.

Floyd made junior golf history in 2018 when she beat a predominantly male field at Royal Johannesburg & Kensington Golf Club East Course with a seven-under 65 at the to become the first female champion on the Bridge Fund Managers Junior Series. She was runner-up at the 2019 South African Girls Championship, a stroke behind Caitlyn Macnab.

A 14-year-old Floyd finished third at the 2019 Jabra Ladies Classic at Glendower Golf Club, behind only Anne-Lise Caudal and Nobuhle Dlamini.

She won the 2022 South African Women's Amateur Stroke Play Championship at Royal Johannesburg & Kensington Golf Club.

== Professional career ==
Floyd tuned professional at 18 in 2023, and joined the Sunshine Ladies Tour. In her rookie season, she finished runner-up at the Cape Town Ladies Open, 3 strokes behind Hayley Davis, and she was in contention at the Standard Bank Ladies Open to ultimately finished 3rd, a stroke away from joining the playoff between Lee-Anne Pace and Stacy Bregman.

She participated in Ladies European Tour co-sanctioned events, and tied for 4th at the Joburg Ladies Open at Modderfontein Golf Club in 2023, 3 strokes behind winner Lily May Humphreys, and finished 6th at the 2025 edition, 5 strokes behind winner Mimi Rhodes.

In 2025, Floyd shot a final round of 60 to capture her maiden professional title at the Platinum Ladies Open ahead of Hayley Davis, before she was in contention at the South African Women's Open and ultimately finished 5th.

Round of 60

Hole	1	2	3	4	5	6	7	8	9	Front	10	11	12	13	14	15	16	17	18	Back	Total
Yards	514	418	183	421	531	144	363	166	331	3071	491	175	376	490	422	365	381	153	378	3231	6302
Par	5	4	3	4	5	3	4	3	4	35	5	3	4	5	4	4	4	3	4	36	71
Shots	5	3	2	3	4	3	3	2	4	29	3	3	3	4	4	4	4	3	3	31	60
To par	E	−1	−2	−3	−4	−4	−5	−6	−6	−6	−8	−8	−9	−10	−10	−10	−10	−10	−11	−11	−11

Floyd finished 2nd in the 2025 Sunshine Ladies Tour Order of Merit behind Casandra Alexander.

== Amateur wins ==
- 2018 Gauteng North Championship, Mpumalanga Championship, KwaZulu-Natal Junior Championship
- 2020 North West Championship, Mpumalanga Championship
- 2021 Gauteng North Championship, Ekurhuleni Open, Ackerman Championship
- 2022 South African Women's Amateur Stroke Play Championship

== Professional wins (1) ==
=== Sunshine Ladies Tour wins (1) ===
No.	Date	Tournament	Winning score	Margin of victory	Runner-up	Ref
1	21 Mar 2025	Platinum Ladies Open	−15 (71-67-60=198)	1 stroke	(England) Hayley Davis	

== Team appearances ==
Amateur

- South African Women's Inter-Provincial (representing Gauteng): 2017, 2018, 2019, 2021
- Astor Trophy (representing South Africa): 2019
- Junior Golf World Cup (representing South Africa): 2019
