= Leján Lewthwaite =

South African professional golfer

Personal information
- Nationality: South Africa
- Born: 12 February 1991 (age 35) Benoni, South Africa
- Height: 5 ft 3 in (1.60 m)

Career
- Sport: Golf
- College: Texas State University
- Turned professional: 2016
- Current tours: LET (joined 2019); Sunshine Ladies Tour
- Former tour: LET Access Series (joined 2017)
- Professional wins: 5

Leján Lewthwaite (born 12 February 1991) is a South African professional golfer who plays on the Ladies European Tour.

== Amateur career ==
Lewthwaite was born in Benoni, Gauteng and was 9 years old when she picked up her first club, but only started focusing on golf after she turned 17 and attended the Gavin Levenson Golf Academy. In 2011 she was offered a full golf scholarship to Texas State University, where she won her first NCAA division 1 collegiate tournament in just her second start.

She graduated with a BSc degree (cum laude) in 2015 and returned to South Africa.

== Professional career ==
Lewthwaite turned professional at the start of 2016. She competed in eight tournaments in the 2017 LET Access Series with a best finish being T10 at the Foxconn Czech Ladies Challenge. In 2018 she played in four LET events and then earned her Ladies European Tour card for 2019 by finishing T10 at qualifying school. In 2019 she played in 12 events and made seven cuts, recording two top-10 finishes including a season-best finish of ninth at the Jabra Ladies Open, to retained her card.

Lewthwaite also played on the Sunshine Ladies Tour where she secured her first professional title at the 2019 South African Women's Masters. In 2020 she claimed back-to-back victories at the SuperSport Ladies Challenge, held at Gary Player Country Club, and the Dimension Data Ladies Pro-Am, held at Fancourt Hotel and Country Club.

In 2020 she recorded a season-best finish of T16 at the Investec South African Women's Open, held at Westlake Golf Club, and in 2021 she was T7 at the Ladies Italian Open, three strokes off the lead.

Lewthwaite is supported by Investec, the title sponsor of the South African Women's Open, along with compatriots Nicole Garcia and Stacy Bregman.

== Amateur wins (1) ==
- 2011 Johnny Imes Invitational

== Professional wins (5) ==
=== Sunshine Ladies Tour wins (4) ===
No.	Date	Tournament	Winning score	Margin of victory	Runner-up	Ref
1	21 Feb 2019	South African Women's Masters	−1 (75-73-67=215)	Playoff	(South Africa) Kajal Mistry (a)	
2	4 Feb 2020	SuperSport Ladies Challenge	−6 (66-71-73=210)	Playoff	(South Africa) Tandi McCallum	
3	14 Feb 2020	Dimension Data Ladies Pro-Am	−9 (66-68-73=207)	8 strokes	(South Africa) Stacy Bregman	
4	26 Jan 2022	Vodacom Origins of Golf Ladies Final	E (69-75=144)			

=== LET Access Series wins (1) ===
No.	Date	Tournament	Winning score	Margin of victory	Runner-up	Ref
1	16 Sep 2023	Hauts de France - Pas de Calais Golf Open	−11 (71-69-68=208)	Playoff	(Slovenia) Katja Pogačar	
