= Jabra Ladies Classic =

Golf tournament on the Sunshine Ladies Tour in South Africa

Tournament information
- Location: Gauteng, South Africa
- Established: 2014
- Course: Glendower Golf Club
- Par: 72
- Tour: Sunshine Ladies Tour
- Format: Stroke play
- Prize fund: R 1,000,000
- Month played: February/March

Tournament record score
- Aggregate: 199 Ashleigh Buhai (2020)
- To par: −17 as above

Current champion
- (France) Lois Lau

Location map
- Location in South Africa Location in Gauteng

The Jabra Ladies Classic is a women's professional golf tournament held at Glendower Golf Club near Johannesburg, South Africa. It has been an event on the Southern Africa-based Sunshine Ladies Tour since 2014.

The 2022 event saw a battle between LPGA Tour players Paula Reto and Linn Grant for the title, with Grant coming out on top after a birdie on the final hole. Grant had already signalled a warning to the field when she fired a round of 62 in the pro-am on Tuesday.

== Winners ==
Year	Winner	Score	Margin of victory	Runner(s)-up	Note
Jabra Ladies Classic
2026	(France) Lois Lau	−9 (71-67-69=207)	Playoff	(South Africa) Danielle du Toit (Scotland) Lorna McClymont	
2025	(South Africa) Casandra Alexander (2)	−14 (71-64-67=202)	4 strokes	(Scotland) Lorna McClymont	
2024	(South Africa) Cara Gorlei	−12 (68-68-68=204)	1 stroke	(Sweden) Lisa Pettersson	
2023	(South Africa) Casandra Alexander	−14 (66-70-66=202)	1 stroke	(Spain) Mireia Prat	
2022	(Sweden) Linn Grant	−10 (69-72-65=206)	2 strokes	(South Africa) Paula Reto	
2021	(South Africa) Caitlyn Macnab (a)	−12 (69-68-67=204)	8 strokes	(South Africa) Lindi Coetzee (South Africa) Nicole Garcia	
2020	(South Africa) Ashleigh Buhai (2)	−17 (63-69-67=199)	5 strokes	(South Africa) Stacy Bregman	
2019	(France) Anne-Lise Caudal	−4 (71-68-73=212)	2 strokes	(Eswatini) Nobuhle Dlamini	
2018	No tournament				
Sunshine Ladies Tour Classic
2017	(South Korea) Carrie Park	−5 (72-69-70=211)	Playoff	(Eswatini) Nobuhle Dlamini	
2016	No tournament				
Chase to Investec Cup Glendower
2015	(South Africa) Nicole Garcia	−6 (67-71=138)	4 strokes	(South Africa) Ivana Samu (a)	
2014	(South Africa) Ashleigh Simon	−9 (70-65=135)	4 strokes	(South Africa) Stacy Bregman	
