= Nadia van der Westhuizen =

South African professional golfer (born 2001)

Personal information
- Nationality: South Africa
- Born: 16 November 2001 (age 24) Kempton Park, South Africa
- Height: 165 cm (5 ft 5 in)

Career
- Sport: Golf
- Turned professional: 2021
- Current tours: Ladies European Tour (joined 2026); Sunshine Ladies Tour (joined 2021)
- Professional wins: 3

Nadia van der Westhuizen (born 16 November 2001) is a South African professional golfer who plays on the Sunshine Ladies Tour and Ladies European Tour.

== Amateur career ==
Van der Westhuizen grew up in Kempton Park, South Africa. She was introduced to golf by her father around the age of 8, and is attached to Serengeti Golf Estate.

In 2021, she reached a third-place in the South African Women's Stroke Play Championship, and won her first provincial title in the North West Open Championship.

== Professional career ==
Van der Westhuizen turned professional in 2021 and joined the Sunshine Ladies Tour. She captured her maiden title at the 2022 SunBet Cape Town Ladies Open, a stroke ahead of the likes of Stacy Bregman and Lee-Anne Pace.

In 2025, she won the SuperSport Ladies Challenge at Gary Player Country Club in Sun City. She won the 2026 ABSA Ladies Invitational at Royal Johannesburg & Kensington Golf Club in dominant fashion, seven strokes ahead of her nearest competitor.

Van der Westhuizen earned conditional status for the 2026 Ladies European Tour at Q-School, having missed out on a card the previous year by three shots. She had previously recorded top-10 finishes at the Joburg Ladies Open in 2023 and 2024.

== Amateur wins ==
- 2021 North West Open Championship

== Professional wins (3) ==
=== Sunshine Ladies Tour wins (3) ===
| No. | Date | Tournament | Winning score | Margin of victory | Runner(s)-up |
|---|---|---|---|---|---|
| 1 | 4 Feb 2022 | SunBet Cape Town Ladies Open | +4 (77-76-73=226) | 1 stroke | (South Africa) Stacy Bregman, (South Africa) Cara Gorlei (South Africa) Tandi McCallum, (South Africa) Lee-Anne Pace |
| 2 | 7 Mar 2025 | SuperSport Ladies Challenge | −3 (71-68-74=213) | 1 stroke | (South Africa) Kaiyuree Moodley |
| 3 | 28 Mar 2026 | ABSA Ladies Invitational | −17 (65-68-66=199) | 7 strokes | (South Africa) Jordan Rothman |
