= NTT Data Ladies Pro-Am =

Golf tournament on the Sunshine Ladies Tour in Johannesburg, South Africa

NTT Ladies Pro-Am
Tournament information
- Location: George, Western Cape, South Africa
- Established: 2014
- Courses: George Golf Club (R1 & R2); Fancourt Country Club (R3)
- Par: 72
- Tour: Sunshine Ladies Tour
- Format: Stroke play
- Prize fund: R 2,500,000 (Individual); R 100,000 (Team)
- Month played: February/March

Tournament record score
- Aggregate: 205 Lee-Anne Pace (2016)
- To par: −11 as above

Current champion
- (Germany) Celina Sattelkau

Location map
- Location in South Africa Location in Western Cape

The NTT Data Ladies Pro-Am is a women's professional golf tournament held in Western Cape, South Africa. It is an event on the Southern Africa-based Sunshine Ladies Tour since 2014, played concurrently with the men's Dimension Data Pro-Am on the Sunshine Tour.

The professional golfers are teamed with an amateur and together they compete for the Dimension Data Ladies Pro-Am trophy. They compete using the Better Ball Medal scoring system with the amateur handicaps taken into account.

Except for 2015 when the event was hosted at Oubaai Golf Resort & Spa, the tournament has been played over three days on two different golf courses, the first two rounds at George Golf Club, with the third and final round at Fancourt Hotel and Country Club.

In 2021 the tournament had a revised format, without the pro-am element, in observance of the coronavirus health protocols and restrictions. The ladies field did not play at the George Golf Club but joined the men playing the Outeniqua and Montagu courses at Fancourt on alternating days for the first and second rounds, before playing the final round at the Outeniqua as per previous years.

== Winners ==
Individual

Year	Winner	Score	Margin of victory	Runner(s)-up	Note
NTT Data Ladies Pro-Am
2026	(Germany) Celina Sattelkau	−7 (67-72=139)	5 strokes	(Germany) Sophie Witt	
2025	(South Africa) Danielle du Toit	−10 (69-70-67=206)	Playoff	(South Africa) Lee-Anne Pace	
Dimension Data Ladies Challenge
2024	(Scotland) Kylie Henry	−3 (72-70-71=213)	2 strokes	(South Africa) Lee-Anne Pace	
2023	(Sweden) Moa Folke	−8 (71-73-64=208)	3 strokes	(France) Anne-Lise Caudal	
2022	(Sweden) Linn Grant	−10 (72-67-67=206)	7 strokes	(South Africa) Nicole Garcia	
2021	(Norway) Marianne Skarpnord	−1 (73-70-72=215)	Playoff	(South Africa) Casandra Hall (South Africa) Lee-Anne Pace (Germany) Olivia Cowan	
2020	(South Africa) Leján Lewthwaite	−9 (66-68-73=207)	8 strokes	(South Africa) Stacy Bregman	
2019	(Eswatini) Nobuhle Dlamini	−2 (76-71-67=214)	2 strokes	(South Africa) Leján Lewthwaite (South Africa) Ivanna Samu	
2018	(South Korea) Carrie Park	−8 (68-70-70=208)	5 strokes	(South Africa) Stacy Bregman	
2017	(South Africa) Nicole Garcia	−10 (68-71-67=206)	3 strokes	(South Africa) Tandi McCallum	
2016	(South Africa) Lee-Anne Pace	−11 (67-68-70=205)	3 strokes	(South Africa) Monique Smit	
2015	(South Africa) Stacy Bregman	−1 (72-71=143)	1 stroke	(South Africa) Melissa Eaton	
2014	(South Africa) Monique Smit	−9 (63-72=135)	2 strokes	(South Africa) Ashleigh Simon	

Team event

Year	Winner	Score	Margin of victory	Runner(s)-up	Note
NTT Data Ladies Pro-Am Trophy
2026	(South Africa) Caitlyn Macnab & Cherise van der Walt (a)	−14 (61-71=132)	1 stroke	(Iceland) Gudrun Bjorgvinsdottir & Courtney Pulford (a)	
2025	(South Africa) Cara Gorlei & Sylvia Maponyane (a)	−18 (65-68-65=198)	Playoff	(South Africa) Lee-Anne Pace & Lisa Louw (a)	
Dimension Data Ladies Pro-Am Trophy
2024	(Isle of Man) Ana Dawson & Theresa Shindehutte (a)	−16 (64-66-70=200)	6 strokes	(Scotland) Kylie Henry & Max Mofokeng (a)	
2023	(Czech Republic) Kristýna Napoleaová & Ngwako Ramohlale (a)	−13 (68-68-67=203)	Playoff	(France) Anne-Lise Caudal & Tracy Coetzer (a)	
2022	(Sweden) Linn Grant & Colleen Anderson (a)	−20 (67-66-63=196)	3 strokes	(South Africa) Nicole Garcia & Vanessa Jackson (a)	
2021	Cancelled due to the Covid-19 pandemic				
2020	(India) Sharmila Nicollet & Nicci Taylor (a)	−15 (71-66-64=201)	1 stroke	(South Africa) Leján Lewthwaite & Marjorie Davidson (a)	
2019	(Eswatini) Nobuhle Dlamini & Frances Tremearne (a)	−11 (72-67-66=205)	Playoff	(South Africa) Alana van Greuning & Tessa Hinton (a) (South Africa) Crizelda van Niekerk & Ash Pagden (a)	
2018	(South Korea) Carrie Park & Louise del Balzo (a)	−22 (65-66-63=194)	5 strokes	(Switzerland) Valeria Martinoli & Simona Stanton (a)	
2017	(South Korea) Carrie Park & Ladina King (a)	−15 (65-69-67=201)	2 strokes	(South Africa) Tandi von Ruben & Joanne McLeod (a)	

== See also ==
- Dimension Data Pro-Am
