= 2014 Sunshine Ladies Tour =

Inaugural season of the Sunshine Ladies Tour

2014 Sunshine Ladies Tour season
- Duration: April 2013 – March 2014
- Number of official events: 9
- Most wins: 3: (South Africa) Ashleigh Simon
- Order of Merit winner: (South Africa) Lee-Anne Pace

The 2014 Sunshine Ladies Tour was the inaugural season of the Sunshine Ladies Tour, a series of professional golf tournaments for women based in South Africa.

The season featured six 36-holes stroke play tournaments with no cut, each with a purse of R100,000. The leading players on the Order of Merit competed for Investec Cup for Ladies in March, with a purse of R300,000.

== Schedule ==
The season consisted of 10 events, nine in South Africa and one in Zambia, played between April 2013 and March 2014.

| Date | Tournament | Venue | Winner | Purse (ZAR) | Notes |
|---|---|---|---|---|---|
| Apr 21 | South African Women's Open | Southbroom Golf Club | (Norway) Marianne Skarpnord | €290,000 | Co-sanctioned with the LET |
| Feb 14 | Chase to Investec Cup Houghton | Houghton Golf Club | (South Africa) Kim Williams | 100,000 | |
| Feb 17 | Sun International Ladies Challenge | Lost City Golf Course | (South Africa) Tandi von Ruben | 100,000 | |
| Feb 23 | Dimension Data Ladies Challenge | Oubaai Golf Club & Fancourt - Outeniqua | (South Africa) Monique Smit | 150,000 | |
| Feb 28 | Chase to Investec Cup Glendower | Glendower Golf Club | (South Africa) Ashleigh Simon | 100,000 | |
| Mar 3 | Ladies Tshwane Open | Els Club, Copperleaf | (South Africa) Ashleigh Simon | 100,000 | |
| Mar 7 | SuperSport Ladies Challenge | Observatory Golf Club | (South Africa) Monique Smit | 100,000 | |
| Mar 14 | Chase to Investec Cup Blue Valley | Blue Valley Golf Estate | (South Africa) Ashleigh Simon | 100,000 | |
| Mar 23 | Investec Ladies Cup | Millvale Private Retreat | (South Africa) Lee-Anne Pace | 300,000 | Limited field event (Note: The leading 10 players on the Order of Merit competed for the Investec Ladies Cup.) |
| Mar 30 | Zambia Ladies Open | (Zambia) Ndola Golf Club | (South Africa) Stacy Bregman | 400,000 | |

== Order of Merit ==
This shows the leaders in the final Order of Merit.

| Rank | Player |
|---|---|
| 1 | (South Africa) Lee-Anne Pace |
| 2 | (South Africa) Monique Smit |
| 3 | (South Africa) Tandi von Ruben |
| 4 | (South Africa) Ashleigh Simon |
| 5 | (South Africa) Nicole Garcia |
