= Cape Town Ladies Open =

Golf tournament on the Sunshine Ladies Tour in South Africa

Tournament information
- Location: Cape Town, South Africa
- Established: 2015
- Course: Durbanville Golf Club
- Par: 72
- Tour: Sunshine Ladies Tour
- Format: Stroke play
- Prize fund: R 1,000,000
- Month played: February/March

Tournament record score
- Aggregate: 206 Lee-Anne Pace (2016)
- To par: −16 as above

Current champion
- (South Africa) Danielle du Toit

Location map
- Location in South Africa Location in Western Cape

The Cape Town Ladies Open is a golf tournament on the Sunshine Ladies Tour held in Cape Town, South Africa.

It has been played annually at Royal Cape Golf Club since 2015, except in 2020 when it was played at the King David Mowbray Golf Club, in 2023 when it was held at Atlantic Beach Links & Golf Club, and in 2025 at Durbanville Golf Club.

Standard Bank became title sponsor in 2024.

== Winners ==
Year	Winner	Score	Margin of victory	Runner(s)-up	Venue	Note
Standard Bank Ladies Open hosted by the City of Cape Town
2026	(South Africa) Danielle du Toit	–4 (71-69-72=212)	1 stroke	(Northern Ireland) Olivia Mehaffey (Netherlands) Romy Meekers	Durbanville Golf Club	
2025	(France) Lucie Malchirand	–12 (64-68-72=204)	4 strokes	(South Africa) Casandra Alexander (Netherlands) Romy Meekers	Durbanville Golf Club	
2024	(South Africa) Gabrielle Venter	–9 (74-69-70=213)	1 stroke	(Scotland) Kylie Henry (France) Emie Peronnin	Royal Cape Golf Club	
Cape Town Ladies Open
2023	(England) Hayley Davis	+12 (77-78-73=228)	3 strokes	(South Africa) Kiera Floyd	Atlantic Beach Links & Golf Club	
SunBet Cape Town Ladies Open
2022	(South Africa) Nadia van der Westhuizen	+4 (77-76-73=226)	1 stroke	(South Africa) Stacy Lee Bregman (South Africa) Cara Gorlei (South Africa) Tandi McCallum (South Africa) Lee-Anne Pace	Royal Cape Golf Club	
Cape Town Ladies Open
2021	(France) Manon Gidali	–4 (74-71-73=218)	Playoff	(South Africa) Cara Gorlei	Royal Cape Golf Club	
2020	(South Africa) Lee-Anne Pace (3)	–8 (72-69-67=208)	5 strokes	(Eswatini) Nobuhle Dlamini	King David Mowbray Golf Club	
2019	(South Korea) Carrie Park	–7 (72-73-70=215)	5 strokes	(France) Anne-Lise Caudal (South Africa) Kajal Mistry (a)	Royal Cape Golf Club	
2018	(South Africa) Lee-Anne Pace (2)	–8 (71-72-71=214)	Playoff	(France) Anne-Lise Caudal	Royal Cape Golf Club	
2017	(South Africa) Ashleigh Buhai	–8 (71-68-75=214)	Playoff	(South Africa) Lee-Anne Pace	Royal Cape Golf Club	
2016	(South Africa) Lee-Anne Pace	–16 (69-70-67=206)	3 strokes	(South Africa) Ashleigh Buhai	Royal Cape Golf Club	
2015	(South Africa) Stacy Lee Bregman	–4 (73-71=144)	2 strokes	(England) Lucy Williams	Royal Cape Golf Club	

== See also ==
- Cape Town Open
