= 2023 Sunshine Ladies Tour =

10th season of the Sunshine Ladies Tour

2023 Sunshine Ladies Tour season
- Duration: 1 February 2023 – 29 April 2023
- Number of official events: 7
- Order of Merit winner: (England) Lily May Humphreys

The 2023 Sunshine Ladies Tour was the 10th season of the Sunshine Ladies Tour, a series of professional golf tournaments for women based in South Africa.

== Schedule ==
The season consisted of 7 events, all held in South Africa, played between February and April.

The Dimension Data Ladies Pro-Am, played concurrent with the Sunshine Tour and Challenge Tour's co-sanctioned Dimension Data Pro-Am, had its purse significantly bumped to R2.5m.

The Investec South African Women's Open and the Joburg Ladies Open were again co-sanctioned with the Ladies European Tour.

Standard Bank sponsored a new event at Royal Johannesburg & Kensington Golf Club, added to the schedule after the regular season had concluded and not counted towards the Order of Merit.

| Date | Tournament | Venue | Winner | Purse (ZAR) | Notes |
|---|---|---|---|---|---|
| 3 Feb | SuperSport Ladies Challenge | Gary Player Country Club | (South Africa) Casandra Alexander | 1,300,000 | |
| 12 Feb | Dimension Data Ladies Pro-Am | Fancourt Country Club | (Sweden) Moa Folke (Czech Republic) Kristýna Napoleaová & Ngwako Ramohlale (a) | 2,500,000; 100,000 | |
| 17 Feb | Cape Town Ladies Open | Atlantic Beach Links | (England) Hayley Davis | 400,000 | |
| 24 Feb | Jabra Ladies Classic | Glendower Golf Club | (South Africa) Casandra Alexander | 1,000,000 | |
| 4 Mar | Joburg Ladies Open | Modderfontein Golf Club | (England) Lily May Humphreys | €300,000 | Co-sanctioned with the Ladies European Tour |
| 11 Mar | Investec South African Women's Open | Steenberg Golf Club | (South Africa) Ashleigh Buhai | €320,000 | Co-sanctioned with the Ladies European Tour |
| 29 Apr | Standard Bank Ladies Open | Royal Johannesburg & Kensington Golf Club | (South Africa) Stacy Bregman | 1,100,000 | New event |

== Order of Merit ==
This shows the leaders in the final Order of Merit.

| Rank | Player | Points |
|---|---|---|
| 1 | (England) Lily May Humphreys | 2,681 |
| 2 | (South Africa) Casandra Alexander | 2,171 |
| 3 | (Sweden) Moa Folke | 2,121 |
| 4 | (South Africa) Kaleigh Telfer | 1,517 |
| 5 | (South Africa) Lee-Anne Pace | 1,363 |
