= 2022 Sunshine Ladies Tour =

9th season of the Sunshine Ladies Tour

2022 Sunshine Ladies Tour season
- Duration: January 2022 – April 2022
- Number of official events: 7
- Order of Merit winner: (Sweden) Linn Grant

The 2022 Sunshine Ladies Tour was the 9th season of the Sunshine Ladies Tour, a series of professional golf tournaments for women based in South Africa.

== Schedule ==
The season consisted of 7 events, all held in South Africa, played between January and April.

The Investec South African Women's Open was again co-sanctioned with the Ladies European Tour, as was the Joburg Ladies Open for the first time.

Date	Tournament	Venue	Winner	Purse (ZAR)	Notes
27 Jan	VOG Final Ladies Pro-Am	Gary Player Country Club	(South Africa) Leján Lewthwaite	100,000	
4 Feb	SunBet Cape Town Ladies Open	Royal Cape Golf Club	(South Africa) Nadia van der Westhuizen	400,000	
13 Feb	Dimension Data Ladies Pro-Am	Fancourt - Outeniqua	(Sweden) Linn Grant (Sweden) Linn Grant & Colleen Anderson (a)	600,000; 100,000	
18 Feb	SuperSport Ladies Challenge	Gary Player Country Club	(South Africa) Paula Reto	1,300,000	
25 Feb	Jabra Ladies Classic	Glendower Golf Club	(Sweden) Linn Grant	1,000,000	
26 Mar	Joburg Ladies Open	Modderfontein Golf Club	(Sweden) Linn Grant	€250,000	Co-sanctioned with the Ladies European Tour
2 Apr	Investec South African Women's Open	Steenberg Golf Club	(South Africa) Lee-Anne Pace	€290,000	Co-sanctioned with the Ladies European Tour

== Order of Merit ==
This shows the leaders in the final Order of Merit.

Rank	Player	Points
1	(Sweden) Linn Grant	3,240
2	(South Africa) Lee-Anne Pace	2,456
3	(South Africa) Paula Reto	1,650
4	(South Africa) Casandra Alexander	1,641
5	(South Africa) Nicole Garcia	1,318
