= 2021 Sunshine Ladies Tour =

8th season of the Sunshine Ladies Tour

2021 Sunshine Ladies Tour season
- Duration: April 2021 – May 2021
- Number of official events: 6
- Order of Merit winner: (South Africa) Lee-Anne Pace

The 2021 Sunshine Ladies Tour was the 8th season of the Sunshine Ladies Tour, a series of professional golf tournaments for women based in South Africa.

== Schedule ==
The condensed season consisted of 6 events, all held in South Africa, played in April and May, after having been postponed from February–March due to the COVID-19 pandemic.

The Investec South African Women's Open was again co-sanctioned with the Ladies European Tour, and also a qualifier for the 2021 U.S. Women's Open.

Date	Tournament	Venue	Winner	Purse (ZAR)	Notes
9 Apr	Cape Town Ladies Open	Royal Cape Golf Club	(France) Manon Gidali	200,000	
16 Apr	Jabra Ladies Classic	Glendower Golf Club	(South Africa) Caitlyn Macnab (a)	600,000	
23 Apr	SuperSport Ladies Challenge	Gary Player Country Club	(South Africa) Michaela Fletcher	400,000	
30 Apr	Joburg Ladies Open	Soweto Country Club	(South Africa) Casandra Hall	500,000	
8 May	Dimension Data Ladies Pro-Am	Fancourt Country Club	(Norway) Marianne Skarpnord	600,000	
16 May	Investec South African Women's Open	Westlake Golf Club	(South Africa) Lee-Anne Pace	€200,000	Co-sanctioned with the Ladies European Tour

== Order of Merit ==
This shows the leaders in the final Order of Merit.

Rank	Player	Points
1	(South Africa) Lee-Anne Pace	1,353
2	(South Africa) Casandra Hall	1,213
3	(South Africa) Michaela Fletcher	822
4	(Norway) Marianne Skarpnord	744
5	(South Africa) Nicole Garcia	697
