= Pam Golding Ladies International =

Golf tournament in South Africa

Tournament information
- Location: South Africa
- Established: 2003
- Course: Nelspruit Golf Club
- Par: 72
- Tours: Ladies African Tour; Nedbank Women's Golf Tour
- Format: Stroke play
- Prize fund: R 300,000
- Month played: March
- Final year: 2008

Tournament record score
- Aggregate: 208 Lee-Anne Pace (2007)
- To par: −11 as above

Final champion
- (South Africa) Stacy Bregman

Location map
- Location in South Africa Location in Mpumalanga

The Pam Golding Ladies International was a golf tournament on the Ladies African Tour. It was played annually between 2003 and 2008, at various locations in South Africa.

The tournament boasted a considerable international field, with a contingent of Ladies European Tour players complimenting their season with joining the Ladies African Tour.

In 2005, future major winner Ashleigh Simon won the event while still an amateur. In 2007, Lee-Anne Pace captured her maiden professional title at the event.

== Winners ==
| Year | Winner | Score | Margin of victory | Runner(s)-up | Venue | Location | Purse (ZAR) | Note |
Pam Golding Lowveld International
| 2009 | Cancelled | | | | Nelspruit Golf Club | Nelspruit | 300,000 | (Note: Due to global economic pressure the Ladies African Tour was suspended for 2009.) |
| 2008 | (South Africa) Stacy Bregman | −7 (68-70-71=209) | 4 strokes | (Denmark) Lisa Holm Sørensen (South Africa) Morgana Robbertze | Nelspruit Golf Club | Nelspruit | 300,000 | |
Pam Golding Ladies International
| 2007 | (South Africa) Lee-Anne Pace | −11 (69-67-72=208) | 1 stroke | (Denmark) Julie Tvede | Dainfern Country Club | Johannesburg | 250,000 | |
| 2006 | (Switzerland) Nora Angehrn | −9 (70-68-72=210) | 2 strokes | (Germany) Bettina Hauert (England) Rebecca Hudson (Norway) Cecilie Lundgreen | Dainfern Country Club | Johannesburg | 300,000 | |
| 2005 | (South Africa) Ashleigh Simon (a) | E (73-76-67=216) | 1 stroke | (South Africa) Morgana Robbertze (South Africa) Gilly Tebbutt (a) | Mowbray Golf Club | Cape Town | 300,000 | |
| 2004 | (Finland) Minea Blomqvist | −3 (71-73-69=213) | 1 stroke | (South Africa) Ashleigh Simon (a) | Glendower Golf Club | Johannesburg | 250,000 | |
| 2003 | (South Africa) Laurette Maritz | −7 (209) | 3 strokes | (Germany) Elisabeth Esterl | Parkview Golf Club | Johannesburg | 200,000 | |
