= Sun International Ladies Challenge =

Golf tournament on the Sunshine Ladies Tour in South Africa

Tournament information
- Location: Sun City, South Africa
- Established: 2014
- Par: 72
- Tour: Sunshine Ladies Tour
- Format: Stroke play
- Prize fund: R 200,000
- Month played: February
- Final year: 2017

Tournament record score
- Aggregate: 206 Ashleigh Buhai
- To par: −10 as above

Final champion
- (South Africa) Ashleigh Buhai

Location map
- Location in South Africa Location in North West Province

The Sun International Ladies Challenge was a women's professional golf tournament held in Sun City, South Africa. It was an event on the Southern Africa-based Sunshine Ladies Tour between 2014 and 2017.

The tournament was held at the two courses within title sponsor Sun International's Sun City Resort, the Lost City Golf Course and Gary Player Country Club.

== Winners ==
Year	Venue	Winner	Score	Margin of victory	Runner(s)-up	Note
2017	Lost City Golf Course	(South Africa) Ashleigh Buhai	−10 (67-71-68=206)	5 strokes	(Norway) Cecilie Lundgreen	
2016	Gary Player Country Club	(South Africa) Bertine Strauss	−5 (74-67-70=211)	3 strokes	(Eswatini) Nobuhle Dlamini	
2015	Lost City Golf Course	(South Africa) Stacy Bregman	+1 (71-74=145)	1 stroke	(South Africa) Melissa Eaton	
2014	Lost City Golf Course	(South Africa) Tandi von Ruben	−1 (71-72=143)	Playoff	(South Africa) Magda Kruger (a)	
