= 2019 Sunshine Ladies Tour =

6th season of the Sunshine Ladies Tour

2019 Sunshine Ladies Tour season
- Duration: January 2019 – October 2019
- Number of official events: 12
- Most wins: 5: (Eswatini) Nobuhle Dlamini
- Order of Merit winner: (Eswatini) Nobuhle Dlamini

The 2019 Sunshine Ladies Tour was the 6th season of the Sunshine Ladies Tour, a series of professional golf tournaments for women based in South Africa.

== Schedule ==
The season consisted of 12 events, 11 in South Africa and one in Eswatini, played as a block between January and May, plus two Vodacom Origins of Golf Series events in October.

Date	Tournament	Venue	Winner	Purse (ZAR)	Notes
Jan 30	Canon Sunshine Ladies Tour Open	Irene Country Club	(South Africa) Ashleigh Buhai	200,000	
Feb 5	Serengeti Team Championship	Serengeti Estates	(France) Flora Peuch & M Duvernay	100,000	Team event
Feb 15	Dimension Data Ladies Pro-Am	George Golf Club (R1 & R2); Fancourt - Outeniqua (R3)	(Eswatini) Nobuhle Dlamini (Eswatini) N. Dlamini & F.Tremearne	500,000; 100,000	
Feb 21	South African Women's Masters	San Lameer Country Club	(South Africa) Leján Lewthwaite	250,000	
Feb 26	SuperSport Ladies Challenge	Wild Coast Sun Country Club	(Scotland) Jane Turner	400,000	
Mar 6	Cape Town Ladies Open	Royal Cape Golf Club	(South Korea) Carrie Park	200,000	
Mar 14	Investec South African Women's Open	Westlake Golf Club	(India) Diksha Dagar	2,000,000	Co-sanctioned with the LET
Mar 20	Jabra Ladies Classic	Glendower Golf Club	(France) Anne-Lise Caudal	200,000	
Mar 26	Joburg Ladies Open	Soweto Country Club	(Eswatini) Nobuhle Dlamini	500,000	
May 1	Investec Royal Swazi (Ladies)	(Eswatini) Royal Swazi Spa Country Club	(Eswatini) Nobuhle Dlamini	180,000	Limited field event (Note: Six SLT players compete alongside the men in this Sunshine Tour event for a separate purse.)
Oct 15	VOG Selborne Ladies Pro-Am	Selborne Park Golf Club	(Eswatini) Nobuhle Dlamini	58,850	
Oct 29	VOG Final Ladies Pro-Am	Simola Golf & Country Estate	(Eswatini) Nobuhle Dlamini	56,000	

== Order of Merit ==
This shows the leaders in the final Order of Merit.

Rank	Player	Points
1	(Eswatini) Nobuhle Dlamini	2,247
2	(South Africa) Tandi McCallum	1,115
3	(South Africa) Leján Lewthwaite	1,107
4	(South Africa) Kajal Mistry	1,028
5	(South Africa) Kim Williams	862
