= Monique Smit (golfer) =

South African professional golfer

Personal information
- Nationality: South Africa
- Born: 26 February 1991 (age 35) Nelspruit, South Africa
- Height: 5 ft 7 in (1.70 m)

Career
- Sport: Golf
- Turned professional: 2012
- Current tours: Ladies European Tour (joined 2012); Sunshine Ladies Tour (joined 2014)
- Professional wins: 4

Best results in LPGA major championships
- Chevron Championship: DNP
- Women's PGA C'ship: DNP
- U.S. Women's Open: DNP
- Women's British Open: CUT: 2020
- Evian Championship: DNP

Achievements and awards
- Sunshine Ladies Tour Order of Merit: 2020

Monique Smit (born 26 February 1991) is a South African professional golfer playing on the Ladies European Tour (LET). She was runner-up at the 2020 South African Women's Open and won the 2020 Sunshine Ladies Tour Order of Merit.

== Amateur career ==
Smit had a championship-winning amateur career including four titles on the 2005 Ernie Els Junior Tour and was a two-time Gus Ackermann Champion, in 2010 and 2011. She won the Western Province Stroke Play Championship in 2008 and 2011. She joined the National Team and represented South Africa internationally from the age of 15 including at the 2008 Espirito Santo Trophy and the 2008 All Africa Challenge Trophy, where she was the individual winner. She won titles on three different continents, having triumphed at the Jakarta World Junior Championship and Gosh Leinster Championship in Ireland.

== Professional career ==
Smit turned professional in 2012 and joined the LET. She secured her first professional win on the 2014 Sunshine Ladies Tour, at the Dimension Data Ladies Pro-Am, setting a new course record of 63 at Oubaai Golf Club. In 2014, she also won the SuperSport Ladies Challenge and was runner-up at the Zambia Ladies Open. In 2016, she won the Tshwane Ladies Open before an injury caused a four-year lay-off from tour.

Staging a comeback, Smit earned her full Ladies European Tour card for 2020 at qualifying school, winning a four-way playoff for the 20th and last card. On the 2020 Ladies European Tour, she was runner-up at the Investec South African Women's Open, one stroke behind Alice Hewson who won in her first start as a rookie member of the tour.

Smit won the 2020 Joburg Ladies Open and 2020 Sunshine Ladies Tour Order of Merit.

== Amateur wins ==
- 2005 Ernie Els Junior Tour
- 2007 KZN Junior Championship
- 2008 Western Province Stroke Play Championship, Jakarta World Junior Championship, All Africa Challenge Trophy (Individual)
- 2010 Gus Ackermann Championship, Gosh Leinster Championship
- 2011 Gus Ackermann Championship, Guateng Matchplay Championship, Western Province Stroke Play Championship

== Professional wins (4) ==
=== Sunshine Ladies Tour wins (4) ===
No.	Date	Tournament	Winning score	To par	Margin of victory	Runner-up
1	23 Feb 2014	Dimension Data Ladies Challenge	63-72=135	−9	2 strokes	(South Africa) Ashleigh Simon
2	7 Mar 2014	SuperSport Ladies Challenge	139	−5	1 stroke	(South Africa) Lee-Anne Pace
3	4 Feb 2016	Ladies Tshwane Open	69-67-68=204	−9	Playoff	(South Africa) Ashleigh Buhai
4	26 Feb 2020	Joburg Ladies Open	71-76-70=217	+1	2 strokes	(Czech Republic) Sideri Vanova

== Results in LPGA majors ==
Tournament	2020
ANA Inspiration	
U.S. Women's Open	
Women's PGA Championship	
The Evian Championship	NT
Women's British Open	CUT

Did not play

CUT = missed the half-way cut
NT = no tournament

== Team appearances ==
Amateur

- Espirito Santo Trophy (representing South Africa): 2008
- All Africa Challenge Trophy (representing South Africa): 2008 (winners)
