= 2018 Sunshine Ladies Tour =

5th season of the Sunshine Ladies Tour

2018 Sunshine Ladies Tour season
- Duration: January 2018 – May 2018
- Number of official events: 8
- Most wins: 2 (tie): (South Africa) Ashleigh Buhai (Eswatini) Nobuhle Dlamini
- Order of Merit winner: (South Africa) Stacy Bregman

The 2018 Sunshine Ladies Tour was the 5th season of the Sunshine Ladies Tour, a series of professional golf tournaments for women based in South Africa.

The season offered a purse of R4,450,000, plus a 100,000 incentive for the Investec Property Fund Order of Merit winner.

== Schedule ==
The season consisted of 8 events, 7 in South Africa and one in Eswatini, played as a block between January and March, with one event in May.

Date	Tournament	Venue	Winner	Purse (ZAR)	Notes
Jan 23	Canon Ladies Tshwane Open	Pretoria Country Club	(South Africa) Stacy Bregman	400,000	
Jan 31	Joburg Ladies Open	Modderfontein Golf Club	(South Africa) Ashleigh Buhai	500,000	
Feb 6	Cape Town Ladies Open	Royal Cape Golf Club	(South Africa) Lee-Anne Pace	200,000	
Feb 16	Dimension Data Ladies Challenge	George Golf Club (R1 & R2); Fancourt - Outeniqua (R3)	(South Korea) Carrie Park (South Korea) D Park & L del Balzo (a)	500,000; 100,000	
Feb 22	South African Women's Masters	San Lameer Country Club	(Germany) Laura Fuenfstueck	350,000	
Feb 28	SuperSport Ladies Challenge	Wild Coast Sun Country Club	(Eswatini) Nobuhle Dlamini	400,000	
Mar 8	Investec South African Women's Open	Westlake Golf Club	(South Africa) Ashleigh Buhai	2,000,000	Co-sanctioned with the LET
May 9	Investec Royal Swazi (Ladies)	(Eswatini) Royal Swazi Spa Country Club	(Eswatini) Nobuhle Dlamini	150,000	Limited field event (Note: Six SLT players compete alongside the men in this Sunshine Tour event for a separate purse.)

== Order of Merit ==
This shows the final Investec Property Fund Order of Merit, which featured a R100,000 bonus. The leader received a wild card for an event on the Ladies European Tour and Final Stage exemption into the 2019 LET Q-School.

Rank	Player	Points
1	(South Africa) Stacy Bregman	3,610
2	(South Africa) Ashleigh Buhai	3,480
3	(Namibia) Bonita Bredenhann	2,129
4	(South Africa) Nicole Garcia	1,447
5	(Eswatini) Nobuhle Dlamini	1,342
