= ABSA Ladies Invitational =

Golf tournament on the Sunshine Ladies Tour in South Africa

Tournament information
- Location: Johannesburg, South Africa
- Established: 2023
- Course: Royal Johannesburg & Kensington Golf Club
- Par: 72
- Tour: Sunshine Ladies Tour
- Format: Stroke play
- Prize fund: R 1,500,000
- Month played: March

Tournament record score
- Aggregate: 199
- To par: -17

Current champion
- (South Africa) Nadia van der Westhuizen

Location map
- Location in South Africa Location in Gauteng

The ABSA Ladies Invitational is a women's professional golf tournament held in Johannesburg, South Africa. It has been an event on the Southern Africa-based Sunshine Ladies Tour since 2023.

== History ==
Standard Bank was title sponsor of the inaugural tournament, before shifting its sponsorship to the Cape Town Ladies Open. In 2024 Absa Group became title sponsor instead, and the event was held at Serengeti Golf and Wildlife Estate in Kempton Park, and won by Casandra Alexander four strokes ahead of Harang Lee. The title sponsor, Absa Group, was formerly known as the Amalgamated Banks of South Africa.

In 2025, the tournament moved back to Royal Johannesburg & Kensington Golf Club. Thalia Martin of England secured her maiden professional victory at the event, as Madelene Stavnar from Norway double-bogeyed the 18th hole to finish on nine under par tied for second with Scotland's Laura Beveridge and France's Anne-Charlotte Mora, who shot a final round 63.

== Winners ==
Year	Winner	Score	Margin of victory	Runner(s)-up	Venue
ABSA Ladies Invitational
2026	(South Africa) Nadia van der Westhuizen	−17 (65-68-66=199)	7 strokes	(South Africa) Jordan Rothman	Royal Johannesburg
2025	(England) Thalia Martin	−11 (69-65-71=205)	2 strokes	(Scotland) Laura Beveridge (France) Anne-Charlotte Mora (Norway) Madelene Stavnar	Royal Johannesburg
2024	(South Africa) Casandra Alexander	−12 (68-70-66=204)	4 strokes	(Spain) Harang Lee	Serengeti Golf and Wildlife
Standard Bank Ladies Open
2023	(South Africa) Stacy Bregman	−5 (71-68-72=211)	Playoff	(South Africa) Lee-Anne Pace	Royal Johannesburg
