= SuperSport Ladies Challenge =

Golf tournament on the Sunshine Ladies Tour in South Africa

Tournament information
- Location: Sun City, South Africa
- Established: 2014
- Course: Gary Player Country Club
- Par: 72
- Tour: Sunshine Ladies Tour
- Format: Stroke play
- Prize fund: R 1,300,000
- Month played: February/March

Tournament record score
- Aggregate: 202 Bertine Strauss (2016)
- To par: −14 as above

Current champion
- (Germany) Celina Sattelkau

Location map
- Location in South Africa Location in North West Province

The SuperSport Ladies Challenge is a women's professional golf tournament held in South Africa. It is an event on the Southern Africa-based Sunshine Ladies Tour since 2014 and has been played at the Gary Player Country Club in Sun City since 2020.

In 2022, Paula Reto secured her first professional title in her home country after a record ten stroke victory.

== Winners ==
Year	Venue	Winner	Score	Margin of victory	Runner(s)-up	Note
2026	Humewood Golf Club	(Germany) Celina Sattelkau	−3 (69-75-69=213)	Playoff	(South Africa) Casandra Alexander	
2025	Gary Player Country Club	(South Africa) Nadia van der Westhuizen	−3 (71-68-74=213)	1 stroke	(South Africa) Kaiyuree Moodley	
2024	Lost City Golf Club	(India) Tvesa Malik	−9 (71-65-71=207)	3 strokes	(South Africa) Gabrielle Venter	
2023	Gary Player Country Club	(South Africa) Casandra Alexander	−9 (70-67-70=207)	6 strokes	(Norway) Dorthea Forbrigd	
2022	Gary Player Country Club	(South Africa) Paula Reto	−13 (67-65-71=213)	10 strokes	(South Africa) Casandra Alexander	
2021	Gary Player Country Club	(South Africa) Michaela Fletcher	−5 (75-65-71=211)	1 stroke	(South Africa) Caitlyn Macnab (a)	
2020	Gary Player Country Club	(South Africa) Leján Lewthwaite	−6 (66-71-73=210)	Playoff	(South Africa) Tandi McCallum	
2019	Wild Coast Sun Country Club	(Scotland) Jane Turner	−4 (69-69-68= 206)	4 strokes	(Eswatini) Nobuhle Dlamini	
2018	Wild Coast Sun Country Club	(Eswatini) Nobuhle Dlamini	−5 (64-69-72=205)	1 stroke	(South Africa) Lora Assad	
2017	Huddle Park Golf Club	(South Africa) Kim Williams	−7 (70-70-69=209)	1 stroke	(South Africa) Melissa Eaton	
2016	Huddle Park Golf Club	(South Africa) Bertine Strauss	−14 (64-69-69=202)	5 strokes	(Spain) Maria Beautell	
2015	Zwartkop Country Club	(South Africa) Lee-Anne Pace	−5 (137)	1 stroke	(Eswatini) Nobuhle Dlamini (South Africa) Ashleigh Simon (South Africa) Kim Williams	
2014	Observatory Golf Club	(South Africa) Monique Smit	−5 (139)	1 stroke	(South Africa) Lee-Anne Pace	
