= Laura Fünfstück =

German professional golfer (born 1994)

Personal information
- Nationality: Germany
- Born: 21 December 1994 (age 31) Langen, Hesse, Germany
- Height: 5 ft 6 in (1.68 m)

Career
- Sport: Golf
- College: College of Charleston
- Turned professional: 2018
- Current tour: Ladies European Tour (joined 2018)
- Professional wins: 5

Number of wins by tour
- Ladies European Tour: 1
- WPGA Tour of Australasia: 1
- Other: 3

Best results in LPGA major championships
- Chevron Championship: DNP
- Women's PGA C'ship: DNP
- U.S. Women's Open: DNP
- Women's British Open: T45: 2020
- Evian Championship: DNP

Laura Fünfstück (born 21 December 1994) is a German professional golfer who plays on the Ladies European Tour. She won the 2018 South African Women's Masters and was runner-up at the 2023 La Sella Open in Spain, before winning the 2025 PIF London Championship.

== Amateur career ==
Fünfstück started playing golf at the age of three when her parents bought her first set of plastic clubs. She won the 2013 French International Lady Juniors Amateur Championship (Internationaux de France – Trophee Esmond) and finished her amateur career with a win at the German National Amateur in 2017. Fünfstück was part of the German National Team, representing her country four times in the European Ladies' Team Championship and the 2014 Espirito Santo Trophy, the World Team Championship. She represented Europe at the Patsy Hankins Trophy in 2016.

Before turning pro in January 2018, Fünfstück played college golf and studied finance at the College of Charleston from 2013 to 2017. Three out of her four years, she was named Player of the Year in the Colonial Athletic Association conference, finishing top-25 in the 2017 NCAA Championship. She was the first College of Charleston female golfer to advance to Nationals and with five wins holds the school record for most college tournament wins. Fünfstück won the Kiawah Island Classic, the largest collegiate tournament in the country with a field of 232 players.

== Professional career ==
In 2018, her rookie year as a professional, she won the South African Women's Masters. She joined the Ladies European Tour, where she made five starts and recorded a best finish of T8 in the Lalla Meryem Cup. In 2019, she played in 19 tournaments, posted six top-10 finishes, and ended the season in ninth place on the Order of Merit.

In 2020, Fünfstück ended the season in tenth place on the Race to Costa del Sol. She narrowly missed out on the playoff by a stroke at the Omega Dubai Moonlight Classic, ending T3 behind Minjee Lee and Céline Boutier. In 2021, she played in 10 LET events where her best finish of T7 at the Big Green Egg Open in the Netherlands. Hit with back pain, she took a one-year hiatus from tour in mid-2021 to focus on getting back to full health. After overcoming a back injury that impacted her performance in 2022 and the following years, Fünfstück started the 2025 season with a strong 6th place finish at the South African Women's Open. She also supports the "Kinderhilfestiftung Frankfurt" (Children's Aid Foundation Frankfurt), donating a fixed amount for every birdie and eagle she scores during the season.

== Personal life ==
Fünfstück resides in London, England, with her wife Rosie Davis, who is also a professional golfer on the Ladies European Tour. Despite living in the UK, she maintains close ties to her home region of Frankfurt, visiting her family and her home golf club, GC Neuhof in Dreieich, several times a year.

== Amateur wins ==
- 2013 French International Lady Juniors Amateur Championship (Internationaux de France – Trophee Esmond)
- 2016 CSU Fall Invitational
- 2017 German National Amateur, Kiawah Island Intercollegiate

== Professional wins (5) ==
=== Ladies European Tour wins (1) ===
No.	Date	Tournament	Winning score	To par	Margin of victory	Runner-up
1	10 Aug 2025	PIF London Championship	67-70-72=209	−10	1 stroke	(Ecuador) Daniela Darquea

LET playoff record (0–1)

No.	Year	Tournament	Opponent	Result
1	2023	La Sella Open	(Spain) Nuria Iturrioz	Lost to par on second extra hole

=== Ladies Sunshine Tour (1) ===
No.	Date	Tournament	Winning score	To par	Margin of victory	Runners-up
1	22 Feb 2018	South African Women's Masters	70-69-76=215	−1	1 stroke	(Eswatini) Nobuhle Dlamini (South Africa) Leján Lewthwaite (Scotland) Shannon McWilliam

=== ALPG Tour (1) ===
- 2020 Windaroo Lakes ALPG Pro-Am

=== Other wins (2) ===
- 2026 Rose Ladies Series – West Lancs, Rose Ladies Series – North Hants

== Results in LPGA majors ==
Tournament	2024	2025
Chevron Championship		
U.S. Women's Open		
Women's PGA Championship		
The Evian Championship		
Women's British Open	T45	T67

Did not play

T = tied

== Team appearances ==
Amateur

- European Ladies' Team Championship (representing Germany): 2013, 2014, 2015, 2016, 2017
- Espirito Santo Trophy (representing Germany): 2014
- Patsy Hankins Trophy (representing Europe): 2016
