= South African Women's Masters =

Tournament information
- Location: South Africa
- Established: 1996
- Course: San Lameer Country Club
- Organized by: Women's PGA of South Africa
- Tours: Sunshine Ladies Tour; Ladies European Tour (2001)
- Format: Stroke play
- Prize fund: £100,000 (2001)
- Month played: February

Current champion
- (Scotland) Jane Turner

The South African Women's Masters is a golf tournament in South Africa.

First played in 1996 it is the second oldest professional women's golf tournament in South Africa, after the South African Women's Open founded in 1988. The inaugural event was won by South Africa's Sally Little, a two-time LPGA major winner.

The tournament was included on the Ladies European Tour in 2001 and played at Gary Player Country Club in Sun City. It is sanctioned by the WPGA and supported by Women's Golf South Africa (the governing body for amateur golf), and is played as part of the Sunshine Ladies Tour.

== Winners ==
Year	Tour(s) (Note: SLT − Sunshine Ladies Tour; LET − Ladies European Tour; LAT − Ladies African Tour; NED − Nedbank Women's Golf Tour.)	Winner	Country	Score
South African Women's Masters
2020	SLT	Jane Turner	Scotland	215 (−1)
2019	SLT	Leján Lewthwaite	South Africa	215 (−1)
2018	SLT	Laura Fuenfstueck	Germany	215 (−1)
2017	SLT	Carrie Park	South Korea	209 (−7)
2009–16: No tournament
WPGA Masters
2008	LAT	Rebecca Hudson	England	204 (–12)
2007	LAT	Kaisa Ruuttila	Finland	209 (–7)
Nedbank Women's Masters
2006	NED	Ashleigh Simon (a)	South Africa	209 (−7)
2005	NED	Maria Beautell	Spain	212 (–4)
Nedbank Women's SA Masters
2004	NED	Helena Alterby	Sweden	204 (–12)
2003	NED	Laurette Maritz (2)	South Africa	
2002	NED	Mandy Adamson	South Africa	
Nedbank Mastercard South African Masters
2001	NED · LET	Samantha Head	England	210 (−6)
South African Ladies Masters
2000	NED	Mandy Adamson	South Africa	
1999: No tournament
1998		Laurette Maritz	South Africa	
1997		Barbara Pestana	South Africa	
Ladies South African Masters
1996		Sally Little	South Africa	

== See also ==
- South African Women's Open
