= Hayley Davis =

English professional golfer

Personal information
- Full name: Hayley Jane Davis
- Nationality: England
- Born: 4 February 1993 (age 33) Poole, England
- Height: 5 ft 5 in (1.65 m)

Career
- Sport: Golf
- College: Baylor University
- Turned professional: 2015
- Current tour: Ladies European Tour (joined 2020)
- Former tours: LET Access Series (joined 2018); Symetra Tour (joined 2016)
- Professional wins: 4

Best results in LPGA major championships
- Chevron Championship: DNP
- Women's PGA C'ship: DNP
- U.S. Women's Open: CUT: 2019
- Women's British Open: CUT: 2022, 2023
- Evian Championship: DNP

Achievements and awards
- LET Access Series Order of Merit: 2019

Hayley Davis (born 4 February 1993) is an English professional golfer who plays on the Ladies European Tour. She was part of the winning team at the 2021 Aramco Team Series – Sotogrande and won the 2023 Cape Town Ladies Open. She was also runner-up at the 2019 Tipsport Czech Ladies Open.

== Early life and amateur career ==
Davis was born in Poole, Dorset and attended Brockenhurst College in Hampshire and Baylor University in Texas.

She is attached to Ferndown Golf Club and won the Abu Dhabi Junior Golf Championship and English Women's Amateur Championship in 2010, and the English Women's Open Amateur Stroke Play Championship in 2014.

Davis represented Great Britain and Ireland at the Vagliano Trophy and the Astor Trophy, and England at the Girls Home Internationals, Women's Home Internationals and the European Ladies' Team Championship, where her team finished fourth in 2013, 2014 and again in 2015. She also played in the 2014 Espirito Santo Trophy together with Gabriella Cowley and Bronte Law.

== Professional career ==
Davis turned professional in 2015 and played on the Symetra Tour in 2016, but only made 4 cuts in 16 starts. She started competed competing on the LET Access Series in 2018 and recorded five top-10 finishes in her rookie season, including a best finish of sixth at the Viaplay Ladies Finnish Open.

Ahead of the 2019 season, Davis started working with a new coach, and credits Peter Thompson at Parley Golf Club for an improvement in her performance.

In 2019, she earned her first professional win at the Bossey Ladies Championship, 7 strokes ahead of Emma Grechi. She secured eight further top-10 finishes, including runner-up finishes at the Terre Blanche Ladies Open where she broke the course record but lost out in a playoff to Austria's Sarah Schober, and the Tipsport Czech Ladies Open, a co-sanctioned event between the Ladies European Tour (LET) and the LET Access Series. She claimed the 2019 LET Access Series Order of Merit title to earn a full LET card for 2020.

In 2021, Davis played 16 LET events and was part of the winning team at the Aramco Team Series – Sotogrande alongside Ashleigh Buhai and Stacy Lee Bregman, and the runner-up team at the Aramco Team Series – New York alongside Sophia Popov and Magdalena Simmermacher.

In 2022, Davis held a two-shot lead going into the final round of the Aramco Team Series – London after carding a round of 68 (−5) to be nine-under-par. However, a final day 80 saw her finish seven strokes behind her compatriot Bronte Law who claimed the title at nine under.

In 2023, Davis won the Cape Town Ladies Open on the Sunshine Ladies Tour in brutally windy conditions at the Atlantic Beach Links & Golf Club.

== Amateur wins ==
- 2010 English Women's Amateur Championship, Abu Dhabi Junior Golf Championship
- 2011 English Girls Close, Abu Dhabi Junior
- 2013 Allstate Sugar Bowl Intercollegiate
- 2014 English Women's Open Amateur Stroke Play Championship, Betsy Rawls Longhorn Invite
- 2015 NCAA San Antonio Regional

== Professional wins (4) ==
=== Sunshine Ladies Tour wins (1) ===
No.	Date	Tournament	Winning score	To par	Margin of victory	Runner-up
1	17 Feb 2023	Cape Town Ladies Open	77-78-73=228	+12	3 strokes	(South Africa) Kiera Floyd

=== LET Access Series wins (1) ===
No.	Date	Tournament	Winning score	To par	Margin of victory	Runner-up
1	16 Aug 2019	Bossey Ladies Championship	65-65-70=200	−13	7 strokes	(France) Emma Grechi

LET Access Series playoff record (0–1)

No.	Year	Tournament	Opponent	Result
1	2019	Terre Blanche Ladies Open	(Austria) Sarah Schober	Schober won with par on first extra hole

=== Other wins (2) ===
- 2022 Rose Ladies Series at Brockenhurst Manor, Rose Ladies Series at Bearwood Lakes

== Team appearances ==
Amateur

- Girls Home Internationals (representing England): 2010 (winners), 2011
- Women's Home Internationals (representing England): 2010
- European Girls' Team Championship (representing England): 2010
- European Ladies' Team Championship (representing England): 2011, 2013, 2014, 2015
- Vagliano Trophy (representing Great Britain and Ireland): 2013, 2015
- Espirito Santo Trophy (representing England): 2014
- Astor Trophy (representing Great Britain and Ireland): 2015
