= Esme Hamilton =

English professional golfer (born 1999)

Personal information
- Nationality: England
- Born: 1999 (age 26–27) Nottingham, England

Career
- Sport: Golf
- College: University of Tennessee at Chattanooga; University of Kansas
- Turned professional: 2024
- Current tour: Ladies European Tour (joined 2025)
- Former tour: LET Access Series (joined 2024)
- Professional wins: 1

Number of wins by tour
- Ladies European Tour: 1

Best results in LPGA major championships
- Chevron Championship: DNP
- Women's PGA C'ship: DNP
- U.S. Women's Open: DNP
- Women's British Open: CUT: 2026
- Evian Championship: CUT: 2026

Esme Hamilton (born 1999) is an English professional golfer and Ladies European Tour player. She was runner-up at the 2025 Czech Ladies Open.

== Early life and amateur career ==
Hamilton was born in Nottingham and educated at Loughborough High School. She attended the University of Tennessee at Chattanooga and played with the Chattanooga Mocs women's golf team between 2018 and 2022, where she was a 4-time WGCA All-American Scholar and recorded three individual runner-up finishes at the Chattanooga Classic, Mercedes-Benz Intercollegiate and Jackrabbit Invitational. She then spent a year as graduate student at the University of Kansas and played with the Kansas Jayhawks women's golf team between 2022 and 2023.

Hamilton made it to the matchplay stage of The Women's Amateur Championship in 2022.

== Professional career ==
Hamilton turned professional in 2024 and joined the LET Access Series, where her best finish was a tie for 6th at the Calatayud Ladies Open.

In 2025, after earning status at Q-School, she joined the Ladies European Tour where she finished runner-up at the Czech Ladies Open, two strokes behind Casandra Alexander, in her sixth start. At the Ladies Swiss Open, she shot an opening round 64 to hold the outright lead one stroke ahead of home player Kim Métraux, and ultimately ended the tournament tied sixth.

== Professional wins (1) ==
=== Ladies European Tour wins (1) ===
| No. | Date | Tournament | Winning score | To par | Margin of victory | Runners-up |
|---|---|---|---|---|---|---|
| 1 | 26 Apr 2026 | Investec South African Women's Open^{[1]} | 66-70-70-71=277 | −15 | 2 strokes | (England) Cara Gainer |

^{1} Co-sanctioned by the Sunshine Ladies Tour.

== Results in LPGA majors ==
| Tournament | 2026 |
|---|---|
| Chevron Championship | |
| U.S. Women's Open | |
| Women's PGA Championship | |
| The Evian Championship | CUT |
| Women's British Open | CUT |

Did not play

CUT = missed the half-way cut
