= Anne-Lise Caudal =

French golfer

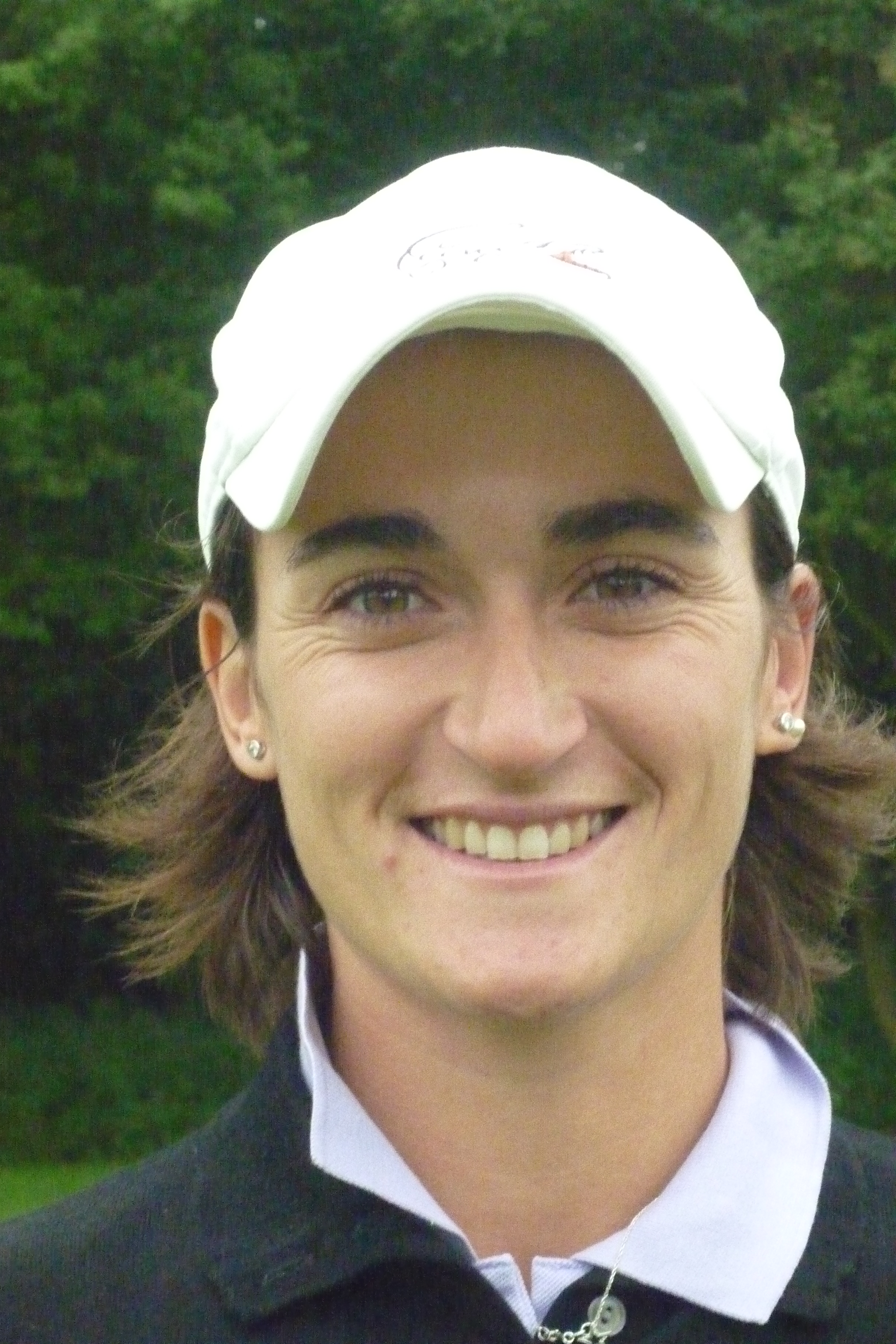

Personal information
- Nationality: France
- Born: 26 June 1984 (age 42) Saint-Jean-de-Luz, France
- Height: 170 cm (5 ft 7 in)
- Spouse: Lee-Anne Pace

Career
- Sport: Golf
- Turned professional: 2006
- Current tours: Ladies European Tour; Sunshine Ladies Tour
- Professional wins: 4

Number of wins by tour
- Ladies European Tour: 2
- Other: 2

Best results in LPGA major championships
- Chevron Championship: DNP
- Women's PGA C'ship: DNP
- U.S. Women's Open: DNP
- Women's British Open: T31: 2010
Medal record
Mediterranean Games
Silver medal – second place	2005 Almería	Women's team
Bronze medal – third place	2005 Almería	Individual

Anne-Lise Caudal (born 26 June 1984) is a French professional golfer with two victories on the Ladies European Tour.

== Amateur career ==
Caudal enjoyed a successful amateur career and in 2004 won the Biarritz Cup and the Championnat de France Dames (Coupe Gaveau). In 2005, she won the French Ladies Amateur at Pau Golf Club and topped the French national order of merit. She finished runner-up at the 2006 Portuguese Ladies Amateur.

Caudal represented France in the 2004 European Lady Junior's Team Championship and the 2005 European Ladies' Team Championship, where she finished 3rd with Cassandra Kirkland and Jade Schaeffer. She played twice at the Espirito Santo Trophy, and finished 4th in 2006 with Isabelle Boineau and Mélodie Bourdy. In 2005, she played in the Vagliano Trophy against Great Britain & Ireland at Golf de Chantilly.

== Professional career ==
Caudal turned professional in 2006 and joined the Ladies European Tour. In 2008, she won the Ladies Open of Portugal, and the following week lost a playoff to Rebecca Hudson at the Tenerife Ladies Open.

She finished runner-up at the 2009 European Nations Cup, representing France together with Gwladys Nocera. An opening round of 69 at the 2010 Women's British Open had her tied for third spot, one stroke behind Katherine Hull and tournament winner Yani Tseng, before finishing tied 31st, her best result at a major.

In 2012, she won the Ladies German Open, where she defeated Laura Davies in a playoff. At the 2016 season finale, the Dubai Ladies Masters, her caddie died of a heart attack on the 13th fairway in the first round. Play was halted for the day, but she went on to make the cut.

In 2019 she won the Jabra Ladies Classic on the Sunshine Ladies Tour. She was runner-up at the 2023 Dimension Data Ladies Pro-Am behind Moa Folke.

== Personal life ==
In January 2024, Caudal married fellow LET player Lee-Anne Pace at a ceremony held in Yzerfontein, South Africa. The two became acquainted when Pace first started competing on the LET in 2008. In 2018, she lost a playoff to Pace at the Cape Town Ladies Open.

== Amateur wins ==
- 2004 Biarritz Cup, Championnat de France Dames (Coupe Gaveau)
- 2005 French International Ladies Amateur Championship

== Professional wins (4) ==
=== Ladies European Tour wins (2) ===
No.	Date	Tournament	Winning score	Margin of victory	Runner-up
1	15 Jun 2008	Ladies Open of Portugal	−16 (64-69-70=203)	1 stroke	(France) Gwladys Nocera (England) Georgina Simpson
2	27 May 2012	Ladies German Open	−13 (74-67-67-67=275)	Playoff	(England) Laura Davies

Ladies European Tour playoff record (1–1)

No.	Year	Tournament	Opponent	Result
1	2008	Tenerife Ladies Open	(England) Rebecca Hudson	Lost to birdie on third extra hole
2	2012	Ladies German Open	(England) Laura Davies	Won with birdie on second extra hole

=== Sunshine Ladies Tour wins (1) ===
No.	Date	Tournament	Winning score	Margin of victory	Runner-up
1	22 Mar 2019	Jabra Ladies Classic	−4 (71-68-73=212)	2 strokes	(Eswatini) Nobuhle Dlamini

Sunshine Ladies Tour playoff record (0–1)

No.	Year	Tournament	Opponent	Result
1	2018	Cape Town Ladies Open	(South Africa) Lee-Anne Pace	Lost to par on first extra hole

=== LET Access Series wins (1) ===
No.	Date	Tournament	Winning score	Margin of victory	Runner-up
1	15 Apr 2011	La Nivelle Ladies Open	−6 (66-67-71=204)	4 strokes	(France) Julie Maisongrosse

== Results in LPGA majors ==
Tournament	2008	2009	2010	2011
Women's British Open	CUT	T60	T31	CUT

CUT = missed the half-way cut
T = tied

== Team appearances ==
Amateur

- European Lady Junior's Team Championship (representing France): 2004
- Espirito Santo Trophy (representing France): 2004, 2006
- European Ladies' Team Championship (representing France): 2005
- Vagliano Trophy (representing the Continent of Europe): 2005

Professional

- European Nations Cup (representing France): 2009
