= 2015 Sunshine Ladies Tour =

2nd season of the Sunshine Ladies Tour

2015 Sunshine Ladies Tour season
- Duration: October 2014 – March 2015
- Number of official events: 9
- Most wins: 4: (South Africa) Lee-Anne Pace
- Order of Merit winner: (South Africa) Lee-Anne Pace

The 2015 Sunshine Ladies Tour was the 2nd season of the Sunshine Ladies Tour, a series of professional golf tournaments for women based in South Africa.

== Schedule ==
The season consisted of 9 events, all held in South Africa, played between October 2014 and March 2015.

Date	Tournament	Venue	Winner	Purse (ZAR)	Notes
Oct 19	Cell C South African Women's Open	San Lameer Country Club	(South Africa) Lee-Anne Pace	€320,000	Co-sanctioned with the LET
Feb 10	Sun International Ladies Challenge	Lost City Golf Course	(South Africa) Stacy Bregman	100,000	
Feb 13	Chase to Investec Cup Glendower	Glendower Golf Club	(South Africa) Nicole Garcia	100,000	
Feb 22	Dimension Data Ladies Pro-Am	Oubaai Golf Resort & Spa	(South Africa) Stacy Bregman	200,000	
Feb 26	Cape Town Ladies Open	Royal Cape Golf Club	(South Africa) Stacy Bregman	100,000	
Mar 3	Sunshine Ladies Tour Open	Royal Johannesburg & Kensington Golf Club	(South Africa) Ashleigh Simon	100,000	
Mar 11	SuperSport Ladies Challenge	Zwartkop Country Club	(South Africa) Lee-Anne Pace	100,000	
Mar 17	Ladies Tshwane Open	Pretoria Country Club	(South Africa) Lee-Anne Pace	100,000	
Mar 22	Investec Ladies Cup	Millvale Private Retreat	(South Africa) Lee-Anne Pace	100,000	

== Order of Merit ==
This shows the leaders in the final Order of Merit, the Chase to the Investec Ladies Cup. The winner was awarded R250,000 from a R600,000 bonus pool.

Rank	Player	Points
1	(South Africa) Lee-Anne Pace	1,900
2	(South Africa) Melissa Eaton	1,471
3	(South Africa) Stacy Bregman	1,383
4	(South Africa) Bonita Bredenhann	1,338
5	(South Africa) Nicole Garcia	1,288
