= MCB Ladies Classic – Mauritius =

Golf tournament on the Ladies European Tour in Mauritius

Tournament information
- Location: Flacq, Mauritius
- Established: 2026
- Course: Constance Belle Mare Plage (Legend Course)
- Par: 72
- Length: 6,018 yards (5,503 m)
- Tours: Ladies European Tour; Sunshine Ladies Tour
- Format: Stroke play
- Prize fund: €400,000
- Month played: May

Current champion
- (Denmark) Smilla Tarning Sønderby

Final champion
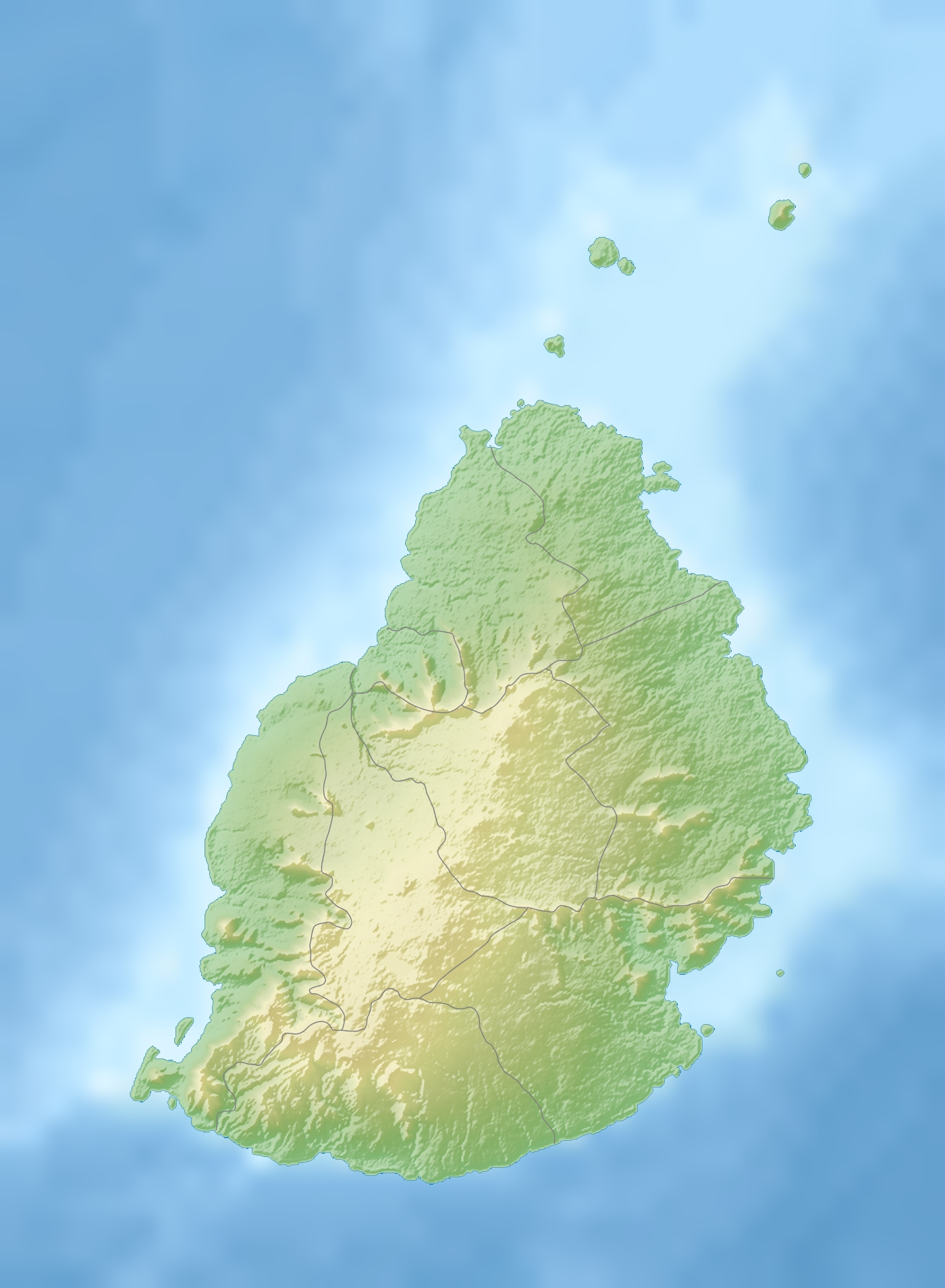
- Location in Mauritius Location in Indian Ocean

The MCB Ladies Classic – Mauritius is a women's professional golf tournament held in Mauritius. It is an event on both the Ladies European Tour and the South Africa-based Sunshine Ladies Tour.

== History ==
The inaugural event was announced in 2025 and scheduled for May 2026. It will feature a field of 120 players and the purse was set to €400,000.

The tournament marks the first time the Ladies European Tour has visited Mauritius. The venue has hosted the season finale of the European Senior Tour for over a decade.

== Winners ==
Year	Tours (Note: LET − Ladies European Tour; SLT − Sunshine Ladies Tour.)	Winner	Score	Margin of victory	Runners-up
2026	LET · SLT	(Denmark) Smilla Tarning Sønderby	−14 (66-69-67=202)	1 stroke	(South Africa) Casandra Alexander (Sweden) Kajsa Arwefjäll

== See also ==
- MCB Tour Championship
