= Danielle du Toit =

South African professional golfer (born 1999)

Personal information
- Nationality: South Africa
- Born: 10 February 1999 (age 27) Pretoria, South Africa
- Height: 170 cm (5 ft 7 in)

Career
- Sport: Golf
- College: Purdue University
- Turned professional: 2023
- Current tours: Ladies European Tour (joined 2024); Sunshine Ladies Tour (joined 2024)
- Professional wins: 2

Danielle du Toit (born 10 February 1999) is a South African professional golfer who plays on the Ladies European Tour (LET). In 2025, she captained the winning team at the PIF London Championship and won the NTT Data Ladies Pro-Am on the Sunshine Ladies Tour.

== Career ==
Du Toit hails from Pretoria and honed her game at Pretoria Country Club from age nine, before winning the South African Girls Championship, All India Ladies Amateur and the WGSA 72 Hole Individual Championship.

She attended Purdue University between 2018 and 2023, and played with the Purdue Boilermakers women's golf team while majoring in Industrial Management.

Du Toit turned professional after graduating in 2023, and earned her LET card for the 2024 season at Q-School. She also joined the Sunshine Ladies Tour, where she won the 2025 NTT Data Ladies Pro-Am in a playoff with Lee-Anne Pace, and finished 4th in the Order of Merit.

She captained the winning team composed of Sarah Kemp, Marta Sanz Barrio and Megan Dennis at the 2025 PIF London Championship.

== Amateur wins ==
- 2016 Grand Prix World Amateur Audi Reunion, South African Girls Championship, Gauteng North Championship, Southern Cape Amateur Open & Closed Championship
- 2017 North West Championship, Gauteng Junior & 36 Hole Championship, All India Ladies Amateur
- 2018 Western Province Women's Amateur Championship, WGSA 72 Hole Individual Championship
- 2023 Ekurhuleni Open, Junior Mid-Am & Senior Championship

== Professional wins (2) ==
=== Sunshine Ladies Tour wins (2) ===
| No. | Date | Tournament | Winning score | Margin of victory | Runner-up |
|---|---|---|---|---|---|
| 1 | 16 Feb 2025 | NTT Data Ladies Pro-Am | −10 (69-70-67=206) | Playoff | (South Africa) Lee-Anne Pace |
| 2 | 7 Mar 2026 | Standard Bank Ladies Open | −4 (71-69-72=212) | 1 stroke | (Northern Ireland) Olivia Mehaffey (Netherlands) Romy Meekers |

Sunshine Ladies Tour playoff record (1–0)

| No. | Year | Tournament | Opponent | Result |
|---|---|---|---|---|
| 1 | 2025 | NTT Data Ladies Pro-Am | (South Africa) Lee-Anne Pace | Won with birdie on first extra hole |

== Team appearances ==
Amateur

- Junior Golf World Cup (representing South Africa): 2016
