= Mandy Adamson =

South African professional golfer (1972–2022)

Personal information
- Nationality: South Africa
- Born: 9 March 1972 Johannesburg, Gauteng, South Africa
- Died: 26 July 2022 (aged 50)

Career
- Sport: Golf
- Turned professional: 1994
- Former tours: Ladies European Tour; Nedbank Women's Golf Tour
- Professional wins: 7

Best results in LPGA major championships
- Chevron Championship: DNP
- Women's PGA C'ship: DNP
- U.S. Women's Open: DNP
- du Maurier Classic: DNP
- Women's British Open: CUT: 2003
- Evian Championship: DNP

Achievements and awards
- Nedbank Women's Golf Tour Order of Merit: 2002

Mandy Adamson (9 March 1972 – 26 July 2022) was a South African professional golfer and Ladies European Tour player. She became the first to win the South African Women's Open three times.

== Career ==
Adamson enjoyed a successful career as one of South Africa's leading female golfers. She won multiple titles as an amateur, including becoming South African Amateur champion three times. She was a semi-finalist at the British Ladies Amateur in 1994 and represented South Africa in the Espirito Santo Trophy twice.

Adamson turned professional in 1994 and joined the Ladies European Tour where she played until 2004. She played in the 2003 Women's British Open at Royal Lytham & St Annes Golf Club where she missed the cut by one stroke after rounds of 75 and 73. She also played in South Africa where she won three South African Women's Open and two South African Women's Masters, and topped the Order of Merit in 2002.

== Death ==
Adamson died from cancer in July 2022 at age 50.

== Professional wins (7) ==
=== Nedbank Women's Golf Tour wins (7) ===
- 1995 South African Women's Open
- 1997 South African Women's Open
- 2000 South African Ladies Masters
- 2001 Nedbank Mastercard Classic
- 2002 Vodacom SA Ladies Players Championship, South African Women's Open, Nedbank Ladies SA Masters

== Results in LPGA majors ==
Adamson only played in the Women's British Open.

| Tournament | 2003 |
|---|---|
| Women's British Open | CUT |

CUT = missed the half-way cut

== Team appearances ==
Amateur

- Espirito Santo Trophy (representing South Africa): 1992, 1994
