= Paula Reto =

South African professional golfer (born 1990)

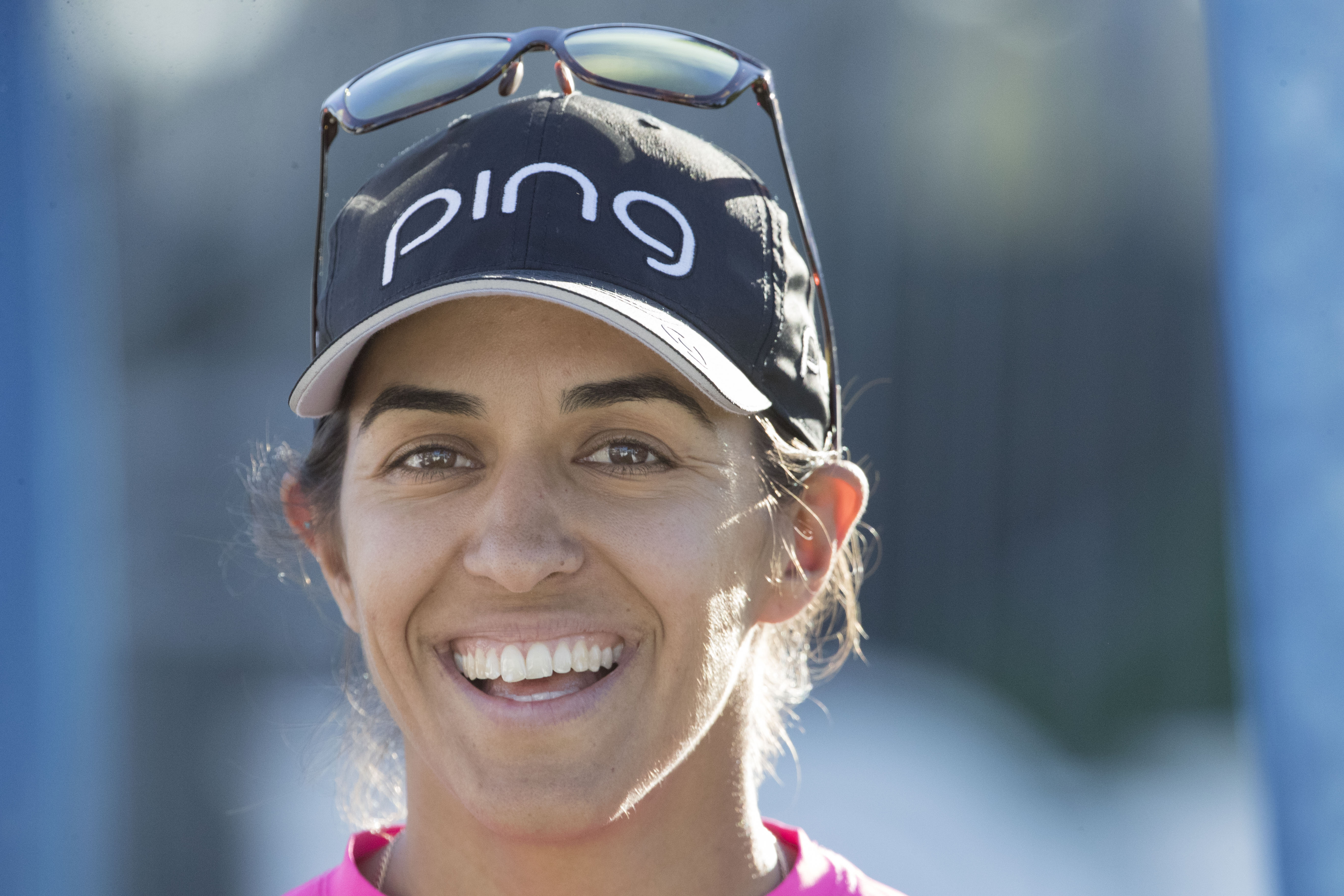
- Reto in 2017

Personal information
- Nationality: South Africa
- Born: 3 May 1990 (age 36) Cape Town, South Africa
- Height: 5 ft 6 in (168 cm)

Career
- Sport: Golf
- College: Purdue University
- Turned professional: 2013
- Current tour: LPGA Tour (2014–)
- Professional wins: 2

Number of wins by tour
- LPGA Tour: 1
- Other: 1

Best results in LPGA major championships
- Chevron Championship: T18: 2016
- Women's PGA C'ship: T30: 2022
- U.S. Women's Open: CUT: 2017, 2018, 2022, 2023, 2026
- Women's British Open: T24: 2021
- Evian Championship: T12: 2024

Achievements and awards
- Big Ten Conference Mary Fossum Award: 2013

Paula Reto (born 3 May 1990) is a South African professional golfer who plays on the LPGA Tour.

== Early life and amateur career ==
In 1990, Reto was born. She played field hockey and ran track in her youth and did not start playing golf until the age of 15, in 2005.

She played with the Purdue Boilermakers women's golf team between 2009 and 2012, and was a member of the 2010 NCAA National Championship team. She was a three-time First-Team All-Big Ten Conference selection (2011-2013), and a First-Team All-American in 2013. She earned an individual third-place finish at the 2013 NCAA Championships and was named the 2013 Mary Fossum Award winner for low stroke average in the Big Ten Conference.

Reto won the Dixie Amateur back to back in 2011 and 2012. In 2012, she reached the quarterfinals of the U.S. Women's Amateur Championship, eliminated by eventual champion and the world's top-ranked amateur, Lydia Ko.

== Professional career ==
Reto qualified for the LPGA Tour through Q-School on her first attempt in 2013 and turned professional. She tied for 13th place to earn full status for the 2014 season. She finished 77th on the 2014 official LPGA money list and was seventh in the Louise Suggs Rookie of the Year race. Reto recorded a solo third at the 2014 Yokohama Tire LPGA Classic. She had a three-shot lead in Prattville, Alabama after 36 holes and shared the lead after 54 holes.

In 2019 she was runner-up at the FireKeepers Casino Hotel Championship, two strokes behind Ssu-Chia Cheng.

Reto finished tied 16th at the 2016 Summer Olympics and qualified for the 2020 Summer Olympics, but was forced to withdraw due to the COVID-19 protocol.

She won her first LPGA Tour tournament at the Canadian Women's Open on 28 August 2022, scoring 62-69-67-67=265 (−19), for a one-stroke win over Nelly Korda and Choi Hye-jin. Her initial round 62 was a tournament record.

== Awards and honors ==
- While at Purdue University, she was a First-Team All-Big Ten Conference selection three times: in 2011, 2012, 2013
- In 2013, she was a First-Team All-American.
- In 2013, she earned the Mary Fossum Award winner for low stroke average in the Big Ten Conference.

== Amateur wins ==
- 2011 Dixie Amateur Championship
- 2012 Dixie Amateur Championship

== Professional wins (2) ==
=== LPGA Tour wins (1) ===
Legend
Major championships (0)
Other LPGA Tour (1)

No.	Date	Tournament	Winning score	To par	Margin of victory	Runner-up	Winner's share ($)
1	Aug 28, 2022	Canadian Women's Open	62-69-67-67=265	−19	1 stroke	(United States) Nelly Korda (South Korea) Choi Hye-jin	352,500

=== Sunshine Ladies Tour wins (1) ===
No.	Date	Tournament	Winning score	Margin of victory	Runner-up
1	21 Feb 2022	SuperSport Ladies Challenge	−13 (67-65-71=213)	10 strokes	(South Africa) Casandra Alexander

== Results in LPGA majors ==
Results not in chronological order.

Tournament	2014	2015	2016	2017	2018	2019	2020	2021	2022	2023	2024	2025	2026
Chevron Championship		T26	T18	T63					T25	CUT	T54	T71	69
U.S. Women's Open				CUT	CUT				CUT	CUT			CUT
Women's PGA Championship	T48	CUT	WD	CUT	CUT			70	T30	CUT	T60	T52	
The Evian Championship		CUT	T48				NT	WD	CUT	68	T12	T38	
Women's British Open		CUT	CUT					T24	T58	CUT	T29	CUT	

Did not play

CUT = missed the half-way cut
NT = no tournament
T = tied

=== Summary ===
Tournament	Wins	2nd	3rd	Top-5	Top-10	Top-25	Events	Cuts made
Chevron Championship	0	0	0	0	0	2	8	7
U.S. Women's Open	0	0	0	0	0	0	5	0
Women's PGA Championship	0	0	0	0	0	0	10	5
The Evian Championship	0	0	0	0	0	1	7	4
Women's British Open	0	0	0	0	0	1	7	3
Totals	0	0	0	0	0	4	37	19

- Most consecutive cuts made – 7 (2024 Chevron – 2025 Evian)
- Longest streak of top-10s – 0

== LPGA Tour career summary ==
Year	Tournaments played	Cuts made*	Wins	2nds	3rds	Top 10s	Best finish	Earnings ($)	Money list rank	Scoring average	Scoring rank
2014	20	9	0	0	1	2	3	154,880	77	72.79	108
2015	22	8	0	0	0	0	T13	102,187	88	73.31	118
2016	27	19	0	0	0	2	T9	224,371	74	71.73	58
2017	23	6	0	0	0	0	T15	55,267	131	72.86	143
2018	20	5	0	0	0	0	T21	29,669	143	74.04	157
2019	5	0	0	0	0	0	MC	0	n/a	73.75	n/a
2020	3	2	0	0	0	0	T28	15,036	138	71.89	n/a
2021	18	13	0	0	0	1	T7	225,811	76	71.05	53
2022	27	19	1	0	1	4	1	808,130	34	71.12	56
2023	27	13	0	0	0	2	T6	179,827	103	72.97	142
2024	28	21	0	0	0	0	T12	516,094	74	71.72	76
2025	25	17	0	0	0	2	7	348,531	77	71.47	70
Totals^	245	132	1	0	2	13	1	2,659,803	184		

^ As of 2025 season
* Includes matchplay and other tournaments without a cut.

== World ranking ==
Position in Women's World Golf Rankings at the end of each calendar year.

Year	Ranking	Source
2013	551	
2014	221	
2015	204	
2016	137	
2017	303	
2018	574	
2019	677	
2020	564	
2021	214	
2022	58	
2023	153	
2024	175	
2025	172	
