= Joburg Ladies Open =

Golf tournament on the Sunshine Ladies Tour in Johannesburg, South Africa

Tournament information
- Location: Johannesburg, South Africa
- Established: 2015
- Course: Modderfontein Golf Club
- Par: 73
- Tours: Ladies European Tour; Sunshine Ladies Tour
- Format: Stroke play
- Prize fund: €330,000
- Month played: April

Tournament record score
- Aggregate: 273 Agathe Laisne
- To par: −19 as above

Current champion
- (France) Agathe Laisne

Final champion
- Location in South Africa Location in Gauteng

The Joburg Ladies Open is a women's professional golf tournament held in Johannesburg, South Africa. It is an event on the Southern Africa-based Sunshine Ladies Tour since 2015 and starting in 2022 co-sanctioned with the Ladies European Tour.

== History ==
The tournament was played at the Royal Johannesburg & Kensington Golf Club until 2017. It moved to Modderfontein in 2018 and was played on to the refurbished Soweto Country Club for the following three years before returning.

== Winners ==
Year	Tours (Note: SLT − Sunshine Ladies Tour; LET − Ladies European Tour.)	Venue	Winner	Score	Margin of victory	Runner(s)-up	Note
Joburg Ladies Open
2026	SLT · LET	Randpark Golf Club	(France) Agathe Laisné	−19 (66-73-65-69=273)	Playoff	(South Africa) Casandra Alexander (Australia) Kirsten Rudgeley	
2025	SLT · LET	Modderfontein Golf Club	(England) Mimi Rhodes	−14 (65-69-71=205)	1 stroke	(South Africa) Casandra Alexander	
2024	SLT · LET	Modderfontein Golf Club	(Switzerland) Chiara Tamburlini	−17 (70-68-67-70=275)	7 strokes	(Thailand) Aunchisa Utama	
2023	SLT · LET	Modderfontein Golf Club	(England) Lily May Humphreys	−12 (70-70-73-67=280)	2 strokes	(Sweden) Moa Folke (Spain) Ana Peláez Triviño	
2022	SLT · LET	Modderfontein Golf Club	(Sweden) Linn Grant	−11 (72-69-67=208)	5 strokes	(Switzerland) Kim Métraux	
2021	SLT	Soweto Country Club	(South Africa) Casandra Hall	+1 (72-72-73=217)	1 stroke	(South Africa) Lee-Anne Pace	
2020	SLT	Soweto Country Club	(South Africa) Monique Smit	+1 (71-76-70=217)	2 strokes	(Czech Republic) Sideri Vanova	
2019	SLT	Soweto Country Club	(Eswatini) Nobuhle Dlamini	−2 (72-72-70=214)	4 strokes	(South Africa) Tandi McCallum	
2018	SLT	Modderfontein Golf Club	(South Africa) Ashleigh Buhai (2)	−8 (68-70-70=208)	5 strokes	(South Africa) Stacy Lee Bregman (South Africa) Ivanna Samu	
2017	SLT	Royal Johannesburg & Kensington Golf Club	(South Africa) Kim Williams	−11 (70-68-67=205)	5 strokes	(Namibia) Bonita Bredenhann (England) Lauren Taylor	
2016	SLT	Royal Johannesburg & Kensington Golf Club	(South Africa) Lee-Anne Pace	−12 (68-70-66=204)	5 strokes	(South Africa) Bertine Strauss	
Sunshine Ladies Tour Open
2015	SLT	Royal Johannesburg & Kensington Golf Club	(South Africa) Ashleigh Simon	−8 (71-65=136)	6 strokes	(South Africa) Monique Smit	

== See also ==
- Joburg Open
