= 2016 Sunshine Ladies Tour =

3rd season of the Sunshine Ladies Tour

2016 Sunshine Ladies Tour season
- Duration: November 2015 – March 2016
- Number of official events: 9
- Most wins: 4: (South Africa) Lee-Anne Pace
- Order of Merit winner: (South Africa) Lee-Anne Pace

The 2016 Sunshine Ladies Tour was the 3rd season of the Sunshine Ladies Tour, a series of professional golf tournaments for women based in South Africa.

== Schedule ==
The season consisted of 9 events, all held in South Africa, played between November 2015 and March 2016.

Date	Tournament	Venue	Winner	Purse (ZAR)	Notes
Dec 1	South African Women's Open	San Lameer Country Club	(South Africa) Lee-Anne Pace	250,000	
Jan 20	Joburg Ladies Open	Royal Johannesburg & Kensington Golf Club	(South Africa) Lee-Anne Pace	200,000	
Jan 27	Chase to Investec Cup Houghton	Houghton Golf Club	(England) Rebecca Hudson	200,000	
Feb 4	Ladies Tshwane Open	Zwartkop Country Club	(South Africa) Monique Smit	200,000	
Feb 12	Cape Town Ladies Open	Royal Cape Golf Club	(South Africa) Lee-Anne Pace	200,000	
Feb 21	Dimension Data Ladies Challenge	George Golf Club	(South Africa) Lee-Anne Pace	350,000	
Feb 26	Sun International Ladies Challenge	Gary Player Country Club	(South Africa) Bertine Strauss	200,000	
Mar 4	SuperSport Ladies Challenge	Huddle Park Golf Club	(South Africa) Bertine Strauss	200,000	
Mar 12	Chase to Investec Cup Final	Millvale Private Retreat	(South Africa) Bertine Strauss	1,000,000	

== Order of Merit ==
This shows the leaders in the final Order of Merit.

Rank	Player	Points
1	(South Africa) Lee-Anne Pace	2,250
2	(South Africa) Bertine Strauss	1,973
3	(South Africa) Monique Smit	1,896
4	(England) Rebecca Hudson	1,670
5	(South Africa) Ashleigh Buhai	1,575
