= 2017 Sunshine Ladies Tour =

4th season of the Sunshine Ladies Tour

2017 Sunshine Ladies Tour season
- Duration: January 2017 – May 2017
- Number of official events: 11
- Most wins: 3: (South Africa) Ashleigh Buhai
- Order of Merit winner: (South Africa) Ashleigh Buhai

The 2017 Sunshine Ladies Tour was the 4th season of the Sunshine Ladies Tour, a series of professional golf tournaments for women based in South Africa.

== Schedule ==
The season consisted of 11 events, ten in South Africa and one in Eswatini, played between January and May.

Date	Tournament	Venue	Winner(s)	Purse (ZAR)	Notes
Jan 4	SuperSport Ladies Challenge	Huddle Park Golf Club	(South Africa) Kim Williams	200,000	
Jan 19	South African Women's Masters	Rondebosch Golf Club	(South Korea) Carrie Park	500,000	
Jan 26	South African Women's Open	San Lameer Country Club	(South Africa) Lee-Anne Pace	250,000	
Jan 31	Ladies Tshwane Open	Zwartkop Country Club	(England) Kiran Matharu	400,000	
Feb 7	Cape Town Ladies Open	Royal Cape Golf Club	(South Africa) Ashleigh Buhai	200,000	
Feb 17	Dimension Data Ladies Challenge	George Golf Club	(South Africa) Nicole Garcia (South Korea) Carrie Park & L. King	500,000; 100,000	
Feb 21	Sunshine Ladies Tour Classic	Glendower Golf Club	(South Korea) Carrie Park	200,000	
Feb 28	Sun International Ladies Challenge	Lost City Golf Course	(South Africa) Ashleigh Buhai	200,000	
Mar 5	Joburg Ladies Open	Royal Johannesburg & Kensington Golf Club	(South Africa) Kim Williams	500,000	
Mar 10	Chase to Investec Cup Final	Millvale Private Retreat	(South Africa) Lee-Anne Pace	1,100,000	
May 3	Investec Royal Swazi (Ladies)	(Eswatini) Royal Swazi Spa Country Club	(South Africa) Ashleigh Buhai	100,000	Limited field event (Note: Six SLT players compete alongside the men in this Sunshine Tour event for a separate purse.)

== Order of Merit ==
This shows the leaders in the final Order of Merit.

Rank	Player	Points
1	(South Africa) Ashleigh Buhai	2,553
2	(England) Kiran Matharu	2,380
3	(South Africa) Lee-Anne Pace	2,281
4	(South Africa) Nicole Garcia	2,240
5	(South Africa) Kim Williams	2,016
