= Dorthea Forbrigd =

Norwegian professional golfer (born 2000)

Personal information
- Nationality: Norway
- Born: 27 May 1997 (age 29) Oslo, Norway
- Height: 172 cm (5 ft 8 in)

Career
- Sport: Golf
- College: East Carolina University
- Turned professional: 2021
- Current tour: Ladies European Tour (joined 2023)
- Former tour: LET Access Series (joined 2022)
- Professional wins: 2

Dorthea Forbrigd (born 27 May 1997) is a Norwegian professional golfer and Ladies European Tour (LET) player. She has won the Norwegian National Golf Championship twice, and was runner-up at the 2023 SuperSport Ladies Challenge in South Africa and the 2026 Dutch Ladies Open.

== Amateur career ==
Forbrigd was born in Oslo and represented Norway internationally, including at the 2014 World Junior Girls Championship in Canada, the 2018 World Amateur Team Championship in Ireland for the Espirito Santo Trophy, and the 2019 Spirit International Amateur championship in Texas.

She attended East Carolina University between 2017 and 2021, earning an undergraduate degree in finance and an MBA. Playing with the East Carolina Pirates women's golf team, she won five events individually including two conference championships, and recorded a program-best 73.13 career stroke average. As a freshman, she was named the American Women's Golf Player-of-the-Month for September 2017.

Forbrigd reached a career-best ranking of 41st in the World Amateur Golf Ranking.

== Professional career ==
Forbrigd turned professional in 2021 and earned status for the 2022 LET Access Series at LET Q-School. In 2023, she finished 3rd at the PGA Championship Gothenburg and runner-up at the Lombardia Ladies Open in Italy. She was runner-up at the 2023 SuperSport Ladies Challenge on the Sunshine Ladies Tour, and also made 11 LET starts with a best finish of tied 7th at the Dutch Ladies Open.

Forbrigd earned her full card for the 2024 Ladies European Tour by finishing 13th at LET Q-School, after a career-best final round of 65. Her best result in 2024 was a tie for 5th at the Dutch Ladies Open, and after only missing 3 cuts all season she finished 61st in the Order of Merit.

In 2025, Forbrigd tied for 4th at the Aramco Korea Championship, after suffering both a twisted ankle and a broken 6-iron during the second round. She missed out on a start in the 2025 U.S. Women's Open by a single stroke at the qualifying event in Italy.

== Amateur wins ==
- 2016 Norgescup 3, Titleist Tour 6
- 2017 Pirate Collegiate Classic
- 2018 The American Championship
- 2019 Lady Puerto Rico Classic, Pirate Collegiate Classic
- 2021 The American Championship

== Professional wins (2) ==
=== Other wins (2) ===
- 2019 Norwegian National Golf Championship (as an amateur)
- 2023 Norwegian National Golf Championship

== Playoff record ==
Ladies European Tour playoff record (0–1)

No.	Year	Tournament	Opponent	Result
1	2026	Dutch Ladies Open	(Thailand) Aunchisa Utama	Lost to birdie on first extra hole

== Team appearances ==
Amateur

- European Girls' Team Championship (representing Norway): 2014
- World Junior Girls Championship (representing Norway): 2014
- European Ladies' Team Championship (representing Norway): 2016
- Espirito Santo Trophy (representing Norway): 2018
- Spirit International Amateur (representing Norway): 2019
