= Casandra Alexander =

South African professional golfer (born 1999)

Personal information
- Nickname: Cas
- Nationality: South Africa
- Born: 13 August 1999 (age 27) South Africa
- Height: 5 ft 9 in (1.75 m)
- Spouse: Adrian Alexander (2022)

Career
- Sport: Golf
- Turned professional: 2018
- Current tours: Ladies European Tour (joined 2020); Sunshine Ladies Tour (joined 2019)
- Professional wins: 10

Number of wins by tour
- Ladies European Tour: 4
- Other: 6

Best results in LPGA major championships
- Chevron Championship: DNP
- Women's PGA C'ship: CUT: 2026
- U.S. Women's Open: T40: 2026
- Women's British Open: T7: 2024
- Evian Championship: T10: 2026

Achievements and awards
- Sunshine Ladies Tour Order of Merit: 2025
- Ladies European Tour Order of Merit: 2026

Casandra Alexander (née Hall, born 13 August 1999) is a South African professional golfer who plays on the Ladies European Tour (LET). She has four LET titles and won the team event of the Aramco Team Series twice. She also has six Sunshine Ladies Tour victories.

She competed as Casandra Hall until her marriage to Adrian Alexander, a bodybuilder, in 2022.

== Career ==
Alexander started playing golf at age 10 and her foremost achievement as an amateur was winning the South African Stroke Play Championship in 2018.

Alexander turned professional in late 2018 and joined the Sunshine Ladies Tour. In 2020, she won the Ladies Event at the Investec Royal Swazi Open, and in 2021, the Joburg Ladies Open. She finished second in the 2021 Order of Merit, behind Lee-Anne Pace.

Alexander become a member of the Ladies European Tour in January 2020, but missed most of the season due to the COVID-19 pandemic, unable to travel to Europe. In November, she made her breakthrough with victory in the Saudi Ladies Team International alongside Emily Kristine Pedersen and Michele Thomson. She holed the winning putt for a closing birdie on the 54th hole, sealing the victory for her team.

In 2021, she played 12 LET events and finished 73rd in the Order of Merit. In 2022, she tied for 4th at the Investec South African Women's Open three strokes behind the winner, her compatriot Lee-Anne Pace. She won the 2023 Aramco Team Series – Singapore team event with a team captained by Christine Wolf.

Alexander tied for 7th at the 2024 Women's British Open at Old Course at St Andrews, and in early 2025 she was runner-up at the Joburg Ladies Open and Investec South African Women's Open in back-to-back weeks, to climb into the top-100 on the Women's World Golf Rankings for the first time. In the process, she won the 2025 Sunshine Ladies Tour Order of Merit, having also won the Jabra Ladies Classic for a second time during the season.

In June 2025, she would win on the Ladies European Tour for the first time at the Tipsport Czech Ladies Open with an eagle on the 18th hole to win by 2 shots.

In 2026, she recorded runner-up finishes at the PIF Saudi Ladies International, Australian WPGA Championship, MCB Ladies Classic – Mauritius and Amundi German Masters, before winning the KPMG Women's Irish Open at the K Club by three strokes. After winning two further tournaments, the Ladies Italian Open and Wistron Ladies Open in Taiwan, she secured the 2026 LET Order of Merit title with two events remaining.

== Amateur wins ==
- 2018 South African Stroke Play Championship, Limpopo Championship

== Professional wins (10) ==
=== Ladies European Tour wins (4) ===
No.	Date	Tournament	Winning score	Margin of victory	Runner(s)-up
1	22 Jun 2025	Tipsport Czech Ladies Open	−17 (73-64-62=199)	2 strokes	(England) Esme Hamilton (Spain) Luna Sobrón
2	30 Aug 2026	KPMG Women's Irish Open	−20 (63-66-69-70=268)	3 strokes	(Czech Republic) Sára Kousková
3	27 Sep 2026	Buccellati Ladies Italian Open	−12 (67-68-69=204)	3 strokes	(Germany) Sophie Hausmann (United States) Anna Morgan
4	1 Nov 2026	Wistron Ladies Open	−21 (64-71-68-64=267)	3 strokes	(England) Hannah Screen

Ladies European Tour playoff record (0–1)

No.	Year	Tournament	Opponents	Result
1	2026	Joburg Ladies Open	(France) Agathe Laisné (Australia) Kirsten Rudgeley	Eliminated by birdie on first extra hole. Laisné won with birdie on fifth extra hole.

=== Sunshine Ladies Tour wins (6) ===
No.	Date	Tournament	Winning score	Margin of victory	Runner-up	Ref
1	28 Oct 2020	Investec Royal Swazi (Ladies)	4 pts (13, −6, −2, −1)	4 points	(South Africa) Nicole Garcia	
2	30 Apr 2021	Joburg Ladies Open	+1 (72-72-73=217)	1 stroke	(South Africa) Lee-Anne Pace	
3	3 Feb 2023	SuperSport Ladies Challenge	−9 (70-67-70=207)	6 strokes	(Norway) Dorthea Forbrigd	
4	24 Feb 2023	Jabra Ladies Classic	−14 (66-70-66=202)	1 stroke	(Spain) Mireia Prat	
5	6 Apr 2024	ABSA Ladies Invitational	−12 (68-70-66=204)	4 strokes	(Spain) Harang Lee	
6	28 Feb 2025	Jabra Ladies Classic	−14 (71-64-67=202)	4 strokes	(Scotland) Lorna McClymont	

== Results in LPGA majors ==
Tournament	2022	2023	2024	2025	2026
Chevron Championship					
U.S. Women's Open			72		T40
Women's PGA Championship					CUT
The Evian Championship				20	T10
Women's British Open	CUT		T7	T40	68

Top 10
Did not play

CUT = missed the half-way cut
T = tied
