= Tandi McCallum =

South African professional golfer

Personal information
- Nationality: South Africa
- Born: 17 April 1986 (age 40) Johannesburg, South Africa

Career
- Sport: Golf
- Turned professional: 2008
- Current tours: Ladies European Tour (2009–2013); Sunshine Ladies Tour (joined 2014)
- Professional wins: 3

Best results in LPGA major championships
- Chevron Championship: DNP
- Women's PGA C'ship: DNP
- U.S. Women's Open: DNP
- Women's British Open: CUT: 2012
- Evian Championship: DNP

Tandi McCallum (born 17 April 1986) is a South African professional golfer who played on the Ladies European Tour (LET). She was runner-up at the 2010 Women's Indian Open and the 2012 Lalla Meryem Cup.

== Career ==
McCallum started playing golf at age 15 and won six national amateur tournaments. She turned professional in 2008 and joined the LET in 2009. She secured her first professional win at the 2009 South African Women's Open but not a LET-sanctioned event at the time, she had to go back to Q-School at the end of her rookie year to keep her LET card. In 2010 she emerged as part of a 4-way playoff at the Hero Honda Women's Indian Open, eventually losing the playoff to Laura Davies.

In 2012 she finished tied second at the Lalla Meryem Cup together with Marianne Skarpnord, three strokes behind Karen Lunn. She started in the 2012 Women's British Open at Royal Liverpool Golf Club but did not make the cut. She also finished tied fourth at the South African Women's Open, two strokes behind Caroline Masson, ending the season a career best 50th in the LET Order of Merit.

Leaving the LET to join the Sunshine Ladies Tour in 2014 she won the Sun International Ladies Challenge and finished third in the inaugural Order of Merit, behind Lee-Anne Pace and Monique Smit. She was runner-up at the 2017 Dimension Data Ladies Challenge, 2018 and 2019 Investec Royal Swazi (Ladies), 2019 Joburg Ladies Open and 2020 SuperSport Ladies Challenge.

== Personal life ==
McCallum competed as Tandi Cuningham while married to fellow professional golfer Paul Cuningham, who was also her coach and caddie, and later as Tandi von Ruben.

== Professional wins (3) ==
=== Sunshine Ladies Tour wins (2) ===
- 2009 South African Women's Open
- 2014 Sun International Ladies Challenge

=== Swedish Golf Tour wins (1) ===
No.	Date	Tournament	Winning score	To par	Margin of victory	Runner-up
1	14 Jun 2011	Felix Finnish Ladies Open	68-70-71=209	–4	2 strokes	(Norway) Cecilie Lundgreen (Sweden) Elena Perrone

== Results in LPGA majors ==
McCallumn only played in the Women's British Open

Tournament	2012
Women's British Open	CUT

CUT = missed the half-way cut
