= Nicole Garcia (golfer) =

South African professional golfer

Personal information
- Nationality: South Africa
- Born: 10 December 1990 (age 35) Kempton Park, Gauteng, South Africa
- Height: 5 ft 4 in (1.63 m)

Career
- Sport: Golf
- College: University of Pretoria
- Turned professional: 2013
- Current tours: Ladies European Tour (joined 2014); Sunshine Ladies Tour
- Professional wins: 3

Best results in LPGA major championships
- Chevron Championship: DNP
- Women's PGA C'ship: DNP
- U.S. Women's Open: CUT: 2014, 2021, 2022
- Women's British Open: CUT: 2015, 2017
- Evian Championship: DNP

Nicole Garcia (born 10 December 1990) is a South African professional golfer playing on the Ladies European Tour (LET). She was runner-up at the 2015 Lalla Meryem Cup and captained the winning team at the 2022 Aramco Team Series – London.

== Amateur career ==
Garcia was born in Benoni, Gauteng to a Spanish father and British mother, and started playing golf at the age of 15. She attended the University of Pretoria and graduated in 2012 with a Bachelor in Sport Sciences. In 2013, Garcia won three amateur tournaments, the Free state and Northern Cape Championship, the Gauteng Central Championship, and the Gauteng North Championship.

== Professional career ==
Garcia turned professional at the end of 2013 after she finished T34 at the Lalla Aicha Tour School to earn conditional status for the 2014 Ladies European Tour, where she played in eight events and made two cuts. She returned to Q-School and finished T5, earning a full LET card for the 2015 season.

Garcia placed tied second at the U.S. Women's Open Sectional Qualifier in Buckinghamshire, England, and played her first major in the 2014 U.S. Women's Open at Pinehurst Resort.

On the LET, in 2015 she was runner-up at the Lalla Meryem Cup, two strokes behind Gwladys Nocera. In 2016 her best finish was sixth in the Qatar Ladies Open. In 2017, she received media attention on her way to finish T7 in the Andalucia Costa Del Sol Open De España, after her wayward tee-shot hopped into the front compartment of a referee's buggy, and she holed-out for par.

In 2018, Garcia suffered a serious hip and back injury, and surgery followed by rehab kept her sidelined for most of the 2019 and 2020 seasons. By 2021 she had recovered and finished tied for third in the South African Women's Open, three strokes behind Lee-Anne Pace, in the process securing a spot at the 2021 U.S. Women's Open.

In 2022, Garcia captained the winning team at the Aramco Team Series – London. Teamed with Kelly Whaley and Madelene Stavnar they tied on 27-under-par with a team made up of Ursula Wikström, Julia Engström and María Hernández. Garcia won the playoff against Wikström with a par on the first extra hole, the 18th hole at Centurion Club.

== Amateur wins ==
- 2013 Free state and Northern Cape Championship, Gauteng Central Championship, Gauteng North Championship

== Professional wins (3) ==
=== Sunshine Ladies Tour wins (3) ===
- 2015 Chase to Investec Cup Glendower
- 2017 Dimension Data Ladies Challenge
- 2020 Canon Serengeti Par-3 Challenge
