= Stacy Bregman =

South African professional golfer

Stacy Lee Bregman
Personal information
- Nationality: South Africa
- Born: 7 October 1986 (age 40) Johannesburg, South Africa
- Height: 161 cm (5 ft 3 in)

Career
- Sport: Golf
- Turned professional: 2006
- Current tours: Ladies European Tour (joined 2007); Sunshine Ladies Tour
- Former tour: Symetra Tour
- Professional wins: 7

Best results in LPGA major championships
- Chevron Championship: DNP
- Women's PGA C'ship: DNP
- U.S. Women's Open: DNP
- Women's British Open: T67: 2010
- Evian Championship: DNP

Achievements and awards
- Sunshine Ladies Tour Order of Merit winner: 2018

Stacy Lee Bregman (born 7 October 1986) is a South African professional golfer and Ladies European Tour (LET) player. She has three LET runner-up finishes and played on the winning team at the 2021 Aramco Team Series – Sotogrande. She has six Sunshine Ladies Tour titles and as amateur won the Espirito Santo Trophy.

== Amateur career ==
In her amateur career, Bregman won the Saab Junior twice. She was semi-finalist in the South African Amateur in 2005 and 2006 and reached the final 16 in the 2006 British Ladies Amateur Championship. She played on the winning South African Espirito Santo Trophy team in 2006 together with Kelli Shean and Ashleigh Simon.

== Professional career ==
Bregman turned professional in 2006 and joined the Ladies European Tour in 2007. Over her first 12 seasons, she recorded 17 top-10 finishes including as runner-up at the 2008 Turkish Ladies Open, the 2013 South African Women's Open and 2018 the Lacoste Ladies Open de France.

In 2014, she broke into the top 150 in the Women's World Golf Rankings, and in 2018 she finished 11th in the LET Order of Merit. She played on the 2018 Symetra Tour where she recorded one top-10 finish at the Forsyth Classic.

Bregman was part of the winning team at the 2021 Aramco Team Series – Sotogrande alongside Ashleigh Buhai and Hayley Davis.

In 2023, she clinched another Sunshine Ladies Tour title following a play-off with Lee-Anne Pace at Royal Johannesburg & Kensington Golf Club.

== Professional wins (7) ==
=== Sunshine Ladies Tour wins (7) ===
- 2008 Pam Golding Lowveld International
- 2014 Zambia Ladies Open
- 2015 Sun International Ladies Challenge, Dimension Data Ladies Pro-Am, Cape Town Ladies Open
- 2018 Canon Ladies Tshwane Open
- 2023 Standard Bank Ladies Open

== Results in LPGA majors ==
Results not in chronological order.

Tournament	2008	2009	2010	2011	2012	2013	2014
ANA Inspiration							
U.S. Women's Open							
Women's PGA Championship							
The Evian Championship ^							
Women's British Open	CUT		T67		CUT		CUT

^ The Evian Championship was added as a major in 2013.

Did not play

CUT = missed the half-way cut
"T" = tied

== Team appearances ==
Amateur

- Espirito Santo Trophy (representing South Africa): 2006 (winners)
