= Nobuhle Dlamini =

Eswatini professional golfer

Personal information
- Nationality: Eswatini
- Born: 6 November 1991 (age 34) Mbabane, Swaziland
- Height: 5 ft 4 in (163 cm)

Career
- Sport: Golf
- College: University of Pretoria
- Turned professional: 2014
- Current tours: Ladies European Tour (joined 2014); Sunshine Ladies Tour
- Professional wins: 7

Achievements and awards
- Sunshine Ladies Tour Order of Merit winner: 2019
- TuksSport Sportswoman of the Year: 2013

Nobuhle Dlamini (born 6 November 1991) is an Eswatini professional golfer playing on the Ladies European Tour (LET). She reached No. 2 on the World Amateur Golf Rankings in 2013 and is the first female professional golfer from her country.

== Early life and amateur career ==
Dlamini's path in golf began at age 12 when her father, Johannes Dlamini, introduced her to the game. He was a self-taught golfer and learned as a caddie at Royal Swazi Sun Country Club. Dlamini moved from Swaziland to Johannesburg, South Africa when she was 14 to attend high school, and later attended the University of Pretoria. She graduated in 2013 with a degree in sports management.

Dlamini won six titles and broke into the top ten on the World Amateur Golf Ranking in 2012. She reached world No. 2 in early 2013 and continued her winning ways with victories in the Eastern Cape Amateur Championship, Zwazula Natal Championship, North West Championships, South African Stroke Play, Gauteng Amateur Championship and took the individual prize in the WGSA 72-hole team championships.

== Professional career ==
Dlamini finished T4 at the LET Final Qualifying for the season 2014 and turned professional, becoming the first female professional golfer from her country. In her rookie year on tour, Dlamini played in 15 tournaments and made four cuts. She also started in the Czech Ladies Challenge on the LET Access Series, where she finished T3, one stroke away from a playoff. In 2015, she played mainly on the LET Access Series with a best finish at the Larvik Ladies Open, where she finished third, again one stroke away from a playoff.

In 2016, Dlamini attended the LPGA Q-School and made three starts on the U.S.-based Symetra Tour in 2017, making one cut.

In 2018 and 2019, she found success on the Sunshine Ladies Tour, where she won seven tournaments and the 2019 Order of Merit.

In 2019, Dlamini was back on the LET, with finishes of T12 in the Lacoste Ladies Open de France and T15 in the Estrella Damm Ladies Open. She was T24 at the inaugural Saudi Ladies International in 2020. She started 2021 with a T10 at the Investec South African Women's Open.

== Professional wins (7) ==
=== Sunshine Ladies Tour wins (7) ===
- 2018 (2) SuperSport Ladies Challenge, Investec Royal Swazi (Ladies)
- 2019 (5) Dimension Data Ladies Pro-Am, Joburg Ladies Open, Investec Royal Swazi (Ladies), VOG Selborne Ladies Pro-Am, VOG Final Ladies Pro-Am
