= South African Women's Open =

Women's golf tournament in South Africa

Coordinates: 33.9249°S 18.4241°E

Tournament information
- Location: Cape Town, South Africa
- Established: 1988
- Course: Royal Cape Golf Club
- Organized by: Women's PGA of South Africa
- Tours: Ladies European Tour; Sunshine Ladies Tour
- Format: Stroke play
- Month played: April

Tournament record score
- Aggregate: 266 Ashleigh Buhai (2023)
- To par: −22 as above

Current champion
- (England) Esme Hamilton

Location in South Africa

The South African Women's Open is a golf tournament. It was first played in 1988, is sanctioned by the Women's PGA of South Africa and is played as part of the Sunshine Ladies Tour. The tournament has been co-sanctioned by the Ladies European Tour 2012–2014 and from 2018 onwards.

The title sponsor is Investec and the host sponsor is the City of Cape Town.

== Winners ==
Year	Tour(s)	Course	Winner	Country	Score
Investec South African Women's Open
2026	SLT · LET	Royal Cape Golf Club	Esme Hamilton	England	277 (−15)
2025	SLT · LET	Erinvale Golf Estate	Perrine Delacour	France	274 (−14)
2024	SLT · LET	Erinvale Golf Estate	Manon De Roey	Belgium	274 (−14)
2023	SLT · LET	Steenberg Golf Club	Ashleigh Buhai (4)	South Africa	266 (−22)
2022	SLT · LET	Steenberg Golf Club	Lee-Anne Pace (5)	South Africa	288 (E)
2021	SLT · LET	Westlake Golf Club	Lee-Anne Pace (4)	South Africa	290 (+2)
2020	SLT · LET	Westlake Golf Club	Alice Hewson	England	211 (−5)
2019	SLT · LET	Westlake Golf Club	Diksha Dagar	India	211 (−5)
2018	SLT · LET	Westlake Golf Club	Ashleigh Buhai (3)	South Africa	207 (−9)
South African Women's Open
2017	SLT	San Lameer Country Club	Lee-Anne Pace (3)	South Africa	208 (−8)
2016	No tournament				
2015	SLT	San Lameer Country Club	Lee-Anne Pace (2)	South Africa	219 (+3)
Cell C South African Women's Open
2014	SLT · LET	San Lameer Country Club	Lee-Anne Pace	South Africa	211 (−5)
South African Women's Open
2013	SLT · LET	Southbroom Golf Club	Marianne Skarpnord	Norway	69 (−3) (Note: Tournament affected by adverse weather conditions.)
2012	LET	Selborne Park Golf Club	Caroline Masson	Germany	215 (−1)
2010–11	No tournament				
2009		Parkview Golf Club	Tandi Cuningham	South Africa	−12
Acer SA Women's Open
2008		Durban Country Club	Julie Tvede	Denmark	−8
2007		Durban Country Club	Ashleigh Simon (2)	South Africa	−6
2006		Durban Country Club	Rebecca Hudson	England	−2
2005		Royal Johannesburg	Maria Boden	Sweden	−2
2004		Royal Johannesburg	Ashleigh Simon	South Africa	−8
2003		Royal Johannesburg	Helena Svensson	Sweden	−5
South African Women's Open
2002		Devonvale Golf Club	Mandy Adamson (2)	South Africa	−8
2001		Devonvale Golf Club	Vanessa Smith	South Africa	−5
2000		Rondebosch Golf Club	Claire Duffy	United Kingdom	−4
1999		Rondebosch Golf Club	Barbara Pestana (2)	South Africa	−7
1998		Kensington Golf Club	Barbara Pestana	South Africa	−10
1997		Kyalami Golf Club	Mandy Adamson	South Africa	−2
1996		Kyalami Golf Club	Laurette Maritz (2)	South Africa	+4
1995		Observatory Golf Club	Mandy Adamson	South Africa	−1
1992–94	No tournament				
1991		Germiston Country Club	Brenda Lunsford (2)	United States	−7
1990		Germiston Country Club	Brenda Lunsford	United States	−3
1989		Germiston Country Club	Laurette Maritz	South Africa	−16
1988		Germiston Country Club	Elizabeth Glass	Zimbabwe	−5
