= Fancourt Hotel and Country Club =

Golf estate in George, Western Cape, South Africa

Coordinates: 33.95311°S 22.40716°E

Fancourt Hotel and Country Club is a South African golf estate in George, Western Cape (Garden Route District Municipality). It is rated among the top 10 lifestyle estates in the world.

The Links Course at Fancourt is rated as the number 1 golf course in South Africa by Golf Digest.

Fancourt hosted the 2003 Presidents Cup, the only time the event has ended in a tie.

It also hosted the 2005 Women's World Cup of Golf as well as the Coca-Cola Charity Championship on the Sunshine Tour.
