= Ashleigh Buhai =

South African professional golfer (born 1989)

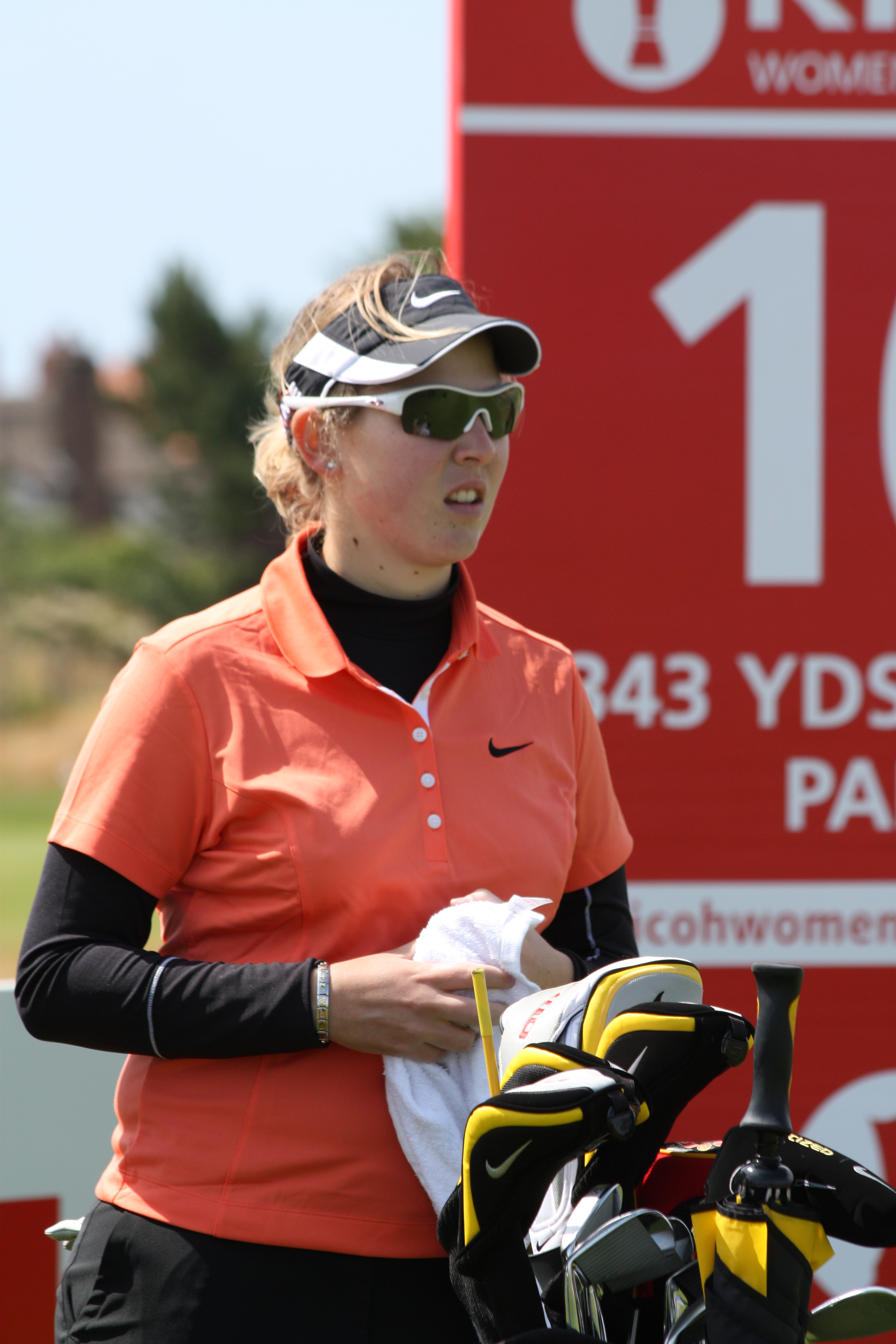
- Buhai in 2009

Personal information
- Full name: Ashleigh Ann Buhai
- Nationality: South Africa
- Born: 11 May 1989 (age 37) Johannesburg, South Africa
- Height: 5 ft 5 in (165 cm)
- Spouse: David Buhai (2016)

Career
- Sport: Golf
- Turned professional: 2007
- Current tours: Ladies European Tour; LPGA Tour
- Professional wins: 22

Number of wins by tour
- LPGA Tour: 2
- Ladies European Tour: 6
- WPGA Tour of Australasia: 2
- Other: 14

Best results in LPGA major championships (wins: 1)
- Chevron Championship: T18: 2023
- Women's PGA C'ship: T18: 2020
- U.S. Women's Open: T27: 2017
- Women's British Open: Won: 2022
- Evian Championship: T15: 2022

Achievements and awards
- Sunshine Ladies Tour Order of Merit: 2017

Ashleigh Ann Buhai (née Simon, born 11 May 1989) is a South African professional golfer who won the 2022 Women's Open, one of the major championships in women's golf.

== Amateur career ==
Buhai had a successful amateur career. She was the youngest player to win the ladies’ South African Amateur Stroke Play and Match Play double. She represented her country in the mainly professional Women's World Cup of Golf three times while still an amateur.

== Professional career ==
Buhai turned professional the day after her 18th birthday. She won the 2007 Catalonia Ladies Masters, which was her third event as a professional. She became the youngest ever professional winner on the Ladies European Tour (South Korea's Amy Yang won the 2006 ANZ Ladies Masters at a younger age as an amateur).

Ashleigh now plays under the name Ashleigh Buhai after marrying her husband, David, in December 2016.

Buhai earned her LPGA Tour card for 2014 at qualifying school.

On 7 August 2022, after 221 LPGA Tour starts, Buhai won her first major title by winning the AIG Women's Open at Muirfield, Scotland. She defeated Chun In-gee on the fourth hole of sudden-death playoff after both players finished regulation play at −10.

In December 2022, Buhai won the ISPS Handa Women's Australian Open by 1 stroke over Jiyai Shin. In December 2023, she successfully defended her ISPS Handa Women's Australian Open title with a 1 stroke victory over Minjee Lee at The Australian Golf Club

== Amateur wins ==
- 2004 Jack Newton Junior International Classic (Australia), South African Amateur Stroke Play, South African Amateur Match Play
- 2005 South African Amateur Stroke Play
- 2006 South African Amateur Stroke Play, South African Amateur Match Play, AJGA Rolex Tournament of Champions (USA)
- 2007 South African Amateur Stroke Play, South African Amateur Match Play

== Professional wins (22) ==
=== LPGA Tour wins (2) ===
Legend
Major championships (1)
Other LPGA Tour (1)

No.	Date	Tournament	Winning score	To par	Margin of victory	Runner(s)-up	Winner's share ($)
1	7 Aug 2022	AIG Women's Open^{[1]}	70-65-64-75=274	−10	Playoff	(South Korea) Chun In-gee	1,095,000
2	11 June 2023	ShopRite LPGA Classic	69-65-65=199	−14	1 stroke	(South Korea) Kim Hyo-joo	262,500

^{1} Co-sanctioned by the Ladies European Tour.

LPGA Tour playoff record (1–1)

No.	Year	Tournament	Opponent	Result
1	2020	Cambia Portland Classic	(England) Georgia Hall	Lost to par on second extra hole
2	2022	AIG Women's Open	(South Korea) Chun In-gee	Won with par on fourth extra hole

=== Ladies European Tour wins (5) ===
No.	Date	Tournament	Winning score	To par	Margin of victory	Runner(s)-up
1	17 June 2007	Catalonia Ladies Masters	70-68-70=208	−8	2 strokes	(Wales) Becky Brewerton (England) Kirsty Taylor
2	15 May 2011	ISPS Handa Portugal Ladies Open	66-67-67=200	−16	3 strokes	(France) Gwladys Nocera
3	10 Mar 2018	Investec South African Women's Open (3)^{[2]}	69-71-67=207	−9	2 strokes	(Germany) Karolin Lampert
4	7 Aug 2022	AIG Women's Open^{[3]}	70-65-64-75=274	−10	Playoff	(South Korea) Chun In-gee
5	11 Mar 2023	Investec South African Women's Open (4)^{[2]}	64-65-69-68=266	-22	4 strokes	(Spain) Ana Peláez

^{2} Co-sanctioned by the Sunshine Ladies Tour.
^{3} Co-sanctioned by the LPGA Tour.

Ladies European Tour playoff record (1–0)

No.	Year	Tournament	Opponent	Result
1	2022	AIG Women's Open	(South Korea) Chun In-gee	Won with par on fourth extra hole

=== WPGA Tour of Australasia wins (2) ===
- 2022 ISPS Handa Women's Australian Open
- 2023 ISPS Handa Women's Australian Open

=== Sunshine Ladies Tour wins (12) ===
- 2014 (3) Chase to Investec Cup Glendower, Ladies Tshwane Open, Chase to Investec Cup Blue Valley
- 2015 (1) Sunshine Ladies Tour Open
- 2017 (3) Cape Town Ladies Open, Sun International Ladies Challenge, Investec Royal Swazi (Ladies)
- 2018 (2) Joburg Ladies Open, Investec South African Women's Open^{[4]} (3)
- 2019 (1) Canon Sunshine Ladies Tour Open
- 2020 (1) Jabra Ladies Classic
- 2023 (1) Investec South African Women's Open^{[4]} (4)

^{4} Co-sanctioned by the Ladies European Tour.

=== Other wins (4) ===
- 2004 Acer South African Women's Open (as an amateur)
- 2005 Pam Golding Classic (Ladies Africa Tour) (as an amateur)
- 2006 Nedbank Masters (Ladies Africa Tour) (as an amateur)
- 2007 Acer South African Women's Open (2) (as an amateur)

== Major championships ==
=== Wins (1) ===
Year	Championship	54 holes	Winning score	Margin	Runner-up
2022	AIG Women's Open	Five shot lead	−10 (70-65-64-75=274)	Playoff	(South Korea) Chun In-gee

=== Results timeline ===
Results not in chronological order.

Tournament	2006	2007	2008	2009	2010	2011	2012	2013	2014	2015	2016	2017	2018	2019
Chevron Championship													CUT	T75
U.S. Women's Open			CUT						CUT		CUT	T27	T57	T55
Women's PGA Championship				T31					T40	CUT	T50	T36	T47	CUT
The Evian Championship ^									CUT				CUT	T37
Women's British Open	CUT	CUT		CUT	T43	CUT		T47	CUT	T66	T47	T30	CUT	5

Tournament	2020	2021	2022	2023	2024	2025	2026
Chevron Championship	CUT	CUT	CUT	T18	CUT	T62	CUT
U.S. Women's Open	T30	CUT		T68	T51	CUT	CUT
Women's PGA Championship	T18	CUT	T21	T39	T52	CUT	CUT
The Evian Championship	NT	T58	T15	T20	WD	CUT	CUT
Women's British Open	T11	CUT	1	CUT	T22	T50	T23

^ The Evian Championship was added as a major in 2013.

Win
Top 10
Did not play

CUT = missed the half-way cut
WD = withdrew
NT = no tournament
T = tied

=== Summary ===
Tournament	Wins	2nd	3rd	Top-5	Top-10	Top-25	Events	Cuts made
Chevron Championship	0	0	0	0	0	1	9	3
Women's PGA Championship	0	0	0	0	0	2	14	9
U.S. Women's Open	0	0	0	0	0	0	12	6
The Evian Championship	0	0	0	0	0	2	9	4
Women's British Open	1	0	0	2	2	5	19	11
Totals	1	0	0	2	2	10	63	33

- Most consecutive cuts made – 7 (2022 WPGA – 2023 Evian)
- Longest streak of top-10s – 1 (twice)

== LPGA Tour career summary ==
Year	Tournaments played	Cuts made*	Wins (Majors)	2nds	3rds	Top 10s	Best finish	Earnings ($)	Money list rank	Scoring average	Scoring rank
2005	1	1	0	0	0	0	12	n/a	n/a	n/a	n/a
2006	2	1	0	0	0	1	T7	n/a	n/a	n/a	n/a
2007	5	3	0	0	0	0	T16	n/a	n/a	n/a	n/a
2008	14	5	0	0	0	0	T35	20,330	157	74.27	144
2009	15	7	0	0	0	0	T23	39,752	118	73.18	101
2010	1	1	0	0	0	0	T43	12,810	140	73.25	n/a
2011	2	0	0	0	0	0	Cut	0	n/a	73.50	n/a
2012	0 **	0 **	0	0	0	0	T56	3,146 **	n/a	76.25	n/a
2013	1	1	0	0	0	0	T47	10,554	142	73.75	n/a
2014	18	9	0	0	0	0	T15	78,294	98	72.64	95
2015	17	8	0	0	0	0	T42	40,831	117	73.12	114
2016	16	8	0	0	0	0	T22	73,210	107	71.87	66
2017	21	10	0	1	1	3	2	461,094	42	71.60	66
2018	28	17	0	0	0	1	T7	254,692	72	71.93	77
2019	27	19	0	0	0	1	5	407,546	51	71.60	77
2020	16	14	0	1	0	3	2	429,628	24	71.83	55
2021	24	17	0	0	0	2	T8	229,695	75	71.27	63
2022	24	15	1 (1)	0	0	3	1	1,553,004	10	71.19	60
2023	23	17	1	0	1	6	1	1,016,049	26	70.76	33
2024	23	19	0	0	0	2	6	569,681	67	71.49	63
2025	22	14	0	0	0	2	T9	291,880	88	71.24	53
Totals^	292 (2008)	181 (2008)	2 (1)	2	2	24	1	5,489,050	88		

^ official as of 2025 season
* Includes matchplay and other tournaments without a cut.
** *ISPS Handa Women's Australian Open not counted by LPGA

== World ranking ==
Position in Women's World Golf Rankings at the end of each calendar year.

Year	World ranking	Source
2012	173	
2013	170	
2014	163	
2015	212	
2016	223	
2017	113	
2018	115	
2019	104	
2020	70	
2021	84	
2022	24	
2023	23	
2024	57	
2025	122	

== Team appearances ==
Amateur

- Espirito Santo Trophy (representing South Africa): 2004, 2006 (winners)

Professional

- World Cup (representing South Africa): 2005, 2006, 2007, 2008
