= Lee-Anne Pace =

South African professional golfer (born 1981)

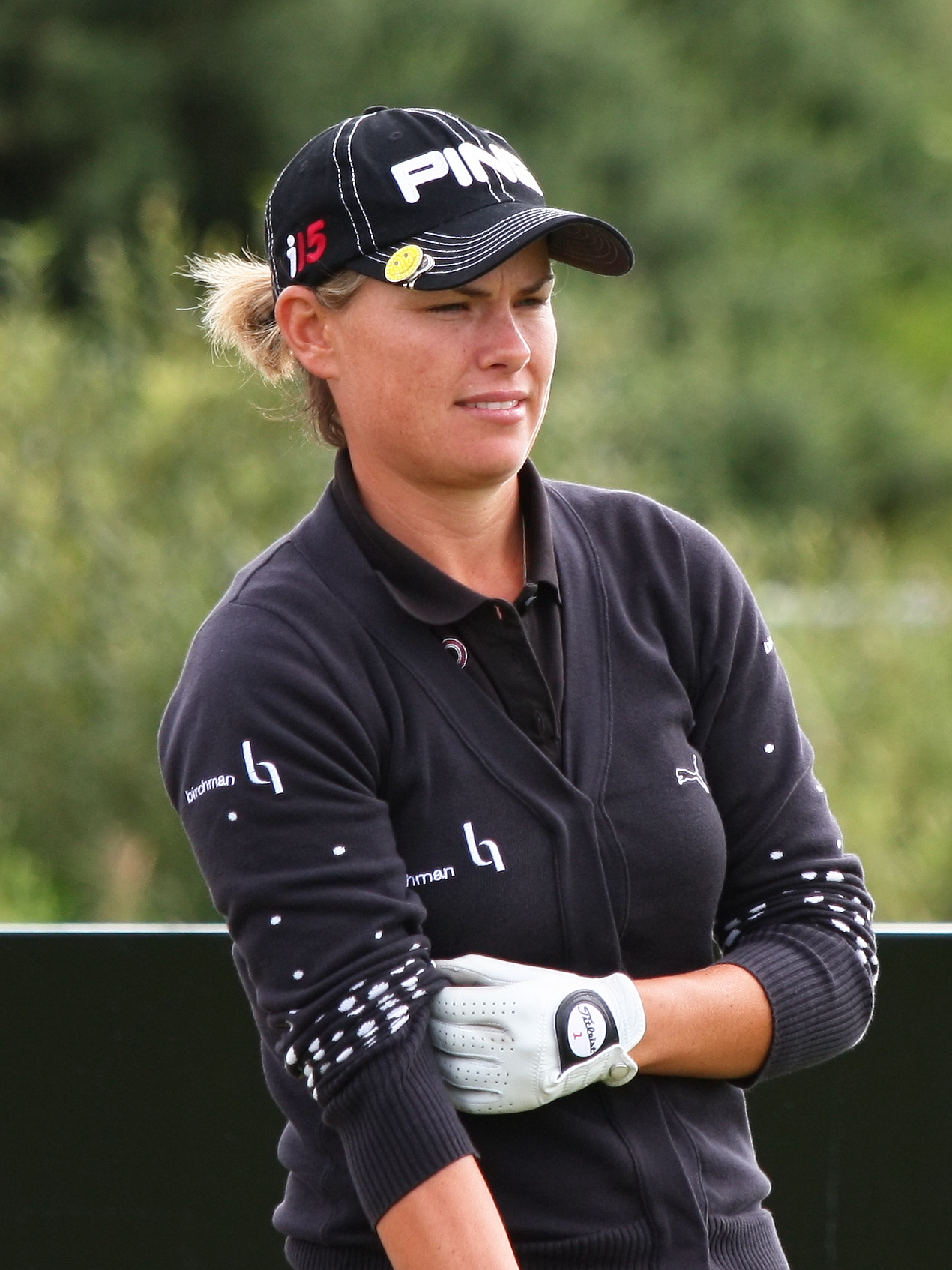
- Pace at the 2010 Women's British Open

Personal information
- Full name: Lee-Anne Pace
- Nationality: South Africa
- Born: 15 February 1981 (age 45) Paarl, South Africa
- Height: 1.68 m (5 ft 6 in)
- Spouse: Anne-Lise Caudal

Career
- Sport: Golf
- College: Murray State University, University of Tulsa
- Turned professional: 2005
- Current tour: Ladies European Tour
- Former tours: LPGA Tour; Futures Tour
- Professional wins: 23

Number of wins by tour
- LPGA Tour: 1
- Ladies European Tour: 11
- Other: 11

Best results in LPGA major championships
- Chevron Championship: T14: 2016
- Women's PGA C'ship: T30: 2023
- U.S. Women's Open: T43/43: 2014, 2017
- Women's British Open: T17: 2016
- Evian Championship: T6: 2015

Achievements and awards
- Ladies European Tour Order of Merit winner: 2010
- Ladies European Tour Player of the Year: 2010, 2013

Lee-Anne Pace (born 15 February 1981) is a South African professional golfer.

== Early life and amateur career ==
Pace was born in Paarl, Western Cape in 1981.

She had a successful amateur collegiate career in the United States, where she attended Murray State University and the University of Tulsa, graduating with a degree in psychology.

== Professional career ==
Pace turned professional in 2005. She played on the second tier Duramed Futures Tour in 2006 before qualifying for the LPGA Tour for 2007 at qualifying school. However, she lost her card in the United States at the end of 2007.

Pace qualified for the Ladies European Tour for 2008 via qualifying school. She made her breakthrough in 2010 with five wins at the Deutsche Bank Ladies Swiss Open, the S4C Wales Ladies Championship of Europe, the Finnair Masters, the Sanya Ladies Open, and the Suzhou Taihu Ladies Open. She ended the season at the top of the Order of Merit and won the LET Player of the Year.

After failing to win in 2012, Pace had another big season in 2013. Pace won her sixth Ladies European Tour event in May when she took a one stroke victory at the Turkish Airlines Ladies Open. She followed that victory up with another in July, again winning by a stroke, at the Open De España Femenino. She concluded the 2013 season by winning in a playoff at the Sanya Ladies Open. The victory was her eighth on tour and netted her a second LET Player of the Year award. In October 2014, Pace would win her ninth LET event when she was victorious in her home country, winning the Cell C South African Women's Open, in a playoff, after a final round comeback. A week later, Pace won her first LPGA Tour event at the Blue Bay LPGA in China.

== Personal life ==
In January 2024, Pace married fellow LET player Anne-Lise Caudal at a ceremony held in Yzerfontein, South Africa. The two became acquainted when Pace first started competing on the LET in 2008.

== Amateur wins ==
- 2003 Ohio Valley Conference Championship
- 2005 Western Athletic Conference Championship

== Professional wins (23) ==
=== LPGA Tour wins (1) ===
No.	Date	Tournament	Winning score	Margin of victory	Runner-up
1	26 Oct 2014	Blue Bay LPGA	−16 (67-66-67=200)	3 strokes	(Germany) Caroline Masson

=== Ladies European Tour wins (11) ===
No.	Date	Tournament	Winning score	Margin of victory	Runner(s)-up
1	20 Jun 2010	Deutsche Bank Ladies Swiss Open	−12 (69-67-68=204)	1 stroke	(Scotland) Vikki Laing
2	15 Aug 2010	S4C Wales Ladies Championship of Europe	−6 (74-71-67-70=282)	3 strokes	(England) Melissa Reid (Netherlands) Christel Boeljon
3	29 Aug 2010	Finnair Masters	−14 (66-64-69=199)	3 strokes	(Scotland) Vikki Laing
4	24 Oct 2010	Sanya Ladies Open	−11 (68-71-66=205)	1 stroke	(Austria) Stefanie Michl
5	31 Oct 2010	Suzhou Taihu Ladies Open	−5 (71-72-68=211)	Playoff	(United States) Hannah Jun (Paraguay) Julieta Granada (Netherlands) Christel Boeljon
6	12 May 2013	Turkish Airlines Ladies Open	−3 (70-77-70-72=289)	1 stroke	(Finland) Minea Blomqvist (Spain) Carlota Ciganda (England) Charley Hull
7	21 Jul 2013	Open De España Femenino	−13 (67-69-68-71=275)	1 stroke	(Sweden) Mikaela Parmlid
8	27 Oct 2013	Sanya Ladies Open	−13 (67-66-70=203)	Playoff	(China) Yu Yang Zhang
9	19 Oct 2014	Cell C South African Women's Open^{1}	−5 (71-73-67=211)	Playoff	(England) Holly Clyburn
10	16 May 2021	Investec South African Women's Open^{1}	+2 (70-75-73-72=290)	1 stroke	(Germany) Leonie Harm
11	2 Apr 2022	Investec South African Women's Open^{1}	E (71-73-74-70=288)	Playoff	(Argentina) Magdalena Simmermacher

^{1}Co-sanctioned by the Sunshine Ladies Tour

=== Sunshine Ladies Tour (14) ===
- 2013-2014 (1) Investec Ladies Cup
- 2014-2015 (4) South African Women's Open^{1}, Ladies Tshwane Open, SuperSport Ladies Challenge, Investec Ladies Cup
- 2015-2016 (4) South African Women's Open, Joburg Ladies Open, Cape Town Ladies Open, Dimension Data Ladies Challenge
- 2017 (1) Chase to Investec Cup Final
- 2018 (1) Cape Town Ladies Open
- 2020 (1) Cape Town Ladies Open
- 2021 (1) Investec South African Women's Open^{1}
- 2022 (1) Investec South African Women's Open^{1}

^{1}Co-sanctioned by the Ladies European Tour

== Results in LPGA majors ==
Results not in chronological order.

Tournament	2008	2009	2010	2011	2012
Chevron Championship				T70	CUT
U.S. Women's Open				T55	CUT
Women's PGA Championship					
Women's British Open	CUT			CUT	T39

Tournament	2013	2014	2015	2016	2017	2018	2019	2020	2021	2022	2023	2024
Chevron Championship		CUT	T69	T14	CUT							
U.S. Women's Open		T43	T56	CUT	43				T64			
Women's PGA Championship		CUT	T62	WD	T64	DQ	CUT				T30	
The Evian Championship ^		T54	T6	T43	T48	CUT		NT	CUT	CUT		
Women's British Open	T25	T29	T24	T17	CUT	CUT		T32	WD	65	CUT	T55

^ The Evian Championship was added as a major in 2013.

Top 10
Did not play

CUT = missed the half-way cut
DQ = disqualified
WD = withdrew
NT = no tournament
T = tied

=== Summary ===
Tournament	Wins	2nd	3rd	Top-5	Top-10	Top-25	Events	Cuts made
Chevron Championship	0	0	0	0	0	1	6	3
U.S. Women's Open	0	0	0	0	0	0	7	5
Women's PGA Championship	0	0	0	0	0	0	7	3
The Evian Championship	0	0	0	0	1	1	7	4
Women's British Open	0	0	0	0	0	3	14	8
Totals	0	0	0	0	1	5	41	23

- Most consecutive cuts made – 7 (2014 Evian – 2016 ANA)
- Longest streak of top-10s – 1

== Team appearances ==
Amateur

- Espirito Santo Trophy (representing South Africa): 2002, 2004

== See also ==
- List of golfers with most Ladies European Tour wins
