= Sunshine Ladies Tour =

Golf tournament series in South Africa

- Current season, competition or edition: 2026 Sunshine Ladies Tour
- Sport: Golf
- Founder: Women's PGA of South Africa (WPGA)
- First season: 2014
- CEO: Thomas Abt
- Country: South Africa; Schedule has included events in Eswatini, Zambia and Mauritius.
- Headquarters: Somerset West, Western Cape
- Most recent champions: (South Africa) Casandra Alexander (2026 Order of Merit winner)
- Most titles: (South Africa) Lee-Anne Pace (14)
- Related competitions: Sunshine Tour
- Website: sunshineladiestour.com

The Sunshine Ladies Tour is a professional golf tour for women based in South Africa.

== Schedule ==
Since the inaugural 2014 season, tournaments have averaged around ten per season and been concentrated in the January–April window. Sponsors have included Investec, Jabra, Dimension Data, Sun International, SuperSport, Canon, the municipalities of Joburg, Cape Town and Ray Nkonyeni and Serengeti Estates. In 2019, over 40 foreign players, mainly European, competed on the tour.

== Cooperation ==
The Ladies European Tour co-sanctions the flagship Investec South African Women's Open, and the champion receives a tournament winner's category exemption on the Ladies European Tour, as well as exemption into the two of the five majors that are held in Europe, Women's British Open and the Evian Championship.

Also, the winner of the Jabra Ladies Classic earns exemption for the Jabra Ladies Open de France, the final qualifying event for the Evian Championship.

== Flagship tournaments ==
- South African Women's Open – founded in 1988 and co-sanctioned by the Ladies European Tour
- South African Women's Masters – founded in 1996 and co-sanctioned by the Ladies European Tour in 2001

== Order of Merit winners ==
Year	Player	Country
2026	Casandra Alexander	South Africa
2025	Casandra Alexander	South Africa
2024	Gabriella Cowley	England
2023	Lily May Humphreys	England
2022	Linn Grant	Sweden
2021	Lee-Anne Pace	South Africa
2020	Monique Smit	South Africa
2019	Nobuhle Dlamini	Eswatini
2018	Stacy Bregman	South Africa
2017	Ashleigh Buhai	South Africa
2016	Lee-Anne Pace	South Africa
2015	Lee-Anne Pace	South Africa
2014	Lee-Anne Pace	South Africa

== See also ==
- Sunshine Tour – corresponding men's tour
