= 2022 Women's British Open =

Golf tournament

2022 AIG Women's Open
Tournament information
- Dates: 4–7 August 2022
- Location: Gullane, East Lothian, Scotland; 56.023°N 2.491°W
- Course: Muirfield
- Organized by: The R&A
- Tours: Ladies European Tour; LPGA Tour

Statistics
- Par: 71
- Length: 6,649 yards (6,080 m)
- Field: 144 players, 65 after cut
- Cut: 145 (+3)
- Prize fund: $7,300,000
- Winner's share: $1,095,000

Champion
- (South Africa) Ashleigh Buhai
- 274 (−10), playoff
- Location in the United Kingdom Location in Scotland

The 2022 AIG Women's Open was played from 4 to 7 August in Scotland at Muirfield. It was the 46th Women's British Open, the 22nd as a major championship on the LPGA Tour, and the third championship held under a sponsorship agreement with AIG. It was the first Women's British Open to be hosted at Muirfield.

== Field ==
The field was made up of 144 players. As with previous tournaments, most players earned exemptions based on past performance on the Ladies European Tour, the LPGA Tour, previous major championships, or with a high ranking in the Women's World Golf Rankings. The rest of the field earned entry by successfully competing in qualifying tournaments open to any female golfer, professional or amateur, with a low handicap.

=== Exemptions ===
Players who qualified for the event are listed below. Players are listed under the first category in which they qualified.

1. Winners of the Women's British Open, aged 60 or younger at the scheduled end of the championship, provided they are still active members of a recognised tour.

- Laura Davies
- Georgia Hall
- Ariya Jutanugarn
- Kim In-Kyung
- Stacy Lewis
- Mo Martin
- Catriona Matthew
- Anna Nordqvist
- Inbee Park
- Sophia Popov
- Hinako Shibuno
- Helen Alfredsson, Sophie Gustafson, Jang Jeong, Emilee Klein, Karen Lunn, Liselotte Neumann, Lorena Ochoa, Pak Se-ri, Jiyai Shin, Annika Sörenstam, Sherri Steinhauer, Karen Stupples, Yani Tseng, and Karrie Webb did not play

2. The top 10 finishers and ties from the 2021 Women's British Open.

- Louise Duncan
- Leonie Harm
- Moriya Jutanugarn
- Minjee Lee
- Nanna Koerstz Madsen
- Madelene Sagström
- Lizette Salas
- Patty Tavatanakit
- Marissa Steen did not play

3. The top 15 on the final 2021 LET Order of Merit.

- Pia Babnik
- Carlota Ciganda
- Olivia Cowan
- Lydia Hall
- Alice Hewson
- Charley Hull
- Stephanie Kyriacou
- Sanna Nuutinen
- Lee-Anne Pace
- Magdalena Simmermacher
- Marianne Skarpnord
- Maja Stark
- Atthaya Thitikul

4. The top 5 on the 2022 LET Order of Merit not already exempt as of 11 July.

- Casandra Alexander
- Becky Brewerton
- Johanna Gustavsson
- Whitney Hillier
- Michele Thomson

5. The top 35 on the final 2021 Race to the CME Globe points list.

- Pajaree Anannarukarn
- Céline Boutier
- Matilda Castren
- Chun In-gee
- Ally Ewing
- Mina Harigae
- Nasa Hataoka
- Brooke Henderson
- Megan Khang
- Kim Hyo-joo
- Kim Sei-young
- Ko Jin-young
- Lydia Ko
- Jessica Korda
- Nelly Korda
- Jennifer Kupcho
- Lee Jeong-eun
- Gaby López
- Leona Maguire
- Ryann O'Toole
- Ryu So-yeon
- Yuka Saso
- Lexi Thompson
- Amy Yang

6. The top 25 on the 2021 Race to the CME Globe points list not already exempt as of 11 July.

- Brittany Altomare
- Ashleigh Buhai
- Chella Choi
- Allisen Corpuz
- Perrine Delacour
- Gemma Dryburgh
- Jodi Ewart Shadoff
- Cheyenne Knight
- Maude-Aimee Leblanc
- Alison Lee
- Andrea Lee
- Caroline Masson
- Stephanie Meadow
- Annie Park
- Paula Reto
- Sarah Schmelzel
- Jenny Shin
- Lauren Stephenson
- Thidapa Suwannapura
- Emma Talley
- Kelly Tan
- Albane Valenzuela
- Lilia Vu
- Lindsey Weaver-Wright
- Angel Yin

7. The top 50 in the Women's World Golf Rankings as of 27 June.

- An Na-rin
- Choi Hye-jin
- Ayaka Furue
- Hong Jung-min
- Hsu Wei-ling
- Minami Katsu
- Lee Jeong-eun
- Lin Xiyu
- Yuna Nishimura
- Yealimi Noh
- Su-Hyun Oh
- Amy Olson
- Emily Kristine Pedersen
- Mel Reid
- Sophia Schubert

8. The top 3 on the JLPGA Money List not already exempt as of the Suntory Ladies Open (12 June)

- Kotone Hori
- Mao Saigo
- Sayaka Takahashi

9. The top 2 on the KLPGA Money List not already exempt as of 27 June

10. Winners of any recognised LET or LPGA Tour events in the 2022 calendar year.

- Marina Alex
- Manon De Roey
- Linn Grant
- Esther Henseleit
- Ji Eun-hee
- Tiia Koivisto
- Bronte Law
- Meghan MacLaren
- Jana Melichova (a)
- Morgane Métraux
- Ana Peláez

11. Winners of the 2021 JLPGA Money List and KLPGA Money List.

12. Winners of the last five editions of the U.S. Women's Open

- Kim A-lim

13. Winners of the last five editions of the Chevron Championship

14. Winners of the last five editions of the Women's PGA Championship

- Hannah Green
- Park Sung-hyun

15. Winners of the last five editions of The Evian Championship

- Angela Stanford

16. The leading two (not otherwise exempt) in the 2022 Suntory Ladies Open

- Saiki Fujita
- Miyū Yamashita

17. The 2021 Women's Amateur Asia-Pacific champion, 2021 Women's Amateur Latin America champion, 2022 Women's Amateur Championship champions, 2022 European Ladies Amateur Championship champion, the 2022 Augusta National Women's Amateur champion, the 2021 Mark H. McCormack Medal winner, and the highest ranked women in the World Amateur Golf Ranking from Great Britain and Ireland as of week 25, and provided they are still amateurs at the time of the championship.

- Jess Baker (a)
- Anna Davis (a)
- Savannah De Bock (a)
- Mizuki Hashimoto (a)
- Caley McGinty (a)
- Valery Plata (a)
- Rose Zhang (a)

18. Any player who did not compete in the previous year's Women's British Open due to maternity, who subsequently received an extension of membership for the maternity from the player's home tour in the previous year, provided she was otherwise qualified to compete in the previous year's Women's British Open.

- Mariajo Uribe

19. The leading three players (not otherwise exempt) in the 2022 Trust Golf Women's Scottish Open

- Carmen Alonso
- Wichanee Meechai
- Chanettee Wannasaen

=== Final Qualifying ===
Final Qualifying event was played over 18 holes on 1 August at North Berwick. 12 qualifying places were available for the championship.

- Aditi Ashok
- Nicole Broch Estrup
- Jennifer Chang
- Peiyun Chien
- Lauren Coughlin
- Diksha Dagar
- Hayley Davis
- Céline Herbin
- Janie Jackson
- Ingrid Lindblad (a)
- Ursula Wikström
- Liz Young

== Round summaries ==
=== First round ===
Thursday, 4 August 2022

Place	Player	Score	To par
1	(Japan) Hinako Shibuno	65	−6
2	(United States) Jessica Korda	66	−5
T3	(Scotland) Louise Duncan	67	−4
T3	(Mexico) Gaby López	67	−4
T5	(France) Céline Boutier	68	−3
T5	(South Korea) Chun In-gee	68	−3
T5	(England) Jodi Ewart Shadoff	68	−3
T5	(Australia) Minjee Lee	68	−3
T5	(Sweden) Maja Stark	68	−3
T10	(South Korea) Choi Hye-jin	69	−2
T10	(South Korea) Inbee Park	69	−2
T10	(Japan) Miyū Yamashita	69	−2

=== Second round ===
Friday, 5 August 2022

Place	Player	Score	To par
1	(South Korea) Chun In-gee	68-66=134	−8
T2	(South Africa) Ashleigh Buhai	70-65=135	−7
T2	(Sweden) Madelene Sagström	70-65=135	−7
4	(South Korea) Inbee Park	69-67=136	−6
T5	(Australia) Hannah Green	71-66=137	−5
T5	(Japan) Miyū Yamashita	69-68=137	−5
T7	(France) Céline Boutier	68-70=138	−4
T7	(Australia) Stephanie Kyriacou	70-68=138	−4
T7	(Australia) Minjee Lee	68-70=138	−4
T7	(Japan) Hinako Shibuno	65-73=138	−4

=== Third round ===
Saturday, 6 August 2022

Place	Player	Score	To par
1	(South Africa) Ashleigh Buhai	70-65-64=199	−14
T2	(South Korea) Chun In-gee	68-66-70=204	−9
T2	(Japan) Hinako Shibuno	65-73-66=204	−9
T4	(South Korea) Inbee Park	69-67-70=206	−7
T4	(Sweden) Madelene Sagström	70-65-71=206	−7
T6	(Australia) Stephanie Kyriacou	70-68-70=208	−5
T6	(Australia) Minjee Lee	68-70-70=208	−5
T6	(Japan) Miyū Yamashita	69-68-71=208	−5
T9	(South Korea) Choi Hye-jin	69-70-70=209	−4
T9	(Canada) Brooke Henderson	70-70-69=209	−4
T9	(South Korea) Kim Hyo-joo	73-66-70=209	−4
T9	(South Korea) Park Sung-hyun	72-69-68=209	−4
T9	(Sweden) Maja Stark	68-71-70=209	−4
T9	(Thailand) Atthaya Thitikul	71-69-69=209	−4

=== Final round ===
Sunday, 7 August 2022

Place	Player	Score	To par	Prize money (US$)
T1	(South Africa) Ashleigh Buhai	70-65-64-75=274	−10	Playoff
T1	(South Korea) Chun In-gee	68-66-70-70=274	−10	Playoff
3	(Japan) Hinako Shibuno	65-73-66-71=275	−9	488,285
T4	(Australia) Minjee Lee	68-70-70-69=277	−7	309,546
T4	(Republic of Ireland) Leona Maguire	71-69-71-66=277	−7	309,546
T4	(Sweden) Madelene Sagström	70-65-71-71=277	−7	309,546
T7	(France) Céline Boutier	68-70-74-67=279	−5	160,700
T7	(Japan) Nasa Hataoka	71-69-71-68=279	−5	160,700
T7	(Canada) Brooke Henderson	70-70-69-70=279	−5	160,700
T7	(Australia) Lydia Ko	71-70-70-68=279	−5	160,700
T7	(Australia) Stephanie Kyriacou	70-68-70-71=279	−5	160,700
T7	(Thailand) Atthaya Thitikul	71-69-69-70=279	−5	160,700

=== Playoff ===
The sudden-death playoff was held over the 18th hole until there was a winner.

Place	Player	Scores	Prize money (US$)
1	(South Africa) Ashleigh Buhai	4-5-4-4=17	1,095,000
2	(South Korea) Chun In-gee	4-5-4-5=18	673,743
