= 2021 Evian Championship =

Tournament information
- Dates: 22–25 July 2021
- Location: Évian-les-Bains, France; 46.394°N 6.570°E
- Course: Evian Resort Golf Club
- Tours: Ladies European Tour; LPGA Tour

Statistics
- Par: 71
- Length: 6,527 yards (5,968 m)
- Field: 126, 77 after cut
- Cut: 143 (+1)
- Prize fund: $4,500,000
- Winner's share: $675,000

Champion
- (Australia) Minjee Lee
- 266 (−18), Playoff

Location map
- Location in France Location in Auvergne-Rhône-Alpes

The 2021 Amundi Evian Championship was played 22–25 July at the Evian Resort Golf Club in Évian-les-Bains, France. It was the 27th Evian Championship (the first 20 played as the Evian Masters), and the eighth as a major championship on the LPGA Tour.

Minjee Lee won her first major at the first hole of a sudden-death playoff over Lee Jeong-eun.

== Field ==
The field for the tournament was set at 126, and most earned exemptions based on past performance on the Ladies European Tour, the LPGA Tour, or with a high ranking in the Women's World Golf Rankings.

These were the exemption categories for the 2021 Evian Championship.

1. Evian invitations (six)

María Fassi, Tsubasa Kajitani (a), Lucie Malchirand, Brooke Matthews (a), Pauline Roussin-Bouchard (a), Natalie Srinivasan

2. Top player from the Jabra Ladies Open

Pia Babnik

3. Top player from the Island Resort Championship on the Symetra Tour

Morgane Métraux

4. The top 40 in the Women's World Golf Rankings

Carlota Ciganda, Austin Ernst, Ally Ewing, Ayaka Furue, Brooke Henderson, M. J. Hur, Ariya Jutanugarn, Moriya Jutanugarn, Megan Khang, Kim A-lim, Kim Hyo-joo, Kim Sei-young, Ko Jin-young, Lydia Ko, Jessica Korda, Nelly Korda, Jennifer Kupcho, Lee Jeong-eun, Minjee Lee, Mirim Lee, Amy Olson, Inbee Park, Park Sung-hyun, Sophia Popov, Ryu So-yeon, Lizette Salas

5. Past Evian Championship winners

Chun In-gee, Paula Creamer, Natalie Gulbis, Anna Nordqvist, Angela Stanford

6. Winners of the other women's majors for the last five years

Georgia Hall, Brittany Lang, Pernilla Lindberg

7. LPGA Tour winners

Matilda Castren, Hsu Wei-ling, Cheyenne Knight, Park Hee-young, Madelene Sagström

8. LET winners

Carly Booth, Esther Henseleit, Alice Hewson, Stephanie Kyriacou, Emily Kristine Pedersen, Anne van Dam, Christine Wolf

9. The top five on the LET Order of Merit

Olivia Cowan, Leonie Harm, Sanna Nuutinen, Lee-Anne Pace, Atthaya Thitikul

10. 2021 U.S. Women's Amateur champion

Rose Zhang (a)

11. 2021 British Ladies Amateur champion

Aline Krauter (a)

12. Any player who qualified for the previous Evian but did not compete due to maternity

Brittany Lincicome

13. LPGA Tour CME Globe points list (if needed to fill the field to 126)

Marina Alex, Brittany Altomare, Pajaree Anannarukarn, Dottie Ardina, Aditi Ashok, Ana Belac, Céline Boutier, Nicole Broch Larsen, Ashleigh Buhai, Jennifer Chang, Ssu-Chia Cheng, Chella Choi, Cydney Clanton, Jenny Coleman, Perrine Delacour, Lindy Duncan, Jodi Ewart Shadoff, Dana Finkelstein, Kristen Gillman, Jaye Marie Green, Mina Harigae, Muni He, Céline Herbin, Daniela Holmqvist, Charley Hull, Ji Eun-hee, Haeji Kang, Sarah Kemp, Christina Kim, Katherine Kirk, Bronte Law, Alison Lee, Lee Jeong-eun, Lee Mi-hyang, Min Lee, Yu Liu, Nanna Koerstz Madsen, Leona Maguire, Caroline Masson, Stephanie Meadow, Wichanee Meechai, Giulia Molinaro, Azahara Muñoz, Yealimi Noh, Su-Hyun Oh, Ryann O'Toole, Pornanong Phatlum, Gerina Piller, Paula Reto, Sarah Schmelzel, Alena Sharp, Jenny Shin, Luna Sobrón, Jennifer Song, Marissa Steen, Lauren Stephenson, Jasmine Suwannapura, Elizabeth Szokol, Emma Talley, Albane Valenzuela, Lindsey Weaver, Jing Yan, Angel Yin

== Course ==
Hole	1	2	3	4	5	6	7	8	9	Out	10	11	12	13	14	15	16	17	18	In	Total
Par	4	3	4	4	3	4	5	3	5	35	4	4	4	4	3	5	3	4	5	36	71
Yards	399	165	355	434	188	378	545	189	515	3,168	417	353	406	437	226	550	155	331	484	3,355	6,527
Metres	365	151	325	397	172	346	498	173	471	2,898	381	323	371	399	207	503	142	303	443	3,069	5,970

== Round summaries ==
=== First round ===
Thursday, 22 July 2021

Pajaree Anannarukarn and Yealimi Noh shot rounds of 65 (−6) to take a one stroke lead over five golfers. Defending champion Ko Jin-young shot a 72 and was seven strokes back in a tied for 76th place. World number one Nelly Korda was two strokes further back with a 74 in 99th place.

Place	Player	Score	To par
T1	(Thailand) Pajaree Anannarukarn	65	−6
T1	(United States) Yealimi Noh	65	−6
T3	(Japan) Ayaka Furue	66	−5
T3	(South Korea) Lee Jeong-eun	66	−5
T3	(Denmark) Emily Kristine Pedersen	66	−5
T3	(United States) Lauren Stephenson	66	−5
T3	(Thailand) Atthaya Thitikul	66	−5
T8	(Thailand) Ariya Jutanugarn	67	−4
T8	(Australia) Sarah Kemp	67	−4
T8	(South Korea) Kim Hyo-joo	67	−4

=== Second round ===
Friday, 23 July 2021

Lee Jeong-eun shot a second round 61 to take the lead by three strokes over Pajaree Anannarukarn and Ariya Jutanugarn. Her 61 was the lowest round ever in a major and her two-round total of 127 was also a major record. The cut came at 143 (+1) with 77 players advancing to the weekend. Both defending champion Ko Jin-young and world number one Nelly Korda improved their positions and made the cut with totals of 141, tied for 40th.

Place	Player	Score	To par
1	(South Korea) Lee Jeong-eun	66-61=127	−15
T2	(Thailand) Pajaree Anannarukarn	65-65=130	−12
T2	(Thailand) Ariya Jutanugarn	67-63=130	−12
T4	(New Zealand) Lydia Ko	68-65=133	−9
T4	(United States) Yealimi Noh	65-68=133	−9
6	(Japan) Ayaka Furue	66-68=134	−8
T7	(South Korea) Kim Hyo-joo	67-68=135	−7
T7	(South Korea) Inbee Park	71-64=135	−7
T7	(United States) Lauren Stephenson	66-69=135	−7
T7	(Thailand) Atthaya Thitikul	66-69=135	−7

=== Third round ===
Saturday, 24 July 2021

Second round leader Lee Jeong-eun extended her lead by shooting a 3-under-par 68. She had a 5-stroke lead over Yealimi Noh. World number one Nelly Korda shot 69 to improve to T-32 while defending champion Ko Jin-young had a 76 to drop 74th place.

Place	Player	Score	To par
1	(South Korea) Lee Jeong-eun	66-61-68=195	−18
2	(United States) Yealimi Noh	65-68-67=200	−13
3	(New Zealand) Lydia Ko	68-65-68=201	−12
T4	(Thailand) Pajaree Anannarukarn	65-65-72=202	−11
T4	(Japan) Ayaka Furue	66-68-68=202	−11
T4	(Australia) Minjee Lee	68-69-65=202	−11
7	(Thailand) Ariya Jutanugarn	67-63-73=203	−10
T8	(South Korea) Chun In-gee	68-68-68=204	−9
T8	(England) Charley Hull	70-68-66=204	−9
T8	(South Korea) Kim Hyo-joo	67-68-69=204	−9

=== Final round ===
Sunday, 25 July 2021

Minjee Lee came from seven strokes back to tied third round leader Lee Jeong-eun at 266 (−18). At the first hole of the sudden-death playoff, Lee Jeong-eun hit her second shot into the water and ended up making bogey. Minjee Lee made birdie and won her first LPGA major. World number one Nelly Korda finished T-19 and defending champion Ko Jin-young finished T-60.

Place	Player	Score	To par	Prize money (US$)
1	(Australia) Minjee Lee	68-69-65-64=266	−18	675,000
2	(South Korea) Lee Jeong-eun	66-61-68-71=266	−18	414,573
3	(United States) Yealimi Noh	65-68-67-67=267	−17	300,743
4	(Japan) Ayaka Furue	66-68-68-67=269	−15	232,648
5	(Thailand) Atthaya Thitikul	66-69-70-65=270	−14	187,256
T6	(South Korea) Chun In-gee	68-68-68-67=271	−13	123,703
T6	(England) Georgia Hall	69-72-66-64=271	−13	123,703
T6	(New Zealand) Lydia Ko	68-65-68-70=271	−13	123,703
T6	(Republic of Ireland) Leona Maguire	69-70-71-61=271	−13	123,703
T10	(Thailand) Pajaree Anannarukarn	65-65-72-71=273	−11	88,520
T10	(South Korea) Amy Yang	71-69-67-66=273	−11	88,520
