= 2023 International Crown =

Coordinates: 37.724°N 122.493°W

2023 Hanwha LifePlus International Crown
Tournament information
- Dates: May 4–7, 2023
- Location: San Francisco, California, U.S.
- Course: TPC Harding Park
- Organized by: LPGA
- Format: Team – match play

Statistics
- Par: 72
- Length: 5,875 yards (5,372 m)
- Field: 8 nations, 4 players each
- Cut: 4 nations to Sunday bracket
- Prize fund: $1.6 million
- Winner's share: $400,000 team ($100,000 per player)

Champion
- Thailand

Location in the United States

The 2023 Hanwha LifePlus International Crown was a women's golf team event organized by the LPGA, played May 4–7 at TPC Harding Park in San Francisco, California. This was the fourth International Crown, a biennial match play event contested between teams of four players representing eight countries. The winning team earn $500,000, or $125,000 per player.

== Format ==
The competition took place over four days. It featured four-ball competition on Thursday, Friday and Saturday. The top two countries from each pool advanced to Sunday. Two semifinal matches were played Sunday morning. Each semifinal match consisted of two singles matches and one foursomes match. The winning semifinal countries competed in the final match on Sunday afternoon, and a third-place match took place between the two losing semifinal countries. Both matches used the same format as the semifinals.

== Teams ==
On November 21, 2022, immediately following the CME Group Tour Championship, eight teams qualified to participate in this event, based on the combined Women's World Golf Rankings of the top four players from each country: Australia, China, England, Japan, South Korea, Sweden, Thailand, and the United States.

The team members were announced on April 11, 2023, confirmed via the Women's World Golf Rankings as of April 3, and divided into two pools.

Teams
Pool	Seed	Rank	Country
A	1	34	United States
B	2	48	South Korea
B	3	100	Japan
A	4	111	Sweden
A	5	174	England
B	6	213	Thailand
B	7	309	Australia
A	8	481	China

Pool A	Pool B
#1 United States: Rank / Player; 2 / Nelly Korda; 6 / Lexi Thompson; 12 / Lilia Vu; 14 / Danielle Kang	#2 South Korea: Rank / Player; 3 / Ko Jin-young; 9 / Kim Hyo-joo; 11 / Chun In-gee; 25 / Choi Hye-jin
#4 Sweden: Rank / Player; 27 / Maja Stark; 28 / Madelene Sagström; 34 / Anna Nordqvist; 117 / Caroline Hedwall	#3 Japan: Rank / Player; 13 / Nasa Hataoka; 19 / Ayaka Furue; 30 / Yuka Saso; 38 / Hinako Shibuno
#5 England: Rank / Player; 45 / Jodi Ewart Shadoff; 103 / Bronte Law; 165 / Alice Hewson; 207 / Liz Young	#6 Thailand: Rank / Player; 4 / Atthaya Thitikul; 57 / Patty Tavatanakit; 71 / Moriya Jutanugarn; 81 / Ariya Jutanugarn
#8 China: Rank / Player; 17 / Lin Xiyu; 32 / Yin Ruoning; 181 / Yu Liu; 251 / Ruixin Liu	#7 Australia: Rank / Player; 5 / Minjee Lee; 23 / Hannah Green; 107 / Stephanie Kyriacou; 174 / Sarah Kemp

Changes:

- for Sweden, Linn Grant (ranked 22) was unable to participate and was replaced by Caroline Hedwall.
- for England, Georgia Hall (ranked 10) and Charley Hull (ranked 16) withdrew late and were replaced by Alice Hewson and Liz Young.

== Results ==
=== Round one pool play ===
Thursday, May 4, 2023

Pool A

- Sweden vs. England
  - Nordqvist/Hedwall (SWE) defeated Law/Ewart Shadoff (ENG), 4 & 3
  - Sagström/Stark (SWE) defeated Young/Hewson (ENG), 5 & 4
- United States vs. China
  - Vu/Korda (USA) defeated Yin/Lin (CHN), 2 & 1
  - R Liu/L Liu (CHN) defeated Kang/Thompson (USA), 1 up

Standings after round one

Seed	Team	Points	Win	Loss	Tie
4	Sweden	2	2	0	0
1	United States	1	1	1	0
8	China	1	1	1	0
5	England	0	0	2	0

Pool B

- Japan vs. Thailand
  - Thitikul/Tavatanakit (THA) defeated Saso/Furue (JPN), 1 up
  - M Jutanugarn/A Jutanugarn (THA) defeated Hataoka/Shibuno (JPN), 2 up
- South Korea vs. Australia
  - Lee/Kyriacou (AUS) defeated Choi/Chun (KOR), 2 up
  - Green/Kemp (AUS) defeated Kim/Ko (KOR), 2 & 1

Standings after round one

Seed	Team	Points	Win	Loss	Tie
6	Thailand	2	2	0	0
7	Australia	2	2	0	0
2	South Korea	0	0	2	0
3	Japan	0	0	2	0

=== Round two pool play ===
Friday, May 5, 2023

Pool A

- Sweden vs. China
  - Sagström/Stark (SWE) defeated Yin/Lin (CHN), 2 & 1
  - Nordqvist/Hedwall (SWE) defeated R Liu/L Liu (CHN), 2 & 1
- United States vs. England
  - Vu/Korda (USA) defeated Young/Hewson (ENG), 2 & 1
  - Kang/Thompson (USA) defeated Law/Ewart Shadoff (ENG), 3 & 2

Standings after round two

Seed	Team	Points	Win	Loss	Tie
4	Sweden	4	4	0	0
1	United States	3	3	1	0
8	China	1	1	3	0
5	England	0	0	4	0

Pool B

- Japan vs. Australia
  - Lee/Kyriacou (AUS) defeated Hataoka/Furue (JPN), 2 up
  - Green/Kemp (AUS) and Shibuno/Saso (JPN), halved
- Thailand vs. South Korea
  - Thitikul/Tavatanakit (THA) defeated Kim/Ko (KOR), 3 & 2
  - M Jutanugarn/A Jutanugarn (THA) defeated Choi/Chun (KOR), 2 & 1

Standings after round two

Seed	Team	Points	Win	Loss	Tie
6	Thailand	4	4	0	0
7	Australia	3.5	3	0	1
3	Japan	0.5	0	3	1
2	South Korea	0	0	4	0

=== Round three pool play ===
Saturday, May 6, 2023

Pool A

- Sweden vs. United States
  - Nordqvist/Hedwall (SWE) defeated Kang/Thompson (USA), 1 up
  - Vu/Korda (USA) and Sagström/Stark (SWE), halved
- China vs. England
  - Yin/Lin (CHN) defeated Law/Ewart Shadoff (ENG), 2 & 1
  - Young/Hewson (ENG) defeated R Liu/L Liu (CHN), 1 up

Standings after round three

Seed	Team	Points	Win	Loss	Tie
4	Sweden	5.5	5	0	1
1	United States	3.5	3	2	1
8	China	2	2	4	0
5	England	1	1	5	0

Pool B

- Thailand vs. Australia
  - M Jutanugarn/A Jutanugarn (THA) defeated Green/Kemp (AUS), 3 & 2
  - Thitikul/Tavatanakit (THA) defeated Lee/Kyriacou (AUS), 1 up
- Japan vs. South Korea
  - Kim/Ko (KOR) defeated Shibuno/Saso (JPN), 3 & 2
  - Choi/Chun (KOR) defeated Hataoka/Furue (JPN), 2 & 1

Standings after round three

Seed	Team	Points	Win	Loss	Tie
6	Thailand	6	6	0	0
7	Australia	3.5	3	2	1
2	South Korea	2	2	4	0
3	Japan	0.5	0	5	1

=== Finals ===
Sunday, May 7, 2023

Semi-finals

- Sweden vs. Australia
  - Kyriacou (AUS) defeated Nordqvist (SWE), 4 & 3
  - Green (AUS) defeated Hedwall (SWE), 3 & 2
  - Lee/Kemp (AUS) defeated Sagström/Stark (SWE), 5 & 3
- United States vs. Thailand
  - Thitikul (THA) defeated Thompson (USA), 3 & 2
  - Vu (USA) defeated Tavatanakit (THA), 1 up
  - M Jutanugarn/A Jutanugarn (THA) defeated Kang/Korda (USA), 1 up

Semi finals
Sweden	0
Australia	3
United States	1
Thailand	2

Final
Thailand	3
Australia	0
3rd place match
United States	2
Sweden	1

3rd place match

- Sweden vs. United States
  - Sagström (SWE) defeated Vu (USA), 5 & 4
  - Thompson (USA) defeated Stark (SWE), 3 & 2
  - Kang/Korda (USA) defeated Nordqvist/Hedwall (SWE), 1 up

Final

- Thailand vs. Australia
  - Thitikul (THA) defeated Kyriacou (AUS), 4 & 2
  - Tavatanakit (THA) defeated Green (AUS), 4 & 3
  - M Jutanugarn/A Jutanugarn (THA) defeated Lee/Kemp (AUS), 4 & 3

== Final standings ==
Place	Team	Points	Win	Loss	Tie	Money ($) (per player)
1	Thailand	11	11	1	0	125,000
2	Australia	6.5	6	5	1	75,900
3	United States	6.5	6	5	1	64,400
4	Sweden	6.5	6	5	1	55,200
T5	South Korea	2	2	4	0	40,825
T5	China	2	2	4	0	40,825
7	England	1	1	5	0	35,650
8	Japan	0.5	0	5	1	32,200
