= Rose Ladies Series =

Ladies professional golf series

The Rose Ladies Series is a ladies professional golf tour founded in 2020 and organised by Justin Rose and his wife, Kate Rose. The tour was announced following the reintroduction of golf in the United Kingdom after the COVID-19 pandemic lockdowns and while the Ladies European Tour was suspended as a result of the impact of the COVID-19 pandemic on professional golf. The introduction of the series was also heavily influenced by Ladies European Tour member Liz Young.

In its inaugural season, each of the first seven single-round stroke play tournaments and the three-round grand final were played behind closed doors. The tournaments were funded by Justin and Kate Rose with sponsorship being provided by American Golf and Computacenter and the players paying an entry fee to compete in each tournament. The Order of Merit was won by Charley Hull, who overtook Georgia Hall with a runner-up finish in the final event, which was reverted to the scores after 36 holes when play in the final round at Wentworth was abandoned due to a fire on Chobham Common spreading onto the course.

The series returned with an expanded schedule of eleven tournaments in 2021, and again in 2022, with a reduced number of tournaments held earlier in the season as the main tours had returned to normal.

== Television coverage ==
Media coverage of the tournaments was provided by Sky Sports.

== Results ==
=== 2020 season ===
Date(s)	Event	Venue(s)	Winner	Score	Margin of victory	Runner(s)-up	Ref
18 Jun	Event 1	Brokenhurst Manor	(England) Charley Hull (1)	70 (E)	Playoff (Note: Hull won with a birdie on the first hole of a sudden-death playoff.)	(England) Liz Young	
25 Jun	Event 2	Moor Park	(England) Meghan MacLaren (1)	69 (−3)	2 strokes	(England) Samantha Fuller (a) (England) Liz Young	
2 Jul	Event 3	Buckinghamshire	(Scotland) Gemma Dryburgh (1)	69 (−3)	1 stroke	(England) Cara Gainer (England) Georgia Hall	
9 Jul	Event 4	Royal St George's	(Scotland) Gemma Dryburgh (2)	69 (−1)	1 stroke	(England) Georgia Hall (England) Charley Hull	
16 Jul	Event 5	JCB	(England) Gabriella Cowley (1)	70 (−2)	1 stroke	(England) Annabel Dimmock (England) Georgia Hall (Australia) Whitney Hillier (England) Charley Hull (Wales) Chloe Williams	
23 Jul	Event 6	Bearwood Lakes	(England) Georgia Hall (1)	71 (–1)	1 stroke	(England) Cara Gainer (England) Lily May Humphreys (a) (England) Meghan MacLaren (England) Inci Mehmet (England) Mimi Rhodes (a) (England) Emily Slater	
30 Jul	Event 7	The Shire London	(England) Georgia Hall (2)	67 (−5)	3 strokes	(Scotland) Kylie Henry (England) Liz Young	
5–7 Aug	Grand Final	North Hants; The Berkshire; Wentworth	(England) Alice Hewson (1)	137 (−5) (Note: The final round at Wentworth was abandoned due to a fire, and the scores after 36 holes were declared as the final result.)	1 stroke	(England) Charley Hull	

=== 2021 season ===
Date	Event	Venue(s)	Winner	Score	Margin of victory	Runner(s)-up	Ref
29 Apr	Event 1	West Lancs	(England) Gabriella Cowley	71 (−1)	1 stroke	(England) Gemma Clews (England) Michele Thomson	
6 May	Event 2	Woburn (Duchess)	(England) Liz Young	72 (E)	2 strokes	(England) Meghan MacLaren (Wales) Chloe Williams	
13 May	Event 3	Brockenhurst Manor	(Wales) Becky Brewerton	70 (E)	Playoff (Note: Brewerton won on the second hole of a sudden-death playoff.)	(England) Brogan Townend (England) Liz Young	
21 May	Event 4	The Berkshire	(England) Gabriella Cowley	72 (+1)	Playoff (Note: Cowley won on the fourth hole of a sudden-death playoff; Brewerton and Hillier were eliminated on the first extra hole.)	(Wales) Becky Brewerton (England) Alice Hewson (Australia) Whitney Hillier	
2 Aug	Event 5	Hillside	(England) Gemma Clews	67 (−5)	5 strokes	(England) Sarah Gee (England) Lauren Horsford (England) Sophie Stone	
3 Aug	Event 6	Royal Birkdale	(England) Jae Bowers	70 (−4)	Playoff (Note: Bowers won with a birdie on the second hole of a sudden-death playoff.)	(England) Lauren Horsford (Thailand) Chanettee Wannasaen	
5 Aug	Event 7	JCB	(Scotland) Gemma Dryburgh	71 (−1)	Playoff (Note: Dryburgh won with a birdie on the second hole of a sudden-death playoff.)	(Wales) Becky Brewerton	
7 Aug	Event 8	Scotscraig	(United States) Caroline Inglis	66 (−6)	2 strokes	(United States) Andrea Lee	
20 Sep	Event 9	North Hants	(England) Liz Young	68 (−3)	1 stroke	(Scotland) Tara Mactaggart	
23 Sep	Event 10	Buckinghamshire	(England) Gabriella Cowley	68 (−4)	3 strokes	(England) Lauren Horsford (England) Thalia Martin (England) Sophie Stone	
25 Sep	Event 11	Bearwood Lakes	(Wales) Chloe Williams	68 (−4)	2 strokes	(England) Hayley Davis (England) Cloe Frankish	

=== 2022 season ===
Date	Event	Venue(s)	Winner	Score	Margin of victory	Runner(s)-up	Ref
5 Apr	Event 1	West Lancs	(England) Lauren Horsford	74 (+2)	Playoff	(England) Billie-Jo Smith	
14 Apr	Event 2	Sunningdale (New)	(England) Georgina Blackman	70 (E)	Playoff	(England) Inci Mehmet	
20 Apr	Event 3	Brockenhurst Manor	(England) Hayley Davis	66 (−4)	5 strokes	(England) Gabriella Cowley (England) Liz Young	
25 Apr	Event 4	Walton Heath (New)	(England) Rachel Gourley (a)	69 (−4)	2 strokes	(England) Sharna Dutrieux (England) Cara Gainer	
28 Apr	Event 5	Bearwood Lakes	(England) Hayley Davis	72 (E)	1 stroke	(England) Cara Gainer (England) Lauren Horsford	

=== 2024 season ===
Date	Event	Venue(s)	Winner	Score	Margin of victory	Runner(s)-up	Ref
15 Apr	Event 1	West Lancs	Tournament cancelled due to weather				
17 Apr	Event 2	Formby Ladies	(England) Billie-Jo Smith	67 (−4)	1 stroke	(Wales) Amy Boulden	
19 Apr	Event 3	Southport & Ainsdale	(England) Cara Gainer	73 (+1)	1 stroke	(England) Ellie Gower (Wales) Chloe Williams	
22 Apr	Event 4	Sunningdale (New)	(England) Emily Toy	69 (−3)	1 stroke	(England) Cara Gainer	
24 Apr	Event 5	Walton Heath (Old)	(England) Hayley Davis	64 (−8)	3 strokes	(England) Thalia Kirby	

=== 2025 season ===
Date	Event	Venue(s)	Winner	Score	Margin of victory	Runner(s)-up	Ref
28 Apr	Event 1	West Lancs	(Wales) Chloe Williams	68 (−4)	1 stroke	(England) Sarah Gee	
30 Apr	Event 2	Southport & Ainsdale	(Wales) Lydia Hall	66 (−6)	3 strokes	(England) Lily May Humphreys	
2 May	Event 3	Formby Ladies	(England) Meghan MacLaren	67 (−4)	1 stroke	(England) Jae Bowers (Scotland) Louise Duncan (Scotland) Kylie Henry (England) Lily May Humphreys	
6 May	Event 4	St George's Hill	(England) Hayley Davis	69 (−1)	2 stroke	(England) Holly Haslam	
9 May	Event 5	Buckinghamshire	(England) Hannah Screen	72 (E)	1 stroke	(Scotland) Kelsey Macdonald (England) Lauren Horsford	

=== 2026 season ===
Date	Event	Venue(s)	Winner	Score	Margin of victory	Runner(s)-up	Ref
27 Apr	Event 1	West Lancs	(Germany) Laura Fuenfstueck	69 (−3)	Playoff (Note: Fuenfstueck won with birdie on the first extra hole.)	(England) Rebecca Earl (Scotland) Kelsey Macdonald	
29 Apr	Event 2	Southport & Ainsdale	(England) Lauren Crump (a)	70 (−2)	1 stroke	(Germany) Laura Fuenfstueck (England) Jessica Hall	
1 May	Event 3	Formby Ladies	(England) Rebecca Earl	67 (−4)	Playoff (Note: Earl won on the second playoff hole)	(Wales) Becky Morgan	
6 May	Event 4	Buckinghamshire	(England) Charlotte Laffar	69 (−3)	1 stroke	(Germany) Laura Fuenfstueck (Germany) Olivia Cowan	
8 May	Event 5	North Hants	(Germany) Laura Fuenfstueck	68 (−3)	Playoff (Note: Fuenfstueck won on the first playoff hole)	(England) Lily May Humphreys	

== Standings ==
=== 2020 season ===
The table below show the final points standings.

Position	Player	Country	Points
1	Charley Hull	England	576
2	Georgia Hall	England	563
3	Liz Young	England	483
4	Meghan MacLaren	England	383
5	Gabriella Cowley	England	328

== See also ==
- 2020 Ladies European Tour
