= Tvesa Malik =

Indian professional golfer (b0rn 1995)

Personal information
- Nationality: India
- Born: 14 December 1995 (age 30) Gurgaon, Haryana, India

Career
- Sport: Golf
- College: Jesus and Mary College
- Turned professional: 2017
- Current tours: Ladies European Tour (joined 2019); Hero Women's Pro Golf Tour (joined 2017); Sunshine Ladies Tour
- Professional wins: 14

Best results in LPGA major championships
- Chevron Championship: DNP
- Women's PGA C'ship: DNP
- U.S. Women's Open: DNP
- Women's British Open: CUT: 2020
- Evian Championship: DNP

Achievements and awards
- Hero Women's Pro Golf Tour Order of Merit: 2018

Tvesa Malik (born 14 December 1995) is an Indian professional golfer from Bengaluru. She plays on the Ladies European Tour and was runner-up at the 2021 Gant Ladies Open in Finland and the 2024 VP Bank Swiss Ladies Open. She won the 2024 SuperSport Ladies Challenge in South Africa.

== Amateur career ==
Tvesa was one of the leading Indian amateurs, and became part of the national squad in 2014. She won an event on the domestic Hero Women's Pro Golf Tour in 2015, while still an amateur.

Tvesa represented India at the World Amateur Team Championship for the 2016 Espirito Santo Trophy, and at the 2016 and 2017 Queen Sirikit Cup, alongside Diksha Dagar.

== Professional career ==
Tvesa turned professional in 2017 and joined the Hero Women's Pro Golf Tour. She won twice and tied for third on the Order of Merit as a rookie. In 2018, she won four times and topped the Order of Merit, and also tied for 13th in the Hero Women's Indian Open. In 2019, she won three times in seven starts.

Tvesa joined the Ladies European Tour in 2019 after finishing 45th at Q-School. In her rookie year, she played in 12 tournaments and made eight cuts, recording a season-best finish of tied 6th in the Hero Women's Indian Open at DLF Golf and Country Club, her home course. She finished 45th in the Order of Merit to retain her full card for 2020.

In 2020, she was in contention at the Lacoste Ladies Open de France, where she tied for 10th having played in the final group alongside the eventual winner, Julia Engström. She finished 56th on the Order of Merit.

In 2021, Tvesa was runner-up at the Gant Ladies Open in Finland, 3 strokes behind Matilda Castren.

In 2024, Tvesa won her maiden international title at the SuperSport Ladies Challenge in South Africa, before losing a playoff at the VP Bank Swiss Ladies Open to Alice Hewson.

== Personal life ==
Tvesa is married to Indian professional golfer Ajeetesh Sandhu.

== Amateur wins ==
- 2016 Northern India Ladies & Girls, Gujarat Ladies & Junior Girls Championship

== Professional wins (14) ==
=== Sunshine Ladies Tour (1) ===
No.	Date	Tournament	Winning score	To par	Margin of victory	Runner-up
1	23 Feb 2024	SuperSport Ladies Challenge	71-65-71=207	−9	3 strokes	(South Africa) Gabrielle Venter

=== Hero Women's Pro Golf Tour (13) ===
- 2015 (1) Hero Women's Pro Golf Tour #16 (as an amateur)
- 2017 (2) Hero Women's Pro Golf Tour #7, Hero Women's Pro Golf Tour #12
- 2018 (4) Hero Women's Pro Golf Tour #4, Hero Women's Pro Golf Tour #12, Hero Women's Pro Golf Tour #15, Hero Women's Pro Golf Tour #16
- 2019 (3) Hero Women's Pro Golf Tour #3, Hero Women's Pro Golf Tour #8, Hero Women's Pro Golf Tour #13
- 2021 (1) Hero Women's Pro Golf Tour #6
- 2023 (2) Hero Women's Pro Golf Tour #11, Hero Women's Pro Golf Tour #13

== Playoff record ==
Ladies European Tour playoff record (0–1)

No.	Year	Tournament	Opponent	Result
1	2024	VP Bank Swiss Ladies Open	(England) Alice Hewson	Lost to birdie on first extra hole

== Team appearances ==
- Espirito Santo Trophy (representing India): 2016
- Queen Sirikit Cup (representing India): 2016, 2017
