= Travis Pointe Country Club =

Country club

- Location within the United States Location within Michigan
- 42.215°N 83.785°W

Club information
- Location: Ann Arbor, Michigan
- Elevation: 850 feet (260 m)
- Established: 1977; 49 years ago
- Type: Private
- Tota holes: 18
- Tournaments: LPGA Volvik Championship (2016–present)
- Website: travispointe.com
- Designed by: Bill Newcomb
- Par: 72
- Length: 7,326 yards (6,699 m)
- Course rating: 76.0
- Slope rating: 139

Travis Pointe Country Club is a private country club and golf course in the central United States, located in Ann Arbor, Michigan. Founded 49 years ago in 1977, the par-72 golf course has six sets of tees and measures 7,326 yards (6,699 m) from the back tees.

It has hosted the LPGA Volvik Championship on the LPGA Tour since its debut in 2016.

== Course ==
Hole	Yards	Par	Hole	Yards	Par
1	464	4	10	423	4
2	432	4	11	386	4
3	168	3	12	228	3
4	588	5	13	392	4
5	437	4	14	511	5
6	545	5	15	408	4
7	221	3	16	215	3
8	409	4	17	453	4
9	452	4	18	594	5
Out	3,716	36	In	3,610	36
Source:			Total	7,326	72
