= Gabriella Cowley =

English professional golfer

Personal information
- Nickname: Gabs
- Nationality: England
- Born: 10 March 1996 (age 30) London, England
- Height: 5 ft 11 in (1.80 m)

Career
- Sport: Golf
- Turned professional: 2014
- Current tour: Ladies European Tour (joined 2016)
- Former tour: LET Access Series (joined 2015)
- Professional wins: 4

Best results in LPGA major championships
- Chevron Championship: DNP
- Women's PGA C'ship: DNP
- U.S. Women's Open: DNP
- Women's British Open: T60: 2024
- Evian Championship: DNP

Gabriella Cowley (born 10 March 1996) is an English professional golfer and Ladies European Tour player. She was runner-up at the 2021 Ladies Italian Open and the 2023 ISPS Handa World Invitational, an event co-sanctioned by the LPGA Tour.

== Amateur career ==
Cowley, with home club West Essex Golf Club and later Hanbury Manor, only started playing golf at the age of 13 but was soon a member of the England Golf National Girl's squad, and represented England at the Girls Home Internationals, Women's Home Internationals and the European Girls' Team Championship. At the 2014 European Ladies' Team Championship at Linköping Golf Club, her team finished fourth after losing the semi-final to France.

She also played in the 2014 Espirito Santo Trophy together with Hayley Davis and Bronte Law, finishing tied 8th, and represented and Great Britain and Ireland against Europe in the 2013 Vagliano Trophy and against the United States in the 2014 Curtis Cup.

Individually, she won the 2011 English Girls Under 15 Championship and the 2012 North of England Under 16 Stroke Play Championship. She finished 5th at the 2013 Australian Youth Olympic Festival and was runner-up at the 2014 Portuguese International Ladies Amateur Championship, a stroke behind Silvia Banon Ibanez.

She made her major debut at the 2013 Women's British Open held at the Old Course at St Andrews, where she did not make the cut.

== Professional career ==
Cowley turned professional in October 2014 and joined the LET Access Series in 2015, where she only made two cuts her first season. In 2016, her rookie season on the LET, she made three cuts in four starts and finished 16th in the Rookie of the Year ranking. In 2019, she recorded her first top-10 finish at the Omega Dubai Moonlight Classic.

During the COVID-19 pandemic, Cowley participated in the Rose Ladies Series in England where she recorded four wins. Returning to play in Europe, she was runner-up 2021 Ladies Italian Open, a stroke behind Lucie Malchirand, and finished the season 33rd in the Race to Costa Del Sol.

In 2022, she was the next best-placed female at the Scandinavian Mixed, a joint European Tour and LET event, 14 strokes behind winner Linn Grant. She also finished in a tie for 8th at the KPMG Women's Irish Open and ended the season 24th in the rankings.

In 2023, she was on the Casandra Alexander team that finished runner-up at the Aramco Team Series – Florida in May. In August, she lost a playoff to Alexa Pano at the ISPS Handa World Invitational, an event co-sanctioned by the LPGA Tour.

== Amateur wins ==
- 2011 English Girls Under 15 Championship
- 2012 North of England Under 16 Stroke Play Championship

== Professional wins (4) ==
=== Rose Ladies Series wins (4) ===
- 2020 Rose Ladies Series at JCB
- 2021 Rose Ladies Series at West Lancs, Rose Ladies Series at The Berkshire, Rose Ladies Series at Buckinghamshire

== Playoff record ==
LPGA Tour playoff record (0–1)

No.	Year	Tournament	Opponents	Result
1	2023	ISPS Handa World Invitational^	(United States) Alexa Pano (Germany) Esther Henseleit	Pano won with birdie on third extra hole, Henseleit eliminated with birdie on first extra hole.

^ Co-sanctioned by the Ladies European Tour

== Results in LPGA majors ==
Cowley only played in the Women's British Open.

! Tournament	2013	2014	2015	2016	2017	2018	2019	2020	2021	2022	2023	2024
Women's British Open	CUT						CUT		CUT			T60

Did not play

CUT = missed the half-way cut

== Team appearances ==
Amateur

- Girls Home Internationals (representing England): 2012 (winners), 2013 (winners)
- Women's Home Internationals (representing England): 2012 (winners), 2013, 2014 (winners)
- Vagliano Trophy (representing Great Britain and Ireland): 2013
- European Girls' Team Championship (representing England): 2013
- European Ladies' Team Championship (representing England): 2014
- Espirito Santo Trophy (representing England): 2014
- Curtis Cup (representing Great Britain and Ireland): 2014
