= LPGA Volvik Championship =

Golf tournament

Coordinates: 42.215°N 83.785°W

Tournament information
- Location: Ann Arbor, Michigan, U.S.
- Established: 2016
- Course: Travis Pointe Country Club
- Par: 72
- Length: 6,709 yards (6,135 m)
- Tour: LPGA Tour
- Format: Stroke play – 72 holes
- Prize fund: $1.3 million
- Month played: May
- Final year: 2018

Tournament record score
- Aggregate: 269 Shanshan Feng (2017)
- To par: −19 as above

Final champion
- (Australia) Minjee Lee

Location in the United States
Location in Michigan

The LPGA Volvik Championship was a women's professional golf tournament on the LPGA Tour. A new event in 2016, it was played in Michigan at Travis Pointe Country Club, southwest of Ann Arbor.

Volvik is a manufacturer of colored golf balls, headquartered in South Korea.

== Course layout ==
Travis Pointe Country Club

Hole	Yards	Par	Hole	Yards	Par
1	391	4	10	394	4
2	411	4	11	387	4
3	166	3	12	184	3
4	533	5	13	359	4
5	403	4	14	462	5
6	481	5	15	410	4
7	204	3	16	180	3
8	378	4	17	415	4
9	403	4	18	548	5
Out	3,370	36	In	3,339	36
Source:			Total	6,709	72

== Winners ==
Year	Dates	Champion	Country	Winning score	To par	Margin of victory	Purse ($)	Winner's share ($)
2018	May 24–27	Minjee Lee	Australia	67-69-68-68=272	−16	1 stroke	1,300,000	195,000
2017	May 25–28	Shanshan Feng	China	68-67-66-68=269	−19	1 stroke	1,300,000	195,000
2016	May 26–29	Ariya Jutanugarn	Thailand	65-68-73-67=273	−15	5 strokes	1,300,000	195,000

== Tournament records ==
Year	Player	Score	Round
2016	Christina Kim	64 (−8)	1st
