= Greg Norman Medal =

Australian golf award

Greg Norman Medal is awarded annually to best male or female professional Australian golfer on the world stage. The award was established in 2015 by the Professional Golfer's Association of Australia (PGA) with the support of the Australian Ladies Professional Golf (ALPG).

In naming the award after Greg Norman, the PGA stated that "Not only was he number one for 331 weeks, a two time major winner and a winner 20 times on the PGA Tour, he also won 31 times on our own PGA Tour of Australasia and put Australian Golf on the world map. He has been a staunch supporter of the PGA of Australia and local golf for many years."

The award is judged by a five-member panel of current or former male and female professional golfers and based on annual success on the Australian and international stage including all professional tours: women – LPGA Tour, ALPG Tour and Ladies European Tour and men – PGA Tour, PGA Tour of Australasia, European Tour, Asian Tour and the Japan Golf Tour.

== Winners ==
Year	Winner
2015	Jason Day
2016	Jason Day (2)
2017	Marc Leishman
2018	Minjee Lee
2019	Hannah Green
2020	Cameron Smith
2021	Minjee Lee (2)
2022	Cameron Smith (2)
2023	Minjee Lee (3)
2024	Hannah Green (2)
2025	Minjee Lee
