= 2023 Solheim Cup =

Women's team golf competition

- Dates: 22–24 September 2023
- Venue: Finca Cortesin
- Location: Casares, Málaga, Andalusia, Spain
- Captains: Suzann Pettersen (Europe); Stacy Lewis (USA)
(Europe)	14	14	(United States)
- Europe retains the Solheim Cup

Location map
- Location in Europe Location in Spain Location in Andalusia

The 2023 Solheim Cup was the 18th edition of the Solheim Cup matches, held 22–24 September in southern Spain at the Finca Cortesin in Casares, Andalusia. The Solheim Cup is a biennial team competition between the top women professional golfers from Europe and the United States. Stacy Lewis captained the U.S. team for the first time and Suzann Pettersen captained the European team for the first time. The par-72 course was set at 6,312 metres (6,903 yd).

The previous competition in 2021 was won by Europe, 15 points to 13. The 2023 competition resulted in a draw, with each team scoring 14 points. As the Cup can only change hands on a victory by either side, Europe retained it.

The Solheim Cup returned to even-numbered years in 2024, the first time since 2002; the Ryder Cup returned to an odd-year schedule after the 2020 competition was postponed due to the COVID-19 pandemic.

== Format ==
The competition was a three-day match play event between teams of 12 players with a similar format to the Ryder Cup, with each match worth one point. The format is as follows:

- Day 1 (Friday): Four foursomes (alternate shot) matches in a morning session and four fourball (better ball) matches in an afternoon session. A total of eight players from each team participate in each session.
- Day 2 (Saturday): Four foursomes matches in a morning session and four fourball matches in an afternoon session. A total of eight players from each team participate in each session.
- Day 3 (Sunday): 12 singles matches. All 12 players from each team participate.

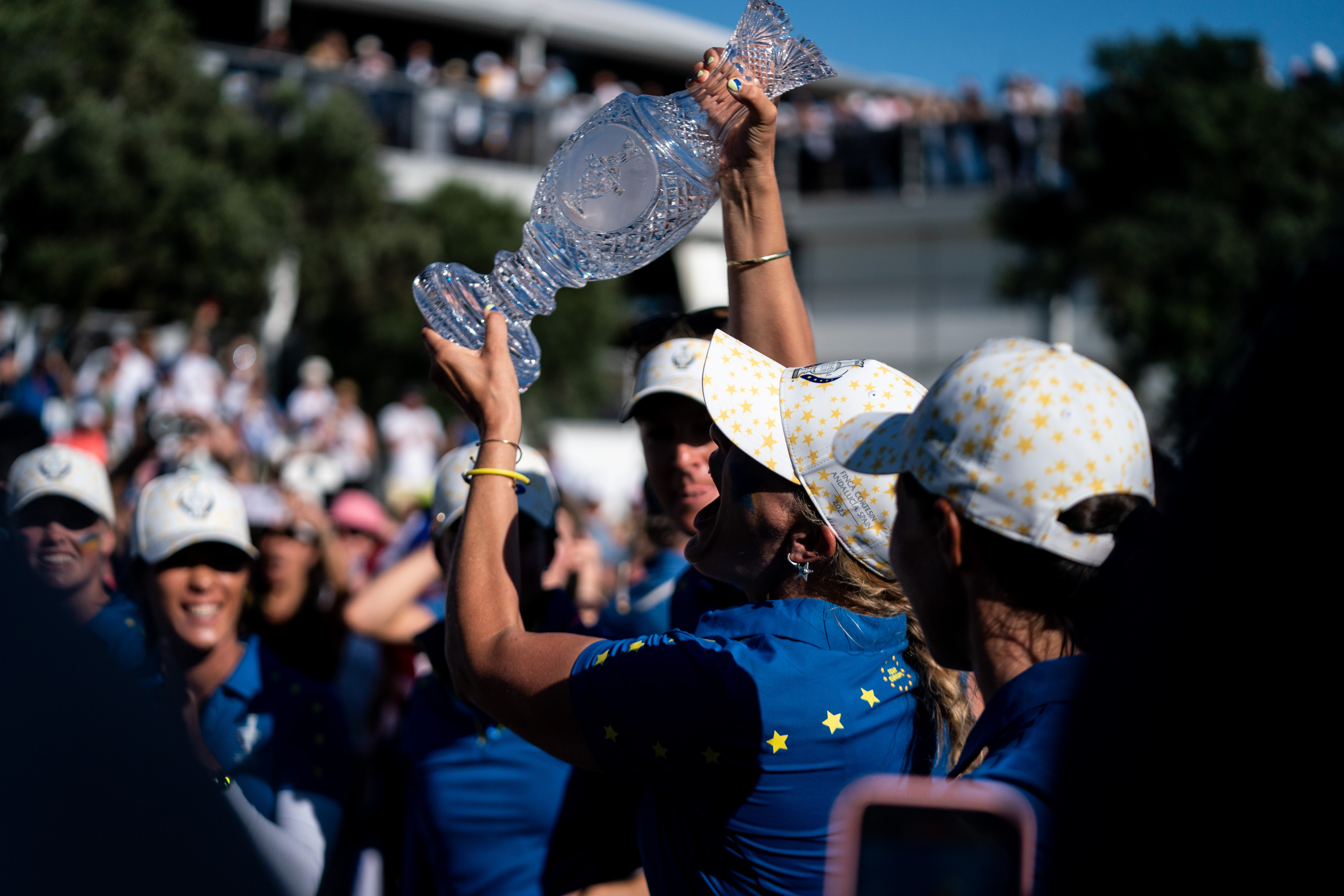
Team Europe celebrating with the Solheim Cup trophy after retaining it.

With a total of 28 points, 14 1/2 points are required to win the Cup, and 14 points are required for the defending champion to retain the Cup. All matches are played to a maximum of 18 holes. If the score is even after 18 holes, each team earns one-half point.

== Team qualification and selection ==
=== Team Europe ===
In order to be eligible to be a member of the European team, players were required to:

- be current members of the Ladies European Tour in any category or membership;
- have played in eight Ranking Events (excluding the Excluded Championships) during the Qualifying Period as a member of the LET, unless the relevant player has been selected by the appointed captain for the 2023 European Team;
- be a "European national". To be a "European national", the player must satisfy the criteria set out in the "Nationality Policy" issued by the International Golf Federation.

Team Europe was made up of eight automatic qualifiers – the top two players from the LET Solheim Cup standings, followed by the top six LET members on the Women's World Golf Rankings who were not already qualified via the Solheim Cup standings – and four captain's selections.

=== Team USA ===
In order to be eligible to be a member of the United States team, players were required to be current members of the LPGA Tour and meet one of these three citizenship criteria:

- U.S. citizens by birth, regardless of their birthplace.
- Those who were naturalized as U.S. citizens before age 18.
- Those who became U.S. citizens by adoption before age 13.

Team USA was made up of nine automatic qualifiers – the leading seven players from the LPGA Solheim Cup points rankings and the top two players in the Women's World Golf Rankings not already qualified via the points rankings – and three chosen by the team captain. LPGA Solheim Cup points were earned for top-20 finishes on the LPGA Tour over a two-year period.

== Teams ==
Coaching staff: captain – Suzann Pettersen, vice-captains – Laura Davies, Caroline Martens, Anna Nordqvist (playing vice-captain).

Team Europe
Player	Country	Age	Points rank	Rolex ranking	Previous appearances	Matches	W–L–H	Winning percentage
Céline Boutier	France	29	1	3	2	7	5–1–1	78.57%
Maja Stark	Sweden	23	2	40	0	Rookie		
Linn Grant	Sweden	24	3	19	0	Rookie		
Charley Hull	England	27	4	9	5	19	11–5–3	65.79%
Carlota Ciganda	Spain	33	5	33	5	19	7–8–4	47.37%
Georgia Hall	England	27	8	16	3	13	7–5–1	57.69%
Anna Nordqvist	Sweden	36	10	37	7	27	14–10–3	57.41%
Leona Maguire	Ireland	28	13	14	1	5	4–0–1	90.00%
Caroline Hedwall (P)	Sweden	34	17	120	4	15	8–6–1	56.67%
Madelene Sagström (P)	Sweden	30	28	42	2	6	2–4–0	33.33%
Gemma Dryburgh (P)	Scotland	30	42	48	0	Rookie		
Emily Kristine Pedersen (P)	Denmark	27	48	114	2	7	3–4–0	42.86%

Coaching staff: captain – Stacy Lewis, assistant captains – Morgan Pressel, Natalie Gulbis, Angela Stanford

Team USA
Player	Age	Points rank	Rolex ranking	Previous appearances	Matches	W–L–H	Winning percentage
Lilia Vu	25	1	1	0	Rookie		
Nelly Korda	25	2	2	2	8	5–2–1	68.75%
Allisen Corpuz	25	3	8	0	Rookie		
Megan Khang	25	4	13	2	6	1–3–2	33.33%
Jennifer Kupcho	26	5	28	1	4	2–1–1	62.50%
Danielle Kang	30	6	31	3	12	5–7–0	41.67%
Andrea Lee	25	7	43	0	Rookie		
Lexi Thompson	28	8	26	5	19	6–6–7	50.00%
Rose Zhang	20	17	30	0	Rookie		
Ally Ewing (P)	30	9	33	2	8	2–5–1	31.25%
Cheyenne Knight (P)	26	11	46	0	Rookie		
Angel Yin (P)	24	12	32	2	6	3–2–1	58.33%

Ages on first day of matches, 22 September; Rolex rankings at team selection. Captain's picks (P) shown in yellow.

== Day one ==
Friday, 22 September 2023

=== Morning foursomes ===
	Results
Stark/Grant	(United States) 2 & 1	Thompson/Khang
Boutier/Hall	(United States) 1 up	Kang/Lee
Maguire/Nordqvist	(United States) 1 up	Korda/Corpuz
Hull/Pedersen	(United States) 5 & 4	Ewing/Knight
0	Session	4
0	Overall	4

For the first time in Solheim Cup history, Team USA swept a foursomes session.

=== Afternoon four-ball ===
	Results
Dryburgh/Sagström	halved	Zhang/Khang
Maguire/Hall	(Europe) 1 up	Thompson/Vu
Pedersen/Stark	halved	Kupcho/Corpuz
Ciganda/Grant	(Europe) 4 & 2	Yin/Ewing
3	Session	1
3	Overall	5

Emily Kristine Pedersen made the second hole-in-one in Solheim Cup history on the 12th hole in the afternoon four-ball.

== Day two ==
Saturday, 23 September 2023

=== Morning foursomes ===
	Results
Pedersen/Ciganda	(Europe) 2 & 1	Vu/Kupcho
Maguire/Nordqvist	(United States) 1 up	Thompson/Khang
Boutier/Hall	(United States) 5 & 3	Korda/Corpuz
Stark/Grant	(Europe) 1 up	Kang/Lee
2	Session	2
5	Overall	7

=== Afternoon four-ball ===
	Results
Hull/Maguire	(Europe) 4 & 3	Korda/Ewing
Nordqvist/Hedwall	(United States) 2 up	Knight/Yin
Sagström/Pedersen	(Europe) 2 & 1	Zhang/Lee
Ciganda/Grant	(Europe) 2 & 1	Kang/Vu
3	Session	1
8	Overall	8

== Day three ==
Sunday, 24 September 2023

=== Singles ===
	Results
Linn Grant	(United States) 1 up	Megan Khang
Leona Maguire	(Europe) 4 & 3	Rose Zhang
Charley Hull	(United States) 4 & 2	Danielle Kang
Anna Nordqvist	(Europe) 2 & 1	Jennifer Kupcho
Georgia Hall	halved	Andrea Lee
Gemma Dryburgh	halved	Cheyenne Knight
Céline Boutier	(United States) 2 & 1	Angel Yin
Caroline Hedwall	(Europe) 2 up	Ally Ewing
Madelene Sagström	(United States) 4 & 3	Lilia Vu
Maja Stark	(Europe) 2 & 1	Allisen Corpuz
Carlota Ciganda	(Europe) 2 & 1	Nelly Korda
Emily Kristine Pedersen	(United States) 2 & 1	Lexi Thompson
6	Session	6
14	Overall	14

== Individual player records ==
Each entry refers to the win–loss–half record of the player.

=== Europe ===
Player	Points	Overall	Singles	Foursomes	Fourballs
Céline Boutier	0	0–3–0	0–1-0	0–2–0	0–0–0
Carlota Ciganda	4	4–0–0	1–0–0	1–0–0	2–0–0
Gemma Dryburgh	1	0–0–2	0–0–1	0–0–0	0–0–1
Linn Grant	3	3–2–0	0–1–0	1–1–0	2–0–0
Georgia Hall	1.5	1–2–1	0–0–1	0–2–0	1–0–0
Caroline Hedwall	1	1–1–0	1–0–0	0–0–0	0–1–0
Charley Hull	1	1–2–0	0–1–0	0–1–0	1–0–0
Leona Maguire	3	3–2–0	1–0–0	0–2–0	2–0–0
Anna Nordqvist	1	1–3–0	1–0–0	0–2–0	0–1–0
Emily Kristine Pedersen	2.5	2–2–1	0–1–0	1–1–0	1–0–1
Madelene Sagström	1.5	1–1–1	0–1–0	0–0–0	1–0–1
Maja Stark	2.5	2–1–1	1–0–0	1–1–0	0–0–1

=== United States ===
Player	Points	Overall	Singles	Foursomes	Fourballs
Allisen Corpuz	2.5	2–1–1	0–1–0	2–0–0	0–0–1
Ally Ewing	1	1–3–0	0–1–0	1–0–0	0–2–0
Danielle Kang	2	2–2–0	1–0–0	1–1–0	0–1–0
Megan Khang	3.5	3–0–1	1–0–0	2–0–0	0–0–1
Cheyenne Knight	2.5	2–0–1	0–0–1	1–0–0	1–0–0
Nelly Korda	2	2–2–0	0–1–0	2–0–0	0–1–0
Jennifer Kupcho	0.5	0–2–1	0–1–0	0–1–0	0–0–1
Andrea Lee	1.5	1–2–1	0–0–1	1–1–0	0–1–0
Lexi Thompson	3	3–1–0	1–0–0	2–0–0	0–1–0
Lilia Vu	1	1–3–0	1–0–0	0–1–0	0–2–0
Angel Yin	2	2–1–0	1–0–0	0–0–0	1–1–0
Rose Zhang	0.5	0–2–1	0–1–0	0–0–0	0–1–1
