= 2014 Curtis Cup =

Golf competition in Ladue, Missouri

Coordinates: 38.651°N 90.377°W

38th Curtis Cup Match
- Dates: June 6–8, 2014
- Venue: St. Louis Country Club
- Location: Ladue, Missouri
- Captains: Ellen Port (USA); Tegwen Matthews (GB&I)
(United States)	13	7	(United Kingdom) (Republic of Ireland)
- United States wins the Curtis Cup

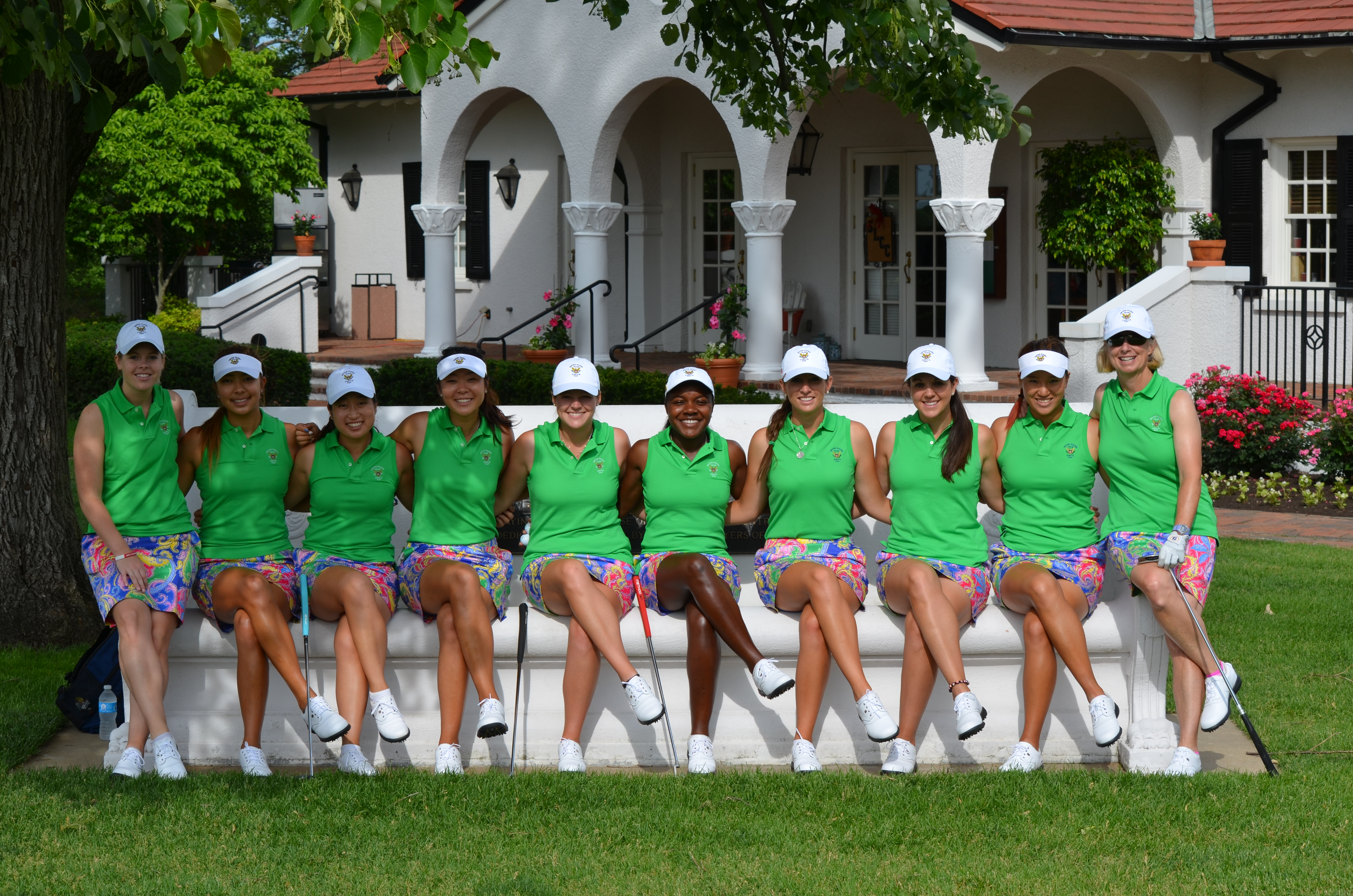
The winning team

The 38th Curtis Cup Match was played from June 6 to 8, 2014 at St. Louis Country Club in Ladue, Missouri. The United States won 13 to 7.

== Format ==
The contest was a three-day competition, with three fourball and three foursomes matches on each of the first two days, and eight singles matches on the final day, a total of 20 points.

Each of the 20 matches is worth one point in the larger team competition. If a match is all square after the 18th hole extra holes are not played. Rather, each side earns 1/2 a point toward their team total. The team that accumulates at least 10 1/2 points wins the competition. In the event of a tie, the current holder retains the Cup.

== Teams ==
Eight players for the USA and Great Britain & Ireland participated in the event plus one non-playing captain for each team.

The American team was selected by the USGA’s International Team Selection Committee.

Team USA
Name	Age	Notes
Ellen Port	52	non-playing captain
Kyung Kim	20
Alison Lee	19
Erynne Lee	21
Ally McDonald	21
Annie Park	19
Ashlan Ramsey	18
Mariah Stackhouse	20
Emma Talley	20

Six members of the Great Britain & Ireland team were selected automatically, the top four in the World Amateur Golf Ranking (WAGR) as of May 5, 2014 and the leading two players in the LGU’s Order of Merit not selected from the WAGR. The remaining two were picked by the LGU Selection Panel.

& Great Britain & Ireland
Name	Age	Notes
(Wales) Tegwen Matthews	58	non-playing captain
(Scotland) Eilidh Briggs	21	LGU Order of Merit
(England) Gabriella Cowley	18	LGU Order of Merit
(England) Annabel Dimmock	17	WAGR
(Scotland) Gemma Dryburgh	20	Selection Panel Pick
(England) Georgia Hall	18	WAGR
(England) Bronte Law	19	WAGR, played in 2012
(Northern Ireland) Stephanie Meadow	22	WAGR, played in 2012
(England) Charlotte Thomas	21	Selection Panel Pick

== Friday's matches ==
=== Morning fourballs ===
&	Results
Meadow/Hall	(United States) 2 & 1	Stackhouse/Talley
Dimmock/Dryburgh	(United States) 4 & 3	A. Lee/Kim
Law/Thomas	(United States) 4 & 3	Park/McDonald
0	Session	3
0	Overall	3

=== Afternoon foursomes ===
&	Results
Meadow/Hall	halved	Ramsey/A. Lee
Briggs/Cowley	(United States) 3 & 1	E. Lee/Park
Dimmock/Law	halved	Talley/McDonald
1	Session	2
1	Overall	5

== Saturday's matches ==
=== Morning fourballs ===
&	Results
Meadow/Hall	(United States) 4 & 2	Kim/A. Lee
Dimmock/Law	(United Kingdom) (Republic of Ireland) 1 up	E. Lee/Park
Cowley/Dryburgh	(United States) 2 & 1	Talley/Stackhouse
1	Session	2
2	Overall	7

=== Afternoon foursomes ===
&	Results
Thomas/Dryburgh	(United States) 2 & 1	Ramsey/A. Lee
Briggs/Cowley	(United States) 3 & 2	Kim/E. Lee
Meadow/Hall	halved	McDonald/Stackhouse
1/2	Session	2 1/2
2 1/2	Overall	9 1/2

== Sunday's singles matches ==
&	Results
Bronte Law	(United States) 4 & 3	Emma Talley
Annabel Dimmock	(United States) 4 & 3	Ally McDonald
Georgia Hall	(United Kingdom) (Republic of Ireland) 3 & 2	Kyung Kim
Gemma Dryburgh	(United Kingdom) (Republic of Ireland) 1 up	Ashlan Ramsey
Charlotte Thomas	(United Kingdom) (Republic of Ireland) 2 up	Erynne Lee
Eilidh Briggs	halved	Mariah Stackhouse
Gabriella Cowley	(United States) 5 & 4	Annie Park
Stephanie Meadow	(United Kingdom) (Republic of Ireland) 2 & 1	Alison Lee
4 1/2	Session	3 1/2
7	Overall	13
