= Georgia Hall =

English professional golfer (born 1996)

Georgia Hall MBE
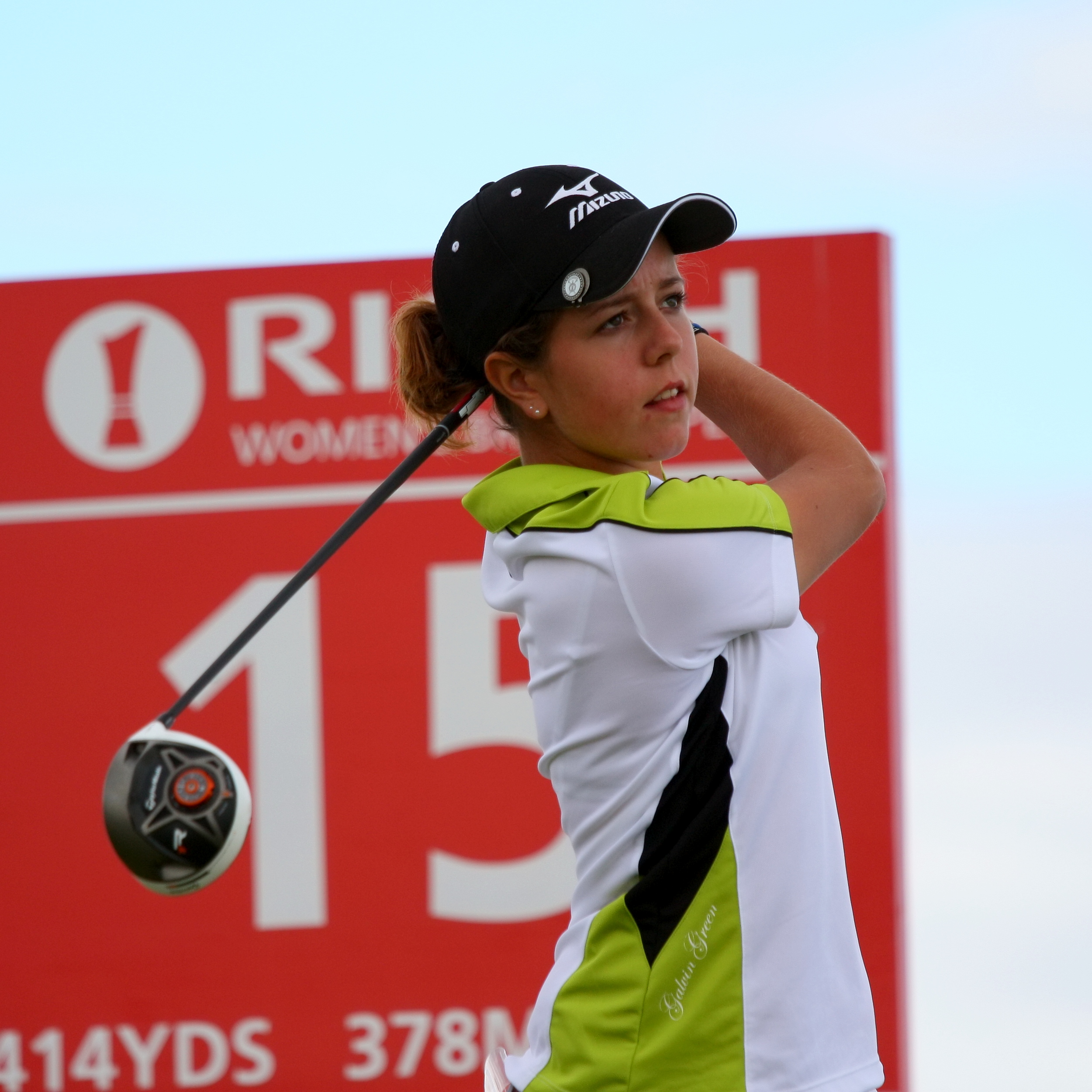
- Hall at the 2013 Women's British Open

Personal information
- Full name: Georgia Kelly Hall
- Nationality: England
- Born: 12 April 1996 (age 30) Bournemouth, England

Career
- Sport: Golf
- Turned professional: 2014
- Current tours: Ladies European Tour; LPGA Tour
- Professional wins: 7

Number of wins by tour
- LPGA Tour: 2
- Ladies European Tour: 2
- WPGA Tour of Australasia: 1
- Other: 3

Best results in LPGA major championships (wins: 1)
- Chevron Championship: T12: 2023
- Women's PGA C'ship: T21: 2021, 2022
- U.S. Women's Open: T34: 2018, 2022
- Women's British Open: Won: 2018
- Evian Championship: T6: 2021

Achievements and awards
- Ladies European Tour Order of Merit: 2017, 2018
- Ladies European Tour Player of the Year: 2017, 2018

Georgia Kelly Hall (born 12 April 1996) is an English professional golfer. She plays on the Ladies European Tour and the LPGA Tour. She has won one major, the 2018 Women's British Open.

Hall won the British Ladies Amateur Golf Championship in 2013 and competed in both the Junior Solheim Cup and the Curtis Cup before turning professional in 2014. She won her first professional title at the 2014 Open Generali de Strasbourg and made her Solheim Cup debut in 2017. Hall topped the Ladies European Tour Order of Merit in both 2017 and 2018, and in the latter she claimed her first major at the Women's British Open. She won her second LPGA title at the Cambia Portland Classic in 2020 and her second title on the Ladies European Tour at the Saudi Ladies International in 2022.

Hall has won seven professional titles, including two on the LPGA Tour. She has six top-10 finishes in majors, three at the Women's British Open, and three at the Evian Championship. She has competed in five Solheim Cups, winning two, and has a career high year-end ranking of eighth.

== Amateur career ==
Hall began playing golf aged seven at Canford Magna Golf Club in Dorset, when she accompanied her father Wayne to the driving range. She entered children's competitions there, where she competed for chocolate bars. In 2009, Hall was crowned English girls under-13 champion, and the following year she won the English girls under-15 title. She represented England in the 2011 European Girls' Team Championship, where she helped England win the silver medal. Hall then achieved victory at the 2012 Girls Amateur Championship and was subsequently nominated for the BBC Young Sports Personality of the Year award the same year. She followed this with two gold medals at the 2013 Australian Youth Olympic Festival, where she was the flag bearer for the British team in the opening ceremony. Hall was then victorious at the 2013 British Ladies Amateur Golf Championship.

Hall became the European number one ranked amateur, and she was invited to play at the 2013 Kraft Nabisco Championship, her first ever appearance at a major, where she missed the cut. She then turned down the chance to enter the 2013 U.S. Women's Open, in order to compete for Great Britain and Ireland in the Vagliano Trophy in France. There, Great Britain and Ireland were defeated 7.5–16.5 by Europe. She then competed in the 2013 Women's British Open at St Andrews, where she finished as the leading amateur. Around this time, Hall left her studies at Oakmead College to concentrate on her golf career, and in July 2013, she was selected to play in the Junior Solheim Cup the following month in Colorado, USA.

In June 2014, Hall competed in the Curtis Cup for Great Britain and Ireland. She won her singles match against Kyung Kim 3 and 2, but USA won the event 13–7 at St Louis Country Club, Missouri. She then competed in the 2014 Women's British Open at Royal Birkdale and finished T29th. She was unable to collect what would have been around €18,000 in prize money due to her amateur status. After the event, Hall decided to turn professional, saying: "I've won a few amateur competitions and I don't think there is a lot of point in playing those again, but it has been an amazing experience and I will never forget it."

== Professional career ==
=== 2014–2019 ===
Hall turned professional in July 2014, and finished third in her first tournament as a professional at the Ingarö Ladies Open in Stockholm, Sweden. Hall won her first professional title in September at the Open Generali de Strasbourg on the LET Access Series, which she won by four strokes. She hit a hole-in-one at the Dubai Ladies Masters in December, with her feat earning her a £50,000 Mercedes. The following week, Hall entered the Laila Aicha Tour School in Morocco to try and earn a tour card for the Ladies European Tour. She finished second in the event and thus won her tour card for the following year.

In 2015, Hall recorded six top-20 finishes on the Ladies European Tour and made 11 out of 12 cuts. She also made her debut in the U.S. Women's Open, arriving as a late reserve having originally failed to qualify. The tournament also marked her first start in a major as a professional. At the tournament, Hall missed the cut by ten strokes at Lancaster Country Club, Pennsylvania, after shooting 14-over-par. In December, she ended her season with a tied-12th finish at the Dubai Ladies Masters.

In February 2016, Hall won the Oates Victorian Open on the ALPG Tour at Barwon Heads, Victoria. She missed the cut in the 2016 Women's British Open at Woburn, but finished runner-up at the Fatima Bint Mubarak Ladies Open in November to Beth Allen. Hall shot an eight-under-par 64 during her second round there to equal the course record in Abu Dhabi, but finished the tournament three shots adrift. She concluded her year with five top-10 finishes in succession on the Ladies European Tour with a tied-5th finish at the Dubai Ladies Masters in the final event of the year. She ended 2016 at 108 in the world rankings.

In March 2017, Hall finished tied-3rd at the World Ladies Championship in Haikou, China. She entered the Women's PGA Championship and finished tied-46th. She then finished tied-8th at the Thornberry Creek LPGA Classic and T51st at the U.S. Women's Open. Hall then made her debut for the European team in the 2017 Solheim Cup. Europe were defeated 11.5–16.5 by USA at Des Moines Golf and Country Club, Iowa. She finished the event with a 2–3–0 (win–loss–tie) record and lost to Paula Creamer (1 up) in the singles on the final day. Reflecting on the tournament, Hall said: "It was an incredible experience throughout every minute. I already cannot wait for two years time."

Hall finished tied-3rd in the 2017 Women's British Open, five strokes behind champion In-Kyung Kim at Kingsbarns. She then finished tied-10th at the Evian Championship, the final major of 2017. Hall won the Ladies European Tour Order of Merit in 2017 after recording seven top-10 finishes during the season. These included a tied-4th at the Lalla Meryem Cup and tied-9th at the Women's Scottish Open. After winning the Order of Merit, Hall said: "It was one of my targets at the start of this year and I’m over the moon...this is one of the biggest moments in my career." In December 2017, she successfully made it through qualifying school to earn her LPGA tour card.

In February 2018, Hall finished in a tie for third at the ALPG Oates Victorian Open, and she followed this up by finishing T9th at the Canberra Classic. After she began playing on the LPGA Tour, Hall initially found it difficult adjusting her game in the United States, and she asked former golf professionals Ken Brown and Tom Lehman for advice. She secured her first LPGA top-10 finish of the year at the Thornberry Creek LPGA Classic in July, where she finished tied-7th.

Hall won her first major championship at the 2018 Women's British Open in August, finishing two shots ahead of Pornanong Phatlum at Royal Lytham & St Annes. Hall hit six birdies in her final round 67 to become the fifth British winner of a ladies major. Afterwards: Hall said, "It was my goal when I was nine years old on the putting green: 'This six-footer's for the British Open' and to actually have that, and luckily it was just a tap-in, I'm over the moon." She ended the season by winning her second consecutive Ladies European Tour Order of Merit, becoming the youngest player to defend the title. Hall was also named the Players' Player of the Year on the Ladies European Tour, and she finished the year eighth in the world rankings. At the end of the year, she was named Sunday Times Young Sportswomen of the Year.

In August 2019, Hall finished tied-35th in her defence of the Women's British Open at Woburn. Before the tournament, she revealed that her replica trophy from her win in 2018 had been stolen from her car two months previously. In the 2019 Solheim Cup at Gleneagles Hotel, Scotland. Hall won all four of her matches to help Europe to a 14.5–13.5 win over USA. She won three matches partnering Céline Boutier and then beat Lexi Thompson 2 and 1 in the final day singles. On the LPGA Tour in 2019, she recorded three top-10 finishes, with a best placing of tied-4th at the Volunteers of America Classic. Hall's world ranking dropped to 41 at the end of the year.

=== 2020–present ===
In 2020, the tour was heavily affected by the COVID-19 pandemic. Hall competed on the Rose Ladies Series, winning event six at Bearwood Lakes. and event seven at The Shire. She finished runner-up in the overall standings to Charley Hull. In September, she won for the second time on the LPGA tour. Her maiden win in the United States was secured at the Cambia Portland Classic, where she overcame Ashleigh Buhai in a sudden-death playoff. Prior to the playoff, Hall had held a one-stroke lead with one hole remaining, but scored a bogey, before triumphing at the second playoff hole. In November, Hall hit a seven-under-par 64 in her opening round to set a new course record at Royal Greens Golf and Country Club in the Saudi Ladies International. She finished runner-up, after Emily Kristine Pedersen defeated her in a playoff.

Hall declined the opportunity to compete for Great Britain at the Tokyo Summer Olympics in 2021, citing concerns about her "exhausting schedule" and the effect it would have on her preparation for upcoming events. She then finished tied-6th at the 2021 Evian Championship in France. She shot a 64 in the final round to finish the tournament 13-under-par, five strokes behind tournament winner Minjee Lee. In the 2021 Women's British Open at Carnoustie, Hall shot a five-under-par 67 on the final day to finish in a tie for second, one shot behind Anna Nordqvist. Hall was a member of the European team that triumphed 15–13 over USA in the 2021 Solheim Cup at the Inverness Club, Toledo, Ohio. She finished 1–2–1 from her four matches with her win coming in the foursomes with teammate Leona Maguire. They beat Yealimi Noh and Brittany Altomare 1 up. In the singles, Hall was defeated by Nelly Korda 1 up. During 2021, Hall recorded six top-10 finishes from eight starts on the Ladies European Tour, but with no victories. She finished the year at 29 in the world rankings.

In March 2022, Hall won the Saudi Ladies International in Jeddah by five strokes, to win her second Ladies European Tour competition. Hall came close to winning the Aramco Series-London in June, but finished runner-up after Bronte Law made a 50-foot eagle putt at the final hole to claim victory. At the 2022 Evian Championship, she finished tied-8th, marking her third top-10 finish in her last six majors. In August, she finished tied-22nd in the Women's British Open at Muirfield, and then finished third at the ISPS Handa World Invitational in Northern Ireland. Hall finished 2022 at 25 in the world rankings.

Hall was defeated in a playoff by Céline Boutier at the 2023 LPGA Drive On Championship, after both players had finished 20-under-par after four rounds. The following week, at the Los Angeles Open, she finished runner-up for the second week in succession, this time by one stroke to Yin Ruoning. During her third round in Los Angeles, Hall made two eagles and five birdies to equal her career best round of nine-under-par. She also finished tied-12th at the 2023 Chevron Championship, but her form then dipped and she missed the cut at two of the next three majors. In the 2023 Solheim Cup at Finca Cortesin in Casares, Andalusia, Hall finished with a 1–2–1 record. Her win came in the day one four-balls with Leona Maguire when they defeated Lexi Thompson and Lilia Vu 1 up. In the singles, she finished in a tie with Andrea Lee. Europe and USA finished tied on 14 points, meaning that Europe retained the trophy.

Hall was selected by Great Britain for the 2024 Summer Olympics in Paris. She finished tied-36th on five-over-par, 15 strokes behind gold medalist Lydia Ko. In August 2024, Hall was named by Suzann Pettersen as one of her wildcard picks for Europe's 2024 Solheim Cup team at the Robert Trent Jones Golf Club in Gainesville, Virginia. Explaining her choice, Pettersen said: "She has a great Solheim record and I really like her style in matchplay." Hall won two of her four matches, including a 4 and 3 victory against Andrea Lee in the final day singles, but could not prevent USA securing the overall victory. She finished the tournament with a 2–2–0 record. At the end of a difficult year, her ranking dropped to 65, and Hall said: "You always have a year which isn't your best and this year that's happened to me."

Hall finished tied-28th at the Chevron Championship in April 2025, after finishing one-over-par. She only recorded one top-10 finish in her first eight tournaments of 2025, missing five cuts, and saw her ranking fall to number 95. Hall consequently missed out on an appearance at the 2025 U.S. Women's Open, marking the first time since 2016 that she had missed the event.

Having taken a break from golf in August 2025 following her pregnancy announcement, Hall announced that she would return to the Ladies European Tour at the Jabra Ladies Open de France in May 2026. There, she finished tied-28th, before continuing her return to the sport with appearances at the Dutch Ladies Open and the Hulencourt Women's Open.

== Personal life ==
Hall was born to parents Wayne, a plasterer, and Samantha, a hairdresser. Hall has revealed that her family had to sell valuables to help fund her early ambitions in the sport. She was born during the 1996 Masters, which was won by Nick Faldo in Augusta, Georgia, which inspired her name. Her father acted as her caddie during the 2018 Women's British Open. After Hall shot 67 in her first round there, she banned him from changing his socks for the remainder of the tournament, which she went on to win.

Hall was once in a relationship with Harry Tyrrell, after the pair had originally met on Instagram. He later became her caddie. In 2023, Hall revealed that she was in a same-sex relationship with American golfer Ryann O'Toole, whom she met on the LPGA Tour. Hall said she hoped that her announcement would inspire people to be "true to themselves." In July 2025, Hall announced on Instagram that she had become engaged to Irish golfer Paul Dunne. The couple welcomed a son in 2026.

Hall has been close friends with fellow golfer Charley Hull since she was eleven. The pair grew up together and were inseparable. Hall says of their friendship: "We know how to pull each other up when we are down and vice versa."

Hall was appointed Member of the Order of the British Empire (MBE) in the 2019 Birthday Honours for services to golf. She was the fifth British female golfer to receive the honour. In June 2023, Hall launched a golf academy for children at Paulton's Golf Centre in Hampshire.

She is a supporter of Premier League football club AFC Bournemouth.

== Amateur wins ==
- 2009 English Girls under-13 Championship
- 2010 English Girls under-15 Championship
- 2012 Roehampton Gold Cup, Hampshire Rose, Critchley Salver, Girls Amateur Championship
- 2013 British Ladies Amateur Golf Championship

== Professional wins (7) ==
=== LPGA Tour wins (2) ===
Legend
Major championships (1)
Other LPGA Tour (1)

No.	Date	Tournament	Winning score	Margin of victory	Runner-up
1	5 Aug 2018	Ricoh Women's British Open	−17 (67-68-69-67=271)	2 strokes	(Thailand) Pornanong Phatlum
2	20 Sep 2020	Cambia Portland Classic	−12 (70-66-68=204)	Playoff	(South Africa) Ashleigh Buhai

LPGA Tour playoff record (1–1)

No.	Year	Tournament	Opponent	Result
1	2020	Cambia Portland Classic	(South Africa) Ashleigh Buhai	Won with par on second extra hole
2	2023	LPGA Drive On Championship	(France) Céline Boutier	Lost to birdie on first extra hole

=== Ladies European Tour wins (2) ===
No.	Date	Tournament	Winning score	Margin of victory	Runner-up
1	5 Aug 2018	Ricoh Women's British Open	−17 (67-68-69-67=271)	2 strokes	(Thailand) Pornanong Phatlum
2	20 Mar 2022	Aramco Saudi Ladies International	−11 (69-69-68-71=277)	5 strokes	(Sweden) Johanna Gustavsson (Czech Republic) Kristýna Napoleaová

LET Tour playoff record (0–1)

No.	Year	Tournament	Opponent	Result
1	2020	Saudi Ladies International	(Denmark) Emily Kristine Pedersen	Lost to a birdie the first extra hole

=== ALPG Tour wins (1) ===
No.	Date	Tournament	Winning score	To par	Margin of victory	Runners-up
1	7 Feb 2016	Oates Victorian Open	69-70-71-71=281	−11	1 stroke	(Denmark) Nanna Madsen, (Norway) Marianne Skarpnord

=== LET Access Series (1) ===
- 2014 Open Generali de Strasbourg

=== Other wins (2) ===
- 2020 Rose Ladies Series – Event 6, Rose Ladies Series – Event 7

== Major championships ==
=== Wins (1) ===
Year	Championship	54 holes	Winning score	Margin	Runner-up
2018	Ricoh Women's British Open	1 shot deficit	−17 (67-68-69-67=271)	2 strokes	(Thailand) Pornanong Phatlum

=== Results timeline ===
Results not in chronological order.

Tournament	2013	2014	2015	2016	2017	2018	2019	2020	2021	2022	2023	2024	2025	2026
Chevron Championship	CUT					CUT	T61	T37	T36	T13	T12	T23	T28	
U.S. Women's Open			CUT		T51	T34	CUT	CUT	CUT	T34	CUT	CUT		
Women's PGA Championship					T46	T40	T26	T58	T21	T21	CUT	T52	CUT	
The Evian Championship					T10	T16	T37	NT	T6	T8	T36	T17		
Women's British Open	T42TLA	T29	CUT	CUT	T3	1	T35	T45	T2	T22	T30	T22	T19	CUT

Win
Top 10
Did not play

LA = low amateur
CUT = missed the half-way cut
NT = no tournament
"T" = tied

=== Summary ===
Tournament	Wins	2nd	3rd	Top-5	Top-10	Top-25	Events	Cuts made
Chevron Championship	0	0	0	0	0	3	9	7
U.S. Women's Open	0	0	0	0	0	0	9	3
Women's PGA Championship	0	0	0	0	0	2	9	6
The Evian Championship	0	0	0	0	3	5	7	7
Women's British Open	1	1	1	3	3	6	14	11
Totals	1	1	1	3	6	16	48	35

- Most consecutive cuts made – 9 (2021 Women's PGA – 2023 Chevron)
- Longest streak of top-10s – 2 (twice)

== LPGA Tour career summary ==
Year	Tournaments played	Cuts made*	Wins (Majors)	2nd	3rd	Top 10s	Best finish	Earnings ($)	Money list rank	Scoring average	Scoring rank
2018	19	15	1 (1)	2	0	3	1	837,678	21	70.91	29
2019	24	19	0	0	0	3	T4	403,490	52	71.09	40
2020	12	11	1 (0)	0	0	2	1	444,563	21	71.05	17
2021	20	18	0	1	0	3	T2	856,659	20	70.63	29
2022	19	19	0	0	2	4	3	1,045,967	24	70.36	22
2023	22	19	0	2	0	5	2	911,664	31	70.32	17
2024	20	17	0	0	0	1	T5	549,436	70	71.27	51
2025	12	6	0	0	0	1	T9	214,358	105	71.54	73
Totals^	148	124	2 (1)	5	2	22	1	5,263,815	97		

^ Official as of 2025 season
* Includes matchplay and other tournaments without a cut.

== World ranking ==
Position in Women's World Golf Rankings at the end of each calendar year.

Year	Ranking	Source
2013	471	
2014	315	
2015	266	
2016	108	
2017	40	
2018	8	
2019	41	
2020	38	
2021	29	
2022	25	
2023	21	
2024	65	
2025	135	

== Team appearances ==
Amateur

- European Girls' Team Championship (representing England): 2011, 2012
- Junior Vagliano Trophy: (representing Great Britain & Ireland): 2011
- Espirito Santo Trophy (representing England): 2012
- European Ladies' Team Championship (representing England): 2013
- Junior Solheim Cup: (representing Europe): 2013
- Vagliano Trophy (representing Great Britain & Ireland): 2013
- Curtis Cup (representing Great Britain & Ireland): 2014

Professional

- The Queens (representing Europe): 2016
- Solheim Cup (representing Europe): 2017 (lost), 2019 (winners), 2021 (winners), 2023 (tie, cup retained), 2024 (lost)
- European Championships (representing Great Britain): 2018
- International Crown (representing England): 2018

=== Solheim Cup record ===
Year	Total matches	Total W–L–H	Singles W–L–H	Foursomes W–L–H	Fourballs W–L–H	Points won	Points %
Career	21	10–9–2	2–2–1	4–4–1	4–3–0	11	52.4
2017	5	2–3–0	0–1–0 lost to P. Creamer 1 dn	2–0–0 won w/ A. Nordqvist 3&1 won w/ A. Nordqvist 2&1	0–2–0 lost w/ C. Hull 2&1 lost w/ C. Matthew 4&2	2	40.0
2019	4	4–0–0	1–0–0 def. L. Thompson 2&1	2–0–0 won w/ C. Boutier 2&1 won w/ C. Boutier 3&2	1–0–0 won w/ C. Boutier 2 up	4	100.0
2021	4	1–2–1	0–1–0 lost to N. Korda 1 dn	0–1–1 halved w/ C. Boutier lost w/ M. Sagström 1 dn	1–0–0 won w/ L. Maguire 1 up	1.5	37.5
2023	4	1–2–1	0–0–1 halved w/ A. Lee	0–2–0 lost w/ C. Boutier 1 dn lost w/ C. Boutier 5&3	1–0–0 won w/ L. Maguire 1 up	1.5	37.5
2024	4	2–2–0	1–0–0 def. Al. Lee 4&3	0–1–0 lost w/ M. Stark 4&3	1–1–0 lost w/ L. Maguire 6&4 won w/ C. Hull 2 up	2	50.0
