= Emily Kristine Pedersen =

Danish professional golfer (born 1996)

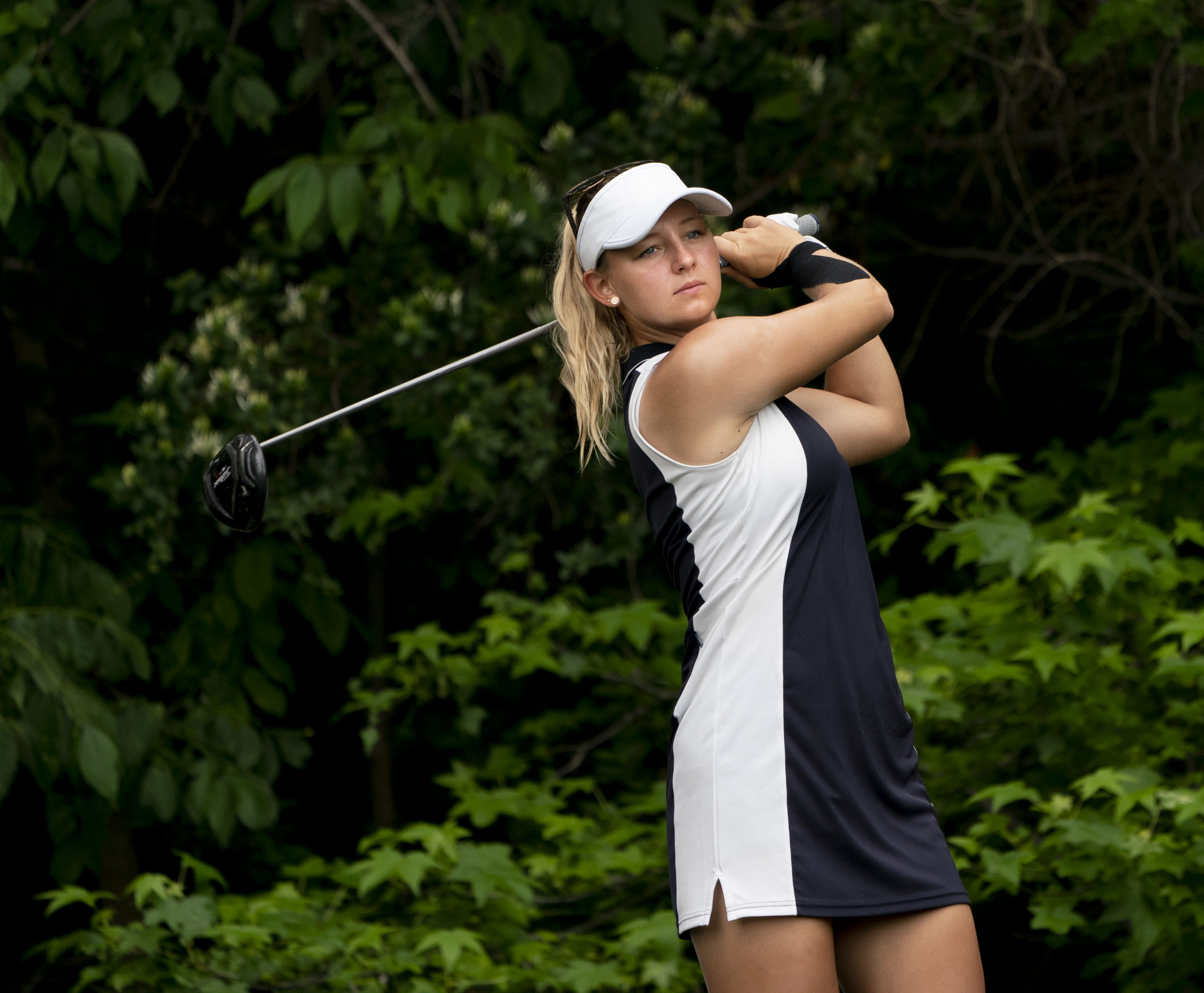
- Pedersen in 2018

Personal information
- Full name: Emily Kristine Pedersen
- Nationality: Denmark
- Born: 7 March 1996 (age 30) Copenhagen, Denmark
- Height: 1.71 m (5 ft 7 in)

Career
- Sport: Golf
- Turned professional: 2015
- Current tours: Ladies European Tour; LPGA Tour
- Professional wins: 6

Number of wins by tour
- Ladies European Tour: 5
- Other: 1

Best results in LPGA major championships
- Chevron Championship: T24: 2025
- Women's PGA C'ship: T36: 2017
- U.S. Women's Open: T23: 2021
- Women's British Open: T11: 2020
- Evian Championship: T11: 2025

Achievements and awards
- Den Gyldne Golfbold (PoY in Denmark): 2013, 2020
- Ladies European Tour Rookie of the Year: 2015
- Ladies European Tour Order of Merit winner: 2020
- Ladies European Tour Player of the Year: 2020

Emily Kristine Pedersen (born 7 March 1996) is a Danish professional golfer who plays on the Ladies European Tour and LPGA Tour. She had a successful amateur career winning the 2013 International European Ladies Amateur Championship and the 2014 British Ladies Amateur Golf Championship. Turning professional in early 2015 she had a successful first season, finishing runner-up in the Deloitte Ladies Open and the Lacoste Ladies Open de France before winning the Hero Women's Indian Open. She was named LET Rookie of the Year for 2015.

Pedersen earned her card for the 2022 LPGA Tour through qualifying school.

She made only the second hole-in-one in Solheim Cup history in 2023 on the 12th hole in the afternoon four-ball on 22 September 2023.

== Amateur wins ==
- 2010 Mølleån Open, Danish Match Play, Royal Tour Damer III
- 2011 Doral Publix Junior Classic (14–15)
- 2012 Furesøpokalen, DGU Elite Tour Damer III, Doral-Publix Junior Classic
- 2013 Spanish Ladies Amateur, German Girls Open, International European Ladies Amateur Championship, DGU Elite Tour Damer Finale, Doral-Publix Junior Classic (16–18)
- 2014 British Ladies Amateur

== Professional wins (6) ==
=== Ladies European Tour wins (5) ===
No.	Date	Tournament	Winning score	To par	Margin of victory	Runner(s)-up
1	25 Oct 2015	Hero Women's Indian Open^{1}	70-73-73=216	E	1 stroke	(Denmark) Malene Jørgensen (Wales) Becky Morgan (United States) Cheyenne Woods
2	30 Aug 2020	Tipsport Czech Ladies Open	63-65-71=199	−17	4 strokes	(Austria) Christine Wolf
3	15 Nov 2020	Aramco Saudi Ladies International	67-68-71-72=278	−10	Playoff	(England) Georgia Hall
4	19 Nov 2020	Saudi Ladies Team International (individual event)	69-66-67=202	−14	2 strokes	(Netherlands) Anne van Dam (Australia) Stephanie Kyriacou (Spain) Luna Sobrón
5	29 Nov 2020	Andalucia Costa Del Sol Open De España	68-71-68-66=273	−15	4 strokes	(Spain) Nuria Iturrioz

^{1} Co-sanctioned by Ladies Asian Golf Tour

LET playoff record (1–2)

No.	Year	Tournament	Opponent	Result
1	2015	Open de France Dames	(France) Céline Herbin	Herbin won with a par on the third extra hole
2	2020	ASI Ladies Scottish Open	(United States) Cheyenne Knight (United States) Stacy Lewis (Spain) Azahara Muñoz	Lewis won with a birdie on the first extra hole
2	2020	Saudi Ladies International	(England) Georgia Hall	Pedersen won with a birdie on the first extra hole

=== Danish Golf Tour wins (1) ===
No.	Date	Tournament	Winning score	Margin of victory	Runner-up
1	10 Jun 2020	Bravo Tours Open	−11 (66-67=133)	1 stroke	(Denmark) Oliver Suhr

== Results in LPGA majors ==
Results not in chronological order.

Tournament	2014	2015	2016	2017	2018	2019	2020	2021	2022	2023	2024	2025
Chevron Championship					CUT				CUT	CUT	CUT	T24
U.S. Women's Open					T41		CUT	T23			T58	
Women's PGA Championship				T36	CUT	CUT		CUT	T50	T52	CUT	CUT
The Evian Championship	T47	T25	T14	CUT			NT	T19		CUT	54	T11
Women's British Open	CUT	CUT	T40	CUT			T11	T42	T22	T30	CUT	

Did not play

CUT = missed the half-way cut
NT = no tournament
"T" = tied

=== Summary ===
Tournament	Wins	2nd	3rd	Top-5	Top-10	Top-25	Events	Cuts made
Chevron Championship	0	0	0	0	0	1	5	1
U.S. Women's Open	0	0	0	0	0	1	4	3
Women's PGA Championship	0	0	0	0	0	0	8	3
The Evian Championship	0	0	0	0	0	4	8	6
Women's British Open	0	0	0	0	0	2	9	5
Totals	0	0	0	0	0	8	34	18

- Most consecutive cuts made – 3 (twice)
- Longest streak of top-10s – 0

== World ranking ==
Position in Women's World Golf Rankings at the end of each calendar year.

Year	Ranking	Source
2014	460	
2015	118	
2016	100	
2017	153	
2018	323	
2019	509	
2020	71	
2021	74	
2022	126	
2023	110	
2024	132	
2025	169	

== Team appearances ==
Amateur

- European Girls' Team Championship (representing the Denmark): 2011, 2012
- Junior Vagliano Trophy: (representing the Continent of Europe): 2011 (winners)
- Junior Ryder Cup (representing Europe): 2012, 2014
- European Ladies' Team Championship (representing Denmark): 2013
- Junior Solheim Cup: (representing Europe): 2013
- Vagliano Trophy (representing the Continent of Europe): 2013 (winners)
- Espirito Santo Trophy (representing Denmark): 2014

Professional

- The Queens (representing Europe): 2015
- Solheim Cup (representing Europe): 2017, 2021 (winners), 2023 (tie, cup retained), 2024

=== Solheim Cup record ===
Year	Total matches	Total W–L–H	Singles W–L–H	Foursomes W–L–H	Fourballs W–L–H	Points won	Points %
Career	17	7–9–1	1–3–0	3–4–0	3–2–1	7.5	44.1
2017	3	0–3–0	0–1–0 lost to D. Kang 3&1	0–1–0 lost w/ M. Reid 5&3	0–1–0 lost w/ C. Ciganda 6&5	0	0.0
2021	4	3–1–0	1–0–0 def. D. Kang 1 up	1–1–0 won w/ C. Hull 3&1 lost w/ C. Hull 2&1	1–0–0 won w/ C. Hull 3&2	3	75.0
2023	5	2–2–1	0–1–0 lost to L. Thompson 2&1	1–1–0 lost w/ C. Hull 5&4 won w/ C. Ciganda 2&1	1–0–1 halved w/ M. Stark won w/ M. Sagström 2&1	2.5	50.0
2024	5	2–3–0	0–1–0 lost to M. Khang 6&5	1–1–0 won w/ M. Stark 2 up lost w/ C. Ciganda 1 dn	1–1–0 lost w/ M. Stark 3&2 won w/ C. Ciganda 2&1	2.0	40.0
