= Gemma Dryburgh =

Scottish professional golfer (born 1993)

Personal information
- Nationality: Scotland
- Born: 11 June 1993 (age 33) Aberdeen, Scotland
- Height: 5 ft 5 in (165 cm)

Career
- Sport: Golf
- College: Tulane University
- Turned professional: 2015
- Current tours: LPGA Tour; Ladies European Tour
- Former tours: ALPG Tour; Symetra Tour; LET Access Series
- Professional wins: 5

Number of wins by tour
- LPGA Tour: 1
- LPGA of Japan Tour: 1
- WPGA Tour of Australasia: 1

Best results in LPGA major championships
- Chevron Championship: T45: 2023
- Women's PGA C'ship: T43: 2019
- U.S. Women's Open: T31: 2023
- Women's British Open: T36: 2023
- Evian Championship: 8th: 2023

Gemma Dryburgh (born 11 June 1993) is a Scottish professional golfer.

== Amateur career ==
Dryburgh played college golf at Tulane University. She competed in the 2014 Curtis Cup and the 2014 Espirito Santo Trophy.

== Professional career ==
Dryburgh played on the LET Access Series in 2015, making the cut in three of four events. She played on the Symetra Tour in 2016 and 2017, making three cuts in five events in 2016 and six cuts in ten events in 2017. She played on the ALPG Tour for the 2016–17 season, notching her first professional victory at the Oatlands Ladies Pro Am.

Dryburgh has played on the Ladies European Tour since 2016 with a best finish of T6 at the 2017 Fatima Bint Mubarak Ladies Open.

Dryburgh has played on the LPGA Tour since 2018. She made her major championship debut at the 2019 Women's PGA Championship.

== Amateur wins ==
- 2010 Feather Sound Open
- 2012 Old Waverly Bulldog Invite

== Professional wins (5) ==
=== LPGA Tour wins (1) ===
Legend
LPGA Tour major championships (0)
Other LPGA Tour (1)

No.	Date	Tournament	Winning score	To par	Margin of victory	Runner-up	Winner's share ($)
1	6 Nov 2022	Toto Japan Classic^	71-67-65-65=268	−20	4 strokes	(Japan) Kana Nagai	300,000

^ Co-sanctioned with LPGA of Japan Tour

=== ALPG Tour wins (1) ===
- 2017 Oatlands Ladies Pro Am

=== Other wins (3) ===
- 2020 Rose Ladies Series – Event 3 Rose Ladies Series – Event 4
- 2021 Rose Ladies Series at JCB

== Results in LPGA majors ==
Results not in chronological order.

Tournament	2019	2020	2021	2022	2023	2024	2025	2026
Chevron Championship					T45	T54	CUT	CUT
U.S. Women's Open				CUT	T31	CUT	T51	
Women's PGA Championship	T43	CUT		CUT	T61	CUT	CUT	T59
The Evian Championship		NT		T60	8	T17	T49	
Women's British Open		CUT	CUT	63	T36	CUT	CUT	

Top 10
Did not play

CUT = missed the half-way cut
NT = no tournament
T = tied

=== Summary ===
Tournament	Wins	2nd	3rd	Top-5	Top-10	Top-25	Events	Cuts made
Chevron Championship	0	0	0	0	0	0	4	2
U.S. Women's Open	0	0	0	0	0	0	4	2
Women's PGA Championship	0	0	0	0	0	0	7	3
The Evian Championship	0	0	0	0	1	2	4	4
Women's British Open	0	0	0	0	0	0	6	2
Totals	0	0	0	0	1	2	25	13

== World ranking ==
Position in Women's World Golf Rankings at the end of each calendar year.

Year	Ranking	Source
2015	924	
2016	478	
2017	403	
2018	486	
2019	283	
2020	229	
2021	319	
2022	72	
2023	64	
2024	124	
2025	175	

== Team appearances ==
Amateur

- European Ladies' Team Championship (representing Scotland): 2013, 2014
- Curtis Cup (representing Great Britain & Ireland): 2014
- Espirito Santo Trophy (representing Scotland): 2014

Professional

- Solheim Cup: 2023 (tie, cup retained )

=== Solheim Cup record ===
Year	Total matches	Total W–L–H	Singles W–L–H	Foursomes W–L–H	Fourballs W–L–H	Points won	Points %
Career	2	0–0–2	0–0–1	0–0–0	0–0–1	1	50.0
2023	2	0–0–2	0–0–1 halved w/ C. Knight	0–0–0	0–0–1 halved w/ M. Sagström	1	50.0
