= Liz Young (golfer) =

English professional golfer

Personal information
- Full name: Elizabeth Young
- Nationality: England
- Born: 23 October 1982 (age 44) Southampton, England
- Height: 5 ft 8 in (1.73 m)

Career
- Sport: Golf
- College: University of Iowa
- Turned professional: 2009
- Current tour: Ladies European Tour (joined 2009)
- Professional wins: 2

Number of wins by tour
- Ladies European Tour: 2

Best results in LPGA major championships
- Chevron Championship: DNP
- Women's PGA C'ship: DNP
- U.S. Women's Open: DNP
- Women's British Open: T61: 2013
- Evian Championship: DNP

Elizabeth Young (née Bennett, born 23 October 1982) is an English professional golfer. In 2022, her 14th season on the Ladies European Tour, she secured her maiden victory at the VP Bank Swiss Ladies Open, a month before her 40th birthday.

== Early life and amateur career ==
Young started playing golf at the age of 12 with her older brother James. She attended the University of Iowa and earned a BA in economics.

As an amateur, she represented England and won the 2007 The Spirit International Amateur Golf Championship in Texas together with Naomi Edwards, Gary Boyd and Danny Willett. Her team finished fourth in the 2008 European Ladies' Team Championship in Stenungsund, Sweden. She represented Great Britain & Ireland at the 2008 Curtis Cup at St Andrews.

Individually, she won the 2006 English Women's Open Amateur Stroke Play Championship and won the 2008 English Amateur Order of Merit. In 2008, she also won the Sally Tournament on the Orange Blossom Tour in the United States.

== Professional career ==
Young turned professional 2009 and joined the Ladies European Tour the same year. In her first 13 LET seasons, her best finish was a T4 at the 2013 Allianz Ladies Slovak Open. The same year she made the cut at the Women's British Open.

In 2016, Young competed in the Women's British Open, held at Woburn while being 7-months pregnant. Following the birth of her child, she took maternity leave from the LET and returned to compete in April 2017 at the Lalla Meryem Cup in Morocco.

In 2022, Young carded a final-round 69 to beat Linn Grant by one stroke and win the VP Bank Swiss Ladies Open, her first title, in her 14th LET season and a month before her 40th birthday.

== Rose Ladies Series ==
In 2020 during the COVID-19 pandemic, Young along with the then head professional Jason MacNiven at her home club Brokenhurst Manor, proposed a tournament in which lady professionals could compete once again under COVID restrictions. This Ladies Open competition was reported by Kate Rowan in the Daily Telegraph and rapidly became a series of 10 tournaments nationwide following the support of Kate and Justin Rose culminating in a series final at the Wentworth Club. The Rose Ladies Series opening event at Brokenhurst Manor was the first professional golf event to take place during the pandemic restrictions and was won by Charley Hull after a playoff with Young.

== Personal life ==
She competed as Liz Bennett until April 2013, when she married Jonathan Young.

== Amateur wins ==
- 2006 English Women's Open Amateur Stroke Play Championship
- 2008 Sally Tournament

== Professional wins (2) ==
=== Ladies European Tour wins (2) ===
No.	Date	Tournament	Winning score	To par	Margin of victory	Runner(s)-up
1	10 Sep 2022	VP Bank Swiss Ladies Open	68-67-69=204	−12	1 stroke	(Sweden) Linn Grant
2	27 Oct 2024	Hero Women's Indian Open	74-73-67-72=286	−2	1 stroke	(Belgium) Manon De Roey, (New Zealand) Momoka Kobori (France) Agathe Sauzon, (Singapore) Shannon Tan

== Results in LPGA majors ==
Young only competed in the Women's British Open.

Tournament	2008	2009	2010	2011	2020	2012	2013	2014	2015	2016	2017	2018	2019	2020	2021	2022	2023	2024	2025
Women's British Open	CUT						T61	CUT		CUT						CUT	CUT		CUT

Did not play

CUT = missed the half-way cut
T=tied

== Team appearances ==
Amateur

- Women's Home Internationals (representing Great Britain and Ireland): 2006 (winners), 2007 (winners), 2008
- Vagliano Trophy: (representing Great Britain & Ireland): 2007
- Spirit International (representing England): 2007 (winners)
- Curtis Cup (representing Great Britain & Ireland): 2008
- European Ladies' Team Championship (representing England): 2008
- Espirito Santo Trophy (representing England): 2008

Professional

- International Crown (representing England): 2023
