= Alice Hewson =

English professional golfer (born 1997)

Personal information
- Nationality: England
- Born: 19 August 1997 (age 29) Hemel Hempstead, Hertfordshire, England
- Height: 5 ft 9 in (175 cm)

Career
- Sport: Golf
- College: Clemson University
- Turned professional: 2019
- Current tour: Ladies European Tour (joined 2020)
- Professional wins: 4

Number of wins by tour
- Ladies European Tour: 3
- Other: 1

Best results in LPGA major championships
- Chevron Championship: DNP
- Women's PGA C'ship: DNP
- U.S. Women's Open: CUT: 2023
- Women's British Open: T16: 2023
- Evian Championship: 75th: 2021

Alice Hewson (born 19 August 1997) is an English professional golfer and Ladies European Tour player. She won the 2020 Investec South African Women's Open and the VP Bank Swiss Ladies Open in 2024 and 2025. In 2019, she won the European Ladies Amateur.

== Amateur career ==
Hewson hails from Berkhamsted, Hertfordshire. She started golf at the age of six with her Dad and played in her first tournament on her seventh birthday. She won the England U13 championships and was in the National U18 team at age 15. Her first GB&I cap came at age 15 in the Junior Vagliano Trophy and she played in three Vagliano Trophies. She also represented Great Britain & Ireland in the Curtis Cup in 2016 and 2018 and the Astor Trophy.

Hewson represented England twice at the European Girls' Team Championship and five times at the European Ladies' Team Championship. She was the only player to be part of both England teams to win the European Ladies' Team Championships consecutively in 2016 and 2017.

Hewson attended Clemson University 2015–2019 and majored in accounting. She won her first two tournaments as a freshman, and by the time she graduated she held 49 records at Clemson.

Individually, she played in the inaugural Augusta National Women's Amateur in 2019 and finished tied 10th at even-par. Also in 2019, she captured the European Ladies Amateur Championship. She scored two eagles coming from seven shots behind in the final round to win in a five-hole playoff. The win qualified her for her first major, the 2019 Women's British Open, played at Woburn Golf and Country Club, less than 30 minutes from her home.

== Professional career ==
In 2020, Hewson finished 5th at LET Q-School at La Manga Club and started her LET career with a win in her first event, the Investec South African Women's Open. Held at Westlake Golf Club in Cape Town in mid-March, it was the last tournament played before the COVID-19 pandemic caused a global halt of competitive play.

To keep sharp during lockdown she played in the Rose Ladies Series where she won the Grand Final with scores of 67 and 70 (−5), ahead of seasoned campaigners and Solheim Cup stars such as Charley Hull and Georgia Hall.

In 2021, Hewson finished 10th in the rankings. She recorded five top-10 finishes including a T-3 at the Saudi Ladies International.

In 2022, she finished 12th in the rankings after five top-10 including T-3s at the Joburg Ladies Open and Skaftö Open.

Hewson was runner-up at the 2023 Magical Kenya Ladies Open, before claiming her second LET title at the 2024 VP Bank Swiss Ladies Open with a birdie on the first playoff hole, a title she successfully defended in 2025.

== Amateur wins ==
- 2010 England U13 Championship
- 2013 Scottish U16 Championship, Daily Telegraph Championship
- 2015 Cougar Classic, Lady Paladin
- 2018 Clemson Invitational
- 2019 European Ladies Amateur Championship

== Professional wins (4) ==
=== Ladies European Tour wins (3) ===
No.	Date	Tournament	Winning score	Margin of victory	Runner(s)-up
1	14 Mar 2020	Investec South African Women's Open	−5 (70-70-71=211)	1 stroke	(Sweden) Emma Nilsson (South Africa) Monique Smit
2	30 Jun 2024	VP Bank Swiss Ladies Open	−11 (68-69-65=202)	Playoff	(India) Tvesa Malik
3	13 Sep 2025	VP Bank Swiss Ladies Open	−13 (66-67-67=200)	5 strokes	(Sweden) Kajsa Arwefjäll (Switzerland) Chiara Tamburlini (Republic of Ireland) Lauren Walsh

Ladies European Tour playoff record (1–0)

No.	Year	Tournament	Opponent	Result
1	2024	VP Bank Swiss Ladies Open	(India) Tvesa Malik	Won with birdie on first extra hole

=== Other wins (1) ===
- 2020 Rose Ladies Series Grand Final

== Results in LPGA majors ==
Tournament	2019	2020	2021	2022	2023	2024	2025	2026
Chevron Championship								
U.S. Women's Open					CUT			
Women's PGA Championship								
The Evian Championship		NT	75		CUT		CUT	CUT
Women's British Open	CUT	CUT	T20	CUT	T16	CUT	CUT	T53

Did not play

CUT = missed the half-way cut
NT = no tournament
T = tied

=== Summary ===
Tournament	Wins	2nd	3rd	Top-5	Top-10	Top-25	Events	Cuts made
Chevron Championship	0	0	0	0	0	0	0	0
U.S. Women's Open	0	0	0	0	0	0	1	0
Women's PGA Championship	0	0	0	0	0	0	0	0
The Evian Championship	0	0	0	0	0	0	4	1
Women's British Open	0	0	0	0	0	2	8	3
Totals	0	0	0	0	0	2	13	4

== Team appearances ==
Amateur

- Junior Vagliano Trophy: (representing Great Britain & Ireland): 2013
- Vagliano Trophy (representing Great Britain & Ireland): 2015, 2017, 2019
- Curtis Cup (representing Great Britain & Ireland): 2016 (winners), 2018
- Astor Trophy (representing Great Britain & Ireland): 2019
- European Girls' Team Championship (representing England): 2013, 2014
- European Ladies' Team Championship (representing England): 2015, 2016 (winners), 2017 (winners), 2018, 2019
- Espirito Santo Trophy (representing England): 2016

Professional

- International Crown (representing England): 2023
