= Bearwood Lakes Golf Club =

Golf club in Berkshire, England

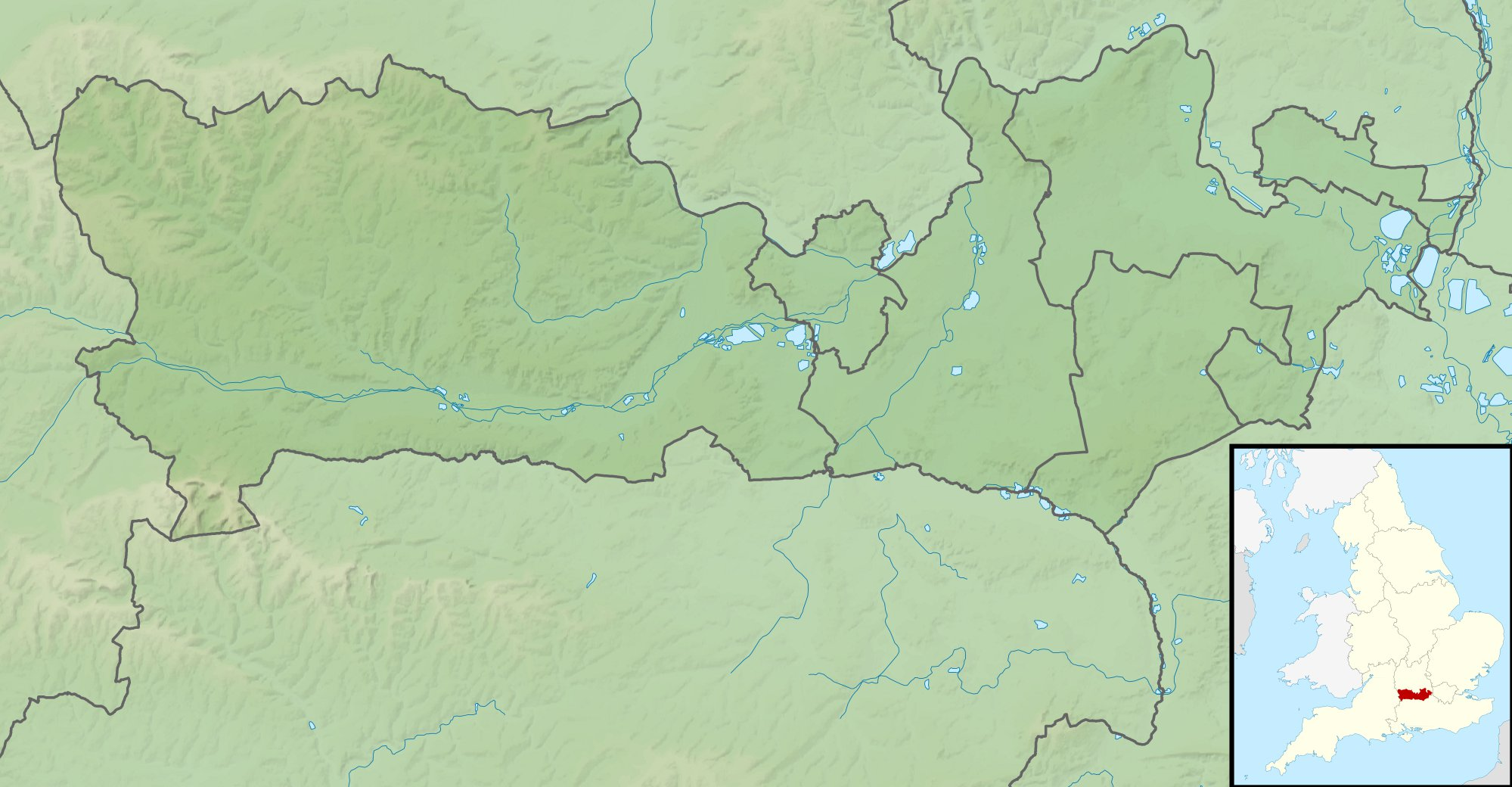
- Location within Berkshire
- 51.409242°N 0.875553°W

Club information
- Location: Sindlesham, Berkshire, England
- Established: 1996
- Tota holes: 18
- Website: www.bearwoodlakes.co.uk

Bearwood Lakes Golf Club is a golf club, located in Sindlesham, Berkshire, England. It was established in 1996.

In 2019, a new purpose-built all-weather practice facility was inaugurated.

== Rankings ==
- In 2018, the club was included in the list of 10 most exclusive golf clubs in the United Kingdom by Golf Monthly.
