= Minjee Lee =

Australian professional golfer (born 1996)

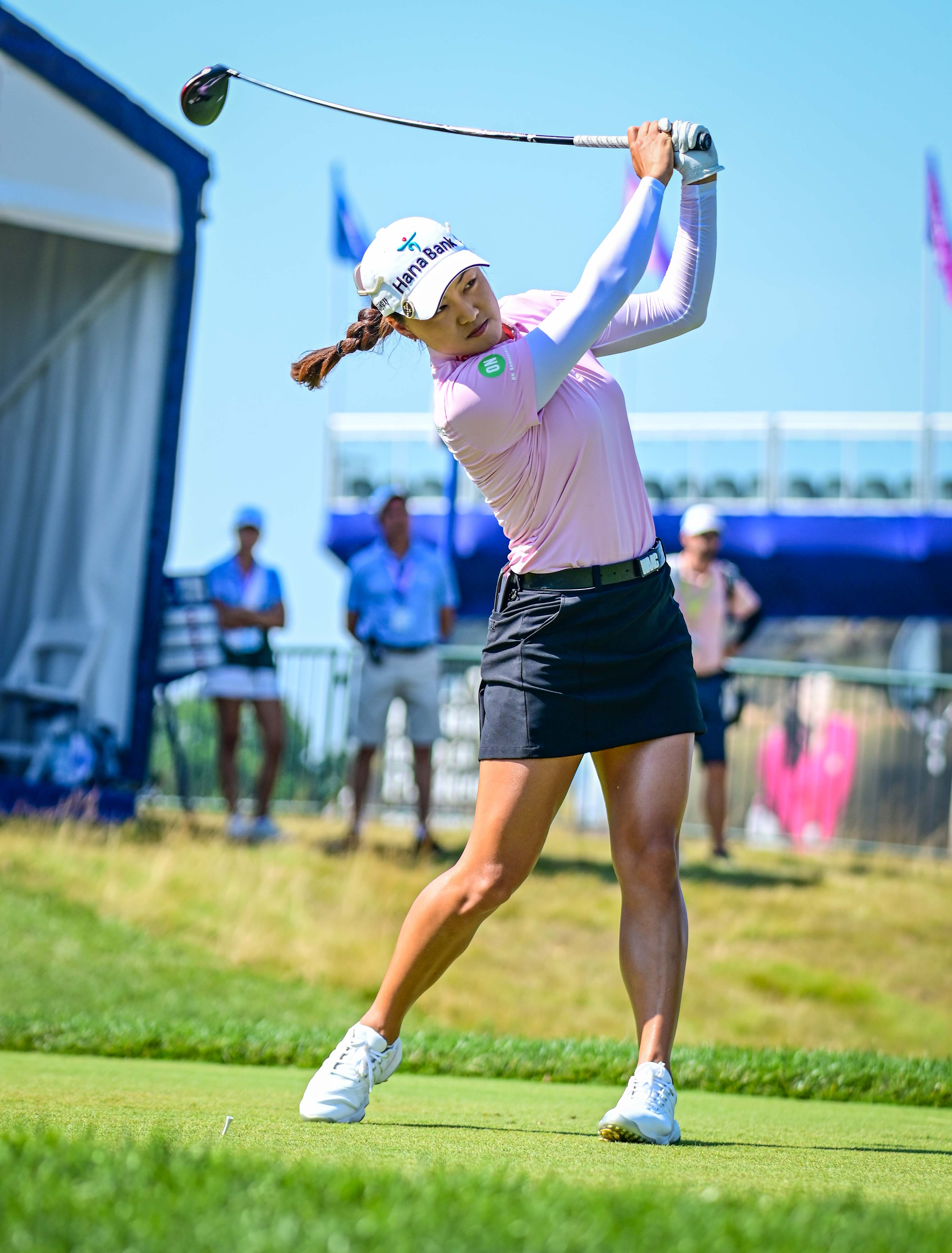
- Lee in 2022

Personal information
- Nationality: Australia
- Born: 27 May 1996 (age 30) Perth, Western Australia, Australia

Career
- Sport: Golf
- Turned professional: 2014
- Current tour: LPGA Tour
- Professional wins: 14

Number of wins by tour
- LPGA Tour: 11
- Ladies European Tour: 3
- WPGA Tour of Australasia: 2

Best results in LPGA major championships (wins: 3)
- Chevron Championship: T3: 2017
- Women's PGA C'ship: Won: 2025
- U.S. Women's Open: Won: 2022
- Women's British Open: 3rd: 2020
- Evian Championship: Won: 2021

Achievements and awards
- Greg Norman Medal: 2018, 2021, 2023
- Rolex Annika Major Award: 2022, 2025

- Minjee Lee
- Hangul: 이민지
- Hanja: 李旻芝
- RR: I Minji
- MR: I Minji

Minjee Lee (born 27 May 1996) is an Australian professional golfer. She is from Perth, Australia. Lee became the number one ranked amateur golfer in February 2014 after winning the Oates Victorian Open, remaining number one until turning professional in September 2014. Lee has won three major championships: the 2021 Amundi Evian Championship, the 2022 U.S. Women's Open, and the 2025 Women's PGA Championship.

== Early life and amateur career ==
In 1996, Lee was born in Perth, Australia. In 2010, Lee became the youngest winner of the WA Amateur Open while still a year 9 student at Methodist Ladies' College, Perth. At the start of 2012, she was moved from MLC to Corpus Christi College, to be closer to Royal Fremantle Golf Club. She left Corpus Christi in 2013.

Lee was the winner of the 2012 U.S. Girls' Junior. She won the Australian Women's Amateur in 2013 and successfully defended the title in 2014.

Lee became the number one ranked amateur golfer on 26 February 2014 after winning the Oates Victorian Open on the ALPG Tour. She remained the number one ranked amateur golfer until September 2014 after leading the Australia team that won the Espirito Santo Trophy.

== Professional career ==
In September 2014, Lee turned professional. On 18 May 2015, Lee gained her first LPGA Tour victory at the Kingsmill Championship. In 2016, she won the Lotte Championship in April, and the Blue Bay LPGA in October. She recorded her first ever hole-in-one at the 2016 Kia Classic by making an albatross on a par four. It was just the second time a player had made a hole-in-one on a par four on the LPGA Tour. Lee represented Australia in the women's golf competition at the 2016 Summer Olympics in Rio de Janeiro, Brazil, finishing in a tie for 7th.

In April 2018, she lost the LPGA Mediheal Championship in a playoff to Lydia Ko. In May, she won the LPGA Volvik Championship. Lee finished 2018 ranked second on the money list with $1,551,032 in earnings, finishing second in scoring average with 69.75 shots per round. She also became the first woman to win the Greg Norman Medal for being the best Australian professional golfer on the world stage. In April 2019, Lee won the Hugel-Air Premia LA Open, her fifth LPGA Tour victory. By late the following month, she had risen to number two in the Women's World Golf Rankings but in her home country she still had such a low profile that she was described by The Age as the "Invisible Champion of Australia".

Lee qualified for the Tokyo 2020 Olympics and competed in the women's competition. She scored −4 across the four rounds and finished 29th, out of medal contention. In July 2021, Lee won her first major championship, the Amundi Evian Championship, by coming from seven strokes behind in the final round and defeating Lee Jeong-eun on the first playoff hole.

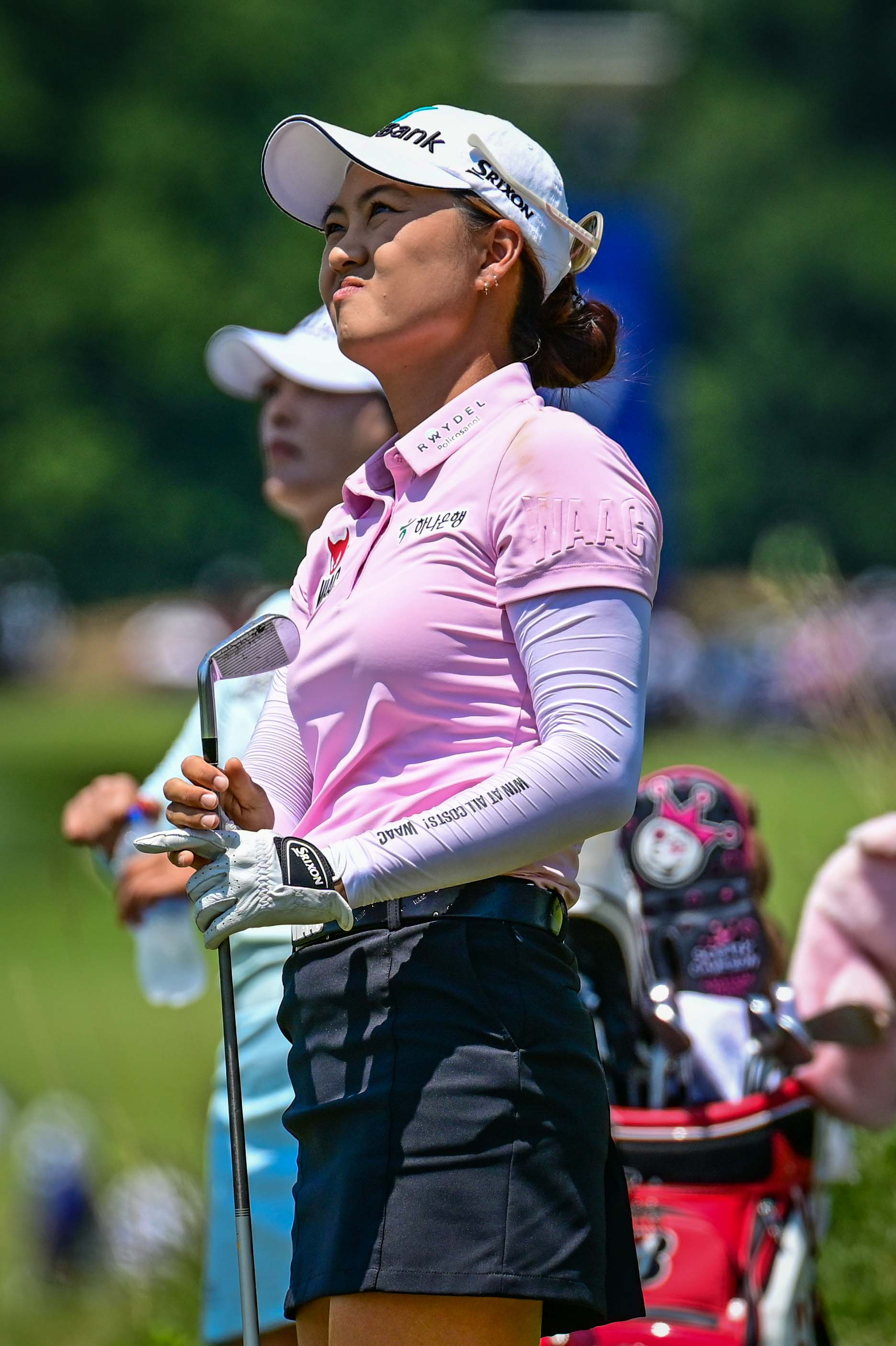
Minjee Lee at the 2022 KPMG Women's PGA Championship

In 2022, Lee had a sterling season. She won her seventh LPGA Tour event, the Cognizant Founders Cup, in May, defeating Lexi Thompson by two strokes, 269 (19-under-par) to Thompson's 271. Her eighth LPGA Tour win, the U.S. Women's Open on 5 June 2022, earned her the largest payday to date in women's golf history, $1.8 million of the $10 million total purse. Lee won by four strokes over Mina Harigae. This was the first occasion in a women's golf tournament where there were two prizes in excess of $1 million. Lee set a new record of 271, and led Harigae by three strokes after 54 holes. In November, she won the season-long Aon Risk Reward Challenge and $1,000,000 for the 2022 LPGA Tour season. This challenge selects one hole in every participating event and designates it as the Aon Risk Reward hole for that week. The challenge rewards the player who has the best two scores from every participating event that a player competes in throughout the season, measured by the lowest average score to par on these holes.

In June 2025, Lee secured her third victory in a major after claiming the title at the Women's PGA Championship. The following month, she recorded a third-placed finish at the Evian Championship, one stroke behind a two-way playoff for the title. In August, Lee became the first person to win the Rolex Annika Major Award on two occasions. In October, Lee helped Australia win the International Crown for the first time. On 5 May 2026, Minjee Lee committed to joining the WTGL.

== Personal life ==
Lee's parents, Soonam and Clara Lee, are both from South Korea, and emigrated to Australia in the early 1990s. Lee's younger brother, Min Woo, won the 2016 U.S. Junior Amateur, making them the first brother/sister pair to win the USGA's junior championships.

== Awards and honors ==
- In 2018, 2021, and 2023 she earned the Greg Norman Medal, bestowed to the top Australian international golfer. In 2018, she became the first female to earn the award.
- In 2022 and 2025, Lee earned the Rolex Annika Major Award, dispensed to the golfer who was the most successful in the female majors.
- In 2025, Lee was named the recipient of the Western Australian Sports Star of the Year.

== Amateur wins ==
- 2010 Western Australia Women's Amateur
- 2011 Handa Junior Masters, Western Australia Women's Amateur, Singapore Ladies Amateur, Srixon International Junior Classic, Tasmanian Stroke Play Championship
- 2012 U.S. Girls' Junior, Tasmanian Stroke Play Championship
- 2013 Australian Women's Amateur, Western Australia Women's Amateur, Rene Erichsen Salver, Australian Girls' Amateur, Dunes Medal
- 2014 Australian Women's Amateur

== Professional wins (14) ==
=== LPGA Tour wins (11) ===
Legend
Major championships (3)
Other LPGA Tour (8)

No.	Date	Tournament	Winning score	To par	Margin of victory	Runner(s)-up
1	18 May 2015	Kingsmill Championship	68-67-69-65=269	−15	2 strokes	(South Korea) Ryu So-yeon
2	16 Apr 2016	Lotte Championship	68-66-74-64=272	−16	1 stroke	(United States) Katie Burnett (South Korea) Chun In-gee
3	23 Oct 2016	Blue Bay LPGA	65-67-73-70=275	−13	1 stroke	(United States) Jessica Korda
4	27 May 2018	LPGA Volvik Championship	67-69-68-68=272	−16	1 stroke	(South Korea) In-Kyung Kim
5	28 Apr 2019	Hugel-Air Premia LA Open	66-69-67-68=270	−14	4 strokes	(South Korea) Kim Sei-young
6	25 Jul 2021	Amundi Evian Championship^{[1]}	68-69-65-64=266	−18	Playoff	(South Korea) Lee Jeong-eun
7	15 May 2022	Cognizant Founders Cup	67-63-69-70=269	−19	2 strokes	(United States) Lexi Thompson
8	5 June 2022	U.S. Women's Open	67-66-67-71=271	−13	4 strokes	(United States) Mina Harigae
9	10 Sep 2023	Kroger Queen City Championship	67-69-65-71=272	−16	Playoff	(England) Charley Hull
10	22 Oct 2023	BMW Ladies Championship	64-69-71-68=272	−16	Playoff	(United States) Alison Lee
11	22 Jun 2025	KPMG Women's PGA Championship	69-72-69-74=284	−4	3 strokes	(United States) Auston Kim (Thailand) Chanettee Wannasaen

^{1} Co-sanctioned by the Ladies European Tour.

LPGA Tour playoff record (3–3)

No.	Year	Tournament	Opponent(s)	Result
1	2018	LPGA Mediheal Championship	(New Zealand) Lydia Ko	Lost to eagle on first extra hole
2	2019	Taiwan Swinging Skirts LPGA	(United States) Nelly Korda (Germany) Caroline Masson	Korda won with birdie on first extra hole
3	2021	Amundi Evian Championship	(South Korea) Lee Jeong-eun	Won with birdie on first extra hole
4	2023	Cognizant Founders Cup	(South Korea) Ko Jin-young	Lost to par on first extra hole
5	2023	Kroger Queen City Championship	(England) Charley Hull	Won with birdie on second extra hole
6	2023	BMW Ladies Championship	(United States) Alison Lee	Won with birdie on first extra hole

=== Ladies European Tour wins (3) ===
No.	Date	Tournament	Winning score	To par	Margin of victory	Runner(s)-up
1	4 Feb 2018	Oates Vic Open^{[2]}	70-67-75-67=279	−13	5 strokes	(Australia) Karis Davidson
2	6 Nov 2020	Omega Dubai Moonlight Classic	72-65-69=206	−10	Playoff	(France) Céline Boutier
3	25 Jul 2021	Amundi Evian Championship^{[3]}	68-69-65-64=266	−18	Playoff	(South Korea) Lee Jeong-eun

^{2} Co-sanctioned by the ALPG Tour.
^{3} Co-sanctioned by the LPGA Tour.

LET playoff record (2–0)

No.	Year	Tournament	Opponent	Result
1	2020	Omega Dubai Moonlight Classic	(France) Céline Boutier	Won with birdie on first extra hole
2	2021	Amundi Evian Championship	(South Korea) Lee Jeong-eun	Won with birdie on first extra hole

=== ALPG Tour wins (2) ===
No.	Date	Tournament	Winning score	To par	Margin of victory	Runner(s)-up
1	23 Feb 2014	Oates Vic Open^{a}	73-70-68-68=279	−16	6 strokes	(Scotland) Vikki Laing
2	4 Feb 2018	Oates Vic Open^{[4]}	70-67-75-67=279	−13	5 strokes	(Australia) Karis Davidson

^{a} Lee won the 2014 Oates Vic Open as an amateur.
^{4} Co-sanctioned by the Ladies European Tour.

== Major championships ==
=== Wins (3) ===
Year	Championship	54 holes	Winning score	Margin	Runner(s)-up
2021	The Evian Championship	7 shot deficit	–18 (68-69-65-64=266)	Playoff	(South Korea) Lee Jeong-eun
2022	U.S. Women's Open	3 shot lead	–13 (67-66-67-71=271)	4 strokes	(United States) Mina Harigae
2025	Women's PGA Championship	4 shot lead	–4 (69-72-69-74=284)	3 strokes	(United States) Auston Kim (Thailand) Chanettee Wannasaen

=== Results timeline ===
Results not in chronological order.

Tournament	2014	2015	2016	2017	2018	2019	2020	2021	2022	2023	2024	2025	2026
Chevron Championship	T24LA	CUT	T26	T3	T25	T21	T7	T25	12	T41	CUT	T14	T49
U.S. Women's Open	T22	CUT	T46	T11	T34	T12	T46	T54	1	T13	T9	T22	T28
Women's PGA Championship		T13	T12	T36	T25	T30	T58	T40	T2	T20	T24	1	CUT
The Evian Championship	T16	T11	T67	T32	T16	CUT	NT	1	T43	T16	T49	T3	CUT
Women's British Open	CUT	T9	T25	CUT	10	T11	3	T5	T4	T50	CUT	T13	CUT

Win
Top 10
Did not play

LA = low amateur
CUT = missed the half-way cut
NT = no tournament
"T" = tied

=== Summary ===
Tournament	Wins	2nd	3rd	Top-5	Top-10	Top-25	Events	Cuts made
Chevron Championship	0	0	1	1	2	7	12	10
U.S. Women's Open	1	0	0	1	2	7	13	12
Women's PGA Championship	1	1	0	2	2	7	12	11
The Evian Championship	1	0	1	2	2	6	12	10
Women's British Open	0	0	1	3	5	8	13	9
Totals	3	1	3	9	13	35	62	52

- Most consecutive cuts made – 20 (2019 British – 2023 British)
- Longest streak of top-10s – 2 (four times)

== LPGA Tour career summary ==
Year	Tournaments played	Cuts made	Wins	2nd	3rd	Top 10s	Best finish	Earnings ($)	Money list rank	Scoring average	Scoring rank
2013	1	1	0	0	0	0	T55	n/a	n/a	72.25	n/a
2014	6	5	0	0	0	0	T11	n/a	n/a	71.77	n/a
2015	29	24	1	0	0	7	1	821,121	16	70.89	15
2016	27	26	2	1	0	8	1	1,213,902	12	70.42	13
2017	26	22	0	1	3	10	T2	1,027,941	16	70.18	15
2018	27	25	1	3	2	13	1	1,551,032	2	69.75	2
2019	26	24	1	4	2	9	1	1,522,607	8	69.91	9
2020	16	16	0	0	2	5	3	724,273	8	70.71	11
2021	18	16	1	1	0	7	1	1,542,332	4	70.32	22
2022	20	18	2	2	1	6	1	3,809,960	2	69.69	7
2023	18	18	2	1	0	5	1	1,650,975	12	70.42	21
2024	21	16	0	0	0	4	T4	881,946	43	71.22	49
2025	22	21	1	2	2	8	1	3,910,471	2	69.64	3
2026	7	5			1	2	T3	391,890	46	71.17	29
Totals^	256 (2015)	230 (2015)	12	15	13	81	1	19,048,450	6		

^{^} Official as of 21 June 2026

== World ranking ==
Position in Women's World Golf Rankings at the end of each calendar year.

Year	World ranking	Source
2015	18	
2016	17	
2017	19	
2018	6	
2019	9	
2020	8	
2021	7	
2022	4	
2023	4	
2024	18	
2025	3	
2026	11^	

^ As of 29 June 2026

== Team appearances ==
Amateur

- Espirito Santo Trophy (representing Australia): 2012, 2014 (winners)
- Astor Trophy (representing Australia): 2011
- Queen Sirikit Cup (representing Australia): 2013 (winners)

Professional

- International Crown (representing Australia): 2014 (as an amateur), 2016, 2018, 2023, 2025 (winners)

== See also ==
- List of golfers with most LPGA major championship wins
- List of golfers with most LPGA Tour wins
