= Cheyenne Knight =

American professional golfer (born 1997)

Personal information
- Nationality: United States
- Born: January 22, 1997 (age 29) The Woodlands, Texas, U.S.
- Height: 5 ft 10 in (1.78 m)

Career
- Sport: Golf
- College: University of Alabama
- Turned professional: 2018
- Current tour: LPGA Tour
- Former tour: Symetra Tour
- Professional wins: 2

Number of wins by tour
- LPGA Tour: 2

Best results in LPGA major championships
- Chevron Championship: T18: 2023
- Women's PGA C'ship: T30: 2023
- U.S. Women's Open: T15: 2022
- Women's British Open: T37: 2022
- Evian Championship: T19: 2022

Cheyenne Erin Knight (born January 22, 1997) is an American professional golfer. She played collegiate golf at the University of Alabama where she was a three-time all-American and the 2017 SEC Player of the Year and a member of the Psi chapter of Alpha Gamma Delta. On October 6, 2019, Knight won the Volunteers of America Classic on the LPGA Tour.

== Amateur wins ==
- 2012 KPMG Stacy Lewis Junior Girls Open
- 2013 U.S. Air Force Academy Girls
- 2014 Genesis Shootout
- 2016 Darius Rucker Intercollegiate, Mason Rudolph Championship
- 2017 Darius Rucker Intercollegiate
- 2018 Liz Murphy Collegiate Classic

== Professional wins (2) ==
=== LPGA Tour wins (2) ===
No.	Date	Tournament	Winning score	To par	Margin of victory	Runners-up
1	Oct 6, 2019	Volunteers of America Classic	66-67-67-66=266	−18	2 strokes	(United States) Brittany Altomare (United States) Jaye Marie Green
2	Jul 22, 2023	Dow Great Lakes Bay Invitational (with (United States) Elizabeth Szokol)	69-61-62-65=257	−23	1 stroke	(Finland) Matilda Castren and (Malaysia) Kelly Tan

== Results in LPGA majors ==
Results not in chronological order.

Tournament	2019	2020	2021	2022	2023	2024	2025
Chevron Championship		CUT	CUT	T65	T18	T62	T52
U.S. Women's Open		T30	CUT	T15	T48	75	
Women's PGA Championship	CUT	T69	CUT	T46	T30	T46	CUT
The Evian Championship		NT	T50	T19	T61	CUT	
Women's British Open	T51	T45	CUT	T37	CUT	CUT	

Did not play

CUT = missed the half-way cut
NT = no tournament
T = tied

=== Summary ===
Tournament	Wins	2nd	3rd	Top-5	Top-10	Top-25	Events	Cuts made
Chevron Championship	0	0	0	0	0	1	6	4
U.S. Women's Open	0	0	0	0	0	1	5	4
Women's PGA Championship	0	0	0	0	0	0	7	4
The Evian Championship	0	0	0	0	0	1	4	3
Women's British Open	0	0	0	0	0	0	6	3
Totals	0	0	0	0	0	3	28	18

== LPGA Tour career summary ==
Year	Tournaments played	Cuts made*	Wins	2nd	3rd	Top 10s	Best finish	Earnings ($)	Money list rank	Scoring average	Scoring rank
2016	1	1	0	0	0	0	T29	n/a	n/a	70.75	n/a
2019	22	13	1	0	0	1	1	295,493	65	71.67	80
2020	18	15	0	1	0	2	T2	306,519	36	71.58	42
2021	27	15	0	0	0	1	T5	193,326	86	71.81	87
2022	24	20	0	0	1	3	T3	768,975	38	70.69	33
2023	23	19	1	0	0	5	1	1,002,171	28	70.80	36
2024	25	15	0	0	0	2	T4	315,552	87	72.20	111
2025	12	4	0	0	0	1	T10	92,173	134	73.82	150
Totals^	151 (2019)	101 (2019)	2	1	1	15	1	2,974,209	165		

^ Official as of 2025 season
* Includes matchplay and other tournaments without a cut.

== World ranking ==
Position in Women's World Golf Rankings at the end of each calendar year.

Year	World ranking	Source
2016	647	
2017	n/a	
2018	529	
2019	79	
2020	81	
2021	128	
2022	75	
2023	61	
2024	142	
2025	394	

== Team appearances ==
Professional

- Solheim Cup (representing the United States): 2023

=== Solheim Cup record ===
Year	Total matches	Total W–L–H	Singles W–L–H	Foursomes W–L–H	Fourballs W–L–H	Points won	Points %
Career	3	2–0–1	0–0–1	1–0–0	1–0–0	2.5	83.3
2023	3	2–0–1	0–0–1 halved w/ G. Dryburgh	1–0–0 won w/ A. Ewing 5&4	1–0–0 won w/ A. Yin 2 up	2.5	83.3
