= Thalia Martin =

English professional golfer (born 1996

Personal information
- Nationality: England
- Born: 1996 (age 29–30) Banda Aceh, Indonesia
- Height: 160 cm (5 ft 3 in)

Career
- Sport: Golf
- College: Myerscough College
- Turned professional: 2021
- Current tour: Ladies European Tour (joined 2022)
- Former tours: Sunshine Ladies Tour; LET Access Series (joined 2021)
- Professional wins: 2

Thalia Martin (born 1996) is an English professional golfer and Ladies European Tour player.

== Early life and amateur career ==
Martin was born in Banda Aceh in Indonesia before moving to England at an early age. She began playing golf when she was 12 years old, and represents Peterborough Milton Golf Club.

In 2017, she enrolled at Myerscough College and earned a bachelor's degree while competing on the BUCS (British Universities & Colleges Sport) Tour, where she won two titles. In 2020, she finished top-10 at the English Women's Amateur Championship and reached the match play stage at The Women's Amateur Championship.

== Professional career ==
Martin turned professional in 2021 and joined the LET Access Series, where she tied for 5th in her first tournament, the Golf Flanders LETAS Trophy. She made her Ladies European Tour (LET) debut at the ISPS Handa World Invitational after qualifying as the leading female through the Northern Ireland Open. She finished her rookie season 11th on the LETAS Order of Merit. She joined the LET in 2022, and tied for 7th at the 2024 Lacoste Ladies Open de France.

In 2025, Martin enjoyed her breakthrough year. She won the ABSA Ladies Invitational at Royal Johannesburg & Kensington Golf Club on the Sunshine Ladies Tour, and the Madaëf Golfs Ladies Open in Morocco, following a four-hole playoff against compatriot Charlotte Heath. She also finished 4th at the Hills Ladies Open, an LET in Sweden, three strokes behind winner Meja Örtengren.

== Amateur wins ==
- 2019 BUCS Golf Tour - Northern Tournament
- 2020 BUCS Golf Tour - Exeter Invitational, Northamptonshire Ladies County Championship

== Professional wins (2) ==
=== Sunshine Ladies Tour wins (1) ===
No.	Date	Tournament	Winning score	To par	Margin of victory	Runners-up
1	29 Mar 2025	ABSA Ladies Invitational	69-65-71=205	−11	2 strokes	(Scotland) Laura Beveridge (France) Anne-Charlotte Mora (Norway) Madelene Stavnar

=== LET Access Series wins (1) ===
No.	Date	Tournament	Winning score	To par	Margin of victory	Runner-up
1	27 Apr 2025	Madaëf Golfs Ladies Open	74-69-71=214	−2	Playoff	(England) Charlotte Heath

Playoff record (1–0)

No.	Year	Tournament	Opponent	Result
1	2025	Madaëf Golfs Ladies Open	(England) Charlotte Heath	Won with par on fourth extra hole
