= Ana Dawson =

Manx professional golfer (born c. 2001)

Personal information
- Nationality: Isle of Man
- Born: 2001 (age 24–25) Douglas, Isle of Man
- Height: 175 cm (5 ft 9 in)

Career
- Sport: Golf
- College: University of Memphis
- Turned professional: 2022
- Current tour: Ladies European Tour (joined 2023)
- Former tours: Sunshine Ladies Tour (joined 2024); LET Access Series (joined 2024)
- Professional wins: 1
Medal record
Island Games
Silver medal – second place	2015 Jersey	Women's team

Ana Dawson (born c. 2001) is a professional golfer from the Isle of Man who plays on the Ladies European Tour.

== Early life and amateur career ==
Dawson was born in Douglas, Isle of Man and learned the game at Peel Golf Club in Peel, Isle of Man along with her younger sisters, before becoming attached to The Belfry in England in 2024.

Dawson attended the University of Memphis from 2018 to 2022 and played with the Memphis Tigers women's golf team, where she was a WGCA All-American Scholar.

Returning to Europe after graduation she won several tournaments, including the Faldo Series Wales Girls Championship and the Faldo Series Grand Final in the United Arab Emirates.

== Professional career ==
Dawson turned professional in late 2022 and joined the 2023 Ladies European Tour, after securing Category 16 membership by finishing tied 31st at Q-School. She finished her rookie season 142nd in the Order of Merit, and played on the LET Access Series in 2024, where she finished 3rd at the Ahlsell Trophy. In 2025, she finished top-5 four times and finished 22nd in the LETAS season rankings.

Dawson played on the 2024 Sunshine Ladies Tour, where she led the Dimension Data Ladies Pro-Am after the first two rounds, and ultimately tied for 3rd. She captured the event's team trophy six strokes ahead of Kylie Henry.

She earned full status for the 2026 Ladies European Tour by finishing tied 16th at Q-School.

== Amateur wins ==
- 2022 The Comboy Leveret, Faldo Series Wales Girls Championship, Faldo Series Grand Final

== Professional wins (1) ==
=== Other wins (1) ===
Date	Tournament	Score	Margin of victory	Runners-up
18 Feb 2024	Dimension Data Ladies Pro-Am Team Trophy with Theresa Shindehutte (a)	−16 (64-66-70=200)	6 strokes	(Scotland) Kylie Henry & Max Mofokeng (a)
