= Tina Mazarino =

Danish professional golfer

Personal information
- Nationality: Norway
- Born: 18 July 2000 (age 26)
- Height: 160 cm (5 ft 3 in)

Career
- Sport: Golf
- Turned professional: 2019
- Current tour: Ladies European Tour (joined 2025)
- Former tours: LET Access Series (joined 2021); Swedish Golf Tour (joined 2019); Sunshine Ladies Tour
- Professional wins: 1

Tina Mazarino (born 18 July 2000) is a Norwegian professional golfer and Ladies European Tour player. She won the 2024 Ladies Slovak Golf Open.

== Amateur career ==
Mazarino started playing golf in 2007 at the age of six, encouraged by her golfing father Per. She started playing international tournaments when she was 10, and was runner-up at the U.S. Kids Golf European Championship in Scotland. She has trained at Kjekstad Golf Club in Norway and Atalaya Golf & Country Club in Málaga, Spain.

At 16, Mazarino won the final of the 2017 Norwegian National Match Play Championship against Renate Grimstad.

She appeared twice for her national team at the European Girls' Team Championship.

== Professional career ==
Mazarino turned professional in 2019, at 18, and joined the Swedish Golf Tour. In 2021, she joined the LET Access Series, where she finished solo 4th at the Golf Flanders LETAS Trophy in her first start.

On the 2024 Sunshine Ladies Tour, Mazarino shot a final round 65 at the Fidelity ADT Ladies Challenge to force a playoff with Helen Tamy Kreuzer of Germany.

In 2024, Mazarino won her maiden LETAS title after she birdied the final three holes to secure a three-stroke victory at the Ladies Slovak Golf Open. She finished 4th in the season rankings to earn promotion to the 2025 Ladies European Tour.

== Amateur wins ==
- 2017 Norwegian National Match Play Championship

== Professional wins (1) ==
=== LET Access Series (1) ===
No.	Date	Tournament	Winning score	To par	Margin of victory	Runners-up
1	24 Aug 2024	Ladies Slovak Golf Open	70-70-70=210	−6	3 strokes	(Slovakia) Michaela Vávrová (New Zealand) Wenyung Keh

== Playoff record ==
Sunshine Ladies Tour playoff record (0–1)

No.	Year	Tournament	Opponent	Result
1	2024	Fidelity ADT Ladies Challenge	(Germany) Helen Tamy Kreuzer	Lost to birdie on first extra hole

== Team appearances ==
Amateur

- European Girls' Team Championship (representing Norway): 2017, 2018
