= Ladies German Challenge =

Golf tournament

Tournament information
- Location: Wuppertal, Germany
- Course: Golf-Club Bergisch Land
- Par: 72
- Tour: LET Access Series
- Format: 54-hole Stroke play
- Prize fund: €70,000
- Month played: June

Tournament record score
- Aggregate: 202 Laura Murray
- To par: –14 as above

Current champion
- (Sweden) Moa Svedenskiöld

Location map
- Location in Germany Location in North Rhine-Westphalia

The Ladies German Challenge is a women's professional golf tournament on the LET Access Series, held in Germany.

== History ==
The first LET Access Series in Germany was held at the Treudelberg Golf & Country Club near Hamburg in 2015, and was won by Krista Bakker of Finland. Four years later the tour returned at Golf Club am Meer near Oldenburg, where Laura Murray of Scotland won. In 2026 it is staged at Golf-Club Bergisch Land, near Wuppertal in North Rhine-Westphalia.

== Winners ==
Year	Winner	Country	Score	Margin of victory	Runner(s)-up	Prize fund (€)	Venue
Ladies German Challenge
2026	Moa Svedenskiöld	Sweden	−9 (69-68-70=207)	2 strokes	(France) Lauren Holmey (England) Bel Wardle	70,000	Golf-Club Bergisch Land
2020–2025: No tournament
Rügenwalder Mühle Ladies Open
2019	Laura Murray	Scotland	−14 (64-68-70=202)	2 strokes	(France) Marie Fourquier	40,000	Golf Club am Meer
2016–2018: No tournament
Creditgate24 GolfSeries Hamburg Open
2015	Krista Bakker	Finland	−9 (67-70-70=207)	3 strokes	(France) Emilie Piquot	50,000	Treudelberg G&CC

== See also ==
- Ladies German Open
- German Challenge
