= Ladies Tshwane Open =

Golf tournament on the Sunshine Ladies Tour in South Africa

Platinum Ladies Open
Tournament information
- Location: Pretoria, Tshwane, South Africa
- Established: 2014
- Course: Blair Atholl Golf
- Par: 72
- Tour: Sunshine Ladies Tour
- Format: Stroke play
- Prize fund: R 1,200,000
- Month played: February/March

Tournament record score
- Aggregate: 198 Kiera Floyd
- To par: −16 Gabrielle Venter

Current champion
- (South Africa) Gabrielle Venter

Location map
- Location in South Africa Location in Gauteng

The Platinum Ladies Open is a women's professional golf tournament held near Pretoria, Tshwane, South Africa. It is an event on the South Africa-based Sunshine Ladies Tour since 2014.

== Winners ==
| Year | Venue | Winner | Score | Margin of victory | Runner(s)-up | Note |
Platinum Ladies Open
| 2026 | Blair Atholl Golf | (South Africa) Gabrielle Venter | −16 (69-65-66=200) | playoff | (Norway) Madelene Stavnar | |
| 2025 | Blair Atholl Golf | (South Africa) Kiera Floyd | −15 (71-67-60=198) | 1 stroke | (England) Hayley Davis | |
Fidelity ADT Ladies Challenge
| 2024 | Blue Valley Golf | (Germany) Helen Kreuzer | −12 (70-68-66=204) | Playoff | (Norway) Tina Mazarino | |
2020-2023: No tournament
Canon Sunshine Ladies Tour Open
| 2019 | Irene Country Club | (South Africa) Ashleigh Buhai (2) | −8 (67-68-73=208) | 4 strokes | (South Africa) Stacy Bregman | |
Canon Ladies Tshwane Open
| 2018 | Pretoria Country Club | (South Africa) Stacy Bregman | −4 (71-70-71=212) | 4 strokes | (South Africa) Ashleigh Buhai | |
Ladies Tshwane Open
| 2017 | Zwartkop Country Club | (England) Kiran Matharu | −9 (68-69-67=204) | 5 strokes | (South Africa) Ashleigh Buhai (South Africa) Monique Smit | |
| 2016 | Zwartkop Country Club | (South Africa) Monique Smit | −9 (69-67-68=204) | Playoff | (South Africa) Ashleigh Buhai | |
| 2015 | Pretoria Country Club | (South Africa) Lee-Anne Pace | −4 (140) | 5 strokes | (South Africa) Melissa Eaton | |
| 2014 | Els Club at Copperleaf | (South Africa) Ashleigh Simon | −6 (66) | 4 strokes | (Norway) Cecilie Lundgreen | |

== See also ==
- Tshwane Open
