= Super Bock Ladies Open =

Professional golf tournament

Tournament information
- Location: Vidago, Portugal
- Established: 2025
- Course: Vidago Palace Golf
- Par: 72
- Tour: LET Access Series
- Format: 54-hole Stroke play
- Prize fund: €50,000
- Month played: May

Tournament record score
- Aggregate: 204 Sara Brentcheneff
- To par: –12 as above

Current champion
- (England) Ellie Gower

Location map
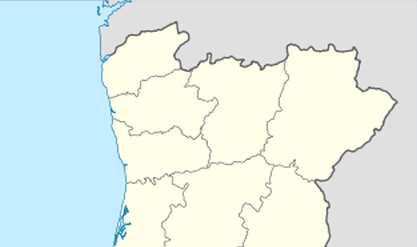
- Location in Portugal Location in Norte

The Super Bock Ladies Open is a women's professional golf tournament on the LET Access Series, first held in 2025 in the municipality of Chaves, Portugal.

The tournament marked the return of the LET Access Series to Portugal after the Azores Ladies Open was discontinued after 2017. Sponsored by the Super Bock Group, the event is hosted at the group's Vidago Palace Hotel.

== Winners ==
Year	Winner	Country	Score	Margin of victory	Runner-up	Ref
2026	Ellie Gower	England	−8 (70-71-67=208)	2 strokes	(England) Billie-Jo Smith	
2025	Sara Brentcheneff (a)	France	−12 (68-69-67=204)	2 strokes	(Norway) Madelene Stavnar	
