= Cal State San Marcos Cougars =

California State University, San Marcos athletic teams

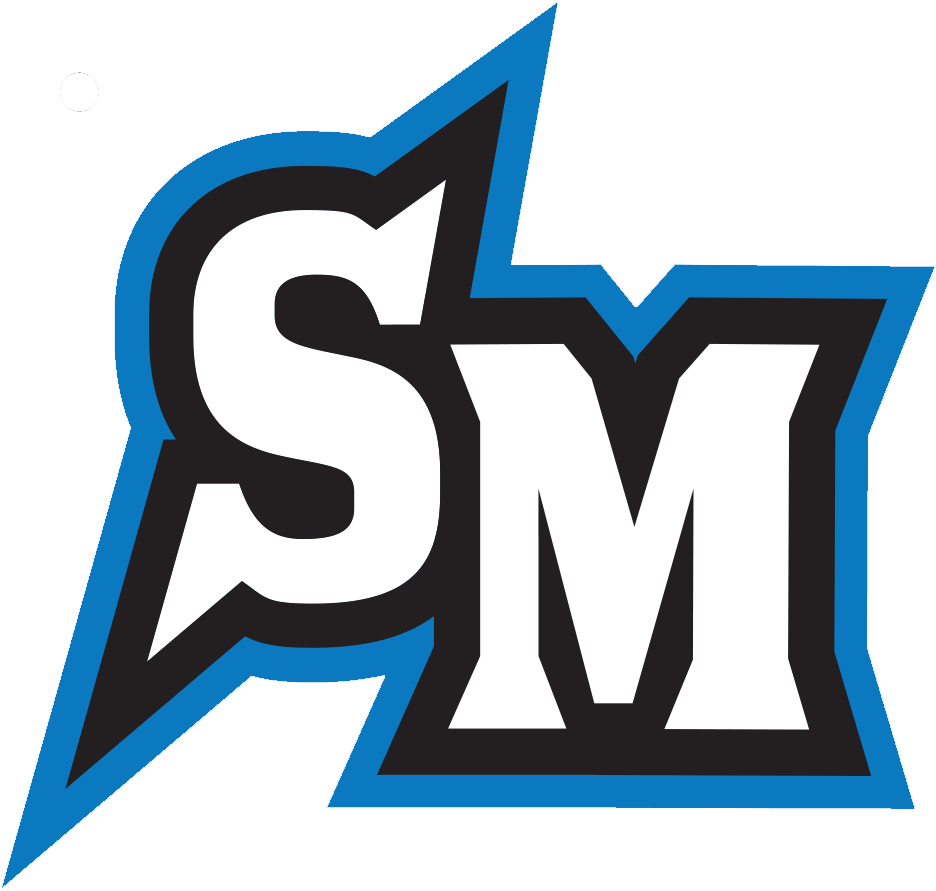
- University: California State University, San Marcos
- Nickname: Cougars
- NCAA: Division II
- Conference: CCAA (primary)
- Athletic director: Morod Shah
- Location: San Marcos, California
- First season: 1998
- Varsity teams: 14 (6 men's, 8 women's)
- Basketball arena: The Sports Center
- Baseball stadium: CSUSM Baseball Field
- Softball stadium: CSUSM Softball Field
- Soccer stadium: The Cage
- Other venues: Mangrum Track & Field
- Colors: Medium blue and white
- Mascot: Crash the Cougar
- Website: csusmcougars.com

The Cal State San Marcos Cougars are the intercollegiate athletic teams that represent California State University, San Marcos. The Cougars compete in NCAA Division II as a member of the California Collegiate Athletic Association (CCAA).

== History ==
The Cougars previously competed as an NAIA Independent within the Association of Independent Institutions (AII) of the National Association of Intercollegiate Athletics (NAIA) from 1998–99 (when the school began its athletics program and joined the NAIA) to 2014–15.

In baseball, the school has Dennis Pugh, who coached at a local high school for decades, and for soccer coach Ron Pulvers. In 2007, the school hired former UCLA All-American Kelly Warren who was previously the Associate Head Coach at fellow San Diego County CSU, San Diego State University.

The school also has women's volleyball, and men's and women's basketball.

As of 2012, the Athletic Program has so far dominated the A.I.I. conference by having 6 teams emerge as conference champions.

== Mascot ==
The original mascot of the campus was Tukwut, the name for the California mountain lion in the Luiseño language of the local Native American Luiseño people. However, the mascot was "dropped for something with more ring," and in a referendum students selected "cougar" over "mountain lion." The dropping of the indigenous word was criticized by a faculty member at CSU San Marcos.

== National championships ==
=== Team ===
Sport	Association	Division	Year	Opponent/Runner-up	Score
Women's cross country (3)	NAIA	Single	2009	Biola	137–140
Women's cross country (3)	NAIA	Single	2010	Biola	88–127
Women's cross country (3)	NAIA	Single	2011	Azusa Pacific	82–91

=== Individual ===
Sport	Association	Division	Year	Individual	Opponent/Runner-up	Score
Women's golf (1)	NCAA	II	2025	Madison Murr	Gracie Grant / Dallas Baptist	202 (−14)

== Accomplishments ==
Cal State San Marcos leads as of 2020 in the Women's Golf CCAA Championships and was the runner-up in the 2019 NCAA Division II Women's Golf Championship.

== Varsity teams ==
CSUSM competes in 14 intercollegiate varsity sports: Men's sports include baseball, basketball, cross country, golf, soccer and track & field (outdoor only); while women's sports include basketball, cross country, golf, soccer, softball, track & field (indoor and outdoor) and volleyball. Former sports included cheerleading and dance.

Men's sports	Women's sports
Baseball	Basketball
Basketball	Cross country
Cross country	Golf
Golf	Soccer
Soccer	Softball
Track and field	Track and field^{†}
	Volleyball
† – Track and field includes both indoor and outdoor.

=== Men's basketball ===
Jim Saia was the first men's basketball head coach, who led the team to the NAIA Division I National Championship Tournament in 2012–2013.

=== Women's basketball ===
In 2010, Cal State San Marcos hired former Palomar College head coach, Sheri Jennum, as their women's basketball head coach.

=== Cross country ===
Track athlete Steve Scott was the Cougars' cross country and track & field coach for 20 years. They train and/or compete on the Mangrum Track and Field when outdoors. In fall 2009, the women's cross country team won their first NAIA National Championship. They went on to defend their title the next year in fall 2010.

== Championships ==
=== Appearances ===
The Cal State San Marcos Cougars competed in the NCAA Tournament across 2 active sports (2 women's) 2 times at the Division II level.

- Women's cross country (1): 2017 (Team)
- Women's outdoor track and field (2): 2018 (Individual), 2019 (Individual)
- Women's golf (1): 2019 (Team)
