= Sara Brentcheneff =

French professional golfer (born 2007)

Personal information
- Nationality: France
- Born: 11 July 2007 (age 19) Vienne, France

Career
- Sport: Golf
- Status: Amateur
- Professional wins: 1

Sara Brentcheneff (born 11 July 2007) is a French amateur golfer. She won the 2025 Super Bock Ladies Open, and was runner-up at the French Ladies Amateur, Spanish Ladies Amateur, Portuguese Ladies Amateur and Terre Blanche Ladies Open (twice) before turning 18.

== Early life and amateur career ==
Brentcheneff was born in Vienne, grew up in Annonay, and came to represent Golf Club de Lyon in Villette-d'Anthon. She swam competitively in her younger years.

Brentcheneff broke through competitively in 2022 at age 15, and won the Championnat de France Minimes & Cadets in 2022 and 2024. In 2023, she won the Swiss Golf International Championship and the Spanish International Stroke Play Championship, after rounds of 68-65-70, to finish five strokes ahead of runner-up Alba González Fernández of Spain.

In 2024, Brentcheneff was runner-up at the French International Ladies Amateur Championship, and lost the final of the Spanish International Ladies Amateur Championship, 2 and 1, to Spain's Andrea Revuelta. The next year she was a semi-finalist in the same event. In 2025, she was runner-up at the Portuguese International Ladies Amateur Championship, two strokes behind compatriot Louise Uma Landgraf.

Brentcheneff made her Ladies European Tour debut at 15 in the 2023 Lalla Meryem Cup, and made her first LET cut at the 2024 Jabra Ladies Open, held at the Evian Resort Golf Club. She was runner-up at the Terre Blanche Ladies Open, an LET Access Series event, in 2024 and 2025, before winning the 2025 Super Bock Ladies Open in Portugal, two strokes ahead of Madelene Stavnar.

She plans to forgo college, and aim to turn professional at the end of 2026.

== Amateur wins ==
- 2022 Grand Prix de l'Isere, Grand Prix de Haute Savoie, Grand Prix de Seignosse, Grand Prix De Chiberta, Grand Prix De La Bresse, Grand Prix de Vichy, Grand Prix de la Ligue Aura, Championnat de France Minimes & Cadets
- 2023 Grand Prix de L'Isere, Grand Prix De Chiberta, Swiss Golf International Championship, Spanish International Stroke Play Championship
- 2024 Championnat de France Minimes & Cadets

== Professional wins (1) ==
=== LET Access Series wins (1) ===
No.	Date	Tournament	Winning score	To par	Margin of victory	Runner-up
1	8 May 2025	Super Bock Ladies Open (as an amateur)	68-69-67=204	−12	2 strokes	(Norway) Madelene Stavnar

== Team appearances ==
Amateur

- European Girls' Team Championship (representing France):2024
- Junior Solheim Cup (representing Europe): 2024
- World Junior Girls Championship (representing France): 2024
- Espirito Santo Trophy (representing France): 2025
- Vagliano Trophy (representing the Continent of Europe): 2025
- European Ladies' Team Championship (representing France): 2025, 2026
- Junior Ryder Cup (representing Europe): 2025
