= Jacqueline Hedwall =

Swedish professional golfer (born 1989)

Personal information
- Full name: Jacqueline Ingrid Hedwall
- Nationality: Sweden
- Born: 13 May 1989 (age 37) Täby, Sweden
- Height: 5 ft 7 in (1.70 m)

Career
- Sport: Golf
- College: Louisiana State University
- Turned professional: 2012
- Former tour: LET (joined 2013)

Achievements and awards
- LSWA Freshman of the Year: 2009

Jacqueline Ingrid Hedwall (born 13 May 1989) is a Swedish professional golfer and caddie who played briefly on the Ladies European Tour (LET). As an amateur, she won the Junior Solheim Cup, the European Girls' Team Championship, and the European Ladies' Team Championship (twice) together with her twin sister, Caroline Hedwall.

== Early years and amateur career ==
Hedwall started to play golf at age eight, living in Täby outside Stockholm, Sweden, and moved with her family to Löddeköpinge at age 15. She has a fraternal twin sister, Caroline Hedwall, who is an accomplished professional golfer that has played in the Solheim Cup four times.

Hedwall enjoyed a successful amateur career and was on the National Team. At the 2007 Junior Solheim Cup, the Hedwall sisters both played on the winning European team. The Hedwall twins were also part of the winning Swedish teams at the 2007 European Girls' Team Championship, and at the 2008 and 2010 European Ladies' Team Championship.

Hedwall was runner up at the Swedish Junior Strokeplay Championship in 2006 and 2007, losing a playoff for the title to her sister in 2006. She was a semi-finalist at the British Ladies Amateur in 2008, where her sister was a finalist. She was runner-up at the 2008 Helen Holm Scottish Women's Open Championship and had the best round of the closing day, a bogey-free, eight-birdie round of 67 at Royal Troon for a total 216, three strokes ahead of her sister at 219.

She did not join her sister in winning the 2008 Espirito Santo Trophy, having been edged out of the three-man team by future major winners Pernilla Lindberg and Anna Nordqvist.

Making a few starts on the Swedish Golf Tour as an amateur, she was runner-up at the 2007 Ekerum Ladies Masters one stroke behind Marianne Skarpnord and runner-up at the 2008 Telenor Masters at Barsebäck, two strokes behind her sister. The SEK 60,000 first prize check at the Telenor Masters went to third placed Sarah Heath, England, as the Hedwall twins were amateurs. Hedwall also finished second at the 2010 Swedish PGA Championship after losing a playoff to Johanna Johansson.

Hedwall accepted a golf scholarship to Louisiana State University in 2008, unlike her sister who turned down LSU to attend Oklahoma State. In 2009, she was LSWA Freshman of the Year, and she helped lead the LSU Tigers team to two consecutive third place finishes in the NCAA Women's Golf Championships in 2011 and 2012.

== Professional career ==
Hedwall turned professional in 2012 and earned conditional status for the 2013 Ladies European Tour where she made three cuts in six starts, with a best finish of T22 at the Lalla Meryem Cup. After a stint on the ALPG Tour she retired from tournament golf in early 2014.

She caddied regularly for her sister between 2011 and 2015, including at the 2011 Solheim Cup, where she helped her sister win the cup for Europe for the first time since 2003.

== Amateur wins ==
- 2004 Drottningholms 36:an
- 2006 Skandia Tour Riks #5 - Stockholm
- 2007 Skandia Tour Elit Flickor #1

== Team appearances ==
Amateur

- Junior Solheim Cup (representing Europe): 2007 (winners)
- European Girls' Team Championship (representing Sweden): 2007 (winners)
- European Ladies' Team Championship (representing Sweden): 2008 (winners), 2009, 2010 (winners)
