= Ishmael Awange =

Kenyan basketball player (born 1989)

Personal information
- Born: April 3, 1989 (age 37) Nairobi, Kenya
- Listed height: 6 ft 11 in (2.11 m)
- Listed weight: 240 lb (109 kg)

Career information
- High school: Aquinas (La Crosse, Wisconsin)
- College: UT Arlington (2008–2010); Dallas Baptist (2011–2012)
- NBA draft: 2012: undrafted
- Position: Center

Ishmael Awange (born April 3, 1989) is a Kenyan basketball player. He played college basketball for the UT Arlington Mavericks and the Dallas Baptist Patriots. Awange has also played for the Kenyan national basketball team.

== College career ==
2008-10 University Of Texas Arlington Appeared in 65 games, scored 180 points and grabbed 150 rebounds on the season...career-high 18 points in 32 minutes at Michigan State University along with a career-high 8 rebounds ... 2010-2012 Dallas Baptist University Finished the 2012 season with a four losing streak loss but managed to grab 10 rebounds and scored career high 16 points to help secure an NCCAA title against Spring Arbor University in 2011. Prior to University of Texas Arlington and Dallas Baptist University Ishmael Awange Played for the Kenyan national team and the Mennonites club. Traveled with the African Global Games team that competed in the United States during the summer of 2007...averaged 15 rebounds per game in high school and shot 70 percent from the field. Had 16 points and 18 rebounds in a 2005 game against Laiser Hill...2005 District Defensive Player of the Year at Aquinas High School.

== International career ==
Played with the Mennonites Basketball Club where he helped them to secure a title. China tryouts October 2012. Graduating from Dallas Baptist University. Awange has attended some pro teams and due to a shoulder injury he has opted out for the season.
