= Malene Jørgensen =

Danish professional golfer

Personal information
- Nationality: Denmark
- Born: 30 July 1986 (age 40) Odense, Denmark
- Height: 170 cm (5 ft 7 in)

Career
- Sport: Golf
- Turned professional: 2009
- Former tour: Ladies European Tour (joined 2009)

Best results in LPGA major championships
- Chevron Championship: DNP
- Women's PGA C'ship: DNP
- U.S. Women's Open: DNP
- Women's British Open: T25: 2013
- Evian Championship: DNP

Malene Jørgensen (born 30 July 1986) is a Danish professional golfer who played on the Ladies European Tour between 2009 and 2016. She was runner-up in the Dutch Ladies Open, Turkish Ladies Open and Hero Women's Indian Open.

== Early life and amateur career ==
Jørgensen started playing golf at age 9 with her family, encouraged by her 6 years older brother Michael Jørgensen, a professional golfer and Challenge Tour player. She represented Odense Eventyr Golf Club.

Jørgensen was a member of the Danish National Team between 2002 and 2008. She represented Denmark at the 2008 European Ladies' Team Championship where Denmark finished fifth and at the 2008 Espirito Santo Trophy in Adelaide, Australia, where Denmark tied for 8th place.

== Professional career ==
Jørgensen turned professional in January 2009 and joined the Ladies European Tour. In her rookie year, she finished inside the top 80 in the rankings, to keep her full card. She finished 48th on the Order of Merit in 2010 and 56th in 2011, but had to return to Q-School to keep her card after finishing 100th in 2012.

She represented Denmark at the 2011 European Nations Cup with Iben Tinning, replacing Lisa Holm Sørensen.

Jørgensen's game improved, and in 2013 she made the cut at the Women's British Open. In May 2014, she hit the best form of her career, and was runner-up at the Turkish Airlines Ladies Open, and the following week lost a playoff to Kylie Henry at the Deloitte Ladies Open. In 2015, she finished third at the Helsingborg Open and Lacoste Ladies Open de France, and recorded another runner-up finish at the Hero Women's Indian Open, losing by one stroke to compatriot Emily Kristine Pedersen.

She finished 15th on the LET Order of Merit in 2014, 16th in 2015, and 18th in 2016. After taking 2017 off for maternity leave, Jørgensen did not return to tour.

== Amateur wins ==
- 2006 Danish Amateur Strokeplay Championship, Danish Amateur Matchplay Championship
- 2008 Danish Amateur Strokeplay Championship, Danish International Ladies Amateur Championship

== Playoff record ==
LET playoff record (0–1)

No.	Year	Tournament	Opponents	Result
1	2014	Deloitte Ladies Open	(Australia) Nikki Campbell, (Scotland) Kylie Henry	Henry won with birdie on first extra hole

== Results in LPGA majors ==
Tournament	2010	2011	2012	2013	2014
Women's British Open	CUT	CUT		T25	CUT

Did not play

CUT = missed the half-way cut
"T" = tied

== Team appearances ==
Amateur

- European Ladies' Team Championship (representing Denmark): 2008
- Espirito Santo Trophy (representing Denmark): 2008

Professional

- European Nations Cup (representing Denmark): 2011
