= Michaela Vávrová (golfer) =

Slovak professional golfer (born 2000)

Personal information
- Nickname: Miska
- Nationality: Slovakia
- Born: 10 October 2000 (age 26) Bratislava, Slovakia

Career
- Sport: Golf
- College: University of Nebraska–Lincoln
- Turned professional: 2024
- Current tour: LET Access Series (joined 2024)
- Professional wins: 1

Achievements and awards
- Big Ten Conference Sportsmanship Award: 2024

Michaela Vávrová (born 10 October 2000) is a Slovak professional golfer. She won the 2026 Ladies Slovak Golf Open, and is the most successful Slovak golfer after Zuzana Kamasová.

== Early life and amateur career ==
Vávrová was intoruced to golf by her grandfather when she was 10 years old. She joined the Slovak National Team in 2016.

She represented Slovakia at the 2022 Espirito Santo Trophy and the European Ladies' Team Championship five times. Individually, she was runner-up at the 2021 Austrian International Amateur and won the 2023 Slovak Amateur Championship.

Vávrová attended the University of Nebraska–Lincoln from 2020 to 2024. Playing for the Nebraska Cornhuskers women's golf team she won the 2021 Stampede at the Creek and received the 2024 Big Ten Sportsmanship Award.

== Professional career ==
Vávrová turned professional in July 2024. She joined the LET Access Series mid-season, where she was runner-up at the 2024 Ladies Slovak Golf Open held at Golf Club Tále, her home club, three strokes behind Tina Mazarino. In 2026, she won the event, after prevailing in a playoff against Lauren Holmey. She also tied for 3rd at the Calatayud Ladies Open in Spain.

In 2026, she made her first start as a professional in a Ladies European Tour event at the Czech Ladies Open, where she tied for 12th.

== Amateur wins ==
- 2019 Slovak Amateur Junior Tour I, Slovak Amateur Junior Tour III
- 2020 GCAA Amateur Series – Colorado
- 2021 Stampede at the Creek
- 2022 Slovak Clubs Championship
- 2023 Slovak Amateur Championship

== Professional wins (1) ==
=== LET Access Series (1) ===
No.	Date	Tournament	Winning score	To par	Margin of victory	Runner-up
1	14 Aug 2026	Ladies Slovak Golf Open	71-72-74=217	+1	Playoff	(Netherlands) Lauren Holmey

LET Access Series playoff record (1–0)

No.	Year	Tournament	Opponent	Result
1	2026	Ladies Slovak Golf Open	(Netherlands) Lauren Holmey	Won with birdie on second extra hole

== Team appearances ==
Amateur

- European Girls' Team Championship (representing Slovakia): 2018
- European Ladies' Team Championship (representing Slovakia): 2019, 2021, 2022, 2023, 2024
- Espirito Santo Trophy (representing Slovakia): 2022
