= Golf at the 2015 Island Games =

Golf event in Jersey

Golf at the 2015 Island Games took place between 30 June and 3 July at La Moye Golf Club and Royal Jersey Golf Club, Jersey.

== Medal table ==
* Host nation (Jersey)

Rank	Nation	Gold	Silver	Bronze	Total
1	Isle of Man	2	1	0	3
2	Jersey*	1	2	1	4
3	Guernsey	1	1	2	4
4	Bermuda	0	0	1	1
Totals (4 entries)		4	4	4	12

== Results ==
Event	Gold		Silver		Bronze	
Men's Individual	Tom Harris (IOM)	280	Gavin O'Neill (JEY)	282	Robert Eggo (GGY)	289
Ladies Individual	Aimee Ponte (GGY)	303	Flora Keites (JEY)	312	Jennifer Deeley (JEY)	314
Men's Team Event	Isle of Man; Daryl Callister; Tom Gandy; Tom Harris; Kevin Moore	862	Guernsey; Daniel Blondel; Andrew Eggo; Robert Eggo; Steve Mahy	872	Bermuda; Jarryd Dillas; Will Haddrell; Damian Palanyandi; Mark Phillips	878
Ladies' Team Event	Jersey; Jennifer Deeley; Flora Keites; Hannah Scriven; Frances Shaw	953	Isle of Man; Ana Dawson; Kayleigh Dawson; Emma Harris; Christina Skelly	981	Guernsey; Di Aitchison; Veronica Bougourd; Kay Mapley; Aimee Ponte	995
