= Line Vedel Hansen =

Danish professional golfer

Line Vedel
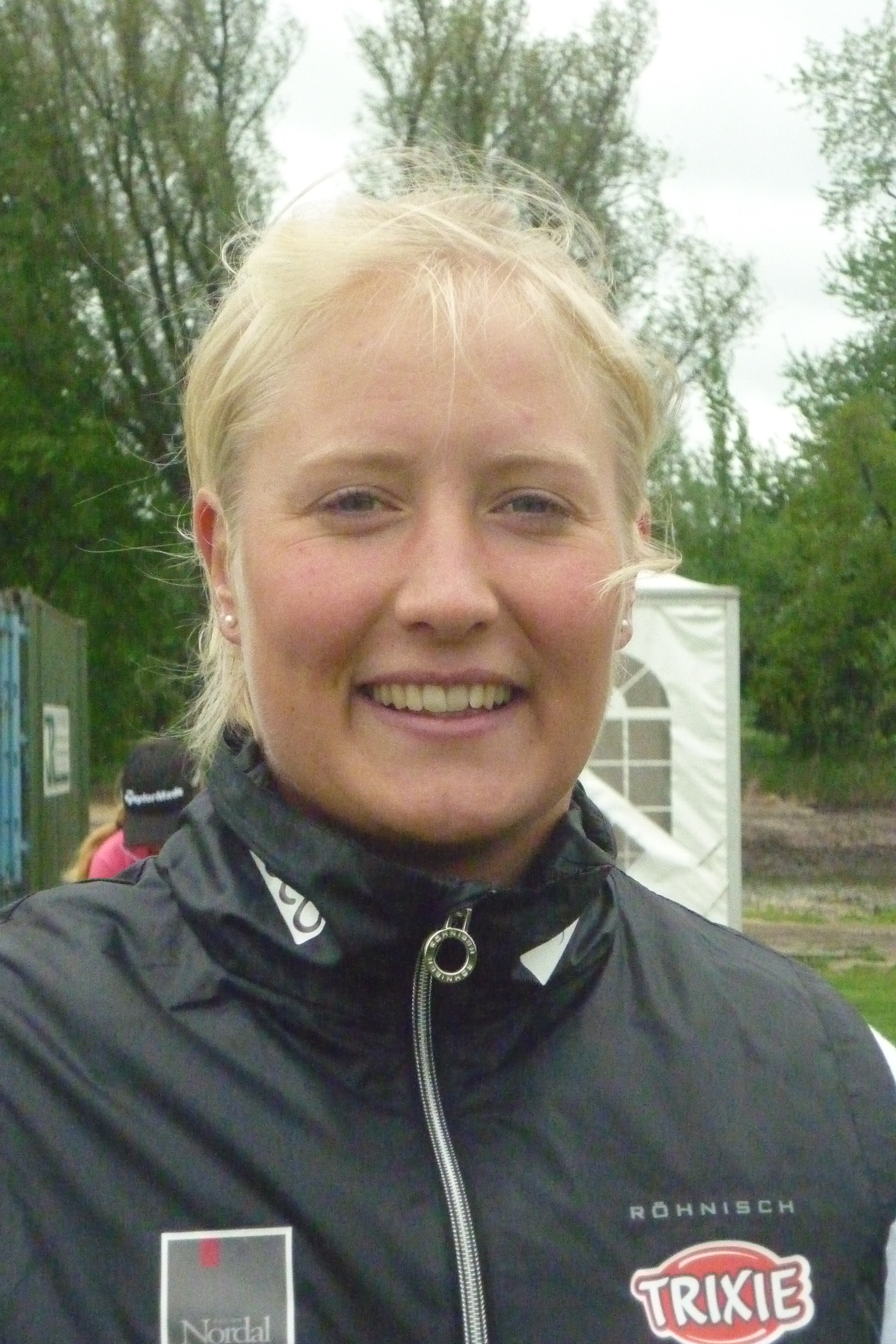

Personal information
- Full name: Line Vedel Hansen
- Nationality: Denmark
- Born: 4 March 1989 (age 37) Varde, Denmark

Career
- Sport: Golf
- Turned professional: 2011
- Former tours: LPGA Tour (2014–2015); Ladies European Tour (2011–2013)
- Professional wins: 2

Number of wins by tour
- Ladies European Tour: 1
- Other: 1

Best results in LPGA major championships
- Chevron Championship: CUT: 2014
- Women's PGA C'ship: CUT: 2014
- U.S. Women's Open: CUT: 2015
- Women's British Open: T33: 2012
- Evian Championship: T61: 2014

Line Vedel Hansen (born 4 March 1989) is a retired Danish professional golfer who played on the Ladies European Tour and LPGA Tour between 2011 and 2015. She won the 2012 Ladies Slovak Open.

== Amateur career ==
Vedel Hansen started playing golf at Haderslev Golfklub as a nine year old, as her parents had a house adjoining the golf course. She was the girl club champion in 2001, 2003, and 2004, and the ladies club champion in 2003, 2005, and 2006. She enjoyed a successful amateur career, including a runner-up position at the 2010 European Ladies Amateur Championship, the best performance by a Danish golfer in the European Championships until Emily Kristine Pedersen won the tournament in 2013. She also won the 2010 Mölle Masters on the Swedish Golf Tour by a convincing 8 strokes.

== Professional career ==
Vedel Hansen qualified for the 2011 Ladies European Tour (LET) by finishing 16th at Q-School in December 2010, and turned professional in January 2011. After three years on the LET, she finished ninth at the LPGA Final Qualifying Tournament in December 2013 to qualify for the 2014 LPGA Tour. In April 2014, she finished fourth at the Swinging Skirts LPGA Classic in San Francisco and followed up with fifth place at the Meijer LPGA Classic and the Portland Classic.

In early 2015, after finishing 45th on the 2014 LPGA Money List and reaching 59th place on the Women's World Golf Rankings, the highest ranked Danish golfer to date, she took an indefinite break from tour, and forfeited her start at the 2015 Women's PGA Championship. By the end of the year she announced she would not be seeking a medical extension, and instead retire from pro golf due to spinal disc herniation, only 26 years old.

== Professional wins (2) ==
=== Ladies European Tour (1) ===
No.	Date	Tournament	Winning score	To par	Margin of victory	Runner-up
1	10 Jun 2012	Allianz Ladies Slovak Open	71-69-69=209	−7	2 strokes	(Germany) Caroline Masson

=== Swedish Golf Tour (1) ===
No.	Date	Tournament	Winning score	To par	Margin of victory	Runner-up
1	17 Sep 2010	Mölle Masters (as an amateur)	71-72-69=212	+2	8 strokes	(Sweden) Therese Nilsson

== Results in LPGA majors ==
Tournament	2012	2013	2014	2015
Kraft Nabisco Championship			CUT	
U.S. Women's Open				CUT
Women's PGA Championship			CUT	
The Evian Championship^			T61	
Women's British Open	T33	T62	CUT	

^ The Evian Championship was added as a major in 2013

Did not play

CUT = missed the half-way cut
"T" = tied

== Team appearances ==
Amateur

- European Ladies' Team Championship (representing Denmark): 2008, 2010
- Espirito Santo Trophy (representing Denmark): 2010
