= 2026 LET Access Series =

Professional women's golf tour

2026 LET Access Series season
- Duration: 12 April 2026 – 20 November 2026
- Number of official events: 19

The 2026 LET Access Series is a series of professional women's golf tournaments held from April through October 2026 across Europe. The LET Access Series is the second-tier women's professional golf tour in Europe and is the official developmental tour of the Ladies European Tour.

== Changes for 2026 ==
The total number of tournaments was unchanged at 19, with the Ladies German Challenge and the Women's English Open tournament at Manchester Golf Club in England introduced as new tournaments. The Rose Ladies Open at Hanbury Manor was renamed the Pitch 15 Open.

== Tournament results ==
The table below shows the 2026 schedule. The numbers in brackets after the winners' names show the number of career wins they had on the LET Access Series up to and including that event.

Dates	Tournament	Location	Prize fund (€)	Winner	WWGR points	Notes
14 Apr	Madaëf Golfs Ladies Open	Morocco	50,000	(Switzerland) Caroline Sturdza (1)	1.60	
22 May	Allegria Stegersbach Ladies Open	Austria	50,000	(Germany) Hanna Tauber (1)	1.60	
7 Jun	Arkea Montauban Ladies Open	France	50,000	(France) Lauren Holmey (2)	1.80	
14 Jun	Raiffeisen Czech Ladies Challenge	Czech Republic	50,000	(Iceland) Hulda Gestsdóttir (1)	1.80	
21 Jun	Ladies German Challenge	Germany	70,000	(Sweden) Moa Svedenskiöld (1)	1.80	
26 Jun	Swedish PGA Championship	Sweden	50,000	(Sweden) Elsa Svensson (1)	1.70	
3 Jul	Swedish Strokeplay Championship	Sweden	50,000	(Norway) Silje Torvund Ohma (1)	1.80	
10 Jul	Women's English Open	England	80,000	(Czech Republic) Tereza Koželuhová (1)	1.90	
25 Jul	Pitch 15 Open	England	50,000	(Australia) Hannah Reeves (1)	1.90	
31 Jul	Women's Irish Challenge	Ireland	45,000	(Republic of Ireland) Beth Coulter (1)	2.00	
7 Aug	CSK Steel Women's Open	Denmark	50,000	(Sweden) Moa Svedenskiöld (2)	2.10	
14 Aug	Ladies Slovak Golf Open	Slovakia	50,000	(Slovakia) Michaela Vávrová (1)	1.90	
12 Sep	Hauts de France – Pas de Calais Golf Open	France	40,000	(France) Lucie Malchirand (1)	2.00	Mixed event with the Alps Tour
18 Sep	Lavaux Ladies Open	Switzerland	53,000	(England) Bel Wardle (1)	2.00	
10 Oct	Terre Blanche Ladies Open	France	45,000	(Germany) Theresa de Bochdanovits (1)	2.00	
16 Oct	Iberdrola Calatayud Ladies Open	Spain	50,000	(Sweden) Elsa Svensson (2)	1.90	
22 Oct	Super Bock Ladies Open	Portugal	50,000	(England) Ellie Gower (2)	1.80	
14 Nov	Santander Golf Tour Girona	Spain	45,000	(Australia) Hannah Reeves (2)	2.00	
20 Nov	Islantilla Open	Spain	100,000			

== Order of Merit rankings ==
The top 7 players on the LETAS Order of Merit earn membership of the Ladies European Tour for the 2027 season. Players finishing in positions 8–32 get to skip the first stage of qualifying and automatically progress to the final stage of the Lalla Aicha Tour School.

Standings after the Santander Golf Tour Girona:

Rank	Player	Country	Points	Status earned
1	Lauren Holmey	France	2,133	Promoted to Ladies European Tour (Note: Mathematically guaranteed to finish inside the top seven)
2	Natalie Armbrüster	Switzerland	1,807	Promoted to Ladies European Tour
3	Moa Svedenskiöld	Sweden	1,790	Promoted to Ladies European Tour
4	Elsa Svensson	Sweden	1,622	Promoted to Ladies European Tour
5	Bel Wardle	England	1,477	
6	Hannah Reeves	Australia	1,438	
7	Tereza Koželuhová	Czech Republic	1,246	
8	Theresa de Bochdanovits	Germany	1,170	
9	Hulda Gestsdóttir	Iceland	1,163	
10	Michaela Vávrová	Slovakia	1,059	

== See also ==
- 2026 Ladies European Tour
