= NCAA Division II women's golf championship =

NCAA Division II Women's Golf Championships

Tournament information
- Location: 2025: Boulder City, Nevada
- Established: 1996
- Course: 2026: PGA National Resort
- Par: 2026: 72
- Length: 2026: 5,987 yards (5,475 m)
- Format: 54-hole stroke play 8-team medal match play
- Month played: May

Current champion
- Team: Dallas Baptist; Individual: Amely Bochaton (Wingate)

The NCAA Division II Women's Golf Championship, played in May, is the annual competition in women's collegiate golf for individuals and teams from universities in Division II. It is a stroke play team competition that also includes an individual award.

A combined Division II and Division III championship was held from 1996 to 1999, splitting into separate championships starting in 2000.

In 2019, the format changed from four rounds of stroke play to three rounds of stroke play followed by an eight-team medal match play single-elimination tournament.

== Results ==
=== Divisions II and III combined (1996–1999) ===
Year	Site (Host team)	Par	Team championship				Individual championship	
Year	Site (Host team)	Par	Champion	Score	Runner-up	Score	Champion	Score
1996	Allendale, MI (Grand Valley State)	72 (288)	Methodist	1,286	Rollins	1,287	Shanna Nagy (Florida Southern)	313 (+25)
1997	Winter Park, FL (Rollins)	73 (292)	Lynn	1,292	Methodist	1,318	Zoe Grimbeek (Lynn)	315 (+23)
1998	Allendale, MI (Grand Valley State)	72 (288)	Methodist	1,254	Florida Southern	1,259	Shanna Nagy (Florida Southern)	301 (+13)
1999	–	72 (288)	Methodist	1,282	Florida Southern	1,285	Lisa Cave (Florida Southern)	313 (+25)

=== Division II only (2000–present) ===
Year	Site (Host team)	Par	Team championship				Individual championship	
Year	Site (Host team)	Par	Champion	Score	Runner-up	Score	Champion	Score
2000	Euless, TX	71 (284)	Florida Southern	1,259	Rollins	1,266	Lisa Cave (Florida Southern)	278 (−6)
2001	Rock Hill, SC	72 (288)	Florida Southern	1,250	Rollins	1,266	Jana Peterkova (Florida Southern)	302 (+14)
2002	Allendale, MI (Grand Valley State)	73 (292)	Florida Southern	1,234	Barry	1,308	Jana Peterkova (Florida Southern)	306 (+14)
2003	Howey-in-the-Hills, FL	73 (292)	Rollins	1,237	Florida Southern	1,276	Charlotte Campbell (Rollins)	299 (+7)
2004	Orlando, FL	72 (288)	Rollins	1,196	Ferris State; Florida Southern	1,264	Charlotte Campbell (Rollins)	299 (+11)
2005	Albuquerque, NM (Western New Mexico)	73 (292)	Rollins	1,185	Grand Valley State	1,220	Melissa Sneller (Grand Valley State)	292 (E)
2006	Allendale, MI (Grand Valley State)	72 † (216)	Rollins	919	Ferris State	925	Mariana De Biase (Rollins)	220 (+4)
2007	Pensacola, FL (West Florida)	72 (288)	Florida Southern	1,188	Rollins	1,198	Daniela Iacobelli (Florida Tech)	293 (+5)
2008	Houston, TX (Houston)	72 (288)	Rollins	1,181	Nova Southeastern	1,188	Joanna Coe (Rollins)	287 (−1)
2009	Findlay, OH (Findlay)	72 (288)	Nova Southeastern	1,230	Grand Valley State	1,245	Lyndsay McBride (Indianapolis)	298 (+10)
2010	Mesa, AZ	72 (288)	Nova Southeastern	1,180	Rollins	1,220	Sandra Changkija (Nova Southeastern)	284 (−4)
2011	Allendale, MI (Grand Valley State)	72 (288)	Nova Southeastern	1,157	Rollins	1,185	Taylor Collins (Nova Southeastern)	278 (−10)
2012	Louisville, KY (Bellarmine)	72 (288)	Nova Southeastern	1,234	Florida Southern	1,254	Abbey Gittings (Nova Southeastern)	298 (+10)
2013	Daytona Beach, FL	72 (288)	Lynn	1,187	Nova Southeastern	1,190	Nancy Vergara (Barry)	291 (+3)
2014	Conover, NC	71 (284)	Lynn	1,164	Barry	1,193	Louise Manalo (Lynn)	287 (−6)
2015	Allendale, MI (Grand Valley State)	72 (288)	Indianapolis	1,212	Rollins	1,217	Brenna Moore (Midwestern State)	297 (+9)
2016	Denver, CO (Metro State)	72 (288)	Rollins	1,173	Indianapolis	1,182	Gabrielle Shipley (Grand Valley State)	282 (−6)
2017	Findlay, OH (Findlay)	72 (288)	Barry	1,222	Dallas Baptist	1,223	Marie Coors (Saint Leo)	295 (+7)
2018	Houston, TX (Houston Baptist)	72 (288)	Indianapolis	1,157	California Baptist	1,195	Katharina Keilich (Indianapolis)	287 (−1)
2019	Palm Beach Gardens, FL	73 (219)	Florida Tech	4	Cal State San Marcos	1	Jaime Jacob (Cal State San Marcos)	219 (E)
2020	Cancelled due to the COVID-19 pandemic							
2021	Dearborn, MI	72 (216)	Dallas Baptist	2.5 (Note: Dallas Baptist won the tie-breaker – cumulative score)	Lynn	2.5	Helen Kreuzer (Lynn)	210 (−6)
2022	Gainesville, GA	72 (216)	Findlay	3	Limestone	2	Anahi Servin (Academy of Art)	211 (−5)
2023	Eureka, MO	72 (216)	Dallas Baptist	3	Nova Southeastern	2	Olivia Gronborg (Nova Southeastern)	210 (−6)
2024	Winter Garden, FL	72 (216)	Indianapolis	2.5 (Note: Indianapolis won in a playoff.)	St. Mary's (TX)	2.5	Gabby Woods (Findlay)	207 (−9)
2025	Boulder City, NV	72 (216)	Dallas Baptist	4	Central Missouri	1	Madison Murr (Cal State San Marcos)	202 (−14)
2026	Palm Beach Gardens, FL	72 (216)	Dallas Baptist	5	Anderson (SC)	0	Amely Bochaton (Wingate)	203 (−13)

== Multiple winners ==
=== Team ===
The following schools have won more than one team championship:

- 6: Rollins
- 4: Dallas Baptist, Florida Southern, Nova Southeastern
- 3: Indianapolis, Lynn, Methodist

=== Individual champion ===
The following women have won more than one individual championship:

- 2: Charlotte Campbell, Lisa Cave, Shanna Nagy, Jana Peterkova

=== Individual champion's school ===
The following schools have produced more than one individual champion:

- 6 champions: Florida Southern
- 4 champions: Rollins, Nova Southeastern
- 3 champions: Lynn
- 2 champions: Cal State San Marcos, Grand Valley State, Indianapolis

== See also ==
- AIAW Intercollegiate Women's Golf Champions
- NAIA Women's Golf Championship
- National Golf Coaches Association
