= Ladies Slovak Open =

Professional golf tournament

Tournament information
- Location: Brezno, Slovakia
- Established: 2010
- Course: Golf Club Tále
- Par: 72
- Tours: Ladies European Tour; LET Access Series
- Format: Stroke play
- Prize fund: €50,000
- Month played: August

Current champion
- (Slovakia) Michaela Vávrová

Location map
- Location in Slovakia

The Ladies Slovak Open is a women's professional golf tournament held on the Gray Bear Course at Golf Club Tále in Brezno, Slovakia. It was part of the Ladies European Tour between 2010 and 2014, and returned as part of the LET Access Series in 2024.

== History ==
The inaugural tournament was won by María Hernández, for her maiden LET title. In 2011, First Lady of Slovakia Silvia Gašparovičová opened the tournament, which Caroline Hedwall won for her first of four titles that season.

== Winners ==
Year	Tour (Note: LET – Ladies European Tour; LETAS – LET Access Series.)	Winner	Country	Score	Winning margin	Runner(s)-up	Purse (€)
Ladies Slovak Golf Open
2026	LETAS	Michaela Vávrová	Slovakia	217 (+1)	Playoff	(France) Lauren Holmey	50,000
2025	LETAS	Anna Backman	Finland	212 (−4)	2 strokes	(Czech Republic) Jana Melichová	50,000
2024	LETAS	Tina Mazarino	Norway	210 (−6)	3 strokes	(New Zealand) Wenyung Keh (Slovakia) Michaela Vávrová	45,000
2015–2023: No tournament
Allianz Ladies Slovak Open
2014	LET	Camilla Lennarth	Sweden	277 (−11)	4 strokes	(England) Melissa Reid	275,000
2013	LET	Gwladys Nocera	France	279 (−9)	4 strokes	(South Africa) Lee-Anne Pace	250,000
2012	LET	Line Vedel	Denmark	209 (−7)	2 strokes	(Germany) Caroline Masson	225,000
2011	LET	Caroline Hedwall	Sweden	205 (−11) (Note: Reduced to 54 holes due to thunderstorms.)	2 strokes	(Netherlands) Christel Boeljon	350,000
2010	LET	María Hernández	Spain	280 (−8)	1 stroke	(Australia) Kristie Smith	350,000
