= Helen Tamy Kreuzer =

German professional golfer (born 1998)

Personal information
- Nationality: Germany
- Born: 16 August 1998 (age 28) Bensheim, Germany
- Height: 167 cm (5 ft 6 in)

Career
- Sport: Golf
- College: Lynn University
- Turned professional: 2021
- Current tours: Ladies European Tour (joined 2022); Sunshine Ladies Tour; LET Access Series
- Professional wins: 1

Helen Tamy Kreuzer (born 16 August 1998) is a German professional golfer and Ladies European Tour player. In 2024, she won the Fidelity ADT Ladies Challenge on the Sunshine Ladies Tour. As an amateur she won the 2021 NCAA Division II Championship.

== Early life, education, and amateur career ==
Kreuzer was born in Bensheim, Germany, and began playing golf at the age of four. She won the Hesse State Championship in 2019 and the German National Amateur in 2020.

Kreuzer was educated at Goethe-Gymnasium, Frankfurt before enrolling at Lynn University in Boca Raton, Florida, where she played with the Lynn Fighting Knights women's golf team between spring 2017 and 2021. In her final year, she was an WGCA First Team All-American and won the Sunshine State Conference Championship and the NCAA Division II Championship.

Kreuzer appeared for Germany at the European Ladies' Team Championship twice. Along with Alexandra Försterling, Aline Krauter and Paula Schulz-Hanssen she was runner-up at the 2020 European Ladies' Team Championship, after Germany fell 2–1 in the final to a Swedish team with Linn Grant, Ingrid Lindblad, Maja Stark and Beatrice Wallin. Kratuer captured the German point, beating Lindblad 3 & 2.

== Professional career ==
Kreuzer turned professional in late 2021 and joined the 2022 Ladies European Tour. In her rookie season, her best finish came at the KPMG Women's Irish Open, where she shot a final round of 65 (−7) to finish tied 11th. She also captained a team at the Aramco Team Series – Jeddah, where she finished in 3rd place with teammates Lina Boqvist and Virginia Elena Carta.

In March 2024, Kreuzer won the Fidelity ADT Ladies Challenge on the Sunshine Ladies Tour in South Africa. She holed a 3-meter birdie putt on the first playoff hole, the par-five 18th, to clinch her maiden professional title.

== Amateur wins ==
- 2019 NCAA D2 South Regional, Hesse State Championship, UIndy Fall Invitational, Hatter Classic
- 2020 Golfsportmanufaktur Schäfflertanz Intlernational Open, German National Amateur
- 2021 Saint Leo Invitational, Sunshine State Conference Championship, NCAA Division II Championship

== Professional wins (1) ==
=== Sunshine Ladies Tour (1) ===
No.	Date	Tournament	Winning score	To par	Margin of victory	Runner-up
1	8 Mar 2024	Fidelity ADT Ladies Challenge	70-68-66=204	−12	Playoff	(Norway) Tina Mazarino

Sunshine Ladies Tour playoff record (1–0)

No.	Year	Tournament	Opponent	Result
1	2024	Fidelity ADT Ladies Challenge	(Norway) Tina Mazarino	Won with birdie on first extra hole

== Team appearances ==
Amateur

- European Ladies' Team Championship (representing Germany): 2020, 2021
