= St Ibb Ladies Open =

Tournament information
- Location: Ven, Sweden
- Established: 2008
- Course: St Ibb Golf Club
- Par: 68
- Tour: Swedish Golf Tour
- Format: 54-hole stroke play
- Prize fund: SEK 200,000
- Final year: 2014

Tournament record score
- Aggregate: 206 Caroline Hedwall
- To par: −9 Camilla Svensson

Final champion
- (Sweden) Caroline Hedwall

The St Ibb Ladies Open was a women's professional golf tournament on the Swedish Golf Tour, played between 2008 and 2014. It was held on the island of Ven near Landskrona, Sweden.

Teenage twins Jacqueline and Caroline Hedwall finished top at the inaugural event in 2008, played in part at Barsebäck Golf & Country Club, their home club. The SEK 60,000 first prize check went to third placed Sarah Heath, England, as the Hedwall twins were amateurs.

== Winners ==
Year	Venue	Winner	Score	Margin of victory	Runner(s)-up	Prize fund (SEK)	Ref
St Ibb Ladies Open
2014	St Ibb	(Sweden) Caroline Hedwall	206 (+2)	1 stroke	(Sweden) Natalie Wille	200,000	
2012–2013: No tournament
2011	St Ibb	(Sweden) Camilla Svensson	207 (−9)	Playoff	(Sweden) Maria Ohlsson (Sweden) Anna Dahlberg Söderström	200,000	
2009–2010: No tournament
Telenor Masters
2008	Barsebäck/St Ibb	(Sweden) Caroline Hedwall (a)	211 (–2)	3 strokes	(Sweden) Jacqueline Hedwall (a)	300,000	
