= Madaëf Golfs Ladies Open =

Professional golf tournament

Tournament information
- Location: Fez, Morocco
- Established: 2025
- Course: Royal Golf de Fes
- Par: 72
- Tour: LET Access Series
- Format: 54-hole Stroke play
- Prize fund: €50,000
- Month played: April

Tournament record score
- Aggregate: 209 Caroline Sturdza
- To par: –7 as above

Current champion
- (Switzerland) Caroline Sturdza

Location map
- Location in Morocco Location in Europe

The Madaëf Golfs Ladies Open is a women's professional golf tournament on the LET Access Series, held in Morocco.

The inaugural tournament held in 2025 at Golf Lacs in Saïdia on the Mediterranean Sea marked the first time the LET Access Series staged an event in Africa.

For the following year the event was moved inland to Royal Golf de Fes, in Fez, and it became the tour's season opener.

== Winners ==
| Year | Winner | Country | Score | Margin of victory | Runner-up | Venue | Ref |
Madaëf Golfs Ladies Open by MSE
| 2026 | Caroline Sturdza | Switzerland | –7 (71-68-70=209) | 1 stroke | (Switzerland) Natalie Armbruester | Royal Golf de Fes | |
Madaëf Golfs Ladies Open by Saïdia Resorts
| 2025 | Thalia Martin | England | −2 (74-69-71=214) | Playoff | (England) Charlotte Heath | Golf Lacs Saïdia | |

== See also ==
- Lalla Meryem Cup
