= 2025 Sunshine Ladies Tour =

12th season of the Sunshine Ladies Tour

2025 Sunshine Ladies Tour season
- Duration: 14 February 2025 – 13 April 2025
- Number of official events: 8
- Order of Merit Winner: (South Africa) Casandra Alexander
- Rookie of the Year: (South Africa) Kaiyuree Moodley

The 2025 Sunshine Ladies Tour was the 12th season of the Sunshine Ladies Tour, a series of professional golf tournaments for women based in South Africa.

== Schedule ==
The season consisted of 8 events, all held in South Africa, played between February and April.

After 11 installments, the Dimension Data Ladies Pro-Am changed name to the NTT Data Ladies Pro-Am.

Near Pretoria, the Fidelity ADT Ladies Challenge was replaced by the Platinum Ladies Open.

The Investec South African Women's Open and the Joburg Ladies Open were again co-sanctioned with the Ladies European Tour.

Date	Tournament	Venue	Winner	Purse (ZAR)	Notes
16 Feb	NTT Data Ladies Pro-Am	Fancourt Country Club	(South Africa) Danielle du Toit	2,500,000	Pro-Am
22 Feb	Standard Bank Ladies Open	Durbanville Golf Club	(France) Lucie Malchirand	1,000,000	
28 Feb	Jabra Ladies Classic	Westlake Golf Club	(South Africa) Casandra Alexander	1,000,000	
7 Mar	SuperSport Ladies Challenge	Gary Player Country Club	(South Africa) Nadia van der Westhuizen	1,300,000	
21 Mar	Platinum Ladies Open	Blair Atholl Golf & Equestrian Estate	(South Africa) Kiera Floyd	1,200,000	
29 Mar	ABSA Ladies Invitational	Royal Johannesburg & Kensington Golf Club	(England) Thalia Martin	1,200,000	
6 Apr	Joburg Ladies Open	Modderfontein Golf Club	(England) Mimi Rhodes	€300,000	Co-sanctioned with the Ladies European Tour
13 Apr	Investec South African Women's Open	Erinvale Golf Club	(France) Perrine Delacour	€340,000	Co-sanctioned with the Ladies European Tour

== Order of Merit ==
This shows the leaders in the final Order of Merit:

Rank	Player	Points
1	(South Africa) Casandra Alexander	3,149
2	(South Africa) Kiera Floyd	1,495
3	(South Africa) Lee-Anne Pace	1,066
4	(South Africa) Danielle du Toit	886
5	(South Africa) Nadia van der Westhuizen	825
