= Santander Golf Tour Barcelona =

Tournament information
- Location: Barcelona, Catalonia, Spain
- Established: 2016
- Course: Empordà Golf
- Par: 72
- Tours: Santander Golf Tour; LET Access Series
- Format: Stroke play
- Prize fund: €45,000
- Month played: March

Current champion
- (Australia) Hannah Reeves

The Santander Golf Tour Barcelona is a women's professional golf tournament on Spain's Santander Golf Tour that has featured on the LET Access Series. It was first played in 2016 and is held near Barcelona, Spain.

== Winners ==
Year	Tour (Note: Several installments have been hosted under co-sanctioning agreement with the LET Access Series (LETAS))	Winner(s)	Country	Score	Margin of victory	Runner(s)-up	Purse (€)	Ref
Santander Golf Tour Girona
2025	LETAS	Hannah Reeves	Australia	–13 (66-67-67=200)	4 strokes	(Switzerland) Tiffany Arafi (France) Alice Kong (a)	45,000	
2025		Lauren Holmey	Netherlands	–10 (67-65=132)	1 stroke	(Spain) María Herráez		
2024		María Herráez	Spain	–7 (69-68=137)	Playoff	(France) Lucie André (Netherlands) Nikki Hofstede		
2023	LETAS	Lucie André	France	+1 (72-72-70=214)	Playoff	(Netherlands) Marit Harryvan (Denmark) Sofie Kibsgaard Nielsen (England) Emily Price (Sweden) Emma Thorngren	40,000	
2022		Piti Martínez Bernal; Natalia Escuriola	Spain	–12 (64-66=130)	1 stroke	(Spain) Mireia Prat (Spain) María Laura Elvira		(Note: Team event)
Santander Golf Tour Barcelona
2021	LETAS	Charlotte Liautier (a)	France	E (71-71-74=216)	1 stroke	(Germany) Helen Briem (a) (England) Rachael Goodall	35,000	
2020	No tournament							
2019		Johanna Gustavsson	Sweden	−2 (71-71=142)	Playoff	(Finland) Krista Bakker	20,000	
Santander Golf Tour LETAS El Prat
2018	LETAS	Julia Engström	Sweden	−3 (76-71-66=213)	1 stroke	(Spain) Mireia Prat	35,000	
Santander Golf Tour Vallromanes
2017		Silvia Bañón	Spain	−5 (139)				
2016		Carolina González	Spain	−6 (138)				
