= Laura Beveridge =

Scottish professional golfer

Personal information
- Nationality: Scotland
- Born: 8 August 1988 (age 38) Aberdeen, Scotland
- Height: 5 ft 8 in (1.73 m)

Career
- Sport: Golf
- College: Robert Gordon University
- Turned professional: 2013
- Current tour: Ladies European Tour (joined 2015)
- Former tour: LET Access Series (joined 2013)
- Professional wins: 3

Achievements and awards
- Ladies Tartan Tour Order of Merit: 2014

Laura Beveridge (born 8 August 1988) is a Scottish professional golfer who plays on the Ladies European Tour. She competed as Laura Murray until she married PGA Golf Professional Keil Beveridge in October 2021. She was runner-up at the 2022 Estrella Damm Ladies Open.

== Early life and amateur career ==
Beveridge grew up in Alford, Aberdeenshire, and has been playing golf since she was ten years old. She attended Robert Gordon University, where she studied Sport and Exercise Science.

Beveridge had a successful amateur career and won the St Rule Trophy in 2010 and 2012, and the Scottish Women's Amateur Championship in 2012. She accumulated 32 caps for Scotland, including playing in the Women's Home Internationals, the European Ladies' Team Championship, and representing Scotland at the 2012 Espirito Santo Trophy.

== Professional career ==
Beveridge turned professional in 2013 and joined the LET Access Series, where her best finish in her rookie season was a T10 at the Norrporten Ladies Open in Sweden. In 2014 she was T3 at the Kristianstad Åhus Ladies Open, and secured an LET card at Q-School. In her rookie season on the LET she finished 87th in the Order of Merit.

Beveridge shared her time between LET and LETAS from 2015 and 2020. She lost a playoff to Ariane Provot at the 2015 Sölvesborg Ladies Open, but secured her first LETAS title at the 2016 Elisefarm Ladies Open. She finished T13 at the 2016 Sanya Ladies Open in China. In 2019, Beveridge played in five LET events with a season-best T7 in the Tipsport Czech Ladies Open, and claimed her second LETAS title in the Rügenwalder Mühle Ladies Open at Golf am Meer, near Bremen. She finished fourth on the LETAS Order of Merit to earn full LET playing rights for 2020.

In 2020, Beveridge played in nine events with a season-best T10 at the Saudi Ladies Team International. In 2021 she headed to Q-School in December and finished in the top-20 to secure her full playing rights for 2022, where she was T4 at the Amundi German Masters and solo second behind Carlota Ciganda at the 2022 Estrella Damm Ladies Open.

== Amateur wins ==
- 2010 St Rule Trophy
- 2012 St Rule Trophy, Scottish Women's Amateur Championship

== Professional wins (3) ==
=== LET Access Series wins (2) ===
No.	Date	Tournament	Score	Margin of victory	Runner(s)-up
1	17 Sep 2016	Elisefarm Ladies Open	−7 (69-70-70=209)	2 strokes	(Australia) Stacey Keating (Austria) Sarah Schober
2	28 Sep 2019	Rügenwalder Mühle Ladies Open	−14 (64-68-70=202)	2 strokes	(France) Marie Fourquier

=== Santander Golf Tour wins (1) ===
No.	Date	Tournament	Winning score	Margin of victory	Runner-up	Ref
1	25 Oct 2018	Santander Golf Tour Cáceres	137 (–7)	1 stroke	(Spain) Marta Sanz Barrio	

== Team appearances ==
Amateur

- Women's Home Internationals: (representing Scotland): 2007, 2008, 2009, 2010, 2012
- European Ladies' Team Championship (representing Scotland): 2008, 2010
- Espirito Santo Trophy: (representing Scotland): 2012
