= Caroline Hedwall =

Swedish professional golfer (born 1989)

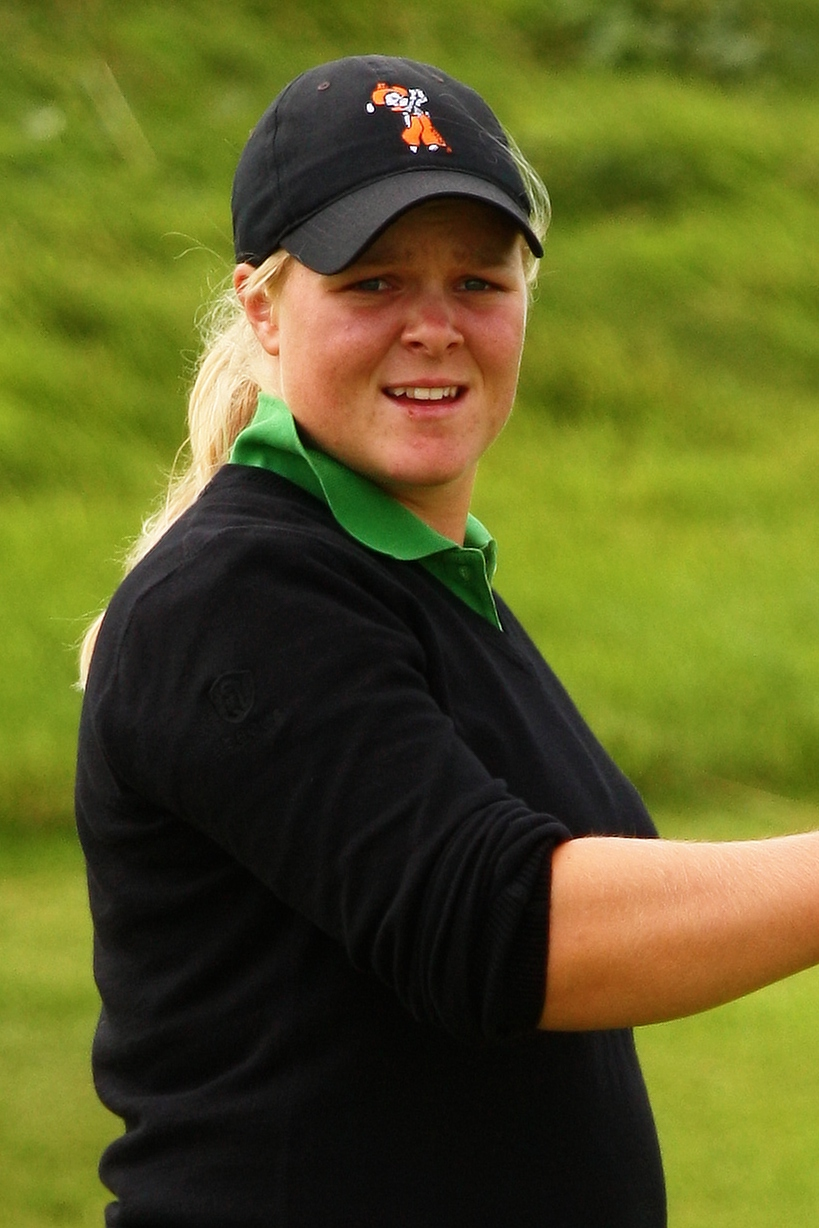
- Hedwall at the 2010 Women's British Open

Personal information
- Full name: Caroline Ingrid Hedwall
- Nationality: Sweden
- Born: 13 May 1989 (age 37) Täby, Sweden
- Height: 5 ft 7 in (1.70 m)
- Life partner: Fredrika Winqvist

Career
- Sport: Golf
- College: Oklahoma State University
- Turned professional: 2010
- Current tours: LPGA Tour (joined 2011); LET (joined 2011)
- Professional wins: 18

Number of wins by tour
- Ladies European Tour: 7
- WPGA Tour of Australasia: 3
- Other: 8

Best results in LPGA major championships
- Chevron Championship: T3: 2013
- Women's PGA C'ship: T37: 2013
- U.S. Women's Open: T31: 2013
- Women's British Open: T27: 2010
- Evian Championship: T17: 2019

Achievements and awards
- Ladies European Tour Rookie of the Year: 2011
- Ladies European Tour Player of the Year: 2011
- Swedish Golfer of the Year: 2011
- Honda Sports Award: 2010

Caroline Ingrid Hedwall (born 13 May 1989) is a Swedish professional golfer who plays on the Ladies European Tour (LET) and the LPGA Tour. In 2013 she became the first player to win five matches in a single Solheim Cup event. As an amateur she was a dominating player, winning the European Ladies Amateur Championship as well as the individual titles at the Espirito Santo Trophy and the NCAA Championship.

== Early years ==
Hedwall started to play golf at age eight, living in Täby outside Stockholm, Sweden, and moved with her family to Löddeköpinge at 15 years of age, coming to represent Barsebäck Golf & Country Club. She is the daughter of Yvonne and Claes Hedwall and has a twin sister, Jacqueline, who, just as Caroline, also played collegiate golf in the United States, at Louisiana State University, represented Sweden as an amateur and turned professional.

== Amateur career ==
Hedwall's amateur career was very successful. In 2006, 17 years old, she became the second girl to win the Swedish Junior Stroke-play Championship as well as the Swedish Junior Match-play Championship, both championships for players up to 21, during the same season.

As an 18-year-old, she finished lone 7th at her Ladies European Tour debut, the 2007 Scandinavian TPC hosted by Annika, at her home course Barsebäck, two strokes better than tournament host Annika Sörenstam. In 2006–2008, Hedwall won six times on the professional Swedish Golf Tour, being an amateur without the possibility to receive any prize money. At the 2008 Telenor Masters at Barsebäck, the two amateur Hedwall twins finished first and second and the SEK 60,000 first prize check went to third placed Sarah Heath, England.

At the 2007 Junior Solheim Cup, the two Hedwall sisters both played on the winning European team. The Hedwall twins were also part of the winning Swedish teams at the European Ladies' Team Championship in 2008 and 2010.

Hedwall won the individual European Ladies Amateur Championship in 2007 and 2009, and both the team and individual title at the amateur worlds, the Espirito Santo Trophy in 2008.

She accepted a golf scholarship to Oklahoma State University in 2008. While at Oklahoma State she was the 2010 NCAA Individual Champion, 2010 NGCA Player of the Year, 2010 Golfstat Cup Winner, 2009 and 2010 First-Team All-American, and Big 12 Player of the Year in 2009 and 2010. In 2010, she also won the Honda Sports Award as the best female collegiate golfer in the nation.

She was tied 27th, best Swedish player and low amateur at the 2010 Women's British Open. Before turning professional, Hedwall represented Sweden a last time at the Espirito Santo Trophy at the end of 2010, earning a bronze medal with her team.

== Professional career ==
Hedwall was the medalist at the final stage of LET Qualifying School, a nine-stroke victory on 19 December 2010 to earn her LET card for 2011. In her first tournament as a professional, she won the 2011 New South Wales Open in Australia on the ALPG Tour in January. On the LET, she won the Allianz Ladies Slovak Open in May, Finnair Masters in July, UNIQA Ladies Golf Open in September, and the Hero Women's Indian Open in December. She was a captain's selection to the European team for the 2011 Solheim Cup in Ireland. She ended the year by winning the LET Player of the Year and LET Rookie of the Year awards.

Hedwall was again a captain's pick for Team Europe at the 2013 Solheim Cup at the Colorado Golf Club in the Denver area. In that event, she became the first player in Solheim Cup history to win five matches in a single competition, helping lead Team Europe to a surprising 18–10 win. It was the Europeans' first successful defense of the Cup, and also the first win for Team Europe on American soil.

In September 2018, Hedwall won the Lacoste Ladies Open de France, with a score of 12-under-par over 72 holes, recording her first professional victory in three years. The following year, she qualified for her fourth Solheim Cup appearance for the European team.

From 2021, Hedwall focused on the Ladies European Tour instead of the LPGA. In November 2022, she won the tour final Andalucia Costa Del Sol Open De España, moving her to eighth on the 2022 final Order of Merit and advancing 82 positions to 137th on the world rankings. Despite being ranked 121st, she was picked for the 2023 Solheim Cup by captain Suzann Pettersen. In the Sunday singles, Hedwall delivered one of the best stretches of golf in Solheim Cup history, going from 3 down after 12 holes to flip her match to a 2 up victory over Ally Ewing after birdieing five of the last six holes, preventing the United States from winning.

== Awards, honors ==
In 2011, Hedwall received Elit Sign number 137 by the Swedish Golf Federation based on world ranking achievements.

For the 2011 season, she was elected Swedish Golfer of the Year, male or female, amateur or professional.

In 2012, she was awarded honorary member of the PGA of Sweden.

As receipant number 47, Hedwall was in 2015 awarded the Golden Club by the Swedish Golf Federation for outstanding contributions to Swedish golf.

== Amateur wins ==
- 2006 Swedish Junior Match-play Championship, Swedish Junior Stroke-play Championship
- 2007 European Ladies Amateur Championship
- 2008 World Amateur Championship (individual title at Espirito Santo Trophy)
- 2009 European Ladies Amateur Championship
- 2010 NCAA Division I Individual Championship

== Professional wins (18) ==
=== Ladies European Tour wins (7) ===
| No. | Date | Tournament | Winning score | To par | Margin of victory | Runner(s)-up | Winner's share (€) |
|---|---|---|---|---|---|---|---|
| 1 | 28 May 2011 | Allianz Ladies Slovak Open | 71-67-67=205 | −11 | 2 strokes | (Netherlands) Christel Boeljon | 52,500 |
| 2 | 2 Jul 2011 | Finnair Masters | 69-65-68=202 | −11 | 2 strokes | (Netherlands) Christel Boeljon | 30,000 |
| 3 | 4 Sep 2011 | UNIQA Ladies Golf Open | 73-67-64=204 | −12 | 4 strokes | (France) Caroline Afonso | 30,000 |
| 4 | 11 Dec 2011 | Hero Women's Indian Open | 67-68-69=204 | −12 | 2 strokes | (Thailand) Pornanong Phatlum | 33,000 |
| 5 | 9 Sep 2012 | UNIQA Ladies Golf Open | 67-66-70=203 | −13 | 4 strokes | (England) Laura Davies (Sweden) Mikaela Parmlid | 30,000 |
| 6 | 9 Sep 2018 | Lacoste Ladies Open de France | 69-71-70-62=272 | −12 | 2 strokes | (South Africa) Stacy Lee Bregman | 41,250 |
| 7 | 27 Nov 2022 | Andalucia Costa Del Sol Open De España | 70-68-69-67=274 | −18 | Playoff | (Switzerland) Morgane Métraux | 97,500 |

Ladies European Tour playoff record (1–0)

| No. | Year | Tournament | Opponent | Result |
|---|---|---|---|---|
| 1 | 2022 | Andalucia Costa Del Sol Open De España | (Switzerland) Morgane Métraux | Won with birdie on fourth extra hole |

=== Australian Ladies Professional Golf Tour wins (3) ===
| No. | Date | Tournament | Winning score | To par | Margin of victory | Runner-up | Winner's share (AUD) |
|---|---|---|---|---|---|---|---|
| 1 | 23 Jan 2011 | Bing Lee Samsung NSW Women's Open | 67-68-70=205 | −11 | 1 stroke | (New Zealand) Lydia Ko (a) | 18,750 |
| 2 | 20 Jan 2013 | Mount Broughton Classic | 67-65=132 | −12 | 4 strokes | (Australia) Emma de Groot | 4,500 |
| 3 | 27 Jan 2013 | Bing Lee Samsung Women's New South Wales Open | 66-69-68=203 | −13 | 2 strokes | (New Zealand) Lydia Ko (a) | 18,750 |

=== Swedish Golf Tour wins (8) ===
| No. | Date | Tournament | Winning score | To par | Margin of victory | Runner-up | Winner's share (SEK) |
|---|---|---|---|---|---|---|---|
| 1 | 25 Aug 2006 | Swedish Match-play Championship (as an amateur) | 7 and 5 | | | (Sweden) Johanna Lundberg | 27,000 (Note: As Hedwell was an amateur, she received no prize money. The winner's share was allocated to the best placed professional.) |
| 2 | 10 Jun 2007 | Isover Ladies Open (as an amateur) | 67-70-72=209 | −4 | 3 strokes | (Finland) Sohvi Härkönen | 27,000 |
| 3 | 4 Aug 2007 | SI · Gefle Ladies Open (as an amateur) | 73-70-72=215 | −1 | Playoff | (Switzerland) Florence Lüscher | 36,000 |
| 4 | 18 Aug 2007 | Hotel Falköping Ladies Cup (as an amateur) | 72-71=143 | −1 | 1 stroke | (Spain) Nuria Clau | 20,000 |
| 5 | 22 Sep 2007 | PGA Gibson Open (as an amateur) | 73-71-69=213 | −3 | 5 strokes | (Norway) Marianne Skarpnord | 27,000 |
| 6 | 10 May 2008 | Telenor Masters (as an amateur) | 72-68-71=211 | −2 | 3 strokes | (Sweden) Jacqueline Hedwall (a) | 60,000 |
| 7 | 14 Jun 2014 | St Ibb Ladies Open | 71-69-66=206 | +2 | 1 stroke | (Sweden) Natalie Wille | 32,000 |
| 8 | 11 Oct 2014 | Svedala Ladies Open | 67-69-72=208 | −5 | 1 stroke | (Sweden) Johanna Björk | 60,000 |

== Results in LPGA majors ==
Results not in chronological order.

| Tournament | 2008 | 2009 | 2010 | 2011 | 2012 | 2013 | 2014 | 2015 | 2016 | 2017 | 2018 | 2019 | 2020 | 2021 | 2022 | 2023 |
|---|---|---|---|---|---|---|---|---|---|---|---|---|---|---|---|---|
| Chevron Championship | | | | | T56 | T3 | T64 | T46 | CUT | T66 | | | CUT | | | |
| Women's PGA Championship | | | | | CUT | T37 | CUT | 71 | CUT | 67 | CUT | T53 | CUT | CUT | | |
| U.S. Women's Open | | | | | CUT | T31 | T38 | CUT | | CUT | | CUT | CUT | | | |
| The Evian Championship ^ | | | | | | T19 | T50 | CUT | CUT | T40 | T54 | T17 | NT | | | |
| Women's British Open | CUT | CUT | T27LA | T30 | CUT | CUT | CUT | T28 | CUT | | CUT | T44 | CUT | | | T66 |

^ The Evian Championship was added as a major in 2013.

Top 10
Did not play

LA = low amateur
CUT = missed the halfway cut
NT = no tournament
"T" indicates a tie for a place

=== Summary ===
| Tournament | Wins | 2nd | 3rd | Top-5 | Top-10 | Top-25 | Events | Cuts made |
|---|---|---|---|---|---|---|---|---|
| Chevron Championship | 0 | 0 | 1 | 1 | 1 | 1 | 7 | 5 |
| Women's PGA Championship | 0 | 0 | 0 | 0 | 0 | 0 | 10 | 4 |
| U.S. Women's Open | 0 | 0 | 0 | 0 | 0 | 0 | 7 | 2 |
| The Evian Championship | 0 | 0 | 0 | 0 | 0 | 2 | 7 | 5 |
| Women's British Open | 0 | 0 | 0 | 0 | 0 | 0 | 13 | 5 |
| Totals | 0 | 0 | 1 | 1 | 1 | 3 | 44 | 21 |

- Most consecutive cuts made – 3 (four times)
- Longest streak of top-10s – 1

== Ladies European Tour career summary ==
| Year | Tournaments played | Cuts made | Wins | 2nd | 3rd | Top 10s | Best finish | Earnings (€) | Order of Merit rank | Scoring average | Scoring rank |
|---|---|---|---|---|---|---|---|---|---|---|---|
| 2006 | 1 | 1 | 0 | 0 | 0 | 0 | 11 | n/a | n/a | 71.25 | |
| 2007 | 1 | 1 | 0 | 0 | 0 | 1 | 7 | n/a | n/a | 71.50 | |
| 2008 | 2 | 1 | 0 | 0 | 0 | 0 | 13 | n/a | n/a | 73.20 | |
| 2009 | 1 | 0 | 0 | 0 | 0 | 0 | CUT | n/a | n/a | 77.00 | |
| 2010 | 2 | 2 | 0 | 0 | 0 | 1 | T8 | n/a | n/a | 71.28 | |
| 2011 | 20 | 19 | 4 | 1 | 0 | 8 | 1 | 278,528 | 3 | 70.97 | 14 |
| 2012 | 6 | 5 | 1 | 1 | 0 | 3 | 1 | 80,780 | 29 | 70.55 | 3 |
| 2013 | 5 | 4 | 0 | 1 | 0 | 1 | 2 | 57,441 | 34 | 71.47 | 11 |
| 2014 | 6 | 5 | 0 | 0 | 0 | 1 | T5 | 44,883 | 43 | 71.28 | 12 |
| 2015 | 5 | 3 | 0 | 0 | 0 | 1 | T8 | 39,332 | 50 | 72.28 | 25 |
| 2016 | 10 | 7 | 0 | 2 | 0 | 4 | 2 | 110,095 | 8 | 71.50 | 17 |
| 2017 | 3 | 2 | 0 | 0 | 0 | 0 | T12 | 22,404 | 56 | 72.11 | 49 |
| 2018 | 10 | 8 | 1 | 2 | 0 | 5 | 1 | 124,013 | 3 | 70.58 | 10 |
| 2019 | 13 | 12 | 0 | 2 | 3 | 6 | T2 | 165,390 | 6 | 71.15 | 13 |
| 2020 | 6 | 4 | 0 | 0 | 2 | 2 | 3 | 70,639 | 17 | 72.28 | 25 |
| 2021 | 13 | 13 | 0 | 0 | 0 | 0 | T12 | 61,879 | 35 | 72.24 | 28 |
| 2022 | 18 | 15 | 1 | 1 | 0 | 9 | 1 | 213,335 | 8 | 71.20 | 14 |

== LPGA Tour career summary ==
| Year | Tournaments played | Cuts made | Wins | 2nd | 3rd | Top 10s | Best finish | Earnings ($) | Money list rank | Scoring average | Scoring rank |
|---|---|---|---|---|---|---|---|---|---|---|---|
| 2008 | 1 | 0 | 0 | 0 | 0 | 0 | CUT | n/a | n/a | 77.50 | n/a |
| 2009 | 1 | 0 | 0 | 0 | 0 | 0 | CUT | n/a | n/a | 77.00 | n/a |
| 2010 | 1 | 1 | 0 | 0 | 0 | 0 | T27 | n/a | n/a | 72.75 | n/a |
| 2011 | 6 | 6 | 0 | 0 | 0 | 0 | T12 | 126,801 | 64 | 71.70 | n/a |
| 2012 | 18 | 13 | 0 | 0 | 0 | 2 | T5 | 216,074 | 57 | 72.27 | 44 |
| 2013 | 23 | 21 | 0 | 0 | 3 | 6 | 3 | 763,104 | 14 | 71.08 | 20 |
| 2014 | 18 | 14 | 0 | 1 | 0 | 1 | 2 | 359,016 | 46 | 72.23 | 68 |
| 2015 | 18 | 11 | 0 | 0 | 0 | 0 | T26 | 98,117 | 93 | 72.98 | 103 |
| 2016 | 18 | 6 | 0 | 0 | 0 | 1 | 5 | 94,733 | 99 | 72.57 | 95 |
| 2017 | 19 | 11 | 0 | 0 | 0 | 0 | T11 | 125,240 | 92 | 71.81 | 81 |
| 2018 | 17 | 7 | 0 | 0 | 0 | 1 | T9 | 96,188 | 104 | 71.45 | 51 |
| 2019 | 13 | 11 | 0 | 0 | 0 | 0 | T12 | 154,094 | 88 | 71.50 | 68 |
| 2020 | 10 | 1 | 0 | 0 | 0 | 0 | T15 | 28,249 | 123 | 73.57 | 121 |
| 2021 | 4 | 0 | 0 | 0 | 0 | 0 | CUT | 0 | n/a | 75.88 | n/a |
| 2022 | 1 | 0 | 0 | 0 | 0 | 0 | CUT | 0 | n/a | 72.00 | n/a |
| 2023 | 3 | 2 | 0 | 0 | 0 | 1 | T6 | 68,984 | 144 | 71.90 | n/a |

== World ranking ==
Position in Women's World Golf Rankings at the end of each calendar year.

| Year | World ranking | Source |
|---|---|---|
| 2006 | 456 | |
| 2007 | 380 | |
| 2008 | 409 | |
| 2009 | 625 | |
| 2010 | 352 | |
| 2011 | 37 | |
| 2012 | 40 | |
| 2013 | 23 | |
| 2014 | 55 | |
| 2015 | 141 | |
| 2016 | 171 | |
| 2017 | 170 | |
| 2018 | 123 | |
| 2019 | 125 | |
| 2020 | 139 | |
| 2021 | 233 | |
| 2022 | 125 | |
| 2023 | 118 | |
| 2024 | 232 | |

== Team appearances ==
Amateur

- European Girls' Team Championship (representing Sweden): 2006, 2007 (winners)
- Junior Solheim Cup (representing Europe): 2007 (winners)
- European Ladies' Team Championship (representing Sweden): 2008 (winners), 2009, 2010 (winners)
- Vagliano Trophy (representing the Continent of Europe): 2009 (winners)
- Espirito Santo Trophy (representing Sweden): 2008 (winners and individual winner), 2010

Professional

- Solheim Cup (representing Europe): 2011 (winners), 2013 (winners), 2015, 2019 (winners), 2023 (tie, cup retained)
- International Crown (representing Sweden): 2014, 2018, 2023

=== Solheim Cup record ===
| Year | Total matches | Total W–L–H | Singles W–L–H | Foursomes W–L–H | Fourballs W–L–H | Points won | Points % |
|---|---|---|---|---|---|---|---|
| Career | 17 | 9–7–1 | 2–2–1 | 3–1–0 | 4–4–0 | 9.5 | 55.8 |
| 2011 | 4 | 2–1–1 | 0–0–1 halved w/ R. O'Toole | 1–0–0 won w/ S. Gustafson 6&5 | 1–1–0 won w/ S. Gustafson 5&4 lost w/ S. Pettersen 1 up | 2.5 | 62.5 |
| 2013 | 5 | 5–0–0 | 1–0–0 defeated M. Wie 1 up | 2–0–0 won w/ A. Nordqvist 4 & 2 won w/ A. Nordqvist 2 & 1 | 2–0–0 won w/ C. Masson 2 & 1 won w/ C. Masson 2 & 1 | 5 | 100.0 |
| 2015 | 4 | 1–3–0 | 0–1–0 lost to M. Wie 6&4 | 0–1–0 lost w/ A. Nordqvist 5&4 | 1–1–0 won w/ A. Nordqvist 4&3, lost w/ C. Masson 1 dn | 1.0 | 25.0 |
| 2019 | 2 | 0–2–0 | 0–1–0 lost to N. Korda 2 dn | | 0–1-0 lost w/ A. Nordqvist 7&5 | 0 | 0.0 |
| 2023 | 2 | 1–1–0 | 1–0–0 def. A. Ewing 2 up | | 0–1-0 lost w/ A. Nordqvist 2 dn | 1 | 50.0 |
