= La Sella Open =

Professional golf tournament

Coordinates: 38.7045°N 0.04275°E

Tournament information
- Location: Alicante, Spain
- Established: 2023
- Course: La Sella Golf
- Par: 72
- Length: 5,647 m (6,176 yd)
- Tour: Ladies European Tour
- Format: Stroke play
- Prize fund: €1,000,000
- Month played: September

Current champion
- (England) Charlotte Heath

Location in Europe

The La Sella Open is a professional golf tournament on the Ladies European Tour, first played in 2023.

The inaugural tournament, held at La Sella Golf near Alicante in Spain the week before The Evian Championship, was one of 12 LET events in 2023 to feature a prize fund of at least $1 million.

== Winners ==
Year	Winner	Country	Score	To par	Margin of victory	Runner(s)-up	Winner's share (€)
2026	Charlotte Heath	England	68-65-73=206	–10	2 strokes	(Italy) Alessandra Fanali (England) Alice Hewson	150,000
2025	Anna Huang	Canada	64-66-69-69=268	–20	7 strokes	(France) Nastasia Nadaud	150,000
2024	Helen Briem	Germany	67-71-66-66=270	–18	2 strokes	(France) Pauline Roussin-Bouchard	150,000
2023	Nuria Iturrioz	Spain	68-70-67=205	–11	Playoff	(Germany) Laura Fünfstück	150,000
