= Charlotte Heath =

English amateur golfer

Personal information
- Nationality: England
- Born: 25 November 2001 (age 24)
- Height: 5 ft 4 in (1.63 m)

Career
- Sport: Golf
- College: Florida State University
- Turned professional: 2024
- Current tour: Ladies European Tour (joined 2026)
- Former tours: Epson Tour (2024); LET Access Series (2025)
- Professional wins: 1

Number of wins by tour
- Ladies European Tour: 1

Best results in LPGA major championships
- Chevron Championship: DNP
- Women's PGA C'ship: DNP
- U.S. Women's Open: DNP
- Women's British Open: T61: 2023
- Evian Championship: DNP

Charlotte Heath (born 25 November 2001) is an English professional golfer and Ladies European Tour player. She won the 2026 La Sella Open, and the Smyth Salver as the low amateur at the 2023 Women's British Open.

== Amateur career ==
Heath reached the semi-finals of the 2018 Girls Amateur Championship and won the 2020 Australian Women's Amateur against Indonesia's Mela Putri with a 7&6 score.

She graduated from Brighouse High School in 2020 and enrolled at Florida State University where she played with the Florida State Seminoles women's golf team until 2024. She played on the Arnold Palmer Cup team in 2022 and 2023.

Heath played in the 2021 and 2022 Curtis Cup and won the 2021 and 2022 European Ladies' Team Championship with England. She finished 4th at the 2021 Helen Holm Scottish Women's Open Championship and lost a playoff to Savannah De Bock at the 2022 European Ladies Amateur.

She tied for 7th at the 2023 NCAA Championship four strokes behind Rose Zhang, and won the Smyth Salver as the low amateur at the 2023 Women's British Open, having qualified as the leading British player in the World Amateur Golf Ranking, where her career-best rank was 7th.

== Professional career ==
Heath turned professional in June 2024 and made her professional debut at the FireKeepers Casino Hotel Championship on the Epson Tour, having secured status at Q-School the previous fall.

In 2025, she joined the LET Access Series, where she lost a playoff at the Madaëf Golfs Ladies Open in Morocco. After eight top-10 finishes, she finished 6th in the season rankings to graduate to the Ladies European Tour (LET) for 2026.

In 2026, Heath finished 4th at the Ford Women's NSW Open in her first LET start, before securing her maiden title at the La Sella Open.

== Amateur wins ==
- 2018 Sir Henry Cooper Junior Masters, Birkdale Putter
- 2020 Australian Women's Amateur
- 2022 Landfall Tradition

== Professional wins (1) ==
=== Ladies European Tour (1) ===
No.	Date	Tournament	Winning score	To par	Margin of victory	Runners-up
1	20 Sep 2026	La Sella Open	68-65-73=206	−10	2 strokes	(Italy) Alessandra Fanali, (England) Alice Hewson

== Playoff record ==
LET Access Series playoff record (0–1)

No.	Year	Tournament	Opponent	Result
1	2025	Madaëf Golfs Ladies Open	(England) Thalia Martin	Lost to par on fourth extra hole

== Results in LPGA majors ==
Tournament	2023
Chevron Championship	
Women's PGA Championship	
U.S. Women's Open	
The Evian Championship	
Women's British Open	T61LA

Did not play

LA = Low amateur
CUT = missed the half-way cut
"T" = tied

== Team appearances ==
- Girls Home Internationals (representing England): 2018 (winners), 2019 (winners)
- European Girls' Team Championship (representing England): 2019
- Women's Home Internationals (representing England): 2021 (winners)
- Curtis Cup (representing Great Britain & Ireland): 2021, 2022
- European Ladies' Team Championship (representing England): 2021 (winners), 2022 (winners), 2023
- Arnold Palmer Cup (representing the International Team): 2022 (winners), 2023
- Espirito Santo Trophy (representing England): 2022, 2023
- Vagliano Trophy: (representing Great Britain & Ireland): 2023
