= Lauren Holmey =

French professional golfer (born 1996)

Personal information
- Nationality: France
- Born: 12 January 2003 (age 23) Sèvres, France
- Height: 175 cm (5 ft 9 in)

Career
- Sport: Golf
- Turned professional: 2022
- Current tour: LET Access Series (joined 2022)
- Former tour: Ladies European Tour (joined 2023)
- Professional wins: 6

Achievements and awards
- Santander Golf Tour Order of Merit winner: 2025

Lauren Holmey (born 12 January 2003) is a former Dutch now French professional golfer and Ladies European Tour player.

== Amateur career ==
Holmey lives in Paris and holds both Dutch and French citizenship. She started playing golf at the age of 5.

She represented the Netherlands at the 2018 Youth Olympic Games in Argentina, competing against Grace Kim, Yuka Saso and Atthaya Thitikul. In 2019, she played in the European Young Masters and won the European Nations Cup - Copa Sotogrande with Romy Meekers and Zhen Bontan. She finished 19th with her team at the 2022 Espirito Santo Trophy, the World Amateur Team Championship, at Le Golf National.

Individually, Holmey was Dutch national champion several times.

== Professional career ==
Holmey joined the 2022 LET Access Series and turned professional in October after winning the Flumserberg Ladies Open in her first start. After recording runner-up finishes at the Hauts de France - Pas de Calais Golf Open, Trust Golf Links Series - Musselburgh and the Big Green Egg Swedish Matchplay Championship, she finished 5th in the season rankings to earn a full Ladies European Tour card for 2023. In her second LET start, she held the overnight lead at the 2023 Joburg Ladies Open, a stroke ahead of Alice Hewson and Smilla Tarning Sønderby.

In 2025, she won four tournaments on the Santander Golf Tour in Spain, topping the Order of Merit.

== Amateur wins ==
- 2017 Dutch National U21 Stroke Play Championship
- 2018 Grand Prix de Rebetz, Grand Prix D'Amiens
- 2020 Dutch National Stroke Play Championship

== Professional wins (6) ==
=== LET Access Series (2) ===
| No. | Date | Tournament | Winning score | To par | Margin of victory | Runner-up |
|---|---|---|---|---|---|---|
| 1 | 1 May 2022 | Flumserberg Ladies Open (as an amateur) | 68-70-70=208 | −8 | 1 stroke | (Germany) Patricia Isabel Schmidt |
| 2 | 7 Jun 2026 | Arkea Montauban Ladies Open | 71-71-68=210 | −6 | 1 stroke | (Australia) Kristalle Blum |

LET Access Series playoff record (0–1)

| No. | Year | Tournament | Opponent | Result |
|---|---|---|---|---|
| 1 | 2026 | Ladies Slovak Golf Open | (Slovakia) Michaela Vávrová | Lost to birdie on second extra hole |

=== Santander Golf Tour (4) ===
- 2025 Santander Golf Tour Girona, Santander Golf Tour Ávila, Santander Golf Tour La Coruña, Santander Golf Tour Sevilla (with Vanessa Knecht)

== Team appearances ==
Amateur

- Youth Olympic Games (representing the Netherlands): 2018
- European Young Masters (representing the Netherlands): 2019
- European Girls' Team Championship (representing the Netherlands): 2017, 2018, 2019, 2021
- European Ladies' Team Championship (representing the Netherlands): 2020, 2022
- European Nations Cup - Copa Sotogrande (representing the Netherlands): 2019 (winners), 2022
- Espirito Santo Trophy (representing the Netherlands): 2022
