= María Hernández (golfer) =

Spanish golfer (born 1986)

Personal information
- Full name: María Hernández Muñoz
- Nationality: Spain
- Born: 24 March 1986 (age 40) Pamplona, Spain
- Height: 5 ft 3 in (1.60 m)

Career
- Sport: Golf
- College: Purdue University
- Turned professional: 2009
- Current tour: Ladies European Tour (joined 2010)
- Former tour: LPGA Tour (2010–2018)
- Professional wins: 1

Number of wins by tour
- Ladies European Tour: 1

Best results in LPGA major championships
- Chevron Championship: T52: 2011
- Women's PGA C'ship: CUT: 2010, 2012, 2015
- U.S. Women's Open: T41: 2010
- Women's British Open: T14: 2010
- Evian Championship: CUT: 2015

Achievements and awards
- Big Ten Conference Player of the Year: 2007, 2008
- Purdue Female Athlete of the Year: 2008
- Honda Sports Award: 2008–09
- Big Ten Female Athlete of the Year: 2009
Medal record
Mediterranean Games
Gold medal – first place	2005 Almería	Individual
Gold medal – first place	2005 Almería	Women's team

María Hernández Muñoz (born 24 March 1986) is a Spanish professional golfer and Ladies European Tour player ho has played on the U.S.-based LPGA Tour. She won the 2010 Ladies Slovak Open and while at Purdue, she was the NCAA Individual Champion and won the Honda Sports Award.

== Amateur career ==
Hernández started playing golf at 12 and had a successful amateur career. An eight-year member of the Spanish National Team, Hernández is a five-time European Team Championship gold medalist, and earned a gold medal at the 2005 Mediterranean Games both individually and as a team. She won the 2003 Junior Solheim Cup and was runner-up at the 2004 European Ladies Amateur Championship and again in 2008, losing a playoff to Carlota Ciganda. She was a semi-finalist at The Women's Amateur Championship 2005 and 2006.

Hernández turned in a strong collegiate career at Purdue University, which was capped off with the 2009 NCAA Division I Individual Champion and NCAA Player of the Year award. She won 13 times while with the Purdue Boilermakers, and in 2008, she won the Big Ten Conference Championship and was named the Purdue Female Athlete of the Year. She is a two-time Big Ten Conference Player of the Year, both in 2007 and 2008, and a two-time All-American First Team selection.

== Professional career ==
Hernández turned professional in June 2009. She finished sixth at the LPGA Final Qualifying Tournament, earning her card for the 2010 LPGA Tour with ease. Her rookie season were also to be her most successful season. She won the Ladies Slovak Open on the Ladies European Tour and finished tied 14th in the 2010 Women's British Open, reaching a career peak of 112th place in the Women's World Golf Rankings.

Plagued by injuries, Hernández battled through spine and neck problems, a herniated disk, bacterial infections, ulcer on her colon, liver failure and other medical issues. She was forced to a break from golf, in danger of being crippled. She contracted a parasite in China, which the doctors couldn’t properly diagnose, and she kept getting sick over the next two years. The ulcer made her intolerant of fructose, glucose and gluten.

She was runner-up in the 2014 Lacoste Ladies Open de France, losing by one stroke to compatriot Azahara Muñoz. From 2019 she focused on the LET, where she was tied 3rd at the 2021 Estrella Damm Ladies Open and 2022 Joburg Ladies Open, before finishing runner-up at the 2023 Belgian Ladies Open, two strokes behind Patricia Isabel Schmidt.

In 2024, Hernández was runner-up at the Ladies Italian Open and Aramco Team Series – London, a stroke behind Leona Maguire, which helped her rise into the top-200 of the Women's World Golf Rankings again.

== Amateur wins ==
- 2003 Spanish Junior Girls Championship
- 2003 Spanish Girls Under 18 Championship
- 2004 Spanish Girls Under 18 Championship
- 2004 Spanish Ladies Closed Championship
- 2005 Mediterranean Games
- 2008 Big Ten Conference Championship
- 2009 NCAA Division I Women's Golf Championships

== Professional wins (1) ==
=== Ladies European Tour (1) ===
No.	Date	Tournament	Winning score	To par	Margin of victory	Runner-up	Winner's share (€)
1	30 May 2010	Ladies Slovak Open	72-69-69-70=280	−8	1 stroke	(Australia) Kristie Smith	52,500

== Team appearances ==
Amateur

- European Girls' Team Championship (representing Spain): 2002 (winners)
- European Lady Junior's Team Championship (representing Spain): 2004 (winners), 2006
- European Ladies' Team Championship (representing Spain): 2003 (winners), 2005 (winners), 2008
- Junior Solheim Cup (representing the Continent of Europe): 2002, 2003 (winners)
- Espirito Santo Trophy (representing Spain): 2004
- Mediterranean Games (representing Spain): 2005 (winners)
- Vagliano Trophy (representing the Continent of Europe): 2005
