= 2008 Espirito Santo Trophy =

Tournament information
- Dates: 8–11 October
- Location: Adelaide, South Australia, Australia; 34°55′44″S 138°36′4″E
- Courses: The Grange Golf Club (East and West courses)
- Organized by: International Golf Federation
- Format: 72 holes stroke play

Statistics
- Par: East: 73; West: 72
- Length: East: 6,260 yards (5,720 m); West: 6,149 yards (5,623 m)
- Field: 48 teams 144 players

Champion
- Sweden; Caroline Hedwall, Pernilla Lindberg, Anna Nordqvist
- 562 (−19)
- Location in Australia Location in South Australia

The 2008 Espirito Santo Trophy took place 8–11 October at The Grange Golf Club (East and West Course) in Adelaide, South Australia, Australia.

It was the 23rd women's golf World Amateur Team Championship for the Espirito Santo Trophy.

The tournament was a 72-hole stroke play team event. There were a tied record 48 team entries, each with three players.

Each team played two rounds at the East Course and two rounds at the West Course in different orders, but all leading teams played the fourth round at the West Course. The best two scores for each round counted towards the team total.

Sweden won the Trophy for their second title and the first wire-to-wire win seen in the championship in 18 years, beating team Spain by 12 strokes. Spain earned the silver medal while the United States team advanced, with two sub-70-scores in the last round, from fourth to third place and took the bronze medal another two strokes back.

With this championship, Sweden became the only team to have finished in the top-10 in all 23 editions of the Espirito Santo Trophy since the inaugural event in 1964.

The individual title went to 19-year-old Caroline Hedwall, Sweden, who, just as her team, lead wire-to-wire. Hedwall's score of 10-under-par, 280, was one stroke ahead of her teammate Anna Nordqvist. The third Swedish player, Pernilla Lindberg, finished 18th individually, despite none of her four rounds counted towards the team score.

== Teams ==
48 teams entered the event and completed the competition. Each team had three players.

Country	Players
Argentina	Martina Gavier, Maria Olivero, Maria Victoria Villanueva
Australia	Julia Boland, Clare Choi, Stephanie Na
Austria	Stefanie Endstrasser, Martina Hochwimmer, Marina Kotnik
Belgium	Valentine Gevers, Laura Gonzalez Escallon, Chloé Leurquin
Bermuda	Kim Botelho, Ebonie Burgess, Tariqah Walikraam
Brazil	Mariana de Biase, Patricia Carvalho, Karina Palmberg
Canada	Maude-Aimée LeBlanc, Kira Meixner, Stephanie Sherlock
Czech Republic	Veronika Holisová, Katerina Ružicková, Klára Spilková
Chile	Paz Echeverría, Macarena Silva, Soledad Ruiz Tagle
China	Li Jiayun, Xiao Yi, Luo Ying
Chinese Taipei	Yu-ling Hsieh, Tzu-chi Lin, Pei-ying Tsai
Colombia	Paola Moreno, Juliana Murcia, Mariajo Uribe
Cook Islands	Naomi George, Rotana Howard, Elmay Viking
Denmark	Malene Jørgensen, Therese Kølbæk, Charlotte Lorentzen
England	Elizabeth Bennett, Jodi Ewart, Rachel Jennings
Fiji	Sereana Phillipps, Selai Pridgeon, Kelera Watling
Finland	Satu Harju, Linda Henriksson, Rosa Svahn
France	Lucie André, Barbara Genuini, Audrey Goumard
Germany	Pia Halbig, Thea Hoffmeister, Caroline Masson
Greece	Kassandra Poole, Violetta Siozou, Chryssi Vafeiadi
Guatemala	Pamela Abreu, Maria Alejandra Camey, Katina Ruest
Hong Kong	Tiffany Chan, Demi Mak, Ginger Mak
Iceland	Helena Arnadottir, Tinna Johannsdottir, Eyglo Myrra Oskarsdottir
Ireland	Tara Delaney, Niamh Kitching, Danielle McVeigh
Italy	Marianna Causin, Alessia Knight, Giulia Molinaro
Japan	Asako Fujimoto, Mika Miyazato, Kaori Ohe
Latvia	Laura Jansone, Krista Puisite, Mara Puisite
Malaysia	Ainil Johani Bakar, Amanda Chin, Sharon Lau
Mexico	Diana Cantu, Alejandra Llaneza, Ana Alicia Malagon
Netherlands	Christel Boeljon, Marieke Nivard, Dewi Claire Schreefel
New Zealand	Cathryn Bristow, Dana Kim, Natasha Krishna
Norway	Tonje Daffinrud, Rachel Raastad, Amalie Valle
Philippines	Chihiro Ikeda, Lou Isabelle Manalo, Ana Tampinco
Portugal	Magda Carrilho, Ana Melo, Marta Vasconcelos
Puerto Rico	Lydia Benitez Colón, Patricia Garcia, Kyle Roig
Russia	Elizaveta Nikulina, Galina Rotmistrova, Anna Verchenova
Scotland	Krystle Caithness, Roseanne Niven, Kylie Walker
Singapore	Christabel Goh, Sock Hwee Koh, Stephanie Loi
Slovakia	Veronika Falathová, Barbora Kachlíková, Victoria Tomko
South Africa	Moniqué Smit, Iliska Verwey, Kim Williams
South Korea	Han Jung-eun, Heo Yoon-kyung, Yang Soo-jin
Spain	Carlota Ciganda, Belén Mozo, Azahara Muñoz
Sweden	Caroline Hedwall, Pernilla Lindberg, Anna Nordqvist
Switzerland	Anais Maggetti, Caroline Rominger, Fanny Vuignier
Thailand	Moriya Jutanugarn, Patcharajutar Kongkraphan, Pavarisa Yoktuan
Turkey	Necla Gerçek, Elcin Ulu, Selin Özgür
United States	Amanda Blumenherst, Tiffany Joh, Alison Walshe
Wales	Sahra Hassan, Breanne Loucks, Rhian Wyn Thomas

== Results ==
Place	Country	Score	To par
1st place, gold medalist(s)	Sweden	137-138-147-139=561	−19
2nd place, silver medalist(s)	Spain	145-138-150-140=573	−7
3rd place, bronze medalist(s)	United States	152-144-142-137=575	−5
4	Canada	147-148-147-141=583	+3
5	Japan	146-147-143-148=584	+4
6	Germany	148-150-145-142=585	+5
7	England	149-147-150-140=586	+6
T8	Denmark	149-149-145-144=587	+7
T8	Netherlands	150-142-148-147=587	+7
10	South Africa	147-143-150-148=588	+8
T11	Scotland	147-154-146-145=592	+12
T11	South Korea	150-151-151-140=592	+12
13	Austria	149-156-144-144=593	+13
14	Colombia	151-149-146-148=594	+14
T15	Australia	149-149-149-148=595	+15
T15	France	148-150-152-145=595	+15
T17	Argentina	154-155-144-143=596	+16
T17	Switzerland	152-150-146-148=596	+16
19	Philippines	156-152-143-148=599	+19
20	Norway	154-146-153-148=601	+21
T21	New Zealand	147-153-151-152=603	+23
T21	Thailand	161-152-143-147=603	+23
23	Wales	155-147-151-151=604	+24
24	Ireland	149-154-153-150=606	+26
T25	Belgium	162-145-149-151=607	+27
T25	Brazil	149-146-161-151=607	+27
T25	Finland	160-148-151-148=607	+27
28	Czech Republic	155-153-159-141=608	+28
29	Latvia	154-154-153-149=610	+30
T30	Italy	151-156-149-155=611	+31
T30	Mexico	152-151-157-151=611	+31
32	Chinese Taipei	151-156-154-151=612	+32
33	Puerto Rico	155-156-151-152=614	+34
34	Chile	152-160-155-148=615	+35
35	China	156-162-152-150=620	+40
36	Russia	153-158-165-146=622	+42
37	Malaysia	158-159-154-152=623	+43
38	Portugal	155-161-155-154=625	+45
39	Guatemala	159-159-156-155=629	+49
40	Hong Kong	165-155-155-156=631	+51
41	Iceland	163-156-157-161=637	+57
42	Singapore	159-166-160-155=640	+60
43	Bermuda	171-158-158-154=641	+61
44	Turkey	162-173-153-158=646	+66
45	Slovakia	163-157-163-168=651	+71
46	Cook Islands	159-167-164-165=655	+75
47	Greece	170-168-170-163=671	+91
48	Fiji	185-190-175-180=730	+150

== Individual leaders ==
There was no official recognition for the lowest individual scores.

Place	Player	Country	Score	To par
1	Caroline Hedwall	Sweden	67-70-73-70=280	−10
2	Anna Nordqvist	Sweden	70-68-74-69=281	−9
3	Azahara Muñoz	Spain	71-72-74-70=287	−3
4	Maude-Aimée LeBlanc	Canada	73-75-71-69=288	−2
5	Christel Boeljon	Netherlands	77-68-70-74=289	−1
T6	Krystle Caithness	Scotland	71-73-71-75=290	E
T6	Jodi Ewart	England	73-72-75-70=290	E
T6	Caroline Masson	Germany	75-74-71-70=290	E
T6	Mariajo Uribe	Colombia	73-73-72-72=290	E
T6	Alison Walshe	United States	78-73-69-70=290	E
