= Kylie Henry =

Scottish golfer

Personal information
- Full name: Kylie Walker Henry
- Nationality: Scotland
- Born: 30 August 1986 (age 40) Glasgow, Scotland
- Height: 1.72 m (5 ft 7 1/2 in)
- Spouse: Scott Henry (m. 2016)

Career
- Sport: Golf
- Turned professional: 2010
- Current tours: Ladies European Tour; Sunshine Ladies Tour
- Professional wins: 4

Number of wins by tour
- Ladies European Tour: 2
- WPGA Tour of Australasia: 1
- Other: 1

Best results in LPGA major championships
- Chevron Championship: DNP
- Women's PGA C'ship: DNP
- U.S. Women's Open: CUT: 2015
- Women's British Open: T44: 2023
- Evian Championship: CUT: 2014

Kylie Walker Henry (born 30 August 1986) is a Scottish professional golfer. She won her first Ladies European Tour title at the Deloitte Ladies Open in Amsterdam in May 2014. She played under her maiden name Kylie Walker until her marriage to golfer Scott Henry in late 2016.

== Amateur career ==
Walker had a successful amateur career, representing Great Britain and Ireland in the 2009 Vagliano Trophy, twice winning the St Rule Trophy and winning the 2008 Scottish Ladies’ Golfing Association Order of Merit. She turned professional at the beginning of 2010 after finishing 9th in the LET Qualifying School at the end of 2009.

== Professional career ==
2010 was Walker’s rookie season as a professional on the Ladies European Tour. She had two top-10 finishes, finishing tied for 8th at the Finnair Masters and at the Suzhou Taihu Ladies Open. In 2011, she recorded three top-10 finishes including 4th at the Raiffeisenbank Prague Golf Masters and 5th at the Ladies Scottish Open. Walker also appeared at her first Women's British Open, making the cut and finishing tied for 59th. In 2012, her best finish was 10th at the Ladies Scottish Open.

In January 2014, Walker won her first professional tournament, on the ALPG Tour at the Renault Ladies Pro-Am in Australia. In May 2014, Walker gained her first victory on the Ladies European Tour at the Dutch Ladies Open in Amsterdam after a play-off. In July 2014, she won her second LET title, the Ladies German Open after a play-off with Charley Hull, having equalled the LET low score record for 36 holes and broken the 54-hole record during the tournament.

== Personal life ==
She is married to Challenge Tour golfer Scott Henry. They competed against each other in the Jordan Mixed Open.

== Professional wins (4) ==
=== Ladies European Tour (2) ===
No.	Date	Tournament	Winning score	To par	Margin of victory	Runner-up
1	25 May 2014	Deloitte Ladies Open	69-72-72=213	−6	Playoff	(Australia) Nikki Campbell, (Denmark) Malene Jørgensen
2	20 Jul 2014	Ladies German Open	64-64-64-71=263	−25	Playoff	(England) Charley Hull

LET playoff record (2–0)

No.	Year	Tournament	Opponent	Result
1	2014	Deloitte Ladies Open	(Australia) Nikki Campbell, (Denmark) Malene Jørgensen	Won with birdie on first extra hole
1	2014	Ladies German Open	(England) Charley Hull	Won with par on first extra hole

=== Sunshine Ladies Tour (1) ===
No.	Date	Tournament	Winning score	To par	Margin of victory	Runner-up
1	18 Feb 2024	Dimension Data Ladies Pro-Am	72-70-71=213	−3	2 strokes	(South Africa) Lee-Anne Pace

=== ALPG wins (1) ===
- 2014 Renault Ladies Pro-Am

== Team appearances ==
Amateur

- Espirito Santo Trophy (representing Scotland): 2008
- European Ladies' Team Championship (representing Scotland): 2008, 2009
- Vagliano Trophy (representing Great Britain & Ireland): 2009
