= Dallas Baptist Patriots =

- University: Dallas Baptist University
- Nickname: Patriots
- NCAA: Division II; Division I (baseball)
- Conference: Lone Star (primary); Pac-12 (baseball only)
- Athletic director: Matt Duce
- Location: Dallas, Texas
- Varsity teams: 13 (7 men's, 6 women's)
- Basketball arena: Burg Center
- Baseball stadium: Horner Ballpark
- Soccer stadium: Patriot Soccer Field
- Tennis venue: Patriot Tennis Pavilion
- Other venues: Sedwick Soccer Field House
- Colors: Red, white, and blue
- Mascot: Mr Patriot
- Website: dbupatriots.com

The Dallas Baptist Patriots are the 15 athletic teams that represent the Dallas Baptist University, located in Dallas, Texas, in NCAA intercollegiate sports. All of the varsity Patriot athletic teams compete at the Division II level with the exception of the baseball team, which plays in Division I. DBU Athletics also sponsors five club programs including; cheer, dance, bass fishing, lacrosse, and ice hockey. As such, all athletic teams, except for baseball, compete in the Lone Star Conference while the baseball program is an associate member of the Pac-12 Conference. All intercollegiate athletic teams also hold membership in the National Christian College Athletic Association (NCCAA).

== Athletic program ==
The school's athletic department features a Christ-centered discipleship program, as a part of the mission to develop "Champions for Christ". DBU athletics also launched the Global Sports Mission Initiative in 2007 to allow student-athletes the opportunity to share the love of Christ, while using their God-given athletic talents and gifts to minister and spread the Word of God abroad. The Global Sports Mission Initiative was created as a vision by Patriot athletics and the DBU Global Missions Department and has included trips to Guatemala, Peru, Dominican Republic, South Korea, England, Brazil, Chile, Liberia, Scotland, China, Honduras, and Curacao, with plans for more trips in the near future.

Over the last several years, facility additions have been made to the athletic department, including the construction of the Sadler Patriot Clubhouse, Patriot Athletic Guesthouse, Sedwick Soccer Fieldhouse, Joan and Andy Horner Ballpark, and the Athletic Training Center.

The women's golf team won the NCAA Division II Women's Golf Championships in 2021, 2023, 2025.

The Cheer program has won three straight NCA National Titles in Daytona Beach, Florida, in 2021, 2022, and 2023.

== Varsity teams ==
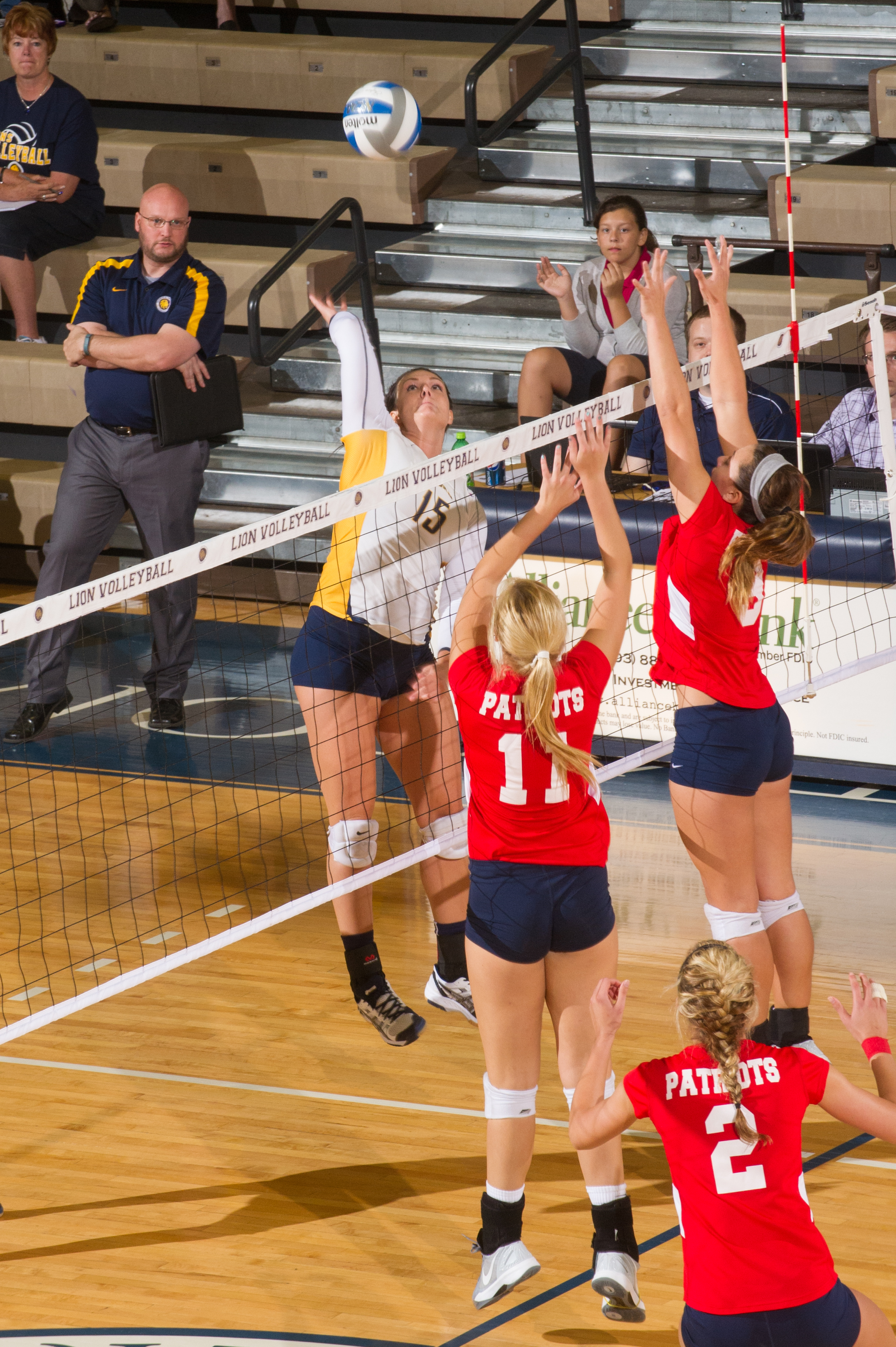
The Patriots women's volleyball team in action against the Texas A&M–Commerce Lions in 2013

Dallas Baptist University sponsors teams in seven men's and six women's NCAA sanctioned sports. STUNT was introduced in 2023 as well as five club sports.

Men's sports	Women's sports
Baseball^{1}	Cross country
Basketball	Golf
Cross country	Soccer
Golf	Tennis
Soccer	Track and field
Tennis	Volleyball
Track and field	
^{1} – competes in Division I as an affiliate member of the Pac-12 Conference.

== Club sports ==
Dallas Baptist's club sports include bass fishing, bowling, esports, ice hockey, lacrosse, tennis, and table tennis.

== National championships ==
=== Team ===
Sport	Assoc.	Division	Year	Rival	Score
Track and field (men's) (indoor)	NAIA	Single	1972	Prairie View A&M	
Cheer	NCA	All-Girl	2021	Valdosta State	
Cheer	NCA	All-Girl	2022	Slippery Rock University	
Cheer	NCA	All-Girl	2023	Davenport University	
Cheer	NCA	All-Girl	2024	Oklahoma Baptist	
Golf (women's)	NCAA	II	2021	Lynn University	2.5–2.5 (tie-breaker)
Golf (women's)	NCAA	II	2023	Nova Southeastern University	3–2
Golf (women's)	NCAA	II	2025	University of Central Missouri	4–1
Golf (women's)	NCAA	II	2026	Anderson University	5–0
