= Nova Southeastern Sharks women's golf =

The NSU Sharks Women's Golf team represents Nova Southeastern University in Davie, Florida. They currently compete in the Sunshine State Conference.

== History ==
Women's golf started in 1998 for the NSU Sharks. The team competed competitively for the first five years, but never made a stride for a championship. Starting in the 2003–2004 season the team made strides. They slowly worked their way towards the top of the SSC and NCAA Division II.

In 2007–08 season the women finished in second at the NCAA Division II Championship. They were 8 strokes behind conference mate Rollins College. They redeemed the tough defeat in 2008–09 season by winning the national championship, first for women's golf, by 15 strokes over Grand Valley State University. They would win the championship again in each of the next three years.

Four golfers have won the NCAA Division II individual title: Sandra Changkija (2010), Taylor Collins (2011), Abbey Gittings (2012), and Olivia Gronborg (2023).
