= 2008 European Ladies' Team Championship =

Golf competition

Tournament information
- Dates: 8–12 July 2008
- Location: Stenungsund, Sweden; 58°01′20″N 11°52′10″E
- Course: Stenungsund Golf Club
- Organized by: European Golf Association
- Format: 36 holes stroke play Knock-out match-play

Statistics
- Par: 72
- Field: 16 teams 96 players

Champion
- Sweden; Anna Nordqvist, Caroline Hedwall, Jacqueline Hedwall, Caroline Westrup, Pernilla Lindberg, Camilla Lennarth
- Qualification round: 717 (−3); Final match 5–2

Location map
- Location in Europe Location in Sweden Location in Västra Götaland County

The 2008 European Ladies' Team Championship took place 8–12 July at Stenungsund Golf Club in Stenungsund, Sweden. It was the 26th women's golf amateur European Ladies' Team Championship.

== Venue ==
The hosting Stenungsund Golf Club was founded in 1989. The 18-hole course, with the character of a links course with large undulated greens, situated in Spekeröd, Stenungsund Municipality, 2 kilometres from the sea and 35 kilometres north of Gothenburg, Sweden, was designed by Peter Nordwall. The second nine holes opened in 1990.

The championship course was set up with par 72.

== Format ==
All participating teams played two qualification rounds of stroke-play with six players, counted the five best scores for each team.

The eight best teams formed flight A, in knock-out match-play over the next three days. The teams were seeded based on their positions after the stroke-play. The first placed team was drawn to play the quarter-final against the eight placed team, the second against the seventh, the third against the sixth and the fourth against the fifth. In each match between two nation teams, two 18-hole foursome games and five 18-hole single games were played. Teams were allowed to switch players during the team matches, selecting other players in to the afternoon single games after the morning foursome games. Teams knocked out after the quarter-finals played one foursome game and four single games in each of their remaining matches. Games all square after 18 holes were declared halved, if the team match was already decided.

The eight teams placed 9–16 in the qualification stroke-play formed flight B, to play similar knock-out match-play, with one foursome game and four single games to decide their final positions.

== Teams ==
16 nation teams contested the event. Each team consisted of six players.

Players in the teams

Country	Players
Austria	Stefanie Endstrasser, Cristina Gugler, Martina Hochwimmer, Marina Kotnik, Nina Mühl, Christine Wolf
Belgium	Valentine Gevers, Emilie Geury, Laura Gonzalez Escallon, Chloé Leurquin, Tamara Luccioli, Manon Vanmol
Denmark	Monica Christiansen, Malene Jørgensen, Therese Kølbæk, Line Vedel Hansen, Trine Mortensen, Maja S. Nielsen
England	Elizabeth Bennett, Naomi Edwards, Jodi Ewart, Rachel Jennings, Florentyna Parker, Kerry Smith
Finland	Satu Harju, Linda Henriksson, Elina Ikävalko, Annika Korkeila, Elina Nummenpää, Rosa Svahn
France	Lucie André, Isabelle Boineau, Valentine Derrey, Barbara Genuini, Morgane Bazin de Jessey, Joanna Klatten
Germany	Pia Halbig, Thea Hoffmeister, Nina Holleder, Lara Katzy, Stephanie Kirchmayr, Caroline Masson
Ireland	Dawn Marie Conaty, Tara Delaney, Niamh Kitching, Danielle McVeigh, Maura Morrin, Gillian O'Leary,
Italy	Alessandra Averna, Maranna Causin, Alessandra de Poli de Luigi, Camilla Patussi, Anna Roscio, Valeria Tandrini
Netherlands	Christel Boeljon, Myrte Eikenaar, Kyra Van Leeuwen, Marieke Nivard, Dewi Claire Schreefel, Chrisje de Vries
Norway	Karinn Dickinson, Marita Engzelius, Cesilie Hagen, Lene H. Mørch, Rachel Raastad, Amalie Valle
Scotland	Krystle Caithness, Louise Kenney, Laura Murray, Pamela Pretswell, Michele Thomson, Kylie Walker
Spain	Carlota Ciganda, María Hernández, Belén Mozo, Azahara Muñoz, Ane Urchegui, Adriana Zwanck
Sweden	Anna Nordqvist, Caroline Hedwall, Jacqueline Hedwall, Caroline Westrup, Pernilla Lindberg, Camilla Lennarth
Switzerland	Niloufar Aazam, Nadine Grüter, Melanie Mätzler, Caroline Rominger, Fabia Rothenfluh, Natalia Tanno
Wales	Stephanie Evans, Sahra Hassan, Hannah Jenkins, Breanne Loucks, Kirsty O'Connor, Rhian Wyn Thomas

== Winners ==
Team England lead the opening 36-hole qualifying competition, with a score of 14 under par 706, three strokes ahead of defending champions team Spain.

Individual leader in the 36-hole stroke-play competition was Jodi Ewart, England, with a score of 9 under par 135, four strokes ahead of four players on tied second place.

Host nation Sweden won the championship, beating team Netherlands 5–2 in the final and earned their fifth title. For the first time in the history of the championship, a pair of twins was part of the winning team, as 19-years-old Caroline and Jacqueline Hedwall played for team Sweden. So did also future professional major winners Pernilla Lindberg and Anna Nordqvist.

Team Spain earned third place, beating England 6–1 in the bronze match.

== Results ==
Qualification round

Team standings

Place	Country	Score	To par
1	England	354-352=706	−14
2	Spain	353-356=709	−11
T3	Sweden *	363-354=717	−3
T3	Netherlands	365-352=717	−3
T5	Austria *	362-365=727	+7
T5	France *	370-357=727	+7
T5	Scotland	376-351=727	+7
8	Denmark	362-369=731	+11
9	Wales	377-359=736	+16
10	Germany	369-370=739	+19
11	Switzerland	377-369=746	+26
12	Belgium	379-368=747	+27
13	Norway	383-365=748	+28
14	Ireland	379-370=749	+29
15	Italy	384-372=756	+36
16	Finland	382-380=762	+42

* Note: In the event of a tie the order was determined by the better total non-counting scores.

Individual leaders

Place	Player	Country	Score	To par
1	Jodi Ewart	England	66-69=135	−9
T2	Christel Boeljon	Netherlands	69-70=139	−5
T2	Caroline Hedwall	Sweden	68-71=139	−5
T2	Breanne Loucks	Wales	73-66=139	−5
T2	Adriana Zwanck	Spain	70-69=139	−5
T6	Carlota Ciganda	Spain	71-69=140	−4
T6	Naomi Edwards	England	71-69=140	−4
T6	Rachel Jennings	England	69-71=140	−4
T6	Therese Kølbæk	Denmark	70-70=140	−4
T6	Azahara Muñoz	Spain	70-70=140	−4
T6	Marieke Nivard	Netherlands	70-70= 140	−4

Note: There was no official award for the lowest individual score.

Flight A

Bracket

Quarter finals
Spain	5.5
Scotland	1.5
Sweden	6
France	1
Netherlands	6
Austria	1
England	6.5
Denmark	0.5

Semi finals
Sweden	4
Spain	3
Netherlands	4
England	3

Final
Sweden	5
Netherlands	2
Bronze match
Spain	6
England	1

Elimination matches
France	3
Scotland	2
Denmark	3
Austria	2

Match for 5th place
Denmark	4
France	1
Match for 7th place
Scotland	4
Austria	1

Final games

Sweden	Netherlands
5	2
P. Lindberg / C. Hedwall 5 & 4	C.Boeljon / D.C. Schreefel
A. Nordqvist / C. Westrup 6 & 4	M. Nivard / K. Van Leeuwen
Caroline Hedwall 5 & 4	Christel Boeljon
Pernilla Lindberg	Chrisje De Vries 2 & 1
Camilla Lennarth 4 & 2	Kyra Van Leeuwen
Caroline Westrup AS *	Dewi Claire Schreefel AS *
Anna Nordqvist AS *	Marieke Nivard AS *

* Note: Game declared halved, since team match already decided.

Flight B

Bracket

Round 1
Germany	4
Italy	1
Switzerland	3
Ireland	2
Norway	3
Belgium	2
Wales	4
Finland	1

Round 2
Germany	4.5
Switzerland	0.5
Norway	4
Wales	1

Match for 9th place
Germany	4
Norway	1
Match for 11th place
Wales	4
Switzerland	1

Elimination matches
Italy	3
Ireland	2
Belgium	3.5
Finland	1.5

Match for 13th place
Italy	3
Belgium	2
Match for 15th place
Ireland	3
Finland	2

Final standings

Place	Country
1st place, gold medalist(s)	Sweden
2nd place, silver medalist(s)	Netherlands
3rd place, bronze medalist(s)	Spain
4	England
5	Denmark
6	France
7	Scotland
8	Austria
9	Germany
10	Norway
11	Wales
12	Switzerland
13	Italy
14	Belgium
15	Ireland
16	Finland

== See also ==
- Espirito Santo Trophy – biennial world amateur team golf championship for women organized by the International Golf Federation.
- European Amateur Team Championship – European amateur team golf championship for men organised by the European Golf Association.
