= 2024 Sunshine Ladies Tour =

11th season of the Sunshine Ladies Tour

2024 Sunshine Ladies Tour season
- Duration: 16 February 2024 – 28 April 2024
- Number of official events: 8
- Order of Merit Winner: (England) Gabriella Cowley

The 2024 Sunshine Ladies Tour was the 11th season of the Sunshine Ladies Tour, a series of professional golf tournaments for women based in South Africa.

== Schedule ==
The season consisted of 8 events, all held in South Africa, played between February and April.

The Dimension Data Ladies Pro-Am, played concurrent with the Sunshine Tour and Challenge Tour's co-sanctioned Dimension Data Pro-Am, kept its elevated R2.5m purse.

Standard Bank, which in 2023 had sponsored an event at Royal Johannesburg & Kensington Golf Club, shifted its sponsorship to Cape Town, and the Cape Town Ladies Open at Royal Cape Golf Club became the Standard Bank Ladies Open hosted by the City of Cape Town.

The Investec South African Women's Open and the Joburg Ladies Open were again co-sanctioned with the Ladies European Tour.

Date	Tournament	Venue	Winner	Purse (ZAR)	Notes
18 Feb	Dimension Data Ladies Pro-Am	Fancourt Country Club	(Scotland) Kylie Henry	2,500,000	Pro-Am
23 Feb	SuperSport Ladies Challenge	Lost City Golf Club	(India) Tvesa Malik	1,300,000	
8 Mar	Fidelity ADT Ladies Challenge	Blue Valley Golf Estate	(Germany) Helen Kreuzer	250,000	New tournament
15 Mar	Standard Bank Ladies Open	Royal Cape Golf Club	(South Africa) Gabrielle Venter	600,000	
6 Apr	ABSA Ladies Invitational	Serengeti Golf and Wildlife Estate	(South Africa) Casandra Alexander	1,200,000	New tournament
12 Apr	Jabra Ladies Classic	Glendower Golf Club	(South Africa) Cara Gorlei	1,000,000	
21 Apr	Joburg Ladies Open	Modderfontein Golf Club	(Switzerland) Chiara Tamburlini	€300,000	Co-sanctioned with the Ladies European Tour
28 Apr	Investec South African Women's Open	Erinvale Golf Club	(Belgium) Manon De Roey	€320,000	Co-sanctioned with the Ladies European Tour

== Order of Merit ==
This shows the leaders in the final Order of Merit.

Rank	Player	Points
1	(England) Gabriella Cowley	1,173
2	(South Africa) Nicole Garcia	1,012
3	(Scotland) Kylie Henry	951
4	(South Africa) Cara Gorlei	902
5	(South Africa) Lee-Anne Pace	897
