= Madelene Stavnar =

Norwegian professional golfer (born 2000)

Personal information
- Nationality: Norway
- Born: 9 December 2000 (age 25) Tønsberg, Norway
- Height: 5 ft 4 in (163 cm)

Career
- Sport: Golf
- Turned professional: 2017
- Current tour: Ladies European Tour (joined 2017)
- Former tours: LET Access Series; Swedish Golf Tour

Madelene Stavnar (born 9 December 2000) is a Norwegian professional golfer playing on the Ladies European Tour (LET). She joined the LET in 2017 at only 16 years of age. In 2022, she was on the winning team at the Aramco Team Series – London. She was runner-up at the 2023 VP Bank Swiss Ladies Open and the 2025 ABSA Ladies Invitational.

== Amateur career ==
In 2016, Stavnar reached the quarter finals of the Girls Amateur Championship at Royal St David's and finished 6th at the French Ladies Amateur, the Internationaux de France - Trophée Cécile de Rothschild. She appeared for the Norwegian national team at the European Girls' Team Championship in Oslo and the World Junior Girls Championship in Canada.

== Professional career ==
Stavnar joined the Ladies European Tour in 2017 after finishing 9th at Q School in December 2016, when she was only 16 years old. In her rookie season, she traveled with a guardian and in eight starts her best finish was a tie for 19th at the Sanya Ladies Open in China. She struggled to establish herself and returned to Q School several times over the next five seasons, also participating in tournaments on the LET Access Series, Swedish Golf Tour and Sunshine Ladies Tour.

In 2022, she tied for 7th at the Investec South African Women's Open and was on the winning team at the Aramco Team Series – London. Teamed with Nicole Garcia and Kelly Whaley, they shot 27-under-par and beat a team made up of Ursula Wikström, Julia Engström and María Hernández in a playoff.

In 2023, she was in contention for a maiden LET win at the VP Bank Swiss Ladies Open, taking a two-shot lead ahead of Anne-Charlotte Mora and Alexandra Försterling into the final round, ultimately finishing runner-up.

Stavnar was runner-up at the 2025 ABSA Ladies Invitational in South Africa, trailing the winner by two strokes after she double-bogeyed the 18th hole.

== Team appearances ==
Amateur

- European Girls' Team Championship (representing Norway): 2016
- World Junior Girls Championship (representing Norway): 2016
