= White Horse Whisky Challenge =

Tournament information
- Location: Burnham, Buckinghamshire, England
- Established: 1980
- Course: Burnham Beeches Golf Club
- Tour: Ladies European Tour
- Format: Stroke play
- Prize fund: £10,000
- Final year: 1984

Final champion
- (Italy) Federica Dassù

Location map
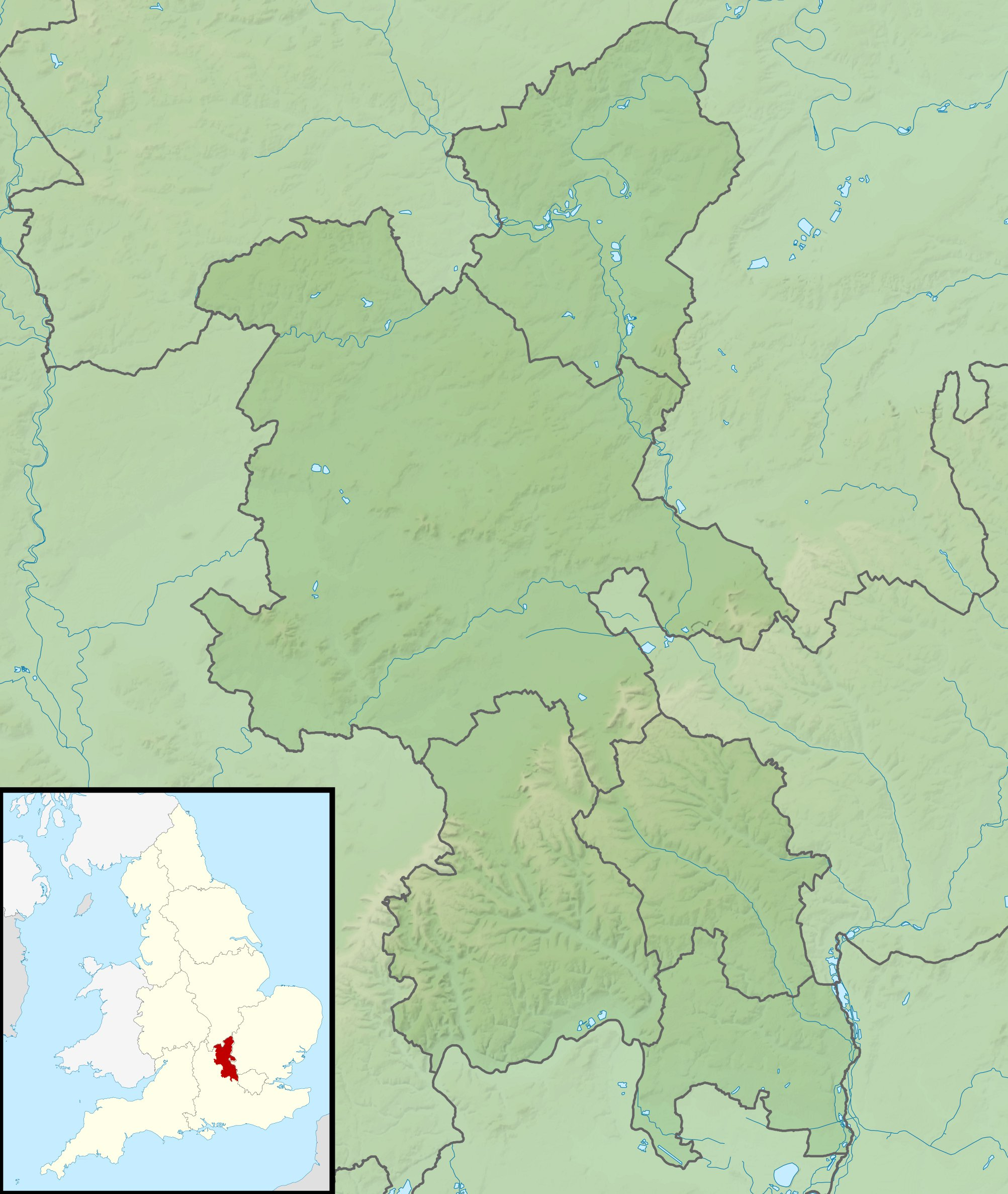
- Location in England Location in Buckinghamshire

The White Horse Whisky Challenge was a women's professional golf tournament on the Ladies European Tour held near London in England.

== History ==
In 1980 the tournament was held at Finchley Golf Club in the London Borough of Barnet, and in 1981 at Dyrham Park Golf Club in the same borough. In 1983, it was played at Selsdon Park in Croydon, south London, and in 1984 at Burnham Beeches Golf Club near Slough west of central London.

== Winners ==
Year	Winner	Score	Margin of victory	Runner-up	Winner's share (£)	Venue	Ref
White Horse Whisky Challenge
1984	(Italy) Federica Dassù	283 (−5)	1 stroke	(England) Kitrina Douglas (England) Debbie Dowling (Scotland) Dale Reid	1,500	Burnham Beeches GC	
1983	(England) Beverly Huke	207 (−12)	1 stroke	(Scotland) Muriel Thomson	600	Selsdon Park GC	
Dunhill Classic
1982	(England) Bridget Cooper	147 (−3)	7 strokes	(United States) Lori West (Scotland) Cathy Panton	900	Woburn G&CC (Duke's Course)	
Sports Space Championship
1981	(England) Jenny Lee Smith	72 (−1)	2 strokes	(England) Christine Langford (Scotland) Cathy Panton	600	Dyrham Park GC	
Robert Winsor Productions Championship
1980	(England) Jenny Lee Smith	146 (−2)	1 stroke	(England) Jane Panter (Scotland) Muriel Thomson	350	Finchley GC	
