= Laing Ladies Charity Classic =

Tournament information
- Location: Stoke Poges, England
- Established: 1985
- Course: Stoke Poges GC
- Tour: Ladies European Tour
- Format: 72-hole Stroke play
- Final year: 1990

Tournament record score
- Aggregate: 274 Debbie Dowling
- To par: −18 As above

Final champion
- (South Africa) Laurette Maritz

The Laing Ladies Charity Classic was a women's professional golf tournament on the Ladies European Tour held in England. It was first played in 1985 and held annually until 1990.

== Winners ==
Year	Winner	Country	Score	Margin of victory	Runner(s)-up
1990	Laurette Maritz	South Africa	275 (−13)	Playoff	(England) Alison Nicholas
1989	Laura Davies	England	276 (−16)	3 strokes	(Scotland) Dale Reid (Scotland) Jane Connachan (Australia) Corinne Dibnah (United States) Susan Moon
1988	Marie-Laure de Lorenzi-Taya	France	203	7 strokes	(England) Caroline Griffiths
1987	Alison Nicholas	England	281	2 strokes	(Australia) Corinne Dibnah
1986	Debbie Dowling	England	274 (−18)	1 stroke	(Australia) Corinne Dibnah
1985	Muriel Thomson	Scotland	282 (−10)	1 stroke	(England) Vanessa Marvin (England) Beverly Huke
