= Carlsberg European Ladies' Championship =

Tournament information
- Location: England (21); Scotland (4); Wales (1)
- Established: 1979
- Tour(s): Ladies European Tour
- Format: 36-hole stroke play (1979–1980); 54-hole stroke play (1981)
- Final year: 1981

The Carlsberg European Ladies' Championship was a series of women's professional golf tournaments on the Ladies European Tour (LET) held throughout England, Scotland and Wales between 1979 and 1981.

In 1978 Carlsberg became the main sponsor of the newly formed Women's Professional Golfers' Association (WPGA), supporting 12 tournaments in 1979, 10 in 1980 and 4 in 1981. The winner's share per tournament was £200, £250 and £1,500 respectively for the three seasons. Initially a 36-hole stroke play event, it was extended to 54-hole stroke play in 1981.

Carlsberg ended their sponsorship after the 1981 season.

== Winners ==
"Date" is the ending date of the tournament. The numbers in brackets after multiple winners' names show the number of Carlsberg tournament wins they had up to and including that event.

Year	#	Date	Venue	Location	Winner	Score	Margin of victory	Runner(s)–up
1979	1	27 Apr	Tyrrells Wood	England	(United States) Mollie Anderson	145 (+1)	3 strokes	(England) Jane Chapman
1979	2	4 May	Willingdon	England	(Scotland) Cathy Panton	151 (+5)	1 stroke	(Sweden) Kärstin Ehrnlund (England) Christine Langford
1979	3	11 May	Long Ashton	England	(England) Christine Langford	73 (−2)	2 strokes	(Sweden) Kärstin Ehrnlund (England) Vanessa Marvin
1979	4	18 May	Baberton	Scotland	(England) Joanna Smurthwaite	147 (+1)	2 strokes	(England) Jane Panter
1979	5	25 May	Whitecraigs	Scotland	(England) Christine Langford (2)	142 (−4)	4 strokes	(South Africa) Alison Sheard
1979	6	1 Jun	Coventry	England	(England) Jane Panter	146 (−2)	1 stroke	(Scotland) Cathy Panton
1979	7	8 Jun	South Staffs	England	(England) Vanessa Marvin	143 (−3)	5 strokes	(Sweden) Kärstin Ehrnlund
1979	8	15 Jun	Ballater	Scotland	(England) Beverly Huke	146 (−2)	1 stroke	(England) Jane Panter (Scotland) Muriel Thomson (England) Mickey Walker
1979	9	22 Jun	St Annes Old Links	England	(England) Christine Langford (3)	148 (+2)	Playoff	(England) Jenny Lee Smith
1979	10	29 Jun	York	England	(England) Mickey Walker	140 (−2)	1 stroke	(South Africa) Alison Sheard
1979	11	6 Jul	Sand Moor	England	(South Africa) Alison Sheard	147 (+1)	3 strokes	(England) Christine Langford (Scotland) Cathy Panton
1979	12	13 Jul	Arcot Hall	England	(England) Jenny Lee Smith	140 (−2)	3 strokes	(Scotland) Muriel Thomson
1980	1	2 May	Tyrrells Wood	England	(Scotland) Muriel Thomson	141 (−3)	2 strokes	(England) Jane Panter
1980	2	9 May	Queen's Park	England	(England) Christine Trew	150 (+2)	5 strokes	(Scotland) Muriel Thomson
1980	3	23 May	Blairgowrie	England	(England) Beverly Huke (2)	144 (−8)	7 strokes	(United States) Susan Moon (England) Christine Sharp
1980	4	30 May	Gleddoch House	Scotland	(Scotland) Wilma Aitken (a)	147 (+3)	2 strokes	(England) Vanessa Marvin (England) Joanna Smurthwaite
1980	5	13 Jun	Knowle	England	(England) Christine Langford (4)	142 (−6)	1 stroke	(England) Sue Bamford
1980	6	4 Jul	Finham Park	England	(Scotland) Dale Reid	139 (−9)	7 strokes	(Scotland) Cathy Panton (England) Joanne Smurthwaite
1980	7	11 Jul	Arcot Hall	England	(England) Maxine Burton	144 (+2)	2 strokes	(Scotland) Dale Reid
1980	8	8 Aug	Shifnal	England	(England) Jenny Lee Smith (2)	142	1 stroke	(England) Mickey Walker
1980	9	15 Aug	Sand Moor	England	(England) Christine Trew (2)	148 (+2)	Playoff	(Scotland) Muriel Thomson
1980	10	3 Oct	Tyrrells Wood	England	(England) Ruth Barry	140 (−4)	3 strokes	(England) Maxine Burton (United States) Susan Moon
1981	1	1 May	St Pierre	Wales	(England) Mickey Walker (2)	222 (+6)	2 strokes	(England) Sue Latham
1981	2	22 May	Queen's Park	England	(Scotland) Cathy Panton (2)	223 (+1)	1 stroke	(England) Christine Langford
1981	3	19 Jun	Moortown	England	(Scotland) Cathy Panton (3)	213 (−9)	3 strokes	(England) Jenny Lee Smith
1981	4	14 Aug	Gleneagles	England	(Scotland) Dale Reid (2)	219 (+3)	1 stroke	(England) Jenny Lee Smith
