= Northern Ireland Ladies Open =

Professional golf tournament

Tournament information
- Location: Northern Ireland
- Established: 1979
- Courses: Templepatrick Golf & Country Club
- Par: 72
- Tours: Ladies European Tour; LPGA Tour (1984)
- Format: 54-hole or 72-hole Stroke play
- Prize fund: €200,000
- Final year: 2007

Tournament record score
- Aggregate: 275 Sophie Gustafson (2003)
- To par: −13 as above

Final champion
- (England) Lisa Hall

The Northern Ireland Ladies Open was a professional golf tournament on the Ladies European Tour (LET) held in Northern Ireland.

A Northern Ireland tournament was a fixture on the LET schedule since the tour's inception in 1979. In 1984 the tournament featured on the LPGA Tour along with the Women's British Open. The latest installment, in 2007, took place at Templepatrick Golf and Country Club near Belfast, with a prize fund of €200,000. As well as the LET professionals, the field featured 12-year-old local twins Lisa and Leona Maguire.

== Winners ==
Year	Tour(s)	Venue	County	Winner	Score	To Par	Margin of victory	Runner(s)-up	Note
Northern Ireland Ladies Open
2007	LET	Templepatrick	Antrim	(England) Lisa Hall	214	–2	Playoff	(France) Gwladys Nocera	
2004–2006: No tournament
BT Ladies Open in association with Northern Ireland Events Co.
2003	LET	Warrenpoint	Down	(Sweden) Sophie Gustafson	275	−13	1 stroke	(England) Alison Nicholas	
1987–2002: No tournament
British Midland Ladies' Irish Open
1986	LET	City of Derry	Londonderry	(Scotland) Muriel Thomson	290	+2	6 strokes	(Sweden) Liselotte Neumann	
1985: No tournament
Smirnoff Ladies Irish Open
1984	LET · LPGA	Clandeboye	Down	(United States) Kathy Whitworth	285	−3	2 strokes	(United States) Pat Bradley (United States) Becky Pearson	
1983	LET	Portstewart	Londonderry	(Scotland) Cathy Panton	224	+2	Playoff	(England) Beverly Lewis (Scotland) Muriel Thomson (United States) Susan Moon	
Smirnoff Ulster Open
1982	LET	Portstewart	Londonderry	(United States) Linda Bowman	225	+3	Playoff	(England) Jenny Lee Smith	
1981	LET	Royal Portrush	Antrim	(United States) Sarah Leveque	228	E	Playoff	(England) Christine Langford	
Viscount Double Glazing Championship
1980	LET	Royal Portrush	Antrim	(Scotland) Muriel Thomson	236	+8	4 strokes	(Scotland) Dale Reid (England) Jenny Lee Smith	
State Express Tournament
1979	LET	Royal Portrush	Antrim	(Scotland) Cathy Panton	166	+14	Playoff	(England) Amanda Middleton	

== See also ==
- Ladies Irish Open
- Northern Ireland Open
