= Ulster Volkswagen Classic =

Ulster Classic
Tournament information
- Location: Belfast, Northern Ireland
- Established: 1984
- Course: Belvoir Park GC
- Tour: Ladies European Tour
- Format: 72-hole Stroke play
- Month played: May
- Final year: 1987

Tournament record score
- Aggregate: 283 Dale Reid
- To par: −9 as above

Final champion
- (Scotland) Dale Reid

The Ulster Volkswagen Classic was a women's professional golf tournament on the Ladies European Tour held in Northern Ireland. It was played annually between 1983 and 1987, initially as a pro-am at Clandeboye Golf Club and thereafter at Belvoir Park Golf Club in Belfast.

== Winners ==
Year	Winner	Score	Margin of victory	Runner(s)-up	Winner's share (£)	Venue
Ulster Volkswagen Open
1987	(Scotland) Dale Reid	283 (−9)	8 strokes	(England) Beverley New (South Africa) Sonja Van Wyk	4,500	Belvoir Park
Ulster Volkswagen Classic
1986	(England) Beverly Huke	213 (−6)	1 stroke	(United States) Peggy Conley	3,000	Belvoir Park
1985	(Scotland) Dale Reid	213 (−6)	1 stroke	(United States) Peggy Conley (England) Beverly Huke	2,000	Belvoir Park
1984	(United States) Peggy Conley	216 (−3)	2 strokes	(Scotland) Dale Reid (England) Mickey Walker	890	Belvoir Park
Clandeboye Pro-Am Classic
1983	(England) Christine Sharp	154 (+6)	Playoff	(Scotland) Muriel Thomson	600	Clandeboye
