= 1984 Ladies European Tour =

Professional women's golf tour

1984 Ladies European Tour season
- Duration: May 1984 – October 1984
- Number of official events: 21
- Order of Merit: (Scotland) Dale Reid

The 1984 Ladies European Tour was the fifth season of golf tournaments administered by the Professional Golfers' Association (PGA) on behalf of the Women's Professional Golfers' Association (WPGA), which later became the Ladies European Tour (LET).

In the second season of PGA administration, the tour saw the addition of several new tournaments with the format of most being changed to 72-holes stroke play, having been mostly 54 and 36-hole events previously. In total, there were 21 tournaments on the schedule, including the return of the Women's British Open, organised by the Ladies' Golf Union and one of two tournaments co-sanctioned by the LPGA Tour, along with the Ladies Irish Open.

The Order of Merit was won by Dale Reid, who dominated the season with two tournament victories and five runner-up finishes. In second place was Kitrina Douglas, who won twice during her debut season.

== Tournaments ==
The table below shows the 1984 schedule. The numbers in brackets after the winners' names show the number of career wins they had on the Ladies European Tour up to and including that event. This is only shown for members of the tour.

Date	Tournament	Location	Winner	Score	Margin of victory	Runner(s)–up	Winner's share (£)	Note
5 May	Ford Ladies Classic	England	(England) Kitrina Douglas (1)	292 (−8)	4 strokes	(United States) Peggy Conley	3,000	
17 May	Ulster Volkswagen Classic	Northern Ireland	(United States) Peggy Conley (1)	216 (−3)	2 strokes	(Scotland) Dale Reid (England) Mickey Walker	890	
3 Jun	McEwan's Lager Manchester Classic	England	(United States) Rica Comstock (1)	286	1 stroke	(England) Debbie Dowling	1,500	
8 Jun	British Olivetti Tournament	England	(England) Jenny Lee Smith (10)	294 (+6)	1 stroke	(South Africa) Rae Hast	1,500	
16 Jun	United Friendly Worthing Open	England	(South Africa) Rae Hast (1)	283 (−9)	3 strokes	(United States) Meredith Marshall	1,500	
23 Jun	UBM Northern Classic	England	(Scotland) Dale Reid (8)	291 (+7)	Playoff	(England) Kitrina Douglas	1,500	
1 Jul	Guernsey Open	Guernsey	(Scotland) Muriel Thomson (5)	280 (−8)	3 strokes	(South Africa) Rae Hast	1,500	
5 Jul	Baume & Mercier International	England	(England) Mickey Walker (5)	138 (−8)	3 strokes	(United States) Brenda Lunsford	600	
14 Jul	Wirral Caldy Classic	England	(United States) Lori Castillo (1)	215 (−7)	2 strokes	(United States) Nancy Hoins (England) Alison Nicholas	890	
28 Jul	JS Bloor Eastleigh Classic	England	(Scotland) Dale Reid (9)	254 (−10)	8 strokes	(England) Debbie Dowling	1,500	New tournament
5 Aug	United Friendly Tournament	England	(Sweden) Kärstin Ehrnlund (2)	288 (−8)	4 strokes	(England) Jane Forrest (Scotland) Dale Reid	1,800	
10 Aug	White Horse Whisky Challenge	England	(Italy) Federica Dassù (1)	283 (−5)	1 stroke	(England) Kitrina Douglas (England) Debbie Dowling (Scotland) Dale Reid	1,500	
17 Aug	Colt Cars Jersey Open	Jersey	(Scotland) Jane Connachan (1)	279 (−5)	4 strokes	(England) Kitrina Douglas	1,500	
26 Aug	Höganäs Sweden Open	Sweden	(England) Kitrina Douglas (2)	288 (+4)	3 strokes	(Sweden) Liselotte Neumann (a)	2,925	
2 Sep	IBM Ladies' European Open	England	(Scotland) Gillian Stewart (a)	299 (+7)	Playoff	(England) Penny Grice (a)	3,750 (Note: As amateurs, neither Stewart nor Grice were eligible for the prize money; the £3,750 for first place went to Kitrina Douglas, who finished in third place.)	New tournament
7 Sep	LBS Ladies' German Open	Germany	(England) Beverly Huke (5)	219 (E)	3 strokes	(England) Kitrina Douglas	1,800	New tournament
14 Sep	Lorne Stewart Matchplay Championship	England	(England) Mickey Walker (6)	2 and 1		(Scotland) Jane Connachan	2,000	Match play event
27 Sep	Sands International	England	(Scotland) Muriel Thomson (6)	307 (+11)	1 stroke	(Scotland) Jane Connachan	1,500	
6 Oct	**Hitachi Ladies British Open**	England	(Japan) Ayako Okamoto (n/a)	289 (−3)	11 strokes	(United States) Betsy King (Scotland) Dale Reid	25,000	Co-sanctioned by the LPGA Tour
14 Oct	Smirnoff Ladies Irish Open	Northern Ireland	(United States) Kathy Whitworth (n/a)	285 (−3)	2 strokes	(United States) Pat Bradley (United States) Becky Pearson	18,000	Co-sanctioned by the LPGA Tour
26 Oct	La Manga Spanish Open	Spain	(England) Maxine Burton (2)	286 (−10)	1 stroke	(Scotland) Dale Reid	1,800	

Major championships in bold.

== Order of Merit ==
The Order of Merit was sponsored by Ring and Brymer and based on prize money won throughout the season.

Place	Player	Money (£)	Events
1	(Scotland) Dale Reid	28,239	
2	(England) Kitrina Douglas	19,899	
3	(United States) Peggy Conley	12,171	
4			
5			
6			
7			
8	(Scotland) Jane Connachan	8,956	
9	(Scotland) Muriel Thomson	8,519	
10			

== See also ==
- 1984 LPGA Tour
