= Greater Manchester Tournament =

Tournament information
- Location: Greater Manchester, England
- Established: 1980
- Course: Haigh Halls Golf Club
- Tour: Ladies European Tour
- Format: Stroke play
- Prize fund: £20,000
- Month played: September
- Final year: 1986

Tournament record score
- Aggregate: 268 Laura Davies
- To par: −20 as above

Final champion
- (England) Laura Davies

Location map
- Location in England Location in Greater Manchester

The Greater Manchester Tournament was a women's professional golf tournament on the Ladies European Tour. It was played between 1980 and 1986 in the Greater Manchester area, England.

== Winners ==
Year	Winner	Score	Margin of victory	Runner(s)-up	Winner's share (£)	Venue	Ref
Greater Manchester Tournament
1986	(England) Laura Davies	268 (−20)	3 strokes	(England) Penny Grice-Whittaker	3,000	Haigh Halls Golf Club	
1985	No tournament						
McEwan's Lager Manchester Classic
1984	(United States) Rica Comstock	286 (+2)	1 stroke	(England) Debbie Dowling	1,500	Heaton Park Golf Club	
Dunham Forest Pro-Am
1983	(Scotland) Cathy Panton	142 (−2)	2 strokes	(England) Mickey Walker	600	Dunham Forest Golf Club	
Moben Kitchens Classic
1982	(Scotland) Cathy Panton	216 (−3)	1 stroke	(England) Jenny Lee Smith	1,000	The Mere Resort & Spa	
1981	(Scotland) Dale Reid	213 (−6)	6 strokes	(England) Jenny Lee Smith	900	The Mere Resort & Spa	
Manchester Evening News Pro-Am Classic
1980	(England) Jenny Lee Smith	220 (+1)	3 strokes	(Wales) Pam Chugg (England) Vanessa Marvin	600	The Mere Resort & Spa	
