= United Friendly Tournament =

Tournament information
- Location: England
- Established: 1981
- Tour(s): Ladies European Tour
- Format: Stroke play
- Final year: 1984

Final champion
- (Sweden) Kärstin Ehrnlund

The United Friendly Tournament was a women's professional golf tournament on the Ladies European Tour. It was played annually between 1981 and 1984 at various courses in England.

A concurrent tournament, the United Friendly Worthing Open, held 1982–1984 at Hill Barn Golf Club in Worthing, West Sussex, had the same title sponsor.

== Winners ==
Year	Venue	Winner	Score	Margin of victory	Runner-up	Winner's share (£)
United Friendly Tournament
1984	Southport & Ainsdale GC	(Sweden) Kärstin Ehrnlund	288 (−8)	4 strokes	(England) Jane Forrest (Scotland) Dale Reid	1,800
1983	Moortown GC	(Scotland) Dale Reid	216 (−6)	2 strokes	(England) Maxine Burton	1,000
United Friendly Insurance Championship
1982	Walmley GC	(England) Beverley New (a)	212 (−1)	2 strokes	(England) Jenny Lee Smith	
1981	Moretonhampstead GC	(United States) Sarah LeVeque	220	8 strokes	(Australia) Sherrin Galbraith (Scotland) Cathy Panton	

== See also ==
- United Friendly Worthing Open
