= Hitachi WPGA Championship =

Tournament information
- Location: England
- Established: 1979
- Course(s): Walsall GC
- Tour(s): Ladies European Tour
- Format: 54-hole stroke play
- Final year: 1980

Final champion
- (United States) Susan Moon

The Hitachi WPGA Championship was a women's professional golf tournament on the Ladies European Tour. It was played 1979 and 1980 in England.

The 1981 tournament was cancelled after sponsors withdrew their support.

== Winners ==
Year	Venue	Winner	Score	Margin of victory	Runner-up	Winner's share (£)	Ref
1981	Cancelled						
1980	Walsall	(United States) Susan Moon	222 (E)	4 strokes	(England) Maxine Burton (England) Mickey Walker	600	
1979	Downshire	(England) Christine Trew	145 (−1)	3 strokes	(South Africa) Alison Sheard	400	
