= United Friendly Worthing Open =

Tournament information
- Location: Worthing, West Sussex, England
- Established: 1982
- Course: Hill Barn GC
- Tour: Ladies European Tour
- Format: Stroke play
- Final year: 1984

Final champion
- (South Africa) Rae Hast

The United Friendly Worthing Open was a women's professional golf tournament on the Ladies European Tour held in England. It was played annually between 1982 and 1984 at Hill Barn Golf Club in Worthing, West Sussex.

== Winners ==
Year	Winner	Score	Margin of victory	Runner-up	Winner's share (£)	Ref
1984	(South Africa) Rae Hast	283 (−9)	3 strokes	(United States) Meredith Marshall	1,500	
1983	(Spain) Marta Figueras-Dotti	217 (+4)	5 strokes	(England) Beverly Huke	750	
1982	(United States) Rosie Jones	217 (−2)	6 strokes	(England) Mickey Walker	325	

== See also ==
- United Friendly Tournament
