= 1979 Ladies European Tour =

Golf tournament series

1979 Ladies European Tour season
- Duration: April 1979 – October 1979
- Number of official events: 18
- Order of Merit: (Scotland) Cathy Panton

The 1979 Ladies European Tour was the inaugural season of golf tournaments organised by the Women's Professional Golfers' Association (WPGA), which later became the Ladies European Tour (LET). The tour was principally sponsored by Carlsberg, who organised 12 36-hole tournaments counting towards their own Order of Merit. There were six other tournaments on the schedule including the Women's British Open, organised by the Ladies' Golf Union.

The Order of Merit was won by Cathy Panton, who finished just 1.5 points ahead of Women's British Open winner, Alison Sheard. Sheard topped the money list with almost £5,000 in winnings, over £1,000 more than runner-up Jane Panter. The Carlsberg Order of Merit was won by Christine Langford, who won three of the twelve events and finished as runner-up in two others.

== Tournaments ==
The table below shows the 1979 schedule. The numbers in brackets after the winners' names show the number of career wins they had on the Ladies European Tour up to and including that event. This is only shown for members of the tour.

Date	Tournament	Location	Winner	Score	Margin of victory	Runner(s)–up	Winner's share (£)	Ref
27 Apr	Carlsberg Championship – Tyrrells Wood	England	(United States) Mollie Anderson (1)	145 (+1)	3 strokes	(England) Jane Chapman	200	
4 May	Carlsberg Championship – Willingdon	England	(Scotland) Cathy Panton (1)	151 (+5)	1 stroke	(Sweden) Kärstin Ehrnlund (England) Christine Langford	200	
11 May	Carlsberg Championship – Long Ashton	England	(England) Christine Langford (1)	73 (−2) (Note: Second round abandoned because of fog; tournament results based on first round scores.)	2 strokes	(Sweden) Kärstin Ehrnlund (England) Vanessa Marvin	200	
18 May	Carlsberg Championship – Baberton	Scotland	(England) Joanna Smurthwaite (1)	147 (+1)	2 strokes	(England) Jane Panter	200	
25 May	Carlsberg Championship – Whitecraigs	Scotland	(England) Christine Langford (2)	142 (−4)	4 strokes	(South Africa) Alison Sheard	200	
1 Jun	Carlsberg Championship – Coventry	England	(England) Jane Panter (1)	146 (−2)	1 stroke	(Scotland) Cathy Panton	200	
8 Jun	Carlsberg Championship – South Staffs	England	(England) Vanessa Marvin (1)	143 (−3)	5 strokes	(Sweden) Kärstin Ehrnlund	200	
15 Jun	Carlsberg Championship – Ballater	Scotland	(England) Beverly Huke (1)	146 (−2)	1 stroke	(England) Jane Panter (Scotland) Muriel Thomson (England) Mickey Walker	200	
22 Jun	Carlsberg Championship – St Annes Old Links	England	(England) Christine Langford (3)	148 (+2)	Playoff	(England) Jenny Lee Smith	200	
29 Jun	Carlsberg Championship – York	England	(England) Mickey Walker (1)	140 (−2)	1 stroke	(South Africa) Alison Sheard	200	
6 Jul	Carlsberg Championship – Sand Moor	England	(South Africa) Alison Sheard (1)	147 (+1)	3 strokes	(England) Christine Langford (Scotland) Cathy Panton	200	
13 Jul	Carlsberg Championship – Arcot Hall	England	(England) Jenny Lee Smith (1)	140 (−2)	3 strokes	(Scotland) Muriel Thomson	200	
28 Jul	**Women's British Open**	England	(South Africa) Alison Sheard (2)	301 (+5)	3 strokes	(England) Mickey Walker	3,000	
31 Aug	McEwan's Welsh Classic	Wales	(South Africa) Alison Sheard (3)	144 (+4)	1 stroke	(England) Christine Trew	400	
14 Sep	Hitachi Tournament	England	(England) Christine Trew (1)	145 (−1)	3 strokes	(South Africa) Alison Sheard	400	
22 Sep	State Express Tournament	Northern Ireland	(Scotland) Cathy Panton (2)	166 (+14)	Playoff	(England) Amanda Middleton	800	
29 Sep	WPGA European Championship	France	(United States) Susan Moon (1)	292	2 strokes	(West Germany) Irene Koehler		
27 Oct	Lambert & Butler Matchplay	England	(England) Jane Panter (2)	2 up		(Scotland) Muriel Thomson	2,000	

Major championship in bold.

== Order of Merit and money list ==
The Order of Merit was based on a points system.

Place	Player	Points	Money (£)	Events
1	(Scotland) Cathy Panton	846	2,495	18
2	(South Africa) Alison Sheard	844.5	4,965	13
3	(England) Christine Langford	789.5	1,533	15
4	(England) Jane Panter	770	3,830	18
5	(England) Vanessa Marvin	740	2,434	18
6	(Scotland) Muriel Thomson	641	3,043	15
7	(England) Christine Trew	624	1,955	15
8	(England) Jenny Lee Smith	597.5	3,222	10
9	(England) Jane Chapman	578.5	1,479	15
10	(England) Amanda Middleton	574.5	1,861	17

== See also ==
- 1979 LPGA Tour
