= NatWest East Anglian Open =

Golf tournament

East Anglian Open
Tournament information
- Location: Bury St Edmunds, Suffolk, England
- Established: 1982
- Courses: Lark Valley Golf & Country Club
- Tour: Ladies European Tour
- Format: Stroke play
- Prize fund: £3,000
- Final year: 1983

Final champion
- (England) Beverly Huke (England) Judy Statham

Location map
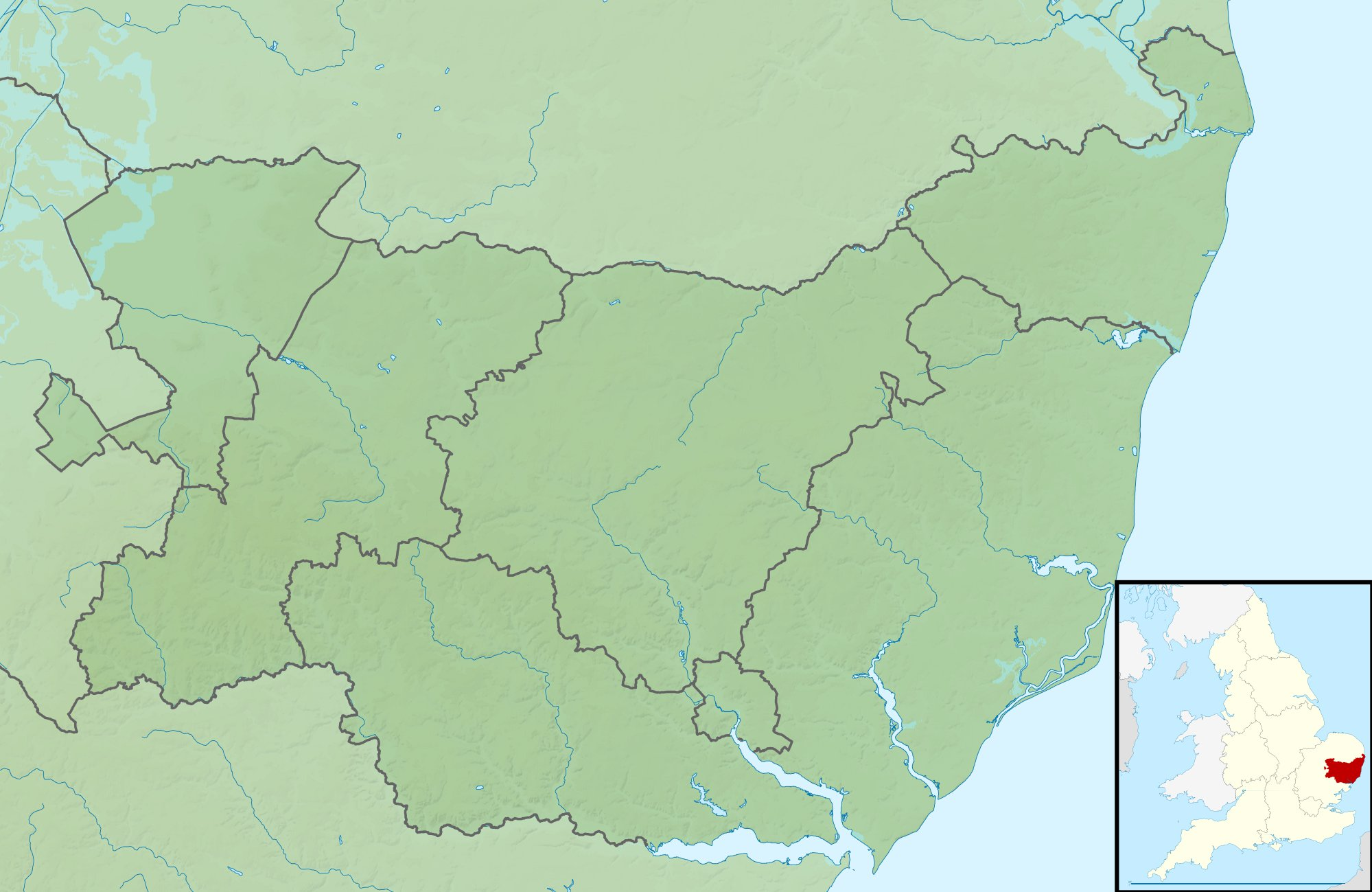
- Location in England Location in Suffolk

The East Anglian Open was a women's professional golf tournament on the Ladies European Tour held in England. It was held in Bury St Edmunds, Suffolk, East Anglia.

== Venue ==
The tournament was always held at the Lark Valley Golf & Country Club in Fornham St Genevieve, originally built and run by a local farmer in the 1970s. It was briefly owned by a Japanese business before taken over by former newspaper magnate Eddie Shah. It later became The Suffolk Golf Club.

== Winners ==
Year	Winner	Score	Margin of victory	Runner-up	Winner's share (£)	Ref
Playford Lark Valley Classic
1983	(England) Beverly Huke (England) Judy Statham	138 (−4)	Tie	—N/a	350 (each)	
NatWest East Anglian Open
1982	(United States) Linda Bowman	215 (−1)	1 stroke	(Scotland) Muriel Thomson	700	
