= Dale Reid =

Scottish professional golfer (1959–2023)

Dale Reid OBE
Personal information
- Nationality: Scotland
- Born: 20 March 1959 Ladybank, Scotland
- Died: 8 November 2023 (aged 64) Townsville, Queensland, Australia
- Height: 1.62 m (5 ft 4 in)
- Life partner: Corinne Dibnah

Career
- Sport: Golf
- Turned professional: 1979
- Former tours: Ladies European Tour (1979–2005); LPGA Tour (1997–1998)
- Professional wins: 24

Number of wins by tour
- Ladies European Tour: 21 (2nd all-time)
- Other: 3

Best results in LPGA major championships
- Chevron Championship: CUT: 1985, 1992
- Women's PGA C'ship: T25: 1997
- U.S. Women's Open: 64th: 1988
- du Maurier Classic: T52: 1997
- Women's British Open: CUT: 2001, 2002, 2004

Achievements and awards
- Ladies European Tour Order of Merit: 1984, 1987

Dale Reid OBE (20 March 1959 – 8 November 2023) was a Scottish professional golfer. She was one of the most successful players in the history of the Ladies European Tour, with 21 tournament victories. She topped the Order of Merit in 1984 and 1987 and was made a life member of the tour after collecting her 20th title at the 1991 Ford Classic. She played for Europe in the first four Solheim Cups (1990, 1992, 1994, and 1996) and was Europe's non-playing captain in 2000 and 2002.

== Early life and amateur career ==
In 1959, Reid was born in Ladybank, Scotland. At the age of 15, Reid reached the final of the Scottish Girls Championship where she lost 3&1 to Suzanne Cadden. She also made her first appearance in the Girls Home Internationals. She also played in the Girl's Home Internationals in 1975, 1976 and 1977.

She also played in the Women's Home Internationals in 1978 and 1979. In 1978, she reached the final of the French International Lady Juniors Amateur Championship, losing 4&3 to Marie-Laure de Lorenzi.

== Professional career ==
In 1979, Reid turned professional. She played predominantly on the Ladies European Tour, where she won 21 times between 1980 and 1991, and played in over 370 tournaments. She won the tour's Order of Merit twice, 1984 and 1987.

In 1996, Reid qualified for the LPGA Tour. She played on the tour in 1997 and in early 1998. Her best finish was tied for 4th place in the 1997 Safeco Classic.

== Personal life ==
In 2010 in Gladstone, Queensland, a truck she was riding in crashed into a car. She survived with minor cuts and bruises, but the driver of the car and a passenger, an eight-year-old boy, were killed.

Reid died from cancer in Townsville, Queensland on 8 November 2023, at the age of 64.

== Awards and honors ==
- In 1984 and 1987, she led the Ladies European Tour Order of Merit.
- Reid was appointed an Officer of the Order of the British Empire (OBE) in the 2001 New Year Honours for services to women's golf, following the 2000 Solheim Cup win.

== Professional wins (24) ==
=== Ladies European Tour wins (21) ===
No.	Date	Tournament	Winning score	Margin of victory	Runner(s)-up	Ref.
1	4 Jul 1980	Carlsberg Championship – Finham Park	−9 (73-66=138)	7 strokes	(Scotland) Cathy Panton, (England) Joanne Smurthwaite	
2	14 Aug 1981	Carlsberg Championship – Gleneagles	+3 (72-71-76=219)	1 stroke	(England) Jenny Lee Smith	
3	14 Sep 1981	Moben Kitchens Classic	−6 (69-71-73=213)	6 strokes	(England) Jenny Lee Smith	
4	30 Jun 1982	Guernsey Open	+3 (76-72-71=219)	3 strokes	(United States) Linda Bowman	
5	29 Jul 1983	United Friendly Tournament	−6 (69-73-74=216)	2 strokes	(England) Maxine Burton	
6	24 Aug 1983	Lilley Brook Cotswold Ladies Classic	−9 (69-70=139)	2 strokes	(Sweden) Kärstin Ehrnlund, (Zimbabwe) Elizabeth Glass	
7	9 Oct 1983	Caldy Classic	+3 (78-69-78=225)	1 stroke	(England) Maxine Burton, (England) Jo Rumsey	
8	23 Jun 1984	UBM Northern Classic	+7 (73-76-71-71=291)	Playoff	(England) Kitrina Douglas	
9	28 Jul 1984	JS Bloor Eastleigh Classic	−10 (61-64-63-66=254)	8 strokes	(England) Debbie Dowling	
10	19 May 1985	Ulster Volkswagen Classic	−6 (70-72-71=213)	3 strokes	(United States) Peggy Conley, (England) Beverly Huke	
11	28 Sep 1985	Brend Hotels International	−8 (73-68-72-75=288)	2 strokes	(Scotland) Muriel Thomson	
12	24 May 1986	British Olivetti Tournament	−7 (73-71-70-71=285)	Playoff	(England) Laura Davies	
13	31 May 1987	Ulster Volkswagen Open	−9 (73-72-68-70=283)	8 strokes	(England) Beverley New, (South Africa) Sonja Van Wyk	
14	21 Jun 1987	Volmac Dutch Open	−5 (71-67-73-72=283)	3 strokes	(Northern Ireland) Maureen Garner	
15	12 Jul 1987	La Manga Club Ladies European Open	−20 (66-71-67-68=272)	4 strokes	(Australia) Corinne Dibnah	
16	6 Sep 1987	Bowring Ladies Scottish Open	−3 (69-73-71-72=285)	Playoff	(England) Laura Davies	
17	3 Jul 1988	Birchgrey European Open	−9 (68-72-71-72=283)	1 stroke	(England) Alison Nicholas	
18	25 Sep 1988	Toshiba Players Championship	+2 (70-76-75-73=294)	Playoff	(United States) Peggy Conley	
19	26 Aug 1990	Haninge Ladies Open	−1 (74-71-72-74=291)	1 stroke	(Northern Ireland) Maureen Garner, (England) Alison Nicholas, (England) Suzanne Strudwick	
20	5 May 1991	Ford Ladies' Classic	−16 (68-70-71-71=280)	1 stroke	(England) Alison Nicholas	
21	14 Jul 1991	Bloor Homes Eastleigh Classic	−11 (63-64-64-58=249)	8 strokes	(England) Diane Barnard	

=== Other wins (3) ===
- 1990 Sunningdale Foursomes (with Corinne Dibnah), Women's Victorian Open
- 1993 Rörstrand Ladies Open (Sweden)

== Team appearances ==
Amateur

- Girls Home Internationals (representing Scotland): 1974, 1975, 1976 (winners), 1977
- Women's Home Internationals (representing Scotland): 1978, 1979 (winners)

Professional

- Solheim Cup (representing Europe): 1990, 1992 (winners), 1994, 1996, 2000 (non-playing captain, winners), 2002 (non-playing captain)

== See also ==
- List of golfers with most Ladies European Tour wins
