= Elizabeth Ann Classic =

Golf tournament on Ladies European Tour

Tournament information
- Location: Leeds, Yorkshire, England
- Established: 1980
- Course: Woodhall Hills Golf Club
- Tour: Ladies European Tour
- Format: Stroke play
- Prize fund: £4,000
- Final year: 1983

Tournament record score
- Aggregate: 289 Cathy Panton
- To par: −11 As above

Final champion
- (England) Debbie Dowling

Location map
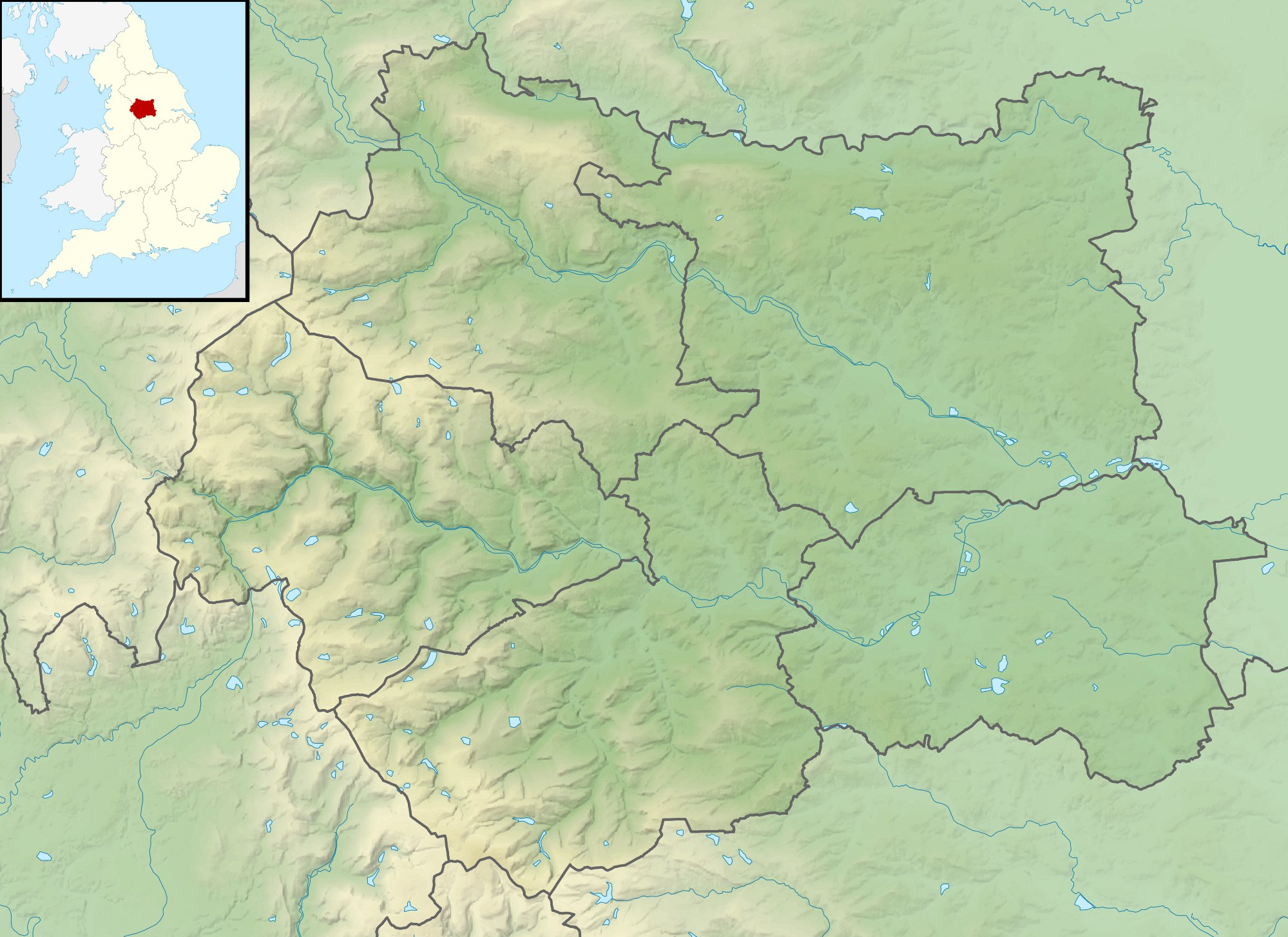
- Location in England Location in West Yorkshire

The Elizabeth Ann Classic was a women's professional golf tournament on the Ladies European Tour held near Leeds in England.

== History ==
The Elizabeth Ann Classic was played in 1980 and 1981 at Pannal Golf Club, in Pannal near Harrogate, 13 miles (21 km) north of Leeds.

In 1983, the Melcade International Tournament was held at Woodhall Hills Golf Club, 7 miles (11 km) west of Leeds

== Winners ==
Year	Winner	Score	Margin of victory	Runner-up	Purse (£)	Venue	Ref
Melcade International Tournament
1983	(England) Debbie Dowling	E (70-72=142)	1 stroke	(England) Joanna Smurthwaite	4,000	Woodhall Hills	
1982	No tournament						
Elizabeth Ann Classic
1981	(Scotland) Muriel Thomson	+1 (77-68-76-72=293)	1 stroke	(England) Jenny Lee Smith	10,000	Pannal	
1980	(Scotland) Cathy Panton	−11 (73-74-69-73=289)	5 strokes	(England) Jenny Lee Smith	10,000	Pannal	
