= 1985 Ladies European Tour =

Professional women's golf tour

1985 Ladies European Tour season
- Duration: May 1985 – October 1985
- Number of official events: 20
- Order of Merit: (England) Laura Davies

The 1985 Ladies European Tour was a series of golf tournaments for elite female golfers from around the world which took place in 1985. The tournaments were sanctioned by the Ladies European Tour (LET).

== Tournaments ==
The table below shows the 1985 schedule. The numbers in brackets after the winners' names show the number of career wins they had on the Ladies European Tour up to and including that event. This is only shown for members of the tour.

Date	Tournament	Location	Winner	Score	Margin of victory	Runner(s)–up	Winner's share (£)	Note
4 May	Ford Ladies Classic	England	(Scotland) Gillian Stewart (1)	296 (−4)	Playoff	(Scotland) Muriel Thomson	2,500	
11 May	Hennessy Cognac Ladies Cup	France	(Australia) Jan Stephenson (1)	283 (−13)	5 strokes	(England) Laura Davies	5,000	New tournament
19 May	Ulster Volkswagen Classic	N. Ireland	(Scotland) Dale Reid (10)	213 (−6)	3 strokes	(United States) Peggy Conley (England) Beverly Huke	2,000	
26 May	British Olivetti Tournament	England	(Scotland) Jane Connachan (2)	284 (−8)	1 stroke	(Scotland) Dale Reid	2,000	
7 Jun	Vale do Lobo Portuguese Ladies Open	Portugal	(England) Debbie Dowling (3)	285	4 strokes	(England) Kitrina Douglas	2,500	
15 Jun	McEwan's Wirral Caldy Classic	England	(Scotland) Cathy Panton (10)	291 (−5)	3 strokes	(England) Laura Davies (England) Penny Grice	2,000	
22 Jun	Bowring Birmingham Ladies Classic	England	(Italy) Federica Dassù (2)	280 (−4)	2 strokes	(England) Debbie Dowling	2,500	
30 Jun	Belgian Ladies Open	Belgium	(England) Laura Davies (1)	286 (−6)	1 stroke	(England) Maxine Burton	5,000	New tournament
14 Jul	LBS Ladies' German Open	Germany	(Scotland) Julie Brown (1)	288 (−4)	Playoff	(Germany) Barbara Helbig	4,000	
27 Jul	JS Bloor Eastleigh Classic	England	(England) Christine Sharp (2)	261 (−3)	1 stroke	(England) Kitrina Douglas	2,000	
1 Aug	Mitsubishi Colt Cars Jersey Open	Jersey	(Sweden) Marie Wennersten (1)	211 (−2)	2 strokes	(England) Kitrina Douglas	2,000	
10 Aug	Trusthouse Forte Ladies' Classic	Spain	(England) Beverly Huke (6)	289 (−3)	1 stroke	(Australia) Corinne Dibnah	5,000	New tournament
17 Aug	Delsjö Ladies Open	Sweden	(Scotland) Cathy Panton (11)	210 (−3)	1 stroke	(United States) Kelly Leadbetter (Sweden) Marie Wennersten	3,000	
25 Aug	Höganäs Sweden Open	Sweden	(Sweden) Liselotte Neumann (1)	283 (−1)	1 stroke	(England) Laura Davies	4,500	
7 Sep	IBM Ladies' European Open	England	(Sweden) Liselotte Neumann (2)	272 (−20)	2 strokes	(England) Susan Moorcraft (a) (Scotland) Cathy Panton	7,500	
22 Sep	415/Vantage WPGA Matchplay Championship	England	(Scotland) Jane Connachan (3)	1 up		(England) Debbie Dowling	2,000	Match play event
28 Sep	Brend Hotels International	England	(Scotland) Dale Reid (11)	288 (−8)	2 strokes	(Scotland) Muriel Thomson	2,000	
5 Oct	**Burberry Women's British Open**	England	(United States) Betsy King (1)	300 (+8)	2 strokes	(Spain) Marta Figueras-Dotti	9,000	
12 Oct	Laing Ladies Classic	England	(Scotland) Muriel Thomson (7)	282 (−10)	1 stroke	(England) Beverly Huke (England) Vanessa Marvin	2,500	New tournament
18 Oct	La Manga Spanish Open	Spain	(South Africa) Alison Sheard (4)	285 (−11)	2 strokes	(Spain) Marta Figueras-Dotti	2,500	

Major championships in bold.

== Order of Merit rankings ==
Rank	Player	Country	Money (£)
1	Laura Davies	England	21,736
2	Jane Connachan	Scotland	21,234
3	Beverly Huke	England	18,702
4	Muriel Thomson	Scotland	18,631
5	Debbie Dowling	England	18,097
6	Dale Reid	Scotland	16,223
7	Kitrina Douglas	England	15,665
8	Gillian Stewart	Scotland	15,526
9	Cathy Panton	Scotland	15,092
10	Marie Wennersten	Sweden	14,921

== See also ==
- 1985 LPGA Tour
