= Lilley Brook Cotswold Ladies Classic =

Golf tournament

Lilley Brook Ladies Classic
Tournament information
- Location: Cheltenham, Gloucestershire, England
- Established: 1983
- Course: Lilley Brook Golf Club
- Par: 73
- Tour: Ladies European Tour
- Format: Stroke play
- Prize fund: £5,000
- Month played: July
- Final year: 1984

Final champion
- (England) Mickey Walker

Location map
- Location in England Location in Gloucestershire

The Lilley Brook Cotswold Ladies Classic was a women's professional golf tournament on the Ladies European Tour (LET) held in Cheltenham, England. It was only played in 1983 and 1984.

== History ==
The tournament was held at Lilley Brook Golf Club, on the edge of the Cotswolds. Dale Reid won her 6th LET title at the event in 1983, and Mickey Walker her 5th in 1984. The final installment was sponsored by Baume et Mercier, a Swiss watchmaker.

== Winners ==
Year	Winner	Score	Margin of victory	Runner-up	Winner's share (£)	Ref
Baume & Mercier International Golf Classic
1984	(England) Mickey Walker	138 (−8)	3 strokes	(United States) Brenda Lunsford	600	
Lilley Brook Cotswold Ladies Classic
1983	(Scotland) Dale Reid	139 (−9)	2 strokes	(Sweden) Kärstin Ehrnlund (Zimbabwe) Elizabeth Glass	600	
