= Volvo International Tournament =

Volvo Ladies Invitational
Tournament information
- Location: Gothenburg, Sweden
- Established: 1980
- Course(s): Albatross GK
- Par: 72
- Tour(s): Ladies European Tour
- Format: 54-hole stroke play
- Month played: June
- Final year: 1981

Final champion
- (England) Beverly Lewis Location in Europe

The Volvo Ladies Invitational was a women's professional golf tournament on the Ladies European Tour held in Sweden. It was played in 1980 and 1981 at Albatross Golf Club near Gothenburg.

The tournament was the first LET event held in Sweden and only the second LET event outside the United Kingdom, after the WPGA European Championship held in France.

== Format ==
The event was a limited field invitational with a field consisting of the top 24 players from the LET Order of Merit.

The tournament was played over three rounds with the score based on the best of the two first rounds along with the final round.

== Winners ==
Year	Winner	Score	Margin of victory	Runner-up	Ref
1981	(England) Beverly Lewis	+5 (76-71=147)	3 strokes	(Sweden) Kärstin Ehrnlund	
1980	(England) Jenny Lee Smith	+7 (73-76=149)	2 strokes	(England) Mickey Walker	
