= Christine Langford =

English professional golfer (born 1957)

Personal information
- Nationality: England
- Born: 1957 (age 68–69) Stafford, England
- Height: 167 cm (5 ft 6 in)

Career
- Sport: Golf
- Turned professional: 1977
- Former tours: LPGA Tour; Ladies European Tour
- Professional wins: 5

Number of wins by tour
- Ladies European Tour: 4
- Other: 1

Achievements and awards
- Carlsberg Order of Merit winner: 1979

Christine Langford (born 1957) is an English professional golfer. She was a founding member of the Women's Professional Golfers' Association (WPGA) and won four tournaments on the Ladies European Tour (LET) between 1979 and 1980.

== Career ==
Langford played on the LPGA Tour in the United States and returned to England in 1979 to play in the first LET event, the Carlsberg European Ladies' Championship at Tyrrells Wood.

She topped the 1979 Carlsberg Order of Merit after she won three of the twelve events and finished as runner-up in two others.

After retiring from tour, Langford became a teaching pro. In 1988, she became the first woman professional to be appointed as a head pro at a committee-run members club in the UK when she joined Clevedon Golf Club in Somerset. In 2015, she joined Thorpeness Golf Club in Suffolk. She was the Welsh National coach for seven years.

== Professional wins (5) ==
=== Ladies European Tour wins (4) ===
| # | Date | Tournament | Score | Margin of victory | Runner(s)-up | Ref |
|---|---|---|---|---|---|---|
| 1 | 11 May 1979 | Carlsberg Championship – Long Ashton | 73 (−2) (Note: Second round abandoned because of fog; tournament results based on first round scores.) | 2 strokes | (Sweden) Kärstin Ehrnlund (England) Vanessa Marvin | |
| 2 | 25 May 1979 | Carlsberg Championship – Whitecraigs | 142 (−4) | 4 strokes | (South Africa) Alison Sheard | |
| 3 | 22 Jun 1979 | Carlsberg Championship – St Annes Old Links | 148 (+2) | Playoff | (England) Jenny Lee Smith | |
| 4 | 13 Jun 1980 | Carlsberg Championship – Knowle | 142 (−6) | 1 stroke | (England) Sue Bamford | |

Ladies European Tour playoff record (1–1)

| No. | Year | Tournament | Opponent | Result | Ref |
|---|---|---|---|---|---|
| 1 | 1979 | Carlsberg Championship – St Annes Old Links | (England) Jenny Lee Smith | Won with par on first extra hole | |
| 2 | 1981 | Smirnoff Ulster Open | (United States) Sarah LeVeque | Lost to par on first extra hole | |

=== Other wins (1) ===
- 1982 Sunningdale Foursomes (with Mickey Walker)
