= McEwan's Lager Welsh Classic =

Tournament information
- Location: Cardiff, Wales
- Established: 1979
- Tour(s): Ladies European Tour
- Format: Stroke play
- Final year: 1981

Final champion
- (England) Jenny Lee Smith

The McEwan's Lager Welsh Classic was a women's professional golf tournament on the Ladies European Tour held in Wales. It was played at Dinas Powys in 1979 and Whitchurch, Cardiff in 1980 and 1981.

== Winners ==
Year	Venue	Winner	Score	Margin of victory	Runner-up	Winner's share (£)
McEwan's Lager Welsh Classic
1981	Whitchurch GC	(England) Jenny Lee Smith	216 (E)	2 strokes	(Scotland) Muriel Thomson	1,500
1980	Whitchurch GC	(Sweden) Kärstin Ehrnlund	142 (−2)	2 strokes	(England) Jane Chapman	
McEwan's Welsh Classic
1979	Dinas Powis GC	(South Africa) Alison Sheard	144 (+4)	1 stroke	(England) Christine Trew	400

== See also ==
- Women's Welsh Open
