= UBM Classic =

Tournament information
- Location: Newcastle upon Tyne, England
- Established: 1983
- Course: Arcot Hall GC
- Tour: Ladies European Tour
- Format: 72-hole stroke play (1984); 54-hole stroke play (1983)
- Final year: 1984

Tournament record score
- Aggregate: 210 Cathy Panton (1983)
- To par: −3 as above

Final champion
- (Scotland) Dale Reid

The UBM Classic (known in its first edition as the UBM Northern Classic) was a women's professional golf tournament on the Ladies European Tour held in England. It was played 1983 and 1984 at Arcot Hall Golf Club near Newcastle upon Tyne.

Both winners, Cathy Panton and Dale Reid, secured their eighth LET title at the event, respectively.

== Winners ==
Year	Winner	Score	Margin of victory	Runner(s)-up
UBM Classic
1984	(Scotland) Dale Reid	291 (+7)	Playoff	(England) Kitrina Douglas
UBM Northern Classic
1983	(Scotland) Cathy Panton	210 (−3)	5 strokes	(England) Jane Forrest
