= 1988 Ladies European Tour =

Professional women's golf tour

1988 Ladies European Tour season
- Duration: N/A
- Number of official events: 27
- Order of Merit: (France) Marie-Laure de Lorenzi-Taya

The 1988 Ladies European Tour was a series of golf tournaments for elite female golfers from around the world which took place in 1988. The tournaments were sanctioned by the Ladies European Tour (LET).

== Tournaments ==
The table below shows the 1988 schedule. The numbers in brackets after the winners' names show the number of career wins they had on the Ladies European Tour up to and including that event. This is only shown for members of the tour.

Date	Tournament	Location	Winner	Score	Margin of victory	Runner(s)-up	Winner's share (£)	Note
17 Apr	Marbella Ladies Open	Spain	(South Africa) Laurette Maritz (1)	283 (−3)	3 strokes	(Australia) Corinne Dibnah (Scotland) Dale Reid	9,000	
30 Apr	Ford Ladies Classic	England	(England) Laura Davies (7)	292 (−4)	1 stroke	(Australia) Corinne Dibnah	6,000	
7 May	EMS Masters	Portugal	(South Africa) Laurette Maritz (2)	213 (E)	3 strokes	(Spain) Tania Abitbol (Australia) Karen Lunn (England) Alison Nicholas (Sweden) Marie Wennersten-From	7,500	
15 May	Portuguese Ladies Open	Portugal	(United States) Peggy Conley (2)	291	1 stroke	(Australia) Corinne Dibnah	6,000	
21 May	British Olivetti Tournament	England	(England) Alison Nicholas (3)	283 (−9)	1 stroke	(Scotland) Jane Connachan	4,500	
29 May	BMW Ladies' German Open	Germany	(Sweden) Liselotte Neumann (5)	290 (+2)	1 stroke	(France) Marie-Laure de Lorenzi-Taya	9,000	
5 Jun	Broadway Wirral Classic	England	(England) Beverley New	283 (−13)	3 strokes	(Scotland) Cathy Panton	4,500	
12 Jun	Letting French Open	France	(France) Marie-Laure de Lorenzi-Taya (3)	290 (−2)	Playoff	(France) Caroline Bourtayre	10,500	
19 Jun	Volmac Dutch Open	Netherlands	(France) Marie-Laure de Lorenzi-Taya (4)	295	1 stroke	(England) Kitrina Douglas	9,000	
26 Jun	St Moritz Open	Switzerland	(New Zealand) Janice Arnold	285 (−3)	1 stroke	(Scotland) Cathy Panton	9,000	New tournament
3 Jul	Birchgrey European Open	England	(Scotland) Dale Reid (17)	283 (−9)	1 stroke	(England) Alison Nicholas	9,000	
10 Jul	Hennessy Cognac Ladies Cup	France	(France) Marie-Laure de Lorenzi-Taya (5)	284 (−4)	1 stroke	(England) Alison Nicholas	11,250	
23 Jul	Bloor Homes Eastleigh Classic	England	(Australia) Corinne Dibnah (5)	256 (−8)	1 stroke	(Australia) Dennise Hutton (United States) Dana Lofland	6,000	
31 Jul	**Weetabix Women's British Open**	England	(Australia) Corinne Dibnah (6)	295 (1)	Playoff	(South Africa) Sally Little	15,000	
14 Aug	Danish Ladies Open	Denmark	(Belgium) Florence Descampe (1)	285 (−3)	4 strokes	(United States) Peggy Conley (England) Laura Davies (Sweden) Liselotte Neumann	9,000	New tournament
21 Aug	Gothenburg Ladies Open	Sweden	(France) Marie-Laure de Lorenzi-Taya (6)	275 (−9)	3 strokes	(United States) Peggy Conley	9,000	
28 Aug	Bowring Ladies Scottish Open	Scotland	(Scotland) Cathy Panton (14)	293 (+1)	1 stroke	(England) Debbie Dowling (Northern Ireland) Maureen Garner (England) Alison Nicholas	6,000	
4 Sep	Variety Club Celebrity Classic	England	(England) Alison Nicholas (4)	204 (−12)	4 strokes	(Scotland) Dale Reid	6,500	
11 Sep	Godiva Ladies European Masters	Belgium	(Australia) Karen Lunn (2)	276 (−16)	2 strokes	(France) Marie-Laure de Lorenzi-Taya	15,000	
18 Sep	Ladies Italian Open	Italy	(England) Laura Davies (8)	269 (−19)	9 strokes	(France) Marie-Laure de Lorenzi-Taya	10,500	
25 Sep	Toshiba Players Championship	England	(Scotland) Dale Reid (18)	294 (+2)	Playoff	(United States) Peggy Conley	7,500	
2 Oct	James Capel Guernsey Open	Guernsey	(England) Alison Nicholas (5)	274	2 strokes	(South Africa) Alison Sheard	6,000	
9 Oct	Laing Ladies Classic	England	(France) Marie-Laure de Lorenzi-Taya (7)	203	7 strokes	(England) Caroline Griffiths	6,000	
16 Oct	Biarritz Ladies Open	France	(England) Laura Davies (9)	267 (−9)	1 stroke	(France) Marie-Laure de Lorenzi-Taya	7,500	New tournament
30 Oct	Woolmark Ladies Match Play Championship	Spain	(France) Marie-Laure de Lorenzi-Taya (8)	4 and 2		(England) Alison Nicholas	10,000	Match play event
3 Nov	Qualitair Spanish Open	Spain	(France) Marie-Laure de Lorenzi-Taya (9)	207 (−12)	4 strokes	(France) Corinne Soules	6,000	
13 Nov	Benson & Hedges Trophy	Spain	(Zimbabwe) Mark McNulty & (France) Marie-Laure de Lorenzi-Taya	276 (−12)	1 stroke	(Spain) José María Cañizares & (Spain) Tania Abitbol		Mixed-team event (unofficial)

Major championships in bold.

== Order of Merit rankings ==
Rank	Player	Prize money (£)
1	(France) Marie-Laure de Lorenzi-Taya	99,360
2	(England) Alison Nicholas	76,400
3	(Australia) Corinne Dibnah	66,900
4	(Scotland) Dale Reid	56,005
5	(United States) Peggy Conley	47,967
6	(Australia) Karen Lunn	47,455
7	(Scotland) Cathy Panton	45,463
8	(England) Laura Davies	41,871
9	(England) Kitrina Douglas	37,879
10	(England) Debbie Dowling	30,731

== See also ==
- 1988 LPGA Tour
