= 1981 Ladies European Tour =

Golf tournament series

1981 Ladies European Tour season
- Duration: May 1981 – October 1981
- Number of official events: 18
- Order of Merit: (England) Jenny Lee Smith

The 1981 Ladies European Tour was the third season of golf tournaments organised by the Women's Professional Golfers' Association (WPGA), which later became the Ladies European Tour (LET). There were 13 tournaments on the schedule including four Carlsberg sponsored events and the Women's British Open, organised by the Ladies' Golf Union.

For the 1981 season, the majority of tournaments were increased to 54-holes, having previously been held over 36-holes. This included the Carlsberg events, which were reduced in number, from ten down to four, in order to increase the prize funds at each event. Total prize money on the tour was planned to rise to £250,000 in 1981, but the tour suffered financially during the season as several tournaments were cancelled after sponsors withdrew their support.

The Order of Merit was won by Jenny Lee Smith, who dominated the season with three wins and four runner-up finishes; her £13,518 in prize money put her more than £5,000 clear of runner-up Cathy Panton. The Carlsberg European Championship overall title was won by Panton, who won two of the four events.

== Tournaments ==
The table below shows the 1981 schedule. The numbers in brackets after the winners' names show the number of career wins they had on the Ladies European Tour up to and including that event. This is only shown for members of the tour.

Date	Tournament	Location	Winner	Score	Margin of victory	Runner(s)–up	Winner's share (£)	Ref
1 May	Carlsberg Championship – St Pierre	Wales	(England) Mickey Walker (3)	222 (+6)	2 strokes	(England) Sue Latham	1,500	
11 May	Sports Space Championship	England	(England) Jenny Lee Smith (6)	72 (−1)	2 strokes	(England) Christine Langford (Scotland) Cathy Panton	600	
22 May	Carlsberg Championship – Queen's Park	England	(Scotland) Cathy Panton (4)	223 (+1)	1 stroke	(England) Christine Langford	1,500	
30 May	Smirnoff Ulster Open	Northern Ireland	(United States) Sarah LeVeque (1)	228 (E)	Playoff	(England) Christine Langford	600	
6 Jun	United Friendly Tournament	England	(United States) Sarah LeVeque (2)	220 (+7)	8 strokes	(Australia) Sherrin Galbraith (Scotland) Cathy Panton		
19 Jun	Carlsberg Championship – Moortown	England	(Scotland) Cathy Panton (5)	213 (−9)	3 strokes	(England) Jenny Lee Smith	1,500	
28 Jun	Volvo International Tournament	Sweden	(England) Beverly Lewis (1)	147 (+5)	3 strokes	(Sweden) Kärstin Ehrnlund		
3 Jul	McEwan's Lager Welsh Classic	Wales	(England) Jenny Lee Smith (7)	216 (E)	2 strokes	(Scotland) Muriel Thomson	1,500	
24 Jul	Elizabeth Ann Classic	England	(Scotland) Muriel Thomson (4)	293 (+1)	1 stroke	(England) Jenny Lee Smith	1,500	
1 Aug	**Women's British Open**	England	(United States) Debbie Massey (n/a)	295 (−1)	4 strokes	(Scotland) Belle Robertson (a)	5,600	
8 Aug	Ladies Irish Open	Ireland	Cancelled					
14 Aug	Carlsberg Championship – Gleneagles	England	(Scotland) Dale Reid (2)	219 (+3)	1 stroke	(England) Jenny Lee Smith	1,500	
21 Aug	Hitachi WPGA Championship	England	Cancelled					
13 Sep	Moben Kitchens Classic	England	(Scotland) Dale Reid (3)	213 (−6)	6 strokes	(England) Jenny Lee Smith	900	
18 Sep	Barnham Broom Championship	England	Cancelled					
17 Oct	Lambert & Butler Matchplay	England	(England) Jenny Lee Smith (8)	3 and 2		(England) Beverly Lewis	3,000	

Major championship in bold.

== Order of Merit ==
The Order of Merit was sponsored by Hambro Life and based on prize money won throughout the season.

Place	Player	Money (£)	Events
1	(England) Jenny Lee Smith	13,518	11
2	(Scotland) Cathy Panton	8,410	
3	(Scotland) Muriel Thomson	8,143	13
4	(Scotland) Dale Reid	7,321	
5	(England) Beverly Lewis	6,534	
6	(England) Christine Langford	5,290	
7	(England) Mickey Walker	4,844	
8	(England) Jane Chapman	4,583	
9	(England) Maxine Burton	4,120	
10	(England) Sue Latham	4,118	

== See also ==
- 1981 LPGA Tour
