= Trusthouse Forte Ladies' Classic =

Women's professional golf tournament

Tournament information
- Location: Madrid, Spain (1985); Köln, Germany (1986)
- Established: 1985
- Courses: Golf- und Land-Club Köln; Club de Campo Villa de Madrid
- Tour: Ladies European Tour
- Format: 72-hole Stroke play
- Final year: 1986

Tournament record score
- Aggregate: 280 Corinne Dibnah
- To par: −12 as above

Final champion
- (Australia) Corinne Dibnah

The Trusthouse Forte Ladies' Classic was a women's professional golf tournament on the Ladies European Tour. In 1985 it was held at Club de Campo Villa de Madrid in Spain, and for 1986 it moved to Cologne in Germany.

== Winners ==
Year	Date	Venue	Winner	Score	Margin of victory	Runner-up	Winner's share (£)
Trusthouse Forte Ladies' Classic
1986	6 Jul	Golf- und Land-Club Köln	(Australia) Corinne Dibnah	280 (−12)	2 strokes	(Scotland) Gillian Stewart	6,000
Trusthouse Forte Classic
1985	10 Aug	Club de Campo Villa de Madrid	(England) Beverly Huke	289 (−3)	1 stroke	(Australia) Corinne Dibnah	5,000
