= Wirral Classic =

Tournament information
- Location: Caldy, Wirral Peninsula, England
- Established: 1983
- Course(s): Caldy GC
- Tour(s): Ladies European Tour
- Format: Stroke play
- Final year: 1988

Final champion
- (England) Beverley New

The Wirral Classic was a women's professional golf tournament on the Ladies European Tour held in England. It was played annually between 1983 and 1988 in Caldy on the Wirral Peninsula in Merseyside, near Liverpool.

== Winners ==
Year	Winner	Score	Margin of victory	Runner(s)-up	Winner's share (£)
Broadway Wirral Classic
1988	(England) Beverley New	283 (−14)	3 strokes	(Scotland) Cathy Panton	£4,500
McEwan's Wirral Classic
1987	(England) Trish Johnson	292 (−4)	Playoff	(Australia) Karen Lunn	£3,750
1986	(England) Laura Davies	285 (−11)	3 strokes	(England) Penny Grice-Whittaker (England) Beverley New (Scotland) Dale Reid	£3,000
McEwan's Wirral Caldy Classic
1985	(Scotland) Cathy Panton	291 (−5)	3 strokes	(England) Laura Davies (England) Penny Grice	£2,000
Wirral Caldy Classic
1984	(United States) Lori Castillo	215 (−7)	2 strokes	(United States) Nancy Hoins (England) Alison Nicholas	£890
Caldy Classic
1983	(Scotland) Dale Reid	225 (+3)	1 stroke	(England) Maxine Burton (England) Jo Rumsey	£700
