= Caryn Louw =

South African professional golfer

Personal information
- Nationality: South Africa
- Born: 12 February 1968 (age 58) Johannesburg, South Africa
- Height: 5 ft 11 in (180 cm)

Career
- Sport: Golf
- College: University of Tulsa
- Turned professional: 1990
- Former tours: Ladies European Tour (1991–2002); LPGA Tour (1999); LPGA Futures Tour; Sunshine Ladies Tour
- Professional wins: 1

Number of wins by tour
- Ladies European Tour: 1

Achievements and awards
- South Africa WPGA Achiever of the Year: 2011

Caryn Louw (born 12 February 1968) is a South African professional golfer. She played mainly on the Ladies European Tour, where she won the 1996 Open de España Femenino at La Manga Club.

== Career ==
Louw was introduced to golf at the age of 16, and moved from a 36 to a 3 handicap within a year. In 1987, she won the South African Women's Amateur Championship at Royal Johannesburg & Kensington Golf Club. She attended the University of Tulsa and won the 1988 NCAA women's golf championship with the Tulsa Golden Hurricane women's golf team, alongside Melissa McNamara and Kelly Robbins.

Louw turned professional in 1990 and joined the Ladies European Tour (LET) in 1991, where she went on to convincingly win the 1996 season finale Open de España Femenino four strokes ahead of home player Amaia Arruti.

After stints on the LPGA Tour in 1999 and the LPGA Futures Tour in 2000, she returned to the LET in 2001. Following two seasons on the LET and a handful on the Nedbank Women's Golf Tour, predecessor to the Sunshine Ladies Tour, she retired from tour and became a teaching professional.

== Amateur wins ==
- 1987 South African Women's Amateur Championship

== Professional wins (1) ==
=== Ladies European Tour wins (1) ===
No.	Date	Tournament	Winning score	Margin of victory	Runner-up
1	2 Nov 1996	Open de España Femenino	−10 (69-70-67=206)	4 strokes	(Spain) Amaia Arruti
