= British Olivetti Tournament =

Tournament information
- Location: Birmingham, West Midlands, England
- Established: 1983
- Course: Moor Hall Golf Club
- Par: 73
- Tour: Ladies European Tour
- Format: 72-hole Stroke play
- Prize fund: £30,000
- Month played: May
- Final year: 1988

Tournament record score
- Aggregate: 283 Alison Nicholas (1988)
- To par: −9 as above

Final champion
- (England) Alison Nicholas

Location map
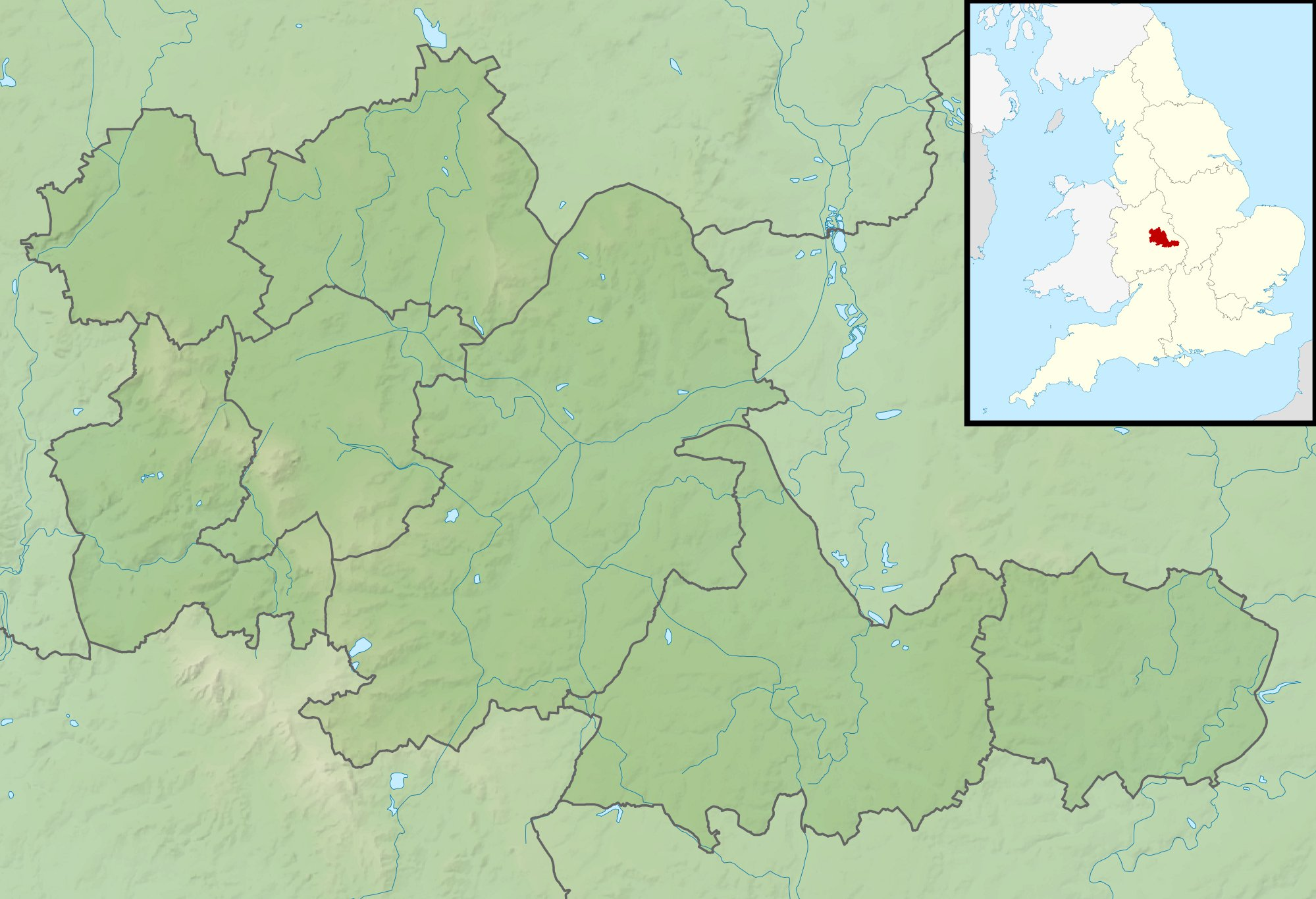
- Location in England Location in West Midlands

The British Olivetti Tournament was a women's professional golf tournament on the Ladies European Tour held in England, played between 1983 and 1988.

== History ==
The tournament, sponsored by Italian electronics manufacturer Olivetti , was first played in 1983 at Old Thorns Golf Club in Liphook, East Hampshire. It was held annually until 1988, the last four installments at Moor Hall Golf Club in Sutton Coldfield in the city of Birmingham, West Midlands.

== Winners ==
Year	Winner	Score	Margin of victory	Runner-up	Purse (£)	Venue	Ref
1988	(England) Alison Nicholas	−9 (71-72-69-71=283)	1 stroke	(Scotland) Jane Connachan	30,000	Moor Hall GC	
1987	(Scotland) Jane Connachan	−6 (69-73-72-72=286)	Playoff	(England) Trish Johnson	25,000	Moor Hall GC	
1986	(Scotland) Dale Reid	−7 (73-71-70-71=285)	Playoff	(England) Laura Davies	20,000	Moor Hall GC	
1985	(Scotland) Jane Connachan	−8 (73-72-71-68=284)	1 stroke	(Scotland) Dale Reid	15,000	Moor Hall GC	
1984	(England) Jenny Lee Smith	+6 (75-71-73-75=294)	1 stroke	(South Africa) Rae Hast	10,000	Old Thorns GC	
1983	(Australia) Sandra Mackenzie	+7 (78-73-72=223)	1 stroke	(England) Jane Forrest	7,500	Old Thorns GC	
