= Ford Ladies' Classic =

Tournament information
- Location: England
- Established: 1982
- Courses: Woburn Golf and Country Club; Chart Hills Golf Club
- Tour: Ladies European Tour
- Format: 54 or 72-hole Stroke play
- Prize fund: £100,000
- Final year: 2000

Tournament record score
- Aggregate: 280 Dale Reid
- To par: −16 as above

Final champion
- (Australia) Gina Scott

The Ford Ladies' Classic was a women's professional golf tournament in England on the Ladies European Tour (LET).

The tournament was held at Woburn Golf and Country Club in Milton Keynes, Buckinghamshire; first played on the Duke's Course (1982–84), it moved to the Duchess Course in 1985. In 1995 it moved to Chart Hills Golf Club in Biddenden, Kent, where it returned once again five years later with a new title sponsor.

== Winners ==
Year	Winner	Score	Margin of victory	Runner(s)-up	Purse (£)	Venue
Kronenbourg 1664 Chart Hills Classic
2000	(Australia) Gina Scott	207 (−9)	Playoff (Note: Scott won with par on second extra hole)	(Italy) Isabella Maconi	100,000	Chart Hills
1996–1999: No tournament
Ford Golf Classic
1995	(England) Lora Fairclough	277 (−11)	1 stroke	(Belgium) Florence Descampe	110,000	Chart Hills
1994	(Sweden) Catrin Nilsmark	284 (−12)	4 strokes	(England) Trish Johnson (England) Joanne Morley	100,000	Woburn (Duchess)
1993	(Italy) Federica Dassù	289 (−7)	1 stroke	(Sweden) Annika Sörenstam	70,000	Woburn (Duchess)
Ford Ladies' Classic
1992	(Italy) Stefania Croce	286 (−10)	3 strokes	(England) Trish Johnson (Switzerland) Evelyn Orley	65,000	Woburn (Duchess)
1991	(Scotland) Dale Reid	280 (−16)	1 stroke	(England) Alison Nicholas	65,000	Woburn (Duchess)
1990	(France) Marie-Laure de Lorenzi (2)	284 (−12)	3 strokes	(South Africa) Laurette Maritz	65,000	Woburn (Duchess)
1989	(France) Marie-Laure de Lorenzi	286 (−10)	8 strokes	(Scotland) Gillian Stewart	50,000	Woburn (Duchess)
1988	(England) Laura Davies	292 (−4)	1 stroke	(Australia) Corinne Dibnah	40,000	Woburn (Duchess)
1987	(Scotland) Gillian Stewart (2)	289 (−7)	Playoff	(Australia) Corinne Dibnah	30,000	Woburn (Duchess)
1986	(Scotland) Muriel Thomson	290 (−6)	1 stroke	(England) Alison Nicholas	30,000	Woburn (Duchess)
1985	(Scotland) Gillian Stewart	296 (−4)	Playoff (Note: Stewart won with birdie on first extra hole)	(Scotland) Muriel Thomson	20,000	Woburn (Duchess)
1984	(England) Kitrina Douglas	292 (−8)	4 strokes	(United States) Peggy Conley	20,000	Woburn (Duke)
1983	(West Germany) Barbara Helbig	298 (−2)	4 strokes	(Spain) Marta Figueras-Dotti	20,000	Woburn (Duke)
1982	(England) Jenny Lee Smith	305 (+9)	4 strokes	(Scotland) Dale Reid	20,000	Woburn (Duke)
