= Sunningdale Foursomes =

Foursomes golf tournament

Tournament information
- Location: Sunningdale, Berkshire, England
- Established: 1934
- Course: Sunningdale Golf Club
- Format: Foursomes match play
- Month played: March

The Sunningdale Foursomes is an open foursomes golf tournament contested at the Sunningdale Golf Club, Berkshire, in March. It was first contested in 1934 and has been held annually since, except between 1940 and 1947. The event is open to all golfers. Players are handicapped based only on whether they are male or female, professional or amateur.

== Format ==
The event is played over four days each March at Sunningdale Golf Club and is open to all golfers. Any combination of male or female, professional or amateur, is allowed. The format is foursomes match play, the field being limited to 128 pairs. For the first two rounds both the Old and New courses are used, but thereafter only the Old course is used. Players are handicapped based solely on whether they are male or female, professional or amateur.

== Handicaps ==
The handicaps have varied slightly over the years. The current handicaps are:

- Male professionals: +1
- Male amateurs: 0
- Female professionals: 2
- Female amateurs: 3

Before 2023 female amateurs received a handicap of 4,

All competitors play from the same tees. Currently pairs receive the full difference of the combined handicaps, so that two female amateurs will receive 8 strokes from two male professionals.

== Winners ==
Year	Winners	Margin of victory	Runners-up	Ref
1934	Diana Fishwick & Noel Layton	2 & 1	Molly Gourlay & Geoffrey Hawkins	
1935	Joyce Wethered & John Morrison	3 & 2	Pam Barton & Leslie Garnett	
1936	Joyce Wethered & John Morrison	5 & 4	Dennis Kyle & William Aitken	
1937	Stanley Anderson & Dai Rees	5 & 4	George Hannay & Bob French	
1938	Pam Barton & Alf Padgham	19 holes	Leonard Crawley & Francis Francis	
1939	Cornelis Rissik & Bob Kenyon	19 holes	Corrin Bell & Cecil Denny	
1940–1947 Suspended during World War II
1948	Wanda Morgan & Sam King	2 & 1	Philip Risdon & Dick Burton	
1949	Bob French & Stewart Field	1 up	Jacqueline Gordon & Jack Knipe	
1950	Max Faulkner & Jack Knipe	6 & 5	Francis Francis & Arthur Lees	
1951	Jean Donald & Tom Haliburton	3 & 2	Alan Poulton & Bob French	
1952	Philip Scrutton & Alan Waters	2 & 1	Alan Poulton & Bob French	
1953	Jean Donald & Tom Haliburton	3 & 2	Dennis Smalldon & Graham Knipe	
1954	Philip Scrutton & Alan Waters	4 & 3	Peter Mills & Tony Harman	
1955	Bill Sharp & Syd Scott	2 & 1	Bob French & Eddie Ward	
1956	Graham Knipe & Dennis Smalldon	3 & 2	Leonard Crawley & George Foster	
1957	Brian Huggett & Ross Whitehead	1 up	Robin Galloway & Sandy Robertson	
1958	Jean Donald & Peter Alliss	1 up	David Beard & Brian Bamford	
1959	Michael Bonallack & Doug Sewell	5 & 3	Tony Slark & Peter Gill	
1960	Belle McCorkindale & Maurice Moir	19 holes	Hugh Squirrell & Sid Mouland	
1961	Jean Anderson & Peter Alliss	2 & 1	Wally Dubabney & Tony Grubb	
1962	Neil Coles & Ross Whitehead	3 & 2	Michael Burgess & Martin Christmas	
1963	Lionel Platts & David Snell	4 & 3	Keith MacDonald & Ian MacDonald	
1964	Bruce Critchley & Robin Hunter	2 & 1	Peter Green & Michael Burgess	
1965	Marley Spearman & Tony Fisher	1 up	Michael Burgess & Peter Green	
1966	Robin Davenport & Sandy Walker	4 & 3	Freddie Sunderland & Graham Burroughs	
1967	Neil Coles & Keith Warren	19 holes	Brigitte Varangot & Clive Clark	
1968	John Davies & Warren Humphreys	6 & 4	Max Faulkner & Brian Barnes	
1969	Peter Benka & Peter Oosterhuis	3 & 2	Catherine Lacoste & Jean-Michel Larretche	
1970	Anne Willard & Bob Barrell	2 & 1	Mary Everard & Robin Hunter	
1971	Alan Bird & Harry Flatman	3 & 2	Kathryn Phillips & John Putt	
1972	John Davies & Michael King	6 & 5	John Tullis & Tony Howard	
1973	John Putt & Mary Everard	6 & 5	Carl Mason & Howard Clark	
1974	Clive Clark & Peter Butler	1 up	Howard Clark & Nick Brunyard	
1975	Abandoned due to snow			
1976	Clive Clark & Mike Hughesdon	2 & 1	Bernard Hunt & Ian Stungo	
1977	Geoffrey Hunt & David Matthew	3 & 2	David Huish & Garry Logan	
1978	Julia Greenhalgh & Alex Caygill	5 & 4	Carole Caldwell & Arnold Stickley	
1979	George Will & Roger Chapman	3 & 2	Neil Coles & Doug McClelland	
1980	Neil Coles & Doug McClelland	2 & 1	John O'Leary & Carl Mason	
1981	Alan Lyddon & Gordon Brand Jnr.	1 up	Michael King & Mark Dixon	
1982	Christine Langford & Mickey Walker	1 up	Maureen Madill & Mary McKenna	
1983	John Davies & Martin Devetta	4 & 3	Linda Bayman & Mike Hughesdon	
1984	Maureen Madill & Mary McKenna	3 & 2	Mickey Walker & Christine Langford	
1985	John O'Leary & Sam Torrance	25 holes	Bernard Gallacher & Pat Garner	
1986	Ronan Rafferty & Roger Chapman	1 up	Maureen Garner & Mary McKenna	
1987	Ian Mosey & Warren Humphreys	3 & 2	Gillian Stewart & David Huish	
1988	Carl Mason & Andrew Chandler	5 & 3	Maureen Garner & Mary McKenna	
1989	Andrew Hare & Russell Claydon	4 & 3	Vicki Thomas & Julie Wade	
1990	Corinne Dibnah & Dale Reid	7 & 6	Tracey Craik & Peter Hughes	
1991	Jeremy Robinson & Wayne Henry	4 & 3	Bruce Critchley & Robin Hunter	
1992	Richard Boxall & Derrick Cooper	3 & 2	Paul Sherman & Paul Page	
1993	Andy Beal & Lee S. James	2 & 1	David Wood & Lloyd Warwick	
1994	Anthony Wall & Steve Webster	2 up	David Howell & Gary Harris	
1995	Richard Boxall & Derrick Cooper	2 & 1	Iain Mackenzie & Malcolm Mackenzie	
1996	Luke Donald & Michael O’Connor	2 & 1	Julie Forbes & Gillian Stewart	
1997	Julie Hall & Helen Wadsworth	4 & 3	Jeremy Robinson & David R. Jones	
1998	Warren Bennett & David Fisher	4 & 3	Richard Hodgkinson & Philip Carr	
1999	Liza Walters & Richard McEvoy	5 & 4	Bill McColl & Stephen Shields	
2000	Carole Caldwell & Richard Caldwell	2 & 1	Johanna Head & Samantha Head	
2001	Clare Lipscombe & Stewart Little	2 & 1	Trish Johnson & Jamie Spence	
2002	John Kemp & Mark Wharton	1 up	Glenn Ralph & Tim Spence	
2003	Ross Fisher & Simon Griffiths	4 & 3	Pip Elson & Jamie Elson	
2004	Ross Fisher & Simon Griffiths	6 & 5	Joe Templer & Richard Campbell	
2005	Paul Jenkinson & Gary Lockerbie	2 & 1	Chris Rodgers & Barry Monks	
2006	Danielle Masters & Ben Evans	2 & 1	James Morrison & Colin Roope	
2007	James Mason & Neil Walker	2 up	James Freeman & Robert Steele	
2008	Craig Cowper & Neil Reilly	1 up	Rachel Drummond & Matt Haines	
2009	Stiggy Hodgson & John Stansbury	3 & 2	Tom Shadbolt & Mark Laskey	
2010	Neil Reilly & Craig Cowper	1 up	Charlotte Wild & Nikki Foster	
2011	Sebastian Crookall-Nixon & James Atkinson	1 up	Hayley Davis & Scott Godfrey	
2012	Jess Wilcox & Greg Payne	3 & 1	James Little & Liam Bond	
2013	Phillip Archer & Sam Walker	19 holes	Steven Tiley & Ricki Neil Jones	
2014	Annabel Dimmock & Steven Brown	1 up	Inci Mehmet & Oscar Granström-Livesey	
2015	Charlotte Austwick & Jack Clarke	1 up	Matthew Southgate & Simon Wakefield	
2016	Sophie Lamb & Marco Penge	5 & 4	Lewis Atkinson & Scott Marshall	
2017	Graham Powell & Henry Smart	5 & 4	Ryan Harrison & James Johnson	
2018	Cancelled due to snow			
2019	Linn Grant & Maja Stark	2 up	Joe Sullivan & Louis Hirst	
2020	Lily May Humphreys & Will Percival	1 up	Ben Holden & Roger Chapman	
2021	Cancelled because of the COVID-19 pandemic			
2022	Lottie Woad & Rachel Gourley	6 & 5	Jimmy Ruth & Paul Hendriksen	
2023	Cancelled due to snow			
2024	Harley Smith & Dylan Shaw Radford	5 & 4	William Shucksmith & Darryl Gwilliam	
