= Open de España Femenino =

Tournament information
- Location: Málaga, Andalusia, Spain
- Established: 1982
- Course: Real Guadalhorce Club de Golf
- Par: 72
- Length: 6,336 yards (5,794 m)
- Tour: Ladies European Tour
- Format: Stroke play – 72 holes
- Prize fund: €700,000
- Month played: November

Current champion
- (France) Nastasia Nadaud

Final champion
- Location in Europe Location in Spain

The Spanish Women's Open (in Spanish: Open de España Femenino) is a professional golf tournament in Spain that has been part of the Ladies European Tour (LET) schedule since 1982.

In 2002, the tournament became the official national open golf championship of Spain, sanctioned by the Real Federación Española de Golf.

Since 2018, it has served as the season finale of the LET, except in 2019.

== Winners ==
Year	Winner	Country	Score	Winner's share (€)	Venue
Andalucia Costa Del Sol Open de España
2025	Nastasia Nadaud	France	272 (–16)	105,000	Real Guadalhorce Club de Golf
2024	Carlota Ciganda (2)	Spain	270 (–18)	105,000	Real Guadalhorce Club de Golf
2023	Aditi Ashok	India	271 (–17)	97,500	Real Club de Golf Las Brisas
2022	Caroline Hedwall	Sweden	274 (–18)	97,500	Villa Padierna Golf Club (Alferini)
2021	Carlota Ciganda	Spain	273 (–15)	90,000	Los Naranjos Golf Club
2020	Emily Kristine Pedersen	Denmark	273 (–15)	45,000	Real Club de Golf Guadalmina
2019	Anne van Dam (2)	Netherlands	275 (–13)	45,000	Aloha Golf Club
2018	Anne van Dam	Netherlands	271 (–13)	45,000	La Quinta Golf & Country Club
2017	Azahara Muñoz (2)	Spain	269 (–19)	45,000	Real Club de Golf Guadalmina
2016	Azahara Muñoz	Spain	278 (–10)	45,000	Aloha Golf Club
2015: No tournament
Open de España Femenino
2014	Connie Chen	South Africa	276 (–12)	52,500	Golf Costa Adeje
2013	Lee-Anne Pace	South Africa	275 (–13)	52,500	Club de Campo Villa de Madrid
2012	Stacey Keating	Australia	279 (–9)	52,500	Golf Las Américas
2011	Melissa Reid	England	280 (–8)	52,500	La Quinta Golf & Country Club
2010	Laura Davies	England	202 (–11)	52,500	Villa Padierna Golf Club (Flamingos)
2009	Becky Brewerton	Wales	270 (–18)	41,250	Panorámica Club de Golf
2008	Emma Zackrisson	Sweden	281 (–7)	41,250	Panorámica Club de Golf
2007	Nikki Garrett	Australia	275 (–13)	41,250	Club de Campo del Mediterráneo
2006	Lynnette Brooky	New Zealand	275 (–13)	41,250	Panorámica Club de Golf
2005	Iben Tinning	Denmark	273 (–15)	41,250	Panorámica Club de Golf
2004	Stéphanie Arricau	France	279 (–9)	41,250	Club de Golf La Coruña
2003	Federica Dassù	Italy	282 (–6)	37,500	Campos de Golf de Salamanca
2002	Karine Icher	France	277 (–11)	37,500	Campos de Golf de Salamanca
1997–2001: No tournament
La Manga Club Spanish Open
1996	Caryn Louw	South Africa	206 (–10)	£9,000	La Manga Club
1995	Rachel Hetherington	Australia	202 (–14)	£7,800	La Manga Club
1994	Marie-Laure de Lorenzi (2)	France	282 (–6)	£9,000	La Manga Club
1993: No tournament
Skol La Manga Club Classic
1992	Trish Johnson	England	274 (–10)	£9,000	La Manga Club
La Manga Club Classic
1991	Corinne Dibnah (2)	Australia	286 (+2)	£10,500	La Manga Club
1990: No tournament
Qualitair Classic
1989	Alison Nicholas	England	213 (−3)	£7,500	La Manga Club
Qualitair Ladies Spanish Open
1988	Marie-Laure Taya	France	207 (–15)	£6,000	La Manga Club
1987	Corinne Dibnah	Australia	276 (–12)	£4,500	La Manga Club
La Manga Spanish Open
1986	Laura Davies	England	286 (–10)	£3,750	La Manga Club
1985	Alison Sheard	South Africa	285 (–11)	£2,500	La Manga Club
1984	Maxine Burton	England	286 (–10)	£1,800	La Manga Club
1983: No tournament
Ladies Spanish Open
1982	Rosie Jones	United States	224 (+8)	£900	Las Aves

== See also ==
- Open de España
