= Connie Chen =

South African professional golfer

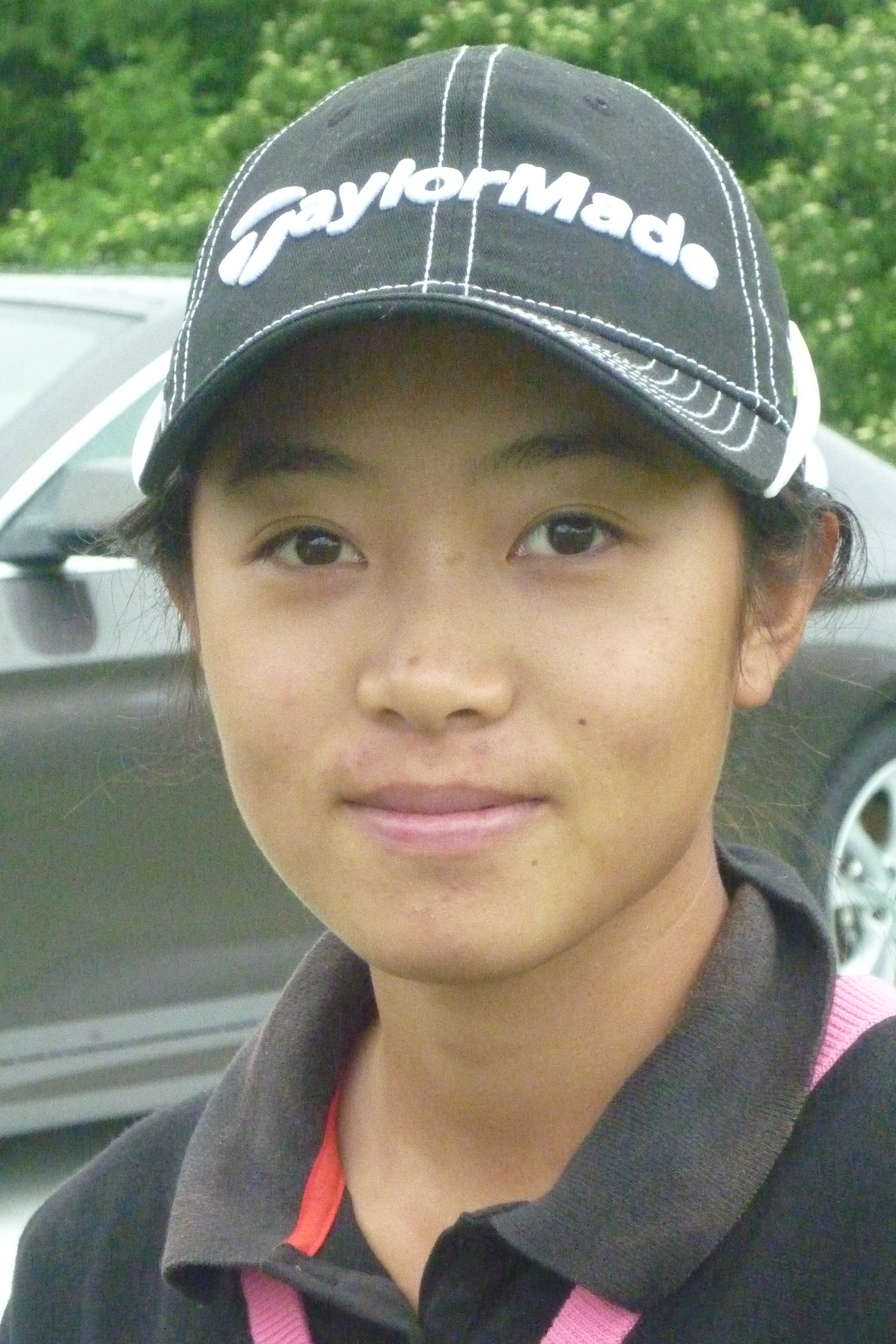

Personal information
- Nationality: South Africa
- Born: 26 October 1992 (age 34) Pretoria, South Africa
- Height: 1.65 m (5 ft 5 in)

Career
- Sport: Golf
- College: University of Birmingham
- Turned professional: 2010
- Current tours: Ladies European Tour; China LPGA Tour
- Professional wins: 1

Number of wins by tour
- Ladies European Tour: 1

Achievements and awards
- WGSA Amateur Player of the Year: 2010

Connie Chen (born 26 October 1992) is a South African professional golfer who has played on the Ladies European Tour. She won the 2014 Open De España Femenino, which was her first title on the tour.

== Amateur career ==
Chen started playing golf at the age of ten, and first represented South Africa aged 15 at the 2008 Junior Open Championship. She continued her international career by playing for South Africa at the Annika Invitational and The British Girls Championship in 2009 and 2010, and then The Duke of York Invitational in 2010. She more than ten amateur events in 2010 and was a member of the South African team at the 2010 Espirito Santo Trophy, finishing third.

She earned the 2010 Compleat Golfer South African Woman Golfer of the Year Award by the Women's Golf South African Association (WGSA).

== Professional career ==
After her 18th birthday, she turned professional and qualified for the 2011 Ladies European Tour season. Chen made a hole in one at the 2013 Omega Dubai Ladies Masters winning a car. The following year she had her maiden win on the Ladies European Tour when she won the 2014 Open de España Femenino in Tenerife, Spain.

At the end of 2014, Chen started her PGA studies and became a full member of the PGA UK&I in early 2018. In 2020 Chen was featured as one of Golf Digest's Top 75 Best International Teachers. She played on the Chinese LPGA tour over the following seasons while also coaching around the world.

== Ladies European Tour wins (1) ==
No.	Date	Tournament	Winning score	Margin of victory	Runner-up
1	2014	Tenerife Open de Espana Femenino	−12 (68-70-69-69=276)	2 strokes	(Spain) Carlota Ciganda

== Team appearances ==
Amateur

- Espirito Santo Trophy (representing South Africa): 2010

== Awards and other recognition ==
- Compleat Golfer South African Woman Golfer of the Year award 2010
- Golf Digest Top 75 International Coach 2020
