= 1986 Ladies European Tour =

Golf tournaments

1986 Ladies European Tour season
- Duration: May 1986 – October 1986
- Number of official events: 20
- Order of Merit: (England) Laura Davies

The 1986 Ladies European Tour was a series of golf tournaments for elite female golfers from around the world which took place in 1986. The tournaments were sanctioned by the Ladies European Tour (LET).

== Tournaments ==
The table below shows the 1986 schedule. The numbers in brackets after the winners' names show the number of career wins they had on the Ladies European Tour up to and including that event. This is only shown for members of the tour.

| Date | Tournament | Location | Winner | Score | Margin of victory | Runner(s)-up | Winner's share (£) | Note |
|---|---|---|---|---|---|---|---|---|
| 3 May | Ford Ladies Classic | England | (Scotland) Muriel Thomson (8) | 290 (−6) | 1 stroke | (England) Alison Nicholas | 4,500 | |
| 11 May | Hennessy Cognac Ladies Cup | France | (United States) Kelly Leadbetter (1) | 293 (+5) | 1 stroke | (Australia) Karen Lunn | 9,000 | |
| 18 May | Portuguese Ladies Open | Portugal | (Scotland) Cathy Panton (12) | 286 (−6) | Playoff | (United States) Kelly Leadbetter (Scotland) Gillian Stewart | 3,750 | |
| 24 May | British Olivetti Tournament | England | (Scotland) Dale Reid (12) | 285 (−7) | Playoff | (England) Laura Davies | 3,000 | |
| 2 Jun | Ulster Volkswagen Classic | Northern Ireland | (England) Beverly Huke (7) | 213 (−6) | 1 stroke | (United States) Peggy Conley | 3,000 | |
| 8 Jun | British Midland Ladies Irish Open | Northern Ireland | (Scotland) Muriel Thomson (9) | 290 (−10) | 6 strokes | (Sweden) Liselotte Neumann | 3,750 | |
| 14 Jun | McEwan's Wirral Classic | England | (England) Laura Davies (2) | 285 (−11) | 3 strokes | (England) Penny Grice-Whittaker (England) Beverley New (Scotland) Dale Reid | 3,000 | |
| 22 Jun | Belgian Ladies Godiva Open | Belgium | (England) Penny Grice-Whittaker (1) | 275 (−17) | 9 strokes | (Scotland) Gillian Stewart | 7,500 | |
| 29 Jun | Volmac Ladies Open | Netherlands | (England) Jane Forrest (1) | 282 (−6) | 5 strokes | (Sweden) Liselotte Neumann | 6,750 | New tournament |
| 6 Jul | Trusthouse Forte Ladies' Classic | Germany | (Australia) Corinne Dibnah (1) | 280 (−12) | 2 strokes | (Scotland) Gillian Stewart | 6,000 | |
| 3 Aug | Bloor Homes Eastleigh Classic | England | (England) Debbie Dowling (4) | 254 (−10) | 6 strokes | (England) Alison Nicholas | 3,000 | |
| 10 Aug | BMW Ladies' German Open | Germany | (Sweden) Liselotte Neumann (3) | 282 (−6) | 2 strokes | (England) Alison Nicholas | 6,750 | |
| 24 Aug | Kristianstad Ladies Open | Sweden | (Australia) Corinne Dibnah (2) | 288 (E) | 1 stroke | (Sweden) Liselotte Neumann | 6,000 | |
| 30 Aug | Aspeboda Ladies Open | Sweden | (Australia) Karen Lunn (1) | 212 (−4) | 2 strokes | (United States) Peggy Conley (Sweden) Liselotte Neumann | 6,000 | |
| 6 Sep | Bowring Ladies Scottish Open | England | (United States) Meredith Marshall (1) | 283 (−5) | 7 strokes | (England) Laura Davies | 4,500 | New tournament |
| 13 Sep | Greater Manchester Tournament | England | (England) Laura Davies (3) | 268 (−20) | 3 strokes | (England) Penny Grice-Whittaker | 3,000 | |
| 3 Oct | Mitsubishi Colt Cars Jersey Open | Jersey | (England) Kitrina Douglas (3) | 278 (−6) | 6 strokes | (United States) Peggy Conley | 3,000 | |
| 12 Oct | **British Women's Open** | England | (England) Laura Davies (4) | 283 (−17) | 4 strokes | (United States) Peggy Conley (Spain) Marta Figueras-Dotti | 9,000 | |
| 18 Oct | Laing Ladies Classic | England | (England) Debbie Dowling (5) | 274 (−18) | 1 stroke | (Australia) Corinne Dibnah | 3,750 | |
| 24 Oct | La Manga Spanish Open | Spain | (England) Laura Davies (5) | 286 (−10) | 4 strokes | (Australia) Corinne Dibnah | 3,750 | |

Major championships in bold.

== Order of Merit rankings ==
| Rank | Player | Country | Money (£) |
|---|---|---|---|
| 1 | Laura Davies | England | 37,500 |
| 2 | Liselotte Neumann | Sweden | 37,005 |
| 3 | Corinne Dibnah | Australia | 26,969 |
| 4 | Gillian Stewart | Scotland | 26,395 |
| 5 | Debbie Dowling | England | 25,495 |
| 6 | Peggy Conley | United States | 25,229 |
| 7 | Muriel Thomson | Scotland | 24,960 |
| 8 | Dale Reid | Scotland | 23,892 |
| 9 | Penny Grice-Whittaker | England | 22,694 |
| 10 | Alison Nicholas | England | 21,585 |

== See also ==
- 1986 LPGA Tour
