= Sands International =

Women's professional golf tournament held in England

Tournament information
- Location: Braunton, North Devon, England
- Established: 1983
- Courses: East course, Saunton GC
- Tour: Ladies European Tour
- Format: Stroke play
- Final year: 1985

Tournament record score
- Aggregate: 288 Dale Reid
- To par: −8 As above

Final champion
- (Scotland) Dale Reid

The Sands International was a women's professional golf tournament on the Ladies European Tour held in England. It was played annually between 1983 and 1985 at Saunton Golf Club, near Braunton, North Devon.

== Winners ==
Year	Date	Winner	Score	Margin of victory	Runner-up	Winner's share (£)
Brend Hotels International
1985	28 Sep	(Scotland) Dale Reid	288 (−8)	2 strokes	(Scotland) Muriel Thomson	2,000
Sands International
1984	27 Sep	(Scotland) Muriel Thomson	307 (+11)	1 stroke	(Scotland) Jane Connachan	1,500
1983	19 Oct	(England) Mickey Walker	233 (+11)	1 stroke	(England) Vanessa Marvin	700
