= Barbara Helbig =

German professional golfer

Personal information
- Nationality: Germany
- Born: 14 June 1958 (age 68) Dortmund, West Germany

Career
- Sport: Golf
- Turned professional: 1975
- Former tour: Ladies European Tour
- Professional wins: 1

Number of wins by tour
- Ladies European Tour: 1

Barbara Helbig (born 14 June 1958 in Dortmund) is a German professional golfer. In 1983 she became the first German to win on the Ladies European Tour.

== Career ==
Helbig turned professional in 1975 and joined the Ladies European Tour in 1981. She won the opening tournament of the 1983 season, the Ford Ladies Classic at Woburn Golf and Country Club in England, by 4 strokes over Marta Figueras-Dotti of Spain. With the victory she became the first German winner on the LET. She came close to securing a second victory at the 1985 Ladies German Open, held at Braunfels Castle Golf Club near Frankfurt, where she lost a playoff to Julie Brown of Scotland.

At the 1987 La Manga Club Ladies European Open Helbig made 10 birdies during a round, a Ladies European Tour record behind only Laura Davies' 11 birdies at the inaugural French Ladies Open the same year.

Helbig won the German National Golf Championship 4 times and was runner-up 5 times. She retired from tour in 1991 and served as coach for the German National Team 1991–1996.

== Professional wins (1) ==
=== Ladies European Tour wins (1) ===
No.	Date	Tournament	Winning score	Margin of victory	Runners-up
1	7 May 1983	Ford Ladies Classic	298 (−2)	4 strokes	(Spain) Marta Figueras-Dotti
