= Guernsey Open =

Women's professional golf tournament

Tournament information
- Location: L'Ancresse, Guernsey, Channel Islands
- Established: 1982
- Course(s): Royal Guernsey Golf Club
- Tour(s): Ladies European Tour
- Format: 72-hole stroke play
- Month played: June
- Final year: 1988

Final champion
- (England) Alison Nicholas

The Guernsey Open was a women's professional golf tournament on the Ladies European Tour. It was played from 1982 to 1984 and from 1987 to 1988.

== Winners ==
Year	Winner	Country	Score	Margin of victory	Runner(s)-up
James Capel Guernsey Open
1988	Alison Nicholas	England	274	2 strokes	(South Africa) Alison Sheard
1987	Corinne Dibnah	Australia	275	10 strokes	(England) Vanessa Marvin (Scotland) Gillian Stewart
Guernsey Open
1984	Muriel Thomson	England	280 (−8)	3 strokes	(South Africa) Rae Hast
1983	Marta Figueras-Dotti	Spain	209 (−7)	3 strokes	(England) Beverly Huke
1982	Dale Reid	Scotland	219	3 strokes	(United States) Linda Bowman
