= Barnham Broom Championship =

Women's professional golf tournament in England

Tournament information
- Location: Barnham Broom, Norfolk, England
- Established: 1980
- Course: Barnham Broom GC
- Tour: Ladies European Tour
- Format: 54-hole Stroke play
- Final year: 1980

Tournament record score
- Aggregate: 230 Muriel Thomson
- To par: +8 As above

Final champion
- (Scotland) Muriel Thomson

The Barnham Broom Championship was a women's professional golf tournament on the Ladies European Tour held in England. It was held in October 1980 at Barnham Broom Hotel & Country Club, in Barnham Broom near Norwich, Norfolk. A second tournament was planned for September 1981, but the host venue withdrew their support.

The tournament was won by Muriel Thomson with a score of 230 (eight-over par), four strokes clear of runner-up Maxine Burton.

== Winners ==
Year	Winner	Score	Margin of victory	Runner-up	Winner's share (£)
1980	(Scotland) Muriel Thomson	230 (+8)	4 strokes	(England) Maxine Burton	600
