= Beverly Huke =

English professional golfer

Personal information
- Full name: Beverly Joan Mary Huke
- Nationality: England
- Born: 19 May 1951 (age 75)

Career
- Sport: Golf
- Status: Professional
- Former tour: Ladies European Tour
- Professional wins: 7

Number of wins by tour
- Ladies European Tour: 7

Achievements and awards
- LET Lowest stroke average: 1983
- PGA Honorary Member: 2017

Beverly Joan Mary Huke (born 19 May 1951) is an English professional golfer. She was a founding member of the Women's Professional Golfers' Association (WPGA) and won 7 tournaments on the Ladies European Tour (LET) between 1979 and 1986.

== Career ==
Huke advanced to the final of the 1971 British Ladies Amateur where Mickey Walker won 3 and 1. She represented Great Britain & Ireland at the Vagliano Trophy in 1971 and 1975, and at the Curtis Cup in 1972. She won the English Women's Amateur Championship in 1975 at Royal Birkdale.

After turning professional, Huke won seven tournaments in eight seasons on the LET in Scotland, England, Spain, Germany and Northern Ireland. She was also runner-up by one stroke twice.

In 2017, ahead of the 40 year anniversary of the WPGA, Huke was made Honorary Member of the PGA in recognition of her role as a pioneer of women's professional golf.

== Professional wins (7) ==
=== Ladies European Tour wins (7) ===
#	Date	Tournament	Score	Margin of victory	Runner(s)-up	Winner's share (£)	Ref
1	15 Jun 1979	Carlsberg Championship – Ballater	146 (−2)	1 stroke	(England) Jane Panter (Scotland) Muriel Thomson (England) Mickey Walker	200	
2	23 May 1980	Carlsberg Championship – Blairgowrie	144 (−8)	7 strokes	(United States) Susan Moon (England) Christine Sharp	250	
3	5 Aug 1983	Playford Lark Valley Classic	138 (−4)	Tie with (England) Judy Statham		350	
4	10 Aug 1983	White Horse Whisky Challenge	207 (−12)	1 stroke	(Scotland) Muriel Thomson	600	
5	7 Sep 1984	LBS Ladies' German Open	219 (E)	3 strokes	(England) Kitrina Douglas	1,800	
6	10 Aug 1985	Trusthouse Forte Ladies' Classic	289 (−3)	1 stroke	(Australia) Corinne Dibnah	5,000	
7	1986	Ulster Volkswagen Classic	213 (−6)	1 stroke	(United States) Peggy Conley	3,000	

== Team appearances ==
Amateur

- Vagliano Trophy: (representing Great Britain & Ireland): 1971, 1975
- European Ladies' Team Championship (representring England): 1975, 1977
- Curtis Cup (representing Great Britain & Ireland): 1972
