= Ladies Jersey Open =

Women's Professional Golf Tournament

Tournament information
- Location: Grouville, Jersey, Channel Islands
- Established: 1983
- Course(s): Royal Jersey GC
- Tour(s): Ladies European Tour (1983–1986)
- Format: 72-hole stroke play
- Final year: 1987

Final champion
- (Sweden) Marie Wennersten

The Ladies Jersey Open was a women's professional golf tournament in Jersey, Channel Islands. It was included on the Ladies European Tour from 1983 to 1986.

== Winners ==
Year	Winner	Country	Score	Margin of victory	Runner(s)-up	Winner's share (£)
Hong Kong Bank Jersey Classic
1987	Marie Wennersten	Sweden	148 (+4)	1 stroke	(United States) Peggy Conley (Australia) Corinne Dibnah	£1,000

Ladies European Tour event

Year	Winner	Country	Score	Margin of victory	Runner(s)-up	Winner's share (£)
Mitsubishi Colt Cars Jersey Open
1986	Kitrina Douglas	England	278 (–6)	6 strokes	(United States) Peggy Conley	£3,000
1985	Marie Wennersten	Sweden	211 (–2)	2 strokes	(England) Kitrina Douglas	£2,000
Colt Cars Jersey Open
1984	Jane Connachan	Scotland	279 (–5)	4 strokes	(England) Kitrina Douglas	£1,500
1983	Debbie Dowling	England	215 (+2)	1 stroke	(England) Jenny Lee Smith	£900
