= Kärstin Ehrnlund =

Swedish golfer (born 1959)

Personal information
- Full name: Kärstin Helena Ehrnlund Strand
- Nationality: Sweden
- Born: 10 February 1959 (age 67) Karlstad, Sweden
- Spouse: Erik Strand (m. 1985-)
- Children: 2

Career
- Sport: Golf
- Turned professional: 1979
- Former tour: Ladies European Tour
- Professional wins: 2

Number of wins by tour
- Ladies European Tour: 2

Kärstin Helena Ehrnlund Strand (born 10 February 1959 in Karlstad) is a Swedish professional golfer. She was the first Swedish woman to join a professional golf tour and the first Swede to record a victory on an international tour.

== Early years ==
Ehrnlund's father Sven-Erik was a well-known coach for the local bandy team, Surte Bandy Club, in the 1970s, playing at the highest level in Sweden. Living in the small society Bohus, Sweden, the family started playing golf at nearby Lysegården Golf Club, but soon switched to Gullbringa Golf & Country Club in Kungälv, the same club as were, future LPGA Tour winners, Helen Alfredsson and Carin Koch started their careers a few years later. Ehrnlund found more interest in horse riding at young ages, but allergy against horses forced her to golf instead. It was later found that her allergy was against hay. At 15 years of age, she moved to Palm Springs, California, for six months to practice for Johnny Revolta during the Swedish winter and she came back for the same period the next year.

== Amateur career ==
In 1976, Ehrnlund, 17 years old, reached the final of the Swedish Match-play Championship, losing to Liv Wollin, who won the tournament for the ninth time.

In following years, still at junior age, Ehrnlund dominated Swedish amateur golf, winning the Swedish Match-play Championship in 1977 and 1978, as well as the open amateur championships of Sweden, Germany and Austria in 1978. On the British Isles, she reached the quarter-finals in the 1977 British Girls' Championship at Formby Golf Club, England, and was runner-up at the 1978 Helen Holm Scottish Women's Open Stroke-play Championship at Royal Troon Golf Club, Scotland.

At the end of the 1978 season and her amateur career, she represented Sweden, together with Liv Wollin and Charlotte Montgomery, at the Espirito Santo Trophy in Pacific Harbour, Fiji. High hopes were on the Swedish team, one stroke from second place after three rounds, but with a bad last round from Montgomery and as Ehrnlund was forced to withdraw after the first round, due to food poisoning, Sweden dropped to eighth place.

== Professional career ==
The week after the 1978 Espirito Santo Trophy, Ehrnlund announced that she was turning professional for the 1979 season, with the intention to play on the nascent Women's Professional Golf Association (WPGA) Tour, later renamed Ladies European Tour. With small prize amounts available, she had to rely on sponsor support and usually travelled by car between tournaments, living in a caravan and sometimes with her father as driver and caddie.

In August 1980 Ehrnlund played the Welsh Classic at Whitchurch Golf Club in Cardiff, Wales. She was in the lead after two rounds with 68–74, and when the last round was cancelled due to rain, she was declared the winner. Four years later she won her second Ladies European Tour title, the United Friendly Tournament at two-time Ryder Cup-venue Southport and Ainsdale Golf Club near Liverpool, England.

At the 1981 Volvo International, the second edition of the first Swedish LET Tournament, at, Ehrnlunds new home club, Albatross Golf Club in Gothenburg, Ehrnlund finished second after Bevelry Lewis, England. In 1983, Ehrnlund reached a career best finish of 7th on the Ladies European Tour Order-of-Merit ranking.

Six years after Ehrnlunds first victory on the ladies tour, Ove Sellberg became the first Swede to record a victory on the European Tour in 1986. At this time, Ehrnlund had just retired from competitive golf. Ehrnlund is regarded as an important pioneer in women's professional golf in Sweden and a model for later coming generations, making their successes possible. At the opening of the Swedish Golf Museum in June 2000, she was one of ten players, among names as Annika Sörenstam and Jesper Parnevik, presented as important in the history of Swedish golf.

== Awards and honors, personal life ==
In 1979, Ehrnlund earned Elite Sign No. 64 by the Swedish Golf Federation, on the basis of national team appearances and national championship performances.

Since 1991, Ehrnlund and her husband Erik, also a golf professional, runs their own 9-hole golf course, Bollestad Golf Club, between Marstrand and Kungälv, Sweden, but none of their two children, Victor and Amanda, became golf professionals. Until 2019, Ehrnlund also ran a shop at Göteborg Landvetter Airport. Since her retirement after the 1985 season she did not play an 18-hole round of golf for 13 years and then waited another 21 years.

== Amateur wins ==
- 1977 Swedish Match-play Championship
- 1978 Swedish Junior Stroke-play Championship, Swedish Match-play Championship, Swedish International Stroke-play Championship, German Open Amateur Championship, Austrian Open Amateur Championship

== Professional wins (2) ==
=== Ladies European Tour (2) ===
| No. | Date | Tournament | Winning score | Margin of victory | Runner(s)-up |
|---|---|---|---|---|---|
| 1 | 28 Aug 1980 | McEwan's Lager Welsh Classic | −2 (68-74=142)* | 2 strokes | (England) Jane Chapman |
| 2 | 5 Aug 1984 | United Friendly Tournament | −4 (75-72-72-69=288) | 4 strokes | (England) Jane Forrest, (Scotland) Dale Reid |

*Note: The 1980 McEwan's Lager Welsh Classic was shortened from 54 to 36 holes due to rain.

== Team appearances ==
Amateur

- Espirito Santo Trophy (representing Sweden): 1978
