= Catherine Panton-Lewis =

Scottish professional golfer (born 1955)

Personal information
- Full name: Catherine Rita Panton-Lewis
- Nationality: Scotland
- Born: 14 June 1955 (age 71) Bridge of Allan, Scotland

Career
- Sport: Golf
- College: University of Edinburgh; Thames Valley University
- Turned professional: 1978
- Former tours: Ladies European Tour (1979–1995); LPGA Tour (1983–1985)
- Professional wins: 14

Number of wins by tour
- Ladies European Tour: 14 (7th all-time)

Best results in LPGA major championships
- Chevron Championship: DNP
- Women's PGA C'ship: DNP
- U.S. Women's Open: CUT: 1984
- du Maurier Classic: T21: 1983

Achievements and awards
- Ladies European Tour Order of Merit: 1979

Catherine Rita Panton-Lewis (born 14 June 1955) is a Scottish professional golfer who was a founding member of the Ladies European Tour and won its first Order of Merit. Her father was John Panton, MBE, a professional golfer who played on three Ryder Cup teams.

== Early life and amateur career ==
Panton was born in Bridge of Allan, Scotland in 1955

As an amateur, she won the British Ladies Amateur in 1976, winning 1-up over Alison Sheard. Later that year, she was a member of the Great Britain & Ireland Espirito Santo Trophy team. She was captain of the University of Edinburgh golf team in 1976 and 1977 and was Scottish Universities Champion in 1977.

== Professional career ==
In 1978, Panton turned professional the same year that the Women's Professional Golf Association was founded (as a division of the PGA of Great Britain and Ireland). In 1979, she participated in the first season of the Women's Professional Golf Association's tour (later the Ladies European Tour) and topped the tour's first Order of Merit. She went on to win 14 tournaments on the tour, and also played on the LPGA Tour in the mid-1980s.

She played her last full season on the LET in 1995, and has played in some events on the Legends Tour, including the inaugural Handa Cup in 2006.

== Awards and honors ==
- In 1976, Panton was named Scottish Sportswoman of the Year.
- In 1979, she led the Ladies European Tour Order of Merit.

== Professional wins (14) ==
=== Ladies European Tour wins (14) ===
- 1979 (2) Carlsberg Championship – Willingdon, State Express Tournament
- 1980 (1) Elizabeth Ann Classic
- 1981 (2) Carlsberg Championship – Queen's Park, Carlsberg Championship – Moortown
- 1982 (1) Moben Kitchens Classic
- 1983 (3) Smirnoff Ladies Irish Open, UBM Northern Classic, Dunham Forest Pro-Am
- 1985 (2) McEwan's Wirral Caldy Classic, Delsjö Ladies Open
- 1986 (1) Portuguese Ladies Open
- 1987 (1) Portuguese Ladies Open
- 1988 (1) Bowring Ladies Scottish Open

== Team appearances ==
Amateur

- Espirito Santo Trophy (representing Great Britain & Ireland): 1976
- Vagliano Trophy (representing Great Britain & Ireland): 1977 (winners)
- European Ladies' Team Championship (representing Scotland): 1973, 1977
- Women's Home Internationals (representing Scotland): 1972, 1973, 1976, 1977, 1978

Professional

- Handa Cup (representing World team): 2006

== See also ==
- List of golfers with most Ladies European Tour wins
