= Kitrina Douglas =

English professional golfer (born 1960)

Personal information
- Nationality: England
- Born: 6 September 1960 (age 66)

Career
- Sport: Golf
- Turned professional: 1984
- Former tour: Ladies European Tour
- Professional wins: 8

Number of wins by tour
- Ladies European Tour: 8

Best results in LPGA major championships
- Chevron Championship: CUT: 1985, 1990
- Women's PGA C'ship: DNP
- U.S. Women's Open: DNP
- du Maurier Classic: DNP

Achievements and awards
- Ladies European Tour Rookie of the Year: 1984

Kitrina Douglas (born 6 September 1960) is an English professional golfer. She played on the Ladies European Tour from 1984 to 1996.

== Career ==
In 1982, Douglas won the British Ladies Amateur and played on the Great Britain & Ireland Curtis Cup team. She played professionally on the Ladies European Tour where she won eight times and was a member of the winning 1992 European Solheim Cup team.

Douglas started working for the BBC Radio Five Live and covered The Open Championship, PGA Championship, and Ryder Cup, later she also became a BBC Sport Online golf columnist.

In 1996, Douglas left the Ladies European Tour and began a BSc (Hons) in Exercise and Sport Science at the University of Exeter, following this completed a PhD studying Women's Motivation in Sport. In 2004, Douglas was awarded a Doctor of Philosophy (PhD) in Psychology from the University of Bristol.

She continues to carry out research within and outside of sport and over the past 20 years has carried out research for a variety of organisations including Department of Health, Addiction Recovery Agency, Royal British Legion, Women's Sports Foundation, UK Sport, local authority, and NHS Primary Mental Health Care Trusts. Her research is published in peer-reviewed journals and she has also co-authored three academic books: Sport and Physical Activity for Mental Health; Life Story Research in Sport; and Autoethnography, Pedagogy & Practice. One of the main issues covered in Douglas's recent research is how to make research more accessible to the public and, alongside this, how to include in findings things that are difficult to talk about. To this end she has written songs, poems, and performance from her research, a selection of which can be found on YouTube.

She is now a professor of Narrative and Performative Research at the University of West London.

== Awards and honors ==
In 1984, she earned Rookie of the Year honors on the Ladies European Tour.

== Professional wins (8) ==
=== Ladies European Tour wins (8) ===
- 1984 (2) Ford Ladies' Classic, Höganäs Sweden Open
- 1986 (1) Mitsubishi Colt Cars Jersey Open
- 1987 (1) Hennessy Cognac Ladies Cup
- 1989 (2) St Moritz Classic, Godiva European Masters
- 1991 (1) Ladies English Open
- 1992 (1) BMW European Masters

== Team appearances ==
Amateur

- European Lady Junior's Team Championship (representing England): 1982 (winners)
- Curtis Cup (representing Great Britain & Ireland): 1982
- Vagliano Trophy (representing Great Britain & Ireland): 1983 (winners)
- European Ladies' Team Championship (representing England): 1983

Professional

- Solheim Cup (representing Europe): 1992 (winners)
