= Susan Moon =

American author and editor (born 1942)

Susan Moon is an American writer and editor. She wrote The Life and Letters of Tofu Roshi, as well as This Is Getting Old: Zen Thoughts on Aging with Humor and Dignity. In 1993 she was awarded a Creative Writing fellowship by the National Endowment for the Arts. She was published in the "The Pushcart prize, XVII : best of the small presses, 1992-1993"- published in 1993, with the short story "Bodies". She has also been a residency fellow in various fellowships. She studies Zen, since 1976.
