= Muriel Thomson =

Scottish professional golfer

Personal information
- Full name: Muriel Natalie Thomson
- Nationality: Scottish
- Born: 12 December 1954 (age 71) Aberdeen, Scotland

Career
- Sport: Golf
- Turned professional: 1979
- Former tour: Ladies European Tour

Number of wins by tour
- Ladies European Tour: 9

Achievements and awards
- Ladies European Tour Order of Merit: 1980, 1983
- Toby Sunderland Award: 2006

Muriel Natalie Thomson (born 12 December 1954) is a retired Scottish professional golfer. Thomson was an amateur golfer in Scotland before playing on the Ladies European Tour from 1979 to 1989. During her time on the tour, she won the Order of Merit title in 1980 and 1983 while winning nine tournaments overall. In team events, Thomson was part of the team that won the 1977 Vagliano Trophy and played at the 1978 Curtis Cup.

== Early life and education ==
On 12 December 1954, Thomson was born in Aberdeen, Scotland. She began golfing at the age of eight years old.

== Career ==
Thomson worked in banking while she was an amateur golfer. In Scotland, she won the North of Scotland championship from 1973 to 1974 and the Helen Holm championship from 1975 to 1976. She was also runner-up in the 1977 Scottish Women's Amateur Championship. After leaving banking to become a professional golfer in 1979, Thomson joined the Women's Professional Golf Association, now known as the Ladies European Tour.

Thompson's first win in the Ladies European Tour was in 1980 at the Carlsberg European Championship event at Tyrells Wood. During her professional career, Thompson won nine tournaments on the Ladies European Tour, with her last two wins at the Ford Ladies' Classic and Ladies Irish Open in 1986. Thompson also won the Ladies European Tour Order of Merit title in 1980 and 1983. As part of the Great Britain and Ireland team, Thomson won the 1977 Vagliano Trophy and participated in the 1978 Curtis Cup.

Upon ending her golfing career in 1989, Thomson began her teaching career at Deeside Golf Club before moving to Portlethen Golf Club in 1990. She remained at Portlethen until her retirement in 2015. Apart from teaching, Thomson began volunteering for St Joseph Social Service Centre at Chennai, India in 2006. As a bicycle rider, Thomson completed a 2016 trip that started in Land's End and finished in John o' Groats. She has also traveled on a bicycle to overseas countries including South Africa, Thailand and Mongolia.

== Amateur wins ==
- 1973 North of Scotland
- 1974 North of Scotland
- 1976 Helen Holm Scottish Women's Open Stroke Play Championship
- 1977 Helen Holm Scottish Women's Open Stroke Play Championship
- 1978 Canadian Foursomes

== Professional wins ==
=== Ladies European Tour wins (9) ===
- 1980 Carlsberg Championship – Tyrrells Wood, Viscount Double Glazing Championship, Barnham Broom Championship
- 1981 Elizabeth Ann Classic
- 1984 Guernsey Open, Sands International
- 1985 Laing Ladies Classic
- 1986 Ford Ladies Classic, British Midland Ladies Irish Open

== Awards and honours ==
In 2006, Thomson was awarded the Toby Sunderland Award.

== Team appearances ==
Amateur

- European Ladies' Team Championship (representing (Scotland): 1975, 1977
- Vagliano Trophy (representing Great Britain & Ireland): 1977
- Curtis Cup (representing Great Britain & Ireland): 1978
- Espirito Santo Trophy (representing Great Britain & Ireland): 1978
