= Mickey Walker (golfer) =

English professional golfer (born 1952)

Mickey Walker OBE
Personal information
- Full name: Carol Michelle Walker
- Nationality: England
- Born: 17 December 1952 (age 73) Leeds, England

Career
- Sport: Golf
- Turned professional: 1973
- Former tours: Ladies European Tour (1979–1992); LPGA Tour (1974–1981)
- Professional wins: 6

Number of wins by tour
- Ladies European Tour: 6

Best results in LPGA major championships
- Chevron Championship: DNP
- Women's PGA C'ship: T26: 1977
- U.S. Women's Open: T28: 1977
- du Maurier Classic: DNP

Carol Michelle Walker OBE (born 17 December 1952) is an English professional golfer.

== Career ==
In 1952, Walker was born in Leeds, Yorkshire, England. She won the Hovis International in 1972.

In 1973, Walker turned professional. She played on the U.S.-based LPGA Tour from 1974 to 1981. Her best finish was a T-2 at the 1976 Jerry Lewis Muscular Dystrophy Classic where she lost a four-player playoff to Sandra Palmer.

Walker was a founding member of the Ladies European Tour and won six times on the tour between 1979 and 1984.

Walker was Europe's Solheim Cup captain the first four times the Cup was held (1990, 1992, 1994 and 1996), captaining Europe to its first victory in the competition in 1992. She coached the Great Britain & Ireland Curtis Cup team in 1994, 1996 and 1998. She has been appointed captain of the 2019 European team for the Junior Solheim Cup at Gleneagles.

Walker was head professional at the Warren Golf Club in Essex from 1986 to 2001.

She works as a golf coach, radio and television commentator and public speaker.

== Awards and honors ==
In the 1993 Birthday Honours, she was appointed an Officer of the Order of the British Empire (OBE) for services to Women's Golf.

== Professional wins (6) ==
=== Ladies European Tour wins (6) ===
- 1979 Carlsberg Championship – York
- 1980 Lambert & Butler Matchplay
- 1981 Carlsberg Championship – St Pierre
- 1983 Sands International
- 1984 Baume & Mercier International, Lorne Stewart Matchplay Championship

== Team appearances ==
Amateur

- European Ladies' Team Championship (representing England): 1971 (winners), 1973 (winners)
- Vagliano Trophy (representing Great Britain & Ireland): 1971 (winners)
- Curtis Cup (representing Great Britain & Ireland): 1972
- Commonwealth Trophy (representing Great Britain): 1971 (winners)
