= Jenny Lee Smith =

English professional golfer (born 1948)

Personal information
- Full name: Jennifer Constance Lee Smith
- Nationality: England
- Born: 2 December 1948 (age 77) Newcastle upon Tyne, England

Career
- Sport: Golf
- Turned professional: 1977
- Former tours: Ladies European Tour; LPGA Tour (1978–1984)
- Professional wins: 12

Number of wins by tour
- Ladies European Tour: 10

Best results in LPGA major championships
- Chevron Championship: DNP
- Women's PGA C'ship: CUT: 1978
- U.S. Women's Open: DNP
- du Maurier Classic: DNP

Achievements and awards
- Ladies European Tour Order of Merit: 1981, 1982

Jennifer Constance Lee Smith (born 2 December 1948) is an English professional golfer. She is known for winning the inaugural Women's British Open in 1976. She later won the Order of Merit on the Women's Professional Golf Association Tour (now Ladies European Tour) twice: in 1981 and 1982. She now goes by the name Jenny Lucas.

== Early life ==
In 1948, Lee-Smith was born in Newcastle upon Tyne, England. She was raised in the town. Lee-Smith started playing golf at a relatively young age.

== Amateur career ==
After some success in regional tournaments in the late 1960s and early 1970s, she began to play in international tournaments. Lee-Smith was a member of the Great Britain Curtis Cup team in both 1974 and 1976, represented England in the 1975 European Team Championships, and played for Great Britain & Ireland in the 1976 Espirito Santo Trophy.

In 1976, while still an amateur, Lee-Smith won the inaugural Ladies' British Open (now the Women's British Open). There were only a handful of professional women golfers in the United Kingdom at the time, and the field was mostly made up of amateurs. At the end of the year, she was voted Daks Woman Golfer of the Year along with Tegwen Perkins.

== Professional career ==
In 1977, Lee-Smith turned professional. She qualified for the LPGA Tour that year.

In 1978, the Women's Professional Golf Association and Lee-Smith joined the tour for its first year in 1979. She finished 8th on the money list that year, third in 1980, and won the Order of Merit as the leading money winner in both 1981 and 1982. She was voted the 1982 North East Sports Personality Of The Year.

== Personal life ==
Lee-Smith now resides in Tenterden, Kent, England, with her family. She has three children (Katie, Josh, and Ben) and is married to Sam Lucas.

In 2012, Lee-Smith discovered that she had a twin sister living in Northumberland. Together they co-authored a book My Secret Sister about their experience under her married name of Jenny Lucas with Helen Edwards.

== Awards and honors ==
- In 1976, she won the Daks Woman Golfer of the Year award.
- In 1981 and 1982, she led the Order of Merit on the Ladies European Tour.
- In 1982, Lee-Smith was voted the North East Sports Personality Of The Year.

== Amateur wins ==
- 1974 Wills Women's International Match Play
- 1976 Newmark International

== Professional wins (12) ==
=== Ladies European Tour wins (10) ===
- 1979 Carlsberg Championship – Arcot Hall
- 1980 Volvo International Tournament, Carlsberg Championship – Shifnal, Robert Winsor Productions Championship, Manchester Evening News Pro-Am Classic
- 1981 Sposts Space Championship, McEwan's Lager Welsh Classic, Lambert & Butler Matchplay
- 1982 Ford Ladies Classic
- 1984 British Olivetti Tournament

=== Other wins (2) ===
- 1974 Wills International Matchplay Tournament
- 1976 Women's British Open (as an amateur)

== Team appearances ==
Amateur

- Curtis Cup (representing Great Britain & Ireland): 1974, 1976
- Espirito Santo Trophy (representing Great Britain & Ireland): 1976
- Commonwealth Trophy (representing Great Britain): 1975 (winners)
- European Ladies' Team Championship (representing England): 1975
- Women's Home Internationals (representing England): 1973 (winners), 1974, 1975 (winners), 1976 (winners)
