= Ladies European Tour =

Professional golf tour for women

- Current season, competition or edition: 2026 Ladies European Tour
- Sport: Golf
- Founded: 1978
- CEO: Alexandra Armas
- Countries: Based in Europe. Schedule includes events outside Europe, in Oceania, Asia, Africa, and the United States.
- Most titles: (England) Laura Davies (45)
- Related competitions: European Tour; LPGA Tour; LET Access Series
- Website: http://ladieseuropeantour.com

The Ladies European Tour is a professional golf tour for women which was founded in 1978. Most of the players on the tour are European, with members from more than 40 countries internationally. Despite its name, the tour also has tournaments in Africa, Asia, North America and Oceania.

The organization is based at Buckinghamshire Golf Club near London in England. Like many British-based sports organisations it is a company limited by guarantee, a legal structure which enables it to focus on maximising returns to its members through prize money, rather than on making profits for investors. The tour is run by a board of directors and a Players' Council.

== History ==
The U.S.-based LPGA was founded in 1950, but women's professional golf was slower to get established in Europe. In 1978 the Women's Professional Golfers' Association (WPGA) was formed as part of Professional Golfers' Association of Great Britain and Ireland. A tour was established the following year with Carlsberg as the main sponsor, supporting 12 36-hole tournaments, with several other tournaments including the Women's British Open on the schedule. For the first two seasons, the majority of tournaments were held over 36-holes; in 1981, that increased to 54-holes. Total prize money on the tour was planned to rise to £250,000 in 1981, from £80,000 in the inaugural season, but several tournaments and pro-ams were lost after sponsors withdrew.

Carlsberg ended their sponsorship after the 1981 season, and despite initial optimism, the tour experienced further problems during its fourth season in 1982 as several more events were cancelled. The circuit was left with just ten tournaments, from which few players could make a living, and the future of the WPGA was being questioned.

In 1988 the tour members decided to form an independent company, the Women Professional Golfers' European Tour Limited. This new company moved away from the PGA's headquarters at The Belfry and set up its own headquarters at the Tytherington Club in Cheshire. In 1998 the Tour changed its name to European Ladies' Professional Golf Association Limited and again in July 2000 to Ladies European Tour Limited. In 2008 the tour relocated to offices at the Buckinghamshire Golf Club, which is just outside London. In 2010, the LET Access Series (LETAS) was launched as the official development tour.

In January 2020, the Ladies European Tour entered into a joint venture arrangement with the LPGA Tour, with the stated aim of "increasing playing opportunities for female golfers in Europe". The board of directors of Ladies European Golf Venture Limited, which assumed control of the tour, includes high level representatives from the LPGA Tour, European Tour, and The R&A. The 2020 season is the first edition of the Race to Costa Del Sol.

The 2025 season consisted of 30 events across 20 countries with a minimum prize fund of €39m. In 2026 the number of nationalities represented on the LET was 47.

== Tournaments ==
Unlike in men's golf, the European and American tours do not share a common set of majors, although the Women's British Open and The Evian Championship are currently recognised as majors by both organisations.

The Ladies European Tour organises the Solheim Cup when in Europe and in 2011, the Tour received a boost when the European side won for The Cup for the fourth time on home soil at Killeen Castle in Ireland. The success continued when Europe earned an historic first away victory at Colorado Golf Club, winning The Cup for the fifth time in 2013.

A record 26 official money events were scheduled for the 2008 season, which also saw the introduction of a new team competition called the European Ladies Golf Cup. Also, for the first time in several years, the LET scheduled an event opposite one of the LPGA's majors, with the ABN AMRO Open held opposite the LPGA Championship. The schedule dropped to 23 official money events in 2009, but increased to 25 for 2010. In both years, the Ladies Open of Portugal was scheduled opposite the LPGA Championship.

The 2016 schedule featured 21 events including the Olympic Golf Competition in Rio de Janeiro (the biennial Solheim Cup, held in odd-numbered years, is also an official LET event but will next be played in 2017 in Iowa). The two richest events by far are the two European Majors: The Evian Championship (historically the Evian Masters) and the Women's British Open. In 2016, 10 other events (in Australia, China, Morocco, England, Scotland, Germany, Abu Dhabi, Qatar, Japan and Dubai) had prize funds in excess of €450,000, with the remainder having prize funds of between €200,000 and €400,000. Total prize money from the 2016 events passed €14 million.

== Past tour schedules ==
Individual LET tournaments may have purses fixed in local currencies such as Australian dollars, British pounds, New Zealand dollars and U.S. dollars, so year on year changes in the total prize fund reflect exchange rate fluctuations as well as prize fund movements in constant currencies.

Year	Ranking tournaments	Countries (Note: Individual events counting towards the Order of Merit only. England, Scotland, Wales, Northern Ireland and Guernsey counted separately.)	Total purse (Note: Individual events counting towards the Order of Merit only. Excludes team events and qualifying school.)
2026	29	21	€38,529,425
2025	28	21	€37,107,960
2024	28	21	€33,234,465
2023	29	21	€32,403,796
2022	34	22	€28,830,707
2021	23	15	€17,397,397
2020	24	18	€17,834,000
2019	20	13	€13,127,117
2018	15	9	€11,486,888
2017	16	11	€10,397,831
2016	21	15	€14,063,149
2015	20	14	€12,638,013
2014	23	18	€11,502,840
2013	22	17	€10,870,618
2012	24	19	€11,806,680
2011	25	20	€11,032,500
2010	25	21	€11,048,525
2009	21	16	€9,940,358
2008	28	21	€11,647,814
2007	24	18	€10,563,950
2006	20	16	€9,674,536
2005	18	14	€7,875,255
2004	15	10	€7,298,245
2003	14	10	€7,442,162
2002	14	10	€7,626,724
2001	15	12	£4,509,905
2000	16	11	£3,765,000
1999	15	10	£3,197.999
1998	11	9	£2,374,000
1997	15	10	£2,880,000
1996	18	13	£2,589,790
1995	18	14	£2,300,060
1994	15	12	£1,852,550
1993	11		£1,435,336
1992	14		£1,663,716
1991	16		£1,605,875
1990	20		£1,900,325
1989	21		£1,600,000
1988	27		£1,565,622
1987	19		£930,000
1986	20		£750,000
1985	20		£580,000
1984	21		£347,470
1983	16		£170,050
1982	10	6	£121,450
1981	13	5	£125,830
1980	21	5	£110,494
1979	18	5	£80,000

== Order of Merit and seasonal award winners ==
The Order of Merit is awarded to the leading money winner on the tour, though for some years in the past a points system was used. The Player's Player of the Year award is voted by the members of the Tour for the member they believe has contributed the most to the season on the Tour. The Rookie of the Year (known as the Bill Johnson Trophy from 1999 to 2003 and now the Ryder Cup Wales Rookie of the Year) is awarded to the leading first-year player on the Order of Merit rankings.

Year	Order of Merit		Player of the Year	Rookie of the Year	Lowest stroke average		Ref.
2025	(Singapore) Shannon Tan	2461.74 pts	(Singapore) Shannon Tan	(England) Mimi Rhodes	(South Africa) Casandra Alexander	70.42	
2024	(Switzerland) Chiara Tamburlini	2718.44 pts	(Switzerland) Chiara Tamburlini	(Switzerland) Chiara Tamburlini	(Germany) Helen Briem	69.19	
2023	(Thailand) Trichat Cheenglab	1966.52 pts	(Sweden) Johanna Gustavsson	(Thailand) Trichat Cheenglab	(France) Céline Boutier	69.58	
2022	(Sweden) Linn Grant	3624.91 pts	(Sweden) Linn Grant	(Sweden) Linn Grant	(Sweden) Maja Stark	69.27	
2021	(Thailand) Atthaya Thitikul	3591.96 pts	(Thailand) Atthaya Thitikul	(Thailand) Atthaya Thitikul	(Republic of Ireland) Leona Maguire	69.50	
2020	(Denmark) Emily Kristine Pedersen	1249.35 pts	(Denmark) Emily Kristine Pedersen	(Australia) Stephanie Kyriacou	(Denmark) Emily Kristine Pedersen	70.40	
2019	(Germany) Esther Henseleit	743.06 pts	(Norway) Marianne Skarpnord	(Germany) Esther Henseleit	(Spain) Carlota Ciganda	69.08	
2018	(England) Georgia Hall	667.73 pts	(England) Georgia Hall	(Sweden) Julia Engström	(Spain) Carlota Ciganda	69.31	
2017	(England) Georgia Hall	€368,935	(England) Georgia Hall	(France) Camille Chevalier	(Sweden) Anna Nordqvist	68.18	
2016	(United States) Beth Allen	€313,079	(United States) Beth Allen	(India) Aditi Ashok	(China) Shanshan Feng	68.80	
2015	(China) Shanshan Feng	€399,213	(Denmark) Nicole Broch Larsen	(Denmark) Emily Kristine Pedersen	(China) Shanshan Feng	69.78	
2014	(England) Charley Hull	€263,097	(England) Charley Hull	(Wales) Amy Boulden	(Norway) Suzann Pettersen	70.25	
2013	(Norway) Suzann Pettersen	€518,448	(South Africa) Lee-Anne Pace	(England) Charley Hull	(Norway) Suzann Pettersen	68.20	
2012	(Spain) Carlota Ciganda	€251,290	(Spain) Carlota Ciganda	(Spain) Carlota Ciganda	(China) Shanshan Feng	69.00	
2011	(Japan) Ai Miyazato	€363,080	(Sweden) Caroline Hedwall	(Sweden) Caroline Hedwall	(Norway) Suzann Pettersen	69.36	
2010	(South Africa) Lee-Anne Pace	€339,518	(South Africa) Lee-Anne Pace	(South Korea) I.K. Kim	(Norway) Suzann Pettersen	69.75	
2009	(Sweden) Sophie Gustafson	€281,315	(Scotland) Catriona Matthew	(Sweden) Anna Nordqvist	(Scotland) Catriona Matthew	70.83	
2008	(France) Gwladys Nocera	€391,840	(France) Gwladys Nocera	(England) Melissa Reid	(Norway) Suzann Pettersen	68.60	
2007	(Sweden) Sophie Gustafson	€222,081	(Germany) Bettina Hauert	(Sweden) Louise Stahle	(Sweden) Sophie Gustafson	70.96	
2006	(England) Laura Davies	€471,727	(France) Gwladys Nocera	(Australia) Nikki Garrett	(Sweden) Annika Sörenstam	68.33	
2005	(Denmark) Iben Tinning	€204,672	(Denmark) Iben Tinning	(Spain) Elisa Serramià	(England) Laura Davies	70.35	
2004	(England) Laura Davies	777.26 pts	(France) Stéphanie Arricau	(Finland) Minea Blomqvist	(England) Laura Davies	70.31	
2003	(Sweden) Sophie Gustafson	917.95 pts	(Sweden) Sophie Gustafson	(Australia) Rebecca Stevenson	(Sweden) Sophie Gustafson	69.93	
2002	(Spain) Paula Martí	6,589 pts	(Sweden) Annika Sörenstam	(England) Kirsty S. Taylor	(Sweden) Sophie Gustafson	70.59	
2001	(Spain) Raquel Carriedo	10,661 pts	(Spain) Raquel Carriedo	(Norway) Suzann Pettersen	(Scotland) Catriona Matthew	70.08	
2000	(Sweden) Sophie Gustafson	8,777 pts	(Sweden) Sophie Gustafson	(Italy) Giulia Sergas	(Sweden) Sophie Gustafson	71.21	
1999	(England) Laura Davies	£204,522	(England) Laura Davies	(England) Elaine Ratcliffe	(England) Laura Davies	70.50	
1998	(Sweden) Helen Alfredsson	£125,975	(Sweden) Sophie Gustafson	(United States) Laura Philo	(England) Laura Davies	71.96	
1997	(England) Alison Nicholas	£94,590	(England) Alison Nicholas	(Sweden) Anna Berg	(France) Marie-Laure de Lorenzi	72.20	
1996	(England) Laura Davies	£110,880	(England) Laura Davies	(Australia) Anne-Marie Knight	(France) Marie-Laure de Lorenzi	71.39	
1995	(Sweden) Annika Sörenstam	£130,324	(Sweden) Annika Sörenstam	(Australia) Karrie Webb	(Sweden) Annika Sörenstam	69.75	
1994	(Sweden) Liselotte Neumann	£102,750	n/a	(United States) Tracy Hanson	(Sweden) Liselotte Neumann	69.56	
1993	(Australia) Karen Lunn	£81,266	n/a	(Sweden) Annika Sörenstam	(England) Laura Davies	71.63	
1992	(England) Laura Davies	£66,333	n/a	(France) Sandrine Mendiburu	(England) Laura Davies	70.35	
1991	(Australia) Corinne Dibnah	£89,058	n/a	(Wales) Helen Wadsworth	(England) Alison Nicholas	71.71	
1990	(England) Trish Johnson	£83,043	n/a	(United States) Pearl Sinn	(England) Trish Johnson	70.64	
1989	(France) Marie-Laure de Lorenzi	£77,534	n/a	(Sweden) Helen Alfredsson	(France) Marie-Laure de Lorenzi	70.84	
1988	(France) Marie-Laure de Lorenzi	£109,360	n/a	(South Africa) Laurette Maritz	(France) Marie-Laure de Lorenzi	72.30	
1987	(Scotland) Dale Reid	£53,815	n/a	(England) Trish Johnson	(Scotland) Dale Reid	72.70	
1986	(England) Laura Davies	£37,500	n/a	(Spain) Patricia González	(England) Laura Davies	72.09	
1985	(England) Laura Davies	£21,735	n/a	(England) Laura Davies			
1984	(Scotland) Dale Reid	£28,239	n/a	(England) Kitrina Douglas	(Scotland) Dale Reid	73.01	
1983	(Scotland) Muriel Thomson	£9,225	n/a	n/a	(England) Beverly Huke	74.98	
1982	(England) Jenny Lee Smith	£12,551	n/a	n/a	n/a		
1981	(England) Jenny Lee Smith	£13,518	n/a	n/a	n/a		
1980	(Scotland) Muriel Thomson	£8,008	n/a	n/a	n/a		
1979	(Scotland) Catherine Panton	£4,965	n/a	n/a	n/a		

== See also ==
- Women's sports
- List of golfers with most Ladies European Tour wins
- Ladies European Tour records
- Women's World Golf Rankings
