= Frances Bondad =

Australian professional golfer (born 1988)

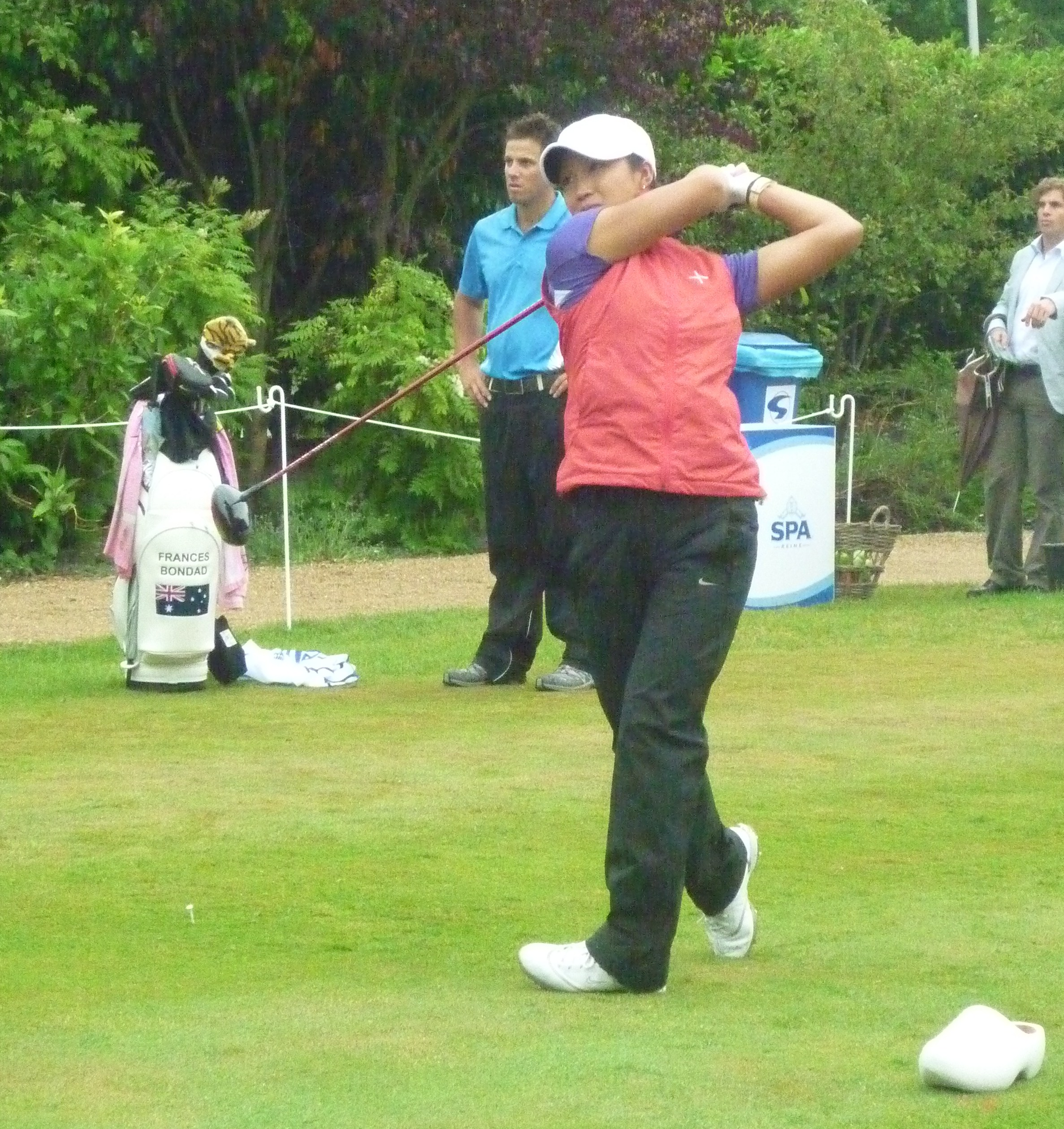
- Bondad in 2011

Personal information
- Full name: Frances Bondad-Head
- Nationality: Australia
- Born: 21 January 1988 (age 38) Los Angeles, California, U.S.
- Height: 163 cm (5 ft 4 in)

Career
- Sport: Golf
- College: Deakin University
- Turned professional: 2007
- Former tours: LET (2008–2012); LPGA Tour (2013); ALPG Tour (2007–2014)
- Professional wins: 1

Number of wins by tour
- Ladies European Tour: 1
- Ladies Asian Golf Tour: 1

Best results in LPGA major championships
- Chevron Championship: DNP
- Women's PGA C'ship: DNP
- U.S. Women's Open: DNP
- Women's British Open: CUT: 2010, 2011

Frances Bondad (born 21 January 1988) is an Australian retired professional golfer from Greystanes, Sydney. Frances played on the Ladies European Tour from 2008 to 2012. She won the 2011 Sanya Ladies Open in China.

== Amateur career ==
Bondad was born in Los Angeles, California, and started playing golf at age 10 inspired by her father. Although she represents Australia, she is proud of her Filipina heritage. Frances was the number one ranked amateur in Australia 2006–2007 after winning the 2007 Australian Women's Amateur Stroke Play Championship.

She represented Australia at the 2006 Espirito Santo Trophy together with Emma Bennett and Kate Combes.

== Professional career ==
Bondad won the third card at the 2007 LET Qualifying School and was a rookie on the 2008 Ladies European Tour, where her best results were T16 at the Open de España Femenino and T17 at the Göteborg Masters. She was also runner-up at the Thailand Ladies Open on the Ladies Asian Golf Tour, two strokes behind home player Pornanong Phatlum. In 2009 she recorded four top-10 finishes, including T10 at the AIB Ladies Irish Open and T5 at the Suzhou Taihu Ladies Open in China. She earned her first major start at the 2010 Women's British Open at Royal Birkdale.

She finished 27th in the 2010 LET Order of Merit after recording a T4 at the Deutsche Bank Ladies Swiss Open and a runner-up finish at the Open de España Femenino, two strokes behind Laura Davies. In 2011 she earned her maiden professional victory at the Sanya Ladies Open, one stroke ahead of Vikki Laing. She won a BMW 640i convertible valued at €102,500 when she made a hole-in-one at the 16th in the final round of the 2011 Deloitte Ladies Open.

Bondad was runner-up at the 2012 Ladies Scottish Open, one stroke behind home player Carly Booth. Following the 2012 LPGA Final Qualifying Tournament she joined the LPGA Tour in 2013 with conditional status.

In January 2014 she finished T6 at the Mount Broughton Classic on the ALPG Tour, five strokes behind winner Daniela Holmqvist, and after the New Zealand Women's Open in February she retired from tour.

== Amateur wins ==
- 2004 Philippine Ladies Amateur
- 2005 Hong Kong Ladies Amateur
- 2007 Australian Women's Amateur Stroke Play Championship

== Professional wins (1) ==
=== Ladies European Tour (1) ===
No.	Date	Tournament	Winning score	To par	Margin of victory	Runner(s)-up
1	23 Oct 2011^	Sanya Ladies Open	68-70-67=205	−11	1 stroke	(Scotland) Vikki Laing

^Co-sanctioned with the Ladies Asian Golf Tour

=== Ladies Asian Golf Tour (1) ===
No.	Date	Tournament	Winning score	To par	Margin of victory	Runner(s)-up
1	23 Oct 2011^	Sanya Ladies Open	68-70-67=205	−11	1 stroke	(Scotland) Vikki Laing

^Co-sanctioned with the Ladies European Tour

== Team appearances ==
Amateur

- Espirito Santo Trophy (representing Australia): 2006
- Commonwealth Trophy (representing Australia): 2007
