= 2012 Ladies European Tour =

Professional women's golf tour

2012 Ladies European Tour season
- Duration: February 2012 – December 2012
- Number of official events: 24
- Most wins: 2 (tie): (Netherlands) Christel Boeljon (Spain) Carlota Ciganda (China) Shanshan Feng (Australia) Stacey Keating
- Order of Merit: (Spain) Carlota Ciganda
- Player of the Year: (Spain) Carlota Ciganda
- Rookie of the Year: (Spain) Carlota Ciganda
- Lowest stroke average: (China) Shanshan Feng

The 2012 Ladies European Tour was the 34th season of the Ladies European Tour (LET), a series of golf tournaments for elite female golfers from around the world, which took place from February through December 2013.

The tour featured 24 official money events. Carlota Ciganda, a rookie, won the Order of Merit. She was also named Player of the Year and Rookie of the Year.

== Changes for 2012 ==
The season was the first since 1983 not to include an event in the Nordic countries. The South African Women's Open was included for the first time, while the Ladies Open of Portugal was dropped from the schedule, having been a fixture since 2002. The Ladies British Masters, not played since 2001, was re-introduced, now with ISPS Handa as title sponsor.

The European Nations Cup was succeeded as team event by the World Ladies Championship.

== Schedule ==
The numbers in brackets after the winners' names indicate the career wins on the Ladies European Tour, including that event, and is only shown for members of the tour.

Key

Major championships
LET majors in **bold**
Regular events
Team championships

| Dates | Tournament | Host country | Winner | WWGR points | Purse (€) | Other tours (Note: ALPG − ALPG Tour, LAGT − Ladies Asian Golf Tour, LPGA − LPGA Tour.) | Notes |
|---|---|---|---|---|---|---|---|
| 5 Feb | Gold Coast RACV Australian Ladies Masters | Australia | (Netherlands) Christel Boeljon (2) | 15.5 | A$500,000 | ALPG | |
| 12 Feb | ISPS Handa Women's Australian Open | Australia | (United States) Jessica Korda (n/a) | 43 | $1,100,000 | ALPG, LPGA | |
| 19 Feb | ISPS Handa New Zealand Women's Open | New Zealand | (Australia) Lindsey Wright (n/a) | 16 | 200,000 | ALPG | |
| 4 Mar | World Ladies Championship | China | (China) Shanshan Feng (n/a) | 16 | $500,000 | | Individual event |
| 25 Mar | Lalla Meryem Cup | Morocco | (Australia) Karen Lunn (10) | 16 | 325,000 | | |
| 5 May | Aberdeen Asset Management Ladies Scottish Open | Scotland | (Scotland) Carly Booth (1) | 16 | £183,000 | | |
| 13 May | Turkish Airlines Ladies Open | Turkey | (Netherlands) Christel Boeljon (3) | 16 | 250,000 | | |
| 27 May | UniCredit Ladies German Open | Germany | (France) Anne-Lise Caudal (2) | 16 | 350,000 | | |
| 3 Jun | Deloitte Ladies Open | Netherlands | (Spain) Carlota Ciganda (1) | 15 | 250,000 | | |
| 10 Jun | Allianz Ladies Slovak Open | Slovakia | (Denmark) Line Vedel (1) | 15 | 225,000 | | |
| 17 Jun | Deutsche Bank Ladies Swiss Open | Switzerland | (Scotland) Carly Booth (2) | 15 | 525,000 | | |
| 24 Jun | Raiffeisenbank Prague Golf Masters | Czech Republic | (England) Melissa Reid (4) | 15 | 250,000 | | |
| 15 Jul | South African Women's Open | South Africa | (Germany) Caroline Masson (1) | 15 | 260,000 | | |
| 29 Jul | **Evian Masters** | France | (South Korea) **Inbee Park** (n/a) | 68 | $3,250,000 | LPGA | |
| 5 Aug | Ladies Irish Open | Ireland | (Scotland) Catriona Matthew (5) | 18.5 | 350,000 | | |
| 18 Aug | ISPS Handa Ladies British Masters | England | (Wales) Lydia Hall (1) | 15 | £300,000 | | |
| 9 Sep | UNIQA Ladies Golf Open | Austria | (Sweden) Caroline Hedwall (5) | 15 | 200,000 | | |
| 16 Sep | **Ricoh Women's British Open** | England | (South Korea) **Jiyai Shin** (n/a) | 100 | $2,500,000 | LPGA | |
| 23 Sep | Tenerife Open de España Femenino | Spain | (Australia) Stacey Keating (1) | 15 | 350,000 | | |
| 7 Oct | Lacoste Ladies Open de France | France | (Australia) Stacey Keating (2) | 15 | 250,000 | | |
| 28 Oct | China Suzhou Taihu Open | China | (Spain) Carlota Ciganda (2) | 15 | 350,000 | LAGT | |
| 4 Nov | Sanya Ladies Open | China | (France) Cassandra Kirkland (1) | 15 | 250,000 | LAGT | |
| 2 Dec | Hero Women's Indian Open | India | (Thailand) Pornanong Phatlum (1) | 15 | $300,000 | LAGT | |
| 8 Dec | Omega Dubai Ladies Masters | U.A.E. | (China) Shanshan Feng (n/a) | 18.5 | 500,000 | | |

=== Unofficial events ===
The following events appear on the schedule, but do not carry official money or Order of Merit ranking points.

| Date | Tournament | Host country | Winners | WWGR points | Purse | Other tours | Notes |
|---|---|---|---|---|---|---|---|
| 4 Mar | Mission Hills World Ladies Championship | China | (China) Shanshan Feng and Liying Ye | – | $100,000 | | Team event |

== Order of Merit rankings ==
| Rank | Player | Country | Earnings (€) |
|---|---|---|---|
| 1 | Carlota Ciganda | Spain | 251,290 |
| 2 | Caroline Masson | Germany | 241,831 |
| 3 | Shanshan Feng | China | 202,148 |
| 4 | Julieta Granada | Paraguay | 164,042 |
| 5 | Carly Booth | Scotland | 164,020 |
| 6 | Stacey Keating | Australia | 159,782 |
| 7 | Lee-Anne Pace | South Africa | 159,617 |
| 8 | Diana Luna | Italy | 150,477 |
| 9 | Laura Davies | England | 130,293 |
| 10 | Trish Johnson | England | 124,438 |

== Location of tournaments ==
Location of tournaments in Europe.
Major championship
National open
Regular event
Location of tournaments outside Europe.
National open
Regular event
Team event
