= Ladies Asian Golf Tour =

Women's golf tour

Ladies Asian Tour
- Formerly: Ladies Asia Golf Circuit (1983–2004); Ladies Asian Golf Tour (2005–2021)
- Sport: Golf
- Founded: 1983
- Country: Thailand; Singapore; Malaysia; Indonesia; India; Hong Kong; Taiwan; Japan; China; Philippines; Macau
- Headquarters: Hong Kong (former); Japan (former); Seoul, Republic of Korea
- Confederation: Asia-Pacific Golf Confederation; International Golf Federation
- Website: LAT

The Ladies Asian Tour is a women's professional golf tour established in 2022 and successor to the Ladies Asia Golf Circuit which ran 1983–2004 and the Ladies Asian Golf Tour which ran 2005–2021. The successive tours have been sanctioned by the Asia-Pacific Golf Confederation since its inception as an official Asian ladies' tour.

== Background ==
By 2005 there were five established women's professional tours in the world, of which two were in Asia, namely the LPGA of Japan Tour and the LPGA of Korea Tour. Japan and South Korea are two of the top three powers in women's professional golf, alongside the United States. The Ladies Asian Tour (LAT) is effectively a tour for the rest of Asia. This is comparable to the position in men's golf, where Japan has its own Japan Golf Tour and the rest of Asia has the Asian Tour. Most of the players on the tour come from Asia, but there are also representatives of various other parts of the world. Like the other major golf tours, LAGT has been a professional member of the International Golf Federation.

== History ==
=== Ladies Asia Golf Circuit ===
Between 1987–2003 the tour was known as the Kosaido Ladies Asia Golf Circuit as the main sponsor was the Kosaido Company of Japan, and prize money was in the range of $50,000–70,000. The company terminated its sponsorship due to the passing of its Chairman, Mr. Yoshiaki Sakurai in 2003.

=== Ladies Asian Golf Tour ===
In 2005 the tour was reorganized as the Ladies Asian Golf Tour by Koichi Kato, and the first event after the restart was the Phuket Thailand Ladies Masters, which was played on 15-17 December 2005 with a $100,000 purse. In 2006 there were five tournaments with combined prize money of US$410,000, and five again in 2007, with total prize money of US$590,000. Between 2011 and 2014 most of the touräs events were co-sanctioned tournaments organized by the Taiwan LPGA Tour. With the only remaining tournaments of the tour, the Hong Kong Ladies Open and Hero Women's Indian Open, cancelled for several seasons due to the COVID-19 pandemic, the tour's activity came to a halt.

=== Ladies Asian Tour ===
In 2022, the Asian Golf Leaders Forum (AGLF) established a new Ladies Asian Tour (LAT) Series, which kicked off in June with the 36th Korea Women's Open. The LAT Series, through the Asia Pacific Golf Platform (APGP), organized seven tournaments across the Asia Pacific region in 2023, with plans to expand to 10 events in 2024.

== Schedule and results – Kosaido Ladies Asia Golf Circuit (1987–2004) ==
Kosaido Ladies Asia Golf Circuit 1987–2004
Season	Tournament	Location	Winner
1987	Taiwan Ladies Open	Taiwan	(Chinese Taipei) Tu Ai-yu
1987	Indonesia Ladies Open	Indonesia	(Japan) Fusako Nagata
1987	Singapore Ladies Open	Singapore	(Sweden) Liselotte Neumann
1987	Thailand Ladies Open	Thailand	(England) Beverley New
1987	Malaysia Ladies Open	Malaysia	(Japan) Ikuyo Shiotani
1988	Indonesia Ladies Open	Indonesia	(Australia) Elizabeth Wilson
1988	Singapore Ladies Open	Singapore	(Australia) Elizabeth Wilson
1988	Thailand Ladies Open	Thailand	(Australia) Karen Lunn
1988	Malaysia Ladies Open	Malaysia	(England) Beverley New
1989	Thailand Ladies Open	Thailand	(England) Debbie Dowling
1989	Indonesia Ladies Open	Indonesia	(Sweden) Sofia Grönberg-Whitmore
1989	Malaysia Ladies Open	Malaysia	(Japan) Norimi Terasawa
1990	Singapore Ladies Open	Singapore	(Switzerland) Evelyn Orley
1990	Taiwan Ladies Open	Taiwan	(Chinese Taipei) Tu Ai-yu
1990	Indonesia Ladies Open	Indonesia	(United States) Leigh Ann Mills
1990	Malaysia Ladies Open	Malaysia	(Japan) Chieko Nishida
1990	Thailand Ladies Open	Thailand	(Australia) Corinne Dibnah
1991	Indonesia Ladies Open	Indonesia	(Chinese Taipei) Li Wen-Lin
1991	Singapore Ladies Open	Singapore	(Chinese Taipei) Li Wen-Lin
1991	Malaysia Ladies Open	Malaysia	(Japan) Chieko Nishida
1991	Thailand Ladies Open	Thailand	(Australia) Mardi Lunn
1991	Taiwan Ladies Open	Taiwan	(Chinese Taipei) Li Wen-Lin
1992	Taiwan Ladies Open	Taiwan	(Chinese Taipei) Tu Ai-yu
1992	Thailand Ladies Open	Thailand	(Japan) Hitomi Notsu
1992	Indonesia Ladies Open	Indonesia	(Japan) Yuka Irie
1992	Singapore Ladies Open	Singapore	(Spain) Tania Abitbol
1992	Malaysia Ladies Open	Malaysia	(England) Alison Nicholas
1993	Thailand Ladies Open	Thailand	(England) Laura Davies
1993	Indonesia Ladies Open	Indonesia	(United States) Kim Lasken
1993	Singapore Ladies Open	Singapore	(England) Janet Soulsby
1993	Malaysia Ladies Open	Malaysia	(England) Sally Prosser
1993	Taiwan Ladies Open	Taiwan	(Japan) Fusako Nagata
1994	Taiwan Ladies Open	Taiwan	(United States) Karen Weiss
1994	Indonesia Ladies Open	Indonesia	(United States) Tracy Hanson
1994	Malaysia Ladies Open	Malaysia	(South Korea) Won Jae-sook
1994	Thailand Ladies Open	Thailand	(England) Laura Davies
1995	Taiwan Ladies Open	Taiwan	(Chinese Taipei) Cheng Mei-Chu
1995	Indonesia Ladies Open	Indonesia	(England) Lisa Hackney
1995	Malaysia Ladies Open	Malaysia	(Australia) Corinne Dibnah
1995	Thailand Ladies Open	Thailand	(Canada) Liz Earley
1995	Singapore Ladies Open	Singapore	(Spain) Estefania Knuth
1996	Taiwan Ladies Open	Taiwan	(Japan) Shoko Asano
1996	Indonesia Ladies Open	Indonesia	(Australia) Corinne Dibnah
1996	Malaysia Ladies Open	Malaysia	(Australia) Corinne Dibnah
1996	Thailand Ladies Open	Thailand	(United States) Shelly Rule
1996	Singapore Ladies Open	Singapore	(England) Debbie Dowling
1997	Taiwan Ladies Open	Taiwan	(Chinese Taipei) Hung Ching Huei
1997	Indonesia Ladies Open	Indonesia	(Sweden) Pernilla Sterner
1997	Malaysia Ladies Open	Malaysia	(Sweden) Petra Rigby Jinglöv
1997	Thailand Ladies Open	Thailand	(Sweden) Sophie Gustafson
1997	Philippines Ladies Open	Philippines	(Sweden) Pernilla Sterner
1998	Indonesia Ladies Open	Indonesia	(England) Tina Fischer
1998	Malaysia Ladies Open	Malaysia	(France) Sandrine Mendiburu
1998	Thailand Ladies Open	Thailand	(Chinese Taipei) Yun-Jye Wei
1998	Philippines Ladies Open	Philippines	(France) Kristel Mourgue d'Algue
1998	Taiwan Ladies Open	Taiwan	(Wales) Helen Wadsworth
1999	Taiwan Ladies Open	Taiwan	(Chinese Taipei) Tu Ai-yu
1999	Indonesia Ladies Open	Indonesia	(South Korea) Park Hee Jung
1999	Malaysia Ladies Open	Malaysia	(England) Johanna Head
1999	Thailand Ladies Open	Thailand	(Chinese Taipei) Yu-Chuan Tai
1999	Philippines Ladies Open	Philippines	(South Korea) Chung Il-mi
2000	Taiwan Ladies Open	Taiwan	(Chinese Taipei) Yun-Jye Wei
2000	Indonesia Ladies Open	Indonesia	(South Korea) Kang Soo-yun
2000	Malaysia Ladies Open	Malaysia	(South Korea) Kang Soo-yun
2000	Thailand Ladies Open	Thailand	(South Korea) Kang Soo-yun
2001	Taiwan Ladies Open	Taiwan	(Chinese Taipei) Hsiu-Feng Tseng
2001	Indonesia Ladies Open	Indonesia	(Chinese Taipei) Yun-Jye Wei
2001	Malaysia Ladies Open	Malaysia	(Japan) Shiho Oyama
2001	Thailand Ladies Open	Thailand	(Thailand) Naree Wongluekiet
2002	Taiwan Ladies Open	Taiwan	(Chinese Taipei) Huang Yu Chen
2002	Indonesia Ladies Open	Indonesia	(Japan) Momoyo Yamazaki
2002	Malaysia Ladies Open	Malaysia	(Japan) Yuka Arita
2002	Thailand Ladies Open	Thailand	(United States) Nicole Jeray
2003	Taiwan Ladies Open	Taiwan	(Thailand) Russamee Gulyanamitta
2003	Indonesia Ladies Open	Indonesia	(Japan) Akane Takagi
2003	Malaysia Ladies Open	Malaysia	(India) Smriti Mehra
2003	Thailand Ladies Open	Thailand	(Japan) Atsuko Ueno
2004	TLPGA Open (Note: Co-sanctioned event with the Taiwan LPGA Tour)	Taiwan	(South Korea) Shin Hyun-ju
2004	GAROC Open	Taiwan	(Chinese Taipei) Tu Ai-yu

== Schedule and results – Ladies Asian Golf Tour (2005–2021) ==
Ladies Asian Golf Tour 2005–2021
Season	Dates	Tournament	Location	Winner	Main tour(s)
2005	Feb 3–5	Samsung Ladies Masters	Singapore	(South Korea) Song Bo-bae	KLPGA, LET
2005	Dec 15–17	Phuket Thailand Ladies Masters	Phuket	(Thailand) Nontaya Srisawang	
2006	Feb 8–10	Hong Kong Ladies Masters	Hong Kong	(Thailand) Pornanong Phatlum	
2006	Feb 22–24	Thailand Ladies Open	Chonburi	(South Korea) Park Hee-young	
2006	Mar 2–4	Malaysian Ladies Open	Miri	(South Korea) Eun-Hee Ji	
2006	Mar 15–17	Orient Zhuhai Open	Zhuhai	(South Korea) Kim Hae-jung	
2006	Mar 22–24	Macau LAGT Championship	Macau	(South Korea) Eun-Hee Ji	
2007	Jan 24–26	Macau Ladies Open	Macau	(United States) Natalie Tucker	
2007	Jan 31 – Feb 2	Hong Kong Ladies Masters	Hong Kong	(United States) Libby Smith	
2007	Mar 7–9	Thailand Ladies Open	Bangkok	(South Korea) Jiyai Shin	
2007	Mar 14–16	DLF Women's Indian Open	New Delhi	(Chinese Taipei) Yani Tseng	
2007	Mar 21–23	Asia Miles Binhai Ladies Open	Shanghai	(South Korea) Na Da-ye	KLPGA
2008	Feb 20–22	Thailand Ladies Open	Samutprakarn	(Thailand) Pornanong Phatlum	
2008	Mar 26–28	DLF Women's Indian Open	New Delhi	(Thailand) Pornanong Phatlum	
2008	Sep 11–13	Binhai Open	Shanghai	(South Korea) Seo Hee-kyung	KLPGA
2008	Oct 31 – Nov 2	Suzhou Taihu Ladies Open	Jiangsu	(Sweden) Annika Sörenstam	LET
2009	Feb 18–20	Thailand Ladies Open	Samutprakarn	(Thailand) Onnarin Sattayabanphot	
2009	Feb 25–27	DLF Women's Indian Open	New Delhi	(Thailand) Pornanong Phatlum	
2009	Oct 30 – Nov 1	Suzhou Taihu Ladies Open	Jiangsu	(South Korea) Suh Bo-mi	LET
2010	Feb 24–26	Thailand Ladies Open	Samutprakarn	(South Korea) Lee Jung-min	
2010	Mar 19–21	Ladies Indonesia Open	Bali	(South Korea) Solar Lee	
2010	Oct 22–24	Sanya Ladies Open	Hainan	(South Africa) Lee-Anne Pace	LET
2010	Oct 29–31	Suzhou Taihu Ladies Open	Jiangsu	(South Africa) Lee-Anne Pace	LET
2010	Nov 11–13	Hero Honda Women's Indian Open	New Delhi	(England) Laura Davies	LET
2011	Jan 6–8	TLPGA & Royal Open	Hsinchu	(South Korea) Lee Mi-rim	TLPGA
2011	Jan 14–16	Taifong Ladies Open	Changhua	(Chinese Taipei) Yani Tseng	TLPGA
2011	Jan 21–23	Hitachi Ladies Classic	Taoyuan	(Thailand) Pornanong Phatlum	TLPGA
2011	Feb 9–11	Thailand Ladies Open	Bangkok	(Thailand) Tanaporn Kongkiatkrai	
2011	Feb 24–26	Yumeya Dream Cup	Nagoya	(Japan) Sakura Yokomine	
2011	Sep 21–23	Swinging Skirts TLPGA Open	New Taipei	(Chinese Taipei) Hsieh Yu-ling	TLPGA
2011	Oct 21–23	Sanya Ladies Open	Hainan	(Australia) Frances Bondad	LET
2011	Oct 28–30	Suzhou Taihu Ladies Open	Jiangsu	(Chinese Taipei) Yani Tseng	LET
2011	Nov 9–11	Hero Women's Indian Open	New Delhi	(Sweden) Caroline Hedwall	LET
2012	Dec 30 – Jan 1	TLPGA & Royal Open	Hsinchu	(Chinese Taipei) Shih Huei-ju	TLPGA
2012	Jan 6–8	Hitachi Ladies Classic	Taoyuan	(Chinese Taipei) Teresa Lu	TLPGA
2012	Feb 8–10	Thailand Ladies Open	Bangkok	(Thailand) Nontaya Srisawang	
2012	Feb 23–24	Miyazaki Ladies Open	Miyazaki	(Japan) Mami Fukuda	
2012	Mar 23–25	Yumeya Dream Cup	Nagoya	(Chinese Taipei) Yu Pei-lin	
2012	Aug 8–10	Technology Cup	Hsinchu	(Thailand) Tiranun Yoopan	TLPGA
2012	Oct 5–7	Fubon Ladies Open	Linkou	(Chinese Taipei) Yao Hsuan-yu	TLPGA
2012	Oct 10–12	TLPGA South Taiwan Open	Kaohsiung	(Chinese Taipei) Lu Ya-huei	TLPGA
2012	Oct 18–20	Enjoy Jakarta Indonesia Ladies Open	Jakarta	(Thailand) Patcharajutar Kongkraphan	
2012	Oct 25–28	Suzhou Taihu Ladies Open	Jiangsu	(Spain) Carlota Ciganda	LET
2012	Nov 2–4	Sanya Ladies Open	Hainan	(France) Cassandra Kirkland	LET
2012	Nov 8–10	TLPGA Chinatrust Open	Linkou	(Thailand) Gulyanamitta Numa	TLPGA
2012	Nov 30 – Dec 2	Hero Women's Indian Open	New Delhi	(Thailand) Pornanong Phatlum	LET
2012	Dec 14–16	Taifong Ladies Open	Changhua	(Chinese Taipei) Teresa Lu	TLPGA
2013	Jan 11–13	TLPGA & Royal Open	Hsinchu	(Thailand) Titiya Plucksataporn	TLPGA
2013	Jan 18–20	Hitachi Ladies Classic	Linkou	(Thailand) Pornanong Phatlum	TLPGA
2013	Jan 24–26	Yeangder TLPGA Open	Linkou	(Chinese Taipei) Yao Hsuan-yu	TLPGA
2013	Apr 11–13	Yumeya Dream Cup	Nagoya	(Japan) Yumika Adachi	
2013	May 31–Jun 2	Technology Cup	Hsinchu	(Chinese Taipei) Huei-Ju Shih	TLPGA
2013	Jul 19–21	Chung Cheng Ladies Open	Linkou	(Chinese Taipei) Ssu-Chia Cheng	TLPGA
2013	Jul 24–26	Kenda Tires TLPGA Open	Linkou	(Malaysia) Ainil Abu Bakar	TLPGA
2013	Sep 19–21	CTBC Ladies Open	Taoyuan	(South Korea) Kim Do‐yeon	TLPGA
2013	Sep 27–29	Fubon Ladies Open	Linkou	(Chinese Taipei) Ssu-Chia Cheng	TLPGA
2013	Oct 25–27	Sanya Ladies Open	Hainan	(South Africa) Lee-Anne Pace	LET
2013	Nov 1–3	Suzhou Taihu Ladies Open	Jiangsu	(France) Gwladys Nocera	LET
2013	Nov 7–9	PTT Global Chemical Thailand Ladies Open	Bangkok	(Thailand) Sherman Santiwiwatthanaphong (a)	
2013	Nov 13–15	TLPGA South Taiwan Open	Kaohsiung	(Chinese Taipei) Ya‐Huei Lu	TLPGA
2013	Nov 28–30	Hero Women's Indian Open	New Delhi	(Thailand) Thidapa Suwannapura	LET
2014	Jan 10–12	Hitachi Ladies Classic	Taoyuan	(Thailand) Pornanong Phatlum	TLPGA
2014	Jan 17–19	TLPGA & Royal Open	Hsinchu	(Thailand) Nontaya Srisawang	TLPGA
2014	Jan 24–26	Taifong Ladies Open	Changhua	(Chinese Taipei) Yani Tseng	TLPGA
2014	May 21–23	Yeangder TLPGA Open	New Taipei	(Australia) Tamie Durdin	TLPGA
2014	May 28–30	Kenda Tires TLPGA Open	Taoyuan	(Chinese Taipei) Babe Liu	TLPGA
2014	Aug 6–8	Jing-Du Construction Charity Ladies Open	Linkou	(Chinese Taipei) Ssu-Chia Cheng	TLPGA
2014	Sep 23–25	Party Golfers Open	Taichung	(Thailand) Kanphanitnan Muangkhumsakul	TLPGA
2014	Nov 14–16	Sanya Ladies Open	Hainan	(China) Lin Xiyu	LET
2014	Dec 4–6	Hero Women's Indian Open	New Delhi	(France) Gwladys Nocera	LET
2015	Jun 5–7	Hong Kong Ladies Open	Hong Kong	(South Korea) Lee Jeong-hwa	
2015	Oct 23–25	Hero Women's Indian Open	New Delhi	(Denmark) Emily Kristine Pedersen	LET
2015	Nov 6–8	Sanya Ladies Open	Hainan	(China) Lin Xiyu	LET
2016	Jun 10–12	Hong Kong Ladies Open	Hong Kong	(Hong Kong) Tiffany Chan (a)	
2016	Oct 27–29	Sanya Ladies Open	Hainan	(Thailand) Supamas Sangchan	LET
2016	Nov 11–13	Hero Women's Indian Open	New Delhi	(India) Aditi Ashok	LET
2017	Jun 9–11	EFG Hong Kong Ladies Open	Hong Kong	(Thailand) Supamas Sangchan	
2017	Nov 10–12	Hero Women's Indian Open	New Delhi	(France) Camille Chevalier	LET, WGAI (Note: From 2017 LAGT were allocated ten entries in the Hero Women's Indian Open.)
2017	Nov 17–19	Sanya Ladies Open	Hainan	(France) Céline Boutier	LET
2018	May 11–13	EFG Hong Kong Ladies Open	Hong Kong	(Thailand) Saranporn Langkulgasettrin	
2018	Nov 18–21	Hero Women's Indian Open	New Delhi	(Wales) Becky Morgan	LET, WGAI
2019	May 10–12	EFG Hong Kong Ladies Open	Hong Kong	(China) Liu Yan	
2019	Oct 3–6	Hero Women's Indian Open	New Delhi	(Austria) Christine Wolf	LET, WGAI
2020	~~May 8–10~~	EFG Hong Kong Ladies Open	Hong Kong	Cancelled due to the COVID-19 pandemic	
2020	~~Oct 1–4~~	Hero Women's Indian Open	New Delhi	Cancelled due to the COVID-19 pandemic	LET, WGAI
2021		EFG Hong Kong Ladies Open	Hong Kong	Cancelled due to the COVID-19 pandemic	
2021	~~Sep 30 – Oct 3~~	Hero Women's Indian Open	New Delhi	Cancelled due to the COVID-19 pandemic	LET, WGAI

== Schedule and results – Ladies Asian Tour (2022–) ==
=== 2022 season ===
Dates	Tournament	Location	Winner(s)	Prize fund	WWGR	Main tour (Note: KLPGA − LPGA of Korea Tour; KDT − Korea Dream Tour; TLPGA − Taiwan LPGA Tour)	Ref
19 Jun	DB Group Korea Women's Open	South Korea	(South Korea) Lim Hee-jeong	₩1,300,000,000	26	KLPGA	
20 Aug	Simone Asia Pacific Cup – Individual	Indonesia	(Philippines) Princess Mary Superal	US$500,000	–		
20 Aug	Simone Asia Pacific Cup – Team	Indonesia	(South Korea) Lee Bo-mee & Ryu So-yeon	US$250,000	–		
2 Oct	Hana Financial Group Championship	South Korea	(South Korea) Kim Su-ji	₩1,500,000,000	20.5	KLPGA	
11 Dec	Hana Financial Group Singapore Women's Open (Note: Reduced to 36 holes due to weather conditions.)	Singapore	(South Korea) Park Ji-young	₩1,000,000,000	19.5	KLPGA	

=== 2023 season ===
Dates	Tournament	Location	Winner(s)	Prize fund	WWGR	Main tour	Ref
18 Jun	DB Group Korea Women's Open	South Korea	(South Korea) Hong Ji-won	₩1,300,000,000	26	KLPGA	
24 Sep	Hana Financial Group Championship	South Korea	(South Korea) Lee Da-yeon	₩1,500,000,000	20.5	KLPGA	
23 Dec	Simone Asia Pacific Cup – Individual	Indonesia	(Thailand) Atthaya Thitikul	US$550,000	–		
23 Dec	Simone Asia Pacific Cup – Team	Indonesia	(Thailand) Atthaya Thitikul & Jaravee Boonchant	US$200,000	–		

=== 2024 season ===
Dates	Tournament	Location	Winner(s)	Prize fund	WWGR	Main tour	Ref
10 Mar	Hana Financial Group Singapore Women's Open	Singapore	(South Korea) Kim Jae-hee	S$1,100,000	18.5	KLPGA	
16 Jun	DB Group Korea Women's Open	South Korea	(South Korea) Ro Seung-hui	₩1,200,000,000	26	KLPGA	
~~15 Sep~~	Golfzon China Open	China	Cancelled	CN¥ 5,000,000	–		
29 Sep	Hana Financial Group Championship	South Korea	(South Korea) Ma Da-som	₩1,500,000,000	20.5	KLPGA	
~~29 Nov~~	Philippines Ladies Open	Philippines	Cancelled	US$300,000	–	TLPGA	
~~7 Dec~~	Simone Asia Pacific Cup – Individual	Indonesia	Cancelled	US$550,000	–		
~~7 Dec~~	Simone Asia Pacific Cup – Team	Indonesia	Cancelled	US$200,000	–		

=== 2025 season ===
Dates	Tournament	Location	Winner	Runner-up	Prize fund	WWGR	Main tour	Ref
26 Jan	Indonesia Women's Open	Indonesia	(South Korea) Hwang Yoo-na	(South Korea) Cho Jeong-min	US$300,000	4	KDT	
14 Feb	Philippine Ladies Masters	Philippines	(South Korea) Kim Ka-young	(Thailand) Budsabakorn Sukapan	US$200,000	4	TLPGA	

=== 2026 season ===
Dates	Tournament	Location	Winner	Runners-up	Prize fund	WWGR	Main tour	Ref
1 Feb	Indonesia Women's Open	Indonesia	(Thailand) Jaravee Boonchant	(South Korea) Kim Seo-yoon2 (Thailand) Prim Prachnakorn (a)	US$600,000	3.80	KDT	

== Order of Merit winners ==
=== Ladies Asian Golf Tour ===
Year	Player	Country	Events	Earnings (US$)
2017	Pannarat Thanapolboonyaras	Thailand	1	13,216
2016	Leticia Ras-Anderica	Germany	2	7,581
2015	Kanphanitnan Muangkhumsakul	Thailand	3	25,777
2014	Pornanong Phatlum	Thailand	1	82,500
2013	Pornanong Phatlum	Thailand	3	116,295
2012	Patcharajutar Kongkraphan	Thailand	10	87,966
2011	Yani Tseng	Chinese Taipei	1	62,550
2010	Lee-Anne Pace	South Africa	3	88,330
2009	Bo-Mi Suh	South Korea	2	48,500
2008	Hee-Kyung Seo	South Korea	1	45,000
2007	Na Da-ye	South Korea	2	44,500
2006	Eun-Hee Ji	South Korea	3	28,845

== See also ==
- Asian Tour
