= Hong Kong Ladies Masters =

Golf tournament

Tournament information
- Location: Hong Kong
- Established: 2006
- Course(s): Jockey Club Kau Sai Chau GC (2006); Discovery Bay GC (2007)
- Tour(s): Ladies Asian Golf Tour
- Format: Stroke play
- Prize fund: $80,000
- Final year: 2007

Final champion
- (United States) Libby Smith

The Hong Kong Ladies Masters was a golf tournament on the Ladies Asian Golf Tour hosted in Hong Kong.

== History ==
The event was played at the par-73 Kau Sai Chau's North Course in 2005 and at the par-72 Discovery Bay in 2006. The prize money of the tournament was US$80,000 through co-sponsorship by Cathay Pacific' Asia Miles.

The inaugural event in 2006 was won by sixteen-year-old Pornanong Phatlum, who would not pick up the first-prize cheque due to her amateur status. The following year American Libby Smith recorded her first professional win by beating Shih Huei-ju of Taiwan at the first hole of a sudden death playoff, after they had tied on 212 following rounds of 66 and 68 respectively.

After a few years absence Hong Kong became a stop on the Ladies Asian Golf Tour again in 2015 with the Hong Kong Ladies Open.

== Winners ==
Year	Dates	Venue	Winner	Country	Winning score	To par	Margin of victory	Runner(s)-up
2007	Jan 31 – Feb 2	Discovery Bay GC	Libby Smith	United States	212	-4	Playoff	(Chinese Taipei) Shih Huei-ju
2006	Feb 8–10	Kau Sai Chau GC	Pornanong Phatlum (am)	Thailand	216	-3	1 stroke	(Thailand) Russamme Gulyanamitta (China) Zhong Xiaolong

== See also ==
- Hong Kong Ladies Open
