= 2011 Ladies European Tour =

Professional women's golf tour

2011 Ladies European Tour season
- Duration: February 2011 – December 2011
- Number of official events: 27
- Most wins: (Sweden) Caroline Hedwall (4)
- Order of Merit: (Japan) Ai Miyazato
- Player of the Year: (Sweden) Caroline Hedwall
- Rookie of the Year: (Sweden) Caroline Hedwall
- Lowest stroke average: (Norway) Suzann Pettersen

The 2011 Ladies European Tour was a series of golf tournaments for elite female golfers from around the world which took place from February through December 2011. The tournaments were sanctioned by the Ladies European Tour (LET).

The tour featured 24 official money events, as well as the Tenerife Ladies Match Play, the European Nations Cup and the Solheim Cup. Ai Miyazato won the Order of Merit with earnings of €363,080, despite only playing in two events. Caroline Hedwall won Rookie of the Year and Player of the Year honours, after finishing third in the Order of Merit and winning four events.

== Schedule ==
The table below shows the 2011 schedule. The numbers in brackets after the winners' names show the number of career wins they had on the Ladies European Tour up to and including that event. This is only shown for members of the tour.

Key

Major championships
LET majors in **bold**
Regular events
Team championships

| Date | Tournament | Host country | Winner | Purse (€) | Other tours (Note: ALPG − ALPG Tour, LAGT − Ladies Asian Golf Tour, LPGA − LPGA Tour.) | Notes |
|---|---|---|---|---|---|---|
| 6 Feb | ISPS Handa Women's Australian Open | Australia | (Taiwan) Yani Tseng (n/a) | A$600,000 | ALPG | |
| 13 Feb | ANZ RACV Ladies Masters | Australia | (Taiwan) Yani Tseng (n/a) | A$500,000 | ALPG | |
| 20 Feb | Pegasus New Zealand Women's Open | New Zealand | (Australia) Kristie Smith (1) | 200,000 | ALPG | |
| 17 Apr | European Nations Cup | Spain | (Sweden) Anna Nordqvist (2) & Sophie Gustafson (16) | 350,000 | | Team event; Unofficial prize money |
| 3 Apr | Lalla Meryem Cup | Morocco | (Slovakia) Zuzana Kamasová (1) | 325,000 | | |
| 8 May | Turkish Airlines Ladies Open | Turkey | (Netherlands) Christel Boeljon (1) | 250,000 | | |
| 15 May | ISPS Handa Portugal Ladies Open | Portugal | (South Africa) Ashleigh Simon (2) | 300,000 | | |
| 22 May | UniCredit Ladies German Open | Germany | (Italy) Diana Luna (4) | 330,000 | | |
| 29 May | Allianz Ladies Slovak Open | Slovakia | (Sweden) Caroline Hedwall (1) | 350,000 | | |
| 5 Jun | Deloitte Ladies Open | Netherlands | (England) Melissa Reid (2) | 250,000 | | |
| 19 Jun | Deutsche Bank Ladies Swiss Open | Switzerland | (Italy) Diana Luna (5) | 525,000 | | |
| 3 Jul | Finnair Masters | Finland | (Sweden) Caroline Hedwall (2) | 200,000 | | |
| 24 Jul | **Evian Masters** | France | (Japan) Ai Miyazato (2) | $3,250,000 | LPGA | |
| 31 Jul | **Ricoh Women's British Open** | Scotland | (Taiwan) Yani Tseng (n/a) | $2,500,000 | LPGA | |
| 7 Aug | Ladies Irish Open | Ireland | (Norway) Suzann Pettersen (5) | 400,000 | | |
| 20 Aug | Aberdeen Ladies Scottish Open | Scotland | (Scotland) Catriona Matthew (4) | 220,000 | | |
| 4 Sep | UNIQA Ladies Golf Open | Austria | (Sweden) Caroline Hedwall (3) | 200,000 | | |
| 11 Sep | Raiffeisenbank Prague Golf Masters | Czech Republic | (France) Jade Schaeffer (2) | 350,000 | | New tournament |
| 18 Sep | Open De España Femenino | Spain | (England) Melissa Reid (3) | 350,000 | | |
| 2 Oct | Lacoste Ladies Open de France | France | (England) Felicity Johnson (2) | 250,000 | | |
| 9 Oct | Sicilian Ladies Italian Open | Italy | (United States) Christina Kim (1) | 200,000 | | Last played in 2009 |
| 23 Oct | Sanya Ladies Open | China | (Australia) Frances Bondad (1) | 200,000 | LAGT | |
| 30 Oct | Suzhou Taihu Ladies Open | China | (Taiwan) Yani Tseng (n/a) | 300,000 | LAGT | |
| 11 Dec | Hero Women's Indian Open | India | (Sweden) Caroline Hedwall (4) | 300,000 | LAGT | |
| 17 Dec | Omega Dubai Ladies Masters | United Arab Emirates | (United States) Lexi Thompson (n/a) | 500,000 | | |

=== Unofficial events ===
The following events appear on the schedule, but do not carry official money or Order of Merit ranking points.

| Date | Tournament | Host country | Winner(s) | Purse (€) | Other tours | Notes |
|---|---|---|---|---|---|---|
| 12 Jun | Tenerife Ladies Match Play | Spain | (Wales) Becky Brewerton | 120,000 | | Limited field event |
| 25 Sep | Solheim Cup | Ireland | (European Union) Europe | – | LPGA | |

== Order of Merit rankings ==
| Rank | Player | Country | Earnings (€) |
|---|---|---|---|
| 1 | Ai Miyazato | Japan | 363,080 |
| 2 | Melissa Reid | England | 286,578 |
| 3 | Caroline Hedwall | Sweden | 278,529 |
| 4 | Diana Luna | Italy | 223,405 |
| 5 | Lee-Anne Pace | South Africa | 209,444 |
| 6 | Sophie Gustafson | Sweden | 188,889 |
| 7 | Caroline Masson | Germany | 167,187 |
| 8 | Christel Boeljon | Netherlands | 161,172 |
| 9 | Suzann Pettersen | Norway | 142,087 |
| 10 | In-Kyung Kim | South Korea | 141,275 |

== Location of tournaments ==
Location of tournaments in Europe.
Major championship
National open
Regular event
Team event or Solheim Cup
Location of tournaments outside Europe.
National open
Regular event
