= 2015 Ladies European Tour =

Professional women's golf tour

2015 Ladies European Tour season
- Duration: February 2015 – December 2015
- Number of official events: 21
- Most wins: (New Zealand) Lydia Ko (3)
- Order of Merit: (China) Shanshan Feng
- Player of the Year: (Denmark) Nicole Broch Larsen
- Rookie of the Year: (Denmark) Emily Kristine Pedersen
- Lowest stroke average: (China) Shanshan Feng

The 2015 Ladies European Tour was a series of golf tournaments for elite female golfers from around the world, which took place from February through December 2015. The tournaments were sanctioned by the Ladies European Tour (LET).

== Schedule ==
The table below partially shows the 2015 schedule. The numbers in brackets after the winners' names indicate the career wins on the Ladies European Tour, including that event, and is only shown for members of the tour.

Key

Major championships
Regular events
Team championships

Date	Tournament	Host country	Winner	WWGR points	Purse	Other tours (Note: ALPG − ALPG Tour, CLPGA − China LPGA Tour, JLPGA − LPGA of Japan Tour, KLPGA − LPGA of Korea Tour, LAGT − Ladies Asian Golf Tour, LPGA − LPGA Tour.)	Notes
15 Feb	Volvik RACV Ladies Masters	Australia	(Australia) Su-Hyun Oh (1)	15	€250,000	ALPG	
22 Feb	ISPS Handa Women's Australian Open	Australia	(New Zealand) Lydia Ko (2)	37	$1,200,000	ALPG, LPGA	
1 Mar	ISPS Handa New Zealand Women's Open	New Zealand	(New Zealand) Lydia Ko (3)	19	€200,000	ALPG	
15 Mar	Mission Hills World Ladies Championship	China	(South Korea) Ryu So-yeon (n/a)	19	$400,000	CLPGA	Individual event
29 Mar	Lalla Meryem Cup	Morocco	(France) Gwladys Nocera (14)	15	€450,000		
10 May	Buick Championship	China	(China) Shanshan Feng (4)	17	€400,000	CLPGA	
20 May	Turkish Airlines Ladies Open	Turkey	(England) Melissa Reid (5)	12	€500,000		
21 Jun	Deloitte Ladies Open	Netherlands	(Netherlands) Christel Boeljon (4)	12	€250,000		
5 Jul	ISPS Handa Ladies European Masters	England	(United States) Beth Allen (1)	15	€500,000		
26 Jul	Aberdeen Asset Management Ladies Scottish Open	Scotland	(Australia) Rebecca Artis (2)	18	€500,000		
2 Aug	Ricoh Women's British Open	Scotland	(South Korea) Inbee Park (n/a)	100	$3,000,000	LPGA	
9 Aug	Tipsport Golf Masters	Czech Republic	(England) Hannah Burke (1)	14	€300,000		
6 Sep	Helsingborg Open	Sweden	(Denmark) Nicole Broch Larsen (1)	10	€250,000		
13 Sep	The Evian Championship	France	(New Zealand) Lydia Ko (4)	100	$3,250,000	LPGA	
27 Sep	Lacoste Ladies Open de France	France	(France) Céline Herbin (1)	16	€250,000		
11 Oct	Xiamen International Ladies Open	China	(South Korea) Hye In-yeom (1)	12	€300,000	CLPGA	
25 Oct	Hero Women's Indian Open	India	(Denmark) Emily Kristine Pedersen (1)	6	$500,000	LAGT	
8 Nov	Sanya Ladies Open	China	(China) Lin Xiyu (2)	16	€300,000	CLPGA, LAGT	
12 Dec	Omega Dubai Ladies Masters	United Arab Emirates	(China) Shanshan Feng (5)	17	$625,000		

=== Unofficial events ===
The following events appear on the schedule, but do not carry official money or Order of Merit ranking points.

Date	Tournament	Host country	Winners	WWGR points	Purse	Other tours	Notes
15 Mar	Mission Hills World Ladies Championship	China	(South Korea) Ryu So-yeon & Inbee Park	–	$100,000	CLPGA	Team event
20 Sep	Solheim Cup	Germany	United States	–	–	LPGA	
6 Dec	The Queens	Japan	LPGA of Japan Tour	–	€750,000	ALPG, JLPGA, KLPGA	Team match play

== Order of Merit rankings ==
Rank	Player	Country	Earnings (€)
1	Shanshan Feng	China	399,213
2	Melissa Reid	England	249,151
3	Nicole Broch Larsen	Denmark	235,877
4	Gwladys Nocera	France	214,066
5	Beth Allen	United States	179,011
6	Emily Kristine Pedersen	Denmark	171,688
7	Rebecca Artis	Australia	160,829
8	Charley Hull	England	135,416
9	Nanna Koerstz Madsen	Denmark	134,769
10	Amy Boulden	Wales	125,634

== Location of tournaments ==
Location of tournaments in Europe.
Major championship
National open
Regular event
Solheim Cup
Location of tournaments outside Europe.
National open
Regular event
Team event

== See also ==
- 2015 LPGA Tour
- 2015 LET Access Series
