= Taiwan Open =

Taiwan Open may refer to:

== Tennis ==
- WTA Taiwan Open, an international level WTA tournament, 2016–2018
- Taipei Women's Championships or Taiwan Open, a defunct WTA tournament, 1986–89 and 1992–94
- Taipei Open or Taiwan Open, a WTA 125k level tournament, 2007–2019

== Other sports ==
- Taiwan Open (golf), a tournament in Taiwan, 1965–2006
- Taiwan Ladies Open, a professional golf tournament in Taiwan on the Ladies European Tour
- Taiwan Open of Surfing, an Asian Surfing Championships tournament in Jinzun Harbor, Taitung, Taiwan
- Taipei Open (badminton), a BWF-sanctioned international badminton championship
