= Russamee Gulyanamitta =

Thai professional golfer

Personal information
- Full name: Russamee Gulyanamitta
- Nicknames: Russy, Fon
- Nationality: Thailand
- Born: 31 March 1976 (age 50) Rayong, Thailand
- Height: 5 ft 7 in (1.70 m)

Career
- Sport: Golf
- College: Chulalongkorn University
- Turned professional: 2001
- Former tours: LPGA Tour; Futures Tour; Ladies Asian Golf Tour
- Professional wins: 3

Number of wins by tour
- Ladies Asian Golf Tour: 1
- Epson Tour: 1
- Other: 1

Best results in LPGA major championships
- Chevron Championship: T51: 2008
- Women's PGA C'ship: CUT: 2008
- U.S. Women's Open: CUT: 2002, 2004
- Women's British Open: DNP
Medal record
Women's golf
Representing Thailand
SEA Games
Gold medal – first place	1999 Bandar Seri Begawan	Individual
Gold medal – first place	1999 Bandar Seri Begawan	Team

Russamee "Russy" Gulyanamitta (Thai: รัศมี กัลยาณมิตร; born 31 March 1976), also known by the nickname Fon (Thai: ฝน), is a Thai professional golfer who has played on the LPGA Tour, the Futures Tour, and the Ladies Asian Golf Tour. She became the first player from Thailand to join the LPGA Tour in 2004. As an amateur, she won individual and team titles at the 1999 SEA Games and finished runner-up at the 2000 U.S. Women's Amateur Public Links. As a professional, she won the 2001 Coleman Golf Classic on the Futures Tour and the 2003 Taiwan Kosaido Ladies Open on the Ladies Asian Golf Tour, and finished runner-up at the 2008 SBS Open at Turtle Bay on the LPGA Tour.

== Early life and education ==
Gulyanamitta was born on 31 March 1976 in Rayong, Thailand. She graduated with a bachelor's degree in engineering from Chulalongkorn University in 1998. She began playing golf at the age of 10.

== Amateur career ==
In 1999, Gulyanamitta won two gold medals at the 1999 SEA Games in Brunei, taking titles in both the individual and team events. The following year, while playing for Cypress College, she won the California community college women's state championship and finished runner-up at the U.S. Women's Amateur Public Links. In the final, played at Legacy Golf Links in Aberdeen, North Carolina, she lost to Catherine Cartwright, 3 and 1.

== Professional career ==
Gulyanamitta turned professional in March 2001 and joined the Futures Tour. Later that year, she won the Coleman Golf Classic in Wichita, Kansas, shooting 207 to finish one stroke ahead of Connie Wei. She also competed on the Ladies Asian Golf Tour from 2001 to 2007.

In 2003, Gulyanamitta tied for 32nd at the LPGA Final Qualifying Tournament, earning non-exempt status for the 2004 LPGA Tour season. During the same year, she won the Taiwan Kosaido Ladies Open, lost in a playoff at the Malaysian Kosaido Ladies Open, and led the Order of Merit on the Kosaido Ladies Asia Golf Circuit. Her 2004 LPGA Tour status made her the first player from Thailand to join the LPGA Tour.

Gulyanamitta played 15 LPGA Tour events in 2004 and made three cuts, but did not retain her tour card. She later competed on the Cactus Tour in 2006 and 2007, and on the Canadian Ladies Tour in 2007. In March 2007, she finished runner-up at the inaugural DLF Women's Indian Open, losing to Yani Tseng in a playoff after both players finished at one-under-par 215. At the LPGA Final Qualifying Tournament later that year, she finished sixth to regain exempt status for the 2008 LPGA Tour season.

Gulyanamitta opened the 2008 season with a career-best runner-up finish at the SBS Open at Turtle Bay in Kahuku, Hawaii, shooting rounds of 71, 69 and 68 to finish tied for second with Laura Diaz and Jane Park, two strokes behind Annika Sörenstam. The result moved her to 11th on the LPGA money list and helped her qualify for her first Kraft Nabisco Championship. She went on to finish tied for 51st in the event, her best result in a major championship. Later that season, she carded a career-low 67 in the final round of the Ginn Open, where she tied for 17th. In 2009, Gulyanamitta made nine cuts in 16 LPGA starts, with a season-best tie for 12th. She earned $72,147 and finished 102nd on the LPGA money list. In 2013, She was among several Thai players who attempted to regain playing rights on the LPGA of Japan Tour.

== Personal life ==
Gulyanamitta has a younger sister, Numa Gulyanamitta, who is also a professional golfer and has played on the LPGA Tour.

== Professional wins (3) ==
=== Futures Tour wins (1) ===
No.	Date	Tournament	Winning score	To par	Margin of victory	Runner-up	Winner's share ($)	Ref.
1	29 April 2001	Coleman Golf Classic	67-71-69=207	−9	1 stroke	(Taiwan) Connie Wei	8,400	

=== Ladies Asian Golf Tour wins (1) ===
- 2003 Taiwan Kosaido Ladies Open

=== Thai LPGA Tour wins (1) ===
- 2010 6th SAT-TLPGA Championship

== Results in LPGA majors ==
Tournament	2002	2003	2004	2005	2006	2007	2008
Kraft Nabisco Championship							T51
LPGA Championship							CUT
U.S. Women's Open	CUT		CUT				
Women's British Open							

Did not play

CUT = missed the half-way cut
"T" = tied

== Team appearances ==
Amateur

- Queen Sirikit Cup (representing Thailand): 1993, 1996, 1997, 1999
- SEA Games (representing Thailand): 1999 (winners)
