= Christel Boeljon =

Dutch professional golfer (born 1987)

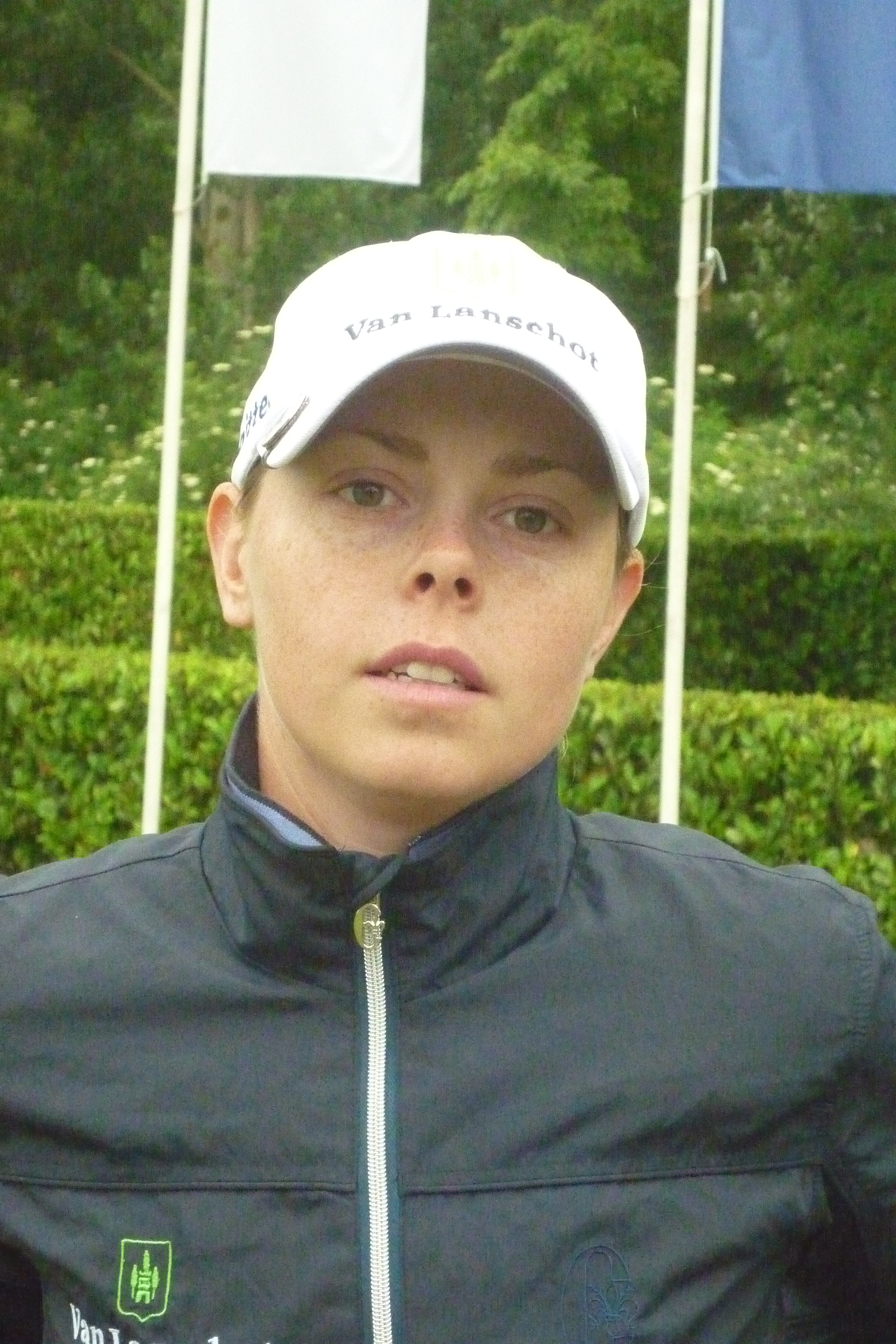

Personal information
- Full name: Christel Wilhelmina Boeljon
- Nationality: Netherlands
- Born: 30 July 1987 (age 39) Beverwijk, Netherlands
- Height: 5 ft 5 in (1.65 m)

Career
- Sport: Golf
- College: Purdue University
- Turned professional: 2009
- Current tours: Ladies European Tour (joined 2009); LPGA Tour (joined 2011)
- Professional wins: 4

Number of wins by tour
- Ladies European Tour: 4

Best results in LPGA major championships
- Chevron Championship: T15: 2011
- Women's PGA C'ship: T23: 2012
- U.S. Women's Open: CUT: 2012, 2013, 2014
- Women's British Open: T47: 2013
- Evian Championship: CUT: 2013, 2014

Christel Wilhelmina Boeljon (born 30 July 1987) is a professional golfer from the Netherlands, currently playing on the Ladies European Tour and the U.S.-based LPGA Tour.

== Early life and amateur career ==
In 1987, Boeljon was born in Beverwijk. One day she joined her parents for a visit to the Golfclub Spaarnwoude, and two years later she gave up field hockey and concentrated on golf. She won a number of tournaments as a junior including the Mevrouw Swanebeker and Dutch Junior Masters in 2002. She also won the Netherlands' National Match Play U-21 in 2003 and 2005. In 2005, she was also semi-finalist at the British Ladies Amateur.

In 2005, she continued her studies in the United States and accepted a golf scholarship to Purdue University in Indiana. In her first 25 tournaments she played 24 rounds under par.

== Professional career ==
Boeljon turned professional in 2009, when she returned from Purdue. She went to the Ladies European Tour's qualifying school in 2008, won the first stage and finished 4th at the final stage in 2009. She began well, she made the cut at the ANZ Ladies Masters in Australia and finished 41st. In April, she won the European Ladies Golf Cup together with Marjet van der Graaff. In June she again won the National Stroke Play. She made the cut at the 2009 Women's British Open and finished 57th.

In 2011, she played her first major in the United States, the Kraft Nabisco Championship and finished 15th. A few weeks later she won the Turkish Airlines Ladies Open in Belek, then finished 2nd at the Ladies Slovak Open, which was good enough to become the leader of the Ladies European Tour money list.

== Amateur wins ==
- 2002 Mevrouw Swanebeker, Dutch Junior Masters
- 2003 National Match Play U-21
- 2005 National Stroke Play U-21
- 2006 Dutch International Junior Open

== Professional wins (4) ==
=== Ladies European Tour (4) ===
No.	Date	Tournament	Winning score	To par	Margin of victory	Runner(s)-up	Winner's share (€)
1	8 May 2011	Turkish Airlines Ladies Open	73-71-70-73=287	–5	3 strokes	(England) Florentyna Parker (Wales) Becky Brewerton	37,500
2	5 Feb 2012	Gold Coast RACV Australian Ladies Masters	66-65-68-68=267	–21	1 stroke	(Italy) Diana Luna (South Korea) Kim Ha-neul (South Korea) So Yeon Ryu	63,631
3	13 May 2012	Turkish Airlines Ladies Open	70-73-69-73=285	–7	3 strokes	(Finland) Ursula Wikström	37,500
4	21 Jun 2015	Deloitte Ladies Open	69-69-71=209	–10	4 strokes	(Finland) Ursula Wikström (Denmark) Emily Kristine Pedersen	37,500

== Results in LPGA majors ==
Results not in chronological order before 2015.

Tournament	2009	2010	2011	2012	2013	2014	2015	2016
ANA Inspiration			T15	T56	T41	T55		CUT
Women's PGA Championship			T57	T23	CUT	CUT	CUT	CUT
U.S. Women's Open				CUT	CUT	CUT		
Women's British Open	T57	CUT	T54	CUT	T47	CUT		
The Evian Championship ^					CUT	CUT		

^ The Evian Championship was added as a major in 2013

Did not play

CUT = missed the half-way cut
"T" = tied

=== Summary ===
Tournament	Wins	2nd	3rd	Top-5	Top-10	Top-25	Events	Cuts made
ANA Inspiration	0	0	0	0	0	1	5	4
Women's PGA Championship	0	0	0	0	0	1	6	2
U.S. Women's Open	0	0	0	0	0	0	3	0
Women's British Open	0	0	0	0	0	0	6	3
The Evian Championship	0	0	0	0	0	0	2	0
Totals	0	0	0	0	0	2	22	9

- Most consecutive cuts made – 5 (2011 Kraft Nabisco – 2012 LPGA)
- Longest streak of top-10s – 0

== Ladies European Tour career summary ==
Year	Tournaments played	Cuts made	Wins	2nd	3rd	Top 10s	Best finish	Earnings (€)	Money list rank	Scoring average	Scoring rank
2004	1	0	0	0	0	0	CUT	n/a		77.50	
2006	1	1	0	0	0	0	T55	n/a		73.67	
2007	1	1	0	0	0	0	T11	n/a		71.00	
2008	1	1	0	0	0	1	T10	n/a		70.33	
2009	17	14	0	0	0	1	T5	48,893	35	72.45	37
2010	20	14	0	3	1	7	T2	121,959	12	72.33	35
2011	15	13	1	2	1	6	1	161,172	8	70.92	13
2012	6	3	2	0	0	2	1	104,884	13	72.00	
2013	7	6	0	0	0	1	5	38,731		72.96	
2014	5	2	0	0	0	1	T4	14,650	–	73.83	

- as of 2014 season

== LPGA Tour career summary ==
Year	Tournaments played	Cuts made	Wins	2nd	3rd	Top 10s	Best finish	Earnings ($)	Money list rank	Scoring average	Scoring rank
2011	14	12	0	0	0	2	T9	170,553	52	72.31	14
2012	20	10	0	0	0	0	T23	89,817	81	73.47	91
2013	20	14	0	0	0	1	T7	163,260	67	72.38	63
2014	20	10	0	0	0	1	T7	120,064	84	72.64	98
2015	12	7	0	1	0	1	2	157,280	78	73.73	130
2016	17	5	0	0	0	1	T6	61,606	114	73.31	137

- official through the 2016 season

== World ranking ==
Position in Women's World Golf Rankings at the end of each calendar year.

Year	World ranking	Source
2007	648	
2008	703	
2009	274	
2010	118	
2011	63	
2012	82	
2013	143	
2014	192	
2015	94	
2016	221	

== Team appearances ==
Amateur

- European Ladies' Team Championship (representing Netherlands): 2005, 2007, 2008
- Espirito Santo Trophy (representing Netherlands): 2006, 2008

Professional

- European Ladies Golf Cup: 2009 (winner)
- Solheim Cup (representing Europe): 2011 (winners)

=== Solheim Cup record ===
Year	Total Matches	Total W-L-H	Singles W-L-H	Foursomes W-L-H	Fourballs W-L-H	Points Won	Points %
Career	3	1-2-0	1-0-0	0-1-0	0-1-0	1.0	33.3
2011	3	1-2-0	1-0-0 def. B. Lincicome 2 up	0-1-0 lost w/ K. Stupples 3&2	0-1-0 lost w/ S. Gal 2&1	1.0	33.3
