= 2013 Ladies European Tour =

Professional women's golf tour

2013 Ladies European Tour season
- Duration: February 2013 – December 2013
- Number of official events: 23
- Most wins: (South Africa) Lee-Anne Pace (3)
- Order of Merit: (Norway) Suzann Pettersen
- Player of the Year: (South Africa) Lee-Anne Pace
- Rookie of the Year: (England) Charley Hull
- Lowest stroke average: (Norway) Suzann Pettersen

The 2013 Ladies European Tour was the 35th season of the Ladies European Tour (LET), a series of golf tournaments for elite female golfers from around the world, which took place from February through December 2013.

== Changes for 2013 ==
The tour scheduled a total of 23 events, including the return of the Ladies Italian Open, which hadn't been on the tour since 2009. It also features the bi-annual Europe vs. USA Solheim Cup, which will rotate its turn to the United States for 2013. Also added to the tour is the Helsingborg Open in Sweden.

Leaving the tour for 2013 were the Deutsche Bank Ladies Swiss Open (Switzerland), the Ladies Irish Open (Ireland), and the UNIQA Ladies Golf Open (Austria).

The tour chronologically moved some of the events. Moving upwards on the calendar ware the South African Women's Open by three months, and the Open de España Femenino by three months. Moving back on the calendar ware the Honma Pilsen Golf Masters by two months, The Evian Championship by two months, and the Ladies Scottish Open by three months.

== Schedule ==
The table below shows the 2013 schedule. The numbers in brackets after the winners' names indicate the career wins on the Ladies European Tour, including that event, and is only shown for members of the tour.

Key

Major championships
Regular events
Team championships

Date	Tournament	Host country	Winner	WWGR points	Purse (€)	Other tours (Note: ALPG − ALPG Tour, CLPGA − China LPGA Tour, LAGT − Ladies Asian Golf Tour, LPGA − LPGA Tour, SLT − Sunshine Ladies Tour.)	Notes
3 Feb	Volvik RACV Ladies Masters	Australia	(Australia) Karrie Webb (n/a)	19.5	200,000	ALPG	
10 Feb	ISPS Handa New Zealand Women's Open	New Zealand	(New Zealand) Lydia Ko (n/a, amateur)	19	200,000	ALPG	
17 Feb	ISPS Handa Women's Australian Open	Australia	(South Korea) Jiyai Shin (n/a)	37	$1,300,000	ALPG, LPGA	
10 Mar	Mission Hills World Ladies Championship	China	(Norway) Suzann Pettersen (6)	20.5	$500,000	CLPGA	Individual event
31 Mar	Lalla Meryem Cup	Morocco	(Thailand) Ariya Jutanugarn (1)	15	325,000		
21 Apr	South African Women's Open	South Africa	(Norway) Marianne Skarpnord (3)	–	290,000	SLT	
12 May	Turkish Airlines Ladies Open	Turkey	(South Africa) Lee-Anne Pace (6)	15	250,000		
26 May	Deloitte Ladies Open	Netherlands	(England) Holly Clyburn (1)	15.5	250,000		
2 Jun	UniCredit Ladies German Open	Germany	(Spain) Carlota Ciganda (3)	–	350,000		
23 Jun	Allianz Ladies Slovak Open	Slovakia	(France) Gwladys Nocera (11)	15	250,000		
21 Jul	Open de España Femenino	Spain	(South Africa) Lee-Anne Pace (7)	15	350,000		
28 Jul	ISPS Handa Ladies European Masters	England	(Australia) Karrie Webb (n/a)	17	300,000		
4 Aug	Ricoh Women's British Open	Scotland	(United States) Stacy Lewis (n/a)	100	$3,500,000	LPGA	
11 Aug	Honma Pilsen Golf Masters	Czech Republic	(Germany) Ann-Kathrin Lindner (1)	15	250,000		
1 Sep	Aberdeen Asset Management Ladies Scottish Open	Scotland	(Scotland) Catriona Matthew (6)	15	£180,000		
8 Sep	Helsingborg Open	Sweden	(Australia) Rebecca Artis (1)	16.5	250,000		
15 Sep	The Evian Championship	France	(Norway) Suzann Pettersen (7)	100	$3,250,000	LPGA	
29 Sep	Lacoste Ladies Open de France	France	(Spain) Azahara Muñoz (2)	15.5	250,000		
27 Oct	Sanya Ladies Open	China	(South Africa) Lee-Anne Pace (8)	15	300,000	CLPGA, LAGT	
3 Nov	China Suzhou Taihu Open	China	(France) Gwladys Nocera (12)	15	400,000	CLPGA, LAGT	
30 Nov	Hero Women's Indian Open	India	(Thailand) Thidapa Suwannapura (n/a)	15	$300,000	LAGT	
7 Dec	Omega Dubai Ladies Masters	U.A.E.	(Thailand) Pornanong Phatlum (2)	19	500,000		

=== Unofficial events ===
The following events appear on the schedule, but do not carry official money or Order of Merit ranking points.

Date	Tournament	Host country	Winners	WWGR points	Purse	Other tours	Notes
10 Mar	Mission Hills World Ladies Championship	China	(South Korea) Inbee Park and Kim Ha-Neul	–	$100,000	CLPGA	Team event
18 Aug	Solheim Cup	United States	(European Union) Europe	–	–	LPGA	

== Order of Merit rankings ==
Rank	Player	Country	Earnings (€)
1	Suzann Pettersen	Norway	518,449
2	Lee-Anne Pace	South Africa	250,927
3	Lexi Thompson	United States	228,794
4	Gwladys Nocera	France	221,288
5	Carlota Ciganda	Spain	173,329
6	Charley Hull	England	135,994
7	Holly Clyburn	England	116,101
8	Beatriz Recari	Spain	114,936
9	Shanshan Feng	China	106,166
10	Valentine Derrey	France	97,685

== Location of tournaments ==
Location of tournaments in Europe.
Major championship
National open
Regular event
Location of tournaments outside Europe.
National open
Regular event
Team event or Solheim Cup
