= Macau Ladies Open =

Golf tournament

Tournament information
- Location: Coloane, Macau
- Established: 2006
- Course(s): Macau Golf & Country Club
- Par: 71
- Tour(s): Ladies Asian Golf Tour
- Format: 54-hole stroke play
- Prize fund: $80,000
- Final year: 2007

Final champion
- (United States) Natalie Tucker

The Macau Ladies Open was a golf tournament on the Ladies Asian Golf Tour hosted in Macau.

It was only held in 2006 and 2007, and played at the Macau Golf & Country Club, same venue as the Macau Open.

== Winners ==
Year	Dates	Winner	Country	Winning score	To par	Purse ($)
Macau Ladies Open
2007	24–26 Jan	Natalie Tucker	United States	217	+4	80,000
Macau LAGT Championship
2006	22–24 Mar	Ji Eun-hee	South Korea	143^	+1	80,000

^ Weather-shortened to 36 holes

== See also ==
- Hong Kong Ladies Open
