= Tracy Hanson =

American professional golfer

Personal information
- Nationality: United States
- Born: October 28, 1971 (age 55) Coeur D'Alene, Idaho, U.S.
- Height: 5 ft 7 in (1.70 m)

Career
- Sport: Golf
- College: San Jose State University
- Turned professional: 1993
- Former tours: LPGA Tour (1995–2008); Ladies European Tour (1994)
- Professional wins: 1

Number of wins by tour
- Ladies Asian Golf Tour: 1

Best results in LPGA major championships
- Chevron Championship: T10: 1996
- Women's PGA C'ship: T30: 2003
- U.S. Women's Open: T28: 2006
- du Maurier Classic: T24: 1997
- Women's British Open: T12: 2001

Achievements and awards
- LET Rookie of the Year: 1994
- NGCA Hall of Fame: 2003

Tracy Hanson (born October 28, 1971) is a retired American professional golfer who played on the LPGA Tour between 1995 and 2008. She was the 1991 U.S. Women's Amateur Public Links champion and won the 1994 Indonesia Ladies Open.

== College and amateur career ==
Hanson captured numerous titles as an amateur, including the 1989 Women's Western Junior Championship and the 1991 U.S. Women's Amateur Public Links. She was the low amateur at the 1991 U.S. Women's Open, and member of the 1992 U.S. Curtis Cup Team.

Hanson played collegiate golf at San Jose State University, where she won 10 collegiate titles and was a member of the 1992 NCAA National Championship team. She was a four-time All-American and three-time Academic All-American.

== Professional career ==
Hanson turned professional in 1993 and played on the Ladies European Tour in 1994, where she was LET Rookie of the Year after runner-up finishes at the Austrian Ladies Open and the BMW European Masters in Belgium. She won the Indonesia Ladies Open and two Pacific Northwest Golf Tour titles.

Hanson tied for 12th at the LPGA Final Qualifying Tournament to earn a card for the 1995 LPGA Tour. Her best finish was a tie for fourth at the GHP Heartland Classic, and she finished runner-up in the Rookie of the Year race, just five points behind winner Pat Hurst.

Hanson was runner-up twice on the LPGA Tour, at the 1998 Rainbow Foods LPGA Classic where she lost to Hiromi Kobayashi on the first hole of a sudden-death playoff, and at the 2001 Asahi Ryokuken International Championship at Mount Vintage, one stroke behind Tina Fischer.

In 2022, in her first year of eligibility, she qualified for the U.S. Senior Women's Open.

== Amateur wins ==
- 1989 Women's Western Junior Championship
- 1991 U.S. Women's Amateur Public Links

== Professional wins (1) ==
=== Ladies Asian Golf Tour wins (1) ===
- 1994 Indonesia Ladies Open

== Playoff record ==
LPGA Tour playoff record (0–1)

No.	Year	Tournament	Opponent(s)	Result
1	1998	Rainbow Foods LPGA Classic	(Japan) Hiromi Kobayashi	Lost to birdie on first extra hole

== U.S. national team appearances ==
Amateur

- Curtis Cup: 1992
