= Yumeya Dream Cup =

Tournament information
- Location: Aichi, Japan
- Established: 2011
- Course: Hirao Country Club
- Par: 72
- Tour: Ladies Asian Golf Tour
- Format: 54 holes Stroke play
- Prize fund: $200,000
- Final year: 2013

Final champion
- (Japan) Yumika Adachi

The Yumeya Dream Cup was a professional golf tournament on the Ladies Asian Golf Tour held in Japan between 2011 and 2013.

The tournament was founded as the Yumeya Championship and played at the Hirao Country Club in Aichi Prefecture, near Nagoya. It offered prize money of $130,000, raised to $200,000 in 2013.

== Winners ==
Year	Dates	Winner	Score	Margin of victory	Runner-up	Purse ($)
Yumeya Dream Cup
2013	11–13 Apr	(Japan) Yumika Adachi	−6 (72-69-69=210)	7 strokes	(Japan) Orie Fujino	200,000
2012	23–25 Mar	(Taiwan) Yu Pei-Lin	+1 (71-76-70=217)	1 stroke	(Japan) Megumi Shimokawa	250,000
Yumeya Championship
2011	24–26 Feb	(Japan) Sakura Yokomine	−8 (67-67-74=208)	1 stroke	(Japan) Rui Yokomine	130,000
