= Tiffany Chan =

Hong Kong golfer

Personal information
- Nationality: Hong Kong
- Born: 12 September 1993 (age 33) Tuen Mun, Hong Kong
- Height: 5 ft 4 in (163 cm)

Career
- Sport: Golf
- College: Daytona State College; University of Southern California
- Turned professional: 2017
- Current tour: LPGA Tour
- Former tour: Symetra Tour
- Professional wins: 2

Best results in LPGA major championships
- Chevron Championship: DNP
- Women's PGA C'ship: CUT: 2018, 2019, 2021
- U.S. Women's Open: T62: 2019
- Women's British Open: DNP
- Evian Championship: CUT: 2019

Tiffany Chan, born Chan Tsz Ching, (Chinese: 陳芷澄; born 12 September 1993) is a professional golfer from Hong Kong.

Chan attended Daytona State College where she was a two-time NJCAA champion. She played for the University of Southern California in 2016 and 2017.

Chan played on the Hong Kong team in the Espirito Santo Trophy (World Amateur Team Championship) three times (2010, 2012, 2014) and the Asian Games twice (2010, 2014).

In 2016, Chan won the Hong Kong Ladies Open on the Ladies Asian Golf Tour.

Chan qualified for and attended the 2016 Rio Olympics and 2020 Tokyo Olympics, representing Hong Kong.

Chan turned professional in 2017 and competed on the Symetra Tour. She earned her 2018 LPGA Tour card through qualifying school.

== Amateur wins ==
- 2010 Hong Kong Ladies Close, Hong Kong Junior Open
- 2011 Hong Kong Close Amateur, Faldo Series (Hong Kong) Qualifying
- 2012 Hong Kong Ladies Close, Jack Kramer Memorial, China Amateur Open
- 2013 Hatter Classic
- 2014 North Florida Invitational, JMU Eagle Landing Invite, MSU Ocala Spring Invitational, NJCAA National Championship, World University Championship, LPGA Xavier Invitational, FIU Pat Bradley Invitational
- 2015 FGCU Eagle Invitational, Hurricane Invitational, MSU Ocala Spring Invitational, NJCAA Region 8 Championship, NJCAA National Championship

== Professional wins (2) ==
=== LPGA of Taiwan Tour wins (1) ===
- 2015 TLPGA Future Open (as an amateur)

=== Ladies Asian Golf Tour wins (1) ===
- 2016 Hong Kong Ladies Open (as an amateur)

== Team appearances ==
- Espirito Santo Trophy (representing Hong Kong): 2008, 2010, 2012, 2014, 2016
- Patsy Hankins Trophy (representing Asia/Pacific): 2016 (winners)
