= Malaysia Ladies Open =

Golf tournament held in Malaysia

Tournament information
- Location: Malaysia
- Established: 1987
- Par: 72
- Tour: Ladies Asian Golf Tour
- Format: Stroke play
- Prize fund: US$100,000
- Final year: 2003

Final champion
- (India) Smriti Mehra

The Malaysia Ladies Open was a professional golf tournament in Malaysia on the Ladies Asian Golf Tour.

== History ==
The first tournament was played in 1987. The last event was held in 2003, and women's professional golf did not return to Malaysia again until the 2010 Sime Darby LPGA Malaysia.

== Winners ==
- 2003 (India) Smriti Mehra
- 2002 (Japan) Yuka Arita
- 2001 (Japan) Shiho Oyama
- 2000 (South Korea) Kang Soo-yun
- 1999 (England) Johanna Head
- 1998 (France) Sandrine Mendiburu
- 1997 (Sweden) Petra Rigby-Jinglöv
- 1996 (Australia) Corinne Dibnah
- 1995 (Australia) Corinne Dibnah
- 1994 (South Korea) Won Jae-sook
- 1993 (England) Sally Prosser
- 1992 (England) Alison Nicholas
- 1991 (Japan) Chieko Nishida
- 1990 (Japan) Chieko Nishida
- 1989 (Japan) Norimi Terasawa
- 1988 (England) Beverley New
- 1987 (Japan) Ikuyo Shiotani

== See also ==
- Malaysia Open
