= Jaravee Boonchant =

Thai professional golfer (born 1999)

Personal information
- Nickname: Wann
- Nationality: Thailand
- Born: 23 May 1999 (age 27) Bangkok, Thailand
- Height: 5 ft 4 in (163 cm)

Career
- Sport: Golf
- College: Duke University
- Turned professional: 2021
- Current tours: LPGA of Korea Tour; LPGA Tour
- Former tour: Epson Tour
- Professional wins: 5

Number of wins by tour
- LPGA of Korea Tour: 1
- Epson Tour: 1
- Other: 3

Best results in LPGA major championships
- Chevron Championship: DNP
- Women's PGA C'ship: CUT: 2023
- U.S. Women's Open: CUT: 2023, 2026
- Women's British Open: T50: 2023
- Evian Championship: CUT: 2023

Jaravee Boonchant (Thai: จารวี บุญจันทร์; born 23 May 1999) is a Thai professional golfer who has played on the LPGA Tour and the LPGA of Korea Tour. She has won on the Epson Tour, the Ladies Asian Tour and the LPGA of Korea Tour.

== Early life ==
Boonchant was born on 23 May 1999. She started playing golf at the age of 6 years old.

== Amateur career ==
From 2017 to 2021, Boonchant played for the Duke Blue Devils of the Duke University. She was named All-ACC member three times in 2018, 2019, and 2021. She was also named All-American for four times. She helped lead Duke to win the ACC Championships in 2018 and 2021 as well as win the 2019 NCAA Championship. She was named Honda Sports Award finalist in 2019.

In 2021, Boonchant won the Inkster Award, an award given to the highest-ranked women's senior collegiate golfer.

== Professional career ==
=== 2021 ===
Boonchant turned professional in June 2021. On 3 December, she won her maiden professional title at the BGC Thailand LPGA Masters, the season-ending tournament of the Thai LPGA Tour. She earned Epson Tour membership for the 2022 season by completing 72 holes at Stage II of the LPGA Final Qualifying Tournament.

=== 2022 ===
In October, Boonchant recorded her first Epson Tour victory at the season-ending Epson Tour Championship.

Boonchant made 13 cuts in 16 starts during her rookie season on the Epson Tour and finished 13th on the money list. She finished tied for 21st at the LPGA Q-Series to earn her LPGA Tour membership for the 2023 season.

=== 2023–2025 ===
In 2023, Boonchant played 25 events on the LPGA Tour, making 14 cuts and earning $233,639 to finish 94th on the money list. She recorded two top-ten finishes, with a season-best result of tied for seventh at the Dana Open.

In 2024, she competed in 13 events, making eight cuts and earning $74,526 to finish 146th on the money list. She recorded two top-10 finishes, including a season-best tied for eighth at the Dow Championship with playing partner Chanettee Wannasaen.

In 2025, Boonchant played eight events, making three cuts and earning $66,638 to finish 143rd on the money list. Her best result was a tied for 14th at the Dow Championship.

=== 2026 ===
On 1 February, Boonchant won the Indonesia Women's Open on the Ladies Asian Tour, coming from behind with a final-round 66 to finish at 13-under-par.

On 24 May, Boonchant won the E1 Charity Open on the LPGA of Korea Tour, closing with a two-under-par 70 to finish at 10-under-par 206, two strokes ahead of Lee Yool-lin. The victory made her the first Thai player to win on the tour.

== Amateur wins ==
- 2016 ANNIKA Invitational

== Professional wins (5) ==
=== LPGA of Korea Tour wins (1) ===
No.	Date	Tournament	Winning score	To par	Margin of victory	Runner-up
1	24 May 2026	E1 Charity Open	69-67-70=206	−10	2 strokes	(South Korea) Lee Yool-lyn

=== Epson Tour wins (1) ===
No.	Date	Tournament	Winning score	To par	Margin of victory	Runner-up
1	9 Oct 2022	Epson Tour Championship	67-64-68-66=265	−23	1 stroke	(United States) Riley Rennell

=== Ladies Asian Tour wins (1) ===
No.	Date	Tournament	Winning score	To par	Margin of victory	Runners-up
1	1 Feb 2026	Indonesia Women's Open^{1}	68-69-66=203	−13	2 strokes	(Thailand) Prim Prachanakorn (a), (South Korea) Kim Seo-yoon

^{1}Co-sanctioned by the KLPGA Dream Tour

=== Thai LPGA Tour wins (2) ===
No.	Date	Tournament	Winning score	To par	Margin of victory	Runner-up	Winner's share (฿)
1	3 Dec 2021	BGC Thailand LPGA Masters	68-68-68=204	−12	1 stroke	(Thailand) Chanettee Wannasaen	600,000
2	24 Jul 2026	Singha-NSDF Ladies Open	64-69-70=203	−13	1 stroke	(Thailand) Nattarika Sensai	200,000

== Results in LPGA majors ==
Tournament	2023	2024	2025	2026
Chevron Championship				
U.S. Women's Open	CUT			CUT
Women's PGA Championship	CUT			
The Evian Championship	CUT			
Women's British Open	T50			

Did not play

CUT = missed the half-way cut
"T" = tied

== Team appearances ==
Amateur

- Arnold Palmer Cup (representing the International team): 2018
