= Debbie Dowling =

English professional golfer (1962–2019)

Personal information
- Full name: Deborah Ann Dowling
- Nationality: England
- Born: 26 July 1962
- Died: 18 January 2019 (aged 56)

Career
- Sport: Golf
- Status: Professional
- Former tour: Ladies European Tour (1981–1998)
- Professional wins: 8

Number of wins by tour
- Ladies European Tour: 6
- Ladies Asian Golf Tour: 2

Deborah Ann Dowling (26 July 1962 – 18 January 2019) was an English professional golfer who played on the Ladies European Tour.

== Career ==
Dowling represented England at the 1979 Girls Home Internationals. She turned professional and joined the Ladies European Tour (LET) in 1981 and won six times, at the 1983 Melcade International Tournament and the Ladies Jersey Open, the 1985 Portuguese Ladies Open, the 1986 Laing Ladies Classic and the 1986 and the 1989 Eastleigh Classic. She also won the 1989 Thailand Open and the 1996 Singapore Open on the Ladies Asian Golf Tour. In 1985 and 1986, she finished fifth on the LET Order of Merit. She played on tour for 18 years, until 1998.

== Professional wins (8) ==
=== Ladies European Tour wins (6) ===
- 1983 (2) Colt Cars Jersey Open, Melcade International Tournament
- 1985 (1) Vale do Lobo Portuguese Ladies Open
- 1986 (1) Bloor Homes Eastleigh Classic, Laing Ladies Classic
- 1989 (1) Bloor Homes Eastleigh Classic

=== Ladies Asian Golf Tour wins (2) ===
- 1989 Thailand Ladies Open
- 1996 Singapore Ladies Open
