= Indonesia Women's Open =

Professional golf tournament

Tournament information
- Location: Indonesia
- Established: 1987
- Course: Damai Indah Golf
- Par: 72
- Tour(s): Ladies Asian Tour; KLPGA Dream Tour; Ladies Asian Golf Tour; Ladies Asia Golf Circuit
- Format: Stroke play
- Prize fund: $600,000

Current champion
- (Thailand) Jaravee Boonchant

The Indonesia Women's Open is a professional golf tournament in Indonesia on the Ladies Asian Tour.

== History ==
The event was first played as the Indonesia Ladies Open on the Ladies Asia Golf Circuit in 1987. The last LAGT event was held in 2012 and women's professional golf did not return to Indonesia until the Simone Asia Pacific Cup in 2022.

In 2010, South Korea's Solar Lee celebrated her first professional victory at the event in Bali. In 2012, Kelly Tan of Malaysia, while still an amateur, lead the tournament ahead of the final round after rounds of 71 and 69, and finished solo third.

== Winners ==
Ladies Asian Tour and KLPGA Dream Tour event (2025–)

Year	Venue	Winner	Winning score	Margin of victory	Runner(s)-up	Prize fund	WWGR points	Ref
Indonesia Women's Open
2026	Damai Indah Golf	(Thailand) Jaravee Boonchant	203 (−13)	2 strokes	(South Korea) Kim Seo-yoon2 (Thailand) Prim Prachnakorn (a)	$600,000	3.80	
2025	Damai Indah Golf	(South Korea) Hwang Yoo-na	206 (−10)	Playoff	(South Korea) Cho Jeong-min	$300,000	4.00	

Ladies Asian Golf Tour event (2010–2012)

Year	Venue	Winner	Winning score	Margin of victory	Runner-up	Prize fund
Enjoy Jakarta Ladies Indonesia Open
2012	Palm Hill Golf Club	(Thailand) Patcharajutar Kongkraphan	209 (−7)	3 strokes	(Chinese Taipei) Hsieh Yu-ling	$200,000
2011	No tournament					
Ladies Indonesia Open
2010	New Kuta Golf Bali	(South Korea) Solar Lee	214 (−2)	1 stroke	(Japan) Mina Nakayama	$200,000

Ladies Asian Golf Circuit event (1987–2003)

- 2003 (Japan) Akane Takagi
- 2002 (Japan) Momoyo Yamazaki
- 2001 (Chinese Taipei) Yun-Jye Wei
- 2000 (South Korea) Kang Soo-yun
- 1999 (South Korea) Park Hee-jung
- 1998 (Germany) Tina Fischer
- 1997 (Sweden) Pernilla Sterner
- 1996 (Australia) Corinne Dibnah
- 1995 (England) Lisa Hackney
- 1994 (United States) Tracy Hanson
- 1993 (United States) Kim Lasken
- 1992 (Japan) Yuka Irie
- 1991 (Chinese Taipei) Li Wen-Lin
- 1990 (United States) Leigh Ann Mills
- 1989 (Sweden) Sofia Grönberg-Whitmore
- 1988 (Australia) Elizabeth Wilson
- 1987 (Japan) Fusako Nagata

== See also ==
- Indonesia Open
