= Inkster Award =

Collegiate golf award

- Awarded for: Highest ranked final year NCAA women's golfer
- Country: United States
- Presented by: Women's Golf Coaches Association

History
- Most recent: Megha Ganne, Stanford University
- Next ceremony: May 2027
- Website: official site

The Inkster Award is an annual award recognizing the highest ranked women's collegiate golfer in her final year of NCAA eligibility. The award is presented by the Women's Golf Coaches Association (WGCA).

The award is meant to shine a light on an NCAA senior who commits a full college career to her team, and is named after Juli Inkster, a World Golf Hall of Fame member who was a three-time All-American while at San Jose State University from 1979 to 1982. Inkster waited to turn professional until finishing her four-year commitment to her school, collecting 17 individual titles during her college career.

In 2025, the Division I Inkster Award winner received $50,000 and sponsor invitations to the Meijer LPGA Classic and the Portland Classic, plus a two-day mentorship retreat with Juli Inkster, and automatic advance to the second stage of LPGA Q-School.

== Recipients ==
=== Division I ===
Year	Winner	College
2026	(United States) Megha Ganne	Stanford University
2025	(Spain) Carolina López-Chacarra	Wake Forest University
2024	(Sweden) Ingrid Lindblad	Louisiana State University
2023	(United States) Jenny Bae	University of Georgia
2022	(Malaysia) Natasha Oon	San Jose State University
2021	(Thailand) Jaravee Boonchant	Duke University
2020	(United States) Natalie Srinivasan	Furman University

=== Division II ===
Year	Winner	College
2025	(United States) Madison Murr	California State University, San Marcos
2024	(United States) Julia Garcia	Dallas Baptist University
2023	(Germany) Katharina Hesse	Rollins College
2022	(Sweden) Alice Götbring	Barry University
2021	(Germany) Helen Tamy Kreuzer	Lynn University
2020	(Finland) Kiira Riihijärvi	University of Tampa

=== Division III ===
Year	Winner	College
2025	(United States) Sydney Kuo	Washington University in St. Louis
2024	(United States) Alison Takamiya	George Fox University
2023	(United States) Hannah Jugar	University of Redlands
2022	(United States) Jillian Drinkard	Methodist University
2021	(United States) Paige Church	Methodist University
2020	(United States) Alyssa Akiyama	Carleton College

== See also ==
- List of sports awards honoring women
