= Beverley New =

English professional golfer

Personal information
- Full name: Beverley Jayne New
- Nationality: England
- Born: 1960 (age 65–66) Bath, Somerset, England

Career
- Sport: Golf
- Turned professional: 1984 reinstated amateur c. 1997; 2012
- Former tour: Ladies European Tour
- Professional wins: 4

Number of wins by tour
- Ladies European Tour: 2
- Ladies Asian Golf Tour: 2

Beverley New (born 1960) is an English professional golfer who played on the Ladies European Tour.

== Amateur career ==
New had a successful amateur career and was runner-up 1979 Welsh Women's Open Stroke Play Championship, before winning the 1980 English Women's Amateur Championship, 3 and 2, over Julie Walter. She was the stroke-play medalist at the 1983 British Ladies Amateur, and between 1980 and 2007 she won the Somerset Ladies' Championship eight times.

Representing her National Team, she was part of the Great Britain and Ireland team that was victorious over Europe at Woodhall Spa Golf Club in the 1983 Vagliano Trophy. The following year she was a member of the Curtis Cup squad that was narrowly beaten by the United States at Muirfield.

New won the 1982 United Friendly Insurance Championship on the Ladies European Tour while still an amateur.

== Professional career ==
New turned professional in June 1984 and joined the Ladies European Tour. She was runner-up at the 1986 McEwan's Wirral Classic behind Laura Davies and the 1987 Ulster Volkswagen Classic behind Dale Reid, before winning the 1988 Broadway Wirral Classic, three strokes ahead of Cathy Panton.

She also played on the Ladies Asian Golf Tour, where she won the 1987 Thailand Ladies Open and the 1988 Malaysia Ladies Open.

New spent 13 years as a touring professional before being reinstated as an amateur. She captained the England Women's Home Internationals team for two years, and won the 2010 Women's Senior Amateur at West Kilbride, before turning professional for a second time in the summer of 2012 to become a teaching pro.

== Amateur wins ==
- 1980 English Women's Amateur Championship
- 2010 Women's Senior Amateur

== Professional wins (4) ==
=== Ladies European Tour wins (2) ===
No.	Date	Tournament	Winning score	Margin of victory	Runner-up	Ref
1	18 Jun 1982	United Friendly Insurance Championship (as an amateur)	212 (−1)	2 strokes	(England) Jenny Lee Smith	
2	5 Jun 1988	Broadway Wirral Classic	283 (−13)	3 strokes	(Scotland) Cathy Panton	

=== Ladies Asian Tour wins (2) ===
- 1987 Thailand Ladies Open
- 1988 Malaysia Ladies Open

== Team appearances ==
Amateur

- Women's Home Internationals (representing England): 1980, 1981, 1982 (winners), 1983
- European Ladies' Team Championship (representing England): 1983
- Vagliano Trophy (representing Great Britain & Ireland): 1983 (winners)
- Curtis Cup (representing Great Britain & Ireland): 1984
