= Saranporn Langkulgasettrin =

Thai professional golfer

Personal information
- Nationality: Thailand
- Born: 9 December 1999 (age 26) Phuket, Thailand
- Height: 166 cm (5 ft 5 in)

Career
- Sport: Golf
- Turned professional: 2015
- Current tour: LPGA of Japan Tour (joined 2019)
- Professional wins: 16

Number of wins by tour
- LPGA of Japan Tour: 1
- WPGA Tour of Australasia: 1
- Other: 14

Best results in LPGA major championships
- Chevron Championship: DNP
- Women's PGA C'ship: DNP
- U.S. Women's Open: T59: 2018
- Women's British Open: DNP
- Evian Championship: DNP

Achievements and awards
- China LPGA Tour Order of Merit: 2017, 2018
- China LPGA Tour Rookie of the year: 2017
- Thai LPGA Tour Order of Merit: 2016

Saranporn Langkulgasettrin (Thai: ศรัณย์พร ลางคุลเกษตริน; born: 9 December 1999) is a Thai professional golfer playing on the LPGA of Japan Tour.

== Early life ==
Saranporn was born on 9 December 1999 in Phuket, Thailand. She started playing golf at the age of 9 years old.

== Professional career ==
Saranporn turned professional in 2015 at the age of 15. In her rookie professional season, she recorded three victories on the All Thailand Golf Tour. In December 2016, she earned her first international title at the ICTSI Philippines Ladies Masters on the Taiwan LPGA Tour. She later secured membership on the China LPGA Tour for the 2017 season after finishing third at its qualifying tournament.

In June 2017, Saranporn claimed her first China LPGA Tour victory at the Wuhan Challenge. She added two further China LPGA Tour titles that season, winning the CLPGA Zhuhai Heritage and the PTT Thailand LPGA Masters. Following her performances in 2017, she won the China LPGA Tour Order of Merit and Rookie of the Year awards, and earned entry into the 2018 U.S. Women's Open.

In 2018, Saranporn played eight events on the China LPGA Tour and won two more titles, at the Sun Car Zhangjiagang Shuangshan Challenge and the EFG Hong Kong Ladies Open. At the 2018 U.S. Women's Open, she made the cut and finished tied for 59th. She also won the China LPGA Tour Order of Merit for the second consecutive year.

In 2019, Saranporn competed on the LPGA of Japan Tour and earned her first victory in Japan at the Nipponham Ladies Classic.

== Professional wins (16) ==
=== LPGA of Japan Tour wins (1) ===
No.	Date	Tournament	Winning score	To par	Margin of victory	Runners-up
1	14 Jul 2019	Nipponham Ladies Classic	69-65-72-67=273	−15	3 strokes	(Japan) Mone Inami (Japan) Yui Kawamoto

=== China LPGA Tour wins (5) ===
- 2017 (3) Wuhan Challenge, CLPGA Zhuhai Heritage, PTT Thailand LPGA Masters^
- 2018 (2) Sun Car Zhangjiagang Shuangshan Challenge, EFG Hong Kong Ladies Open†

^ Co-sanctioned by the ALPG Tour and Thai LPGA Tour.
† Co-sanctioned by the Taiwan LPGA Tour and Ladies Asian Golf Tour.

=== Taiwan LPGA Tour wins (3) ===
- 2016 (1) ICTSI Philippines Ladies Masters
- 2017 (1) Kenda Tires TLPGA Open
- 2018 (1) EFG Hong Kong Ladies Open^

^ Co-sanctioned by the China LPGA Tour and Ladies Asian Golf Tour.

=== Thai LPGA Tour wins (2) ===
- 2016 (1) 8th Singha-SAT Thai LPGA Championship
- 2017 (1) PTT Thailand LPGA Masters^

^ Co-sanctioned by the China LPGA Tour and ALPG Tour.

=== All Thailand Golf Tour wins (7) ===
- 2015 (2) Singha Open, All Thailand Premier Championship - Road to Singha Masters
- 2016 (3) Singha Classic, Singha Championship, All Thailand Premier Championship - Road to Singha Masters
- 2017 (2) Singha Phuket Open, Singha Chiang Mai Open

== Results in LPGA majors ==
Results not in chronological order.

Tournament	2018	2019
The Chevron Championship		
U.S. Women's Open	T59	CUT
Women's PGA Championship		
The Evian Championship		
Women's British Open		

Did not play

CUT = missed the half-way cut
"T" = tied
