= Nontaya Srisawang =

Thai professional golfer

Nontaya Srisawang นนทยา ศรีสว่าง
Personal information
- Full name: Nontaya Srisawang
- Nationality: Thailand
- Born: 15 December 1987 (age 38) Chiang Mai, Thailand
- Height: 1.68 m (5 ft 6 in)

Career
- Sport: Golf
- Turned professional: 2008
- Current tours: Thai LPGA Tour; China LPGA Tour; Taiwan LPGA Tour
- Former tours: LPGA Tour; Ladies European Tour; Epson Tour
- Professional wins: 12

Number of wins by tour
- Ladies Asian Golf Tour: 3
- Other: 9

Best results in LPGA major championships
- Chevron Championship: CUT (2017)
- Women's PGA C'ship: CUT (2016, 2017)
- U.S. Women's Open: CUT (2015)
- Women's British Open: CUT (2013, 2014, 2016)
- Evian Championship: CUT (2016)

Achievements and awards
- Thai LPGA Tour Order of Merit: 2012
Medal record
Women's golf
Representing Thailand
SEA Games
Gold medal – first place	2005 Manila	Individual
Gold medal – first place	2005 Manila	Team

Nontaya Srisawang (Thai: นนทยา ศรีสว่าง; born 15 December 1987) is a Thai professional golfer who has competed on the LPGA Tour, the Ladies European Tour, the Taiwan LPGA Tour, and the Thai LPGA Tour. She won the Thai LPGA Tour Order of Merit in 2012 and has recorded multiple professional victories across regional tours.

== Early life and amateur career ==
Srisawang was born in Chiang Mai, Thailand, and began playing golf at the age of 12.

As an amateur, she represented Thailand in several international competitions. In 2004, she was the individual runner-up at the Queen Sirikit Cup, the Asia-Pacific Amateur Ladies Golf Team Championship. At the 2005 SEA Games held in the Philippines, Srisawang won gold medals in both the women's individual and team events. In December 2005, she won the Phuket Thailand Ladies Masters on the Ladies Asian Golf Tour while still playing as an amateur, finishing at three-under-par 213 and defeating Park Hee-young by one stroke.

== Professional career ==
Srisawang turned professional in 2008 and became a rookie on the LPGA Tour in 2009. That same year, she claimed her first professional win at the Singha Masters on the All Thailand Golf Tour. In 2010, she tied for 18th at the Honda LPGA Thailand. Later that year, she finished runner-up at the Hero Honda Women's Indian Open on the Ladies European Tour, losing a four-player playoff to Laura Davies on the first extra hole.

In April 2011, Srisawang tied for third at the Shanghai Classic, the opening event of the China LPGA Tour, and earned a full playing card for the tour. In 2012, she topped the Thai LPGA Tour Order of Merit after winning multiple domestic events. She also won the 2012 Thailand Ladies Open on the Ladies Asian Golf Tour.

Srisawang later won the TLPGA & Royal Open in Taiwan in 2014 and successfully defended the title in 2015.

Between 2012 and 2015, Srisawang made 55 starts on the Ladies European Tour. She represented Thailand with Ariya Jutanugarn at the Mission Hills World Ladies Championship in China, where they finished third in the 2013 team competition. Individually on the LET, she tied for fifth at the 2014 Tenerife Open de Espana Femenino.

She regained LPGA Tour membership for the 2016 season after finishing tied for 10th at the 2015 LPGA Final Qualifying Tournament. Over her LPGA Tour career, she made 60 starts, with a career-best finish of tied eighth at the 2016 Manulife LPGA Classic in Canada.

Srisawang also competed on the Epson Tour. In 2018, she recorded four top-five finishes and finished 23rd on the money list. She has two career runner-up finishes on the tour. She has also appeared in several major championships, including the 2015 U.S. Women's Open, for which she qualified through a sectional qualifier in New Jersey.

== Later career and administrative role ==
Srisawang subsequently began competing in domestic tournaments under the name Nanon Srisawang (Thai: ณนน ศรีสว่าง).

At age 36, she won the Singha Soda Color Tour event at Gassan Panorama Golf Club in August 2024. She also serves on the Executive Committee of the Thailand Ladies Professional Golf Association, holding the position of Director of Tournament for the 2024–2028 term.

== Professional wins (12) ==
=== Ladies Asian Golf Tour wins (3) ===
No.	Date	Tournament	Winning score	To par	Margin of victory	Runner-up	Ref.
1	17 Dec 2005	Phuket Thailand Ladies Masters (as an amateur)	73-68-72=213	−3	1 stroke	(South Korea) Park Hee-young	
2	10 Feb 2012	Thailand Ladies Open	71-71-65=207	−9	1 stroke	(South Korea) Lee Eun-kyoung	
3	19 Jan 2014	TLPGA & Royal Open^{1}	71-69-68=208	−8	2 strokes	(Taiwan) Phoebe Yao	

^{1} Co-sanctioned by the Taiwan LPGA Tour.

=== Taiwan LPGA Tour wins (2) ===
No.	Date	Tournament	Winning score	To par	Margin of victory	Runner(s)-up	Ref.
1	19 Jan 2014	TLPGA & Royal Open^{1}	71-69-68=208	−8	2 strokes	(Taiwan) Phoebe Yao	
2	1 Feb 2015	TLPGA & Royal Open	70-70-71=211	−5	Playoff	(United States) Tiffany Tavee	

^{1}Co-sanctioned by the Ladies Asian Golf Tour

=== All Thailand Golf Tour wins (1) ===
- 2009 (1) Singha Masters

=== Thai LPGA Tour wins (6) ===
- 2009 (1) Thai Summit TLPGA Championship
- 2010 (1) 1st SAT-TLPGA Championship
- 2012 (3) 2nd Singha-SAT Thai LPGA Championship, 3rd Singha-SAT Thai LPGA Championship, 4th Singha-SAT Thai LPGA Championship
- 2013 (1) 2nd Singha-SAT Thai LPGA Championship

=== Other wins (1) ===
- 2024 (1) Singha Soda Color Tour at Gassan

== Playoff record ==
Ladies European Tour playoff record (0–1)

No.	Year	Tournament	Opponents	Result
1	2010	Women's Indian Open	(South Africa) Tandi Cuningham (England) Laura Davies (Sweden) Louise Friberg	Davies won with birdie on the first extra hole

== Results in LPGA majors ==
Tournament	2013	2014	2015	2016	2017
ANA Inspiration					CUT
Women's PGA Championship				CUT	CUT
U.S. Women's Open			CUT		
Women's British Open	CUT	CUT		CUT	
The Evian Championship				CUT	

Did not play

CUT = missed the half-way cut

== Team appearances ==
Professional

- World Ladies Championship (representing Thailand): 2013, 2014

Amateur

- Queen Sirikit Cup (representing Thailand): 2003, 2004
