= Suzhou Taihu Ladies Open =

Golf tournament on the Ladies European Tour in China

Tournament information
- Location: Suzhou, China
- Established: 2008
- Course: Suzhou Taihu International Golf Club
- Par: 72
- Length: 6,018 yards (5,503 m)
- Tours: Ladies European Tour; Ladies Asian Golf Tour
- Format: Stroke play
- Prize fund: €350,000
- Month played: May
- Final year: 2013

Final champion
- Location in China Location in Jiangsu

The Suzhou Taihu Ladies Open was a professional golf tournament on the Ladies European Tour (LET) and Ladies Asian Golf Tour (LAGT) held in Suzhou, China.

== History ==
The first LET event to be held in China, it was played at the Suzhou Taihu International Golf Club near Shanghai. The 54-hole tournament was founded in 2008, and was held until 2013.

The inaugural event was won by Annika Sörenstam, and having retired from professional golf at the end of the season, it turned out to be her last victory.

== Winners ==
| Year | Dates | Champion | Score | To par | Margin of victory | Runner(s)-up | Purse (€) | Winner's share (€) |
|---|---|---|---|---|---|---|---|---|
| 2013 | Nov 1–3 | (France) Gwladys Nocera | 201 | −15 | 2 strokes | (Spain) Carlota Ciganda | 350,000 | 52,500 |
| 2012 | Oct 26–28 | (Spain) Carlota Ciganda | 199 | −17 | 7 strokes | (Germany) Caroline Masson | 350,000 | 52,500 |
| 2011 | Oct 28–30 | (Taiwan) Yani Tseng | 200 | −16 | 7 strokes | (Sweden) Pernilla Lindberg | 300,000 | 45,000 |
| 2010 | Oct 29–31 | (South Africa) Lee-Anne Pace | 211 | −5 | Playoff (Note: Pace won the four-way sudden death playoff with a birdie on the second hole) | (Paraguay) Julieta Granada (Netherlands) Christel Boeljon (United States) Hannah Jun | 200,000 | 30,000 |
| 2009 | Oct 30 – Nov 1 | (South Korea) Suh Bo-mi | 210 | −6 | 1 stroke | (France) Gwladys Nocera | 200,000 | 30,000 |
| 2008 | Oct 31 – Nov 2 | (Sweden) Annika Sörenstam | 203 | −13 | Playoff (Note: Sörenstam defeated Ye on the second playoff hole) | (China) Ye Li-ying | 200,000 | 30,000 |
