= 2010 Ladies European Tour =

Golf tournament series

2010 Ladies European Tour season
- Duration: February 2010 – December 2010
- Number of official events: 26
- Most wins: 5 (tie): (England) Laura Davies (South Africa) Lee-Anne Pace
- Order of Merit: (South Africa) Lee-Anne Pace
- Player of the Year: (South Africa) Lee-Anne Pace
- Rookie of the Year: (South Korea) In-Kyung Kim
- Lowest stroke average: (Norway) Suzann Pettersen

The 2010 Ladies European Tour was a series of golf tournaments for elite female golfers from around the world which took place from February through December 2010. The tournaments were sanctioned by the Ladies European Tour (LET).

The tour featured 25 official money events, as well as the European Nations Cup. Lee-Anne Pace won the Order of Merit with earnings of €339,517.77, ahead of Laura Davies. In-Kyung Kim won Rookie of the Year honours, after finishing 4th in the Order of Merit.

== Schedule ==
The table below shows the 2010 schedule. The numbers in brackets after the winners' names show the number of career wins they had on the Ladies European Tour up to and including that event. This is only shown for members of the tour.

Key

Major championships
LET majors in **bold**
Regular events
Team championships

Date	Tournament	Host country	Winner	Purse (€)	Other tours (Note: ALPG − ALPG Tour, KLPGA − LPGA of Korea Tour, LAGT − Ladies Asian Golf Tour, LPGA − LPGA Tour.)	Notes
28 Feb	New Zealand Women's Open	New Zealand	(England) Laura Davies (40)	200,000	ALPG	
7 Mar	ANZ Ladies Masters	Australia	(Australia) Karrie Webb (n/a)	A$500,000	ALPG	
14 Mar	Women's Australian Open	Australia	(Taiwan) Yani Tseng (n/a)	A$600,000	ALPG	
20 Mar	Lalla Meryem Cup	Morocco	(Germany) Anja Monke (3)	275,000		
25 Apr	European Nations Cup	Spain	(Sweden) Anna Nordqvist (1) and Sophie Gustafson (14)	350,000		Team event; Unofficial prize money
9 May	Turkish Airlines Ladies Open	Turkey	(England) Melissa Reid (1)	250,000		
16 May	UniCredit Ladies German Open	Germany	(England) Laura Davies (41)	330,000		
30 May	Allianz Ladies Slovak Open	Slovakia	(Spain) María Hernández (1)	350,000		
6 Jun	ABN AMRO Ladies Open	Netherlands	(England) Florentyna Parker (1)	250,000		
20 Jun	Deutsche Bank Ladies Swiss Open	Switzerland	(South Africa) Lee-Anne Pace (1)	525,000		
27 Jun	Ladies Open of Portugal	Portugal	(Australia) Karen Lunn (9)	300,000		
4 Jul	Tenerife Ladies Open	Spain	(England) Trish Johnson (16)	275,000		
25 Jul	**Evian Masters**	France	(South Korea) Jiyai Shin (n/a)	$3,250,000	LPGA	
1 Aug	**Ricoh Women's British Open**	England	(Taiwan) Yani Tseng (n/a)	$2,500,000	LPGA	
8 Aug	AIB Ladies Irish Open	Ireland	(Sweden) Sophie Gustafson (15)	500,000		
15 Aug	S4C Wales Ladies Championship of Europe	Wales	(South Africa) Lee-Anne Pace (2)	£300,000		
20 Aug	Ladies Scottish Open	Scotland	(France) Virginie Lagoutte-Clément (3)	200,000		
29 Aug	Finnair Masters	Finland	(South Africa) Lee-Anne Pace (3)	200,000		
5 Sep	UNIQA Ladies Golf Open	Austria	(England) Laura Davies (42)	200,000		
12 Sep	Open de France Feminin	France	(England) Trish Johnson (17)	250,000		
19 Sep	Open De España Femenino	Spain	(England) Laura Davies (43)	350,000		
24 Oct	Sanya Ladies Open	China	(South Africa) Lee-Anne Pace (4)	200,000	LAGT	New tournament
31 Oct	Suzhou Taihu Ladies Open	China	(South Africa) Lee-Anne Pace (5)	200,000	LAGT	
7 Nov	Daishin Securities-Tomato M Korea-European Ladies Masters	South Korea	(South Korea) Kim Hyun-ji (2)	$400,000	KLPGA	
13 Nov	Hero Honda Women's Indian Open	India	(England) Laura Davies (44)	$300,000	LAGT	
11 Dec	Omega Dubai Ladies Masters	United Arab Emirates	(Denmark) Iben Tinning (6)	500,000		

== Order of Merit rankings ==
Rank	Player	Country	Earnings
1	Lee-Anne Pace	South Africa	€339,517.77
2	Laura Davies	England	€311,573.48
3	Melissa Reid	England	€270,871.59
4	In-Kyung Kim	South Korea	€193,154.69
5	Iben Tinning	Denmark	€163,562.50
6	Virginie Lagoutte-Clément	France	€153,526.09
7	Suzann Pettersen	Norway	€149,489.66
8	Florentyna Parker	England	€145,240.36
9	Trish Johnson	England	€139,924.93
10	Vikki Laing	Scotland	€126,733.57

== Location of tournaments ==
Location of tournaments in Europe.
Major championship
National open
Regular event
Team event
Location of tournaments outside Europe.
National open
Regular event
