= Thailand Ladies Open =

Golf tournament in Thailand

Tournament information
- Location: Thailand
- Established: 1987
- Course(s): Siam Country Club, Plantation Course
- Par: 72
- Tour(s): Ladies Asia Golf Circuit (1987–2003); Ladies European Tour (2005); Ladies Asian Golf Tour (2006–2013)
- Format: Stroke play
- Prize fund: US$175,000
- Final year: 2013

Final champion
- (Thailand) Sherman Santiwiwatthanaphong (a)

The Thailand Ladies Open was a women's professional golf tournament held in Thailand. It was first played in 1987 as part of the Ladies Asia Golf Circuit. The tournament was later played on the Ladies European Tour in 2005 and on the Ladies Asian Golf Tour from 2006 to 2013.

== History ==
The first event was held at the inception of the Ladies Asia Golf Circuit in 1987. The 2011 event required a long playoff between Cho A-ram and Tanaporn Kongkiatkrai, with Kongkiatkrai making a birdie on the ninth playoff hole to win the title. The 26th and final edition, held in 2013, was won by Thai amateur Sherman Santiwiwatthanaphong on her 17th birthday.

== Winners ==
Year	Tour	Winner	Score	To par	Margin of victory	Runner-up	Purse (US$)	Venue	Ref.
PTT Global Chemical Thailand Ladies Open
2013	LAGT	(Thailand) Sherman Santiwiwatthanaphong (a)	70-75-68=213	−3	1 stroke	(Thailand) Pornanong Phatlum (Thailand) Ornnicha Kosunthea (a)	175,000	Siam Country Club, Plantation Course	
Thailand Ladies Open
2012	LAGT	(Thailand) Nontaya Srisawang	71-71-65=207	−9	1 stroke	(South Korea) Lee Eun-kyoung	175,000	Lakewood CC	
2011	LAGT	(Thailand) Tanaporn Kongkiatkrai	69-70-69=208	−8	Playoff	(South Korea) Cho A-ram	135,000	Lakewood CC	
2010	LAGT	(South Korea) Lee Jung-min	71-69-71=211	−5	2 strokes	(Taiwan) Hsieh Yu-ling	135,000	The Vintage Club	
2009	LAGT	(Thailand) Onnarin Sattayabanphot	71-70-70=211	−5	Playoff	(South Korea) Kim Hae-jung (South Korea) Kim Hyeon-kyeong	120,000	The Vintage Club	
2008	LAGT	(Thailand) Pornanong Phatlum	65-73-70=208	−8	2 strokes	(Australia) Frances Bondad (South Korea) Kim Hae-jung	120,000	The Vintage Club	
2007	LAGT	(South Korea) Jiyai Shin	67-72-67=206	−10	10 strokes	(South Korea) Na Da-ye	100,000	Green Valley CC	
2006	LAGT	(South Korea) Park Hee-young	68-69-72=209	−7	3 strokes	(South Korea) Kim Hae-jung	100,000	Pattana Sports Club	
2005	LET	(Australia) Shani Waugh	67-71-71-73=282	−6	Playoff	(France) Gwladys Nocera	330,000	Alpine Golf Club	
2003	LAGC	(Japan) Atsuko Ueno	66-71-79=216				110,000	Chiangmai-Lumphun GC	
2002	LAGC	(United States) Nicole Jeray	68-68-71=207				120,000	Bangkok GC	
2001	LAGC	(Thailand) Naree Wongluekiet (a)	71-69-71=211				120,000	Bangkok GC	
2000	LAGC	(South Korea) Kang Soo-yun	69-72-70=211				100,000	Bangkok GC	
1999	LAGC	(Taiwan) Tai Yu Chuan	72-68-70=210				90,000	Bangkok GC	
1998	LAGC	(Taiwan) Connie Y.J. Wei (a)	74-72-70=216				100,000	Panya Park GC	
1997	LAGC	(Sweden) Sophie Gustafson	72-72-70=214				110,000	Natural Park Hill GC	
1996	LAGC	(United States) Shelly Rule	76-70-70=216				110,000	President CC	
1995	LAGC	(Canada) Liz Earley	69-75-70=214				110,000	Thana City G&CC	
1994	LAGC	(England) Laura Davies	66-70-70=206				90,000	Thana City G&CC	
1993	LAGC	(England) Laura Davies (2)	68-71-74=213				100,000	Panya Resort GC	
1992	LAGC	(Japan) Hitomi Notsu	75-72-67=214				90,000	Phuket CC	
1991	LAGC	(Australia) Mardi Lunn	70-75-69=214				80,000	Pinehurst G&CC	
1990	LAGC	(Australia) Corinne Dibnah	71-77-70=218				60,000	Green Valley CC	
1989	LAGC	(England) Deborah Dowling	76-75-68=219				50,000	Green Valley CC	
1988	LAGC	(Australia) Karen Lunn	69-70-70=209				50,000	Navatanee GC	
1987	LAGC	(England) Beverley New	70-75-78=223				30,000	Muang-Ake GC	

== See also ==
- Thailand Open
