= Philippines Ladies Open =

Women's golf tournament in the Philippines

Tournament information
- Location: Philippines
- Established: 1997
- Course: St Elena
- Par: 72
- Tour: Ladies Asia Golf Circuit
- Format: Stroke play
- Final year: 1999

Final champion
- (South Korea) Chung Il-mi

The Philippines Ladies Open was a professional golf tournament in the Philippines on the Ladies Asia Golf Circuit.

== Winners ==
Date	Winner	Country	Winning score	To par	Margin of victory	Runner-up	Ref
Philippine Ladies Open
29–31 Jan 1999	Chung Il-mi	South Korea					
Toyota Philippine Ladies Open
29–31 Jan 1998	Kristel Mourgue D'Algue	France	73-71-75=219	+3	Playoff	(Chinese Taipei) Im Chung	
6–8 Feb 1997	Pernilla Sterner	Sweden	75-68-73=216	E	1 stroke	(Sweden) Åsa Gottmo	

== See also ==
- Philippine Open
