= Singapore Ladies Open =

Golf tournament held in Singapore

Singapore Women's Open
Tournament information
- Location: Singapore
- Established: 1987
- Course: Tanah Merah CC
- Par: 72
- Tours: Ladies Asian Tour; LPGA of Korea Tour; Ladies Asian Golf Circuit (1987–1996)
- Format: Stroke play
- Prize fund: S$1,100,000

Current champion
- (South Korea) Kim Jae-hee

The Singapore Women's Open is a professional golf tournament held in Singapore. It was first played in 1987 as the Singapore Ladies Open, and is from 2022 part of the Ladies Asian Tour and LPGA of Korea Tour.

== History ==
The Singapore Ladies Open was part of the Ladies Asian Golf Circuit between 1987 and 1996. In 2020, a Singapore Ladies Open sponsored by Hana Financial Group was slated to return but was postponed due to the pandemic, and the inaugural LPGA of Korea Tour co-sanctioned event was held in 2022. With a prize purse of S$1.1 million, it was the second most lucrative women's golf tournament in the country after the S$2.4 million HSBC Women's World Championship.

== Winners ==
Ladies Asian Tour event

Year	Winner	Winning score	Margin of victory	Runner(s)-up	Prize fund	Venue	Tour(s) (Note: KLPGA − LPGA of Korea Tour; LAT − Ladies Asian Tour)	Ref
Hana Financial Group Singapore Women's Open
2024	(South Korea) Kim Jae-hee	–17 (66-68-71-66=271)	1 stroke	(South Korea) Bang Shin-sil	S$1,100,000	Tanah Merah CC	KLPGA, LAT	
2023	No tournament							
2022	(South Korea) Park Ji-young	–11 (66-67=133) (Note: Reduced to 36 holes due to weather conditions.)	1 stroke	(South Korea) Hong Jung-min (South Korea) Lee So-young (South Korea) Park Hyun-kyung	₩1,000,000,000	Tanah Merah CC	KLPGA, LAT	

Ladies Asian Golf Circuit event

Year	Winner	Country
Singapore Ladies Open
1996	Debbie Dowling	England
1995	Estefania Knuth	Spain
1994	No tournament	
1993	Janet Soulsby	England
1992	Tania Abitbol	Spain
1991	Li Wen-lin	Taiwan
1990	Evelyn Orley	Switzerland
1988	No tournament	
1988	Elizabeth Wilson	Australia
1987	Liselotte Neumann	Sweden

== See also ==
- National open golf championship
- Singapore Open
