= New Zealand Women's Open =

Golf tournament formerly on the LPGA Tour

Coordinates: 37.0193°S 174.9755°E

Tournament information
- Location: New Zealand
- Established: 2009
- Course: Windross Farm Golf Club
- Tours: ALPG Tour; LPGA Tour; Ladies European Tour
- Format: Stroke play
- Prize fund: US$1.3 million
- Final year: 2017

Final champion
- (Canada) Brooke Henderson

Location in New Zealand

The New Zealand Women's Open was a women's professional golf tournament on the ALPG Tour. It was founded in 2009 and became a co-sanctioned event on the Ladies European Tour the following year. The 2017 edition was co-sanctioned by the LPGA Tour and not the LET.

== Winners ==
Year	Tour(s) (Note: ALPG − ALPG Tour; LET − Ladies European Tour; LPGA − LPGA Tour.)	Winner	Score	To par	Margin of victory	Runner-up	Venue
McKayson New Zealand Women's Open
2017	ALPG · LPGA	(Canada) Brooke Henderson	65-70-67-69=271	−17	5 strokes	(China) Jing Yan	Windross Farm Golf Club
ISPS Handa New Zealand Women's Open
2016	ALPG · LET	(New Zealand) Lydia Ko (3)	69-67-70=206	−10	2 strokes	(England) Felicity Johnson, (South Korea) Choi Hye-jin (a) (Denmark) Nanna Koerstz Madsen	Clearwater Golf Club
2015	ALPG · LET	(New Zealand) Lydia Ko (2)	70-61-71=202	−14	4 strokes	(Australia) Hannah Green (a)	Clearwater Golf Club
2014	ALPG · LET	(South Korea) Mi Hyang Lee	72-72-63=207	−9	1 stroke	(New Zealand) Lydia Ko	Clearwater Golf Club
2013	ALPG · LET	(New Zealand) Lydia Ko (a)	70-68-68=206	−10	1 stroke	(United States) Amelia Lewis	Clearwater Golf Club
2012	ALPG · LET	(Australia) Lindsey Wright	70-68-68=206	−10	1 stroke	(Australia) Jessica Speechley, (United States) Alison Walshe	Pegasus Golf & Sports Club
Pegasus New Zealand Women's Open hosted by Christchurch
2011	ALPG · LET	(Australia) Kristie Smith	71-64-73-68=276	−12	3 strokes	(United States) Tiffany Joh, (Italy) Giulia Sergas	Pegasus Golf & Sports Club
Pegasus New Zealand Women's Open
2010	ALPG · LET	(England) Laura Davies	69-71-71-68=279	−9	2 strokes	(Sweden) Pernilla Lindberg, (Norway) Marianne Skarpnord, (Australia) Sarah Kemp	Pegasus Golf & Sports Club
New Zealand Women's Open
2009	ALPG	(France) Gwladys Nocera	71-68-69=208	−8	6 strokes	(Australia) Katherine Hull, (Australia) Nikki Garrett, (South Korea) Bobea Park, (Australia) Sarah Kemp	Clearwater Golf Club

== See also ==
- New Zealand Open
- Golf in New Zealand
- Open golf tournament
