= Jockey Club Kau Sai Chau Public Golf Course =

Golf Course in Kau Sai Chau

Coordinates: 22.366707°N 114.310262°E

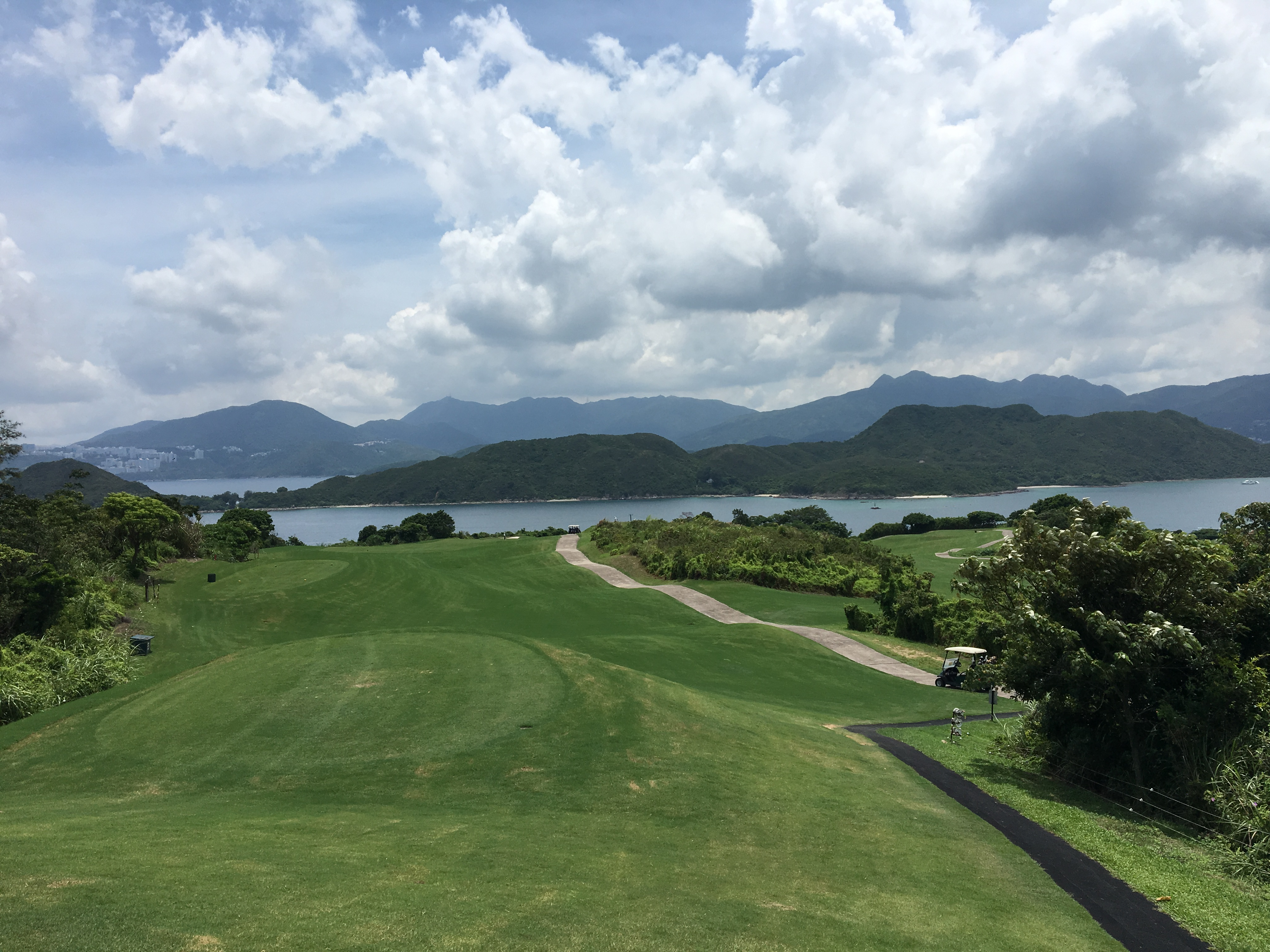
- Jockey Club Kau Sai Chau Public Golf Course
- Interactive map of Jockey Club Kau Sai Chau Public Golf Course

Club information
- Location: Kau Sai Chau, the New Territories, Hong Kong
- Established: 1995
- Type: Public
- Tota holes: 54
- Website: http://www.kscgolf.org.hk

East Course
- Designed by: Nelson & Haworth
- Par: 72
- Length: 6,640 yards

North Course
- Designed by: Gary Player
- Par: 72
- Length: 6,796 yards

South Course
- Designed by: Gary Player
- Par: 69
- Length: 5,906 yards

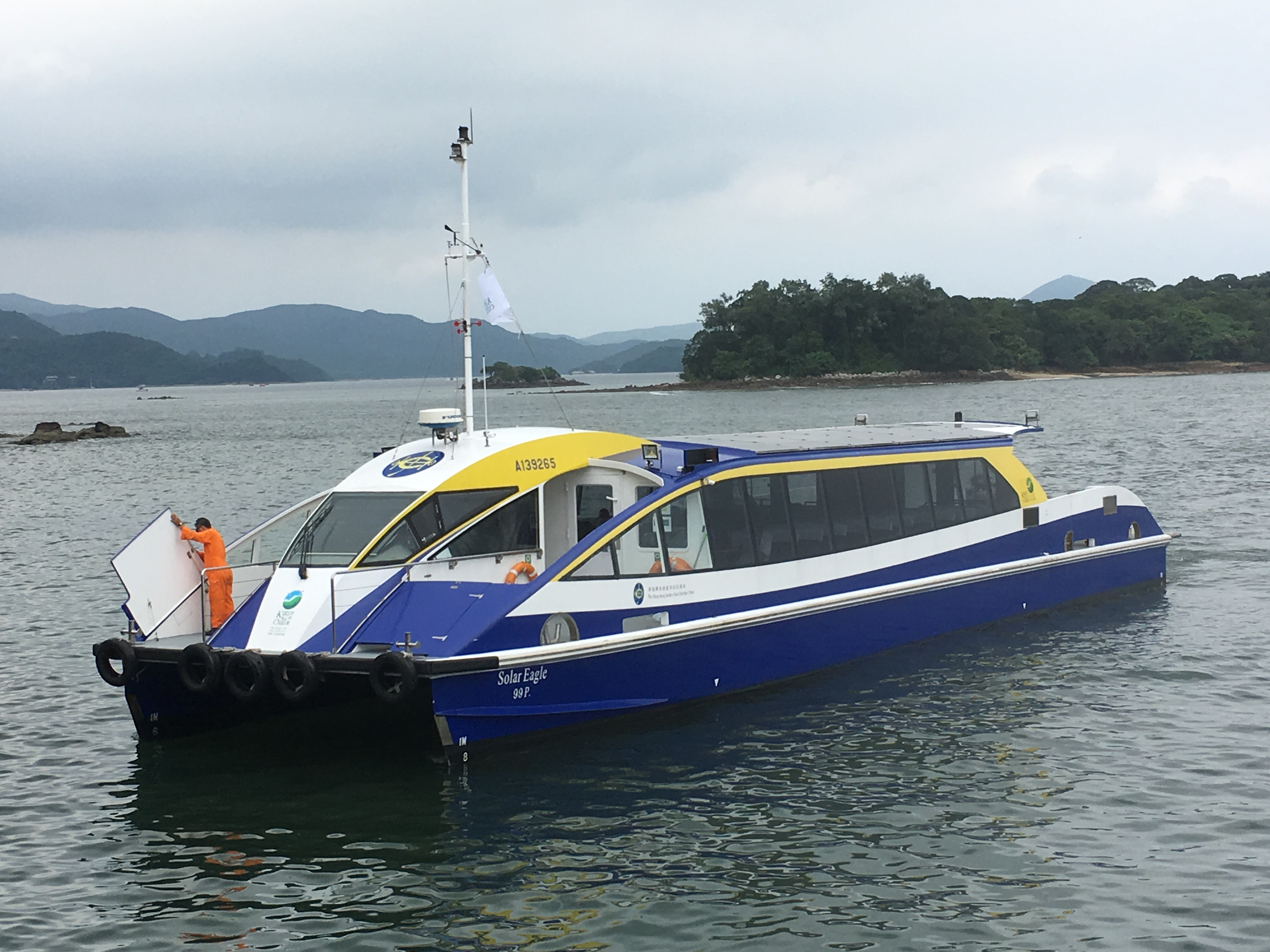
Shuttle Ferry

Jockey Club Kau Sai Chau Public Golf Course, located on the picturesque island of Kau Sai Chau off the coast of Sai Kung Peninsula just 15 kilometers away from Hong Kong's CBD, is the only public golf course in Hong Kong and one of the world's busiest golf courses.

Since it first became operational in December 1995, Kau Sai Chau Public Golf Course has expanded in size and is now equipped with three 18-hole courses covering over 250 hectare of land. The North and South Courses were designed by retired South African professional golfer Gary Player while the East Course was designed by Nelson & Haworth. Conceptualized as a community project, the Hong Kong Government loaned the land to the Hong Kong Jockey Club free of charge and the latter donated HK$500 million to build all facilities with the mission to promote the game of golf to the people of Hong Kong.
