= Tina Fischer =

German professional golfer (born 1970)

Personal information
- Full name: Martina Fischer
- Nationality: Germany
- Born: 29 September 1970 (age 56) Bad Nauheim, West Germany
- Height: 1.70 m (5 ft 7 in)

Career
- Sport: Golf
- College: University of Wiesbaden
- Turned professional: 1995
- Former tours: Ladies European Tour; LPGA Tour (1999–2006); Futures Tour
- Professional wins: 4

Number of wins by tour
- LPGA Tour: 1
- Ladies European Tour: 2
- Ladies Asian Golf Tour: 1

Best results in LPGA major championships
- Chevron Championship: T50: 2005
- Women's PGA C'ship: T63: 2005
- U.S. Women's Open: CUT: 2002
- du Maurier Classic: DNP
- Women's British Open: DNP

Martina Fischer (born 29 September 1970 in Bad Nauheim) is a German professional golfer.

== Career ==
Fischer has competed, and won tournaments, on both the Ladies European Tour and LPGA Tour.

== Amateur wins ==
- 1994 European Ladies Amateur Championship

== Professional wins (4) ==
=== LPGA Tour wins (1) ===
No.	Date	Tournament	Winning score	Margin of victory	Runners-up
1	29 Sep 2001	Asahi Ryokuken International Championship	−10 (70-66-70=206)	1 stroke	(United States) Tracy Hanson (United States) Emilee Klein

=== Ladies European Tour wins (2) ===
- 1996 McDonald's WPGA Championship of Europe
- 2000 Dutch Ladies Open

=== Ladies Asian Golf Tour wins (1) ===
- 1998 Indonesia Ladies Open

== Team appearances ==
Amateur

- Espirito Santo Trophy (representing Germany): 1988, 1990, 1994
- European Ladies' Team Championship (representing Germany): 1993
