= European Nations Cup (golf) =

International team golf tournament

The European Nations Cup was a professional team golf tournament on the Ladies European Tour that was held in Spain. It was played from 2008 to 2011, and was a stroke play competition comprising fourballs for the first and third rounds and a variation on greensomes for the second and fourth rounds. It is an unofficial event and earnings do not count on the LET official money list.

== Winners ==
Year	Dates	Venue	Winners	Players	Score	To par	Margin of victory	Runner(s)-up	Players
2011	14–17 Apr	La Sella Golf Resort	Sweden	Anna Nordqvist; Sophie Gustafson	267	−21	3 strokes	Germany	Anja Monke
2011	14–17 Apr	La Sella Golf Resort	Sweden	Anna Nordqvist; Sophie Gustafson	267	−21	3 strokes	Germany	Caroline Masson
2011	14–17 Apr	La Sella Golf Resort	Sweden	Anna Nordqvist; Sophie Gustafson	267	−21	3 strokes	England	Laura Davies
2011	14–17 Apr	La Sella Golf Resort	Sweden	Anna Nordqvist; Sophie Gustafson	267	−21	3 strokes	England	Melissa Reid
2010	22–25 Apr	La Sella Golf Resort	Sweden	Anna Nordqvist; Sophie Gustafson	267	-21	Playoff^{1}	Australia	Karrie Webb
2010	22–25 Apr	La Sella Golf Resort	Sweden	Anna Nordqvist; Sophie Gustafson	267	-21	Playoff^{1}	Australia	Karen Lunn
2009	23–26 Apr	La Sella Golf Resort	Netherlands	Christel Boeljon; Marjet van der Graaff	270	−18	4 strokes	Italy	Giulia Sergas
2009	23–26 Apr	La Sella Golf Resort	Netherlands	Christel Boeljon; Marjet van der Graaff	270	−18	4 strokes	Italy	Veronica Zorzi
2009	23–26 Apr	La Sella Golf Resort	Netherlands	Christel Boeljon; Marjet van der Graaff	270	−18	4 strokes	Australia	Joanne Mills
2009	23–26 Apr	La Sella Golf Resort	Netherlands	Christel Boeljon; Marjet van der Graaff	270	−18	4 strokes	Australia	Nikki Garrett
2009	23–26 Apr	La Sella Golf Resort	Netherlands	Christel Boeljon; Marjet van der Graaff	270	−18	4 strokes	France	Gwladys Nocera
2009	23–26 Apr	La Sella Golf Resort	Netherlands	Christel Boeljon; Marjet van der Graaff	270	−18	4 strokes	France	Anne-Lise Caudal
2008	3–6 Apr	La Sella Golf Resort	England	Trish Johnson; Rebecca Hudson	267	−21	5 strokes	Germany	Martina Eberl
2008	3–6 Apr	La Sella Golf Resort	England	Trish Johnson; Rebecca Hudson	267	−21	5 strokes	Germany	Anja Monke
2008	3–6 Apr	La Sella Golf Resort	England	Trish Johnson; Rebecca Hudson	267	−21	5 strokes	Belgium	Lara Tadiotto
2008	3–6 Apr	La Sella Golf Resort	England	Trish Johnson; Rebecca Hudson	267	−21	5 strokes	Belgium	Ellen Smets

^{1}Nordqvist and Gustafson defeated Webb and Lunn on the third playoff hole.
