= Hong Kong Ladies Open =

Golf tournament

Tournament information
- Location: Hong Kong
- Established: 2015
- Course: Hong Kong Golf Club
- Par: 72
- Tours: Taiwan LPGA Tour; China LPGA Tour; Ladies Asian Golf Tour
- Format: Stroke play
- Prize fund: $150,000
- Month played: May

Current champion
- (China) Liu Yan

Final champion
- Location in Hong Kong

The Hong Kong Ladies Open is a golf tournament on the Taiwan LPGA Tour, China LPGA Tour and Ladies Asian Golf Tour hosted in Hong Kong since 2015. It is played at the Old Course in Fanling in Hong Kong Golf Club.

In 2016, club member Tiffany Chan won the tournament in a playoff while still an amateur.

EFG became the tournament's first title sponsor in 2017. The prize money of the tournament is US$150,000 and players are offered Rolex Ranking points.

== Winners ==
Year	Winner	Country	Score	Margin of victory	Runner(s)-up	WWGR points	Ref
EFG Hong Kong Ladies Open
2020–23: No tournament due to the COVID-19 pandemic
2019	Liu Yan	China	209 (–7)	1 stroke	(China) Du Mohan (Thailand) Renuka Suksukont (China) Zhang Weiwei	4	
2018	Saranporn Langkulgasettrin	Thailand	205 (–11)	Playoff	(Chinese Taipei) Chen Szu-han	3	
2017	Supamas Sangchan	Thailand	206 (–10)	1 stroke	(Chinese Taipei) Hsieh Yu-ling (Thailand) Renuka Suksukont	2	
Hong Kong Ladies Open
2016	Tiffany Chan (a)	Hong Kong	211 (–5)	Playoff	(Thailand) Mind Muangkhumsakul	2	
2015	Lee Jeong-hwa	South Korea	213 (–3)	1 stroke	(Chinese Taipei) Chen Yu-ju (Thailand) Mind Muangkhumsakul	2	
