= Kang Soo-yun =

South Korean professional golfer (born 1976)

Kang Soo-yun 강수연
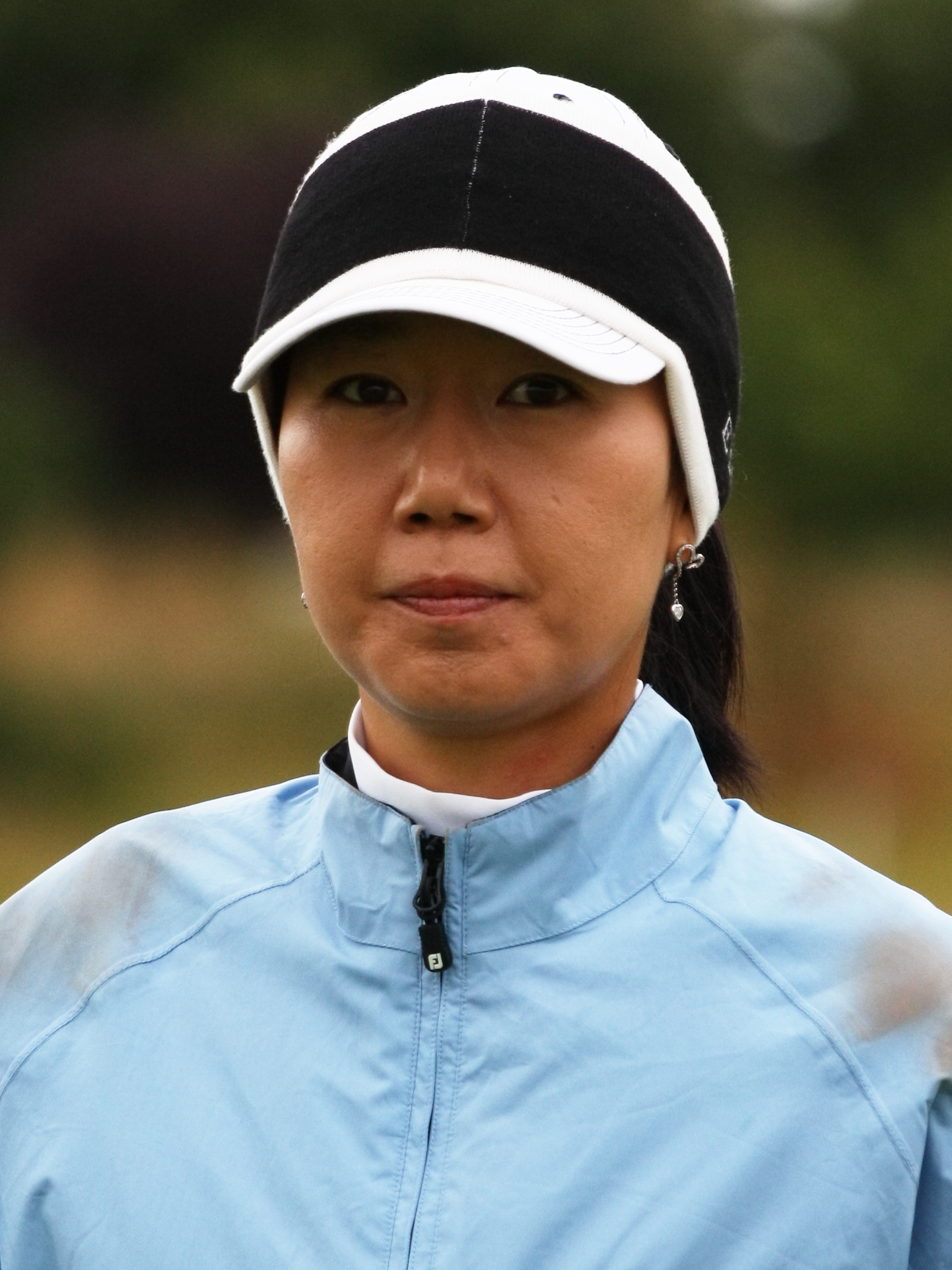
- Kang before 2009 Women's British Open

Personal information
- Nationality: South Korea
- Born: 15 March 1976 (age 50) Seoul, South Korea
- Height: 5 ft 8 in (1.73 m)

Career
- Sport: Golf
- College: Kyung-Hee University
- Turned professional: 1997
- Former tours: LPGA of Korea Tour; Futures Tour (1999-2000); LPGA Tour (joined 2003)
- Professional wins: 14

Number of wins by tour
- LPGA Tour: 1
- LPGA of Japan Tour: 3
- LPGA of Korea Tour: 8
- Ladies Asian Golf Tour: 2

Best results in LPGA major championships
- Chevron Championship: T51: 2008
- Women's PGA C'ship: T8: 2004
- U.S. Women's Open: T13: 2005
- Women's British Open: T24: 2003
Medal record
Asian Games
Silver medal – second place	1994 Hiroshima	Individual
Silver medal – second place	1994 Hiroshima	Women's team

Kang Soo-yun (Korean: 강수연; born 15 March 1976) is a South Korean professional golfer. She is often referred to as the "Fashion Model of the Fairways" for her model-like physique and clothing.

Kang was born in Seoul, South Korea. She has been playing golf since the age of 12. After years on the LPGA of Korea Tour, she moved to the LPGA Tour in 2003. She won her only LPGA tournament in 2005 at the Safeway Classic in Portland, Oregon. She has 12 other wins worldwide.

== Professional wins (14) ==
this list is incomplete

=== LPGA Tour wins (1) ===
No.	Date	Tournament	Winning score	Margin of victory	Runner-up
1	21 Aug 2005	Safeway Classic	−15 (64-68-69=201)	4 strokes	(South Korea) Jeong Jang

=== LPGA Tour of Korea wins (8) ===
this list is probably incomplete

- 2000 Korea Women's Open, Hite Ladies Open
- 2001 Korea Women's Open, Hite Ladies Open, LG Lady Card Open
- 2002 Sky Valley Kim Young-Joo Invitational, Hite Ladies Open
- 2004 PAVV Invitational

=== LPGA Tour of Japan wins (3) ===
No.	Date	Tournament	Winning score	Margin of victory	Runners-up
1	13 Oct 2013	Stanley Ladies Golf Tournament	−12 (68-70-66=204)	3 strokes	(Japan) Haru Nomura (Japan) Sakura Yokomine
2	12 Jun 2016	Suntory Ladies Open	−11 (68-64-72-73=277)	1 stroke	(Japan) Serena Aoki (South Korea) Lee Bo-mee (Japan) Yumiko Yoshida
3	28 May 2017	Resort Trust Ladies	−9 (67-72-68=207)	Playoff	(Japan) Saiki Fujita (South Korea) Jeon Mi-jeong

=== Ladies Asian Golf Tour wins (2) ===
- 2000 Indonesia Ladies Open, Malaysia Ladies Open

== Team appearances ==
Amateur

- Espirito Santo Trophy (representing South Korea): 1996 (winners)
