= Taiwan Ladies Open =

Tournament information
- Location: Taoyuan City, Taiwan
- Established: 2001
- Courses: Ta Shee Golf & Country Club
- Par: 72
- Tour: Ladies European Tour
- Format: Stroke play - 54 holes
- Prize fund: £100,000
- Month played: March
- Final year: 2001

Tournament record score
- Aggregate: 211 Raquel Carriedo
- To par: −5 as above

Final champion
- (Spain) Raquel Carriedo

The Taiwan Ladies Open was a professional golf tournament in Taiwan on the Ladies European Tour.

The 54-hole event was held at the par-72 Ta Shee Golf & Country Club in early March and played only in 2001.

== Winners ==
Year	Winner	Country	Winning score	To par	Margin of victory	Runner-up	Purse (£)	Winner's share (£)
2001	Raquel Carriedo	Spain	69-67-75=211	−5	1 stroke	(Sweden) Anna Berg (Germany) Elisabeth Esterl	100,000	15,000
