= Sanya Ladies Open =

Coordinates: 18.235°N 109.630°E

Tournament information
- Location: Sanya, China
- Established: 2010
- Course: Yalong Bay Golf Club
- Par: 72
- Tours: China LPGA Tour; Ladies Asian Golf Tour; Ladies European Tour
- Format: Stroke play
- Prize fund: €300,000
- Month played: October
- Final year: 2017

Tournament record score
- Aggregate: 203 Lee-Anne Pace (2013)
- To par: −13 as above

Final champion
- (France) Céline Boutier

Location in China

The Sanya Ladies Open was a golf tournament co-sanctioned by the China LPGA Tour, Ladies Asian Golf Tour and the Ladies European Tour from 2010 to 2017. It was played at the Yalong Bay Golf Club in Sanya, China.

== Winners ==
Year	Winner	Country	Score
2017	Céline Boutier	France	204 (−12)
2016	Supamas Sangchan	Thailand	208 (−8)
2015	Xi Yu Lin (2)	China	203 (−13)
2014	Xi Yu Lin	China	202 (−14)
2013	Lee-Anne Pace (2)	South Africa	203 (−13)
2012	Cassandra Kirkland	France	210 (−6)
2011	Frances Bondad	Australia	205 (−11)
2010	Lee-Anne Pace	South Africa	205 (−11)
