= Turkish Ladies Open =

Golf tournament in Turkey

Coordinates: 36.51°N 31.03°E

The Turkish Airlines Ladies Open was a professional golf tournament on the Ladies European Tour that was held at the National Golf Club in Belek, Antalya, Turkey. It was first played in 2008 but was cancelled the following year due to lack of sponsorship. It returned to the schedule in 2010 with Turkish Airlines sponsorship.

== Winners ==
Year	Winner	Country	Score	Margin of victory	Runner(s)-up
Turkish Airlines Ladies Open
2015	Melissa Reid	England	281 (−11)	4 strokes	(France) Gwladys Nocera
2014	Valentine Derrey	France	212 (−7)	2 strokes	(Denmark) Malene Jørgensen
2013	Lee-Anne Pace	South Africa	289 (−3)	1 stroke	(Finland) Minea Blomqvist, (Spain) Carlota Ciganda, (England) Charley Hull
2012	Christel Boeljon	Netherlands	285 (−7)	3 strokes	(Finland) Ursula Wikström
2011	Christel Boeljon	Netherlands	287 (−5)	3 strokes	(Wales) Becky Brewerton, (England) Florentyna Parker
2010	Melissa Reid	England	216 (−3)	2 strokes	(Netherlands) Christel Boeljon, (Denmark) Iben Tinning
Garanti American Express Turkish Open
2009	No tournament				
2008	Lotta Wahlin	Sweden	285 (−7)	12 strokes	(South Africa) Stacy Lee Bregman, (Spain) Paula Martí, (Sweden) Johanna Westerberg
