= 1999 Ladies European Tour =

Golf tour season

1999 Ladies European Tour season
- Duration: N/A
- Number of official events: 16
- Order of Merit: (England) Laura Davies
- Player of the Year: (England) Laura Davies
- Rookie of the Year: (England) Elaine Ratcliffe
- Lowest stroke average: (England) Laura Davies

The 1999 Ladies European Tour was a series of golf tournaments for elite female golfers from around the world which took place in 1999. The tournaments were sanctioned by the Ladies European Tour (LET).

== Tournaments ==
The table below shows the 1999 schedule. The numbers in brackets after the winners' names show the number of career wins they had on the Ladies European Tour up to and including that event. This is only shown for members of the tour.

Date	Tournament	Venue	Location	Winner	Score	Margin of victory	Runner(s)-up	Note
9 May	Royal Marie-Claire Open	Evian Resort Golf Club	France	(Italy) Silvia Cavalleri (1)	215	1 stroke	(Spain) Ana Belén Sánchez (Italy) Federica Dassù	
12 Jun	**Evian Masters**	Evian Resort Golf Club	France	(Sweden) Catrin Nilsmark (2)	279	2 strokes	(England) Laura Davies	
4 Jul	Chrysler Open	Halmstad Golf Club	Sweden	(England) Laura Davies (28)	273	8 strokes	(England) Alison Nicholas	
11 Jul	Open de France Dames	Paris International GC	France	(England) Trish Johnson (11)	282	1 stroke	(England) Alison Nicholas	
17 Jul	Austrian Ladies Open	Steiermarkischer GC Murhof	Austria	(Spain) Marina Arruti (1)	203	2 strokes	(Scotland) Dale Reid (Germany) Elisabeth Esterl	
25 Jul	stilwerk Ladies German Open	Treudelberg GC, Hamburg	Germany	(Australia) Anne-Marie Knight (1)	278	1 stroke	(England) Laura Davies (Sweden) Sophie Gustafson	
8 Aug	McDonald's WPGA Championship	Gleneagles	Scotland	(England) Laura Davies (29)	280	Playoff	(Sweden) Maria Hjorth	
15 Aug	**Weetabix Women's British Open**	Woburn Golf and Country Club	England	(United States) Sherri Steinhauer	283	1 stroke	(Sweden) Annika Sörenstam	Co-sanctioned by the LPGA Tour
22 Aug	Compaq Open	Österåkers GC	Sweden	(England) Laura Davies (30)	277	4 strokes	(Sweden) Helen Alfredsson	
30 Aug	Laura Davies Invitational	Brocket Hall	England	(Sweden) Sofia Grönberg-Whitmore (2)	275	Playoff	(England) Trish Johnson	
5 Sep	Donegal Irish Ladies Open	Letterkenny GC, County Donegal	Ireland	(France) Sandrine Mendiburu (2)	286	Playoff	(Spain) Raquel Carriedo (England) Laura Davies (Germany) Elisabeth Esterl	
19 Sep	Ladies Hannover Expo 2000 Open	Rethmar GC, Hannover	Germany	(France) Sandrine Mendiburu (3)	208	2 strokes	(England) Lora Fairclough	
26 Sep	Ladies Italian Open	Poggio dei Medici, Tuscany	Italy	(England) Samantha Head (1)	214	1 stroke	(Spain) Marina Arruti (Netherlands) Mette Hageman	
9 Oct	Air France Madame Biarritz Open	Golf de Biarritz le Phare	France	(Sweden) Sofia Grönberg-Whitmore (3)	200	3 strokes	(France) Sandrine Mendiburu	
24 Oct	Marrakech Open	Palmeraie Golf Palace	Morocco	(England) Trish Johnson (12)	204	5 strokes	(Belgium) Valérie Van Ryckeghem	
21 Nov	Praia d'El Rey Rover European Cup	Óbidos	Portugal	Ladies European Tour	11–9		European Senior Tour	Team event

Major championships in bold.

== Order of Merit rankings ==
Rank	Player	Money (£)
1	(England) Laura Davies	204,521
2	(Sweden) Catrin Nilsmark	131,565
3	(England) Alison Nicholas	128,223
4	(England) Trish Johnson	117,213
5	(Sweden) Sofia Grönberg-Whitmore	84,307
6	(Spain) Raquel Carriedo	72,779
7	(England) Lora Fairclough	69,342
8	(France) Sandrine Mendiburu	58,675
9	(Scotland) Janice Moodie	55,328
10	(Sweden) Sophie Gustafson	53,027

== See also ==
- 1999 LPGA Tour
