= 2003 Ladies European Tour =

Golf tournament series

2003 Ladies European Tour season
- Duration: February 2003 – September 2003
- Number of official events: 15
- Order of Merit: (Sweden) Sophie Gustafson
- Player of the Year: (Sweden) Sophie Gustafson
- Rookie of the Year: (Australia) Rebecca Stevenson
- Lowest stroke average: (Sweden) Sophie Gustafson

The 2003 Ladies European Tour was a series of golf tournaments for elite female golfers from around the world which took place from January through December 2003. The tournaments were sanctioned by the Ladies European Tour (LET).

== Tournaments ==
The table below shows the 2003 schedule. The numbers in brackets after the winners' names show the number of career wins they had on the Ladies European Tour up to and including that event. This is only shown for members of the tour.

Date	Name	Venue	Location	Winner	Prize fund	Prize fund (€)	Notes
23 Feb	ANZ Ladies Masters	RACV Royal Pines Resort	Australia	(England) Laura Davies (35)	$800,000	€460,064	Co-sanctioned by the ALPG Tour
2 Mar	AAMI Women's Australian Open	Terrey Hills Golf & Country Club	Australia	(Scotland) Mhairi McKay (n/a)	$500,000	€287,540	Co-sanctioned by the ALPG Tour
4 May	Tenerife Ladies Open	Golf Las Americas	Spain	(Germany) Elisabeth Esterl (1)	€200,000	€200,000	
18 May	La Perla Ladies Italian Open	UNA Poggio Dei Medici Golf Resort	Italy	(France) Ludivine Kreutz (1)	€190,000	€190,000	
25 May	Lancia Ladies Open of Portugal	Aroeira Golf Club	Portugal	(Australia) Alison Munt (3)	€165,000	€165,000	
1 Jun	Open de España Femenino	Campo de Golf de Salamanca	Spain	(Italy) Federica Dassù (6)	€250,000	€250,000	
15 Jun	Ladies Irish Open	Killarney Golf & Fishing Club	Ireland	(Sweden) Sophie Gustafson (9)	€165,000	€165,000	
22 Jun	Arras Open de France Dames	Golf d'Arras	France	(New Zealand) Lynnette Brooky (3)	€275,000	€275,000	
26 Jul	**Evian Masters**	Evian Masters Golf Club	France	(United States) Juli Inkster (n/a)	$2,100,000	$2,100,000	Co-sanctioned by the LPGA Tour
3 Aug	**Weetabix Women's British Open**	Royal Lytham & St Annes Golf Club	England	(Sweden) Annika Sörenstam (10)	£1,050,000	€1,670,445	Co-sanctioned by the LPGA Tour
10 Aug	HP Open	Royal Drottningholm Golf Club	Sweden	(Sweden) Sophie Gustafson (10)	£325,000	€517,042	
17 Aug	BT Ladies Open	Warrenpoint Golf Club	Northern Ireland	(Sweden) Sophie Gustafson (11)	£150,000	€238,635	
24 Aug	Wales WPGA Championship of Europe	Royal Porthcawl Golf Club	Wales	(Australia) Shani Waugh (2)	£400,000	€636,360	
14 Sep	Solheim Cup	Barsebäck Golf & Country Club	Sweden	Europe	Team event; no prize money		Co-sanctioned by the LPGA Tour
27 Sep	Biarritz Ladies Classic	Biarritz le Phare GC	France	(Sweden) Marlene Hedblom (1)	€165,000	€165,000	

Major championships in bold.

== Order of Merit rankings ==
Rank	Player	Country	Points
1	Sophie Gustafson	Sweden	917.95
2	Elisabeth Esterl	Germany	702.46
3	Laura Davies	England	681.25
4	Iben Tinning	Denmark	466.15
5	Lynnette Brooky	New Zealand	391.85
6	Ludivine Kreutz	France	388.36
7	Shani Waugh	Australia	386.55
8	Ana Sánchez	Spain	372.70
9	Trish Johnson	England	372.45
10	Stephanie Arricau	France	326.34

== See also ==
- 2003 LPGA Tour
