= Evian (disambiguation) =

Evian is a brand of bottled spring water.

Evian or similar terms may also refer to:

- Évian-les-Bains (a.k.a. Évian) a commune in France
- Évian Accords (1962), a treaty that ended the Algerian War of Independence
- Évian Conference (1938), a conference to deal with Jewish refugees fleeing Germany
- The Evian Group at IMD (formerly Evian Group), a group of governments and businesses committed to global markets that are open, inclusive, equitable, sustainable
- Evian Resort Golf Club, Évian-les-Bains, France
- The Evian Championship (golf), a women's golf championship in France
- Thonon Évian Savoie F. C. (a.k.a. Évian), a soccer team located in Thonon-les-Bains, France
- Evians, characters from the Land of Ev in L. Frank Baum's Oz books

== See also ==
- Évain, a community in the Canadian city of Rouyn-Noranda
