= 1997 Ladies European Tour =

Golf season

1997 Ladies European Tour season
- Duration: N/A
- Number of official events: 15
- Order of Merit: (England) Alison Nicholas
- Player of the Year: (England) Alison Nicholas
- Rookie of the Year: (Sweden) Anna Berg
- Lowest stroke average: (France) Marie-Laure de Lorenzi

The 1997 Ladies European Tour was a series of golf tournaments for elite female golfers from around the world which took place in 1997. The tournaments were sanctioned by the Ladies European Tour (LET).

== Tournaments ==
The table below shows the 1997 schedule. The numbers in brackets after the winners' names show the number of career wins they had on the Ladies European Tour up to and including that event. This is only shown for members of the tour.

Date	Tournament	Venue	Location	Winner	Score	Margin of victory	Runner(s)-up	Note
11 May	Estoril Ladies Open	Clube de Golf do Estoril	Portugal	(England) Mandy Sutton (1)	202	1 stroke	(Denmark) Karina Orum	
18 May	American Express Tour Player's Classic	Tytherington Golf Club	England	(Australia) Karen Lunn (7)	283	1 stroke	(Germany) Tina Fischer, (France) Patricia Meunier-Lebouc	
8 Jun	Ford-Stimorol Danish Open	Vejle Golf Club	Denmark	(England) Laura Davies (26)	207	3 strokes	(Sweden) Maria Hjorth	
15 Jun	Déesse Ladies' Swiss Open	Lausanne Golf Club	Switzerland	(France) Marie-Laure de Lorenzi (19)	280	Playoff	(England) Trish Johnson	
21 Jun	**Evian Masters**	Evian Resort Golf Club	France	(Japan) Hiromi Kobayashi (n/a)	274	Playoff	(England) Alison Nicholas	
29 Jun	Guardian Irish Open	Luttrellstown Golf Club	Ireland	(France) Patricia Meunier-Lebouc (2)	284	1 stroke	(Spain) Laura Navarro	
27 Jul	Ladies German Open	GCC Hamburg-Treudelberg	Germany	(Australia) Joanne Mills (1)	283	Playoff	(New Zealand) Lynnette Brooky	
10 Aug	McDonald's WPGA Championship of Europe	Gleneagles	Scotland	(Sweden) Helen Alfredsson (8)	276	4 strokes	(Sweden) Charlotta Sörenstam, (Scotland) Kathryn Marshall	
17 Aug	**Weetabix Women's British Open**	Sunningdale Golf Club	England	(Australia) Karrie Webb (2)	269	8 strokes	(United States) Rosie Jones	Co-sanctioned by the LPGA Tour
24 Aug	Compaq Open	Österåker Golf Club	Sweden	(Sweden) Annika Sörenstam (4)	277	6 strokes	(Sweden) Catrin Nilsmark	
7 Sep	Open de France Dames	Paris International GC	France	(Australia) Karen Lunn (8)	281	4 strokes	(South Africa) Laurette Maritz	
21 Sep	Hennessy Cup	Golf und Land Club Köln	Germany	(England) Laura Davies (27)	288	1 stroke	(Australia) Anne-Marie Knight	
5 Oct	Sicilian Ladies' Open/Italian Ladies' Open	Il Picciolo Golf Club	Italy	(Belgium) Valérie Van Ryckeghem (1)	288	Playoff	(Colombia) Patricia Gonzalez	
26 Oct	Air France Madame Open	Deauville Golf Club	France	(Australia) Loraine Lambert (1)	213	2 strokes	(England) Alison Nicholas	
16 Nov	Praia d'El Rey European Cup	Royal Óbidos Spa & Golf	Portugal	European Senior Tour	13–7		Ladies European Tour	Team event

Major championships in bold.

== Order of Merit rankings ==
Rank	Player	Prize money (£)
1	(England) Alison Nicholas	94,590
2	(Sweden) Helen Alfredsson	92,928
3	(France) Marie-Laure de Lorenzi	89,523
4	(England) Laura Davies	77,425
5	(Australia) Karen Lunn	65,143
6	(France) Patricia Meunier-Lebouc	52,999
7	(England) Joanne Morley	48,217
8	(Australia) Anne-Marie Knight	47,135
9	(England) Trish Johnson	45,742
10	(Sweden) Maria Hjorth	39,536

== See also ==
- 1997 LPGA Tour
