= Royal Marie-Claire Open =

Tournament information
- Location: Evian-les-Bains, France
- Established: 1999
- Course: Royal Golf Club Evian
- Par: 72
- Tour: Ladies European Tour
- Format: 54-hole Stroke play
- Month played: May
- Final year: 1999

Tournament record score
- Aggregate: 215 Silvia Cavalleri (1999)
- To par: −1 Silvia Cavalleri (1999)

Final champion
- (Italy) Silvia Cavalleri

The Royal Marie-Claire Open was a women's professional golf tournament on the Ladies European Tour that took place in France.

== Winners ==
Year	Dates	Venue	Winner	Country	Score	To par	Margin of victory	Runners-up	Note
1999	7–9 May	Royal Golf Club Evian	Silvia Cavalleri	Italy	215	−1	1 stroke	(Italy) Federica Dassù (Spain) Ana Belén Sánchez	
