= Marina Arruti =

Spanish professional golfer

Personal information
- Nationality: Spain
- Born: 23 May 1972 (age 54) San Sebastián, Spain
- Height: 164 cm (5 ft 5 in)

Career
- Sport: Golf
- Turned professional: 1995
- Former tours: Ladies European Tour (1995–2011); Banesto Golf Tour
- Professional wins: 3

Number of wins by tour
- Ladies European Tour: 1
- Other: 2

Best results in LPGA major championships
- Chevron Championship: DNP
- Women's PGA C'ship: DNP
- U.S. Women's Open: DNP
- Women's British Open: T7: 2001
- Evian Championship: DNP

Achievements and awards
- Banesto Golf Tour Order of Merit winner: 2010
Medal record
Mediterranean Games
Gold medal – first place	1993 Languedoc-Roussillon	Women's team
Bronze medal – third place	1993 Languedoc-Roussillon	Women's individual

Marina Arruti (born 23 May 1972) is a Spanish professional golfer. She played on the Ladies European Tour 1995–2011, and won the Ladies Austrian Open in 1999.

== Early life and family ==
Arruti was born in San Sebastián in 1972, where her father José Arruti Lizaso and his twin brother Jesús were club pros at Real Golf Club de San Sebastián. Her older sister Amaia is also a preofessional golfer who played on the Ladies European Tour, and her uncle's son Jesús María Arruti has played on the European Tour.

== Amateur career ==
In 1993, Arruti won the Portuguese International Ladies Amateur Championship. She represented Spain at the 1993 European Ladies' Team Championship and 1994 Espirito Santo Trophy.

Arruti won gold at the 1993 Mediterranean Games in Languedoc-Roussillon, France in the team event together with Estefania Knuth and Laura Navarro, and a bronze individually.

== Professional career ==
Arruti turned professional in January 1995 and joined the Ladies European Tour, where she finished 13th on the Order of Merit in her rookie season.

In 1999, she won the Ladies Austrian Open after birdieing the final three holes, and was runner-up at the Ladies Italian Open, a stroke behind Samantha Head. In 2001, she lost a playoff at the Biarritz Ladies Classic to Rachel Kirkwood.

Arruti's best result at a major came in the 2001 Women's British Open at Sunningdale Golf Club, where she tied for 7th.

Later in her career, Arruti also played on Spain's domestic Banesto Golf Tour, where she won the event at Sant Cugat near Barcelona back to back in 2010 and 2011, and topped the Order of Merit in 2010. The 2011 event was co-sanctioned by the Women's European Satellite Tour (WEST), an attempt by the Spanish and Swedish golf federations to establish an LET feeder tour, which was folded into the LET Access Series in 2012.

== Amateur wins ==
- 1993 Portuguese International Ladies Amateur Championship
- 1994 British U-23 Amateur Championship

== Professional wins (3) ==
=== Ladies European Tour (1) ===
No.	Date	Tournament	Winning score	To par	Margin of victory	Runner(s)-up	Ref
1	15 Jul 1999	Ladies Austrian Open	68-68-67=203	−13	2 strokes	(Germany) Elisabeth Esterl (Scotland) Dale Reid	

=== Women's European Satellite Tour (1) ===
No.	Date	Tournament	Winning score	To par	Margin of victory	Runner-up	Ref
1	7 Oct 2011	Banesto Golf Tour Sant Cugat^{1}	66-65=131	−13	1 stroke	(Spain) Mireia Prat (a)	

^{1}Co-sanctioned by the Banesto Golf Tour

=== Banesto Golf Tour wins (2) ===
- 2010 Banesto Golf Tour Sant Cugat
- 2011 Banesto Golf Tour Sant Cugat^{1}

^{1}Co-sanctioned by the Women's European Satellite Tour

== Team appearances ==
Amateur

- European Ladies' Team Championship (representing Spain): 1993
- Espirito Santo Trophy (representing Spain): 1994
