= 1996 Ladies European Tour =

Professional women's golf tour

1996 Ladies European Tour season
- Duration: N/A
- Number of official events: 18
- Order of Merit: (England) Laura Davies
- Player of the Year: (England) Laura Davies
- Rookie of the Year: (Australia) Anne-Marie Knight
- Lowest stroke average: (France) Marie-Laure de Lorenzi

The 1996 Ladies European Tour was a series of golf tournaments for elite female golfers from around the world which took place in 1996. The tournaments were sanctioned by the Ladies European Tour (LET).

== Tournaments ==
The table below shows the 1996 schedule. The numbers in brackets after the winners' names show the number of career wins they had on the Ladies European Tour up to and including that event. This is only shown for members of the tour.

Date	Tournament	Venue	Location	Winner	Score	Margin of victory	Runner(s)-up	Note
5 May	Women's Welsh Open	St Pierre Golf & Country Club	Wales	(England) Lisa Hackney (1)	289	1 stroke	(Spain) Laura Navarro (Australia) Anne-Marie Knight	
11 May	Costa Azul Ladies Open	Troia and Aroeira GC	Portugal	(Australia) Shani Waugh (1)	214	2 strokes	(France) Marie-Laure de Lorenzi (Philippines) Mary Grace Estuesta (Sweden) Helene Koch (Republic of Ireland) Aideen Rogers	
9 Jun	Ford-Stimorol Danish Open	Vejle Golf Club	Denmark	(Australia) Nadene Gole (1)	209	2 strokes	(Australia) Rachel Hetherington (Australia) Anne-Marie Knight	
16 Jun	Deesse Ladies' Swiss Open	Maison Blanche, Geneva	Switzerland	(Sweden) Sophie Gustafson (1)	280	1 stroke	(England) Lisa Hackney	
22 Jun	**Evian Masters**	Evian Resort Golf Club	France	(England) Laura Davies (23)	274	4 strokes	(Sweden) Carin Koch	
30 Jun	Glashütte Ladies' Austrian Open	Colony Club Gutenhof	Austria	(Germany) Martina Koch (1)	213	2 strokes	(New Zealand) Lynnette Brooky	
7 Jul	Hennessy Cup	Cologne	Germany	(Sweden) Helen Alfredsson (7)	280	Playoff	(Sweden) Liselotte Neumann (England) Trish Johnson	
28 Jul	Guardian Irish Open	Citywest GCC, Dublin	Ireland	(England) Alison Nicholas (12)	277	8 strokes	(England) Trish Johnson	
11 Aug	McDonald's WPGA Championship of Europe	Gleneagles	Scotland	(Germany) Tina Fischer (1)	278	1 stroke	(Sweden) Charlotta Sörenstam (England) Trish Johnson	
18 Aug	**Weetabix Women's British Open**	Woburn Golf and Country Club	England	(United States) Emilee Klein (1)	277	7 strokes	(United States) Amy Alcott (United States) Penny Hammel	Co-sanctioned by the LPGA Tour
25 Aug	Trygg Hansa Ladies' Open	Haninge GC, Stockholm	Sweden	(Sweden) Annika Sörenstam (3)	279	1 stroke	(England) Joanne Morley (England) Alison Nicholas	
1 Sep	Compaq Open	Örebro GC	Sweden	(Italy) Federica Dassù (5)	280	Playoff	(Sweden) Helen Alfredsson (Scotland) Kathryn Marshall	
8 Sep	Marks & Spencer European Open	Hanbury Manor	England	(England) Trish Johnson (9)	274	5 strokes	(Sweden) Pernilla Sterner (Australia) Anne-Marie Knight	
15 Sep	Wilkinson Sword Ladies' English Open	The Oxfordshire Golf Club	England	(England) Laura Davies (24)	273	4 strokes	(Sweden) Helen Alfredsson	
29 Sep	Ladies German Open	Treudelberg GC, Hamburg	Germany	(England) Joanne Morley (1)	281	4 strokes	(Sweden) Maria Hjorth	
13 Oct	Open de France Dames	Le Golf d'Arras	France	(England) Trish Johnson (10)	200	10 strokes	(Spain) Raquel Carriedo-Tomás (England) Fiona Pike	
20 Oct	Italian Ladies' Open di Sicilia	Il Picciolo GC, Sicily	Italy	(England) Laura Davies (25)	282	3 strokes	(Germany) Tina Fischer (England) Fiona Pike	
2 Nov	Open de España Femenino	La Manga	Spain	(South Africa) Caryn Louw (1)	206	4 strokes	(Spain) Assia Arruti	

Major championships in bold.

== Order of Merit rankings ==
Rank	Player	Money (£)
1	(England) Laura Davies	110,880
2	(Sweden) Helen Alfredsson	97,804
3	(England) Trish Johnson	80,333
4	(England) Alison Nicholas	69,878
5	(England) Lisa Hackney	69,550
6	(England) Joanne Morley	56,254
7	(France) Marie-Laure de Lorenzi	56,026
8	(Germany) Tina Fischer	47,585
9	(Italy) Federica Dassù	40,631
10	(Spain) Laura Navarro	36,791

== See also ==
- 1996 LPGA Tour
