= 1994 Espirito Santo Trophy =

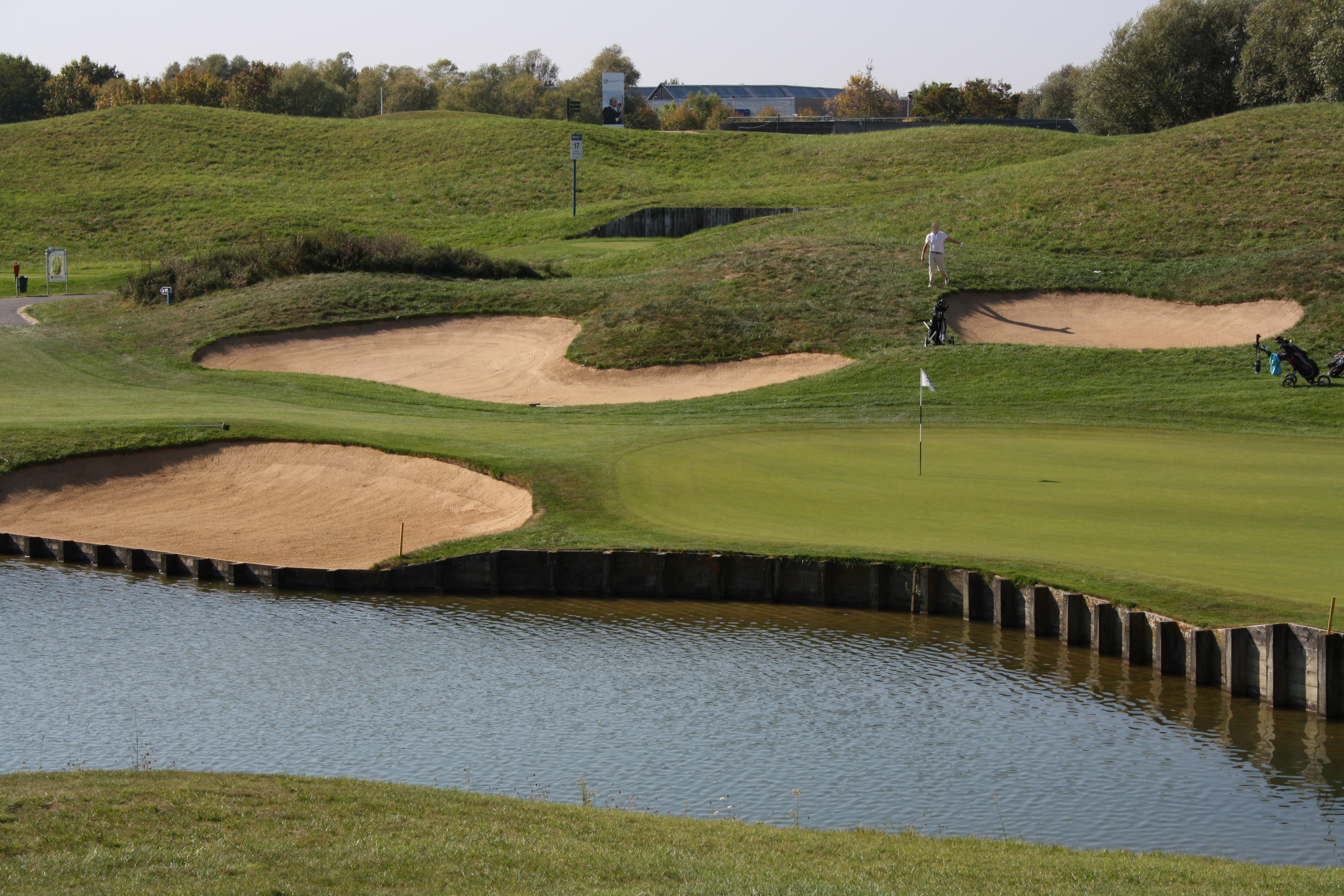
- Albatros Course at Le Golf National

Tournament information
- Dates: 28 September – 1 October
- Location: Guyancourt, France; 48.7532°N 2.0755°E
- Course: Le Golf National (Albatros course)
- Organized by: World Amateur Golf Council
- Format: 72 holes stroke play

Statistics
- Par: 72
- Field: 29 teams 87 players

Champion
- United States; Sarah LeBrun Ingram, Carol Semple Thompson, Wendy Ward
- 569 (−7)
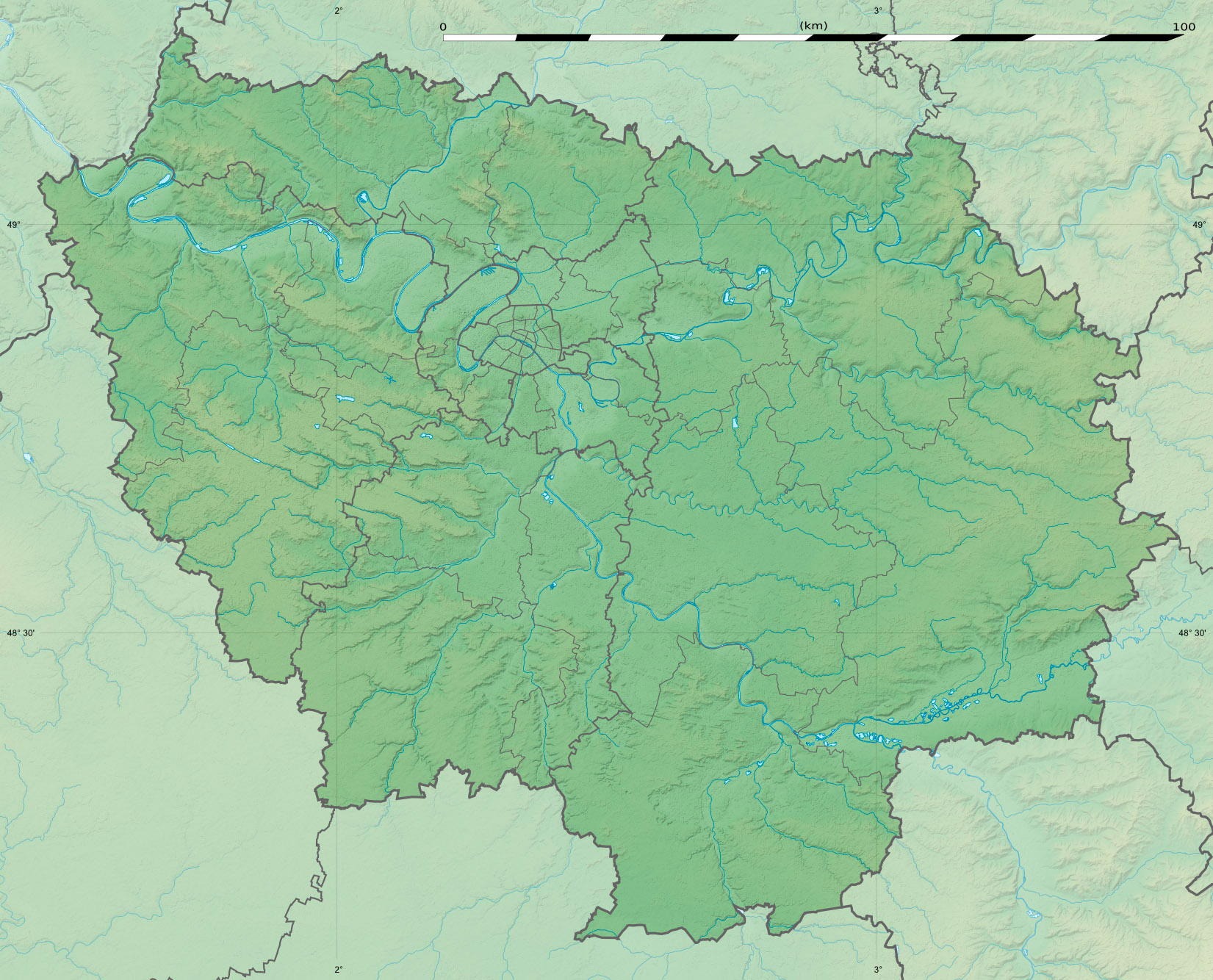
- Location in France Location in Île-de-France

The 1994 Espirito Santo Trophy took place 28 September – 1 October at Le Golf National in Guyancourt south-west of Paris, France.

It was the 16th women's golf World Amateur Team Championship for the Espirito Santo Trophy and 30-year anniversary of the inaugural event in 1964, which also was held in France, close to Paris. At the time of the 1994 championship, its initiator in 1964, Lally Segard, retired from her position, after serving for 30 years, as chairperson of the women's committee of the organizing World Amateur Golf Council, when the championship returned to her home town.

The tournament was a 72-hole stroke play team event with 29 team entries, each with three players. The best two scores for each round counted towards the team total.

The United States team won the Trophy for their 12th title, beating South Korea by four strokes. South Korea earned the silver medal while the Sweden team took the bronze on third place another stroke back. Defending champions Spain finished fourth, one shot from third place.

The individual title went to Wendy Ward, United States, whose score of 10-under-par, 278, was two strokes ahead of Sarah Beautell, Spain.

== Teams ==
29 teams entered the event and completed the competition. Each team had three players.

Country	Players
Argentina	Maria Combes, Maria Larrauri, Maria Olivero
Australia	Anne-Marie Knight, Karrie Webb, Simone Williams
Austria	Lillan Mensi-Klarbach, Nina Mensi-Klarbach, Katharina Poppmeier
Belgium	Lana Freund, Catherine Pons, Valérie Van Ryckeghem
Bermuda	Judith Anne Astwood Outerbridge, Madeline Joell-Warren, Kim Marshall
Brazil	Maria Candida Hanneman, Elisabeth Nickhorn, Cristina Schmitt Baldi
Canada	Mary Ann Lapointe, Kareen Qually, Aileen Robertson
Czech Republic	Martina Dornikova, Ludmila Krenkova, Lucie Tobrmanova
Chinese Taipei	Hsiao-Chuan Lu, Ya-Huei Lu, Wen-Ying Tsai
Colombia	Maria Isabel Baena, Luisa Fernanda Cuartas, Monica Ledes
Denmark	Camilla Faaborg-Andersen, Christina Kuld, Iben Tinning
Finland	Riikka Hakkarainen, Anna Hokkanen, Nina Laitinen
France	Stéphanie Dallongeville, Kristel Mourgue d'Algue, Amandine Vincent
Germany	Tina Fischer, Heidi Klump, Martina Koch
Great Britain & Ireland	Julie Hall, Kirsty Speak, Lisa Walton
Iceland	Herborg Arnarsdotir, Karen Sevarsdotir, Ragnhildur Sigurdardotir
Italy	Maria Paula Casati, Caterina Quintarelli, Alessandra Salvi
Japan	Riko Higashio, Mayumi Nakajima, Haru Sakagami
Mexico	Erika Diaz, Roxana Lemus, Vinny Riviello
Netherlands	Catryn Geleynse, Laura Thijssen, Marieke Zelsman
New Zealand	Lynnette Brooky, Susan Farron, Kerryn Starr
Norway	Line Berg, Cecilie Lundgreen, Vibeke Stensrud
Portugal	Teresa Abecassis, Isabel Dantas, Graca Medina
South Africa	Mandy Adamson, Sanet Marais, Barbara Plant
South Korea	Mi-Hyun Kim, Oh Yun Kwon, Se Ri Pak
Spain	Marina Arruti, Sara Beautell, María José Pons
Sweden	Sophie Eriksson, Maria Hjorth, Anna-Carin Jonasson
Switzerland	Sophie Ducrey, Alexandra Gasser, Lisa Schaufelberger
United States	Sarah LeBrun Ingram, Carol Semple Thompson, Wendy Ward

== Results ==
Place	Country	Score	To par
1	United States	141-141-141-146=569	−7
2	South Korea	141-146-146-140=573	−3
3	Sweden	147-143-146-138=574	−2
4	Spain	140-148-143-144=575	−1
5	Australia	140-144-147-146=577	+1
6	South Africa	149-148-146-136=581	+5
7	France	141-145-146-150=582	+6
T8	Germany	150-147-145-147=589	+13
T8	Great Britain & Ireland	156-146-144-143=589	+13
T8	New Zealand	146-145-153-145=589	+13
11	Japan	145-149-150-148=592	+16
12	Belgium	143-146-152-154=595	+19
T13	Austria	147-151-144-155=597	+21
T13	Brazil	147-143-150-157=597	+21
T15	Chinese Taipei	150-149-145-158=602	+26
T15	Italy	142-148-159-153=602	+26
T17	Canada	149-151-155-148=603	+27
T17	Denmark	144-146-158-155=603	+27
19	Colombia	147-151-157-151=606	+30
20	Norway	152-157-146-153=608	+32
21	Netherlands	152-150-154-153=609	+33
22	Argentina	153-146-149-156=614	+38
23	Finland	154-154-155-156=619	+43
24	Iceland	155-157-153-156=621	+45
T25	Switzerland	153-155-158-156=622	+46
T25	Mexico	622	+46
27	Bermuda	159-159-164-161=643	+67
28	Czech Republic	162-172-167-155=656	+80
29	Portugal	168-171-157-164=660	+84

== Individual leaders ==
There was no official recognition for the lowest individual scores.

Place	Player	Country	Score	To par
1	Wendy Ward	United States	69-68-67-74=278	−10
2	Sara Beautell	Spain	70-72-68-70=280	−8
3	Se Ri Pak	South Korea	71-74-76-65=286	−2
T4	Stephanie Dallongeville	France	69-73-72-74=288	E
T4	Karrie Webb	Australia	71-68-76-73=288	E
6	Anne-Marie Knight	Australia	69-76-71-73=289	+1
T7	Lana Freund	Belgium	69-72-72-77=290	+2
T7	Anna-Carin Jonasson	Sweden	73-74-74-69=290	+2
9	Maria Hjorth	Sweden	75-69-78-69=291	+3
10	Tina Fischer	Germany	77-72-71-72=292	+4
