= Laura Davies =

English professional golfer (born 1963)

Dame Laura Davies DBE
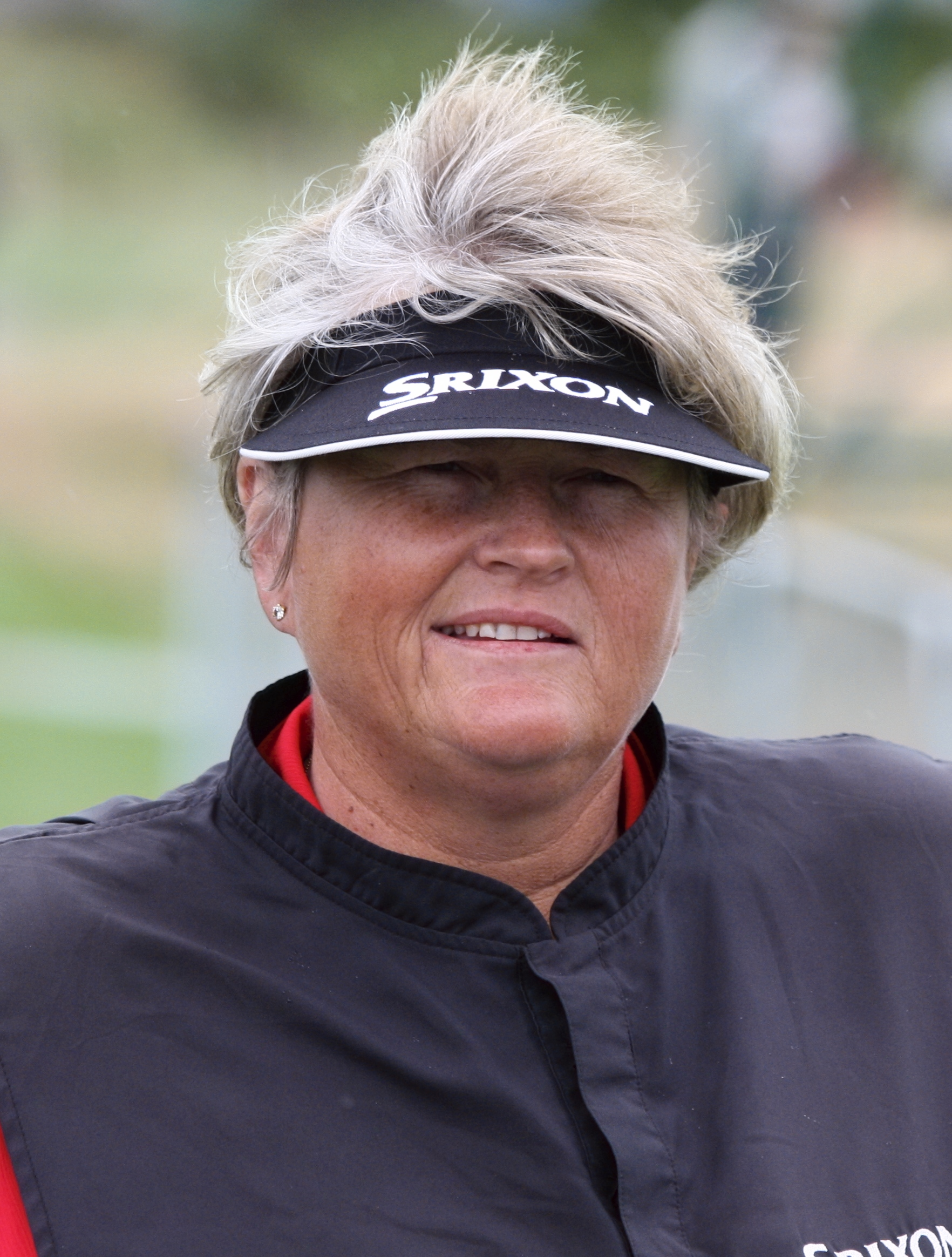
- Davies in 2009

Personal information
- Full name: Laura Jane Davies
- Nationality: England
- Born: 5 October 1963 (age 63) Coventry, Warwickshire, England
- Height: 5 ft 10 in (1.78 m)

Career
- Sport: Golf
- Turned professional: 1985
- Current tour: Legends Tour
- Former tours: LPGA Tour (joined 1988); Ladies European Tour (joined 1985)
- Professional wins: 86

Number of wins by tour
- LPGA Tour: 20
- Ladies European Tour: 45 (1st all-time)
- LPGA of Japan Tour: 7
- Ladies Asian Golf Tour: 2
- WPGA Tour of Australasia: 8
- Other: 4 (regular); 4 (senior)

Best results in LPGA major championships (wins: 4)
- Chevron Championship: 2nd: 1994
- Women's PGA C'ship: Won: 1994, 1996
- U.S. Women's Open: Won: 1987
- du Maurier Classic: Won: 1996
- Women's British Open: T8: 2004
- Evian Championship: T41: 2014

Achievements and awards
- World Golf Hall of Fame: 2015 (member page)
- Ladies European Tour Player of the Year: 1996, 1999
- Ladies European Tour Rookie of the Year: 1985
- Ladies European Tour Order of Merit: 1985, 1986, 1992, 1996, 1999, 2004, 2006
- LPGA Tour Money Winner: 1994
- LPGA Tour Player of the Year: 1996
- GWAA Female Player of the Year: 1994, 1996
- Best Female Golfer ESPY Award: 1995
- Commander of the Order of the British Empire: 2000
- GWAA ASAPSports /Jim Murray Award: 2013
- Middle East Golf Awards Ultimate Recognition: 2014

Laura Davies
Personal information
- Position: Forward

Senior career*
Years	Team	Apps	(Gls)
1997	Myrtle Beach Seadawgs	1	(0)
Total		1	(0)
- * Club domestic league appearances and goals

Dame Laura Jane Davies (born 5 October 1963) is an English professional golfer. She has achieved the status of her nation's most accomplished female golfer of modern times, being the second non-American to finish at the top of the LPGA money list as well as winning the Ladies European Tour (LET) Order of Merit a record seven times: in 1985, 1986, 1992, 1996, 1999, 2004 and 2006.

As of 2018, Davies has 86 professional wins worldwide, with 20 on the LPGA Tour, including four majors. From 1985 to 2010, she won at least one individual title somewhere in the world every season, except for 2005, and was the first golfer, male or female, to win tournaments on five continents in one year. She is a member of U.S.-based LPGA Tour and a life member of the Ladies European Tour. She was inducted into the World Golf Hall of Fame in 2015.

== Amateur career ==
A native of Coventry, Davies began as an amateur international player for Great Britain, compiling a notable record. She was the 1983 English Intermediate Champion, the 1984 Welsh Ladies Open Stroke Play Champion and the South Eastern Champion in both 1983 and 1984. She represented England twice at the European Lady Junior's Team Championship (where she was on the winning team in 1983) and was a member of the 1984 Great Britain and Ireland Curtis Cup team.

== Professional career ==
=== Ladies European Tour ===
Davies turned professional in 1985. She started her professional career on the WPGET (now Ladies European Tour) in 1985 when she won both Rookie of the Year and Order of Merit titles. She subsequently won the Sports Journalists' Association Peter Wilson Trophy as International Newcomer of the Year 1985. She repeated the Order of Merit win in 1986 having won four titles, one of which was the Women's British Open (prior to it becoming a major).

In 1987, she went to the United States and won the U.S. Women's Open in an 18-hole playoff against Ayako Okamoto and JoAnne Carner. It was a victory that led the LPGA to amend its constitution. Davies was not a member of the LPGA Tour, so the LPGA changed its constitution to grant Davies automatic membership. Davies became the third non-U.S. citizen and the second European player, after Catherine Lacoste in 1967, to win the U.S. Women's Open. For six days, Davies was holder of both the U.S and British Open titles. The 1987 Women's British Open took place the week after the U.S. Women's Open and in her defence Davies finished tied second, one shot behind winner Alison Nicholas.

=== LPGA Tour ===
From 1988, Davies played on both the LPGA and Ladies European Tours. In 1988, Davies won twice as a rookie on the LPGA Tour, three times on the Ladies European Tour and once in Japan, becoming the first woman ever to win on all three major Tours in the same year.

Her four consecutive victories at the J Golf Phoenix LPGA International between 1994 and 1997 made Davies the first LPGA player to win the same tournament in four consecutive years.

In 1994, she was the first golfer, male or female, to win on five different golf tours in one calendar year: US, Europe, Asia, Japan and Australia. and became the first European player to be ranked unofficial number one in the world on the Ping Leaderboard. In 1996, she was again ranked number one on the Ping leaderboard.

In 2004 Davies was the first woman to compete in the men's European Tour, entering the ANZ Championship in Sydney, Australia, playing from the same tees as the men. She failed to make the cut, finishing second to last. She beat the LPGA Tour record for most eagles in a season, scoring 19 during the 2004 season.

=== Solheim Cup and other team appearances ===
In 1990, she was a member of the inaugural European Solheim Cup Team. She returned as part of every European team through 2011. Davies is the only player to participate in the first 12 Solheim Cup matches on either the United States or European side. Davies is the all-time leader in points won in the Solheim Cup, breaking the record of Annika Sörenstam by winning a Saturday fourballs match partnered by Melissa Reid on 24 September 2011. Davies went on to increase her record point total to 25 by halving her singles match with Juli Inkster on 25 September 2011, as the Europeans captured the Solheim Cup for the fourth time. She was appointed as non-playing assistant captain for the European teams at the 2019, 2021 and 2023 Solheim Cup tournaments.

Davies was part of the LPGA team at the Wendy's 3-Tour Challenge three times between 1994 and 1996.

Davies also was part of a mixed team event of PGA Tour and LPGA Tour players at the JCPenney Classic four times between 1996 and 1999. Davies won the event in 1999 alongside John Daly.

She represented England at the Women's World Cup of Golf in 2000 (with Trish Johnson when winning individually), 2005 (with Karen Stupples), 2006 (with Kirsty Taylor) and 2007 (with Trish Johnson). She was a Captain's pick for the International Team at the 2006 Lexus Cup.

=== Senior career ===
At 49 years of age in 2012, Davies won a senior tour event for the first time, the ISPS Handa Legends Tour Open Championship on the Legends Tour, where there was a minimum age limit of 45.

Davies was the first woman to compete among the men in a European Senior Tour event. She played in the 2018 Shipco Masters in Denmark, from the same tees as her male opponents.

In 2018, aged 55, Davies finished runner up at Bank of Hope Founders Cup on the LPGA Tour, including shooting a Saturday round of 63.

On 15 July 2018, Davies claimed the inaugural U.S. Senior Women's Open at Chicago Golf Club by shooting 16-under-par for a 10-shot victory over fellow Hall of Famer Juli Inkster. Then on 17 October, she made the "senior slam" by following that up by capturing her second senior major, the Senior LPGA Championship at French Lick Resort in Indiana with a score of 8-under-par, a four shot margin over Helen Alfredsson and Silvia Cavalleri.

== Awards and honours ==
- In 1993, Davies was elected Honorary Lifetime Member of the Ladies European Tour, at the time named the WPGA Tour, for services to the tour.
- She was named the Sports Journalists' Association Sportswoman of the Year 1995 and 1996.
- In 1996, Davies won the Sunday Times Sportswomen of the Year Award.
- Davies was appointed Member of the Order of the British Empire (MBE) in the 1988 Birthday Honours,
- In 2000, She was recognized during the LPGA's 50th anniversary as one of the top 50 players in the history of the LPGA.
- In 2000, she was appointed Commander of the Order of the British Empire (CBE).
- She was appointed Dame Commander of the Order of the British Empire (DBE) at the 2014 Birthday Honours, all for services to women's golf.
- In January 2013, the Golf Writers Association of America announced that Davies would be the year's recipient of the ASAP Sports/Jim Murray Award, which recognises a golfer for "cooperation, quotability and accommodation with the media." The other finalists were Luke Donald and Greg Norman. The award was presented at the annual GWAA dinner at Augusta, Georgia, on 10 April.
- In February 2015, Davies was announced as one of seven women, invited as the first female honorary members of The Royal and Ancient Golf Club of St Andrews. The other six women were HRH Princess Anne, Renee Powell, Belle Robertson, Lally Segard, Louise Suggs and Annika Sörenstam. They joined the existing 15 male honorary members, whom included President George H. W. Bush, Peter Thomson CBE, Jack Nicklaus, Arnold Palmer and Gary Player.
- In 2015, she was inducted into the World Golf Hall of Fame.
- On 18 April 2016, Davies was appointed the first honorary president of the Parliamentary Golf Group, an all-party organisation of MPs working to improve the state of golf in the United Kingdom.
- On 12 July 2016, Davies was presented with the "Spirit of Golf" Award from the Golf Foundation in a ceremony at Royal Troon. Davies is the first recipient of the prestigious honour.

== Off-course activities ==
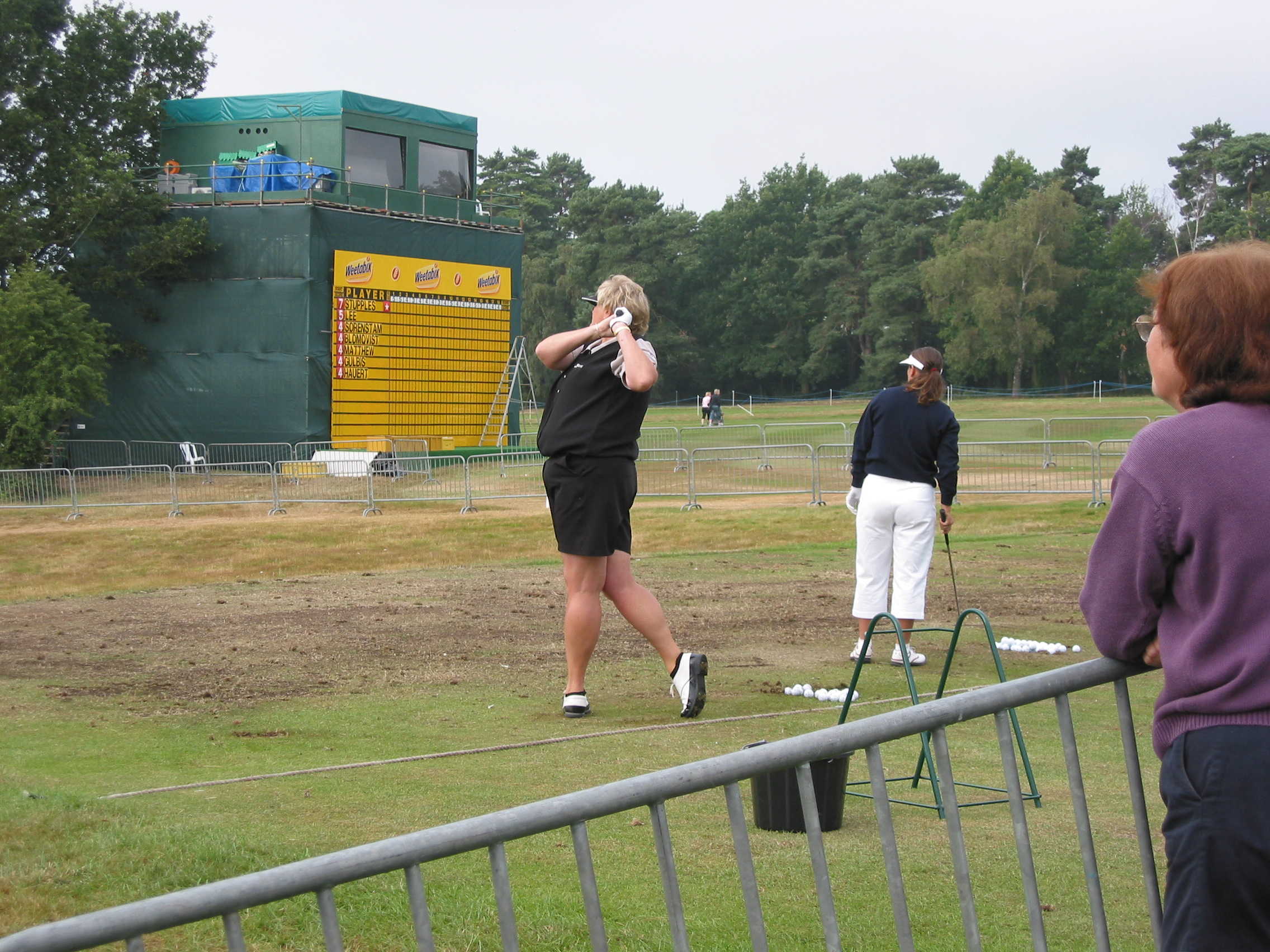
Laura Davies on the practice range during the Women's British Open 2004 at Sunningdale Golf Club

Davies published an autobiography in 1996.

Davies enjoys all sports and is an avid football fan and a Liverpool F.C. supporter. She organises the annual football match at the Evian Masters tournament in France and she has in the past been fined by the Ladies European Tour for watching an England versus Spain European Championship football match on a portable television during the final round of the 1996 Evian Masters in France, a tournament she nevertheless won.

She is also the captain of the Rest of the World team in the annual Rest of the World V Australia cricket match held during the ANZ Ladies Masters.

In 2001, Davies joined the BBC Sport commentary team member at The Open Championship. and has regularly appeared in the commentary box for major golfing events on the BBC.

Davies has built a nine-hole golf course (one full size green and greenside bunker plus nine tees) in the garden of her house.

In 2004, she hosted a celebrity fourball tournament for the charity Sport Relief.

Davies has always had an interest in gambling, having formerly been a bookmaker's assistant, and this interest led to her becoming a racehorse owner.

In 2006 Davies completed a 56-mile charity walk along the Great Wall of China to raise funds for Great Ormond Street Hospital. In 2012, she was named by the Golf Club Managers' Association's Golf Club Management magazine as the 32nd most powerful person in British golf due to her ability to inspire girls and women to play the game.

=== Football career ===
In 1997, 33-year-old Davies signed a four-year contract worth $1 as part of a publicity stunt for newly established American soccer team Myrtle Beach Seadawgs in the USISL D-3 Pro League. She played in one league game for the club, a six-minute cameo in a 4–1 loss against New Jersey Imperials on 18 April 1997. The future United States national soccer team international Tim Howard made his away debut in the game. Howard wrote in his book that the Seadawgs had offered a bonus of $500 to any player who could assist Davies score a goal.

== Professional wins (86) ==
=== LPGA Tour wins (20) ===
Legend
LPGA Tour major championships (4)
Other LPGA Tour (16)

No.	Date	Tournament	Winning score	Margin of victory	Runner(s)-up
1	26 Jul 1987	**U.S. Women's Open**	−3 (72-70-72-71=285)	Playoff	(United States) JoAnne Carner (Japan) Ayako Okamoto
2	20 Mar 1988	Circle K LPGA Tucson Open	−10 (64-74-69-72=278)	1 stroke	(United States) Robin Walton
3	5 Jun 1988	Jamie Farr Toledo Classic	−11 (69-70-69-69=277)	3 strokes	(United States) Nancy Lopez
4	18 Jun 1989	Lady Keystone Open	−9 (67-73-67=207)	1 stroke	(United States) Pat Bradley
5	10 Mar 1991	Inamori Classic	−11 (70-68-72-67=277)	4 strokes	(United States) Lynn Connelly (United States) Judy Dickinson
6	16 May 1993	McDonald's Championship	−7 (66-69-73-69=277)	1 stroke	(United States) Sherri Steinhauer
7	20 Mar 1994	Standard Register PING	−15 (69-72-66-70=277)	4 strokes	(United States) Elaine Crosby (United States) Beth Daniel
8	8 May 1994	Sara Lee Classic	−13 (65-70-68=203)	1 stroke	(United States) Meg Mallon
9	15 May 1994	**McDonald's LPGA Championship**	−5 (70-72-69-68-279)	3 strokes	(United States) Alice Ritzman
10	19 Mar 1995	Standard Register PING	−12 (69-68-70-73=280)	1 stroke	(United States) Beth Daniel
11	23 Apr 1995	Chick-fil-A Charity Championship	−15 (67-67-67=201)	4 strokes	(United States) Kelly Robbins
12	24 Mar 1996	Standard Register PING	−8 (71-73-69-71=284)	1 stroke	(United States) Kristal Parker-Manzo
13	12 May 1996	**McDonald's LPGA Championship**	E (72-71-70=213)	1 stroke	(United States) Julie Piers
14	4 Aug 1996	**du Maurier Classic**	−11 (71-70-70-66=277)	2 strokes	(United States) Nancy Lopez (Australia) Karrie Webb
15	25 Aug 1996	Star Bank LPGA Classic	−12 (68-66-70=204)	3 strokes	(United States) Pat Hurst (United States) Maggie Will
16	23 Mar 1997	Standard Register PING	−15 (70-69-70-68=277)	Playoff	(United States) Kelly Robbins
17	22 Nov 1998	PageNet Tour Championship	−11 (66-67-75-69=277)	4 strokes	(United States) Brandie Burton (United States) Pat Hurst (Australia) Karrie Webb
18	13 Feb 2000	Los Angeles Women's Championship	−5 (67-71-73=211)	3 strokes	(Sweden) Carin Koch (Scotland) Janice Moodie (United States) Michele Redman
19	7 May 2000	The Philips Invitational	−5 (68-67-68-72=275)	2 strokes	(United States) Dottie Pepper
20	10 Jun 2001	Wegmans Rochester International	−9 (68-68-69-74=279)	3 strokes	(Sweden) Maria Hjorth (United States) Wendy Ward

LPGA Tour playoff record (2–8)

No.	Year	Tournament	Opponent(s)	Result
1	1987	**U.S. Women's Open**	(United States) JoAnne Carner (Japan) Ayako Okamoto	Won 18-hole playoff (Davies:71, Okamoto:73, Carner:74)
2	1992	ShopRite LPGA Classic	(France) Anne Marie Palli	Lost to birdie on first extra hole
3	1992	Rail Charity Golf Classic	(United States) Nancy Lopez	Lost to par on first extra hole
4	1994	JAL Big Apple Classic	(United States) Beth Daniel	Lost to birdie on first extra hole
5	1995	Samsung World Championship of Women's Golf	(Sweden) Annika Sörenstam	Lost to birdie on first extra hole
6	1996	State Farm Rail Classic	(United States) Michelle McGann (United States) Barb Whitehead	McGann won with birdie on third extra hole
7	1996	Toray Japan Queens Cup	(Japan) Mayumi Hirase	Lost to par on third extra hole
8	1997	Standard Register PING	(United States) Kelly Robbins	Won with par on first extra hole
9	1997	Giant Eagle LPGA Classic	(United States) Tammie Green	Lost to eagle on fifth extra hole
10	1999	PageNet Championship	(South Korea) Se Ri Pak (Australia) Karrie Webb	Pak won with birdie on first extra hole

LPGA majors are shown in bold.

=== Ladies European Tour wins (45) ===
No.	Date	Tournament	Winning score	Margin of victory	Runner(s)-up
1	30 Jun 1985	Belgian Ladies Open	−6 (70-71-73-72=286)	1 stroke	(England) Maxine Burton
2	14 Jun 1986	McEwan's Wirral Classic	−11 (72-71-70-72=285)	3 strokes	(England) Penny Grice-Whittaker (England) Beverley New (Scotland) Dale Reid
3	13 Sep 1986	Greater Manchester Tournament	−20 (63-70-67-68=268)	3 strokes	(England) Penny Grice-Whittaker
4	12 Oct 1986	Women's British Open	−17 (71-73-69-70=283)	4 strokes	(United States) Peggy Conley (Spain) Marta Figueras-Dotti
5	24 Oct 1986	La Manga Spanish Open	−10 (72-72-68-74=286)	4 strokes	(Australia) Corinne Dibnah
6	14 Sep 1987	Italian Ladies' Open	−3 (73-72-69-71=285)	1 stroke	(Sweden) Liselotte Neumann
7	30 Apr 1988	Ford Ladies' Classic	−8 (72-76-69-75=292)	1 stroke	(Australia) Corinne Dibnah
8	18 Sep 1988	Italian Ladies' Open	−19 (65-67-69-68=269)	9 strokes	(France) Marie-Laure de Lorenzi-Taya
9	16 Oct 1988	Biarritz Ladies Open	−9 (65-67-68-67=267)	1 stroke	(France) Marie-Laure de Lorenzi-Taya
10	15 Oct 1989	Laing Ladies Charity Classic	−16 (72-64-72-68=276)	3 strokes	(Scotland) Jane Connachan (Australia) Corinne Dibnah (United States) Susan Moon (Scotland) Dale Reid
11	28 Oct 1990	AGF Biarritz Ladies Open (Tournament shortened from 72 to 36 holes due to rain)	−2 (63-73=136)	1 stroke	(England) Alison Nicholas
12	21 Apr 1991	Valextra Classic	−7 (71-71-70-69=281)	4 strokes	(Spain) Tania Abitbol
13	28 Jun 1992	European Ladies Open	−11 (72-70-71-72=285)	2 strokes	(Sweden) Catrin Nilsmark
14	2 Aug 1992	Ladies English Open	−11 (72-69-69-71=281)	7 strokes	(Spain) Tania Abitbol (France) Marie-Laure de Lorenzi (Australia) Corinne Dibnah (England) Alison Nicholas
15	20 Sep 1992	BMW Italian Ladies' Open	−14 (66-66-73-69=274)	5 strokes	(France) Sandrine Mendiburu
16	5 Sep 1993	Waterford Dairies Ladies' English Open	−11 (71-72-64-70=277)	1 stroke	(France) Marie-Laure de Lorenzi
17	31 Jul 1994	Holiday Ireland Women's Open	−6 (70-72-69-71=282)	8 strokes	(Sweden) Carin Koch (Wales) Helen Wadsworth
18	7 Aug 1994	The New Skoda Women's Scottish Open	−10 (69-69-68-72=278)	1 stroke	(Denmark) Karina Ørum
19	10 Jun 1995	Evian Masters	−17 (68-67-69-67=271)	5 strokes	(Sweden) Annika Sörenstam
20	30 Jul 1995	Guardian Irish Holidays Open	−25 (67-66-66-68=267)	16 strokes	(Sweden) Åsa Gottmo
21	13 Aug 1995	Woodpecker Women's Welsh Open	−14 (68-69-71-70=278)	3 strokes	(Australia) Wendy Doolan
22	3 Sep 1995	Wilkinson Sword Ladies' English Open	−9 (72-67-70-70=279)	1 stroke	(Denmark) Karina Ørum
23	22 Jun 1996	Evian Masters	−14 (72-69-65-68=274)	4 strokes	(Sweden) Carin Koch
24	15 Sep 1996	Wilkinson Sword Ladies' English Open	−15 (72-66-68-67=273)	4 strokes	(Sweden) Helen Alfredsson
25	20 Oct 1996	Italian Ladies' Open di Sicilia	−10 (68-70-68-76=282)	3 strokes	(Germany) Tina Fischer (England) Fiona Pike
26	8 Jun 1997	Ford-Stimorol Danish Open	−9 (68-70-69=207)	3 strokes	(Sweden) Maria Hjorth
27	21 Sep 1997	Hennessy Cup	E (75-71-68-74=288)	1 stroke	(Australia) Anne-Marie Knight
28	26 Jul 1998	Chrysler Open	-8 (72-71-71-70=284)	6 strokes	(England) Trish Johnson (Spain) Raquel Carriedo
29	4 Jul 1999	Chrysler Open	−15 (71-69-66-67=273)	8 strokes	(England) Alison Nicholas
30	8 Aug 1999	McDonald's WPGA Championship	−8 (70-69-69-72=280)	Playoff	(Sweden) Maria Hjorth
31	22 Aug 1999	Compaq Open	−15 (67-69-71-70=277)	4 strokes	(Sweden) Helen Alfredsson
32	17 Sep 2000	TSN Ladies World Cup Golf (individual event)	−7 (71-67-71=209)	3 strokes	(Sweden) Sophie Gustafson (France) Marine Monnet
33	9 Sep 2001	WPGA International Matchplay	5 & 4		(Scotland) Janice Moodie
34	4 Aug 2002	P4 Norwegian Masters	−5 (73-69-68-73=283)	Playoff	(Spain) Ana Larraneta
35	23 Feb 2003	ANZ Ladies Masters^{1}	−13 (67-68-68=203)	1 stroke	(Australia) Rebecca Stevenson (Australia) Karrie Webb
36	7 Mar 2004	AAMI Women's Australian Open^{1}	−5 (68-68-77-70=283)	6 strokes	(Australia) Rachel Teske
37	27 Aug 2006	SAS Masters	−11 (69-68-68=205)	6 strokes	(Belgium) Ellen Smets
38	29 Sep 2007	UNIQA Ladies Golf Open	−16 (69-65-66=200)	4 strokes	(Sweden) Sophie Gustafson
39	14 Sep 2008	UNIQA Ladies Golf Open	−15 (71-67-67-68=273)	3 strokes	(England) Lisa Hall
40	15 Feb 2009	Women's Australian Open^{1}	−7 (74-76-67-68=285)	1 stroke	(Spain) Tania Elósegui
41	28 Feb 2010	Pegasus New Zealand Women's Open^{1}	−9 (69-71-71-68=279)	2 strokes	(Australia) Sarah Kemp (Sweden) Pernilla Lindberg (Norway) Marianne Skarpnord
42	16 May 2010	UniCredit Ladies German Open	−11 (71-72-66-68=277)	2 strokes	(England) Melissa Reid
43	5 Sep 2010	UNIQA Ladies Golf Open	−11 (70-65-70=205)	1 stroke	(France) Virginie Lagoutte-Clément
44	19 Sep 2010	Open De España Femenino	−11 (65-66-71=202)	2 strokes	(Australia) Frances Bondad (England) Rebecca Hudson (United States) Christina Kim
45	13 Nov 2010	Hero Honda Women's Indian Open	−3 (65-78-70=213)	Playoff	(South Africa) Tandi Cuningham (Sweden) Louise Friberg (Thailand) Nontaya Srisawang

Note: Davies won the Women's British Open once before it became co-sanctioned by the LPGA Tour in 1994 and recognized as a major championship by the LPGA Tour in 2001 and the Evian Championship (formerly named the Evian Masters) twice before it became co-sanctioned by the LPGA Tour in 2000 and recognized as a major championship by the LPGA Tour in 2013.

Ladies European Tour playoff record (3–7)

No.	Year	Tournament	Opponent(s)	Result
1	1986	British Olivetti Tournament	(Scotland) Dale Reid	Lost to birdie on first extra hole
2	1987	Bowring Ladies Scottish Open	(Scotland) Dale Reid	Lost to par on second extra hole
3	1993	Hennessy Ladies Cup	(Sweden) Liselotte Neumann	Lost to birdie on first extra hole
4	1999	McDonalds WPGA Championship	(Sweden) Maria Hjorth	Won with par on second extra hole
5	1999	Donegal Irish Ladies Open	(Spain) Raquel Carriedo (Germany) Elisabeth Esterl (France) Sandrine Mendiburu	Mendiburu won with par on second extra hole Esterl eliminated by par on first extra hole
6	2002	P4 Norwegian Masters	(Spain) Ana Larraneta	Won with birdie on second extra hole
7	2009	UNIQA Ladies Golf Open	(Sweden) Linda Wessberg	Lost to bogey on second extra hole
8	2009	Carta Sì Ladies Italian Open	(Norway) Marianne Skarpnord	Lost to birdie on third extra hole
9	2010	Hero Honda Women's Indian Open	(South Africa) Tandi Cuningham (Sweden) Louise Friberg (Thailand) Nontaya Srisawang	Won with eagle on first extra hole
10	2012	UniCredit Ladies German Open	(France) Anne-Lise Caudal	Lost to birdie on second extra hole

=== LPGA of Japan Tour wins (7) ===
- 1988 (1) Itoki Classic
- 1994 (1) Itoen Ladies Open
- 1995 (1) Itoen Ladies Open
- 1996 (2) Satake Japan Classic, Itoen Ladies Open
- 1999 (1) Takara World Invitational
- 2001 (1) Itoen Ladies Open

=== ALPG Tour wins (8) ===
- 1993 (1) Australian Ladies Masters
- 1994 (1) Australian Ladies Masters
- 2003 (1) ANZ Ladies Masters^{1}
- 2004 (1) AAMI Women's Australian Open^{1}
- 2008 (1) LG Bing Lee Women's NSW Open
- 2009 (1) Women's Australian Open^{1}
- 2010 (2) Pegasus New Zealand Women's Open^{1}, Kangaroo Valley Resort Classic

=== Ladies Asian Golf Tour wins (2) ===
- 1993 (1) Thailand Ladies Open
- 1994 (1) Thailand Ladies Open

=== Other wins (4) ===
- 1996 (1) JCPenney/LPGA Skins Game
- 1998 (1) JCPenney/LPGA Skins Game
- 1999 (1) JCPenney Classic (with John Daly)
- 2008 (1) Lalla Meryem Cup

Note

- ^{1} Co-sanctioned by ALPG Tour and Ladies European Tour

=== Legends Tour wins (4) ===
Legend
Legends Tour major championships (2)
Other Legends Tour (2)

No.	Date	Tournament	Winning score	Margin of victory	Runner(s)-up
1	11 Nov 2012	ISPS Handa Legends Tour Open Championship	−5 (70-71=141)	2 strokes	(United States) Beth Daniel (United States) Barb Moxness
2	15 Jul 2018	U.S. Senior Women's Open	−16 (71-71-66-68=276)	10 strokes	(United States) Juli Inkster
3	7 Sep 2018	BJ's Charity Championship (with (England) Trish Johnson)	−10 (61)	2 strokes	(United States) Patti Rizzo and (United States) Michele Redman (United States) Donna Caponi and (United States) Laurie Rinker
4	17 Oct 2018	Senior LPGA Championship	−8 (68-70-70=208)	4 strokes	(Sweden) Helen Alfredsson (Italy) Silvia Cavalleri

== Major championships ==
=== Wins (4) ===
Year	Championship	54 holes	Winning score	Margin	Runner(s)-up
1987	U.S. Women's Open	1 shot deficit	−3 (72-70-72-71=285)	Playoff ^{1}	(United States) JoAnne Carner, (Japan) Ayako Okamoto
1994	McDonald's LPGA Championship	1 shot lead	−5 (70-72-69-68=279)	3 strokes	(United States) Alice Ritzman
1996	McDonald's LPGA Championship	2 shot deficit	E (72-71-70=213)	1 stroke	(United States) Julie Piers
1996	du Maurier Classic	5 shot deficit	−11 (71-70-70-66=277)	2 strokes	(United States) Nancy Lopez, (Australia) Karrie Webb

^{1} In an 18-hole playoff: Davies 71, Okamoto 73, Carner 74.

=== Results timeline ===
Results not in chronological order.

Tournament	1986	1987	1988	1989	1990	1991
Chevron Championship	CUT	T33	T21	T42	T44	T23
Women's PGA Championship			CUT	T65	CUT	T51
U.S. Women's Open	T11	1	T50	T7	T26	T44
du Maurier Classic			2	17	CUT	T3

Tournament	1992	1993	1994	1995	1996	1997	1998	1999	2000
Chevron Championship	CUT	T12	2	T3	T15	T16	T3	T70	T35
Women's PGA Championship	T52	T45	1	2	1	T4	T44	T7	T6
U.S. Women's Open	CUT	T11	T12	T24	6	CUT	T11	CUT	T9
du Maurier Classic	T20		T38	CUT	1	T16	T22	2	73

Tournament	2001	2002	2003	2004	2005	2006	2007	2008	2009
Chevron Championship	T11	T21	4	T16	T23	CUT	T20	T55	
Women's PGA Championship	T6	CUT	CUT	T42	T3	T65	T30	CUT	WD
U.S. Women's Open	CUT	T32	CUT	CUT	CUT	CUT	T32	CUT	T17
Women's British Open ^	T25	CUT	T19	T8	T29	T16	CUT	77	T46

Tournament	2010	2011	2012	2013	2014	2015	2016	2017	2018	2019	2020
Chevron Championship	T48	T57	CUT			CUT			CUT		
U.S. Women's Open		CUT			CUT	T47				CUT	
Women's PGA Championship	T47	T57	CUT	T64	T25	T53	CUT	CUT	CUT	CUT	72
The Evian Championship ^^				CUT	T41	T55	CUT	CUT	CUT	CUT	NT
Women's British Open ^	T69	CUT	WD	CUT	T9	CUT	CUT	T59	CUT	CUT	CUT

Tournament	2021	2022	2023
Chevron Championship			
Women's PGA Championship	CUT		CUT
U.S. Women's Open			
The Evian Championship ^^			
Women's British Open ^	66	CUT	WD

^ The Women's British Open replaced the du Maurier Classic as an LPGA major in 2001.
^^ The Evian Championship was added as a major in 2013.

Win
Top 10
Did not play

CUT = missed the half-way cut.
WD = withdrew
NT = no tournament
"T" = tied

=== Summary ===
Tournament	Wins	2nd	3rd	Top-5	Top-10	Top-25	Events	Cuts made
Chevron Championship	0	1	2	4	4	14	28	22
Women's PGA Championship	2	1	1	5	8	9	35	22
U.S. Women's Open	1	0	0	1	4	10	28	16
The Evian Championship	0	0	0	0	0	0	7	2
Women's British Open	0	0	0	0	2	5	23	11
du Maurier Classic	1	2	1	4	4	8	12	10
Totals	4	4	4	14	22	46	133	83

- Most consecutive cuts made – 11 (1992 du Maurier – 1994 U.S. Open)
- Longest streak of top-10s – 3 (1996 PGA – 1996 du Maurier)

== Senior major championships ==
=== Wins (2) ===
Year	Tournament	Winning score	Margin of victory	Runner(s)-up
2018	U.S. Senior Women's Open	−16 (71-71-66-68=276)	10 strokes	(United States) Juli Inkster
2018	Senior LPGA Championship	−8 (68-70-70=208)	4 strokes	(Sweden) Helen Alfredsson (Italy) Silvia Cavalleri

== LPGA Tour career summary ==
Year	Events played	Cuts made*	Wins	2nds	3rds	Top tens	Best finish	Earnings ($)	Rank	Scoring average	Scoring rank
1986	2	1	0	0	0	0	T11	5,805^{1}	n/a	74.67	n/a
1987	3	3	1	0	0	2	1	66,778^{1}	n/a	72.67	n/a
1988	21	15	2	1	0	4	1	160,382	15	72.98	
1989	19	17	1	1	1	9	1	181,874	13	71.87	
1990	17	12	0	1	0	1	T2	64,863	64	73.72	
1991	24	18	1	0	2	6	1	200,831	20	73.16	
1992	21	14	0	2	0	4	2	150,163	39	72.94	
1993	16	15	1	0	0	3	1	240,643	20	72.00	
1994	22	21	3	3	2	12	1	687,201	1	70.91	
1995	17	16	2	3	1	9	1	530,349	2	71.37	
1996	19	18	4	3	1	13	1	927,302	2	70.32	
1997	21	19	1	1	2	7	1	483,571	8	70.86	
1998	22	16	1	1	2	6	1	516,547	11	71.76	
1999	24	22	0	3	1	9	2	501,798	14	71.33	
2000	22	22	2	0	1	8	1	557,158	11	71.91	
2001	19	14	1	1	0	6	1	492,143	18	71.84	
2002	18	15	0	1	0	6	2	344,232	29	71.68	
2003	22	19	0	2	1	5	2	525,902	19	71.27	
2004	23	18	0	0	1	6	T3	351,961	36	71.04	T14
2005	22	18	0	0	2	3	T3	434,589	31	72.52	42
2006	19	12	0	1	0	1	T2	364,531	34	72.94	87
2007	24	22	0	1	2	6	2	692,010	21	71.71	13
2008	19	13	0	0	0	1	T9	112,914	95	73.16	100
2009	18	12	0	0	0	0	T17	97,681	87	73.56	114
2010	15	10	0	0	0	2	T6	88,211^{2}	78	72.55	55
2011	12	6	0	0	0	0	T37	26,499	111	73.74	98
2012	15	7	0	0	0	0	T18	42,161	107	74.07	112
2013	14	5	0	0	0	0	T42	23,803	119	73.74	128
2014	18	12	0	0	0	2	T4	200,515	68	72.48	86
2015	14	4	0	0	0	0	T47	39,359	119	73.86	133
2016	15	4	0	0	0	0	T43	19,949	151	72.95	117
2017	13	4	0	0	0	0	T59	18,742	155	72.97	145
2018	15	5	0	1	0	1	T2	129,750	92	73.06	144
2019	12	1	0	0	0	0	T24	13,814	161	74.92	157
2020	6	1	0	0	0	0	72	8,295	156	76.14	n/a
2021	11	4	0	0	0	0	T43	25,024	153	75.24	155
2022	5	0	0	0	0	0	MC	0	n/a	76.75	n/a
2023	3	0	0	0	0	0	MC	0	n/a	79.00	n/a

- official as of 2023 season

* Includes match play and other events without a cut.
^{1} Davies played in 1986 and 1987 as non-member of the LPGA Tour, why her money won was considered unofficial.
^{2} Davies's earnings of $37,549 at the 2010 Honda PTT LPGA Thailand were considered unofficial under LPGA rules and are not included in this total.

== Ladies European Tour career summary ==
Year	Tournaments played	Cuts made^{4}	Wins	2nd	3rd	Top 10s	Best finish	Earnings	Order of Merit rank	Scoring average	Scoring rank
1985	20	11	1	3	0	10	1	£21,736	1		
1986	19	19	4	2	0	13	1	£37,500	1	72.09	1
1987	13	13	1	3	2	13	1	£47,151	2	72.38	
1988	10	10	3	1	0	8	1	£41,871	8	71.59	
1989	10	9	1	0	0	3	1	£21,608	19	72.63	
1990	12	12	1	0	2	6	1	£36,697	13	72.81	
1991	12	11	1	2	1	6	1	£49,552	5	72.02	
1992	9	9	3	1	2	8	1	£66,333	1	70.35	1
1993	10	10	1	1	0	10	1	£64,938	2	71.63	1
1994	7	7	2	0	1	6	1	£59,384	3	71.43	
1995	9	9	4	1	0	7	1	£100,725	2	69.94	
1996	8	8	2	0	1	6	1	£110,880	1	70.63	
1997	6	6	2	0	0	3	1	£77,424	4	71.97	T4
1998	7	6	1	1	1	5	1	£70,918	5	71.96	1
1999	8	8	3	3	0	6	1	£204,521	1	70.50	1
2000	9^{1}	9^{1}	1^{1}	0	1	6^{1}	1^{1}	£52,289^{1}	13^{2}	71.60	6
2001	9	8	1	0	1	3	1	£165,371	11^{2}	71.86	9
2002	7	5	1	0	0	4	1	€116,655	9^{2}	72.00	11
2003	7	7	1	2	0	4	1	€171,703	3^{2}	71.08	6
2004	8	8	1	1	0	6	1	€242,401	1^{2}	70.31	1
2005	7	7	0	1	3	4	T2	€124,666	8	70.35	1
2006	11	11	1	6	0	8	1	€149,302	1	69.50	2
2007	10	8	1	1	0	5	1	€149,302	12	71.97	4
2008	12	12	1	0	1	6	1	€139,013	11	71.54	15
2009	10	9	1	1	0	6	1	€152,505	8	71.29	9
2010	18	16	5	1	1	9	1	€311,573	2	71.19	5
2011	18	15	0	1	0	2	T2	€50,363	48	72.09	37
2012	17	16	0	2	1	4	2	€130,293	9	71.88	11
2013	12	8	0	0	0	3	5	€59,141	33	72.17	31
2014	11	8	0	0	1	3	3	106,565	10	72.78	57
2015	11	9	0	0	1	2	3	€66,813	22	73,22	
2016	13	4	0	0	0	0	T12	€17,385	83^{2}	73.84	105
2017	8	5	0	0	0	0	T19	€22,404	55^{2}	72.23	56
2018	8	4	0	0	0	0	T16	€10,862	75^{2}	73.55	106
2019	7	3	0	0	0	0	T24	€16,811	78^{2}	74.63	93
2020	6	3	0	0	0	0	T15	€13,778	87^{2}	73.94	64
2021	6	6	0	0	0	0	T15	€27,835^{3}	119^{2,3}	73.33^{3}	60^{3}
2022	5	1	0	0	0	0	64	€1,265	204^{2}	76.40	–
2023	2	0	0	0	0	0	CUT	0	–	81.50	–

^{1} Davies's 2000 LET appearances, cuts made, wins, top tens, best finish and earnings include her win at the individual event at the 2000 TSN Ladies World Cup Golf with a first prize of £25,000, which was considered unofficial in the Order of Merit but counted among her LET wins.
^{2} 2000–2004 and 2018–2022 LET Order of Merit rankings were decided by a points system.
^{3} Five tournaments included in 2021 LET earnings, Order of Merit and scoring average, not including 2021 Aramco Team Series - Jeddah.
^{4} Includes match play and other events without a cut.

== Team appearances ==
Amateur

- European Lady Junior's Team Championship (representing England): 1983 (winners), 1984
- Curtis Cup (representing Great Britain & Ireland): 1984

Professional

- Solheim Cup (representing Europe): 1990, 1992 (winners), 1994, 1996, 1998, 2000 (winners), 2002, 2003 (winners), 2005, 2007, 2009, 2011 (winners)
- Praia d'El Rey European Cup (representing Ladies European Tour): 1999 (winners)
- World Cup (representing England): 2000, 2005, 2006, 2007
- Lexus Cup (representing International team): 2006
- Handa Cup (representing World team): 2013 (winners), 2014, 2015
- The Queens (representing Europe): 2015 (playing captain)
- European Championships (representing Great Britain): 2018

=== Solheim Cup record ===
Year	Total matches	Total W–L–H	Singles W–L–H	Foursomes W–L–H	Fourballs W–L–H	Points won	Points %
Career	46	22–18–6	5–5–2	8–6–1	9–7–3	25	54.35%
1990	3	2–1–0	1–0–0 def. R. Jones 3&2	1–0–0 won w/ A. Nicholas 2&1	0–1–0 lost w/ A. Nicholas 4&3	2	66.7%
1992	3	3–0–0	1–0–0 def. B. Burton 4&2	1–0–0 won w/ A. Nicholas 1 up	1–0–0 won w/ A. Nicholas 1 up	3	100%
1994	3	1–2–0	0–1–0 lost to B. Burton 1 dn	1–0–0 won w/ A. Nicholas 2&1	0–1–0 lost w/ A. Nicholas 2&1	1	33.3%
1996	5	3–2–0	0–1–0 lost to M. McGann 3&2	1–1–0 lost w/ A. Nicholas 1 dn, won w/ T. Johnson 4&3	2–0–0 won w/ T. Johnson 6&5, won w/ L. Hackney 6&5	3	60%
1998	5	3–1–1	1–0–0 def. P. Hurst 1 up	1–1–0 lost w/ T. Johnson 3&1, won w/ C. Sörenstam, 3&2	1–0–1 halved w/ C. Sörenstam, won w/ L. Hackney 2up	3.5	70%
2000	4	1–2–1	0–1–0 lost to K. Robbins 3&2	1–1–0 won w/ A. Nicholas 4&3, lost w/ A. Nicholas 6&5	0–0–1 halved w/ R. Carriedo	1.5	37.5%
2002	5	2–3–0	0–1–0 lost to M. Mallon 3&2	1–1–0 won w/ P. Martí 2 up, lost w/ P. Martí 2&1	1–1–0 lost w/ P. Martí 1 dn, won w/ S. Gustafson 1up	2	40%
2003	4	1–2–1	1–0–0 def. M. Mallon, conceded on 15	0–0–1 halved w/ C. Koch	0–2–0 lost w/ C. Matthew 2&1, lost w/ S.Gustafson 2&1	1.5	37.5%
2005	5	3–2–0	0–1–0 lost to P. Creamer 7&5	1–1–0 won w/ M. Hjorth 2&1, lost w/ M. Hjorth 3&2	2–0–0 won w/ S. Pettersen 4&3, won w/ A. Sörenstam 4&2	3	60%
2007	4	2–1–1	1–0–0 def B. Lincicome 4&3	0–1–0 lost w/ B. Brewerton 2&1	1–0–1 halved w/ T. Johnson, won w/ B. Brewerton 2 up	2.5	62.5%
2009	2	0–1–1	0–0–1 halved with B. Lang		0–1–0 lost w/ B. Brewerton 5&4	0.5	25%
2011	3	1–1–1	0–0–1 halved with J. Inkster		1–1–0 lost w/ M. Reid 1 dn, won w/ M. Reid 4&3	1.5	50%

== See also ==
- List of golfers with most Ladies European Tour wins
- List of golfers with most LPGA Tour wins
- List of golfers with most LPGA major championship wins
