= Amaia Arruti =

Spanish professional golfer

Personal information
- Nationality: Spain
- Born: 8 August 1970 (age 56) San Sebastián, Spain

Career
- Sport: Golf
- Turned professional: 1992
- Former tours: Ladies European Tour (1993–2002)
- Professional wins: 2

Number of wins by tour
- Ladies European Tour: 1
- Other: 1
Medal record
Mediterranean Games
Bronze medal – third place	1991 Athens	Women's team

Amaia Arruti (born 8 August 1970) is a Spanish professional golfer. She played on the Ladies European Tour 1993–2002, and won the Ladies Italian Open in 1993.

== Early life and family ==
Arruti was born in San Sebastián in 1970 and started playing golf at the age of seven, as her father José Arruti Lizaso was a club pro at Real Golf Club de San Sebastián.

Her sister Marina also played on the Ladies European Tour, and her father's twin brother Jesús Arruti Lizaso's son Jesús María has played on the European Tour.

Arruti plays right-handed, but switches to left-handed for putting.

== Amateur career ==
In 1990, Arruti lost the final of the Spanish International Ladies Amateur Championship to Delphine Bourson, 4 and 3, and was runner-up at the European Ladies Amateur Championship in Switzerland a stroke behind Martina Koch.

Arruti won bronze at the 1991 Mediterranean Games in Athens, Greece in the team event together with Esther Valera and Macarena Campomanes.

== Professional career ==
Arruti turned professional on 1 December 1992 and joined the Ladies European Tour.

In 1993, her rookie season, she beat Annika Sörenstam by two strokes to win the Ladies Italian Open at Golf Club Lignano near Venice. However, at the end of the season she lost out on the LET Rookie of the Year award to Sörenstam.

In 1995, she won the Lalla Meryem Cup in Morocco, and was runner-up at the Italian Ladies' Open, held at Il Picciolo Golf Club in Sicily, a stroke behind Denise Booker.

== Professional wins (2) ==
=== Ladies European Tour (1) ===
No.	Date	Tournament	Winning score	To par	Margin of victory	Runner-up
1	19 Sep 1993	BMW Ladies Italian Open	270	−18	2 strokes	(Sweden) Annika Sörenstam

=== Other wins (1) ===
- 1995 Lalla Meryem Cup (unofficial limited-field LET event)
