= Laura Davies Invitational =

Tournament information
- Location: England
- Established: 1999
- Course: Brocket Hall GC
- Par: 72
- Tour: Ladies European Tour
- Format: 72-hole Stroke play
- Final year: 1999

Final champion
- (Sweden) Sofia Grönberg-Whitmore

The Laura Davies Invitational was a women's professional golf tournament on the Ladies European Tour that took place at Brocket Hall GC in England.

== Winners ==
Year	Winner	Country	Score	Margin of victory	Runner-up
1999	Sofia Grönberg-Whitmore	Sweden	275 (−13)	Playoff	(England) Trish Johnson
