= Austrian Ladies Open =

Professional golf tournament

Tournament information
- Location: Stegersbach, Austria
- Established: 1994
- Course: Golfschaukel Stegersbach
- Par: 70
- Tours: Ladies European Tour; LET Access Series
- Format: Stroke play
- Prize fund: €50,000
- Month played: May

Current champion
- (Germany) Hanna Tauber

Final champion
- Location in Europe Location in Austria

The Austrian Ladies Open is a professional golf tournament held in Austria. It was an event on the Ladies European Tour first played in 1994 and last played in 2012, before returning as an LET Access Series event in 2025.

== Winners ==
Year	Tour (Note: LET – Ladies European Tour; LETAS – LET Access Series.)	Date	Winner	Score	To par	Margin of victory	Runner(s)-up	Winner's share (€)	Venue
Allegria Stegersbach Ladies Open
2026	LETAS	22 May	(Germany) Hanna Tauber	207	–3	2 strokes	(Iceland) Ragga Kristinsdottir	7,500	Golfschaukel Stegersbach
2025	LETAS	23 May	(England) Gemma Clews	207	–3	1 stroke	(Austria) Katharina Muehlbauer	7,500	Golfschaukel Stegersbach
2013–2024: No tournament
UNIQA Ladies Golf Open
2012	LET	9 Sep	(Sweden) Caroline Hedwall (2)	203	−13	4 strokes	(England) Laura Davies	30,000	GC Föhrenwald-Wiener Neustadt
2012	LET	9 Sep	(Sweden) Caroline Hedwall (2)	203	−13	4 strokes	(Sweden) Mikaela Parmlid	30,000	GC Föhrenwald-Wiener Neustadt
2011	LET	4 Sep	(Sweden) Caroline Hedwall	204	−12	4 strokes	(Netherlands) Caroline Afonso	30,000	GC Föhrenwald-Wiener Neustadt
2010	LET	5 Sep	(England) Laura Davies (3)	205	−11	1 stroke	(France) Virginie Lagoutte-Clément	30,000	GC Föhrenwald-Wiener Neustadt
2009	LET	13 Sep	(Sweden) Linda Wessberg	279	−9	Playoff	(England) Laura Davies	37,500	GC Föhrenwald-Wiener Neustadt
2008	LET	14 Sep	(England) Laura Davies (2)	273	−15	3 strokes	(England) Lisa Hall	37,500	GC Föhrenwald-Wiener Neustadt
2007	LET	29 Sep	(England) Laura Davies	200	−16	4 strokes	(Sweden) Sophie Gustafson	37,500	GC Föhrenwald-Wiener Neustadt
Siemens Austrian Ladies Open
2006	LET	17 Sep	(Sweden) Sophie Gustafson	271	−17	3 strokes	(England) Laura Davies	37,500	GC Föhrenwald-Wiener Neustadt
2005	LET	29 May	(Italy) Federica Piovano	272	−16	1 stroke	(France) Gwladys Nocera	37,500	GC Föhrenwald-Wiener Neustadt
2001–2004: No tournament
Ladies Austrian Open
2000	LET	15 Jul	(France) Patricia Meunier-Lebouc	206	−10	1 stroke	(England) Trish Johnson	15,000	Steiermärksischer GC Murhof
2000	LET	15 Jul	(France) Patricia Meunier-Lebouc	206	−10	1 stroke	(Sweden) Lisa Hed	15,000	Steiermärksischer GC Murhof
2000	LET	15 Jul	(France) Patricia Meunier-Lebouc	206	−10	1 stroke	(Spain) Ana Belén Sánchez	15,000	Steiermärksischer GC Murhof
1999	LET	17 Jul	(Spain) Marina Arruti	203	−13	2 strokes	(Scotland) Dale Reid	15,000	Steiermärksischer GC Murhof
1999	LET	17 Jul	(Spain) Marina Arruti	203	−13	2 strokes	(Germany) Elisabeth Esterl	15,000	Steiermärksischer GC Murhof
Chrysler Ladies Austrian Open
1998	LET	18 Jul	(New Zealand) Lynnette Brooky	203	−13	1 stroke	(England) Trish Johnson	12,000	Steiermärkischer GC Murhof
1997: No tournament
Glashütte Ladies' Austrian Open
1996	LET	30 Jun	(Germany) Martina Koch	213	−6	2 strokes	(New Zealand) Lynnette Brooky	9,000	Colony Club Gutenhof
OVB Damen Open Austria
1995	LET	18 Jun	(Sweden) Annika Sörenstam	270	−22	3 strokes	(England) Laura Davies	15,000	Golf Club Zell am See – Kaprun
1994	LET	19 Jun	(Belgium) Florence Descampe	277	−15	Playoff	(United States) Tracy Hanson	15,000	Golf Club Zell am See – Kaprun
