= Ladies Italian Open =

Golf tournament in Italy

Tournament information
- Location: Monza, Lombardy, Italy
- Established: 1987
- Course: Golf Club Milano
- Par: 72
- Tour: Ladies European Tour
- Format: Stroke play
- Prize fund: €350,000
- Month played: September

Tournament record score
- Aggregate: 269 Laura Davies
- To par: −19 as above

Current champion
- (South Africa) Casandra Alexander

Location map
- Location in Italy Location in Lombardy

The Ladies Italian Open (Italian: Open d'Italia Femminile) is a professional golf tournament on the Ladies European Tour held in Italy since 1987.

After a six-year hiatus, the tournament returned to the LET schedule in 2021. In 2024, it moved to Golf Nazionale near Rome, and in 2026 to Monza near Milan.

== Winners ==
| Year | Venue | Winner | Country | Score | Margin of victory | Runner(s)-up | Country |
Buccellati Ladies Italian Open
| 2026 | Golf Club Milano | Casandra Alexander | South Africa | 204 (−12) | 3 strokes | Sophie Hausmann | Germany |
| 2026 | Golf Club Milano | Casandra Alexander | South Africa | 204 (−12) | 3 strokes | Anna Morgan | United States |
| 2025 | No tournament | | | | | | |
Ladies Italian Open
| 2024 | Golf Nazionale | Amy Taylor | England | 206 (−10) | 1 stroke | María Hernández | Spain |
| 2023 | No tournament | | | | | | |
| 2022 | Margara G&CC | Morgane Métraux | Switzerland | 206 (−10) | Playoff (Note: Métraux eagled the first extra hole to win the three-way playoff) | Alessandra Fanali (a) | Italy |
| 2022 | Margara G&CC | Morgane Métraux | Switzerland | 206 (−10) | Playoff | Meghan MacLaren | England |
| 2021 | Margara G&CC | Lucie Malchirand (a) | France | 209 (−7) | 1 stroke | Gabriella Cowley | England |
| 2021 | Margara G&CC | Lucie Malchirand (a) | France | 209 (−7) | 1 stroke | Ursula Wikström | Finland |
2015–20: No tournament
| 2014 | Perugia Golf Club | Florentyna Parker | England | 209 (−7) | 1 stroke | Holly Clyburn | England |
2012–13: No tournament
Sicilian Ladies Italian Open
| 2011 | Il Picciolo | Christina Kim | United States | 209 (−7) | 4 strokes | Giulia Sergas | Italy |
| 2010 | No tournament | | | | | | |
CartaSì Ladies Italian Open
| 2009 | Le Rovedine Milano | Marianne Skarpnord | Norway | 204 (−12) | Playoff (Note: Skarpnord beat Davies by rolling in a six-foot birdie putt at the third playoff hole) | Laura Davies | England |
BMW Ladies Italian Open
| 2008 | Argentario | Martina Eberl | Germany | 275 (−9) | 5 strokes | Carmen Alonso | Spain |
| 2007 | Parco de' Medici | Trish Johnson | England | 273 (−15) | 1 stroke | Bettina Hauert | Germany |
| 2006 | Parco de' Medici | Gwladys Nocera | France | 274 (−14) | 2 strokes | Sophie Giquel | France |
| 2005 | Parco de' Medici | Iben Tinning (2) | Denmark | 271 (−17) | 1 stroke | Veronica Zorzi | Italy |
| 2004 | Parco di Roma | Ana Belén Sánchez | Spain | 281 (−7) | 1 stroke | Martina Eberl | Germany |
La Perla Ladies Italian Open
| 2003 | Poggio dei Medici | Ludivine Kreutz | France | 282 (−10) | 1 stroke | Elisabeth Esterl | Germany |
| 2003 | Poggio dei Medici | Ludivine Kreutz | France | 282 (−10) | 1 stroke | Karen Lunn | Australia |
| 2003 | Poggio dei Medici | Ludivine Kreutz | France | 282 (−10) | 1 stroke | Anne-Marie Knight | Australia |
| 2002 | Poggio dei Medici | Iben Tinning | Denmark | 278 (−14) | 1 stroke | Sophie Gustafson | Sweden |
| 2001 | Poggio dei Medici | Paula Martí | Spain | 283 (−9) | Playoff (Note: Martí won with par on the first playoff hole) | Raquel Carriedo | Spain |
Ladies Italian Open
| 2000 | Poggio dei Medici | Sophie Gustafson | Sweden | 284 (−8) | 3 strokes | Valérie Van Ryckeghem | Belgium |
| 2000 | Poggio dei Medici | Sophie Gustafson | Sweden | 284 (−8) | 3 strokes | Silvia Cavalleri | Italy |
| 1999 | Poggio dei Medici | Samantha Head | England | 214 (−5) | 1 stroke | Marina Arruti | Spain |
| 1999 | Poggio dei Medici | Samantha Head | England | 214 (−5) | 1 stroke | Patricia Meunier-Lebouc | France |
| 1999 | Poggio dei Medici | Samantha Head | England | 214 (−5) | 1 stroke | Mette Hageman | Netherlands |
| 1999 | Poggio dei Medici | Samantha Head | England | 214 (−5) | 1 stroke | Riikka Hakkarainen | Finland |
| 1999 | Poggio dei Medici | Samantha Head | England | 214 (−5) | 1 stroke | Trish Johnson | England |
| 1998 | No tournament | | | | | | |
Sicilian Ladies' Open/Italian Ladies' Open
| 1997 | Il Picciolo | Valérie Van Ryckeghem | Belgium | 288 (−4) | Playoff | Patricia Gonzalez | Colombia |
Italian Ladies' Open di Sicilia
| 1996 | Il Picciolo | Laura Davies | England | 282 (−10) | 3 strokes | Tina Fischer | Germany |
| 1996 | Il Picciolo | Laura Davies | England | 282 (−10) | 3 strokes | Fiona Pike | England |
Italian Ladies' Open
| 1995 | Il Picciolo | Denise Booker | Australia | 284 (−8) | 1 stroke | Amaia Arruti | Spain |
BMW Italian Ladies' Open
| 1994 | Lignano | Corinne Dibnah (2) | Australia | 277 (−11) | Playoff | Dale Reid | Scotland |
| 1993 | Lignano | Amaia Arruti | Spain | 270 (−18) | 2 strokes | Annika Sörenstam | Sweden |
| 1992 | Frassenelle | Laura Davies (3) | England | 274 (−14) | 5 strokes | Sandrine Mendiburu | France |
| 1991 | Albarella | Corinne Dibnah | Australia | 272 (−16) | 3 strokes | Florence Descampe | Belgium |
Italian Ladies' Open
| 1990 | Gardagolf | Florence Descampe | Belgium | 282 (−6) | 3 strokes | Helen Alfredsson | Sweden |
| 1989 | Carimate | Xonia Wunsch-Ruiz | Spain | 278 (−10) | 2 strokes | Jane Connachan | Scotland |
| 1988 | Ca' della Nave | Laura Davies (2) | England | 269 (−19) | 9 strokes | Marie-Laure de Lorenzi | France |
| 1988 | Ca' della Nave | Laura Davies (2) | England | 269 (−19) | 9 strokes | Kitrina Douglas | England |
| 1988 | Ca' della Nave | Laura Davies (2) | England | 269 (−19) | 9 strokes | Dale Reid | Scotland |
| 1987 | Croara | Laura Davies | England | 285 (−3) | 1 stroke | Liselotte Neumann | Sweden |

== See also ==
- Italian Open
