= Anne-Marie Knight =

Australian professional golfer (born 1970

Personal information
- Nationality: Australia
- Born: 18 August 1970 (age 56)

Career
- Sport: Golf
- Turned professional: 1995
- Former tours: Ladies European Tour (1996–2006); ALPG Tour; LPGA Tour
- Professional wins: 1

Number of wins by tour
- Ladies European Tour: 1

Best results in LPGA major championships
- Chevron Championship: DNP
- Women's PGA C'ship: DNP
- U.S. Women's Open: CUT: 2004
- du Maurier Classic: DNP
- Women's British Open: CUT: 2003, 2004, 2005

Achievements and awards
- Ladies European Tour Rookie of the Year: 1996

Anne-Marie Knight (born 18 August 1970) is an Australian professional golfer who played on the Ladies European Tour (LET) 1996–2006. She was the 1996 LET Rookie of the Year and won the 1999 Ladies' German Open.

== Ameteur career ==
Knight had a successful amateur career and won the 1993 Australian Women's Amateur. In 1995, she was runner-up at the U.S. Women's Amateur at Brookline, having lost the final to Kelli Kuehne, 4 and 3.

She represented Australia at the 1991 Tasman Cup, the Queen Sirikit Cup in China (1992) and Indonesia (1994), the 1994 Espirito Santo Trophy at Le Golf National in Paris, and won the 1995 Astor Trophy at Royal Sydney Golf Club.

== Professional career ==
Knight turned professional in 1995 and finished second in the Q-School at La Manga to join the Ladies European Tour in 1996. She became the LET Rookie of the Year, following three runner-up finishes at the Women's Welsh Open, Danish Ladies Open and Ladies European Open.

In 1997, she was solo runner-up at the 1997 Hennessy Ladies Cup, a stroke behind Laura Davies, and finished a career best 8th in the Order of Merit. She won the Ladies' German Open in 1999, shooting a course record 64 in the final round to finish a stroke ahead of Laura Davies and Sophie Gustafson. In 2003, she was runner-up at the Ladies Italian Open, one stroke behind Ludivine Kreutz.

Knight was the third ranked Australian player ahead of the inaugural Women's World Cup of Golf in 2005, losing out on selection to Karrie Webb and Wendy Doolan.

She also made 11 appearances in LPGA Tour events between 1997 and 1999.

After retiring from professional touring in 2007, Knight became the head teaching professional at West Beach Parks Golf in Adelaide.

== Ameteur wins ==
- 1989 South Australian State Junior Championship
- 1990 South Australian Amateur Championship, New Zealand Junior Championship
- 1991 South Australian Amateur Championship
- 1992 South Australian Amateur Championship
- 1993 Australian Women's Amateur

== Professional wins (1) ==
=== Ladies European Tour wins (1) ===
No.	Date	Tournament	Winning score	To par	Margin of victory	Runners-up
1	25 Jul 1999	stilwerk Ladies' German Open	74-69-71-64=278	−10	1 stroke	(England) Laura Davies (Sweden) Sophie Gustafson

== Results in LPGA majors ==
Tournament	2003	2004	2005
U.S. Women's Open		CUT	
Women's British Open	CUT	CUT	CUT

Note: Knight only played in the Opens.

Did not play

CUT = missed the half-way cut

== Team appearances ==
Amateur

- Tasman Cup (representing Australia): 1991
- Queen Sirikit Cup (representing Australia): 1992, 1994
- Espirito Santo Trophy (representing Australia): 1994
- Astor Trophy (representing Australia): 1995 (winners)
