= Sophie Gustafson =

Swedish professional golfer (born 1973)

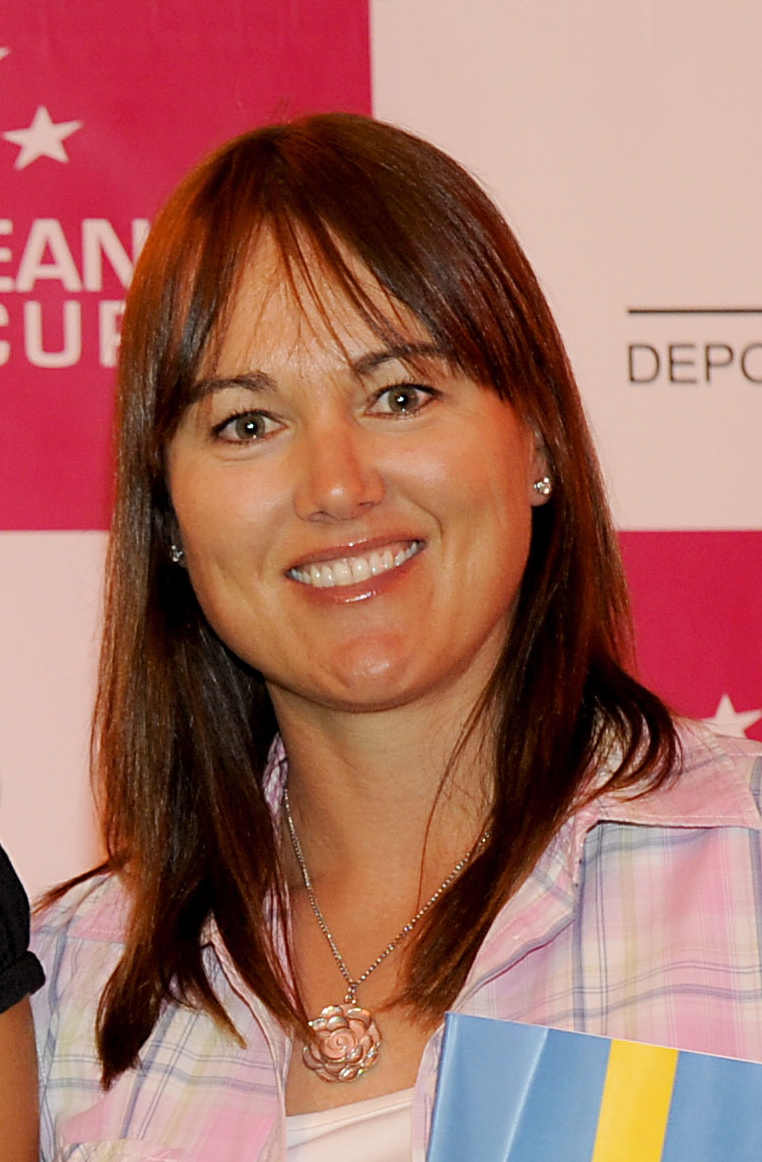
- Gustafson in 2011

Personal information
- Nationality: Sweden
- Born: 27 December 1973 (age 52) Varberg, Sweden
- Height: 5 ft 10 in (1.78 m)
- Spouse: Ty Votaw (2006–10)

Career
- Sport: Golf
- Turned professional: 1992
- Former tours: Ladies European Tour (joined 1994); LPGA Tour (joined 1998)
- Professional wins: 26

Number of wins by tour
- LPGA Tour: 5
- Ladies European Tour: 16 (6th all-time)
- Ladies Asian Golf Tour: 1
- Other: 5

Best results in LPGA major championships
- Chevron Championship: T7: 2001
- Women's PGA C'ship: T6: 2007
- U.S. Women's Open: T10: 2006
- du Maurier Classic: T33: 2000
- Women's British Open: 2nd/T2: 2005, 2006
- Evian Championship: CUT: 2013

Achievements and awards
- Ladies European Tour Player of the Year: 1998, 2000, 2003
- Ladies European Tour Order of Merit winner: 2000, 2003, 2007, 2009
- Ladies European Tour Stroke Average trophy: 2000, 2002, 2003, 2007
- Swedish Golfer of the Year: 2000
- Heather Farr Player Award: 2012

Sophie Gustafson (born 27 December 1973) is a Swedish professional golfer. She was a member of the U.S.-based LPGA Tour and is a life member of the Ladies European Tour (LET). She has five LPGA Tour and 23 international wins in her career, including victories on five of the six continents on which golf is played: North America, Europe, Australia, Africa and Asia. She is a four-time LET Order of Merit winner and represented Europe in the Solheim Cup on each team from 1998 to 2011. She won the Women's British Open in 2000, the year before it was recognized as a major championship by the LPGA Tour and finished runner-up in 2005 and 2006.

== Early life ==
Gustafson grew up in Särö, outside Kungsbacka on the west coast of Sweden. At young ages, she practiced many different sports with her two elder brothers – football, tennis, table tennis, ice hockey, sailing and figure skating. When she was ten years old, a 9-hole golf course was built close to her home and Gustafson and her family began playing. At 14 years of age, she quit other sports, to concentrate on golf and got the opportunity to represent nearby situated Kungsbacka Golf Club, with 27 holes and better practice facilities. Showing great talent, she turned professional at 18 years of age in 1992, whilst studying marketing, economics and law at Aranäs High School in Kungsbacka.

== Professional career ==
In 1993 she won the Swedish Junior Match-play Championship, which at the time, due to Sweden's "open golf"-policy was not restricted to amateurs only, but it was without prize-money and unique that it was won by a young professional.

From 1992 to 1994, Gustafson played 12 Telia Tour and four Ladies European Tour tournaments. On the Telia Tour, she had six top-10 finishes. Her best finish on the Ladies European Tour was a 22nd at her home tournament in Sweden.

1995 saw her join the Ladies European Tour gaining two top-10 finishes in 13 starts. 1996 was her first full year on the Ladies European Tour. She gained her first professional wins, winning once on the Telia Tour at the Rörstrand Ladies Open and once on the Ladies European Tour at the Déesse Ladies Swiss Open. In 1997 she earned her first win on the Ladies Asian Tour at the Thailand Ladies Open and finished T40th at LPGA Q School to earn non-exempt status for 1998.

In 1998 Gustafson won twice on the LET at the Donegal Irish Ladies' Open and at the Marrakech Palmeraie Open, finish second on the Order of Merit and was voted Waterford Players' Player of the Year. She also played four times on the LPGA Tour, recording a second-place finish at the co-sanctioned Women's British Open. She also won the Telia Tour Finale and made her debut in the Solheim Cup, replacing the injured Trish Johnson at the last minute. During 1999, Gustafson played on both the LPGA and Ladies European Tours. Her best result was a tie for second at the Ladies' German Open on the Ladies European Tour.

2000 was a breakthrough year for Gustafson. She got her maiden win on the LPGA Tour at the Chick-fil-A Charity Championship, and added a second LPGA title at the co-sanctioned Women's British Open. She had two other wins in Europe at the Ladies Italian Open and at the Waterford Crystal Ladies' Irish Open, and partnered with Carin Koch to win the inaugural TSN Ladies World Cup Golf. She also won 2 and a half out of a possible four points in Europe's Solheim Cup victory at Loch Lomond. The year ended with Gustafson topping the Evian Order of Merit and official Evian moneylist and becoming Players' Player of Year'.

In 2001 Gustafson won once on both the LPGA Tour at the Subaru Memorial of Naples and Ladies European Tour at the AAMI Women's Australian Open crossing the LPGA Tour career $1million earnings mark. The defence of her LPGA title ended with her losing in a playoff to Annika Sörenstam. In 2002, she played seven LET events, posting four top-10 finishes, ending the season with one victory at the Biarritz Ladies Classic and third place in the Order of Merit as well as winning the Vivien Saunders Stroke average trophy. She made 15 of 20 cuts on the LPGA, with her best finish an 11th.

In 2003, she won three out of eight LET events and secured another LET Order of Merit title. She also won her third LET Players' Player of the Year award and the Vivien Saunders Stroke Average trophy. She won the Samsung World Championship on the LPGA tour, her 4th LPGA win, crossing the $2million LPGA Tour career earnings mark. She became the first woman to compete in a men's Japan Golf Tour event, and was part of the winning European Solheim Cup team in her native Sweden.

During 2004 Gustafson struggled with illness due to deep vein thrombosis in her leg. Her best finish of the year was a tie for third on the LPGA tour where she led the tour in driving distance at 270.2 yards. At the start of 2005, Gustafson represented Sweden with Carin Koch in the 2005 Women's World Cup of Golf in SA. Three LET events in 2005 yielded a second-place finish at the Weetabix Women's British Open and 3rd place on the LET Money List. On the LPGA Tour she had seven top 10 finishes and tied her career low round of 64 at the Wendy's Championship for Children. Gustafson made her 5th appearance in the Solheim Cup. and was a member of the winning International Team in the inaugural Lexus Cup.

In 2006 Gustafson played in just three LET events but finished fourth on the New Star Money List after claiming her first victory in almost three years at the Siemens Austrian Ladies Golf Open at Golfclub Fohrenwald in Wiener Neustadt in Austria. This win gave her the point she needed to become a Life Member of the LET. She earned her thirteenth LET win in 2007 at the De Vere Ladies Scottish Open.

Gustafson was a member of the European Solheim Cup team in 1998, 2000, 2002, 2003, 2005, 2007, 2009 and 2011.

== Awards, honors ==
In 1998, she earned Elite Sign No. 116 by the Swedish Golf Federation, on the basis of national team appearances and national championship performances.

In 2000, Gustafson was voted Swedish Golfer of the Year, professional or amateur, male or female, by the Association of Swedish Golf Writers.

As receipant number 26, Gustafson was in 2001 awarded the Golden Club by the Swedish Golf Federation for outstanding contributions to Swedish golf.

In 2004, she was awarded honorary member of the PGA of Sweden.

== Personal life ==
In 2006, Gustafson married former LPGA commissioner Ty Votaw, who left his post following the 2005 Solheim Cup. They divorced in January 2010.

Gustafson, in her words, has a "severe stuttering problem" and rarely speaks to the media. During the 2011 Solheim Cup she made an exception and spoke on-camera with Golf Channel.

During her LPGA Tour career, she lived in Orlando, Florida. After retiring, she moved back to Särö, Sweden.

Since 2015, Gustafson only played in a few tournaments. Instead she began a career as a caddie for LET player Beth Allen. They parted ways after the U.S. Women's Open in July 2017.

Gustafson is interested in driving motorcycle.

== Amateur wins ==
- 1993 Swedish Junior Match-play Championship

== Professional wins (26) ==
=== LPGA Tour wins (5) ===
No.	Date	Tournament	Winning score	Margin of victory	Runner(s)-up
1	30 Apr 2000	Chick-fil-A Charity Championship	−10 (65-69-72=206)	1 stroke	(United States) Amy Fruhwirth (United States) Kelly Robbins
2	20 Aug 2000	Women's British Open^{1}	−10 (70-66-71-75=282)	2 strokes	(United States) Becky Iverson (England) Kirsty Taylor
3	21 Jan 2001	Subaru Memorial of Naples	−16 (68-64-70-70=272)	3 strokes	(Australia) Karrie Webb
4	12 Oct 2003	Samsung World Championship	−14 (72-69-69-64=274)	2 strokes	(United States) Beth Daniel (Australia) Rachel Hetherington
5	27 Sep 2009	CVS/pharmacy LPGA Challenge	−20 (65-69-66-68=268)	4 strokes	(Mexico) Lorena Ochoa

LPGA Tour playoff record (0–4)

No.	Year	Tournament	Opponent(s)	Result
1	2000	Mizuno Classic	(Canada) Lorie Kane	Lost to birdie on first extra hole
2	2001	Chick-fil-A Charity Championship	(Sweden) Annika Sörenstam	Lost to par on second extra hole
3	2008	Safeway Classic	(Sweden) Helen Alfredsson (United States) Cristie Kerr	Kerr won with birdie on first extra hole
4	2009	Evian Masters^{1}	(Japan) Ai Miyazato	Lost to birdie on first extra hole

=== Ladies European Tour wins (16) ===
No.	Date	Tournament	Winning score	Margin of victory	Runner(s)-up
1	16 Jun 1996	Deesse Ladies' Swiss Open	−12 (69-69-73-69=280)	1 stroke	(England) Lisa Hackney
2	6 Sep 1998	Donegal Irish Ladies' Open	−2 (68-78-68=214)	Playoff	(Denmark) Iben Tinning
3	25 Oct 1998	Marrakech Palmeraie Open	−15 (66-67-68=201)	2 strokes	(France) Marie-Laure de Lorenzi
4	21 May 2000	Ladies Italian Open	−8 (69-74-69-72=284)	3 strokes	(Italy) Silvia Cavalleri (Belgium) Valérie Van Ryckeghem
5	11 Jun 2000	Waterford Crystal Irish Open	−6 (71-71-71-69=282)	1 stroke	(France) Marine Monnet
6	20 Aug 2000	Women's British Open^{1}	−10 (70-66-71-75=282)	2 strokes	(Sweden) Liselotte Neumann
7	11 Mar 2001	AAMI Women's Australian Open^{2}	−11 (70-69-66=205)	4 strokes	(United States) Jane Crafter (Australia) Karrie Webb
8	5 Oct 2002	Biarritz Ladies Classic	−10 (69-67-64=200)	Playoff	(Scotland) Mhairi McKay
9	15 Jun 2003	Ladies Irish Open	−17 (66-63-73=202)	3 strokes	(England) Laura Davies
10	10 Aug 2003	HP Open	−19 (67-71-63-68=269)	Playoff	(Norway) Suzann Pettersen
11	17 Aug 2003	BT Ladies Open	−13 (66-69-68-72=275)	1 stroke	(England) Alison Nicholas
12	17 Sep 2006	Siemens Austrian Ladies Golf Open	−17 (71-64-65-71=271)	2 strokes	(England) Laura Davies
13	23 Sep 2007	De Vere Ladies Scottish Open	−3 (71-68-71=210)	5 strokes	(Sweden) Sofia Renell (am) (England) Kirsty Taylor (England) Danielle Masters
14	25 Apr 2010	European Ladies Golf Cup (with (Sweden) Anna Nordqvist)	−21 (267)	Playoff	(Australia) Karen Lunn and (Australia) Karrie Webb
15	8 Aug 2010	AIB Ladies Irish Open	−12 (70-68-66=204)	1 stroke	(Norway) Marianne Skarpnord (South Korea) In-Kyung Kim
16	17 Apr 2011	Communitat Valenciana European Ladies Golf Cup (with (Sweden) Anna Nordqvist)	−11 (267)	3 strokes	(Germany) Caroline Masson and (Germany) Anja Monke (England) Laura Davies and (England) Melissa Reid

Ladies European Tour playoff record (4–1)

No.	Year	Tournament	Opponent(s)	Result
1	1998	Donegal Irish Ladies' Open	(Denmark) Iben Tinning	Won with par on first extra hole
2	2002	Biarritz Ladies Classic	(Scotland) Mhairi McKay	Won with birdie on first extra hole
3	2003	HP Open	(Norway) Suzann Pettersen	Won with par on third extra hole
4	2009	Evian Masters^{1}	(Japan) Ai Miyazato	Lost to birdie on first extra hole
5	2010	European Nations Cup (with (Sweden) Anna Nordqvist)	(Australia) Karen Lunn and (Australia) Karrie Webb	Won with birdie on third extra hole

Note: Gustafson won the Weetabix Women's British Open once before it was recognized as a major championship on the LPGA Tour in 2001.

Notes:

- ^{1} Co-sanctioned by LPGA Tour and Ladies European Tour
- ^{2} Co-sanctioned by ALPG Tour and Ladies European Tour

=== Swedish Golf Tour wins (2) ===
- 1996 Rörstrand Ladies Open
- 1998 Telia Ladies Finale

=== Other wins (4) ===
- 1997 Thailand Ladies Open (Ladies Asian Tour)
- 1998 Lalla Meryem Cup (Morocco)
- 2000 TSN Ladies World Cup Golf (team event with Carin Koch)
- 2003 Catalonia World Matchplay Championship

== Results in LPGA majors ==
Results not in chronological order before 2014.

Tournament	1999	2000
Kraft Nabisco Championship	T79	
LPGA Championship	T54	T40
U.S. Women's Open	T20	T31
du Maurier Classic		T33

Tournament	2001	2002	2003	2004	2005	2006	2007	2008	2009
Kraft Nabisco Championship	T7	T25	T51	T48	T66	CUT	T43	T42	T64
LPGA Championship	CUT	CUT	CUT	T74	CUT	T44	T6	CUT	T16
U.S. Women's Open	11	CUT	CUT	CUT	T58	T10	CUT	CUT	CUT
Women's British Open ^	T42	T11	8	CUT	2	T2	T33	T24	T33

Tournament	2010	2011	2012	2013	2014
Kraft Nabisco Championship	T10	T15	CUT	T63	CUT
U.S. Women's Open	T19	CUT	56	CUT	
Women's British Open	T43	3	CUT	CUT	
LPGA Championship	T25	T57	T30	WD	CUT
The Evian Championship ^^				CUT	

^ The Women's British Open replaced the du Maurier Classic as an LPGA major in 2001
^^ The Evian Championship was added as a major in 2013

Top 10
Did not play

CUT = missed the half-way cut
"T" = tied

=== Summary ===
Tournament	Wins	2nd	3rd	Top-5	Top-10	Top-25	Events	Cuts made
Kraft Nabisco Championship	0	0	0	0	2	4	15	12
U.S. Women's Open	0	0	0	0	1	4	15	7
Women's British Open	0	2	1	3	4	6	13	10
LPGA Championship	0	0	0	0	1	3	16	9
du Maurier Classic	0	0	0	0	0	0	1	1
The Evian Championship	0	0	0	0	0	0	1	0
Totals	0	2	1	3	8	17	61	39

- Most consecutive cuts made – 7 (1999 Kraft Nabisco – 2001 Kraft Nabisco)
- Longest streak of top-10s – 2 (2006 U.S. Open – 2006 British Open)

== LPGA Tour career summary ==
Year	Tournaments played	Cuts made	Wins	2nd	3rd	Top 10s	Best finish	Earnings ($)	Money list rank	Scoring average	Scoring rank
1994	1	1	0	0	0	0	T75	612	n/a	77.25	n/a
1995	1	0	0	0	0	0	MC	n/a	n/a	82.00	n/a
1996	1	1	0	0	0	0	MC	n/a	n/a	75.00	n/a
1997	2	2	0	0	0	1	5	30,154	n/a	72.50	n/a
1998	4	2	0	1	0	1	T12	81,915	n/a	74.58	n/a
1999	21	11	0	0	0	1	T6	80,800	96	73.27	115
2000	21	18	2	1	0	4	1	544,390	13	71.93	17
2001	25	23	1	1	0	7	1	617,327	15	71.55	25
2002	20	15	0	0	0	0	T11	165,093	57	72.40	47
2003	22	17	1	1	0	6	1	635,372	18	71.11	17
2004	21	11	0	0	1	3	T3	167,843	65	73.48	124
2005	26	21	0	1	1	7	2	484,839	28	72.59	46
2006	25	21	0	1	1	6	T2	655,548	17	71.57	21
2007	19	16	0	1	0	6	T2	469,748	30	71.84	16
2008	23	17	0	2	1	5	T2	646,303	28	71.85	33
2009	22	17	1	1	0	7	1	792,359	17	71.54	26
2010	21	18	0	0	0	1	T10	231,715	45	72.70	59
2011	21	19	0	0	1	2	3	427,586	26	72.44	39
2012	22	16	0	0	0	0	T12	158,089	65	73.28	85
2013	15	2	0	0	0	0	T45	13,751	135	74.33	135
2014	3	0	0	0	0	0	MC	0	n/a	77.33	n/a

- official through 23 November 2014

== Team appearances ==
Professional

- Praia d'El Rey European Cup (representing Ladies European Tour): 1998 (tie), 1999 (winners)
- Solheim Cup (representing Europe): 1998, 2000 (winners), 2002, 2003 (winners), 2005, 2007, 2009, 2011 (winners)
- Lexus Cup (representing International team): 2005 (winners)
- World Cup (representing Sweden): 2005, 2008
- European Nations Cup (representing Sweden): 2010 (winners), 2011 (winners)

=== Solheim Cup record ===
Year	Total matches	Total W-L-H	Singles W-L-H	Foursomes W-L-H	Fourballs W-L-H	Points won	Points %
Career	31	13-12-6	3-4-1	7-1-4	3-7-1	16.0	51.6
1998	2	0-1-1	0-0-1 halved w/ M. Mallon		0-1-0 lost w/ L.Hackney 7&5	0.5	25.0
2000	4	2-1-1	0-1-0 lost to B. Burton 4&3	1-0-1 won w/ T. Johnson 3&2, halved w/ T. Johnson	1-0-0 won w/ T. Johnson 3&2	2.5	62.5
2002	3	2-1-0	1-0-0 def. C. Kerr 3&2		1-1-0 lost w/ K. Icher 4&3, won w/ L. Davies 1 up	2.0	66.7
2003	5	3-2-0	1-0-0 def. H. Bowie 5&4	2-0-0 won w/ E. Esterl 3&2, won w/ S. Pettersen 3&1	0-2-0 lost w/ I. Tinning 2 dn, lost w/ L. Davies 2&1	3.0	60.0
2005	5	1-2-2	0-1-0 lost to J.Inkster 2&1	1-0-1 halved w/ T. Johnson, won w/ C. Koch 5&3	0-1-1 lost w/ K Stupples 2&1, halved w/ S. Pettersen	2.0	40.0
2007	4	0-2-2	0-1-0 lost to P.Hurst 2&1	0-0-2 halved w/ S. Pettersen, halved w/ S. Pettersen	0-1-0 lost w/ G. Nocera 3&2	1.0	25.0
2009	4	1-3-0	0-1-0 lost to B. Lincicome 3&2	1-1-0 lost w/ S. Pettersen 4&2, won w/ J. Moodie 4&3	0-1-0 lost w/ S. Pettersen 1 dn	1.0	25.0
2011	4	4-0-0	1-0-0 def. S. Lewis 2 up	2-0-0 won w/ S. Pettersen 1 up, won w/ C. Hedwall 6&5	1-0-0 won w/ C. Hedwall 5&4	4.0	100.

== See also ==
- List of golfers with most Ladies European Tour wins
