= Women's Irish Open =

Professional golf tournament

Tournament information
- Location: Ireland
- Established: 1994
- Tour: Ladies European Tour
- Format: 54 or 72-hole Stroke play
- Prize fund: €450,000

Tournament record score
- Aggregate: 267 Laura Davies
- To par: −25 As above

Current champion
- (South Africa) Casandra Alexander

The Women's Irish Open is a professional golf tournament on the Ladies European Tour (LET), held in Ireland.

The tournament became part of the LET schedule in 1994 and ran for ten editions through 2003. After a four-year hiatus, the tournament was revived again in 2008 as part of the buildup to the 2011 Solheim Cup, scheduled for late September at Killeen Castle in County Meath. Killeen Castle hosted the Ladies Irish Open in early August, the week following the Women's British Open. Last played in 2012, the tournament returned in 2022, now held at Dromoland Castle in County Clare.

At St. Margaret's in 1995, Laura Davies recorded a 72-hole total of 267 (−25), 16 strokes clear of runner-up Åsa Gottmo, setting world records for the lowest aggregate score and the biggest margin of victory in women's professional golf.

Multiple winners are Sophie Gustafson (1998, 2000, 2003, 2010), Suzann Pettersen (2008, 2011) and Laura Davies (1994, 1995).

== Winners ==
Year	Venue	County	Winner	Score	To Par	Margin of victory	Runner(s)-up	Winner's share (€)
KPMG Women's Irish Open
2026	The K Club	Kildare	(South Africa) Casandra Alexander	63-66-69-70=268	−20	3 strokes	(Czech Republic) Sára Kousková	67,500
2025	Carton House	Kildare	(England) Lottie Woad (a)	68-67-67-69=271	−21	6 strokes	(Sweden) Madelene Sagström	67,500
2024	Carton House	Kildare	(England) Annabel Dimmock	72-66-65-70=273	−19	Playoff	(France) Pauline Roussin-Bouchard	60,000
2023	Dromoland Castle	Clare	(Denmark) Smilla Tarning Sønderby	71-67-72-62=272	−16	Playoff	(Sweden) Lisa Pettersson (Netherlands) Anne Van Dam	60,000
2022	Dromoland Castle	Clare	(Czech Republic) Klára Spilková	66-68-73-67=274	−14	Playoff	(Denmark) Nicole Broch Estrup (Finland) Ursula Wikström	60,000
2013–2021: No tournament
Ladies Irish Open
2012	Killeen Castle	Meath	(Scotland) Catriona Matthew	67-71-71=209	−7	1 stroke	(Norway) Suzann Pettersen	52,500
2011	Killeen Castle	Meath	(Norway) Suzann Pettersen (2)	71-63-64=198	−18	6 strokes	(Spain) Azahara Muñoz	60,000
AIB Ladies' Irish Open
2010	Killeen Castle	Meath	(Sweden) Sophie Gustafson (4)	70-68-66=204	−12	1 stroke	(Norway) Marianne Skarpnord (South Korea) In-Kyung Kim	75,000
2009	Portmarnock Links	Fingal	(Italy) Diana Luna	68-69-68=205	−11	4 strokes	(France) Gwladys Nocera (England) Florentyna Parker (Sweden) Sophie Gustafson	75,000
2008	Portmarnock Links	Fingal	(Norway) Suzann Pettersen	69-69-67=205	−11	5 strokes	(Norway) Marianne Skarpnord	67,500
Ladies' Irish Open
2004–2007: No tournament
2003	Killarney	Kerry	(Sweden) Sophie Gustafson (3)	66-63-73=202	−17	3 strokes	(England) Laura Davies	24,750
2002	Killarney	Kerry	(Denmark) Iben Tinning	71-70-73=214	−2	Playoff	(Norway) Suzann Pettersen	24,750
Waterford Crystal Ladies' Irish Open
2001	Faithlegg	Waterford	(Spain) Raquel Carriedo	68-66-66=200	−16	1 stroke	(Sweden) Sophie Gustafson	24,486
2000	Faithlegg	Waterford	(Sweden) Sophie Gustafson (2)	71-71-71-69=282	−6	1 stroke	(France) Marine Monnet	24,202
Donegal Irish Ladies' Open
1999	Letterkenny	Donegal	(France) Sandrine Mendiburu	71-72-71-72=286	+2	Playoff	(Spain) Raquel Carriedo (England) Laura Davies (Germany) Elisabeth Esterl	22,395
1998	Ballyliffin	Donegal	(Sweden) Sophie Gustafson	68-78-68=214	−2	Playoff	(Denmark) Iben Tinning	19,260
Guardian Irish Open
1997	Luttrellstown Castle	Dublin	(France) Patricia Meunier-Lebouc	74-70-69-71=284	−4	1 stroke	(Spain) Laura Navarro	24,635
1996	Citywest	Dublin	(England) Alison Nicholas	69-73-65-70=277	−11	8 strokes	(England) Trish Johnson	16,500
Guardian Irish Holidays Open
1995	St Margaret's	Dublin	(England) Laura Davies (2)	67-66-66-68=267	−25	16 strokes	(Sweden) Åsa Gottmo	15,000
Holiday Ireland Women's Open
1994	St Margaret's	Dublin	(England) Laura Davies	282	−6	8 strokes	(Sweden) Carin Hjalmarsson (Wales) Helen Wadsworth	10,500

== See also ==
- Northern Ireland Ladies Open
- Irish Open
