= Samantha Head =

English golfer

Personal information
- Nationality: England
- Born: 28 February 1973 (age 53) Ascot, Berkshire, England
- Height: 1.70 m (5 ft 7 in)

Career
- Sport: Golf
- Turned professional: 1995
- Former tours: Ladies European Tour (1995-2009); Symetra Tour (2006)
- Professional wins: 2

Number of wins by tour
- Ladies European Tour: 2

Best results in LPGA major championships
- Chevron Championship: DNP
- Women's PGA C'ship: DNP
- U.S. Women's Open: DNP
- du Maurier Classic: DNP
- Women's British Open: T51: 2009

Samantha Head (born 28 February 1973) is an English professional golfer with two Ladies European Tour (LET) wins.

Head was born in Ascot, Berkshire and her twin sister Johanna is also a professional golfer. She joined the Ladies European Tour in 1995 and won two individual tournaments on it, the Ladies Italian Open and South African Ladies Masters. Head was also runner-up at the Chrysler Open, Ladies Central European Open and SAS Masters and finished top-10 on the 2000 Ladies European Tour Order of Merit.

Head featured in the ninth season of The Big Break in 2008. Her first daughter Amy was born in April 2010 and she retired from tour.

== Professional wins (2) ==
=== Ladies European Tour wins (2) ===
No.	Date	Tournament	Winning score	To par	Margin of victory	Runner-up
1	25 Sep 1999	Ladies Italian Open	71-72-71=214	−5	1 stroke	(Spain) Marina Arruti (Netherlands) Mette Hageman (Finland) Riikka Hakkarainen (England) Trish Johnson (France) Patricia Meunier-Lebouc
2	25 Mar 2001	Nedbank Mastercard South African Masters	70-72-68=210	−6	1 stroke	(Spain) Raquel Carriedo (Germany) Elisabeth Esterl (Norway) Cecilie Lundgreen
