= Iben Tinning =

Danish professional golfer (born 1974)

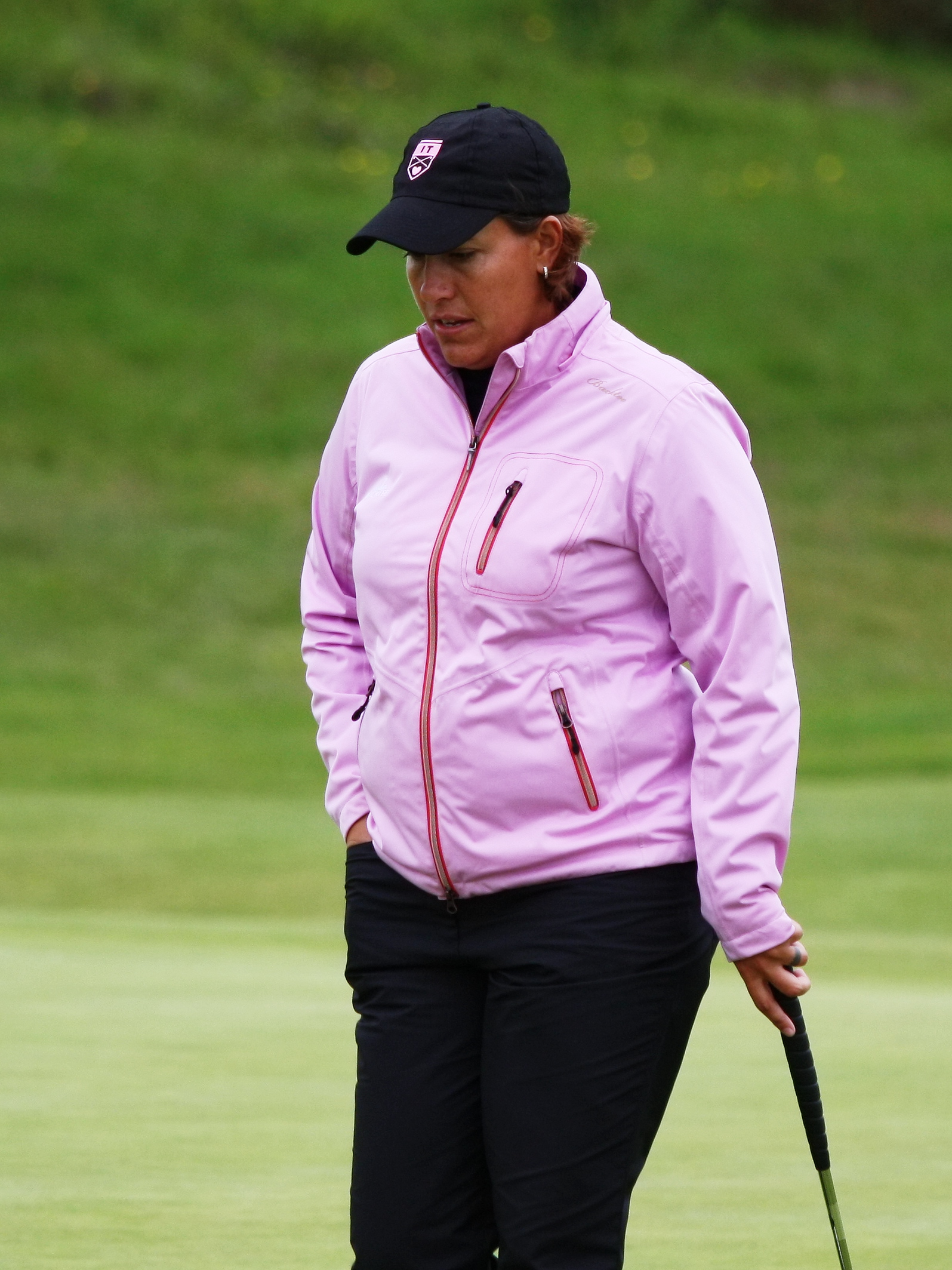
- Tinning at the 2010 Women's British Open

Personal information
- Nationality: Denmark
- Born: 4 February 1974 (age 52) Copenhagen, Denmark
- Height: 1.72 m (5 ft 8 in)

Career
- Sport: Golf
- Turned professional: 1994
- Former tours: Ladies European Tour (joined 1996); LPGA Tour (joined 2004)
- Professional wins: 6

Number of wins by tour
- Ladies European Tour: 6

Best results in LPGA major championships
- Chevron Championship: T35: 2004
- Women's PGA C'ship: CUT: 2004
- U.S. Women's Open: CUT: 2006
- du Maurier Classic: DNP
- Women's British Open: T3: 2001

Achievements and awards
- Ladies European Tour Order of Merit: 2005
- Ladies European Tour Player of the Year: 2005

Iben Tinning (born 4 February 1974 in Copenhagen) is a Danish professional golfer.

== Career ==
Her first two wins on the Ladies European Tour (LET) came in 2002. In 2003, she won the LPGA Tour's Qualifying Tournament, but her 2004 LPGA rookie season was disappointing and she lost her card. Back in Europe, in 2005 she finished top of the Order of Merit, becoming the first Danish golfer to top the money list on any major international tour. As of the end of the 2005 season she had won five tournaments on the LET. She was a member of the European Solheim Cup team in 2002, 2003 and 2005.

In 2007, Tinning played in the Solheim Cup losing her singles match to Juli Inkster.

Tinning also led the Dubai Ladies Masters after 70 holes, before Annika Sörenstam sunk a 17-foot birdie putt on 17 to tie Tinning who missed an 8-footer for birdie. On the par-5 18th, Tinning hit her approach onto the green, only to have it spin back into the water, allowing Sörenstam the tournament victory.

In 2010, Tinning announced that she would be retiring at the end of the season due to a lingering hip injury. She played her last tournament at the season-ending Omega Dubai Ladies Masters on the Ladies Europe Tour and won the tournament.

== Professional wins (6) ==
=== Ladies European Tour wins (6) ===
- 2002 (2) Ladies Irish Open, La Perla Ladies Italian Open
- 2005 (3) Open de Espana Femenino, BMW Ladies Italian Open, Nykredit Masters
- 2010 (1) Omega Dubai Ladies Masters

== Team appearances ==
Amateur

- European Ladies' Team Championship (representing Denmark): 1993, 1995
- Espirito Santo Trophy (representing Denmark): 1994

Professional

- Solheim Cup (representing Europe): 2002, 2003 (winners), 2005, 2007
- World Cup (representing Denmark): 2007
