= Valérie Van Ryckeghem =

Belgian golfer

Personal information
- Nationality: Belgium
- Born: 21 August 1975 (age 51)

Career
- Sport: Golf
- Turned professional: 1995
- Former tour: Ladies European Tour (1996–2002)
- Professional wins: 3

Number of wins by tour
- Ladies European Tour: 1
- Other: 2

Valérie Van Ryckeghem (born 21 August 1975) is a professional golfer from Belgium.

== Career ==
Van Ryckeghem turned professional on November 1, 1995. She played on the Ladies European Tour 1996–2002, where she earned her first win in 1997. She finished in the top-10 11 times, but a second victory proved elusive. She ranked 8th on the LET Order of Merit in 2000.

After retiring from the LET, Van Ryckeghem became one of the pros of the Royal Zoute Golf Club.

== Professional wins (3) ==
=== Ladies European Tour wins (1) ===
- 1997 Sicilian Ladies' Open/Italian Ladies' Open

=== Other wins (2) ===
- 2001 PGA Kampioenschap (Belgium)
- 2002 PGA Kampioenschap (Belgium)

== Team appearances ==
Amateur

- Espirito Santo Trophy (representing Belgium): 1994
- European Ladies' Team Championship (representing Belgium): 1995
