= The Evian Championship =

Annual women's golf tournament in France

Coordinates: 46.394°N 6.570°E

Tournament information
- Location: Évian-les-Bains, Haute-Savoie, France
- Established: 1994; 32 years ago
- Course: Evian Resort Golf Club
- Par: 71
- Length: 6,479 yards (5,924 m)
- Tours: Ladies European Tour; LPGA Tour
- Format: Stroke play - 72 holes
- Prize fund: US$9.1 million
- Month played: July (2019-present); September (2013–2018); July (2003–2012); June (1994–2002)

Tournament record score
- Aggregate: 263 Chun In-gee (2016)
- To par: −21 Juli Inkster (2003) −21 Chun In-gee (2016)

Current champion
- (South Korea) Ryu Hae-ran

Final champion
- 2026 Evian Championship

Location in France

The Evian Championship, currently known for sponsorship reasons as The Amundi Evian Championship, is a women's professional golf tournament in France, played at the Evian Resort Golf Club in Évian-les-Bains. It was originally held in June, moved to July in 2003, and moved again to September in 2013. It returned to a July date in 2019.

Founded 32 years ago in 1994 on the Ladies European Tour (LET) as the Evian Masters, it is one of two major championships on the LET. Not originally a major on the LPGA Tour, it became an LPGA co-sanctioned event in 2000, which included a significant increase in purse size. The purse was increased from $4.1 million to $4.5 million effective with the 2021 event. The 2022 event saw an increase in the purse to $6.5 million, with the winner earning $1 million.

Originally a mid-June event, it was played in late July from 2003 to 2012, then moved to mid-September in 2013 when it became the final major for both tours. The average elevation of the course is approximately 480 metres (1,575 ft) above sea level and overlooks nearby Lake Geneva to the north.

In July 2011 it was announced that beginning in 2013, the Evian Masters would be renamed "The Evian Championship" and would become the fifth major on the LPGA Tour schedule and move to September.

After the 2017 Evian Championship was reduced to 54 holes, LPGA commissioner Mike Whan admitted it was a mistake to move the major to a September date and vowed to move it back to summer by 2019. Furthermore, major changes in 2019 for the majors in men's golf, which will now be held in consecutive months – April, May, June, July – means the Evian can be held in August and be the final major in professional golf, men's or women's. Ultimately, the new date for the Evian was set as the last full weekend in July, the week after The Open Championship (men's).

In February 2021, the tournament organizers and French asset management firm Amundi jointly announced that the firm had become the tournament's title sponsor effective with the 2021 event to run for five years.

== Course ==
Evian Resort Golf Club – (1994–present)

(a.k.a. Domaine du Royal Club Evian)

== Field ==
Prior to 2007, the event included 78 players, about half the size of a full-field LPGA Tour event, and was held over four days without a cut, meaning all players played all four days regardless of their scores. Beginning in 2007, the field was expanded to 90 players and a cut added after the second round. A cut means the players with the lowest 70 scores and anyone tied for 70th place play all four rounds and win prize money based on their final standing in the tournament. The other players are eliminated after the second round. The field was increased to 111 players in 2010 and 120 when it became a major in 2013.

== Scoring record ==
The tournament scoring record of 263 (−21) was set by Chun In-gee in 2016. The lowest round record is 60 held by Ryu Hae-ran.

== Winners ==
LET and LPGA co-sanctioned major (2013–present)

Year	Dates	Champion	Score	To par	Margin of victory	Runner(s)-up	Purse (US$)	Winner's share
2026	9–12 Jul	(South Korea) Ryu Hae-ran	66-68-60-71=265	−19	Playoff	(Canada) Brooke Henderson	9,100,000	1,400,000
2025	10–13 Jul	(Australia) Grace Kim	65-68-70-67=270	−14	Playoff	(Thailand) Jeeno Thitikul	8,000,000	1,200,000
2024	11–14 Jul	(Japan) Ayaka Furue	65-65-70-65=265	−19	1 stroke	(Australia) Stephanie Kyriacou	8,000,000	1,200,000
2023	26–29 Jul	(France) Céline Boutier	66-69-67-68=270	−14	6 strokes	(Canada) Brooke Henderson	6,500,000	1,000,000
2022	21–24 Jul	(Canada) Brooke Henderson	64-64-68-71=267	−17	1 stroke	(United States) Sophia Schubert	6,500,000	1,000,000
2021	22–25 Jul	(Australia) Minjee Lee	68-69-65-64=266	−18	Playoff	(South Korea) Lee Jeong-eun	4,500,000	675,000
2020	Cancelled due to the COVID-19 pandemic.							
2019	25–28 Jul	(South Korea) Ko Jin-young	65-71-66-67=269	−15	2 strokes	(China) Shanshan Feng (South Korea) Kim Hyo-joo (United States) Jennifer Kupcho	4,100,000	615,000
2018	13–16 Sep	(United States) Angela Stanford	72-64-68-68=272	−12	1 stroke	(United States) Austin Ernst (South Korea) Kim Sei-young (United States) Mo Martin (United States) Amy Olson	3,850,000	577,500
2017*	14–17 Sep	(Sweden) Anna Nordqvist	70-68-66=204	−9	Playoff	(United States) Brittany Altomare	3,650,000	547,500
2016	15–18 Sep	(South Korea) Chun In-gee	63-66-65-69=263	−21	4 strokes	(South Korea) Park Sung-hyun (South Korea) Ryu So-yeon	3,250,000	487,500
2015	10–13 Sep	(New Zealand) Lydia Ko	69-69-67-63=268	−16	6 strokes	(United States) Lexi Thompson	3,250,000	487,500
2014	11–14 Sep	(South Korea) Kim Hyo-joo	61-72-72-68=273	−11	1 stroke	(Australia) Karrie Webb	3,250,000	487,500
2013*	12–15 Sep	(Norway) Suzann Pettersen	66-69-68=203	−10	2 strokes	(New Zealand) Lydia Ko (a)	3,250,000	487,500

* Reduced to 54 holes due to rain

LET and LPGA co-sanctioned event (2000–2012)

Year	Dates	Champion	Score	To par	Margin of victory	Runner(s)-up	Purse (US$)	Winner's share
Evian Masters
2012	26–29 Jul	(South Korea) Inbee Park	71-64-70-66=271	−17	2 strokes	(United States) Stacy Lewis (Australia) Karrie Webb	3,250,000	487,500
2011	21–24 Jul	(Japan) Ai Miyazato	68-68-67-70=273	−15	2 strokes	(United States) Stacy Lewis	3,250,000	487,500
2010	22–25 Jul	(South Korea) Jiyai Shin	68-70-71-66=274	−14	1 stroke	(South Korea) Choi Na-yeon (United States) Morgan Pressel (United States) Lexi Thompson	3,250,000	487,500
2009	23–26 Jul	(Japan) Ai Miyazato	69-66-70-69=274	−14	Playoff	(Sweden) Sophie Gustafson	3,250,000	487,500
2008	24–27 Jul	(Sweden) Helen Alfredsson	72-63-71-67=273	−15	Playoff	(South Korea) Choi Na-yeon (Brazil) Angela Park	3,250,000	487,500
2007	26–29 Jul	(United States) Natalie Gulbis	72-69-73-70=284	−4	Playoff	(South Korea) Jang Jeong	3,000,000	450,000
2006	26–29 Jul	(Australia) Karrie Webb	67-68-69-68=272	−16	1 stroke	(England) Laura Davies (United States) Michelle Wie	3,000,000	450,000
2005	20–23 Jul	(United States) Paula Creamer	68-68-66-71=273	−15	8 strokes	(Mexico) Lorena Ochoa (United States) Michelle Wie	2,500,000	375,000
2004	21–24 Jul	(Australia) Wendy Doolan	68-68-69-65=270	−18	1 stroke	(Sweden) Annika Sörenstam	2,500,000	375,000
2003	23–26 Jul	(United States) Juli Inkster	66-72-64-65=267	−21	6 strokes	(South Korea) Han Hee-won	2,100,000	315,000
2002	12–15 Jun	(Sweden) Annika Sörenstam	68-67-65-69=269	−19	4 strokes	(Sweden) Maria Hjorth (South Korea) Mi-Hyun Kim	2,100,000	315,000
2001	13–16 Jun	(Australia) Rachel Teske	71-68-66-68=273	−15	1 stroke	(Sweden) Maria Hjorth	2,100,000	315,000
2000	14–17 Jun	(Sweden) Annika Sörenstam	70-68-70-68=276	−12	Playoff	(Australia) Karrie Webb	1,800,000	270,000

LET event (1994–1999)

Year	Dates	Champion	Score	To par	Margin of victory	Runner(s)-up	Purse (£)	Winner's share
Evian Masters
1999	9–12 Jun	(Sweden) Catrin Nilsmark	69-70-72-68=279	−9	2 strokes	(England) Laura Davies	689,000	102,500
1998	3–6 Jun	(Sweden) Helen Alfredsson	70-69-73-65=277	−11	4 strokes	(Sweden) Maria Hjorth	500,000	75,000
1997	18–21 Jun	(Japan) Hiromi Kobayashi	69-67-69-69=274	−14	Playoff	(England) Alison Nicholas	425,000	63,750
1996	19–22 Jun	(England) Laura Davies	72-69-65-68=274	−14	4 strokes	(Sweden) Carin Koch	375,000	56,250
1995	7–10 Jun	(England) Laura Davies	68-67-69-67=271	−17	5 strokes	(Sweden) Annika Sörenstam	270,000	40,630
1994	9–12 Jun	(Sweden) Helen Alfredsson	71-73-73-70=287	−1	3 strokes	(England) Lora Fairclough (Australia) Sarah Gautrey	232,500	34,875

In 2017 Nordqvist won with a bogey 5 on the first extra hole. In 2009 Miyazato won with a birdie 4 on the first extra hole. In 2008 Alfredsson won with a birdie 4 on the third extra hole, Park having been eliminated when the other two players made birdies on the first extra hole. In 2007 Gulbis beat Jang with a birdie 4 on the first extra hole. In 2000 Sörenstam beat Webb with an eagle 3 on the first extra hole. In 1997 Kobayashi beat Nicholas with an eagle 3 on the first extra hole.

== Multiple winners ==
- Helen Alfredsson (1994, 1998, 2008)
- Laura Davies (1995, 1996)
- Annika Sörenstam (2000, 2002)
- Ai Miyazato (2009, 2011)
