= Evian Resort Golf Club =

Golf course in southeastern France

Coordinates: 46°23′36″N 6°34′08″E

Location in France

Evian Resort Golf Club is a golf course in southeastern France, located in Évian-les-Bains, Haute-Savoie. Overlooking Lake Geneva, it hosts The Evian Championship, formerly known as the "Evian Masters," annually in July. From 2013 to 2018, The Evian Championship was the LPGA Tour's fifth and final major championship. It is currently the fourth major of the year.

The standard 18-hole course is par 71 at 6,693 yards (6,120 m). The entire course, with a particular focus on the tees, fairways, greens, and bunkers, underwent a $8 million renovation in 2012–13, designed by architect Steve Smyers and European Golf Design. The course has received criticism for fundamental design flaws, presenting players with "too many bad breaks with good shots" according to Lexi Thompson, and causing Stacy Lewis to boycott the course for two years. The average elevation of the course is approximately 480 metres (1,575 ft) above sea level.
