= 1989 Ladies European Tour =

Golf tournament series

1989 Ladies European Tour season
- Duration: April 1989 – November 1989
- Number of official events: 21
- Order of Merit: (France) Marie-Laure Taya

The 1989 Ladies European Tour was a series of golf tournaments for elite female golfers from around the world which took place in 1989. The tournaments were sanctioned by the Ladies European Tour (LET).

== Tournaments ==
The table below shows the 1989 schedule. The numbers in brackets after the winners' names show the number of career wins they had on the Ladies European Tour up to and including that event. This is only shown for members of the tour.

Dates	Tournament	Location	Winner	Score	Margin of victory	Runner(s)-up	Winner's share (£)	Note
16 Apr	Rome Classic	Italy	(Sweden) Sofia Grönberg (1)	210 (−6)	1 strokes	(France) Marie-Laure Taya	9,750	
30 Apr	Ford Ladies' Classic	England	(France) Marie-Laure Taya (10)	286 (−10)	8 strokes	(Scotland) Gillian Stewart	7,500	
28 May	Hennessy Ladies Cup	France	(France) Marie-Laure Taya (11)	279 (−9)	2 strokes	(Australia) Corinne Dibnah (United States) Jody Rosenthal	12,000	
11 Jun	BMW Ladies Classic	Germany	(France) Marie-Laure Taya (12)	277 (−11)	1 stroke	(Australia) Dennise Hutton	10,500	New tournament
18 Jun	Open de France Dames	France	(England) Suzanne Strudwick (1)	285 (−3)	Playoff	(France) Marie-Laure Taya	9,000	
2 Jul	St Moritz Classic	Switzerland	(England) Kitrina Douglas (5)	286 (−2)	Playoff	(England) Suzanne Strudwick	10,500	
9 Jul	TEC Players Championship	England	(Sweden) Anna Oxenstierna (1)	286 (−6)	2 strokes	(South Africa) Laurette Maritz	11,250	
16 Jul	Bloor Homes Eastleigh Classic	England	(England) Debbie Dowling (6)	261 (−3)	Playoff	(South Africa) Rae Hast (United States) Melissa McNamara (Scotland) Cathy Panton	9,000	
30 Jul	Lufthansa Ladies' German Open	Germany	(England) Alison Nicholas (6)	269 (−19)	5 strokes	(Colombia) Patricia Gonzales	12,000	
6 Aug	**Weetabix Women's British Open**	England	(United States) Jane Geddes (1)	274 (−14)	2 strokes	(Belgium) Florence Descampe	18,000	
20 Aug	Danish Ladies Open	Denmark	(Spain) Tania Abitbol (1)	285 (−3)	Playoff	(France) Marie-Laure Taya	9,750	
27 Aug	Gisvaled Ladies Open	Sweden	(England) Alison Nicholas (7)	288 (E)	2 strokes	(Sweden) Liselotte Neumann	9,750	
3 Sep	Variety Club Celebrity Classic	England	(Australia) Corinne Dibnah (7)	279 (−9)	1 strokes	(United States) Peggy Conley	6,500	
10 Sep	Godiva Ladies European Masters	Belgium	(England) Kitrina Douglas (6)	287 (−5)	Playoff	(France) Marie-Laure Taya	16,500	
17 Sep	Ladies European Open	England	(Scotland) Jane Connachan (5)	279 (−13)	3 strokes	(Scotland) Gillian Stewart	10,500	
2 Oct	Ladies Italian Open	Italy	(Spain) Xonia Wunsch-Ruiz (1)	278 (−10)	2 strokes	(Scotland) Jane Connachan	12,000	
15 Oct	Laing Ladies Charity Classic	England	(England) Laura Davies (10)	276 (−16)	3 strokes	(Scotland) Jane Connachan (Australia) Corinne Dibnah (United States) Susan Moon (Scotland) Dale Reid	9,000	
22 Oct	Woolmark Ladies Match Play Championship	Spain	(Australia) Dennise Hutton (1)	2 up		(Northern Ireland) Maureen Garner	12,000	Match play event
29 Oct	AGF Biarritz Ladies Open	France	(Australia) Dennise Hutton (2)	274 (−2)	Playoff	(United States) Peggy Conley	9,000	
3 Nov	Qualitair Classic	Spain	(England) Alison Nicholas (8)	213 (−3)	2 strokes	(United States) Peggy Conley (Sweden) Sofia Grönberg	7,500	
12 Nov	Benson & Hedges Trophy	Spain	(Spain) Miguel Ángel Jiménez & (Spain) Xonia Wunsch-Ruiz	281 (−7)	2 strokes	(England) Carl Mason & (Scotland) Gillian Stewart	11,700 each	Mixed-team event (unofficial)

Major championships in bold.

== Order of Merit rankings ==
Rank	Player	Prize money (£)
1	(France) Marie-Laure Taya	77,534
2	(England) Alison Nicholas	56,527
3	(England) Kitrina Douglas	48,534
4	(England) Suzanne Strudwick	41,966
5	(Australia) Dennise Hutton	41,541
6	(Scotland) Jane Connachan	38,227
7	(United States) Peggy Conley	36,876
8	(Australia) Corinne Dibnah	35,622
9	(South Africa) Laurette Maritz	33,978
10	(Scotland) Gillian Stewart	31,700

== See also ==
- 1989 LPGA Tour
