= 1990 Ladies European Tour =

Series of golf tournaments

1990 Ladies European Tour season
- Duration: April 1990 – November 1991
- Number of official events: 21
- Order of Merit: (England) Trish Johnson

The 1990 Ladies European Tour was a series of golf tournaments for elite female golfers from around the world which took place in 1990. The tournaments were sanctioned by the Ladies European Tour (LET).

== Tournaments ==
The table below shows the 1990 schedule. The numbers in brackets after the winners' names show the number of career wins they had on the Ladies European Tour up to and including that event. This is only shown for members of the tour.

Dates	Tournament	Location	Winner	Margin of victory	Runner(s)-up	Note	Winner's share (£)
22 Apr	Valextra Classic	Italy	(Belgium) Florence Descampe (2)	6 strokes	(Scotland) Dale Reid		10,500
29 Apr	Ford Ladies Classic	England	(France) Marie-Laure de Lorenzi (13)	3 strokes	(South Africa) Laurette Maritz		9,750
7 May	Longines Classic	France	(England) Trish Johnson (4)	1 stroke	(Scotland) Gillian Stewart		15,000
13 May	Hennessy Ladies Cup	France	(England) Trish Johnson (5)	3 strokes	(France) Marie-Laure de Lorenzi, (United States) Tammie Green		13,500
26 May	WPG European Tour Classic	England	(Spain) Tania Abitbol (2)	2 strokes	(Sweden) Anna Oxenstierna		9,000
9 Jun	Bonmont Ladies Swiss Classic	Switzerland	(Switzerland) Evelyn Orley (1)	Playoff	(Scotland) Gillian Stewart		10,500
24 Jun	BMW European Masters	Belgium	(Australia) Karen Lunn (3)	4 strokes	(France) Corinne Soulès		18,000
1 Jul	BMW Ladies Classic	Germany	(England) Diane Barnard (1)	1 stroke	(Australia) Corinne Dibnah		10,500
8 Jul	Laing Ladies Charity Classic	England	(South Africa) Laurette Maritz (3)	Playoff	(England) Alison Nicholas		9,750
15 Jul	Bloor Homes Eastleigh Classic	England	(England) Trish Johnson (6)	5 strokes	(Australia) Corinne Dibnah		9,765
5 Aug	**Weetabix Women's British Open**	England	(Sweden) Helen Alfredsson (1)	Playoff	(Zimbabwe) Jane Hill		20,000
12 Aug	Lufthansa Ladies German Open	Germany	(Japan) Ayako Okamoto (2)	Playoff	(South Africa) Laurette Maritz, (United States) Cindy Rarick		13,500
26 Aug	Haninge Ladies Open	Sweden	(Scotland) Dale Reid (19)	1 stroke	(Northern Ireland) Maureen Garner, (England) Alison Nicholas, (England) Suzanne Strudwick		10,500
2 Sep	Variety Club Celebrity Classic	England	(England) Alison Nicholas (9)	1 stroke	(Sweden) Sofia Grönberg		7,800
9 Sep	TEC Players Championship	England	(Australia) Anne Jones (1)	1 stroke	(South Africa) Laurette Maritz		12,000
16 Sep	Ladies European Open	England	(England) Trish Johnson (7)	2 strokes	(United States) Michelle Estill, (United States) Pearl Sinn		11,250
23 Sep	Trophée Internationale Coconut Skol	France	(Australia) Corinne Dibnah (8)	1 stroke	(Sweden) Helen Alfredsson		10,500
7 Oct	Italian Ladies' Open	Italy	(Belgium) Florence Descampe (3)	3 strokes	(Sweden) Helen Alfredsson		13,500
21 Oct	Woolmark Ladies' Matchplay	Spain	(Belgium) Florence Descampe (4)	2 and 1	(Scotland) Dale Reid	Match play event	12,000
28 Oct	AGF Biarritz Ladies Open	France	(England) Laura Davies (11)	1 stroke	(England) Alison Nicholas		12,000
4 Nov	Benson & Hedges Trophy	Spain	(Spain) Tania Abitbol & (Spain) José María Cañizares	2 strokes	(England) Alison Nicholas & (Wales) Mark Mouland	Mixed-team event (unofficial)	US$29,750 each

Major championships in bold.

== Order of Merit rankings ==
Rank	Player	Prize money (£)
1	(England) Trish Johnson	83,043
2	(England) Alison Nicholas	63,199
3	(Sweden) Helen Alfredsson	63,079
4	(South Africa) Laurette Maritz-Atkins	56,273
5	(Belgium) Florence Descampe	51,518
6	(Scotland) Dale Reid	49,343
7	(Scotland) Gillian Stewart	43,531
8	(France) Marie-Laure de Lorenzi	40,351
9	(Australia) Corinne Dibnah	39,665
10	(England) Diane Barnard	39,658

== See also ==
- 1990 LPGA Tour
