= 1991 Ladies European Tour =

Golf tournament series

1991 Ladies European Tour season
- Duration: April 1991 – November 1991
- Number of official events: 16
- Order of Merit: (Australia) Corinne Dibnah

The 1991 Ladies European Tour was a series of golf tournaments for elite female golfers from around the world which took place in 1991. The tournaments were sanctioned by the Ladies European Tour (LET).

== Tournaments ==
The table below shows the 1991 schedule. The numbers in brackets after the winners' names show the number of career wins they had on the Ladies European Tour up to and including that event. This is only shown for members of the tour.

Dates	Tournament	Location	Winner	Margin of victory	Runner(s)-up	Note	Winner's share (£)
21 Apr	Valextra Classic	Italy	(England) Laura Davies (12)	4 strokes	(Spain) Tania Abitbol		12,000
28 Apr	AGF Ladies' Open	France	(England) Suzanne Strudwick (2)	3 strokes	(England) Laura Davies, (Scotland) Catherine Panton-Lewis		14,957
5 May	Ford Ladies Classic	England	(Scotland) Dale Reid (20)	1 stroke	(England) Alison Nicholas		9,750
26 May	BMW European Masters	Belgium	(Australia) Corinne Dibnah (9)	3 strokes	(Belgium) Florence Descampe, (Sweden) Catrin Nilsmark		19,500
9 Jun	Spanish Classic	Spain	(Australia) Corinne Dibnah (10)	Playoff	(South Africa) Laurette Maritz		10,500
16 Jun	Hennessy Ladies Cup	Germany	(Sweden) Helen Alfredsson (2)	Playoff	(France) Marie-Laure de Lorenzi, (Australia) Corinne Dibnah		15,000
23 Jun	Trophée Coconut Skol	France	(Sweden) Helen Alfredsson (3)	3 strokes	(Scotland) Dale Reid		15,000
14 Jul	Bloor Homes Eastleigh Classic	England	(Scotland) Dale Reid (21)	8 strokes	(England) Diane Barnard		10,500
28 Jul	Lufthansa Ladies German Open	Germany	(Belgium) Florence Descampe (5)	3 strokes	(Sweden) Liselotte Neumann		15,000
4 Aug	**Weetabix Women's British Open**	England	(England) Penny Grice-Whittaker (2)	3 strokes	(Sweden) Helen Alfredsson, (England) Diane Barnard		25,000
18 Aug	IBM Ladies Open	Sweden	(Sweden) Liselotte Neumann (6)	3 strokes	(France) Marie-Laure de Lorenzi		12,000
22 Sep	BMW Italian Ladies' Open	Italy	(Australia) Corinne Dibnah (11)	3 strokes	(Belgium) Florence Descampe		15,000
29 Sep	Ladies English Open	England	(England) Kitrina Douglas (7)	Playoff	(Switzerland) Evelyn Orley		11,250
20 Oct	Woolmark Ladies' Matchplay	Italy	(Italy) Federica Dassù (3)	5 and 4	(Scotland) Dale Reid	Match play event	12,000
27 Oct	Longines Classic	France	(England) Penny Grice-Whittaker (3)	1 stroke	(England) Laura Davies, (Australia) Corinne Dibnah		16,500
10 Nov	Benson & Hedges Trophy	Spain	(Sweden) Helen Alfredsson & (Sweden) Anders Forsbrand	2 strokes	(United States) Pearl Sinn & (United States) Bryan Norton	Mixed-team event (unofficial)	US$30,000 each

Major championships in bold.

== Order of Merit rankings ==
Rank	Player	Prize money (£)
1	(Australia) Corinne Dibnah	89,058
2	(Sweden) Helen Alfredsson	75,900
3	(Scotland) Dale Reid	64,494
4	(Belgium) Florence Descampe	54,874
5	(England) Laura Davies	49,552
6	(England) Penny Grice-Whittaker	45,904
7	(England) Alison Nicholas	37,668
8	(France) Marie-Laure de Lorenzi	37,348
9	(England) Kitrina Douglas	34,061
10	(England) Suzanne Strudwick	30,980

== See also ==
- 1991 LPGA Tour
