= 1987 Ladies European Tour =

Professional women's golf tour

1987 Ladies European Tour season
- Duration: May 1987 – October 1987
- Number of official events: 24
- Order of Merit: (Scotland) Dale Reid

The 1987 Ladies European Tour was a series of golf tournaments for elite female golfers from around the world which took place in 1987. The tournaments were sanctioned by the Ladies European Tour (LET).

== Tournaments ==
The table below shows the 1987 schedule. The numbers in brackets after the winners' names show the number of career wins they had on the Ladies European Tour up to and including that event. This is only shown for members of the tour.

Date	Tournament	Location	Winner	Score	Margin of victory	Runner(s)-up	Winner's share (£)	Note
2 May	Ford Ladies Classic	England	(Scotland) Gillian Stewart (2)	289 (−7)	Playoff	(Australia) Corinne Dibnah	4,500	
17 May	Letting French Open	France	(Sweden) Liselotte Neumann (4)	293 (−7)	5 strokes	(England) Laura Davies	10,500	New tournament
24 May	British Olivetti Tournament	England	(Scotland) Jane Connachan (4)	286 (−6)	Playoff	(England) Trish Johnson	3,750	
31 May	Ulster Volkswagen Classic	Northern Ireland	(Scotland) Dale Reid (13)	283 (−9)	8 strokes	(England) Beverley New (South Africa) Sonja Van Wyk	4,500	
6 Jun	McEwan's Wirral Classic	England	(England) Trish Johnson (1)	292 (−4)	Playoff	(Australia) Karen Lunn	3,750	
14 Jun	Belgian Ladies Godiva Open	Belgium	(France) Marie-Laure de Lorenzi (1)	285 (−7)	2 strokes	(England) Trish Johnson (United States) Susan Moon	7,500	
21 Jun	Volmac Ladies Open	Netherlands	(Scotland) Dale Reid (14)	283 (−5)	3 strokes	(Northern Ireland) Maureen Garner	7,500	
28 Jun	Portuguese Ladies Open	Portugal	(Scotland) Cathy Panton (13)	210 (−9)	1 stroke	(England) Alison Nicholas	3,750	
5 Jul	Hennessy Cognac Ladies Cup	France	(England) Kitrina Douglas (4)	283 (−5)	3 strokes	(United States) Nancy Lopez (Italy) Federica Dassù	10,500	
12 Jul	La Manga Club Ladies European Open	England	(Scotland) Dale Reid (15)	272 (−20)	4 strokes	(Australia) Corinne Dibnah	7,500	
25 Jul	Bloor Homes Eastleigh Classic	England	(England) Trish Johnson (2)	242 (−22)	11 strokes	(Australia) Corinne Dibnah	4,500	
2 Aug	**Weetabix Women's British Open**	England	(England) Alison Nicholas (1)	296 (+4)	1 stroke	(England) Laura Davies (United States) Muffin Spencer-Devlin	15,000	
9 Aug	BMW Ladies' German Open	Germany	(France) Marie-Laure de Lorenzi (2)	275 (−13)	5 strokes	(Scotland) Dale Reid	9,000	
16 Aug	Kristianstad Ladies Open	Sweden	Cancelled					
23 Aug	Aspeboda Ladies Open	Sweden	Cancelled					
30 Aug	Borås European Masters	Sweden	Cancelled					
6 Sep	Bowring Ladies Scottish Open	Scotland	(Scotland) Dale Reid (16)	285 (−3)	Playoff	(England) Laura Davies	4,500	
14 Sep	Italian Ladies' Open	Italy	(England) Laura Davies (6)	285 (−3)	1 stroke	(Sweden) Liselotte Neumann	9,000	New tournament
26 Sep	Laing Ladies Classic	England	(England) Alison Nicholas (2)	281 (−11)	2 strokes	(Australia) Corinne Dibnah	4,500	
4 Oct	James Capel Guernsey Open	Guernsey	(Australia) Corinne Dibnah (3)	275 (−13)	10 strokes	(Scotland) Gillian Stewart (England) Vanessa Marvin	4,500	
	Hong Kong Bank Jersey Classic	Jersey	(Sweden) Marie Wennersten	148 (+4)	1 stroke	(United States) Peggy Conley (Australia) Corinne Dibnah	1,000	Unofficial event
25 Oct	Woolmark Ladies Match Play Championship	England	(England) Trish Johnson (3)	4 and 3		(France) Marie-Laure de Lorenzi	6,000	Match play event
	Qualitair Ladies' Spanish Open	Spain	(Australia) Corinne Dibnah (4)	210 (−12)	Playoff	(United States) Susan Moon	4,500	

Major championship in bold.

== Order of Merit rankings ==
Rank	Player	Country	Money (£)
1	Dale Reid	Scotland	53,815
2	Laura Davies	England	47,151
3	Corinne Dibnah	Australia	40,474
4	Alison Nicholas	England	36,694
5	Trish Johnson	England	35,718
6	Marie-Laure de Lorenzi	France	33,746
7	Kitrina Douglas	Scotland	32,864
8	Liselotte Neumann	Sweden	26,873
9	Jane Connachan	Scotland	22,588
10	Debbie Dowling	England	21,497

== See also ==
- 1987 LPGA Tour
