= EMS Masters =

Golf tournament

Tournament information
- Location: Lisbon, Portugal
- Established: 1988
- Course: Quinta Da Marinha
- Par: 71
- Length: 5,845 yards (5,345 m)
- Tour: Ladies European Tour
- Format: Stroke play
- Prize fund: £50,000
- Month played: May
- Final year: 1988

Tournament record score
- Aggregate: 213 Laurette Maritz
- To par: E as above

Final champion
- (South Africa) Laurette Maritz

Location map
- Location in Portugal

The EMS Masters was a golf tournament on the Ladies European Tour (LET). It was played in 1988 on the Quinta Da Marinha golf course near Lisbon, Portugal.

LET rookie Laurette Maritz of South Africa won the inaugural event, two weeks after she was victorious at the Marbella Ladies Open in her LET debut, on her way to secure the LET Rookie of the Year title. She finished 3 strokes ahead of a quartet made up of Tania Abitbol, Karen Lunn, Alison Nicholas and Marie Wennersten-From.

As of 2022, the EMS Masters was the only Portuguese tournament, other than the Portuguese Ladies Open which ran intermittently between 1985 and 2011, to feature on the LET. Portugal also hosted the Azores Ladies Open on the LET Access Series between 2011 and 2017.

== Winner ==
Year	Winner	Score	To par	Margin of victory	Runners-up
1988	(South Africa) Laurette Maritz	213	E	3 strokes	(Spain) Tania Abitbol (Australia) Karen Lunn (England) Alison Nicholas (Sweden) Marie Wennersten-From
