= 1980 Ladies European Tour =

Golf tournament series

1980 Ladies European Tour season
- Duration: May 1980 – October 1980
- Number of official events: 18
- Order of Merit: (Scotland) Muriel Thomson

The 1980 Ladies European Tour was the second season of golf tournaments organised by the Women's Professional Golfers' Association (WPGA), which later became the Ladies European Tour (LET). The tour was principally sponsored by Carlsberg, who organised ten 36-hole tournaments counting towards their own Order of Merit. There were eleven other tournaments on the schedule including the Women's British Open, organised by the Ladies' Golf Union.

The Order of Merit was won by Muriel Thomson, who also topped the Carlsberg Order of Merit.

== Tournaments ==
The table below shows the 1980 schedule. The numbers in brackets after the winners' names show the number of career wins they had on the Ladies European Tour up to and including that event. This is only shown for members of the tour.

Date	Tournament	Location	Winner	Score	Margin of victory	Runner(s)–up	Winner's share (£)	Ref
2 May	Carlsberg Championship – Tyrrells Wood	England	(Scotland) Muriel Thomson (1)	141 (−3)	2 strokes	(England) Jane Panter	610	
9 May	Carlsberg Championship – Queen's Park	England	(England) Christine Trew (2)	150 (+2)	5 strokes	(Scotland) Muriel Thomson	250	
23 May	Carlsberg Championship – Blairgowrie	England	(England) Beverly Huke (2)	144 (−8)	7 strokes	(United States) Susan Moon (England) Christine Sharp	250	
30 May	Carlsberg Championship – Gleddoch House	Scotland	(Scotland) Wilma Aitken (1, a)	147 (+3)	2 strokes	(England) Vanessa Marvin (England) Joanna Smurthwaite	450 (Note: As an amateur, Aitken received a voucher for £150, the maximum allowed under the rules of amateur status. The first and second place money was shared by runners-up, Marvin and Smurthwaite.)	
13 Jun	Carlsberg Championship – Knowle	England	(England) Christine Langford (4)	142 (−6)	1 stroke	(England) Sue Bamford	250	
20 Jun	Billingham Golf Championship	England	(England) Christine Sharp (1)	150 (+4)	Playoff	(England) Beverly Lewis	330	
26 Jun	Volvo International Tournament	Sweden	(England) Jenny Lee Smith (2)	149 (+5)	2 strokes	(England) Mickey Walker		
4 Jul	Carlsberg Championship – Finham Park	England	(Scotland) Dale Reid (1)	139 (−9)	7 strokes	(Scotland) Cathy Panton (England) Joanne Smurthwaite	250	
11 Jul	Carlsberg Championship – Arcot Hall	England	(England) Maxine Burton (1)	144 (+2)	2 strokes	(Scotland) Dale Reid	250	
26 Jul	**Women's British Open**	England	(United States) Debbie Massey (n/a)	294 (+2)	1 stroke	(Spain) Marta Figueras-Dotti (Scotland) Belle Robertson	4,500	
1 Aug	Elizabeth Ann Classic	England	(Scotland) Cathy Panton (3)	289 (−11)	5 strokes	(England) Jenny Lee Smith	1,500	
8 Aug	Carlsberg Championship – Shifnal	England	(England) Jenny Lee Smith (3)	142	1 stroke	(England) Mickey Walker	250	
15 Aug	Carlsberg Championship – Sand Moor	England	(England) Christine Trew (3)	148 (+2)	Playoff	(Scotland) Muriel Thomson	250	
22 Aug	Robert Winsor Productions Championship	England	(England) Jenny Lee Smith (4)	146 (−2)	1 stroke	(England) Jane Panter (Scotland) Muriel Thomson	350	
29 Aug	McEwan's Lager Welsh Classic	Wales	(Sweden) Kärstin Ehrnlund (1)	142 (−2) (Note: The final round was abandoned when the course became flooded following a thunderstorm; tournament results were based on scores after the second round.)	2 strokes	(England) Jane Chapman	600	
6 Sep	Manchester Evening News Pro-Am Classic	England	(England) Jenny Lee Smith (5)	220 (+1)	3 strokes	(Wales) Pam Chugg (England) Vanessa Marvin	600	
12 Sep	Hitachi Tournament	England	(United States) Susan Moon (2)	222 (E)	4 strokes	(England) Maxine Burton (England) Mickey Walker	600	
27 Sep	Viscount Double Glazing Championship	Northern Ireland	(Scotland) Muriel Thomson (2)	236 (+8)	4 strokes	(Scotland) Dale Reid (England) Jenny Lee Smith	600	
3 Oct	Carlsberg Championship – Tyrrells Wood	England	(England) Ruth Barry (1)	140 (−4)	3 strokes	(England) Maxine Burton (United States) Susan Moon	250	
9 Oct	Barnham Broom Championship	England	(Scotland) Muriel Thomson (3)	230 (+8)	4 strokes	(England) Maxine Burton	600	
18 Oct	Lambert & Butler Matchplay	England	(England) Mickey Walker (2)	3 and 1		(Sweden) Kärstin Ehrnlund	2,000	

Major championship in bold.

== Order of Merit and money list ==
The Order of Merit was sponsored by Hambro Life and based on a points system.

Place	Player	Points	Money (£)	Events
1	(Scotland) Muriel Thomson		8,008	
2	(England) Maxine Burton		6,038	
3	(England) Jenny Lee Smith		5,620	
4	(United States) Susan Moon		5,172	
5	(England) Mickey Walker		5,744	
6	(England) Jane Panter		3,632	
7	(Scotland) Catherine Panton		4,632	
8	(England) Joanne Smurthwaite		2,555	
9	(Sweden) Kärstin Ehrnlund		3,854	
10	(England) Vanessa Marvin		3,403	

=== Carlsberg Order of Merit ===
The Carlsberg Order of Merit was based on performances in the ten Carslberg sponsored tournaments during the season, with the top three in the standings sharing a prize fund of £5,000.

Place	Player	Prize (£)
1	(Scotland) Muriel Thomson	2,500
2	(England) Maxine Burton	1,500
3	(United States) Susan Moon	1,000
4	(England) Jane Panter	

== See also ==
- 1980 LPGA Tour
