= 1982 Ladies European Tour =

Golf tournament series

1982 Ladies European Tour season
- Duration: May 1983 – October 1983
- Number of official events: 18
- Order of Merit: (England) Jenny Lee Smith

The 1982 Ladies European Tour was the fourth season of golf tournaments organised by the Women's Professional Golfers' Association (WPGA), which later became the Ladies European Tour (LET). There were ten tournaments on the schedule including the Women's British Open, organised by the Ladies' Golf Union.

The tour experienced difficulties during 1982. Having lost several sponsors during 1981 due to economic problems, their principal supporter Carlsberg had also departed. Twelve new tournaments were planned to fill out the calendar but only half took place, including Ford Ladies Classic and the Ladies Spanish Open. Plans for new events in Ireland, France, West Germany and Portugal were abandoned, and several other tournaments were cancelled during the season, including the British Women's Matchplay and two of the new events.

The Order of Merit was won for the second time by Jenny Lee Smith, who again dominated the season with one win and five runner-up finishes; her £12,551 in prize money put her more than £5,500 clear of runner-up Rosie Jones.

== Tournaments ==
The table below shows the 1982 schedule. The numbers in brackets after the winners' names show the number of career wins they had on the Ladies European Tour up to and including that event. This is only shown for members of the tour.

Date	Tournament	Location	Winner	Score	Margin of victory	Runner(s)–up	Winner's share (£)	Ref
9 May	Ford Ladies Classic	England	(England) Jenny Lee Smith (9)	305 (+9)	4 strokes	(Scotland) Dale Reid	3,000	
14 May	United Friendly Worthing Open	England	(United States) Rosie Jones (1)	217 (−2)	6 strokes	(England) Mickey Walker	325	
30 May	Smirnoff Ulster Open	Northern Ireland	(United States) Linda Bowman (1)	225 (+3)	Playoff	(England) Jenny Lee Smith	1,000	
18 Jun	United Friendly Insurance Championship	England	(England) Beverley New (1, a)	212 (−1)	2 strokes	(England) Jenny Lee Smith	1,500 (Note: As an amateur, New was not eligible for the prize money; the £1,500 for first place went to runner-up Lee Smith.)	
30 Jun	Guernsey Open	Guernsey	(Scotland) Dale Reid (4)	219 (+3)	3 strokes	(United States) Linda Bowman	700	
9 Jul	McEwan's Lager Welsh Classic	Wales	Cancelled					
23 Jul	Ladies Spanish Open	Spain	(United States) Rosie Jones (2)	224 (+8)	5 strokes	(England) Jenny Lee Smith	900	
31 Jul	**Pretty Polly Women's British Open**	England	(Spain) Marta Figueras-Dotti (1, a)	296 (E)	1 stroke	(United States) Rosie Jones (England) Jenny Lee Smith	6,000 (Note: As an amateur, Figueras-Dotti was not eligible for the prize money; the £6,000 for first place and £3,000 for second place was shared between runners-up Jones and Lee Smith.)	
7 Aug	British Women's Matchplay	England	Cancelled					
13 Aug	West of England Open	England	Cancelled					
25 Aug	Dunhill Classic	England	(England) Bridget Cooper (1)	147 (−3)	7 strokes	(United States) Lori West (Scotland) Cathy Panton	900	
3 Sep	WPGA Championship	Scotland	Cancelled					
12 Sep	Moben Kitchens Classic	England	(Scotland) Cathy Panton (6)	216 (−3)	1 stroke	(England) Jenny Lee Smith	1,000	
1 Oct	NatWest East Anglian Open	England	(United States) Linda Bowman (2)	215 (−1)	1 stroke	(Scotland) Muriel Thomson	700	

Major championships in bold.

== Order of Merit ==
The Order of Merit was sponsored by Hambro Life and based on prize money won throughout the season.

Place	Player	Money (£)	Events
1	(England) Jenny Lee Smith	12,551	
2	(United States) Rosie Jones	7,026	
3	(Scotland) Muriel Thomson	5,529	
4	(Scotland) Dale Reid	5,358	
5	(Scotland) Catherine Panton	5,137	
6	(United States) Linda Bowman	4,877	
7	(England) Mickey Walker	4,397	
8	(England) Julie Cole	4,325	
9	(England) Beverly Lewis	3,592	
10	(England) Sue Latham	3,251	

== See also ==
- 1982 LPGA Tour
