= Anna Oxenstierna =

Swedish golfer

Personal information
- Full name: Anna Iliana Maria Gabriella Oxenstierna
- Nationality: Sweden
- Born: 13 June 1963 (age 63)

Career
- Sport: Golf
- Turned professional: 1987
- Former tours: Ladies European Tour; Swedish Golf Tour
- Professional wins: 3

Number of wins by tour
- Ladies European Tour: 1
- Other: 2

Anna Iliana Maria Gabriella Oxenstierna (born 13 June 1963) is a retired Swedish professional golfer and Ladies European Tour player. She won the European Lady Junior's Team Championship twice and the 1989 TEC Players Championship in England.

== Early life and family ==
Born into an athletic and golfing family, her father Thure Gabriel Oxenstierna is the architect of Roslagen Golf Club, where her brother Alexander later became the general manager. Her grandfather Johan Gabriel Oxenstierna won gold in modern pentathlon at the 1932 Summer Olympics in Los Angeles.

== Amateur career ==
Oxenstierna joined the Swedish National Team in 1978 and represented Sweden five times at the European Lady Junior's Team Championship, winning the 1981 and 1984 editions and finishing runner-up in 1982 and 1983. She finished third at the 1983 European Ladies' Team Championship in Waterloo, Belgium, and fourth at the 1985 edition in Stavanger, Norway. She formed the Swedish team, with Liselotte Neumann and Viveca Hoff, that finished seventh at the 1984 Espirito Santo Trophy in Hong Kong .

Individually, she won the 1983 Swedish International Stroke Play Championship, at the time the most prestigious amateur tournament in the nation. She also won the 72-hole tournament Pierre Robert Cup at Falsterbo Golf Club in both 1981 and 1984. She was semi-finalist at the Swedish Matchplay Championship in 1988 and 1994.

== Professional career ==
Oxenstierna turned professional ahead of the 1987 season and played on the Swedish Golf Tour where she was runner-up at the 1987 Delsjö Ladies Open. She finished the 1987 season third on Swedish Golf Tour Order of Merit, and in 1988 she finished second, behind Sofia Grönberg. In 1989 she won the IBM Ladies Open and Ängsö Ladies Open.

Oxenstierna also joined the Ladies European Tour, where she won the 1989 TEC Players Championship two strokes ahead of Laurette Maritz, to become the fifth Swedish LET winner after Kärstin Ehrnlund, Marie Wennersten, Liselotte Neumann and Sofia Grönberg. In 1990 she was runner-up at the WPG European Tour Classic, 2 strokes behind Tania Abitbol of Spain.

== Later career ==
Oxenstierna earned a degree in business and economics from the Stockholm School of Economics. She later worked in investor relations and corporate communications, including as Head of Investor Relations at Volvo Cars during the company's 2021 initial public offering.

== Amateur wins ==
- 1981 Pierre Robert Cup
- 1983 Swedish International Stroke Play Championship
- 1984 Pierre Robert Cup

== Professional wins (3) ==
=== Ladies European Tour (1) ===
No.	Date	Tournament	Winning score	To par	Margin of victory	Runner-up
1	9 Jul 1989	TEC Players Championship	286	−6	2 strokes	(South Africa) Laurette Maritz

=== Swedish Golf Tour (2) ===
No.	Date	Tournament	Winning score	To par	Margin of victory	Runner-up	Ref
1	4 Jun 1989	IBM Ladies Open	216	−3	9 strokes	(Sweden) Pia Nilsson	
2	18 Jun 1989	Ängsö Ladies Open	221	+5	1 stroke	(Sweden) Helen Alfredsson	

== Team appearances ==
Amateur

- European Lady Junior's Team Championship (representing Sweden): 1980, 1981 (winners), 1982, 1983, 1984 (winners)
- European Ladies' Team Championship (representing Sweden): 1983, 1985
- Espirito Santo Trophy (representing Sweden): 1984
- Vagliano Trophy (representing the Continent of Europe): 1985
