= Beverly Lewis =

Beverly Lewis may refer to:

- Beverly Lewis (golfer) (1947–2019), English professional golfer and author
- Beverly Lewis (author) (born 1949), American Christian fiction novelist
- Beverly O'Neill (née Lewis; born 1930), American politician
