= TEC Players Championship =

Tournament information
- Location: England
- Established: 1988
- Courses: Patshull Park G&CC
- Par: 72
- Tour: Ladies European Tour
- Format: 72-hole stroke play
- Final year: 1990

Tournament record score
- Aggregate: 286 Anna Oxenstierna (1989)
- To par: −6 as above

Final champion
- (Australia) Anne Jones

The TEC Players Championship was a women's professional golf tournament on the Ladies European Tour (LET). The tournament was held annually between 1988 and 1990 at various venues in England.

== Winners ==
Year	Venue	Winner	Score	Margin of victory	Runner(s)-up	Winner's share (£)
TEC Players Championship
1990	Patshull Park	(Australia) Anne Jones	287 (−1)	1 stroke	(South Africa) Laurette Maritz	12,000
1989	The Tytherington Club	(Sweden) Anna Oxenstierna	286 (−6)	2 strokes	(South Africa) Laurette Maritz	11,250
Toshiba Players Championship
1988	Old Thorns	(Scotland) Dale Reid	294 (+2)	Playoff	(United States) Peggy Conley	7,500
