= 1983 Ladies European Tour =

Professional women's golf tour

1983 Ladies European Tour season
- Duration: May 1983 – October 1983
- Number of official events: 18
- Order of Merit: (Scotland) Muriel Thomson

The 1983 Ladies European Tour was the fifth season of golf tournaments organised on behalf of the Women's Professional Golfers' Association (WPGA), which later became the Ladies European Tour (LET). There were 17 tournaments on the schedule.

There was a major organisational change from the end of the 1982 season, which ended with the future of the tour in doubt after several tournaments were cancelled. Following action in the High Court, the departure of executive director Barry Edwards, who was also responsible for the tour's marketing, was secured, and administration of the tour was taken over by the Professional Golfers' Association (PGA). The new executive director of the WPGA was Colin Snape, who had previously been a director at the PGA.

There were twelve new tournaments on the calendar, and only half of the ten from the previous season survived. The Women's British Open, which was to have been jointly sanctioned by the LPGA Tour and by far the richest event on the schedule, was cancelled when sponsors Hitachi withdrew due to the failure of organisers, the Ladies Golf Union, to secure television coverage.

The Order of Merit was won for the second time by Muriel Thomson.

== Tournaments ==
The table below shows the 1983 schedule. The numbers in brackets after the winners' names show the number of career wins they had on the Ladies European Tour up to and including that event. This is only shown for members of the tour.

| Date | Tournament | Location | Winner | Score | Margin of victory | Runner(s)–up | Winner's share (£) | Ref |
|---|---|---|---|---|---|---|---|---|
| 7 May | Ford Ladies Classic | England | (West Germany) Barbara Helbig (1) | 298 (−2) | 4 strokes | (Spain) Marta Figueras-Dotti | 3,000 | |
| 21 May | Smirnoff Ladies Irish Open | Northern Ireland | (Scotland) Cathy Panton (7) | 224 (+2) | Playoff | (England) Beverly Lewis (United States) Susan Moon (Scotland) Muriel Thomson | 1,500 | |
| 10 Jun | United Friendly Worthing Open | England | (Spain) Marta Figueras-Dotti (2) | 217 (+4) | 5 strokes | (England) Beverly Huke | 750 | |
| 18 Jun | UBM Northern Classic | England | (Scotland) Cathy Panton (8) | 210 (−3) | 5 strokes | (England) Jane Forrest | 1,000 | |
| 29 Jun | Guernsey Open | Guernsey | (Spain) Marta Figueras-Dotti (3) | 209 (−7) | 3 strokes | (England) Beverly Huke | 890 | |
| 7 Jul | Colt Cars Jersey Open | Jersey | (England) Debbie Dowling (1) | 215 (+2) | 1 stroke | (England) Jenny Lee Smith | 890 | |
| 22 Jul | British Olivetti Tournament | England | (Australia) Sandra Mackenzie (1) | 223 (+7) | 1 stroke | (England) Jane Forrest | 900 | |
| 29 Jul | United Friendly Tournament | England | (Scotland) Dale Reid (5) | 216 (−6) | 2 strokes | (England) Maxine Burton | 1,000 | |
| 31 Jul | Middlesbrough Municipal Ladies Classic | England | (England) Beverly Lewis (2) | 144 (E) | 2 strokes | (Scotland) Muriel Thomson (England) Mickey Walker | 500 | |
| 5 Aug | Playford Lark Valley Classic | England | (England) Beverly Huke (3) (England) Judy Statham (1) | 138 (−4) | Tie | | 350 each | |
| 10 Aug | White Horse Whisky Challenge | England | (England) Beverly Huke (4) | 207 (−12) | 1 stroke | (Scotland) Muriel Thomson | 600 | |
| 24 Aug | Lilley Brook Cotswold Ladies Classic | England | (Scotland) Dale Reid (6) | 139 (−9) | 2 strokes | (Sweden) Kärstin Ehrnlund (Zimbabwe) Elizabeth Glass | 750 | |
| 31 Aug | Melcade International Tournament | England | (England) Debbie Dowling (2) | 142 (E) | 1 stroke | (England) Joanna Smurthwaite | 500 | |
| 4 Sep | Clandeboye Pro-Am Classic | Northern Ireland | (England) Christine Sharp (2) | 154 (+6) | Playoff | (Scotland) Muriel Thomson | 600 | |
| 11 Sep | Dunham Forest Pro-Am | England | (Scotland) Cathy Panton (9) | 142 (−2) | 2 strokes | (England) Mickey Walker | 600 | |
| 2 Oct | Women's British Open | England | Cancelled | | | | | |
| 9 Oct | Caldy Classic | England | (Scotland) Dale Reid (7) | 225 (+3) | 1 stroke | (England) Maxine Burton (England) Jo Rumsey | 700 | |
| 19 Oct | Sands International | England | (England) Mickey Walker (4) | 233 (+11) | 1 stroke | (England) Vanessa Marvin | 700 | |

== Order of Merit ==
The Order of Merit was based on a points system.

| Place | Player | Points | Money (£) |
|---|---|---|---|
| 1 | (Scotland) Muriel Thomson | 1,233 | 8,899 |
| 2 | (England) Mickey Walker | 1,185 | 7,827 |
| 3 | (England) Beverly Huke | 1,146 | 9,225 |
| 4 | (Scotland) Dale Reid | 1,143 | 8,504 |
| 5 | (England) Vanessa Marvin | 988 | 6,881 |
| 6 | (England) Maxine Burton | 905 | 5,629 |
| 7 | (Sweden) Kärstin Ehrnlund | 880 | 5,428 |
| 8 | (England) Debbie Dowling | 866 | 5,504 |
| 9 | (England) Jane Forrest | 826 | 5,497 |
| 10 | (England) Christine Sharp | 800 | 4,068 |

== See also ==
- 1983 LPGA Tour
