= Biarritz Ladies Open =

Tournament information
- Location: Biarritz, France
- Established: 1988
- Course: Golf de Biarritz-Le Phare
- Tour: Ladies European Tour
- Format: 72-hole Stroke play
- Final year: 1990

Tournament record score
- Aggregate: 267 Laura Davies
- To par: −9 As above

Final champion
- (England) Laura Davies

The Biarritz Ladies Open was a women's professional golf tournament on the Ladies European Tour held in Biarritz, France. It was first played in 1988 and held annually until 1990.

== Winners ==
Year	Winner	Country	Score	Margin of victory	Runner-up
AGF Biarritz Ladies Open
1990	Laura Davies	England	136 (−8)	1 stroke	(England) Alison Nicholas
1989	Dennise Hutton	Australia	274 (−2)	Playoff	(United States) Peggy Conley
Biarritz Ladies Open
1988	Laura Davies	England	267 (−9)	1 stroke	(France) Marie-Laure de Lorenzi-Taya

== See also ==
- Biarritz Ladies Classic
