= Bowring Birmingham Ladies Classic =

Golf tournament

Birmingham Ladies Classic
Tournament information
- Location: Birmingham, England
- Established: 1980
- Course: Pype Hayes Golf Club
- Tour: Ladies European Tour
- Format: Stroke play
- Prize fund: £20,000
- Month played: June
- Final year: 1985

Final champion
- (Italy) Federica Dassù

Location map
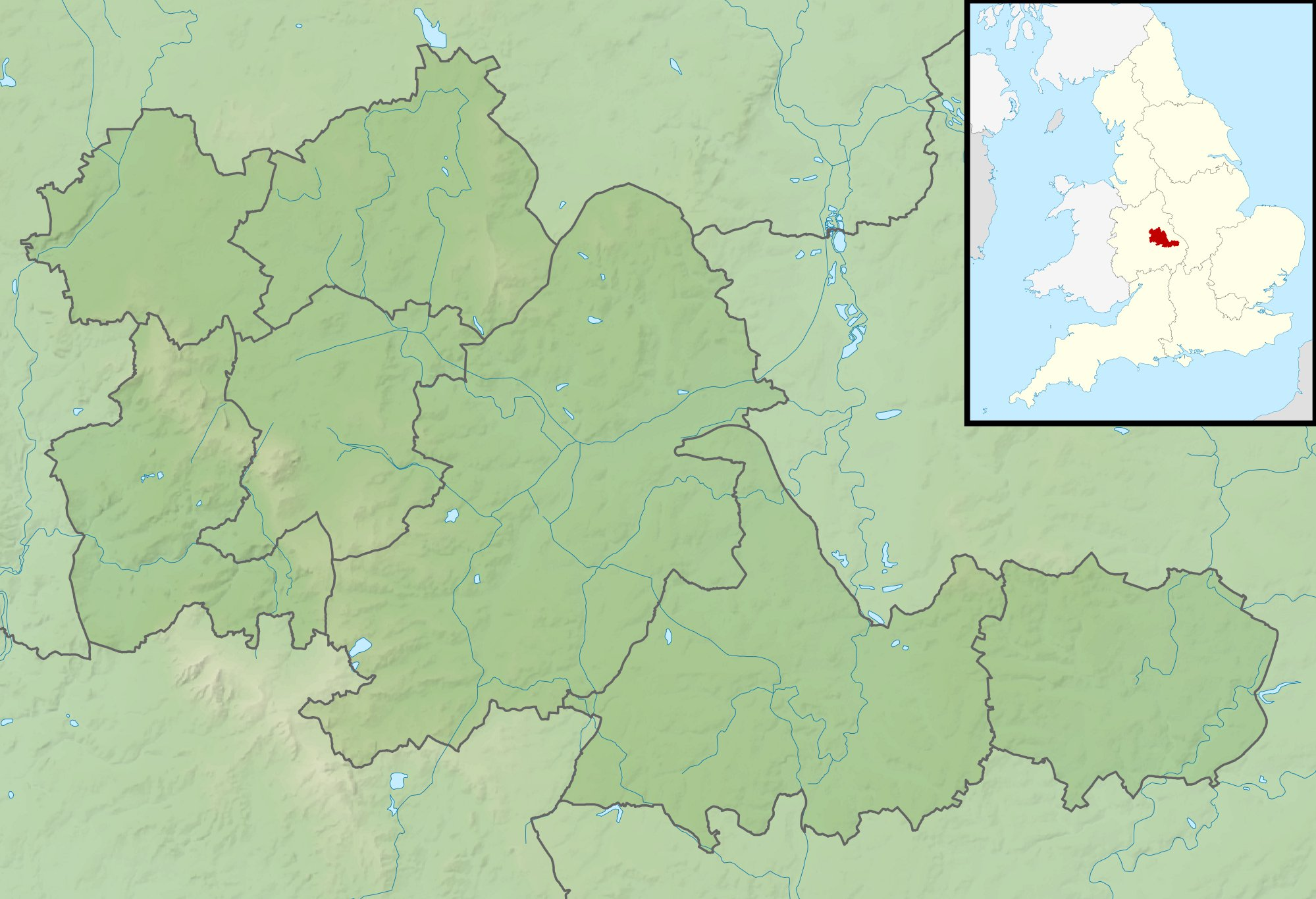
- Location in England Location in West Midlands

The Bowring Birmingham Ladies Classic was a women's professional golf tournament on the Ladies European Tour held in Birmingham, England. It was last played in 1985 at Pype Hayes Golf Club.

== History ==
The tournament was always held near Birmingham, West Midlands. The 1980 installment, billed as the Billingham Golf Championship, was held at South Staffordshire Golf Club in Wolverhampton, 13 miles (21 km) northwest of Birmingham. Christine Sharp (later Christine Griffith) won with a birdie on the first playoff hole. In 1985, the tournament returned to the schedule, now as the Bowring Birmingham Ladies Classic, held at Pype Hayes Golf Club, 8 miles (13 km) northeast of Birmingham city center. Italian Federica Dassù beat Debbie Dowling for her second LET title.

== Winners ==
Year	Winner	Score	Margin of victory	Runner-up	Winner's share (£)	Venue	Ref
Bowring Birmingham Ladies Classic
1985	(Italy) Federica Dassù	280 (−4)	2 strokes	(England) Debbie Dowling	2,500	Pype Hayes Golf Club	
1981–1984: No tournament
Billingham Golf Championship
1980	(England) Christine Sharp (1)	150 (+4)	Playoff	(England) Beverly Lewis	330	South Staffs Golf Club	
