= Anne Rollo =

Australian professional golfer

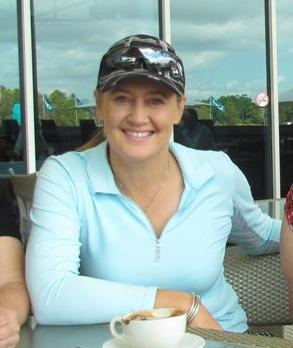

Personal information
- Nationality: Australia
- Born: 1 December 1965 (age 60) Sydney, New South Wales, Australia
- Height: 177 cm (5 ft 10 in)
- Children: 2

Career
- Sport: Golf
- College: San Jose State University
- Turned professional: 1987
- Former tours: Ladies European Tour (1987–1997); ALPG Tour (1990–1993)
- Professional wins: 1

Number of wins by tour
- Ladies European Tour: 1

Achievements and awards
- All American: 1987

Anne Rollo (born Anne Margaret Jones) is an Australian professional golfer who played on the Ladies European Tour (LET).

== Career overview ==
Rollo was born in Sydney, New South Wales, Australia. She played college golf for San Jose State University 1986–1987, culminating in her team, the Spartans, winning the NCAA Division I Women's Golf Championships in 1987 and Rollo tied for first for individual honours, coming runner-up in a playoff and gaining All-American team selection.

Rollo joined the LET in 1987. In her first full year on tour, 1988, she finished 15th on the Order of Merit. In 1990, she won the TEC Players Championship and finished 17th on the Order of Merit.

In 2014, Rollo along with her fellow NCAA winning team members, was inducted into the San Jose State University Sports Hall of Fame.

== Professional wins (1) ==
=== Ladies European Tour wins (1) ===
No.	Date	Tournament	Winning score	Margin of victory	Runner-up
1	9 Sep 1990	TEC Players Championship	−11 (73-66-69-73=281)	2 strokes	(South Africa) Laurette Maritz
