= Ladies European Open =

Tournament information
- Location: England (1984–1990; 1996); Germany (1992–1993)
- Established: 1984
- Tour: Ladies European Tour
- Format: 72-hole Stroke play
- Final year: 1996

Tournament record score
- Aggregate: 272 Dale Reid
- To par: −20 As above

Final champion
- (England) Trish Johnson

The Ladies European Open was a women's professional golf tournament on the Ladies European Tour held in England and Germany. It was first played at The Belfry in 1984 and held annually in England until 1990 with the exception of 1986. The 1992 and 1993 tournaments were held near Munich in Bavaria and the last installment in 1996 was held at Hanbury Manor near London.

== Winners ==
Year	Venue	Winner	Country	Score	Margin of victory	Runner(s)-up	Winner's share (£)
Marks & Spencer European Open
1996	Hanbury Manor	Trish Johnson	England	274 (−14)	5 strokes	(Sweden) Pernilla Sterner, (Australia) Anne-Marie Knight	15,000
1994–95	No tournament						
European Ladies Classic
1993	GC Sagmühle	Mardi Lunn	Australia	287 (−1)	1 stroke	(Sweden) Annika Sörenstam	15,000
European Ladies Open
1992	GC Beuerberg	Laura Davies	England	285 (−11)	2 strokes	(Sweden) Catrin Nilsmark	15,000
1991	No tournament						
Ladies European Open
1990	Kingswood GC	Trish Johnson	England	276 (−12)	2 strokes	(United States) Michelle Estill, (United States) Pearl Sinn	11,250
1989	Kingswood GC	Jane Connachan	Scotland	279 (−13)	3 strokes	(Scotland) Gillian Stewart	10,500
Birchgrey European Open
1988	Kingswood GC	Dale Reid	Scotland	283 (−9)	1 stroke	(England) Alison Nicholas	9,000
La Manga Club Ladies European Open
1987	Ferndown GC	Dale Reid	Scotland	272 (−20)	4 strokes	(Australia) Corinne Dibnah	7,500
1986	No tournament						
IBM Ladies' European Open
1985	Kingswood GC	Liselotte Neumann	Sweden	290 (−2)	2 strokes	(Scotland) Cathy Panton, (England) Susan Moorcraft (a)	7,500
1984	The Belfry (Brabazon)	Gillian Stewart (a)	Scotland	299 (+7)	Playoff	(England) Penny Grice (a)	
