= Dennise Hutton =

Australian golfer

Personal information
- Nationality: Australia
- Born: 1960 (age 65–66)

Career
- Sport: Golf
- College: University of New England
- Turned professional: 1986
- Former tour: Ladies European Tour
- Professional wins: 4

Number of wins by tour
- Ladies European Tour: 2
- Other: 2

Achievements and awards
- Australian Sports Medal: 2000
- NSW PGA Teaching Pro of the Year: 2012

Dennise Hutton (born 1960) is an Australian professional golfer who played on the Ladies European Tour.

== Career ==
Hutton was introduced to golf at age 11 by her father who was greenkeeper/caretaker of the Glen Innes Golf Club in New England, New South Wales. She had success as an amateur and reached the final of the 1980 Australian Women's Amateur. Playing internationally for Australia, she won the 1981 Tasman Cup and the 1982 Queen Sirikit Cup in Sri Lanka with the national team.

Hutton turned professional in 1986 and won the 1986 and 1987 Australian LPGA Championships before starting to play on the Ladies European Tour in 1987. She was runner-up at the 1988 Bloor Homes Eastleigh Classic, a stroke behind compatriot Corinne Dibnah. In 1989, she was runner-up at the BMW Ladies Classic in West Germany before winning the Woolmark Ladies Match Play Championship and AGF Biarritz Ladies Open back-to-back in August. She finished the season 5th in the LET Order of Merit.

Hutton turned to coaching after retiring from professional touring following the birth of her son Sam in 1992, and was awarded the Australian Sports Medal in 2000. She became the head teaching pro at Bonnie Doon Golf Club in Sydney. She was the NSW State Women's coach for five years, and coached Australia's Women's World Cup Team in 2010 and Australia's Youth Olympic Team in 2013.

Hutton was president of the Australian Ladies Professional Golf Association for 5 years, and in 2012 became the first female to be named the NSW/ACT PGA Teaching Professional of the Year.

== Professional wins (4) ==
=== Ladies European Tour wins (2) ===
No.	Date	Tournament	Winning score	Margin of victory	Runner-up
1	22 Oct 1989	Woolmark Ladies Match Play Championship	2 up		(Northern Ireland) Maureen Madill
2	29 Oct 1989	AGF Biarritz Ladies Open	274 (−2)	Playoff	(United States) Peggy Conley

=== Other wins (2) ===
- 1986 Australian LPGA Championship
- 1987 Australian LPGA Championship

== Team appearances ==
Amateur

- Tasman Cup (representing Australia): 1981 (winners)
- Queen Sirikit Cup (representing Australia): 1982 (winners)
