= Rome Classic =

Tournament information
- Location: Rome, Italy
- Established: 1989
- Course: Olgiata Golf Club
- Par: 72
- Tour: Ladies European Tour
- Format: Stroke play
- Prize fund: £80,000
- Month played: April
- Final year: 1991

Final champion
- (England) Laura Davies
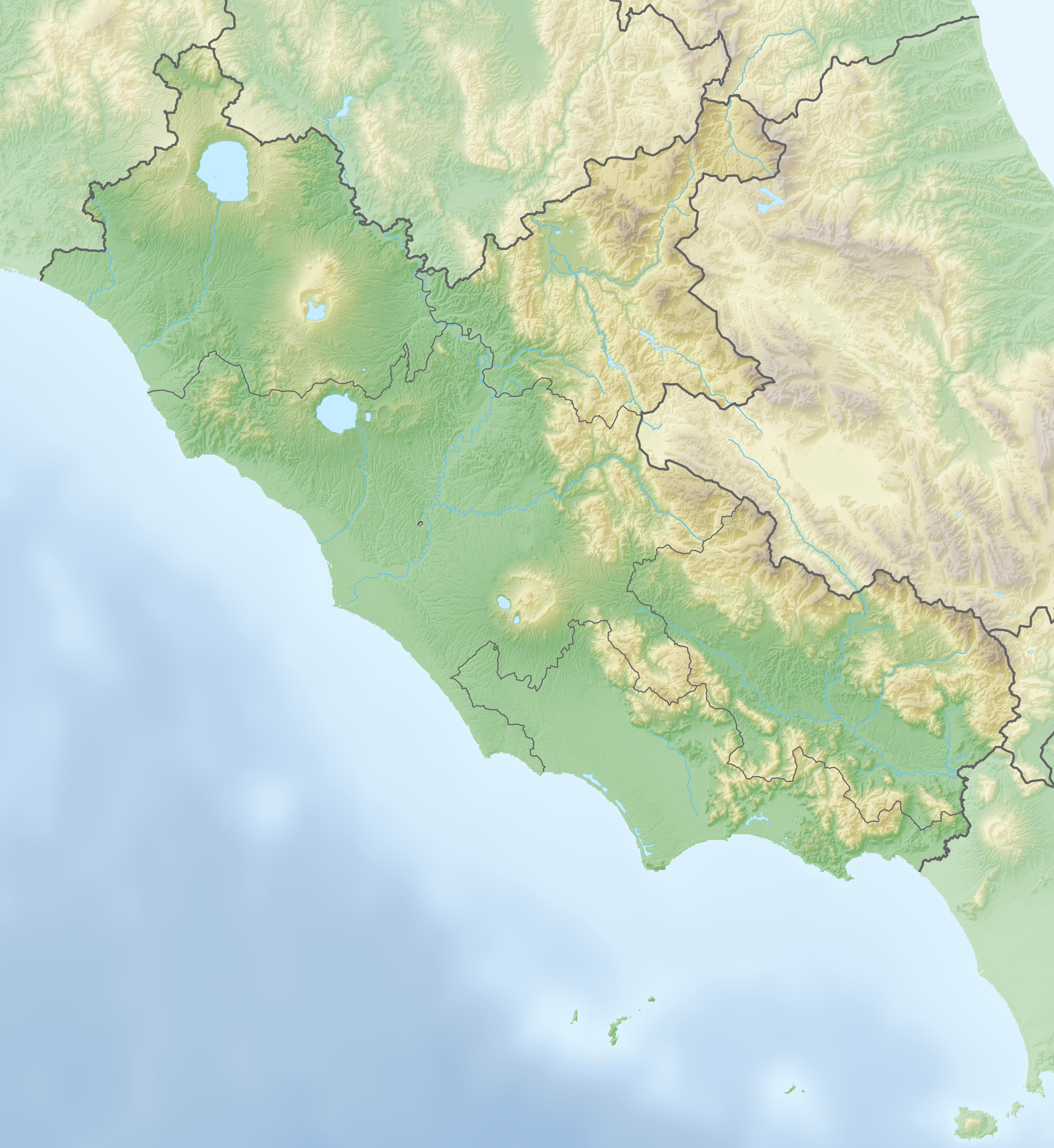
- Location in Italy Location in Lazio

The Rome Classic was a women's professional golf tournament on the Ladies European Tour that took place at the Olgiata Golf Club in Rome, Italy.

The tournament was held in April and served as the season opening tournament for three years, between 1989 and 1991.

In 1991, it was one of a record three LET tournaments in Italy that season, as the Woolmark Ladies Match Play Championship was held near Lake Como and the national open near Venice.

== Winners ==
Year	Winner	Score	To par	Margin of victory	Runner-up	Purse (£)	Ref
Valextra Classic
1991	(England) Laura Davies	281	−7	4 strokes	(Spain) Tania Abitbol	80,000	
1990	(Belgium) Florence Descampe	279	−5	6 strokes	(Scotland) Dale Reid	70,000	
Rome Classic
1989	(Sweden) Sofia Grönberg	210	−6	1 stroke	(France) Marie-Laure Taya	65,000	

== See also ==
- Ladies Italian Open
