= 1993 Ladies European Tour =

Professional women's golf tour

1993 Ladies European Tour season
- Duration: January 1993 – October 1993
- Number of official events: 12
- Order of Merit: (Australia) Karen Lunn

The 1993 Ladies European Tour was a series of golf tournaments for elite female golfers from around the world which took place in 1993. The tournaments were sanctioned by the Ladies European Tour (LET).

== Tournaments ==
The table below shows the 1993 schedule. The numbers in brackets after the winners' names show the number of career wins they had on the Ladies European Tour up to and including that event. This is only shown for members of the tour.

| Dates | Tournament | Location | Winner | Margin of victory | Runner(s)-up | Note | Winner's share (£) |
|---|---|---|---|---|---|---|---|
| | Lalla Meryem Cup | Morocco | (France) Marie-Laure de Lorenzi | | | Unofficial limited-field event | |
| 17 Jan | KRP World Ladies Classic | Malaysia | (Australia) Karen Lunn (6) | Playoff | (France) Sandrine Mendiburu | | |
| 2 May | Ford Ladies Classic | England | (Italy) Federica Dassù (4) | 1 stroke | (Sweden) Annika Sörenstam | | 10,500 |
| 31 May | Holiday Inn Leiden Ladies' Open | Netherlands | (Australia) Corinne Dibnah (12) | 1 stroke | (Sweden) Annika Sörenstam | | 8,250 |
| 27 Jun | BMW European Masters | Belgium | (England) Helen Dobson (1) | 1 stroke | (France) Marie-Laure de Lorenzi, (Scotland) Dale Reid | | 22,500 |
| 4 Jul | Hennessy Ladies Cup | Germany | (Sweden) Liselotte Neumann (7) | Playoff | (England) Laura Davies | | 30,000 |
| 11 Jul | European Ladies Classic | Germany | (Australia) Mardi Lunn (1) | 1 stroke | (Sweden) Annika Sörenstam | | 15,000 |
| 15 Aug | **Weetabix Women's British Open** | England | (Australia) Karen Lunn (6) | 8 strokes | (United States) Brandie Burton | | 50,000 |
| 22 Aug | IBM Ladies Open | Sweden | (England) Lora Fairclough (2) | 3 strokes | (Australia) Corinne Dibnah | | 15,000 |
| 5 Sep | Waterford Dairies Ladies' English Open | England | (England) Laura Davies (16) | 1 stroke | (France) Marie-Laure de Lorenzi | | 9,000 |
| 19 Sep | BMW Italian Ladies' Open | Italy | (Spain) Amaia Arruti (1) | 2 strokes | (Sweden) Annika Sörenstam | | 15,750 |
| 24 Oct | VAR Open de France Feminin | France | (France) Marie-Laure de Lorenzi (14) | 1 stroke | (Italy) Federica Dassù, (Denmark) Karina Orum | | 9,000 |

Major championship in bold.

== Order of Merit rankings ==
| Rank | Player | Prize money (£) |
|---|---|---|
| 1 | (Australia) Karen Lunn | 81,266 |
| 2 | (England) Laura Davies | 64,938 |
| 3 | (Sweden) Annika Sörenstam | 55,927 |
| 4 | (France) Marie-Laure de Lorenzi | 46,479 |
| 5 | (Sweden) Liselotte Neumann | 39,530 |
| 6 | (England) Helen Dobson | 38,179 |
| 7 | (Australia) Corinne Dibnah | 34,429 |
| 8 | (England) Lora Fairclough | 28,625 |
| 9 | (Italy) Federica Dassù | 27,707 |
| 10 | (Scotland) Dale Reid | 25,553 |

== See also ==
- 1993 LPGA Tour
