= KRP World Ladies Classic =

Professional golf tournament

World Ladies Classic
Tournament information
- Location: Kuala Lumpur, Malaysia
- Established: 1993
- Course: Kelab Rahman Putra
- Par: 72
- Tour: Ladies European Tour
- Format: Stroke play
- Prize fund: $300,000
- Month played: January
- Final year: 1993

Final champion
- (Australia) Karen Lunn

The World Ladies Classic was a women's professional golf tournament on the Ladies European Tour that took place in Malaysia. It was only held in 1993 near Kuala Lumpur.

The tournament was held 14–17 January with a purse of $300,000 and was the season opener of the 1993 Ladies European Tour. One caddie collapsed and two players, Susan Elliott and Jennifer Allmark, had to withdraw due to excessive heat.

Karen Lunn won after Sandrine Mendiburu made a double bogey on the second playoff hole.

== Winners ==
Year	Winner	Score	Margin of victory	Runner-up
1993	(Australia) Karen Lunn	−2 (69-70-74-73=286)	Playoff	(France) Sandrine Mendiburu
