= AGF Ladies' Open de Paris =

Women's professional golf tournament

Tournament information
- Location: Versailles, Paris, France
- Established: 1991
- Course: Golf de la Boulie
- Par: 71
- Tour: Ladies European Tour
- Format: 72-hole Stroke play
- Month played: October
- Final year: 1992

Tournament record score
- Aggregate: 275 Alison Nicholas (1992)
- To par: −10 Suzanne Strudwick (1991)

Final champion
- (England) Alison Nicholas

The AGF Ladies' Open de Paris was a women's professional golf tournament on the Ladies European Tour that took place in France. It was held in 1991 and 1992 near Paris.

== Winners ==
| Year | Winner | Score | Margin of victory | Runner(s)-up | Winner's share (£) |
AGF Ladies' Open de Paris
| 1992 | (England) Alison Nicholas | 275 (−9) | 1 stroke | (Peru) Alicia Dibos | 12,000 |
AGF Ladies' Open
| 1991 | (England) Suzanne Strudwick | 278 (−10) | 3 strokes | (England) Laura Davies (Scotland) Catherine Panton-Lewis | 15,000 |
