= Longines Classic =

Tournament information
- Location: Cannes, French Riviera
- Established: 1990
- Course: Cannes Golf Club
- Par: 72
- Tour: Ladies European Tour
- Format: 72-hole stroke play
- Month played: October
- Final year: 1991

Tournament record score
- Aggregate: 277 Penny Grice-Whittaker (1991)
- To par: −11 as above

Final champion
- (England) Penny Grice-Whittaker

The Longines Classic was a women's professional golf tournament on the Ladies European Tour that took place in France. It was held in 1990 near Saint-Raphaël and in 1991 near Cannes, both on the French Riviera.

== Winners ==
Year	Venue	Winner	Score	Margin of victory	Runner(s)-up	Winner's share (£)
1991	Cannes GC	(England) Penny Grice-Whittaker	277 (−11)	1 stroke	(England) Laura Davies (Australia) Corinne Dibnah	16,500
1990	Golf l'Estérel	(England) Trish Johnson	286 (−2)	1 stroke	(Scotland) Gillian Stewart	15,000
