= Telkom Women's Classic =

Golf tournament in South Africa

Tournament information
- Location: South Africa
- Established: 2001
- Course: Zwartkop Country Club
- Par: 72
- Tour: Ladies African Tour
- Format: Stroke play
- Prize fund: R 350,000
- Month played: March
- Final year: 2008

Tournament record score
- Aggregate: 203 Lisa Holm Sørensen
- To par: −13 as above

Final champion
- (Denmark) Lisa Holm Sørensen

Location map
- Location in South Africa Location in Gauteng

The Telkom Women's Classic was a golf tournament on the Ladies African Tour. It was played annually between 2001 and 2008, at various locations in South Africa.

The tournament boasted a considerable international field, with a contingent of Ladies European Tour players complimenting their season with joining the Ladies African Tour.

== Winners ==
Year	Winner	Score	Margin of victory	Runner(s)-up	Venue	Location	Purse (ZAR)	Note
Telkom Women's Classic
2009	Cancelled				Johannesburg Country Club	Johannesburg	350,000	(Note: Due to global economic pressure the Ladies African Tour was suspended for 2009.)
2008	(Denmark) Lisa Holm Sørensen	–13 (66-68-69=203)	2 strokes	(Sweden) Maria Bodén	Zwartkop Country Club	Pretoria	350,000	
2007	(Spain) Tania Elósegui	−12 (67-65-72=204)	1 stroke	(South Africa) Stacy Bregman (England) Rebecca Hudson	Benoni Lakes Country Club	Johannesburg	320,000	
2006	(South Africa) Laurette Maritz	–9 (73-66-68=207)	1 stroke	(England) Rebecca Hudson	Zwartkop Country Club	Pretoria	300,000	
2005	(South Africa) Laurette Maritz	–7 (71-70-68=209)	2 strokes	(Sweden) Antonella Cvitan	Zwartkop Country Club	Pretoria	300,000	
2004	(Finland) Minea Blomqvist	–12 (73-63-68=204)	7 strokes	(South Africa) Ashleigh Simon (a)	Randpark Golf Club	Johannesburg	250,000	
2003								
Telkom Ladies Classic
2002	(Finland) Riikka Hakkarainen				Randpark Golf Club	Johannesburg		
2001					Woodhill Country Club	Pretoria		
