= Trophée Coconut Skol =

Tournament information
- Location: Paris, France
- Established: 1990
- Course: Saint Germain GC
- Par: 72
- Tour: Ladies European Tour
- Format: 72-hole stroke play
- Final year: 1991

Tournament record score
- Aggregate: 276 Helen Alfredsson (1991)
- To par: −12 as above

Final champion
- (Sweden) Helen Alfredsson

The Trophée Coconut Skol was a women's professional golf tournament on the Ladies European Tour that took place in France. It was held in 1990 at Fourqueux and in 1991 at Saint-Germain-en-Laye, both near Paris.

== Winners ==
Year	Venue	Winner	Score	Margin of victory	Runner(s)-up	Winner's share (£)	Ref
Trophée Coconut Skol
1991	Saint Germain GC	(Sweden) Helen Alfredsson	–12 (71-68-66-71=276)	3 strokes	(Scotland) Dale Reid	15,000	
Trophée Internationale Coconut Skol
1990	Fourqueux GC	(Australia) Corinne Dibnah	E (71-75-72-66=284)	1 stroke	(Sweden) Helen Alfredsson (England) Trish Johnson	10,500	
