= BMW Ladies Classic =

Tournament information
- Location: Düsseldorf-Hubbelrath, Germany
- Established: 1989
- Course: Hubbelrath GC
- Par: 72
- Tour: Ladies European Tour
- Format: 72-hole Stroke play
- Final year: 1990

Tournament record score
- Aggregate: 277 Marie-Laure de Lorenzi (1989)
- To par: −11 as above

Final champion
- (England) Diane Barnard

The BMW Ladies Classic was a women's professional golf tournament on the Ladies European Tour that took place near Düsseldorf, Germany.

The 1989 tournament held June 8–11 is notable as it marked Marie-Laure de Lorenzi's third consecutive back-to-back win, a Ladies European Tour record.

== Winners ==
Year	Winner	Country	Score	Margin of victory	Runner-up
1990	Diane Barnard	England	278 (−8)	1 stroke	(Australia) Corinne Dibnah
1989	Marie-Laure de Lorenzi	France	277 (−11)	1 stroke	(Australia) Dennise Hutton
