= Antonella Cvitan =

Swedish golfer and administrator

Personal information
- Full name: Antonella Cvitan Bäckström
- Nationality: Sweden
- Born: 3 September 1980 (age 46) Helsingborg, Sweden
- Spouse: Joakim Bäckström

Career
- Sport: Golf
- Turned professional: 2001
- Former tours: Ladies European Tour (2001–2010); LET Access Series; Swedish Golf Tour; Nedbank Women's Golf Tour
- Professional wins: 5

Best results in LPGA major championships
- Chevron Championship: DNP
- Women's PGA C'ship: DNP
- U.S. Women's Open: DNP
- Women's British Open: CUT: 2006
- Evian Championship: DNP

Achievements and awards
- PGA of Sweden Future Fund: 2013

Antonella Cvitan (born 3 September 1980) is a Swedish professional golfer and former Ladies European Tour player.

== Career ==
Cvitan turned professional in 2001 and joined the Ladies European Tour, having finished 26th at Q-School. She played on the LET until 2010. 2007 was her best season, with top-15 finishes at the Ladies Open of Portugal and Ladies Scottish Open.

Playing on the Nedbank Women's Golf Tour in South Africa several seasons early 2000s, Cvitan was runner-up at the 2005 Telkom Women's Classic in Pretoria, two strokes behind Laurette Maritz, after she birdied her final three holes.

Cvitan won two titles on the Swedish Golf Tour, the 2004 Telia Grand Opening and the 2006 Klitterbyn Ladies Open. In addition, she was runner-up at the 2006 Falköping Ladies Open, 2008 Svensk Biogas Masters, 2008 Kungsängen Queens Masters and the 2009 Körunda Ladies Open.

Cvitan played on the LET Access Series between 2012 and 2014. She won the 2012 Samsø Ladies Open with a par on the first playoff hole, after Nicole Broch Larsen hit her tee shot out of bounds, and was runner-up at the 2013 Ingarö Ladies Open.

Her only major appearance was at the 2006 Women's British Open at Royal Lytham & St Annes Golf Club, where she did not make the cut.

She has been attached to Vasatorp Golf Club and Kristianstad Golf Club.

== Personal life ==
Cvitan married former European Tour player Joakim Bäckström. They won the Swedish Husband-Wife Championship in 2014 and 2019.

== Professional wins (5) ==
=== LET Access Series wins (1) ===
No.	Date	Tournament	Winning score	To par	Margin of victory	Runner-up	Ref
1	18 Aug 2012	Samsø Ladies Open	70-73-70=213	–3	Playoff	(Denmark) Nicole Broch Larsen (a)	

=== Swedish Golf Tour wins (2) ===
No.	Date	Tournament	Winning score	To par	Margin of victory	Runner-up	Ref
1	11 May 2004	Telia Grand Opening	73-67=140	+2	1 stroke	(Denmark) Lisa Holm Sørensen	
2	11 Jun 2006	Klitterbyn Ladies Open	70-65-71=206	–7	1 stroke	(Sweden) Caroline Hedwall	

=== Other wins (2) ===
- 2014 Swedish Husband-Wife Championship (with Joakim Bäckström)
- 2019 Swedish Husband-Wife Championship (with Joakim Bäckström)
