= 1984 Espirito Santo Trophy =

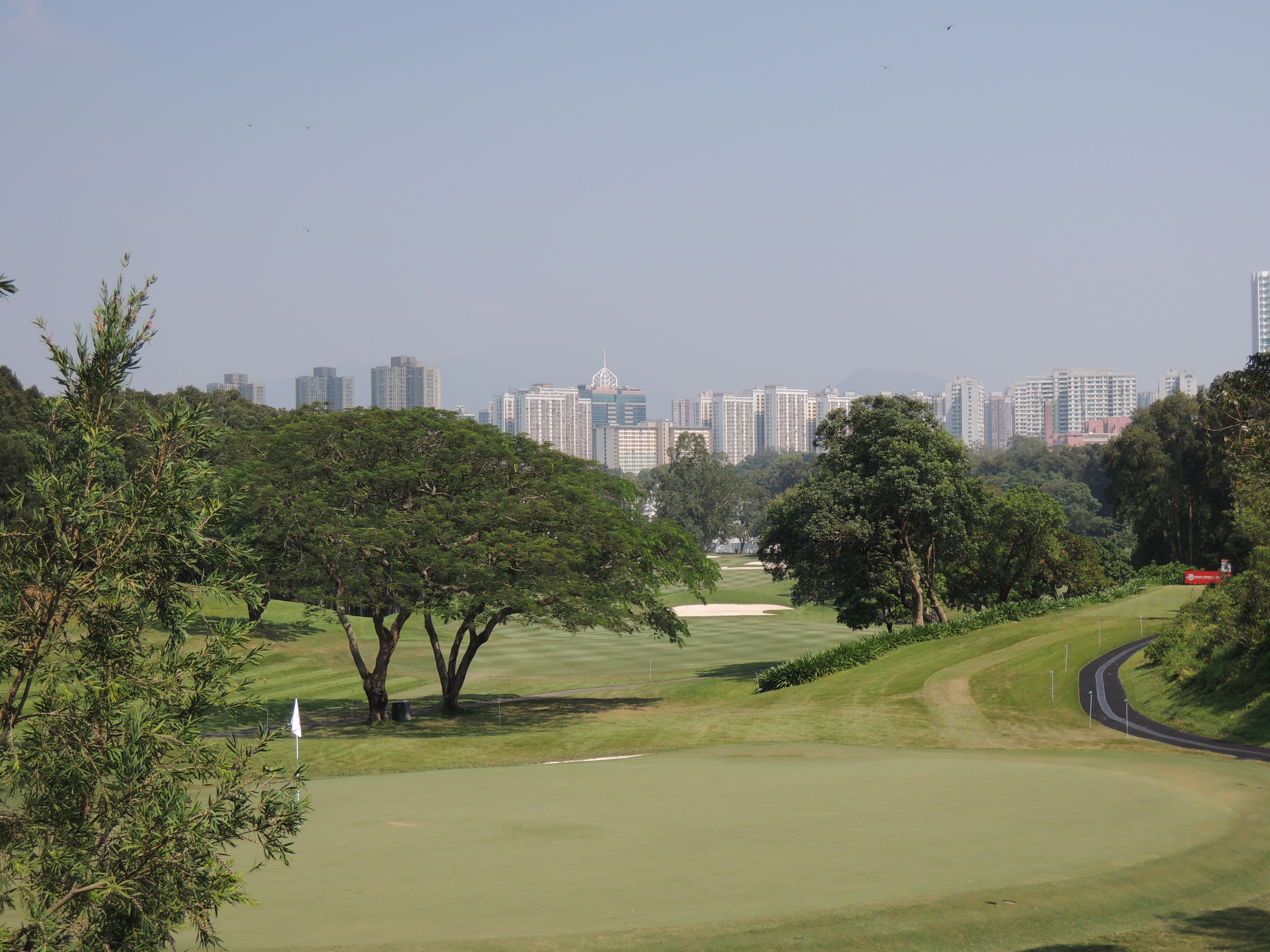
- Eden Course at Royal Hong Kong Golf Club

Tournament information
- Dates: 30 October – 2 November
- Location: Fonling, Hong Kong; 22.496°N 114.120°E
- Course: Royal Hong Kong Golf Club
- Organized by: World Amateur Golf Council
- Format: 72 holes stroke play

Statistics
- Par: 73
- Length: 5,983 yards (5,471 m)
- Field: 22 teams 66 players

Champion
- United States; Heather Farr, Deb Richard, Jody Rosenthal
- 585 (+1)
- Location in East Asia Location in Hong Kong

The 1984 Espirito Santo Trophy took place 30 October – 2 November at Hong Kong Golf Club in Fonling, Hong Kong. It was the 11th women's golf World Amateur Team Championship for the Espirito Santo Trophy. The tournament was a 72-hole stroke play team event with 22 teams, each with three players. The best two scores for each round counted towards the team total.

The United States team won the Trophy, defending the title from two years ago and winning their ninth title, beating team France by two strokes. France earned the silver medal while the combined team of Great Britain and Ireland took the bronze on third place another three strokes behind.

== Teams ==
22 teams contested the event. Each team had three players.

Country	Players
Australia	Louise Briers, Edwina Kennedy, Sandra McCaw
Belgium	Aline Van Der Haegen, Jean-Louise Philipport de Foy, Agathe Verlegh
Brazil	Maria Alicia Gonzales, Isabel D. Lopes, Elisabeth Nickhorn
Canada	Patty Grant, Ann Lavis, Marlene Stewart Streit
Denmark	Anette Peitersen, Tina Pors, Lotta Schmidt
France	Cécilia Mourgue d'Algue, Corine Soules, Valérie Golléty-Pamard
(United Kingdom) Great Britain & Ireland	Penny Grice, Gillian Stewart, Claire White
Hong Kong	Greta Hobbs, Peggy Kwah, Nanette Mann
Indonesia	Bas Tobing, Rien Tobing, Widjil Purnomo
Italy	Emanuelo Braito, Marina Buscani, Elena Girardi
Japan	Michiko Hattori, Yoshiko Ito, Yoshie Takahashi
Netherlands	Alice Janmaat, Marjan de Boer, Marischka Zegger
New Zealand	Janice Arnold, Brenda Ormsby, Debbie Smith
Norway	Elin Malde, Jannicke Nielsen, Cathrine Schröder
Singapore	Rosie Goh, Kee Bee Khim, Jeanette Sim
Spain	Carmen Maestre de Pellon, Mary Navarro, Maria Orueta
Sweden	Viveca Hoff, Liselotte Neumann, Anna Oxenstierna
Switzerland	Régine Lautens, Evelyn Orley, Jackie Orley
Thailand	Napasri Buranasiri, Rika Dila, Prasertsri Krupanich
United States	Heather Farr, Deb Richard, Jody Rosenthal
Venezuela	Yubiri Cortez, Maria Eugenia Larrazabal, Chela Quintana
West Germany	Ursula Beer, Martina Koch, Stephanie Lampert

== Results ==
Place	Country	Score	To par
1st place, gold medalist(s)	United States	145-153-141-146=585	+1
2nd place, silver medalist(s)	France	153-148-149-147=597	+13
3rd place, bronze medalist(s)	(United Kingdom) Great Britain & Ireland	149-155-149-147=600	+16
4	Japan	151-152-154-150=607	+23
5	Brazil	155-151-153-151=610	+26
6	Spain	147-154-162-149=612	+28
7	Sweden	152-161-148-153=614	+30
T8	Australia	154-152-157-154=617	+33
T8	New Zealand	161-156-146-154=617	+33
T8	West Germany	156-154-158-149=617	+33
11	Denmark	152-154-159-154=619	+35
12	Italy	157-154-162-147=620	+36
13	Switzerland	159-154-157-153=623	+39
14	Canada	157-153-158-159=627	+43
15	Venezuela	153-167-156-158=634	+50
16	Belgium	159-164-154-162=639	+55
17	Netherlands	161-162-164-162=649	+65
18	Thailand	168-165-162-160=655	+71
19	Norway	169-169-166-165=669	+85
20	Hong Kong	163-173-177-161=674	+90
T21	Indonesia	178-169-168-169=684	+100
T21	Singapore	174-170-171-169=684	+100

== Individual leaders ==
There was no official recognition for the lowest individual scores.

Place	Player	Country	Score	To par
1	Deb Richard	United States	75-75-70-75=295	+3
2	Heather Farr	United States	72-80-73-71=296	+4
T3	Jody Rosenthal	United States	73-78-71-76=298	+6
T3	Claire Waite	(United Kingdom) Great Britain & Ireland	72-78-73-75=298	+6
T5	Elizabeth Nickhorn	Brazil	75-75-75-75=300	+8
T5	Valérie Golléty-Pamard	France	76-73-76-75=300	+8
7	Penny Grice	(United Kingdom) Great Britain & Ireland	77-77-76-73=303	+11
T8	Mary Navarro	Spain	73-78-81-73=305	+13
T8	Lotta Schmidt	Denmark	74-75-79-77=305	+13
T9	Michiko Hattori	Japan	81-74-77-74=306	+14
T9	Cécilia Mourgue d'Algue	France	82-79-73-72=306	+14
T9	Chela Quintano	Venezuela	73-84-74-75=306	+14
