= 1978 U.S. Women's Open =

Coordinates: 39.807°N 86.305°W

Tournament information
- Dates: July 20–23, 1978
- Location: Indianapolis, Indiana
- Course: Country Club of Indianapolis
- Organized by: USGA
- Tour: LPGA Tour

Statistics
- Par: 71
- Length: 6,115 yards (5,592 m)
- Field: 150 players, 66 after cut
- Cut: 154 (+12)
- Prize fund: $100,000
- Winner's share: $15,000

Champion
- (United States) Hollis Stacy
- 289 (+5)

Location in the United States
Location in Indiana

The 1978 U.S. Women's Open was the 33rd U.S. Women's Open, held July 20–23 at Country Club of Indianapolis in Indianapolis, Indiana.

Defending champion Hollis Stacy won the second of her three U.S. Women's Open titles, one stroke ahead of runners-up JoAnne Carner and Sally Little. She sank a five-foot (1.5 m) putt for par on the 72nd green to secure the win, the second of her four major titles.

Rookie sensation Nancy Lopez was a co-leader after two rounds, but a 79 on Saturday took her out of contention, and she tied for ninth.

== Final leaderboard ==
Sunday, July 23, 1978

Place	Player	Score	To par	Money ($)
1	(United States) Hollis Stacy	70-75-72-72=289	+5	15,000
T2	(United States) JoAnne Carner	73-72-73-72=290	+6	7,000
T2	(South Africa) Sally Little	75-75-75-65=290	+6	7,000
T4	(United States) Jane Blalock	74-74-71-74=293	+9	4,650
T4	(United States) Pam Higgins	74-73-75-71=293	+9	4,650
T6	(United States) Donna Caponi Young	68-78-73-75=294	+10	3,260
T6	(United States) Donna White	72-72-79-71=294	+10	3,260
T6	(United States) Kathy Martin	76-74-71-73=294	+10	3,260
T9	(United States) Nancy Lopez	71-73-79-72=295	+11	$2,533
T9	(United States) Peggy Conley	75-76-70-74=295	+11	$2,533
T9	(Canada) Sandra Post	78-73-74-70=295	+11	$2,533
