= American Express Tour Player's Classic =

Tour Player's Classic
Tournament information
- Location: Tytherington, Cheshire, England
- Established: 1990
- Course: The Tytherington Club
- Par: 72
- Tour: Ladies European Tour
- Format: Stroke play
- Prize fund: £100,000
- Month played: May
- Final year: 1997

Final champion
- (Australia) Karen Lunn

The Tour Player's Classic was a women's professional golf tournament on the Ladies European Tour that took place in England. It was only held in 1990 and 1997 in Tytherington, Cheshire.

== Winners ==
Year	Winner	Score	Margin of victory	Runner(s)-up
American Express Tour Player's Classic
1997	(Australia) Karen Lunn	−5 (74-67-71-71=283)	1 stroke	(Germany) Tina Fischer (France) Patricia Meunier-Lebouc
WPG European Tour Classic
1990	(Spain) Tania Abitbol	−3 (213)	2 strokes	(Sweden) Anna Oxenstierna
