= Diane Barnard =

English professional golfer

Personal information
- Nickname: Di
- Nationality: England
- Born: 1964 (age 61–62) South Africa

Career
- Sport: Golf
- Turned professional: 1984
- Former tours: Ladies European Tour (1985–2006); LPGA Tour (1998–2000)
- Professional wins: 2

Number of wins by tour
- Ladies European Tour: 1
- Other: 1

Best results in LPGA major championships
- Women's PGA C'ship: T51: 1998
- U.S. Women's Open: CUT: 2000
- du Maurier Classic: T48: 1998
- Women's British Open: T56: 2001

Diane Barnard (born 1964) is an English professional golfer, broadcaster and golf executive, who played on the Ladies European Tour (LET) and LPGA Tour. She played on the LET between 1985 and 2006, where she won the 1990 BMW Ladies Classic and was runner-up at the 1991 Women's British Open.

== Career ==
Barnard was born in South Africa in May 1964. She turned professional in 1984 and joined the Ladies European Tour in 1985. Barnard won her maiden title at the 1990 BMW Ladies Classic in Düsseldorf, Germany, a stroke ahead of Australian Corinne Dibnah. In 1991, she was runner-up at the Bloor Homes Eastleigh Classic behind Dale Reid, and tied second with Helen Alfredsson in the Women's British Open at Woburn Golf and Country Club, three strokes behind Penny Grice-Whittaker.

In 1997, Barnard won the Lalla Meryem Cup in Morocco. She played on the LPGA Tour for three seasons between 1998 and 2000, with her best finish a tie for 18th at the 2000 Firstar LPGA Classic.

Barnard also functioned as a broadcaster and commentator for women's golf on Sky Sports. She served as Player Director and vice-chairman of the LET between 2003 and 2010. She was Tour Director of the LET Access Series from its inception in 2010, and became Director of Operations at the LET in 2019.

== Professional wins (2) ==
=== Ladies European Tour (1) ===
No.	Date	Tournament	Winning score	To par	Margin of victory	Runner-up
1	1 Jul 1991	BMW Ladies Classic	278	–8	1 stroke	(Australia) Corinne Dibnah

=== Other wins (1) ===
- 1997 Lalla Meryem Cup

== Results in LPGA majors ==
Tournament	1998	1999	2000	2001
LPGA Championship	T51	67		
U.S. Women's Open			CUT	
du Maurier Classic	T48	T59		
Women's British Open ^				T56

^ The Women's British Open replaced the du Maurier Classic as an LPGA major in 2001

Did not play

CUT = missed the half-way cut
