= Middlesbrough Municipal Ladies Classic =

Golf tournament on the Ladies European Tour

Tournament information
- Location: Middlesbrough, England
- Established: 1983
- Course: Middlesbrough Municipal GC
- Par: 72
- Tour: Ladies European Tour
- Format: Stroke play - 36 holes
- Prize fund: £4,000
- Month played: July
- Final year: 1983

Tournament record score
- Aggregate: 144 Beverly Lewis
- To par: E as above

Final champion
- (England) Beverly Lewis

Location map
- Location in England Location in North Yorkshire

The Middlesbrough Municipal Ladies Classic was a professional golf tournament in England on the Ladies European Tour.

The 36-hole event was held at the par-72 Middlesbrough Municipal Golf Club in Middlesbrough on 30–31 July 1983.

Beverly Lewis won the tournament two strokes ahead of Muriel Thomson and Mickey Walker, with Dale Reid of Scotland in 4th after she three-putted on the 2nd and 14th hole in the final round. Thomson held the overnight lead after an opening round of 72.

== Winners ==
| Year | Winner | Country | Winning score | To par | Margin of victory | Runners-up | Purse (£) | Winner's share (£) |
|---|---|---|---|---|---|---|---|---|
| 1983 | Beverly Lewis | England | 74-70=144 | E | 2 strokes | (Scotland) Muriel Thomson (England) Mickey Walker | 4,000 | 500 |
