= Florence Descampe =

Belgian professional golfer (born 1969)

Personal information
- Nationality: Belgium
- Born: 1 September 1969 (age 57)
- Spouse: Daniel van Dievoet (died 2011)

Career
- Sport: Golf
- Status: Professional
- Former tours: Ladies European Tour; LPGA Tour
- Professional wins: 7

Number of wins by tour
- LPGA Tour: 1
- Ladies European Tour: 6

Best results in LPGA major championships
- Chevron Championship: T49: 1993
- Women's PGA C'ship: CUT: 1992, 1993, 1994, 1995
- U.S. Women's Open: T45: 1993
- du Maurier Classic: T6: 1992
- Women's British Open: CUT: 2003

Florence Descampe (born 1 September 1969) is a Belgian professional golfer. She played on the United States–based LPGA Tour and the Ladies European Tour.

== Early life ==
She was born into the noble Descampe family.

== Career ==
Descampe had seven worldwide victories during her career including a win at the 1992 McCall's LPGA Classic on the LPGA Tour. Until Paula Creamer's win at the 2005 Evian Masters, she held the record as the LET's youngest winner after clinching the 1988 Danish Ladies Open.

Descampe was a member of the 1992 European Solheim Cup team.

== Personal life ==
In addition to being a member of the noble Descampe family, she is a member of the Van Dievoet family through her marriage with Daniel van Dievoet (1963–2011). She has three children: Élodie, a student-athlete golfer at the University of Michigan, Maxence, and Alban.

== Professional wins (7) ==
=== LPGA Tour wins (1) ===
No.	Date	Tournament	Winning score	Margin of victory	Runner-up
1	9 Aug 1992	McCall's LPGA Classic	–6 (73-69-69-67=278)	2 strokes	(United States) Dottie Mochrie

=== Ladies European Tour wins (6) ===
- 1988 (1) Danish Ladies Open
- 1990 (3) Valextra Classic, Italian Ladies' Open, Woolmark Ladies' Matchplay
- 1991 (1) Lufthansa Ladies' German Open
- 1994 (1) OVB Damen Open Austria

== Team appearances ==
Professional

- Solheim Cup (representing Europe): 1992 (winners)
