= Xonia Wunsch-Ruiz =

Spanish professional golfer

Xonia Wünsch
Personal information
- Full name: Xonia Wünsch-Ruiz
- Nationality: Spain
- Born: 5 June 1965 (age 61) Madrid, Spain

Career
- Sport: Golf
- Turned professional: 1987
- Former tour: Ladies European Tour
- Professional wins: 2

Number of wins by tour
- Ladies European Tour: 1
- Other: 1

Xonia Wünsch (born 5 June 1965) is a Spanish former professional golfer and Ladies European Tour player. In 1989, she won the Italian Ladies' Open and the Benson & Hedges Trophy with Miguel Ángel Jiménez.

== Golf career ==
Wünsch was born in Madrid in 1965 and reached the final of the 1984 French International Lady Juniors Amateur Championship and the 1987 Spanish International Ladies Amateur Championship.

She turned professional on 13 December 1987 and joined the Ladies European Tour. In 1989, she won the Italian Ladies' Open at Olgiata Golf Club in Rome and the Benson & Hedges Trophy with Miguel Ángel Jiménez at Aloha Golf Club in Puerto Banús, Spain.

In 2002, she became a golf commentator for Canal+.

Wünsch later regained her amateur status and competed in senior (50+) events. She won the 2020 Spanish International Senior Women's Championship at El Salar, and the 2021 European Senior Ladies' Team Championship with the Spanish team.

== Artist career ==
Wünsch received her first painting lessons from Luis de la Cámara when she was 9 years old, and won several youth prizes. After 2005 she concentrated on painting again.

== Amateur wins ==
- 2020 Spanish International Senior Ladies' Championship
- 2021 Campeonato de Espana Senior

== Professional wins (2) ==
=== Ladies European Tour (1) ===
- 1989 Italian Ladies' Open

=== Other wins (1) ===
- 1989 Benson & Hedges Trophy (with Miguel Ángel Jiménez)

== Team appearances ==
Amateur

- European Senior Ladies' Team Championship (representing Spain): 2021 (winners)
