= Benson & Hedges Trophy =

Tournament information
- Location: Spain
- Established: 1988
- Tour(s): European Tour; Ladies European Tour
- Format: Mixed pairs
- Month played: November
- Final year: 1991

Tournament record score
- Aggregate: 267 Cañizares & Abitbol (1990)

Final champion
- Anders Forsbrand & Helen Alfredsson

The Benson & Hedges Trophy was a professional golf tournament that was held in Spain from 1988 to 1991. It was a mixed pairs event that was an unofficial money event on both the European Tour and Ladies European Tour.

The tournament was held in November, after the conclusion of the main Order of Merit schedule, at a different venue each year.

== Winners ==
Year	Venue	Winner	Score	Margin of victory	Runner(s)-up	Ref
1991	Las Brisas GC	(Sweden) Anders Forsbrand & (Sweden) Helen Alfredsson	275 (−13)	2 strokes	(England) Malcolm MacKenzie & (England) Penny Grice-Whittaker (United States) Bryan Norton & (United States) Pearl Sinn	
1990	El Bosque G&CC	(Spain) José María Cañizares & (Spain) Tania Abitbol	267 (−21)	2 strokes	(Wales) Mark Mouland & (England) Alison Nicholas	
1989	Aloha GC	(Spain) Miguel Ángel Jiménez & (Spain) Xonia Wunsch-Ruiz	281 (−7)	2 strokes	(England) Carl Mason & (Scotland) Gillian Stewart	
1988	La Moraleja	(Zimbabwe) Mark McNulty & (France) Marie-Laure Taya	276 (−12)	1 stroke	(Spain) José María Cañizares & (Spain) Tania Abitbol	
