= Laurette Maritz =

South African professional golfer

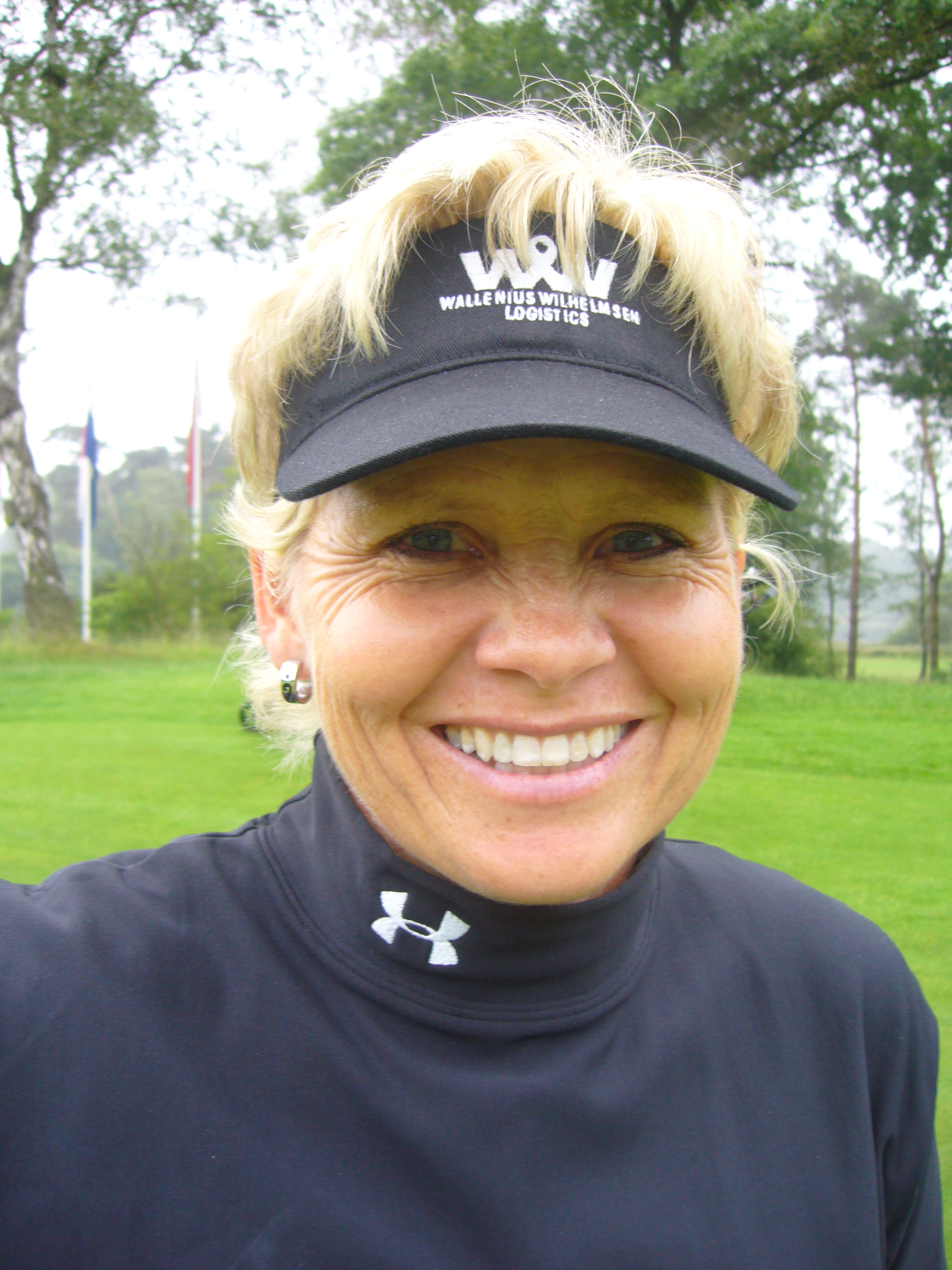

Personal information
- Nationality: South Africa
- Born: 13 January 1964 (age 62) Johannesburg, Gauteng, South Africa
- Height: 1.65 m (5 ft 5 in)

Career
- Sport: Golf
- College: United States International University
- Turned professional: 1987
- Former tours: Ladies European Tour; Ladies African Tour
- Professional wins: 10

Number of wins by tour
- Ladies European Tour: 3
- Other: 7

Best results in LPGA major championships
- Women's British Open: T60: 2001

Achievements and awards
- LET Rookie of the Year: 1988
- US Amateur Player of the Year: 1987
- All American Award: 1983–1987
- Nedbank Women's Golf Tour Order of Merit: 2006

Laurette Maritz (born 13 January 1964) is a South African professional golfer. She won three titles on the Ladies European Tour between 1988 and 1990, and was LET Rookie of the Year in 1988.

== Early life and amateur career ==
Maritz grew up in Johannesburg and started playing golf when she was 11. Consumed by the sport, she quit high school after the 11th grade. Playing on the South African National Team, she won tournaments in Europe, and she was thinking about turning professional. After meeting LPGA Tour player Sally Little in 1983 she accepted a golf scholarship to United States International University in San Diego, where she earned All-American honors four times and a BA in Physical Education. She was a 1987 Honda Sports Award nominee.

== Professional career ==
Maritz turned professional after graduating in 1987 and joined the Ladies European Tour in 1988. She enjoyed immediate success, and won the season opener, the Marbella Ladies Open, 3 strokes before Dale Reid and Corinne Dibnah. She also won the EMS Masters in Portugal in her third start, to capture the LET Rookie of the Year title.

She was runner-up at the TEC Players Championship at Patshull Park G&CC in England both in 1989 and 1990. In 1990 she won her third title, the Laing Ladies Charity Classic at Stoke Poges in England, and was runner-up in the Ladies German Open at Wörthsee Golf Club in Bavaria.

Maritz also recorded runner-up finishes at the 1991 Spanish Classic and the 2013 Ladies Norwegian Challenge. She also emerged as runner-up to Karen Lunn at the Open de France Dames in 1997. In 2007, she tied for 3rd at the Northern Ireland Ladies Open. Maritz represented South Africa at the Women's World Cup of Golf each year from 2005 to 2008.

In addition to the LET, Maritz played on the South African tour, where she won several tournaments including the South African Women's Open, South African Ladies Masters, Pam Golding Ladies International and Telkom Women's Classic.

== Professional wins (10) ==
=== Ladies European Tour wins (3) ===
No.	Date	Tournament	Winning score	Margin of victory	Runner(s)-up
1	17 Apr 1988	Marbella Ladies Open	283 (−3)	3 strokes	(Scotland) Dale Reid (Australia) Corinne Dibnah
2	7 May 1988	EMS Masters	213 (E)	3 strokes	(Spain) Tania Abitbol (Australia) Karen Lunn (England) Alison Nicholas (Sweden) Marie Wennersten-From
3	8 Jul 1990	Laing Ladies Charity Classic	275 (−13)	Playoff	(England) Alison Nicholas

=== Ladies African Tour wins (7) ===
No.	Date	Tournament	Winning score	Margin of victory	Runner-up
1	1989	South African Women's Open			
2	1996	South African Women's Open			
3	1998	South African Ladies Masters			
4	2003	Pam Golding Ladies International	–7 (209)	3 strokes	(Germany) Elisabeth Esterl
5	2003	Nedbank Women's SA Masters			
6	2005	Telkom Women's Classic	–7 (71-70-68=209)	2 strokes	(Sweden) Antonella Cvitan
7	2006	Telkom Women's Classic	–9 (73-66-68=207)	1 stroke	(England) Rebecca Hudson

== Results in LPGA majors ==
Maritz only played in the Women's British Open.

Tournament	2001	2002	2003	2004	2005	2006
Women's British Open	T60	CUT	CUT	T66		CUT

Did not play

CUT = missed the half-way cut
"T" = tied

== Team appearances ==
Amateur

- Espirito Santo Trophy (representing South Africa): 1982

Professional

- Praia d'El Rey European Cup (representing the Ladies European Tour): 1997
- World Cup (representing South Africa): 2005, 2006, 2007, 2008
