= Penny Grice-Whittaker =

English golfer and singer

Penny B. Grice-Whittaker
Personal information
- Nationality: England
- Born: 11 October 1964 (age 62) Sheffield, England

Career
- Sport: Golf
- Turned professional: 1985
- Former tour: Ladies European Tour
- Professional wins: 4

Number of wins by tour
- Ladies European Tour: 3
- WPGA Tour of Australasia: 1

Penny B. Grice-Whittaker (née Grice, 11 October 1964) is a former English golfer turned singer. As an amateur golfer, Grice-Whittaker won multiple events in England and was a bronze medalist for the Great Britain and Ireland team at the 1984 Espirito Santo Trophy. She also participated at the Curtis Cup that year for Great Britain before turning professional in 1985. As a professional golfer, Grice-Whittaker won her first Ladies European Tour event at the 1986 Belgian Ladies Godiva Open. She later won additional LET events in 1991 at the Weetabix Women's British Open and Longines Classic. On the Australian Ladies Professional Golf Tour, Grice-Whittaker won the 1992 Hisiki Ladies Queensland Open. After retiring from golf in 1998, Grice-Whittaker became a member of the female musical duo Bits-n-Pieces in the early 2000s.

== Early life ==
In 1964, Grice-Whittaker was born in Sheffield, England. She began to play golf when she was thirteen.

== Amateur career ==
Grice-Whittaker began her amateur career as a runner-up at the 1981 Girls Amateur Championship. As an amateur, Grice-Whittaker won her first amateur events in Yorkshire between 1981 and 1983. At events held by England Golf, Grice-Whittaker won the 1983 English Girls' Open Championship and the 1984 English Women's Strokeplay. In amateur team events held in 1984, Grice-Whittaker was a participant at the Curtis Cup and a bronze medalist at the Espirito Santo Trophy for the Great Britain and Ireland team.

== Professional career ==
After turning professional in 1985, Grice-Whittaker played on the Ladies European Tour. Her first win was at the 1986 Belgian Ladies Open with a course record of seventeen under par. During the 1990s, additional European wins for Grice-Whittaker came at the 1991 Women's British Open and the 1991 Longines Classic. Outside of the LET, Grice-Whittaker won the 1992 Hisiki Ladies Queensland Open on the Australian Ladies Professional Golf Tour.

== Private life ==
In 1998, Grice-Whittaker ended her golf career to become a singer. In the early 2000s, she started singing as a member of the female musical duo Bits-n-Pieces.

On 8 October 2021, Grice-Whittaker appeared on The Chase. Chaser Paul Sinha remarked that she was the first person he'd faced on the show with a bigger Wikipedia entry than he had - aside from the Celebrity edition.

== Professional wins (4) ==
=== Ladies European Tour wins (3) ===
- 1986 Belgian Ladies Godiva Open
- 1991 Weetabix Women's British Open, Longines Classic

=== ALPG Tour wins (1) ===
- 1992 Hisiki Ladies Queensland Open

== Team appearances ==
Amateur

- European Lady Junior's Team Championship (representing England): 1982, 1983 (winners), 1984, 1986
- Curtis Cup (representing Great Britain & Ireland): 1984
- Espirito Santo Trophy (representing Great Britain and Ireland): 1984
- European Ladies' Team Championship (representing England): 1983
- Women's Home Internationals (representing England): 1983, 1984 (winners)
