= British Women's Matchplay =

Professional golf tournament

British Women's Matchplay Championship
Tournament information
- Location: England (1979–1987); Spain (1988–1990); Italy (1991)
- Established: 1979
- Course(s): Moor Park GC (1979–81; 1987)
- Tour(s): Ladies European Tour
- Format: Matchplay
- Final year: 1991

Final champion
- (Italy) Federica Dassù

The British Women's Matchplay was a women's professional golf tournament on the Ladies European Tour.

The tournament was initially held in England between 1979 and 1987. In 1988, the tournament moved to Spain, and the final installment in 1991 was held near Milan, Italy.

Home player Mickey Walker won the tournament twice.

== Winners ==
Year	Venue	Winner	Country	Score	Runner-up	Winner's share (£)
Woolmark Ladies' Matchplay Championship
1991	Carimate GC, Italy	Federica Dassù	Italy	5 & 4	(Scotland) Dale Reid	12,000
1990	Club de Campo Villa de Madrid	Florence Descampe	Belgium	2 & 1	(Scotland) Dale Reid	12,000
1989	Barcelona GC, Spain	Dennise Hutton	Australia	2 up	(Northern Ireland) Maureen Madill	12,000
1988	Vallromanes GC, Spain	Marie-Laure de Taya	France	4 & 2	(England) Alison Nicholas	10,000
1987	Moor Park GC, Hertfordshire	Trish Johnson	England	4 & 2	(France) Marie-Laure de Taya	6,000
British Women's Matchplay Championship
1986	No tournament					
415/Vantage WPGA Matchplay Championship
1985	Bramhall GC, Manchester	Jane Connachan	Scotland	1 up	(England) Debbie Dowling	2,000
Lorne Stewart Matchplay Championship
1984	Sudbury GC, London	Mickey Walker	England	2 & 1	(Scotland) Jane Connachan	2,000
British Women's Matchplay Championship
1983	No tournament					
1982	Cancelled					
Lambert & Butler British Women's Matchplay Championship
1981	Moor Park GC, Hertfordshire	Jenny Lee Smith	England	3 & 2	(England) Beverly Lewis	3,000
1980	Moor Park GC, Hertfordshire	Mickey Walker	England	3 & 1	(Sweden) Kärstin Ehrnlund	2,000
1979	Moor Park GC, Hertfordshire	Jane Panter	England	2 up	(Scotland) Muriel Thomson	2,000

== See also ==
- British PGA Matchplay Championship
