= Karen Lunn =

Australian golfer

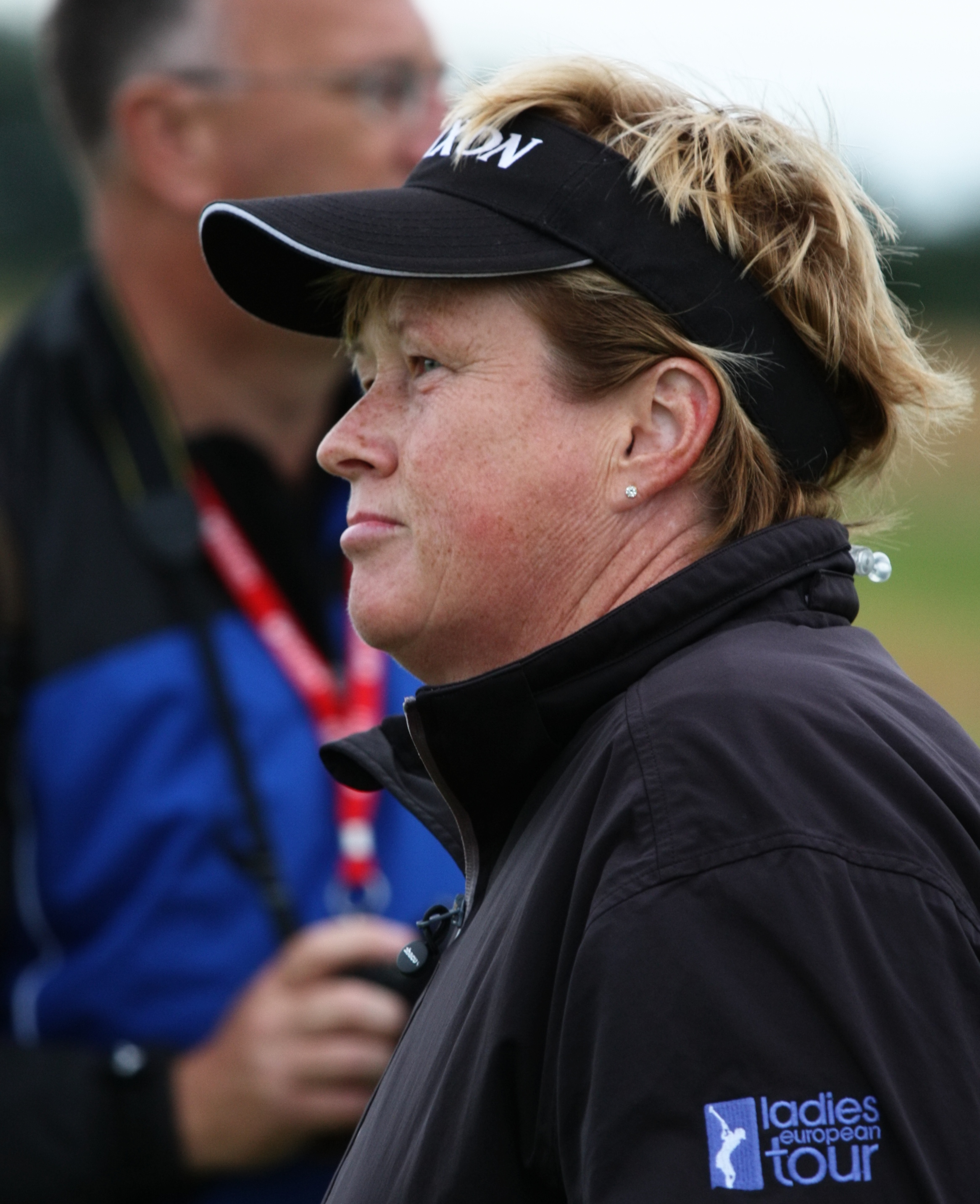
- Lunn at the 2009 Women's British Open

Personal information
- Full name: Karen Marie Lunn
- Nationality: Australia
- Born: 21 March 1966 (age 60) Sydney, Australia
- Height: 1.68 m (5 ft 6 in)

Career
- Sport: Golf
- Turned professional: 1985
- Current tours: Ladies European Tour; ALPG Tour
- Former tour: LPGA Tour (1993-1999)
- Professional wins: 16

Number of wins by tour
- Ladies European Tour: 10
- Ladies Asian Golf Tour: 1
- WPGA Tour of Australasia: 4
- Other: 1

Best results in LPGA major championships
- Women's PGA C'ship: 71st: 1999
- U.S. Women's Open: T29: 1994
- du Maurier Classic: T22: 1994
- Women's British Open: T40: 2002

Achievements and awards
- Ladies European Tour Order of Merit: 1993

Karen Marie Lunn (born 21 March 1966) is an Australian professional golfer.

== Career ==
In 1966, she was born in Sydney, Australia.

In 1985, Lunn turned professional. She has spent much of her career on the Ladies European Tour, where she has won several tournaments including a Women's British Open title in 1993 (before that tournament was an LPGA major championship). She won the Order of Merit that year.

In 2004, Lunn was named the Ladies European Tour's Chairman of the Board.

She now lives in Tweed Heads, Australia.

== Awards and honors ==
In 1993, she won the Order of Merit on the Ladies European Tour.

== Professional wins (16) ==
=== Ladies European Tour wins (10) ===
- 1986 Borlänge Ladies Open
- 1988 Godiva European Masters
- 1990 BMW European Masters
- 1992 Slovenian Ladies Open
- 1993 KRP World Ladies Classic, Weetabix Women's British Open
- 1997 American Express Tour Player's Classic, Open de France Dames
- 2010 Portugal Ladies Open
- 2012 Lalla Meryem Cup

=== ALPG Tour wins (4) ===
- 1990 Daikyo Ladies Challenge Series 2
- 2004 Eden Country Club Pro-Am
- 2008 Peugeot Kangaroo Valley ALPG Classic
- 2012 ActewAGL Royal Canberra Ladies Classic

=== Ladies Asia Golf Circuit wins (1) ===
- 1988 Thailand Ladies Open

=== Other wins (1) ===
- 1992 Malaysian Open
