= Tania Abitbol =

Spanish professional golfer (born 1965)

Personal information
- Nationality: Spain
- Born: 21 January 1965 (age 61) Madrid, Spain

Career
- Sport: Golf
- Former tours: Ladies European Tour; LPGA Tour
- Professional wins: 4

Number of wins by tour
- Ladies European Tour: 2
- Ladies Asian Golf Tour: 1
- Other: 1

Best results in LPGA major championships
- U.S. Women's Open: T4: 1994

Tania Abitbol (born 21 January 1965) is a professional golfer from Spain, who competed on the Ladies European Tour and LPGA Tour.

== Career ==
As an amateur, Abitol won the 1985 Portuguese International Ladies Amateur Championship. She competed internationally on the Spanish National Team, and finish 3rd at the 1987 European Ladies' Team Championship.

On the Ladies European Tour, she won the 1989 Danish Ladies Open and the 1990 WPG European Tour Classic. She was runner-up at the 1991 Valextra Classic and the 1992 Ladies English Open, both times beaten by Laura Davies. She also won the 1990 Benson & Hedges Trophy with José María Cañizares, a mixed pairs event that was an unofficial money event on both the European Tour and Ladies European Tour.

On the LPGA Tour, Abitbol earned a total of $140,000 in 49 starts. She finished fourth at the 1994 U.S. Women's Open and was in second place after the first round of the 1995 U.S. Women's Open, but finished outside the top-10.

In 1995, she was the LPGA Tour's longest driver, averaging about 267 yards, slightly longer than Laura Davies, at 265 yards.

== Amateur wins ==
- 1985 Portuguese International Ladies Amateur Championship

== Professional wins (4) ==
=== Ladies European Tour wins (2) ===
- 1989 Danish Ladies Open
- 1990 WPG European Tour Classic

=== Ladies Asian Golf Tour wins (1) ===
- 1992 Singapore Ladies Open

=== Other wins (1) ===
- 1990 Benson & Hedges Trophy (with José María Cañizares)

== Team appearances ==
Amateur

- European Lady Junior's Team Championship (representing Spain): 1986
- European Ladies' Team Championship (representing Spain): 1987
