= Peggy Conley =

American professional golfer (born (1947)

Personal information
- Nationality: United States
- Born: 1947 (age 78–79) Spokane, Washington, U.S.

Career
- Sport: Golf
- College: University of Washington
- Turned professional: 1976
- Former tours: LPGA Tour (joined 1976); Ladies European Tour
- Professional wins: 2

Number of wins by tour
- Ladies European Tour: 2

Best results in LPGA major championships
- Women's PGA C'ship: T6: 1979
- U.S. Women's Open: T9: 1978
- du Maurier Classic: T59: 1980

Achievements and awards
- PNGA Hall of Fame: 2001

Peggy Conley (born 1947) is a retired American professional golfer.

== Career ==
At just 16, Conley played her way into the championship match of the 1963 U.S. Women's Amateur and lost 2 and 1 to Seattle's Anne Quast. In 1964, she won the U.S. Girls' Junior title after losing the final match the year before, beating Laura MacIvor, 6 and 5. In 1966, she captured the Women's Western Amateur. Conley became the first woman to receive a University of Washington golf scholarship.

At 29, she qualified for the LPGA Tour, where she recorded top-10 finishes at the 1978 U.S. Women's Open and the 1979 LPGA Championship. Losing her card after six seasons, she turned to the Ladies European Tour (LET), where she played another half-dozen seasons.

She won twice on the LET, the 1984 Ulster Volkswagen Classic and the 1988 Portuguese Ladies Open, and finished runner-up multiple times, including at the 1986 Women's British Open.

A head-on collision in Italy ended her professional career in 1991. She was inducted into the Pacific Northwest Golf Association Hall of Fame in 2001.

== Amateur wins ==
- 1961 PNGA Junior Girls
- 1963 PNGA Junior Girls, Oregon Junior Girls
- 1964 PNGA Junior Girls, Oregon Junior Girls, U.S. Girls' Junior
- 1966 Women's Western Amateur
- 1972 PNGA Women's Amateur Champion

== Professional wins (2) ==
=== Ladies European Tour wins (2) ===
- 1984 Ulster Volkswagen Classic
- 1988 Portuguese Ladies Open

== U.S. national team appearances ==
Amateur

- Curtis Cup: 1964 (winners), 1968 (winners)
