= Beverly Lewis (golfer) =

English professional golfer, author, broadcaster

- Born: 1947; Essex, United Kingdom
- Died: 2019 (aged 71–72); England
- Occupations: Professional golfer, coach, author, broadcaster
- Known for: First female captain of the PGA (UK), founder member of Women's PGA (LET)
- Spouse: Ken Lewis

Beverly Lewis (1947–2019) was a British professional golfer, author, and broadcaster. She was a founding member of the Women's Professional Golf Association (WPGA), later the Ladies European Tour (LET), and became the first female captain of the Professional Golfers' Association (PGA) in the United Kingdom.

== Early life and education ==
Lewis was born in Essex, England, in 1947. She took up golf at the age of 18, learning the game on a local pitch and putt course. Within four years, she became the Essex Ladies Amateur Champion and joined Thorndon Park Golf Club, where she remained a lifelong member.

== Career ==
Lewis turned professional in 1978 and became a founder member of the Women's PGA, later the LET. She chaired the Women's PGA between 1979 and 1981, and again in 1986. She played on the WPGA tour for eight years, winning two tournaments. In 1982, she became one of the first women to attain PGA membership and was one of just two women to achieve PGA Master Professional status.

After her playing career, Lewis focused on coaching, working with the English Ladies’ Golf Association, county teams, and players of all abilities. She served as a PGA Professional at several Essex clubs, including JJB Golf Centre (Romford), Langdon Hills Golf Club (Bulphan), Garon Park Golf Complex (Southend-on-Sea), and Brentwood Park Golf Club (Brentwood). She was also a lecturer and a qualified R&A referee.

Lewis was a regular contributor to Golf World magazine in the UK and served as the only woman on their teaching panel for six years. She authored or co-authored at least ten books on golf, including instructional series and Improve Your Golf. She also worked as a broadcaster, providing commentary for the BBC, Channel 7 (Australia), and ESPN.

In 2005, Lewis became the first female captain in the 104-year history of the PGA (UK), representing the Association at major golf events including The Open and the US Masters.

The Beverly Lewis Trophy, awarded to the foremost female PGA Assistant of the Year, is named in her honour.

== Personal life ==
Lewis was married to Ken Lewis, an artist and collaborator on her published works. Her interests included music and playing the organ. She died in 2019 at the age of 71 from leukaemia.

== Professional wins (2) ==
=== Ladies European Tour wins (2) ===
- 1981 Volvo International Tournament
- 1983 Middlesbrough Municipal Ladies Classic

== Selected bibliography ==
- Shots For Lower Scoring (1988)
- Play Better Golf (1990)
- Power Driving: Swing on the Right Track (1988)
- Golf For Women (1990)
- How to Break 90: The Mental and Tactical Approach
- Winning Golf for Women
- Curing Hooks and Slices: Straighten the Curving Shots
- Golf Clinic Play Better Golf (1998)
- Cómo jugar al golf (2002)
- Curing Common Faults: Remedy Those Costly Shots
