= Carolina Melgrati =

Italian professional golfer (born c.2002)

Personal information
- Nationality: Italy
- Born: 15 August 2002 (age 24) Milan, Italy
- Height: 5 ft 1 in (155 cm)

Career
- Sport: Golf
- College: University of Arizona
- Turned professional: 2025
- Current tour: LPGA Tour (joined 2026)

Best results in LPGA major championships
- Chevron Championship: DNP
- Women's PGA C'ship: T32: 2026
- U.S. Women's Open: DNP
- Women's British Open: DNP
- Evian Championship: DNP

Carolina Melgrati (born 2002 August 15) is an Italian professional golfer and LPGA Tour player. In 2022 as an amateur, she tied 4th at the Ladies Italian Open and led the Scandinavian Mixed.

== Amateur career ==
Melgrati was born in Milan and had a successful amateur career. In 2020, she won the Italian Ladies Match Play Championship and the Italian Ladies U18 Championship, and was stroke-play qualifying co-medalist at The Women's Amateur Championship. In 2021, she was runner-up at the Italian International Ladies Amateur Championship two strokes behind Charlotte Liautier, and top-6 at both the Spanish International Ladies Amateur Championship and Portuguese International Ladies Amateur Championship. She finished top-10 at the European Ladies Amateur in 2022 and 2023.

Melgrati represented Italy at the European Girls' Team Championship twice, capturing the bronze in 2020. She appeared at the European Ladies' Team Championship four times, winning the bronze in 2021 and the silver in 2022, together with Alessandra Fanali, Benedetta Moresco, Alessia Nobilio, Emilie Alba Paltrinieri and Anna Zanusso. With Moresco and Nobilo she secured the bronze at the 2019 World Junior Girls Championship in Canada. She also represented Europe at the 2025 Patsy Hankins Trophy.

Melgrati attended the University of Arizona from 2021 to 2025 and played for the Arizona Wildcats women's golf team, where she was WGCA Honorable Mention All-American and Pac-12 All-Conference Team Selection. She appeared at the Augusta National Women's Amateur three times.

In 2021, Melgrati finished tied for 10th at the Ladies Italian Open. In 2022, she finished tied 4th at the Ladies Italian Open before shooting an opening round 65 (−7) to share the overnight lead at the Scandinavian Mixed, a European Tour and Ladies European Tour joint event. She was tied for second after 36 holes, and ultimately finished tied 20th.

== Professional career ==
Melgrati turned professional in 2025 and secured her card for the 2026 LPGA Tour at Q-Series. In her rookie season, she recorded her first top-10 finish at the Riviera Maya Open, where she tied for 9th, 12 strokes behind winner Nelly Korda.

== Amateur wins ==
- 2020 Italian Ladies Match Play Championship – Giuseppe Silva Trophy, Italian Ladies U18 Championship – Trofeo Silvio Marazza

== Team appearances ==
Amateur

- World Junior Girls Championship (representing Italy): 2019
- European Girls' Team Championship (representing Italy): 2019, 2020
- European Ladies' Team Championship (representing Italy): 2021, 2022, 2024, 2025
- Espirito Santo Trophy (representing Europe): 2022
- Patsy Hankins Trophy (representing Europe): 2025
