= Anna Zanusso =

Italian professional golfer (born 2000)

Personal information
- Nickname: Z
- Nationality: Italy
- Born: 25 April 2000 (age 26) Castelfranco Veneto, Italy
- Height: 5 ft 8 in (1.73 m)

Career
- Sport: Golf
- College: University of Denver
- Turned professional: 2024
- Current tour: Ladies European Tour (joined 2025)

Best results in LPGA major championships
- Chevron Championship: DNP
- Women's PGA C'ship: DNP
- U.S. Women's Open: DNP
- Women's British Open: CUT: 2026
- Evian Championship: DNP

Achievements and awards
- Summit League Golfer of the Year: 2022, 2023, 2024
Medal record
Representing Italy
World University Golf Championships
Gold medal – first place	2024 Seinäjoki	Individual
Silver medal – second place	2024 Seinäjoki	Team

Anna Zanusso (born 25 April 2000) is an Italian professional golfer who plays on the Ladies European Tour. As an amateur, she won the 2018 European Girls' Team Championship, the 2018 Annika Invitational Europe, and the 2024 World University Golf Championship.

== Amateur career ==
In 2018, Zanusso won several individual titles in Italy including the Internazionali d'Italia Femminili U18, and the Annika Invitational Europe in Sweden, three strokes ahead of Ingrid Lindblad.

She played for the national team and won the 2018 European Girls' Team Championship at Forsgården Golf Club in Sweden, alongside Alessia Nobilio, Virginia Bossi, Emilie Alba Paltrinieri, Benedetta Moresco and Caterina Don. She appeared six times for Italy at the European Ladies' Team Championship between 2019 and 2024, where their best result was a runner-up finish in 2022 at Conwy Golf Club in Wales, where they lost the final to England.

Zanusso attended the University of Denver between 2019 and 2024, majoring in international business. She played with the Denver Pioneers women's golf team and won the 2019 Golfweek Conference Challenge, the 2020 Westbrook Invitational, and the 2022 Summit League Women's Championship. At the Westbrook Invitational, she shot a 61 to tie the NCAA 18-hole record. She was named 2024 Summit League Golfer of the Year.

Zanusso won her last amateur event, the 2024 World University Championships, and finished runner-up with Italy in the team competition.

== Professional career ==
Zanusso turned professional in 2024. She finished 14th at Q-School to earn her card for the 2025 Ladies European Tour, alongside her compatriot Alessia Nobilio.

Zanusso made 20 starts in her rookie LET season and finished top-25 five times. In 2026, she recorded top-4 finishes at the MCB Ladies Classic – Mauritius, Lalla Meryem Cup and Czech Ladies Open.

== Amateur wins ==
- 2016 Trofeo Glauco Lolli Ghetti
- 2018 Gara Citta di Castelfranco, Leone Di San Marco, Annika Invitational Europe, Internazionali d'Italia Femminili U18
- 2019 Golfweek Conference Challenge
- 2020 Westbrook Invitational
- 2022 Summit League Women's Championship
- 2024 World University Golf Championship

== Team appearances ==
Amateur

- European Girls' Team Championship (representing Italy): 2018 (winners)
- European Ladies' Team Championship (representing Italy): 2019, 2020, 2021, 2022, 2023, 2024
