= 2026 Sunshine Ladies Tour =

12th season of the Sunshine Ladies Tour

2026 Sunshine Ladies Tour season
- Duration: 4 February 2026 – 3 May 2026
- Number of official events: 9
- Order of Merit Winner: (South Africa) Casandra Alexander
- Rookie of the Year: (South Africa) Caitlyn Macnab

The 2026 Sunshine Ladies Tour was the 13th season of the Sunshine Ladies Tour, a series of professional golf tournaments for women based in South Africa.

== Schedule ==
The season consisted of 9 official events, all except one held in South Africa, played between February and May.

The first 8 events were unchanged from the previous season, and the schedule grew with the addition of a co-sanctioned tournament in Mauritius.

Date	Tournament	Venue	Winner	Purse (ZAR)	Notes
6 Feb	SuperSport Ladies Challenge	Humewood Golf Club, Gqeberha	(Germany) Celina Sattelkau	1,300,000	
15 Feb	NTT Data Ladies Pro-Am	Fancourt Country Club, George	(Germany) Celina Sattelkau	2,500,000	Pro-Am
7 Mar	Standard Bank Ladies Open	Durbanville Golf Club, Cape Town	(South Africa) Danielle du Toit	1,000,000	
13 Mar	Jabra Ladies Classic	Glendower Golf Club, Johannesburg	(France) Lois Lau	1,000,000	
20 Mar	Platinum Ladies Open	Blair Atholl Golf, Johannesburg	(South Africa) Gabrielle Venter	1,200,000	
28 Mar	ABSA Ladies Invitational	Royal Johannesburg & Kensington Golf Club	(South Africa) Nadia van der Westhuizen	1,500,000	
19 Apr	Joburg Ladies Open	Randpark Golf Club, Johannesburg	(France) Agathe Laisné	€330 000	Co-sanctioned with the LET
26 Apr	Investec South African Women's Open	Royal Cape Golf Club, Cape Town	(England) Esme Hamilton	€350 000	Co-sanctioned with the LET
3 May	MCB Ladies Classic – Mauritius	Constance Belle Mare Plage, Mauritius	(Denmark) Smilla Tarning Sønderby	€400 000	Co-sanctioned with the LET

== Order of Merit ==
This shows the leaders in the final Order of Merit:

Rank	Player	Points
1	(South Africa) Casandra Alexander	1,731
2	(Germany) Celina Sattelkau	1,629
3	(Germany) Sophie Witt	798
4	(South Africa) Danielle du Toit	664
5	(South Africa) Gabrielle Venter	638
