= Alessandra Fanali =

Italian professional golfer

Personal information
- Nickname: Ale
- Nationality: Italy
- Born: 30 July 1999 (age 27) Fiuggi, Lazio, Italy
- Height: 5 ft 9 in (175 cm)

Career
- Sport: Golf
- College: Arizona State University
- Turned professional: 2022
- Current tour: Ladies European Tour (joined 2023)

Best results in LPGA major championships
- Chevron Championship: DNP
- Women's PGA C'ship: DNP
- U.S. Women's Open: DNP
- Women's British Open: CUT: 2025
- Evian Championship: DNP

Alessandra Fanali (born 30 July 1999) is an Italian professional golfer who plays on the Ladies European Tour. She was runner-up at the 2022 Ladies Italian Open and 2024 Magical Kenya Ladies Open.

== Amateur career ==
Fanali is from Fiuggi, Lazio near Rome and represents Marco Simone Golf and Country Club after she started playing at Fiuggi Golf Club. She joined the Italian National Team and won the 2016 European Girls' Team Championship in Oslo together with Caterina Don, Alessia Nobilio and Emilie Alba Paltrinieri, beating a Swedish team with Maja Stark, Linn Grant and Frida Kinhult in the final.

In 2017, she represented Europe in the Junior Solheim Cup alongside Linn Grant, Maja Stark, Julia Engström, Frida Kinhult, Emma Spitz and Esther Henseleit. In 2018, she lost a playoff at the Italian International Ladies Amateur Championship to Emma Spitz of Austria.

Fanali appeared four times for Italy in the European Ladies' Team Championship, finishing 4th in 2018 after they lost their semi-final to Sweden, securing the bronze against Germany in 2019, and losing the final in 2022 to England.

Fanali played college golf at Arizona State University with the Arizona State Sun Devils women's golf team 2018–22 alongside Linn Grant and Alexandra Försterling. She was named All-American and recorded one individual title.

In 2019, she made a hole-in-one at the Annika Intercollegiate, and played in the inaugural Augusta National Women's Amateur.

Fanali shot a 67 in the final round of the 2022 Ladies Italian Open at Margara Golf Club to join a playoff with Morgane Métraux and Meghan MacLaren. She birdied the first playoff hole but Métraux sank a 20-foot putt for eagle to win.

== Professional career ==
Fanali turned professional in 2022 and secured her card for the 2023 Ladies European Tour by birdying her final hole at Q-School, a lost ball in a palm tree earlier in the round having cost her two strokes.

She started her rookie season well, with top-10 finishes at the Lalla Meryem Cup and the South African Women's Open and recorded a hand-full of top-10 finishes across the season, including a tie for 4th at the Jabra Ladies Open at Evian Resort Golf Club.

She was on the winning team at the 2023 Aramco Team Series – Riyadh alongside Carlota Ciganda and Sára Kousková.

In 2024, Fanali was runner-up in the season opener Magical Kenya Ladies Open behind Shannon Tan, having started the day as joint leaders.

== Amateur wins ==
- 2016 Coppa d'Oro Citta di Roma, Quercia d'Oro, Castello di Marco Simone Trophy
- 2017 Castello di Marco Simone Trophy
- 2022 Silverado Showdown

== Playoff record ==
Ladies European Tour (0–1)

No.	Year	Tournament	Opponent(s)	Result
1	2022	Ladies Italian Open	(Switzerland) Morgane Métraux (England) Meghan MacLaren	Métraux won with eagle on first extra hole

== Results in LPGA majors ==
Tournament	2025
Chevron Championship	
U.S. Women's Open	
Women's PGA Championship	
The Evian Championship	
Women's British Open	CUT

Did not play

CUT = missed the half-way cut

== Team appearances ==
Amateur

- Junior Solheim Cup (representing Europe): 2017
- World Junior Girls Championship (representing Italy): 2017
- European Girls' Team Championship (representing Italy): 2016 (winners), 2017
- European Ladies' Team Championship (representing Italy): 2018, 2019, 2020, 2022
