= Isabella Holpfer =

Austrian professional golfer (born 2001)

Personal information
- Nickname: Isi
- Nationality: Austria
- Born: 6 January 2001 (age 25) Vienna, Austria
- Height: 5 ft 7 in (1.70 m)

Career
- Sport: Golf
- College: University of Georgia
- Turned professional: 2024
- Current tour: LET Access Series (joined 2025)

Achievements and awards
- Marilyn Vincent Award: 2024

Isabella Holpfer (born 6 January 2001) is an Austrian professional golfer. As an amateur, she won the Junior Vagliano Trophy in 2015 and 2017, and was a finalist in The R&A's Girls Amateur Championship in 2018 and 2019.

== Amateur career ==
Holpfer was born in Vienna in 2001 to an Austrian father and a mother from Minnesota. She began competing in golf at a young age, and in 2009 in participated in the Austrian "Schüler Golf Cup U10" tournaments, eventually winning 21 events in her age group. Between 2010 and 2013 she also participated in the U.S. KidsGolf World Championship in Pinehurst, North Carolina.

Holpfer joined the Austrian National Team and represented her country at the 2014, 2015, 2016 and 2017 European Girls' Team Championships and at the 2019 and 2021 European Ladies' Team Championship. The top performance came in 2015 where she helped Austria earn a bronze medal at Golf Resort Kaskada in Kurin, Czech Republic. She helped Europe capture the Junior Vagliano Trophy in both 2015 and again in 2017, where she posted a perfect 4–0 record to help the Europeans defeat Great Britain and Ireland by 15–3.

She also excelled individually. Holpfer won the 2014 Austrian Match Play Championship at Salzkammergut Golf Club as a 13-year-old, the event's youngest winner ever. She recorded multiple international victories, including at the 2015 Irish Women's Open Stroke Play Championship, where she posted a par on the first extra hole in a sudden-death playoff with Chloe Ryan at Dún Laoghaire Golf Club to secure the title, after both golfers finished the 54-hole event at 221.

In 2018, Holpfer shot a 1-under 287 to capture the Slovenian Ladies Amateur in Livada, holding off Pia Babnik of Slovenia and fellow Austrian Emma Spitz by one stroke. Holpfer also notched additional top-10 finishes at the French International Lady Juniors Amateur Championship (5th), the Spanish Ladies Amateur (5th) and the Portuguese Ladies Amateur (8th). She wrapped up the 2018 season with a dominating 11-stroke win at the English Women's Strokeplay at Coventry Golf Club, where she led wire-to-wire after posting a 7-under 66 in the opening round and eventually finished at 13-under.

Holpfer finished runner-up at both the 2018 and 2019 R&A Girls Amateur Championship. In 2018, at Ardglass Golf Club in Northern Ireland, Holpfer never trailed in her first four matches, and recorded a 2 and 1 victory over Alessia Nobilio in the quarterfinals. She was defeated, 2 and 1, in the final by fellow Austrian Emma Spitz, who become the first Austrian to win the Girls Amateur. In 2019, she lost the final, 4 and 3, to Pia Babnik in the championship match at Panmure Golf Club.

Holpfer finished runner-up in her debut event on the LET Access Series, the 2019 VP Bank Ladies Open at Gams-Werdenberg Golf Club in Gams, Switzerland, where she lost a playoff to home player Elena Moosmann. In total, she recorded 28 top-10 finishes in 82 WAGR events between 2014 and 2020, and reached a rank of 25th in the World Amateur Golf Ranking.

== College career ==
Holpfer attended the University of Georgia from 2020 to 2024 as a journalism major, and played with the Georgia Bulldogs women's golf team. She received the Marilyn Vincent Award as the senior female student-athlete across all sports with the highest cumulative grade point average.

== Professional career ==
Holpfer turned professional in 2024 and joined the 2025 LET Access Series, where she recorded a best finish of third at the Women's Irish Challenge.

== Amateur wins ==
- 2014 Austrian Match Play Championship
- 2015 Irish Women's Open Stroke Play Championship
- 2018 Slovenian Ladies Amateur, English Women's Open Amateur Stroke Play Championship

== Team appearances ==
Amateur

- European Young Masters (representing Austria): 2014
- Junior Vagliano Trophy (representing the Continent of Europe): 2015 (winners), 2017 (winners)
- European Girls' Team Championship (representing Austria): 2015, 2016, 2017
- European Ladies' Team Championship (representing Austria): 2019, 2021, 2022, 2023, 2024
- Espirito Santo Trophy (representing Austria): 2022
- European Nations Cup – Copa Sotogrande (representing Austria): 2023
