= Carla Bernat =

Spanish golfer (born 2004)

Personal information
- Full name: Carla Bernat Escuder
- Nationality: Spain
- Born: 2004 (age 21–22) Castellón de la Plana, Spain
- Height: 5 ft 6 in (168 cm)

Career
- Sport: Golf
- College: Tulane University; Kansas State University
- Turned professional: 2025
- Current tour: Epson Tour (since 2026)
- Professional wins: 2

Number of wins by tour
- Epson Tour: 1
- Other: 1

Best results in LPGA major championships
- Chevron Championship: CUT: 2025
- Women's PGA C'ship: DNP
- U.S. Women's Open: CUT: 2025, 2026
- Women's British Open: T58: 2025
- Evian Championship: CUT: 2025

Achievements and awards
- AAC Golfer of the Year: 2023

Carla Bernat Escuder (born 2004) is a Spanish professional golfer. She won the 2021 Spanish Ladies Amateur, 2024 Spirit International Amateur and 2025 Augusta National Women's Amateur.

== Early life ==
Bernat was born in Castellón de la Plana and initially was a tennis player, playing with neighbor Josele Ballester, before both switched to golf at a similar time.

== Amateur career ==
Bernat won the 2021 Spanish International Ladies Amateur Championship at Real Club de Golf de Sevilla, 2 and 1, in a final with compatriot Julia López Ramirez. She reached the semi-finals of the 2022 Women's Amateur Championship at Hunstanton Golf Club. At the 2023 European Ladies Amateur in Sweden, she finished runner-up two strokes behind Julia López Ramirez, and a stroke ahead of world number one Ingrid Lindblad in third.

Bernat had success with the National Team. She played on the winning Spanish team at the 2023 European Ladies' Team Championship in Finland, and she finished 3rd at the 2023 Espirito Santo Trophy alongside Julia López Ramirez and Cayetana Fernández.

Bernat attended Tulane University between 2021 and 2023, and played with the Tulane Green Wave women's golf team. She won three individual titles, and was named AAC Golfer of the Year as a sophomore. Ahead of her junior year she transferred to Kansas State University and the Kansas State Wildcats women's golf team, where she recorded five individual wins and was named All-American both seasons.

In 2024, she won the women's individual title in the Spirit International Amateur in Texas, and tied for 14th at the Andalucia Costa Del Sol Open De España, the Ladies European Tour season finale. She represented the International team in the Arnold Palmer Cup twice, and won the 2025 Augusta National Women's Amateur, a stroke ahead of Asterisk Talley. The win earned her exemptions into four of the LPGA Tour's five major championships.

== Professional career ==
Bernat turned professional in August 2025 and made her pro debut at the CPKC Women's Open on the LPGA Tour, where she made the cut.

In 2026, Bernat played mainly on the Epson Tour and won her first tournament as a professional at the Guardian Championship in September.

== Amateur wins ==
- 2018 Campeonato de Castellon, Campeonato Absoluto de las Comunidad Valenciana
- 2019 Campeonato de Alicante, Copa de la Comunidad Valenciana, Copa Match Play Comunidad Valenciana
- 2020 Campeonato de Espana Amateur "II Memorial Emma Villacieros"
- 2021 Spanish Ladies Amateur
- 2022 Ron Moore Invitational, Jim West Challenge
- 2023 Tulane Classic, Marilynn Smith Sunflower Invitational
- 2024 Liz Murphey Collegiate Classic, The Powercat Invitational, Spirit International Amateur (Women's Individual Champion)
- 2025 Mountain View Collegiate, Augusta National Women's Amateur, NCAA Lexington Regional

== Professional wins (2) ==
=== Epson Tour wins (1) ===
- 2026 Guardian Championship

=== Santander Golf Tour wins (1) ===
No.	Date	Tournament	Winning score	To par	Margin of victory	Runner-up
1	17 Jun 2021	Santander Golf Tour Málaga (as an amateur)	69-70=139	−5	4 strokes	(Spain) Natasha Fear

== Results in LPGA majors ==
Tournament	2025	2026
Chevron Championship	CUT	
U.S. Women's Open	CUT	CUT
Women's PGA Championship		
The Evian Championship	CUT	
Women's British Open	T58	

Did not play

CUT = missed the half-way cut
T = tied

== Team appearances ==
Amateur

- European Girls' Team Championship (representing Spain): 2020
- European Ladies' Team Championship (representing Spain): 2021, 2023 (winners), 2024
- Espirito Santo Trophy (representing Spain): 2023
- Arnold Palmer Cup (representing International team): 2023, 2024, 2025 (winners)
- Spirit International Amateur (representing Spain): 2024
