= 2023 European Ladies' Team Championship =

Golf competition

Tournament information
- Dates: 11–15 July 2023
- Location: Hämeenlinna, Finland; 60°59′55″N 24°31′40″E
- Course: Tawast Golf & Country Club
- Organized by: European Golf Association
- Format: 36 holes stroke play Knock-out match-play

Statistics
- Par: 72
- Length: 6,041 yards (5,524 m)
- Field: 19 teams 114 players

Champion
- Spain; Carla Bernat, Cayetana Fernández, Lucia Lopez Ortega, Julia López Ramirez, Carolina López-Chacarra, Carla Tejedo Mulet
- Qualification round: 691 (–29); Final match 4.5–2.5
- Location in Europe Location in Finland

The 2023 European Ladies' Team Championship took place 11–15 July at Tawast Golf & Country Club in Hämeenlinna, Finland. It was the 40th women's golf amateur European Ladies' Team Championship.

Team Spain won the championship.

== Venue ==
The hosting course is situated in Hämeenlinna (Tawastehus in Swedish) in southern Finland about 100 kilometers north of capital city Helsinki. The course, surrounded by woodland and a lake, was designed by architect Reijo Hillberg.

=== Course layout ===
Hole	Meters	Par	Hole	Meters	Par
1	302	4	10	349	4
2	426	5	11	121	3
3	382	4	12	313	4
4	454	5	13	345	4
5	350	4	14	142	3
6	305	4	15	300	4
7	116	3	16	411	5
8	339	4	17	325	4
9	132	3	18	412	5
Out	2,806	36	In	2,718	36
Source:		Total		5,524	72

== Format ==
Each team consisted of six players. On the first two days each player played 18 holes of stroke play each day. The lowest five scores from each team's six players counted to the team total each day.

The eight best teams formed flight A, in knock-out match-play over the following three days. The teams were seeded based on their positions after the stroke play. The first placed team was drawn to play the quarter final against the eight placed team, the second against the seventh, the third against the sixth and the fourth against the fifth. Teams were allowed to use six players during the team matches, selecting four of them in the two morning foursome games and five players in to the afternoon single games. Teams knocked out after the quarter finals played one foursome game and four single games in each of their remaining matches. Extra holes were played in games that are all square after 18 holes. However, if the result of the team match was already decided, games were declared halved.

The next eight teams in the stroke-play stage formed flight B, also played knock-out match-play, but with one foursome game and four single games in each match, to decide their final positions.

The teams placed 17–19 in the stroke-play stage formed flight C, to meet each other to decide their final positions.

== Teams ==
19 nation teams contested the event.

Participating teams
Country	Players
Austria	Chantal Düringer, Johanna Ebner, Isabella Holpfer, Hannah Mitterberger, Anna Neumayer, Katharina Zeilinger
Belgium	Diane Baillieux, Rebecca Becht, Sophie Bert, Diane Denis, Lara Meyers, Céline Manche
Czech Republic	Klara Hurtova, Veronika Kedronova, Patricie Macková, Hana Ryskova, Natalie Saint Germain, Agata Vahalova
Denmark	Cecilie Leth-Nissen, Christina Thouber, Emma Bunch, Olivia Grønborg, Anna Hjerrild Behnsen, Natacha Høst Husted
England	Jess Baker, Rosie Belsham, Charlotte Heath, Caley McGinty, Patience Rhodes, Lottie Woad
Finland	Krista Junkkari, Katri Bakker, Anna Backman, Henni Mustonen, Emilia Väistö, Oona Kuronen
France	Adéla Cernousek, Constance Fouillet, Justine Fournand, Vaïrana Heck, Maylis Lamoure, Loïs Lau
Germany	Charlotte Back, Helen Briem, Christin Eisenbeiß, Chiara Horder, Celina Sattelkau, Paula Schulz-Hanssen
Iceland	Andrea Bergsdottir, Hulda Clara Gestsdottir, Heidrun Anna Hlynsdottir, Anna Julia Olafsdottir, Perla Sol Sigurbrandsdottir, Saga Traustadottir
Ireland	Sara Byrne, Beth Coulter, Aine Donegan, Anna Foster, Kate Lanigan, Jessica Ross
Italy	Maria Vittoria Corbi, Caterina Don, Matilde Innocenti Angelini, Benedetta Moresco, Alessia Nobilio, Anna Zanusso
Scotland	Penelope Brown, Hannah Darling, Carmen Griffiths, Jasmine MackIntosh, Lorna McClymont, Jennifer Saxton
Slovakia	Petra Babicová, Katarína Drocárová, Viktória Krnáčová, Michaela Vávrová, Antónia Zacharovská, Alexandra Šulíková
Slovenia	Barbara Car, Eva Kiri Fevzer, Zala Jesih, Lana Malek, Neza Siftar, Ana Vehovar
Spain	Carla Bernat, Cayetana Fernández, Lucia Lopez Ortega, Julia López Ramirez, Carolina López-Chacarra, Carla Tejedo Mulet
Sweden	Kajsa Arwefjäll, Andrea Grimberg Lignell, Ingrid Lindblad, Louise Rydqvist, Moa Svedenskiöld, Meja Örtengren
Switzerland	Natalie Armbrüster, Ginnie Lee, Victoria Levy, Chiara Sola, Caroline Sturdza, Chiara Tamburlini
Turkey	Sude Bay, Ayse Demir, Almina Erdogan, Delfin Filiz, Deniz Sapmaz, Zeynep Sualp
Wales	Darcey Harry, Harriet Lockley, Kath O'Connor, Luca Thompson, Ffion Tynan, Carys Worby

== Winners ==
Team Sweden lead the opening 36-hole qualifying competition, with a 44 under par score of 676, 14 strokes ahead of team Germany.

Individual leader in the 36-hole stroke-play competition was, Meja Örtengren, Sweden, with a score of 13 under par 131, two strokes ahead of three players at tied second.

Team Spain won the championship, beating defending champion England 4 1/2–2 1/2 in the final and earned their sixth title.

Team Germany earned third place, beating Switzerland 6–1 in the bronze match.

== Results ==
Qualification round

Team standings after first round
Place	Country	Score	To par
1	Sweden	340	−20
2	Germany	345	−15
3	Spain	349	−11
4	Ireland	353	−7
5	England	354	−6
6	Denmark	356	−4
7	Finland	360	E
T8	Austria	363	+3
T8	Czech Republic	363	+3
T8	Switzerland	363	+3
11	Scotland	364	+4
12	France	368	+8
T13	Belgium	374	+14
T13	Italy	374	+14
15	Wales	375	+15
16	Iceland	376	+16
17	Slovakia	383	+23
T18	Slovenia	384	+24
T18	Turkey	384	+24

Team standings after final qualification round
Place	Country	Score	To par
1	Sweden	340-336=676	−44
2	Germany	345-345=690	−30
3	Spain	349-342=691	−29
4	England	354-351=705	−15
5	Ireland	353–354=707	−13
6	Czech Republic	363-365=718	−2
7	France	368-354=722	+2
8	Switzerland	363-360=723	+3
9	Austria	363-361=724	+4
10	Italy	374-351=725	+5
11	Scotland*	364-365=729	+9
12	Denmark	356–373=729	+9
13	Iceland	376-362=738	+18
14	Wales	375-364=739	+19
15	Finland	364-377=741	+21
16	Slovakia	383-368=751	+31
17	Belgium	374-382=756	+36
18	Slovenia	384-379=763	+43
19	Turkey	384–391=775	+55

* Note: In the event of a tie the order was determined by the
best total of the two non-counting scores of the two rounds.

Individual leaders
Place	Player	Country	Score	To par
1	Meja Örtengren	Sweden	66-65=131	−13
T2	Helen Briem	Germany	66-67=133	−11
T2	Ingrid Lindblad	Sweden	67-66=133	−11
T2	Julia Lopez Ramirez	Spain	67-66=133	−11
5	Lottie Woad	England	68-67=135	−9
6	Kajsa Arwefjäll	Sweden	66-70=136	−8
T7	Hulda Clara Gestsdottir	Iceland	71-66=137	−7
T7	Jessica Ross	Ireland	69-68=137	−7
T7	Louise Rydqvist	Sweden	70-67=137	−7
T10	Cayetana Fernández	Spain	70-68=138	−6
T10	Chiara Horder	Germany	65-73=138	−6
T10	Hana Ryskova	Czech Republic	69-69=138	−6
T10	Celina Sattelkau	Germany	70-68=138	−6

Note: There was no official award for the lowest individual scores.

Flight A

Bracket

Quarter finals
Switzerland	4
Sweden	3
England	4.5
Ireland	2.5
Spain	5.5
Czech Republic	1.5
Germany	4
France	3

Semi finals
England	5.5
Switzerland	1.5
Spain	5
Germany	2

Final
Spain	4.5
England	2.5
Bronze match
Germany	6
Switzerland	1

Elimination matches
Sweden	3
Ireland	2
Czech Republic	3
France	2

Match for 5th place
Sweden	4
Czech Republic	1
Match for 7th place
France	3.5
Ireland	1.5

Final games

Spain	England
4.5	2.5
J. Lopez Ramirez / L. Lopez Ortega	J. Baker / C. Heath 3 & 2
C. Fernandez / C. Bernat Escuder 2 & 1	C. McGinty / L. Woad
Julia Lopez Ramirez	Lottie Woad 5 & 4
Carolina Lopez-Chacarra Coto 3 & 2	Charlotte Heath
Carla Bernat Escuder 6 & 5	Patience Rhodes
Cayetana Fernandez 4 & 3	Caley McGinty
Carla Tejedo Mulet A/S *	Rosie Belsham A/S *

* Note: Game declared halved, since team match already decided.

Flight B

Bracket

Round 1
Austria	5
Slovakia	0
Denmark	4
Iceland	1
Scotland	4
Wales	1
Finland	4
Italy	1

Round 2
Denmark	3
Austria	2
Finland	3
Scotland	2

Match for 9th place
Denmark	3
Finland	2
Match for 11th place
Austria	3
Scotland	2

Elimination matches
Iceland	4
Slovakia	1
Italy	3
Wales	2

Match for 13th place
Italy	4
Iceland	1
Match for 15th place
Slovakia	3
Wales	2

Flight C

Team matches

0.5	Slovenia	Turkey	0.5
2.5		2.5	

1	Belgium	Turkey	0
5		0	

1	Belgium	Slovenia	0
3.5		1.5	

Team standings
Country	Place	W	T	L	Game points	Points
Belgium	17	2	0	0	8.5–1.5	2
Slovenia *	18	0	1	1	4–6	0.5
Turkey *	19	0	1	1	2.5–7.5	0.5

* Note: In the event of a tie the order was determined by the better total number of won games.

Final standings
Place	Country
1st place, gold medalist(s)	Spain
2nd place, silver medalist(s)	England
3rd place, bronze medalist(s)	Germany
4	Switzerland
5	Sweden
6	Czech Republic
7	France
8	Ireland
9	Denmark
10	Finland
11	Austria
12	Scotland
13	Italy
14	Iceland
15	Slovakia
16	Wales
17	Belgium
18	Slovenia
19	Turkey

== See also ==
- Espirito Santo Trophy – biennial world amateur team golf championship for women organized by the International Golf Federation.
- European Amateur Team Championship – European amateur team golf championship for men organised by the European Golf Association.
- European Ladies Amateur Championship – European amateur individual golf championship for women organised by the European Golf Association.
