= Smilla Tarning Sønderby =

Danish professional golfer

Personal information
- Nationality: Denmark
- Born: 22 July 2000 (age 26) Fredericia, Denmark
- Height: 5 ft 10 in (1.78 m)

Career
- Sport: Golf
- College: University of Mississippi
- Turned professional: 2021
- Current tour: LET (joined 2022)
- Professional wins: 2

Number of wins by tour
- Ladies European Tour: 2

Best results in LPGA major championships
- Chevron Championship: DNP
- Women's PGA C'ship: DNP
- U.S. Women's Open: CUT: 2022
- Women's British Open: CUT: 2026
- Evian Championship: DNP

Smilla Tarning Sønderby (born 22 July 2000) is a Danish professional golfer. She plays on the Ladies European Tour and won the 2023 KPMG Women's Irish Open and 2026 MCB Ladies Classic – Mauritius. In 2021, she won the NCAA Championship with Ole Miss.

== Amateur career ==
Sønderby, from Kolding Golf Club, joined the National Team in 2017 and represented Denmark at the 2018 European Girls' Team Championship, the 2019 European Nations Cup, and twice in the European Ladies' Team Championship, winning the bronze in 2020 together with Cecilie Finne-Ipsen, Sofie Kibsgaard Nielsen and Amalie Leth-Nissen after beating Switzerland 2 1/2–1/2 in the bronze match.

She lost the final of the 2019 Danish National Match Play Championship to Cecilie Finne-Ipsen, and in 2021 she finished runner-up at the Danish National Stroke Play Championship, one stroke behind Nicole Bonde Lorup.

Sønderby finished 3rd at the 2020 Portuguese International Ladies Amateur Championship, behind Alessia Nobilio and Carolina López-Chacarra.

She was educated at Handelsgymnasiet Ikast-Brande before enrolling at the University of Mississippi in 2020, majoring in journalism. Playing on the Ole Miss Rebels women's golf team, she helped her team win the 2021 NCAA Championship, taking part in three of four rounds and shooting a season-low round of 72 on the final day.

== Professional career ==
Sønderby quit university after one season and turned professional, after securing a place on the 2022 Ladies European Tour in Q-School at La Manga Club in December 2021. Her best finish in 2022 was a tie for fourth at the KPMG Women's Irish Open, where she sat in joint second place behind Moa Folke at the halfway point following opening rounds of 69 and 65 at Dromoland Castle. She finished her rookie season 69th in the Order of Merit and 9th in the Rookie of the Year rankings.

Sønderby made her major debut at the 2022 U.S. Women's Open at Pine Needles Lodge & Golf Club, after qualifying at Buckinghamshire Golf Club in England. She missed the cut after rounds of 75 and 73.

In 2023, Sønderby was in second place ahead of the final day of the Jabra Ladies Classic in South Africa, and finished the tournament fourth with a final round of 72.

In September 2023, she earned her first win on the Ladies European Tour at the KPMG Women's Irish Open.

Since the beginning of her professional career her caddie is Mikołaj Kniaginin. They first teamed up for the first stage of the LET Q-School.

== Amateur wins ==
- 2018 Mon Open
- 2019 Cobra-Puma Skanderborg Open, Bravo Tours Masters, DGU Elite Tour Finale Damer and Piger
- 2020 Lyngbygaard Junior Open

== Professional wins (2) ==
=== Ladies European Tour wins (2) ===
No.	Date	Tournament	Winning score	To par	Margin of victory	Runners-up
1	4 Jun 2023	KPMG Women's Irish Open	71-67-72-62=272	−16	Playoff	(Sweden) Lisa Pettersson (Netherlands) Anne Van Dam
2	3 May 2026	MCB Ladies Classic – Mauritius^	66-69-67=202	−14	1 stroke	(South Africa) Casandra Alexander (Sweden) Kajsa Arwefjäll

^Co-sanctioned with the Sunshine Ladies Tour

Ladies European Tour playoff record (1–0)

No.	Year	Tournament	Opponents	Result
1	2023	KPMG Women's Irish Open	(Sweden) Lisa Pettersson (Netherlands) Anne Van Dam	Won with eagle on first extra hole

== Team appearances ==
Amateur

- European Girls' Team Championship (representing Denmark): 2018
- European Ladies' Team Championship (representing Denmark): 2020, 2021
