= Chiara Horder =

German golfer

Personal information
- Nationality: Germany
- Born: 28 November 2002 (age 23) Munich, Germany
- Height: 168 cm (5 ft 6 in)

Career
- Sport: Golf
- College: Texas Tech University; Mississippi State University
- Status: Amateur

Best results in LPGA major championships
- Chevron Championship: DNP
- Women's PGA C'ship: DNP
- U.S. Women's Open: CUT: 2024
- Women's British Open: CUT: 2023
- Evian Championship: CUT: 2023

Chiara Horder (born 28 November 2002) is a German amateur golfer. She won The Women's Amateur Championship in 2023.

== Early life, education and family ==
Horder was born in Munich and was educated at Humboldt-Gymnasium Vaterstetten. Her older brother Nicolas is a professional golfer who attended University of Arkansas at Little Rock.

== Amateur career ==
In 2019, Horder won the German Match Play Championship and finished third at the English Girls' Open Amateur Stroke Play Championship. She also represented Germany at the World Junior Girls Championship in Canada.

In 2020, Horder joined the German National Team and won the European Girls' Team Championship in Hrubá Borša, Slovakia together with Charlotte Back, Sophie Witt and Paula Schulz-Hanssen. In the final against Sweden, Horder won her match 4 and 3 paired with Charlotte Back for a final scoreline of 2.5 to 0.5 in Germany's favor. Her team captured the bronze at the 2023 European Ladies' Team Championship.

Horder attended Texas Tech University and played with the Texas Tech Red Raiders women's golf team between 2021 and 2023. In 2023, she transferred to Mississippi State University where she helped the Mississippi State Bulldogs women's golf team win their first-ever Southeastern Conference title in 2024.

In June 2023, Horder won The Women's Amateur Championship at Prince's Golf Club in England. She defeated world number one Ingrid Lindblad in the semifinals and Annabelle Pancake of the United States 7 and 6 in the final to become Germany's third champion in six years, joining Leonie Harm (2018) and Aline Krauter (2020).

== Amateur wins ==
- 2019 German Match Play Championship
- 2023 The Women's Amateur Championship

== Team appearances ==
- World Junior Girls Championship (representing Germany): 2019
- European Girls' Team Championship (representing Germany): 2020 (winners)
- European Ladies' Team Championship (representing Germany): 2021, 2022, 2023, 2024 (winners), 2025
- Espirito Santo Trophy (representing Germany): 2023, 2025
- Vagliano Trophy (representing the Continent of Europe): 2023 (winners), 2025
