= Benedetta Moresco =

Italian professional golfer (born 2001)

Personal information
- Nickname: Etta
- Nationality: Italy
- Born: 22 August 2001 (age 25) Caldogno, Veneto, Italy

Career
- Sport: Golf
- College: University of Alabama
- Turned professional: 2023
- Current tour: LPGA Tour

Best results in LPGA major championships
- Chevron Championship: CUT: 2025, 2026
- Women's PGA C'ship: CUT: 2025
- U.S. Women's Open: T33: 2023
- Women's British Open: DNP
- Evian Championship: CUT: 2022, 2025

Achievements and awards
- SEC Scholar Athlete of the Year: 2022

Benedetta Moresco (born 22 August 2001) is an Italian professional golfer. She was the low amateur at the 2023 U.S. Women's Open.

== Amateur career ==
Moresco had a successful amateur career. In 2019, she won the Italian U18 International Women's Amateur Championship, was runner-up at the German Girls Open and at the Italian Ladies Stroke Play Championship, and reached the semi-finals of the Spanish International Ladies Amateur Championship. Ranked as one of the best juniors in Europe, she represented the continent in the Junior Solheim Cup at Gleneagles.

She represented Italy at the European Girls' Team Championship and then the European Ladies' Team Championship each year between 2017 and 2023, winning in 2018 with at team that included Alessia Nobilio, Emilie Alba Paltrinieri and Caterina Don.

In 2020, Moresco won the Annika Invitational USA. She shot a total of 4-under-par 212, to become the first Italian champion. She finished in sixth place at the 2021 European Ladies Amateur Championship and tied for 4th at the 2022 Augusta National Women's Amateur, two strokes behind winner Anna Davis.

Moresco enrolled at the University of Alabama in 2020 as a food and nutrition major, to play for the Alabama Crimson Tide women's golf team. Her sister Angelica, who joined the Epson Tour after graduating in 2022, was already on the team. Moresco played on the winning International Team at the 2022 Arnold Palmer Cup.

She won a 2-for-1 playoff against Agathe Laisné for the final qualifying spot at the 2023 U.S. Women's Open at Pebble Beach Golf Links. She shot a 70 in the opening round to sit tied 9th, 2 shots off the lead, and finished the tournament tied 33rd as the low amateur.

== Professional career ==
Moresco turned professional following the European Ladies' Team Championship in July 2023.

== Amateur wins ==
- 2016 Leone Di San Marco
- 2018 Italian U18 Trofeo Silvio Marazza
- 2019 Italian U18 International Women's Amateur Championship
- 2020 Annika Invitational USA
- 2021 The Ally, Italian Ladies Stroke Play Championship - Isa Goldschmid Trophy

== Results in LPGA majors ==
Results not in chronological order.

Tournament	2020	2021	2022	2023	2024	2025	2026
Chevron Championship						CUT	CUT
U.S. Women's Open	CUT			T33 LA			
Women's PGA Championship						CUT	
The Evian Championship	NT		CUT			CUT	
Women's British Open							

Did not play

LA = low amateur
CUT = missed the half-way cut
NT = no tournament
"T" = tied

== Team appearances ==
Amateur

- European Girls' Team Championship (representing Italy): 2017, 2018 (winners), 2019
- European Ladies' Team Championship (representing Italy): 2020, 2021, 2022, 2023
- Duke of York Young Champions Trophy: (representing Italy): 2018
- Junior Golf World Cup: (representing Italy): 2018
- Junior Solheim Cup (representing Europe): 2019
- World Junior Girls Championship (representing Italy): 2019
- Espirito Santo Trophy (representing Italy): 2022
- Arnold Palmer Cup (representing the International Team): 2022 (winners)
