= Cecilie Finne-Ipsen =

Danish professional golfer and badminton player (born 1998)

Personal information
- Nationality: Denmark
- Born: 14 March 1998 (age 28) Ballerup, Denmark
- Height: 165 cm (5 ft 5 in)

Career
- Sport: Golf
- College: University of North Carolina at Charlotte; Florida State University
- Turned professional: 2023
- Current tour: Ladies European Tour (joined 2024)
- Former tour: LET Access Series (joined 2023)
Medal record
Women's badminton
Representing Denmark
European U17 Championships
| Bronze medal – third place | 2013 Ankara | Girls' doubles |
| Bronze medal – third place | 2013 Ankara | Mixed team |

Cecilie Finne-Ipsen (born 14 March 1998) is a Danish professional golfer and Ladies European Tour player.

== Family and early years ==
Finne-Ipsen grew up in Ballerup, a suburb of Copenhagen, and started playing at Hjortespring Golf Club when she was 6, and trained seriously from the age of 13. Like her sister, Julie, she was an elite junior badminton player for Denmark with several international medals.

== Amateur career ==
Finne-Ipsen won the 2019 Danish National Match Play Championship and was runner-up at the 2022 French International Ladies Amateur Championship, a stroke behind Paris Appendino of Italy.

She attended the University of North Carolina at Charlotte and competed with the Charlotte 49ers women's golf team for three years 2018–2021, before transferring to Florida State University in 2021, where she earned her bachelor's degree in Business management in December 2022. As a senior on the Florida State Seminoles women's golf team, she helped to tie for fifth place in the NCAA Championship Finals, to the team title at the NCAA Tallahassee Regional Championship, and to a runner-up finish at the ACC Championship.

Finne-Ipsen was a part of the Danish National Team 2011–2022. She represented Denmark three times at the European Girls' Team Championship, and six times at the European Ladies' Team Championship, winning the bronze in 2020 alongside Smilla Tarning Sønderby, Sofie Kibsgaard Nielsen and Amalie Leth-Nissen, after beating Switzerland 2 1/2–1/2 in the bronze match.

== Professional career ==
Finne-Ipsen turned professional in the beginning of 2023 and joined the LET Access Series. She tied for 4th at the Trust Golf Links Series and 3rd at the Calatayud Ladies Open in her rookie season, and earned conditional LET membership for the 2024 season at Q-School, before earning full membership for 2025.

== Amateur wins ==
- 2013 AON Junior Tour #1
- 2016 DGU Elite Tour #1
- 2018 Wiibroe Cup
- 2019 Danish National Match Play Championship, Idle Hour Collegiate

== Team appearances ==
Amateur

- European Girls' Team Championship (representing Denmark): 2013, 2014, 2016
- World Junior Girls Championship (representing Denmark): 2016
- European Ladies' Team Championship (representing Denmark): 2017, 2018, 2019, 2020, 2021, 2022
- European Nations Cup - Copa Sotogrande (representing Denmark): 2018
- Spirit International Amateur (representing Denmark): 2021
- Espirito Santo Trophy (representing Denmark): 2022
