= Paltrinieri =

Paltrinieri is an Italian surname from Emilia-Romagna, particularly Modena, possibly related to the term paltoniere 'beggar', of Old French origin (cf. Middle English pautener). Notable people with the surname include:

- Emilie Alba Paltrinieri (born 2001), Italian golfer
- Gregorio Paltrinieri (born 1994), Italian swimmer
