= 2020 European Ladies' Team Championship =

Golf competition

Tournament information
- Dates: 9–12 september 2020
- Location: Uppsala, Sweden; 59°50′22″N 17°29′42″E
- Course: Upsala Golf Club
- Organized by: European Golf Association
- Format: 18 holes stroke play Knock-out match-play

Statistics
- Par: 72
- Length: 6.100 yards (5.578 m)
- Field: 12 teams 48 players

Champion
- Sweden; Linn Grant, Ingrid Lindblad, Maja Stark, Beatrice Wallin
- Qualification round: 218 (+2); Final match 2–1
- Location in Europe Location in Sweden Location in Uppsala municipality

The 2020 European Ladies' Team Championship took place 9–12 July at Upsala Golf Club, in Uppsala, Sweden. It was the 37th women's golf amateur European Ladies' Team Championship.

== Venue ==
The hosting Upsala Golf Club was founded in 1937, the 22nd oldest golf club in Sweden. The course, located in Håmö, 9 kilometres west of the city center of Uppsala, the fourth-largest city in Sweden, was inaugurated in 1965, initially designed by Gregor Paulsson and renovated in 2007–2008 by Canadian golf course architect Robert Kains.

The championship course was set up with par 72 over 6,100 yards.

== Format ==
The 2020 Championship was played in a different season and in a modified format than usual.

Due to the COVID-19 pandemic, the championship was played in a reduced format, with 12 teams participating, each of them with four players. All competitors played one 18-hole-round of stroke-play on the first day. The team scores were based on the leading three scores of each team.

After the first day, the leading eight teams formed flight A and competed in knock-out match-play over the next three days. The teams were being seeded based on their positions after the stroke play. Contests consisted of one foursome game in the morning and two singles in the afternoon. If a game was level after 18 holes, extra holes were played to get a result, although if the overall match result was already determined, later games that were level after 18 holes were halved.

The remaining four teams, not qualified for Flight A, formed Flight B, to meet each other to determine their final standings.

== Teams ==
12 nation teams contested the event. Each team consisted of four players.

Among teams not participating were England, Scotland, Ireland and Wales.

Players in the teams

Country	Players
Belgium	Rebecca Becht, Charlotte De Corte, Clarisse Louis, Céline Manche
Czech Republic	Kristyna Frydlova, Sára Kousková, Tereza Melecká, Jana Melichová
Denmark	Cecilie Finne-Ipsen, Sofie Kibsgaard Nielsen, Amalie Leth-Nissen, Smilla Tarning Sønderby
France	Gala Dumez, Agathe Laisné, Lucie Malchirand, Pauline Roussin-Bouchard
Germany	Alexandra Försterling, Aline Krauter, Paula Schulz-Hanssen, Helen Tamy Kreuzer
Iceland	Andrea Bergsdottir, Hulda Clara Gestsdottir, Heidrun Anna Hlynsdottir, Saga Traustadottir
Italy	Alessandra Fanali, Benedetta Moresco, Alessia Nobilio, Anna Zanusso
Netherlands	Anne-Sterre den Dunnen, Lauren Holmey, Romy Meekers, Danielle Modder
Slovakia	Anika Bolcikova, Katarina Drocarova, Antonia Zacharovska, Sara Zrnikova
Spain	Marta Garcia Llorca, Carolina López-Chacarra, Ana Peláez, Teresa Toscano Borrero
Sweden	Linn Grant, Ingrid Lindblad, Maja Stark, Beatrice Wallin
Switzerland	Tiffany Arafi, Lily Huerlimann, Ginnie Lee, Caroline Sturdza

== Winners ==
Team Switzerland lead the opening 18-hole qualifying competition, with a 3 under par score of 216, four strokes ahead of France.

Individual leader in the 18-hole stroke-play competition was Pauline Roussin-Bouchard, France, with a score of 4 under par 68, one stroke ahead Ginnie Lee, Switzerland.

Host nation and defending champions Sweden won the championship, beating Germany 2–1 in the final and earned their tenth title and the third in a row.

Team Denmark earned third place, beating Switzerland 2 1/2–1/2 in the bronze match.

== Results ==
Qualification round

Team standings

Place	Country	Score	To par
1	Switzerland	213	−3
2	France	215	−1
T3	Denmark *	216	E
T3	Italy	216	E
T5	Sweden *	218	+2
T5	Spain	218	+2
7	Germany	220	+4
8	Iceland	221	+5
9	Czech Republic	224	+8
T10	Netherlands *	231	+15
T10	Slovakia	231	+15
12	Belgium	234	+18

* Note: In the event of a tie the order was determined by the better total non-counting scores.

Individual leaders

Place	Player	Country	Score	To par
1	Pauline Roussin-Bouchard	France	68	−4
2	Ginnie Lee	Switzerland	69	−3
3	Cecilie Finne-Ipsen	Denmark	70	−2
3	Aline Krauter	Germany	70	−2
3	Ingrid Lindblad	Sweden	70	−2
T6	Hulda Clara Gestsdottir	Iceland	71	−1
T6	Benedetta Moresco	Italy	71	−1
T6	Caroline Sturdza	Switzerland	71	−1
T9	Sara Kouskova	Czech Republic	72	E
T9	Agathe Laisné	France	72	E
T9	Alessia Nobilio	Italy	72	E
T9	Ana Peláez	Spain	72	E

Note: There was no official award for the lowest individual score.

Flight A

Bracket

Quarter finals
Switzerland	3
Iceland	0
Sweden	2
Italy	1
Denmark	2
Spain	1
Germany	2
France	1

Semi finals
Sweden	3
Switzerland	0
Germany	2
Denmark	1

Final
Sweden	2
Germany	1
Bronze match
Denmark	2.5
Switzerland	0.5

Elimination matches
Italy	3
Iceland	0
France	2
Spain	1

Match for 5th place
Italy	2
France	1
Match for 7th place
Spain	3
Iceland	0

Final games

Sweden	Germany
2	1
M. Stark / B. Wallin 4 & 3	A. Fosterling / H. Tamy Kreutzer
Linn Grant 3 & 2	Paula Schultz-Hansen
Ingrid Lindblad	Aline Krauter 3 & 2

Flight B

Team matches

1	Czech Republic	Belgium	0
2.5		0.5	

1	Netherlands	Slovakia	0
3		0	

1	Netherlands	Belgium	0
3		0	

1	Czech Republic	Slovakia	0
2		1	

1	Belgium	Slovakia	0
2		1	

1	Czech Republic	Netherlands	0
2		1	

Team standings

Country	Place	W	T	L	Game points	Points
Czech Republic	9	3	0	0	6.5–2.5	3
Netherlands	10	2	0	1	7–2	2
Belgium	11	1	0	2	2.5–6.5	1
Slovakia	12	0	0	3	2–7	0

Final standings

Place	Country
1st place, gold medalist(s)	Sweden
2nd place, silver medalist(s)	Germany
3rd place, bronze medalist(s)	Denmark
4	Switzerland
5	Italy
6	France
7	Spain
8	Iceland
9	Czech Republic
10	Netherlands
11	Belgium
12	Slovakia

== See also ==
- Espirito Santo Trophy – biennial world amateur team golf championship for women organized by the International Golf Federation.
- European Amateur Team Championship – European amateur team golf championship for men organised by the European Golf Association.
- European Ladies Amateur Championship – European amateur individual golf championship for women organised by the European Golf Association.
