= 2024 European Ladies' Team Championship =

Golf competition

Tournament information
- Dates: 9–13 July 2024
- Location: Madrid, Spain; 40.6080°N 3.5915°W
- Course: Real Sociedad Hípica Española Club de Campo (North Course)
- Organized by: European Golf Association
- Format: 36 holes stroke play Knock-out match-play

Statistics
- Par: 72
- Length: 6,312 yards (5,772 m)
- Field: 19 teams 114 players

Champion
- Germany; Charlotte Back, Helen Briem, Christin Eisenbeiss, Chiara Horder, Celina Sattelkau, Paula Schulz-Hanssen
- Qualification round: 365 (+5); Final match 4.5 – 2.5
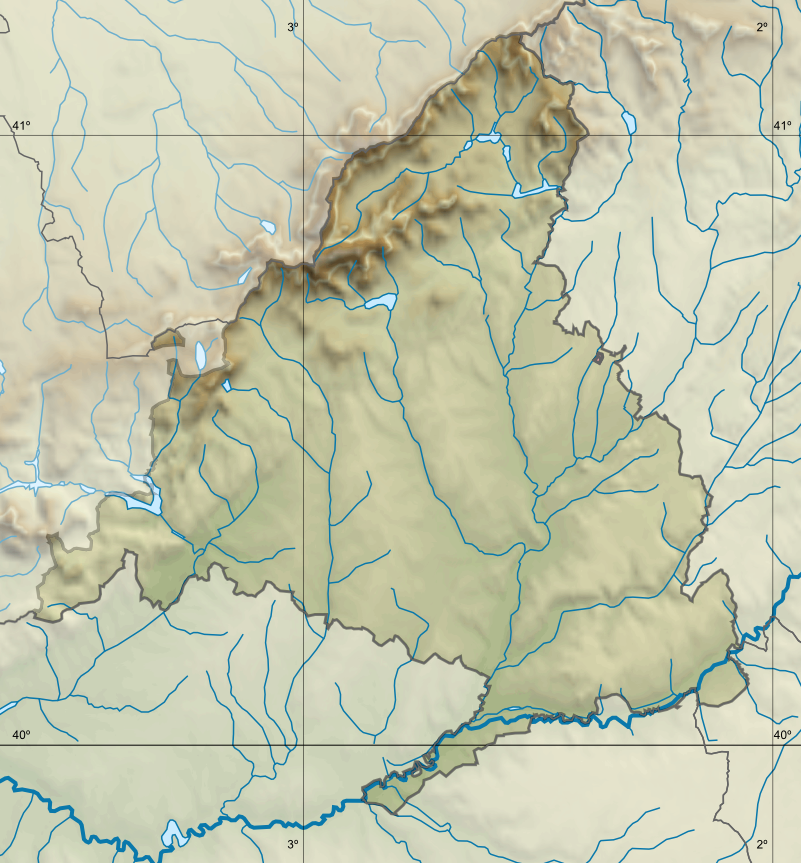
- Location in Europe Location in Spain Location in the Community of Madrid

The 2024 European Ladies' Team Championship took place 9–13 July at Real Sociedad Hípica Española Club de Campo in Madrid, Spain. It was the 41st women's golf amateur European Ladies' Team Championship.

Host nation Spain was defending champion.

== Venue ==
The first 18 holes at the hosting club, Real Sociedad Hípica Española Club de Campo, were completed in 1997, located north of Madrid, Spain, in the district of Soto de Viñuelas forest, 35 kilometres from the city center. The course had previously hosted the 2007 Madrid Open and the 2010 Madrid Masters on the men's European Tour. The club has since then completed another 18 holes. Both corses were designed by Robert von Hagge, known for also designing Le Golf National, outside Paris, France.

=== Course layout ===
Hole	Meters	Par	Hole	Meters	Par
1	469	5	10	358	4
2	349	4	11	142	3
3	334	4	12	469	5
4	340	4	13	309	4
5	132	3	14	324	4
6	357	4	15	278	4
7	435	5	16	164	3
8	155	3	17	362	4
9	339	4	18	456	5
Out	2,910	36	In	2,862	36
Source:		Total		5,772	72

== Format ==
Each team consisted of six players. On the first two days each player played 18 holes of stroke play each day. The lowest five scores from each team's six players counted to the team total each day.

The eight best teams formed flight A, in knock-out match-play over the following three days. The teams were seeded based on their positions after the stroke play. The first placed team was drawn to play the quarter final against the eight placed team, the second against the seventh, the third against the sixth and the fourth against the fifth. Teams were allowed to use six players during the team matches, selecting four of them in the two morning foursome games and five players in to the afternoon single games. Teams knocked out after the quarter finals played one foursome game and four single games in each of their remaining matches. Extra holes were played in games that were all square after 18 holes. However, if the result of the team match was already decided, games were declared halved.

The next eight teams in the stroke-play stage formed flight B, also played knock-out match-play, but with one foursome game and four single games in each match, to decide their final positions.

The teams placed 17–19 in the stroke-play stage formed flight C, to meet each other to decide their final positions.

== Teams ==
19 teams contested the event. Team Portugal withdraw before the event started.

Participating teams
Country	Players
Austria	Johanna Ebner, Isabella Holpfer, Hannah Mitterberger, Anna Neumayer, Leonie Sinnhuber, Katharina Zeilinger
Belgium	Diane Baillieux, Sophie Bert, Savannah De Bock, Emma Defleur, Diane Denis, Elsie Verhoeven
Czech Republic	Sofie Hlinomazová, Klara Hurtová, Veronika Kedroñová, Natálie Saint Germain, Denisa Vodicková, Gabriela Roberta
Denmark	Benedicte Brent-Buchholz, Emma Bunch, Anna Hjerrild Behnsen, Olivia Grønborg Skousen, Cecilie Leth-Nissen, Marie Eline Madsen
England	Jess Baker, Rosie Belsham, Lily Hirst, Nellie Ong, Mimi Rhodes, Patience Rhodes
Finland	Emilia Väistö, Henni Mustonen, Oona Kuronen, Fanni Grönlund, Elina Saksa, Adeliina Virtanen
France	Inés Archer, Valentine Delon, Gala Dumez, Constance Fouillet, Vaïrana Heck, Louise Reau
Germany	Charlotte Back, Helen Briem, Christin Eisenbeiss, Chiara Horder, Celina Sattelkau, Paula Schulz-Hanssen
Iceland	Andrea Bergsdóttir, Anna Júlía Ólafsdóttir, Guðrún Jóna Nolan Þorsteinsdóttir, Heiðrún Anna Hlynsdóttir, Hulda Clara Gestsdóttir, Perla Sól Sigurbrandsdóttir
Ireland	Sara Byrne, Beth Coulter, Áine Donegan, Emma Fleming, Anna Foster, Annabel Wilson
Italy	Francesca Fiorellini, Carolina Melgrati, Alessia Nobilio, Francesca Carola Pompa, Elena Verticchio, Anna Zanusso
Netherlands	Rosanne Boere, Anne-Sterre Den Dunnen, Minouche Rooijmans, Hester Sicking, Fleur Van Beek, Noa Van Beek
Scotland	Megan Ashley, Carmen Griffiths, Jasmine Mackintosh, Lorna McClymont, Freya Russell, Jennifer Saxton
Slovakia	Katarina Drocárová, Alexandra Maliková, Rebecca Ann Náhliková, Laura Pósová, Alexandra Suliková, Michaela Vávrová
Slovenia	Barbara Car, Eva Kiri Fevzer, Zala Jesih, Mia Lavrih, Lana Malek, Neza Siftar
Spain	Julia López Ramirez, Andrea Revuelta Goicoechea, Paula Martín Sampedro, Carla Bernat, Cayetana Fernández García-Poggio, Carla Tejedo Mulet
Sweden	Meja Örtengren, Louise Rydqvist, Nora Sundberg, Josefin Widal, Elin Pudas Remler, Moa Svedenskiöld
Switzerland	Natalie Armbrüster, Yana Beeli, Victoria Levy, Carlota Locatelli, Romaine Masserey, Carolina Sturdza
Wales	Annabel Collis, Darcey Harry, Harriet Lockley, Gracie Mayo, Luca Thompson, Ffion Tynan

== Winners ==
Defending champions team Spain led the opening 36-hole qualifying competition, with a 10-under-par score of 710, one stroke ahead of team England. The individual leader in the 36-hole stroke-play competition wa, Marie Eline Madsen, Denmark, with a score of 9-under-par 135, one stroke ahead of Paula Martín Sampedro, Spain.

Team Germany won the championship, beating France 4 1/2–2 1/2 in the final and earned their second title. Team England earned third place, beating Ireland 5–2 in the bronze match.

== Results ==
Qualification round

Team standings after first round
Place	Country	Score	To par
1	Denmark	358	−2
2	England	361	+1
3	Spain *	362	+2
4	Ireland *	362	+2
5	Italy	362	+2
6	France	364	+4
7	Germany	365	+5
8	Wales	370	+10
9	Sweden	372	+12
10	Finland	375	+15
11	Switzerland	378	+18
12	Czech Republic	381	+21
13	Belgium *	383	+23
14	Netherlands	383	+23
15	Scotland *	385	+25
16	Iceland	385	+25
17	Slovakia *	383	+32
18	Austria	383	+32
19	Slovenia	393	+33

* Note: In the event of a tie the order was determined by the
best of the non-counting scores in each of the tied teams.

Team standings after final qualification round
Place	Country	Score	To par
1	Spain	362-348=710	−10
2	England	361-350=711	−9
3	France	364-350=714	−6
4	Ireland	362-355=717	−3
5	Denmark	358–360=718	−2
6	Sweden	372-350=722	+2
7	Italy	362-362=724	+4
8	Germany	365-365=730	+10
9	Wales *	370-372=742	+22
10	Netherlands	383-359=742	+22
11	Belgium	383-368=751	+31
12	Finland *	375–380=755	+35
13	Czech Republic *	381-374=755	+35
14	Scotland	385-370=755	+35
15	Iceland	385-377=762	+42
16	Switzerland	378-391=769	+49
17	Austria	392-380=772	+52
18	Slovenia	393-383=776	+56
19	Slovakia	392–387=779	+59

* Note: In the event of a tie the order was determined by the
best total of the two non-counting scores of the two rounds.

Individual leaders
Place	Player	Country	Score	To par
1	Marie Eline Madsen	Denmark	70-65=135	−9
2	Paula Martín Sampedro	Spain	68-68=136	−8
T3	Beth Coulter	Ireland	68-70=138	−6
T3	Constance Fouillet	France	72-66=138	−6
T5	Carolina Melgrati	Italy	70-69=139	−5
T5	Mimi Rhodes	England	71-68=139	−5
T7	Benedicte Brent Buchholz	Denmark	69-71=140	−4
T7	Anna Foster	Ireland	71-69=140	−4
T7	Carmen Griffiths	Scotland	75-65=140	−4
T7	Lily Hirst	England	70-70=140	−4
T7	Veronika Kedronova	Czech Republic	69-71=140	−4

Note: There was no official award for the lowest individual score.

Flight A

Bracket

Quarter finals
Germany	4.5
Spain	2.5
Ireland	5
Denmark	2
France	4.5
Sweden	2.5
England	6
Italy	1

Semi finals
Germany	4.5
Ireland	2.5
France	4
England	3

Final
Germany	4.5
France	2.5
Bronze match
England	5
Ireland	2

Elimination matches
Spain	4.5
Denmark	0.5
Italy	3
Sweden	2

Match for 5th place
Spain	3.5
Italy	1.5
Match for 7th place
Sweden	4
Denmark	1

Final games
Germany	France
4.5	2.5
C. Back / P. Schultz-Hanssen 21st hole	G. Dumez / L. Reau
H. Briem / C. Sattelkau	C. Fouillet / V. Delon 1 hole
Christine Eisenbeiss A/S	Constance Fouillet A/S
Paula Schultz-Hanssen 2 & 1	Ines Archer
Charlotte Back	Louise Reau 1 hole
Chiara Horder 3 & 2	Valentine Delon
Helen Briem 4 & 2	Gala Dumez

Flight B

Bracket

Round 1
Wales	3.5
Switzerland	1.5
Finland	3
Czech Republic	2
Scotland	4
Belgium	1
Netherlands	4
Iceland	1

Round 2
Wales	3
Finland	2
Scotland	3.5
Netherlands	1.5

Match for 9th place
Wales	3
Scotland	2
Match for 11th place
Finland	3.5
Netherlands	1.5

Elimination matches
Czech Republic	3.5
Switzerland	1.5
Iceland	3.5
Belgium	1.5

Match for 13th place
Czech Republic	4.5
Iceland	0.5
Match for 15th place
Belgium	3
Switzerland	2

Flight C

Team matches

0	Slovenia	Slovakia	1
2		3	

1	Austria	Slovakia	0
3		2	

1	Austria	Slovenia	0
3.5		1.5	

Team standings
Country	Place	W	T	L	Game points	Points
Austria	17	2	0	0	6.5 – 3.5	2
Slovakia	18	1	0	1	5 – 5	1
Slovenia	19	0	0	2	3.5 – 1.5	0

Final standings
Place	Country
1st place, gold medalist(s)	Germany
2nd place, silver medalist(s)	France
3rd place, bronze medalist(s)	England
4	Ireland
5	Spain
6	Italy
7	Sweden
8	Denmark
9	Wales
10	Scotland
11	Finland
12	Netherlands
13	Czech Republic
14	Iceland
15	Belgium
16	Switzerland
17	Austria
18	Slovakia
19	Slovenia

== See also ==
- Espirito Santo Trophy – biennial world amateur team golf championship for women organized by the International Golf Federation.
- European Amateur Team Championship – European amateur team golf championship for men organised by the European Golf Association.
- European Ladies Amateur Championship – European amateur individual golf championship for women organised by the European Golf Association.
