= 2022 Arnold Palmer Cup =

Team golf competition in Switzerland

- Dates: 1–3 July 2022
- Venue: Golf Club de Genève
- Location: Vandœuvres, Switzerland
International	33	27	USA
- International team wins the Arnold Palmer Cup

The 2022 Arnold Palmer Cup was a team golf competition to be held from 1–3 July 2022 at Golf Club de Genève, Vandœuvres, Switzerland. It was the 26th time the event had been contested and the fifth under the new format in which women golfers play in addition to men, and the United States plays an international team. The international team won the match 33–27.

== Format ==
The contest was played over three days. On Friday, there were 12 mixed four-ball matches. On Saturday there were 24 foursomes matches, 12 in the morning, six all-women matches and six all-men matches, and 12 mixed matches in the afternoon. 24 singles matches were played on Sunday. In all, 60 matches were played.

Each of the 60 matches was worth one point in the larger team competition. If a match was all square after the 18th hole, each side earned half a point toward their team total. The team that accumulated at least 30½ points won the competition.

== Teams ==
The teams were announced on 19 April 2022. Six women and six men from each team were selected from the final Arnold Palmer Cup Rankings. Natasha Andrea Oon and Eugenio Chacarra were selected for the international team but turned professional before the event.

United States
Name	College	Qualification method
Kory Henkes	non-playing head coach	
Jim Ott	non-playing head coach	
Bill Allcorn	non-playing assistant coach	
Ryan Potter	non-playing assistant coach	
Women
Amari Avery	USC	Arnold Palmer Cup Ranking
Rachel Heck	Stanford	Committee selection
Gurleen Kaur	Baylor	Arnold Palmer Cup Ranking
Rachel Kuehn	Wake Forest	Arnold Palmer Cup Ranking
Antonia Malate	San Jose State	Arnold Palmer Cup Ranking
Olivia Mitchell	Dallas Baptist	Committee selection
Anna Morgan	Furman	Replacement
Calynne Rosholt	Arizona State	Arnold Palmer Cup Ranking
Brooke Seay	Stanford	Committee selection
Erica Shepherd	Duke	Committee selection
Latanna Stone	LSU	Committee selection
Rose Zhang	Stanford	Arnold Palmer Cup Ranking
Men
Sam Bennett	Texas A&M	Arnold Palmer Cup Ranking
Michael Brennan	Wake Forest	Committee selection
Jake Doggett	Midwestern State	Committee selection
Nick Gabrelcik	North Florida	Coach's pick
Palmer Jackson	Notre Dame	Committee selection
Johnny Keefer	Baylor	Arnold Palmer Cup Ranking
Walker Lee	Texas A&M	Arnold Palmer Cup Ranking
Dylan Menante	Pepperdine	Committee selection
Gordon Sargent	Vanderbilt	Arnold Palmer Cup Ranking
Cole Sherwood	Vanderbilt	Arnold Palmer Cup Ranking
Michael Thorbjornsen	Stanford	Committee selection
Travis Vick	Texas	Arnold Palmer Cup Ranking

International
Name	Country	College	Qualification method
Diana Cantú	Mexico	non-playing head coach	
Phil Rowe	England	non-playing head coach	
Golda Borst	Sweden	non-playing assistant coach	
Barry Fennelly	Ireland	non-playing assistant coach	
Women
Kajsa Arwefjäll	Sweden	San Jose State	Coach's pick
Carolina López-Chacarra	Spain	Wake Forest	Arnold Palmer Cup Ranking
Alexandra Försterling	Germany	Arizona State	Arnold Palmer Cup Ranking
Aline Krauter	Germany	Stanford	Arnold Palmer Cup Ranking
Ashley Lau	Malaysia	Michigan	Arnold Palmer Cup Ranking
Heather Lin	Taiwan	Oregon	Replacement
Julia Lopez Ramirez	Spain	Mississippi State	Committee selection
Hsin-Yu Lu	Taiwan	Oregon	Committee selection
Lorna McClymont	Scotland	Stirling	R&A Student Tour Series
Benedetta Moresco	Italy	Alabama	Committee selection
Chiara Tamburlini	Switzerland	Ole Miss	Replacement
Amelia Williamson	England	Florida State	Committee selection
Men
Ludvig Åberg	Sweden	Texas Tech	Arnold Palmer Cup Ranking
José Luis Ballester	Spain	Arizona State	Replacement
Albin Bergström	Sweden	South Florida	Arnold Palmer Cup Ranking
Fred Biondi	Brazil	Florida	Arnold Palmer Cup Ranking
Archie Davies	Wales	East Tennessee State	Committee selection
Adrien Dumont de Chassart	Belgium	Illinois	Arnold Palmer Cup Ranking
Mateo Fernández de Oliveira	Argentina	Arkansas	Committee selection
David Kitt	Ireland	Maynooth	R&A Student Tour Series
Frederik Kjettrup	Denmark	Florida State	Arnold Palmer Cup Ranking
Christo Lamprecht	South Africa	Georgia Tech	Committee selection
James Leow	Singapore	Arizona State	Coach's pick
Rasmus Neergaard-Petersen	Denmark	Oklahoma State	Committee selection

== Friday's mixed fourball matches ==
The International team took a one-point lead after the opening round of matches after winning five of the 12 matches. The United States won four with the other three matches tied.

Match	International	Results	United States
1	Åberg/Försterling	1 up	Bennett/Shepherd
2	Dumont de Chassart/Lau	2 & 1	Malate/Menante
3	Kjettrup/Krauter	tied	Stone/Vick
4	Arwefjäll/Bergstrom	4 & 3	Doggett/Morgan
5	Fernández de Oliveria/Lopez Ramirez	1 up	Kaur/Lee
6	Ballester/Chacarra	4 & 3	Brennan/Kuehn
7	Biondi/Moresco	tied	Rosholt/Sherwood
8	Neergaard-Petersen/Tamburlini	2 up	Keefer/Mitchell
9	Kitt/McClymont	tied	Jackson/Seay
10	Davies/Williamson	4 & 2	Gabrelcik/Heck
11	Leow/Lu	2 & 1	Avery/Sargent
12	Lamprecht/Lin	1 up	Thorbjornsen/Zhang
	6½	Session	5½
	6½	Overall	5½

== Saturday's matches ==
=== Morning foursomes matches ===
The International team won the second session by a point and increased their lead to two points.

Match	Tee	International	Results	United States
13	1	Moresco/Tamburlini	4 & 2	Heck/Shepherd
14	10	Davies/Lamprecht	1 up	Gabrelcik/Menante
15	1	Biondi/Neergaard-Petersen	1 up	Sargent/Sherwood
16	10	Lin/Lu	tied	Kaur/Malate
17	1	Chacarra/Lopez Ramirez	6 & 5	Mitchell/Rosholt
18	10	Kitt/Leow	3 & 1	Brennan/Jackson
19	1	Ballester/Fernández de Oliveria	1 up	Doggett/Vick
20	10	McClymont/Williamson	5 & 4	Morgan/Stone
21	1	Försterling/Krauter	2 & 1	Seay/Zhang
22	10	Dumont de Chassart/Kjettrup	2 & 1	Bennett/Lee
23	1	Åberg/Bergstrom	5 & 3	Keefer/Thorbjornsen
24	10	Arwefjäll/Lau	2 & 1	Avery/Kuehn
		6½	Session	5½
		13	Overall	11

=== Afternoon mixed foursomes matches ===
The United States won the second session by 7 points to 5, to level the match.

Match	Tee	International	Results	United States
25	1	Ballester/Chacarra	tied	Gabrelcik/Heck
26	10	Davies/Williamson	2 & 1	Malate/Menante
27	1	Fernández de Oliveira/Lopez Ramirez	2 & 1	Rosholt/Sherwood
28	10	Lin/Lu	3 & 2	Kaur/Malate
29	1	Biondi/Moresco	tied	Stone/Vick
30	10	Kitt/McClymont	2 & 1	Bennett/Shepherd
31	1	Neergaard-Petersen/Tamburlini	3 & 2	Kaur/Lee
32	10	Leow/Lu	4 & 3	Keefer/Morgan
33	1	Åberg/Försterling	4 & 3	Jackson/Seay
34	10	Dumont de Chassart/Lau	1 up	Thorbjornsen/Zhang
35	1	Kjettrup/Krauter	1 up	Brennan/Kuehn
36	10	Arwefjäll/Bergstrom	4 & 3	Avery/Sargent
		5	Session	7
		18	Overall	18

== Sunday's singles matches ==
The International team regained the Arnold Palmer Cup by 33 points to 27, winning 13 matches to the 7 wins by the United States. Four matches finished as ties.

Match	Tee	International	Results	United States
37	1	Julia Lopez Ramirez	4 & 3	Brooke Seay
38	10	Benedetta Moresco	4 & 3	Latanna Stone
39	1	Alexandra Forsterling	4 & 3	Erica Shepherd
40	10	Aline Krauter	3 & 2	Rachel Heck
41	1	Archie Davies	1 up	Dylan Menante
42	10	Josele Ballester	2 & 1	Palmer Jackson
43	1	Christo Lamprecht	3 & 2	Travis Vick
44	10	Mateo Fernández de Oliveira	4 & 3	Johnny Keefer
45	1	Lorna McClymont	6 & 5	Amari Avery
46	10	Frederik Kjettrup	2 up	Michael Thorbjornsen
47	1	James Leow	1 up	Cole Sherwood
48	10	Ashley Lau	tied	Calynne Rosholt
49	1	Amelia Williamson	tied	Rose Zhang
50	10	Ludvig Åberg	tied	Nick Gabrelcik
51	1	Fred Biondi	3 & 1	Sam Bennett
52	10	Chiara Tamburlini	3 & 1	Olivia Mitchell
53	1	Carolina Chacarra	1 up	Antonia Malate
54	10	David Kitt	2 & 1	Jake Doggett
55	1	Adrien Dumont de Chassart	4 & 3	Michael Brennan
56	10	Kajsa Arwefjäll	2 & 1	Anna Morgan
57	1	Heather Lin	tied	Rachel Kuehn
58	10	Albin Bergstrom	5 & 4	Gordon Sargent
59	1	Rasmus Neergaard-Petersen	5 & 4	Walker Lee
60	10	Hsin-Yu Lu	4 & 3	Gurleen Kaur
		15	Session	9
		33	Overall	27

== Michael Carter award ==
The Michael Carter Award winners were James Leow and Cole Sherwood.
