= Celina Sattelkau =

German professional golfer (born 2001)

Personal information
- Full name: Celina Rosa Sattelkau
- Nationality: Germany
- Born: 11 July 2001 (age 25) Speyer, Germany
- Height: 160 cm (5 ft 3 in)

Career
- Sport: Golf
- College: Vanderbilt University
- Turned professional: 2024
- Current tours: Ladies European Tour (joined 2025); Sunshine Ladies Tour (joined 2026)
- Professional wins: 2

Achievements and awards
- Dinah Shore Trophy Award: 2024

Celina Sattelkau (born 11 July 2001) is a German professional golfer and Ladies European Tour player. In February 2026, she won two consecutive Sunshine Ladies Tour tournaments.

== Amateur career ==
Sattelkau was born in Speyer and joined Golf Club St. Leon-Rot at ten years old. She was 3rd at the 2017 Italian International Ladies Championship, and won the 2018 English Girls' Open Amateur Stroke Play Championship, the first non-English winner of the event. With her national team, Sattelkau finished 3rd at the 2022 Espirito Santo Trophy alongside Helen Briem and Alexandra Försterling, and played on the winning team at the 2024 European Ladies' Team Championship.

Sattelkau attended Vanderbilt University from 2019 to 2024, and played on the Vanderbilt Commodores women's golf team, where she earned All-American and First Team All-SEC honors.

== Professional career ==
Sattelkau turned professional in 2024 and joined the 2025 Ladies European Tour after securing conditional status at Q-School. In her rookie season, she recorded a top-10 finish at the VP Bank Swiss Ladies Open in Switzerland.

In 2026, she joined the Sunshine Ladies Tour, where she won the SuperSport Ladies Challenge and NTT Data Ladies Pro-Am back-to-back in February.

== Amateur wins ==
- 2018 English Girls' Open Amateur Stroke Play Championship

== Professional wins (2) ==
=== Sunshine Ladies Tour wins (2) ===
No.	Date	Tournament	Winning score	To par	Margin of victory	Runner-up
1	6 Feb 2026	SuperSport Ladies Challenge	69-75-69=213	−3	Playoff	(South Africa) Casandra Alexander
2	16 Feb 2026	NTT Data Ladies Pro-Am	67-72=139	−7	5 strokes	(Germany) Sophie Witt

Sunshine Ladies Tour playoff record (1–0)

No.	Year	Tournament	Opponent	Result
1	2026	SuperSport Ladies Challenge	(South Africa) Casandra Alexander	Won with par on sixth extra hole

== Team appearances ==
Amateur

- European Girls' Team Championship (representing Germany): 2017, 2018, 2019
- European Ladies' Team Championship (representing Germany): 2022, 2023, 2024 (winners)
- Espirito Santo Trophy (representing Germany): 2022, 2023
- Patsy Hankins Trophy (representing Europe): 2023 (winners)
