= Sophie Witt =

German professional golfer

Personal information
- Nationality: Germany
- Born: 12 November 2002 (age 23) Velbert, Germany
- Height: 5 ft 6 in (1.68 m)

Career
- Sport: Golf
- Turned professional: 2022
- Current tours: Ladies European Tour (joined 2022); Sunshine Ladies Tour (joined 2026)
- Former tour: LET Access Series (joined 2025)

Achievements and awards
- Düsseldorf Junior Athlete of the Year: 2020

Sophie Witt (born 12 November 2002) is a German professional golfer and Ladies European Tour player. As an amateur she won the 2020 European Girls' Team Championship.

== Amateur career ==
Witt started playing golf in 2008 and is based at Golf Club Hubbelrath near Düsseldorf. Her mentors include fellow Hubbelrathian Sandra Gal and footballer Lars Bender, whom she met at a pro-am.

Witt joined the German National Team in 2018, and won the bronze at the 2018 European Young Masters with the mixed German team. She finished tied 4th at the 2018 Irish Girls U18 Open Stroke Play Championship at Roganstown Golf Club, five strokes behind winner Kajsa Arwefjäll.

In 2020, Witt won the German National Girls Championship (U18) at Fürstlicher Golf Club Oberschwaben. She also won the 2020 European Girls' Team Championship in Hrubá Borša, Slovakia together with Charlotte Back, Chiara Horder and Paula Schulz-Hanssen. In the final against Sweden Witt halved her game against Meja Örtengren for a final scoreline of 2.5 to 0.5 in Germany's favor.

== Professional career ==
Witt turned professional in early 2022 after finishing tied 12th at the LET Q-School, which earned her a spot on the 2022 Ladies European Tour. In only her second LET start as a professional she shared the lead after the first round at the Aramco Saudi Ladies International, and ultimately finished in a tie for 10th. Her best finish in her rookie season was a tie for 3rd at the Big Green Egg Open, two strokes behind winner Anna Nordqvist.

In 2023, she recorded several top-10s and again came close to securing a maiden title at the VP Bank Swiss Ladies Open, where she shared the lead with compatriot Alexandra Försterling after the 17th hole in the final round, but after dropping a shot on her final hole ultimately finished in a tie for 3rd.

In 2026, Witt joined the Sunshine Ladies Tour, where she was runner-up at the NTT Data Ladies Pro-Am behind compatriot Celina Sattelkau. She finished the season 3rd in the Order of Merit, behind only Sattelkau and Casandra Alexander.

== Amateur wins ==
- 2017 GVNRW-Ranglistenturnier 1
- 2018 GVNRW-Ranglistenturnier 1
- 2020 German National Girls Championship

== Team appearances ==
Amateur

- European Young Masters (representing Germany): 2018
- European Girls' Team Championship (representing Germany): 2019, 2020 (winners)
- European Ladies' Team Championship (representing Germany): 2021
