= Aline Krauter =

German professional golfer (born 1999)

Personal information
- Nationality: Germany
- Born: 30 December 1999 (age 26) Stuttgart, Germany
- Height: 5 ft 3 in (160 cm)

Career
- Sport: Golf
- College: Stanford University
- Turned professional: 2022
- Current tours: LPGA Tour (joined 2023); Ladies European Tour (joined 2023)
- Professional wins: 1

Number of wins by tour
- Ladies European Tour: 1

Best results in LPGA major championships
- Chevron Championship: CUT: 2021, 2023
- Women's PGA C'ship: T66: 2024
- U.S. Women's Open: T28: 2025
- Women's British Open: CUT: 2021, 2025
- Evian Championship: T43: 2025

Achievements and awards
- Dinah Shore Trophy Award: 2022

Aline Krauter (born 30 December 1999) is a German professional golfer. She won The Women's Amateur Championship in 2020, and the NCAA Division I Women's Golf Championships with Stanford in 2022.

== Early life and education ==
Krauter hails from Stuttgart and was educated at Saddlebrook Prep in Florida.

== Amateur career ==
Krauter won the 2016 German Girls Open and finished third at the 2018 Portuguese Ladies Amateur. She won the 2020 Women's Amateur Championship at West Lancashire Golf Club in England, 1 up, over home player Annabell Fuller. She became only the second German to do so, following Leonie Harm in 2018.

Krauter represented Germany at the 2016 World Junior Girls Championship in Canada and at seven European Team Championships between 2016 and 2022, winning silver at the 2020 European Ladies' Team Championship in Uppsala, Sweden alongside Alexandra Försterling and Paula Schulz-Hanssen.

Krauter accepted a golf scholarship to Stanford University and played with the Stanford Cardinal women's golf team between 2018 and 2022, and was a four-time All-American. In 2020, her fall quarter of college golf was canceled due to the COVID-19 pandemic. While other conferences forged on, the Pac-12 Conference did not compete. Krauter was in the original 2020 Arnold Palmer Cup team announced in March 2020, but was dropped when the new lineups were presented for the postponed event in December.

As the reigning Women's Amateur champion, Krauter was invited to both the 2021 Augusta National Women's Amateur and the 2021 ANA Inspiration. The tournaments were played on the same dates so she chose to play the ANA Inspiration, where she was the only amateur in the field. She finished 3rd in the 2021 U.S. Open Collegiate Invitational.

In 2022, Krauter graduated with a degree in International Relations and received the Dinah Shore Trophy Award. She ended her amateur career a key player on the Stanford team triumphing in the NCAA Division I Women's Golf Championships, and won the Arnold Palmer Cup.

== Professional career ==
Krauter turned professional in August 2022. She made her professional debut in September at the LPGA Tour's Dana Open, where she finished tied 29th.

She earned her 2023 cards for the LPGA Tour and the Ladies European Tour via Q-School.

Krauter earned her first professional tournament win at the 2023 Hero Women's Indian Open on the Ladies European Tour.

== Amateur wins ==
- 2016 German Girls Open
- 2020 The Women's Amateur Championship

== Professional wins (1) ==
=== Ladies European Tour wins (1) ===
| No. | Date | Tournament | Winning score | To par | Margin of victory | Runner-up |
|---|---|---|---|---|---|---|
| 1 | 22 Oct 2023 | Hero Women's Indian Open | 69-68-68-68=273 | −15 | 5 strokes | (Sweden) Sara Kjellker |

== Results in LPGA majors ==
Results not in chronological order.

| Tournament | 2021 | 2022 | 2023 | 2024 | 2025 | 2026 |
|---|---|---|---|---|---|---|
| Chevron Championship | CUT | | CUT | | | |
| U.S. Women's Open | CUT | | CUT | | T28 | |
| Women's PGA Championship | | | CUT | T66 | CUT | 69 |
| The Evian Championship | CUT | CUT | | | T43 | |
| Women's British Open | CUT | | | | CUT | |

Did not play

CUT = missed the half-way cut
T = tied

== Team appearances ==
- World Junior Girls Championship (representing Germany): 2016
- European Girls' Team Championship (representing Germany): 2016, 2017
- European Ladies' Team Championship (representing Germany): 2018, 2019, 2020, 2021, 2022
- Arnold Palmer Cup (representing the International Team): 2022 (winners)
