= Anna Foster (golfer) =

Irish professional golfer (born 2001)

Personal information
- Nationality: Ireland
- Born: 2001 (age 24–25) Dublin, Ireland
- Height: 172 cm (5 ft 8 in)

Career
- Sport: Golf
- College: Auburn University
- Turned professional: 2024
- Current tour: Ladies European Tour (joined 2025)
- Professional wins: 1

Best results in LPGA major championships
- Chevron Championship: DNP
- Women's PGA C'ship: DNP
- U.S. Women's Open: DNP
- Women's British Open: CUT: 2023, 2025, 2026
- Evian Championship: DNP

Achievements and awards
- Irish Girls Order of Merit Winner: 2019

Anna Foster (born 2001) is an Irish professional golfer and Ladies European Tour player.

== Early life and amateur career ==
Foster was born in Dublin and began playing golf at age seven alongside her twin brother. At 10, she started to take the game more seriously, and at 13 she decided to stop playing other sports to focus on golf.

She won the 2021 Irish Women's Amateur Close Championship and the 2024 Irish Women's Amateur Open Championship, and represented Ireland around the world over a dozen times including at the 2022 Espirito Santo Trophy at Le Golf National in Paris. She won three Home Internationals with Ireland and finished 4th at the 2024 European Ladies' Team Championship.

Foster attended Auburn University from 2020 to 2024 and played with the Auburn Tigers women's golf team. She was named All-American once and named to the All-SEC Team twice.

== Professional career ==
Foster graduated from university in 2024 and turned professional that summer. She joined the 2025 Ladies European Tour (LET) after finishing tied 6th at LET Q-School in December.

In her rookie LET season, Foster tied for fourth at the Amundi German Masters, and qualified for the 2025 Women's British Open.

In 2026, Foster came close to securing her maiden LET victory at the VP Bank Swiss Ladies Open, where she finished runner-up a stroke behind Eleanor Givens of England.

== Amateur wins ==
- 2018 East Leinster Girls Championship
- 2021 Irish Women's Amateur Close Championship
- 2024 Irish Women's Amateur Open Championship

== Professional wins (1) ==
=== Other wins (1) ===
- 2024 Maryland State Women's Open

== Results in LPGA majors ==
Tournament	2023	2024	2025	2026
Chevron Championship				
U.S. Women's Open				
Women's PGA Championship				
The Evian Championship				
Women's British Open	CUT		CUT	CUT

Did not play

CUT = missed the half-way cut

== Team appearances ==
Amateur

- Girls Home Internationals (representing Ireland): 2018 (winners), 2019
- European Girls' Team Championship (representing Ireland): 2019
- Spirit International Amateur (representing Ireland): 2019
- World Junior Girls Championship (representing Ireland): 2019
- Women's Home Internationals (representing Ireland): 2021
- European Ladies' Team Championship (representing Ireland): 2021, 2022, 2023, 2024
- Women's and Men's Home Internationals (representing Ireland): 2022 (women's winners), 2024 (winners)
- Espirito Santo Trophy (representing Ireland): 2022
