= Anna Backman =

Finnish professional golfer (born 1999)

Personal information
- Nationality: Finland
- Born: 23 March 1999 (age 27) Lahti, Finland
- Height: 172 cm (5 ft 8 in)

Career
- Sport: Golf
- College: University of Miami
- Turned professional: 2024
- Current tour: LET Access Series (joined 2024)
- Professional wins: 1

Anna Backman (born 23 March 1999) is a Finnish professional golfer. She won the 2025 Ladies Slovak Golf Open on the LET Access Series.

== Amateur career ==
Backman grew up in Vääksy near Lahti and started playing golf at the age of 6. In 2013, she won the Finnish Women's Amateur a stroke ahead of Sanna Nuutinen. She enjoyed success across Europe, winning the 2015 French International Ladies Amateur Championship at Morfontaine, and finished third at the 2016 Duke of York Young Champions Trophy held at Royal Birkdale. In 2017, she reached the semi-finals of The Women's Amateur Championship, where she fell to the eventual champion Leona Maguire, 3 and 2.

In one of her first starts in a professional event, she was runner up at the 2019 Ladies Finnish Open behind Nina Pegova.

Backman enrolled at the University of Miami in 2018 and graduated in December 2022 with a bachelor's degree in psychology. She recorded two individual titles playing with the Miami Hurricanes women's golf team and was named ACC Golfer of the Month.

== Professional career ==
Backman turned professional in 2024 and joined the LET Access Series. She secured her maiden professional title at the 2025 Ladies Slovak Golf Open.

== Amateur wins ==
- 2013 Finnish Women's Amateur
- 2015 Skandia Junior Open, French International Ladies Amateur Championship
- 2016 Finnish Junior Match Play U18
- 2017 FJT Invitational, Audi Finnish Tour #1, Finnish Stroke Play Championship U18 & U21
- 2018 Audi Finnish PGA Golf Tour Final
- 2019 UCF Challenge
- 2020 Allstate Sugar Bowl Intercollegiate
- 2023 Finnish PGA Golf Tour Final

== Professional wins (1) ==
=== LET Access Series wins (1) ===
No.	Date	Tournament	Winning score	To par	Margin of victory	Runner-up
1	15 Aug 2025	Ladies Slovak Golf Open	69-71-72=212	−4	2 strokes	(Czech Republic) Jana Melichová

== Team appearances ==
Amateur

- European Young Masters (representing Finland): 2014
- World Junior Girls Championship (representing Finland): 2015, 2016
- Duke of York Young Champions Trophy (representing Finland): 2016
- European Girls' Team Championship (representing Finland): 2014, 2015, 2016, 2017
- European Ladies' Team Championship (representing Finland): 2018, 2019, 2021, 2022
- Espirito Santo Trophy (representing Finland): 2018, 2022
