= Carla Tejedo Mulet =

Spanish professional golfer (born 2002)

Personal information
- Nationality: Spain
- Born: 4 December 2001 (age 24) Castellón de la Plana, Spain
- Height: 5 ft 4 in (163 cm)

Career
- Sport: Golf
- College: Louisiana State University
- Turned professional: 2024
- Current tour: LPGA Tour (joined 2026)
- Former tour: Epson Tour (joined 2025)

Best results in LPGA major championships
- Chevron Championship: CUT: 2026
- Women's PGA C'ship: CUT: 2026
- U.S. Women's Open: DNP
- Women's British Open: T23: 2026
- Evian Championship: CUT: 2026

Achievements and awards
- All-Louisiana Freshman of the Year: 2021
- All-NCAA Championship Team: 2024

Carla Tejedo Mulet (born 4 December 2001) is a Spanish professional golfer and LPGA Tour player. She won the 2022 World University Golf Championship and the 2023 European Ladies' Team Championship.

== Amateur career ==
Tejedo was on the Spanish national team and led her team to a second-place finish at the 2019 European Girls' Team Championship, after a final loss to Denmark. In the European Ladies' Team Championship, her team won bronze in 2022 and gold in 2023, after beating England 4 1/2–2 1/2 in the final.

In 2022, she won the World University Golf Championship in Italy, two strokes ahead of compatriot Carolina Lopez-Chacarra Coto. She reached the quarterfinals of the 2019 Girls Amateur Championship, tied for 3rd at the 2020 Portuguese Ladies Amateur, and tied for 8th in 2023 and 6th in 2024 at the European Ladies Amateur.

Tejedo was enrolled at Louisiana State University (LSU) from 2021 to 2024, and played with the LSU Lady Tigers golf team. She was part of 10 team wins, and after a top-10 individual finish at the 2024 NCAA Championship, she was named to the All-NCAA Championship Team.

== Professional career ==
Tejedo turned professional in 2024 and joined the 2025 Epson Tour, after earning status at Q-School.

In her rookie season, she was runner-up at the Copper Rock Championship, a stroke behind Gina Kim and finished 14th in the rankings to graduate to the LPGA Tour for 2026.

== Personal life ==
Her four years younger sister Rocío is also an accomplished golfer, who has played for Spain and LSU.

== Amateur wins ==
- 2017 Campeonato Absoluto Comunidad Valenciana, Copa de la Comunidad Valenciana, Campeonato de Club Panoramica Golf
- 2018 Grand Prix des Landes
- 2019 Copa Andalucia
- 2021 Jackson T. Stephens Cup
- 2022 World University Golf Championship

== Results in LPGA majors ==
Tournament	2026
Chevron Championship	CUT
U.S. Women's Open	
Women's PGA Championship	CUT
The Evian Championship	CUT
Women's British Open	T23

Did not play

CUT = missed the half-way cut
"T" = tied

== Team appearances ==
Amateur

- Junior Golf World Cup (representing Spain): 2019
- European Girls' Team Championship (representing Spain): 2019
- World Junior Girls Championship (representing Spain): 2019
- European Ladies' Team Championship (representing Spain): 2021, 2022, 2023, 2024
