= Patricie Macková =

Czech professional golfer (born 2002)

Personal information
- Nickname: Mack
- Nationality: Czech Republic
- Born: 7 April 2002 (age 24) Prague, Czech Republic

Career
- Sport: Golf
- College: University of Maryland
- Turned professional: 2024
- Current tours: Ladies European Tour (joined 2025); LET Access Series (joined 2024)
- Professional wins: 1

Patricie Macková (born 7 April 2002) is a Czech professional golfer and Ladies European Tour player. She won the 2025 Lavaux Ladies Open on the LET Access Series.

== Early life and amateur career ==
Macková was born in Prague and began playing golf when she was seven years old, introduced by her grandfather. She became a member of the Czech National Team in 2017, and represented her country at the European Girls' Team Championship three times. She also appeared twice in the European Ladies' Team Championship and the Espirito Santo Trophy. She won the 2023 Patsy Hankins Trophy with Europe at La Manga Club.

In 2020, Macková enrolled at the University of Maryland and joined the Maryland Terrapins women's golf team, where she was an All-American.

Macková tied for 4th at the 2022 European Ladies Amateur alongside Lottie Woad, and tied for 6th at the Czech Ladies Challenge in 2019, 4th in 2022, and 3rd in 2023.

== Professional career ==
Macková turned professional after graduating in 2024 and joined the LET Access Series. She finished 41st at Q-School to earn conditional Ladies European Tour (LET) status for 2025.

In 2025, Macková made six straight cuts on the LET, and won the Lavaux Ladies Open in Switzerland, three strokes ahead of Justice Bosio from Australia.

== Amateur wins ==
- 2017 Leone Di San Marco, Faldo Series Slovakia Championship
- 2019 Czech International Junior U18 & 21 Championship
- 2022 Yale Invitational
- 2023 Lady Buckeye Invitational

== Professional wins (1) ==
=== LET Access Series wins (1) ===
No.	Date	Tournament	Winning score	To par	Margin of victory	Runner-up
1	19 Sep 2025	Lavaux Ladies Open	67-71-67=205	−11	3 strokes	(Australia) Justice Bosio

== Team appearances ==
Amateur

- European Girls' Team Championship (representing Czech Republic): 2017, 2018, 2019
- Duke of York Young Champions Trophy (representing Czech Republic): 2017, 2019
- World Junior Girls Championship (representing Czech Republic): 2018
- European Ladies' Team Championship (representing Czech Republic): 2022, 2023
- Espirito Santo Trophy (representing Czech Republic): 2022, 2023
- Patsy Hankins Trophy (representing Europe): 2023 (winners)
