= 2022 European Ladies' Team Championship =

Golf competition

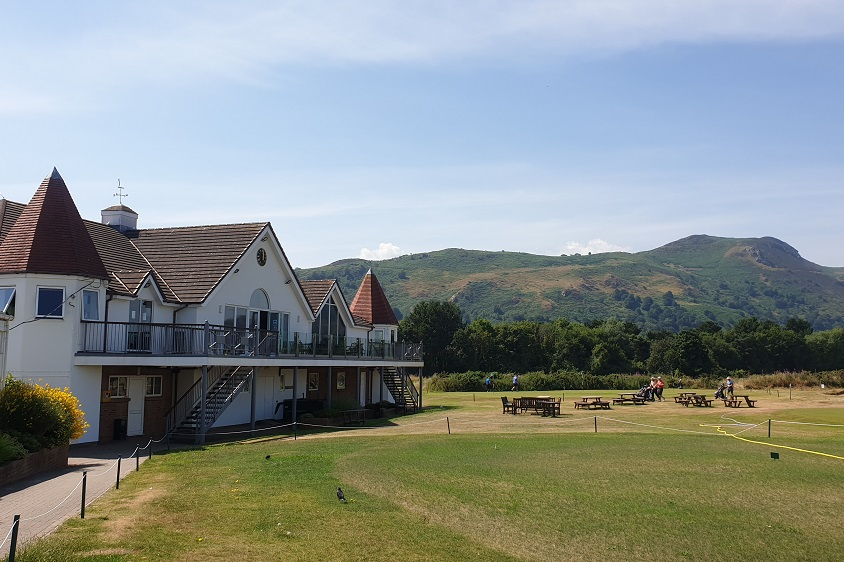
- Clubhouse at Conwy Golf Club

Tournament information
- Dates: 5–9 July 2022
- Location: Conwy, Wales, United Kingdom; 53.2912°N 3.8435°W
- Course: Conwy Golf Club
- Organised by: European Golf Association
- Format: 36 holes stroke play Knock-out match-play

Statistics
- Par: 73
- Length: 6,624 yards (6,057 m)
- Field: 20 teams 120 players

Champion
- England; Rosie Belsham, Annabell Fuller, Charlotte Heath, Caley McGinty, Amelia Williamson, Lottie Woad
- Qualification round: 372 (+7); Final match 4.5–2.5
- Location in Europe Location on the British Isles Location in Wales

The 2022 European Ladies' Team Championship took place 5–9 July at Conwy Golf Club in Conwy County Borough, Wales, United Kingdom. It was the 39th women's golf amateur European Ladies' Team Championship.

== Venue ==
Conwy Golf Club was formed in 1890. Its links course in Conwy County Borough, on the north coast of Wales, was designed by Jack Morris, club professional at Royal Liverpool Golf Club and nephew of Old Tom Morris, the first nine holes in 1875 and additional nine holes in 1895.

The club previously hosted the 2021 Curtis Cup and the men's 2009 European Amateur Team Championship.

=== Course layout ===
The scorecard shows the maximum hole lengths of the championship course set up. The length varied.

| Hole | Yards | Par | Hole | Yards | Par |
|---|---|---|---|---|---|
| 1 | 368 | 4 | 10 | 547 | 5 |
| 2 | 161 | 3 | 11 | 376 | 4 |
| 3 | 378 | 4 | 12 | 494 | 5 |
| 4 | 368 | 4 | 13 | 182 | 3 |
| 5 | 455 | 5 | 14 | 484 | 5 |
| 6 | 167 | 3 | 15 | 139 | 3 |
| 7 | 428 | 4 | 16 | 400 | 4 |
| 8 | 404 | 4 | 17 | 391 | 4 |
| 9 | 506 | 5 | 18 | 376 | 4 |
| Out | 3,235 | 36 | In | 3,389 | 37 |
| Source: | | Total | | 6,624 | 73 |

== Format ==
Each nation team consisted of six players. On the first two days each player played 18 holes of stroke play each day. The lowest five scores from each team's six players counted to the team total each day.

The eight best teams formed flight A, in knock-out match-play over the following three days. The teams were seeded based on their positions after the stroke play. The first placed team to play the quarter-final against the eight placed team, the second against the seventh, the third against the sixth and the fourth against the fifth. Teams were allowed to use six players during the team matches, selecting four of them in the two morning foursome games and five players in to the afternoon single games. Teams knocked out after the quarter-finals played one foursome game and four single games in each of their remaining matches. Extra holes were played in games that were all square after 18 holes. However, if the result of the team match were already decided, games are declared halved.

The eight teams placed 9-16 in the stroke-play stage formed flight B to also play knock-out match-play, but with one foursome game and four single games in each match, to decide their final positions.

The four teams placed 17-20 in the stroke-play stage formed flight C, to meet each other with one foursome game and four single games in each match, to decide their final positions.

== Teams ==
20 nation teams contested the event. Each team consisted of six players.

Players in the participating teams

| Country | Players |
|---|---|
| Austria | Chantal Duringer, Johanna Ebner, Laura Fangmeyer, Isabella Holpfer, Anna Neumayer, Emma Spitz |
| Belgium | Margaux Appart, Rebecca Becht, Sophie Bert, Elise Bishop, Clarisse Louis, Celine Manche |
| Czech Republic | Anna Andtysova, Patricie Macková, Nathalie Saint Germain, Karolina Stara, Agata Vahalova, Denisa Vodickova |
| Denmark | Amalie Leth-Nissen, Cecilie Leth-Nissen, Cecilie Finne-Ipsen, Natacha Høst Husted, Olivia Grønborg Skousen, Sofie Kibsgaard Nielsen |
| England | Rosie Belsham, Annabell Fuller, Charlotte Heath, Caley McGinty, Amelia Williamson, Lottie Woad |
| Finland | Krista Junkkari, Anna Backman, Tia Teiniketo, Katri Bakker, Henni Mustonen, Oona Kuronen |
| France | Gala Dumez, Justine Fournand, Marine Griffaut, Lois Lau, Candice Mahé, Chloé Salort |
| Germany | Alexandra Försterling, Chiara Horder, Viktoria Hund, Aline Krauter, Celina Sattelkau, Paula Schulz-Hanssen |
| Iceland | Andrea Bergsdottir, Hulda Clara Gestsdottir, Heidrun Anna Hlynsdottir, Johanna Lea Ludviksdottir, Perla Sol Sigurbrandsdottir, Saga Traustadottir, |
| Ireland | Sara Byrne, Beth Coulter, Aine Donegan, Anna Foster, Kate Lanigan, Lauren Walsh |
| Italy | Alessandra Fanali, Carolina Melgrati, Benedetta Moresco, Alessia Nobilio, Emilie Alba Paltrinieri, Anna Zanusso |
| Netherlands | Anne Sterre Den Dunnen, Lauren Holmey, Mayka Hoogeboom, Hester Sicking, Danique Stokmans, Noa Van Beek |
| Poland | Maja Ambroziak, Matylda Krawczyńska, Kinga Kuśmierska, Nina Pitsch, Nicole Polivchak, Dorota Zalewska |
| Scotland | Hannah Darling, Louise Duncan, Lorna McClymont, Chloe Goadby, Grace Crawford, Jennifer Saxton |
| Slovakia | Laila Hrindova, Alexandra Malikova, Laura Posova, Elena Maria Tarabova, Michaela Vávrová, Antonia Zacharovska |
| Slovenia | Barbara Car, Inja Fric, Iza Bela Ivanko, Lara Jecnik, Lana Malek, Neza Siftar |
| Spain | Marina Escobar Domingo, Blanca Fernández, Carolina López-Chacarra, Lucia Lopez Ortega, Julia López Ramirez, Carla Tejedo Mulet |
| Sweden | Anna Nordfors, Andrea Lignell, Louise Rydqvist, Ingrid Lindblad, Elsa Svensson, Kajsa Arwefjäll |
| Switzerland | Nathalie Armbrüster, Ginnie Lee, Victoria Levy, Elena Moosmann, Caroline Sturdza, Chiara Tamburlini |
| Wales | Darcey Harry, Harriet Lockley, Gracie Mayo, Ellen Nicholas, Kath O’Connor, Ffion Tynan |

== Winners ==
Defending champions team England lead the opening 36-hole qualifying competition, with a 22 over par score of 752, three strokes ahead of team Denmark.

Individual leader in the 36-hole stroke-play competition was, as well as at last years championship, Hannah Darling, Scotland, with a score of 6 under par 140, two strokes ahead of Emma Spitz, Austria.

Team England won the championship, beating Italy 4 1/2–2 1/2 in the final and earned their twelfth title. With the win, England increased its lead as the nation with most wins in the history of the championship, two more than Sweden.

Team Spain earned third place, beating Sweden 4-3 in the bronze match.

== Results ==
Qualification round

Team standings after first round

| Place | Country | Score | To par |
|---|---|---|---|
| T1 | Germany | 372 | +7 |
| T1 | England | 372 | +7 |
| T1 | Sweden | 372 | +7 |
| T4 | Denmark | 377 | +12 |
| T4 | France | 377 | +12 |
| 6 | Austria | 378 | +13 |
| 7 | Switzerland | 380 | +15 |
| T8 | Italy | 381 | +16 |
| T8 | Wales | 381 | +16 |
| T8 | Spain | 381 | +16 |
| T8 | Scotland | 381 | +16 |
| 12 | Netherlands | 385 | +20 |
| 13 | Ireland | 386 | +21 |
| T14 | Finland | 388 | +23 |
| T14 | Czech Republic | 388 | +23 |
| 16 | Iceland | 390 | +25 |
| 17 | Slovenia | 391 | +26 |
| 18 | Belgium | 396 | +31 |
| 19 | Poland | 400 | +35 |
| 20 | Slovakia | 413 | +48 |

Team standings after final qualifying round

| Place | Country | Score | To par |
|---|---|---|---|
| 1 | England | 372-380=752 | +22 |
| 2 | Denmark | 377-378=755 | +25 |
| 3 | Germany | 372-387=759 | +29 |
| 4 | Scotland | 381-379=760 | +30 |
| 5 | Sweden | 372-390=762 | +32 |
| 6 | Italy | 381-383=764 | +34 |
| 7 | Spain | 381-385=766 | +36 |
| 8 | Wales | 381-386=767 | +37 |
| 9 | Austria | 378-399=777 | +47 |
| 10 | Netherlands | 385-393=778 | +48 |
| 11 | France * | 377-402=779 | +49 |
| 12 | Switzerland | 380-399=779 | +49 |
| 13 | Ireland | 386-396=782 | +52 |
| 14 | Czech Republic | 388-396=784 | +54 |
| 15 | Iceland | 390-396=786 | +56 |
| 16 | Finland | 388-403=791 | +61 |
| 17 | Slovenia | 391-403=794 | +64 |
| 18 | Belgium | 396-405=801 | +71 |
| 19 | Poland | 400-419=819 | +89 |
| 20 | Slovakia | 413-416=829 | +99 |

* Note: In the event of a tie the order was determined by the
best total of the two non-counting scores of the two rounds.

Individual leaders

| Place | Player | Country | Score | To par |
|---|---|---|---|---|
| 1 | Hannah Darling | Scotland | 70-70=140 | −6 |
| 2 | Emma Spitz | Austria | 71-71=142 | −4 |
| 3 | Amalie Leth-Nissen | Denmark | 70-76=146 | E |
| T4 | Charlotte Heath | England | 74-73=147 | +1 |
| T4 | Ingrid Lindblad | Sweden | 72-75=147 | +1 |
| 6 | Chiara Horder | Germany | 72-76=148 | +2 |
| T7 | Mayka Hoogeboom | Netherlands | 73-76=149 | +3 |
| T7 | Harriet Lockley | Wales | 75-74=149 | +3 |
| T7 | Carolina Lopez Chacarra | Spain | 75-74=149 | +3 |
| T7 | Amelia Williamson | England | 73-76=149 | +3 |
| T7 | Anna Zanusso | Italy | 76-73=149 | +3 |

Note: There was no official award for the lowest individual score.

Flight A

Bracket

Quarter finals
England | 7
Wales | 0
Sweden | 4
Scotland | 3
Italy | 5
Germany | 2
Spain | 4.5
Denmark | 2.5

Semi finals
England | 4.5
Sweden | 2.5
Italy | 5.5
Spain | 1.5

Final
England | 4.5
Italy | 2.5
Bronze match
Spain | 4
Sweden | 3

Elimination matches
Scotland | 3
Wales | 2
Denmark | 3.5
Germany | 1.5

Match for 5th place
Denmark | 4
Scotland | 1
Match for 7th place
Germany | 3
Wales | 2

Final games

| England | Italy |
| 4.5 | 2.5 |
| C. Heath / A. Williamson | A. Fanali / A. Zanusso 2 & 1 |
| C. McGinty / L. Woad 2 & 1 | B. Moresco / E. A. Paltrinieri |
| Amelia Williamson 3 & 2 | Carolina Melgrati |
| Caley McGintey | Alesssia Nobilio 3 & 1 |
| Lottie Woad 2 & 1 | Benedetta Moresco |
| Rosie Belsham AS * | Alessandra Fanali AS * |
| Charlotte Heath 4 & 3 | Emelie Alba Paltrineri |

* Note: Game declared halved, since team match already decided.

Flight B

Bracket

Round 1
Austria | 4
Finland | 1
Ireland | 3
Switzerland | 2
France | 3.5
Czech Republic | 1.5
Netherlands | 4
Iceland | 1

Round 2
Ireland | 4
Austria | 1
France | 4.5
Netherlands | 0.5

Match for 9th place
France | 4
Ireland | 1
Match for 11th place
Austria | 3
Netherlands | 2

Elimination matches
Switzerland | 3
Finland | 2
Czech Republic | 4.5
Iceland | 0.5

Match for 13th place
Switzerland | 4
Czech Republic | 1
Match for 15th place
Finland | 3
Iceland | 2

Flight C

Team matches

| 1 | Slovenia | Slovakia | 0 |
| 3.5 | | 1.5 | |

| 1 | Belgium | Poland | 0 |
| 3 | | 2 | |

| 1 | Slovenia | Poland | 0 |
| 4 | | 1 | |

| 1 | Belgium | Slovakia | 0 |
| 5 | | 0 | |

| 1 | Belgium | Slovenia | 0 |
| 3 | | 2 | |

| 1 | Poland | Slovakia | 0 |
| 2.5 | | 2.5 | |

Team standings

| Country | Place | W | T | L | Game points | Points |
|---|---|---|---|---|---|---|
| Belgium | 17 | 3 | 0 | 0 | 12–3 | 3 |
| Slovenia | 18 | 2 | 0 | 1 | 8.5–6.5 | 2 |
| Poland | 19 | 0 | 1 | 2 | 5.5–9.5 | 0.5 |
| Slovakia | 20 | 0 | 1 | 2 | 4–11 | 0.5 |

Final standings

| Place | Country |
|---|---|
| 1st place, gold medalist(s) | England |
| 2nd place, silver medalist(s) | Italy |
| 3rd place, bronze medalist(s) | Spain |
| 4 | Sweden |
| 5 | Denmark |
| 6 | Scotland |
| 7 | Germany |
| 8 | Wales |
| 9 | France |
| 10 | Ireland |
| 11 | Austria |
| 12 | Netherlands |
| 13 | Switzerland |
| 14 | Czech Republic |
| 15 | Finland |
| 16 | Iceland |
| 17 | Belgium |
| 18 | Slovenia |
| 19 | Poland |
| 20 | Slovakia |

== See also ==
- Espirito Santo Trophy – biennial world amateur team golf championship for women organized by the International Golf Federation.
- European Amateur Team Championship – European amateur team golf championship for men organised by the European Golf Association.
- European Ladies Amateur Championship – European amateur individual golf championship for women organised by the European Golf Association.
