= Caley McGinty =

English professional golfer (born 2000)

Personal information
- Nationality: England
- Born: 25 September 2000 (age 26) Bristol, England

Career
- Sport: Golf
- College: Kent State University; Oklahoma State University; Ohio State University
- Turned professional: 2024
- Current tours: LPGA Tour (joined 2025); Ladies European Tour (joined 2026)

Best results in LPGA major championships
- Chevron Championship: DNP
- Women's PGA C'ship: DNP
- U.S. Women's Open: CUT: 2025
- Women's British Open: CUT: 2022
- Evian Championship: DNP

Achievements and awards
- Mid-American Conference Freshman of the Year: 2021
- Mid-American Conference Golfer of the Year: 2021

Caley McGinty (born 25 September 2000) is an English professional golfer who plays on the LPGA Tour and Ladies European Tour. She was runner-up at the 2026 Australian Women's Classic. As an amateur she won the European Ladies' Team Championship in 2021 and 2022.

== Early life ==
McGinty was born in Bristol in 2000 and she started playing golf at 7 years old, when she picked up a set of clubs at the encouragement of her brother. She was educated at Oasis Academy Brislington.

== Amateur career ==
McGinty represented England in amateur golf between 2019 and 2024, including playing in the Curtis Cup and Espirito Santo Trophy twice, and winning the European Ladies' Team Championship twice, in 2021 and 2022. She won her singles match against Beatrice Wallin in the 2021 final by 6 and 5.

McGinty played college golf for two years at Kent State University from 2019 to 2021. In 2021, she won the Mid-American Conference Championship and was named Mid-American Conference Freshman of the Year and Mid-American Conference Golfer of the Year. She transferred to Oklahoma State University for the 2021–22 season and took Maja Stark's place on the team after the coach that recruited her to Kent State became the new head coach at Oklahoma State. She then spent the next two seasons at Ohio State University where she was named All-American and 2024 OSU Scholar Athlete.

McGinty made her major debut at the 2022 Women's British Open as the highest ranked women in the World Amateur Golf Ranking from Great Britain and Ireland.

== Professional career ==
McGinty turned professional after graduation in mid-2024. In December 2024, she earned her LPGA Tour card for 2025 by finishing T-21 at the LPGA Final Qualifying Tournament. In her rookie season, she recorded a season-best tied 7th at the FM Championship and finished 111th in the rankings, to keep her card.

In 2026, she also joined the Ladies European Tour after earning a card at Q-School. She played the LET Australian swing, where she was runner-up at the Australian Women's Classic, four strokes behind home player Kelsey Bennett, which helped propel her into the top-200 of the Women's World Golf Rankings for the first time.

== Amateur wins ==
- 2019 The Frilford Bowl
- 2021 Sunshine Shootout, Clemson Invitational, Mid-American Conference Championship, The Schooner Fall Classic, Jim West Challenge
- 2023 Abierto Sudamericano Amateur, Westbrook Invitational
- 2024 Therese Hession Buckeye Invitational

== Results in LPGA majors ==
Tournament	2022	2023	2024	2025
Chevron Championship				
U.S. Women's Open				CUT
Women's PGA Championship				
The Evian Championship				
Women's British Open	CUT			

Did not play

CUT = missed the half-way cut

== Team appearances ==
- European Ladies' Team Championship (representing England): 2021 (winners), 2022 (winners), 2023
- Women's Home Internationals (representing England): 2021 (winners)
- Curtis Cup (representing Great Britain & Ireland): 2021, 2022
- Espirito Santo Trophy (representing England): 2022, 2023
- Arnold Palmer Cup (representing the International team): 2023
- Vagliano Trophy (representing Great Britain & Ireland): 2023
