= Julia López Ramírez =

Spanish professional golfer (born 2003)

Personal information
- Full name: Julia López Ramírez
- Nationality: Spain
- Born: 11 February 2003 (age 23) Benahavís, Málaga, Spain
- Height: 5 ft 7 in (170 cm)

Career
- Sport: Golf
- College: Mississippi State University
- Turned professional: 2024
- Current tours: LPGA Tour (joined 2025); Ladies European Tour (joined 2026)

Best results in LPGA major championships
- Chevron Championship: T45: 2026
- Women's PGA C'ship: T36: 2025
- U.S. Women's Open: T19: 2025
- Women's British Open: T29: 2024
- Evian Championship: T28: 2025

Achievements and awards
- SEC Golfer of the Year: 2023

Julia López Ramírez (born 11 February 2003) is a Spanish professional golfer and LPGA Tour player. She won the 2023 European Ladies Amateur reached number one in the World Amateur Golf Rankings in 2024.

== Amateur career ==
López was born in Málaga in 2003. In 2019, she finished third in the 2019 British Girls U16 Amateur Golf Championship. She lost the final of the 2021 Spanish International Ladies Amateur Championship at Real Club de Golf de Sevilla, 2 and 1, to compatriot Carla Bernat.

López had success with the National Team. She played on the winning Spanish team at the 2021 European Girls' Team Championship in Portugal, and won the 2023 European Ladies' Team Championship in Finland. She finished 3rd at the 2023 Espirito Santo Trophy alongside Carla Bernat and Cayetana Fernández.

She attended Mississippi State University between 2021 and 2024, and played with the Mississippi State Bulldogs women's golf team. She won eight individual titles, including back-to-back SEC Women's Golf Championship in 2023 and 2024, and was named 2023 SEC Golfer of the Year.

López won the 2023 European Ladies Amateur in Sweden after she birdied her final three holes to win by two strokes ahead of compatriot Carla Bernat, and three strokes ahead of world number one Ingrid Lindblad. The win gave her a start at the 2023 Women's British Open, where she made the cut.

She reached number one in the World Amateur Golf Rankings in July 2024.

== Professional career ==
López left college a year early and turned professional in 2024. In December 2024, she earned her LPGA Tour card for 2025 by finishing T-10 at the LPGA Final Qualifying Tournament.

Her best finish in her rookie season was a tie for third at the Women's Scottish Open and she finished 65th in the season rankings.

She earned her card for the 2026 Ladies European Tour at Q-School.

== Amateur wins ==
- 2019 "Memorial Celia Barquin" Copa Principado de Asturias
- 2020 Campeonato Femenino Puerta de Hierro
- 2021 Sam Golden Invitational
- 2022 FAU Paradise Invitational, Westbrook Invitational, Blessings Collegiate
- 2023 SEC Women's Golf Championship, NCAA Westfield Regional, European Ladies Amateur
- 2024 Darius Rucker Intercollegiate, SEC Women's Golf Championship

== Results in LPGA majors ==
Results not in chronological order.

Tournament	2023	2024	2025	2026
Chevron Championship				T45
U.S. Women's Open			T19	T60
Women's PGA Championship			T36	CUT
The Evian Championship			T28	CUT
Women's British Open	72	T29	CUT	T53

Did not play

CUT = missed the half-way cut
T = tied

=== Summary ===
Tournament	Wins	2nd	3rd	Top-5	Top-10	Top-25	Events	Cuts made
Chevron Championship	0	0	0	0	0	0	1	1
U.S. Women's Open	0	0	0	0	0	1	2	2
Women's PGA Championship	0	0	0	0	0	0	2	1
The Evian Championship	0	0	0	0	0	0	2	1
Women's British Open	0	0	0	0	0	0	4	3
Totals	0	0	0	0	0	1	11	8

- Most consecutive cuts made – 5 (2023 Women's British Open – 2025 Evian Championship)

== Team appearances ==
Amateur

- European Girls' Team Championship (representing Spain): 2020, 2021 (winners)
- European Ladies' Team Championship (representing Spain): 2022, 2023 (winners), 2024
- Arnold Palmer Cup (representing International team): 2022 (winners), 2023, 2024
- Espirito Santo Trophy (representing Spain): 2023
- Vagliano Trophy (representing Europe): 2023 (winners)

Professional

- Solheim Cup (representing Europe): 2026 (winners)

=== Solheim Cup record ===
Year	Total matches	Total W–L–H	Singles W–L–H	Foursomes W–L–H	Fourballs W–L–H	Points won	Points %
Career	2	1–0–1	1–0–0	0–0–0	0–0–1	1.5	75.0
2026	2	1–0–1	1–0–0 def. Y. Noh 3&2	0–0–0	0–0–1 halved w/ C. Ciganda	1.5	75.0
