= 2021 European Ladies' Team Championship =

Golf competition

Tournament information
- Dates: 6–10 september 2021
- Location: Newcastle, County Down, Northern Ireland; 54.218°N 5.884°W
- Course: Royal County Down Golf Club
- Organized by: European Golf Association
- Format: 36 holes stroke play Knock-out match-play

Statistics
- Par: 73
- Length: 7.011 yards (6.411 m)
- Field: 19 teams 114 players

Champion
- England; Lianna Bailey, Rosie Belsham, Annabell Fuller, Charlotte Heath, Caley McGinty, Emily Toy
- Qualification round: 750 (+20); Final match 5–2

Location map
- Location in Europe Location in British Isles Location in Ireland Location in Northern Ireland

The 2021 European Ladies' Team Championship took place 6–10 July at Royal County Down Golf Club, in Newcastle, County Down, Northern Ireland, United Kingdom It was the 38th women's golf amateur European Ladies' Team Championship.

== Venue ==
The hosting course, one of the oldest on the island of Ireland, originally designed by Old Tom Morris and located in naturally links settings in the Murlough Nature Reserve, stretching along the shores of Dundrum Bay, was established in 1889.

The course had previously hosted several editions of the Irish Open, the Senior British Open Championship, The Amateur Championship and the British Ladies Amateur Golf Championship and the 1968 Curtis Cup and the 2007 Walker Cup.

The championship course was set up with par 73 over 7,011 yards.

== Format ==
All participating teams played two qualification rounds of stroke-play with six players, counted the five best scores for each team.

The eight best teams formed flight A, in knock-out match-play over the next three days. The teams were seeded based on their positions after the stroke-play. The first placed team was drawn to play the quarter-final against the eight placed team, the second against the seventh, the third against the sixth and the fourth against the fifth. In each match between two nation teams, two 18-hole foursome games and five 18-hole single games were played. Teams were allowed to switch players during the team matches, selecting other players in to the afternoon single games after the morning foursome games. Teams knocked out after the quarter-finals played one foursome game and four single games in each of their remaining matches. Games all square after 18 holes were declared halved, if the team match was already decided.

The eight teams placed 9–16 in the qualification stroke-play formed flight B, to play similar knock-out match-play, with one foursome game and four single games, to decide their final positions.

The three teams placed 17–19 in the qualification stroke-play formed flight C, to meet each other, with one foursome game and four single games, to decide their final positions.

== Teams ==
19 nation teams contested the event. Each team consisted of six players.

Players in the leading teams

Country	Players
Austria	Chantal Düringer, Johanna Ebner, Isabella Holpfer, Amelie Svejda, Katharina Zeiling, Lea Zeitler
Czech Republic	Kristýna Frýdlová, Sára Kousková, Tereza Koželuhová, Tereza Melecká, Jana Melichová, Hana Ryšková
Denmark	Cecilie Finne-Ipsen, Sofie Kibsgaard Nielsen, Amalie Leth-Nissen, Karin Svanholm Fredgaard, Smilla Tarning Sønderby
England	Lianna Bailey, Rosie Belsham, Annabell Fuller, Charlotte Heath, Caley McGinty, Emily Toy
France	Justine Fournand, Agathe Laisné, Lois Lau, Charlotte Liautier, Lucie Malchirand, Pauline Roussin-Bouchard, Chloe Salort
Germany	Alexandra Försterling, Chiara Horder, Aline Krauter, Polly Mack, Helen Tamy Kreuzer, Sophie Witt
Iceland	Andrea Bergsdóttir, Hulda Clara Gestsdóttir, Heiðrún Anna Hlynsdóttir, Ragnhildur Kristinsdóttir, Jóhanna Lea Lúðvíksdóttir, Andrea Ýr Ásmundsdóttir
Ireland	Sara Byrne, Beth Coulter, Aine Donagan, Anna Foster, Lauren Walsh, Annabel Wilson
Italy	Emilie Alba Paltrinieri, Clara Manzalini, Carolina Melgrati, Benedetta Moresco, Alessia Nobilio, Anna Zanusso
Scotland	Hannah Darling, Louise Duncan, Chloe Goadby, Hazel MacGarvie, Lorna McClymont, Shannon McWilliam
Spain	Carla Bernat Escuder, Elena Hualde, Carolina López-Chacarra, Ana Peláez, Carla Tejedo Mulet, Maria Villanueva
Sweden	Linn Grant, Andrea Grimberg Lignell, Sara Kjellker, Ingrid Lindblad, Maja Stark, Beatrice Wallin
Switzerland	Vanessa Knecht, Ginnie Lee, Elena Moosmann, Caroline Sturdza, Chiara Tamburlini, Klara Wildhaber

Other participating teams

Country
Belgium
Finland
Netherlands
Slovakia
Slovenia
Wales

== Winners ==
Team Scotland, who never had won the championship, lead the opening 36-hole qualifying competition, with an 8 over par score of 738, ten strokes ahead of home team Ireland, combined from Northern Ireland and the Republic of Ireland. Defending champions Sweden, searching their fourth win in a row, and the Czech Republic, was another stroke back.

Individual leader in the 36-hole stroke-play competition was Hannah Darling, Scotland, with a score of 9 under par 137, three strokes ahead of Jana Melichova, Czech Republic.

Team England won the championship, beating defending champions Sweden 5–2 in the final and earned their eleventh title. With the win, England became the nation with most win in the history of the championship, one more than Sweden.

Team Italy earned third place, beating Scotland 5 1/2–1 1/2 in the bronze match.

== Results ==
Qualification round

Team standings

Place	Country	Score	To par
1	Scotland	374-364=738	+8
2	Ireland	379-369=748	+18
T3	Sweden *	378-371=749	+19
T3	Czech Republic	366-383=749	+19
5	England	375-375=750	+20
6	Denmark	375-376=751	+21
7	Italy	384-373=757	+27
8	Spain	383-376=759	+29
9	Switzerland	385-378=763	+33
10	France	385-379=764	+34
T11	Germany *	388-377=765	+35
T11	Finland	380-385=765	+35
13	Iceland	393-391=784	+54
14	Netherlands	403-388=791	+61
15	Slovakia	395-399=794	+64
16	Austria	393-403=796	+66
17	Belgium	400-397=797	+67
18	Wales	405-396=801	+71
19	Slovenia	401-416=817	+87

* Note: In the event of a tie the order was determined by the better total non-counting scores.

Individual leaders

Place	Player	Country	Score	To par
1	Hannah Darling	Scotland	68-69=137	−9
2	Jana Melichová	Czech Republic	72-68=140	−6
3	Elena Moosmann	Switzerland	71-71=142	−4
4	Amalie Leth-Nissen	Denmark	70-74=144	−2
5	Aine Donegan	Ireland	71-74=145	−1
5	Linn Grant	Sweden	71-74=145	−1
T7	Karen Fredgaard	Denmark	75-71=146	E
T7	Carolina López-Chacarra	Spain	71-75=146	E
T7	Hazel MacGarvie	Scotland	74-72=146	E
T10	Caley McGinty	England	71-76=147	+1
T10	Sophie Witt	Germany	75-72=147	+1

Note: There was no official award for the lowest individual score.

Flight A

Bracket

Quarter finals
Scotland	4
Spain	3
England	5
Czech Republic	2
Sweden	4
Denmark	3
Italy	4.5
Ireland	2.5

Semi finals
England	4
Scotland	3
Sweden	5
Italy	2

Final
England	5
Sweden	2
Bronze match
Italy	5.5
Scotland	1.5

Elimination matches
Czech Republic	3.5
Spain	1.5
Denmark	3
Ireland	2

Match for 5th place
Denmark	3
Czech Republic	2
Match for 7th place
Spain	3
Ireland	2

Final games

England	Sweden
5	2
E. Toy / C. McGinty 2 & 1	B. Wallin / S. Kjellker
A. Fuller / C. Heath	L. Grant / M. Stark 5 & 4
Emily Toy AS *	Andrea Grimberg Lignell AS *
Annabell Fuller 2 & 1	Ingrid Lindblad
Caley McGinty 6 & 5	Beatrice Wallin
Charlotte Heath 2 & 1	Maja Stark
Rosie Belsham AS *	Linn Grant AS *

* Note: Game declared halved, since team match already decided.

Flight B

Bracket

Round 1
Switzerland	5
Austria	0
Iceland	3
Finland	2
Germany	4
Netherlands	1
France	4
Slovakia	1

Round 2
Switzerland	4
Iceland	1
France	3.5
Germany	1.5

Match for 9th place
France	3.5
Switzerland	1.5
Match for 11th place
Germany	3.5
Iceland	1.5

Elimination matches
Finland	5
Austria	0
Netherlands	3
Slovakia	2

Match for 13th place
Slovakia	3
Finland	2
Match for 15th place
Netherlands	4
Austria	1

Flight C

Team matches

1	Belgium	Slovenia	0
3		2	

1	Slovenia	Wales	0
3		2	

1	Wales	Belgium	0
3		2	

Team standings

Country	Place	W	T	L	Game points	Points
Wales *	17	1	1	1	5–5	1
Slovenia *	18	1	1	1	5–5	1
Belgium	19	1	1	1	5–5	1

* Note: In the event of a tie the order was first determined by the better total number of won games and second by the better total won holes advantage.

Final standings

Place	Country
1st place, gold medalist(s)	England
2nd place, silver medalist(s)	Sweden
3rd place, bronze medalist(s)	Italy
4	Scotland
5	Denmark
6	Czech Republic
7	Spain
8	Ireland
9	France
10	Switzerland
11	Germany
12	Iceland
13	Slovakia
14	Finland
15	Netherlands
16	Austria
17	Wales
18	Slovenia
19	Belgium

== See also ==
- Espirito Santo Trophy – biennial world amateur team golf championship for women organized by the International Golf Federation.
- European Amateur Team Championship – European amateur team golf championship for men organised by the European Golf Association.
- European Ladies Amateur Championship – European amateur individual golf championship for women organised by the European Golf Association.
