= Jess Baker =

English professional golfer

Personal information
- Nationality: England
- Born: 15 March 2003 (age 23) Newcastle upon Tyne, England

Career
- Sport: Golf
- College: University of Central Florida
- Turned professional: 2024
- Current tour: Ladies European Tour (joined 2025)

Best results in LPGA major championships
- Chevron Championship: DNP
- Women's PGA C'ship: DNP
- U.S. Women's Open: CUT: 2023
- Women's British Open: CUT: 2022
- Evian Championship: CUT: 2022

Jess Baker (born 15 March 2003) is an English professional golfer from Newcastle upon Tyne, winner of the Women's Amateur Championship in 2022.

== Amateur career ==
Baker grew up in Newcastle-upon-Tyne and began playing golf at the age of eleven. She honed her skills at Northumberland Golf Club.

In 2019, she started competing internationally with the England team. Individually, she tied for third at the English Girls' Open Amateur Stroke Play Championship, the Fairhaven Trophy, and the English Women's Amateur Championship the same year.

In June 2022, she won the 119th Women's Amateur Championship at Hunstanton, where she defeated Sweden's Louise Rydqvist, 4 and 3, in the 36-hole final. This victory earned her spots in the Women's British Open at Muirfield, the U.S. Women's Open at Pebble Beach, the Evian Championship, and the Augusta National Women's Amateur Championship.

Baker enrolled at the University of Central Florida in 2020, and graduated in 2024 with a degree in psychology. She played with the UCF Knights women's golf team, and was named WGCA All-American Scholar, to the AAC All-Academic Team, and the AAC All-Conference team. She shot a 64 (−7) in the final round of the 2024 Big 12 Championship to tie the conference scoring record with Bryson DeChambeau.

== Professional career ==
Baker turned professional in 2024. She finished T36 at Q-School to secure conditional Ladies European Tour status for 2025.

== Amateur wins ==
- 2022 The Women's Amateur Championship

== Team appearances ==
Amateur

- European Girls' Team Championship (representing England): 2019
- Girls Home Internationals (representing England): 2019 (winners)
- European Ladies' Team Championship (representing England): 2023, 2024
- Women's and Men's Home Internationals (representing England): 2024
