= Amalie Leth-Nissen =

Danish professional golfer

Personal information
- Nationality: Denmark
- Born: 15 September 2004 (age 22) Copenhagen, Denmark
- Height: 5 ft 4 in (1.63 m)

Career
- Sport: Golf
- Turned professional: 2023
- Current tour: Ladies European Tour (joined 2023)
- Former tour: LET Access Series (joined 2024)
- Professional wins: 1

Achievements and awards
- DGU Junior Order of Merit: 2020, 2021

Amalie Leth-Nissen (born 15 September 2004) is a Danish professional golfer and Ladies European Tour player. She was runner-up at the 2021 Terre Blanche Ladies Open and the 2022 Smørum Ladies Open on the LET Access Series as an amateur, before winning the 2025 Terre Blanche Ladies Open.

== Early life and family ==
Leth-Nissen was born in 2004 and grew up in Herlev, a suburb of Copenhagen. She was introduced to golf by her father in 2013, when she was 8 years old.

She has three sisters, Cecilie, Marie and Sofie. Her two-year older sister Cecile is an accomplished golfer and member of the Oklahoma State Cowgirls golf team.

Leth-Nissen graduated from Lindehøjskolen in 2020 and enrolled in high school class of 2024 at Falkonergården in Frederiksberg. In 2020, she left Hjortespring Golf Club to represent Smørum Golf Club.

She is a left-handed golfer.

== Amateur career ==
Leth-Nissen had a successful amateur career and joined the National Team. Representing Denmark, she won the 2019 European Girls' Team Championship and lead her team to a third-place finish in the 2022 European Ladies' Team Championship alongside her sister Cecilie. Representing Europe, she won the 2019 Junior Vagliano Trophy and the 2021 Junior Solheim Cup.

Leth-Nissen won the stroke-play qualifying at the 2020 The Women's Amateur Championship and was the number one seed going into match-play. She claimed three birdies in her last five holes, to face her sister Cecilie in the opening last-64 tie.

In 2020, she came close to completing the domestic triple, winning the Danish National Girls Championship and the Danish National Match Play Championship, while finishing second at the Danish National Stroke Play Championship, a stroke behind Sofie Kibsgaard Nielsen and seven strokes ahead of the rest of the field.

In 2020 and 2021, she topped the Danish Golf Union Junior Order of Merit.

Leth-Nissen made two starts on the LET Access Series as an amateur. In 2021, she was solo second at the 2021 Terre Blanche Ladies Open in France, four strokes behind Linn Grant. In 2022, she finished runner-up, four strokes behind her sister Cecilie, at the Smørum Ladies Open held at her home club.

In 2022, she rose to 6th place in the World Amateur Golf Rankings after winning the French International Lady Juniors Amateur Championship and the Junior Invitational at Sage Valley. Held since 2011 for boys, Leth-Nissen won the inaugural girls' Junior Invitational and donned the prestigious gold jacket following a playoff win over Bailey Shoemaker. She also competed at the Augusta National Women's Amateur.

== Professional career ==
Leth-Nissen turned professional after securing a place on the 2023 Ladies European Tour in December 2022. She finished T13 at LET Q-School at La Manga in Spain, after at times holding the outright lead.

In her first LET start, she tied for 7th at the Magical Kenya Ladies Open, then missed 13 consecutive cuts to drop down to the LET Access Series for 2024. In 2025, she won the Terre Blanche Ladies Open and was runner-up at the Montauban Ladies Open and Västerås Ladies Open, to finish 7th in the season rankings and graduate to the LET for 2026.

== Amateur wins ==
- 2018 Molleaen Open, DGU Elite Tour III Damer & Piger
- 2019 Mons Bank Mon Open, DGU Elite Tour I Damer & Piger
- 2020 Danish National Match Play Championship, Danish National Girls Championship
- 2021 Mons Bank Mon Open, DGU Elite Tour III Damer & Piger, European Ladies' Club Trophy (individual)
- 2022 Junior Invitational at Sage Valley, French International Lady Juniors Amateur Championship

== Professional wins (1) ==
=== LET Access Series wins (1) ===
No.	Date	Tournament	Winning score	To par	Margin of victory	Runner-up
1	5 Apr 2025	Terre Blanche Ladies Open	65-69-72=206	−10	3 strokes	(France) Sara Brentcheneff (a)

LET Access Series playoff record (0–1)

No.	Year	Tournament	Opponent	Result
1	2025	Montauban Ladies Open	(Japan) Reina Fujikawa	Lost to par on sixth extra hole

== Team appearances ==
Amateur

- World Junior Girls Championship (representing Denmark): 2018, 2019, 2022
- European Girls' Team Championship (representing Denmark): 2018, 2019 (winners), 2020
- European Ladies' Team Championship (representing Denmark): 2020, 2021, 2022
- Junior Vagliano Trophy: (representing the Continent of Europe): 2019 (winners)
- Junior Solheim Cup: (representing Europe): 2019, 2021 (winners)
- Espirito Santo Trophy (representing Denmark): 2022
