= Caterina Don =

Italian amateur golfer (born 2001)

Personal information
- Nationality: Italy
- Born: 9 January 2001 (age 25) Pinerolo, Piemonte, Italy
- Height: 5 ft 5 in (1.65 m)

Career
- Sport: Golf
- College: University of Georgia
- Status: Amateur

Best results in LPGA major championships
- Chevron Championship: DNP
- Women's PGA C'ship: DNP
- U.S. Women's Open: CUT: 2020
- Women's British Open: DNP
- Evian Championship: DNP

Caterina Don (born 9 January 2001) is an Italian amateur golfer. She has won the World Junior Girls Championship, the Vagliano Trophy, and the European Girls' Team Championship twice, and reached No. 2 in the European Golf Rankings following the 2019 summer season.

== Early life ==
Don was born 2001 in Pinerolo near Turin in the Italian region of Piemonte, and started playing golf at around age 6 after her aunt and uncle took her to a course. She was skiing competitively in her youth, but eventually decided to quit skiing and take up golf competitively.

== Amateur career ==
She was soon drafted to the Italian National Team, and would go on the represent her country at four consecutive European Girls' Team Championships, all with great success. In 2016 and 2018 she led Italy to victory, in 2017 to a runner-up finish, and in 2019 to a third-place showing. All told, she compiled an 11–5–4 record in match play during those four events. At the 2019 event at El Saler Golf Course in Valencia, Spain, she captured medalist honors and shot 12-under 132 over 36 holes, four strokes better than the rest of the field.

Don won the individual bronze at the 2016 World Junior Girls Championship, and won the team gold with Alessia Nobilio and Emilie Alba Paltrinieri in 2018. She finished 6th at the 2018 Espirito Santo Trophy together with Alessia Nobilio and Emilie Alba Paltrinieri. In 2019, she served as captain of the Italian team for The Spirit International Amateur Golf Championship at Whispering Pines Golf Club in Texas, leading the squad to a 5th and 7th place in the women's and co-ed divisions, respectively.

She also excelled individually. In 2016, Don was runner-up at the Parco di Roma National Trophy, the Italian International Ladies Championship, and the Italian Ladies Stroke Play Championship (Isa Goldschmid Trophy). In 2017, she won the Italian Girls U18 National Championship (Roberta Bertotto Trophy) and the Italian U18 Team Championship (Emilio Pallavacino Trophy) together with Alessia Nobilio. In 2018, she beat Virginia Bossi in the final to win the Italian Girls U18 National Championship (Roberta Bertotto Trophy), but lost the final of the Italian Ladies Match Play (Giuseppe Silva Trophy) to Emilie Alba Paltrinieri.

In 2019, Don competed in the inaugural Augusta National Women's Amateur in April, where she shot 2-over 218 and tied for 12th. She again lost the final of the Italian Ladies Match Play (Giuseppe Silva Trophy) at Castelconturbia Golf Club, this time to Virginia Bossi. She finished third at the 2019 European Ladies Amateur Championship at Parkstone Golf Club, shooting 6-under 282 and falling one stroke shy of joining Alice Hewson and Krista Junkkari in a playoff for the title.

She played in the 2020 U.S. Women's Open at Champions Golf Club by virtue of being amongst the top 20 in Women's World Amateur Golf Ranking (WAGR). She played the Champions Club's Cypress Creek Course during Thursday's opening round and was briefly tied for second on the leaderboard after a birdie at hole 3.

Don was runner-up at the 2020 Italian Ladies Stroke Play Championship (Isa Goldschmid Trophy), 3 strokes behind Alessia Nobilio.

== College career ==
Don competed in 59 WAGR events, recording 29 top-10s, 23 top-5s and five victories between 2015 and 2019, and reached a world rank of 6th. As a result, in 2019, Don was offered and accepted a golf scholarship to the University of Georgia, majoring in mathematics. Playing with the Georgia Bulldogs women's golf team, she won the Minnesota Invitational in her collegiate debut, to become just the second Bulldog to do so since Summer Sirmons won the 1998 Auburn Tiger Invitational.

== Amateur wins ==
- 2015 Glauco Lolli Ghetti Trophy
- 2017 Italian Girls U18 National Championship (Roberta Bertotto Trophy), Italian U18 Team Championship (Emilio Pallavacino Trophy) (with Alessia Nobilio)
- 2018 Italian Girls U18 National Championship (Roberta Bertotto Trophy), Glauco Lolli Ghetti Trophy
- 2019 Minnesota Invitational
- 2020 GCAA Amateur Series - Georgia
- 2023 San Diego State Classic

== Team appearances ==
Amateur

- European Girls' Team Championship (representing Italy): 2016 (winners), 2017, 2018 (winners), 2019
- Espirito Santo Trophy (representing Italy): 2018
- Junior Vagliano Trophy (representing Europe): 2017 (winners)
- Vagliano Trophy (representing Europe): 2019 (winners)
- The Spirit International Amateur Golf Championship (representing Italy): 2019
- World Junior Girls Championship (representing Italy): 2016, 2017, 2018 (winners)
- European Ladies' Team Championship (representing Italy): 2023, 2025
