= Paula Schulz-Hanssen =

German golfer

Personal information
- Nationality: Germany
- Born: 1 April 2003 (age 23) Heidelberg, Germany

Career
- Sport: Golf
- College: Arizona State University
- Status: Amateur

Paula Schulz-Hanssen (born 1 April 2003) is a German amateur golfer and Arizona State Sun Devils women's golfer. She won the 2019 European Young Masters and the 2020 European Ladies Amateur individually, and the 2019 European Young Masters, the 2020 European Girls' Team Championship and the 2024 European Ladies' Team Championship with Germany.

== Amateur career ==
Schulz-Hanssen, as a member of the German National Team, won the 2020 European Girls' Team Championship and was runner-up at the 2020 European Ladies' Team Championship, after she lost 3 & 2 to Linn Grant in the final and the Swedish team won 2–1. The year before, she won the European Young Masters both individually and with the team. She went on to win the 2024 European Ladies' Team Championship alongside Helen Briem and Chiara Horder, where she secured two points in the final against France that ended 4 1/2–2 1/2.

In 2019, she recorded a victory at the Doral-Publix Junior Classic, and advanced to the quarterfinals in The R&A's Girls Amateur Championship. She finished in the top-10 in all but one of her six starts in 2020, including a win at the Swiss Ladies Amateur. She advanced to the quarterfinals of The Women's Amateur Championship.

Schulz-Hanssen captured the 2020 European Ladies Amateur, after rounds with 66, 66, 70 and 69. She had a one stroke lead after her fifth birdie of the day on the 16th hole, however she conceded her first double bogey of the championship on the last hole, dropping to 271 strokes (–13), level with Chloé Salort of France. A three-hole play-off battle for the title ensued, where Schulz-Hanssen took a one shot lead on the first hole with a birdie, and secured the title with another birdie on the third hole.

In 2021, she won the Junior Solheim Cup with the European team.

== College career ==
After reaching as high as 7th in the World Amateur Golf Ranking, Schulz-Hanssen enrolled at Arizona State University in 2022 and started playing with the Arizona State Sun Devils women's golf team.

== Amateur wins ==
- 2018 BWGV-Ranglistenturnier Mädchen 2
- 2019 European Young Masters, Doral-Publix Junior Classic
- 2020 European Ladies Amateur, Swiss International Ladies Championship

== Team appearances ==
Amateur

- Junior Solheim Cup (representing Europe): 2019, 2021
- European Young Masters (representing Germany): 2019 (winners)
- World Junior Girls Championship (representing Germany): 2019
- European Girls' Team Championship (representing Germany): 2019, 2020 (winners)
- European Ladies' Team Championship (representing Germany): 2020, 2022, 2023, 2024 (winners), 2025, 2026
