= Emilie Alba Paltrinieri =

Italian golfer (born 2001)

Personal information
- Nickname: Emi
- Nationality: Italy
- Born: 1 October 2001 (age 25) Paris, France
- Height: 5 ft 8 in (1.73 m)

Career
- Sport: Golf
- College: University of California, Los Angeles (2019–23); University of Michigan (2023–24)
- Status: Amateur

Emilie Alba Paltrinieri (born 1 October 2001) is an Italian amateur golfer. She won The R&A's Girls Amateur Championship in 2016 and the German Girls Open in 2019. With Italy, she won the European Girls' Team Championship twice (2016, 2018), and the 2018 World Junior Girls Championship.

== Amateur career ==
Paltrinieri was born in Paris, France, before her family moved to Milan, Italy when she was a young child. A golf prodigy, she became a member of the Italian national team at age 11, and helped her country to victories at the 2016 and 2018 European Girls' Team Championships, as well as the 2018 World Junior Girls Championship in Canada alongside Caterina Don and Alessia Nobilio.

She played in the 2016 Junior Golf World Cup in Japan and the 2018 Espirito Santo Trophy in Ireland. She was a member of the European teams at the Junior Ryder Cup in 2016 and 2018, and at the 2017 Junior Vagliano Trophy in Bologna where the Europeans beat Great Britain & Ireland by 15 to 3.

In 2016, Paltrinieri won the Girls Amateur Championship at Royal St David's, and in 2020 she reached the semi-finals of the Women's Amateur Championship at West Lancashire Golf Club.

In 2018, she captured the Italian double, winning both the Italian Ladies' Match Play and the Italian Ladies' Stroke Play Championship. The following year she won the German Girls Open.

Paltrinieri played in the European Tour's first full-field mixed professional tournament, the 2019 Jordan Mixed Open, where she made the cut. In the 2020 Omega Dubai Moonlight Classic, a Ladies European Tour event, she finished 16th.

In 2022, she reached the quarter-finals at the Women's Amateur Championship at Hunstanton Golf Club. After finishing qualifying medalist runner-up with two rounds of 69 (–8) she defeated Elice Fredriksson (3 & 2), Vaïrana Heck (1-up) and Amelia Jane Williamson (2 & 1), before a quarter-final loss to eventual champion Jess Baker (3 & 2).

== College career ==
Paltrinieri attended UCLA as a molecular biology major and played with the UCLA Bruins women's golf team between 2019 and 2023. As a freshman she was a WGCA Third Team All-American and Golfweek Honorable Mention All-American.

For her graduate studies, Paltrinieri attended the University of Michigan and played with the Michigan Wolverines women's golf team between 2023 and 2024.

== Amateur wins ==
- 2014 Gran Premio Vecchio Monastero
- 2016 Italian Ladies Matchplay (Giuseppe Silva Trophy), Girls Amateur Championship
- 2018 Italian Ladies Matchplay (Giuseppe Silva Trophy), Italian Ladies Strokeplay (Isa Goldschmid Trophy)
- 2019 German Girls Open

== Team appearances ==
Amateur

- European Girls' Team Championship (representing Italy): 2015, 2016 (winners), 2017, 2018 (winners), 2019
- European Ladies' Team Championship (representing Italy): 2021, 2022
- Junior Golf World Cup: (representing Italy): 2016
- Junior Ryder Cup (representing Europe): 2016, 2018
- Junior Vagliano Trophy: (representing the Continent of Europe): 2017 (winners)
- World Junior Girls Championship (representing Italy): 2018 (winners)
- Espirito Santo Trophy (representing Italy): 2018
