= Alessia Nobilio =

Italian golfer (born 2001)

Personal information
- Nationality: Italy
- Born: 7 September 2001 (age 25) Milan, Italy
- Height: 5 ft 5 in (1.65 m)

Career
- Sport: Golf
- College: UCLA
- Turned professional: 2024
- Current tour: Ladies European Tour (joined 2025)
- Former tour: LET Access Series (joined 2024)

Best results in LPGA major championships
- Chevron Championship: DNP
- Women's PGA C'ship: DNP
- U.S. Women's Open: CUT: 2020
- Women's British Open: DNP
- Evian Championship: DNP
Medal record
Youth Olympic Games
| Silver medal – second place | 2018 Buenos Aires | Girls' individual |

Alessia Nobilio (born 7 September 2001) is an Italian professional golfer and Ladies European Tour player. She won silver at the 2018 Summer Youth Olympics and has won the French Ladies Amateur, Portuguese Ladies Amateur and the English Women's Open Amateur Stroke Play Championship.

== Amateur career ==
Nobilio had a successful amateur career across Europe. She won the 2016 and 2017 International Juniors of Belgium, the Italian U18 Team Championship in 2015, 2017 and 2019, the Italian Ladies Stroke Play Championship in 2019 and 2020, and the 2020 Portuguese Ladies Amateur.

Also, she was runner-up at the Italian Ladies Amateur twice (2016 and 2019), at the 2016 Austrian Ladies Amateur, and lost the final of the Spanish Ladies Amateur twice, in 2017 to Frida Kinhult of Sweden and in 2019 to Candice Mahe of France. In 2018 she was runner-up at the German Girls Open, one stroke behind Ingrid Lindblad, and in 2019 runner-up at the Internazionali d'Italia Femminili U18. She placed 5th at the 2019 Girls Amateur Championship after finishing as the leading qualifier for the match play stage.

At the World Junior Girls Championship in Canada, she won the team gold in 2018 and lost a playoff to Seo-yun Kwon in 2017 for the individual title, was runner-up two strokes behind Atthaya Thitikul in 2018, and was third in 2019, again behind winner Thitikul.

Nobilio won the girls' individual silver at the 2018 Summer Youth Olympics after prevailing in a playoff against Emma Spitz of Austria and Yuka Saso of the Philippines.

She represented Italy at the European Girls' Team Championship each year between 2015 and 2018, winning in 2016 and 2018, and the European Ladies' Team Championship between 2019 and 2024. In 2022, she beat Caley McGinty 3 & 1 as Italy lost to England in the final. Ranked as one of the best juniors in Europe, she represented the continent in the Junior Solheim Cup and Junior Ryder Cup, as well as the Junior Vagliano Trophy and the Vagliano Trophy.

Nobilio reached the number three spot in the World Amateur Golf Ranking and in 2020 accepted a golf scholarship to UCLA where she was a business economics major. However, due to pandemic restrictions she wasn't able to start her freshman year in person at UCLA and missed out on her first year on the UCLA Bruins women's golf team.

She played in the 2020 U.S. Women's Open and the 2021 Ladies Italian Open, where she finished tied 21st. She was top female in the 2021 Roma Alps LETAS Open, a mixed event staged jointly by the 2021 Alps Tour and the 2021 LET Access Series.

Nobilio was runner-up in the 2023 Finnish Amateur Championship, behind Katri Bakker, and was runner-up behind Patricia Isabel Schmidt in the 2024 Ahlsell Trophy, a professional event.

== Professional career ==
Nobilio turned professional in 2024 and joined the LET Access Series, where she recorded four top-4 finishes in six starts to finish 12th in the season rankings.

She earned her card for the 2025 Ladies European Tour at Q-School where she tied for 16th.

== Amateur wins ==
- 2015 (2) Italian U18 Team Championship (Emilio Pallavacino Trophy) (with Karla Camila Vigliotta), Targa d'Oro
- 2016 (3) International Juniors of Belgium, Targa d'Oro, French Ladies Amateur
- 2017 (2) International Juniors of Belgium, Italian U18 Team Championship (Emilio Pallavacino Trophy) (with Caterina Don)
- 2019 (4) Italian Ladies Stroke Play Championship (Isa Goldschmid Trophy), Italian U18 Team Championship (Emilio Pallavacino Trophy), Citta di Milano Trofeo Gianni Albertini, Trofeo Glauco Lolli Ghetti
- 2020 (4) Italian Ladies Stroke Play Championship, Gran Premio Vecchio Monastero, Gran Premio di Monticello, Portuguese Ladies Amateur
- 2021 (1) Gran Premio Vecchio Monastero Memorial Antonio Bozzi
- 2022 (1) English Women's Open Amateur Stroke Play Championship

== Professional wins ==
=== LET Access Series ===
| Date | Tournament | Score | To par | WWGR points | Notes | Ref |
|---|---|---|---|---|---|---|
| 2021 | Roma Alps LETAS Open^ | 201 | −15 | 2 | Mixed event with the Alps Tour | |

^ Low female golfer

== Team appearances ==
Amateur

- European Girls' Team Championship (representing Italy): 2015, 2016 (winners), 2017, 2018 (winners)
- European Ladies' Team Championship (representing Italy): 2019, 2020, 2021, 2022, 2023, 2024
- Junior Golf World Cup: (representing Italy): 2016
- World Junior Girls Championship (representing Italy): 2017, 2018 (winners), 2019
- Junior Vagliano Trophy: (representing the Continent of Europe): 2017 (winners)
- Junior Solheim Cup (representing Europe): 2017, 2019
- Junior Ryder Cup (representing Europe): 2018
- Vagliano Trophy: (representing the Continent of Europe): 2019 (winners)
- Summer Youth Olympics Mixed team event (representing Italy): 2018
- Espirito Santo Trophy (representing Italy): 2018
