= Annika Invitational Europe =

Annual amateur golf tournament in Sweden

ANNIKA Invitational Europe
Tournament information
- Location: Sweden
- Course: Upsala Golfklub
- Organised by: Swedish Golf Federation
- Format: 54-hole stroke play
- Month played: June

Current champion
- (England) Lauren Crump

Location map
- Location in Europe Location in Sweden

The ANNIKA Invitational Europe is an annual amateur golf tournament in Sweden for European girls under 18.

The tournament, founded by Annika Sörenstam in 2012, is a qualifying event for the European team in the Junior Solheim Cup since 2015 and has been rated up to level "A" in the World Amateur Golf Ranking.

== Format ==
The tournament is stroke play over 54 holes, 18 holes on each day of the tournament, with no cut. In addition to twelve exemptions and open entries to make up the field of 78, the top 60 players on the World Amateur Golf Ranking at the start of the year who represents a country that is a member of the European Golf Association are invited.

== Winners ==
Year	Venue	Champion	Score	Margin of victory	Runner(s)-up	Ref
2026	Upsala Golfklub	(England) Lauren Crump	−12 (66-69-69=204)	10 strokes	(Germany) Sofia Maier-Borst	
2025	Bokskogen Golf Club	(Poland) Kinga Kusmierska	−5 (72-66-73=211)	1 stroke	(Italy) Natalia Aparicio	
2024	Isaberg Golf Club	(France) Louise Uma Landgraf	−2 (69-69-73=211)	2 strokes	(Sweden) Molly Rålin	
2023	Halmstad Golf Club	(Switzerland) Yana Beeli	−6 (73-68-69=210)	2 strokes	(Spain) Balma Dávalos Guaita (Poland) Kinga Kusmierska (Netherlands) Fleur van Beek	
2022	Vasatorp Golf Club	(Italy) Francesca Fiorellini	−5 (69-71-74=214)	Playoff	(Sweden) Nora Sundberg	
2021	Isaberg Golf Club	(Sweden) Meja Örtengren	+5 (73-74-71=218)	1 stroke	(Sweden) Nora Sundberg	(Note: The 2021 edition played with only Swedish competitors due to pandemic restrictions.)
2020	Halmstad Golf Club	Cancelled due to pandemic				
2019	Vasatorp Golf Club	(England) Lily May Humphreys	−12 (69-68-70=207)	1 stroke	(Denmark) Anne Normann	
2018	Drottningholm Golf Club	(Italy) Anna Zanusso	−7 (69-74-66=209)	3 strokes	(Sweden) Ingrid Lindblad	
2017	Halmstad Golf Club	(Sweden) Amanda Linnér	−3 (71-71-71=213)	Playoff	(England) Annabell Fuller	
2016	Bokskogen Golf Club	(Sweden) Beatrice Wallin	−6 (74-69-67=210)	4 strokes	(France) Charlotte Lafourcade (Spain) Paula Neira Garcia	
2015	Bro-Bålsta Golf Club	(Spain) Ana Peláez	−9 (69-69-72=210)	3 strokes	(France) María Parra Luque	
2014	Forsgården Golf Club	(France) Marion Veysseyre	−3 (70-74-69=213)	1 stroke	(France) Elodie Bridenne (Spain) Ana Peláez	
2013	Landskrona Golf Club	(Denmark) Malene Krølbøll Hansen	−11 (70-70-65=205)	2 strokes	(Spain) Celia Barquín Arozamena (England) Sophie Lamb	
2012	Linköping Golf Club	(Sweden) Linnea Ström	−11 (70-70-65=205)	2 strokes	(Belgium) Leslie Cloots (Sweden) My Leander	
