= 2023 Espirito Santo Trophy =

Tournament information
- Dates: 25–28 October
- Location: Abu Dhabi, United Arab Emirates; 24°28′N 54°32′E
- Course: Abu Dhabi Golf Club (National Course)
- Organized by: International Golf Federation
- Format: 72 holes stroke play

Statistics
- Par: 72
- Length: 6,497 yards (5,941 m)
- Field: 36 teams 108 players

Champion
- South Korea; Lee Hyo-song, Seo Kyo-rim, Kim Min-sol
- 554 (−22)
- Location in United Arab Emirates Location in Persian Gulf Location in West Asia

The 2023 Espirito Santo Trophy took place 25–28 October at Abu Dhabi Golf Club in Abu Dhabi, United Arab Emirates.

It was the 30th women's golf World Amateur Team Championship for the Espirito Santo Trophy.

== Format ==
The tournament was a 72-hole stroke play team event. Each team of three players played four rounds. The best two scores for each round counted towards the team total.

== Venue ==
Abu Dhabi Golf Club had previously hosted the Abu Dhabi Golf Championship on the European Tour 2006 to 2021.

Course layout

Hole	1	2	3	4	5	6	7	8	9	Out	10	11	12	13	14	15	16	17	18	In	Total
Metre	317	473	331	125	346	387	140	466	356	2,941	473	344	152	313	383	177	366	352	439	2,999	5,940
Yards	347	517	362	137	379	423	153	510	390	3,218	517	376	166	342	419	194	400	385	480	3,279	6,497
Par	4	5	4	3	4	4	3	5	4	36	5	4	3	4	4	3	4	4	5	36	72

== Teams ==
36 teams entered the event and completed the competition. Each team had three players.

The top ten finishing teams at the 2022 Espirito Santo Trophy and the 2023 host nation were automatically qualified. The field was filled based on the two highest ranked players from each nation in the World Amateur Golf Ranking, with places assured from all five continents in the championship.

Country	Players
Australia	Justice Bosio, Maddison Hinson-Tolchard, Caitlin Peirce
Belgium	Sophie Bert, Savannah De Bock, Céline Manche
Bolivia	Florencia Cuellar Gutierrez, Constaza Quiroga, Victoria Suarez
Canada	Monet Chun, Katie Cranston, Lauren Kim
Chile	Carolina Alcaíno, Michelle Melandri, Amelia Ruiz
Chinese Taipei	Huai-Chien Hsu, Ting-Hsuan Huang, Hsin-Chun Liao
China	Tong An, XinYu Cao, Zixin Ni
Colombia	María Hoyos, Ana Sofía Murcia, Cristina Ochoa
Czech Republic	Veronika Kedronova, Patricie Macková, Denisa Vodickova
Denmark	Olivia Grønborg, Natacha Host Husted, Cecilie Leth-Nissen
England	Charlotte Heath, Caley McGinty, Lottie Woad
Finland	Katri Bakker, Henni Mustonen, Emilia Väistö
France	Adéla Cernousek, Vaïrana Heck, Louise Uma Landgraf
Germany	Helen Briem, Chiara Horder, Celina Sattelkau
Hong Kong	Sophie Han, Arianna Lau, Hoi Ki Lau
India	Mannat Brar, Nishna Patel, Avani Prashanth
Ireland	Sara Byrne, Beth Coulter, Aine Donegan
Italy	Natalia Aparicio, Francesca Fiorellini, Matilde Partele
Japan	Mizuki Hashimoto, Mamika Shinchi, Miku Ueta
Mexico	Lauren Daiana Olivares, Cory Lopez, Vania Alicia Simont
Morocco	Malak Bouraeda, Sofia Cherif Essakali, Rim Imni
Netherlands	Rosanne Boere, Anne-Sterre den Dunnen, Lynn van der Sluijs
New Zealand	Eunseo Choi, Vivian Lu, Fiona Xu
Norway	Anna Krekling, Mia S. Lussand, Silje Torvund Ohma
Pakistan	Humna Amjad, Parkha Ijaz, Rimsha Ijaz
Philippines	Junia Louise Gabasa, Rianne Malixi, Grace Pauline Quintanilla
Scotland	Hannah Darling, Carmen Griffiths, Lorna McClymont
Singapore	Aloysa Margiela Atienza, Xingtong Chen, Inez Ng
South Africa	Caitlyn Macnab, Kajal Mistry, Megan Streicher
South Korea	Kim Min-sol, Lee Hyo-song, Seo Kyo-rim
Spain	Carla Bernat Escuder, Cayetana Fernández, Julia López Ramirez
Sweden	Ingrid Lindblad, Meja Örtengren, Kajsa Arwefjäll
Switzerland	Yana Beeli, Victoria Levy, Caroline Sturdza
Thailand	Eila Galitsky, Navaporn Soontreeyapas, Suvichaya Vinijchaitham
United Arab Emirates	Jamie Camero, Lara El Chaib, Intissar Rich
United States	Anna Davis, Rachel Kuehn, Megan Schofill

== Winners ==
Team South Korea won the trophy for their fifth title, beating team Chinese Taipei by four strokes. Team Spain earned the bronze another stroke back. Defending champion Sweden finished tied 13th, 17 strokes behind the winner.

== Results ==
Team standings
Place	Country	Score	To par
1st place, gold medalist(s)	South Korea	140-137-138-139=554	−22
2nd place, silver medalist(s)	Chinese Taipei	144-139-135-140=558	−18
3rd place, bronze medalist(s)	Spain	137-138-140-144=559	−17
T4	England	144-137-139-140=560	−16
T4	Thailand	141-134-141-144=560	−16
T6	Australia	141-134-144-142=561	−15
T6	United States	142-139-144-136=561	−15
8	Canada	138-144-142-140=564	−12
9	New Zealand	148-135-141-141=565	−11
10	Italy	143-147-137-141=568	−8
T11	Germany	140-142-143-144=569	−7
T11	Scotland	141-142-143-143=569	−7
T13	Ireland	139-145-141-146=571	−5
T13	Norway	143-142-146-140=571	−5
T13	Sweden	142-147-138-144=571	−5
16	India	140-142-143-148=573	−3
17	France	146-146-141-142=575	−1
18	Hong Kong	145-142-143-146=576	E
19	Philippines	143-146-140-149=578	+2
T20	Colombia	142-147-147-143=579	+3
T20	Mexico	144-145-143-147=579	+3
T20	Singapore	145-148-144-142=579	+3
T23	Morocco	144-145-145-147=581	+5
T23	Switzerland	144-151-142-144=581	+5
25	Finland	148-149-143-142=582	+6
26	Japan	145-141-147-150=583	+7
27	South Africa	149-144-146-145=584	+8
28	Denmark	151-146-145-143=585	+9
29	Netherlands	147-148-145-147=587	+11
T30	China	152-142-149-145=588	+12
T30	Czech Republic	143-148-149-148=588	+12
32	Belgium	144-153-147-151=595	+19
33	United Arab Emirates	150-153-145-152=600	+24
34	Chile	153-161-150-149=613	+37
35	Pakistan	151-156-159-162=628	+52
35	Bolivia	162-164-160-167=653	+77

Individual leaders
Place	Player	Country	Score	To par
1	Hsu Huai-Chien	Chinese Taipei	72-68-66-69=275	−13
2	Cayetana Fernández	Spain	68-69-70-70=277	−11
3	Seo Kyo-rim	South Korea	69-67-71-71=278	−10
T4	Inez Ng	Singapore	72-70-68-69=279	−9
T4	Avani Prashanth	India	68-68-71-72=279	−9
T4	Lottie Woad	England	72-70-69-68=279	−9
T4	Fiona Xu	New Zealand	74-67-69-69=279	−9
T8	Francesca Fiorellini	Italy	73-75-65-67=280	−8
T8	Maddison Hinson-Tolchard	Australia	72-66-71-71=280	−8
T8	Lauren Kim	Canada	69-72-68-71=280	−8

Note: There was no official award for the lowest individual scores.
