= Meja Örtengren =

Swedish golfer (born 2005)

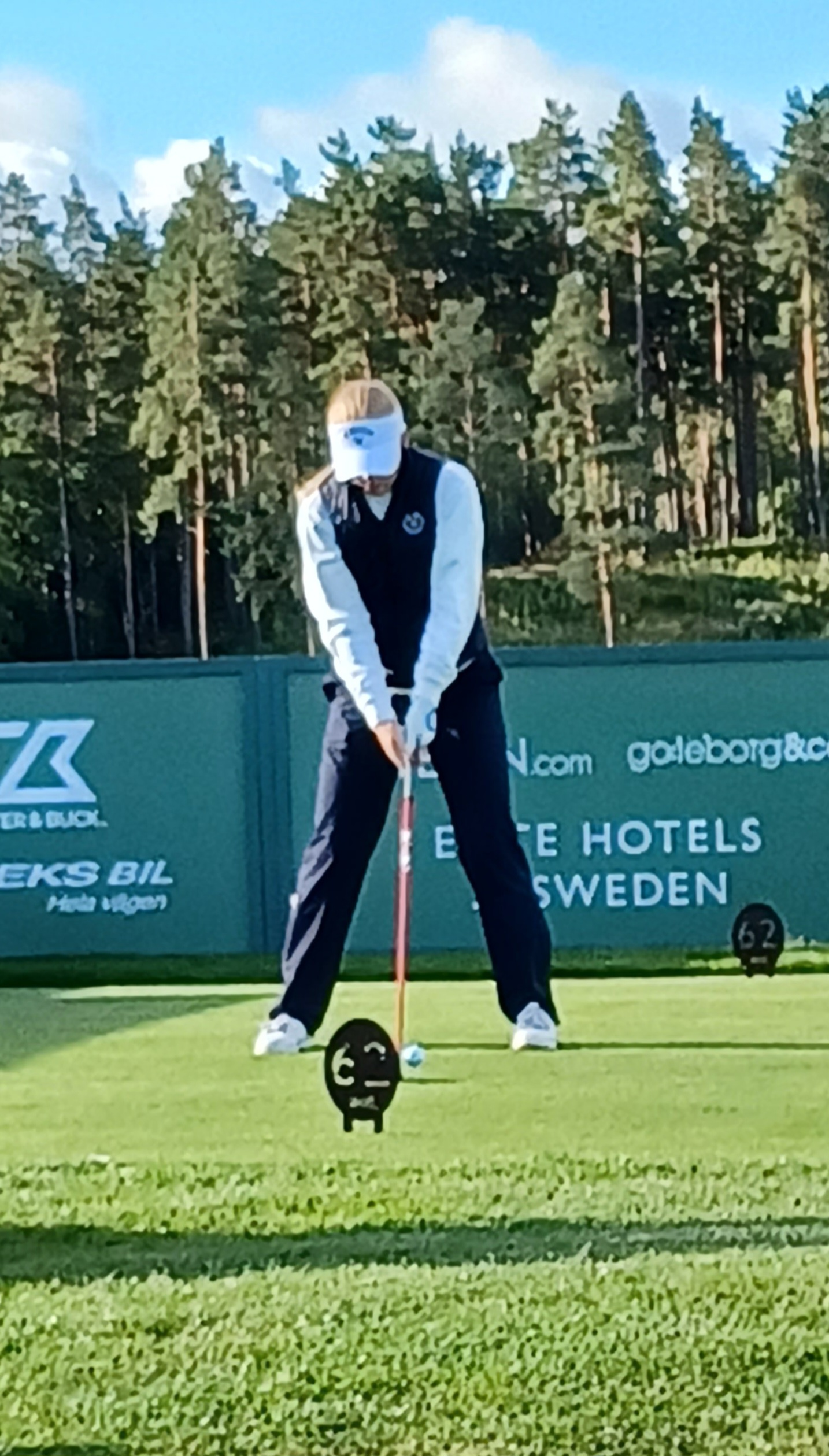
- Örtengren at the 2025 Hills Ladies Open

Personal information
- Full name: Meja Alice Ida Örtengren
- Nationality: Sweden
- Born: 3 January 2005 (age 21) Linköping, Sweden

Career
- Sport: Golf
- College: Stanford University
- Status: Amateur
- Professional wins: 2

Number of wins by tour
- Ladies European Tour: 1
- Other: 1

Best results in LPGA major championships
- Chevron Championship: DNP
- Women's PGA C'ship: DNP
- U.S. Women's Open: CUT: 2026
- Women's British Open: CUT: 2025
- Evian Championship: DNP

Achievements and awards
- Atlantic Coast Conference Freshman of the Year: 2025
- Division I WGCA Freshman of the Year: 2024–25
- WGCA All-American Scholars: 2024–25

Meja Örtengren (born 3 January 2005) is a Swedish amateur golfer and Stanford Cardinal women's golf team player. In 2022, 17 years old, she was part of the Swedish team winning the Espirito Santo Trophy and was individual co-medalist. During 2022, she also captured her first win in a professional tournament, the Swedish PGA Championship. She won the Rolex Tournament of Champions, a leading junior tournament in the United States, back-to-back in 2021 and 2022 and the Hills Open on the Ladies European Tour in 2025.

== Amateur career ==
Örtengren started playing golf at age 4 and was a licensed player by 7, and would go on to enjoy a very decorated amateur career. She started competing at age 10 and played in her first Swedish Golf Tour event at 14, the Hoya Ladies Open at Flommen Golf Club, where she held the lead after round one.

=== National team ===
Örtengren joined the National Team and helped secure silver at the 2020 European Girls' Team Championship at Hrubá Borša, Slovakia. She was part of the Swedish team winning the 2022 Espirito Santo Trophy at Le Golf National in France, with Ingrid Lindblad and Louise Rydqvist, where Örtengren also recorded the lowest individual score, tied with Helen Briem and Rose Zhang.

Örtengren was the individual leader in stroke play at the 2023 European Ladies' Team Championship at Tawast Golf & Country Club in Finland. She won the 2024 European Nations Cup – Copa Sotogrande with the Swedish team by 17 strokes ahead of England in second, and she was runner-up for the individual title behind only her compatriot Elin Pudas Remler.

=== Individual success ===
In 2021, Örtengren won the German Girls Open and the Annika Invitational Europe, and was tapped by captain Annika Sörenstam to represent Europe at the 2021 Junior Solheim Cup, held at Sylvania Country Club in Toledo, Ohio.

Örtengren was runner-up at the French International Lady Juniors Amateur Championship at Golf de Saint-Cloud behind Francesca Fiorellini in 2021, and won the event in a final against Andrea Revuelta in 2023. She rounded off her 2021 season by winning the AJGA's 44th annual Rolex Tournament of Champions at PGA National Resort and Spa in Palm Beach Gardens, Florida, with a six-stroke victory over Alexa Pano, a title which she successfully defended in 2022 at TPC San Antonio, with a score of 273 (−15).

In the 2023 Girls Amateur Championship at Ganton Golf Club and Fulford Golf Club in Yorkshire, England, she was the 36-hole stroke-play qualifying medalist with a 12-under-par score of 136, five strokes ahead of nearest competitor. However, Örtengren lost to Martina Navarro Navarro on the 20th hole in the semi-final after coming back from 5 holes down after 11 holes.

In 2026, Örtengren was runner-up at the European Ladies Amateur Championship, held at Allerum Golf Club in Sweden, two shots behind Charlotte Naughton.

=== Professional events ===
Örtengren made a series of LET Access Series starts. She came close to winning her first professional event at the 2021 GolfUppsala Open, missing to join a playoff with Kajsa Arwefjäll and Sofie Bringner by one stroke to finish third. A week later, she was in contention at the Anna Nordqvist Västerås Open after an opening round of 64, but ultimately finished tied for sixth. Instead she, at age 17, captured her first win in a professional tournament at the 2022 Swedish PGA Championship Trelleborg, following a playoff with Zhen Bontan.

She made her international LET debut at the 2024 Amundi German Masters, where she sat in second place after the first round, and was the only other amateur to make the cut, alongside Helen Briem. On 24 August 2025, Örtengren, still an amateur, won her first title on the Ladies European Tour, the Hills Ladies Open at Hills Golf Club outside Gothenburg in her home country Sweden. With the win, she joined Lottie Woad as the only two amateurs to win official LET events since Jana Melichová also did so in June 2022 and reached a career best fourth in the World Amateur Golf Ranking.

== Collegiate career ==
Örtengren enrolled at Stanford University in the fall of 2024 and started playing with the Stanford Cardinal women's golf team. She won her first tournament in February 2025, and was named Atlantic Coast Conference Freshman of the Year, Division I WGCA Freshman of the Year and to the Spring Annika Award Watch List. She reached the final of the 2025 NCAA Division I women's golf championship with Stanford and tied for 10th individually. During the fall of her sophomore year she captured her second college win at the Nanea Invitational

== Amateur wins ==
- 2015 (2) Skandia Tour Distrikt Östergötland #5, Skandia Tour Distrikt Östergötland #6
- 2018 (2) Alex Norén Junior Open, Teen Cup Riksfinal F13
- 2019 (4) Magnus Jakobssons Memorial, Onsjö C&B Junior Open, Teen Cup Riksfinal F14, Teen Tour Final F13-16
- 2020 (3) Östgöta Junior Open, Teen Tour Elite #6, Swedish Golf Team Invitation
- 2021 (3) German Girls Open, Annika Invitational Europe, Rolex Tournament of Champions
- 2022 (1) Rolex Tournament of Champions
- 2023 (1) Internationaux de France U21 - Trophée Esmond
- 2025 (2) San Diego State Classic, Nanea Invitational

== Professional wins (2) ==
=== Ladies European Tour wins (1) ===
| No. | Date | Tournament | Winning score | Margin of victory | Runners-up | Ref |
|---|---|---|---|---|---|---|
| 1 | 24 Aug 2025 | Hills Ladies Open (as an amateur) | −6 (68-69-70=207) | 2 strokes | (Germany) Leonie Harm (Sweden) Lisa Pettersson | |

=== LET Access Series wins (1) ===
| No. | Date | Tournament | Winning score | Margin of victory | Runner-up |
|---|---|---|---|---|---|
| 1 | 21 May 2022 | PGA Championship Trelleborg^{1} (as an amateur) | −2 (69-74-68=211) | Playoff | (Netherlands) Zhen Bontan |

^{1}Co-sanctioned by the Nordic Golf Tour

== Results in LPGA majors ==
| Tournament | 2025 | 2026 |
|---|---|---|
| Chevron Championship | | |
| U.S. Women's Open | | CUT |
| Women's PGA Championship | | |
| The Evian Championship | | |
| Women's British Open | CUT | |

Did not play

CUT = missed the half-way cut

== Team appearances ==
Amateur

- European Young Masters (representing Sweden): 2019, 2020
- European Girls' Team Championship (representing Sweden): 2020, 2021, 2022
- Junior Solheim Cup (representing Europe): 2021 (winners), 2023 (winners)
- Junior Vagliano Trophy (representing the Continent of Europe): 2021 (winners)
- Espirito Santo Trophy (representing Sweden): 2022 (winners), 2023, 2025
- World Junior Girls Championship (representing Sweden): 2022
- European Ladies' Team Championship (representing Sweden): 2023, 2024, 2025, 2026
- Vagliano Trophy (representing Europe): 2023 (winners)
- Patsy Hankins Trophy (representing Europe): 2023 (winners)
- Junior Ryder Cup (representing Europe): 2023 (winners)
- European Nations Cup – Copa Sotogrande (representing Sweden): 2024 (winners)
- Spirit International Amateur (representing Sweden): 2024
- Arnold Palmer Cup (representing International): 2025 (winners)
