= Francesca Fiorellini =

Italian golfer (born 2005)

Personal information
- Nationality: Italy
- Born: 2005 (age 20–21) Rome, Italy
- Height: 5 ft 6 in (1.68 m)

Career
- Sport: Golf
- College: University of California, Los Angeles; Louisiana State
- Status: Amateur

Francesca Fiorellini (born 2005) is an Italian amateur golfer. She has won the R&A's Girls U16 Amateur, the Internationaux de France U21 – Trophée Esmond, the Portuguese International Ladies Amateur Championship, and the Annika Invitational Europe. She represented Europe in the 2021 Junior Solheim Cup.

== Early life ==
Fiorellini is from Rome and a member of the Olgiata Golf Club.

== Amateur career ==
Fiorellini has had a successful junior career across Europe. In 2018, she won the English Girls U14 Championship and in 2019, she won the second edition of the British Girls U16 Amateur Golf Championship at Fulford Golf Club, securing a wire-to-wire victory on six-under-par.

Fiorellini joined the National Team and represented Italy at the European Young Masters, the European Girls' Team Championship and the World Junior Girls Championship in Canada. Ranked as one of the best juniors in Europe, she represented the continent in the Junior Vagliano Trophy and in the triumphant 2021 Junior Solheim Cup at Sylvania Country Club in Ohio under captain Annika Sörenstam.

In 2022, Fiorellini won the Annika Invitational Europe at Vasatorp Golf Club, beating home player Nora Sundberg with a par on the fourth playoff hole. She finished in a tie for 36th at the Ladies Italian Open, a Ladies European Tour event.

In 2023, Fiorellini triumphed in the Italian International Ladies Amateur Championship at Circolo Golf Torino, the only participant to score below par, beating defending champion Helen Briem in second by four strokes.

== College career ==
Fiorellini graduated from Rome's Seraphicum Scholastic Complex in 2024 and followed her compatriots Emilie Paltrinieri and Alessia Nobilio to UCLA. Playing with the UCLA Bruins women's golf team she won the Bruin Wave Invitational, but transferred to Louisiana State and the LSU Lady Tigers golf team ahead of her sophomore year in 2025.

== Amateur wins ==
- 2018 English Girls U14 Open Amateur Championship
- 2019 Coppa d'Oro Citta di Roma, British Girls U16 Amateur Golf Championship, Quercia d'Oro
- 2020 Coppa d'Oro Mario Camicia, Coppa d'Oro Citta di Castelgandolfo
- 2021 Coppa d'Oro Mario Camicia, Trofeo Stella d'Oro Olgiata, Italian U18 Trofeo Silvio Marazza, Italian Ladies Match Play – Giuseppe Silva Trophy, Internationaux de France U21 – Trophée Esmond
- 2022 Portuguese International Ladies Amateur Championship, Italian U18 Trofeo Silvio Marazza, Italian Ladies Stroke Play Championship – Isa Goldschmid Trophy, Annika Invitational Europe
- 2023 Italian Ladies Match Play – Giuseppe Silva Trophy, Italian International Ladies Amateur Championship
- 2024 Spanish International Ladies' Amateur Championship
- 2025 Bruin Wave Invitational

== Team appearances ==
Amateur

- European Young Masters (representing Italy): 2019, 2020, 2021
- Junior Vagliano Trophy: (representing the Continent of Europe): 2019 (winners), 2021 (winners)
- European Girls' Team Championship (representing Italy): 2020, 2021, 2022, 2023
- Junior Solheim Cup (representing Europe): 2021 (winners), 2023 (winners)
- World Junior Girls Championship (representing Italy): 2022, 2023
- Espirito Santo Trophy (representing Italy): 2022, 2023, 2025
- European Ladies' Team Championship (representing Italy): 2024, 2025, 2026
- Patsy Hankins Trophy (representing Europe): 2023, 2025
- Junior Ryder Cup (representing Europe): 2023 (winners)
