= Hannah Darling =

Hannah Darling may refer to:

- Hannah Darling (rugby union)
- Hannah Darling (golfer)
