= Duke of York Young Champions Trophy =

Golf tournament

Tournament information
- Location: United Kingdom
- Established: 2001
- Course: Links Courses
- Format: Stroke play
- Month played: September
- Final year: 2019

Final champion
- (England) Conor Gaugh

The Duke of York Young Champions Trophy was an international golf tournament for boys and girls who were either the current holders of their under-18 National Championship or had won another major golfing event in the preceding twelve months. First played in 2001, the event was supported by The R&A and their affiliated national governing bodies and counts towards the World Amateur Golf Rankings and the American Junior Golf Association's performance based entry system. It had a 54-hole stroke play format.

== History ==
The event was created by The Duke of York and John Simpson. The event, invite-only and supported by The R&A, aimed to "promote the development of junior golf, encourage competitiveness and friendship between individual champions whilst also offering a unique opportunity for boys and girls to compete for the same Trophy on a top quality UK links course".

The tournament has grown from having just 11 competitors from six countries in 2001, to a field of 55 champions from 32 countries in 2013. The Duke of York Young Champions Trophy is organised in many ways like a professional tournament in order to give the potential stars of the future a chance to experience what life as a golf professional might involve; hence the inclusion of sponsors and official functions, including the Official Dinner hosted by the Duke of York, as well as an educational talk. Past players include Rory McIlroy, Anna Nordqvist, Matteo Manassero, and Tom Lewis.

The tournament was wound up in 2020 when the Prince Andrew Charitable Trust ceased operations following the Jeffrey Epstein scandal.

== Academic and golf scholarships ==
The Duke of York Sports Foundation is a registered charity established in 2004 to promote amateur sports. Academic and golf scholarships have been awarded since September 2007 to provide under 18 boys and girls with the opportunity to receive a high standard of education whilst at the same time focusing on their golf and offer an alternative to studying and training in the USA.

Wellington College in Berkshire was chosen as the school that met all the criteria required to support both aspects of the scholarship. It offers the International Baccalaureate, a standard 9-hole golf course, and practice facilities on site. It is also located near many different courses (including Wentworth and Sunningdale), coaches, and major airports.

Candidates must meet Wellington College's academic standard, demonstrate a high level of golfing ability with clear signs of potential and are selected on a case-by-case basis. To date, the Foundation has awarded five academic and golf scholarships. All the scholars are aged between 14 and 17, with handicaps ranging from three to plus-two. The Foundation's aim is to award eight to ten scholarships to individuals by 2011.

== Champions ==
Year	Venue	Champion	Winning score	Winning margin	Runner(s)-up	Leading boy/girl	Number of competitors	Countries represented
2001	Royal Liverpool	(England) Michael Nester	210 (−6)	7 strokes	(Russia) Grigory Bondarenko	(Scotland) Clare Queen	11	6
2002	Royal Liverpool	(Spain) Carlos del Moral	219 (+3)	5 strokes	(Republic of Ireland) Cian MacNamara	(Spain) Azahara Muñoz	26	13
2003	Castletown	(Sweden) Rikard Karlberg	219 (+3)	6 strokes	(Spain) Pablo Martín	(Belgium) Justine Barbier	31	16
2004	Kingsbarns	(Wales) Zac Gould	212 (−4)	3 strokes	(Republic of Ireland) Rory McIlroy	(Sweden) Anna Nordqvist	36	20
2005	Castletown	(England) Oliver Fisher	212 (−4)	1 stroke	(Italy) Andrea Pavan	(Sweden) Anna Nordqvist	39	20
2006	Dundonald	(England) Sam Hutsby	216 (E)	2 strokes	(Switzerland) Marc Dobias (Sweden) Robin Wingårdh	(Scotland) Carly Booth	42	22
2007	Dundonald	(Italy) Claudio Vigano	220 (+4)	2 strokes	(Italy) Giulia Molinaro (France) Isabelle Boineau (Denmark) Joachim B. Hansen	(Italy) Giulia Molinaro	49	28
2008	Dundonald	(England) Stiggy Hodgson	212 (−4)	11 strokes	(France) Arnaud Abbas	(Netherlands) Marieke Nivard	51	28
2009	Dundonald	(Thailand) Moriya Jutanugarn	218 (+2)	1 stroke	(Israel) Laetitia Beck	(Canada) Richard Jung	57	34
2010	Royal St George's	(Iceland) Guðmundur Kristjánsson	218 (+5)	1 stroke	(Republic of Ireland) Dermot McElroy	(Republic of Ireland) Leona Maguire	57	32
2011	Royal Liverpool	(England) Harry Casey	226 (+13)	Playoff	(Spain) Harang Lee	(Spain) Harang Lee	57	31
2012	Royal Troon	(Iceland) Ragnar Garðarsson	225 (+12)	Playoff	(England) Max Orrin (Slovenia) Katja Pogačar	(Slovenia) Katja Pogačar	53	31
2013	Royal St George's	(Italy) Guido Migliozzi	215 (+2)	1 stroke	(England) Jack Singh Brar	(United States) Nicole Morales	55	32
2014	Royal Aberdeen	(Iceland) Gisli Sveinbergsson	137 (−5)*	4 strokes	(Japan) Ren Okazaki	(Italy) Carlotta Ricolfi	57	30
2015	Prince's	(Finland) Oliver Lindell	207 (−9)	1 stroke	(Sweden) Felix Pålson	(Italy) Carlotta Ricolfi	56	29
2016	Royal Birkdale	(Canada) Chloe Currie	214 (−2)	1 stroke	(Norway) Markus Braadlie	(Norway) Markus Braadlie	49	28
2017	Royal Liverpool	(England) Ben Jones	218 (+2)	8 strokes	(Sweden) Oscar Teiffel (Denmark) Rasmus Neergaard-Petersen (Japan) Keita Nakajima	(Norway) Franziska Sliper	54	30
2018	Castle Stuart	(Canada) Christopher Vandette	226 (+10)	Playoff	(Republic of Ireland) Joseph Byrne	(South Korea) Heejong Lim	54	30
2019	Royal Portrush	(England) Conor Gaugh	222 (+6)	6 strokes	(England) Callum Macfie	(South Korea) Ina Yoon	62	37

^{*} Due to fog and poor visibility, the 2014 competition was reduced to 36 holes.

== Courses ==
The Duke of York Young Champions Trophy used to be held at links courses across the UK. Dundonald Links and Royal Liverpool played host to the tournament four times.

Duke of York Young Champions Trophy (the United Kingdom)

== Participating countries ==
As of 2014, 50 countries have participated in the Duke of York Young Champions Trophy.

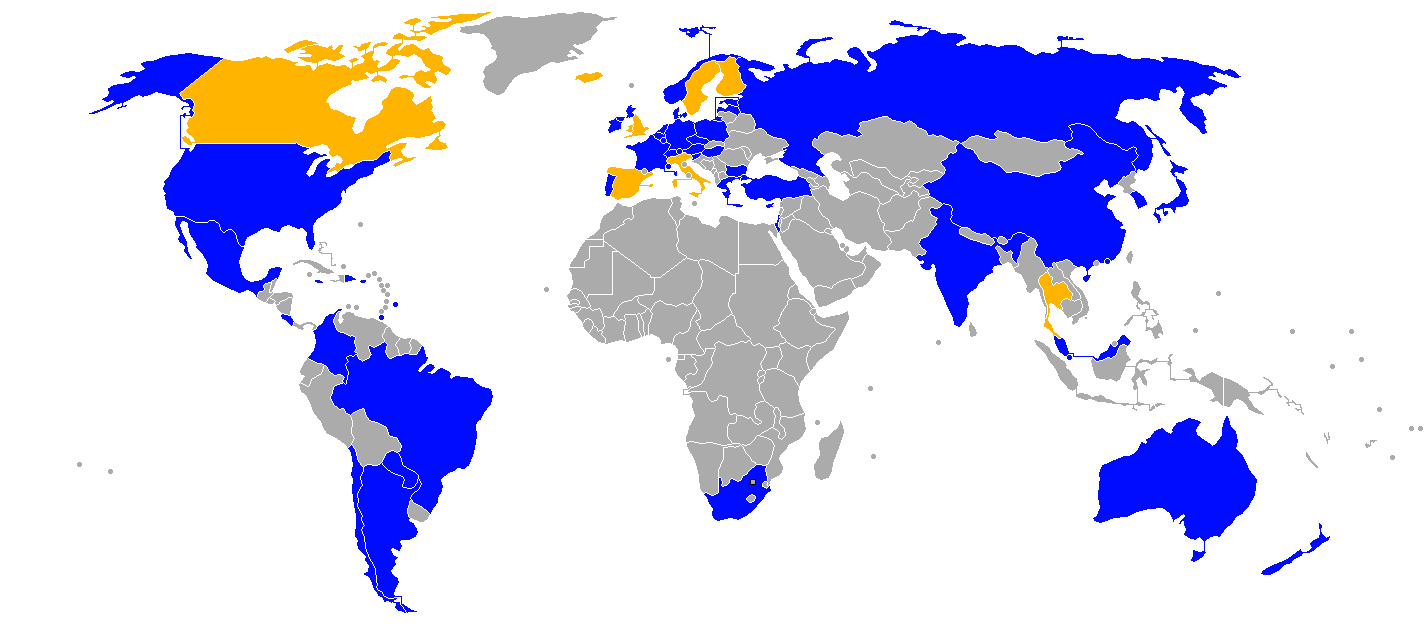
Countries that have participated in the Duke of York Young Champions Trophy. Country has won the Trophy Country has participated in the Trophy Country has not entered the Trophy

== Notable past players ==
- Rory McIlroy: winner of the 2011 U.S. Open, the 2012 and 2014 PGA Championship and the 2014 Open Championship
- Ariya Jutanugarn: winner of the 2016 Women's British Open and the 2018 U.S. Women's Open
- Anna Nordqvist: winner of the 2009 LPGA Championship
- Matteo Manassero: winner of the 2009 British Amateur and the 2013 BMW PGA Championship
- Melissa Reid: winner of six Ladies European Tour events
- Pablo Martín: winner of three European Tour events, first amateur ever to win a European Tour event.
- Carly Booth: winner of two Ladies European Tour events
- Oliver Fisher: youngest ever Walker Cup player in 2005
- Tom Lewis: Silver Medal winner at the 2011 Open Championship
- Laetitia Beck: Israeli champion, and gold medal winner in the 2009 and 2013 Maccabiah Games.
