= Junior Ryder Cup =

U18 golf competition between Europe and the US

Tournament information
- Location: 2025: Farmingdale, New York, United States
- Established: 1997
- Courses: 2025: Nassau Country Club & Bethpage Black Course
- Format: Match play
- Month played: September

Current champion
- United States

The Junior Ryder Cup is a team golf competition between Europe and the United States for junior golfers aged 18 and under. It is based on the men's Ryder Cup and is run by the same organisations, the PGA of America and Ryder Cup Europe.

The 2018 event took place at Golf Disneyland, Marne-la-Vallée, Paris, France on Monday 24 and Tuesday 25 September. The United States won 12 1/2–11 1/2, their sixth successive victory in the event.

After postponement and then cancellation of the 2020 event due to COVID-19 pandemic, it was next held in 2023 at Golf Nazionale and Marco Simone Golf and Country Club in Italy from September 26–28.

== Format ==
The teams consist of six boys and six girls. From 2008 to 2018 the tournament was played over two days of foursomes, fourball and singles matches. There were three boys' matches and three girls' foursomes matches and six mixed fourball matches on the first day. There were 12 singles matches on the second day, In 2023 the event will be extended to three days with foursomes and fourballs played on the first two days and the singles played on the final day. From 2008 to 2018 there was an informal "friendship match" played on the Ryder Cup course after the Junior Ryder Cup but before the Ryder Cup. However in 2023 the final day singles matches will be played at the host venue. From 1997 to 2006 only fourball matches were played. There were three boys' matches and three girls' matches on the first day and six mixed matches on the second day.

== History ==
In 1995 an informal match was played between European junior golfers and Central New York PGA Section and area juniors. The European team included 15-year-old Sergio García.

== Results ==
Year	Venue	Location	Winning team	Score	USA captain(s)	Europe captain(s)	Ref.
2025	Nassau Country Club & Bethpage Black Course	Farmingdale, New York, U.S.	United States	17 1/2–12 1/2	Suzy Whaley	(Scotland) Stephen Gallacher	
2023	Golf Nazionale & Marco Simone Golf and Country Club	Rome, Italy	Europe	20 1/2–9 1/2	Paul Levy	(Scotland) Stephen Gallacher	
2020	Postponed to 2021, then cancelled, due to COVID-19 pandemic						
2018	Golf Disneyland	Marne-la-Vallée, Paris, France	United States	12 1/2–11 1/2	Allen Wronowski	(France) Maïtena Alsuguren	
2016	Interlachen Country Club	Edina, Minnesota, U.S.	United States	15 1/2–8 1/2	Jim Remy	(France) Maïtena Alsuguren	
2014	Blairgowrie Golf Club	Blairgowrie, Perthshire, Scotland	United States	16–8	Brian Whitcomb	(Scotland) Stuart Wilson	
2012	Olympia Fields Country Club	Olympia Fields, Illinois, U.S.	United States	14 1/2–9 1/2	Roger Warren	(Scotland) Stuart Wilson	
2010	Gleneagles Resort	Gleneagles, Scotland	United States	13 1/2–10 1/2	M.G. Orender	(Austria) Gary Stangl	
2008	The Club at Olde Stone	Bowling Green, Kentucky, U.S.	United States	22–2	Ken Lindsay	(Austria) Gary Stangl	
2006	Celtic Manor Resort	Newport, Wales	Europe^{1}	6–6	Jack Connelly	(Wales) Andy Ingram	
2004	Westfield Group Country Club	Westfield Center, Ohio, U.S.	Europe	8 1/2–3 1/2	Will Mann	(Wales) Andy Ingram	
2002	The K Club	Straffan, County Kildare, Ireland	Europe	9 1/2–2 1/2	Tom Addis III; Susan Addis	(Norway) Charlie Westrup (Spain) Macarena Campomanes	
1999	New Seabury Country Club	Mashpee, Massachusetts, U.S.	Europe	10 1/2–1 1/2	Mark Brazil	(Republic of Ireland) Jimmy Greene (Spain) Macarena Campomanes	
1997	Alcaidesa Links Golf Resort & San Roque Golf Club	La Línea, Cádiz, Spain	United States	7–5	Mark Brazil	–	

^{1}In the event of a tie the current holder retains the cup.

== Teams ==
=== United States ===
2025:

- Girls: Zoe Cusack, Anna Fang, Rayee Feng, Lily Peng, Asterisk Talley, Amelie Zalsman
- Boys: Hamilton Coleman, Luke Colton, Lunden Esterline, Tyler Mawhinney, Giuseppe Puebla, Miles Russell

2023:

- Girls: Leigh Chien, Kylie Chong, Gianna Clemente, Anna Davis, Ryleigh Knaub, Yana Wilson
- Boys: Jackson Byrd, Billy Davis, Nicholas Gross, Will Hartman, Jay Leng Jr., Miles Russell

2018:

- Girls: Rachel Heck, Lucy Li, Yealimi Noh, Alexa Pano, Erica Shepherd, Rose Zhang
- Boys: Akshay Bhatia, Ricky Castillo, Canon Claycomb, William Moll, Cole Ponich, Michael Thorbjornsen

2016:

- Girls: Alyaa Abdulghany, Hailee Cooper, Gina Kim, Lucy Li, Emilia Migliaccio, Kaitlyn Papp
- Boys: Wilson Furr, Noah Goodwin, Eugene Hong, Davis Shore, Patrick Welch, Norman Xiong

2014:

- Girls: Sierra Brooks, Kristen Gillman, Amy Lee, Andrea Lee, Hannah O'Sullivan, Bethany Wu
- Boys: Sam Burns, Austin Connelly, Brad Dalke, Gordon Neale, Davis Riley, Cameron Young

2012:

- Girls: Casie Cathrea, Karen Chung, Casey Danielson, Alison Lee, Esther Lee, Samantha Wagner
- Boys: Cameron Champ, Gavin Hall, Beau Hossler, Jim Liu, Scottie Scheffler, Robby Shelton

2010:

- Girls: Doris Chen, Ginger Howard, Cassy Isagawa, Alison Lee, Kristen Park, Emma Talley
- Boys: Jim Liu, Denny McCarthy, Anthony Paolucci, Ollie Schniederjans, Jordan Spieth, Justin Thomas

2008:

- Girls: Sarah Brown, Danielle Frasier, Jennifer Johnson, Erynne Lee, Tiffany Lua, Lexi Thompson
- Boys: Jeffrey Kang, Anthony Paolucci, Cameron Peck, Jordan Spieth, Cory Whitsett, Andrew Yun

2006:

- Girls: Brittany Altomare, Cassandra Blaney, Esther Choe, Vicky Hurst, Isabelle Lendl, Kristen Schelling
- Boys: Bud Cauley, Tony Finau, Philip Francis, Drew Kittleson, Joe Monte, Andrew Yun

2004:

- Girls: Kelly Fuchik, Mina Harigae, Angela Oh, Anne Ormson, Jessica Smith, Tessa Teachman
- Boys: Chris DeForest, Josh Dupont, Kyle English, Tony Finau, Luke Guthrie, Chase Wright

2002:

- Girls: Tiffany Chudy, Mallory Code, Stephanie Connelly, Jennifer Davis, Lauren Mielbrecht, Jenny Suh
- Boys: Travis Esway, Shaun Felechner, Taylor Hall, Adam Porzak, Colin Wilcox, Casey Wittenberg

1999:

- Girls: Erica Blasberg, Catherine Cartwright, Leigh Anne Hardin, Cheryl Hennessy, Ina Kim, Angela Rho
- Boys: Michael Barbosa, Jason Hartwick, Hunter Mahan, Matt Rosenfeld, Ty Tryon, James Vargas

1997:

- Girls: Beth Bauer, Leigh Anne Hardin, Angela Jerman, Blair O'Neal, Kim Rowton, Cimmie Shahan
- Boys: J. C. DeLeon, Bubba Dickerson, David Gossett, John Klauk, James Oh, Leif Olson

=== Europe ===
2025:

- Girls: Sara Brentcheneff, Benedicte Brent-Petersen, Alice Kong, Nagore Martinez, Charlotte Naughton, Louise Uma Landgraf
- Boys: Callixte Alzas, Oscar Couilleau, John Doyle, Lev Grinberg, Kris Kim, Hugo Le Goff

2023:

- Girls: Helen Briem, Francesca Fiorellini, Meja Örtengren, Andrea Revuelta, Nora Sundberg, Rocio Tejedo
- Boys: Giovanni Binaghi, Connor Graham, Lev Grinberg, Sean Keeling, Kris Kim, Peer Wernicke

2018:

- Girls: Emilie Alba Paltrinieri, Annabell Fuller, Ingrid Lindblad, Amanda Linnér, Alessia Nobilio, Emma Spitz
- Boys: Conor Gough, Nicolai Højgaard, Rasmus Højgaard, David Puig, Eduard Rousaud Sabate, Robin Williams

2016:

- Girls: Emilie Alba Paltrinieri, Julia Engström, Frida Kinhult, Pauline Roussin-Bouchard, Emma Spitz, Beatrice Wallin
- Boys: Jonathan Gøth-Rasmussen, Falko Hanisch, Matias Honkala, Adrien Pendaries, Kristoffer Reitan, Marcus Svensson

2014:

- Girls: Mathilda Cappeliez, Virginia Elena Carta, Annabel Dimmock, Alexandra Försterling, Emily Kristine Pedersen, Linnea Ström
- Boys: John Axelsen, Iván Cantero, Marcus Kinhult, Bradley Neil, Renato Paratore, Max Schmitt

2012:

- Girls: Quirine Eijkenboom, Bronte Law, Harang Lee, Emily Kristine Pedersen, Covadonga Sanjuan, Linnea Ström
- Boys: Dominic Foos, Gavin Moynihan, Renato Paratore, Matthias Schwab, Victor Tärnström, Toby Tree

2010:

- Girls: Amy Boulden, Isabella Deilert, Manon Gidali, Manon Mollé, Klára Spilková, Kelly Tidy
- Boys: Thomas Detry, Albert Eckhardt, Juhana Kukkonen, Moritz Lampert, Chris Lloyd, Kristoffer Ventura

2008:

- Girls: Anna Arrese, Carly Booth, Leona Maguire, Lisa Maguire, Daisy Nielsen, Kelly Tidy
- Boys: Julien Brun, Stanislas Gautier, Moritz Lampert, Chris Lloyd, Matteo Manassero, Adrián Otaegui

2006:

- Girls: Carly Booth, Carlota Ciganda, Laura Gonzales-Escallon, Saskia Hausladen, Giulia Molinaro, Marta Silva
- Boys: Victor Dubuisson, Sean Einhaus, Pedro Figueiredo, Are Friestad, Maximilian Kieffer, Anders Kristiansen

2004:

- Girls: Carlota Ciganda, Linn Gustafsson, Camilla Lennarth, Belen Mozo, Florentyna Parker, Valerie Sternebeck
- Boys: Dominic Angkawidjaja, Oliver Fisher, Lluís García del Moral, Zac Gould, Rory McIlroy, Marius Thorp

2002:

- Girls: Carmen Alonso, Emma Cabrera-Bello, Claire Grignolo, Dewi Claire Schreefel, Denise Simon, Katharina Werdinig
- Boys: Raphaël De Sousa, Matteo Delpodio, Peter-Max Hamm, Farren Keenan, Tony Raillard, Benjamin Régent

1999:

- Girls: Carmen Alonzo, Tullia Calzavara, Martina Eberl, Lucia Mar, Suzann Pettersen, Denise Simon
- Boys: Rafa Cabrera-Bello, Nicolas Colsaerts, Raphaël De Sousa, Alfonso Gutierrez, David Porter, Craig Stevenson

1997:

- Girls: Nuria Clau, Vikki Laing, Paula Martí, Suzann Pettersen, Federica Piovano, Giulia Sergas
- Boys: Pascal Celhay, Nicolas Colsaerts, Ómar Halldórsson, Roberto Paolillo, Stefano Reale, Tuomas Tuovinen

== See also ==
- Junior Solheim Cup
- Junior Presidents Cup
