= Irish Women's Amateur Open Championship =

Tournament information
- Location: Ireland
- Established: 1993
- Organised by: Golf Ireland
- Format: Stroke play

Current champion
- (France) Louise Uma Landgraf

The Irish Women's Amateur Open Championship is the women's national amateur stroke play golf championship of Ireland. It was first played in 1993 and is currently organised by Golf Ireland.

== Winners ==
Year	Winner	Score	Margin of victory	Runner(s)-up	Venue(s)	Ref.
2026	(France) Louise Uma Landgraf	216	1 stroke	(Republic of Ireland) Jessica Ross	Newlands	
2025	(France) Louise Uma Landgraf	207	4 strokes	(Wales) Carys Worby	Headfort	
2024	(Republic of Ireland) Anna Foster	210	4 strokes	(Northern Ireland) Annabel Wilson	Woodbrook	
2023	(Scotland) Lorna McClymont	206	3 strokes	(Republic of Ireland) Beth Coulter	Woodbrook	
2022	(Scotland) Lorna McClymont	213	4 strokes	(Northern Ireland) Katie Poots	County Louth	
2021	(Germany) Charlotte Back	212	3 strokes	(Republic of Ireland) Beth Coulter (Sweden) Moa Svedenskiöld	County Louth	
2020	Cancelled due to the COVID-19 pandemic in the Republic of Ireland				County Louth	
2019	(England) Lily May Humphreys	212	6 strokes	(Netherlands) Romy Meekers	County Louth	
2018	(Scotland) Hannah McCook	223	2 strokes	(Netherlands) Romy Meekers	County Louth	
2017	(Republic of Ireland) Maria Dunne	216	2 strokes	(England) Gemma Clews (England) Sophie Lamb	County Louth	
2016	(Northern Ireland) Olivia Mehaffey	223	8 strokes	(Republic of Ireland) Chloe Ryan	The Island	
2015	(Austria) Isabella Holpfer	221	Playoff (Note: Holpfer beat Ryan on the first playoff hole.)	(Republic of Ireland) Chloe Ryan	Dun Laoghaire	
2014	(England) Lucy Goddard	217	1 stroke	(Republic of Ireland) Chloe Ryan	Douglas	
2013	(England) Meghan Maclaren	218	1 stroke	(Northern Ireland) Paula Grant	Castle	
2012	(England) Emily Taylor	233	3 strokes	(Republic of Ireland) Mary Dowling (Republic of Ireland) Gillian O'Leary	The Island	
2011	(Republic of Ireland) Leona Maguire	206	8 strokes	(Northern Ireland) Stephanie Meadow	Elm Park	
2010	(England) Hannah Burke	214	5 strokes	(Australia) Justine Lee	Newlands	
2009	(Republic of Ireland) Lisa Maguire	214	Playoff (Note: Maguire beat Burke on the seventh playoff hole.)	(England) Hannah Burke	Douglas	
2008	(Wales) Breanne Loucks	214	3 strokes	(Scotland) Roseanne Niven	Elm Park	
2007	(Australia) Stacey Keating	225	1 stroke	(Australia) Bree Arthur (Wales) Stephanie Evans (Republic of Ireland) Niamh Kitching (Republic of Ireland) Marian Riordan	Clandeboye	
2006	(Republic of Ireland) Martina Gillen	224	3 strokes	(Republic of Ireland) Deirdre Smith	County Sligo	
2005	(Republic of Ireland) Tara Delaney	219	2 strokes	(Republic of Ireland) Maura Morrin (Scotland) Kylie Walker	Hermitage	
2004	(Republic of Ireland) Tara Delaney	220	Playoff (Note: Delaney beat Gillen in a playoff. They were still tied after a 3-hole playoff. Delaney won after a further five sudden-death holes.)	(Republic of Ireland) Martina Gillen	Cork	
2003	(Republic of Ireland) Claire Coughlan	215	7 strokes	(Republic of Ireland) Maura Morrin	Rathsallagh	
2002	(Republic of Ireland) Rebecca Coakley	214	Countback (Note: Coakley won on countback having the lower score for the last 36 holes: 140 to Gillen's 141.)	(Republic of Ireland) Martina Gillen	Dundalk	
2001	(Scotland) Anne Laing	214	4 strokes	(Scotland) Vikki Laing	Birr	
2000	(Republic of Ireland) Rebecca Coakley	205	6 strokes	(Republic of Ireland) Claire Coughlan	Birr	
1999	(Republic of Ireland) Hazel Kavanagh	217	2 strokes	(Republic of Ireland) Elaine Dowdall	Waterford Castle	
1998	(Republic of Ireland) Suzanne O'Brien	141 (Note: Event reduced to 36 holes because of adverse weather.)	6 strokes	(Republic of Ireland) Lillian Behan	Waterford Castle	
1997	(Republic of Ireland) Yvonne Cassidy	217	1 stroke	(Northern Ireland) Paula Gorman	Waterford Castle	
1996	(Republic of Ireland) Eileen Rose Power	218	2 strokes	(Wales) Lisa Dermott	Grange	
1995	(Northern Ireland) Naoimh Quigg	300 (Note: Event contested over 72 holes.)	1 stroke	(England) Kate Egford (Republic of Ireland) Denise McCarthy	Grange	
1994	(Republic of Ireland) Hazel Kavanagh	286	7 strokes	(Republic of Ireland) Tracey Eakin	Milltown	
1993	(Republic of Ireland) Tracey Eakin	293	8 strokes	(Republic of Ireland) Eileen Rose Power (Republic of Ireland) Aideen Rogers (Wales) Vicki Thomas	Milltown	
