= Caitlyn Macnab =

South African professional golfer

Personal information
- Full name: Caitlyn Tate Macnab
- Nickname: Cay
- Nationality: South Africa
- Born: 18 February 2002 (age 24) Johannesburg, South Africa
- Height: 163 cm (5 ft 4 in)

Career
- Sport: Golf
- College: Texas Christian University; University of Mississippi
- Turned professional: 2025
- Current tours: Ladies European Tour (joined 2026); Sunshine Ladies Tour (joined 2026)
- Professional wins: 2

Number of wins by tour
- Sunshine Tour: 1
- Other: 1

Achievements and awards
- Sunshine Ladies Tour Rookie of the Year: 2026

Caitlyn Tate Macnab (born 18 February 2002) is a South African professional golfer who plays on the Ladies European Tour. She won the 2021 Jabra Ladies Open on the Sunshine Ladies Tour.

== Early life and amateur career ==
Macnab was born in Johannesburg. She is attached to Serengeti Golf Estate, and played in her first tournament on her first 4th birthday.

After finishing runner-up in 2018, Macnab won the 2019 South African Girls Championship, and won the South African Women's Amateur back-to-back in 2020 and 2021, defending her title by beating Megan Streicher 11 & 9 in the 36-hole match play. She ranked the number one amateur in South Africa.

In 2021, she tied for 16th at the Investec South African Women's Open, a Ladies European Tour event, after winning the Jabra Ladies Open and finishing runner-up at the SuperSport Ladies Challenge on the Sunshine Ladies Tour. Macnab became the first amateur winner on the South African women's professional golf circuit since major winner Ashleigh Buhai in 2007.

== College career ==
Macnab was enrolled at Texas Christian University in Fort Worth from 2021 to 2023, and played with the TCU Horned Frogs women's golf team, where she was on the WGCA Freshman of the Year Watch List and named All-American twice. After two years she transferred to the University of Mississippi to play with the Ole Miss Rebels women's golf team, where she won several tournaments including the 2024 NCAA Division I Bermuda Run Regional and the 2025 SEC Championship.

She was named All-American four times, appeared at the Augusta National Women's Amateur four consecutive years, the Arnold Palmer Cup three consecutive years, and on the 2025 Annika Award Post-season Watch List for women's college golf Player of the Year honors.

Macnab reached a rank of 18th on the World Amateur Golf Ranking.

== Professional career ==
Macnab turned professional in 2025. She joined the 2026 Ladies European Tour after earning her card at Q-School. She also joined the Sunshine Ladies Tour, where she was named 2026 Rookie of the Year following three top-5 finishes and a win at the NTT Data Ladies Pro-Am team event with Cherise van der Walt.

== Amateur wins ==
- 2017 Ekurhuleni Open & Junior Championship, KwaZulu-Natal Junior Championship
- 2018 WGSA 72 Hole Individual Championship
- 2019 Eastern Province and Border Championship, North West Championship, All Africa Juniors Challenge, WGSA 72 Hole Individual Championship, South African Girls Championship, Gauteng North Women's Open Championship, Mpumalanga Championship, KwaZulu-Natal Junior Championship
- 2020 South African Women's Amateur Stroke Play and Match Play Championship, Ekurhuleni Open & Junior Championship
- 2021 South African Women's Amateur Stroke Play and Match Play Championships, Free State Open & Junior Championship
- 2022 The Schooner Fall Classic
- 2023 Mason Rudolph Women's Championship
- 2024 NCAA DI Bermuda Run Regional, Mary Fossum Invitational
- 2025 SEC Women's Golf Championship

== Professional wins (2) ==
=== Sunshine Tour wins (1) ===
No.	Date	Tournament	Winning score	Margin of victory	Runner-up
1	7 Jun 2026	Waterfall City Tournament of Champions	−8 (68-73-70-69=280)	1 stroke	(Mexico) Luis Carrera

=== Sunshine Ladies Tour wins (1) ===
No.	Date	Tournament	Winning score	Margin of victory	Runners-up	Ref
1	16 Apr 2021	Jabra Ladies Classic (as an amateur)	−12 (69-68-67=204)	8 strokes	(South Africa) Lindi Coetzee (South Africa) Nicole Garcia	

== Team appearances ==
Amateur

- South African Women's Inter-Provincial (representing Gauteng): 2016, 2017, 2018, 2019
- Espirito Santo Trophy (representing South Africa): 2018, 2022, 2023
- Junior Golf World Cup (representing South Africa): 2018, 2019
- Astor Trophy (representing South Africa): 2019
- Arnold Palmer Cup (representing the International team): 2023, 2024, 2025 (winners)
- Spirit International Amateur (representing South Africa): 2024
