= Harang Lee =

Spanish professional golfer (born 1995)

Personal information
- Nationality: Spain
- Born: 23 December 1995 (age 30) Bilbao, Spain
- Height: 1.77 m (5 ft 10 in)

Career
- Sport: Golf
- College: University of Georgia
- Turned professional: 2017
- Current tour: Ladies European Tour (joined 2020)
- Former tours: LPGA Tour (joined 2018); Symetra Tour (joined 2018)
- Professional wins: 1

Harang Lee (born 23 December 1995) is a Spanish professional golfer and member of the Ladies European Tour (LET) who has played on the U.S.-based LPGA Tour.

== Amateur career ==
Lee was born to ethnic Korean parents in Bilbao and raised in Castro Urdiales, Spain. She was a member of the Spanish National Team and played in three European Girls' Team Championships, winning the bronze in 2011, silver in 2012 and bronze again in 2013, before winning the silver at the 2016 European Ladies' Team Championship.

In addition to playing for Spain, Lee was a member of the European teams at the 2011 Junior Vagliano Trophy, the 2012 Junior Ryder Cup and the 2013 European Junior Solheim Cup. She finished 7th at the 2016 Espirito Santo Trophy together with María Parra and Luna Sobrón.

Her individual amateur achievements include winning the 2011 Duke of York Young Champions Trophy and the European Young Masters, where she captured medalist honors in impressive fashion, besting the field by nine shots following a closing round of 68. She first burst onto the international scene as a 14-year-old in 2009 by winning the Grand Prix de Chiberta, defeating Delphine Dupuis of France in a sudden-death playoff. She was runner-up at the 2011 Campeonato Nacional Individual behind Camilla Hedberg. In 2012, she won the Spanish International Stroke Play Championship by two shots, and lost one up to eventual champion Emily Kristine Pedersen in the round of 16 at the 2013 Spanish Ladies Amateur. She won the 2015 Grand Prix des Landes in France.

Lee graduated from IES Ortega & Gasett in 2013. She spent her collegiate career with the Georgia Bulldogs women's golf team at University of Georgia from 2013 to 2017. She was selected first-team All-America by Golfweek in 2016 and finished runner-up at the 2017 SEC Championship by shooting 11-under 205, matching both the second-best score in UGA and Southeast Conference history in the process.

== Professional career ==
Lee turned professional in the fall of 2017. She earned conditional status on the LPGA Tour for 2018 and played mainly on the Symetra Tour in 2018 and 2019 with a best finish of third in the 2018 Sioux Falls GreatLIFE Challenge, five strokes behind Linnea Ström.

In 2020, Lee made her LET debut at the Australian Ladies Classic, and went on to make the cut in all six appearances. She recorded a season-best finish of T22 at the Andalucia Costa Del Sol Open De España after promising finishes of T24 at the Saudi Ladies Team International and T27 at the VP Bank Swiss Ladies Open. In 2021, she finished T16 at the South African Women's Open and T12 at the Jabra Ladies Open.

== Amateur wins ==
- 2009 Grand Prix de Chiberta
- 2011 European Young Masters (individual), Duke of York Young Champions Trophy, Spanish U16 Nationals
- 2012 Spanish International Stroke Play Championship
- 2015 Grand Prix des Landes

== Professional wins (1) ==
=== Santander Golf Tour (1) ===
No.	Date	Tournament	Winning score	To par	Margin of victory	Runner-up	Ref
1	4 Sep 2020	Santander Golf Tour Cantabria	70-66=136	−6	1 stroke	(Spain) Luna Sobrón	

== Team appearances ==
Amateur

- European Young Masters (representing Spain): 2011 (winners)
- Junior Vagliano Trophy (representing the Continent of Europe): 2011 (winners)
- Junior Ryder Cup (representing the Continent of Europe): 2012
- Junior Solheim Cup (representing the Continent of Europe): 2013
- Espirito Santo Trophy (representing Spain): 2016
- European Girls' Team Championship (representing Spain): 2011, 2012, 2013
- European Ladies' Team Championship (representing Spain): 2016, 2017
