= Suvichaya Vinijchaitham =

Thai professional golfer (born 2006)

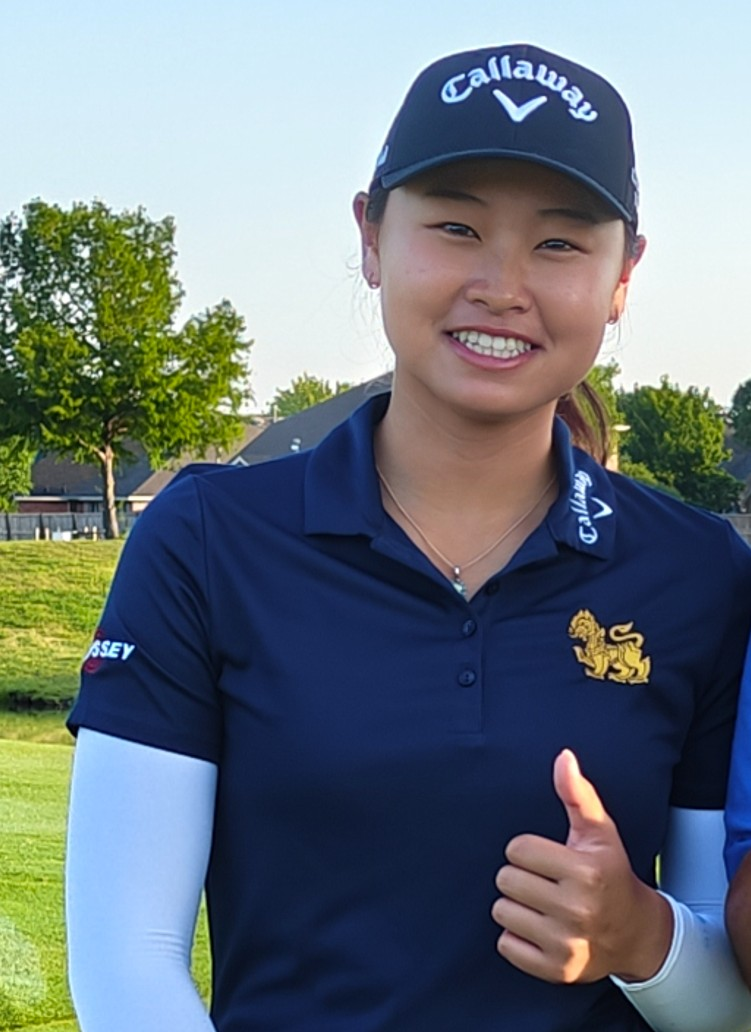
- Suvichaya Vinijchaitham in 2026

Personal information
- Full name: Suvichaya Vinijchaitham
- Nickname: Hut
- Nationality: Thailand
- Born: 6 April 2006 (age 20) Khon Kaen, Thailand

Career
- Sport: Golf
- College: University of Oregon
- Turned professional: 2025
- Current tour: LPGA Tour

Best results in LPGA major championships
- Chevron Championship: 71st: 2026
- Women's PGA C'ship: CUT: 2026
- U.S. Women's Open: DNP
- Women's British Open: DNP
- Evian Championship: CUT: 2026

Suvichaya Vinijchaitham (Thai: สุวิชยา วินิจฉัยธรรม; nickname Hut (ฮัท); born 6 April 2006) is a Thai professional golfer currently playing on the LPGA Tour.

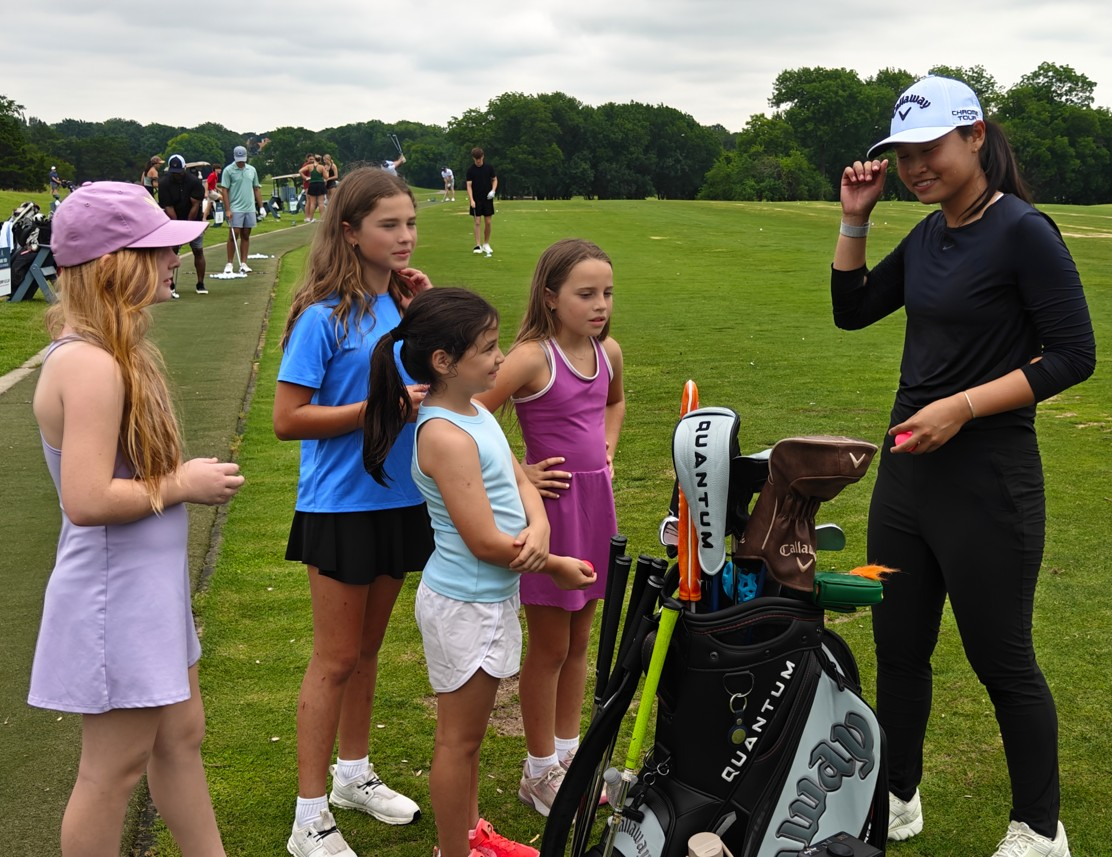
Suvichaya Vinijchaitham with fans

== Early life and amateur career ==
Vinijchaitham was born on 6 April 2006 in Khon Kaen, Thailand. She began playing golf at the age of five.

During her amateur career, Vinijchaitham represented Thailand at the Espirito Santo Trophy in 2022 and 2023, and secured a top-10 finish at the 2022 Women's Amateur Asia-Pacific. In January 2024, she won the Honda LPGA Thailand National Qualifiers, earning a sponsor exemption to make her LPGA Tour debut as an amateur at the 2024 Honda LPGA Thailand, where she tied for 18th place. She also participated in the 2025 Augusta National Women's Amateur.

Her standout performances as an amateur earned her a scholarship to the University of Oregon, where she majored in psychology. Playing for the Oregon Ducks, she claimed her first collegiate victory at the Alice & John Wallace Classic during her 2024–25 freshman season. She also earned WGCA All-America Second Team and All-Big Ten First Team honors. In the fall of 2025, she reached No. 17 in the World Amateur Golf Ranking.

== Professional career ==
In November 2025, Vinijchaitham decided to suspend her university studies midway through her sophomore year to turn professional and compete in the final stage of the LPGA Q-School. In December, she finished tied for 24th at the LPGA Q-Series, successfully earning her LPGA Tour card for the 2026 season.

During her 2026 rookie season on the LPGA Tour, Vinijchaitham made her season debut at the Blue Bay LPGA in China, where she tied for 67th. In April, she tied for 11th at the JM Eagle LA Championship. Later that month, she made the cut in her first major championship appearance, finishing 71st at the 2026 Chevron Championship. In August, she recorded a career-best tied-for-eighth finish at the Standard Portland Classic. She shot rounds of 67, 70, 70 and 66 to finish at 15-under-par 273. Later that month at the FM Championship, she shot a career-low 7-under 65 in the second round, opening with five consecutive birdies, to finish tied for 37th.

== Amateur wins ==
- 2022 Pondok Indah International Junior Championship
- 2023 Singha Thailand Amateur Match Play Championship, Ciputra Golfpreneur Junior World Championship, SEA Amateur Team Championship
- 2025 Alice & John Wallace Classic

== Results in LPGA majors ==
Tournament	2026
Chevron Championship	71
U.S. Women's Open	
Women's PGA Championship	CUT
The Evian Championship	CUT
Women's British Open	

Did not play

CUT = missed the half-way cut

== Team appearances ==
Amateur

- Patsy Hankins Trophy (representing Asia/Pacific): 2025 (winners)
- Espirito Santo Trophy (representing Thailand): 2022, 2023
