= Louise Uma Landgraf =

French professional golfer (born 2009)

Personal information
- Nationality: France
- Born: 27 January 2009 (age 17) Surat Thani, Thailand

Career
- Sport: Golf
- Status: Amateur
- Professional wins: 1

Louise Uma Landgraf (born 27 January 2009) is a Thai-French amateur golfer. She won the 2024 British Girls U16 Amateur Golf Championship and the 2025 and 2026 Portuguese International Ladies Amateur Championship. In 2023, she won the Terre Blanche Ladies Open, an LET Access Series event, at the record young age of 14 years, 2 months and 18 days.

== Early life and amateur career ==
Landgraf was born in Thailand in 2009 and educated at British International School, Phuket. Her father, is French. She is affiliated with Kempferhof Golf Club in Plobsheim, France.

In 2022, Landgraf won the U-14 French International Golf Championship at Golf de Chantilly. She also enjoyed success in Asia, winning the Thailand Junior Development Tour Invitational, and finished runner-up at the TrustGolf Singapore Junior Masters and at the Singha Thailand Junior World Championships.

In 2023, Landgraf became the youngest winner on the LET Access Series by winning the Terre Blanche Ladies Open aged 14 years, 2 months and 18 days. She beat the previous record held by fellow Thai Atthaya Thitikul who won the 2017 Ladies European Thailand Championship at age 14 years, 4 months and 19 days. Following this breakthrough, she was invited to play in the Jabra Ladies Open and Lacoste Ladies Open de France, and represented France at the 2023 Espirito Santo Trophy in Abu Dhabi.

In 2024, Landgraf was runner-up at the 2024 Internationaux de France U21 – Trophée Esmond, and won the British Girls U16 Amateur Golf Championship at The Berkshire and the Annika Invitational Europe in Sweden, two of which are qualifying events for the 2024 Junior Solheim Cup.

== Amateur wins ==
- 2022 U-14 French International Golf Championship, Thailand Junior Development Tour Invitational
- 2023 TKG B Southern Championship, TKG STCC International #2, Junior Asian Tour, World Stars of Junior Golf Championship
- 2024 British Girls U16 Amateur Golf Championship, Annika Invitational Europe
- 2025 Portuguese International Ladies Amateur Championship, Irish Women's Open Stroke Play Championship
- 2026 Portuguese International Ladies Amateur Championship, Irish Women's Open Stroke Play Championship

== Professional wins (1) ==
=== LET Access Series wins (1) ===
No.	Date	Tournament	Winning score	To par	Margin of victory	Runners-up
1	15 Apr 2023	Terre Blanche Ladies Open (as an amateur)	69-74=143^	−1	Playoff	(Netherlands) Pasqualle Coffa (France) Charlotte Liautier

^Reduced to 36 holes due to weather

== Team appearances ==
Amateur

- Espirito Santo Trophy (representing France): 2023
- Junior Vagliano Trophy (representing the Continent of Europe): 2024, 2025
- Junior Solheim Cup (representing the Europe): 2024
- European Girls' Team Championship (representing France): 2025
- Junior Ryder Cup (representing the Europe): 2025
