= Rebecca Codd =

Irish-Australian professional golfer

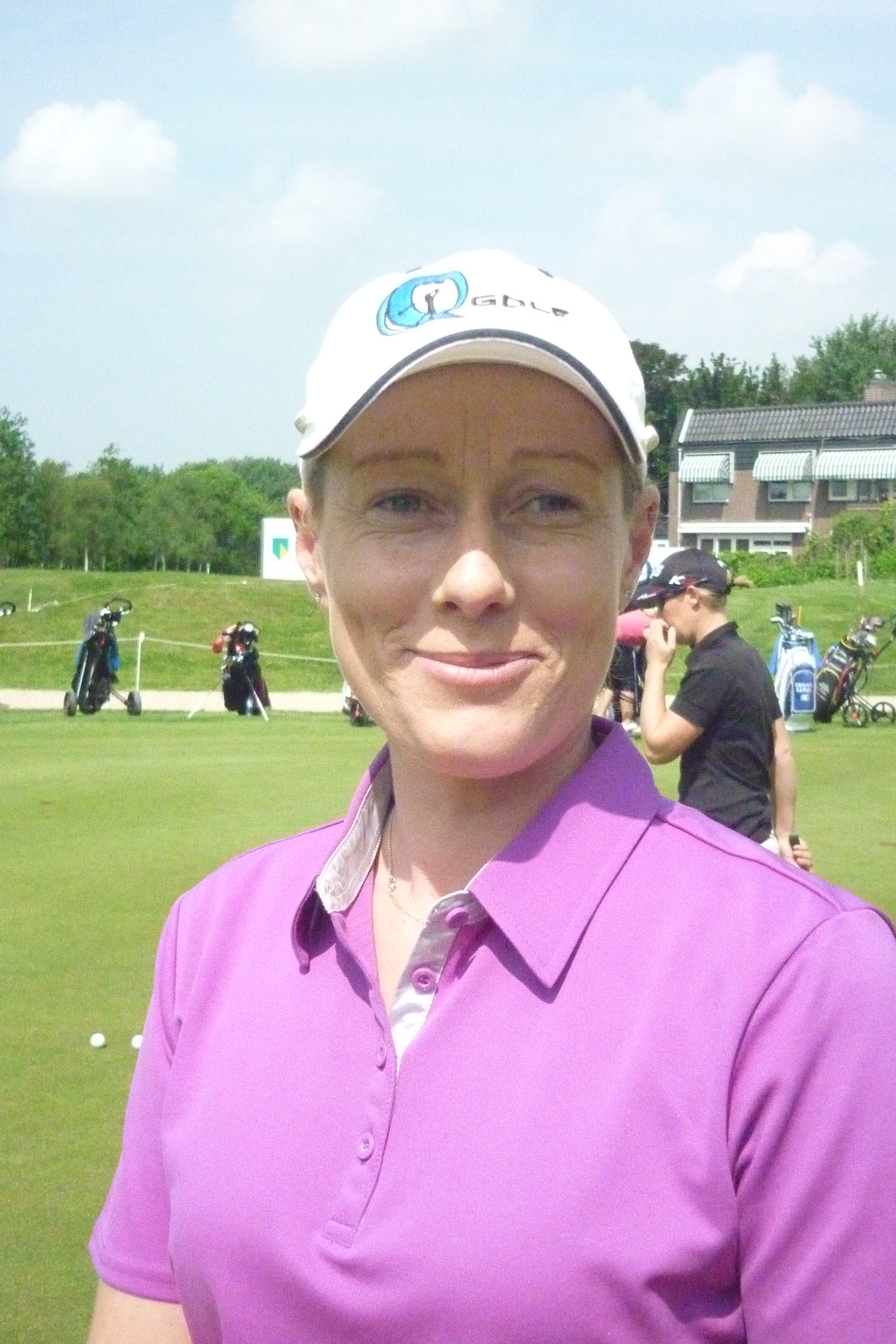
- Dutch Ladies Open 2012

Personal information
- Full name: Rebecca Coakley Codd
- Nationality: Ireland
- Born: 25 April 1981 (age 45) Adelaide, Australia
- Height: 1.65 m (5 ft 5 in)
- Spouse: Shane Codd

Career
- Sport: Golf
- Turned professional: 2002
- Former tours: Ladies European Tour; ALPG Tour

Best results in LPGA major championships
- Chevron Championship: DNP
- Women's PGA C'ship: DNP
- U.S. Women's Open: DNP
- Women's British Open: CUT: 2005, 2006, 2007, 2008, 2010, 2011, 2012
- Evian Championship: DNP

Rebecca Codd (née Coakley, born 25 April 1981) is an Irish-Australian professional golfer. She has played on the ALPG Tour and Ladies European Tour.

== Amateur wins ==
- 1998 South Australian Junior Amateur Championship
- 2000 South Australian Ladies Amateur Championship, Irish Women's Open Stroke Play Championship
- 2001 South Australian Ladies Amateur Championship
- 2002 Irish Women's Amateur Close Championship, Irish Women's Open Stroke Play Championship

== Professional ==
Codd turned professional in 2002. For the first few years, she only played in Australia where she won the 2003 Horizons ALPG Rookie of the Year. Since 2005, she also plays on the Ladies European Tour. There she has always been in the top-70 and thus has earned her playing right. She finished her first season ranked 23. She has achieved 13 top-10 places.

Her husband, Shane Codd, is also a golf professional. In 2010 he was the caddie for Becky Brewerton, although he also caddied for Laura Davies when she won the Hero Women's Indian Open in New Delhi in November 2010. He is also chairman of the Caddie's Association. On 10 January 2011, Shane and Rebecca married. They live in Carlow, Ireland.

== Team appearances ==
Amateur

- Junior Tasman Cup (representing Australia): 1999 (winners)
- Tasman Cup (representing Australia): 2001 (winners)
- Queen Sirikit Cup (representing Australia): 2002
- Burtta Cheney Cup: 1999
- Gladys Hay Memorial Cup: 1999, 2001, 2002
