= Junior Vagliano Trophy =

The Junior Vagliano Trophy is an annual girls amateur golf tournament. It is co-organised by The R&A and the European Golf Association and is contested by teams representing "Great Britain and Ireland" and the "Continent of Europe". The first event was in 2011. Originally it was played in odd-numbered years at the same time and location as the Vagliano Trophy but in 2021 it became an annual event. Girls must be under-16 on 1 January of the year of the event. The Continent of Europe won the first seven matches. The eighth match was tied but the Continent of Europe retained the Trophy. Great Britain and Ireland won for the first time in 2024.

== Format ==
The competition involves various match play matches between players selected from the two teams of 6, either singles and foursomes. The winner of each match scores a point for their team, with half a point each for any match that is tied after 18 holes. If the entire match is tied, the previously winning team retains the Trophy.

A foursomes match is a competition between two teams of two golfers. The golfers on the same team take alternate shots throughout the match, with the same ball. Each hole is won by the team that completes the hole in the fewest shots. A fourball match is a competition between two teams of two golfers. All four golfers play their own ball throughout the round. Each hole is won by the team whose individual golfer had the lowest score. A singles match is a standard match play competition between two golfers.

The contest is played over two days, with three foursomes and six singles matches on each day, a total of 18 points.

== Results ==
In 2024 the first day foursomes were not played because of bad weather.

Year	Venue	Winning team Captain	Score		Losing team Captain	Ref
2026	The Island Golf Club (Donabate, Republic of Ireland)	Continent of Europe (Netherlands) Myrte Eikenaar	9½	8½	(United Kingdom) Great Britain & (Republic of Ireland) Ireland (England) Becca Hembrough	
2025	Koninklijke Haagsche Golf & Country Club (Wassenaar, Netherlands)	Continent of Europe (Spain) Ane Urchegui	11½	6½	(United Kingdom) Great Britain & (Republic of Ireland) Ireland (Republic of Ireland) Deirdre Walsh	
2024	West Lancashire Golf Club (Blundellsands, England)	(United Kingdom) Great Britain & (Republic of Ireland) Ireland (Republic of Ireland) Deirdre Walsh	8	7	Continent of Europe (Netherlands) Myrte Eikenaar	
2023	Royal Dornoch Golf Club (Dornoch, Scotland)	Continent of Europe (Netherlands) Myrte Eikenaar	9	9	(United Kingdom) Great Britain & (Republic of Ireland) Ireland (England) Janet Melville	
2022	Blairgowrie Golf Club (Blairgowrie, Scotland)	Continent of Europe (Netherlands) Myrte Eikenaar	10	8	(United Kingdom) Great Britain & (Republic of Ireland) Ireland (England) Janet Melville	
2021	Hilversumsche Golf Club (Hilversum, Netherlands)	Continent of Europe (Netherlands) Myrte Eikenaar	14	4	(United Kingdom) Great Britain & (Republic of Ireland) Ireland (England) Janet Davies	
2019	Royal St George's Golf Club (Sandwich, England)	Continent of Europe (Spain) Ane Urchegui	10½	7½	(United Kingdom) Great Britain & (Republic of Ireland) Ireland (Republic of Ireland) Maria Dunne	
2017	Circolo Golf Bogogno (Bogogno, Italy)	Continent of Europe (Spain) Ane Urchegui	15	3	(United Kingdom) Great Britain & (Republic of Ireland) Ireland (Republic of Ireland) Claire Coughlan-Ryan	
2015	Malone Golf Club (Dunmurry, Northern Ireland)	Continent of Europe (Germany) Thea Hoffmeister	10½	7½	(United Kingdom) Great Britain & (Republic of Ireland) Ireland (England) Helen Hewlett	
2013	Golf de Chantilly (Chantilly, Oise, France)	Continent of Europe (Norway) Kristin Gunhildrud	14	4	(United Kingdom) Great Britain & (Republic of Ireland) Ireland (Scotland) Elaine Farquharson-Black	
2011	Royal Porthcawl Golf Club (Porthcawl, Wales)	Continent of Europe (Norway) Kristin Gunhildrud	13	5	(United Kingdom) Great Britain & (Republic of Ireland) Ireland (Wales) Sue Turner	

== Teams ==
=== Great Britain and Ireland ===
- 2026: (Wales) Morgan Bollan, (England) Mariella Buchanan, (Wales) Rebecca Del Sol-Gonzalez, (Wales) Alicia Kelly, (Scotland) Carly McDonald, (Scotland) Stella Walters
- 2025: (Wales) Alicia Kelly, (Northern Ireland) Hannah Lee McNamara, (England) Ellie Lichtenhein, (Scotland) Carly McDonald, (England) Annabel Peaford, (England) Emily Peaford
- 2024: (Republic of Ireland) Olivia Costello, (England) Lauren Crump, (England) Ellie Lichtenhein, (Scotland) Carly McDonald, (England) Charlotte Naughton, (England) Annabel Peaford
- 2023: (England) Sadie Adams, (Republic of Ireland) Olivia Costello, (Republic of Ireland) Kate Dillon, (Wales) Isobel Kelly, (England) Rosie Kim, (England) Chloe Tarbard
- 2022: (Scotland) Grace Crawford, (Republic of Ireland) Marina Joyce Moreno, (England) Rosie Kim, (England) Isla McDonald-O'Brien, (England) Amelia Wan, (England) Maggie Whitehead
- 2021: (Scotland) Grace Crawford, (England) Rosie Kim, (Wales) Harriet Lockley, (Northern Ireland) Katie Poots, (England) Maggie Whitehead, (England) Ellen Yates
- 2019: (Republic of Ireland) Beth Coulter, (Scotland) Hannah Darling, (Scotland) Carmen Griffiths, (Wales) Darcey Harry, (England) Patience Rhodes, (Wales) Ffion Tynan
- 2017: (Republic of Ireland) Sarah Byrne, (England) Caitlin Whitehead, (England) Lily May Humphreys, (England) Mimi Rhodes, (Wales) Ffion Tynan, (England) Carys Worby
- 2015: (Scotland) Hazel MacGarvie, (Republic of Ireland) Mairead Martin, (Scotland) Shannon McWilliam, (England) Hollie Muse, (England) Emily Price, (Republic of Ireland) Annabel Wilson
- 2013: (England) Samantha Fuller, (England) Alice Hewson, (England) Sophie Lamb, (Scotland) Fiona Liddell, (England) Sophie Madden, (Republic of Ireland) Olivia Mehaffey
- 2011: (England) Georgia Hall, (England) Charley Hull, (England) Bronte Law, (England) Amber Ratcliffe, (Scotland) Clara Young, (Wales) Chloe Williams

=== Continent of Europe ===
- 2026: (Italy) Maria Sole Albini, (France) Elea Bastoni, (Spain) Rut Díaz, (Switzerland) Lana Guyot, (Spain) Ángela Revuelta, (Estonia) Kristella Sikk
- 2025: (Spain) Adriana García, (Spain) Liz Hao, (France) Alice Kong, (France) Louise Uma Landgraf, (France) Salomé Lumbaca, (Spain) Ángela Revuelta
- 2024: (Sweden) Olivia Holmberg, (France) Alice Kong, (France) Louise Uma Landgraf, (Spain) Nagore Martínez, (Spain) Martina Navarro, (France) Lily Reitter
- 2023: (Italy) Natalia Aparicio, (Italy) Ginevra Coppa, (Poland) Kinga Kuśmierska, (Germany) Sofia Maier-Borst, (France) Marie-Élodie Prats-Rigual, (Germany) Antonia Steiner
- 2022: (Denmark) Johanna Axelsen, (Spain) Anna Cañadó, (France) Carla de Troia, (Spain) Andrea Revuelta, (Iceland) Perla Sól Sigurbrandsdóttir, (Netherlands) Lynn van der Sluijs
- 2021: (Germany) Helen Briem, (Spain) Cayetana Fernández, (Italy) Francesca Fiorellini, (France) Constance Fouillet, (Sweden) Meja Örtengren, (Sweden) Nora Sundberg
- 2019: (Slovenia) Pia Babnik, (Italy) Francesca Fiorellini, (Russia) Nataliya Guseva, (Denmark) Amalie Leth-Nissen, (Spain) Carolina López-Chacarra, (France) Lucie Malchirand
- 2017: (Italy) Caterina Don, (Spain) Blanca Fernández, (Austria) Isabella Holpfer, (Sweden) Amanda Linnér, (Italy) Alessia Nobilio, (Italy) Emilie Alba Paltrinieri
- 2015: (France) Mathilde Claisse, (Sweden) Julia Engström, (Austria) Isabella Holpfer, (Sweden) Frida Kinhult, (France) Agathe Laisné, (Austria) Emma Spitz
- 2013: (France) Mathilda Cappeliez, (France) Eva Gilly, (Hungary) Csicsi Rózsa, (Spain) Alejandra Pasarín, (Spain) Covadonga Sanjuán, (Switzerland) Albane Valenzuela
- 2011: (France) Shannon Aubert, (Spain) Clara Baena, (Germany) Quirine Eijkenboom, (Germany) Karolin Lampert, (Spain) Harang Lee, (Denmark) Emily Kristine Pedersen

== See also ==
- Vagliano Trophy
- Jacques Léglise Trophy
