= Ginger Howard =

American professional golfer (born 1994)

Personal information
- Full name: Ginger Howard
- Nationality: United States
- Born: March 15, 1994 (age 32)

Career
- Sport: Golf
- Turned professional: 2012

Ginger Howard (born March 15, 1994) is an American professional golfer. At the age of 17, she was the youngest African American golfer to turn professional. In 2010, she was the first-ever Black golfer to play on a Junior Ryder Cup team, helping Team USA to win the title in Scotland. She later became one of four African American golfers playing in the 2016 LPGA Tour.

== Early life and education ==
Howard grew up in West Philadelphia, and was introduced to golf at the age of 6 by her father, Robert, who worked as a retail manager; her mother, Gianna, worked as a nurse. In 2003, the family moved from Maryland to Florida to be closer to better golf courses.

In Florida, Howard was home-schooled in the mornings with her younger sister Robbi, and then coached at the IMG Academy in the afternoons. She later turned down offers from Duke University and Florida State University to focus on her professional golf career.

== Amateur career ==
In May 2007, at the age of 13, Howard advanced through the first stage of qualifying for the U.S. Women's Open, shooting 75 in a USGA local event at Imperial Golf Club in Naples, Florida. She qualified for a total of four U.S. Girls' Juniors. In 2010, Howard was the runner-up at the Junior PGA Championship, losing in a three-hole play-off, to earn her a spot on Team USA's Junior Ryder Cup squad. She was the first African American junior golfer named to a Ryder Cup team. In September 2010, Team USA retained the Junior Ryder Cup title by beating Europe at Gleneagles, Scotland, the first time the U.S. team had won on foreign soil.

== Professional career ==
Howard turned professional in 2012. During her rookie year, Howard won five Suncoast Series Pro titles, and finished first on the money list at the end of the season. She also played on the LPGA's development circuit, the Symetra Tour, where she was one of the youngest players on the circuit.

In December 2015, Howard earned conditional status on the LPGA Tour through qualifying school, becoming one of four African American women on the tour in 2016, and one of eight black members of the LPGA since 1964.

At the end of 2018, Howard's seventh year on the Symetra Tour, she stopped playing competitive golf to focus on rehabilitation from chronic shoulder and knee injuries.

Having returned to competitive golf, in April 2021, Howard won the Mackie Construction Ladies Professional Championship on the Women’s All Pro Tour.
