= British Girls U16 Amateur Golf Championship =

Girls U16 Amateur Championship
Tournament information
- Location: United Kingdom
- Established: 2018
- Organized by: The R&A
- Format: 54-hole stroke play
- Month played: April

Current champion
- (Hong Kong) Sabrina Wong

The Girls U16 Amateur Championship is a golf tournament for girls under 16 which is held annually in the United Kingdom. The competition is organised and run by The R&A.

== History ==
In 2018 the tournament replaced the Ladies' British Open Amateur Stroke Play Championship which was discontinued by The R&A in 2017 following the Ladies' Golf Union merger. It had been played since 1969.

The inaugural championship took place at Fulford Golf Club near York in 2018, the venue that also hosted the inaugural Women's British Open in 1976.

== Format ==
The championship consists of 54 holes of stroke play, played over three days with no cut, contested by a field of 90 players. Entry is open to female golfers who are under 16 years of age on 1 January in the year of the championship.

== Results ==
| Year | Venue | Champion | Winning score | Margin of victory | Runner(s)-up |
|---|---|---|---|---|---|
| 2025 | Gog Magog Golf Club | (Hong Kong) Sabrina Wong | 203 (–10) | 1 stroke | (Republic of Ireland) Hannah Lee-McNamara |
| 2024 | The Berkshire Golf Club | (France) Louise Uma Landgraf | 211 (−8) | Playoff | (England) Charlotte Naughton |
| 2023 | Enville Golf Club | (Germany) Antonia Steiner | 218 (+2) | Playoff | (Czech Republic) Annika Kohoutek |
| 2022 | Enville Golf Club | (Scotland) Grace Crawford | 220 (+4) | 4 strokes | (Poland) Kinga Kuśmierska, (England) Isla McDonald-O'Brien |
| 2021 | Enville Golf Club | (England) Rosie Bee Kim | 216 (E) | 2 strokes | (England) Róisín Scanlon |
| 2020 | Cancelled due to the coronavirus (COVID-19) pandemic | | | | |
| 2019 | Fulford Golf Club | (Italy) Francesca Fiorellini | 219 (−6) | 3 strokes | (Scotland) Carmen Griffiths |
| 2018 | Fulford Golf Club | (Scotland) Hannah Darling | 218 (−4) | 2 strokes | (Republic of Ireland) Beth Coulter |

== Future Venues ==
- 2026 - Gog Magog Golf Club

== See also ==
- The Women's Amateur Championship – The Ladies' British Open Amateur Championship held since 1893
- Ladies' British Open Amateur Stroke Play Championship – The predecessor tournament held 1969–2017
