= Hannah Burke =

English golfer

Personal information
- Nationality: England
- Born: 28 March 1988 (age 38) London, England
- Height: 5 ft 4 in (1.63 m)

Career
- Sport: Golf
- College: Baylor University
- Turned professional: 2011
- Current tour: Ladies European Tour (joined 2012)
- Former tour: LPGA Tour
- Professional wins: 1

Number of wins by tour
- Ladies European Tour: 1

Best results in LPGA major championships
- Chevron Championship: DNP
- Women's PGA C'ship: DNP
- U.S. Women's Open: CUT: 2016
- Women's British Open: T17: 2015
- Evian Championship: T59: 2015

Hannah Burke (born 28 March 1988) is an English professional golfer, member of the Ladies European Tour (LET) and winner of the 2015 Tipsport Golf Masters.

== Amateur career ==
Burke won the 2002 and 2003 Hertfordshire Girls Championship, the 2004 Southern Girls Championship and the 2005 Hampshire Rose. She was runner-up at the 2004 and 2005 Hertfordshire Ladies Championship, at the 2009 English Open Amateur, and the 2009 Irish Amateur Open. She won the 2010 Irish Women's Open Stroke Play Championship. In 2010 she represented England at the Espirito Santo Trophy in Argentina and the European Ladies' Team Championship in Spain.

Burke attended Baylor University in Texas and earned a degree in Exercise Physiology. She was named the 2007 Big 12 Freshman of the Year for women's golf and recorded one win in collegiate competition. She finished second individually at the 2010 Big 12 Women's Golf Championship.

== Professional career ==
In January 2012, Burke lost a playoff to finish 33rd at Ladies European Tour Q-School for the 2012 season, earning conditional LET membership, but still managed to participate in most events. In her Ladies European Tour rookie season, Burke ended the season ranked 76th on the Order of Merit and secured her card. In 2013, she posted a total of three top-10 finishes including runner-up at the Ladies Scottish Open and T3 at the Hero Women's Indian Open. She recorded her first career-low round of 64 (−6) during the first round of the Lacoste Ladies Open de France and ended the season ranked 27th on the Order of Merit. In 2014, from 20 tournaments played, Burke posted four top-10 finishes including a season-best T2 at the Hero Women's Indian Open.

Burke broke into the LET winner's circle with her maiden win at the 2015 Tipsport Golf Masters in the Czech Republic. After rounds of 68, 68 and 64 for a total of 200, 13-under-par, on the par-71 Golf Park Pilsen course, Burke finished two strokes clear of overnight co-leader Nicole Broch Larsen of Denmark. In 2016 and 2017, her best result was T9 in the Ladies Scottish Open and T8 in the Estrella Damm Mediterranean Ladies Open respectively.

Burke played six events on the 2017 LPGA Tour after she finished T44 at the 2016 LPGA Final Qualifying Tournament to earn Priority List Category 17 status for the 2017 season. Her best result was T42 at the Indy Women in Tech Championship.

In 2018, from 14 starts, her best result was T6 in the season-ending Andalucia Costa Del Sol Open De España Femenino. Burke only played in 10 tournaments in 2019 as an achilles injury halted her play in the second half of the season. She nonetheless recorded four top-10s, finishing 25th on the Order of Merit.

== Amateur wins ==
- 2002 Hertfordshire Girls Championship
- 2003 Hertfordshire Girls Championship
- 2004 Southern Girls Championship
- 2005 Hampshire Rose
- 2010 Irish Women's Open Stroke Play Championship

== Professional wins (4) ==
=== Ladies European Tour wins (1) ===
No.	Date	Tournament	Winning score	To par	Margin of victory	Runner-up	Winner's share (€)
1	7 Aug 2015	Tipsport Golf Masters	68-68-64=200	−13	1 stroke	(Denmark) Nicole Broch Larsen	37,500

== Team appearances ==
Amateur

- European Ladies' Team Championship (representing England): 2010
- Espirito Santo Trophy (representing England): 2010

Professional

- The Queens (representing Europe): 2015
