= Nora Sundberg =

Swedish golfer

Personal information
- Full name: Nora Lovisa Josefin Sundberg
- Nationality: Sweden
- Born: 30 September 2005 (age 21)

Career
- Sport: Golf
- College: Stanford University
- Status: Amateur

Achievements and awards
- Swedish Teen Tour Order of Merit: 2021, 2022

Nora Sundberg (born 30 September 2005) is a Swedish amateur golfer and Stanford Cardinal women's golf team player. She has played on the winning European teams in the Junior Ryder Cup, Junior Solheim Cup and Junior Vagliano Trophy. In 2023 she won the Spanish International Ladies Amateur Championship.

== Amateur career ==
Sundberg grew up in Stockholm and represents Stockholm Golf Club. She played in the European Young Masters in 2019 and 2020, and joined the National Team in 2021. At the European Girls' Team Championship in 2021, her team finished third. In 2022, they finished second, as the final with France ended 4–3, after beating England 6–1 in the semi-final.

In 2021, Sundberg played on the winning Junior Solheim Cup in Toledo, Ohio, captained by Annika Sörenstam, where she won, 3 and 1, over Bailey Shoemaker in her final day match. She was also on the European 2021 Junior Vagliano Trophy team that beat Janet Melville's British team in the Netherlands 14–4.

Sundberg had individual success on the Swedish Teen Tour and won six tournaments between 2018 and 2021. On her way to win the 2021 Teen Tour Elite #5 at Fullerö Golf Club, she shot a final round 63, a course record. After holding the overnight lead ahead of the final round of the Annika Invitational Europe in 2021, she finished runner-up behind Meja Örtengren. She was again runner-up at the tournament in 2022. She won the Swedish Teen Tour Order of Merit in 2021 and 2022.

In 2022, she won the Swedish Junior Strokeplay Championship as one of five titles that year. She made her Ladies European Tour debut at the 2022 Skaftö Open where she finished low amateur, tied for 22nd place.

In 2023, she was stroke play medalist and won the final of the Spanish International Ladies Amateur Championship, 2 & 1 against Savannah De Bock. She also played on the winning Junior Solheim Cup and Junior Ryder Cup teams.

== College career ==
Sundberg enrolled at Stanford University in the fall of 2024 and started playing with the Stanford Cardinal women's golf team.

== Personal life ==
Her sister Alice played college golf at Campbell University between 2018 and 2022.

Her brother Oskar played college golf at Wagner University between 2014 and 2018.

== Amateur wins ==
- 2018 Teen Tour Future #1, Teen Tour Future #2
- 2019 Ping Salem Junior Open
- 2021 Teen Tour Elite #5, Teen Tour Elite #6, Teen Tour Final
- 2022 Swedish Invitational GolfTech Tour #1, RIG&NIU Classic GolfTech Tour #2, Teen Tour Elite #1, Swedish Junior Strokeplay Championship, Teen Tour Elite #5
- 2023 Spanish International Ladies Amateur Championship

== Team appearances ==
Amateur

- European Young Masters (representing Sweden): 2019, 2020
- European Girls' Team Championship (representing Sweden): 2021, 2022, 2023
- Junior Solheim Cup (representing Europe): 2021 (winners), 2023 (winners)
- Junior Vagliano Trophy (representing the Continent of Europe): 2021 (winners)
- Junior Ryder Cup (representing Europe): 2023 (winners)
- World Junior Girls Championship (representing Sweden): 2022, 2023
- European Ladies' Team Championship (representing Sweden): 2024, 2025
- Patsy Hankins Trophy (representing Europe): 2025
