= Charlotte Naughton =

English golfer (born 2008)

Personal information
- Nationality: England
- Born: 2008 (age 17–18) Morpeth, Northumberland, England

Career
- Sport: Golf
- College: University of Texas at Austin
- Status: Amateur

Best results in LPGA major championships
- Chevron Championship: DNP
- Women's PGA C'ship: DNP
- U.S. Women's Open: DNP
- Women's British Open: CUT: 2026
- Evian Championship: DNP

Achievements and awards
- England Golf Girls' Order of Merit winner: 2025

Charlotte Naughton (born 2008) is an English amateur golfer. She won the 2026 European Ladies Amateur.

== Early life ==
Naughton hails from Morpeth, Northumberland and was educated at Ponteland High School. She represents Longhirst Hall Golf Club.

== Amateur career ==
Naughton was runner-up at the 2024 British Girls U16 Amateur Golf Championship and the 2025 Girls Amateur Championship. She was also runner-up at the St Rule Trophy in 2024 and 2025. In 2026, she finished third in the Copa Sotogrande.

In 2025, Naughton won the German Girls Open and World Junior Girls Golf Championship in Canada, and topped the English Girls' Order of Merit rankings.

In 2026, she won the European Ladies Amateur Championship at Allerum Golf Club in Sweden, two shots ahead of Meja Örtengren in second. The victory secured a place in the 2026 Women's British Open at Royal Lytham & St Annes Golf Club.

In team golf, Naughton won the 2024 European Girls' Team Championship with England. She represented Great Britain & Ireland at the 2024 Junior Vagliano Trophy, Europe at the 2025 Junior Ryder Cup, and was the youngest member of the GB&I team at the 2026 Curtis Cup.

She joined the University of Texas at Austin in 2026.

== Amateur wins ==
- 2022 England Golf U14 National Championship, Northumberland County Ladies Championship
- 2023 North of England U16 Championship, England Schools U16 National Championship, Northumberland County Ladies Championship
- 2025 German Girls Open, World Junior Girls Golf Championship (individual)
- 2026 Junior Orange Bowl International, European Ladies Amateur Championship

== Results in LPGA majors ==
Tournament	2026
Chevron Championship	
U.S. Women's Open	
Women's PGA Championship	
The Evian Championship	
Women's British Open	CUT

Did not play

CUT = missed the half-way cut
T = tied

== Team appearances ==
Amateur

- Junior Vagliano Trophy (representing Great Britain & Ireland): 2024 (winners)
- World Junior Girls Championship (representing England): 2024, 2025
- Girls and Boys Home Internationals (representing England): 2024 (winners), 2025 (winners)
- European Young Masters (representing England): 2024
- European Girls' Team Championship (representing England): 2024 (winners), 2025
- Junior Golf World Cup (representing England): 2025
- Junior Ryder Cup (representing Europe): 2025
- European Nations Cup – Copa Sotogrande (representing England): 2026
- Curtis Cup (representing the Great Britain & Ireland): 2026
- European Ladies' Team Championship (representing England): 2026
