= Helen Briem =

German golfer

Personal information
- Nationality: Germany
- Born: 12 August 2005 (age 21) Nürtingen, Stuttgart, Germany
- Height: 190 cm (6 ft 3 in)

Career
- Sport: Golf
- Turned professional: 2024
- Current tours: Ladies European Tour (joined 2024); LPGA Tour (joined 2026)
- Former tour: LET Access Series
- Professional wins: 6

Number of wins by tour
- Ladies European Tour: 2
- Other: 4

Best results in LPGA major championships
- Chevron Championship: DNP
- Women's PGA C'ship: CUT: 2026
- U.S. Women's Open: DNP
- Women's British Open: CUT: 2025, 2026
- Evian Championship: T56: 2025

Helen Briem (born 12 August 2005) is a German professional golfer and Ladies European Tour player. She won three consecutive LET Access Series tournaments and rose to number 1 in the World Amateur Golf Ranking before turning professional in July 2024. She won her first LET title at the 2024 La Sella Open.

== Amateur career ==
Briem was born in Nürtingen near Stuttgart and represents Stuttgarter Golf-Club Solitude. She had an exceptional amateur career. In 2021, she became a member of the German National Team and won the European Young Masters in Finland, both individually and with the team. Also in 2021, she won the national stroke-play and match-play titles in Germany, and was selected by captain Annika Sörenstam for the European team at the Junior Solheim Cup.

In 2022, she won the European Nations Cup – Copa Sotogrande and the Italian International Ladies Amateur Championship, and made her Augusta National Women's Amateur debut.

She shared best individual score at the 2022 Women's World Amateur Team Championships for the Espirito Santo Trophy at Le Golf National in France, with Rose Zhang and Meja Örtengren, and collected a bronze medal with the German team.

Briem recorded two runner-up finishes in three starts in professional events on the LET Access Series, at the 2021 Santander Golf Tour Barcelona, one stroke behind Charlotte Liautier, and at the 2022 Lavaux Ladies Open in Switzerland, four strokes behind Sára Kousková. She made three consecutive birdies and an eagle between holes three and six, which resulted in a score of 67 and put her in a share of the lead during the round.

In 2023, she won the Girls Amateur Championship with a record score of 12 & 10. In January 2024 she won the Portuguese International Ladies Amateur Championship, and in late May she birdied the final four holes on her way to a final round 64 to force a playoff at the Dormy Open Helsingborg, a Ladies European Tour event, won by Perrine Delacour on the first extra hole.

In June 2024, Briem, still an amateur, won three professional tournaments in a row, in three consecutive weeks, on the LET Access Series. After she won the 2024 European Ladies' Team Championship with Germany in July, she rose to number one in the World Amateur Golf Ranking.

== Professional career ==
Briem turned professional in July 2024 at age 18. Less than three months later, she won her first tournament as a professional, the Rose Ladies Open at the Melbourne Club at Brocket Hall, Hertfordshire, England on the LET Access Series. Later the same month she won the La Sella Open, her first LET title.

Briem earned her 2026 LPGA Tour card by finishing first at the LPGA Q-Series Final Qualifying in December 2025.

== Amateur wins ==
- 2021 German Match Play, European Young Masters, Golfsportmanufaktur Schäfflertanz International Open, German National Amateur
- 2022 European Nations Cup – Copa Sotogrande, Italian International Ladies Amateur Championship
- 2023 Girls Amateur Championship
- 2024 Portuguese International Ladies Amateur Championship

== Professional wins (6) ==
=== Ladies European Tour wins (2) ===
No.	Date	Tournament	Winning score	To par	Margin of victory	Runner(s)-up
1	22 Sep 2024	La Sella Open	67-71-66-66=270	−18	2 strokes	(France) Pauline Roussin-Bouchard
2	30 May 2026	Open de France Dames	69-65-67=201	−12	7 strokes	(Republic of Ireland) Sara Byrne, (Wales) Lydia Hall (Singapore) Shannon Tan

Ladies European Tour playoff record (0–1)

No.	Year	Tournament	Opponent	Result
1	2024	Dormy Open Helsingborg (as an amateur)	(France) Perrine Delacour	Delacour won with birdie on first extra hole

=== LET Access Series wins (4) ===
No.	Date	Tournament	Winning score	To par	Margin of victory	Runner-up
1	9 Jun 2024	Montauban Ladies Open (as an amateur)	70-70-69=209	−7	1 stroke	(Switzerland) Tiffany Arafi
2	16 Jun 2024	Amundi Czech Ladies Challenge (as an amateur)	72-68-73=213	−3	1 stroke	(Netherlands) Nikki Hofstede
3	22 Jun 2024	Santander Golf Tour Ávila (as an amateur)	70-62-70=202	−14	1 stroke	(Sweden) Kajsa Arwefjäll
4	8 Sep 2024	Rose Ladies Open	68-69-66=203	−13	Playoff	(England) Hannah Screen

LET Access Series playoff record (1–0)

No.	Year	Tournament	Opponent	Result
1	2024	Rose Ladies Open	(England) Hannah Screen	Won with par on third extra hole

== Results in LPGA majors ==
Tournament	2025	2026
Chevron Championship		
U.S. Women's Open		
Women's PGA Championship		CUT
The Evian Championship	T56	CUT
Women's British Open	CUT	CUT

Did not play

CUT = missed the half-way cut
T = tied

== Team appearances ==
Amateur

- Junior Solheim Cup (representing Europe): 2021 (winners), 2023 (winners)
- European Young Masters (representing Germany): 2021 (winners)
- Junior Vagliano Trophy (representing the Continent of Europe): 2021 (winners)
- European Girls' Team Championship (representing Germany): 2022
- Espirito Santo Trophy (representing Germany): 2022, 2023
- World Junior Girls Championship (representing Germany): 2022
- Vagliano Trophy (representing the Continent of Europe): 2023 (winners)
- Patsy Hankins Trophy (representing Europe): 2023 (winners)
- Junior Ryder Cup (representing Europe): 2023 (winners)
- European Ladies' Team Championship (representing Germany): 2023, 2024 (winners)
