= Fulford Golf Club =

Golf club in North Yorkshire, England

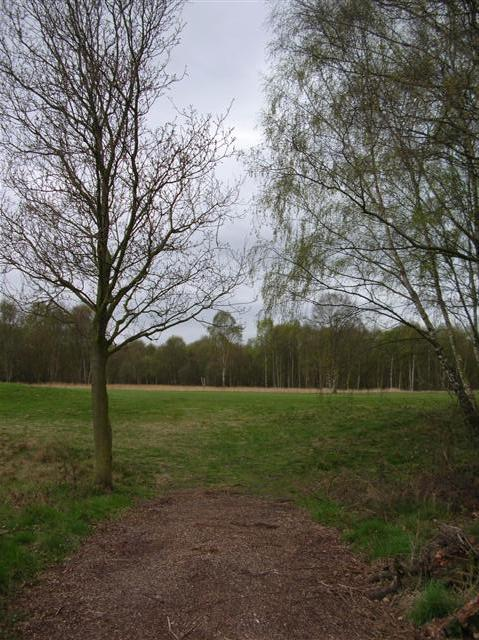

- Location within North Yorkshire
- 53.940°N 1.054°W

Club information
- Location: Fulford, North Yorkshire, England
- Established: 1906
- Tota holes: 18
- Website: www.fulfordgolfclub.co.uk

Fulford Golf Club is a private golf club located approximately 1 mile (2 km) south of York, England. It was founded in 1906, moving to its current site, which had been approved by James Braid, in 1935. The golf course was designed by Charles MacKenzie, brother of notable golf course architect Alister MacKenzie.

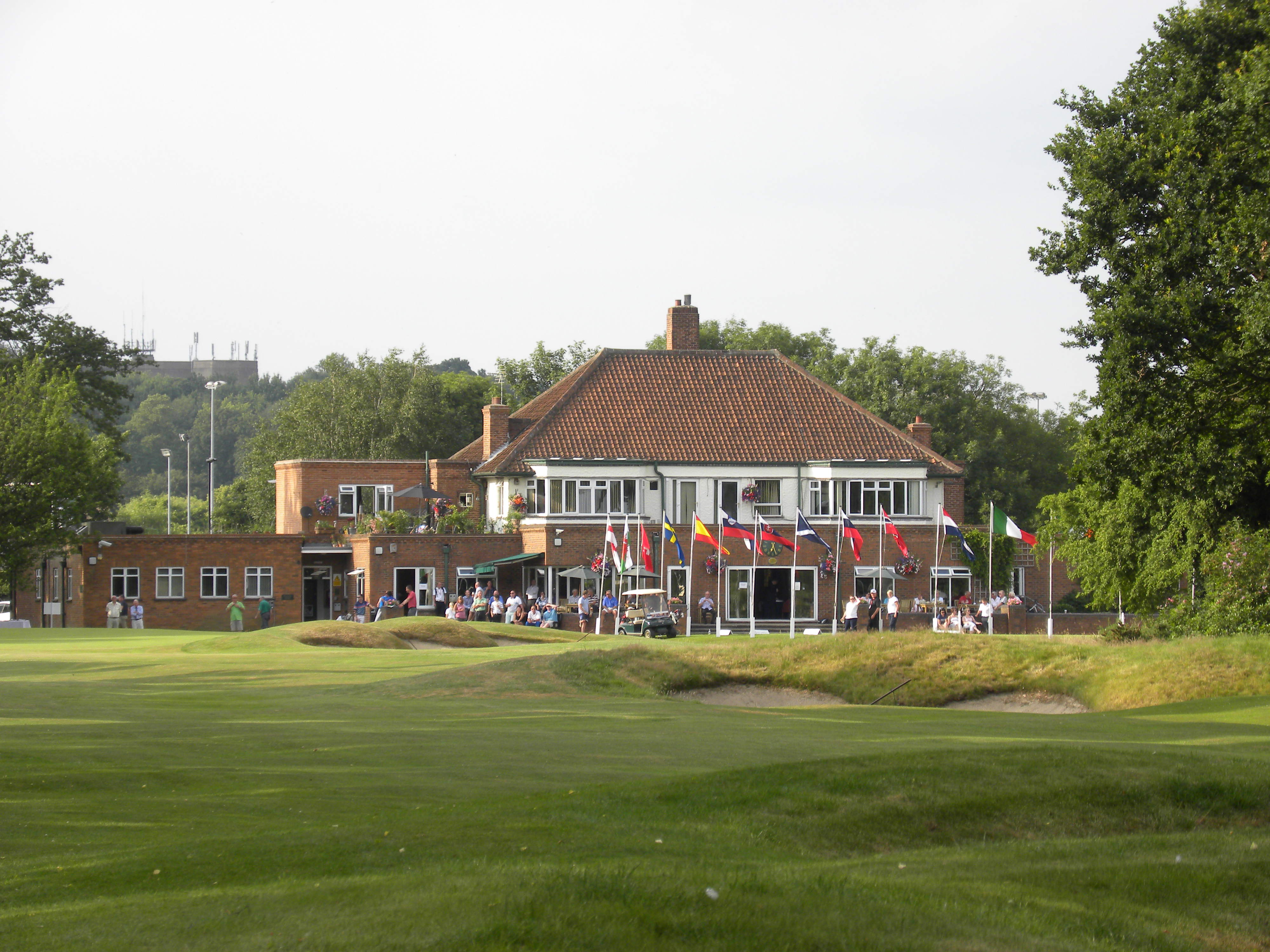
Fulford Golf Club

Fulford was home to several PGA European Tour events including the Benson and Hedges International Open between 1971 and 1989. Memorably, during the 1981 tournament, Bernhard Langer climbed the ash tree by the 17th green to play his third shot. The club also hosted the Martini International in 1967, the Sun Alliance European Matchplay Championship in 1979 and the Murphy's Cup in 1990 and 1991.

In 1976 Fulford hosted the inaugural Women's British Open, won by Jenny Lee Smith.

In recent years, Fulford has hosted a number of international amateur events including the European Ladies' Amateur Team Championship in 2013, The inaugural R&A British Girls' U16 Amateur Championship in 2018 and again in 2019, the Carris Trophy in 2018, and the Girls Amateur Championship in 2021.

On the 24th of June, 2024, Fulford held one of 15 local qualifying events for the 152nd Open Championship.
