= Junior Solheim Cup =

Tournament information
- Location: 2026: Netherlands
- Established: 2002
- Course: 2026: Bernardus Golf
- Format: Match play

Current champion
- United States

The Junior Solheim Cup is a version of the Solheim Cup for girls aged 12 to 18. It was inaugurated in 2002. It is currently officially called the PING Junior Solheim Cup. The Junior Solheim Cup follows a similar format to The Solheim Cup and features the top 12 U.S. amateur girls—defined as girls participating in American Junior Golf Association (AJGA) events—versus their European counterparts. College/university golfers are ineligible to participate in the event, even if they meet the age cutoff. The event is held over two days, with six fourball and six foursomes matches on the first day, and twelve singles matches on the second day.

Each event has been held in the general vicinity of that year's Solheim Cup. The United States has won 8 of the 13 contests, with Europe winning 4, while the 2011 match ended in a tie.

Many Junior Solheim Cup players go on to play in the Solheim Cup. Of the victorious 12-woman European side at Gleneagles in 2019, 10 members had previously played in the Junior Solheim Cup.

== Results ==
| Year | Venue | Location | Winning team | Score | USA captain | Europe captain |
|---|---|---|---|---|---|---|
| 2026 | Bernardus Golf | Netherlands | United States | 13–11 | Morgan Pressel | (Netherlands) Anne van Dam |
| 2024 | Army Navy Country Club | Virginia, USA | United States | 18 1/2–5 1/2 | Beth Daniel | (France) Gwladys Nocera |
| 2023 | La Zagaleta | Spain | Europe | 15–9 | Amy Alcott | (France) Gwladys Nocera |
| 2021 | Sylvania Country Club | Ohio, USA | Europe | 13–11 | Renee Powell | (Sweden) Annika Sörenstam |
| 2019 | Gleneagles Hotel (King's Course) | Scotland | United States | 13–11 | Mary Bea Porter-King | (England) Mickey Walker |
| 2017 | Des Moines G&CC (Composite Course #2) (Note: Neither the Solheim Cup nor the Junior Solheim Cup used the club's two courses (North and South) in the configurations played by members. The Solheim Cup used a composite course made up of nine holes from each circuit. The Junior Solheim Cup used the remaining holes for its composite course.) | Iowa, USA | United States | 14 1/2–9 1/2 | Alice Miller | (England) Alison Nicholas |
| 2015 | Golf Club St. Leon-Rot (Rot Course) | Germany | United States | 13–11 | JoAnne Carner | (Denmark) Iben Tinning |
| 2013 | Inverness Golf Club | Colorado, USA | United States | 14 1/2–9 1/2 | Kathy Whitworth | (Scotland) Janice Moodie |
| 2011 | Knightsbrook Golf Resort | Ireland | Tied United States retains (Note: The matches ended in a 12–12 tie. The rules state that in the event of a tie, the cup is retained by the team that held it before the contest.) | 12–12 | Meg Mallon | (Sweden) Liselotte Neumann |
| 2009 | Aurora Country Club | Illinois, USA | United States | 15 1/2–8 1/2 | Nancy Lopez | (Sweden) Carin Koch |
| 2007 | Båstad Golf Club | Sweden | Europe | 14–10 | Donna Andrews | (Sweden) Catrin Nilsmark |
| 2005 | The Bridgewater Club | Indiana, USA | United States | 16–8 | Colleen Walker | (Sweden) Charlotta Sörenstam |
| 2003 | Bokskogen Golf Club | Sweden | Europe | 12 1/2–11 1/2 | Val Skinner | (Sweden) Helen Alfredsson |
| 2002 | Oak Ridge Country Club | Minnesota, USA | United States | 17–7 | Sherri Steinhauer | (Spain) Marta Figueras-Dotti |

== Teams ==
=== United States ===
- 2026: Grace Carter, Madeleine Conser, Anna Fang, Honorine Ferry, Aubrey Hilgers, Amber Lee, Iris Lee, Lily Peng, Eliana Saga, Asterisk Talley, Amelie Zalsman, Kelly Zhang
- 2024 Sofia Cherif Essakali, Gianna Clemente, Anna Fang, Mia Hammond, Jude Lee, Avery McCrery, Madison Messimer, Nikki Oh, Elizabeth Rudisill, Scarlett Schremmer, Asterisk Talley, Natalie Yen
- 2023: Leigh Chien, Gianna Clemente, Anna Davis, Kathryn Ha, Irene Kim, Ryleigh Knaub, Jasmine Koo, Meghan Meng, Elisabeth Rusidill, Anna Song, Asterisk Talley, Yana Wilson
- 2021: Amari Avery, Anna Davis, Megha Ganne, Sara Im, Katie Li, Alexa Pano, Catherine Rao, Kaitlyn Schroeder, Bailey Shoemaker, Yana Wilson, Kelly Xu, Avery Zweig
- 2019: Phoebe Brinker, Zoe Antoinette Campos, Briana Chacon, Sadie Englemann, Rachel Heck, Lucy Li, Michaela Morard, Brianna Navarrosa, Alexa Pano, Amanda Sambach, Christine Wang, Rose Zhang
- 2017: Alyaa Abdulghany, Jennifer Chang, Youngin Chun, Rachel Heck, Gina Kim, Lucy Li, Emilia Migliaccio, Yealimi Noh, Kaitlyn Papp, Brooke Seay, Erica Shepherd, Rose Zhang
- 2015: Sierra Brooks, Hailee Cooper, Mariel Galdiano, Kristen Gillman, Megan Khang, Nelly Korda, Andrea Lee, Mika Liu, Haley Moore, Hannah O'Sullivan, Kaitlyn Papp, Angel Yin
- 2013: Casie Cathrea, Karen Chung, Casey Danielsson, Alexandra Kaui, Alison Lee, Amy Lee, Andrea Lee, Nicole Morales, Krystal Quihuis, Ashlan Ramsey, Samantha Wagner, Bethany Wu
- 2011: Karen Chung, Jaye Marie Green, Kyung Kim, Alison Lee, Esther Lee, Ashlan Ramsey, Summar Roachell, Mariah Stackhouse, Mckenzie Talbert, Emma Talley, Gabriella Then, Lindsey Weaver
- 2009: Sarah Brown, Ani Gulugian, Jennifer Johnson, Stephanie Kim, Jessica Korda, Alison Lee, Tiffany Lua, Kristen Park, Jane Rah, Alexandra Stewart, Lexi Thompson, Kristina Wong
- 2007: Sydney Burlison, Brianna Do, Courtney Ellenbogen, Mina Harigae, Vicky Hurst, Kimberly Kim, Stephanie Kono, Isabelle Lendl, Tiffany Lua, Kristen Park, Jane Rah, Allie White
- 2005: Jennie Arseneault, Lila Barton, Sydney Burlison, Esther Choe, Kimberly Donovan, Megan Grehan, Taylor Karle, Kimberly Kim, Sydnee Michaels, Morgan Pressel, Jane Rah, Catherina Wang
- 2003: Amanda Blumenherst, Esther Choe, Amie Cochran, Paula Creamer, Lauren Espinosa, Allison Goodman, Taylor Leon, Brittany Lincicome, Whitney Meyers, Jennifer Pandolfi, Jane Park, Christie Reed
- 2002: Amanda Blumenherst, Mallory Code, Paula Creamer, Nicole Hage, Ashley Knoll, Brittany Lang, Brittany Lincicome, Allison Martin, Jennifer Pandolfi, Jane Park, Morgan Pressel, Whitney Wade

=== Europe ===
- 2026: Lauren Crump, Adriana García Terol, Lena Geier, Axelle Guillemard, Lana Guyot, Alice Kong, Carlota López Minguela, Anna Ludvová, Sofía Maier-Borst, Marta Muñoz, Annabel Peaford, Carolina Pérez-Tasso
- 2024: Paris Appendino, Sara Brentcheneff, Benedicte Brent Buchholz, Alice Kong, Victoria Kristensen, Louise Uma Landgraf, Martina Navarro Navarro, Molly Rålin, Lily Reitter, Andrea Revuelta, Perla Sól Sigurbrandsdóttir, Havanna Torstensson
- 2023: Cloe Amión, Yana Beeli, Helen Briem, Anna Cañadó, Savannah De Bock, Francesca Fiorellini, Meja Örtengren, Andrea Revuelta, Nora Sundberg, Rocío Tejedo, Denisa Vodičková, Josefin Widal
- 2021: Helen Briem, Savannah De Bock, Cayetana Fernández, Francesca Fiorellini, Constance Fouillet, Vaïrana Heck, Amalie Leth-Nissen, Meja Örtengren, Andrea Revuelta, Paula Schulz-Hanssen, Nora Sundberg, Denisa Vodičková
- 2019: Pia Babnik, Hannah Darling, Annabell Fuller, Lily May Humphreys, Amalie Leth-Nissen, Lucie Malchirand, Benedetta Moresco, Alessia Nobilio, Anne Normann, Lilas Pinthier, Mimi Rhodes, Paula Schulz-Hanßen
- 2017: Letizia Bagnoli, Mathilde Claisse, Julia Engström, Alessandra Fanali, Linn Grant, Esther Henseleit, Frida Kinhult, Amanda Linnér, Alessia Nobilio, Emma Spitz, Maja Stark, Beatrice Wallin
- 2015: Mathilda Cappeliez, Elin Esborn, Leonie Harm, Agathe Laisné, Olivia Mehaffey, Sandra Nordaas, María Parra, Ana Peláez, Marta Pérez Sanmartin, Emma Spitz, Puk Lyng Thomsen, Albane Valenzuela
- 2013: Shannon Aubert, Virginia Elena Carta, Georgia Hall, Anyssia Herbaut, Karolin Lampert, Bronte Law, Harang Lee, Emily Kristine Pedersen, Amber Ratcliffe, Linnea Ström, Anne van Dam, Jessica Vasilic
- 2011: Emilie Alonso, Amy Boulden, Céline Boutier, Manon Gidali, Charley Hull, Emma Nilsson, Leona Maguire, Lisa Maguire, Antonia Scherer, Luna Sobrón, Lauren Taylor, Margaux Vanmol
- 2009: Anna Arrese, Rosanna Crépiat, Tonje Daffinrud, Ana Fernández de Mesa, Leona Maguire, Lisa Maguire, Sherlyn Popelka, Sophia Popov, Klára Spilková, Kelly Tidy, Johanna Tillström, Sally Watson
- 2007: Henrietta Brockway, Carlota Ciganda, Audrey Goumard, Caroline Hedwall, Jacqueline Hedwall, Charlotte Lorentzen, Sara Monberg, Nathalie Månsson, Florentyna Parker, Nicola Rössler, Marta Silva, Sally Watson. (Note: In 2007, Caroline Masson withdrew and was replaced by Jacqueline Hedwall.)
- 2005: Carlota Ciganda, Alessandra De Luigi, Lene Krog, Caroline Masson, Belén Mozo, Azahara Muñoz, Anna Nordqvist, Florentyna Parker, Beatriz Recari, Melissa Reid, Marta Silva, Bénédicte Toumpsin
- 2003: Minea Blomqvist, Emma Cabrera-Bello, Claire Grignolo, María Hernández, Pernilla Lindberg, Belén Mozo, Azahara Muñoz, Dewi Claire Schreefel, Marianne Skarpnord, Louise Stahle, Caroline Westrup, Adriana Zwank
- 2002: Carmen Alonso, Minea Blomqvist, Mélodie Bourdy, Emma Cabrera-Bello, Inés Díaz-Negrete, Claire Grignolo, María Hernández, Azahara Muñoz, Maria Recasens, Dewi Claire Schreefel, Elisa Serramià, Louise Stahle

== See also ==
- Junior Ryder Cup
