= Hannah Darling (golfer) =

Scottish professional golfer (born 2003)

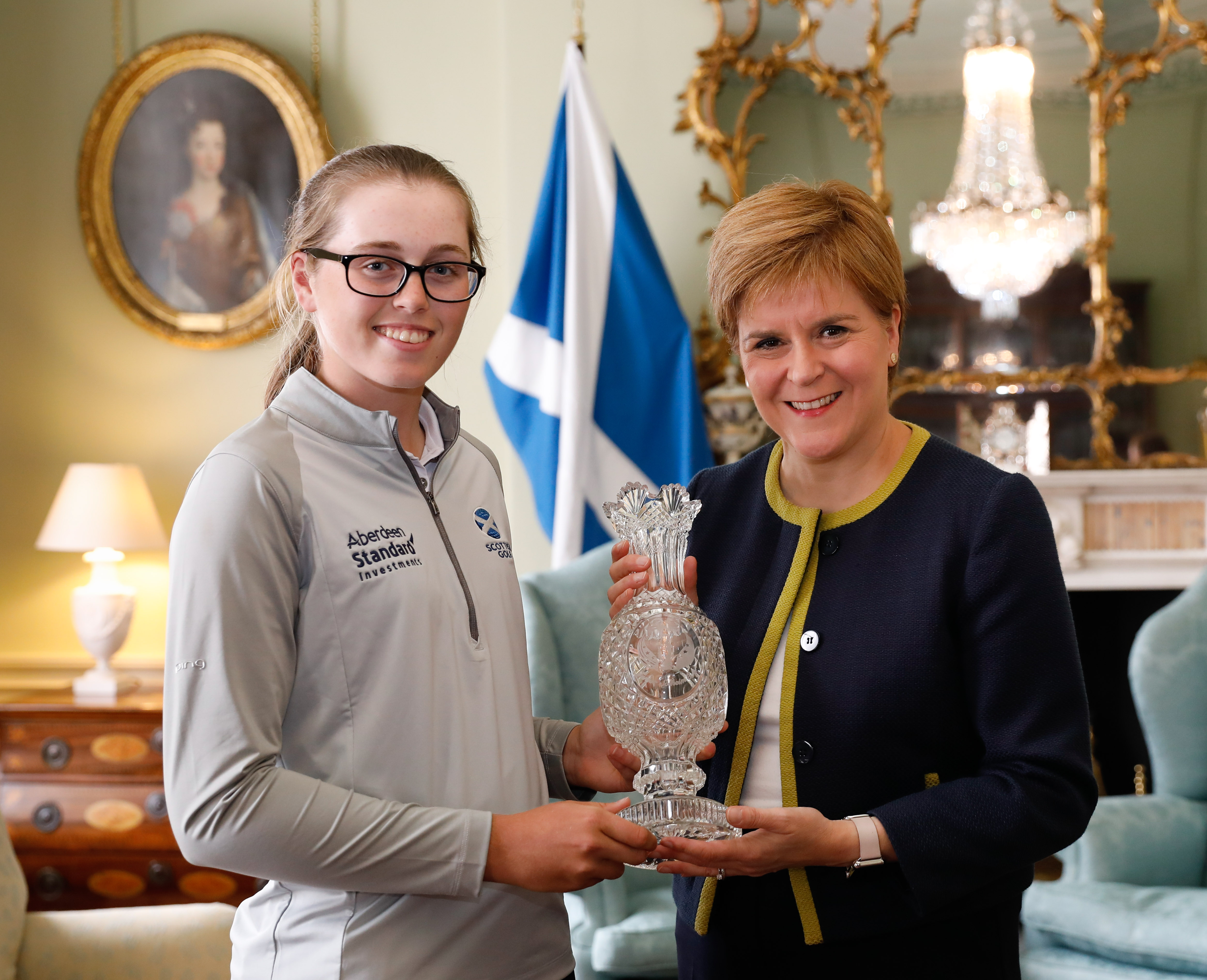
- Darling with Nicola Sturgeon in 2019

Personal information
- Nationality: Scotland
- Born: 2003 (age 22–23) Scotland

Career
- Sport: Golf
- College: University of South Carolina
- Turned professional: 2025

Hannah Darling (born July 2003) is a Scottish professional golfer. She played in the Curtis Cup in 2021, 2022 and 2024. From 2021 to 2025, she attended the University of South Carolina.

== Golf career ==
In July 2017, Darling became the youngest winner of the Scottish Girls' Amateur Championship, aged 13, and she played for Scotland in the Girls Home Internationals the following month. In 2018, she was the inaugural winner of the British Girls U16 Amateur Golf Championship, finishing two strokes ahead of Beth Coulter. She also repeated her success in the Scottish Girls' Amateur Championship, beating Louise Duncan, 4 and 3, in the final. In April 2019, she won the Scottish Girls' Open Championship with a score of 209, six strokes ahead of the runner-up. Later in 2019, she competed for Great Britain & Ireland in the Junior Vagliano Trophy, for Scotland in the European Ladies' Team Championship and the Women's Home Internationals and for Europe in the Junior Solheim Cup.

Darling had a good run of results in 2021. Between the end of May to early July, she won the St Rule Trophy, was a semi-finalist in the Scottish Women's Amateur Championship and the Women's Amateur Championship, and was a runner-up in the Helen Holm Scottish Women's Open Championship. In August, she won the Girls Amateur Championship beating Beth Coulter in the final. She also played in the 2021 Curtis Cup. Darling also had the lowest individual score in the qualifying stage of the 2021 European Ladies' Team Championship.

Since the autumn of 2021, she has attended the University of South Carolina. In 2022, she competed in the Curtis Cup for the second time, and again reached the semi-finals of the Women's Amateur Championship. She again led the individual scoring in the qualifying stage of the European Ladies' Team Championship.

Darling turned professional in July 2025.

== Amateur wins ==
- 2017 Scottish Girls' Amateur Championship
- 2018 Scottish Girls' Amateur Championship, British Girls U16 Amateur Golf Championship
- 2019 Scottish Girls' Open Championship
- 2021 St Rule Trophy, Girls Amateur Championship
- 2024 Darius Rucker Intercollegiate, Annika Intercollegiate

== Team appearances ==
Amateur

- Girls Home Internationals (representing Scotland): 2017, 2018
- European Girls' Team Championship (representing Scotland): 2018
- Junior Vagliano Trophy: (representing Great Britain & Ireland): 2019
- European Ladies' Team Championship (representing Scotland): 2019, 2021, 2022, 2023, 2025
- Women's Home Internationals (representing Scotland): 2019, 2021
- Junior Solheim Cup (representing Europe): 2019
- Curtis Cup (representing Great Britain & Ireland): 2021, 2022, 2024 (winners)
- Espirito Santo Trophy (representing Scotland): 2022, 2023
- Arnold Palmer Cup (representing International team): 2024
- Women's and Men's Home Internationals (representing Scotland): 2024
- Vagliano Trophy: (representing Great Britain & Ireland): 2025 (winners)
