= 2022 Espirito Santo Trophy =

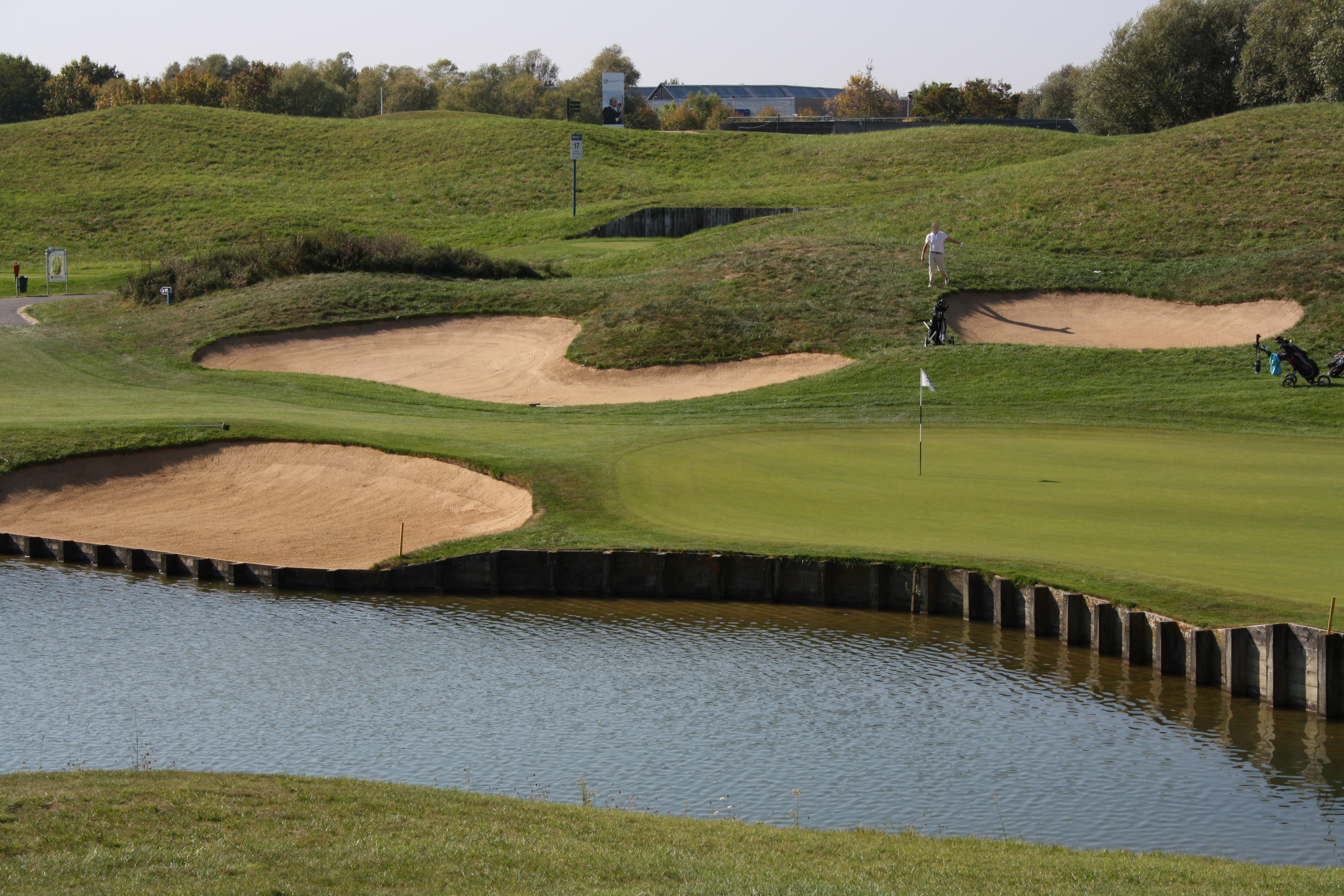
- Albatros Course at Le Golf National

Tournament information
- Dates: 24–27 August
- Location: Guyancourt, France; 48.7532°N 2.0755°E
- Courses: Le Golf National (Albatros course); Golf de Saint-Nom-la-Bretèche (Red course)
- Organized by: World Amateur Golf Council
- Format: 72 holes stroke play

Statistics
- Par: 71 (Le Golf National); 72 (Golf de Saint-Nom-la-Brèteche)
- Length: 6,317 yards (5,776 m) (Le Golf National); 6,160 yards (5,630 m) (Golf de Saint-Nom-la-Brèteche)
- Field: 56 teams 168 players

Champion
- Sweden; Ingrid Lindblad, Meja Örtengren, Louise Rydqvist
- 559 (−13)
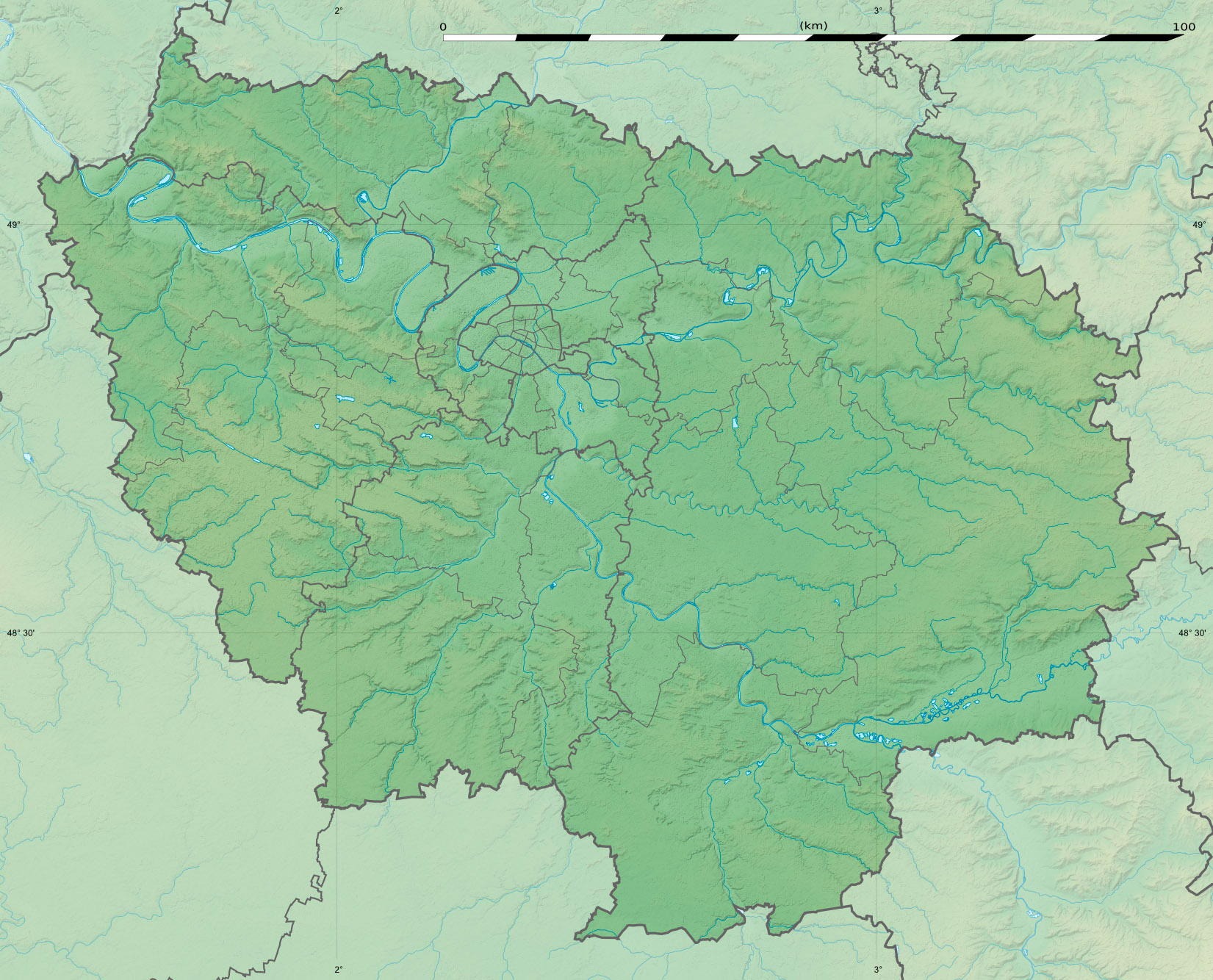
- Location in France Location in Île-de-France

The 2022 Espirito Santo Trophy took place 24–27 August at Le Golf National and Golf de Saint-Nom-la-Bretèche south-west of Paris, France.

It was the 29th women's golf World Amateur Team Championship for the Espirito Santo Trophy.

== Format ==
The tournament was a 72-hole stroke play team event. Each team of three players played two rounds at Le Golf National and two rounds at Golf de Saint-Nom-la-Bretèche in different orders. The top teams played their final round on Le Golf National, The best two scores for each round counted towards the team total.

== Venues ==
Le Golf National had previously hosted the Open de France every year except two since 1991, the 2018 Ryder Cup and the 1994 Eisenhower Trophy and Espirito Santo Trophy. The facility was scheduled to host the golfing competition during the Olympics in 2024.

Saint-Nom-la-Bretèche had previously hosted the Open de France three times and the 1963 Canada Cup, an event later renamed the World Cup.

Course layouts

Le Golf National (Albatros Course)

Hole	1	2	3	4	5	6	7	8	9	Out	10	11	12	13	14	15	16	17	18	In	Total
Metre	322	126	455	357	351	332	361	172	481	2,957	322	132	342	339	456	343	132	404	348	2,818	5,775
Yards	352	138	498	391	384	363	395	188	526	3,235	352	144	374	371	499	375	144	442	481	3,082	6,317
Par	4	3	5	4	4	4	4	3	5	36	4	3	4	4	5	4	3	4	4	35	71

Golf de Saint-Nom-la-Bretèche (Red Course)

Hole	1	2	3	4	5	6	7	8	9	Out	10	11	12	13	14	15	16	17	18	In	Total
Metre	317	362	135	340	429	338	454	315	133	2,823	339	320	447	176	314	312	154	424	325	2,811	5,634
Yards	347	396	148	372	469	370	496	344	145	3,087	371	350	489	192	343	341	168	464	355	3,073	6,160
Par	4	4	3	4	5	4	5	4	3	36	4	4	5	3	4	4	3	5	4	36	72

== Teams ==
56 teams entered the event and completed the competition. Each team had three players.

Players in the teams

Country	Players
Argentina	Ela Belén Anacona, María Cabanillas, Valentina Rossi
Australia	Kelsey Bennett, Maddison Hinson-Tolchard, Kirsten Rudgeley
Austria	Johanna Ebner, Isabella Holpfer, Anna Neumayer
Belgium	Sophie Bert, Savannah De Bock, Céline Manche
Brazil	Valentina Bosselmann, Marina Nonaka, Nina Rissi
Canada	Nicole Gal, Lauren Kim, Brooke Rivers
Chinese Taipei	Huai-Chien Hsu, Ting-Hsuan Huang, Hsin-Chun Liao
Chile	Florencia Dufey, Michelle Melandri, Amelia Ruiz
Colombia	María José Marín, Ana Murcia, Valery Plata
Costa Rica	Victoria Callahan, Veronica Odio, Scarlet Weidig
Czech Republic	Patricie Macková, Agata Váhalová, Denisa Vodičková
Denmark	Cecilie Finne-Ipsen, Sofie Kibsgaard Nielsen, Amalie Leth-Nissen
England	Charlotte Heath, Caley McGinty, Lottie Woad
Estonia	Anete Liis Adu, Elizaveta Sofia Reemet, Karola Soe
Finland	Anna Backman, Katri Bakker, Krista Junkkar
France	Constance Fouillet, Vaïrana Heck, Maylis Lamoure
Germany	Helen Briem, Alexandra Försterling, Celina Sattelkau
Guam	Tyanna Jacot, Kayley Kang, Rose Tarpley
Guatemala	Beatriz Arenas, Hani Lee, Jasmine Youn Shin
Hong Kong	Chloe Chan, Arianna Lau, Inara Sharma
Iceland	Andrea Bergsdóttir, Hulda Clara Gestsdóttir, Ragnhildur Kristinsdóttir
Ireland	Beth Coulter, Anna Foster, Lauren Walsh
Italy	Francesca Fiorellini, Carolina Melgrati, Benedetta Moresco
Japan	Saki Baba, Mizuki Hashimoto, Miku Ueta
Kazakhstan	Islamiya Abeldi, Albina Agayeva, Rivekka Jumagulova
Latvia	Katrina Bulkovska, Laila Forstmane, Marlena Gavare
Liechtenstein	Anna Eggenberger, Lisa Sele, Christine Tinner-Rampone
Lithuania	Saulė Jarašūnaitė, Miglė Rusteikaitė, Gilė Bitė Starkutė
Luxembourg	Marie Baertz, Marie Binninger, Lisa Steingrube
Mexico	Isabel Amezcua, Lauren Daiana Olivares, Clarisa Temelo
Morocco	Malak Bouraeda, Sofia Cherif Essakali, Rim Imni
Netherlands	Anne-Sterre den Dunnen, Lauren Holmey, Mayka Hoogeboom
New Zealand	Eunseo Choi, Vivian Lu, Fiona Xu
Norway	Mia Sandtorv Lussand, Vilde Marie Nystrøm, Silje Ohma
Panama	Carla Alvarez Perez, Anna Gabriela Furnar, Maria Eugenia Furnari Deleuze
Philippines	Mikhaela Fortuna, Lois Kaye Go, Maria Rafaela Singson
Poland	Maja Ambroziak, Kinga Kuśmierska, Dorota Zalewska
Portugal	Sofia Barroso Sá, Leonor Medeiros, Ana Costa Rodrigues
Puerto Rico	Camila Negroni, Valeria Pacheco, Paola Rosario
Scotland	Hannah Darling, Chloé Goadby, Lorna McClymont
Singapore	Aloysa Margiela Atienza, Hailey Loh, Jaymie Ng
Slovakia	Katarina Drocarova, Michaela Vávrová, Antónia Zacharovská
Slovenia	Barbara Car, Inja Fric, Lana Malek
South Africa	Bobbi Brown, Caitlyn Macnab, Kajal Mistry
South Korea	Shinsil Bang, Min Byeol Kim, Jiyoo Lim
Spain	Carolina López-Chacarra, Cayetana Fernández, Paula Martín Sampedro
Sweden	Ingrid Lindblad, Meja Örtengren, Louise Rydqvist
Switzerland	Elena Moosmann, Caroline Sturdza, Chiara Tamburlini
Thailand	Eila Galitsky, Navaporn Soontreeyapas, Suvichaya Vinijchaitham
Turkey	İrem Demir, Ilgın Zeynep Denizci, Zeynep Süalp
Ukraine	Maria Fedorowycz, Sofia Pylypenko, Elvira Rastvortseva
United States	Rachel Heck, Rachel Kuehn, Rose Zhang
Uruguay	Victoria Bargo, Lousiane Gauthier, Jimena Marques
Venezuela	Agatha Alesson, Stephanie Gelleni, Vanessa Gilly
Wales	Darcey Harry, Ellen Nicholas, Ffion Tynan

== Winners ==
Team Sweden won the trophy for their third title. Silver medalist and defending champion, team United States, had the same total score, but Sweden was declared the winner. The initial tiebreaker, the final round non-counting score of the respective teams, was in the favor of Sweden, 73 against 74. This was the third time in the history of the championship, the winner was decided after a tie. Last time, in 2006, Sweden lost the championship in a similar way.

Team Germany and team Japan shared the bronze on third place one stroke back.

Although there was no official recognition, Meja Örtengren, Sweden, Rose Zhang, United States and Helen Briem, Germany tied for the low individual score at seven-under-par 279.

== Results ==
Team standings

Place	Country	Score	To par
1st place, gold medalist(s)	Sweden *	143-134-143-139=559	−13
2nd place, silver medalist(s)	United States	137-142-140-140=559	−13
3rd place, bronze medalist(s)	Germany	138-141-136-145=560	−12
3rd place, bronze medalist(s)	Japan	143-138-141-138=560	−12
5	Spain	141-142-138-140=561	−11
6	Chinese Taipei	140-142-137-147=566	−6
T7	Canada	146-141-140-143=570	−2
T7	Scotland	150-141-137-142=570	−2
T9	Czech Republic	145-143-141-143=572	E
T9	South Korea	146-138-146-142=572	E
T11	England	143-143-142-145=573	+1
T11	France	143-145-134-151=573	+1
13	Switzerland	141-142-147-144=574	+2
14	Australia	140-146-142-147=575	+3
15	South Africa	141-145-146-148=580	+8
T16	Ireland	146-149-142-146=583	+11
T16	Norway	142-148-145-148=583	+11
18	Italy	151-144-142-147=584	+12
19	Netherlands	146-144-142-153=585	+13
T20	New Zealand	147-150-146-143=586	+14
T20	Thailand	146-150-144-146=586	+14
22	Finland	143-152-142-152=589	+17
23	Poland	141-148-152-151=592	+20
24	Belgium	146-151-150-146=593	+21
25	Argentina	148-144-151-151=594	+22
T26	Colombia	147-149-155-144=595	+23
T26	Denmark	153-151-149-142=595	+23
T26	Hong Kong	152-143-147-153=595	+23
29	Wales	146-154-151-146=597	+25
30	Philippines	144-153-151-150=598	+26
31	Slovakia	152-147-149-151=599	+27
32	Mexico	148-150-151-152=601	+29
33	Iceland	151-150-150-151=602	+30
34	India	148-153-150-152=603	+31
35	Venezuela	150-150-156-150=606	+34
36	Austria	151-154-148-156=609	+37
37	Uruguay	150-153-157-150=610	+38
T38	Morocco	147-156-152-158=613	+41
T38	Singapore	148-159-155-151=613	+41
40	Portugal	156-155-151-152=614	+42
41	Slovenia	151-146-161-160=618	+46
42	Chile	151-162-158-158=629	+57
T43	Brazil	153-159-163-156=631	+59
T43	Estonia	157-157-162-155=631	+59
45	Kazakhstan	160-157-158-157=632	+60
T46	Guatemala	156-151-164-166=637	+65
T46	Puerto Rico	148-155-169-165=637	+65
T46	Turkey	156-165-152-164=637	+65
T49	Latvia	160-159-155-169=643	+71
T49	Ukraine	165-162-155-161=643	+71
51	Lithuania	151-171-158-165=645	+73
52	Panama	157-164-164-166=651	+79
53	Luxembourg	167-166-159-176=668	+96
54	Costa Rica	164-170-173-165=672	+100
55	Guam	171-167-170-166=674	+102
56	Liechtenstein	173-165-176-168=682	+110

* Sweden was awarded the tiebreak, since their third player, Louise Rydqvist, had a lower score than United States' third player, Rachel Kuehn, in the final round, 73 against 74.

Individual leaders

There was no official recognition for the lowest individual scores.

Place	Player	Country	Score	To par
T1	Helen Briem	Germany	69-72-66-72=279	−7
T1	Meja Örtengren	Sweden	69-68-72-70=279	−7
T1	Rose Zhang	United States	69-72-69-69=279	−7
T4	Saki Baba	Japan	74-67-69-70=280	−6
T4	Hannah Darling	Scotland	74-71-65-70=280	−6
T4	Ingrid Lindblad	Sweden	74-66-71-69=280	−6
T7	Cayetana Fernández	Spain	72-71-68-71=282	−4
T7	Hsin-Chun Liao	Chinese Taipei	69-69-70-74=282	−4
T7	Paula Martin Sampedro	Spain	71-71-71-69=282	−4
T10	Min Byeol Kim	South Korea	72-68-72-73=285	−1
T10	Rachel Kuehn	United States	70-70-71-74=285	−1
T10	Maylis Lamoure	France	75-71-67-72=285	−1
T10	Brooke Rivers	Canada	75-70-71-69=285	−1

== See also ==
- 2022 Eisenhower Trophy
