= Amanda Linnér =

Swedish golfer (born 2001)

Personal information
- Full name: Elsa Amanda Linnér
- Nationality: Sweden
- Born: 14 February 2001 (age 25) Värmdö, Sweden

Career
- Sport: Golf
- College: Arizona State University; Florida Atlantic University
- Turned professional: 2024
- Current tours: LET Access Series; Swedish Golf Tour
- Professional wins: 1

Best results in LPGA major championships
- Chevron Championship: DNP
- Women's PGA C'ship: DNP
- U.S. Women's Open: CUT: 2021
- Women's British Open: DNP
- Evian Championship: DNP

Achievements and awards
- WGCA All-American Scholar: 2021, 2022, 2023, 2024

Elsa Amanda Linnér (born 14 February 2001) is a Swedish professional golfer, noted for her amateur success. In 2017 she won the European Girls' Team Championship, the Vagliano Trophy, the French International Lady Juniors Amateur Championship and the Annika Invitational Europe. In 2018 she won the European Ladies' Team Championship and a professional event on the Swedish Golf Tour.

== Amateur career ==
Linnér joined the Swedish National Team in 2016 and represented her country at the European Girls' Team Championship, were Sweden was runner-up in 2016 and winner in 2017. She was part of the Swedish team winning the 2018 European Ladies' Team Championship, along with Linn Grant, Frida Kinhult, Sara Kjellker, Maja Stark and Beatrice Wallin.

She also excelled individually. In 2017 Linnér finished third at the Helen Holm Scottish Women's Open Championship, won the Annika Invitational Europe and the French International Lady Juniors Amateur Championship (Internationaux de France U21 - Tropee Esmond), and was runner-up at the Annika Invitational USA.

Linnér was a member of the 2017 European Junior Solheim Cup team and represented the Continent of Europe on the winning 2017 Vagliano Trophy team. In 2018 she was a member of the European Junior Ryder Cup team and represented Europe in the Patsy Hankins Trophy, held at the Doha Golf Club in Qatar.

She represented Sweden at the 2018 Summer Youth Olympics in Buenos Aires, Argentina.

In 2019, she participated in the inaugural Augusta National Women's Amateur and won a professional tournament for the first time, the Lindbytvätten Masters on the Swedish Golf Tour.

Linnér started at Arizona State University as a mid-year addition in 2020, joining compatriot Linn Grant on the Arizona State Sun Devils golf team In 2023–24 she did a graduate degree at Florida Atlantic University, and was named WGCA All-American Scholar for the fourth consecutive year.

She earned a spot at the 2021 U.S. Women's Open through the qualifier at Superstition Mountain.

== Professional career ==
Linnér turned professional after she graduated from college in May 2024 and joined the LET Access Series.

== Amateur wins ==
- 2013 Skandia Tour Regional #3
- 2015 Torslanda Junior Open, Skandia Cup (F14)
- 2016 Skandia Tour Elit #2
- 2017 French International Lady Juniors Amateur Championship, Annika Invitational Europe

== Professional wins (1) ==
=== Swedish Golf Tour wins (1) ===
| No. | Date | Tournament | Winning score | To par | Margin of victory | Runner-up |
|---|---|---|---|---|---|---|
| 1 | 27 Sep 2019 | Lindbytvätten Masters (as an amateur) | 68-66-73=207 | −9 | 3 strokes | (Sweden) Amanda Lindahl |

== Results in LPGA majors ==
| Tournament | 2021 |
|---|---|
| ANA Inspiration | |
| U.S. Women's Open | CUT |
| Women's PGA Championship | |
| The Evian Championship | |
| Women's British Open | |

Did not play

CUT = missed the half-way cut

== Team appearances ==
Amateur

- European Girls' Team Championship (representing Sweden): 2016, 2017 (winners)
- European Ladies' Team Championship (representing Sweden): 2018 (winners)
- Vagliano Trophy (representing the Continent of Europe): 2017 (winners)
- Junior Solheim Cup (representing Europe): 2017
- Junior Ryder Cup (representing Europe): 2018
- Patsy Hankins Trophy (representing Europe): 2018
- Summer Youth Olympics Mixed team event (representing Sweden): 2018
