= 2021 U.S. Women's Open =

Golf tournament

Tournament information
- Dates: June 3–6, 2021
- Location: San Francisco, California; 37.7099°N 122.5000°W
- Courses: The Olympic Club; Lake Course
- Organized by: USGA
- Tour: LPGA Tour

Statistics
- Par: 71
- Length: 6,486 yards (5,931 m)
- Field: 156 players, 66 after cut
- Cut: 148 (+6)
- Prize fund: $5.5 million
- Winner's share: $1.0 million

Champion
- (Philippines) Yuka Saso
- 280 (−4)
- Location in the United States Location in California

The 2021 U.S. Women's Open was the 76th U.S. Women's Open, played June 3–6, 2021 at The Olympic Club in San Francisco, California.

The U.S. Women's Open is the oldest of the five current major championships and was the second of the 2021 season. It has the largest purse in women's golf at $5.5 million.

The winner was the Philippines' Yuka Saso, who defeated Japan's Nasa Hataoka on the third hole of a sudden-death playoff after both players had tied at 280 (4 under par). In third place was American Lexi Thompson, who had held a five stroke lead just before the midway point of the final round but dropped five strokes on the back-nine, including bogeys on each of the last two holes, to miss the playoff by one stroke.

== Venue ==
The 2021 U.S. Women's Open was played on The Olympic Club's Lake course, which had previously hosted the men's U.S. Open five times. It was the first time the tournament had been in California since 2016, when it took place at CordeValle Golf Club.

=== Course layout ===
Hole	1	2	3	4	5	6	7	8	9	Out	10	11	12	13	14	15	16	17	18	In	Total
Yards	528	382	209	396	432	420	263	154	380	3,193	392	411	398	171	410	137	563	485	326	3,293	6,486
Par	5	4	3	4	4	4	4	3	4	35	4	4	4	3	4	3	5	5	4	36	71

=== Yardage by round ===
Round	Hole	1	2	3	4	5	6	7	8	9	Out	10	11	12	13	14	15	16	17	18	In	Total
Round	Par	5	4	3	4	4	4	4	3	4	35	4	4	4	3	4	3	5	5	4	36	71
1st	Yards	535	381	196	395	431	388	260	148	386	3,120	393	387	372	176	398	136	557	498	325	3,242	6,362
2nd	Yards	528	389	188	403	422	379	269	162	381	3,121	394	417	384	134	406	144	565	484	334	3,262	6,383
3rd	Yards	527	386	196	388	438	385	229	156	374	3,079	400	375	402	184	415	99	566	490	328	3,259	6,338
Final	Yards	534	375	191	402	426	419	271	147	384	3,149	384	415	376	144	412	132	558	441	314	3,176	6,325

== Field ==
The field for the U.S. Women's Open is made up of players who gain entry through qualifying events and those who are exempt from qualifying. The exemption criteria include provision for recent major champions, winners of major amateur events, and leading players in the Women's World Golf Rankings. 156 players will make up the field.

=== Exemptions ===
This list details the exemption criteria for the 2021 U.S. Women's Open and the players who qualified under them; (Note: (a) – denotes amateur) any additional criteria under which players are exempt is indicated in parentheses.

1. Recent winners of the U.S. Women's Open (2011–2020)

- Choi Na-yeon
- Chun In-gee (7,15)
- Ariya Jutanugarn (2,8,10,15)
- Kim A-lim (2,10,15)
- Brittany Lang
- Lee Jeong-eun (2,15)
- Inbee Park (2,9,10,15)
- Park Sung-hyun (6,15)
- Ryu So-yeon (5,9,15)
- Michelle Wie West

2. The leading ten players, and those tying for tenth place, in the 2020 U.S. Women's Open

- Moriya Jutanugarn (9,15)
- Megan Khang (15)
- Ko Jin-young (5,7,10,14,15)
- Amy Olson (9,15)
- Kaitlyn Papp (a)
- Hinako Shibuno (8,15)

3. The winner of the 2020 U.S. Women's Amateur

- Rose Zhang (a,13)

4. The runner-up in the 2020 U.S. Women's Amateur (Note: Normally, this category includes winners of the U.S. Girls' Junior and U.S. Women's Mid-Amateur, but neither was held in 2020.) (Note: Players qualifying in these categories must remain an amateur through the conclusion of the U.S. Open.)

- ~~Gabriela Ruffels~~ (Note: Ruffels forfeited her exemption by turning professional.)

5. Recent winners of the ANA Inspiration (2017–2021)

- Mirim Lee (10,15)
- Pernilla Lindberg
- Patty Tavatanakit (10,14,15)

6. Recent winners of the Women's PGA Championship (2017–2020)

- Hannah Green (15)
- Danielle Kang (9,10,14,15)
- Kim Sei-young (9,10,14,15)

7. Recent winners of Evian Championship (2016–2019)

- Anna Nordqvist (9,15)
- Angela Stanford (9,10)

8. Recent winners of Women’s British Open (2016–2020)

- Georgia Hall (9,10,15)
- In-Kyung Kim
- Sophia Popov (10,15)

9. The leading 30 players from the 2020 LPGA Race to the CME Globe final points standings

- Céline Boutier (15)
- Ashleigh Buhai (15)
- Carlota Ciganda (15)
- Austin Ernst (10,14,15)
- Jodi Ewart Shadoff
- Ally Ewing (10,15)
- Nasa Hataoka (15)
- Brooke Henderson (10,15)
- Stacy Lewis (10,15)
- Cheyenne Knight
- Lydia Ko (10,14,15)
- Nelly Korda (10,14,15)
- Jennifer Kupcho (15)
- Minjee Lee
- Gaby López (15)
- Yealimi Noh (15)
- Park Hee-young
- Mel Reid (10,15)
- Madelene Sagström (15)
- Jennifer Song (15)
- Thidapa Suwannapura

10. Winners of official LPGA Tour events from the originally scheduled date of the 2020 U.S. Women's Open to the start of the 2021 tournament

- Hsu Wei-Ling
- Kim Hyo-joo (15)
- Jessica Korda (14,15)

11. The winner of the 2021 Augusta National Women's Amateur

- Tsubasa Kajitani (a)

12. The winner of the 2020 Women's Amateur Championship

- Aline Krauter (a)

13. The winner of the Mark H. McCormack Medal in 2020

14. The leading 10 players on the 2021 Race to CME Globe points standings as of April 14, 2021

- Lexi Thompson (15)

15. The leading 75 players on the Women's World Golf Rankings as of April 14, 2021

- Marina Alex
- Brittany Altomare
- Shanshan Feng
- Kristen Gillman
- Charley Hull
- M. J. Hur
- Ji Eun-hee
- Lee Da-yeon
- Lee Mi-hyang
- Liu Yu
- Nanna Koerstz Madsen
- Caroline Masson
- Emily Kristine Pedersen
- Lizette Salas
- Yuka Saso
- Angel Yin
- Amy Yang
- Choi Hye-jin and Ryu Hae-ran did not play.

16. The leading 75 players on the Women's World Golf Rankings not otherwise exempt as of May 17, 2021

- Lin Xiyu
- Jenny Shin
- Yuna Nishimura and Miyū Yamashita did not play.

17. The leading player from the 2020 China LPGA Tour order of merit not otherwise exempt as of April 14, 2021

- Yin Ruoning

18. The top four finishers in the 2020 South African Women's Open

- Nicole Garcia
- Leonie Harm
- Karolin Lampert
- Lee-Anne Pace

19. The leading two players from the 2020 LPGA of Korea Tour order of merit not otherwise exempt as of April 14, 2021

20. Special exemptions

- Paula Creamer
- Cristie Kerr

=== Qualifying ===
The championship is open to any female professional or amateur golfer with a USGA or World Handicap System index not exceeding 2.4. Players may qualify by competing in tournaments of over 36 holes held between April 21 and May 13, 2021, at 22 designated sites. The following table details the players who qualified.

Date	Location	Venue	Field	Spots	Qualifiers
Apr 26	Yokohama, Japan	Yokohama Country Club	107	5	Chihiro Kogure (a), Miname Katsu, Hikari Kawamitsu, Momoka Miyake, Natsumi Nakanish
Apr 26	Woodburn, Oregon	Oga Golf Course	53	2	Luna Sobrón, Monica Vaughn (a)
Apr 26	Ormond Beach, Florida	Oceanside Country Club	56	2	Kim Métraux, Megan Osland
Apr 26	Half Moon Bay, California	Half Moon Bay Golf Links	71	3	Lucy Li, Kathleen Scavo, Kelly Tan
Apr 26	Beaumont, California	Morongo Golf Resort	76	5	Pajaree Anannarukarn, Alison Lee, Wichanee Meechai, Sarah Jane Smith, Linnea Ström
Apr 27	Alexandria, Virginia	Belhaven Country Club	63	3	Sarah Kemp, Emily Mahar (a), Aneka Seumanutafa (a)
Apr 28	St. Peters, Missouri	Old Hickory Golf Club	41	2	Maja Stark (a), Emma Talley
Apr 29	Dekalb, Illinois	Kishwaukee Country Club	47	2	Abbey Daniel (a), Céline Herbin
May 3	Bradenton, Florida	Bradenton Country Club	69	3	Alyssa Lamoureux (a), Elizabeth Szokol, Karoline Tuttle (a)
May 3	Mendota Heights, Minnesota	Somerset Country Club	33	2	Sarah Burnham, Isabella McCauley (a)
May 3	Humble, Texas	Golf Club of Houston	70	3	Gurleen Kaur (a), Park Boh-yun (a), Tseng Tsai-Ching
May 3	Novato, California	Marin Country Club	50	2	Rachel Heck (a), Jaclyn LaHa (a)
May 3	Brentwood, California	Brentwood Country Club	77	4	Amari Avery (a), Jenny Coleman, Amelia Garvey (a), Haley Moore
May 3	Atlanta, Georgia	Druid Hills Golf Club	54	3	Hung Jo-Hua (a), Alexandra Swayne (a), Ana Peláez Triviño (a)
May 4	Pittsburgh, Pennsylvania	Shannopin Country Club	49	2	Jensen Castle (a), Allie White
May 4	Southern Pines, North Carolina	Mid Pines Inn & Golf Club	72	3	Haylee Harford, Gina Kim (a), Lauren Stephenson
May 5	Dedham, Massachusetts	Dedham Country & Polo Club	38	2	Christina Kim, Noemie Paré (a)
May 10	Westminster, Colorado	The Ranch Country Club	39	2	Matilda Castren, Louise Stahle
May 10	Honolulu, Hawaii	Oahu Country Club	40	2	Tiffany Chan, Claire Choi (a)
May 10	Spring Lake, New Jersey	Spring Lake Country Club	48	2	Megha Ganne (a), Cheyenne Woods
May 10	Corinth, Texas	Oakmont Country Club	67	3	Ingrid Gutiérrez Núñez, Kim Kaufman, Rebecca Lee-Bentham
May 11	West Palm Beach, Florida	Banyan Cay Resort & Country Club	61	3	Chloe Kovelesky (a), Azahara Muñoz, María Parra
May 13	Gold Canyon, Arizona	Superstition Mountain Golf Club	63	6	Mina Harigae, Amanda Linnér (a), Stephanie Meadow, Giulia Molinaro, Pornanong Phatlum, Sarah Schmelzel

==== Alternates who gained entry ====
The following players gained a place in the field having finished as the leading alternates in the specified final qualifying events:

- Addie Baggarly (a, Ormond Beach)
- Cheng Ssu-Chia (Half Moon Bay)
- Daniela Darquea (St. Peters)
- Leigha Devine (a, Spring Lake)
- Muni He (Woodburn)
- Minori Nagano (a, Bradenton)
- Natalie Srinivasan (Southern Pines)
- Ayako Uehara (Beaumont)
- Britney Yada (Westminster)

== Round summaries ==
=== First round ===
Thursday, June 3, 2021

Place	Player	Score	To par
T1	(United States) Megha Ganne (a)	67	−4
T1	(England) Mel Reid	67	−4
T3	(Canada) Brooke Henderson	68	−3
T3	(United States) Megan Khang	68	−3
T3	(United States) Angel Yin	68	−3
T6	(China) Shanshan Feng	69	−2
T6	(Philippines) Yuka Saso	69	−2
T6	(United States) Lexi Thompson	69	−2
T9	(United States) Marina Alex	70	−1
T9	(United States) Austin Ernst	70	−1
T9	(South Korea) Ko Jin-young	70	−1
T9	(United States) Jennifer Kupcho	70	−1
T9	(South Korea) Lee Jeong-eun	70	−1
T9	(Thailand) Wichanee Meechai	70	−1
T9	(United States) Lauren Stephenson	70	−1

=== Second round ===
Friday, June 4, 2021

Place	Player	Score	To par
1	(Philippines) Yuka Saso	69-67=136	−6
2	(South Korea) Lee Jeong-eun	70-67=137	−5
T3	(United States) Megan Khang	68-70=138	−4
T3	(United States) Megha Ganne (a)	67-71=138	−4
5	(China) Shanshan Feng	69-70=139	−3
T6	(South Korea) Inbee Park	71-69=140	−2
T6	(United States) Lexi Thompson	69-71=140	−2
T6	(England) Mel Reid	67-73=140	−2
T9	(Japan) Nasa Hataoka	72-69=141	−1
T9	(Thailand) Ariya Jutanugarn	71-70=141	−1
T9	(Sweden) Maja Stark (a)	71-70=141	−1

=== Third round ===
Saturday, June 5, 2021

Place	Player	Score	To par
1	(United States) Lexi Thompson	69-71-66=206	−7
2	(Philippines) Yuka Saso	69-67-71=207	−6
T3	(United States) Megha Ganne (a)	67-71-72=210	−3
T3	(South Korea) Lee Jeong-eun	70-67-73=210	−3
5	(China) Shanshan Feng	69-70-72=211	−2
T6	(Japan) Nasa Hataoka	72-69-71=212	−1
T6	(United States) Megan Khang	68-70-74=212	−1
8	(South Korea) Inbee Park	71-69-73=213	E
T9	(United States) Angel Yin	68-79-67=214	+1
T9	(South Korea) Kim Hyo-joo	72-70-72=214	+1
T9	(Sweden) Maja Stark (a)	71-70-73=214	+1

=== Final round ===
Sunday, June 6, 2021

Place	Player	Score	To par	Money ($)
T1	(Philippines) Yuka Saso	69-67-71-73=280	−4	Playoff
T1	(Japan) Nasa Hataoka	72-69-71-68=280	−4	Playoff
3	(United States) Lexi Thompson	69-71-66-75=281	−3	381,974
T4	(China) Shanshan Feng	69-70-72-71=282	−2	245,394
T4	(United States) Megan Khang	68-70-74-70=282	−2	245,394
6	(United States) Angel Yin	68-79-67-70=284	E	197,751
T7	(Canada) Brooke Henderson	68-78-69-70=285	+1	147,265
T7	(Thailand) Ariya Jutanugarn	71-70-74-70=285	+1	147,265
T7	(South Korea) Ko Jin-young	70-74-72-69=285	+1	147,265
T7	(China) Lin Xiyu	72-74-72-67=285	+1	147,265
T7	(South Korea) Inbee Park	71-69-73-72=285	+1	147,265

==== Scorecard ====
Hole	1	2	3	4	5	6	7	8	9	10	11	12	13	14	15	16	17	18
Par	5	4	3	4	4	4	4	3	4	4	4	4	3	4	3	5	5	4
(Philippines) Saso	−6	−4	−2	−2	−2	−2	−3	−3	−3	−3	−2	−2	−2	−2	−2	−3	−4	−4
(Japan) Hataoka	−2	−2	−2	−2	−2	E	−1	−2	−2	−2	−1	−1	−2	−3	−3	−4	−4	−4
(United States) Thompson	−8	−7	−7	−7	−8	−8	−8	−8	−8	−8	−6	−6	−6	−5	−5	-5	−4	−3
(China) Feng	−2	−2	−2	−2	−3	−3	−3	−3	−4	−4	−4	−3	−3	−3	−3	−3	−2	−2
(United States) Khang	−1	E	−1	−1	−2	−2	−2	−2	−2	−3	−2	−2	−2	−3	−3	−2	−3	−2
(United States) Yin	E	E	E	E	E	E	−2	−2	−3	−3	−3	−3	−1	−1	−1	E	E	E
(Canada) Henderson	+2	+2	+2	+2	+1	+1	+1	E	+1	+1	+2	+2	+2	+2	+3	+3	+1	+1
(Thailand) Jutanugarn	+2	+2	+2	+2	+3	+3	+4	+4	+4	+4	+4	+4	+4	+3	+2	+1	+1	+1
(South Korea) Ko	+2	+3	+3	+3	+3	+3	+3	+3	+2	+2	+2	+2	+1	+1	+1	+1	+1	+1
(China) Lin	+4	+5	+5	+6	+5	+5	+5	+5	+4	+4	+3	+3	+3	+3	+3	+2	+1	+1
(South Korea) Park	E	+1	+1	+1	+2	+3	+3	+2	+2	+3	+3	+2	+1	+1	+1	+1	+1	+1

Cumulative tournament scores, relative to par

Eagle	Birdie	Bogey	Double Bogey

=== Playoff ===
Place	Player	Score	To par	Money ($)
1	(Philippines) Yuka Saso	4-4-3=11	−1	1,000,000
2	(Japan) Nasa Hataoka	4-4-4=12	E	536,500

- Two-hole aggregate playoff on holes 9 and 18 before a sudden-death playoff on hole 9

==== Scorecard ====
Hole	9	18	9
Par	4	4	4
(Philippines) Saso	E	E	−1
(Japan) Hataoka	E	E	E

Cumulative playoff scores, relative to par
