= Polly Mack =

German professional golfer (born 1999)

Personal information
- Full name: Polly Annika Mack
- Nationality: Germany
- Born: 26 February 1999 (age 27) Berlin, Germany
- Height: 172 cm (5 ft 8 in)

Career
- Sport: Golf
- College: University of Nevada, Las Vegas; University of Alabama
- Turned professional: 2022
- Current tours: LPGA Tour (joined 2023); Ladies European Tour (joined 2023)
- Former tour: Epson Tour (joined 2022)

Best results in LPGA major championships
- Chevron Championship: CUT: 2023, 2024
- Women's PGA C'ship: CUT: 2024, 2026
- U.S. Women's Open: DNP
- Women's British Open: CUT: 2026
- Evian Championship: CUT: 2026

Achievements and awards
- German Junior Golf Tour Order of Merit winner: 2016
- Mountain West Player of the Year: 2018
- Mountain West Freshman of the Year: 2018

Polly Annika Mack (born 26 February 1999) is a German professional golfer and member of the LPGA Tour and Ladies European Tour. She won the 2023 LET Q-School at La Manga.

== Amateur career ==
In 2016, Mack was the German National Champion and won the RB German Junior Championship, to finish first in the German Junior Golf Tour rankings.

Mack competed for the German National team between 2017 and 2021. She appeared at the European Ladies' Team Championship three times, finishing 5th in 2018 and 4th in 2019.

Mack accepted an athletic scholarship to the University of Nevada, Las Vegas and played with the UNLV Rebels women's golf team for two seasons between 2017 and 2019. She had an outstanding freshman campaign and became the first Rebel to earn both Mountain West Player and Freshman of the Year honors in the same season. She recorded two career individual tournament wins.

She then transferred to the University of Alabama and played with the Alabama Crimson Tide women's golf team for three seasons between 2019 and 2022. In 2022, she won twice and played in the NCAA Division I Women's Golf Championships, after she became the first Crimson Tide player to win an NCAA regional since Stephanie Meadow in 2013.

== Professional career ==
Mack turned professional after graduating in 2022 and joined the Epson Tour mid-season. She made eight cuts in 11 events and finished 32nd in the rankings, recording two top-10s including a season-best solo third place at the French Lick Charity Championship. She finished 4th at the Amundi German Masters, tied with Linn Grant, two strokes behind Maja Stark.

Mack secured a place on the 2023 LPGA Tour by finishing T15 at Q-Series and on the 2023 Ladies European Tour by winning the LET Q-School at La Manga in Spain, alongside compatriot Alexandra Försterling.

== Amateur wins ==
- 2016 RB German Junior, German National Amateur
- 2019 Battle at Boulder Creek I, Mountain View Collegiate
- 2022 Liz Murphey Collegiate Classic, NCAA Franklin Regional

== Results in LPGA majors ==
Tournament	2023	2024	2025	2026
Chevron Championship	CUT	CUT		
U.S. Women's Open				
Women's PGA Championship		CUT		CUT
The Evian Championship				CUT
Women's British Open				CUT

Did not play

CUT = missed the half-way cut

== Team appearances ==
Amateur

- European Ladies' Team Championship (representing Germany): 2018, 2019, 2021
