= Jessica Karlsson =

Swedish professional golfer (born 1992)

Personal information
- Nationality: Sweden
- Born: 25 August 1992 (age 34) Karlstad, Sweden

Career
- Sport: Golf
- Turned professional: 2012
- Current tour: LET (joined 2013)
- Former tours: LET Access Series; Swedish Golf Tour

Jessica Karlsson (born 25 August 1992) is a Swedish professional golfer and member of the Ladies European Tour (LET). In 2022, she was runner-up at the Amundi German Masters and won the team event at the Aramco Team Series – New York.

== Family and early life ==
Karlsson was born in Karlstad in 1992 and started playing golf at age 9. Her brother Kristoffer Karlsson, born in 1990, is also a professional golfer and has played on the Nordic Golf League. He is her coach since 2015.

== Career ==
Karlsson enjoyed success on the junior circuit and won four tournaments between 2008 and 2010, on the Skandia Tour and the Junior Masters Invitational (JMI) tour. After graduating high school in 2010, she decided to forego the popular U.S. college route and train at home to become a professional golfer in Europe. She turned professional in 2012 and earned limited status for the 2013 Ladies European Tour, where she made two cuts in five starts. She finished T5 at the Sölvesborg Ladies Open, a LETAS event, where she trailed winner Heather MacRae of Scotland by two strokes.

Karlsson spent 2014 and 2015 honing her game on the Swedish Golf Tour. Her best finish on that tour came later, in 2019, when she lost the final of the Swedish Matchplay Championship to Emma Svensson.

Karlsson broke through internationally when she finished T5 at the 2016 Fatima Bint Mubarak Ladies Open in Abu Dhabi, which helped her finish 70th in the LET Order of Merit and earn a full LET card for 2017. In 2017, 2018 and 2019, she finished 62nd, 52nd and 59th, respectively, on the LET Order of Merit, before sitting out the pandemic-plagued 2020 season completely.

=== 2021 ===
When she returned in 2021, her game had taken a step up. She chased a maiden LET title at the 2021 Dubai Moonlight Classic, where she shared the lead with LPGA Tour player María Fassi ahead of the final round. She was 6th in the team event of the Aramco Team Series – Sotogrande together with Karolin Lampert and Nicole Garcia, and finished top-10 at the Lacoste Ladies Open de France, the Estrella Damm Ladies Open and the Open de España Femenino.

=== 2022 ===
In June 2022, Karlsson fired a career-best round of 63 to hold a three stroke lead at nine-under-par after the first day of the Amundi German Masters. She carded a bogey-free round with six birdies in her first nine holes and three birdies in her final five holes. In the second round she extended her lead to four strokes, at a total of 13-under-par. The third day ended with a one-shot lead. She led until the 72nd and final hole where a bogey meant she finished in second place, one stroke behind compatriot Maja Stark who fired a sensational approach which was a whisker away from dropping in for eagle.

In July, Karlsson took the lead with a seven-under-par 65 in the opening round of the Estrella Damm Ladies Open, alongside 2019 champion Carlota Ciganda, and five shots ahead of defending champion Maja Stark. She ultimately finished 11th. Karlsson was again in contention at the Women's Irish Open, tied for second, one stroke behind leader Anne Van Dam, after three rounds. A final round of 73 saw her finish 14th, five strokes away from the playoff won by Klára Spilková.

In August, she finished tied 3rd at the Skaftö Open, two strokes behind winner Linn Grant, firing a second round of 64. In October, she won the team event at the Aramco Team Series – New York together with Johanna Gustavsson and Karolin Lampert, one stroke ahead of a team captained by Nelly Korda.

=== 2023 ===
In March 2023, Karlsson announced she had sustained a knee injury (meniscus) and was scheduled to undergo surgery, potentially missing much of the season.

== Amateur wins ==
- 2008 Skandia Tour Regional #1 – Örebro
- 2009 Skandia Tour Riks #5 – Bohuslän/Dalsland, Billerud JMI Masters
- 2010 Skandia Tour riks #6 – Västergötland
