= 2020 Swedish Golf Tour (women) =

35th season of the Swedish Golf Tour (women)

2020 Swedish Golf Tour season
- Duration: May 2020 – September 2020
- Number of official events: 5
- Most wins: 1
- Order of Merit winners: (Denmark) Line Toft Hansen (Sweden) Louise Rydqvist (a)

The 2020 Swedish Golf Tour was the 35th season of the Swedish Golf Tour, a series of professional golf tournaments for women held in Sweden.

== Schedule ==
The season saw an attempt to rebrand the existing set of tournaments as a pan-Nordic tour, and launch the Nordic Golf Tour (NGT). However, due to the COVID-19 pandemic the events outside Sweden were cancelled and the remaining Swedish events were removed from the 2020 LET Access Series (LETAS) schedule. Most tournaments held in Sweden went ahead, but with a reduced purse.

=== Swedish Golf Tour ===
| Date | Tournament | Venue | Winner | Purse (SEK) | Tour | Ref |
|---|---|---|---|---|---|---|
| Cancelled | Ljunghusen Links Open | Ljunghusen Golf Club | | 100,000 | | |
| Cancelled | Tjörn Open | Tjörn Golf Club | | 100,000 | | |
| 9 Sep | Johannesberg Open | Johannesberg Golf Club | (Sweden) Louise Rydqvist (a) | 80,000 | | |
| 12 Sep | Hagge Open | Hagge Golf Club | (Denmark) Line Toft Hansen | 80,000 | | |
| Cancelled | Arninge Open | Arninge Golf Club | | 150,000 | | |

==== Ranking ====
The ranking was shared between Line Toft Hansen and Louise Rydqvist.

| Rank | Player | Events | Result |
|---|---|---|---|
| T1 | (Denmark) Line Toft Hansen | 2 | 22,400 |
| T1 | (Sweden) Louise Rydqvist (a) | 1 | 22,400 |

=== Nordic Golf Tour ===
| Date | Tournament | Venue | Winner | Purse (SEK) | Tour | Ref |
|---|---|---|---|---|---|---|
| Cancelled | Danish Ladies Open | (Denmark) Hillerod Golf Club | | €40,000 | ~~LETAS~~ | |
| Cancelled | Moss & Rygge Open | (Norway) Moss & Rygge Golf Club | | 425,000 | | |
| 25 Jul | GolfUppsala Open | GolfUppsala Söderby | (Sweden) Linn Grant (a) | ~~€40,000~~; 250,000 | ~~LETAS~~ | |
| Cancelled | Anna Nordqvist Västerås Open | Västerås Golf Club | | €35,000 | ~~LETAS~~ | |
| 8 Aug | Golfhäftet Masters | Varberg Golf Club | (Sweden) Ingrid Lindblad (a) | 150,000 | | |
| 15 Aug | Allerum Open | Allerum Golf Club | (Sweden) Sara Kjellker (a) | ~~€42,000~~; 150,000 | ~~LETAS~~ | |
| 22 Aug | PGA Championship | Tegelberga Golf Club | (Sweden) Elin Arvidsson (a) | ~~€40,000~~; 250,000 | ~~LETAS~~ | |
| 30 Aug | Didriksons Skaftö Open | Skaftö Golf Club | (Sweden) Ingrid Lindblad (a) | ~~€60,000~~; 300,000 | ~~LETAS~~ | |
| 9 Oct | SM Match | Ekerum Golf & Resort | (Sweden) Linn Grant (a) | 250,000 | | |

Swedish PGA Championship
Swedish Matchplay Championship

==== Ranking ====
The ranking, named the Road to Creekhouse Ladies Open, was won by Linn Grant, who earned an invitation to the Creekhouse Ladies Open at Kristianstad Golf Club on the 2021 Ladies European Tour.

| Rank | Player | Events | Result |
|---|---|---|---|
| 1 | (Sweden) Linn Grant (a) | 5 | 172,500 |
| 2 | (Sweden) Ingrid Lindblad (a) | 4 | 107,150 |
| 3 | (Sweden) Beatrice Wallin (a) | 3 | 90,500 |
