= Sara Kjellker =

Swedish professional golfer (born 1998)

Personal information
- Full name: Sara Cecilia Kjellker
- Nationality: Sweden
- Born: 7 September 1998 (age 28) Höllviken, Sweden

Career
- Sport: Golf
- College: San Diego State University
- Turned professional: 2022
- Current tour: Ladies European Tour (joined 2023)
- Former tour: LET Access Series
- Professional wins: 2

Best results in LPGA major championships
- Chevron Championship: DNP
- Women's PGA C'ship: DNP
- U.S. Women's Open: DNP
- Women's British Open: CUT: 2024
- Evian Championship: DNP

Achievements and awards
- Mountain West Conference Golfer of the Year: 2021
- PGA of Sweden Future Fund Award: 2024

Sara Cecilia Kjellker (born 7 September 1998) is a Swedish professional golfer and Ladies European Tour player. She was runner-up at the 2023 Hero Women's Indian Open. As an amateur, she won twice on the Swedish Golf Tour and was European Ladies' Team Champion twice.

== Amateur career ==
Kjellker joined the National Team in 2016 and was part of a golden era of Swedish success in European team championships. With the team, which often included Linn Grant, Frida Kinhult, Ingrid Lindblad, Beatrice Wallin and Maja Stark, she was runner-up at the 2016 European Girls' Team Championship in Norway, and won the European Ladies' Team Championship back to back in 2018 and 2019, and lost the final to England in 2021.

She won the 2017 Swedish Junior Matchplay Championship and finished third at the 2021 European Ladies Amateur.

Kjellker accepted a golf scholarship to San Diego State University, where her brother Emil was already playing with the San Diego State Aztecs men's soccer team. She started playing with the San Diego State Aztecs women's golf team in the fall of 2017. In 2019, Kjellker was runner-up at the Mountain West Championship and she won the event in 2021. In her senior year, she was an All-American and named the Mountain West Conference Women's Golfer of the Year, becoming the third Aztec to win the award.

Playing in a few tournaments on the Swedish Golf Tour, Kjellker won the 2018 Carpe Diem Beds Trophy held at her home course Ljunghusen Golf Club. In 2019, she was runner-up at the Åhus Open at Kristianstad Golf Club, and in 2020 she won her second professional title, the Allerum Open, an event removed from LETAS schedule due to the COVID-19 pandemic.

== Professional career ==
Kjellker turned professional after graduating in 2022, and joined the LET Access Series. She also made three starts on the Ladies European Tour, where she tied for 8th at the Åland 100 Ladies Open in Finland.

Kjellker finished tied 34th at Q-School, and joined the 2023 Ladies European Tour with conditional status. She tied for 7th in her first event, the Magical Kenya Ladies Open, alongside fellow rookie Amalie Leth-Nissen. At the La Sella Open in Spain she shot a course record 64 (–8) in round one and a 70 in round two to hold a two stroke lead heading into the final round, where she carded a 76 to finish in a tie for 9th. She recorded five top-5 finishes, including as runner-up at the Hero Women's Indian Open, and ended her rookie season 12th on the LET Order of Merit and 3rd in the Rookie of the Year rankings, behind Trichat Cheenglab and Alexandra Försterling.

== Amateur wins ==
- 2011 Skandia Tour Skåne Södra #2
- 2012 Götenehus Short Game Masters
- 2013 Aspero Halland Junior Open, Tallskottet Elit
- 2016 Bushnell Ljunghusen Open, PGA Junior Open by Titleist
- 2017 Swedish Junior Matchplay Championship, Norberg Open
- 2020 GCAA Amateur Series - Nevada
- 2021 Mountain West Conference Championship

== Professional wins (2) ==
=== Swedish Golf Tour wins (2) ===
No.	Date	Tournament	Winning score	To par	Margin of victory	Runner(s)-up	Ref
1	30 May 2018	Carpe Diem Beds Trophy (as an amateur)	72-71-68=211	−5	3 strokes	(Sweden) Lisa Pettersson	
2	14 Aug 2020	Allerum Open (as an amateur)	67-68-69=204	−12	1 stroke	(Sweden) Louise Rydqvist (a) (Sweden) Linda Lundqvist	

== Team appearances ==
Amateur

- European Girls' Team Championship (representing Sweden): 2016
- European Ladies' Team Championship (representing Sweden): 2018 (winners), 2019 (winners), 2021
