= Kiira Riihijärvi =

Finnish professional golfer

Personal information
- Nationality: Finland
- Born: 29 April 1997 (age 29) Mont-Saint-Aignan, France
- Height: 5 ft 11 in (180 cm)

Career
- Sport: Golf
- College: University of Tampa
- Turned professional: 2021
- Current tour: LPGA Tour (joined 2023)
- Former tour: Epson Tour (joined 2022)
- Professional wins: 1

Number of wins by tour
- Epson Tour: 1

Achievements and awards
- Sunshine State Conference Player of the Year: 2019
- NCAA Division II Player of the Year: 2020

Kiira Riihijärvi (born 29 April 1997) is a Finnish professional golfer. In 2022, she won Ann Arbor's Road to the LPGA on the Epson Tour, and finished 4th on the money list to graduate to the LPGA Tour.

== Amateur career ==
Riihijärvi was raised in Oulu, Finland and attended Darlington School in Rome, Georgia, graduating in 2016. She attended the University of Tampa between 2016 and 2021. Playing golf with the Tampa Spartans women's golf team, she was named All-American four times and won 12 events. She was Sunshine State Conference Player of the Year as a junior, and NCAA Division II Player of the Year as a senior.

Riihijärvi represented Finland at the 2018 Espirito Santo Trophy, and several times at the European Ladies' Team Championship. She won the Finnish Amateur Championship in 2019 and 2020.

She finished 28th at the 2021 Augusta National Women's Amateur, and her highest World Amateur Golf Ranking was #18.

== Professional career ==
Riihijärvi turned professional after graduating in 2021. In July, she appeared in her home country's Ladies European Tour event, the Gant Ladies Open, and finished 8th, six strokes behind winner Matilda Castren.

In 2022, she joined the Epson Tour, where she grabbed her first professional win at Ann Arbor's Road to the LPGA in June. In August, she lost a playoff at the Four Winds Invitational. She finished 4th in the rankings to graduate to the LPGA Tour for 2023.

== Amateur wins ==
- 2017 NCAA D2 Super Region 2
- 2018 Finnish U21 Stroke Play Championship
- 2019 SSC Championship, Finnish Amateur Championship, Lady Falcon Invitational, NSU Shark Invitational
- 2020 Peggy Kirk Bell Invitational, Finnish Stroke Play Championship, Finnish Amateur Championship
- 2021 Peggy Kirk Bell Invitational, Barry University Invitational, NCAA D2 South Regional

== Professional wins (1) ==
=== Symetra Tour wins (1) ===
No.	Date	Tournament	Winning score	To par	Margin of victory	Runner-up
1	16 Jun 2022	Ann Arbor's Road to the LPGA	68-69-69=206	−10	2 strokes	(Thailand) Pavarisa Yoktuan

== Team appearances ==
Amateur

- European Ladies' Team Championship (representing Finland): 2017, 2018, 2019
- Espirito Santo Trophy (representing Finland): 2018
