= 2018 European Ladies' Team Championship =

Golf competition

Tournament information
- Dates: 10–14 July 2018
- Location: Frohnleiten, Austria; 47.230°N 15.324°E
- Course: Golfclub Murhof
- Organized by: European Golf Association
- Format: 36 holes stroke play Knock-out match-play

Statistics
- Par: 72
- Length: 6.300 yards (5.761 m)
- Field: 19 teams 114 players

Champion
- Sweden; Linn Grant, Frida Kinhult, Sara Kjellker, Amanda Linnér, Maja Stark, Beatrice Wallin
- Qualification round: 703 (−17); Final match 5–2

Location map
- Location in Europe Location in Austria Location in Styria

The 2018 European Ladies' Team Championship took place 10–14 July at Golfclub Murhof, in Frohnleiten, Austria. It was the 35th women's golf amateur European Ladies' Team Championship.

== Venue ==
The club was founded in 1963 and its course, located 15 kilometers north of Graz in Styria, Austria, was constructed by Dr. Bernhard von Limburger.

The championship course was set up with par 72.

== Format ==
All participating teams played two qualification rounds of stroke-play with six players, counted the five best scores for each team.

The eight best teams formed flight A, in knock-out match-play over the next three days. The teams were seeded based on their positions after the stroke-play. The first placed team was drawn to play the quarter-final against the eight placed team, the second against the seventh, the third against the sixth and the fourth against the fifth. In each match between two nation teams, two 18-hole foursome games and five 18-hole single games were played. Teams were allowed to switch players during the team matches, selecting other players in to the afternoon single games after the morning foursome games. Teams knocked out after the quarter-finals played one foursome game and four single games in each of their remaining matches. Games all square after 18 holes were declared halved, if the team match was already decided.

The eight teams placed 9–16 in the qualification stroke-play formed flight B, to play similar knock-out match-play, with one foursome game and four single games, to decide their final positions.

The three teams placed 17–19 in the qualification stroke-play formed flight C, to meet each other, with one foursome game and four single games, to decide their final positions.

== Teams ==
19 nation teams contested the event. Each team consisted of six players.

Players in the teams

Country	Players
Austria	Leonie Bettel, Katharina Mühlbauer, Janika Rüttimann, Emma Spitz, Julia Unterweger, Lea Zeitler
Belgium	Clara Aveling, Diane Baillieux, Clarisse Louis, Celine Manche, Camille Richelle, Elodie Van Dievoet
Czech Republic	Kristina Frydlova, Sára Kousková, Marie Lunackova, Tereza Melecka, Jana Melichova, Katerina Vlasinova
Denmark	Cecilie Finne-Ipsen, Malene Krølbøll Hansen, Marie Lund Hansen, Puk Lyng Thomsen, Sofie Kibsgaard Nielsen, Karin Svanholm Fredgaard
England	Lianna Bailey, India Clyburn, Annabell Fuller, Alice Hewson, Lily May Humphreys, Sophie Lamb
Finland	Anna Backman, Daniella Barrett, Karina Kukkonen, Kiira Riihijärvi, Petra Salko, Emilia Tukianen
France	Shannon Aubert, Emma Broze, Mathilde Claisse, Agathe Laisné, Pauline Roussine-Bouchard, Chloe Salort
Germany	Miriam Emmert, Leonie Harm, Esther Henseleit, Aline Krauter, Polly Mack, Sophia Zeeb
Iceland	Andrea Bergsdottir, Berglind Bjornsdottir, Helga Kristin Einarsdottir, Ragnhildur Kristinsdóttir, Anna Solveig Snorradottir, Saga Traustadottir
Ireland	Paula Grant, Mairead Martin, Julie McCarthy, Olivia Mehaffey, Lauren Walsh, Annabel Wilson
Italy	Letzia Bagnoli, Virginia Elena Carta, Alessandra Fanali, Roberta Liti, Clara Manzalini, Angelica Moresco
Netherlands	Zhen Bontan, Pasqualle Coffa, Mayka Hoogeboom, Romy Meekers, Jennifer Sepers, Dewi Weber
Scotland	Gemma Batty, Eilidh Briggs, Chloe Goadby, Connie Jaffrey, Hannah McCook, Shannon McWilliam
Slovakia	Anika Bolcikova, Natalia Heckova, Laila Hrindova, Rebecca Hnidkova, Lea Klimentova, Sara Zrnikova
Slovenia	Pia Babnik, Inja Fric, Hana Mirnik, Vida Obersnel, Lara Jecnic, Neza Siftar
Spain	Celia Barquin Arozamena, Elena Hualde Zuniga, Paz Marfa Sans, Ainhoa Olarra, Ana Peláez Triviño, Marta Perez Sanmartin
Sweden	Linn Grant, Frida Kinhult, Sara Kjellker, Amanda Linnér, Maja Stark, Beatrice Wallin
Switzerland	Natalie Armbruester, Gioia Carpinelli, Vanessa Knecht, Azelia Meichtry, Elena Moosmann, Priscilla Schmid
Turkey	Damla Bilgic, Tugce Erden, Sena Ersoy, Serra Evrengil, Petek Peker, Selin Timur

== Winners ==
Eight times champions France lead the opening 36-hole qualifying competition, with a 29 under par score of 691, eleven strokes ahead of team Germany.

Individual leader in the 36-hole stroke-play competition was Frida Kinhult, Sweden, with a score of 14 under par 130, one stroke ahead of Olivia Mehaffey, Ireland.

Team Sweden won the championship, beating France 4–3 in the final and earned their eighth title. This came to be the first of three titles in a row for Sweden.

Team Denmark earned third place, beating Italy 4 1/2–2 1/2 in the bronze match.

== Results ==
Qualification round

Team standings

Place	Country	Score	To par
1	France	344-347=691	−29
2	Germany	353-349=702	−18
3	Sweden	348-355=703	−17
4	Denmark	354-353=707	−13
5	England	347-362=709	−11
6	Finland	360-350=710	−10
T7	Italy *	350-363=713	−7
T7	Ireland	354-359=713	−7
9	Spain	359-355=714	−6
10	Austria	359-359=718	−2
11	Scotland	359-362=721	+1
T12	Switzerland	362-365=727	+7
T12	Czech Republic	363-364=727	+7
14	Netherlands	366-364=730	+10
15	Belgium	361-373=734	+14
16	Slovakia	369-376=745	+25
17	Slovenia	369-376=745	+25
18	Iceland	386-368=754	+34
19	Turkey	379-378=757	+37

* Note: In the event of a tie the order was determined by the better total non-counting scores.

Individual leaders

Place	Player	Country	Score	To par
1	Frida Kinhult	Sweden	66-64=130	−14
2	Olivia Mehaffey	Ireland	65-66=131	−13
T3	Kiira Riihijärvi	Finland	66-68=134	−10
T3	Sophia Zeeb	Germany	69-65=134	−10
5	Emma Broze	France	71-64=135	−9
6	Ainhoa Olarra	Spain	69-68=137	−7
T7	India Clyburn	England	66-72=138	−6
T7	Agathe Laisné	France	68-70=138	−6
T7	Pauline Roussin-Bouchard	France	68-70=138	−6
T10	Virginia Elena Carta	Italy	69-70=139	−5
T10	Alice Hewson	England	70-69=139	−5
T10	Hannah McCook	Scotland	66-73=139	−5
T10	Dewi Weber	Netherlands	70-69=139	−5

Note: There was no official award for the lowest individual score.

Flight A

Bracket

Quarter finals
France	6
Ireland	1
Denmark	4.5
England	2.5
Italy	5
Germany	2
Sweden	4
Finland	3

Semi finals
France	4
Denmark	3
Sweden	5
Italy	2

Final
Sweden	5
France	2
Bronze match
Denmark	4.5
Italy	2.5

Elimination matches
England	3.5
Ireland	1.5
Germany	3
Finland	2

Match for 5th place
Germany	3.5
England	1.5
Match for 7th place
Finland	4
Ireland	1

Final games

Sweden	France
5	2
F. Kinhult / B. Wallin 1 hole	S. Aubert / P. Roussin Bouchard
L. Grant / A. Linner	E. Broze / A. Laisne 3 & 2
Sara Kjellker 3 & 1	Pauline Roussin Bouchard
Maja Stark	Chloe Salort 1 hole
Beatrice Wallin 4 & 3	Mathilde Claisse
Linn Grant 3 & 1	Emma Broze
Frida Kinhult 2 & 1	Agathe Laisne

Flight B

Bracket

Round 1
Spain	4.5
Slovakia	0.5
Czech Republic	3.5
Switzerland	1.5
Belgium	3.5
Austria	1.5
Netherlands	3
Scotland	2

Round 2
Spain	3.5
Czech Republic	1.5
Belgium	3
Netherlands	2

Match for 9th place
Spain	3.5
Belgium	1.5
Match for 11th place
Netherlands	3
Czech Republic	2

Elimination matches
Slovakia	3
Switzerland	2
Scotland	4
Austria	1

Match for 13th place
Scotland	4.5
Slovakia	0.5
Match for 15th place
Austria	4.5
Switzerland	0.5

Flight C

Team matches

0.5	Iceland	Turkey	0.5
2.5		2.5	

1	Slovenia	Iceland	0
5		0	

1	Slovenia	Turkey	0
3.5		1.5	

Team standings

Country	Place	W	T	L	Game points	Points
Slovenia	17	2	0	0	8.5–1.5	2
Turkey	18	0	1	1	4–6	0.5
Iceland	19	0	1	0	2.5–7.5	0.5

Final standings

Place	Country
1st place, gold medalist(s)	Sweden
2nd place, silver medalist(s)	France
3rd place, bronze medalist(s)	Denmark
4	Italy
5	Germany
6	England
7	Finland
8	Ireland
9	Spain
10	Belgium
11	Netherlands
12	Czech Republic
13	Scotland
14	Slovakia
15	Austria
16	Switzerland
17	Slovenia
18	Turkey
19	Iceland

== See also ==
- Espirito Santo Trophy – biennial world amateur team golf championship for women organized by the International Golf Federation.
- European Amateur Team Championship – European amateur team golf championship for men organised by the European Golf Association.
- European Ladies Amateur Championship – European amateur individual golf championship for women organised by the European Golf Association.
