= Ingrid Lindblad =

Swedish professional golfer (born 2000)

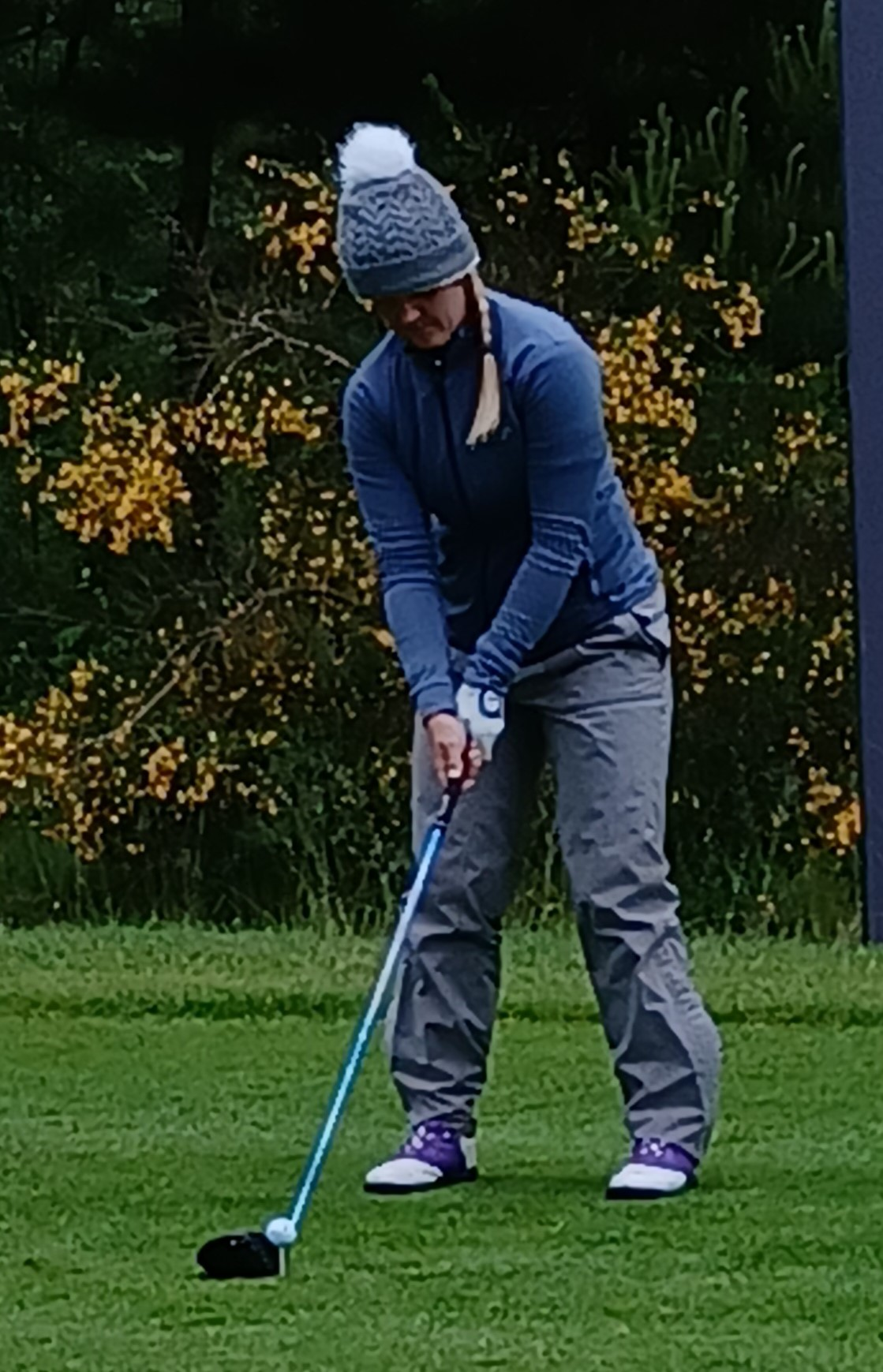
- Lindblad at the 2022 Scandinavian Mixed

Personal information
- Full name: Karin Ingrid Andrea Lindblad
- Nicknames: Iggy, Ingo
- Nationality: Sweden
- Born: 11 April 2000 (age 26) Halmstad, Sweden
- Height: 5 ft 6 in (168 cm)

Career
- Sport: Golf
- College: Louisiana State
- Turned professional: 2024
- Current tour: LPGA Tour (joined 2025)
- Former tour: Epson Tour (joined 2024)
- Professional wins: 4

Number of wins by tour
- LPGA Tour: 1
- Epson Tour: 1
- Other: 2

Best results in LPGA major championships
- Chevron Championship: T45: 2026
- Women's PGA C'ship: CUT: 2025, 2026
- U.S. Women's Open: T11: 2022
- Women's British Open: CUT: 2019, 2021, 2022, 2023, 2025
- Evian Championship: T26: 2024

Achievements and awards
- SEC Freshman of the Year: 2020
- SEC Player of the Year: 2020, 2022, 2024
- Mark H. McCormack Medal: 2023
- WGCA Player of the Year: 2024
- Annika Award: 2024
- Inkster Award: 2024
- Honda Sports Award: 2024

Karin Ingrid Andrea Lindblad (born 11 April 2000) is a Swedish professional golfer and LPGA Tour player. She had an exceptional amateur career and spent 53 weeks as World Amateur Golf Ranking number one, after winning the 2021 European Ladies Amateur, finishing runner-up at the 2022 Augusta National Women's Amateur, setting amateur scoring records at the 2022 U.S. Women's Open, winning the World Amateur Team Championship for the 2022 Espirito Santo Trophy, and collecting 15 college titles. In the third start of her LPGA Tour rookie season, she won the 2025 JM Eagle LA Championship.

== Amateur career ==
Lindblad grew up in Halmstad and joined the Swedish National Team in 2017. She represented her country at the European Girls' Team Championship, were Sweden won the bronze in 2018. She was then part of the Swedish teams that won the European Ladies' Team Championship in 2019 and 2020, teamed with Frida Kinhult, Sara Kjellker, Maja Stark, Linn Grant, and Beatrice Wallin. She was a member of the 2018 European Junior Ryder Cup team and was selected for the international team at the 2020 Arnold Palmer Cup and again at the 2021 Arnold Palmer Cup.

She also excelled individually. In 2017 she won the Irish Girls U18 Open Stroke Play Championship, and in 2018 the German Girls Open, ahead of Alessia Nobilio. She was runner-up at the 2018 Annika Invitational Europe and won the 2019 Annika Invitational USA. In 2019, Lindblad qualified for the 2019 Women's British Open, her first major championship, where she fell short of the cut.

Lindblad enrolled at Louisiana State University in 2019. In her freshman year, she had the best single season scoring average in LSU women's golf history at 70.33, beating Madelene Sagström's previous record of 71.48 from 2014 to 2015. She won twice individually in her pandemic-shortened freshman season, and became the first player in program history to earn Southeastern Conference Player of the Year and Freshman of the Year honors in the same season. Over her four seasons she captured 11 college titles, a school record, and 15 titles over her five seasons.

Over the summer in 2020, she played on the Nordic Golf Tour where she won the Golfhäftet Masters after a playoff with Beatrice Wallin. She then won the Skaftö Open, prevailing in a playoff against Wallin and Linn Grant. With the wins, Lindblad earned a runner-up position behind Grant in the Nordic Golf Tour 2020 Order of Merit.

The wins helped her rise to second spot in the World Amateur Golf Ranking, behind American Rose Zhang.

In the summer of 2021 she won the European Ladies Amateur Championship in Italy, 3 strokes ahead of Alexandra Försterling. In 2022, Lindblad had a spectacular spring as a junior at LSU, winning four out of the first five tournaments of the year. She won the SEC Women's Individual Championship by sinking a 38-foot putt for eagle on the final hole. Lindblad posted a 2-0-1 record in team match play to help LSU win its first team league title in 30 years. Reaching nine career LSU wins, she topped Jenny Lidback's previous record of seven set in the 1985–86 season.

Lindblad appeared in four installments of the Augusta National Women's Amateur, finishing third in 2021 and 2024 and as runner-up in 2022, one stroke behind winner Anna Davis.

In the 2022 U.S. Women's Open at the Pine Needles Lodge and Golf Club, Lindblad finished leading amateur at tied 11th. Her first round of 6 under par 65, playing together with Annika Sörenstam and with Sophie Gustafson on the bag, was the lowest round ever by an amateur in the U.S. Women's Open and the second lowest round by a European player in the history of the championship. She also beat the amateur scoring records over 36 and 54 holes and tied the 72-hole amateur record in the tournament. Her putting performance was especially noticed, as she holed 66 of 69 putts inside 10 feet and every one of 50 putts from 5 feet or less during the tournament.

She accepted an invitation to the 2022 Volvo Car Scandinavian Mixed, hosted jointly by the European Tour and Ladies European Tour and held at Halmstad Golf Club, a former Solheim Cup venue in her home town. Men and women played from different tees and Lindblad finished tied 7th among the women and tied 33rd overall, propelling her into the top 250 in the Women's World Golf Rankings.

In August 2022, Lindblad teamed up with Meja Örtengren and Louise Rydqvist to win the World Amateur Team Championship for the Espirito Santo Trophy, beating the U.S. team with Rachel Heck, Rachel Kuehn and Rose Zhang through better tie-breaking non-counting score.

Lindblad rose to number 1 in the World Amateur Golf Ranking in June 2023, after rival Rose Zhang turned professional. Her compatriot, Ludvig Åberg, simultaneously occupied the men's number 1 spot. She won the Mark H. McCormack Medal as the top-ranked golfer at the conclusion of the major tournaments of 2023. This gained her entry into the 2024 U.S. Women's Open and Women's British Open. She ended her final amateur season with being named WGCA Player of the Year and receiving the Annika Award, the Inkster Award and the Honda Sports Award.

== Professional career ==
Lindblad turned professional in June 2024 and made her professional debut at the FireKeepers Casino Hotel Championship on the Epson Tour, having secured status at Q-School the previous fall. She was runner-up at the weather-shortened Island Resort Championship and at the Guardian Championship, before securing her maiden victory at the Tuscaloosa Toyota Classic in her 7th start. Despite joining mid-season and only making 9 starts, she finished 6th on the Race for the Card, to gain a fully exempt card on the LPGA Tour for the 2025 season.

In the third start of her LPGA Tour rookie season, Lindblad shot a nine-under 63 on her way to win the JM Eagle LA Championship at El Caballero Country Club for her first LPGA victory.

== Amateur wins ==
- 2015 Junior Masters Invitational, Jönköping Junior Open by FJ
- 2017 Irish Girls U18 Open Stroke Play Championship, Stenson Sunesson Junior Challenge, Swedish Junior Classics, Bokskogen Junior Open
- 2018 German Girls Open, Jönköping Junior Open
- 2019 Annika Invitational USA, Teen Tour Elite #1, Magnolia Invitational
- 2020 Florida State Match Up
- 2021 Liz Murphey Collegiate Classic, LSU Tiger Golf Classic, European Ladies Amateur Championship, Jackson T. Stephens Cup
- 2022 Moon Golf Invitational, Clover Cup, Clemson Invitational, SEC Women's Golf Championship, Battle at the Beach
- 2023 Clemson Invitational, Cougar Classic, Illini Women's Invitational at Medinah
- 2024 Clemson Invitational, NCAA DI Bryan Regional

== Professional wins (4) ==
=== LPGA Tour (1) ===
No.	Date	Tournament	Winning score	To par	Margin of victory	Runner-up
1	20 Apr 2025	JM Eagle LA Championship	68-63-68-68=267	−21	1 stroke	(Japan) Akie Iwai

=== Epson Tour (1) ===
No.	Date	Tournament	Winning score	To par	Margin of victory	Runner-up
1	15 Sep 2024	Tuscaloosa Toyota Classic	67-66-67=200	−16	2 strokes	(Slovenia) Ana Belac

=== Nordic Golf Tour (2) ===
No.	Date	Tournament	Winning score	To par	Margin of victory	Runner(s)-up	Ref
1	7 Aug 2020	Golfhäftet Masters (as an amateur)	70-65-65=200	−16	Playoff	(Sweden) Beatrice Wallin	
2	29 Aug 2020	Didriksons Skaftö Open (as an amateur)	68-65-65=198	−9	Playoff	(Sweden) Linn Grant (Sweden) Beatrice Wallin	

== Results in LPGA majors ==
Results not in chronological order.

Tournament	2019	2020	2021	2022	2023	2024	2025	2026
Chevron Championship							T52	T45
U.S. Women's Open		T30		T11 LA		CUT	35	T60
Women's PGA Championship							CUT	CUT
The Evian Championship		NT				T26	CUT	CUT
Women's British Open	CUT		CUT	CUT	CUT		CUT	

Did not play

LA = low amateur
CUT = missed the half-way cut
NT = no tournament
T = tied

=== Summary ===
Tournament	Wins	2nd	3rd	Top-5	Top-10	Top-25	Events	Cuts made
Chevron Championship	0	0	0	0	0	0	2	2
U.S. Women's Open	0	0	0	0	0	1	5	4
Women's PGA Championship	0	0	0	0	0	0	2	0
The Evian Championship	0	0	0	0	0	0	3	1
Women's British Open	0	0	0	0	0	0	5	0
Totals	0	0	0	0	0	1	17	7

- Most consecutive cuts made – 3 (2024 Evian – 2025 U.S. Women's Open)

== Team appearances ==
Amateur

- Junior Ryder Cup (representing Europe): 2018
- Junior Golf World Cup (representing Sweden): 2018
- European Girls' Team Championship (representing Sweden): 2018
- European Ladies' Team Championship (representing Sweden): 2019 (winners), 2020 (winners), 2021, 2022, 2023
- Arnold Palmer Cup (representing the International Team): 2020 (winners), 2021
- Espirito Santo Trophy (representing Sweden): 2022 (winners), 2023

Professional

- International Crown (representing Sweden): 2025
