= Kalmar Ladies Open =

Swedish golf tournament

Tournament information
- Location: Kalmar County, Sweden
- Established: 2002
- Course: Ekerum Golf Resort
- Par: 72
- Tour: Swedish Golf Tour
- Format: 54-hole stroke play
- Prize fund: SEK 100,000
- Final year: 2019

Tournament record score
- Aggregate: 207 Amanda Linnér
- To par: −9 as above

Final champion
- (Sweden) Amanda Linnér (a)

The Kalmar Ladies Open was a women's professional golf tournament on the Swedish Golf Tour, played between 2002 and 2019. It was first held in Kalmar and later moved to the nearby island of Öland in Kalmar County, Sweden.

The inaugural tournament was won in a playoff by Australian college player Susie Mathews, who would go on to win the 2004 NCAA Championship with UCLA. Kalmar native Åsa Gottmo lost the playoff in 2002, but won the 2003 tournament by a convincing nine strokes.

== Winners ==
Year	Venue	Winner	Score	Margin of victory	Runner(s)-up	Prize fund (SEK)	Ref
Lindbytvätten Masters
2019	Ekerum	(Sweden) Amanda Linnér (a)	207 (−9)	3 strokes	(Sweden) Amanda Lindahl	100,000	
2008–2018: No tournament
Ekerum Ladies Masters
2007	Ekerum	(Norway) Marianne Skarpnord	212 (−4)	1 stroke	(Sweden) Jacqueline Hedwall (a) (Sweden) Frida Parkhagen (a)	300,000	
2006	Ekerum	(Sweden) Cecilia Ekelundh	281 (−7)	1 stroke	(Sweden) Sanna Johansson (Sweden) Hanna-Sofia Leijon	300,000	
2004–2005: No tournament
FöreningsSparbanken Kalmar Ladies Open
2003	Kalmar	(Sweden) Åsa Gottmo	209 (−7)	9 strokes	(Sweden) Eva Bjärvall (Finland) Pia Koivuranta (Finland) Jenni Kuosa	150,000	
Kalmar Ladies Open
2002	Kalmar	(Australia) Susie Mathews (a)	213 (−3)	Playoff	(Sweden) Åsa Gottmo (Sweden) Helena Svensson (a)	200,000	
