= Sophie Hausmann =

German professional golfer

Personal information
- Nationality: Germany
- Born: 2 June 1997 (age 29) Nottuln, Germany

Career
- Sport: Golf
- College: University of Idaho
- Turned professional: 2019
- Current tours: Ladies European Tour (joined 2020); Epson Tour (joined 2020)
- Professional wins: 1

Number of wins by tour
- Epson Tour: 1

Best results in LPGA major championships
- Chevron Championship: DNP
- Women's PGA C'ship: DNP
- U.S. Women's Open: T45: 2025
- Women's British Open: DNP
- Evian Championship: DNP

Achievements and awards
- Big Sky Women's Golfer of the Year: 2018, 2019

Sophie Hausmann (born 2 June 1997) is a German professional golfer and member of the Epson Tour and Ladies European Tour.

== Amateur career ==
Hausmann started playing golf at the age of 4. She competed for her North Rhine-Westphalia club team for five years where she was third in the state girls' championship in 2011 and 2012, and both state ladies and girls champion in 2013. In 2016, she won the German International Amateur.

Hausmann competed for the German National team between 2015 and 2019. She appeared at the Espirito Santo Trophy twice, in 2016 in Mexico with Antonia Eberhard and Esther Henseleit, and in 2018 in Ireland with Leonie Harm and Esther Henseleit, where they finished 5th.

She appeared at the European Ladies' Team Championship three times, finishing 4th in 2016 and 5th in 2017, before securing a bronze medal at the 2019 event in Italy.

Hausmann accepted an athletic scholarship to the University of Idaho and played golf with the Idaho Vandals women's golf team between 2015 and 2019. She was named Big Sky Conference Player of the Year her junior and senior year, and led her team to two conference championships. She was first team all-conference selection four-times and won back-to-back titles at the Long Beach Golf Rush in 2017 and 2018. She played Regionals three times and graduated with a degree in economics.

Hausmann appeared at the 2018 U.S. Women's Open, her first career LPGA Tour event, after finishing second at the Seattle qualifier, and appeared at the inaugural Augusta National Women's Amateur in 2019.

== Professional career ==
Hausmann turned professional at the end of 2019, having earned status on both the Symetra Tour and the Ladies European Tour.

She won her first professional tournament at the 2021 IOA Championship in California.

In 2022, she finished solo 4th at the Magical Kenya Ladies Open, five strokes behind the winner, her compatriot Esther Henseleit.

Hausmann was runner-up at the 2026 Ladies Italian Open at Monza, three strokes behind Casandra Alexander, following a final round 64.

== Amateur wins ==
- 2016 German International Amateur, Big Sky Championship
- 2017 The Gold Rush
- 2018 The Gold Rush, Big Sky Championship

== Professional wins (1) ==
=== Symetra Tour wins (1) ===
No.	Date	Tournament	Winning score	To par	Margin of victory	Runner(s)-up
1	28 Mar 2021	IOA Championship	68-68-70=206	−10	3 strokes	(Canada) Maude-Aimée LeBlanc (United States) Sophia Schubert

== Team appearances ==
Amateur

- Espirito Santo Trophy (representing Germany): 2016, 2018
- European Ladies' Team Championship (representing Germany): 2016, 2017, 2019
