= Louise Rydqvist =

Swedish professional golfer (born 2001)

Personal information
- Nationality: Sweden
- Born: 18 July 2001 (age 25) Värnamo, Sweden

Career
- Sport: Golf
- College: University of South Carolina
- Turned professional: 2025
- Current tour: Ladies European Tour (joined 2026)
- Former tour: LET Access Series (joined 2025)
- Professional wins: 1

Best results in LPGA major championships
- Chevron Championship: DNP
- Women's PGA C'ship: DNP
- U.S. Women's Open: DNP
- Women's British Open: T60: 2024
- Evian Championship: DNP

Achievements and awards
- Swedish Golf Tour Order of Merit winner: 2020
- Edith Cummings Munson Award: 2024
- PGA of Sweden Future Fund Award: 2025
- Michael Carter Memorial Award: 2025

Louise Rydqvist (born 18 July 2001) is a Swedish professional golfer and Ladies European Tour player. In 2022, she was runner-up at The Women's Amateur Championship and won the Espirito Santo Trophy. In 2024, she won the European Ladies Amateur and made the cut at the Women's British Open.

== Amateur career ==
Rydqvist joined the national team in 2017 and competed at the European Girls' Team Championship twice, winning the bronze on home soil in 2018. In 2019, she played in the Junior Golf World Cup in Japan and the World Junior Girls Championship in Canada. She came close to winning her first international title at the 2018 Irish Girls U18 Open Stroke Play Championship at Roganstown Golf & Country Club, where she was runner-up one shot behind her compatriot Kajsa Arwefjäll. In 2019 she finished tied 3rd at the same event.

In 2020, Rydqvist played on the Swedish Golf Tour where she shared the Order of Merit title with Line Toft Hansen, after winning the Johannesberg Ladies Open and finishing runner-up at the Allerum Open a stroke behind Sara Kjellker.

In 2022, Rydqvist was runner-up at The Women's Amateur Championship, beaten 4 and 3 by Jess Baker in the final, and played on the winning Swedish team in the Espirito Santo Trophy at Le Golf National in France together with Ingrid Lindblad and Meja Örtengren.

Rydqvist won the 2024 European Ladies Amateur three strokes ahead of Andrea Revuelta of Spain. The win earned her a spot at the 2024 Women's British Open at the Old Course at St Andrews, where she shot a second-round 67 to sit in tied 5th place and make the cut. She was the only female amateur to make the cut at the 2024 Scandinavian Mixed.

== College career ==
Rydqvist graduated from the riksidrottsgymnasium in golf at Filbornaskolan in Helsingborg and accepted an athletic scholarship to the University of South Carolina, where she played with the South Carolina Gamecocks women's golf team between 2021 and 2025.

Rydqvist was named All-American all four years. As a junior, she was runner-up at both the SEC Championship and the NCAA Auburn Regional, and lead South Carolina with a 71.14 scoring average, their third-lowest season score on record. As a sophomore, she was named a First Team WGCA All-American, and received the Edith Cummings Munson Award.

After winning the 2023 Annika Intercollegiate, Rydqvist received a sponsor's invite to The Annika, her first LPGA Tour event, where she made the cut and finished tied 46th.

Her final college event was the 2025 Arnold Palmer Cup, where her team defeated the United States 35-25 and she was presented with the Michael Carter Memorial Award.

== Professional career ==
Rydqvist turned professional after graduating in 2025 and made her pro debut at the Swedish PGA Championship on the LET Access Series.

She earned conditional status for the 2026 Ladies European Tour at Q-School where she finished tied 36th, and made her debut at the Joburg Ladies Open.

== Amateur wins ==
- 2016 Puma/Cobra Junior Masters Invitational
- 2017 Delsjö Junior Open
- 2019 PGA Junior Open by Titleist
- 2023 Annika Intercollegiate
- 2024 European Ladies Amateur Championship
- 2025 Darius Rucker Intercollegiate

== Professional wins (1) ==
=== Swedish Golf Tour (1) ===
No.	Date	Tournament	Winning score	To par	Margin of victory	Runners-up
1	9 Sep 2020	Johannesberg Ladies Open^ (as an amateur)	71-70=141	−3	2 strokes	(Sweden) Kajsa Arwefjäll (a) (Sweden) Linda Lundqvist (Sweden) Anna Magnusson

^Shortened to 36 holes due to adverse weather conditions

== Results in LPGA majors ==
Tournament	2024
Chevron Championship	
U.S. Women's Open	
Women's PGA Championship	
The Evian Championship	
Women's British Open	T60

Did not play

T = tied

== Team appearances ==
Amateur

- European Girls' Team Championship (representing Sweden): 2018, 2019
- Junior Golf World Cup (representing Sweden): 2019
- World Junior Girls Championship (representing Sweden): 2019
- European Ladies' Team Championship (representing Sweden): 2022, 2023, 2024
- Espirito Santo Trophy (representing Sweden): 2022 (winners)
- Arnold Palmer Cup (representing International team): 2024, 2025 (winners)
- Patsy Hankins Trophy (representing Europe): 2025
