= 2020 U.S. Women's Open =

Tournament information
- Dates: December 10–14, 2020
- Location: Houston, Texas; 29.983°N 95.531°W
- Courses: Champions Golf Club; Cypress Creek and Jackrabbit Courses
- Organized by: USGA
- Tour: LPGA Tour

Statistics
- Par: 71
- Length: 7,301 yards (6,676 m) (Cypress Creek)7,021 yards (6,420 m) (Jackrabbit)
- Field: 156 players, 66 after cut
- Cut: 145 (+3)
- Prize fund: $5.5 million
- Winner's share: $1,000,000

Champion
- (South Korea) Kim A-lim
- 281 (−3)
- Location in the United States Location in Texas

The 2020 U.S. Women's Open was the 75th U.S. Women's Open, played December 10–14 at Champions Golf Club in Houston, Texas, having been postponed from its original date of June 4–7, 2020, on April 3, 2020 as a result of the COVID-19 pandemic. It was played on both the Cypress Creek and Jackrabbit courses.

The U.S. Women's Open is the oldest of the five major championships and is the fourth of the 2020 season. It has the largest purse in women's golf at $5.5 million.

Kim A-lim won the tournament by birdieing the last three holes.

== Qualifying and field ==
The championship is open to any female professional or amateur golfer with a USGA or World Handicap System index not exceeding 2.4. Players may usually qualify by competing in one of 24 36-hole qualifying tournaments held across the United States and at international sites in China, England, Japan, and South Korea. Many players are exempt from qualifying because of past performances in professional or amateur tournaments around the world.

Due to the COVID-19 pandemic, the usual qualifying tournaments were canceled and the championship became "all-exempt" with amended criteria.

=== Exemption categories ===
Many players are exempt in multiple categories. Players are listed only once, in the first category in which they became exempt, with additional categories in parentheses () next to their names. Golfers qualifying in Category 16 who qualified in other categories are denoted by the tour they qualified.

1. Winners of the U.S. Women's Open for the last ten years (2010–2019)

Lee Jeong-eun (2,9,15), Ariya Jutanugarn (8,9,15), Park Sung-hyun (6,9,10,15), Brittany Lang, Chun In-gee (7,15), Michelle Wie, Inbee Park (8,9,10,15), Choi Na-yeon, Ryu So-yeon (2,5,15), Paula Creamer

2. Ten lowest scorers and anyone tying for 10th place from the 2019 U.S. Women's Open

Angel Yin (15), Lexi Thompson (9,10,15), Gerina Piller, Mamiko Higa (15), Jaye Marie Green, Céline Boutier (9,15), Yu Liu (9,15), Ally McDonald (15), Jessica Korda (9,15)

3. Winner of the 2019 U.S. Women's Amateur (Note: May turn professional at any time following the Amateur until the start of the Open.)

Gabriela Ruffels

4. Winner of the 2019 U.S. Girls' Junior and U.S. Women's Mid-Amateur, and finalist from the 2019 U.S. Women's Amateur (Note: Must remain an amateur through to completion of the championship.)

Lei Ye, Ina Kim-Schaad, ~~Albane Valenzuela~~ (Note: Albane Valenzuela forfeited her exemption as runner-up in the 2019 U.S. Women's Amateur when she turned professional in November 2019.)

5. Winners of the ANA Inspiration for the last five years (2016–2020)

Ko Jin-young (7,9,10,15), Pernilla Lindberg, Lydia Ko (7,15)

6. Winners of the Women's PGA Championship for the last five years (2015–2019)

Hannah Green (9,10,15), Danielle Kang (9,10,15), Brooke Henderson (9,10,15)

7. Winners of the Evian Championship for the last five years (2015–2019)

Angela Stanford, Anna Nordqvist

8. Winners of the Women's British Open for the last five years (2015–2019)

Hinako Shibuno (10,16), Georgia Hall (15), In-Kyung Kim (15)

9. Top 30 points leaders from the 2019 LPGA Race to the CME Globe final points standings

Minjee Lee (15), Nelly Korda (10,15), Kim Sei-young (10,15), Kim Hyo-joo (15), M. J. Hur (10,15), Amy Yang (15), Nasa Hataoka (15), Carlota Ciganda (15), Brittany Altomare (15), Shanshan Feng (10,15), Ji Eun-hee (15), Azahara Muñoz (15), Moriya Jutanugarn (15), Bronte Law (15), Lizette Salas (15), Caroline Masson (15), Su-Hyun Oh (15), Gaby López (10,15)

10. Winners of LPGA co-sponsored events, whose victories are considered official, from the conclusion of the 2019 U.S. Women's Open to June 1, the originally scheduled start of the 2020 U.S. Women's Open

Cheyenne Knight, Jang Ha-na (16), Ai Suzuki (15,16), Madelene Sagström (15), Park Hee-young

11. Winner of the 2019 British Ladies Amateur

Emily Toy

12. Winner of the 2019 Mark H. McCormack Medal (Women's World Amateur Golf Ranking)

~~Andrea Lee~~ (Note: Andrea Lee forfeited her exemption as winner of the Mark H. McCormack Medal when she turned professional in November 2019 but subsequently earned entry through category 13.)

13. Top 10 money leaders from the 2020 official LPGA money list, not otherwise exempt, through the close of entries on November 11, 2020

Cydney Clanton, Perrine Delacour, Jodi Ewart Shadoff, Mina Harigae, Andrea Lee, Stacy Lewis, Lin Xiyu, Thidapa Suwannapura, Kelly Tan, Lindsey Weaver

14. Top 5 money leaders from the 2020 official Symetra Tour money list through the close of entries on November 11, 2020

Ana Belac, Fátima Fernández Cano, Janie Jackson, Kim Kaufman, Frida Kinhult

15. Top 75 points leaders and ties from the Rolex Rankings on March 16, 2020

Lim Hee-jeong (16), Charley Hull, Jiyai Shin (16), Choi Hye-jin (16), Marina Alex, Lee Da-yeon (16), Cho A-yean (16), Bae Seon-woo (16), Megan Khang, Kristen Gillman, Lee Min-young (16), Lee Mi-hyang, Jennifer Kupcho, Amy Olson, Park Min-ji, Lee So-mi, Morgan Pressel, Ahn Sun-ju, Mone Inami, Nanna Koerstz Madsen, Yui Kawamoto, Momoko Ueda, Cho Jeong-min, Lee So-young, Annie Park, Minami Katsu, Nicole Broch Larsen, Austin Ernst, Kim A-lim, Kim Ji-yeong, Park Chae-yoon, Chella Choi, Jing Yan

16. Top 5 money leaders from the 2019 Japan LPGA Tour, Korea LPGA Tour and Ladies European Tour

Esther Henseleit (LET), Marianne Skarpnord (LET), Christine Wolf (LET), Nuria Iturrioz (LET), Meghan MacLaren (LET)

17. Top 3 money leaders from the 2019 China LPGA Tour

- Zhang Weiwei, Liu Yan and Du Mohan did not play

18. The top 2 players, not otherwise exempt, in the top 10 and ties of the 2020 Walmart NW Arkansas Championship, Cambia Portland Classic, ShopRite LPGA Classic, and the top 3 players, not otherwise exempt, in the top 10 and ties of the KPMG Women's PGA Championship

Ashleigh Buhai, Katherine Kirk, Yealimi Noh, Bianca Pagdanganan, Mel Reid, Jenny Shin, Jennifer Song, Lauren Stephenson

19. Top 20 points leaders, not otherwise exempt, within the top 100 from the Women's World Amateur Golf Ranking on November 4, 2020

Rose Zhang, Ingrid Lindblad, Pauline Roussin-Bouchard, Linn Grant, Emilia Migliaccio, Alessia Nobilio, An Ho-yu, Benedetta Moresco, Agathe Laisné, Maja Stark, Lucie Malchirand, Beatrice Wallin, Olivia Mehaffey, Lily May Humphreys, Kaitlyn Papp, Emma Spitz, Caterina Don, Amelia Garvey, Auston Kim, Allisen Corpuz

20. Remaining spots filled in order using the Rolex Rankings as of November 9, 2020

An Na-rin, Lala Anai, Pajaree Anannarukarn, Saki Asai, Maria Fassi, Ayaka Furue, Erika Hara, Caroline Hedwall, Jeon Mi-jeong, Asuka Kashiwabara, Cristie Kerr, Christina Kim, Sakura Koiwai, Lee Jeong-eun, Lee Seung-yeon, Teresa Lu, Kana Mikashima, Yuna Nishimura, Eri Okayama, Ryann O'Toole, Emily Kristine Pedersen, Pornanong Phatlum, Sophia Popov, Ryu Hae-ran, Yuka Saso, Sarah Schmelzel, Alena Sharp, Linnea Ström, Sung Yu-jin, Sayaka Takahashi, Patty Tavatanakit, Maria Fernanda Torres, Anne van Dam

21. Special exemptions selected by the USGA

Brittany Lincicome, (Note: Maternity extension.) Sarah Jane Smith

== Round summaries ==
=== First round ===
Thursday, December 10, 2020

Place	Player	Course	Score	To par
1	(United States) Amy Olson	CC	67	−4
T2	(South Korea) Kim A-lim	JR	68	−3
T2	(Thailand) Moriya Jutanugarn	JR	68	−3
T2	(Japan) Hinako Shibuno	CC	68	−3
T5	(Sweden) Linn Grant (a)	CC	69	−2
T5	(England) Charley Hull	JR	69	−2
T5	(United States) Gerina Piller	JR	69	−2
T5	(Germany) Sophia Popov	CC	69	−2
T5	(Philippines) Yuka Saso	CC	69	−2
T5	(Sweden) Linnea Ström	JR	69	−2
T5	(Thailand) Patty Tavatanakit	JR	69	−2

JR denotes player played her round on the Jackrabbit course.
CC denotes player played her round on the Cypress Creek course.

=== Second round ===
Friday, December 11, 2020

Place	Player	Course	Score	To par
1	(Japan) Hinako Shibuno	JR	68-67=135	−7
2	(Sweden) Linn Grant (a)	JR	69-69=138	−4
T3	(United States) Kaitlyn Papp (a)	CC	71-68=139	−3
T3	(United States) Megan Khang	CC	70-69=139	−3
T3	(United States) Amy Olson	JR	67-72=139	−3
T6	(South Africa) Ashleigh Buhai	JR	71-69=140	−2
T6	(Thailand) Ariya Jutanugarn	CC	70-70=140	−2
T6	(Thailand) Moriya Jutanugarn	CC	68-72=140	−2
T6	(United States) Cristie Kerr	CC	71-69=140	−2
T6	(United States) Stacy Lewis	JR	72-68=140	−2
T6	(Philippines) Yuka Saso	JR	69-71=140	−2
T6	(United States) Sarah Schmelzel	JR	71-69=140	−2
T6	(United States) Lindsey Weaver	CC	70-70=140	−2

JR denotes player played her round on the Jackrabbit course.
CC denotes player played her round on the Cypress Creek course.

=== Third round ===
Saturday, December 12, 2020

Note: The third and fourth rounds were played on the Cypress Creek course.

Place	Player	Score	To par
1	(Japan) Hinako Shibuno	68-67-74=209	−4
2	(United States) Amy Olson	67-72-71=210	−3
T3	(Thailand) Moriya Jutanugarn	68-72-72=212	−1
T3	(South Korea) Kim Ji-yeong	68-72-72=212	−1
T5	(United States) Megan Khang	70-69-74=213	E
T5	(New Zealand) Lydia Ko	71-71-72=213	E
T5	(United States) Yealimi Noh	72-69-72=213	E
T5	(United States) Kaitlyn Papp (a)	71-68-74=213	E
T9	(Thailand) Ariya Jutanugarn	70-70-74=214	+1
T9	(United States) Cristie Kerr	71-69-74=214	+1
T9	(South Korea) Kim Sei-young	72-69-73=214	+1
T9	(South Korea) Kim A-lim	68-74-72=214	+1
T9	(South Korea) Ko Jin-young	72-72-70=214	+1
T9	(South Korea) Ryu Hae-ran	73-70-71=214	+1

=== Final round ===
Sunday, December 13 and Monday, December 14, 2020

Place	Player	Score	To par	Money ($)
1	(South Korea) Kim A-lim	68-74-72-67=281	−3	1,000,000
T2	(South Korea) Ko Jin-young	72-72-70-68=282	−2	487,286
T2	(United States) Amy Olson	67-72-71-72=282	−2	487,286
4	(Japan) Hinako Shibuno	68-67-74-74=283	−1	266,779
5	(United States) Megan Khang	70-69-74-72=285	+1	222,201
T6	(Thailand) Moriya Jutanugarn	68-72-72-74=286	+2	177,909
T6	(South Korea) Lee Jeong-eun	73-69-73-71=286	+2	177,909
T6	(South Korea) Inbee Park	71-72-75-68=286	+2	177,909
T9	(Thailand) Ariya Jutanugarn	70-70-74-73=287	+3	143,976
T9	(United States) Kaitlyn Papp (a)	71-68-74-74=287	+3	0
