= 2019 European Ladies' Team Championship =

Golf competition

Tournament information
- Dates: 9–13 July 2019
- Location: Pula, Sardinia, Italy; 39°00′10″N 8°57′50″E
- Course: Golf Club Is Molas
- Organized by: European Golf Association
- Format: 36 holes stroke play Knock-out match-play

Statistics
- Par: 72
- Length: 6,060 yards (5,540 m)
- Field: 20 teams 120 players

Champion
- Sweden; Linn Grant, Frida Kinhult, Sara Kjellker, Ingrid Lindblad, Maja Stark, Beatrice Wallin
- Qualification round: 705 (−15); Final match 5–2
- Location in Europe Location in Italy Location in Sardinia

The 2019 European Ladies' Team Championship took place 9–13 July at Golf Club Is Molas, in Pula, Italy. It was the 36th women's golf amateur European Ladies' Team Championship.

== Venue ==
The hosting course, located in Pula municipality in the Metropolitan City of Cagliari in the Italian region of Sardinia, located about 25 kilometres (16 miles) southwest of Cagliari, was inaugurated in 1975 and laid out by the Cotton, Pennink & Partners architectural studio to a design by Piero Mancinelli. Four Italian Open tournaments on the European Tour were previously held on the course.

The championship course was set up with par 72.

== Format ==
All participating teams played two qualification rounds of stroke-play with six players, counted the five best scores for each team.

The eight best teams formed flight A, in knock-out match-play over the next three days. The teams were seeded based on their positions after the stroke-play. The first placed team was drawn to play the quarter-final against the eight placed team, the second against the seventh, the third against the sixth and the fourth against the fifth. In each match between two nation teams, two 18-hole foursome games and five 18-hole single games were played. Teams were allowed to switch players during the team matches, selecting other players in to the afternoon single games after the morning foursome games. Teams knocked out after the quarter-finals played one foursome game and four single games in each of their remaining matches. Games all square after 18 holes were declared halved, if the team match was already decided.

The eight teams placed 9–16 in the qualification stroke-play formed flight B, to play similar knock-out match-play, with one foursome game and four single games, to decide their final positions.

The four teams placed 17–20 in the qualification stroke-play formed flight C, to meet each other, with one foursome game and four single games, to decide their final positions.

== Teams ==
20 nation teams contested the event. Each team consisted of six players.

Players in the teams

Country	Players
Austria	Leonie Bettel, Chantal Dueringer, Isabella Holpfer, Janika Reitimann, Katharina Muehlbauer, Emma Spitz
Belgium	Margaux Appart, Charlotte De Corte, Clemence Gendebien, Clarisse Louis, Celine Manche, Margaux Vanmol
Czech Republic	Kristina Frydlova, Sára Kousková, Frantiska Lunackova, Marie Lunackova, Tereza Melecka, Jana Melichova
Denmark	Cecilie B. S. Nielsen, Cecilie Finne-Ipsen, Marie Lund Hansen, Puk Lyng Thomsen, Sofie Kibsgaard Nielsen, Karin Svanholm Fredgaard
England	Lianna Bailey, Annabell Fuller, Alice Hewson, Lily May Humphreys, Hannah Screen, Emily Toy
Finland	Anna Backman, Daniella Barrett, Kiira Riihijärvi, Elina Saksa, Petra Salko, Emilia Tukiainen
France	Elodie Chapelet, Yvie Chauche Prat, Gala Dumez, Candice Mahe, Pauline Roussin-Bouchard, Chloe Salort
Germany	Leonie Harm, Sophie Hausmann, Aline Krauter, Polly Mack, Sarina Schmidt, Sophia Zeeb
Iceland	Andrea Bergsdottir, Hulda Clara, Helga Kristin Einarsdottir, Heidrun Anna Hlynsdottir, Ragnhildur Kristinsdóttir, Saga Traustadottir
Ireland	Shannon Burke, Paula Grant, Julie McCarthy, Jessica Ross, Lauren Walsh, Annabel Wilson
Italy	Letzia Bagnoli, Alessandra Fanali, Clara Manzalini, Angelica Moresco, Alessia Nobilio, Anna Zanusso
Netherlands	Rosanne Boere, Zhen Bontan, Romy Meekers, Charlotte Roodenburg, Noa Van Beek, Daphne Van Son
Russia	Sofia Anokhina, Alexandra Chekalina, Polina Marina, Kristina Ponomareva, Ekaterina Malakhova, Nataliya Guseva
Scotland	Eilidh Briggs, Penny Brown, Hannah Darling, Chloe Goadby, Hazel MacGarvie, Shannon McWilliam
Slovakia	Laila Hrindova, Anika Bolcikova, Katarina Drocarova, Michaela Vávrová, Natalia Heckova, Lea Klimentova
Slovenia	Pia Babnik, Inja Fric, Hana Mirnik, Vida Obersnel, Lara Jecnic, Tijana Jovecevic Kovacic
Spain	Marta Garcia Llorca, Maria Herraez Galvez, Elena Hualde, Ana Peláez, Marta Perez Sanmartin, Teresa Toscano Borrero
Sweden	Linn Grant, Frida Kinhult, Sara Kjellker, Ingrid Lindblad, Maja Stark, Beatrice Wallin
Switzerland	Tiffany Arafi, Nathalie Armbruester, Gioia Carpinelli, Vanessa Knecht, Chiara Tamburlini, Klara Wildhaber
Turkey	Irem Demir, Serra Evrengil, Mina Gencoguz, Gulten Gozuyanik, Petek Peker, Celine Ustgard

== Winners ==
Team Italy lead the opening 36-hole qualifying competition, with a 19 under par score of 701, four strokes ahead of defending champions Sweden.

Individual leader in the 36-hole stroke-play competition was 15 years old Pia Babnik, Slovenia, with a score of 9 under par 135, one stroke ahead of last years individual winner, Frida Kinhult, Sweden.

Team Sweden won the championship, beating Spain 5–2 in the final and earned their ninth title. This came to be the second of three titles in a row for Sweden.

Team Italy earned third place, beating Germany 5–2 in the bronze match.

== Results ==
Qualification round

Team standings

Place	Country	Score	To par
1	Italy	343-358=701	−19
2	Sweden	351-354=705	−15
3	Germany	353-363=716	−4
4	Scotland	348-369=717	−3
5	Spain	353-368=721	+1
6	Denmark	356-369=725	+5
7	England	355-371=726	+6
8	Ireland	360-369=729	+9
T9	Slovenia *	362-369=731	+11
T9	France	363-368=731	+11
T11	Finland *	363-369=732	+12
T11	Switzerland	361-371=732	+12
13	Czech Republic	357-376=733	+13
14	Austria	370-369=739	+19
15	Slovakia	362-378=740	+20
16	Russia	360-387=747	+27
17	Belgium	365-384=749	+29
18	Netherlands	370-387=757	+37
19	Iceland	375-387=762	+42
20	Turkey	409-405=814	+94

* Note: In the event of a tie the order was determined by the better total non-counting scores.

Individual leaders

Place	Player	Country	Score	To par
1	Pia Babnik	Slovenia	65-70=135	−9
2	Frida Kinhult	Sweden	69-67=136	−8
3	Anna Zanusso	Italy	66-71=137	−7
4	Annabel Wilson	Ireland	70-68=138	−6
5	Ingrid Lindblad	Sweden	69-70=139	−5
T6	Alessandra Fanali	Italy	68-72=140	−4
T6	Vanessa Knecht	Switzerland	68-72=140	−4
T6	Alessia Nobilio	Italy	70-70=140	−4
T9	Hannah Darling	Scotland	70-71=141	−3
T9	Sara Kjellker	Sweden	70-71=141	−3
T9	Sara Kouskova	Czech Republic	70-71=141	−3
T9	Hazel MacGarvie	Scotland	69-72=141	−3
T9	Polly Mack	Germany	70-71=141	−3

Note: There was no official award for the lowest individual score.

Flight A

Bracket

Quarter finals
Italy	4
Ireland	3
Spain	4
Scotland	3
Germany	4.5
Denmark	2.5
Sweden	5.5
England	1.5

Semi finals
Spain	4
Italy	3
Sweden	6
Germany	1

Final
Sweden	5
Spain	2
Bronze match
Italy	5
Germany	2

Elimination matches
Scotland	3.5
Ireland	1.5
England	3.5
Denmark	1.5

Match for 5th place
England	3
Scotland	2
Match for 7th place
Ireland	3
Denmark	2

Final games

Sweden	Spain
5	2
L. Grant / M. Stark 4 & 3	T. Toscano / A. Pelaez
F. Kinhult / B. Wallin 2 holes	E. Hualde / M. Herraez Galvez
Sara Kjellker 4 & 3	Maria Herraez Galvez
Ingrid Lindblad	Marta Garcia Llorca 2 & 1
Beatrice Wallin AS *	Teresa Toscano AS *
Linn Grant AS *	Ana Pelaez AS *
Frida Kinhult 4 & 2	Elena Hualde

* Note: Game declared halved, since team match already decided.

Flight B

Bracket

Round 1
Russia	3
Slovenia	2
Czech Republic	3
Switzerland	2
Finland	5
Austria	0
France	3.5
Slovakia	1.5

Round 2
Czech Republic	4.5
Russia	0.5
France	3
Finland	2

Match for 9th place
Czech Republic	3
France	2
Match for 11th place
Finland	3
Russia	2

Elimination matches
Switzerland	3.5
Slovenia	1.5
Slovakia	3.5
Austria	1.5

Match for 13th place
Switzerland	4
Slovakia	1
Match for 15th place
Austria	3.5
Slovenia	1.5

Flight C

Team matches

1	Belgium	Turkey	0
5		0	

1	Netherlands	Iceland	0
4		1	

1	Belgium	Iceland	0
5		0	

1	Netherlands	Turkey	0
4		1	

1	Belgium	Netherlands	0
3		2	

1	Iceland	Turkey	0
3		2	

Team standings

Country	Place	W	T	L	Game points	Points
Belgium	17	3	0	0	13–2	3
Netherlands	18	2	0	1	10–5	2
Iceland	19	1	0	2	4–11	1
Turkey	20	0	0	3	3–12	0

Final standings

Place	Country
1st place, gold medalist(s)	Sweden
2nd place, silver medalist(s)	Spain
3rd place, bronze medalist(s)	Italy
4	Germany
5	England
6	Scotland
7	Ireland
8	Denmark
9	Czech Republic
10	France
11	Finland
12	Russia
13	Switzerland
14	Slovakia
15	Austria
16	Slovenia
17	Belgium
18	Netherlands
19	Iceland
20	Turkey

== See also ==
- Espirito Santo Trophy – biennial world amateur team golf championship for women organized by the International Golf Federation.
- European Amateur Team Championship – European amateur team golf championship for men organised by the European Golf Association.
- European Ladies Amateur Championship – European amateur individual golf championship for women organised by the European Golf Association.
