= Beatrice Wallin =

Swedish golfer (born 1999)

Personal information
- Full name: Veronika Beatrice Wallin
- Nickname: Bea
- Nationality: Sweden
- Born: 5 April 1999 (age 27) Olofstorp, Sweden
- Height: 5 ft 4 in (163 cm)

Career
- Sport: Golf
- College: Florida State University
- Turned professional: 2022
- Current tour: Epson Tour (joined 2022)

Best results in LPGA major championships
- Chevron Championship: DNP
- Women's PGA C'ship: DNP
- U.S. Women's Open: CUT: 2020, 2023
- Women's British Open: DNP
- Evian Championship: DNP

Achievements and awards
- ACC Golfer of the Year: 2021
- PGA of Sweden Future Fund Award: 2022

Veronika Beatrice Wallin (born 5 April 1999) is a Swedish professional golfer and Epson Tour player. As an amateur, she won the European Ladies' Team Championship in 2018, 2019 and 2020.

== Early life and amateur career ==
Before focusing on golf Wallin was a swimmer, inspired by her father Christer Wallin who represented Sweden in the 1988, 1992 and 1996 Summer Olympics, winning silver medals in Barcelona (1992) and Atlanta (1996).

Wallin joined the National Team in 2016 and was part of a golden era of Swedish success in European team championships. Her teams, which often included Linn Grant, Frida Kinhult, Amanda Linnér, Ingrid Lindblad and Maja Stark, was runner-up at the 2016 European Girls' Team Championship and won in 2017. They then went on to win the European Ladies' Team Championship in 2018, 2019 and 2020, and finished runner-up in 2021. She is attached to Hills Golf Club in Mölndal, close to Gothenburg, Sweden.

Wallin represented Sweden at the 2017 World Junior Girls Championship in Canada, and at The Spirit International Amateur Golf Championship in 2019 with Maja Stark.

Individually, Wallin finished 4th at the 2015 Annika Invitational Europe and won the event in 2016, which helped her qualify for the European teams at the 2016 Junior Ryder Cup and the 2017 Junior Solheim Cup. She was runner-up at the 2016 French International Ladies Amateur Championship (Trophée Cecile de Rothschild) and the 2017 French International Lady Juniors Amateur Championship (Trophée Esmond), and 3rd at the 2017 Portuguese Ladies Amateur.

In the summer of 2020, Wallin was runner-up in three professional tournaments on the 2020 Swedish Golf Tour, the GolfUppsala Open and the Didriksons Skaftö Open behind Ingrid Lindblad, and the Golfhäftet Masters behind Linn Grant.

She was invited to play in the 2020 U.S. Women's Open by virtue of her World Amateur Golf Ranking, which peaked at 4th.

Wallin was 4th at the 2021 European Ladies Amateur, and finished 5th at the 2021 Didriksons Skaftö Open, a Ladies European Tour event.

== College career ==
Wallin accepted a golf scholarship to Florida State University and played with the Florida State Seminoles women's golf team from 2018 to 2022. In 2021, she won two tournaments and was named Atlantic Coast Conference Golfer of the Year. In 2022, she became the first player in FSU women's golf history to win an NCAA regional outright, shooting 6-under par over the three-round event to beat Florida Atlantic's Letizia Bagnoli by one stroke. She became just the second four-time All-American in school history, after earning All-American Mention honors in 2019 and 2020, and All-American First-Team honors in 2021 and 2022.

She played in the inaugural Augusta National Women's Amateur in 2019, finishing 7th, and finished 10th at the 2021 installment, 3 strokes behind winner Tsubasa Kajitani of Japan. In 2022, she finished tied 4th, two strokes behind winner Anna Davis.

Wallin played in the 2021 Arnold Palmer Cup with a 3–1 individual record.

== Professional career ==
Wallin finished the eight-round 2021 LPGA Tour Q-Series tied at 60th, five shots short of a full LPGA card, but with Epson Tour status. She waited until after her graduation at the end of the 2022 spring semester to turn professional.

In 2023, Wallin made eight cuts in 19 events, recorded a season-best of tied 6th at the Hartford HealthCare Women's Championship, and finished 55th in the rankings. In 2024, she made 11 cuts in 17 starts and finished 67th in the rankings.

== Amateur wins ==
- 2011 Skandia Tour Regional #4, Skandia Tour Regional #5, Skandia Cup Riksfinal F13
- 2012 Skandia Tour Regional #1, Skandia Cup Riksfinal F13
- 2013 Innesvingen Junior Open, Chalmers Junior Open, Skandia Tour Riks #6
- 2014 Sötenäs Junior Open, Torslanda Junior Open
- 2015 Skandia Tour Elit #1
- 2016 Annika Invitational Europe
- 2021 Florida State Match Up, Pinetree Women's Collegiate
- 2022 NCAA Tallahassee Regional

== Results in LPGA majors ==
Tournament	2020	2021	2022	2023
Chevron Championship				
Women's PGA Championship				
U.S. Women's Open	CUT			CUT
The Evian Championship	NT			
Women's British Open				

Did not play

CUT = missed the half-way cut
NT = no tournament
T = tied

== Team appearances ==
Amateur

- European Girls' Team Championship (representing Sweden): 2015, 2016, 2017 (winners)
- European Ladies' Team Championship (representing Sweden): 2018 (winners), 2019 (winners), 2020 (winners), 2021
- Junior Ryder Cup (representing Europe): 2016
- Junior Solheim Cup (representing Europe): 2017
- World Junior Girls Championship (representing Sweden): 2017
- Espirito Santo Trophy (representing Sweden): 2018
- The Spirit International Amateur Golf Championship (representing Sweden): 2019
- Arnold Palmer Cup (representing the International Team): 2021
