= Lisa Pettersson =

Swedish professional golfer (born 1995)

Personal information
- Full name: Lisa Elida Pettersson
- Nationality: Sweden
- Born: 31 July 1995 (age 31) Täby, Stockholm, Sweden

Career
- Sport: Golf
- College: East Carolina University
- Turned professional: 2018
- Current tour: Ladies European Tour (joined 2022)
- Former tours: Symetra Tour (joined 2019); Swedish Golf Tour (joined 2018)
- Professional wins: 2

Number of wins by tour
- Ladies European Tour: 1
- Other: 1

Best results in LPGA major championships
- Chevron Championship: DNP
- Women's PGA C'ship: DNP
- U.S. Women's Open: DNP
- Women's British Open: CUT: 2023, 2024
- Evian Championship: DNP

Achievements and awards
- ECU Most Outstanding Female Scholar Athlete: 2018
- PGA Sweden Future Fund Award: 2020

Lisa Pettersson (born 31 July 1995) is a Swedish professional golfer and Ladies European Tour player. She won the 2023 Helsingborg Open, and finished runner-up at the 2022 Skaftö Open, 2022 Åland 100 Ladies Open, 2023 Women's Irish Open, 2025 Hills Ladies Open and 2026 Tipsport Czech Ladies Open.

== Early life and amateur career ==
Pettersson was born in Täby, Stockholm County, in 1995. She grew up practising a lot of different sports and it was not until the age of 15 that she started to focus solely on golf. In 2013, she finished tied third at the Annika Invitational Europe, behind Malene Krølbøll Hansen and Celia Barquin Arozamena.

She was in contention at the 2016 European Ladies Amateur Championship held at Hook Golf Club, Sweden. She was in second place behind Leslie Cloots of Belgium ahead of the final round. Pettersson had shot 72, 70 and 65 to put herself in a spot to make a challenge for the title, but a disappointing 75 on the final day saw her finish in a tie for 6th.

Pettersson played college golf with East Carolina University between 2014 and 2018, majoring in business. She was twice named First-Team All-American Athletic Conference and as a senior named ECU's Most Outstanding Female Scholar Athlete at the annual Breakfast of Champions.

== Professional career ==
After Pettersson graduated in 2018, she turned professional and played on the Swedish Golf Tour, where she was runner-up behind Sara Kjellker at the Carpe Diem Beds Trophy, tied for third at the Skaftö Open behind Malene Krølbøll Hansen and Filippa Möörk, and successfully defeated Sofie Bringner in the final of the Swedish Matchplay Championship.

In 2019, Pettersson joined the Symetra Tour, where her best finish was a solo third at the 2019 IOA Golf Classic, five strokes behind Marta Sanz Barrio.

Pettersson lost a playoff to Anna Nordqvist at the Cactus Tour's Moon Valley stop in March 2020, during the LPGA Tour's pandemic hiatus. Nordqvist shot a final-round 66 to tie Pettersson, and won with a 12-foot birdie putt on the second playoff hole.

=== Ladies European Tour ===
In December 2021, Pettersson finished in second place at the LET Q-School, on eight-under-par with rounds of 73, 71, 67, 70 and 72, securing a Ladies European Tour card for 2022. Pettersson finished third at the Aramco Team Series – London teamed with Whitney Hillier and Krista Bakker, and at the Aramco Team Series – Sotogrande she was the first draft pick by Anna Nordqvist.

In 2022, Pettersson held the clubhouse lead in the Skaftö Open at nine under, but had to settle for second place after Linn Grant shot back-to-back birdies on her final two holes to claim victory by one stroke. The following week she was the solo runner-up at the Åland 100 Ladies Open, one stroke behind Anne-Charlotte Mora who birdied four of the final five holes. She finished 4th in the Rookie of the Year rankings, behind Ines Laklalech, Ana Peláez and winner Linn Grant.

In 2023, Pettersson recorded her first-ever hole-in-one on the par-three eighth in the first round of the Magical Kenya Ladies Open. She claimed her first LET title by a stroke at the Helsingborg Open after making an eagle on the final hole.

In 2025, she finished runner-up at the Hills Ladies Open in Gothenburg, two strokes behind winner Meja Örtengren.

== Amateur wins ==
- 2013 Viksjö Junior Open
- 2014 Viksjö Junior Open
- 2016 Viksjö Junior Open, Pinehurst Challenge

== Professional wins (2) ==
=== Ladies European Tour wins (1) ===
No.	Date	Tournament	Winning score	To par	Margin of victory	Runner(s)-up
1	4 Jun 2023	Helsingborg Open	70-68-67=205	−11	1 stroke	(Spain) Ana Peláez

Ladies European Tour playoff record (0–2)

No.	Year	Tournament	Opponents	Result
1	2023	KPMG Women's Irish Open	(Denmark) Smilla Tarning Sønderby (Netherlands) Anne van Dam	Sønderby won with eagle on first extra hole
2	2026	Tipsport Czech Ladies Open	(Australia) Justice Bosio (Finland) Noora Komulainen	Komulainen won with birdie on first extra hole

=== Swedish Golf Tour wins (1) ===
No.	Date	Tournament	Winning score	To par	Margin of victory	Runner-up	Ref
1	30 Jun 2018	Swedish Matchplay Championship	19th			(Sweden) Sofie Bringner	
