= Helsingborg Open =

Coordinates: 56.0577°N 12.7864°E

Tournament information
- Location: Helsingborg, Sweden
- Established: 2010
- Course: Allerum Golf Club
- Par: 72
- Tour: Ladies European Tour
- Format: 54-hole Stroke play
- Prize fund: €300,000
- Month played: June

Tournament record score
- Aggregate: 271 Dewi Claire Schreefel (2014)
- To par: −17 as above

Current champion
- (France) Perrine Delacour

Location in the Sweden

The Helsingborg Open is a women's professional golf tournament held in Helsingborg, Sweden. It first featured on the Ladies European Tour (LET) in 2013.

The tournament was first played on the Swedish Golf Tour in 2010. The 2013 event marked the return of the LET to Sweden following a hiatus, after the last installments of the Scandinavian TPC hosted by Annika and the Göteborg Masters were played in 2008. Vasatorp hosted the Compaq Open in 2002.

It was held at Vasatorp Golf Club until it moved to Allerum Golf Club in 2023.

== Winners ==
Date	Tour	Location	Winner	Score	Margin of victory	Runner(s)-up	Purse	Ref
Dormy Open Helsingborg
2024	LET	Perrine Delacour	France	205 (−11)	Playoff	(Germany) Helen Briem (a)	€300,000	
Helsingborg Open
2023	LET	Lisa Pettersson	Sweden	205 (−11)	1 stroke	(Spain) Ana Peláez	€300,000	
2016–2022: No tournament
2015	LET	Nicole Broch Larsen	Denmark	280 (−8)	1 stroke	(South Africa) Ashleigh Simon	€250,000	
2014	LET	Dewi Claire Schreefel	Netherlands	271 (−17)	7 strokes	(Australia) Rebecca Artis	€250,000	
2013	LET	Rebecca Artis	Australia	280 (−8)	1 stroke	(Sweden) Caroline Hedwall	€250,000	
2012: No tournament
Helsingborg Ladies Open
2011	SGT	Maria Bodén	Sweden	222 (+6)	3 strokes	(Sweden) Eva Bjärvall (Sweden) Isabella Ramsay (Sweden) Camilla Svensson (United States) Mary Mattson (Sweden) Anna Dahlberg Söderström	kr 200,000	
Volkswagen Helsingborg Open
2010	SGT	Anna Tybring	Sweden	227 (+11)	Playoff	(Finland) Sohvi Härkönen (Sweden) Erika Holmén (Sweden) Johanna Westerberg	kr 250,000	
