= Kaitlyn Papp =

American professional golfer (born c. 1998)

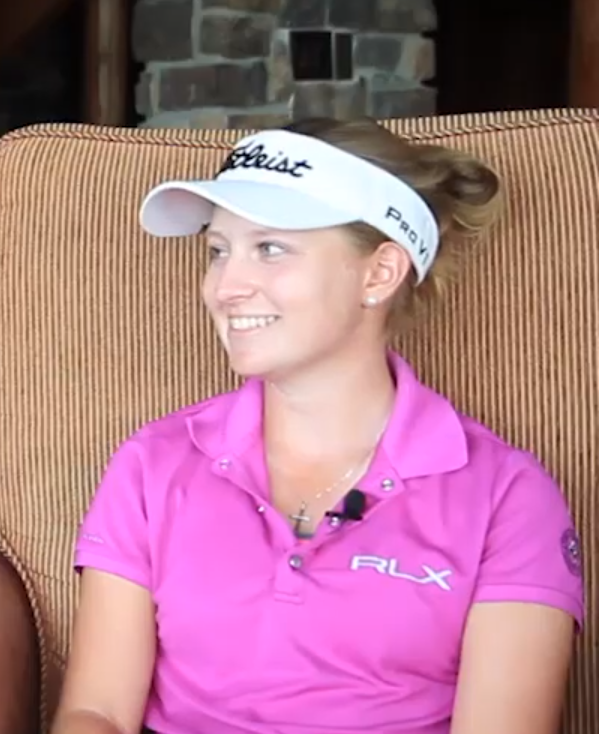

Personal information
- Nationality: United States
- Born: c. 1998

Career
- Sport: Golf
- Turned professional: 2021
- Current tour: Epson Tour
- Former tour: LPGA Tour
- Professional wins: 1

Best results in LPGA major championships
- Chevron Championship: CUT: 2020
- Women's PGA C'ship: CUT: 2022, 2024
- U.S. Women's Open: T9: 2020
- Women's British Open: DNP
- Evian Championship: DNP

Kaitlyn Papp (born c. 1998) is an American professional golfer.

== Amateur career ==
Papp competed for the Texas Longhorns golf team, where she was a two-time First Team All-American.

In 2016, Papp teamed with Hailee Cooper to win the U.S. Women's Amateur Four-Ball. She played on the U.S. teams in the Junior Solheim Cup (2015, 2017), Junior Ryder Cup (2016), and Arnold Palmer Cup (2018, 2019).

Papp earned low amateur honors at the 2020 U.S. Women's Open, finishing tied for 9th. During the tournament, her college coach was her caddie.

== Professional career ==
Papp turned professional in June 2021. She earned her card for the 2022 LPGA Tour through qualifying school.

== Amateur wins ==
- 2014 The PING Invitational
- 2015 AJGA Girls Championship
- 2018 Northrop Grumman Regional Challenge, Dr Donnis Thompson Invitational

== Professional wins (1) ==
=== Annika Women's All Pro Tour wins (1) ===
- 2026 Lake Charles Championship

== Results in LPGA majors ==
Tournament	2019	2020	2021	2022	2023	2024
Chevron Championship		CUT				
U.S. Women's Open	CUT	T9	CUT			CUT
Women's PGA Championship				CUT		CUT
The Evian Championship		NT				
Women's British Open						

Top 10
Did not play

CUT = missed the half-way cut
NT = no tournament
T = tied

== U.S. national team appearances ==
- Junior Solheim Cup: 2015 (winners), 2017 (winners)
- Junior Ryder Cup: 2016 (winners)
- Arnold Palmer Cup: 2018 (winners), 2019, 2020
- The Spirit International Amateur Golf Championship: 2019
