= Maja Stark =

Swedish professional golfer (born 1999)

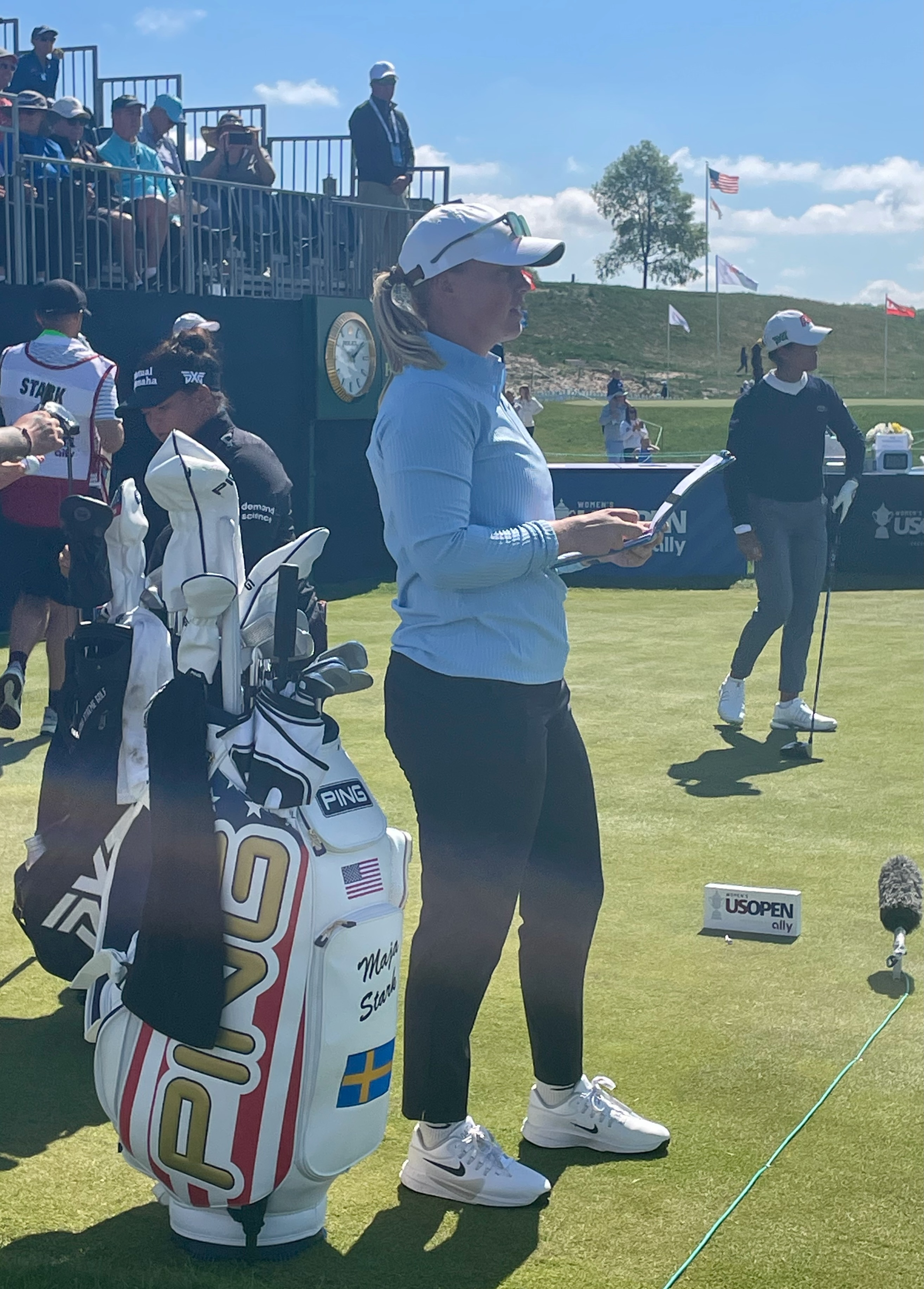
- Stark at 2025 U.S. Women's Open

Personal information
- Full name: Maja Sofia Stark
- Nationality: Sweden
- Born: 10 December 1999 (age 26) Skurup, Sweden
- Height: 5 ft 9 in (175 cm)

Career
- Sport: Golf
- College: Oklahoma State
- Turned professional: 2021
- Current tours: LPGA Tour; Ladies European Tour
- Professional wins: 9

Number of wins by tour
- LPGA Tour: 2
- Ladies European Tour: 6
- WPGA Tour of Australasia: 1
- Other: 2

Best results in LPGA major championships (wins: 1)
- Chevron Championship: 2nd: 2024
- Women's PGA C'ship: T37: 2026
- U.S. Women's Open: Won: 2025
- Women's British Open: T36: 2026
- Evian Championship: T10: 2026

Achievements and awards
- Big 12 Player of the Year: 2020–21
- Swedish Golfer of the Year: 2025

Maja Sofia Stark (born 10 December 1999) is a Swedish professional golfer. She won her first major title at the 2025 U.S. Women's Open. She has six Ladies European Tour titles, and she earned LPGA Tour membership through her victory at the 2022 ISPS Handa World Invitational. As an amateur, she was in contention at the 2020 and 2021 U.S. Women's Open, and after turning professional in August 2021, she won two tournaments in three starts on the Ladies European Tour.

== Amateur career ==
Stark grew up in Abbekås, Skåne County, and joined the Swedish National Team in 2016. She represented her country at the European Girls' Team Championship, where Sweden earned the silver in 2016 and won the gold in 2017. She was then part of the Swedish teams that won the European Ladies' Team Championship in 2018, 2019 and 2020, teamed with Frida Kinhult, Sara Kjellker, Ingrid Lindblad, Linn Grant, and Beatrice Wallin. She was also a member of the 2017 European Junior Solheim Cup team.

In August 2019, Stark made two starts in the LET Access Series and was runner-up at both, the Anna Nordqvist Västerås Open and the Swedish PGA Championship.

Stark was a freshman at Oklahoma State University in 2019–20, where she won the Hurricane Invitational in just her second career start. She won the 2020 Arnold Palmer Cup at Bay Hill Club and Lodge, Bay Hill, Florida with the International team. She won two individual titles and ended the season ranked No. 4 by GolfStat with a 49–2 record in head-to-head competition against top-100 players in the country. She recorded a stroke average of 70.48, which destroyed the previous school record (71.14) set by Caroline Hedwall in 2010.

Stark rose to 6th place in the World Amateur Golf Ranking in July 2020 and received an exemption for the 2020 U.S. Women's Open as one of the 20 leading amateurs, her first major championship, where she finished tied for 13th. At the 2021 U.S. Women's Open she was tied for 9th after the third round, and finished tied for 16th after a final round of 74.

== Professional career ==
Stark turned professional in August 2021, with the intention to play on the Swedish Golf Tour and by invitations on the Ladies European Tour (LET), aiming to qualify for the LPGA Tour through qualifying school. She won her first professional title, the PGA Championship by Trelleborgs Kommun on the LET Access Series, in her second career start the same month.

In early September, Stark claimed her first LET title at the Creekhouse Ladies Open, finishing four shots ahead of compatriot Linn Grant, in the process earning membership of the LET. Less than a month later, she won her second LET title at the Estrella Damm Ladies Open.

Stark started her 2022 LET season strong. She was runner-up and low woman at the Trust Golf Asian Mixed Stableford Challenge in Thailand, fending off all but Sihwan Kim of the Asian Tour. On the two stops of the LET's Australian swing, she was runner-up at the Australian Ladies Classic, one stroke behind Meghan MacLaren, and won the Women's NSW Open by five strokes ahead of compatriot Johanna Gustavsson.

In July she won the Amundi German Masters by one stroke over Leonie Harm and Jessica Karlsson, re-taking the top spot in the Order of Merit ahead of Linn Grant and Johanna Gustavsson.

In August, she won the ISPS Handa World Invitational in Northern Ireland with a commanding five stroke margin. The event, co-sanctioned between the LPGA and LET, was played concurrently with a tournament on the European Tour on the same course. The victory earned her membership of the LPGA Tour. Stark made her LPGA debut as a member at the Portland Classic where she finished top-10, three strokes behind winner Andrea Lee.

Stark started 2023 with a runner-up finish at the LPGA Tour's Hilton Grand Vacations Tournament of Champions in January, and won her sixth LET title four shots ahead of Linn Grant at the Lalla Meryem Cup in February. In September, she represented Europe in the Solheim Cup for the first time in her career. She went 2–1–1 in the event, including a Sunday singles win against the reigning U.S. Open champion, Allisen Corpuz to help Team Europe stage a comeback from behind to retain the cup.

In April 2024, Stark finished solo second to world number one Nelly Korda at the 2024 Chevron Championship, at that time, her career-best finish in a major championship.

Stark won her first major title at the 2025 U.S. Women's Open at Erin Hills in Erin, Wisconsin. She secured a two-stroke margin of victory and became the first Swedish winner of the event since Annika Sörenstam in 2006.

== Awards and honors ==
In her sophomore year 2020–2021 at Oklahoma State University, Stark was awarded Big 12 Conference Player of the Year, and was the Big 12's lone WGCA First Team All-American.

In 2021, she received Elit Sign number 148 by the Swedish Golf Federation based on world ranking achievements.

In 2024, she was awarded honorary membership in the PGA of Sweden.

== Amateur wins ==
- 2013 Skandia Tour Distrikt #2, Skandia Tour Regional #6, Skandia Distrikt Skåne Final
- 2015 Skandia Tour Riks #1, Skandia Tour Elit #2, Skandia Tour Riks #4
- 2017 Skandia Tour Elit #1
- 2020 Hurricane Invitational
- 2021 Heroes Ladies Intercollegiate, Mountain View Collegiate

== Professional wins (9) ==
=== LPGA Tour wins (2) ===
Legend
Major championships (1)
Other LPGA Tour (1)

No.	Date	Tournament	Winning score	To par	Margin of victory	Runner(s)-up	Winner's share ($)
1	14 Aug 2022	ISPS Handa World Invitational^{[1]}	69-70-69-63=271	−20	5 strokes	(United States) Allisen Corpuz	225,000
2	1 Jun 2025	U.S. Women's Open	70-69-70-72=281	−7	2 strokes	(United States) Nelly Korda (Japan) Rio Takeda	2,400,000

^{1} Co-sanctioned by the Ladies European Tour.

=== Ladies European Tour wins (6) ===
No.	Date	Tournament	Winning score	To par	Margin of victory	Runner(s)-up
1	5 Sep 2021	Creekhouse Ladies Open	72-65-71-71=279	−9	4 strokes	(Sweden) Linn Grant
2	3 Oct 2021	Estrella Damm Ladies Open	74-69-65=208	−8	2 strokes	(Slovenia) Pia Babnik
3	1 May 2022	Women's NSW Open^{[2]}	68-69-66-70=273	−15	5 strokes	(Sweden) Johanna Gustavsson
4	3 Jul 2022	Amundi German Masters	68-68-67-70=273	−15	1 stroke	(Germany) Leonie Harm (Sweden) Jessica Karlsson
5	14 Aug 2022	ISPS Handa World Invitational^{[3]}	69-70-69-63=271	−20	5 strokes	(United States) Allisen Corpuz
6	11 Feb 2023	Lalla Meryem Cup	71-67-69=207	−12	4 strokes	(Sweden) Linn Grant

^{2} Co-sanctioned by the WPGA Tour of Australasia.
^{3} Co-sanctioned by the LPGA Tour.

=== LET Access Series wins (1) ===
No.	Date	Tournament	Winning score	To par	Margin of victory	Runner-up
1	23 Aug 2021	PGA Championship by Trelleborgs Kommun^{[4]}	67-70-68=205	−8	1 stroke	(England) Lily May Humphreys

^{4} Co-sanctioned by the Swedish Golf Tour.

=== Other wins (1) ===
- 2016 Wake Up Skurup! Open (Swedish Mini tour Futures Series) (as an amateur)

== Major championships ==
=== Wins (1) ===
Year	Championship	54 holes	Winning score	Margin	Runners-up
2025	U.S. Women's Open	1 shot lead	−7 (70-69-70-72=281)	2 strokes	(United States) Nelly Korda, (Japan) Rio Takeda

=== Results timeline ===
Results not in chronological order.

Tournament	2020	2021	2022	2023	2024	2025	2026
Chevron Championship				T37	2	T44	T21
U.S. Women's Open	T13	T16	CUT	T9	CUT	1	T8
Women's PGA Championship				CUT	T60	T47	T37
The Evian Championship	NT		CUT	CUT	T39	CUT	T10
Women's British Open			T41	T50	T71	CUT	T36

Win
Top 10
Did not play

CUT = missed the half-way cut
NT = no tournament
T = tied

=== Summary ===
Tournament	Wins	2nd	3rd	Top-5	Top-10	Top-25	Events	Cuts made
Chevron Championship	0	1	0	1	1	2	4	4
U.S. Women's Open	1	0	0	1	3	5	7	5
Women's PGA Championship	0	0	0	0	0	0	4	3
The Evian Championship	0	0	0	0	1	1	5	2
Women's British Open	0	0	0	0	0	0	5	4
Totals	1	1	0	2	5	8	25	18

- Most consecutive cuts made – 6 (2024 Women's PGA − 2025 Women's PGA)
- Longest streak of top-10s – 1 (five times)

== World ranking ==
Position in Women's World Golf Rankings at the end of each calendar year.

Year	Ranking	Source
2018	770	
2019	641	
2020	321	
2021	90	
2022	41	
2023	47	
2024	27	
2025	15	

== Team appearances ==
Amateur

- European Girls' Team Championship (representing Sweden): 2016, 2017 (winners)
- European Ladies' Team Championship (representing Sweden): 2018 (winners), 2019 (winners), 2020 (winners), 2021
- Junior Solheim Cup (representing Europe): 2017
- Arnold Palmer Cup (representing the International team): 2020 (winners)

Professional

- International Crown (representing Sweden): 2023, 2025
- Solheim Cup: 2023 (tie, cup retained), 2024, 2026 (winners)

=== Solheim Cup record ===
Year	Total matches	Total W–L–H	Singles W–L–H	Foursomes W–L–H	Fourballs W–L–H	Points won	Points %
Career	12	6–4–2	1–1–1	4–2–0	1–1–1	7	58.3
2023	4	2–1–1	1–0–0 def. A. Corpuz 2&1	1–1–0 lost w/ L. Grant 2&1 won w/ L. Grant 1 up	0–0–1 tied w/ E. Pedersen	2.5	62.5
2024	4	1–2–1	0–0–1 tied w/ L. Coughlin	1–1–0 won w/ E. Pedersen 2 up lost w/ G. Hall 4&3	0–1–0 lost w/ E. Pedersen 3&2	1.5	37.5
2026	4	3–1–0	0–1–0 lost to L. Duncan 3&1	2–0–0 won w/ L. Grant 3&2 won w/ L. Grant 3&2	1–0–0 won w/ L. Grant 2&1	3	75.0
