= Linn Grant =

Swedish professional golfer (born 1999)

Personal information
- Full name: Linn Maria Grant
- Nationality: Sweden
- Born: 20 June 1999 (age 27) Helsingborg, Sweden

Career
- Sport: Golf
- College: Arizona State University
- Turned professional: 2021
- Current tours: LPGA Tour (joined 2022); Ladies European Tour (joined 2022)
- Professional wins: 13

Number of wins by tour
- LPGA Tour: 2
- Ladies European Tour: 6
- Other: 6

Best results in LPGA major championships
- Chevron Championship: T17: 2024
- Women's PGA C'ship: T9: 2024
- U.S. Women's Open: T9: 2025
- Women's British Open: T10: 2024
- Evian Championship: T8: 2022

Achievements and awards
- Nordic Golf Tour Order of Merit: 2020
- Sunshine Ladies Tour Order of Merit: 2022
- Ladies European Tour Rookie of the Year: 2022
- Ladies European Tour Order of Merit winner: 2022
- Ladies European Tour Player of the Year: 2022
- Swedish Golfer of the Year: 2022

Linn Maria Grant (born 20 June 1999) is a Swedish professional golfer who plays on the LPGA Tour and Ladies European Tour. She has won twice on the LPGA Tour. As an amateur, she won the 2017 Ladies' British Open Amateur Stroke Play Championship.

== Family and early years ==
Grant is the granddaughter of James Grant, a Scottish golf professional who emigrated from Inverness in Scotland to Helsingborg in Sweden. The Grant family has had a fair bit of success on Catriona Matthew's home track, North Berwick Golf Club. James won the Scottish Boys Championship on the course, and Linn won the British Amateur Stroke Play Championship there, 49 years later. James died when Linn was 6 years old. Her father John played on the Swedish Golf Tour and has seven wins on the Swedish Senior Tour.

== Amateur career ==
Grant joined the Swedish National Team in 2016 and represented her country at the European Girls' Team Championship, where Sweden was runner-up in 2016 and winner in 2017. She was part of the 3rd place team at the World Junior Girls Championship in Canada in 2017. She was then part of the Swedish teams that won the European Ladies' Team Championship a record three times in 2018, 2019 and 2020, teamed with Frida Kinhult, Sara Kjellker, Amanda Linnér, Maja Stark and Beatrice Wallin.

She also excelled individually. In 2016 she won the Doral-Publix Junior Classic and the Junior Masters Invitational. In 2017 she won the German Girls Open and recorded a season's Scottish double as she won the Helen Holm Scottish Women's Open Championship at Royal Troon by five strokes and the Ladies' British Open Amateur Stroke Play Championship at North Berwick Golf Club.

She was runner-up at the 2018 Major Champions Invitational in Florida, finished tied for fifth at the 2019 European Ladies Amateur Championship and was a semifinalist at the 2019 British Ladies Amateur. Her achievements earned her an invitation to play at the inaugural Augusta National Women's Amateur in 2019.

Grant was a member of the 2017 European Junior Solheim Cup team and represented the Continent of Europe on the winning 2019 Vagliano Trophy team. She was selected to represent the International Team at the 2020 Arnold Palmer Cup.

In 2018, Grant won the qualification for the 2018 Women's British Open at St Annes Old Links Golf Club with a round of 62 (−10), however she missed the cut in the Women's Open at Royal Lytham & St Annes Golf Club after rounds of 78 and 72. She also won the sectional qualification for the 2018 U.S. Women's Open at Buckinghamshire Golf Club with rounds of 67 and 70, seven strokes ahead of the runner-up Catriona Matthew and nine ahead of the third qualifier Mel Reid. In the U.S. Open at Shoal Creek Club, Grant was tied for fourth and best amateur after opening rounds of 69 and 72, and finished tied for 57th after final rounds of 78 and 81.

Grant was a freshman at Arizona State University in 2019–20, along with compatriot Amanda Linnér. She won her first varsity tournament for the Arizona State Sun Devils at the Dr Donnis Thompson Invitational in Honolulu in March 2020.

Grant was in contention at the 2020 U.S. Women's Open. Over the summer in 2020, she played on the Nordic Golf Tour where she won the GolfUppsala Open. She lost in a playoff to Ingrid Lindblad at the 2020 Skaftö Open, but a few weeks later won the Swedish Matchplay Championship, just like Anna Nordqvist, Caroline Hedwall, Maria Hjorth, Helen Alfredsson and Liselotte Neumann before her. With the win, Grant secured victory in the 2020 Nordic Golf Tour Order of Merit, named the Road to Creekhouse Ladies Open, still an amateur not allowed to receive prize money, and a spot at the Creekhouse Ladies Open at Kristianstad Golf Club on the 2021 Ladies European Tour. She was ranked 5th on the World Amateur Golf Ranking.

Playing with the Arizona State Sun Devils, Grant won three consecutive individual tournament titles in the spring of 2021.

== Professional career ==
Grant announced her turning professional in August 2021, ranked 4th in the World Amateur Golf Ranking. In her first month as a professional, Grant claimed two successive second-place finishes on the Ladies European Tour, at the Skaftö Open and the Creekhouse Ladies Open. In October she won her first tournament as a professional, the Terre Blanche Ladies Open in France.

In December 2021, she earned her LPGA Tour card at the LPGA Final Qualifying Tournament.

In February 2022, Grant won two titles on the Sunshine Ladies Tour in South Africa. In March, she won her first Ladies European Tour title at the co-sanctioned the Joburg Ladies Open. After a tie for 7th at the season-ending Investec South African Women's Open she captured the Sunshine Ladies Tour's Order of Merit title, ahead of Lee-Anne Pace.

In June 2022, Grant became the first woman to win on the European Tour, at the time named the DP World Tour, by winning the Volvo Car Scandinavian Mixed at Halmstad Golf Club in Sweden, a tournament with a field mixed of 78 women and 78 men, playing from different tees for the same title and the same prize money, but divided when counting for the women on the Ladies European Tour and for the men on the European Tour. Grant went into the final round with a two shot lead, and went on to score an 8-under-par 64 in the last round, and to win by nine strokes ahead of the nearest men and 14 strokes ahead of the nearest women.

After finishing runner-up in 2020 and 2021, Grant won the 2022 Skaftö Open by one stroke ahead of Lisa Pettersson.

Grant played only six events in her rookie season on the LPGA Tour in 2022, garnering four top-10 finishes in the process. Although accumulating enough points to qualify for the CME Group Tour Championship, Grant did not participate in the tour's season-ending event due to her COVID vaccination status. Grant said through a statement via her agent, "with travel restrictions to enter the U.S. still remaining, it is still not an option for me to play LPGA events in the U.S. This is the sole reason I am not playing the CME."

In May 2023, travel restrictions to enter the U.S. were lifted, and Grant started playing LPGA Tour events in the U.S. In her fourth start on U.S. soil since the release, she captured her first LPGA Tour win in July 2023 at the Dana Open. It was the 120th Swedish LPGA Tour win and she became the 14th Swedish LPGA Tour winner. On the same day as her triumph, a Swedish player won on the men's tour, Vincent Norrman at the Barbasol Championship on the PGA Tour.

In June 2024, Grant won on the Volvo Car Scandinavian Mixed for a second time, after starting the final day 11 shots behind 54-hole leader Sebastian Söderberg, achieving the biggest comeback ever in a golf tournament.

In November 2025, Grant captured her second title on the LPGA Tour, winning The Annika. The tournament was hosted by Grant's fellow countrywomen Annika Sörenstam and marked the 125th win on the LPGA Tour by a Swedish player. It was the second time Grant won a tournament hosted by Sörenstam as was the case with her triumph at the 2022 Scandinavian Mixed hosted by Annika.

== Awards, honors ==
In 2021, she received Elit Sign number 146 by the Swedish Golf Federation based on world ranking achievements.

She was named as the Swedish Golfer of the Year, male or female, professional or amateur, for the 2022 season.

In 2024, she was awarded honorary member of the PGA of Sweden.

== Amateur wins ==
- 2016 Skandia Tour Elit #5, Junior Masters Invitational, Doral-Publix Junior Classic
- 2017 Helen Holm Scottish Women's Open Championship, German Girls Open, Ladies' British Open Amateur Stroke Play Championship
- 2020 Dr. Donnis Thompson Invitational
- 2021 Sun Devil Winter Classic, Bruin Wave Invitational, The Clover Cup

== Professional wins (13) ==
=== LPGA Tour wins (2) ===
Legend
Major championships (0)
Other LPGA Tour (2)

No.	Date	Tournament	Winning score	To par	Margin of victory	Runner-up	Winner's share ($)
1	16 July 2023	Dana Open	64-69-62-68=263	−21	3 strokes	(United States) Allisen Corpuz	262,500
2	16 Nov 2025	The Annika	68-63-65-65=261	–19	3 strokes	(United States) Jennifer Kupcho	487,500

=== Ladies European Tour wins (6) ===
No.	Date	Tournament	Winning score	To par	Margin of victory	Runner(s)-up
1	26 Mar 2022	Joburg Ladies Open^{1}	72-69-67=208	−11	5 strokes	(Switzerland) Kim Métraux
2	29 May 2022	Mithra Belgian Ladies Open	66-68-67=201	−15	1 stroke	(England) Cara Gainer
3	12 Jun 2022	Volvo Car Scandinavian Mixed^{2}	66-68-66-64=264	−24	9 strokes	(Sweden) Henrik Stenson, (Scotland) Marc Warren
4	28 Aug 2022	Skaftö Open	67-62-68=197	−10	1 stroke	(Sweden) Lisa Pettersson
5	13 May 2023	Jabra Ladies Open	68-67-69=204	−9	2 strokes	(Netherlands) Anne van Dam, (France) Céline Herbin
6	9 Jun 2024	Volvo Car Scandinavian Mixed^{2} (2)	67-68-71-65=271	−17	1 stroke	(Scotland) Calum Hill, (Sweden) Sebastian Söderberg

^{1}Co-sanctioned by the Sunshine Ladies Tour
^{2}Mixed event with the European Tour

=== Sunshine Ladies Tour wins (3) ===
No.	Date	Tournament	Winning score	To par	Margin of victory	Runner-up
1	13 Feb 2022	Dimension Data Ladies Challenge	72-67-67=206	−10	7 strokes	(South Africa) Nicole Garcia
2	25 Feb 2022	Jabra Ladies Classic	69-72-65=206	−10	2 strokes	(South Africa) Paula Reto
3	26 Mar 2022	Joburg Ladies Open^{1}	72-69-67=208	−11	5 strokes	(Switzerland) Kim Métraux

^{1}Co-sanctioned by the Ladies European Tour

=== LET Access Series wins (1) ===
No.	Date	Tournament	Winning score	To par	Margin of victory	Runner-up
1	9 Oct 2021	Terre Blanche Ladies Open	68-66-72=206	−10	4 strokes	(Denmark) Amalie Leth-Nissen (a)

=== Nordic Golf Tour (2) ===
No.	Date	Tournament	Winning score	To par	Margin of victory	Runner-up
1	25 Jul 2020	GolfUppsala Open (as an amateur)	71-68-71=210	–9	1 stroke	(Sweden) Beatrice Wallin (a)
2	9 Oct 2020	Swedish Matchplay Championship (as an amateur)	3 & 2			(Sweden) Rebecca Gyllner (a)

== Results in LPGA majors ==
Results not in chronological order.

Tournament	2018	2019	2020	2021	2022	2023	2024	2025	2026
Chevron Championship							T17	CUT	CUT
U.S. Women's Open	T57		T23			T53	CUT	T9	CUT
Women's PGA Championship						T20	T9	CUT	CUT
The Evian Championship			NT		T8	T16	T26	CUT	T61
Women's British Open	CUT				T19	T11	T10	T19	CUT

Top 10
Did not play

CUT = missed the half-way cut
NT = no tournament
T = tied

=== Summary ===
Tournament	Wins	2nd	3rd	Top-5	Top-10	Top-25	Events	Cuts made
Chevron Championship	0	0	0	0	0	1	3	1
U.S. Women's Open	0	0	0	0	1	2	6	4
Women's PGA Championship	0	0	0	0	1	2	4	2
The Evian Championship	0	0	0	0	1	2	5	4
Women's British Open	0	0	0	0	1	4	6	4
Totals	0	0	0	0	4	11	24	15

- Most consecutive cuts made – 8 (2020 U.S. Women's Open – 2024 Chevron)
- Longest streak of top-10s – 1 (four times)

== LPGA Tour career summary ==
Year	Tournaments played	Cuts made*	Wins	2nd	3rd	Top 10s	Best finish	Earnings ($)	Money list rank	Scoring average	Scoring rank
2018	2	1	0	0	0	0	T57	n/a	n/a	75.00	n/a
2019	Did not play										
2020	1	1	0	0	0	0	T23	n/a	n/a	72.75	n/a
2021	Did not play										
2022	6	5	0	0	1	4	3	452,828	57	69.50	n/a
2023	16	15	1	0	1	4	1	1,026,279	25	70.02	8
2024	22	19	0	0	1	5	T3	1,114,951	27	70.59	16
2025	20	12	1	0	2	5	1	1,403,014	26	70.69	33
Totals	64 (2022)	51 (2022)	2	0	5	18	1	3,997,072	128		

Official as of 2025 season
*Includes matchplay and other tournaments without a cut.

== World ranking ==
Position in Women's World Golf Rankings at the end of each calendar year.

Year	World ranking	Source
2018	698	
2019	989	
2020	491	
2021	259	
2022	26	
2023	18	
2024	28	
2025	28	

== Team appearances ==
Amateur

- European Girls' Team Championship (representing Sweden): 2016, 2017 (winners)
- European Ladies' Team Championship (representing Sweden): 2018 (winners), 2019 (winners), 2020 (winners), 2021
- World Junior Girls Championship (representing Sweden): 2016, 2017
- Junior Solheim Cup (representing Europe): 2017
- Espirito Santo Trophy (representing Sweden): 2018
- Vagliano Trophy (representing the Continent of Europe): 2019 (winners)
- Arnold Palmer Cup (representing the International Team): 2020 (winners)

Professional

- Solheim Cup (representing Europe): 2023 (tie, cup retained), 2024, 2026 (winners)
- International Crown (representing Sweden): 2025

=== Solheim Cup record ===
Year	Total matches	Total W–L–H	Singles W–L–H	Foursomes W–L–H	Fourballs W–L–H	Points won	Points %
Career	13	7–6–0	1–2–0	3–2–0	3–2–0	7	53.8
2023	5	3–2–0	0–1–0 lost to M. Khang 1 dn	1–1–0 lost w/ M. Stark 2&1 won w/ M. Stark 1 up	2–0–0 won w/ C. Ciganda 4&2 won w/ C. Ciganda 2&1	3	60.0
2024	4	0–4–0	0–1–0 lost to J. Kupcho 2&1	0–1–0 lost w/ C. Ciganda 3&2	0–2–0 lost w/ C. Hull 5&4 lost w/ C. Boutier 6&4	0	0.0
2026	4	4–0–0	1–0–0 def. A. Yin 4&3	2–0–0 won w/ M. Stark 3&2 won w/ M. Stark 3&2	1–0–0 won w/ M. Stark 2&1	4	100.0
