= Skaftö Open =

Coordinates: 58.2323°N 11.4534°E

Tournament information
- Location: Fiskebäckskil, Sweden
- Established: 2018
- Course: Skaftö Golf Club
- Par: 69
- Tour: Ladies European Tour
- Format: Stroke play
- Prize fund: €250,000
- Month played: August

Tournament record score
- Aggregate: 196 Pauline Roussin-Bouchard (2021); 196 Esther Henseleit (2019)
- To par: −11 as above

Current champion
- (Sweden) Linn Grant

Location in Europe

The Skaftö Open is a professional golf tournament on the Ladies European Tour (LET).

The tournament is played in Sweden at Skaftö Golf Club in Fiskebäckskil, north of Gothenburg. It was first played on the Swedish Golf Tour in 2018, before being elevated to the LET Access Series in 2019 and to the LET in 2021, the second of three LET events in Sweden that season.

The 2020 event was withdrawn from the LET Access Series schedule and played as part of the newly established Nordic Golf Tour due to the COVID-19 pandemic.

== Winners ==
Year	Tour	Winner	Country	Score	Margin of victory	Runner(s)-up	Prize fund (€)
Didriksons Skaftö Open
2022	LET	Linn Grant	Sweden	−10 (67-62-68=197)	1 stroke	(Sweden) Lisa Pettersson	250,000
2021	LET	Pauline Roussin-Bouchard	France	−11 (68-60-68=196)	1 stroke	(Sweden) Linn Grant (Argentina) Magdalena Simmermacher	220,000
2020	NGT; ~~LETAS~~ (Note: Withdrawn due to the COVID-19 pandemic.)	Ingrid Lindblad (a)	Sweden	−9 (68-65-65=198)	Playoff	(Sweden) Linn Grant (a) (Sweden) Beatrice Wallin (a)	SEK 300,000; ~~60,000~~
Skaftö Open
2019	LETAS	Esther Henseleit	Germany	−11 (64-68-64=196)	1 stroke	(Sweden) Lynn Carlsson	50,000
2018	SGT	Malene Krølbøll Hansen (a)	Denmark	−7 (67-68-65=200)	4 strokes	(Sweden) Filippa Möörk	SEK 300,000
