= Frida Kinhult =

Swedish professional golfer (born 1999)

Personal information
- Full name: Frida Mikaela Kinhult
- Nationality: Sweden
- Born: 25 September 1999 (age 27) Fiskebäckskil, Sweden
- Life partner: Vincent Norrman

Career
- Sport: Golf
- College: Florida State
- Turned professional: 2019
- Current tour: LPGA Tour (joined 2021)
- Former tour: Symetra Tour (joined 2020)
- Professional wins: 1

Number of wins by tour
- Epson Tour: 1

Best results in LPGA major championships
- Chevron Championship: T76: 2025
- Women's PGA C'ship: 69th: 2024
- U.S. Women's Open: T24: 2022
- Women's British Open: CUT: 2018, 2019
- Evian Championship: CUT: 2022, 2023, 2024, 2026

Achievements and awards
- ACC Player of the Year: 2018-19
- ACC Freshman of the Year: 2018-19
- WGCA Freshman of the Year: 2018-19

Frida Mikaela Kinhult (born 25 September 1999) is a Swedish professional golfer and LPGA Tour player. She was number one in the World Amateur Golf Ranking in 2019, and won the 2020 Symetra Tour Championship to graduate to the LPGA Tour.

== Early life and amateur career ==
The daughter of a golf professional, Kinhult started playing the game at an early age at Skaftö Golf Club in Fiskebäckskil, on the small Swedish west coast island Skaftö with 1,400 inhabitants. Her three years older brother Marcus Kinhult became a professional golfer at 19 years of age to play on the European Tour and won the 2019 Betfred British Masters.

Kinhult has played on the Swedish national team since 2013. Representing her country, she was part of the teams winning the 2017 European Girls' Team Championship and the 2018 and 2019 European Ladies' Team Championship. She has represented Europe in the Patsy Hankins Trophy, Junior Ryder Cup, Junior Solheim Cup, and won the 2019 Vagliano Trophy. Individually, she won the Spanish International Ladies Amateur Championship in 2017 and then successfully defended her title in 2018.

In 2015, aged 15, she started in her first Ladies European Tour event, the Helsingborg Open, and two years later she finished top-10 at Andalucia Costa Del Sol Open De España Femenino. She participated in three majors as a teenager. The win of the 2017 European Girls' Team Championship exempted her from pre-qualifying for the 2018 Women's British Open. She later received an invitation to the 2019 ANA Inspiration (foregoing her spot at Augusta National Women's Amateur played the same week) and qualified for the 2019 Women's British Open.

In the fall of 2018 Kinhult moved to Tallahassee to play golf at Florida State University. As a freshman, she won two tournaments and set the Seminoles' single-season scoring average record of 70.66, was a WGCA First Team All-American, shared ACC Player of the Year honors with Wake Forest's Jennifer Kupcho, and was named both ACC and WGCA Freshman of the Year. During her year and a half at Florida State, Kinhult was a three-time winner and won the 2019 Arnold Palmer Cup.

In June 2019, she reached number one in the World Amateur Golf Ranking.

== Professional career ==
Kinhult turned professional in December 2019 after qualifying for the Symetra Tour. She won her first professional tournament at the 2020 Symetra Tour Championship, earning LPGA Tour membership for 2021 and a spot in the postponed 2020 U.S. Women's Open in the process. She was runner-up at the 2022 Florida's Natural Charity Classic.

Kinhult earned her card for the 2022 LPGA Tour through qualifying school. She finished in the top-100 of the rankings in 2022, 2023 and 2024, but had to go back to Q-School to keep her card for 2026 after falling to 136th.

In 2024, she tied for 3rd at the Ford Championship, 3 strokes behind winner Nelly Korda, and rose to a world rank of 107th a few weeks later.

== Personal life ==
She’s currently in relationship with fellow Swedish golfer, Vincent Norrman. The pair got engaged in 2025.

== Amateur wins ==
- 2017 Spanish International Ladies Amateur Championship
- 2018 Spanish International Ladies Amateur Championship, Jim West Challenge
- 2019 Darius Rucker Intercollegiate, Schooner Fall Classic

== Professional wins ==
=== Symetra Tour wins ===
No.	Date	Tournament	Winning score	To par	Margin of victory	Runner-up
1	6 Nov 2020	Symetra Tour Championship	68-71-69-70=278	−10	4 strokes	(United States) Demi Runas

== Results in LPGA majors ==
Results not in chronological order.

Tournament	2018	2019	2020	2021	2022	2023	2024	2025	2026
Chevron Championship		CUT				CUT		T76	CUT
U.S. Women's Open			CUT		T24				
Women's PGA Championship					CUT	CUT	69	CUT	CUT
The Evian Championship			NT		CUT	CUT	CUT		CUT
Women's British Open	CUT	CUT							

Did not play

CUT = missed the half-way cut
NT = no tournament
T = tied

=== Summary ===
Tournament	Wins	2nd	3rd	Top-5	Top-10	Top-25	Events	Cuts made
Chevron Championship	0	0	0	0	0	0	4	1
U.S. Women's Open	0	0	0	0	0	1	2	1
Women's PGA Championship	0	0	0	0	0	0	5	1
The Evian Championship	0	0	0	0	0	0	4	0
Women's British Open	0	0	0	0	0	0	2	0
Totals	0	0	0	0	0	1	17	3

- Most consecutive cuts made – 1 (three times)

== Team appearances ==
Amateur

- Junior Vagliano Trophy: (representing the Continent of Europe): 2015 (winners)
- Patsy Hankins Trophy (representing Europe): 2016, 2018
- Junior Ryder Cup (representing Europe): 2016
- Junior Solheim Cup (representing Europe): 2017
- Vagliano Trophy (representing the Continent of Europe): 2019 (winners)
- European Girls' Team Championship (representing Sweden): 2015, 2016, 2017 (winners), 2018
- Espirito Santo Trophy (representing Sweden): 2018
- European Ladies' Team Championship (representing Sweden): 2018 (winners), 2019 (winners)
- Arnold Palmer Cup (representing the International team): 2019 (winners)
