= Paula Martín Sampedro =

Spanish golfer (born 2005)

Personal information
- Nationality: Spain
- Born: 2 September 2005 (age 21) Madrid, Spain
- Height: 5 ft 3 in (160 cm)

Career
- Sport: Golf
- College: Stanford University
- Status: Amateur

Best results in LPGA major championships
- Chevron Championship: T59: 2026
- Women's PGA C'ship: DNP
- U.S. Women's Open: CUT: 2025, 2026
- Women's British Open: T8: 2025
- Evian Championship: DNP

Achievements and awards
- WGCA Freshman of the Year: 2024
- Pac-12 Freshman of the Year: 2024
- Pac-12 Golfer of the Year: 2024

Paula Martín Sampedro (born 2 September 2005) is a Spanish amateur golfer and Stanford Cardinal player. She won the 2022 Junior Golf World Cup, 2022 World Junior Girls Golf Championship, the 2024 NCAA Team Championship, 2025 Women's Amateur Championship, and 2025 European Ladies Amateur Championship. She became the top-ranked amateur golfer in the World Amateur Golf Ranking in August 2026.

== Amateur career ==
In 2021, Martín won the Spanish International Stroke Play Championship and was runner-up at the Spanish U16 Championship, Spanish U18 Championship and the French International Ladies Championship, behind Elena Moosmann.

In 2022, Martín lost the final of the Internationaux de France U21 – Trophée Esmond to Amalie Leth-Nissen, and was runner-up at the European Nations Cup - Copa Sotogrande. She also made two Ladies European Tour starts, and tied for 16th at the Madrid Ladies Open and 19th at the Andalucia Costa Del Sol Open De España, the LET season finale.

Martín finished third at the 2023 Portuguese International Ladies Amateur Championship, a stroke behind Rocío Tejedo and Cayetana Fernández García-Poggio. She qualified for the 2025 U.S. Women's Open at The Olympic Club.

Martín had success with the National Team. She played on the winning Spanish team at the European Ladies' Team Championship twice. In 2022, she won the Junior Golf World Cup and World Junior Girls Golf Championship with Andrea Revuelta and Cayetana Fernández, and finished 5th with the team and 7th individually at the 2022 Espirito Santo Trophy. She had the second best individual score at the 2024 European Ladies' Team Championship.

At the 2025 AIG Women's Open, Martín started the final round in 36th place at even. After shooting a 38 on the front nine, she was at +2 for the championship. However, Martín shot a 30 on the back nine with 6 birdies to finish the tournament at −4 in a three-way tie for 8th place, easily winning low amateur honors. Additionally, with the top-10 finish, Martín will automatically qualify for the 2026 AIG Women's Open.

== Collegiate career ==
Martín enrolled at Stanford University in 2023. Playing with the Stanford Cardinal women's golf team, she was named WGCA First Team All-American, WGCA Freshman of the Year, and Pac-12 Freshman of the Year and Pac-12 Golfer of the Year.

Martín won the 2024 NCAA Championship with Stanford and finished third individually, behind Adéla Cernousek and Lottie Woad. She finished fourth individually at the 2025 NCAA Championship, as Stanford lost the final to Northwestern.

== Amateur wins ==
- 2021 Puntuable Nacional Cadete Femenino, Spanish International Stroke Play Championship
- 2022 Campeonato de Espana Amateur IV Memorial Emma Villacieros
- 2024 The Molly Collegiate Invitational
- 2025 Juli Inkster Meadow Club Collegiate, Women's Amateur Championship, European Ladies Amateur Championship
- 2026 Bruin Wave Invitational, ACC Women's Golf Championship

== Results in LPGA majors ==
Tournament	2025	2026
Chevron Championship		T59
U.S. Women's Open	CUT	CUT
Women's PGA Championship		
The Evian Championship		
Women's British Open	T8LA	T29LA

Top 10
Did not play

CUT = missed the half-way cut
T = tied

== Team appearances ==
Amateur

- European Young Masters (representing Spain): 2021
- European Girls' Team Championship (representing Spain): 2021 (winners), 2022, 2023 (winners)
- World Junior Girls Golf Championship (representing Spain): 2022 (winners)
- Junior Golf World Cup (representing Spain): 2022 (winners)
- Espirito Santo Trophy (representing Spain): 2022, 2025
- European Ladies' Team Championship (representing Spain): 2024, 2025 (winners), 2026 (winners)
- Arnold Palmer Cup (representing International team): 2024, 2025 (winners), 2026 (winners)
- Vagliano Trophy (representing the Continent of Europe): 2025
