= Carolina Chacarra =

Spanish golfer (born 2003)

Personal information
- Full name: Carolina López-Chacarra Coto
- Nationality: Spain
- Born: 16 April 2003 (age 23) Madrid, Spain
- Height: 174 cm (5 ft 9 in)

Career
- Sport: Golf
- College: Wake Forest University
- Turned professional: 2025
- Current tours: LPGA Tour (joined 2026); Ladies European Tour (joined 2026)
- Professional wins: 1

Number of wins by tour
- Ladies European Tour: 1

Best results in LPGA major championships
- Chevron Championship: DNP
- Women's PGA C'ship: T64: 2026
- U.S. Women's Open: T36: 2025
- Women's British Open: CUT: 2026
- Evian Championship: DNP

Achievements and awards
- ACC Freshman of the Year: 2022
- Inkster Award: 2025
Medal record
FISU World University Championships
Gold medal – first place	2023 Torino	Team
Silver medal – second place	2023 Torino	Individual

Carolina López-Chacarra Coto (born 16 April 2003) is a Spanish professional golfer and LPGA Tour player. As an amateur she won the 2019 Junior Vagliano Trophy, the 2022 Arnold Palmer Cup, the 2023 World University Golf Championships, 2023 European Ladies' Team Championship, and the 2023 NCAA Division I Women's Golf Championship.

== Early life ==
Chacarra was born in Madrid and comes from a golfing family; her older brother Eugenio Chacarra is a European Tour player. Their home course is Golf La Moraleja, and their respective first collegiate wins came within three days of each other.

== Amateur career ==
In 2020, she was runner-up at the Portuguese Ladies Amateur behind Alessia Nobilio and semi-finalist at the Spanish Ladies Amateur. She was runner-up at the 2022 World University Golf Championships in Italy behind Carla Tejedo Mulet. She made five consecutive appearances at the Augusta National Women's Amateur.

Chacarra had success with the National Team. She placed 5th at the 2022 Espirito Santo Trophy with Cayetana Fernández and Paula Martín Sampedro, and played on the winning Spanish team at the 2022 World University Golf Championships in Italy and the 2023 European Ladies' Team Championship in Finland.

She attended Wake Forest University between 2021 and 2025. Playing with the Wake Forest Demon Deacons women's golf team, she was named 2022 Atlantic Coast Conference Freshman of the Year and was a four-time All-American. As a sophomore in 2023, she helped Wake Forest win the NCAA Division I Women's Golf Championship title.

In her senior year, she was Annika Award finalist and received the Inkster Award as the top-ranked NCAA senior, earning her starts at the Meijer LPGA Classic and Portland Classic, plus automatic advance to second stage of LPGA Q-School.

== Professional career ==
Chacarra turned professional in 2025 ahead of securing her card for the 2026 LPGA Tour at Q-Series. She earned her card for the 2026 Ladies European Tour at Q-School.

== Amateur wins ==
- 2017 Campeonato Junior de Madrid
- 2018 Copa Federacion Vasca
- 2021 Campeonato de Madrid
- 2022 UCF Challenge, Darius Rucker Intercollegiate
- 2024 Jackson T. Stephens Cup
- 2025 NCAA Lubbock Regional

== Professional wins (1) ==
=== Ladies European Tour wins (1) ===
No.	Date	Tournament	Winning score	To par	Margin of victory	Runner-up
1	5 Jul 2026	Hulencourt Women's Open	70-65-73-68=276	−12	3 strokes	(Australia) Kelsey Bennett

== Results in LPGA majors ==
Tournament	2025	2026
Chevron Championship		
U.S. Women's Open	T36	
Women's PGA Championship		T64
The Evian Championship		
Women's British Open		CUT

Did not play

T = tied

== Team appearances ==
Amateur

- Junior Vagliano Trophy (representing Europe): 2019 (winners)
- European Young Masters (representing Spain): 2019
- World Junior Girls Championship (representing Spain): 2019
- European Girls' Team Championship (representing Spain): 2019, 2020
- European Ladies' Team Championship (representing Spain): 2020, 2021, 2022, 2023 (winners), 2025
- Spirit International Amateur (representing Spain): 2021
- Espirito Santo Trophy (representing Spain): 2022, 2025
- Arnold Palmer Cup (representing International team): 2022 (winners), 2025 (winners)
- Patsy Hankins Trophy (representing Europe): 2025
- Vagliano Trophy (representing Europe): 2025
