= Valentine Delon =

French golfer (born 2004)

Personal information
- Nationality: France
- Born: 2004 (age 21–22) Paris, France
- Height: 5 ft 7 in (170 cm)

Career
- Sport: Golf
- College: Virginia Tech
- Status: Amateur

Best results in LPGA major championships
- Chevron Championship: DNP
- Women's PGA C'ship: DNP
- U.S. Women's Open: DNP
- Women's British Open: CUT: 2026
- Evian Championship: DNP

Valentine Delon (born 2004) is a French amateur golfer. She won the 2026 Women's Amateur Championship at Muirfield.

== Early life and education ==
Delon was born in Paris, where her father Antoine has served as the captain of the French men's national golf team.

After graduating from Diagonale Paris, she enrolled at Virginia Tech in 2023. Playing with the Virginia Tech Hokies women's golf team, she led the team in scoring as a junior with 71.67 and was named to the All-ACC Academic Team.

== Amateur career ==
Delon won the 2024 Coupe Gaveau at Golf de Saint-Cloud to become French Champion, and made her maiden Ladies European Tour start at the 2025 Jabra Ladies Open, where she tied for 10th.

In 2026, Delon won The Women's Amateur Championship, defeating Spain's Andrea Revuelta, 3 and 1, in the 36-hole final at Muirfield Golf Club in Scotland.

Playing for the French women's national golf team, she collected three consecutive silver medals at the European Ladies' Team Championship in 2024, 2025 and 2026. She declined her invitation to the 2026 Evian Championship to participate in the 2026 European Ladies' Team Championship.

== Results in LPGA majors ==
Tournament	2026
Chevron Championship	
U.S. Women's Open	
Women's PGA Championship	
The Evian Championship	
Women's British Open	CUT

Did not play

CUT = missed the half-way cut
T = tied

== Amateur wins ==
- 2022 Grand Prix de Moliets, Coupe Cachard, Classic De Joyenval
- 2024 Championnat de France Dames (Coupe Gaveau)
- 2025 UNCG/AGPC Invitational
- 2026 The Women's Amateur Championship

== Team appearances ==
Amateur

- European Girls' Team Championship (representing France): 2023
- European Ladies' Team Championship (representing France): 2024, 2025, 2026
- Espirito Santo Trophy (representing France): 2025
- Vagliano Trophy (representing the Continent of Europe): 2025
