= Elin Pudas Remler =

Swedish golfer (born 2004)

Personal information
- Nationality: Sweden
- Born: 11 August 2004 (age 22) Gothenburg, Sweden

Career
- Sport: Golf
- College: University of Kentucky; Florida State University
- Status: Amateur

Achievements and awards
- Gothenburg Junior Golfer of the Year: 2021

Elin Pudas Remler (born 11 August 2004) is a Swedish amateur golfer. She won the 2024 European Nations Cup – Copa Sotogrande and reached the semi-finals of The Women's Amateur Championship in 2023.

== Early life and amateur career ==
Remler was born in 2004 and grew up in the Gothenburg suburb of Lerum. She learned the game from her father at Öijared Golf Club, and later came to represent Delsjö Golf Club. She won multiple Teen Tour and unior Masters Invitational titles and was drafted to the national team, where she won silver at the 2022 European Girls' Team Championship alongside Meja Örtengren and Nora Sundberg.

In 2023, she tied for 3rd at Helen Holm Scottish Women's Open Championship at Royal Troon Golf Club. In The Women's Amateur Championship at Prince's Golf Club, Sandwich, she edged out Spaniard Andrea Revuelta in the last-16 at the 19th, and won the quarter-final 3&2 against Beth Coulter, before losing in the semi-final to American Annabelle Pancake. Remler finished 4th at the 2023 Capio Ögon Trophy, an LET Access Series event, 2 strokes away from joining the playoff won by Sofie Kibsgaard Nielsen.

In April 2024, she won the European Nations Cup – Copa Sotogrande individual title, 5 strokes ahead of compatriot Meja Örtengren in solo second. The Swedish team won by 17 strokes ahead of England in second.

== College career ==
Remler attended RIG Helsingborg Filbornaskolan 2020-24 where she shared coach, Hans Larsson, with Ludvig Åberg and practiced at Vasatorp Golf Club. She enrolled at the University of Kentucky in the fall of 2024 and played with the Kentucky Wildcats women's golf team. After a semester she transferred to the Florida State University and started playing with the Florida State Seminoles women's golf team.

== Amateur wins ==
- 2019 Hulta Junior Open, Teen Tour Future #5
- 2020 Slaget om Göteborg #3
- 2021 Carin Hjalmarsson Junior Open
- 2022 Delsjö Junior Open
- 2023 Svenska Juniortouren Elit #2, Delsjö Junior Open, Junior Masters Invitational Final
- 2024 European Nations Cup – Copa Sotogrande

== Team appearances ==
Amateur

- European Girls' Team Championship (representing Sweden): 2022
- European Nations Cup – Copa Sotogrande (representing Sweden): 2024 (winners)
- European Ladies' Team Championship (representing Sweden): 2024, 2025
