= Elice Fredriksson =

Swedish professional golfer (born 2003)

Personal information
- Full name: Elice Johanna Wilhelmina Fredriksson
- Nationality: Sweden
- Born: 27 October 2003 (age 23) Halmstad, Sweden

Career
- Sport: Golf
- Turned professional: 2026
- Current tour: LET Access Series (joined 2026)
- Professional wins: 3

Achievements and awards
- Göran Zachrisson Award: 2023
- R&A Student Tour Series Order of Merit winner: 2024/25

Elice Fredriksson (born 27 October 2003) is a Swedish professional golfer. As an amateur, she won the 40th St Rule Trophy in 2024, and won the R&A Student Tour Series Final and Order of Merit in 2025, both at St Andrews, Scotland. She formed part of the winning teams at the 2025 Arnold Palmer Cup and the 2026 European Nations Cup – Copa Sotogrande.

== Early life and amateur career ==
Fredriksson was born in 2003 in Halmstad, and represents Halmstad Golf Club.

Fredriksson received the 2023 Göran Zachrisson Award. In 2024 she became the fifth player from Sweden to win the St Rule Trophy at the St Andrews Links in Scotland, following Annika Sörenstam, Maria Hjorth, Karin Börjeskog and Louise Stahle.

In 2025, Fredriksson finished 5th at the Portuguese International Ladies Amateur Championship and helped her team to a 4th place at the 2025 European Ladies' Team Championship held at Golf de Chantilly near Paris.

She made her Ladies European Tour debut at the Hills Ladies Open, where she finished tied 23rd.

Fredriksson won the women's team event at the 2026 European Nations Cup – Copa Sotogrande with Ebba Lundqvist and Havanna Torstensson, five strokes ahead of England and France in tied second.

== College career ==
Fredriksson attended Halmstad University from 2022 to 2026 and competed on the R&A's Student Tour Series, where she won three events and recorded sixteen top-5 finishes.

In 2025 she won the series final at the Old Course at St Andrews and topped the season rankings. In 2026, she finished runner-up in the final, and narrowly missed out on the Order of Merit title.

She won the 2025 Arnold Palmer Cup with the international team at Congaree Golf Club in South Carolina.

== Professional career ==
Fredriksson turned professional in July 2026 and joined the LET Access Series. She tied for 5th in her first event, the CSK Steel Women's Open in Denmark, two strokes behind winner Moa Svedenskiöld.

== Amateur wins ==
- 2018 Teen Tour First #3 Halland, Äppelslaget - Slaget om Skåne
- 2020 Teen Tour Future #4 Västergötland, Tylösand Junior Open
- 2021 Slaget om Skåne - Elit #4
- 2022 Tylösand Junior Open, Haverdal Junior Open, Falkenberg Junior Open
- 2023 R&A Student Tour Series - Spain
- 2024 St Rule Trophy, Svenska Juniortouren Elit #5
- 2025 R&A Student Tour Series Final, R&A Student Tour Series - Sweden

== Professional wins (3) ==
=== Future Series (3) ===
- 2024 Septemberpokalen, Falkenberg Open
- 2025 Falkenberg Open

== Team appearances ==
Amateur

- Arnold Palmer Cup (representing the International team): 2025 (winners)
- European Ladies' Team Championship (representing Sweden): 2025
- European Nations Cup – Copa Sotogrande (representing Sweden): 2026 (winners)
