= St Rule Trophy =

Tournament information
- Location: St Andrews, Scotland
- Established: 1984
- Organised by: St Andrews Links Trust
- Format: Stroke play

Current champion
- (Republic of Ireland) Kate Lanigan

The St Rule Trophy is an international women's amateur golf tournament contested on the St Andrews Links in Scotland. It has been played annually since 1984. The format is 54-hole stroke play over two days. Since 2014, two rounds have been played on the New course on the first day and one round on the Old course on the final day.

Originally the event was contested over 36 holes of the Old course on a single day, a Saturday. The original trophy was stolen from the St Rule Club in 1986. The event was extended to 54 holes in 1989 when the men's St Andrews Links Trophy was founded. Initially the two events were played concurrently, the women playing one round on the New and Old courses on the opening day and a further round on the Old course on the second day. From 1993 the event was played on a different weekend to the St Andrews Links Trophy, with one round played on the New course on the first day and two rounds played on the Old course on the final day.

== Winners ==
Year	Winner	Score	Margin of victory	Runner(s)-up	Ref.
2026	(Republic of Ireland) Kate Lanigan	208	4 stroke	(Denmark) Anna Behnsen	
2025	(England) Davina Xanh	215	1 stroke	(England) Charlotte Naughton	
2024	(Sweden) Elice Fredriksson	211	2 strokes	(England) Charlotte Naughton	
2023	(England) Patience Rhodes	212	1 stroke	(France) Lois Lau (Sweden) Ebba Nordstedt	
2022	(Scotland) Jennifer Saxton	217	3 strokes	(Republic of Ireland) Beth Coulter (Scotland) Chloe Goadby (England) Lucy Jamieson (United States) Meghan Stasi	
2021	(Scotland) Hannah Darling	208	3 strokes	(Scotland) Clara Young	
2020	Cancelled due to COVID-19 pandemic in Scotland				
2019	(Scotland) Hazel MacGarvie	208	4 strokes	(England) Lianna Bailey	
2018	(England) Lianna Bailey	214	1 stroke	(England) Emily Brennan (Scotland) Hazel MacGarvie	
2017	(Scotland) Clara Young	210	1 stroke	(Australia) Montana Strauss	
2016	(France) Pauline Roussin-Bouchard	213	1 stroke	(France) Anais Meyssonnier	
2015	(India) Aditi Ashok	216	5 strokes	(England) Bethan Popel	
2014	(Scotland) Jessica Meek	213	Playoff (Note: Meek beat Carnet with a par on the third playoff hole.)	(France) Anaelle Carnet	
2013	(Scotland) Ailsa Summers	211	2 strokes	(France) Céline Boutier	
2012	(Scotland) Laura Murray	220	2 strokes	(England) Emma Goddard	
2011	(Australia) Ashley Ona	73 (Note: Event reduced to 18 holes because of strong wins.)	Countback (Note: Ona won on countback having scored 34 for the final 9 holes. The others scored 35, Elliott was placed second based on scores for the last 6 holes.)	(Australia) Breanna Elliott (Republic of Ireland) Leona Maguire (Sweden) Madelene Sagström	
2010	(Scotland) Laura Murray	221	Playoff (Note: Murray beat Boulden with a par on the second playoff hole. Keating was eliminated by pars at the first extra hole.)	(Wales) Amy Boulden (Australia) Stacey Keating	
2009	(Scotland) Kylie Walker	218	2 strokes	(Scotland) Carly Booth	
2008	(Scotland) Kylie Walker	148 (Note: Event contested over 36 holes.)	1 stroke	(France) Audrey Goumard	
2007	(England) Melissa Reid	209	8 strokes	(Germany) Denise Becker (England) Henrietta Brockway (Australia) Kate Coombes	
2006	(Scotland) Krystle Caithness	216	1 stroke	(Germany) Katharina Schallenberg	
2005	(England) Naomi Edwards	225	Playoff (Note: Edwards won with an eagle on the second playoff hole.)	(England) Felicity Johnson (Republic of Ireland) Heather Nolan	
2004	(Sweden) Louise Stahle	141	4 strokes	(Australia) Nikki Garret (United States) Annie Thurman	
2003	(Sweden) Karin Börjeskog	217	2 strokes	(Republic of Ireland) Martina Gillen (Scotland) Anne Laing	
2002	(Scotland) Heather Stirling	218	3 strokes	(Northern Ireland) Alison Coffey	
2001	(Northern Ireland) Alison Coffey	221	2 strokes	(England) Rebecca Hudson	
2000	(Scotland) Vikki Laing	153 (Note: Event reduced to 36 holes because of adverse weather.)	Playoff (Note: Laing beat Fisher on the second playoff hole.)	(England) Kirsty Fisher	
1999	(Scotland) Lesley Nicholson	227	2 strokes	(England) Kim Andrew (England) Rebecca Hudson	
1998	(Spain) Nuria Clau	154	2 strokes	(Republic of Ireland) Sinead Keane	
1997	(England) Kim Rostron	217	1 stroke	(Scotland) Janice Moodie	
1996	(Scotland) Anne Laing	227	1 stroke	(Republic of Ireland) Ada O'Sullivan	
1995	(Sweden) Maria Hjorth	220	2 strokes	(Sweden) Anna Berg (Scotland) Janice Moodie (Scotland) Alison Rose	
1994	(Scotland) Catriona Matthew	217	10 strokes	(Sweden) Anna Berg (Scotland) Sharon McMaster (Scotland) Alison Rose (England) Kirsty Speak	
1993	(Scotland) Catriona Lambert	215	2 strokes	(Scotland) Mhairi McKay	
1992	(Scotland) Morag Wright	222	1 stroke	(Sweden) Mia Bergman	
1991	(Scotland) Alison Rose	237	2 strokes	(England) Helen Wilson	
1990	(Sweden) Annika Sörenstam	228	Playoff (Note: Sörenstam beat Allmark on the first playoff hole.)	(Sweden) Jennifer Allmark	
1989	(Scotland) Christine Middleton	232	3 strokes	(Scotland) Julie Forbes (Scotland) Donna Jackson	
1988	(Scotland) Christine Middleton	152	1 stroke	(Scotland) Sharon Gallagher	
1987	(England) Joanne Morley	153	5 strokes	(Scotland) Fiona Farquharson	
1986	(England) Tracy Hammond	153	2 strokes	(Scotland) Mary Mackie	
1985	(Scotland) Kathryn Imrie	151	1 stroke	(Scotland) Pamela Wright	
1984	(United States) Penny Hammel	149	3 strokes	(Scotland) Wilma Aitken	

== See also ==
- St Andrews Links Trophy
