= Blanca Fernández (golfer) =

Spanish professional golfer (born 2001)

Personal information
- Full name: Blanca Fernández García-Poggio
- Nationality: Spain
- Born: 17 January 2001 (age 25) Madrid, Spain
- Height: 169 cm (5 ft 7 in)

Career
- Sport: Golf
- Turned professional: 2024
- Current tours: Ladies European Tour (joined 2025); Epson Tour (joined 2025)

Blanca Fernández García-Poggio (born 17 January 2001) is a Spanish professional golfer and Ladies European Tour player. As an amateur, she won the 2017 World Junior Girls Championship.

== Amateur career ==
Fernández was born in Madrid in 2002 and played for her national team. With Spain, she won the 2017 World Junior Girls Golf Championship in Canada and finished 3rd individually. She won silver at the 2018 European Girls' Team Championship in Sweden, and bronze at the 2022 European Ladies' Team Championship in Wales. She also represented Europe at the 2018 Patsy Hankins Trophy in Qatar, and Spain at the 2018 Summer Youth Olympics in Buenos Aires together with David Puig.

Fernández played college golf with the Texas A&M Aggies women's golf team 2019–2024, where she won twice and played in three NCAA Division I women's golf championships.

== Professional career ==
Fernández turned professional after graduating in mid-2024. She made her LET debut at the La Sella Open in Alicante, where she sat tied for fourth at the halfway mark and ultimately tied for 23rd. She earned a 2025 Epson Tour card at the LPGA Final Qualifying Tournament, missing out on a full LPGA Tour card by three strokes. She earned her card for the 2025 Ladies European Tour at Q-School where she tied for 6th.

== Personal life ==
Fernández has two sisters that are also accomplished golfers. Her younger sister Cayetana won the 2022 World Junior Girls Championship and started playing college golf with the Texas A&M Aggies women's golf team in 2023.

== Amateur wins ==
- 2016 Campeonato Junior de Madrid
- 2018 Spanish International Stroke Play Championship
- 2021 Campeonato Absoluto Individual Damas CCVM, Campeonato Junior Y U25 de Madrid, Sam Golden Invitational
- 2023 Remax Prime Properties Bearkat Invitational

== Team appearances ==
Amateur

- Junior Vagliano Trophy (representing Europe): 2017 (winners)
- European Girls' Team Championship (representing Spain): 2017, 2018
- World Junior Girls Championship (representing Spain): 2017, 2018
- Youth Olympic Games (representing Spain): 2018
- Patsy Hankins Trophy (representing Europe): 2018
- European Ladies' Team Championship (representing Spain): 2022
