= Adéla Cernousek =

French professional golfer (born 2003)

Personal information
- Nickname: Adé
- Nationality: France
- Born: 13 August 2003 (age 23) Antibes, France

Career
- Sport: Golf
- College: Texas A&M University
- Turned professional: 2024
- Current tour: LPGA Tour (joined 2025)
- Professional wins: 1

Best results in LPGA major championships
- Chevron Championship: DNP
- Women's PGA C'ship: DNP
- U.S. Women's Open: T67: 2024
- Women's British Open: DNP
- Evian Championship: CUT: 2024

Adéla Cernousek (born 13 August 2003) is a French professional golfer and LPGA Tour player. She was the individual winner of the 2024 NCAA Championship.

== Early life ==
Cernousek was born in Antibes near Nice, France to parents who were professional volleyball players. She later became attached to Golf de Saint-Cloud to the west of Paris.

== Amateur career ==
Cernousek represented the French National Team between 2017 and 2024. She won silver at the 2021 European Girls' Team Championship in Portugal, and played in the 2023 Espirito Santo Trophy in Abu Dhabi.

She enrolled at the Texas A&M University in 2021 to play with the Texas A&M Aggies women's golf team, where she broke several records. She had a 72.21 stroke average as a freshman, the second best by a freshman by in school history. As a junior, she had a scoring average of 69.94, the lowest in school history and the first under 71 by a woman.

In May 2024, Cernousek won the individual competition at the NCAA Division I women's golf championship, three strokes ahead of Lottie Woad.

She won a U.S. Open qualifier in Texas with a score of six-under-par to make her major debut at the 2024 U.S. Women's Open, where she sat in joint second place after the first round, and ultimately finished tied 67th.

Cernousek made it to the quarterfinals of the 2024 U.S. Women's Amateur, where she lost to Asterisk Talley 1 down. She reached a career high of 7th in the World Amateur Golf Ranking.

== Professional career ==
Cernousek turned professional in 2024. In December 2024, Cernousek earned her LPGA Tour card for 2025 by finishing T-13 at the LPGA Final Qualifying Tournament. In an early stage of qualifying, she shared medalist honors with Mimi Rhodes.

== Amateur wins ==
- 2017 Grand Prix du Golf d'Aix en Provence
- 2018 Evian Junior Event Girls
- 2019 Coupe Didier Illouz
- 2020 Championnat de France Cadets
- 2024 NCAA Championship

== Professional wins (1) ==
=== Other wins (1) ===
- 2021 Open des Aisses (as an amateur)

== Results in LPGA majors ==
| Tournament | 2024 |
|---|---|
| Chevron Championship | |
| U.S. Women's Open | T67 |
| Women's PGA Championship | |
| The Evian Championship | CUT |
| Women's British Open | |

Did not play

CUT = missed the half-way cut
T = tied

== Team appearances ==
Amateur

- Junior Golf World Cup (representing France): 2017
- European Girls' Team Championship (representing France): 2018, 2019, 2021
- World Junior Girls Championship (representing France): 2019
- Spirit International (representing France): 2021, 2024
- Espirito Santo Trophy (representing France): 2023
- European Ladies' Team Championship (representing France): 2023
- Arnold Palmer Cup (representing the International team): 2024
