= Patience Rhodes =

English golfer (born 2004)

Personal information
- Nationality: England
- Born: 3 January 2004 (age 22) Bath, Somerset, England

Career
- Sport: Golf
- College: Arizona State University
- Status: Amateur

Patience Rhodes (born 3 January 2004) is an English amateur golfer and Arizona State Sun Devils player. She won the 2023 St Rule Trophy, the 2024 Spirit International Amateur, and the 2025 Vagliano Trophy.

== Early life ==
Rhodes was born in Bath, Somerset, England, and raised in Sotogrande, Spain. She was introduced to golf by her grandmother, a single-figure handicap golfer. Her sister Mimi is also an accomplished golfer, and a Ladies European Tour player. Patience was educated at Kingswood School.

== Amateur career ==
Rhodes won the 2021 English Girls' Open Amateur Stroke Play Championship, and in 2023 she won the St Rule Trophy at St Andrews Links in Scotland, and reached the round of 32 in the Women's Amateur Championship in England.

In 2022, Rhodes enrolled at Arizona State University, but didn't start playing with the Arizona State Sun Devils women's golf team until 2023 after picking up wrist and back injuries. In 2025, she was a candidate for National Golfer of the Year and competed at the Augusta National Women's Amateur.

With team England, she earned silver at the 2023 European Ladies' Team Championship in Finland and, alongside her sister, bronze at the same tournament the following year in Spain. She won the 2024 Curtis Cup at Sunningdale Golf Club, where she defeated world number four Zoe Campos of the United States in singles, 6 and 5.

In 2024, she won the Spirit International Amateur in Texas with the English team.

== Amateur wins ==
- 2019 FinnishGolf.com Open
- 2020 Memorial Norberto Goizueta
- 2021 English Girls' Open Amateur Stroke Play Championship
- 2023 St Rule Trophy

== Team appearances ==
Amateur

- Junior Vagliano Trophy (representing Great Britain & Ireland): 2019
- European Young Masters (representing England): 2019
- Girls and Boys Home Internationals (representing England): 2021 (winners)
- European Girls' Team Championship (representing England): 2022
- Women's and Men's Home Internationals (representing England): 2023 (winners), 2024, 2025
- European Ladies' Team Championship (representing England): 2023, 2024, 2025, 2026
- Patsy Hankins Trophy (representing Europe): 2023 (winners), 2025
- Curtis Cup (representing the Great Britain & Ireland): 2024 (winners), 2026
- Spirit International Amateur (representing England): 2024 (winners)
- Vagliano Trophy (representing Great Britain & Ireland): 2025 (winners)
- Espirito Santo Trophy (representing England): 2025
- Arnold Palmer Cup (representing the International team): 2026 (winners)
