= European Nations Cup – Copa Sotogrande =

Tournament information
- Location: Sotogrande, Spain
- Established: 1970
- Course: Real Club de Golf Sotogrande
- Par: 72
- Length: 6,492 m (men); 5,382 m (women)
- Organised by: Real Club de Golf Sotogrande
- Format: Stroke play
- Month played: April

Current champion
- (England) Eliot Baker (men) (Sweden) Havanna Torstensson (women)

The European Nations Cup – Copa Sotogrande is an annual amateur golf tournament held at Real Club de Golf Sotogrande in Spain.

The tournament is a stroke play event held over 72 holes. In 1970, Brandy de Jerez Regulatory Council started to sponsor of the tournament, and it became known as the Sherry Cup. The champions were presented with the Gold Sherry Wine Trophy and a yellow Amateur Masters Jacket. Typically attracting a strong field from the British Isles, sometimes it is considered the fifth most prestigious amateur event in Europe after the British Amateur, the European Amateur, European Amateur Team Championship and the Spanish Amateur.

In 1998, a team element was introduced, where the three best scores each day count towards a European Nations Championship. If the championship ends in a tie, a sudden-death play-off is held with one player per team.

Past champions include major winners such as Pádraig Harrington, Sergio García, Francesco Molinari, Rory McIlroy and Shane Lowry. Veit Pagel and Gary Wolstenholme has won the event a record four times.

== Men's winners ==
Year	Champion	Runner(s)-up	Nations Cup winners	Ref.
European Nations Cup – Copa Sotogrande
2026	(England) Eliot Baker	(Netherlands) Scott Woltering	England Eliot Baker; Kris Kim; Ben Bolton; Tom Osborne	
2025	(Estonia) Kevin Jegers	(England) Harley Smith	England Harley Smith; Daniel Hayes; Eliot Baker; Tom Osborne	
2024	(Wales) James Ashfield	(Scotland) Gregor Graham	Ireland Jack Hearn; Sean Keeling; Mathew McClean; Hugh Foley	
2023	(Sweden) Albert Hansson	(England) John Gough	England Josh Berry; Arron Edwards-Hill; John Gough; Dylan Shaw-Radford	
2022	(Spain) Jaime Montojo	(Spain) Luis Masaveu	Spain Jaime Montojo; Luis Masaveu; Alejandro Aguilera; Ángel Ayora	
2021	Cancelled			
2020	Cancelled			
2019	(England) Tom Sloman	(Spain) Victor Pastor Rufian (Germany) Jannik de Bruyn	England Bailey Gill; Ben Jones; Thomas Plumb; Tom Sloman	
2018	(England) Todd Clements	(Republic of Ireland) Alex Gleeson (Denmark) Rasmus Neergaard-Petersen (England) Gian-Marco Petrozzi	England David Hague; Gian-Marco Petrozzi; Todd Clements; Matthew Jordan	
2017	(Wales) Jack Davidson	(Republic of Ireland) Robin Dawson	Wales Josh Davies; David Boote; Jack Davidson; Owen Edwards	
2016	(Republic of Ireland) Jack Hume	(France) Romain Langasque (Wales) Owen Edwards	Ireland Stuart Grehan; Alex Gleeson; Jack Hume; Dermot McElroy	
2015	(Spain) Mario Galiano	(Netherlands) Robbie van West	England Ashley Chesters; Ben Stow; Nick Marsh; Paul Howard	
2014	(Italy) Guido Migliozzi	(Spain) Mario Galiano (Scotland) Bradley Neil	Scotland Bradley Neil; Jack McDonald; Scott Borrowman; Graeme Robertson	
2013	(France) Adrien Saddier	(Germany) Maximilian Roehrig	England Toby Tree; Max Orrin; Garrick Porteous; Nathan Kimsey	
2012	(Netherlands) Robin Kind	(Spain) Jon Rahm (Norway) Kristoffer Ventura	France Édouard España; Kenny Subregis; Adrien Saddier; Mathieu Decottignies-Lafon	
2011	(France) Julien Brun	(Austria) Lukas Nemecz	England Laurie Canter; Andy Sullivan; Jack Senior; Tom Lewis	
2010	(Italy) Nino Bertasio	(England) Tommy Fleetwood	England Tommy Fleetwood; Matt Haines; Chris Paisley; Tom Lewis	
2009	(England) Sam Hutsby	(Spain) Carlos Pigem	England Sam Hutsby; Luke Goddard; Charlie Ford; Dale Whitnell	
2008	(Republic of Ireland) Shane Lowry	(France) Benjamin Hébert	Scotland	
European Nations Cup – Grey Goose Cup
2007	(Northern Ireland) Rory McIlroy	(Norway) Marius Thorp	Denmark	
European Nations Cup – Sherry Cup
2006	(Wales) Nigel Edwards		Spain	
2005	(England) Gary Wolstenholme		Spain	
2004	(Italy) Francesco Molinari		England	
2003	(England) Gary Wolstenholme		England	
2002	(Wales) Lee Harpin		Wales	
2001	(England) Gary Wolstenholme		England	
2000	(England) Gary Wolstenholme		England	
1999	(Germany) Marcel Siem		Germany	
1998	(Spain) Sergio García		Spain	
Sherry Cup
1997	(Spain) Sergio García			
1996	(Spain) Álvaro Salto			
1995	(Spain) José María Zamora			
1994	(Spain) Francisco Cea			
1993	(Spain) Francisco Valera			
1992	(France) Frederic Cupillar			
1991	(Republic of Ireland) Pádraig Harrington			
1990	(Spain) Alvaro Prat			
1989	(Spain) Diego Borrego			
1988	(Spain) Yago Beamonte			
1987	(Spain) Yago Beamonte			
1986	(Spain) Borja Queipo de Llano			
1985	(Spain) José L. Padila			
1984	(England) John Marks			
1983	(Spain) José L. de Bernardo			
1982	(Spain) Borja Queipo de Llano			
1981	(Germany) Veit Pagel			
1980	(Spain) Jesús López			
1979	(Germany) Veit Pagel			
1978	(Spain) José L. de Bernardo			
1977	(Spain) F. Jiménez			
1976	(Italy) Alberto Croze			
1975	(Germany) Veit Pagel			
1974	(Germany) Veit Pagel			
1973	(Italy) Alberto Croze			
1972	(Spain) E. de la Riva & J. Gancedo			
1971	(Italy) Alberto Croze			
1970	(England) Henric Adam			

=== Nations Cup results ===
Country	Wins
England	14
Spain	4
Scotland	2
Wales	2
Ireland	2
Denmark	1
France	1
Germany	1
Total	27

== Women's winners ==
Year	Champion	Runner(s)-up	Nations Cup winners	Ref
European Nations Cup – Copa Sotogrande
2026	(Sweden) Havanna Torstensson	(France) Giselle Zhao	Sweden Ebba Lundqvist; Elice Fredriksson; Havanna Torstensson	
2025	(Denmark) Benedicte Brent-Buchholz	(Netherlands) Rosanne Boere	Sweden Moa Stridh; Ebba Lundqvist; Matilda Björkman Spain Nagore Martínez; Lucia Iraola Paniagua; Amanda Revuelta	
2024	(Sweden) Elin Pudas Remler	(Sweden) Meja Örtengren	Sweden Elin Pudas Remler; Meja Örtengren; Nora Sundberg	
2023	(Spain) Rocío Tejedo	(Finland) Katri Bakker	Spain Rocío Tejedo; Andrea Revuelta; Anna Cañadó	
2022	(Germany) Helen Briem	(Spain) Paula Martín Sampedro	Germany Helen Briem; Charlotte Back; Emily Krause	
2021	Cancelled			
2020	Cancelled			
2019	(Spain) Marta Llorca García	(Switzerland) Elena Moosmann (Belgium) Clarisse Louis	Netherlands Romy Meekers; Zhen Bontan; Lauren Holmey France Mathilde Claisse; Gala Dumez; Lucie Malchirand	
2018	(Denmark) Sofie Kibsgaard Nielsen	(France) Candice Mahe		
2017	(France) Chloe Salort	(Denmark) Puk Lyng Thomsen		
2016	(Austria) Emma Spitz	(Spain) María Parra		
2015	(Netherlands) Dewi Weber	(Spain) Natalia Escuriola		
2014	(Denmark) Nanna Koerstz Madsen	(Switzerland) Albane Valenzuela	France	
2013	(Spain) Patricia Sanz	(Wales) Chloe Williams		
2012	(France) Céline Boutier	(Denmark) Nicole Broch Larsen		
2011	(Spain) Camilla Hedberg	(Germany) Lara Katzy		
2010	(Spain) Mireia Prat	(Finland) Linda Henriksson (Czech Republic) Klára Spilková		
2009	(Netherlands) Marieke Nivard	(France) Marion Ricordeau		
2008	(Spain) Carlota Ciganda	(Sweden) Caroline Hedwall		
