= Savannah De Bock =

Belgian golfer

Personal information
- Nationality: Belgium
- Born: 20 October 2005 (age 21) Tournai, Belgium
- Height: 5 ft 3 in (1.60 m)

Career
- Sport: Golf
- College: University of Georgia; Eastern Michigan University
- Status: Amateur

Best results in LPGA major championships
- Chevron Championship: DNP
- Women's PGA C'ship: DNP
- U.S. Women's Open: DNP
- Women's British Open: CUT: 2022, 2023
- Evian Championship: DNP

Savannah De Bock (born 20 October 2005) is an amateur golfer from Belgium. She won the 2022 European Ladies Amateur and the Junior Solheim Cup with Europe in 2021 and 2023.

== Amateur career ==
De Bock has enjoyed a successful amateur career. She won her first international championship, the 2017 Orange Bowl Doral-Publix Junior Golf Classic in Miami, when she was only 12. In 2018 and 2019, she was runner-up at the Belgian National Juniors Championship, and won the event in 2021. In 2020, she was runner-up at the CJGA World Junior Challenge, run by the Canadian Junior Golf Association, behind Chloe Chan of Hong Kong.

In 2021, she was runner-up at the European Young Masters in Finland, 2 strokes behind Helen Briem. She won the Belgian International Amateur Championship & National Stroke Play Championship back-to-back in 2021 and 2022.

In 2022, only 16 years old, she triumphed at the European Ladies Amateur, winning in a playoff against Charlotte Heath of England, becoming just the second Belgian to win the title after Florence Descampe in 1988. The win earned her a place in the field at the 2022 Women's British Open, where she did not make the cut. She finished tied 14th and low amateur at The Mithra Belgian Ladies Open on the Ladies European Tour.

In 2023, she was runner-up at the Junior Orange Bowl International behind Anna Davis, and again at the Spanish International Ladies Amateur Championship losing 2 & 1 to Nora Sundberg of Sweden. She accepted a golf scholarship to the University of Georgia and started playing with the Georgia Bulldogs women's golf team in the spring of 2024 and was named to the SEC's All-Freshman team. She transferred to Eastern Michigan University in 2024.

== Amateur wins ==
- 2017 Orange Bowl Doral-Publix Junior Golf Classic (U-13), Belgian National Juniors Championship (U-12)
- 2018 Rigenee Junior Open, Grand Prix Adult Mormal
- 2019 Omnium Classic of Belgium, Thomas Pieters Open
- 2020 Rigenee Junior Open
- 2021 Belgian International Amateur Championship & National Stroke Play Championship, Belgian National Juniors Championship
- 2022 King's Prize, Belgian International Amateur Championship & National Stroke Play Championship, European Ladies Amateur
- 2024 Red Sky Classic
- 2026 Citrus Golf Trail Ladies Invitational, Leadership And Golf Invitational

== Team appearances ==
Amateur

- Holland-Belgium: 2016, 2017
- European Young Masters (representing Belgium): 2018, 2019, 2020, 2021
- European Girls' Team Championship (representing Belgium): 2019, 2020, 2021, 2022, 2023
- Junior Solheim Cup (representing Europe): 2021 (winners), 2023 (winners)
- Espirito Santo Trophy (representing Belgium): 2022, 2023, 2025
- World Junior Girls Championship (representing Belgium): 2022, 2023
- Vagliano Trophy (representing Europe): 2023 (winners)
- Patsy Hankins Trophy (representing Europe): 2023 (winners)
- European Ladies' Team Championship (representing Belgium): 2024, 2025
