= Patsy Hankins Trophy =

Women's amateur golf competition

The Patsy Hankins Trophy is a women's amateur golf competition on the model of the Ryder Cup, corresponding to the men's Bonallack Trophy. The competition opposes every two years a European team and a team representing Asia/Pacific, and the venue alternates between courses in Europe and Asia/Pacific.

The Trophy is named after Patsy Hankins (1945–2015), one of the most respected golf administrators New Zealand has produced. The first competition took place in 2016 at Vidago Palace Golf Course, Portugal.

== Format ==
The Patsy Hankins Trophy involves various match play competitions between players selected from two teams of twelve representing Europe and Asia-Pacific. It takes place over three days, with a total of 32 matches being played, all matches being over 18 holes. The first two days comprise five foursomes matches and five four-ball matches. On the final day, there are 12 singles matches, when all twelve players compete.

The winner of each match scores a point for his team, with a half point each for any match that is tied after the 18 holes. The winning team is determined by cumulative total points. In the event of a tie (16 points each) the Patsy Hankins Trophy is retained by the previous holder.

A foursomes match is a competition between two teams of two golfers. On a particular hole the golfers on the same team take alternate shots playing the same ball. One team member tees off on all the odd-numbered holes, and the other on all the even-numbered holes. Each hole is won by the team that completes the hole in the fewest shots. A fourball match is also a competition between two teams of two golfers, but all four golfers play their own ball throughout the round rather than alternating shots. The better score of the two golfers in a team determines the team's score on a particular hole; the score of the other member of the team is not counted. Each hole is won by the team whose individual golfer has the lowest score. A singles match is a standard match play competition between two golfers.

Year	Day 1		Day 2		Day 3	Total points
Year	Morning	Afternoon	Morning	Afternoon	Day 3	Total points
2016	5 foursomes	5 fourballs	5 foursomes	5 fourballs	12 singles	32
2018–	5 fourballs	5 foursomes	5 fourballs	5 foursomes	12 singles	32

== Team qualification and selection ==
=== European Team selection ===
The World Amateur Golf Rankings are used as the main reference for the selection process, in addition to a small number of players selected by the captain (known as "captain's picks"). No more than two players may be selected from the same country.

== Results ==
Year	Winners	Score		Losers	Host country	Venue	Europe captain	Asia/Pacific captain
2025	Asia/Pacific	20	12	Europe	United Arab Emirates	Al Hamra Golf Club	(Netherlands) Myrte Eikenaar	(Hong Kong) Joanne McKee
2023	Europe	19	13	Asia/Pacific	Spain (Note: The 2023 edition hosted by Spain was originally scheduled for 2020)	La Manga Club	(Netherlands) Myrte Eikenaar	(New Zealand) Liz McKinnon
2018	Asia/Pacific	23½	8½	Europe	Qatar	Doha Golf Club	(England) Elaine Ratcliffe	(Hong Kong) Joanne McKee
2016	Asia/Pacific	17	15	Europe	Portugal	Vidago Palace GC	(England) Elaine Ratcliffe	(New Zealand) Libby Steele

== Appearances ==
The following are those who have played in at least one of the matches.

=== Europe ===
- 2016
  - (Switzerland) Gioia Carpinelli
  - (Italy) Lucrezia Colombotto Rosso
  - (Italy) Bianca Fabrizio
  - (Germany) Laura Fünfstück
  - (Sweden) Frida Kinhult
  - (England) Meghan MacLaren
  - (Spain) María Parra Luque
  - (Spain) Luna Sobrón Galmés
  - (Austria) Emma Spitz
  - (Denmark) Puk Lyng Thomsen
  - (Switzerland) Albane Valenzuela
  - (Wales) Chloe Williams
- 2018
  - (Iceland) Gudrun Bjorgvinsdottir
  - (Netherlands) Zhen Bontan
  - (Italy) Bianca Fabrizio
  - (Spain) Blanca Fernández García-Poggio
  - (England) Annabell Fuller
  - (Republic of Ireland) Paula Grant
  - (Sweden) Frida Kinhult
  - (Sweden) Amanda Linnér
  - (Belgium) Clarisse Louis
  - (Switzerland) Elena Moosmann
  - (Denmark) Puk Lyng Thomsen
  - (England) Isobel Wardle
- 2023
  - (Sweden) Kajsa Arwefjäll
  - (Germany) Helen Briem
  - (Republic of Ireland) Beth Coulter
  - (Belgium) Savannah De Bock
  - (Spain) Cayetana Fernández García-Poggio
  - (Italy) Francesca Fiorellini
  - (Czech Republic) Patricie Macková
  - (Sweden) Meja Örtengren
  - (England) Patience Rhodes
  - (Germany) Celina Rosa Sattelkau
  - (Spain) Rocío Tejedo
  - (England) Lottie Woad
- 2025
  - (Denmark) Emma Bunch
  - (Republic of Ireland) Beth Coulter
  - (Republic of Ireland) Aine Donegan
  - (Italy) Francesca Fiorellini
  - (Spain) Carolina López-Chacarra
  - (Denmark) Marie Eline Madsen
  - (Italy) Carolina Melgrati
  - (England) Patience Rhodes
  - (Sweden) Louise Rydqvist
  - (Sweden) Nora Sundberg
  - (Spain) Rocío Tejedo
  - (England) Lottie Woad

=== Asia/Pacific ===
- 2016
  - (New Zealand) Julianne Alvarez
  - (Japan) Hina Aragaki
  - (Hong Kong) Tiffany Chan
  - (South Korea) Choi Hye-jin
  - (Australia) Hannah Green
  - (Japan) Nasa Hataoka
  - (New Zealand) Wenyung Keh
  - (South Korea) Park Hyun-kyung
  - (China) Tian Qi
  - (Philippines) Princess Mary Superal
  - (Thailand) Patty Tavatanakit
  - (Chinese Taipei) Han-Hsuan Yu
- 2018
  - (Chinese Taipei) Ya-Chun Chiang
  - (Chinese Taipei) Yu-Chiang Hou
  - (Australia) Grace Kim
  - (South Korea) Kwon Seo-yun
  - (China) Wenbo Liu
  - (China) Du Mohan
  - (Japan) Yuna Nishimura
  - (South Korea) Ryu Hae-ran
  - (Japan) Riri Sadoyama
  - (Philippines) Yuka Saso
  - (Thailand) Patty Tavatanakit
  - (Thailand) Atthaya Thitikul
- 2023
  - (Japan) Mizuki Hashimoto
  - (Australia) Maddison Hinson-Tolchard
  - (Chinese Taipei) Huang Ting-hsuan
  - (Japan) Nanako Inagaki
  - (South Korea) Minsol Kim
  - (Australia) Caitlin Peirce
  - (India) Avani Prashanth
  - (Indonesia) Shannon Tan
  - (Thailand) Rina Tatematsu
  - (Indonesia) Elaine Widjaja
  - (South Korea) Yeji Park
  - (New Zealand) Fiona Xu
- 2025
  - (Thailand) Eila Galitsky
  - (Hong Kong) Sophie Han
  - (Chinese Taipei) Cindy Hsu Huai-chien
  - (South Korea) Jeong Min-seo
  - (Hong Kong) Arianna Lau
  - (New Zealand) Vivian Lu
  - (Japan) Aira Nagasawa
  - (China) Ren Yijia
  - (Japan) Mamika Shinichi
  - (Thailand) Suvichaya Vinichaitham
  - (Malaysia) Mirabel Ting
  - (China) Zhou Shiyuan
