= 2025 European Ladies' Team Championship =

Golf competition

Tournament information
- Dates: 8–12 July 2025
- Location: Paris, France; 49°12′20″N 2°29′00″E
- Course: Golf de Chantilly (Vineuil Course)
- Organized by: European Golf Association
- Format: 36 holes stroke play Knock-out match-play

Statistics
- Par: 70
- Length: 6,388 yards (5,841 m)
- Field: 20 teams 120 players

Champion
- Spain; Cayetana Fernández, Paula Francisco Llaño, Carolina López-Chacarra, Paula Martín Sampedro, Andrea Revuelta, Rocío Tejedo
- Qualification round: 699 (–1); Final match 4.5–2.5
- Location in Europe Location in France Location in Hauts-de-France

The 2025 European Ladies' Team Championship was held 8–12 July at Golf de Chantilly, outside Paris, France. It was the 42nd women's golf amateur European Ladies' Team Championship.

Defending champion was Germany.

== Venue ==
The hosting club, Golf de Chantilly, was founded in 1909. The Vineuil Course, situated in Chantilly, in the forest of the Hauts-de-France region of Northern France, 50 kilometres (30 miles) north of the center of Paris, close to the Château de Chantilly and Chantilly Racecourse, was originally designed by John Henry Taylor and later redesigned by Tom Simpson and Donald Steel. It has previously hosted eleven editions of the Open de France, the first in 1913 and the latest in 1990.

The championship course is set up with par 70.

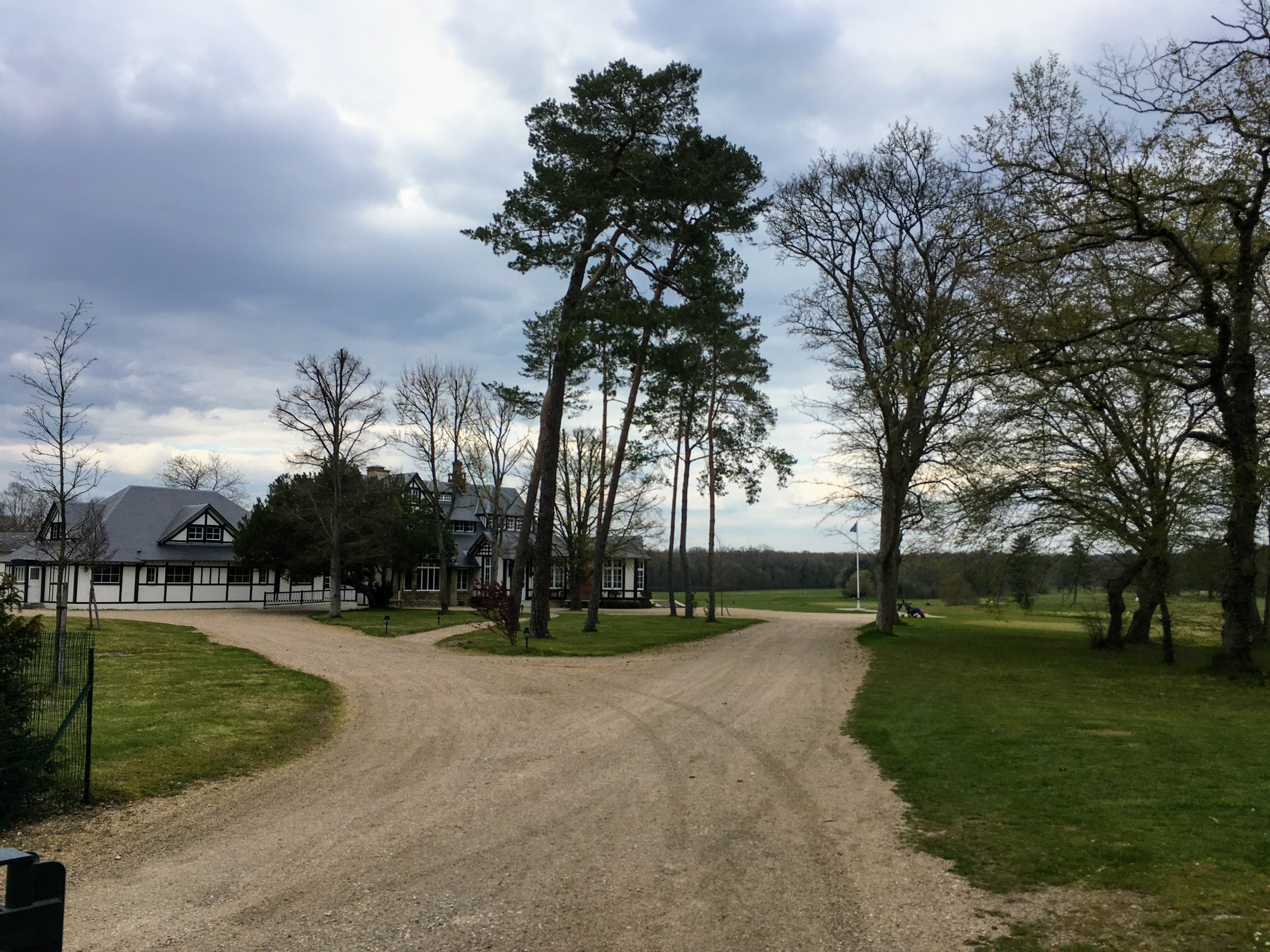
Entrée du Golf de Chantilly

=== Course layout ===
| Hole | Meters | Par | Hole | Meters | Par |
|---|---|---|---|---|---|
| 1 | 375 | 4 | 10 | 390 | 4 |
| 2 | 312 | 4 | 11 | 320 | 4 |
| 3 | 142 | 3 | 12 | 328 | 4 |
| 4 | 312 | 4 | 13 | 397 | 4 |
| 5 | 374 | 4 | 14 | 168 | 3 |
| 6 | 160 | 3 | 15 | 378 | 4 |
| 7 | 319 | 4 | 16 | 159 | 3 |
| 8 | 482 | 5 | 17 | 368 | 4 |
| 9 | 393 | 4 | 18 | 464 | 5 |
| Out | 2,869 | 35 | In | 2,972 | 35 |
| Source: | | Total | | 5,841 | 70 |

== Format ==
Each team consisted of six players, playing two rounds of an opening stroke-play qualifying competition over two days, counting the five best scores each day for each team.

The eight best teams formed flight A, in knock-out match-play over the next three days. The teams were seeded based on their positions after the stroke play. The first placed team was drawn to play the quarter-final against the eight placed team, the second against the seventh, the third against the sixth and the fourth against the fifth. Teams were allowed to use six players during the team matches, selecting four of them in the two morning foursome games and five players in to the afternoon single games. Teams knocked out after the quarter-finals played one foursome game and four single games in each of their remaining matches. Games all square at the 18th hole were declared halved, if the team match was already decided.

The eight teams placed 9–16 in the qualification stroke-play formed flight B, to play similar knock-out play, with one foursome game and four single games in each match, to decide their final positions.

The teams placed 17–20 in the stroke-play stage formed flight C, to meet each other to decide their final positions.

== Teams ==
20 teams contested the event.

Participating teams
| Country | Players |
|---|---|
| Austria | Victoria Bauer, Johanna Ebner, Johanna Janish, Katharina Schroll, Leonie Sinnhuber, Katharina Zeilinger |
| Belgium | Diane Baillieux, Sophie Bert, Savannah De Bock, Emma Defleur, Céline Manche, Elsie Verhoeven |
| Czech Republic | Anna Andrýsová, Veronika Kedroňová, Klára Hurtová, Sofie Hlinomazová, Sofie Dimitrova, Amálie Tauer |
| Denmark | Johanna Axelsen, Benedicte Brent-Buchholz, Emma Bunch, Olivia Grønborg Skousen, Marie Eline Madsen, Alvilda Wiberg |
| England | Sophia Fullbrook, Lily Hirst, Isla McDonald-O’Brien, Nellie Ong, Patience Rhodes, Davina Xanh |
| Finland | June Weckman, Sandra Palin, Anastasia Hekkonen, Emilia Väistö, Ada Huhtala, Oona Kuronen |
| France | Sara Brentcheneff, Valentine Delon, Constance Fouillet, Alice Kong, Camille Min-Gaultier, Louise Reau |
| Germany | Charlotte Back, Susanna Brenske, Chiara Horder, Stella Jelinek, Paula Schulz-Hanssen, Christin Walther-Eisenbeiß |
| Iceland | Andrea Ýr Ásmundsdóttir, Hulda Clara Gestsdóttir, Heiðrún Anna Hlynsdóttir, Eva Kristinsdóttir, Perla Sól Sigurbrandsdóttir, Elsa Maren Steinarsdóttir |
| Ireland | Beth Coulter, Anna Dawson, Aine Donegan, Emma Fleming, Rebekah Gardner, Marina Joyce Moreno |
| Italy | Paris Appendino, Caterina Don, Francesca Fiorellini, Carolina Melgrati, Matilde Partele |
| Netherlands | Rosanne Boere, Anne-Sterre den Dunnen, Britt op den Winkel, Minouche Rooijmans, Hester Sicking, Lynn van der Sluijs |
| Poland | Maja Ambroziak, Aleksandra Buczkowska, Kinga Kusmierska, Kleopatra Kozakiewicz, Matylda Krawczynska, Maria Moczarska |
| Portugal | Sofia Barroso Sá, Inês Belchior, Francisca Ferreira da Costa, Amelia Gabin, Francisca Salgado, Nicole Sardinha |
| Scotland | Grace Crawford, Hannah Darling, Abigail May, Freya Russell, Jennifer Saxton, Susan Woodhouse |
| Slovenia | Barbara Car, Eva Kiri Fevzer, Zala Jesih, Mia Lavrih, Neza Siftar, Tara Stjepanovic |
| Spain | Cayetana Fernández, Paula Francisco Llaño, Carolina López-Chacarra, Paula Martín Sampedro, Andrea Revuelta, Rocío Tejedo |
| Sweden | Elice Fredriksson, Meja Örtengren, Elin Pudas Remler, Nora Sundberg, Kajsalotta Svarvar, Moa Svedenskiöld |
| Switzerland | Yana Beeli, Amelie Kumar, Victoria Levy, Carlotta Locatelli, Romaine Masserey, Sarah Uebelhart |
| Wales | Millie Cottrell, Isobel Kelly, Harriet Lockley, Luca Thompson, Ffion Tynan, Carys Worby |

== Results ==
Qualification round

Team standings after first round
| Place | Country | Score | To par |
|---|---|---|---|
| 1 | Spain | 351 | +1 |
| 2 | Sweden * | 355 | +5 |
| 3 | France | 355 | +5 |
| 4 | Germany | 356 | +6 |
| 5 | Wales | 360 | +10 |
| 6 | Belgium | 361 | +11 |
| 7 | Italy | 364 | +14 |
| 8 | Ireland * | 366 | +16 |
| 9 | Austria | 366 | +16 |
| 10 | Denmark | 366 | +16 |
| 11 | England | 368 | +18 |
| 12 | Czech Republic | 370 | +20 |
| 13 | Netherlands | 371 | +21 |
| 14 | Portugal | 372 | +22 |
| 15 | Iceland* | 373 | +23 |
| 16 | Poland | 373 | +23 |
| 17 | Switzerland | 376 | +26 |
| 18 | Slovenia | 381 | +31 |
| 19 | Scotland | 386 | +36 |
| 20 | Finland | 391 | +41 |

Team standings after final qualification round
| Place | Country | Score | To par |
|---|---|---|---|
| 1 | Spain | 351-348=699 | −1 |
| 2 | France | 355-347=702 | +2 |
| 3 | Sweden | 355-356=711 | +11 |
| 4 | Germany | 356-357=713 | +13 |
| 5 | Wales | 360-355=715 | +15 |
| 6 | Ireland | 366-353=719 | +19 |
| 7 | Italy | 364-357=721 | +21 |
| 8 | England | 368-355=723 | +23 |
| 9 | Denmark | 368-358=724 | +24 |
| 10 | Belgium* | 361-367=728 | +28 |
| 11 | Austria | 366-362=728 | +28 |
| 12 | Czech Republic* | 370-363=733 | +33 |
| 13 | Netherlands | 371-362=733 | +33 |
| 14 | Switzerland | 376-370=746 | +46 |
| 15 | Iceland | 373-374=747 | +47 |
| 16 | Portugal | 372-377=749 | +49 |
| 17 | Poland | 373-377=750 | +50 |
| 18 | Scotland | 386-366=752 | +52 |
| 19 | Finland | 391-375=766 | +66 |
| 20 | Slovenia | 381-387=768 | +68 |

* Note: In the event of a tie the order was determined by the
best of the non-counting scores in each of the tied teams.

Individual leaders
| Place | Player | Country | Score | To par |
|---|---|---|---|---|
| 1 | Andrea Revuelta | Spain | 71-62=133 | −7 |
| 2 | Beth Coulter | Ireland | 68-66=134 | −6 |
| T3 | Paula Francisco Llaño | Spain | 73-65=138 | −2 |
| T3 | Constance Fouillet | France | 68-70=138 | −2 |
| T3 | Chiara Horder | Germany | 69-69=138 | −2 |
| T3 | Carolina López-Chacarra | Spain | 67-71=138 | −2 |
| T7 | Valentine Delon | France | 74-65=139 | −1 |
| T7 | Moa Svedenskiöld | Sweden | 67-72=139 | −1 |
| T9 | Sofia Barroso Sá | Portugal | 69-71=140 | E |
| T9 | Millie Cottrell | Wales | 70-70=140 | E |
| T9 | Marie Eline Madsen | Denmark | 69-71=140 | E |
| T9 | Céline Manche | Belgium | 69-71=140 | E |
| T9 | Carys Worby | Wales | 71-69=140 | E |

Note: There was no official award for the lowest individual score.

Flight A

Bracket

Quarter finals
Spain | 5
England | 2
Germany | 4
Wales | 3
Sweden | 4
Ireland | 3
France | 4
Italy | 3

Semi finals
Spain | 4.5
Germany | 2.5
France | 4
Sweden | 3

Final
Spain | 4.5
France | 2.5
Bronze match
Germany | 4.5
Sweden | 2.5

Elimination matches
England | 4
Wales | 1
Ireland | 3.5
Italy | 1.5

Match for 5th place
Ireland | 3
England | 2
Match for 7th place
Italy | 3
Wales | 2

Final games

| Spain | France |
| 4.5 | 2.5 |
| P. Francisco Llaño / P. Martín Sampedro | C. Fouillet / V. Delon 3 & 2 |
| A. Revuelta / C. Lopez-Chacarra Coto | S. Brentcheneff / C. Min-Gaultier 21st hole |
| Paula Martín Sampedro 2 & 1 | Sara Brentcheneff |
| Cayetana Fernández 4 & 2 | Alice Kong |
| Carolina López-Chacarra 4 & 2 | Camille Min-Gaultier |
| Paula Francisco Llaño 3 & 2 | Constance Fouillet |
| Andrea Revuelta A/S * | Valentine Delon A/S * |

* Note: Game declared halved, since team match already decided.

Flight B

Bracket

Round 1
Denmark | 4
Portugal | 1
Netherlands | 4
Czech Republic | 1
Switzerland | 3
Austria | 2
Belgium | 3.5
Iceland | 1.5

Round 2
Denmark | 4
Netherlands | 1
Belgium | 3.5
Switzerland | 1.5

Match for 9th place
Belgium | 3.5
Denmark | 1.5
Match for 11th place
Switzerland | 3
Netherlands | 2

Elimination matches
Portugal | 3
Czech Republic | 2
Iceland | 4
Austria | 1

Match for 13th place
Iceland | 3
Portugal | 2
Match for 15th place
Czech Republic | 4.5
Austria | 0.5

Flight C

Team matches
| 1 | Slovenia | Poland | 0 |
| 3 | | 2 | |

| 1 | Scotland | Finland | 0 |
| 3 | | 2 | |

| 1 | Poland | Finland | 0 |
| 3 | | 2 | |

| 1 | Slovenia | Scotland | 0 |
| 3 | | 2 | |

| 0.5 | Poland | Scotland | 0.5 |
| 2.5 | | 2.5 | |

| 1 | Finland | Slovenia | 0 |
| 4.5 | | 0.5 | |

Team standings
| Country | Place | W | T | L | Game points | Points |
|---|---|---|---|---|---|---|
| Slovenia | 17 | 2 | 0 | 1 | 6.5–8.5 | 2 |
| Scotland | 18 | 1 | 1 | 1 | 7.5–7.5 | 1.5 |
| Poland | 19 | 1 | 1 | 1 | 7.5–7.5 | 1.5 |
| Finland | 20 | 1 | 0 | 2 | 8.5–6.5 | 1 |

Final standings
| Place | Country |
|---|---|
| 1st place, gold medalist(s) | Spain |
| 2nd place, silver medalist(s) | France |
| 3rd place, bronze medalist(s) | Germany |
| 4 | Sweden |
| 5 | Ireland |
| 6 | England |
| 7 | Italy |
| 8 | Wales |
| 9 | Belgium |
| 10 | Denmark |
| 11 | Switzerland |
| 12 | Netherlands |
| 13 | Iceland |
| 14 | Portugal |
| 15 | Czech Republic |
| 16 | Austria |
| 17 | Slovenia |
| 18 | Scotland |
| 19 | Poland |
| 20 | Finland |

== See also ==
- Espirito Santo Trophy – biennial world amateur team golf championship for women organized by the International Golf Federation.
- European Amateur Team Championship – European amateur team golf championship for men organised by the European Golf Association.
- European Ladies Amateur Championship – European amateur individual golf championship for women organised by the European Golf Association.
