= 2026 European Ladies' Team Championship =

Golf competition

Tournament information
- Dates: 7–11 July 2026
- Location: Ballyconnell, Co. Cavan, Ireland; 54°07′00″N 7°35′00″W
- Course: PGA National Slieve Russell (Championship Course)
- Organized by: European Golf Association
- Format: 36 holes stroke play Knock-out match-play

Statistics
- Par: 72
- Length: 6,226 yards (5,693 m)
- Field: 22 teams 132 players

Champion
- Spain; Paula Balanzategui Garcia, Balma Davalos Guaita, Cayetana Fernández, Paula Francisco Liano, Paula Martin Sampedro, Andrea Revuelta
- Qualification round: 724 (+4); Final match 5–2
- Location in Europe Location in Ireland

The 2026 European Ladies' Team Championship was held 7–11 July at PGA National Slieve Russell, outside Ballyconnell Co. Cavan, Ireland. It was the 43rd women's golf amateur European Ladies' Team Championship.

Defending champion Team Spain won the championship.

== Venue ==
The championship course was designed by golf course architect Patrick Merrigan and opened in 1992. It was set up with par 72 for the championship.

=== Course layout ===
Hole	Yards	Par	Hole	Yards	Par
1	384	4	10	384	4
2	366	4	11	135	3
3	369	4	12	376	4
4	135	3	13	497	5
5	369	4	14	348	4
6	478	5	15	39'7	4
7	185	3	16	160	3
8	329	4	17	382	4
9	498	5	18	469	5
Out	3,113	35	In	3,113	36
Source:		Total		5,841	72

== Format ==
Each team consisted of six players, playing two rounds of an opening stroke-play qualifying competition over two days, counting the five best scores each day for each team.

The eight best teams formed flight A, in knock-out match-play over the next three days. The teams were seeded based on their positions after the stroke play. The first placed team was drawn to play the quarter-final against the eight placed team, the second against the seventh, the third against the sixth and the fourth against the fifth. Teams were allowed to use six players during the team matches, selecting four of them in the two morning foursome games and five players in to the afternoon single games. Teams knocked out after the quarter-finals played one foursome game and four single games in each of their remaining matches. Games all square at the 18th hole were declared halved, if the team match was already decided.

The eight teams placed 9–16 in the qualification stroke-play formed flight B, to play similar knock-out play, with one foursome game and four single games in each match, to decide their final positions.

The teams placed 17–22 in the stroke-play stage formed flight C, to meet each other to decide their final positions.

== Teams ==
22 teams contested the event.

Participating teams
Nation teams	Players
Austria	Victoria Bauer, Johanna Janisch, Eva Mooslechner, Katharina Schroll, Leonie Sinnhuber, Katharina Zeilinger
Belgium	Louise Cuyvers, Emma Defleur, Diane Denis, Sarah Helm, Audrey Lam, Elsie Verhoeven
Czech Republic	Jana Csicsayová, Klára Hurtová, Veronika Kedroňová, Kristina Lebová, Anna Ludvová, Tereza Zavřelová
Denmark	Liva Krøl Andersen, Benedicte Christine Brent-Petersen, Cecilie Bergstrøm Eggersen, Marie Eline Madsen, Alvilda Julia Wiberg, Anna Hjerrild Behnsen
England	Sophia Fullbrook, Lily Hirst, Charlotte Naughton, Nellie Ong, Patience Rhodes, Davina Xanh
Estonia	Anete Liis Adul, Kirke Kiige, Meribel Malva, Iiris Mätas, Roosi Ristal, Kristella Sikk
Finland	Fanni Grönlund, Anastasia Hekkonen, Ada Huhtala, Hanna Hänninen, Oona Kuronen, Emilia Väistö
France	Sara Brentcheneff, Valentine Delon, Constance Fouillet, Vaïrana Heck, Mila Jurine, Camille Min-Gaultier
Germany	Susanna Brenske, Stella Jelinek, Sophie Renner, Lotte Schuhr, Paula Schulz-Hanssen, Antonia Steiner
Iceland	Elsa Maren Steinarsdóttir, Eva Kristinsdóttir, Guðrún Jóna Nolan Þorsteinsdóttir, Karen Lind Stefánsdóttir, Perla Sól Sigurbrandsdóttir, Fjóla Margrét Viðarsdóttir
Ireland	Beth Coulter, Olivia Costello, Kate Dillon, Rebekah Gardner, Katie Poots, Jess Ross
Italy	Natalia Aparicio, Francesca Fiorellini, Francesca Pompa, Luce Ravizza, Gemma Simeoni, Noa Zocco
Luxembourg	Ella Miserini, Emma Lahaije, Lisa Steingrube, Marie Baertz, Natalie Tapella, Nina Wojtczak
Netherlands	Rosanne Boere, Anne-Sterre den Dunnen, Marieke Ebens, Minouche Rooijmans, Fleur van Beek, Noa van Beek
Poland	Maja Ambroziak, Natasza Klimko, Kleoptra Kozakiewicz, Kinga Kusmierska, Maria Moczarska, Nina Pitsch
Portugal	Sofia Barroso Sá, Francisca Ferreira da Costa, Luciana Reis, Francisca Rocha, Fancisca Salgado, Nicole Sardinha
Scotland	Sheridan Clancy, Rosie Maguire, Abigail May, Jade Potter, Freya Russell, Jennifer Saxton
Slovenia	Barbara Car, Zala Jesih, Eva Kiri Fevzer, Mia Lavrih, Neza Siftar, Tara Stjepanovic
Spain	Paula Balanzategui Garcia, Balma Davalos Guaita, Cayetana Fernández, Paula Francisco Liano, Paula Martin Sampedro, Andrea Revuelta
Sweden	Mira Berglund, Matilda Björkman, Ebba Liljenberg, Ebba Nordstedt, Kajsalotta Svarvar, Meja Örtengren
Switzerland	Yana Beeli, Victoria Levy, Carlotta Locatelli, Romaine Masserey, Seraphine Müller, Sarah Uebelhart
Wales	Millie Cottrell, Isobel Kelly, Harriet Lockley, Luca Thompson, Ffion Tynan, Carys Worby

== Results ==
Qualification round

Team standings after final qualification round
Place	Country	Score	To par
1	France	354-357=711	−9
2	Sweden	358-362=720	E
3	Spain	369-355=724	+4
4	Denmark	366-362=728	+8
5	England	357-374=731	+11
6	Ireland	359-373=732	+12
7	Finland	374-363=737	+17
8	Italy *	364-376=740	+20
9	Belgium	373-367=740	+20
10	Netherlands	373-369=742	+22
11	Czech Republic *	375-371=746	+26
12	Switzerland	375-371=746	+26
13	Austria	376-373=749	+29
14	Germany	377-374=751	+31
15	Iceland	385-376=761	+41
16	Poland	392-378=770	+50
17	Scotland	396-3'76=772	+52
18	Slovenia	388-386=774	+54
19	Wales	393-388=781	+61
20	Estonia	393-396=789	+69
21	Portugal	389-402=791	+71
22	Luxembourg	398-400=798	+78

* Note: In the event of a tie the order was determined by the
best of the non-counting scores in each of the tied teams.

Individual leaders
Place	Player	Country	Score	To par
1	Marie Eline Madsen	Denmark	67-69=136	−8
T2	Kate Dillon	Ireland	68-70=138	−6
T2	Vaïrana Heck	France	70-68=138	−6
T4	Balma Davalos Guaita	Spain	71-68=139	−5
T4	Valentine Delon	France	69-70=139	−5
T4	Sarah Uebelhart	Switzerland	69-70=139	−5
T7	Anne-Sterre den Dunnen	Netherlands	71-69=140	−4
T7	Meja Örtengren	Sweden	69-71=140	−4
T9	Francesca Fiorellini	Italy	69-72=141	−3
T9	Audrey Lam	Belgium	71-70=141	−3
T9	Paula Martin Sampedro	Spain	71-70=141	−3
T9	Ebba Nordstedt	Sweden	71-70=141	−3

Note: There was no official award for the lowest individual score.

Flight A

Bracket

Quarter finals
France	5
Italy	2
England	4.5
Denmark	2.5
Spain	6.5
Ireland	0.5
Finland	4
Sweden	3

Semi finals
France	5.5
England	1.5
Spain	4.5
Finland	2.5

Final
Spain	5
France	2
Bronze match
England	4.5
Finland	2.5

Elimination matches
Denmark	4
Italy	1
Sweden	3.5
Ireland	1.5

Match for 5th place
Sweden	3.5
Denmark	1.5
Match for 7th place
Italy	3
Ireland	2

Final games

Spain	France
5	2
B. Davalos Guaita / P. Martín Sampedro 20th hole	C. Fouillet / V. Delon
A. Revuelta / C. Fernández 1 hoie	V. Heck / C. Min-Gaultier
Paula Francisco Liano	Valentine Delon 6 & 5
Balma Davalos Guaita 2 & 1	Vairana Heck
Andrea Revuelta AS *	Constance Fouillet AS *
Paula Martin Sampedro 5 & 3	Camille Min-Gaultier
Cayetana Fernandez A/S *	Sara Brencheneff A/S *

* Note: Game declared halved, when team match already decided.

Flight B

Bracket

Round 1
Poland	3.5
Belgium	1.5
Austria	4
Switzerland	1
Germany	3.5
Czech Republic	1.5
Netherlands	3
Iceland	2

Round 2
Poland	4
Austria	1
Netherlands	3
Germany	2

Match for 9th place
Netherlands	4
Poland	1
Match for 11th place
Austria	3.5
Germany	1.5

Elimination matches
Switzerland	4
Belgium	1
Czech Republic	3
Iceland	2

Match for 13th place
Switzerland	3
Czech Republic	2
Match for 15th place
Belgium	3
Iceland	2

Flight C

Bracket

Round 1
Portugal	3
Estonia	2
Wales	4.5
Luxembourg	0.5

Round 2
Scotland	3.5
Portugal	1.5
Wales	3.5
Slovenia	1.5

Match for 17th place
Wales	3
Scotland	2
Match for 19th place
Slovenia	3.5
Portugal	1.5

Round 1

Match for 21st place
Luxembourg	3
Estonia	2

Final standings
Place	Country
1st place, gold medalist(s)	Spain
2nd place, silver medalist(s)	France
3rd place, bronze medalist(s)	England
4	Finland
5	Sweden
6	Denmark
7	Italy
8	Ireland
9	Netherlands
10	Poland
11	Austria
12	Germany
13	Switzerland
14	Czech Republic
15	Belgium
16	Iceland
17	Wales
18	Scotland
19	Slovenia
20	Portugal
21	Luxembourg
22	Estonia

== See also ==
- Espirito Santo Trophy – biennial world amateur team golf championship for women organized by the International Golf Federation.
- European Amateur Team Championship – European amateur team golf championship for men organised by the European Golf Association.
- European Ladies Amateur Championship – European amateur individual golf championship for women organised by the European Golf Association.
