= Havanna Torstensson =

Swedish golfer

Personal information
- Full name: Havanna Maria Torstensson
- Nationality: Sweden
- Born: 12 November 2007 (age 18) Halmstad, Sweden

Career
- Sport: Golf
- Status: Amateur

Havanna Torstensson (born 12 November 2007) is a Swedish amateur golfer. She won the 95th Girls Amateur Championship in 2024.

== Early life and amateur career ==
Torstensson was born in 2007 in Halmstad, and represents Halmstad Golf Club.

At age 14, Torstensson made her Ladies European Tour debut at the 2022 Skaftö Open, where she shot an opening round 65 and ultimately finished tied 26th. She won the 2022 Teen Tour Future #4 Blekinge at Sölvesborg Golf Club, 22 strokes ahead of Emma Heyman in second.

In 2023, she joined the national team and played in the European Girls' Team Championship. Torstensson was runner-up at the Slovenian International Amateur Championship, and 3rd at the Internazionali d'Italia Femminili U18, a stroke behind winner Justine Bayle of France.

In 2024, Torstensson finished 4th at the German Girls Open. She won the Girls Amateur Championship, beating Poland's Matylda Krawczyńska, 8 and 7, in the final at Alwoodley Golf Club, becoming the third Swedish winner following Maria Hjorth in 1991 and Anna Nordqvist in 2005. With her win, she received invitations into the Women's Amateur Championship, the U.S. Girls' Junior, and the Augusta National Women's Amateur.

Torstensson played for the European team in the 2024 Junior Solheim Cup at Army Navy Country Club in Virginia by captain Gwladys Nocera. She is a commit to Wake Forest University for class of 2026.

== Amateur wins ==
- 2022 Teen Tour Future #4 Blekinge
- 2023 Teen Cup Riksfinal F16
- 2024 Girls Amateur Championship
- 2026 European Nations Cup – Copa Sotogrande

== Team appearances ==
Amateur

- European Girls' Team Championship (representing Sweden): 2023, 2024
- Junior Solheim Cup (representing Europe): 2024
- World Junior Girls Championship (representing Sweden): 2024
- European Nations Cup – Copa Sotogrande (representing Sweden): 2026 (winners)
