= Andrea Revuelta =

Spanish golfer (born 2006)

Personal information
- Full name: Andrea Revuelta Goicoechea
- Nationality: Spain
- Born: 2006 (age 19–20) Madrid, Spain

Career
- Sport: Golf
- Status: Amateur

Best results in LPGA major championships
- Chevron Championship: T59: 2026

Andrea Revuelta Goicoechea (born 2006) is a Spanish amateur golfer. In 2022, she won the World Junior Girls Championship and the Junior Golf World Cup. She became the top-ranked amateur golfer in the World Amateur Golf Ranking in September 2026.

== Amateur career ==
Revuelta dedicated many years to classic ballet dancing before transitioning to a successful amateur golf career. She achieved success in 2021, finishing 3rd at the Portuguese International Ladies Amateur Championship, behind Lucie Malchirand and Vairana Heck. In 2022, she reached the semi-finals of the Spanish International Ladies Amateur Championship, ultimately won by her compatriot Cayetana Fernández García-Poggio. That same year, she secured a runner-up finish at the Santander Campeonato De Espana Profesionales Femenino.

Revuelta represented Europe on the winning 2021 and 2023 Junior Solheim Cup, 2022 Junior Vagliano Trophy and 2023 Junior Ryder Cup teams. She won the World Junior Girls Championship and the Junior Golf World Cup with Spain in 2022.

In 2023, she tied for 4th at the European Nations Cup - Copa Sotogrande, and for 4th at the 2023 Junior Invitational at Sage Valley. She lost the final of the French International Lady Juniors Amateur Championship to Meja Örtengren, one down. She played in the tour final of the Ladies European Tour, the Andalucia Costa Del Sol Open De España, where she shot 10-under-par and finished in tied 7th place after rounds of 69-70-69-70.

In 2024, she won the Spanish International Ladies Amateur Championship, 2 and 1, over Sara Brentcheneff of France, after defeating Annabel Wilson, 4 and 3, in the semifinals and defending champion Nora Sundberg. 2 and 1, in the quarterfinals. She was runner-up at the European Ladies Amateur, 2 strokes behind Louise Rydqvist.

Revuelta enrolled at Stanford University in the fall of 2024 and started playing with the Stanford Cardinal women's golf team. In 2025, she won the Atlantic Coast Conference Championship. She tied for 4th at the Augusta National Women's Amateur in 2023 and was runner-up in 2026, behind María José Marín.

== Personal life ==
Her siblings Álvaro, Amanda and Ángela are all golfers. In 2018, all four competed in the Campeonato de España Infantil.

== Amateur wins ==
- 2020 Campeonato de Madrid
- 2021 Campeonato de Espana Sub-18 Femenino, Campeonato R.S.H.E Club de Campo
- 2022 Junior Golf World Cup (individual)
- 2023 Campeonato de Espana Amateur V Memorial Emma Villacieros
- 2024 Spanish International Ladies Amateur Championship, Campeonato de Espana Amateur VI Memorial Emma Villacieros
- 2025 ACC Championship, NCAA Norman Regional
- 2026 Arizona Thunderbird Intercollegiate, NCAA Stanford Regional

== Results in LPGA majors ==
Tournament	2026
Chevron Championship	T59
U.S. Women's Open	
Women's PGA Championship	
The Evian Championship	
Women's British Open	

Did not play

CUT = missed the half-way cut
"T" = tied

== Team appearances ==
Amateur

- European Girls' Team Championship (representing Spain): 2021 (winners), 2022, 2023
- European Young Masters (representing Spain): 2021
- Junior Solheim Cup (representing Europe): 2021 (winners), 2023 (winners), 2024
- Junior Vagliano Trophy (representing Europe): 2022 (winners)
- Junior Golf World Cup (representing Spain): 2022 (winners)
- World Junior Girls Championship (representing Spain): 2022 (winners), 2023
- Junior Ryder Cup (representing Europe): 2023 (winners)
- European Ladies' Team Championship (representing Spain): 2024, 2025 (winners), 2026 (winners)
- Arnold Palmer Cup (representing International team): 2025 (winners)
- Espirito Santo Trophy (representing Spain): 2025
