= Lucie Malchirand =

French professional golfer (born 2003)

Personal information
- Nationality: France
- Born: 21 February 2003 (age 23) Aix-en-Provence, France

Career
- Sport: Golf
- Turned professional: 2021
- Current tour: LET Access Series
- Former tour: Ladies European Tour (joined 2021)
- Professional wins: 3

Number of wins by tour
- Ladies European Tour: 1
- Other: 2

Best results in LPGA major championships
- Chevron Championship: DNP
- Women's PGA C'ship: DNP
- U.S. Women's Open: CUT: 2020
- Women's British Open: CUT: 2021
- Evian Championship: 76th: 2021

Lucie Malchirand (born 21 February 2003) is a French professional golfer and Ladies European Tour player. In 2021 she won the Ladies Italian Open as an 18 year old amateur.

== Amateur career ==
Malchirand had a successful amateur career and reached number 10 in the World Amateur Golf Ranking. She won the Grand Prix de ligue PACA Dames in 2018 and 2020, the International Juniors of Belgium in 2018 and Internationaux de France U21 - Trophee Esmond in 2019. She finished second in the 2020 Junior Orange Bowl in Florida. She was runner-up at the Portuguese International Ladies Amateur Championship in 2019 and won the event in 2021.

She represented France at the 2017 Toyota Junior Golf World Cup and at the European Girls' Team Championship three times. She played for Europe in the 2019 Junior Solheim Cup at Gleneagles and was part of the winning Junior Vagliano Trophy team in 2019.

Malchirand made her major debut at the 2020 U.S. Women's Open by virtue of being number 14 in the World Amateur Golf Ranking.

== Professional career ==
Malchirand turned professional and joined the Ladies European Tour after she won the 2021 Ladies Italian Open. She won by one stroke following back-to-back birdies on the final two holes, after she received an invitation to the event having won the Portuguese International Ladies Amateur Championship two weeks earlier. She received an invitation to the 2021 Evian Championship, where she made the cut.

In 2024, Malchirand won the Santander Golf Tour Sevilla, held at Zaudín Golf Club, after a final round of 63 strokes (-8), to force the Spanish players to settle for second and third place.

== Amateur wins (6) ==
- 2018 Grand Prix de ligue PACA Dames, International Juniors of Belgium
- 2019 Internationaux de France U21 - Trophee Esmond
- 2020 Grand Prix de ligue PACA Dames, GTGA Invitational
- 2021 Portuguese International Ladies Amateur Championship

== Professional wins (3) ==
=== Ladies European Tour wins (1) ===
No.	Date	Tournament	Winning score	To par	Margin of victory	Runners-up
1	30 May 2021	Ladies Italian Open (as an amateur)	66-71-72=209	−7	1 stroke	(England) Gabriella Cowley (Finland) Ursula Wikström

=== Sunshine Ladies Tour wins (1) ===
No.	Date	Tournament	Winning score	To par	Margin of victory	Runners-up
1	22 Feb 2025	Standard Bank Ladies Open	64-68-72=204	−12	4 strokes	(South Africa) Casandra Alexander (Netherlands) Romy Meekers

=== Santander Golf Tour wins (1) ===
No.	Date	Tournament	Winning score	To par	Margin of victory	Runner-up
1	7 Nov 2024	Santander Golf Tour Sevilla	68-63=131	−11	3 strokes	(Spain) Amaia Latorre

== Team appearances ==
Amateur

- European Girls' Team Championship (representing France): 2016, 2018, 2019
- Toyota Junior Golf World Cup (representing France): 2017
- Junior Vagliano Trophy (representing the Continent of Europe): 2019 (winners)
- Junior Solheim Cup (representing Europe): 2019
- European Ladies' Team Championship (representing France): 2020, 2021
