= Moa Svedenskiöld =

Swedish professional golfer (born 2003)

Personal information
- Nationality: Sweden
- Born: 17 November 2003 (age 22) Uppsala, Sweden
- Height: 6 ft 0 in (1.83 m)

Career
- Sport: Golf
- College: University of Houston
- Turned professional: 2026
- Current tour: LET Access Series (joined 2026)
- Professional wins: 2

Moa Svedenskiöld (born 17 November 2003) is a Swedish professional golfer and LET Access Series player. She won the 2026 Ladies German Challenge.

== Early life and amateur career ==
Svedenskiöld was born in Uppsala and later moved to Helsingborg. She attended Asperö idrottsgymnasium for golf in Halmstad, where she became a member of Ringenäs Golf Club.

She won a handful of titles on the Swedish junior tour, and was runner-up at the 2021 Irish Women's Open Stroke Play Championship, behind Charlotte Back of Germany. She won the 2021 Swedish Golf Team Invitation, six strokes ahead of Johanna Sjursen in second and Elice Fredriksson in third.

Svedenskiöld made her Ladies European Tour debut at the 2023 Helsingborg Open, where she made the cut and shot a 68 in the second round at Allerum Golf Club.

Svedenskiöld was part of the national squad, and her teams finished 4th at the 2025 European Ladies' Team Championship and 6th at the 2025 Espirito Santo Trophy, both including Meja Örtengren.

== College career ==
Svedenskiöld attended the University of Houston 2022–2026, following in the footsteps of compatriot Ingrid Lindblad. Playing with the Houston Cougars women's golf team she set several scoring records, won three individual titles, was named to the All-Big 12 Conference Team twice, and was individual qualifier to the 2025 NCAA Championship. She finished runner-up at The American Championship in 2023.

== Professional career ==
Svedenskiöld turned professional after graduating in May 2026 and joined the LET Access Series. She made her pro debut at the Arkea Montauban Ladies Open in France, where she finished solo 3rd, two strokes behind the winner. In her next start, she won her first professional title at the Ladies German Challenge. In August, she clinched her second title at the CSK Steel Women's Open at HimmerLand Resort in Denmark after prevailing in a three-way playoff.

Svedenskiöld made her Ladies European Tour debut as a professional at the 2026 VP Bank Swiss Ladies Open, where she finished in the top-10.

== Amateur wins ==
- 2019 Teen Tour Future #2, Teen Tour Future #4
- 2020 Ringenäs JMI Junior Open
- 2021 Swedish Golf Team Invitation
- 2022 Ringenäs Junior Open, Jim West Challenge
- 2025 Riverbend Intercollegiate, Veritex Bank Collegiate

== Professional wins (2) ==
=== LET Access Series (2) ===
No.	Date	Tournament	Winning score	To par	Margin of victory	Runners-up
1	21 Jun 2026	Ladies German Challenge	69-68-70=207	−9	2 strokes	(France) Lauren Holmey (England) Bel Wardle
2	7 Aug 2026	CSK Steel Women's Open	74-78-69=221	+5	Playoff	(Republic of Ireland) Beth Coulter (Germany) Lena Geier (a)

LET Access Series playoff record (1–0)

No.	Year	Tournament	Opponents	Result
1	2026	CSK Steel Women's Open	(Republic of Ireland) Beth Coulter, (Germany) Lena Geier (a)	Won with par on fourth extra hole

== Team appearances ==
Amateur

- European Ladies' Team Championship (representing Sweden): 2023, 2024, 2025
- Spirit International Amateur (representing Sweden): 2024
- Espirito Santo Trophy (representing Sweden): 2025
