= Rocío Tejedo =

Spanish golfer (born 2006)

Personal information
- Full name: Rocío Tejedo Mulet
- Nationality: Spain
- Born: 1 August 2006 (age 20) Castellón de la Plana, Spain
- Height: 5 ft 6 in (168 cm)

Career
- Sport: Golf
- College: Louisiana State University
- Status: Amateur

Achievements and awards
- SEC Freshman of the Year: 2025

Rocío Tejedo Mulet (born 1 August 2006) is a Spanish amateur golfer. In 2023, she won the Portuguese International Ladies Amateur Championship, European Nations Cup – Copa Sotogrande and the German Girls Open, the European Girls' Team Championship with Spain, and the Patsy Hankins Trophy, Junior Solheim Cup and Junior Ryder Cup with Europe.

== Amateur career ==
Tejedo had a successful amateur career as a junior, and at only 16, she rose to 12th in the World Amateur Golf Ranking (WAGR). In 2020, she won four of her six WAGR starts and finished runner-up in the other two events. In 2021, she won the Spanish Under-16 Championship.

In 2023, she won five WAGR events, including both the Portuguese International Ladies Amateur Championship and the German Girls Open. She reached the quarterfinals of the Girls Amateur Championship, finished tied 6th in the European Ladies Amateur in Sweden, and was a member of winning European teams in both the Junior Solheim Cup in Spain and Junior Ryder Cup in Italy.

Tejedo enrolled at Louisiana State University (LSU) in the fall of 2024 and started playing with the LSU Lady Tigers golf team. She was named to the final fall watchlist for the Annika Award and SEC Freshman of the Year.

== Personal life ==
Her four years older sister Carla, is also an accomplished golfer who attended LSU and played for Spain, and then joined the Epson Tour.

== Amateur wins ==
- 2020 Copa Club de Campo Sojuela, Campeonato Sub-18 Comunidad Valenciana, Campeonato de Castellon, Copa de la Comunidad Valenciana
- 2021 Campeonato de Espana Sub-16 Femenino, Campeonato Sub-18 Comunidad Valenciana
- 2022 Copa Andalucia
- 2023 Copa Andalucia, Portuguese International Ladies Amateur Championship, Copa Catalunya Femenina, European Nations Cup – Copa Sotogrande, German Girls Open

== Team appearances ==
Amateur

- Junior Golf World Cup (representing Spain): 2023
- European Girls' Team Championship (representing Spain): 2023 (winners), 2024
- European Nations Cup - Copa Sotogrande (representing Spain): 2023 (winners)
- Vagliano Trophy (representing Europe): 2023 (winners)
- Patsy Hankins Trophy (representing Europe): 2023 (winners), 2025
- Junior Solheim Cup (representing Europe): 2023 (winners)
- Junior Ryder Cup (representing Europe): 2023 (winners)
- World Junior Girls Championship (representing Spain): 2023
- European Ladies' Team Championship (representing Spain): 2025 (winners)
