= Spanish International Ladies Amateur Championship =

Annual amateur golf tournament in Spain

Tournament information
- Location: Spain
- Course: Rotating
- Organised by: Royal Spanish Golf Federation
- Format: Match play
- Month played: March

Current champion
- (Spain) Nagore Martinez

The Spanish International Ladies Amateur Championship (Copa S.M. la Reina) is an annual amateur golf tournament in Spain for women.

It is an "A" rated tournament in the World Amateur Golf Ranking and a qualifying event for the European teams in the Junior Ryder Cup and Junior Solheim Cup.

The tournament begins with 36 holes of stroke play, were the best placed players qualify for a following match play competition. In 2020, the 32 best players qualified for the match-play.

Every year the tournament has taken place, the Spanish International Amateur Championship for men has also been played, until 1985 on the same course as the ladies' tournament.

== Winners ==
| Year | Venue | Champion | Score | Runner-up | Ref |
|---|---|---|---|---|---|
| 2026 | La Reserva, Sotogrande | (Denmark) Sara Skovgaard Bils | 1 up | (England) Elizabeth Wilson | |
| 2025 | El Prat | (Spain) Nagore Martinez | 1 up | (Republic of Ireland) Olivia Costello | |
| 2024 | RCG Guadalhorce | (Spain) Andrea Revuelta Goicoechea | 2 & 1 | (France) Sara Brentcheneff | |
| 2023 | La Reserva, Sotogrande | (Sweden) Nora Sundberg | 2 & 1 | (Belgium) Savannah De Bock | |
| 2022 | RCG Pineda | (Spain) Cayetana Fernández García-Poggio | 1 up | (Germany) Charlotte Back | |
| 2021 | Real Club de Golf de Sevilla | (Spain) Carla Bernat Escuder | 2 & 1 | (Spain) Julia Lopez Ramirez | |
| 2020 | RCG Tenerife | (France) Lilas Pinther | 22 holes | (Spain) Cayetana Fernández García-Poggio | |
| 2019 | El Zaudin, Sevilla | (France) Candice Mahé | 21 holes | (Italy) Alessia Nobilio | |
| 2018 | Montecastillo Barceló, Cádiz | (Sweden) Frida Kinhult | 1 up | (Spain) Natalia Aseguinolaza Martin | |
| 2017 | Sherry Golf, Jerez | (Sweden) Frida Kinhult | 19 holes | (Italy) Alessia Nobilio | |
| 2016 | Club de Golf Escorpion | (Spain) Marta Perez Sanmartin | 1 up | (France) Chloé Salort | |
| 2015 | Pineda de Sevilla | (Germany) Olivia Cowan | 2 & 1 | (Sweden) Linnea Ström | |
| 2014 | El Saler | (Sweden) Linnea Ström | 2 & 1 | (England) Annabel Dimmock | |
| 2013 | Pula Golf | (Denmark) Emily Kristine Pedersen | 3 & 2 | (Sweden) Linnea Ström | |
| 2012 | El Valle | (Germany) Karolin Lampert | 4 & 3 | (Netherlands) Ileen Domela Nieuwenhuis | |
| 2011 | Sherry Golf Jerez | (Republic of Ireland) Lisa Maguire | 1 up | (France) Émilie Alonso | |
| 2010 | Platja de Pals | (Spain) Nerea Salaverría | 1 up | (Sweden) Emma Nilsson | |
| 2009 | Las Palmas | (France) Lucie André | 5 & 4 | (France) Rosanna Crepiat | |
| 2008 | La Reserva | (Germany) Caroline Masson | 2 & 1 | (Spain) Adriana Zwanck | |
| 2007 | Sherry Golf | (Germany) Katharina Schallenberg | 3 & 2 | (Germany) Nicole Roessler | |
| 2006 | Isla Canela | (Spain) Carlota Ciganda | 19 holes | (Sweden) Caroline Hedwall | |
| 2005 | Costa Ballena | (Spain) Carlota Ciganda | 1 up | (Spain) Azahara Muñoz | |
| 2004 | El Bosque | (Spain) Beatriz Recari | 4/3 | (Spain) Carlota Ciganda | |
| 2003 | El Saler | (Spain) Adriana Zwanck | 20 holes | (Germany) Denise Simon | |
| 2002 | Montecastillo | (Germany) Martina Eberl | 3 & 2 | (England) Rebecca Hudson | |
| 2001 | Sevilla | (Switzerland) Niloufar Azam | 1 stroke | (England) Rebecca Hudson | |
| 2000 | Pals | (England) Rebecca Hudson | 3 & 1 | (Spain) Tania Elósegui | |
| 1999 | Pineda | (France) Stéphanie Arricau | 2 up | (England) Rebecca Hudson | |
| 1998 | El Bosque | (England) Fiona Brown | 5 & 3 | (Germany) Martina Eberl | |
| 1997 | Zaudín | (France) Karine Icher | 3 & 2 | (France) Maitena Alsuguren | |
| 1996 | Villamartín | (England) Julie Hall | 5 & 3 | (Sweden) Maria Hjorth | |
| 1995 | Las Brisas | (Sweden) Maria Hjorth | 6 & 5 | (Spain) Ana Belén Sánchez | |
| 1994 | Empordá | (Sweden) Anna-Carin Jonasson | 20 holes | (France) Stephanie Dallongeville | |
| 1993 | San Roque | (Scotland) Catriona Lambert | 1 stroke | (Scotland) Janice Moodie | |
| 1992 | El Saler | (England) Julie Hall | 5 & 3 | (Italy) Silvia Cavalleri | |
| 1991 | Sotogrande | (Italy) Caterina Quintarelli | 4 & 3 | (Spain) Laura Navarro | |
| 1990 | El Bosque | (France) Delphine Bourson | 4 & 3 | (Spain) Amaya Arruti | |
| 1989 | Los Naranjos | (Italy) Isabella Calogero | 21 holes | (Spain) Macarena Campomanes | |
| 1988 | Pals | (Spain) Mary Carmen Navarro | 3 & 2 | (France) Valérie Michaud | |
| 1987 | Las Brisas | (Republic of Ireland) Claire Hourihane | 3 & 2 | (Spain) Xonia Wunsch-Ruiz | |
| 1986 | Aloha | (Switzerland) Regine Lautens | 7 & 5 | (Germany) Martina Koch | |
| 1985 | Las Brisas | (France) Karine Espinasse | 11 & 9 | (Italy) Marina Buscaini | |
| 1984 | El Prat | (Spain) Mary Carmen Navarro | 1 up | (Scotland) Gillian Stewart | |
| 1983 | Sotogrande | (France) Marie-Laure de Lorenzi | 1 up | (England) Claire Waite | |
| 1982 | Santa Ponsa | (France) Cécilia Mourgue d'Algue | 6 & 5 | (Wales) Vicki Thomas | |
| 1981 | Torrequebrada | (Spain) Cristina Marsans | 2 up | (Spain) Condesa de Albox | |
| 1980 | El Saler | (France) Marie-Laure de Lorenzi | 6 & 5 | (France) Martine Crochet | |
| 1979 | Sotogrande | (Spain) Cristina Marsans | 2 up | (Spain) Condesa de Albox | |
| 1978 | El Prat | (France) Marie-Laure de Lorenzi | 4 & 2 | (France) U. Cocquet | |
| 1977 | Sotogrande | (Spain) Cristina Marsans | 1 up | (France) Anne-Marie Palli | |
| 1976 | Aloha | (France) Catherine Lacoste | 3 & 2 | (France) Odile Garaïalde | |
| 1975 | Las Brisas | (France) Nathalie Jeanson | 4 & 3 | (France) Martine Giraud | |
| 1974 | Atalaya | (France) Anne-Marie Palli | 4 & 3 | (Spain) Carmen Maestre | |
| 1973 | Sotogrande | (England) Michele Walker | 3 & 2 | (Spain) Cristina Marsans | |
| 1972 | Málaga | (France) Catherine Lacoste | 9 & 8 | (France) Odile Garaïalde | |
| 1971 | Pedreña | (Spain) Vicky Pertierra | 3 & 2 | (Spain) Condesa de Albox | |
| 1970 | Pals | (Spain) Elena Corominas | 2 & 1 | (France) P.S. de Rottier | |
| 1969 | Club de Campo | (France) Catherine Lacoste | 10 & 9 | (Spain) Marquesa de Villa Alegre | |
| 1968 | Río Real | (England) A. Higgotte | 6 & 5 | Sra. de Tullis | |
| 1967 | Neguri | (Spain) Marta Balet | 4 & 3 | (Spain) Sra. de Aspiazu | |
| 1966 | El Prat | (Spain) Marta Balet | 2 & 1 | María Elena Corachán de Gibernau | |
| 1965 | Puerta de Hierro | (Spain) Cristina Marsans | 3 & 2 | Isabel Gómez Acebo | |
| 1964 | Club de Campo | Sra. de Lepori | | (Spain) Emma Villacieros de García-Ogara | |
| 1963 | El Prat | (Spain) Ana María Marfull | 4 & 3 | (Spain) Mercedes Etchart de Ártiach | |
| 1962 | Puerta de Hierro | (Spain) Mercedes Etchart de Ártiach | 5 & 4 | (Spain) Ana María Marfull | |
| 1961 | Club de Campo | (Belgium) Louise Van den Berghe | | (Spain) Ana María Marfull | |
| 1960 | El Prat | (France) Martine Gajan | | (Spain) Duquesa del Arco | |
| 1959 | Puerta de Hierro | (Mexico) Sandra Clifford Fullmer | | (Spain) Rosa Culto de Serra | |
| 1958 | Club de Campo | (Spain) Sofía Pérez de Tordesillas | 1 up | (Spain) Valvanuz Pérez de Tordesillas | |
| 1957 | El Prat | María Elena Corachán de Gibernau | | (Belgium) Mme. Moerman | |
| 1956 | Puerta de Hierro | (Italy) Rosanna Bérgamo | 11 & 9 | (Spain) Condesa de Puerto Hermoso | |
| 1955 | No tournament | | | | |
| 1954 | Puerta de Hierro | (Spain) Elvira Larrazábal | 2 up | (Italy) Vanda Rosa | |
| 1953 | Puerta de Hierro | (Spain) Elvira Larrazábal | | (Spain) Mercedes Etchart de Ártiach | |
| 1952 | Puerta de Hierro | (Italy) Isa Goldschmid-Bevione | | (Spain) Nuria Soler de Fdez. Villaverde | |
| 1951 | Puerta de Hierro | (France) Lally Vagliano Segard | | (Spain) Nuria Soler de Fdez. Villaverde | |
| 1950 | Puerta de Hierro | (Spain) Marquesa de Movellán | | (Spain) Marquesa de Sobroso | |
| 1949 | No tournament | | | | |
| 1948 | Puerta de Hierro | (Spain) Marquesa de Sobroso | | (Spain) María Tordesillas | |
| 1947 | Pedreña | (Spain) Marquesa de Sobroso | | (Spain) Nuria Soler de Fdez. Villaverde | |
| 1946 | Puerta de Hierro | (Spain) Marquesa de Sobroso | | (Spain) María Tordesillas | |
| 1945 | San Cugat | Dona Concha Rouet | | | |
| 1944 | Puerta de Hierro | (Spain) Ana Maria Perogordo Penaske de Ugarte | | (Spain) Rosario Churruca | |
| 1943 | Pedreña | (Spain) Ana Maria Perogordo Penaske de Ugarte | | (Spain) Marquesa de Sabroso | |
| 1942 | Puerta de Hierro | (Spain) Ana Maria Perogordo Penaske de Ugarte | | (Spain) Amalia López Dóriga | |
| 1941 | Pedreña | (Spain) Ana Maria Perogordo Penaske de Ugarte | | (Spain) Amalia López Dóriga | |
| 1936–40 | No tournament | | | | |
| 1935 | Puerta de Hierro | Sra. de Gandarias | | | |
| 1934 | Puerta de Hierro | Sra. de Gandarias | | | |
| 1933 | Puerta de Hierro | Sra. de Gandarias | | | |
| 1932 | Puerta de Hierro | Sra. de Gandarias | | | |
| 1931 | Puerta de Hierro | Duquesa de Lecera | | | |
| 1930 | Puerta de Hierro | (Spain) Teresa Arteche | | | |
| 1929 | Puerta de Hierro | (Spain) Pilar Lezama Leguizamón | | | |
| 1928 | Puerta de Hierro | (Spain) Amalia López Dóriga | | | |
| 1927 | Puerta de Hierro | (Spain) Amalia López Dóriga | | | |
| 1926 | Puerta de Hierro | Eielen Cowirick | | | |
| 1925 | Puerta de Hierro | Eileen Cowirick | | | |
| 1924 | Puerta de Hierro | Mme. De Zia Bey | | | |
| 1923 | Puerta de Hierro | (Spain) Amalia López Dóriga | | | |
| 1922 | Puerta de Hierro | Condesa de Torre Hermosa | | | |
| 1921 | Puerta de Hierro | Condesa de Torre Hermosa | | | |
| 1920 | Puerta de Hierro | Marquesa de Villaviciosa | | | |
| 1919 | Puerta de Hierro | Mrs. Buring | | | |
| 1918 | Puerta de Hierro | Mrs. Buring | | | |
| 1917 | Puerta de Hierro | Marquesa de Villaviciosa | | | |
| 1916 | Puerta de Hierro | Marquesa de Almohacid | | | |
| 1915 | Puerta de Hierro | Mme. De Viegue | | | |
| 1914 | No tournament | | | | |
| 1913 | Madrid Polo Golf | Elena de Potestad | | | |
| 1912 | Madrid Polo Golf | Elena de Potestad | | | |
| 1911 | Madrid Polo Golf | Elena de Potestad | | | |
