= 2025 Espirito Santo Trophy =

Team golf tournament

Tournament information
- Dates: 1–4 October 2025
- Location: Singapore; 1°20′N 103°59′E
- Course: Tanah Merah Country Club (Tampines Course)
- Organized by: International Golf Federation
- Format: 72 holes stroke play

Statistics
- Par: 72
- Length: 7,024 yards (6,423 m)
- Field: 36 teams 108 players

Champion
- United States; Megha Ganne, Farah O'Keefe, Catherine Park
- 558 (−18)

Location map
- Location in Southeast Asia Location south of Malaysia Location in Singapore

The 2025 Espirito Santo Trophy took place 1–4 October at Tanah Merah Country Club (Tampines Course) in Singapore. It was the 31st women's golf World Amateur Team Championship for the Espirito Santo Trophy.

Team United States won the trophy for their 15th title.

Tied silver medalists team Spain and defending champion team South Korea, had the same total score, but United States was declared the winner. The initial tiebreaker, the final round non-counting score of the respective teams, was in the favor of United States and Spain, both with 71. Catherine Park, who as an alternate, shortly before the tournament, replaced world amateur number one Kiara Romero in the United States team, sank an 8-foot birdie putt on the 72nd hole to match the fourth round non-counting score of Spain's Carolina López-Chacarra.

The deciding tiebreaker came to be the lowest non-counting round in the third round, where United States' Megha Ganne shot 72 against 73 by Spain's Andrea Revuelta. This was the fourth time in the history of the championship, the winner was decided after a tie. Last time, in 2022, Sweden won the championship in a similar way.

Although there was no official recognition, Ying Xu, China, had the low individual score at 13-under-par 275, four strokes ahead of nearest competitors.

== Format ==
The tournament was a 72-hole stroke play team event. Each team of three players played four rounds. The best two scores for each team each round counted towards the team total.

== Venue ==
Since the first course of the Tanah Merah Country Club was opened in 1984, the club had hosted the Singapore Open on the PGA Tour of Australasia, the Johnnie Walker Classic on the European Tour and the HSBC Women's Champions on the LPGA Tour. The second course of the club, the Tampines Course, was planned and build shortly after the first course, opened in 1988, and redeveloped in 2017 by Phil Jacobs Design.

=== Course layout ===
Tee location on each hole varies so specified hole length is approximate.

Hole	Meters	Par	Hole	Meters	Par
1	336	4	10	532	5
2	440	4	11	361	4
3	378	4	12	368	4
4	190	3	13	361	4
5	545	5	14	157	3
6	137	3	15	420	4
7	377	4	16	126	3
8	501	5	17	370	4
9	286	4	18	538	5
Out	3190	36	In	3,233	36
Source:		Total		6,423	72

== Teams ==
36 teams entered the event. Each team had three players.

Country	Players
Australia	Raegan Denton, Jasmine Roberts, Ella Scaysbrook
Belgium	Sophie Bert, Savannah De Bock, Céline Manche
Brazil	Valentina Bosselmann, Lauren Grinberg, Maria Eduarda Rocha
Canada	Vanessa Borovilos, Lauren Kim, Michelle Xing
Chile	Florencia Dufey, Agustina Gómez, Antonia Matte
China	Shiyuan Zhou, Yijia Ren, Ying Xu
Colombia	Maria Isabella Errichetto, Silvia Garces, Catalina Monroy
Czech Republic	Veronika Kedronova, Anna Ludvová, Natálie Saint Germain
Denmark	Benedicte Brent-Petersen, Emma Kaisa Bunch, Marie Eline Madsen
England	Nellie Ong, Annabel Peaford, Patience Rhodes
France	Sara Brentcheneff, Valentine Delon, Constance Fouillet
Germany	Charlotte Back, Chiara Horder, Paula Schulz-Hanssen
Guam	Tyanna Jacot, Mina Manibusan, Nalathai Vongjalorn
Hong Kong	Hei Tung Leung, Elin Wang, Hoi Ching Sabrina Wong
Ireland	Beth Coulter, Aine Donegan, Emma Fleming
Italy	Natalia Aparicio, Francesca Fiorellini, Matilde Partele
Japan	Anna Iwanaga, Aira Nagasawa, Mamika Shinchi
Kenya	Ashley Awuor, Kellie Gachaga, Kanana Muthomi
Malaysia	Charlayne Shin Ling Chong, Jeneath Wong, Foong Zi Yu
Mexico	Maria Jose Barragan, Alexis Lamadrid, Alexa Saldaña
Morocco	Sofia Cherif Essakali, Maria Harrouch, Rim Imni
Netherlands	Rosanne Boere, Anne-Sterre den Dunnen, Hester Sicking
New Zealand	Eunseo Choi, Vivian Lu, Emma Zheng
Norway	Sofie Engeseth, Silje Torvund Ohma, Henriette Stranda
Peru	Luisamariana Mesones, Aitana Tuesta, Camila Zignaigo
Philippines	Junia Louise Gabasa, Rianne Malixi, Grace Pauline Quintanilla
Scotland	Abigail May, Freya Russell, Jennifer Saxton
Singapore	Valencia Chang, Xingtong Chen, Inez Ng
South Africa	Bobbi Brown, Megan Streicher, Kyra van Kan
South Korea	Oh Soo-min, Park Seo-jin, Sung A-jin
Spain	Andrea Revuelta, Carolina López-Chacarra, Paula Martín Sampedro
Sweden	Meja Örtengren, Kajsalotta Svarvar, Moa Svedenskiöld
Chinese Taipei	Yu-Chu Chen, Huai Chien Hsu, Hsin Chun Liao
Thailand	Kritchanya Kaopattanaskul, Prim Prachnakorn, Pimpisa Rubrong
United States	Megha Ganne, Farah O'Keefe, Catherine Park
Vietnam	Chuc An Le, Nguyen Minh Anh Le, Viet Gia Han Nguyen

== Results ==
Team standings
Place	Country	Score	To par
1st place, gold medalist(s)	United States*	136-141-142-139=558	−18
2nd place, silver medalist(s)	South Korea	137-138-141-142=558	−18
2nd place, silver medalist(s)	Spain	139-138-143-138=558	−18
T4	England	141-141-139-139=560	−16
T4	China	141-140-139-140=560	−16
6	Sweden	142-139-144-136=561	−14
T7	France	145-142-137-142=566	−10
T7	Philippines	145-148-137-136=566	−10
9	Denmark	144-143-136-135=568	−8
10	Canada	142-143-140-144=569	−7
11	Czech Republic	151-141-134-144=570	−6
12	Japan	142-141-142-146=571	−5
13	Australia	141-142-143-143=569	−4
14	Hong Kong	145-142-140-147=574	−2
15	Ireland	148-144-139-144=575	−1
16	Singapore	147-143-143-143=576	E
17	Italy	149-140-142-147=578	+2
18	Mexico	145-146-144-144=579	+3
19	Malaysia	148-142-144-146=580	+4
20	Thailand	142-147-148-145=582	+6
21	New Zealand	150-141-144-149=584	+8
21	Germany	147-143-145-149=584	+8
21	Netherlands	146-145-141-152=584	+8
24	South Africa	147-148-145-145=585	+9
25	Norway	149-148-147-148=592	+16
T26	Belgium	150-147-148-148=593	+17
T26	Chile	150-147-148-148=593	+17
T26	Chinese Taipei	148-144-148-153=593	+17
29	Colombia	153-143-149-151=596	+20
30	Morocco	153-152-144-151=600	+24
31	Scotland	157-149-149-147=602	+26
32	Peru	151-150-154-151=604	+28
33	Brazil	153-156-153-156=618	+42
34	Vietnam	156-156-161-155=628	+52
35	Kenya	164-158-157-166=635	+59
36	Guam	176-165-163-165=669	+93

* United States was awarded the tiebreak, since their third player had a lower score than South Korea's third player and was tied with Spain's third player in the final round and had a lower score than Spain's third player in the third round.

Individual leaders
Place	Player	Country	Score	To par
1	Ying Xu	China	70-70-68-67=275	−13
T2	Paula Martín Sampedro	Spain	71-67-72-69=279	−9
T2	Rianne Malixi	Philippines	70-72-67-70=279	−9
T2	Oh Soo-min	South Korea	68-69-73-69=279	−9
T5	Nellie Ong	England	69-74-69-69=281	−7
T5	Meja Örtengren	Sweden	70-71-70-70=281	−7
T5	Aira Nagasawa	Japan	68-69-72-72=281	−7
T5	Catherine Park	United States	71-68-71-71=281	−7
T5	Annabel Peaford	England	72-69-70-70=281	−7
T5	Andrea Revuelta	Spain	68-71-73-69=281	−7

Note: There was no official award for the lowest individual scores.

== See also ==
- 2025 Eisenhower Trophy, the men's golf World Amateur Team Championship
