= Beth Coulter =

Irish professional golfer (born 2004

Personal information
- Nationality: Ireland
- Born: 15 March 2004 (age 22) Dundonald, County Down, Northern Ireland
- Height: 5 ft 4 in (163 cm)

Career
- Sport: Golf
- College: Arizona State University
- Turned professional: 2026
- Current tour: LET Access Series (joined 2026)
- Professional wins: 1

Beth Coulter (born 15 March 2004) is a Northern Ireland-born professional golfer representing Ireland.

== Amateur career ==
Coulter started playing golf at the age of ten at Kirkistown Castle Golf Club in County Down. She played college golf for Arizona State University 2022–2026 after being the number seven recruit in the US. She finished as the silver medalist at both the 2023 Pac-12 and 2025 Big-12 Conference Championships, and helped Arizona State to advance to two-straight NCAA Championships.

In 2021, she came in second at the Irish Women's Amateur Close Championship and won the tournament in 2022 at the Tramore Golf Club. In 2021, she also was the runner-up at the R&A's Girls Amateur Championship, the first Irish player since 1980 to reach the final.

In 2022, Coulter competed in the World Amateur Team Championship for the Espirito Santo Trophy and the European Ladies' Team Championship.

In 2023, Coulter came in second at the Irish Women's & Girls Open Stroke Play Championship. She also finished second at the 2023 Irish Women's Amateur Close Championship. In 2023, Coulter reached the quarter finals of the Women's Amateur Championship and finished eighth at the European Ladies Amateur Championship.

== Professional career ==
Coulter turned professional in July 2026. She won in her professional debut at the Women's Irish Challenge on the LET Access Series.

In her second appearance, she almost clinched her second title at the CSK Steel Women's Open in Denmark, but lost in a dramatic three-way playoff.

== Amateur wins ==
- 2019 Munster Women & Girls Senior Open Championship, Irish Girls Close Championship
- 2021 Irish Girls Close Championship
- 2022 Irish Women's Amateur Close Championship, Irish Girls Close Championship

== Professional wins (1) ==
=== LET Access Series wins (1) ===
No.	Date	Tournament	Winning score	To par	Margin of victory	Runner-up
1	31 Jul 2026	Women's Irish Challenge	74-67-70=211	−5	Playoff	(South Korea) Yang Aye-on

LET Access Series playoff record (1–1)

No.	Year	Tournament	Opponent(s)	Result
1	2026	Women's Irish Challenge	(South Korea) Yang Aye-on	Won with birdie on first extra hole
2	2026	CSK Steel Women's Open	(Germany) Lena Geier (a) (Sweden) Moa Svedenskiöld	Svedenskiöld won with par on fourth extra hole Geier eliminated with bogey on first extra hole

== Team appearances ==
- European Girls' Team Championship (representing Ireland): 2018, 2019
- Girls Home Internationals (representing Ireland): 2018, 2019
- Junior Vagliano Trophy (representing Great Britain & Ireland): 2019
- European Ladies' Team Championship (representing Ireland): 2021, 2022, 2023, 2024, 2025, 2026
- Women's Home Internationals (representing Ireland): 2021
- Women's and Men's Home Internationals (representing Ireland): 2022, 2023, 2024 (winners), 2025
- Vagliano Trophy (representing Great Britain & Ireland): 2023, 2025 (winners)
- Patsy Hankins Trophy (representing Europe): 2023 (winners), 2025
- Espirito Santo Trophy (representing Ireland): 2023, 2025
- Curtis Cup (representing the Great Britain & Ireland): 2024 (winners), 2026
- Spirit International Amateur (representing Ireland): 2024
