= Cayetana Fernández =

Spanish professional golfer

Personal information
- Full name: Cayetana Fernández García-Poggio
- Nationality: Spain
- Born: 2005 (age 20–21) Madrid, Spain

Career
- Sport: Golf
- College: Texas A&M University
- Status: Amateur

Cayetana Fernández García-Poggio (born 2005) is a Spanish amateur golfer. In 2022, she won the Spanish Ladies Amateur, the World Junior Girls Championship and the Junior Golf World Cup.

== Amateur career ==
Fernández was born in Madrid in 2005 and enjoyed an impressive amateur career, winning the European Girls' Team Championship, the Junior Vagliano Trophy and the Junior Solheim Cup in 2021.

In 2022, she won the Spanish International Ladies Amateur Championship, and was runner-up at the Girls Amateur Championship at Carnoustie Golf Links, behind Lottie Woad. She won the Junior Golf World Cup in Japan both with Spain and individually, and repeated the performance at the World Junior Girls Championship in Canada.

Fernández made two appearances on the 2022 Ladies European Tour, and tied for 3rd at the Madrid Ladies Open behind Ana Peláez and Linnea Ström. She led the LET season finale, the Andalucia Costa Del Sol Open De España, at the halfway point, ultimately finishing tied 5th, 3 strokes behind winner Caroline Hedwall.

In 2023, she lost a playoff to Rocío Tejedo at the Portuguese International Ladies Amateur Championship, and recorded the second best individual score at the 2023 Espirito Santo Trophy in Abu Dhabi.

Fernández enrolled at Texas A&M University in 2023 and started playing with the Texas A&M Aggies women's golf team, where she produced the second-lowest stroke average for a freshman in program history and was named to the SEC All-Freshman Team.

== Personal life ==
Fernández has two sisters that are also accomplished golfers. Her older sister Blanca is a member of the Ladies European Tour and played college golf with the Texas A&M Aggies women's golf team 2019–2024.

== Amateur wins ==
- 2019 Campeonato Norte Sub 25
- 2021 Copa Federacion Riojana de Golf, Campeonato de Espana Amateur III Memorial Emma Villacieros
- 2022 Spanish International Ladies Amateur Championship, Junior Golf World Cup (individual), World Junior Girls Championship (individual)
- 2024 Charles Schwab Women's Collegiate
- 2025 The "Mo" Morial, The Carmel Cup

== Team appearances ==
Amateur

- Junior Vagliano Trophy (representing Europe): 2021 (winners)
- Junior Solheim Cup (representing Europe): 2021 (winners)
- European Girls' Team Championship (representing Spain): 2021 (winners), 2022
- Espirito Santo Trophy (representing Spain): 2022, 2023
- World Junior Girls Championship (representing Spain): 2022 (winners)
- Junior Golf World Cup (representing Spain): 2022 (winners)
- European Ladies' Team Championship (representing Spain): 2023, 2024, 2025 (winners), 2026 (winners)
- Spirit International Amateur (representing Spain): 2024
- Vagliano Trophy (representing the Continent of Europe): 2025
- Arnold Palmer Cup (representing the International team): 2026 (winners)
