= Portuguese International Ladies Amateur Championship =

Portuguese Ladies Amateur
Tournament information
- Location: Portugal
- Course: Penina Golf Resort
- Organised by: Portuguese Golf Federation
- Format: 72-hole Stroke play
- Month played: January

Current champion
- (France) Louise Uma Landgraf

The Portuguese International Ladies Amateur Championship is an annual amateur golf tournament in Portugal for women.

It is an "A" rated tournament in the World Amateur Golf Ranking. The tournament is a qualifying event for the European teams in the Junior Ryder Cup and Junior Solheim Cup, and as such typically features one of the stronger international fields amongst the continental European amateur championships. The 2023 event was the 93nd installment.

== Winners ==
Year	Venue	Champion	Score	Runner(s)-up	Ref
2026	Penina Golf Resort	(France) Louise Uma Landgraf	1 stroke	(Czech Republic) Anna Ludvova (Finland) June Weckman	
2025	Penina Golf Resort	(France) Louise Uma Landgraf	2 strokes	(France) Sara Brentcheneff	
2024	Penina Golf Resort	(Germany) Helen Briem	4 strokes	(Sweden) Moa Stridh	
2023	Montado Golf Resort	(Spain) Rocío Tejedo	Playoff	(Spain) Cayetana Fernández García-Poggio	
2022	Montado Golf Resort	(Italy) Francesca Fiorellini	3 strokes	(France) Maylis Lamoure	
2021	Montado Golf Resort	(France) Lucie Malchirand	4 strokes	(France) Vairana Heck	
2020	Montado Golf Resort	(Italy) Alessia Nobilio	8 strokes	(Spain) Carolina López-Chacarra Coto	
2019	Montado Golf Resort	(France) Pauline Roussin-Bouchard	2 strokes	(France) Lucie Malchirand	
2018	West Cliffs	(England) Isobel Wardle	Playoff	(England) Annabell Fuller	
2017	Montado Golf Resort	(Italy) Letizia Bagnoli	3 strokes	(Denmark) Line Toft Hansen	
2016	Montado Golf Resort	(Spain) Maria Parra Luque	9 strokes	(Switzerland) Albane Valenzuela	
2015	Montado Golf Resort	(Germany) Olivia Cowan	1 stroke	(Spain) Nuria Iturrios (Germany) Amina Wolf	
2014	Montado Golf Resort	(Spain) Silvia Banon Ibanez	1 stroke	(England) Gabriella Cowley	
2013	Montado Golf Resort	(Spain) Clara Baena	2 strokes	(Germany) Karolin Lampert (Finland) Matilda Castren	
2012	Montado Golf Resort	(Germany) Roberta Roeller	3 strokes	(Republic of Ireland) Leona Maguire	
2011	Aroeira Golf Club	(Republic of Ireland) Leona Maguire	15 strokes	(Netherlands) Karlijn Zaanen (Germany) Karolin Lampert	
2010	Oceânico O'Connor	(Spain) Anna Arrese	1 stroke	(Germany) Lara Katzy	
2009	Quinta do Perú	(France) Rosanna Crépiat	1 stroke	(France) Lucie André	
2008	Benamor	(Spain) Carlota Ciganda	8 strokes	(England) Florentyna Parker	
2007	Quinta de Cima	(England) Holly Aitchinson	3 & 2	(Germany) Nicola Roessler	
2006	Porto Santo	(Spain) Marta Silva			
2005	Estela Golf Club				
2004	Quinta de Cima				
2003					
2002					
2001					
2000					
1999		(Spain) Nuria Clau			
1998					
1997		(Spain) Ana Belén Sánchez			
1996					
1995		(Spain) Dolores Cortezo			
1994					
1993		(Spain) Marina Arruti			
1992		(Spain) Laura Navarro			
1991		T. Abecassis			
1990		(Spain) Sonia Navarro			
1989		S. Clauset			
1988		(Sweden) Helene Andersson			
1987		(Spain) Mary Carmen Navarro			
1986		(Spain) Mary Carmen Navarro			
1985		(Spain) Tania Abitbol			
1984		(Spain) Macarena Campomanes			
1983		(England) Kitrina Douglas			
1982		(West Germany) Sabine Blecher			
1981		V. Dulout			
1980		(England) Carole Caldwell			
1979		(Wales) A. Gale			
1978		(Wales) A. Gale			
1977		(Wales) A. Gale			
1976		E. Braito			
1975		C. Marcusson			
1974		C. Mackintosh			
1973		(Wales) A. Gale			
1972	Estoril	(England) Mickey Walker	3 & 2	(Portugal) Barbara de Brito e Cunha	
1971	Estoril	(Portugal) Vera Lennox	8 & 7	Angeles Bastos	
1970	Estoril	(England) Pam Tredinnick	3 & 2	Mrs. Beryl Green	
1969	Estoril	(Portugal) Vera Lennox	3 & 1	(Wales) A. Gale	
1968	Estoril	Mrs. B. Green	8 & 7	Mrs. B. Hanbury	
1967	Estoril	(Sweden) Liv Forsell Wollin	10 & 9	(Portugal) Salette de Sousa e Melo	
1966	Estoril	(Italy) Vanda Rosa Bohus	5 & 4	(England) Elizabeth Fisher	
1965	Estoril	(Italy) Vanda Rosa Bohus	37th hole	(Portugal) Salette de Sousa e Melo	
1964	Estoril	(England) Elizabeth Fisher	8 & 7	R. Pilch	
1963	Estoril	(Portugal) Barbara de Brito e Cunha	3 & 2	(England) Veronica Beharrell	
1962	Estoril	(Spain) Ana Maria Marfull	1 hole	(South Africa) N. Rohm	
1961	Estoril	(Portugal) Barbara de Brito e Cunha	5 & 4	(Italy) Vanda Rosa Bohus	
1960	Estoril	(Scotland) Marjory Fowler	10 & 9	(Portugal) Barbara de Brito e Cunha	
1959	Estoril	(Portugal) Barbara de Brito e Cunha	5 & 4	(Portugal) Vera Nobre da Costa	
1958	Estoril	(Italy) Vanda Rosa Bohus	9 & 7	(Portugal) Vera Nobre da Costa	
1957	Estoril	(England) Angela Ward	8 & 6	(Portugal) Salette de Sousa e Melo	
1956	Estoril	(Italy) Vanda Rosa Bohus	1 hole	(Portugal) Barbara de Brito e Cunha	
1955	Estoril	(Italy) Vanda Rosa Bohus	7 & 5	Juana Couret	
1954	Estoril	(England) Jeanne Bisgood	9 & 7	(Belgium) Mlle Waucquez	
