= Junior Golf World Cup =

Toyota Junior Golf World Cup
Tournament information
- Location: Toyota City, Aichi, Japan
- Established: 1992
- Course: Chukyo Golf Club – Ishino Course
- Organized by: Chukyo TV Broadcasting; Junior Orange Bowl (Co-organizer); Japan Golf Association (Tournament Operation Committee)
- Format: 72-hole stroke play
- Month played: June

The Toyota Junior Golf World Cup (Japanese: 世界ジュニアゴルフ推進会) is a junior golf championship held each summer in Japan for national teams of golfers 18 and under from around the globe.

Qualifying events are held on six continents to determine the 12 boys’ teams and nine girls’ teams who compete for the annual championship. Chukyo Golf Club, outside Nagoya, has served as the host course for 16 of the past 17 editions.

Toyota has been the Junior Golf World Cup's title sponsor since 2002.

== History & Format ==
The Junior Golf World Cup, founded by Yasumasa Tagashira, Eiji Tagashira and William Kerdyk, was first contested in 1992. A total of 98 golfers from 14 nations competed at Taisha Country Club in Izumo.

The United States won the inaugural title, with Justin Roof the first medalist. Both would retain their crowns a year later. Host Japan claimed its first title in 1994, with a team that included future PGA Tour professional Ryuji Imada.

In 1997, the tournament expanded from a three-day event to four days. A girls’ division was added in 2014.

The tournament format is 72 holes of stroke play over four days, with two scores from each nation’s three-player roster counting toward the team total. Before 2024, boys’ rosters were made up of four players, with three scores counting.

Continental/regional qualifiers are held each winter and spring to determine the 21 teams that go to Japan. In all, more than 70 countries participate in the qualifying process.

== Future stars ==
The Toyota Junior Golf World Cup has featured such future major champions as Hideki Matsuyama, Jon Rahm, Scottie Scheffler, Cameron Smith, Justin Rose, Henrik Stenson, Trevor Immelman and Danny Willett. In 2001, South Africa won with a roster that included future major winners Louis Oosthuizen and Charl Schwartzel.

Viktor Hovland, who won the PGA Tour’s FedEx Cup in 2023, played the Toyota Junior World Cup three times from 2014-16. Other participants that have won PGA Tour, European Tour or LIV Golf events include Joaquín Niemann, Camilo Villegas, Russell Henley, Hunter Mahan, Satoshi Kodaira, Branden Grace, Im Sung-jae, Brendon de Jonge, Alex Norén, Ludvig Åberg and David Puig.

The girls’ division saw its first major champion when Japan's Ayaka Furue won the 2024 Evian Championship. In addition, three alumnae won the Augusta National Women's Amateur in consecutive years — Tsubasa Kajitani, Anna Davis and Rose Zhang.

Zhang, Linnea Ström and Mone Inami are LPGA tour winners, while Saki Baba captured the 2022 U.S. Women's Amateur.

Of the 60 men's golfers entered at the 2024 Paris Olympics, 40 had played in the Junior Golf World Cup.

== Results ==
=== Boys' tournament ===
Year	Team			Individual			Ref
Year	Gold	Silver	Bronze	Gold	Silver	Bronze	Ref
2026	Japan	Canada; United States		(Colombia) Tomás Restrepo	(South Africa) Roelof Craig	(Thailand) Settawut Kenanan (Canada) Austin Krahn	
2025	Japan	United States	France	(Colombia) Tomás Restrepo (Japan) Taisei Nagasaki		(United States) Brooks Simmons	
2024	South Korea	United States	Japan	(Japan) Mao Matsuyama	(United States) Billy Davis	(United States) William Jennings (South Korea) Kim Min-su (South Korea) Park Gun-woong	
2023	Japan	Canada	United States Germany	(Japan) Kaito Sato	(South Korea) Lee Jae-won	(United States) Billy Davis (Japan) Taishi Moto	
2022	Canada	Japan	Sweden	(Sweden) Albert Hansson	(Japan) Riura Matsui (Japan) Minato Oshima (Italy) Filippo Ponzano		
2021	Canceled due to the COVID-19 pandemic						
2020	Canceled due to the COVID-19 pandemic						
2019	South Africa	Japan	Spain	(South Africa) Samuel Simpson	(South Africa) Martin Vorster	(Canada) Christopher Vandette	
2018	Denmark	Spain	Thailand	(Denmark) Rasmus Højgaard	(Denmark) Nicolai Højgaard	(Sweden) Ludvig Åberg	
2017	United States	Japan	Thailand	(United States) Frankie Capan III	(Thailand) Kosuke Hamamoto	(Denmark) Gustav Frimodt	
2016	United States	Germany	Thailand	(Chile) Joaquín Niemann	(South Africa) Dylan Naidoo	(Germany) Max Schmitt (United States) Norman Xiong (Japan) Takumi Kanaya (Germany) Marc Hammer (Thailand) Sadom Kaewkajana	
2015	Japan	Sweden	South Korea	(Japan) Ren Okazaki	(Chile) Joaquín Niemann	(Japan) Takumi Kanaya (United States) Chandler Phillips (Sweden) Marcus Svensson	
2014	Norway	United States	Venezuela	(Venezuela) Jorge Garcia	(Australia) Brett Coletta	(Chile) Joaquín Niemann	
2013	Venezuela	Australia	Mexico	(Venezuela) Jorge Garcia	(Australia) Lucas Herbert	(South Africa) Thriston Lawrence	
2012	Australia	Japan	Canada	(Australia) Viraat Badhwar	(Japan) Jinichiro Kozuma	(Canada) Adam Svensson	
2011	Canceled due to the 2011 Tōhoku earthquake and tsunami						
2010	Japan	United States	Canada	(Canada) Corey Connors (Japan) Yosuke Asaji (Denmark) Lucas Bjerregaard			
2009	Argentina	United States	England	(South Korea) Lee Kyoung-hoon	(Argentina) Tommy Cocha (Japan) Tomohiro Umeyama (Mexico) Santiago Gavino		
2008	Norway	Sweden	Australia	(United States) Bud Cauley (Norway) Anders Kristiansen		(Sweden) Pontus Gad	
2007	Sweden	Norway	Australia	(Norway) Anders Kristiansen	(Chinese Taipei) Pan Cheng-tsung	(Sweden) Björn Åkesson (Sweden) Jesper Kennegård	
2006	Norway	Sweden	Japan	(Norway) Marius Thorp	(Japan) Naoto Nakanishi (Sweden) Björn Åkesson		
2005	United States	Colombia	England	(United States) Erik Flores	(Japan) Yuki Usami	(Colombia) Andrés Echevarría	
2004	United States	South Africa	Spain	(South Africa) Matthew Kent	(Argentina) Estanislao Goya (Spain) Pablo Martín (United States) Garrett Sapp		
2003	South Korea	Japan	Spain	(Japan) Yuta Ikeda	(Japan) Daisuke Yasumoto	(Spain) Pablo Martín	
2002	England	Sweden	New Zealand	(England) Matthew Richardson	(United States) Henry Liaw	(New Zealand) Sung Yong Lee	
2001	South Africa	New Zealand	United States	(New Zealand) Sung Yong Lee	(Japan) Takamasa Yamamoto (Thailand) Prom Meesawat		
2000	United States	South Africa	England	(United States) Hunter Mahan (Japan) Kodai Ichihara		(Canada) Matt McQuillan (New Zealand) Sung Yong Lee	
1999	England	United States	Canada	(England) Nick Dougherty	(South Korea) Kim Dae-sub	(United States) Jason Hartwick	
1998	England	Japan	United States	(Argentina) Rafael Echenique	(England) Adam Frayne	(Zimbabwe) Travis Fraser	
1997	United States	Japan	England	(United States) David Gossett	(South Korea) Park Sung-soo	(England) Phillip Rowe	
1996	Japan	England	Scotland	(United States) Sal Spallone	(Japan) Keizo Yoshida	(Japan) Yūsaku Miyazato	
1995	United States	Sweden	Canada	(United States) Joel Kribel	(Sweden) Joakim Bäckström	(Japan) Yumihiko Hatone	
1994	Japan	Canada	Spain	(Canada) Rob McMillan	(Japan) Go Higaki	(Spain) Ivó Giner	
1993	United States	Sweden	South Korea	(United States) Justin Roof	(Sweden) Johan Edfors (United States) Will Garner		
1992	United States	Sweden	South Korea	(United States) Justin Roof	(Venezuela) Juan Nutt	(United States) Brian Newton	

=== Girls' tournament ===
Year	Team			Individual			Ref
Year	Gold	Silver	Bronze	Gold	Silver	Bronze	Ref
2026	South Korea	Japan; Thailand		(Japan) Anna Iwanaga	(South Korea) Park Seo-jin	(South Korea) Song Ji-min	
2025	Thailand	Japan	United States	(Japan) Mamika Shinchi	(Thailand) Kritchanya Kaopattanaskul	(Canada) Shauna Liu	
2024	United States	Thailand	Japan	(United States) Jasmine Koo	(Japan) Mamika Shinchi	(Australia) Sarah Hammett (Thailand) Pimpisa Rubrong	
2023	Japan	United States	South Korea	(Japan) Yuna Araki	(United States) Anna Davis (South Korea) An Yeon-ju		
2022	Spain	Japan	Canada	(Spain) Andrea Revuelta (Spain) Cayetana Fernández		(Japan) Miku Ueta	
2021	Canceled due to the COVID-19 pandemic						
2020	Canceled due to the COVID-19 pandemic						
2019	Japan	Mexico	United States	(Mexico) Cory Lopez (United States) Rose Zhang (Australia) Cassie Porter			
2018	Japan	South Korea	Sweden	(Japan) Yuka Yasuda (South Korea) Lee Su-jeong		(Japan) Yuna Nishimura	
2017	United States	Japan	Australia	(Malaysia) Alyaa Abdulghany	(Japan) Yuna Nishimura	(United States) Emilia Migliaccio	
2016	United States	Japan	Spain	(United States) Kristen Gillman	(Japan) Mone Inami	(Japan) Riri Sadoyama (Malaysia) Alyaa Abdulghany	
2015	Japan	South Korea	Mexico	(Japan) Yumi Matsubara (South Korea) Jo Hyun-kyung		(Japan) Minami Hiruta	
2014	Japan	South Korea	Sweden	(South Korea) Kim So-jung	(Sweden) Linnea Ström	(Japan) Mizuho Konishi	

== Results summary ==
=== Boys' tournament ===
Country	Win	2nd	3rd	Total
United States	9	7	3	19
Japan	7	7	2	16
England	3	1	4	8
Norway	3	1	–	4
South Africa	2	2	–	4
South Korea	2	–	3	5
Sweden	1	7	1	9
Canada	1	3	4	8
Australia	1	1	2	4
Venezuela	1	–	1	2
Argentina	1	–	–	1
Denmark	1	–	–	1
Spain	–	1	4	5
New Zealand	–	1	1	2
Germany	–	1	1	2
Colombia	–	1	–	1
Thailand	–	–	3	3
Mexico	–	–	1	1
Scotland	–	–	1	1
France	–	–	1	1
Total	32	33	32	

=== Girls' tournament ===
Country	Win	2nd	3rd	Total
Japan	5	5	1	11
United States	3	1	2	6
South Korea	1	3	1	5
Thailand	1	2	–	3
Spain	1	–	1	2
Mexico	–	1	1	2
Sweden	–	–	2	2
Australia	–	–	1	1
Canada	–	–	1	1
Total	11	12	10	

== See also ==
- World Junior Girls Golf Championship
