= European Girls' Team Championship =

The European Girls' Team Championship is a European amateur team golf championship for women up to 18 organised by the European Golf Association. The inaugural event was held in 1991. It was played in odd-numbered years from 1991 to 1999 and has been played annually since 1999.

Since the European Lady Junior's Team Championship for women under 22, was discontinued in 2006, due to the trend of players reaching elite level at an earlier age, the European Girls' Team Championship has been regarded as the most important junior team event in Europe outside the British Isles.

Many female European players on the world's leading professional golf tours have played in the event during their early careers. This include (as of August 2023) every European winner of LPGA Tour tournaments from 2014 except one (Suzann Pettersen, Anna Nordqvist, Caroline Masson, Carlota Ciganda, Charley Hull, Pernilla Lindberg, Georgia Hall, Céline Boutier, Madelene Sagström, Sophia Popov, Mel Reid, Matilda Castren, Leona Maguire, Nanna Koerstz Madsen, Maja Stark, Jodi Ewart Shadoff and Linn Grant and also American Jessica Korda representing the Czech Republic).

The championship is a counting event for Junior Solheim Cup qualification.

== Format ==
The championship can be contested by women aged 18 years old or younger.

The format consists of 20 teams, each of 6 players, competing in two rounds of stroke play, out of which the five lowest scores from each team's six players will count each day. The total addition of the five lowest scores will constitute the team's score and determine which team is qualified for the last three rounds of match play.

Only teams in contention for a medal will play a match format of two foursomes and five singles, while the other teams will play a one foursome and four singles match format.

Up to and including 2010, each team consisted of four players. The 2020 event took place in a reduced format, with four players in each team, due to the COVID-19 pandemic.

== Results ==
Year and course		Location	Gold	Silver	Bronze
2026	Golf & Country Club Zürich	Switzerland	Spain	England	France
2025	Slaley Hall	England	Spain	Italy	Ireland
2024	Göteborg Golf Club	Sweden	England	Germany	Italy
2023	Hossegor Golf Club	France	Spain	Italy	Netherlands
2022	Oddur Golf Club	Iceland	France	Sweden	Germany
2021	Montado Golf Resort	Portugal	Spain	France	Sweden
2020	Green Resort Hrubá Borša	Slovakia	Germany	Sweden	Netherlands
2019	Parador de El Saler	Spain	Denmark	Spain	Italy
2018	Forsgården Golf Club	Sweden	Italy	Spain	Sweden
2017	St Laurence Golf	Finland	Sweden	Italy	England
2016	Oslo GC	Norway	Italy	Sweden	Spain
2015	Golf Resort Kaskada	Czech Republic	Spain	Italy	Austria
2014	Golf Resort Skalica	Slovakia	France	Italy	Sweden
2013	Linköping Golf Club	Sweden	Sweden	France	Spain
2012	GC St. Leon-Rot	Germany	Sweden	Spain	Denmark
2011	Is Molas	Italy	France	England	Spain
2010	Aalborg GC	Denmark	France	Ireland	Spain
2009	Kokkola GC	Finland	Ireland	Sweden	Spain
2008	Murcar GC	Scotland	Sweden	England	Netherlands
2007	Oslo GC	Norway	Sweden	Netherlands	Denmark
2006	Esbjerg GC	Denmark	Germany	Spain	Denmark
2005	Lucerne GC	Switzerland	England	Sweden	Wales
2004	Le Golf National	France	Sweden	France	Sweden
2003	Esbjerg GC	Denmark	Spain	Sweden	Norway
2002	Torino GC	Italy	Spain	Sweden	Austria
2001	Oporto GC	Portugal	Spain	Sweden	France
2000	Stockholm GC	Sweden	Sweden	Switzerland	Finland
1999	Katinkulta GC	Finland	Germany	Italy	England
1997	Frankfurter GC	Germany	Spain	Germany	Italy
1995	GC Grand-Ducal	Luxembourg	Sweden	Italy	Spain
1993	Malaga GC	Spain	Spain	France	Denmark
1991	Hulta GC	Sweden	Spain	Sweden	France

== Medalling nations' summary ==
Rank	Nation	Gold	Silver	Bronze	Total
1	Spain (ESP)	11	4	6	21
2	Sweden (SWE)	8	9	4	21
3	France (FRA)	4	4	3	11
4	Germany (GER)	3	2	1	6
5	Italy (ITA)	2	7	3	12
6	England (ENG)	2	3	2	7
7	Ireland (IRL)	1	1	1	3
8	Denmark (DNK)	1	0	4	5
9	Netherlands (NED)	0	1	3	4
10	Switzerland (CHE)	0	1	0	1
11	Austria (AUT)	0	0	2	2
12	Finland (FIN)	0	0	1	1
12	Norway (NOR)	0	0	1	1
12	Wales (WAL)	0	0	1	1
Totals (14 entries)		32	32	32	96

== Winning teams ==
- 2026: Spain: Adriana García, Carlota López, Nagore Martínez, Carolina Pérez-Tasso, Amanda Revuelta, Ángela Revuelta
- 2025: Spain: Adriana García, Aroa González, Lucía Iraola, Nagore Martínez, Amanda Revuelta, Liz Siyu Hao
- 2023: Spain: Cloe Amión, Anna Cañadó, Alba González, Paula Martín Sampedro, Andrea Revuelta, Rocío Tejedo
- 2022: France: Ines Archer, Maylis Lamoure, Constance Fouillet, Vairana Heck, Nastasia Nadaud, Carla de Troia
- 2021: Spain: Paula Balanzategui, Cayetana Fernández, Julia López Ramírez, Lucía López Ortega, Paula Martín Sampedro, Andrea Revuelta
- 2020: Germany: Charlotte Back, Chiara Horder, Paula Schulz-Hanssen, Sophie Witt
- 2019: Denmark: Natacha Husted, Alberte Thuesen, Amalie Leth-Nissen, Cecilie Leth-Nissen, Anne Norman, Olivia Grønborg
- 2018: Italy: Alessia Nobilio, Virginia Bossi, Emilie Alba Paltrinieri, Benedetta Moresco, Anna Zanusso, Caterina Don
- 2017: Sweden: Frida Kinhult, Beatrice Wallin, Maja Stark, Julia Engström, Amanda Linnér, Linn Grant
- 2016: Italy: Caterina Don, Angelica Moresco, Alessandra Fanali, Clara Manzalini, Alessia Nobilio, Emilie Alba Paltrinieri
- 2015: Spain: Ana Peláez, María Herraez Galvez, Marta Perez Sanmartin, María Parra, Paz Marfa Sans, Elena Hualde Zuniga
- 2014: France: Mathilda Cappeliez, Elisabeth Codet, Eva Gilly, Agathe Laisné, Lauralie Migneaux, Marion Veysseyre
- 2013: Sweden: Linn Andersson, Martina Edberg, Mia Landegren, Linnea Ström, Emma Svensson, Jessica Vasilic
- 2012: Sweden: Linn Andersson, Isabella Deilert, Mia Landegren, Linnea Ström, Emma Nilsson, Elsa Westin
- 2011: France: Emilie Alonso, Shannon Aubert, Céline Boutier, Laure Castelain, Perrine Delacour, Manon Gidali
- 2010: France: Alexandra Bonetti, Céline Boutier, Léa Charpier, Manon Gidali
- 2009: Ireland: Leona Maguire, Lisa Maguire, Laura McCarthy, Stephanie Medow
- 2008: Sweden: Josephine Janson, Johanna Tillström, Louise Larsson, Amanda Sträng
- 2007: Sweden: Caroline Hedwall, Nathalie Månsson, Jacqueline Hedwall, Anna Dahlberg-Söderström
- 2006: Germany: Pia Hallbig, Caroline Masson, Nicola Rössler, Valerie Sternebeck
- 2005: England: Jodi Ewart, Kiran Matharu, Mel Reid, Emma Sheffield
- 2004: Sweden: Pernilla Lindberg, Caroline Westrup, Linn Gustafsson, Mikaela Bäcktstedt
- 2003: Spain: Azahara Muñoz, Belén Mozo, Emma Cabrera-Bello, Ana Sanzó-Rubert
- 2002: Spain: María Hernández, Azahara Muñoz, María Recasens, Adriana Zwanck
- 2001: Spain: Immaculada de la Lama, Lucia Mar, Elisa Serramià, Azahara Muñoz,
- 2000: Sweden: Eva Bjärvall, Josefin Gustavsson, Golda Johansson, Karin Sjödin
- 1999: Germany: Silke Braunschweig, Bettina Hauert, Jessica Issler, Denise Simon
- 1997: Spain: María Beautell, Nuria Clau, María Gaccia-Estrada, Paula Marti
- 1995: Sweden: Anna Becker, Marie Hedberg, Jessica Krantz, Eva-Lotta Strömlid
- 1993: Spain: Alexandra Armas, Sara Beautell, Iciar Elguezabal, Ana Belén Sánchez
- 1991: Spain: Laura Navarro, Mabel Pascual del Pobil, María José Pons, Vanessa Vignali

== See also ==
- European Lady Junior's Team Championship – discontinued amateur team golf championship for women under 22 played 1968–2006 organized by the European Golf Association
- European Ladies' Team Championship – amateur team golf championship for women organized by the European Golf Association.
- European Ladies Amateur Championship – individual golf championship organized by the European Golf Association.
- European Boys' Team Championship – amateur team golf championship for men up to 18 organized by the European Golf Association
