= Swedish International (women) =

Women's golf tournament

Swedish International Stroke Play Championship
Tournament information
- Location: Sweden
- Established: 1962
- Tour(s): Swedish Golf Tour (1986–2007; 2025–); LET Access Series (2025–)
- Format: Stroke play
- Prize fund: €50,000

Current champion
- (Norway) Silje Torvund Ohma

The Swedish International Stroke Play Championship or Swedish International (SI) was a women's golf tournament played in Sweden from 1962 to 2007. It featured on the Swedish Golf Tour starting from the tour's inception in 1986.

Named Svenskt Internationellt Slagtävlingsmästerskap (SISM) until it formally assumed the name Swedish International in 1984, the tournament was amateur only from 1962 to 1983, turning open to amateurs and professionals alike from 1984 with the introduction of the men's Swedish Golf Tour. Officially a Swedish National Championship starting in 1982, a separate National Champion was named in the event of a foreign winner. The tournament was discontinued after the 2007 season.

In 2025, the Swedish Strokeplay Championship returned to the Swedish Golf Tour, with co-sanction by the LET Access Series. This incarnation of the tournament is not a national championship.

== Winners ==
Year	Tournament name	Venue	Winner	Score	Margin of victory	Runner(s)-up	Purse (SEK)	Ref
Swedish Strokeplay Championship
2026	Swedish Strokeplay Championship	Uppsala Söderby	(Norway) Silje Torvund Ohma	213 (−6)	2 strokes	(Denmark) Cecilie Leth-Nissen	€50,000	
2025	Swedish Strokeplay Championship	Uppsala Söderby	(Sweden) Andrea Lignell	213 (−6)	1 stroke	(Iceland) Ragga Kristinsdóttir	€45,000	
2008–2024: No tournament
Swedish International Stroke Play Championship
2007	Gefle Ladies Open	Gävle	(Sweden) Caroline Hedwall (a)	215 (−1)	Playoff	(Switzerland) Florence Lüscher	200,000	
2006	Körunda Ladies Club SGT Open	Nynäshamn	(Sweden) Christine Hallström	211 (−5)	2 strokes	(Sweden) Sara Wikström	225,000	
2005	Swedish International	Vidbynäs	(Sweden) Anna Tybring	222 (+3)	3 strokes	(Sweden) Anna Becker (Sweden) Eva Bjärvall (Sweden) Hanna-Sofia Leijon	150,000	
2004	Swedish International	Upsala	(Sweden) Maria Bodén	211 (−5)	4 strokes	(Sweden) Sara Jelander	150,000	
2003	Swedish International	Upsala	(Sweden) Emelie Svenningsson	215 (−1)	1 stroke	(Sweden) Mikaela Parmlid	150,000	
2002	Gefle Ladies Open	Gävle	(Sweden) Anna Becker	209 (−7)	3 strokes	(Sweden) Marlene Hedblom	200,000	
2001	Gefle Ladies Open	Gävle	(Sweden) Malin Burström	212 (−4)	1 stroke	(Sweden) Maria Bodén (Sweden) Susanna Gustafsson	200,000	
2000	Gefle Ladies Open	Gävle	(Sweden) Lisa Hed	214 (+1)	Playoff	(Finland) Riikka Hakkarainen	200,000	
1999	Timrå Ladies Open	Timrå	(Sweden) Eva-Lotta Strömlid	216 (E)	1 stroke	(Sweden) Karolina Andersson	100,000	
1998	Timrå Ladies Open	Timrå	(Sweden) Sara Jelander	225 (+9)	2 strokes	(Sweden) Maria Bodén (a) (Sweden) Rebecka Heinmert (a) (Sweden) Sofia Johansson (a)	150,000	
1997	Timrå Ladies Open	Timrå	(Sweden) Malin Tveit	227 (+11)	3 strokes	(Sweden) Maria Bodén (a)	150,000	
1996	Körunda Ladies Open	Nynäshamn	(Sweden) Petra Rigby	215 (−1)	Playoff	(Sweden) Marlene Hedblom	85,000	
1995	Aspeboda Ladies Open	Falun-Borlänge	(Sweden) Mia Löjdahl (a)	219 (+3)	Playoff	(Sweden) Pernilla Sterner	85,000	
1994	Höganäs Ladies Open	Mölle	(Sweden) Petra Rigby	219 (+3)	2 strokes	(Sweden) Maria Bertilsköld	100,000	
1993	Rörstrand Ladies Open	Lidköping	(Scotland) Dale Reid	216 (+3)	1 stroke	(Sweden) **Karolina Andersson** (a) (Note: National champions in bold) (Sweden) Carin Hjalmarsson (England) Sarah Nicklin	100,000	
1992	Ängsö Ladies Open	Ängsö	(Sweden) Charlotta Sörenstam (a)	141 (−3)	Playoff	(Sweden) Maria Brink	85,000	
1991	Ansvar Ladies Open	Tobo	(Sweden) Anna Berg (a)	290 (+2)	7 strokes	(Sweden) Marie Wennersten-From	75,000	
1990	Ansvar Ladies Open	Tobo	(Sweden) Margareta Bjurö	297	4 strokes	(Sweden) Marie Wennersten-From	100,000	
1989	Swedish International	Wittsjö	(Sweden) Susann Norberg	291	4 strokes	(Sweden) Marie Wennersten-From	100,000	
1988	Trygg-Hansa Open	Hässleholm	(Sweden) Helen Alfredsson (a)	290	8 strokes	(Sweden) Sofia Grönberg	50,000	
1987	Trygg-Hansa Open	Drottningholm	(Japan) Michiko Hattori	284	5 strokes	(Sweden) **Helene Andersson**	50,000	
1986	Trygg-Hansa Open	Östersund	(Sweden) Pia Nilsson	300	12 strokes	(Sweden) Gisela Cunningham (Sweden) Eva Dahllöf	50,000	
1985	Swedish International	Rya	(France) Karine Espenasse	297	1 stroke	(Sweden) **Liv Wollin**		
1984	Swedish International	Söderåsen	(Sweden) Charlotte Montgomery	301				

=== Amateur tournament ===
Year	Venue	Winner	Score
1983	Hovås	(Sweden) Anna Oxenstierna	303
1982	Örebro	(Sweden) Liselotte Neumann	291
1981	Jönköping	(Sweden) Liselotte Neumann	282
1980	Drottningholm	(Switzerland) Marie Christine de Werra (Sweden) Charlotte Montgomery (Note: National champion)	288
1979	Ljunghusen	(Sweden) Liv Wollin	299
1978	Värnamo	(Sweden) Kärstin Ehrnlund	204
1977	Kristianstad	(Sweden) Liv Wollin	297
1976	Upsala	(Sweden) Hillewi Hagström	294
1975	Åtvidaberg	(Sweden) Marie Wennersten	303
1974	Gullbringa	(Sweden) Monica Andersson	323
1973	Bokskogen	(Sweden) Hillewi Hagström	313
1972	Karlstad	(Sweden) Liv Wollin	301
1971	Wermdö	(Sweden) Liv Wollin	304
1970	Jönköping	(Sweden) Liv Wollin	290
1969	Hovås	(Sweden) Liv Wollin	230
1968	Halmstad	(Sweden) Nina Rehnquist	238
1967	Eskilstuna	(Norway) Vivi Marstrand-Horn	154
1966	Kevinge	(Sweden) Liv Wollin	144
1965	Båstad	(Sweden) Cecilia Perslow	153
1964	Halmstad GC	(Sweden) Liv Wollin	148
1963	Linköping	(Sweden) Nina Rehnquist	167
1962	Mölle	(Sweden) Britt Mattsson	162

== See also ==
- Swedish International – Men's tournament
