= 1991 Swedish Golf Tour (women) =

Sixth season of the Swedish Golf Tour (women)

1991 Swedish Golf Tour (women) season
- Duration: May 1991 – August 1991
- Number of official events: 10
- Order of Merit: (Sweden) Marie Wennersten-From

The 1991 Swedish Golf Tour, known as the Lancôme Tour for sponsorship reasons, was the sixth season of the Swedish Golf Tour, a series of professional golf tournaments for women held in Sweden.

No single player won more than one title this season, while Marie Wennersten-From won her second Order of Merit following one victory and four runner-up finishes.

== Schedule ==
The season consisted of 10 tournaments played between May and August, where one event was included on the 1991 Ladies European Tour.

Date	Tournament	Location	Winner	Score	Margin of victory	Runner(s)-up	Purse (SEK)	Note	Ref
19 May	Höganäs Ladies Open	Mölle Golf Club	(Sweden) Catrin Nilsmark	212 (−4)	5 strokes	(Sweden) Maria Bertilsköld (a)	100,000		
26 May	Rörstrand Ladies Open	Lidköping	(Sweden) Maria Bertilsköld (a)	212 (−1)	5 strokes	(Sweden) Maria Brink (a)	85,000		
8 Jun	Grundig Team Trophy	Drottningholm	(Sweden) Viveca Hoff & (Sweden) Marie Wennersten-From			(Sweden) Maria Bertilsköld (a) & (Sweden) Annika Sörenstam (a)	80,000	Team event	
16 Jun	Ängsö Ladies Open	Ängsö	(Sweden) Annika Sörenstam (a)	219 (+3)	3 strokes	(Sweden) Marie Wennersten-From	75,000		
30 Jun	Stora Lundby Ladies Open	Stora Lundby	(Netherlands) Mette Hageman (a)	219 (+3)	2 strokes	(Sweden) Marie Wennersten-From	75,000		
20 Jul	SM Match	Hook	(Sweden) Linda Ericsson (a)	8&6		(Sweden) Maria Brink (a)	200,000		
28 Jul	Aspeboda Ladies Open	Falun-Borlänge	(Sweden) Maria Hjorth (a)	218 (+2)	7 strokes	(Sweden) Ulrika Johansson	75,000		
3 Aug	SI Ansvar Ladies Open	Tobo	(Sweden) Anna Berg (a)	290 (+2)	7 strokes	(Sweden) Marie Wennersten-From	75,000		
11 Aug	Conor Ladies Open	Sigtuna	(Sweden) Pia Andersson	217 (+1)	1 stroke	(Sweden) Jennifer Allmark (Sweden) Helene Koch	80,000		
18 Aug	IBM Ladies Open	Haninge	(Sweden) Liselotte Neumann	282 (−10)	3 strokes	(France) Marie-Laure de Lorenzi	£80,000	LET event	

National Championship tournaments

== Order of Merit ==
Rank	Player	Score
1	(Sweden) Marie Wennersten-From	127,700
2	(Sweden) Pia Andersson	64,150
3	(Sweden) Margareta Bjurö	51,237

== See also ==
- 1991 Swedish Golf Tour (men's tour)
