= 1993 Swedish Golf Tour (women) =

Eighth season of the Swedish Golf Tour (women)

1993 Swedish Golf Tour (women) season
- Duration: May 1993 – September 1993
- Number of official events: 9
- Most wins: 3: (Sweden) Carin Hjalmarsson
- Order of Merit: (Sweden) Carin Hjalmarsson

The 1993 Swedish Golf Tour, known as the Lancôme Tour for sponsorship reasons, was the eighth season of the Swedish Golf Tour, a series of professional golf tournaments for women held in Sweden.

1993 was the third year with Lancôme as the main sponsor. The tour attracted international players as the LET only featured 12 events this season. The number of events increased by two and the oldest tournament, the Höganäs Ladies Open, celebrated its 10th and penultimate installment, won by Annika Sörenstam.

A teenage Maria Hjorth won two tournaments while Carin Hjalmarsson won three, and captured her second Order of Merit.

== Schedule ==
The season consisted of 9 tournaments played between May and September, where one was a 1993 Ladies European Tour event.

| Date | Tournament | Location | Winner | Score | Margin of victory | Runner(s)-up | Purse (SEK) | Note | Ref |
|---|---|---|---|---|---|---|---|---|---|
| 16 May | Höganäs Ladies Open | Mölle | (Sweden) Annika Sörenstam | 211 (−5) | 5 strokes | (Sweden) Maria Bertilsköld | 150,000 | | |
| 16 Aug | SI · Rörstrand Ladies Open | Lidköping | (Scotland) Dale Reid | 216 (+3) | 1 stroke | (Sweden) Karolina Andersson (a) (Sweden) Carin Hjalmarsson (England) Sarah Nicklin | 100,000 | (Note: Andersson won the playoff against Hjalmarsson for the Swedish International national title with a birdie on the first extra hole.) | |
| 13 Jun | Ängsö Ladies Open | Ängsö | (Sweden) Carin Hjalmarsson | 210 (−6) | 3 strokes | (Sweden) Catrin Nilsmark | 85,000 | | |
| 25 Jul | Ingarö Ladies Open | Gullbringa | (Sweden) Jennifer Allmark | 227 (+14) | Playoff | (Sweden) Åsa Gottmo | 75,000 | | |
| 1 Aug | Aspeboda Ladies Open | Falun-Borlänge | (Sweden) Maria Hjorth (a) | 225 (+9) | 1 stroke | (Sweden) Carin Hjalmarsson | 75,000 | | |
| 7 Aug | Härjedalen Ladies Open | Funäsdalsfjällen | (Sweden) Carin Hjalmarsson | 217 (+1) | 1 stroke | (Sweden) Anna Berg (a) | 100,000 | | |
| 22 Aug | IBM Ladies Open | Haninge | (England) Lora Fairclough | 280 (−12) | 3 strokes | (Australia) Corinne Dibnah | £100,000 | LET event | |
| 29 Aug | Sigtuna Ladies Open | Sigtuna | (Sweden) Carin Hjalmarsson | 209 (−7) | 2 strokes | (Sweden) Anna-Carin Jonasson | 75,000 | | |
| 11 Sep | SM Match | Landeryd | (Sweden) Maria Hjorth (a) | 19th | | (Sweden) Jennifer Allmark | 100,000 | | |

National Championship tournaments

== Order of Merit ==
| Rank | Player | Score |
|---|---|---|
| 1 | (Sweden) Carin Hjalmarsson | 94,750 |
| 2 | (Sweden) Maria Bertilsköld | 57,376 |
| 3 | (Sweden) Jennifer Allmark | 52,400 |

== See also ==
- 1993 Swedish Golf Tour (men's tour)
