= 1994 Swedish Golf Tour (women) =

Ninth season of the Swedish Golf Tour (women)

1994 Swedish Golf Tour (women) season
- Duration: May 1994 – August 1994
- Number of official events: 8
- Most wins: 2: (Sweden) Åsa Gottmo
- Order of Merit: (Sweden) Åsa Gottmo

The 1994 Swedish Golf Tour, known as the Lancôme Tour for sponsorship reasons, was the ninth season of the Swedish Golf Tour, a series of professional golf tournaments for women held in Sweden.

1994 was the fourth year with Lancôme as the main sponsor. Åsa Gottmo won two tournaments and her first Order of Merit.

== Schedule ==
The season consisted of 8 tournaments played between May and August, where one event was included on the 1994 Ladies European Tour.

| Date | Tournament | Location | Winner | Score | Margin of victory | Runner(s)-up | Purse (SEK) | Note | Ref |
|---|---|---|---|---|---|---|---|---|---|
| 13 May | SI Höganäs Ladies Open | Mölle | (Sweden) Petra Rigby | 219 (+3) | 2 strokes | (Sweden) Maria Bertilsköld | 100,000 | | |
| 22 May | Rörstrand Ladies Open | Lidköping | (Sweden) Anna-Carin Jonasson (a) | 217 (+4) | 2 strokes | (Sweden) Helene Koch | 85,000 | | |
| 29 May | Esab Ladies Open | Gullbringa | (Sweden) Helene Koch | 219 (+6) | 6 strokes | (Sweden) Carin Hjalmarsson | 100,000 | | |
| 5 Jun | Ängsö Ladies Open | Ängsö | (Sweden) Mia Löjdahl (a) | 212 (−4) | Playoff | (Sweden) Anna Berg | 85,000 | | |
| 24 Jul | Aspeboda Ladies Open | Falun-Borlänge | (Sweden) Åsa Gottmo | 222 (+6) | 1 stroke | (Sweden) Maria Bertilsköld | 85,000 | | |
| 7 Aug | SM Match | Upsala | (Sweden) Maria Hjorth (a) | 19th | | (Sweden) Charlotta Sörenstam | 100,000 | | |
| 27 Aug | Härjedalen Ladies Open | Funäsdalsfjällen | (Sweden) Åsa Gottmo | 217 (+1) | 1 stroke | (Sweden) Maria Hjorth (a) | 100,000 | | |
| 21 Aug | Trygg-Hansa Ladies Open | Haninge | (Sweden) Liselotte Neumann | 274 (−18) | 4 strokes | (Australia) Corinne Dibnah | £100,000 | LET event | |

National Championship tournaments

== Order of Merit ==
| Rank | Player | Score |
|---|---|---|
| 1 | (Sweden) Åsa Gottmo | 71,900 |
| 2 | (Sweden) Maria Bertilsköld | 57,325 |
| 3 | (Sweden) Helene Koch | 55,250 |

== See also ==
- 1994 Swedish Golf Tour (men's tour)
