= 1988 Swedish Golf Tour (women) =

Third season of the Swedish Golf Tour (women)

1988 Swedish Golf Tour (women) season
- Duration: May 1988 – August 1988
- Number of official events: 8
- Most wins: 2 (tie): (Sweden) Helen Alfredsson (Sweden) Marie Wennersten
- Order of Merit winner: (Sweden) Sofia Grönberg

The 1988 Swedish Golf Tour was the third season of the Swedish Golf Tour, a series of professional golf tournaments for women held in Sweden and Denmark.

The tour shared Tournament Directors with the 1988 Swedish Golf Tour, Hans Ström, Bengt Norström and Claes Grönberg, plus Charlotte Montgomery. The player council consisted of Pia Nilsson, Hillewi Hagström, Viveca Hoff and Liv Wollin.

Tournaments were played over 54 holes with no cut, the SI and LET events over 72 holes with cuts.

== Schedule ==
The season consisted of 8 tournaments played between May and August, where two events were included on the 1988 Ladies European Tour.

Date	Tournament	Location	Winner	Score	Margin of victory	Runner(s)-up	Purse (SEK)	Note	Ref
22 May	Kanthal Höganäs Open	Mölle Golf Club	(Sweden) Marie Wennersten	218	1 stroke	(Sweden) Katrin Möllerstedt	50,000		
18 Jun	Ängsö Ladies Open	Ängsö	(Sweden) Pia Nilsson	220	3 strokes	(Sweden) Helene Andersson (Sweden) Elisabet Johanson	50,000		
2 Jul	SI Trygg-Hansa Open	Hässleholm	(Sweden) Helen Alfredsson (a)	290	8 strokes	(Sweden) Sofia Grönberg	50,000		
24 Jul	SM Match Trygg-Hansa Cup	Jönköping	(Sweden) Helen Alfredsson (a)	3&2		(Sweden) Carin Koch	80,000		
7 Aug	Aspeboda Ladies Open	Falun-Borlänge	(Sweden) Marie Wennersten	216	1 stroke	(Sweden) Viveca Hoff	50,000		
14 Aug	Danish Ladies Open	Rungsted	(Belgium) Florence Descampe	285	4 strokes	(United States) Peggy Conley (England) Laura Davies (Sweden) Liselotte Neumann	650,000	LET event	
21 Aug	Gothenburg Ladies Open	Delsjö Golf Club	(France) Marie-Laure de Lorenzi	275	3 strokes	(United States) Peggy Conley	650,000	LET event	
28 Aug	IBM Ladies Open	Haninge	(Sweden) Sofia Grönberg	224	2 strokes	(Sweden) Pia Nilsson (Sweden) Maria Lindbladh	50,000		

National Championship tournaments

== Order of Merit ==
The sponsored name was the ICA-Kuriren Order of Merit.

Rank	Player	Score
1	(Sweden) Sofia Grönberg	34,000
2	(Sweden) Anna Oxenstierna	32,000
3	(Sweden) Gisela Cunningham	30,500

== See also ==
- 1988 Swedish Golf Tour (men's tour)
