= 1992 Swedish Golf Tour (women) =

Seventh season of the Swedish Golf Tour (women)

1992 Swedish Golf Tour (women) season
- Duration: May 1992 – August 1992
- Number of official events: 7
- Most wins: 3: (Sweden) Carin Hjalmarsson
- Order of Merit: (Sweden) Carin Hjalmarsson

The 1992 Swedish Golf Tour, known as the Lancôme Tour for sponsorship reasons, was the seventh season of the Swedish Golf Tour, a series of professional golf tournaments for women held in Sweden.

1992 was the second year with Lancôme as the main sponsor, and the tour remained the only regional ladies golf tour in Europe operating as a feeder tour for the LET. For the first time no events were scheduled opposite LET events. The number of events were limited and prize money somewhat decreased due to the Early 1990s recession.

Carin Hjalmarsson won three tournaments and her first of two consecutive Order of Merit.

== Schedule ==
The season consisted of 7 tournaments played between May and August, where one event was included on the 1992 Ladies European Tour.

Date	Tournament	Location	Winner	Score	Margin of victory	Runner(s)-up	Purse (SEK)	Note	Ref
17 May	Höganäs Ladies Open	Mölle Golf Club	(Sweden) Åsa Gottmo (a)	219 (+3)	2 strokes	(Sweden) Sofia Grönberg (Sweden) Carin Hjalmarsson	100,000		
24 May	Rörstrand Ladies Open	Lidköping	(Sweden) Linda Ericsson (a)	206 (−7)	5 strokes	(Sweden) Anna-Carin Jonasson	85,000		
14 Jun	SI · Ängsö Ladies Open	Ängsö	(Sweden) Charlotta Sörenstam (a)	141 (−3)	Playoff	(Sweden) Maria Brink	85,000		
9 Aug	SM Match	Karlstad	(Sweden) Carin Hjalmarsson	2&1		(Sweden) Margareta Bjurö	150,000		
16 Aug	Aspeboda Ladies Open	Falun-Borlänge	(Sweden) Carin Hjalmarsson	222 (+6)	3 strokes	(Sweden) Helene Koch	75,000		
23 Aug	Conor Ladies Open	Sigtuna	(Sweden) Carin Hjalmarsson	216 (E)	1 stroke	(Sweden) Helene Koch	80,000		
30 Aug	IBM Ladies Open	Haninge	(Sweden) Helen Alfredsson	278 (−14)	2 strokes	(Sweden) Liselotte Neumann	£90,000	LET event	

National Championship tournaments

== Order of Merit ==
Rank	Player	Score
1	(Sweden) Carin Hjalmarsson	81,825
2	(Sweden) Helene Koch	38,700
3	(Sweden) Margareta Bjurö	36,237

== See also ==
- 1992 Swedish Golf Tour (men's tour)
