= Swedish Junior Strokeplay Championship =

Tournament information
- Location: Sweden
- Established: 1977
- Course: Rotating
- Organized by: Swedish Golf Federation
- Tour: Swedish Teen Tour (2001–)
- Format: 72-hole Stroke play
- Month played: July

The Swedish Junior Strokeplay Championship is a national golf tournament in Sweden for golfers under the age of 22, contested for both men and women.

Known also as the JSM Slag, it has been organized by the Swedish Golf Federation since 1977 when JSM Match, the Swedish Junior Matchplay Championship contested since 1939, switched from match play to stroke play format. Since 2001, both JSM tournaments have been held in parallel.

The number of winners who have gone on to become successful pros is considerable. Anders Forsbrand, Jesper Parnevik and Jonas Blixt have won on the PGA Tour or the World Cup. Liselotte Neumann, Helen Alfredsson and Anna Nordqvist have all won LPGA majors.

== Winners ==
Year	Course	Men	Women
2026	Norrköping	Filiph Dock	Ebba Thalén
2025	Göteborg	Erik Tjärnberg	Blondie Persson Lidgren
2024	Landeryd	William Wistrand	Alice Johansson (2)
2023	Gävle	Didrik Ringvall Bengtsson	Alice Johansson
2022	Landeryd	William Leu	Nora Sundberg
2021	S:t Arild	Alfons Bondesson	Andrea Lignell (2)
2020	Kalmar	Daniel Svärd	Andrea Lignell
2019	Vallda	Viktor Hagberg	Sara Ericsson
2018	Landeryd	David Nyfjäll	Elin Fägersten
2017	Vallda	Christofer Rahm	Frida Kinhult
2016	Sollentuna	Jesper Svensson	Pi-Lillebi Hermansson
2015	GolfUppsala	Felix Pålson	Filippa Möörk
2014	Borås	Marcus Kinhult (2)	Isabelle Johansson
2013	Vasatorp	Marcus Kinhult	Linn Andersson
2012	Ljunghusen	Filip Brattse	Linnea Ström
2011	Frösåker	Oscar Lengdén	Frida Gustafsson Spång
2010	Vasatorp	Victor Flatau	Isabella Deilert
2009	Österåker	Pontus Widegren	Madelene Sagström
2008	Falkenberg	Oscar Lengdén	Emma Nilsson
2007	Vidbynäs	Jens Dantorp	Josephine Janson
2006	Landskrona	Nicklas Glans	Caroline Hedwall
2005	Jönköping	Olle Bengtsson	Caroline Westrup
2004	Stenungsund	Carl von Post	Anna Nordqvist
2003	Finspång	Jonas Blixt	Karin Dedering
2002	Österlen	David Gustafsson	Louise Stahle
2001	Vasatorp	Steven Jeppesen	Emelie Svenningsson
1992–2000: No tournament
1991	Falsterbo	Klas Eriksson	Ulrika Johansson
1990	Lidingö	Fredrik Andersson Hed	Maria Bertilsköld
1989	Gävle	Pehr Magnebrant	Jennifer Allmark
1988	Perstorp	Lars Herne	Charlotte Bengtsson
1987	Varberg	Olle Nordberg (2)	Helene Koch
1986	Falköping	Olle Nordberg	Margareta Bjurö
1985	Sundsvall	Jesper Parnevik	Helen Alfredsson (2)
1984	Ågesta	John Lindberg	Sofia Grönberg
1983	Lysegården	Magnus Hennberg	Helen Alfredsson
1982	Rya	Magnus Persson	Liselotte Neumann
1981	Norrköping	Freddy Carlsson	Helen Alfredsson
1980	Växjö	Anders Forsbrand	Gisela Linnér
1979	Sollentuna	Ove Sellberg	Pia Nilsson
1978	Isaberg	Toni Lindahl	Kärstin Ehrnlund
1977	Lyckorna	Fredrik Stahle	Marie Wennersten
