= 1990 Swedish Golf Tour (women) =

Fifth season of the Swedish Golf Tour (women)

1990 Swedish Golf Tour (women) season
- Duration: May 1990 – September 1990
- Number of official events: 9
- Most wins: 2 (tie): (Sweden) Jennifer Allmark (Sweden) Margareta Bjurö (Sweden) Annika Sörenstam
- Order of Merit winner: (Sweden) Marie Wennersten-From

The 1990 Swedish Golf Tour was the fifth season of the Swedish Golf Tour, a series of professional golf tournaments for women held in Sweden.

The tournament Directors were Rolf Ericsson, Claes Grönberg and Pia Nilsson. The player council consisted of Katrin Möllerstedt, Susann Norberg, Viveca Hoff and Liv Wollin. Tournaments were played over 54 holes with no cut, the SI and LET events over 72 holes with cuts.

Amateur Annika Sörenstam, Margareta Bjurö and Jennifer Allmark captured the most titles with two wins each, while Marie Wennersten-From won her first Order of Merit.

== Schedule ==
The season consisted of 9 tournaments played between May and September, where one event was included on the 1990 Ladies European Tour.

Date	Tournament	Location	Winner	Score	Margin of victory	Runner(s)-up	Purse (SEK)	Note	Ref
13 May	Kanthal Höganäs Open	Mölle	(Sweden) Annika Sörenstam (a)	221	1 stroke	(Sweden) Marie Wennersten-From	75,000		
17 Jun	Ängsö Ladies Open	Ängsö	(United States) Leigh Ann Mills	223	1 stroke	(Sweden) Pia Wiberg	75,000		
1 Jul	Stora Lundby Ladies Open	Stora Lundby	(Sweden) Annika Sörenstam (a)	219	1 stroke	(Sweden) Anna-Carin Jonasson (Sweden) Pia Nilsson	75,000		
21 Jul	SM Match	Bro-Bålsta	(Sweden) Jennifer Allmark	4&3		(Sweden) Jennifer Mankowitz	100,000		
29 Jul	Aspeboda Ladies Open	Falun-Borlänge	(Sweden) Margareta Bjurö	216	5 strokes	(Sweden) Malin Burström	75,000		
12 Aug	Conor Ladies Open	Sigtuna	(Sweden) Jennifer Allmark	220	1 stroke	(Sweden) Margareta Bjurö (a)	75,000		
26 Aug	Haninge Ladies Open	Haninge	(Scotland) Dale Reid	291	1 stroke	(Northern Ireland) Maureen Garner (England) Alison Nicholas (England) Suzanne Strudwick	700,000	LET event	
8 Sep	Grundig Team Trophy	Drottningholm	(Sweden) Pia Nilsson & (Sweden) Hillewi Hagström	138	2 strokes	(Sweden) Susann Norberg & (Sweden) Victoria Norman	80,000	Team event	
16 Sep	SI Ansvar Ladies Open	Tobo	(Sweden) Margareta Bjurö	297	4 strokes	(Sweden) Marie Wennersten-From	100,000		

National Championship tournaments

== Order of Merit ==
The sponsored name was the ICA-förlaget Order of Merit.

Rank	Player	Score
1	(Sweden) Marie Wennersten-From	71,750
2	(Sweden) Katrin Möllerstedt	47,300
3	(Sweden) Pia Nilsson	39,750

== See also ==
- 1990 Swedish Golf Tour (men's tour)
