= 1986 Swedish Golf Tour (women) =

First season of the Swedish Golf Tour (women)

1986 Swedish Golf Tour (women) season
- Duration: May 1986 – October 1986
- Number of official events: 7
- Most wins: 2: (Sweden) Pia Nilsson
- Order of Merit winner: (Sweden) Liselotte Neumann

The 1986 Swedish Golf Tour was the inaugural season of the Swedish Golf Tour, a series of professional golf tournaments for women held in Sweden.

Pia Nilsson won two tournaments and Liselotte Neumann won the Order of Merit

== Schedule ==
The season consisted of 7 tournaments played between May and October, where two events were part of the 1986 Ladies European Tour.

Date	Tournament	Location	Winner	Score	Margin of victory	Runner(s)-up	Purse (SEK)	Note	Ref
25 May	IBM Ladies Open	Hulta	(Sweden) Helene Andersson (a)	231	1 stroke	(Sweden) Sofia Grönberg (a)	50,000		
27 Jul	SM Match Trygg-Hansa Cup	Eksjö	(Sweden) Helen Alfredsson (a)	4&3		(Sweden) Sofia Grönberg (a)	50,000		
3 Aug	SI · Trygg-Hansa Open	Östersund	(Sweden) Pia Nilsson	300	12 strokes	(Sweden) Gisela Cunningham (Sweden) Eva Dahllöf	50,000		
24 Aug	Kristianstad Ladies Open	Kristianstad	(Australia) Corinne Dibnah	288	1 stroke	(Sweden) Liselotte Neumann	400,000	LET event	
30 Aug	Aspeboda Ladies Open	Falun-Borlänge	(Australia) Karen Lunn	212	2 strokes	(United States) Peggy Conley (Sweden) Liselotte Neumann	400,000	LET event	
14 Sep	Höganäs Ladies Open	Mölle	(Sweden) Hillewi Hagström	231	Playoff	(Sweden) Gisela Cunningham	50,000		
4 Oct	Hook Pro-Am	Hook	(Sweden) Pia Nilsson	155	Playoff	(Sweden) Viveca Hoff (Sweden) Malin Landehag	50,000		

National Championship tournaments

== Order of Merit ==
Rank	Player
1	(Sweden) Liselotte Neumann
2	(Sweden) Marie Wennersten
3	(Sweden) Hillewi Hagström
