= 1989 Swedish Golf Tour (women) =

Fourth season of the Swedish Golf Tour (women)

1989 Swedish Golf Tour (women) season
- Duration: May 1989 – September 1989
- Number of official events: 12
- Most wins: 2 (tie): (Sweden) Pia Nilsson (Sweden) Anna Oxenstierna
- Order of Merit winner: (Sweden) Pia Nilsson

The 1989 Swedish Golf Tour was the fourth season of the Swedish Golf Tour, a series of professional golf tournaments for women held in Sweden and Denmark.

The tour shared Tournament Directors with the 1988 Swedish Golf Tour, Arne Andersson, Bengt Norström and Claes Grönberg. The player council consisted of Pia Nilsson, Maria Lindbladh, Viveca Hoff and Liv Wollin.

Tournaments were played over 54 holes with no cut, the SI and LET events over 72 holes with cuts. The Grundig Team Trophy was a limited field best ball event played over 36 holes.

== Schedule ==
The season consisted of 12 tournaments played between May and September, where two events were included on the 1989 Ladies European Tour.

Date	Tournament	Location	Winner	Score	Margin of victory	Runner(s)-up	Purse (SEK)	Note	Ref
21 May	Kanthal Höganäs Open	Mölle Golf Club	(Sweden) Viveca Hoff	220	Playoff	(Sweden) Malin Landehag (a) (Sweden) Margareta Bjurö (a)	75,000		
28 May	SÅPA Ladies Open	Torekov	Tournament cancelled (Note: Tournament cancelled after the Hennessy Ladies Cup was scheduled opposite on the LET)				75,000		
18 Jun	Ängsö Ladies Open	Ängsö	(Sweden) Anna Oxenstierna	221	1 stroke	(Sweden) Helen Alfredsson	75,000		
2 Jul	Stora Lundby Ladies Open	Stora Lundby	(Sweden) Pia Nilsson	226	2 strokes	(Sweden) Annika Sörenstam	75,000		
23 Jul	Aspeboda Ladies Open	Falun-Borlänge	(Sweden) Marie Wennersten-From	220	5 strokes	(Sweden) Katrin Möllerstedt (Sweden) Victoria Norman	75,000		
29 Jul	Conor SM Match	Sigtuna	(Sweden) Pia Nilsson	1 up		(Sweden) Margareta Bjurö (a)	100,000		
13 Aug	IBM Ladies Open	Haninge	(Sweden) Anna Oxenstierna	216	9 strokes	(Sweden) Pia Nilsson	75,000		
21 Aug	Danish Ladies Open	Rungsted	(Spain) Tania Abitbol	285	Playoff	(France) Marie-Laure Taya	650,000	LET event	
28 Aug	Gislaved Ladies Open	Isaberg	(England) Alison Nicholas	288	2 strokes	(Sweden) Liselotte Neumann	650,000	LET event	
20 Aug	Grundig Team Trophy	Drottningholm Golf Club	(Sweden) Pia Nilsson & (Sweden) Hillewi Hagström	138		(Sweden) Liv Wollin & (Sweden) Charlotte Montgomery	80,000	Team event	
17 Sep	Swedish International	Wittsjö	(Sweden) Susann Norberg	291	4 strokes	(Sweden) Marie Wennersten-From	100,000		
24 Sep	Ansvar Ladies Open	Tobo	(Sweden) Jennifer Posener (a)	183	1 stroke	(Sweden) Pia Nilsson	75,000		

National Championship tournaments

== Order of Merit ==
The sponsored name was the ICA-Kuriren Order of Merit.

Rank	Player	Score
1	(Sweden) Pia Nilsson	90,500
2	(Sweden) Susann Norberg	51,750
3	(Sweden) Hillewi Hagström	51,200

== See also ==
- 1989 Swedish Golf Tour (men's tour)
