= Göteborg Ladies Open =

Tournament information
- Location: Gothenburg, Sweden
- Established: 1985
- Course: Hills Golf Club
- Par: 72
- Tours: Ladies European Tour; LET Access Series; Swedish Golf Tour
- Format: 54-hole stroke play
- Prize fund: €300,000

Tournament record score
- Aggregate: 204 Chiara Tamburlini
- To par: −12 as above

Current champion
- (Sweden) Meja Örtengren (a)

The Göteborg Ladies Open is a women's professional golf tournament on the Swedish Golf Tour, the LET Access Series and the Ladies European Tour held near Gothenburg, Sweden.

== History ==
The tournament has been played intermittently since 1985, typically at Delsjö Golf Club or Albatross Golf Club. In 1985, 1988 and 1989 it was included on the Ladies European Tour schedule.

In 2009 and 2010, the even was hosted by Kungsbacka native and PGA Tour winner Fredrik Jacobson.

The 2013 edition was hosted by Karin Sjödin and Linda Wessberg, two former LPGA Tour players that grew up playing at Delsjö Golf Club.

In 2022 the tournament returned, with venue changed to Kungsbacka Golf Club. The club had just hosted the men's Göteborg Open on the 2021 Nordic Golf League.

In 2025, the LET event formerly played as the Helsingborg Open was moved to Gothenburg and hosted at Hills Golf Club.

== Winners ==
Year	Tour(s)	Winner	Score	Margin of victory	Runner(s)-up	Prize fund (SEK)	Venue	Ref
Hills Ladies Open
2025	LET	(Sweden) Meja Örtengren (a)	−6 (68-69-70=207)	2 strokes	(Germany) Leonie Harm (Sweden) Lisa Pettersson	€300,000	Hills	
PGA Championship Gothenburg
2024	SGT · LETAS	(Denmark) Natacha Host Husted	−2 (70-72-69=211)	2 strokes	(Germany) Helen Tamy Kreuzer	€40,000	Albatross	
2023	SGT · LETAS	(Switzerland) Chiara Tamburlini	−12 (70-66-68=204)	5 strokes	(England) Emily Price	€40,000	Kungsbacka	
Göteborg Ladies Open
2022	SGT · LETAS	(France) Nastasia Nadaud (a)	−11 (68-67-70=205)	4 strokes	(Sweden) Emma Thorngren	€40,000	Kungsbacka	
2015–2021: No tournament
Delsjö Ladies Open hosted by Karin Sjödin
2014	SGT	(Sweden) Mikaela Parmlid	E (72-72-69=213)	Playoff	(Sweden) Emma Westin	200,000	Delsjö	
Delsjö Ladies Open hosted by Karin Sjödin & Linda Wessberg
2013	SGT	(Sweden) Mikaela Parmlid	−2 (73-74-67=214)	3 strokes	(Sweden) Lina Boqvist	200,000	Delsjö	
2011–2012: No tournament
Fredrik Jacobson Masters (W) by Telenor
2010	SGT	(Finland) Kaisa Ruuttila	221 (+5)	1 stroke	(Sweden) Marianne Andersson	200,000	Forsgården	
Fredrik Jacobson Masters Powered by Telenor
2009	SGT	(Sweden) Nina Reis	219 (+3)	6 strokes	(Sweden) Madeleine Augustsson	225,000	Kungsbacka	
2002–2008: No tournament
Albatross Ladies Open
2001	SGT	(Sweden) Maria Bodén	227 (+11)	2 strokes	(Sweden) Karin Sjödin	125,000	Albatross	
Mercedes-Benz Ladies Open
2000	SGT	(Sweden) Malin Landehag	151 (+7)	2 strokes	(Sweden) Nina Hansson (a)	100,000	Albatross	
Bridgestone Ladies Open
1999	SGT	(Sweden) Lisa Hed	214 (−2)	4 strokes	(Sweden) Marie Hedberg	100,000	Albatross	
Göteborgs Kex Ladies Open
1998	SGT	(New Zealand) Lynnette Brooky	−6 (66-71-70=207)	Playoff	(Sweden) Malin Burström	150,000	Delsjö	
1997	SGT	(Sweden) Anna-Carin Jonasson	−3 (71-72-70=213)	Playoff	(Sweden) Sara Melin	100,000	Delsjö	
Delsjö Ladies Open
1996	SGT	(Sweden) Maria Hjorth	+5 (77-72-72=221)	2 strokes	(Sweden) Helene Koch	100,000	Delsjö	
1995: No tournament
Esab Ladies Open
1994	SGT	(Sweden) Helene Koch	+6 (219)	6 strokes	(Sweden) Carin Hjalmarsson	100,000	Gullbringa	
1990–1993: No tournament
Gislaved Ladies Open
1989	SGT · LET	(England) Alison Nicholas	E (288)	2 strokes	(Sweden) Liselotte Neumann	650,000	Isaberg	
Gothenburg Ladies Open
1988	SGT · LET	(France) Marie-Laure de Lorenzi-Taya	−9 (275)	3 strokes	(United States) Peggy Conley	650,000	Delsjö	
Delsjö Ladies Open
1987	SGT	(Sweden) Maria Lindbladh	+1 (145)	3 strokes	(Sweden) Anna Oxenstierna	50,000	Delsjö	
1986: No tournament
1985	LET	(Scotland) Cathy Panton	−3 (210)	1 stroke	(United States) Kelly Leadbetter (Sweden) Marie Wennersten	250,000	Delsjö	

== See also ==
- Göteborg Masters
