= Jennifer Allmark =

Swedish professional golfer (born 1969)

Personal information
- Full name: Mia Jennifer Allmark
- Nickname: Penning
- Nationality: Sweden
- Born: 3 February 1969 (age 57)

Career
- Sport: Golf
- College: Oklahoma State University
- Turned professional: 1991
- Former tours: Ladies European Tour (1991–1996); Swedish Golf Tour
- Professional wins: 3

Jennifer Allmark (born 3 February 1969) is a retired Swedish professional golfer. She played on the Ladies European Tour 1991–1996.

== Amateur career ==
Allmark had a successful amateur career and represented Österlen Golf Club. She won the 1985 Colgate Cup, and bronze at the 1988 European Lady Junior's Team Championship with a team that included Carin Koch and Pernilla Sterner. She won the Swedish Junior Strokeplay Championship in 1989, and was runner-up at the 1990 St Rule Trophy at the Old Course at St Andrews after Annika Sörenstam beat her on the first playoff hole.

Allmark enrolled at Oklahoma State University in 1988 and played with the Oklahoma State Cowgirls golf team for the 1988–89 season.

She represented Sweden at the 1990 Espirito Santo Trophy together with Åsa Gottmo and Annika Sörenstam in Christchurch, New Zealand.

Allmark played on the 1990 Swedish Golf Tour as an amateur, and won the Conor Ladies Open and SM Match, after beating Anna Oxenstierna in the quarterfinal and Maria Bertilsköld on the 26th hole in the semifinal.

== Professional career ==
Allmark turned professional in 1991 and joined the Swedish Golf Tour, where she was runner-up at the Conor Ladies Open as a rookie. She lost the final of the 1993 SM Match to Maria Hjorth on the 19th hole, before winning the 1993 Ingarö Ladies Open in a playoff with Åsa Gottmo.

Allmark played on the Ladies European Tour between 1991 and 1996, where her best finish was a tie for 8th at the 1994 Open de France Dames.

== Amateur wins ==
- 1985 Colgate Cup
- 1989 Swedish Junior Strokeplay Championship

== Professional wins (3) ==
=== Swedish Golf Tour wins (3) ===
No.	Date	Tournament	Winning score	To par	Margin of victory	Runner-up	Ref
1	21 Jul 1990	SM Match (as an amateur)	4 & 3			(Sweden) Jennifer Posener	
2	12 Aug 1990	Conor Ladies Open (as an amateur)	220	+4	1 stroke	(Sweden) Margareta Bjurö	
3	25 Jul 1993	Ingarö Ladies Open	227	+14	Playoff	(Sweden) Åsa Gottmo	

== Team appearances ==
Amateur

- European Lady Junior's Team Championship (representing Sweden): 1988
- Espirito Santo Trophy (representing Sweden): 1990
