= Petra Rigby-Jinglöv =

Swedish professional golfer (born 1969)

Personal information
- Nationality: Sweden
- Born: 20 February 1969 (age 57)

Career
- Sport: Golf
- Turned professional: 1994
- Former tours: Ladies European Tour (1994–1999); Ladies Asian Golf Tour; Swedish Golf Tour
- Professional wins: 3

Number of wins by tour
- Asian Tour: 1

Petra Rigby-Jinglöv (born 20 February 1969) is a retired Swedish professional golfer who played on the Ladies European Tour and the Ladies Asian Golf Tour. She won the 1997 Malaysia JAL Ladies Open.

== Amateur career ==
Rigby-Jinglöv was selected for the National Team and won silver at the 1991 European Ladies' Team Championship at Wentworth Golf Club, teamed with Maria Bertilsköld, Charlotte Eliasson, Åsa Gottmo, Carin Koch and Annika Sörenstam, under captain Pia Nilsson.

== Professional career ==
Rigby-Jinglöv turned professional in 1994 and joined the Ladies European Tour. Her best finishes as a rookie was a T13 at the Ladies Austrian Open and a T15 at the La Manga Spanish Open. The next year, she recorded a T10 at the season opener, the Costa Azul Ladies Open, and ended the season a career best of 59th on the LET Order of Merit. In 1996, she made the cut at the Women's British Open.

Making five starts on the 1997 Ladies Asian Golf Tour in Taiwan, the Philippines, Malaysia, Thailand and Indonesia, she won the Malaysia JAL Ladies Open with a score of 211, five under par, at Glenmarie Golf & Country Club in Kuala Lumpur.

Rigby-Jinglöv also played on the Swedish Golf Tour and won the 1994 Höganäs Ladies Open at Mölle Golf Club and the 1996 Körunda Ladies Open at Nynäshamn Golf Club, both the respective year's designated Swedish International Stroke Play Championship. She was also runner-up at the 1996 Rörstrand Ladies Open.

In 1998, she won the Swedish Couples' Championship, held at Mariestad Golf Club, together with her husband Mikael Jinglöv.

== Professional wins (3) ==
=== Ladies Asian Golf Tour wins (1) ===
- 1997 Malaysia JAL Ladies Open

=== Swedish Golf Tour wins (2) ===
No.	Date	Tournament	Winning score	To par	Margin of victory	Runner-up	Ref
1	13 May 1994	SI · Höganäs Ladies Open	219	+3	2 strokes	(Sweden) Maria Bertilsköld	
2	7 Jul 1996	SI · Körunda Ladies Open	215	−1	Playoff	(Sweden) Marlene Hedblom	

== Team appearances ==
Amateur

- European Ladies' Team Championship (representing Sweden): 1991
