= Rörstrand Ladies Open =

Tournament information
- Location: Lidköping, Sweden
- Established: 1991
- Course: Lidköping GK
- Par: 71
- Tour: Swedish Golf Tour
- Format: 54-hole stroke play
- Prize fund: SEK 85–100,000
- Month played: May
- Final year: 1997

Tournament record score
- Aggregate: 206 Linda Ericsson (1992)
- To par: −7 as above

Final champion
- (Sweden) Karolina Andersson

The Rörstrand Ladies Open was a women's professional golf tournament on the Swedish Golf Tour played annually from 1991 until 1997. It was always held at the Lidköping Golf Club in Lidköping, Sweden.

The tournament attracted top female Swedish golfers and in 1991 future Ladies European Tour (LET) player Maria Bertilsköld won, while Marie Wennersten, winner of the 1985 Mitsubishi Colt Cars Jersey Open finished third, and Åsa Gottmo, eventual winner of the Wales Ladies Championship of Europe, finished fifth.

1993 marked the tournament's peak, with many international players from the LET taking part, boasting a field including 13-time LET winner Corinne Dibnah, LET/LPGA winners Mardi Lunn, Debbie Dowling, Carin Koch, Sofia Grönberg-Whitmore and that year's winner Dale Reid, a Scottish golfing legend with 21 European Tour victories. On the cusp of breaking through and become LPGA Rookie of the Year 1994, Annika Sörenstam finished 14th, 8 strokes behind Reid.

In 1996 Sophie Gustafson, who would go on to win 16 times on the Ladies European Tour, secured her first professional win head of her maiden LET victory at the Ladies Swiss Open three weeks later. Runner-up Maria Hjorth, the 1995 European Ladies Amateur Champion, had just turned professional and would soon go on to win five times on the LPGA Tour and play 5 Solheim Cups. Charlotta Sörenstam finished tied for 7th, 7 strokes behind Gustafson.

== Winners ==
Year	Winner	Score	Margin of victory	Runner(s)-up	Prize fund (SEK)	Ref
1997	(Sweden) Karolina Andersson (a)	−5 (67-70-71=208)	2 strokes	(Sweden) Nina Karlsson	85,000	
1996	(Sweden) Sophie Gustafson	+4 (73-72-72=217)	4 strokes	(Sweden) Maria Hjorth (Sweden) Petra Rigby	85,000	
1995	(Sweden) Sara Eklund (a)	+9 (77-78-67=222)	1 stroke	(Sweden) Åsa Gottmo (Finland) Riikka Hakkarainen	85,000	
1994	(Sweden) Anna-Carin Jonasson (a)	+4 (217)	2 strokes	(Sweden) Helene Koch	85,000	
1993	(Scotland) Dale Reid	+3 (216)	1 stroke	(Sweden) Karolina Andersson (Sweden) Carin Koch (England) Sarah Nicklin	100,000	
1992	(Sweden) Linda Ericsson (a)	−7 (206)	5 strokes	(Sweden) Anna-Carin Jonasson	85,000	
1991	(Sweden) Maria Bertilsköld	−1 (212)	5 strokes	(Sweden) Maria Brink	85,000	
