= Sörenstam =

Sörenstam is a Swedish surname. Notable people with the surname include:

- Annika Sörenstam (born 1970), Swedish professional golfer
- Charlotta Sörenstam (born 1973), Swedish professional golfer, sister of Annika
