= Höganäs Ladies Open =

Tournament information
- Location: Höganäs, Sweden
- Established: 1984
- Course: Mölle Golf Club
- Par: 71/72
- Tours: Ladies European Tour; Swedish Golf Tour
- Format: 54-hole stroke play
- Prize fund: SEK 100,000
- Final year: 1994

Tournament record score
- Aggregate: 211 Annika Sörenstam
- To par: −5 as above

Final champion
- (Sweden) Petra Rigby

The Höganäs Ladies Open was a women's professional golf tournament on the Ladies European Tour in 1984 and 1985, and on the Swedish Golf Tour between 1986 and 1994. It was always held at Mölle Golf Club in Höganäs, Sweden.

In 1990 Annika Sörenstam won the tournament while still an amateur, a feat Åsa Gottmo repeated in 1992.

== Winners ==
Year	Tour	Winner	Score	Margin of victory	Runner(s)-up	Prize fund (SEK)	Ref
Höganäs Ladies Open
1994	SGT	(Sweden) Petra Rigby	219 (+3)	2 strokes	(Sweden) Maria Bertilsköld	100,000	
1993	SGT	(Sweden) Annika Sörenstam	211 (−5)	5 strokes	(Sweden) Maria Bertilsköld	150,000	
1992	SGT	(Sweden) Åsa Gottmo (a)	219 (+3)	2 strokes	(Sweden) Sofia Grönberg-Whitmore (Sweden) Carin Koch	100,000	
1991	SGT	(Sweden) Catrin Nilsmark	212 (−4)	5 strokes	(Sweden) Maria Bertilsköld (Sweden) Marie Wennersten	100,000	
Kanthal Höganäs Open
1990	SGT	(Sweden) Annika Sörenstam (a)	221 (+5)	Playoff	(Sweden) Marie Wennersten	100,000	
1989	SGT	(Sweden) Viveca Hoff	220 (+4)	Playoff	(Sweden) Margareta Bjurö (Sweden) Malin Landehag	50,000	
1988	SGT	(Sweden) Marie Wennersten	218 (+2)	1 stroke	(Sweden) Katrin Möllerstedt	50,000	
Höganäs Ladies Open
1987	SGT	(Sweden) Marie Wennersten	217 (+7)	9 strokes	(Sweden) Pia Nilsson	50,000	
1986	SGT	(Sweden) Hillewi Hagström	231 (+21)	Playoff	(Sweden) Gisela Cunningham	50,000	
Höganäs Sweden Open
1985	LET	(Sweden) Liselotte Neumann	283 (−1)	1 stroke	(England) Laura Davies	350,000	
1984	LET	(England) Kitrina Douglas	288 (+4)	3 strokes	(Sweden) Liselotte Neumann (a)	230,000	
