= Swedish International =

Swedish International may refer to:

- Swedish Masters International Badminton Championships, a badminton tournament
- Swedish International (women), a women's golf tournament
