= Mölle Golf Club =

Golf club in Mölle, Sweden

Coordinates: 56.2991°N 12.4686°E

- Location in Sweden

Club information
- Location: Mölle, Höganäs Municipality, Skåne County, Sweden
- Established: 1943 (SGF Member)
- Type: Private
- Total holes: 18
- Tournaments: Höganäs Ladies Open (1984–1994)
- Website: mollegk.se

Course
- Designed by: Thure Bruce
- Par: 70
- Length: 5,292 m
- Course record: 63 – Johny Andersson (1969)

Mölle Golf Club is a golf club located on the Kullen peninsula in Höganäs Municipality, southwestern Sweden. It has hosted the Höganäs Ladies Open on the Ladies European Tour.

== Location ==
The course, partially overlooking the Öresund strait, is situated inside the Kullaberg nature reserve, on a peninsula protruding into the Kattegat near the town of Mölle. The course sits on top of a ridge in terrain dominated by rocky outcrops and steep cliffs rising from the sea, with an elevation of up to 188 meters. Vegetation surrounding the course includes a mixed hardwood broadleaf forest consisting of birch, beech, oak and pine trees with an understory of hawthorn, juniper, wild honeysuckle and blackthorn. The site is an area of considerable biodiversity supporting a number of rare species and has been designated as an Important Bird Area as well as a Special Protection Area.

== History ==
The course was conceived and constructed in the middle of World War II by an enthusiastic group of Swedish industrialists, on a site overlooking Occupied Denmark. The club was admitted to the Swedish Golf Federation in 1943 and the opening shot was made by Gustaf Adolf, Crown Prince of Sweden on July 6, 1945. The full 18 hole course was completed in 1959 under the supervision of Thure Bruce.

Amongst the successful players that have represented the club are Johny Andersson, winner of the 1961 European Amateur Team Championship, and Jan Rube, 1974 Swedish Golfer of the Year.

The club has hosted the Höganäs Ladies Open on the Ladies European Tour twice. In 1984 when Kitrina Douglas won ahead of Liselotte Neumann, and in 1985 when Liselotte Neumann won by one stroke over Laura Davies to secure the first Swedish European Tour victory on home soil. Höganäs Ladies Open continued until 1994 as part of the Swedish Golf Tour, then feeder-tour for the LET, and saw Annika Sörenstam win as an amateur in 1990 and again in 1993.

== Tournaments hosted ==
Year	Tour	Championship	Winner
1984	Ladies European Tour	Höganäs Ladies Open	(England) Kitrina Douglas
1985	Ladies European Tour	Höganäs Ladies Open	(Sweden) Liselotte Neumann
1986	Swedish Golf Tour	Höganäs Ladies Open	(Sweden) Hillewi Hagström
1987	Swedish Golf Tour	Höganäs Ladies Open	(Sweden) Marie Wennersten
1988	Swedish Golf Tour	Höganäs Ladies Open	(Sweden) Marie Wennersten (2)
1989	Swedish Golf Tour	Höganäs Ladies Open	(Sweden) Viveca Hoff
1990	Swedish Golf Tour	Höganäs Ladies Open	(Sweden) Annika Sörenstam (a)
1991	Swedish Golf Tour	Höganäs Ladies Open	(Sweden) Catrin Nilsmark
1992	Swedish Golf Tour	Höganäs Ladies Open	(Sweden) Åsa Gottmo (a)
1993	Swedish Golf Tour	Höganäs Ladies Open	(Sweden) Annika Sörenstam /2)
1994	Swedish Golf Tour	Höganäs Ladies Open	(Sweden) Petra Rigby
2008	Swedish Golf Tour	Mölle Masters	(England) Emma Weeks
2009	Swedish Golf Tour	Mölle Masters	(Italy) Anna Rossi
2010	Swedish Golf Tour	Mölle Masters	(Denmark) Line Vedel Hansen
2011	Swedish Golf Tour	Mölle Masters	(Sweden) Johanna Johansson

== Gallery ==
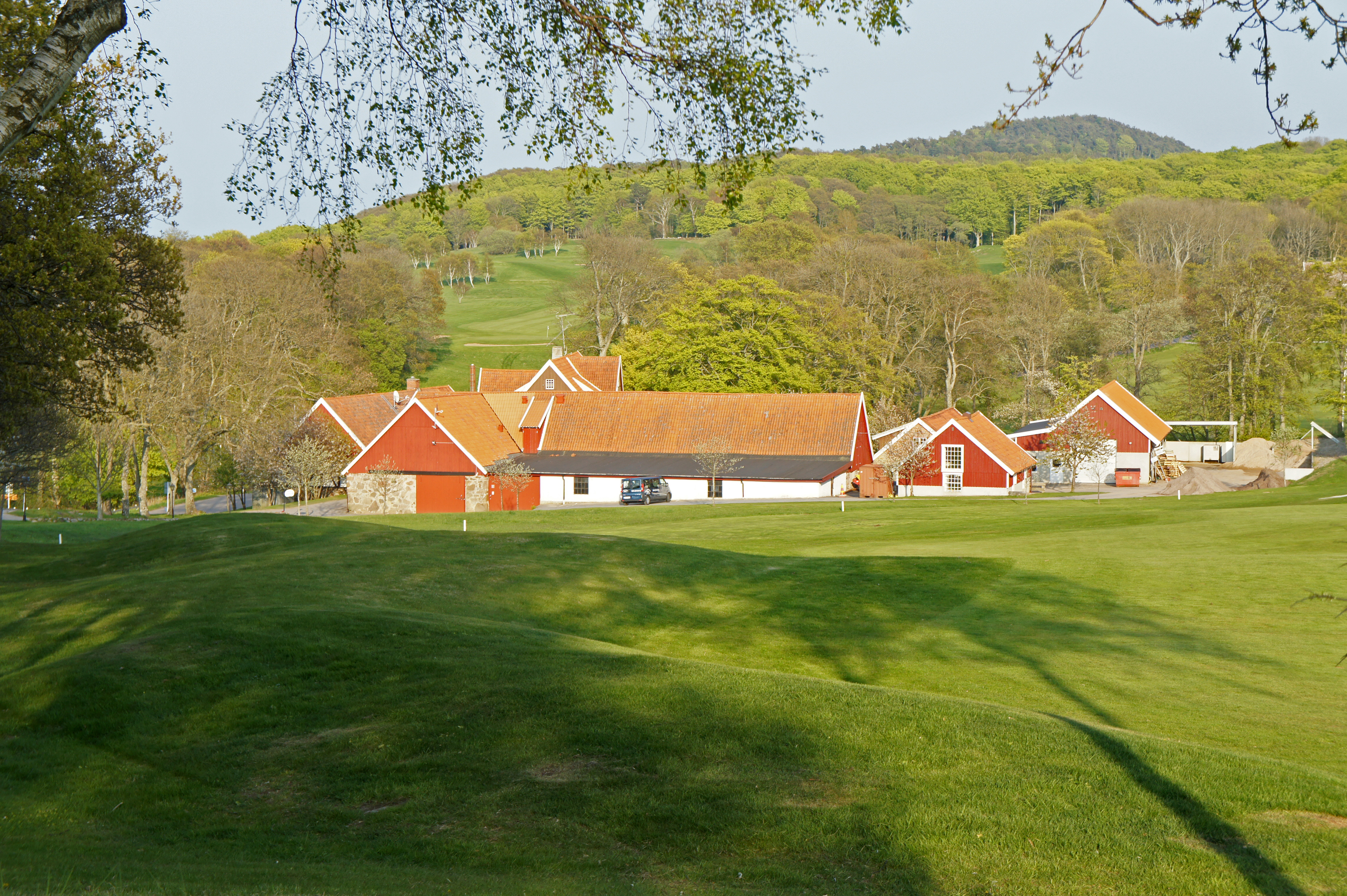
Kullagården Club House

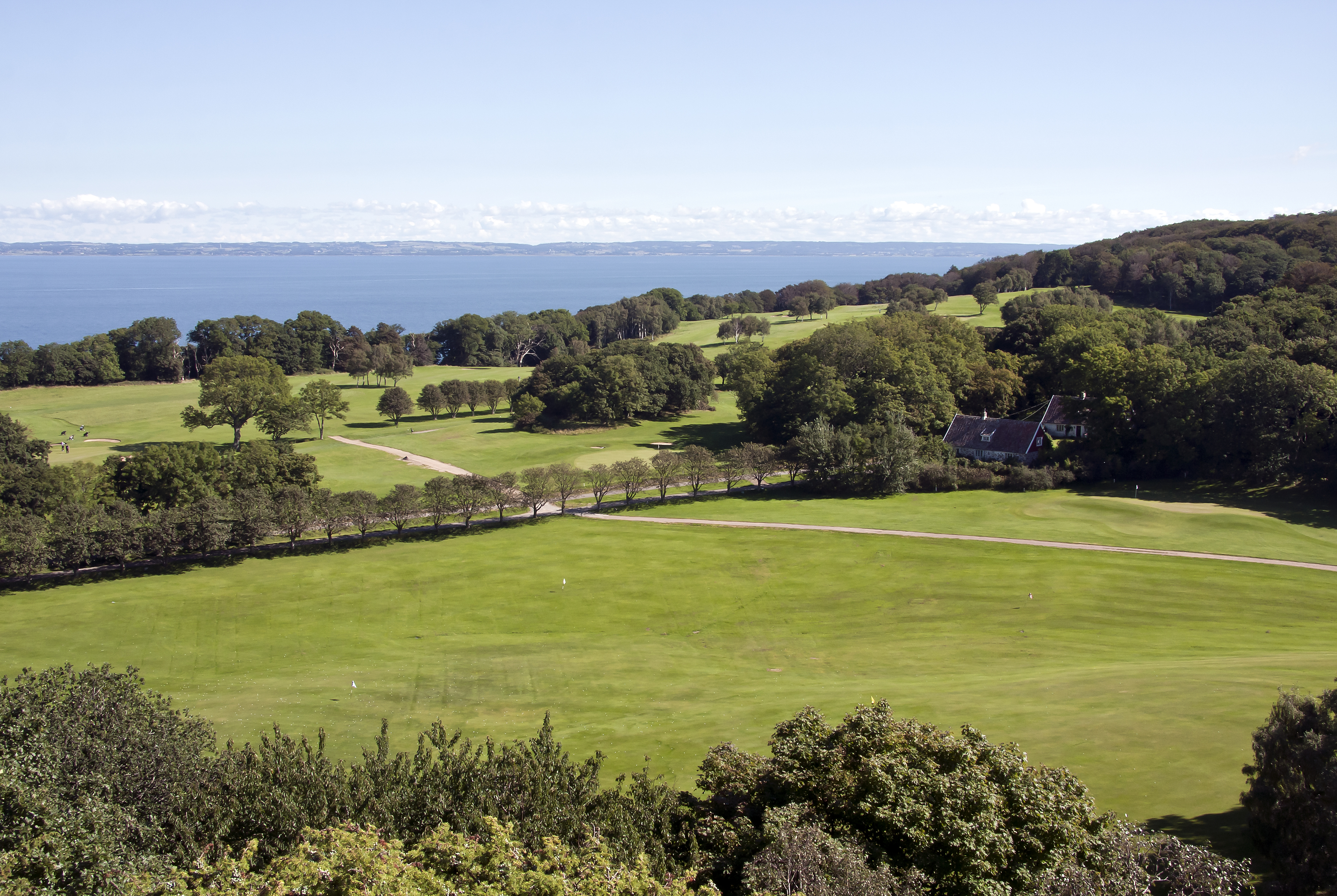
Driving range

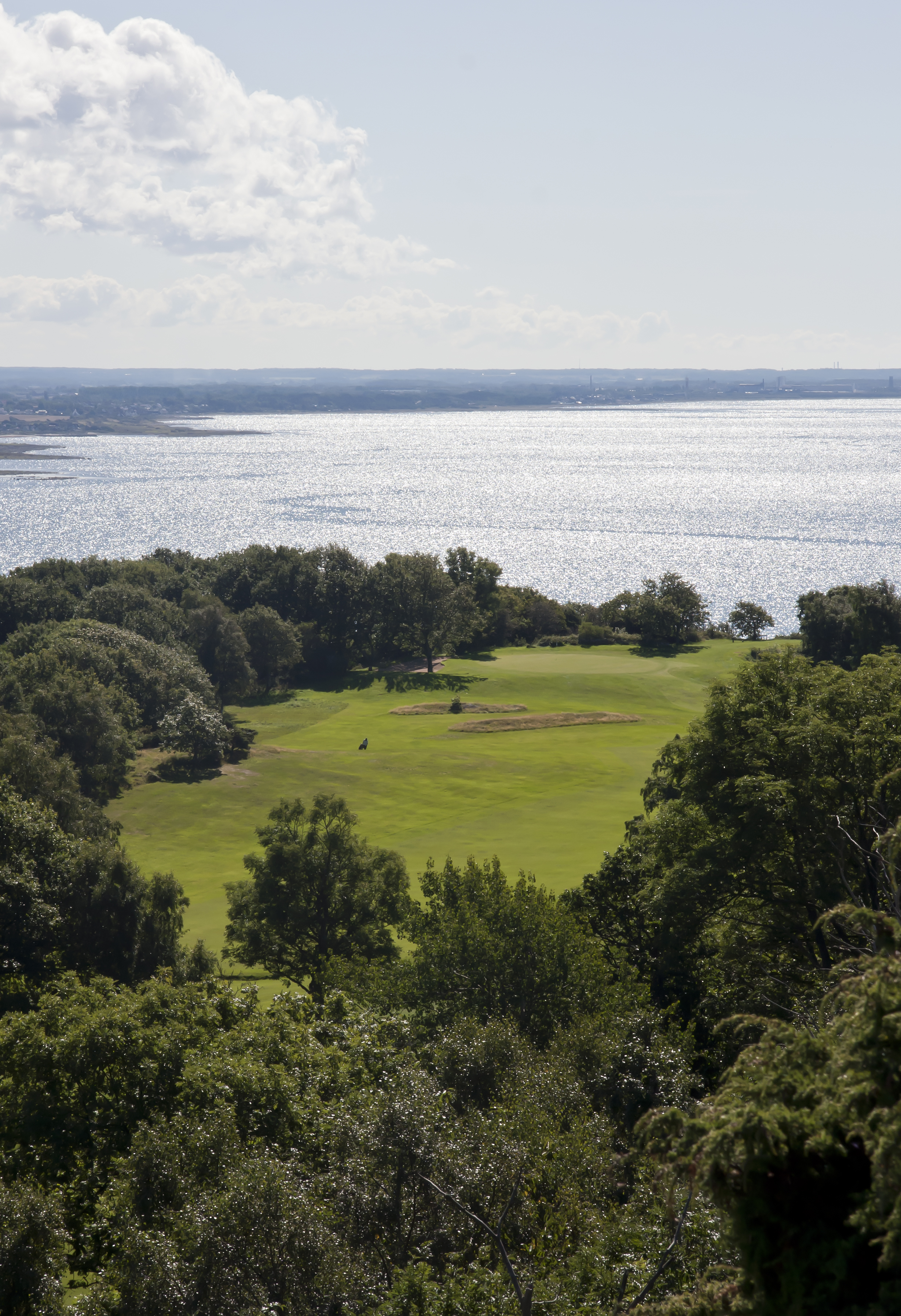
Hole 7 and 8

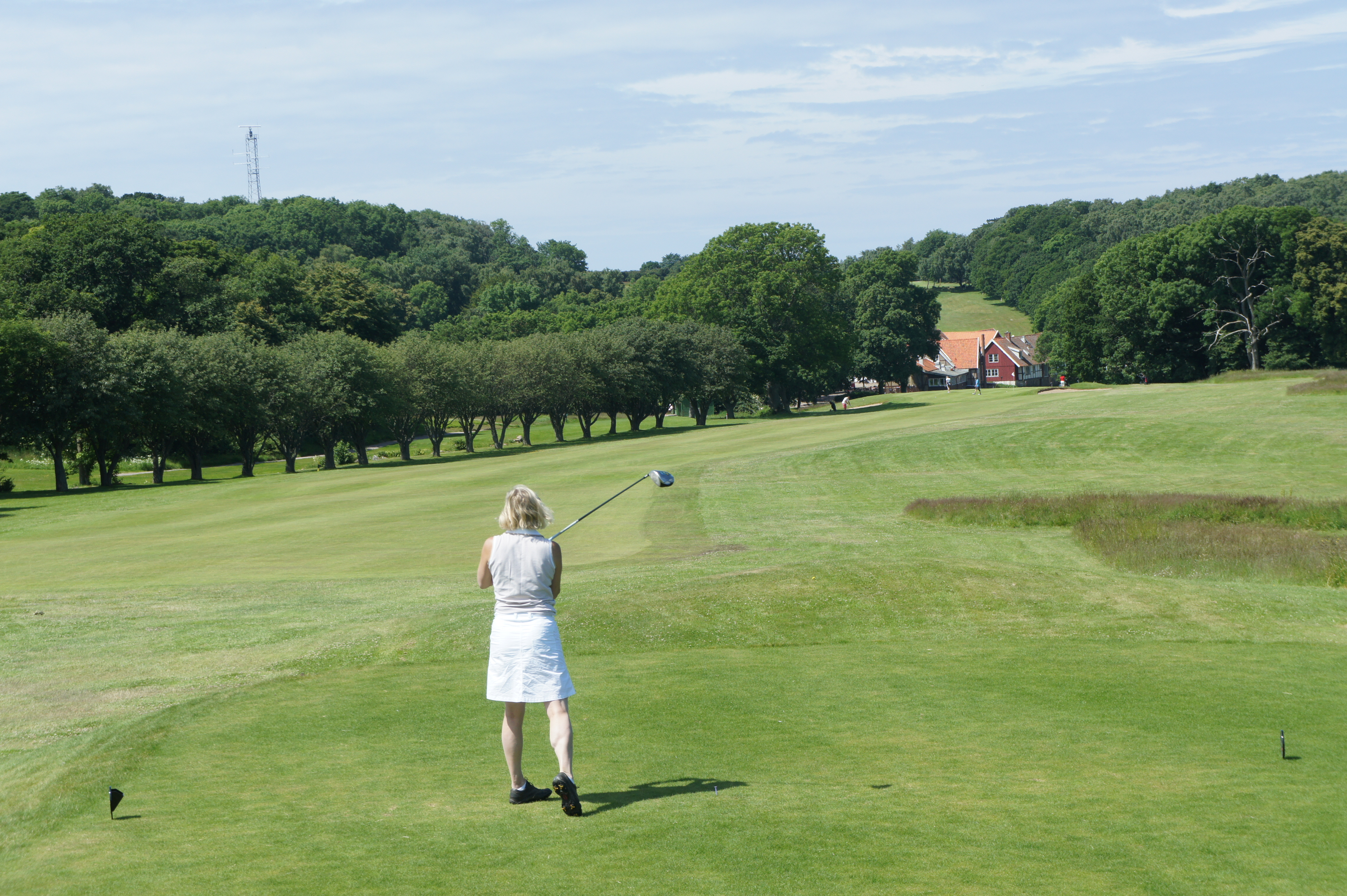
Hole 13

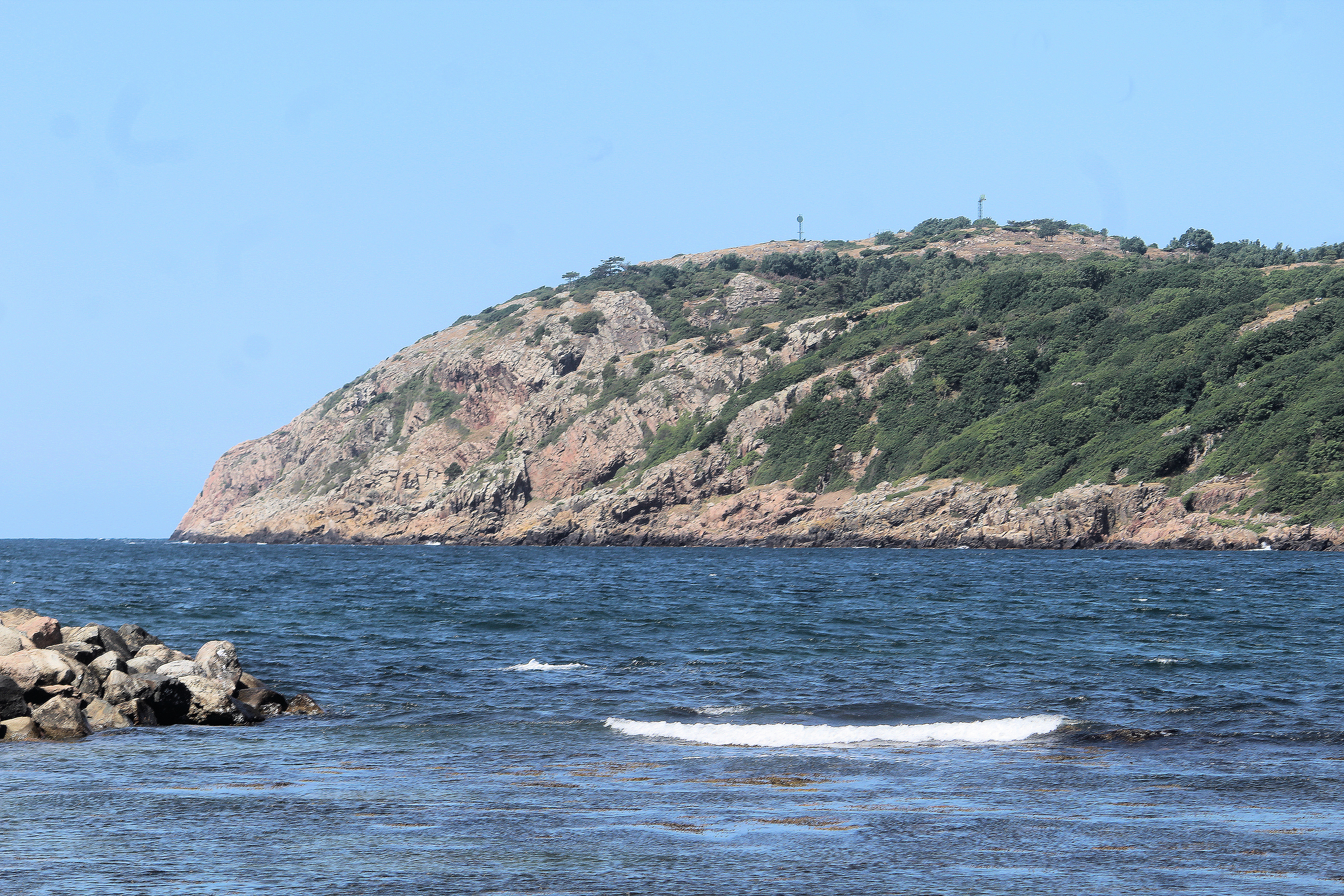
Ridge hosting the course seen from sea level

== See also ==
- List of golf courses in Sweden
