= Sigtuna Ladies Open =

Tournament information
- Location: Sigtuna, Sweden
- Established: 1990
- Course: Sigtuna Golf Club
- Tour: Swedish Golf Tour
- Format: 54-hole stroke play
- Prize fund: SEK 75,000
- Final year: 1993

Tournament record score
- Aggregate: 209 Carin Hjalmarsson (1993)
- To par: −7 as above

Final champion
- (Sweden) Carin Hjalmarsson

The Sigtuna Ladies Open was a women's professional golf tournament on the Swedish Golf Tour played annually from 1990 until 1993. It was always held at the Sigtuna Golf Club in Sigtuna, Sweden.

== Winners ==
Year	Winner	Score	Margin of victory	Runner(s)-up	Prize fund (SEK)	Ref
Sigtuna Ladies Open
1993	(Sweden) Carin Hjalmarsson	209 (–7)	2 strokes	(Sweden) Anna-Carin Jonasson	75,000	
Conor Ladies Open
1992	(Sweden) Carin Hjalmarsson	216 (E)	1 stroke	(Sweden) Helene Koch	80,000	
1991	(Sweden) Pia Andersson	217 (+1)	1 stroke	(Sweden) Jennifer Allmark (Sweden) Helene Koch	80,000	
1990	(Sweden) Jennifer Allmark (a)	220 (+4)	1 stroke	(Sweden) Margareta Bjurö (a)	75,000	
