= 1990 Espirito Santo Trophy =

Tournament information
- Dates: 18–21 October
- Location: Christchurch, New Zealand; 43°31′48″S 172°37′13″E
- Course: Russley Golf Club
- Organized by: World Amateur Golf Council
- Format: 72 holes stroke play

Statistics
- Par: 73
- Length: 6,134 yards (5,609 m)
- Field: 26 teams 78 players

Champion
- United States; Vicki Goetze, Pat Hurst, Karen Noble
- 585 (+1)
- Location in New Zealand

The 1990 Espirito Santo Trophy took place 18–21 October at Russley Golf Club in Christchurch, New Zealand.

It was the 14th women's golf World Amateur Team Championship for the Espirito Santo Trophy. The tournament was a 72-hole stroke play team event with 26 team entries, each with three players. The best two scores for each round counted towards the team total.

The United States team won the Trophy, defending their title from two years ago and earning the title for the 11th time, beating the hosting country team New Zealand by 12 strokes. New Zealand earned the silver medal while the combined team of Great Britain & Ireland took the bronze on third place another eight strokes back.

== Teams ==
26 teams entered the event and completed the competition. Each team had three players.

Country	Players
Argentina	Maria Olivero, Maria Eugenia Noguerol, Maria Lucia White
Australia	Louise Briers, Wendy Doolan, Sarah Gauthrey
Austria	Natascha B. Fink, Katharina Poppmeier, Ike Wieser
Belgium	Sylvie Clausset, Aline Van Der Haegen, Catherine Pons
Bermuda	Madeline Joell, Kim Marshall, Sherley Wildi
Brazil	Elisabeth Nickhorn, Beatriz Santin, Cristina Schmitt
Canada	Eve Lyne Biron, Mary Ann Lapointe, Terill Samuel
Chile	Ana Maria Cambiaso, Isabel Santa Maria, Beatriz Steeger
China	Hu-fan Huang, Yu-chen Huang, Pay-fen Lien
Denmark	Pernille Carlson, Jane Kragh, Anne Larsson
Fiji	Lyndall Fisher, Kijni North, Sal Tuivanuavou
France	Delphine Bourson, Sandrine Mendiburu, Kristel Mourgue d'Algue
Germany	Tina Fischer, Anette Jansen, Marita Koch
Great Britain & Ireland	Julie Hall, Claire Hourihane Dowling, Vicki Thomas
Hong Kong	Joann Hardwick, Victoria Scott, Sue Tonrue
Italy	Silvia Cavalleri, Anna Nistri, Caterina Quintarelli
Japan	Michiko Hattori, Miki Saito, Aki Takamura
Mexico	Erika Diaz, Roxana Lemus, Vinny Rivello
Netherlands	Mette Hageman, Susan Hijgen, Dagmar De Vries
New Zealand	Lisa Aldrige, Jan Cooke Higgins, Anette Scott
Norway	Cathrine Höyer, Anna Skanse Dönnestad, Vibeke Stensrud
Philippines	Mary Grace Estuesta, Jamille Jose, Yvette de Leon
South Korea	Jong Im Lee, Jae Sook Won, Sung Mi Yeom
Spain	Carmen Floran, Estefania Knuth, Esther Valera
Sweden	Jennifer Allmark, Åsa Gottmo, Annika Sörenstam
Switzerland	Sophie Ducrey, Jackie Orley, Priscilla Moore
United States	Vicki Goetze, Pat Hurst, Karen Noble

== Results ==
Place	Country	Score	To par
1	United States	148-143-153-141=585	+1
2	New Zealand	152-149-150-146=597	+13
3	Great Britain & Ireland	153-146-155-151=605	+21
4	Japan	156-156-154-141=607	+23
5	Australia	155-151-150-153=609	+25
T6	France	155-149-156-151=611	+27
T6	Germany	150-151-151-159=611	+27
T6	South Korea	159-154-150-148=611	+27
9	Sweden	160-148-155-151=614	+30
10	Spain	159-149-153-155=616	+32
T11	Argentina	157-155-152-153=617	+33
T11	China	156-151-157-153=617	+33
13	Denmark	150-155-158-156=619	+35
14	Canada	157-155-152-156=620	+36
T15	Italy	153-153-163-153=622	+38
T15	Netherlands	158-155-158-151=622	+38
17	Belgium	160-155-159-149=623	+39
18	Philippines	157-153-163-154=627	+43
19	Brazil	153-163-160-155=631	+47
20	Switzerland	163-157-159-156=635	+51
T21	Austria	161-160-160-160=641	+57
T21	Mexico	166-157-157-161=641	+57
23	Norway	167-160-158-159=644	+60
24	Bermuda	172-157-164-161=654	+70
25	Hong Kong	167-169-167-166=669	+85
26	Fiji	175-180-180-176=711	+127

== Individual leaders ==
There was no official recognition for the lowest individual scores.

Place	Player	Country	Score	To par
1	Vicki Goetze	United States	74-76-74-67=291	−1
T2	Jan Cooke Higgins	New Zealand	74-72-74-75=295	+3
T2	Jae Sook Won	South Korea	77-77-72-69=295	+3
T4	Pat Hurst	United States	74-71-81-74=300	+8
T4	Annika Sörenstam	Sweden	78-71-77-74=300	+8
T6	Mette Hageman	Netherlands	75-76-78-73=302	+10
T6	Caterina Quintarelli	Italy	76-78-82-76=302	+10
8	Esther Valera	Spain	78-74-76-76=303	+11
9	Claire Hourihane Dowling	Great Britain & Ireland	79-72-79-74=304	+12
T10	Delphine Bourson	France	75-78-79-73=305	+13
T10	Louise Briers	Australia	78-76-73-78=305	+13
T10	Karen Noble	United States	77-72-79-77=305	+13
