= Delsjö Golf Club =

Golf club in Gothenburg, Sweden

Coordinates: 57.6818°N 12.0249°E

- Location in Sweden

Club information
- Location: Gothenburg, Västra Götaland County, Sweden
- Established: 1962 (SGF Member)
- Type: Municipal
- Tota holes: 18
- Tournaments: Delsjö Ladies Open; Gothenburg Ladies Open
- Website: degk.se

Delsjö
- Designed by: Douglas Brasier; Frank Pennink; Peter Chamberlain (2004)
- Par: 72

Delsjö Golf Club is a golf club located 3 km south of central Gothenburg, Sweden. It has hosted the Delsjö Ladies Open and Gothenburg Ladies Open on the Ladies European Tour.

== History ==
Located in the Delsjön Nature Reserve in eastern Gothenburg, a reservoir for the city, construction was approved by the Gothenburg Municipality Assembly on 17 September 1959 after much wrangling. The municipal course, rare for Sweden, was built with the help of 13 corporate sponsors. The club was admitted to the Swedish Golf Federation in 1962 and the full 18 hole course was completed in 1965.

Together with Royal Drottningholm Golf Club the club hosted the Volvo Open in 1970, where Frenchman Jean Garaïalde ultimately prevailed over Jack Nicklaus by one shot, while The Open champions Bob Charles, Peter Thomson and Kel Nagle trailed further behind. It also hosted the Delsjö Ladies Open and the Gothenburg Ladies Open on the Ladies European Tour in 1985 and 1988.

Karin Sjödin and Linda Wessberg are two LPGA Tour players that grew up playing at the club, along with European Tour winner Sebastian Söderberg.

== Tournaments hosted ==
Year	Championship	Winner
1970	Volvo Open	(France) Jean Garaïalde
1985	Delsjö Ladies Open	(Scotland) Cathy Panton
1988	Gothenburg Ladies Open	(France) Marie-Laure de Lorenzi-Taya

=== Swedish Golf Tour ===
- Delsjö Ladies Open – 1996 · 2013–2014
- Gothenburg Ladies Open – 1997–1998

=== Amateur tournaments ===
- Swedish International Stroke Play Championship – 1969 · 1974

== See also ==
- List of golf courses in Sweden
