= Swedish Junior Matchplay Championship =

Tournament information
- Location: Sweden
- Established: 1939
- Course: Rotating
- Organized by: Swedish Golf Federation
- Tour: Swedish Teen Tour (2001–)
- Format: Match play
- Month played: June

The Swedish Junior Match-play Championship is a national golf tournament in Sweden for golfers under the age of 22, contested for both men and women. The championship is open to Swedish citizens until the year they turn 21.

In Swedish known as JSM Match, it has been organized by the Swedish Golf Federation since 1939. From 1977 to 1991 the championship was contested in stroke-play, the Swedish Junior Stroke-play Championship. Since 2001, the match-play and stroke-play championships have been held in parallel. Five players, four women and one man, have won both in the same year: Louise Stahle (2002), Caroline Hedwall (2006), Isabella Deilert (2010), Linnea Ström (2012) and David Nyfjäll (2018). Two men, Jonas Blixt and Jesper Svensson, have also won both tournaments, but not in the same season.

== Winners ==
| Year | Course | Men | Women |
|---|---|---|---|
| 2026 | Kalmar | Max Drott | Molly Rålin |
| 2025 | Araslöv | Edwin Sjödin | Ella Forss |
| 2024 | Bro-Bålsta | Enzo Persson | Ebba Liljeberg |
| 2023 | Lidköping | Alexander Lindström | Josefin Widal |
| 2022 | Viksjö | Sebastian Nilsson | Rebecca Gyllner (2) |
| 2021 | Österåker | Nils Svanberg | Rebecca Gyllner |
| 2020 | No tournament | | |
| 2019 | Kårsta | Rasmus Rosin | Mathilda Jonsson |
| 2018 | Landeryd | David Nyfjäll (2) | Elin Kumlin |
| 2017 | Ringenäs | David Nyfjäll | Sara Kjellker |
| 2016 | Kumla | Pontus Nyholm | Matilde Stenqvist |
| 2015 | Salem | Calle Hagström | Christine Danielsson |
| 2014 | Vasatorp | Jesper Svensson | Johanna Björk |
| 2013 | Hills | Gustav Held | Emma Svensson |
| 2012 | Ljunghusen | Tobias Edén | Linnea Ström |
| 2011 | Gränna | Filip Brattse | Sofie Nilsson |
| 2010 | Lidingö | Carl Jismark | Isabella Deilert |
| 2009 | Vasatorp | Anders Larsson | Louise Larsson |
| 2008 | Nyköping | Simon Forslund | Nathalie Månsson (2) |
| 2007 | Möre | Christoffer Arvidsson | Nathalie Månsson |
| 2006 | Burvik | Mikael Johansson | Caroline Hedwall |
| 2005 | Ängsö | Jonas Blixt | Linn Gustafsson |
| 2004 | Åtvidaberg | Gustav Nyblom | Josefin Svenningsson |
| 2003 | Stenungsund | Oskar Herrlin | Linda Svensson |
| 2002 | Hook | Niklas Lemke | Louise Stahle |
| 2001 | Västerås | Erik Johansson | Linda Wessberg |
| 2000 | Alingsås | Henrik Botha | Karin Sjödin |
| 1999 | Landskrona | Johan Lundkvist | Maria Bodén (2) |
| 1998 | Lyckorna | Pontus Ericsson | Maria Bodén |
| 1997 | Gränna | Jonas Torines (2) | Rebecca Heimert |
| 1996 | Sollentuna | Jonas Torines | Anna Lindblom |
| 1995 | Ljunghusen | Viktor Gustavsson | Susanne Gillemo |
| 1994 | Hudiksvall | Jimmy Kawalec | Maria Hjort |
| 1993 | Lysegården | Magnus Westerberg | Sophie Gustafson |
| 1992 | Kalmar | Niclas Fasth | Åsa Gottmo |
1977–1991 contested as the Swedish Junior Strokeplay Championship
| 1976 | Falsterbo | Anders Johnsson | Cecilia Tillström |
| 1975 | Upsala | Peter Lindwall | Mia Brantberg |
| 1974 | Viksjö | Thomas Bergström | Anna Dönnerstad |
| 1973 | Linköping | Bob Bäckstedt | Hillevi Hagström (2) |
| 1972 | Borås | Oddbjörn Hagström | Hillevi Hagström |
| 1971 | Lund | Torbjörn Arvidsson | Christina Westerberg |
| 1970 | Södertälje | Olle Dahlgren (2) | Anna Skanse Dönnestad |
| 1969 | Djursholm | Olle Dahlgren | Nailil Skog |
| 1968 | Kalmar | Gunnar Mueller | Monica Andersson |
| 1967 | Hovås | Jan Rosell (2) | Christina Westerberg |
| 1966 | Ljunghusen | Jan Rosell | Liv Wollin |
| 1965 | Tylösand | Johan Lindeberg | Nina Rehnquist (2) |
| 1964 | Örebro | Jonas Peil | Nina Rehnquist |
| 1963 | Lund | Tony Lidholm (2) | Karin Stenport |
| 1962 | Jönköping | Tony Lidholm | Liv Wollin |
| 1961 | Djursholm | Claes Jöhncke | Louise Wingård |
| 1960 | Falsterbo | Peter Nordwall | Christina Nordström |
| 1959 | Hovås | Håkan Dahl | Lolo Brasier |
| 1958 | Rya | Gunnar Carlander (6) | Birgit Forssman (2) |
| 1957 | Båstad | Gunnar Carlander (5) | Birgit Forssman |
| 1956 | Båstad | Sven-Erik Uhlin | — |
| 1955 | Tylösand | Gunnar Carlander (4) | — |
| 1954 | Tylösand | Gunnar Carlander (3) | — |
| 1953 | Kevinge | Gunnar Carlander (2) | — |
| 1952 | Båstad | Gunnar Carlander | — |
| 1951 | Tylösand | Göran Lindeblad | — |
| 1950 | Tylösand | Håkan Järbur | — |
| 1949 | Tylösand | Fredrik Carlsson (2) | — |
| 1948 | Tylösand | Gustaf Adolf Bielke | — |
| 1947 | Hovås | Fredrik Carlsson | — |
| 1946 | Hovås | Gunnar Holmqvist | Lillott Mörner (2) |
| 1945 | Tylösand | Bengt Carlsson | — |
| 1944 | Hovås | Hans Stenberg | Lillott Mörner |
| 1943 | No tournament | | |
| 1942 | Hovås | Jan Nathorst-Westfelt | Ann-Marie Brynolf |
| 1941 | Kevinge | Bengt Einar | Maud Röhss |
| 1940 | No tournament | | |
| 1939 | Båstad | Jan Gumpert | Maud Röhss |

== See also ==
- Swedish Matchplay Championship
