= Aspeboda Ladies Open =

Tournament information
- Location: Falun-Borlänge, Sweden
- Established: 1986
- Course: Falun-Borlänge GK Aspeboda
- Tours: Ladies European Tour (1986); Swedish Golf Tour
- Format: 54-hole stroke play
- Prize fund: SEK 85,000
- Final year: 1997

Tournament record score
- Aggregate: 212 Karen Lunn
- To par: −5 Maria Hjorth

Final champion
- (Sweden) Katharina Larsson

The Aspeboda Ladies Open was a women's professional golf tournament on the Swedish Golf Tour. It was played annually from the inception of the tour in 1986 until 1997. It was always held at the Falun-Borlänge Golf Club in Aspeboda, Sweden.

In 1986 the tournament was included on the Ladies European Tour and sometimes referred to as the Borlänge Ladies Open. Originally scheduled to return in 1987, the tournament was withdrawn from the 1987 Ladies European Tour schedule and the prize fund dropped from SEK 500,000 to 50,000.

Marie Wennersten, who finished fourth in 1986, won the tournament three consecutive years 1987–1989. Maria Hjorth won the tournament three times in six years 1991–1996.

== Winners ==
Year	Tour(s)	Winner	Score	Margin of victory	Runner(s)-up	Prize fund (SEK)	Ref
1997	SGT	(Sweden) Katharina Larsson	217 (+1)	5 strokes	(Finland) Riikka Hakkarainen	85,000	
1996	SGT	(Sweden) Maria Hjorth	214 (−5)	5 strokes	(Sweden) Linda Ericsson	85,000	
1995	SGT	(Sweden) Mia Löjdahl (a)	219 (+3)	Playoff	(Sweden) Pernilla Sterner	85,000	
1994	SGT	(Sweden) Åsa Gottmo	222 (+6)	1 stroke	(Sweden) Maria Bertilsköld	85,000	
1993	SGT	(Sweden) Maria Hjorth (a)	225 (+9)	1 stroke	(Sweden) Carin Koch	75,000	
1992	SGT	(Sweden) Carin Koch	222 (+6)	3 strokes	(Sweden) Helene Koch	75,000	
1991	SGT	(Sweden) Maria Hjorth (a)	218 (+2)	7 strokes	(Sweden) Ulrika Johansson	75,000	
1990	SGT	(Sweden) Margareta Burö (a)	216 (E)	5 strokes	(Sweden) Malin Burström	75,000	
1989	SGT	(Sweden) Marie Wennersten	220 (+4)	5 strokes	(Sweden) Katrin Möllerstedt (Sweden) Victoria Norman	75,000	
1988	SGT	(Sweden) Marie Wennersten	216 (+2)	1 stroke	(Sweden) Viveca Hoff	50,000	
1987	SGT · ~~LET~~	(Sweden) Marie Wennersten	221 (+5)	3 strokes	(Sweden) Helena Brobeck	50,000	
1986	SGT · LET	(Australia) Karen Lunn	212 (−4)	2 strokes	(United States) Peggy Conley (Sweden) Liselotte Neumann	400,000	
