= Åsa Gottmo =

Swedish golfer (born 1971)

Personal information
- Full name: Åsa Margaretha Gottmo
- Nationality: Sweden
- Born: 22 June 1971 (age 55) Kalmar, Sweden
- Height: 168 cm (5 ft 6 in)

Career
- Sport: Golf
- Turned professional: 1993
- Former tours: Ladies European Tour (joined 1993); Swedish Golf Tour
- Professional wins: 6

Number of wins by tour
- Ladies European Tour: 1
- Other: 5

Best results in LPGA major championships
- Chevron Championship: DNP
- Women's PGA C'ship: DNP
- U.S. Women's Open: DNP
- Women's British Open: T45: 2002

Åsa Gottmo (born 22 June 1971 in Kalmar) is a retired Swedish professional golfer who played on the Ladies European Tour 1993–2008. She won the 2002 Wales WPGA Championship of Europe and finished 5th in the Order of Merit twice.

== Amateur career ==
Gottmo played for the National Team and represented Sweden at the 1990 Espirito Santo Trophy in New Zealand together with Jennifer Allmark and Annika Sörenstam.

She won silver at the 1991 European Ladies' Team Championship at Wentworth Club together with Maria Bertilsköld, Charlotta Eliasson, Carin Hjalmarsson, Petra Rigby and Annika Sörenstam.

In 1992, Gottmo won the Swedish Junior Matchplay Championship held at Kalmar Golf Club, her home course.

== Professional career ==
Gottmo started playing on the Swedish Golf Tour in 1990, and recorded one victory before turning professional in late 1992. She collected five Swedish Golf Tour victories over the course of her career, and won the Order of Merit back to back in 1994 and 1995.

In 1993 Gottmo joined the Ladies European Tour. Her breakthrough came at the 1995 Ladies Irish Open, where she was runner-up as Laura Davies recorded a 72-hole total of 267 (−25), 16 strokes clear of Gottmo, setting world records for the lowest aggregate score and the biggest margin of victory in women's professional golf.

Gottmo finished fifth on the LET Order of Merit twice, in 2002 and 2004. In 2002, she had one victory, the Wales Ladies Championship of Europe two strokes ahead of Maria Hjorth, and in 2004 she finished top-5 four times, including a tie for 3rd at the Ladies English Open, seven strokes behind winner Maria Hjorth.

Gottmo scored an albatross at the 2002 Women's British Open at Turnberry, one of only four in the history of women's major golf championships.

In 2004, she was runner-up at the South African Women's Masters, two strokes behind Helena Alterby.

== Amateur wins ==
- 1992 Swedish Junior Matchplay Championship

== Professional wins (6) ==
=== Ladies European Tour (1) ===
No.	Date	Tournament	Winning score	To par	Margin of victory	Runner-up
1	25 Aug 2002	Wales WPGA Championship of Europe	76-69-69-71=285	−3	2 strokes	(Sweden) Maria Hjorth

=== Swedish Golf Tour (5) ===
No.	Date	Tournament	Winning score	To par	Margin of victory	Runner(s)-up
1	17 May 1992	Höganäs Ladies Open (as an amateur)	213	+3	2 strokes	(Sweden) Carin Hjalmarsson (Sweden) Sofia Grönberg
2	27 Aug 1994	Härjedalen Ladies Open	217	+1	1 stroke	(Sweden) Maria Hjorth (a)
3	24 Jul 1994	Aspeboda Ladies Open	222	+5	1 stroke	(Sweden) Maria Bertilsköld
4	25 Jul 1997	Hook Ladies Open	208	–8	6 strokes	(Sweden) Mia Löjdahl
5	6 Jun 2003	FöreningsSparbanken Kalmar Ladies Open	209	–7	9 strokes	(Sweden) Eva Bjärvall (Finland) Pia Koivuranta (Finland) Jenni Kuosa

== Results in LPGA majors ==
Tournament	2001	2002	2003	2004	2005	2006
Women's British Open	CUT	T45	CUT	CUT	CUT	CUT

CUT = missed the half-way cut
"T" = tied

== Team appearances ==
Amateur

- Espirito Santo Trophy (representing Sweden): 1990
- European Ladies' Team Championship (representing Sweden): 1991
