= Maria Bertilsköld =

Swedish professional golfer (born 1970)

Personal information
- Nationality: Sweden
- Born: 13 June 1970 (age 56)

Career
- Sport: Golf
- Turned professional: 1992
- Former tours: Ladies European Tour; Swedish Golf Tour
- Professional wins: 3

Maria Bertilsköld (born 13 June 1970) is a Swedish professional golfer and National Team coach. She won the 1990 European Lady Junior's Team Championship and played on the Ladies European Tour for five years between 1992 and 1996.

== Amateur career ==
Bertilsköld won Swedish Junior Strokeplay Championship in 1990. The same year, she won the European Lady Junior's Team Championship with a team that included Annika Sörenstam, Charlotte Eliasson, Åsa Gottmo, Mia Bergman and Carin Koch. Under captain Pia Nilsson, she was a member of the Swedish team that won the silver behind England in the 1991 European Ladies' Team Championship at Wentworth Golf Club.

In 1991, she represented the Continent of Europe in the Vagliano Trophy.

Playing on the 1991 Swedish Golf Tour while still an amateur, Bertilsköld won the Rörstrand Ladies Open. She was also runner-up at the 1991 Höganäs Ladies Open behind Catrin Nilsmark, and runner-up at the Grundig Team Trophy together with Annika Sörenstam.

== Professional career ==
Bertilsköld turned professional in 1992 and joined the Ladies European Tour, where she had her best career finish in her first start, a T10 at the Ford Ladies Classic at Woburn Golf and Country Club. In 1993, she finished a career high 60th on the Order of Merit.

On the Swedish Golf Tour, Bertilsköld was runner-up at the 1993 Höganäs Ladies Open behind Annika Sörenstam. In 1994, she was second in the Order of Merit behind Åsa Gottmo after recording runner-up finishes at the Aspeboda Ladies Open and the Höganäs Ladies Open at Mölle Golf Club. In 1996, she won the Lerum Ladies Open and Adapt Ladies Open, to again finish second in the Swedish Golf Tour Order of Merit, this time behind Maria Hjorth.

Bertilsköld retired from tour after the 1996 season and became a coach for the national team. She coached the Swedish ladies team to gold in EGA Championships in 1997, 2000 and 2004, and to silver in 2001, 2002, 2003 and 2005. Since 2007, she has worked for Team Annika in Europe and the U.S., and in 2013 she joined Österåker Golf Club as a golf instructor.

== Amateur wins ==
- 1990 Swedish Junior Strokeplay Championship

== Professional wins (3) ==
=== Swedish Golf Tour (3) ===
No.	Date	Tournament	Winning score	To par	Margin of victory	Runner-up	Ref
1	26 May 1991	Rörstrand Ladies Open (as an amateur)	212	–1	5 strokes	(Sweden) Maria Brink (a)	
2	10 Aug 1996	Lerum Ladies Open	217	+1	Playoff	(Sweden) Sara Eklund (a)	
3	14 Sep 1996	Adapt Ladies Open	219	+3	Playoff	(Sweden) Nina Karlsson	

== Team appearances ==
Amateur

- European Lady Junior's Team Championship (representing Sweden): 1990 (winners)
- European Ladies' Team Championship (representing Sweden): 1991
- Vagliano Trophy (representing Continent of Europe): 1991
