= Maria Hjorth =

Swedish professional golfer (born 1973)

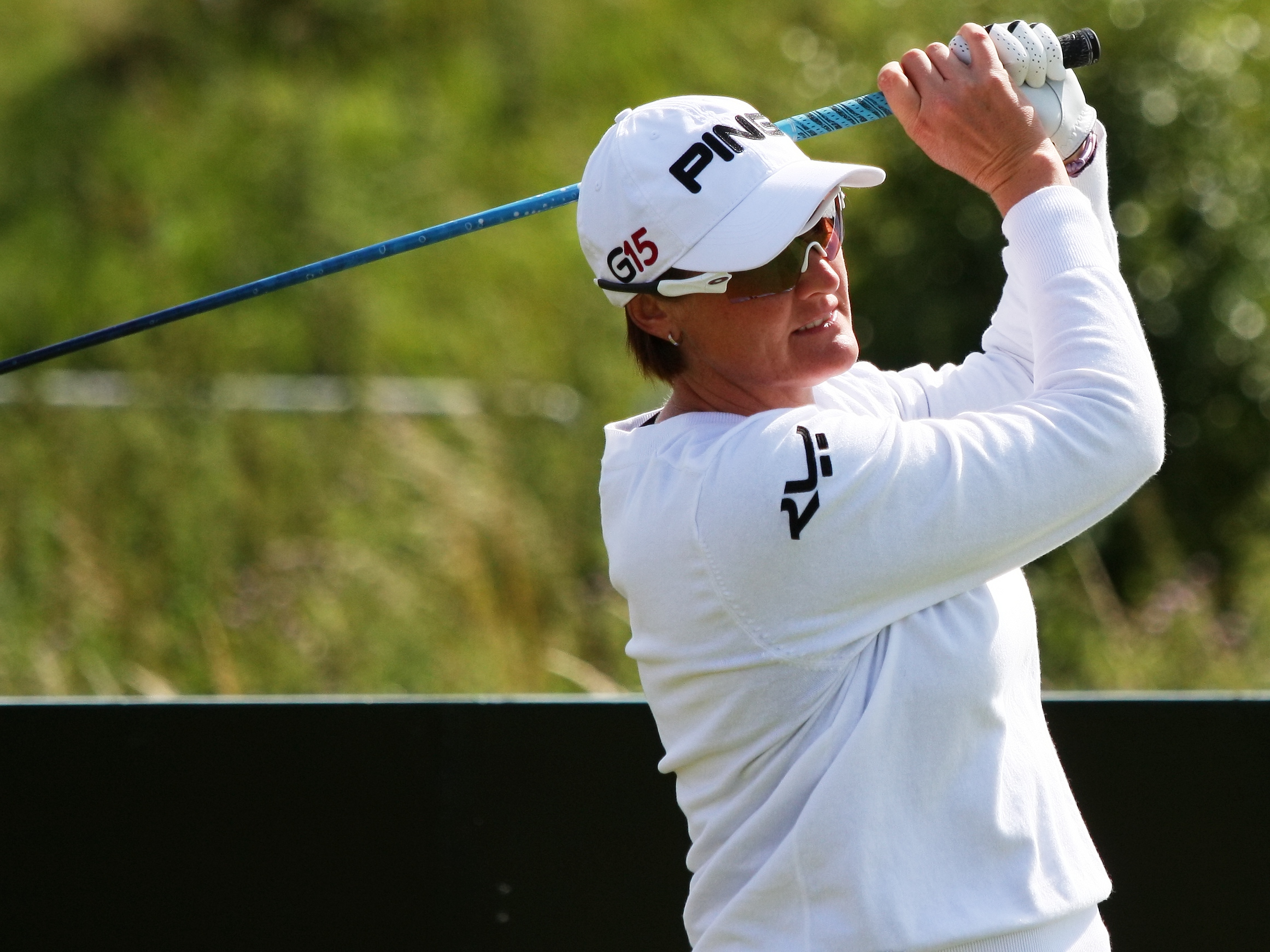
- Hjorth at the 2010 Women's British Open

Personal information
- Full name: Maria Anna McBride
- Nickname: Mimmi
- Nationality: Sweden
- Born: 15 October 1973 (age 53) Falun, Sweden
- Height: 5 ft 9 in (1.75 m)
- Spouse: Shaun McBride
- Children: 1

Career
- Sport: Golf
- College: University of Stirling
- Turned professional: 1996
- Current tour: Legends Tour
- Former tours: LPGA Tour (1998–2016); Ladies European Tour (1996–2016)
- Professional wins: 17

Number of wins by tour
- LPGA Tour: 5
- Ladies European Tour: 2
- Other: 8 (regular); 2 (senior)

Best results in LPGA major championships
- Chevron Championship: 4th: 2008
- Women's PGA C'ship: 2nd: 2008
- U.S. Women's Open: T8: 1999
- du Maurier Classic: T17: 1999
- Women's British Open: T2: 2007
- Evian Championship: DNP

Maria Anna McBride (née Hjorth born 15 October 1973) is a Swedish professional golfer. She has won five times on the LPGA Tour and twice finished second in major championships. As a senior, after turning 50, she completed the "senior slam" winning both of the two senior women's major championships in the same year, the 2026 U.S. Senior Women's Open and the 2026 LPGA Legends Championship.

== Early years ==
Hjorth was born in Falun. As the youngest of three daughters to Kjell and Monica Hjorth, she first gripped a golf club at three years of age. Six years old, she traveled with her family, to compete in the unofficial Swedish Championship for children, the Colgate Cup, for girls up to 10 years of age. After the round, her elder sister helped her to count the score.

Nordic skiing was a main interest during winter time. At ten years of age, Hjorth also began playing curling and later became the youngest ever individual winner of the Swedish Championship in curling.

On the golf course, she usually practiced with boys older than her, why she soon find it natural to play from the same tee as the men. During her amateur career she always represented Falun-Borlänge Golf Club.

== Amateur career ==
Hjorth won many individual amateur titles including the 1995 European Ladies Amateur Championship at Wannsee, Berlin, Germany.

She represented Sweden twice at the Espirito Santo Trophy. In 1992 in Vancouver, Canada, with Annika Sörenstam on the team, Sweden finished fourth. In 1994 at Golf National in Paris, France, the Swedish team finished as bronze medalists. Hjorth was also part of the winning Swedish team at the 1994 European Lady Junior's Team Championship at Gutenhof Golf Club, Austria.

Hjorth attended the University of Stirling in Scotland.

== Professional career ==
Hjorth turned professional in 1996 and won the Swedish Golf Tour Order of Merit that year. She played mainly on the Ladies European Tour (LET) in 1996 and 1997. In late 1997, she finished fourth at the LPGA Final Qualifying Tournament to gain exempt status on the U.S.-based LPGA Tour for the 1998 season. Since 1998 she played mainly on the LPGA Tour, while continuing to play in Europe several times each year.

She has won two individual titles on the LET and five on the LPGA. Winning her second LPGA title in 1999, the Mizuno Classic in Japan, she played with a mix-matched set of clubs because her clubs were lost by an airline.

=== Major championships ===
She once finished second in the Women's PGA Championship, losing in a playoff, and once tied second in the Women's British Open. She was also sole or tied second in the Evian Masters in France three times before it was recognized as a major championship.

=== Professional team appearaces ===
She was a member of five European Solheim Cup teams in 2002, 2005, 2007, 2009, and 2011 and played three times in the Praia d'El Rey European Cup, a team competition sanctioned by the LET.

=== Senior career ===
As a senior, after turning 50, Hjorth, now playing under her last name McBride, won both of the two senior women's major championships in the same year, the 2026 U.S. Senior Women's Open and the 2026 Senior LPGA Championship, completing the same "senior slam" as Laura Davies achieved in 2018 and Hjorth's fellow country women Helen Alfredsson in 2019.

== Private life, awards, honors ==
In 1996, she earned Elite Sign No. 107 by the Swedish Golf Federation, on the basis of national team appearances and national championship performances.

In 2001, she was awarded honorary member of the PGA of Sweden.

In 1995, three weeks before winning the European Ladies Amateur Championship, she was diagnosed with diabetes.

She married Shaun McBride on New Years eve 2007 and since then played under her married name, Maria McBride. Their daughter Emily was born in 2009 and the family resides in Orlando, Florida.

Her husband has caddied for her, as well as for Bryce Molder on the PGA Tour.

== Amateur wins ==
- 1990 Norwegian Open Amateur Championship
- 1991 Girls Amateur Championship, Swedish Youth under 19 Championship
- 1993 French International Lady Juniors Amateur Championship
- 1994 Swedish Junior Match-play Championship
- 1995 European Ladies Amateur Championship, Spanish International Ladies Amateur Championship, Helen Holm Scottish Women's Open Championship

== Professional wins (17) ==
=== LPGA Tour (5) ===
No.	Date	Tournament	Winning score	To par	Margin of victory	Runner(s)-up	Winner's share ($)
1	19 Sep 1999	Safeco Classic	69-68-70-64=271	−17	2 strokes	(Scotland) Catriona Matthew	97,500
2	7 Nov 1999	Mizuno Classic	70-64-67=201	−15	5 strokes	(England) Laura Davies (South Korea) Ok-Hee Ku (Japan) Fumiko Moriguchi (Japan) Aki Nakano	120,000
3	30 Sep 2007	Navistar LPGA Classic	70-67-70-67=274	−14	1 stroke	(United States) Stacy Prammanasudh	195,000
4	5 Dec 2010	LPGA Tour Championship	72-68-71-72=283	−5	1 stroke	(South Korea) Amy Yang	225,000
5	1 May 2011	Avnet LPGA Classic	70-74-67-67=278	−10	2 strokes	(South Korea) Song-Hee Kim	195,000

LPGA Tour playoff record (0–2)

No.	Year	Tournament	Opponent	Result
1	2000	Subaru Memorial of Naples	(United States) Nancy Scranton	Lost to par on second extra hole
2	2008	McDonald's LPGA Championship	(Taiwan) Yani Tseng	Lost to birdie on fourth extra hole

=== Ladies European Tour (2) ===
No.	Date	Tournament	Winning score	To par	Margin of victory	Runner-up	Winner's share
1	11 Jul 2004	Ladies English Open	66-67-64=197	−19	6 strokes	(Australia) Joanne Mills	£18,750
2	10 Jul 2005	Ladies English Open (2)	68-69-67=204	−12	1 stroke	(Finland) Minea Blomqvist	€24,750

Ladies European Tour playoff record (0–1)

No.	Year	Tournament	Opponent	Result	Ref
1	1999	McDonald's WPGA Championship	(England) Laura Davies	Lost to par on second extra hole	

=== Swedish Golf Tour (7) ===
No.	Date	Tournament	Winning score	To par	Margin of victory	Runner-up	Ref
1	28 Jul 1991	Aspeboda Ladies Open (as an amateur)	70-73-75=218	+2	7 strokes	(Sweden) Ulrika Johansson (a)	
2	1 Aug 1993	Aspeboda Ladies Open (2) (as an amateur)	77-73-75=225	+9	1 stroke	(Sweden) Carin Hjalmarsson	
3	11 Sep 1993	SM Match Play (as an amateur)	19th			(Sweden) Jennifer Allmark	
4	7 Aug 1994	SM Match Play (2) (as an amateur)	19th			(Sweden) Charlotta Sörenstam (a)	
5	2 Jun 1996	Delsjö Ladies Open	77-72-72=221	+5	2 strokes	(Sweden) Helene Koch	
6	16 Jun 1996	Toyota Ladies Open	71-71-68=210	−6	11 strokes	(Sweden) Malin Landehag	
7	28 Jul 1996	Aspeboda Ladies Open (3)	71-71-72=214	−5	5 strokes	(Sweden) Linda Ericsson	

=== Other wins (1) ===
- 1997 A.V. Rubbish Classic (Players West Tour)

=== Legends of the LPGA wins (2) ===
Legend
Legends Tour major championships (2)
Other Legends Tour (0)

No.	Date	Tournament	Winning score	Margin of victory	Runner-up
1	15 Aug 2026	LPGA Legends Championship	−7 (68-70-68=206)	2 strokes	(United States) Angela Stanford
2	23 Aug 2026	U.S. Senior Women's Open	−6 (73-70-66-73=282)	2 strokes	(Sweden) Annika Sörenstam

== Results in LPGA majors ==
Tournament	1998	1999	2000
Kraft Nabisco Championship		T10	CUT
LPGA Championship	T16	T63	CUT
U.S. Women's Open		T8	CUT
du Maurier Classic	T41	T17	CUT

Tournament	2001	2002	2003	2004	2005	2006	2007	2008	2009
Kraft Nabisco Championship	T24	T36	T5	CUT		CUT	9	4	
LPGA Championship	T3	T22	CUT	CUT	71	T39	T33	2	T23
U.S. Women's Open	T19	CUT	CUT		CUT	T41	CUT	T51	CUT
Women's British Open ^	T25	CUT	CUT	69	CUT	T45	T2	T69	T11

Tournament	2010	2011	2012	2013	2014	2015	2016
Kraft Nabisco Championship		T19	T38	T69	CUT		CUT
LPGA Championship	CUT	T8	CUT	CUT	CUT	CUT	
U.S. Women's Open	T28	T34	CUT				CUT
Women's British Open	CUT	13	CUT			12	T65
The Evian Championship ^^						CUT	

^ The Women's British Open replaced the du Maurier Classic as an LPGA major in 2001
^^ The Evian Championship was added as a major in 2013

Top 10
Did not play

CUT = missed the half-way cut
"T" = tied for place

=== Summary ===
Tournament	Wins	2nd	3rd	Top-5	Top-10	Top-25	Events	Cuts made
ANA Inspiration	0	0	0	1	4	6	14	9
Women's PGA Championship	0	1	1	2	3	6	18	10
U.S. Women's Open	0	0	0	0	1	2	14	6
Women's British Open	0	1	0	1	1	5	14	9
The Evian Championship	0	0	0	0	0	0	1	0
du Maurier Classic	0	0	0	0	0	1	3	2
Totals	0	2	1	4	9	20	64	36

- Most consecutive cuts made – 6 (twice)
- Longest streak of top-10s – 1 (nine times)

== LPGA Tour career summary ==
Year	Tournaments played	Cuts made	Wins	2nd	3rd	Top 10s	Best finish	Earnings ($)	Money list rank	Scoring average	Scoring rank
1998	25	19	0	0	0	3	T5	133,943		72.08	
1999	31	29	2	1	1	8	1	572,940		71.09	
2000	28	15	0	1	0	2	2	181,939	50	73.05	
2001	29	24	0	4	2	9	2	848,195	5	71.46	
2002	22	17	0	1	0	2	T2	359,194	26	72.14	
2003	22	11	0	0	0	T5	T2	108,512	70	73.08	
2004	22	9	0	0	0	0	T17	44,074	123	73.08	154
2005	23	16	0	0	1	4	T3	242,371	51	71.36	35
2006	26	18	0	0	1	2	T3	299,634	44	72.20	48
2007	28	23	1	3	0	8	1	949,055	11	71.88	19
2008	22	20	0	1	0	4	2	588,396	31	71.76	24
2009	18	14	0	1	0	3	T2	428,935	32	71.02	14
2010	22	13	1	0	1	4	1	568,914	20	71.97	31
2011	20	20	1	0	0	6	1	630,320	17	71.51	16
2012	20	12	0	0	0	1	T9	98,971	79	73.56	95
2013	15	9	0	0	0	0	T30	39,238	106	72.56	71
2014	15	2	0	0	0	0	T69	6,497	154	74.73	153
2015	14	8	0	0	0	2	T4	172,308	73	72.33	73
2016	17	3	0	0	0	0	T54	14,213	154	73.77	147
2022	2	1	0	0	0	0	T67	3,239	197	74.17	n/a

- official through the 2022 season

== Team appearances ==
Amateur

- European Ladies' Team Championship (representing Sweden): 1993, 1995
- European Lady Junior's Team Championship (representing Sweden): 1992, 1994 (winners)
- Espirito Santo Trophy (representing Sweden): 1992, 1994

Professional

- Praia d'El Rey European Cup (representing Ladies European Tour): 1997, 1998 (tie), 1999 (winners)
- Solheim Cup (representing Europe): 2002, 2005, 2007, 2009, 2011 (winners)
- Lexus Cup (representing International team): 2007
- World Cup (representing Sweden): 2008

=== Solheim Cup record ===
Year	Total matches	Total W–L–H	Singles W–L–H	Foursomes W–L–H	Fourballs W–L–H	Points won	Points %
Career	21	6–10–5	0–4–1	4–3–1	2–3–3	8.5	40.5%
2002	3	1–2–0	0–1–0 lost to K. Robbins 5&3	0–0–0	1–1–0 lost w/ A. Sörenstam 2&1, won w/ I. Tinning 1 up	1.0	33%
2005	4	1–3–0	0–1–0 lost to N. Gulbis 2&1	1–1–0 won w/ L. Davies 2&1, lost w/ L. Davies 3&2	0–1–0 lost w/ I. Tinning 3&2	1.0	25%
2007	5	1–1–3	0–1–0 lost to P. Creamer 2&1	1–0–1 won w/ G. Nocera 3&2, halved w/ G. Nocera	0–0–2 halved w/ A. Sörenstam, halved w/ L. Wessberg	2.5	50%
2009	5	2–1–2	0–0–1 halved w/ C. Kerr	1–1–0 won w/ A. Nordqvist 3&2, lost w/ A. Nordqvist 1 dn	1–0–1 halved w/ C. Matthew, won w/ G. Nocera 1 up	3.0	60%
2011	4	1–3–0	0–1–0 lost to C. Kim 4&2	1–1–0 lost w/ A. Nordqvist 2&1, won w/ A. Nordqvist 3&2	0–1–0 lost w/ A. Muñoz 3&1	1.0	25%
