= Anna-Carin Jonasson =

Swedish professional golfer (born 1971)

Personal information
- Nationality: Sweden
- Born: 19 November 1971 (age 54) Landskrona, Sweden

Career
- Sport: Golf
- Turned professional: 1995
- Former tours: Ladies European Tour (1995–1997); Ladies Asian Golf Tour (1996–1998); Swedish Golf Tour
- Professional wins: 2

Anna-Carin Jonasson (born 19 November 1971) is a retired Swedish professional golfer. In 1994 she won the Spanish Ladies Amateur and a bronze medal at the Espirito Santo Trophy. She played on the Ladies European Tour and the Ladies Asian Golf Tour between 1995 and 1998.

== Amateur career ==
Jonasson had a successful amateur career and won the Finnish Ladies Open Amateur Championship in 1988 and was a semi-finalist at the 1992 SM Match Play. In 1994, she won the German Ladies Open Amateur Championship and the Spanish International Ladies Amateur Championship.

She represented the Continent of Europe at the 1993 Vagliano Trophy and finished 4th representing Sweden at the 1993 European Ladies' Team Championship. In 1994, she captained the winning Swedish team at the European Lady Junior's Team Championship and represented Sweden at the Espirito Santo Trophy at Golf National in Paris, France, where she finished as bronze medalist together with Sofie Eriksson and Maria Hjorth.

Jonasson played on the Swedish Golf Tour as an amateur and won the Rörstrand Ladies Open in 1994.

== Professional career ==
Jonasson turned professional and joined the Ladies European Tour in 1995. In her rookie season, she played 11 tournaments and finished 84th on the Order of Merit. In 1996, she played 15 tournaments and ended the season ranked 53rd, after finishing T5 at the La Manga Spanish Open and T6 at Ladies English Open. In 1997, she recorded a T4 at the Ladies Swiss Open and a solo fifth place at the American Express Tour Player's Classic in England, and finished the season ranked a career high of 36th.

Jonasson also played on the Ladies Asian Golf Tour the 1996, 1997 and 1998 seasons, where she recorded a T3 at the 1996 Indonesian Ladies Open and a T3 again at the 1997 Philippine Toyota Ladies Open, two strokes behind winner Pernilla Sterner and one behind runner-up Åsa Gottmo.

After retiring from tour, Jonasson became a PGA Teaching Professional based in Malmö and changed to her married last name of Carlsson.

== Amateur wins ==
- 1988 Finnish Ladies Open Amateur Championship
- 1994 Spanish International Ladies Amateur Championship, German Ladies Open Amateur Championship

== Professional wins (2) ==
=== Swedish Golf Tour wins (2) ===
No.	Date	Tournament	Winning score	To par	Margin of victory	Runner-up	Ref
1	22 May 1994	Rörstrand Ladies Open (as an amateur)	217	+4	2 stroke	(Sweden) Helene Koch	
2	25 May 1997	Göteborgs Kex Ladies Open	71-72-70=213	−3	Playoff	(Sweden) Sara Melin	

== Team appearances ==
Amateur

- European Ladies' Team Championship (representing Sweden): 1993
- Vagliano Trophy (representing the Continent of Europe): 1993
- Espirito Santo Trophy (representing Sweden): 1994
