= Charlotta Sörenstam =

Swedish professional golfer (born 1973)

Personal information
- Full name: Petra Charlotta Sörenstam
- Nickname: Lotta
- Nationality: Sweden
- Born: 16 April 1973 (age 53) Stockholm, Sweden
- Height: 5 ft 7 in (1.70 m)

Career
- Sport: Golf
- College: University of Texas
- Turned professional: 1994
- Former tours: Ladies European Tour (1995–2008); LPGA Tour (1997–2006)
- Professional wins: 3

Number of wins by tour
- LPGA Tour: 1
- LPGA of Korea Tour: 1
- Other: 1

Best results in LPGA major championships
- Chevron Championship: 5th: 1999
- Women's PGA C'ship: T30: 2004
- U.S. Women's Open: T27: 2000
- du Maurier Classic: T14: 1998
- Women's British Open: T61: 2002
- Evian Championship: DNP

Achievements and awards
- Honda Broderick Award: 1993
- Mary Bea Porter Award: 2004

Petra Charlotta Sörenstam (born 16 April 1973) is a retired Swedish professional golfer. As an amateur competing for the Texas Longhorns, she won the NCAA Division I Championship individual title. As a professional, she won one tournament on the LPGA Tour and represented Europe in the Solheim Cup. Her elder sister by three years, Annika, is a Hall of Fame golfer.

== Early life ==
Sörenstam was born in Bro near Stockholm, Sweden. Her father Tom was an IBM executive and her mother Gunilla worked in a bank.

The Sörenstam family began playing golf at Viksjö Golf Club in Jakobsberg, north of Stockholm and later switched to nearby Bro-Bålsta Golf Club, opened in 1980, initially with a 9-hole course. At the age of 9, she shared her first set of golf clubs with her sister. Annika got the odd numbered clubs and Charlotta the even.

At the European Tour tournament Scandinavian Enterprise Open in Stockholm in July 1986, the Sörenstam sisters tried to be volunteer caddies and were asked to stand in a line with all other candidates. When all male volunteer caddies finally had been chosen by the tournament professionals, three teen-age girls were left without a bag yet. It was Charlotta, Annika and Fanny Sunesson.

== Amateur career ==
As an amateur, Sörenstam won the 1992 Ängsö Ladies Open on the professional Swedish Golf Tour, at the time named the Lancome Tour. She represented Sweden at the 1993 European Ladies' Team Championship in The Hague, Netherlands. She finished 5th at the 1993 individual European Ladies Amateur Championship in Turin, Italy.

In 1993, Sörenstam competed for the University of Texas at Austin in the United States. She won the 1993 individual NCAA Division I Championship title, two years after her elder sister won the same tournament. She also earned All-America honors. While at Texas, Sörenstam was named the winner of the Honda Sports Award for golf.

In 1994, Sörenstam was part of the winning Swedish team at the European Lady Junior's Team Championship at Gutenhof Golf Club, Austria. She also finished second, losing in the final to Maria Hjorth, at the Swedish Match-play Championship at Uppsala Golf Club on the Swedish Golf Tour.

== Professional career ==
Sörenstam turned professional at the end of the 1994 season and played on the Ladies European Tour in 1995 and 1996. At the end of 1996, she finished second at the LPGA Tour Final Qualifying Tournament to earn exempt status for 1997. She moved to the United States to play on the LPGA Tour, while continuing to play occasionally in Europe.

She has one LPGA Tour win, the 2000 Standard Register PING, and two runner-up finishes, the 1998 Friendly's Classic and 1999 The Philips Invitational. Annika and Charlotta Sörenstam became the first two sisters to both win $1 million on the LPGA Tour.

Her best finish in Europe is second, which she achieved at the 2005 Samsung Ladies Masters and consecutively at the McDonald's WPGA Championship of Europe at Gleneagles in 1996 and 1997.

Sörenstam received the 2004 Mary Bea Porter Award from the Metropolitan Golf Writers Association for saving Donna Caponi from choking during the 2003 LPGA Championship.

Sörenstam represented Europe in the Solheim Cup in 1998 and served as non-playing European captain for the European girls' team in the Junior Solheim Cup in 2005.

At the 2026 U.S. Senior Women's Open, Sörenstam shot a final round 69, the best score of the day, to finish tied 7th.

=== Instructor ===
From 2007 to 2016, Sörenstam was director of golf operations and head teaching professional at The Annika Academy, a luxury golf school located south of Orlando, Florida, run by Sörenstam's sister, Annika. The Annika Academy closed on 31 May 2016.

Sörenstam was also a recognized instructor for persons with lower back injuries. From 2018 to 2020 she was the director of instruction at Charlotte Harbor National Golf Club in North Port, Florida. Since 2021 she worked for the IMG Academy in Bradenton, Florida, as a performance golf coach.

== Awards and honors ==
- In 1993, she earned the Honda-Broderick Award in the golf category, bestowed to the top female collegiate golfer.
- In 2015, she was inducted into the University of Texas' Hall of Honor.

== Amateur wins ==
- 1993 NCAA Division I Championship Individual

== Professional wins (3) ==
=== LPGA Tour wins (1) ===
No.	Date	Tournament	Winning score	Margin of victory	Runner-up	Ref
1	19 Mar 2000	Standard Register PING	−12 (72-64-72-68=276)	2 strokes	(Australia) Karrie Webb	

=== LPGA of Korea Tour wins (1) ===
- 2001 Hyundai Securities Ladies Open

=== Swedish Golf Tour wins (1) ===
No.	Date	Tournament	Winning score	Margin of victory	Runner-up	Ref
1	14 Jun 1992	Ängsö Ladies Open (as an amateur)	72-69=141 (−3) (Note: Reduced to 36 holes due to thunderstorms)	Playoff	(Sweden) Maria Brink (a)	

Swedish Golf Tour playoff record (1–0)

No.	Year	Tournament	Opponent	Result	Ref
1	1992	Ängsö Ladies Open	(Sweden) Maria Brink (a)	Won with par on first extra hole	

== LPGA Tour career summary ==
Year	Wins	Earnings ($)	Money list rank	Scoring average
1997	0	118,195	60	72.32
1998	0	261,207	31	71.51
1999	0	233,954	36	71.62
2000	1	421,687	20	72.23
2001	0	132,917	69	72.80
2002	0	172,942	53	72.85
2003	0	62,920	103	73.17
2004	0	29,643	139	74.31
2005	0	55,125	107	74.29
2006	0	20,421	145	73.87
Career	1	1,509,011		

== Team appearances ==
Amateur

- European Girls' Team Championship (representing Sweden): 1991
- European Lady Junior's Team Championship (representing Sweden): 1992, 1994 (winners)
- European Ladies' Team Championship (representing Sweden): 1993

Professional

- Solheim Cup (representing Europe): 1998

=== Solheim Cup record ===
Year	Total matches	Total W–L–H	Singles W–L–H	Foursomes W–L–H	Fourballs W–L–H	Points won	Points %
Career	4	1–2–1	0–1–0	1–0–0	0–1–1	1.5	37.5%
1998	4	1–2–1	0–1–0 lost to K. Robbins 2&1	1–0–0 won w/ L. Davies 3&2	0–1–1 halved w/ L. Davies lost w/ L. Neumann 2&1	1.5	37.5%
