= Ängsö Ladies Open =

Golf tournament in Sweden, 1988–1994

Tournament information
- Location: Västerås, Sweden
- Established: 1988
- Course: Ängsö GK
- Tour: Swedish Golf Tour
- Format: 54-hole stroke play
- Prize fund: SEK 85,000
- Final year: 1994

Tournament record score
- Aggregate: 210 Carin Koch (1993)
- To par: −6 as above

Final champion
- (Sweden) Mia Löjdahl

The Ängsö Ladies Open was a women's professional golf tournament on the Swedish Golf Tour played annually from 1988 until 1994. It was always held at the Ängsö Golf Club in Västerås, Sweden.

== Winners ==
Year	Winner	Score	Margin of victory	Runner(s)-up	Prize fund (SEK)	Ref
1994	(Sweden) Mia Löjdahl (a)	212 (−4)	Playoff	(Sweden) Anna Berg	85,000	
1993	(Sweden) Carin Koch	210 (−6)	3 strokes	(Sweden) Catrin Nilsmark	85,000	
1992	(Sweden) Charlotta Sörenstam (a)	141 (−3)	Playoff	(Sweden) Maria Brink	85,000	
1991	(Sweden) Annika Sörenstam (a)	219 (+3)	2 strokes	(Sweden) Marie Wennersten	75,000	
1990	(United States) Leigh Ann Mills	223 (+7)	1 stroke	(Sweden) Pia Wiberg	75,000	
1989	(Sweden) Anna Oxenstierna	221 (+5)	1 stroke	(Sweden) Helen Alfredsson	75,000	
1988	(Sweden) Pia Nilsson	220 (+4)	3 strokes	(Sweden) Elisabet Johanson (Sweden) Helene Koch	50,000	
