= Sofia Grönberg-Whitmore =

Swedish golfer (born 1965)

Personal information
- Full name: Sofia Maria Grönberg Whitmore
- Nationality: Sweden
- Born: 25 May 1965 (age 61) Falköping, Sweden
- Spouse: John Whitmore

Career
- Sport: Golf
- College: University of Alabama
- Turned professional: 1988
- Former tour: Ladies European Tour (1989–2001)
- Professional wins: 8

Number of wins by tour
- Ladies European Tour: 3
- Ladies Asian Golf Tour: 1
- Other: 4

Achievements and awards
- Ladies Asian Golf Tour Order of Merit: 1989
- Swedish Golfer of the Year: 1989

Sofia Grönberg-Whitmore (born 25 May 1965) is a Swedish professional golfer. She played on the Ladies European Tour (LET) between 1989 and 2001 and won three LET titles. In 1989 she also won a title on the Ladies Asian Golf Tour and its Order of Merit.

Alongside Helen Alfredsson and Liselotte Neumann, Grönberg-Whitmore was one of the pioneers of women's professional golf in Sweden in the 1980s.

== Amateur career ==
She spent two years with the golf team at the University of Alabama and later married Englishman John Whitmore, residing in Warwickshire for part of her career.

As an amateur, she was part of the Swedish teams winning the 1984 European Lady Junior's Team Championship and the 1987 European Ladies' Team Championship. She played in the 1986 Espirito Santo Trophy in Caracas, Venezuela with Helen Alfredsson and Eva Dahllöf. In 1987 she played for Europe in the Vagliano Trophy.

== Professional career ==
Grönberg-Whitmore turned professional in 1988 and joined the Ladies European Tour. She won the 1988 IBM Ladies Open, a Swedish Golf Tour event that was added to the LET schedule two years later.

In early 1989, Grönberg-Whitmore played on the Ladies Asian Golf Tour, where she won the Indonesia Ladies Open and that season's Order of Merit. Back in Europe, she won the LET season opener, the Rome Classic, in April. At the end of the year, she was named Swedish Golfer of the Year.

Over the next decade, her best results were runner-up finishes at the La Manga Spanish Open and the Sens Ladies' Dutch Open, both in 1994. She returned to her winning ways in 1999. After triumphing both in the Air France Madame Biarritz Open and the inaugural Cantor Fitzgerald Laura Davies Invitational at Brocket Hall, she moved to fifth place on the LET Order of Merit and sixth spot on the European Solheim Cup ranking.

== Awards, honors ==
In 1988, she received Elit Sign number 86 by the Swedish Golf Federation on the basis of national team appearances and national championship performances.

She was named as the Swedish Golfer of the Year, male or female, professional or amateur, for the 1989 season.

In 2017, she was awarded honorary member of the PGA of Sweden.

== Professional wins (8) ==
=== Ladies European Tour (3) ===
No.	Date	Tournament	Winning score	Margin of victory	Runner-up
1	16 Apr 1989	Rome Classic	210 (−6)	1 stroke	(France) Marie-Laure Taya
2	30 Aug 1999	Laura Davies Invitational	275 (−13)	Playoff	(England) Trish Johnson
3	9 Oct 1999	Air France Madame Biarritz Open	200 (−10)	3 strokes	(France) Sandrine Mendiburu

=== Ladies Asian Golf Tour (1) ===
- 1989 Indonesia Ladies Open

=== Swedish Golf Tour (1) ===
No.	Date	Tournament	Winning score	Margin of victory	Runner-up
1	28 Aug 1988	IBM Ladies Open	224 (+5)	2 strokes	(Sweden) Maria Guslin (Sweden) Pia Nilsson

=== Other (3) ===
- 2005 Prins Bertils Pokal
- 2007 Prins Bertils Pokal
- 2010 Prins Bertils Pokal

== Team appearances ==
Amateur

- European Lady Junior's Team Championship (representing Sweden): 1984 (winners), 1986
- European Ladies' Team Championship (representing Sweden): 1985, 1987 (winners)
- Espirito Santo Trophy (representing Sweden): 1986
- Vagliano Trophy (representing the Continent of Europe): 1987

Professional

- Praia d'El Rey European Cup (representing Ladies European Tour): 1999 (winners)
