= Carin Koch =

Swedish professional golfer (born 1971)

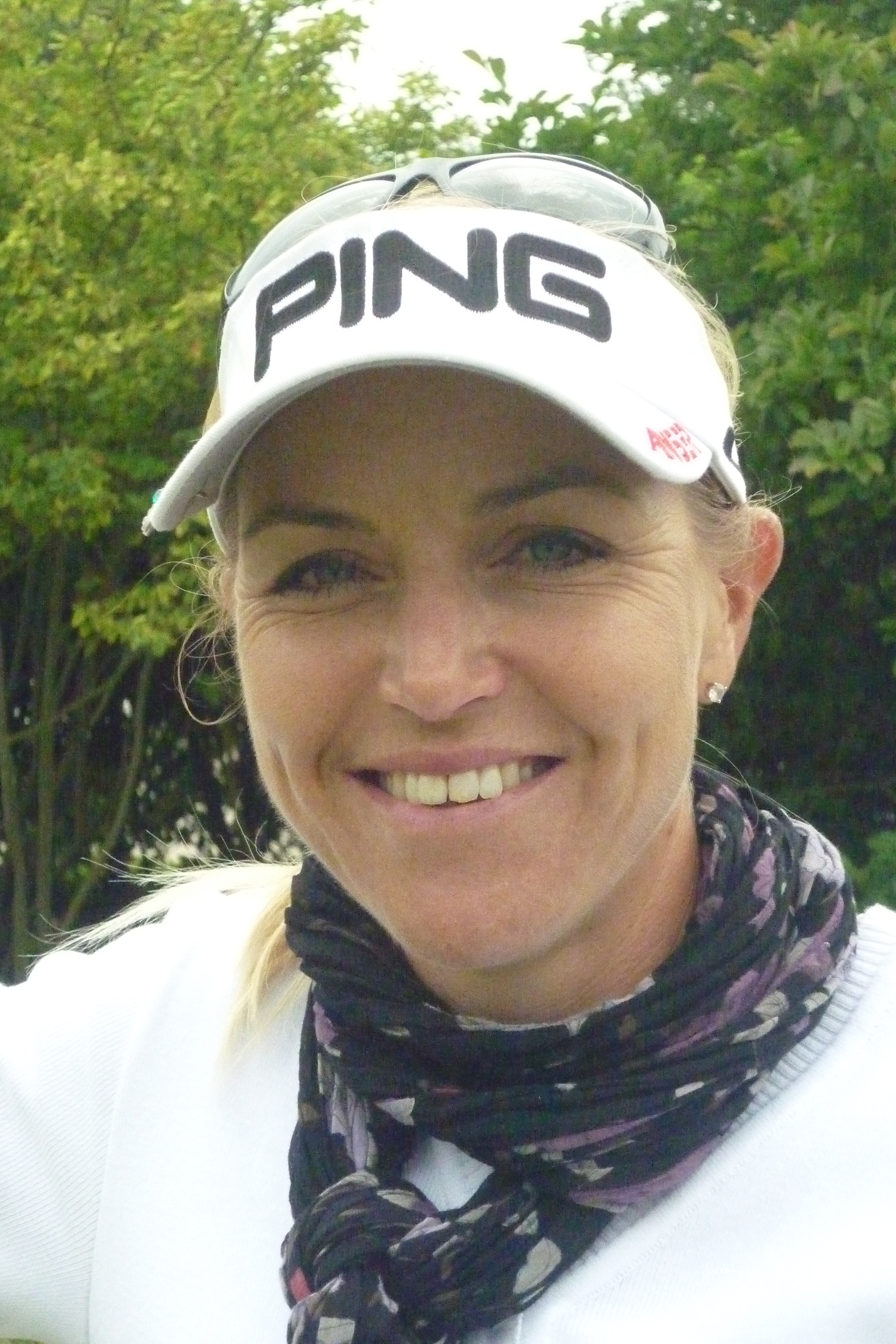
- Koch at the 2012 Dutch Ladies Open

Personal information
- Full name: Anna Carin Pernilla Hjalmarsson
- Nationality: Sweden
- Born: 23 February 1971 (age 55) Kungälv, Sweden
- Height: 5 ft 6 in (1.68 m)
- Life partner: Thomas Hedén
- Children: 2

Career
- Sport: Golf
- College: University of Tulsa
- Turned professional: 1992
- Former tours: LPGA Tour (joined 1995); Ladies European Tour (joined 1992)
- Professional wins: 10

Number of wins by tour
- LPGA Tour: 2
- Ladies European Tour: 1
- Other: 7

Best results in LPGA major championships
- Chevron Championship: T5: 2002
- Women's PGA C'ship: T6: 2002
- U.S. Women's Open: T5: 1999
- du Maurier Classic: T9: 1999
- Women's British Open: T8: 2002

Anna Carin Pernilla Hjalmarsson Koch (née Hjalmarsson; born 23 February 1971) is a Swedish professional golfer who previously played on the Ladies European Tour and on the U.S.-based LPGA Tour. She was captain of the 2015 European Solheim Cup team.

== Amateur career ==
Carin Koch had a successful amateur career. She represented Gullbringa Golf & Country Club, in Kungälv, north of Gothenburg, Sweden, just as elder Swedish female stars Kärstin Ehrnlund and Helen Alfredsson. She was the 1988 Swedish Junior 18 Match-play Champion. She represented Sweden on both junior level and in the national amateur team during the period 1988–1991. She was part of the winning Swedish team at the 1990 European Lady Junior's Team Championship at Shannon Golf Club on Ireland, with, among others, Annika Sörenstam.

Koch enrolled at the University of Tulsa and was named Second-Team All-American in 1990 and Scholar All-American in 1991.

Between 1987 and 1991 she played eight times on the Swedish Golf Tour, at the time named the Telia Tour, as an amateur, never finishing outside the top ten. She turned professional in 1992.

== Professional career ==
1992 was her rookie year on the Ladies European Tour. She won the Swedish Golf Tour (at the time named the Telia Tour) Order of Merit in both 1992 and 1993, winning three tournaments each year.

In 1994, she finished fourth on the Asian Order of Merit and tied for fifth at the LPGA Final Qualifying Tournament to earn exempt status for the 1995 LPGA season.

In 1995, her rookie season, her best LPGA finish was a tie for second at the JAL Big Apple Classic. She also gained two top ten finishes on the Ladies European Tour. In 1996 she almost gained her maiden LPGA victory, losing the Edina Realty Classic to Liselotte Neumann in a playoff.

In the 1999 Jamie Farr Kroger Classic, Koch had a two shot lead with just the final hole to play. Her caddie gave her the wrong club and she made a double bogey to drop into a six-way sudden death playoff, won by Se Ri Pak. In 2000, Koch won her maiden European title at the 2000 Chrysler Open. She was a member of the victorious European Solheim Cup Team, where she went 3-0 as a "rookie" and sank an eight-foot birdie putt on the 17th hole to win her match against Michele Redman to clinch the European Team's victory. She also teamed with Sophie Gustafson to win the inaugural TSN Ladies' World Cup of Golf.

In 2001, she became an LPGA maiden winner at the LPGA Corning Classic. At the start of 2002, Carin topped a Playboy internet poll as the sexiest women on the LPGA but declined to pose for them nude. This was the year Koch recorded a career-best 13 top-10 finishes, including three runner-up finishes and was a captain's pick for the European Solheim Cup team. In 2003, Koch gave birth to her second child, but still played well enough to be a captain's pick for the 2003 Solheim Cup, won by the Europeans in her native Sweden.

In 2005, she won her second career LPGA event at the Corona Morelia Championship. and was again a captain's pick for the 2005 Solheim Cup. She teamed up with Sophie Gustafson to represent Sweden at the inaugural Women's World Cup of Golf and was also a member of the International team at the inaugural Lexus Cup. She also played in the 2007 Women's World Cup of Golf with Helen Alfredsson.

In April 2014, Koch was named European team captain for the 2015 Solheim Cup. The 2015 match, played at Golf Club St. Leon-Rot, Germany, ended in a U.S. win 14½–13½, after a strong American come-back the last day.

In 2021 Koch fulfilled the age requirement for the U.S. Senior Women's Open, and gained exemption by virtue of her position on the LPGA Tour all-time money list.

== Personal life, awards, honors ==
In 1994, she earned Elite Sign No. 97 by the Swedish Golf Federation, on the basis of national team appearances and national championship performances.

In 2001, she was awarded honorary member of the PGA of Sweden.

As receipant number 27, she was in 2001 awarded the Golden Club by the Swedish Golf Federation for outstanding contributions to Swedish golf.

In 2014, Koch became an honorary member of Hills Golf and Sports Club in Mölndal, south of Gothenburg, Sweden, where she was appointed head of the Hills Business Club.

She was formerly married to golf professional Stefan Koch. During her LPGA Tour career, they lived in Phoenix, Arizona, United States, with their two children, Oliver and Simzon. She now lives in Mölndal, Sweden and uses her maiden name Carin Hjalmarsson.

== Amateur wins ==
- 1988 Swedish Junior Under 19 Championship

== Professional wins (10) ==
=== LPGA Tour wins (2) ===
No.	Date	Tournament	Winning score	Margin of victory	Runner(s)-up
1	27 May 2001	LPGA Corning Classic	−18 (68-67-69-66=270)	2 strokes	(Sweden) Maria Hjorth (Scotland) Mhairi McKay
2	24 April 2005	Corona Morelia Championship	−9 (68-69-71-71=279)	6 strokes	(France) Karine Icher

LPGA Tour playoff record (0–2)

No.	Year	Tournament	Opponents	Result
1	1996	Edina Realty LPGA Classic	(United States) Brandie Burton (Sweden) Liselotte Neumann (England) Suzanne Strudwick	Neumann won with birdie on third extra hole
2	1999	Jamie Farr Kroger Classic	(United States) Kelli Kuehne (Australia) Mardi Lunn (South Korea) Se-Ri Pak (United States) Sherri Steinhauer (Australia) Karrie Webb	Pak won with birdie on first extra hole

=== Ladies European Tour wins (1) ===
No.	Date	Tournament	Winning score	Margin of victory	Runner-up
1	4 Jun 2000	Chrysler Open	−11 (70-73-65-69=277)	4 strokes	(England) Samantha Head

=== Swedish Golf Tour wins (6) ===
No.	Date	Tournament	Winning score	Margin of victory	Runner-up	Ref
1	16 Aug 1992	Aspeboda Ladies Open	222 (+6)	3 strokes	(Sweden) Helene Koch	
2	9 Aug 1992	Swedish Matchplay Championship	1 hole		(Sweden) Margareta Bjurö	
3	23 Aug 1992	Conor Ladies Open	216 (E)	1 stroke	(Sweden) Helene Koch	
4	13 Jun 1993	Ängsö Ladies Open	210 (−6)	3 strokes	(Sweden) Catrin Nilsmark	
5	7 Aug 1993	Härjedalens Ladies Open	217 (+1)	1 stroke	(Sweden) Anna Berg	
6	29 Aug 1993	Sigtuna Ladies Open	209 (–7)	2 strokes	(Sweden) Anna-Carin Jonasson	

=== Other wins (1) ===
- 2000 TSN Ladies World Cup Golf (with Sophie Gustafson)

== Results in LPGA majors ==
Tournament	1995	1996	1997	1998	1999	2000
Kraft Nabisco Championship		CUT	CUT		CUT	T17
LPGA Championship	CUT	T18	T53	T18	T36	T40
U.S. Women's Open	T40	CUT		T13	T5	T31
du Maurier Classic	CUT	CUT	CUT	T63	T9	12

Tournament	2001	2002	2003	2004	2005	2006	2007	2008	2009	2010
Kraft Nabisco Championship	T15	T5		T16	T30	T24	T61	T63	CUT	T64
LPGA Championship	T17	T6		T11	T7	T49	CUT	CUT	T69	
U.S. Women's Open	CUT	T37	CUT	T10	CUT	T28	CUT	CUT	CUT	
Women's British Open ^	T56	T8	T50	T13	T15	CUT	CUT	CUT		T55

Tournament	2011	2012
Kraft Nabisco Championship		
LPGA Championship		
U.S. Women's Open		
Women's British Open ^	CUT	T43

^ The Women's British Open replaced the du Maurier Classic as an LPGA major in 2001.

Top 10
Did not play

CUT = missed the half-way cut.
"T" tied

=== Summary ===
- Starts – 58
- Wins – 0
- 2nd-place finishes – 0
- 3rd-place finishes – 0
- Top 3 finishes – 0
- Top 5 finishes – 2
- Top 10 finishes – 7
- Top 25 finishes – 19
- Missed cuts – 21
- Most consecutive cuts made – 9
- Longest streak of top-10s – 2 (twice)

== LPGA Tour career summary ==
Year	Wins	Earnings ($)	Money list rank	Average
1995	0	129,313	48	72.54
1996	0	128,772	50	73.26
1997	0	70,802	87	73.04
1998	0	207,432	35	72.34
1999	0	260,962	33	71.98
2000	0	329,377	28	72.40
2001	1	421,329	25	71.69
2002	0	785,817	8	70.91
2003	0	155,023	58	72.20
2004	0	568,404	20	71.04
2005	1	612,036	21	71.59
2006	0	223,664	60	72.61
2007	0	152,232	69	74.22
2008	0	313,468	54	72.58
2009	0	55,855	111	73.77
2010	0	10,882	n/a	74.00
2011	0	0	n/a	78.50
2012	0	14,564	138	75.75

== Team appearances ==
Amateur

- European Lady Junior's Team Championship (representing Sweden): 1988, 1990 (winners)
- European Ladies' Team Championship (representing Sweden): 1989, 1991

Professional

- Solheim Cup (representing Europe): 2000 (winners), 2002, 2003 (winners), 2005, 2015 (non-playing captain)
- Lexus Cup (representing International team): 2005 (winners), 2006
- World Cup (representing Sweden): 2005, 2007

=== Solheim Cup record ===
Year	Total matches	Total W–L–H	Singles W–L–H	Foursomes W–L–H	Fourballs W–L–H	Points won	Points %
Career	16	10–3–3	2–1–1	5–0–2	3–2–0	11.5	71.9%
2000	3	3–0–0	1–0–0 def M. Redman 2&1	1–0–0 won w/C. Nilsmark 2&1	1–0–0 won w/C. Nilsmark 2&1	3	100%
2002	5	4–0–1	0–0–1 halved w/ B. Daniel	2–0–0 won w/A. Sörenstam 3&2, won w/A. Sörenstam 4&3	2–0–0 won w/ M. McKay 3&2, won w/A. Sörenstam 4&3	4.5	90%
2003	4	1–2–1	0–1–0 lost to J. Inkster 5&4	1–0–1 halved w/L. Davies, won w/A. Sörenstam 3&2	0–1–0 lost w/A. Sörenstam 1dn	1.5	37.5%
2005	4	2–1–1	1–0–0 def M. Redman 2&1	1–0–1 halved w/C. Matthew, won w/ S. Gustafson 5&3	0–1–0 lost w/C. Matthew 1dn	2.5	62.5%
