= Helene Koch =

Swedish professional golfer (born 1967)

Heléne Koch
Personal information
- Full name: Heléne Elisabeth Koch
- Nationality: Sweden
- Born: 9 May 1967 (age 59)
- Spouse: Magnus Koch

Career
- Sport: Golf
- Turned professional: 1989
- Former tours: Ladies European Tour; Swedish Golf Tour
- Professional wins: 3

Heléne Elisabeth Koch (née Andersson) (born 9 May 1967) is a Swedish professional golfer. She played on the Ladies European Tour and was runner-up at the 1996 Costa Azul Ladies Open.

== Amateur career ==
Koch was a member of the winning Swedish team at the European Ladies' Team Championship at Turnberry in 1987, together with Helen Alfredsson, Eva Dahllöf, Pia Nilsson, Sofia Grönberg, Malin Landehag and Margareta Bjurö. She teamed up with Helen Alfredsson and Eva Dahllöf again for the 1988 Espirito Santo Trophy, held at Drottningholm in Stockholm, where they finished second after the United States, the best Swedish finish to date. In 1987, she represented the Continent of Europe in the Vagliano Trophy.

In 1986, Koch won the Finnish International Ladies Amateur Championship, and also the IBM Ladies Open on the Swedish Golf Tour (SGT), while still an amateur. Playing on the SGT, she was runner-up at the 1987 SI Trygg-Hansa Open behind Michiko Hattori and at the 1988 Ängsö Ladies Open, behind Pia Nilsson. In 1988, she won the Portuguese International Ladies Amateur Championship.

== Professional career ==
Koch turned professional in 1989 and joined the Ladies European Tour, where she finished third at the Godiva Ladies European Masters in Belgium, just missing out on the playoff between Kitrina Douglas and Marie-Laure de Lorenzi. On the 1992 SGT, she was runner-up at the Aspeboda Ladies Open and Conor Ladies Open, both behind Carin Koch.

On the 1996 Ladies European Tour, she was runner-up at the Costa Azul Ladies Open in Portugal, two strokes behind Shani Waugh, and finished 56th on the Order of Merit.

== Amateur wins ==
- 1986 Finnish International Ladies Amateur Championship
- 1987 Swedish Junior Match Play Championship
- 1988 Portuguese International Ladies Amateur Championship

== Professional wins (3) ==
=== Swedish Golf Tour (3) ===
No.	Date	Tournament	Winning score	To par	Margin of victory	Runner-up	ref
1	25 May 1986	IBM Ladies Open (as an amateur)	76-79-76=231	+15	1 stroke	(Sweden) Sofia Grönberg-Whitmore	
2	29 May 1994	Esab Ladies Open	219	+6	6 strokes	(Sweden) Carin Koch	
3	6 Sep 1998	Öhrlings Swedish Matchplay	3 and 2			(Sweden) Josefin Stålvant	

== Team appearances ==
Amateur

- Vagliano Trophy (representing Continent of Europe): 1987
- European Ladies' Team Championship (representing Sweden): 1987 (winners)
- Espirito Santo Trophy (representing Sweden): 1988
