= Marie Wennersten-From =

Swedish professional golfer (born 1958)

Personal information
- Full name: Marie Louise Inger Wennersten From
- Nationality: Sweden
- Born: 17 March 1958 (age 68) Uddevalla, Sweden

Career
- Sport: Golf
- Turned professional: 1982
- Former tours: Ladies European Tour; LPGA Tour
- Professional wins: 8

Number of wins by tour
- Ladies European Tour: 1
- Other: 7

Achievements and awards
- Swedish Golf Tour Order of Merit: 1990, 1991

Marie Louise Inger Wennersten From (born 17 March 1958) is a retired Swedish professional golfer who played on the Ladies European Tour and LPGA Tour.

== Early life and amateur career ==
Wennersten was born in Uddevalla on the west-coast of Sweden and played golf from age 10. As an amateur, representing Lyckorna Golf Club in Ljungskile south of Uddevalla, she won the Swedish Junior Match-play Championship in 1977 and the Swedish Match-play Championship in 1981, successfully defending the title in 1982. She represented Sweden at the European Lady Junior's Team Championship four times and was part of the Swedish team winning the 1978 event.

== Professional career ==
In 1984, Wennersten enjoyed a spell on the LPGA Tour, with a best finish of T38 at the MasterCard International Pro-Am. The following year she became the second Swedish golfer to win on the Ladies European Tour, after Kärstin Ehrnlund, when she won the Mitsubishi Colt Cars Jersey Open. She returned to Jersey two years later to win the Hong Kong Bank Jersey Classic, a non-tour event. She finished third at the 1985 British Women's Open at Moor Park Golf Club, 4 strokes behind Betsy King, and ended the season ranked 10th on the LET Order of Merit.

Wennersten won the Swedish Golf Tour Order of Merit in 1990 and 1991. She retired from tour in 1992 to become a PGA Club Professional, and has served as head pro at Örkelljunga Golfklubb, Lunds Akademiska Golfklubb and Örestads Golfklubb.

== Amateur wins ==
- 1977 Swedish Junior Match-play Championship
- 1981 Swedish Match-play Championship
- 1982 Swedish Match-play Championship

== Professional wins (8) ==
=== Ladies European Tour wins (1) ===
Year	Tournament	Winning score	To par	Margin of victory	Runner-up
1985	Mitsubishi Colt Cars Jersey Open	72-69-70=211	−2	2 strokes	(England) Kitrina Douglas

=== Swedish Golf Tour wins (6) ===
- 1987 (2) Höganäs Ladies Open, Aspeboda Ladies Open
- 1988 (2) Kanthal Höganäs Open, Aspeboda Ladies Open
- 1989 (1) Aspeboda Ladies Open
- 1991 (1) Grundig Team Trophy

=== Other wins (1) ===
Year	Tournament	Winning score	To par	Margin of victory	Runners-up
1987	Hong Kong Bank Jersey Classic	148	+4	1 stroke	(United States) Peggy Conley (Australia) Corinne Dibnah

== Team appearances ==
Amateur

- European Lady Junior's Team Championship (representing Sweden): 1975, 1977, 1978 (winners), 1979
