= 2000 Swedish Golf Tour (women) =

15th season of the Swedish Golf Tour (women)

2000 Swedish Golf Tour (women) season
- Duration: May 2000 – September 2000
- Number of official events: 11
- Most wins: 4: (Sweden) Lisa Hed
- Order of Merit: (Sweden) Susanne Westling

The 2000 Swedish Golf Tour, known as the Telia Tour for sponsorship reasons, was the 15th season of the Swedish Golf Tour, a series of professional golf tournaments for women held in Sweden and Finland.

Susanne Westling narrowly won the Order of Merit ahead of Lisa Hed despite Hed winning four tournaments, including the opening and closing events of the season.

== Schedule ==
The season consisted of eleven tournaments played between May and September, where one event was held in Finland.

Date	Tournament	Location	Winner	Score	Margin of victory	Runner(s)-up	Purse (SEK)	Note	Ref
15 May	Gula Sidorna Grand Opening	Fågelbro	(Sweden) Lisa Hed	141 (−1)	5 strokes	(Sweden) Mia Löjdahl (Sweden) Malin Tveit	100,000	Pro-am	
21 May	Trummenäs Ladies Open	Trummenäs	(Sweden) Sofie Eriksson	219 (+3)	1 stroke	(Sweden) Johanna Westerberg	100,000		
28 May	Mercedes-Benz Ladies Open	Albatross	(Sweden) Malin Landehag	151 (+7)	2 strokes	(Sweden) Nina Hansson (a)	100,000		
10 Jun	Toyota Ladies Open	Bokskogen	(Sweden) Malin Burström	221 (+5)	1 stroke	(Sweden) Susanna Hanson (a)	150,000		
18 Jun	Felix Finnish Ladies Open	Aura, Finland	(Sweden) Lisa Hed	209 (−7)	6 strokes	(Sweden) Mia Löjdahl (Sweden) Sara Eklund	150,000		
8 Jul	Vadstena Ladies Open	Vadstena	(Sweden) Susanne Westling	213 (E)	2 strokes	(Sweden) Anna Corderfeldt	150,000		
29 Jul	SI · Gefle Ladies Open	Gävle	(Sweden) Lisa Hed	214 (+1)	Playoff	(Finland) Riikka Hakkarainen	200,000		
3 Aug	SM Match	Ärila	(Sweden) Isabelle Rosberg	4&2		(Sweden) Emma Löfgren	150,000		
12 Aug	Skandia PGA Open	Forsgården	(Sweden) Malin Burström	217 (+1)	1 stroke	(Sweden) Anna Berg (Sweden) Linda Ericsson (Sweden) Pernilla Sterner	200,000		
2 Sep	Öijared Ladies Open	Öijared	(Sweden) Karin Sjödin (a)	219 (+3)	1 stroke	(Sweden) Isabelle Rosberg	150,000		
10 Sep	Gula Sidorna Ladies Finale	Bro-Bålsta	(Sweden) Lisa Hed	216 (−3)	4 strokes	(Sweden) Marie Hedberg	225,000		

National Championship tournaments

== Order of Merit ==
Rank	Player	Score
1	(Sweden) Susanne Westling	1,514
2	(Sweden) Lisa Hed	1,488
3	(Sweden) Isabelle Rosberg	1,043
4	(Sweden) Malin Burström	975
5	(Sweden) Susanna Gustafsson	927
6	(Sweden) Malin Tveit	798
7	(Sweden) Sara Eklund	786
8	(Sweden) Anna Corderfeldt	712
9	(Sweden) Cecilia Ekelundh	662
10	(Sweden) Malin Landehag	640

== See also ==
- 2000 Swedish Golf Tour (men's tour)
