= 1998 Swedish Golf Tour (women) =

13th season of the Swedish Golf Tour (women)

1998 Swedish Golf Tour (women) season
- Duration: May 1998 – September 1998
- Number of official events: 11
- Most wins: 2 (tie): (Sweden) Marie Hedberg (a) (Sweden) Pernilla Sterner
- Order of Merit: (Sweden) Nina Karlsson

The 1998 Swedish Golf Tour, known as the Telia Tour for sponsorship reasons, was the 13th season of the Swedish Golf Tour, a series of professional golf tournaments for women held in Sweden and Finland.

The tour extended to Finland for the first time with the inaugural Felix Finnish Ladies Open held at Aura Golf in Turku.

Pernilla Sterner and Marie Hedberg both won two tournaments and Nina Karlsson won her second Order of Merit.

== Schedule ==
The season consisted of 11 tournaments played between May and September, where one event was held in Finland.

Date	Tournament	Location	Winner	Score	Margin of victory	Runner(s)-up	Purse (SEK)	Note	Ref
31 May	Göteborgs Kex Ladies Open	Delsjö	(New Zealand) Lynnette Brooky	207 (−6)	Playoff	(Sweden) Malin Burström	150,000		
7 Jun	Toyota Ladies Open	Bokskogen	(Sweden) Marie Hedberg (a)	217 (+1)	Playoff	(Sweden) Anna Jönsson (a) (Sweden) Sara Melin	100,000		
28 Jun	Körunda Ladies Open	Nynäshamn	(Sweden) Pernilla Sterner	215 (−1)	1 stroke	(Norway) Line Berg (England) Claire Duffy	100,000		
4 Jul	Hook Ladies Open	Hook	(Sweden) Jessica Lindbergh (a)	211 (−5)	Playoff	(Finland) Riikka Hakkarainen (Sweden) Marlene Hedblom (Sweden) Sophie Gustafson	200,000		
2 Aug	Felix Finnish Ladies Open	Aura, Finland	(Sweden) Susanne Westling	218 (+2)	1 stroke	(Sweden) Maria Ekberg	150,000		
9 Aug	SI · Timrå Ladies Open	Timrå	(Sweden) Sara Jelander	225 (+9)	2 strokes	(Sweden) Maria Bodén (a) (Sweden) Rebecka Heinmert (a) (Sweden) Sofia Johansson (a)	150,000		
30 Aug	LB Data Ladies Open	Öijared	(Sweden) Nina Karlsson	211 (−5)	4 strokes	(Sweden) Malin Burström	100,000		
6 Sep	Öhrlings Match-SM	Varberg	(Sweden) Helene Koch	3&2		(Sweden) Josefin Stålvant	100,000		
13 Sep	Adapt Ladies Open	Upsala	(Sweden) Marie Hedberg (a)	213 (−3)	1 stroke	(Sweden) Nina Karlsson	100,000		
20 Sep	Swedish PGA Championship	Karlstad	(Sweden) Pernilla Sterner	283 (−5)	5 strokes	(Sweden) Mia Löjdahl	100,000		
27 Sep	Telia Ladies Finale	Johannesberg	(Sweden) Sophie Gustafson	205 (−11)	6 strokes	(Sweden) Anna Berg	225,000		

National Championship tournaments

== Order of Merit ==
Rank	Player	Score
1	(Sweden) Nina Karlsson	1,068
2	(Sweden) Marie Hedberg	1,035
3	(Sweden) Pernilla Sterner	963
4	(Sweden) Malin Burström	896
5	(Sweden) Sophie Gustafson	871
6	(Sweden) Susanne Westling	827
7	(Sweden) Riikka Hakkarainen	820
8	(Sweden) Linda Ericsson	726
9	(Sweden) Sara Jelander	707
10	(Sweden) Helene Koch	696

== See also ==
- 1998 Swedish Golf Tour (men's tour)
