= 1999 Swedish Golf Tour (women) =

14th season of the Swedish Golf Tour (women)

1999 Swedish Golf Tour (women) season
- Duration: May 1999 – September 1999
- Number of official events: 11
- Most wins: 2: (Sweden) Lisa Hed
- Order of Merit: (Sweden) Lisa Hed

The 1999 Swedish Golf Tour, known as the Telia Tour for sponsorship reasons, was the 14th season of the Swedish Golf Tour, a series of professional golf tournaments for women held in Sweden and Finland.

Lisa Hed won two tournaments and had two runner-up finishes, and won the Order of Merit ahead of Marie Hedberg.

== Schedule ==
The season consisted of eleven tournaments played between May and September, where one event was held in Finland.

Date	Tournament	Location	Winner	Score	Margin of victory	Runner(s)-up	Purse (SEK)	Note	Ref
10 May	Gula Sidorna Grand Opening	Fågelbro	(Sweden) Mia Löjdahl	145 (+3)	3 strokes	(Sweden) Anna Corderfeldt (Sweden) Lisa Hed	100,000	Pro-am	
6 Jun	Toyota Ladies Open	Bokskogen	(Sweden) Lisa Hed	216 (E)	2 strokes	(Sweden) Anna Berg	150,000		
13 Jun	Felix Finnish Ladies Open	Aura, Finland	(Sweden) Kristina Engström (a)	211 (−5)	1 stroke	(Sweden) Erica Steen	150,000		
20 Jun	Trummenäs Ladies Open	Trummenäs	(Sweden) Nina Karlsson	214 (−2)	1 stroke	(Sweden) Lisa Hed	100,000		
24 Jul	Gefle Ladies Open	Gävle	(Sweden) Hanna Hell	214 (−2)	Playoff	(Sweden) Susanna Hanson (a) (Norway) Suzann Pettersen	200,000		
1 Aug	SI · Timrå Ladies Open	Timrå	(Sweden) Eva-Lotta Strömlid	216 (E)	1 stroke	(Sweden) Karolina Andersson	100,000		
29 Aug	Skandia PGA Open	Haninge	(Sweden) Filippa Hansson (a)	219 (E)	Playoff	(Sweden) Marie Hedberg	150,000		
5 Sep	Öhrlings Match-SM	Degerberga	(Sweden) Filippa Helmersson	19th		(Sweden) Karolina Andersson	100,000		
12 Sep	LB Data Ladies Open	Öijared	(Sweden) Sara Eklund	212 (−1)	1 stroke	(Sweden) Linda Ericsson (Sweden) Susanna Gustafsson	150,000		
19 Sep	Bridgestone Ladies Open	Albatross	(Sweden) Lisa Hed	214 (−2)	4 strokes	(Sweden) Marie Hedberg	100,000		
26 Sep	Gula Sidorna Ladies Finale	Johannesberg	(Sweden) Malin Burström	212 (−4)	Playoff	(Sweden) Susanna Hanson	225,000		

National Championship tournaments

== Order of Merit ==
Rank	Player	Score
1	(Sweden) Lisa Hed	1,715
2	(Sweden) Marie Hedberg	1,016
3	(Sweden) Karolina Andersson	916
4	(Sweden) Sara Eklund	835
5	(Sweden) Susanna Berglund	765
6	(Sweden) Hanna Hell	659
7	(Sweden) Erica Steen	655
8	(Sweden) Filippa Helmersson	609
9	(Sweden) Nina Karlsson	598
10	(Sweden) Eva-Lotta Strömlid	580

== See also ==
- 1999 Swedish Golf Tour (men's tour)
