= 1997 Swedish Golf Tour (women) =

Twelfth season of the Swedish Golf Tour (women)

1997 Swedish Golf Tour (women) season
- Duration: May 1997 – September 1997
- Number of official events: 13
- Most wins: 2 (tie): (Sweden) Nina Karlsson (Sweden) Katharina Larsson (Sweden) Catrin Nilsmark
- Order of Merit: (Sweden) Nina Karlsson

The 1997 Swedish Golf Tour, known as the Telia InfoMedia Tour for sponsorship reasons, was the twelfth season of the Swedish Golf Tour, a series of professional golf tournaments for women held in Sweden.

Nina Karlsson won two tournaments and the Order of Merit ahead of Catrin Nilsmark.

== Schedule ==
The season consisted of 13 tournaments played between May and September, where one event was included on the 1997 Ladies European Tour.

Date	Tournament	Location	Winner	Score	Margin of victory	Runner(s)-up	Purse (SEK)	Note	Ref
25 May	Göteborgs Kex Ladies Open	Delsjö	(Sweden) Anna-Carin Jonasson	213 (−3)	Playoff	(Sweden) Sara Melin	100,000		
1 Jun	Rörstrand Ladies Open	Lidköping	(Sweden) Karolina Andersson	208 (−5)	2 strokes	(Sweden) Nina Karlsson	85,000		
7 Jun	Toyota Ladies Open	Bokskogen	(Sweden) Nina Karlsson	215 (−1)	1 stroke	(Sweden) Catrin Nilsmark	85,000		
15 Jun	Volvo Anläggningsmaskiner Open	Gumbalde	(Sweden) Tina Bergstrand	215 (+2)	Playoff	(Sweden) Lisa Hed	100,000		
29 Jun	Körunda Ladies Open	Nynäshamn	(Sweden) Nina Karlsson	217 (+1)	2 strokes	(Sweden) Maria Bodén (a)	100,000		
5 Jul	Hook Ladies Open	Hook	(Sweden) Åsa Gottmo	208 (−8)	6 strokes	(Sweden) Mia Löjdahl	200,000		
27 Jul	Aspeboda Ladies Open	Falun-Borlänge	(Sweden) Katharina Larsson	217 (+1)	5 strokes	(Finland) Riikka Hakkarainen	85,000		
10 Aug	SI Timrå Ladies Open	Timrå	(Sweden) Malin Tveit	227 (+11)	3 strokes	(Sweden) Maria Bodén (a)	150,000		
24 Aug	Compaq Open	Österåker	(Sweden) Annika Sörenstam	277 (−11)	6 strokes	(Sweden) Catrin Nilsmark	£300,000	LET event	
31 Aug	Lerum Ladies Open	Öijared	(Sweden) Catrin Nilsmark	209 (−7)	6 strokes	(Sweden) Sara Melin (Sweden) Susann Norberg (Sweden) Pernilla Sterner (Sweden) Malin Tveit	100,000		
7 Sep	Öhrlings Swedish Matchplay	Varberg	(Sweden) Catrin Nilsmark	3&2		(Sweden) Nina Karlsson	100,000		
13 Sep	Adapt Ladies Open	Upsala	(Sweden) Katharina Larsson	218 (+2)	1 stroke	(Sweden) Linda Ericsson	85,000		
21 Sep	Telia InfoMedia Ladies Finale	Johannesberg	(Sweden) Malin Burström	213 (−3)	2 strokes	(Sweden) Malin Tveit	213,000		

National Championship tournaments

== Order of Merit ==
Rank	Player	Score
1	(Sweden) Nina Karlsson	1,545
2	(Sweden) Catrin Nilsmark	1,263
3	(Sweden) Katharina Larsson	1,029

== See also ==
- 1997 Swedish Golf Tour (men's tour)
