= Swedish PGA Championship (women) =

Tournament information
- Location: Sweden
- Established: 1997
- Courses: Rotating; Elisefarm Golf Club (2026)
- Par: 72
- Tours: Swedish Golf Tour; LET Access Series
- Format: 54-hole stroke play (72-hole in 1998, 2006, 2025)
- Prize fund: €50,000
- Month played: June

Tournament record score
- Aggregate: 54 holes: 202 (2019); 72 holes: 279 (2025)
- To par: 54 holes: −14 (2019); 72 holes: −7 (2025)

Current champion
- (Sweden) Elsa Svensson

The Swedish PGA Championship for women is a golf tournament played annually in Sweden since 1997. It has been an event on the Swedish Golf Tour since inception and featured on the LET Access Series since 2012.

A corresponding Swedish PGA Championship for men has been played since 1970.

There is also a Swedish club pro PGA championship, limited to club professionals in Sweden, with separate competitions for men, women and senior men categories.

== Winners ==
Year	Tour(s)	Winner	Score	Margin of victory	Runner(s)-up	Purse (SEK)	Venue	Notes
PGA of Sweden Championship
2026	SGT · LETAS	(Sweden) Elsa Svensson	−7 (67-75-67=209)	2 strokes	(Switzerland) Natalie Armbruster	€50,000	Elisefarm Golf Club	
PGA of Sweden Championship Landeryd
2025	SGT · LETAS	(Austria) Katharina Mühlbauer	−7 (66-68-71-74=279)	3 strokes	(Sweden) Louisa Carlbom	600,000	Landeryd Golf Club	
PGA Championship Gothenburg
2024	SGT · LETAS	(Denmark) Natacha Host Husted	−2 (70-72-69=211)	2 strokes	(Germany) Helen Tamy Kreuzer	€40,000	Albatross Golf Club	
2023	SGT · LETAS	(Switzerland) Chiara Tamburlini	−12 (70-66-68=204)	5 strokes	(England) Emily Price	€40,000	Kungsbacka Golf Club	
PGA Championship Trelleborg
2022	SGT · LETAS	(Sweden) Meja Örtengren (a)	−2 (69-74-68=211)	Playoff	(Netherlands) Zhen Bontan	€50,000	Tegelberga Golf Club	
2021	SGT · LETAS	(Sweden) Maja Stark	−8 (67-70-68=205)	1 stroke	(England) Lily May Humphreys	€55,000	Tegelberga Golf Club	
2020	SGT · ~~LETAS~~ (Note: The 2020 tournament was removed from the LETAS schedule due to the COVID-19 pandemic.)	(Sweden) Elin Arvidsson	−8 (70-69-66=205)	1 stroke	(Sweden) Linda Lundqvist	250,000	Tegelberga Golf Club	
Scandic PGA Championship
2019	SGT · LETAS	(Norway) Tonje Daffinrud	−14 (66-70-66=202)	2 strokes	(Sweden) Johanna Gustavsson (Sweden) Maja Stark (a)	€42,000	Allerum Golf Club	
Säljfast Ladies PGA Championship
2018	SGT	(Sweden) Isabella Ramsay	−2 (74-73-67=214)	Playoff	(Sweden) Sofie Bringner	175,000	Sölvesborg Golf Club	
Forget Foundation PGA Championship
2017	SGT · LETAS	(France) Valentine Derrey	−6 (73-68-69=210)	1 stroke	(Sweden) Frida Gustafsson-Spång	€40,000	PGA Sweden National	
PGA Halmstad Ladies Open at Haverdal
2016	SGT · LETAS	(Spain) María Parra (a)	−9 (71-67-69=207)	2 strokes	(Scotland) Michele Thomson	€40,000	Haverdal Golf Club	(Note: Amateur winners received no prize money, which is distributed amongst the best placed professional(s).)
2015	SGT · LETAS	(Germany) Isi Gabsa	−5 (70-71-70=211)	3 strokes	(Sweden) Jessica Ljungberg	€35,000	Haverdal Golf Club	
Kristianstad Åhus Ladies PGA Open
2014	SGT · LETAS	(Sweden) Isabella Ramsay	−2 (73-70-71=214)	1 stroke	(Denmark) Emily Kristine Pedersen (a)	€30,000	Kristianstad Golf Club	
2013	SGT · LETAS	(Sweden) Linn Andersson (a)	+4 (69-74-77=220)	Playoff	(England) Eleanor Givens (Norway) Caroline Martens	€30,000	Kristianstad Golf Club	
Ljungbyhed Park PGA Ladies Open
2012	SGT · LETAS	(Scotland) Pamela Pretswell Asher (a)	−4 (73-72-67=212)	2 strokes	(Sweden) Isabella Deilert (a)	€30,000	Ljungbyhed Golf Club	
2011	SGT	(Sweden) Viva Schlasberg	−6 (71-70-69=210)	1 stroke	(Sweden) Maria Ohlsson	250,000	Ljungbyhed Golf Club	
VW Söderbergs Ladies Masters PGA Championship
2010	SGT	(Sweden) Johanna Johansson	−5 (70-70-71=211)	Playoff	(Sweden) Jacqueline Hedwall (a) (Sweden) Sanna Johansson (Norway) Cecilie Lundgreen (Sweden) Anna Tybring	250,000	Bråviken Golf Club	
PGA of Sweden National Open
2009	SGT	(Sweden) Elin Emanuelsson	−1 (71-74-70=215)	1 stroke	(Sweden) Therese Nilsson (Sweden) Malin Svedelius	225,000	PGA Sweden National	
PGA Open
2008	SGT	(Sweden) Catrin Nilsmark	+3 (74-74-71=219)	1 stroke	(Czech Republic) Zuzana Mašínová	300,000	Norrtelje Golf Club	
PGA Gibson Open
2007	SGT	(Sweden) Caroline Hedwall (a)	−3 (73-71-69=213)	5 strokes	(Norway) Marianne Skarpnord	150,000	International Golf Club	
PGA by Beirut Café and NAI Svefa
2006	SGT	(Sweden) Sofia Johansson	+11 (75-72-79-73=299)	Playoff	(Sweden) Eva Bjärvall (Sweden) Lena Tornevall	225,000	Herresta Golf Club	
Skandia PGA Open
2005	SGT	(Sweden) Nina Reis	E (70-73-67=210)	3 strokes	(Sweden) Nina Karlsson	360,000	Arlandastad Golf	
2004	SGT	(Sweden) Linda Wessberg	−3 (66-72-69=207)	1 stroke	(Sweden) Helena Svensson	360,000	Arlandastad Golf	
2003	SGT	(Sweden) Filippa Helmersson	−5 (69-70-69=208)	6 strokes	(Sweden) Åsa Gottmo	360,000	Falsterbo Golf Club	
2002	SGT	(Sweden) Helena Svensson (a)	+2 (71-73-74=218)	1 stroke	(Sweden) Nina Reis (Finland) Pia Koivuranta	300,000	Halmstad Golf Club	
2001	SGT	(Sweden) Maria Bodén	−7 (70-73-66=209)	4 strokes	(Sweden) Hanna Hell	250,000	Bokskogen Golf Club	
2000	SGT	(Sweden) Malin Burström	+1 (72-72-73=217)	1 stroke	(Sweden) Anna Berg	200,000	Forsgården Golf Club	
1999	SGT	(Sweden) Filippa Hansson (a)	E (72-73-74=219)	Playoff	(Sweden) Marie Hedberg	150,000	Haninge Golf Club	
Swedish PGA Championship
1998	SGT	(Sweden) Pernilla Sterner	−5 (70-70-70-73=283)	5 strokes	(Sweden) Mia Löjdahl	100,000	Karlstad Golf Club	
Aspeboda Ladies Open PGA Championship
1997	SGT	(Sweden) Katharina Larsson	+1 (72-72-72=217)	5 strokes	(Finland) Riikka Hakkarainen	85,000	Falun-Borlänge Golf Club	

(a) denotes amateur

== See also ==
- Swedish PGA Championship (men)
- List of sporting events in Sweden
