= 2009 Swedish Golf Tour (women) =

24th season of the Swedish Golf Tour (women)

2009 Swedish Golf Tour (women) season
- Duration: May 2009 – October 2009
- Number of official events: 14 (1 cancelled)
- Most wins: 2 (tie): (Sweden) Karin Börjeskog (Finland) Hanna-Leena Ronkainen (Italy) Anna Rossi
- Order of Merit: (Sweden) Karin Börjeskog

The 2009 Swedish Golf Tour, known as the SAS Masters Tour for sponsorship reasons, was the 24th season of the Swedish Golf Tour, a series of professional golf tournaments for women held in Sweden and Finland.

2009 was the second and final season with Scandinavian Airlines (SAS) as main sponsor, as the airline ran into financial difficulties due to the Great Recession. Purses were reduced and the LET event Göteborg Masters, where 25 places were reserved for players of the tour, was cancelled.

Karin Börjeskog, Hanna-Leena Ronkainen and Anna Rossi all won two events, and Börjeskog won the Order of Merit.

== Schedule ==
The season consisted of 14 tournaments played between May and October, where one event was held in Finland, and one was a Ladies European Tour event.

Date	Tournament	Location	Winner	Score	Margin of victory	Runner(s)-up	Purse (SEK)	Note	Ref
23 May	Dalsland Resort Ladies Open	Mellerud	(Finland) Hanna-Leena Ronkainen	210 (−3)	2 strokes	(South Africa) Tandi Cuningham	300,000		
30 May	Fredrik Jacobson Masters	Kungsbacka	(Sweden) Nina Reis	219 (+3)	6 strokes	(Sweden) Madeleine Augustsson	225,000		
5 Jun	IT-Arkitekterna Ladies Open	Botkyrka	(Sweden) Karin Börjeskog	225 (+3)	4 strokes	(Sweden) Josefin Leijon	250,000		
14 Jun	Felix Finnish Ladies Open	Aura, Finland	(South Africa) Tandi Cuningham	209 (−4)	2 strokes	(Norway) Cecilie Lundgreen (Sweden) Elena Perrone	300,000		
4 Jul	Körunda Ladies Open	Nynäshamn	(Denmark) Mette Beck Buus	211 (−5)	Playoff	(Sweden) Antonella Cvitan	200,000		
30 Jul	Smådalarö Gård Open	Smådalarö Gård	(Sweden) Karin Börjeskog			(Sweden) Åsa Gottmo (Sweden) Lisa Hed	300,000	(Note: Stableford tournament.)	
9 Aug	VW Söderberg Ladies Masters	Bråviken	(Sweden) Daniela Holmqvist (a)	213 (−3)	2 strokes	(Sweden) Sanna Johansson (Slovakia) Zuzana Kamasova	200,000		
~~16 Aug~~	Göteborg Masters	Lycke	Cancelled				€250,000	LET event	
22 Aug	SM Match	Örebro	(Sweden) Louise Larsson			(Denmark) Julie Tvede	200,000		
6 Sep	Svensk Biogas Masters	Landeryd	(Sweden) Emelie Lind	215 (−2)	Playoff	(Sweden) Lotta Wahlin (England) Emma Weeks	200,000		
11 Sep	Scandic Anglais Trophy	Täby	(Finland) Hanna-Leena Ronkainen	223 (+7)	7 strokes	(France) Frederique Dorbes	200,000		
18 Sep	Mölle Masters	Mölle	(Italy) Anna Rossi	212 (+2)	Playoff	(Sweden) Maria Ohlsson	200,000		
26 Sep	PGA of Sweden National Open	PGA Sweden National	(Sweden) Elin Emanuelsson	215 (−1)	1 stroke	(Sweden) Therese Nilsson (Sweden) Malin Svedelius	225,000		
10 Oct	Volkswagen Kallfors Open	Kallfors	(Italy) Anna Rossi	215 (−1)	2 strokes	(Sweden) Johanna Westerberg	250,000		

Swedish PGA Championship
Swedish Matchplay Championship

== Order of Merit ==
An official feeder tour for the Ladies European Tour, the top two finishers in the Order of Merit earned LET cards for 2010.

Rank	Player
1	(Sweden) Karin Börjeskog

== See also ==
- 2009 Swedish Golf Tour (men's tour)
