= Trummenäs Ladies Open =

Golf tournament

Tournament information
- Location: Karlskrona, Sweden
- Established: 1999
- Course: Trummenäs Golf Club
- Par: 72
- Tour: Swedish Golf Tour
- Format: 54-hole stroke play
- Prize fund: SEK 200,000
- Final year: 2003

Tournament record score
- Aggregate: 214 Nina Karlsson
- To par: –2 as above

Final champion
- (Sweden) Maria Ringdahl

The Trummenäs Ladies Open was a women's professional golf tournament on the Swedish Golf Tour, played between 1999 and 2003. It was always held at Trummenäs Golf Club near Karlskrona, Sweden.

The event was introduced in 1999 as one of the season's four new tournaments, alongside the Telia Grand Opening, Gefle Ladies Open and Albatross Ladies Open.

== Winners ==
Year	Winner	Score	Margin of victory	Runner(s)-up	Prize fund (SEK)	Ref
2003	(Sweden) Maria Ringdahl (a)	221 (+5)	Playoff	(Sweden) Minea Blomqvist (a)	200,000	
2001–2002: No tournament
2000	(Sweden) Sofie Eriksson	219 (+3)	1 stroke	(Sweden) Johanna Westerberg	100,000	
1999	(Sweden) Nina Karlsson	214 (–2)	1 stroke	(Sweden) Lisa Hed	100,000	
