= 1995 Swedish Golf Tour (women) =

Tennth season of the Swedish Golf Tour (women)

1995 Swedish Golf Tour (women) season
- Duration: May 1995 – August 1995
- Number of official events: 6
- Most wins: 3: (Sweden) Mia Löjdahl
- Order of Merit: (Sweden) Åsa Gottmo

The 1995 Swedish Golf Tour, known as the Lancôme Tour for sponsorship reasons, was the tenth season of the Swedish Golf Tour, a series of professional golf tournaments for women held in Sweden.

1995 was the fifth and final year with Lancôme as the main sponsor. Fewer professionals than previously participated this season as all tournaments were scheduled opposite an LET event. Tournaments Ängsö Ladies Open, Esab Ladies Open and Härjedalen Ladies Open were discontinued, but Körunda Ladies Open and Sölvesborg Ladies Open were added to the schedule.

Amateur Mia Löjdahl won three tournaments, but ineligible for prize money and the OoM, Åsa Gottmo won her second straight Order of Merit.

== Schedule ==
The season consisted of 6 tournaments played between May and September, where one event was included on the 1995 Ladies European Tour.

Date	Tournament	Location	Winner	Score	Margin of victory	Runner(s)-up	Purse (SEK)	Note	Ref
21 May	Rörstrand Ladies Open	Lidköping	(Sweden) Sara Eklund (a)	222 (+9)	1 stroke	(Sweden) Åsa Gottmo (Finland) Riikka Hakkarainen (a)	85,000		
30 Jul	SI Aspeboda Ladies Open	Falun-Borlänge	(Sweden) Mia Löjdahl (a)	219 (+3)	Playoff	(Sweden) Pernilla Sterner	85,000		
13 Aug	SM Match	Skellefteå	(Sweden) Mia Löjdahl (a)	4&3		(Sweden) Nina Karlsson	100,000		
20 Aug	Körunda Ladies Open	Nynäshamn	(Sweden) Mia Löjdahl (a)	213 (−3)	9 strokes	(Sweden) Anna Berg (a) (Sweden) Katharina Larsson (Sweden) Helene Koch	85,000		
10 Sep	Trygg-Hansa Ladies Open	Haninge	(Sweden) Liselotte Neumann	281 (−11)	1 stroke	(Sweden) Annika Sörenstam	£115,000	LET event	
17 Sep	Sölvesborg Ladies Open	Sölvesborg	(Sweden) Anna Berg (a)	217 (+1)	Playoff	(Sweden) Malin Burström (Sweden) Åsa Gottmo	75,000		

National Championship tournaments

== Order of Merit ==
Rank	Player	Score
1	(Sweden) Åsa Gottmo	29,750
2	(Sweden) Pernilla Sterner	27,775
3	(Sweden) Malin Landehag	27,663

== See also ==
- 1995 Swedish Golf Tour (men's tour)
