= 2002 Swedish Golf Tour (women) =

17th season of the Swedish Golf Tour (women)

2002 Swedish Golf Tour (women) season
- Duration: May 2002 – September 2002
- Number of official events: 12
- Most wins: 2: (Sweden) Anna Becker
- Order of Merit: (Finland) Riikka Hakkarainen

The 2002 Swedish Golf Tour, known as the Telia Tour for sponsorship reasons, was the 17th season of the Swedish Golf Tour, a series of professional golf tournaments for women held in Sweden, Denmark and Finland.

Anna Becker won two events and Riikka Hakkarainen from Finland won the Order of Merit, the first non-Swedish season champion.

== Schedule ==
The season consisted of 12 tournaments played between May and September, where one event was held in Finland and one in Denmark.

Date	Tournament	Location	Winner	Score	Margin of victory	Runner(s)-up	Purse (SEK)	Note	Ref
15 May	Telia Grand Opening	Fågelbro	(Sweden) Nina Reis	145 (+5)	1 stroke	(Sweden) Karin Sjödin	100,000	Pro-am	
8 Jun	Kalmar Ladies Open	Kalmar	(Australia) Susie Mathews (a)	213 (−3)	Playoff	(Sweden) Åsa Gottmo (Sweden) Helena Svensson (a)	200,000		
16 Jun	Felix Finnish Ladies Open	Aura, Finland	(Sweden) Linda Ericsson	212 (−4)	1 stroke	(Finland) Riikka Hakkarainen	150,000		
29 Jun	SM Match	Kevinge	(Finland) Riikka Hakkarainen	4&3		(Sweden) Karolina Andersson	150,000		
7 Jul	Körunda Ladies Open	Nynäshamn	(Sweden) Nina Karlsson	210 (−6)	Playoff	(Finland) Riikka Hakkarainen	150,000		
13 Jul	Nykredit Ladies Open	Smørum, Denmark	(Sweden) Lisa Hed	211 (−5)	Playoff	(Sweden) Lisa Holm Sørensen	150,000		
27 Jul	Öijared Ladies Open	Öijared	(Sweden) Rind Åström	209 (−4)	3 strokes	(Sweden) Johanna Westerberg	200,000		
24 Aug	Skandia PGA Open	Bokskogen	(Sweden) Helena Svensson (a)	218 (+2)	1 stroke	(Finland) Pia Koivuranta (Sweden) Nina Reis	300,000		
1 Sep	SI · Gefle Ladies Open	Gävle	(Sweden) Anna Becker	209 (−7)	3 strokes	(Sweden) Marlene Hedblom	200,000		
7 Sep	Sparbanken Ladies Open	Sölvesborg	(Finland) Minea Blomqvist (a)	214 (−2)	1 stroke	(Sweden) Sara Eklund	150,000		
14 Sep	Rejmes Ladies Open	Norrköping	(Sweden) Anna Becker	211 (−8)	Playoff	(Sweden) Åsa Gottmo	150,000		
22 Sep	Telia Ladies Finale	Lund	(Sweden) Anna Corderfeldt	212 (−4)	2 strokes	(Sweden) Johanna Westerberg	300,000		

National Championship tournaments

== Order of Merit ==
Rank	Player	Score
1	(Finland) Riikka Hakkarainen	1,402
2	(Sweden) Anna Corderfeldt	1,149
3	(Sweden) Sara Eklund	1,122
4	(Sweden) Johanna Westerberg	1,090
5	(Sweden) Lisa Hed	1,081
6	(Sweden) Nina Karlsson	1,068
7	(Sweden) Anna Becker	980
8	(Sweden) Helena Svensson	967
9	(Sweden) Åsa Gottmo	938
10	(Sweden) Nina Reis	886

== See also ==
- 2002 Swedish Golf Tour (men's tour)
