= 1996 Swedish Golf Tour (women) =

Eleventh season of the Swedish Golf Tour (women)

1996 Swedish Golf Tour (women) season
- Duration: May 1996 – September 1996
- Number of official events: 10
- Most wins: 3: (Sweden) Maria Hjorth
- Order of Merit: (Sweden) Maria Hjorth

The 1996 Swedish Golf Tour was the eleventh season of the Swedish Golf Tour, a series of professional golf tournaments for women held in Sweden.

Maria Hjorth, in her rookie year as a professional, won three tournaments and the Order of Merit.

== Schedule ==
The season consisted of 10 tournaments played between May and September, where two events were included on the 1996 Ladies European Tour.

Date	Tournament	Location	Winner	Score	Margin of victory	Runner(s)-up	Purse (SEK)	Note	Ref
26 May	Rörstrand Ladies Open	Lidköping	(Sweden) Sophie Gustafson	217 (+4)	4 strokes	(Sweden) Maria Hjorth (Sweden) Petra Rigby	85,000		
2 Jun	Delsjö Ladies Open	Delsjö	(Sweden) Maria Hjorth	221 (+5)	2 strokes	(Sweden) Helene Koch	100,000		
6 Jun	Toyota Ladies Open	Bokskogen	(Sweden) Maria Hjorth	210 (−6)	11 strokes	(Sweden) Malin Landehag	100,000		
7 Jul	SI Körunda Ladies Open	Nynäshamn	(Sweden) Petra Rigby	215 (−1)	Playoff	(Sweden) Marlene Hedblom	85,000		
28 Jul	Aspeboda Ladies Open	Falun-Borlänge	(Sweden) Maria Hjorth	214 (−5)	5 strokes	(Sweden) Linda Ericsson	85,000		
10 Aug	Lerum Ladies Open	Öijared	(Sweden) Maria Bertilsköld	217 (+1)	Playoff	(Sweden) Sara Eklund (a)	100,000		
25 Aug	Trygg-Hansa Ladies Open	Haninge	(Sweden) Annika Sörenstam	279 (−13)	1 stroke	(England) Joanne Morley (England) Alison Nicholas	£125,000	LET event	
1 Sep	Compaq Open	Örebro	(Italy) Federica Dassù	279 (−13)	Playoff	(Sweden) Helen Alfredsson (Scotland) Kathryn Marshall	£100,000	LET event	
8 Sep	SM Match	Hook	(Sweden) Anna Berg (a)	6&5		(Sweden) Nina Karlsson	100,000		
14 Sep	Adapt Ladies Open	Upsala	(Sweden) Maria Bertilsköld	219 (+3)	Playoff	(Sweden) Nina Karlsson	85,000		

National Championship tournaments

== Order of Merit ==
Rank	Player	Score
1	(Sweden) Maria Hjorth	67,625
2	(Sweden) Maria Bertilsköld	67,025
3	(Sweden) Nina Karlsson	45,533

== See also ==
- 1996 Swedish Golf Tour (men's tour)
