= 2010 Swedish Golf Tour (women) =

25th season of the Swedish Golf Tour (women)

2010 Swedish Golf Tour (women) season
- Duration: May 2010 – October 2010
- Number of official events: 13
- Most wins: 4: (Finland) Kaisa Ruuttila
- Order of Merit: (Finland) Kaisa Ruuttila

The 2010 Swedish Golf Tour, known as the Nordea Tour for sponsorship reasons, was the 25th season of the Swedish Golf Tour, a series of professional golf tournaments for women held in Sweden and Finland.

2010 was the first of seven seasons with Nordea as the main sponsor of the Tour, after Scandinavian Airlines (SAS) pulled out as main sponsor after only two seasons. The schedule remained largely unchanged from 2009, but the LET event Göteborg Masters cancelled during 2009 did not return.

Kaisa Ruuttila from Finland won four events and the Order of Merit.

== Schedule ==
The season consisted of 13 tournaments played between May and October, where one event was held in Finland.

Date	Tournament	Location	Winner	Score	Margin of victory	Runner(s)-up	Purse (SEK)	Note	Ref
21 May	PayEx Invitational	Visby	(Sweden) Elin Andersson	219 (+3)	3 strokes	(Sweden) Sanna Johansson	200,000		
29 May	Fredrik Jacobson Masters	Forsgården	(Finland) Kaisa Ruuttila	221 (+5)	1 stroke	(Sweden) Marianne Andersson	200,000		
13 Jun	Felix Finnish Ladies Open	Aura, Finland	(Finland) Kaisa Ruuttila	217 (+4)	Playoff	(Norway) Cecilie Lundgreen (Sweden) Elena Perrone	300,000		
2 Jul	IT-Arkitekterna Ladies Open	Botkyrka	(United States) Mallory Fraiche	219 (E)	1 stroke	(Sweden) Malin Jansson	200,000		
10 Jul	Körunda Ladies Open	Nynäshamn	(Sweden) Lotta Wahlin	213 (−3)	3 strokes	(Sweden) Mikaela Parmlid	200,000		
29 Jul	Smådalarö Gård Open	Smådalarö Gård	(Sweden) Madeleine Augustsson			(Sweden) Elin Ohlsson	300,000	(Note: Stableford tournament.)	
8 Aug	PGA VW Söderberg Ladies Masters	Bråviken	(Sweden) Johanna Westerberg	211 (−5)	Playoff	(Sweden) Jacqueline Hedwall (a) (Sweden) Sanna Johansson (Norway) Cecilie Lundgreen (Sweden) Anna Tybring	250,000		
30 Aug	Dalsland Resort Ladies Open	Mellerud	(Sweden) Louise Larsson	201 (−12)	1 stroke	(Finland) Kaisa Ruuttila	300,000		
21 Aug	SM Match	Österåker	(Sweden) Lotta Wahlin	3 & 1		(Finland) Kaisa Ruuttila	200,000		
5 Sep	Landeryd Ladies Masters	Landeryd	(Finland) Kaisa Ruuttila	212 (−4)	7 strokes	(Sweden) Lotta Wahlin (Sweden) Sara Ardström	200,000		
10 Sep	Scandic Anglais Trophy	Waxholm	(Finland) Kaisa Ruuttila	218 (−1)	Playoff	(Sweden) Isabella Ramsay	200,000		
17 Sep	Mölle Masters	Mölle	(Denmark) Line Vedel Hansen	212 (+2)	8 strokes	(Sweden) Therese Nilsson	200,000		
2 Oct	Volkswagen Helsingborg Open	Vasatorp	(Sweden) Anna Tybring	227 (+11)	Playoff	(Finland) Sohvi Härkönen (Sweden) Erika Holmén (Sweden) Johanna Westerberg	250,000		

Swedish PGA Championship
Swedish Matchplay Championship

== Order of Merit ==
Rank	Player
1	(Finland) Kaisa Ruuttila

== See also ==
- 2010 Swedish Golf Tour (men's tour)
