= Svedala Ladies Open =

Tournament information
- Location: Svedala, Sweden
- Established: 1996
- Course: Bokskogen Golf Club
- Tour: Swedish Golf Tour
- Format: 54-hole stroke play
- Prize fund: SEK 300,000
- Final year: 2014

Tournament record score
- Aggregate: 208 Caroline Hedwall (2014)
- To par: −6 Maria Hjorth (1996)

Final champion
- (Sweden) Caroline Hedwall

The Svedala Ladies Open was a women's professional golf tournament on the Swedish Golf Tour played between 1996 and 2014. It was always held at the Bokskogen Golf Club in Svedala, Sweden.

== History ==
The tournament was first held in 1996 and ran for five consecutive seasons with Toyota as title sponsor. The inaugural event was won with a healthy margin by rookie professional Maria Hjorth, who went on to win the Order of Merit that year and joined the LPGA Tour in 1998. The tournament was discontinued when the venue instead hosted both the Swedish PGA Championship (women) and the men's Swedish PGA Championship, a Challenge Tour event, simultaneously in 2001.

The event briefly reappeared on the Swedish Golf Tour schedule again in 2013 and 2014 when it served as the season finale and was hosted by Peter Hanson.

== Winners ==
Year	Winner	Score	Margin of victory	Runner(s)-up	Prize fund (SEK)	Ref
Svedala Ladies Open
2014	(Sweden) Caroline Hedwall	–5 (67-69-72=208)	1 stroke	(Sweden) Johanna Björk	300,000	
2013	(Sweden) Julia Davidsson	+3 (73-75-71=219)	2 strokes	(Sweden) Linnea Torsson	300,000	
2001–2012: No tournament
Toyota Ladies Open
2000	(Sweden) Malin Burström	+5 (74-71-76=221)	1 stroke	(Sweden) Susanna Hanson (a)	150,000	
1999	(Sweden) Lisa Hed	E (70-71-75=216)	2 strokes	(Sweden) Anna Berg	150,000	
1998	(Sweden) Marie Hedberg (a)	+1 (74-73-70=217)	Playoff	(Sweden) Anna Jönsson (a) (Sweden) Sara Melin	100,000	
1997	(Sweden) Nina Karlsson	–1 (73-71-71=215)	1 stroke	(Sweden) Catrin Nilsmark	85,000	
1996	(Sweden) Maria Hjorth	–6 (71-71-68=210)	11 strokes	(Sweden) Malin Landehag	100,000	
