= Körunda Ladies Open =

Tournament information
- Location: Nynäshamn, Sweden
- Established: 1995
- Course: Nynäshamn Golf Club
- Par: 72
- Tour: Swedish Golf Tour
- Format: 54-hole stroke play
- Prize fund: SEK 200,000
- Month played: July
- Final year: 2011

Tournament record score
- Aggregate: 207 Nina Reis (2005)
- To par: −9 as above

Final champion
- (Finland) Kaisa Ruuttila

The Körunda Ladies Open was a women's professional golf tournament on the Swedish Golf Tour played between 1995 and 2011. It was always held near Nynäshamn just south of Stockholm, Sweden.

== Winners ==
Year	Venue	Winner	Score	Margin of victory	Runner(s)-up	Prize fund (SEK)	Ref
Körunda Ladies Open
2011	Nynäshamn	(Finland) Kaisa Ruuttila	−6 (68-71-71=210)	2 strokes	(Finland) Ursula Wikström	200,000	
2010	Nynäshamn	(Sweden) Lotta Wahlin	−3 (72-72-69=213)	3 strokes	(Sweden) Mikaela Parmlid	200,000	
2009	Nynäshamn	(Denmark) Mette Beck Buus	−5 (70-70-71=211)	Playoff	(Sweden) Antonella Cvitan	200,000	
2007–2008: No tournament
Körunda Ladies Club SGT Open
2006	Nynäshamn	(Sweden) Christine Hallström	–5 (69-72-70=211)	2 strokes	(Sweden) Sara Wikström	225,000	
HaningeStrand Club SGT Open
2005	HaningeStrand	(Sweden) Nina Reis	–9 (72-68-67=207)	9 strokes	(Sweden) Hanna-Sofia Leijon	100,000	
2003–2004: No tournament
Körunda Ladies Open
2002	Nynäshamn	(Sweden) Nina Karlsson	−6 (74-71-65=210)	Playoff	(Finland) Riikka Hakkarainen	150,000	
2001	Nynäshamn	(Denmark) Christina Kuld	−7 (64-71-74=209)	6 strokes	(Sweden) Maria Bodén	150,000	
1999–2000: No tournament
1998	Nynäshamn	(Sweden) Pernilla Sterner	−1 (70-71-74=215)	1 stroke	(Norway) Line Berg (England) Claire Duffy	100,000	
1997	Nynäshamn	(Sweden) Nina Karlsson	+1 (71-75-71=217)	2 strokes	(Sweden) Maria Bodén	100,000	
1996	Nynäshamn	(Sweden) Petra Rigby-Jinglöv	−1 (74-72-69=215)	Playoff	(Sweden) Marlene Hedblom	85,000	
1995	Nynäshamn	(Sweden) Mia Löjdahl (a)	−3 (73-68-72=213)	9 strokes	(Sweden) Anna Berg (Sweden) Katharina Larsson (Sweden) Helene Koch	85,000	
