= Capio Ögon Trophy =

Swedish golf tournament

Coordinates: 59.859°N 17.690°E

Tournament information
- Location: Uppsala, Sweden
- Established: 1996
- Course: Upsala Golf Club
- Par: 72
- Tour: Swedish Golf Tour
- Format: 54-hole stroke play
- Prize fund: €40,000
- Month played: July

Tournament record score
- Aggregate: 210 Linn Grant
- To par: –9 as above

Current champion
- (Denmark) Sofie Kibsgaard Nielsen

Location map
- Location in Europe

The Capio Ögon Trophy is a women's professional golf tournament on the Swedish Golf Tour, first played in 1996. It became a LET Access Series event in 2020. It is always held in Uppsala, Sweden.

Played at Upsala Golf Club, the club had previous experience hosting the Upsala Golf International on the Challenge Tour in 1992 and 1993.

The event was introduced on the 1996 Swedish Golf Tour as one of four new tournaments alongside Toyota Ladies Open, Öijared Ladies Open and Delsjö Ladies Open (last played in 1988).

In 1998, Marie Hedberg won while still a student at San Jose State, and only narrowly lost out on the Player of the Year title to runner-up Nina Karlsson.

In 2020, Linn Grant claimed her first professional victory at the event.

== Winners ==
Year	Tour(s)	Winner	Country	Score	Margin of victory	Runner(s)-up	Prize fund (SEK)	Venue	Ref
Capio Ögon Trophy
2023	SGT · LETAS	Sofie Kibsgaard Nielsen	Denmark	–1 (73-72-70=215)	Playoff	(Denmark) Natacha Host Husted (a) (Scotland) Hannah McCook	€40,000	Upsala Golf Club	
2022: No tournament
GolfUppsala Open
2021	SGT · LETAS	Kajsa Arwefjäll (a)	Sweden	–6 (69-72-72=213)	Playoff	(Sweden) Sofie Bringner	€40,000	GolfUppsala Söderby	
2020	SGT · ~~LETAS~~ (Note: Removed from LETAS schedule due to the COVID-19 pandemic.)	Linn Grant	Sweden	–9 (71-68-71=210)	1 stroke	(Sweden) Beatrice Wallin (a)	250,000	GolfUppsala Söderby	
1999–2019: No tournament
Adapt Ladies Open
1998	SGT	Marie Hedberg (a)	Sweden	–3 (67-73-73=213)	1 stroke	(Sweden) Nina Karlsson	100,000	Upsala Golf Club	
1997	SGT	Katharina Larsson	Sweden	+2 (73-73-72=218)	1 stroke	(Sweden) Linda Ericsson	85,000	Upsala Golf Club	
1996	SGT	Maria Bertilsköld	Sweden	+3 (75-67-77=219)	Playoff	(Sweden) Nina Karlsson	85,000	Upsala Golf Club	

== See also ==
- Upsala Golf International – men's event (Challenge Tour)
