= Mölle Masters =

Tournament information
- Location: Höganäs, Sweden
- Established: 2008
- Course: Mölle Golf Club
- Par: 72
- Tour: Swedish Golf Tour
- Format: 54-hole stroke play
- Prize fund: SEK 200,000
- Final year: 2011

Tournament record score
- Aggregate: 211 Emma Weeks
- To par: +1 as above

Final champion
- (Sweden) Johanna Johansson

The Mölle Masters was a women's professional golf tournament on the Swedish Golf Tour, played between 2008 and 2011. It was always held at Mölle Golf Club in Sweden.

The tournament was introduced in 2008, as part of the tour's overhaul in conjunction with the start of the SAS Masters Tour.

== Winners ==
Year	Winner	Score	Margin of victory	Runner(s)-up	Prize fund (SEK)	Ref
2011	(Sweden) Johanna Johansson	214 (+4)	2 strokes	(Sweden) Lotta Wahlin	200,000	
2010	(Denmark) Line Vedel Hansen	212 (+2)	8 strokes	(Sweden) Therese Nilsson	200,000	
2009	(Italy) Anna Rossi	212 (+2)	Playoff	(Sweden) Maria Ohlsson	200,000	
2008	(England) Emma Weeks	211 (+1)	Playoff	(Sweden) Eva Bjärvall	300,000	
