= Landeryd Ladies Masters =

Tournament information
- Location: Linköping, Sweden
- Established: 2008
- Course: Landeryd Golf Club
- Par: 72
- Tour: Swedish Golf Tour
- Format: 54-hole stroke play
- Prize fund: SEK 200,000
- Final year: 2010

Tournament record score
- Aggregate: 211 Johanna Westerberg (2008)
- To par: −5 as above

Final champion
- (Finland) Kaisa Ruuttila

The Landeryd Ladies Masters was a women's professional golf tournament on the Swedish Golf Tour, played between 2008 and 2010. It was held near Linköping, Sweden.

== Winners ==
Year	Winner	Score	Margin of victory	Runner(s)-up	Prize fund (SEK)	Ref
Landeryd Ladies Masters
2010	(Finland) Kaisa Ruuttila	212 (−4)	7 strokes	(Sweden) Lotta Wahlin (England) Sara Ardström	200,000	
Svensk Biogas Masters
2009	(Sweden) Emelie Lind	215 (−1)	Playoff	(Sweden) Lotta Wahlin	200,000	
2008	(Sweden) Johanna Westerberg	211 (−5)	7 strokes	(Sweden) Antonella Cvitan (England) Emma Weeks	300,000	
