= 2011 Swedish Golf Tour (women) =

26th season of the Swedish Golf Tour (women)

2011 Swedish Golf Tour season
- Duration: May 2011 – October 2011
- Number of official events: 14
- Most wins: 2 (tie): (Sweden) Johanna Johansson (Sweden) Julia Davidsson
- Order of Merit winner: (Sweden) Maria Ohlsson

The 2011 Swedish Golf Tour, known as the Nordea Tour for sponsorship reasons, was the 26th season of the Swedish Golf Tour, a series of professional golf tournaments for women held in Sweden and Finland.

Johanna Johansson and Julia Davidsson both won two events, and Maria Ohlsson won the Order of Merit after four runner-up finishes.

== Schedule ==
The season consisted of 14 tournaments played between May and October, where one event was held in Finland.

Date	Tournament	Location	Winner	Score	Margin of victory	Runner(s)-up	Purse (SEK)	Note	Ref
14 May	Mölle Masters	Mölle	(Sweden) Johanna Johansson	214 (+4)	2 strokes	(Sweden) Lotta Wahlin	200,000		
20 May	St Ibb Ladies Open	St Ibb	(Sweden) Camilla Svensson	207 (−9)	Playoff	(Sweden) Maria Ohlsson (Sweden) Anna Dahlberg Söderström	200,000		
29 May	Ljungbyhed Park PGA Ladies Open	Ljungbyhed	(Sweden) Viva Schlasberg	210 (−6)	1 stroke	(Sweden) Maria Ohlsson	250,000		
12 Jun	Felix Finnish Ladies Open	Aura, Finland	(Sweden) Elin Andersson	211 (−2)	2 strokes	(Finland) Ursula Wikström	300,000		
1 Jul	IT-Arkitekterna Ladies Open	Botkyrka	(Sweden) Eva Bjärvall	217 (+1)	Playoff	(Sweden) Karin Börjeskog	200,000		
9 Jul	Körunda Ladies Open	Nynäshamn	(Finland) Kaisa Ruuttila	210 (−6)	2 strokes	(Finland) Ursula Wikström	200,000		
28 Jul	Smådalarö Gård Open	Smådalarö Gård	(Sweden) Johanna Johansson			(Sweden) Maria Ohlsson	200,000		
7 Aug	VW Söderbergs Ladies Masters	Bråviken	(Sweden) Camilla Lennarth (a)	216 (E)	Playoff	(Norway) Cecilie Lundgreen (Sweden) Madelene Sagström	200,000		
13 Aug	A6 Ladies Open	A6	(Sweden) Julia Davidsson	213 (−3)	2 strokes	(Sweden) Anna Dahlberg Söderström	200,000		
18 Aug	SM Match	Österåker	(Sweden) Cissi Wahlberg			(Sweden) Eva Bjärvall	200,000		
4 Sep	Norrporten Ladies Open	Sundsvall	(Sweden) Madeleine Augustsson	218 (+2)	1 stroke	(Norway) Cecilie Lundgreen	200,000		
10 Sep	ATG Trophy Waxholm	Waxholm	(Denmark) Daisy Nielsen (a)	207 (−12)	3 strokes	(Sweden) Maria Ohlsson	200,000		
18 Sep	Helsingborg Ladies Open	Vasatorp	(Sweden) Maria Bodén	222 (+6)	3 strokes	(Sweden) Eva Bjärvall (Sweden) Isabella Ramsay (Sweden) Camilla Svensson (United States) Mary Mattson (Sweden) Anna Dahlberg Söderström	200,000		
2 Oct	Nordea Tour Championship	Vallda	(Sweden) Julia Davidsson	212 (−4)	1 stroke	(Denmark) Daisy Nielsen (a)	300,000		

Swedish PGA Championship
Swedish Matchplay Championship
