= Ingarö Ladies Open =

Coordinates: 59.264°N 18.305°E

Tournament information
- Location: Ingarö, Stockholm, Sweden
- Established: 1993
- Course: Ingarö Golf Club
- Par: 70
- Tours: LET Access Series; Swedish Golf Tour
- Format: Stroke play
- Prize fund: €30,000
- Month played: August
- Final year: 2014

Tournament record score
- Aggregate: 203 Pamela Feggans
- To par: −13 as above

Final champion
- (Spain) Marta Sanz Barrio (a)

Location map
- Location in Europe

The Ingarö Ladies Open was a women's professional golf tournament on the Swedish Golf Tour and LET Access Series played between 1993 and 2014 near Stockholm, Sweden.

At the 2013 event Solheim Cup player Charlotta Sörenstam was in contention after opening rounds of 68 and 69, but had to settle for a tie for 7th after a final round of 75.

In 2014, 18-year-old Georgia Hall finished solo third in her professional debut, one stroke behind Caroline Rominger.

== Winners ==
| Year | Tours | Winner | Country | Score | Margin of victory | Runner(s)-up | Purse (SEK) | Venue | Note |
Ingarö Ladies Open hosted by Elin Emanuelsson
| 2014 | SGT · LETAS | Marta Sanz Barrio (a) | Spain | −6 (70-69-65=204) | 3 strokes | (Switzerland) Caroline Rominger | €30,000 | Ingarö | |
| 2013 | SGT · LETAS | Pamela Feggans | Scotland | −13 (69-67-67=203) | 4 strokes | (Sweden) Antonella Cvitan (Sweden) Madelene Sagström (a) | €30,000 | Ingarö | |
2012: No tournament
ATG Trophy Waxholm
| 2011 | SGT | Daisy Nielsen (a) | Denmark | −12 (71-68-68=207) | 3 strokes | (Sweden) Maria Ohlsson | 200,000 | Waxholm | |
Scandic Anglais Trophy
| 2010 | SGT | Kaisa Ruuttila | Finland | −1 (71-76-71=218) | Playoff | (Sweden) Isabella Ramsay | 200,000 | Waxholm | |
| 2009 | SGT | Hanna-Leena Ronkainen | Finland | +7 (72-75-76=223) | 7 strokes | (France) Frederique Dorbes | 200,000 | Täby | |
Kungsängen Queens Masters
| 2008 | SGT | Anna Becker | Sweden | +6 (71-71-74=216) | 3 strokes | (Sweden) Antonella Cvitan (Finland) Jenni Kuosa (Czech Republic) Zuzana Mašínová | 300,000 | Kungsängen | |
2007: No tournament
Avanza Lidingö Open
| 2006 | SGT | Emelie Leijon | Sweden | −9 (69-68-70=207) | 3 strokes | (Denmark) Mette Beck Buus | 200,000 | Lidingö | |
CA Ladies Trophy
| 2005 | SGT | Louise Friberg | Sweden | +7 (74-78-71=223) | 1 stroke | (Sweden) Lotta Wahlin | 150,000 | Brollsta/Ullna | |
| 2004 | SGT | Helena Alterby | Sweden | +1 (75-73-69=217) | 3 strokes | (Sweden) Helena Svensson | 150,000 | Brollsta/Ullna | |
| 2003 | SGT | Minea Blomqvist (a) | Finland | +2 (72-74=146) | 3 strokes | (Sweden) Emelie Leijon (Sweden) Erica Steen | 100,000 | Brollsta/Ullna | |
1994-2002: No tournament
Ingarö Ladies Open
| 1993 | SGT | Jennifer Allmark | Sweden | 227 (+14) | Playoff | (Sweden) Åsa Gottmo | 75,000 | Ingarö | |
