= 2005 Swedish Golf Tour (women) =

20th season of the Swedish Golf Tour (women)

2005 Swedish Golf Tour (women) season
- Duration: May 2005 – September 2005
- Number of official events: 15
- Most wins: 3: (Sweden) Anna Tybring
- Order of Merit: (Sweden) Nina Reis

The 2005 Swedish Golf Tour, known as the Telia Tour for sponsorship reasons, was the 20th season of the Swedish Golf Tour, a series of professional golf tournaments for women held in Sweden and Finland.

Anna Tybring won three events and Nina Reis won the Order of Merit.

== Schedule ==
The season consisted of 14 tournaments played between May and September, where one event was held in Finland.

Date	Tournament	Location	Winner	Score	Margin of victory	Runner(s)-up	Purse (SEK)	Note	Ref
10 May	Telia Grand Opening	Varberg	(Sweden) Anna Berg	143 (+3)	Playoff	(Sweden) Anna Nordqvist (a)	110,000	Pro-am	
27 May	Booz Allen Nordic Classic	Mälarö	(Sweden) Lotta Wahlin	140 (−4)	4 strokes	(Sweden) Anna Berg	100,000	Pro-am	
11 Jun	Gullbergs Ladies Open	Ängelholm	(Sweden) Anna Nordqvist (a)	213 (E)	3 strokes	(Norway) Line Berg (Sweden) Eva Bjärvall (Sweden) Linda Lindell (Sweden) Nina Reis (Sweden) Anna Tybring	150,000		
20 Jun	Felix Finnish Ladies Open	Aura, Finland	(Sweden) Nina Reis	209 (−4)	3 strokes	(Finland) Riikka Hakkarainen	200,000		
2 Jul	SM Match	Kevinge	(Sweden) Louise Stahle (a)			(Sweden) Emelie Leijon	150,000		
9 Jul	Rejmes Ladies Open	Bråviken	(Sweden) Lotta Wahlin	212 (−2)	3 strokes	(Sweden) Mikaela Bäckstedt (Sweden) Caroline Larsson	150,000		
23 Jul	IT-Arkitekterna Ladies Open	Botkyrka	(Sweden) Mikaela Bäckstedt (a)	213 (E)	3 strokes	(Sweden) Golda Johansson (a) (Sweden) Nina Reis	150,000		
29 Jul	HaningeStrand Club SGT Open	HaningeStrand	(Sweden) Nina Reis	207 (−9)	9 strokes	(Sweden) Hanna-Sofia Leijon	100,000		
31 Jul	Smådalarö Gård Open	Smådalarö Gård	(Sweden) Anna Tybring			(Sweden) Nina Reis	100,000	(Note: Stableford tournament.)	
20 Aug	Skandia PGA Open	Arlandastad	(Sweden) Nina Reis	216 (E)	3 strokes	(Sweden) Nina Karlsson	360,000		
26 Aug	Swedish International	Vidbynäs	(Sweden) Anna Tybring	222 (+3)	3 strokes	(Sweden) Anna Becker (Sweden) Eva Bjärvall (Sweden) Hanna-Sofia Leijon	150,000		
3 Sep	Öijared Ladies Open	Öijared	(Sweden) Anna Tybring	210 (−6)	3 strokes	(Sweden) Anna Berg (Sweden) Nina Reis	200,000		
9 Sep	CA Ladies Trophy	Brollsta/Ullna	(Sweden) Louise Friberg	223 (+7)	1 stroke	(Sweden) Lotta Wahlin	150,000	Pro-am	
13 Sep	Beirut Café Ladies Trophy	Kungsängen	(Sweden) Hanna-Sofia Leijon	138 (−2)	1 stroke	(Sweden) Sofia Renell (Sweden) Anna Tybring	100,000		
30 Sep	Telia Ladies Finale	Bro-Bålsta	(Sweden) Anna Berg	215 (−1)	2 strokes	(Sweden) Anna Tybring	300,000		

National Championship tournaments

== See also ==
- 2005 Swedish Golf Tour (men's tour)
