= Ladies Finnish Open =

Tournament information
- Location: Turku, Finland
- Established: 1998
- Course: Pickala Golf
- Par: 72
- Tours: Ladies European Tour; LET Access Series; Swedish Golf Tour
- Format: Stroke play
- Prize fund: €300,000 (LET) €40,000 (LETAS)
- Month played: September
- Final year: 2023

Tournament record score
- Aggregate: 201 Carmen Alonso
- To par: −15 as above

Final champion
- (Spain) Carmen Alonso

The Ladies Finnish Open was a professional women's golf tournament held in Finland. It was played as part of the Swedish Golf Tour 1998–2011, the LET Access Series 2012–2019, and after a one-year hiatus, part of the Ladies European Tour between 2021 and 2023.

== History ==
Finland last hosted a Ladies European Tour event in the Ladies Finnish Masters (2005–2011).

Aura Golf, founded in 1958 and one of the oldest golf courses in Finland, hosted the event 15 times between 1998 and 2021, and was also home to a men's Gant Open on the 2015 Challenge Tour. The 2022 edition was held in Åland in recognition of the centennial of the Åland convention, before moving to the Seaside course at Pickala Golf in 2023.

In 2021, Finland native Matilda Castren claimed her maiden LET title at the event. She needed to secure a victory on the LET to become a member of the tour and be eligible for the 2021 European Solheim Cup Team.

== Winners ==
Year	Tour	Venue	Winner	Country	Score	Margin of victory	Runner(s)-up	Ref
Ladies Open by Pickala Rock Resort
2023	LET	Pickala Golf	Carmen Alonso	Spain	−15 (64-69-68=201)	1 stroke	(Sweden) Johanna Gustavsson	
Åland 100 Ladies Open
2022	LET	Åland GC	Anne-Charlotte Mora	France	−8 (70-70-68=208)	1 stroke	(Sweden) Lisa Pettersson	
Gant Ladies Open
2021	LET	Aura Golf	Matilda Castren	Finland	−5 (71-69-68=208)	3 strokes	(India) Tvesa Malik (Finland) Ursula Wikström	
2020	No tournament							
Viaplay Ladies Finnish Open
2019	LETAS	Messila Golf	Nina Pegova	Russia	−7 (67-72-70=209)	4 strokes	(Finland) Ursula Wikström (Finland) Anna Backman	
2018	LETAS	Messila Golf	Julia Engström	Sweden	−2 (71-72-71=214)	Playoff	(Finland) Sanna Nuutinen (Finland) Ursula Wikström (Sweden) Emma Nilsson (Malaysia) Ainil Johani Bakar	
EVLI Ladies Finnish Open
2017	LETAS	Hillside GC	Ursula Wikström	Finland	−12 (71-67-66=204)	2 strokes	(Finland) Sanna Nuutinen (Finland) Charlotte Thompson	
2016	LETAS	Hillside GC	Ainil Johani Bakar	Malaysia	E (69-69-75=213)	1 stroke	(Austria) Sarah Schober	
HLR Golf Academy Open
2015	LETAS	Hillside GC	Anne Van Dam	Netherlands	–6 (72-62-73=207)	3 strokes	(Sweden) Johanna Gustavsson	
2014	LETAS	Hillside GC	Emma Westin	Sweden	–11 (65-68-69=202)	11 strokes	(Scotland) Jane Turner	
2013	LETAS	Hillside GC	Nicole Broch Larsen	Denmark	–3 (72-70-68=210)	Playoff	(Spain) Patricia Sanz Barrio (Switzerland) Fabienne In-Albon	
Women's Bank Open
2012	LETAS	Hillside GC	Cecilie Lundgreen	Norway	–7 (68-69-69=206)	3 strokes	(Germany) Nina Holleder	
Felix Finnish Ladies Open
2011	SGT	Aura Golf	Elin Andersson	Sweden	−2 (68-73-70=211)	2 strokes	(Finland) Ursula Wikström	
2010	SGT	Aura Golf	Kaisa Ruuttila	Finland	+4 (73-73-71=217)	Playoff	(Sweden) Louise Larsson	
2009	SGT	Aura Golf	Tandi Cuningham	South Africa	−4 (68-70-71=209)	2 strokes	(Sweden) Elena Perrone (Norway) Cecilie Lundgreen	
2008	SGT	Aura Golf	Zuzana Mašínová	Czech Republic	−6 (73-69-65=207)	4 strokes	(England) Sarah Heath (Sweden) Lotta Lovén	
2007	SGT	Aura Golf	Marianne Skarpnord	Norway	−3 (71-69-70=210)	Playoff	(Australia) Wendy Berger	
2006	SGT	Aura Golf	Madeleine Holmblad	Sweden	−2 (68-72-71=211)	2 strokes	(Finland) Anna-Karin Salmén	
2005	SGT	Aura Golf	Nina Reis	Sweden	−4 (68-72-69=209)	3 strokes	(Finland) Riikka Hakkarainen	
2004	SGT	Aura Golf	Hanna-Leena Ronkainen	Finland	−8 (65-71-69=205)	2 strokes	(Finland) Minea Blomqvist	
2003	SGT	Aura Golf	Linda Wessberg	Sweden	Par (72-73-71=216)	2 strokes	(Finland) Hanna-Leena Ronkainen (Finland) Jenni Kuosa	
2002	SGT	Aura Golf	Linda Ericsson	Sweden	−4 (72-71-69=212)	1 stroke	(Finland) Riikka Hakkarainen	
2001	SGT	Aura Golf	Pernilla Sterner	Sweden	−5 (70-70-71=211)	3 strokes	(Sweden) Linda Ericsson	
2000	SGT	Aura Golf	Lisa Hed	Sweden	−7 (68-74-67=209)	6 strokes	(Sweden) Mia Löjdahl (Sweden) Sara Eklund	
1999	SGT	Aura Golf	Kristina Tucker Engström	Sweden	−5 (70-73-68=211)	1 stroke	(Sweden) Erica Steen	
1998	SGT	Aura Golf	Susanne Westling	Sweden	+2 (73-71-74=218)	1 stroke	(Sweden) Maria Ekberg	

== See also ==
- Ladies Finnish Masters
- Finnish Challenge
