= Hanna-Leena Ronkainen =

Finnish professional golfer

Personal information
- Nationality: Finland
- Born: 1980 (age 45–46) Kotka, Finland

Career
- Sport: Golf
- Turned professional: 2006
- Former tours: Ladies European Tour (joined 2007); Swedish Golf Tour (joined 2006)
- Professional wins: 3

Achievements and awards
- Kotka Athlete of the Year: 2006

Hanna-Leena Ronkainen (née Salonen, born 1980) is a Finnish professional golfer who played on the Ladies European Tour (LET) between 2007 and 2010. She won the 2004 Ladies Finnish Open as an amateur.

== Amateur career ==
Ronkainen was born in Kotka and started playing golf at the age of 10. She joined the National Team at the age of 16 in 1997, and represented Finland in international competitions for the next 10 years. She appeared three times at the Espirito Santo Trophy and three times at the European Ladies' Team Championship. She won 21 medals at the Finnish Championship level, of which 10 were gold. In 2005 she won the Finnish Strokeplay Championship.

Ronkainen was runner-up at the 2003 Ladies Finnish Open at Aura Golf, two strokes behind Linda Wessberg. She won the event at the same venue in 2004, two strokes ahead of compatriot Minea Blomqvist. She made the cut and finished top-25 at the 2006 Ladies Finnish Masters at Helsinki Golf Club, an LET event.

== Professional career ==
Ronkainen turned professional at the end of 2006 after she earned a Ladies European Tour card at LET Q-School on her first attempt.

In her rookie season she finished tied 15th at both the SAS Masters and Nykredit Masters. In 2010, she recorded her first top-10 finish at the Deutsche Bank Ladies Swiss Open, six strokes behind winner Lee-Anne Pace.

In 2009 Ronkainen won two tournaments on the Swedish Golf Tour, the Dalsland Resort Ladies Open and Scandic Anglais Trophy, to finish second in the Order of Merit behind Karin Börjeskog and secure an LET card for 2010.

Ronkainen left the LET after the 2010 season to become a golf coach and promoter.

== Amateur wins ==
- 2005 Finnish Strokeplay Championship

== Professional wins (3) ==
=== Swedish Golf Tour wins (3) ===
No.	Date	Tournament	Winning score	To par	Margin of victory	Runner-up	Ref
1	20 Jun 2004	Felix Finnish Ladies Open (as an amateur)	65-71-69=205	–8	2 strokes	(Finland) Minea Blomqvist	
2	23 May 2009	Dalsland Resort Ladies Open	70-69-71=210	–3	2 strokes	(South Africa) Tandi Cuningham	
3	11 Sep 2009	Scandic Anglais Trophy	72-75-76=223	+7	1 stroke	(France) Frederique Dorbes	

== Team appearances ==
Amateur

- Espirito Santo Trophy (representing Finland): 2000, 2004, 2006
- European Ladies' Team Championship (representing Finland): 2001, 2003, 2005
