= Ängelholm Ladies Open =

Golf tournament

Tournament information
- Location: Ängelholm, Sweden
- Established: 2005
- Course: Ängelholm Golf Club
- Par: 72
- Tour: Swedish Golf Tour
- Format: 54-hole stroke play
- Prize fund: SEK 150,000
- Final year: 2007

Tournament record score
- Aggregate: 206 Antonella Cvitan
- To par: −7 as above

Final champion
- (Sweden) Caroline Hedwall

The Ängelholm Ladies Open was a women's professional golf tournament on the Swedish Golf Tour, played between 2008 and 2010. It was always held in Ängelholm, Sweden.

Anna Nordqvist won the tournament in 2005, a full year before she joined Arizona State. After finishing runner-up in 2006 Caroline Hedwall won the tournament as part of her record four SGT victories in 2007, also a full year before she started at Oklahoma State.

== Winners ==
Year	Winner	Score	Margin of victory	Runner(s)-up	Prize fund (SEK)	Ref
Isover Ladies Open
2007	(Sweden) Caroline Hedwall (a)	209 (–4)	3 strokes	(Finland) Sohvi Härkönen	150,000	
Klitterbyn Ladies Open
2006	(Sweden) Antonella Cvitan	206 (–7)	1 stroke	(Sweden) Caroline Hedwall (a)	150,000	
Gullbergs Ladies Open
2005	(Sweden) Anna Nordqvist (a)	213 (E)	3 strokes	(Norway) Line Berg (Sweden) Eva Bjärvall (Sweden) Linda Lindell (Sweden) Nina Reis (Sweden) Anna Tybring	150,000	
