= 2014 Swedish Golf Tour (women) =

29th season of the Swedish Golf Tour (women)

2014 Swedish Golf Tour season
- Duration: May 2014 – October 2014
- Number of official events: 11
- Most wins: 1
- Order of Merit winner: (Sweden) Lina Boqvist

The 2014 Swedish Golf Tour, known as the Nordea Tour for sponsorship reasons, was the 29th season of the Swedish Golf Tour, a series of professional golf tournaments for women held in Sweden and neighboring countries.

== Schedule ==
The season consisted of 11 tournaments played between May and September, where one event was held in Norway.

Key

Regular events
National Championships

Date	Tournament	Venue	Winner	Runner(s)-up	Purse (SEK)	Tour (Note: A number of the tournaments also featured on the 2014 LET Access Series (LETAS))	Ref
17 May	Kristianstad Åhus Ladies PGA Open	Kristianstad	(Sweden) Isabella Ramsay	(Denmark) Emily Kristine Pedersen (a)	€30,000	LETAS	
23 May	Sölvesborg Ladies Open	Sölvesborg	(Sweden) Emma Westin	(Switzerland) Melanie Maetzler	€30,000	LETAS	
14 Jun	St Ibb Ladies Open	St Ibb	(Sweden) Caroline Hedwall	(Sweden) Natalie Wille	200,000		
19 Jun	Delsjö Ladies Open	Delsjö	(Sweden) Mikaela Parmlid	(Sweden) Emma Westin	200,000		
27 Jun	Frontwalker Ladies Open	Botkyrka	(Sweden) Natalie Wille	(Sweden) Sara Ardström	200,000		
9 Aug	Ingarö Ladies Open	Ingarö	(Spain) Marta Sanz Barrio (a)	(Switzerland) Caroline Rominger	€30,000	LETAS	
14 Aug	Ladies Norwegian Challenge	Losby, Norway	(Sweden) Emma Nilsson	(Norway) Rachel Raastad	€30,000	LETAS	
23 Aug	Onsjö Ladies Open	Onsjö	(Sweden) Lina Boqvist	(Sweden) Lynn Carlsson	€30,000	LETAS	
13 Sep	Norrporten Ladies Open	Sundsvall	(Sweden) Natalie Wille	(Sweden) Johanna Björk (Norway) Cecilie Lundgreen	200,000		
19 Sep	SM Match	Karlstad	(Sweden) Natalie Wille	(Sweden) Anna Dahlberg Söderström	250,000		
11 Oct	Svedala Ladies Open	Bokskogen	(Sweden) Caroline Hedwall	(Sweden) Johanna Björk	300,000		

== See also ==
- 2014 Swedish Golf Tour (men's tour)
