= Telia Grand Opening (women) =

Golf tournament in Sweden

Tournament information
- Location: Höllviken, Sweden
- Established: 1999
- Course: Ljunghusen Golf Club
- Par: 72
- Tour: Swedish Golf Tour
- Format: 54-hole stroke play
- Prize fund: SEK 150,000
- Final year: 2007

Tournament record score
- Aggregate: 140 Pernilla Sterner (2001)
- To par: −2 as above

Final champion
- (United States) Jennifer Karr

The Telia Grand Opening was a women's professional golf tournament on the Swedish Golf Tour, played as the season opening event between 1999 and 2007.

The tournament was until 2006 a pro-am with a limited field of 32, played jointly with the men's Swedish Golf Tour.

It was discontinued as part of the tour's major overhaul ahead of the introduction of the SAS Masters Tour in 2008.

Two players managed to defend their titles, Nina Reis and Anna Berg.

== Winners ==
Year	Venue	Winner	Score	Margin of victory	Runner(s)-up	Prize fund (SEK)	Ref
Telia Grand Opening
2007	Ljunghusen	(United States) Jennifer Karr	221 (+5)	Playoff	(Denmark) Julie Tvede	150,000	
2006	Varberg	(Sweden) Anna Berg	151 (+7)	2 strokes	(Sweden) Hanna-Sofia Leijon	150,000	
2005	Varberg	(Sweden) Anna Berg	143 (+3)	Playoff	(Sweden) Anna Nordqvist (a)	110,000	
2004	Hovås	(Sweden) Antonella Cvitan	144 (+2)	1 stroke	(Denmark) Lisa Holm Sørensen	100,000	
2003	Fågelbro	(Sweden) Nina Reis	144 (+4)	1 stroke	(Sweden) Minea Blomqvist (a)	100,000	
2002	Fågelbro	(Sweden) Nina Reis	145 (+5)	1 stroke	(Sweden) Karin Sjödin	100,000	
2001	Fågelbro	(Sweden) Pernilla Sterner	140 (−2)	1 stroke	(Sweden) Åsa Gottmo	100,000	
Gula Sidorna Grand Opening
2000	Fågelbro	(Sweden) Lisa Hed	141 (−1)	5 strokes	(Sweden) Mia Löjdahl (Sweden) Malin Tveit	100,000	
1999	Fågelbro	(Sweden) Mia Löjdahl	145 (+3)	3 strokes	(Sweden) Anna Corderfeldt (Sweden) Lisa Hed	100,000	
