= Louise Larsson =

Swedish professional golfer (born 1990)

Personal information
- Nationality: Sweden
- Born: 30 July 1990 (age 36) Karlstad, Sweden

Career
- Sport: Golf
- Turned professional: 2010
- Former tours: Ladies European Tour (joined 2011); Swedish Golf Tour
- Professional wins: 2

Best results in LPGA major championships
- Chevron Championship: DNP
- Women's PGA C'ship: DNP
- U.S. Women's Open: DNP
- du Maurier Classic: DNP
- Women's British Open: CUT: 2012, 2013, 2014

Louise Larsson (born 30 July 1990) is a Swedish professional golfer. She won the 2010 European Ladies' Team Championship and played on the Ladies European Tour between 2011 and 2016.

== Amateur career ==
Larsson won the 2010 European Ladies' Team Championship at La Manga Club as part of the Swedish National Team alongside Camilla Lennarth and twins Jacqueline and Caroline Hedwall. The same year, she won the bronze at the Espirito Santo Trophy in Argentina together with Camilla Lennarth and Caroline Hedwall.

Playing on the Swedish Golf Tour, she won the 2009 SM Match Play and the 2010 Dalsland Resort Ladies Open, where she shot a new course record of 63, shooting 29 on the final 9 holes.

== Professional career ==
Larsson turned professional and joined the Ladies European Tour (LET) in 2011 after finishing fifth at the LET Final Qualifying School. On the LET, she kept her playing rights by comfortably finishing in the top 100 on the Order of Merit each year between 2011 and 2014, peaking at 57th in 2013. Her best LET finish came at the Omega Dubai Ladies Masters in 2013, where she finished tied 5th.

Larsson was runner-up at the 2010 Ladies Finnish Open. Her only appearances at an LPGA major were at the Women's British Open, where she played in 2012 at Royal Liverpool, 2013 at St Andrews, and 2014 at Royal Birkdale.

== Amateur wins (9) ==
- 2005 (2) FSB Tour Regional #1 – Örebro, FSB Tour Regional #5 – Östergötland
- 2006 (1) Peak Performance Junior Championship
- 2007 (1) Skandia Tour Elit Flickor #5
- 2008 (2) Skandia Tour Elit Flickor #4, Borås Junior Open
- 2009 (3) Schyberg Junior Open, John Bauer Junior Open, JSM Match Flickor

== Professional wins (2) ==
=== Swedish Golf Tour wins (2) ===
No.	Date	Tournament	Winning score	To par	Margin of victory	Runner-up	Ref
1	22 Aug 2009	SM Match Play (as an amateur)				(Denmark) Julie Tvede	
2	14 Aug 2010	Dalsland Resort Ladies Open (as an amateur)	77-78-67=222	+9	1 stroke	(Finland) Kaisa Ruuttila	

== Results in LPGA majors ==
Tournament	2011	2012	2013
Women's British Open	CUT	CUT	CUT

Note: Larsson only played in the Women's British Open.
CUT = missed the half-way cut

== Team appearances ==
Amateur

- European Girls' Team Championship (representing Sweden): 2008 (winners)
- European Ladies' Team Championship (representing Sweden): 2010 (winners)
- Espirito Santo Trophy (representing Sweden): 2010
