= 2026 Swedish Golf Tour (women) =

40th season of the Swedish Golf Tour (women)

2026 Swedish Golf Tour (women) season
- Duration: June 2026 – July 2026
- Number of official events: 2 (Note: A further 7 events of the Future Series count towards the Order of Merit)

The 2026 Swedish Golf Tour is the 41st season of the Swedish Golf Tour, a series of professional golf tournaments for women based in Sweden.

== Changes for 2026 ==
Title partner Ahlsell did not extend its four-year commitment, and the tour reverted to its original name. It is referred to as Damtouren to distinguish it from the men's Swedish Golf Tour.

Only two tournaments, the Swedish PGA Championship and the Swedish Strokeplay Championship, will feature on the 2026 schedule, down from four in 2025.

== Schedule ==
Key

Regular events
National Championships

Date	Tournament	Venue	Location	Winner	Purse (EUR)	Tour (Note: Tournaments are co-sanctioned by the LET Access Series (LETAS))	Ref
26 Jun	Swedish PGA Championship	Elisefarm Golf Club	Sweden	(Sweden) Elsa Svensson	50,000	LETAS	
3 Jul	Swedish Strokeplay Championship	GolfUppsala Söderby	Sweden	(Norway) Silje Torvund Ohma	50,000	LETAS	

== Future Series ==
A development circuit labelled as the Future Series, aimed at offering players more playing opportunities in the region, complements the main tour. For the first time in 2026, points earned on the Future Series count towards the tour's Order of Merit, and players must play a minimum of four Future Series events to be eligible for the tour's final season ranking prize money.

=== Schedule ===
The following table lists official events during the 2026 season.

Date	Tournament	Venue	Purse (SEK)	Winner
25 Apr	Abbekås Open	Abbekås Golf Club	20,000	(Sweden) Moa Fridell
17 Jun	NSGK by Dalaro	Norrköping Söderköping Golf Club	80,000	(Sweden) Tilde Löfman
11 Jul	Hagge Open	Hagge Golf Club	50,000	(Sweden) Malin Spångberg
2 Aug	Värmland Open	Sommarro Golf Club	30,000	Cancelled
16 Aug	Siljan Open	Rättvik Golf Club	40,000	(Sweden) Edit Hertzman
4 Sep	Septemberpokalen	Djursholm Golf Club	20,000	(Sweden) Elice Fredriksson
13 Sep	Falkenberg Open	Falkenberg Golf Club	20,000	(Sweden) Pennie Österberg

== Ranking ==
Rank	Player	Events	Result
1	(Sweden) Tilde Löfman	5	23,750
2	(Sweden) Elice Fredriksson	3	17,800
3	(Sweden) Edit Hertzman	4	14,800
4	(Sweden) Louise Hofgren	6	14,680
5	(Sweden) Moa Fridell	5	13,620

== See also ==
- 2026 Ladies European Tour
