= Lisa Hed =

Swedish professional golfer

Personal information
- Nationality: Sweden
- Born: 5 July 1973 (age 53)

Career
- Sport: Golf
- Turned professional: 1995
- Former tours: Ladies European Tour; Swedish Golf Tour
- Professional wins: 8

Best results in LPGA major championships
- Chevron Championship: DNP
- Women's PGA C'ship: DNP
- U.S. Women's Open: DNP
- du Maurier Classic: DNP
- Women's British Open: T60: 2001

Achievements and awards
- Swedish Golf Tour Order of Merit: 1999
- Telia Tour Award: 1999

Lisa Hed (born 5 July 1973) is a former Swedish professional golfer and Ladies European Tour player. She was runner-up at the 2000 Ladies Austrian Open and recorded 8 wins on the Swedish Golf Tour.

== Career ==
Hed turned professional in 1995 and joined the Swedish Golf Tour. In 1997, she came close to securing her maiden professional title, losing a playoff for the Volvo Anläggningsmaskiner Ladies Open. By 1999, she had hit her stride, recording nine top-10 finishes including two wins, and ended the 1999 season top of the Order of Merit. In 2000, she won four tournaments including the Felix Finnish Ladies Open, and in 2002, she won the Nykredit Ladies Open in Denmark.

Hed finished fifth at Q-School to join the Ladies European Tour in 2000. In the 2000 season on the LET, she only missed two cuts, at the Women's British Open and Ladies Italian Open, while recording top-10 finishes at the Ladies Irish Open and Ladies German Open, as well as a runner-up finish at the Ladies Austrian Open, one stroke behind Patricia Meunier-Lebouc. She finished 15th on the LET Order of Merit, but lost out on the Rookie of the Year award to 28th placed Giulia Sergas, on account of having started five LET tournaments in 1998.

In 2001, Hed made the cut at the 2001 Women's British Open at Sunningdale Golf Club. She recorded top-10 finishes at the Taiwan Ladies Open, WPGA Championship of Europe and Ladies German Open to finish 22nd in the LET Order of Merit.

Hed lost the final of the 2008 Swedish Matchplay Championship to Anna Nordqvist, and retired from tournament golf in 2010.

== Professional wins (8) ==
=== Swedish Golf Tour (8) ===
No.	Date	Tournament	Winning score	To par	Margin of victory	Runner(s)-up	Ref
1	6 Jun 1999	Toyota Ladies Open	70-71-75=216	E	1 stroke	(Sweden) Anna Berg (Germany) Elisabeth Esterl	
2	19 Sep 1999	Bridgestone Ladies Open	73-71-70=214	−2	4 strokes	(Sweden) Marie Hedberg	
3	15 May 2000	Gula Sidorna Grand Opening	72-69=141	−1	5 strokes	(Sweden) Mia Löjdahl (Sweden) Malin Tveit	
4	18 Jun 2000	Felix Finnish Ladies Open	68-74-67=209	−7	6 strokes	(Sweden) Sara Eklund (Sweden) Mia Löjdahl	
5	29 Jul 2000	SI · Gefle Ladies Open	67-72-75=214	+1	Playoff	(Finland) Riikka Hakkarainen	
6	10 Sep 2000	Gula Sidorna Ladies Finale	71-71-74=216	−3	4 strokes	(Sweden) Marie Hedberg	
7	13 Jul 2002	Nykredit Ladies Open	73-72-66=211	−5	Playoff	(Denmark) Lisa Holm Sørensen	
8	23 Sep 2006	Falköping Ladies Open	73-74-69 =216	E	1 stroke	(Sweden) Antonella Cvitan	
