= 2006 Swedish Golf Tour (women) =

21st season of the Swedish Golf Tour (women)

2006 Swedish Golf Tour (women) season
- Duration: May 2006 – October 2006
- Number of official events: 16
- Most wins: 2: (Sweden) Anna Berg
- Order of Merit: (Sweden) Christine Hallström

The 2006 Swedish Golf Tour, known as the Telia Tour for sponsorship reasons, was the 21st season of the Swedish Golf Tour, a series of professional golf tournaments for women held in Sweden and Finland.

Anna Berg was the only player to win two events, and Christine Hallström won the Order of Merit.

== Schedule ==
The season consisted of 16 tournaments played between May and October, where one event was held in Finland.

Date	Tournament	Location	Winner	Score	Margin of victory	Runner(s)-up	Purse (SEK)	Note	Ref
24 May	Telia Grand Opening	Varberg	(Sweden) Anna Berg	151 (+7)	2 strokes	(Sweden) Hanna-Sofia Leijon	150,000	Pro-am	
2 Jun	Booz Allen Nordic Classic	Mälarö	(Finland) Kaisa Ruuttila	142 (−2)	1 stroke	(Sweden) Hanna-Sofia Leijon	200,000	Pro-am	
11 Jun	Klitterbyn Ladies Open	Ängelholm	(Sweden) Antonella Cvitan	206 (−7)	1 stroke	(Sweden) Caroline Hedwall (a)	150,000		
18 Jun	Felix Finnish Ladies Open	Aura, Finland	(Sweden) Madeleine Holmblad	211 (−2)	2 strokes	(Finland) Anna-Karin Salmén (a)	200,000		
8 Jul	Gefle Ladies Open	Gefle	(Finland) Kaisa Ruuttila	208 (−8)	Playoff	(Austria) Katharina Werdinig	200,000		
15 Jul	IT-Arkitekterna Ladies Open	Botkyrka	(Sweden) Helena Svensson	220 (+1)	1 stroke	(Sweden) Eva Bjärvall (Sweden) Golda Johansson	150,000		
26 Jul	Smådalarö Gård Qtee Cup	Smådalarö Gård	(Sweden) Anna Tybring			(Sweden) Emelie Leijon	100,000	(Note: Stableford tournament.)	
30 Jul	SI Körunda Ladies Club SGT Open	Nynäshamn	(Sweden) Christine Hallström	211 (−5)	2 strokes	(Sweden) Sara Wikström	225,000		
5 Aug	Öijared Ladies Open	Öijared	(France) Frederique Dorbes	212 (−4)	2 strokes	(Sweden) Caroline Westrup	150,000		
19 Aug	Rejmes Ladies Open	Bråviken	(Sweden) Lotta Wahlin	211 (−5)	1 stroke	(Norway) Marianne Skarpnord	150,000		
25 Aug	SM Match	Gustavsvik	(Sweden) Caroline Hedwall (a)			(Sweden) Johanna Lundberg	150,000		
2 Sep	Avanza Lidingö Open	Lidingö	(Sweden) Emelie Leijon	207 (−9)	3 strokes	(Denmark) Mette Beck Buus	200,000		
9 Sep	PGA by Beirut Café and NAI Svefa	Herresta	(Sweden) Sofia Johansson	216 (E)	3 strokes	(Sweden) Eva Bjärvall (Sweden) Lena Tornevall	225,000		
23 Sep	Falköping Ladies Open	Vidbynäs	(Sweden) Lisa Hed	216 (E)	1 stroke	(Sweden) Antonella Cvitan	150,000		
1 Oct	Ekerum Ladies Masters	Ekerum	(Sweden) Cecilia Ekelundh	281 (−7)	1 stroke	(Sweden) Sanna Johansson (Sweden) Hanna-Sofia Leijon	300,000		
6 Oct	Telia Ladies Finale	Bro-Bålsta	(Sweden) Anna Berg	212 (−1)	Playoff	(Sweden) Caroline Hedwall (a)	300,000		

National Championship tournaments

== See also ==
- 2006 Swedish Golf Tour (men's tour)
