= 2007 Swedish Golf Tour (women) =

22nd season of the Swedish Golf Tour (women)

2007 Swedish Golf Tour (women) season
- Duration: May 2007 – October 2007
- Number of official events: 12
- Most wins: 4: (Sweden) Caroline Hedwall (a)
- Order of Merit: (Norway) Marianne Skarpnord

The 2007 Swedish Golf Tour, known as the Telia Tour for sponsorship reasons, was the 22nd season of the Swedish Golf Tour, a series of professional golf tournaments for women held in Sweden and Finland.

Amateur Caroline Hedwall won four events, and Norway's Marianne Skarpnord won the Order of Merit. Through her win, Skarpnord, along with Order of Merit runner-up Florence Lüscher from Switzerland, secured cards for the 2008 Ladies European Tour.

The tour enjoyed an international field and, in all, players of six different nationalities won titles, and a further four nationalities were runner-ups.

== Schedule ==
The season consisted of 12 tournaments played between May and October, where one event was held in Finland.

Date	Tournament	Location	Winner	Score	Margin of victory	Runner(s)-up	Purse (SEK)	Note	Ref
26 May	Telia Grand Opening	Ljunghusen	(United States) Jennifer Karr	221 (+5)	Playoff	(Denmark) Julie Tvede	150,000		
16 Jun	IT-Arkitekterna Ladies Open	Botkyrka	(Sweden) Josefin Leijon	216 (−3)	Playoff	(Japan) Rui Yokomine	150,000		
10 Jun	Isover Ladies Open	Ängelholm	(Sweden) Caroline Hedwall (a)	209 (−4)	3 strokes	(Finland) Sohvi Härkönen	150,000		
8 Jul	Felix Finnish Ladies Open	Aura, Finland	(Norway) Marianne Skarpnord	210 (−3)	Playoff	(Australia) Wendy Berger	300,000		
27 Jul	Smådalarö Gård Open	Smådalarö Gård	(Norway) Marianne Skarpnord			(Switzerland) Florence Lüscher	150,000	(Note: Stableford tournament.)	
4 Aug	SI Gefle Ladies Open	Gävle	(Sweden) Caroline Hedwall (a)	215 (−1)	Playoff	(Switzerland) Florence Lüscher	200,000		
18 Aug	Hotel Falköping Ladies Cup	Falköping	(Sweden) Caroline Hedwall (a)	143 (−1)	1 stroke	(Spain) Nuria Clau	150,000		
24 Aug	SM Match	Mosjö	(Denmark) Julie Tvede			(Sweden) Caroline Hedwall (a)	250,000		
2 Sep	Rejmes Ladies Open	Bråviken	(Switzerland) Florence Lüscher	292 (+4)	Playoff	(Slovenia) Zuzana Kamasova	150,000		
7 Sep	Ekerum Ladies Masters	Ekerum	(Norway) Marianne Skarpnord	212 (−4)	1 stroke	(Sweden) Jacqueline Hedwall (a) (Sweden) Frida Parkhagen (a)	300,000		
22 Sep	PGA Gibson Open	International	(Sweden) Caroline Hedwall (a)	213 (−3)	5 strokes	(Norway) Marianne Skarpnord	225,000		
5 Oct	Telia Ladies Finale	Hills	(Slovenia) Zuzana Kamasova	218 (+2)	Playoff	(Sweden) Eva Bjärvall (Sweden) Emma Zackrisson	300,000		

National Championship tournaments

== Order of Merit ==
An official feeder tour for the Ladies European Tour, the top two finishers in the Order of Merit earned LET cards for 2008.

Rank	Player
1	(Norway) Marianne Skarpnord
2	(Switzerland) Florence Lüscher

== See also ==
- 2007 Swedish Golf Tour (men's tour)
