= 1996 Espirito Santo Trophy =

Tournament information
- Dates: 7–10 November
- Location: Santa Rosa, Laguna (Note: Manila is considered as the host city for marketing purposes), Philippines; 14.322°N 121.044°E
- Course: Sta. Elena Golf Club
- Organized by: World Amateur Golf Council
- Format: 54 holes stroke play

Statistics
- Par: 72
- Field: 34 teams 102 players

Champion
- South Korea; Han Hee-won, Kang Soo-yun, Kim Kyung-sook
- 438 (+6)
- Location in the Philippines

The 1996 Espirito Santo Trophy took place 7–10 November at Sta. Elena Golf Club in Santa Rosa, Laguna, Philippines.

It was the 17th women's golf World Amateur Team Championship for the Espirito Santo Trophy.

The tournament was a stroke play team event, due to heavy rain, shortened from 72 holes to 54 holes. There were 34 team entries, each with three players. The best two scores for each round counted towards the team total.

The South Korea team won the Trophy for their first title, beating team Italy by two strokes. Italy earned the silver medal while the defending champions United States took the bronze on third place another four strokes back.

The individual title went to Silvia Cavalleri, Italy, whose score of one-over-par, 217, was one stroke ahead of Janice Moodie, Great Britain & Ireland.

== Teams ==
34 teams entered the event and completed the competition. Each team had three players.

| Country | Players |
|---|---|
| Argentina | Maria Larrauri, Maria Olivero, Antionieta Torres |
| Australia | Tamie Durdin, Kate MacIntosh, Simone Williams |
| Austria | Lilian Mensi-Klarbach, Nina Mensi-Klarbach, Katharina Poppmeier |
| Belgium | Annabelle Haxhe, Catherine Pons, Stephanie Schinkel |
| Bermuda | Judithanne Astwood, Madeline Joell-Warren, Kim Marshall |
| Brazil | Maria Candida Hanneman, Elisabeth Nickhorn, Cristina Menichetti |
| Canada | Mary Ann Lapointe, Barbara Lilley, Tracey Lipp |
| Czech Republic | Martina Dornikova, Petra Kvidova, Gabriela Teissingova |
| Chile | Maria Jose Hurtado, Gloria Soto, Beatriz Steeger |
| Chinese Taipei | Hsiao-chuan Lu, Ya-huei Lu, Yun-jye Wei |
| Colombia | Cristina Baena, Maria Isabel Baena, Luisa Fernanda Cuartas |
| Denmark | Lotta Greve, Karen Margrethe Juul, Christina Kuld |
| Dominican Republic | Dominique Gagnon, Teresa Garcia, Caroline Greven |
| Finland | Riikka Hakkarainen, Anna Hokkanen, Nina Laitinen |
| France | Maitena Alsuguren, Marine Monnet, Amandine Vincent |
| Germany | Elisabeth Esterl, Anika Heuser, Ester Poburski |
| Great Britain & Ireland | Mhairi McKay, Janice Moodie, Elaine Ratcliffe |
| Guatemala | Beatriz Arenas, Naomi Lida, Florencia De Rolz |
| Indonesia | Ani Iman, Retno Mustari, Titi Puryanti |
| Italy | Silvia Cavalleri, Sophie Sandolo, Giulia Sergas |
| Japan | Mia Nakada, Mayumi Nakajima, Kimiyo Yoshida |
| Mexico | Marta Ostos, Vinny Riviello, Nancy Veraslegvi |
| Netherlands | Frederique Lempers, Marcella Neggers, Marieke Zelsman |
| New Zealand | Renee Fowler, Catherine Knight, Gina Scott |
| Peru | Claudia Ferrini, Gilda Hawie, Ninoska Villegas |
| Philippines | Dorothy Delasin, Maricel Manguino, Jennifer Rosales |
| Puerto Rico | Karen Calvesbert, Sacha Medina, Carmen Ana Rivera |
| South Africa | Sanet Marais, Lelitia Moses, Barbara Plant |
| South Korea | Han Hee-won, Kang Soo-yun, Kim Kyung-sook |
| Spain | Sara Beautell, María José Pons, Ana Belen Sánchez |
| Sweden | Anna Berg, Sara Eklund, Mia Löjdahl |
| Switzerland | Sophie Ducrey, Alexandra Gasser, Sandra Storjohann |
| Thailand | Juruwan Gulyanamitta, Rhungthiwa Pangjan, Sasikarn Utajan |
| United States | Kellee Booth, Brenda Corrie-Kuehn, Kelli Kuehne |

== Results ==
The first round of the 72-hole tournament was cancelled due to monsoon rains and lightning and the competition was played over 54 holes. Players were permitted to lift, clean and place their balls on the fairway during all three completed rounds.

| Place | Country | Score | To par |
|---|---|---|---|
| 1 | South Korea | 147-139-152=438 | +6 |
| 2 | Italy | 146-144-150=440 | +8 |
| 3 | United States | 143-149-152=444 | +12 |
| T4 | Spain | 146-151-148=445 | +13 |
| T4 | Great Britain & Ireland | 146-145-154=445 | +13 |
| T6 | Germany | 153-149-149=451 | +19 |
| T6 | Sweden | 149-149-153=451 | +19 |
| T6 | Chinese Taipei | 147-147-157=451 | +19 |
| T9 | Colombia | 144-147-161=452 | +20 |
| T9 | Finland | 150-152-150=452 | +20 |
| 11 | South Africa | 151-147-155=453 | +21 |
| T12 | Australia | 149-154-151=454 | +22 |
| T12 | France | 152-146-156=454 | +22 |
| 14 | New Zealand | 147-150-158=455 | +23 |
| 15 | Canada | 148-151-157=456 | +19 |
| 16 | Netherlands | 152-150-155=457 | +21 |
| 17 | Philippines | 152-151-155=458 | +26 |
| 18 | Japan | 154-154-151=459 | +27 |
| T19 | Austria | 156-151-153=460 | +28 |
| T19 | Denmark | 148-157-155=460 | +28 |
| 21 | Brazil | 150-162-149=461 | +29 |
| 22 | Mexico | 152-154-158=464 | +32 |
| 23 | Switzerland | 156-153-157=466 | +34 |
| 24 | Belgium | 152-157-158=467 | +35 |
| 25 | Indonesia | 161-151-157=469 | +37 |
| 26 | Argentina | 154-154-162=470 | +38 |
| 27 | Thailand | 157-156-163=476 | +44 |
| 28 | Czech Republic | 162-154-161=477 | +45 |
| 29 | Bermuda | 160-161-158=479 | +47 |
| 30 | Puerto Rico | 160-159-163=482 | +50 |
| 31 | Chile | 165-158-163=486 | +54 |
| 32 | Guatemala | 164-169-163=496 | +64 |
| 33 | Peru | 166-171-171=510 | +78 |
| 34 | Dominican Republic | 174-181-173=528 | +96 |

== Individual leaders ==
There was no official recognition for the lowest individual scores.

| Place | Player | Country | Score | To par |
|---|---|---|---|---|
| 1 | Silvia Cavalleri | Italy | 71-73-73=217 | +1 |
| 2 | Janice Moodie | Great Britain & Ireland | 69-75-74=218 | +2 |
| T3 | Nina Laitinen | Finland | 73-72-75=220 | +4 |
| T3 | Kelli Kuehne | United States | 71-75-74=220 | +4 |
| T5 | Anna Berg | Sweden | 72-73-76=221 | +5 |
| T5 | Han Hee-won | South Korea | 79-68-74=221 | +5 |
| T5 | Ana Belen Sánchez | Spain | 73-76-72=221 | +5 |
| 8 | Simone Williams | Australia | 72-77-73=222 | +6 |
| 9 | Hsiao-chuan Lu | Chinese Taipei | 73-73-77=223 | +7 |
| T10 | Sara Beautell | Spain | 73-75-76=224 | +8 |
| T10 | Kellee Booth | United States | 72-74-78=224 | +8 |
| T10 | Kang Soo-yun | South Korea | 72-71-81=224 | +8 |
| T10 | Giulia Sergas | Italy | 75-71-78=224 | +8 |
