= Kaisa Ruuttila =

Finnish golfer

Personal information
- Nationality: Finland
- Born: 14 October 1983 (age 43) Tampere, Finland
- Height: 169 cm (5 ft 7 in)

Career
- Sport: Golf
- Turned professional: 2006
- Former tours: LET (joined 2007); Swedish Golf Tour (joined 2006)
- Professional wins: 9

Achievements and awards
- Swedish Golf Tour Order of Merit: 2010

Kaisa Ruuttila (born 14 October 1983) is a Finnish professional golfer who played on the Ladies European Tour between 2007 and 2013. She won the 2007 South African Ladies Masters and the 2010 Ladies Finnish Open.

== Career ==
Ruuttila played for the National Team and represented Finland at three successive Espirito Santo Trophies. She won the Nordic Championship in 2005 and the Finnish Matchplay Championship in 2006. She finished 9th at the 2005 Ladies Finnish Masters, an LET event.

Ruuttila turned professional in December 2006 after she earned an LET card at Q-School. In her rookie year, she tied for 6th at the Finnair Masters in her native Finland. Her best shot at a win on the LET came at the 2011 Austrian Ladies Open, where she fired seven birdies and one bogey in a second round of 66 to take a one stroke lead into the final round. A disappointing 76 on the final day saw her finish third behind Caroline Hedwall and Caroline Afonso. She later finished tied 4th at the 2011 Lacoste Ladies Open de France, two strokes off the lead, to end the season 54th in the Order of Merit.

In 2010 Ruuttila won 4 of 14 tournaments on the Swedish Golf Tour, including the Ladies Finnish Open, and won the Order of Merit.

In 2012 she sustained a back injury that ended her career in 2013.

== Amateur wins (2) ==
- 2005 Nordic Championship
- 2006 Finnish Matchplay Championship

== Professional wins (9) ==
=== Ladies African Tour wins (1) ===
No.	Date	Tournament	Winning score	Margin of victory	Runner-up	Ref
1	2 Mar 2007	WPGA Masters	–7 (71-69-69=209)	3 strokes	(Denmark) Julie Tvede	

=== Swedish Golf Tour wins (7) ===
No.	Date	Tournament	Winning score	Margin of victory	Runner(s)-up	Ref
1	2 Jun 2006	Booz Allen Nordic Classic (as an amateur)	142 (–2)	1 stroke	(Sweden) Hanna-Sofia Leijon	
2	8 Jul 2006	Gefle Ladies Open (as an amateur)	208 (–8)	Playoff	(Austria) Katharina Werdinig	
3	29 May 2010	Fredrik Jacobson Masters	221 (+5)	1 stroke	(Sweden) Marianne Andersson	
4	13 Jun 2010	Felix Finnish Ladies Open	217 (+4)	Playoff	(Norway) Cecilie Lundgreen (Sweden) Elena Perrone	
5	5 Sep 2010	Landeryd Ladies Masters	212 (–4)	7 strokes	(Sweden) Lotta Wahlin (Sweden) Sara Ardström	
6	10 Sep 2010	Scandic Anglais Trophy	218 (–1)	Playoff	(Sweden) Isabella Ramsay	
7	9 Jul 2011	Körunda Ladies Open	210 (–6)	2 strokes	(Finland) Ursula Wikström	

=== Spanish Women's Tour wins (1) ===
No.	Date	Tournament	Winning score	Margin of victory	Runner-up	Ref
1	6 Nov 2010	Banesto Golf Tour Valencia	138 (–6)	Playoff	(Spain) María Hernández	

== Team appearances ==
Amateur

- Espirito Santo Trophy (representing Finland): 2002, 2004, 2006
- European Ladies' Team Championship (representing Finland): 2003, 2005
