= Mia Löjdahl =

Swedish professional golfer (born 1973)

Personal information
- Nationality: Sweden
- Born: 20 May 1973 (age 53) Karlskrona, Sweden

Career
- Sport: Golf
- College: UCLA; Lund University
- Turned professional: 1997
- Former tours: Ladies European Tour (1997–2002); Swedish Golf Tour
- Professional wins: 5

Best results in LPGA major championships
- Chevron Championship: DNP
- Women's PGA C'ship: DNP
- U.S. Women's Open: DNP
- du Maurier Classic: DNP
- Women's British Open: CUT: 2002

Achievements and awards
- Swedish Golf Tour Order of Merit: (1995) (Note: Ineligible for season award due to amateur status)

Mia Löjdahl (born 20 May 1973) is a retired Swedish professional golfer. She won the 1994 European Lady Junior's Team Championship, topped the Swedish Golf Tour Order of Merit in 1995 as an amateur, and played on the Ladies European Tour six seasons 1997–2002.

== Amateur career ==
Löjdahl was born in Karlskrona and grew up in Ronneby. She showed a talent for golf early and joined the National Team at 15. She attended a golf boarding school in Perstorp alongside Fredrik Andersson Hed and Cecilia Ekelundh, before enrolling at University of California, Los Angeles and playing on the UCLA Bruins women's golf team.

Löjdahl wassuccessfulon the National Team and won silver at the inaugural European Girls' Team Championship in 1991 together with Anna Berg, Charlotta Sörenstam and Maria Hjorth. She won the 1994 European Lady Junior's Team Championship at Gutenhof GC in Austria, with Pia Nilsson coaching a team consisting of Anna Berg, Charlotta Sörenstam, Maria Hjorth, Linda Ericsson and Helena Olsson.

She also represented Sweden at the 1995 European Ladies' Team Championship in Italy where her team finished 7th under captain Pia Nilsson, and at the 1996 Espirito Santo Trophy at St Elena in the Philippines, where she finished 7th together with Anna Berg and Sara Eklund.

Löjdahl played on the Swedish Golf Tour as an amateur 1994–1996. She recorded three victories in 1995, including two national championships, the Swedish International Stroke Play Championship at Aspeboda and the Swedish Matchplay Championship. She topped the Order of Merit, but was ineligible for the cash award due to her amateur status.

== Professional career ==
Löjdahl turned professional and joined the Ladies European Tour (LET) in 1997. On the LET, she kept her card by comfortably finishing in the top 90 on the Order of Merit each year until 2003. Her top finishes include T7 at the 2000 Marrakech Palmeraie Open, T11 at the 2001 Taiwan Ladies Open, and T8 at the P4 Norwegian Masters in 2002.

She also finished T9 at the Malaysia Ladies Open on the 1999 Ladies Asian Golf Tour and was runner-up at the 2000 Ladies Finnish Open. Her only appearance in an LPGA major was at the 2002 Women's British Open at Turnberry.

Löjdahl completed a law degree at Lund University while competing on the LET and was elected to the LET Board of Directors. She retired from professional touring following the 2002 season to become an account executive in the pharmaceutical industry.

== Professional wins (5) ==
=== Swedish Golf Tour wins (5) ===
No.	Date	Tournament	Winning score	To par	Margin of victory	Runner(s)-up	Ref
1	5 Jun 1994	Ängsö Ladies Open (as an amateur)	212	−4	Playoff	(Sweden) Anna Berg	
2	30 Jul 1995	Swedish International Stroke Play Championship (as an amateur)	73-69-74=219	+3	Playoff	(Sweden) Pernilla Sterner	
3	13 Aug 1995	Swedish Matchplay Championship (as an amateur)	4 and 3			(Sweden) Nina Karlsson	
4	20 Aug 1995	Körunda Ladies Open (as an amateur)	73-68-72=213	−3	9 strokes	(Sweden) Katharina Larsson	
5	10 May 1999	Gula Sidorna Grand Opening	72-73=145	+3	3 strokes	(Sweden) Lisa Hed (Sweden) Anna Corderfeldt	

== Results in LPGA majors ==
Note: Löjdahl only played in the Women's British Open.

Tournament	2002
Women's British Open	CUT

CUT = missed the half-way cut

== Team appearances ==
Amateur

- European Girls' Team Championship (representing Sweden): 1991
- European Lady Junior's Team Championship (representing Sweden): 1994 (winners)
- European Ladies' Team Championship (representing Sweden): 1995
- Espirito Santo Trophy (representing Sweden): 1996
