= Lotta Wahlin =

Swedish professional golfer (born 1983)

Personal information
- Nationality: Sweden
- Born: 13 December 1983 (age 42) Linköping, Sweden
- Height: 176 cm (5 ft 9 in)

Career
- Sport: Golf
- Turned professional: 2004
- Former tours: Ladies European Tour (2006–2012); Swedish Golf Tour (2004–2011)
- Professional wins: 8

Number of wins by tour
- Ladies European Tour: 2
- Other: 6

Best results in LPGA major championships
- Women's British Open: T42: 2007

Lotta Wahlin (born 13 December 1983 in Linköping) is a retired Swedish professional golfer. She played on the Ladies European Tour 2006–2012 and won three events in 2008.

== Professional career ==
Wahlin turned professional in June 2004, as she took a step up from the Teen Tour Elite circuit to join the Swedish Golf Tour. Between 2005 and 2010 she won five titles on the tour, including back-to-back victories in the Rejmes Ladies Open, and a triumph in the final of the Swedish Matchplay Championship against Kaisa Ruuttila.

Wahlin joined the LET in 2005 after she earned limited status at Q-School. Her most successful season was in 2008, when she won three events and finished the season 7th on the LET Order of Merit. She cruised to her maiden LET victory with a wire-to-wire win at the inaugural Turkish Ladies Open. Her 12 stroke winning margin was the second largest in LET history, after Laura Davies' 16 shot margin over Åsa Gottmo in the 1995 Ladies Irish Open.

She also won the Wales Ladies Championship of Europe by defeating Martina Eberl at the second hole of a playoff, as well as the Catalonia Ladies Masters in Spain, an unofficial LET event she won with a 6 stroke margin over Rebecca Hudson, Paula Marti and Tania Elósegui.

In late 2009, Wahlin was diagnosed with cancer, which meant she missed most of the 2010 season and was forced to play in the cooler climate of the Swedish Golf Tour (at the time named the Nordea Tour). She returned to the LET in 2011 to record a 66 (–6) at the Dubai Ladies Masters, giving her the first round lead.

Following another setback with a back injury in 2011 she announced her retirement in 2012 at age 28, and the Raiffeisenbank Prague Golf Masters in June 2012 was her last event on the Ladies European Tour.

== Professional wins (8) ==
=== Ladies European Tour (2) ===
No.	Date	Tournament	Winning score	To par	Margin of victory	Runner-up
1	11 May 2008	Turkish Ladies Open	71-71-73-70=285	–3	12 strokes	(South Africa) Stacy Lee Bregman (Sweden) Johanna Johansson (Spain) Paula Marti
2	17 Aug 2008	Wales Ladies Championship of Europe	71-67-71=209	–7	Playoff	(Germany) Martina Eberl

=== Swedish Golf Tour (5) ===
No.	Date	Tournament	Winning score	To par	Margin of victory	Runner(s)-up
1	27 May 2005	Booz Allen Nordic Classic	69-71=140	–4	4 strokes	(Sweden) Anna Berg
2	9 Jul 2005	Rejmes Ladies Open	71-67-74=212	–4	3 strokes	(Sweden) Mikaela Bäckstedt (a) (Sweden) Caroline Larsson (a)
3	19 Aug 2006	Rejmes Ladies Open	70-72-69=211	–5	1 stroke	(Norway) Marianne Skarpnord
4	10 Jul 2010	Körunda Ladies Open	72-72-69=213	–3	3 strokes	(Sweden) Mikaela Parmlid
5	21 Aug 2010	SM Match Play	3 & 1			(Finland) Kaisa Ruuttila

=== Other wins (1) ===
- 2008 Catalonia Ladies Masters (unofficial Ladies European Tour)

== Team appearances ==
Professional

- European Ladies Golf Cup (representing Sweden): 2008
