= Marie Hedberg =

Swedish professional golfer (born 1977)

Personal information
- Full name: Marie Eva Camilla Hedberg
- Nationality: Sweden
- Born: 24 February 1977 (age 49)

Career
- Sport: Golf
- College: San Jose State University
- Turned professional: 1999
- Former tours: Ladies European Tour (joined 2000); Swedish Golf Tour
- Professional wins: 3

Marie Eva Camilla Hedberg (born 24 February 1977) is a retired Swedish professional golfer. She was part of the Swedish teams winning the 1995 European Girls' Team Championship and the 1997 European Ladies' Team Championship and she has played on the Ladies European Tour.

== Amateur career ==
Hedberg was selected for the National Team and won the 1995 European Girls' Team Championship and the 1997 European Ladies' Team Championship. In 1998, her team earned bronze at the European Lady Junior's Team Championship and finished fifth at the Espirito Santo Trophy in Santiago, Chile. She won the 1997 Vagliano Trophy representing the Continent of Europe.

Hedberg attended San Jose State University and won the 1997 Western Athletic Conference Championship.

She played on the Swedish Golf Tour and won the Toyota Ladies Open and the Adapt Ladies Open as an amateur in 1998.

== Professional career ==
Hedberg turned professional in 1999 and played a year on the Swedish Golf Tour where she won the Swedish PGA Champion title, before joining the Ladies European Tour (LET) in 2000. On the LET, she comfortably kept her card by finishing 70th and 61st on the Order of Merit in 2000 and 2001, but finished 98th in 2002.

Hedberg achieved a number of top-10 finishes on the LET, including tied 8th at the South African Women's Masters and tied 9th at the Dutch Ladies Open in 2001.

After retiring from tour, Hedberg became an associate professor at Linnaeus University and chairperson of the board at Växjö Golf Club in Sweden.

== Amateur wins ==
- 1997 Western Athletic Conference Championship

== Professional wins (3) ==
=== Swedish Golf Tour wins (2) ===
No.	Date	Tournament	Winning score	To par	Margin of victory	Runner(s)-up	Ref
1	7 Jun 1998	Toyota Ladies Open (as an amateur)	74-73-70=217	+1	Playoff	(Sweden) Anna Jönsson (Sweden) Sara Melin	
2	13 Sep 1998	Adapt Ladies Open (as an amateur)	67-73-73=213	−3	1 stroke	(Sweden) Nina Karlsson	

=== Other wins (1) ===
- 2001 Swedish Mother-Daughter Championship (with Eva Hedberg)

== Team appearances ==
Amateur

- European Girls' Team Championship (representing Sweden): 1995 (winners)
- European Lady Junior's Team Championship (representing Sweden): 1998
- European Ladies' Team Championship (representing Sweden): 1997 (winners)
- Vagliano Trophy (representing the Continent of Europe): 1997
- Espirito Santo Trophy (representing Sweden): 1998
