= Linda Ericsson =

Swedish professional golfer (born 1973)

Personal information
- Nationality: Sweden
- Born: 2 October 1973 (age 53) Karlstad, Sweden

Career
- Sport: Golf
- Turned professional: 1997
- Former tours: Ladies European Tour (1997–2003); Swedish Golf Tour
- Professional wins: 3

Linda Ericsson (born 2 October 1973) is a retired Swedish professional golfer. She was runner-up at the 1993 European Ladies Amateur, and played on the Ladies European Tour.

== Amateur career ==
Ericsson was selected for the National Team and finished 4th at the 1992 Espirito Santo Trophy in Vancouver, Canada together with Annika Sörenstam and Maria Hjorth. She again finished 4th at the 1993 European Ladies' Team Championship. She won silver in 1992 and gold in 1994 at the European Lady Junior's Team Championship, teamed with Charlotta Sörenstam and four others under captain Pia Nilsson.

Ericsson played on the Swedish Golf Tour as an amateur and won the 1991 SM Match and the 1992 Rörstrand Ladies Open.

She was runner-up to Vibeke Stensrud at the 1993 European Ladies Amateur in Turin, Italy.

== Professional career ==
Ericsson turned professional in 1997 and joined the Ladies European Tour. Her best finish as a rookie was a T15 at the 1997 Ford-Stimorol Danish Open, won by Laura Davies.

She continued to play on the Swedish Golf Tour where she won the 2002 Ladies Finnish Open. She was also runner-up at the 1996 Aspeboda Ladies Open, 1997 Adapt Ladies Open, 1999 LB Data Ladies Open, 2000 Skandia PGA Open, 2001 Felix Finnish Ladies Open.

Ericsson collected a number of top-10 finishes on the LET, including a T10 at the 2001 Ladies French Open and a T8 at the 2003 Open de España Femenino. She retired from tour after the Biarritz Ladies Classic in September 2003.

== Professional wins (3) ==
=== Swedish Golf Tour wins (3) ===
No.	Date	Tournament	Winning score	To par	Margin of victory	Runner(s)-up	Ref
1	20 Jul 1991	SM Match (as an amateur)				(Sweden) Maria Brink	
2	24 May 1992	Rörstrand Ladies Open (as an amateur)	206	−7	5 strokes	(Sweden) Anna-Carin Jonasson	
3	16 Jun 2002	Felix Finnish Ladies Open	212	−4	2 strokes	(Finland) Riikka Hakkarainen	

== Team appearances ==
Amateur

- Espirito Santo Trophy (representing Sweden): 1992
- European Lady Junior's Team Championship (representing Sweden): 1992, 1994 (winners)
- European Ladies' Team Championship (representing Sweden): 1993
