= Sara Eklund =

Swedish professional golfer (born 1974)

Personal information
- Nationality: Sweden
- Born: 31 July 1974 (age 52) Kristianstad, Sweden

Career
- Sport: Golf
- Turned professional: 1997
- Former tours: Ladies European Tour (joined 1997); Swedish Golf Tour
- Professional wins: 3

Best results in LPGA major championships
- Chevron Championship: DNP
- Women's PGA C'ship: DNP
- U.S. Women's Open: DNP
- du Maurier Classic: DNP
- Women's British Open: CUT: 2001, 2002

Sara Eklund (born 31 July 1974) is a retired Swedish professional golfer. She won the 1995 Rörstrand Ladies Open as an amateur and played on the Ladies European Tour six seasons, 1997–2002.

== Amateur career ==
Eklund played on the Swedish Golf Tour as an amateur 1993–1996 and won the Rörstrand Ladies Open in 1995. She was selected for the National Team and represented Sweden at the 1995 European Ladies' Team Championship in Italy where her team finished 7th under captain Pia Nilsson, and at the 1996 Espirito Santo Trophy at St Elena in the Philippines where she finished 7th together with Anna Berg and Mia Löjdahl.

== Professional career ==
Eklund turned professional and joined the Ladies European Tour (LET) in 1997. On the LET, she kept her card by comfortably finishing in the top 90 on the Order of Merit each year between 1999 and 2003, peaking at 38th in 2000. Her best LET finish is T11, which she reached at the Ladies French Open and Ladies Hannover Expo 2000 Open in 1999 and at the Compaq Open in 2000. She repeated the T11 at the Compaq Open again in 2001, this time along Maria Hjorth, Laura Davies and Juli Inkster.

Eklund shared the lead at the 2000 Chrysler Open together with Corinne Dibnah, eventually finishing T30. She also led the 2000 Dutch Ladies Open after an opening round of 66, went head to head with Laura Davies in the second round, but had to settle for T29 after a final round of 82. She finished T7 at the Malaysia JAL Ladies Open on the 1998 Ladies Asian Golf Tour, and was runner-up at the 2000 Ladies Finnish Open.

Her two appearances in LPGA majors were at the 2001 Women's British Open at Sunningdale Golf Club and 2002 Women's British Open at Turnberry.

== Professional wins (3) ==
=== Swedish Golf Tour wins (3) ===
| No. | Date | Tournament | Winning score | To par | Margin of victory | Runner-up | Ref |
|---|---|---|---|---|---|---|---|
| 1 | 21 May 1995 | Rörstrand Ladies Open (as an amateur) | 77-78-67=222 | +9 | 1 stroke | (Sweden) Åsa Gottmo (Finland) Riikka Hakkarainen | |
| 2 | 12 Sep 1999 | LB Data Ladies Open | 72-72-68=212 | −4 | 1 stroke | (Sweden) Linda Ericsson (Sweden) Susanna Gustafsson | |
| 3 | 9 Sep 2001 | Telia Ladies Finale | 70-70-70=210 | −6 | 10 strokes | (Sweden) Pernilla Sterner | |

== Results in LPGA majors ==
| Tournament | 2001 | 2002 |
|---|---|---|
| Women's British Open | CUT | CUT |

Note: Eklund only played in the Women's British Open.
CUT = missed the half-way cut

== Team appearances ==
Amateur

- European Ladies' Team Championship (representing Sweden): 1995
- Espirito Santo Trophy (representing Sweden): 1996
