= Albatross Golf Club =

Golf club in Sweden

Coordinates: 57.7781°N 11.9552°E

- Location in Sweden

Club information
- Location: Gothenburg, Västra Götaland County, Sweden
- Established: 1973 (SGF Member)
- Type: Private
- Total holes: 36
- Tournaments: Volvo International Tournament; Volvo Albatross
- Website: albatrossgolfklubb.se

18-hålsbanan
- Designed by: Lars Andréasson
- Par: 71
- Length: 5,642 m

19-27
- Designed by: Tommy Nordström
- Par: 37

Albatross Golf Club is a golf club located 9 km north of central Gothenburg, Sweden. It has hosted the Volvo International Tournament on the Ladies European Tour.

== History ==
The club was admitted to the Swedish Golf Federation in 1974 and the first 18 hole course was inaugurated in 1975.

With global vehicle manufacturer Volvo headquartered in Gothenburg, it was only natural for the up-and-coming club to host the Volvo International Tournament, the first Ladies European Tour event held outside the UK and France, starting in 1980. The club also hosted the Volvo Albatross, Tour Final of the Swedish Golf Tour 1986–1989, with winners such as Magnus Persson, Anders Sørensen and Magnus Sunesson.

Amongst the successful players to represent the club are Ladies European Tour players Helene Koch and Kärstin Ehrnlund and Mats Lanner, European Tour winner and member of the winning Swedish team at the 1991 Dunhill Cup.

== Tournaments hosted ==
=== Ladies European Tour ===
Year	Championship	Winner
1980	Volvo International Tournament	(England) Jenny Lee Smith
1981	Volvo International Tournament	(England) Beverly Lewis

=== Swedish Golf Tour ===
- Volvo Albatross – 1986–1989

=== Swedish Golf Tour (women) ===
- Bridgestone Ladies Open – 1999
- Mercedes-Benz Ladies Open – 2000
- Albatross Ladies Open – 2001

=== Swedish Pro circuit ===
Year	Championship	Winner
1982	Marbella Invest Classic	(Sweden) Per-Arne Brostedt

== See also ==
- List of golf courses in Sweden
