= Cecilie Lundgreen =

Norwegian professional golfer (born 1973)

Personal information
- Nickname: CC
- Nationality: Norway
- Born: 6 February 1973 (age 53) Sarpsborg, Norway

Career
- Sport: Golf
- College: Florida Atlantic University
- Turned professional: 1998
- Former tours: Ladies European Tour (joined 1999); LET Access Series (joined 2012); Sunshine Ladies Tour (joined 2014); Swedish Golf Tour (joined 1998)

Best results in LPGA major championships
- Chevron Championship: DNP
- Women's PGA C'ship: DNP
- U.S. Women's Open: DNP
- Women's British Open: CUT: 2001, 2002
- Evian Championship: DNP

Achievements and awards
- Swedish Golf Tour Order of Merit: 2012
- Atlantic Sun Conference Golfer of the Year: 1994
- FAU Female Student-Athlete of the Year: 1997
- FAU Sports Hall of Fame: 2007

Cecilie Lundgreen (born 6 February 1973) is a Norwegian professional golfer. She played on the Ladies European Tour between 1999 and 2013, where her best finish was runner-up at the South African Women's Masters in 2001.

== Amateur career ==
Lundgreen won the 1991 Norwegian Junior Championship and the 1994 Norwegian National Golf Championship. She represented Norway at the 1994 Espirito Santo Trophy, together with Line Berg and Vibeke Stensrud.

Lundgreen attended Florida Atlantic University on a golf scholarship 1994–1997. She made an immediate impact, capturing Atlantic Sun Conference Golfer of the Year honors in 1994 after winning the conference tournament as a freshman. She was all-conference selection four times and was named FAU Female Student-Athlete of the Year in 1997, and inducted into the FAU Sports Hall of Fame in 2007.

== Professional career ==
Lundgreen turned professional in 1998 and played a year on the Swedish Golf Tour where her best finish was solo third at the 1998 Felix Finnish Ladies Open, before joining the Ladies European Tour in 1999. Her standout LET season was 2001, where she finished T6 at the Ladies French Open and runner-up at the South African Women's Masters, one stroke behind Samantha Head, and finished ranked 27th in the Order of Merit.

In 2006 Lundgreen played on the Nedbank Women's Golf Tour in South Africa, where she was runner-up at the Pam Golding Ladies International and the South African Women's Open.

Struggling to keep her card, Lundgreen played intermittently on the Swedish Golf Tour, where she was runner-up at the 2009 Felix Finnish Ladies Open, the 2010 Swedish PGA Championship, and the VW Söderbergs Ladies Masters and Norrporten Ladies Open in 2011. In 2012 Lundgreen played in the LET Access Series, winning the Kristianstad Åhus Ladies Open and Women's Bank Open, finishing third in the Order of Merit and re-capturing her LET card for 2013. She also won the 2012 Swedish Golf Tour Order of Merit in the process.

In 2014 she was again runner-up at the Norrporten Ladies Open. Playing on the Sunshine Ladies Tour in South Africa, she was runner-up in several events including the 2014 Ladies Tshwane Open and the 2017 Sun International Ladies Challenge.

== Private life ==
Lundgreen retired from tour in 2017 and became General Manager and Head Pro of Borregaard Golf Club. She is co-author of a book titled "Why I am a Mormon", published in 2012 by Deseret Book Company, describing her conversion into the Church of Jesus Christ of Latter-day Saints.

== Amateur wins (5) ==
- 1991 Norwegian Junior Championship
- 1994 Norwegian National Golf Championship

== Professional wins (2) ==
=== LET Access Series wins (2) ===
No.	Date	Tournament	Winning score	To par	Margin of victory	Runner-up
1	12 May 2012	Kristianstad Åhus Ladies Open^{1}	74-71-77=222	+6	1 stroke	(France) Marion Ricordeau
2	11 Aug 2012	Women's Bank Open	68-69-69=206	−7	3 strokes	(Germany) Nina Holleder (a)

^{1}Co-sanctioned by the Swedish Golf Tour

== Results in LPGA majors ==
Tournament	2001	2002
Kraft Nabisco Championship		
U.S. Women's Open		
Women's PGA Championship		
Women's British Open	CUT	CUT

Did not play

CUT = missed the half-way cut.
NT = no tournament

== Team appearances ==
Amateur

- European Ladies' Team Championship (representing Norway): 1993, 1995
- Espirito Santo Trophy (representing Norway): 1994

Professional

- European Nations Cup (representing Norway): 2008, 2010
