= Anna Berg =

Swedish professional golfer (born 1973)

Personal information
- Nationality: Sweden
- Born: 25 April 1973 (age 53)

Career
- Sport: Golf
- Turned professional: 1997
- Former tours: Ladies European Tour; Swedish Golf Tour
- Professional wins: 7

Achievements and awards
- Ladies European Tour Rookie of the Year: 1997

Anna Berg (born 25 April 1973) is a Swedish professional golfer who played on the Ladies European Tour. She was 1997 LET Rookie of the Year and runner-up at the Taiwan Ladies Open in 2001.

== Amateur career ==
Berg was on the National Team and won silver at the inaugural European Girls' Team Championship in 1991 together with Maria Hjorth, Mia Löjdahl and Charlotta Sörenstam. In 1994, she won the European Lady Junior's Team Championship with the same teammates plus Linda Ericsson and Helena Olsson. She was a member of the Swedish team at the 1995 European Ladies' Team Championship in Italy, and she teamed up with Sara Eklund and Mia Löjdahl for the 1996 Espirito Santo Trophy, held in the Philippines.

Individually, she finished third at the 1996 European Ladies Amateur Championship, two strokes behind Silvia Cavalleri, and won the 1996 French International Ladies Amateur Championship.

Berg won three tournaments on the Swedish Golf Tour (SGT), feeder tour for the Ladies European Tour, while still an amateur, including the 1996 SM Match Play.

== Professional career ==
Berg turned professional in 1997 and joined the Ladies European Tour, where she finished 30th on the Order of Merit to claim the LET Rookie of the Year Award. Her best finish her rookie season was tied 4th at the Ladies Swiss Open.

On the 2001 Ladies European Tour, she was runner-up at the Taiwan Ladies Open in Portugal, one stroke behind Raquel Carriedo, and finished 21st on the Order of Merit.

In 2005 and 2006, she won four SGT tournaments, including successfully navigating playoffs against Anna Nordqvist and Caroline Hedwall.

== Amateur wins ==
- 1996 French International Ladies Amateur Championship

== Professional wins (7) ==
=== Swedish Golf Tour (7) ===
No.	Date	Tournament	Winning score	To par	Margin of victory	Runner(s)-up	Ref
1	3 Aug 1991	SI Ansvar Ladies Open (as an amateur)	290	+2	7 strokes	(Sweden) Marie Wennersten-From	
2	17 Sep 1995	Sölvesborg Ladies Open (as an amateur)	73-72-72=217	+1	Playoff	(Sweden) Malin Burström (Sweden) Åsa Gottmo	
3	8 Sep 1996	SM Match Play (as an amateur)	6 and 5			(Sweden) Nina Karlsson	
4	10 May 2005	Telia Grand Opening	74-73=147	+3	Playoff	(Sweden) Anna Nordqvist	
5	30 Sep 2005	Telia Ladies Finale	71-73-71=215	−1	2 strokes	(Sweden) Anna Tybring	
6	24 May 2006	Telia Grand Opening	74-77=151	+7	2 strokes	(Sweden) Hanna-Sofia Leijon	
7	6 Oct 2006	Telia Ladies Finale	70-70-72=212	+6	Playoff	(Sweden) Caroline Hedwall	

== Team appearances ==
Amateur

- European Girls' Team Championship (representing Sweden): 1991
- European Lady Junior's Team Championship (representing Sweden): 1994 (winners)
- European Ladies' Team Championship (representing Sweden): 1995
- Espirito Santo Trophy (representing Sweden): 1996
