= Pernilla Sterner =

Swedish golfer (born 1968)

Personal information
- Full name: Pernilla Sterner
- Nationality: Sweden
- Born: 2 December 1968 (age 57) Linköping, Sweden
- Height: 5 ft 4 in (1.63 m)

Career
- Sport: Golf
- College: San Jose State
- Turned professional: 1994
- Former tours: LET (1994–2002); LPGA (1999)
- Professional wins: 6

Number of wins by tour
- Ladies Asian Golf Tour: 2
- Other: 4

Pernilla Sterner (born 2 December 1968) is a retired Swedish professional golfer who played primarily on the Ladies European Tour.

== Career ==
Sterner made her debut on the Ladies European Tour as an amateur at the 1988 Danish Ladies Open where she made the cut. After graduating from San Jose State University, she turned professional in 1994 and joined the Ladies European Tour. A win proved elusive and her best result came as runner-up at the 1996 Marks & Spencer European Open at Hanbury Manor. She was tied for ninth at the 1997 Evian Masters and other top ten finishes include the 1994 VAR Open de France Dames (T7), 1996 Ford-Stimorol Danish Open (T10), 1999 Air France Madame Biarritz Open (T4) and the 2002 Ladies Irish Open (T8).

Sterner earned non-exempt status for the 1999 LPGA Tour, after losing a playoff for the last exempt spot to Åsa Gottmo in a four-way playoff and played seven LPGA Tour events. Her career highlight came perhaps on the Ladies Asian Golf Tour where she won the Toyota Philippine Ladies Open and the Indonesia JAL Ladies Open in February 1997. She retired from tour in 2004 to become a golf coach.

== Professional wins (6) ==
=== Ladies Asian Golf Tour wins (2) ===
No.	Date	Tournament	Winning score	To par	Margin of victory	Runner-up
1	8 Feb 1997	Toyota Philippine Ladies Open	75-68-73=216	E	1 stroke	(Sweden) Åsa Gottmo
2	28 Feb 1997	Indonesia JAL Ladies Open	72-67-76=215	−1	1 stroke	

=== Telia Tour wins (4) ===
- 1998 Ladies PGA Championship, Körunda Ladies Open
- 2001 Felix Finnish Ladies Open, Telia Ladies Grand Open

== Team appearances ==
Amateur

- European Ladies' Team Championship (representing Sweden): 1989, 1993
