= Nina Karlsson =

Swedish professional golfer

Personal information
- Nationality: Sweden
- Born: 16 November 1975 (age 50) Växjö, Sweden

Career
- Sport: Golf
- Turned professional: 1995
- Former tours: Ladies European Tour (joined 1998); Swedish Golf Tour
- Professional wins: 7

Best results in LPGA major championships
- Chevron Championship: DNP
- Women's PGA C'ship: DNP
- U.S. Women's Open: DNP
- du Maurier Classic: DNP
- Women's British Open: CUT: 2002, 2004

Achievements and awards
- Swedish Golf Tour Order of Merit: 1997, 1998

Nina Karlsson (born 16 November 1975) is a retired Swedish professional golfer. She won the Swedish Golf Tour (SGT) Order of Merit in 1997 and 1998, and played on the Ladies European Tour (LET) ten seasons 1998–2007.

== Amateur career ==
Karlsson won the 1993 Norwegian Ladies Open Amateur Championship and represented Sweden at the 1994 European Girls' Team Championship at Club de Campo in Malaga, Spain, where her team finished fifth.

== Professional career ==
Karlsson turned professional in 1995 and joined the Swedish Golf Tour (SGT) where she recorded five career wins, including winning the Körunda Ladies Open twice. She reached the final in SM Match three years running 1995–1997 but lost to Mia Löjdahl, Anna Berg and Catrin Nilsmark, respectively. After winning the SGT Order of Merit in 1997 and 1998, she joined the Ladies European Tour in 1998.

On the LET, Karlsson finished top-50 on the Order of Merit in 1999, 2000, 2002 and 2003. Her top finishes include T6 at the 1999 Donegal Irish Ladies' Open, two strokes behind Sandrine Mendiburu, T7 at the 2000 Ladies Hannover Expo 2000 Open, and T5 at the Ladies Open de Costa Azul and T10 at the P4 Norwegian Masters in 2002. She made the cut at the 2000 Women's British Open but missed the cut in 2002 and 2004.

Karlsson retired after the 2007 season due to a back injury.

=== LET scoring record ===
Karlsson carded a 29 for nine holes in the final round of the 2005 Ladies Central European Open at Old Lake GC in Hungary (par 71), tying the LET 9-hole record for lowest round set by Kitrina Douglas at the 1988 Ladies Italian Open and later matched by Laura Davies, Trish Johnson and Sophie Gustafson.

== Amateur wins ==
- 1993 Norwegian Ladies Open Amateur Championship

== Professional wins (7) ==
=== Swedish Golf Tour wins (5) ===
| No. | Date | Tournament | Winning score | To par | Margin of victory | Runner-up | Ref |
|---|---|---|---|---|---|---|---|
| 1 | 7 Jun 1997 | Toyota Ladies Open | 73-71-71=215 | −1 | 1 stroke | (Sweden) Catrin Nilsmark | |
| 2 | 29 Jun 1997 | Körunda Ladies Open | 71-75-71=217 | +1 | 2 strokes | (Sweden) Maria Bodén | |
| 3 | 30 Aug 1998 | LB Data Ladies Open | 71-71-69=211 | −5 | 4 strokes | (Sweden) Malin Burström | |
| 4 | 20 Jun 1999 | Trummenäs Ladies Open | 72-72-70=214 | −2 | 1 stroke | (Sweden) Lisa Hed | |
| 5 | 7 Jul 2002 | Körunda Ladies Open | 74-71-65=210 | −6 | Playoff | (Finland) Riikka Hakkarainen | |

=== Other wins (2) ===
- 1997 Swedish Mother-Daughter Championship (with Margareth Karlsson)
- 1998 Swedish Mother-Daughter Championship (with Margareth Karlsson)

== Results in LPGA majors ==
| Tournament | 2002 | 2003 | 2004 |
|---|---|---|---|
| Women's British Open | CUT | | CUT |

Note: Karlsson only played in the Women's British Open.

Did not play

CUT = missed the half-way cut

== Team appearances ==
Amateur

- European Girls' Team Championship (representing Sweden): 1993

== See also ==
- Ladies European Tour records
