= Riikka Hakkarainen =

Finnish professional golfer (born 1977)

Personal information
- Nationality: Finland
- Born: 23 May 1977 (age 49) Espoo, Finland

Career
- Sport: Golf
- Turned professional: 1997
- Former tours: Ladies European Tour (1998–2011); Swedish Golf Tour (1997–2004)
- Professional wins: 4

Number of wins by tour
- Ladies European Tour: 1
- Other: 3

Achievements and awards
- Swedish Golf Tour Order of Merit: 2002

Riikka Hakkarainen (born 23 May 1977) is a Finnish professional golfer who played on the Ladies European Tour between 1998 and 2011. She won the 2006 Tenerife Ladies Open.

== Amateur career ==
Hakkarainen was born in Espoo, Finland, and played for the Finnish National Ladies Team from the age of 15. She won the Nordic Girls Championship twice, in 1995 and 1996, and the Scottish Girls Strokeplay Championship and the Greece Women's Amateur in 1996. She also finished 3rd in the British Girls Amateur Championship in 1995, and represented Finland in the 1994 and 1996 Espirito Santo Trophy, the World Amateur Golf Team Championships.

In 1995, a few days before her 18th birthday, Hakkarainen was runner-up in the Rörstrand Ladies Open on the Swedish Golf Tour, one stroke behind winner Sara Eklund.

== Professional career ==
Hakkarainen turned professional in 1997, at only 19 years old, and joined the Swedish Golf Tour. In her rookie season her best result was as runner-up at the Swedish PGA Championship, one of six top-10 finishes.

In 1998, she also joined the Ladies European Tour, where she made the cut at the Weetabix Women's British Open, and had a best finish of 15th at the Donegal Irish Ladies Open. She lost a playoff at the Hook Ladies Open in Sweden.

Hakkarainen was runner-up at the 1999 Ladies Italian Open, one stroke behind England's Samantha Head. The next year she had a season best finish of 14th at The Daily Telegraph Ladies British Masters, and she lost a playoff at the Gefle Ladies Open in Sweden.

In 2002, she claimed her maiden professional victory at the Telkom Women's Classic on the Nedbank Women's Golf Tour in South Africa. She finished 3rd at the Biarritz Ladies Classic, one stroke away from joining the playoff, and won the Swedish Golf Tour Order of Merit after she was runner-up at the Felix Finnish Ladies Open and at the Körunda Ladies Open, and won the Swedish Matchplay Championship.

Hakkarainen won her second title in Sweden, the Österåker Ladies Masters, in 2004, and in 2005 she was again runner-up at the Felix Finnish Ladies Open. She teamed up with Minea Blomqvist to represent Finland at the inaugural Women's World Cup of Golf in 2005, and again in 2006.

In 2006, she won her only LET title, the Tenerife Ladies Open. She also finished 3rd at the Ladies Central European Open, and 6th at the Finnair Masters, to end the season a career best 9th on the LET Order of Merit.

Hakkarainen started experiencing balance problems during her best season, and in the middle of 2007 she was forced to take a 2 year hiatus from competitive tournament golf. She made a comeback to the LET in 2009, and her best finish port-return was a tie for 5th at the 2010 Open De España Femenino. Hakkarainen retired from tour following the 2011 season.

== Personal life ==
Hakkarainen is considered a "Pioneer of Finnish golf" after a long and successful career. She moved to London, UK, in 2010 and still plays a few tournaments a year. She owns and runs Golf Performance, a personal training and coaching business in Mayfair, London; and Helsinki, Finland.

== Professional wins (4) ==
=== Ladies European Tour (1) ===
No.	Date	Tournament	Winning score	To par	Margin of victory	Runner-up	Ref
1	30 Apr 2006	Tenerife Ladies Open	73-70-74-71=288	E	2 strokes	(Spain) Tania Elósegui	

=== Swedish Golf Tour wins (2) ===
No.	Date	Tournament	Winning score	To par	Margin of victory	Runner-up	Ref
1	29 Jun 2002	Swedish Matchplay Championship				(Sweden) Karolina Andersson	
2	1 Aug 2004	Österåker Ladies Masters	73-70-72=215	−1	4 strokes	(Sweden) Helena Alterby	

=== Nedbank South Africa Women's Golf Tour (1) ===
- 2002 Telkom Ladies Classic

== Team appearances ==
Amateur

- European Girls' Team Championship (representing Finland): 1993
- Espirito Santo Trophy (representing Finland): 1994, 1996

Professional

- World Cup (representing Finland): 2005, 2006
