= Bokskogen Golf Club =

Golf club in Sweden

- Location in Sweden
- 55.5623°N 13.1115°E

Club information
- Location: Svedala, Skåne County, Sweden
- Established: 1965 (SGF Member)
- Type: Private
- Total holes: 36
- Tournaments: Scandinavian Enterprise Open; PLM Open
- Website: bokskogen.com

Old Course
- Designed by: Anders Amilon (1967); Jan Sederholm; Tommy Nordström
- Par: 71
- Length: 6,378 m

King's Course
- Designed by: Douglas Brasier; Bengt Lorichs
- Par: 71
- Length: 5,470 m

Bokskogen Golf Club (Bokskogens Golfklubb; Bokskogens GK) is a 36-hole golf club located 15 km southeast of Malmö in Skåne County, southern Sweden. It has hosted two tournaments on the European Tour.

== History ==
The club has two 18-hole courses, the original parkland Old Course laid out on the shores of Lake Yddingen designed by Anders Amilon, and the King's Course, a heathland course finished in 1990 and designed by Douglas Brasier and Bengt Lorichs.

In 2020 Svensk Golf, official publication of the Swedish Golf Federation, ranked the Old Course #37 in Sweden using the Golf Digest methodology.

Successful players that have represented the club include European Tour player Martin Erlandsson and Ryder Cup winner Peter Hanson.

The club has hosted the Scandinavian Enterprise Open and PLM Open on the European Tour as well as the Skandia PGA Open on the Challenge Tour. In 2003 Bokskogen hosted the Junior Solheim Cup, where the European team including Pernilla Lindberg, Azahara Muñoz and Marianne Skarpnord captained by Helen Alfredsson beat the American team including Paula Creamer and Brittany Lincicome 12½–11½. In 2006 the European Boys' Team Championship was hosted and in 2016 the Annika Invitational Europe.

== Tournaments hosted ==
Year	Championship	Winner
1974	Scandinavian Enterprise Open	(England) Tony Jacklin
1975	Scandinavian Enterprise Open	(United States) George Burns
1989	PLM Open	(Australia) Mike Harwood
1990	PLM Open	(Northern Ireland) Ronan Rafferty

=== Amateur ===
- Junior Solheim Cup – 2003
- European Boys' Team Championship – 2006
- Annika Invitational Europe – 2016
