= Johanna Johansson =

Swedish golfer (born 1977)

Personal information
- Full name: Johanna Monica Elisabeth Johansson
- Nationality: Sweden
- Born: 24 November 1977 (age 48) Linköping, Sweden
- Height: 1.70 m (5 ft 7 in)

Career
- Sport: Golf
- Turned professional: 2000
- Current tour: Ladies European Tour (joined 2002)
- Professional wins: 1

Number of wins by tour
- Ladies European Tour: 1

Best results in LPGA major championships
- Chevron Championship: DNP
- Women's PGA C'ship: DNP
- U.S. Women's Open: DNP
- Women's British Open: CUT: 2004, 2007, 2008, 2009

Johanna Monica Elisabeth Westerberg Johansson (born 24 November 1977) is a Swedish professional golfer.

Westerberg was born in Linköping, Sweden. She resides in Södertälje, Sweden.

Westerberg turned professional in 2000 and has been a member of the Ladies European Tour since 2002. She played under her maiden name, Johanna Westerberg, until she got married in 2004. She competed as Johanna Waldh until her divorce in 2006. She is now married to tennis professional Joachim Johansson and they have one child.

She won her first tournament, Ladies Open of Portugal, in 2009.

== Professional wins (1) ==
=== Ladies European Tour (1) ===
- 2009 Ladies Open of Portugal
