= Swedish Golf Tour (women) =

Women's professional golf tour

Nordic Golf Tour
- Current season, competition or edition: 2026 Swedish Golf Tour (women)
- Sport: Golf
- Founded: 1986
- Founder: Swedish Golf Federation and PGA of Sweden
- First season: 1986
- Countries: Denmark (2002–2024); Finland (1998–2011); Norway (2012–2020); Sweden
- Website: https://tournytt.se/tour/damtouren

The Swedish Golf Tour for women, since 2022 known as the Ahlsell Nordic Golf Tour for sponsorship reasons, is a professional golf tour for women held in Sweden and neighboring countries since 1986.

Before the establishment of the Ladies European Tour (LET) development tour, LET Access Series (LETAS) in 2010, the tour was the first official feeder tour for the LET. Starting in 2012 selected tournaments have been incorporated in the LETAS schedule, and since 2021, all scheduled tournaments.

The organization that runs the tour operate a corresponding men's Swedish Golf Tour, founded in 1984. The operating company, Svenska Golftourerna AB, was founded in 1988 jointly by the PGA of Sweden and the Swedish Golf Federation (SGF), to organize the two Swedish Golf Tours for men and women. Its first chairperson was Ola Öqvist. In 2018, the SGF became the sole owner and operator.

== History ==
At the beginning of 1979, Kärstin Ehrnlund became the first Swedish female tournament professional. The following year, Ehrnlund became the first Swedish winner on an international professional golf tour, when she won on the Ladies European Tour (LET) (at the time named the WPGA Tour) and by this showed the possibility for talented Swedish female golfers to turn playing professionals.

The first professional tournament for women held in Sweden and also the first LET tournament in Sweden, was an invitational tournament named the Volvo International taking place at Albatross Golf Club in Gothenburg in 1980 and again in 1981.

At the annual meeting of the Swedish Golf Federation in March 1983, "open golf" was introduced, which meant that, from next year both amateurs and professionals were allowed to enter all domestic competitions, international amateur tournaments excluded. Non-PGA members with a licence, as well as PGA members, were allowed to receive prize money. The new and internationally unique rules, made it possible to transform the traditionally most important amateur tournaments in the country to professional tournaments, attractive to sponsors and players.

The next Ladies European Tour tournament held in Sweden, took place at Mölle Golf Club in Mölle in 1984 and was named the Höganäs Ladies Open.

The women's Swedish Golf Tour, designed to help Swedish golfers to reach the standard of play needed to qualify for the LET, was established in 1986, two years after the men's tour in the country. The women's tour consisted the first year of seven tournaments, two of them co-sanctioned with the Ladies' European Tour. Liselotte Neumann was the first Order-of-Merit winner, thanks to second-place finishes in both of the two co-sanctioned events.

=== Official Feeder Tour to LET ===
In 2005, the tour became the first official feeder tour for the LET, with the two leading non-exempt players from the ranking gaining LET cards for the following season, and the remainder of the top ten exempted into the final stage of the LET Qualifying School.

=== Women's European Satellite Tour ===
The Swedish and Spanish (known as the Banesto Tour at the time) tours did not initially feature their events on the LET Access Series which launched in 2010. Instead they launched their own regional development tour in 2011, which featured four events from each country, named the Women's European Satellite Tour (WEST). In 2012, the tour was folded into LETAS.

=== Nordic Golf Tour ===
For 2020, in cooperation between the Golf Federations of Sweden, Denmark and Norway, the Ladies' Nordic Golf Tour (NGT) was introduced, with its Order-of merit ranking named Road to Creekhouse Ladies Open, including eight tournaments in three countries, six of them to be co-sanctioned by LETAS. This meant that the women's SGT remained, but on the level below the NGT.

However, due to the COVID-19 pandemic the events outside Sweden were cancelled and the remaining Swedish events were removed from the 2020 LET Access Series (LETAS) schedule. Two of the five scheduled tournaments to be held in Sweden went ahead, but with a reduced purse.

From 2021, the Swedish Golf Tour was included in and synonymous with the Nordic Golf Tour, and the Nordic cooperation was abandoned except for an event in Denmark which remained on the schedule until 2024.

== Sponsorship ==
The tour was named the Swedish Golf Tour 1986–1990, the Lancôme Tour 1991–1994, the Telia Infomedia Golf Tour 1995–1997, the Telia Tour 1998–2008, the SAS Masters Tour 2008–2009, the Nordea Tour 2010–2016 and the Swedish Golf Tour 2017–2020. In 2021, the tour was renamed the Nordic Golf Tour, and known as the Ahlsell Nordic Golf Tour from 2022 for sponsorship reasons.

Tour name	Years	Sponsor
Swedish Golf Tour	1986–1990	
Lancôme Tour	1991–1994	Lancôme
Telia Infomedia Golf Tour	1995–1997	Telia Company
Telia Tour	1998–2008	Telia Company
SAS Masters Tour	2008–2009	Scandinavian Airlines
Nordea Tour	2010–2016	Nordea
Swedish Golf Tour	2017–2020	
Nordic Golf Tour	2021	
Ahlsell Nordic Golf Tour	2022–2025	Ahlsell Group
Swedish Golf Tour	2026–	

== Order of Merit winners ==
Year	Winner	Country	Money (SEK)	Points
2026	Tilde Löfman	Sweden	23,750	23,750
2025	Ragga Kristinsdóttir	Iceland	€12,697	12,697
2024	Kajsa Arwefjäll	Sweden	€15,652	15,652
2023	Gemma Clews	England	€11,702	117,020
2022	Patricia Isabel Schmidt	Germany	€8,501	9,216
2021	Lily May Humphreys	England	€14,980	14,400
2020	Line Toft Hansen; Louise Rydqvist (a)	Denmark; Sweden	22,400 (Note: The Order of Merit win was shared between Hansen and Rydqvist. Due to the Covid19 situation during 2020, a reduced schedule was played and Hansen only took part in two tournaments and Rydqvist only took part in one tournament. As Rydqvist was an amateur, she received no prize money.)	22,400
2019	Tonje Daffinrud	Norway	215,876	160,985
2018	Filippa Möörk	Sweden	166.185	142,899
2017	Sarah Nilsson	Sweden	110,649	106,002
2016	Jenny Haglund	Sweden	278,104 (Note: In the 2016 SGT season, Haglund officially won SEK 84,000 and EUR 20,432, which approximately, counting with an exchange rate of 9.5, makes SEK 194,104 and total prize money won SEK 278,104.)	202,334
2015	Johanna Gustavsson	Sweden	114,248	103,420
2014	Natalie Wille	Sweden	161.519	161,608
2013	Lina Boqvist	Sweden	91,149	84,428
2012	Cecilie Lundgreen	Norway	121,670	97,231
2011	Maria Ohlsson	Sweden	177,601	128,576
2010	Kaisa Ruuttila	Finland	300,650	218,083
2009	Karin Börjeskog	Sweden	175,509	136,758
2008	Zuzana Mašínová	Czech Republic	305,159	247,073
2007	Marianne Skarpnord	Norway	270,550	2,912
2006	Christine Hallström	Sweden	162,659	1,756
2005	Nina Reis	Sweden	288,415	2,968
2004	Emelie Svenningsson (Leijon)	Sweden	125,456	1,548
2003	Linda Wessberg	Sweden	123,145	1,584
2002	Riikka Hakkarainen	Finland	96,609	1,402
2001	Maria Bodén	Sweden	117,706	1,475
2000	Susanne Westling	Sweden	119,093	1,514
1999	Lisa Hed	Sweden	156,878	1,715
1998	Nina Karlsson	Sweden	76,725	1,068
1997	Nina Karlsson	Sweden	79,912	1,545
1996	Maria Hjorth (McBride)	Sweden	67,625	
1995	Åsa Gottmo	Sweden	29,750	
1994	Åsa Gottmo	Sweden	71,900	
1993	Carin Hjalmarsson (Koch)	Sweden	94,750	
1992	Carin Hjalmarsson (Koch)	Sweden	81,825	
1991	Marie Wennersten	Sweden	127,700	
1990	Marie Wennersten	Sweden	71,750	
1989	Pia Nilsson	Sweden	90,500	
1988	Sofia Grönberg (Whitmore)	Sweden	34,000	
1987	Maria Guslin (Lindbladh)	Sweden	37,500	
1986	Liselotte Neumann	Sweden	90,300	

Note: Until 1996, the SGT Order of Merit standings was decided by money won and since 1997 different point systems, not comparable between years, have been in force.

== See also ==
- List of sporting events in Sweden
- Swedish Golf Tour (men)
- Swedish PGA Championship (women)
