= 2015 Swedish Golf Tour (women) =

30th season of the Swedish Golf Tour (women)

2015 Swedish Golf Tour season
- Duration: May 2015 – October 2015
- Number of official events: 9
- Most wins: 2 wins (tie): (Germany) Olivia Cowan (Germany) Isi Gabsa
- Order of Merit winner: (Sweden) Johanna Gustavsson

The 2015 Swedish Golf Tour, known as the Nordea Tour for sponsorship reasons, was the 30th season of the Swedish Golf Tour, a series of professional golf tournaments for women held in Sweden and Norway.

A number of the tournaments also featured on the 2015 LET Access Series (LETAS).

== Schedule ==
The season consisted of 9 tournaments played between May and October, where two events were held in Norway.

Date	Tournament	Venue	Winner	Runner(s)-up	Purse (SEK)	Tour	Ref
24 May	PGA Halmstad Ladies Open at Haverdal	Haverdal	(Germany) Isi Gabsa	(Sweden) Jessica Ljungberg	€35,000	LETAS	
31 May	Drøbak Ladies Open	Drøbak, Norway	(Germany) Isi Gabsa	(Spain) Natalia Escuriola Martinez (a)	€35,000	LETAS	
28 Jun	SM Match	Ullna	(Sweden) Camilla Lennarth	(Sweden) Louise Ridderström (a)	200,000		
5 Jul	Borås Ladies Open	Borås	(Germany) Olivia Cowan	(Finland) Oona Vartiainen	€35,000	LETAS	
7 Aug	Norrporten Ladies Open	Sundsvall	(Germany) Olivia Cowan	(Finland) Krista Bakker	€35,000	LETAS	
13 Aug	Larvik Ladies Open	Larvik, Norway	(Sweden) Johanna Gustavsson	(Spain) Natalia Escuriola Martinez (a)	€35,000	LETAS	
22 Aug	Sölvesborg Ladies Open	Sölvesborg	(France) Ariane Provot	(Sweden) Lynn Carlsson (Scotland) Laura Murray	€35,000	LETAS	
18 Sep	Örebro Ladies Open	Örebro City	(Sweden) Natalie Wille	(Sweden) Louise Friberg	200,000		
10 Oct	Tourfinal Vellinge Open	Ljunghusen	(Sweden) Sarah Nilsson	(Sweden) Lynn Carlsson	300,000		

Swedish PGA Championship
Swedish Matchplay Championship

== See also ==
- 2015 Swedish Golf Tour (men's tour)
