= 2016 Swedish Golf Tour (women) =

31st season of the Swedish Golf Tour (women)

2016 Swedish Golf Tour season
- Duration: May 2016 – October 2016
- Number of official events: 9
- Most wins: 2 wins: (Sweden) Jenny Haglund
- Order of Merit winner: (Sweden) Jenny Haglund

The 2016 Swedish Golf Tour, known as the Nordea Tour for sponsorship reasons, was the 31st season of the Swedish Golf Tour, a series of professional golf tournaments for women held in Sweden and Norway.

A number of the tournaments also featured on the 2016 LET Access Series (LETAS).

== Schedule ==
The season consisted of 9 tournaments played between May and October, where two events were held in Norway.

Date	Tournament	Venue	Winner	Runner(s)-up	Purse (SEK)	Tour	Ref
21 May	PGA Halmstad Ladies Open at Haverdal	Haverdal	(Spain) María Parra	(Scotland) Michele Thomson	€40,000	LETAS	
19 Jun	Borås Ladies Open	Borås	(Sweden) Josephine Janson	(Hungary) Csilla Lajtai-Rozsa	€35,000	LETAS	
2 Jun	SM Match	Ullna	(Sweden) Johanna Björk	(Sweden) Isabella Ramsay	200,000		
5 Aug	Norrporten Ladies Open	Sundsvall	(Sweden) Jenny Haglund	(Austria) Sarah Schober	€40,000	LETAS	
13 Aug	Drøbak Ladies Open	Drøbak, Norway	(Spain) María Parra	(England) Charlotte Thompson	€40,000	LETAS	
20 Aug	Ladies Norwegian Open	Skjeberg, Norway	(Sweden) Linda Wessberg	(Sweden) Jenny Haglund	€50,000	LETAS	
3 Sep	Örebro Ladies Open	Örebro City	(Sweden) Johanna Gustavsson	(Sweden) Emma Nilsson (Sweden) Cajsa Persson	200,000		
17 Sep	Elisefarm Ladies Open	Elisefarm	(Scotland) Laura Murray	(Australia) Stacey Keating (Austria) Sarah Schober	€35,000	LETAS	
15 Oct	Tourfinal Vellinge Open	Ljunghusen	(Sweden) Jenny Haglund	(Sweden) Emma Nilsson	300,000		

Swedish PGA Championship
Swedish Matchplay Championship

== See also ==
- 2016 Swedish Golf Tour (men's tour)
