= 2017 Swedish Golf Tour (women) =

32nd season of the Swedish Golf Tour (women)

2017 Swedish Golf Tour season
- Duration: May 2017 – October 2017
- Number of official events: 9
- Most wins: 1
- Order of Merit winner: (Sweden) Sarah Nilsson

The 2017 Swedish Golf Tour was the 32nd season of the Swedish Golf Tour, a series of professional golf tournaments for women held in Sweden and Norway.

A number of the tournaments also featured in the 2017 LET Access Series (LETAS).

== Schedule ==
The season consisted of 9 tournaments played between May and October, where one event was held in Norway.

Date	Tournament	Venue	Winner	Runner(s)-up	Purse (SEK)	Tour	Ref
26 May	Forget Foundation PGA Championship	PGA Sweden National	(France) Valentine Derrey		€40,000	LETAS	
18 Jun	Ulricehamn Ladies Open	Ulricehamn	(Sweden) Lina Boqvist		100,000		
1 Jul	SM Match	Ullna Golf Club	(Sweden) Lynn Carlsson		200,000		
29 Jul	Johannesberg Ladies Open	Johannesberg	(Sweden) Martina Edberg		150,000		
4 Aug	Castellum Ladies Open	Sundsvall	(Spain) Luna Sobrón		€35,000	LETAS	
11 Aug	Ladies Norwegian Open	Moss & Rygge, Norway	(Sweden) Sarah Nilsson		300,000		
19 Aug	Flommen Ladies Open	Flommen	(Sweden) Filippa Möörk		100,000		
14 Sep	Säljfast Ladies Open	Sölvesborg	(Sweden) Jenny Haglund		100,000		
14 Oct	SGT Tourfinal Åhus KGK ProAm	Kristianstad	(Sweden) Josephine Janson		300,000		

Swedish PGA Championship
Swedish Matchplay Championship

== See also ==
- 2017 Swedish Golf Tour (men's tour)
