= Sarah Nilsson =

Swedish professional golfer

Personal information
- Nationality: Sweden
- Born: 24 July 1997 (age 29) Kristianstad, Sweden

Career
- Sport: Golf
- Turned professional: 2016
- Current tour: Ladies European Tour
- Former tours: LET Access Series; Swedish Golf Tour
- Professional wins: 4

Achievements and awards
- Swedish Golf Tour Order of Merit: 2017

Sarah Nilsson (born 24 July 1997) is a Swedish professional golfer. She won the Swedish Golf Tour Order of Merit in 2017 was a Ladies European Tour (LET) rookie in 2018.

== Personal life ==
Nilsson's sister Emma (three years older) is also a professional golfer on the Ladies European Tour. Both sisters played in the inaugural Saint-Malo Golf Mixed Open in 2019, the first professional event to see female and male golfers from two tours play for the same trophy, with their parents caddying for them.

== Career ==
Nilsson won the 2015 Tourfinal Vellinge Open on the Swedish Golf Tour while still an amateur. She turned professional and joined the 2016 LET Access Series as a teenager, and had four top-10 finishes in her rookie season. The following year, she won the Ladies Norwegian Open and the Swedish Golf Tour Order of Merit. In 2018, she made five LET starts, with a best finish of T15 at the dual-ranked Jabra Ladies Open.

Nilsson finished sixth at the Q-School for the 2019 Ladies European Tour behind Bronte Law, Linnea Ström, Esther Henseleit, Sian Evans and Leona Maguire, after losing a playoff to Maguire for the fifth and final full card. She started 14 LET tournaments in 2019 and finished 85th on the Order of Merit.

== Amateur wins ==
- 2011 Skandia Tour Skåne
- 2012 Skandia Cup Riksfinal
- 2014 Skandia Tour Elit

== Professional wins (4) ==
=== Swedish Golf Tour wins (3) ===
No.	Date	Tournament	Winning score	To par	Margin of victory	Runner(s)-up	Ref
1	10 Oct 2015	Tourfinal Vellinge Open (as an amateur)	73-70-75=218	+2	4 strokes	(Sweden) Lynn Carlsson	
2	11 Aug 2017	Ladies Norwegian Open	71-72-69=212	−4	2 strokes	(Sweden) Frida Gustafsson-Spång (Sweden) Jenny Haglund (Sweden) Cajsa Persson	
3	29 Sep 2018	Nøtterøy Open	69-69-72=210	−6	3 strokes	(Sweden) Isabella Ramsay	

=== Other wins (1) ===
- 2016 Sölvesborg Open
