= Ladies Norwegian Open =

Golf tournament on the Swedish Golf Tour

Tournament information
- Location: Østfold, Norway
- Established: 2016
- Course(s): Moss & Rygge GK; Skjeberg GK; Nøtterøy GK; Larvik GK
- Par: 72
- Tour(s): LET Access Series; Swedish Golf Tour
- Format: Stroke play
- Prize fund: €50,000 (2016)
- Month played: August

Current champion
- (Norway) Tonje Daffinrud

The Ladies Norwegian Open is a professional golf tournament on the Swedish Golf Tour and featured on the LET Access Series schedule in 2015 and 2016.

== Highlights ==
The 2015 edition saw a record-breaking 14-hole sudden-death playoff between Johanna Gustavsson of Sweden and Natalia Escuriola of Spain. Both players recorded an opening bogey on the first playoff hole, the 368 yard par-4 9th at Larvik Golf Club, which they played three times before alternating between the 1st and 9th holes until the 10th extra hole. They then moved back to the 9th hole until Gustavsson was able to break the deadlock on the 14th extra hole with a birdie three.

In 2016, the final day featured a special format, as it was played alongside the men's Norwegian Open over the Skjeberg course. It was the first time an event on the LET Access Series has featured this format, which follows that of the Oates Victorian Open, played at the Beach Links in Victoria, Australia.

== Winners ==
Year	Tour(s)	Venue	Winner	Country	Score	Margin of victory	Runner(s)-up	Ref
Moss & Rygge Open
2020	SGT	Moss & Rygge GK	Cancelled due to the COVID-19 pandemic					
2019	SGT	Moss & Rygge GK	Tonje Daffinrud	Norway	−15 (70-64-67=201)	8 strokes	(Sweden) Michaela Finn	
Nøtterøy Open
2018	SGT	Nøtterøy GK	Sarah Nilsson	Sweden	−6 (69-69-72=210)	3 strokes	(Sweden) Isabella Ramsay	
Ladies Norwegian Open
2017	SGT	Moss & Rygge GK	Sarah Nilsson	Sweden	−4 (71-72-69=212)	2 strokes	(Sweden) Frida Gustafsson-Spång (Sweden) Jenny Haglund (Sweden) Cajsa Persson	
2016	SGT · LETAS	Skjeberg GK	Linda Wessberg	Sweden	−13 (69-70-64=203)	3 strokes	(Sweden) Jenny Haglund	
Larvik Ladies Open
2015	SGT · LETAS	Larvik GK	Johanna Gustavsson	Sweden	−8 (70-68-70=208)	Playoff	(Spain) Natalia Escuriola (a)	

== See also ==
- Ladies Norwegian Challenge
