= 2013 Swedish Golf Tour (women) =

28th season of the Swedish Golf Tour (women)

2013 Swedish Golf Tour season
- Duration: May 2013 – September 2013
- Number of official events: 10
- Most wins: 1
- Order of Merit winner: (Sweden) Lina Boqvist

The 2013 Swedish Golf Tour, known as the Nordea Tour for sponsorship reasons, was the 28th season of the Swedish Golf Tour, a series of professional golf tournaments for women held in Sweden and Norway.

A number of the tournaments also featured on the 2013 LET Access Series (LETAS).

== Schedule ==
The season consisted of 10 tournaments played between May and September, where one event was held in Norway.

| Date | Tournament | Venue | Winner | Runner(s)-up | Purse (SEK) | Tour | Ref |
|---|---|---|---|---|---|---|---|
| 18 May | Kristianstad Åhus Ladies PGA Open | Kristianstad | (Sweden) Linn Andersson | (England) Eleanor Givens (Norway) Caroline Martens | €30,000 | LETAS | |
| 24 May | Sölvesborg Ladies Open | Sölvesborg | (Scotland) Heather MacRae | (Belgium) Chloé Leurquin (England) Kym Larratt | €30,000 | LETAS | |
| 16 Jun | Delsjö Ladies Open | Delsjö | (Sweden) Mikaela Parmlid | (Sweden) Lina Boqvist | 250,000 | | |
| 28 Jun | Frontwalker Ladies Open | Botkyrka | (Sweden) Elin Andersson | (Sweden) Camilla Lennarth | 200,000 | | |
| 27 Jul | Ingarö Ladies Open | Ingarö | (Scotland) Pamela Feggans | (Sweden) Antonella Cvitan (Sweden) Madelene Sagström (a) | €30,000 | LETAS | |
| 3 Jul | SM Match | Brollsta | (Sweden) Anjelika Hammar | (Sweden) Lina Boqvist | 150,000 | | |
| 24 Aug | A6 Ladies Open | A6 | (Denmark) Nanna Koerstz Madsen (a) | (Sweden) Eva Bjärvall (Sweden) Josephine Janson | 200,000 | | |
| 1 Aug | Norrporten Ladies Open | Sundsvall | (England) Lauren Taylor | (Netherlands) Chrisje De Vries | €30,000 | LETAS | |
| 20 Sep | Ladies Norwegian Challenge | Hauger, Norway | (Denmark) Nicole Broch Larsen | (South Africa) Laurette Maritz | €30,000 | LETAS | |
| 28 Sep | Tourfinal Svedala Open | Bokskogen | (Sweden) Julia Davidsson | (Sweden) Linnea Torsson | 300,000 | | |

Swedish PGA Championship
Swedish Matchplay Championship

== See also ==
- 2013 Swedish Golf Tour (men's tour)
