= Borås Ladies Open =

Coordinates: 57.724°N 12.787°E

Tournament information
- Location: Borås, Västra Götaland County, Sweden
- Established: 2014
- Course: Borås Golf Club
- Par: 72
- Tours: LET Access Series; Swedish Golf Tour
- Format: Stroke play
- Prize fund: €35,000
- Month played: June
- Final year: 2016

Tournament record score
- Aggregate: 209 Olivia Cowan
- To par: −7 as above

Final champion
- (Sweden) Josephine Janson

Location map
- Location in Europe Location in Västra Götaland County

The Borås Ladies Open was a women's professional golf tournament on the LET Access Series held in Sweden in 2014 and 2016. It was part of a series of Swedish Golf Tour tournaments played between 2006 and 2017 at various courses in Västra Götaland County.

== History ==
Lisa Hed won her 8th and final Swedish Golf Tour (SGT) title at the 2006 tournament. In 2007, Caroline Hedwall won the fourth of her six SGT titles she captured as an amateur at Falköping Golf Club.

Borås Golf Club hosted its first LET/LETAS tournament in 2015, after the 2014 event was held in Vänersborg. Borås was slated to host the Borås European Masters on the 1987 Ladies European Tour but the event got stricken from the schedule.

In 2015, Olivia Cowan won her second title of the season at Borås Golf Club, on her way to top the LETAS Order of Merit. In 2016, Josephine Janson recorded a wire-to-wire win for her first professional title.

== Winners ==
Year	Tour(s) (Note: LET − Ladies European Tour; LETAS − LET Access Series; SGT − Swedish Golf Tour.)	Winner	Score	Margin of victory	Runner-up	Purse (SEK)	Venue	Ref
Ulricehamn Ladies Open
2017	SGT	(Sweden) Lina Boqvist	−10 (67-68-71=206)	4 strokes	(Sweden) Frida Gustafsson-Spång	100,000	Ulricehamn Golf Club	
Borås Ladies Open
2016	SGT · LETAS	(Sweden) Josephine Janson	−6 (69-68-73=210)	1 stroke	(Hungary) Csilla Lajtai-Rozsa	€35,000	Borås Golf Club	
2015	SGT · LETAS	(Germany) Olivia Cowan	−7 (68-69-72=209)	1 stroke	(Finland) Oona Vartiainen	€35,000	Borås Golf Club	
Onsjö Ladies Open
2014	SGT · LETAS	(Sweden) Lina Boqvist	–6 (72-69-69=210)	Playoff	(Sweden) Lynn Carlsson	€30,000	Onsjö Golf Club	
2010–2013: No tournament
Dalsland Resort Ladies Open
2010	SGT	(Sweden) Louise Larsson	−12 (72-66-63=201)	1 stroke	(Finland) Kaisa Ruuttila	300,000	Mellerud Golf Club	
2009	SGT	(Finland) Hanna-Leena Ronkainen	−3 (70-69-71=210)	2 strokes	(South Africa) Tandi Cuningham	300,000	Mellerud Golf Club	
2008: No tournament
Hotel Falköping Ladies Cup
2007	SGT	(Sweden) Caroline Hedwall (a)	−1 (72-71=143)	1 stroke	(Spain) Nuria Clau	150,000	Falköping Golf Club	
Falköping Ladies Open
2006	SGT	(Sweden) Lisa Hed	E (73-74-69=216)	1 stroke	(Sweden) Antonella Cvitan	150,000	Falköping Golf Club	
1988–2005: No tournament
Borås European Masters
1987	~~SGT · LET~~	Cancelled					Borås Golf Club	
