= Sölvesborg Ladies Open =

Swedish professional golf tournament, 1995–2018

Tournament information
- Location: Sölvesborg, Sweden
- Established: 1995
- Courses: Sölvesborg Golf Club; Elisefarm Golf Club (2016)
- Tours: LET Access Series; Swedish Golf Tour
- Format: 54-hole stroke play
- Prize fund: SEK 175,000
- Final year: 2018

Tournament record score
- Aggregate: 207 Jenny Haglund (2017)
- To par: −9 as above

Final champion
- (Sweden) Isabella Ramsay

The Sölvesborg Ladies Open was a women's professional golf tournament on the Swedish Golf Tour played between 1995 and 2018. It was included on the LET Access Series from 2013 to 2016. It was always held at Sölvesborg Golf Club in Sölvesborg, Sweden, except in 2016 when it was hosted at nearby Elisefarm Golf Club in Hörby.

== Winners ==
Year	Tour(s)	Winner	Score	Margin of victory	Runner(s)-up	Prize fund (SEK)	Ref.
Sölvesborg Ladies Open
1995	SGT	(Sweden) Anna Berg (a)	217 (+1)	Playoff	(Sweden) Malin Burström (Sweden) Åsa Gottmo	75,000	
1996–2001: No tournament
Sparbanken Ladies Open
2002	SGT	(Finland) Minea Blomqvist (a)	214 (–2)	1 stroke	(Sweden) Sara Eklund	150,000	
2003–2012: No tournament
Sölvesborg Ladies Open
2013	SGT · LETAS	(Scotland) Heather MacRae	214 (–2)	Playoff	(Belgium) Chloé Leurquin (England) Kym Larratt	€30,000	
2014	SGT · LETAS	(Sweden) Emma Westin	214 (–2)	2 strokes	(Switzerland) Melanie Maetzler	€30,000	
2015	SGT · LETAS	(France) Ariane Provot	208 (–8)	Playoff	(Sweden) Lynn Carlsson (Scotland) Laura Murray	€35,000	
Elisefarm Ladies Open
2016	SGT · LETAS	(Scotland) Laura Murray	209 (–7)	2 strokes	(Australia) Stacey Keating (Austria) Sarah Schober	€35,000	
Säljfast Ladies Open
2017	SGT	(Sweden) Jenny Haglund	207 (–9)	3 strokes	(Sweden) Martina Edberg	100,000	
Säljfast Ladies PGA Championship
2018	SGT	(Sweden) Isabella Ramsay	214 (–2)	Playoff	(Sweden) Sofie Bringner	175,000	
