= Anne van Dam =

Dutch golfer

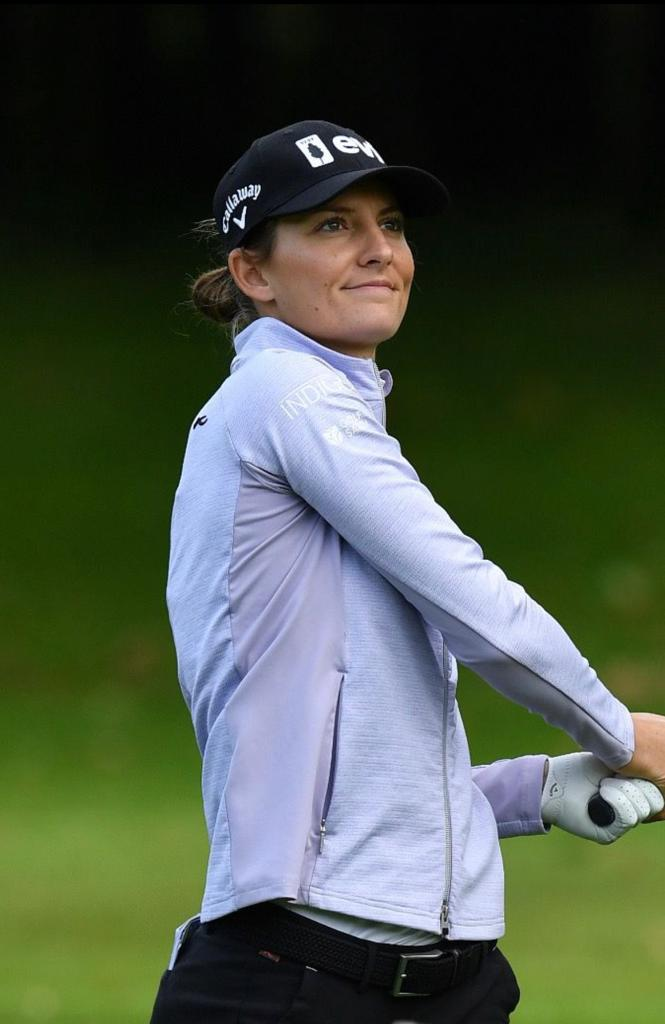

Personal information
- Nationality: Netherlands
- Born: 2 October 1995 (age 31) Arnhem, Netherlands
- Height: 5 ft 11 in (180 cm)

Career
- Sport: Golf
- Turned professional: 2015
- Current tours: LPGA Tour (joined 2019); Ladies European Tour (joined 2015)
- Former tours: LET Access Series; Symetra Tour
- Professional wins: 7

Number of wins by tour
- Ladies European Tour: 5
- WPGA Tour of Australasia: 1
- Other: 2

Best results in LPGA major championships
- Chevron Championship: T44: 2020
- Women's PGA C'ship: T69: 2020
- U.S. Women's Open: CUT: 2018, 2019, 2020
- Women's British Open: T17: 2024
- Evian Championship: T37: 2018

Anne van Dam (born 2 October 1995) is a Dutch professional golfer who plays on the LPGA Tour and Ladies European Tour, where she has five wins. She played in the 2019 Solheim Cup and the 2020 Summer Olympics.

== Career ==
Van Dam turned professional in 2015. She began playing on the Ladies European Tour (LET) and the LET Access Series (LETAS), where she won the HLR Golf Academy Open in Finland.

In 2016, she again played on both tours and won the CitizenGuard LETAS Trophy on home turf, and the Xiamen International Ladies Open in China, her first LET title. In 2017, she played mainly on the LET where she finished 3rd at the Hero Women's Indian Open and fourth at the Lacoste Ladies Open de France and Omega Dubai Ladies Masters. She finished fifth on the LET Order of Merit.

In 2018, van Dam divided her time between the LET and the Symetra Tour in the United States, where her best finish was a tie for 8th at the FireKeepers Casino Hotel Championship. She won twice on the LET, at the Estrella Damm Ladies Open and Andalucia Costa Del Sol Open De España Femenino, and finished second in the LET Order of Merit behind Georgia Hall.

In 2019, she won twice on the LET, the ActewAGL Canberra Classic and the Andalucia Costa Del Sol Open De España Femenino. She earned a spot on the European Solheim Cup team via her LET Solheim Cup points ranking.

Van Dam earned her LPGA Tour card for 2019 by finishing T-15 in the inaugural LPGA Q-Series. In her rookie season, she made the cut in 13 of 21 starts and recorded a season-best finish of T-6 at the Ladies Scottish Open, to finish 82nd in the rankings. In 2020 she made 11 cuts in 14 starts, and finished 81st. By 2021 she dropped to 120th in the season rankings, and in 2022 to 150th.

Van Dam is known for her driving distance. She led the category on the LET in 2017 and 2018, and held the lead on both the LET and LPGA Tour as of August 2019.

== Professional wins (7) ==
=== Ladies European Tour wins (5) ===
No.	Date	Tournament	Winning score	To par	Margin of victory	Runner(s)-up
1	16 Oct 2016	Xiamen International Ladies Open^{1}	70-66-67-68=271	−17	1 stroke	(China) Yu Ting-shi
2	23 Sep 2018	Estrella Damm Ladies Open	64-64-65-65=258	−26	8 strokes	(Sweden) Caroline Hedwall (South Korea) Selin Hyun (a) (Germany) Caroline Masson
3	22 Nov 2018	Andalucia Costa Del Sol Open De España Femenino	68-67-66-70=271	−13	3 strokes	(Spain) Azahara Muñoz
4	3 Mar 2019	ActewAGL Canberra Classic^{2}	68-63-65=196	−17	3 strokes	(Slovenia) Katja Pogačar
5	1 Dec 2019	Andalucia Costa Del Sol Open De España Femenino (2)	68-69-68-70=275	−13	1 stroke	(India) Aditi Ashok (Denmark) Nanna Koerstz Madsen

^{1} Co-sanctioned by the China LPGA Tour
^{2} Co-sanctioned by the ALPG Tour

Ladies European Tour playoff record (0–1)

No.	Year	Tournament	Opponents	Result
1	2023	KPMG Women's Irish Open	(Sweden) Lisa Pettersson (Denmark) Smilla Tarning Sønderby	Sønderby won with eagle on first extra hole

=== LET Access Series wins (2) ===
No.	Date	Tournament	Winning score	To par	Margin of victory	Runner(s)-up
1	30 Aug 2015	HLR Golf Academy Open	72-62-73=207	−6	3 strokes	(Sweden) Johanna Gustavsson
2	16 Jul 2016	CitizenGuard LETAS Trophy	70-70-67=207	−12	3 strokes	(France) Justine Dreher (Denmark) Daisy Nielsen

== Results in LPGA majors ==
Results not in chronological order.

Tournament	2016	2017	2018	2019	2020	2021	2022	2023	2024
Chevron Championship				CUT	T44				
U.S. Women's Open			CUT	CUT	CUT				
Women's PGA Championship				T71	T69	CUT			
The Evian Championship		CUT	T37	T52	NT	CUT			T44
Women's British Open	CUT	T39	CUT	T44	T45	CUT			T17

Did not play

CUT = missed the half-way cut
NT = no tournament
T = tied

=== Summary ===
Tournament	Wins	2nd	3rd	Top-5	Top-10	Top-25	Events	Cuts made
Chevron Championship	0	0	0	0	0	0	2	1
U.S. Women's Open	0	0	0	0	0	0	3	0
Women's PGA Championship	0	0	0	0	0	0	3	2
The Evian Championship	0	0	0	0	0	0	5	3
Women's British Open	0	0	0	0	0	1	7	4
Totals	0	0	0	0	0	1	20	10

- Most consecutive cuts made – 6 (2019 Women's PGA – 2020 Women's PGA)
- Longest streak of top-10s – 0

== Team appearances ==
Amateur

- European Girls' Team Championship (representing the Netherlands): 2012
- Espirito Santo Trophy (representing the Netherlands): 2012, 2014
- European Ladies' Team Championship: (representing Netherlands): 2014
- Junior Solheim Cup (representing Europe): 2013

Professional

- Solheim Cup (representing Europe): 2019 (winners)

=== Solheim Cup record ===
Year	Total matches	Total W–L–H	Singles W–L–H	Foursomes W–L–H	Fourballs W–L–H	Points won	Points %
Career	4	1–3–0	0–1–0	0–1–0	1–1–0	1	25.0
2019	4	1–3–0	0–1–0 lost to L. Salas 1 dn	0–1–0 lost w/ A. Nordqvist 2&1	1–1–0 won w/ S. Pettersen 4&2 lost w/ S. Pettersen 1 dn	1	25.0
