= Johanna Gustavsson =

Swedish professional golfer (born 1992)

Johanna Wrigley
Personal information
- Full name: Johanna Erika Wrigley
- Nationality: Sweden
- Born: 13 December 1992 (age 33) Örebro, Sweden
- Height: 5 ft 7 in (170 cm)
- Spouse: Alex Wrigley (m. 2022)

Career
- Sport: Golf
- Turned professional: 2012
- Former tours: Ladies European Tour (2016–2025); LET Access Series; Swedish Golf Tour
- Professional wins: 5

Number of wins by tour
- Ladies European Tour: 1
- Other: 4

Best results in LPGA major championships
- Chevron Championship: DNP
- Women's PGA C'ship: DNP
- U.S. Women's Open: DNP
- Women's British Open: T50: 2023
- Evian Championship: T28: 2023

Achievements and awards
- Swedish Golf Tour Order of Merit: 2015
- Ladies European Tour Player of the Year: 2023
Medal record
European Golf Team Championships
Bronze medal – third place	2018 Gleneagles	Mixed team

Johanna Wrigley (née Gustavsson; born 13 December 1992) is a Swedish professional golfer and Ladies European Tour player. In 2022, she was runner-up at the Saudi Ladies International, the Women's NSW Open and the Aramco Team Series – Bangkok, before captaining the winning team at the Aramco Team Series – New York. She finished 3rd in the 2022 Race to Costa Del Sol rankings, completing a Swedish podium sweep alongside Linn Grant and Maja Stark. In 2023, she won the Lacoste Ladies Open de France and was named LET Player of the Year.

== Professional career ==
Gustavsson finished in fourth place at the Lalla Aicha Ladies European Tour School pre-qualifying in 2014, but narrowly missed out at the final stage, and joined the 2015 LET Access Series. She won her first professional event, the 2015 Larvik Ladies Open, in a record-breaking 14-hole sudden-death playoff against Natalia Escuriola of Spain. Both players recorded an opening bogey on the first playoff hole, the 368 yard par-4 9th at Larvik Golf Club in Norway, which they played three times before alternating between the 1st and 9th holes until the 10th extra hole. They then moved back to the 9th hole until Gustavsson broke the deadlock on the 14th extra hole with a birdie three.

The Larvik Ladies Open victory, dual-ranked between the LET Access Series and the Swedish Golf Tour, helped Gustavsson win the 2015 Swedish Golf Tour Order of Merit and place fourth on the LETAS Order of Merit, securing her card for the 2016 Ladies European Tour.

In 2017, she was runner-up at the Jabra Ladies Open, earning entry to her first major, the 2017 Evian Championship, where she did not make the cut.

Gustavsson represented her country at the 2018 European Golf Team Championships, teaming up with Oscar Florén, Daniel Jennevret and Julia Engström to win the bronze medal in the mixed team competition.

In 2019 she ended the season ranked 46th on the LET Order of Merit, and in 2020 she finished 19th, after making the cut at the Women's British Open and recording top-10 finishes at the Australian Ladies Classic and the Saudi Ladies Team International.

In 2022, Gustavsson took her game to a new level, and finished runner-up in three of her first nine LET starts. In March, she was joint runner-up with Kristýna Napoleaová behind Georgia Hall at the 2022 Saudi Ladies International. In May, she was solo runner-up behind Maja Stark at the Women's NSW Open in Australia, and again at the Aramco Team Series – Bangkok, 3 strokes behind Manon De Roey. The run left her in third spot in the LET Order of Merit at the end of the season, behind only her compatriots Linn Grant and Maja Stark, completing a Swedish podium sweep.

She captained the winning team at the 2022 Aramco Team Series – New York, and together with Jessica Karlsson and Karolin Lampert won by a stroke ahead of a team captained by American Nelly Korda.

In 2023, Gustavsson captured her maiden LET victory in September at the Lacoste Ladies Open de France. She finished seventh on the Race to Costa del Sol and was named LET Player of the Year at the end of season awards.

In 2024, she captained the runner-up team at the Aramco Team Series – Korea, finishing two strokes behind Danielle Kang's team, and tied for 4th at the Scandinavian Mixed, behind only Linn Grant, Calum Hill, and Sebastian Söderberg.

At the end of 2025, Gustavsson announced her retirement, after ten seasons on the LET.

== Personal life ==
Gustavsson married English golfer Alex Wrigley in 2022 and started playing under her married name, Johanna Wrigley, in 2025.

== Amateur wins ==
- 2009 (1) Skandia Tour Regional #4 - Södermanland
- 2010 (1) Skandia Tour Regional #1 - Östergötland
- 2011 (1) Skandia Tour Riks #6 - Västergötland
- 2013 (3) Skandia Tour Riks #2 - Östergötland, Skandia Tour Regional #1 - Örebro Län, McDonalds Juniorpokal

== Professional wins (5) ==
=== Ladies European Tour wins (1) ===
No.	Date	Tournament	Winning score	To par	Margin of victory	Runner-up
1	30 Sep 2023	Lacoste Ladies Open de France	66-66-65=197	−16	3 strokes	(Sweden) Moa Folke

=== LET Access Series wins (2) ===
No.	Date	Tournament	Winning score	To par	Margin of victory	Runner-up
1	13 Aug 2015	Larvik Ladies Open	70-68-70=208	−8	Playoff	(Spain) Natalia Escuriola
2	6 Jul 2018	Ribeira Sacra Patrimonio de la Humanidad International Ladies Open	64-64-66=194	−16	2 strokes	(France) Astrid Vayson de Pradenne

LET Access Series playoff record (1–1)

No.	Year	Tournament	Opponent	Result
1	2015	Larvik Ladies Open	(Spain) Natalia Escuriola	Won with birdie on fourteenth extra hole
2	2017	Jabra Ladies Open	(France) Isabelle Boineau	Lost to birdie on first extra hole

=== Swedish Golf Tour wins (1) ===
No.	Date	Tournament	Winning score	To par	Margin of victory	Runners-up
1	2016	Örebro Ladies Open	71-70-71=212	–4	1 stroke	(Sweden) Emma Nilsson (Sweden) Cajsa Persson

=== Santander Golf Tour wins (1) ===
No.	Date	Tournament	Winning score	To par	Margin of victory	Runner-up	Ref
1	2019	Santander Golf Tour Barcelona	71-71=142	–2	Playoff	(Finland) Krista Bakker	

== Results in LPGA majors ==
Tournament	2017	2018	2019	2020	2021	2022	2023	2024
Chevron Championship								
U.S. Women's Open								
Women's PGA Championship								
The Evian Championship	CUT			NT		T60	T28	CUT
Women's British Open					CUT	CUT	T50	T71

Did not play

CUT = missed the half-way cut
NT = no tournament
T = tied

== Team appearances ==
Professional

- European Championships (representing Sweden): 2018
