= Kristianstad Ladies Open =

Coordinates: 55.9164°N 14.3687°E

Tournament information
- Location: Åhus, Kristianstad, Sweden
- Established: 1986
- Course: Kristianstad Golf Club – Åhus Östra Course
- Par: 72
- Tours: Ladies European Tour; LET Access Series (2012–14)
- Format: Stroke play
- Prize fund: €400,000
- Month played: September

Current champion
- (Sweden) Maja Stark

Location in Europe

The Kristianstad Ladies Open is a professional golf tournament on the Ladies European Tour (LET).

The tournament is played at Kristianstad Golf Club in Åhus, southern Sweden. It was first played in 1986, before being cancelled in 1987. It featured on the LET Access Series 2012–2014, and was slated to return to the LET schedule in 2020 as the Creekhouse Ladies Open, but the event was postponed to 2021 due to the COVID-19 pandemic.

== Winners ==
Year	Tour	Winner	Country	Score	Margin of victory	Runner-up	Purse
Creekhouse Ladies Open
2021	LET	Maja Stark	Sweden	−9 (72-65-71-71=279)	4 strokes	(Sweden) Linn Grant	€400,000
2020	LET	Cancelled (Note: Postponed due to the COVID-19 pandemic.)					€400,000
Åhus Open
2019	SGT	Michaela Finn	Sweden	−5 (70-71-70=211)	1 stroke	(Sweden) Sara Kjellker (a)	SEK 130,000
2018: No tournament
SGT Tourfinal Åhus KGK ProAm
2017	SGT	Josephine Janson	Sweden	+4 (78-70-72=220)	2 strokes	(Sweden) Johanna Gustavsson (Sweden) Sarah Nilsson	SEK 300,000
2015–2016: No tournament
Kristianstad Åhus Ladies PGA Open
2014	LETAS	Isabella Ramsay	Sweden	−2 (73-70-71=214)	1 stroke	(Denmark) Emily Kristine Pedersen (a)	€30,000
2013	LETAS	Linn Andersson (a)	Sweden	+4 (69-74-77=220)	Playoff	(England) Eleanor Givens (Norway) Caroline Martens	€30,000
Kristianstad Åhus Ladies Open
2012	LETAS	Cecilie Lundgreen	Norway	+6 (74-71-77=222)	1 stroke	(France) Marion Ricordeau	€30,000
1988–2011: No tournament
Kristianstad Ladies Open
1987	LET	Cancelled					SEK 500,000
1986	LET	Corinne Dibnah	Australia	E (75-72-71-70=288)	1 stroke	(Sweden) Liselotte Neumann	SEK 400,000
