= Ladies Norwegian Challenge =

Tournament information
- Location: Østfold, Norway
- Established: 2012
- Course(s): Nes GC; Drøbak GC; Losby GC; Hauger GC
- Par: 72
- Tour(s): LET Access Series; Swedish Golf Tour
- Format: Stroke play
- Prize fund: SEK 300,000
- Month played: August
- Final year: 2018

Final champion
- (Sweden) My Leander

The Ladies Norwegian Challenge was a professional golf tournament on the Swedish Golf Tour and the LET Access Series, held in Norway.

== Winners ==
Year	Tour(s)	Venue	Winner	Country	Score	Margin of victory	Runner-up	Purse (SEK)	Ref
Nes Open
2018	SGT	Nes GC	My Leander	Sweden	−2 (73-70-71=214)	Playoff	(Sweden) Frida Gustafsson-Spång	300,000	
2017	No tournament								
Drøbak Ladies Open
2016	SGT · LETAS	Drøbak GC	María Parra (a)	Spain	−14 (66-71-65=202)	Playoff	(England) Charlotte Thompson	€40,000	
2015	SGT · LETAS	Drøbak GC	Isi Gabsa	Germany	−12 (69-68-67=204)	2 strokes	(Spain) Natalia Escuriola (a)	€35,000	
Ladies Norwegian Challenge
2014	SGT · LETAS	Losby GC	Emma Nilsson	Sweden	−3 (69-72=141)	2 strokes	(Norway) Rachel Raastad	€30,000	
2013	SGT · LETAS	Hauger GC	Nicole Broch Larsen	Denmark	−4 (73-66-73=212)	4 strokes	(South Africa) Laurette Maritz	€30,000	
2012	SGT · LETAS	Hauger GC	Marianne Skarpnord	Norway	−4 (73-66-73=212)	5 strokes	(Sweden) Daniela Holmqvist (a)	€25,000	

== See also ==
- Ladies Norwegian Open
