= Nuria Iturrioz =

Spanish professional golfer (born 1995)

Personal information
- Full name: Nuria Iturrioz
- Nationality: Spain
- Born: 16 December 1995 (age 30) Son Servera, Spain
- Height: 5 ft 7 in (170 cm)

Career
- Sport: Golf
- Turned professional: 2015
- Current tours: Ladies European Tour (joined 2016); LPGA Tour (joined 2020)
- Former tour: Symetra Tour (joined 2018)
- Professional wins: 9

Number of wins by tour
- Ladies European Tour: 5
- Epson Tour: 1
- Other: 3

Best results in LPGA major championships
- Chevron Championship: DNP
- Women's PGA C'ship: T53: 2019
- U.S. Women's Open: CUT: 2020
- Women's British Open: T57: 2018
- Evian Championship: T64: 2017

Nuria Iturrioz (born 16 December 1995) is a Spanish professional golfer on the Ladies European Tour (LET) and LPGA Tour. She has five LET career wins, including the 2016 and 2019 Lalla Meryem Cup, 2019 Omega Dubai Moonlight Classic and the 2023 La Sella Open.

== Amateur career ==
Iturrioz was born in Palma de Mallorca and had a successful amateur career. She was part of the National Team and represented Spain in the European Girls' Team Championship and European Ladies' Team Championship. In 2012, she won the Madrid Ladies Championship and was runner-up at the Spanish National Ladies Championship behind Camilla Hedberg.

She won the 2013 Spanish International Stroke Play, and the 2014 Spanish International Stroke Play ahead of Ana Peláez in second. In 2015, she was runner-up at the 2015 Portuguese International Ladies Amateur Championship, one stroke behind Olivia Cowan, and won the 2015 Internationaux de France U21 – Trophée Esmond, beating Agathe Laisné 4&2 in the final.

She won the 2015 Vagliano Trophy with continental Europe.

== Professional career ==
Iturrioz turned professional in 2015 after she finished fourth at LET Q-School, and joined the LET in 2016. She won the Lalla Meryem Cup as a rookie and finished 10th on the Order of Merit rankings, but missed out on the LET Rookie of the Year award to Aditi Ashok.

In 2019, she won the Lalla Meryem Cup again and won two more tournaments in quick succession including the Omega Dubai Moonlight Classic to finish fourth on the 2019 Ladies European Tour Order of Merit rankings.

Iturrioz finished tied for 72nd at the final stage of the 2017 LPGA Qualifying Tournament to earn membership for the 2018 Symetra Tour season. She received one of two sponsor invites for the 2019 Women's PGA Championship, where she made the cut. She took the lead at the 2019 Symetra Tour Championship with an opening round of 67. At the 2019 LPGA Qualifying Tournament, she tied for 30th to earn membership for the 2020 LPGA Tour season.

She was runner-up at the 2019 Australian Ladies Classic, the 2020 Open de España Femenino behind Emily Kristine Pedersen, and also at the 2021 Tipsport Czech Ladies Open, behind Atthaya Thitikul.

In 2023, Iturrioz won the team event at the Aramco Team Series – Florida in May together with Pauline Roussin and Trish Johnson. She also held the lead in the individual event by one stroke over compatriot Carlota Ciganda heading into the last day, but a final round 83 saw her finish in a tie for 28th. She won the La Sella Open in July and the Campeonato de España in Málaga in December.

== Amateur wins ==
- 2012 Madrid Ladies Championship
- 2013 Campeonato de Madrid
- 2014 Copa Andalucia, Spanish International Stroke Play
- 2015 Internationaux de France U21 – Trophée Esmond, Campeonato de España Amateur

== Professional wins (9) ==
=== Ladies European Tour wins (5) ===
No.	Date	Tournament	Winning score	To par	Margin of victory	Runner(s)-up	Winner's share (€)
1	8 May 2016	Lalla Meryem Cup	70-72-70-65=277	−11	6 strokes	(England) Florentyna Parker	67,500
2	28 Apr 2019	Lalla Meryem Cup (2)	68-71-70-70=279	−14	7 strokes	(Sweden) Caroline Hedwall (Sweden) Lina Boqvist	67,500
3	3 May 2019	Omega Dubai Moonlight Classic	67-68-71=206	−10	1 stroke	(Germany) Olivia Cowan (Germany) Esther Henseleit	38,193
4	23 Jul 2023	La Sella Open	68-70-67=205	−11	Playoff	(Germany) Laura Fünfstück	150,000
5	7 Aug 2025	Aramco Houston Championship	68-67-68=203	−13	2 strokes	(Spain) Carlota Ciganda (England) Charley Hull	225,000

Ladies European Tour playoff record (1–0)

No.	Year	Tournament	Opponent	Result
1	2023	La Sella Open	(Germany) Laura Fünfstück	Won with par on second extra hole

=== Symetra Tour wins (1) ===
No.	Date	Tournament	Winning score	To par	Margin of victory	Runner-up	Winner's share ($)
1	23 May 2019	Zimmer Biomet Championship	64-71-70-71=276	−12	2 strokes	(Canada) Maddie Szeryk	45,000

=== Santander Golf Tour wins (3) ===
No.	Date	Tournament	Winning score	To par	Margin of victory	Runner(s)-up
1	12 Apr 2019	Santander Golf Tour Málaga	77-63=140	−4	Playoff	(Spain) María Parra
2	5 May 2023	Santander Golf Tour Cádiz (with Amaia Latorre)	62-66=128	−6	3 strokes	(Spain) Carmen Alonso & (Spain) Marta Martín
3	1 Dec 2023	Santander Golf Tour Málaga (Campeonato de España)	72-69-69=210	−6	1 stroke	(Spain) María Parra

== Team appearances ==
Amateur

- European Girls' Team Championship (representing Spain): 2012, 2013
- European Ladies' Team Championship (representing Spain): 2014, 2015
- Vagliano Trophy (representing Continent of Europe): 2015 (winners)

Professional

- The Queens (representing Europe): 2016
