= Isi Gabsa =

German professional golfer

Personal information
- Full name: Isabell Gabsa
- Nationality: Germany
- Born: 7 June 1995 (age 31) Munich, Germany

Career
- Sport: Golf
- Turned professional: 2013
- Current tour: LPGA Tour (joined 2019)
- Former tours: Symetra Tour (joined 2016); LET Access Series; Ladies European Tour (joined 2013)
- Professional wins: 3

Number of wins by tour
- Epson Tour: 1

Best results in LPGA major championships
- Chevron Championship: CUT: 2024
- Women's PGA C'ship: T54: 2019
- U.S. Women's Open: T51: 2022
- Women's British Open: CUT: 2017
- Evian Championship: 73rd: 2022

Isabell "Isi" Gabsa (born 7 June 1995) is a German professional golfer who currently plays on the LPGA Tour.

== Amateur career ==
Gabsa was member of the National Team and represented Germany at the European Girls' Team Championship in 2011 and 2012, where her team finished 4th and 6th respectively.

== Professional career ==
Gabsa turned professional after she qualified for the LET in December 2012, at seventeen the youngest German player at the time to do so. She struggled on the LET but had better success in LET Access Series events, and finished runner up at the 2013 Azores Ladies Open and solo third at the 2014 HLR Golf Academy Open in Finland.

In May 2015 Gabsa won the PGA Halmstad Ladies Open at Haverdal in Sweden and the Drøbak Ladies Open in Norway back to back, and ended the season 3rd in the 2015 LET Access Series Order of Merit, which earned her membership for the 2016 Ladies European Tour.

In 2016 Gabsa also joined the Symetra Tour, and divided her time between it and the LET in 2016 and 2017. In 2018 she concentrated on the Symetra Tour where she won the Forsyth Classic, which helped her finish 9th on the Money list at the end of the season to gain a fully exempt card on the LPGA Tour for the 2019 season.

== Professional wins (3) ==
=== Symetra Tour wins (1) ===
No.	Date	Tournament	Winning score	Margin of victory	Runner-up
1	17 Jun 2018	Forsyth Classic	−13 (68-65-70=203)	Playoff	(United States) Jillian Hollis

=== LET Access Series wins (2) ===
No.	Date	Tournament	Winning score	Margin of victory	Runner-up
1	24 May 2015	PGA Halmstad Ladies Open at Haverdal	−5 (70-71-70=211)	3 strokes	(Sweden) Jessica Ljungberg
2	31 May 2015	Drøbak Ladies Open	−12 (69-68-67=204)	2 strokes	(Spain) Natalia Escuriola (a)

== Team appearances ==
Amateur

- European Girls' Team Championship (representing Germany): 2011, 2012

Professional

- European Championships (representing Germany): 2018
