= Cajsa Persson =

Swedish professional golfer

Personal information
- Full name: Cajsa Persson
- Nationality: Sweden
- Born: 28 September 1993 (age 33) Jönköping, Sweden
- Height: 5 ft 10 in (1.78 m)

Career
- Sport: Golf
- College: Iowa State University
- Turned professional: 2016
- Former tours: Ladies European Tour (2017–2019); LET Access Series; Swedish Golf Tour
- Professional wins: 1
Medal record
European Golf Team Championships
| Gold medal – first place | 2018 Gleneagles | Women's team |

Cajsa Persson (born 28 September 1993) is a Swedish professional golfer and former Ladies European Tour player. She won the 2018 European Golf Team Championships together with Linda Wessberg.

== Early life and amateur career ==
Persson was born in Jönköping, Sweden. She had success on the domestic junior golf circuit between 2009 and 2011 winning seven tournaments, and in 2012, she lost a playoff at the Frontwalker Ladies Open on the Swedish Golf Tour to Isabella Ramsay. Her older sister Lisa played college golf at Sacramento State University.

Persson played college golf at Iowa State University with the Iowa State Cyclones women's golf team between 2012 and 2016. She was one of the best golfers in school history, recording the fourth-best career stroke average in the ISU record book. Persson played in four NCAA Regionals, earned All-Tournament honors at the Big 12 Championship three times (2013, 2015, 2016), and helped the Cyclones qualify for their first NCAA Division I women's golf championship in 2014.

== Professional career ==
Persson turned professional in 2016 and joined the Swedish Golf Tour, where her best finish was tied second alongside Emma Nilsson at the Örebro Ladies Open, a stroke behind Johanna Gustavsson. In 2017, she was runner-up behind Sarah Nilsson at the Ladies Norwegian Open, an LET Access Series event.

Persson earned her 2017 Ladies European Tour card after finishing 11th at the Lalla Aicha Tour Final Qualifying in Morocco, and played on the LET for three seasons between 2017 and 2019. Her best finish came at the 2018 Jabra Ladies Open at Evian Resort Golf Club, where she finished third behind Astrid Vayson de Pradenne and Karolin Lampert.

Persson won gold at the 2018 European Golf Team Championships at Gleneagles together with Linda Wessberg, after they beat a Great Britain team with Georgia Hall & Laura Davies in the semi-final and France in the 20th hole of the final.

== Amateur wins ==
- 2009 JC-Marwin Cup, Växjö Junior Open, Sportex Open
- 2010 Skandia Tour riks #3 - Örebro
- 2011 Skandia Tour Riks #2 - Småland, Chalmers Junior Open, JC Marwin Cup

== Professional wins ==
- 2016 Kalmar Ladies Open (SGF Golf Ranking)

== Playoff record ==
Swedish Golf Tour playoff record (0–1)

| No. | Year | Tournament | Opponents | Result |
|---|---|---|---|---|
| 1 | 2012 | Frontwalker Ladies Open | (Sweden) Christine Hallström (Sweden) Louise Kristersson (Sweden) Isabella Ramsay | Ramsay won with a par on the fourth extra hole. Hallström and Persson eliminated on first extra hole |

== Team appearances ==
Professional

- European Championships (representing Sweden): 2018 (winner – women's team)
