= Drall =

Drall may refer to:

- Amandeep Drall, Indian golfer
- Drall (Star Control species), a fictional alien race in the Star Control franchise
- Drall (Star Wars species), a fictional alien race in the Star Wars franchise
