= Kristianstad Golf Club =

Golf club in Åhus, Sweden

Coordinates: 55.9164°N 14.3687°E

- Location in Sweden

Club information
- Location: Åhus, Kristianstad Municipality, Skåne County, Sweden
- Established: 1924 (SGF Member)
- Type: Public
- Tota holes: 36
- Tournaments: Kristianstad Ladies Open; Creekhouse Ladies Open
- Website: kristianstadsgk.com

Åhus East
- Designed by: Rafael Sundblom; Douglas Braiser
- Par: 72
- Course record: Men: 64 – Per Nyman; Women: 67 – Sarah Nilsson

Åhus West
- Designed by: Rolf Collijn; Tommy Nordström
- Par: 72
- Course record: Men: 63 – Ludwig Nordeklint; Women: 64 – Emma Nilsson

Kristianstad Golf Club is a golf club located in Åhus 18 km southeast of Kristianstad in Skåne County, Sweden. It has hosted the European Ladies Amateur Championship and Kristianstad Ladies Open on the Ladies European Tour.

== History ==
The club was admitted to the Swedish Golf Federation in 1924 as only the 6th club in the country. The first 9-hole course was located at Rinkaby military training ground. It was moved to its current location in Åhus in 1940 and the first 18-hole course, Åhus East, was completed by 1969. The first 9 holes of Åhus West was built in 1980 and its extension to 18 holes was completed in 2006. The Åhus East course saw a major overhaul in 2016 by Pierre Fulke and Adam Mednickson, and Åhus West re-opened with a new layout in 2021. The East course was ranked third best in the country in 2020.

The club has had a vibrant youth section and was a dominant force in ladies golf in Sweden in the 1990s by winning the Swedish Team Championship for women ten years in a row 1992–2001. Amongst the successful players to come out of the club's youth system were LET-players Anna Berg, Mia Löjdahl, Sara Eklund, Sarah Nilsson and Emma Nilsson, 1990 Eisenhower Trophy winner Per Nyman, and 1996 European Amateur champion Daniel Olsson.

The club hosted the Kristianstad Ladies Open on the Ladies European Tour in 1986, where Corinne Dibnah of Australia won by one stroke over Liselotte Neumann. It hosted the Creekhouse Ladies Open on the same tour in 2021, where local players Maja Stark and Linn Grant secured the top two spots. It also hosted the 1999 Swedish Matchplay Championship on the Challenge Tour, the 2017 Tour Final for the Swedish Golf Tour (men and women), and many amateur tournaments such as the 2002 European Ladies Amateur Championship, won by Becky Brewerton.

== Tournaments hosted ==
=== Professional tournaments ===
Year	Tour	Championship	Winner
1986	LET	Kristianstad Ladies Open	(Australia) Corinne Dibnah
1999	CHA	Öhrlings Swedish Matchplay	(Sweden) Kalle Brink
2021	LET	Creekhouse Ladies Open	(Sweden) Maja Stark

=== Amateur tournaments ===
Year	Org.	Championship	Winner
2002	EGA	European Ladies Amateur Championship	(Wales) Becky Brewerton

== See also ==
- List of golf courses in Sweden
