= Krista Bakker =

Finnish professional golfer

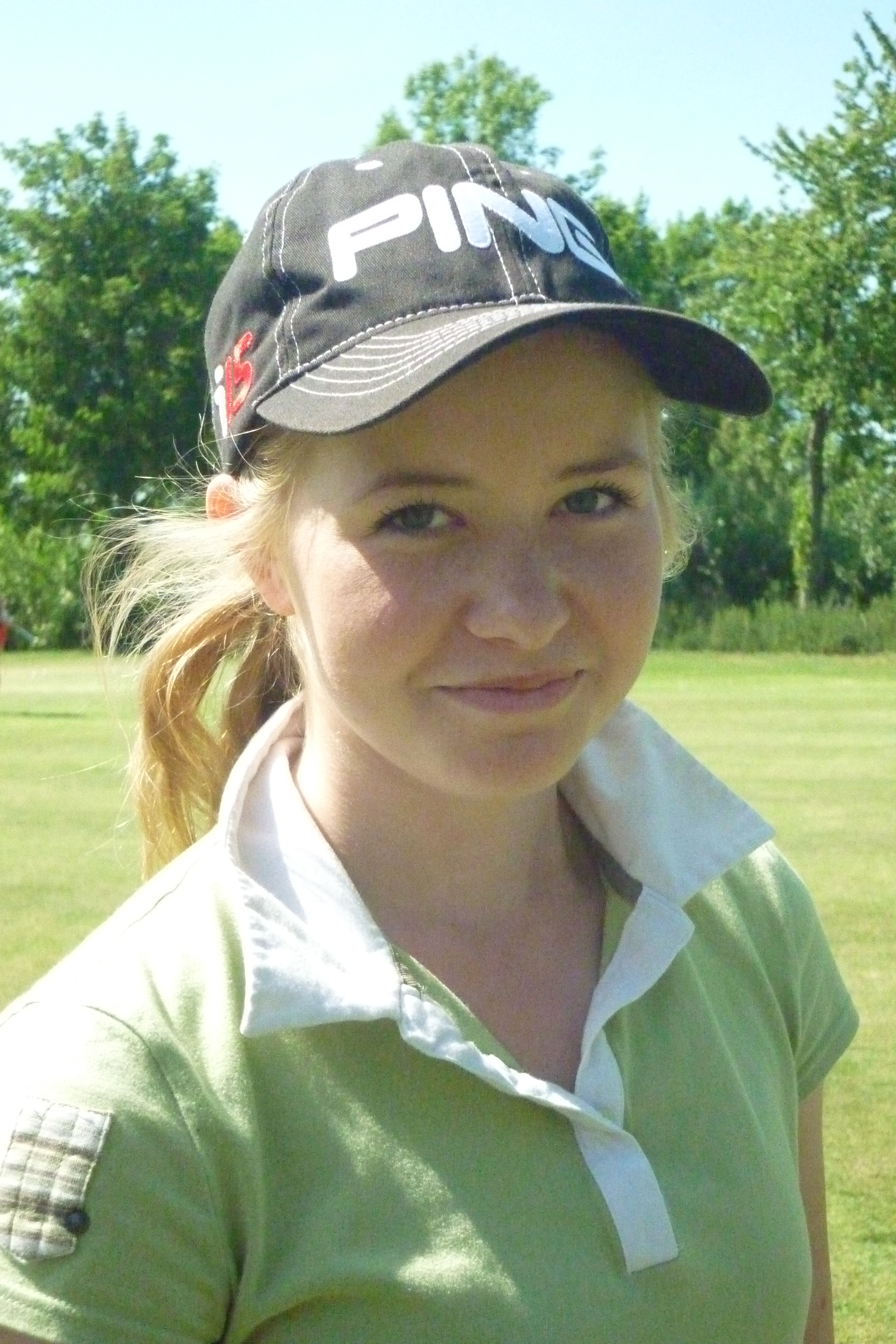
- Bakker in 2011

Personal information
- Nationality: Finland
- Born: 24 December 1993 (age 32) Espoo, Finland
- Height: 5 ft 4 in (163 cm)

Career
- Sport: Golf
- Turned professional: 2014
- Current tour: Ladies European Tour (joined 2014)
- Professional wins: 1

Krista Bakker (born 24 December 1993) is a Finnish professional golfer who plays on the Ladies European Tour (LET). In the Aramco Team Series, she won the 2021 Jeddah team event with Emily Kristine Pedersen and Hannah Burke, and became the first player to win back-to-back in the series when she won the 2022 Bangkok team event with Whitney Hillier and Chonlada Chayanun.

== Career ==
Bakker was born in Espoo, Finland. In 2007, at age 13, she started in the Ladies Finnish Open and in 2011 she made her first LET start at the Dutch Ladies Open. At the 2012 Espirito Santo Trophy in Turkey, she formed the bronze-winning Finnish team together with Sanna Nuutinen and Noora Tamminen.

Bakker turned professional in 2014 after she finished T19 at LET Q-School. She tied for 15th place in her first LET tournament as a professional, the Turkish Airlines Ladies Open, and was tied for 9th in her second start, at the Deloitte Ladies Open.

In 2015, Bakker competed mainly on the LET Access Series, where she won the Creditgate24 Golfseries Hamburg Open and was runner-up at the Norrporten Ladies Open two strikes behind Olivia Cowan, and the Azores Ladies Open, two strokes behind Karolin Lampert. She finished 5th in the LETAS Order of Merit to earn promotion to the LET.

In 2016, Bakker's best result was a tie for 9th at the Lalla Meryem Cup, after which she rose to 410 on the Women's World Golf Rankings. In 2018 and 2019, her best finishes came at the Estrella Damm Ladies Open, in ties for 9th and 10th place respectively.

In 2019, she lost a playoff at the Santander Golf Tour Barcelona to Johanna Gustavsson.

Bakker took the COVID-plagued 2020 season off from tour. When she returned in 2021, she finished in a career best tie for 3rd at the Estrella Damm Ladies Open in October.

In November 2021 Bakker won the Aramco Team Series team event in Jeddah together with Emily Kristine Pedersen and Hannah Burke. The team secured their win after beating a team with Lydia Hall, Becky Brewerton, Luiza Altmann and amateur Victor Green, a former NFL player, after a two-hole playoff. In 2022, she became the first player to record back-to-back victories in the Aramco Team Series, when she won the Bangkok team event by three strokes teamed with Australian Whitney Hillier and local Chonlada Chayanun, whose home club the Thai Country Club hosted the event.

== Professional wins (1) ==
=== LET Access Series (1) ===
| No. | Date | Tournament | Winning score | To par | Margin of victory | Runner-up | Ref |
|---|---|---|---|---|---|---|---|
| 1 | 1 Aug 2015 | CreditGate24 GolfSeries Hamburg Open | 67-70-70=207 | −9 | 3 strokes | (France) Emilie Piquot | |

== Team appearances ==
Amateur

- Espirito Santo Trophy (representing Finland): 2012
