= IOA Invitational =

Golf tournament in Georgia

Tournament information
- Location: Milton, Georgia
- Established: 2018
- Course(s): Atlanta National Golf Club
- Par: 72
- Length: 6,527 yards (5,968 m)
- Tour(s): Symetra Tour
- Format: Stroke play
- Prize fund: $150,000
- Month played: May
- Final year: 2020

Final champion
- (Spain) María Parra

The IOA Invitational was a tournament on the Symetra Tour, the LPGA's developmental tour. It was a part of the Symetra Tour's schedule between 2018 and 2020. It was held at Atlanta National Golf Club in Milton, Georgia.

Elizabeth Szokol was the inaugural champion, and in 2019 María Parra prevailed over Leona Maguire, Ssu-Chia Cheng and Madison Pressel in a five-hole playoff hole for her first Symetra Tour victory.

The tournament in 2020 was cancelled due to the COVID-19 pandemic.

== Winners ==
Year	Date	Winner	Country	Score	Margin of victory	Runner(s)-up	Purse ($)	Winner's share ($)
2020	~~May 7–9~~; Oct 22–24	Tournament cancelled (Note: The tournament was first rescheduled from May 7–9, then cancelled.)					150,000	22,500
2019	May 9–11	María Parra	Spain	210 (−6)	Playoff	(Chinese Taipei) Ssu-Chia Cheng (Republic of Ireland) Leona Maguire (United States) Madison Pressel	150,000	22,500
2018	May 4–6	Elizabeth Szokol	United States	212 (−4)	1 stroke	(Thailand) Pajaree Anannarukarn	150,000	22,500
