= 2015 LET Access Series =

Professional women's golf tour

2015 LET Access Series season
- Duration: April 2015 – October 2015
- Number of official events: 15
- Most wins: (Germany) Olivia Cowan (3)
- Order of Merit winner: (Germany) Olivia Cowan

The 2015 LET Access Series was a series of professional women's golf tournaments held from April through October 2015 across Europe. The LET Access Series is the second-tier women's professional golf tour in Europe and is the official developmental tour of the Ladies European Tour.

== Tournament results ==
The table below shows the 2015 schedule. The numbers in brackets after the winners' names show the number of career wins they had on the LET Access Series up to and including that event.

Dates	Tournament	Location	Prize fund (€)	Winner	WWGR points
16–18 Apr	Open Generali de Dinard	France	30,000	(France) Sophie Giquel-Bettan (2)	2
29 Apr – 1 May	Ribeira Sacra Patrimonio de la Humanidad International Ladies Open	Spain	35,000	(Scotland) Michele Thomson (1)	2
7–9 May	ASGI Ladies Open	Switzerland	30,000	(Germany) Olivia Cowan (1)	2
22–24 May	PGA Halmstad Ladies Open at Haverdal	Sweden	35,000	(Germany) Isi Gabsa (1)	2
29–31 May	Drøbak Ladies Open	Norway	35,000	(Germany) Isi Gabsa (2)	2
11–13 Jun	Open Generali de Strasbourg	France	30,000	(Finland) Oona Vartiainen (1)	2
3–5 Jul	Borås Ladies Open	Sweden	35,000	(Germany) Olivia Cowan (2)	2
16–18 Jul	CitizenGuard LETAS Trophy	Belgium	30,000	(Spain) Natalia Escuriola (am) (1)	2
30 Jul – 1 Aug	Creditgate24 GolfSeries Hamburg Open	Germany	50,000	(Finland) Krista Bakker (1)	2
5–7 Aug	Norrporten Ladies Open	Sweden	35,000	(Germany) Olivia Cowan (3)	2
11–13 Aug	Larvik Ladies Open	Norway	35,000	(Sweden) Johanna Gustavsson (1)	2
20–22 Aug	Sölvesborg Ladies Open hosted by Fanny Sunesson	Sweden	35,000	(France) Ariane Provot (1)	2
28–30 Aug	HLR Golf Academy Open	Finland	35,000	(Netherlands) Anne van Dam (1)	2
2–4 Oct	Azores Ladies Open	Portugal	30,000	(Germany) Karolin Lampert (1)	2
8–10 Oct	WPGA International Challenge	United Kingdom	30,000	(Spain) Natalia Escuriola (am) (2)	2

== Order of Merit rankings ==
The top five players on the LETAS Order of Merit earned LET membership for the 2016 Ladies European Tour. Players finishing in positions 6–20 get to skip the first stage of the qualifying event and automatically progress to the final stage of the Lalla Aicha Tour School.

Rank	Player	Country	Events	Points	Status earned
1	Olivia Cowan	Germany	11	29,486	Promoted to Ladies European Tour
2	Natalia Escuriola	Spain	12	27,972	Promoted to Ladies European Tour
3	Isi Gabsa	Germany	13	25,880	Promoted to Ladies European Tour
4	Johanna Gustavsson	Sweden	15	22,118	Promoted to Ladies European Tour
5	Krista Bakker	Finland	10	20,213	Promoted to Ladies European Tour
6	Oona Vartiainen	Finland	15	19,871	
7	Kym Larratt	England	15	17,936	
8	Michele Thomson	Scotland	15	17,686	
9	Rachel Raastad	Norway	15	14,343	
10	Sanna Nuutinen	Finland	15	12,410	

== See also ==
- 2015 Ladies European Tour
- 2015 in golf
