= 2012 Espirito Santo Trophy =

Tournament information
- Dates: 27–30 September
- Location: Antalya, Turkey; 36.8874°N 30.7075°E
- Courses: Gloria Golf Club (New and Old Courses)
- Organized by: International Golf Federation
- Format: 72 holes stroke play

Statistics
- Par: New: 72; Old: 72
- Length: New: 5,665 yards (5,180 m); Old: 5,670 yards (5,180 m)
- Field: 53 teams 157 players

Champion
- South Korea; Baek Kyu-jung, Kim Hyo-joo, Kim Min-sun
- 563 (−13)
- Location in Turkey

The 2012 Espirito Santo Trophy took place 27–30 September at the Gloria Golf Club, on its New Course and Old Course in Antalya, Turkey.

It was the 25th women's golf World Amateur Team Championship for the Espirito Santo Trophy.

The tournament was a 72-hole stroke play team event. There were a record 53 team entries, each with two or three players.

Each team played two rounds at the New Course and two rounds at the Old Course. The leading teams played the fourth round at the Old Course. The best two scores for each round counted towards the team total.

Team South Korea successfully defended their title from two years ago, winning the Trophy for the third time, with a 13-under-par score of 563, three strokes ahead of silver medalist team Germany. The bronze medal was shared between former champions team Australia and, for the first time on the podium, team Finland, on tied third place one more stroke back.

The individual title went to 15-year-old Lydia Ko, New Zealand, whose score of 14-under-par 274 was a championship record and six strokes ahead of two players who shared second place.

== Teams ==
53 teams entered the event and completed the competition. Each team had three players, except team Bosnia and Herzegovina and team Serbia, which only had two.

Country	Players
Argentina	Delfina Acosta, Manuela Carbajo Re, Maria Olivero
Australia	Brianna Elliott, Whitney Hillier, Minjee Lee
Austria	Marlies Krenn, Anja Purgauer, Sarah Schober
Belgium	Leslie Cloots, Fanny Cnops, Chloé Leurquin
Bosnia and Herzegovina	Lamija Cehajic, Ena Smajic
Brazil	Nathalie Da Silva, Clara Teixeira, Vitoria Teixeira
Canada	Brooke Henderson, Augusta James, Jennifer Kirby
Czech Republic	Lucie Hinnerova, Katerina Ruzickova, Karolina Vlckova
China	Wang Xinying, Shi Yuting, Zhang WeiWei
Chinese Taipei	Chang Yu-hsin, Ssu-Chia Cheng, Hsu Wei-ling
Colombia	Laura Blanco, Luz Alejandra Cangrejo, Maribel Lopez
Denmark	Nicole Broch Larsen, Nanna Koerstz Madsen, Caroline Nistrup
England	Georgia Hall, Charley Hull, Emily Taylor
Estonia	Mari Hutsi, Liis Kuuli, Annika Meos
Finland	Krista Bakker, Sanna Nuutinen, Noora Tamminen
France	Shannon Aubert, Perrine Delacour, Céline Boutier
Germany	Nina Holleder, Karolin Lampert, Sophia Popov
Guam	Tessie Blair, Mary Parsons, Nalathai Vongjalorn
Guatemala	María José Camey, Pilar Echeverria, Lucía Polo
Hong Kong	Tiffany Chan, Mimi Ho, Kitty Tam
Iceland	Gudrun Bjorgvinsdottir, Valdís Þóra Jónsdóttir, Olafia Kristinsdottir
India	Aditi Ashok, Gursimar Badwal, Gurbani Singh
Ireland	Paula Grant, Leona Maguire, Stephanie Meadow
Italy	Bianca Fabrizio, Roberta Liti, Giulia Molinaro
Japan	Kotone Hori, Sakura Kito, Yumi Matsubara
Latvia	Linda Dobele, Krista Puisite, Mara Puisite
Malaysia	Iman Nordin, Aretha Pan, Kelly Tan
Mexico	Marijosse Navarro, Regina Plasencia, Margarita Ramos
Netherlands	Ileen Domela Nieuwenhuis, Charlotte Puts, Anne van Dam
New Zealand	Mun Chin Keh, Lydia Ko, Emily Perry
Norway	Tonje Daffinrud, Marita Engzelius, Nicoline Skaug
Peru	Kiara Hayashida, Lucia Gutierrez, Maria Salinas
Philippines	Dottie Ardina, Chihiro Ikeda, Mia Piccio
Poland	Nastasia Kossacky, Martyna Mierzwa, Kasia Selwent
Portugal	Leonor Bessa, Ana Rita Felix, Susano Ribeiro
Puerto Rico	Patricia Garcia, Kyle Roig, María Fernanda Torres
Russia	Ksenia Eremina, Margarita Kim, Nina Pegova
Scotland	Eilidh Briggs, Laura Murray, Sally Watson
Serbia	Ariana Savic, Milena Savic
Singapore	Sock Hwee Koh, Jo Ee Kok, Amelia Yong
Slovakia	Aneta Abrahamova, Katarida Chovancova, Natalia Heckova
Slovenia	Ana Belac, Ursa Orehek, Katja Pogačar
South Africa	Alana van Greuning, Bertine Strauss, Kim Williams
South Korea	Baek Kyu-jung, Kim Hyo-joo, Kim Min-sun
Spain	Marta Sanz, Camilla Hedberg, Marta Silva Zamora
Sweden	Daniela Holmqvist, Nathalie Månsson, Madelene Sagström
Switzerland	Olivia Birrer, Celia Gimblett, Rachel Rossel
Thailand	Ornnicha Konsunthea, Supamas Sangchan, Sherman Santiwiwattanaphong
Tunisia	Feriel Chahed, Hana El Benna, Ghozlene Saki
Turkey	Yasemin Sari, Sena Ersoy, Elcin Ulu
Ukraine	Yulia Malimon, Maria Pedenko, Valeriia Sapronova
United States	Austin Ernst, Erynne Lee, Lisa McCloskey
Wales	Amy Boulden, Becky Harries, Chloe Williams
Venezuela	Claudia De Antonio, Maria Andreina Merchan, Fabiana Salazar

== Results ==
Place	Country	Score	To par
1st place, gold medalist(s)	South Korea	144-136-141-142=563	−13
2nd place, silver medalist(s)	Germany	144-141-144-137=566	−10
3rd place, bronze medalist(s)	Australia	144-141-142-140=567	−9
3rd place, bronze medalist(s)	Finland	148-139-143-137=567	−9
T5	New Zealand	143-142-141-142=568	−8
T5	Spain	143-143-142-140=568	−8
7	Canada	143-142-142-142=569	−7
8	United States	148-143-137-142=570	−6
9	France	144-143-144-141=572	−4
10	Japan	143-142-145-144=574	−2
11	Italy	151-139-146-141=577	+1
12	Belgium	144-145-149-140=578	+2
T13	England	150-138-146-145=579	+3
T13	Sweden	141-147-148-143=579	+3
T15	Czech Republic	143-146-143-148=580	+4
T15	Denmark	146-147-145-142=580	+4
T15	Ireland	145-146-144-145=580	+4
18	Mexico	149-146-141-145-=581	+5
19	Norway	148-143-148-143=582	+6
20	Puerto Rico	153-145-140-145=583	+7
T21	China	152-144-146-143=585	+9
T21	Latvia	142-148-149-146=585	+9
23	Wales	149-146-147-146=588	+12
24	Argentina	151-148-142-148=589	+13
T25	Hong Kong	151-145-149-145=590	+14
T25	Malaysia	154-145-143-148=590	+14
27	Thailand	149-150-147-145=591	+15
T28	Chinese Taipei	147-152-147-146=592	+16
T28	Netherlands	151-143-150-148=592	+16
T30	Scotland	154-146-147-146=593	+17
T30	Slovenia	146-148-148-151=593	+17
32	Singapore	144-153-149-149=595	+19
33	Colombia	145-154-150-147=596	+20
34	India	156-147-147-149=599	+23
35	South Africa	157-151-145-151=604	+28
T36	Austria	154-145-149-157=605	+29
T36	Iceland	156-146-153-150=605	+29
T36	Russia	149-151-151-154=605	+29
T36	Turkey	155-151-148-151=605	+29
40	Switzerland	154-158-148-148=608	+32
T41	Peru	155-157-150-158=620	+44
T41	Venezuela	160-150-156-154=620	+44
43	Serbia	150-158-160-153=621	+45
T44	Brazil	154-152-159-161=626	+50
T44	Slovakia	158-156-158-154=626	+50
46	Poland	159-158-157-156=630	+54
47	Portugal	151-161-157-162=631	+55
48	Guatemala	158-161-164-161=644	+68
49	Estonia	160-166-167-168=661	+85
50	Guam	170-168-166-169=673	+97
51	Tunisia	173-165-173-167=678	+102
52	Bosnia and Herzegovina	184-181-173-179=717	+141
53	Ukraine	200-204-190-197=791	+215

== Individual leaders ==
There was no official recognition for the lowest individual scores.

Place	Player	Country	Score	To par
1	Lydia Ko	New Zealand	70-69-67-68=274	−14
T2	Krista Bakker	Finland	72-70-69-69=280	−8
T2	Camilla Hedberg	Spain	70-72-70-68=280	−8
T4	Kim Hyo-joo	South Korea	72-67-70-72=281	−7
T4	Lisa McCloskey	United States	70-71-67-73=281	−7
6	Sophia Popov	Germany	72-70-72-68=282	−6
7	Bianca Fabrizio	Italy	74-71-72-67=284	−4
T8	Baek Kyu-jung	South Korea	73-71-71-70=285	−3
T8	Breanna Elliott	Australia	74-70-72-69=285	−3
T8	Kotone Hori	Japan	70-70-74-71=285	−3
T8	Karolin Lampert	Germany	72-71-72-70=285	−3
