= Karolin Lampert =

German professional golfer

Personal information
- Nickname: Karo
- Nationality: Germany
- Born: 20 February 1995 (age 31) Sandhausen, Germany

Career
- Sport: Golf
- Turned professional: 2013
- Current tour: Ladies European Tour (joined 2016)
- Former tour: LET Access Series
- Professional wins: 1

Best results in LPGA major championships
- Chevron Championship: DNP
- Women's PGA C'ship: DNP
- U.S. Women's Open: CUT: 2021
- Women's British Open: T61: 2019
- Evian Championship: CUT: 2018

Karolin Lampert (born 20 February 1995) is a German professional golfer and member of the Ladies European Tour. She was part of the winning team Johanna Gustavsson at the 2022 Aramco Team Series – New York.

== Amateur career ==
Lampert was a member of the National Team from 2008. With the team, she came second in the 2012 Espirito Santo Trophy, the world amateur team golf championship for women. Individually, she was German Girls Champion in 2011 and 2012 and won the 2012 Spanish International Ladies Amateur Championship. She represented Europe at the Junior Solheim Cup in 2013.

== Professional career ==
Lampert turned professional in 2013. Playing on the LET Access Series she missed ten cuts in a row, then turned around her form to win the 2015 Azores Ladies Open in Portugal. She finished in 31st place on the LETAS Order of Merit and earned her Ladies European Tour card for the 2016 season by finishing in 3rd place at the Lalla Aicha Final Qualifying School in Morocco.

On the 2018 Ladies European Tour, she was runner up at the South African Women's Open, two strokes behind Ashleigh Buhai, and lost a playoff to Astrid Vayson de Pradenne at the Jabra Ladies Open, but still earned qualification for the 2018 Evian Championship. She finished 8th in the 2018 LET rankings and 10th on the 2019 LET rankings.

In 2022, she won the team event at the Aramco Team Series – New York together with Johanna Gustavsson and Jessica Karlsson, one stroke ahead of a team captained by Nelly Korda.

== Personal ==
- Lampert's brother, Moritz, has played on the European Tour.

== Amateur wins ==
- 2011 German Girls Open, German Girls Under 16
- 2012 Spanish Ladies Amateur - Copa S.M. La Reina, German Girls Open, German National Amateur

== Professional wins (1) ==
=== LET Access Series wins (1) ===
No.	Date	Tournament	Winning score	Margin of victory	Runner-up
1	4 Oct 2015	Azores Ladies Open	−2 (71-70-73=214)	2 strokes	(Finland) Krista Bakker

== Team appearances ==
Amateur

- European Girls' Team Championship (representing Germany): 2011, 2012
- Junior Vagliano Trophy (representing the Continent of Europe): 2011 (winners)
- Espirito Santo Trophy (representing Germany): 2012
- Vagliano Trophy (representing the Continent of Europe): 2013 (winners)
- European Ladies' Team Championship (representing Germany): 2013
- Junior Solheim Cup (representing Europe): 2013
