= Jenny Haglund =

Swedish professional golfer (born 1993)

Personal information
- Full name: Jenny Haglund
- Nationality: Sweden
- Born: 26 June 1993 (age 33) Karlstad, Sweden
- Height: 1.73 m (5 ft 8 in)

Career
- Sport: Golf
- College: Southern Methodist University
- Turned professional: 2016
- Current tour: Ladies European Tour (joined 2017)
- Former tours: LPGA Tour (joined 2019); Symetra Tour (joined 2018); LET Access Series; Swedish Golf Tour
- Professional wins: 6

Number of wins by tour
- Ladies European Tour: 1
- Epson Tour: 1
- Other: 4

Best results in LPGA major championships
- Chevron Championship: DNP
- Women's PGA C'ship: CUT: 2018
- U.S. Women's Open: CUT: 2019
- Women's British Open: CUT: 2017, 2018, 2019
- Evian Championship: DNP

Achievements and awards
- Swedish Golf Tour Order of Merit: 2016

Jenny Haglund (born 26 June 1993) is a Swedish professional golfer who has played on the Ladies European Tour (LET) and the LPGA Tour.

== Career ==
Haglund played college golf at Southern Methodist University before she graduated with a degree in Sports Management and Communications in 2016 and turned professional on June 2. She won the 2016 Swedish Golf Tour Order of Merit and finished second in the 2016 LET Access Series Order of Merit rankings, earning promotion to the 2017 Ladies European Tour.

In 2018, Haglund joined the Symetra Tour, where she found herself in the lead heading into the final round of her first tournament, the IOA Championship. In February 2018, Haglund won a new Hyundai Genesis G80 after a hole-in-one during the third round of the ISPS Handa Women's Australian Open in Adelaide.

In April 2018, Haglund claimed her first Ladies European Tour title at the 2018 Lalla Meryem Cup in Rabat, Morocco, following a playoff. Having shared a three-way tie for the 72-hole lead with overnight co-leader Sarah Kemp and the 2017 event champion Klára Spilková on three-under-par 285, Haglund took the spoils after blasting a 249-meter drive down the 18th fairway and converting a four-foot putt for birdie. Following the victory, Haglund rose from 276 to 204 in the Women's World Golf Rankings and topped the 2018 Ladies European Tours Order of Merit, five tournaments into the season.

Haglund won the Symetra Classic and received one of the two sponsor invites for the 2018 Women's PGA Championship, but did not make the cut. She finished 12th on the 2018 Symetra Tour official money list, narrowly (by $2,027) missing out on the full exemption to the LPGA Tour awarded the top ten.

She made 19 starts on the 2019 LPGA Tour and made four cuts. On the LET, she finished top-10 at the Fatima Bint Mubarak Ladies Open, Australian Ladies Classic and the Lalla Meryem Cup, ending the season 41st on the Order of Merit.

== Professional wins (6) ==
=== Ladies European Tour wins (1) ===
No.	Date	Tournament	Winning score	To par	Margin of victory	Runner(s)-up	Winner's share (€)
1	2018	Lalla Meryem Cup	75-72-68-70=285	−3	Playoff	(Australia) Sarah Kemp (Czech Republic) Klára Spilková	67,500

=== Symetra Tour wins (1) ===
No.	Date	Tournament	Winning score	To par	Margin of victory	Runner-up	Winner's share ($)
1	2018	Symetra Classic	73-67=140	−4	Playoff	(Philippines) Dottie Ardina	26,250

=== LET Access Series wins (2) ===
No.	Date	Tournament	Winning score	To par	Margin of victory	Runner(s)-up
1	2016	Norrporten Ladies Open^	69-69-68=206	–10	2 strokes	(Austria) Sarah Schober
2	2016	Azores Ladies Open	76-71-64=211	−5	5 strokes	(France) Joyce Chong (France) Astrid Vayson de Pradenne (Hungary) Csilla Lajtai-Rozsa

^Co-sanctioned with the Swedish Golf Tour

=== Swedish Golf Tour wins (3) ===
No.	Date	Tournament	Winning score	To par	Margin of victory	Runner(s)-up
1	2016	Norrporten Ladies Open^	69-69-68=206	–10	2 strokes	(Austria) Sarah Schober
2	2016	Tourfinal Vellinge Open	70-73-80=223	+7	Playoff	(Sweden) Emma Nilsson
3	2017	Säljfast Ladies Open	67-71-69=207	–9	3 strokes	(Sweden) Martina Edberg

^Co-sanctioned with the LET Access Series

== Team appearances ==
Amateur

- European Ladies' Team Championship (representing Sweden): 2014, 2015
