= Frida Gustafsson Spång =

Swedish professional golfer (born 1993)

Personal information
- Nationality: Sweden
- Born: 15 February 1993 (age 33) Gothenburg, Sweden

Career
- Sport: Golf
- College: East Carolina University
- Turned professional: 2017
- Former tours: Ladies European Tour (joined 2017); LET Access Series; Swedish Golf Tour
- Professional wins: 1

Achievements and awards
- Conference USA Freshman of the Year: 2013
- Conference USA Player of the Year: 2013
- The American Player of the Year: 2016
- WGCA All-American: 2016
- Sweden PGA Future Fund Award: 2017

Frida Gustafsson Spång (born 15 February 1993) is a Swedish professional golfer who has played on the Ladies European Tour (LET). She was runner-up at the 2021 Aramco Team Series team event in London.

== Amateur career ==
Spång's early achievements include winning the 2010 Grand Prix des Landes in Biarritz and the 2011 Swedish Girls Championship. She played for the National Team and represented Sweden at the European Girls' Team Championship and the European Ladies' Team Championship, winning silver in 2014 and bronze in 2016.

She also played in The Spirit International Amateur Golf Championship in Trinity, Texas in 2013 with Linnea Johansson, as well as the 2016 Espirito Santo Trophy in Mexico, together with Emma Henrikson and Linnea Ström.

== College career ==
Spång attended East Carolina University from 2012 to 2016. As a freshman, she became the first golfer in Conference USA women's history to be named both the Player and Freshman of the Year in the same season. As a senior, she was named Second-Team All-America by the Women's Golf Coaches Association (WGCA). She set a new single-season record with four tournament wins (UCF Challenge, 3M Augusta Invitational, Briar’s Creek Invitational and the American Championships) and became the all-time leader in wins with seven college career wins. She posted an ECU-best 72.25 seasonal stroke average and was named 2016 American Athletic Conference Women's Golf Player of the Year.

== Professional career ==
Spång turned professional and joined the LET in 2017 after finishing 21st at the Lalla Aicha Q-School. Her best finish in her rookie season was a tie for 7th at the Ladies European Thailand Championship.

Spång was runner-up at the 2017 Swedish PGA Championship, an LET Access Series event, one stroke behind Valentine Derrey. In 2017 she was also runner-up at the Ulricehamn Ladies Open and the Ladies Norwegian Open, both Swedish Golf Tour events. In 2018, she lost a playoff to My Leander at the Nes Open on the same tour, but won a playoff against Lina Boqvist at the Hjo S Open for her maiden professional victory.

On the 2021 Ladies European Tour, she was runner-up at the Aramco Team Series in London teamed with Marianne Skarpnord and Carmen Alonso, three strokes behind the winning team captained by Olivia Cowan.

== Amateur wins ==
- 2008 (2) Patrik Sjöland Junior Open, Skandia Tour Riks #5 - Halland
- 2009 (2) Wendels Junior Open, Johan Edfors Junior Open
- 2010 (2) Chalmers Junior Open, Grand Prix des Landes
- 2011 (1) Swedish Girls Championship
- 2012 (2) UNCG Starmount Fall Classic, Wilson Junior Masters Invitational Open
- 2013 (1) JMU Eagle Landing Invitational
- 2014 (1) Minnesota Invitational
- 2016 (4) UCF Challenge, 3M Augusta Invitational, Briar's Creek Invitational, The American Championship

== Professional wins (1) ==
- 2018 Hjo S Open

== Team appearances ==
Amateur

- European Girls' Team Championship (representing Sweden): 2011
- European Ladies' Team Championship (representing Sweden): 2013, 2014, 2016
- The Spirit International Amateur Golf Championship (representing Sweden): 2013
- Espirito Santo Trophy (representing Sweden): 2016
