= Lina Boqvist =

Swedish professional golfer (born 1991)

Personal information
- Nationality: Sweden
- Born: 25 May 1991 (age 35) Gislaved, Sweden
- Height: 5 ft 9 in (1.75 m)

Career
- Sport: Golf
- Turned professional: 2010
- Former tours: LET (2015–2022); LET Access Series; Swedish Golf Tour (joined 2011)
- Professional wins: 3

Best results in LPGA major championships
- Chevron Championship: DNP
- Women's PGA C'ship: DNP
- U.S. Women's Open: DNP
- Women's British Open: T47: 2016
- Evian Championship: DNP

Achievements and awards
- Swedish Golf Tour Order of Merit: 2013

Lina Boqvist (born 25 May 1991) is a Swedish professional golfer who played on the Ladies European Tour 2015–2022. She was runner-up at the 2019 Lalla Meryem Cup, and won the team event at the 2021 Aramco Team Series – New York together with Jessica Korda and Karolin Lampert.

== Career ==
Boqvist was born in 1991 in Gislaved, Småland, and learned the game at Isaberg Golf Club, home to the Gisvaled Ladies Open on the 1989 Ladies European Tour. As a junior, she collected multiple titles on the Skandia Tour and the Junior Masters Invitational series.

Boqvist turned professional late 2010 ahead of the 2011 season and joined the Swedish Golf Tour, where she won the 2012 Swedish Matchplay Championship 5 and 3. Defending her title in 2013 she lost the final to Anjelika Hammar, but the runner-up finish helped her win the 2013 Swedish Golf Tour Order of Merit.

She joined the 2014 LET Access Series and with a victory in the Onsjö Ladies Open she ended the season runner-up on the Order of Merit, earning a card for the Ladies European Tour in 2015.

=== Ladies European Tour ===
In her rookie season on the LET her best result was a tie for 3rd at Tipsport Golf Masters in the Czech Republic, three strokes behind winner Hannah Burke. She finished 44th on the order of merit.

Boqvist made the cut in her first major appearance. She finished tied 47th in the 2016 Women's British Open at Woburn Golf and Country Club after qualifying by rising to 23rd on the LET money list, helped by a top ten at the Lalla Meryem Cup. She qualified as one of the five reserves for the 2016 Summer Olympics.

Boqvist finished fifth at the 2018 European Golf Team Championships – Mixed team together with Per Längfors, Johan Edfors and Emma Nilsson, two strokes away from the bronze medal playoff.

In 2019 Boqvist was runner-up at the Lalla Meryem Cup. She shot a career low round of 66 and finished the tournament tied for second to Nuria Iturrioz after they started the final round tied at 10-under. She finished the 2019 season 11th on the Order of Merit.

In 2021 she clinched her first LET victory in the team event at the Aramco Team Series – New York, together with Jessica Korda, Karolin Lampert and amateur Alexandra O'Laughlin, a Golf Channel reporter. After starting the day two strokes behind the overnight leaders, the team produced a solid round to finish with a total of 41-under-par, forcing a playoff with the team captained by Sophia Popov.

In 2022, Boqvist rolled in eight birdies, including four consecutively on the final four holes, to take the lead after the first round of the Women's Irish Open, and ultimately finished tied 29th.

She announced her retirement from professional touring at the end of 2022.

== Amateur wins ==
- 2006 (1) Skandia Tour Småland #1
- 2008 (2) Skandia Tour Riks #6 - Skåne, Varberg Junior Open
- 2009 (3) Patrik Sjöland Junior Open, Varberg Junior Open, Skandia Tour Riks #8 - Halland
- 2010 (3) Gräppås Junior Open, Skandia Tour elit flickor #5, Junior Masters Invitational

== Professional wins (3) ==
=== LET Access Series (1) ===
No.	Date	Tournament	Winning score	To par	Margin of victory	Runner-up
1	23 Aug 2014	Onsjö Ladies Open^	72-69-69=210	−6	Playoff	(Sweden) Lynn Carlsson

^Co-sanctioned by the Swedish Golf Tour

=== Swedish Golf Tour (3) ===
No.	Date	Tournament	Winning score	To par	Margin of victory	Runner-up
1	18 Aug 2012	Swedish Matchplay Championship	5&3			(Sweden) Julia Davidsson
1	23 Aug 2014	Onsjö Ladies Open^	72-69-69=210	−6	Playoff	(Sweden) Lynn Carlsson
1	18 Jun 2017	Ulricehamn Ladies Open	67-68-71=206	−10	4 strokes	(Sweden) Frida Gustafsson-Spång

^Co-sanctioned by the LET Access Series

== Results in LPGA majors ==
Tournament	2016	2017	2018	2019	2020
ANA Inspiration					
Women's PGA Championship					
U.S. Women's Open					
Women's British Open	T47	CUT		CUT	CUT
The Evian Championship					NT

Did not play

CUT = missed the half-way cut
NT = no tournament
"T" = tied for place

== Team appearances ==
Professional

- European Championships (representing Sweden): 2018
