= Olivia Cowan =

German professional golfer (born 1996)

Personal information
- Nationality: Germany
- Born: 9 April 1996 (age 30) Homburg, Germany
- Height: 5 ft 9 in (175 cm)

Career
- Sport: Golf
- Turned professional: 2015
- Current tours: Ladies European Tour; LPGA Tour
- Former tour: LET Access Series
- Professional wins: 4

Number of wins by tour
- Ladies European Tour: 1
- Other: 3

Best results in LPGA major championships
- Chevron Championship: T40: 2024
- Women's PGA C'ship: 74th: 2025
- U.S. Women's Open: CUT: 2016
- Women's British Open: T9: 2023
- Evian Championship: T50: 2022

Achievements and awards
- LET Access Series Order of Merit: 2015

Olivia Cowan (born 9 April 1996) is a German professional golfer and member of the Ladies European Tour. She won the 2022 Hero Women's Indian Open and captained the winning team at the 2021 at the Aramco Team Series – London.

== Personal life ==
Cowan's father, Andrew, is an English-born teaching professional in Germany. He taught her golf from the age of three.

== Amateur career ==
As an amateur, Cowan played for the German National Team from 2011 to 2015. She won the 2010 U14 German Girls' National Championship, the 2011 Luxembourg Ladies International Amateur Championship, the 2013 German Ladies National Championship, and in 2015 both the Portuguese International Ladies Amateur Championship and the Spanish International Ladies Amateur Championship, the Copa de S.M. la Reina.

Cowan represented Germany at the 2014 Summer Youth Olympics in China and finished fourth. She was a member of the winning European Vagliano Trophy Team in 2015. She turned professional in July 2015 with a handicap of +4, ranked seventh in the World Amateur Golf Ranking.

== Professional career ==
Cowan won three times on the 2015 LET Access Series. First the ASGI Ladies Open in Switzerland and the Borås Ladies Open in Sweden while still an amateur. Then, after turning professional in July, she collected her third win at the Norrporten Ladies Open in Sweden in August. Her other notable LETAS finishes include runner-up at the CreditGate24 Trophy in Germany and the Citizenguard Trophy in Belgium. She also received invitations to play on the 2015 Ladies European Tour in the Helsingborg Open in Sweden, where she finished T12, and the Omega Dubai Ladies Masters, where she missed the cut. Cowan qualified for the Ladies European Tour after winning the 2015 LET Access Series Order of Merit.

She qualified for her first major championship, the 2016 U.S. Women's Open, at the Buckinghamshire sectional qualifying tournament in England.

On the 2016 Ladies European Tour, her rookie season on the LET, Cowan recorded three top-10 finishes including a best finish of fifth in the Sanya Ladies Open. The following year she recorded two top-10 finishes, which were T6 in the Fatima Bint Mubarak Ladies Open and T9 in the Omega Dubai Ladies Classic. In 2018 she finished seventh on the LET Order of Merit, after recording four top-10 finishes in 12 events, including a best finish of T4 in the Andalucia Costa Del Sol Open De España. She also started four events and made three cuts on the 2018 Symetra Tour, recording a top finish of T7 at the IOA Championship.

On the 2019 Ladies European Tour, Cowan again ended seventh on the Order of Merit, for the second year in a row, after posting seven top-10 finishes in 16 starts. She also recorded a career best finish of T2 in the Omega Dubai Moonlight Classic, one stroke behind Nuria Iturrios.

In July 2021, Cowan earned her first win on the Ladies European Tour, a team win at the Aramco Team Series – London with Sarina Schmidt, Diksha Dagar and amateur Andrew Kelsey.

Cowan earned her card for the 2022 LPGA Tour through qualifying school.

In October 2022, Cowan won the Hero Women's Indian Open at the DLF Golf and Country Club to claim her maiden LET win in her 96th event. She shot a 13-under 275 to win by three shots over Amandeep Drall and Caroline Hedwall.

== Amateur wins ==
- 2010 U14 German Girls' National Championship
- 2011 Luxembourg Ladies International Amateur Championship
- 2013 German Ladies National Championship
- 2015 Spanish International Ladies Amateur Championship, Portuguese International Ladies Amateur Championship

== Professional wins (4) ==
=== Ladies European Tour wins (1) ===
| No. | Date | Tournament | Winning score | Margin of victory | Runners-up |
|---|---|---|---|---|---|
| 1 | 23 Oct 2022 | Hero Women's Indian Open | −13 (71-71-65-68=275) | 3 strokes | (India) Amandeep Drall (Sweden) Caroline Hedwall |

=== LET Access Series wins (3) ===
| No. | Date | Tournament | Winning score | Margin of victory | Runner(s)-up |
|---|---|---|---|---|---|
| 1 | 9 May 2015 | ASGI Ladies Open | −9 (71-67-69=207) | 3 strokes | (Malaysia) Ainil Johani Bakar (Switzerland) Azelia Meichtry |
| 2 | 5 Jul 2015 | Borås Ladies Open | −7 (68-69-7=209) | 1 stroke | (Finland) Oona Vartiainen |
| 3 | 7 Aug 2015 | Norrporten Ladies Open | −7 (73-69-67=209) | 2 strokes | (Finland) Krista Bakker |

== Results in LPGA majors ==
Results generally not in chronological order.

| Tournament | 2016 | 2017 | 2018 | 2019 | 2020 | 2021 | 2022 | 2023 | 2024 | 2025 | 2026 |
|---|---|---|---|---|---|---|---|---|---|---|---|
| Chevron Championship | | | | | | | | | T40 | | |
| U.S. Women's Open | CUT | | | | | | | | | | |
| Women's PGA Championship | | | | | | | | | CUT | 74 | CUT |
| The Evian Championship | | | | | NT | T70 | T50 | | CUT | | |
| Women's British Open | | CUT | CUT | T29 | CUT | CUT | CUT | T9 | CUT | CUT | |

Top 10
Did not play

CUT = missed the half-way cut
NT = no tournament
T = tied

=== Summary ===
| Tournament | Wins | 2nd | 3rd | Top-5 | Top-10 | Top-25 | Events | Cuts made |
|---|---|---|---|---|---|---|---|---|
| Chevron Championship | 0 | 0 | 0 | 0 | 0 | 0 | 1 | 1 |
| U.S. Women's Open | 0 | 0 | 0 | 0 | 0 | 0 | 1 | 0 |
| Women's PGA Championship | 0 | 0 | 0 | 0 | 0 | 0 | 3 | 1 |
| The Evian Championship | 0 | 0 | 0 | 0 | 0 | 0 | 3 | 2 |
| Women's British Open | 0 | 0 | 0 | 0 | 1 | 1 | 9 | 2 |
| Totals | 0 | 0 | 0 | 0 | 1 | 1 | 17 | 6 |

- Most consecutive cuts made – 2 (2023 Women's British Open – 2024 Chevron Championship)
- Longest streak of top-10s – 1 (once)

== Team appearances ==
Amateur

- Espirito Santo Trophy (representing Germany): 2014
- European Ladies' Team Championship (representing Germany): 2014, 2015
- Vagliano Trophy (representing Continent of Europe): 2015 (winners)

Professional

- European Championships (representing Germany): 2018
