= Lalla Meryem Cup =

Golf tournament

Tournament information
- Location: Rabat, Morocco
- Established: 1993
- Course: Royal Golf Dar Es Salam
- Par: 72
- Tour: Ladies European Tour
- Format: stroke play
- Prize fund: €450,000
- Month played: May

Current champion
- (Canada) Anna Huang

Final champion
- Location in Morocco Location in Europe

The Lalla Meryem Cup is a women's professional golf tournament in Morocco under the high patronage of His Majesty King Mohammed VI. It was held in Rabat until it moved to Agadir in 2011. It moved back to Rabat in 2016.

The tournament has been played annually since 1993 and is held alongside the Hassan II Golf Trophy. In 2010 it was added to the Ladies European Tour schedule and upgraded to a full field tournament having previously been limited to around 12 players.

== Winners ==
Year	Player	Country	Score	To par	Margin of victory	Runner(s)-up	Purse (€)	Ref.
2026	Anna Huang	Canada	70-69-66=205	−14	1 stroke	(Australia) Kelsey Bennett	450,000	
2025	Cara Gainer	England	71-70-69=216	−9	Playoff	(India) Diksha Dagar	450,000	
2024	Bronte Law	England	73-69-64=206	−13	3 strokes	(France) Pauline Roussin	450,000	
2023	Maja Stark	Sweden	71-67-69=207	−12	4 strokes	(Sweden) Linn Grant	450,000	
2020–2022: No tournament								
2019	Nuria Iturrioz	Spain	68-71-70-70=279	−13	7 strokes	(Sweden) Lina Boqvist (Sweden) Caroline Hedwall	450,000	
2018	Jenny Haglund	Sweden	75-72-68-70=285	−3	Playoff	(Australia) Sarah Kemp (Czech Republic) Klára Spilková	450,000	
2017	Klára Spilková	Czech Republic	69-74-71-66=280	−8	1 stroke	(Norway) Suzann Pettersen	450,000	
2016	Nuria Iturrioz	Spain	70-72-70-65=277	−11	6 strokes	(England) Florentyna Parker	450,000	
2015	Gwladys Nocera	France	68-65-68-70=271	−13	2 strokes	(South Africa) Nicole Garcia	450,000	
2014	Charley Hull	England	68-71-68-62=269	−15	Playoff	(France) Gwladys Nocera	450,000	
2013	Ariya Jutanugarn	Thailand	69-67-67-67=270	−14	3 strokes	(United States) Beth Allen	325,000	
2012	Karen Lunn	Australia	72-66-68-66=272	−12	3 strokes	(South Africa) Tandi Cuningham	325,000	
2011	Zuzana Kamasova	Slovakia	71-68-71-76=286	−2	2 strokes	(England) Kiran Matharu	325,000	
2010	Anja Monke	Germany	71-68-69=208	−8	1 stroke	(Sweden) Carin Koch	275,000	

Prior to Ladies European Tour co-sanctioning

Year	Winner	Country	Note
2009	No tournament		
2008	Laura Davies	England	
2007	Gwladys Nocera	France	
2006	Sophie Sandolo	Italy	
2005	Ana Belén Sánchez	Spain	
2004	No tournament		
2003	Johanna Head	England	
2002	Johanna Head	England	
2001	Marine Monnet	France	
2000	Elisabeth Esterl	Germany	
1999	Lora Fairclough	England	
1998	Sophie Gustafson	Sweden	
1997	Diane Barnard	England	
1996	Lora Fairclough	England	
1995	Amaia Arruti	Spain	
1994	Gillian Stewart	England	
1993	Marie-Laure de Lorenzi	France	
