= Esther Henseleit =

German professional golfer (born 1999)

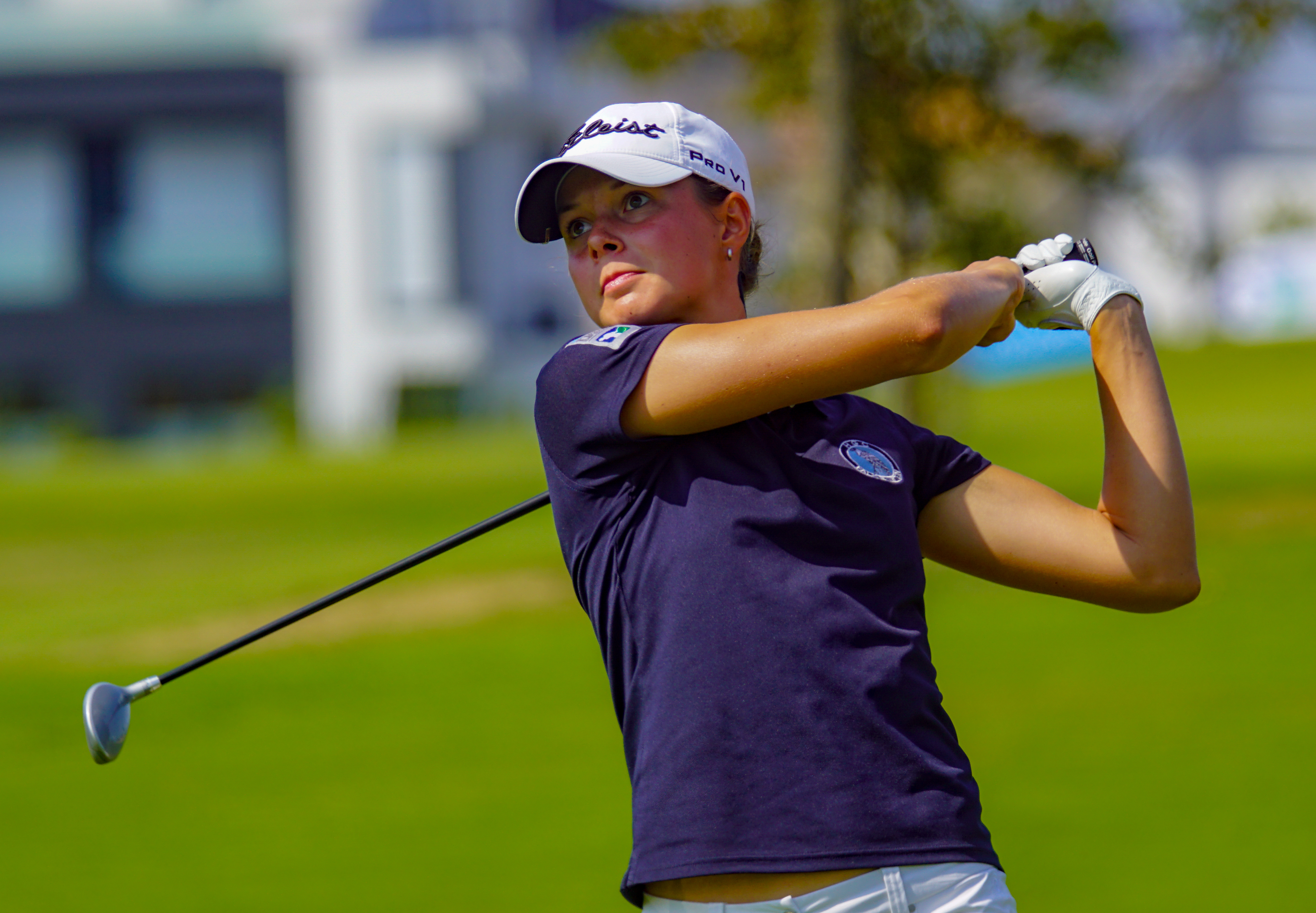
- Henseleit in August 2018

Personal information
- Nationality: Germany
- Born: 14 January 1999 (age 27) Varel, Germany
- Height: 5 ft 10 in (178 cm)

Career
- Sport: Golf
- Turned professional: 2019
- Current tours: Ladies European Tour (joined 2019); LPGA Tour (joined 2020)
- Professional wins: 3

Number of wins by tour
- Ladies European Tour: 2
- Other: 1

Best results in LPGA major championships
- Chevron Championship: 7th: 2024
- Women's PGA C'ship: T12: 2025
- U.S. Women's Open: T22: 2025
- Women's British Open: 2nd: 2026
- Evian Championship: T7: 2024

Achievements and awards
- Ladies European Tour Order of Merit: 2019
- Ladies European Tour Rookie of the Year: 2019
Medal record
Women's golf
Representing Germany
Olympic Games
Silver medal – second place	2024 Paris	Individual

Esther Henseleit (born 14 January 1999) is a German professional golfer and member of the Ladies European Tour and LPGA Tour. She won the silver medal at the 2024 Summer Olympics in Paris.

== Amateur career ==
Henseleit attended Freie Waldorfschule Oldenburg and played for Golfclub am Meer before switching to Hamburg Golf Club in 2013. She joined the German national team in 2014 and finished third at the 2016 International Amateur Championship. In 2017 she was selected for the Junior Solheim Cup and in 2018 she was runner-up at the European Ladies Amateur Championship, one stroke behind Celia Barquín. She won the 2018 German National Amateur and the German Team Amateur Championship as well as the European Ladies' Club Trophy with Hamburg GC.

== Professional career ==
Henseleit turned professional in January 2019 (with an EGA handicap of +7.1) after finishing third at Qualifying School for the 2019 Ladies European Tour. She won the Skaftö Open on the LET Access Series and qualified for the 2019 U.S. Women's Open at a sectional qualifying tournament.

Henseleit finished second at four LET tournaments, the Omega Dubai Moonlight Classic, La Reserva de Sotogrande Invitational, Ladies European Thailand Championship and the Estrella Damm Mediterranean Ladies Open, one stroke behind Carlota Ciganda. In December, with her maiden LET win at the Magical Kenya Ladies Open, she secured both LET Order of Merit and LET Rookie of the Year, becoming only the third player after Laura Davies in 1985 and Carlota Ciganda in 2012 to manage this feat.

In November 2019, Henseleit gained 2020 LPGA Tour membership through Q-Series.

In February 2022, she successfully defended her title at the Magical Kenya Ladies Open.

== Amateur wins ==
- 2014 German National Girls Championship
- 2018 German National Amateur, European Ladies' Club Trophy

== Professional wins (3) ==
=== Ladies European Tour wins (2) ===
No.	Date	Tournament	Winning score	To par	Margin of victory	Runner-up
1	8 Dec 2019	Magical Kenya Ladies Open	69-70-71-64=274	−14	1 stroke	(India) Aditi Ashok
2	13 Feb 2022	Magical Kenya Ladies Open	74-73-69-70=286	−2	1 stroke	(Spain) Marta Sanz Barrio

Ladies European Tour playoff record (0–2)

No.	Year	Tournament	Opponent	Result
1	2023	ISPS Handa World Invitational	(United States) Alexa Pano (England) Gabriella Cowley	Pano won with birdie on third extra hole Henseleit eliminated by birdie on first hole
2	2026	AIG Women's Open	(Japan) Shiho Kuwaki	Lost to par on second extra hole

=== LET Access Series (1) ===
No.	Date	Tournament	Winning score	To par	Margin of victory	Runner-up
1	15 Jun 2019	Skaftö Open	64-68-64=196	−11	1 stroke	(Sweden) Lynn Carlsson

== Results in LPGA majors ==
Results not in chronological order.

Tournament	2019	2020	2021	2022	2023	2024	2025	2026
Chevron Championship		T51		CUT	CUT	7	T18	CUT
U.S. Women's Open	T30	CUT				T51	T22	T49
Women's PGA Championship		CUT	T15	CUT	T30	T14	T12	T15
The Evian Championship	CUT	NT	T60	T27	T14	T7	T49	CUT
Women's British Open	CUT	CUT	CUT	T54	CUT	T37	T23	2

Top 10
Did not play

CUT = missed the half-way cut
NT = no tournament
T = tied

=== Summary ===
Tournament	Wins	2nd	3rd	Top-5	Top-10	Top-25	Events	Cuts made
Chevron Championship	0	0	0	0	1	2	6	3
U.S. Women's Open	0	0	0	0	0	1	5	4
Women's PGA Championship	0	0	0	0	0	4	7	5
The Evian Championship	0	0	0	0	1	2	7	5
Women's British Open	0	1	0	1	1	2	8	4
Totals	0	1	0	1	3	11	33	21

- Most consecutive cuts made – 10 (2024 Chevron – 2025 British Open)
- Longest streak of top-10s – 1 (three times, current)

== LPGA Tour career summary ==
Year	Tournaments played	Cuts made*	Wins	2nd	3rd	Top 10s	Best finish	Earnings ($)	Money list rank	Scoring average	Scoring rank
2020	9	3	0	0	0	0	T51	17,705	134	73.57	124
2021	19	14	0	0	0	4	4	435,029	48	70.48	27
2022	25	12	0	0	1	1	T3	224,053	88	71.81	94
2023	23	16	0	1	1	2	T2	614,362	45	70.95	44
2024	24	19	0	1	0	4	2	1,079,209	30	71.15	45
2025	21	19	0	1	1	2	T2	1,189,186	33	70.72	36
Totals^	121	83	0	3	3	13	2	3,559,544	141		

^ Official as of 2025 season
*Includes matchplay and other tournaments without a cut.

== Team appearances ==
Amateur

- European Girls' Team Championship (representing Germany): 2014, 2015, 2017
- European Ladies' Team Championship (representing Germany): 2016, 2018
- Espirito Santo Trophy (representing Germany): 2016, 2018
- Junior Solheim Cup (representing Europe): 2017

Professional

- Solheim Cup (representing Europe): 2024, 2026 (winners)

=== Solheim Cup record ===
Year	Total matches	Total W–L–H	Singles W–L–H	Foursomes W–L–H	Fourballs W–L–H	Points won	Points %
Career	6	3–2–1	0–1–1	3–1–0	0–0–0	3.5	58.3
2024	3	1–1–1	0–0–1 tied w/ An. Lee	1–1–0 lost w/ C. Hull 3&2 won w/ C. Hull 1 up	0–0–0	1.5	50.0
2026	3	2–1–0	0–1–0 lost to Al. Lee 1 dn	2–0–0 won w/ L. Maguire 2 up won w/ L. Maguire 1 up	0–0–0	2	66.7
