= 2019 Ladies European Tour =

Professional women's golf tour

2019 Ladies European Tour season
- Duration: January 2019 – December 2019
- Number of official events: 21
- Most wins: 2 (tie): (Netherlands) Anne van Dam (Spain) Nuria Iturrioz
- Order of Merit: (Germany) Esther Henseleit
- Player of the Year: (Norway) Marianne Skarpnord
- Rookie of the Year: (Germany) Esther Henseleit
- Lowest stroke average: (Spain) Carlota Ciganda

The 2019 Ladies European Tour was a series of golf tournaments for elite female golfers from around the world, played from 10 January to 8 December 2019. The tournaments were sanctioned by the Ladies European Tour (LET).

== Schedule ==
The table below shows the 2019 schedule. The numbers in brackets after the winners' names indicate the career wins on the Ladies European Tour, including that event, and is only shown for members of the tour.

Key

Major championships
Regular events
Team championships

Date	Tournament	Location	Winner (Note: (a) – Amateur)	WWGR points	Purse	Other tours (Note: ALPG − ALPG Tour, LETAS − LET Access Series, LPGA − LPGA Tour, SLT − Sunshine Ladies Tour, CHA − Challenge Tour, EST − European Senior Tour.)	Notes
12 Jan	Fatima Bint Mubarak Ladies Open	United Arab Emirates	(England) Charley Hull (2)	12	$300,000		
24 Feb	Australian Ladies Classic	Australia	(Norway) Marianne Skarpnord (4)	10	€240,000	ALPG	
3 Mar	ActewAGL Canberra Classic	Australia	(Netherlands) Anne van Dam (4)	10	A$150,000	ALPG	
10 Mar	Women's NSW Open	Australia	(England) Meghan MacLaren (2)	6	A$150,000	ALPG	
16 Mar	Investec South African Women's Open	South Africa	(India) Diksha Dagar (1)	6	R 2,000,000	SLT	
6 Apr	Jordan Mixed Open	Jordan	(England) Meghan MacLaren (n/c) low woman	–	$393,000	CHA, EST	Limited field event (Note: Points earned towards the Order of Merit based only on other golfers from the Ladies European Tour.)
28 Apr	Lalla Meryem Cup	Morocco	(Spain) Nuria Iturrioz (2)	6	€450,000		
3 May	Omega Dubai Moonlight Classic	United Arab Emirates	(Spain) Nuria Iturrioz (3)	6	$285,000		
19 May	La Reserva de Sotogrande Invitational	Spain	(France) Céline Herbin (2)	6	€300,000		
26 May	Jabra Ladies Open	France	(England) Annabel Dimmock (1)	6	€150,000	LETAS	
23 Jun	Ladies European Thailand Championship	Thailand	(Thailand) Atthaya Thitikul (2, a)	6	€300,000		
28 Jul	Evian Championship	France	(South Korea) Ko Jin-young (n/a)	100	$4,100,000	LPGA	
4 Aug	AIG Women's British Open	England	(Japan) Hinako Shibuno (1)	100	$4,500,000	LPGA	
11 Aug	Aberdeen Standard Investments Ladies Scottish Open	Scotland	(South Korea) M. J. Hur (n/a)	31	$1,500,000	LPGA	
25 Aug	Tipsport Czech Ladies Open	Czech Republic	(Scotland) Carly Booth (3)	6	€120,000	LETAS	
22 Sep	Lacoste Ladies Open de France	France	(United States) Nelly Korda (n/a)	14	€325,000		
29 Sep	Estrella Damm Mediterranean Ladies Open	Spain	(Spain) Carlota Ciganda (4)	8	€300,000		
6 Oct	Hero Women's Indian Open	India	(Austria) Christine Wolf (1)	6	$500,000		
1 Dec	Andalucia Costa Del Sol Open De España Femenino	Spain	(Netherlands) Anne van Dam (5)	10	€300,000		
8 Dec	Magical Kenya Ladies Open	Kenya	(Germany) Esther Henseleit (1)	6	€300,000		

=== Unofficial events ===
The following events appeared on the schedule, but did not carry ranking points.

Date	Tournament	Host country	Winners	WWGR points	Purse	Other tours	Notes
15 Sep	The Solheim Cup	Scotland	Europe	–	–	LPGA	

== Order of Merit rankings ==
Rank	Player	Country	Points
1	Esther Henseleit	Germany	743.06
2	Marianne Skarpnord	Norway	694.44
3	Christine Wolf	Austria	536.65
4	Nuria Iturrioz	Spain	510.95
5	Meghan MacLaren	England	454.40
6	Caroline Hedwall	Sweden	415.42
7	Olivia Cowan	Germany	399.23
8	Anne van Dam	Netherlands	392.12
9	Laura Fünfstück	Germany	339.25
10	Karolin Lampert	Germany	284.48

== Location of tournaments ==
Location of tournaments in Europe.
Major championship
National open
Regular event
Solheim Cup
Location of tournaments outside Europe.
National open
Regular event

== See also ==
- 2019 LPGA Tour
- 2019 LET Access Series
