= Natalia Escuriola =

Spanish professional golfer (born 1994)

Natalia Escuriola Martinez
Personal information
- Nationality: Spain
- Born: 1 August 1994 (age 32)

Career
- Sport: Golf
- Turned professional: 2015
- Current tour: LET Access Series (joined 2015)
- Former tour: Ladies European Tour (joined 2016)
- Professional wins: 8

Achievements and awards
- Santander Golf Tour Order of Merit: 2018, 2019, 2022
Medal record
Mediterranean Games
| Gold medal – first place | 2018 Tarragona | Women's team |

Natalia Escuriola Martinez (born 1 August 1994) is a professional golfer from Spain. She won the 2013 European Ladies' Team Championship and has played on the Ladies European Tour.

== Amateur career ==
Escuriola was born in Castellón de la Plana in 1994 and was introduced to golf at age five. She had a successful amateur career and won the 2014 Campeonato de Espana Intercubes. In 2015, she won the Campeonato de Alicante and the Campeonato de Madrid, ahead of Nuria Iturrios. She was also runner-up at the 2013 Spanish International Stroke Play behind Luna Sobrón. In 2014, she was runner-up at the Copa Andalucia behind Nuria Iturrios, and runner-up at the same event again in 2015, this time behind María Parra Luque. In 2014, she finished third at the Portuguese International Ladies Amateur Championship.

As part of the National Team, Escuriola represented Spain at the European Girls' Team Championship and the European Ladies' Team Championship, winning the event in 2013. She represented Europe in the 2013 Vagliano Trophy.

== Professional career ==
Escuriola joined the LET Access Series in 2015 and started the season as an amateur, opting to turn pro in September ahead of the last two tournaments of the season. She had two victories, the first in the CitizenGuard LETAS Trophy in Belgium while still an amateur, and her second in the season finale, the WPGA International Challenge in England, after she turned professional. She finished in the top-3 in four other tournaments and finished second in the LETAS Order of Merit, earning a full card for the 2016 Ladies European Tour season.

In 2016, her rookie year on the LET, Escuriola played in 11 tournaments and made two cuts. In 2017, her best finish was 5th at the Andalucia Costa Del Sol Open De España, six strokes behind winner Azahara Muñoz. In 2018, she finished tied 4th at the same event.

She won gold at the 2018 Mediterranean Games in the women's team event with Marta Sanz and Patricia Sanz.

Escuriola also play on the Santander Golf Tour in her native Spain, where she has won several tournaments, and also the season ranking in 2018, 2019 and 2022.

== Amateur wins ==
- 2014 Campeonato de Espana Intercubes
- 2015 Campeonato de Madrid, Campeonato de Alicante

== Professional wins (8) ==
=== LET Access Series wins (2) ===
| No. | Date | Tournament | Winning score | To par | Margin of victory | Runner-up | Ref |
|---|---|---|---|---|---|---|---|
| 1 | 18 Jul 2015 | CitizenGuard LETAS Trophy (as an amateur) | 68-69-68=205 | –11 | 2 strokes | (Germany) Olivia Cowan | |
| 2 | 10 Oct 2015 | WPGA International Challenge | 68-67-73=208 | –8 | 2 strokes | (Norway) Rachel Raastad | |

=== Santander Golf Tour wins (5) ===
| No. | Date | Tournament | Winning score | To par | Margin of victory | Runner(s)-up | Ref |
|---|---|---|---|---|---|---|---|
| 1 | 5 Sep 2018 | Santander Golf Tour Sevilla (with Natasha Fear) | 71-64=135 | –7 | 3 strokes | (Spain) Camilla Hedberg & (Spain) Andrea Jonama | |
| 2 | 29 Mar 2019 | Santander Golf Tour Cáceres | 69-73=142 | –2 | 4 strokes | (Spain) María Hernández | |
| 3 | 8 Jul 2022 | Santander Golf Tour Valencia | 76-67=143 | –1 | 1 stroke | (Spain) Piti Martinez Bernal | |
| 4 | 14 Jul 2022 | Santander Golf Tour Vizcaya | 69-72=141 | –3 | Playoff | (Spain) Camilla Hedberg | |
| 5 | 11 Nov 2022 | Santander Golf Tour Girona (with Piti Martinez Bernal) | 64-66=130 | –12 | 1 stroke | (Spain) Mireia Prat & (Spain) María Laura Elvira | |

=== Other wins (1) ===
- 2015 Disa Campeonato de España

== Team appearances ==
Amateur

- European Girls' Team Championship (representing Spain): 2011, 2012
- European Ladies' Team Championship (representing Spain): 2013 (winners), 2014, 2015
- Vagliano Trophy (representing the Continent of Europe): 2013 (winners)

Professional

- Mediterranean Games (representing Spain): 2018 (winners)
