= Women's Indian Open =

Coordinates: 28.455°N 77.106°E

Hero Women's Indian Open

Tournament information
- Location: Gurgaon, India
- Established: 2007
- Course: DLF Golf and Country Club
- Par: 72
- Tours: Ladies European Tour (since 2010); Ladies Asian Golf Tour (until 2021)
- Format: Stroke play
- Prize fund: US$500,000
- Month played: October

Tournament record score
- Aggregate: 203 Pornanong Phatlum (2012)
- To par: −13 as above

Current champion
- (Thailand) Pornanong Phatlum

Location in India

The Hero Women's Indian Open (named after sponsor Hero) is a golf tournament on the Ladies European Tour. It is played at the DLF Golf and Country Club in Gurgaon, India.

Tournament name through the years:

- 2007–2009: DLF Women's Indian Open
- 2010: Hero Honda Women's Indian Open
- 2011–present: Hero Women's Indian Open

== Winners ==
Year	Course	Location	Winner	Country	To par	Score	Margin of victory	Runner(s)-up	Ref
2026	DLF G&CC	Gurgaon	Pornanong Phatlum	Thailand	−15	68-70-69-66=273	1 stroke	(India) Vani Kapoor	
2025	DLF G&CC	Gurgaon	Shannon Tan	Singapore	−7	68-73-73-67=281	1 stroke	(England) Alice Hewson	
2024	DLF G&CC	Gurgaon	Liz Young	England	−2	74-73-67-72=286	1 stroke	(Belgium) Manon De Roey (New Zealand) Momoka Kobori (France) Agathe Sauzon (Singapore) Shannon Tan	
2023	DLF G&CC	Gurgaon	Aline Krauter	Germany	−15	69-68-68-68=273	5 strokes	(Sweden) Sara Kjellker	
2022	DLF G&CC	Gurgaon	Olivia Cowan	Germany	−13	71-71-65-68=275	3 strokes	(India) Amandeep Drall (Sweden) Caroline Hedwall	
2021	DLF G&CC	Gurgaon	Cancelled due to the COVID-19 pandemic						
2020	DLF G&CC	Gurgaon	Cancelled due to the COVID-19 pandemic						
2019	DLF G&CC	Gurgaon	Christine Wolf	Austria	−11	73-68-67-69=277	3 strokes	(Norway) Marianne Skarpnord	
2018	DLF G&CC	Gurgaon	Becky Morgan	Wales	−7	72-72-68-69=281	2 strokes	(Sweden) Caroline Hedwall (England) Felicity Johnson (Denmark) Nicole Broch Larsen (Austria) Christine Wolf	
2017	DLF G&CC	Gurgaon	Camille Chevalier	France	−12	68-69-67=204	1 stroke	(Scotland) Michele Thomson	
2016	DLF G&CC	Gurgaon	Aditi Ashok	India	−3	72-69-72=213	1 stroke	(United States) Brittany Lincicome (Spain) Belén Mozo	
2015	DLF G&CC	Gurgaon	Emily Kristine Pedersen	Denmark	E	70-73-73=216	1 stroke	(Denmark) Malene Jørgensen (Wales) Becky Morgan (United States) Cheyenne Woods	
2014	Delhi GC	New Delhi	Gwladys Nocera	France	−11	64-72-72=208	5 strokes	(England) Hannah Burke (Switzerland) Fabienne In-Albon (South Korea) Hyeon Seo Kang	
2013	Delhi GC	New Delhi	Thidapa Suwannapura	Thailand	−8	66-74-68=208	3 strokes	(France) Valentine Derrey	
2012	DLF G&CC	Gurgaon	Pornanong Phatlum	Thailand	−13	72-65-66=203	4 strokes	(Sweden) Caroline Hedwall	
2011	DLF G&CC	Gurgaon	Caroline Hedwall	Sweden	−12	67-68-69=204	2 strokes	(Thailand) Pornanong Phatlum	
2010	DLF G&CC	Gurgaon	Laura Davies	England	−3	65-78-70=213	Playoff	(South Africa) Tandi Cuningham (Sweden) Louise Friberg (Thailand) Nontaya Srisawang	
2009	DLF G&CC	Gurgaon	Pornanong Phatlum	Thailand	−8	208	2 strokes	(South Korea) Hae-jung Kim	
2008	DLF G&CC	Gurgaon	Pornanong Phatlum	Thailand	−4	212	4 strokes	(Taiwan) Wei Jun-jye (Japan) Yuki Sakurai	
2007	DLF G&CC	Gurgaon	Yani Tseng	Taiwan	−1	215	Playoff	(Thailand) Russamee Gulyanamitta	
