= 2016 LET Access Series =

Professional women's golf tour

2016 LET Access Series season
- Duration: March 2015 – October 2015
- Number of official events: 15
- Most wins: 2 (tie): (Sweden) Jenny Haglund (Spain) María Parra
- Order of Merit winner: (Austria) Sarah Schober

The 2016 LET Access Series was a series of professional women's golf tournaments held from March through October 2016 across Europe. The LET Access Series is the second-tier women's professional golf tour in Europe and is the official developmental tour of the Ladies European Tour.

== Tournament results ==
The table below shows the 2016 schedule. The numbers in brackets after the winners' names show the number of career wins they had on the LET Access Series up to and including that event.

Dates	Tournament	Location	Prize fund (€)	Winner	WWGR points
31 Mar – 2 Apr	Terre Blanche Ladies Open	France	30,000	(Spain) Luna Sobron (1)	3
28–30 Apr	ASGI Ladies Open	Switzerland	30,000	(Spain) Carolina Gonzalez Garcia (1)	2
11–13 May	Ribeira Sacra Patrimonio de la Humanidad International Ladies Open	Spain	35,000	(France) Marion Duvernay (1)	2
19–21 May	PGA Halmstad Ladies Open at Haverdal	Sweden	40,000	(Spain) María Parra (1)	2
17–19 Jun	Borås Ladies Open	Sweden	35,000	(Sweden) Josephine Janson (1)	2
14–16 Jul	CitizenGuard LETAS Trophy	Belgium	30,000	(Netherlands) Anne van Dam (2)	2
3–5 Aug	Norrporten Ladies Open	Sweden	40,000	(Sweden) Jenny Haglund (1)	2
11–13 Aug	Drøbak Ladies Open	Norway	40,000	(Spain) María Parra (2)	2
18–20 Aug	Ladies Norwegian Open	Norway	50,000	(Sweden) Linda Wessberg (1)	2
25–27 Aug	EVLI Ladies Finnish Open	Finland	35,000	(Malaysia) Ainil Bakar (1)	2
15–17 Sep	Elisefarm Ladies Open	Sweden	35,000	(Scotland) Laura Murray (1)	2
22–24 Sep	NordicTrack Open de Strasbourg	France	30,000	(Finland) Sanna Nuutinen (1)	2
30 Sep – 2 Oct	Azores Ladies Open	Portugal	30,000	(Sweden) Jenny Haglund (2)	2
6–8 Oct	WPGA International Challenge	England	30,000	(France) Eva Gilly (1)	2
20–22 Oct	Santander Golf Tour LETAS La Peñaza	Spain	35,000	(England) Meghan MacLaren (1)	2

== Order of Merit rankings ==
The top five players on the LETAS Order of Merit earned LET membership for the 2017 Ladies European Tour. Players finishing in positions 6–20 get to skip the first stage of the qualifying event and automatically progress to the final stage of the Lalla Aicha Tour School.

Rank	Player	Country	Events	Points	Status earned
1	Sarah Schober	Austria	15	28,965	Promoted to Ladies European Tour
2	Jenny Haglund	Sweden	10	23,926	Promoted to Ladies European Tour
3	María Parra	Spain	11	21,340	Promoted to Ladies European Tour
4	Michele Thomson	Scotland	15	19,728	Promoted to Ladies European Tour
5	Sanna Nuutinen	Finland	15	19,400	Promoted to Ladies European Tour
6	Charlotte Thompson	England	12	19,358	
7	Luna Sobrón Galmés	Spain	13	16,193	
8	Emilie Alonso	France	15	13,991	
9	Csilla Lajtai-Rozsa	Hungary	10	11,915	
10	Nina Muehl	Austria	14	11,433	

== See also ==
- 2016 Ladies European Tour
- 2016 in golf
