= Lynn Carlsson =

Swedish golfer

Personal information
- Nationality: Sweden
- Born: 7 May 1994 (age 32) Varberg, Sweden
- Height: 1.69 m (5 ft 7 in)

Career
- Sport: Golf
- Turned professional: 2013
- Former tour: Ladies European Tour (2015–2019)
- Professional wins: 1

Best results in LPGA major championships
- Chevron Championship: DNP
- Women's PGA C'ship: DNP
- U.S. Women's Open: DNP
- Women's British Open: CUT: 2018, 2019
- Evian Championship: DNP

Lynn Carlsson (born 7 May 1994) is a retired Swedish professional golfer. She last played on the Ladies European Tour 2015–2019 and finished runner-up at the 2019 Women's NSW Open.

== Career ==
Carlsson grew up in Varberg and graduated 2013 from one of the two Swedish National Golf High Schools in south of Sweden before she became a professional golfer the same year and attended one of Sweden's national the Scandinavian School of Golf in Halmstad.

=== Amateur career ===
In 2007 Lynn won her first junior tournament, playing on a regional level and in addition to that victory she has 9 more wins as an amateur/junior. In 2011 she won the Pulsen Open and the Harder German Junior Masters, and the following year she was awarded the Annika Sörenstam scholarship The Collegiate Golf Experience, and got to spend time in Florida learning from Annika.

=== LET Access Series ===
In 2014 she nearly secured her first win on the LET Access Series, as she lost a playoff to Lina Boqvist at the Onsjö Ladies Open. In 2015 she was again runner-up in a LETAS event, the Sölvesborg Ladies Open hosted by Fanny Sunesson, and together with another runner-up finish at Tourfinal Vellinge Open she ended the season second on the Swedish Golf Tour Order of Merit. She was also runner-up behind Esther Henseleit at the 2019 Skaftö Open, were Carlsson posted the lowest round of her career on 63 strokes (-9) and also her lowest 54-hole score on a total of 19 under par.

=== Ladies European Tour ===
Carlsson joined the LET through the Lalla Aicha Q-School in December 2014, after finishing top-30, and easily kept her card through the order of merit the next five seasons. Her first breakthrough came in June 2015 when she finished T7 at the Deloitte Ladies Open and she also finished T10 at the Helsingborg Open. In 2018, she posted three top-10 finishes on the LET including a tie for third in the Lacoste Ladies Open de France, and she ended the season a career best 14th on the Order of Merit. In March 2019 she achieved her career best finish of T2 in the Women's NSW Open.

In 2017 she won the Swedish Matchplay Championship, just like Anna Nordqvist, Caroline Hedwall, Maria Hjorth, Helen Alfredsson and Liselotte Neumann before her. She qualified for the 2018 Women's British Open and 2019 Women's British Open through her top-25 ranking on the LET Order of Merit, but did not make the cut.

=== Retirement ===
Due to a shoulder injury, Carlsson retired from professional golf following the 2019 season, at age 25 and after only five seasons on the LET, having just posted her career best finish during the season. The final tournament Carlsson played in here career was the Magical Kenya Ladies Open 2019.

== Amateur wins ==
- 2013 Hot Screen Open, Skandia Tour Elit #6 Flickor
- 2011 Pulsen Open, Harder German Junior Masters
- 2010 Skandia Tour Riks #3 - Göteborg,
- 2009 Skandia Tour Riks #1 - Halland, DM Halland Damer
- 2008 DM Halland Damer
- 2007 Skandia Tour Distrikt #1 - Halland A, Skandia Tour Distrikt #5 - Halland B

== Professional wins (1) ==
=== Swedish Golf Tour Wins (1) ===
- 2017 Swedish Matchplay Championship

== LET career summary ==
Year	Tournaments played	Cuts made	Wins	2nd	3rd	Top 10s	Best finish	Earnings (€)	Money list rank
2015	6	4	0	0	0	3	T7	24,297	
2016	11	7	0	0	0	0	T14	29,142	57
2017	8	7	0	0	0	0	T19	18,912	69
2018	9	5	0	0	1	3	T3	47,384	14
2019	15	11	0	1	0	1	T2	35,431	40
