= Amandeep Drall =

Indian golfer

Amandeep Drall is an Indian golfer.

Drall won the fourth leg of the 2020 Hero Women's Pro Golf Tour.
