= María Parra =

Spanish professional golfer (born 1997)

Personal information
- Full name: María Parra Luque
- Nationality: Spain
- Born: 4 December 1997 (age 28) Guadiaro, Spain

Career
- Sport: Golf
- Turned professional: 2017
- Current tour: Symetra Tour (joined 2018)
- Former tours: LPGA Tour (joined 2017); LET (joined 2017)
- Professional wins: 3

Best results in LPGA major championships
- Chevron Championship: DNP
- Women's PGA C'ship: DNP
- U.S. Women's Open: T35: 2021
- Women's British Open: 73: 2016
- Evian Championship: DNP

María Parra Luque (born 4 December 1997) is a professional golfer from Spain who played on the Ladies European Tour and the LPGA Tour already as a teenager. She won the 2015 European Ladies Amateur and rose to No. 2 in the World Amateur Golf Ranking.

== Amateur career ==
Parra had a successful amateur career. In 2015, she won the European Ladies Amateur Championship in Austria and was runner-up at the Annika Invitational Europe in Sweden. She won the 2015 European Girls' Team Championship and was runner-up at the 2016 European Ladies' Team Championship, behind England. She represented Spain in the 2016 Junior Golf World Cup and the 2016 Espirito Santo Trophy, and represented Europe in the 2015 Junior Solheim Cup and the 2016 Patsy Hankins Trophy. She rose to No. 2 in the World Amateur Golf Ranking.

As the European Ladies Amateur title holder, Parra played in the 2016 Women's British Open, where she made the cut.

In 2016, while still an amateur, Parra played on the LET Access Series and won two tournaments, the PGA Halmstad Ladies Open at Haverdal in Sweden and the Drøbak Ladies Open in Norway. She finished at number 3 on the Order of Merit and earned full status for the 2017 Ladies European Tour. She also finished T13 at the Final Stage of the 2016 LPGA Qualifying Tournament to earn membership for the 2017 LPGA Tour.

== Professional career ==
As a teenager on the 2017 LPGA Tour, Parra made three cuts in 18 starts, and on the 2017 Ladies European Tour she made three cuts in 8 starts. She joined the Symetra Tour in 2018, where she recorded three top-10 finishes including a victory at the IOA Invitational in 2019, to finish 17th in the ranking.

Parra made her U.S. Women's Open debut in 2021 after sharing medalist honors with compatriot Azahara Muñoz at the Banyan Cay Resort & Country Club qualifier. She made the cut and finished T35.

== Amateur wins ==
- 2013 North of England U16
- 2015 European Ladies Amateur Championship, Campeonato Absoluto C Valenciana

== Professional wins (3) ==
=== Symetra Tour (1) ===
No.	Date	Tournament	Winning score	To par	Margin of victory	Runners-up	Ref
1	11 May 2019	IOA Invitational	72-68-70=210	−6	Playoff	(Chinese Taipei) Ssu-Chia Cheng (Republic of Ireland) Leona Maguire (United States) Madison Pressel	

=== LET Access Series (2) ===
No.	Date	Tournament	Winning score	To par	Margin of victory	Runner-up	Ref
1	21 May 2016	PGA Halmstad Ladies Open at Haverdal (as an amateur)	71-67-69=207	−9	2 strokes	(Scotland) Michele Thomson	
2	13 Aug 2016	Drøbak Ladies Open (as an amateur)	66-71-65=202	−14	Playoff	(England) Charlotte Thompson	

== Results in LPGA majors ==
Results not in chronological order

Tournament	2016	2017	2018	2019	2020	2021
ANA Inspiration						
U.S. Women's Open						T35
Women's PGA Championship						
The Evian Championship					NT	
Women's British Open	73					

Did not play

CUT = missed the half-way cut
NT = no tournament
T = tied

== Team appearances ==
Amateur

- Junior Solheim Cup (representing Europe): 2015
- European Girls' Team Championship (representing Spain): 2014, 2015 (winners)
- European Ladies' Team Championship (representing Spain): 2016
- Toyota Junior Golf World Cup (representing Spain): 2016
- Espirito Santo Trophy (representing Spain): 2016
- Patsy Hankins Trophy (representing Europe): 2016
