= Ullna Golf & Country Club =

Golf club in Sweden

Coordinates: 59.4955°N 18.1524°E

- Location in Sweden

Club information
- Location: Österåker Municipality, Stockholm County, Sweden
- Established: 1981
- Type: Private
- Total holes: 18
- Tournaments: Scandinavian Mixed; Scandinavian Enterprise Open; HP Open
- Website: ullnagolf.se

Course
- Designed by: Sven Tumba (1981); Jack Nicklaus (2013)
- Par: 72

Ullna Golf & Country Club is a golf club situated 20 km north of Stockholm on the shore of Lake Ullna in the municipality of Österåker, Sweden. The premier championship venue in the region at the time, it hosted the Scandinavian Enterprise Open on the European Tour 1983–1987.

== History ==
Opened in 1981, the course was conceived and designed by Sven Tumba with the aim of hosting international competitions of the highest level. Prince Bertil, Duke of Halland officially inaugurated the course on 27 August 1981.

Ullna has been consistently ranked as one of the finest courses in Sweden, and had until the mid-1990s, an unrivaled position as the best course in the Stockholm area. In the Swedish Golf Digest 2005 ranking of Swedish courses, it was ranked 11th. In 2020, following the Jack Nicklaus redesign, it ranked 4th. Ullna is famous for its beautiful setting. It is unique in its proximity to open water, with 6 of the 18 holes stretched along the waterfront. In 2005, course manager Magnus Adén was awarded Swedish Greenkeeper of the Year. Part of the jury's motivation was “Ullna, that has always been highly ranked, has under the leadership of Adén, reinforced its position as one of the best and finest managed courses”.

Due to the development of a number of high class golf courses in the Stockholm area in recent decades, Ullna Golf Club is no longer unmatched as the best course in the region.

The club hosted the PGA European Tour event Scandinavian Enterprise Open (SEO) 1983–1987, featuring the biggest European stars of the day. Winners include Sam Torrance (1983) and Ian Woosnam (1984). In 1988 the Eisenhower Trophy was held at Ullna. Between 1998 and 2001 the club hosted the team match competition SAS Invitational Match Play featuring stars like Colin Montgomerie, Mark O'Meara, Sergio García, Bernard Langer and Tiger Woods.

In recent years, though, the course has not been able to keep up with the rapid development in golf equipment which is making the pros hit the ball further. This has rendered the course too short for the modern pros and due to the limited land area on which it is situated, it is very difficult to lengthen. However, in 2004 Ullna hosted the Ladies European Tour event HP Open, with Annika Sörenstam as winner.

In November 2022 it was confirmed that the club was selected to host the 2023 Scandinavian Mixed, a European Tour and Ladies European Tour co-sanctioned event featuring a field of 78 women and 78 men playing for one prize fund and one trophy.

== Tournaments hosted ==
=== Professional ===
Year	Tournament	Tour	Winner
1983	Scandinavian Enterprise Open	European Tour	(Scotland) Sam Torrance
1984	Scandinavian Enterprise Open	European Tour	(Wales) Ian Woosnam
1985	Scandinavian Enterprise Open	European Tour	(Australia) Ian Baker-Finch
1986	Scandinavian Enterprise Open	European Tour	(New Zealand) Greg Turner
1987	Scandinavian Enterprise Open	European Tour	(Scotland) Gordon Brand Jnr
1987	Swedish International Stroke Play Championship	Swedish Golf Tour	(France) Marc Pendariès
2004	HP Open	Ladies European Tour	(Sweden) Annika Sörenstam
2023	Scandinavian Mixed	European Tour; Ladies European Tour	(England) Dale Whitnell

=== Amateur ===
Year	Tournament	Organizer	Winner
1988	Eisenhower Trophy	World Amateur Golf Council	(United Kingdom) Great Britain & Ireland

== See also ==
- List of golf courses in Sweden
