= Isabella Ramsay =

Swedish professional golfer

Personal information
- Nickname: Bella
- Nationality: Sweden
- Born: 12 July 1987 (age 39) Höganäs, Sweden

Career
- Sport: Golf
- Turned professional: 2006
- Former tours: Ladies European Tour; LET Access Series; Swedish Golf Tour
- Professional wins: 6

Best results in LPGA major championships
- Chevron Championship: DNP
- Women's PGA C'ship: DNP
- U.S. Women's Open: DNP
- Women's British Open: CUT: 2016
- Evian Championship: DNP

Isabella Ramsay (born 12 July 1987) is a Swedish professional golfer who played on the Ladies European Tour.

== Career ==
Ramsay turned professional in 2006 and joined the Swedish Golf Tour (SGT) in 2007. She won her first two SGT events in 2012, and joined the LET Access Series in 2013.

In the 2014 LET Access Series, she won the Kristianstad Åhus Ladies PGA Open and the Royal Belgian Golf Federation LETAS Trophy, and graduated to the Ladies European Tour as one of the top-5 on the Order of Merit along with Daisy Nielsen, Lina Boqvist, Tonje Daffinrud and Emma Westin.

Her best LET finish was T9 at the 2016 Aberdeen Asset Management Ladies Scottish Open, which also qualified her for the 2016 Women's British Open, where she did not make the cut. She comfortably kept her card by finishing the rankings 54th in 2016 and 77th in 2017.

In 2018, Ramsay retired after ten years on the Swedish Golf Tour and four years on the Ladies European Tour to become a club pro at her home club, St Arild Golf Club.

== Professional wins (6) ==
=== LET Access Series wins (2) ===
No.	Date	Tournament	Winning score	To par	Margin of victory	Runner(s)-up
1	17 May 2014	Kristianstad Åhus Ladies PGA Open^	73-70-71=214	−2	1 stroke	(Denmark) Emily Kristine Pedersen (a)
2	19 Jul 2014	Royal Belgian Golf Federation LETAS Trophy	67-71-71=209	−7	3 strokes	(Spain) Marta Sanz Barrio (a)

=== Swedish Golf Tour wins (5) ===
No.	Date	Tournament	Winning score	To par	Margin of victory	Runner(s)-up
1	6 Jun 2012	Frontwalker Ladies Open	76-75-71=222	+6	Playoff	(Sweden) Christine Hallström (Sweden) Louise Kristersson (Sweden) Cajsa Persson
2	30 Sep 2012	Nordea Tour Championship by Fredrik Jacobson	72-69-78=219	+3	1 stroke	(Sweden) Maria Ohlsson
3	19 Jul 2014	Kristianstad Åhus Ladies PGA Open^	73-70-71=214	−2	1 stroke	(Denmark) Emily Kristine Pedersen (a)
4	26 May 2018	Carpe Diem Beds Open	69-73-72=214	−2	Playoff	(Sweden) Moa Folke (Denmark) Louise Markvardsen (a)
5	2 Aug 2018	Säljfast Ladies PGA Championship	74-73-67=214	−2	Playoff	(Sweden) Sofie Bringner
