= Emma Nilsson (golfer) =

Swedish professional golfer (born 1994)

Personal information
- Nationality: Sweden
- Born: 8 March 1994 (age 32) Kristianstad, Sweden

Career
- Sport: Golf
- Turned professional: 2014
- Current tour: Ladies European Tour
- Former tour: LET Access Series
- Professional wins: 4

Best results in LPGA major championships
- Chevron Championship: DNP
- Women's PGA C'ship: DNP
- U.S. Women's Open: DNP
- Women's British Open: CUT: 2020
- Evian Championship: DNP

Achievements and awards
- LET Access Series Order of Merit: 2018

Emma Nilsson (born 8 March 1994) is a Swedish professional golfer and member of the Ladies European Tour. She was runner-up at the 2020 South African Women's Open.

== Family and early life ==
Nilsson was born in Kristianstad 1994. Her sister Sarah Nilsson, born in 1997, is also a professional golfer and was a Ladies European Tour rookie in 2017.

== Amateur career ==
As an amateur Nilsson won the Swedish Junior Strokeplay Championship in 2008, and finished 3rd at the Swedish Junior Matchplay Championship in 2011. She was runner-up at the Spanish International Ladies Amateur Championship in 2010, and 3rd in 2012. She also finished 3rd at the 2011 British Girls Open and 4th at the 2012 German Girls Open.

Nilsson played in the 2011 Junior Solheim Cup together with Céline Boutier, Charley Hull, Leona Maguire and Lisa Maguire, a bout which ended in a 12–12 tie. She won the European Girls' Team Championship in 2012 with a National Team that included Isabella Deilert and Linnea Ström.

== Professional career ==
Nilsson turned professional in 2014 and soon secured her maiden professional title at the Pilsen Golf Challenge in Prague, winning a playoff on the second hole with a par, in the process also earning a place at the Sberbank Golf Masters, her first Ladies European Tour start. She received awards from the Swedish Golf Federation's PGA Future Fund a record three times, in 2015 (Caroline Hedwall Scholarship), 2017 and 2019. She earned her LET card for the 2017 season after finishing T16 at the Lalla Aicha Tour Q-School in Morocco.

She represented Sweden at the 2018 European Golf Team Championships, teaming up with Lina Boqvist and Johan Edfors for the women's and mixed team competitions respectively.

Nilsson won the 2018 LET Access Series Order of Merit, ensuring her a Ladies European Tour card for 2019, after a season highlighted by her fourth title at the Belfius Ladies Open in Belgium and six further top-10 finishes. She comfortably retained her card by finishing 26th on the Order of Merit.

On the 2020 Ladies European Tour, in the last event before the tour was disrupted by a 5-month break due to the pandemic, she was runner-up at the South African Women's Open, one stroke behind Alice Hewson who won in her first start as a rookie member of the tour. Nilsson finished the season 43rd in the Order of Merit.

== Amateur wins ==
- 2007 Skandia Cup
- 2008 Swedish Junior Strokeplay Championship
- 2009 Junior Masters Invitational

== Professional wins (4) ==
=== LET Access Series wins (4) ===
No.	Date	Tournament	Winning score	To par	Margin of victory	Runner(s)-up
1	11 Jul 2014	Pilsen Golf Challenge	66-70-70=206	−10	Playoff	(France) Melodie Bourdy
2	14 Oct 2014	Ladies Norwegian Challenge	69-72=141^	−3	2 strokes	(Norway) Rachel Raastad
3	27 Oct 2017	Santander Golf Tour LETAS El Saler	69-70-71=210	−6	1 stroke	(Iceland) Thora Valdis Jonsdottir
4	30 Jun 2018	Belfius Ladies Open	71-69-71=211	−5	3 strokes	(France) Manon Molle, (France) Julie Aime

^Tournament shortened to 36 holes due to weather.

LET Access Series playoff record (1–0)

No.	Year	Tournament	Opponent	Result
1	2014	Pilsen Golf Challenge	(France) Melodie Bourdy	Won with par on second extra hole

== Team appearances ==
Amateur

- European Girls' Team Championship (representing Sweden):2011, 2012 (winners)
- Junior Solheim Cup (representing Europe): 2011 (tie)

Professional

- European Championships (representing Sweden): 2018
