= 2016 Ladies European Tour =

Professional women's golf tour

2016 Ladies European Tour season
- Duration: February 2016 – December 2016
- Number of official events: 21
- Most wins: 2 (tie): (United States) Beth Allen (India) Aditi Ashok (China) Shanshan Feng
- Order of Merit: (United States) Beth Allen
- Player of the Year: (United States) Beth Allen
- Rookie of the Year: (India) Aditi Ashok
- Lowest stroke average: (China) Shanshan Feng

The 2016 Ladies European Tour was a series of golf tournaments for elite female golfers from around the world, which took place from February through December 2016. The tournaments were sanctioned by the Ladies European Tour (LET).

== Schedule ==
The table below shows the 2016 schedule. The numbers in brackets after the winners' names indicate the career wins on the Ladies European Tour, including that event, and is only shown for members of the tour.

Key

Major championships
Regular events
Team championships

Date	Tournament	Host country	Winner	WWGR points	Purse	Other tours (Note: ALPG − ALPG Tour, CLPGA − China LPGA Tour, JLPGA − LPGA of Japan Tour, KLPGA − LPGA of Korea Tour, LAGT − Ladies Asian Golf Tour, LPGA − LPGA Tour.)	Notes
14 Feb	ISPS Handa New Zealand Women's Open	New Zealand	(New Zealand) Lydia Ko (5)	16	€200,000	ALPG	
21 Feb	ISPS Handa Women's Australian Open	Australia	(Japan) Haru Nomura (n/a)	26	$1,300,000	ALPG, LPGA	
28 Feb	RACV Ladies Masters	Australia	(South Korea) Jiyai Shin (4)	17.5	€250,000	ALPG	
13 Mar	World Ladies Championship	China	(South Korea) Lee Jung-min (1)	19	$700,000	KLPGA, CLPGA	Individual event
8 May	Lalla Meryem Cup	Morocco	(Spain) Nuria Iturrioz (1)	12	€450,000		
15 May	Buick Championship	China	(China) Shanshan Feng (6)	16.5	$600,000	CLPGA	
19 Jun	Tipsport Golf Masters	Czech Republic	(Denmark) Nanna Koerstz Madsen (1)	8	€250,000		
24 Jul	Aberdeen Asset Management Ladies Scottish Open	Scotland	(France) Isabelle Boineau (1)	12	€500,000		
31 Jul	Ricoh Women's British Open	England	(Thailand) Ariya Jutanugarn (2)	100	$3,000,000	LPGA	
11 Sep	ISPS Handa Ladies European Masters	Germany	(South Korea) I.K. Kim (3)	16	€500,000		
18 Sep	Evian Championship	France	(South Korea) Chun In-gee (n/a)	100	$3,250,000	LPGA	
25 Sep	Andalucia Costa Del Sol Open De España Femenino	Spain	(Spain) Azahara Muñoz (4)	12	€300,000		
9 Oct	Lacoste Ladies Open de France	France	(United States) Beth Allen (2)	8	€250,000		
16 Oct	Xiamen International Ladies Open	China	(Netherlands) Anne van Dam (1)	6	€300,000	CLPGA	
30 Oct	Sanya Ladies Open	China	(Thailand) Supamas Sangchan (1)	6	€300,000	CLPGA, LAGT	
6 Nov	Fatima Bint Mubarak Ladies Open	United Arab Emirates	(United States) Beth Allen (3)	12	$550,000		New event
13 Nov	Hero Women's Indian Open	India	(India) Aditi Ashok (1)	10	$400,000	LAGT	
26 Nov	Qatar Ladies Open	Qatar	(India) Aditi Ashok (2)	8	€500,000		New event
10 Dec	Omega Dubai Ladies Masters	United Arab Emirates	(China) Shanshan Feng (7)	18	€500,000		Reduced to 54 holes

=== Unofficial events ===
The following events appear on the schedule, but do not carry official money or Order of Merit ranking points.

Date	Tournament	Host country	Winners	WWGR points	Purse	Other tours	Notes
13 Mar	World Ladies Championship	China	(South Korea) Lee Jung-min & Ko Jin-young	–	$100,000	KLPGA, CLPGA	Team event
20 Aug	Olympic Women's Golf Competition	Brazil	(South Korea) Inbee Park	34	–		
4 Dec	The Queens	Japan	(South Korea) LPGA of Korea Tour	–	€750,000	ALPG, JLPGA, KLPGA	Team match play

== Order of Merit rankings ==
Rank	Player	Country	Earnings (€)
1	Beth Allen	United States	313,079
2	Aditi Ashok	India	206,665
3	Florentyna Parker	England	175,362
4	Georgia Hall	England	170,940
5	Isabelle Boineau	France	156,116
6	Nanna Koerstz Madsen	Denmark	142,466
7	Emily Kristine Pedersen	Denmark	131,944
8	Caroline Hedwall	Sweden	110,095
9	Camilla Lennarth	Sweden	108,694
10	Nuria Iturrioz	Spain	103,220

== Location of tournaments ==
Location of tournaments in Europe.
Major championship
National open
Regular event
Location of tournaments outside Europe.
National open
Regular event
Team event
Olympics

== See also ==
- 2016 LPGA Tour
- 2016 LET Access Series
