= Anna Becker =

Swedish golfer (born 1977)

Personal information
- Full name: Anna Becker-Frankel
- Nationality: Sweden
- Born: 23 September 1977 (age 49) Lund, Sweden
- Spouse: Peter Frankel

Career
- Sport: Golf
- College: Texas A&M University
- Turned professional: 2000
- Former tours: Ladies European Tour (2001–2004); Swedish Golf Tour (2001–2009); Nedbank Women's Golf Tour (joined 2004)
- Professional wins: 4

Anna Becker (born 23 September 1977) is a Swedish professional golfer who played on the Ladies European Tour between 2001 and 2004. She won the 1995 European Girls' Team Championship and has four titles on the Swedish Golf Tour.

== Amateur career ==
Becker started playing golf in 1983 and won the 1991 Föreningsbanken Cup in her age group. She was a member of the Swedish National Team 1994–2000, representing her country in European Championships, earning a medal in three. She won the European Girls' Team Championship in Luxembourg alongside Marie Hedberg, Jessica Krantz, Eva-Lotta Strömlid and captain Maria Brink in 1995.

In 1996 at the European Lady Junior's Team Championship at Nairn Golf Club in Scotland, she secured the Bronze medal alongside Cecilia Afzelius-Alm, Ulrika Jidflo, Jessica Lindbergh, Anna Lindblom, Helena Ohlsson and captain Anna Berg. As captain, she guided Susanna Berglund, Susanne Gillemo, Marie Hedberg, Ulrica Jidflo, Jessica Lindbergh, Isabelle Rosberg to a win at the 1997 European Ladies' Team Championship in Finland.

Becker attended Texas A&M University 1996–2000 and earned a bachelors degree in marketing. Playing with the Texas A&M Aggies women's golf team, she won the Betsy Rawls Classic and was a All-Big-12 First Team selection in 1998.

== Professional career ==
Becker turned professional in 2000 and joined the Swedish Golf Tour in 2001. The following year she won two titles and finished the season 7th in the Order of Merit. In 2004 she lost the final of the Swedish Matchplay Championship to Maria Bodén.

Becker played on the Ladies European Tour between 2001 and 2004. She recorded her first top-10 at the 2003 Australian Ladies Masters at RACV Royal Pines Resort, won by Laura Davies.

In 2004, Becker joined the Nedbank Women's Golf Tour where her best finish that season was a tie for 5th at the Telkom Women's Classic at Randpark Golf Club, won by Minea Blomqvist of Finland.

== Personal life ==
Becker married Peter Frankel and moved to South Africa in 2008, where she became Head Pro at Devonvale Golf Estate. She has coached both the Swedish National Team and the GolfRSA National Women's Squad with players such as Caitlyn Macnab.

== Amateur wins ==
- 1991 Föreningsbanken Cup
- 1998 Betsy Rawls Classic

== Professional wins (4) ==
=== Swedish Golf Tour (4) ===
No.	Date	Tournament	Winning score	To par	Margin of victory	Runner(s)-up	Ref
1	1 Sep 2002	Gefle Ladies Open	69-70-70=209	−7	3 strokes	(Sweden) Marlene Hedblom	
2	14 Sep 2002	Rejmes Ladies Open	66-70-75=211	−8	Playoff	(Sweden) Åsa Gottmo	
3	7 Sep 2003	Telia Ladies Finale	68-73-74=215	−4	Playoff	(Sweden) Lisa Hed	
4	5 Jul 2008	Kungsängen Queens Masters	71-71-74=216	+6	1 stroke	(Sweden) Antonella Cvitan (Czech Republic) Zuzana Mašínová (Finland) Jenni Kuosa	

== Team appearances ==
Amateur

- European Girls' Team Championship (representing Sweden): 1995 (winners)
- European Lady Junior's Team Championship (representing Sweden): 1996
