= Swedish Golf Tour Final (women) =

Ahlsell Final
Tournament information
- Location: Hörby, Sweden
- Established: 1997
- Course: Elisefarm Golf Club
- Tours: Swedish Golf Tour; LET Access Series
- Format: 54-hole stroke play
- Prize fund: €40,000

Tournament record score
- Aggregate: 205 Sophie Gustafson (1998)
- To par: −11 as above

Current champion
- (India) Avani Prashanth

The Swedish Golf Tour Final, currently known as the Ahlsell Final for sponsorship reason, is a women's professional golf tournament on the Swedish Golf Tour, held as the final event of the season.

The tournament was first played annually from 1997 to 2007 in September or October with Telia as the sponsor, the final installment of which was held at the newly opened Hills Golf Club near Gothenburg.

The event was discontinued after the tour changed its title sponsor from Telia to SAS in 2008, but revived when Nordea became the main sponsor in 2011.

In 2023, it was included in the LET Access Series for the first time.

== Winners ==
Year	Tour(s)	Venue	Winner	Score	Margin of victory	Runner(s)-up	Prize fund (SEK)	Ref
Ahlsell Final
2023	SGT · LETAS	Elisefarm	(India) Avani Prashanth (a)	210 (−6)	1 stroke	(Sweden) Matilda Björkman (a) (Sweden) Isabell Ekström	€40,000	
2018–2022: No tournament
SGT Tourfinal Åhus KGK ProAm
2017	SGT	Kristianstad	(Sweden) Josephine Janson	220 (+4)	2 strokes	(Sweden) Johanna Gustavsson (Sweden) Sarah Nilsson	300,000	
Tourfinal Vellinge Open
2016	SGT	Ljunghusen	(Sweden) Jenny Haglund	223 (+7)	Playoff	(Sweden) Emma Nilsson	300,000	
2015	SGT	Ljunghusen	(Sweden) Sarah Nilsson (a)	218 (+2)	4 strokes	(Sweden) Lynn Carlsson	300,000	
2014: No tournament
Tourfinal Svedala Open
2013	SGT	Bokskogen	(Sweden) Julia Davidsson	219 (+3)	2 strokes	(Sweden) Linnea Torsson	300,000	
Nordea Tour Championship
2012	SGT	Kungsbacka	(Sweden) Isabella Ramsay	219 (+3)	1 stroke	(Sweden) Maria Ohlsson	300,000	
2011	SGT	Vallda	(Sweden) Julia Davidsson	212 (−4)	1 stroke	(Denmark) Daisy Nielsen (a)	300,000	
2008–2010: No tournament
Telia Ladies Finale
2007	SGT	Hills	(Slovakia) Zuzana Kamasova	218 (+2)	Playoff	(Sweden) Eva Bjärvall (Sweden) Emma Zackrisson	300,000	
2006	SGT	Bro-Bålsta	(Sweden) Anna Berg	212 (–1)	Playoff	(Sweden) Caroline Hedwall (a)	300,000	
2005	SGT	Bro-Bålsta	(Sweden) Anna Berg	215 (–1)	2 strokes	(Sweden) Anna Tybring	300,000	
2004	SGT	Bro-Bålsta	(Sweden) Linda Wessberg	212 (–7)	1 stroke	(Denmark) Mianne Bagger	300,000	
2003	SGT	Bro-Bålsta	(Sweden) Anna Becker	215 (–4)	Playoff	(Sweden) Lisa Hed	300,000	
2002	SGT	Lund	(Sweden) Anna Corderfeldt	212 (–4)	2 strokes	(Sweden) Johanna Westerberg	300,000	
2001	SGT	Lund	(Sweden) Sara Eklund	210 (–6)	10 strokes	(Sweden) Pernilla Sterner	225,000	
Gula Sidorna Ladies Finale
2000	SGT	Bro-Bålsta	(Sweden) Lisa Hed	216 (–3)	4 strokes	(Sweden) Marie Hedberg	225,000	
1999	SGT	Johannesberg	(Sweden) Malin Burström	212 (–4)	Playoff	(Sweden) Susanna Hanson (a)	225,000	
Telia Ladies Finale
1998	SGT	Johannesberg	(Sweden) Sophie Gustafson	205 (–11)	6 strokes	(Sweden) Anna Berg	225,000	
Telia InfoMedia Ladies Finale
1997	SGT	Johannesberg	(Sweden) Malin Burström	213 (–3)	2 strokes	(Sweden) Malin Tveit	213,000	
