= Volkswagen Kallfors Open =

Coordinates: 59.106°N 17.539°E

Tournament information
- Location: Stockholm County, Sweden
- Established: 2004
- Course: Kallfors Golf Club
- Par: 72
- Tour: Swedish Golf Tour
- Format: Stroke play
- Prize fund: SEK 250,000
- Month played: October
- Final year: 2009

Tournament record score
- Aggregate: 140 Lotta Wahlin
- To par: −4 as above

Final champion
- (Italy) Anna Rossi

Location map
- Location in Europe

The Volkswagen Kallfors Open was a women's professional golf tournament on the Swedish Golf Tour played between 2004 and 2009 near Stockholm, Sweden.

== Winners ==
Year	Winner	Country	Score	Margin of victory	Runner-up	Purse (SEK)	Venue	Note	Ref
Volkswagen Kallfors Open
2009	Anna Rossi	Italy	−1 (70-73-72=215)	2 strokes	(Sweden) Johanna Westerberg	250,000	Kallfors		
2008	Zuzana Mašínová	Czech Republic	−1 (70-68-77=215)	2 strokes	(Sweden) Karin Börjeskog	300,000	Kallfors		
2007: No tournament
Booz Allen Nordic Classic
2006	Kaisa Ruuttila	Finland	−2 (75-67=142)	1 stroke	(Sweden) Hanna-Sofia Leijon	200,000	Mälarö	Pro-am (Note: Limited-field pro-am)	
2005	Lotta Wahlin	Sweden	−4 (69-71=140)	4 strokes	(Sweden) Anna Berg	100,000	Mälarö	Pro-am	
Österåker Ladies Masters
2004	Riikka Hakkarainen	Finland	−1 (73-70-72=215)	4 strokes	(Sweden) Helena Alterby	300,000	Österåker		
