= 2004 Swedish Golf Tour (women) =

19th season of the Swedish Golf Tour (women)

2004 Swedish Golf Tour (women) season
- Duration: May 2004 – September 2004
- Number of official events: 12
- Most wins: 2 (tie): (Sweden) Maria Bodén (Sweden) Linda Wessberg
- Order of Merit: (Sweden) Emelie Svenningsson

The 2004 Swedish Golf Tour, known as the Telia Tour for sponsorship reasons, was the 19th season of the Swedish Golf Tour, a series of professional golf tournaments for women held in Sweden and Finland.

Linda Wessberg and Maria Bodén both won two events and Emelie Svenningsson won the Order of Merit.

== Schedule ==
The season consisted of 12 tournaments played between May and September, where one event was held in Finland.

Date	Tournament	Location	Winner	Score	Margin of victory	Runner(s)-up	Purse (SEK)	Note	Ref
11 May	Telia Grand Opening	Göteborg	(Sweden) Antonella Cvitan	144 (+2)	1 stroke	(Denmark) Lisa Holm Sørensen	100,000	Pro-am	
3 Jun	Beirut Café Ladies Trophy	Mälarö	(Sweden) Louise Stahle (a)	137 (−7)	2 strokes	(Denmark) Lisa Holm Sørensen	100,000		
20 Jun	Felix Finnish Ladies Open	Aura, Finland	(Finland) Hanna-Leena Ronkainen (a)	205 (−8)	2 strokes	(Finland) Minea Blomqvist	175,000		
3 Jul	SM Match	Kevinge	(Sweden) Maria Bodén			(Sweden) Anna Becker	150,000		
10 Jul	Rejmes Ladies Open	Bråviken	(Sweden) Anna Nordqvist (a)	217 (+1)	Playoff	(Sweden) Nina Reis	150,000		
24 Jul	Gefle Ladies Open	Gävle	(Sweden) Emelie Svenningsson	213 (−3)	3 strokes	(Sweden) Hanna-Sofia Svenningsson (Sweden) Josefine Lundin (Norway) Lill Kristin Saether	200,000		
1 Aug	Österåker Ladies Masters	Österåker	(Finland) Riikka Hakkarainen	215 (−1)	4 strokes	(Sweden) Helena Alterby	300,000		
20 Aug	Swedish International	Upsala	(Sweden) Maria Bodén	211 (−5)	4 strokes	(Sweden) Sara Jelander	150,000		
28 Aug	Skandia PGA Open	Arlandastad	(Sweden) Linda Wessberg	207 (−3)	1 stroke	(Sweden) Helena Svensson	360,000		
4 Sep	Öijared Ladies Open	Öijared	(Finland) Minea Blomqvist	210 (−6)	1 stroke	(Finland) Ursula Wikström	200,000		
10 Sep	CA Ladies Trophy	Brollsta/Ullna	(Sweden) Helena Alterby	217 (+1)	3 strokes	(Sweden) Helena Svensson	150,000	Pro-am	
19 Sep	Telia Ladies Finale	Bro-Bålsta	(Sweden) Linda Wessberg	212 (−7)	1 stroke	(Denmark) Mianne Bagger	300,000		

National Championship tournaments

== Order of Merit ==
Rank	Player	Score
1	(Sweden) Emelie Svenningsson	1,584
2	(Sweden) Linda Wessberg	1,289
3	(Sweden) Maria Bodén	1,150
4	(Sweden) Hanna-Sofia Svenningsson	1,102
5	(Sweden) Helena Svensson	1,004
6	(Sweden) Helena Alterby	998
7	(Finland) Riikka Hakkarainen	982
8	(Sweden) Nina Reis	908
8	(Sweden) Antonella Cvitan	834
10	(Finland) Pia Maria Koivuranta	829

== See also ==
- 2004 Swedish Golf Tour (men's tour)
