= Zuzana Kamasová =

Slovakian professional golfer (born 1978)

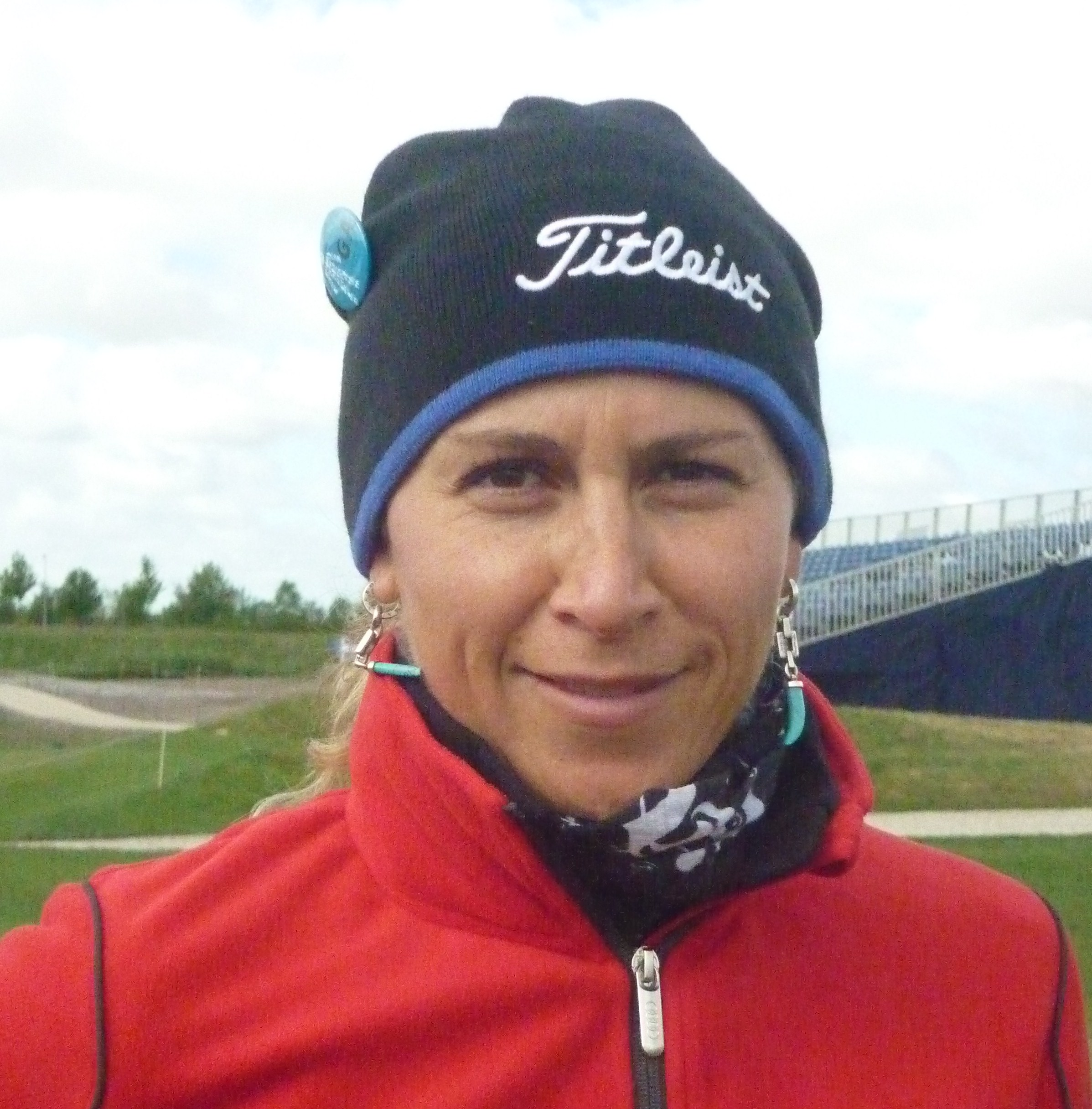

Personal information
- Nationality: Slovakia
- Born: 14 May 1978 (age 48) Bratislava, Czechoslovakia

Career
- Sport: Golf
- College: Florida Atlantic University; University of North Carolina at Greensboro
- Turned professional: 2004
- Former tours: Ladies European Tour (joined 2005); Swedish Golf Tour
- Professional wins: 2

Number of wins by tour
- Ladies European Tour: 1

Best results in LPGA major championships
- Chevron Championship: DNP
- Women's PGA C'ship: DNP
- U.S. Women's Open: CUT: 2011
- Women's British Open: DNP
- Evian Championship: DNP

Zuzana Kamasová (born 14 May 1978) is a Slovak professional golfer. She won the Lalla Meryem Cup in 2011 to become the first Slovak and Eastern European to win on the Ladies European Tour.

== Career ==
Kamasová won the Slovak Championship seven times and represented her country at the Espirito Santo Trophy three times, 2000 in Germany, 2002 in Malaysia, 2004 in Puerto Rico.

Kamasová earned limited status on the LET at Q-School in November 2004, and turned professional. Between 2004 and 2007 she only made two cuts, but in 2008 she earned her first top-10 finish at the Suzhou Taihu Ladies Open in China, T9 and 10 strokes behind winner Annika Sörenstam.

With limited LET starts available Kamasová also played on the Swedish Golf Tour, losing a playoff to Florence Lüscher of Switzerland at the 2007 Rejmes Ladies Open, but prevailing in a playoff at the 2007 Telia Ladies Finale for her first professional title. She also finished runner-up at the 2009 VW Söderbergs Ladies Masters, two strokes behind Daniela Holmqvist.

In 2011 Kamasová won the Lalla Meryem Cup in Morocco, two strokes clear of the competition, to become the first Slovak and Eastern European to secure a victory on the LET. She appeared at the 2011 Women's British Open but did not make the cut.

She retired from tour after the 2013 season.

== Professional wins (2) ==
=== Ladies European Tour wins (1) ===
No.	Date	Tournament	Winning score	To par	Margin of victory	Runner-up
1	3 Apr 2011	Lalla Meryem Cup	71-68-71-76=286	−2	2 strokes	(France) Alexandra Bonetti (Germany) Caroline Masson (England) Kiran Matharu

=== Swedish Golf Tour wins (1) ===
No.	Date	Tournament	Winning score	To par	Margin of victory	Runner-up
1	5 Oct 2007	Telia Ladies Finale	77-69-72=218	+2	Playoff	(Sweden) Eva Bjärvall (Sweden) Emma Zackrisson

== Team appearances ==
Amateur

- Espirito Santo Trophy (representing Slovakia): 2000, 2002, 2004
