= Nancy McDaniel =

Women's golf coach (1966–2024)

Biographical details
- Born: November 11, 1966; Portland, Oregon, U.S.
- Died: October 23, 2024 (aged 57); Oakland, California, U.S.
- Education: University of Washington

Coaching career (HC unless noted)
- 29: University of California Golden Bears

Head coaching record
- Tournaments: 7

Accomplishments and honors

Championships
- 1

Awards
- Pac-12 Coach of the Year (2×), Women's Golf Coaches Association Hall of Fame (2016), Cal Athletics Hall of Fame (2024)

Nancy Kessler McDaniel (November 11, 1966 – October 23, 2024) was the founding coach for the University of California's women's golf program. McDaniel coached the California Golden Bears women's golf team for 29 seasons, where they made 23 NCAA regional appearances. Under her tenure, the team would head to the NCAA Championships 10 times.

== Biography ==
McDaniel was born in Portland, Oregon on November 11, 1966. She first began playing golf at age eight at Waverley Country Club.

=== College golf ===
McDaniel was recruited to play golf at the University of Washington by Mary Lou Mulflur. In 1988, McDaniel served as team captain during her senior year at University of Washington, where she earned All-American and Pac-10 All-Decade Team honors. McDaniel ranks in the top 10 for victories in University of Washington's women's golf program.

=== Professional golfer ===
After college, McDaniel competed for five years as a professional on the Women's European, Ladies Asian and Players West golf tours in the early 1990s. In 1993, she finished 13th on the Ladies Asian Tour.

=== Cal golf coach ===
In 1995, McDaniel started the women's golf program at the University of California. Six years after starting the program, McDaniel's team made their first appearance in the NCAA National tournament. While coaching at Cal, she was named Pac-10 Coach of the Year twice, in 2001 and 2002. In 2002, the Golden Bears were ranked 2 nationally, their highest ranking. In 2003, she was named the LPGA Teaching and Club Professional Coach of the Year and also was named Golfweek's Coach of the Year. In 2004, one of her players, Sarah Huarte, won the individual national title and was chosen to represent the United States at the 2004 Curtis Cup.

McDaniel was particularly recognized for her international player signings. In 1998, McDaniel signed her first international player, Anne Walker from Scotland. When asked later about her international signings, McDaniel shared, "One of the reasons we recruit these players is due to the great experience that is had on these teams". Daniela Holmqvist, a player recruited by McDaniel from Sweden would go on to play in the LPGA Tour. Vikki Laing, recruited from Scotland, would help the Golden Bears win the 2003 NCAA Central Regional title and turned professional the following year. Sophia Sheridan, recruited from Mexico, would go on to play on the LPGA and Epson Tours and win the 2006 Mexican Women's Amateur Championship. In 2022, Cristina Ochoa, one of McDaniel's international signings won the inaugural NCGA Women's Amateur Championship.

Several of McDaniel's recruits would go on to pursue careers as golf coaches. Sarah Huarte Glynn became the head women's golf coach at the University of San Francisco. Sofie Andersson, a 2006 graduate would return to Cal as an assistant coach. Another of McDaniel's standout players, Anne Walker, would go on to coach the Stanford Women's golf team. Anna Temple, another McDaniel recruit, would go on to be named the head women's golf coach at University of Washington, replacing McDaniel's former coach Mary Lou Mulfur.

=== Breast cancer diagnosis and advocacy ===
McDaniel was first diagnosed with breast cancer in 2015. After her diagnosis, she became active in breast cancer advocacy, teaching clinics to benefit breast cancer research. In 2016, McDaniel underwent a double mastectomy where she learned her cancer had spread to her lymph nodes. After chemotherapy and radiation treatment, McDaniel went into remission two years after her initial diagnosis, but the cancer returned in 2023. She also lent her name to Stanford's PlayForHer initiative, responsible for raising nearly $450,000 for breast cancer research. Funds raised from the initiative went to support breast cancer research undertaken by McDaniel's oncologist, Dr. Hope Rugo.

McDaniel retired from coaching duties at Cal in May 2024 to focus on her health. McDaniel died of complications of breast cancer on October 23, 2024, at age 57.

=== Recognition and legacy ===
McDaniel coached 17 All American players and 43 All-Pac 10/12 players during her time as a coach. The California Golden Bears would make 10 appearances at the NCAA Championships under her leadership. In 2016, McDaniel was named to the Women's Golf Coaches Association Hall of Fame. In 2024, she was inducted in the Cal Athletics Hall of Fame and the National Golf Coaches Association Hall of Fame. Shortly before her death, McDaniel was inducted into the Northern California Golf Association's Hall of Fame.
