= 2001 Swedish Golf Tour (women) =

16th season of the Swedish Golf Tour (women)

2001 Swedish Golf Tour (women) season
- Duration: May 2001 – September 2001
- Number of official events: 9
- Most wins: 2: (Sweden) Maria Bodén (Sweden) Pernilla Sterner
- Order of Merit: (Sweden) Maria Bodén

The 2001 Swedish Golf Tour, known as the Telia Tour for sponsorship reasons, was the 16th season of the Swedish Golf Tour, a series of professional golf tournaments for women held in Sweden and Finland.

Maria Bodén and Pernilla Sterner both won two events, with Bodén winning the Order of Merit ahead of Sterner on account of three runner-up finishes.

== Schedule ==
The season consisted of nine tournaments played between May and September, where one event was held in Finland.

Date	Tournament	Location	Winner	Score	Margin of victory	Runner(s)-up	Purse (SEK)	Note	Ref
14 May	Telia Grand Opening	Fågelbro	(Sweden) Pernilla Sterner	140 (−2)	1 stroke	(Sweden) Åsa Gottmo	100,000	Pro-am	
10 Jun	Albatross Ladies Open	Albatross	(Sweden) Maria Bodén	227 (+11)	2 strokes	(Sweden) Karin Sjödin	125,000		
17 Jun	Felix Finnish Ladies Open	Aura, Finland	(Sweden) Pernilla Sterner	211 (−5)	3 strokes	(Sweden) Maria Bodén (Finland) Ursula Wikström	150,000		
1 Jul	Körunda Ladies Open	Nynäshamn	(Denmark) Christina Kuld	209 (−7)	6 strokes	(Sweden) Maria Bodén	150,000		
14 Jul	SI · Gefle Ladies Open	Gävle	(Sweden) Malin Burström	212 (−4)	1 stroke	(Sweden) Maria Bodén (Sweden) Susanna Gustafsson	200,000		
5 Aug	Öijared Ladies Open	Öijared	(Norway) Line Berg	215 (−1)	Playoff	(Sweden) Rind Åström	150,000		
25 Aug	Skandia PGA Open	Bokskogen	(Sweden) Maria Bodén	209 (−7)	4 strokes	(Sweden) Hanna Hell	250,000		
2 Sep	SM Match	Tomelilla	(Sweden) Cecilia Sjöblom	6&5		(Sweden) Golda Johansson (a)	150,000		
9 Sep	Telia Ladies Finale	Lund	(Sweden) Sara Eklund	210 (−6)	10 strokes	(Sweden) Pernilla Sterner	225,000		

National Championship tournaments

== Order of Merit ==
Rank	Player	Score
1	(Sweden) Maria Bodén	1,475
1	(Sweden) Pernilla Sterner	1,112
1	(Sweden) Susanna Gustafsson	1,000
1	(Sweden) Malin Burström	887
1	(Sweden) Cecilia Sjöblom	823
1	(Sweden) Hanna Hell	788
1	(Sweden) Sara Eklund	732
1	(Sweden) Anna Corderfeldt	706
1	(Sweden) Rind Åström	631
1	(Sweden) Johanna Westerberg	611

== See also ==
- 2001 Swedish Golf Tour (men's tour)
