= Öijared Ladies Open =

Tournament information
- Location: Gothenburg, Sweden
- Established: 1996
- Course: Öijared Golf Club
- Tour: Swedish Golf Tour
- Format: 54-hole stroke play
- Prize fund: SEK 150,000
- Final year: 2006

Tournament record score
- Aggregate: 206 Sofia Renell (2003)
- To par: −10 as above

Final champion
- (France) Frederique Dorbes

The Öijared Ladies Open was a women's professional golf tournament on the Swedish Golf Tour played annually from 1996 until 2006. It was always held at the Öijared Golf Club in Lerum near Gothenburg, Sweden.

== Winners ==
Year	Winner	Score	Margin of victory	Runner(s)-up	Prize fund (SEK)	Ref
2006	(France) Frederique Dorbes	212 (–4)	2 strokes	(Sweden) Caroline Westrup (a)	150,000	
2005	(Sweden) Anna Tybring	210 (–6)	3 strokes	(Sweden) Anna Berg (Sweden) Nina Reis	200,000	
2004	(Finland) Minea Blomqvist	210 (–6)	1 stroke	(Finland) Ursula Wikström	200,000	
2003	(Sweden) Sofia Renell	206 (–10)	5 strokes	(Sweden) Maria Bodén (Sweden) Sara Odelius (a)	200,000	
2002	(Sweden) Rind Åström	209 (–4)	3 strokes	(Sweden) Johanna Westerberg	200,000	
2001	(Norway) Line Berg	215 (–1)	Playoff	(Sweden) Rind Åström	150,000	
2000	(Sweden) Karin Sjödin (a)	219 (+3)	1 stroke	(Sweden) Isabelle Rosberg	150,000	
LB Data Ladies Open
1999	(Sweden) Sara Eklund	212 (–1)	1 stroke	(Sweden) Linda Ericsson (Sweden) Susanna Gustafsson	150,000	
1998	(Sweden) Nina Karlsson	211 (–5)	4 strokes	(Sweden) Malin Burström	100,000	
Lerum Ladies Open
1997	(Sweden) Catrin Nilsmark	209 (–7)	6 strokes	(Sweden) Sara Melin (Sweden) Susann Norberg (Sweden) Pernilla Sterner (Sweden) Malin Tveit	100,000	
1996	(Sweden) Maria Bertilsköld	217 (+1)	Playoff	(Sweden) Sara Eklund (a)	100,000	
