= Sofia Renell =

Swedish professional golfer

Personal information
- Nationality: Sweden
- Born: 31 January 1980 (age 46) Norrköping, Sweden

Career
- Sport: Golf
- Turned professional: 2002
- Former tours: Ladies European Tour (2003–2008); Swedish Golf Tour (2002–2009)
- Professional wins: 1

Sofia Renell (born 31 January 1980) is a retired Swedish professional golfer who played on the Ladies European Tour 2003–2008. She was runner-up at the 2007 Ladies Scottish Open.

== Amateur career ==
In 1996 Renell won the final of the Föreningsbanken Cup held at Rya Golf Club, a competition that attracted 8,786 entrants across the country, joining previous winners such as Liselotte Neumann and Eva Dahllöf.

Competing on the Junior Masters Invitational circuit in 2001, she was runner-up at the McDonald's Junior Trophy in Örebro, and won the Östgöta Junior Open held at Norrköping Golf Club.

== Professional career ==
Renell turned professional in 2002 and joined the Swedish Golf Tour. In 2003, she won the Öijared Ladies Open by five strokes ahead of Sara Odelius and Maria Bodén.

At the end of 2002, Renell earned partial status for the Ladies European Tour at Q-School. She made her first cut at the 2003 Ladies Italian Open.

Renell earned fully exempt status in late 2005 by finishing tied for 3rd at LET Q-School, behind only Ellen Smets of Belgium and Sarah Kemp of Australia.

Her best finish on the LET came in 2007, when she was runner-up behind Sophie Gustafson at the Ladies Scottish Open held at The Carrick, alongside English players Kirsty Taylor and Danielle Masters.

== Amateur wins ==
- 1996 Föreningsbanken Cup
- 2001 Östgöta Junior Open

== Professional wins ==
=== Swedish Golf Tour wins ===
| Date | Tournament | Winning score | To par | Margin of victory | Runner(s)-up | Ref |
|---|---|---|---|---|---|---|
| 2 Aug 2003 | Öijared Ladies Open | 68-71-67=206 | –10 | 1 stroke | (Sweden) Maria Bodén (Sweden) Sara Odelius (a) | |
