= Zackrisson =

Zackrisson is a surname. Notable people with the surname include:

- Emma Zackrisson (born 1979), Swedish golfer
- Hampus Zackrisson (born 1994), Swedish footballer
- Mia Boman (Maria, née Zackrisson) (born 1975), Swedish curler and coach
- Patrik Zackrisson (born 1987), Swedish ice hockey player
