= 2004 Swedish Golf Tour =

Golf tour season

2004 Swedish Golf Tour season
- Duration: 10 May 2004 – 24 September 2004
- Number of official events: 14
- Order of Merit: (Sweden) Magnus A. Carlsson

The 2004 Swedish Golf Tour, titled as the 2004 Telia Tour for sponsorship reasons, was the 21st season of the Swedish Golf Tour, the main professional golf tour in Sweden since it was formed in 1984, with most tournaments being incorporated into the Nordic Golf League since 1999.

== Schedule ==
The following table lists official events during the 2004 season.

Date	Tournament	Location	Purse (SKr)	Winner (Note: The number in brackets after each winner's name is the number of Swedish Golf Tour events they had won up to and including that tournament. As most Swedish Golf Tour events are incorporated into the Nordic Golf League or Challenge Tour schedules, details of these wins are displayed there instead.)	Main tour (Note: CHA − Challenge Tour; NGL − Nordic Golf League.)
11 May	Telia Grand Opening	Västergötland	100,000	(Sweden) Eric Carlberg	NGL
16 May	Gambro Open	Skåne	175,000	(Sweden) Björn Bäck	NGL
30 May	Rönnebäck Open	Skåne	250,000	(Sweden) Peter Viktor	NGL
6 Jun	Kinnaborg Open	Västergötland	200,000	(Sweden) Magnus A. Carlsson	NGL
13 Jun	St Ibb Open	Skåne	250,000	(Sweden) Linus Pettersson	NGL
20 Jun	Husqvarna Open	Småland	350,000	(Sweden) Patrik Sjöland	NGL
3 Jul	SM Match	Uppland	200,000	(Sweden) Magnus A. Carlsson	NGL
9 Jul	Saltsjöbadskannan	Södermanland	150,000	(Sweden) Eric Carlberg	NGL
8 Aug	Waxholm Open	Uppland	200,000	(Sweden) Björn Pettersson	NGL
20 Aug	Swedish International	Uppland	200,000	(Sweden) Hampus von Post	NGL
29 Aug	Skandia PGA Open	Uppland	1,000,000	(England) Matthew King	CHA
4 Sep	Västerås Open	Västmanland	250,000	(Finland) Thomas Sundström	NGL
12 Sep	Telia Grand Prix	Skåne	1,200,000	(England) Lee Slattery	CHA
24 Sep	Nordic League Final	Denmark	€27,000	(Norway) Øyvind Rojahn	NGL

== Order of Merit ==
The Order of Merit was based on tournament results during the season, calculated using a points-based system.

Position	Player	Points
1	(Sweden) Magnus A. Carlsson	1,605
2	(Sweden) Hampus von Post	1,462
3	(Sweden) Eric Carlberg	1,441
4	(Finland) Thomas Sundström	1,342
5	(Sweden) Linus Pettersson	1,134

== See also ==
- 2004 Danish Golf Tour
- 2004 Finnish Tour
- 2004 Swedish Golf Tour (women)
