= Frontwalker Ladies Open =

Tournament information
- Location: Botkyrka, Sweden
- Established: 2005
- Course: Botkyrka Golf Club
- Par: 72
- Tour: Swedish Golf Tour
- Format: 54-hole stroke play
- Prize fund: SEK 200,000
- Final year: 2014

Tournament record score
- Aggregate: 213 Mikaela Bäckstedt (2005)
- To par: −3 Josefin Leijon (2007)

Final champion
- (Sweden) Natalie Wille

The Frontwalker Ladies Open was a women's professional golf tournament on the Swedish Golf Tour, played between 2005 and 2014. It was always held in Botkyrka near Stockholm, Sweden.

== Winners ==
Year	Winner	Score	Margin of victory	Runner(s)-up	Prize fund (SEK)	Ref
Frontwalker Ladies Open
2014	(Sweden) Natalie Wille	217 (+1)	Playoff	(Sweden) Sara Ardström	200,000	
2013	(Sweden) Elin Andersson	216 (+3)	1 stroke	(Sweden) Camilla Lennarth	200,000	
2012	(Sweden) Isabella Ramsay	222 (+6)	Playoff	(Sweden) Christine Hallström (Sweden) Louise Kristersson (Sweden) Cajsa Persson	200,000	
IT-Arkitekterna Ladies Open
2011	(Sweden) Eva Bjärvall	217 (+1)	Playoff	(Sweden) Karin Börjeskog	200,000	
2010	(United States) Mallory Fraiche	219 (E)	1 stroke	(Sweden) Malin Jansson	200,000	
2009	(Sweden) Karin Börjeskog	225 (+3)	4 strokes	(Sweden) Josefin Leijon	250,000	
2008	(Sweden) Catrin Nilsmark	219 (+3)	2 strokes	(Sweden) Josefin Leijon (Czech Republic) Zuzana Mašínová	300,000	
2007	(Sweden) Josefin Leijon	216 (–3)	Playoff	(Japan) Rui Yokomine	150,000	
2006	(Sweden) Helena Svensson	220 (+1)	1 stroke	(Sweden) Eva Bjärvall (Sweden) Golda Johansson	150,000	
2005	(Sweden) Mikaela Bäckstedt (a)	213 (E)	3 strokes	(Sweden) Golda Johansson (a) (Sweden) Nina Reis	150,000	
