= Edith Cummings Munson Golf Award =

Collegiate golf award

- Description: Awarded to a top collegiate female golfer who excels in both athletics and academics
- Country: United Kingdom
- Presented by: Women's Golf Coaches Association (WGCA)
- First award: 1998
- Currently held by: Louise Rydqvist

The Edith Cummings Munson Golf Award is an annual award inspired by Edith Cummings Munson that is given to one of the top collegiate female golfers who excels in academics. The award is presented by the National Golf Coaches Association (NGCA).

Established in 1998, the award is presented annually to the Women's NCAA Division I golfer who is an upperclassman and both a WGCA All-American Scholar and All-American. If multiple golfers qualify, the award goes to the individual with the highest GPA.

== Recipients ==
Year	Winner	College
1989	Elsabe Heffer	Lamar
1990	JoAnne Brooks	Nebraska
1991	Traci Hanson	San Jose State
1992	Stephanie Martin	Oklahoma State
1993	Stephanie Neill	Wake Forest
1994	Katharina Larsson	Tennessee
1995	Heather Bowie	Arizona State
1996	Marcie Clemmons	Auburn
1997	Karen Margrethe Juul	San Jose State
1998	Julia Boros	Georgia
1999	Hilary Homeyes	Stanford
2000	Lisette Lee	LSU
2001	Stacy Prammanasudh	Tulsa
2002	Emma Zackrisson	Oklahoma State
2003	Alena Sharp	New Mexico State
2004	Kailin Downs	New Mexico
2005	Karin Sjödin	Oklahoma State
2006	Amanda Blumenherst	Duke
2007	Marci Turner	Tennessee
2008	Azahara Muñoz	Arizona State
2009	Azahara Muñoz	Arizona State
2010	Juliana Murcia	Arizona State
2011	Brooke Pancake	Alabama
2012	Brooke Pancake	Alabama
2013	Stephanie Meadow	Alabama
2014	Stephanie Meadow	Alabama
2015	Noemí Jiménez	Arizona State
2016	Laura Lonardi	Baylor
2017	Leona Maguire	Duke
2018	Leona Maguire	Duke
2019	Albane Valenzuela	Stanford
2020	Lauren Hartlage	Louisville
2021	Sara Kouskova	Texas
2022	Chiara Tamburlini	Mississippi
2023	Laney Frye	Kentucky
2024	Louise Rydqvist	South Carolina
2025	Louise Rydqvist	South Carolina

== See also ==
- List of sports awards honoring women
