= Gefle Ladies Open =

Tournament information
- Location: Gävle, Sweden
- Established: 1996
- Course: Gävle Golf Club
- Tour: Swedish Golf Tour
- Format: 54-hole stroke play
- Prize fund: SEK 200,000
- Final year: 2007

Tournament record score
- Aggregate: 207 Maria Bodén (2003)
- To par: −9 as above

Final champion
- (Sweden) Caroline Hedwall

The Gefle Ladies Open was a women's professional golf tournament on the Swedish Golf Tour played from 1999 until 2007. It was always held at the Gävle Golf Club in Gävle, Sweden.

Gävle Golf Club had hosted the Gefle Open on the men's Swedish Golf Tour since the tour's inception in 1984, but switched to hosting the women's event starting in 1999. In 2005 the club hosted the Gävle Energi Open on the men's tour instead.

Several installments of the tournament doubled as the women's Swedish International.

== Winners ==
Year	Winner	Score	Margin of victory	Runner(s)-up	Prize fund (SEK)	Ref
2007	(Sweden) Caroline Hedwall	215 (–1)	Playoff	(Switzerland) Florence Lüscher	200,000	
2006	(Finland) Kaisa Ruuttila	208 (–8)	Playoff	(Austria) Katharina Werdinig	200,000	
2005: No tournament
2004	(Sweden) Emelie Svenningsson	213 (–3)	3 strokes	(Sweden) Hanna-Sofia Svenningsson (Sweden) Josefine Lundin (Norway) Lill Kristin Saether	200,000	
2003	(Sweden) Maria Bodén	207 (–9)	3 strokes	(Sweden) Cecilia Ekelundh (Sweden) Erica Steen	200,000	
2002	(Sweden) Anna Becker	209 (–7)	3 strokes	(Sweden) Marlene Hedblom	200,000	
2001	(Sweden) Malin Burström	212 (–4)	1 stroke	(Sweden) Maria Bodén (Sweden) Susanna Gustafsson	200,000	
2000	(Sweden) Lisa Hed	214 (+1)	Playoff	(Finland) Riikka Hakkarainen	200,000	
1999	(Sweden) Hanna Hell	214 (–2)	Playoff	(Sweden) Susanna Hanson (a) (Norway) Suzann Pettersen	200,000	

== See also ==
- Gefle Open (men's event)
