= Linda Wessberg =

Swedish professional golfer (born 1980)

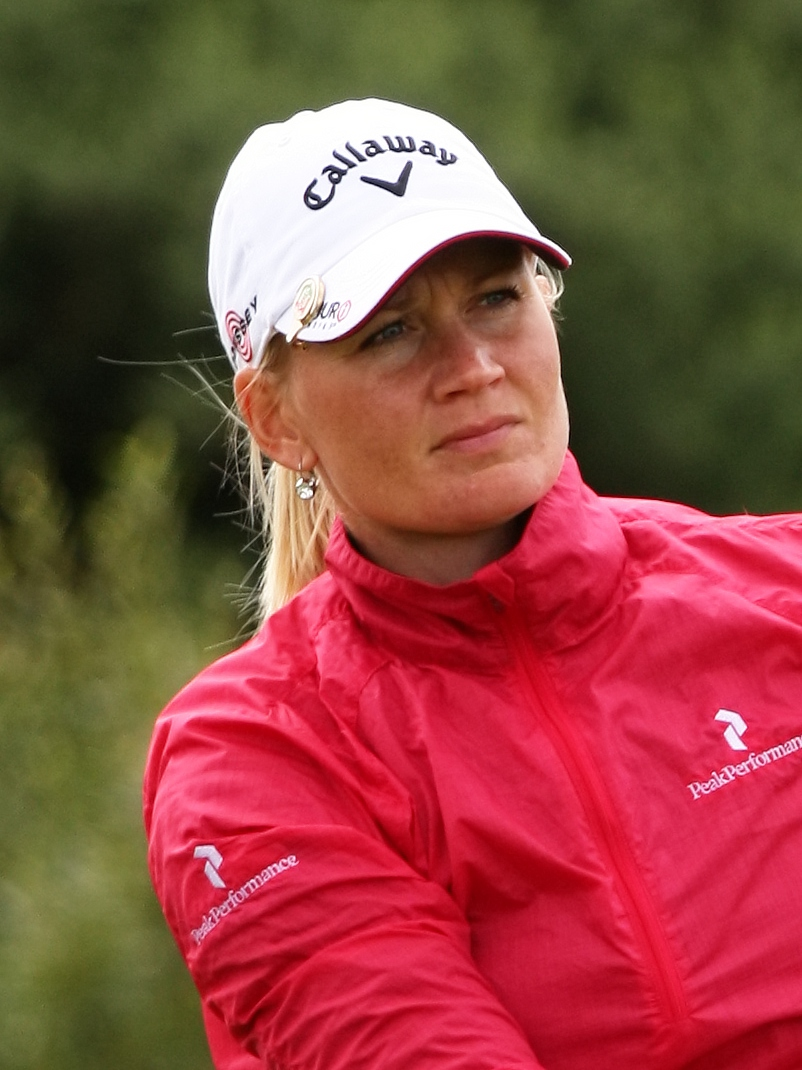
- Wessberg at the 2010 Women's British Open

Personal information
- Full name: Linda Maria Wessberg
- Nationality: Sweden
- Born: 13 June 1980 (age 46) Gothenburg, Sweden
- Height: 5 ft 9 in (1.75 m)
- Life partner: Peter Sällqvist
- Children: 1

Career
- Sport: Golf
- College: Oklahoma State University
- Turned professional: 2003
- Current tour: Ladies European Tour (joined 2004)
- Former tours: LPGA Tour (2007–2009); Swedish Golf Tour (joined 2003)
- Professional wins: 8

Number of wins by tour
- Ladies European Tour: 3
- Other: 5

Best results in LPGA major championships
- Chevron Championship: CUT: 2007, 2008
- Women's PGA C'ship: T46: 2007
- U.S. Women's Open: 57th: 2008
- Women's British Open: T7: 2007
- Evian Championship: DNP

Achievements and awards
- Swedish Golf Tour Order of Merit winner: 2003
Medal record
European Golf Team Championships
Gold medal – first place	2018 Gleneagles	Women's team

Linda Maria Wessberg (born 13 June 1980) is a Swedish professional golfer who has played on the LPGA Tour and on the Ladies European Tour, where she has three victories. She represented Europe at the 2007 Solheim Cup.

== Early life and amateur career ==
Wessberg was born in Gothenburg and as a junior was attached to Delsjö Golf Club, to later join Hills Golf Club. In 2001 she won the Swedish Junior Matchplay Championship, and was part of the winning Swedish National team at the 2001 European Ladies' Team Championship in Galicia, Spain.

She spent four years at Oklahoma State University and majored in General Business and minored in Economics. Playing on the Oklahoma State Cowgirls golf team she won the Road Runner Invitational, and finished sixth individually in the 2003 NCAA National Championship.

== Professional career ==
Wessberg turned professional after graduating in June 2003 and joined the Swedish Golf Tour, where she was Player of the Year after winning the Ladies Finnish Open and the Swedish Matchplay Championship. In 2004 she won the Swedish PGA Championship and the tour championship, the Telia Ladies Finale.

=== LET and Solheim Cup ===
Wessberg joined the Ladies European Tour (LET) in 2004. She was runner-up at the Ladies Open of Portugal, three strokes behind Cecilia Ekelundh, and T3 at the Open de France Dames, to finish ninth on Order of Merit and close runner-up to Minea Blomqvist for the LET Rookie of the Year title.

In 2005, Wessberg was runner-up at the Open de España Femenino, before securing her first LET title at the 2006 Wales Ladies Championship of Europe at Machynys Peninsula G&CC. She defeated Laura Davies by one stroke, winning with a birdie at the 72nd hole.

In 2007, she was runner-up at the Ladies English Open and claimed her second LET victory at the 2007 Vediorbis Open de France Dames in Arras, northern France, where she carded a final-round 65 in heavy rain to finish a shot ahead of Trish Johnson.

Wessberg was a captain's pick for the 2007 European Solheim Cup team, where she defeated Cristie Kerr in the singles and recorded a 75% points win rate.

=== LPGA Tour ===
Wessberg joined the LPGA Tour with conditional status in 2007 and played in 13 tournaments. She recorded three top-10s, including a T7 in the 2007 Women's British Open at St Andrews, and finished the season ranked 65th in earnings.

In 2008, she competed in 22 events with her best finishes being T8 at both the LPGA Corning Classic and Kapalua LPGA Classic. She finished 75th on the Money List.

=== Ladies European Tour ===
Wessberg earned her third LET title at the 2009 UNIQA Ladies Golf Open in Austria, defeating England's Laura Davies at the second sudden-death playoff hole at Golfclub Föhrenwald in Wiener Neustadt. After this win, she returned to play in Europe full time.

In 2010, she was 23rd on the Money List and in 2011 she ended the season ranked 14th on the Money List, which was her third-best career season, after third place finishes at both the UNIQA Ladies Golf Open and the Raiffeisenbank Prague Golf Masters. In 2012, she recorded a T4 at the UNIQA Ladies Golf Open and T7 at the World Ladies Championship in China. In 2013, her best results were T4s at the UniCredit Ladies German Open and Sanya Ladies Open in China, two strokes behind winners Charley Hull and Lee-Anne Pace, respectively.

In 2015, Wessberg played only in five tournaments and took some time out due to the arrival of her first child. When she returned in 2016 she was runner-up at the Ladies Scottish Open at Dundonald Links, and finished the season 13th on the Order of Merit. She also won the Ladies Norwegian Open, an event on the LET Access Series.

Wessberg won a gold medal for Sweden in the 2018 European Golf Team Championships together with Cajsa Persson, after they beat the French team in the final at Gleneagles.

In 2022, Wessberg made a hole-in-one at the Hero Women's Indian Open, to lead the tournament with a seven-under 65 after the opening round. She finished T12.

== Personal life ==
Wessberg was introduced to her life partner, former professional ice-hockey player Peter Sällqvist, by Carin Koch in 2008. She gave birth to their daughter Sigrid in 2015.

== Amateur wins ==
- 2001 Swedish Junior Matchplay Championship

== Professional wins (8) ==
=== Ladies European Tour wins (3) ===
No.	Date	Tournament	Winning score	To par	Margin of victory	Runner-up
1	20 Aug 2006	Wales Ladies Championship of Europe	67-67-69-71=274	−14	1 stroke	(England) Laura Davies
2	24 Jun 2007	Vediorbis Open de France Dames	70-68-74-65=277	−11	1 stroke	(England) Trish Johnson
3	13 Sep 2009	UNIQA Ladies Golf Open	70-68-70-71=279	−9	Playoff	(England) Laura Davies

=== LET Access Series wins (1) ===
No.	Date	Tournament	Winning score	To par	Margin of victory	Runner-up
1	20 Aug 2016	Ladies Norwegian Open	69-70-64=203	−13	3 strokes	(Sweden) Jenny Haglund

=== Swedish Golf Tour (4) ===
No.	Date	Tournament	Winning score	To par	Margin of victory	Runner(s)-up
1	15 Jun 2003	Felix Finnish Ladies Open	72-73-71=216	E	2 strokes	(Finland) Jenni Kuosa (Finland) Hanna-Leena Ronkainen (a)
2	28 Jun 2003	SM Match				(Sweden) Anna Berg
3	28 Aug 2004	Skandia PGA Open	66-72-69=207	−3	1 stroke	(Sweden) Helena Svensson
4	19 Sep 2004	Telia Ladies Finale	75-70-67=212	−7	1 stroke	(Denmark) Mianne Bagger

== Team appearances ==
Amateur

- European Ladies' Team Championship (representing Sweden): 2001 (winners)

Professional

- Solheim Cup (representing Europe): 2007
- The Queens (representing Europe): 2016
- European Championships (representing Sweden): 2018 (winner – women's team)

=== Solheim Cup record ===
Year	Total matches	Total W–L–H	Singles W–L–H	Foursomes W–L–H	Fourballs W–L–H	Points won	Points %
Career	2	1–0–1	1–0–0	0–0–0	0–0–1	1.5	75%
2007	2	1–0–1	1–0–0 def C. Kerr		0–0–1 halved w/M. Hjorth	1.5	75%
