= Rejmes Ladies Open =

Tournament information
- Location: Norrköping, Sweden
- Established: 2000
- Courses: Vadstena Golf Club; Norrköping Golf Club; Bråviken Golf Club
- Par: 72
- Tour: Swedish Golf Tour
- Format: 54-hole stroke play
- Prize fund: SEK 200,000
- Final year: 2012

Tournament record score
- Aggregate: 211 Anna Becker, Helena Callahan, Åsa Gottmo, Jacqueline Hedwall, Sanna Johansson, Cecilie Lundgreen, Marianne Skarpnord, Josefine Sundh, Anna Tybring, Lotta Wahlin, Johanna Westerberg
- To par: −8 Anna Becker, Åsa Gottmo

Final champion
- (Sweden) Josefine Sundh

The Rejmes Ladies Open was a women's professional golf tournament on the Swedish Golf Tour, played between 2000 and 2012 near Norrköping. It was always held in Östergötland County, Sweden.

== History ==
Tournament sponsor was initially Tage Rejmes Bil, a local Volvo dealer. Lotta Wahlin from nearby Linköping won the tournament two successive years.

In 2008, as part of the tour's major overhaul in conjunction with the introduction of the SAS Masters Tour, the tournament doubled its purse and was renamed the VW Söderbergs Ladies Masters, after the new sponsor Söderbergs, a local Volkswagen dealer.

Notably, future LPGA Tour players Anna Nordqvist, Daniela Holmqvist and Camilla Lennarth all secured victories in the tournament as amateurs.

== Winners ==
Swedish Golf Tour (PGA Championship)	2010
Swedish Golf Tour (Regular)	2000–09, 2011–12

Year	Venue	Winner	Score	Margin of victory	Runner(s)-up	Prize fund (SEK)	Ref
VW Söderbergs Ladies Masters
2012	Bråviken	(Sweden) Josefine Sundh	211 (–5)	1 stroke	(Sweden) Helena Callahan	200,000	
2011	Bråviken	(Sweden) Camilla Lennarth (a)	216 (E)	Playoff	(Norway) Cecilie Lundgreen (Sweden) Madelene Sagström	200,000	
2010	Bråviken	(Sweden) Johanna Westerberg	211 (–5)	Playoff	(Sweden) Jacqueline Hedwall (a) (Sweden) Sanna Johansson (Norway) Cecilie Lundgreen (Sweden) Anna Tybring	250,000	
2009	Bråviken	(Sweden) Daniela Holmqvist (a)	213 (–3)	2 strokes	(Sweden) Sanna Johansson (Slovakia) Zuzana Kamasova	200,000	
2008	Bråviken	(Sweden) Sanna Johansson	216 (E)	1 stroke	(Sweden) Johanna Lundberg	300,000	
Rejmes Ladies Open
2007	Bråviken	(Switzerland) Florence Lüscher	292 (+4)	Playoff	(Slovenia) Zuzana Kamasová	150,000	
2006	Bråviken	(Sweden) Lotta Wahlin	211 (–5)	1 stroke	(Norway) Marianne Skarpnord	150,000	
2005	Bråviken	(Sweden) Lotta Wahlin	212 (–2)	3 strokes	(Sweden) Mikaela Bäckstedt (Sweden) Caroline Larsson	150,000	
2004	Bråviken	(Sweden) Anna Nordqvist (a)	217 (+1)	Playoff	(Sweden) Nina Reis	150,000	
2003	Norrköping	(Sweden) Maria Bodén	139 (–7)	2 strokes	(Sweden) Nina Reis	150,000	
2002	Norrköping	(Sweden) Anna Becker	211 (–8)	Playoff	(Sweden) Åsa Gottmo	150,000	
2000: No tournament
Vadstena Ladies Open
2000	Vadstena	(Sweden) Susanne Westling	213 (E)	2 strokes	(Sweden) Anna Corderfeldt	150,000	
