= Josephine Janson =

Swedish golfer (born 1991)

Personal information
- Nationality: Sweden
- Born: 16 September 1991 (age 35) Halmstad, Sweden

Career
- Sport: Golf
- College: Oklahoma State University
- Turned professional: 2013
- Former tours: Ladies European Tour; LET Access Series; Swedish Golf Tour
- Professional wins: 2

Josephine Janson (born 16 September 1991) is a retired Swedish professional golfer who played on the Ladies European Tour. She won the 2008 European Girls' Team and the 2011 European Ladies' Team championships, and the Borås Ladies Open on the 2016 LET Access Series.

== Career ==
Janson played for the National Team. She won the 2008 European Girls' Team Championship at Murcar Links Golf Club in Scotland with Louise Larsson, Amanda Sträng and Johanna Tillström, and was runner-up behind Ireland at the 2009 event in Finland with Emma Nilsson, Emma Lundström and Johanna Tillström. In 2011 she won the European Ladies' Team Championship at Murhof Golf Club in Austria together with Nathalie Månsson, Amanda Sträng, Johanna Tillström, Madelene Sagström and Daniela Holmqvist.

In 2007, she won the Swedish Junior Strokeplay Championship and finished fourth individually at the European Young Masters.

Janson played college golf with the Oklahoma State Cowgirls golf team at Oklahoma State University between 2010 and 2012, before finishing tied for fourth at Q-school to get her card for the 2014 Ladies European Tour.

In 2013, Jansson was runner-up at the A6 Ladies Open on the Swedish Golf Tour, behind Nanna Koerstz Madsen. She recorded a wire-to-wire win at the Borås Ladies Open on the 2016 LET Access Series for her first professional title. She captured her second title, the SGT Tourfinal Åhus KGK ProAm, on the 2017 Swedish Golf Tour.

== Amateur wins ==
- 2004 Bankboken Cup (F-13)
- 2005 FSB Cup (F-14)
- 2006 Skandia Tour Riks #1 - Göteborg, Norberg Open
- 2007 Halland District Championship, Swedish Junior Strokeplay Championship, Wendels Junior Open
- 2009 Skandia Tour Elit Flickor #7

== Professional wins (2) ==
=== LET Access Series wins (1) ===
No.	Date	Tournament	Winning score	To par	Margin of victory	Runner-up	Ref
1	19 Jun 2016	Borås Ladies Open^	69-68-73=210	−6	1 stroke	(Hungary) Csilla Lajtai-Rozsa	

^Co-sanctioned with the Swedish Golf Tour

=== Swedish Golf Tour wins (2) ===
No.	Date	Tournament	Winning score	To par	Margin of victory	Runner-up	Ref
1	19 Jun 2016	Borås Ladies Open^	69-68-73=210	−6	1 stroke	(Hungary) Csilla Lajtai-Rozsa	
1	14 Oct 2017	SGT Tourfinal Åhus KGK ProAm	78-70-72=220	+4	2 strokes	(Sweden) Johanna Gustavsson (Sweden) Sarah Nilsson	

^Co-sanctioned with the LET Access Series

== Team appearances ==
Amateur

- European Young Masters (representing Sweden): 2006, 2007
- European Girls' Team Championship (representing Sweden): 2008 (winners), 2009
- European Ladies' Team Championship (representing Sweden): 2011 (winners), 2013
