= 2003 Swedish Golf Tour (women) =

18th season of the Swedish Golf Tour (women)

2003 Swedish Golf Tour (women) season
- Duration: May 2003 – September 2003
- Number of official events: 12
- Most wins: 2 (tie): (Sweden) Maria Bodén (Sweden) Linda Wessberg
- Order of Merit: (Sweden) Linda Wessberg

The 2003 Swedish Golf Tour, known as the Telia Tour for sponsorship reasons, was the 18th season of the Swedish Golf Tour, a series of professional golf tournaments for women held in Sweden and Finland.

Linda Wessberg and Maria Bodén each won two events and Wessberg narrowly won the Order of Merit ahead of Nina Reis.

== Schedule ==
The season consisted of 12 tournaments played between May and September, where one event was held in Finland.

Date	Tournament	Location	Winner	Score	Margin of victory	Runner(s)-up	Purse (SEK)	Note	Ref
13 May	Telia Grand Opening	Fågelbro	(Sweden) Nina Reis	144 (+4)	1 stroke	(Sweden) Minea Blomqvist (a)	100,000	Pro-am	
18 May	Trummenäs Ladies Open	Trummenäs	(Sweden) Maria Ringdahl (a)	221 (+5)	Playoff	(Sweden) Minea Blomqvist (a)	200,000		
27 May	CA Ladies Trophy	Brollsta/Ullna	(Finland) Minea Blomqvist (a)	146 (+2)	3 strokes	(Sweden) Emelie Leijon (Sweden) Erica Steen	100,000		
6 Jun	Kalmar Ladies Open	Kalmar	(Sweden) Åsa Gottmo	209 (−7)	9 strokes	(Sweden) Eva Bjärvall (Finland) Pia Koivuranta (Finland) Jenni Kuosa	150,000		
15 Jun	Felix Finnish Ladies Open	Aura	(Sweden) Linda Wessberg	216		(Finland) Jenni Kuosa (Finland) Hanna-Leena Ronkainen (a)	175,000		
28 Jun	SM Match	Kevinge	(Sweden) Linda Wessberg	1up		(Sweden) Anna Berg	150,000		
5 Jul	Rejmes Ladies Open	Norrköping	(Sweden) Maria Bodén	139 (−7)	2 strokes	(Sweden) Nina Reis	150,000		
26 Jul	Gefle Ladies Open	Gävle	(Sweden) Maria Bodén	207 (−9)	3 strokes	(Sweden) Cecilia Ekelundh (Sweden) Erica Steen	200,000		
2 Aug	Öijared Ladies Open	Öijared	(Sweden) Sofia Renell	206 (−10)	5 strokes	(Sweden) Maria Bodén (Sweden) Sara Odelius (a)	200,000		
22 Aug	Swedish International	Upsala	(Sweden) Emelie Svenningsson	215 (−1)	1 stroke	(Sweden) Mikaela Parmlid	150,000		
30 Aug	Skandia PGA Open	Falsterbo	(Sweden) Filippa Helmersson	208 (−5)	6 strokes	(Sweden) Åsa Gottmo	360,000		
7 Sep	Telia Ladies Finale	Bro-Bålsta	(Sweden) Anna Becker	215 (−4)	Playoff	(Sweden) Lisa Hed	300,000		

National Championship tournaments

== Order of Merit ==
Rank	Player	Score
1	(Sweden) Linda Wessberg	1,584
2	(Sweden) Nina Reis	1,576
3	(Sweden) Maria Bodén	1,200
4	(Sweden) Åsa Gottmo	1,106
5	(Sweden) Emelie Svenningsson	1,052
6	(Finland) Jenni Kuosa	1,027
7	(Sweden) Lisa Hed	948
8	(Sweden) Anna Gertsson	945
9	(Sweden) Anna Berg	829
10	(Sweden) Anna Becker	825

== See also ==
- 2003 Swedish Golf Tour (men's tour)
