= Csicsi Rózsa =

Slovenian professional golfer

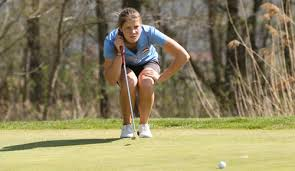

Personal information
- Full name: Csilla Lajtai-Rózsa
- Nationality: Hungary
- Born: 14 January 1997 (age 29) Budapest, Hungary

Career
- Sport: Golf
- Turned professional: 2014
- Current tour: Symetra Tour (joined 2017)
- Former tours: Ladies European Tour (joined 2015); LET Access Series

Achievements and awards
- Hungarian Golfer of the Year: 2014, 2020

Csicsi Rózsa (born 14 January 1997) is a Hungarian professional golfer. In 2014, she became the first Hungarian to earn membership of the Ladies European Tour (LET), and was named Hungarian Golfer of the Year.

== Early life and amateur career ==
Rózsa was born in Budapest and was first introduced to golf at the age of eight by her uncle Peter Lajtai, a TV commentator, who took her to a golf show in Hungary called "Golfstar Gala". She started to play at 11 when the nine hole Highland Golf Club opened just 10 minutes from her home. After only a year of practice, she set her sights on becoming a pro.

A member of the Hungarian National Team, she represented Hungary at the European Young Masters, finishing 7th in 2012 and 4th in 2013. In 2013, she was a member of the winning Junior Vagliano Trophy team representing the Continent of Europe. In 2013, she was also Hungarian Junior champion and Hungarian Amateur Open champion, and defended both titles in 2014. While visiting her coach Tim Burnett in Jacksonville, Florida, she won the FCWT at Champions Gate. In 2014, she represented Hungary in the European Girls' Team Championship.

In 2014, Rózsa had a handicap of +2.7 and joined the LET Access Series as its first representative from Hungary. In line with the LET, there is an age requirement of 18 years to join LETAS, however a special exemption was made for 17-year-old Rózsa on account of her outstanding amateur record.

== Professional career ==
In late 2014, Rózsa illustrated her talent by securing a card at the final stage of LET Qualifying School. She finished tied for 17th place, earning playing rights on the 2015 Ladies European Tour, as the first LET member from Hungary. For this achievement, she was named Hungarian Golfer of the Year.

She made little impact on the LET but was runner-up in two LETAS events in 2016, at the Borås Ladies Open one stroke behind Josephine Janson, and at the Azores Ladies Open five strokes behind Jenny Haglund.

Rózsa joined the Symetra Tour and was a rookie in 2017. She made the cut in 15 of the 22 events and recorded two top-10 finishes, including a season-best T4 finish at the PHC Classic.

In 2020, she was again made Hungarian Golfer of the Year.

== Amateur wins ==
- 2012 Hungarian Junior Open
- 2013 Hungarian Junior Open, Hungarian Ladies Amateur, Harder German Junior Girls, FCWT at Champions Gate
- 2014 Hungarian Junior Open, Hungarian Ladies Amateur, RB German Junior

== Team appearances ==
Amateur

- European Young Masters (representing Hungary): 2012, 2013
- Junior Vagliano Trophy (representing the Continent of Europe): 2013 (winners)
- European Girls' Team Championship (representing Hungary): 2014
