= Hope Rugo =

American oncologist

Hope S. Rugo is a professor of medicine and the director of the breast oncology clinical trials program at the University of California at San Francisco, and an investigator of SPORE (Specialized Program of Research Excellence in Breast Cancer) in the Bay Area.

In 2014, Rugo chaired the advisory panel of OncLive's "Giants of Cancer Care" award program.

Rugo was the lead investigator on research that investigated the hair-preserving properties of cold caps for patients undergoing chemotherapy.

Along with her studies, she is also an active clinician who gives lectures internationally.

In 2025, Rugo was named division chief of breast medical oncology for City of Hope, a cancer treatment and research group.

Dr. Rugo served for the American Society of Clinical Oncology's Education Committee on the editorial board.

She also served as the co-chair of the Emerging Toxicities Study Group for MASCC (Multinational Association for Supportive Care in Cancer).

== Education ==
- Tufts University, BS, 1979, Chemistry
- University of Pennsylvania, MD, 1984, Medicine
- University of California San Francisco, 1987, Resident, Internal Medicine
- University of California San Francisco, 1990, fellow, Hematology/Oncology
- Stanford University, 1988–90, postdoctoral fellowship, Microbiology/Immunology
- DNAX Institute of Cellular and Molecular Biology, 1989–90, visiting scientist, immunology

== Awards ==
- College summa cum laude, Phi Beta Kappa, Sigma Xi; Victor Prather Prize for Excellence in Scientific Research; Durkee Scholarship for promise and achievement in the field of chemistry; Max Tishler Prize Scholarship for outstanding achievement in the sciences
- Medical School Henry Luce Scholar in the Philippines; Certificate of Commendation, Philadelphia Area Project on Occupational Safety and Health; National Health Service Corps Scholarship; Janet M. Glasgow Memorial Achievement Citation
- Fellowships Awarded Bank of America Giannini Foundation Research Fellowship
- Research Breast Cancer Award, European Society for Medical Oncology (ESMO)

== See also ==
- Nancy McDaniel, former patient
