= Helena Alterby =

Swedish golfer and administrator

Personal information
- Full name: Helena Alterby Nordström
- Nationality: Sweden
- Born: 3 March 1978 (age 48) Gothenburg, Sweden

Career
- Sport: Golf
- Turned professional: 2002
- Former tour: Ladies European Tour (2004–2007)
- Professional wins: 2

Best results in LPGA major championships
- Chevron Championship: DNP
- Women's PGA C'ship: DNP
- U.S. Women's Open: DNP
- Women's British Open: T67: 2006
- Evian Championship: DNP

Achievements and awards
- Honorary Member of the Ladies European Tour: 2016

Helena Alterby Nordström (born 3 March 1978) is a former Swedish professional golfer and golf administrator. She served as Ladies European Tour Chairman 2013–2016 and helped stage six Solheim Cups.

== Career ==
Having turned professional as a golfer in 2002, Alterby was inspired to join the Ladies European Tour after attending the 2003 Solheim Cup at Barsebäck Golf & Country Club in her native Sweden.

She earned full membership of the Ladies European Tour by placing fourteenth at Q-School in 2003, and played on tour for four years from 2004. Alterby won the 2004 South African Ladies Masters but had limited success in Europe. She led the 2005 Algarve Ladies Open of Portugal after the first round, finishing fifth, and enjoyed further top-ten finishes at the 2005 Arras Open de France Dames and again at the Ladies Open of Portugal in 2006. She made the cut at the 2006 Women's British Open.

Alterby was appointed Director of Ladies European Tour Limited on 28 October 2006 and served until 11 December 2016. She became Vice Chairman in 2010, before holding the role of Chairman from September 2013, taking over after Karen Lunn who retired to become the executive-director of the Australian Ladies Professional Golf Tour. She was succeeded by Helen Alfredsson as Player President and Mark Lichtenhein as Chairman. During her 10-year service, Alterby was directly involved in the staging of five Solheim Cups, as well as the bidding process for the 2019 Solheim Cup.

As she stepped down as Ladies European Tour Chairman of the Board of Directors, Alterby was presented with an Honorary Membership of the LET in recognition of her commitment and service to the organisation, becoming only the second Honorary Member of the LET, joining Louise Solheim who was bestowed Honorary Membership in September 2011 in recognition of her contribution to the tour as a founder of the Solheim Cup.

== Professional wins (2) ==
=== Sunshine Ladies Tour (1) ===
- 2004 South African Ladies Masters

=== Telia Tour (1) ===
- 2004 CA Ladies Trophy

Business positions
Preceded by n/a	Director of Ladies European Tour; 2006–2016	Succeeded by Helen Alfredsson
Preceded by n/a	Vice Chairman of Ladies European Tour; 2010–2013	Succeeded by n/a
Preceded by Karen Lunn	Chairman of Ladies European Tour; 2013–2016	Succeeded by Mark Lichtenhein
