= Eric Carlberg (golfer) =

Swedish professional golfer

Personal information
- Nationality: Sweden
- Born: 28 August 1974 (age 52) Köping, Sweden
- Height: 1.68 m (5 ft 6 in)
- Weight: 69 kg (152 lb; 10.9 st)

Career
- Sport: Golf
- Turned professional: 1994
- Former tour: Challenge Tour
- Professional wins: 4

Number of wins by tour
- Challenge Tour: 2
- Other: 2

Eric Carlberg (born 28 August 1974) is a Swedish professional golfer.

Carlberg won the Ramlösa Open on the Challenge Tour in 1994 as an amateur. He played on the Challenge Tour 1995–2002. He missed his European Tour card by one shot at the Challenge Tour Grand Final in 1999 and failed again at the qualifying school, but made an immediate impact by leading from start to finish to win the Challenge de España, the opening event of the 2000 Challenge Tour season.

Carlberg played 14 events on the European Tour where his best performance was a tie for fourth at the 1999 Moroccan Open.

== Professional wins (4) ==
=== Challenge Tour wins (2) ===
No.	Date	Tournament	Winning score	Margin of victory	Runner-up
1	29 May 1994	Ramlösa Open (as an amateur)	−7 (67-73-69-68=277)	2 strokes	(Sweden) Mats Hallberg
2	20 Feb 2000	Challenge de España	−17 (64-66-69-72=271)	5 strokes	(Spain) Carlos Rodiles

=== Nordic Golf League wins (2) ===
No.	Date	Tournament	Winning score	Margin of victory	Runner-up
1	11 May 2004	Telia Grand Opening	−10 (64-64=128)	2 strokes	(Sweden) Linus Pettersson (a)
2	9 Jul 2004	Saltsjöbadskannan	−2 (70-70-71=211)	Playoff	(Sweden) Linus Pettersson (a)

== Team appearances ==
Amateur

- Eisenhower Trophy (representing Sweden): 1994
