= Zuzana Mašínová =

Czech professional golfer

Personal information
- Nationality: Czech Republic
- Born: 5 November 1979 (age 46) Prague, Czech Republic
- Height: 163 cm (5 ft 4 in)

Career
- Sport: Golf
- Turned professional: 2006
- Former tours: Ladies European Tour; Swedish Golf Tour
- Professional wins: 2

Achievements and awards
- Czech Female Amateur Player of the Year: 2004, 2005, 2006
- Czech Female Professional Player of the Year: 2008, 2009
- Swedish Golf Tour Order of Merit: 2008

Zuzana Mašínová (born 5 November 1979) is a Czech professional golfer, named Czech Player of the Year five times. In 2008 she won the Swedish Golf Tour Order of Merit to earn a full 2009 Ladies European Tour card.

== Career ==
Mašínová had a successful amateur career and won the Czech National Championship and Greece International Amateur several times. She represented her country at the Espirito Santo Trophy twice, in 2004 in Puerto Rico with Petra Kvídová and Lucie Sarochová, and in 2006 in South Africa with Katerina Ruzickova and Jessica Korda.

She was named Czech Amateur Player of the Year three times in a row, 2004, 2005 and 2006. She achieved the same success in 2008 and 2009, when she was named Czech Professional Player of the Year.

Mašínová turned professional in late 2006 after finishing 36th at the LET Q-School, earning limited status. She played in seven LET events in 2007 but made no cuts. She competed on the Swedish Golf Tour in Scandinavia in 2007 and 2008, which was the official feeder tour to the LET at the time.

She played in 12 tournaments on the 2008 Swedish Golf Tour and recorded two victories and three runner-up finishes at the IT-Arkitekterna Ladies Open, Kungsängen Queens Masters and Swedish PGA Championship. She won the 2008 Order of Merit, thereby earning her full LET card for 2009.

Mašínová made six cuts on the LET in 2009 and retired from tour at the end of the season.

== Amateur wins ==
- 2004 Czech National Championship, Greece International Amateur
- 2005 Czech International Amateur
- 2006 Czech National Championship, Greece International Amateur

== Professional wins (2) ==
=== Swedish Golf Tour wins (2) ===
No.	Date	Tournament	Winning score	To par	Margin of victory	Runner(s)-up
1	13 Jul 2008	Felix Finnish Ladies Open	73-69-65=207	–6	6 strokes	(England) Sarah Heath (Sweden) Lotta Lovén
2	4 Oct 2008	Volkswagen Kallfors Open	70-68-77=215	–1	2 strokes	(Sweden) Karin Börjeskog

== Team appearances ==
Amateur

- Espirito Santo Trophy (representing Czech Republic): 2004, 2006
- European Ladies' Team Championship (representing Czech Republic): 2005
