= Women's Golf Coaches Association =

Golf organization

Women’s Golf Coaches Association
- Abbreviation: WGCA
- Formation: 1983
- Purpose: To promote women's intercollegiate golf
- Headquarters: Coral Springs, Florida
- Board President: Angie Ravaioli-Larkin
- Website: community.wgcagolf.com/home
- Formerly called: National Golf Coaches Association

The Women's Golf Coaches Association (WGCA), formerly known as the National Golf Coaches Association, is an organization formed in 1983 to promote women's intercollegiate golf. The vision of WGCA since its inception has been "to encourage the playing of intercollegiate golf for women in correlation with a general objective of education and in accordance with the highest tradition of intercollegiate competition".

== Membership and governance ==
The WGCA has a membership of over 400 coaches of NCAA Division I, II, III, NAIA, and NJCAA collegiate programs.

WHCA is governed by a 13-member Board of Directors and the headquarters is located in Coral Springs, Florida.

== Awards ==
The WGCA gives out many awards, including:

- NGCA National Coach of the Year
- NGCA Assistant Coach of the Year
- Gladys Palmer Meritorious Service Award
- NGCA Founders Award
- PING Player of the Year
- NGCA Freshman of the Year
- Edith Cummings Munson Golf Award
- Dinah Shore Trophy Award
- Golfstat Cup Award
- Kim Moore Spirit Award

In addition, they also recognize All-Americans as well as scholar-athlete All-Americans and a panel of 33 coaches in the country vote for the rankings for DI, II & III each week.

== Hall of Fame ==
Formed in 1986, the WGCA Hall of Fame consists of a Coaches Hall of Fame and a Players Hall of Fame.

Coaches Hall of Fame Inductees
Judi Pavon	2024	University of Tennessee
Mike Morrow	2023	Kent State University
Greg Allen	2022	Vanderbilt University/University of Arizona
Robbie Davis	2020	Florida Southern College
Julie Garner	2019	Rollins College
Stacy Slobodnik-Stoll	2018	Michigan State University
Nancy McDaniel	2017	University of California Berkeley
Laurie Gibbs	2016	Pepperdine University
Melissa Luellen	2015	Arizona State University
Mary Lou Mulflur	2014	University of Washington
Devon Brouse	2013	Purdue University
Carrie Forsyth	2012	UCLA
Andrea Gaston	2011	USC
Karen Bahnsen	2009	Louisiana State University
Kim Evans	2008	Auburn University
Edean Ihlanfeldt	2007	University of Washington
John Crooks	2006	Campbell University
Therese Hession	2005	The Ohio State University
Renee Mack Baumgartner	2004	University of Oregon/USC
Julie Manning	2003	Iowa State University
Lela Cannon	2002	University of Miami
Dan Brooks	2001	Duke University
Dianne Dailey	2001	Wake Forest University
Paul Brilliant	2000	New Mexico State University
Beans Kelly	2000	University of Georgia
Cathy Torchiana	1999	USC
Tim Bladwin	1998	Stanford University
Sam Carmichael	1998	Indiana University
Ann Davidson	1998	College of William & Mary
Bettie Lou Evans	1997	University of Kentucky
Kim Haddow	1997	University of Arizona
Paula Smith	1997	University of Illinois
Joan Gearhart	1996	Iowa State University
Gary Howard	1996	Brigham Young University
Diane Thomason	1995	University of Iowa
Mic Potter	1995	Furman University/University of Alabama
Ann Pitts	1995	Oklahoma State University
Linda Vollstedt	1994	Arizona State University
Mark Gale	1993	San Jose State University
Dot Gunnells	1993	University of North Carolina
Joanne Lusk	1993	University of Arizona
Barbara Smith	1992	Longwood College
Jackie Steinmann	1989	UCLA
Millie Stanley	1989	Long Beach State University
Mary Fossum	1988	Michigan State University
Pat Park	1988	Lamar University
Dale McNamara	1988	Tulsa University
Pat Weiss	1987	University of Texas
Earl Stewart	1987	Southern Methodist University
Mary Cave	1987	San Diego State University
Mary Dagraedt	1986	Florida International University
Ann Casey Johnstone	1986	Stephens College
Gladys Palmer	1986	
Liz Murphey	1986	University of Georgia
Mimi Ryan	1986	University of Florida

== See also ==
- NCAA Division I Women's Golf Championship
