= Lill-Kristin Sæther =

Norwegian professional golfer (born 1983)

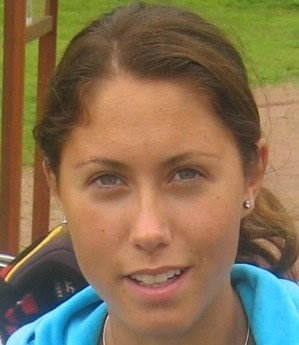

Personal information
- Full name: Lill Kristin Klingen Sæther
- Nationality: Norway
- Born: 7 October 1983 (age 43) Lørenskog, Norway

Career
- Sport: Golf
- Turned professional: 2004
- Former tours: Ladies European Tour (joined 2005); Swedish Golf Tour (joined 2004)

Lill-Kristin Sæther (born 7 October 1983) is a retired Norwegian professional golfer. She played on the Ladies European Tour from 2005 to 2009, and was runner-up at the 2008 Scandinavian TPC hosted by Annika.

== Career ==
Sæther represented Losby Golf and Country Club near Oslo. She appeared for Norway alongside Marianne Skarpnord and Camilla Guriby Hilland at the 2002 Espirito Santo Trophy at Saujana Golf and Country Club in Kuala Lumpur, Malaysia, where the team finished in the top half.

Sæther turned professional in January 2004 and joined the Swedish Golf Tour, where she was runner-up at the Gefle Ladies Open.

In 2005, she joined the Ladies European Tour after finishing 8th at LET Q-School. In 2008, she tied for 6th at the Open de España Femenino and was a runner-up at the Scandinavian TPC hosted by Annika at Frösåker G&CC outside Stockholm.

Sæther retired in 2009 after five seasons on the LET and started a career with If.

== Amateur wins ==
- 2017 Finans-NM

== Team appearances ==
Amateur

- Espirito Santo Trophy (representing Norway): 2002
