= 2008 Swedish Golf Tour (women) =

23rd season of the Swedish Golf Tour (women)

2008 Swedish Golf Tour (women) season
- Duration: May 2008 – October 2008
- Number of official events: 12
- Most wins: 2: (Czech Republic) Zuzana Mašínová (Sweden) Catrin Nilsmark
- Order of Merit: (Czech Republic) Zuzana Mašínová

The 2008 Swedish Golf Tour, known as the SAS Masters Tour for sponsorship reasons, was the 23rd season of the Swedish Golf Tour, a series of professional golf tournaments for women held in Sweden and Finland.

Scandinavian Airlines replaced Telia Company as the tour's main sponsor and minimum purse for tournaments were raised to SEK 300,000. The sponsorship agreement amounted to a total of SEK 55 million and included the men's SAS Masters (formerly Scandinavian Masters) and women's SAS Masters in Norway.

The Swedish International, held since 1962 and included on the tour since its inception in 1986, was discontinued.

Teenage twins Jacqueline and Caroline Hedwall finished top at the inaugural SAS Masters Tour event. Catrin Nilsmark and Czech Republic's Zuzana Mašínová both won two events, and Mašínová won the Order of Merit thanks to three runner-up finishes.

25 places at the LET event Göteborg Masters was reserved for players of the tour.

== Schedule ==
The season consisted of 12 tournaments played between May and October, where one event was held in Finland, and one was a Ladies European Tour event.

Date	Tournament	Location	Winner	Score	Margin of victory	Runner(s)-up	Purse (SEK)	Note	Ref
10 May	Telenor Masters	Barsebäck/St Ibb	(Sweden) Caroline Hedwall (a)	216 (+2)	2 strokes	(Sweden) Jacqueline Hedwall (a)	300,000		
6 Jun	IT-Arkitekterna Ladies Open	Botkyrka	(Sweden) Catrin Nilsmark	219 (+3)	2 strokes	(Sweden) Josefin Leijon (Czech Republic) Zuzana Mašínová	300,000		
5 Jul	Kungsängen Queens Masters	Kungsängen	(Sweden) Anna Becker	216 (+6)	3 strokes	(Sweden) Antonella Cvitan (Czech Republic) Zuzana Mašínová (Finland) Jenni Kuosa	300,000		
13 Jul	Felix Finnish Ladies Open	Aura, Finland	(Czech Republic) Zuzana Mašínová	207 (−6)	6 strokes	(England) Sarah Heath (Sweden) Lotta Lovén	300,000		
1 Aug	Smådalarö Gård Open	Smådalarö Gård	(Sweden) Johanna Lundberg			(Sweden) Josefin Leijon	300,000	(Note: Stableford tournament.)	
22 Aug	SM Match	Örebro	(Sweden) Anna Nordqvist (a)			(Sweden) Lisa Hed	300,000		
30 Aug	PGA Open	Norrtelje	(Sweden) Catrin Nilsmark	219 (+3)	1 stroke	(Czech Republic) Zuzana Mašínová	300,000		
7 Sep	VW Söderberg Ladies Masters	Bråviken	(Sweden) Sanna Johansson	216 (E)	1 stroke	(Sweden) Johanna Lundberg	300,000		
13 Sep	Svensk Biogas Masters	Landeryd	(Sweden) Johanna Westerberg	211 (−5)	7 strokes	(Sweden) Antonella Cvitan (England) Emma Weeks	300,000		
21 Sep	Göteborg Masters	Lycke	(France) Gwladys Nocera	259 (−29)	11 strokes	(Sweden) Nina Reis	€250,000	LET event	
26 Sep	Mölle Masters	Mölle	(England) Emma Weeks	211 (+1)	Playoff	(Sweden) Eva Bjärvall	300,000		
4 Oct	Volkswagen Open	Kallfors	(Czech Republic) Zuzana Mašínová	215 (−1)	2 strokes	(Sweden) Karin Börjeskog	300,000		

Swedish PGA Championship
Swedish Matchplay Championship

== Order of Merit ==
An official feeder tour for the Ladies European Tour, the top two finishers in the Order of Merit earned LET cards for 2009. The two qualifiers received Exemption Category 7, ahead of the 30 Q-School graduates with Category 8A. Johanna Lundberg received the second card, as Catrin Nilsmark was already exempt in Category 2, after winning an LET major, the Evian Masters.

Rank	Player
1	(Czech Republic) Zuzana Mašínová
2	(Sweden) Catrin Nilsmark
3	(Sweden) Johanna Lundberg

== See also ==
- 2008 Swedish Golf Tour (men's tour)
