= Maria Bodén =

Swedish golfer

Personal information
- Nationality: Sweden
- Born: 3 January 1978 (age 48) Härnösand, Sweden
- Height: 167 cm (5 ft 6 in)

Career
- Sport: Golf
- College: Oklahoma State
- Turned professional: 2001
- Former tour: Ladies European Tour (joined 2002)
- Professional wins: 8

Best results in LPGA major championships
- Chevron Championship: DNP
- Women's PGA C'ship: DNP
- U.S. Women's Open: DNP
- Women's British Open: CUT: 2002, 2008
- Evian Championship: DNP

Achievements and awards
- Big 12 Freshman of the Year: 1998
- Big 12 Player of the Year: 1999, 2000, 2001
- Swedish Golf Tour Order of Merit winner: 2001

Maria Bodén (born 3 January 1978) is a Swedish professional golfer who played on the Ladies European Tour between 2002 and 2010. She won the 2005 South African Women's Open and was runner-up at the 2008 Ladies Scottish Open.

== Career ==
As an amateur, Bodén was Swedish Junior National champion twice, and a member of the Swedish national team 1995–2000, representing her country in two World Amateur Team Championships, the 1998 and 2000 Espirito Santo Trophy, finishing fourth at the latter.

Bodén played golf at Oklahoma State where she qualified individually for the NCAA Women's Golf Championship three years running. A first-team All-American in 1999 and 2000, and three times Big-12 player of the year, she joined a group of only eight Cowgirls to earn at least three All-Big 12 selections, including Linnea Johansson, Caroline Hedwall, Pernilla Lindberg, Karin Sjödin and Linda Wessberg. Graduating with a degree in Anatomy and Physiology she was an Academic All-American, Oklahoma State Sportswoman of the Year in 2001, and won eight times representing her school.

Bodén turned professional in 2001 and won the Telia Tour Order of Merit, before joining the Ladies European Tour where she finished third at the 2002 Ladies Irish Open, one stroke away from a playoff with Iben Tinning and Suzann Pettersen. She was the Swedish Matchplay champion in 2004 and the following year won the South African Women's Open by a convincing seven shots at the Royal Johannesburg & Kensington Golf Club.

Bodén's seventh LET season in 2008 was her most successful, she posted three top-10s and finished 32nd on the money list. Her best career finish was at the 2008 Ladies Scottish Open, where she shared the lead with Gwladys Nocera after the first round and finished runner-up. She was forced to retire early from tour in 2011 due to injury.

== Amateur wins ==
- 1998 Swedish Junior Matchplay Championship
- 1999 Swedish Junior Matchplay Championship

== Professional wins (8) ==
=== Sunshine Ladies Tour (1) ===
- 2005 Acer SA Women's Open

=== Swedish Golf Tour (7) ===
- 2001 (2) Albatross Ladies Open, Skandia PGA Open
- 2003 (2) Rejmes Ladies Open, Gefle Ladies Open
- 2004 (2) SM Match, Swedish International
- 2011 (1) Helsingborg Ladies Open

== Team appearances ==
Amateur

- European Ladies' Team Championship (representing Sweden): 1999
- Espirito Santo Trophy (representing Sweden): 1998, 2000
