= Minea Blomqvist =

Finnish professional golfer (born 1985)

Minea Blomqvist-Kakko
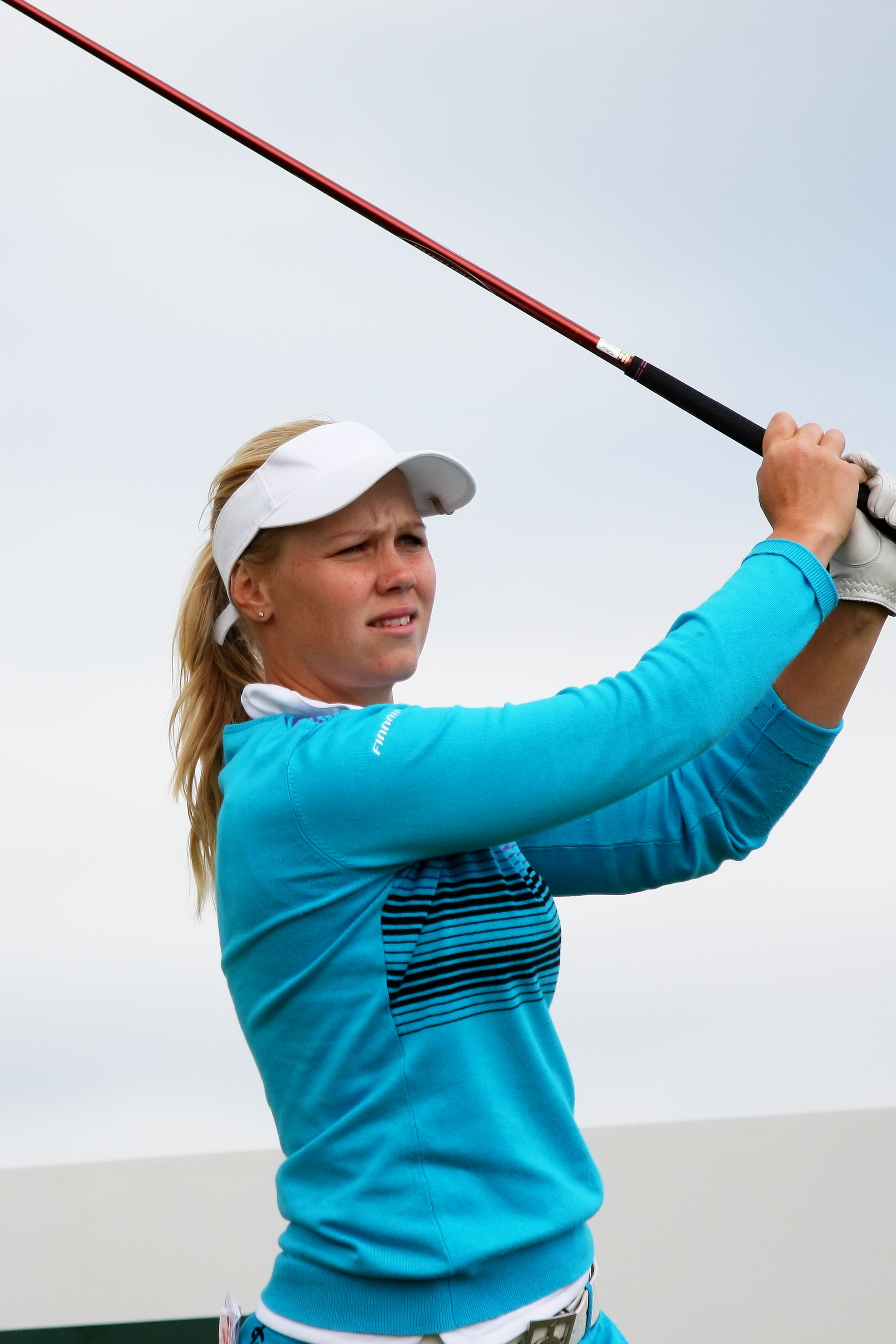
- Blomqvist at the 2013 Women's British Open

Personal information
- Nickname: Minni
- Nationality: Finland
- Born: 12 March 1985 (age 41) Espoo, Finland
- Height: 5 ft 4 in (1.63 m)
- Spouse: Roope Kakko
- Children: Elmo

Career
- Sport: Golf
- Turned professional: 2003
- Current tours: Ladies European Tour (joined 2004); LPGA Tour (joined 2006)
- Professional wins: 7

Number of wins by tour
- Ladies European Tour: 2
- Other: 5

Best results in LPGA major championships
- Chevron Championship: T47: 2008
- Women's PGA C'ship: T25: 2006
- U.S. Women's Open: T27: 2008
- Women's British Open: T8: 2004
- Evian Championship: DNP

Achievements and awards
- Ladies European Tour Rookie of the Year: 2004
- Nedbank Women's Golf Tour Order of Merit: 2004

Minea "Minni" Blomqvist, (born 12 March 1985 in Espoo, Finland) is a professional golfer who played on the U.S.-based LPGA Tour in the early 2000s. She won twice on the Ladies European Tour.

== Amateur career ==
Blomqvist was a member of the Finnish National Ladies Team from 2001 to 2003 and played in the 2002 Espirito Santo Trophy World Amateur Golf Team Championships. She was a two-time member of the European PING Junior Solheim Cup Team in 2002 and 2003 winning all her matches in the winning 2003 side and she represented Europe in the 2003 Vagliano Trophy.

She played as an amateur on the Swedish Golf Tour four times in 2000 and 2001 missing the cut each time. In 2002, she played in three Swedish Golf Tour events and recorded two top twenty finishes plus a win at the Sparbanken Ladies Open. In 2003, she played in five Swedish Golf Tour tournaments, recorded two runner up finishes plus a win at the CA Ladies Trophy, and was named Telia Tour Player of the Year.

== Professional career ==
Blomqvist turned professional late in 2003 and in 2004 claimed her maiden victory in only her second tournament as a professional at the Pam Golding Ladies International on the Nedbank Women's Golf Tour in South Africa following this up with a win in the Telkom Women's Classic a week later. These results meant she finished top of the Nedbank Women's Golf Tour Order of Merit for 2004.

Having finished 36th at the Ladies European Tour Qualifying School in 2003, Blomqvist had conditional status for 2004 when making her Ladies European Tour debut in Tenerife where she finished fourth. She won her maiden LET tournament later in the year in Hungary and gained her first top ten finish in a major at the Women's British Open during which she shot a record low score of 62. She had five other top twenty LET finishes in 2004 together with another win at the Öijared Ladies Open on the Telia Tour and was the LET Rookie of the Year.

At the start of 2005 she teamed with Riikka Hakkarainen to represent Finland at the inaugural Women's World Cup of Golf. On the Ladies European Tour she posted 11 top-20 finishes, including back-to-back runner-up finishes at the Ladies English Open and the OTP Bank Ladies Central European Open and earned non-exempt status for the 2006 LPGA Tour season by tying for 34th at the LPGA Final Qualifying Tournament.

At the start of 2006 she again teamed with Riikka Hakkarainen to represent Finland at the Women's World Cup of Golf. She concentrated on playing on the LPGA tour in 2006 ending the season with a best finish of 24th and 102nd on the money list.

In 2008 Blomqvist added another success to her résumé. By winning the Finnair Masters she became the first Finn to triumph in that event. Another notable achievement was finishing tied as a runner-up at the rain-shortened Scandinavian TPC hosted by Annika, where she played her last round in 63 strokes. On LPGA Tour her best finish was 3rd place at the Safeway International.

== Personal life ==
Blomqvist gave birth to her son Elmo 31 March 2010. The father is Roope Kakko, which she married on New Year's Eve 2011.

== Awards and honors ==
- In 2004, Blomqvist earned the Ladies European Tour Rookie of the Year award.
- In 2004, she earned the Order of Merit for the Nedbank Women's Golf Tour's, a tour in South Africa.

== Professional wins (7) ==
=== Ladies European Tour (2) ===
No.	Date	Tournament	Winning score	Margin of victory	Runner(s)-up
1	18 Jul 2004	Ladies Central European Open	−14 (62-67-70=199)	4 strokes	(New Zealand) Gina Scott (Sweden) Emma Zackrisson
2	29 Aug 2008	Finnair Masters	−11 (69-68-65=202)	1 stroke	(Finland) Ursula Wikström

=== Swedish Golf Tour (3) ===
No.	Date	Tournament	Winning score	Margin of victory	Runner(s)-up
1	7 Sep 2002	Sparbanken Ladies Open (as an amateur)	−2 (72-70-72=214)	1 stroke	(Sweden) Sara Eklund
2	27 May 2003	CA Ladies Trophy (as an amateur)	+2 (72-74=146)	3 strokes	(Sweden) Emelie Leijon (Sweden) Erica Steen
3	4 Sep 2004	Öijared Ladies Open	−6 (74-65-71=210)	1 stroke	(Finland) Ursula Wikström

^ Shortened to 36 holes due to weather

=== Nedbank Women's Golf Tour (2) ===
No.	Date	Tournament	Winning score	Margin of victory	Runner-up
1	25 Mar 2004	Pam Golding Ladies International	–3 (71-73-69=213)	1 stroke	(South Africa) Ashleigh Simon (a)
2	1 Apr 2004	Telkom Women's Classic	–12 (73-63-68=204)	7 strokes	(South Africa) Ashleigh Simon (a)

== Team appearances ==
Amateur

- European Girls' Team Championship (representing Finland): 2000, 2001
- Espirito Santo Trophy (representing Finland): 2002
- European Ladies' Team Championship (representing Finland): 2003
- Junior Solheim Cup (representing Europe): 2002, 2003 (winners)

Professional

- World Cup (representing Finland): 2005, 2006
