= Emma Zackrisson =

Swedish professional golfer (born 1979)

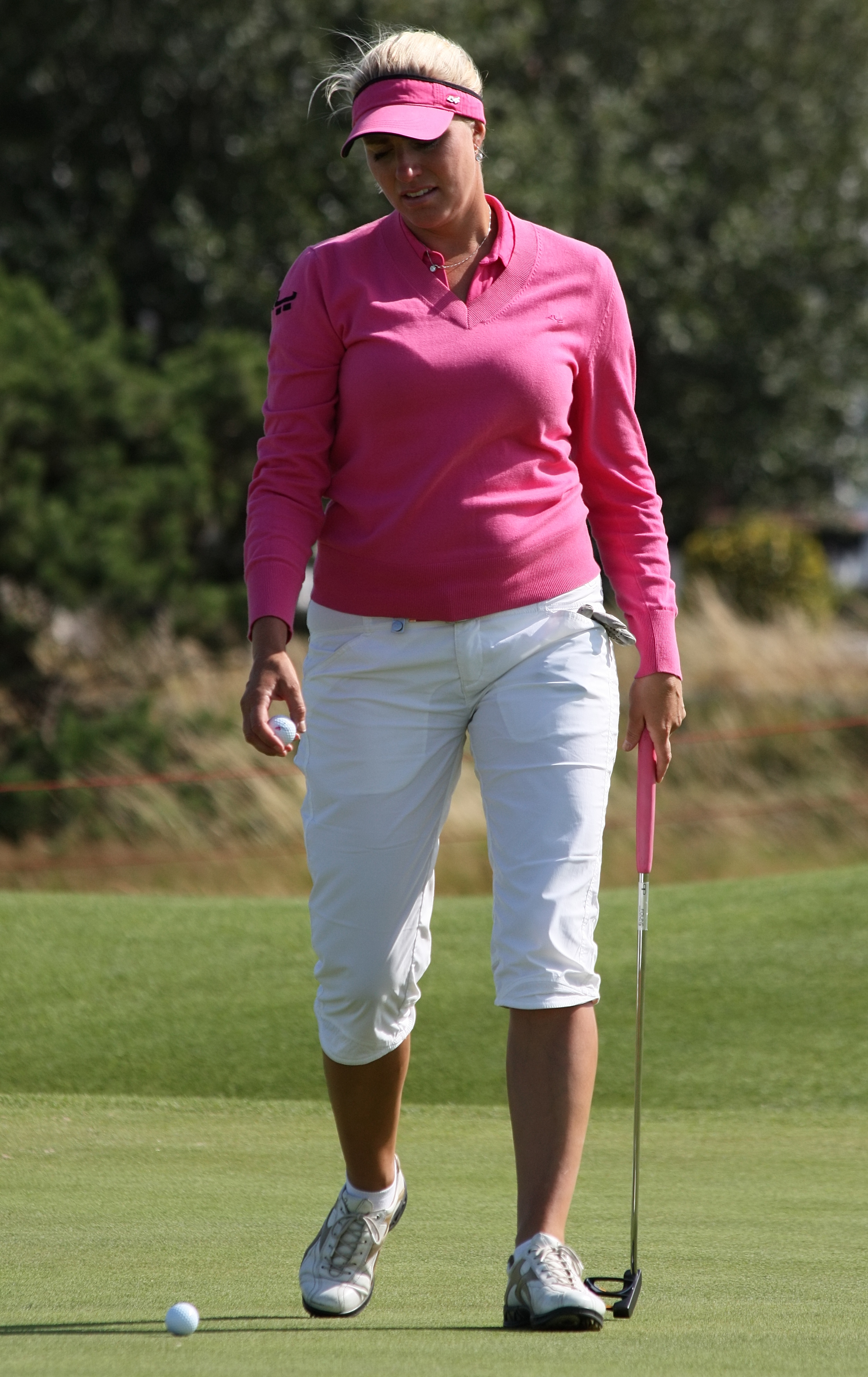
- Zackrisson in 2009

Personal information
- Full name: Hanna Emma Erika Zackrisson
- Nationality: Sweden
- Born: 26 January 1979 (age 47) Holmsund, Umeå, Sweden

Career
- Sport: Golf
- College: Oklahoma State University
- Turned professional: 2002
- Former tours: Ladies European Tour (2003–2011); Swedish Golf Tour
- Professional wins: 1

Number of wins by tour
- Ladies European Tour: 1

Best results in LPGA major championships
- Chevron Championship: DNP
- Women's PGA C'ship: DNP
- U.S. Women's Open: DNP
- Women's British Open: T60: 2009

Achievements and awards
- Edith Cummings Munson Golf Award: 2002

Emma Zackrisson (born 26 January 1979) is a former Swedish professional golfer. She played on the Ladies European Tour 2003–2011. She won the 2008 Open de España Femenino.

== Amateur career ==
Zackrisson attended Oklahoma State University 1998–2002 where she played with the Oklahoma State Cowgirls golf team and majored in broadcast journalism and public relations. She won twice as a senior, including the Big 12 Championship.

In 2002, she received the Edith Cummings Munson Golf Award, an award presented by the National Golf Coaches Association to the student-athlete who is both an All-American Scholar and an All-American who excels in academics. In 2002, she graduated.

== Professional career ==
Zackrisson turned professional after she graduated in 2002. She finished 16th at the LET Qualifying School to secure a card for the 2003 season. In 2004, she finished runner-up at the Ladies Central European Open in Hungary, four strokes behind Minea Blomqvist. In 2006, she finished 5th at the Acer SA Women's Open in Durban.

The 2008 year was her best season, she won the season opener Open de España Femenino and finished top-6 at the SAS Masters in Norway, UNIQA Ladies Golf Open in Austria, and the Madrid Ladies Masters, to finish 18th in the rankings.

In 2009, she secured the second largest prize check in her career with a 4th place at the Deutsche Bank Ladies Swiss Open, and made the cut at the 2009 Women's British Open at Royal Lytham & St Annes Golf Club.

After nine seasons on the Ladies European Tour she retired from tour in 2011 at age 32.

== Awards and honors ==
In 2002, she earned the Edith Cummings Munson Golf Award, an honor bestowed by the National Golf Coaches Association to one of the top female golfers who excels in academics.

== Amateur wins ==
- 2002 Rainbow Wahine Invitational, Big 12 Championship

== Professional wins (1) ==
=== Ladies European Tour (1) ===
No.	Date	Tournament	Winning score	To par	Margin of victory	Runners-up
1	20 Apr 2008	Open de España Femenino	72-67-71-71=281	−7	4 strokes	(Australia) Nikki Garrett (Italy) Diana Luna (Australia) Joanne Mills

== Results in LPGA majors ==
Tournament	2008	2009
Women's British Open	CUT	T60

Note: The only major Zackrisson played in was the Women's British Open.

Did not play

CUT = missed the half-way cut
T = tied
