= Daniela Holmqvist =

Swedish professional golfer (born 1988)

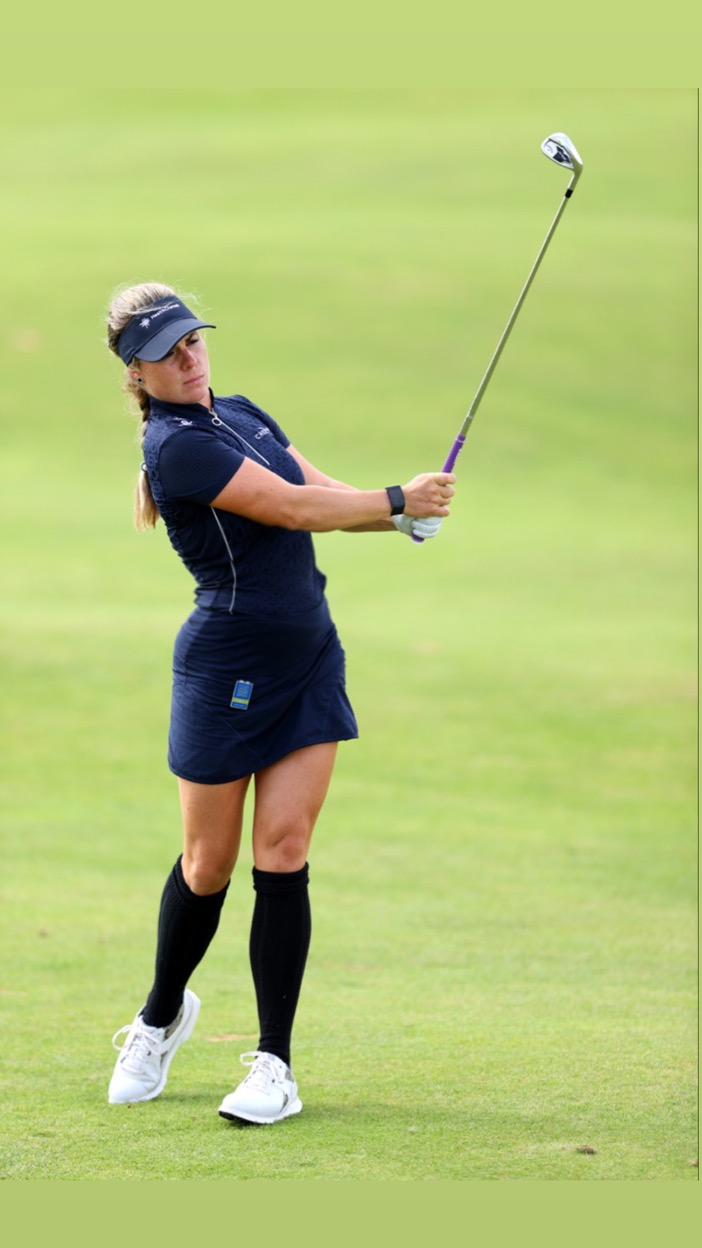
- Holmqvist at Gainbridge LPGA

Personal information
- Full name: Daniela Yvonne Holmqvist
- Nationality: Sweden
- Born: 3 May 1988 (age 38) Bern, Switzerland
- Height: 1.66 m (5 ft 5 in)

Career
- Sport: Golf
- College: Tulane University; University of California, Berkeley
- Turned professional: 2012
- Current tour: LPGA Tour (joined 2016)
- Former tours: Ladies European Tour (2013–2014); Epson Tour (joined 2015)
- Professional wins: 3

Number of wins by tour
- WPGA Tour of Australasia: 1
- Epson Tour: 1
- Other: 1

Best results in LPGA major championships
- Chevron Championship: T50: 2021
- Women's PGA C'ship: T27: 2021
- U.S. Women's Open: CUT: 2018
- Women's British Open: T29: 2020
- Evian Championship: T65: 2018

Achievements and awards
- Conference USA Freshman of the year: 2009

Daniela Yvonne Holmqvist (born 3 May 1988) is a Swedish professional golfer. She was in contention at the 2020 Women's British Open, holding the lead as the only player to finish under-par after 36 holes.

== Personal life ==
Holmqvist was born in Switzerland to Yvonne and Hans Holmqvist, a Swedish professional footballer with 27 appearances for the national team, who played for Young Boys in Bern at the time.

== Amateur career ==
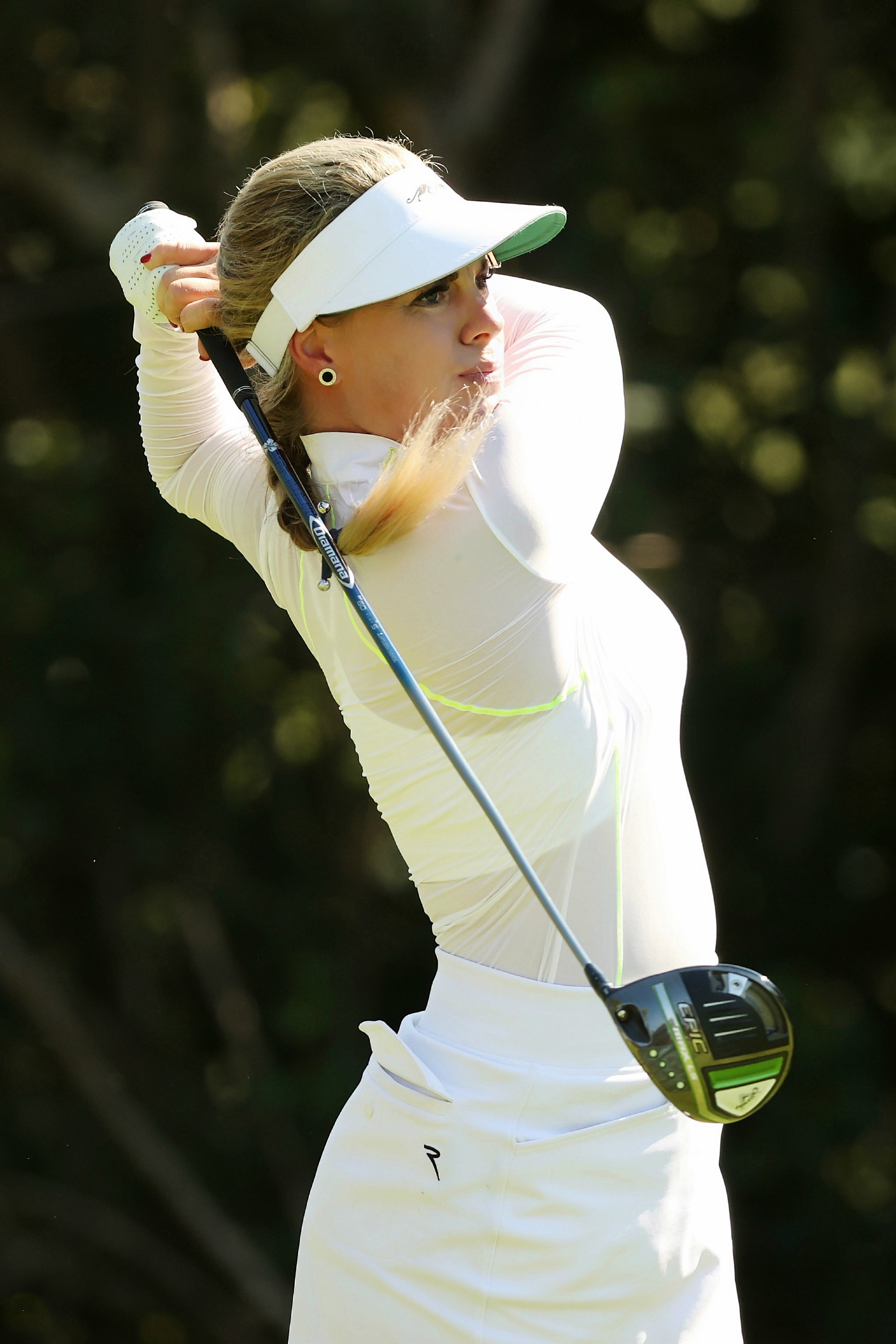

After finishing high school in Stockholm she moved to the United States and played college golf at Tulane University, where she was awarded Conference USA Freshman of the year. She also won the Conference USA Championship with the team and individually by a record of 10 strokes. As a sophomore she transferred to University of California, Berkeley and the California Golden Bears, where she helped the Golden Bears win the 2012 PAC-12 Championship and was awarded All-American honors.

Holmqvist was the highest ranked Swedish amateur, and member of the 2011 and 2012 Swedish National Team. She won the 2011 European Ladies' Team Championship, where she had a perfect 3–0 record. She represented Sweden at the 2012 Espirito Santo Trophy with a team that included Madelene Sagström.

== Professional career ==
Holmqvist turned professional in 2012 was runner-up at the Ladies Norwegian Challenge. Playing on the Ladies European Tour in 2013 and 2014, she first received international headlines in her rookie season when what tournament officials believe was a redback spider, relative of the famed black widow, nipped her leg during a qualification round for the Women's Australian Open at Royal Canberra Golf Club. Holmqvist swatted the spider away, used a golf tee to pierce her skin and squeeze out the venom, and finished her round. In 2014, she won her first professional tournament, the Mount Broughton Classic in New South Wales, Australia.

Holmqvist joined the 2015 Symetra Tour and secured her 2016 LPGA Tour membership by finishing fifth on the money list after winning the Island Resort Championship and recording five other top-10 finishes, including runner-up at the Sioux Falls GreatLIFE Challenge.

In 2018 she finished a career-best 75th on the LPGA Money List, but was sidelined for most of the 2019 season due to a back injury. Holmqvist returned to form for the 2020 Women's British Open at Royal Troon, where she held a one-shot lead heading into the weekend, as the only player to finish under-par after 36 holes.

In 2021, she finished 115th in the rankings and spent 2022 mainly on the Epson Tour, where she was runner-up at the Carlisle Arizona Women's Golf Classic. She finished T21 at LPGA Q-Series to return to the LPGA Tour in 2023, where she led the ShopRite LPGA Classic by one stroke heading into the final day, and ultimately tied for 4th, a career-best.

== Amateur wins ==
- 2006 Richard S Johnson Junior Open
- 2008 Skyways Open
- 2009 Conference USA Championship, Chrysantemumbålen
- 2012 Avenue Spring Break Classic, Stockhlom GDF Championship

== Professional wins (3) ==
=== Symetra Tour (1) ===
| No. | Date | Tournament | Winning score | Margin of victory | Runner-up |
|---|---|---|---|---|---|
| 1 | 28 Jun 2015 | Island Resort Championship | −10 (67-69-70=206) | 1 stroke | (Canada) Samantha Richdale |

=== ALPG Tour (1) ===
| No. | Date | Tournament | Winning score | Margin of victory | Runner-up |
|---|---|---|---|---|---|
| 1 | 18 Jan 2014 | Mount Broughton Classic | −10 (67-67=134) | 2 strokes | (Australia) Sarah Kemp |

=== Swedish Golf Tour (1) ===
| No. | Date | Tournament | Winning score | Margin of victory | Runners-up |
|---|---|---|---|---|---|
| 1 | 9 Aug 2009 | VW Söderberg Ladies Masters (as an amateur) | −3 (72-69-72=134) | 2 strokes | (Sweden) Sanna Johansson (Slovenia) Zuzana Kamasová |

== Results in LPGA majors ==
Results not in chronological order.

| Tournament | 2013 | 2014 | 2015 | 2016 | 2017 | 2018 | 2019 | 2020 | 2021 | 2022 | 2023 | 2024 | 2025 | 2026 |
|---|---|---|---|---|---|---|---|---|---|---|---|---|---|---|
| Chevron Championship | | | | | | | | WD | T50 | | | | | |
| U.S. Women's Open | | | | | | CUT | | | | | | | | |
| Women's PGA Championship | | | | | T59 | T28 | WD | | T27 | | CUT | | | CUT |
| The Evian Championship | | | | | | | | NT | CUT | | CUT | | | |
| Women's British Open | CUT | | | | | | | T29 | | | | | | |

Did not play

CUT = missed the half-way cut
WD = withdrew
NT = no tournament
T = tied

== Team appearances ==
Amateur

- European Ladies' Team Championship (representing Sweden): 2011 (winners)
- Espirito Santo Trophy (representing Sweden): 2012
