= Ursula Wikström =

Finnish professional golfer

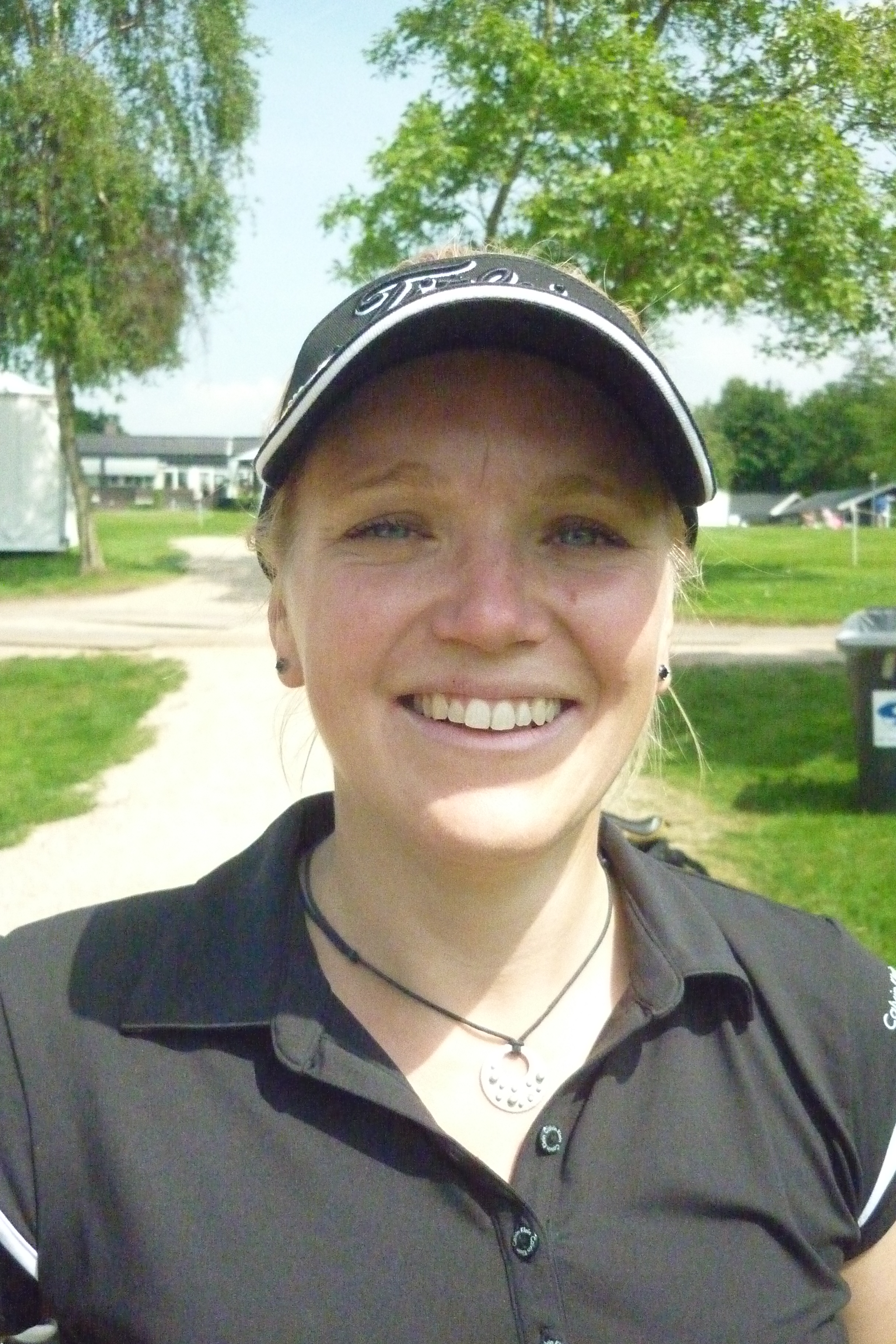

Personal information
- Nationality: Finland
- Born: 3 July 1980 (age 46) Espoo, Finland
- Height: 1.66 m (5 ft 5 in)

Career
- Sport: Golf
- College: New Mexico State
- Turned professional: 2003
- Current tour: Ladies European Tour (joined 2004)
- Former tours: LET Access Series; Swedish Golf Tour
- Professional wins: 1

Best results in LPGA major championships
- Chevron Championship: DNP
- Women's PGA C'ship: DNP
- U.S. Women's Open: DNP
- Women's British Open: T46: 2009
- Evian Championship: DNP

Ursula Wikström (née Tuutti) (born 3 July 1980) is a Finnish professional golfer who plays on the Ladies European Tour. She represented Finland at the 2016 Rio Olympics, 2024 Paris Olympics and won the 2017 Ladies Finnish Open.

== Amateur career ==
Wikström was Finnish Strokeplay Champion twice. She played college golf with the New Mexico State Aggies and won six college tournaments.

She played on the Swedish Golf Tour between 2000 and 2003 and was runner-up at the 2001 Felix Finnish Ladies Open.

== Professional career ==
Wikström turned professional in 2003 and joined the Ladies European Tour in 2004. Between 2005 and 2022, she was runner-up 10 times.

In 2005 and 2008, she finished second at the Ladies Finnish Masters, the second time behind compatriot Minea Blomqvist. She was also runner-up at the 2009 Open de France Dames, 2012 Turkish Airlines Ladies Open as well as the 2012 and 2015 Dutch Ladies Open. In 2021, she was runner-up at the Ladies Finnish Open and the Ladies Italian Open. In 2022, she was runner-up at the Women's Irish Open and captained a team that lost a playoff at the Aramco Team Series – London.

Wikström won the 2017 Ladies Finnish Open, an LET Access Series event, and was runner-up at the event in 2018 and 2019. On the Swedish Golf Tour she was runner-up at the 2004 Öijared Ladies Open and at the Körunda Ladies Open and Felix Finnish Ladies Open in 2011.

In 2019, she had a consistent year with eight top-20 finishes, including a season-best result of fourth in the Estrella Damm Mediterranean Ladies Open, and finished 17th on the Order of Merit.

Wikström qualified for the 2016 Summer Olympics where she finished in a tie for 44th, and finished 57th at the 2024 Summer Olympics.

== Personal life ==
She married Mika Wikström, who works for the Finnish Golf Federation, in early 2005 and changed her name from Tuutti to Wikström.

== Professional wins (1) ==
=== LET Access Series wins (1) ===
No.	Date	Tournament	Winning score	To par	Margin of victory	Runners-up
1	23 May 2017	EVLI Ladies Finnish Open	71-67-66=204	−12	2 strokes	(Finland) Sanna Nuutinen (Finland) Charlotte Thompson

== Playoff record ==
Ladies European Tour playoff record (0–1)

No.	Year	Tournament	Opponents	Result
1	2022	KPMG Women's Irish Open	(Czech Republic) Klára Spilková (Denmark) Nicole Broch Estrup	Spilková won with birdie on first extra hole

== Results in LPGA majors ==
Note: Wikström only played in the Women's British Open.

Tournament	2004	2005	2006	2007	2008	2009	2010	2011	2012	2013	2014
Women's British Open	CUT		T61			T46			CUT		

Tournament	2015	2016	2017	2018	2019	2020	2021	2022	2023	2024
Women's British Open	CUT		CUT	CUT		CUT	CUT	CUT		82

Did not play

CUT = missed the half-way cut
T = tied

== Team appearances ==
Amateur

- European Ladies' Team Championship (representing Finland): 1999, 2001, 2003

Professional

- European Championships (representing Finland): 2018
