= 2023 Swedish Golf Tour (women) =

38th season of the Swedish Golf Tour (women)

2023 Swedish Golf Tour (women) season
- Duration: June 2023 – August 2023
- Number of official events: 7 (1 cancelled)
- Order of Merit winner: (England) Gemma Clews

The 2023 Ahlsell Nordic Golf Tour was the 38th season of the Swedish Golf Tour, a series of professional golf tournaments for women held in Sweden and neighboring countries.

Following the cancellation of the Swedish Matchplay Championship all tournaments also featured on the 2023 LET Access Series (LETAS).

== Schedule ==
The season consisted of 7 tournaments played between June and August, where one event was held in Denmark.

Date	Tournament	Venue	Location	Winner	Purse	Tour (Note: Several tournaments are hosted under co-sanctioning agreement with the LET Access Series (LETAS))	Ref
1 Jul	Västerås Ladies Open	Fullerö Golf Club	Sweden	(Denmark) Puk Lyng Thomsen	€40,000	LETAS	
6 Jul	Capio Ögon Trophy	Upsala Golf Club	Sweden	(Denmark) Sofie Kibsgaard Nielsen	€40,000	LETAS	
~~14 Jul~~	Swedish Matchplay Championship	Skövde Golf Club	Sweden	Cancelled	SEK 250,000		
2 Aug	Smørum Ladies Open	Smørum Golf Club	Denmark	(England) Gemma Clews	€60,000	LETAS	
11 Aug	Big Green Egg Swedish Open	Varberg Golf Club	Sweden	(England) Emily Price	€40,000	LETAS	
19 Aug	PGA Championship Gothenburg	Kungsbacka Golf Club	Sweden	(Switzerland) Chiara Tamburlini	€40,000	LETAS	
25 Aug	Ahlsell Final	Elisefarm Golf Club	Sweden	(India) Avani Prashanth (a)	€40,000	LETAS	

Swedish PGA Championship
Swedish Matchplay Championship

== Ranking ==
Rank	Player	Events	Result
1	(England) Gemma Clews	4	117,020
2	(Denmark) Puk Lyng Thomsen	4	98,628
3	(Switzerland) Chiara Tamburlini	4	88,748
4	(Denmark) Sofie Kibsgaard Nielsen	3	88,200
5	(Sweden) Corinne Vidén	5	75,559

== See also ==
- 2023 Ladies European Tour
