= 2024 Swedish Golf Tour (women) =

39th season of the Swedish Golf Tour (women)

2024 Swedish Golf Tour (women) season
- Duration: June 2024 – August 2024
- Number of official events: 5
- Most wins: (Sweden) Kajsa Arwefjäll (2)
- Order of Merit winner: (Sweden) Kajsa Arwefjäll

The 2024 Ahlsell Nordic Golf Tour was the 39th season of the Swedish Golf Tour, a series of professional golf tournaments for women held in Sweden and neighboring countries.

== Schedule ==
The season consisted of 5 tournaments played between June and August, where one event was held in Denmark.

Key

Regular events
National Championships

Date	Tournament	Venue	Location	Winner	Purse	Tour (Note: Tournaments were co-sanctioned by the 2024 LET Access Series (LETAS), forming its Scandinavian Swing)	Ref
29 Jun	MoreGolf Mastercard Open	Varbergs Golf Club	Sweden	(Sweden) Kajsa Arwefjäll	€40,000	LETAS	
6 Jul	PGA Championship Gothenburg	Albatross Golf Club	Sweden	(Denmark) Natacha Host Husted	€40,000	LETAS	
4 Aug	Smørum Ladies Open	Smørum Golf Club	Denmark	(England) Gemma Clews	€60,000	LETAS	
9 Aug	Ahlsell Trophy	Gränna Golf Club	Sweden	(Germany) Patricia Isabel Schmidt	€40,000	LETAS	
16 Aug	Destination Gotland Ladies Open	Gumbalde Resort	Sweden	(Sweden) Kajsa Arwefjäll	€40,000	LETAS	

== Ranking ==
Rank	Player	Events	Result
1	(Sweden) Kajsa Arwefjäll	5	15,652
2	(Sweden) Andrea Lignell	5	11,971
3	(Denmark) Natacha Host Husted	5	10,998
4	(England) Gemma Clews	1	9,600
5	(Sweden) Anna Magnusson	4	6,509

== See also ==
- 2024 Ladies European Tour
