= Get Golfing Women's Golf Championship =

Tournament information
- Location: Welwyn Garden City, England
- Established: 2023
- Course: Mill Green Golf Club
- Par: 72
- Tour: LET Access Series
- Format: 54-hole Stroke play
- Prize fund: €80,000
- Month played: July

Tournament record score
- Aggregate: 209 Megan Dennis
- To par: –7 as above

Current champion
- (England) Megan Dennis

Location map
- Location in England Location in Greater Manchester

The Get Golfing Women's Golf Championship is a women's professional golf tournament on the LET Access Series, held in England.

== History ==
Following the success of the WPGA International Challenge and the Rose Ladies Open, another English event was scheduled for Hurlston Hall Golf Club in Ormskirk near Liverpool. The event, scheduled for 1–3 September 2023 and planned to run for three seasons, was later cancelled "due to unforeseen circumstances".

In 2024, the event was staged as the Get Golfing Women's Golf Championship at the organization's The Club at Mill Green in Welwyn Garden City, just north of London, after a three-season deal was struck with GetGolfing. Home player Megan Dennis prevailed over Kajsa Arwefjäll to win the tournament, which featured that season's biggest purse, helping her graduate to the Ladies European Tour. After a one-year hiatus, the event was succeeded on the LETAS schedule in 2026 by the Women's English Open, staged at Manchester Golf Club.

== Winners ==
Year	Winner	Country	Score	Margin of victory	Runner-up	Prize fund (€)	Venue	Ref
Get Golfing Women's Golf Championship
2024	Megan Dennis	England	−7 (71-67-71=209)	2 strokes	(Sweden) Kajsa Arwefjäll	80,000	The Club at Mill Green	
Women's English Masters
2023	Tournament cancelled					65,000	Hurlston Hall Golf Club	

== See also ==
- Pitch 15 Open
