= 2021 Swedish Golf Tour (women) =

36th season of the Swedish Golf Tour (women)

2021 Swedish Golf Tour (women) season
- Duration: August 2021
- Number of official events: 5
- Order of Merit winner: (England) Lily May Humphreys

The 2021 Swedish Golf Tour, branded the Nordic Golf Tour, was the 36th season of the Swedish Golf Tour, a series of professional golf tournaments for women held in Sweden.

The tournaments also featured on the 2021 LET Access Series (LETAS).

== Schedule ==
The schedule had a reduced number of tournaments and was subject to change due to the COVID-19 pandemic.

| Date | Tournament | Venue | Winner | Purse (SEK) | Tour | Ref |
|---|---|---|---|---|---|---|
| 1 Aug | Swedish Matchplay Championship | Johannesberg Golf Club | (Sweden) Sofie Bringner | €40,000 | LETAS | |
| 7 Aug | GolfUppsala Open | GolfUppsala Söderby | (Sweden) Kajsa Arwefjäll (a) | €40,000 | LETAS | |
| 14 Aug | Anna Nordqvist Västerås Open | Västerås Golf Club | (South Korea) Nayeon Eum | €35,000 | LETAS | |
| 19 Aug | Allerum Open | Allerum Golf Club | (Scotland) Gabrielle Macdonald | €40,000 | LETAS | |
| ~~29 May~~; 23 Aug | PGA Championship by Trelleborgs Kommun | Tegelberga Golf Club | (Sweden) Maja Stark | €50,000 | LETAS | |

Swedish PGA Championship
Swedish Matchplay Championship

== Ranking ==
The ranking was called the Road to Skaftö Open, and the top two players Lily May Humphreys and Sofie Bringner received wildcards to the Skaftö Open played 26–29 August on the 2021 Ladies European Tour.

| Rank | Player | Events | Result |
|---|---|---|---|
| 1 | (England) Lily May Humphreys | 4 | 14,400 |
| 2 | (Sweden) Sofie Bringner | 5 | 13,583 |
| 3 | (Scotland) Gabrielle Macdonald | 5 | 9,764 |
| 4 | (Sweden) Maja Stark | 2 | 9,550 |
| 5 | (South Korea) Nayeon Eum | 4 | 8,842 |

== See also ==
- 2021 Ladies European Tour
