= Elsa Svensson =

Swedish professional golfer (born 2003)

Personal information
- Full name: Elsa Christina Svensson
- Nationality: Sweden
- Born: 17 January 2001 (age 25) Mariestad, Sweden
- Height: 5 ft 3 in (1.60 m)

Career
- Sport: Golf
- College: Louisiana State University
- Turned professional: 2026
- Current tour: LET Access Series (joined 2026)
- Professional wins: 2

Elsa Svensson (born 17 January 2001) is a Swedish professional golfer and LET Access Series player. In 2026, she won the Swedish PGA Championship and Iberdrola Calatayud Ladies Open.

== Amateur career ==
Svensson was born in Mariestad and moved to Helsingborg to attend the golf program at Filbornaskolan, where she started to represent Vasatorp Golf Club.

She won a number of titles on the Swedish Junior Tour, including the 2020 Stockholm Amateur, where she holed a 10m putt on the second playoff hole to prevail against Linn Grant. She was runner-up at the 2018 Global Junior Golf Grand Final, held at Mission Inn Resort & Club, a stroke behind Valentina Albertazzi of Italy. She made her Ladies European Tour debut at the 2022 Skaftö Open, where she made the cut.

Svensson was part of the national squad, and her team won bronze at the 2018 European Girls' Team Championship and she finished 4th at the European Ladies' Team Championship alongside Anna Nordfors, Andrea Lignell, Louise Rydqvist, Kajsa Arwefjäll and Ingrid Lindblad.

Svensson attended the Louisiana State University 2021–2026. Playing with the LSU Lady Tigers golf team she was named a WGCA All-American Scholar and to the SEC All-Freshman Team. She sat out the 2022/23 and 2023/24 seasons due to injury, but returned to finished runner-up at the Illini Women's Invitational at Medinah Country Club in 2025.

== Professional career ==
Svensson turned professional after graduating in May 2026 and joined the LET Access Series. In her third start, she won her first professional title at the Swedish PGA Championship. In October, she won the Iberdrola Calatayud Ladies Open in Spain.

== Amateur wins ==
- 2014 Skandia Tour Västergötland #3
- 2016 Skandia Tour Regional #1 Östergötland
- 2017 Skandia Tour Future #3
- 2018 Teen Tour Grand Opening, Onsjö C&B Junior Open
- 2019 Teen Tour Grand Opening, Teen Tour Final
- 2020 Stockholm Amateur, Teen Tour Final

== Professional wins (2) ==
=== LET Access Series (2) ===
No.	Date	Tournament	Winning score	To par	Margin of victory	Runner-up
1	26 Jun 2026	Swedish PGA Championship	67-75-67=209	−7	2 strokes	(Switzerland) Natalie Armbruster
2	16 Oct 2026	Iberdrola Calatayud Ladies Open	68-65-69=202	−14	3 strokes	(Sweden) Johanna Sjursen

== Team appearances ==
Amateur

- European Girls' Team Championship (representing Sweden): 2018, 2019
- Junior Golf World Cup (representing Sweden): 2019
- European Ladies' Team Championship (representing Sweden): 2022
