= Trophée Preven's =

Tournament information
- Location: Bussy-Saint-Georges, Île-de-France, France
- Established: 2010
- Course: Golf de Bussy Guermantes
- Par: 72
- Tour: LET Access Series
- Format: Stroke play
- Prize fund: €25,000
- Month played: October
- Final year: 2011

Final champion
- (Netherlands) Marieke Nivard

Location map
- Location in France

The Trophée Preven's was a golf tournament played at Golf de Bussy Guermantes in Bussy-Saint-Georges near Paris, France. It was included on the LET Access Series in 2010 and 2011.

== History ==
The tournament first appeared on the LET Access Series schedule in 2010, the tour's inaugural season, and remained on the schedule for two consecutive years.

Home player Jade Schaeffer, based at the club using the course as her training ground, won the 2010 tournament ahead of Julie Tvede.

In 2011, Marieke Nivard of the Netherlands won three strokes ahead of a group of five players, including Joanna Klatten, Marjet van der Graaff and Henni Zuël.

== Winners ==
Year	Winner	Score	To Par	Margin of victory	Runner(s)-up
2011	(Netherlands) Marieke Nivard	208	–8	3 strokes	(France) Camille Fallay (France) Elena Giraud (France) Joanna Klatten (Netherlands) Marjet van der Graaff (England) Henni Zuël
2010	(France) Jade Schaeffer	208	–8	3 strokes	(Denmark) Julie Tvede

== See also ==
- Bossey Ladies Championship
