= Pitch 15 Open =

Tournament information
- Location: Hertfordshire, England
- Established: 2011
- Course: Hanbury Manor
- Par: 72
- Tour: LET Access Series
- Format: 54-hole Stroke play
- Prize fund: €50,000
- Month played: July

Tournament record score
- Aggregate: 203 Helen Briem, Hannah Screen
- To par: –13 as above

Current champion
- (Australia) Hannah Reeves

The Pitch15 Open is a women's professional golf tournament on the LET Access Series, held in Hertfordshire, England.

== History ==
Back in 2011, English player Henni Zuël won the LETAS Ladies Open with a par on the first extra hole in a playoff with Ashleigh Simon. My Leander of Sweden won the inaugural Rose Ladies Open, three strokes ahead of Noemí Jiménez Martín of Spain.

The 54-hole stroke play tournament is hosted at The Melbourne Club at Brocket Hall, and was announced in July 2022 as a late addition to the LETAS schedule. At €65,000, it featured the largest prize fund of the season outside of the LETAS Grand Finale. It is the first LETAS event in England since the WPGA International Challenge which ran between 2013 and 2019 at Stoke-by-Nayland, and succeeds the inaugural English tournament on the LET Access Series, played at Hazlemere Golf Club in south Buckinghamshire in 2011.

The tournament was supported by former world number one golfer Justin Rose, who together with wife Kate also launched the Rose Ladies Series in 2020.

In 2026, the title sponsor changed to the Pitch 15 Women's Sports Fund.

== Winners ==
| Year | Winner | Country | Score | Margin of victory | Runner-up | Prize fund (€) | Venue | Ref |
Pitch 15 Open
| 2026 | Hannah Reeves | Australia | −11 (70-67-68=205) | Playoff | (England) Ellen Hume | 50,000 | Hanbury Manor | |
Rose Ladies Open
| 2025 | Emma Falcher | France | −11 (65-71-69=205) | 5 strokes | (England) Gemma Clews | 65,000 | Hanbury Manor | |
| 2024 | Helen Briem | Germany | −13 (68-69-66=203) | Playoff | (England) Hannah Screen | 85,000 | Brocket Hall | |
| 2023 | Chiara Tamburlini | Switzerland | −12 (71-68-65=204) | 2 strokes | (Switzerland) Elena Moosmann | 70,000 | Brocket Hall | |
| 2022 | My Leander | Sweden | −3 (72-73-68=213) | 3 strokes | (Spain) Noemí Jiménez Martín | 65,000 | Brocket Hall | |
2012–2021: No tournament
LETAS Ladies Open
| 2011 | Henni Zuël | England | −4 (65-70-71=206) | Playoff | (South Africa) Ashleigh Simon | 25,000 | Hazlemere | |

== See also ==
- WPGA International Challenge
- Rose Ladies Series
