= Marieke Nivard =

Dutch professional golfer

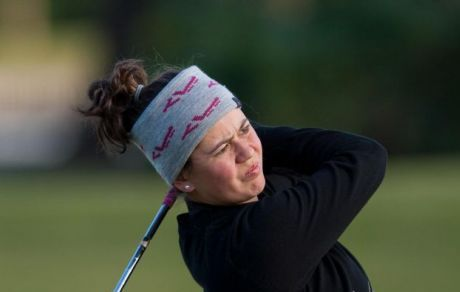

Personal information
- Nationality: Netherlands
- Born: 14 June 1990 (age 36) Stockholm, Sweden

Career
- Sport: Golf
- Turned professional: 2011
- Former tours: Ladies European Tour (2011–2012); LET Access Series
- Professional wins: 2

Achievements and awards
- LET Access Series Order of Merit: 2011

Marieke Nivard (born 14 June 1990) is a professional golfer from the Netherlands who played on the Ladies European Tour. In 2011, she won two LET Access Series tournaments and topped the LETAS Order of Merit.

== Early life and amateur career ==
Nivard was born in Stockholm, Sweden in 1990 and was introduced to golf at age 8 by her father. She enjoyed success as an amateur. She won silver at the 2007 European Girls' Team Championship, losing the final at Oslo Golf Club in Norway to a Swedish team with Jacqueline and Caroline Hedwall.

In 2008, she won both the Duke of York Young Champions Trophy and the German Girls Open. She finished 6th at the European Ladies Amateur Championship and played in the European Ladies Golf Cup, a professional event, with Marjet van der Graaff where they placed 4th. She also played in the European Ladies' Team Championship in Sweden, where the Netherlands won silver after falling in the final to a Swedish team that featured future major winners Anna Nordqvist and Pernilla Lindberg.

She appeared at the Espirito Santo Trophy twice, in 2008 she finished T8 together with Christel Boeljon and Dewi Claire Schreefel, and in 2010 T20 with Myrte Eikenaar and Karlijn Zaanen.

In 2009, she again represented Netherlands at the European Ladies' Team Championship, and had the best individual score at Copa Sotogrande. She reached No. 2 in the EGA ranking and was selected for the continental team in the Vagliano Trophy, where her team prevailed.

== Professional career ==
Nivard turned professional in November 2011, having earned conditional status on the Ladies European Tour at Q-School in December.

In her rookie year, she played in 10 events and made three cuts. She won two titles on the LET Access Series, Trophée Preven's in France and the Azores Ladies Open in Portugal, one stroke ahead of England's Kelly Tidy. She secured the number one spot in the 2011 LET Access Series Order of Merit ahead of Henni Zuël, and earned a full card for the Ladies European Tour.

In 2012, she made five cuts in 14 LET starts, with a best finish of T26 in the Ladies German Open.

== Amateur wins ==
- 2008 Duke of York Young Champions Trophy, German Girls Open
- 2009 Copa Sotogrande
- 2010 Dutch National Championship

== Professional wins (2) ==
=== LET Access Series (2) ===
- 2011 Trophée Preven's, Azores Ladies Open

== Team appearances ==
Amateur

- European Girls' Team Championship (representing Netherlands): 2007
- European Ladies' Team Championship (representing Netherlands): 2008, 2009, 2010
- Espirito Santo Trophy (representing Netherlands): 2008, 2010
- Vagliano Trophy (representing the Continent of Europe): 2009 (winners)

Professional

- European Ladies Golf Cup (representing Netherlands): 2008
