= Billie-Jo Smith =

English golfer

Personal information
- Nationality: England
- Born: 1999 (age 26–27) Mansfield, England

Career
- Sport: Golf
- College: University of Derby
- Turned professional: 2022
- Current tour: Ladies European Tour (joined 2022)
- Former tour: LET Access Series
- Professional wins: 1

Achievements and awards
- LET Access Series Players Player of the Year: 2024

Billie-Jo Smith (born 1999) is an English professional golfer and Ladies European Tour player. She was LET Access Series Players Player of the Year in 2024.

== Early life and amateur career ==
Smith was born and raised in Mansfield, in Nottinghamshire, and was introduced to golf by her grandparents when she was four. She didn't follow the usual collegiate pathway and instead was educated at Tournament Golf College (TGC) before earning a master's degree at the University of Derby, where she is also pursuing a PhD.

In 2021, Smith was runner-up at the Welsh Women's Open Stroke Play Championship, behind Lottie Woad.

== Professional career ==
Smith turned professional in 2022 and joined the Ladies European Tour (LET) after earning status at Q-School. Her best finish in her rookie season was a tie for 27th at the Jabra Ladies Open in France.

She sat out most of the 2023 season due to injury, and on her return won a Rose Ladies Series event in early 2024.

In 2024, she joined the LET Access Series where she finished third in the Order of Merit behind Kajsa Arwefjäll and Helen Briem, to graduate to the LET.

Smith lost the final three events of the season in three consecutive playoffs. She was voted the inaugural Players Player of the Year.

== Professional wins (1) ==
=== Other wins (1) ===
- 2024 Rose Ladies Series – Formby Ladies

== Playoff record ==
LET Access Series playoff record (0–3)

No.	Year	Tournament	Opponent(s)	Result
1	2024	Hauts de France – Pas de Calais Golf Open	(Switzerland) Anaïs Maggetti (Australia) Kelsey Bennett	Bennett won with birdie on first extra hole
2	2024	Lavaux Ladies Open	(England) Mimi Rhodes	Lost to birdie on third extra hole
3	2024	Calatayud Ladies Open	(England) Ellie Gower	Lost to birdie on first extra hole
