= Pegov =

Pegov (Russian: Пегов) is a Russian masculine surname originating from the old Russian word pega, meaning a spot, a birthmark; its feminine counterpart is Pegova. It may refer to the following notable people:

- Nikolai Pegov (1905–1991), Soviet official and diplomat
- Nina Pegova (born 1994), Russian golfer
- Pavel Pegov (born 1956), Russian speed skater
- Semen Pegov (born 1985), Russian journalist
