= Anne-Charlotte Mora =

French professional golfer

Personal information
- Nationality: France
- Born: 20 April 1997 (age 29) Orléans, France
- Height: 5 ft 2 in (157 cm)

Career
- Sport: Golf
- College: Texas State University
- Turned professional: 2020
- Current tour: LET (joined 2020)
- Professional wins: 2

Number of wins by tour
- Ladies European Tour: 1
- Other: 1

Achievements and awards
- Sun Belt Conference Player of the Year: 2019

Anne-Charlotte Mora (born 20 April 1997) is a French professional golfer and Ladies European Tour player. She won the 2022 Åland 100 Ladies Open.

== Amateur career ==
Mora started playing gold at a young age, and early on dreamed about playing professional golf. She comes from a golf family, her mother manages a golf course and her father is a PGA teaching professional and her coach. Mora was born in Orleans and grew up playing golf at nearby Marcilly. She now plays at Golf de l'Ile d'Or near Nantes, the course managed by her parents.

At the 2015 French International Lady Juniors Amateur Championship, Mora won the stroke play portion with rounds of 70 and 72.

Mora played college golf at Texas State University 2015–2019, where she was named Sun Belt Conference Player of the Year in 2019.

== Professional career ==
Mora turned professional in 2020 and joined the Ladies European Tour. She played in eight events her rookie season, with a best finish of 15th at the Lacoste Ladies Open de France.

In 2021, she recorded two top-10 finishes, at the Investec South African Women's Open and the VP Bank Swiss Ladies Open.

In 2022, Mora claimed her maiden Ladies European Tour victory in dramatic style, producing a strong finish to win the Åland 100 Ladies Open by one stroke, sealing her win with a birdie putt from 10 feet on the 18th hole to edge out Lisa Pettersson.

Her best finish in 2023 was a tie for 3rd, recorded both at the VP Bank Swiss Ladies Open and the Ladies Finnish Open.

Mora won the team event at the 2024 Aramco Team Series – Riyadh alongside Chiara Tamburlini and Mimi Rhodes by a record 10 strokes.

In 2025, she finished top-10 at the Women's Irish Open and won the Women's Irish Challenge.

== Amateur wins ==
- 2018 Grand Prix de Saint-Nom-la-Bretèche
- 2019 UTRGV Invitational

== Professional wins (2) ==
=== Ladies European Tour wins (1) ===
No.	Date	Tournament	Winning score	To par	Margin of victory	Runner-up
1	3 Sep 2022	Åland 100 Ladies Open	70-70-68=208	−8	1 stroke	(Sweden) Lisa Pettersson

=== LET Access Series wins (1) ===
No.	Date	Tournament	Winning score	To par	Margin of victory	Runner-up
1	29 Aug 2025	Women's Irish Challenge	67-70-69=206	−10	4 strokes	(Germany) Verena Gimmy
