= Danish Ladies Open =

Tournament information
- Location: Farsø, Denmark
- Established: 1988
- Par: 72
- Tours: Ladies European Tour; LET Access Series; Swedish Golf Tour
- Format: Stroke play
- Prize fund: £90,000 (LET) €50,000 (LETAS)

Current champion
- (Sweden) Moa Svedenskiöld

Location map
- Location in the Denmark#Location in the Europe HimmerLand (Europe)

The Danish Ladies Open is a women's professional golf tournament and the national open golf championship of Denmark. It was part of the Ladies European Tour between 1988 and 1997.

The tournament has also featured on the Swedish Golf Tour, and it became an LET Access Series event in 2020.

At only 18, Florence Descampe became the LET's youngest winner at the time when she won the inaugural event in 1988.

It was succeeded on the LET schedule in 2005 by the Danish Ladies Masters.

== Winners ==
Year	Tour(s)	Venue	Winner	Score	Margin of victory	Runner(s)-up	Purse (£)	Ref
CSK Steel Women's Open
2026	LETAS	HimmerLand	(Sweden) Moa Svedenskiöld	221 (+5)	Playoff	(Republic of Ireland) Beth Coulter (Germany) Lena Geier (a)	€50,000	
Q-Tour HimmerLand Championship
2025	LETAS	HimmerLand	(Mexico) Fernanda Lira	207 (−9)	Playoff	(Denmark) Sofie Kibsgaard Nielsen	€50,000	
Smørum Ladies Open
2024	LETAS · SGT	Smørum	(England) Gemma Clews	202 (−8)	1 stroke	(Sweden) Andrea Lignell (Sweden) Anna Magnusson	€60,000	
2023	LETAS · SGT	Smørum	(England) Gemma Clews	204 (−6)	Playoff	(Sweden) Nathalie Borg (a) (Sweden) Corinne Vidén	€60,000	
2022	LETAS · SGT	Smørum	(Denmark) Cecilie Leth-Nissen (a)	208 (−2)	4 strokes	(Denmark) Natacha Høst Husted (a) (Denmark) Amalie Leth-Nissen (a)	€50,000	
2021: No tournament
Danish Ladies Open
2020	~~LETAS · SGT~~	Hillerød	Cancelled due to the COVID-19 pandemic				€40,000	
2013–2019: No tournament
Samsø Ladies Open
2012	LETAS	Samsø	(Sweden) Antonella Cvitan	213 (−2)	Playoff	(Denmark) Nicole Broch Larsen (a)	€20,000	
2003–2011: No tournament
Nykredit Ladies Open
2002	SGT	Smørum	(Sweden) Lisa Hed	211 (−5)	Playoff	(Denmark) Lisa Holm Sørensen (a)	SEK 150,000	
1998–2001: No tournament
Ford-Stimorol Danish Open
1997	LET	Vejle	(England) Laura Davies	207 (−9)	3 strokes	(Sweden) Maria Hjorth	90,000	
1996	LET	Vejle	(Australia) Nadene Gole	207 (−9)	2 strokes	(Australia) Corinne Dibnah	80,000	
1995	LET	Vejle	(England) Caroline Hall	201 (−15)	8 strokes	(Australia) Rachel Hetherington (Australia) Anne-Marie Knight (Scotland) Gillian Stewart	60,000	
1990–1994: No tournament
Danish Ladies Open
1989	LET · SGT	Rungsted	(Spain) Tania Abitbol	285	Playoff	(France) Marie-Laure Taya	65,000	
1988	LET · SGT	Rungsted	(Belgium) Florence Descampe	285	4 strokes	(United States) Peggy Conley (England) Laura Davies (Sweden) Liselotte Neumann	60,000	

== See also ==
- National open golf championship
- Danish Ladies Masters
