= Corinne Vidén =

Swedish professional golfer

Personal information
- Full name: Corinne Louise Vidén
- Nationality: Sweden
- Born: 28 September 1997 (age 29) Mölndal, Gothenburg and Bohus County, Sweden
- Height: 173 cm (5 ft 8 in)

Career
- Sport: Golf
- College: California State University, Sacramento
- Turned professional: 2021
- Current tour: Ladies European Tour (joined 2024)
- Former tours: LET Access Series (joined 2021); Swedish Golf Tour (joined 2021)

Achievements and awards
- Big Sky Newcomer of the Year: 2018

Corinne Vidén (born 28 September 1997) is a Swedish professional golfer who plays on the Ladies European Tour.

== Early life and amateur career ==
Vidén grew up in Gothenburg and represents Delsjö Golf Club, home of the Volvo Open. She had success and won several titles on the domestic junior circuits, the Skandia Tour and the Junior Masters Invitational series, as a teenager.

Vidén played college golf at California State University, Sacramento between 2017 and 2021, and earned a bachelor's degree in nutrition and food. Playing with the Sacramento State Hornets women's golf team, she was an all-Big Sky selection each year and Big Sky Conference Newcomer of the Year in 2018. In 2019, she won the Gunrock Invitational, and having earned medalist honors in regular play, lost a playoff for the title at the 2019 Big Sky Championship to Beah Cruz.

== Professional career ==
Vidén turned professional after graduating in 2021 and joined the LET Access Series, where she lost the semi-final of the Swedish Matchplay Championship to Caroline Rominger of Switzerland.

In 2023, she lost a playoff to Gemma Clews at the Smørum Ladies Open in Denmark. She finished 11th on the LETAS rankings and as the leading home player on the Swedish Golf Tour Order of Merit.

Vidén earned status for the 2024 Ladies European Tour at Q-School where she tied for 27th, and she made the cut in her LET debut at the Magical Kenya Ladies Open.

== Amateur wins ==
- 2015 Hulta Junior Open
- 2016 Wilson Junior Open, Gothenburg Cash Tingstad Open
- 2017 Hulta Junior Open, Skandia Tour Elit #2
- 2018 Wilson Junior Open
- 2019 The Gunrock Invitational

== Playoff record ==
LET Access Series playoff record (0–1)

No.	Year	Tournament	Opponents	Result
1	2023	Smørum Ladies Open	(Sweden) Nathalie Borg (a) (England) Gemma Clews	Clews won with par on first extra hole
