= Elena Moosmann =

Swiss professional golfer (born 2002)

Personal information
- Nationality: Switzerland
- Born: 20 April 2002 (age 24) Zug, Switzerland
- Height: 167 cm (5 ft 6 in)

Career
- Sport: Golf
- Turned professional: 2023
- Current tour: Ladies European Tour (joined 2024)
- Former tour: LET Access Series (joined 2023)
- Professional wins: 2

Elena Moosmann (born 20 April 2002) is a Swiss professional golfer and Ladies European Tour player. As an amateur, she finished 3rd at the 2021 Ladies Swiss Open.

== Amateur career ==
Moosmann started playing golf at ten years old and had a successful amateur career. At age 14, she won the Swiss Junior Tour Final and became ranked in the World Amateur Golf Ranking, where she played herself into the top-100 the following year as she won five titles including the Swiss Ladies Amateur. She tied for 4th at the 2018 Summer Youth Olympics in the Mixed team event paired with Nicola Gerhardsen.

In 2019, Moosmann lost a playoff at the European Nations Cup - Copa Sotogrande and won her first professional title, the VP Bank Ladies Open, an LET Access Series event in Switzerland with a mixed stroke play and match play format. In 2021, she finished 3rd at the VP Bank Swiss Ladies Open, a Ladies European Tour event, only 2 strokes behind winner Atthaya Thitikul. The same year she was runner-up at the Swiss Golf Open Championship behind Chiara Tamburlini, and at the Austrian Ladies Amateur, before winning the French Ladies Amateur.

Moosmann was member of the Swiss National Team and appeared in three European Girls' Team Championships and three European Ladies' Team Championships. She also represented Switzerland in three World Junior Girls Championships and two World Amateur Team Championships, in 2018 at Carton House Golf Club in Ireland, and in 2022 at Le Golf National in France.

== Professional career ==
Moosmann turned professional in 2023 and joined the LET Access Series, where she won the Santander Golf Tour Zaragoza to finish 2nd in the Order of Merit and graduate to the Ladies European Tour for 2024. In her rookie season, she recorded multiple top-10 finishes, including a solo 5th at the Aramco Team Series - Korea.

== Amateur wins ==
- 2016 Swiss Junior Tour Final
- 2017 Ticino Championship, Basel Championship, Swiss National Match Play Championship, Swiss International Ladies Championship, Suisse Centrale Championship
- 2018 Ticino Championship, Leman Championship, Omnium Swiss National Strokeplay
- 2020 Swiss National Juniors
- 2021 French International Ladies Amateur Championship

== Professional wins (2) ==
=== LET Access Series (2) ===
No.	Date	Tournament	Winning score	To par	Margin of victory	Runner-up
1	5 May 2019	VP Bank Ladies Open (as an amateur)	1-up			(England) Hayley Davis
2	28 Oct 2023	Santander Golf Tour Zaragoza	67-70-70=207	−9	2 strokes	(England) Hannah Screen

LET Access Series playoff record (0–1)

No.	Year	Tournament	Opponents	Result
1	2022	Calatayud Ladies Open	(Denmark) Sofie Kibsgaard Nielsen (New Zealand) Momoka Kobori (England) Amy Taylor	Taylor won with birdie on first extra hole

== Team appearances ==
Amateur

- Patsy Hankins Trophy (representing Europe): 2018
- Summer Youth Olympics Mixed team event (representing Switzerland): 2018
- World Junior Girls Championship (representing Switzerland): 2017, 2018, 2019
- European Girls' Team Championship (representing Switzerland): 2017, 2019, 2020
- European Ladies' Team Championship (representing Switzerland): 2018, 2021, 2022
- Espirito Santo Trophy (representing Switzerland): 2018, 2022
- Spirit International Amateur (representing Switzerland): 2019
