= Lombardia Ladies Open =

Golf tournament in Italy

Tournament information
- Location: Luvinate, Italy
- Established: 2023
- Course: Golf Club Varese
- Par: 72
- Tour: LET Access Series
- Format: Stroke play
- Prize fund: €50,000
- Month played: October
- Final year: 2023

Final champion
- (Denmark) Sofie Kibsgaard Nielsen

Location map
- Location in Italy Location in Lombardy

The Lombardia Ladies Open was a golf tournament on the LET Access Series played in Luvinate, Italy. It was played for the first and only time in 2023.

The tournament was hosted at Golf Club Varese, which had previously hosted the 1958 Italian Open and more recently Challenge Provincia di Varese on the Challenge Tour. It served as a substitute for the Ladies Italian Open, which was not played that year as Rome hosted the 2023 Ryder Cup, and was the only international women's golf competition in Italy that season.

Denmark's Sofie Kibsgaard Nielsen won by four strokes and captured her third title of the season at the event, to secure the LETAS Order of Merit title and promotion to the Ladies European Tour.

== Winners ==
Year	Winner	Score	Margin of victory	Runners-up
2023	(Denmark) Sofie Kibsgaard Nielsen	−8 (66-73-69=208)	4 strokes	(Norway) Dorthea Forbrigd (Spain) María Herráez Gálvez

== See also ==
- Ladies Italian Open
