= Timrå Ladies Open =

Swedish golf tournament

Tournament information
- Location: Timrå, Sweden
- Established: 1993
- Course: Timrå Golf Club
- Tour: Swedish Golf Tour
- Format: 54-hole stroke play
- Final year: 1999

Tournament record score
- Aggregate: 216 Eva-Lotta Strömlid
- To par: E as above

Final champion
- (Sweden) Eva-Lotta Strömlid

Location map
- Location in Europe

The Timrå Ladies Open was a women's professional golf tournament on the Swedish Golf Tour, played between 1997 and 1999 in Timrå near Sundsvall, Sweden. It succeeded the Härjedalen Ladies Open held in Funäsdalen on the same latitude (62.5° N), played in 1993 and 1994.

Timrå Ladies Open was introduced in 1997 as the season's only new tournament, in addition to the launch of the Telia Ladies Finale and the one-off Volvo Anläggningsmaskiner Open.

All three editions were designated as Swedish International tournaments.

== Winners ==
Year	Winner	Score	Margin of victory	Runner(s)-up	Prize fund (SEK)	Venue	Ref
Timrå Ladies Open
1999	(Sweden) Eva-Lotta Strömlid	216 (E)	1 stroke	(Sweden) Karolina Andersson	100,000	Timrå	
1998	(Sweden) Sara Jelander	225 (+9)	2 strokes	(Sweden) Maria Bodén (a) (Sweden) Rebecka Heinmert (a) (Sweden) Sofia Johansson (a)	150,000	Timrå	
1997	(Sweden) Malin Tveit	227 (+11)	3 strokes	(Sweden) Maria Bodén (a)	150,000	Timrå	
1995–96: No tournament
Härjedalen Ladies Open
1994	(Sweden) Åsa Gottmo	217 (+1)	1 stroke	(Sweden) Maria Hjorth (a)	100,000	Funäsdalsfjällen	
1993	(Sweden) Carin Hjalmarsson	217 (+1)	1 stroke	(Sweden) Anna Berg (a)	100,000	Funäsdalsfjällen	

== See also ==
- Norrporten Ladies Open
