= Santander Golf Tour Zaragoza =

Tournament information
- Location: Zaragoza, Spain
- Established: 2010
- Course: Real Club de Golf La Peñaza
- Par: 72
- Tour(s): Santander Golf Tour; LET Access Series
- Format: Stroke play
- Prize fund: €40,000 (LETAS)
- Month played: October

Current champion
- (Switzerland) Elena Moosmann

The Santander Golf Tour Zaragoza is a women's professional golf tournament on Spain's Santander Golf Tour that has featured on the LET Access Series. It is held at Real Club de Golf La Peñaza in Zaragoza, Spain.

At the 2021 event, England's Rachael Goodall clinched her third LET Access Series title after triumphing in a seven-hole playoff against Nina Pegova of Russia.

== Winners ==
Year	Tour (Note: Several installments have been hosted under co-sanctioning agreement with the LET Access Series (LETAS))	Winner	Country	Score	Margin of victory	Runner(s)-up	Purse (€)	Ref
Santander Golf Tour Zaragoza
2023	LETAS	Elena Moosmann	Switzerland	−9 (67-70-70=207)	2 strokes	(England) Hannah Screen	40,000	
2022		Camilla Hedberg	Spain	−5 (67-72=139)	2 strokes	(Japan) Maho Hayakawa		
2021	LETAS	Rachael Goodall	England	−12 (68-68-68=204)	Playoff	(Russia) Nina Pegova	35,000	
2020: Tournament cancelled
Santander Golf Tour La Peñaza
2019		Laura Gómez Ruiz	Spain	−5 (70-69=139)	2 strokes	(Spain) Raquel Carriedo (England) Rachael Goodall	20,000	
2018		Camilla Hedberg	Spain	−7 (67-70=137)	4 strokes	(Spain) Natalia Escuriola	20,000	
2017		Patricia Sanz	Spain	−10 (68-66=134)	2 strokes	(Belgium) Manon De Roey	18,000	
Santander Golf Tour LETAS La Peñaza
2016	LETAS	Meghan MacLaren (a)	England	−3 (69-68-66=213)	2 strokes	(Austria) Sarah Schober	35,000	
2013–15: No tournament
Banesto Tour Zaragoza
2012	LETAS	Marjet van der Graaff	Netherlands	−5 (71-69-71=211)	1 stroke	(Spain) Carlota Ciganda	20,000	
2011: No tournament
2010		Carmen Alonso	Spain	−5 (68-71=139)	Playoff	(Spain) Itziar Elguezábal	20,000	
