= Allerum Open =

Coordinates: 56.119°N 12.679°E

Tournament information
- Location: Helsingborg, Sweden
- Established: 2018
- Course: Allerum Golf Club
- Par: 72
- Tours: LET Access Series; Swedish Golf Tour
- Format: Stroke play
- Prize fund: €40,000
- Month played: August

Tournament record score
- Aggregate: 202 Tonje Daffinrud
- To par: –14 as above

Current champion
- (Sweden) Sara Kjellker

Location map
- Location in Europe

The Allerum Open is a women's professional golf tournament on the Swedish Golf Tour and LET Access Series, played since 2018 at Allerum Golf Club in Helsingborg, Sweden.

== Winners ==
Year	Tours	Winner	Country	Score	Margin of victory	Runner-up	Prize fund (€)	Ref
Allerum Open
2021	LETAS · SGT	Gabrielle Macdonald	Scotland	−4 (70-70-72=212)	Playoff	(England) Lily May Humphreys	40,000	
Allerum Open presented by Ahlsell
2020	~~LETAS~~ · SGT	Sara Kjellker	Sweden	−12 (67-68-69=204)	1 stroke	(Sweden) Linda Lundqvist (Sweden) Louise Rydqvist	SEK 150,000	(Note: Removed from LETAS schedule due to COVID-19 pandemic)
Scandic PGA Championship
2019	LETAS · SGT	Tonje Daffinrud	NOR	−14 (66-70-66=202)	2 strokes	(Sweden) Johanna Gustavsson (Sweden) Maja Stark (a)	42,000	(Note: Played as part of the Swedish PGA Championship series)
Turfman Allerum Open
2018	LETAS · SGT	Rachael Goodall	England	−9 (68-72-67=207)	2 strokes	(Spain) Maria Palacios	35,000	
