= Zuel =

Zuel may refer to:

- Bernard Zuel, living person, Australian music journalist
- Doris Zeul, alter ego of superhero adversary Giganta
- Henni Zuël (b. 1990), English golfer
- Zhongnan University of Economics and Law (ZUEL), a public university in Wuhan, Hubei, China
- Zuel, a small settlement in Cortina d'Ampezzo, Italy
