= Lavaux Ladies Open =

Golf tournament

Tournament information
- Location: Lavaux, Vaud, Switzerland
- Established: 2014
- Course: Golf de Lavaux
- Par: 72
- Tour: LET Access Series
- Format: 54-hole stroke play
- Prize fund: €53,000

Tournament record score
- Aggregate: 200 Mimi Rhodes, Billie-Jo Smith
- To par: −16 as above

Current champion
- (England) Bel Wardle

The Lavaux Ladies Open is a women's professional golf tournament in the LET Access Series, held since 2018 in Lavaux, the canton of Vaud, Switzerland.

Played at Lavaux Golf Club located a few miles from Lake Geneva between Lausanne and Montreux, the tournament is set in the landscape between Lac de Bret and Mont Pèlerin (1,080 m), with a panoramic view of the Alps.

In 2020, 16-years-old Pia Babnik produced a course-record round of 63 (−9) to take a commanding five-shot lead after the second round, but the Slovenian ultimately lost in a playoff to Agathe Laisné of France, who won with a birdie on the second playoff hole.

== Winners ==
Year	Winner	Country	Score	Margin of victory	Runner(s)-up	Ref
Lavaux Ladies Open
2026	Bel Wardle	England	−13 (69-67-67=203)	1 stroke	(South Korea) Yang A-yeon	
2025	Patricie Macková	Czech Republic	−11 (67-71-67=205)	3 strokes	(Australia) Justice Bosio	
2024	Mimi Rhodes	England	−16 (68-68-64=200)	Playoff	(England) Billie-Jo Smith	
2023: No tournament
ASGI Lavaux Ladies Open
2022	Sára Kousková	Czech Republic	−12 (70-67-67=204)	4 strokes	(Germany) Helen Briem (a)	
Lavaux Ladies Open
2021	Gabrielle Macdonald	Scotland	−7 (69-71-69=209)	Playoff	(England) Gemma Clews	
2020	Agathe Laisné (a)	France	−9 (71-68-68=207)	Playoff	(Slovenia) Pia Babnik (France) Agathe Sauzon	
Lavaux Ladies Championship
2019	Maria Beautell	Spain	−6 (72-70-68=210)	1 stroke	(Finland) Sanna Nuutinen (Scotland) Rachael Taylor	
2018	Fanny Cnops	Belgium	−7 (71-66-72=209)	3 strokes	(Sweden) Therése Nerpin (France) Emie Peronnin	

(a) – denotes amateur

== See also ==
- Flumserberg Ladies Open
