= Hannah Screen =

English professional golfer (born 2000)

Personal information
- Full name: Hannah Isobel Screen
- Nationality: England
- Born: 10 January 2000 (age 26) Hemel Hempstead, England
- Height: 5 ft 8 in (1.73 m)

Career
- Sport: Golf
- College: University of Houston; University of Oklahoma
- Turned professional: 2022
- Current tour: Ladies European Tour (joined 2024)
- Former tour: LET Access Series (joined 2023)
- Professional wins: 1

Achievements and awards
- John F Kennedy Catholic School Golfer of the Year: 2015, 2016
- John F Kennedy Catholic School Sports Person of the Year: 2017

Hannah Screen (born 10 January 2000) is an English professional golfer and Ladies European Tour player.

== Early life and amateur career ==
Screen was educated at the John F Kennedy Catholic School in Hemel Hempstead, Hertfordshire, where she was named Golfer of the Year twice. She was runner-up at the 2017 Ladies' British Open Amateur Stroke Play Championship at North Berwick Golf Club, 3 strokes behind Linn Grant, and won the 2016 BMW Telegraph Junior Open Girls Championship at Quinta do Lago in Portugal ahead of Lily May Humphreys.

At the 2019 Women's Amateur Championship at Royal County Down in Newcastle, she finished as top qualifier with a score of 7-under 139 in stroke play and won 2 and 1 over Letizia Bagnoli in the first round of match play, but fell to Mimi Rhodes on the 19th hole in the next round.

Screen represented England at the 2019 European Ladies' Team Championship in Italy alongside Lianna Bailey, Annabell Fuller, Alice Hewson, Lily May Humphreys and Emily Toy, where they lost to eventual winners Sweden in the quarterfinal.

Screen attended the University of Houston from 2018 to 2019 and played with the Houston Cougars golf team before transferring ahead of the spring semester in 2020. She attended the University of Oklahoma from 2020 to 2022 and played with the Oklahoma Sooners women's golf team, where her scoring average of 71.67 was the second-best in program history and she earned honorable mention All-American honors.

== Professional career ==
Screen turned professional in 2022 and joined the 2023 LET Access Series, where she was runner-up at the Trust Golf Links Series at Ramside Hall before securing her first professional win after beating Germany's Verena Gimmy in a two-hole play-off at the Calatayud Ladies Open in Spain. She ended the season 5th in the Order of Merit to graduate to the Ladies European Tour for 2024.

Screen recorded several top-10 finishes in her rookie LET season, including at the Tipsport Czech Ladies Open, where she ultimately finished in a tie for 8th after holding a one stroke lead going into the final round. She finished 7th in the LET Rookie of the Year ranking and 58th overall.

== Amateur wins ==
- 2016 BMW Telegraph Junior Open Girls Championship
- 2022 English U-25 Championship

== Professional wins (1) ==
=== LET Access Series wins (1) ===
No.	Date	Tournament	Score	Margin of victory	Runner-up
1	20 Oct 2023	Calatayud Ladies Open	−5 (69-69-73=211)	Playoff	(Germany) Verena Gimmy

LET Access Series playoff record (1–1)

No.	Year	Tournament	Opponent	Result
1	2023	Calatayud Ladies Open	(Germany) Verena Gimmy	Won with par on second extra hole
2	2024	Rose Ladies Open	(England) Helen Briem	Lost to par on third extra hole

== Team appearances ==
Amateur

- European Girls' Team Championship (representing England): 2018
- Girls Home Internationals (representing England): 2017 (winners), 2018 (winners)
- European Ladies' Team Championship (representing England): 2019
- Women's Home Internationals (representing England): 2021 (winners)
- Women's and Men's Home Internationals (representing England): 2022 (winners)
