= 2011 LET Access Series =

The 2011 LET Access Series was a series of professional women's golf tournaments held from March through December 2011 across Europe. The LET Access Series is the second-tier women's professional golf tour in Europe and is the official developmental tour of the Ladies European Tour.

== Tournament results ==
The table below shows the 2011 schedule. The numbers in brackets after the winners' names show the number of career wins they had on the LET Access Series up to and including that event.

Dates	Tournament	Location	Prize fund (€)	Winner
16–17 Mar	Terre Blanche Ladies Open	France	25,000	(England) Henni Zuël (1)
13–15 Apr	La Nivelle Ladies Open	France	25,000	(France) Anne-Lise Caudal (1)
24–26 Aug	LETAS Ladies Open	United Kingdom	25,000	(England) Henni Zuël (2)
21–23 Sep	Dinard Ladies Open	France	30,000	(France) Julie Maisongrosse (1)
13–15 Oct	Trophée Preven's	France	25,000	(Netherlands) Marieke Nivard (1)
17–19 Nov	Murcia Ladies Open	Spain	20,000	(Spain) Carlota Ciganda (1)
2–4 Dec	Azores Ladies Open	Portugal	25,000	(Netherlands) Marieke Nivard (1)

== Order of Merit rankings ==
The top two players on the LETAS Order of Merit earned membership for the 2012 Ladies European Tour. Players finishing in positions 3–20 got to skip the first stage of the qualifying event and automatically progress to the final stage of the Lalla Aicha Tour School.

Rank	Player	Country	Events	Points	Status earned
1	Marieke Nivard	Netherlands	7	15,106	Promoted to LET
2	Henni Zuël	England	4	13,616	Promoted to LET
3	Marjet van der Graaff	Netherlands	6	12,035	
4	Julie Tvede	Denmark	6	9,645	
5	Julie Maisongrosse	France	4	8,700	
6	Joanna Klatten	France	4	7,483	
7	Camille Fallay	France	6	7,475	
8	Maria Beautell	Spain	6	7,340	
9	Anna Rossi	Italy	7	6,815	
10	Margherita Rigon	Italy	4	6,008	

== See also ==
- 2011 Ladies European Tour
- 2011 in golf
