= 2025 LET Access Series =

Professional women's golf tour

2025 LET Access Series season
- Duration: April 2025 – October 2025
- Number of official events: 19
- Most wins: (Mexico) Fernanda Lira (3)
- Order of Merit winner: (England) Gemma Clews
- Rookie of the Year: (England) Charlotte Heath
- Player's Player of the Year: (Austria) Katharina Mühlbauer

The 2025 LET Access Series was a series of professional women's golf tournaments held from April through October 2025 across Europe. The LET Access Series is the second-tier women's professional golf tour in Europe and is the official developmental tour of the Ladies European Tour.

== Changes for 2025 ==
A tournaments in England dropped out of the schedule, and was replaced with new events in Morocco, Austria and Portugal. A new event in Spain, the Islantilla Open, saw the largest purse in tour history at €100,000. Two late additions, the Women's Irish Challenge and Q-Tour HimmerLand Championship, increased the total number of tournaments to 19, four more than the previous year.

== Tournament results ==
The table below shows the 2025 schedule. The numbers in brackets after the winners' names show the number of career wins they had on the LET Access Series up to and including that event.

Dates	Tournament	Location	Prize fund (€)	Winner	WWGR points	Notes
5 Apr	Terre Blanche Ladies Open	France	42,500	(Denmark) Amalie Leth-Nissen (1)	2	
27 Apr	Madaëf Golfs Ladies Open	Morocco	50,000	(England) Thalia Martin (1)	2	
8 May	Super Bock Ladies Open	Portugal	50,000	(France) Sara Brentcheneff (a, 1)	2	
23 May	Allegria Stegersbach Ladies Open	Austria	50,000	(England) Gemma Clews (3)	2	
31 May	Santander Golf Tour Ávila	Spain	45,000	(Mexico) Alejandra Llaneza (1)	2	
8 Jun	Montauban Ladies Open	France	45,000	(Japan) Reina Fujikawa (1)	2	
15 Jun	Amundi Czech Ladies Challenge	Czech Republic	45,000	(France) Alice Kong (a, 1)	2	
28 Jun	Swedish PGA Championship	Sweden	kr 600,000	(Austria) Katharina Mühlbauer (2)	2	
4 Jul	Swedish Strokeplay Championship	Sweden	45,000	(Sweden) Andrea Lignell (1)	2	
11 Jul	Västerås Ladies Open	Sweden	45,000	(Iceland) Ragga Kristinsdóttir (1)	2	
19 Jul	Islantilla Open	Spain	100,000	(Mexico) Fernanda Lira (1)	3	
2 Aug	Q-Tour HimmerLand Championship	Denmark	50,000	(Mexico) Fernanda Lira (2)	3	
8 Aug	Ahlsell Trophy	Sweden	45,000	(Spain) Amaia Latorre (1)	2	
15 Aug	Ladies Slovak Golf Open	Slovakia	50,000	(Finland) Anna Backman (1)	3	
29 Aug	Women's Irish Challenge	Ireland	45,000	(France) Anne-Charlotte Mora (1)	3	
7 Sep	Rose Ladies Open	England	65,000	(France) Emma Falcher (1)	4	
13 Sep	Hauts de France – Pas de Calais Golf Open	France	40,000	(Mexico) Fernanda Lira (3)	2	Mixed event with the Alps Tour
19 Sep	Lavaux Ladies Open	Switzerland	45,000	(Czech Republic) Patricie Macková (1)	2	
18 Oct	Iberdrola Calatayud Ladies Open	Spain	45,000	(Sweden) Andrea Lignell (2)	2	

(a) denotes amateur

== Order of Merit rankings ==
The top 7 players on the LETAS Order of Merit earned membership of the Ladies European Tour for the 2026 season. Players finishing in positions 8–32 got to skip the first stage of the qualifying event and automatically progressed to the final stage of the Lalla Aicha Tour School.

Rank	Player	Country	Points	Status earned
1	Gemma Clews	England	2,159	Promoted to Ladies European Tour
2	Fernanda Lira	Mexico	1,887	Promoted to Ladies European Tour
3	Katharina Mühlbauer	Austria	1,787	Promoted to Ladies European Tour
4	Andrea Lignell	Sweden	1,636	Promoted to Ladies European Tour
5	Patricie Macková	Czech Republic	1,579	Promoted to Ladies European Tour
6	Charlotte Heath	England	1,499	Promoted to Ladies European Tour
7	Amalie Leth-Nissen	Denmark	1,488	Promoted to Ladies European Tour
8	Ragga Kristinsdóttir	Iceland	1,485	
9	Justice Bosio	Australia	1,359	Qualified for Ladies European Tour (Top 20 in Q School)
10	Charlotte Liautier	France	1,294	Qualified for Ladies European Tour (Top 50 in Q School)

== See also ==
- 2025 Ladies European Tour
