= MoreGolf Mastercard Open =

Coordinates: 57.092°N 12.367°E

Tournament information
- Location: Varberg, Sweden
- Established: 2020
- Course(s): Varberg Golf Club
- Par: 72
- Length: 6,126 yards
- Tour(s): Swedish Golf Tour; LET Access Series
- Format: 54-hole stroke play
- Prize fund: €40,000

Current champion
- (Sweden) Kajsa Arwefjäll

The MoreGolf Mastercard Open is a women's professional golf tournament on the Swedish Golf Tour and LET Access Series. First played in 2020, it is held at Varberg Golf Club in Varberg, Sweden.

== History ==
The inaugural tournament featured a sudden death playoff between Ingrid Lindblad and Beatrice Wallin, both amateurs on the National Team on summer break from their American colleges, where Lindblad won with an eagle on the first playoff hole.

In 2023, the tournament was reduced to 18 holes after play the first two days were abandoned due to Storm Hans and heavy rain.

In 2024, Andrea Lignell set a new course record of 64 (−8) in the first round.

== Winners ==
Year	Tour(s)	Winner	Score	Margin of victory	Runner(s)-up	Prize fund (SEK)	Ref
MoreGolf Mastercard Open
2024	SGT · LETAS	(Sweden) Kajsa Arwefjäll	−10 (70-69-67=206)	3 strokes	(Sweden) Andrea Lignell	€40,000	
Big Green Egg Swedish Open
2023	SGT · LETAS	(England) Emily Price	−5 (67) (Note: Tournament reduced to 18 holes due to adverse weather conditions.)	1 stroke	(Australia) Stephanie Bunque (a) (Finland) Karina Kukkonen	€40,000	
2021–2022: No tournament
Golfhäftet Masters
2020	SGT	(Sweden) Ingrid Lindblad (a)	−16 (70-65-65=200)	Playoff	(Sweden) Beatrice Wallin (a)	150,000	
