= Fernanda Lira =

Mexican professional golfer

Personal information
- Full name: María Fernanda Lira Solis
- Nickname: Fer
- Nationality: Mexico
- Born: 7 April 1995 (age 31) Mexico City, Mexico
- Height: 5 ft 0 in (1.52 m)

Career
- Sport: Golf
- College: University of Central Arkansas
- Turned professional: 2018
- Current tours: Ladies European Tour (joined 2024); LET Access Series (joined 2025)
- Former tour: Epson Tour (joined 2019)
- Professional wins: 6

Number of wins by tour
- Epson Tour: 1
- Other: 5

María Fernanda Lira Solis (born 7 April 1995) is a Mexican professional golfer who plays on the U.S.-based Epson Tour and Ladies European Tour.

== Amateur career ==
Born in Mexico City, Lira began playing golf at the age of 7. She competed in several American Junior Golf Association events in the U.S., where she was runner-up at the 2013 AJGA Boys & Girls Senior Championship at Las Vegas and won the Oaks Course Classic at TPC San Antonio.

Lira played college golf at the University of Central Arkansas between 2013 and 2018, where she won the 2015 UALR/ASU Women's Golf Classic.

== Professional career ==
Lira joined the Symetra Tour in 2019. She won her first title at the 2021 FireKeepers Casino Hotel Championship by 6 strokes ahead of four runners-up led by Lilia Vu, after shooting a final round 62.

In 2020 and 2021, she also played on the Women's All Pro Tour, a Symetra Tour feeder tour based in Texas, where she won two titles.

Lira earned her card for the 2024 Ladies European Tour (LET) at Q-School, after shooting an opening round of 62, the lowest round of the tournament.

Lira finished her rookie LET season 124th in the rankings and was relegated to the LET Access Series for 2025, where she recorded three victories to promptly earn promotion back to the LET.

== Professional wins (6) ==
=== Symetra Tour wins (1) ===
No.	Date	Tournament	Winning score	To par	Margin of victory	Runners-up
1	8 Aug 2021	FireKeepers Casino Hotel Championship	70-65-62=197	−19	6 strokes	(Germany) Isi Gabsa (United States) Daniela Iacobelli (United States) Sophia Schubert (United States) Lilia Vu

=== LET Access Series wins (3) ===
No.	Date	Tournament	Winning score	To par	Margin of victory	Runner-up
1	19 Jul 2025	Islantilla Open	69-70-69=208	−8	6 strokes	(England) Jessica Hall
2	2 Aug 2025	Q-Tour HimmerLand Championship	74-64-69=207	−9	Playoff	(Denmark) Sofie Kibsgaard Nielsen
3	13 Sep 2025	Hauts de France – Pas de Calais Golf Open	69-69=138^	−6	Playoff	(Iceland) Ragga Kristinsdóttir

^Reduced to 36 holes due to weather.

LET Access Series playoff record (2–0)

No.	Year	Tournament	Opponent	Result
1	2025	Q-Tour HimmerLand Championship	(Denmark) Sofie Kibsgaard Nielsen	Won with par on first extra hole
2	2025	Hauts de France – Pas de Calais Golf Open	(Iceland) Ragga Kristinsdóttir	Won with par on third extra hole

=== Women's All Pro Tour wins (2) ===
- 2020 Crown Colony Challenge
- 2021 Mountain Ranch Championship
