= Brianna Navarrosa =

American professional golfer (born 2002)

Personal information
- Nationality: United States
- Born: June 23, 2002 (age 24) San Diego, California, U.S.
- Height: 157 cm (5 ft 2 in)

Career
- Sport: Golf
- College: University of Southern California
- Turned professional: 2024
- Current tour: Ladies European Tour

Brianna Navarrosa (born June 23, 2002) is an American professional golfer and Ladies European Tour player. In 2025, she won the Aramco Korea Championship team event and was runner-up at the Dutch Ladies Open.

== Early life and amateur career ==
Navarrosa was born in San Diego and began playing golf at the age of six or seven, introduced to the game by her father. She was runner-up at the 2016 U.S. Women's Amateur Four-Ball with Angelina Kim, behind Hailee Cooper and Kaitlyn Papp.

In 2019, she won the Canadian Women's Amateur, and in a match with Mimi Rhodes holed the winning putt for the United States at the Junior Solheim Cup at Gleneagles in Scotland. She reached the 2022 U.S. Women's Amateur quarterfinals, falling on the first hole of a playoff.

Navarrosa attended University of Southern California between 2020 and 2024, and played with the USC Trojans women's golf team, reaching the 2023 NCAA Division I women's golf championship final against Wake Forest.

== Professional career ==
Navarrosa turned professional in 2024, and was runner-up at the Destination Gotland Ladies Open, two strokes behind Kajsa Arwefjäll.

In 2025, she joined the Ladies European Tour after gaining status at Q-School. In her first start, she held the lead after day one with a six-under round of 67 at the Lalla Meryem Cup in Morocco. She won the team event at the Aramco Korea Championship together with Sára Kousková, Patricia Isabel Schmidt and Lee-Anne Pace, and the following week was runner-up at the Dutch Ladies Open, two strokes behind Mimi Rhodes.

== Personal life ==
Navarrosa's parents, former tennis player Ringo Navarrosa and Anchie Alcantara, were both born in the Philippines.

== Amateur wins ==
- 2016 Junior America's Cup
- 2019 Buick Shanshan Feng AJGA Girls Invitational, Canadian Women's Amateur

== U.S. national team appearances ==
Amateur

- Junior Solheim Cup: 2019 (winners)
