= Sofie Bringner =

Swedish professional golfer (born 1997)

Personal information
- Nationality: Sweden
- Born: 14 July 1997 (age 29) Henån, Sweden

Career
- Sport: Golf
- Turned professional: 2017
- Current tour: Ladies European Tour (joined 2022)
- Former tours: LET Access Series (joined 2019); Swedish Golf Tour (joined 2017)
- Professional wins: 1

Sofie Bringner (born 14 July 1997) is a Swedish professional golfer. She won the 2021 Swedish Matchplay Championship and finished fifth in the 2021 LET Access Series rankings to secure Ladies European Tour membership for 2022.

== Career ==
Bringner grew up in Henån, Bohuslän and started competing in golf at age 12. In 2015, she had a successful season and won four junior tournaments, which helped her qualify for the Annika Invitational Europe. She graduated from Sinclairgymnasiet in Uddevalla in 2016 and switched clubs from her local Orust Golf Club to train at Hills Golf Club in Gothenburg, deciding to forego the U.S. college path.

Bringner turned professional in 2017 and in her rookie season had a best finish of runner-up behind Filippa Möörk in the Flommen Ladies Open at Flommen Golf Club on the 2017 Swedish Golf Tour.

In 2018, she was runner-up at the Swedish Matchplay Championship and the Swedish PGA Championship, losing a playoff to Isabella Ramsay.

Bringner joined the LET Access Series in 2019 where her best finish was third at the Skaftö Open on her home turf in Bohuslän, two strokes behind Esther Henseleit of Germany. She also played in the South African Women's Masters on the Sunshine Ladies Tour where she held the lead after the first round. She finished tied 6th, 4 strokes behind Leján Lewthwaite. She made two LET starts in the spring of 2019 and finished T15 at South African Women's Open and T13 at La Reserva de Sotogrande Invitational.

In August 2021, Bringner won her first professional event, the Swedish Matchplay Championship on the LET Access Series, beating Caroline Rominger of Switzerland 4&3. The following week she lost a playoff at the GolfUppsala Open, another LETAS event, to San Jose State student Kajsa Arwefjäll, after she held a one shot lead ahead of the final round. After four top-10 finishes in ten events she ended the season in 5th spot in the LET Access Series rankings, and secured a 2022 Ladies European Tour card.

In 2022, Bringner shared the lead at the Ladies Italian Open with Kim and Morgane Métraux, after shooting an LET career-low of 67 (–5) in the opening round. Two weeks later Bringner held the individual lead at the Aramco Team Series - London after shooting a first day round of 66 (–7) which included three eagles.

== Amateur wins ==
- 2013 Skandia Tour Regional #4 Göteborg
- 2014 Skandia Tour Riks #3 Göteborg
- 2015 Öijared Junior Open, Karin Koch Junior Open, Skandia Tour Riks #4 Västergötland, Wilson JMI Open
- 2016 Sotenäs Junior Open, Skandia Tour Riks #4 Östergötland

== Professional wins (1) ==
=== LET Access Series (1) ===
No.	Date	Tournament	Winning score	To par	Margin of victory	Runner-up	Ref
1	1 Aug 2021	Swedish Matchplay Championship^	4 and 3			(Switzerland) Caroline Rominger	

^Co-sanctioned with the Nordic Golf Tour

=== Nordic Golf Tour (1) ===
- 2021 Swedish Matchplay Championship^

^Co-sanctioned with the LET Access Series
