= Islantilla Open =

Golf tournament in Spain

Tournament information
- Location: Huelva, Andalusia, Spain
- Course(s): Islantilla Golf Resort
- Par: 72
- Tour(s): LET Access Series
- Format: 54-hole Stroke play
- Prize fund: €100,000
- Month played: July

Current champion
- (Mexico) Fernanda Lira

The Islantilla Open is a women's professional golf tournament on the LET Access Series, held in Huelva, Andalusia, Spain.

The DoubleTree by Hilton Islantilla Beach Golf Resort in Andalusia hosts the 54-hole stroke play tournament, which with a prize fund of €100,000 is a new record for the LET Access Series. The resort previously hosted the Turespaña Masters Open de Andalucía in 1995 on the European Tour.

== Winners ==
Year	Winner	Country	Score	Margin of victory	Runner-up	Prize fund (€)
2025	Fernanda Lira	Mexico	–8 (69-70-69=208)	6 strokes	(England) Jessica Hall	100,000
