= Montauban Ladies Open =

Tournament information
- Location: Montauban, Occitania, France
- Established: 2019
- Course: Golf de Montauban L'Estang
- Par: 72
- Tour: LET Access Series
- Format: 54-hole Stroke play
- Prize fund: €45,000
- Month played: June

Tournament record score
- Aggregate: 203 Sofie Kibsgaard Nielsen
- To par: −13 as above

Current champion
- (Netherlands) Lauren Holmey

The Montauban Ladies Open is a women's professional golf tournament played as part of the LET Access Series, held since 2019 at Golf de Montauban L'Estang in Montauban, France.

== History ==
In 2021, French amateur Marine Griffaut, a member of Texas State Bobcats women's golf team, earned her first professional win.

In 2024, amateur Helen Briem won her first of 3 consecutive LETAS titles at the event.

== Winners ==
| Year | Winner | Country | Score | Margin of victory | Runner(s)-up | Ref |
Arkea Montauban Ladies Open
| 2026 | Lauren Holmey | Netherlands | −6 (71-71-68=210) | 1 stroke | (Australia) Kristalle Blum | |
Montauban Ladies Open
| 2025 | Reina Fujikawa | Japan | −7 (70-68-71=209) | Playoff | (Denmark) Amalie Leth-Nissen | |
| 2024 | Helen Briem (a) | Germany | −7 (70-70-69=209) | 1 stroke | (Switzerland) Tiffany Arafi | |
| 2023 | Sofie Kibsgaard Nielsen | Denmark | −13 (68-67-68=203) | 3 strokes | (England) Emily Price (Slovenia) Katja Pogačar | |
| 2022 | Momoka Kobori | New Zealand | −10 (69-69-68=206) | 3 strokes | (Scotland) Hannah McCook | |
| 2021 | Marine Griffaut (a) | France | −7 (73-66-70=209) | 3 strokes | (Czech Republic) Tereza Melecka (a) | |
| 2020 | Tournament cancelled due to COVID-19 pandemic | | | | | |
| 2019 | Laura Goméz Ruiz | Spain | −7 (71-67-71=209) | 1 stroke | (Germany) Greta Isabella Voelker | |
