= Raymond Russell (golfer) =

Scottish golfer (born 1972)

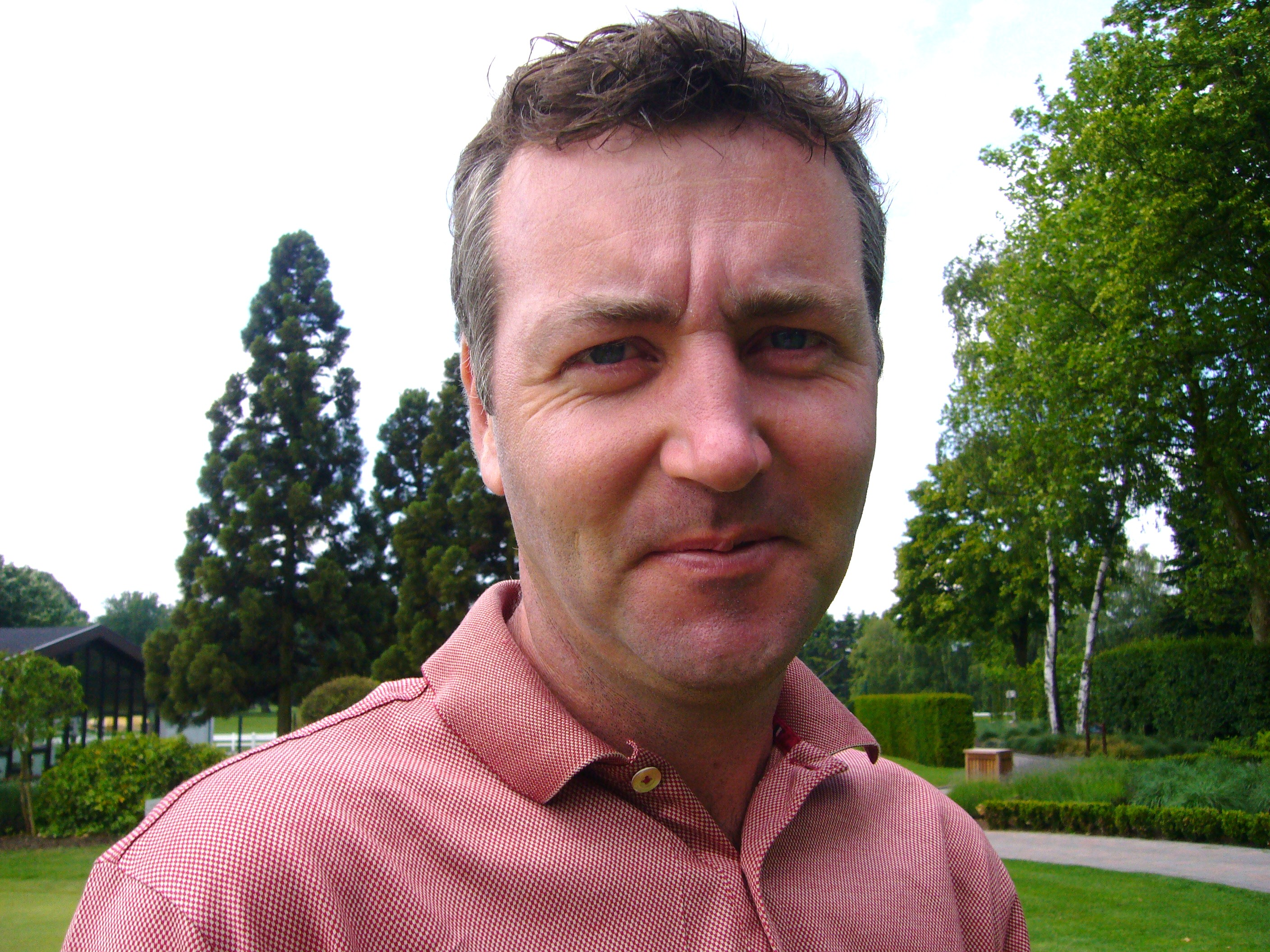
- Russell at the 2009 Telenet Trophy

Personal information
- Full name: Raymond Russell
- Nationality: Scotland
- Born: 26 July 1972 (age 54) Edinburgh, Scotland
- Height: 5 ft 11 in (1.80 m)

Career
- Sport: Golf
- Turned professional: 1993
- Current tour: Challenge Tour
- Former tour: European Tour
- Professional wins: 3
- Highest ranking: 97 (16 November 1997)

Number of wins by tour
- European Tour: 1
- Challenge Tour: 1
- Other: 1

Best results in major championships
- Masters Tournament: DNP
- PGA Championship: DNP
- U.S. Open: CUT: 1997
- The Open Championship: T4: 1998

Raymond Russell (born 26 July 1972) is a Scottish professional golfer.

== Career ==
Russell turned professional in 1993 and won a European Tour card at the 1995 qualifying school. His only European Tour win came in his 1996 rookie season at the Air France Cannes Open. 1996 and 1997 were his two best seasons, with 14th and 16th place seasons on the Order of Merit. He did not build on this early success, but stayed in the top 100 of the Order of Merit every season until 2004. In 2005 he finished 119th and lost full membership of the tour. His best finish in a major championship is tied fourth at the 1998 Open Championship at Royal Birkdale.

Russell represented Great Britain & Ireland in the 1993 Walker Cup and Scotland in the Alfred Dunhill Cup (1996 and 1997) and the 1997 World Cup.

== Amateur wins ==
- 1988 Scottish Boys Under-16 Championship
- 1992 Scottish Youths Championship

== Professional wins (3) ==
=== European Tour wins (1) ===
No.	Date	Tournament	Winning score	Margin of victory	Runner-up
1	21 Apr 1996	Air France Cannes Open	−12 (66-68-67-71=272)	2 strokes	(England) David Carter

=== Challenge Tour wins (1) ===
No.	Date	Tournament	Winning score	Margin of victory	Runner-up
1	30 Jun 2012	Challenge Provincia di Varese	−17 (63-67-66-67=263)	1 stroke	(Argentina) Daniel Vancsik

Challenge Tour playoff record (0–1)

No.	Year	Tournament	Opponent	Result
1	1994	Interlaken Open	(England) Neal Briggs	Lost to birdie on fourth extra hole

=== Alps Tour wins (1) ===
No.	Date	Tournament	Winning score	Margin of victory	Runners-up
1	17 Apr 2010	Peugeot Tour Empordà	−11 (68-64-70=202)	2 strokes	(Spain) Carlos del Moral, (Italy) Matteo Delpodio, (Spain) Xavier Guzmán

== Results in major championships ==
Tournament	1997	1998	1999	2000	2001	2002
U.S. Open	CUT					
The Open Championship	T38	T4	CUT	CUT		CUT

Note: Russell only played in the U.S. Open and The Open Championship.

Top 10
Did not play

CUT = missed the half-way cut
"T" indicates a tie for a place

== Team appearances ==
Amateur

- Jacques Léglise Trophy (representing Great Britain & Ireland): 1989 (winners)
- European Amateur Team Championship (representing Scotland): 1993
- Walker Cup (representing Great Britain & Ireland): 1993
- European Amateur Team Championship (representing Scotland): 1993

Professional

- Dunhill Cup (representing Scotland): 1996, 1997
- World Cup (representing Scotland): 1997

== See also ==
- 2010 Challenge Tour graduates
