= Calatayud Ladies Open =

Golf tournament in Spain

Tournament information
- Location: Calatayud, Province of Zaragoza, Spain
- Course: Gambito Golf Calatayud
- Par: 72
- Tour: LET Access Series
- Format: 54-hole Stroke play
- Prize fund: €50,000
- Month played: October

Tournament record score
- Aggregate: 202 Elsa Svensson (2026)
- To par: –14 as above

Current champion
- (Sweden) Elsa Svensson

The Calatayud Ladies Open is a women's professional golf tournament on the LET Access Series, held in Calatayud, Province of Zaragoza, Spain.

The LETAS tournament in Spain moved to Calatayud in 2022 after being held in Murcia in 2010 and 2011, and Costa Blanca in 2014. It draws on the legacy of a Ladies European Tour event held in Marbella in 1988.

== Winners ==
Year	Tour	Winner	Country	Score	Margin of victory	Runner(s)-up	Prize fund (€)	Ref
Iberdrola Calatayud Ladies Open
2026	LETAS	Elsa Svensson	Sweden	202 (−14)	3 strokes	(Sweden) Johanna Sjursen	50,000	
2025	LETAS	Andrea Lignell	Sweden	205 (−11)	2 strokes	(Germany) Hanna Tauber	45,000	
2024	LETAS	Ellie Gower	England	206 (−10)	Playoff	(England) Billie-Jo Smith	45,000	
Calatayud Ladies Open
2023	LETAS	Hannah Screen	England	211 (−5)	2 strokes	(Germany) Verena Gimmy	40,000	
2022	LETAS	Amy Taylor	England	207 (−9)	Playoff	(Denmark) Sofie Kibsgaard Nielsen (New Zealand) Momoka Kobori (Switzerland) Elena Moosmann (a)	40,000	
2014–2021: No tournament
Costa Blanca Ladies Open
2013	LETAS	Mireia Prat	Spain	226 (+10)	2 strokes	(England) Holly Calvert (Italy) Vittoria Valvassori	25,000	
2012: No tournament
Murcia Ladies Open
2011	LETAS	Carlota Ciganda	Spain	214 (−5)	Playoff	(Denmark) Julie Tvede	20,000	
2010	LETAS	Julie Tvede	Denmark	220 (+1)	Playoff	(Wales) Sahra Hassan	20,000	
1988–2009: No tournament
Marbella Ladies Open
1988	LET	Laurette Maritz	South Africa	283 (−3)	3 strokes	(Scotland) Dale Reid (Australia) Corinne Dibnah	£9,000	
