= Mimi Rhodes =

English professional golfer (born 2001)

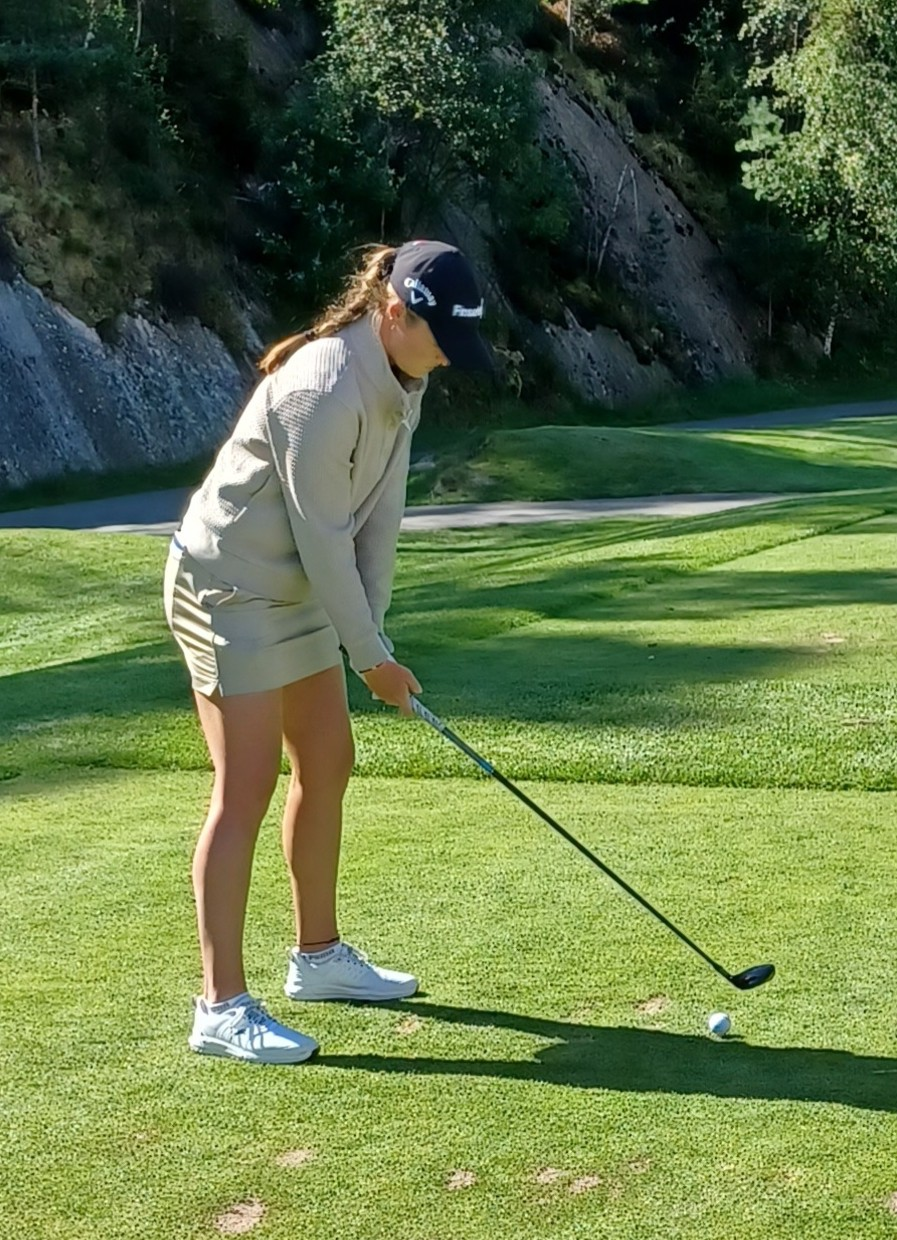
- Rhodes at the 2025 Hills Ladies Open

Personal information
- Full name: Euphemie Rhodes
- Nickname: Mimi
- Nationality: England
- Born: 17 December 2001 (age 24) Bath, Somerset, England
- Height: 5 ft 8 in (1.73 m)

Career
- Sport: Golf
- College: Wake Forest University
- Turned professional: 2024
- Current tours: LPGA Tour (joined 2026); Ladies European Tour (joined 2025)
- Former tour: LET Access Series (joined 2024)
- Professional wins: 4

Number of wins by tour
- Ladies European Tour: 3
- WPGA Tour of Australasia: 1
- Other: 1

Best results in LPGA major championships
- Chevron Championship: CUT: 2026
- Women's PGA C'ship: CUT: 2025, 2026
- U.S. Women's Open: CUT: 2026
- Women's British Open: T19: 2025
- Evian Championship: CUT: 2025, 2026

Achievements and awards
- Ladies European Tour Rookie of the Year: 2025

Euphemie "Mimi" Rhodes (born 17 December 2001) is an English professional golfer who plays on the LPGA Tour and Ladies European Tour. In 2025, she won the Ford Women's NSW Open, Joburg Ladies Open, and Dutch Ladies Open. She represented the winning European team at the 2026 Solheim Cup.

== Early life ==
Rhodes was born in Bath, Somerset, England, and raised in Sotogrande, Spain. She was introduced to golf aged eight by her grandmother, a single-figure handicap golfer. Her sister Patience is also a golfer who attends Arizona State University. They were educated at Millfield School.

== Amateur career ==
Rhodes was runner-up at the 2018 French International Ladies Amateur Championship (Trophee Cécile de Rothschild), which helped put her on the 2019 Junior Solheim Cup team.

Rhodes attended Wake Forest University from 2020 to 2024. She helped Wake Forest win the 2023 NCAA Division I women's golf championship, and tied for 10th individually in 2024 to earn NCAA All-American honors.

Alongside her sister, she won bronze at the 2024 European Ladies' Team Championship in Madrid and won the 2024 Curtis Cup at Sunningdale Golf Club.

== Professional career ==
Rhodes turned professional after the 2024 Curtis Cup and joined the LET Access Series, where she won the Lavaux Ladies Open in Switzerland after a playoff against her compatriot Billie-Jo Smith.

She received an invitation for the 2024 Aramco Team Series – Riyadh on the Ladies European Tour, where she won the team event alongside Chiara Tamburlini and Anne-Charlotte Mora. Rhodes shared medalist honors at the 2024 LGPA Q-Series Qualifying Stage in Venice, Florida.

She earned her card for the 2025 Ladies European Tour at Q-School where she tied for 19th. Rhodes won her first LET tournament at the Ford Women's NSW Open in March 2025. It was her fourth appearance in a LET event and her tournament included a course record nine-under-par 62 in the second-round. The following month, she claimed her second LET title at the Joburg Ladies Open. She secured a one-stroke victory and afterwards said "It's honestly a dream come true - and to be playing so well so early in my career, I'm lost for words." In May, Rhodes won her third consecutive tournament at the Dutch Ladies Open, securing a two-stroke triumph. In June 2025, Rhodes was given an invitation to make her major debut at the Women's PGA Championship at Fields Ranch East course in Texas.

In the 2025 Women's British Open at Royal Porthcawl Golf Club, Rhodes hit a hole-in-one at the fifth hole during her fourth round. She finished the tournament tied for 19th. After leading the 2025 Ladies European Tour Order of Merit rankings for the main part of the season, Rhodes ultimately finished second to Shannon Tan, but still won the Rookie of the Year award.

Rhodes secured her card for the 2026 LPGA Tour at Q-Series. She began 2026 with top-10 finishes in her first two events, but then struggled for form, missing the cut in seven out of eight starts. Her form improved and she received one of Anna Nordqvist's captains' picks to make her debut for Europe in the 2026 Solheim Cup at Bernardus Golf in the Nertherlands. She partnered Nastasia Nadaud in the day one fourballs, and the pair defeated Allisen Corpuz and Auston Kim 2 and 1. She reunited with Nadaud in the day two foursomes and the pair recorded a 4 and 3 victory over Kim and Andrea Lee. On day three, she lost her singles match with Nelly Korda 4 and 2. Europe reclaimed the trophy from the United States with an overall 15–13 victory.

In November, Rhodes finished in a tie for third at the Wistron Ladies Open on the Ladies European Tour. One week later, she finished runner-up to Ana Peláez at the Aramco China Championship.

== Amateur wins ==
- 2017 US Kids - European Championship, Memorial Norberto Goizueta, Campeonato del Club Costa de Azahar
- 2019 Justin Rose Telegraph Junior Golf Championship
- 2023 Campeonato Internacional Absoluto de Andalucia

== Professional wins (4) ==
=== Ladies European Tour wins (3) ===
No.	Date	Tournament	Winning score	To par	Margin of victory	Runner(s)-up	Ref
1	23 Mar 2025	Ford Women's NSW Open^{1}	68-62-68-69=267	−17	2 strokes	(Italy) Alessandra Fanali (Australia) Kirsten Rudgeley	
2	6 Apr 2025	Joburg Ladies Open^{2}	65-69-71=205	−14	1 stroke	(South Africa) Casandra Alexander	
3	18 May 2025	Dutch Ladies Open	69-69-69=207	−9	2 strokes	(United States) Brianna Navarrosa (Netherlands) Anne van Dam	

^{1}Co-sanctioned by the WPGA Tour of Australasia
^{2}Co-sanctioned by the Sunshine Ladies Tour

=== LET Access Series wins (1) ===
No.	Date	Tournament	Score	Margin of victory	Runner-up	Ref
1	20 Sep 2024	(England) Lavaux Ladies Open	−16 (68-68-64=200)	Playoff	(England) Billie-Jo Smith	

LET Access Series playoff record (1–0)

No.	Year	Tournament	Opponent(s)	Result	Ref
3	2024	Lavaux Ladies Open	(England) Billie-Jo Smith	Won with birdie on third extra hole	

== Results in LPGA majors ==
Tournament	2025	2026
Chevron Championship		CUT
U.S. Women's Open		CUT
Women's PGA Championship	CUT	CUT
The Evian Championship	CUT	CUT
Women's British Open	T19	T36

Did not play

CUT = missed the half-way cut
T = tied

== Team appearances ==
Amateur

- Junior Solheim Cup (representing Europe): 2019
- World Junior Girls Championship (representing England): 2018, 2019
- European Girls' Team Championship (representing England): 2018, 2019
- Girls Home Internationals (representing England): 2018 (winners)
- Women's Home Internationals (representing England): 2019 (winners)
- Women's and Men's Home Internationals (representing England): 2023 (winners)
- European Ladies' Team Championship (representing England): 2024
- Curtis Cup (representing the Great Britain & Ireland): 2024 (winners)

Professional

- Solheim Cup (representing Europe): 2026 (winners)
