= Women's Irish Challenge =

Professional golf tournament

Tournament information
- Location: Malahide, County Dublin, Ireland
- Established: 2025
- Course: Malahide Golf Club
- Tour: LET Access Series
- Format: 54-hole Stroke play
- Prize fund: €45,000
- Month played: July

Tournament record score
- Aggregate: 206 Anne-Charlotte Mora (2015)
- To par: −10 as above

Current champion
- (Northern Ireland) Beth Coulter

Location map
- Location in Ireland Location in County Dublin

The Women's Irish Challenge is a professional golf tournament on the LET Access Series, held in Ireland.

== History ==
The tournament became part of the LET Access Series schedule in 2025, held at Malahide Golf Club in Malahide, County Dublin. A corresponding men's event, the Irish Challenge on the Challenge Tour, has been held since 2015.

== Winners ==
| Year | Winner | Score | To Par | Margin of victory | Runner-up |
|---|---|---|---|---|---|
| 2026 | (Northern Ireland) Beth Coulter | 74-67-70=211 | −5 | Playoff | (South Korea) Yang Ayeon |
| 2025 | (France) Anne-Charlotte Mora | 67-70-69=206 | −10 | 4 strokes | (Germany) Verena Gimmy |

== See also ==
- Women's Irish Open
