= Gemma Clews =

English professional golfer

Personal information
- Nationality: England
- Born: 1 October 1994 (age 32) Manchester, England
- Height: 5 ft 4 in (1.63 m)

Career
- Sport: Golf
- Turned professional: 2017
- Current tour: LET Access Series
- Former tour: Ladies European Tour
- Professional wins: 4

Gemma Clews (born 1 October 1994) is an English professional golfer and Ladies European Tour player.

== Early life and amateur career ==
Clews was born in Manchester and started playing golf at the age of 11 at Ashton-on-Mersey School and then joined Delamere Forest Golf Club in 2010.

Clews competed on international level for England, playing in four home internationals and winning three of them. She played in the 2016 Espirito Santo Trophy in Mexico, and at the 2017 European Ladies' Team Championship where she contributed two points as England beat Italy 4.5–1.5 in the final. She also represented Great Britain & Ireland in the 2015 and 2017 Vagliano Trophy against the Continent of Europe.

In 2017, she was runner-up at the Irish Women's Amateur Open Championship and won the Welsh Women's Open Stroke Play Championship at Kirby Muxloe by five strokes.

== Professional career ==
Clews turned professional in 2017 and joined the LET Access Series in 2018, sharing her time between LETAS and the Ladies European Tour in 2019. She won her maiden professional title in the 2021 Rose Ladies Series.

Clews was runner-up at the 2021 Lavaux Ladies Open in Switzerland after losing a playoff to Gabriele Macdonald.

In 2023, she was runner-up at the Czech Ladies Challenge, before winning the Smørum Ladies Open in a playoff. She successfully defended her title at Smørum in 2024, and recorded her best LET finish of the year at the Dormy Open Helsingborg, with a tie for 17th.

In 2025, she secured her third LETAS title at the Allegria Stegersbach Ladies Open in Austria, and lost a playoff at the Czech Ladies Challenge three weeks later.

== Amateur wins ==
- 2010 Cheshire Girls Championship
- 2017 Welsh Ladies Open Stroke Play Championship

== Professional wins (4) ==
=== LET Access Series wins (3) ===
No.	Date	Tournament	Score	Margin of victory	Runners-up
1	2 Aug 2023	Smørum Ladies Open	–6 (71-67-66=204)	Playoff	(Sweden) Nathalie Borg (a) (Sweden) Corinne Vidén
2	4 Aug 2024	Smørum Ladies Open	–8 (65-68-69=202)	1 stroke	(Sweden) Andrea Lignell (Sweden) Anna Magnusson
3	23 May 2025	Allegria Stegersbach Ladies Open	–3 (71-66-70=207)	1 stroke	(Austria) Katharina Muehlbauer

LET Access Series playoff record (1–1)

No.	Year	Tournament	Opponent(s)	Result
1	2021	Lavaux Ladies Open	(Scotland) Gabriele Macdonald	Lost to par on first extra hole
2	2023	Smørum Ladies Open	(Sweden) Nathalie Borg (a) (Sweden) Corinne Vidén	Won with par on first extra hole
3	2025	Amundi Czech Ladies Challenge	(Australia) Justice Bosio (France) Alice Kong (a) (Austria) Katharina Muehlbauer	Kong won with birdie on first extra hole

=== Other wins (1) ===
- 2021 Rose Ladies Series at Hillside

== Team appearances ==
Amateur

- Women's Home Internationals: (representing England): 2014 (winners), 2015 (winners), 2016 (winners), 2017
- Vagliano Trophy: (representing Great Britain & Ireland): 2015, 2017
- Espirito Santo Trophy: (representing England): 2016
- European Ladies' Team Championship (representing England): 2017 (winners)
