= Lily May Humphreys =

English professional golfer (born 2002)

Personal information
- Nationality: England
- Born: 14 March 2002 (age 24) Chelmsford, England
- Height: 5 ft 7 in (1.70 m)

Career
- Sport: Golf
- Turned professional: 2021
- Current tour: Ladies European Tour
- Former tour: LET Access Series
- Professional wins: 2

Number of wins by tour
- Ladies European Tour: 1
- Other: 1

Best results in LPGA major championships
- Chevron Championship: DNP
- Women's PGA C'ship: DNP
- U.S. Women's Open: CUT: 2020
- Women's British Open: T60: 2024
- Evian Championship: CUT: 2023

Achievements and awards
- Nordic Golf Tour Order of Merit winner: 2021
- LET Access Series Order of Merit winner: 2021

Lily May Humphreys (born 14 March 2002) is an English professional golfer and Ladies European Tour player. She won the 2017 Girls Amateur Championship and the 2023 Joburg Ladies Open.

== Amateur career ==
Humphreys had a successful amateur career. She won the Fairhaven Trophy in 2016 and the Girls Amateur Championship, English Women's Amateur Championship, and the Junior Orange Bowl International in 2017. In 2018 she won the Helen Holm Scottish Women's Open Championship and in 2019 she won the Irish Women's Open Stroke Play Championship and the Welsh Ladies Open Stroke Play Championship back to back. The following year she was runner-up in the English Women's Amateur Championship and finished third in the English Women's Open Amateur Stroke Play Championship.

Humphreys was a member of the 2018 Great Britain and Ireland Curtis Cup Team and she represented Europe in the 2019 Junior Solheim Cup. She representing Great Britain & Ireland at the 2017 Junior Vagliano Trophy and 2019 Vagliano Trophy, and played in the 2018 Summer Youth Olympics.

She made her major debut at the 2020 U.S. Women's Open thanks to being number 17 in the Women's World Amateur Golf Ranking.

== Professional career ==
Humphreys turned professional at the start of June 2021, at 19 years old, having had to postpone it a year due to the COVID-19 pandemic as the LPGA and LET Q-schools were cancelled.

After two starts on the Ladies European Tour she sealed her maiden professional win in just her third professional start and first on the LET Access Series, securing a six-shot victory at the Golf Flanders LETAS Trophy. She continued to win the 2021 LETAS Order of Merit, securing a Ladies European Tour card for 2022.

In August 2021, Humphreys played four weeks in a row on the Nordic Golf Tour in Sweden as part of the LETAS' Nordic Swing, finishing second in the last three of the events, which earned her the 2021 season Order of Merit win.

In March 2023, Humphreys began the final day six shots behind overnight leader Moa Folke at the Joburg Ladies Open, but fired a final round of 67 (–6) to secure a two-shot victory and her maiden LET title.

== Amateur wins ==
- 2016 Fairhaven Trophy
- 2017 Girls Amateur Championship, The Comboy Leveret, Sir Henry Cooper Junior Masters, English Women's Amateur Championship, Junior Orange Bowl International, European Young Masters (individual champion)
- 2018 Helen Holm Scottish Women's Open Championship
- 2019 Annika Invitational Europe, Irish Women's Open Stroke Play Championship, Welsh Ladies Open Stroke Play Championship

== Professional wins (2) ==
=== Ladies European Tour wins (1) ===
Date	Tournament	Score	Margin of victory	Runners-up
4 Mar 2023	Joburg Ladies Open^	−12 (70-70-73-67=280)	2 strokes	(Sweden) Moa Folke (Spain) Ana Peláez

^Co-sanctioned by the Sunshine Ladies Tour

=== LET Access Series wins (1) ===
Date	Tournament	Score	Margin of victory	Runners-up	Ref
26 Jun 2021	Golf Flanders LETAS Trophy	−10 (70-67-66=203)	6 strokes	(Germany) Chiara Noja (a) (Russia) Nina Pegova	

== Team appearances ==
Amateur

- European Young Masters: (representing England): 2017
- Junior Vagliano Trophy: (representing Great Britain & Ireland): 2017
- Curtis Cup (representing Great Britain & Ireland): 2018
- Summer Youth Olympics Mixed team event (representing Great Britain): 2018
- European Girls' Team Championship (representing England): 2016, 2017
- European Ladies' Team Championship (representing England): 2018, 2019
- Vagliano Trophy: (representing Great Britain & Ireland): 2019
- Junior Solheim Cup (representing Europe): 2019
- Astor Trophy (representing Great Britain and Ireland): 2019
