= Challenge Provincia di Varese =

Golf tournament in Italy

Tournament information
- Location: Luvinate, Italy
- Established: 2012
- Course: Golf Club Varese
- Par: 70
- Length: 6,433 yards (5,882 m)
- Tour: Challenge Tour
- Format: Stroke play
- Prize fund: €165,000
- Month played: June
- Final year: 2012

Tournament record score
- Aggregate: 263 Raymond Russell (2012)
- To par: −17 as above

Final champion
- (Scotland) Raymond Russell
- Location in Italy Location in Lombardy

The Challenge Provincia di Varese was a golf tournament on the Challenge Tour that is played at the Golf Club Varese in Luvinate, Italy. It was played for the first and only time in 2012.

== Winners ==
Year	Winner	Score	To par	Margin of victory	Runner-up
2012	(Scotland) Raymond Russell	263	−17	1 stroke	(Argentina) Daniel Vancsik
