= 2024 LET Access Series =

Professional women's golf tour

2024 LET Access Series season
- Duration: April 2024 – October 2024
- Number of official events: 15
- Most wins: (Germany) Helen Briem (4)
- Order of Merit winner: (Sweden) Kajsa Arwefjäll
- Rookie of the Year: (Sweden) Kajsa Arwefjäll
- Player's Player of the Year: (England) Billie-Jo Smith

The 2024 LET Access Series was a series of professional women's golf tournaments held from March through October 2024 across Europe. The LET Access Series is the second-tier women's professional golf tour in Europe and is the official developmental tour of the Ladies European Tour.

== Tournament results ==
The table below shows the 2024 schedule. The numbers in brackets after the winners' names show the number of career wins they had on the LET Access Series up to and including that event.

Dates	Tournament	Location	Prize fund (€)	Winner	WWGR points	Notes
14 Apr	Terre Blanche Ladies Open	France	42,500	(Sweden) Anna Magnusson (1)	2	
9 Jun	Montauban Ladies Open	France	45,000	(Germany) Helen Briem (1, a)	2	
16 Jun	Amundi Czech Ladies Challenge	Czech Republic	42,500	(Germany) Helen Briem (2, a)	2	
21 Jun	Santander Golf Tour Ávila	Spain	45,000	(Germany) Helen Briem (3, a)	2	
29 Jun	MoreGolf Mastercard Open	Sweden	40,000	(Sweden) Kajsa Arwefjäll (2)	2	
6 Jul	PGA Championship Gothenburg	Sweden	40,000	(Denmark) Natacha Host Husted (1)	2	
4 Aug	Smørum Ladies Open	Denmark	60,000	(England) Gemma Clews (2)	2	
9 Aug	Ahlsell Trophy	Sweden	40,000	(Germany) Patricia Isabel Schmidt (2)	2	
16 Aug	Destination Gotland Ladies Open	Sweden	40,000	(Sweden) Kajsa Arwefjäll (3)	2	
24 Aug	Ladies Slovak Golf Open	Slovakia	45,000	(Norway) Tina Mazarino (1)	2	
1 Sep	Get Golfing Women's Golf Championship	England	80,000	(England) Megan Dennis (1)	2	
7 Sep	Rose Ladies Open	England	85,000	(Germany) Helen Briem (4)	3	
14 Sep	Hauts de France – Pas de Calais Golf Open	France	40,000	(Australia) Kelsey Bennett (1)	2	Mixed event with the Alps Tour
20 Sep	Lavaux Ladies Open	Switzerland	45,000	(England) Mimi Rhodes (1)	2	
6 Oct	Calatayud Ladies Open	Spain	45,000	(England) Ellie Gower (1)	2	

(a) denotes amateur

== Order of Merit rankings ==
The top 7 players on the LETAS Order of Merit earned membership of the Ladies European Tour for the 2025 season, in addition to Helen Briem who earned membership by winning the La Sella Open. Players finishing in positions 8–32 got to skip the first stage of the qualifying event and automatically progressed to the final stage of the Lalla Aicha Tour School.

Rank	Player	Country	Points	Status earned
1	Kajsa Arwefjäll	Sweden	2,338	Promoted to Ladies European Tour
2	Helen Briem	Germany	2,163	Promoted to Ladies European Tour due to LET win
3	Billie-Jo Smith	England	1,829	Promoted to Ladies European Tour
4	Tina Mazarino	Norway	1,702	Promoted to Ladies European Tour
5	Megan Dennis	England	1,158	Promoted to Ladies European Tour
6	Anna Magnusson	Sweden	1,120	Promoted to Ladies European Tour
7	Natacha Host Husted	Denmark	1,111	Promoted to Ladies European Tour
8	Ariane Klotz	France	1,081	Promoted to Ladies European Tour
9	Mimi Rhodes	England	989	Qualified for Ladies European Tour (Top 20 in Q School)
10	Kelsey Bennett	Australia	914	Qualified for Ladies European Tour (Top 20 in Q School)

== See also ==
- 2024 Ladies European Tour
