= John F Kennedy Catholic School =

Location
- Hollybush Lane; Hemel Hempstead, Hertfordshire, HP1 2PH; England; 51°45′34″N 0°30′01″W

Information
- Type: Academy
- Motto: Pacem in terris ("peace on Earth")
- Religious affiliation: Roman Catholic
- Established: 1967
- Local authority: Hertfordshire
- Trust: All Saints Catholic Academy Trust
- Department for Education URN: 149743 Tables
- Ofsted: Reports
- Headteacher: Paul Neves
- Gender: Coeducational
- Age: 11 to 18
- Enrolment: 1132
- Website: http://www.jfk.herts.sch.uk/

John F Kennedy Catholic School is a coeducational Roman Catholic secondary school located in Hemel Hempstead, Hertfordshire, England. It opened in 1967 and has a current student population of approximately 1,100, aged 11 to 18. The school's motto is Pacem in terris (peace on Earth).

The school is also part of a local partnership of secondary schools, offering a variety of subject choices for post-16 students, but as of 2020, this partnership is more limited.

In September 2009, the school opened a major £8.4m ($16.2m) new building project which has expanded facilities for several of the school's subject departments. The building project includes:

- A new teaching block
- 4 new tennis courts on previously unused field area
- A new sports hall in the 'spinney' (a wooded area on the school site)
- A new playground in front of the school's largest teaching block, the 'B Block'
- A new car park to help deal with local parking issues, which will take up the remainder of the current tennis court area

The school has minimised the impact on the local environment by avoiding significant loss of trees. The project also involved the planting of new trees, and using trees which are required to be cut down as wood-chip paths and for the construction of the gazebo-type structure in the so-called 'spinney'.

Previously a voluntary aided school administered by Hertfordshire County Council, in June 2023 John F Kennedy Catholic School converted to academy status. The school is now sponsored by the All Saints Catholic Academy Trust, but continues to be under the jurisdiction of the Roman Catholic Diocese of Westminster.

== Achievements and recognition ==
The school gained Technology College status in 1998, has received Ofsted inspection reports describing it as "outstanding", and appeared on Ofsted's "honours list". It has also received the following special recognitions:

- Schools Curriculum Award 2000
- Investor in People

== Alumni ==
- Luke O'Nien (b. 1994) - professional footballer, Sunderland A.F.C.
