= Flumserberg Ladies Open =

Swiss golf tournament

Tournament information
- Location: Gams, St. Gallen, Switzerland
- Established: 2014
- Course: Gams-Werdenberg Golf Club
- Par: 72
- Tour: LET Access Series
- Format: 54-hole Stroke play (except 2023)
- Prize fund: €40,000

Tournament record score
- Aggregate: 204 Elia Folch, Sanna Nuutinen, Stina Resen
- To par: –12 as above

Current champion
- (Denmark) Fie Olsen

The Flumserberg Ladies Open is a women's professional golf tournament in the LET Access Series, held since 2014 at Gams-Werdenberg Golf Club in St. Gallen, Switzerland.

Originally the tournament was named after its main sponsor, the Association Suisse des Golfeurs Indépendants (ASGI). After three seasons as the successor sponsor, VP Bank stepped up to sponsor the Ladies European Tour event VP Bank Swiss Ladies Open, and the tournament was renamed after Flumserberg, the nearby Swiss Alps resort area.

== Format ==
The tournament is played in 54-hole Stroke play format. In 2023, the tournament's 10-year anniversary, the format changed to "Mätzler Mix", with 36 hole stroke play over Friday and Saturday, followed by three rounds of 9 hole match play on Sunday. The top 48 players advanced to the first match play, where the top 24 advanced to the second round, and the top 3 played in the third round, the final. Home player Elena Moosmann was the stroke play medalist and the third participant in the final alongside Olsen and Nielsen.

== Winners ==
Year	Winner	Country	Score	Margin of victory	Runner(s)-up	Ref
Flumserberg Ladies Open
2023	Fie Olsen	Denmark	3.5 points	2 points	(Denmark) Sofie Kibsgaard Nielsen	
2022	Lauren Holmey (a)	Netherlands	−8 (68-70-70=208)	1 stroke	(Germany) Patricia Isabel Schmidt	
2021	Nina Pegova	Russia	−11 (71-69-65=205)	Playoff	(Germany) Charlotte Back (a)	
2020	Sanna Nuutinen	Finland	−12 (69-68-67=204)	Playoff	(Norway) Stina Resen	
VP Bank Ladies Open
2019	Elena Moosmann (a)	Switzerland	−6 (67-71=138)	Playoff	(Austria) Isabella Holpfer (a)	
2018	Noemí Jiménez Martín	Spain	−12 (69-69-66=204)	3 strokes	(Spain) Elia Folch (Belgium) Chloe Leurquin	
2017	Linda Henriksson	Finland	−4 (72-68-72=212)	Playoff	(Russia) Nina Pegova	
ASGI Ladies Open
2016	Carolina González García	Spain	−6 (63-71-74=208)	1 stroke	(Norway) Tonje Daffinrud (Austria) Christine Wolf	
2015	Olivia Cowan	Germany	−9 (71-67-69=207)	3 strokes	(Malaysia) Ainil Johani Bakar (England) Kym Larratt (Switzerland) Azelia Meichtry (a)	
Association Suisse de Golf Ladies Open
2014	Amy Boulden	Wales	−7 (69-69-71=209)	Playoff	(England) Kelly Tidy (Scotland) Sally Watson	

== See also ==
- Ladies Swiss Open – Switzerland's Ladies European Tour event
