= Gotland Ladies Open =

Swedish golf tournament

Coordinates: 57.283°N 18.471°E

Tournament information
- Location: Gotland, Sweden
- Established: 1997
- Course: Gumbalde Resort
- Par: 72
- Tours: Swedish Golf Tour; LET Access Series
- Format: 54-hole stroke play
- Prize fund: €40,000
- Month played: August

Tournament record score
- Aggregate: 207 Kajsa Arwefjäll
- To par: −9 as above

Current champion
- (Sweden) Kajsa Arwefjäll

Location map
- Location in Europe

The Gotland Ladies Open is a women's professional golf tournament on the Swedish Golf Tour, held on the island of Gotland. First played in 1997, it became an LET Access Series event in 2024.

== Winners ==
Year	Tour(s)	Winner	Score	Margin of victory	Runner-up	Prize fund (SEK)	Venue	Ref
Destination Gotland Ladies Open
2024	SGT · LETAS	(Sweden) Kajsa Arwefjäll	−9 (67-67-73=207)	2 strokes	(United States) Brianna Navarrosa	€40,000	Gumbalde	
2019–2023: No tournament
Slite Ladies Open
2018	SGT	(Sweden) Annelie Sjöholm	−7 (69-69-71=209)	1 stroke	(Sweden) Mimmi Bergman	100,000	Slite	
2011–2017: No tournament
PayEx Invitational
2010	SGT	(Sweden) Elin Andersson	+3 (78-68-73=219)	3 strokes	(Sweden) Sanna Johansson	200,000	Visby	
1998–2009: No tournament
Volvo Anläggningsmaskiner Ladies Open
1997	SGT	(Sweden) Tina Bergstrand	+2 (68-73-74=215)	Playoff	(Sweden) Lisa Hed	100,000	Gumbalde	
