= 2023 LET Access Series =

Professional women's golf tour

2023 LET Access Series season
- Duration: March 2023 – October 2023
- Number of official events: 19 (1 cancelled)
- Most wins: (Denmark) Sofie Kibsgaard Nielsen (3)
- Order of Merit winner: (Denmark) Sofie Kibsgaard Nielsen
- Rookie of the Year: (Denmark) Sofie Kibsgaard Nielsen

The 2023 LET Access Series is a series of professional women's golf tournaments held from March through October 2023 across Europe. The LET Access Series is the second-tier women's professional golf tour in Europe and is the official developmental tour of the Ladies European Tour.

== Tournament results ==
The table below shows the 2023 schedule. The numbers in brackets after the winners' names show the number of career wins they had on the LET Access Series up to and including that event.

Dates	Tournament	Location	Prize fund (€)	Winner	WWGR points	Notes
3 Mar	Santander Golf Tour Girona	Spain	40,000	(France) Lucie André (2)	2	
15 Apr	Terre Blanche Ladies Open	France	40,000	(France) Louise Uma Landgraf (a,1)	3	
14 May	Flumserberg Ladies Open	Switzerland	45,000	(Denmark) Fie Olsen (1)	2	
11 Jun	Montauban Ladies Open	France	45,000	(Denmark) Sofie Kibsgaard Nielsen (1)	2	
18 Jun	Amundi Czech Ladies Challenge	Czech Republic	42,500	(Spain) Marta Martín (1)	2	
1 Jul	Västerås Ladies Open	Sweden	40,000	(Denmark) Puk Lyng Thomsen (1)	2	
6 Jul	Capio Ögon Trophy	Sweden	40,000	(Denmark) Sofie Kibsgaard Nielsen (2)	2	
21 Jul	Trust Golf Links Series - Ramside Hall	England	40,000	(England) Lianna Bailey (1)	2	
26 Jul	LETAS Links Series - Ramside Hall	England	40,000	(Austria) Katharina Mühlbauer (1)	2	
2 Aug	Smørum Ladies Open	Denmark	60,000	(England) Gemma Clews (1)	2	
11 Aug	Big Green Egg Swedish Open	Sweden	40,000	(England) Emily Price (1)	–	(Note: Tournament reduced to 18 holes due to adverse weather conditions. No WWGR points awarded.)
18 Aug	PGA Championship Gothenburg	Sweden	40,000	(Switzerland) Chiara Tamburlini (1)	2	
25 Aug	Ahlsell Final	Sweden	40,000	(India) Avani Prashanth (a, 1)	2	
~~3 Sep~~	Women's English Masters	England	65,000	Cancelled (Note: The event, scheduled at Hurlston Hall Golf Club 1–3 September, was cancelled "due to unforeseen circumstances".)	–	
9 Sep	Rose Ladies Open	England	70,000	(Switzerland) Chiara Tamburlini (2)	4	
16 Sep	Hauts de France - Pas de Calais Golf Open	France	40,000	(South Africa) Leján Lewthwaite (1)	2	Mixed event with the Alps Tour
7 Oct	Lombardia Ladies Open	Italy	50,000	(Denmark) Sofie Kibsgaard Nielsen (3)	3	
20 Oct	Calatayud Ladies Open	Spain	40,000	(England) Hannah Screen (1)	2	
28 Oct	Santander Golf Tour Zaragoza	Spain	40,000	(Switzerland) Elena Moosmann (2)	3	

== Order of Merit rankings ==
The top 6 players on the LETAS Order of Merit earn membership of the Ladies European Tour for the 2024 season. Players finishing in positions 7–21 get to skip the first stage of the qualifying event and automatically progress to the final stage of the Lalla Aicha Tour School.

Top 10 players in the final LETAS Order of Merit:

Rank	Player	Country	Events	Points	Status earned
1	Sofie Kibsgaard Nielsen	Denmark	13	2,439	Promoted to Ladies European Tour
2	Elena Moosmann	Switzerland	16	1,955	Promoted to Ladies European Tour
3	Chiara Tamburlini	Switzerland	12	1,638	Promoted to Ladies European Tour
4	Emily Price	England	13	1,559	Promoted to Ladies European Tour
5	Hannah Screen	England	12	1,553	Promoted to Ladies European Tour
6	Gemma Clews	England	15	1,466	Promoted to Ladies European Tour
7	Katja Pogačar	Slovenia	15	1,230	Qualified for Ladies European Tour (Top 50 in Q School)
8	Puk Lyng Thomsen	Denmark	13	1,116	
9	Marta Martín	Spain	16	1,095	Qualified for Ladies European Tour (Top 50 in Q School)
10	Katharina Mühlbauer	Austria	16	1,027	

== See also ==
- 2023 Ladies European Tour
