= Nina Pegova =

Russian professional golfer

Personal information
- Nationality: Russia
- Born: 5 January 1994 (age 32) Chelyabinsk, Russia

Career
- Sport: Golf
- Turned professional: 2015
- Current tours: LET Access Series; Sunshine Ladies Tour
- Former tour: Ladies European Tour
- Professional wins: 3

Nina Pegova (Russian: Нина Пегова, born 5 January 1994) is a Russian professional golfer who has played on the Ladies European Tour.

== Career ==
Pegova won the Russian Open Amateur Championship three times and was runner-up in the Finnish Amateur and Hungarian Amateur Championships. She has also won the Russian Open Professional Championship.

Pegova turned professional in 2015 and joined the LET Access Series (LETAS). She lost a playoff to Linda Henriksson of Finland at the 2017 VP Bank Ladies Open in Switzerland. In 2018, she finished T7 at the Jabra Ladies Open, a dual-ranking event with the Ladies European Tour.

Pegova won her first LETAS title at the 2019 Ladies Finnish Open and finished ninth on the Order of Merit. In 2020, she played in her first LPGA Tour event, the Women's Australian Open at Royal Adelaide Golf Club, where she did not make the cut.

In 2021, Pegova was runner-up at the Czech Ladies Challenge, Golf Flanders LETAS Trophy and Santander Golf Tour Zaragoza, before winning the Flumserberg Ladies Open in Switzerland. She finished 3rd in the LETAS Order of Merit to earn Ladies European Tour membership for the 2022 season.

== Professional wins (3) ==
=== LET Access Series wins (2) ===
No.	Year	Tournament	Score	Margin of victory	Runner(s)-up	Ref
1	2019	Viaplay Ladies Finnish Open	−7 (67-72-70=209)	4 strokes	(Finland) Anna Backman (a) (Finland) Ursula Wikström	
2	2021	Flumserberg Ladies Open	−11 (71-69-65=205)	Playoff	(Germany) Charlotte Back (a)	

LET Access Series playoff record (0–1)

No.	Year	Tournament	Opponent	Result	Ref
1	2021	Santander Golf Tour Zaragoza	(England) Rachael Goodall	Lost on seventh extra hole	

=== Santander Golf Tour wins (1) ===
No.	Year	Tournament	Score	Margin of victory	Runner-up	Ref
1	2024	Santander Golf Tour Cantabria	5 & 4		(Spain) Marta Muñoz	
