= 2021 LET Access Series =

Professional women's golf tour

2021 LET Access Series season
- Duration: June 2021 – October 2021
- Number of official events: 14
- Most wins: (Scotland) Gabrielle Macdonald (2)
- Order of Merit winner: (England) Lily May Humphreys
- Rookie of the Year: (England) Lily May Humphreys

The 2021 LET Access Series was a series of professional women's golf tournaments held from June through October 2021 across Europe. The LET Access Series is the second-tier women's professional golf tour in Europe and is the official developmental tour of the Ladies European Tour.

== Tournament results ==
The table below shows the 2021 schedule. The numbers in brackets after the winners' names show the number of career wins they had on the LET Access Series up to and including that event.

Dates	Tournament	Location	Prize fund (€)	Winner	WWGR points	Notes
3–5 Jun	Amundi Czech Ladies Challenge	Czech Republic	37,500	(Czech Republic) Sára Kousková (a)	2	
11–13 Jun	Montauban Ladies Open	France	40,000	(France) Marine Griffaut (a)	2	
24–26 Jun	Golf Flanders LETAS Trophy	Belgium	40,000	(England) Lily May Humphreys (1)	2	
15–17 Jul	Roma Alps LETAS Open	Italy	45,000	(France) Xavier Poncelet (n/a) (Italy) Alessia Nobilio (a) (Note: Alessia Nobilio was the best placed LETAS player, in a tie for 3rd, and received the full WWGR points.)	2	Co-sanctioned with the Alps Tour
22–24 Jul	Santander Golf Tour Zaragoza	Spain	35,000	(England) Rachael Goodall (3)	2	
29 Jul – 1 Aug	Swedish Matchplay Championship	Sweden	40,000	(Sweden) Sofie Bringner (1)	–	Match play event
5–7 Aug	GolfUppsala Open	Sweden	40,000	(Sweden) Kajsa Arwefjäll (a)	2	
12–14 Aug	Anna Nordqvist Västerås Open	Sweden	35,000	(South Korea) Nayeon Eum (1)	2	
17–19 Aug	Allerum Open	Sweden	40,000	(Scotland) Gabrielle Macdonald (1)	2	
21–23 Aug	PGA Championship by Trelleborgs Kommun	Sweden	55,000	(Sweden) Maja Stark (1)	4	
2–4 Sep	Flumserberg Ladies Open	Switzerland	40,000	(Russia) Nina Pegova (2)	2	
15–17 Sep	Lavaux Ladies Open	Switzerland	35,000	(Scotland) Gabriele Macdonald (2)	2	
7–9 Oct	Terre Blanche Ladies Open	France	40,000	(Sweden) Linn Grant (1)	2	
20–22 Oct	Santander Golf Tour Barcelona	Spain	35,000	(France) Charlotte Liautier (a)	2	

== Order of Merit rankings ==
The top six players on the LETAS Order of Merit earn LET membership of the Ladies European Tour for the 2022 season. Players finishing in positions 7–20 get to skip the first stage of the qualifying event and automatically progress to the final stage of the Lalla Aicha Tour School.

Rank	Player	Country	Events	Points
1	Lily May Humphreys	England	11	2,032
2	Gabrielle Macdonald	Scotland	13	1,996
3	Nina Pegova	Russia	11	1,733
4	Rachael Goodall	England	13	1,375
5	Sofie Bringner	Sweden	10	1,295
6	Emilia Tukiainen	Finland	11	935
7	Charlotte Liautier	France	10	900
8	Nayeon Eum	South Korea	8	808
9	Verena Gimmy	Germany	13	765
10	Katharina Mühlbauer	Austria	11	715

Earned membership for the 2022 Ladies European Tour.

== See also ==
- 2021 Ladies European Tour
- 2021 in golf
