= Sofie Kibsgaard Nielsen =

Danish professional golfer

Personal information
- Nationality: Denmark
- Born: 5 May 1999 (age 27) Thisted, Denmark
- Height: 5 ft 7 in (170 cm)

Career
- Sport: Golf
- College: University of Oregon
- Turned professional: 2022
- Current tour: Ladies European Tour (joined 2024)
- Former tour: LET Access Series (joined 2023)
- Professional wins: 3

Achievements and awards
- LET Access Series Order of Merit winner: 2023
- LET Access Series Rookie of the Year: 2023

Sofie Kibsgaard Nielsen (born 5 May 1999) is a Danish professional golfer and Ladies European Tour. In 2023, she won three times on the LET Access Series and secured the Order of Merit title. As an amateur, she won the European Nations Cup – Copa Sotogrande and played in the final of the 2022 NCAA Championship.

== Amateur career ==
Nielsen had a successful amateur career and represented the Danish National Team in European and World Championships between 2016 and 2022. Her European Ladies' Team Championship team finished 5th, 3rd, 8th, 3rd, 5th and 5th, to cement the competitiveness and consistency of the Danish side.

Individually, Nielsen won the 2016 German Girls Open and the 2018 European Nations Cup – Copa Sotogrande, in addition to winning the Danish International Amateur Championship in 2017 and the Danish National Stroke Play Championship in 2018 and 2020.

Nielsen enrolled at the University of Oregon in 2019 and played with the Oregon Ducks women's golf team until 2022. As a freshman, she was an All-American and posted the second best scoring average in school history. As a sophomore, she was a key contributor in Oregon's first ever Pac-12 Championship win.

In her junior year, Nielsen gained national attention after she led Oregon all the way to the final of the 2022 NCAA Division I Women's Golf Championships at Grayhawk Golf Club in Scottsdale, Arizona, where she went head-to-head with Stanford Cardinal's Rose Zhang, the world number one ranked amateur in the final. The match was all tied at 2–2 and Zhang held a 2-up lead with two holes to play when suddenly the officials gave Nielsen a one-stroke penalty, claiming her push cart had touched Zhang's ball in the rough. This obscure match-play-only rule was added to the Rules of Golf in 2019, gave Nielsen a one-stroke penalty, and effectively awarded Zhang and the Cardinal the NCAA Championship victory.

== Professional career ==
Nielsen turned professional after the Espirito Santo Trophy in September 2022 instead of going back to school. She played a few events in the LET Access Series, where she was runner-up at the 2022 Calatayud Ladies Open.

In 2023, played a full LET Access Series schedule where she was runner-up at the Santander Golf Tour Girona and Flumserberg Ladies Open, before winning the Montauban Ladies Open in France and the Capio Ögon Trophy in Sweden

She earned Ladies European Tour (LET) membership for 2024 after her third win of the season at the Lombardia Ladies Open in Italy. She comfortably secured both the LETAS Order of Merit and Rookie of the Year titles.

In 2024 she tied for 8th in her first LET start, at the Magical Kenya Ladies Open. In 2025 she lost a playoff to Fernanda Lira at the Q-Tour HimmerLand Championship, the leading women's golf event in her native Denmark.

== Amateur wins ==
- 2016 German Girls Open
- 2017 Cobra-Puma Skanderborg Bilcentrum Open, Danish International Amateur Championship
- 2018 European Nations Cup – Copa Sotogrande, Danish National Stroke Play Championship
- 2019 DGU Elite Tour III
- 2020 Danish National Stroke Play Championship
- 2021 Holstebro Open Championship

== Professional wins (3) ==
=== LET Access Series (3) ===
No.	Date	Tournament	Winning score	To par	Margin of victory	Runners-up
1	11 Jun 2023	Montauban Ladies Open	68-67-68=203	−13	3 strokes	(England) Emily Price (Slovenia) Katja Pogačar
2	6 Jul 2023	Capio Ögon Trophy	73-72-70=215	−1	Playoff	(Denmark) Natacha Host Husted (a) (Scotland) Hannah McCook
2	8 Oct 2023	Lombardia Ladies Open	66-73-69=208	−8	4 strokes	(Spain) Maria Herraez Galvez (Norway) Dorthea Forbrigd

LET Access Series playoff record (0–1)

No.	Year	Tournament	Opponent	Result
1	2025	Q-Tour HimmerLand Championship	(Mexico) Fernanda Lira	Lost to par on first extra hole

== Team appearances ==
Amateur

- European Girls' Team Championship (representing Denmark): 2016
- World Junior Girls Championship (representing Denmark): 2017
- European Ladies' Team Championship (representing Denmark): 2017, 2018, 2019, 2020, 2021, 2022
- Espirito Santo Trophy (representing Denmark): 2018, 2022
