= Andrea Lignell =

Swedish professional golfer (born 2000)

Personal information
- Full name: Andrea Grimberg Lignell
- Nationality: Sweden
- Born: 28 August 2000 (age 26) Gothenburg, Sweden
- Height: 5 ft 7 in (1.70 m)

Career
- Sport: Golf
- College: University of Mississippi
- Turned professional: 2024
- Current tour: Ladies European Tour (joined 2026)
- Former tours: LET Access Series; Swedish Golf Tour
- Professional wins: 2

Andrea Grimberg Lignell (born 28 August 2000) is a Swedish professional golfer and Ladies European Tour player. As an amateur, she finished 3rd at the 2023 Augusta National Women's Amateur and was part of the Ole Miss team that won the 2021 NCAA Championship.

== Amateur career ==
Lignell grew up in Gothenburg. She plays golf left-handed and represents Hills Golf Club. She was runner-up at the 2017 Swedish Junior Strokeplay Championship and won the event back-to-back in 2020 and 2021.

Drafted to the National Team, she won bronze both at the 2018 European Girls' Team Championship and also at the 2018 Junior Golf World Cup in Japan, together with Kajsa Arwefjäll and Ingrid Lindblad. In 2021, she helped Sweden place third at the Spirit International Amateur. She was part of the silver medal team at the 2021 European Ladies' Team Championship, together with Linn Grant, Sara Kjellker, Ingrid Lindblad, Maja Stark and Beatrice Wallin, where she finished her match against Emily Toy all square as Sweden fell to England in the final.

Lignell graduated high school in 2019 and accepted an athletic scholarship to the University of Mississippi, where she played with the Ole Miss Rebels women's golf team between 2019 and 2024. As a sophomore, her team, which included players such as Chiara Tamburlini and Smilla Tarning Sønderby, won the 2021 NCAA Championship, Ole Miss' first team title in a women's sport. Lignell, who played 40 holes over the quarterfinals and semifinals, drained a five-footer on the 17th hole to clinch the win for Ole Miss over an Oklahoma State team which included her compatriot Maja Stark.

Lignell played in the Augusta National Women's Amateur twice, finishing 3rd in 2023, three strokes behind world amateur number one Rose Zhang. She was initially selected for the international side at the 2023 Arnold Palmer Cup, and reached a career-best 18th on the World Amateur Golf Ranking.

== Professional career ==
Lignell turned professional after she graduated in 2024, and her first start was at the Dormy Open Helsingborg on the Ladies European Tour. She was runner-up at the MoreGolf Mastercard Open, three strokes behind compatriot Kajsa Arwefjäll, after holding the outright lead going into the final day and setting a new course record of 64 (−8) in the first round.

She won twice on the 2025 LET Access Series to graduate to the Ladies European Tour for 2026.

== Amateur wins ==
- 2014 Skandia Tour Regional #2 Bohuslän/Dal, Skandia Cup Riksfinal F14
- 2015 Skandia Tour Riks #6 Göteborg, Lexus Junior Tour Masters
- 2016 Skandia Cup Riksfinal F16
- 2017 Partille Open, Ringenäs Junior Open, Junior Masters Invitational Final
- 2018 Stenson Sunesson Junior Challenge
- 2020 Swedish Junior Strokeplay Championship
- 2021 Swedish Junior Strokeplay Championship
- 2022 Cougar Classic, The Ally

== Professional wins (2) ==
=== LET Access Series wins (2) ===
No.	Date	Tournament	Winning score	To par	Margin of victory	Runner-up
1	4 Jul 2025	Swedish Strokeplay Championship	64-77-72=213	−6	1 stroke	(Iceland) Ragga Kristinsdóttir
2	18 Oct 2025	Iberdrola Calatayud Ladies Open	69-67-69=205	−11	2 strokes	(Germany) Hanna Tauber

== Team appearances ==
Amateur

- European Girls' Team Championship (representing Sweden): 2018
- Junior Golf World Cup (representing Sweden): 2018
- Spirit International Amateur (representing Sweden): 2021
- European Ladies' Team Championship (representing Sweden): 2021, 2022, 2023
