= Marjet van der Graaff =

Dutch professional golfer

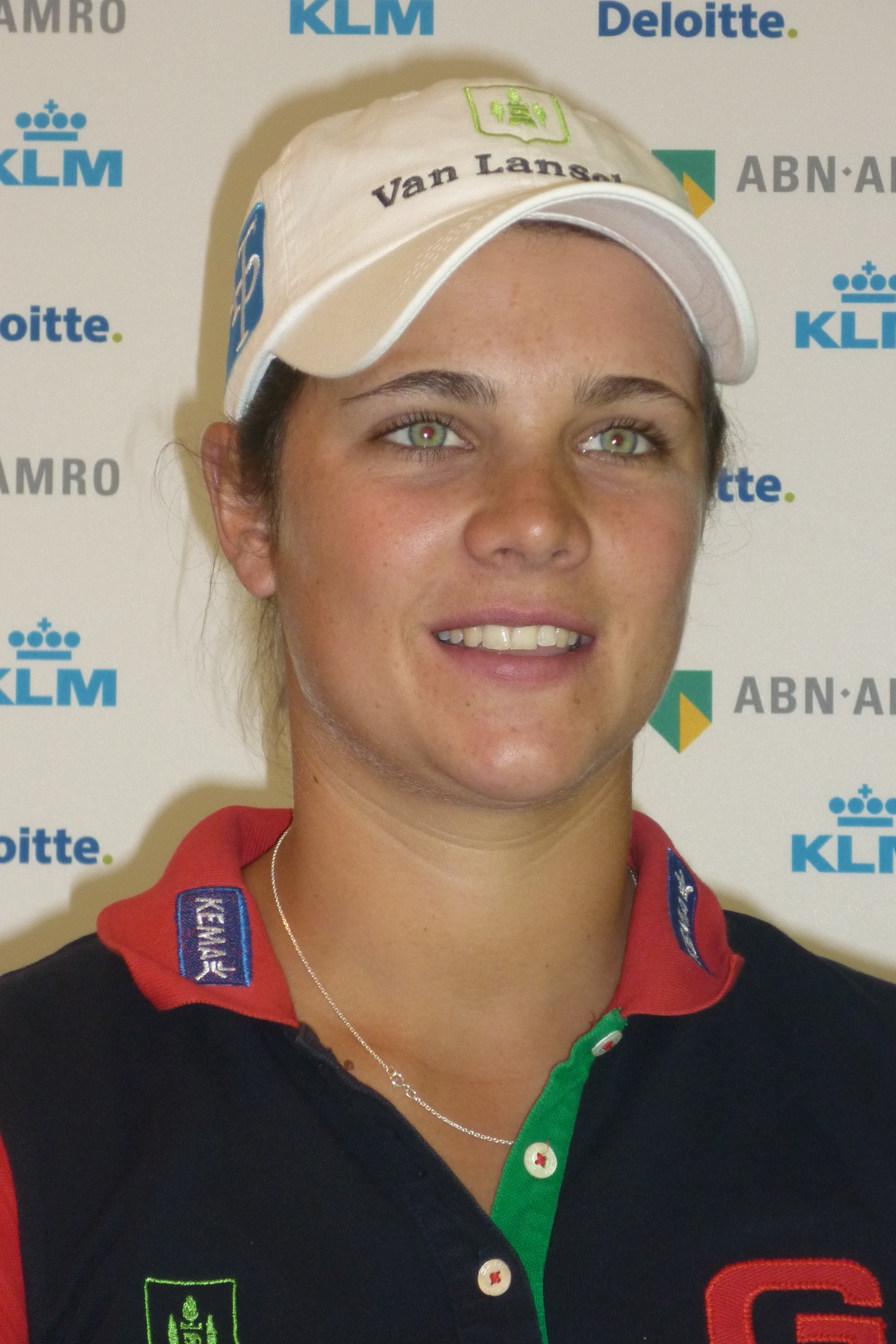

Personal information
- Nationality: Netherlands
- Born: 22 July 1982 (age 44) Roosendaal en Nispen, Rijswijk, Netherlands
- Height: 168 cm (5 ft 6 in)

Career
- Sport: Golf
- Turned professional: 2008
- Former tour: LET (2008–2013)
- Professional wins: 2

Number of wins by tour
- Ladies European Tour: 1

Best results in LPGA major championships
- Chevron Championship: DNP
- Women's PGA C'ship: DNP
- U.S. Women's Open: DNP
- Women's British Open: CUT: 2008, 2009
- Evian Championship: DNP

Marjet van der Graaff (born 22 July 1982) is a professional golfer from the Netherlands. She played on the Ladies European Tour and won the 2009 European Ladies Golf Cup.

== Career ==
Van der Graaff started to play golf at age 13 at Broekpolder Golf Club in Vlaardingen and went to college in the Netherlands. In 2006 she won the Italian Ladies Amateur Championship and the following year she was runner-up at the Finnish Ladies Amateur Championship and won the Swiss Ladies Amateur Championship. She represented the Netherlands in the 2006 Espirito Santo Trophy.

In 2008, van der Graaff joined the Ladies European Tour and finished the season ranked 83rd to keep her card. She secured her first professional victory by winning the 2009 European Ladies Golf Cup by 4 strokes together with Christel Boeljon at La Sella Golf Resort in Alicante, Spain.

In 2012 she played 14 LET events, made 8 cuts and posted 2 top-10 finishes, tied seventh at the Raiffeisenbank Prague Golf Masters and tied fourth at the Ladies Swiss Open, one stroke away from joining a three-way playoff between Carly Booth, Caroline Masson and Anja Monke. She also made three starts in the 2012 LET Access Series and won the Banesto Tour Zaragoza at La Peñaza GC in Zaragoza, Spain, one stroke ahead of Carlota Ciganda

In 2013, her final season on the LET, van der Graaff finished tied fourth at the Ladies German Open, two strokes behind Charley Hull and Carlota Ciganda.

== Amateur wins (2) ==
- 2006 Italian Ladies Amateur
- 2007 Swiss Ladies Amateur

== Professional wins (2) ==
=== Ladies European Tour (1) ===
- 2009 European Ladies Golf Cup (with Christel Boeljon)

=== LET Access Series (1) ===
No.	Date	Tournament	Winning score	To par	Margin of victory	Runner(s)-up
1	21 Apr 2012	Banesto Tour Zaragoza	71-69-71=211	–5	1 stroke	(Spain) Carlota Ciganda

== Results in LPGA majors ==
Tournament	2008	2009
ANA Inspiration		
Women's PGA Championship		
U.S. Women's Open		
Women's British Open	CUT	CUT

Did not play

CUT = missed the half-way cut

== Team appearances ==
Amateur

- European Ladies' Team Championship (representing Netherlands): 2005
- Espirito Santo Trophy (representing Netherlands): 2006

Professional

- European Ladies Golf Cup (representing Netherlands): 2009 (winner)
