= Henni Zuël =

English professional golfer (born 1990)

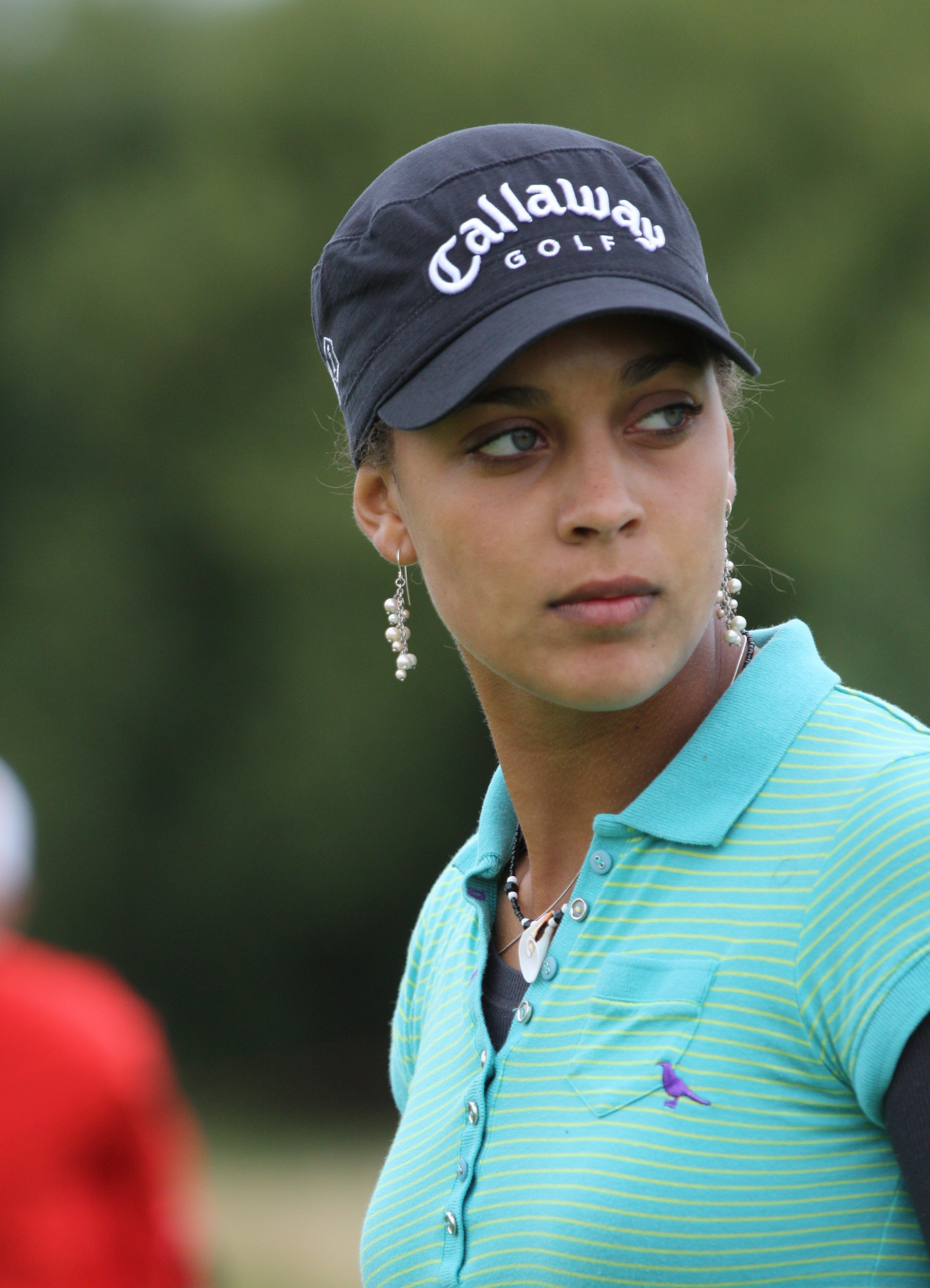
- Zuël at the 2009 Women's British Open

Personal information
- Full name: Henrietta Zuël
- Nationality: England
- Born: 6 January 1990 (age 36) Salisbury, Wiltshire, England
- Height: 5 ft 8 in (1.73 m)
- Spouses: Estanislao Goya (m. 2015; div. 2018) Ben Koyack (m. 2020; div. 2024)

Career
- Sport: Golf
- Turned professional: 2008
- Former tour: Ladies European Tour
- Professional wins: 2

Best results in LPGA major championships
- Chevron Championship: DNP
- Women's PGA C'ship: DNP
- U.S. Women's Open: DNP
- Women's British Open: T31: 2010

Henrietta "Henni" Zuël (born 6 January 1990) is an English professional golfer. She is the youngest ever player to play on the Ladies European Tour as an amateur. She was a nominee for Britain's Best Awards for Home Grown Talent and entered the professional Ladies European Tour after turning pro in 2008.

== Early life and amateur career ==
Born in Salisbury, Wiltshire, to an English father and Mauritian mother, Zuël's interest in golf first materialised at the age of nine, when she watched the Masters on television. Transfixed by the golf on display and, after watching José María Olazábal triumph, Henni stated her intention to become a golfer.

Upon receiving her first set of golf clubs, Zuël played whenever she had a spare moment. Often she practiced in her back garden, sometimes under floodlight, filming herself on camcorder to analyse and improve her game. Winning her first tournament, the T-peg junior golf competition in Dorset, confirmed that the practice was paying off.

By the time Zuël was 13, she had cut her handicap to two on the way to winning 17 Opens at Under-18 level, never finishing outside the top 10 in 50 other tournaments. Zuël was also personally selected by Nick Faldo as the youngest member of Team Faldo, which offered her the chance to play in such far flung places as the US and Asia.

In 2003, Zuël became the Yeovil Ladies club Champion and England's Under-13s champion. She also won the Dorset Ladies County Championship and played on the Ladies European Tour - the youngest player ever to do so.

In 2004, Zuël won the Central European Under-16 Championship and the English Under-15 Championship on the way to winning the Welsh Ladies Open Stroke Play Championship in 2005 at just 15 years old. Zuël also added the Welsh Ladies Golf Union Under-21 trophy to her growing list of championship wins.

The same year at the Roehampton Gold Cup, a semi professional tournament featuring a field of 30 professionals, Zuël finished as the top amateur and was 2nd overall, just one shot behind the winner, who was a competing professional on the European Tour.

Also in 2005, Zuël shot a course record 60 on the way to winning the Weston-Super-Mare Open and qualified for the Daily Telegraph Final held in Dubai.

As part of her duties for Team Faldo, Zuël won the Faldo Series East region and qualified to play in the final at the Celtic Manor Resort, the scene of Team Europe's third successive win the following year in the Ryder Cup.

In 2006, Zuël missed the cut by one shot in both the Hungarian and Tenerife Ladies Open, but did make the cut in the BMW Ladies Italian Open. All three tournaments were on the Ladies European Tour. She finished as the best amateur at the Hungarian and Italian ladies events.

At Liphook, Zuël won the Scratch Cup (an annual 36-hole event), setting a new ladies' course record of 7 under par. She took this good form to the Mauritian Open, where she finished 7th.

Zuël began 2007 in 2nd place at the St Rule Trophy held at the famous St Andrews course in Scotland and then went on to win the Girls Amateur Championship.

Later in the year, she played for Europe in the Junior Solheim Cup in Sweden, winning her singles match and the cup with 14 points to 10 and was subsequently selected for the Great Britain & Ireland squad for 2007–08. Henni was also honoured with the Daily Telegraph's Joyce Wethered Award.

== Professional career ==
In 2008, Zuël turned professional. She joined the Ladies European Tour, playing her first professional match in the Turkish Ladies Open.

Zuël remarked upon her professional goals. "I want to be European No. 1 and then world No. 1 - without a doubt. It is just more hard work to get there. More enjoyable hard work. I just love practising and love trying to improve. I spend five to eight hours practising every day and then another two hours in the gym. Tiger has changed the game technically but also in terms of fitness and flexibility. That has helped so much."

In 2008, Zuël signed to the same management that also looks after footballer David Beckham. Zuël has said she often speaks to the football star about the pressures and pitfalls of professional sport: "He is an inspiration to me – he has helped me a lot with advice and how to deal with different things. […] We speak whenever we feel the need to and the one thing he says is: 'Just keep focused.' He inspires me to work hard and go the extra mile to achieve things."

Zuël also wants to draw more females into the sport by demonstrating how women can reach the top of the game and enjoy playing the sport. "What I really want to do is make golf accessible to young girls and for them to see it more as a sport that can be played and enjoyed. I didn't really go out every weekend but it was something I enjoyed doing."

Despite having to put in countless hours of practice, Zuël still has plenty of time for other activities and believes her chosen vocation has never been in the way of her enjoying life to the full. "I don't feel like I've missed out on anything. I still go shopping with my friends and on cinema trips. For more girls to play would be absolutely amazing."

=== Broadcasting career ===
After struggling with injuries, Zuël stopped playing golf for the 2015 season, and became golf analyst for British television channel Sky Sports. In February 2019 she moved to the online broadcaster GolfTV.

== Personal life ==
In 2015, she married professional golfer Estanislao Goya. They were divorced in 2018. In 2020 she married American football player Ben Koyack. They divorced in 2024.

In January 2026, she married Fergus Nutt.

== Professional wins (2) ==
=== LET Access Series wins (2) ===
- 2011 Terre Blanche Ladies Open, LETAS Ladies Open
