= Kajsa Arwefjäll =

Swedish professional golfer (born 2000)

Personal information
- Nationality: Sweden
- Born: 20 June 2000 (age 26) Tranås, Sweden

Career
- Sport: Golf
- College: San Jose State University
- Turned professional: 2024
- Current tour: Ladies European Tour
- Former tours: LET Access Series; Swedish Golf Tour
- Professional wins: 3

Best results in LPGA major championships
- Chevron Championship: DNP
- Women's PGA C'ship: DNP
- U.S. Women's Open: DNP
- Women's British Open: T58: 2026
- Evian Championship: T41: 2026

Achievements and awards
- Mountain West Player of the Year: 2023, 2024
- Nordic Golf Tour Order of Merit winner: 2024
- LET Access Series Order of Merit winner: 2024
- LET Access Series ookie of the Year: 2024

Kajsa Arwefjäll (born 20 June 2000) is a Swedish professional golfer on the Ladies European Tour and former world champion rope skipper. She was the 2024 LET Access Series Order of Merit and Rookie of the Year winner.

== Early life and family ==
Arwefjäll was born in Tranås on 20 June 2000 and moved with her family to Höllviken in 2009, where she grew up playing at Ljunghusen Golf Club. Raised in an athletic family, her mother is an accomplished skier and her father, a former professional golfer, is her coach. Her brother, Kasper, has played ice-hockey with the Malmö Redhawks. She is a former world champion rope skipper with 21 national and international medals.

== Amateur career ==
Arwefjäll won her first international title in the 2018 Irish Girls U18 Open Stroke Play Championship at Roganstown Golf & Country Club, beating her compatriot Louise Rydqvist into second by a stroke. Drafted to the National Team, she competed at the 2018 European Girls' Team Championship and the 2018 Junior Golf World Cup in Japan, where she won a bronze medal together with Andrea Lignell and Ingrid Lindblad. In 2021, she helped Sweden place third at Spirit International Amateur.

Arwefjäll graduated from Sundsgymnasiet in 2019 and accepted an athletic scholarship to San Jose State University, where she played with the San Jose State Spartans women's golf team from 2019 to 2024. As a sophomore, she was an individual qualifier to the NCAA Championship. In her final two years she was named Mountain West Player of the Year after she finished runner-up and then won the Mountain West Championship. She played in the Augusta National Women's Amateur twice and on the winning side at the 2022 Arnold Palmer Cup.

Arwefjäll was runner-up at the 2020 Johannesberg Ladies Open and at the 2021 Swedish Junior Strokeplay Championship. With her father on the bag she won the 2021 GolfUppsala Open on the LET Access Series, where she beat Sofie Bringner on the second hole of a playoff. In 2023, she was runner-up at the Västerås Ladies Open and tied for 23rd at the Helsingborg Open, an LET event. She advanced to the quarterfinals of The Women's Amateur Championship, losing to world number one Ingrid Lindblad 4&3.

== Professional career ==
Arwefjäll turned professional after graduating in 2024, and joined the LET Access Series. She was runner-up at the Santander Golf Tour Ávila behind Helen Briem, before winning the MoreGolf Mastercard Open ahead of compatriot Andrea Lignell. Following another victory at the Destination Gotland Ladies Open, she won the Nordic Golf Tour Order of Merit.

After two victories, two runner-ups, and a total of eight top-six finishes in twelve starts, Arwefjäll secured the 2024 LET Access Series Order of Merit and Rookie of the Year titles ahead of Helen Briem, and graduated to the Ladies European Tour (LET) for 2025.

In her rookie LET season, Arwefjäll was runner-up at the 2025 Ladies Swiss Open, five strokes behind Alice Hewson.

In 2026, Arwefjäll was runner-up at the MCB Ladies Classic – Mauritius, a stroke behind Smilla Tarning Sønderby.

== Amateur wins ==
- 2016 Skandia Tour Riks #6
- 2017 Buschnell Ljunghusen Open, Skandia Tour Future #5
- 2018 Irish Girls U18 Open Stroke Play Championship, Teen Tour Future #4, Teen Tour Elite #6
- 2019 Schyberg Junior Open
- 2022 USF Intercollegiate
- 2024 Chevron Silverado Showdown, Mountain West Championship

== Professional wins (3) ==
=== LET Access Series (3) ===
No.	Date	Tournament	Winning score	To par	Margin of victory	Runner-up	Ref
1	7 Aug 2021	GolfUppsala Open^ (as an amateur)	69-72-72=213	−6	Playoff	(Sweden) Sofie Bringner	
2	29 Jun 2024	MoreGolf Mastercard Open^	70-69-67=206	−10	3 strokes	(Sweden) Andrea Lignell	
2	16 Aug 2024	Destination Gotland Ladies Open^	67-67-73=208	−3	2 strokes	(United States) Brianna Navarrosa	

^Co-sanctioned with the Swedish Golf Tour

== Results in LPGA majors ==
Tournament	2026
Chevron Championship	
U.S. Women's Open	
Women's PGA Championship	
The Evian Championship	T41
Women's British Open	T58

Did not play

CUT = missed the half-way cut
"T" = tied

== Team appearances ==
Amateur

- Junior Golf World Cup (representing Sweden): 2018
- European Girls' Team Championship (representing Sweden): 2018
- Spirit International Amateur (representing Sweden): 2021
- Arnold Palmer Cup (representing the International Team): 2022 (winners)
- European Ladies' Team Championship (representing Sweden): 2022, 2023
- Espirito Santo Trophy (representing Sweden): 2023
- Patsy Hankins Trophy (representing Europe): 2023
