= Chiara Tamburlini =

Swiss professional golfer

Personal information
- Nationality: Switzerland
- Born: 2 December 1999 (age 26) St. Gallen, Switzerland
- Height: 5 ft 2 in (157 cm)

Career
- Sport: Golf
- College: University of Mississippi
- Turned professional: 2023
- Current tours: LPGA Tour (joined 2026); Ladies European Tour (joined 2024)
- Former tour: LET Access Series (joined 2023)
- Professional wins: 5

Number of wins by tour
- Ladies European Tour: 3
- Other: 2

Best results in LPGA major championships
- Chevron Championship: T27: 2026
- Women's PGA C'ship: CUT: 2025, 2026
- U.S. Women's Open: T14: 2025
- Women's British Open: T13: 2025
- Evian Championship: T55: 2024

Achievements and awards
- Edith Cummings Munson Golf Award: 2022
- SEC Scholar Athlete of the Year: 2023
- Ladies European Tour Rookie of the Year: 2024
- Ladies European Tour Order of Merit winner: 2024
- Ladies European Tour Player of the Year: 2024

Chiara Tamburlini (born 2 December 1999) is a Swiss professional golfer who plays on the LPGA Tour and Ladies European Tour (LET). In 2024, she won the Joburg Ladies Open, Lacoste Ladies Open de France and Wistron Ladies Open. As an amateur, she won the 2021 NCAA Championship with Ole Miss.

== Amateur career ==
Tamburlini had success as an amateur and won the 2015 Swiss National Junior Championship, the 2017 Austrian International Amateur, and the 2021 Swiss Golf Open Championship. In 2016, she was runner-up at the Omnium Swiss National Strokeplay, Swiss International Ladies Championship and the Sir Henry Cooper Junior Masters in England. In 2020, she was runner-up at the Memorial Olivier Barras.

She was member of the Swiss National Team and appeared in three European Girls' Team Championships and four European Ladies' Team Championships. She has also represented Switzerland in the World Amateur Team Championships, the 2022 Espirito Santo Trophy at Le Golf National in France.

Tamburlini enrolled at University of Mississippi where she majored in finance with a minor in mathematics and played with the Ole Miss Rebels women's golf team between 2019 and 2023. In her sophomore year, she won the NCAA Championship with the team, and finished 8th individually. She was named First-Team All-American and was awarded the 2022 Edith Cummings Munson Golf Award as a junior, and named SEC Scholar Athlete of the Year in her senior year. She played for the international team in the Arnold Palmer Cup in 2022 and 2023.

== Professional career ==
Tamburlini turned professional in August 2023 and joined the LET Access Series. She made her professional debut at the PGA Championship Gothenburg at Kungsbacka Golf Club in Sweden. After a 2-under-par 70 in the first round, she scored a 30 on the first nine in the second round, considered the more difficult half of the course. She won the 54-hole tournament by five strokes.

Three weeks later, she won the Rose Ladies Open in England ahead of her compatriot Elena Moosmann in her third start. She finished third in the season rankings to graduate to the Ladies European Tour for 2024.

In her LET rookie season, she won three tournaments and captured the Rookie of the Year award as well as the Order of Merit. In 2025, she was runner-up at the Aramco Korea Championship, VP Bank Swiss Ladies Open and Aramco China Championship, and finished 5th in the Order of Merit.

She secured her card for the 2026 LPGA Tour at Q-Series.

== Amateur wins ==
- 2015 Suisse Orientale Championship, Swiss Junior Tour Event Crans, Swiss National Junior Championship
- 2016 Ticino Championship
- 2017 Austrian International Amateur
- 2019 Ticino Championship
- 2021 Swiss Golf Open Championship

== Professional wins (5) ==
=== Ladies European Tour (3) ===
No.	Date	Tournament	Winning score	To par	Margin of victory	Runner-up
1	21 Apr 2024	Joburg Ladies Open^	70-68-67-70=275	−17	7 strokes	(Thailand) Aunchisa Utama
2	28 Sep 2024	Lacoste Ladies Open de France	68-67-71=206	−7	Playoff	(Australia) Kirsten Rudgeley
3	13 Oct 2024	Wistron Ladies Open	66-73-68-69=276	−12	4 strokes	(Taiwan) Hou Yu-sang

^Co-sanctioned by the Sunshine Ladies Tour

Ladies European Tour playoff record (1–0)

No.	Year	Tournament	Opponent	Result
1	2024	Lacoste Ladies Open de France	(Australia) Kirsten Rudgeley	Won with birdie on first extra hole

=== LET Access Series (2) ===
No.	Date	Tournament	Winning score	To par	Margin of victory	Runner-up
1	17 Aug 2023	PGA Championship Gothenburg	70-66-68=204	−12	5 strokes	(England) Emily Price
2	9 Sep 2023	Rose Ladies Open	71-68-65=204	−12	2 strokes	(Switzerland) Elena Moosmann

== Results in LPGA majors ==
Tournament	2024	2025	2026
Chevron Championship		CUT	T27
U.S. Women's Open		T14	CUT
Women's PGA Championship		CUT	CUT
The Evian Championship	T55	CUT	T61
Women's British Open	CUT	T13	CUT

Did not play

CUT = missed the half-way cut
T = tied

== Team appearances ==
Amateur

- Duke of York Young Champions Trophy (representing Switzerland): 2015, 2016
- European Girls' Team Championship (representing Switzerland): 2015, 2016, 2017
- World Junior Girls Championship (representing Switzerland): 2017
- European Ladies' Team Championship (representing Switzerland): 2019, 2021, 2022, 2023
- The Spirit International Amateur Golf Championship (representing Switzerland): 2021
- Espirito Santo Trophy (representing Switzerland): 2022
- Arnold Palmer Cup (representing International team): 2022 (winners), 2023
