= Marion Ricordeau =

French professional golfer

Personal information
- Nationality: France
- Born: 21 August 1986 (age 40) Laon, Aisne, France
- Height: 5 ft 7 in (170 cm)
- Life partner: Iñigo Ceballos

Career
- Sport: Golf
- Turned professional: 2011
- Former tours: LPGA Tour; Ladies European Tour; Symetra Tour; LET Access Series
- Professional wins: 6

Best results in LPGA major championships
- Chevron Championship: DNP
- Women's PGA C'ship: CUT: 2016
- U.S. Women's Open: DNP
- Women's British Open: CUT: 2014, 2015
- Evian Championship: CUT: 2017

Marion Ricordeau (born 21 August 1986) is a former French professional golfer who played on the Ladies European Tour and LPGA Tour. She was runner-up at the 2014 Xiamen Open International.

== Early life and amateur career ==
Originally from Laon in Picardy, Ricordeau discovered golf at the age of 12 on the Ailette course in Cerny-en-Laonnois and started playing seriously from the age of 17.

In June 2008, while studying in Toulouse, she became French university champion. Three months later, she was crowned world university champion at the World University Golf Championship in Sun City, South Africa, beating American Katie Tewell and Swiss Caroline Rominger. She was runner-up at the 2009 Copa Sotogrande two strokes behind Marieke Nivard.

Representing France, she won the bronze together with Lucie André and Valentine Derrey at the 2009 European Ladies' Team Championship, after beating a Spanish team with Carlota Ciganda in the consolation match.

== Professional career ==
Ricordeau turned professional in 2011 and joined the Ladies European Tour, but was unable to keep her card at the end of the season. In 2012, she played on the LET Access Series where she won the Terre Blanche Ladies Open and finished second in the Order of Merit, earning promotion back to the LET. From 2013 to 2016, she managed to finish in the top 100 on the LET, finishing a career best 22nd in 2014 thanks to a second place at the Xiamen Open International, 3 strokes behind Ssu-Chia Cheng.

At the end of 2015, she won a right to play on the LPGA Tour by finishing tied for 26th in the qualifying tournament. The results in 2016 (4 cuts in 14 tournaments, 143rd in the ranking) did not allow her to keep her card at the end of the season.

Ricordeau then played the Symetra Tour, where she finished runner-up at the PHC Classic and ranked 31st in 2017, and 95th in 2018. She decided to end her career after the 2018 Lacoste Ladies Open de France, where she sat in solo second place a stroke behind Nanna Koerstz Madsen ahead of the final round, but a disappointing 74 saw her finish tied 15th, six stroke behind winner Caroline Hedwall.

After retiring from tour, Ricordeau regained her amateur status and teamed up with her husband and former caddy Iñigo Ceballos to manage a golf course.

== Amateur wins ==
- 2008 French University Golf Championship
- 2008 World University Golf Championship
- 2023 Grand Prix D'Apremont

== Professional wins (6) ==
=== LET Access Series wins (1) ===
| No. | Date | Tournament | Winning score | To par | Margin of victory | Runner-up |
|---|---|---|---|---|---|---|
| 1 | 27 Sep 2012 | Terre Blanche Ladies Open | 70–73–68=211 | −5 | 3 strokes | (Australia) Rebecca Flood |

LET Access Series playoff record (0–1)

| No. | Year | Tournament | Opponent | Result |
|---|---|---|---|---|
| 1 | 2012 | Dinard Ladies Open | (Scotland) Carly Booth | Lost to birdie on first extra hole |

=== Banesto Golf Tour wins (2) ===
| No. | Date | Tournament | Winning score | Margin of victory | Runner-up |
|---|---|---|---|---|---|
| 1 | 23 Jul 2011 | Banesto Tour Asturias | 134 | 3 strokes | (Spain) Sara Beautell |
| 2 | 12 Oct 2012 | Banesto Tour Cantabria | 141 | Playoff | (Spain) María Hernández |

=== ALPG Tour wins (1) ===
- 2015 Renault Ladies Pro-Am

=== Other wins (2) ===
- 2014 Grand Prix Schweppes PGA France
- 2015 Grand Prix Schweppes PGA France

== Results in LPGA majors ==
Results not in chronological order.

| Tournament | 2014 | 2015 | 2016 | 2017 |
|---|---|---|---|---|
| Women's PGA Championship | | | CUT | |
| The Evian Championship | | | | CUT |
| Women's British Open | CUT | CUT | | |

Note: Ricordeau did not play in the ANA Inspiration or the U.S. Women's Open.

Did not play

CUT = missed the half-way cut

== Team appearances ==
Amateur

- Vagliano Trophy (representing the Continent of Europe): 2009 (winners)
- European Ladies' Team Championship (representing France): 2009, 2010
