= Bossey Ladies Championship =

Tournament information
- Location: Bossey, France
- Established: 2010
- Courses: Golf & Country Club de Bossey
- Tour: LET Access Series
- Format: 54-hole Stroke play
- Prize fund: €40,000
- Final year: 2019

Tournament record score
- Aggregate: 200 Hayley Davis
- To par: −13 Hayley Davis (2019) −13 Elia Folch (2018)

Final champion
- (England) Hayley Davis

The Bossey Ladies Championship was a women's professional golf tournament played as part of the LET Access Series, held between 2017 and 2019 in Bossey, France.

The tournament was part of a series of tournaments that served as the third stop in France on the LETAS schedule, after the Terre Blanche Ladies Open (the season opener since 2010) and Dinard Ladies Open (held 2010–2015). It was first played at Golf de La Nivelle in Saint-Jean-de-Luz near the Spanish border and San Sebastián, before moving to Golf de Fourqueux near Paris. In 2014, it moved to Strasbourg, and the last three installments were held at Golf & Country Club de Bossey on the Swiss border, near Geneva.

== Winners ==
| Year | Winner | Country | Score | Margin of victory | Runner(s)-up | Venue | Ref |
Bossey Ladies Championship
| 2019 | Hayley Davis | England | −13 (65-65-70=200) | 7 strokes | (France) Emma Grechi | Golf & Country Club de Bossey | |
| 2018 | Elia Folch | Spain | −13 (66-68-69=203) | 2 strokes | (France) Emilie Alonso | Golf & Country Club de Bossey | |
| 2017 | Jane Turner | Scotland | −7 (65-70-71=206) | Playoff | (Spain) Noemí Jiménez | Golf & Country Club de Bossey | |
NordicTrack Open de Strasbourg
| 2016 | Sanna Nuutinen | Finland | −12 (69-68-67=204) | 2 strokes | (England) Kiran Matharu | Golf Club de Strasbourg | |
Open Generali de Strasbourg
| 2015 | Oona Vartiainen | Finland | −12 (69-69-66=204) | 2 strokes | (France) Lucie André (England) Eleanor Givens | Golf Club de Strasbourg | |
| 2014 | Georgia Hall | England | −10 (66-72-68=206) | 4 strokes | (Belgium) Manon De Roey (a) (France) Cassandra Kirkland (Denmark) Daisy Nielsen | Golf Club de Strasbourg | |
Fourqueux Ladies Open
| 2013 | Cassandra Kirkland | France | −7 (69-68-72=209) | 4 strokes | (Spain) Patricia Sanz Barrio (a) (England) Charlotte Wild | Golf de Fourqueux | |
| 2012 | Caroline Afonso | France | −4 (71-71-70=212) | 5 strokes | (Scotland) Katy McNicoll | Golf de Fourqueux | |
La Nivelle Ladies Open
| 2011 | Anne-Lise Caudal | France | −6 (66-67-71=204) | 4 strokes | (France) Julie Maisongrosse | Golf de La Nivelle | |
| 2010 | Caroline Afonso | France | | 1 stroke | (Spain) Marina Arruti | Golf de La Nivelle | |
