= 2014 Ladies European Tour =

Professional women's golf tour

2014 Ladies European Tour season
- Duration: January 2014 – December 2014
- Number of official events: 23
- Most wins: (Scotland) Kylie Walker (2)
- Order of Merit: (England) Charley Hull
- Player of the Year: (England) Charley Hull
- Rookie of the Year: (Wales) Amy Boulden
- Lowest stroke average: (Norway) Suzann Pettersen

The 2014 Ladies European Tour is a series of golf tournaments for elite female golfers from around the world, which takes place from January through December 2014. The tournaments are sanctioned by the Ladies European Tour (LET).

== Schedule ==
The table below shows the 2014 schedule. The numbers in brackets after the winners' names indicate the career wins on the Ladies European Tour, including that event, and is only shown for members of the tour.

Key

Major championships
Regular events
Team championships

Date	Tournament	Host country	Winner	WWGR points	Purse (€)	Other tours (Note: ALPG − ALPG Tour, CLPGA − China LPGA Tour, JLPGA − LPGA of Japan Tour, KLPGA − LPGA of Korea Tour, LAGT − Ladies Asian Golf Tour, LPGA − LPGA Tour, SLT − Sunshine Ladies Tour.)	Notes
2 Feb	ISPS Handa New Zealand Women's Open	New Zealand	(South Korea) Mi Hyang Lee (n/a)	16.5	200,000	ALPG	
9 Feb	Volvik RACV Ladies Masters	Australia	(United States) Cheyenne Woods (1)	19	250,000	ALPG	
16 Feb	ISPS Handa Women's Australian Open	Australia	(Australia) Karrie Webb (n/a)	43	$1,200,000	ALPG, LPGA	
9 Mar	Mission Hills World Ladies Championship	China	(South Korea) Inbee Park (n/a)	20.5	$400,000	CLPGA	Individual event
16 Mar	Lalla Meryem Cup	Morocco	(England) Charley Hull (1)	15	450,000		
11 May	Turkish Airlines Ladies Open	Turkey	(France) Valentine Derrey (1)	15	250,000		
25 May	Deloitte Ladies Open	Netherlands	(Scotland) Kylie Walker (1)	15	250,000		
22 Jun	Allianz Ladies Slovak Open	Slovakia	(Sweden) Camilla Lennarth (1)	15	275,000		
29 Jun	Ladies Italian Open	Italy	(England) Florentyna Parker (2)	15	250,000		
6 Jul	ISPS Handa Ladies European Masters	England	(South Korea) Kim In-Kyung (2)	18.5	500,000		
13 Jul	Ricoh Women's British Open	England	(United States) Mo Martin (n/a)	100	$3,000,000	LPGA	
20 Jul	Ladies German Open	Germany	(Scotland) Kylie Walker (2)	15.5	250,000		
27 Jul	Sberbank Golf Masters	Czech Republic	(France) Julie Greciet (1)	15	250,000		
31 Aug	Aberdeen Asset Management Ladies Scottish Open	Scotland	(England) Trish Johnson (19)	15	300,000		
7 Sep	Helsingborg Open	Sweden	(Netherlands) Dewi Claire Schreefel (1)	15	250,000		
14 Sep	The Evian Championship	France	(South Korea) Kim Hyo-joo (n/a)	100	$3,250,000	LPGA	
21 Sep	Open De España Femenino	Spain	(South Africa) Connie Chen (1)	15	350,000		
5 Oct	Lacoste Ladies Open de France	France	(Spain) Azahara Muñoz (3)	15	250,000		
19 Oct	Cell C South African Women's Open	South Africa	(South Africa) Lee-Anne Pace (9)	15	320,000	SLT	
16 Nov	Sanya Ladies Open	China	(China) Xi Yu Lin (1)	15	300,000	CLPGA, LAGT	
23 Nov	Xiamen Open International	China	(Taiwan) Ssu-chia Cheng (1)	15	250,000	CLPGA	
6 Dec	Hero Women's Indian Open	India	(France) Gwladys Nocera (13)	15	$300,000	LAGT	
13 Dec	Omega Dubai Ladies Masters	United Arab Emirates	(China) Shanshan Feng (3)	19	500,000		

=== Unofficial events ===
The following events appear on the schedule, but do not carry official money or Order of Merit ranking points.

Date	Tournament	Host country	Winners	WWGR points	Purse	Other tours	Notes
9 Mar	Mission Hills World Ladies Championship	China	(South Korea) Inbee Park & Ryu So-yeon	–	$100,000	CLPGA	Team event

== Order of Merit rankings ==
Rank	Player	Country	Earnings (€)
1	Charley Hull	England	263,097
2	Gwladys Nocera	France	233,289
3	Lee-Anne Pace	South Africa	167,006
4	Nikki Campbell	Australia	162,545
5	Carlota Ciganda	Spain	140,730
6	Holly Clyburn	England	126,473
7	Valentine Derrey	France	121,852
8	Beth Allen	United States	110,159
9	Florentyna Parker	England	107,331
10	Laura Davies	England	106,565

== Location of tournaments ==
Location of tournaments in Europe.
Major championship
National open
Regular event
Location of tournaments outside Europe.
National open
Regular event
Team event

== See also ==
- 2014 LPGA Tour
- 2014 LET Access Series
