= 2014 Evian Championship =

Coordinates: 46.394°N 6.570°E

Tournament information
- Dates: 11–14 September 2014
- Location: Évian-les-Bains, France
- Course: Evian Resort Golf Club
- Tour(s): Ladies European Tour; LPGA Tour

Statistics
- Par: 71
- Length: 6,453 yards (5,901 m)
- Field: 120 players, 72 after cut
- Cut: 147 (+5)
- Prize fund: $3,250,000 €2,407,470
- Winner's share: $487,500 €361,120

Champion
- (South Korea) Kim Hyo-joo
- 273 (−11)

Location in France

The 2014 Evian Championship was played 11–14 September at the Evian Resort Golf Club in Évian-les-Bains, France. It was the 21st Evian Championship (the first 19 played as the Evian Masters), and the second as a major championship on the LPGA Tour. The event was televised by Golf Channel and NBC Sports in the United States and Sky Sports in the United Kingdom.

Kim Hyo-joo, age 19, shot an opening round 61 (−10) and held on to total 273 (−11), one stroke ahead of runner-up Karrie Webb. Trailing by a stroke at the final tee, Kim sank a 12-foot (3.7 m) putt for birdie while Webb failed to par from the same distance to force a playoff. It was Kim's first win on the LPGA Tour and she became the third-youngest in history to win a women's major title.

== Field ==
The field for the tournament was set at 120, and most earned exemptions based on past performance on the Ladies European Tour, the LPGA Tour, or with a high ranking in the Women's World Golf Rankings.

There were 12 exemption categories for the 2014 Evian Championship.

1. The top 40 in the Women's World Golf Rankings, as of 12 August 2014

- Chella Choi (7,12), Na Yeon Choi (12), Chun In-gee, Paula Creamer (2,4,12), Shanshan Feng (4,6,12), Caroline Hedwall (12), Charley Hull (5,6), Karine Icher (12), Jang Ha-na, Cristie Kerr (12), Kim Hyo-joo, I.K. Kim (5,12), Lydia Ko (4,7,12), Jessica Korda (4,12), Meena Lee (12), Mirim Lee (4,12), Stacy Lewis (4,7,12), Catriona Matthew (12), Azahara Muñoz (5,12), Anna Nordqvist (4,12), Se Ri Pak (7,12), Hee Young Park (12), Inbee Park (2,3,4,12), Suzann Pettersen (2,4,6,7,12), Pornanong Phatlum (5,12), Gerina Piller (12), Beatriz Recari (7,12), So Yeon Ryu (4,7,12), Lizette Salas (4,12), Jenny Shin (12), Angela Stanford (7,12), Lexi Thompson (3,4,7,12), Karrie Webb (2,4,5,12), Michelle Wie (3,4,12), Amy Yang (4,12), Sakura Yokomine
- Eligible but did not play: Sun-Ju Ahn, Lee Bo-mee, Mo Martin (3,4,5,12), Jiyai Shin (2)

2. Active Evian Masters Champions

- Laura Davies (12), Juli Inkster (12), Ai Miyazato (12)
- Eligible but did not play: Natalie Gulbis

3. Winners of the 2014 majors (2014 Kraft Nabisco Championship, 2014 U.S. Women's Open, 2014 Women's British Open, 2014 LPGA Championship)

- All players already qualified in other categories.

4. LPGA Tour winners since 2013 Evian

- Austin Ernst (12)
- Eligible but did not play: Teresa Lu

5. Ladies European Tour (LET) winners since 2013 Evian

- Valentine Derrey, Julie Greciet, Trish Johnson, Mi Hyang Lee (12), Camilla Lennarth, Gwladys Nocera (6), Lee-Anne Pace (12), Florentyna Parker, Dewi Claire Schreefel (12), Thidapa Suwannapura (12), Kylie Walker, Cheyenne Woods

6. The top 5 on the LET Order of Merit, as of commitment date

- Nikki Campbell

7. Top 10 and ties from the 2013 Evian Championship

- Jennifer Johnson (12)

8. 2014 U.S. Women's Amateur champion

- Kristen Gillman (a)

9. 2014 British Ladies Amateur champion

- Emily Kristine Pedersen

10. Evian invitations (four)

- Caroline Afonso, Céline Boutier (a), Joanna Klatten (12), Minjee Lee

11. Evian Pre-qualifiers

- Ariane Provot, Jing Yan (a)

12. LPGA Tour money list, as of commitment date

- Marina Alex, Amy Anderson, Christel Boeljon, Katie Burnett, Dori Carter, Carlota Ciganda, Laura Diaz, Paz Echeverria, Jodi Ewart Shadoff, Sandra Gal, Julieta Granada, Jaye Marie Green, Mina Harigae, Mi Jung Hur, Eun-Hee Ji, Tiffany Joh, Moriya Jutanugarn, Danielle Kang, Haeji Kang, Kim Kaufman, Sarah Kemp, Christina Kim, Katherine Kirk, Patcharajutar Kongkraphan, Candie Kung, Brittany Lang, Ilhee Lee, Jee Young Lee, Amelia Lewis, Xi Yu Lin, Brittany Lincicome, Pernilla Lindberg, Alejandra Llaneza, Caroline Masson, Kristy McPherson, Sydnee Michaels, Mika Miyazato, Belen Mozo, Haru Nomura, Ji Young Oh, Brooke Pancake, Jane Park, Morgan Pressel, Jennifer Rosales, Giulia Sergas, Alena Sharp, Ashleigh Simon, Sarah Jane Smith, Jennifer Song, Kris Tamulis, Kelly Tan, Yani Tseng, Ayako Uehara, Mariajo Uribe, Line Vedel, Alison Walshe, Lindsey Wright, Sun Young Yoo
- Eligible but did not play: Yueer Cindy Feng

== Course ==
Hole	1	2	3	4	5	6	7	8	9	Out	10	11	12	13	14	15	16	17	18	In	Total
Par	4	3	4	4	3	4	5	3	5	35	4	4	4	5	3	5	3	4	4	36	71
Yards	399	165	355	414	188	384	545	189	481	3,120	417	353	401	499	209	527	155	331	441	3,333	6,453
Metres	365	151	325	379	172	351	498	173	440	2,853	381	323	367	456	191	482	142	303	403	3,048	5,901

== Round summaries ==
=== First round ===
Thursday, 11 September 2014

Place	Player	Score	To par
1	(South Korea) Kim Hyo-joo	61	−10
2	(Australia) Karrie Webb	65	−6
3	(South Korea) Mi Jung Hur	66	−5
T4	(United States) Brittany Lincicome	67	−4
T4	(Norway) Suzann Pettersen	67	−4
T6	(Paraguay) Julieta Granada	68	−3
T6	(France) Karine Icher	68	−3
T6	(Netherlands) Dewi Claire Schreefel	68	−3
T6	(Australia) Sarah Jane Smith	68	−3
T6	(Colombia) Mariajo Uribe	68	−3
T6	(South Korea) Amy Yang	68	−3

=== Second round ===
Friday, 12 September 2014

Place	Player	Score	To par
1	(United States) Brittany Lincicome	67-65=132	−10
2	(South Korea) Kim Hyo-joo	61-72=133	−9
3	(South Korea) Mi Jung Hur	66-69=135	−7
T4	(Norway) Suzann Pettersen	67-69=136	−6
T4	(Australia) Karrie Webb	65-71=136	−6
T6	(Thailand) Moriya Jutanugarn	69-68=137	−5
T6	(New Zealand) Lydia Ko	69-68=137	−5
T6	(United States) Stacy Lewis	70-67=137	−5
T9	(South Korea) I. K. Kim	69-69=138	−4
T9	(Sweden) Anna Nordqvist	71-67=138	−4
T9	(Colombia) Mariajo Uribe	68-70=138	−4
T9	(South Korea) Amy Yang	68-70=138	−4

=== Third round ===
Saturday, 13 September 2014

Place	Player	Score	To par
1	(South Korea) Kim Hyo-joo	61-72-72=205	−8
2	(Australia) Karrie Webb	65-71-70=206	−7
3	(South Korea) Mi Jung Hur	66-69-72=207	−6
T4	(Sweden) Anna Nordqvist	71-67-70=208	−5
T4	(Colombia) Mariajo Uribe	68-70-70=208	−5
T6	(South Korea) Na Yeon Choi	70-72-67=209	−4
T6	(South Korea) Jang Ha-na	70-71-68=209	−4
T6	(New Zealand) Lydia Ko	69-68-72=209	−4
T6	(United States) Brittany Lincicome	67-65-77=209	−4
T10	(United States) Stacy Lewis	70-67-73=210	−3
T10	(South Korea) Inbee Park	69-72-69=210	−3
T10	(Norway) Suzann Pettersen	67-69-74=210	−3

=== Final round ===
Sunday, 14 September 2014

Place	Player	Score	To par	Money ($)
1	(South Korea) Kim Hyo-joo	61-72-72-68=273	−11	487,500
2	(Australia) Karrie Webb	65-71-70-68=274	−10	303,188
T3	(South Korea) Mi Jung Hur	66-69-72-68=275	−9	195,042
T3	(South Korea) Jang Ha-na	70-71-68-66=275	−9	195,042
5	(South Korea) Na Yeon Choi	70-72-67-67=276	−8	136,946
6	(Norway) Suzann Pettersen	67-69-74-67=277	−7	112,046
7	(United States) Paula Creamer	69-71-72-66=278	−6	93,787
T8	(New Zealand) Lydia Ko	69-68-72-71=280	−4	78,018
T8	(United States) Brittany Lincicome	67-65-77-71=280	−4	78,018
T10	(China) Shanshan Feng	70-70-73-69=282	−2	56,880
T10	(Thailand) Moriya Jutanugarn	69-68-75-70=282	−2	56,880
T10	(Sweden) Anna Nordqvist	71-67-70-74=282	−2	56,880
T10	(South Korea) Inbee Park	69-72-69-72=282	−2	56,880
T10	(United States) Lexi Thompson	70-70-71-71=282	−2	56,880
T10	(Colombia) Mariajo Uribe	68-70-70-74=282	−2	56,880

==== Scorecard ====
Final round

Hole	1	2	3	4	5	6	7	8	9	10	11	12	13	14	15	16	17	18
Par	4	3	4	4	3	4	5	3	5	4	4	4	5	3	5	3	4	4
(South Korea) Kim	−8	−9	−9	−9	−9	−9	−9	−9	−10	−10	−11	−12	−12	−11	−11	−10	−10	−11
(Australia) Webb	−8	−6	−6	−6	−6	−6	−6	−6	−7	−8	−9	−9	−9	−10	−11	−11	−11	−10
(South Korea) Hur	−6	−6	−6	−7	−7	−7	−7	−7	−7	−7	−7	−7	−9	−9	−10	−10	−9	−9
(South Korea) Jang	−3	−4	−4	−5	−6	−6	−7	−7	−7	−7	−7	−7	−8	−9	−10	−10	−10	−9

Cumulative tournament scores, relative to par
