= 2012 LET Access Series =

Professional women's golf tour

2012 LET Access Series season
- Duration: 14 March 2012 – 10 November 2012
- Number of official events: 13
- Most wins: 2: (Norway) Cecilie Lundgreen
- Order of Merit: (Scotland) Pamela Pretswell

The 2012 LET Access Series was a series of professional women's golf tournaments held from March through November 2012 across Europe. The LET Access Series is the second-tier women's professional golf tour in Europe and is the official developmental tour of the Ladies European Tour.

== Tournament results ==
The table below shows the 2012 schedule. The numbers in brackets after the winners' names show the number of career wins they had on the LET Access Series up to and including that event.

Dates	Tournament	Location	Prize fund (€)	Winner
14–16 Mar	Terre Blanche Ladies Open	France	25,000	(France) Marion Ricordeau (1)
12–14 Apr	Dinard Ladies Open	France	25,000	(Scotland) Carly Booth (1)
19–21 Apr	Banesto Tour Zaragoza	Spain	20,000	(Netherlands) Marjet van der Graaff (1)
10–12 May	Kristianstad Åhus Ladies Open	Sweden	30,000	(Norway) Cecilie Lundgreen (1)
16–18 May	Ljungbyhed Park PGA Ladies Open	Sweden	30,000	(Scotland) Pamela Pretswell (1)
22–24 May	GolfStream Ladies Open	Ukraine	20,000	(Russia) Anastasia Kostina (1)
4–6 Jul	Ladies Norwegian Challenge	Norway	25,000	(Norway) Marianne Skarpnord (1)
9–11 Aug	Women's Bank Open	Finland	30,000	(Norway) Cecilie Lundgreen (2)
16–18 Aug	Samsø Ladies Open	Denmark	20,000	(Sweden) Antonella Cvitan (1)
13–15 Sep	Fourqueux Ladies Open	France	25,000	(France) Caroline Afonso (3)
5–7 Oct	Azores Ladies Open	Portugal	25,000	(Italy) Anna Rossi (1)
28–30 Oct	Crete Ladies Open	Greece	25,000	(Austria) Christine Wolf (1)
8–10 Nov	Banesto Tour Valencia	Spain	20,000	(England) Holly Clyburn (1)

== Order of Merit rankings ==
The top three players on the Order of Merit earned LET membership for the Ladies European Tour. Players finishing in positions 4–20 got to skip the first stage of the qualifying event and automatically progress to the final stage of the Lalla Aicha Tour School.

Rank	Player	Country	Events	Points	Status earned
1	Pamela Pretswell	Scotland	12	19,372	Promoted to LET
2	Marion Ricordeau	France	12	18,946	Promoted to LET
3	Cecilie Lundgreen	Norway	9	15,277	Promoted to LET
4	Katy McNicoll	Scotland	13	15,165	
5	Julie Tvede	Denmark	13	12,028	
6	Antonella Cvitan	Sweden	11	10,735	
7	Anastasia Kostina	Russia	12	10,083	
8	Viva Schlasberg	Sweden	13	9,964	
9	Tamara Johns	Australia	10	9,790	
10	Pamela Feggans	Scotland	10	9,580	

== See also ==
- 2012 Ladies European Tour
- 2012 in golf
