= Dinard Ladies Open =

Tournament information
- Location: Saint-Briac-sur-Mer, Brittany, France
- Established: 2010
- Course: Dinard Golf Club
- Tour: LET Access Series
- Format: 54-hole Stroke play
- Prize fund: €30,000
- Final year: 2015

Tournament record score
- Aggregate: 201 Valentine Derrey
- To par: –9 Sophie Giquel-Bettan

Final champion
- (France) Sophie Giquel-Bettan

The Dinard Ladies Open was a women's professional golf tournament played as part of the LET Access Series, held between 2010 and 2015 in Saint-Briac-sur-Mer, Brittany, France.

The tournament was played at the Dinard course, the second oldest in France after Pau, and one of the oldest in continental Europe. Laid out along the English Channel with sea views from all 18 holes, it was founded in 1887 by a small colony of British residents.

In 2012 Carly Booth won the tournament in a playoff for her first professional victory, before she went on to claim two further wins on the LET, where she finished the year 5th on the Order of Merit.

== Winners ==
Year	Winner	Country	Score	Margin of victory	Runner(s)-up	Ref
Open Generali de Dinard
2015	Sophie Giquel-Bettan	France	−9 (70-66-71=207)	1 stroke	(Spain) Virginia Espejo	
2014	Valentine Derrey	France	−6 (66-69-66=201)	2 strokes	(Sweden) Isabella Ramsay	
Dinard Ladies Open
2013	Monica Christiansen	Denmark	−1 (69-68=137)^	2 strokes	(France) Caroline Afonso (Germany) Ann-Kathrin Lindner (Netherlands) Chrisje De Vries	
2012	Carly Booth	Scotland	−1 (69-70-67=206)	Playoff	(France) Marion Ricordeau	
2011	Julie Maisongrosse	France				
2010	Jade Schaeffer	France				

^Shortened to 36 holes due to weather
