= 2010 Espirito Santo Trophy =

Tournament information
- Dates: 20–23 October
- Location: Buenos Aires, Argentina; 34.467°S 58.699°W
- Courses: Olivos Golf Club; Buenos Aires Golf Club
- Organized by: International Golf Federation
- Format: 72 holes stroke play

Statistics
- Par: Olivos: 72; Buenos Aires: 72
- Length: Olivos: 6,110 yards (5,590 m); Buenos Aires: 6,110 yards (5,590 m)
- Field: 52 teams 155 players

Champion
- South Korea; Han Jung-eun, Kim Hyun-soo, Kim Ji-hee
- 546 (−30)
- Location in South America Location in Argentina Location in Buenos Aires Province

The 2010 Espirito Santo Trophy took place 20–23 October at the Olivos Golf Club and Buenos Aires Golf Club in Buenos Aires, Argentina.

It was the 24th women's golf World Amateur Team Championship for the Espirito Santo Trophy.

The tournament was a 72-hole stroke play team event. There were a record 52 team entries, each with two or three players.

Each team played two rounds at Olivos and two rounds at Buenos Aires. The best two scores for each round counted towards the team total.

South Korea won the Trophy for their second title, with a record 30-under-par score of 546, 17 strokes ahead of silver medalist team United States. Defending champion team Sweden shared the bronze medal with France and South Africa on third place, another five strokes back.

The individual leaderboard was headed by the three South Korean players, with Han Jung-eun on top, scoring 275, 13 under par. The third South Korean player was individually five strokes ahead of the best player of any other team. If the South Korean team would have been forced to count the two worst scores in each round, they would still have won the team competition with five strokes.

Chloé Leurquin, Belgium, made a hole-in-one in the fourth round on the 7th hole at Olivos Golf Club from 162 yards.

== Teams ==
52 teams entered the event and completed the competition. Each team had three players, except team Tanzania, which only had two.

| Country | Players |
|---|---|
| Argentina | Manuela Carbajo Re, Martina Gavier, Victoria Tanco |
| Australia | Julia Boland, Stacey Keating, Alison Whitaker |
| Austria | Stefanie Endstrasser, Sarah Schober, Marina Stuetz |
| Belgium | Laura Gonzalez Escallon, Chloé Leurquin, Margaux Vanmol |
| Bolivia | Susana Benavides, Raquel Gumucio, Natalia Perez |
| Brazil | Mariana de Biase, Patricia Carvalho, Isadora Stapff |
| Canada | Sara-Maude Juneau, Jennifer Kirby, Christine Wong |
| Czech Republic | Adéla Cejnarová, Klára Spilková, Karolina Vlckova |
| Chile | Paz Echeverría, Maria José Hurtado, Macarena Silva |
| China | Ying Luo, Zhou Ying Qing Luo, Yuyang Zhang |
| Chinese Taipei | Liu Yi-chen, Hsu Ke-hui, Yao Hsuan-yu |
| Colombia | Laura Blanco, Juliana Murcia, Lisa McCloskey |
| Denmark | Line Vedel Hansen, Therese Köelbaek, Charlotte Lorentzen |
| Ecuador | Coralía Arias, Daniela Darquea, Maria José Ferro |
| England | Hannah Burke, Holly Clyburn, Kelly Tidy |
| Finland | Linda Henriksson, Sanna Nuutinen, Noora Tamminen |
| France | Lucie André, Alexandra Bonetti, Manon Gidali |
| Germany | Pia Halbig, Lara Katzy, Sophia Popov |
| Guam | Tessie Blair, Rose Cunliffe, Aiga Payne |
| Guatemala | Beatriz de Arenas, María José Camey, Lucía Polo |
| Hong Kong | Tiffany Chan, Michelle Cheung, Stephanie Ho |
| Iceland | Signy Arnorsdottir, Gudrun Bjorgvinsdottir, Tinna Johannsdottir |
| Ireland | Leona Maguire, Lisa Maguire, Danielle McVeigh |
| Israel | Laetitia Beck, Petra Bogoslavsky, Hadas Libman |
| Italy | Alessandra Averna, Giulia Molinaro, Anna Roscio |
| Japan | Mami Fukuda, Mamiko Higa, Natsuka Hori |
| Latvia | Laura Jansone, Krista Puisite, Mara Puisite |
| Malaysia | Vivienne Chin, Dianne Luke, Iman Nordin |
| Mexico | Gabriela Lopez, Marijosse Navarro, Paola Valerio |
| Netherlands | Myrte Eikenaar, Marieke Nivard, Karlijn Zaanen |
| New Zealand | Caroline Bon, Cecilia Cho, Lydia Ko |
| Norway | Tonje Daffinrud, Marita Engzelius, Rachel Raastad |
| Paraguay | Johanna Doria, Diana Fernández, Paloma Vaccaro |
| Peru | Alexandra Gibson, Kiara Hayashida, Maria Salinas |
| Philippines | Dottie Ardina, Chihiro Ikeda, Mia Piccio |
| Portugal | Magda Carrilho, Joana Pinto, Marta Vasconcelos |
| Puerto Rico | Patricia Garcia, Kyle Roig, María Fernanda Torres |
| Scotland | Louise Kenney, Kelsey MacDonald, Sally Watson |
| Slovakia | Lujza Bubanova, Natalia Heckova, Victoria Tomko |
| Slovenia | Ursa Orehek, Katja Pogačar, Tajda Sarkanj |
| South Africa | Connie Chen, Kelli Shean, Kim Williams |
| South Korea | Han Jung-eun, Kim Hyun-soo, Kim Ji-hee |
| Spain | Carlota Ciganda, Mireia Prat, Marta Silva Zamora |
| Sweden | Caroline Hedwall, Louise Larsson, Camilla Lennarth |
| Switzerland | Melanie Mätzler, Anais Maggetti, Fanny Vuignier |
| Tanzania | Madina Iddy Hussein, Hawa Ayoub Wanyeche |
| Trinidad and Tobago | Tracey Clarke, Martine de Gannes, Monifa Sealy |
| Turkey | Basak Aydin, Damla Bilgic, Sena Ersoy |
| United States | Cydney Clanton, Danielle Kang, Jessica Korda |
| Uruguay | Manuela Barros, Maria Victoria Fernández, Maria Garcia Austt |
| Wales | Gemma Bradbury, Amy Boulden, Tara Davies |
| Venezuela | Nicole Ferré, Ana Margarita Raga, Fabiana Salazar |

== Results ==
| Place | Country | Score | To par |
|---|---|---|---|
| 1st place, gold medalist(s) | South Korea | 145-128-134-139=546 | −30 |
| 2nd place, silver medalist(s) | United States | 136-138-146-143=563 | −13 |
| 3rd place, bronze medalist(s) | France | 140-144-141-147=572 | −4 |
| 3rd place, bronze medalist(s) | South Africa | 142-139-143-148=572 | −4 |
| 3rd place, bronze medalist(s) | Sweden | 146-135-145-146=572 | −4 |
| 6 | Spain | 142-145-138-148=573 | −3 |
| 7 | Canada | 144-138-149-143=574 | −2 |
| T8 | Germany | 142-135-146-152=575 | −1 |
| T8 | New Zealand | 148-140-145-142=575 | −1 |
| T8 | Philippines | 144-135-151-145=575 | −1 |
| T11 | Denmark | 145-140-145-142=577 | +1 |
| T11 | Ireland | 144-143-147-143=577 | +1 |
| T13 | Argentina | 140-141-144-153=578 | +2 |
| T13 | Mexico | 143-138-149-148=578 | +2 |
| T15 | Australia | 147-146-142-145=580 | +4 |
| T15 | China | 145-144-142-149=580 | +4 |
| T17 | Colombia | 150-143-141-147=581 | +5 |
| T17 | Wales | 149-147-143-142=581 | +5 |
| 19 | Austria | 149-144-146-143=582 | +6 |
| T20 | Chinese Taipei | 142-147-146-148=583 | +7 |
| T20 | Netherlands | 149-141-147-146=583 | +7 |
| T20 | Puerto Rico | 149-141-149-144=583 | +7 |
| 23 | Norway | 149-144-142-149=584 | +8 |
| 24 | Japan | 146-139-147-153=585 | +9 |
| 25 | England | 151-142-145-148=586 | +10 |
| 26 | Italy | 150-143-145-149=587 | +11 |
| 27 | Belgium | 148-141-151-149=589 | +13 |
| T28 | Chile | 146-150-148-146=590 | +14 |
| T28 | Scotland | 151-143-148-148=590 | +14 |
| 30 | Slovenia | 148-148-154-141=591 | +15 |
| 31 | Switzerland | 148-151-145-148=592 | +16 |
| 32 | Czech Republic | 152-141-156-147=596 | +20 |
| 33 | Portugal | 154-146-150-151=601 | +25 |
| 34 | Finland | 159-146-153-145=603 | +27 |
| T35 | Paraguay | 149-153-155-147=604 | +28 |
| T35 | Peru | 154-148-154-148=604 | +28 |
| 37 | Malaysia | 159-151-147-148=605 | +29 |
| T38 | Israel | 144-161-149-152=606 | +30 |
| T38 | Trinidad and Tobago | 155-145-159-147=606 | +30 |
| T38 | Venezuela | 153-147-156-150=606 | +30 |
| 41 | Hong Kong | 157-151-154-145=607 | +31 |
| T42 | Brazil | 153-154-152-150=609 | +33 |
| T42 | Iceland | 155-152-151-151=609 | +33 |
| 44 | Bolivia | 153-155-153-150=611 | +35 |
| 45 | Latvia | 156-147-156-153=612 | +36 |
| 46 | Guatemala | 150-162-153-148=613 | +37 |
| 47 | Uruguay | 154-155-155-156=620 | +44 |
| 48 | Ecuador | 154-158-164-152=628 | +52 |
| 49 | Slovakia | 154-162-158-155=629 | +53 |
| 50 | Turkey | 159-161-165-159=644 | +68 |
| 51 | Tanzania | 174-166-170-164=674 | +98 |
| 52 | Guam | 183-182-182-184=731 | +155 |

== Individual leaders ==
There was no official recognition for the lowest individual scores.

| Place | Player | Country | Score | To par |
|---|---|---|---|---|
| 1 | Han Jung-eun | South Korea | 72-65-68-70=275 | −13 |
| 2 | Kim Ji-hee | South Korea | 75-63-68-71=277 | −11 |
| 3 | Kim Hyun-soo | South Korea | 73-70-66-69=278 | −10 |
| T4 | Amy Boulden | Wales | 72-72-69-70=283 | −5 |
| T4 | Jessica Korda | United States | 68-68-73-76=283 | −5 |
| T4 | Kelli Shean | South Africa | 70-69-72-72=283 | −5 |
| 7 | Christine Wong | Canada | 70-67-76-72=285 | −3 |
| T8 | Dottie Ardina | Philippines | 73-65-77-71=286 | −2 |
| T8 | Manuela Carbajo Re | Argentina | 70-67-73-76=286 | −2 |
| T8 | Cydney Clanton | United States | 68-72-73-73=286 | −2 |
| T8 | Danielle Kang | United States | 70-73-73-70=286 | −2 |
| T8 | Lisa McCloskey | Colombia | 74-70-69-73=286 | −2 |
