= 2021 Women's PGA Championship =

2021 KPMG Women's PGA Championship

Tournament information
- Dates: June 24–27, 2021
- Location: Johns Creek, Georgia; 34.004°N 84.192°W
- Courses: Atlanta Athletic Club (Highlands course)
- Organized by: PGA of America
- Tour: LPGA Tour
- Format: Stroke play - 72 holes

Statistics
- Par: 72
- Length: 6,740 yards (6,163 m)
- Field: 156 players, 70 after cut
- Cut: 146 (+2)
- Prize fund: $4.5 million
- Winner's share: $675,000

Champion
- (United States) Nelly Korda
- 269 (−19)
- Location in the United States Location in Georgia

The 2021 KPMG Women's PGA Championship was the 67th Women's PGA Championship, played June 24–27 at Atlanta Athletic Club in Johns Creek, Georgia. Known as the LPGA Championship through 2014, it was the third of five major championships on the LPGA Tour during the 2021 season.

The championship was won by Nelly Korda with an aggregate of 269, which was a tournament record tying to-par total of 19 under. She finished three strokes ahead of runner-up Lizette Salas, and a further six strokes ahead of Kim Hyo-joo and Giulia Molinaro, who tied for third place.

== Round summaries ==
=== First round ===
Thursday, June 24, 2021

Place	Player	Score	To par
1	(United States) Lizette Salas	67	−5
2	(England) Charley Hull	68	−4
T3	(United States) Austin Ernst	69	−3
T3	(Sweden) Daniela Holmqvist	69	−3
T3	(United States) Jessica Korda	69	−3
T3	(South Korea) Lee Jeong-eun	69	−3
T3	(China) Lin Xiyu	69	−3
T3	(United States) Yealimi Noh	69	−3
T3	(Canada) Alena Sharp	69	−3
T10	(Philippines) Dottie Ardina	70	−2
T10	(South Korea) Chella Choi	70	−2
T10	(South Korea) Chun In-gee	70	−2
T10	(United States) Cydney Clanton	70	−2
T10	(Mexico) María Fassi	70	−2
T10	(United States) Mina Harigae	70	−2
T10	(Thailand) Ariya Jutanugarn	70	−2
T10	(United States) Nelly Korda	70	−2
T10	(Denmark) Nanna Koerstz Madsen	70	−2
T10	(Italy) Giulia Molinaro	70	−2
T10	(United States) Gerina Piller	70	−2
T10	(Sweden) Madelene Sagström	70	−2
T10	(Thailand) Patty Tavatanakit	70	−2

=== Second round ===
Friday, June 25, 2021

After the second round, the leading 70 players made the cut, which fell at 146 (2 over par).

Place	Player	Score	To par
1	(United States) Nelly Korda	70-63=133	−11
2	(United States) Lizette Salas	67-67=134	−10
T3	(France) Céline Boutier	73-64=137	−7
T3	(United States) Cydney Clanton	70-67=137	−7
T3	(Canada) Alena Sharp	69-68=137	−7
6	(Sweden) Madelene Sagström	70-68=138	−6
T7	(Germany) Esther Henseleit	71-68=139	−5
T7	(England) Charley Hull	68-71=139	−5
T7	(South Korea) Inbee Park	71-68=139	−5
T10	(Philippines) Dottie Ardina	70-70=140	−4
T10	(United States) Austin Ernst	69-71=140	−4
T10	(United States) Danielle Kang	73-67=140	−4
T10	(United States) Mina Harigae	70-70=140	−4
T10	(South Korea) Kim Hyo-joo	71-69=140	−4
T10	(China) Lin Xiyu	69-71=140	−4
T10	(Thailand) Wichanee Meechai	73-67=140	−4
T10	(Italy) Giulia Molinaro	70-70=140	−4
T10	(United States) Ryann O'Toole	71-69=140	−4

=== Third round ===
Saturday, June 26, 2021

Place	Player	Score	To par
T1	(United States) Nelly Korda	70-63-68=201	−15
T1	(United States) Lizette Salas	67-67-67=201	−15
T3	(France) Céline Boutier	73-64-69=206	−10
T3	(Italy) Giulia Molinaro	70-70-66=206	−10
T3	(Thailand) Patty Tavatanakit	70-71-65=206	−10
6	(Philippines) Dottie Ardina	70-70-68=208	−8
T7	(Germany) Esther Henseleit	71-68-70=209	−7
T7	(Sweden) Madelene Sagström	70-68-71=209	−7
T9	(South Korea) Kim Hyo-joo	71-69-70=210	−6
T9	(China) Lin Xiyu	69-71-70=210	−6

=== Final round ===
Sunday, June 27, 2021

Place	Player	Score	To par	Money ($)
1	(United States) Nelly Korda	70-63-68-68=269	−19	675,000
2	(United States) Lizette Salas	67-67-67-71=272	−16	418,716
T3	(South Korea) Kim Hyo-joo	71-69-70-68=278	−10	269,361
T3	(Italy) Giulia Molinaro	70-70-66-72=278	−10	269,361
T5	(United States) Danielle Kang	73-67-73-67=280	−8	171,934
T5	(Thailand) Patty Tavatanakit	70-71-65-74=280	−8	171,934
T7	(France) Céline Boutier	73-64-69-75=281	−7	121,501
T7	(United States) Austin Ernst	69-71-71-70=281	−7	121,501
T9	(United States) Cydney Clanton	70-67-75-70=282	−6	93,608
T9	(China) Lin Xiyu	69-71-70-72=282	−6	93,608
T9	(South Korea) Amy Yang	72-72-74-64=282	−6	93,608
