= Kelli Shean =

South African golfer

Kelli Shean Rackley
Personal information
- Nickname: Kellogs
- Nationality: South Africa
- Born: 10 September 1987 (age 39) Cape Town, South Africa
- Height: 5 ft 7 in (1.70 m)
- Spouse: Chandler Rackley

Career
- Sport: Golf
- College: University of Arkansas
- Turned professional: 2011

Best results in LPGA major championships
- Chevron Championship: DNP
- Women's PGA C'ship: DNP
- U.S. Women's Open: T65: 2010
- Women's British Open: DNP

Kelli Shean Rackley (born 10 September 1987) is a golfer from South Africa. She graduated from the University of Arkansas in 2011. She married Chandler Rackley of Little Rock, Arkansas, in June 2011. They moved back to Little Rock, where she currently coaches at her own Academy, "More Than a Game Golf Academy".

== History and family ==
Shean was born in Cape Town, South Africa to Stephen and Dianne Shean. She has two older brothers, Gary and Trevor, and an older sister, Desray.

== Amateur career ==
Shean had a successful amateur career in South Africa.

In 2005, she achieved the following:

- Finished 2nd along with Ashleigh Simon in the Spirit International Team Championships in Women's Division
- Runner-up as South African Team in the World Division
- Runner-up South African Amateur Stroke Play Championships
- Won South Africa Amateur Match Play Championships
- Won Order of Merit for Ernie Els Junior Tour with 2 wins, 3 runners-up, and one 3rd-place finish

In 2006, she won all of the following:

- World Amateur Team Championships
- Gauteng Open Match Play Championships
- Southern Cape Open Championships
- Kwa-Zulu Natal Open Championships by a record 11 shots
- Western Province Open Championships by a record 12 shots

== Collegiate career ==
Shean came to the University of Arkansas on a golf scholarship in 2007 and participated in every tournament while attending the university. Her first collegiate win came in 2009 at Marilynn Smith Sunflower Invitational in Kansas where she finished 7 under par.

== Professional career ==
Shean participated in her first LPGA event in September 2009 as an amateur. She tied for 27th in the P&G Beauty NW Arkansas Championship.

Shean competed in the 2010 U.S. Women's Open as her second professional event, placing 65th. She was leading the majority of the first round, where she gained most of her publicity.

== Team appearances ==
Amateur

- Espirito Santo Trophy (representing South Africa): 2006 (winners), 2010
