= Laura Gonzalez Escallon =

Belgian professional golfer

Personal information
- Nationality: Belgium
- Born: 6 October 1990 (age 36) Bogotá, Colombia
- Height: 5 ft 7 in (1.70 m)

Career
- Sport: Golf
- College: Purdue University
- Turned professional: 2014
- Former tours: LPGA Tour (joined 2017); Symetra Tour (joined 2014)
- Professional wins: 2

Number of wins by tour
- Epson Tour: 2

Best results in LPGA major championships
- Chevron Championship: T60: 2017
- Women's PGA C'ship: T70: 2017
- U.S. Women's Open: CUT: 2017
- Women's British Open: T63: 2017
- Evian Championship: T55: 2016

Achievements and awards
- Big Ten Conference Freshman of the Year: 2010
- Big Ten Conference Golfer of the Year: 2012
- Mary Fossum Award: 2012
- Purdue Athletics Hall of Fame: 2024

Laura Gonzalez Escallon (born 6 October 1990) is a retired Belgian professional golfer who played on the LPGA Tour and the Symetra Tour.

== Early life and amateur career ==
Gonzalez was born in Bogotá, Colombia and holds Belgian and Colombian citizenship. She moved to La Hulpe near Brussels and took up golf at the age of 8. A member of the Belgium National Team, she represented Belgium at the Espirito Santo Trophy in 2008 and 2010. Representing Europe she won the 2006 Junior Ryder Cup at Celtic Manor Resort, and the 2009 Vagliano Trophy in Hamburg.

Gonzalez won the 2008 Girls Amateur Championship, reached the quarterfinals of the 2012 U.S. Women's Amateur, eliminated by eventual champion and world's top-ranked amateur, Lydia Ko. She was runner-up at the 2013 European Ladies Amateur Championship in Finland, three strokes behind Emily Kristine Pedersen.

== Collegiate career ==
Gonzalez attended Purdue University from 2009 to 2013, and graduated with a Bachelor of Science in mathematics. She played for the Purdue Boilermakers women's golf team where she helped win the NCAA Division I women's golf championship in 2010, and to a runner-up finish in 2011, and a 3rd-place finish in 2013. She placed 3rd individually in both 2011 and 2012.

Gonzalez won four tournaments and was named 2010 Big Ten Freshman of the Year, 2012 Big Ten Golfer of the Year, and received the 2012 Mary Fossum Award for the conference's lowest stroke average.

In 2024, she was inducted into the Purdue Athletics Hall of Fame.

== Professional career ==
Gonzalez joined the Symetra Tour in 2014 and finished 23rd on the money list, falling to 35th in 2015. In 2016, she picked up her first two professional wins, first at the FireKeepers Casino Hotel Championship in July, then at the PHC Classic in August. She finished fifth on the Symetra Tour money list to earn LPGA Tour membership for the 2017 season.

Her win at the FireKeepers Casino Hotel Championship also qualified Gonzalez for her first major, the 2016 Evian Championship, where she made the cut and finished tied 55th.

As a rookie in on the 2017 LPGA Tour, she made 17 cuts in 25 starts, with two top-10 finishes including a career-best tie for 5th at the Manulife LPGA Classic. She held the overnight lead at the Thornberry Creek LPGA Classic after an opening round of 65. She finished sixth in the Rookie of the Year standings and 73rd on the money list.

In 2018, she missed most of the LPGA season due to injury and only played two events. Upon return from injury, she made only two cuts in 19 starts on the 2019 LPGA Tour.

== Amateur wins ==
- 2008 Girls Amateur Championship, Belgian Girls' Championship
- 2009 German International Amateur Championship
- 2009 Doral Junior Championship
- 2010 Big Ten Championship
- 2012 Battle At Rancho Bernardo
- 2012 Big Ten Championship
- 2013 Belgian International Amateur Championship

== Professional wins (2) ==
=== Symetra Tour (2) ===
No.	Date	Tournament	Winning score	Margin of victory	Runner-up
1	24 Jul 2016	FireKeepers Casino Hotel Championship	−15 (65-64=129)	6 strokes	(United States) Ally McDonald
2	21 Aug 2016	PHC Classic	−10 (68-70-68=206)	1 stroke	(United States) Erynne Lee

== Results in LPGA majors ==
Tournament	2016	2017	2018	2019
ANA Inspiration		T60		CUT
U.S. Women's Open		CUT		
Women's PGA Championship		T70		CUT
The Evian Championship	T55	CUT		
Women's British Open		T63		

Did not play

CUT = missed the half-way cut
"T" = tied

== Team appearances ==
Amateur

- European Girls' Team Championship (representing Belgium): 2004, 2006
- Junior Ryder Cup (representing Europe): 2006 (winners)
- European Ladies' Team Championship (representing Belgium): 2007, 2008, 2009, 2010, 2011, 2013
- Vagliano Trophy (representing the Continent of Europe): 2009 (winners)
- Espirito Santo Trophy (representing Belgium): 2008, 2010
