= Amy Boulden =

Welsh golfer (born 1993)

Personal information
- Nationality: Wales
- Born: 6 August 1993 (age 33) St Asaph, Wales

Career
- Sport: Golf
- Turned professional: 2013
- Current tour: Ladies European Tour (joined 2014)
- Former tour: Symetra Tour
- Professional wins: 2

Number of wins by tour
- Ladies European Tour: 1

Best results in LPGA major championships
- Chevron Championship: DNP
- Women's PGA C'ship: DNP
- U.S. Women's Open: MC: 2014
- Women's British Open: T9: 2015
- Evian Championship: DNP

Achievements and awards
- Ladies European Tour Rookie of the Year: 2014
- BBC Wales Young Sportswoman of the Year: 2008

Amy Boulden (born 6 August 1993) is a Welsh professional golfer who plays on the Ladies European Tour.

== Amateur career ==
Boulden represented Wales and had one of the most successful amateur careers in Welsh golfing history, including part in winning a record three Home Internationals (2008, 2009 and 2013). She represented Europe in Junior Ryder Cup and Junior Solheim Cup, and represented Great Britain & Ireland in the 2011 Astor Trophy, the 2012 Curtis Cup, plus 2011 and 2013 Vagliano Trophy.

Individually, Boulden was Welsh Girls Champion (2008), Welsh Ladies' Amateur Champion (2012), Scottish Open Amateur Champion (2012), Welsh Open Amateur Stroke Play Champion (2013) and English Open Amateur Stroke Play Champion (2013), and was runner up at the 2010 Ladies' British Open Amateur Stroke Play Championship. She was named BBC Wales Young Sportswoman of the Year 2008. She qualified for three Women's British Opens (Royal Birkdale 2010, Royal Liverpool 2012 and St Andrews 2013) where she did not make the cut.

== Professional career ==
Boulden went on to become LET Rookie of the Year in 2014 after she made 12 cuts in 16 tournaments and finished runner-up at Lacoste Ladies Open de France, third at the Sberbank Golf Masters and tied for fourth in the Ladies German Open. She captured her first professional win at the Association Suisse de Golf Ladies Open on the LET Access Series following a six-hole playoff in May 2014.

In 2015 she rose to 101st on the Women's World Golf Rankings and finished 10th on the LET Order of Merit after she tied for ninth in the 2015 Women's British Open. Between 2015 and 2018 she recorded further top-5 finishes at the Buick Championship (2015), Lacoste Ladies Open de France (2016) and Ladies European Thailand Championship (2017).

She played 17 events on the 2019 Symetra Tour where she made 14 cuts and recorded a season-best T5 at the Zimmer Bioment Championship. After the season on the Symetra Tour, Boulden regained her place on the 2020 Ladies European Tour with victory at Qualifying School at La Manga Club in Spain in January 2020. She birdied the 18th hole to finish on 10-under and win final stage qualifying. In September 2020, Boulden won for the first time on the Ladies European Tour with a three stroke victory at the VP Bank Swiss Ladies Open.

== Professional wins (2) ==
=== Ladies European Tour wins (1) ===
No.	Date	Tournament	Winning score	To par	Margin of victory	Runner-up
1	12 Sep 2020	VP Bank Swiss Ladies Open	70-65-64=199	−17	3 strokes	(Australia) Stephanie Kyriacou

=== LET Access Series wins (1) ===
No.	Date	Tournament	Winning score	To par	Margin of victory	Runners-up
1	4 May 2014	Association Suisse de Golf Ladies Open	69-69-71=209	−7	Playoff	(England) Kelly Tidy, (Scotland) Sally Watson

== Team appearances ==
Amateur

- European Ladies' Team Championship (representing Wales): 2009, 2010, 2011, 2013
- Junior Ryder Cup (representing Europe): 2010
- Espirito Santo Trophy (representing Wales): 2010, 2012
- Junior Solheim Cup (representing Europe): 2011
- Vagliano Trophy (representing Great Britain & Ireland): 2011, 2013
- Astor Trophy (representing Great Britain & Ireland): 2011 (winners)
- Curtis Cup (representing Great Britain & Ireland): 2012 (winners)
