= Noora Komulainen =

Finnish professional golfer

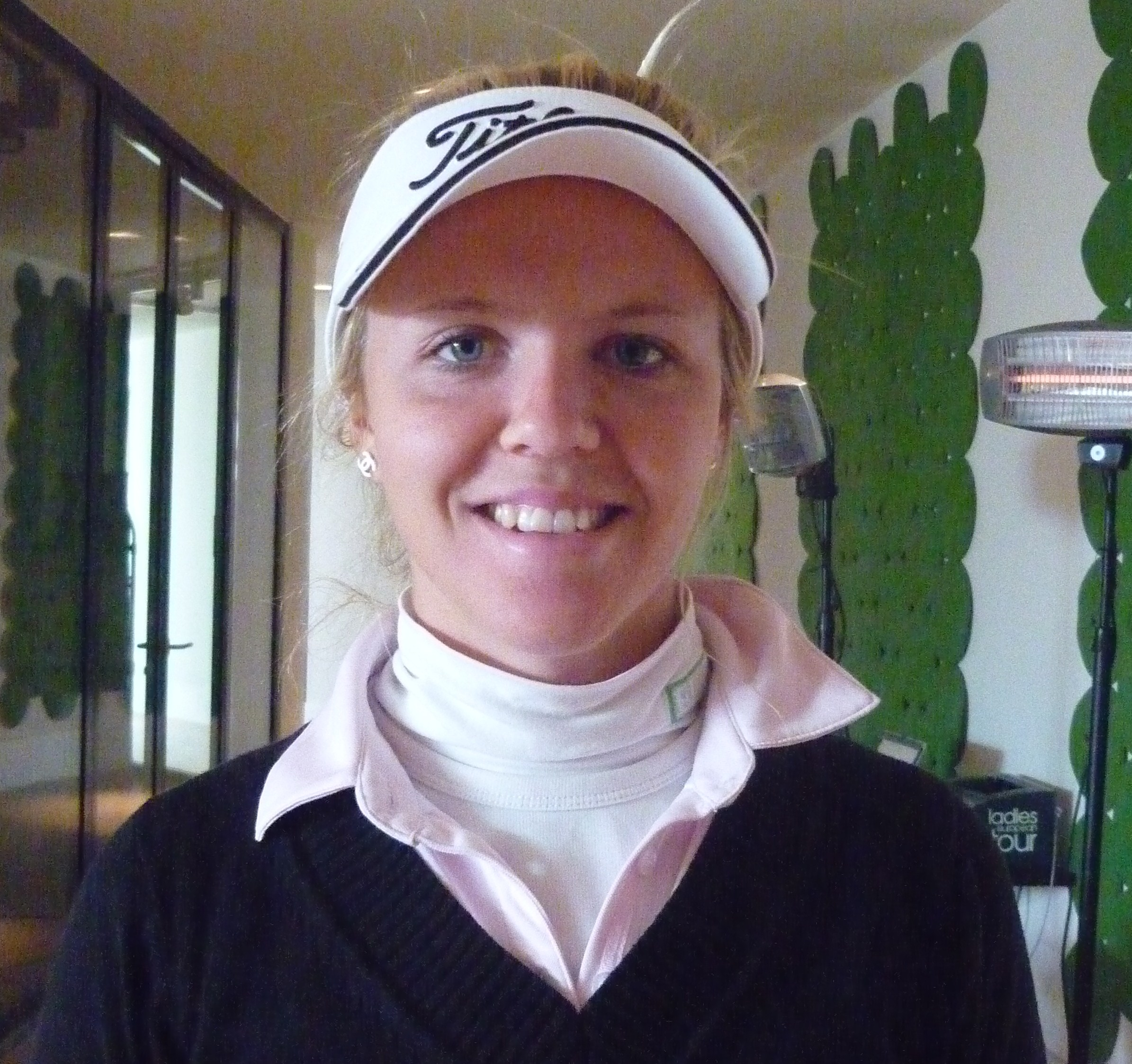

Personal information
- Nationality: Finland
- Born: 30 October 1990 (age 36) Tampere, Finland
- Height: 1.69 m (5 ft 7 in)

Career
- Sport: Golf
- Turned professional: 2013
- Current tour: Ladies European Tour (joined 2013)
- Professional wins: 1

Number of wins by tour
- Ladies European Tour: 1

Best results in LPGA major championships
- Chevron Championship: DNP
- Women's PGA C'ship: DNP
- U.S. Women's Open: DNP
- Women's British Open: CUT: 2016, 2017, 2019, 2024, 2026
- Evian Championship: DNP

Noora Komulainen (née Tamminen) (born 30 October 1990) is a Finnish professional golfer and Ladies European Tour player. She represented Finland at the 2016 and 2024 Olympics, and won the 2026 Czech Ladies Open. In 2022, she won the Aramco Team Series – Sotogrande team event together with Tereza Melecká and Jessica Korda.

== Career ==
Komulainen was a member of the Finland National Team as an amateur. At the 2012 Espirito Santo Trophy she won a bronze medal together with Krista Bakker and Sanna Nuutinen.

In 2013, she turned professional and joined the Ladies European Tour. She recorded ten top-10 finishes 2013–2019, including a fourth place at the 2016 Lalla Meryem Cup, after which she rose to the top 250 in the Women's World Golf Rankings.

Komulainen represented Finland at the 2016 Summer Olympics where she finished tied for 48th, and again in 2024, where she had to withdraw.

In 2022, she won the Aramco Team Series – Sotogrande team event in Spain together with Jessica Korda, LET rookie Tereza Melecká, and polo player Malcolm Borwick, one stroke ahead of a team led by Pauline Roussin-Bouchard.

In 2026, Komulainen ended a 14-year wait for her maiden LET victory, prevailing in a three-way play-off at the Czech Ladies Open, after birdying the final four holes in regular play.

== Amateur wins ==
- 2011 Mandatum Life Final
- 2012 Paltamo Ladies Open, Finnish Stroke Play

== Professional wins (1) ==
=== Ladies European Tour wins (1) ===
No.	Date	Tournament	Winning score	To par	Margin of victory	Runners-up
1	28 Jun 2026	Tipsport Czech Ladies Open	65-67-66=198	−18	Playoff	(Australia) Justice Bosio (Sweden) Lisa Pettersson

Ladies European Tour playoff record (1–0)

No.	Year	Tournament	Opponents	Result
1	2026	Tipsport Czech Ladies Open	(Australia) Justice Bosio (Sweden) Lisa Pettersson	Won with birdie on first extra hole

== Team appearances ==
Amateur

- European Ladies' Team Championship (representing Finland): 2009, 2010, 2011
- Espirito Santo Trophy (representing Finland): 2010, 2012
