= Caroline Afonso =

French professional golfer

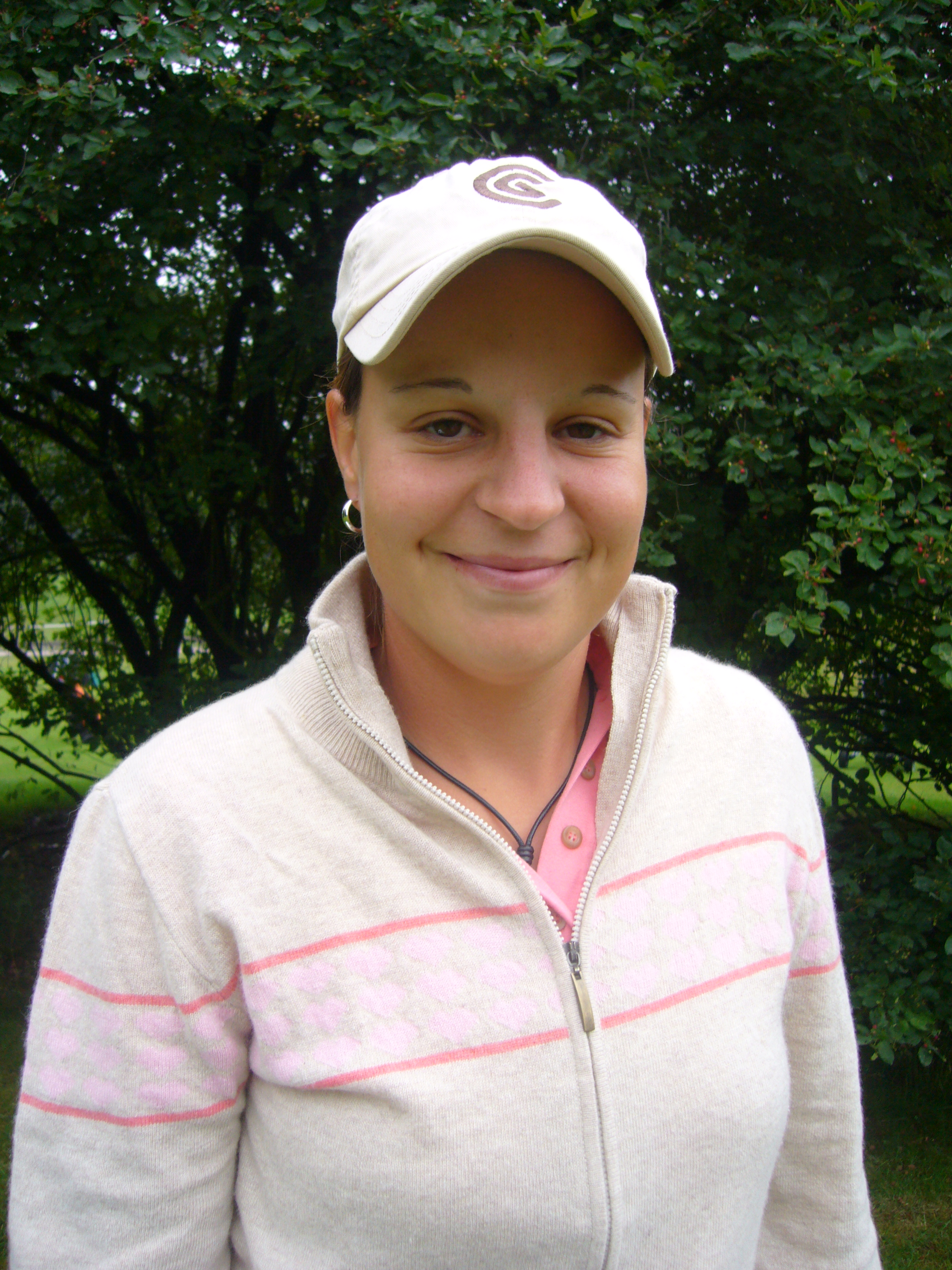

Personal information
- Nationality: France
- Born: 20 February 1985 (age 41) Quimper, France
- Height: 1.73 m (5 ft 8 in)

Career
- Sport: Golf
- Turned professional: 2007
- Former tour: Ladies European Tour (2008–2016)
- Professional wins: 3

Best results in LPGA major championships
- Chevron Championship: DNP
- Women's PGA C'ship: DNP
- U.S. Women's Open: DNP
- Women's British Open: CUT: 2010, 2011
- Evian Championship: CUT: 2014

Achievements and awards
- LET Access Series Order of Merit: 2010

Caroline Afonso (born 20 February 1985) is a retired French professional golfer who played on the Ladies European Tour (LET) 2008–2016. She was runner-up twice on the LET and won three LET Access Series events. She is of Portuguese descent.

== Career ==
Afonso started playing golf at 10 and was coached by Philippe Mendiburu, father of LET player Sandrine Mendiburu. She won the French Ladies Amateur Championship twice and was ranked best amateur in France 2007. Afonso turned professional at the end of 2007 and joined the Ladies European Tour on her first attempt in 2008, where she in her rookie year recorded top-10 finishes at Ladies Scottish Open and Austrian Ladies Open, and ended the season 44th in the Order of Merit. She recorded further top-10 finishes at the Finnair Masters in 2009 and Ladies German Open, Tenerife Ladies Open and Open de France Feminin in 2010.

In March 2010 Afonso earned the distinction of winning the inaugural tournament of the LET Access Series, the Terre Blanche Ladies Open, securing her first professional win. She won again in July at the La Nivelle Ladies Open, and won the 2010 LET Access Series Order of Merit ahead of Jade Schaeffer.

On the 2011 Ladies European Tour Afonso had her most successful season, finishing third at the Ladies Scottish Open, runner-up one stroke behind Melissa Reid at the Dutch Ladies Open, and sole runner-up behind Caroline Hedwall at the Austrian Ladies Open, to end 27th in the Order of Merit. In 2012 she brought her LETAS tally on home soil to three by winning the Fourqueux Ladies Open.

Afonso played in the Women's British Open in 2010 and 2011, and received a wild card to the 2014 Evian Championship, but never made the cut in a major championship.

At the end of 2016 Afonso announced that she was retiring from tour.

== Amateur wins ==
- 1999 French Ladies Amateur Championship
- 2007 French Ladies Amateur Championship

== Professional wins (3) ==
=== LET Access Series wins (3) ===
No.	Date	Tournament	Winning score	To par	Margin of victory	Runner(s)-up
1	18 Mar 2010	Terre Blanche Ladies Open	221	+5		
2	11 Jun 2010	La Nivelle Ladies Open	208	−2		
3	15 Sep 2012	Fourqueux Ladies Open	71-71-70=212	−4	5 strokes	(Scotland) Katy McNicoll

== Team appearances ==
Amateur

- European Ladies' Team Championship (representing France): 2007
