= Giulia Molinaro =

Italian professional golfer

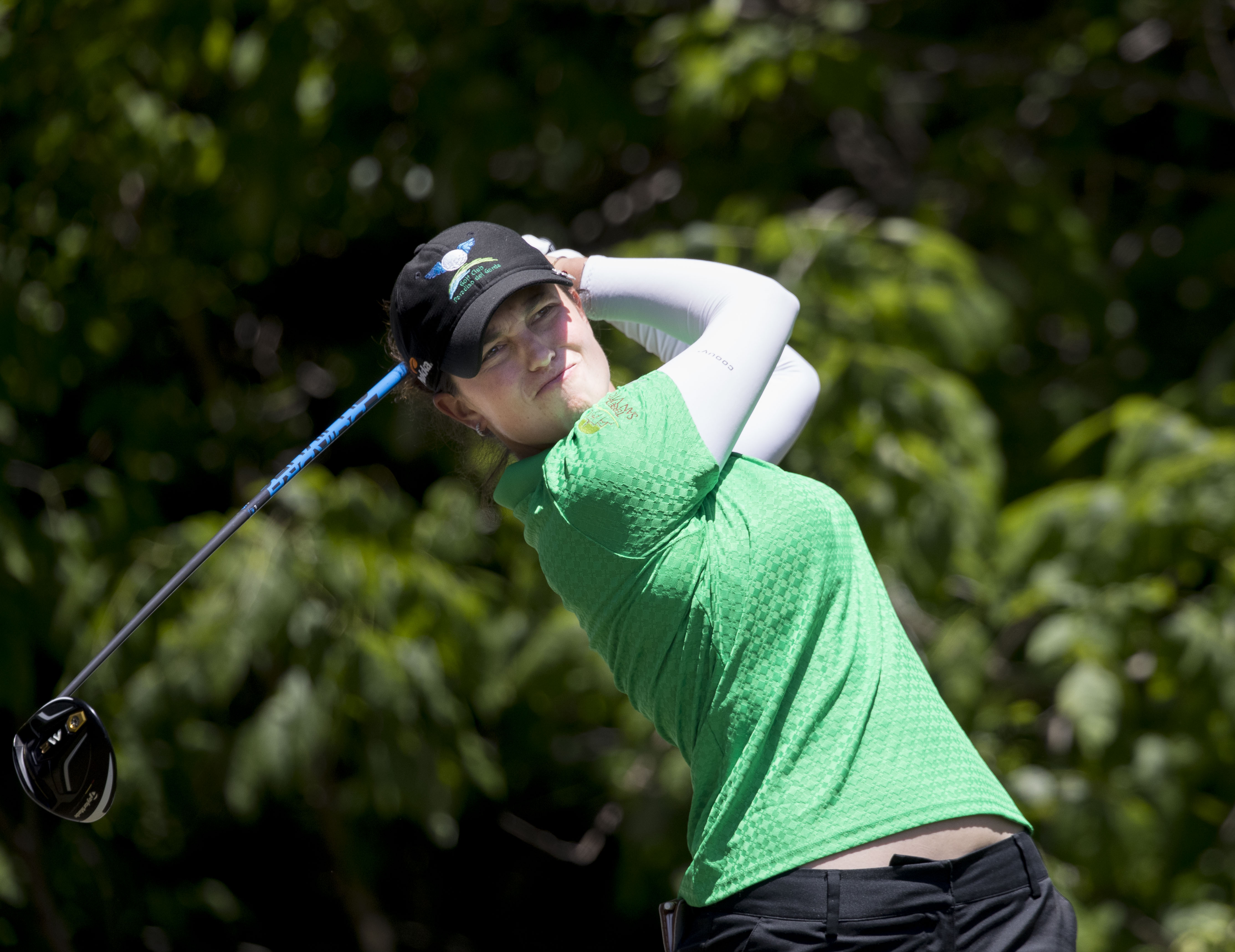

Personal information
- Nationality: Italy
- Born: 23 July 1990 (age 36) Camposampiero, Italy
- Height: 5 ft 10 in (178 cm)

Career
- Sport: Golf
- College: Arizona State University
- Turned professional: 2012
- Current tour: LPGA Tour (joined 2014)
- Former tour: Symetra Tour (joined 2013)
- Professional wins: 1

Number of wins by tour
- Epson Tour: 1

Best results in LPGA major championships
- Chevron Championship: T44: 2022
- Women's PGA C'ship: T3: 2021
- U.S. Women's Open: 61st: 2021
- Women's British Open: CUT: 2021
- Evian Championship: CUT: 2021

Achievements and awards
- Symetra Tour Rookie of the Year: 2013
- Pac-12 Player of the Year: 2012
Medal record
Mediterranean Games
| Bronze medal – third place | 2009 Pescara | Women's team |

Giulia Molinaro (born 23 July 1990) is an Italian professional golfer and LPGA Tour player. She tied for third at the 2021 Women's PGA Championship and represented Italy at the 2016 Summer Olympics and the 2020 Summer Olympics.

== Early life and amateur career ==
Molinaro was born in Camposampiero in Veneto, Northern Italy, but lived in Kenya for the majority of her childhood, due to her father's career in hotel management. She started playing golf at the age of 12.

She was member of the Italian National team and represented Italy at the Espirito Santo Trophy and the European Ladies' Team Championship, and played on the European team at the 2006 Junior Ryder Cup. Individually, she was leading girl at the 2007 Duke of York Young Champions Trophy and finished sixth at the 2008 European Ladies Amateur.

Molinaro played college golf at Arizona State University between 2008 and 2012, where she was named Pac-12 Conference Player of the Year in her final season.

== Professional career ==
Molinaro turned professional in October 2012 and joined the Symetra Tour. In 2013, she recorded one victory at the Friends of Mission Charity Classic and four additional top-10 finishes, earning Rookie of the Year honors. She finishing second on the money list, earning her an LPGA Tour card for 2014. After making only 8 cuts in 18 events and finishing 114th on the money list in 2014, she was back on the Symetra Tour in 2015. She again finished second on the money list and returned to the LPGA Tour in 2016.

She tied for third at the 2021 Women's PGA Championship after which she broke into the top-100 on the Women's World Golf Rankings for the first time.

== Amateur wins ==
- 2007 Girls Junior Orange Bowl
- 2011 Dale McNamara Invitational
- 2012 Swiss International Amateur

== Professional wins (1) ==
=== Symetra Tour wins (1) ===
| No. | Date | Tournament | Winning score | Margin of victory | Runner-up |
|---|---|---|---|---|---|
| 1 | May 19, 2013 | Friends of Mission Charity Classic | −13 (68-70-65=203) | 5 strokes | (Chile) Macarena Silva |

== Results in LPGA majors ==
Results not in chronological order.

| Tournament | 2016 | 2017 | 2018 | 2019 | 2020 | 2021 | 2022 |
|---|---|---|---|---|---|---|---|
| Chevron Championship | | | | | | | T44 |
| U.S. Women's Open | | | CUT | | | 61 | |
| Women's PGA Championship | CUT | CUT | CUT | CUT | | T3 | CUT |
| The Evian Championship | | | | | NT | CUT | |
| Women's British Open | | | | | | CUT | |

Top 10
Did not play

CUT = missed the half-way cut
NT = No tournament
"T" = tied

== Team appearances ==
- Junior Ryder Cup (representing Europe): 2006 (tie, Cup retained)
- Espirito Santo Trophy (representing Italy): 2008, 2010, 2012
- European Ladies' Team Championship (representing Italy): 2009, 2010, 2011
