= GolfStream Ladies Open =

Tournament information
- Location: Kiev, Ukraine
- Established: 2012
- Course: Kiev Golf Club
- Par: 72
- Length: 6,172 yards (5,644 m)
- Tour: LET Access Series
- Format: Stroke play
- Prize fund: €20,000
- Month played: May
- Final year: 2012

Tournament record score
- Aggregate: 215 Anastasia Kostina (2012)
- To par: −1 as above

Final champion
- (Russia) Anastasia Kostina

Location map
- Location in Ukraine

The GolfStream Ladies Open was a golf tournament on the LET Access Series. It was played for the first and only time in May 2012 at the Kiev Golf Club in Kyiv, Ukraine.

== History ==
The tournament was the first ever professional women's golf tournament held in Ukraine.

It was won by Russia's Anastasia Kostina, who prevailed in tough conditions including strong wind of up to 30 kilometer per hour, despite starting the final round four shots behind the overnight leader, ultimate runner-up Bénédicte Toumpsin.

Kostina made history by becoming the first Russian winner on either the LET Access Series or the main Ladies European Tour.

== Winners ==
Year	Winner	Score	Margin of victory	Runner-up
2012	(Russia) Anastasia Kostina	−1 (75-70-70=215)	4 strokes	(Belgium) Bénédicte Toumpsin

== See also ==
- Kharkov Superior Cup
