= 2010 European Ladies' Team Championship =

Golf competition

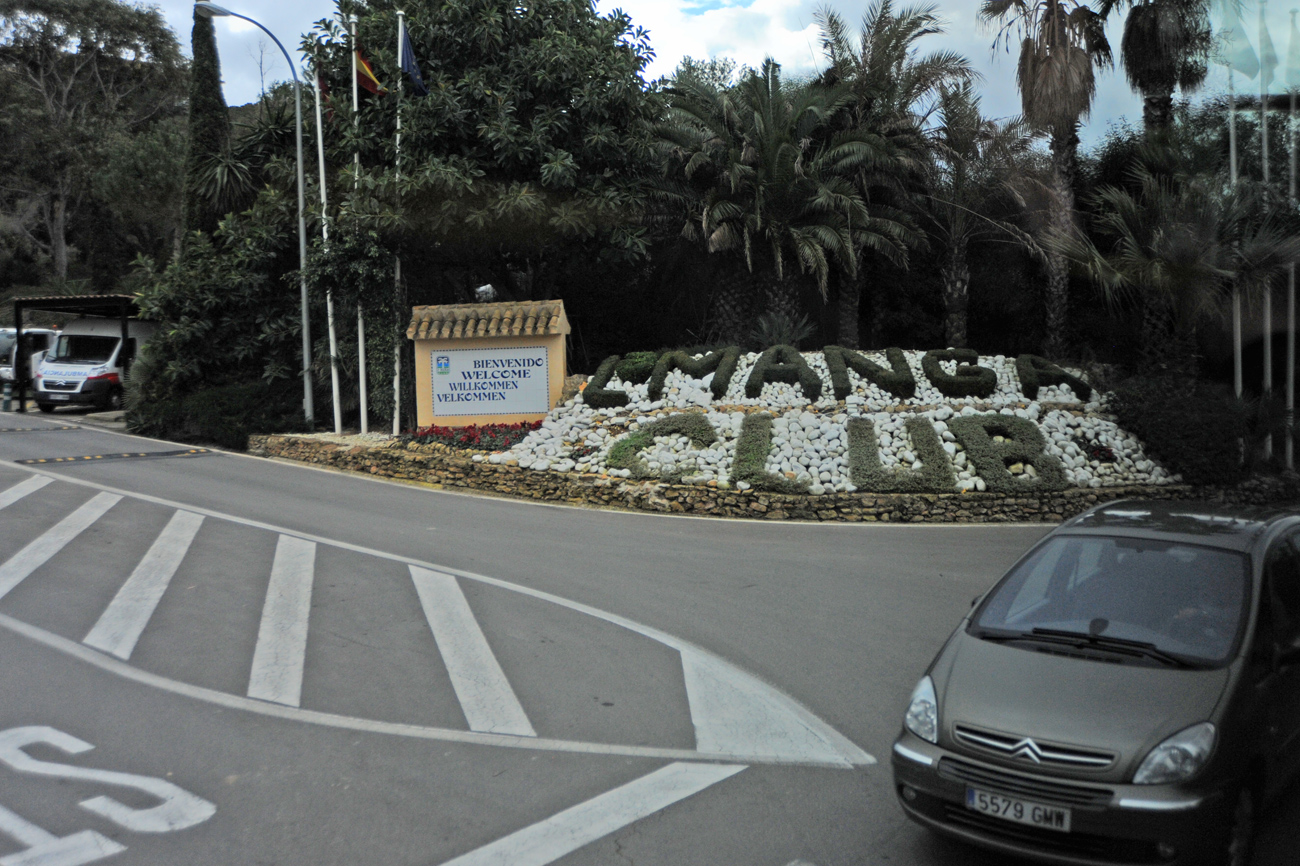
- La Manga Club

Tournament information
- Dates: 6–10 July 2010
- Location: Cartagena, Spain; 37.6018°N 0.8200°W
- Course: La Manga Club (South Course)
- Organized by: European Golf Association
- Format: 36 holes stroke play Knock-out match-play

Statistics
- Par: 73
- Field: 17 teams 102 players

Champion
- Sweden; Caroline Hedwall, Jacqueline Hedwall, Camilla Lennarth, Louise Larsson, Nathalie Månsson, Amanda Sträng
- Qualification round: 730 (E); Final match 4–3

Location map
- Location in Europe Location in Spain Location in Murcia

The 2010 European Ladies' Team Championship took place 6–10 July at La Manga Club in Cartagena, Spain. It was the 28th women's golf amateur European Ladies' Team Championship.

== Venue ==
The hosting La Manga Club, located with three golf courses in the south-eastern region of Spain, Murcia, south of La Manga, and bordered by the Mar Menor and Calblanque Regional Park, was opened in 1972. The South Course was designed by golf architect Robert Dean Putman in 1971 and remodeled in 2005 by Arnold Palmer.

The championship course was set up with par 73.

== Format ==
All participating teams played two qualification rounds of stroke-play with six players, counted the five best scores for each team.

The eight best teams formed flight A, in knock-out match-play over the next three days. The teams were seeded based on their positions after the stroke-play. The first placed team was drawn to play the quarter-final against the eight placed team, the second against the seventh, the third against the sixth and the fourth against the fifth. In each match between two nation teams, two 18-hole foursome games and five 18-hole single games were played. Teams were allowed to switch players during the team matches, selecting other players in to the afternoon single games after the morning foursome games. Teams knocked out after the quarter-finals played one foursome game and four single games in each of their remaining matches. Games all square after 18 holes were declared halved, if the team match was already decided.

The six teams placed 9–14 in the qualification stroke-play formed flight B, to play similar knock-out match-play, with one foursome game and four single games, to decide their final positions.

The three teams placed 15–17 in the qualification stroke-play formed flight C, to meet each other, with one foursome game and four single games, to decide their final positions.

== Teams ==
17 nation teams contested the event. Each team consisted of six players.

Players in the teams

Country	Players
Austria	Stefanie Endstrasser, Marina Kotnik, Nina Mühl, Christine Wolf, Claudia Wolf, Fanny Wolte
Belgium	Fanny Cnops, Laura Gonzalez Escallon, Laurence Herman, Chloé Leurquin, Manon De Roey, Bénédicte Thoumpsin
Denmark	Line Vedel Hansen, Charlotte Kring Lorentzen, Therese Kølbæk, Cathrine Orloff Madsen, Sara Monberg, Jinjira S. Rasmussen
England	Hanah Barwood, Hannah Burke, Holly Clyburn, Hayley Davis, Charlie Douglas, Rachel Jennings
Finland	Linda Henriksson, Elina Nummenpää, Sanna Nuutinen, Annika Nykänen, Noora Tamminen, Minna Vuorenpää
France	Lucie André, Valentine Derrey, Morgane Bazin de Jessey, Inés Lescudier, Marion Ricordeau, Audrey Riguelle
Germany	Pia Halbig, Thea Hoffmeister, Nina Holleder, Lara Katzy, Stephanie Kirchmaier, Valerie Sternebeck
Iceland	Signy Arnorsdottir, Tinna Johannsdottir, Valdís Þóra Jónsdóttir, Ólafía Þórunn Kristinsdóttir, Ragna Olafsdottir, Nina Björk Geirsdottir
Ireland	Victoria Bradshaw, Mary Dowling, Danielle McVeigh, Gillian O'Leary, Sinead O'Sullivan, Charlene Reid
Italy	Alessandra Averna, Alessandra Braida, Annagiulia Martinis, Giulia Molinaro, Anna Roscio, Valeria Tandrin
Netherlands	Myrte Eikenaar, Caroline Karsten, Kyra Van Leeuwen, Marieke Nivard, Charlotte Puts, Chrisje de Vries, Karlijn Zaanen
Norway	Tonje Daffinrud, Marita Engzelius, Lene Hafsten-Morch, Solveig Helgesen, Rachel Raastad, Stina Resen
Scotland	Megan Briggs, Louise Kenney, Kelsey MacDonald, Laura Murray, Pamela Pretswell, Jane Turner
Spain	Carlota Ciganda, Elia Folch, Mireia Prat, Marta Silva, Ane Urchegui, Adriana Zwanck
Sweden	Caroline Hedwall, Jacqueline Hedwall, Camilla Lennarth, Louise Larsson, Nathalie Månsson, Amanda Sträng
Switzerland	Sheila Got-Lee, Anais Maggetti, Melanie Mätzler, Sherlyn Popelka, Fabia Rothenfluh, Fanny Vuignier
Wales	Amy Boulden, Sam Birks, Gemma Bradbury, Tara Davies, Becky Harries, Kath O'Connor

== Winners ==
Team Sweden lead the opening 36-hole qualifying competition, with a score of even par 730, one stroke ahead of host nation Spain.

Individual leaders in the 36-hole stroke-play competition was Camilla Lennarth, Sweden and Mireia Prat, Spain, each with a score of 6 under par 140, one stroke ahead of Carlota Ciganda, Spain and Caroline Hedwall, Sweden.

Team Sweden won the championship, beating Spain 4–3 in the final and earned their sixth title.

Team Scotland earned third place, beating defending champions Germany 4 1/2–2 1/2 in the bronze match.

== Results ==
Qualification round

Team standings

Place	Country	Score	To par
1	Sweden	361-369=730	E
2	Spain	368-363=731	+1
3	England	364-377=741	+11
4	Denmark	369-381=750	+20
5	Germany	381-375=756	+26
6	Scotland	379-378=757	+27
7	Netherlands	381-378=759	+29
T8	France *	377-383=760	+30
T8	Austria	383-377=760	+30
10	Switzerland	376-385=761	+31
11	Norway	379-385=764	+34
12	Belgium	381-388=769	+39
T13	Wales *	391=381=772	+42
T13	Ireland	387-385=772	+42
T15	Finland *	386-389=775	+45
T15	Italy	387-388=775	+45
17	Iceland	402-401=803	+73

* Note: In the event of a tie the order was determined by the better total non-counting scores.

Individual leaders

Place	Player	Country	Score	To par
T1	Camilla Lennarth	Sweden	71-69=140	−6
T1	Mireia Prat	Spain	71-69 =140	−6
T3	Carlota Ciganda	Spain	70-71=141	−5
T3	Caroline Hedwall	Sweden	74-67=141	−5
5	Therese Kølbæk	Denmark	71-72=143	−3
6	Stephanie Kirchmaier	Germany	75-69=144	−2
T7	Rachel Jennings	England	72-73=145	−1
T7	Marta Silva	Spain	74-71=145	−1
T7	Fanny Vuigner	Switzerland	69-76=145	−1
T10	Nathalie Månsson	Sweden	73-73=146	E
T10	Bénédicte Thoumpsin	Belgium	73-73=146	E

Note: There was no official award for the lowest individual score.

Flight A

Bracket

Quarter finals
Sweden	4.5
France	2.5
Germany	5
Denmark	2
Scotland	4
England	3
Spain	4
Netherlands	3

Semi finals
Sweden	5.5
Germany	1.5
Spain	4.5
Scotland	2.5

Final
Sweden	4
Spain	3
Bronze match
Scotland	4.5
Germany	2.5

Elimination matches
France	3
Denmark	2
England	3.5
Netherlands	1.5

Match for 5th place
France	4.5
England	0.5
Match for 7th place
Denmark	4
Netherlands	1

Final games

Sweden	Spain
4	3
Sträng / Månsson	Ciganda / Silva 7 & 5
Lennarth / C. Hedwall 6 & 4	Folch / Prat
Jacqueline Hedwall	Carlota Ciganda 4 & 3
Caroline Hedwall	Marta Silva 19th hole
Camilla Lennarth 19th hole	Mireia Prat
Louise Larsson 5 & 3	Elia Folch
Nathalie Månsson 19th hole	Ane Urchegui

Flight B

Bracket

Round 1
Wales	3.5
Belgium	1.5
Norway	3
Ireland	2

Round 2
Wales	4
Austria	1
Switzerland	3
Norway	2

Match for 9th place
Wales	3
Switzerland	2
Match for 11th place
Norway	4
Austria	1

Round 1

Match for 13th place
Belgium	4.5
Ireland	1.5

Flight C

Team matches

Round 1
Italy	3
Iceland	2

Round 2
Iceland	3
Finland	2
Round 3
Finland	3
Italy	2

Team standings

Country	Place	W	T	L	Game points	Match points!	Won holes
Finland	15	1	0	1	5–5	1	22
Italy	16	1	0	1	5–5	1	19
Iceland	17	1	0	1	5–5	1	14

Final standings

Place	Country
1st place, gold medalist(s)	Sweden
2nd place, silver medalist(s)	Spain
3rd place, bronze medalist(s)	Scotland
4	Germany
5	France
6	England
7	Denmark
8	Netherlands
9	Wales
10	Switzerland
11	Norway
12	Austria
13	Belgium
14	Ireland
15	Finland
16	Italy
17	Iceland

== See also ==
- Espirito Santo Trophy – biennial world amateur team golf championship for women organized by the International Golf Federation.
- European Amateur Team Championship – European amateur team golf championship for men organised by the European Golf Association.
- European Ladies Amateur Championship – European amateur individual golf championship for women organised by the European Golf Association.
