= 2009 European Ladies' Team Championship =

Golf competition

Tournament information
- Dates: 7–11 July 2009
- Location: Bled, Slovenia; 46°22′17.80″N 14°8′17.00″E
- Course: Bled Golf & Country Club (King's Course)
- Organized by: European Golf Association
- Format: 36 holes stroke play Knock-out match-play

Statistics
- Par: 73
- Field: 18 teams 108 players

Champion
- Germany; Pia Halbig, Thea Hoffmeister, Lara Katzy, Staphanie Kirchmaier, Caroline Masson, Nicola Rössler
- Qualification round: 752 (+22); Final match 4–3

Location map
- Location in Europe Location in Slovenia

The 2009 European Ladies' Team Championship took place 7–11 July at Bled Golf & Country Club in Bled, Slovenia. It was the 27th women's golf amateur European Ladies' Team Championship.

== Venue ==
The hosting King's Course at Bled Golf & Country Club, the oldest golf course in Slovenia, located 2 kilometers east of Bled, was built in 1937 in varied and diverse terrains, on the initiative of the Yugoslav royal family. It was re-designed in 1972 by golf architect Donald Harradine.

The championship course was set up with par 73.

== Format ==
All participating teams played two qualification rounds of stroke-play with six players, counted the five best scores for each team.

The eight best teams formed flight A, in knock-out match-play over the next three days. The teams were seeded based on their positions after the stroke-play. The first placed team was drawn to play the quarter final against the eight placed team, the second against the seventh, the third against the sixth and the fourth against the fifth. In each match between two nation teams, two 18-hole foursome games and five 18-hole single games were played. Teams were allowed to switch players during the team matches, selecting other players in to the afternoon single games after the morning foursome games. Teams knocked out after the quarter finals played one foursome game and four single games in each of their remaining matches. Games all square after 18 holes were declared halved, if the team match was already decided.

The seven teams placed 9–15 in the qualification stroke-play formed flight B, to play similar knock-out match-play, with one foursome game and four single games, to decide their final positions.

The three teams placed 16–18 in the qualification stroke-play formed flight C, to meet each other, with one foursome game and four single games, to decide their final positions.

== Teams ==
18 nation teams contested the event. Each team consisted of six players.

Players in the teams

| Country | Players |
|---|---|
| Austria | Stefanie Endstrasser, Marina Kotnik, Marlies Krenn, Nina Mühl, Carolin Pinegger, Christine Wolf |
| Belgium | Joelle van Baarle, Valentine Gevers, Laura Gonzalez Escallon, Laurence Herman, Chloé Leurquin, Sara van Zonhoven |
| Denmark | Nicole Broch Larsen, Charlotte Kring Lorentzen, Therese Kølbæk, Daisy Nielsen, Maja Stage Nielsen, Cathrine Orloff Madsen |
| England | Hanah Barwood, Emma Brown, Holly Clyburn, Charlie Douglas, Jodi Ewart, Rachel Jennings |
| Finland | Linda Henriksson, Peppina Kaija, Annika Korkeila, Elina Nummenpää, Noora Tamminen, Maija UUsi Simola |
| France | Lucie André, Laura Chemarin, Valentine Derrey, Morgane Bazin de Jessey, Marion Ricordeau, Audrey Riguelle |
| Germany | Pia Halbig, Thea Hoffmeister, Lara Katzy, Stephanie Kirchmaier, Caroline Masson, Nicola Rössler |
| Iceland | Signy Arnorsdottir, Teena Johannsdottir, Valdís Þóra Jónsdóttir, Ólafía Þórunn Kristinsdóttir, Ragna Olafsdottir, Eyglo Oskarsdottir |
| Ireland | Sarah Cunningham, Mary Dowling, Niamh Kitching, Danielle McVeigh, Aedin Murphy, Charlene Reid |
| Italy | Alessandra Averna, Alessia Knight, Alessandra de Poli de Luigi, Giulia Molinaro, Camilla Patussi, Anna Roscio |
| Netherlands | Myrte Eikenaar, Caroline Karsten, Kyra Van Leeuwen, Maaike Naafs, Marieke Nivard, Chrisje de Vries, Karlijn Zaanen |
| Norway | Marita Engzelius, Cesilie Hagen, Elizabeth Haavardsholm, Karianne Hillas, Caroline Martens, Rachel Raastad |
| Scotland | Carly Booth, Louise Kenney, Kelsey MacDonald, Pamela Pretswell, Kylie Walker, Sally Watson |
| Slovenia | Zala Pia Jenko, Teja Kikeli, Anja Kirn, Urša Orehek, Katja Pogačar, Tajda Sarkanj |
| Spain | Carlota Ciganda, Ines Diaz Negrete, Mireia Prat, Marta Silva, Ane Urchegui, Adriana Zwanck |
| Sweden | Malin Einarsson, Caroline Hedwall, Jacqueline Hedwall, Camilla Lennarth, Nathalie Månsson, Amanda Sträng |
| Switzerland | Nadine Grüter, Melanie Mätzler, Rebecca Hüber, Lorraine Mulliez, Fabia Rothenfluh, Fanny Vuignier |
| Wales | Amy Boulden, Gemma Bradbury, Tara Davies, Stephanie Evans, Lucy Gold, Rhian Wyn Thomas |

== Winners ==
Team France lead the opening 36-hole qualifying competition, with a score of 3 over par 733, two strokes ahead of defending champions team Sweden.

Individual leaders in the 36-hole stroke-play competition was Carlota Ciganda, Spain and Marieke Nivard, Netherlands, each with a score of 7 under par 139, one stroke ahead of Lucie André, France..

Team Germany won the championship, beating England 4–3 in the final and earned their first title.

Team France earned third place, beating Spain 4–3 in the bronze match.

== Results ==
Qualification round

Team standings

| Place | Country | Score | To par |
|---|---|---|---|
| 1 | France | 369-364=733 | +3 |
| 2 | Sweden | 377-358=735 | +5 |
| 3 | Spain | 371-369=740 | +10 |
| T4 | England * | 371-373=744 | +14 |
| T4 | Netherlands | 373-371=744 | +14 |
| 6 | Denmark | 373-377=750 | +20 |
| 7 | Germany | 386-366=752 | +22 |
| 8 | Norway | 377-378=755 | +25 |
| T9 | Scotland * | 389-369=758 | +28 |
| T9 | Italy | 388-370=758 | +28 |
| T11 | Belgium * | 378-383=761 | +31 |
| T11 | Finland | 381-380=761 | +31 |
| 13 | Switzerland | 391-381=772 | +42 |
| T14 | Austria * | 396-378=774 | +44 |
| T14 | Wales | 381-393=774 | +44 |
| T16 | Ireland * | 387-389=776 | +46 |
| T16 | Iceland | 379-397=776 | +46 |
| 18 | Slovenia | 385-394=779 | +49 |

* Note: In the event of a tie the order was determined by the better total non-counting scores.

Individual leaders

| Place | Player | Country | Score | To par |
|---|---|---|---|---|
| T1 | Carlota Ciganda | Spain | 69-70=139 | −7 |
| T1 | Marieke Nivard | Netherlands | 68-71=139 | −7 |
| 3 | Lucie André | France | 69-71=140 | −6 |
| 4 | Marion Ricordeau | France | 71-71=142 | −4 |
| 5 | Marta Silva | Spain | 71-72=142 | −3 |
| T6 | Laura Gonzalez Escallon | Belgium | 71-73=144 | −2 |
| T6 | Giulia Molinaro | Italy | 74-70=144 | −2 |
| T6 | Urša Orehek | Slovenia | 70-74=144 | −2 |
| T9 | Rachel Jennings | England | 72-73=145 | −1 |
| T9 | Camilla Lennarth | Sweden | 73-72=145 | −1 |

Note: There was no official award for the lowest individual score.

Flight A

Bracket

Quarter finals
Germany | 4
Sweden | 3
Spain | 5
Denmark | 2
England | 4
Netherlands | 3
France | 4.5
Norway | 2.5

Semi finals
Germany | 4
Spain | 3
England | 4
France | 3

Final
Germany | 4
England | 3
Bronze match
France | 4
Spain | 3

Elimination matches
Sweden | 3
Denmark | 2
Netherlands | 4
Norway | 1

Match for 5th place
Sweden | 3
Netherlands | 2
Match for 7th place
Denmark | 3.5
Norway | 1.5

Final games

| Germany | England |
| 4 | 3 |
| L. Katzy / S. Kirchmayr 1 hole | H. Clyburn / C. Douglas |
| P. Halbig / C. Masson | E. Brown / J. Ewart 4 & 3 |
| Thea Hoffmeister | Charlie Douglas 19th hole |
| Stephanie Kirchmayr | Jodi Ewart 1 hole |
| Pia Halbig 19th hole | Emma Brown |
| Caroline Masson 3 & 2 | Rachel Jennings |
| Lara Katzy 3 & 2 | Hannah Barwood |

Flight B

Bracket

Round 1
Wales | 3
Italy | 2
Austria | 4
Belgium | 1
Switzerland | 3.5
Finland | 1.5

Round 2
Wales | 4
Austria | 1
Scotland | 4.5
Switzerland | 0.5

Match for 9th place
Scotland | 5
Wales | 0
Match for 11th place
Austria | 3
Switzerland | 2

Elimination match
Italy | 3
Belgium | 2

Match for 13th place
Italy | 4
Finland | 1

Flight C

Team matches

| 1 | Iceland | Slovenia | 0 |
| 4 | | 1 | |

| 1 | Ireland | Slovenia | 0 |
| 4 | | 1 | |

| 1 | Iceland | Ireland | 0 |
| 2 | | 2 | |

Final standings

| Place | Country |
|---|---|
| 1st place, gold medalist(s) | Germany |
| 2nd place, silver medalist(s) | England |
| 3rd place, bronze medalist(s) | France |
| 4 | Spain |
| 5 | Sweden |
| 6 | Netherlands |
| 7 | Denmark |
| 8 | Norway |
| 9 | Scotland |
| 10 | Wales |
| 11 | Austria |
| 12 | Switzerland |
| 13 | Italy |
| 14 | Finland |
| 15 | Belgium |
| 16 | Iceland |
| 17 | Ireland |
| 18 | Slovenia |

== See also ==
- Espirito Santo Trophy – biennial world amateur team golf championship for women organized by the International Golf Federation.
- European Amateur Team Championship – European amateur team golf championship for men organised by the European Golf Association.
- European Ladies Amateur Championship – European amateur individual golf championship for women organised by the European Golf Association.
