= Christine Wolf (golfer) =

Austrian professional golfer

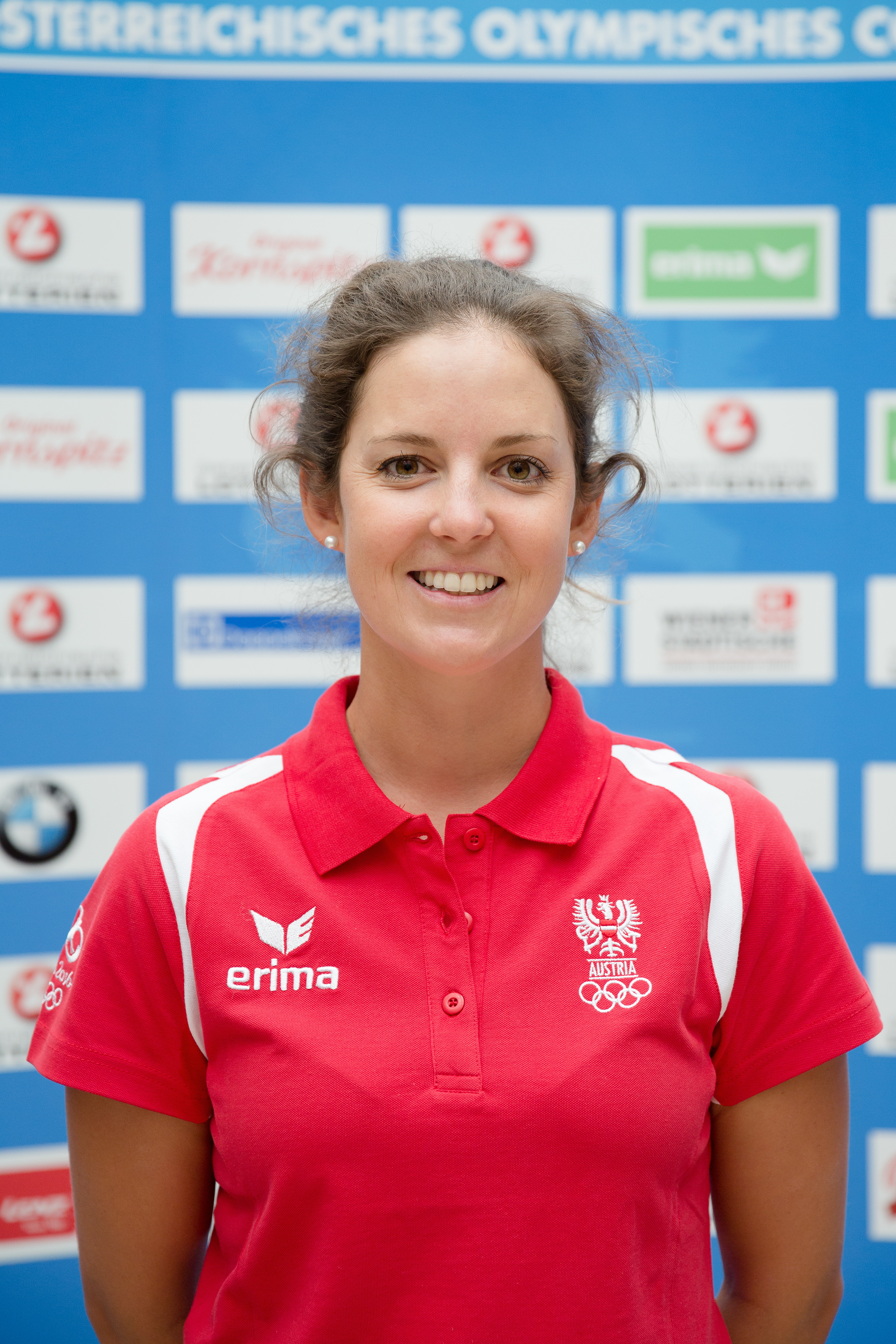
- Christine Wolf (2016)

Personal information
- Nationality: Austria
- Born: 3 May 1989 (age 37) Rum, Austria
- Height: 1.72 m (5 ft 8 in)

Career
- Sport: Golf
- College: University of Tennessee at Chattanooga
- Turned professional: 2012
- Current tour: Ladies European Tour
- Former tour: LET Access Series
- Professional wins: 2

Number of wins by tour
- Ladies European Tour: 1
- Other: 1

Best results in LPGA major championships
- Chevron Championship: DNP
- Women's PGA C'ship: DNP
- U.S. Women's Open: CUT: 2011, 2020
- Women's British Open: T61: 2021
- Evian Championship: CUT: 2021

Christine Wolf (born 5 March 1989) is an Austrian professional golfer.

Wolf is a graduate of the University of Tennessee at Chattanooga.

Wolf turned professional in 2012 and played on the LET Access Series from 2012 to 2013, winning one event. She has played on the Ladies European Tour since 2014.

In 2015, Wolf finished runner-up to Holly Clyburn at the NSW Women's Open, an ALPG Tour event.

Wolf qualified for the 2016 Summer Olympics, finishing in the 43rd place.

== Professional wins ==
=== Ladies European Tour wins (1) ===
- 2019 Hero Women's Indian Open

=== LET Access Series wins (1) ===
- 2012 Crete Ladies Open

== Team appearances ==
Amateur

- European Ladies' Team Championship (representing Austria): 2007, 2008, 2009, 2010

Professional

- European Championships (representing Austria): 2018
