= Terre Blanche Ladies Open =

Tournament information
- Location: Tourrettes, Var, Provence-Alpes-Côte d'Azur, France
- Established: 2010
- Course: Terre Blanche Golf Club
- Par: 72
- Tour: LET Access Series
- Format: 54-hole Stroke play
- Prize fund: €42,500
- Month played: April

Tournament record score
- Aggregate: 204 Valentine Derrey
- To par: –12 as above

Current champion
- (Denmark) Amalie Leth-Nissen

Location map
- Location in France Location in France

The Terre Blanche Ladies Open is a women's professional golf tournament played as part of the LET Access Series, held since 2010 at Domaine de Terre Blanche in Provence on the French Riviera.

== History ==
The tournament served as season opener for the LET Access Series, held in March or April, except in 2020 when it was moved to October due to the COVID-19 pandemic, before being cancelled.

== Winners ==
Year	Winner	Country	Score	Margin of victory	Runner(s)-up	Ref
2025	Amalie Leth-Nissen	Denmark	−10 (65-69-72=206)	3 strokes	(France) Sara Brentcheneff (a)	
2024	Anna Magnusson	Sweden	−9 (72-67-68=207)	1 stroke	(France) Sara Brentcheneff (a)	
2023	Louise Uma Landgraf (a)	France	−1 (69-74=143)^	Playoff	(Netherlands) Pasqualle Coffa (France) Charlotte Liautier	
2022	Lucrezia Colombotto Rosso	Italy	−7 (70-69-70=209)	Playoff	(Germany) Chiara Noja	
2021	Linn Grant	Sweden	−10 (68-66-72=206)	4 strokes	(Denmark) Amalie Leth-Nissen (a)	
2020	Tournament cancelled due to COVID-19 pandemic					
2019	Sarah Schober	Austria	−3 (71-70-72=213)	Playoff	(United States) Hayley Davis	
2018	Marita Engzelius	Norway	−8 (67-69=136)^	3 strokes	(Sweden) Emma Nilsson	
2017	Valentine Derrey	France	−12 (68-69-67=204)	8 strokes	(France) Sophie Giquel-Bettan (Spain) Mireia Prat	
2016	Luna Sobrón (a)	Spain	−8 (67-68-76=211)	1 stroke	(France) Lucie Andre (France) María Parra (a)	
2014–2015: No tournament
2013	Sophie Giquel-Bettan	France	−8 (72-70-69=211)	4 strokes	(Spain) Patricia Sanz Barrio	
2012	Marion Ricordeau	France	−5 (70-73-68=211)	3 strokes	(Australia) Rebecca Flood	
2011	Henni Zuël	England	−6 (140)^			
2010	Caroline Afonso	France	+5 (221)			

^Shortened to 36 holes due to weather

== See also ==
- French Riviera Masters – former European Senior Tour event at the same venue
