= Sophie Giquel-Bettan =

French professional golfer

Personal information
- Nationality: France
- Born: 12 July 1982 (age 44) Ploërmel, France
- Height: 166 cm (5 ft 5 in)

Career
- Sport: Golf
- Turned professional: 2003
- Former tours: Ladies European Tour (2004–2018); LPGA Tour (2008–2009)
- Professional wins: 3

Number of wins by tour
- Ladies European Tour: 1

Best results in LPGA major championships
- Chevron Championship: DNP
- Women's PGA C'ship: T34: 2008
- U.S. Women's Open: DNP
- Women's British Open: DNP
- Evian Championship: T38: 2014
Medal record
Mediterranean Games
| Silver medal – second place | 2001 Tunis | Women's team |
| Gold medal – first place | 2001 Tunis | Individual |

Sophie Giquel-Bettan (born 12 July 1982) is a retired French professional golfer who played on the Ladies European Tour and the U.S-based LPGA Tour. She won the 2007 Ladies Open of Portugal.

== Personal life and amateur career ==
Born Sophie Giquel in 1982 in Ploërmel, Brittany, she won the individual gold at the 2001 Mediterranean Games in Tunis and represented the Continent of Europe at the 2003 Vagliano Trophy held at County Louth Golf Club, Ireland.

In 2003, she lost the final of the French International Lady Juniors Amateur Championship to María Hernández, 2 and 1.

She married Axel Bettan, her caddie, in 2006 and changed her name to Giquel-Bettan. Her closest friends on tour were Marine Monnet, Linda Wessberg, Diana Luna and Patricia Meunier-Lebouc, who helped her settle on the LPGA Tour.

== Professional career ==
Giquel-Bettan finished runner-up behind Bettina Hauert of Germany at the 2003 Ladies European Tour Qualifying School and turned professional. In 2006, she was runner-up at the Ladies Italian Open, two strokes behind compatriot Gwladys Nocera, and finished a career-high 13th on the LET Order of Merit.

In 2007, she won her maiden professional title at the Ladies Open of Portugal, two strokes ahead of Louise Stahle of Sweden.

Giquel-Bettan played mainly on the LPGA Tour in 2008 and 2009, with best result a T11 finish at the 2008 Corona Championship, and a T34 finish at the Women's PGA Championship, her best finish in a major.

Back on the LET, in 2011 she was tied for fourth at the Finnair Masters and runner-up at the Ladies Swiss Open, one stroke behind Diana Luna of Italy, ending the season 22nd on the Order of Merit. In 2014, she finished third at the Lalla Meryem Cup, T4 at the Sberbank Golf Masters and T38 at the Women's British Open, to rise to 168th in the Women's World Golf Rankings.

She retired from tour in 2018, but stayed on the LET board, joining Canal Plus as a golf commentator.

== Professional wins (3) ==
=== Ladies European Tour wins (1) ===
| No. | Date | Tournament | Winning score | To par | Margin of victory | Runner-up |
|---|---|---|---|---|---|---|
| 1 | 1 Jul 2007 | Ladies Open of Portugal | 70-67-69=206 | −10 | 2 strokes | (Sweden) Louise Stahle |

=== LET Access Series wins (2) ===
| No. | Date | Tournament | Winning score | To par | Margin of victory | Runner-up |
|---|---|---|---|---|---|---|
| 1 | 23 Mar 2013 | Terre Blanche Ladies Open | 72-70-69=211 | −8 | 4 strokes | (Spain) Patricia Sanz Barrio |
| 2 | 18 Apr 2015 | Open Generali de Dinard | 70-66-71=207 | −9 | 1 stroke | (Spain) Virginia Espejo |

== Results in LPGA majors ==
| Tournament | 2004 | 2005 | 2006 | 2007 | 2008 | 2009 | 2010 | 2011 | 2012 | 2013 | 2014 |
|---|---|---|---|---|---|---|---|---|---|---|---|
| ANA Inspiration | | | | | | | | | | | |
| U.S. Women's Open | | | | | | | | | | | |
| Women's PGA Championship | | | | | T34 | CUT | | | | | |
| Women's British Open | CUT | | | CUT | | | CUT | T59 | CUT | | T38 |

Did not play

CUT = missed the half-way cut
"T" = tied

== Team appearances ==
Amateur

- European Ladies' Team Championship (representing France): 2003
- Vagliano Trophy (representing the Continent of Europe): 2003
