= Camilla Lennarth =

Swedish professional golfer (born 1988)

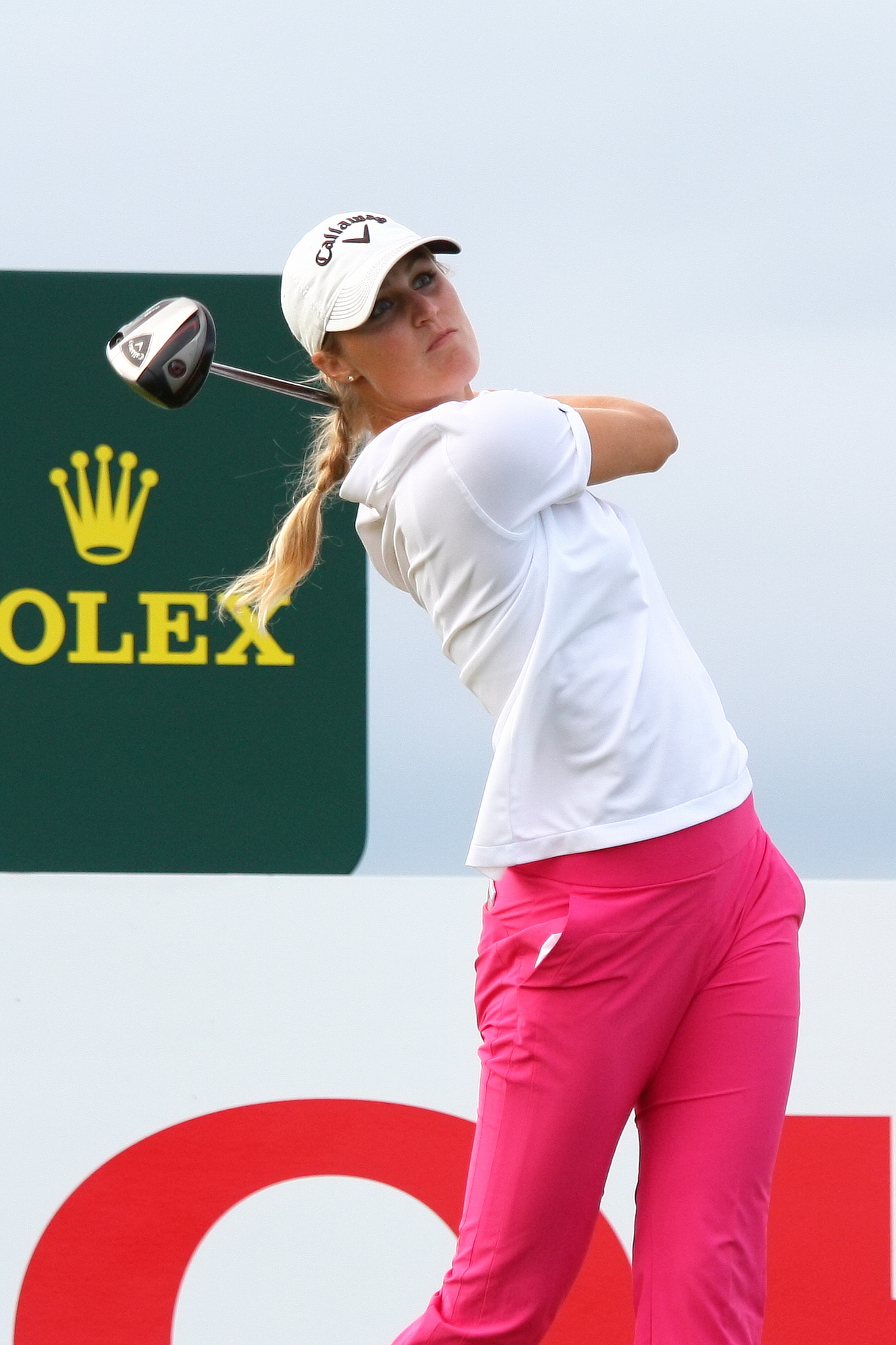

Personal information
- Full name: Anna Camilla Maria Lennarth
- Nationality: Sweden
- Born: 16 June 1988 (age 38) Stockholm, Sweden
- Height: 5 ft 10 in (1.78 m)

Career
- Sport: Golf
- College: University of Alabama
- Turned professional: 2012
- Former tours: Ladies European Tour (joined 2013); LPGA Tour (joined 2018); Symetra Tour (joined 2012)
- Professional wins: 5

Number of wins by tour
- Ladies European Tour: 1
- Other: 4

Best results in LPGA major championships
- Chevron Championship: DNP
- Women's PGA C'ship: DNP
- U.S. Women's Open: CUT: 2016
- Women's British Open: T37: 2016
- Evian Championship: CUT: 2014

Camilla Lennarth (born 16 June 1988) is a Swedish professional golfer. She played on the Ladies European Tour and U.S.-based LPGA Tour. She won the 2014 Ladies Slovak Open and held the first round lead at the 2013 Women's British Open.

== Early life ==
In 1988, Lennarth was born in Stockholm. She trained at Saltsjöbaden Golf Club. By 2004 she was a member of the National Team and played in the European Young Masters and the Junior Ryder Cup, where she was teamed with Rory McIlroy and Carlota Ciganda.

She played in the 2005 and 2006 European Girls' Team Championship, securing a silver in 2005 in a team with Anna Nordqvist, Linn Gustafsson, and Anna Dahlberg Söderström.

== Amateur career ==
From 2007 through 2011, Lennarth attended the University of Alabama. She played with the Alabama Crimson Tide women's golf team for four years. She was a three-time NCAA All-American.

In the summers, the played the European Ladies' Team Championship. She played on the team four times: in 2007, 2008, 2009, and 2010. Sweden won the event on home soil in 2008 with Anna Nordqvist, Pernilla Lindberg, Caroline Westrup, Jacqueline Hedwall and Caroline Hedwall. She also won the 2010 event at La Manga Club together with the Hedwall twins, as well as securing the individual medalist honors. During the fall of 2010, meanwhile, Sweden tied for the bronze prize at the Espirito Santo Trophy, held in Argentina, with teammates Louise Larsson and Caroline Hedwall.

== Professional career ==
In 2012, Lennarth turned professional. She joined the Symetra Tour, where she had a season-best tie for 5th at the Symetra Classic.

In 2013, she joined the Ladies European Tour after finishing 6th at Q-School. She was runner-up at the South African Women's Open and became the first round joint leader at the 2013 Women's British Open, where she carded a career low 66, six under par. She finished the season ranked 45th on the Order of Merit.

Lennarth won her maiden LET title at the Ladies Slovak Open in 2014, by four strokes over Mel Reid. The win propelled her to a career high of 105th in the Women's World Golf Rankings and she finished the season ranked 14th on the LET Order of Merit. In 2015, she won the Swedish Matchplay Championship, beating Louise Ridderström, 6 and 5, in the final.

In 2016, she finished tied for 3rd at the RACV Ladies Masters in Australia and again at the Ladies European Masters in Germany. She qualified for the 2016 U.S. Women's Open and made the cut at the 2016 Women's British Open to finish 9th on the LET Order of Merit, a career best. In 2017, after another 3rd place finish at the Fatima Bint Mubarak Ladies Open, she finished 12th.

Lennarth earned conditional status for the 2018 LPGA Tour through Q-School and played 14 tournaments, making the cut in half, to finish 142nd on the LPGA Tour money list.

She returned to the LET and in 2019 and 2020 she finished 37th and 41st in the LET rankings. In 2021, Lennarth played in only five LET events before having to cut her season short due to a hip injury. She served as the first tee starter at the remaining Aramco Team Series events for the rest of the year.

== Professional wins (5) ==
=== Ladies European Tour (1) ===
No.	Date	Tournament	Winning score	To par	Margin of victory	Runner-up
1	22 Jun 2014	Ladies Slovak Open	70-72-69-66=277	−11	4 strokes	(England) Mel Reid

=== Swedish Golf Tour (2) ===
No.	Date	Tournament	Winning score	To par	Margin of victory	Runner(s)-up
1	7 Aug 2011	VW Söderbergs Ladies Masters (as an amateur)	72-70-74=216	E	1 stroke	(Norway) Cecilie Lundgreen (Sweden) Madelene Sagström
1	28 Jun 2015	SM Match	6 and 5			(Sweden) Louise Ridderström

=== Other wins (2) ===
- 2014 Abbekås Open (Swedish Mini-tour Future Series)
- 2017 Lindesbergs Open (Swedish Mini-tour Future Series)

== Results in LPGA majors ==
Tournament	2013	2014	2015	2016	2017	2018	2019	2020
U.S. Women's Open				CUT				
Women's British Open	CUT	CUT	CUT	T37	CUT	CUT	CUT	T72
Evian Championship		CUT						

Did not play

CUT = missed the half-way cut
"T" = tied

== Team appearances ==
Amateur

- Junior Ryder Cup (representing Europe): 2004 (winners)
- European Young Masters (representing Sweden): 2004
- European Girls' Team Championship (representing Sweden): 2005, 2006
- European Ladies' Team Championship (representing Sweden): 2007, 2008 (winners), 2009, 2010 (winners)
- Espirito Santo Trophy (representing Sweden): 2010
