= Valentine Derrey =

French professional golfer

Personal information
- Nationality: France
- Born: 13 June 1987 (age 39) Paris, France
- Height: 160 cm (5 ft 3 in)

Career
- Sport: Golf
- College: Texas Christian University
- Turned professional: 2010
- Current tours: Ladies European Tour (joined 2011); LET Access Series
- Former tours: LPGA Tour (joined 2012); LPGA Futures Tour (2010–2011)
- Professional wins: 5

Number of wins by tour
- Ladies European Tour: 1
- Epson Tour: 1
- Other: 3

Best results in LPGA major championships
- Chevron Championship: DNP
- Women's PGA C'ship: DNP
- U.S. Women's Open: CUT: 2016
- Women's British Open: T45: 2014
- Evian Championship: CUT: 2014

Valentine Derrey (born 13 June 1987) is a French professional golfer. She reached 84 on the Women's World Golf Rankings in 2014 as she won the Turkish Ladies Open and finished seventh on the LET Order of Merit.

== Amateur career ==
Derrey was a nine-year member of the French National Team 2001–2009, three-time winner of the French Junior Championship (2001, 2004, 2005) and 2005 French Cup champion. She was runner-up at the 2004 Girls Amateur Championship. She played collegiate golf with the TCU Horned Frogs at Texas Christian University in Fort Worth where she recorded 11 top-10 finishes including one win.

== Professional career ==
Derrey turned professional in October 2010 and played on the LPGA Futures Tour in 2010 and 2011 where she won the 2011 Tate & Lyle Players Championship. She finished seventh on the season ending 2011 LPGA Futures Tour Money List to gain membership of the LPGA Tour for the 2012 season.

Derrey also joined the Ladies European Tour (LET) in 2011 and recorded twelve top-10 finishes 2012–2017, including runner-up at the Lacoste Ladies Open de France and Hero Women's Indian Open in 2013, and her win in the 2014 Turkish Ladies Open. Her best seasons were 2013 and 2014 where she finished tenth and seventh on the LET Order of Merit rankings respectively. She was ranked 98th on the Women's World Golf Rankings at the end of 2014 after peaking at 84.

== Professional wins (5) ==
=== Ladies European Tour wins (1) ===
No.	Date	Tournament	Winning score	To par	Margin of victory	Runner-up
1	11 May 2014	Turkish Ladies Open	73-69-70=212	−4	2 strokes	(Denmark) Malene Jörgensen

=== LPGA Futures Tour wins (1) ===
No.	Date	Tournament	Winning score	To par	Margin of victory	Runners-up
1	19 Jun 2011	Tate & Lyle Players Championship	68-69-67-68=272	–16	5 strokes	(Australia) Leanne Bowditch, (United States) Tiffany Joh

=== LET Access Series wins (3) ===
No.	Date	Tournament	Winning score	To par	Margin of victory	Runner(s)-up
1	15 Jun 2014	Open Generali de Dinard	66-69-66=201	−6	2 strokes	(Sweden) Isabella Ramsay
2	2 Apr 2017	Terre Blanche Ladies Open	68-69-67=204	–12	8 strokes	(France) Sophie Giquel-Bettan, (Spain) Mireia Prat
3	26 May 2017	Forget Foundation PGA Championship	73-68-69=210	−6	1 stroke	(Sweden) Frida Gustafsson-Spång

== Team appearances ==
Amateur

- European Lady Junior's Team Championship (representing France): 2004
- European Ladies' Team Championship (representing France): 2007, 2008, 2009, 2010
