= Julie Tvede =

Danish professional golfer (born 1980)

Personal information
- Nationality: Denmark
- Born: 21 May 1980 (age 46) Frederiksberg, Denmark
- Height: 170 cm (5 ft 7 in)

Career
- Sport: Golf
- College: University of Tulsa
- Turned professional: 2004
- Former tours: Ladies European Tour (2008–2014); Swedish Golf Tour (2007); LPGA Futures Tour (2004–2006)
- Professional wins: 5

Julie Tvede (born 21 May 1980) is a Danish professional golfer who played on the LPGA Futures Tour and the Ladies European Tour.

== Amateur career ==
Tvede was member of the Danish national team from 1998 to 2004. She was runner-up in the 2000 and 2001 Danish National Championship and she represented Denmark at the Espirito Santo Trophy in 2002 with Mette Buus and Lisa Holm Sørensen.

She played college golf at the University of Tulsa and won the Western Athletic Conference in 2003.

== Professional career ==
Tvede turned professional in June 2004 and joined the LPGA Futures Tour, where she played until 2006. In 2004 she won the Colorado Women's Open and the Mexico Women's Open. She played the 2005 Nykredit Masters on the LET on an invitation and finished T26.

In 2007 she joined the Swedish Golf Tour where she was runner-up in her first event, the Telia Grand Opening at Ljunghusen Golf Club in May, and in August won the Swedish Matchplay Championship against Caroline Hedwall.

Tvede joined the Ladies European Tour in 2008 and in September finished tied 5th at the Nykredit Masters in her native Denmark. In 2009 she won the South African Women's Open, although not yet an LET-sanctioned event. She came close capturing a second Swedish Matchplay Champion title, losing in the final to Louise Larsson.

In November 2010 she won a tournament in the inaugural season of the LET Access Series, the LET's new feeder tour. She became the Murcia Ladies Open Champion after playing the par five 18th hole three times in the sudden death play off on Saturday evening until darkness fell, and a further two extra play off holes the next morning.

She retired from tour after the 2014 season.

== Professional wins (5) ==
=== Sunshine Ladies Tour (1) ===
- 2009 South African Women's Open

=== LET Access Series (1) ===
- 2010 Murcia Ladies Open

=== Swedish Golf Tour (1) ===
- 2007 Swedish Matchplay Championship

=== Other (2) ===
- 2004 Colorado Women's Open
- 2004 Mexico Women's Open

== Team appearances ==
Amateur

- Espirito Santo Trophy (representing Denmark): 2002
- European Ladies' Team Championship (representing Denmark): 2003
