= Holly Clyburn =

English professional golfer (born 1991)

Personal information
- Nationality: England
- Born: 7 February 1991 (age 35) Grimsby, England
- Height: 1.64 m (5 ft 5 in)

Career
- Sport: Golf
- Turned professional: 2012
- Current tours: Ladies European Tour; LPGA Tour
- Professional wins: 4

Number of wins by tour
- Ladies European Tour: 1
- WPGA Tour of Australasia: 2
- Other: 1

Best results in LPGA major championships
- Chevron Championship: DNP
- Women's PGA C'ship: T50: 2017
- U.S. Women's Open: CUT: 2014
- Women's British Open: T26: 2012
- Evian Championship: T27: 2013

Holly Clyburn (born 7 February 1991) is an English professional golfer who currently plays on the Ladies European Tour. She was a member of the victorious 2012 Great Britain and Ireland Curtis Cup team and won her first professional tournament at the Deloitte Ladies Open in 2013, her rookie year on tour.

== Amateur career ==
Clyburn was twice a member of the Great Britain and Ireland Curtis Cup team, selected in both 2010 and 2012. At the 2012 event, she won three of her five matches, playing in all sessions and contributing three points to a first victory for GB&I since 1996. She also qualified for the 2012 Women's British Open for the first time finishing tied for 26th, the second highest placed amateur. Clyburn turned professional in October 2012.

== Professional career ==
In December 2012, Clyburn tied 25th at the Lalla Aicha Tour School to earn her tour card for the 2013 Ladies European Tour. In her rookie year of 2013, she won her first tournament, the Deloitte Ladies Open in Amsterdam, and finished 7th on the LET Order of Merit. The latter was helped by two additional top 10 finishes, tied 6th at the Turkish Airlines Ladies Open and 3rd at the Ladies Scottish Open. In addition Clyburn appeared at two majors, the Women's British Open where she tied for 36th and the Evian Championship, where she tied for 27th. She was narrowly beaten to the title of LET Rookie of the Year by Charley Hull, when Hull placed higher in the final tournament of the season.

In 2014, Clyburn secured more top ten finishes, including tied for 6th at the Lalla Meryem Cup, tied for 9th at the Turkish Airlines Ladies Open, and runner-up to Florentyna Parker at the Ladies Italian Open. She appeared at major championships the Women's British Open and came through qualifying for the U.S. Women's Open but missed the cut at both.

In March 2015, Clyburn secured her second professional victory at the ALPG season ending event, the Bing Lee Fujitsu NSW Women's Open. The win was her first on the ALPG Tour.

== Professional wins (4) ==
=== Ladies European Tour (1) ===
No.	Date	Tournament	Winning score	To par	Margin of victory	Runner-up
1	26 May 2013	Deloitte Ladies Open	71-69-71=211	−8	3 strokes	(England) Charley Hull

=== ALPG Tour wins (2) ===
No.	Date	Tournament	Winning score	To par	Margin of victory	Runners-up
1	24 Jan 2015	Bing Lee Fujitsu NSW Women's Open	69-66-70=205	−11	1 stroke	(Australia) Rebecca Artis, (Switzerland) Fabienne In-Albon, (Scotland) Vikki Laing, (Austria) Christine Wolf
2	8 Mar 2020	Findex Yamba Pro-Am	69	−4	1 stroke	(Japan) Kaori Toki

=== LET Access Series wins (1) ===
- 2012 Banesto Tour Valencia

== Team appearances ==
Amateur

- European Ladies' Team Championship (representing England ): 2009, 2010, 2011
- Curtis Cup (representing Great Britain & Ireland): 2010, 2012 (winners)
- Espirito Santo Trophy (representing England): 2010
- Vagliano Trophy (representing Great Britain & Ireland): 2011
- Astor Trophy (representing Great Britain and Ireland): 2011 (winners)

Professional

- International Crown (representing England): 2016
- The Queens (representing Europe): 2017
- European Championships (representing Great Britain): 2018
