= 2010 LET Access Series =

Professional women's golf tour

2010 LET Access Series season
- Duration: March 2010 – November 2010
- Number of official events: 5
- Most wins: 2 (tie): (France) Caroline Afonso (France) Jade Schaeffer
- Order of Merit winner: (France) Caroline Afonso

The 2010 LET Access Series was a series of professional women's golf tournaments held from March through November 2010 across Europe. The LET Access Series is the second-tier women's professional golf tour in Europe and is the official developmental tour of the Ladies European Tour.

== Tournament results ==
The table below shows the 2010 schedule. The numbers in brackets after the winners' names show the number of career wins they had on the LET Access Series up to and including that event.

Dates	Tournament	Location	Prize fund (€)	Winner
16–18 Mar	Terre Blanche Ladies Open	France	25,000	(France) Caroline Afonso (1)
15–17 Apr	Dinard Ladies Open	France	30,000	(France) Jade Schaeffer (1)
9–11 Jun	La Nivelle Ladies Open	France	25,000	(France) Caroline Afonso (2)
14–16 Oct	Trophée Preven's	France	25,000	(France) Jade Schaeffer (2)
18–21 Nov	Murcia Ladies Open	Spain	20,000	(Denmark) Julie Tvede (1)

== Order of Merit rankings ==
The top two players on the LETAS Order of Merit earned LET membership for the Ladies European Tour. Players finishing in positions 3–20 got to skip the first stage of the qualifying event and automatically progress to the final stage of the Lalla Aicha Tour School.

Rank	Player	Country	Events	Points	Status earned
1	Caroline Afonso	France	4	16,300	Promoted to LET
2	Jade Schaeffer	France	3	13,200	Promoted to LET
3	Julie Tvede	Denmark	5	12,133	
4	Holly Aitchison	England	4	9,550	
5	Barbara Genuini	France	5	8,650	
6	Julie Greciet	France	4	7,600	
7	Rhian Wyn Thomas	Wales	5	7,510	
8	Ana Larraneta	Spain	3	6,900	
9	Camille Fallay	France	3	6,450	
10	Natalie David-Mila	France	5	6,400	

== See also ==
- 2010 Ladies European Tour
- 2010 in golf
