= Jade Schaeffer =

French professional golfer (born 1986)

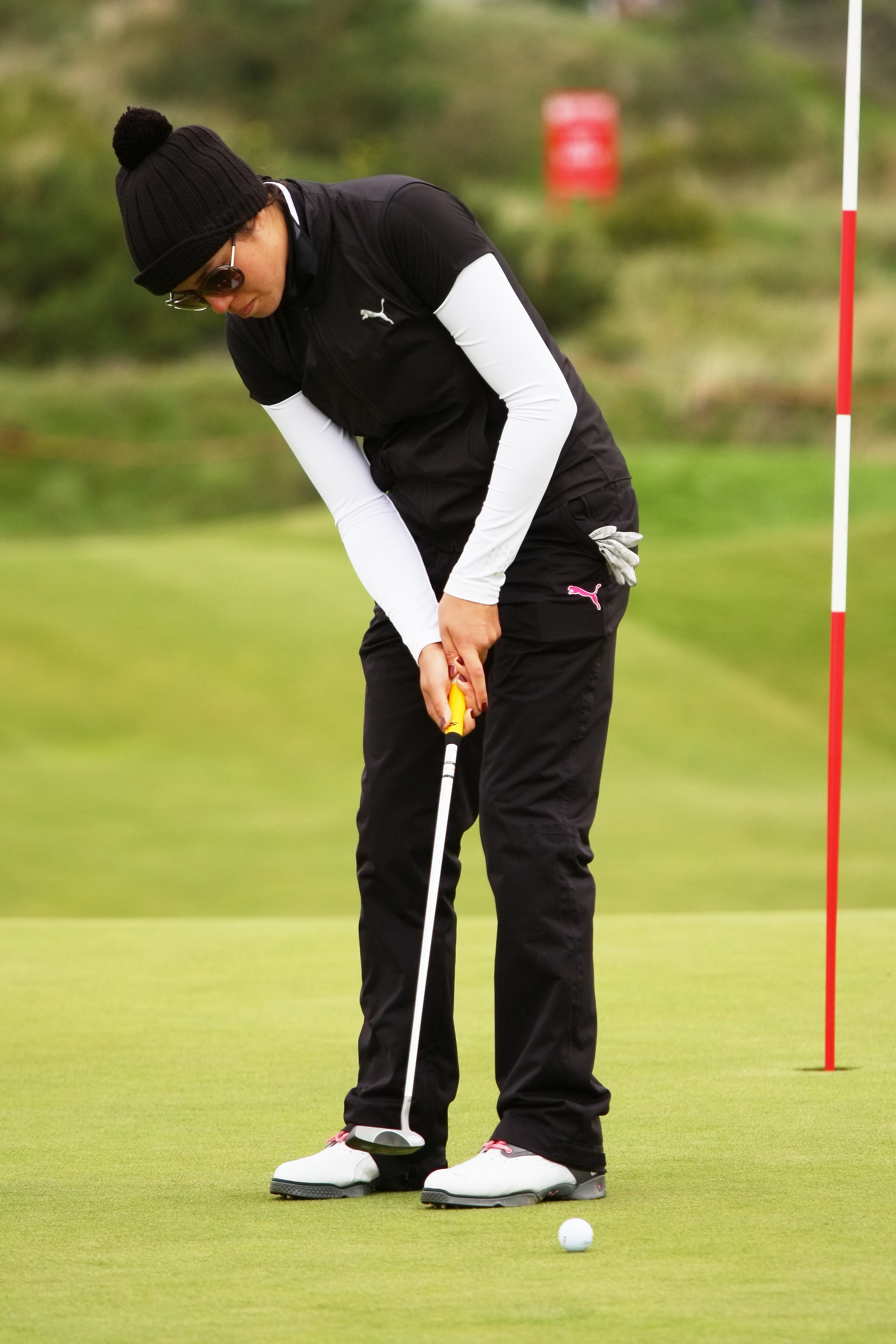
- Schaeffer at the 2010 Women's British Open

Personal information
- Full name: Jade Schaeffer-Calmels
- Nationality: France
- Born: 1 July 1986 (age 40) Réunion
- Height: 1.69 m (5 ft 7 in)

Career
- Sport: Golf
- Turned professional: 2006
- Former tours: LET (2007–2017); LET Access Series
- Professional wins: 4

Number of wins by tour
- Ladies European Tour: 2
- Other: 2

Best results in LPGA major championships
- Chevron Championship: DNP
- Women's PGA C'ship: DNP
- U.S. Women's Open: CUT: 2016
- Women's British Open: T27: 2009
- Evian Championship: DNP

Jade Schaeffer (born 1 July 1986) is a French professional golfer and former Ladies European Tour player. She won the 2009 Ladies German Open and the 2011 Raiffeisenbank Prague Golf Masters.

== Career ==
Schaeffer had success as an amateur and won the European Ladies Amateur Championship in 2005, which also earned her a start at the 2006 Women's British Open.

She turned professional in 2006 and joined the Ladies European Tour in 2007. In her rookie season, she finished 3rd at the Ladies Open of Portugal and recorded two further top-5 finishes.

In 2009, she won her maiden professional title at the Ladies German Open, prevailing in a playoff over Paula Marti of Spain, and in 2011 she won the Raiffeisenbank Prague Golf Masters. In 2012 she made it into the top-200 on the Women's World Golf Rankings and was runner up at the Sanya Ladies Open in China, two strokes behind her compatriot Cassandra Kirkland. In 2015, she tied for 4th at the Omega Dubai Ladies Masters.

Schaeffer made the cut at the 2009 Women's British Open and qualified for the 2016 U.S. Women's Open through winning the sectional qualifying tournament in Buckinghamshire, England.

Schaeffer also participated in the inaugural season of the LET Access Series in 2010, securing two titles on French soil to finish second in the rankings.

== Personal life ==
Schaeffer is married to European Tour player François Calmels.

She has an older sister, Fanny, who also is a professional golfer and played on the LET between 2004 and 2007.

== Amateur wins ==
- 2005 European Ladies Amateur Championship

== Professional wins (4) ==
=== Ladies European Tour wins (2) ===
No.	Date	Tournament	Winning score	To par	Margin of victory	Runner-up
1	24 May 2009	Ladies German Open	66-72-70-67=275	−13	Playoff	(Spain) Paula Martí
2	11 Sep 2011	Raiffeisenbank Prague Golf Masters	69-64-70=203	−13	2 strokes	(France) Julie Greciet

Ladies European Tour playoff record (1–0)

No.	Year	Tournament	Opponent	Result	Ref
1	2009	Ladies German Open	(Spain) Paula Martí	Won with birdie on first playoff hole	

=== LET Access Series wins (2) ===
- 2010 Dinard Ladies Open, Trophée Preven's

== Team appearances ==
Amateur

- European Lady Junior's Team Championship (representing France): 2004
- European Ladies' Team Championship (representing France): 2005
