= Lucie André =

French professional golfer

Personal information
- Nationality: France
- Born: 17 January 1988 (age 38) Bourg-en-Bresse, France
- Height: 1.71 m (5 ft 7 in)

Career
- Sport: Golf
- Turned professional: 2011
- Current tour: LET Access Series
- Former tour: Ladies European Tour (joined 2011)
- Professional wins: 2

Best results in LPGA major championships
- Chevron Championship: DNP
- Women's PGA C'ship: DNP
- U.S. Women's Open: DNP
- Women's British Open: CUT: 2015
- Evian Championship: DNP

Lucie André (born 17 January 1988) is a French professional golfer who has played on the Ladies European Tour (LET). She was the No. 1 ranked amateur in Europe 2009 after winning the Spanish Ladies Amateur and the Vagliano Trophy. She won the 2017 Czech Ladies Challenge.

== Early life and amateur career ==
André started to play golf aged 11, introduced by her parents, at Bourg en Bresse Golf Club in Bourg-en-Bresse. She had a successful amateur career and was the leading ladies amateur golfer on the 2009 EGA Women's Amateur Rankings.

She was runner-up behind Carlota Ciganda at the 2008 French Ladies Amateur. In 2009, she won the Spanish Ladies Amateur and was runner-up at the Portuguese Ladies Amateur. In 2010, she won the German Ladies Amateur.

André won the Vagliano Trophy with the European team in 2009. She played in the Espirito Santo Trophy in 2008 and 2010. In 2010, she finished tied for third together with Alexandra Bonetti and Manon Gidali.

She was the leading amateur on the 2010 LET Access Series, and was low amateur after a tie for 16th at the 2010 Open de France Feminin.

== Professional career ==
André turned professional in January 2011 after finishing T5 at the LET Final Qualifying School, and joined the Ladies European Tour.

She finished T4 at the 2011 Lacoste Ladies Open de France, two strokes behind Felicity Johnson. In 2015, she was T4 at the Deloitte Ladies Open, T7 at the Turkish Airlines Ladies Open and T8 at the Omega Dubai Ladies Masters. She qualified for the 2015 Women's British Open as one of the top 25 on the LET Order of Merit not otherwise exempt, but did not make the cut.

In March 2016, a T16 at the Lalla Meryem Cup propelled her into the top 300 in the Women's World Golf Rankings.

In 2017, she was relegated to the LET Access Series, where she played the next five seasons. She won the 2017 Czech Ladies Challenge following a playoff. She was promoted on the Ladies European Tour at the end of the year.

== Amateur wins ==
- 2009 Spanish International Ladies Amateur Championship
- 2010 German International Ladies Amateur Championship

== Professional wins (2) ==
=== LET Access Series wins (2) ===
| No. | Date | Tournament | Winning score | To par | Margin of victory | Runners-up |
|---|---|---|---|---|---|---|
| 1 | 24 Jun 2017 | Foxconn Czech Ladies Challenge | 69-68=137 | −5 | Playoff | (Austria) Nina Muehl (France) Agathe Sauzon |
| 2 | 3 Mar 2023 | Santander Golf Tour Girona | 72-72-70=214 | +1 | Playoff | (Netherlands) Marit Harryvan (Denmark) Sofie Kibsgaard Nielsen (England) Emily Price (Sweden) Emma Thorngren |

== Team appearances ==
Amateur

- Espirito Santo Trophy (representing France): 2008, 2010
- Vagliano Trophy (representing the Continent of Europe): 2009 (winners)
- European Ladies' Team Championship (representing France): 2008, 2009, 2010
- European Girls' Team Championship (representing France): 2005
