= Carly Booth =

Scottish professional golfer (born 1992)

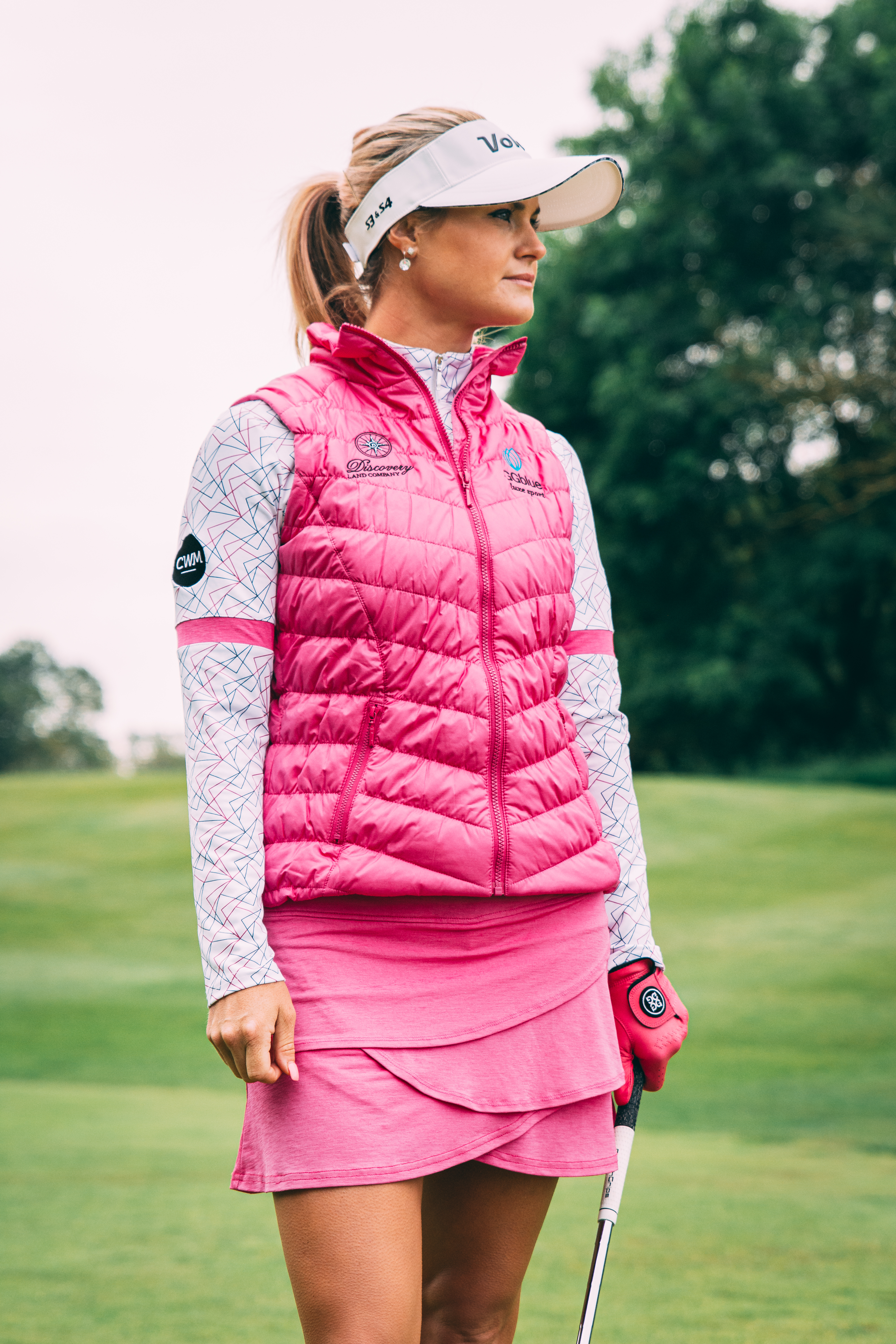
- Booth at Forest of Arden in 2019

Personal information
- Nationality: Scotland
- Born: 21 June 1992 (age 34) Comrie, Scotland
- Height: 5 ft 6 in (1.68 m)

Career
- Sport: Golf
- Turned professional: 2009
- Current tour: Ladies European Tour
- Professional wins: 4

Number of wins by tour
- Ladies European Tour: 3
- Other: 1

Best results in LPGA major championships
- Chevron Championship: DNP
- Women's PGA C'ship: DNP
- U.S. Women's Open: CUT: 2013, 2017
- Women's British Open: T71: 2015
- Evian Championship: CUT: 2021

Carly Booth (born 21 June 1992) is a Scottish professional golfer. At the end of 2009, aged 17, she became the youngest-ever Scot to qualify for the Ladies European Tour. Booth became the youngest ladies' club champion in Britain at the age of 11 at Dunblane New.

== Early life and amateur career ==
As a youngster, Booth was able to practice on the course made exclusively for her and her brother, professional golfer Wallace, by her father Wally at the family farm near Comrie. Wally was a Commonwealth Games silver medalist wrestling champion.

Booth enjoyed an amateur career richly laced with records and accolades, being described as a Scottish golfing prodigy. Aged 12, she played with Sandy Lyle in the British Masters Pro-Am and at 14 she appeared in her first professional event, the Ladies Scottish Open, and finished 13th. She was rated the No. 1 junior in Europe after winning the European Junior Masters in 2007, the same year she lifted the Scottish Under-18 and Under-21 titles.

In 2008, she became the youngest player to represent Great Britain & Ireland in the 76-year history of the Curtis Cup, facing the Americans in the 35th staging of that match at St Andrews. She also played at the Junior Ryder Cup in 2006 and 2008 and won the Daily Telegraph Finals in 2007 and 2008. In 2010, she finished 14th at LET Final Stage Qualifying School for 2010.

== Professional career ==
Upon turning professional, Booth had a golf scholarship to complete at Glenalmond College in Scotland. She started there after returning from America, where a stay at David Leadbetter's Academy in Florida was followed by a spell at a school in Arizona.

Booth made her professional debut on the Ladies European Tour at the 2011 Lalla Meryem Cup in Morocco. She won her first event in May 2012 at the Aberdeen Asset Management Ladies Scottish Open. She won her second event in June at the Deutsche Bank Ladies Swiss Open. Booth did not achieve her third win on the Ladies European tour until August 2019, when she won the Tipsports Czech Ladies Open.

She also appeared nude in the 2013 ESPN The Magazine's "Body Issue".

== Amateur wins ==
- 2007 Scottish Girls U18, Scottish Girls U21, Daily Telegraph Finals, European Young Master
- 2008 Scottish Girls U18, Daily Telegraph Finals

== Professional wins (4) ==
=== Ladies European Tour (3) ===
No.	Date	Tournament	Winning score	To par	Margin of victory	Runners-up	Winner's share (€)
1	5 May 2012	Aberdeen Asset Management Ladies Scottish Open	70-71-71=212	–4	1 stroke	(Australia) Frances Bondad (England) Florentyna Parker	32,706
2	17 Jun 2012	Deutsche Bank Ladies Swiss Open	70-71-67-68=276	–12	Playoff	(Germany) Caroline Masson (Germany) Anja Monke	78,750
3	25 Aug 2019	Tipsports Czech Ladies Open^	68-69-70=207	–9	1 stroke	(England) Hayley Davis (France) Anais Meyssonnier (Finland) Sanna Nuutinen (England) Charlotte Thompson	19,200

=== LET Access Series wins (2) ===
- 2012 Dinard Ladies Open
- 2019 Tipsports Czech Ladies Open^

^ Dual-ranked by the Ladies European Tour and LET Access Series

== Team appearances ==
Amateur

- European Girls' Team Championship (representing Scotland): 2005
- Junior Ryder Cup (representing Europe): 2006 (tie, Cup retained), 2008
- Women's Home Internationals (representing Scotland): 2007, 2009
- Curtis Cup (representing Great Britain & Ireland): 2008
- European Ladies' Team Championship (representing Scotland): 2009

Professional

- The Queens (representing Europe): 2017
