= Noemí Jiménez =

Spanish professional golfer (born 1993)

Personal information
- Full name: Noemí Jiménez Martín
- Nationality: Spain
- Born: 12 November 1993 (age 32) Marbella, Spain
- Height: 5 ft 6 in (168 cm)

Career
- Sport: Golf
- College: Arizona State University
- Turned professional: 2015
- Current tour: Ladies European Tour (joined 2016)
- Professional wins: 3

Best results in LPGA major championships
- Chevron Championship: DNP
- Women's PGA C'ship: DNP
- U.S. Women's Open: DNP
- Women's British Open: CUT: 2018
- Evian Championship: DNP

Achievements and awards
- Edith Cummings Munson Award: 2015

Noemí Jiménez Martín (born 12 November 1993) is a professional golfer from Spain and member of the Ladies European Tour (LET).

== Early life and amateur career ==
Jiménez was born in Marbella in 1993 to Antonio Jiménez and Mercedes Martín. She had a successful amateur career and won the 2010 French International Ladies Amateur Championship. She was a semi-finalist at the British Ladies Amateur in 2013, and she lost a playoff at the 2014 European Ladies Amateur Championship to compatriot Luna Sobrón.

Jiménez was a member of the Spanish National Team that won the 2013 European Ladies' Team Championship, alongside Camilla Hedberg, Luna Sobron, Natalia Escuriola, Marta Sanz Barrio and Patricia Sanz Barrio. She played on the winning Vagliano Trophy team in 2013 and 2015, and represented Spain in the 2014 Espirito Santo Trophy alongside Marta Sanz Barrio and Luna Sobrón.

Jiménez attended Arizona State University from 2011 to 2015 and played golf with the Arizona State Sun Devils women's golf team. She received the 2015 Edith Cummings Munson Golf Award.

== Professional career ==
Jiménez turned professional in 2015 and joined the 2016 Ladies European Tour. As a rookie, she finished T8 at the New Zealand Women's Open and T10 at the Tipsport Golf Masters.

In 2017, she made a few starts on the LET Access Series, where she was runner-up at the Bossey Ladies Championship in France, losing a playoff to Jane Turner of Scotland, and T3 at the WPGA International Challenge in England. The following year, she secured a title at the VP Bank Ladies Open in Switzerland. She also played in 14 LET events with a best result a T10 in the Jabra Ladies Open, and was T11 at the Lalla Meryem Cup and the Ladies European Thailand Championship.

In 2018, Jiménez also qualified for the Women's British Open as one of the top 25 on the LET Order of Merit not otherwise qualified, but did not make the cut. In 2019, she was T12 at the Women's NSW Open and at the South African Women's Open, and rose to just outside the top 300 in the Women's World Golf Rankings.

In 2021, she won the Regione Piemonte Pro-Am, preceding the Ladies Italian Open.

== Amateur wins ==
- 2010 French International Ladies Amateur Championship
- 2013 Cal Classic, Darrius Rucker Intercollegiate
- 2014 NCAA D1 West Regional

== Professional wins (3) ==
=== LET Access Series wins (1) ===
No.	Date	Tournament	Winning score	To par	Margin of victory	Runner-up	Ref
1	6 May 2018	VP Bank Ladies Open	69-69-66=204	–12	1 stroke	(Spain) Elia Folch (Belgium) Chloé Leurquin	

=== Santander Golf Tour (2) ===
- 2016 Santander Golf Tour Zaudín
- 2019 Santander Golf Tour Sevilla (with Silvia Bañón)

== Team appearances ==
Amateur

- Vagliano Trophy (representing the Continent of Europe): 2013 (winners), 2015 (winners)
- European Ladies' Team Championship (representing Spain): 2011, 2013 (winners), 2014, 2015
- Espirito Santo Trophy (representing Spain): 2014

Professional

- European Golf Team Championships (representing Spain): 2018
