= Patricia Sanz Barrio =

Spanish professional golfer (born 1990)

Personal information
- Nickname: Patti
- Nationality: Spain
- Born: 9 September 1990 (age 36) Madrid, Spain
- Height: 5 ft 7 in (170 cm)

Career
- Sport: Golf
- College: Auburn University
- Turned professional: 2013
- Current tours: Ladies European Tour (joined 2014); Symetra Tour (joined 2014)
- Former tour: LET Access Series (joined 2013)
- Professional wins: 2
Medal record
Mediterranean Games
Gold medal – first place	2018 Tarragona	Women's team

Patricia Sanz Barrio (born 9 September 1990) is a professional golfer from Spain. She has played on the Ladies European Tour (LET) and the U.S-based Symetra Tour.

== Early life and amateur career ==
Sanz was born in Madrid to Carmelo Sanz and Marina Barrio, who introduced her to golf at age 7. Her younger sister, Marta Sanz Barrio, is also an LET player and played golf at Auburn University from 2010 to 2014.

As a junior golfer, she was the 2009 Spanish National Champion at the Spanish Amateur Women's Doubles, playing alongside her sister, Marta. She was runner-up at the 2010 Madrid Championship, defeated by Marta on the final hole.

Sanz was a member of the Spanish National Team that won the 2013 European Ladies' Team Championship, alongside Noemí Jiménez, Camilla Hedberg, Luna Sobrón, Natalia Escuriola and her sister Marta.

Sanz played golf at Auburn University in Alabama from 2008 to 2012 and majored in microbiology. With the Auburn Tigers in the Southeast Conference, she was SEC Individual Champion (2012) and SEC Team Champion (2009, 2011, 2012).

She won the individual title at the 2013 European Nations Cup – Copa Sotogrande 7 strokes ahead of runner-up Chloe Williams.

== Professional career ==
Sanz joined the LET Access Series in 2013 and was runner-up at Terre Blanche Ladies Open, the Fourqueux Ladies Open and the HLR Golf Academy Open, before winning the Grecotel Amirandes Ladies Open on the Greek island of Crete in October. She finished second on the 2013 LETAS Order of Merit behind Mireia Prat, earning a full card for the LET.

In 2014, her rookie year on the LET, Sanz played in 18 tournaments and kept her card with a best performance of T12 at the Ladies Slovak Open.

She won the women's team gold at the 2018 Mediterranean Games with Natalia Escuriola and Marta Sanz Barrio.

Between 2017 and 2019, Sanz played mainly on the Symetra Tour, but did not place high enough on the money list to advance to the LPGA Tour. In 2019, she returned to LET Qualifying School where she finished 27th, and in 2020, 2021 and 2022 she played on the LET, where she missed a majority of the cuts.

Along with her sister, she received a sponsor's invite to compete in the 2023 Aramco Saudi Ladies International which featured a record $5 million purse, but did not make the cut.

== Amateur wins ==
- 2009 Spanish Amateur Women's Doubles Championship (with Marta Sanz Barrio)
- 2012 SEC Championship
- 2013 European Nations Cup – Copa Sotogrande

== Professional wins (2) ==
=== LET Access Series wins (1) ===
No.	Date	Tournament	Winning score	To par	Margin of victory	Runner-up	Ref
1	26 Oct 2013	Grecotel Amirandes Ladies Open	72-73-68=213	E	Playoff	(Sweden) Julia Davidsson	

=== Santander Golf Tour wins (1) ===
- 2017 Santander Golf Tour Zaragoza

== Team appearances ==
Amateur

- European Ladies' Team Championship (representing Spain): 2013 (winners)

Professional

- Mediterranean Games (representing Spain): 2018 (winners)
