= Ribeira Sacra Patrimonio de la Humanidad International Ladies Open =

Ribeira Sacra "Patrimonio de la Humanidad" International Ladies Open
Tournament information
- Location: Lugo, Galicia, Spain
- Established: 2013
- Courses: Augas Santas Balneario & Golf Resort
- Par: 70
- Tour: LET Access Series
- Format: 54-hole Stroke play
- Prize fund: €35,000
- Final year: 2019

Tournament record score
- Aggregate: 194 Johanna Gustavsson
- To par: –16 as above

Final champion
- (England) Rachael Goodall

The Ribeira Sacra "Patrimonio de la Humanidad" International Ladies Open was a women's professional golf tournament on the LET Access Series, held between 2013 and 2019 near Lugo in the autonomous community of Galicia, Spain.

The tournament, always played at the Augas Santas Balneario & Golf Resort, was first introduced as the Ocho Golf Ladies Open – Galicia in 2013. In 2014 it was renamed the OCA Augas Santas International Ladies Open, the fourth event of the LETAS season and the only event in Spain on the schedule that year. The following season the tournament was renamed after Ribeira Sacra, a Spanish World Heritage Site (Patrimonio de la Humanidad) nomination.

== Winners ==
Year	Winner	Country	Score	Margin of victory	Runner(s)-up	Ref
Ribeira Sacra "Patrimonio de la Humanidad" International Ladies Open
2019	Rachael Goodall	England	−11 (70-61-68=199)	2 strokes	(Italy) Lucrezia Colombotto Rosso	
2018	Johanna Gustavsson	Sweden	−16 (64-64-66=194)	6 strokes	(France) Astrid Vayson de Pradenne	
2017	Emma Goddard	England	−6 (68-68-68=204)	Playoff	(France) Salomé Zasio (a)	
2016	Marion Duvernay	France	−4 (65-67=132)	Playoff	(Scotland) Michele Thomson	
2015	Michele Thomson	Scotland	−6 (69-69-66=204)	4 strokes	(Spain) Natalia Escuriola (a) (Spain) Maria Palacios Siegenthaler (Finland) Sanna Nuutinen (Spain) Luna Sobrón (a)	
OCA Augas Santas International Ladies Open
2014	Mia Piccio	Philippines	−8 (65-68-69=202)	1 stroke	(Italy) Vittoria Valvassori	
Ocho Golf Ladies Open – Galicia
2013	Mireia Prat	Spain	−8 (68-65-69=202)	1 stroke	(Australia) Bree Arthur	
