= Marta Sanz Barrio =

Spanish professional golfer (born 1992)

Personal information
- Nationality: Spain
- Born: 27 August 1992 (age 34) Madrid, Spain
- Height: 5 ft 3 in (160 cm)

Career
- Sport: Golf
- College: Auburn University
- Turned professional: 2014
- Current tours: Ladies European Tour (joined 2015); Symetra Tour (joined 2015)
- Former tour: LET Access Series (joined 2014)
- Professional wins: 3

Number of wins by tour
- Epson Tour: 2

Best results in LPGA major championships
- Women's British Open: 74: 2016
Medal record
Mediterranean Games
Gold medal – first place	2018 Tarragona	Individual
Gold medal – first place	2018 Tarragona	Women's team

Marta Sanz Barrio (born 27 August 1992) is a professional golfer from Spain. She has played on the Ladies European Tour (LET) and the U.S-based Symetra Tour, where she has two victories.

== Early life and amateur career ==
Sanz was born in Madrid in 1992 to Carmelo Sanz and Marina Barrio, who introduced her to golf at 5. Her older sister, Patricia Sanz Barrio, is also an LET player and played golf at Auburn University from 2008 to 2012.

As a junior golfer, she was a seven-time winner of the Madrid Regional Ranking and finished within the top five at both the 2009 Spanish National Championship U-18 and the 2009 Madrid Regional Championship U-21. She was the 2009 Spanish National Champion at the Spanish Amateur Women's Doubles, playing alongside her sister, Patricia. She won the 2010 Madrid Championship, defeating Patricia on the final hole.

She was a member of the Spanish National Team that won the 2013 European Ladies' Team Championship, alongside Noemí Jiménez, Camilla Hedberg, Luna Sobrón, Natalia Escuriola and sister Patricia. She represented Europe in the 2013 Vagliano Trophy and played in the Espirito Santo Trophy twice.

Sanz played golf at Auburn University from 2010 to 2014. In 2011, she won the Lady Tar Heel Invitational and was named to the Southeastern Conference (SEC) All-Freshman Team. In 2012, she was an NGCA and Golfweek Honorable Mention All-American and in 2013 she was a WGCA Honorable Mention All-American selection.

In 2014, she was selected as Global Golf Post All-Am Team and ranked 10th on World Amateur Golf Ranking.

== Professional career ==
Sanz joined the LET Access Series in 2014 and was runner-up at Royal Belgian Golf Federation LETAS Trophy and won the Ingarö Ladies Open. She finished T43 at the LPGA Final Qualifying Tournament to obtain conditional status on the LPGA Tour for 2015.

In 2015, her rookie year on the LET, Sanz played in 11 LET tournaments with a T6 at the New Zealand Women's Open, and finished the season 59th in the Order of Merit. In 2016 she competed in 14 LET tournaments and finished 35th in the Order of Merit. Her best performance of the season came at the Qatar Ladies Open where she finished T9. She made the cut at the 2016 Women's British Open, her first major. In 2017, from nine starts on the LET, her best finish was T7 at the Sanya Ladies Open.

Sanz won the women's individual gold at the 2018 Mediterranean Games, and gold in the women's team event with Natalia Escuriola and sister Patricia.

In 2018, she won the FireKeepers Casino Hotel Championship on the Symetra Tour and from seven starts on the LET her best finish was a T8 on home soil in the Open de España Femenino. In 2019, she played in 21 events on the Symetra Tour where she earned a third title in the IOA Golf Classic. She also played in six tournaments on the LET with a best finish of T11 at the Fatima Bint Mubarak Ladies Open and kept her full card for 2020. In 2020, she played in nine LET tournaments recording a season-best of T4 in the team event at the Saudi Ladies Team International, teamed with Jenny Haglund. She finished 61st on the 2021 Symetra Tour money list.

== Amateur wins ==
- 2009 Spanish Amateur Women's Doubles Championship (with Patricia Sanz Barrio)
- 2010 Madrid Championship
- 2011 Lady Tar Heel Invitational

== Professional wins (4) ==
=== Symetra Tour wins (2) ===
No.	Date	Tournament	Winning score	To par	Margin of victory	Runner-up	Ref
1	19 Aug 2018	FireKeepers Casino Hotel Championship	69-69-65=213	–3	1 stroke	(Canada) Augusta James	
2	29 Sep 2019	IOA Golf Classic	64-67-69=200	–13	1 stroke	(Thailand) Mind Muangkhumsakul	

=== LET Access Series wins (1) ===
No.	Date	Tournament	Winning score	To par	Margin of victory	Runner-up	Ref
1	9 Aug 2014	Ingarö Ladies Open	70-69-65=204	–6	3 strokes	(Switzerland) Caroline Rominger	

== Team appearances ==
Amateur

- European Ladies' Team Championship (representing Spain): 2013 (winners), 2014
- Espirito Santo Trophy (representing Spain): 2012, 2014

Professional

- Mediterranean Games (representing Spain): 2018 (winners)
