= Crete Ladies Open =

Golf club

Tournament information
- Location: Crete, Greece
- Established: 2012
- Course: Crete Golf Club
- Par: 72
- Tour: LET Access Series
- Format: 54-hole Stroke play
- Prize fund: €30,000
- Month played: October
- Final year: 2014

Tournament record score
- Aggregate: 203 Tonje Daffinrud
- To par: –13 as above

Final champion
- (Norway) Tonje Daffinrud

The Crete Ladies Open was a women's professional golf tournament on the LET Access Series, held between 2012 and 2014 in Crete, Greece.

The tournament was played at Crete Golf Club, the only 18-hole golf course on Crete, the largest and most populous of the Greek Islands and the second largest in the eastern Mediterranean Sea. The inaugural tournament saw the first two days cancelled due to strong winds reaching 77 miles per hour. Austrian Christine Wolf took the title on the first play-off hole. Tonje Daffinrud secured promotion to the Ladies European Tour with her win in 2014.

== Winners ==
Year	Winner	Country	Score	Margin of victory	Runner(s)-up	Ref
Grecotel Amirandes Ladies Open
2014	Tonje Daffinrud	Norway	–13 (66-67-70=203)	3 strokes	(Denmark) Daisy Nielsen	
2013	Patricia Sanz Barrio	Spain	E (72-73-68=213)	Playoff	(Sweden) Julia Davidsson	
Crete Ladies Open
2012	Christine Wolf	Austria	–4 (67) (Note: First two rounds cancelled due to strong winds.)	Playoff	(Netherlands) Chrisje De Vries	
