= Nicole Broch Estrup =

Danish professional golfer (born 1993)

Personal information
- Nationality: Denmark
- Born: 14 May 1993 (age 33) Hillerød, Denmark

Career
- Sport: Golf
- Turned professional: 2013
- Current tours: Ladies European Tour; LPGA Tour
- Former tours: Symetra Tour; LET Access Series
- Professional wins: 5

Number of wins by tour
- Ladies European Tour: 1
- Epson Tour: 1
- Other: 3

Best results in LPGA major championships
- Chevron Championship: T60: 2018
- Women's PGA C'ship: CUT: 2016, 2017, 2018, 2019, 2020, 2021, 2026
- U.S. Women's Open: T38: 2016
- Women's British Open: T17: 2016
- Evian Championship: T11: 2015

Achievements and awards
- Ladies European Tour Player of the Year: 2015

Nicole Broch Estrup (née Larsen) (born 14 May 1993) is a Danish professional golfer who plays on the LPGA Tour and the Ladies European Tour (LET).

Broch Estrup started playing golf at the age of nine. She reached 11th on World Amateur Golf Ranking in 2012 before turning professional.

She led from start to finish over four rounds to win the 2015 Helsingborg Open on the Ladies European Tour at Vasatorp Golf Club in Sweden. She finished third on the LET Order of Merit in 2015 and was named 2015 LET Player of the Year

She represented Denmark at the 2016 Olympic Games in Rio de Janeiro and finished 36th.

She gained an LPGA Tour card for 2017 via the LPGA Final Qualifying Tournament. She finished tied third at the 2017 Canadian Pacific Women's Open. In 2019, she reached an LPGA Tour career best finish as runner-up at the same tournament, the CP Women's Open. In 2021, she finished tied 35th in LPGA Q-Series to earn LPGA Tour membership for the 2022 season.

In 2022, she finished tied second, losing in a play-off, won by Klára Davidson Spilková, in the KPMG Women's Irish Open on the Ladies European Tour.

== Professional wins (5) ==
=== Ladies European Tour wins (1) ===
No.	Date	Tournament	Winning score	To par	Margin of victory	Runner-up
1	6 Sep 2015	Helsingborg Open	68-69-68-75=280	−8	1 stroke	(South Africa) Ashleigh Simon

Ladies European Tour playoff record (0–1)

No.	Year	Tournament	Opponents	Result
1	2022	KPMG Women's Irish Open	(Czech Republic) Klára Spilková (Finland) Ursula Wikström	Spilková won with birdie on first extra hole

=== Symetra Tour wins (1) ===
No.	Date	Tournament	Winning score	To par	Margin of victory	Runner-up
1	16 Oct 2016	Symetra Tour Championship	64-68-67-67=266	−18	Playoff	(United States) Ally McDonald

Symetra Tour playoff record (1–1)

No.	Year	Tournament	Opponent	Result
1	2016	Guardian Retirement Championship	(United States) Brittany Altomare	Lost on fifth extra hole
2	2016	Symetra Tour Championship	(United States) Ally McDonald	Won with birdie on first extra hole

=== LET Access Series (2) ===
No.	Date	Tournament	Winning score	To par	Margin of victory	Runner(s)-up
1	11 Aug 2013	HLR Golf Academy Open	72-70-68=210	−3	Playoff	(Switzerland) Fabienne In-Albon (Spain) Patricia Sanz Barrio
2	20 Sep 2013	Ladies Norwegian Challenge	73-66-73=212	−4	4 strokes	(South Africa) Laurette Maritz

LET Access Serie playoff record (1–1)

No.	Year	Tournament	Opponent(s)	Result
1	2012	Samsø Ladies Open	(Sweden) Antonella Cvitan	Lost to par on first extra hole
2	2013	HLR Golf Academy Open	(Switzerland) Fabienne In-Albon (Spain) Patricia Sanz Barrio	

=== Other wins (1) ===
No.	Date	Tournament	Winning score	To par	Margin of victory	Runner-up
1	7 Apr 2024	Australian Women's Classic	66	−6	Title shared with (Taiwan) Tsai Pei-ying and (Australia) Jess Whitting (Note: The LET and WPGA Tour of Australasia co-sanctioned tournament was terminated after only 18 holes due to heavy rain. As a result, the title was shared between three players and it was classed as unofficial, with no Order of Merit points or official money.)	

== Results in LPGA majors ==
Results not in chronological order.

Tournament	2015	2016	2017	2018	2019	2020	2021	2022	2023	2024	2025	2026
Chevron Championship				T60		76	T63					
U.S. Women's Open		T38		CUT		CUT						
Women's PGA Championship		CUT	CUT	CUT	CUT	CUT	CUT					CUT
The Evian Championship	T11		T18	CUT	T62	NT	CUT			CUT		
Women's British Open	T24	T17	T62	CUT	T67		T42	CUT	T44	T37		CUT

Did not play

CUT = missed the half-way cut
NT = no tournament
"T" = tied

=== Summary ===
Tournament	Wins	2nd	3rd	Top-5	Top-10	Top-25	Events	Cuts made
Chevron Championship	0	0	0	0	0	0	3	3
U.S. Women's Open	0	0	0	0	0	0	3	1
Women's PGA Championship	0	0	0	0	0	0	7	0
The Evian Championship	0	0	0	0	0	2	6	3
Women's British Open	0	0	0	0	0	2	10	7
Totals	0	0	0	0	0	4	29	14

- Most consecutive cuts made – 3 (twice)

== Team appearances ==
Amateur

- European Girls' Team Championship (representing Denmark): 2010
- European Ladies' Team Championship (representing Denmark): 2009, 2011, 2013
- Espirito Santo Trophy (representing Denmark): 2012
- Vagliano Trophy (representing the Continent of Europe): 2013 (winners)
