= My Leander =

Swedish golfer

Personal information
- Nationality: Sweden
- Born: 12 September 1994 (age 32) Södertälje, Sweden
- Height: 5 ft 7 in (1.70 m)

Career
- Sport: Golf
- College: San José State University
- Turned professional: 2018
- Current tours: LET Access Series; Swedish Golf Tour
- Professional wins: 2

Best results in LPGA major championships
- Chevron Championship: DNP
- Women's PGA C'ship: DNP
- U.S. Women's Open: DNP
- Women's British Open: 77th: 2017
- Evian Championship: DNP

Achievements and awards
- Mountain West Women's Golfer of the Year: 2016–17

My Leander (born 12 September 1994) is a Swedish professional golfer. She made the cut at the 2017 Women's British Open, was runner-up at the 2019 WPGA International Challenge, and won the 2022 Rose Ladies Open in England.

== Amateur career ==
Leander was successful on the junior golf circuit in Sweden, amassing 7 career titles. She was runner-up at the 2012 Annika Invitational Europe, 2 strokes behind Linnea Ström.

Leander started playing college golf San Jose State Spartans women's golf team at San José State University in the fall of 2013 and graduated in 2017. She was named 2016–17 Mountain West Women's Golfer of the Year. Her stroke average in the 2016–17 season was the best in school history, shooting 17 rounds under par and six rounds of par and winning two tournaments, the Colonel Wollenberg's Ram Classic and Meadow Club Intercollegiate, and placed second at three other tournaments.

By 2017, she had a World Amateur Golf Ranking of 28 and got onto the national team. Leander helped the Swedish team to place third at the European Ladies' Team Championship in Portugal.

Leander made the cut at the 2017 Women's British Open at Kingsbarns Golf Links in Scotland. She qualified as an amateur by shooting three-under and finishing fifth at the final qualifying, just days before play began. Leander started the tournament with a one-under 71 in the first round and a two-under 70 in the second round, and she was just one of three amateurs to make the cut. In her final two rounds, she shot 77 and 79 to finish nine-over and in 77th place.

== Professional career ==
Leander turned professional early 2018 and started playing on the LET Access Series and the Swedish Golf Tour, where she won the 2018 Nes Open in Norway, having prevailed in a playoff against Frida Gustafsson-Spång.

In 2019, she was runner-up at the WPGA International Challenge in England, one stroke behind Manon De Roey.

In 2022, she finished 14th at the Mithra Belgian Ladies Open and 15th at the VP Bank Swiss Ladies Open, her best finishes on the Ladies European Tour so far. In September, she won the Rose Ladies Open at Brocket Hall in England, three strokeas ahead of Noemí Jiménez Martín.

== Amateur wins ==
- 2008 Skandia Tour SGDF Syd #5
- 2010 Skandia Tour Regional #3 - Stockholm Södra
- 2011 Alex Norén Junior Open
- 2012 Skandia Tour Regional #3 - Stockholm Södra
- 2014 HP Junior Open
- 2015 HP Junior Open, Vikingaskeppet JMI
- 2016 Colonel Wollenberg's Ram Classic
- 2017 Meadow Club Women's Intercollegiate

== Professional wins (2) ==
=== LET Access Series wins (1) ===
No.	Date	Tournament	Winning score	Margin of victory	Runner-up
1	25 Sep 2022	Rose Ladies Open	−3 (72-73-68=213)	3 strokes	(Spain) Noemí Jiménez Martín

=== Swedish Golf Tour wins (1) ===
No.	Date	Tournament	Winning score	Margin of victory	Runner-up
1	22 May 2018	Nes Open	−2 (73-70-71=214)	Playoff	(Sweden) Frida Gustafsson-Spång

== Results in LPGA majors ==
Tournament	2017
ANA Inspiration	
Women's PGA Championship	
U.S. Women's Open	
Women's British Open	77
The Evian Championship	

Did not play

== Team appearances ==
Amateur

- European Ladies' Team Championship (representing Sweden): 2017
