= 2016 Women's British Open =

Coordinates: 51.991°N 0.665°W

2016 Ricoh Women's British Open
Tournament information
- Dates: 28–31 July 2016
- Location: Milton Keynes, Buckinghamshire, England
- Courses: Woburn Golf & Country Club; Marquess' Course
- Organized by: Ladies' Golf Union
- Tours: Ladies European Tour; LPGA Tour

Statistics
- Par: 72
- Length: 6,463 yards (5,910 m)
- Field: 144 players, 75 after cut
- Cut: 145 (+1)
- Prize fund: $3,000,000 €2,680,444
- Winner's share: $412,047 €368,156

Champion
- (Thailand) Ariya Jutanugarn
- 272 (−16)

Location in England
Location in Buckinghamshire

The 2016 Ricoh Women's British Open was played 28–31 July in England at the Woburn Golf and Country Club near Milton Keynes, Buckinghamshire, northwest of London. It was the 40th Women's British Open, and the 16th as a major championship on the LPGA Tour. It was the tenth Women's British Open at Woburn; the most recent was in 1999, prior to it becoming a major on the LPGA Tour. For the first time, it was held on the Marquess' Course, which opened in 2000.

Ariya Jutanugarn won her first major title, three strokes ahead of runners-up Mirim Lee and| Mo Martin, the 2014 champion.

Golf Channel and NBC televised the event in the United States for the first time, while BBC Sport handled the coverage in the UK, for the last time.

== Course layout ==
Woburn Golf and Country Club

Hole	1	2	3	4	5	6	7	8	9	Out	10	11	12	13	14	15	16	17	18	In	Total
Yards	380	475	418	383	359	159	507	166	420	3267	344	514	299	407	180	529	385	150	388	3196	6463
Par	4	5	4	4	4	3	5	3	4	36	4	5	4	4	3	5	4	3	4	36	72

== Field ==
The field for the tournament is set at 144, and most earn exemptions based on past performance on the Ladies European Tour, the LPGA Tour, previous major championships, or with a high ranking in the Women's World Golf Rankings. The rest of the field earn entry by successfully competing in qualifying tournaments open to any female golfer, professional or amateur, with a low handicap.

There are 17 exemption categories for the 2016 Women's British Open.

1. The top 15 finishers (and ties) from the 2015 Women's British Open.

- Amy Boulden, Cristie Kerr, Kim Hyo-joo (8,12), Lydia Ko (8,9-LPGA,12), Minjee Lee (8), Teresa Lu, Maria McBride, Mika Miyazato, Anna Nordqvist (8), Suzann Pettersen (12), Melissa Reid, Ryu So-yeon, Luna Sobrón Galmés (a), Yani Tseng (11)
- Inbee Park (11,12), injury, and Ko Jin-young did not play

2. The top 10 Ladies European Tour members in the Women's World Golf Rankings as of 28 June not exempt under (1).

- Carlota Ciganda, Shanshan Feng (3,5,8,9-LET,12), Sandra Gal, Charley Hull (3,5), Karine Icher (5), Xi Yu Lin (5), Catriona Matthew (5,11), Azahara Muñoz, Su-Hyun Oh (3,5), Lee-Anne Pace

3. The top 30 LPGA Tour members in the Women's World Golf Rankings as of 28 June not exempt under (1).

- Chella Choi, Choi Na-yeon (12), Chun In-gee (9-KLPGA,12), Brooke Henderson (8,12), Jang Ha-na (8), Ji Eun-hee, Ariya Jutanugarn (8), Kim Sei-young (8), Jessica Korda, Candie Kung, Brittany Lang (12), Alison Lee, Mirim Lee, Stacy Lewis (11), Brittany Lincicome (12), Mo Martin (11), Haru Nomura (8), Park Hee-young, Pornanong Phatlum, Gerina Piller, Morgan Pressel, Jenny Shin (8), Lexi Thompson (8,12)

4. The top 25 on the current LET money list as of 28 June not exempt under (1) or (2).

- Beth Allen, Rebecca Artis, Isabelle Boineau (8), Lina Boqvist, Nicole Broch Larsen, Katie Burnett (5), Holly Clyburn (5), Georgia Hall, Nuria Iturrioz (8), Felicity Johnson, Stacey Keating, Camilla Lennarth, Chloe Leurquin, Nanna Koerstz Madsen (8), Caroline Masson (5), Becky Morgan, Florentyna Parker, Emily Kristine Pedersen, Pamela Pretswell, Marianne Skarpnord, Noora Tamminen, Kylie Walker, Linda Wessberg, Angel Yin, Liz Young

5. The top 40 on the current LPGA Tour money list as of 28 June not exempt under (1) or (3).

- Marina Alex, Baek Kyu-jung, Jacqui Concolino, Paula Creamer, Austin Ernst, Jodi Ewart Shadoff, M. J. Hur, Tiffany Joh, Moriya Jutanugarn, Danielle Kang, Kim Kaufman, Megan Khang, Christina Kim, In-Kyung Kim, Lee Mi-hyang, Pernilla Lindberg, Gaby López, Ai Miyazato, Ryann O'Toole, Beatriz Recari, Paula Reto, Lizette Salas, Alena Sharp, Jennifer Song, Nontaya Srisawang, Angela Stanford, Kelly Tan, Karrie Webb, Jing Yan, Sakura Yokomine, Yoo Sun-young (12)

6. The top five on the current LPGA of Japan Tour (JLPGA) money list as of 28 June not exempt under (1), (2), (3), or (13).

- Bae Hee-kyung, Asuka Kashiwabara, Yukari Nishiyama, Ai Suzuki, Momoko Ueda

7. The top two on the current LPGA of Korea Tour (KLPGA) money list as of 28 June not exempt under (1), (2), (3), or (6).

- Park Sung-hyun
- Jang Su-yeon did not play

8. Winners of any recognised LET or LPGA Tour events in the calendar year 2016.

- Lee Jung-min, Jiyai Shin (11,13)

9. Winners of the 2015 LET, LPGA, JLPGA and KLPGA money lists.

- all already exempt

10. Players ranked in the top 30 of the Women's World Golf Rankings as of 28 June, not exempt above.

- all already exempt

11. Winners of the last 10 editions of the Women's British Open.

- Lorena Ochoa and Sherri Steinhauer did not play

12. Winners of the last five editions of the U.S. Women's Open, ANA Inspiration, and Women's PGA Championship, and the Evian Championship winners from 2013 to 2015.

- Michelle Wie

13. Winner of the 2015 Japan LPGA Tour Championship Ricoh Cup.

- already exempt

14. The leading five LPGA Tour members upon completion of 36 holes in the 2016 Cambia Portland Classic who have entered the Championship and who are not otherwise exempt.

- Brianna Do, Lee Lopez, Kelly Shon, Mariajo Uribe, Cheyenne Woods

15. The leading three LET members in the 2016 Aberdeen Asset Management Ladies Scottish Open, who have entered the Championship and who are not otherwise exempt.

- Caroline Hedwall, Gwladys Nocera, Isabella Ramsay

16. The 2016 British Ladies Amateur champion, 2015 U.S. Women's Amateur champion, 2015 International European Ladies Amateur Championship champion, winner or next available player in the 2015 LGU Order of Merit, and the Mark H. McCormack Medal holder provided they are still amateurs at the time of the Championship and a maximum of two other leading amateurs at the discretion of the Ladies' Golf Union.

- Julia Engström, Leona Maguire, Olivia Mehaffey, Hannah O'Sullivan, María Parra

17. Any players granted special exemptions from qualifying by the Championship Committee.

- Laura Davies

18. Balance of the 90 LPGA Tour members

- Brittany Altomare, Ilhee Lee, Sarah Jane Smith

Qualifiers: Aditi Ashok, Laetitia Beck, Cydney Clanton, Charlotte Ellis, Maha Haddioui, Lydia Hall, Mina Harigae, Wei-Ling Hsu, Vicky Hurst, Bronte Law (a), Maude-Aimee Leblanc, Amelia Lewis, Annie Park, Marta Sanz, Ashleigh Simon, Anne van Dam

- Isabel Gabsa did not play due to a back injury

== Round summaries ==
=== First round ===
Thursday, 28 July 2016

Mirim Lee tied the Women's British Open (and women's major) single-round record by shooting a 62 (10 under par). She led by three strokes over Ariya Jutanugarn.

Place	Player	Score	To par
1	(South Korea) Mirim Lee	62	−10
2	(Thailand) Ariya Jutanugarn	65	−7
3	(China) Shanshan Feng	66	−6
T4	(South Korea) Lee Mi-hyang	67	−5
T4	(United States) Stacy Lewis	67	−5
T6	(South Korea) Jang Ha-na	68	−4
T6	(United States) Mo Martin	68	−4
T6	(Spain) Azahara Muñoz	68	−4
T6	(Canada) Alena Sharp	68	−4
T6	(Australia) Sarah Jane Smith	68	−4

=== Second round ===
Friday, 29 July 2016

Mirim Lee followed her record 62 in the first round with a 1-under-par 71 in the second round but still led by one stroke over Shanshan Feng and Ariya Jutanugarn. Catriona Matthew shot the low round of the day, 65, to move into a tie for fourth place.

Place	Player	Score	To par
1	(South Korea) Mirim Lee	62-71=133	−11
T2	(China) Shanshan Feng	66-68=134	−10
T2	(Thailand) Ariya Jutanugarn	65-69=134	−10
T4	(South Korea) Jang Ha-na	68-67=135	−9
T4	(Scotland) Catriona Matthew	70-65=135	−9
6	(United States) Mo Martin	68-68=136	−8
7	(United States) Stacy Lewis	67-70=137	−7
T8	(South Korea) Kim Sei-young	69-69=138	−6
T8	(Australia) Karrie Webb	69-69=138	−6
T10	(England) Charley Hull	69-70=139	−5
T10	(Spain) Azahara Muñoz	68-71=139	−5
T10	(South Korea) Ryu So-yeon	69-70=139	−5
T10	(South Africa) Ashleigh Simon	71-68=139	−5
T10	(United States) Lexi Thompson	72-67=139	−5

=== Third round ===
Saturday, 30 July 2016

Ariya Jutanugarn shot a third round 66 to take a two-stroke lead over Mirim Lee.

Place	Player	Score	To par
1	(Thailand) Ariya Jutanugarn	65-69-66=200	−16
2	(South Korea) Mirim Lee	62-71-69=202	−14
3	(United States) Mo Martin	68-68-69=205	−11
4	(Scotland) Catriona Matthew	70-65-71=206	−10
5	(United States) Stacy Lewis	67-70-70=207	−9
T6	(China) Shanshan Feng	66-68-74=208	−8
T6	(South Korea) Jang Ha-na	68-67-73=208	−8
T6	(United States) Lexi Thompson	72-67-69=208	−8
T6	(Australia) Karrie Webb	69-69-70=208	−8
10	(Republic of Ireland) Leona Maguire (a)	71-70-68=209	−7

=== Final round ===
Sunday, 31 July 2016

The day's low score was 67 by Caroline Masson, who played early and climbed up to tie for 25th place. Among those on the leaderboard, the best score was 70; Jutanugarn carded 72 and won by three strokes. The lead was four strokes over Mo Martin at the turn, but after a double bogey at 13, it was down to one over Mirim Lee, who birdied the first three holes of the back nine. Jutanugarn birdied 17 to extend the lead to two strokes, then Lee bogeyed the final hole to drop into a tie for second with Martin.

Place	Player	Score	To par	Money (US$)
1	(Thailand) Ariya Jutanugarn	65-69-66-72=272	−16	412,047
T2	(South Korea) Mirim Lee	62-71-69-73=275	−13	213,144
T2	(United States) Mo Martin	68-68-69-70=275	−13	213,144
4	(United States) Stacy Lewis	67-70-70-70=277	−11	138,645
T5	(South Korea) Jang Ha-na	68-67-73-71=279	−9	93,108
T5	(Scotland) Catriona Matthew	70-65-71-73=279	−9	93,108
T5	(Australia) Karrie Webb	69-69-70-71=279	−9	93,108
T8	(South Korea) Chun In-gee	72-71-67-70=280	−8	60,644
T8	(South Korea) Ryu So-yeon	69-70-71-70=280	−8	60,644
T8	(United States) Lexi Thompson	72-67-69-72=280	−8	60,644

==== Scorecard ====
Final round

Hole	1	2	3	4	5	6	7	8	9	10	11	12	13	14	15	16	17	18
Par	4	5	4	4	4	3	5	3	4	4	5	4	4	3	5	4	3	4
(Thailand) Jutanugarn	−16	−17	−17	−17	−17	−18	−18	−18	−17	−17	−17	−17	−15	−15	−15	−15	−16	−16
(South Korea) Lee	−14	−13	−13	−12	−12	−12	−12	−12	−11	−12	−13	−14	−14	−14	−14	−14	−14	−13
(United States) Martin	−11	−11	−12	−11	−11	−11	−12	−13	−13	−13	−13	−13	−13	−13	−13	−13	−13	−13
(United States) Lewis	−9	−9	−9	−9	−10	−11	−11	−10	−10	−10	−10	−10	−10	−9	−9	−10	−10	−11
(South Korea) Jang	−8	−8	−7	−7	−7	−7	−8	−8	−8	−8	−7	−8	−9	−9	−9	−9	−9	−9
(Scotland) Matthew	−10	−11	−11	−12	−12	−11	−11	−10	−10	−10	−10	−10	−9	−10	−10	−9	−10	−9
(Australia) Webb	−8	−8	−8	−8	−8	−8	−8	−8	−8	−8	−8	−9	−10	−10	−10	−10	−9	−9
(South Korea) Chun	−5	−6	−6	−5	−5	−5	−6	−6	−6	−6	−6	−6	−6	−7	−7	−7	−8	−8
(South Korea) Ryu	−7	−8	−8	−8	−8	−8	−9	−9	−9	−9	−10	−10	−9	−7	−8	−8	−8	−8
(United States) Thompson	−8	−8	−8	−8	−9	−9	−9	−9	−8	−7	−7	−7	−8	−8	−8	−8	−8	−8

Cumulative tournament scores, relative to par

Birdie	Bogey	Double bogey
