= Santander Golf Tour Burgos =

Tournament information
- Location: Castile and León, Spain
- Established: 2018
- Course: Naturávila
- Par: 72
- Tours: Santander Golf Tour; LET Access Series
- Format: Stroke play
- Prize fund: €45,000
- Month played: May

Current champion
- (Mexico) Alejandra Llaneza

The Santander Golf Tour Burgos is a women's professional golf tournament on Spain's Santander Golf Tour that has featured on the LET Access Series. It was first played in 2018 and is held in the autonomous community Castile and León in northwestern Spain.

== Winners ==
Year	Tour (Note: Several installments have been hosted under co-sanctioning agreement with the LET Access Series (LETAS))	Winner	Country	Score	Margin of victory	Runner(s)-up	Purse (€)	Venue	Ref
Santander Golf Tour Ávila
2025	LETAS	Alejandra Llaneza	Mexico	−9 (74-69-64=207)	Playoff	(Australia) Justice Bosio (Netherlands) Lauren Holmey	45,000	Naturávila	
2024	LETAS	Helen Briem (a)	Germany	−14 (70-62-70=202)	1 stroke	(Sweden) Kajsa Arwefjäll	45,000	Naturávila	
Santander Golf Tour Burgos
2023		Mireia Prat	Spain	−12 (66-66=132)	3 strokes	(Spain) Nuria Iturrioz	20,000	Lerma Golf	
2022	LETAS	Verena Gimmy	Germany	−13 (67-67-69=203)	3 strokes	(Switzerland) Vanessa Knecht (a) (Czech Republic) Sára Kousková	40,000	Lerma Golf	
2021		Marta Pérez (a)	Spain	Match play		(Spain) Natalia Escuriola	20,000	Lerma Golf	
Santander Golf Tour Lerma
2020	LETAS	Luna Sobrón	Spain	−12 (64-72-68=204)	Playoff	(France) Anaelle Carnet (Spain) Mireia Prat	35,000	Lerma Golf	
Santander Golf Tour Burgos
2019		María Palacios	Peru	−8 (67-69=136)	1 stroke	(Spain) Laura Goméz	20,000	Lerma Golf	
2018		Mireia Prat	Spain	−6 (69-69=138)	3 stroke	(Spain) Natalia Escuriola (Spain) Camilla Hedberg	20,000	Lerma Golf	
