= Mineks & Regnum Ladies Classic =

Professional golf tournament

Tournament information
- Location: Belek, Antalya, Turkey
- Established: 2013
- Course: National Golf Club
- Par: 72
- Tour: LET Access Series
- Format: 54-hole Stroke play
- Prize fund: €50,000
- Month played: September
- Final year: 2014

Tournament record score
- Aggregate: 215 Emma Westin
- To par: –4 as above

Current champion
- (Sweden) Emma Westin

Location map
- Location in Turkey Location in Europe

The Mineks & Regnum Ladies Classic was a women's professional golf tournament on the LET Access Series, held in Antalya, Turkey.

The inaugural tournament held in November 2013 at National Golf Club in Belek, served as the season finale. The tournament was won by Chloé Leurquin in a playoff and marked the first time the LET Access Series staged an event outside Europe.

In 2014, the event was held in September and sponsored by both the Mineks International and the Regnum Carya Golf Spa Resort. Emma Westin won the event two strokes ahead of compatriot Lina Boqvist.

== Winners ==
Year	Winner	Country	Score	Margin of victory	Runner-up	Purse	Ref
Mineks & Regnum Ladies Classic
2014	Emma Westin	Sweden	−4 (73-71-71=215)	2 strokes	(Sweden) Lina Boqvist	€50,000	
Mineks Ladies Classic
2013	Chloé Leurquin	Belgium	E (76-71-72=219)	Playoff	(Spain) Mireia Prat	€30,000	

== See also ==
- Turkish Ladies Open
