= Cassandra Kirkland =

French professional golfer

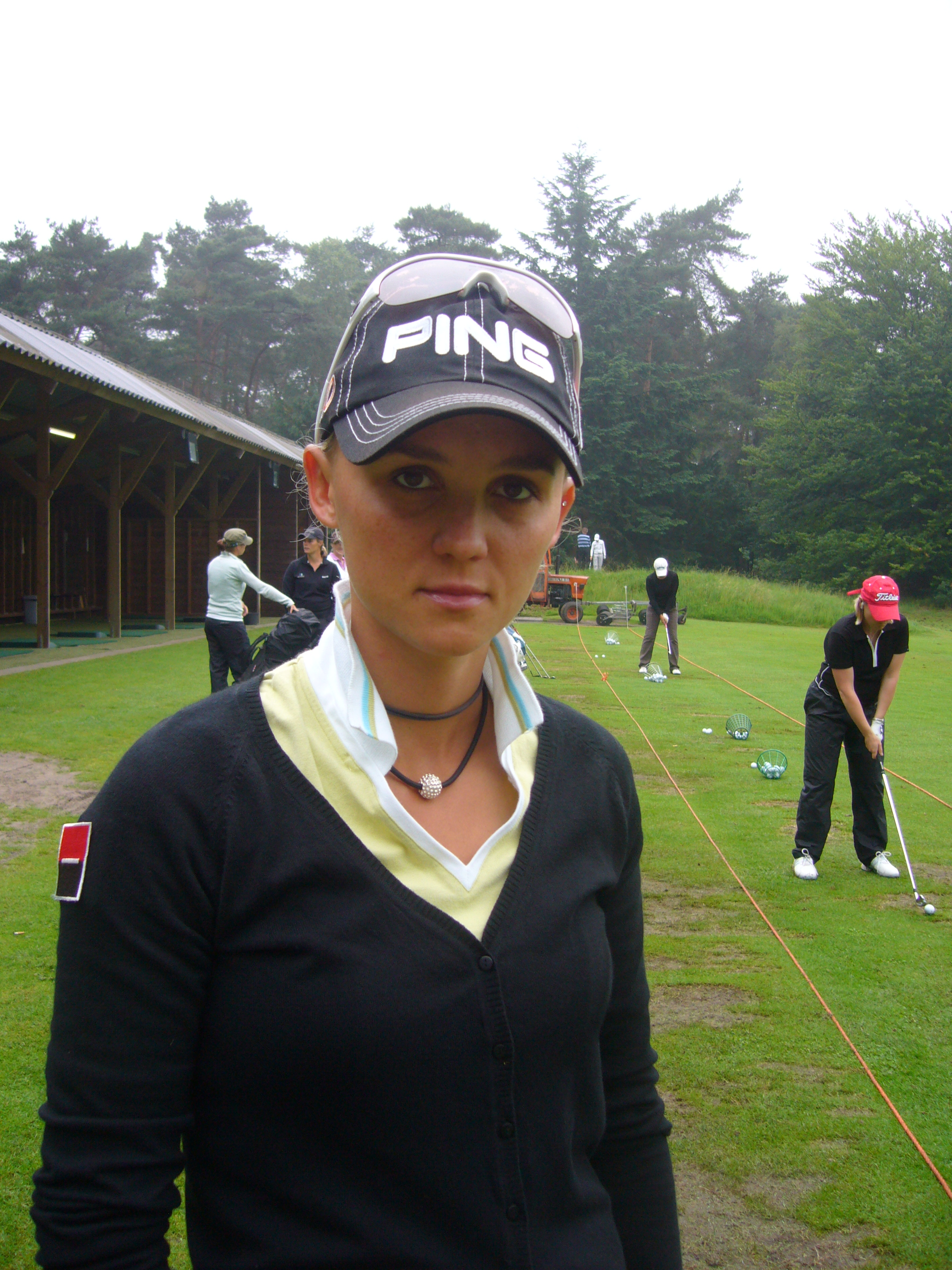
- Cassandra Kirkland in 2008

Personal information
- Nationality: France
- Born: 13 October 1984 Paris, France
- Died: 30 April 2017 (aged 32)
- Height: 173 cm (5 ft 8 in)

Career
- Sport: Golf
- College: University of Arizona
- Turned professional: 2006
- Former tour: Ladies European Tour
- Professional wins: 2

Number of wins by tour
- Ladies European Tour: 1
- Ladies Asian Golf Tour: 1

Cassandra Kirkland (13 October 1984 – 30 April 2017) was a French professional golfer. She played on the Ladies European Tour and won the Sanya Ladies Open in 2012.

== Biography ==
Born in Paris to an American father and French mother, Kirkland studied at the University of Arizona from 2002 to 2006. She was related to American racing car driver Eddie Cheever.

== Amateur career ==
Kirkland played golf from the age of seven and was semi-finalist in the Girls Amateur Championship in 2001. As a member of the Arizona Wildcats women's golfers at University of Arizona, she won the UNLV Invitational and was a member of the NGCA All American Team in 2005. She was All-PAC 10 Team and won the Golfstat award for par-five scoring leader in 2004 and 2005.

== Professional career ==
Kirkland turned professional in 2006 and won twice: the 2012 Sanya Ladies Open in China on the Ladies European Tour and the 2013 Fourqueux Ladies Open near Paris on the LET Access Series.

== Death ==
Kirkland died in 2017 at the age of 32, following a two-year fight against cancer. She was diagnosed with lung cancer in April 2015, despite never having smoked and having led the lifestyle of a healthy, professional athlete.

== Professional wins (2) ==
=== Ladies European Tour (1) ===
No.	Date	Tournament	Winning score	To par	Margin of victory	Runners-up
1	4 Nov 2012	Sanya Ladies Open^{1}	73-67-70=210	−6	2 strokes	(France) Jade Schaeffer (England) Holly Aitchison

^{1}Co-sanctioned by the Ladies Asian Golf Tour.

=== LET Access Series (1) ===
- 2013 Fourqueux Ladies Open

== Team appearances ==
=== Amateur ===
- European Ladies' Team Championship (representing France): 2005
