= 2017 LET Access Series =

Professional women's golf tour

2017 LET Access Series season
- Duration: March 2017 – October 2017
- Number of official events: 13
- Most wins: (France) Valentine Derrey (2)
- Order of Merit winner: (England) Meghan MacLaren

The 2017 LET Access Series was a series of professional women's golf tournaments held from March through October 2017 across Europe. The LET Access Series is the second-tier women's professional golf tour in Europe and is the official developmental tour of the Ladies European Tour.

== Tournament results ==
The table below shows the 2017 schedule. The numbers in brackets after the winners' names show the number of career wins they had on the LET Access Series up to and including that event.

Dates	Tournament	Location	Prize fund (€)	Winner	WWGR points
31 Mar – 2 Apr	Terre Blanche Ladies Open	France	40,000	(France) Valentine Derrey (2)	3
21–23 Apr	Azores Ladies Open	Portugal	35,000	(England) Meghan MacLaren (2)	2
4–6 May	VP Bank Ladies Open	Switzerland	40,000	(Finland) Linda Henriksson (1)	2
24–26 May	Forget Foundation PGA Championship	Sweden	40,000	(France) Valentine Derrey (3)	2
1–3 Jun	Jabra Ladies Open	France	50,000	(France) Isabelle Boineau (1)	4
9–11 Jun	EVLI Ladies Finnish Open	Finland	35,000	(Finland) Ursula Wikström (1)	2
22–24 Jun	Foxconn Czech Ladies Challenge	Czech Republic	40,000	(France) Lucie Andre (1)	2
6–8 Jul	Belfius Ladies Open	Belgium	35,000	(Scotland) Heather MacRae (2)	2
12–14 Jul	Ribeira Sacra Patrimonio de la Humanidad International Ladies Open	Spain	35,000	(England) Emma Goddard (1)	2
2–4 Aug	Castellum Ladies Open	Sweden	35,000	(Spain) Luna Sobrón (2)	2
15–17 Aug	Bossey Ladies Championship	France	45,000	(Scotland) Jane Turner (1)	2
28–30 Sep	WPGA International Challenge	United Kingdom	35,000	(Wales) Lydia Hall (1)	2
25–27 Oct	Santander Golf Tour LETAS El Saler	Spain	35,000	(Sweden) Emma Nilsson (3)	2

== Order of Merit rankings ==
The top five players on the LETAS Order of Merit earned LET membership for the 2018 Ladies European Tour. Players finishing in positions 6–20 get to skip the first stage of the qualifying event and automatically progress to the final stage of the Lalla Aicha Tour School.

Rank	Player	Country	Events	Points	Status earned
1	Meghan MacLaren	England	12	21,985	Promoted to Ladies European Tour
2	Valentine Derrey	France	6	14,968	Promoted to Ladies European Tour
3	Nina Muehl	Austria	13	13,956	Promoted to Ladies European Tour
4	Luna Sobrón Galmés	Spain	8	13,819	Promoted to Ladies European Tour
5	Charlotte Thompson	England	13	13,764	Promoted to Ladies European Tour
6	Manon De Roey	Belgium	13	11,602	
7	Lucie Andre	France	13	11,361	
8	Ines Lescudier	France	13	11,260	
9	Emma Goddard	England	13	10,940	
10	Silvia Banon	Spain	9	10,722	

== See also ==
- 2017 Ladies European Tour
- 2017 in golf
