= Norrporten Ladies Open =

Coordinates: 62.284°N 17.388°E

Tournament information
- Location: Sundsvall, Sweden
- Established: 2011
- Course: Sundsvall Golf Club
- Par: 72
- Tours: Swedish Golf Tour; LET Access Series
- Format: Stroke play
- Prize fund: €35,000
- Month played: August
- Final year: 2018

Tournament record score
- Aggregate: 206 Jenny Haglund
- To par: –10 as above

Final champion
- (Spain) Luna Sobrón

Location map
- Location in Europe

The Norrporten Ladies Open was a women's professional golf tournament on the Swedish Golf Tour and LET Access Series played between 2011 and 2017 in Sundsvall, Sweden.

The tournament was sponsored by Norrporten AB with seat in Sundsvall, and changed its name after the company was acquired by Castellum AB in 2016.

== Winners ==
Year	Tour(s)	Winner	Country	Score	Margin of victory	Runner(s)-up	Purse	Ref
Castellum Ladies Open
2017	SGT · LETAS	Luna Sobrón	Spain	–8 (74-67-67=208)	Playoff	(France) Astrid Vayson de Pradenne	€35,000	
Norrporten Ladies Open
2016	SGT · LETAS	Jenny Haglund	Sweden	–10 (69-69-68=206)	2 strokes	(Austria) Sarah Schober	€40,000	
2015	SGT · LETAS	Olivia Cowan	Germany	–7 (73-69-67=209)	1 stroke	(Finland) Krista Bakker	€35,000	
2014	SGT	Natalie Wille	Sweden	–3 (70-71-72=213)	1 stroke	(Sweden) Johanna Björk (Norway) Cecilie Lundgreen	200,000	
2013	SGT · LETAS	Lauren Taylor	England	–2 (73-72-72=217)	1 stroke	(Netherlands) Chrisje De Vries	€30,000	
2012	SGT	Amanda Sträng	Sweden	–1 (74-69=143)^	2 strokes	(Sweden) Anjelika Hammar (Finland) Linda Henriksson (Australia) Corie Hou	200,000	
2011	SGT	Madeleine Augustsson	Sweden	+2 (67-76-75=218)	1 stroke	(Norway) Cecilie Lundgreen	200,000	

^Shortened to 36 holes due to weather
