= Sarah Schober =

Austrian professional golfer

Personal information
- Nationality: Austria
- Born: 15 April 1992 (age 34) Wagna, Styria, Austria

Career
- Sport: Golf
- College: Redlands Community College; University of Florida
- Turned professional: 2015
- Current tour: Ladies European Tour
- Former tour: LET Access Series
- Professional wins: 1

Best results in LPGA major championships
- Chevron Championship: DNP
- Women's PGA C'ship: DNP
- U.S. Women's Open: CUT: 2018
- Women's British Open: DNP
- Evian Championship: DNP

Achievements and awards
- LETAS Order of Merit: 2016

Sarah Schober (born 15 April 1992) is an Austrian professional golfer and Ladies European Tour player. She was runner-up at the 2022 Big Green Egg Open and won the 2016 LETAS Order of Merit.

== Amateur career ==
Schober was born in Wagna, Austria and began playing golf at the age of eight. At twelve, she joined the National Team. She appeared three times at the Espirito Santo Trophy, and multiple times at the European Ladies' Team Championship, earning a silver medal in 2013 as Austria lost the final to Spain 5 to 2. Schober finished her finals singles match against Camilla Hedberg all square.

Schober attended Redlands Community College in Oklahoma for four semesters, and won the NJCAA Championship back to back in 2012 and 2013. She then played with the Florida Gators women's golf team while attending the University of Florida in Gainesville for two semesters, majoring in telecommunications.

== Professional career ==
Schober turned professional in 2015 and joined the LET Access Series. In 2016, she was runner-up in five tournaments, the Norrporten Ladies Open, EVLI Ladies Finnish Open, Elisefarm Ladies Open, WPGA International Challenge and Santander Golf Tour Zaragoza, securing the LETAS Order of Merit title and earning promotion the Ladies European Tour.

She qualified for her first major, the 2018 U.S. Women's Open, at the European sectional qualifier at Buckinghamshire Golf Club. Schober finished bogey and double bogey and tied for 4th place with Sophie Walker, Heather Macrae, Rachael Goodall, and Christine Wolf. However, she won the playoff on the second hole. She ultimately missed the cut at Shoal Creek Club.

Schober teamed up with Christine Wolf to represent Austria at the 2018 European Golf Team Championships, but the pair did not advance beyond the group stage.

In 2019, she won the Terre Blanche Ladies Open, the LET Access Series season opener in France, in a playoff against Hayley Davis. She finished tied fifth at the 2021 Investec South African Women's Open, four strokes behind winner Lee-Anne Pace.

In 2022, Schober played in the penultimate flight on the final day of the KPMG Women's Irish Open, and finished tied 11th, 4 strokes behind winner Klára Spilková. She made her first cut in an LPGA Tour event at the Trust Golf Women's Scottish Open. She was runner-up at the Big Green Egg Open, a stroke behind Anna Nordqvist. In 2023, she finished tied 7th at the Lalla Meryem Cup, the season opener.

Schober was offered a spot in the 2020 Summer Olympics after South African Paula Reto tested positive for COVID-19 and withdrew. However, the Austrian Olympic Committee declined to make a reallocation for Schober and the 60th and last spot in the field went to India's Diksha Dagar. Having improved her world ranking, Schober sat in 57th spot in the qualification for the 2024 Summer Olympics in April 2023.

== Amateur wins ==
- 2011 Austrian Stroke Play Championship
- 2012 NJCAA Championship
- 2013 NJCAA Championship

== Professional wins (1) ==
=== LET Access Series wins (1) ===
| No. | Date | Tournament | Winning score | To par | Margin of victory | Runner-up |
|---|---|---|---|---|---|---|
| 1 | 7 Apr 2019 | Terre Blanche Ladies Open | 71–70–72=213 | −3 | Playoff | (England) Hayley Davis |

LET Access Series playoff record (1–0)

| No. | Year | Tournament | Opponent | Result |
|---|---|---|---|---|
| 1 | 2019 | Terre Blanche Ladies Open | (United States) Hayley Davis | Won with par on first extra hole |

== Team appearances ==
Amateur

- Espirito Santo Trophy (representing Austria): 2010, 2012, 2014
- European Ladies' Team Championship (representing Austria): 2011, 2013, 2014

Professional

- European Championships (representing Austria): 2018
