= Neuchâtel Ladies Championship =

Tournament information
- Location: Saint-Blaise, Switzerland
- Established: 2019
- Courses: Neuchâtel Golf & Country Club
- Par: 71
- Length: 6,144 yards (5,618 m)
- Tour: LET Access Series
- Format: Stroke play
- Prize fund: €40,000
- Month played: May
- Final year: 2019

Tournament record score
- Aggregate: 215 Greta Isabella Voelker
- To par: +3 as above

Final champion
- (Germany) Greta Isabella Voelker

Location map
- Location in Switzerland

The Neuchâtel Ladies Championship was a golf tournament on the LET Access Series. It was played for the first and only time in May 2019 at Neuchâtel Golf & Country Club in Saint-Blaise, Switzerland.

Greta Isabella Voelker of Germany won the tournament in a play-off against Annelie Sjöholm on the first extra hole.

2020 was severely impacted by the COVID-19 pandemic with many events either being postponed or cancelled, and the tournament never made a return to the schedule.

== Winners ==
Year	Winner	Score	Margin of victory	Runner-up
2019	(Germany) Greta Isabella Voelker	+3 (77-67-72=216)	Playoff	(Sweden) Annelie Sjöholm

== See also ==
- Lavaux Ladies Championship
