= Emma Westin =

Swedish professional golfer (born 1991)

Personal information
- Nationality: Sweden
- Born: 23 July 1991 (age 35) Borås, Sweden

Career
- Sport: Golf
- Turned professional: 2012
- Current tour: LET Access Series
- Former tours: Ladies European Tour (joined 2015); Swedish Golf Tour
- Professional wins: 3

Best results in LPGA major championships
- Chevron Championship: DNP
- Women's PGA C'ship: DNP
- U.S. Women's Open: DNP
- Women's British Open: DNP
- Evian Championship: DNP

Achievements and awards
- LET Access Series Order of Merit: 2014

Emma Westin (born 23 Juli 1991) is a Swedish professional golfer who played on the Ladies European Tour. In 2014 she won the LET Access Series Order of Merit and became the first player to win three LETAS tournaments in a single season, and first to win back to back titles.

== Career ==
Westin grew up in Borås and began playing at the age of seven. She was accepted to the Scandinavian School of Golf at Halmstad University in 2011, and turned pro the following year. She played on the Swedish Golf Tour between 2011 and 2013.

In 2014 Westin joined the LET Access Series where she found immediate success, winning the Sölvesborg Ladies Open in Sweden, the HLR Golf Academy Open in Finland, where she won by a record breaking 11 shots, and the following week claimed her third win at the Mineks & Regnum Ladies Classic in Turkey. With a top-ten finish at the ultimate event of the season, the WPGA International Challenge in England, she secured the number one spot in the 2014 LET Access Series Order of Merit ahead of Lina Boqvist, and graduated to the Ladies European Tour.

== Amateur wins (5) ==
- 2008 Hulta Junior Open
- 2009 Strömstad Junior Open, Skandia Tour Riks #8 - Västergötland
- 2010 Pulsen Open, Gothenburg Open

== Professional wins (3) ==
=== LET Access Series wins (3) ===
No.	Date	Tournament	Winning score	To par	Margin of victory	Runner-up
1	23 May 2014	Sölvesborg Ladies Open^	74-70-70=214	−2	2 strokes	(Switzerland) Melanie Maetzler
2	31 Aug 2014	HLR Golf Academy Open	65-68-69=202	−11	11 strokes	(Scotland) Jane Turner
3	7 Sep 2014	Mineks & Regnum Ladies Classic	73-71-71=215	−4	2 strokes	(Sweden) Lina Boqvist

=== Swedish Golf Tour wins (1) ===
No.	Date	Tournament	Winning score	To par	Margin of victory	Runner-up
1	23 May 2014	Sölvesborg Ladies Open^	74-70-70=214	−2	2 strokes	(Switzerland) Melanie Maetzler
