= Fabienne In-Albon =

Swiss professional golfer

Personal information
- Nationality: Switzerland
- Born: 5 September 1986 (age 40) Zug, Switzerland
- Height: 1.63 m (5 ft 4 in)

Career
- Sport: Golf
- College: Purdue University
- Turned professional: 2012
- Former tours: Ladies European Tour (2014–2017); LET Access Series (joined 2012)
- Professional wins: 1

Fabienne In-Albon (born 5 September 1986) is a Swiss professional golfer who played on the Ladies European Tour from 2014 to 2017. She was runner-up at the 2014 Hero Women's Indian Open

== Career ==
In-Albon played college golf at Purdue University for a year, and then finished her Bachelor Degree in Sport Management in Australia at the International College of Management, Sydney, ICMS.

In-Albon turned professional in 2012 and joined the LET Access Series (LETAS). In 2013, she won the Azores Ladies Open and finished 5th on the Order of Merit to earn her Ladies European Tour card for 2014. In her rookie season, she finished second at the Hero Women's Indian Open and finished 50th on the money list to keep her card.

She played in the 2016 Summer Olympics in Rio de Janeiro where she finished 57th.

== Professional wins (1) ==
=== LET Access Series wins (1) ===
| No. | Date | Tournament | Winning score | To par | Margin of victory | Runner(s)-up |
|---|---|---|---|---|---|---|
| 1 | 6 Oct 2013 | Azores Ladies Open | 72-68-72=212 | −4 | 3 strokes | (Germany) Isi Gabsa (Spain) Mireia Prat |

== Team appearances ==
Amateur

- Espirito Santo Trophy (representing Switzerland): 2004, 2006
- European Ladies' Team Championship (representing Switzerland): 2005
