= 2013 European Ladies' Team Championship =

Golf competition

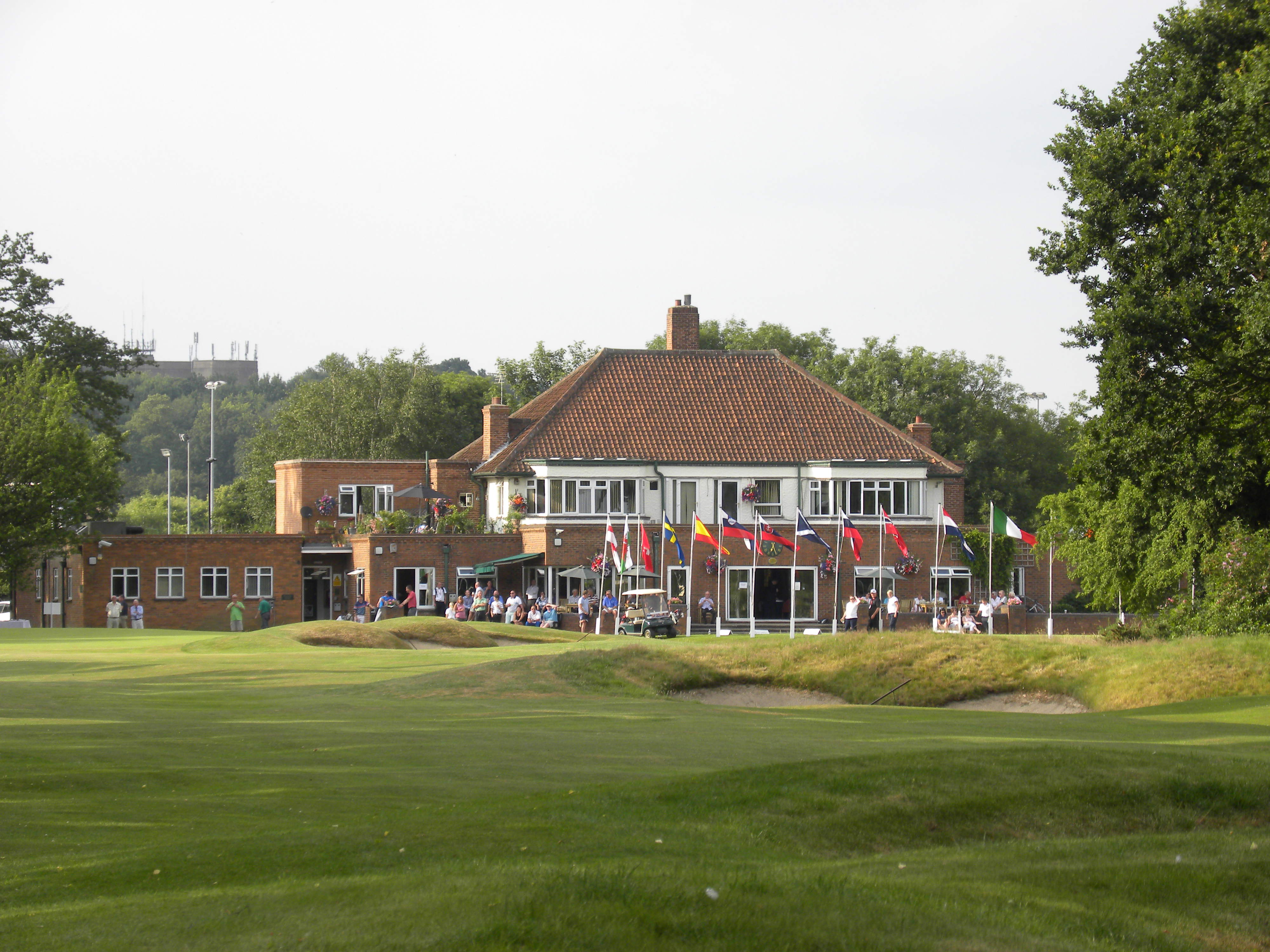
- Fulford Golf Club

Tournament information
- Dates: 9–13 July 2013
- Location: Fulford, North Yorkshire, England, United Kingdom; 53.940°N 1.054°W
- Course: Fulford Golf Club
- Organized by: European Golf Association
- Format: 36 holes stroke play Knock-out match-play

Statistics
- Par: 72
- Field: 19 teams 114 players

Champion
- Spain; Natalia Escuriola, Camilla Hedberg, Noemí Jiménez, Marta Sanz, Patricia Sanz, Luna Sobrón
- Qualification round: 732 (+12); Final match 5–2

Location map
- Location in Europe Location in British Isles Location in England Location in North Yorkshire

The 2013 European Ladies' Team Championship took place 9–13 July at Fulford Golf Club in Fulford, England. It was the 30th women's golf amateur European Ladies' Team Championship.

== Venue ==
The hosting Fulford Golf Club was founded in 1906. The golf course, located 2 kilometers (approximately 1 mile) south of York, North Yorkshire, England, United Kingdom, was designed by Charles MacKenzie, brother of well known golf course architect Alister MacKenzie, and opened in 1935.

Fulford had previously been home to several European Tour events, including the Benson and Hedges International Open between 1971 and 1989. In 1976 the club hosted the inaugural Women's British Open.

The championship course was set up with par 72.

== Format ==
All participating teams played two qualification rounds of stroke-play with six players, counted the five best scores for each team.

The eight best teams formed flight A, in knock-out match-play over the next three days. The teams were seeded based on their positions after the stroke-play. The first placed team was drawn to play the quarter-final against the eight placed team, the second against the seventh, the third against the sixth and the fourth against the fifth. In each match between two nation teams, two 18-hole foursome games and five 18-hole single games were played. Teams were allowed to switch players during the team matches, selecting other players in to the afternoon single games after the morning foursome games. Teams knocked out after the quarter-finals played one foursome game and four single games in each of their remaining matches. Games all square after 18 holes were declared halved, if the team match was already decided.

The eight teams placed 9–16 in the qualification stroke-play formed flight B, to play similar knock-out match-play, with one foursome game and four single games, to decide their final positions.

The three teams placed 17–19 in the qualification stroke-play formed flight C, to meet each other, with one foursome game and four single games, to decide their final positions.

== Teams ==
19 nation teams contested the event. Each team consisted of six players. Slovakia took part for the first time.

Players in the teams

Country	Players
Austria	Marlies Krenn, Nadine Dreher, Nina Mühl, Anja Purgauer, Sarah Schober, Fanny Wolte
Belgium	Joëlle van Baarle, Leslie Cloots, Fanny Cnops, Laura Gonzalez Escallon, Manon De Roey, Margaux Vanmol
Denmark	Nicole Broch Larsen, Malene Krølbøll, Nanna Koerstz Madsen, Daisy Nielsen, Caroline Nistrup, Emily Kristine Pedersen
England	Sarah-Jane Boyd, Hayley Davis, Georgia Hall, Bronte Law, Meghan MacLaren, Lauren Taylor
Finland	Krista Bakker, Anne Hakula, Sanna Nuutinen, Annika Nykänen, Oona Vartiainen, Marika Voss
France	Alexandra Bonetti, Céline Boutier, Justine Dreher, Manot Gidali, Ines Lescudier, Ariane Provot
Germany	Pia Halbig, Thea Hoffmeister, Lara Katzy, Stephanie Kirchmaier, Sophia Popov, Valerie Sternebeck
Iceland	Signy Arnolsdóttir, Gudrun Bjorgvinsdóttir, Ólafía Kristinsdóttir, Ragnhildur Kristinsdóttir, Anna Snorradottir, Sunna Vidisdóttir
Ireland	Maria Dunne, Paula Grant, Leona Maguire, Lisa Maguire, Stephanie Meadow, Chloe Ryan
Italy	Stefania Avonzo, Barbara Borin, Alessandra Braida, Bianca Maria Fabrizio, Laura Lonardi, Carlotta Ricolfi
Netherlands	Elise Boehmer, Myrte Eikenaar, Ileen Domela Nieuwenhuis, Charlotte Puts, Martien Schipper, Dewi Weber
Norway	Mariell Bruun, Tonje Daffinrud, Julie Lied, Anette Lyche, Nicoline Skaug, Marthe Wold
Scotland	Eilidh Briggs, Gemma Dryburgh, Alyson McKechin, Jessica Meek, Ailsa Summers, Rachel Watton
Slovakia	Aneta Abrahamova, Zuzana Bielikova, Karolina Cordieri, Katka Chovankova, Natalia Heckova, Lina Sekerkova
Slovenia	Ana Belac, Ema Grilc, Ursa Orehec, Katja Pogačar, Tajda Sarjanj, Taša Torbica
Spain	Natalia Escuriola, Camilla Hedberg, Noemí Jiménez, Marta Sanz, Patricia Sanz, Luna Sobrón
Sweden	Frida Gustafsson Spång, Emma Henriksson, Josephine Janson, Linnea Johansson, Madelene Sagström, Johanna Tillström
Switzerland	Natalie Karcher, Valeria Martinoli, Linda Roos, Rachel Rossel, Tamara Scheidegger, Nina von Siebenthal,
Wales	Amy Boulden, Sam Birks, Gemma Bradbury, Becky Harries, Kath O'Connor, Chloe Williams

== Winners ==
Team Denmark lead the opening 36-hole qualifying competition, with a score of 19 under par 701, 31 strokes ahead of the team on second place, team Spain. Between all the next ten teams, the difference was 25 strokes.

Individual leaders in the 36-hole stroke-play competition was Madelene Sagström, Sweden and Oona Vartiainen, Finland, each with a score of 8 under par 136, two strokes ahead of nearest competitors.

Team Spain won the championship, beating Austria 5–2 in the final and earned their fifth title.

Team Finland, earned third place, beating host nation England 4–3 in the bronze match. Finland, as well as Austria, was at the podium for the first time in the history of the championship.

== Results ==
Qualification round

Team standings

Place	Country	Score	To par
1	Denmark	349-352=701	−19
2	Spain	354-378=732	+12
3	Netherlands	363-376=739	+19
T4	Sweden *	365-375=740	+20
T4	Finland	367-373=740	+20
T6	England *	364-377=741	+21
T6	France	371-370=741	+21
8	Austria	377-372=749	+29
9	Ireland	371-379=750	+30
10	Scotland	374-380=754	+34
T11	Belgium *	374-383=757	+37
T11	Wales	376-381=757	+37
13	Germany	384-378=762	+42
14	Italy	388-378=766	+46
15	Norway	386-390=776	+56
16	Slovenia	390.387=777	+57
17	Iceland	383-396=779	+59
18	Slovakia	394-400=794	+74
19	Switzerland	404-393=797	+77

* Note: In the event of a tie the order was determined by the better total non-counting scores.

Individual leaders

Place	Player	Country	Score	To par
T1	Madelene Sagström	Sweden	67-69=136	−8
T1	Oona Vartiainen	Finland	69-67=136	−8
T3	Stephanie Meadow	Ireland	70-68=138	−6
T3	Daisy Nielsen	Denmark	68-70=138	−6
T5	Nanna Koerstz Madsen	Denmark	69-70=139	−5
T5	Emily Kristine Pedersen	Denmark	66-73=139	−5
T7	Nicole Broch Larsen	Denmark	70-70=140	−4
T7	Sophia Popov	Germany	69-71=140	−4
9	Dewi Weber	Netherlands	71-71=142	−2
T10	Céline Boutier	France	69-74=143	−1
T10	Bronte Law	England	69-74=143	−1

Note: There was no official award for the lowest individual score.

Flight A

Bracket

Quarter finals
Austria	4
Denmark	3
Finland	4
Sweden	3
England	4
Netherlands	3
Spain	5.5
France	1.5

Semi finals
Austria	5.5
Finland	1.5
Spain	4.5
England	2.5

Final
Spain	5
Austria	2
Bronze match
Finland	4
England	3

Elimination matches
Denmark	3
Sweden	2
France	4
Netherlands	1

Match for 5th place
Denmark	4
France	1
Match for 7th place
Netherlands	3
Sweden	2

Final games

Spain	Austria
5	2
N. Jiménez / C. Hedberg 1 hole	A. Purgauer / N. Muehl
N. Escuriola / Marta Sanz 5 & 4	S. Schober / M. Krenn
Noemí Jiménez 19th hole	Nadine Drehe
Luna Sobron	Fanny Wolte 2 holes
Patricia Sanz 2 & 1	Nina Muehl
Camilla Hedberg AS *	Sarah Schober AS *
Natalia Escuriola AS *	Anja Purgauer AS *

* Note: Game declared halved, since team match already decided.

Flight B

Bracket

Round 1
Ireland	4.5
Slovenia	0.5
Germany	3
Wales	2
Belgium	3.5
Italy	1.5
Scotland	3
Norway	2

Round 2
Germany	4
Ireland	1
Belgium	3
Scotland	2

Match for 9th place
Germany	3.5
Belgium	1.5
Match for 11th place
Ireland	3
Scotland	2

Elimination matches
Wales	4.5
Slovenia	0.5
Italy	3.5
Norway	1.5

Match for 13th place
Wales	3
Italy	2
Match for 15th place
Slovenia	4
Norway	1

Flight C

Team standings

Country	Place	W	T	L	Game points	Points
Iceland	17	2	0	0	7.5–2.5	2
Switzerland	18	1	0	1	4–6	1
Slovakia	19	0	0	2	3.5–6.5	0

Final standings

Place	Country
1st place, gold medalist(s)	Spain
2nd place, silver medalist(s)	Austria
3rd place, bronze medalist(s)	Finland
4	England
5	Denmark
6	France
7	Netherlands
8	Sweden
9	Germany
10	Belgium
11	Ireland
12	Scotland
13	Wales
14	Italy
15	Slovenia
16	Norway
17	Iceland
18	Switzerland
19	Slovakia

== See also ==
- Espirito Santo Trophy – biennial world amateur team golf championship for women organized by the International Golf Federation.
- European Amateur Team Championship – European amateur team golf championship for men organised by the European Golf Association.
- European Ladies Amateur Championship – European amateur individual golf championship for women organised by the European Golf Association.
