= Azores Ladies Open =

Professional golf tournament

Tournament information
- Location: Azores, Portugal
- Established: 2011
- Courses: Golf de Batalha; Golfe da Ilha Terceira; Furnas Golf Club
- Par: 72
- Tour: LET Access Series
- Format: 54-hole Stroke play
- Prize fund: €30,000
- Month played: October
- Final year: 2017

Tournament record score
- Aggregate: 211 Jenny Haglund
- To par: –5 as above

Final champion
- (England) Meghan MacLaren

The Azores Ladies Open was a women's professional golf tournament on the LET Access Series, held between 2011 and 2017 in the Azores, an Autonomous Region of Portugal.

The tournament was the first LET Access Series event to be staged in Portugal. Sponsored by the Azores Tourist Board, it was held three times at Campo de Golf de Batalha in Ponta Delgada on São Miguel Island, home to the Azores Senior Open, and three times on Terceira Island.

== Winners ==
Year	Venue	Winner	Country	Score	Margin of victory	Runner(s)-up	Ref
2017	Golfe da Ilha Terceira	Meghan MacLaren	England	−2 (70-70-74=214)	2 strokes	(France) Eva Gilly (Wales) Chloe Williams	
2016	Golf de Batalha	Jenny Haglund	Sweden	−5 (76-71-64=211)	5 strokes	(France) Joyce Chong (France) Astrid Vayson de Pradenne (Hungary) Csilla Lajtai-Rozsa	
2015	Golfe da Ilha Terceira	Karolin Lampert	Germany	−2 (71-70-73=214)	2 strokes	(Finland) Krista Bakker	
2014	Golf de Batalha	Tonje Daffinrud	Norway	−4 (71-68-73=212)	3 strokes	(Croatia) Daniela Prorokova	
2013	Golfe da Ilha Terceira	Fabienne In-Albon	Switzerland	−4 (72-68-72=212)	3 strokes	(Germany) Isi Gabsa (Spain) Mireia Prat	
2012	Furnas Golf Club	Anna Rossi	Italy	+3 (73-74=147)	2 strokes	(Scotland) Pamela Pretswell Asher	
2011	Golf de Batalha	Marieke Nivard	Netherlands	E (75-72-69=216)	1 stroke	(England) Kelly Tidy (a)	
