= Annelie Sjöholm =

Swedish professional golfer

Personal information
- Nickname: Annie
- Nationality: Sweden
- Born: 7 September 1995 (age 31) Västerås, Sweden
- Height: 5 ft 8 in (1.73 m)

Career
- Sport: Golf
- College: Campbell University
- Turned professional: 2018
- Former tours: Ladies European Tour (joined 2020); LET Access Series (joined 2018); Swedish Golf Tour (joined 2018)
- Professional wins: 2

Achievements and awards
- Big South Conference Golfer of the Year: 2017, 2018

Annelie Sjöholm (born 7 September 1995) is a retired Swedish professional golfer who briefly played on the Ladies European Tour.

== Career ==
Sjöholm began playing handball and football when she was seven years old, and golf when she was eight. When she was 13, she dropped all other sports to focus exclusively on golf. She won nine junior tournaments between 2009 and 2015, and attributes her success to her aspiration to beat her twin brother Tobias, with whom she toured Sweden competing on the junior circuit.

Sjöholm played college golf at Campbell University in Buies Creek, North Carolina, between 2014 and 2018. She was runner-up in her college debut at the LPGA Xavier Invitational behind Tiffany Chan. In 2016, she helped lead the Campbell Lady Camels golf team to the conference title and was runner-up in the Big South Championship. Her first collegiate win came at the 2017 Amelia Island Collegiate, where she shot a 61 in the second round. Leading the conference in stroke average, she was named Big South Conference Golfer of the Year in 2017 and again in 2018.

Directly following her college graduation, Sjöholm turned professional in June 2018 and started playing on the LET Access Series and the Swedish Golf Tour, where she won her maiden professional title at the Slite Open in August. 2019 was her rookie year on the Ladies European Tour, but with limited status she played in only three LET tournaments with a best finish of T25 in the South African Women's Open.

On the LET Access Series, Sjöholm lost a playoff at the Neuchâtel Ladies Championship in Switzerland in May, but triumphed in the Anna Nordqvist Västerås Open at her home course in August, beating Maja Stark by one stroke.

== Amateur wins ==
- 2009 Skandia Tour Regional #3 - Västmanland, Skandia Tour Regional #5 - Västmanland
- 2010 Skandia Tour Regional #3 - Småland, Skandia Tour Regional #5 - Västmanland
- 2011 Vassunda Junior Open, Skandia Tour Regional #4 - Östergötland
- 2012 Gullbringa Junior Open
- 2013 Skandia Tour Riks #5 Västmanland, Junior Masters Invitational
- 2015 Skandia Tour Riks #2 Småland, McDonald's Juniorpokal
- 2017 Amelia Island Collegiate

== Professional wins (2) ==
=== LET Access Series (1) ===
No.	Date	Tournament	Winning score	To par	Margin of victory	Runner-up	Ref
1	10 Aug 2019	Anna Nordqvist Västerås Open^	70-72-68=210	−6	1 stroke	(Sweden) Maja Stark	

^Co-sanctioned with the Swedish Golf Tour

LET Access Series playoff record (0–1)

No.	Year	Tournament	Opponent	Result
1	2019	Neuchâtel Ladies Championship	(Germany) Greta Isabella Voelker	Lost to par on the first extra hole

=== Swedish Golf Tour (2) ===
No.	Date	Tournament	Winning score	To par	Margin of victory	Runner-up
1	17 Aug 2018	Slite Open	69-69-71=209	−7	1 stroke	(Sweden) Mimmi Bergman
2	10 Aug 2019	Anna Nordqvist Västerås Open^	70-72-68=210	−6	1 stroke	(Sweden) Maja Stark

^Co-sanctioned with the LET Access Series
