= 2018 LET Access Series =

Professional women's golf tour

2018 LET Access Series season
- Duration: April 2018 – November 2018
- Number of official events: 13
- Most wins: 2: (Sweden) Julia Engström
- Order of Merit: (Sweden) Emma Nilsson

The 2018 LET Access Series was a series of women's professional golf tournaments held from April through November 2018 across Europe. The LET Access Series is the second-tier women's professional golf tour in Europe and is the official developmental tour of the Ladies European Tour.

The Jabra Ladies Open, held at the Evian Resort Golf Club in France and since 2014 the European qualifying competition for the Evian Championship, became the tour's first dual-ranking event with the LET.

The Order of Merit was won by Emma Nilsson, who in the process also became the first player to secure 4 career titles on the tour.

== Tournament results ==
The table below shows the 2018 schedule. The numbers in brackets after the winners' names show the number of career wins they had on the LET Access Series up to and including that event.

Dates	Tournament	Location	Prize fund (€)	Winner	Notes
6–8 Apr	Terre Blanche Ladies Open	France	40,000	(Norway) Marita Engzelius (1)	
4–6 May	VP Bank Ladies Open	Switzerland	40,000	(Spain) Noemí Jiménez (1)	
31 May – 2 Jun	Jabra Ladies Open	France	120,000	(France) Astrid Vayson de Pradenne (1)	Dual-ranking event with the Ladies European Tour
7–9 Jun	Viaplay Ladies Finnish Open	Finland	40,000	(Sweden) Julia Engström (1)	
14–16 Jun	AXA Czech Ladies Challenge	Czech Republic	35,000	(Spain) Carmen Alonso (1)	
20–22 Jun	Lavaux Ladies Championship	Switzerland	50,000	(Belgium) Fanny Cnops (1)	
28–30 Jun	Belfius Ladies Open	Belgium	40,000	(Sweden) Emma Nilsson (4)	
4–6 Jul	Ribeira Sacra Patrimonio de la Humanidad International Ladies Open	Spain	35,000	(Sweden) Johanna Gustavsson (2)	
9–11 Aug	Anna Nordqvist Västerås Open	Sweden	35,000	(France) Emie Peronnin (1)	
15–17 Aug	Bossey Ladies Championship	France	50,000	(Spain) Elia Folch (1)	
30 Aug – 1 Sep	Turfman Allerum Open	Sweden	35,000	(England) Rachael Goodall (1)	
13–15 Sep	WPGA International Challenge	United Kingdom	35,000	(Belgium) Manon De Roey (1)	
8–10 Nov	Santander Golf Tour LETAS El Prat	Spain	35,000	(Sweden) Julia Engström (2)	

== Order of Merit rankings ==
The top five players on the LETAS Order of Merit earn LET membership for the Ladies European Tour. Players finishing in positions 6–20 get to skip the first stage of the qualifying event and automatically progress to the final stage of the Lalla Aicha Tour School.

Rank	Player	Country	Events	Points
1	Emma Nilsson	Sweden	11	22,492
2	Noemí Jiménez	Spain	10	19,947
3	Elia Folch	Spain	12	18,387
4	Astrid Vayson de Pradenne	France	8	17,123
5	Cloe Frankish	England	13	14,677
6	Sanna Nuutinen	Finland	12	13,568
7	Emie Peronnin	France	13	12,665
8	Manon De Roey	Belgium	11	12,554
9	Fanny Cnops	Belgium	12	12,120
10	Laura Fuenfstueck	Germany	12	11,599

Earned membership for the 2019 Ladies European Tour.

== See also ==
- 2018 Ladies European Tour
- 2018 in golf
