= Chloé Leurquin =

Belgian professional golfer

Personal information
- Nationality: Belgium
- Born: 9 August 1990 (age 36) Rio de Janeiro, Brazil
- Height: 1.69 m (5 ft 7 in)

Career
- Sport: Golf
- Turned professional: 2013
- Former tours: Ladies European Tour (2014–2019); LET Access Series (joined 2013)
- Professional wins: 1

Best results in LPGA major championships
- Chevron Championship: DNP
- Women's PGA C'ship: DNP
- U.S. Women's Open: DNP
- Women's British Open: T70: 2016
- Evian Championship: DNP

Chloé Leurquin (born 9 August 1990) is a Belgian professional golfer from Waterloo, Belgium. She played on the Ladies European Tour from 2014 to 2019.

== Career ==
Leurquin turned professional in 2013 and joined the LET Access Series, where she won the Mineks Ladies Classic in Turkey to finish 4th in the Order of Merit and earn membership of the Ladies European Tour (LET) in 2014.

In her rookie season on the LET, Leurquin shared the lead ahead of the final round of the Xiamen Open International with Ssu-Chia Cheng, ultimately tying for 11th.

Leurquin played on the Ladies European Tour from 2014 to 2019. Her best finish was an 8th place in the 2016 Lalla Meryem Cup at Royal Golf Dar Es Salam.

Leurquin represented Belgium at the 2016 Summer Olympics in Rio de Janeiro, where she finished 56th. She earned a spot at the 2016 Women's British Open at Woburn Golf and Country Club through being in the top-25 on the LET money list, and made the cut. She was sponsored by Ricoh.

== Amateur wins ==
- 2012 King's Prize, Belgian Stroke Play
- 2013 Italian Ladies Amateur

== Professional wins (1) ==
=== LET Access Series (1) ===
No.	Date	Tournament	Winning score	To par	Margin of victory	Runner-up
1	30 Nov 2013	Mineks Ladies Classic	76-71-72=219	E	Playoff	(Spain) Mireia Prat

LET Access Series playoff record (1–0)

No.	Year	Tournament	Opponent	Result
1	2013	Mineks Ladies Classic	(Spain) Mireia Prat	Won with birdie on the first extra hole

== Team appearances ==
Amateur

- European Girls' Team Championship (representing Belgium): 2007
- European Ladies' Team Championship (representing Belgium): 2008, 2009, 2010, 2011
- Espirito Santo Trophy (representing Belgium): 2008, 2010, 2012

Professional

- European Championships (representing Belgium): 2018
