= 2013 LET Access Series =

Professional women's golf tour

2014 LET Access Series season
- Duration: March 2013 – November 2013
- Number of official events: 15
- Most wins: 2 (tie): (Denmark) Nicole Broch Larsen (Spain) Mireia Prat
- Order of Merit winner: (Spain) Mireia Prat

The 2013 LET Access Series was a series of professional women's golf tournaments held from March through November 2013 across Europe. The LET Access Series is the second-tier women's professional golf tour in Europe and is the official developmental tour of the Ladies European Tour.

== Tournament results ==
The table below shows the 2013 schedule. The numbers in brackets after the winners' names show the number of career wins they had on the LET Access Series up to and including that event.

Dates	Tournament	Location	Prize fund (€)	Winner	WWGR points
21–23 Mar	Terre Blanche Ladies Open	France	25,000	(France) Sophie Giquel-Bettan (1)	2
5–7 Apr	Dinard Ladies Open	France	25,000	(Denmark) Monica Christianse (1)	2
1–3 May	Ocho Golf Ladies Open – Galicia	Spain	35,000	(Spain) Mireia Prat (1)	2
16–18 May	Kristianstad Åhus Ladies PGA Open	Sweden	30,000	(Sweden) Linn Andersson (1)	2
22–24 May	Sölvesborg Ladies Open	Sweden	30,000	(Scotland) Heather MacRae (1)	2
6–8 Jun	Fourqueux Ladies Open	France	25,000	(France) Cassandra Kirkland (1)	2
25–27 Jul	Ingarö Ladies Open	Sweden	30,000	(Scotland) Pamela Feggans (1)	2
9–11 Aug	HLR Golf Academy Open	Finland	40,000	(Denmark) Nicole Broch Larsen (1)	2
30 Aug –1 Sep	Norrporten Ladies Open	Sweden	30,000	(England) Lauren Taylor (am) (1)	2
18–20 Sep	Ladies Norwegian Challenge	Norway	30,000	(Denmark) Nicole Broch Larsen (2)	2
26–28 Sep	WPGA International Challenge	United Kingdom	25,000	(England) Hannah Ralph (1)	2
4–6 Oct	Azores Ladies Open	Portugal	25,000	(Switzerland) Fabienne In-Albon (1)	2
24–26 Oct	Grecotel Amirandes Ladies Open	Greece	27,500	(Spain) Patricia Sanz Barrio (1)	2
18–20 Nov	Costa Blanca Ladies Open	Spain	25,000	(Spain) Mireia Prat (2)	2
28–30 Nov	Mineks Ladies Classic	Turkey	30,000	(Belgium) Chloe Leurquin (1)	2

== Order of Merit rankings ==
The top five players on the LETAS Order of Merit earned LET membership for the Ladies European Tour. Players finishing in positions 6–20 get to skip the first stage of the qualifying event and automatically progress to the final stage of the Lalla Aicha Tour School.

Rank	Player	Country	Events	Points	Status earned
1	Mireia Prat	Spain	15	34,314	Promoted to Ladies European Tour
2	Patricia Sanz Barrio	Spain	12	23,786	Promoted to Ladies European Tour
3	Nicole Broch Larsen	Denmark	10	17,724	Promoted to Ladies European Tour
4	Chloe Leurquin	Belgium	14	17,495	Promoted to Ladies European Tour
5	Fabienne In-Albon	Switzerland	13	14,106	Promoted to Ladies European Tour
6	Heather MacRae	Scotland	14	14,065	
7	Steffi Kirchmayr	Germany	14	13,638	
8	Caroline Martens	Norway	14	13,433	
9	Chrisje de Vries	Netherlands	14	13,378	
10	Pamela Feggans	Scotland	14	11,930	

== See also ==
- 2013 Ladies European Tour
- 2013 in golf
