= 2014 LET Access Series =

Professional women's golf tour

2014 LET Access Series season
- Duration: May 2014 – October 2014
- Number of official events: 16
- Most wins: (Sweden) Emma Westin (3)
- Order of Merit winner: (Sweden) Emma Westin

The 2014 LET Access Series was a series of professional women's golf tournaments held from May through October 2014 across Europe. The LET Access Series is the second-tier women's professional golf tour in Europe and is the official developmental tour of the Ladies European Tour.

== Tournament results ==
The table below shows the 2014 schedule. The numbers in brackets after the winners' names show the number of career wins they had on the LET Access Series up to and including that event.

Dates	Tournament	Location	Prize fund (€)	Winner	WWGR points
2–4 May	Association Suisse de Golf Ladies Open	Switzerland	30,000	(Wales) Amy Boulden (1)	2
15–17 May	Kristianstad Åhus Ladies PGA Open	Sweden	30,000	(Sweden) Isabella Ramsay (1)	2
21–23 May	Sölvesborg Ladies Open	Sweden	30,000	(Sweden) Emma Westin (1)	2
29–31 May	OCA Augas Santas International Ladies Open	Spain	35,000	(Philippines) Mia Piccio (1)	2
13–15 Jun	Open Generali de Dinard	France	30,000	(France) Valentine Derrey (1)	2
9–11 Jul	Pilsen Golf Challenge	Czech Republic	30,000	(Sweden) Emma Nilsson (1)	2
17–19 Jul	Royal Belgian Golf Federation LETAS Trophy	Belgium	30,000	(Sweden) Isabella Ramsay (2)	2
7–9 Aug	Ingarö Ladies Open	Sweden	30,000	(Spain) Marta Sanz Barrio (1)	2
12–14 Aug	Ladies Norwegian Challenge	Norway	30,000	(Sweden) Emma Nilsson (2)	2
21–23 Aug	Onsjö Ladies Open	Sweden	30,000	(Sweden) Lina Boqvist (1)	2
29–31 Aug	HLR Golf Academy Open	Finland	50,000	(Sweden) Emma Westin (2)	2
5–7 Sep	Mineks & Regnum Ladies Classic	Turkey	50,000	(Sweden) Emma Westin (3)	2
25–27 Sep	Open Generali de Strasbourg	France	30,000	(England) Georgia Hall (1)	2
3–5 Oct	Azores Ladies Open	Portugal	30,000	(Norway) Tonje Daffinrud (1)	2
10–12 Oct	Grecotel Amirandes Ladies Open	Greece	30,000	(Norway) Tonje Daffinrud (2)	2
16–18 Oct	WPGA International Challenge	United Kingdom	30,000	(Denmark) Daisy Nielsen (1)	2

== Order of Merit rankings ==
The top five players on the LETAS Order of Merit earn LET membership for the Ladies European Tour. Players finishing in positions 6–20 get to skip the first stage of the qualifying event and automatically progress to the final stage of the Lalla Aicha Tour School.

Rank	Player	Country	Events	Points	Status earned
1	Emma Westin	Sweden	12	29,368	Promoted to Ladies European Tour
2	Lina Boqvist	Sweden	15	27,419	Promoted to Ladies European Tour
3	Daisy Nielsen	Denmark	15	26,999	Promoted to Ladies European Tour
4	Isabella Ramsay	Sweden	14	24,959	Promoted to Ladies European Tour
5	Tonje Daffinrud	Norway	8	20,135	Promoted to Ladies European Tour
6	Caroline Rominger	Switzerland	15	19,145	
7	Vittoria Valvassori	Italy	16	18,283	
8	Melanie Maetzler	Switzerland	16	17,798	
9	Maria Beautell	Spain	15	16,210	
10	Emma Nilsson	Sweden	14	16,142	

== See also ==
- 2014 Ladies European Tour
- 2014 in golf
