= 2019 LET Access Series =

Professional women's golf tour

2019 LET Access Series season
- Duration: April 2019 – October 2019
- Number of official events: 20
- Most wins: 2: (Belgium) Manon De Roey
- Order of Merit: (England) Hayley Davis

The 2019 LET Access Series was a series of professional women's golf tournaments held from April through October 2019 across Europe. The LET Access Series is the second-tier women's professional golf tour in Europe and is the official developmental tour of the Ladies European Tour.

== Tournament results ==
The table below shows the 2019 schedule. The numbers in brackets after the winners' names show the number of career wins they had on the LET Access Series up to and including that event.

Dates	Tournament	Location	Prize fund (€)	Winner	Notes
5–7 Apr	Terre Blanche Ladies Open	France	40,000	(Austria) Sarah Schober (1)	
3–5 May	VP Bank Ladies Open	Switzerland	45,000	(Switzerland) Elena Moosmann (a) (1)	
15–17 May	Neuchatel Ladies Championship	Switzerland	40,000	(Germany) Greta Isabella Voelker (1)	
23–25 May	Jabra Ladies Open	France	150,000	(England) Annabel Dimmock (1)	Dual-ranking event with the Ladies European Tour
29–31 May	Lavaux Ladies Championship	Switzerland	50,000	(Spain) Maria Beautell (1)	
6–8 Jun	Viaplay Ladies Finnish Open	Finland	40,000	(Russia) Nina Pegova (1)	
13–15 Jun	Skaftö Open	Sweden	50,000	(Germany) Esther Henseleit (1)	
20–22 Jun	Montauban Ladies Open	France	40,000	(Spain) Laura Gomez Ruiz (1)	
27–29 Jun	Belfius Ladies Open	Belgium	40,000	(France) Emma Grechi (1)	
4–7 Jul	Saint-Malo Golf Mixed Open	France	45,000	(Belgium) Manon De Roey (n/c) (Note: Finished tied for third overall; for Order of Merit and World Ranking, she is credited with first-place points as it is based among the women only.) low woman	Co-sanctioned by the Alps Tour
11–13 Jul	Ribeira Sacra Patrimonio de la Humanidad International Ladies Open	Spain	35,000	(England) Rachael Goodall (2)	
17–19 Jul	Santander Golf Tour LETAS Valencia	Spain	35,000	(Belgium) Manon De Roey (2)	
1–3 Aug	Amundi Czech Ladies Challenge	Czech Republic	35,000	(Finland) Sanna Nuutinen (2)	
8–10 Aug	Anna Nordqvist Västerås Open	Sweden	35,000	(Sweden) Annelie Sjöholm (1)	
14–16 Aug	Bossey Ladies Championship	France	35,000	(England) Hayley Davis (1)	
23–25 Aug	Tipsport Czech Ladies Open	Czech Republic	120,000	(Scotland) Carly Booth (3)	Dual-ranking event with the Ladies European Tour
29–31 Aug	Scandic PGA Championship	Sweden	42,000	(Norway) Tonje Daffinrud (3)	
12–14 Sep	WPGA International Challenge	United Kingdom	35,000	(Belgium) Manon De Roey (3)	
26–28 Sep	Rügenwalder Mühle Ladies Open	Germany	40,000	(Scotland) Laura Murray (2)	
4–6 Oct	Road To La Largue Final	France	80,000	(Finland) Niina Liias (1)	

== Order of Merit rankings ==
The top five players on the LETAS Order of Merit earn LET membership for the Ladies European Tour. Players finishing in positions 6–20 get to skip the first stage of the qualifying event and automatically progress to the final stage of the Lalla Aicha Tour School.

Rank	Player	Country	Events	Points
1	Hayley Davis	England	15	29,576
2	Sanna Nuutinen	Finland	16	25,909
3	Lucrezia Colombotto Rosso	Italy	15	22,571
4	Laura Murray	Scotland	19	20,298
5	Laura Gomez Ruiz	Spain	18	20,104
6	Chloe Williams	Wales	19	19,422
7	Manon De Roey	Belgium	9	18,416
8	Caroline Rominger	Switzerland	16	17,764
9	Nina Pegova	Russia	15	17,610
10	Annelie Sjöholm	Sweden	17	16,942

Earned membership for the 2020 Ladies European Tour.

== See also ==
- 2019 Ladies European Tour
- 2019 in golf
