= 2011 European Ladies' Team Championship =

Golf competition

Tournament information
- Dates: 5–9 July 2011
- Location: Frohnleiten, Austria; 47.230°N 15.324°E
- Course: Golfclub Murhof
- Organized by: European Golf Association
- Format: 36 holes stroke play Knock-out match-play

Statistics
- Par: 72
- Field: 20 teams 120 players

Champion
- Sweden; Daniela Holmqvist, Josephine Janson, Nathalie Månsson, Madelene Sagström, Amanda Sträng, Johanna Tillström
- Qualification round: 724 (+4); Final match 5–2

Location map
- Location in Europe Location in Austria Location in Styria

The 2011 European Ladies' Team Championship took place 5–9 July at Golf Club Murhof in Frohnleiten, Austria. It was the 29th women's golf amateur European Ladies' Team Championship.

== Venue ==
The club was founded in 1963 and its course, located 15 kilometers north of Graz in Styria, Austria, was constructed by Dr. Bernhard von Limburger.

The championship course was set up with par 72.

== Format ==
All participating teams played two qualification rounds of stroke-play with six players, counted the five best scores for each team.

The eight best teams formed flight A, in knock-out match-play over the next three days. The teams were seeded based on their positions after the stroke-play. The first placed team was drawn to play the quarter final against the eight placed team, the second against the seventh, the third against the sixth and the fourth against the fifth. In each match between two nation teams, two 18-hole foursome games and five 18-hole single games were played. Teams were allowed to switch players during the team matches, selecting other players in to the afternoon single games after the morning foursome games. Teams knocked out after the quarter finals played one foursome game and four single games in each of their remaining matches. Games all square after 18 holes were declared halved, if the team match was already decided.

The eight teams placed 9–16 in the qualification stroke-play formed flight B, to play similar knock-out match-play, with one foursome game and four single games, to decide their final positions.

The four teams placed 17–20 in the qualification stroke-play formed flight C, to meet each other, with one foursome game and four single games, to decide their final positions.

== Teams ==
A record number of 20 nation teams contested the event. Each team consisted of six players. Russia took part for the first time.

Players in the teams

Country	Players
Austria	Marina Kotnik, Marlies Krenn, Nina Mühl, Sarah Schober, Marina Stütz, Fanny Wolte
Belgium	Joëlle van Baarle, Fanny Cnops, Laura Gonzalez Escallon, Laurence Herman, Chloé Leurquin, Manon De Roey
Czech Republic	Katerina Krasova, Petra Kvidova, Silvia Dittertova, Kristyna Pavlickova, Katerina Ruzickova, Karolina Vlckova
Denmark	Nicole Broch Larsen, Charlotte Kring Lorentzen, Therese Kølbæk, Sara Monberg, Daisy Nielsen, Caroline Nistrup
England	Charlotte Ellis, Holly Clyburn, Hayley Davis, Charley Hull, Kelly Tidy, Lucy Williams
Finland	Peppiina Kaija, Sanna Nuutinen, Annika Nykanen, Noora Tamminen, Marika Voss, Minna Vuorenpää
France	Alexandra Bonetti, Léa Charpier, Justine Dreher, Perrine Petit, Ariane Provot, Alexandra Vilatte
Germany	Pia Halbig, Thea Hoffmeister, Lara Katzy, Stephanie Kirchmaier, Sophia Popov, Valerie Sternebeck
Iceland	Signy Arnorsdottir, Gudrun Bra Bjorgvinsdottir, Tinna Johannsdottir, Valdís Þóra Jónsdóttir, Ólafía Þórunn Kristinsdóttir, Sunna Vidisdottir
Ireland	Karen Delaney, Leona Maguire, Lisa Maguire, Danielle McVeigh, Stephanie Meadow, Charlene Reid
Italy	Alessandra Averna, Alessandra Braida, Chiara Brizzolari, Federica Maria Costantini, Eugenia Ferrero, Giulia Molinaro
Netherlands	Tessa De Bruijn, Myrte Eikenaar, Caroline Karsten, Varin Schilperoord, Joan Van De Kraats, Karlijn Zaanen
Norway	Tonje Daffinrud, Marita Engzelius, Elisabeth Haavardsholm, Lene Hafsten Mørch, Olivia Hüllert, Rachel Raastad
Russia	Ksenia Eremina, Rita Kim, Angelina Monakhova, Elizaveta Nikulina, Anna Vertchenova, Polina Vorobyeva
Scotland	Megan Briggs, Louise Kenney, Kelsey Mac Donald, Pamela Pretswell, Jane Turner, Rachael Watton
Slovenia	Ana Belac, Brigita Brumec, Zala Pia Jenko, Urša Orehek, Katja Pogacar, Tajda Sarkanj
Spain	Camilla Hedberg, Noemí Jiménez, Mireia Prat, Teresa Puga, Marta Silva, Rocio Sanchez
Sweden	Daniela Holmqvist, Josephine Janson, Nathalie Månsson, Madelene Sagström, Amanda Sträng, Johanna Tillström
Switzerland	Olivia Birrer, Cylia Damerau, Anais Maggetti, Valeria Martinoli, Rebecca Suenderhauf, Fanny Vuignier
Wales	Samantha Birks, Amy Boulden, Gemma Bradbury, Lucy Gold, Rebecca Harries, Chloe Williams

== Winners ==
2009 champions Germany lead the opening 36-hole qualifying competition, with a score of 15 under par 705, two strokes ahead of host team Denmark.

Individual leader in the 36-hole stroke-play competition was Leona Maguire, Ireland, with a score of 8 under par 136, one stroke ahead of nearest competitors

Defending champions Sweden won the championship, beating Spain 5–2 in the final and earned their seventh title.

Germany earned third place, beating Belgium 4–3 in the bronze match.

== Results ==
Qualification round

Team standings

Place	Country	Score	To par
1	Germany	359-346=705	−15
2	Denmark	345-362=707	−13
3	Spain	356-366=722	+2
4	Sweden	367-357=724	+4
T5	Ireland *	372.354=726	+6
T5	England	363-363=726	+6
7	Belgium	365-366=731	+11
8	France	379-354=733	+13
T9	Czech Republic *	365-371=736	+16
T9	Austria	368-368=736	+16
11	Finland	383-360=743	+23
12	Switzerland	369-375=744	+24
13	Scotland	376-370=746	+26
14	Iceland	379-369=748	+28
15	Italy	376-374=750	+30
16	Netherlands	375-378=753	+33
17	Norway	373-381=754	+34
18	Slovenia	369-397=766	+46
19	Wales	387-381=768	+48
20	Russia	389-402=791	+71

* Note: In the event of a tie the order was determined by the better total non-counting scores.

Individual leaders

Place	Player	Country	Score	To par
1	Leona Maguire	Ireland	72-64=136	−8
T2	Stephanie Kirchmayr	Germany	72-65=137	−7
T2	Daisy Nielsen	Denmark	68-69=137	−7
T2	Marta Silva	Spain	68-69=137	−7
5	Charley Hull	England	70-68=138	−6
6	Camilla Hedberg	Spain	67-72=139	−5
T7	Fanny Cnops	Belgium	71-69=140	−4
T7	Justine Dreher	France	72-68=140	−4
T7	Pia Halbig	Germany	71-69=140	−4
T7	Madelene Sagström	Sweden	69-71=140	−4

Note: There was no official award for the lowest individual score.

Flight A

Bracket

Quarter finals
Germany	4
France	3
Sweden	5
Ireland	2
Spain	5
England	2
Belgium	4
Denmark	3

Semi finals
Sweden	4
Germany	3
Spain	4.5
Belgium	2.5

Final
Sweden	5
Spain	2
Bronze match
Germany	4
Belgium	3

Elimination matches
France	3
Ireland	2
England	3
Denmark	2

Match for 5th place
England	3.5
France	1.5
Match for 7th place
Denmark	3
Ireland	2

Final games

Sweden	Spain
5	2
J. Tillström / M. Sagström 4 & 3	N. Jimenez / M. Prat
N. Månsson / A. Sträng 2 holes	M. Silva / C. Hedberg
Johanna Tillström	Marta Silva 4 & 3
Daniela Holmqvist 6 & 5	Rocio Sanchez
Amanda Sträng 3 & 1	Mireia Prat
Nathalie Månsson AS *	Noemi Jimenez AS *
Madelene Sagström AS *	Camilla Hedberg AS *

* Note: Game declared halved, since team match already decided.

Flight B

Bracket

Round 1
Netherlands	3
Czech Republic	2
Scotland	4
Switzerland	1
Finland	4.5
Iceland	1.5
Austria	3
Italy	2

Round 2
Scotland	4
Netherlands	1
Finland	3
Austria	2

Match for 9th place
Scotland	3
Finland	2
Match for 11th place
Austria	3
Netherlands	2

Elimination matches
Switzerland	4
Czech Republic	1
Italy	3
Iceland	2

Match for 13th place
Italy	3
Switzerland	2
Match for 15th place
Czech Republic	3.5
Iceland	1.5

Flight C

Team matches

1	Wales	Slovenia	0
4		1	

1	Slovenia	Russia	0
5		0	

1	Wales	Norway	0
4		1	

1	Wales	Russia	0
3		2	

1	Slovenia	Norway	0
3		2	

1	Norway	Russia	0
4		1	

Team standings

Country	Place	W	T	L	Game points	Points
Wales	17	3	0	0	11–4	3
Slovenia	18	2	0	1	9–6	2
Norway	19	1	0	2	7–8	1
Russia	20	0	0	3	3–12	0

Final standings

Place	Country
1st place, gold medalist(s)	Sweden
2nd place, silver medalist(s)	Spain
3rd place, bronze medalist(s)	Germany
4	Belgium
5	England
6	France
7	Denmark
8	Ireland
9	Scotland
10	Finland
11	Austria
12	Netherlands
13	Italy
14	Switzerland
15	Czech Republic
16	Iceland
17	Wales
18	Slovenia
19	Norway
20	Russia

== See also ==
- Espirito Santo Trophy – biennial world amateur team golf championship for women organized by the International Golf Federation.
- European Amateur Team Championship – European amateur team golf championship for men organised by the European Golf Association.
- European Ladies Amateur Championship – European amateur individual golf championship for women organised by the European Golf Association.
