= WPGA International Challenge =

Tournament information
- Location: Stoke-by-Nayland, Suffolk, England
- Established: 2013
- Courses: Stoke by Nayland Hotel Golf & Spa
- Par: 72
- Tour: LET Access Series
- Format: 54-hole Stroke play
- Prize fund: €35,000
- Final year: 2019

Tournament record score
- Aggregate: 205 Manon De Roey, Eva Gilly, Lydia Hall
- To par: –11 as above

Final champion
- (Belgium) Manon De Roey

The WPGA International Challenge was a women's professional golf tournament on the LET Access Series, held between 2013 and 2019 in Suffolk, England.

The event succeed the Challenge Tour's English Challenge, held at Stoke by Nayland Hotel, Golf & Spa in Stoke-by-Nayland 2010–2012. The 54-hole tournament, which was the only event on the LETAS schedule to be played in the United Kingdom during its run, featured an international field of 120 players.

Alice Hewson made her first appearance as a professional at the 2019 event, but lost by one stroke to Manon De Roey, who became the only player to defend her title after Lydia Hall narrowly lost out in 2018.

== Winners ==
Year	Winner	Country	Score	Margin of victory	Runner(s)-up	Ref
2019	Manon De Roey	Belgium	−6 (69-69-72=210)	1 stroke	(England) Alice Hewson (Sweden) My Leander (Italy) Lucrezia Colombotto Rosso	
2018	Manon De Roey	Belgium	−11 (68-67-70=205)	Playoff	(Wales) Lydia Hall	
2017	Lydia Hall	Wales	−9 (65-72-70=207)	Playoff	(France) Inès Lescudier	
2016	Eva Gilly	France	−11 (73-64-68=205)	3 strokes	(Austria) Sarah Schober	
2015	Natalia Escuriola (a)	Spain	−8 (68-67-73=208)	2 strokes	(Norway) Rachel Raastad	
2014	Daisy Nielsen	Denmark	−7 (70-69-70=209)	Playoff	(France) Melodie Bourdy	
2013	Hannah Ralph	England	−7 (68-70-71=209)	3 strokes	(Wales) Amy Boulden (Russia) Galina Rotmistrova	

== See also ==
- English Challenge
