= Sanna Nuutinen =

Finnish professional golfer

Personal information
- Nationality: Finland
- Born: 8 April 1991 (age 35) Helsinki, Finland
- Height: 5 ft 10 in (178 cm)

Career
- Sport: Golf
- College: Texas Christian University
- Turned professional: 2014
- Current tours: Ladies European Tour (joined 2017); LPGA Tour (joined 2022)
- Former tour: LET Access Series
- Professional wins: 3

Best results in LPGA major championships
- Chevron Championship: DNP
- Women's PGA C'ship: CUT: 2022
- U.S. Women's Open: DNP
- Women's British Open: T26: 2021
- Evian Championship: CUT: 2021, 2022

Sanna Nuutinen (born 8 April 1991) is a Finnish professional golfer playing on the Ladies European Tour (LET) and LPGA Tour. In 2019, she was runner-up at the Tipsports Czech Ladies Open and in 2020, she finished 5th on the LET Order of Merit.

== Amateur career ==
Nuutinen represented Finland at the 2007 and 2008 European Girls' Team Championship before capturing the bronze in the 2009 edition. She also played in the 2010 and 2011 European Ladies' Team Championship before securing the bronze in 2013 and the silver in 2014 as team captain. She also represented her country at the 2010 Espirito Santo Trophy and captured the bronze together with Krista Bakker and Noora Tamminen at the 2012 Espirito Santo Trophy.

Nuutinen played college golf with the TCU Horned Frogs at Texas Christian University 2010–2014 and graduated with a Bachelor of Science in Sport Psychology. In her sophomore year, she was Mountain West individual champion after winning a four-hole playoff.

== Professional career ==
Nuutinen turned professional in 2014 and returned to Finland to join the LET Access Series mid-season. She played in six tournaments with the best finish of T5 at the Mineks and Regnum Ladies Classic, and a lowest round of 67, five-under-par at the Open Generali de Strasbourg which included six birdies. She was runner-up at the 2015 Ribeira Sacra Patrimonio de la Humanidad International Ladies Open, before winning the 2016 NordicTrack Open de Strasbourg. She finished fifth on the 2016 LET Access Series Order of Merit, earning membership of the Ladies European Tour for the 2017 season.

Nuutinen played in eight events on the 2017 Ladies European Tour. Her best finish in 2017 was as runner-up at the Ladies Finnish Open, a LETAS event, two strokes behind compatriot Ursula Wikström. The following year, she played in seven LET events and was again runner-up at the Ladies Finnish Open, this time losing a playoff to Julia Engström. In 2019, Nuutinen was runner-up at the Lavaux Ladies Championship and beat Engström by two strokes to win the Amundi Czech Ladies Challenge, bot LETAS events. She also played in 14 LET events and posted a career-best T2 in the Tipsports Czech Ladies Open, a dual-ranked event with LETAS, helping her finish 21st on the LET Order of Merit.

On the 2020 Ladies European Tour, Nuutinen finished third at both the Tipsport Czech Ladies Open and the VP Bank Swiss Ladies Open, and by August she was the top Finnish golfer on the Women's World Golf Rankings. After a tie for 4th at the season ending Andalucia Costa Del Sol Open De España, she finished the year 5th on the LET Order of Merit.

In June 2021 she finished tied third at the Jabra Ladies Open and the Scandinavian Mixed on the LET, helping her qualify for the 2020 Tokyo Olympics along with Matilda Castren, just ahead of Ursula Wikström.

Nuutinen earned her card for the 2022 LPGA Tour through qualifying school.

== Amateur wins ==
- 2012 Mountain West Conference Championship

== Professional wins (3) ==
=== LET Access Series wins (3) ===
No.	Date	Tournament	Winning score	Margin of victory	Runner(s)-up	Ref
1	24 Sep 2016	NordicTrack Open de Strasbourg	−12 (69-68-67=204)	2 strokes	(England) Kiran Matharu	
2	3 Aug 2019	Amundi Czech Ladies Challenge	−7 (72-69-68=209)	2 strokes	(Sweden) Julia Engström (Czech Republic) Tereza Melecka (a) (Switzerland) Caroline Rominger	
3	5 Sep 2020	Flumserberg Ladies Open	−12 (69-68-67=204)	Playoff	(Norway) Stina Resen	

== Results in LPGA majors ==
Tournament	2020	2021	2022
Chevron Championship			
U.S. Women's Open			
Women's PGA Championship			CUT
The Evian Championship	NT	CUT	CUT
Women's British Open	CUT	T26	CUT

Did not play

CUT = missed the half-way cut
T = tied
NT = no tournament

== Team appearances ==
Amateur

- European Girls' Team Championship (representing Finland): 2007, 2008, 2009
- European Ladies' Team Championship (representing Finland): 2010, 2011, 2013, 2014
- Espirito Santo Trophy (representing Finland): 2010, 2012
