= Jabra Ladies Open =

Professional golf tournament

Tournament information
- Location: Evian-les-Bains, France
- Established: 2017
- Course: Evian Resort Golf Club
- Par: 71
- Tours: Ladies European Tour; LET Access Series (2018–2020)
- Format: Stroke play
- Prize fund: €300,000
- Month played: May
- Final year: 2025

Final champion
- (Czech Republic) Sára Kousková
- Location in France Location in Auvergne-Rhône-Alpes

The Jabra Ladies Open was a professional golf tournament, introduced on the Ladies European Tour schedule in 2018 and last played in 2025.

The tournament was played at the Evian Resort Golf Club in France and has since 2014 served as European qualifying competition for the Evian Championship, the continental Europe women's major. It was named the Jabra Ladies Open in 2016 and joined the LET Access Series schedule in 2017. It became the first dual ranking event on the LET Access Series and LET in 2018. In 2021 the tournament became solely an LET event.

In April 2026 it was announced that the event would merge with Lacoste Ladies Open de France to become the Jabra Ladies Open de France, the national open of France.

== Winners ==
Year	Tour(s)	Winner	Country	Score	Winner's share (€)	Runner(s)-up
2025	LET	Sára Kousková	Czech Republic	203 (−10)	45,000	(Singapore) Shannon Tan
2024	LET	Morgane Métraux	Switzerland	203 (−10)	45,000	(France) Agathe Sauzon (Switzerland) Chiara Tamburlini
2023	LET	Linn Grant	Sweden	204 (−9)	45,000	(France) Céline Herbin (Netherlands) Anne van Dam
2022	LET	Tiia Koivisto	Finland	207 (−6)	37,500	(Australia) Whitney Hillier
2021	LET	Pia Babnik	Slovenia	209 (−4)	30,000	(England) Annabel Dimmock
2020	LET · LETAS	Cancelled due to the COVID-19 pandemic				
2019	LET · LETAS	Annabel Dimmock	England	206 (−7)	24,000	(France) Pauline Roussin-Bouchard (a)
2018	LET · LETAS	Astrid Vayson de Pradenne	France	206 (−7)	19,200	(Germany) Karolin Lampert
2017	LETAS	Isabelle Boineau	France	206 (−7)	8,000	(Sweden) Johanna Gustavsson
