= Manon De Roey =

Belgian professional golfer (born 1991)

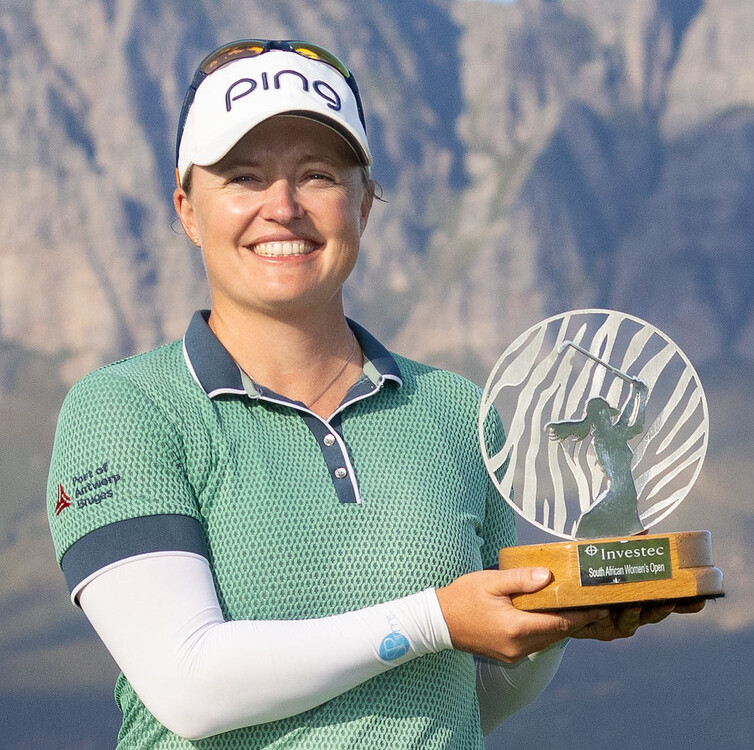

Personal information
- Nationality: Belgium
- Born: 12 December 1991 (age 34) Schilde, Belgium

Career
- Sport: Golf
- College: University of New Mexico
- Turned professional: 2015
- Current tours: Ladies European Tour; LPGA Tour
- Former tour: LET Access Series
- Professional wins: 7

Number of wins by tour
- Ladies European Tour: 3
- WPGA Tour of Australasia: 1
- Other: 3

Best results in LPGA major championships
- Chevron Championship: T9: 2025
- Women's PGA C'ship: T53: 2026
- U.S. Women's Open: CUT: 2023, 2025
- Women's British Open: T47: 2026
- Evian Championship: T38: 2025

Achievements and awards
- Annette De Vooght Trophy: 2009

Manon De Roey (born 12 December 1991) is a professional golfer from Belgium who plays on the Ladies European Tour. In 2022, she won the Aramco Team Series – Bangkok individual title. Most recently, she has won the Investec South African Women's Open in 2024 and the Australian Women's Classic in 2025.

== Amateur career ==
De Roey started playing golf at age 11 and won her first tournament at age 16, the Belgian Youth Trophy. A year later she won the Flanders Trophy and was awarded the Annette de Vooght Trophy as the best Belgian female player under 18.

She became a member of the Belgian National Team in 2008 and competed for her country at several European Girls' Team Championship and European Ladies' Team Championships, as well as the 2014 World Amateur Team Championship, the Espirito Santo Trophy, in Karuizawa, Japan.

After graduating from the Top Sport School for Golf in Hasselt, Belgium, in 2010, she studied at the University of New Mexico and graduated with a major in Psychology and minor in Management in May 2014. She played college golf as a member of the New Mexico Lobos team for four years. In 2012, she won Colonel Wallenberg's RAM Classic in Fort Collins, Colorado and the Mountain West Championships at the Mission Hills Country Club. In 2014, the New Mexico Lobos won the Mountain West Conference, again at Mission Hills Country Club. De Roey received honours as an All-American Scholar from the National Golf Coaches' Association in 2010 and was named All-Conference Second Team in 2013 and 2014.

== Professional career ==
De Roey joined the Ladies European Tour (LET) in 2016 but failed to make an impact and dropped down to the LET Access Series for the 2017 season, where she had three top-10 finishes including a T3 at the Swedish PGA Championship and finished 6th on the Order of Merit. In 2018, De Roey played in 12 LET events with a best result of T22 in the season-ending Andalucia Costa Del Sol Open De España. She also played in 11 events on the LET Access Series and won her first professional title, the WPGA International Challenge, at Stoke-by-Nayland in England. In 2019, she played in 14 LET tournaments and recorded four top-10 finishes, ending 23rd on the Order of Merit. She also played on the LET Access Series where she won two tournaments, including successfully defending her title at the WPGA International Challenge, and finished best woman and third overall in the St Malo Golf Mixed Open.

In March 2020, De Roey started the final round of the Women's NSW Open in Australia with a five-shot lead after rounds of 71, 64 and 66, but faltered on the final nine and shot 75, ultimately finishing second two strokes behind Julia Engström.

In 2022, De Roey clinched her first LET title winning the Aramco Team Series – Bangkok individual title. She went into the final day two shots behind leader Patty Tavatanakit, but equaled the course record firing a bogey-free 66 (−6) to win with a total of 13-under-par, three strokes ahead of runner-up Johanna Gustavsson.

She earned her LPGA Tour card for 2023 via Q-School.

== Amateur wins ==
- 2008 Belgian Youth Trophy
- 2009 Flanders Trophy
- 2012 Colonel Wallenberg's RAM Classic, Mountain West Championships
- 2013 Belgian National Strokeplay
- 2014 Belgian National Strokeplay, Belgian National Matchplay

== Professional wins (7) ==
=== Ladies European Tour (3) ===
No.	Date	Tournament	Winning score	To par	Margin of victory	Runner-up
1	14 May 2022	Aramco Team Series – Bangkok	70-67-66=203	–13	3 strokes	(Sweden) Johanna Gustavsson
2	28 Apr 2024	Investec South African Women's Open	69-67-66-72=274	–14	4 strokes	(England) Gabriella Cowley
3	16 Mar 2025	Australian Women's Classic^{[1]}	69-63-69=201	–9	1 stroke	(England) Cara Gainer

^{1} Co-sanctioned by the WPGA Tour of Australasia.

=== LET Access Series (3) ===
No.	Date	Tournament	Winning score	To par	Margin of victory	Runner(s)-up
1	15 Sep 2018	WPGA International Challenge	68-67-70=205	–11	Playoff	(Wales) Lydia Hall
2	19 Jul 2019	Santander Golf Tour LETAS Valencia	68-71-72=211	–5	1 stroke	(Spain) Carmen Alonso
3	15 Sep 2019	WPGA International Challenge (2)	69-69-72=210	–6	1 stroke	(Italy) Lucrezia Colombotto Rosso (England) Alice Hewson (Sweden) My Leander

=== WPGA Tour of Australasia wins (2) ===
- 2020 Aoyuan International Moss Vale Pro-Am
- 2025 Australian Women's Classic^{[2]}

^{2} Co-sanctioned by the Ladies European Tour.

== Results in LPGA majors ==
Results not in chronological order.

Tournament	2020	2021	2022	2023	2024	2025	2026
Chevron Championship						T9	T49
U.S. Women's Open				CUT		CUT	
Women's PGA Championship						CUT	T53
The Evian Championship	NT		CUT	CUT	CUT	T38	CUT
Women's British Open	CUT	CUT	CUT	CUT	T71	T55	T47

Top 10
Did not play

CUT = missed the half-way cut
NT = no tournament
T = tied

=== Summary ===
Tournament	Wins	2nd	3rd	Top-5	Top-10	Top-25	Events	Cuts made
Chevron Championship	0	0	0	0	1	1	2	2
U.S. Women's Open	0	0	0	0	0	0	2	0
Women's PGA Championship	0	0	0	0	0	0	2	1
The Evian Championship	0	0	0	0	0	0	5	1
Women's British Open	0	0	0	0	0	0	7	3
Totals	0	0	0	0	1	1	18	7

- Most consecutive cuts made – 4 (2025 Evian – 2026 Women's PGA)
- Longest streak of top-10s – 1 (once)

== Team appearances ==
Amateur

- European Girls' Team Championship (representing Belgium): 2009
- European Ladies' Team Championship (representing Belgium): 2010, 2011, 2013, 2014
- Espirito Santo Trophy (representing Belgium): 2014

Professional

- European Championships (representing Belgium): 2018
