= Crete Golf Club =

Golf course in Greece

Coordinates: 35.290°N 25.360°E

The Crete Golf Club a golf course in Crete, Greece. It hosts such tournaments as the Aegean Airlines ProAM and the annual International Diaspora Tournament.
