= Tonje Daffinrud =

Norwegian professional golfer

Personal information
- Full name: Tonje Frydenberg Daffinrud
- Nationality: Norway
- Born: 19 September 1991 (age 35) Tønsberg, Norway
- Height: 1.78 m (5 ft 10 in)

Career
- Sport: Golf
- College: University of Denver
- Turned professional: 2014
- Current tours: Ladies European Tour (joined 2015); LET Access Series; Swedish Golf Tour
- Professional wins: 5

Best results in LPGA major championships
- Chevron Championship: DNP
- Women's PGA C'ship: DNP
- U.S. Women's Open: DNP
- Women's British Open: CUT: 2017, 2018, 2019, 2020
- Evian Championship: DNP

Achievements and awards
- Swedish Golf Tour Order of Merit: 2019

Tonje Frydenberg Daffinrud (born 19 September 1991) is a retired Norwegian professional golfer. She played on the Ladies European Tour between 2015 and 2021, and represented Norway at the 2020 Tokyo Olympics.

== Amateur career ==
As a junior, Daffinrud represented Europe at the 2009 Junior Solheim Cup. She also represented the Norwegian National Team at the European Ladies' Team Championship and Espirito Santo Trophy. She played collegiate golf with the Denver Pioneers, like her compatriot Espen Kofstad, and graduated from the University of Denver in 2014 with a degree in International Business and Economics.

In 2016, she won the Norwegian National Golf Championship and was awarded the Kongepokal.

== Professional career ==
Daffinrud joined the LET Access Series midway through the 2014 season and won two tournaments back-to-back in October, the Azores Ladies Open in Azores, Portugal and the Grecotel Amirandes Ladies Open in Crete, Greece. After three further top-five finishes, she finished fifth on the 2014 LETAS Order of Merit and earned LET membership for the 2015 Ladies European Tour.

Her rookie season on the LET in 2015 was affected by injury. She played in eight tournaments with a season best T13 at the Lalla Meryem Cup. In 2017, she earned her first top-10 finish with a T6 in the Oates Vic Open and in 2019 posted two top-10s, T10 in La Reserva de Sotogrande Invitational and her career best finish of T4 in the Ladies European Thailand Championship along with Marianne Skarpnord. She qualified for the 2017, 2019 and 2020 Women's British Open as one of the top 25 from the current LET Order of Merit, and was successful in the local qualifiers in 2018.

In 2019, she won the Swedish Golf Tour Order of Merit and finished a career-best 18th on the LET Order of Merit.

Plagued by injuries, Daffinrud announced her retirement from tour following the 2020 Tokyo Olympics, just days before her 30th birthday.

== Professional wins (5) ==
=== LET Access Series wins (3) ===
No.	Date	Tournament	Winning score	To par	Margin of victory	Runner(s)-up
1	3 Oct 2014	Azores Ladies Open	71-68-73=212	−4	3 strokes	(Croatia) Daniela Prorokova
2	10 Oct 2014	Grecotel Amirandes Ladies Open	66-67-70=203	−10	3 strokes	(Denmark) Daisy Nielsen
3	29 Aug 2019	Scandic PGA Championship^{1}	66-70-66=202	−14	2 strokes	(Sweden) Johanna Gustavsson (Sweden) Maja Stark

^{1}Co-sanctioned by the Swedish Golf Tour

=== Swedish Golf Tour (2) ===
No.	Date	Tournament	Winning score	To par	Margin of victory	Runner(s)-up
1	4 Jul 2019	Moss & Rygge Open	70-64-67=201	−15	8 strokes	(Sweden) Michaela Finn
2	29 Aug 2019	Scandic PGA Championship^{1}	66-70-66=202	−14	2 strokes	(Sweden) Johanna Gustavsson (Sweden) Maja Stark

^{1}Co-sanctioned by the LET Access Series

=== Other wins ===
- 2016 Norwegian National Golf Championship

== Results in LPGA majors ==
Results not in chronological order.

Tournament	2017	2018	2019	2020
ANA Inspiration				
U.S. Women's Open				
Women's PGA Championship				
The Evian Championship				NT
Women's British Open	CUT	CUT	CUT	CUT

Did not play

CUT = missed the half-way cut.
NT = no tournament

== Team appearances ==
Amateur

- European Ladies' Team Championship (representing Norway): 2007, 2010, 2011
- Espirito Santo Trophy (representing Norway): 2008, 2010, 2012, 2014
- Junior Solheim Cup: (representing Europe): 2009
