= Mireia Prat =

Spanish professional golfer

Personal information
- Full name: Mireia Prat Caballería
- Nationality: Spain
- Born: 14 October 1989 (age 37) Torelló, Catalonia, Spain
- Height: 5 ft 5 in (165 cm)

Career
- Sport: Golf
- Turned professional: 2012
- Current tours: LET (joined 2012); Santander Golf Tour
- Professional wins: 9

Achievements and awards
- LETAS Order of Merit winner: 2013
- Santander Golf Tour Order of Merit winner: 2023

Mireia Prat Caballería (born 14 October 1989) is a Spanish professional golfer and Ladies European Tour player. She won the 2013 LETAS Order of Merit.

== Amateur career ==
Prat hails from Torelló in the Province of Barcelona, and started playing golf at the age of nine. She enjoyed an amateur career where she representing Spain at the international level.

She was part of the Spanish team that finished fifth at the 2007 European Girls' Team Championship. She played in the European Ladies' Team Championship three times. In 2009, her team finished fourth. In 2010, she had the best individual stroke play score alongside Camilla Lennarth and Spain lost the final to Sweden 4–3, after Prat was beaten in the singles by Lennarth on the 19th hole. In 2011, Spain again lost the final to Sweden, this time 5–2, and Prat lost her single match in the final to Amanda Sträng, 3 and 1.

== Professional career ==
Prat turned professional in early 2012 and joined the LET. She finished T30 at LET Final Q-School and lost a playoff for the 30th and last card, but played in 11 events her rookie season with limited status.

In 2013, Prat made five cuts in six starts on the LET. She concentrated on the LET Access Series, where she won two the Ocho Golf Ladies Open – Galicia and Costa Blanca Ladies Open, and was runner-up at the Azores Ladies Open. She topped the Order of Merit, securing an LET card for the 2014 season. In 2019, Prat went back to Q-School and finished 23rd to earn membership for the 2020 season, where she finish 72nd in the Race to Costa del Sol.

She was runner-up at the 2017 Terre Blanche Ladies Open in France and at the 2018 Santander Golf Tour LETAS El Prat, one stroke behind Julia Engström. In 2020, she lost a playoff to Luna Sobrón at Santander Golf Tour Lerma.

In 2021, she won the Santander Golf Tour Sevilla, which doubled as the Spanish National Championship.

In 2023, she was runner-up one stroke behind Casandra Alexander at the Jabra Ladies Classic on the Sunshine Ladies Tour, having led the tournament ahead of the final round after an opening score of 63. In Spain, she won three tournaments on the Santander Golf Tour and secured the Order of Merit.

== Amateur wins ==
- 2003 Interterritorial Children's Championship
- 2006 Interterritorial Junior Women's Championship
- 2008 Finnish International Junior Women's Championship
- 2009 Finnish International Junior Women's Championship
- 2010 Interterritorial Junior Women's Championship
- 2011 Comunidad Valenciana Women's Amateur Championship

== Professional wins (9) ==
=== LET Access Series (2) ===
No.	Date	Tournament	Winning score	To par	Margin of victory	Runner(s)-up	Ref
1	3 May 2013	Ocho Golf Ladies Open – Galicia	202	–8	1 stroke	(Australia) Bree Arthur	
2	20 Aug 2013	Costa Blanca Ladies Open	226	+10	2 strokes	(England) Holly Calvert (Italy) Vittoria Valvassori	

LET Access Series playoff record (0–1)

No.	Year	Tournament	Opponent	Result
1	2013	Mineks Ladies Classic	(Belgium) Chloé Leurquin	Lost to birdie on the first extra hole

=== Santander Golf Tour (7) ===
- 2018 Santander Golf Tour Lerma, Santander Golf Tour Neguri
- 2019 Santander Golf Tour Basozabal
- 2021 Santander Golf Tour Sevilla (Spanish National Championship)
- 2023 Santander Golf Tour San Sebastián, Santander Golf Tour Burgos, Santander Golf Tour Cantabria

== Team appearances ==
Amateur

- European Girls' Team Championship (representing Spain): 2007
- European Ladies' Team Championship (representing Spain): 2009, 2010, 2011
