= Camilla Hedberg =

Spanish professional golfer (born 1993)

Personal information
- Full name: Camilla Hedberg Bertrand
- Nationality: Spain
- Born: 5 February 1993 (age 33)

Career
- Sport: Golf
- College: University of Florida
- Turned professional: 2015
- Former tours: Ladies European Tour; LET Access Series
- Professional wins: 3

Best results in LPGA major championships
- Chevron Championship: 72nd: 2013
- Women's PGA C'ship: DNP
- U.S. Women's Open: DNP
- Women's British Open: DNP
- Evian Championship: DNP

Achievements and awards
- SEC Freshman of the Year: 2012

Camilla Hedberg Bertrand (born 5 February 1993) is a professional golfer from Spain who has played on the Ladies European Tour. As an amateur, she won the 2011 European Nations Cup – Copa Sotogrande, the 2012 World University Golf Championship, and the 2013 European Ladies' Team Championship.

== Amateur career ==
Hedberg was born in Barcelona to a Swedish father and Spanish mother. She had a successful amateur career, was ranked number one amateur in Spain and several times national champion. She represented her country at an international level, including at the 2012 Espirito Santo Trophy in Turkey, where her team finished tied fifth. She was part of the Spanish team that was third at both the 2009 and 2010 European Girls' Team Championships, and the team that won the 2013 European Ladies' Team Championship in England. She appeared for Europe at the Vagliano Trophy in 2011 and 2013.

In 2012, she won the World University Golf Championship in the Czech Republic one stroke ahead of Amy Anderson, and the Spanish National Ladies Championship, two strokes ahead of Nuria Iturrioz.

Hedberg attended the University of Florida in Gainesville from 2011 to 2015 and graduated with a degree in criminology. She competed for the Florida Gators women's golf team, was the Southeastern Conference Freshman of the Year in 2012, and won three tournaments her sophomore year. Hedberg qualified for the 2013 Kraft Nabisco Championship, made the cut, and was the leading amateur after two rounds.

== Professional career ==
Hedberg turned professional in July 2015. She joined the Ladies European Tour with limited status and played in only a dozen LET events 2016–2020, spending the bulk of her time in the LET Access Series. She finished the 2018 season ranked 122nd in the LET Order of Merit.

== Amateur wins ==
- 2011 Campeonato Nacional Individual, European Nations Cup – Copa Sotogrande, Valencian Community Amateur
- 2012 Cougar Classic, Betsy Rawls Invitational, Spanish National Ladies Championship, World University Golf Championship
- 2013 Florida Challenge
- 2014 Campeonato de Espana Amateur

== Professional wins (3) ==
=== Santander Golf Tour (3) ===
No.	Date	Tournament	Winning score	To par	Margin of victory	Runner-up	Ref
1	20 Jul 2018	Santander Golf Tour Zaragoza	67-70=137	–7	4 strokes	(Spain) Natalia Escuriola	
2	11 Oct 2018	Santander Golf Tour A Coruña	73-73=146	+2	3 strokes	(South Korea) Jeny Ji	
3	25 Mar 2022	Santander Golf Tour Zaragoza (2)	67-72=139	–5	2 strokes	(Japan) Maho Hayakawa	

== Team appearances ==
Amateur

- European Girls' Team Championship (representing Spain): 2009, 2010
- European Ladies' Team Championship (representing Spain): 2011, 2013 (winners), 2014
- Vagliano Trophy (representing the Continent of Europe): 2011 (winners), 2013 (winners)
- Espirito Santo Trophy (representing Spain): 2012
