= Luna Sobrón =

Spanish professional golfer

Personal information
- Full name: Luna Sobrón Galmés
- Nationality: Spain
- Born: 22 May 1994 (age 32)
- Height: 5 ft 4 in (1.63 m)

Career
- Sport: Golf
- Turned professional: 2016
- Current tour: LET (joined 2017)
- Former tour: LPGA Tour (joined 2018)
- Professional wins: 8

Best results in LPGA major championships
- Chevron Championship: DNP
- Women's PGA C'ship: T52: 2021
- U.S. Women's Open: T34: 2018
- Women's British Open: T13: 2015
- Evian Championship: CUT: 2021

Achievements and awards
- Smyth Salver: 2015

Luna Sobrón Galmés (born 22 May 1994) is a professional golfer from Spain and a Ladies European Tour (LET) and LPGA Tour player. She won the 2014 European Ladies Amateur and has finished runner-up on the LET twice.

== Early life and amateur career ==
Sobrón resides in Palma de Mallorca and started playing golf at the age of two guided by her father, who is also a golf professional. She had a successful amateur career, where she won the 2013 Spanish International Stroke Play Championship, was runner-up at the 2013 The Women's Amateur Championship, and won the 2014 European Ladies Amateur.

She finished tied for 13th at the 2015 Women's British Open at Turnberry to take home the Smyth Salver award for low amateur.

Sobrón represented Spain at an international level, and was part of the teams that were runner-up at the 2012 European Girls' Team Championship in Germany, and won the 2013 European Ladies' Team Championship in England.

== Professional career ==
Sobrón turned professional in 2016 and played on the LET Access Series, where she won her first title at the Terre Blanche Ladies Open in France. In 2017, she joined the Ladies European Tour, where she recorded three top-15 finishes. She finished tied 3rd at the 2018 Lacoste Ladies Open de France, and the 2019 Fatima Bint Mubarak Ladies Open. She finished 39th on the 2019 Order of Merit.

In 2020, she was joint runner-up at the Saudi Ladies Team International with Stephanie Kyriacou and Anne van Dam, two strokes behind Emily Kristine Pedersen, and she was runner-up again at the 2025 Tipsport Czech Ladies Open, two strokes behind Casandra Alexander.

Sobrón also joined the LPGA Tour in 2018 after finishing tied 5th at Q-School. In her rookie season she played in 21 events and made eight cuts, including at the 2018 U.S. Women's Open (tied 34th). In the six seasons from 2018 to 2023, her best finishes in the rankings were 121st (2018) and 124th (2021).

In one of her few Epson Tour starts, she made a hole-in-one on a 247 yard par-4 at the 2022 Florida's Natural Charity Classic.

== Amateur wins ==
- 2013 Spanish International Stroke Play Championship
- 2014 European Ladies Amateur Championship

== Professional wins (8) ==
=== LET Access Series (3) ===
No.	Date	Tournament	Winning score	To par	Margin of victory	Runner(s)-up	Ref
1	3 Apr 2016	Terre Blanche Ladies Open	67-68-76=211	–8	1 stroke	(France) Lucie André (Spain) María Parra	
2	28 Oct 2017	Castellum Ladies Open	74-67-67=208	–8	Playoff	(France) Astrid Vayson de Pradenne	
3	17 Oct 2020	Santander Golf Tour Lerma^{1}	64-72-68=204	−12	Playoff	(France) Anaelle Carnet (Spain) Mireia Prat	

^{1} Co-sanctioned by the Santander Golf Tour

=== Santander Golf Tour (6) ===
- 2018 Santander Golf Tour Madrid, Santander Golf Tour Pedreña
- 2018 Campeonato de España
- 2019 Campeonato de España
- 2020 Campeonato de España, Santander Golf Tour Lerma^{1}

^{1} Co-sanctioned by the LET Access Series

== Results in LPGA majors ==
Results not in chronological order

Tournament	2015	2016	2017	2018	2019	2020	2021
ANA Inspiration							
U.S. Women's Open				T34			T57
Women's PGA Championship				CUT	CUT		T52
The Evian Championship						NT	CUT
Women's British Open	T13LA	CUT				CUT	CUT

Did not play

LA = Low amateur
CUT = missed the half-way cut
NT = no tournament
T = tied

== Team appearances ==
Amateur

- Junior Solheim Cup (representing Europe): 2011
- European Girls' Team Championship (representing Spain): 2011, 2012
- European Ladies' Team Championship (representing Spain): 2013 (winners), 2014, 2015, 2016
- Espirito Santo Trophy (representing Spain): 2014, 2016
- Vagliano Trophy (representing the Continent of Europe): 2015 (winners)
- Patsy Hankins Trophy (representing Europe): 2016

== See also ==
- List of albatrosses in notable tournaments
