= LET Access Series =

Professional women's golf tour

- Current season, competition or edition: 2026 LET Access Series
- Sport: Golf
- Founded: 2010
- Country: Based in Europe. Tournaments held in: Austria; Belgium; Czech Republic; Denmark; England; Finland; France; Germany; Greece; Ireland; Italy; Morocco; Norway; Portugal; Scotland; Spain; Slovakia; Sweden; Switzerland; Turkey; Ukraine
- Most recent champion: (England) Gemma Clews (2025 Order of Merit winner)
- Most titles: 4 (tie): (Germany) Helen Briem (Czech Republic) Sára Kousková (Sweden) Emma Nilsson
- Related competitions: Ladies European Tour
- Website: LETAccess.com

The LET Access Series (LETAS) is a professional golf tour for women and the official development tour to the Ladies European Tour.

Launched in 2010, the LET Access Series provides players with an opportunity to compete and progress on to the LET. Eligible for membership are all female professional golfers and amateurs over 18 with a handicap of 2 or better.

== Women's World Golf Rankings ==
As one of the eight major women's tours (along with LPGA, JLPGA, KLPGA, LET, WPGA, Epson Tour and China LPGA Tour) performances on LETAS carry Women's World Golf Rankings points.

== Seasons and results ==
=== Past tour schedules ===
By 2014 over 250 professionals and 200 amateurs had competed. The season consisted of 16 tournaments in 12 countries with prize funds of €30,000 – €50,000, and saw 11 winners from 8 countries. By 2026 the tour had members from 45 nationalities spanning six continents.

In 2020, a majority of tournaments were postponed or cancelled due to the COVID-19 pandemic.

Year	Ranking tournaments	Total purse (€)	LET cards awarded
2026	19	993,000	7
2025	19	950,500	7
2024	15	735,000	7
2023	19	857,500	6
2022	20	890,000	6
2021	14	552,500	6
2020	8	332,500	1
2019	20	1,032,000 (Note: €250,000 in two dual-ranking events with the Ladies European Tour)	5
2018	13	590,000	5
2017	13	500,000	5
2016	15	525,000	5
2015	15	510,000	5
2014	16	525,000	5
2013	15	432,500	5
2012	13	320,000	3
2011	7	175,000	2
2010	5	125,000	2

=== Order of Merit and Award winners ===
The top players on the LETAS Order of Merit earn LET membership for the Ladies European Tour. Players finishing in positions below (since 2024 those in place 8–32), get to skip the first stage of the qualifying event and automatically progress to the final stage of the Lalla Aicha Tour School.

The Players’ Player of the Year, introduced in 2024, is awarded by membership vote and recognizes not only excellence on the course but also sportsmanship, leadership, and contribution to the sport.

Season	Order of Merit winner	Rookie of the Year	Player's Player of the Year
2025	(England) Gemma Clews	(England) Charlotte Heath	(Austria) Katharina Mühlbauer
2024	(Sweden) Kajsa Arwefjäll	(Sweden) Kajsa Arwefjäll	(England) Billie-Jo Smith
2023	(Denmark) Sofie Kibsgaard Nielsen	(Denmark) Sofie Kibsgaard Nielsen	n/a
2022	(Czech Republic) Sára Kousková	(Czech Republic) Sára Kousková	n/a
2021	(England) Lily May Humphreys	(England) Lily May Humphreys	n/a
2020	(Finland) Tiia Koivisto	(England) Cara Gainer	n/a
2019	(England) Hayley Davis	(Spain) Laura Gómez Ruiz	n/a
2018	(Sweden) Emma Nilsson	(France) Emie Peronnin	n/a
2017	(England) Meghan MacLaren	(Spain) Natasha Fear	n/a
2016	(Austria) Sarah Schober	n/a	n/a
2015	(Germany) Olivia Cowan	n/a	n/a
2014	(Sweden) Emma Westin	n/a	n/a
2013	(Spain) Mireia Prat	n/a	n/a
2012	(Scotland) Pamela Pretswell	n/a	n/a
2011	(Netherlands) Marieke Nivard	n/a	n/a
2010	(France) Caroline Afonso	n/a	n/a

== Multiple winners ==
Winners of three or more LETAS events, ordered chronologically. It is rare for someone to accumulate many wins as success at this level usually leads to promotion to the Ladies European Tour. In 2024, Helen Briem became the first player to accumulate four wins in one season.

Rank	Player	Wins	Winning span
T1	(Sweden) Emma Nilsson	4	2014–2018
T1	(Czech Republic) Sára Kousková	4	2021–2022
T1	(Germany) Helen Briem	4	2024
T4	(France) Caroline Afonso	3	2010–2012
T4	(Sweden) Emma Westin	3	2014
T4	(Germany) Olivia Cowan	3	2015
T4	(France) Valentine Derrey	3	2014–2017
T4	(Scotland) Carly Booth	3	2012–2019
T4	(Norway) Tonje Daffinrud	3	2014–2019
T4	(Belgium) Manon De Roey	3	2018–2019
T4	(Finland) Sanna Nuutinen	3	2016–2020
T4	(Spain) Luna Sobrón	3	2016–2020
T4	(England) Rachael Goodall	3	2018–2021
T4	(Denmark) Sofie Kibsgaard Nielsen	3	2023
T4	(Sweden) Kajsa Arwefjäll	3	2021–2024
T4	(England) Gemma Clews	3	2023–2025
T4	(Mexico) Fernanda Lira	3	2025

== See also ==
- Ladies European Tour
- Epson Tour
