= 2025 Swedish Golf Tour (women) =

40th season of the Swedish Golf Tour (women)

2025 Swedish Golf Tour (women) season
- Duration: June 2025 – August 2025
- Number of official events: 4
- Order of Merit winner: (Iceland) Ragga Kristinsdóttir

The 2025 Ahlsell Nordic Golf Tour was the 40th season of the Swedish Golf Tour, a series of professional golf tournaments for women held in Sweden and neighboring countries.

== Schedule ==
The season consisted of 4 tournaments played between June and August. With the Danish Ladies Open included on the schedule since 2020 removed, all events are held in Sweden.

The Swedish PGA Championship was moved from Gothenburg to Linköping. The Swedish Matchplay Championship, cancelled in 2023, did not return. Instead, the Swedish Strokeplay Championship was re-introduced, not played since 2007.

Key

Regular events
National Championships

Date	Tournament	Venue	Location	Winner	Purse (SEK)	Tour (Note: Tournaments were co-sanctioned by the LET Access Series (LETAS), forming its Scandinavian Swing)	Ref
28 Jun	PGA of Sweden Championship Landeryd	Landeryd Golf Club	Sweden	(Austria) Katharina Mühlbauer	600,000	LETAS	
4 Jul	Swedish Strokeplay Championship	GolfUppsala Söderby	Sweden	(Sweden) Andrea Lignell	€45,000	LETAS	
11 Jul	Västerås Ladies Open	Skerike Golf Club	Sweden	(Iceland) Ragga Kristinsdóttir	€45,000	LETAS	
8 Aug	Ahlsell Trophy	Gränna Golf Club	Sweden	(Spain) Amaia Latorre	€45,000	LETAS	

== Ranking ==
Rank	Player	Events	Result
1	(Iceland) Ragga Kristinsdóttir	3	12,697
2	(Austria) Katharina Mühlbauer	3	9,797
3	(Sweden) Andrea Lignell	4	8,627
4	(Sweden) Isabell Ekström	4	8,035
5	(Spain) Amaia Latorre	1	7,200

== See also ==
- 2025 Ladies European Tour
