= Katharina Mühlbauer =

Austrian professional golfer

Personal information
- Nationality: Austria
- Born: 1997 (age 28–29) Vöcklabruck, Austria
- Life partner: Max Mayer

Career
- Sport: Golf
- Turned professional: 2020
- Current tour: LET Access Series
- Professional wins: 2

Achievements and awards
- LET Access Series Player's Player of the Year: 2025

Katharina Mühlbauer (born c. 1997) is an Austrian professional golfer. She won the 2023 Trust Golf Links Series - Ramside Hall and the 2025 Swedish PGA Championship on the LET Access Series.

== Amateur career ==
Mühlbauer was introduced to golf by her grandmother when she was 8 and represents GC Regau Attersee-Traunsee. She had a successful amateur career and won the Austrian Junior Stroke Play Championship twice, and played on the Austrian National Team in European team competitions. In 2019, she won both the Austrian Stroke Play Championship and Austrian Match Play Championship, and topped the national amateur rankings.

Around Europe, she won the 2019 Croatia International Amateur Championship, and was runner-up at the 2016 Liechtenstein Open behind Switzerland's Vanessa Knecht, the 2017 Czech International Amateur, and the 2019 Austrian International Amateur, behind Nataliya Guseva.

== Professional career ==
Mühlbauer turned professional in 2020 and joined the LET Access Series. In 2021, she tied for 3rd at the Anna Nordqvist Västerås Open and finished 10th in the rankings. She tied for 8th at the 2021 Tipsport Czech Ladies Open, a Ladies European Tour event. In 2022, she finished 3rd at the Amundi Czech Ladies Challenge behind Chiara Noja and Sára Kousková, and finished 11th in the rankings.

Mühlbauer secured her maiden professional win at the 2023 Trust Golf Links Series - Ramside Hall in England, and finished the season 10th in the rankings. She was runner-up in her first professional event on home soil, the 2025 Allegria Stegersbach Ladies Open, where she finished a stroke behind Gemma Clews. When she lost a playoff at the Amundi Czech Ladies Challenge a few weeks later, she logged her 20th top-10 finish on the LET Access Series.

== Amateur wins ==
- 2016 Austrian Junior Stroke Play Championship
- 2017 Austrian Junior Stroke Play Championship
- 2018 Austrian Match Play Championship, OGV PGA Championship
- 2019 Austrian Stroke Play Championship, Austrian Match Play Championship, Croatia International Amateur Championship

== Professional wins (2) ==
=== LET Access Series wins (2) ===
No.	Date	Tournament	Winning score	To par	Margin of victory	Runner-up
1	26 Jul 2023	Trust Golf Links Series - Ramside Hall	68-70-68=206	−10	3 strokes	(England) Hannah Screen
2	28 Jun 2025	Swedish PGA Championship	66-68-71-74=279	−7	3 strokes	(Sweden) Louisa Carlbom

LET Access Series playoff record (0–1)

No.	Year	Tournament	Opponents	Result
1	2025	Amundi Czech Ladies Challenge	(Australia) Justice Bosio (England) Gemma Clews (France) Alice Kong (a)	Kong won with birdie on first extra hole

== Team appearances ==
Amateur

- European Girls' Team Championship (representing Austria): 2015
- European Ladies' Team Championship (representing Austria): 2017, 2018, 2019
- European Nations Cup – Copa Sotogrande (representing Austria): 2018
