= 2022 Swedish Golf Tour (women) =

37th season of the Swedish Golf Tour (women)

2022 Swedish Golf Tour (women) season
- Duration: May 2022 – September 2022
- Number of official events: 6
- Order of Merit winner: (Germany) Patricia Isabel Schmidt

The 2022 Ahlsell Nordic Golf Tour was the 37th season of the Swedish Golf Tour, a series of professional golf tournaments for women held in Sweden and neighboring countries.

Tournaments also featured on the 2022 LET Access Series (LETAS).

== Schedule ==
The season consisted of 6 tournaments played between May and September, where one event was held in Denmark.

Date	Tournament	Venue	Location	Winner	Purse	Tour (Note: Several tournaments are hosted under co-sanctioning agreement with the LET Access Series (LETAS))	Ref
21 May	PGA Championship Trelleborg	Tegelberga Golf Club	Sweden	(Sweden) Meja Örtengren (a)	€50,000	LETAS	
17 Jun	Smørum Ladies Open	Smørum Golf Club	Denmark	(Denmark) Cecilie Leth-Nissen (a)	€50,000	LETAS	
5 Aug	Västerås Ladies Open	Orresta Golf Club	Sweden	(Sweden) Sara Ericsson (a)	€40,000	LETAS	
13 Aug	Big Green Egg Swedish Matchplay Championship	GolfUppsala	Sweden	(Germany) Patricia Isabel Schmidt	€40,000	LETAS	
27 Aug	Göteborg Ladies Open	Kungsbacka Golf Club	Sweden	(France) Nastasia Nadaud (a)	€40,000	LETAS	
2 Sep	Elite Hotels Open	Jönköping Golf Club	Sweden	(Czech Republic) Sára Kousková	€40,000	LETAS	

Swedish PGA Championship
Swedish Matchplay Championship

== Ranking ==
164 players from 28 countries appeared in the final Order of Merit. In addition to 19 European countries, players from New Zealand, Australia, Malaysia, Japan, South Korea, India, South Africa, Morocco and the United States participated.

Patricia Isabel Schmidt of Germany won the Order of Merit following victory at the Big Green Egg Swedish Matchplay Championship and two further top-10 finishes.

Rank	Player	Events	Result
1	(Germany) Patricia Isabel Schmidt	5	9,216
2	(Czech Republic) Sára Kousková	4	8,617
T3	(Denmark) Cecilie Leth-Nissen	1	8,000
T3	(Sweden) Meja Örtengren	1	8,000
5	(Sweden) Emma Thorngren	5	7,569

== See also ==
- 2022 Ladies European Tour
