= Lucrezia Colombotto Rosso =

Italian professional golfer

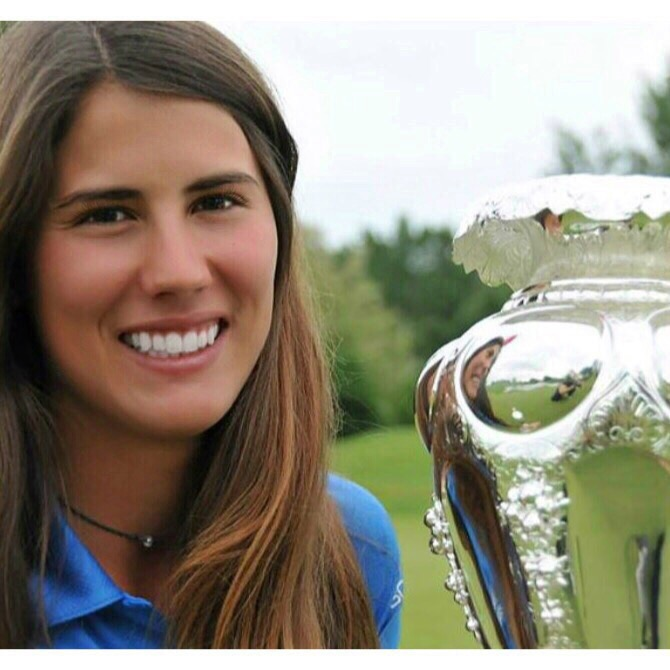

Personal information
- Nationality: Italy
- Born: 7 March 1996 (age 30) Turin, Italy
- Height: 1.63 m (5 ft 4 in)

Career
- Sport: Golf
- Turned professional: 2016
- Former tours: Ladies European Tour (2020–2021); LET Access Series (2017–2023)
- Professional wins: 1

Best results in LPGA major championships
- Chevron Championship: DNP
- Women's PGA C'ship: DNP
- U.S. Women's Open: CUT: 2020
- Women's British Open: DNP
- Evian Championship: DNP

Lucrezia Colombotto Rosso (born 7 March 1996) is an Italian professional golfer and former Ladies European Tour player. She competed at the 2020 Summer Olympics.

== Amateur career ==
Colombotto Rosso played for the Italian National Team and won silver at the 2014 European Girls' Team Championship in Slovakia. In 2015, she won the Città di Milano Trophy and won both the Italian Stroke-play and Match-play Championships, the first dual female champion in 26 years.

At the end of her amateur career, she was 48th in the World Amateur Golf Ranking, 20th in the European, and 2nd in the Italian.

== Professional career ==
Colombotto Rosso turned professional in late 2016 and joined the 2017 LET Access Series after playing in the Ladies European Tour Qualifying School in December. She played her first major at the 2019 U.S. Women's Open after she won the European qualifier at Buckinghamshire Golf Club, England.

In 2019, Colombotto Rosso was runner-up at the WPGA International Challenge in England, one stroke behind Manon De Roey and again at the Ribeira Sacra Patrimonio de la Humanidad International Ladies Open in Spain, two strokes behind Rachael Goodall of England. She finished third in the 2019 LET Access Series Ranking, earning a 2020 LET card.

Colombotto Rosso finished her rookie LET season in 24th place on the 2020 Costa del Sol Order of Merit, with at top finish of 4th at the Tipsport Czech Ladies Open, where she shot a career-low 66 in the opening round.

In June 2021, she qualified for the 2020 Olympics, taking place in Tokyo, Japan, in August 2021, along with Giulia Molinaro.

== Amateur wins ==
- 2012 GGL International Junior Open
- 2013 Sanremo Trophy, Pallavicino Trophy
- 2015 Italian Ladies Stroke Play Championship - Isa Goldschmid Trophy, Città di Milano Trofeo Gianni Albertinim, Italian Ladies Match Play - Giuseppe Silva Trophy

== Professional wins ==
=== LET Access Series wins (1) ===
No.	Date	Tournament	Winning score	To par	Margin of victory	Runner-up
1	2 April 2022	Terre Blanche Ladies Open	70-69-70=209	−7	Playoff	(Germany) Chiara Noja

== Team appearances ==
Amateur

- European Girls' Team Championship (representing Italy): 2013, 2014
- European Ladies' Team Championship (representing Italy): 2015, 2016
- Patsy Hankins Trophy (representing Europe): 2016
