= Santander Golf Tour Valencia =

Tournament information
- Location: Valencian Community, Spain
- Established: 2009
- Course: Mediterráneo Golf
- Par: 72
- Tours: Santander Golf Tour; LET Access Series
- Format: Stroke play
- Prize fund: €35,000 (LETAS)
- Month played: April

Current champion
- (Spain) Ana Peláez

The Santander Golf Tour Valencia is a women's professional golf tournament on Spain's Santander Golf Tour that has featured on the LET Access Series. It was first played in 2012 and is held in the Valencian Community, Spain.

== Winners ==
Year	Tour (Note: Several installments have been hosted under co-sanctioning agreement with the LET Access Series (LETAS) or Women's European Satellite Tour (WEST))	Winner(s)	Country	Score	Margin of victory	Runner(s)-up	Purse (€)	Venue	Ref
Santander Golf Tour Valencia
2026		Ana Peláez	Spain	–11 (65-68=133)	2 strokes	(Spain) Amaia Latorre		Mediterráneo Golf	
2025		Amaia Latorre	Spain	–3 (70-71=141)	8 strokes	(Spain) Marina Escobar		Parador de El Saler	
2024		María Herráez & Clara Young	Spain; Scotland	–14 (65-65=130)	1 stroke	(France) Céline Herbin & (Spain) Marta Pérez		El Bosque Golf	(Note: Team event)
2023		María Herráez	Spain	–3 (76-68=144)	2 strokes	(Spain) Elena Hualde		El Bosque Golf	
2022		Natalia Escuriola	Spain	–1 (76-67=143)	1 stroke	(Spain) Piti Martinez Bernal	20,000	Oliva Nova Golf	
2021		Almudena Blasco & Maho Hayakawa	Spain; Japan	−7 (67-70=137)	Playoff	(Spain) Rocío Tejedo (a) & (Spain) Natalia Fiel (a)	20,000	Oliva Nova Golf	(Note: Team event)
2020		Luna Sobrón	Spain	−4 (70-69-73=212)	2 strokes	(Spain) Ana Peláez (a)	20,000	Oliva Nova Golf	(Note: National championship (Campeonato de España Profesionales))
2019	LETAS	Manon De Roey	Belgium	−5 (68-71-72=211)	1 stroke	(Spain) Carmen Alonso	35,000	C.G. Escorpión	
2018		Silvia Bañón	Spain	−8 (66-70=138)	4 strokes	(Spain) Natasha Fear	20,000	C.G. Escorpión	
Santander Golf Tour El Saler
2017	LETAS	Emma Nilsson	Sweden	−6 (69-70-71=210)	1 stroke	(Iceland) Valdis Thora Jonsdottir	35,000	Parador de El Saler	
2016		Laura Cabanillas	Spain	+1 (145)	Playoff	(Spain) Marta Sanz	18,000	Parador de El Saler	
2013–15: No tournament
Banesto Tour Valencia
2012	LETAS	Holly Clyburn	England	−3 (67-71-75=213)	Playoff	(Spain) Carmen Alonso	20,000	C.G. Escorpion	
2011	WEST	Raquel Carriedo	Spain	−11 (67-69-69=205)	1 stroke	(Spain) Adriana Zwanck	30,000	C.G. Villaitana	
2010		Kaisa Ruuttila	Finland	138 (–6)	Playoff	(Spain) María Hernández	20,000	C.G. Villaitana	
2009		Nathalie David-Mila	France	–4 (72-68=140)	1 stroke	(France) Celine Herbin (Spain) Mariana Macías	20,000	El Bosque Golf	
