= Charlotte Laffar =

English professional golfer (born 1992)

Personal information
- Nationality: England
- Born: 9 August 1992 (age 34) Chelmsford, England
- Height: 158 cm (5 ft 2 in)

Career
- Sport: Golf
- Turned professional: 2013
- Current tour: Ladies European Tour (joined 2014)
- Former tour: LET Access Series (joined 2015)
- Professional wins: 1

Best results in LPGA major championships
- Chevron Championship: DNP
- Women's PGA C'ship: DNP
- U.S. Women's Open: DNP
- Women's British Open: CUT: 2012, 2019, 2020
- Evian Championship: DNP

Charlotte Laffar (née Thompson, born 9 August 1992) is an English professional golfer and Ladies European Tour player. She was runner-up at the 2019 Czech Ladies Open.

== Amateur career ==
In 2012, Laffar was runner-up at the English Women's Open Amateur Stroke Play Championship, 3rd at the English Open Mid-Amateur Championship, and tied 6th at the French International Ladies Amateur Championship.

== Professional career ==
Laffar turned professional in 2013 and joined the 2014 Ladies European Tour (LET) after securing a card at Q-School. She then spent three seasons on the LET Access Series, where she was runner-up at the 2016 Drøbak Ladies Open in Norway after losing a playoff to María Parra, and the 2017 Ladies Finnish Open, where she finished two strokes behind Ursula Wikström.

Back on the LET after graduating from the 2017 LET Access Series, she recorded a top-10 finish at the 2018 Australian Ladies Classic – Bonville, and was runner-up at the 2019 Czech Ladies Open. She qualified for the 2019 Women's British Open at Woburn Golf Club by virtue of being top-25 on the LET Order of Merit. She tied for 3rd at the 2019 La Reserva de Sotogrande Invitational, after holding the first-round lead.

After finishing tied 6th at the 2020 Ladies Open de France, Laffar took an almost five year break to give birth to two boys. When she returned in 2025, she held the first round lead at the Women's Scottish Open, an LET and LPGA Tour co-sanctioned event, after an opening round of 66 at Dundonald Links.

== Professional wins (1) ==
=== Other wins (1) ===
- 2026 Rose Ladies Series – Buckinghamshire

== Results in LPGA majors ==
Tournament	2012	2013	2014	2015	2016	2017	2018	2019	2020
Chevron Championship									
U.S. Women's Open									
Women's PGA Championship									
Women's British Open	CUT							CUT	CUT
The Evian Championship									

Did not play

CUT = missed the half-way cut
