= Patricia Isabel Schmidt =

German professional golfer

Personal information
- Nationality: Germany
- Born: 1 September 1995 (age 31) Göppingen, Germany
- Height: 5 ft 7 in (1.70 m)

Career
- Sport: Golf
- Turned professional: 2021
- Current tour: Ladies European Tour (joined 2023)
- Former tour: LET Access Series (joined 2021)
- Professional wins: 3

Number of wins by tour
- Ladies European Tour: 1
- Other: 2

Best results in LPGA major championships
- Chevron Championship: DNP
- Women's PGA C'ship: DNP
- U.S. Women's Open: DNP
- Women's British Open: CUT: 2023, 2024
- Evian Championship: DNP

Achievements and awards
- Nordic Golf Tour Order of Merit: 2022

Patricia Isabel Schmidt (born 1 September 1995) is a German professional golfer who plays on the Ladies European Tour. She won the 2023 Belgian Ladies Open.

== Amateur career ==
Schmidt won the 2017 Hetzenhof Open in Baden-Württemberg. In 2018, she finished 3rd at the Luxembourg International Amateur Championship.

== Professional career ==
Schmidt turned professional in 2021 and joined the LET Access Series. In 2022, she had two runner-up finishes at the Flumserberg Ladies Open and at the Trust Golf Links Series – Musselburgh, before winning the Big Green Egg Swedish Matchplay Championship. She also won the Nordic Golf Tour Order of Merit on the basis of her win and two further top-10 finishes.

Schmidt finished fourth on the 2022 LET Access Series Order of Merit to secure her LET card for the 2023 Ladies European Tour.

In 2023, Schmidt was runner-up in the team event at Aramco Team Series – Singapore playing with Pauline Roussin and Nuria Iturrioz. In May, she won the Belgian Ladies Open at Naxhelet Golf Club, two strokes ahead of María Hernández and Chiara Noja.

== Professional wins (3) ==
=== Ladies European Tour wins (1) ===
No.	Date	Tournament	Winning score	To par	Margin of victory	Runners-up
1	28 May 2023	Belgian Ladies Open	71-68-66=205	−11	2 strokes	(Spain) María Hernández (Germany) Chiara Noja

=== LET Access Series wins (2) ===
No.	Date	Tournament	Winning score	To par	Margin of victory	Runner-up
1	12 Aug 2022	Big Green Egg Swedish Matchplay Championship	4 and 2			(Netherlands) Lauren Holmey
2	9 Aug 2024	Ahlsell Trophy	69-67-70=206	−10	2 strokes	(Italy) Alessia Nobilio (a)
