= Elina Nummenpää =

Finnish professional golfer (born 1983)

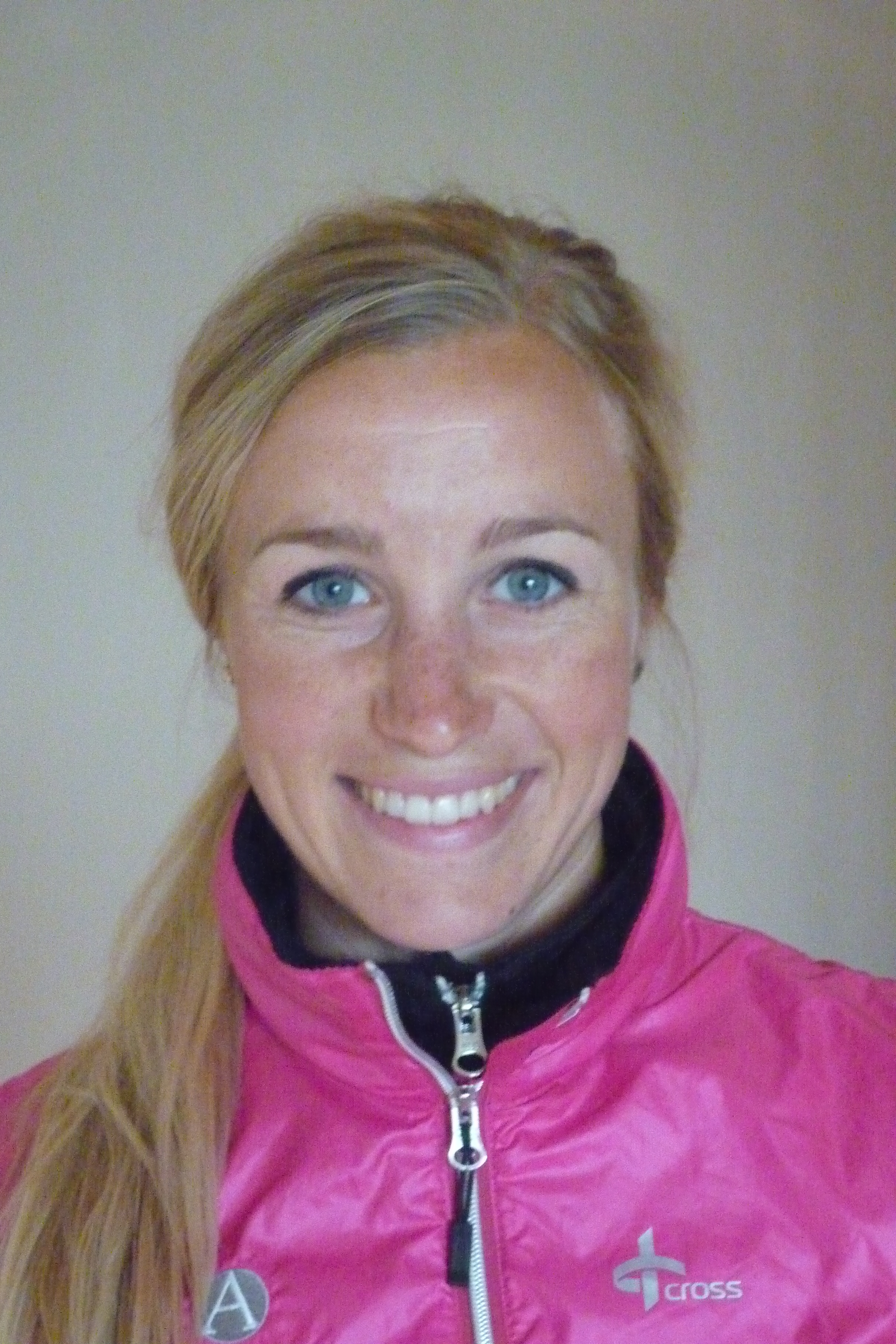
- Nummenpää in 2013

Personal information
- Nationality: Finland
- Born: 7 September 1983 (age 43) Turku, Finland
- Height: 5 ft 3 in (160 cm)

Career
- Sport: Golf
- Turned professional: 2011
- Current tour: LET (joined 2013)
- Former tours: LET Access Series (joined 2012); Swedish Golf Tour (joined 2011)
- Professional wins: 1

Elina Nummenpää (born 7 September 1983) is a Finnish professional golfer who plays on the Ladies European Tour (LET).

== Career ==
Nummenpää was a member of the Finnish National Team and represented her country four times at the European Ladies' Team Championship between 2007 and 2010. Their best finish was 6th in 2007, after Finland fell to Sweden in the quarter finals.

Nummenpää won the 2009 Finnish Amateur Championship and turned professional in 2011. She joined the Swedish Golf Tour where she recorded two top-10 finishes in her rookie season.

In 2012, Nummenpää joined the LET Access Series, where her best finish was a tie for 4th at the Crete Ladies Open.

She finished T20 at Lalla Aicha Tour School and joined the 2013 Ladies European Tour, with her best result her rookie season a tie for 8th at the Hero Women's Indian Open.

In 2018, she won the Santander Golf Tour Málaga, one stroke ahead of Noemí Jiménez. She finished tied fourth in the team event of the 2021 Aramco Team Series – Jeddah, teamed with Carmen Alonso and Manon De Roey.

Nummenpää was in contention at the 2022 Skaftö Open, and held the overnight lead together with Lisa Pettersson after they carded opening round scores of 63. She also held the outright lead during parts of the final round, but eventually had to settle for a tie for third place behind Linn Grant and Lisa Pettersson, alongside Maja Stark.

== Amateur wins ==
- 2009 Finnish Amateur Championship

== Professional wins (1) ==
=== Santander Golf Tour wins (1) ===
No.	Date	Tournament	Winning score	Margin of victory	Runner-up	Ref
1	27 Jul 2020	Santander Golf Tour Málaga	−5 (66-73=139)	1 stroke	(Spain) Noemí Jiménez	

== Team appearances ==
Amateur

- European Ladies' Team Championship (representing Finland): 2007, 2008, 2009, 2010
