= Agathe Laisné =

French professional golfer (born 1999)

Personal information
- Nationality: France
- Born: 26 May 1999 (age 27) Paris, France
- Height: 5 ft 8 in (1.73 m)

Career
- Sport: Golf
- College: University of Texas
- Turned professional: 2021
- Current tour: Ladies European Tour (joined 2025)
- Former tours: LPGA Tour (joined 2022); Epson Tour (joined 2023)
- Professional wins: 5

Number of wins by tour
- Ladies European Tour: 2
- WPGA Tour of Australasia: 1
- Epson Tour: 1
- Other: 2

Best results in LPGA major championships
- Chevron Championship: DNP
- Women's PGA C'ship: CUT: 2022
- U.S. Women's Open: CUT: 2020, 2024
- Women's British Open: CUT: 2018, 2026
- Evian Championship: T69: 2022

Achievements and awards
- Big 12 Player of the Year: 2019

Agathe Laisné (born 26 May 1999) is a French professional golfer who has played on the LPGA Tour and Ladies European Tour. She won the 2017 European Ladies Amateur and the 2023 Florida's Natural Charity Classic.

== Amateur career ==
Laisné was born in Paris and played for the French National Team since the age of 13. She represented France at the 2015 Junior Golf World Cup, the Espirito Santo Trophy in 2016 and 2018, the European Ladies' Team Championship four times and the European Girls' Team Championship three times, winning the event in 2014.

She also represented Europe at the Junior Vagliano Trophy and the Junior Solheim Cup in 2015.

Laisné excelled individually and in 2013 won the Belgian International Under 18, in 2014 the Championnat de France des Jeunes Minimes (Girls 15-16), Total International Juniors of Belgium, and the European Ladies Club Trophy. In 2015 she tied for second at the 2015 Orange Bowl and in 2016 she won the Coupe Didier Illouz. She received one of the four invitations for the 2015 Evian Championship and again for the 2017 Evian Championship.

In 2017 she won the European Ladies Amateur by one stroke ahead of Albane Valenzuela, and two strokes ahead of Morgane Metraux, to also qualify for the 2018 Women's British Open. In 2020 she won both the Grand Prix du Medoc and Grand Prix de Saint Germain.

Laisné attended the University of Texas at Austin 2017–2021 where she majored in finance and played with Texas Longhorns women's golf. She won the 2019 Big 12 Conference Championship, becoming the third person in University of Texas history to claim the Big 12 title. She was an Arnold Palmer Cup International team member in 2019 and 2021.

After a pair of victories in the LET Access Series, the Santander Golf Tour Lauro in Spain and Lavaux Ladies Open in Switzerland, Laisné surged to number 13 in the Women's World Amateur Golf Ranking, to qualify for the 2020 U.S. Women's Open. She finished third at the 2020 European Ladies Amateur, one stroke away from playoff.

== Professional career ==
Laisné turned professional in October 2021. She earned her card for the 2022 LPGA Tour through qualifying school. In her rookie season, she made 3 cuts in 18 starts with a best finish of T16 at the Palos Verdes Championship. She also made her first cut in a major, at the 2022 Evian Championship.

Relegated to the Epson Tour for 2023, Laisné won the Florida's Natural Charity Classic, the first event of the season. She shot a bogey-free 66 to come from six shots back to join a playoff with Jillian Hollis and Kiira Riihijärvi, and won with a birdie on the first playoff hole.

Laisné earned her card for the 2025 Ladies European Tour at Q-School where she tied for 19th. She secured her first victory at the 2026 Ford Women's NSW Open.

== Amateur wins ==
- 2013 Belgian International Under 18
- 2014 Championnat de France des Jeunes Minimes (Girls 15-16), Total International Juniors of Belgium, European Ladies Club Trophy
- 2016 Coupe Didier Illouz
- 2017 European Ladies Amateur
- 2019 Big 12 Championship (individual)
- 2020 Grand Prix du Medoc, Grand Prix de Saint Germain

== Professional wins (5) ==
=== Ladies European Tour wins (2) ===
No.	Date	Tournament	Winning score	To par	Margin of victory	Runners-up
1	1 Mar 2026	Ford Women's NSW Open^	72-67-64-65=268	−16	1 stroke	(Thailand) April Angurasaranee (South Korea) Oh Soo-min
2	19 Apr 2026	Joburg Ladies Open^^	66-73-65-69=273	−19	Playoff	(Australia) Kirsten Rudgeley (South Africa) Casandra Alexander

^ Co-sanctioned with the WPGA Tour of Australasia

^^ Co-sanctioned with the Sunshine Ladies Tour

Ladies European Tour playoff record (1–0)

No.	Year	Tournament	Opponents	Result
1	2026	Joburg Ladies Open	(Australia) Kirsten Rudgeley (South Africa) Casandra Alexander	Won with birdie on fifth extra hole. Alexander eliminated by birdie on first extra hole.

=== Epson Tour wins (1) ===
No.	Date	Tournament	Winning score	To par	Margin of victory	Runners-up
1	5 Mar 2023	Florida's Natural Charity Classic	73-68-66=207	−9	Playoff	(United States) Jillian Hollis (Finland) Kiira Riihijärvi

=== LET Access Series wins (2) ===
No.	Date	Tournament	Winning score	To par	Margin of victory	Runner(s)-up	Ref
1	25 Sep 2020	Lavaux Ladies Open (as an amateur)	71-68-68=207	−9	Playoff	(Slovenia) Pia Babnik (France) Agathe Sauzon	
2	22 Oct 2020	Santander Golf Tour Lauro (as an amateur)	67-70=137	−7	5 strokes	(Finland) Tiia Koivisto	

== Results in LPGA majors ==
Results not in chronological order.

Tournament	2015	2016	2017	2018	2019	2020	2021	2022	2023	2024
Chevron Championship										
U.S. Women's Open						CUT				CUT
Women's PGA Championship								CUT		
The Evian Championship	CUT		CUT			NT		T69		
Women's British Open				CUT						

Tournament	2025	2026
Chevron Championship		
U.S. Women's Open		
Women's PGA Championship		
The Evian Championship		CUT
Women's British Open		CUT

Did not play

CUT = missed the half-way cut
NT = no tournament
"T" = tied

== Team appearances ==
Amateur

- Junior Vagliano Trophy (representing the Continent of Europe): 2015 (winners)
- Junior Solheim Cup (representing Europe): 2015
- Toyota Junior Golf World Cup (representing France): 2015
- Espirito Santo Trophy (representing France): 2016, 2018
- European Girls' Team Championship (representing France): 2014 (winners), 2015, 2017
- European Ladies' Team Championship (representing France): 2016, 2018, 2020, 2021
- Arnold Palmer Cup (representing the International team): 2019 (winners), 2021
