= Ana Peláez =

Spanish professional golfer (born 1998)

Personal information
- Full name: Ana Peláez Triviño
- Nationality: Spain
- Born: 22 March 1998 (age 28) Málaga, Spain
- Height: 5 ft 1 in (155 cm)

Career
- Sport: Golf
- College: University of South Carolina
- Turned professional: 2021
- Current tour: Ladies European Tour (joined 2022)
- Former tour: LPGA Tour (2024)
- Professional wins: 6

Number of wins by tour
- Ladies European Tour: 2
- Other: 4

Best results in LPGA major championships
- Chevron Championship: DNP
- Women's PGA C'ship: DNP
- U.S. Women's Open: CUT: 2021
- Women's British Open: CUT: 2022, 2023, 2024, 2026
- Evian Championship: CUT: 2023, 2024

Ana Peláez Triviño (born 22 March 1998) is a Spanish professional golfer and Ladies European Tour player. She won the 2022 Madrid Ladies Open and 2026 Aramco China Championship.

== Amateur career ==
Peláez was born in Málaga in 1998 and enjoyed an impressive amateur career, climbing to 11th spot in the World Amateur Golf Rankings.

After a runner-up finish in 2014, she won the 2015 Annika Invitational Europe. She reached the semifinals of the 2015 Girls Amateur Championship. Both were qualifying events for the Junior Solheim Cup, where she made the team and represented Europe in 2015. In 2016, she was runner-up at the French International Lady Juniors Amateur Championship. With the Spanish National Team, she won 2015 European Girls' Team Championship, and appeared in the European Ladies' Team Championship five years consecutively between 2017 and 2021, with best finish a silver behind Sweden in 2019. She finished 3rd at the Junior Golf World Cup in Japan together with Marta Pérez Sanmartin and María Parra.

Peláez entered the University of South Carolina in 2016. She earned two All-America honors as a member of the South Carolina Gamecocks women's golf team and recorded the fourth best scoring average in program history (73.80). She earned medalist honors at the 2017 NCAA Columbus Regional as a freshman. She crowned her college career with a selection to play in the 2021 Arnold Palmer Cup.

In 2020, Peláez returned to action following the pandemic with five top-three finishes in amateur events in Spain, including a second place in the Campeonato De Espana Profesionales Femenino. She recorded a T13 finish at the European Ladies Amateur Championship in Slovenia and won the Madrid event on the Santander Golf Tour. She finished the year with a solo third in the Open de España Femenino, a Ladies European Tour event.

Peláez started 2021 with a five-stroke victory at the Copa Andalucia in her native Spain, successfully defending her 2020 title. She finished 12th at the Augusta National Women's Amateur and won the sectional qualifying at Druid Hills GC in Atlanta, Georgia for the 2021 U.S. Women's Open, her first major.

== Professional career ==
Peláez turned professional on the eve of the Aramco Team Series – Sotogrande in July 2021, where she made the cut and finished in a tie for 42nd. She finished in a tie for 83rd at LET Q-School in December, for a very limited status on the LET in 2022. She received an invitation to play in the Madrid Ladies Open, and secured a full LET card through victory. On her way to win in her debut tournament as a member, she shot a course record nine-under-par 63 in the penultimate round. She finished 23-under-par, six strokes clear of Linnea Ström in second.

In her rookie season, Peláez also finished runner-up at the Aramco Team Series – Sotogrande behind winner Nelly Korda, and finished 5th in the season ranking. She was runner-up as LET Rookie of the Year behind Linn Grant.

In 2023, Peláez recorded runner-up finishes at the Joburg Ladies Open, Investec South African Women's Open and Helsingborg Open, to finish the season fifth on the 2023 Ladies European Tour Order of Merit. She climbed into the top-100 of the Women's World Golf Rankings for the first time.

Peláez finished T27 at LPGA Q-Series to earn LPGA Tour membership for 2024. In her rookie season, she made 4 cuts in 12 starts. She also made 15 starts on the LET, where she recorded a tie for 3rd at the Magical Kenya Ladies Open, a tie for 4th at Aramco Team Series – Tampa, and a solo 4th at the La Sella Open.

In 2025, her best finish was a tie for 3rd at the Tenerife Women's Open, before defending her title at the Santander Campeonato de España de Profesionales Femenino.

In 2026, Peláez recorded three top-10 finishes before she shot a hole-in-one in a bogey-free final round of 64 (−9) to win the Aramco China Championship at Mission Hills, for her second LET title.

== Amateur wins ==
- 2013 Copa Andalucia
- 2015 Annika Invitational Europe
- 2016 Campeonato de Madrid
- 2017 NCAA Columbus Regional
- 2020 Copa Andalucia
- 2021 Copa Andalucia

== Professional wins (6) ==
=== Ladies European Tour wins (2) ===
No.	Date	Tournament	Winning score	To par	Margin of victory	Runner-up
1	8 May 2022	Madrid Ladies Open	69-67-63-66=265	−23	6 strokes	(Sweden) Linnea Ström
2	8 Nov 2026	Aramco China Championship^	69-66-73-64=272	−20	3 strokes	(England) Mimi Rhodes

^ Co-sanctioned with the China LPGA Tour

=== Santander Golf Tour wins (4) ===
No.	Date	Tournament	Winning score	To par	Margin of victory	Runner-up	Ref
1	28 Oct 2020	Santander Golf Tour Madrid (as an amateur)	69-66=135	−9	1 stroke	(Spain) Carolina López-Chacarra (a)	
2	4 Dec 2024	Santander Golf Tour Málaga (Campeonato de España)	66-69-67=202	−14	6 strokes	(Spain) Nuria Iturrioz	
3	21 Nov 2025	Santander Golf Tour Cádiz (Campeonato de España)	68-71-71=210	−6	7 strokes	(Spain) María Parra	
4	28 Mar 2026	Santander Golf Tour Valencia	65-68=133	−11	2 strokes	(Spain) Amaia Latorre	

== Results in LPGA majors ==
Tournament	2021	2022	2023	2024	2025	2026
Chevron Championship						
U.S. Women's Open	CUT					
Women's PGA Championship						
The Evian Championship			CUT	CUT		
Women's British Open		CUT	CUT	CUT		CUT

Did not play

CUT = missed the half-way cut

== Team appearances ==
Amateur

- Junior Solheim Cup (representing Europe): 2015
- Junior Golf World Cup (representing Spain): 2016
- European Girls' Team Championship (representing Spain): 2015 (winners), 2016
- European Ladies' Team Championship (representing Spain): 2017, 2018, 2019, 2020, 2021
- Arnold Palmer Cup (representing the International team): 2021
