= Tereza Melecká =

Czech professional golfer

Personal information
- Full name: Tereza Kazár Melecká
- Nationality: Czech Republic
- Born: 17 June 1998 (age 28) Šternberk, Czech Republic
- Spouse: Tomáš Kazár (m. 2026)

Career
- Sport: Golf
- College: East Tennessee State University
- Turned professional: 2021
- Current tour: Ladies European Tour (joined 2022)

Achievements and awards
- Southern Conference Player of the Year: 2021

Tereza Kazár Melecká (born 17 June 1998) is a Czech professional golfer and Ladies European Tour player. In 2022, she won the Aramco Team Series – Sotogrande team event together with Jessica Korda and Noora Komulainen, and the Aramco Team Series – Jeddah team event together with Nicole Garcia and Casandra Alexander.

== Early life and amateur career ==
Melecká was born in Šternberk and became a member of the Czech National Team, representing her country in two European Girls' Team Championship and five consecutive European Ladies' Team Championships between 2015 and 2021.

In 2017, she won the Czech National Match Play Championship.

Melecká enrolled at East Tennessee State University in 2017 and joined the East Tennessee State Buccaneers women's golf team, where she won six tournaments and was Southern Conference Player of the Year in 2021. She graduated in May 2021 with a degree in Business Marketing.

Melecká was runner up at the Czech Ladies Challenge in 2018 and 2019, and the Montauban Ladies Open in 2021. She was the best Czech player on the World Amateur Golf Rankings in 2020 and her best position was 47th.

== Professional career ==
Melecká turned professional in 2021 and earned LET status at Q-School in December.

In her rookie season, 2022, she won the Aramco Team Series – Sotogrande team event in Spain together with Jessica Korda, Noora Komulainen and polo player Malcolm Borwick, one stroke ahead of a team led by Pauline Roussin-Bouchard. She also won the Aramco Team Series – Jeddah team event, together with Nicole Garcia and Casandra Alexander following a playoff with a team led by Christine Wolf.

Melecká opened the 2024 season with a tie for 5th at the Joburg Ladies Open in South Africa.

== Personal life ==
Melecká married Czech footballer Tomáš Kazár in September 2026.

== Amateur wins ==
- 2016 Faldo Series Slovakia Championship
- 2017 Czech National Match Play Championship, Johnie Imes Invitational
- 2019 Las Vegas Collegiate Showdown
- 2020 River Landing Classic
- 2021 Chattanooga Classic, Ron Moore Invitational, Grandover Fall Classic

== Team appearances ==
Amateur

- European Girls' Team Championship (representing Czech Republic): 2015, 2016
- European Ladies' Team Championship (representing Czech Republic): 2017, 2018, 2019, 2020, 2021
