= Santander Golf Tour Málaga =

Tournament information
- Location: Málaga, Spain
- Established: 2018
- Course: Lauro Golf
- Par: 72
- Tour(s): Santander Golf Tour; LET Access Series
- Format: Stroke play
- Prize fund: €40,000
- Month played: November

Current champion
- (Spain) Ana Peláez

The Santander Golf Tour Málaga is a women's professional golf tournament on Spain's Santander Golf Tour that has featured on the LET Access Series. It was first played in 2018 and is held in Málaga, Spain.

The 2023 and 2024 installments doubled as the Campeonato de España, the Spanish National Championship, which rotates between events on the tour.

== Winners ==
| Year | Tour (Note: Several installments have been hosted under co-sanctioning agreement with the LET Access Series (LETAS)) | Winner | Country | Score | Margin of victory | Runner(s)-up | Purse (€) | Venue | Ref |
Santander Golf Tour Málaga
| 2024 | | Ana Peláez | Spain | −14 (66-69-67=202) | 6 strokes | (Spain) Nuria Iturrioz | 20,000 | Lauro Golf | (Note: Event doubled as the Campeonato de España, the Spanish National Championship) |
| 2023 | | Nuria Iturrioz (2) | Spain | −6 (72-69-69=210) | 1 stroke | (Spain) Maria Parra | 20,000 | Lauro Golf | |
| 2022 | LETAS | Sára Kousková | Czech Republic | −5 (74-70-67=211) | 1 stroke | (Italy) Virginia Elena Carta | 40,000 | Torrequebrada | |
| 2021 | | Carla Bernat (a) | Spain | −5 (69-70=139) | 4 strokes | (Spain) Natasha Fear | 20,000 | Lauro Golf | |
Santander Golf Tour Lauro
| 2020 | LETAS | Agathe Laisné (a) | France | −7 (67-70=137) (Note: Weather-shortened to 36 holes) | 1 stroke | (Finland) Tiia Koivisto | 35,000 | Lauro Golf | |
Santander Golf Tour Málaga
| 2019 | | Nuria Iturrioz | Spain | −4 (77-63=140) | Playoff | (Spain) María Parra | 20,000 | Lauro Golf | |
| 2018 | | Elina Nummenpää | Finland | −5 (66-73=139) | 1 stroke | (Spain) Noemí Jiménez | 20,000 | Mijas Golf | |
