= Czech Ladies Challenge =

Golf tournament in the Czech Republic

Tournament information
- Location: Prague, Czech Republic
- Established: 2014
- Course: Panorama Golf Resort
- Par: 72
- Tour: LET Access Series
- Format: 54-hole Stroke play
- Prize fund: €42,500
- Month played: June

Tournament record score
- Aggregate: 202 Sára Kousková
- To par: –14 as above

Current champion
- (Iceland) Hulda Gestsdóttir

The Czech Ladies Challenge is a women's professional golf tournament on the LET Access Series, held in the Czech Republic.

The event was first played in 2014 at Golf Park Plzeň-Dýšina in the city of Plzeň, 90 km west of Prague, also host to the LET's Sberbank Golf Masters, before moving closer to Prague.

It has been the only Czech event on the LET Access Series schedule except in 2019 when the Czech Ladies Open was played as a dual-ranking event with the Ladies European Tour.

== Winners ==
Year	Venue	Winner	Country	Score	Margin of victory	Runner(s)-up	Ref
Raiffeisen Czech Ladies Challenge
2026	Panorama Golf Resort	Hulda Gestsdóttir	Iceland	E (72-72-72=216)	1 stroke	(Switzerland) Natalie Armbruester	
Amundi Czech Ladies Challenge
2025	Panorama Golf Resort	Alice Kong (a)	France	−1 (74-72-71=215)	Playoff	(Australia) Justice Bosio (England) Gemma Clews (Austria) Katharina Muehlbauer	
2024	Panorama Golf Resort	Helen Briem (a)	Germany	−3 (72-68-73=213)	1 stroke	(Netherlands) Nikki Hofstede	
2023	Panorama Golf Resort	Marta Martín	Spain	−1 (69-74-72=215)	1 stroke	(England) Gemma Clews	
2022	Prague City Golf	Chiara Noja	Germany	−12 (65-68-71=204)	9 strokes	(Czech Republic) Sára Kousková	
2021	Golf Resort Konopiště	Sára Kousková (a)	Czech Republic	−14 (64-67-71=202)	8 strokes	(Russia) Nina Pegova	
2020	Prague City Golf	Tiia Koivisto	Finland	−9 (68-71-68=207)	2 strokes	(England) Cara Gainer	
2019	Golf Resort Konopiště	Sanna Nuutinen	Finland	−7 (72-69-68=209)	1 stroke	(Sweden) Julia Engström (Czech Republic) Tereza Melecka (a) (Switzerland) Caroline Rominger	
AXA Czech Ladies Challenge
2018	Golf Resort Konopiště	Carmen Alonso	Spain	−11 (70-66-69=205)	3 strokes	(England) Inci Mehmet (Czech Republic) Tereza Melecka (a)	
Foxconn Czech Ladies Challenge
2017	Casa Serena Golf Club	Lucie Andre	France	−5 (69-68=137)	Playoff	(Austria) Nina Muehl (France) Agathe Sauzon	
2015–2016: No tournament
Pilsen Golf Challenge
2014	Golf Park Plzeň-Dýšina	Emma Nilsson	Sweden	−10 (66-70-70=206)	Playoff	(France) Melodie Bourdy	

== See also ==
- Czech Ladies Open
