= Jana Melichová =

Czech professional golfer

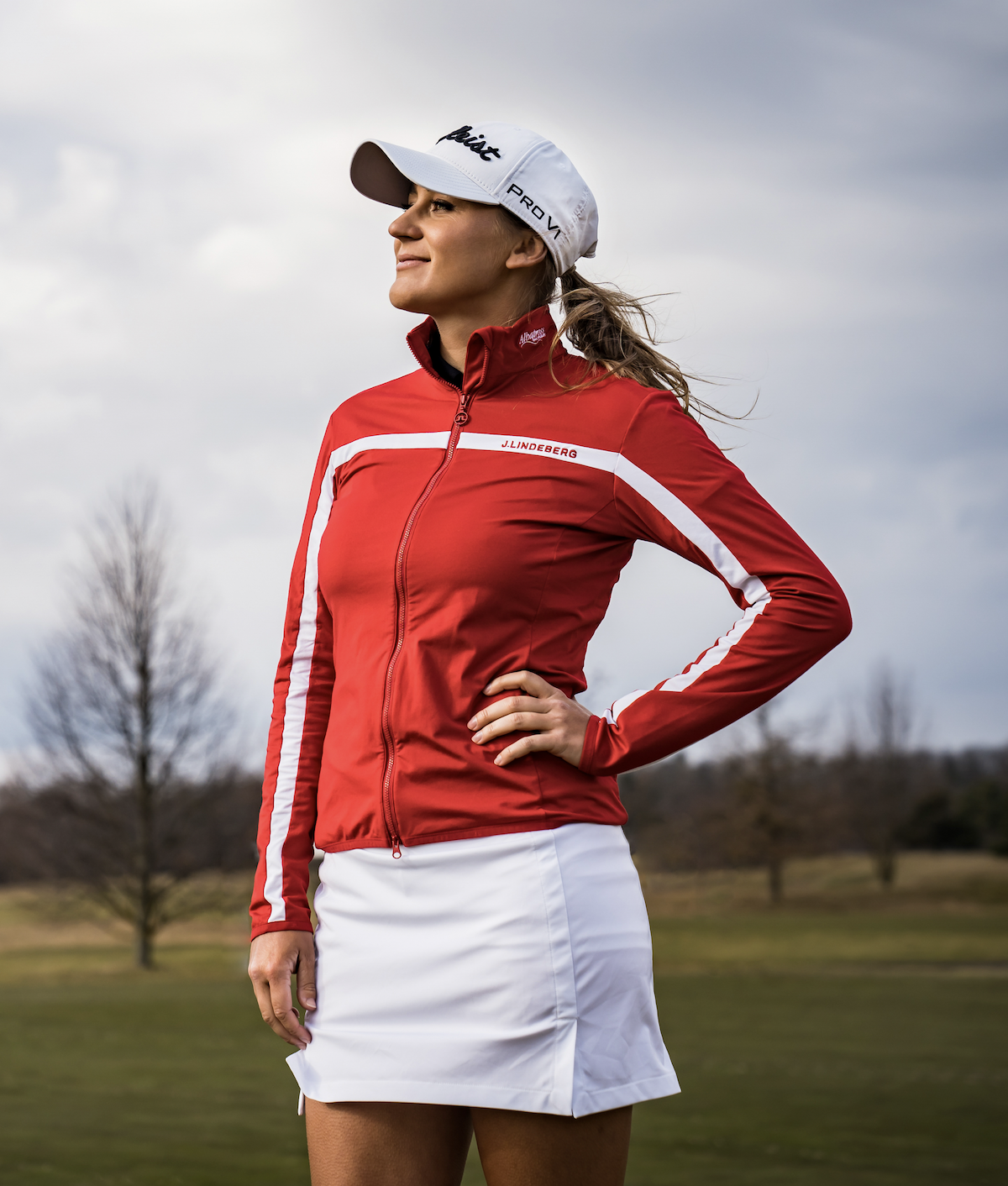

Personal information
- Nationality: Czech Republic
- Born: 22 October 1997 (age 29) Prague, Czech Republic
- Height: 5 ft 7 in (170 cm)

Career
- Sport: Golf
- College: Old Dominion University
- Turned professional: 2022
- Current tour: Ladies European Tour (joined 2022)
- Professional wins: 2

Number of wins by tour
- Ladies European Tour: 2

Best results in LPGA major championships
- Chevron Championship: DNP
- Women's PGA C'ship: DNP
- U.S. Women's Open: DNP
- Women's British Open: CUT: 2022, 2024
- Evian Championship: DNP

Achievements and awards
- Conference USA Freshman of the Year: 2019
- WGCA All-American: 2022

Jana Melichová (born 22 October 1997) is a Czech professional golfer who plays on the Ladies European Tour. She won the 2022 Tipsport Czech Ladies Open and 2024 Dutch Ladies Open.

== Early life and amateur career ==
Melichová was born in Prague and became a member of the Czech National Team in 2013, representing her country in six consecutive European Ladies' Team Championships between 2016 and 2021.

In 2014, she won the Czech Amateur Tour Final and in 2018 she won both the Czech National Match Play Championship and the Czech International Amateur Championship.

Melichová enrolled at Old Dominion University (ODU) in 2018 and joined the Old Dominion Lady Monarchs golf team. She graduated in May 2022 with a degree in International Business. During her collegiate career at ODU, Melichová made an immediate impact by breaking school program and personal records in her very first tournament. She was awarded Freshman of the Year in 2019.

Melichová achieved one individual tournament victory and secured top-three finishes on eight occasions. She consistently held the first position on the ODU women’s golf team, contributing to the best team results in the program's history. As a senior, she qualified as an individual for the NCAA Regional Championship and advanced to the NCAA Championship.

At the NCAA Championship, Melichová achieved a 13th-place finish and earned All-American honors.

== Professional career ==
In June 2022, Melichová achieved a significant milestone by winning the Tipsport Czech Ladies Open, becoming the second Czech golfer to win on the Ladies European Tour (LET), following Klára Davidson Spilková's victory in 2017. Her victory was historic as she secured it while still an amateur, earning her full LET membership.

In 2023, she was runner-up in the team event at the Aramco Team Series – Hong Kong teamed with Trichat Cheenglab and Christine Wolf.

Melichová’s second LET victory came at the 2024 Dutch Ladies Open. Melichová came from six shots behind leader Kim Métraux ahead of the final round to win by a stroke. She dedicated the victory to her mother, who died in 2022, and would have celebrated her 60th birthday on the first day of the tournament. The triumph earned her full playing status on the LET for the 2025 and 2026 seasons.

In the history of Czech women's golf, only three players have won on the LET: Spilková, Kristýna Napoleaová, and Melichová. Notably, Melichová and Spilková are the only two Czech players to have secured two victories each. While Spilková won in 2017 and 2022, Melichová’s victories came in 2022 and 2024.

== Amateur wins ==
- 2014 Czech Amateur Tour Final
- 2016 Czech Amateur Tour 4, Czech International Junior U18 & 21 Championship, Faldo Series Czech Championship
- 2017 Czech Amateur Tour 3, Raiffeisenbank President Masters
- 2018 Czech Amateur Tour 2, Czech National Match Play Championship, Czech International Amateur Championship
- 2020 Maryb S. Kauth Invitational, SLR Academy Invitational

== Professional wins (2) ==
=== Ladies European Tour wins (2) ===
No.	Date	Tournament	Winning score	To par	Margin of victory	Runner(s)-up
1	26 Jun 2022	Tipsport Czech Ladies Open (as an amateur)	68-65-69=202	−14	1 stroke	(Denmark) Nicole Broch Estrup (Czech Republic) Klára Spilková
2	21 Jul 2024	Dutch Ladies Open	70-68-67=205	−11	1 stroke	(Switzerland) Kim Métraux

== Team appearances ==
Amateur

- European Girls' Team Championship (representing Czech Republic): 2014, 2015
- European Ladies' Team Championship (representing Czech Republic): 2016, 2017, 2018, 2019, 2020, 2021
