= Ragga Kristinsdóttir =

Icelandic professional golfer

Personal information
- Full name: Ragnhildur Kristinsdóttir
- Nationality: Iceland
- Born: 1997 (age 28–29) Reykjavík, Iceland
- Height: 173 cm (5 ft 8 in)

Career
- Sport: Golf
- College: Eastern Kentucky University
- Turned professional: 2023
- Current tour: LET Access Series (joined 2023)
- Professional wins: 1

Achievements and awards
- Icelandic Junior Tour Order of Merit winner: 2010, 2011, 2012, 2013
- Icelandic Tour Order of Merit winner: 2016
- Ohio Valley Conference Freshman of the Year: 2018
- Atlantic Sun Conference Golfer of the Year: 2022
- Nordic Golf Tour Order of Merit winner: 2025

Ragnhildur "Ragga" Kristinsdóttir (born 1997) is an Icelandic professional golfer. She was the stroke play medalist at the 2021 Women's Amateur Championship. In 2025 she became the first Icelandic woman to win an individual title on a professional golf tour.

== Early life and family ==
Kristinsdóttir was born in Reykjavík and started playing golf with her brothers at the age of 6. Her brother Ögmundur is a professional footballer and appeared for Iceland in the UEFA Euro 2016. In addition to her golf, Kristinsdóttir competed in handball, and is a three-time Icelandic handball team champion and won three Icelandic National Team Cup Championships.

== Amateur career ==
Kristinsdóttir was a member of the Icelandic national team 2013–2022 and represented Iceland at the European Ladies' Team Championship eight times between 2013 and 2021, and the Espirito Santo Trophy twice.

She won the Icelandic Junior Stroke Play Championship and the Icelandic Junior Tour Order of Merit multiple times. She was runner-up in the Icelandic Match Play Championship in 2016, and won in 2018. She won the 2016 Icelandic Tour Order of Merit.

Kristinsdóttir was the stroke play medalist at the 2021 Women's Amateur Championship at Kilmarnock (Barassie) Golf Club after a final round of seven-under-par 66.

Kristinsdóttir attended Eastern Kentucky University between 2017 and 2022 and played with the Eastern Kentucky Colonels women's golf team. She set several scoring records and recorded 6 wins, earned all-conference honors four times, and was named conference Freshman of the Year and its Golfer of the Year her final season.

== Professional career ==
Kristinsdóttir turned professional in 2023 and joined the LET Access Series. In 2025, she was runner-up at the Swedish Strokeplay Championship, a stroke behind Andrea Lignell, before securing her maiden professional title at the Västerås Ladies Open a week later.

== Amateur wins ==
- 2012 Icelandic Junior 15-16, Eimskip Tournament #6
- 2015 Eimskip Tournament #1, Islandsbanka Tournament #4 – Icelandic Junior Stroke Play
- 2017 Eimskip Tournament #4
- 2018 Pinehurst Intercollegiate, Eimskip Tournament #4, Eimskip Tournament #5 – Icelandic Match Play
- 2019 Stiga Tournament #3, Stiga Tournament #5
- 2021 Bobby Nichols Intercollegiate, Colonel Classic, Hvaleyrar Cup, Johnie Imes Invitational, French Broad Collegiate Invitational
- 2022 Colonel Classic, Hvaleyrar Cup

== Professional wins (1) ==
=== LET Access Series wins (1) ===
| No. | Date | Tournament | Winning score | To par | Margin of victory | Runner-up |
|---|---|---|---|---|---|---|
| 1 | 11 Jul 2025 | Västerås Ladies Open | 65-70-73=208 | −8 | 1 stroke | (Denmark) Amalie Leth-Nissen |

== Team appearances ==
Amateur

- European Young Masters (representing Iceland): 2013
- Duke of York Young Champions Trophy (representing Iceland): 2014, 2015
- European Ladies' Team Championship (representing Iceland): 2013, 2014, 2015, 2016, 2017, 2018, 2019, 2021
- Espirito Santo Trophy (representing Iceland): 2018, 2022
- Spirit International Amateur (representing Iceland): 2021
