= Ahlsell Trophy =

Golf tournament held in Sweden

Coordinates: 57.989°N 14.423°E

Tournament information
- Location: Jönköping, Sweden
- Established: 2011
- Course: Gränna Golf Club
- Par: 72
- Tours: Swedish Golf Tour; LET Access Series
- Format: 54-hole stroke play
- Prize fund: €45,000

Tournament record score
- Aggregate: 198 Sára Kousková
- To par: −12 as above

Current champion
- (Spain) Amaia Latorre

The Ahlsell Trophy is a women's professional golf tournament on the Swedish Golf Tour, first played in 2011. It is held near Jönköping, Sweden.

== History ==
The tournament was introduced in 2011, in the second season of the Nordea Tour era, and held at A6 Golf Club, named after the Jönköping Garrison of the Småland Artillery Regiment. Danish amateur Nanna Koerstz Madsen won the final installment at A6 Golf Club in 2013.

Jönköping returned to the schedule with the Elite Hotels Open in 2022, now also as a LET Access Series event attracting a European field, with Czech Sára Kousková as champion. After a one-year hiatus, Destination Jönköping sponsored the Ahlsell Trophy in nearby Gränna from 2024.

== Winners ==
Year	Tour(s)	Winner	Score	Margin of victory	Runner(s)-up	Prize fund (SEK)	Venue	Ref
Ahlsell Trophy by Destination Jönköping
2025	SGT · LETAS	(Spain) Amaia Latorre	−8 (72-70-66=208)	Playoff	(Sweden) Isabell Ekström	€45,000	Gränna Golf Club	
2024	SGT · LETAS	(Germany) Patricia Isabel Schmidt	−10 (69-67-70=206)	2 strokes	(Italy) Alessia Nobilio (a)	€40,000	Gränna Golf Club	
2023: No tournament
Elite Hotels Open
2022	SGT · LETAS	(Czech Republic) Sára Kousková	−12 (65-67-66=198)	3 strokes	(Switzerland) Vanessa Knecht (a)	€40,000	Jönköping Golf Club	
2014–2021: No tournament
A6 Ladies Open
2013	SGT	(Denmark) Nanna Koerstz Madsen (a)	−6 (73-71-66=210)	3 strokes	(Sweden) Eva Bjärvall (Sweden) Josephine Janson	200,000	A6 Golf Club	
2012	SGT	(Sweden) Anna Dahlberg Söderström	−5 (73-69-69=211)	1 stroke	(Norway) Cecilie Lundgreen	200,000	A6 Golf Club	
2011	SGT	(Sweden) Julia Davidsson	−3 (67-71-75=213)	2 strokes	(Sweden) Anna Dahlberg Söderström	200,000	A6 Golf Club	
