= Justice Bosio =

Australian professional golfer (born 2004)

Personal information
- Nationality: Australia
- Born: 2004 (age 21–22) Alice Springs, Northern Territory, Australia

Career
- Sport: Golf
- Turned professional: 2024
- Current tours: Ladies European Tour (joined 2026); WPGA Tour of Australasia
- Former tour: LET Access Series (joined 2025)

Best results in LPGA major championships
- Chevron Championship: DNP
- Women's PGA C'ship: DNP
- U.S. Women's Open: DNP
- Women's British Open: CUT: 2026
- Evian Championship: DNP

Achievements and awards
- Karrie Webb Award: 2023

Justice Bosio (born 2004) is an Australian professional golfer who plays on the WPGA Tour of Australasia and the Ladies European Tour.

== Early life and amateur career ==
Bosio was born in Alice Springs, and was introduced to golf by her father after the family moved to Darwin when she was three. Her father Luke, a tennis coach, has Italian and Egyptian heritage through his parents. A stellar amateur, she finished 3rd at the 2021 Australian Master of the Amateurs, and was runner-up at the Australian Women's Amateur in 2022 and 2023.

She had some success in the U.S. and won the 2024 Pacific Northwest Women's Amateur Championship after reaching the quarterfinals at the 2022 U.S. Girls' Junior, and a 5th place at the North and South Women's Amateur Golf Championship in 2022 and 2023.

Bosio also performed well in a number of professional events as a teenager, and finished 11th at the 2022 Women's Australian Open, 6th at the 2022 Australian Women's Classic, and 6th at the 2024 NSW Women's Open. She was the leading woman at the 2024 Webex Players Series Hunter Valley, and runner-up woman at the 2023 Webex Players Series Victoria and 2024 Webex Players Series Sydney.

Bosio represented Australia at the 2023 Espirito Santo Trophy, where her team finished tied 6th alongside the United States. She became the number one ranked Australian amateur and received the Karrie Webb Award.

== Professional career ==
Bosio turned professional in October 2024 and joined the WPGA Tour of Australasia, where she was runner-up as leading woman at the 2025 Webex Players Series Sydney behind Cassie Porter.

She also joined the 2025 LET Access Series after winning her LET Q-School pre-qualifyer, and was runner-up at the Santander Golf Tour Ávila behind Alejandra Llaneza, and lost a playoff at the Amundi Czech Ladies Challenge.

== Amateur wins ==
- 2020 South Australia Junior Amateur Championship, South Australian Junior Masters, The Invincibles IGA Sunshine Junior Masters Championship, Keperra Bowl, Adidas Golf Junior 6s Invitational National Final
- 2022 Keperra Bowl
- 2023 South Australia Women's Amateur Championship, Keperra Bowl
- 2024 Pacific Northwest Women's Amateur Championship

== Playoff record ==
Ladies European Tour playoff record (0–1)

No.	Year	Tournament	Opponents	Result
1	2026	Tipsport Czech Ladies Open	(Finland) Noora Komulainen (Sweden) Lisa Pettersson	Komulainen won with birdie on first extra hole

LET Access Series playoff record (0–1)

No.	Year	Tournament	Opponents	Result
1	2025	Amundi Czech Ladies Challenge	(England) Gemma Clews (France) Alice Kong (a) (Austria) Katharina Muehlbauer	Kong won with birdie on first extra hole

== Results in LPGA majors ==
Tournament	2026
Chevron Championship	
U.S. Women's Open	
Women's PGA Championship	
The Evian Championship	
Women's British Open	CUT

Did not play

CUT = missed the half-way cut

== Team appearances ==
Amateur

- Australian Girl's Interstate Teams Matches (representing Queensland): 2019
- Australian Interstate Teams Matches (representing Queensland): 2022, 2023, 2024
- Espirito Santo Trophy (representing Australia): 2023
- Queen Sirikit Cup (representing Australia): 2024
