= Klára Spilková =

Czech professional golfer

Klára Davidson Spilková
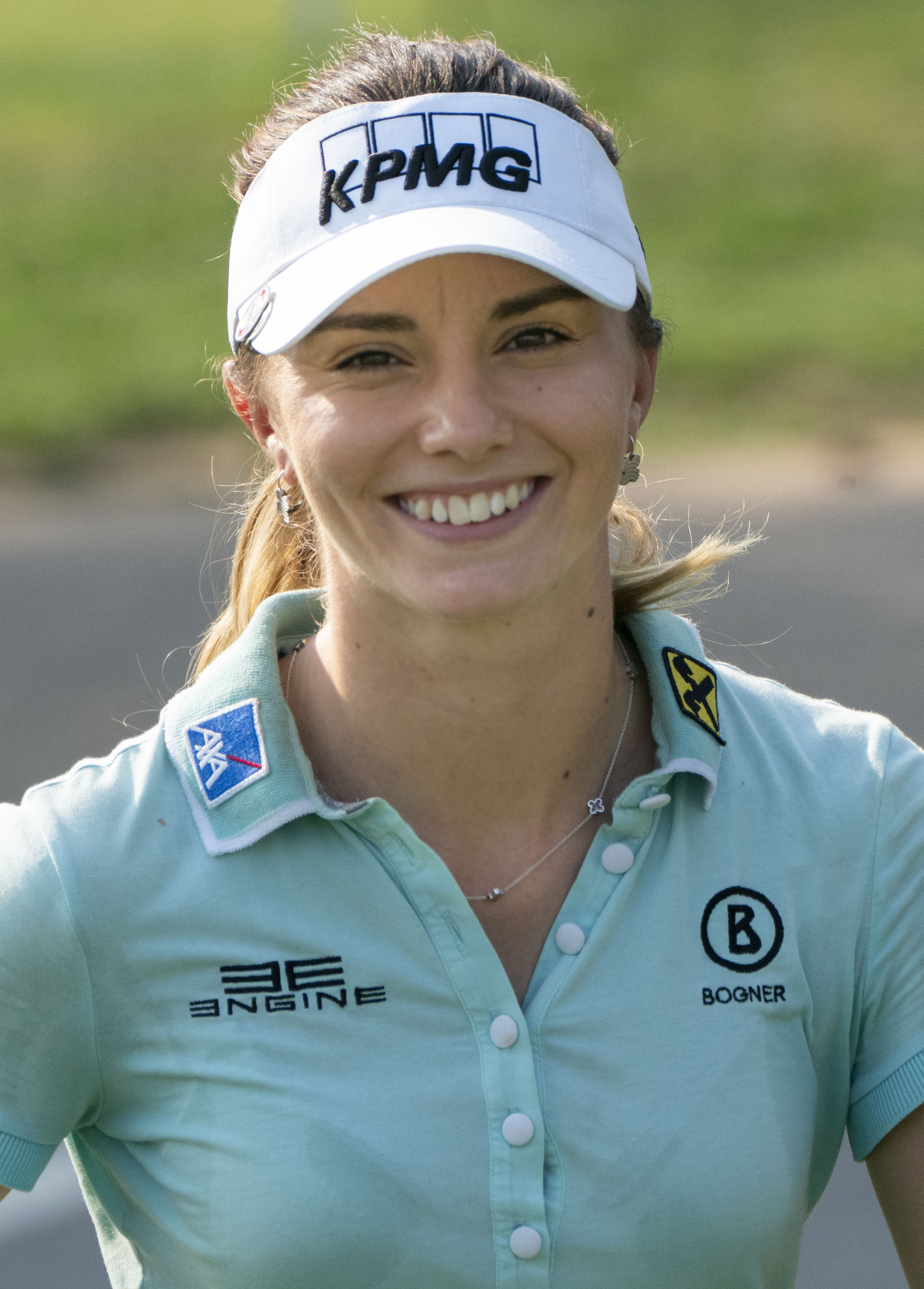
- Spilková in 2018

Personal information
- Nationality: Czech Republic
- Born: 15 December 1994 (age 31) Prague, Czech Republic
- Height: 168 cm (5 ft 6 in)
- Spouse: Sean Davidson (m. 2022)

Career
- Sport: Golf
- Turned professional: 2011
- Current tours: Ladies European Tour (joined 2011); LPGA Tour (joined 2019)
- Professional wins: 2

Number of wins by tour
- Ladies European Tour: 2

Best results in LPGA major championships
- Chevron Championship: WD: 2020
- Women's PGA C'ship: T70: 2017
- U.S. Women's Open: 59th: 2025
- Women's British Open: T50: 2018
- Evian Championship: T55: 2015

Klára Davidson Spilková (born 15 December 1994) is a Czech professional golfer who plays on the Ladies European Tour (LET). She won the 2017 Lalla Meryem Cup and the 2022 Women's Irish Open.

== Early life and amateur career ==
Spilková had a successful amateur career after she was introduced to golf by her older brother Lukas at the age of four. She won the European Young Masters in 2009, and won both the Czech Women's Amateur and the German Girls Open back to back in 2009 and 2010. In 2010 she won the Austrian Women's Amateur.

She lost the final of the 2009 French International Lady Juniors Amateur Championship (Trophée Esmond) 1 up to Leona Maguire. Her performance helped her qualify for the continental team, and she represented Europe at the 2009 Junior Solheim Cup and the 2010 Junior Ryder Cup.

In 2010, at only fifteen, she made her first LET start at the Allianz Ladies Slovak Open, but missed the cut by two strokes.

== Professional career ==
Spilková turned professional in 2011 at age 16 and joined the Ladies European Tour. She was 7th in the Rolex Rookie of the Year standings, behind winner Caroline Hedwall. She finished tied sixth in the 2013 ISPS Handa Ladies European Masters and at the 2014 Turkish Ladies Open. In 2015, she tied for 4th at the Ladies Scottish Open.

In 2017, Spilková became the first Czech winner on the LET with her victory at the Lalla Meryem Cup.

Spilková finished fourth at the inaugural LPGA Tour Q-Series to earn a card for 2019. Over the next three seasons she finished 140, 100 and 127th in the rankings, with a best finish of tied 8th at the 2020 Gainbridge LPGA at Boca Rio.

As the highest ranked Czech golfer, she represented her country at the 2016 Summer Olympics in Rio de Janeiro and the 2020 Summer Olympics in Tokyo, and finished tied 48th and 23rd.

In 2022, Spilková rejoined the LET. She was runner-up at the Tipsport Czech Ladies Open, a stroke behind compatritot Jana Melichová. She then secured her second LET victory with a birdie at the first playoff hole at the KPMG Women's Irish Open, seeing off Finland's Ursula Wikström and Denmark's Nicole Broch Estrup.

== Personal life ==
Spilková married Sean Davidson in 2022. He is an Italian American teacher at the Faculty of Law of Charles University in Prague. He was a college golfer at Davidson College. They met on the golf course. Davidson has been a caddie for Klara occasionally, including at the Olympics in Tokyo. He also has been a caddie for his brother Matt, who is a former PGA Tour player.

== Amateur wins ==
- 2009 German Girls Open, Czech Women's Amateur, European Young Masters
- 2010 German Girls Open, Czech Women's Amateur, Austrian Women's Amateur

== Professional wins (2) ==
=== Ladies European Tour wins (2) ===
No.	Date	Tournament	Winning score	To par	Margin of victory	Runner-up	Winner's share (€)
1	16 Apr 2017	Lalla Meryem Cup	69-74-71-66=280	−8	1 stroke	(Norway) Suzann Pettersen	67,500
2	25 Sep 2022	KPMG Women's Irish Open	66-68-73-67=274	−14	Playoff	(Finland) Ursula Wikström (Denmark) Nicole Broch Estrup	60,000

== Results in LPGA majors ==
Results not in chronological order.

Tournament	2013	2014	2015	2016	2017	2018	2019
Chevron Championship							
Women's PGA Championship				CUT	T70	CUT	WD
U.S. Women's Open						CUT	
The Evian Championship			T55		CUT	CUT	
Women's British Open	CUT	CUT	CUT		T69	T50	

Tournament	2020	2021	2022	2023	2024	2025
Chevron Championship						
U.S. Women's Open						59
Women's PGA Championship	CUT	CUT				
The Evian Championship	NT			CUT		
Women's British Open	CUT			T56	CUT	

Did not play

CUT = missed the half-way cut
WD = withdrew
NT = no tournament
"T" = tied

=== Summary ===
Tournament	Wins	2nd	3rd	Top-5	Top-10	Top-25	Events	Cuts made
Chevron Championship	0	0	0	0	0	0	0	0
U.S. Women's Open	0	0	0	0	0	0	2	1
Women's PGA Championship	0	0	0	0	0	0	6	1
Women's British Open	0	0	0	0	0	0	8	3
The Evian Championship	0	0	0	0	0	0	4	1
Totals	0	0	0	0	0	0	20	6

== Team appearances ==
Amateur

- Espirito Santo Trophy (representing Czech Republic): 2008, 2010
- Junior Solheim Cup (representing Europe): 2009
- Junior Ryder Cup (representing Europe): 2010
