= Isabell Ekström =

Swedish professional golfer (born 1998)

Personal information
- Full name: Isabell Charlotte Ekström
- Nationality: Sweden
- Born: 13 April 1998 (age 28) Uppsala, Sweden
- Height: 5 ft 7 in (170 cm)

Career
- Sport: Golf
- College: Campbell University
- Turned professional: 2021
- Current tours: LET Access Series (joined 2022); Swedish Golf Tour (joined 2021)
- Professional wins: 2

Achievements and awards
- Big South Freshman of the Year: 2018

Isabell Ekström (born 13 April 1998) is a Swedish professional golfer. She was runner-up at the 2023 Ahlsell Final and the 2025 Ahlsell Trophy on the LET Access Series.

== Early life and amateur career ==
Ekström was born in Uppsala in 1998. Her parents established the GolfUppsala golf course on their farm Söderby Gård in 1995, and she was raised on the course. The property hosted the Söderby Masters on the men's Swedish Golf Tour between 2008 and 2017, exposing her to tournament golf with winners such as Pehr Magnebrant, Joakim Rask and Lucas Bjerregaard.

Ekström won eight tournaments in the Junior Masters Invitational series between 2014 and 2018, and was runner-up in a further four. She reached the semi-finals of the 2017 Swedish Junior Matchplay Championship, won by Sara Kjellker. Ekström won the 2018 GolfUppsala Junior Open, played at her home course at Söderby, by 15 strokes ahead of Natacha Host Husted from Denmark in second.

Internationally, Ekström was runner-up in the 2016 Norwegian Junior Trophy, finished 3rd in the 2016 Greg Norman Academy Junior Invitational at Myrtle Beach, and 3rd in the 2017 Colombian Junior International.

After graduating from the RIG Golf-program at Celsiusskolan in Uppsala, Ekström attended Campbell University from 2017 to 2021 and played golf with the Campbell Fighting Camels women's golf team. In 2018 she won the Big South Championship and was named Big South Freshman of the Year, before sitting out her junior year due to a neck injury. She recorded the second-lowest women's career stroke average (73.55) in school history.

== Professional career ==
Ekström turned professional after she graduated in 2021 and joined the Swedish Golf Tour. She won her first professional tournament in September at the Skytteholm Open.

In 2022, she joined the LET Access Series, where her best finish was a tie for 5th at the Smørum Ladies Open in Denmark. In 2023, she reached the quarterfinals of the Swedish Matchplay Championship, and was runner-up at the Ahlsell Final, a stroke behind Avani Prashanth of India. In 2024 she finished top-10 in her first four LETAS starts, including a tie for 3rd at the Rose Ladies Open in England, but missed half the season due to an appendectomy.

In 2025, she tied for 3rd at the Västerås Ladies Open, before losing a playoff to Amaia Latorre of Spain at the Ahlsell Trophy.

== Amateur wins ==
- 2014 McDonald's Junior Cup
- 2015 Vreta Ping Junior Open, GolfUppsala Junior Open, Richard S. Johnson Junior Open
- 2016 Magnus Jakobsson's Memorial, GolfUppsala Junior Open
- 2017 Galvin Green Junior Open
- 2018 Big South Championship, Uppland District Championship, GolfUppsala Junior Open, Golfweek Program Challenge

== Professional wins (2) ==
=== Other wins (2) ===
- 2021 Skytteholm Open (Swedish Future Series)
- 2022 Hjo S Open (Swedish Future Series)

== Playoff record ==
LET Access Series playoff record (0–1)

No.	Year	Tournament	Opponent	Result
1	2025	Ahlsell Trophy	(Spain) Amaia Latorre	Lost on first extra hole
