= Céline Herbin =

French professional golfer

Personal information
- Full name: Céline Herbin-Marshall
- Nationality: France
- Born: 30 October 1982 (age 44) Avranches, France
- Height: 178 cm (5 ft 10 in)
- Spouse: Gary Marshall

Career
- Sport: Golf
- College: Bucknell University; INSA Toulouse; HEC Paris
- Turned professional: 2009
- Current tours: LPGA Tour; Ladies European Tour
- Former tour: Symetra Tour
- Professional wins: 2

Number of wins by tour
- Ladies European Tour: 2

Best results in LPGA major championships
- Chevron Championship: DNP
- Women's PGA C'ship: T46: 2016
- U.S. Women's Open: T14: 2021
- Women's British Open: T51: 2020
- Evian Championship: T62: 2019

Céline Herbin-Marshall (born 30 October 1982) is a French professional golfer. She has won twice on the Ladies European Tour.

== Early life and education ==
Herbin started playing golf in 1997, at the age of 15, after she relocated to Mignaloux-Beauvoir with her family. She competed internationally while pursuing a degree in Biochemical Engineering at Institut national des sciences appliquées de Toulouse. During her junior year, she was an exchange student at Bucknell University in Lewisburg, Pennsylvania. A star performer on the Bucknell Bison women's golf team, she set several school records and won the 2004 Georgetown Invitational. She returned to France to pursue a master's degree in marketing at HEC Paris.

== Professional career ==
After graduation, Herbin turned professional in 2009 and relocated to Pedreña in Cantabria, Spain. Struggling to join the LET, she played on the local Barnesto Tour in 2009 and 2010, and in the LET Access Series in 2011, where she finished fourth at the Azores Ladies Open. In July 2011 Seve Ballesteros' brother Vicente became her coach at Real Golf de Pedrena, and she secured a full card for the 2012 Ladies European Tour by finishing tied 7th at Q-School that fall.

Herbin competed on the LET full time 2012–2014. She finished fourth at the Open de España Femenino in 2013 and fifth in 2014, before winning her first title, the 2015 Open de France Dames in a playoff with Emily Kristine Pedersen. After the win she rose to a career high of 165th in the Women's World Golf Rankings.

In 2015, she also joined the Symetra Tour, where her best finish was a tie for 4th at the Island Resort Championship. In 2016, she joined the LPGA Tour, while continuing to play in selected LET events.

She lost a playoff at the 2017 Omega Dubai Ladies Masters. In 2019, she secured her second LET title at La Reserva de Sotogrande Invitational, and in 2020 she was runner-up at the Lacoste Ladies Open de France, a stroke behind Julia Engström. She finished tied 14th at the 2021 U.S. Women's Open and shortly afterwards finished 8th at the Volunteers of America Classic, her career best LPGA Tour finish.

Herbin played on the runner-up team at the 2022 Aramco Team Series – New York, and she was runner-up at the 2023 Jabra Ladies Open at Evian Resort Golf Club behind Linn Grant. A few weeks later she finished 3rd in the Tipsport Czech Ladies Open. She lives and trains at La Sella Golf, host to the La Sella Open, in Alicante, Spain.

== Personal life ==
Herbin is married to caddie Gary Marshall from Edinburgh, Scotland. The pair got engaged in March 2024.

== Amateur wins ==
- 2004 Georgetown Invitational

== Professional wins ==
=== Ladies European Tour wins (2) ===
No.	Date	Tournament	Winning score	To par	Margin of victory	Runner-up
1	27 Sep 2015	Open de France Dames	66-68-65-70=269	−11	Playoff	(Denmark) Emily Kristine Pedersen (a)
2	19 May 2019	La Reserva de Sotogrande Invitational	70-70-73-69=282	−6	1 stroke	(Germany) Esther Henseleit

Ladies European Tour playoff record (1–1)

No.	Year	Tournament	Opponent(s)	Result
1	2015	Open de France Dames	(Denmark) Emily Kristine Pedersen	Won with a par on the third extra hole
2	2017	Omega Dubai Ladies Masters	(South Korea) In-Kyung Kim, (United States) Angel Yin	Yin won with birdie on second extra hole

== Results in LPGA majors ==
Results not in chronological order before 2022.

Tournament	2016	2017	2018	2019	2020	2021	2022	2023
Chevron Championship								
U.S. Women's Open			CUT			T14		
Women's PGA Championship	T46	CUT	CUT			CUT		
The Evian Championship	T69			T62	NT	T68		CUT
Women's British Open			T61	CUT	T51	CUT	CUT	CUT

Did not play

CUT = missed the half-way cut
NT = no tournament
"T" = tied

== Team appearances ==
Professional

- European Championships (representing France): 2018
