= Australian Interstate Teams Matches =

Amateur team golf tournament

Tournament information
- Established: 2020
- Course: Glenelg Golf Club (2026)
- Format: Team match play

Current champion
- Victoria

The Australian Interstate Teams Matches is a mixed gender amateur team golf competition between the states of Australia. Planned in 2020, it was not held until 2022 because of the COVID-19 pandemic. It replaced the earlier separate men's and women's events which were last held in 2019.

== Format ==
The event is contested by the six states of Australia. The format is a round-robin tournament, each team playing the other five teams, after which the top two teams play a final.

From 2023 each team consists of up to 10 players, five men and five women, although only four men and four women play in each match. In 2022 there were just four men and four women in each team. There are eight singles in each match, men playing men and women playing women, all contests being over 18 holes. Extra holes are not played. Final positions after the round-robin are decided firstly by the number of team points. Each team get half a point in a tied team match. Where teams are level on team points, the order is decided on individual matches won. The leading two teams after the round-robin contest a final, to determine the winner of the event.

== Results ==
Year	Winners	Final	RR	Runners-up	RR	Venue	Ref.
2026	Victoria	6–2	5–29.5	New South Wales	3.5–22	Glenelg	
2025	New South Wales	6.5–1.5	4–28	Queensland	4.5–27.5	Melville Glades	
2024	Victoria	6–2	4–26.5	Queensland	4.5–25	Southport	
2023	New South Wales	6–2	4–27.5	South Australia	4–24.5	St Michaels	
2022	Victoria	5.5–2.5	4–24.5	South Australia	3.5–24	Sorrento	
2021	No tournament due to COVID-19 pandemic					Bonnie Doon	
2020	No tournament due to COVID-19 pandemic					Bonnie Doon	

RR– Team's score in the round-robin stage. Positions were determined by the number of team points and where that is equal by the number of individual match points.

== Appearances ==
The following players competed in 2022

- New South Wales: Harry Bolton, Harrison Crowe, Chris Fan, Jye Pickin, Kelsey Bennett, Belinda Ji, Brielle Mapanao, Hayley McNeill
- Queensland: Quinnton Croker, Tyler Duncan, Blaike Perkins, Sam Slater, Justice Bosio, Rhianna Lewis, Hannah Reeves, Sarah Wilson
- South Australia: Jack Buchanan, Billy Cawthorne, Kyle Hayter, Charlie Nobbs, Raegan Denton, Matilda Miels, Caitlin Peirce, Amelia Whinney
- Tasmania: Joey Bower, Ronan Filgate, Hunter Gillard, Mark Schulze, Jorjah Bailey, Sarah Johnstone, Hallie Meaburn, Mackenzie Wilson
- Victoria: Phoenix Campbell, Andre Lautee, Jasper Stubbs, Toby Walker, Amelia Harris, Keeley Marx, Kono Matsumoto, Molly McLean
- Western Australia: Connor Fewkes, Joshua Greer, Hayden Hopewell, Connor McKinney, Celine Chen, Sheridan Clancy, Amie Phobubpa, Kirsten Rudgeley

The following players competed in 2023

- New South Wales: Harrison Crowe, Jeffrey Guan, Daley Loumanis, Declan O'Donovan, Jye Pickin, Belinda Ji, Rachel Lee, Charlotte Perkins, Annika Rathbone, June Song
- Queensland: Quinnton Croker, Tyler Duncan, Lincoln Morgan, Blaike Perkins, Samuel Slater, Justice Bosio, Sarah Hammett, Kate McFarlane, Hannah Reeves, Shyla Singh
- South Australia: Kade Bryant, Jack Buchanan, Harry Coote, Sam Earl, Kyle Hayter, Raegan Denton, Imogen Jessen, Matilda Miels, Caitlin Peirce, Amelia Whinney
- Tasmania: Joey Bower, Ronan Filgate, Greg Longmore, Ryan Thomas, Jack Tregaskisjago, Jorjah Bailey, Zahara Lemon, Hallie Meaburn, Mackenzie Thomas, Mackenzie Wilson
- Victoria: Phoenix Campbell, Connor Mcdade, Nathan Page, Jasper Stubbs, Toby Walker, Jesika Clark, Amelia Harris, Keeley Marx, Molly Mclean, Jazy Roberts
- Western Australia: Tom Addy, Joseph Buttress, Jordan Doull, Connor Fewkes, Joshua Greer, Celine Chen, Amanda Gan, Pantita Phobubpa, Erina Tan, Abbie Teasdale

The following players competed in 2024

- New South Wales: Coby Carruthers, Jye Halls, Declan O'Donovan, Jye Pickin, Jeffrey Pullen, Sophie Eppelstun, Rachel Lee, Annika Rathbone, Ella Scaysbrook, Amy Squires
- Queensland: William Bowen, Quinnton Croker, Kai Komulainen, Lincoln Morgan, Harry Takis, Justice Bosio, Sarah Hammett, Ionna Muir, Hannah Reeves, Shyla Singh
- South Australia: Kade Bryant, Sam Earl, Joshua Grundel, Kyle Hayter, Jack Tanner, Raegan Denton, Imogen Jessen, Matilda Miels, Caitlin Peirce, Amelia Whinney
- Tasmania: Joseph Bower, Ronan Filgate, Jonty Lunson, Elijah Monaghan, Mitch van Noord, Jorjah Bailey, Tailah Mowat, Mackenzie Thomas, Mackenzie Wilson
- Victoria: Phoenix Campbell, Abel Eduard, Connor McDade, Siddharth Nadimpalli, Jasper Stubbs, Shanaiah Fernando, Amelia Harris, Seabil Leong, Molly Mclean, Jazy Roberts
- Western Australia: Joseph Buttress, Jordan Doull, Josiah Edwards, Connor Fewkes, Michael Hanrahan Smith, Ruby Cotton, Amanda Gan, Isabella Leniartek, Erina Tan, Abbie Teasdale
