= Tomáš Kazár =

Czech footballer

Personal information
- Full name: Tomáš Kazár
- Date of birth: 10 August 1984 (age 42)
- Place of birth: Czech Republic
- Height: 1.77 m (5 ft 9 1/2 in)
- Position: Midfielder

Senior career*
Years	Team	Apps	(Gls)
2007–2011	Sigma Olomouc	31	(4)
- * Club domestic league appearances and goals as of 2 August 2011

Tomáš Kazár (born 8 October 1984) is a Czech footballer who plays as a midfielder. He previously played for Sigma Olomouc. He wears the number 9 shirt. He made his debut for Sigma Olomouc on 5 August 2007 in a 2–0 defeat to SK Ceske Budejovice.
