= Amaia Latorre =

Spanish professional golfer (born 1998)

Personal information
- Full name: Amaia Latorre Santamaría
- Nationality: Spain
- Born: 4 June 1998 (age 28) Vitoria-Gasteiz, Álava, Spain
- Height: 167 cm (5 ft 6 in)

Career
- Sport: Golf
- College: University of Deusto
- Turned professional: 2022
- Current tours: Ladies European Tour (joined 2025); LET Access Series (joined 2024); Santander Golf Tour (joined 2022)
- Professional wins: 4

Achievements and awards
- Santander Golf Tour Player of the Year: 2022

Amaia Latorre (born 4 June 1998) is a Spanish professional golfer and Ladies European Tour player.

== Early life and amateur career ==
Latorre was born in 1998 in Vitoria-Gasteiz, the capital city of the province of Álava in Basque Country. For years she combined golf and football, where she wore number eleven and liked playing as a defensive midfielder.

Latorre was educated at the University of Deusto, and was runner-up at the 2019 Campeonato de España Universitario.

== Professional career ==
Latorre turned professional early 2022 and joined the Santander Golf Tour, the main women's tour in Spain, where she was voted Player of the Year by her peers at the end of the season.

In 2023 she won twice, the doubles tournament at Sherry Golf Jerez alongside Nuria Iturrioz, and the tournament at La Coruña where she finished four strokes ahead of Maho Hayakawa of Japan. She ended the season second in the Order of Merit, behind only Mireia Prat. She later won the 2025 Santander Golf Tour Valencia to bring her titles on the tour to three.

In 2024, Latorre joined the LET Access Series, where her best finish was a tie for 3rd at the Calatayud Ladies Open. She finished top-50 at Q-School to earn partial status for the 2025 Ladies European Tour, where her best finish in eleven starts was a tie for 17th at the Jabra Ladies Open in France. She won the Ahlsell Trophy in Sweden, beating home player Isabell Ekström on the first hole of a playoff. She tied for 30th at Q-School to secure LET status for 2026.

== Amateur wins ==
- 2018 Grand Prix de la Nivelle
- 2019 Campeonato Absoluto del Pais Vasco
- 2021 Campeonato Absoluto del Pais Vasco

== Professional wins (4) ==
=== LET Access Series wins (1) ===
No.	Date	Tournament	Winning score	To par	Margin of victory	Runner-up
1	8 Aug 2025	Ahlsell Trophy	72-70-66=208	−8	Playoff	(Sweden) Isabell Ekström

=== Santander Golf Tour wins (3) ===
No.	Date	Tournament	Winning score	To par	Margin of victory	Runner-up	Ref
1	5 May 2023	Santander Golf Tour Cádiz (with Nuria Iturrioz)	62-66=128	−6	3 strokes	(Spain) Carmen Alonso & (Spain) Marta Martín	
2	25 May 2023	Santander Golf Tour La Coruña	70-72=142	Par	4 strokes	(Japan) Maho Hayakawa	
3	10 Apr 2025	Santander Golf Tour Valencia	70-71=141	–3	8 strokes	(Spain) Marina Escobar	
