= 2022 LET Access Series =

Professional women's golf tour

2022 LET Access Series season
- Duration: April 2022 – October 2022
- Number of official events: 19 (1 cancelled)
- Most wins: (Czech Republic) Sára Kousková (3)
- Order of Merit winner: (Czech Republic) Sára Kousková
- Rookie of the Year: (Czech Republic) Sára Kousková

The 2022 LET Access Series was a series of professional women's golf tournaments held from March through October 2022 across Europe. The LET Access Series is the second-tier women's professional golf tour in Europe and is the official developmental tour of the Ladies European Tour.

== Changes for 2022 ==
The schedule returned to pre-pandemic size after two seasons of reduced schedule. The Calatayud Ladies Open and Smørum Ladies Open were added, as were the Rose Ladies Open and the Trust Golf Links Series in the UK, while the mixed event with the Alps Tour returned from Rome to France. The season saw the introduction of the LETAS Grand Final, a season finale featuring the top 50 players in the Order of Merit, boasting the biggest prize fund in LETAS history with €80,000, which ultimately was cancelled.

== Tournament results ==
The table below shows the 2022 schedule. The numbers in brackets after the winners' names show the number of career wins they had on the LET Access Series up to and including that event.

Dates	Tournament	Location	Prize fund (€)	Winner	WWGR points	Notes
2 Apr	Terre Blanche Ladies Open	France	40,000	(Italy) Lucrezia Colombotto Rosso (1)	2	
14 May	Flumserberg Ladies Open	Switzerland	45,000	(Netherlands) Lauren Holmey (a,1)	2	
21 May	PGA Championship Trelleborg	Sweden	50,000	(Sweden) Meja Örtengren (a,1)	2	
5 Jun	Amundi Czech Ladies Challenge	Czech Republic	37,500	(Germany) Chiara Noja (1)	2	
12 Jun	Montauban Ladies Open	France	42,500	(New Zealand) Momoka Kobori (1)	2	
17 Jun	Smørum Ladies Open	Denmark	50,000	(Denmark) Cecilie Leth-Nissen (a,1)	2	
25 Jun	Golf Vlaanderen LETAS Trophy	Belgium	40,000	(Australia) Kristalle Blum (1)	2	
2 Jul	Hauts de France - Pas de Calais Golf Open	France	40,000	(New Zealand) Momoka Kobori (2)	2	Mixed event with the Alps Tour
8 Jul	Trust Golf Links Series - Ramside Hall	England	40,000	(Thailand) Chanettee Wannasaen (1)	2	
16 Jul	Trust Golf Links Series - Musselburgh	Scotland	40,000	(Thailand) Arpichaya Yubol (1)	2	
23 Jul	Santander Golf Tour Málaga	Spain	40,000	(Czech Republic) Sára Kousková (2)	2	
5 Aug	Västerås Ladies Open	Sweden	40,000	(Sweden) Sara Ericsson (a,1)	3	
12 Aug	Big Green Egg Swedish Matchplay Championship	Sweden	40,000	(Germany) Patricia Isabel Schmidt (1)	2	Match play event
26 Aug	Göteborg Ladies Open	Sweden	40,000	(France) Nastasia Nadaud (a,1)	3	
2 Sep	Elite Hotels Open	Sweden	40,000	(Czech Republic) Sára Kousková (3)	3	
16 Sep	ASGI Lavaux Ladies Open	Switzerland	40,000	(Czech Republic) Sára Kousková (4)	3	
25 Sep	Rose Ladies Open	England	65,000	(Sweden) My Leander (1)	4	
8 Oct	Santander Golf Tour Burgos	Spain	40,000	(Germany) Verena Gimmy (1)	3	
14 Oct	Calatayud Ladies Open	Spain	40,000	(England) Amy Taylor (1)	3	
~~23 Oct~~	LETAS Grand Finale	France	80,000	Cancelled	–	Flagship event

== Order of Merit rankings ==
The top 6 players on the LETAS Order of Merit earned membership of the Ladies European Tour for the 2023 season. Players finishing in positions 7–21 got to skip the first stage of the qualifying event and automatically progress to the final stage of the Lalla Aicha Tour School.

Rank	Player	Country	Events	Points	Status earned
1	Sára Kousková	Czech Republic	10	2,592	Promoted to Ladies European Tour
2	Chiara Noja	Germany	13	2,218	Promoted to Ladies European Tour
3	Momoka Kobori	New Zealand	12	2,048	Promoted to Ladies European Tour
4	Patricia Isabel Schmidt	Germany	19	1,968	Promoted to Ladies European Tour
5	Lauren Holmey	Netherlands	14	1,620	Promoted to Ladies European Tour
6	Anna Magnusson	Sweden	17	1,425	Promoted to Ladies European Tour
7	Amy Taylor	England	12	1,415	Qualified for Ladies European Tour (Top 50 in Q School)
8	Kristalle Blum	Australia	16	1,224	
9	Gemma Clews	England	17	1,208	
10	Noemí Jiménez	Spain	14	1,125	

== See also ==
- 2022 Ladies European Tour
- 2022 in golf
