= Cecilie Leth-Nissen =

Danish professional golfer (born 2003)

Personal information
- Nationality: Denmark
- Born: 2003 (age 22–23) Copenhagen, Denmark
- Height: 174 cm (5 ft 9 in)

Career
- Sport: Golf
- College: Oklahoma State University
- Turned professional: 2024
- Current tour: LET Access Series (joined 2023)
- Professional wins: 1

Achievements and awards
- Danish Golfer of the Year (Den Gyldne Golfbold): 2019

Cecilie Leth-Nissen (born 2003) is a Danish professional golfer and LET Access Series player. She won the 2022 Smørum Ladies Open as an amateur.

== Early life and family ==
Leth-Nissen was born in 2003 and grew up in Herlev, a suburb of Copenhagen. She was introduced to golf at the age of nine.

She has three sisters, Sofie, Marie and the one-year younger Amalie, who is also a professional golfer and plays on the Ladies European Tour.

== Amateur career ==
Leth-Nissen had a successful amateur career and won both the Danish National Girls Championship and Danish International Ladies Amateur Championship. In 2023, she won the European Ladies' Club Trophy, a European Golf Association event.

Leth-Nissen joined the National Team when she was 13 years old. Representing Denmark, she won the 2019 European Girls' Team Championship and lead her team to a third-place finish in the 2022 European Ladies' Team Championship, both alongside her sister Amalie. The 2019 team received Den Gyldne Golfbold (Golden Golfball), an annual award bestowed by the Danish Golf Union to the best performance by a Danish golfer.

On her LET Access Series debut in 2022, she won the Smørum Ladies Open at her home club in Denmark.

Later in 2022, Leth-Nissen enrolled at Oklahoma State University and started playing with the Oklahoma State Cowgirls golf team, but left after a year to purse a law degree in Denmark instead, and play on the LET Access Series concurrently.

== Professional career ==
Leth-Nissen turned professional mid-2024 and continued to play on the LET Access Series. In 2026, she held a three-stroke lead going into the final round of the Madaëf Golfs Ladies Open, but ultimately finished 3rd. She was runner-up at the Swedish Strokeplay Championship, two strokes behind Norway's Silje Torvund Ohma, following an untimely double bogey on the penultimate hole.

== Amateur wins ==
- 2019 DGU Elite Tour II, Danish National Girls Championship, The Royal Trophy
- 2020 Dragør Pokalen
- 2021 Molleaen Open, Danish International Ladies Amateur Championship
- 2023 European Ladies' Club Trophy

== Professional wins (1) ==
=== LET Access Series wins (1) ===
No.	Date	Tournament	Winning score	To par	Margin of victory	Runners-up	Ref
1	17 Jun 2022	Smørum Ladies Open (as an amateur)	70-68-70=208	−2	4 strokes	(Denmark) Natacha Høst Husted (a) (Denmark) Amalie Leth-Nissen (a)	

== Team appearances ==
Amateur

- Duke of York Young Champions Trophy (representing Denmark): 2019
- European Girls' Team Championship (representing Denmark): 2019 (winners), 2020
- European Ladies' Team Championship (representing Denmark): 2022, 2023, 2024
- European Nations Cup – Copa Sotogrande (representing Denmark): 2023, 2024
- Espirito Santo Trophy (representing Denmark): 2023
