= La Reserva de Sotogrande Invitational =

Tournament information
- Location: Costa del Sol, Spain
- Established: 2019
- Course: La Reserva Club de Sotogrande
- Par: 72
- Tour: Ladies European Tour
- Format: Stroke play
- Prize fund: €300,000
- Month played: May

Current champion
- (France) Céline Herbin

The La Reserva de Sotogrande Invitational is a professional golf tournament on the Ladies European Tour, first played in 2019.

The tournament is played in Spain at La Reserva Club de Sotogrande, southwest of Marbella on Costa del Sol. It was the first Ladies European Tour event held in Europe in the 2019 season.

== Winners ==
Year	Winner	Country	Score	Winner's share (€)	Runner-up
2019	Céline Herbin	France	282 (−6)	45,000	(Germany) Esther Henseleit
