= Tiia Koivisto =

Finnish professional golfer (born 1994)

Personal information
- Nationality: Finland
- Born: 6 February 1994 (age 32) Mäntsälä, Finland

Career
- Sport: Golf
- Turned professional: 2016
- Current tour: LET (joined 2021)
- Former tour: LET Access Series (joined 2017)
- Professional wins: 2

Number of wins by tour
- Ladies European Tour: 1
- Other: 1

Best results in LPGA major championships
- Chevron Championship: DNP
- Women's PGA C'ship: DNP
- U.S. Women's Open: DNP
- Women's British Open: CUT: 2022, 2023
- Evian Championship: CUT: 2022

Achievements and awards
- LET Access Series Order of Merit: 2020

Tiia Koivisto (born 6 February 1994) is a Finnish professional golfer who plays on the Ladies European Tour (LET). She won the 2022 Jabra Ladies Open. In 2020, she topped the LETAS Order of Merit after winning the Czech Ladies Challenge.

== Career ==
Koivisto was born in Mäntsälä in the greater Helsinki area and grew up next to the Hirvihaaran Golf Course. She only took up golf at the age of 15 after playing soccer for most of her childhood, first for the boys' team as a defender and then later in the women's as a striker.

In 2016, she won the Finnish Match Play and finished third in the Finnish Stroke Play Championship.

Koivisto turned professional in late 2016 after attending LET Q-School, and started playing on the LET Access Series in 2017. She has enjoyed steady progress, with two top-10 finishes in her first season at the Azores Ladies Open and the Castellum Ladies Open, a solo third finish at the Anna Nordqvist Västerås Open in 2018, to five top-10 finishes in 2019. In 2020, she finished T11 at the Australian Ladies Classic and won the Czech Ladies Challenge to top the LETAS Order of Merit, earning promotion to the Ladies European Tour. She finished the year with a scoring average of 69.6.

In 2021, she finished T7 at the Aramco Team Series – Sotogrande and made the cut in her first LPGA Tour-sanctioned event, the ISPS Handa World Invitational in Ireland.

In 2022, she won the Jabra Ladies Open, held at the Evian Resort Golf Club in France, after beating Whitney Hillier of Australia in a playoff with a birdie on the first extra hole. With her victory, Koivisto earned a place in the field for The Amundi Evian Championship, her first major.

== Amateur wins ==
- 2014 Audi Finnish Tour Karsinta
- 2016 Finnish Match Play

== Professional wins (2) ==
=== Ladies European Tour wins (1) ===
No.	Date	Tournament	Winning score	Margin of victory	Runner-up
1	21 May 2022	Jabra Ladies Open	−6 (72-69-66=207)	Playoff	(Australia) Whitney Hillier

Ladies European Tour playoff record (1–0)

No.	Year	Tournament	Opponent	Result
1	2022	Jabra Ladies Open	(Australia) Whitney Hillier	Won with birdie on first extra hole

=== LET Access Series wins (1) ===
No.	Date	Tournament	Winning score	Margin of victory	Runner-up	Ref
1	18 Sep 2020	Amundi Czech Ladies Challenge	−9 (68-71-68=207)	2 strokes	(England) Cara Gainer	
