= Sherry Golf Jerez =

Golf course in Andalusia, Spain

- Interactive map of Sherry Golf Jerez
- 36.65954419°N 6.154876°W

Club information
- Location: Jerez, Cádiz, Spain
- Type: Private

Sherry Golf Jerez is a golf course located in Jerez de la Frontera in Andalusia, Spain.

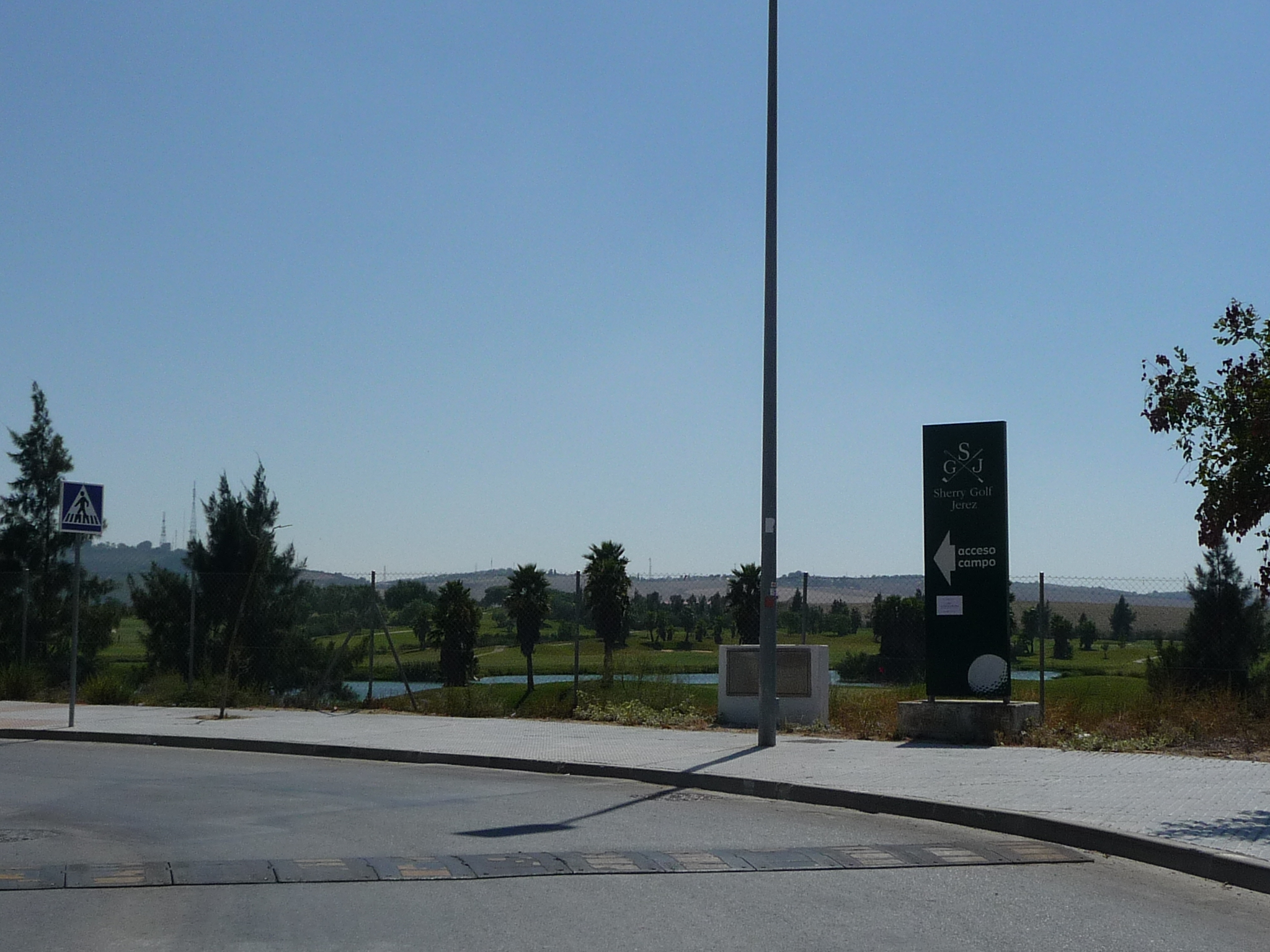
View of the course

== Design ==
The course was designed by Stirling&Martin (Global Golf Company)

== Events ==
Since 2006 hosts the 2nd classification phase for the European PGA
