= Sára Kousková =

Czech professional golfer (born 1999)

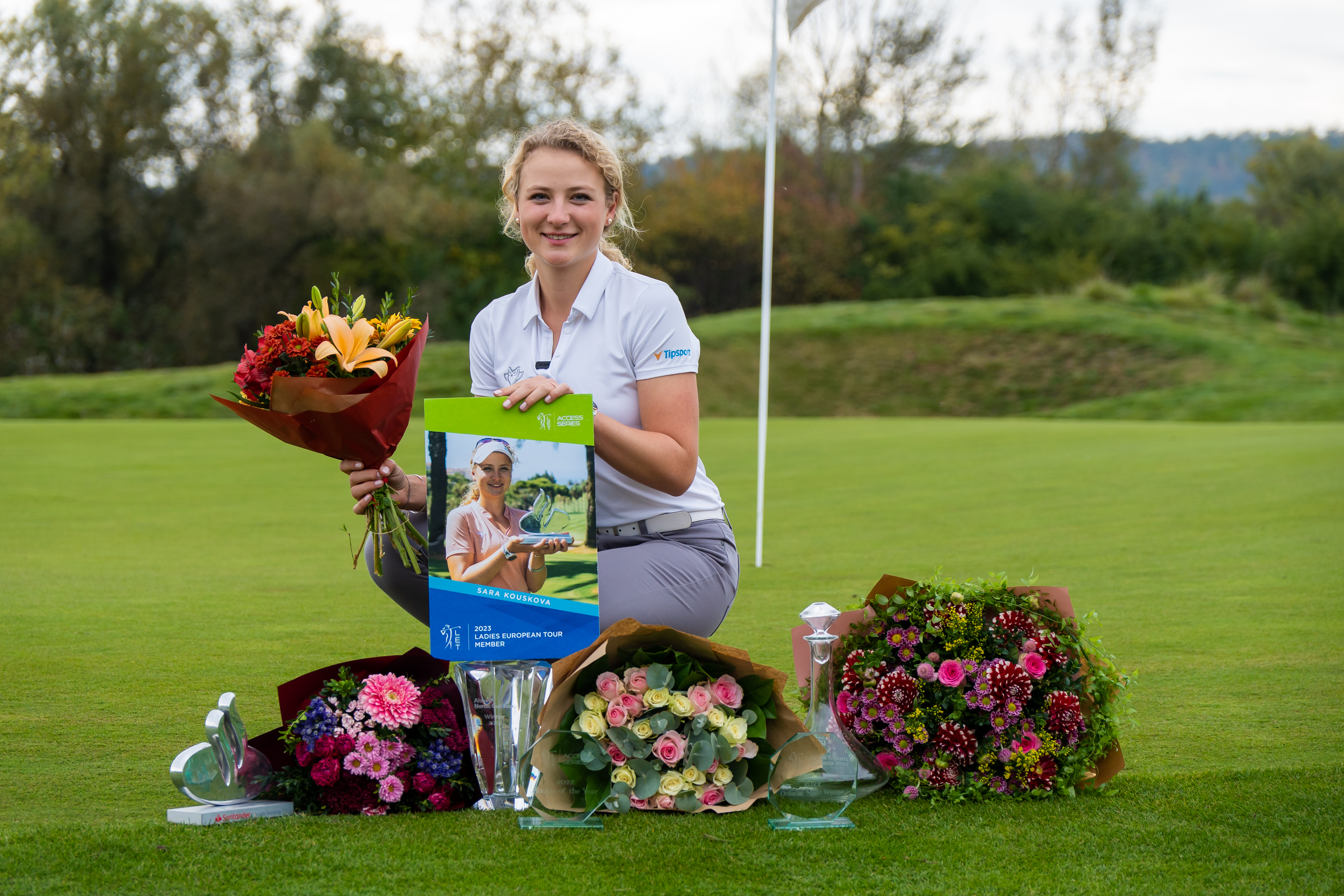

Personal information
- Nationality: Czech Republic
- Born: 2 July 1999 (age 27) Karlovy Vary, Czech Republic
- Height: 170 cm (5 ft 7 in)

Career
- Sport: Golf
- College: University of Texas at Austin
- Turned professional: 2022
- Current tour: Ladies European Tour (joined 2023)
- Former tour: LET Access Series (joined 2022)
- Professional wins: 6

Number of wins by tour
- Ladies European Tour: 2
- Other: 4

Best results in LPGA major championships
- Chevron Championship: DNP
- Women's PGA C'ship: DNP
- U.S. Women's Open: DNP
- Women's British Open: T12: 2026
- Evian Championship: T57: 2026

Achievements and awards
- Edith Cummings Munson Golf Award: 2021
- LET Access Series Order of Merit winner: 2022
- LET Access Series Rookie of the Year: 2022

Sára Kousková (born 2 July 1999) is a Czech professional golfer and Ladies European Tour player. In 2021 she won the Amundi Czech Ladies Challenge to become the first Czech amateur to win a professional event. In October 2022 she continued creating Czech golf history with first ever Czech female win of the LET Access Series Order of Merit.

== Early life and amateur career ==
Kousková was born in Prague and began playing golf when she was five years old. At six, she won her first tournament at a pitch and putt course. She became a member of the Czech National Team in 2013, and became the top-ranked U18 golfer in the Czech Republic. She has represented her country at the European Girls' Team Championship four times, securing a fourth-place finish in 2016. She has also played in four European Ladies' Team Championships, and at the 2018 Espirito Santo Trophy in Ireland.

In 2015, she won the Austrian International Ladies Amateur and was runner-up at the Czech International Ladies Amateur Championship. She finished in the top-10 at the European Ladies Amateur Championship in 2017, 2018 and 2020, and she advanced to the quarterfinals at the Ladies' British Open Amateur Championship in 2017, 2018 and 2019. She competed at the 2022 Augusta National Women's Amateur.

In 2018, Kousková enrolled at the University of Texas at Austin and joined the Texas Longhorns women's golf team. As a junior, she won the Arizona Wildcat Invitational and helped the Longhorns advance to the quarterfinals and a tie for fifth place at the NCAA Championships.

In 2021, Kousková won the Amundi Czech Ladies Challenge. She made history as she became the first ever Czech player to win a LET Access Series event and the first Czech amateur to win a professional event.

Kousková finished sixth at the Ladies European Tour Q-School to earn a full card for 2022. However, despite securing status on the LET, Kousková decided not to take up membership and instead finish her education in Texas and complete her final NCAA season.

== Professional career ==
Kousková turned professional in May 2022 and almost defended her title at the Amundi Czech Ladies Challenge in her first professional start, finishing runner up behind Chiara Noja.

At the Santander Golf Tour Málaga in July 2022, she started the final day four shots behind the leader Virginia Elena Carta of Italy and produced a final score of 67 to win by one stroke over Carta, and seal her second victory on the LET Access Series.

In September 2022, she won two LET Access Series tournaments back-to-back in Sweden (Elite Hotels Open) and Switzerland (ASGI Lavaux Ladies Open).

In October 2022, she became a first ever Czech female golfer to win the Order of Merit title of one of the world's professional tours. In addition to winning the LETAS Order of Merit, she was also named Rookie of the Year, and topped the LETAS Money List.

She finished 19th in the 2024 LET Order of Merit, and captured her maiden LET title at the 2025 Jabra Ladies Open in France.

== Amateur wins ==
- 2014 Czech Amateur Tour 1
- 2015 Austrian International Amateur
- 2016 IMG Academy Junior World Championship, Slovak Amateur Championship
- 2018 Czech International Junior U18 & 21 Championship
- 2020 Czech Amateur Tour 2, Czech International Junior U18 and 21 Championship
- 2021 Arizona Wildcat Invitational

== Professional wins (6) ==
=== Ladies European Tour wins (2) ===
No.	Date	Tournament	Winning score	To par	Margin of victory	Runner-up
1	24 May 2025	Jabra Ladies Open	66-70-67=203	−10	2 strokes	(Singapore) Shannon Tan
2	8 Jun 2025	Tenerife Women's Open	71-68-69-71=279	−9	1 stroke	(Germany) Helen Briem

=== LET Access Series wins (4) ===
No.	Date	Tournament	Winning score	To par	Margin of victory	Runner-up
1	5 Jun 2021	Amundi Czech Ladies Challenge (as an amateur)	64-67-71=202	−14	8 strokes	(Russia) Nina Pegova
2	23 Jul 2022	Santander Golf Tour Málaga	74-70-67=211	−5	1 stroke	(Italy) Virginia Elena Carta
3	2 Sep 2022	Elite Hotels Open	65-67-66=198	−12	3 strokes	(Switzerland) Vanessa Knecht (a)
4	16 Sep 2022	ASGI Lavaux Ladies Open	70-67-67=204	−12	4 strokes	(Germany) Helen Briem (a)

== Results in LPGA majors ==
Tournament	2025	2026
Chevron Championship		
U.S. Women's Open		
Women's PGA Championship		
The Evian Championship	CUT	T57
Women's British Open	CUT	T12

Did not play

CUT = missed the half-way cut
T = tied

== Team appearances ==
Amateur

- European Girls' Team Championship (representing Czech Republic): 2014, 2015, 2016, 2017
- European Ladies' Team Championship (representing Czech Republic): 2018, 2019, 2020, 2021
- World Junior Girls Championship (representing Czech Republic): 2017
- Espirito Santo Trophy (representing Czech Republic): 2018
