= 2020 LET Access Series =

Professional women's golf tour

2020 LET Access Series season
- Duration: August 2020 – October 2020
- Number of official events: 5
- Most wins: 2: (France) Agathe Laisné (a)
- Order of Merit winner: (Finland) Tiia Koivisto

The 2020 LET Access Series was a series of professional women's golf tournaments held from August through October 2020 across Europe. The LET Access Series is the second-tier women's professional golf tour in Europe and is the official developmental tour of the Ladies European Tour.

== Tournament results ==
The 2020 schedule was severely impacted by the COVID-19 pandemic with many tournaments either being postponed or cancelled. The table below shows the revised 2020 schedule released mid-year. The numbers in brackets after the winners' names show the number of career wins they had on the LET Access Series up to and including that event.

Dates	Tournament	Location	Prize fund (€)	Winner	WWGR points
~~20–22 Aug~~	Tegelberga Open	Sweden	40,000	Removed (Note: Removed from LETAS schedule due to COVID-19 pandemic. Tournament played as Nordic Golf Tour event.)	–
~~28–30 Aug~~	Skaftö Open	Sweden	60,000	Removed	–
3–5 Sep	Flumserberg Ladies Open	Switzerland	40,000	(Finland) Sanna Nuutinen (3)	2
16–18 Sep	Amundi Czech Ladies Challenge	Czech Republic	37,500	(Finland) Tiia Koivisto (1)	2
23–25 Sep	Lavaux Ladies Open	Switzerland	40,000	(France) Agathe Laisné (a, 1)	2
~~8–10 Oct~~	Terre Blanche Ladies Open	France	40,000	Cancelled (Note: Initially rescheduled from April 3-5, later cancelled due to COVID-19 pandemic.)	–
14–16 Oct	Santander Golf Tour Lerma	Spain	35,000	(Spain) Luna Sobrón (3)	2
~~30 Sep – 2 Oct~~; 20–22 Oct	Santander Golf Tour Lauro (Note: Weather-shortened to 36 holes)	Spain	35,000	(France) Agathe Laisné (a, 2)	2

== Order of Merit rankings ==
The top player on the LETAS Order of Merit earned full LET membership for the 2021 Ladies European Tour.

Rank	Player	Country	Events	Points
1	Tiia Koivisto	Finland	5	13,610
2	Cara Gainer	England	5	7,268
3	Luna Sobrón	Spain	2	6,933
4	Sanna Nuutinen	Finland	3	6,526
5	Agathe Sauzon	France	3	6,050
6	Pia Babnik	Slovenia	3	5,150
7	Anaelle Carnet	France	4	5,130
8	Rachael Taylor	Scotland	4	4,663
9	Mireia Prat	Spain	5	4,479
10	Naueon Eum	South Korea	5	4,383

Earned membership for the 2021 Ladies European Tour.

== See also ==
- 2020 Ladies European Tour
- 2020 in golf
