= Västerås Ladies Open =

Golf tournament

Coordinates: 59.663°N 16.839°E

Tournament information
- Location: Västerås, Sweden
- Established: 2018
- Course: Skerike Golf Club
- Par: 72
- Tours: LET Access Series; Swedish Golf Tour
- Format: Stroke play
- Prize fund: €45,000
- Month played: July

Tournament record score
- Aggregate: 208 Nayeon Eum, Puk Lyng Thomsen, Ragga Kristinsdóttir
- To par: −8 as above

Current champion
- (Iceland) Ragga Kristinsdóttir

Location map
- Location in Europe

The Västerås Ladies Open is a women's professional golf tournament on the Swedish Golf Tour and LET Access Series, played since 2018 in Västerås, Sweden.

== History ==
Between 2018 and 2021 the tournament was hosted by Anna Nordqvist, a multiple major championship winner with roots in nearby Eskilstuna.

In 2022 the tournament moved from Västerås Golf Club to Orresta Golf Club. Lynn University Sophomore Sara Ericsson won on the first extra hole in a play-off with New Zealand's Hanee Song.

== Winners ==
Year	Tours	Winner	Country	Score	Margin of victory	Runner-up	Venue	Ref
Västerås Ladies Open by MoreGolf Mastercard
2025	LETAS · SGT	Ragga Kristinsdóttir	Iceland	−8 (65-70-73=208)	1 stroke	(Denmark) Amalie Leth-Nissen	Skerike GC	
2024: No tournament
Västerås Ladies Open By Elite Hotels
2023	LETAS · SGT	Puk Lyng Thomsen	Denmark	−8 (69-66-73=208)	4 strokes	(Sweden) Kajsa Arwefjäll (a)	Fullerö GC	
Västerås Ladies Open Presented By PadelPitch
2022	LETAS · SGT	Sara Ericsson (a)	Sweden	−6 (70-67-73=210)	Playoff	(New Zealand) Hanee Song	Orresta GC	
Anna Nordqvist Västerås Open By SmartProvider
2021	LETAS · SGT	Nayeon Eum	South Korea	−8 (66-70-72=208)	3 strokes	(England) Lily May Humphreys	Västerås GC	
2020	LETAS · SGT	Cancelled due to the COVID-19 pandemic						
2019	LETAS · SGT	Annelie Sjöholm	Sweden	−6 (70-72-68=210)	1 stroke	(Sweden) Maja Stark (a)	Västerås GC	
Anna Nordqvist Västerås Open
2018	LETAS · SGT	Emie Peronnin	France	−5 (72-69-70=211)	2 strokes	(Sweden) Maja Stark (a)	Västerås GC	

== See also ==
- Västerås Open – men's Challenge Tour event
