= Chiara Noja =

German professional golfer (born 2006)

Personal information
- Nationality: Germany
- Born: 16 March 2006 (age 20) Berlin, Germany
- Height: 6 ft 0 in (1.83 m)

Career
- Sport: Golf
- Turned professional: 2021
- Current tour: Ladies European Tour
- Former tour: LET Access Series
- Professional wins: 2

Number of wins by tour
- Ladies European Tour: 1
- Other: 1

Best results in LPGA major championships
- Chevron Championship: DNP
- Women's PGA C'ship: DNP
- U.S. Women's Open: DNP
- Women's British Open: CUT: 2023
- Evian Championship: CUT: 2023

Chiara Noja (born 16 March 2006) is a German professional golfer who plays on the Ladies European Tour. She turned professional in October 2021 at age 15. On 5 June 2022, Noja secured her maiden professional win at the Amundi Czech Ladies Challenge by 9 strokes. Six months later she became the youngest professional winner on the Ladies European Tour (LET), capturing the Aramco Team Series – Jeddah on 12 November 2022.

== Early life ==
Noja was born in 2006 in Berlin, Germany, and emigrated to England at the age of seven. Since 2020 she lives with her parents in Dubai, United Arab Emirates.

== Amateur career ==
Noja showed her talent for the game in a very young age with winning several tournaments. Becoming a single-digit handicap golfer by 9, a scratch golfer by 12, and at 13 she topped the European rankings in the under-14 age group. Following her tied-ninth finish at the 2020 Women's Amateur Championship, she made her Ladies European Tour (LET) debut as a 14-year-old at the 2020 Omega Dubai Moonlight Classic.

In 2021, due to COVID-19 pandemic travel restrictions, Noja started playing on the LET Access Series to replace the amateur events she couldn't travel to. She finished 8th at the 2021 PGA Championship and led the Golf Flanders LETAS Trophy in Antwerp, Belgium ahead of the final round, but shot a 73 and finished runner-up behind Lily May Humphreys.

== Professional career ==
Noja turned professional in October 2021 (with a handicap of +7.4), at 15 years old after she received sponsor invitations to the Dubai Moonlight Classic, Aramco Saudi Ladies International, and the Aramco Team Series – Jeddah, missing none of the cuts. She was ineligible to attend LET Qualifying School in December 2021, as she did not meet the tour's minimum age requirement of 16. However, she received sponsor invitations to the Aramco Saudi Ladies International and all five Aramco Team Series events of 2022.

=== 2022: First wins ===
Noja began her 2022 season at the Aramco Saudi Ladies International, where she finished 13th, followed by a second place at the Terre Blanche Ladies Open. She recorded her maiden professional win at the Amundi Czech Ladies Challenge in June 2022, after shooting rounds of 65-68-71 for a 9 stroke victory, and rose to the top of the LET Access Series Order of Merit. After 1 win, 2 seconds, 3 thirds and 4 fourth to tenth places, missing none of the cuts in 13 LET Access Series events on 16 September, Noja secured her LET Tour card for the 2023 season by finishing second on the Order of Merit. Noja won her first Ladies European Tour (LET) title on 12 November 2022 by winning the Aramco Team Series (individual event) at Jeddah, Saudi Arabia. She defeated Charley Hull on the second hole of a sudden-death playoff after both players finished regulation play at −13. She finished the season ninth for lowest stroke average and first for the average driving distance in the LET Rankings.

=== 2023: Continued success ===
Noja began her 2023 season in February at the Lalla Meryem Cup where she finished 11th, followed by a 12th place at the Aramco Saudi Ladies International where she won her biggest-ever career prize money of $102,500 with rounds of 71-70-65-70 (−12), including three eagles. On 8 March, Noja broke the course record at the LET South African Women's Open at Steenberg Golf Club in Cape Town. Her round of 62, ten under par, was the lowest in her professional career. She finished the tournament in third place with rounds of 62-71-69-69 (−17). On 9 June, Noja played her first LPGA tournament after receiving a sponsor's exemption for the ShopRite LPGA Classic and finished tied for 12th.

== Professional wins (2) ==
=== Ladies European Tour wins (1) ===
No.	Date	Tournament	Winning score	To par	Margin of victory	Runner-up	Winner's share ($)
1	12 Nov 2022	Aramco Team Series – Jeddah (individual event)	68-70-65=203	−13	Playoff	(England) Charley Hull	77,134.28

Ladies European Tour playoff record (1–0)

No.	Year	Tournament	Opponent	Result
1	2022	Aramco Team Series – Jeddah	(England) Charley Hull	Won with birdie on second extra hole

=== LET Access Series wins (1) ===
Date	Tournament	Score	Margin of victory	Runner-up	Winner's share ($)
5 Jun 2022	Amundi Czech Ladies Challenge	−12 (65-68-71=204)	9 strokes	(Czech Republic) Sára Kousková	6,431.80

== World ranking ==
Position in Women's World Golf Rankings at the end of each calendar year.

Year	Ranking	Source
2020	1144	
2021	598	
2022	130	
2023	138	
2024	534	
