= Czech Ladies Open =

Golf tournament in Beroun, Czech Republic

Tipsport Czech Ladies Open

Tournament information
- Location: Beroun, Czech Republic
- Established: 2019
- Course: Beroun Golf Club
- Par: 72
- Tours: Ladies European Tour; LET Access Series (2019)
- Format: Stroke play
- Prize fund: €350,000
- Month played: June

Tournament record score
- Aggregate: 198 Noora Komulainen
- To par: −18 as above

Current champion
- (Finland) Noora Komulainen

The Czech Ladies Open is a professional golf tournament on the Ladies European Tour, first played in 2019.

The tournament is played in Beroun just outside Prague, Czech Republic. The inaugural event was held at Karlštejn Golf Resort, overlooked by Karlštejn Castle and host to the 1997 Czech Open. For the 2019 season it became the second dual ranking event with LET on the LET Access Series, after the Jabra Ladies Open.

== Winners ==
Year	Tour(s)	Winner	Country	Score	Margin of victory	Winner's share (€)	Runner(s)-up	Venue
2026	LET	Noora Komulainen	Finland	198 (−18)	Playoff	52,500	(Australia) Justice Bosio (Sweden) Lisa Pettersson	Beroun Golf Club
2025	LET	Casandra Alexander	South Africa	199 (−17)	2 strokes	45,000	(England) Esme Hamilton (Spain) Luna Sobrón	Beroun Golf Club
2024	LET	Marta Martín	Spain	199 (−17)	4 strokes	45,000	(England) Rosie Davies	Beroun Golf Club
2023	LET	Diksha Dagar	India	203 (−13)	4 strokes	45,000	(Thailand) Trichat Cheenglab	Beroun Golf Club
2022	LET	Jana Melichová (a)	Czech Republic	202 (−14)	1 stroke	30,000	(Czech Republic) Klára Spilková (Denmark) Nicole Broch Estrup	Beroun Golf Club
2021	LET	Atthaya Thitikul	Thailand	201 (−15)	1 stroke	30,000	(Spain) Nuria Iturrioz	Beroun Golf Club
2020	LET	Emily Kristine Pedersen	Denmark	199 (−17)	4 strokes	30,000	(Austria) Christine Wolf	Beroun Golf Club
2019	LET · LETAS	Carly Booth	Scotland	207 (−9)	1 stroke	19,200	(England) Hayley Davis (France) Anais Meyssonnier (Finland) Sanna Nuutinen (England) Charlotte Thompson	Karlštejn Golf Resort
