= 2019 Women's PGA Championship =

Tournament information
- Dates: June 20–23, 2019
- Location: Chaska, Minnesota; 44.834°N 93.591°W
- Course: Hazeltine National Golf Club
- Organized by: PGA of America
- Tour: LPGA Tour
- Format: Stroke play - 72 holes

Statistics
- Par: 72
- Length: 6,831 yards (6,246 m)
- Field: 156 players, 80 after cut
- Cut: 149 (+5)
- Prize fund: $3.85 million
- Winner's share: $577,500

Champion
- (Australia) Hannah Green
- 279 (−9)
- Location in the United States Location in Minnesota

The 2019 Women's PGA Championship (branded as the 2019 KPMG Women's PGA Championship for sponsorship reasons) was the 65th Women's PGA Championship, played June 20–23 at Hazeltine National Golf Club in Chaska, Minnesota. It was the third of five major championships on the LPGA Tour during the 2019 season.

Australian Hannah Green won by one stroke over defending champion Park Sung-hyun, in her first victory in both a women's major and the LPGA Tour. It was the first wire-to-wire win at the Women's PGA Championship since Yani Tseng in 2011 and the first major win by an Australian since Karrie Webb at the 2006 Kraft Nabisco Championship.

== Field ==
The field includes 156 players who met one or more of the selection criteria and commit to participate by a designated deadline. Players who qualified for the Championship are listed below. Players are listed under the first category in which they qualified; additional qualifying categories are shown in parentheses.

1. Active LPGA Hall of Fame members

Laura Davies (2), Karrie Webb (2,12)

2. Past winners of the Women's PGA Championship

Shanshan Feng (4,6,12), Brooke Henderson (3,4,5,6,12), Danielle Kang (3,4,6,9,12), Cristie Kerr (4,9,12), Anna Nordqvist (3,4,9,12), Inbee Park (3,4,6,12), Park Sung-hyun (3,4,5,6,12)

- Juli Inkster, Suzann Pettersen, and Yani Tseng did not play.

3. Professionals who have won an LPGA major championship in the previous five years and during the current year

Chun In-gee (4,6,12), Georgia Hall (4,6,9,12), Ariya Jutanugarn (4,6,12), Kim Hyo-joo (12), In-Kyung Kim (4,5,6,12), Ko Jin-young (4,6,12), Lydia Ko (4,6,12), Brittany Lang (9,12), Lee Jeong-eun (4,6,12), Pernilla Lindberg (4,12), Ryu So-yeon (4,5,6,12), Angela Stanford (4,12), Lexi Thompson (4,6,9,12), Michelle Wie (4,9,12)

- Mo Martin (12) did not play.
- Brittany Lincicome (4,9,12) will be on maternity leave and use (11) in 2020.

4. Professionals who have won an official LPGA tournament in the previous two calendar years and during the current year

Marina Alex (6,12), Céline Boutier (12), Nasa Hataoka (5,6,12), Ji Eun-hee (6,12), Moriya Jutanugarn (6,12), Kim Sei-young (6,12), Katherine Kirk (12), Jessica Korda (5,6,12), Nelly Korda (6,12), Bronte Law (12), Lee Mi-hyang (12), Minjee Lee (6,12), Mirim Lee (12), Stacy Lewis (9,12), Gaby López (12), Haru Nomura (12), Annie Park (12), Amy Yang (6,12)

- Jang Ha-na did not play.

5. Professionals who finished top-10 and ties at the previous year's Women's PGA Championship

Jacqui Concolino (12), Charley Hull (6,9,12), Lizette Salas (6,9,12), Angel Yin (9,12)

6. Professionals ranked No. 1-30 on the Women's World Golf Rankings as of May 21, 2019

Carlota Ciganda (9,12)

- Ahn Sun-ju, Choi Hye-jin, Jiyai Shin, and Ai Suzuki did not play

7. The top eight finishers at the 2018 LPGA T&CP National Championship

Joanna Coe, Alison Curdt, Wendy Doolan, Stephanie Eiswerth, Ashley Grier, Nicole Jeray, Kang Ji-min, Seul-Ki Park

8. The top finisher (not otherwise qualified via the 2018 LPGA T&CP National Championship) at the 2019 PGA Women's Stroke Play Championship

Brittany Kelly

9. Members of the European and United States Solheim Cup teams in 2017

Paula Creamer (12), Austin Ernst (12), Jodi Ewart Shadoff (12), Karine Icher, Caroline Masson (12), Catriona Matthew, Emily Kristine Pedersen, Gerina Piller (12), Mel Reid (12), Madelene Sagström (12)

- Florentyna Parker did not play.

10. Maximum of two sponsor invites

Nuria Iturrioz, Leona Maguire

11. Any player who did not compete in the 2018 KPMG Women's PGA Championship due to maternity, provided she was otherwise qualified to compete.

12. LPGA members who have committed to the event, ranked in the order of their position on the 2019 official money list through the conclusion of the Meijer LPGA Classic

Brittany Altomare, Pajaree Anannarukarn, Dottie Ardina, Aditi Ashok, Laetitia Beck, Nicole Broch Larsen, Ashleigh Buhai, Sarah Burnham, Tiffany Chan, Pei-Yun Chien, Chella Choi, Choi Na-yeon, Karen Chung, Daniela Darquea, Brianna Do, Gemma Dryburgh, Lindy Duncan, Kendall Dye, María Fassi, Dana Finkelstein, Isi Gabsa, Sandra Gal, Kristen Gillman, Laura Gonzalez Escallon, Hannah Green, Jaye Marie Green, Clariss Guce, Mina Harigae, Caroline Hedwall, Daniela Holmqvist, Wei-Ling Hsu, M. J. Hur, Tiffany Joh, Haeji Kang, Kim Kaufman, Sarah Kemp, Megan Khang, Christina Kim, Cheyenne Knight, P.K. Kongkraphan, Jennifer Kupcho, Alison Lee, Jaclyn Lee, Lee Jeong-eun, Lin Xiyu, Yu Liu, Lee Lopez, Nanna Koerstz Madsen, Ally McDonald, Stephanie Meadow, Wichanee Meechai, Giulia Molinaro, Azahara Muñoz, Su-Hyun Oh, Amy Olson, Ryann O'Toole, Lee-Anne Pace, Park Hee-young, Jane Park, Katherine Perry, Pornanong Phatlum, Morgan Pressel, Louise Ridderström, Sarah Schmelzel, Alena Sharp, Jenny Shin, Luna Sobrón Galmés, Jennifer Song, Klára Spilková, Mariah Stackhouse, Marissa Steen, Lauren Stephenson, Linnea Strom, Thidapa Suwannapura, Elizabeth Szokol, Emma Talley, Kris Tamulis, Anne-Catherine Tanguay, Pannarat Thanapolboonyaras, Charlotte Thomas, Maria Torres, Ayako Uehara, Mariajo Uribe, Anne Van Dam, Lindsey Weaver, Suzuka Yamaguchi, Jing Yan, Sakura Yokomine, Pavarisa Yoktuan

- Beatriz Recari and Sarah Jane Smith did not play.

13. The remainder of the field will be filled by members who have committed to the event, ranked in the order of their position on the 2019 LPGA Priority List as of the commitment deadline

None needed

== Round summaries ==
=== First round ===
Thursday, June 20, 2019

Hannah Green shot a 4-under-par 68 to take a one stroke lead over Kim Hyo-joo and Mel Reid. Changing weather conditions led to only 16 players breaking par and 20 players shooting scores in the 80s.

Place	Player	Score	To par
1	(Australia) Hannah Green	68	−4
T2	(South Korea) Kim Hyo-joo	69	−3
T2	(England) Mel Reid	69	−3
T4	(Thailand) Ariya Jutanugarn	70	−2
T4	(South Korea) In-Kyung Kim	70	−2
T4	(China) Lin Xiyu	70	−2
T4	(United States) Annie Park	70	−2
T4	(South Korea) Park Sung-hyun	70	−2
T4	(South Korea) Amy Yang	70	−2
T10	(South Korea) Chella Choi	71	−1
T10	(Spain) Carlota Ciganda	71	−1
T10	(Thailand) Moriya Jutanugarn	71	−1
T10	(New Zealand) Lydia Ko	71	−1
T10	(South Korea) Mirim Lee	71	−1
T10	(South Korea) Ryu So-yeon	71	−1
T10	(United States) Angel Yin	71	−1

=== Second round ===
Friday, June 21, 2019

Place	Player	Score	To par
1	(Australia) Hannah Green	68-69=137	−7
2	(Thailand) Ariya Jutanugarn	70-70=140	−4
T3	(New Zealand) Lydia Ko	71-70=141	−3
T3	(South Korea) Park Sung-hyun	70-71=141	−3
T5	(United States) Nelly Korda	72-70=142	−2
T5	(United States) Angel Yin	71-71=142	−2
T7	(Sweden) Caroline Hedwall	72-71=143	−1
T7	(Spain) Nuria Iturrioz	73-70=143	−1
T7	(Thailand) Moriya Jutanugarn	71-72=143	−1
T7	(South Korea) Kang Ji-min	73-70=143	−1
T7	(South Korea) Kim Hyo-joo	69-74=143	−1
T7	(China) Lin Xiyu	70-73=143	−1
T7	(Sweden) Pernilla Lindberg	72-71=143	−1
T7	(United States) Lizette Salas	72-71=143	−1
T7	(United States) Lexi Thompson	72-71=143	−1

=== Third round ===
Saturday, June 22, 2019

Place	Player	Score	To par
1	(Australia) Hannah Green	68-69-70=207	−9
2	(Thailand) Ariya Jutanugarn	70-70-68=208	−8
T3	(United States) Nelly Korda	72-70-69=211	−5
T3	(United States) Lizette Salas	72-71-68=211	−5
T5	(South Korea) Kim Sei-young	73-72-67=212	−4
T5	(South Korea) Park Sung-hyun	70-71-71=212	−4
T7	(United States) Danielle Kang	75-70-68=213	−3
T7	(South Korea) Inbee Park	72-73-68=213	−3
T7	(United States) Lauren Stephenson	72-73-68=213	−3
T7	(South Korea) Amy Yang	70-74-69=213	−3
T7	(United States) Angel Yin	71-71-71=213	−3

=== Final round ===
Sunday, June 23, 2019

Place	Player	Score	To par	Prize money (US$)
1	(Australia) Hannah Green	68-69-70-72=279	−9	577,500
2	(South Korea) Park Sung-hyun	70-71-71-68=280	−8	349,816
T3	(United States) Nelly Korda	72-70-69-71=282	−6	225,038
T3	(England) Mel Reid	69-76-71-66=282	−6	225,038
T5	(United States) Danielle Kang	75-70-68-70=283	−5	143,642
T5	(United States) Lizette Salas	72-71-68-72=283	−5	143,642
T7	(South Korea) Kim Hyo-joo	69-74-71-70=284	−4	96,081
T7	(South Korea) Mirim Lee	71-74-70-69=284	−4	96,081
T7	(South Korea) Inbee Park	72-73-68-71=284	−4	96,081
T10	(Thailand) Ariya Jutanugarn	70-70-68-77=285	−3	69,808
T10	(United States) Megan Khang	74-72-69-70=285	−3	69,808
T10	(New Zealand) Lydia Ko	71-70-76-68=285	−3	69,808
T10	(South Korea) Ryu So-yeon	71-75-71-68=285	−3	69,808

== Final round ratings ==
718 thousand on NBC, in the USA
