= 2019 Evian Championship =

Tournament information
- Dates: 25–28 July 2019
- Location: Évian-les-Bains, France; 46.394°N 6.570°E
- Course: Evian Resort Golf Club
- Tours: Ladies European Tour; LPGA Tour

Statistics
- Par: 71
- Length: 6,523 yards (5,965 m)
- Field: 120, 72 after cut
- Cut: 144 (+2)
- Prize fund: $4,100,000
- Winner's share: $615,000

Champion
- (South Korea) Ko Jin-young
- 269 (−15)

Location map
- Location in France Location in Auvergne-Rhône-Alpes

The 2019 Evian Championship was played 25–28 July at the Evian Resort Golf Club in Évian-les-Bains, France. It was the 26th Evian Championship (the first 20 played as the Evian Masters), and the seventh as a major championship on the LPGA Tour. The event was televised by Golf Channel and NBC Sports in the United States and Sky Sports in the United Kingdom.

Ko Jin-young won her second major of the year by two strokes over Shanshan Feng and Kim Hyo-joo. Earlier in the year, she won the 2019 ANA Inspiration.

== Field ==
The field for the tournament was set at 120, and most earned exemptions based on past performance on the Ladies European Tour, the LPGA Tour, or with a high ranking in the Women's World Golf Rankings.

There were 17 exemption categories for the 2019 Evian Championship.

1. Evian invitations (four)

María Fassi, Julie McCarthy (a), Yealimi Noh, Albane Valenzuela (a)

2. Top two from the Jabra Ladies Open

Annabel Dimmock (10), Pauline Roussin-Bouchard (a)

3. Top two players from the Island Resort Championship on the Symetra Tour

Cindy Ha, Daniela Iacobelli

4. Winner of the Hanwha Classic Evian Championship Asia Challenge

Ahn Shi-hyun

5. The top 40 in the Women's World Golf Rankings, as of 25 June 2019

Marina Alex, Choi Hye-jin, Chun In-gee (6,8,9), Carlota Ciganda, Austin Ernst (12), Shanshan Feng (9), Hannah Green (8,9), Georgia Hall (8), Nasa Hataoka (9), Brooke Henderson (8,9,12), Mamiko Higa, Charley Hull (10), Ji Eun-hee (9), Ariya Jutanugarn (8), Moriya Jutanugarn, Danielle Kang (8,9), Kim Hyo-joo (6), In-Kyung Kim (8), Kim Sei-young (9,12), Ko Jin-young (8,9), Lydia Ko (6,8,12), Jessica Korda (12), Nelly Korda (9), Bronte Law (9), Lee Jeong-eun (8,9,12), Lee Mi-hyang (12), Minjee Lee (9), Yu Liu, Azahara Muñoz, Inbee Park (7,8,12), Park Sung-hyun (8,9), Ryu So-yeon (8,12), Lizette Salas, Ai Suzuki, Lexi Thompson (9), Amy Yang (9), Angel Yin

- Ahn Sun-ju, Bae Seon-woo, and Jiyai Shin (7) did not play.

6. Past Evian Championship winners

Anna Nordqvist, Angela Stanford (12)

- Suzann Pettersen did not play.

7. Active Evian Masters Champions (must have played in 10 LPGA Tour or LET events from 25 July 2018 to 25 July 2019)

Paula Creamer, Laura Davies

- Karrie Webb did not play.

8. Winners of the other women's majors for the last five years

Brittany Lang, Pernilla Lindberg

- Brittany Lincicome did not play.

9. LPGA Tour winners since the 2018 Evian

Céline Boutier, Gaby López, Thidapa Suwannapura

- Cydney Clanton did not play.

10. LET winners since the 2018 Evian

Diksha Dagar, Céline Herbin, Nuria Iturrioz (11), Meghan MacLaren (11), Becky Morgan, Marianne Skarpnord (11), Anne Van Dam

- Atthaya Thitikul (a) did not play.

11. The top five on the LET Order of Merit, as of 16 July

Caroline Hedwall, Esther Henseleit

12. Top 10 and ties from the 2018 Evian Championship

Katherine Kirk, Amy Olson, Ryann O'Toole

- Mo Martin did not play.

13. 2018 U.S. Women's Amateur champion

Kristen Gillman forfeited her exemption by turning professional in November 2018. She qualified under category 17.

14. 2019 British Ladies Amateur champion

Emily Toy (a)

15. 2019 Women's Asia Pacific Championship champion

Yuka Yasuda (a)

16. Any player who qualified for the 2018 Evian but did not compete due to maternity

Stacy Lewis

17. LPGA Tour money list, as of 16 July (if needed to fill the field to 120)

Brittany Altomare, Pajaree Anannarukarn, Aditi Ashok, Nicole Broch Larsen, Ashleigh Buhai, Tiffany Chan, Chella Choi, Daniela Darquea, Lindy Duncan, Dana Finkelstein, Sandra Gal, Kristen Gillman, Jaye Marie Green, Mina Harigae, Wei-Ling Hsu, M. J. Hur, Tiffany Joh, Haeji Kang, Sarah Kemp, Cristie Kerr, Megan Khang, Jennifer Kupcho, Lee Jeong-eun, Mirim Lee, Lin Xiyu, Nanna Koerstz Madsen, Caroline Masson, Ally McDonald, Su-Hyun Oh, Annie Park, Pornanong Phatlum, Gerina Piller, Morgan Pressel, Melissa Reid, Madelene Sagström, Sarah Schmelzel, Alena Sharp, Jenny Shin, Jennifer Song, Mariah Stackhouse, Lauren Stephenson, Linnea Strom, Emma Talley, Charlotte Thomas, Maria Torres, Ayako Uehara, Mariajo Uribe, Jing Yan, Sakura Yokomine, Pavarisa Yoktuan

- Jodi Ewart Shadoff and Haru Nomura did not play.

== Course ==
Hole	1	2	3	4	5	6	7	8	9	Out	10	11	12	13	14	15	16	17	18	In	Total
Par	4	3	4	4	3	4	5	3	5	35	4	4	4	5	3	5	3	4	4	36	71
Yards	399	165	355	434	188	378	545	189	515	3,168	417	353	406	499	226	527	155	331	441	3,355	6,523
Metres	365	151	325	397	172	346	498	173	471	2,898	381	323	372	456	207	482	142	303	403	3,069	5,967

== Round summaries ==
=== First round ===
Thursday, 25 July 2019

Paula Creamer shot a 7-under-par 64 to lead by one stroke over four golfers. Defending champion Angela Stanford shot a 5-over 76.

Place	Player	Score	To par
1	(United States) Paula Creamer	64	−7
T2	(United States) Brittany Altomare	65	−6
T2	(South Korea) Ko Jin-young	65	−6
T2	(South Korea) Lee Mi-hyang	65	−6
T2	(South Korea) Inbee Park	65	−6
T6	(United States) Jennifer Kupcho	66	−5
T6	(England) Melissa Reid	66	−5
T8	(South Korea) Chella Choi	67	−4
T8	(United States) Austin Ernst	67	−4
T8	(South Korea) Park Sung-hyun	67	−4

=== Second round ===
Friday, 26 July 2019

Lee Mi-hyang shot a second round 67 to take a one-stroke lead over three fellow South Koreans. The round was interrupted by a weather delay in the late afternoon. First round leader Paula Creamer fell seven strokes in her first five holes after the delay and ended with a 76 to fall to −2 and T-24 for the tournament. Defending champion Angela Stanford missed the cut by six strokes.

Place	Player	Score	To par
1	(South Korea) Lee Mi-hyang	65-67=132	−10
T2	(South Korea) Kim Hyo-joo	69-64=133	−9
T2	(South Korea) Inbee Park	65-68=133	−9
T2	(South Korea) Park Sung-hyun	67-66=133	−9
5	(China) Shanshan Feng	69-66=135	−7
T6	(Thailand) Pajaree Anannarukarn	68-68=136	−6
T6	(Sweden) Caroline Hedwall	72-64=136	−6
T6	(South Korea) Kim Sei-young	68-68=136	−6
T6	(South Korea) Ko Jin-young	65-71=136	−6
T6	(United States) Jennifer Kupcho	66-70=136	−6
T6	(United States) Amy Olson	70-66=136	−6

=== Third round ===
Saturday, 27 July 2019

Place	Player	Score	To par
1	(South Korea) Kim Hyo-joo	69-64-65=198	−15
2	(South Korea) Park Sung-hyun	67-66-66=199	−14
T3	(South Korea) Ko Jin-young	65-71-66=202	−11
T3	(South Korea) Inbee Park	65-68-69=202	−11
T5	(China) Shanshan Feng	69-66-68=203	−10
T5	(South Korea) Lee Mi-hyang	65-67-71=203	−10
7	(Sweden) Caroline Hedwall	72-64-68=204	−9
T8	(South Korea) Chella Choi	67-70-68=205	−8
T8	(Thailand) Ariya Jutanugarn	70-71-64=205	−8
T8	(United States) Megan Khang	68-70-67=205	−8
T8	(United States) Jennifer Kupcho	66-70-69=205	−8

=== Final round ===
Sunday, 28 July 2019

Place	Player	Score	To par	Prize money (US$)
1	(South Korea) Ko Jin-young	65-71-66-67=269	−15	615,000
T2	(China) Shanshan Feng	69-66-68-68=271	−13	290,778
T2	(South Korea) Kim Hyo-joo	69-64-65-73=271	−13	290,778
T2	(United States) Jennifer Kupcho	66-70-69-66=271	−13	290,778
5	(Thailand) Ariya Jutanugarn	70-71-64-68=273	−11	172,316
T6	(Thailand) Moriya Jutanugarn	68-72-66-68=274	−10	129,498
T6	(South Korea) Park Sung-hyun	67-66-66-75=274	−10	129,498
T8	(United States) Megan Khang	68-70-67-70=275	−9	98,169
T8	(South Korea) Inbee Park	65-68-69-73=275	−9	98,169
10	(Spain) Carlota Ciganda	70-69-67-70=276	−8	84,591

==== Scorecard ====
Hole	1	2	3	4	5	6	7	8	9	10	11	12	13	14	15	16	17	18
Par	4	3	4	4	3	4	5	3	5	4	4	4	4	3	5	3	4	5
(South Korea) Ko	−11	−11	−11	−11	−11	−12	−13	−13	−13	−14	−14	−13	−14	−14	−14	−14	−15	−15
(China) Feng	−10	−10	−10	−11	−11	−12	−12	−12	−13	−12	−12	−12	−12	−12	−12	−12	−13	−13
(South Korea) Kim	−15	−15	−14	−14	−14	−14	−14	−15	−15	−15	−16	−15	−15	−12	−12	−12	−12	−13
(United States) Kupcho	−8	−8	−9	−9	−9	−9	−9	−10	−10	−10	−10	−10	−10	−10	−11	−11	−12	−13
(Thailand) A. Jutanugarn	−8	−8	−8	−8	−8	−8	−8	−9	−10	−9	−10	−9	−9	−9	−9	−9	−9	−11
(Thailand) M. Jutanugarn	−7	−7	−7	−8	−8	−9	−8	−8	−9	−10	−10	−8	−8	−8	−8	−9	−9	−10
(South Korea) Park S-h	−13	−12	−13	−13	−12	−12	−13	−13	−13	−13	−11	−10	−10	−11	−10	−11	−11	−10

Cumulative tournament scores, relative to par

Eagle	Birdie	Bogey	Double bogey	Triple bogey+
