= 2015 Women's British Open =

Golf tournament

Coordinates: 55.316°N 4.833°W

2015 Ricoh Women's British Open
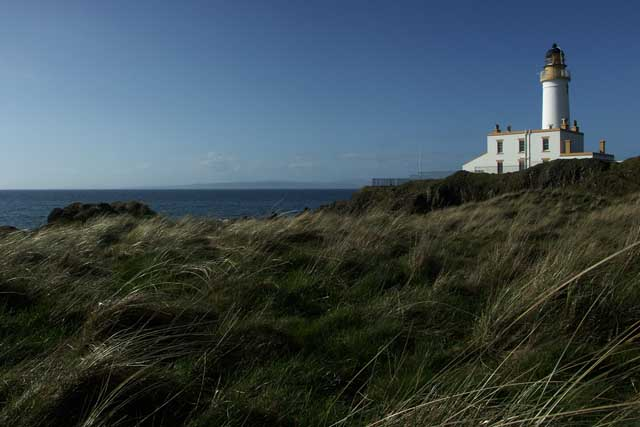
- Turnberry Point Lighthouse

Tournament information
- Dates: 30 July – 2 August 2015
- Location: South Ayrshire, Scotland
- Courses: Trump Turnberry; Ailsa Course
- Organized by: Ladies' Golf Union
- Tours: Ladies European Tour; LPGA Tour

Statistics
- Par: 72
- Length: 6,410 yards (5,861 m)
- Field: 144 players, 73 after cut
- Cut: 149 (+5)
- Prize fund: $3,000,000 €2,651,424 £1,919,429
- Winner's share: $464,817 €410,809 £298,534

Champion
- (South Korea) Inbee Park
- 276 (−12)

Location in Scotland
Location in South Ayrshire, Scotland

The 2015 Ricoh Women's British Open was played 30 July – 2 August at the Trump Turnberry in South Ayrshire, Scotland. It was the 39th Women's British Open, and the 15th as a major championship on the LPGA Tour.

Inbee Park shot a final found 65 (−7) to win her first Women's British Open, three strokes ahead of compatriot Ko Jin-young, the 54-hole co-leader. It was Park's seventh major title and second of the season.

This was the second Women's British Open at Turnberry, which previously hosted 13 years earlier in 2002. As in 2002, it was played at par 72, with two par fours (3, 14) as par fives. ESPN2 and BBC Sport televised the event in the United States and the United Kingdom.

== Course ==
Ailsa Course

Hole	Name	Yards	Par	Hole	Name	Yards	Par
1	Ailsa Craig	350	4	10	Dinna Fouter	407	4
2	Mak Siccar	379	4	11	Maidens	175	3
3	Blaw Wearie	462	5^	12	Monument	382	4
4	Woe-Be-Tide	165	3	13	Tickly Tap	380	4
5	Fin Me Oot	413	4	14	Risk-An-Hope	449	5^
6	Tappie Toorie	195	3	15	Ca' Canny	170	3
7	Roon The Ben	469	5	16	Wee Burn	372	4
8	Goat Fell	395	4	17	Lang Whang	457	5
9	Bruce's Castle	412	4	18	Duel in the Sun	378	4
Out		3,240	36	In		3,170	36
Source:				Total		6,410	72

^ These par-4 holes (3, 14) are played as par-5 during this tournament.

- Women's British Open in 2002: 6,407 yards (5,859 m), par 72
- The Open Championship in 2009: 7,204 yards (6,587 m), par 70

== Field ==
The field is 144 players, and most earn exemptions based on past performance on the Ladies European Tour, the LPGA Tour, previous major championships, or with a high ranking in the Women's World Golf Rankings. The rest of the field earn entry by successfully competing in qualifying tournaments open to any female golfer, professional or amateur, with a low handicap.

There were 17 exemption categories for the 2015 Women's British Open.

1. The top 15 finishers (and ties) from the 2014 Women's British Open.

- Marina Alex, Laura Davies, Shanshan Feng (12), Julieta Granada, Charley Hull (9), Eun-Hee Ji, Jessica Korda, Stacy Lewis (9,11,12), Mo Martin (11), Azahara Muñoz, Gwladys Nocera (8), Anna Nordqvist (8), Inbee Park (8,12), Suzann Pettersen (12), Angela Stanford
- Sun-Ju Ahn (9) did not play

2. The top 10 Ladies European Tour members in the Women's World Golf Rankings as of 30 June not exempt under (1).

- Carlota Ciganda (3), Sandra Gal (3), Caroline Hedwall, Karine Icher, Ariya Jutanugarn (3), Caroline Masson, Catriona Matthew (3,11), Lee-Anne Pace, Beatriz Recari
- Christel Boeljon (8) did not play

3. The top 30 LPGA Tour members in the Women's World Golf Rankings as of 30 June not exempt under (1).

- Baek Kyu-jung, Chella Choi, Choi Na-yeon (8,12), Paula Creamer, Jang Ha-na, Cristie Kerr (8), Kim Hyo-joo (8,9,12), Kim Sei-young (8), Lydia Ko (8), Brittany Lang, Alison Lee, Ilhee Lee, Mi Hyang Lee, Minjee Lee (8), Brittany Lincicome (8,12), Pornanong Phatlum, Gerina Piller, Morgan Pressel, Ryu So-yeon (8,12), Lizette Salas, Jenny Shin, Lexi Thompson (12), Karrie Webb, Michelle Wie (12), Amy Yang (8)
- Mirim Lee did not play

4. The top 25 on the current LET money as of 30 June not exempt under (1) or (2).

- Beth Allen, Lucie Andre, Rebecca Artis, Isabelle Boineau, Amy Boulden, Anne-Lise Caudal, Ssu-Chia Cheng, Holly Clyburn, Nicole Garcia, Felicity Johnson, Stacey Keating, Nicole Broch Larsen, Camilla Lennarth, Xi Yu Lin, Nanna Koerstz Madsen, Florentyna Parker, Emily Kristine Pedersen, Titiya Plucksataporn, Pamela Pretswell, Melissa Reid (8), Marion Ricordeau, Marianne Skarpnord, Kylie Walker, Sally Watson, Ursula Wikström

5. The top 40 on the current LPGA Tour money list as of 30 June not exempt under (1) or (3).

- Jacqui Concolino, Austin Ernst, Mina Harigae, Wei-Ling Hsu, Mi Jung Hur, Juli Inkster, Tiffany Joh, Moriya Jutanugarn, Danielle Kang, Kim Kaufman, Christina Kim, P.K. Kongkraphan, Candie Kung, Min Seo Kwak, Sydnee Michaels, Ai Miyazato, Mika Miyazato, Meena Lee, Pernilla Lindberg, Maria McBride, Haru Nomura, Park Hee-young, Jane Park, Paula Reto, Kelly Shon, Jennifer Song, Kelly Tan, Yani Tseng (11,12), Mariajo Uribe, Alison Walshe, Sakura Yokomine, Sun-Young Yoo (12)

6. The top five on the current LPGA of Japan Tour (JLPGA) money list as of 14 June not exempt under (1), (2), (3), or (13).

- Misuzu Narita, Shiho Oyama, Ritsuko Ryu, Ayaka Watanabe, Yumiko Yoshida

7. The top two on the current LPGA of Korea Tour (KLPGA) money list as of 30 June not exempt under (1), (2), (3), or (6).

- Chun In-gee (12), Ko Jin-young

8. Winners of any recognised LET or LPGA Tour events in the calendar year 2015.

- Su-Hyun Oh

9. Winners of the 2014 LET, LPGA, JLPGA and KLPGA money lists.

10. Players ranked in the top 30 of the Women's World Golf Rankings as of 30 June, not exempt above.

- Lee Jung-min, Teresa Lu (13)

11. Winners of the last 10 editions of the Women's British Open.

- Jeong Jang, Lorena Ochoa, Jiyai Shin, Sherri Steinhauer did not play

12. Winners of the last five editions of the U.S. Women's Open, ANA Inspiration, and Women's PGA Championship, and the Evian Championship winners from 2013 and 2014.

13. Winner of the 2014 Japan LPGA Tour Championship Ricoh Cup.

14. The leading five LPGA Tour members upon completion of 36 holes in the 2015 Marathon Classic who have entered the Championship and who are not otherwise exempt.

- Dewi Claire Schreefel, Sarah Kemp, Alena Sharp, Jenny Suh, Jaye Marie Green
- Chie Arimura, Victoria Elizabeth did not play

15. The leading three LET members in the 2015 Aberdeen Asset Management Ladies Scottish Open, who have entered the Championship and who are not otherwise exempt.

- Hannah Burke, Jade Schaeffer, Klára Spilková

16. The 2015 British Ladies Amateur champion, 2014 U.S. Women's Amateur champion, 2014 International European Ladies Amateur Championship champion, winner or next available player in the 2014 LGU Order of Merit, and the Mark H. McCormack Medal holder provided they are still amateurs at the time of the Championship and a maximum of two other leading amateurs at the discretion of the Ladies' Golf Union.

- Céline Boutier (a), Kristen Gillman (a), Connie Jaffrey (a), Luna Sobrón Galmés (a)
- Annabel Dimmock did not play
- Minjee Lee, Mark H. McCormack Medal winner, turned pro in September 2014 forfeiting this exemption. She later qualified under categories 3 and 8.

17. Any players granted special exemptions from qualifying by the Championship Committee.

- Natalie Gulbis, Brooke Henderson

18. Balance of the 90 LPGA Tour members

- Katie Burnett

Qualifiers: Maria Balikoeva, Minea Blomqvist, Carly Booth, Charlotte Ellis, Georgia Hall, Nina Holleder, Rebecca Hudson, Vikki Laing, Chiara Mertens (a), Ashleigh Simon, Linnea Ström (a), Sophie Walker

Alternates: Stephanie Meadow – replaced Mirim Lee

== Round summaries ==
=== First round ===
Thursday, 30 July 2015

Place	Player	Score	To par
1	(South Korea) Kim Hyo-joo	65	−7
T2	(United States) Cristie Kerr	66	−6
T2	(New Zealand) Lydia Ko	66	−6
T4	(South Korea) Baek Kyu-jung	67	−5
T4	(South Korea) Ryu So-yeon	67	−5
T6	(United States) Katie Burnett	68	−4
T6	(South Korea) Ko Jin-young	68	−4
T6	(Taiwan) Teresa Lu	68	−4
T6	(Japan) Mika Miyazato	68	−4
T6	(Spain) Azahara Muñoz	68	−4
T6	(Japan) Shiho Oyama	68	−4
T6	(England) Florentyna Parker	68	−4
T6	(Norway) Suzann Pettersen	68	−4

=== Second round ===
Friday, 31 July 2015

Place	Player	Score	To par
1	(Norway) Suzann Pettersen	68-69=137	−7
T2	(South Korea) Ko Jin-young	68-71=139	−5
T2	(New Zealand) Lydia Ko	66-73=139	−5
T2	(Taiwan) Teresa Lu	68-71=139	−5
T2	(South Korea) So Yeon Ryu	67-72=139	−5
6	(Japan) Mika Miyazato	68-72=140	−4
T7	(Australia) Minjee Lee	69-72=141	−3
T7	(Sweden) Anna Nordqvist	69-72=141	−3
9	(South Korea) Inbee Park	69-73=142	−2
10	(United States) Cristie Kerr	66-77=143	−1
10	(United States) Christina Kim	71-72=143	−1
10	(South Korea) Kim Hyo-joo	65-78=143	−1
10	(Denmark) Nicole Broch Larsen	69-74=143	−1
10	(England) Melissa Reid	73-70=143	−1

=== Third round ===
Saturday, 1 August 2015

Place	Player	Score	To par
T1	(South Korea) Ko Jin-young	68-71-69=208	−8
T1	(Taiwan) Teresa Lu	68-71-69=208	−8
3	(Norway) Suzann Pettersen	68-69-72=209	−7
4	(Japan) Mika Miyazato	68-72-70=210	−6
T5	(New Zealand) Lydia Ko	66-73-72=211	−5
T5	(Australia) Minjee Lee	69-72-70=211	−5
T5	(South Korea) Inbee Park	69-73-69=211	−5
T8	(England) Melissa Reid	73-70-69=212	−4
T8	(South Korea) So Yeon Ryu	67-72-73=212	−4
T10	(Wales) Amy Boulden	71-74-68=213	−3
T10	(Denmark) Nicole Broch Larsen	69-74-70=213	−3

=== Final round ===
Sunday, 2 August 2015

Place	Player	Score	To par	Money ($)
1	(South Korea) Inbee Park	69-73-69-65=276	−12	464,817
2	(South Korea) Ko Jin-young	68-71-69-71=279	−9	302,589
T3	(New Zealand) Lydia Ko	66-73-72-69=280	−8	194,656
T3	(South Korea) So Yeon Ryu	67-72-73-68=280	−8	194,656
5	(Norway) Suzann Pettersen	68-69-72-72=281	−7	136,675
6	(Taiwan) Teresa Lu	68-71-69-74=282	−6	111,824
T7	(Japan) Mika Miyazato	68-72-70-73=283	−5	87,803
T7	(Sweden) Anna Nordqvist	69-72-73-69=283	−5	87,803
T9	(Wales) Amy Boulden	71-74-68-71=284	−4	67,646
T9	(Australia) Minjee Lee	69-72-70-73=284	−4	67,646
T9	(England) Melissa Reid	73-70-69-72=284	−4	67,646

==== Scorecard ====
Final round

Hole	1	2	3	4	5	6	7	8	9	10	11	12	13	14	15	16	17	18
Par	4	4	5	3	4	3	5	4	4	4	3	4	4	5	3	4	5	4
(South Korea) Park	−5	−6	−7	−6	−5	−5	−6	−7	−8	−9	−9	−9	−9	−11	−11	−12	−12	−12
(South Korea) J. Ko	−8	−8	−8	−8	−8	−8	−10	−11	−11	−12	−12	−12	−11	−11	−11	−9	−9	−9
(New Zealand) L. Ko	−5	−5	−6	−6	−6	−5	−6	−7	−7	−8	−8	−6	−6	−8	−7	−7	−8	−8
(South Korea) Ryu	−4	−4	−4	−4	−3	−2	−3	−4	−4	−5	−5	−5	−5	−6	−6	−6	−7	−8
(Norway) Pettersen	−7	−7	−8	−7	−7	−7	−8	−8	−9	−8	−7	−7	−7	−8	−7	−6	−7	−7
(Taiwan) Lu	−6	−5	−5	−5	−5	−5	−5	−6	−6	−6	−6	−6	−6	−7	−6	−6	−6	−6
(Japan) Miyazato	−7	−7	−7	−6	−6	−6	−7	−7	−7	−7	−6	−6	−6	−8	−7	−7	−6	−5
(Sweden) Nordqvist	−1	−1	−2	−1	−1	−1	−2	−2	−2	−2	−2	−2	−2	−3	−3	−4	−5	−5
(Wales) Boulden	−3	−3	−4	−3	−2	−3	−4	−4	−4	−4	−4	−4	−4	−5	−5	−4	−4	−4
(Australia) Lee	−6	−5	−6	−6	−4	−4	−5	−5	−5	−5	−5	−4	−5	−6	−5	−4	−4	−4
(England) Reid	−4	−4	−4	−4	−5	−5	−5	−5	−5	−5	−4	−3	−2	−3	−3	−3	−4	−4

Cumulative tournament scores, relative to par

Eagle	Birdie	Bogey	Double bogey	Triple bogey+
