= 2018 Evian Championship =

Tournament information
- Dates: 13–16 September 2018
- Location: Évian-les-Bains, France; 46.394°N 6.570°E
- Course: Evian Resort Golf Club
- Tours: Ladies European Tour; LPGA Tour

Statistics
- Par: 71
- Length: 6,523 yards (5,965 m)
- Field: 120 players, 72 after cut
- Cut: 145 (+3)
- Prize fund: $3,850,000
- Winner's share: $577,500

Champion
- (United States) Angela Stanford
- 272 (−12)

Location map
- Location in France Location in Auvergne-Rhône-Alpes

The 2018 Evian Championship was played 13–16 September at the Evian Resort Golf Club in Évian-les-Bains, France. It was the 25th Evian Championship (the first 20 played as the Evian Masters), and the sixth as a major championship on the LPGA Tour. The event was televised by Golf Channel and NBC Sports in the United States and Sky Sports in the United Kingdom.

At the age of 40, Angela Stanford won her first major championship on her 76th appearance in a major. Four players tied for second place, a stroke behind, including Amy Olson who came to the last hole needing a par to win but made a double bogey.

== Field ==
The field for the tournament is set at 120, and most earn exemptions based on past performance on the Ladies European Tour, the LPGA Tour, or with a high ranking in the Women's World Golf Rankings.

There are 15 exemption categories for the 2018 Evian Championship.

1. Evian invitations (four)

Natalie Gulbis, Rachel Heck (a), Alana Uriell (a), Albane Valenzuela (a)

- María Fassi (a) and Dylan Kim (a) declined invitations.

2. Top two from the Jabra Ladies Open

Karolin Lampert, Astrid Vayson de Pradenne (10)

3. Winner of the SGF 67 Evian Asia Challenge (South Korea)

Ryu Hae-ran (a)

4. Top two players from the PHC Classic on the Symetra Tour

Lauren Coughlin

- Dottie Ardina did not play.

5. The top 40 in the Women's World Golf Rankings, as of 14 August 2018

Marina Alex (9), Brittany Altomare (12), Chun In-gee (6,8), Carlota Ciganda, Austin Ernst, Shanshan Feng (9,12), Georgia Hall (8,9,10,11,12), Nasa Hataoka (9), Brooke Henderson (8,9), Charley Hull, Ji Eun-hee (9), Ariya Jutanugarn (8,9,10), Moriya Jutanugarn (9,12), Danielle Kang (8), Cristie Kerr (9,10), Kim Hyo-joo (6,8), Kim Sei-young (9,12), Ko Jin-young (9), Lydia Ko (6,8,9,12), Jessica Korda (9), Nelly Korda, Lee Jeong-eun, Minjee Lee (9,10), Brittany Lincicome (8,9), Pernilla Lindberg (8,9), Anna Nordqvist (6,8,12), Inbee Park (7,8,9), Park Sung-hyun (8,9), Ryu So-yeon (8,9), Lizette Salas, Lexi Thompson (8), Amy Yang

- Choi Hye-jin, In-Kyung Kim (8,12), Stacy Lewis, Teresa Lu, Oh Ji-hyun, Jiyai Shin (10), Ai Suzuki, and Michelle Wie (8,9) did not play.

6. Past Evian Championship winners

- Suzann Pettersen did not play.

7. Active Evian Masters Champions (must have played in 10 LPGA Tour or LET events from 4 September 2017 to 4 September 2018)

Paula Creamer, Laura Davies

- Juli Inkster did not play.

8. Winners of the other women's majors for the last five years Brittany Lang, Mo Martin

9. LPGA Tour winners since the 2017 Evian

Annie Park, Thidapa Suwannapura

10. LET winners since the 2017 Evian

Aditi Ashok, Céline Boutier, Ashleigh Buhai, Camille Chevalier, Caroline Hedwall, Meghan MacLaren, Azahara Muñoz, Kanyalak Preedasuttijit, Angel Yin

- Jenny Haglund (11) did not play.

11. The top five on the LET Order of Merit, as of 4 September

Sarah Kemp, Klára Spilková, Anne Van Dam

12. Top 10 and ties from the 2017 Evian Championship

Katherine Kirk, Lee Mi-hyang, Jennifer Song, Ayako Uehara

13. 2018 U.S. Women's Amateur champion

- Kristen Gillman did not play.

14. 2018 British Ladies Amateur champion

- Leonie Harm did not play.

15. LPGA Tour money list, as of 4 September (if needed to fill the field to 120)

Nicole Broch Larsen, Sandra Changkija, Pei-Yun Chien, Chella Choi, Cydney Clanton, Jacqui Concolino, Daniela Darquea, Brianna Do, Lindy Duncan, Jodi Ewart Shadoff, Sandra Gal, Hannah Green, Jaye Marie Green, Mina Harigae, Céline Herbin, Daniela Holmqvist, Wei-Ling Hsu, M. J. Hur, Caroline Inglis, Tiffany Joh, Haeji Kang, Megan Khang, Christina Kim, Bronte Law, Lee Jeong-eun, Mirim Lee, Yu Liu, Gaby López, Nanna Koerstz Madsen, Brittany Marchand, Caroline Masson, Catriona Matthew, Ally McDonald, Wichanee Meechai, Benyapa Niphatsophon, Su-Hyun Oh, Amy Olson, Ryann O'Toole, Lee-Anne Pace, Park Hee-young, Jane Park, Pornanong Phatlum, Morgan Pressel, Beatriz Recari, Robynn Ree, Madelene Sagström, Sherman Santiwiwatthanaphong, Alena Sharp, Jenny Shin, Sarah Jane Smith, Mariah Stackhouse, Angela Stanford, Emma Talley, Kris Tamulis, Pannarat Thanapolboonyaras, Maria Torres, Mariajo Uribe, Sakura Yokomine

- Laetitia Beck and Yoo Sun-young did not play.

== Course ==
Hole	1	2	3	4	5	6	7	8	9	Out	10	11	12	13	14	15	16	17	18	In	Total
Par	4	3	4	4	3	4	5	3	5	35	4	4	4	5	3	5	3	4	4	36	71
Yards	399	165	355	434	188	378	545	189	515	3,168	417	353	406	499	226	527	155	331	441	3,355	6,523
Metres	365	151	325	397	172	346	498	173	471	2,898	381	323	372	456	207	482	142	303	403	3,069	5,967

== Round summaries ==
=== First round ===
Thursday, 13 September 2018

Carlota Ciganda and Maria Torres shot 6-under-par rounds of 65 to lead by one stroke over Austin Ernst. The defending champion, Anna Nordqvist, shot 71.

Place	Player	Score	To par
T1	(Spain) Carlota Ciganda	65	−6
T1	(Puerto Rico) Maria Torres	65	−6
3	(United States) Austin Ernst	66	−5
T4	(Japan) Nasa Hataoka	67	−4
T4	(Canada) Brooke Henderson	67	−4
T4	(South Korea) Ryu So-yeon	67	−4
T7	(South Korea) Chun In-gee	68	−3
T7	(England) Georgia Hall	68	−3
T7	(South Korea) Ji Eun-hee	68	−3
T7	(Australia) Katherine Kirk	68	−3
T7	(South Korea) Lee Mi-hyang	68	−3
T7	(United States) Mo Martin	68	−3
T7	(Germany) Caroline Masson	68	−3
T7	(United States) Ally McDonald	68	−3
T7	(United States) Ryann O'Toole	68	−3
T7	(South Korea) Inbee Park	68	−3

=== Second round ===
Friday, 14 September 2018

First round co-leader Maria Torres shot a 69 to remain in a first-place tie with Lee Mi-hyang, Mo Martin, and Amy Olson at 134 (−8). The other first round co-leader, Carlota Ciganda, dropped to 5th place at 135. Defending champion Anna Nordqvist was tied for 30th at 141. World number 1 Park Sung-hyun missed the cut by three strokes with a 148.

Place	Player	Score	To par
T1	(South Korea) Lee Mi-hyang	68-66=134	−8
T1	(United States) Mo Martin	68-66=134	−8
T1	(United States) Amy Olson	69-65=134	−8
T1	(Puerto Rico) Maria Torres	65-69=134	−8
5	(Spain) Carlota Ciganda	65-70=135	−7
T6	(United States) Austin Ernst	66-70=136	−6
T6	(England) Georgia Hall	68-68=136	−6
T6	(Canada) Brooke Henderson	67-69=136	−6
T6	(Taiwan) Wei-Ling Hsu	69-67=136	−6
T6	(South Korea) Ryu So-yeon	67-69=136	−6
T6	(South Korea) Jenny Shin	70-66=136	−6
T6	(United States) Angela Stanford	72-64=136	−6

=== Third round ===
Saturday, 15 September 2018

Amy Olson shot a second straight 65 to take a two-stroke lead over Kim Sei-young.

Place	Player	Score	To par
1	(United States) Amy Olson	69-65-65=199	−14
2	(South Korea) Kim Sei-young	69-68-64=201	−12
3	(United States) Mo Martin	68-66-69=203	−10
T4	(England) Georgia Hall	68-68-68=204	−9
T4	(South Korea) Inbee Park	68-69-67=204	−9
T4	(United States) Angela Stanford	72-64-68=204	−9
T7	(United States) Austin Ernst	66-70-69=205	−8
T7	(Taiwan) Wei-Ling Hsu	69-67-69=205	−8
T7	(South Korea) Lee Jeong-eun	72-66-67=205	−8
T7	(United States) Ryann O'Toole	68-74-63=205	−8

=== Final round ===
Sunday, 16 September 2018

Place	Player	Score	To par	Money ($)
1	(United States) Angela Stanford	72-64-68-68=272	−12	577,500
T2	(United States) Austin Ernst	66-70-69-68=273	−11	244,615
T2	(South Korea) Kim Sei-young	69-68-64-72=273	−11	244,615
T2	(United States) Mo Martin	68-66-69-70=273	−11	244,615
T2	(United States) Amy Olson	69-65-65-74=273	−11	244,615
T6	(South Korea) Lee Jeong-eun	72-66-67-69=274	−10	121,293
T6	(United States) Ryann O'Toole	68-74-63-69=274	−10	121,293
T8	(United States) Jessica Korda	69-71-67-68=275	−9	91,949
T8	(South Korea) Inbee Park	68-69-67-71=275	−9	91,949
T10	(Canada) Brooke Henderson	67-69-72-68=276	−8	69,096
T10	(Australia) Katherine Kirk	68-73-66-69=276	−8	69,096
T10	(New Zealand) Lydia Ko	72-70-67-67=276	−8	69,096
T10	(South Korea) Lee Mi-hyang	68-66-73-69=276	−8	69,096
T10	(South Korea) Ryu So-yeon	67-69-72-68=276	−8	69,096

==== Scorecard ====
Final round

Hole	1	2	3	4	5	6	7	8	9	10	11	12	13	14	15	16	17	18
Par	4	3	4	4	3	4	5	3	5	4	4	4	5	3	5	3	4	4
(United States) Stanford	−9	−10	−10	−11	−11	−11	−11	−10	−10	−11	−11	−11	−11	−11	−13	−11	−12	−12
(United States) Ernst	−8	−8	−8	−8	−8	−9	−9	−9	−9	−9	−9	−9	−10	−10	−11	−11	−11	−11
(South Korea) Kim	−12	−12	−13	−13	−13	−13	−13	−13	−13	−11	−11	−10	−11	−10	−11	−11	−11	−11
(United States) Martin	−11	−11	−11	−11	−11	−11	−10	−10	−11	−10	−10	−10	−10	−10	−11	−11	−11	−11
(United States) Olson	−14	−13	−14	−14	−14	−14	−14	−13	−13	−13	−13	−13	−14	−13	−13	−13	−13	−11
(South Korea) J-e Lee	−8	−8	−8	−7	−7	−7	−7	−7	−8	−8	−8	−8	−9	−9	−10	−9	−9	−10
(United States) O'Toole	−9	−9	−9	−10	−10	−10	−10	−10	−10	−10	−10	−9	−9	−9	−10	−10	−10	−10
(South Korea) Park	−10	−10	−10	−10	−10	−10	−10	−10	−10	−10	−10	−10	−11	−10	−9	−9	−9	−9

Cumulative tournament scores, relative to par

Eagle	Birdie	Bogey	Double bogey
