= 2017 Ladies European Tour =

Professional women's golf tour

2017 Ladies European Tour season
- Duration: February 2017 – December 2017
- Number of official events: 16
- Order of Merit: (England) Georgia Hall
- Player of the Year: (England) Georgia Hall
- Rookie of the Year: (France) Camille Chevalier
- Lowest stroke average: (Sweden) Anna Nordqvist

The 2017 Ladies European Tour was a series of golf tournaments for elite female golfers from around the world, which takes place from February through December 2017. The tournaments are sanctioned by the Ladies European Tour (LET).

== Schedule ==
The table below shows the 2017 schedule. The numbers in brackets after the winners' names indicate the career wins on the Ladies European Tour, including that event, and is only shown for members of the tour.

Key

Major championships
Regular events
Team championships

Date	Tournament	Location	Winner (Note: (a) – Amateur)	WWGR points	Purse	Other tours (Note: ALPG − ALPG Tour, CLPGA − China LPGA Tour, JLPGA − LPGA of Japan Tour, KLPGA − LPGA of Korea Tour, LAGT − Ladies Asian Golf Tour, LPGA − LPGA Tour.)	Notes
12 Feb	Oates Victorian Open	Australia	(England) Melissa Reid (6)	16	A$650,000	ALPG	
19 Mar	SGF67 World Ladies Championship	China	(South Korea) Kim Hae-rym (1)	19	₩700,000,000	KLPGA, CLPGA	
16 Apr	Lalla Meryem Cup	Morocco	(Czech Republic) Klára Spilková (1)	12	€450,000		
23 Apr	Estrella Damm Mediterranean Ladies Open	Spain	(England) Florentyna Parker (3)	16	€300,000		New event
9 Jul	Ladies European Thailand Championship	Thailand	(Thailand) Atthaya Thitikul (1, a)	6	€300,000		New event
30 Jul	Aberdeen Asset Management Ladies Scottish Open	Scotland	(South Korea) Lee Mi-hyang (2)	43	$1,500,000	LPGA	
6 Aug	Ricoh Women's British Open	Scotland	(South Korea) In-Kyung Kim (4)	100	$3,250,000	LPGA	
17 Sep	Evian Championship	France	(Sweden) Anna Nordqvist (3)	100	$3,350,000	LPGA	
24 Sep	Andalucia Costa Del Sol Open De España Femenino	Spain	(Spain) Azahara Muñoz (5)	14	€300,000		
8 Oct	Lacoste Ladies Open de France	France	(United States) Cristie Kerr (n/a)	14	€250,000		
4 Nov	Fatima Bint Mubarak Ladies Open	UAE	(India) Aditi Ashok (3)	14	$550,000		
12 Nov	Hero Women's Indian Open	India	(France) Camille Chevalier (1)	10	$400,000	LAGT	
19 Nov	Sanya Ladies Open	China	(France) Céline Boutier (1)	6	€300,000	LAGT, CLPGA	
9 Dec	Omega Dubai Ladies Masters	UAE	(United States) Angel Yin (1)	18.5	$550,000		

=== Unofficial events ===
The following events appear on the schedule, but do not carry official money or Order of Merit ranking points.

Date	Tournament	Host country	Winners	Purse	Other tours	Notes
20 Aug	Solheim Cup	United States	United States	–	LPGA	
3 Dec	The Queens	Japan	LPGA of Japan	€750,000	ALPG, JLPGA, KLPGA	Team match play

== Order of Merit rankings ==
Rank	Player	Country	Earnings (€)
1	Georgia Hall	England	368,935
2	Carlota Ciganda	Spain	160,798
3	Azahara Muñoz	Spain	111,749
4	Klára Spilková	Czech Republic	104,718
5	Anne van Dam	Netherlands	100,843
6	Florentyna Parker	England	94,609
7	Aditi Ashok	India	92,149
8	Melissa Reid	England	91,269
9	Suzann Pettersen	Norway	69,107
10	Camille Chevalier	France	64,003

== Location of tournaments ==
Location of tournaments in Europe.
Major championship
National open
Regular event
Location of tournaments outside Europe.
National open
Regular event
Team event

== See also ==
- 2017 LPGA Tour
- 2017 LET Access Series
