= 2017 Women's British Open =

Coordinates: 56.299°N 2.646°W

2017 Ricoh Women's British Open
Tournament information
- Dates: 3–6 August 2017
- Location: Fife, Scotland
- Course: Kingsbarns Golf Links
- Organized by: The R&A
- Tours: Ladies European Tour; LPGA Tour

Statistics
- Field: 144 players, 77 after cut
- Cut: 143 (−1)
- Prize fund: $3,250,000 €2,775,905 £2,497,889
- Winner's share: $504,821 €431,180 £387,996

Champion
- (South Korea) In-Kyung Kim
- 270 (−18)

Location in Scotland
Location in Fife, Scotland

The 2017 Ricoh Women's British Open was played 3–6 August in Scotland at Kingsbarns Golf Links in Fife. It was the 41st Women's British Open, the 17th as a major championship on the LPGA Tour, and the first at Kingsbarns, southeast of nearby St Andrews.

This was the first WBO organised by The R&A, which merged with the Ladies' Golf Union in late 2016.

The event was televised by Golf Channel and NBC Sports in the United States and Sky Sports in the United Kingdom.

== Field ==
The field was 144 players, and most earned exemptions based on past performance on the Ladies European Tour, the LPGA Tour, previous major championships, or with a high ranking in the Women's World Golf Rankings. The rest of the field earned entry by successfully competing in qualifying tournaments open to any female golfer, professional or amateur, with a low handicap.

There are 19 exemption categories for the 2017 Women's British Open.

1. The top 15 finishers (and ties) from the 2016 Women's British Open.

Beth Allen (9-LET), Bae Hee-kyung, Chun In-gee (13), Jang Ha-na (8), Ariya Jutanugarn (8,9-LPGA,11), Megan Khang, Lee Mi-hyang (8), Mirim Lee (8), Stacy Lewis (11), Mo Martin (11), Catriona Matthew (11), Ryu So-yeon (8,13), Lexi Thompson (8,13), Karrie Webb

- Teresa Lu and Beatriz Recari did not play.

2. The top 10 Ladies European Tour members in the Women's World Golf Rankings not exempt under (1).

Carlota Ciganda (3,5), Jodi Ewart Shadoff (3), Shanshan Feng (3,5,8), Charley Hull (3), Karine Icher (3,5), In-Kyung Kim (3,5,8), Caroline Masson (5), Anna Nordqvist (3,5,8), Su-Hyun Oh (5), Suzann Pettersen (3,5,13)

3. The top 30 LPGA Tour members in the Women's World Golf Rankings not exempt under (1) as of 4 July.

Chella Choi, Austin Ernst, Brooke Henderson (8,13), M. J. Hur, Moriya Jutanugarn, Danielle Kang (8,13), Cristie Kerr (8), Kim Hyo-joo (13), Kim Sei-young (8), Lydia Ko (13), Jessica Korda, Brittany Lang (13), Minjee Lee, Brittany Lincicome (8,13), Haru Nomura, Inbee Park (8,11,12,13), Park Sung-hyun (9-KLPGA, 13), Gerina Piller, Lizette Salas, Jenny Shin, Michelle Wie (13), Amy Yang (8)

4. The top 25 on the current LET money list not exempt under (1) or (2) as of 4 July.

Carly Booth, Hannah Burke, Holly Clyburn, Olivia Cowan, Tonje Daffinrud, Annabel Dimmock, Sandra Gal (5), Jenny Haglund, Georgia Hall, Kylie Henry, Whitney Hillier, Nuria Iturrioz, Felicity Johnson, Karolin Lampert, Camilla Lennarth, Florentyna Parker (8), Emily Kristine Pedersen (5), Pamela Pretswell, Leticia Ras-Anderica, Melissa Reid (8), Marianne Skarpnord, Klára Spilková (8), Noora Tamminen, Anne van Dam, Angel Yin (5)

5. The top 40 on the current LPGA Tour money list not exempt under (1) or (3) as of 4 July.

Marina Alex, Brittany Altomare, Cydney Clanton, Jacqui Concolino, Lindy Duncan, Laura Gonzalez Escallon, Wei-Ling Hsu, Ji Eun-hee, Kim Kaufman, Katherine Kirk (8), Nelly Korda, Candie Kung, Alison Lee, Lee Jeong-eun, Pernilla Lindberg, Gaby López, Azahara Muñoz (5), Ryann O'Toole, Lee-Anne Pace, Jane Park, Pornanong Phatlum, Madelene Sagström (5), Alena Sharp, Kelly Shon, Sarah Jane Smith, Jennifer Song, Angela Stanford, Yoo Sun-young

6. The top five on the current LPGA of Japan Tour (JLPGA) money list not exempt under (1), (2), (3), or (14) as of 4 July.

Kotone Hori, Fumika Kawagishi, Lee Min-young, Yukari Nishiyama, Ai Suzuki

- Ahn Sun-ju, Jeon Mi-jeong, Kim Ha-neul (10,14), Jiyai Shin (10,11), and Momoko Ueda did not play.

7. The top two on the current LPGA of Korea Tour (KLPGA) money list not exempt under (1), (2), (3), or (6) as of 4 July.

- Kim Ji-hyun and Kim Hae-rym (8) did not play.

8. Winners of any recognised LET or LPGA Tour events in the calendar year 2017.

Atthaya Thitikul (a)

9. Winners of the 2016 LET, LPGA, JLPGA and KLPGA money lists.

- Lee Bo-mee (JLPGA) did not play.

10. The top 30 in the Women's World Golf Rankings, not exempt above as of 4 July.

- all already exempt

11. Winners of the last 10 editions of the Women's British Open.

Yani Tseng

- Lorena Ochoa did not play.

12. Winner of the Gold Medal in the 2016 Rio Olympics.

- already exempt

13. Winners of the last five editions of the U.S. Women's Open, ANA Inspiration, and Women's PGA Championship, and the Evian Championship winners from 2013 to 2016.

- all already exempt

14. Winner of the 2016 Japan LPGA Tour Championship Ricoh Cup.

- already exempt

15. The leading five LPGA Tour members in the 2017 Marathon Classic who have entered the Championship and who are not otherwise exempt.

Aditi Ashok, Pei-Yun Chien, Laura Diaz, Thidapa Suwannapura, Prima Thammaraks

16. The leading three LET members in the 2017 Aberdeen Asset Management Ladies Scottish Open, who have entered the Championship and who are not otherwise exempt.

Lina Boqvist, Olafia Kristinsdottir, Becky Morgan

17. The 2017 British Ladies Amateur champion, 2016 U.S. Women's Amateur champion, 2016 European Ladies Amateur Championship champion, winner or next available player in the 2016 LGU Order of Merit, and the Mark H. McCormack Medal holder provided they are still amateurs at the time of the Championship and a maximum of two other leading amateurs at the discretion of the Ladies' Golf Union.

Leona Maguire, Olivia Mehaffey, Seong Eun-jeong

Bronte Law forfeited her exemption for winning the European Ladies Amateur by turning professional.

18. Any players granted special exemptions from qualifying by the Championship Committee.

Ai Miyazato

19. Balance of the 90 LPGA Tour members.

Simin Feng, Jaye Marie Green, Joanna Klatten, Morgan Pressel

Qualifiers:

- Nicole Broch Larsen, Ashleigh Buhai, Paula Creamer, Laura Davies, Isi Gabsa, Nicole Garcia, Lydia Hall, Tiffany Joh, Vikki Laing, Sophie Lamb (a), My Leander (a), Min Lee, Amelia Lewis, Heather Macrae, Ally McDonald, Stacey Peters, Marissa Steen, Ayako Uehara, Sally Watson, Ursula Wikström, Christine Wolf, Jing Yan

== Round summaries ==
=== First round ===
Thursday, 3 August 2017

One of the early starters, Michelle Wie led by a stroke after a course-record round of 64 which included 9 birdies. Play was twice suspended during the afternoon because of lightning in the area.

Place	Player	Score	To par
1	(United States) Michelle Wie	64	−8
2	(South Korea) In-Kyung Kim	65	−7
3	(United States) Lindy Duncan	66	−6
T4	(South Korea) Chella Choi	67	−5
T4	(England) Jodi Ewart Shadoff	67	−5
T4	(England) Melissa Reid	67	−5
T4	(United States) Marissa Steen	67	−5
T4	(United States) Lexi Thompson	67	−5
T4	(Netherlands) Anne van Dam	67	−5
T10	(England) Laura Davies	68	−4
T10	(United States) Jaye Marie Green	68	−4
T10	(England) Georgia Hall	68	−4
T10	(England) Charley Hull	68	−4
T10	(United States) Ally McDonald	68	−4
T10	(Sweden) Anna Nordqvist	68	−4
T10	(United States) Morgan Pressel	68	−4

=== Second round ===
Friday, 4 August 2017

Place	Player	Score	To par
1	(South Korea) In-Kyung Kim	65-68=133	−11
T2	(England) Georgia Hall	68-67=135	−9
T2	(United States) Lexi Thompson	67-68=135	−9
4	(United States) Ally McDonald	68-68=136	−8
T5	(South Korea) Chella Choi	67-70=137	−7
T5	(England) Jodi Ewart Shadoff	67-70=137	−7
T5	(South Korea) Jang Ha-na	69-68=137	−7
T5	(United States) Mo Martin	70-67=137	−7
T9	(China) Shanshan Feng	71-67=138	−6
T9	(Thailand) Moriya Jutanugarn	70-68=138	−6
T9	(United States) Megan Khang	69-69=138	−6
T9	(Sweden) Anna Nordqvist	68-70=138	−6
T9	(Thailand) Thidapa Suwannapura	71-67=138	−6

=== Third round ===
Saturday, 5 August 2017

Place	Player	Score	To par
1	(South Korea) In-Kyung Kim	65-68-66=199	−17
T2	(England) Georgia Hall	68-67-70=205	−11
T2	(Thailand) Moriya Jutanugarn	70-68-67=205	−11
T4	(United States) Ally McDonald	68-68-70=206	−10
T4	(South Korea) Inbee Park	72-70-64=206	−10
6	(United States) Stacy Lewis	70-72-65=207	−9
T7	(England) Jodi Ewart Shadoff	67-70-71=208	−8
T7	(United States) Jaye Marie Green	68-73-67=208	−8
T7	(South Korea) Lee Mi-hyang	70-71-67=208	−8
T7	(Germany) Caroline Masson	69-72-67=208	−8
T7	(England) Melissa Reid	67-72-69=208	−8
T7	(United States) Angel Yin	72-67-69=208	−8

=== Final round ===
Sunday, 6 August 2017

Place	Player	Score	To par	Money (US$)
1	(South Korea) In-Kyung Kim	65-68-66-71=270	−18	504,821
2	(England) Jodi Ewart Shadoff	67-70-71-64=272	−16	302,899
T3	(England) Georgia Hall	68-67-70-70=275	−13	175,509
T3	(Germany) Caroline Masson	69-72-67-67=275	−13	175,509
T3	(United States) Michelle Wie	64-76-69-66=275	−13	175,509
6	(South Korea) Jenny Shin	70-69-70-67=276	−12	111,939
T7	(China) Shanshan Feng	71-67-72-67=277	−11	79,187
T7	(South Korea) Kim Hyo-joo	70-71-68-68=277	−11	79,187
T7	(United States) Stacy Lewis	70-72-65-70=277	−11	79,187
T7	(Sweden) Anna Nordqvist	68-70-72-67=277	−11	79,187

==== Scorecard ====
Final round

Hole	1	2	3	4	5	6	7	8	9	10	11	12	13	14	15	16	17	18
Par	3	5	4	4	4	4	3	5	4	4	5	3	4	3	5	4	4	4
(South Korea) Kim I.K.	−18	−18	−18	−18	−18	−18	−18	−19	−18	−18	−18	−18	−18	−18	−18	−18	−18	−18
(England) Ewart Shadoff	−8	−9	−9	−9	−9	−10	−11	−12	−13	−14	−14	−14	−15	−15	−15	−15	−16	−16
(England) Hall	−11	−11	−11	−11	−11	−11	−11	−12	−11	−11	−12	−13	−13	−13	−13	−13	−13	−13
(Germany) Masson	−8	−9	−9	−9	−9	−9	−10	−11	−11	−11	−12	−12	−12	−11	−12	−12	−12	−13
(United States) Wie	−7	−8	−8	−9	−10	−11	−12	−12	−13	−13	−13	−14	−14	−14	−14	−14	−13	−13
(South Korea) Shin	−7	−8	−8	−8	−9	−8	−8	−9	−9	−9	−9	−9	−10	−10	−11	−11	−11	−12
(China) Feng	−5	−6	−6	−6	−6	−6	−7	−7	−7	−8	−8	−8	−9	−9	−10	−10	−11	−11
(South Korea) Kim H.J.	−7	−8	−8	−8	−9	−10	−10	−11	−11	−10	−10	−10	−11	−11	−12	−11	−11	−11
(United States) Lewis	−9	−11	−10	−11	−11	−11	−11	−12	−10	−10	−11	−11	−11	−11	−11	−11	−11	−11
(Sweden) Nordqvist	−6	−7	−6	−6	−7	−7	−8	−9	−8	−8	−8	−8	−9	−9	−9	−9	−10	−11
(South Korea) Park	−10	−11	−10	−10	−10	−10	−10	−10	−11	−10	−10	−10	−11	−11	−11	−10	−10	−10
(Thailand) Jutanugarn	−11	−11	−11	−11	−11	−11	−11	−11	−11	−11	−11	−11	−11	−9	−9	−10	−8	−8
(United States) McDonald	−10	−11	−10	−10	−10	−10	−10	−11	−11	−11	−10	−10	−10	−9	−9	−9	−8	−8

Cumulative tournament scores, relative to par

Eagle	Birdie	Bogey	Double bogey
