= List of Evian Championship champions =

The Evian Championship is an annual women's golf competition. It became a major in 2013.

== Champions ==
Edition	Year	Country	Champion	Total score	To par^{[b]}	Notes
20th	2013	Norway	Suzann Pettersen	203	−10	
21st	2014	South Korea	Kim Hyo-joo	273	−11	
22nd	2015	New Zealand	Lydia Ko	268	−16	
23rd	2016	South Korea	Chun In-gee	263	−21	
24th	2017	Sweden	Anna Nordqvist	204	−9	
25th	2018	United States	Angela Stanford	272	−12	
26th	2019	South Korea	Ko Jin-young	269	−15	
-	2020	Canceled				
27th	2021	Australia	Minjee Lee	266	−18	
28th	2022	Canada	Brooke Henderson	267	−17	
29th	2023	France	Céline Boutier	270	−14	
30th	2024	Japan	Ayaka Furue	265	−19	
31st	2025	Australia	Grace Kim	270	−14	
32nd	2026	South Korea	Ryu Hae-ran	265	−19	

== See also ==
- Chronological list of LPGA major golf champions
- List of LPGA major championship winning golfers
