= Mediterranean Ladies Open =

Professional golf tournament

Coordinates: 41.226°N 1.781°E

Estrella Damm Ladies Open

Tournament information
- Location: Barcelona, Spain
- Established: 2017
- Course: Club de Golf Terramar
- Par: 72
- Length: 5,426 m (5,934 yd)
- Tour: Ladies European Tour
- Format: Stroke play
- Prize fund: €300,000
- Month played: July

Current champion
- (Spain) Carlota Ciganda

Location in Europe

The Estrella Damm Ladies Open is a professional golf tournament on the Ladies European Tour, first played in 2017.

The tournament is played in Spain at Club de Golf Terramar, southwest of Barcelona. It was the first Ladies European Tour event held in Europe in the 2017 season. The primary sponsor is S.A. Damm, brewers of Estrella Damm beer.

== Winners ==
Year	Winner	Country	Score	Margin of victory	Runner(s)-up	Winner's share (€)
Estrella Damm Ladies Open
2022	Carlota Ciganda	Spain	270 (−18)	2 strokes	(Scotland) Laura Beveridge	45,000
2021	Maja Stark	Sweden	208 (−8)	2 strokes	(Slovenia) Pia Babnik	37,500
2020	Tournament cancelled due to COVID-19 pandemic in Europe					
Estrella Damm Mediterranean Ladies Open
2019	Carlota Ciganda	Spain	276 (−8)	1 stroke	(Germany) Esther Henseleit	45,000
2018	Anne van Dam	Netherlands	258 (−26)	8 strokes	(Sweden) Caroline Hedwall (South Korea) Selin Hyun (a) (Germany) Caroline Masson	45,000
2017	Florentyna Parker	England	269 (−15)	Playoff	(Spain) Carlota Ciganda (Sweden) Anna Nordqvist	45,000
