= 2017 Solheim Cup =

Women's team golf competition

Coordinates: 41.597°N 93.811°W

- Dates: August 18–20, 2017
- Venue: Des Moines Golf and Country Club
- Location: West Des Moines, Iowa
- Captains: Juli Inkster (USA); Annika Sörenstam (Europe)
| (United States) | 16 1/2 | 11 1/2 | (Europe) |
- United States wins the Solheim Cup

Location map
- Location within the United States Location within Iowa

The 2017 Solheim Cup was the 15th edition of the Solheim Cup matches, held August 18–20 at the Des Moines Golf and Country Club in West Des Moines, Iowa. The Solheim Cup is a biennial team competition between the top women professional golfers from Europe and the United States. It is a three-day match play event between teams of twelve players with a similar format to the Ryder Cup. Juli Inkster captained the U.S. team for the second time and Annika Sörenstam captained the European team for the first time.

The United States won by a score of 16 1/2 to 11 1/2, retaining the cup they won in 2015.

== Course layout ==
The Solheim Cup did not use either of the venue's two courses, North and South, in the configurations played by club members. Instead, it used a composite course, made up of nine holes from each of the two courses, that played to 6,894 yards (6,304 m) par 73. The average elevation is approximately 950 feet (290 m) above sea level.

| Hole | Yards | Par | Hole | Yards | Par |
|---|---|---|---|---|---|
| 1 | 306 | 4 | 10 | 386 | 4 |
| 2 | 410 | 4 | 11 | 563 | 5 |
| 3 | 168 | 3 | 12 | 424 | 4 |
| 4 | 561 | 5 | 13 | 446 | 4 |
| 5 | 476 | 5 | 14 | 163 | 3 |
| 6 | 409 | 4 | 15 | 536 | 5 |
| 7 | 331 | 4 | 16 | 385 | 4 |
| 8 | 171 | 3 | 17 | 186 | 3 |
| 9 | 562 | 5 | 18 | 416 | 4 |
| Out | 3,394 | 37 | In | 3,500 | 36 |
| Source: | | Total | | 6,894 | 73 |

== Format ==
The Solheim Cup is a match play event, with each match worth one point. The format is as follows:

- Day 1 (Friday): Four foursome (alternate shot) matches in a morning session and four fourball (better ball) matches in an afternoon session. A total of eight players from each team participate in each session.
- Day 2 (Saturday): Four foursome (alternate shot) matches in a morning session and four fourball (better ball) matches in an afternoon session. A total of eight players from each team participate in each session.
- Day 3 (Sunday): 12 singles matches. All 12 players from each team participate.

With a total of 28 points, 14 1/2 points are required to win the Cup, and 14 points are required for the defending champion to retain the Cup. All matches are played to a maximum of 18 holes. If the score is even after 18 holes, each team earns one-half point.

== Team qualification and selection ==
=== Eligibility criteria ===
The United States and European teams have different eligibility criteria:

Team USA
Members of the United States team must be current members of the LPGA Tour and meet one of these three citizenship criteria:

- U.S. citizens by birth, regardless of their birthplace.
- Those who were naturalized as U.S. citizens before age 18.
- Those who became U.S. citizens by adoption before age 13.

Team Europe
Members of the European team must:

1. be current members of the Ladies European Tour in any category or membership;
2. have played in six Ranking Events during the Qualifying Period as a member of the LET, unless selected as a Captain's pick (provided she is otherwise eligible);
3. must be a "European national". To be a "European national", the player must satisfy the criteria set out in the "Nationality Policy" issued by the International Golf Federation.

=== Team selection ===
The United States and European teams are selected by different methods.

Team USA
Team USA consisted of the leading eight players from the LPGA Solheim Cup points rankings, the top two players in the Women's World Golf Rankings not already qualified via the points rankings and two chosen by the team captain. LPGA Solheim Cup points were earned for top-20 finishes on the LPGA Tour over a two-year period beginning with the 2015 Yokohama Tire LPGA Classic and ending with the 2017 Women's British Open. Points were doubled in major championships and top-20 finishes during the 2017 LPGA Tour season earn more points than those in 2015 and 2016.

Team Europe
Team Europe consisted of the top four players from the LET Solheim Cup standings, followed by the top four LET members on the Women's World Golf Rankings who were not already qualified via the Solheim Cup standings, and four captain's selections.

== Teams ==
Team USA
| Player | Age | Points rank | Rolex ranking | Previous appearances | Matches | W–L–H | Winning percentage |
|---|---|---|---|---|---|---|---|
| Juli Inkster | 57 | Non-playing captain | | | | | |
| Pat Hurst | 48 | Non-playing assistant captain | | | | | |
| Nancy Lopez | 60 | Non-playing assistant captain | | | | | |
| Wendy Ward | 44 | Non-playing assistant captain | | | | | |
| Lexi Thompson | 22 | 1 | 2 | 2 | 7 | 3–2–2 | 57.14 |
| Stacy Lewis | 32 | 2 | 19 | 3 | 12 | 4–7–1 | 37.50 |
| Gerina Piller | 32 | 3 | 24 | 2 | 7 | 3–2–2 | 57.14 |
| Cristie Kerr | 39 | 4 | 14 | 8 | 34 | 15–14–5 | 51.47 |
| Danielle Kang | 24 | 6 | 21 | 0 | Rookie | | |
| Michelle Wie | 27 | 7 | 29 | 4 | 15 | 7–7–1 | 50.00 |
| Brittany Lang | 31 | 8 | 41 | 4 | 14 | 5–6–3 | 46.43 |
| Brittany Lincicome | 31 | 9 | 45 | 5 | 18 | 5–11–2 | 33.33 |
| Lizette Salas | 28 | 12 | 46 | 2 | 6 | 1–3–2 | 33.33 |
| Austin Ernst | 25 | 11 | 57 | 0 | Rookie | | |
| Angel Yin | 18 | 22 | 51 | 0 | Rookie | | |
| Paula Creamer | 31 | 16 | 110 | 6 | 27 | 14–8–5 | 61.11 |

Creamer replaced Jessica Korda, who withdrew with a forearm injury after finishing fifth in points.
Ages on first day of matches, August 18; Rolex rankings at team selection on August 7.
Captain's picks shown in yellow.

Team Europe
| Player | Country | Age | Points rank | Rolex ranking | Previous appearances | Matches | W–L–H | Winning percentage |
|---|---|---|---|---|---|---|---|---|
| Annika Sörenstam | Sweden | 46 | Non-playing captain | | | | | |
| Marta Figueras-Dotti | Spain | 59 | Non-playing assistant captain | | | | | |
| Maria McBride | Sweden | 43 | Non-playing assistant captain | | | | | |
| Suzann Pettersen | Norway | 36 | Non-playing assistant captain^ | | | | | |
| Georgia Hall | England | 21 | 1 | 44 | 0 | Rookie | | |
| Florentyna Parker | England | 28 | 2 | 106 | 0 | Rookie | | |
| Melissa Reid | England | 29 | 3 | 97 | 2 | 8 | 4–3–1 | 56.25 |
| Jodi Ewart Shadoff | England | 29 | 4 | 28 | 1 | 3 | 2–1–0 | 66.67 |
| Carlota Ciganda | Spain | 27 | 5 | 20 | 2 | 7 | 4–1–2 | 71.43 |
| Charley Hull | England | 21 | 6 | 25 | 2 | 8 | 6–2–0 | 75.00 |
| Karine Icher | France | 38 | 23 | 42 | 3 | 10 | 5–4–1 | 55.00 |
| Anna Nordqvist | Sweden | 30 | – | 13 | 4 | 16 | 8–7–1 | 53.13 |
| Caroline Masson | Germany | 28 | 8 | 49 | 2 | 7 | 2–3–2 | 42.86 |
| Emily Kristine Pedersen | Denmark | 21 | 9 | 115 | 0 | Rookie | | |
| Madelene Sagström | Sweden | 24 | 33 | 70 | 0 | Rookie | | |
| Catriona Matthew^ | Scotland | 47 | 28 | 98 | 8 | 33 | 15–10–8 | 57.58 |

^ Matthew, previously named an assistant captain, replaced Suzann Pettersen, who withdrew with a back injury after qualifying for the team by her Rolex ranking.
Ages on first day of matches, August 18; Rolex rankings at team selection on August 7.
Captain's picks shown in yellow.

== Day one ==
Friday, August 18, 2017

=== Morning foursomes ===
In the opening match, Europe was dormie-2 before Cristie Kerr and Lexi Thompson won the last two holes to halve the match. In the last match, the United States was two up after 12 holes until Karine Icher and Catriona Matthew won three of the next four holes and won the match by 1 hole.

| | Results |
|---|---|---|
| Reid/Hull | halved | Kerr/Thompson |
| Ciganda/Masson | (United States) 1 up | Kang/Salas |
| Nordqvist/Hall | (Europe) 3 & 1 | Creamer/Ernst |
| Icher/Matthew | (Europe) 1 up | Lewis/Piller |
| 2 1/2 | Session | 1 1/2 |
| 2 1/2 | Overall | 1 1/2 |

=== Afternoon four-ball ===
The United States won all four matches of the afternoon session. The Europe pairs never led at any stage in any of the matches. This was the first time United States swept a session in Solheim Cup history.

| | Results |
|---|---|---|
| Sagström/Ewart Shadoff | (United States) 3 & 1 | Wie/Kang |
| Ciganda/Pedersen | (United States) 6 & 5 | Yin/Salas |
| Parker/Masson | (United States) 3 & 2 | Lincicome/Lang |
| Hull/Hall | (United States) 2 & 1 | Lewis/Piller |
| 0 | Session | 4 |
| 2 1/2 | Overall | 5 1/2 |

== Day two ==
Saturday, August 19, 2017

=== Morning foursomes ===
After heavy defeats in the first two matches, Europe recovered to level the session by winning the last two matches. The two European pairings who had won their foursomes matches on the first day were also the winning pairs in the second foursomes session. By winning her match, Kerr became the leading United States points scorer, with 19, passing the 18.5 of Juli Inkster.

| | Results |
|---|---|---|
| Ewart Shadoff/Masson | (United States) 5 & 3 | Kerr/Thompson |
| Reid/Pedersen | (United States) 5 & 3 | Creamer/Ernst |
| Nordqvist/Hall | (Europe) 2 & 1 | Lewis/Piller |
| Matthew/Icher | (Europe) 2 & 1 | Wie/Kang |
| 2 | Session | 2 |
| 4 1/2 | Overall | 7 1/2 |

=== Afternoon four-ball ===
The United States won three of the four matches to take a commanding lead, needing just 3 1/2 points in the singles to retain the Solheim Cup. Kerr and Thompson were paired together for the sixth time (3 in 2015 and 3 in 2017), and remained undefeated as a pair, with four wins and two draws. In 16 holes, the two posted a combined score of 12 under par.

| | Results |
|---|---|---|
| Reid/Ciganda | (United States) 2 up | Lang/Lincicome |
| Nordqvist/Ewart Shadoff | (Europe) 4 & 2 | Salas/Yin |
| Icher/Sagström | (United States) 2 & 1 | Creamer/Ernst |
| Matthew/Hall | (United States) 4 & 2 | Kerr/Thompson |
| 1 | Session | 3 |
| 5 1/2 | Overall | 10 1/2 |

== Day three ==
Sunday, August 20, 2017

=== Singles ===
In the opening singles matchup, Anna Nordqvist won the first four holes against Thompson and held a four-hole advantage with nine holes remaining. Thompson rallied to take a late 1-up lead, shooting eight under par over the following seven holes. Her run included eagles at the 11th and 15th holes. On the 18th hole, Nordqvist hit her approach shot within a foot of the hole for a birdie that earned Europe a half-point. In the next two matches, Paula Creamer defeated Georgia Hall by a 1-up margin and Kerr concluded an undefeated week with a 2 and 1 victory over Melissa Reid. Americans Lizette Salas and Angel Yin went dormie in their matches, ensuring that the U.S. would win the 14 points necessary to retain the Solheim Cup. Yin and Karine Icher went on to halve their match, while Salas won against Jodi Ewart Shadoff to clinch an outright victory for the U.S.

| | Results |
|---|---|---|
| Anna Nordqvist | halved | Lexi Thompson |
| Georgia Hall | (United States) 1 up | Paula Creamer |
| Melissa Reid | (United States) 2 & 1 | Cristie Kerr |
| Catriona Matthew | (Europe) 1 up | Stacy Lewis |
| Karine Icher | halved | Angel Yin |
| Caroline Masson | (Europe) 4 & 2 | Michelle Wie |
| Jodi Ewart Shadoff | (United States) 1 up | Lizette Salas |
| Charley Hull | (Europe) 1 up | Brittany Lang |
| Carlota Ciganda | (Europe) 4 & 3 | Brittany Lincicome |
| Florentyna Parker | (United States) 4 & 2 | Gerina Piller |
| Madelene Sagström | (Europe) 3 & 2 | Austin Ernst |
| Emily Kristine Pedersen | (United States) 3 & 1 | Danielle Kang |
| 6 | Session | 6 |
| 11 1/2 | Overall | 16 1/2 |

== Individual player records ==
Each entry refers to the win–loss–half record of the player.

=== United States ===
| Player | Points | Overall | Singles | Foursomes | Fourballs |
|---|---|---|---|---|---|
| Paula Creamer | 3 | 3–1–0 | 1–0–0 | 1–1–0 | 1–0–0 |
| Austin Ernst | 2 | 2–2–0 | 0–1–0 | 1–1–0 | 1–0–0 |
| Danielle Kang | 3 | 3–1–0 | 1–0–0 | 1–1–0 | 1–0–0 |
| Cristie Kerr | 3.5 | 3–0–1 | 1–0–0 | 1–0–1 | 1–0–0 |
| Brittany Lang | 2 | 2–1–0 | 0–1–0 | 0–0–0 | 2–0–0 |
| Stacy Lewis | 1 | 1–3–0 | 0–1–0 | 0–2–0 | 1–0–0 |
| Brittany Lincicome | 2 | 2–1–0 | 0–1–0 | 0–0–0 | 2–0–0 |
| Gerina Piller | 2 | 2–2–0 | 1–0–0 | 0–2–0 | 1–0–0 |
| Lizette Salas | 3 | 3–1–0 | 1–0–0 | 1–0–0 | 1–1–0 |
| Lexi Thompson | 3 | 2–0–2 | 0–0–1 | 1–0–1 | 1–0–0 |
| Michelle Wie | 1 | 1–2–0 | 0–1–0 | 0–1–0 | 1–0–0 |
| Angel Yin | 1.5 | 1–1–1 | 0–0–1 | 0–0–0 | 1–1–0 |

=== Europe ===
| Player | Points | Overall | Singles | Foursomes | Fourballs |
|---|---|---|---|---|---|
| Carlota Ciganda | 1 | 1–3–0 | 1–0–0 | 0–1–0 | 0–2–0 |
| Jodi Ewart Shadoff | 1 | 1–3–0 | 0–1–0 | 0–1–0 | 1–1–0 |
| Georgia Hall | 2 | 2–3–0 | 0–1–0 | 2–0–0 | 0–2–0 |
| Charley Hull | 1.5 | 1–1–1 | 1–0–0 | 0–0–1 | 0–1–0 |
| Karine Icher | 2.5 | 2–1–1 | 0–0–1 | 2–0–0 | 0–1–0 |
| Caroline Masson | 1 | 1–3–0 | 1–0–0 | 0–2–0 | 0–1–0 |
| Catriona Matthew | 3 | 3–1–0 | 1–0–0 | 2–0–0 | 0–1–0 |
| Anna Nordqvist | 3.5 | 3–0–1 | 0–0–1 | 2–0–0 | 1–0–0 |
| Florentyna Parker | 0 | 0–2–0 | 0–1–0 | 0–0–0 | 0–1–0 |
| Emily Kristine Pedersen | 0 | 0–3–0 | 0–1–0 | 0–1–0 | 0–1–0 |
| Melissa Reid | 0.5 | 0–3–1 | 0–1–0 | 0–1–1 | 0–1–0 |
| Madelene Sagström | 1 | 1–2–0 | 1–0–0 | 0–0–0 | 0–2–0 |
