= Mel Reid =

English professional golfer (born 1987)

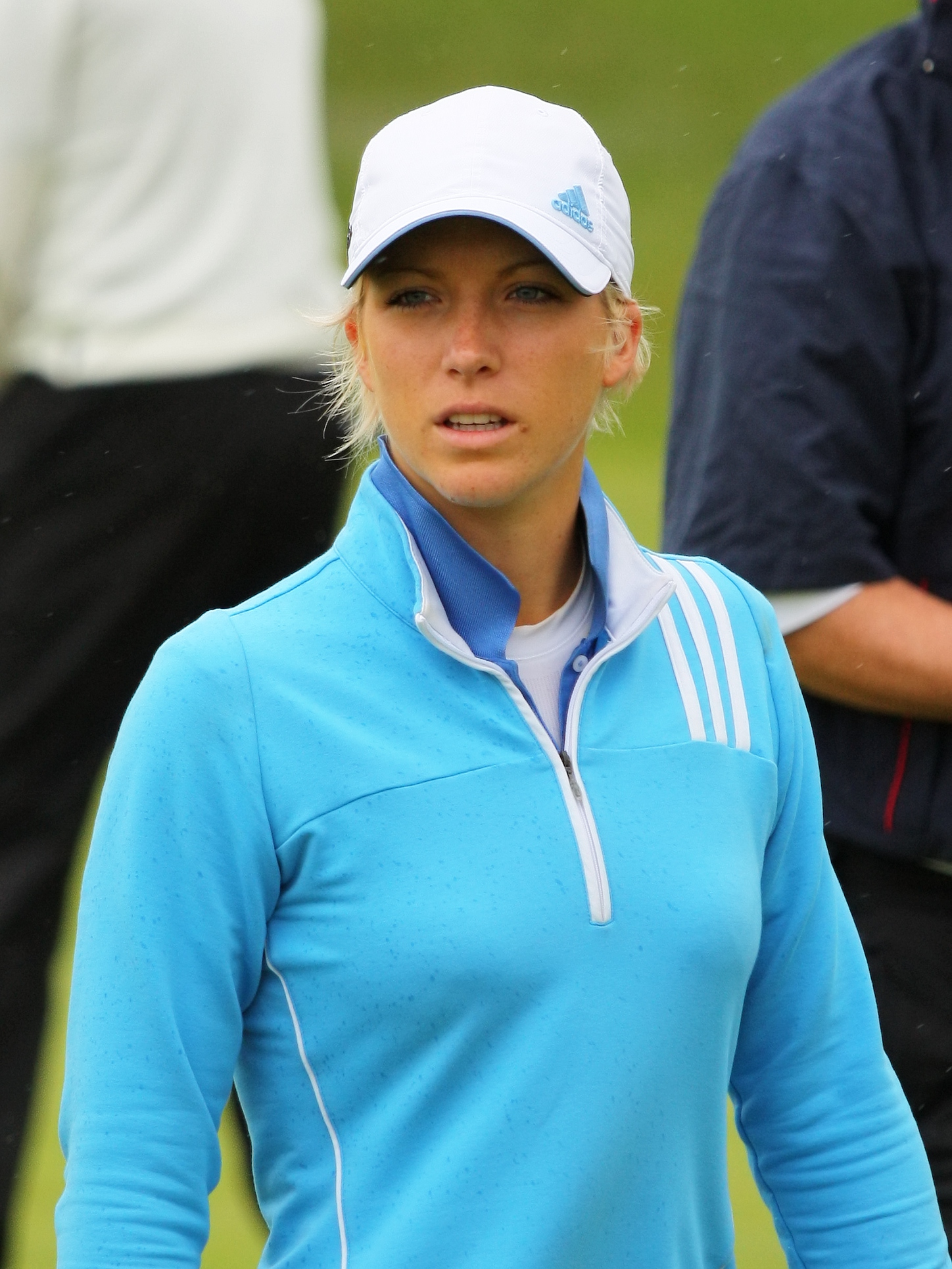
- Reid at the 2010 Women's British Open

Personal information
- Full name: Melissa Rose Reid
- Nationality: England
- Born: 19 September 1987 (age 39) Derby, England
- Height: 1.70 m (5 ft 7 in)

Career
- Sport: Golf
- Turned professional: 2007
- Former tours: Ladies European Tour (joined 2008); LPGA Tour
- Professional wins: 7

Number of wins by tour
- LPGA Tour: 1
- Ladies European Tour: 6

Best results in LPGA major championships
- Chevron Championship: T7: 2020
- Women's PGA C'ship: T3: 2019
- U.S. Women's Open: T46: 2021
- Women's British Open: T9: 2015
- Evian Championship: T37: 2019

Achievements and awards
- Ladies European Tour Rookie of the Year: 2008

Melissa Rose Reid (born 19 September 1987) is an English professional golfer who plays on the Ladies European Tour and the LPGA Tour. In October 2020, she won her maiden LPGA Tour event, the ShopRite LPGA Classic.

== Early life and amateur career ==
In 1987, Reid was born in Derby, England. As an amateur she won several events including the 2004 and 2005 English Girls' Championship, the 2006 and 2007 Helen Holm Trophy, the 2007 St Rule Trophy, and the 2007 Ladies' British Open Amateur Stroke Play Championship. She played on the Great Britain and Ireland team in the 2006 Curtis Cup.

Reid was the low amateur at the 2007 Women's British Open with a T16 finish.

== Professional career ==
In 2007, Reid failed to earn her card at the LET Qualifying School in Italy. However, she turned professional in late 2007 and began playing on the Ladies European Tour in 2008 on sponsor invitations. A third-place finish at the Australian Open in early February allowed her to stay in the top 20 on the money list and gain entrance into LET events for the rest of the season. She placed 12th on the money list in 2008 and was named LET Rookie of the Year.

In 2010, Reid's first LET victory came at the Turkish Airlines Ladies Open. She followed that up with two wins in 2011 and was a member of the 2011 Solheim Cup team, securing a spot on the European team as the leader in the LET rankings.

Reid retired following the 2024 season.

== Personal life ==
In May 2012 Reid's mother, Joy, was killed in an automobile crash near Munich while travelling to see her daughter compete in a Ladies European Tour event. Reid quickly returned to golf but her performance declined rapidly in the ensuing years. In September 2015, Reid told ESPN that her life "was a mess ... I wasn't coping, I was rebelling. I was spending time with people who partied. I was hitting the self-destruct button. I was with a lot of people, but I was lonely."

On 10 December 2018, Reid came out as gay in an interview with Athlete Ally.

== Professional wins (7) ==
=== LPGA Tour wins (1) ===
No.	Date	Tournament	Winning score	To par	Margin of victory	Runner-up
1	4 Oct 2020	ShopRite LPGA Classic	68-64-66-67=265	−19	2 strokes	(United States) Jennifer Kupcho

=== Ladies European Tour (6) ===
No.	Date	Tournament	Winning score	To par	Margin of victory	Runner(s)-up	Winner's share (€)
1	9 May 2010	Turkish Airlines Ladies Open	71-71-74=216	–3	2 strokes	(Netherlands) Christel Boeljon (Denmark) Iben Tinning	30,000
2	5 Jun 2011	Deloitte Ladies Open	71-72-70=213	–3	2 strokes	(France) Caroline Afonso (Sweden) Caroline Hedwall	37,500
3	18 Sep 2011	Open De España Femenino	71-69-70-70=280	–8	1 stroke	(United States) Beth Allen (Spain) Tania Elósegui (South Africa) Lee-Anne Pace	52,500
4	24 Jun 2012	Raiffeisenbank Prague Golf Masters	68-67-72=207	–9	1 stroke	(Italy) Diana Luna	37,500
5	20 May 2015	Turkish Airlines Ladies Open	65-69-74-73=281	–11	4 strokes	(France) Gwladys Nocera	75,000
6	12 Feb 2017	Oates Victorian Open	67-70-67-72=276	–16	Playoff	(Germany) Sandra Gal	53,594

== Results in LPGA majors ==
Results not in chronological order.

Tournament	2007	2008	2009	2010	2011	2012	2013	2014	2015	2016	2017	2018	2019	2020
Chevron Championship				T34	T33	T56				CUT	T68	CUT		T7
Women's PGA Championship							T64			CUT	CUT	T60	T3	T30
U.S. Women's Open					CUT	T50				CUT		CUT		CUT
The Evian Championship ^							CUT		CUT		T68		T37	NT
Women's British Open	T16LA	CUT	CUT	T31	T37	CUT			T9	T65	T30	CUT	CUT	T39

Tournament	2021	2022	2023
Chevron Championship	T14	T44	CUT
Women's PGA Championship	CUT	T30	T24
U.S. Women's Open	T46	CUT	
The Evian Championship		CUT	CUT
Women's British Open	CUT	T37	CUT

^ The Evian Championship was added as a major in 2013.

Top 10
Did not play

LA = low amateur
CUT = missed the half-way cut
NT = no tournament
"T" = tied

=== Summary ===
Tournament	Wins	2nd	3rd	Top-5	Top-10	Top-25	Events	Cuts made
Chevron Championship	0	0	0	0	1	2	10	7
Women's PGA Championship	0	0	1	1	1	2	9	6
U.S. Women's Open	0	0	0	0	0	0	7	2
The Evian Championship	0	0	0	0	0	0	6	2
Women's British Open	0	0	0	0	1	2	15	8
Totals	0	0	1	1	3	6	47	25

- Most consecutive cuts made – 3 (three times)
- Longest streak of top-10s – 1 (three times)

== World ranking ==
Position in Women's World Golf Rankings at the end of each calendar year.

Year	World ranking	Source
2006	658	
2007	307	
2008	169	
2009	128	
2010	58	
2011	47	
2012	68	
2013	222	
2014	233	
2015	83	
2016	152	
2017	116	
2018	257	
2019	102	
2020	39	
2021	63	
2022	220	
2023	182	
2024	419	
2025	1555	

== Ladies European Tour career summary ==
Year	Tournaments played	Cuts made	Wins	2nd	3rd	Top 10s	Best finish	Earnings (€)	Order of Merit list rank	Scoring average	Scoring rank
2006	1	1	0	0	0	0	T12	n/a	n/a	72.33	n/a
2007	3	3	0	0	0	1	9	4,050^{1}	n/a	73.18	n/a
2008	16	12	0	3	1	7	2	136,606	12	71.96	26
2009	14	13	0	1	2	8	2	168,749	7	71.12	6
2010	21	20	1	2	1	10	1	270,871	3	71.21	7
2011	19	19	2	1	3	10	1	286,578	2	70.83	11
2012	10	8	1	0	0	3	1	82,752	19	72.39	42
2013	13	6	0	0	0	2	T7	28,317	65	73.09	75
2014	14	9	0	1	0	2	2	58,998	32	73.71	85
2015	14	11	1	1	1	6	1	249,151	2	71.86	26
2016	9	7	0	0	1	3	T3	68,847	20	71.46	16
2017	6	4	1	0	0	2	1	91,269	8	70,53	8
2018	4	2	0	0	0	0	T21	22,790	52	72.46	46
2019	3	1	0	0	0	0	T37	23,557	103	72.50^{2}	n/a^{2}
2020	2	1	0	0	0	0	T39	18,524	T118	73.25^{2}	n/a^{2}
2021	3	1	0	0	0	0	T34	8,330	140	72.33^{2}	n/a^{2}

- official as end of 2021 season

^{1} Reid played in only one LET event as a professional in 2007, the Dubai Ladies Masters, in which she finished T35.

^{2} Insufficient number of rounds played to be officially ranked.

== Team appearances ==
Amateur

- European Girls' Team Championship (representing England): 2005 (winners)
- Junior Solheim Cup (representing Europe): 2005
- Curtis Cup (representing Great Britain & Ireland): 2006
- Espirito Santo Trophy (representing England): 2006
- Vagliano Trophy (representing Great Britain & Ireland): 2007
- European Ladies' Team Championship (representing England): 2007
- Commonwealth Trophy (representing Great Britain): 2007 (winners)

Professional

- Solheim Cup (representing Europe): 2011 (winners), 2015, 2017, 2021 (winners)
- The Queens (representing Europe): 2015, 2017
- International Crown (representing England): 2016

=== Solheim Cup record ===
Year	Total matches	Total W–L–H	Singles W–L–H	Foursomes W–L–H	Fourballs W–L–H	Points won	Points %
Career	16	6–7–3	1–3–0	4–2–1	1–2–2	7.5	46.9
2011	4	1–3–0	0–1–0 lost to V. Hurst 2 dn	0–1–0 lost w/ K. Stupples 1 dn	1–1–0 lost w/ L. Davies 1 dn won w/ L. Davies 4&3	1	25.0
2015	4	3–0–1	1–0–0 def. B. Lang 2&1	2–0–0 won w/ C. Hull 2&1 won w/ C. Ciganda 4&3	0–0–1 halved w/ C. Ciganda	3.5	87.5
2017	4	0–3–1	0–1–0 lost to C. Kerr 2&1	0–1–1 halved w/ C. Hull lost w/ E. Pedersen 5&3	0–1–0 lost w/ C. Ciganda 2 dn	0.5	12.5
2021	4	2–1–1	0–1–0 lost to Y. Noh 1 dn	2–0–0 won w/ L. Maguire 1 up won w/ L. Maguire 5&4	0–0–1 halved w/ L. Maguire	2.5	62.5
