= Florentyna Parker =

German-born English golfer

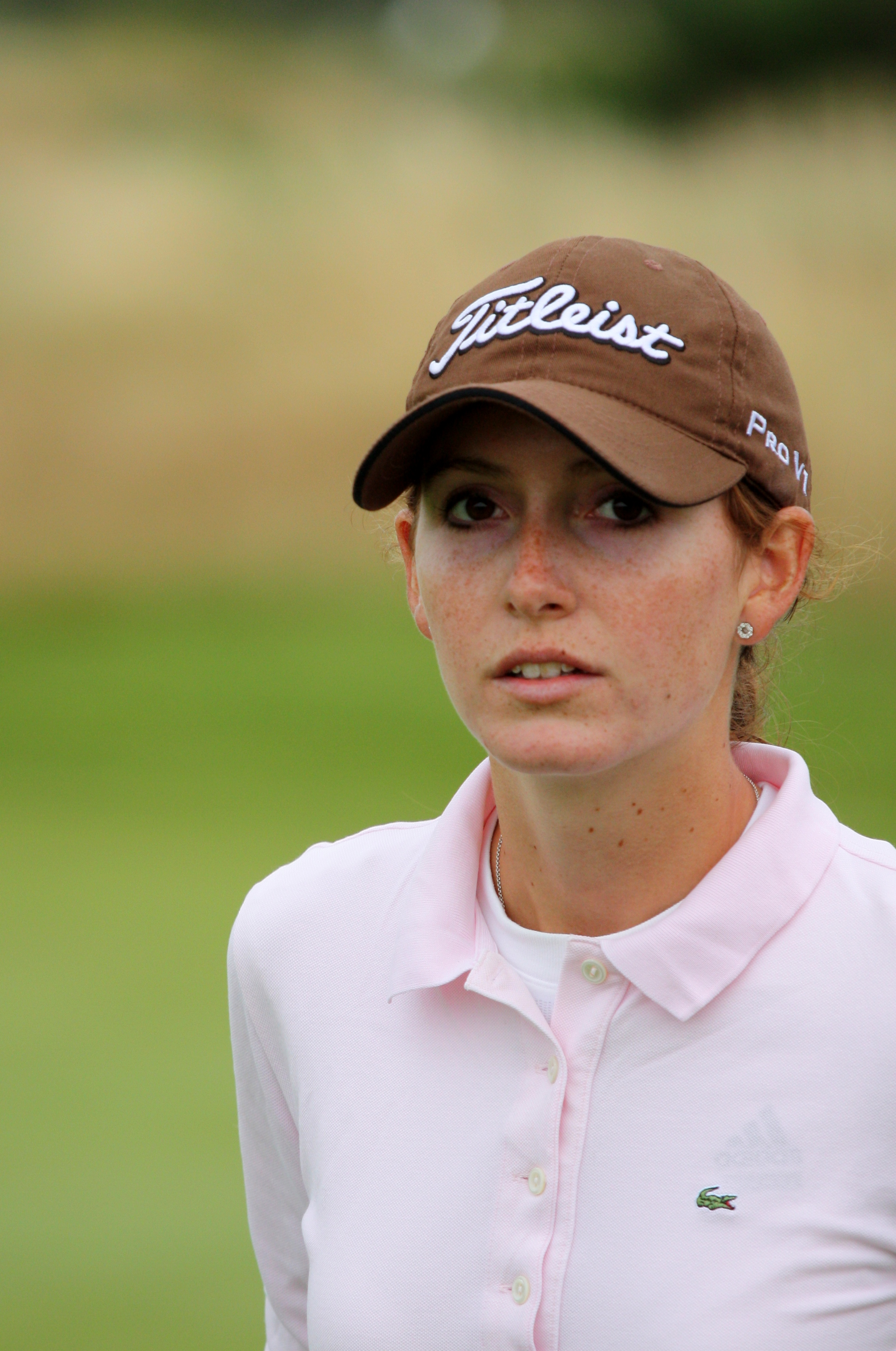
- Parker at the 2009 Women's British Open

Personal information
- Nationality: England
- Born: 20 June 1989 (age 37) Henstedt-Ulzburg, Germany
- Height: 5 ft 8 in (1.73 m)

Career
- Sport: Golf
- Turned professional: 2009
- Current tours: Ladies European Tour; LPGA Tour
- Professional wins: 3

Number of wins by tour
- Ladies European Tour: 3

Best results in LPGA major championships
- Chevron Championship: 75th: 2018
- Women's PGA C'ship: CUT: 2018
- U.S. Women's Open: CUT: 2017
- Women's British Open: T44: 2015
- Evian Championship: T65: 2014

Florentyna Parker (born 20 June 1989) is an English professional golfer born in Germany.

== Amateur career ==
In 2006, Parker was in the training squad for the 2006 Curtis Cup. She competed in the 2008 Curtis Cup where she won her singles match.

== Professional career ==
In 2010, Parker won the ABN AMRO Ladies Open on the Ladies European Tour by two strokes. This win qualified her for the 2010 Women's British Open played at her home course Royal Birkdale Golf Club. This was her first tour win.

In 2014, Parker won the Ladies Italian Open by one stroke. Similar to her 2010 victory, this qualified her for the Women's British Open at her home club.

In 2017, she won the Estrella Damm Mediterranean Ladies Open by overcoming a four-shot deficit. This victory came in a playoff.

== Professional wins (3) ==
=== Ladies European Tour (3) ===
No.	Date	Tournament	Winning score	To par	Margin of victory	Runner(s)-up	Winner's share (€)
1	6 Jun 2010	ABN AMRO Ladies Open	71-66-70=207	−9	2 strokes	(Scotland) Krystle Caithness	37,500
2	29 Jun 2014	Ladies Italian Open	69-72-68=209	−7	1 stroke	(England) Holly Clyburn	37,500
3	23 Apr 2017	Estrella Damm Mediterranean Ladies Open	67-70-66-66=269	−15	Playoff	(Spain) Carlota Ciganda, (Sweden) Anna Nordqvist	45,000

== Team appearances ==
Amateur

- European Lady Junior's Team Championship (representing England): 2006
- Junior Ryder Cup (representing Europe): 2004 (winners)
- Junior Solheim Cup (representing Europe): 2005, 2007 (winners)
- European Ladies' Team Championship (representing England): 2007, 2008
- Curtis Cup (representing Great Britain and Ireland): 2008

Professional

- Solheim Cup (representing Europe): 2017
- The Queens (representing Europe): 2017

=== Solheim Cup record ===
Year	Total matches	Total W–L–H	Singles W–L–H	Foursomes W–L–H	Fourballs W–L–H	Points won	Points %
Career	2	0–2–0	0–1–0	0–0–0	0–1–0	0	0.0
2017	2	0–2–0	0–1–0 lost to G. Piller 4&2		0–1–0 lost w/ C. Masson 3&2	0	0.0
