= Angel Yin =

American professional golfer (born 1998)

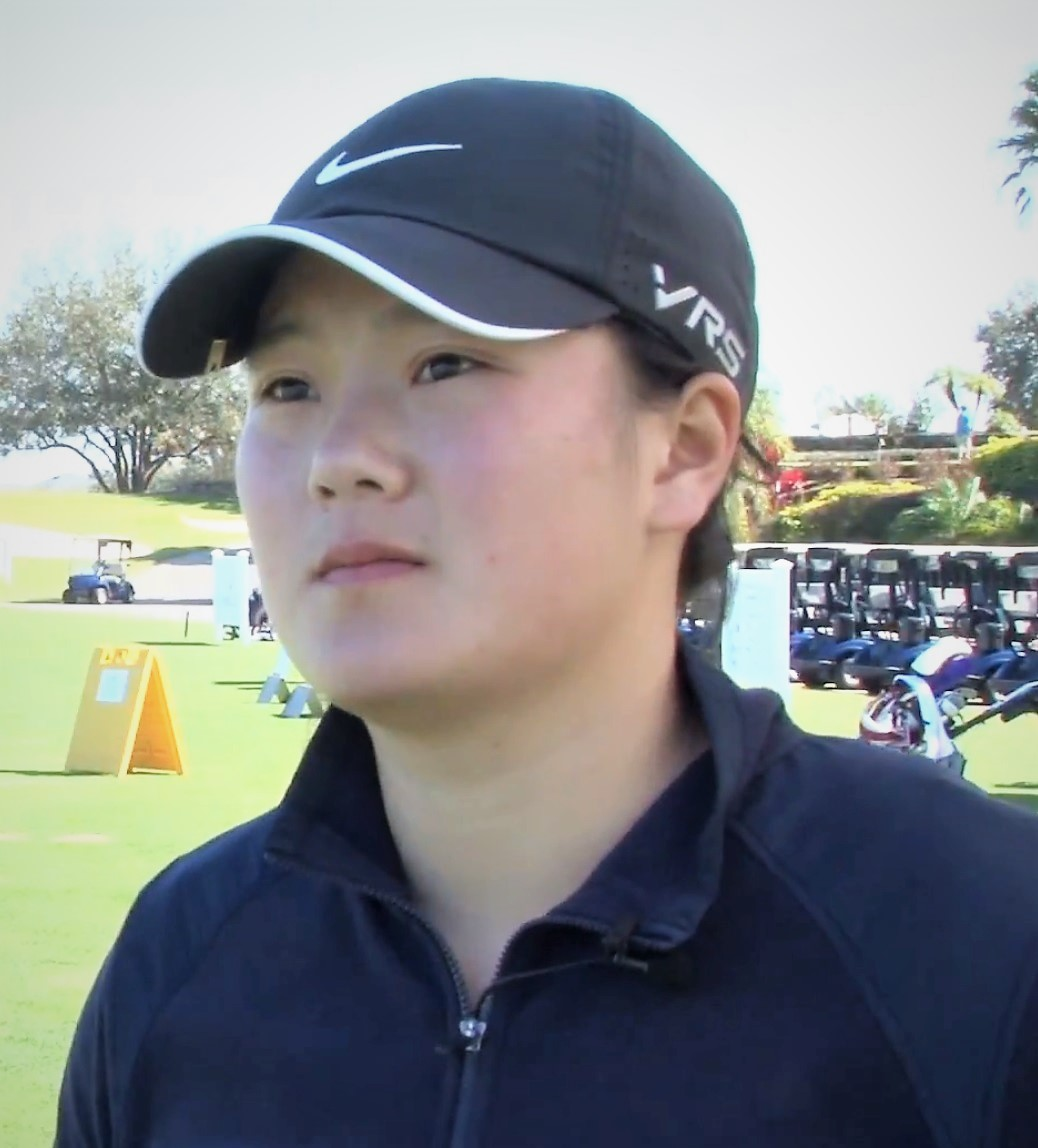
- Yin in 2015

Personal information
- Nationality: United States
- Born: October 3, 1998 (age 28) Los Angeles, California, U.S.
- Height: 5 ft 9 in (175 cm)

Career
- Sport: Golf
- Turned professional: 2016
- Current tours: LPGA Tour; Ladies European Tour
- Professional wins: 3

Number of wins by tour
- LPGA Tour: 2
- Ladies European Tour: 1

Best results in LPGA major championships
- Chevron Championship: 2nd: 2023
- Women's PGA C'ship: T4: 2018
- U.S. Women's Open: T2: 2019
- Women's British Open: T6: 2023
- Evian Championship: T5: 2025

Angel Yin (born October 3, 1998) is an American professional golfer currently playing on the LPGA Tour.

== Amateur career ==
Yin won the 7–8 year old Junior World Golf Championships, won the California Women's Amateur Championship as a 12 year old and again as a 14 year old, was the youngest player at the 2011 U.S. Women's Amateur, was co-medalist at a U.S. Women's Amateur, and was the youngest player in the field at the 2012 U.S. Women's Open (also the second youngest in history).

In 2015, she competed in the Junior Solheim Cup.

== Professional ==
Yin posted five top-5 finishes in 2017. Her "powerful swing and ebullient personality" brought her attention from Juli Inkster, U.S. Solheim Cup captain, who named Yin as a captain's pick for the 2017 Solheim Cup. She became the youngest player on either team. She scored 1.5 points out of 3 matches. On December 9, 2017, she won the Omega Dubai Ladies Classic for her first professional victory. Yin started off the 2019 season tying for fourth in the ISPS Handa Women's Australian Open on February 27, 2019.

At the 2023 Buick LPGA Shanghai in her 159th start, Yin finally broke through for her first win on the LPGA Tour defeating Lilia Vu in a playoff, with Yin birdieing the first extra hole. Earlier in the year, Vu defeated Yin on the first playoff hole at the Chevron Championship. In 2025, she won Honda LPGA Thailand victory for the second LPGA title.

== Personal life ==
Yin was born and raised in Los Angeles, California. Her mother, Michelle Liu, a businesswoman who immigrated to the U.S. from China, caddied for Yin when she was still an amateur. Yin attended Arcadia High School, but finished her diploma online.

== Professional wins (3) ==
=== LPGA Tour wins (2) ===
Legend
Major championships (0)
Other LPGA Tour (2)

No.	Date	Tournament	Winning score	To par	Margin of victory	Runner-up	Winner's share ($)
1	Oct 15, 2023	Buick LPGA Shanghai	70-69-65-70=274	−14	Playoff	(United States) Lilia Vu	315,000
2	Feb 23, 2025	Honda LPGA Thailand	67-64-64-65=260	−28	1 stroke	(Japan) Akie Iwai	255,000

== Playoff record ==
LPGA Tour playoff record (1–1)

No.	Year	Tournament	Opponent	Result
1	2023	Chevron Championship	(United States) Lilia Vu	Lost to birdie on first extra hole
1	2023	Buick LPGA Shanghai	(United States) Lilia Vu	Won with birdie on first extra hole

=== Ladies European Tour wins (1) ===
- 2017 Omega Dubai Ladies Classic

== Results in LPGA majors ==
Results not in chronological order.

Tournament	2012	2013	2014	2015	2016	2017	2018	2019	2020	2021	2022	2023	2024	2025	2026
Chevron Championship		T55	73			T21	74	T39	T59	T57	CUT	2	WD	13	T10
U.S. Women's Open	CUT				CUT	CUT	CUT	T2	CUT	6	T51	T20	CUT	T9	CUT
Women's PGA Championship						T36	T4	T21	T44	CUT	T25	T30	72	T6	WD
The Evian Championship ^						CUT	T69	CUT	NT	T48	WD	T20	CUT	T5	
Women's British Open					CUT	T11	CUT	T35	T59	T34	CUT	T6	T10	T40	

^ The Evian Championship was added as a major in 2013.

Top 10
Did not play

CUT = missed the half-way cut
WD = withdrew
NT = no tournament
"T" = tied

=== Summary ===
Tournament	Wins	2nd	3rd	Top-5	Top-10	Top-25	Events	Cuts made
Chevron Championship	0	1	0	1	2	4	12	10
U.S. Women's Open	0	1	0	1	3	4	12	5
Women's PGA Championship	0	0	0	1	2	4	10	9
The Evian Championship	0	0	0	1	1	2	8	4
Women's British Open	0	0	0	0	2	3	10	7
Totals	0	2	0	4	10	17	52	35

- Most consecutive cuts made – 7 (2024 Women's Open – 2026 Chevron)
- Longest streak of top-10s – 3 (2025 U.S Women's Open – 2025 Evian)

== LPGA Tour career summary ==
Year	Tournaments played	Cuts made*	Wins	2nd	3rd	Top 10s	Best finish	Earnings ($)	Money list rank	Scoring average	Scoring rank
2017	25	20	0	0	0	5	T5	455,235	44	70.75	31
2018	27	21	0	1	1	4	2	667,423	30	71.87	72
2019	24	19	0	1	0	3	T2	755,784	28	71.16	43
2020	12	10	0	0	0	0	T17	106,122	84	71.90	62
2021	22	14	0	0	1	5	T3	494,539	42	72.18	105
2022	25	16	0	0	1	1	T3	384,589	65	71.86	96
2023	17	16	1	1	0	6	1	1,660,716	11	71.08	48
2024	20	13	0	2	0	7	2	1,656,158	15	70.92	28
2025	19	17	1	0	1	6	1	1,778,766	11	70.78	40
Totals^	201	146	2	5	4	37	1	7,959,332	45		

Official as of 2025 season
*Includes matchplay and other tournaments without a cut.

== World ranking ==
Position in Women's World Golf Rankings at the end of each calendar year.

Year	Ranking	Source
2013	595	
2014	704	
2015	n/a	
2016	245	
2017	46	
2018	39	
2019	42	
2020	77	
2021	95	
2022	138	
2023	22	
2024	19	
2025	12	

== U.S. national team appearances ==
Amateur

- Junior Solheim Cup: 2015 (winners)

Professional

- Solheim Cup: 2017 (winners), 2019, 2023, 2026
- International Crown: 2025

=== Solheim Cup record ===
Year	Total matches	Total W–L–H	Singles W–L–H	Foursomes W–L–H	Fourballs W–L–H	Points won	Points %
Career	11	5–4–2	2–1–1	0–0–0	3–3–1	6.0	54.5
2017	3	1–1–1	0–0–1 halved w/ K. Icher		1–1–0 won w/ L. Salas 6&5 lost w/ L. Salas 4&2	1.5	50.0
2019	3	2–1–0	1–0–0 def. A. Muñoz 2&1		1–1–0 won w/ A. McDonald 7&5 lost w/ A. McDonald 2 dn	2	66.7
2023	3	2–1–0	1–0–0 def. C. Boutier 2&1		1–1–0 won w/ C. Knight 2 up lost w/ A. Ewing 4&2	2	66.7
2026	2	0–1–1	0–1–0 lost to L. Grant 4&3		0–0–1 halved w/ Y. Noh	0.5	25.0
