= Jodi Ewart Shadoff =

English professional golfer (born 1988)

Personal information
- Nationality: England
- Born: 7 January 1988 (age 38) Northallerton, England
- Height: 5 ft 5 in (1.65 m)
- Spouse: Adam Shadoff

Career
- Sport: Golf
- College: University of New Mexico (graduated 2010)
- Turned professional: 2010
- Current tours: LPGA Tour (joined 2011); Ladies European Tour (joined 2012)
- Former tour: Symetra Tour (joined 2010)
- Professional wins: 1

Number of wins by tour
- LPGA Tour: 1

Best results in LPGA major championships
- Chevron Championship: T7: 2013
- Women's PGA C'ship: T15: 2023
- U.S. Women's Open: T4: 2013
- Women's British Open: 2nd: 2017
- Evian Championship: T12: 2016

Jodi Ewart Shadoff (born 7 January 1988) is an English professional golfer. She plays on the LPGA Tour and on the Ladies European Tour.

== Early life and amateur career ==
In 1988, Ewart was born at Northallerton, England. As a child, she played football before her grandfather introduced her to golf and to her first coach.

In 2006, Ewart began attending the University of New Mexico (UNM). During this era, she still played in a number of significant events in the United Kingdom. She was on the Great Britain and Ireland Curtis Cup team in 2008 which was defeated by the United States. Ewart is also a two-time English Women's Strokeplay champion: she won in 2008 and again in 2009. She graduated with a degree in psychology from UNM in 2010. While at New Mexico, she had five collegiate wins and was a two-time NCAA All-American in 2009 and 2010.

== Professional career ==
In 2010, Ewart turned professional. She played on the Futures Tour. She qualified for the LPGA Tour in 2011. Her most successful season to date is 2013 when she finished tied for 7th in the 2013 Kraft Nabisco Championship and tied for 4th in the 2013 U.S. Women's Open. Her best finish to date is 2nd at the 2017 Women's British Open.

She qualified for the Ladies European Tour (LET) in 2012 by winning at the LET Final Qualifying Tournament. After the conclusion of the 2013 Women's British Open, she was chosen by Liselotte Neumann as one of her four captain's selections to the 2013 European Solheim Cup Team for the matches to be held in Colorado. In 2017, she had the fourth highest total of LET Solheim Cup, qualifying her to compete for the 2017 European Solheim Cup Team held in Des Moines, Iowa. Unlike many of her fellow competitors she used an anchored putter until anchoring was banned by the R&A.

After 11 seasons on tour, Shadoff won her first LPGA Tour event at the 2022 LPGA Mediheal Championship after 246 starts.

== Personal life ==
Ewart married Adam Shadoff, now a sports anchor and reporter at WOFL-TV in Orlando, Florida, on 19 January 2013.

== Professional wins (1) ==
=== LPGA Tour wins (1) ===
Legend
Major championships (0)
Other LPGA Tour (1)

No.	Date	Tournament	Winning score	To par	Margin of victory	Runner-up	Winner's share ($)
1	9 Oct 2022	LPGA Mediheal Championship	64-69-69-71=273	−15	1 stroke	(Japan) Yuka Saso	270,000

== Results in LPGA majors ==
Results not in chronological order.

Tournament	2012	2013	2014	2015	2016	2017	2018	2019	2020
Chevron Championship	T26	T7	T39	T57	T18	CUT	T9	T39	T44
Women's PGA Championship	T36	CUT	CUT	CUT	T17	T36	T25	CUT	WD
U.S. Women's Open		T4	T57	CUT	T8	CUT	T27	T68	T63
The Evian Championship ^		T44	T20	T70	T12	CUT	CUT		NT
Women's British Open	CUT	CUT	CUT		T25	2	CUT	T59	T39

Tournament	2021	2022	2023	2024	2025	2026
Chevron Championship	CUT	70	T37	T50		CUT
U.S. Women's Open	CUT	T48	T29			
Women's PGA Championship	CUT	CUT	T15	CUT	CUT	
The Evian Championship	CUT	T22	T28	CUT		T35
Women's British Open	CUT	T19	T61	CUT		CUT

^ The Evian Championship was added as a major in 2013

Top 10
Did not play

CUT = missed the half-way cut
WD = withdrew
NT = no tournament
"T" = tied

=== Summary ===
Tournament	Wins	2nd	3rd	Top-5	Top-10	Top-25	Events	Cuts made
Chevron Championship	0	0	0	0	2	3	14	11
U.S. Women's Open	0	0	0	1	2	2	11	8
Women's PGA Championship	0	0	0	0	0	3	14	6
The Evian Championship	0	0	0	0	0	3	11	7
Women's British Open	0	1	0	1	1	3	13	6
Totals	0	1	0	2	5	14	63	38

- Most consecutive cuts made – 9 (2022 Evian – 2024 U.S. Women's Open)
- Longest streak of top-10s – 1 (five times)

== LPGA Tour career summary ==
Year	Tournaments played	Cuts made*	Wins	2nd	3rd	Top 10s	Best finish	Earnings (US$)	Money list rank	Scoring average	Scoring rank
2011	2	0	0	0	0	0	CUT	n/a	n/a	72.31	n/a
2012	21	18	0	0	0	2	T7	217,439	56	72.72	63
2013	24	21	0	0	1	4	T3	493,091	29	71.23	24
2014	25	22	0	0	0	2	T5	312,060	52	71.76	46
2015	21	10	0	0	0	0	T23	71,765	98	72.77	93
2016	26	25	0	1	0	3	T2	593,328	32	70.86	23
2017	26	20	0	1	0	3	2	623,086	31	70.92	38
2018	24	20	0	0	0	2	T7	393,578	57	71.26	35
2019	21	18	0	0	0	4	T8	329,530	59	70.90	33
2020	15	13	0	1	0	3	T2	356,618	33	71.22	23
2021	19	8	0	0	0	2	T7	116,443	105	71.69	81
2022	25	21	1	0	1	3	1	857,128	31	70.51	27
2023	24	21	0	0	1	6	T3	696,773	40	70.54	26
2024	24	12	0	0	0	0	T12	261,790	92	72.45	128
2025	16	9	0	0	0	0	T18	97,154	133	72.33	116
Totals^	313	238	1	3	3	34	1	5,419,783	92		

^ Official as of 2025 season
^ Includes matchplay and other tournaments without a cut.

== World ranking ==
Position in Women's World Golf Rankings at the end of each calendar year.

Year	Ranking	Source
2009	619	
2010	480	
2011	517	
2012	138	
2013	52	
2014	73	
2015	206	
2016	59	
2017	43	
2018	59	
2019	86	
2020	78	
2021	111	
2022	60	
2023	58	
2024	150	
2025	352	

== Team appearances ==
Amateur

- European Girls' Team Championship (representing England): 2005 (winners)
- European Lady Junior's Team Championship (representing England): 2006
- European Ladies' Team Championship (representing England): 2007, 2008, 2009
- Curtis Cup (representing Great Britain & Ireland): 2008
- Espirito Santo Trophy (representing England): 2008
- Vagliano Trophy (representing Great Britain & Ireland): 2009

Professional

- Solheim Cup (representing Europe): 2013 (winners), 2017, 2019 (winners)
- International Crown (representing England): 2016, 2018, 2023

=== Solheim Cup record ===
Year	Total matches	Total W–L–H	Singles W–L–H	Foursomes W–L–H	Fourballs W–L–H	Points won	Points %
Career	10	3–6–1	1–2–0	0–3–0	2–1–1	3.5	35.0
2013	3	2–1–0	1–0–0 def. B. Lincicome 3&2	0–1–0 lost w/ C. Matthew 3&2	1–0–0 won w/ C. Hull 2 up	2	66.7
2017	4	1–3–0	0–1–0 lost to L. Salas 1 dn	0–1–0 lost w/ C. Masson 5&3	1–1–0 lost w/ M. Sagström 3&1 won w/ A. Nordqvist 4&2	1	25.0
2019	3	0–2–1	0–1–0 lost to B. Altomare 5&4	0–1–0 lost w/ C. Masson 6&4	0–0–1 halved w/ C. Masson	0.5	16.7
