= Carlota Ciganda =

Spanish professional golfer (born 1990)

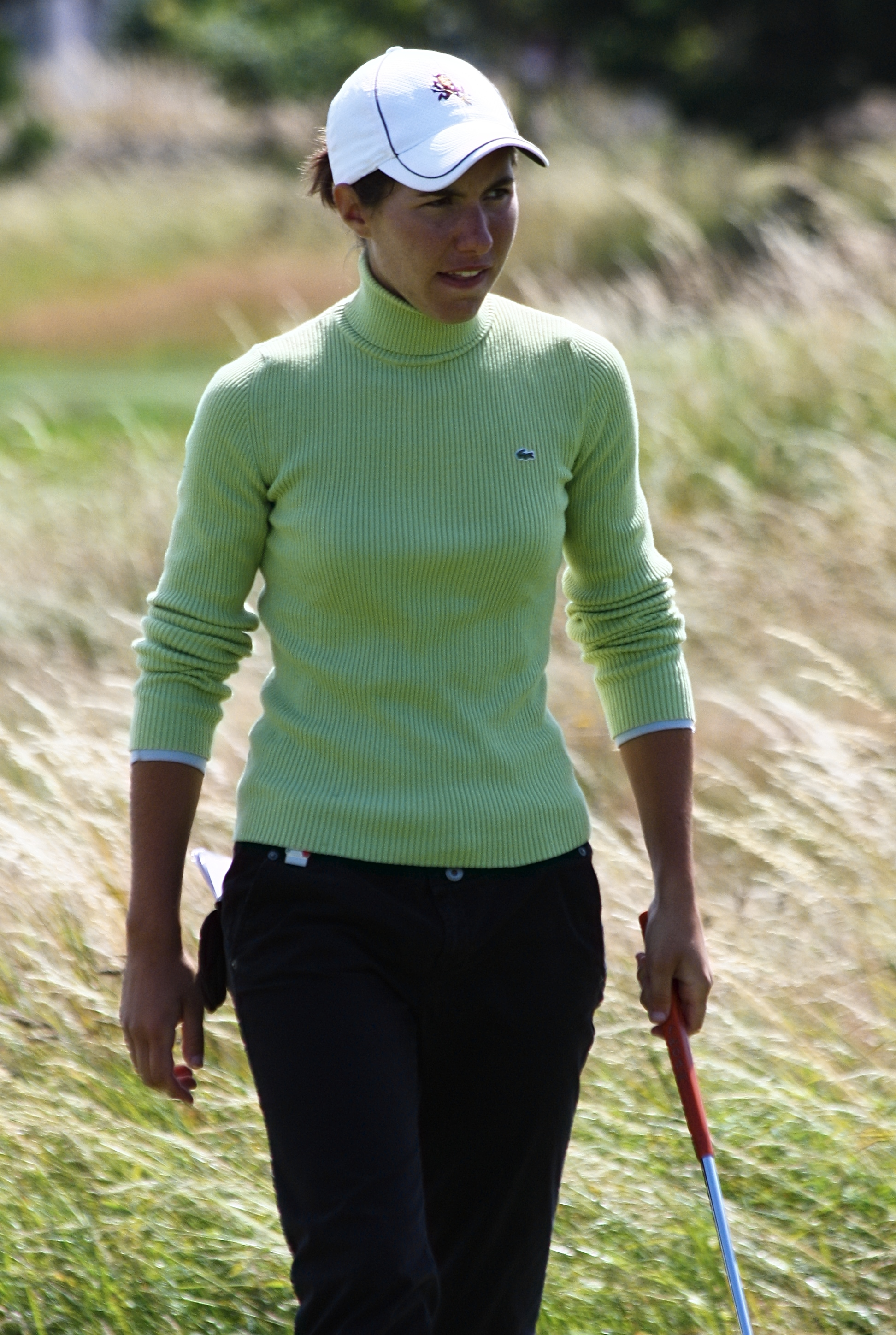
- Ciganda at the 2009 Women's British Open

Personal information
- Nationality: Spain
- Born: 1 June 1990 (age 36) Pamplona, Spain
- Height: 5 ft 8 in (173 cm)

Career
- Sport: Golf
- College: Arizona State University
- Turned professional: 2011
- Current tours: Ladies European Tour (joined 2012); LPGA Tour (joined 2012)
- Professional wins: 12

Number of wins by tour
- LPGA Tour: 3
- Ladies European Tour: 8
- LPGA of Korea Tour: 1
- Other: 1

Best results in LPGA major championships
- Chevron Championship: T4: 2015, 2019
- Women's PGA C'ship: T3: 2020, 2023
- U.S. Women's Open: 3rd: 2018
- Women's British Open: T7/7th: 2018, 2019
- Evian Championship: T3: 2022

Achievements and awards
- Ladies European Tour Rookie of the Year: 2012
- Ladies European Tour Order of Merit winner: 2012
- Ladies European Tour Player of the Year: 2012
Medal record
Mediterranean Games
Gold medal – first place	2009 Pescara	Women's team
Silver medal – second place	2009 Pescara	Individual

Carlota Ciganda Machiñena (born 1 June 1990) is a professional golfer from Spain who plays on the Ladies European Tour and the LPGA Tour. She won the LET's Order of Merit (money title) in her debut season in 2012, and was also named Player of the Year and Rookie of the Year.

== Early life and amateur career ==
Ciganda was born in Pamplona, Spain. She started to play golf aged five, influenced by her father. Her uncle is the former football player and coach José Ángel Ziganda.

She attended college in the United States at Arizona State University from 2008 to 2011, where she majored in Business Administration. Ciganda speaks four languages.

Ciganda enjoyed a successful amateur career, winning the British Ladies Amateur in 2007. She returned to the finals in 2009, but was runner-up to compatriot and ASU teammate Azahara Muñoz. Ciganda won the European Ladies Amateur Championship in 2004 and 2008, and was the Spanish National age group champion from 2000 to 2006. She was a member of Spain's 2006 and 2008 Espirito Santo Trophy teams, finishing second in 2008; 2005 and 2007 European Junior Solheim Cup teams and 2004 and 2006 European Junior Ryder Cup teams. While at Arizona State, she was a member of the Sun Devils' NCAA championship team in 2009 as a freshman, and made conference history as the first to win consecutive Pac-10 Championships in 2009 and 2010; she finished third in 2011.

Ciganda played in a number of professional tournaments as an amateur and first took part in the 2005 Tenerife Ladies Open at age 14. Although on that occasion she did not make the cut, she finished as the best Spanish representative in several professional tournaments, including the 2007 Open De España Femenino, when she finished eighth and the 2008 Tenerife Ladies Open when she was third, three shots behind the winner, Rebecca Hudson.

== Professional career ==
In 2011, Ciganda turned professional. She made her debut the following month at the Tenerife Ladies Match Play, an unofficial event on the LET schedule, where she finished second to Becky Brewerton. She competed on the Ladies European Tour Access Series that season, winning the Murcia Ladies Open. In the LPGA Final Qualifying Tournament in December 2011 she finished tied 34th, earning Priority List Category 20 for the 2012 LPGA Tour season and went on to finish third at the LET Final Qualifying School tournament later that month to earn full playing rights for the 2012 Ladies European Tour season.

In her first full season on the 2012 Ladies European Tour, Ciganda won the ISPS Handa Order of Merit and was also named Players' Player of the Year, as voted for by the LET members. She played in 19 tournaments, with two victories at the Deloitte Ladies Open and the China Suzhou Taihu Open and had ten additional top-10s finishes. Her efforts won her the LET Rookie of the Year award and she ended the season ranked second on the European Solheim Cup points list with total earnings of €251,289.95.

Ciganda was the ladies' winner of the 2019 AON Risk Reward Challenge, collecting the $1,000,000 prize.

In 2023, at the Evian Championship, Ciganda was disqualified "for signing an incorrect scorecard". She had been issued a two-stroke penalty for slow play on the 9th hole. Afterward, Ciganda appealed the ruling with tournament officials but was denied. Despite this, she turned in her scorecard without adding the two-stroke penalty and was disqualified.

== Amateur wins ==
- 2004 European Ladies Amateur Championship
- 2005 Spanish International Ladies Amateur Championship
- 2006 Spanish International Ladies Amateur Championship
- 2007 British Ladies Amateur
- 2008 European Ladies Amateur Championship, Portuguese International Ladies Amateur Championship, French International Ladies Amateur Championship

== Professional wins (12) ==
=== LPGA Tour wins (3) ===
No.	Date	Tournament	Winning score	To par	Margin of victory	Runner(s)-up	Winner's share ($)
1	16 Oct 2016	LPGA KEB Hana Bank Championship^{[1]}	69-70-69-70=278	–10	Playoff	(United States) Alison Lee	300,000
2	13 Nov 2016	Citibanamex Lorena Ochoa Invitational	67-72-68-68=275	–13	2 strokes	(United States) Austin Ernst (England) Jodi Ewart Shadoff (France) Karine Icher (Australia) Sarah Jane Smith (United States) Angela Stanford	200,000
3	14 Jun 2025	Meijer LPGA Classic	69-67-69-67=272	–16	1 stroke	(South Korea) Choi Hye-jin	450,000

^{1} Co-sanctioned by the LPGA of Korea Tour.

LPGA Tour playoff record (1–2)

No.	Year	Tournament	Opponent(s)	Result
1	2014	CME Group Tour Championship	(Paraguay) Julieta Granada (New Zealand) Lydia Ko	Ko won with par on fourth extra hole Granada eliminated by par on second hole
2	2016	Meijer LPGA Classic	(South Korea) Kim Sei-young	Lost to birdie on first extra hole
3	2016	LPGA KEB–Hana Bank Championship	(United States) Alison Lee	Won with birdie on first extra hole

=== Ladies European Tour (8) ===
No.	Date	Tournament	Winning score	To par	Margin of victory	Runner(s)-up
1	3 Jun 2012	Deloitte Ladies Open	71-67-69=207	–9	2 strokes	(Finland) Ursula Wikström
2	28 Oct 2012	China Suzhou Taihu Open	65-70-64=199	–17	7 strokes	(Germany) Caroline Masson
3	2 Jun 2013	UniCredit Ladies German Open	68-33=101	–6	Playoff	(England) Charley Hull
4	29 Sep 2019	Estrella Damm Mediterranean Ladies Open	72-68-65-71=276	−8	1 stroke	(Germany) Esther Henseleit
5	28 Nov 2021	Andalucia Costa Del Sol Open De España	70-66-70-67=273	−11	4 strokes	(Sweden) Maja Stark
6	10 Jul 2022	Estrella Damm Mediterranean Ladies Open	65-67-68-70=270	−18	2 strokes	(Scotland) Laura Beveridge
7	21 May 2023	Aramco Team Series – Florida	72-69-73=214	−2	1 stroke	(Czech Republic) Klára Spilková
8	1 Dec 2024	Andalucia Costa Del Sol Open De España	67-66-66-71=270	−18	1 stroke	(Belgium) Manon De Roey

LET playoff record (1–1)

No.	Year	Tournament	Opponent	Result
1	2013	UniCredit Ladies German Open	(England) Charley Hull	Won with birdie on first extra hole
2	2017	Estrella Damm Mediterranean Ladies Open	(Sweden) Anna Nordqvist (England) Florentyna Parker	Parker won with birdie on fourth extra hole Ciganda eliminated by birdie on first hole

=== LET Access Series (1) ===
No.	Date	Tournament	Winning score	To par	Margin of victory	Runner-up
1	19 Nov 2011	Murcia Ladies Open	68-76-70=214	–5	Playoff	(Denmark) Julie Tvede

LET Access Series playoff record (1–0)

No.	Year	Tournament	Opponent	Result
1	2011	Murcia Ladies Open	(Denmark) Julie Tvede	Won with birdie on sixth extra hole

== Results in LPGA majors ==
Results not in chronological order.

Tournament	2005	2006	2007	2008	2009	2010	2011	2012	2013	2014	2015	2016	2017	2018	2019	2020	2021	2022	2023	2024	2025	2026
Chevron Championship									T66	T61	T4	T56	T60	CUT	T4	T24	CUT	CUT	T12	6	T9	T12
U.S. Women's Open								T39	T57	T63	CUT	CUT	T5	3	T22	CUT	T49	T28	T20	T19	CUT	CUT
Women's PGA Championship									T37	T13	CUT	CUT	T20	T33	T48	T3	CUT	CUT	T3	CUT	T71	CUT
The Evian Championship ^									T52	CUT	T38	T17	T32	T33	10	NT	CUT	T3	DQ	CUT	CUT	CUT
Women's British Open	T52		CUT		CUT			T17	CUT	T29	CUT	T31	T23	T7	7	T51	T34	CUT	CUT	T37	CUT	CUT

^ The Evian Championship was added as a major in 2013

Top 10
Did not play

CUT = missed the half-way cut
DQ = disqualified
NT = no tournament
T = tied

=== Summary ===
Tournament	Wins	2nd	3rd	Top-5	Top-10	Top-25	Events	Cuts made
Chevron Championship	0	0	0	2	4	7	14	11
U.S. Women's Open	0	0	1	2	2	5	15	10
Women's PGA Championship	0	0	2	2	2	4	14	8
The Evian Championship	0	0	1	1	2	3	13	7
Women's British Open	0	0	0	0	2	4	18	10
Totals	0	0	4	7	12	23	74	46

- Most consecutive cuts made – 12 (2018 US Open – 2020 PGA)
- Longest streak of top-10s – 2 (2019 Evian – 2019 British Open)

== Professional career summary ==
=== LPGA Tour ===
Year	Tournaments played	Cuts made	Wins	2nd	3rd	Top 10s	Best finish	Earnings ($)	Money list rank	Scoring average	Scoring rank
2012	3	3	0	0	0	0	T17	$79,679	85	73.25	n/a
2013	19	13	0	1	0	2	2	355,949	40	71.98	49
2014	23	18	0	1	0	1	T2	367,280	44	72.17	64
2015	25	19	0	1	0	3	2	404,849	42	71.77	51
2016	26	22	2	1	0	7	1	1,116,199	14	70.56	16
2017	22	20	0	0	1	7	T3	765,008	24	70.35	21
2018	25	22	0	2	1	9	2	1,244,610	8	70.09	8
2019	23	22	0	1	1	8	T2	998,654	15	69.94	10
2020	12	11	0	0	1	3	T3	477,707	20	70.58	9
2021	22	19	0	0	0	2	T5	329,944	61	71.17	56
2022	24	17	0	0	1	4	T3	826,614	33	70.58	29
2023	21	17	0	0	2	6	T3	1,096,662	23	70.20	10
2024	22	17	0	0	1	3	T3	853,574	46	71.11	42
2025	21	16	1	0	1	5	1	1,115,977	37	71.00	49

Official as of 2025 season

=== Ladies European Tour ===
Year	LET wins	Earnings (€)	Money list rank	Scoring average
2012	2	251,290	1	70.46
2013	1	173,329	5	70.88
2014	0	140,730	5	70.32
2015	0	19,489	n/a	70.78
2016	0	57,266	n/a	71.36
2017	0	160,798	2	69.41
2018	0	153,094		69.31

Official as of 2018 season

== World ranking ==
Position in Women's World Golf Rankings at the end of each calendar year.

Year	Ranking	Source
2007	502	
2008	504	
2009	705	
2010	605	
2011	291	
2012	50	
2013	39	
2014	46	
2015	51	
2016	20	
2017	20	
2018	15	
2019	16	
2020	15	
2021	46	
2022	52	
2023	29	
2024	37	
2025	35	

== Team appearances ==
Amateur

- European Lady Junior's Team Championship (representing Spain): 2004 (winners), 2005
- European Girls' Team Championship (representing Spain): 2005
- Espirito Santo Trophy (representing Spain): 2006, 2008, 2010
- Junior Solheim Cup (representing Europe): 2005, 2007 (winners)
- Junior Ryder Cup (representing Europe): 2004 (winners), 2006 (tie, cup retained)
- European Ladies' Team Championship (representing Spain): 2007 (winners), 2008, 2009, 2010

Professional

- Solheim Cup (representing Europe): 2013 (winners), 2015, 2017, 2019 (winners), 2021 (winners), 2023 (tie, cup retained), 2024, 2026 (winners)
- International Crown (representing Spain): 2014 (winners)

=== Solheim Cup record ===
Year	Total matches	Total W–L–H	Singles W–L–H	Foursomes W–L–H	Fourballs W–L–H	Points won	Points %
Career	30	13–12–5	5–2–1	2–4–1	6–6–3	15.5	51.7
2013	3	3–0–0	1–0–0 def. M. Pressel 4&2	0–0–0	2–0–0 won w/ S. Pettersen 1 up won w/ A. Muñoz 1 up	3	100.0
2015	4	1–1–2	0–0–1 halved w/ L. Thompson	1–0–0 won w/ M. Reid 4&3	0–1–1 halved w/ M. Reid lost w/ A. Muñoz 3&2	2	50.0
2017	4	1–3–0	1–0–0 def. B. Lincicome 4&3	0–1–0 lost w/ C. Masson 1 dn	0–2–0 lost w/ E. Pedersen 6&5 lost w/ M. Reid 2 dn	1	25.0
2019	5	1–2–2	1–0–0 def. D. Kang 1 up	0–1–1 halved w/ B. Law lost w/ B. Law 6&5	0–1–1 halved w/ B. Law lost w/ A. Muñoz 2&1	2	40.0
2021	3	1–2–0	0–1–0 lost to B. Altomare 2&1	0–0–0	1–1–0 lost w/ S. Popov 1 dn won w/ N. Madsen 1 up	1	33.3
2023	4	4–0–0	1–0–0 def. N. Korda 2&1	1–0–0 won w/ E. Pedersen 2&1	2–0–0 won w/ L. Grant 4&2 won w/ L. Grant 2&1	4	100.0
2024	4	1–3–0	0–1–0 lost to R. Zhang 6&4	0–2–0 lost w/ L. Grant 3&2 lost w/ E. Pedersen 1 dn	1–0–0 won w/ E. Pedersen 2&1	1	25.0
2026	3	1–1–1	1–0–0 def. J. Kupcho 4&2	0–0–0	0–1–1 halved w/ J. Ramirez lost w/ C. Boutier 1 dn	1.5	50.0
