= Caroline Masson =

German professional golfer (born 1989)

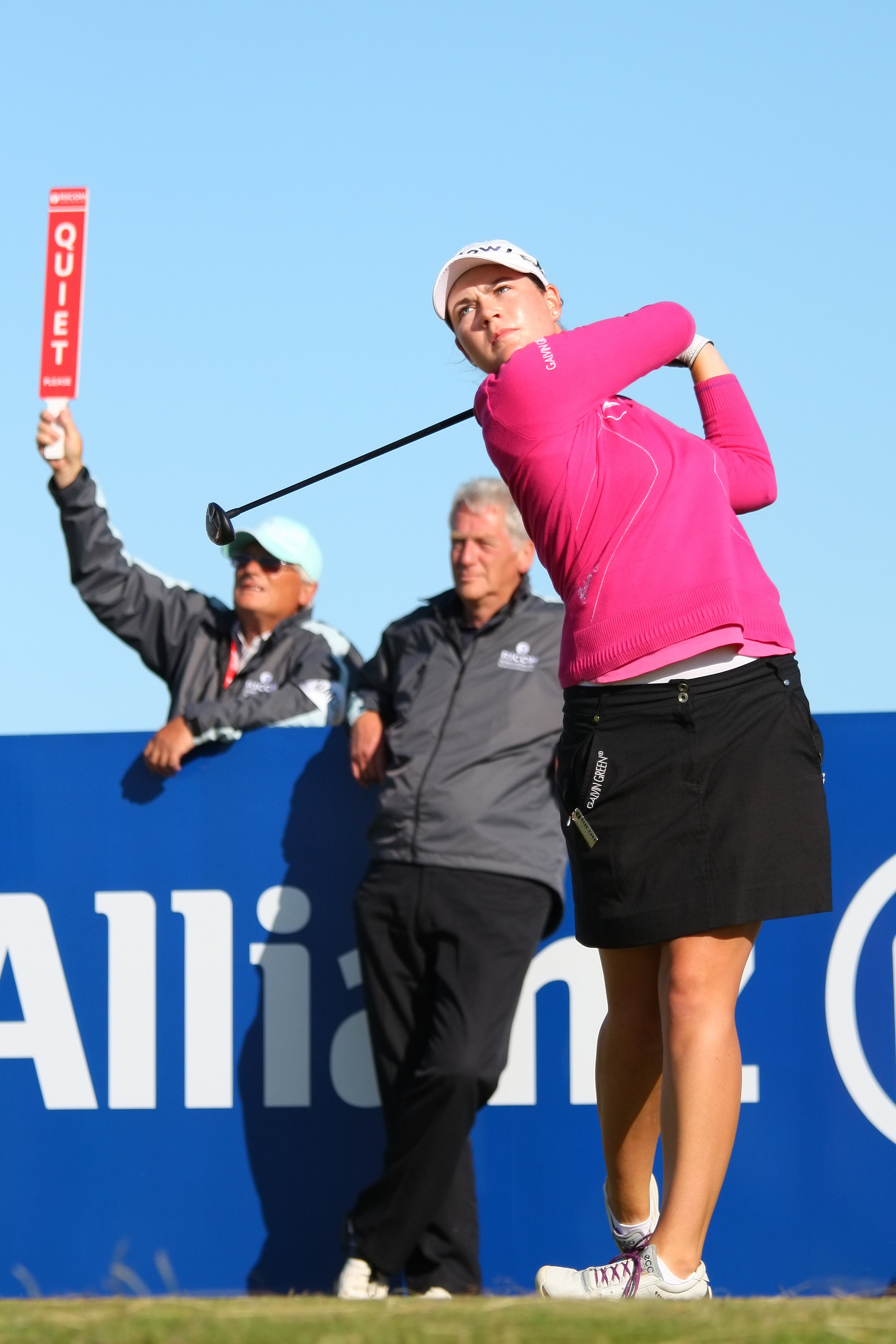
- Masson at the 2013 Women's British Open

Personal information
- Nickname: Caro
- Nationality: Germany
- Born: 14 May 1989 (age 37) Gladbeck, West Germany
- Height: 5 ft 8 in (173 cm)

Career
- Sport: Golf
- College: Oklahoma State University (one year)
- Turned professional: 2009
- Current tours: LET (joined 2010); LPGA Tour (joined 2013)
- Professional wins: 2

Number of wins by tour
- LPGA Tour: 1
- Ladies European Tour: 1

Best results in LPGA major championships
- Chevron Championship: T6: 2016
- Women's PGA C'ship: T12: 2013
- U.S. Women's Open: T28: 2014
- Women's British Open: T3: 2017
- Evian Championship: T33: 2018

Caroline Masson (born 14 May 1989) is a German professional golfer, currently playing on the Ladies European Tour (LET).

== Amateur and college career ==
Born and raised in Gladbeck in North Rhine-Westphalia, Masson had a decorated amateur golf career. She competed for Germany in the 2006 Espirito Santo Trophy (World Amateur Team Championship) and won the German Stroke Play Championship. She also represented Europe in the 2005 and 2007 Junior Solheim Cup. In 2008, she advanced to match play at the British Ladies Amateur, won the German Match Play Championship and the German Ladies International and was selected to represent Germany at the 2008 Espirito Santo Trophy.

After graduating from secondary school in Gladbeck in 2008, Masson accepted a golf scholarship to Oklahoma State University and played one year for the Cowgirls in 2008–09 before turning pro in December 2009.

== Professional career ==
In late 2009, Masson entered the four-round LET Final Qualifying School as an amateur at La Manga Club, Spain. After earning medalist honors on 21 December, she turned professional immediately and joined the LET on 1 January 2010.

Masson made 14 of 16 cuts on the LET in 2010, but missed the cut by ten strokes in her first major, the 2010 Women's British Open at Royal Birkdale. In her second major, the 2011 Women's British Open at Carnoustie, she led after the second and third rounds. Paired with defending and eventual champion Yani Tseng in the final round, Masson carded a 78 (+6) to finish tied for fifth, seven shots back.

Masson won her first LET event at the 2012 South African Women's Open, winning by one stroke over Lee-Anne Pace and Danielle Montgomery.

Masson finished T-11 at the LPGA Final Qualifying Tournament to earn her LPGA Tour card for 2013.

On 4 September 2016 Masson captured her first LPGA Tour victory by winning the Manulife LPGA Classic.

== Professional wins (2) ==
=== LPGA Tour (1) ===
No.	Date	Tournament	Winning score	Margin of victory	Runners-up
1	4 Sep 2016	Manulife LPGA Classic	−16 (68-69-68-67=272)	1 stroke	(France) Karine Icher (South Korea) Lee Mi-hyang (Australia) Minjee Lee

=== Ladies European Tour (1) ===
No.	Date	Tournament	Winning score	Margin of victory	Runners-up
1	15 Jul 2012	South African Women's Open	–1 (69-75-71=215)	1 stroke	(England) Danielle Montgomery (South Africa) Lee-Anne Pace

== Results in LPGA majors ==
Results not in chronological order before 2019.

Tournament	2010	2011	2012	2013	2014	2015	2016	2017	2018	2019	2020
Chevron Championship			T49	T13	T11	T57	T6	T56	T9	T52	T32
U.S. Women's Open				T54	T28	CUT	54	CUT	T34	T30	CUT
Women's PGA Championship				T12	T17	WD	CUT	CUT	T57	T43	CUT
The Evian Championship ^				T37	CUT	CUT	CUT	72	T33	T55	NT
Women's British Open	CUT	T5	CUT	CUT	WD	CUT	T25	T3	CUT	T11	T7

Tournament	2021	2022	2023	2024	2025
Chevron Championship	T63	T17		T40	CUT
U.S. Women's Open	CUT	T51		CUT	
Women's PGA Championship	T56	CUT		CUT	CUT
The Evian Championship	CUT	T43		CUT	
Women's British Open	CUT	CUT			

^ The Evian Championship was added as a major in 2013.

Win
Top 10
Did not play

CUT = missed the half-way cut
WD = withdrew
NT = no tournament
"T" = tied

=== Summary ===
Tournament	Wins	2nd	3rd	Top-5	Top-10	Top-25	Events	Cuts made
Chevron Championship	0	0	0	0	2	5	13	12
U.S. Women's Open	0	0	0	0	0	0	11	6
Women's PGA Championship	0	0	0	0	0	2	12	5
The Evian Championship	0	0	0	0	0	0	10	5
Women's British Open	0	0	1	2	3	5	13	5
Totals	0	0	1	2	5	12	59	33

- Most consecutive cuts made – 8 (2018 Evian – 2020 ANA)
- Longest streak of top-10s – 1 (five times)

== Ladies European Tour career summary ==
Year	Tournaments played	Cuts made	Wins	2nd	3rd	Top 10s	Best finish	Earnings (€)	Money list rank	Scoring average	Scoring rank
2008	2	2	0	0	0	0	30	n/a	n/a	72.00	n/a
2010	16	14	0	0	1	4	3	81,180	26	72.25	T31
2011	16	15	0	1	0	7	T2	167,187	5	71.17	15
2012	16	12	1	3	0	5	1	171,438	2	72.22	
2013	7	4	0	0	1	1	3	52,311		71.95	
2014	4	3	0	0	2	2	3	62,733	–	70.86	–

== World ranking ==
Position in Women's World Golf Rankings at the end of each calendar year.

Year	World ranking	Source
2010	215	
2011	97	
2012	48	
2013	60	
2014	54	
2015	77	
2016	56	
2017	58	
2018	41	
2019	37	
2020	51	
2021	52	
2022	80	
2023	254	
2024	364	
2025	371	

== Team appearances ==
Amateur

- European Girls' Team Championship (representing Germany): 2005, 2006 (winners), 2007
- Junior Solheim Cup (representing Europe): 2005, 2007 (winners)
- Espirito Santo Trophy (representing Germany): 2006, 2008
- European Ladies' Team Championship (representing Germany): 2008, 2009

Professional

- Solheim Cup (representing Europe): 2013 (winners), 2015, 2017, 2019 (winners)

=== Solheim Cup record ===
Year	Total matches	Total W–L–H	Singles W–L–H	Foursomes W–L–H	Fourballs W–L–H	Points won	Points %
Career	14	3–8–3	1–3–0	0–3–1	2–2–2	4.5	32.1
2013	4	2–1–1	0–1–0 lost to L. Thompson 4&3	0–0–1 halved with C. Matthew	2–0–0 won w/ C. Hedwall 2&1 won w/ C. Hedwall 2&1	2.5	62.5
2015	3	0–2–1	0–1–0 lost to G. Piller 1 dn		0–1–1 halved w/ S. Gal lost w/ C. Hedwall 1 dn	0.5	16.7
2017	4	1–3–0	1–0–0 def. M.Wie 4&2	0–2–0 lost w/ C. Ciganda 1 dn lost w/ J. Ewart Shadoff 5&3	0–1–0 lost w/ F. Parker 3&2	1	25.0
2019	3	0–2–1	0–1–0 lost to J. Korda 3&2	0–1–0 lost w/ J. Ewart Shadoff 6&4	0–0–1 halved w/ J. Ewart Shadoff	0.5	16.7
