= 2002 Ladies European Tour =

Golf tournament series

2002 Ladies European Tour season
- Duration: February 2002 – October 2002
- Number of official events: 15
- Order of Merit: (Spain) Paula Martí
- Player of the Year: (Sweden) Annika Sörenstam
- Rookie of the Year: (England) Kirsty S. Taylor
- Lowest stroke average: (Sweden) Sophie Gustafson

The 2002 Ladies European Tour was a series of golf tournaments for elite female golfers from around the world which took place from January through December 2002. The tournaments were sanctioned by the Ladies European Tour (LET).

== Tournaments ==
The table below shows the 2002 schedule. The numbers in brackets after the winners' names show the number of career wins they had on the Ladies European Tour up to and including that event. This is only shown for members of the tour.

Date	Name	Venue	Location	Winner	Prize fund	Prize fund (€)	Notes
24 Feb	ANZ Ladies Masters	RACV Royal Pines Resort	Australia	(Sweden) Annika Sörenstam (7)	$750,000	€433,969	Co-sanctioned by the ALPG Tour
3 Mar	AAMI Women's Australian Open	Yarra Yarra Golf Club	Australia	(Australia) Karrie Webb (5)	$500,000	€289,318	Co-sanctioned by the ALPG Tour
5 May	Tenerife Ladies Open	Golf Del Sur, San Miguel de Abona	Spain	(Spain) Raquel Carriedo (4)	€200,000	€200,000	
12 May	Ladies Irish Open	Killarney Golf & Fishing Club	Ireland	(Denmark) Iben Tinning (1)	€165,000	€165,000	
19 May	La Perla Ladies Italian Open	UNA Poggio Dei Medici Golf Resort	Italy	(Denmark) Iben Tinning (2)	£117,000	€190,000	
26 May	Ladies Open de Costa Azul	Aroeira Golf Club	Portugal	(Japan) Kanna Takanashi (n/a)	€70,000	€70,000	
2 Jun	Caja Duero Open de Espana Femenino	Campo de Golf de Salamanca	Spain	(France) Karine Icher (3)	€250,000	€250,000	
15 Jun	**Evian Masters**	Evian Masters Golf Club	France	(Sweden) Annika Sörenstam (8)	$2,100,000	€2,371,407	Co-sanctioned by the LPGA Tour
23 Jun	Arras Open de France Dames	Golf d'Arras	France	(New Zealand) Lynnette Brooky (2)	€275,000	€275,000	
4 Aug	P4 Norwegian Masters	Oslo Golf Club	Norway	(England) Laura Davies (34)	£220,000	€363,880	
11 Aug	**Weetabix Women's British Open**	Turnberry GC	Scotland	(Australia) Karrie Webb (6)	£1,000,000	€1,654,000	Co-sanctioned by the LPGA Tour
18 Aug	Compaq Open	Vasatorps Golfklubb	Sweden	(Sweden) Annika Sörenstam (9)	£300,000	€537,550	
25 Aug	Wales WPGA Championship of Europe	Royal Porthcawl Golf Club	Wales	(Sweden) Åsa Gottmo (1)	£400,000	€661,600	
22 Sep	Solheim Cup	Interlachen Country Club	United States	United States	Team event; no prize money		Co-sanctioned by the LPGA Tour
5 Oct	Biarritz Ladies Classic	Biarritz le Phare GC	France	(Sweden) Sophie Gustafson (8)	€165,000	€165,000	

Major championships in bold.

== Order of Merit rankings ==
Rank	Player	Country	Points
1	Paula Martí	Spain	6,589.50
2	Maria Hjorth	Sweden	6,483.65
3	Sophie Gustafson	Sweden	5,613.25
4	Iben Tinning	Denmark	5,472.46
5	Åsa Gottmo	Sweden	4,851.51
6	Karine Icher	France	4,642.04
7	Marine Monnet	France	4,500.13
8	Suzann Pettersen	Norway	4,403.40
9	Laura Davies	England	4,359.92
10	Raquel Carriedo	Spain	4,291.38

== See also ==
- 2002 LPGA Tour
