= Karine Icher =

French professional golfer (born 1979)

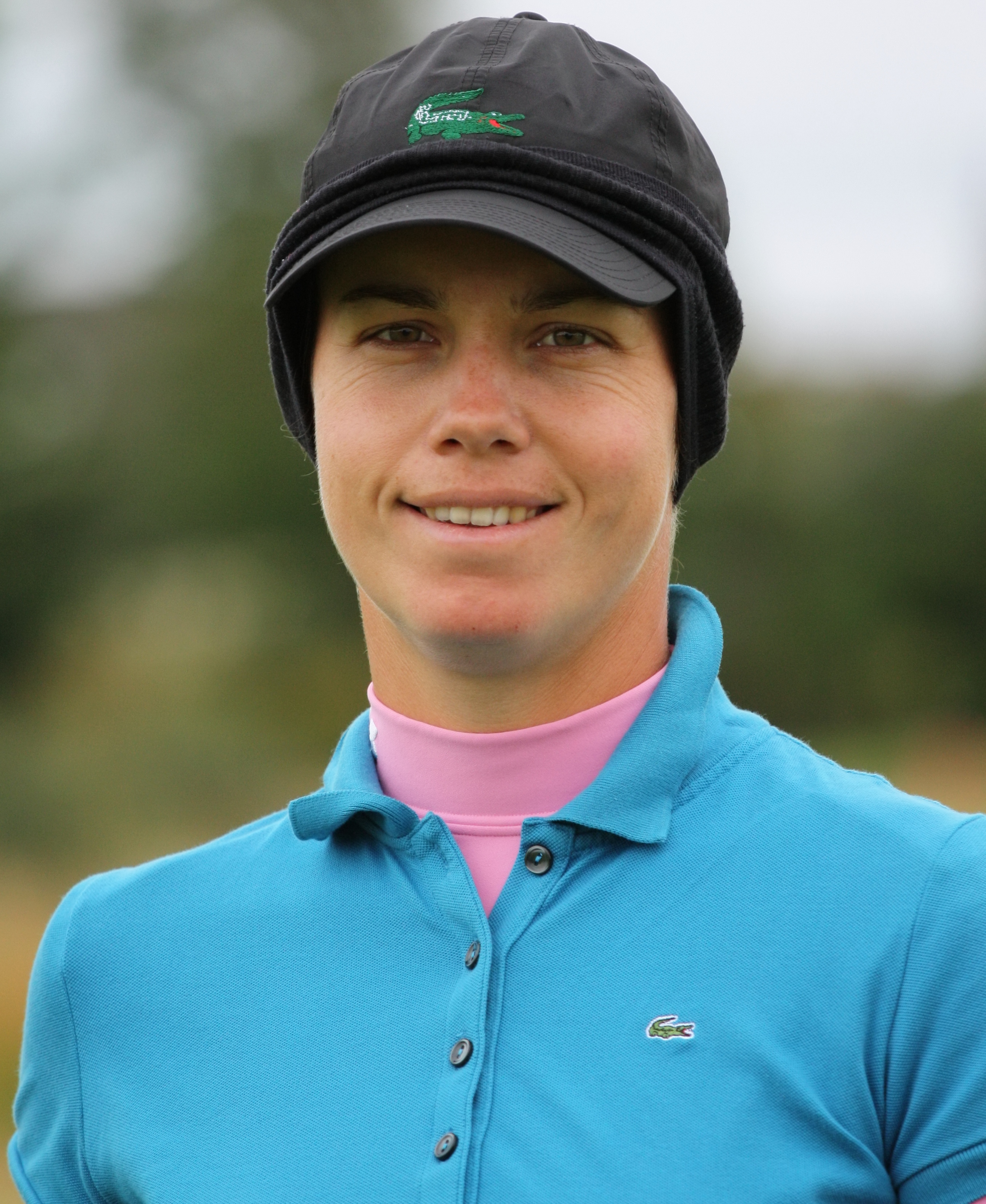
- Karine Icher at the 2009 Women's British Open

Personal information
- Nationality: France
- Born: 26 January 1979 (age 47) Châteauroux, France
- Height: 5 ft 7 in (1.70 m)
- Spouse: Fred Bonnargent (m. 2006)

Career
- Sport: Golf
- Turned professional: 2000
- Former tours: LPGA Tour (joined 2003); Ladies European Tour (joined 2001)
- Professional wins: 5

Number of wins by tour
- Ladies European Tour: 5

Best results in LPGA major championships
- Chevron Championship: 10th: 2017
- Women's PGA C'ship: T13: 2015
- U.S. Women's Open: T6: 2005
- Women's British Open: T10: 2006
- Evian Championship: T20: 2015

Karine Icher (born 26 January 1979) is a French professional golfer who formerly played on the U.S.-based LPGA Tour and the Ladies European Tour.

== Early life and amateur career ==
In 1979, Icher was born in Châteauroux, Indre. She started playing golf at the age of 10. She reached early success and was twice Junior Champion of France winning the Girls 15-16 age group in 1994 and the 17-18 age group in 1996.

In 1997, she was a member of the victorious European team in the Vagliano Trophy and won the Spanish International Ladies Amateur Championship whilst in 1998 she won the French Amateur Cup. In 1999 she was in the European Team which retained the Vagliano Trophy, was part of the victorious French team at the European Team Championship, defended the French Amateur Cup and won the International Amateur Open of Germany.

In 2000, she won the French International Lady Juniors Amateur Championship and was a member of the winning French team at the 2000 Espirito Santo Trophy, finishing fourth in the individual competition. She turned professional on 1 September 2000 and finished first at the Ladies European Tour Qualifying School to earn exempt status for the 2001 season.

== Professional career ==
=== Ladies European Tour ===
In her 2001 LET rookie season Icher won two tournaments, the Palmerston Ladies German Open and the Mexx Sport Open in the Netherlands. At the Compaq Open in August 2001 at Österåker Golf Club outside Stockholm, Sweden, Icher was leading by six strokes after 36 holes and three strokes after 54 holes. However, on the 11th hole during the final round, Icher was penalised one stroke due to slow play and continued to four-putt the hole. Raquel Carriedo finally won by a stroke and continued the 2001 season winning the LET Order of Merit. Icher finished the year third on the Order of Merit and second behind Suzann Pettersen for the LET Rookie of the Year title.

The year after, Icher got revenge on Carriedo, beating her by a single stroke winning the 2002 Caja Duero Open de Espana, In 2002 she also tied for seventh at the Evian Masters and was qualified in third place for the European 2002 Solheim Cup team, playing against United States at Interlachen Country Club, Minnesota, U.S.A. In the second day fourball Icher came to be paired with her opponent from Caja Duero Open de Espana and the Compaq Open the year before, Raguel Carriedo. The pair won their game against Cristie Kerr and Rosie Jones, but Europe lost the match 15^{1}/_{2} to 12^{1}/_{2}.

=== LPGA Tour ===
She earned non-exempt status for the 2003 LPGA season having tied for 38th at the 2002 LPGA Final Qualifying Tournament but chose to continue full-time on the Ladies European Tour. She retained her non-exempt status at the 2003 LPGA Final Qualifying Tournament by finishing tied sixty-fifth.

Icher played full-time on the Ladies European Tour in 2004, ending with five top ten finishes including a win at the Catalonia Ladies Masters. She retained her non-exempt status at the 2004 LPGA Final Qualifying Tournament by finishing tied fifty-fifth and elected to play her rookie season on the LPGA beginning the year with conditional playing privileges. A second-place finish at the Corona Morelia Championship in Mexico meant that after the re-rank she earned her full LPGA card for 2005. She finished 30th on the money list in her rookie season. She returned to the Ladies European Tour to play in the Catalonia Ladies Masters which she successfully defended. She started the 2006 season by pairing with Gwladys Nocera to represent France at the Women's World Cup of Golf.

Icher competed full time on the LPGA Tour until 2019. Without having a victory, she reached 45 career top-10s including finishing second four times, most recent twice in 2016.

== Personal life ==
In July 2011, Icher gave birth to a daughter. She did not play in the Solheim Cup in September 2011 but came back to the event two years later.

== Amateur wins ==
- 1997 Spanish International Ladies Amateur Championship
- 2000 French International Lady Juniors Amateur Championship

== Professional wins (5) ==
=== Ladies European Tour (5) ===
| No. | Date | Tournament | Winning score | To par | Margin of victory | Runner(s)-up |
|---|---|---|---|---|---|---|
| 1 | 2001 | Palmerston Ladies German Open | 71-69-70=210 | −6 | 1 stroke | (Norway) Suzann Pettersen |
| 2 | 2001 | Mexx Sport Open | 70-70-72=212 | −4 | Playoff (Note: Icher won with a birdie at the third playoff hole.) | (Norway) Suzann Pettersen |
| 3 | 2002 | Caja Duero Open de Espana | 69-69-68=277 | −11 | 1 stroke | (Spain) Raquel Carriedo |
| 4 | 2004 | Catalonia Ladies Masters | 62-66-62=190 | −17 | 9 strokes | (France) Stéphanie Arricau (Spain) Paula Marti |
| 5 | 2005 | Catalonia Ladies Masters | 70-69-68=207 | −12 | 1 stroke | (France) Gwladys Nocera (Spain) Paula Marti |

Ladies European Tour playoff record (1–0)

| No. | Year | Tournament | Opponent(s) | Result |
|---|---|---|---|---|
| 1 | 2001 | Mexx Sport Open | (Norway) Suzann Pettersen | Icher won with birdie at the third playoff hole |

== Results in LPGA majors ==
Results not in chronological order before 2019.

| Tournament | 2001 | 2002 | 2003 | 2004 | 2005 | 2006 | 2007 | 2008 | 2009 | 2010 | 2011 | 2012 |
|---|---|---|---|---|---|---|---|---|---|---|---|---|
| ANA Inspiration | | T51 | | | | T24 | T53 | CUT | | T56 | T41 | T35 |
| U.S. Women's Open | CUT | CUT | | CUT | T6 | T55 | T66 | | T67 | CUT | | |
| Women's PGA Championship | | | | | CUT | CUT | CUT | T46 | 74 | CUT | | T45 |
| Women's British Open | T60 | CUT | CUT | | CUT | T10 | T16 | CUT | CUT | T27 | | T33 |

| Tournament | 2013 | 2014 | 2015 | 2016 | 2017 | 2018 | 2019 |
|---|---|---|---|---|---|---|---|
| ANA Inspiration | T19 | T46 | T11 | T32 | 10 | CUT | |
| U.S. Women's Open | T20 | T22 | T56 | CUT | CUT | CUT | CUT |
| Women's PGA Championship | CUT | CUT | T13 | CUT | T29 | CUT | T74 |
| Women's British Open | T22 | T45 | CUT | T25 | T23 | | CUT |
| The Evian Championship ^ | CUT | T27 | T20 | T30 | T70 | | |

^ The Evian Championship was added as a major in 2013

Top 10
Did not play

CUT = missed the half-way cut
"T" tied

=== Summary ===
| Tournament | Wins | 2nd | 3rd | Top-5 | Top-10 | Top-25 | Events | Cuts made |
|---|---|---|---|---|---|---|---|---|
| ANA Inspiration | 0 | 0 | 0 | 0 | 1 | 4 | 13 | 11 |
| U.S. Women's Open | 0 | 0 | 0 | 0 | 1 | 3 | 15 | 7 |
| Women's PGA Championship | 0 | 0 | 0 | 0 | 0 | 1 | 14 | 6 |
| The Evian Championship | 0 | 0 | 0 | 0 | 0 | 1 | 5 | 4 |
| Women's British Open | 0 | 0 | 0 | 0 | 1 | 5 | 16 | 9 |
| Totals | 0 | 0 | 0 | 0 | 3 | 14 | 63 | 37 |

- Most consecutive cuts made – 6 (2010 British Open – 2013 Kraft Nabisco)
- Longest streak of top-10s – 1 (three times)

== Team appearances ==
Amateur

- European Lady Junior's Team Championship (representing France): 1996
- European Ladies' Team Championship (representing France): 1997, 1999 (winners)
- Espirito Santo Trophy (representing France): 1998, 2000 (winners)

Professional

- Solheim Cup (representing Europe): 2002, 2013 (winners), 2015, 2017
- World Cup (representing France): 2006
- The Queens (representing Europe): 2015

=== Solheim Cup record ===
| Year | Total matches | Total W–L–H | Singles W–L–H | Foursomes W–L–H | Fourballs W–L–H | Points won | Points % |
|---|---|---|---|---|---|---|---|
| Career | 14 | 7–5–2 | 1–1–2 | 3–2–0 | 3–2–0 | 8 | 57.1 |
| 2002 | 3 | 1–2–0 | 0–1–0 lost to R. Jones 3&2 | 0–0–0 | 1–1–0 lost w/ S. Gustafson 4&3 won w/ R. Carriedo-Tomas 1 up | 1 | 33.3 |
| 2013 | 4 | 2–1–1 | 0–0–1 halved with C. Kerr | 1–1–0 won w/ A. Muñoz 2&1 lost w/ A. Muñoz 1 dn | 1–0–0 won w/ B. Recari 2 up | 2.5 | 62.5 |
| 2015 | 3 | 2–1–0 | 1–0–0 def. B. Lincicome 3&2 | 0–1–0 lost w/ A. Muñoz 2&1 | 1–0–0 won w/ C. Matthew 2&1 | 2 | 66.7 |
| 2017 | 4 | 2–1–1 | 0–0–1 halved with A. Yin | 2–0–0 won w/ C. Matthew 1 up won w/ C. Matthew 2&1 | 0–1–0 lost w/ M. Sagström 2&1 | 2.5 | 62.5 |
