= ISPS Handa Ladies European Masters =

Coordinates: 51.24°N 6.78°E

Ladies European Masters
Tournament information
- Location: Düsseldorf, Germany
- Established: 2000
- Course: Golf Club Hubbelrath
- Par: 72
- Tour: Ladies European Tour
- Format: Stroke play
- Prize fund: €500,000
- Month played: September
- Final year: 2016

Final champion
- (South Korea) In-Kyung Kim
- Location in Europe Location in Germany

The ISPS Handa Ladies European Masters was a golf tournament on the Ladies European Tour held in England, and later Germany.

The tournament was first played as the Ladies British Masters at Mottram Hall in the North West of England in 2000 and 2001.

After a ten-year hiatus, it was re-established in 2012 at Buckinghamshire Golf Club near London, home to the Ladies European Tour headquarters. Held 16–18 August, it fell between the 2012 Summer Olympics and 2012 Summer Paralympics in London, 20 minutes away.

The tournament was renamed the Ladies European Masters in 2013 to signify its importance on the LET schedule, with ISPS Handa remaining the title sponsor.

== Winners ==
Year	Player	Country	Score	To par	Margin of victory	Runner(s)-up	Purse (€)	Winner's share (€)	Venue	Note
ISPS Handa Ladies European Masters
2016	In-Kyung Kim (2)	South Korea	67-70-71-63=271	−17	5 strokes	(Spain) Belén Mozo	500,000	75,000	Hubbelrath	
2015	Beth Allen	United States	71-70-68-67=276	−12	1 stroke	(Republic of Ireland) Leona Maguire (a)	500,000	75,000	Buckinghamshire	
2014	In-Kyung Kim	South Korea	71-68-63-68=270	−18	5 strokes	(Australia) Nikki Campbell	500,000	75,000	Buckinghamshire	
2013	Karrie Webb	Australia	68-67-65=200	−16	1 stroke	(South Africa) Ashleigh Simon	400,000	60,000	Buckinghamshire	
ISPS Handa Ladies British Masters
2012	Lydia Hall	Wales	66-71-72=209	−7	1 stroke	(United States) Beth Allen	£300,000	£45,000	Buckinghamshire	
2002–2011: No tournament
Kellogg's All-Bran Ladies British Masters presented by The Daily Telegraph
2001	Paula Martí	Spain	71-70-68=209	−10	1 stroke	(Spain) Raquel Carriedo	£100,000	£15,000	Mottram Hall	
The Daily Telegraph Ladies British Masters presented by Kellogg’s
2000	Trish Johnson	England	68-71-68=207	−9	2 strokes	(Norway) Vibeke Stensrud	£100,000	£15,000	Mottram Hall	
