= Biarritz Ladies Classic =

Tournament information
- Location: Biarritz, France
- Established: 2001
- Course: Biarritz le Phare GC
- Par: 70
- Tour: Ladies European Tour
- Format: 54-hole Stroke play
- Prize fund: €165,000
- Final year: 2003

Tournament record score
- Aggregate: 200 Marlene Hedblom (2003); 200 Sophie Gustafson (2002)
- To par: −10 Marlene Hedblom (2003) −10 Sophie Gustafson (2002)

Final champion
- (Sweden) Marlene Hedblom

The Biarritz Ladies Classic was a women's professional golf tournament on the Ladies European Tour that took place in Biarritz, France.

== Winners ==
Year	Dates	Venue	Winner	Country	Score	To par	Margin of victory	Runner-up	Note
2003	25–27 Sep	Biarritz le Phare GC	Marlene Hedblom	Sweden	200	−10	2 strokes	(New Zealand) Gina Scott	
2002	3–5 Oct	Biarritz le Phare GC	Sophie Gustafson	Sweden	200	−10	Playoff	(England) Mhairi McKay	
2001	27–29 Sep	Biarritz le Phare GC	Rachel Kirkwood	England	202	−8	Playoff	(England) Marina Arruti	
