= 2013 Solheim Cup =

Women's team golf competition

Coordinates: 39.476°N 104.736°W

- Dates: August 16–18, 2013
- Venue: Colorado Golf Club
- Location: Parker, Colorado, U.S.
- Captains: Meg Mallon (USA); Liselotte Neumann (Europe)
(United States)	10	18	(Europe)
- Europe wins the Solheim Cup

Location map
- Location within the United States Location within Colorado

The 2013 Solheim Cup was the 13th edition of the Solheim Cup matches, held on August 16–18 at the Colorado Golf Club in Parker, Colorado, southeast of Denver. The Solheim Cup is a biennial team competition between the top women professional golfers from the United States and from Europe. Similar to the Ryder Cup, it is a three-day match play event between teams of twelve players. Europe won the matches by a score of 18–10.

The U.S. team had won eight of the twelve previous Solheim Cups. Europe was the defending champion, having won in 2011 in Ireland, but had never won in the United States. The matches included a series of firsts for Team Europe:

- They retained the Cup for the first time since the competition began in 1990.
- This was the largest margin of victory for either team.
- They won in the United States for the first time ever.
- Sweden's Anna Nordqvist became the first player in Solheim Cup history, on either team, to make a hole-in-one.
- Sweden's Caroline Hedwall became the first player in Solheim Cup history, on either team, to win five matches in a single competition.

Europe maintained a lead after each of the five sessions and dominated the last two sessions: Saturday afternoon fourball and Sunday singles by 11 1/2 to 4 1/2 points to retain the Cup and win in the United States for the first time.

== Format ==
The Solheim Cup is a match play event, with each match worth one point. The format is as follows:

- Day 1 (Friday): Four foursome (alternate shot) matches in a morning session and four fourball (better ball) matches in an afternoon session. A total of eight players from each team participate.
- Day 2 (Saturday): Four foursome matches in a morning session and four fourball matches in an afternoon session. A total of eight players from each team participate.
- Day 3 (Sunday): 12 singles matches. All 12 players from each team participate.

With a total of 28 points, 14 1/2 points are required to win the Cup, and 14 points are required for the defending champion to retain the Cup. All matches are played to a maximum of 18 holes. If the score is even after 18 holes, each team earns one-half point.

== Team qualification and selection ==
=== Eligibility criteria ===
The United States and European teams have different eligibility criteria:

Team USA
Members of the United States team had to be current members of the LPGA Tour and be born in the United States. This was the last Solheim Cup held under these rules; beginning with the 2015 edition, eligibility was expanded to include the following categories of LPGA Tour members:

- U.S. citizens by birth, regardless of their birthplace.
- Those who were naturalized as U.S. citizens before age 18.
- Those who became U.S. citizens by adoption before age 13.

Team Europe
Members of the European team must:

1. be current members of the Ladies European Tour in any category or membership;
2. have played in six Ranking Events during the Qualifying Period as a member of the LET, unless selected as a Captain's pick (provided she is otherwise eligible);
3. must be a "European national", defined by Solheim Cup rules as someone:

Either:
(i) born in a European country; and
(ii) holding a current passport of that European country;
Or:
(i) having been naturalised as a citizen of a European country;
(ii) having held a current passport of that European country for the immediately preceding four (4) consecutive years;
(iii) having resided in that European country for the immediately preceding four (4) consecutive years.

A European country is a nation situated in the continent of Europe and is recognised as an independent state by the United Nations.

Any player who holds dual nationality (of which one shall be the nationality of a European country) shall elect on joining the LET in each of 2012 and 2013 whether she wishes to be eligible for selection for the 2013 European Solheim Cup Team.

=== Team selection ===
The United States and European teams were selected by different methods.

Team USA
Team USA qualified by earning points for wins and for top-20 finishes on the LPGA Tour over a two-year period. Points were earned beginning with the 2011 LPGA Hana Bank Championship and concluding with the 2013 Women's British Open. Points were increased in 2013 and doubled in the four major championships. The eight players with the highest points were automatically selected for Team USA. Two additional players qualified based on their position in the Rolex Women's World Golf Rankings and two were selected as wildcards by the team captain from among all eligible players.

Team Europe
Team Europe consisted of the top four players from the LET Solheim Cup standings, followed by the top four LET members on the Women's World Golf Rankings as of the conclusions 2013 Women's British Open who were not already qualified via the Solheim Cup standings, and four captain's selections. Qualifying points for Team Europe were awarded weekly to the top-10 finishers at official LET events.

== Teams ==
Meg Mallon was the captain of Team USA. She appointed Dottie Pepper and Laura Diaz as assistant captains.

Team USA
Name	Age^{1}	USA points rank	Points	Rolex ranking	Solheim experience
Meg Mallon; Non-playing captain	50				1992, 1994, 1996, 1998, 2000, 2002, 2003, 2005, 2009-assistant captain
Laura Diaz; Non-playing assistant captain	38				2002, 2003, 2005, 2007
Dottie Pepper; Non-playing assistant captain	47				1990, 1992, 1994, 1996, 1998, 2000
Stacy Lewis	28	1	977.0	2	2011
Paula Creamer	27	2	559.5	11	2005, 2007, 2009, 2011
Cristie Kerr	35	3	502.5	12	2002, 2003, 2005, 2007, 2009, 2011
Angela Stanford	35	4	421.5	16	2003, 2007, 2009, 2011
Brittany Lincicome	27	5	269.0	38	2007, 2009, 2011
Lexi Thompson	18	6	261.0	26	Rookie
Jessica Korda	20	7	247.5	28	Rookie
Brittany Lang	27	8	241.0	33	2009, 2011
Lizette Salas	24	9	222.0	19	Rookie
Morgan Pressel	25	10	218.5	41	2007, 2009, 2011
Gerina Piller; Captain's pick	28	12	174.0	57	Rookie
Michelle Wie; Captain's pick	23	13	160.5	82	2009, 2011

^{1}Age at the start of the 2013 Solheim Cup matches on August 16, 2013 (Pepper turned 48 during the matches).
Rolex rankings as of the date of team selection on August 4, 2013.

Liselotte Neumann was the captain of Team Europe. She appointed Carin Koch and Annika Sörenstam as assistant captains. Sörenstam previously served as one of two assistant captains in the 2011 Solheim Cup.

Team Europe
Name	Age^{1}	Country	LET points rank	Points	Rolex ranking	Solheim experience
Liselotte Neumann; Non-playing captain	47	Sweden				1990, 1992, 1994, 1996, 1998, 2000
Carin Koch; Non-playing assistant captain	42	Sweden				2000, 2002, 2003, 2005
Annika Sörenstam; Non-playing assistant captain	42	Sweden				1994, 1996, 1998, 2000, 2002, 2003, 2005, 2007, 2011-assistant captain
Suzann Pettersen	32	Norway	1	197.00	3	2002, 2003, 2005, 2007, 2009, 2011
Catriona Matthew	43	Scotland	2	150.75	8	1998, 2003, 2005, 2007, 2009, 2011
Carlota Ciganda	23	Spain	3	138.06	30	Rookie
Caroline Masson	24	Germany	4	125.50	58	Rookie
Beatriz Recari	26	Spain	25	39.00	20	Rookie
Anna Nordqvist	26	Sweden	7	93.24	22	2009, 2011
Karine Icher	34	France	60	8.90	24	2002
Azahara Muñoz	25	Spain	47	15.50	27	2011
Caroline Hedwall; Captain's pick	24	Sweden	6	93.24	29	2011
Jodi Ewart Shadoff; Captain's pick	25	England	13	56.66	45	Rookie
Giulia Sergas; Captain's pick	33	Italy	8	89.38	62	Rookie
Charley Hull; Captain's pick	17	England	11	74.09	147	Rookie

^{1}Age at the start of the 2013 Solheim Cup matches on August 16, 2013.
Rolex rankings as of the date of team selection on August 4, 2013.

== Course ==
Opened in 2007, the championship course of the Colorado Golf Club previously hosted the Senior PGA Championship in 2010, won by Tom Lehman. From the back tees, the course length exceeds 7,600 yards (6,950 m); its average elevation is over 6,100 feet (1,860 m) above sea level.

== Day one ==
Friday, August 16, 2013

=== Morning foursomes ===
Anna Nordqvist and Caroline Hedwall went 1 up in their match against Stacy Lewis and Lizette Salas on the 6th hole. They would retain this lead and won the first point for Europe by a 4&2 margin. Match 2 was a much tighter affair in which Suzann Pettersen and Beatriz Recari claimed a 2&1 victory over the Texan pairing of Brittany Lang and Angela Stanford. Morgan Pressel and Jessica Korda dominated their match against Catriona Matthew and Jodi Ewart Shadoff and secured the United States' first point with a 3&2 victory. Azahara Muñoz and Karine Icher were never behind in their match against Cristie Kerr and Paula Creamer and won their match by a 2&1 margin.

	Results
Nordqvist/Hedwall	(Europe) 4 & 2	Lewis/Salas
Pettersen/Recari	(Europe) 2 & 1	Lang/Stanford
Matthew/Ewart Shadoff	(United States) 3 & 2	Pressel/Korda
Muñoz/Icher	(Europe) 2 & 1	Kerr/Creamer
3	Session	1
3	Overall	1

=== Afternoon fourball ===
Caroline Hedwall and Caroline Masson were never behind in their match against Angela Stanford and Gerina Piller and won by 2&1. Though behind early on, Brittany Lincicome and Brittany Lang went 1 up on the 9th hole and retained that lead to win their match against Anna Nordqvist and Giulia Sergas by 4&3. Cristie Kerr and Michelle Wie dominated their match against Catriona Matthew and Charley Hull and won by a 2&1 margin.

The top match between Suzann Pettersen and Carlota Ciganda and Stacy Lewis and Lexi Thompson was the closest and contained a lot of controversy. While all-square on the 15th hole Ciganda hit into a water hazard but rather than put the ball back two club lengths from the hazard she was allowed to go back 40 yards due to an incorrect ruling. The controversy delayed the match for nearly 30 minutes. Ciganda hit her approach to the green and holed a 15-foot par putt. On the 16th Europe would go 1 up and would retain that lead to win the match.

	Results
Pettersen/Ciganda	(Europe) 1 up	Lewis/Thompson
Hedwall/Masson	(Europe) 2 & 1	Stanford/Piller
Nordqvist/Sergas	(United States) 4 & 3	Lincicome/Lang
Matthew/Hull	(United States) 2 & 1	Kerr/Wie
2	Session	2
5	Overall	3

== Day two ==
Saturday, August 17, 2013

=== Morning foursomes ===
Anna Nordqvist holed her tee shot at the 187 yard, par 3, 17th hole to win the first match of the day. It was the first hole-in-one in Solheim Cup history. At one point Stacy Lewis and Paula Cremer were 4 up against Azahara Muñoz and Karine Icher through 10 holes before the Europeans made the match all-square on the 14th. The match was again all-square on the 18th which was won by the United States to ensure a 1-hole victory. Brittany Lincicome and Lizette Salas were 2 up with two holes to play and lost them both to Catriona Matthew and Caroline Masson, resulting in a halved match. Michelle Wie and Brittany Lang fought back against Suzann Pettersen and Beatriz Recari to go 1 up on the 12th hole. They would close out the match by a 2&1 margin. This was the only session that the United States would win.

	Results
Nordqvist/Hedwall	(Europe) 2 & 1	Pressel/Korda
Muñoz/Icher	(United States) 1 up	Lewis/Creamer
Matthew/Masson	halved	Lincicome/Salas
Pettersen/Recari	(United States) 2 & 1	Wie/Lang
1 1/2	Session	2 1/2
6 1/2	Overall	5 1/2

=== Afternoon fourball ===
There was further controversy on Friday's fourballs matches. With the match all-square through 6 holes against Jodi Ewart Shadoff and Charley Hull, Paula Creamer faced a bogey putt on the 7th hole, which had the same line as her partner Lexi Thompson's putt for par. When drawing back one her putter, one of the European caddies conceded the putt. It transpired that assistant captain Annika Sörenstam had advised him to do so. This resulted in a 30-minute delay to assess if there should be a penalty but none was given and Thompson holed out for par. The English pairing would regain a 1 shot lead on the 17th and finish 2 up on the 18th.

Azahara Muñoz and Carlota Ciganda were all-square with Gerina Piller and Angela Stanford on the 18th where Ciganda holed a 10-foot birdie putt to win the match. Caroline Hedwall and Caroline Masson dominated their match against Michelle Wie and Jessica Korda and won the match by a 2&1 margin. There was some minor controversy in this match as Michelle Wie had run away from the 16th green after holing a putt to keep her match alive, however the Europeans were still to putt. She later apologized. Beatriz Recari and Karine Icher were never behind in their match against Cristie Kerr and Morgan Pressel all day and on the 18th hole Icher holed a 40-foot putt from off the putting surface to ensure that Europe won that match. There was considerable tension in this match. On the 16th hole both Recari and Kerr hit their tee shots into a hazard and officials needed to step in to place both balls after they could not agree on each other's ball placement. All four players would have a further argument on the 16th hole.

This resulted in Europe winning all of the fourballs matches for the first-time since 2002.

	Results
Ewart Shadoff/Hull	(Europe) 2 up	Creamer/Thompson
Muñoz/Ciganda	(Europe) 1 up	Piller/Stanford
Hedwall/Masson	(Europe) 2 & 1	Wie/Korda
Recari/Icher	(Europe) 2 up	Kerr/Pressel
4	Session	0
10 1/2	Overall	5 1/2

== Day three ==
Sunday, August 18, 2013

=== Singles ===
Europe's Charley Hull earned the first point, defeating Paula Creamer. Anna Nordqvist, in the lead-off match against Stacy Lewis, had been 2 up through the sixth hole until Lewis staged a comeback to take a one-shot lead at the 14th. Nordqvist leveled the match on the 17th and Lewis holed an eight-foot putt on the 18th hole to halve the match. Carlota Ciganda, who was never behind in her match, defeated Morgan Pressel 4&2 for Pressel's first ever defeat in a Solheim singles match. Brittany Lang dominated her match against Azhara Muñoz, winning 2&1.

The Caroline Hedwall–Michelle Wie match was all square on the 16th hole. Hedwall birdied on the 18th hole, ensuring that Europe retained the Cup. Europe clinched the win when Catriona Matthew secured the necessary half-point in her halved match with Gerina Piller. U.S. rookie Lizette Salas led Suzann Pettersen before Pettersen brought the match to all-square. Lexi Thompson led for the entire match against Caroline Masson, winning 4&3.

Jessica Korda had a one-shot lead over Giulia Sergas heading into the 18th hole, which Sergas birdied to halve the match. Jodi Ewart Shadoff went 1 up against Brittany Lincicome on the 8th hole. regained this lead on the 11th, winning 3&2. Beatriz Recari was never behind in her match against Angela Stanford and won by 2&1. The anchor match between Karine Icher and Cristie Kerr was all-square approaching the 18th hole when the pair agreed to mutually concede, ending the competition.

	Results
Anna Nordqvist	halved	Stacy Lewis
Charley Hull	(Europe) 5 & 4	Paula Creamer
Azahara Muñoz	(United States) 2 & 1	Brittany Lang
Carlota Ciganda	(Europe) 4 & 2	Morgan Pressel
Caroline Hedwall	(Europe) 1 up	Michelle Wie
Catriona Matthew	halved	Gerina Piller
Suzann Pettersen	halved	Lizette Salas
Giulia Sergas	halved	Jessica Korda
Caroline Masson	(United States) 4 & 3	Lexi Thompson
Jodi Ewart Shadoff	(Europe) 3 & 2	Brittany Lincicome
Beatriz Recari	(Europe) 2 & 1	Angela Stanford
Karine Icher	halved	Cristie Kerr
7 1/2	Session	4 1/2
18	Overall	10

== Individual player records ==
Each entry refers to the win–loss–half record of the player.

=== United States ===
Player	Points	Overall	Singles	Foursomes	Fourballs
Paula Creamer	1	1–3–0	0–1–0	1–1–0	0–1–0
Cristie Kerr	1.5	1–2–1	0–0–1	0–1–0	1–1–0
Jessica Korda	1.5	1–2–1	0–0–1	1–1–0	0–1–0
Brittany Lang	3	3–1–0	1–0–0	1–1–0	1–0–0
Stacy Lewis	1.5	1–2–1	0–0–1	1–1–0	0–1–0
Brittany Lincicome	1.5	1–1–1	0–1–0	0–0–1	1–0–0
Gerina Piller	0.5	0–2–1	0–0–1	0–0–0	0–2–0
Morgan Pressel	1	1–3–0	0–1–0	1–1–0	0–1–0
Lizette Salas	1	0–1–2	0–0–1	0–1–1	0–0–0
Angela Stanford	0	0–4–0	0–1–0	0–1–0	0–2–0
Lexi Thompson	1	1–2–0	1–0–0	0–0–0	0–2–0
Michelle Wie	2	2–2–0	0–1–0	1–0–0	1–1–0

=== Europe ===
Player	Points	Overall	Singles	Foursomes	Fourballs
Carlota Ciganda	3	3–0–0	1–0–0	0–0–0	2–0–0
Jodi Ewart Shadoff	2	2–1–0	1–0–0	0–1–0	1–0–0
Caroline Hedwall	5	5–0–0	1–0–0	2–0–0	2–0–0
Charley Hull	2	2–1–0	1–0–0	0–0–0	1–1–0
Karine Icher	2.5	2–1–1	0–0–1	1–1–0	1–0–0
Caroline Masson	2.5	2–1–1	0–1–0	0–0–1	2–0–0
Catriona Matthew	1	0–2–2	0–0–1	0–1–1	0–1–0
Azahara Muñoz	2	2–2–0	0–1–0	1–1–0	1–0–0
Anna Nordqvist	2.5	2–1–1	0–0–1	2–0–0	0–1–0
Suzann Pettersen	2.5	2–1–1	0–0–1	1–1–0	1–0–0
Beatriz Recari	3	3–1–0	1–0–0	1–1–0	1–0–0
Giulia Sergas	0.5	0–1–1	0–0–1	0–0–0	0–1–0
