= Giulia Sergas =

Italian professional golfer

Personal information
- Nationality: Italy
- Born: 26 December 1979 (age 46) Trieste, Italy
- Height: 5 ft 9 in (1.75 m)

Career
- Sport: Golf
- College: Linguistic College
- Turned professional: 1999
- Former tours: LPGA Tour; Ladies European Tour

Best results in LPGA major championships
- Chevron Championship: T7: 2013
- Women's PGA C'ship: T9: 2012
- U.S. Women's Open: T4: 2012
- Women's British Open: T5: 2004
- Evian Championship: T67: 2013

Achievements and awards
- Ladies European Tour Rookie of the Year: 2000
Medal record
Mediterranean Games
Gold medal – first place	1997 Bari	Women's team

Giulia Sergas (born 26 December 1979) is an Italian professional golfer who played on both the LPGA Tour and the Ladies European Tour.

== Early life ==
Sergas was born in Trieste in northern Italy. She took up golf at the age of nine at Golf Club Trieste under the coaching of Ezio Pavan. She attended the Linguistic College.

== Amateur career ==
In 1996 and again in 1998, Sergas was a member of the runner-up World Amateur Team Championship (Espirito Santo Trophy) teams. In 1998 she won the European Ladies Amateur Championship. She finished as lead amateur in the 1999 Women's British Open where she tied for 24th place.

== Professional career ==
Sergas turned professional on 22 October 1999 and played initially on the Ladies European Tour. In her rookie season in 2000 she earned the Bill Johnson Rookie of the Year award as the leading rookie on the LET Order of Merit. She qualified for the LPGA Tour in 2002. Her best finish on the LPGA Tour is a tied for second at the 2004 ShopRite LPGA Classic. Her best finishes on the Ladies European Tour are second at the 2011 Sicilian Ladies Italian Open and tied for second at the 2011 New Zealand Women's Open. She also finished tied for second at the unofficial 2009 European Nations Cup.

After the conclusion of the 2013 Women's British Open, she was chosen by Liselotte Neumann as one of her four captain's selections to the 2013 European Solheim Cup Team for the matches to be held in Colorado. She helped lead Team Europe to a 18–10 win. It was the Europeans' first successful defense of the Cup, and also the first win for Team Europe on American soil.

Sergas represented Italy at the women's golf tournament at the 2016 Summer Olympics in Rio de Janeiro, Brazil.

== Personal life ==
Sergas currently lives in Palm Springs, California.

== Amateur wins ==
- 1998 European Ladies Amateur Championship

== Results in LPGA majors ==
Results not in chronological order before 2015.

Tournament	2002	2003	2004	2005	2006	2007	2008	2009	2010	2011	2012	2013	2014	2015	2016
ANA Inspiration				T55			T38	T48	T56	CUT		T7	T29	CUT	
Women's PGA Championship		T43	T49		CUT	T36	T10	CUT	73	CUT	T9	T44	CUT		WD
U.S. Women's Open		T35				CUT	T6	T52	CUT		T4	CUT	T49		
Women's British Open	T47	CUT	T5	CUT	CUT	CUT		T11	T73		CUT	CUT	T21		
The Evian Championship ^												T67	CUT		

^ The Evian Championship was added as a major in 2013

Top 10
Did not play

CUT = missed the half-way cut
WD = withdrew
"T" = tied

=== Summary ===
Tournament	Wins	2nd	3rd	Top-5	Top-10	Top-25	Events	Cuts made
ANA Inspiration	0	0	0	0	1	1	8	6
Women's PGA Championship	0	0	0	0	2	2	12	7
U.S. Women's Open	0	0	0	1	2	2	8	5
Women's British Open	0	0	0	1	1	3	11	5
The Evian Championship	0	0	0	0	0	0	2	1
Totals	0	0	0	2	6	8	41	24

- Most consecutive cuts made – 4 (twice)
- Longest streak of top-10s – 2 (twice)

== Team appearances ==
Amateur

- European Ladies' Team Championship (representing Italy): 1997, 1999
- Junior Ryder Cup (representing Europe): 1997
- Espirito Santo Trophy (representing Italy): 1996, 1998

Professional

- World Cup (representing Italy): 2005, 2007
- Solheim Cup (representing Europe): 2013 (winners)

=== Solheim Cup record ===
Year	Total matches	Total W–L–H	Singles W–L–H	Foursomes W–L–H	Fourballs W–L–H	Points won	Points %
Career	2	0–1–1	0–0–1	0–0–0	0–1–0	0.5	25.0
2013	2	0–1–1	0–0–1 halved w/ J. Korda	0–0–0	0–1–0 lost w/ A. Nordqvist 4&3	0.5	25.0
