= 2001 Ladies European Tour =

Golf tournament series

2001 Ladies European Tour season
- Duration: March 2001 – September 2001
- Number of official events: 16
- Order of Merit: (Spain) Raquel Carriedo
- Player of the Year: (Spain) Raquel Carriedo
- Rookie of the Year: (Norway) Suzann Pettersen
- Lowest stroke average: (Scotland) Catriona Matthew

The 2001 Ladies European Tour was a series of golf tournaments for elite female golfers from around the world, which took place from March through September 2001. The tournaments were sanctioned by the Ladies European Tour (LET).

== Tournaments ==
The table below shows the 2001 schedule. The numbers in brackets after the winners' names show the number of career wins they had on the Ladies European Tour up to and including that event. This is only shown for members of the tour.

Date	Name	Venue	Location	Winner	Notes
4 Mar	ANZ Ladies Masters	The Royal Pines Golf Club	Australia	(Australia) Karrie Webb (4)	Co-sanctioned by the ALPG Tour
11 Mar	AAMI Women's Australian Open	Yarra Yarra Golf Club	Australia	(Sweden) Sophie Gustafson (7)	Co-sanctioned by the ALPG Tour
17 Mar	Taiwan Ladies Open	Ta Shee Golf & Country Club	Taiwan	(Spain) Raquel Carriedo (1)	
25 Mar	Nedbank Mastercard South African Masters	Gary Player Country Club	South Africa	(England) Samantha Head (2)	
20 May	La Perla Ladies Italian Open	Poggio dei Medici	Italy	(Spain) Paula Martí (1)	
10 Jun	Ladies French Open	Le Golf d'Arras	France	(Norway) Suzann Pettersen (1)	
16 Jun	**Evian Masters**	Evian Masters Golf Club	France	(Australia) Rachel Teske (3)	
8 Jul	Kellogg's All-Bran Ladies British Masters	Mottram Hall	England	(Spain) Paula Martí (2)	
29 Jul	WPGA Championship of Europe	Royal Porthcawl Golf Club	Wales	(Sweden) Helen Alfredsson (10)	
5 Aug	**Weetabix Women's British Open**	Sunningdale Golf Club	England	(South Korea) Se Ri Pak (n/a)	Co-sanctioned by the LPGA Tour
12 Aug	Compaq Open	Österåker Golf Club	Sweden	(Spain) Raquel Carriedo (2)	
19 Aug	Palmerston Ladies German Open	Palmerston Golf Resort Sporting Club Berlin	Germany	(France) Karine Icher (1)	
26 Aug	Waterford Crystal Ladies' Irish Open	Faithlegg Golf Club	Ireland	(Spain) Raquel Carriedo (3)	
2 Sep	Mexx Sport Open	Kennemer Golf & Country Club	Netherlands	(France) Karine Icher (2)	
9 Sep	WPGA International Matchplay	Gleneagles, PGA Centenary Course	Scotland	(England) Laura Davies (33)	
29 Sep	Biarritz Ladies Classic	Biarritz Le Phare	France	(England) Rachel Kirkwood (1)	

Major championships in bold.

== Order of Merit rankings ==
Rank	Player	Country	Points
1	Raquel Carriedo	Spain	10,661.23
2	Suzann Pettersen	Norway	8,014.30
3	Karine Icher	France	6,927.98
4	Marine Monnet	France	6,590.54
5	Sophie Gustafson	Sweden	5,916.57
6	Paula Martí	Spain	5,459.66
7	Elisabeth Esterl	Germany	4,836.25
8	Iben Tinning	Denmark	3,887.92
9	Marina Arruti	Italy	3,509.49
10	Becky Morgan	Wales	3,194.90

== See also ==
- 2001 LPGA Tour
