= Colorado Golf Club =

Golf club in Parker, Colorado, US

- Location in the United States
- 39.476°N 104.736°W

Club information
- Location: Parker, Colorado
- Established: 2007
- Type: Private
- Total holes: 18
- Tournaments: Senior PGA Championship - 2010; Solheim Cup - 2013
- Designed by: Bill Coore & Ben Crenshaw
- Par: 72
- Length: 7,604 yards (6,953 m)
- Course rating: 75.5
- Slope rating: 149

Colorado Golf Club is a golf club located in Parker, Colorado, southeast of Denver. Opened in 2007, it hosted the Senior PGA Championship in 2010, won by Tom Lehman. It also hosted the Solheim Cup in 2013, a biennial ladies team competition contested by teams from the United States and Europe.

The championship golf course was designed by Bill Coore and Ben Crenshaw, and plays 7,604 yards (6,953 m) off the back tees to a par of 72. Its average elevation exceeds 6,100 feet (1,860 m) above sea level.

Colorado Golf Club
Tee	Rating/Slope	1	2	3	4	5	6	7	8	9	Out	10	11	12	13	14	15	16	17	18	In	Total
Championship	75.5 / 149	653	154	428	500	479	251	583	311	483	3842	463	214	531	405	329	595	552	209	464	3762	7604
Black	75.1 / 148	630	150	423	471	466	219	558	305	463	3685	444	193	508	391	311	569	532	200	431	3579	7264
Blue	72.4 / 139	615	125	403	433	457	205	538	274	431	3481	425	173	481	370	293	552	520	177	420	3411	6892
White	69.2 / 128	536	120	386	372	387	175	516	268	424	3184	390	158	361	299	237	535	491	139	385	2995	6179
SI	Men's	9	17	11	1	5	15	7	13	3		10	14	2	12	16	4	8	18	6
Par		5	3	4	4	4	3	5	4	4	36	4	3	4	4	4	5	5	3	4	36	72
Red	69.6 / 122	504	84	276	328	358	170	443	175	314	2652	337	133	323	273	187	374	407	83	340	2457	5109
SI	Ladies'	3	17	9	5	11	15	1	7	13		10	16	8	12	14	4	2	18	6
