= Marlene Hedblom =

Swedish professional golfer

Personal information
- Full name: Maria Marlene Hedblom
- Nationality: Sweden
- Born: 13 November 1972 (age 53) Gävle, Sweden
- Life partner: Christer Lindholm
- Children: 2

Career
- Sport: Golf
- Turned professional: 1998
- Former tours: Ladies European Tour (1998–2007); LPGA Tour (2004)
- Professional wins: 2

Number of wins by tour
- Ladies European Tour: 1
- Other: 1

Best results in LPGA major championships
- Chevron Championship: DNP
- Women's PGA C'ship: CUT: 2004
- U.S. Women's Open: DNP
- du Maurier Classic: DNP
- Women's British Open: T21: 2001

Marlene Hedblom (born 13 November 1972 in Gävle) is a retired Swedish professional golfer.

== Early years ==
Despite coming from a golfing family, she did not start playing until the age of 12 at Gävle Golf Club in Sweden. Her father Olle was an elite player, who later became a club professional and her two years elder brother Peter turned tournament professional at 19 years old.

In 1995, together with his father, she won the very first Swedish Two Generations Mixed Championship, played as foursome.

== Professional career ==
She won the 1997 Ladies European Tour Final Qualifying School at La Manga, Spain, 5–8 December and turned professional.

Hedblom had her most successful season in 2003 when she won the Biarritz Ladies Classic at Biarritz le Phare Golf Club in France in the last tournament on the Ladies European Tour season, with his father as a caddie. Her win meant that she and her brother Peter became the only brother and sister siblings, who have won on the European Tour and Ladies European Tour respectively.

The same year, she qualified for the LPGA Tour at the LPGA Final Qualifying Tournament held at LPGA International Legends Course in Florida. Her best 2004 finish on the LPGA Tour was tied 46th at the Franklin American Mortgage Championship at the Vanderbilt Legends Club, Iron Horse Course in Franklin, Tennessee.

== Personal life ==
Since her retirement in 2007, Hedblom has worked as a speaker and a club professional at Arlandastad Golf, Bro Hof Slott Golf Club and Fågelbro Golf & Country Club, all in the Stockholm area in Sweden, where she lives.

Hedblom was in a relationship with singer-songwriter Patrik Isaksson. Since the end of 2018, she had a relationship with former road racing driver Christer Lindholm.

== Professional wins (2) ==
=== Ladies European Tour (1) ===
No.	Date	Tournament	Winning score	Margin of victory	Runner-up
1	27 Sep 2003	Biarritz Ladies Classic	−10 (66-69-65=200)	2 strokes	(New Zealand) Gina Scott

=== Other (1) ===
- 2008 Gefle Open
