= Nicole Perrot =

Chilean professional golfer (born 1983)

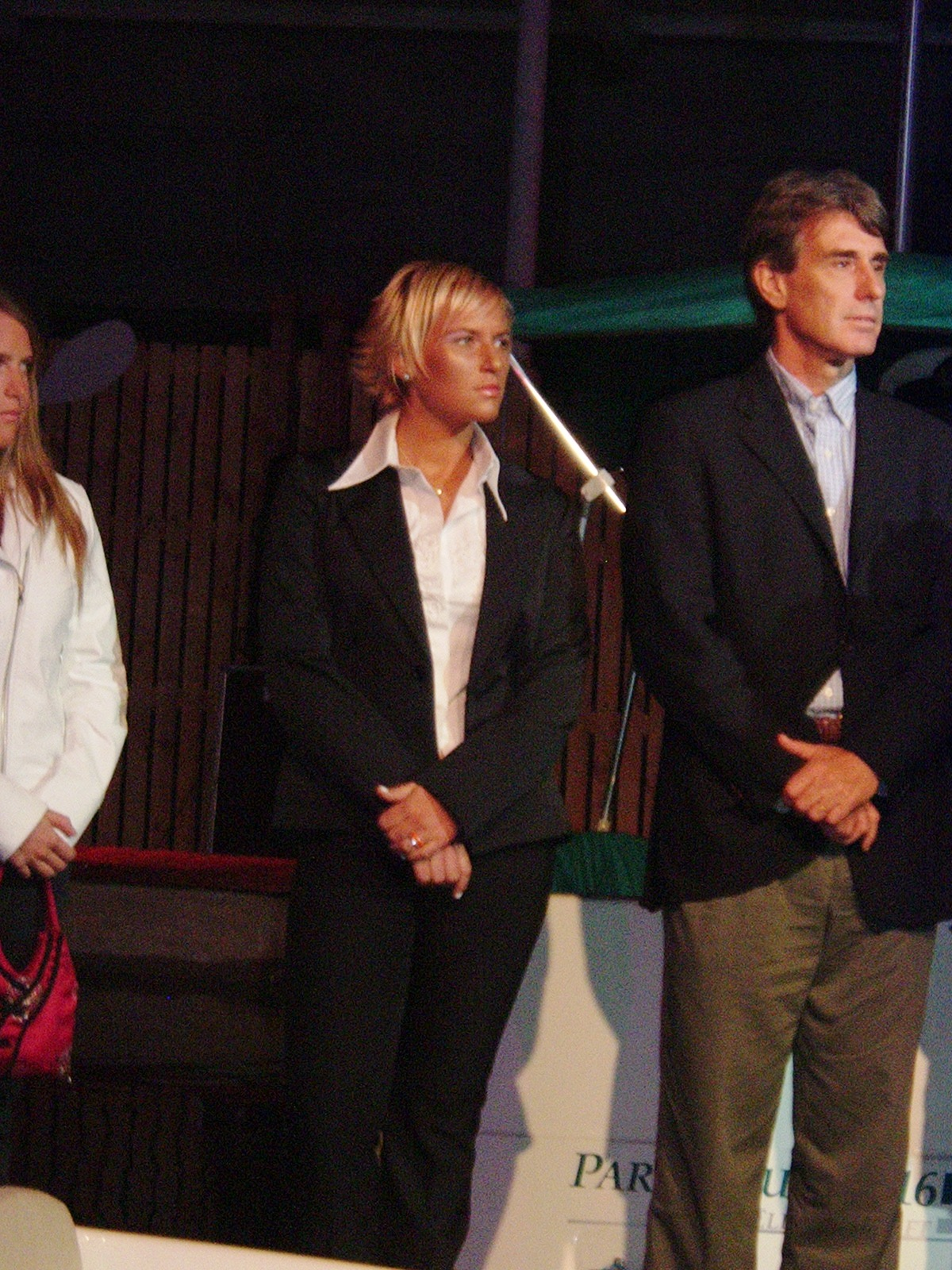

Personal information
- Nationality: Chile
- Born: 26 December 1983 (age 42) Viña del Mar, Chile
- Height: 5 ft 5 in (1.65 m)

Career
- Sport: Golf
- Turned professional: 2002
- Former tours: LPGA Tour (2003, 2005–2008); Futures Tour (joined 2002)
- Professional wins: 3

Number of wins by tour
- LPGA Tour: 1
- Epson Tour: 2

Best results in LPGA major championships
- Chevron Championship: T60: 2007
- Women's PGA C'ship: T39: 2006
- U.S. Women's Open: T23: 2005
- Women's British Open: T22: 2005

Nicole Perrot (born 26 December 1983) is a Chilean professional golfer. She is the first Chilean-born player to win on the LPGA Tour.

== Career ==
In 1983, Perrot was born in Viña del Mar, Chile. She won the 2001 U.S. Girls' Junior and was runner-up at the U.S. Women's Amateur that same year.

In 2002, she turned professional. She started her professional career on the LPGA's second tier Futures Tour. In 2004, she won two events on that tour and qualified to play on the main LPGA Tour in 2005 by finishing third on the money list. She won her first LPGA Tour event at the 2005 Longs Drugs Challenge.

In 2006 her best finish was a tie for 19th at the Fields Open in Hawaii. Hampered by a back injury in 2007, she played only eight events between February and early June.

== Professional wins (3) ==
=== LPGA Tour wins (1) ===
No.	Date	Tournament	Winning score	Margin of victory	Runner-up
1	9 Oct 2005	Longs Drugs Challenge	−14 (69-66-64-71=270)	1 stroke	(South Korea) Hee-Won Han

=== Futures Tour wins (2) ===
- 2002 (2) The Albany Futures Golf Classic, GMAC Futures Golf Classic

== Results in LPGA majors ==
Tournament	2002	2003	2004	2005	2006	2007	2008
Kraft Nabisco Championship	CUT			CUT	65	T60	WD
LPGA Championship				T54	T39		CUT
U.S. Women's Open	CUT		CUT	T23	CUT		
Women's British Open				T22	CUT		

Did not play

CUT = missed the half-way cut
WD = withdrew
"T" = tied
