= Buckinghamshire Golf Club =

Golf club near Denham, Buckinghamshire, England

Coordinates: 51°34′19″N 0°29′21″W

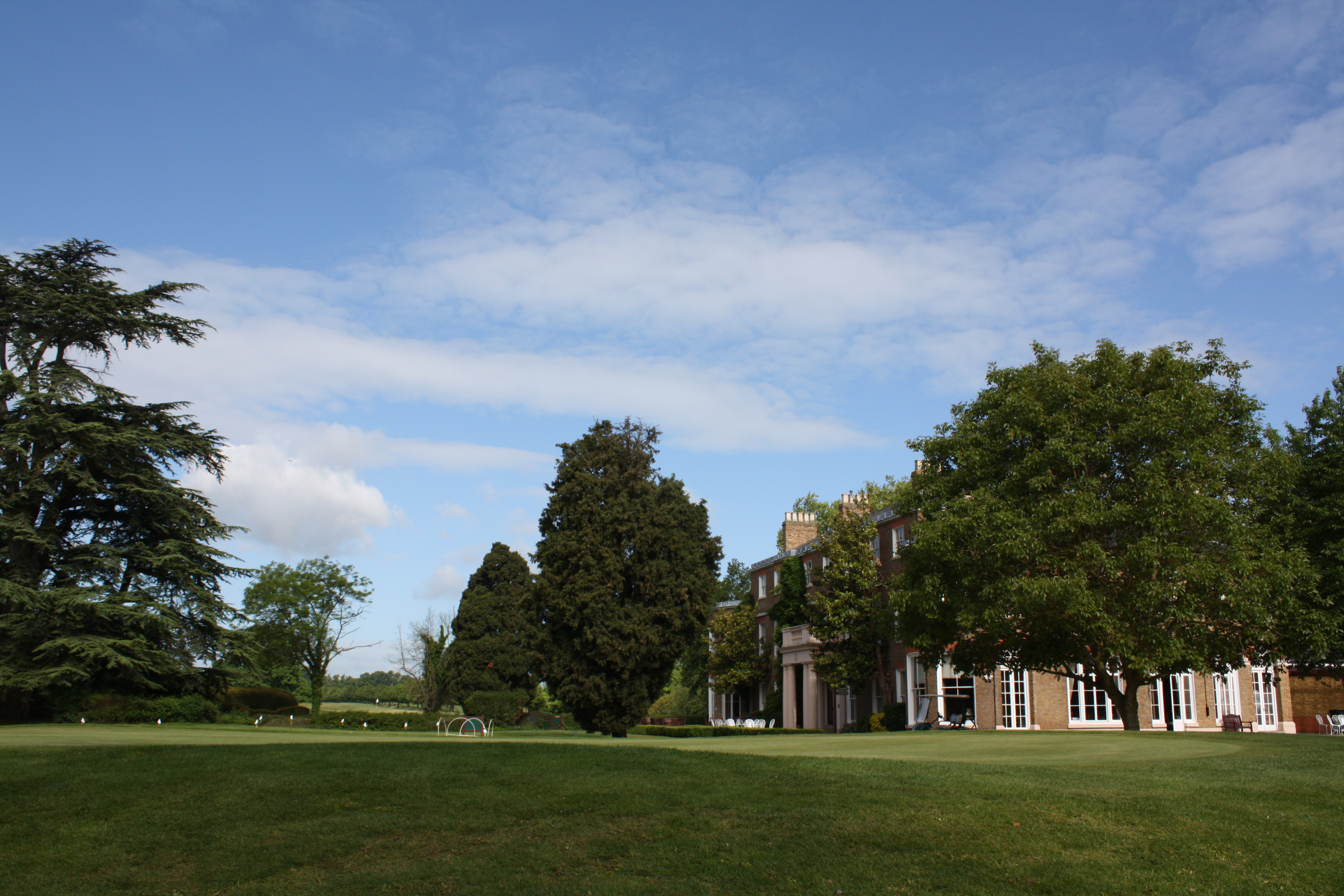
Buckinghamshire Golf Club

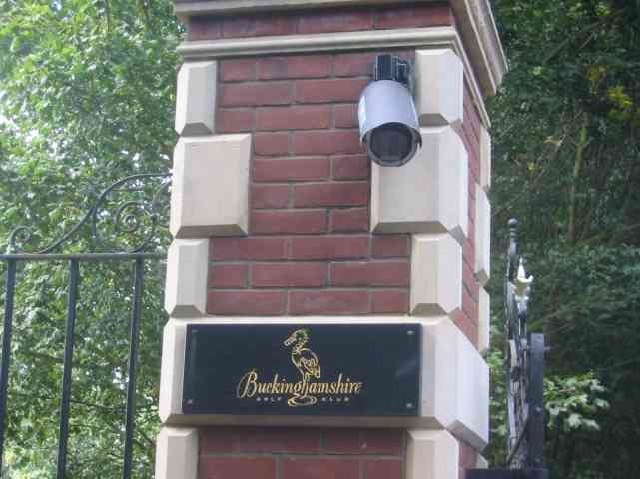
Buckinghamshire Golf Club sign

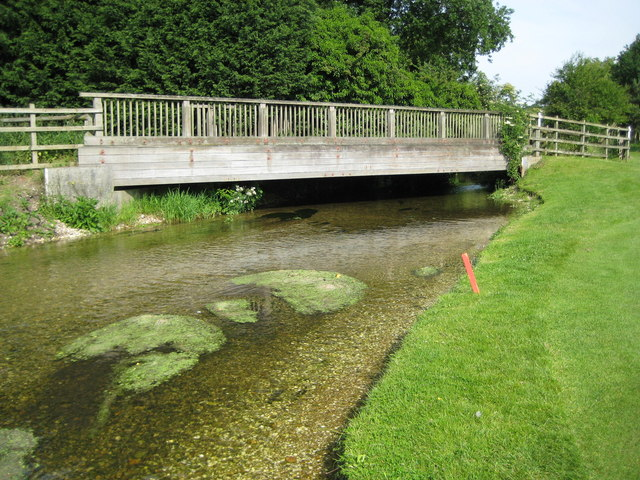
River Misbourne running through the course

Buckinghamshire Golf Club, containing the Denham Court Mansion, is a golf club near Denham, Buckinghamshire, England, United Kingdom.

It is accessed via Denham Country Drive off the M40 motorway near the junction with the M25 motorway. The golf course and surroundings form part of the Denham Country Park, an area which the poet John Dryden called "one of the most delicious spots in England". The mansion is set in a course of 226 acres, designed by the former Ryder Cup captain John Jacobs. The golf club was established in 1992. The River Misbourne flows through the course.

The club hosted the Senior Tournament of Champions on the European Seniors Tour from 1996 to 2000, the Andersen Consulting World Championship of Golf European Final in 1997, which was won by Colin Montgomerie, and the ISPS Handa Ladies European Masters on the Ladies European Tour since 2012.

== The course ==
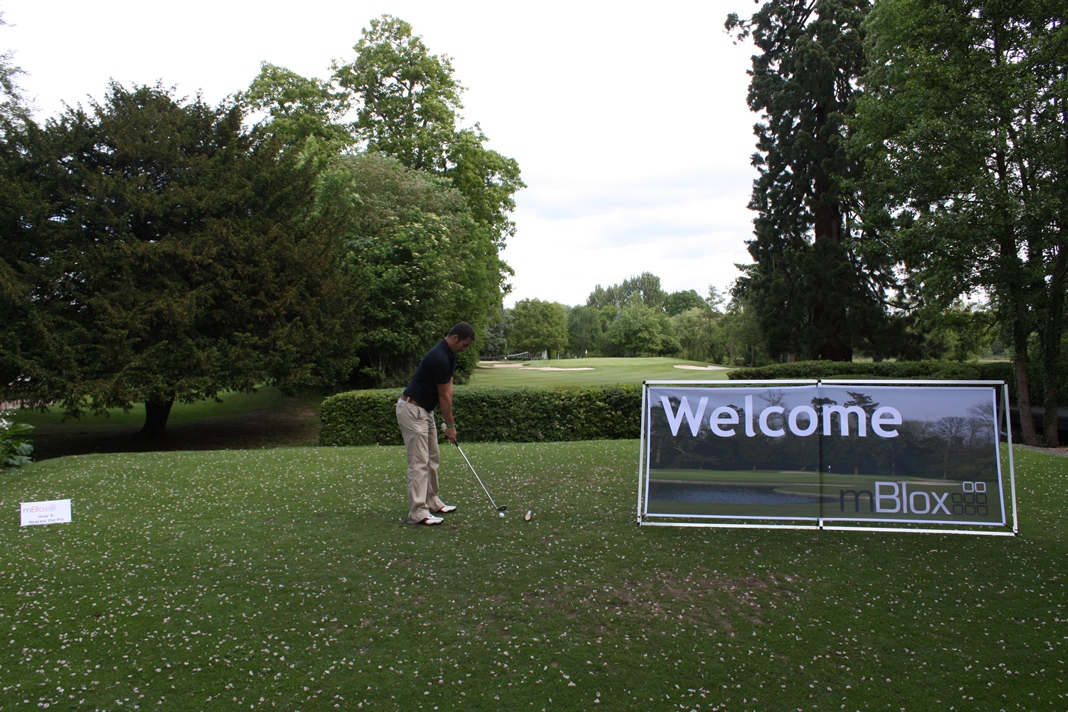
The 9th

A large golf course, it is longer in total than 6800 yards. The 18 holes are as follows:

1. Par 5 - 505 yards
2. Par 4 - 375 yards
3. Par 3 - 212 yards
4. Par 4 - 447 yards
5. Par 5 - 482 yards
6. Par 4 - 354 yards
7. Par 4 - 413 yards
8. Par 4 - 363 yards
9. Par 3 - 165 yards
10. Par 4 - 430 yards
11. Par 5 - 504 yards
12. Par 4 - 429 yards
13. Par 4 - 448 yards
14. Par 3 - 178 yards
15. Par 4 - 382 yards
16. Par 3 - 190 yards
17. Par 4 - 470 yards
18. Par 5 - 533 yards

The course was reversed in 2024 as part of a major refurb, with the 10th becoming the 1st and original 1st, the 10th.

== Denham Court Mansion ==
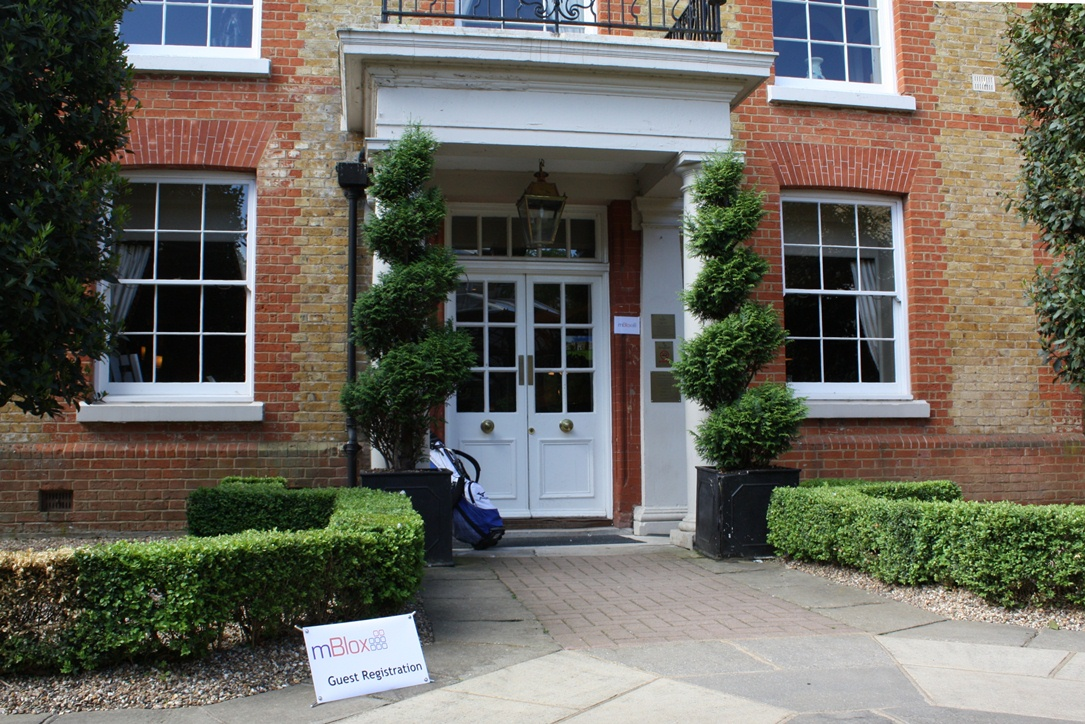
Denham Court Mansion entrance

The club house, Denham Court Mansion has its origins in Anglo-Saxon times. The current version was largely built in the 18th century, although an area of the building is over 700 years old. Denham Court Mansion is a Grade II listed manor house. It contains the Heron Restaurant and is a venue for wedding receptions.
