= Beatriz Recari =

Spanish professional golfer (born 1987)

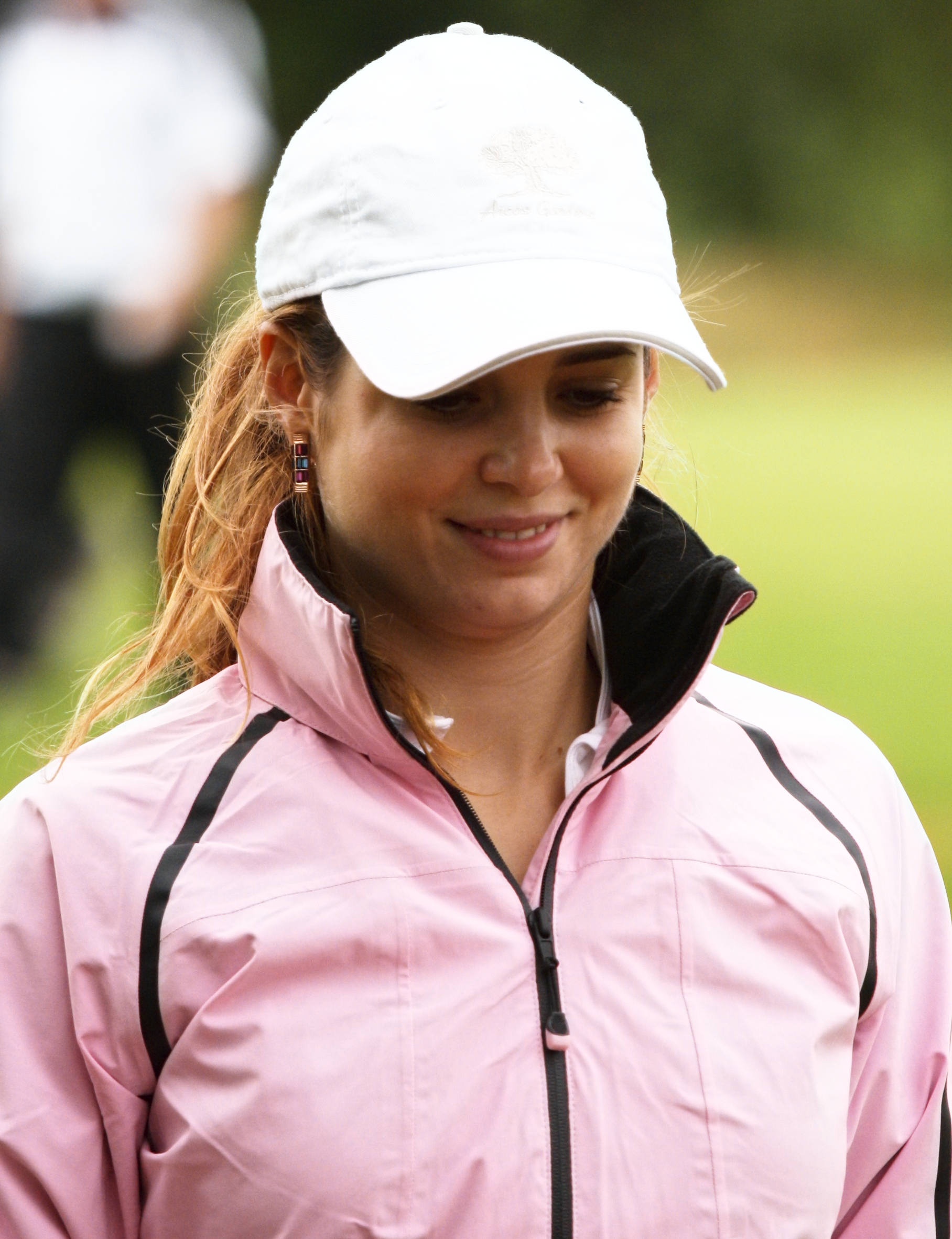
- Recari in July 2009

Personal information
- Full name: Beatriz Recari Eransus
- Nationality: Spain
- Born: 21 April 1987 (age 39) Pamplona, Spain
- Height: 1.63 m (5 ft 4 in)

Career
- Sport: Golf
- College: University of Navarra (one year)
- Turned professional: 2005
- Former tours: Ladies European Tour; LPGA Tour
- Professional wins: 4

Number of wins by tour
- LPGA Tour: 3
- Ladies European Tour: 1

Best results in LPGA major championships
- Chevron Championship: T20: 2018
- Women's PGA C'ship: T19: 2013
- U.S. Women's Open: T27: 2011
- Women's British Open: T14: 2016
- Evian Championship: T9: 2013

Beatriz Recari Eransus (born 21 April 1987) is a Spanish professional golfer who played on the U.S.-based LPGA Tour and the Ladies European Tour.

== Early life and amateur career ==
In 1987, Eransus was born in Pamplona, Spain. She was raised in the country. Recari began playing golf at age 11.

She enjoyed a successful amateur career. In 2003, she finished runner-up at the Girls Amateur Championship. She won at the 2004 Spanish Amateur Championship. She won the European Lady Junior's Team Championship as a member of Team Spain in 2004 and was a member of Team Europe in the 2005 Junior Solheim Cup. She also won the 2005 French Amateur Championship.

Recari briefly studied economics at the University of Navarra in Pamplona.

== Professional career ==
=== Ladies European Tour ===
In 2005, Recari qualified for the Ladies European Tour. She turned professional at age 18 for the 2006 LET season. She balanced professional golf with school in the spring of 2006, but after the completion of her first academic year, she concentrated on her golf career.

Recari won her first tournament as a pro in her fourth LET season at the 2009 Finnair Masters at Helsinki, Finland, where she holed out for an eagle two from 161 m (176 yd) on the first playoff hole to win € 30,000. Her best season to date as a professional, she finished 22nd on the 2009 LET Order of Merit (money list), with earnings of €68,889.

At the LPGA Final Qualifying Tournament at Daytona Beach, Florida in December 2009, Recari finished tenth to earn her LPGA Tour card for the 2010 season. She ended 2009 ranked 175th in the Women's World Golf Rankings.

=== LPGA Tour ===
In 2010, during her first year on the LPGA Tour, Recari had made only three of thirteen cuts through September, and had missed the last five cuts. With under $43,000 in earnings, a return to the Qualifying Tournament appeared imminent, but a successful autumn run allowed her to finish with over $265,000, 39th on the money list. In October, Recari won her first LPGA event at the CVS/pharmacy LPGA Challenge in northern California and made the cut in her final five events to finish runner-up to compatriot Azahara Muñoz for 2010 LPGA Rookie of the Year honors. Recari ended the year at 56th in the world rankings.

Starting in all 23 events of the year with a best finish of tied for eleventh at the ShopRite LPGA Classic, Recari earned $223,053, which put her No. 43 on the money list. Recari ended the year ranked 72nd in the world rankings.

Recari played and made the cut in all of the 27 LPGA official events in 2012. Her streak of consecutive starts and cuts made earned her the nickname "Iron Woman". Recari earned $444,620 with five top-ten finishes, which ranked her 32nd on the money list. Her best finish throughout the year was a tied for sixth at the Navistar LPGA Classic. Recari ended 2012 ranked 59th in the world rankings.

== Personal life ==
Recari struggled with eating disorder in her early professional years. She went public with her struggle at the 2011 RR Donnelley LPGA Founders Cup when she donated her winnings to The Alliance for Eating Disorders Awareness. She was subsequently named the "Ambassador" of The Alliance for Eating Disorders Awareness in 2013.

Recari began dating Andreas Thorp, her caddie, in 2008. Their relationship ended in 2018.

== Professional wins (4) ==
=== LPGA Tour wins (3) ===
No.	Date	Tournament	Winning score	To par	Margin of victory	Runner-up	Winner's share ($)
1	17 Oct 2010	CVS/pharmacy LPGA Challenge	68-66-70-70=274	–14	1 stroke	(France) Gwladys Nocera	165,000
2	24 Mar 2013	Kia Classic	69-67-69-74=279	–9	Playoff	(South Korea) I.K. Kim	255,000
3	21 Jul 2013	Marathon Classic	69-65-67-66=267	–17	1 stroke	(United States) Paula Creamer	195,000

LPGA Tour playoff record (1–0)

No.	Year	Tournament	Opponent(s)	Result
1	2013	Kia Classic	(South Korea) I.K. Kim	Won with birdie on second extra hole

=== Ladies European Tour wins (1) ===
No.	Date	Tournament	Winning score	To par	Margin of victory	Runner-up	Winner's share (€)
1	29 Aug 2009	Finnair Masters	65-64-73=202	–11	Playoff^{1}	(Denmark) Iben Tinning	30,000

^{1}Holed out from the fairway for eagle on the first extra hole.

== Results in LPGA majors ==
Results not in chronological order before 2019.

Tournament	2007	2008	2009	2010	2011	2012	2013	2014	2015	2016	2017	2018	2019
ANA Inspiration					CUT	T26	T25	CUT	CUT	T50	CUT	T20	73
U.S. Women's Open					T27	T35	CUT	T46	CUT	T55	WD		
Women's PGA Championship				CUT	T50	T45	T19	T40	CUT	T22	CUT	CUT	
The Evian Championship ^							T9	T36	CUT	CUT	CUT	CUT	
Women's British Open	CUT		CUT	CUT	CUT	T26	CUT	T17	CUT	T14			

^ The Evian Championship was added as a major in 2013

Top 10
Did not play

CUT = missed the half-way cut
WD = withdrew
"T" = tied

=== Summary ===
Tournament	Wins	2nd	3rd	Top-5	Top-10	Top-25	Events	Cuts made
ANA Inspiration	0	0	0	0	0	2	9	5
U.S. Women's Open	0	0	0	0	0	0	7	4
Women's PGA Championship	0	0	0	0	0	2	9	5
The Evian Championship	0	0	0	0	1	1	6	2
Women's British Open	0	0	0	0	0	2	9	3
Totals	0	0	0	0	1	7	40	19

- Most consecutive cuts made – 6 (2012 Kraft Nabisco – 2013 LPGA)
- Longest streak of top-10s – 1

== LPGA Tour career summary ==
Year	Tournaments played	Cuts made	Wins	2nd	3rd	Top 10s	Best finish	Earnings ($)	Money list rank	Scoring average	Scoring rank
2010	18	8	1	0	0	5	1	265,466	39	72.57	56
2011	23	19	0	0	0	0	T11	223,053	43	72.58	44
2012	27	27	0	0	0	5	T6	444,620	32	71.69	29
2013	25	21	2	0	1	9	1	1,030,614	8	70.87	17
2014	27	18	0	0	0	1	T8	309,058	53	72.19	66
2015	25	13	0	0	0	1	T5	167,890	75	72.85	98
2016	29	23	0	0	0	2	T4	386,260	49	71.65	53
2017	24	13	0	0	0	1	T5	197,765	77	71.94	91
2018	22	12	0	0	0	2	T6	156,089	87	71.92	76
2019	10	4	0	0	0	0	T29	15,838	158	72.70	133
2020	5	1	0	0	0	0	T70	2,549	174	75.00	n/a
2021	Did not play										
2022	1	0	0	0	0	0	CUT	0	n/a	77.00	n/a

- official through 2022 season

== LET career summary ==
Year	Tournaments played	Cuts made	Wins	2nd	3rd	Top 10s	Best finish	Earnings (€)	Order of Merit
2006	15	12	0	0	0	0	T20	24,990	73
2007	17	10	0	0	0	0	T11	22,513	82
2008	15	10	0	0	1	2	T3	37,252	59
2009	14	11	1	0	0	1	1	68,889	22

== World ranking ==
Position in Women's World Golf Rankings at the end of each calendar year.

Year	World ranking	Source
2006	485	
2007	439	
2008	456	
2009	175	
2010	56	
2011	72	
2012	59	
2013	19	
2014	61	
2015	143	
2016	96	
2017	119	
2018	171	
2019	293	
2020	404	
2021	768	

== Team appearances ==
Amateur

- European Lady Junior's Team Championship (representing Spain): 2004 (winners)
- Espirito Santo Trophy (representing Spain): 2004
- Junior Solheim Cup (representing Europe): 2005

Professional

- Solheim Cup (representing Europe): 2013 (winners)
- International Crown (representing Spain): 2014 (winners)

=== Solheim Cup record ===
Year	Total matches	Total W–L–H	Singles W–L–H	Foursomes W–L–H	Fourballs W–L–H	Points won	Points %
Career	4	3–1–0	1–0–0	1–1–0	1–0–0	3	75.0
2013	4	3–1–0	1–0–0 def. A. Stanford 2&1	1–1–0 won w/ S. Pettersen 2&1, lost w/ S. Pettersen 2&1	1–0–0 won w/ K. Icher 2 up	3	75.0
