= Raquel Carriedo-Tomás =

Spanish professional golfer

Personal information
- Nationality: Spain
- Born: 8 February 1971 (age 55) Zaragoza, Spain
- Height: 5 ft 4 in (1.63 m)
- Children: 2

Career
- Sport: Golf
- Turned professional: 1995
- Former tours: Ladies European Tour; LPGA Tour (2003)
- Professional wins: 5

Number of wins by tour
- Ladies European Tour: 4
- Other: 1

Best results in LPGA major championships
- Chevron Championship: T42: 2003
- Women's PGA C'ship: WD: 2003
- U.S. Women's Open: 4th: 2002
- du Maurier Classic: DNP
- Women's British Open: T12: 2001

Achievements and awards
- Ladies European Tour Order of Merit: 2001
- Ladies European Tour Player of the Year: 2001

Raquel Carriedo-Tomás (born 8 February 1971) is a Spanish professional golfer, usually called just Raquel Carriedo.

In 2000, she became the first Spaniard to play for Europe in the Solheim Cup. Carriedo was also a member of the team in 2002, and she topped the Ladies European Tour Order of Merit in 2001.

== Early life and amateur career ==
At six years of age, Carriedo started playing golf at Real Club de Golf La Peñaza in Zaragoza, Aragon, 300 kilometers north-east of the Spanish capital Madrid. Her professional instructor was Vicente Ballesteros, elder brother of major winner Seve Ballesteros. She practiced and competed a lot at a young age and when she was 16, her instructor told her parents that she should try a professional career in golf, but she did not turn pro until she had finished her studies in tourism eight years later.

During her amateur career, she never won a national amateur title nor represented her country at international team championships.

== Professional career ==
With a solid 2000 season on the Ladies European Tour, despite not winning a tournament, Carriedo was selected, as the sixth of seven automatic qualifiers and the first ever Spanish participant to the European team against the United States at the 2000 Solheim Cup at Loch Lomond Golf Club, Scotland. Carriedo contributed to a European 14^{1}/_{2} to 11^{1}/_{2} points win with a tie in the second day fourball match with Laura Davies against Meg Mallon and Beth Daniel.

Carriedo finished the 2000 Ladies European Tour season fifth on the Order of Merit.

After finishing second nine times, Carriedo captured her first professional win in March 2001 at the Taiwan Ladies Open.

At the Compaq Open in August 2001 at Österåker Golf Club outside Stockholm, Sweden, Carriedo was six strokes behind leader Karine Icher after 36 holes and three strokes behind after 54 holes. However, on the 11th hole during the final round, Icher was penalised one stroke due to slow play and continued to four-putt the hole. Carriedo finally won by a stroke and continued the 2001 season winning the Ladies European Tour Order of Merit.

At the 2002 U.S. Women's Open at Prairie Dunes Country Club in Hutchinson, Kansas, Carriedo reached her best finish in a major championship, finishing lone fourth behind Juli Inkster, Annika Sörenstam and Shani Waugh.

Carriedo made her second Solheim Cup appearance in September 2002, as the second automatic European qualifier, at Interlachen Country Club, Minnesota, U.S.A. In the second day fourball Carriedo came to be paired with her opponent from the Compaq Open the year before, Karine Icher. The pair won their game against Cristie Kerr and Rosie Jones, but Europe lost the match 15^{1}/_{2} to 12^{1}/_{2}.

Carriedo mainly retired from competitive golf after the 2004 season and after having two children, she has been working as a golf instructor.

== Awards and honors ==
- In 2001, she won the Order of Merit on the Ladies European Tour and also earned Player of the Year honors.
- Due to this success, in 2001 the Royal Spanish Golf Federation bestowed upon her the Medal of the Royal Order of Merit and the Gold Medal of Merit.

== Professional wins (5) ==
=== Ladies European Tour wins (4) ===
| No. | Date | Tournament | Winning score | To par | Margin of victory | Runner(s)-up |
|---|---|---|---|---|---|---|
| 1 | 18 Mar 2001 | Taiwan Ladies Open | 69-67-75=211 | −5 | 1 stroke | (Sweden) Anna Berg (Germany) Elisabeth Esterl |
| 2 | 12 Aug 2001 | Compaq Open | 72-67-73-72=284 | −8 | 1 stroke | (France) Karine Icher |
| 3 | 26 Aug 2001 | Waterford Crystal Ladies' Irish Open | 68-66-66=200 | −16 | 1 stroke | (Sweden) Sophie Gustafson |
| 4 | 5 May 2002 | Tenerife Ladies Open | 73-71-77-71=292 | +4 | 1 stroke | (England) Johanna Head |

Ladies European Tour playoff record (0–2)

| No. | Year | Tournament | Opponents | Result |
|---|---|---|---|---|
| 1 | 1999 | Donegal Irish Ladies Open | (England) Laura Davies (Germany) Elisabeth Esterl (France) Sandrine Mendiburu | Mendiburu won with par on second extra hole. Esterl was eliminated with bogey on first extra hole. |
| 2 | 2001 | La Perla Ladies Italian Open | (Spain) Paula Martí | Martí won with par on the first playoff hole |

=== Women's European Satellite Tour wins (1) ===
| No. | Date | Tournament | Winning score | To par | Margin of victory | Runner-up |
|---|---|---|---|---|---|---|
| 1 | 13 Nov 2011 | Villaitana WEST Final^{1} | 67-69-69=205 | −11 | 1 stroke | (Spain) Adriana Zwanck |

^{1} Co-sanctioned by the Banesto Golf Tour

== Team appearances ==
Professional

- Solheim Cup (representing Europe): 2000 (winners), 2002

=== Solheim Cup record ===
| Year | Total matches | Total W–L–H | Singles W–L–H | Foursomes W–L–H | Fourballs W–L–H | Points won | Points % |
|---|---|---|---|---|---|---|---|
| Career | 5 | 1–3–1 | 0–2–0 | 0–1–0 | 1–0–1 | 11.5 | 33,3% |
| 2000 | 2 | 0–1–1 | 0–1–0 lost B. Iverson 3&2 | 0–0–0 | 0–0–1 halved w/ L. Davies | 0.5 | 25% |
| 2002 | 3 | 1–2–0 | 0–1–0 lost J. Inkster 4&3 | 0–1–0 lost w/ I. Tinning 1 hole | 1–0–0 won w/ K. Icher 1 hole | 1 | 33,3% |
