= WPGA International Matchplay =

Tournament information
- Location: Auchterarder, Perthshire, Scotland
- Established: 2001
- Course(s): PGA Centenary course, Gleneagles
- Par: 72
- Tour(s): Ladies European Tour
- Format: Match play
- Prize fund: £400,000
- Month played: September
- Final year: 2001

Final champion
- (England) Laura Davies

The WPGA International Matchplay was a professional golf tournament in Scotland on the Ladies European Tour.

The match play event was held at the par-72 PGA Centenary course at Gleneagles in early September and played only in 2001.

A crowd of 10,000 spectators turned out in gale-force winds to see Laura Davies put in a solid performance to beat local favorite Janice Moodie 5 and 4 to claim her second win of the year and take the £110,000 first prize. Davies' semi-final saw an element of controversy surrounding her match against top seed Sophie Gustafson. The pair were tied after 18 holes but the Swede lost out at the first extra hole after having halved it, as her American caddie, Chuck Hoersch, infringed the course rules. He was caught catching a lift in a buggy on a return from a toilet break, and Gustafson was left in tears with loss of the match. Moodie also toppled a Swedish opponent in the semi-finals as she completed a 2 and 1 victory, featuring eight birdies, over her Solheim Cup teammate Carin Koch. Gustafson recovered from the morning's disappointment to claim third place with a 4 and 3 win over Koch.

From some player's point of view, a highlight of the week was the snooker competition organized to raise money for the charity Eyes for Europe. Laurette Maritz organised the event which was won by Trish Johnson and Scottish professional snooker player Stephen Hendry.

== Winners ==
Year	Winner	Country	Winning score	Runner-up	Purse (£)	Winner's share (£)
6–9 Sep 2001	Laura Davies	England	5 & 4	(Scotland) Janice Moodie	400,000	110,000
