= 2013 Evian Championship =

Coordinates: 46.394°N 6.570°E

Tournament information
- Dates: 12–15 September 2013
- Location: Évian-les-Bains, France
- Course(s): Evian Resort Golf Club
- Tour(s): Ladies European Tour; LPGA Tour

Statistics
- Par: 71
- Length: 6,428 yards (5,878 m)
- Field: 120 players, 77 after cut
- Cut: 146 (+4)
- Prize fund: $3,250,000 €2,496,170
- Winner's share: $487,500 €366,393

Champion
- (Norway) Suzann Pettersen
- 203 (−10)

Location in France

The 2013 Evian Championship was played 12–15 September at the Evian Resort Golf Club in Évian-les-Bains, France. It was the 20th Evian Championship (the first 19 played as the Evian Masters), and the first as a major championship on the LPGA Tour. The inaugural event was televised by Golf Channel and NBC Sports in the United States and Sky Sports in the United Kingdom.

Heavy rain before and during the first day of the tournament forced Thursday's played to be suspended and the scores abandoned. The initial plan was to play the first and second rounds on Friday and Saturday and play the final 36 holes on Sunday. The prediction of more heavy rain on Sunday and several following days forced tournament officials to shorten the event to 54 holes.

Suzann Pettersen won by two strokes over amateur Lydia Ko.

== Field ==
The field for the tournament was set at 120, and most earned exemptions based on past performance on the Ladies European Tour, the LPGA Tour, or with a high ranking in the Women's World Golf Rankings.

There were seven exemption categories for the 2013 Evian Championship.

1. The top 40 in the Women's World Golf Rankings.
2. Active Evian Masters Champions.
3. 2013 LPGA Tour winners.
4. 2013 Ladies European Tour (LET) winners.
5. The top 5 on the LET Order of Merit.
6. Evian invitations (six).
7. Remainder of players from the LPGA Tour money list.

== Course ==
Hole	1	2	3	4	5	6	7	8	9	Out	10	11	12	13	14	15	16	17	18	In	Total
Par	4	3	4	4	3	4	5	3	5	35	4	4	4	5	3	5	3	4	4	36	71
Yards	395	165	343	414	179	377	529	189	475	3,066	406	353	428	499	221	527	155	331	442	3,362	6,428
Metres	361	151	314	379	164	345	484	173	434	2,805	371	323	391	456	202	482	142	303	404	3,074	5,879

== Round summaries ==
=== First round ===
Thursday, 12 September 2013
Friday, 13 September 2013

Thursday's play began after a two-hour rain delay. Play was suspended after less than an hour due to continuing rain. The scores were annulled and play resumed on Friday. The course had received almost 4 inches (10 cm) of rain since the previous Saturday. The first round was played on Friday with Mika Miyazato of Japan shooting a 6-under-par 65 to take a one stroke lead over Sandra Gal, Se Ri Pak, and Suzann Pettersen.

Place	Player	Score	To par
1	(Japan) Mika Miyazato	65	−6
T2	(Germany) Sandra Gal	66	−5
T2	(South Korea) Se Ri Pak	66	−5
T2	(Norway) Suzann Pettersen	66	−5
5	(United States) Christina Kim	67	−4
T6	(New Zealand) Lydia Ko (a)	68	−3
T6	(Australia) Karrie Webb	68	−3
T6	(United States) Michelle Wie	68	−3
T6	(Australia) Lindsey Wright	68	−3
T10	(United States) Danah Bordner	69	−2
T10	(South Korea) Na Yeon Choi	69	−2
T10	(South Korea) Hee-Won Han	69	−2
T10	(South Korea) I.K. Kim	69	−2
T10	(United States) Stacy Lewis	69	−2
T10	(South Korea) Ji-Young Oh	69	−2
T10	(South Africa) Lee-Anne Pace	69	−2
T10	(Spain) Beatriz Recari	69	−2
T10	(United States) Angela Stanford	69	−2
T10	(Japan) Ayako Uehara	69	−2

=== Second round ===
Saturday, 14 September 2013

Mika Miyazato shot a 2-under-par 69 to maintain a one-shot lead over Suzann Pettersen and amateur Lydia Ko. The cut was at 146 (+4) and 77 players made the cut.

Place	Player	Score	To par
1	(Japan) Mika Miyazato	65-69=134	−8
T2	(New Zealand) Lydia Ko (a)	68-67=135	−7
T2	(Norway) Suzann Pettersen	66-69=135	−7
4	(United States) Stacy Lewis	69-67=136	−6
T5	(South Korea) Chella Choi	70-67=137	−5
T5	(South Korea) Se Ri Pak	66-71=137	−5
T5	(South Korea) So Yeon Ryu	71-66=137	−5
T8	(South Korea) I.K. Kim	69-69=138	−4
T8	(Spain) Beatriz Recari	69-69=138	−4
T8	(Australia) Lindsey Wright	68-70=138	−4

=== Final round ===
Sunday, 15 September 2013

The event was reduced to 54 holes due to heavy rain.

Place	Player	Score	To par	Money ($)
1	(Norway) Suzann Pettersen	66-69-68=203	−10	487,500
2	(New Zealand) Lydia Ko (a)	68-67-70=205	−8	0
3	(United States) Lexi Thompson	72-67-68=207	−6	297,994
T4	(South Korea) Se Ri Pak	66-71-71=208	−5	191,700
T4	(South Korea) So Yeon Ryu	71-66-71=208	−5	191,700
T6	(South Korea) Chella Choi	70-67-72=209	−4	112,302
T6	(United States) Stacy Lewis	69-67-73=209	−4	112,302
T6	(United States) Angela Stanford	69-71-69=209	−4	112,302
T9	(United States) Jennifer Johnson	70-70-70=210	−3	76,681
T9	(Spain) Beatriz Recari	69-69-72=210	−3	76,681

(a) = amateur

==== Scorecard ====
Final round

Hole	1	2	3	4	5	6	7	8	9	10	11	12	13	14	15	16	17	18
Par	4	3	4	4	3	4	5	3	5	4	4	4	5	3	5	3	4	4
(Norway) Pettersen	−7	−8	−9	−9	−9	−9	−8	−9	−9	−9	−9	−9	−9	−9	−10	−10	−10	−10
(New Zealand) Ko	−8	−7	−8	−8	−8	−8	−8	−8	−8	−8	−8	−8	−7	−7	−8	−8	−8	−8
(United States) Thompson	−3	−4	−5	−6	−5	−5	−5	−5	−6	−6	−6	−5	−5	−5	−5	−6	−6	−6
(South Korea) Pak	−5	−4	−4	−4	−4	−3	−3	−3	−3	−3	−4	−4	−4	−4	−5	−4	−5	−5
(South Korea) Ryu	−5	−5	−6	−6	−6	−6	−6	−6	−7	−7	−6	−6	−7	−7	−7	−7	−6	−5
(United States) Lewis	−7	−7	−7	−7	−8	−7	−7	−5	−5	−5	−5	−5	−5	−4	−4	−5	−5	−4
(Japan) Miyazato	−7	−7	−6	−6	−5	−5	−2	−2	−3	−4	−4	−4	−4	−3	−3	−1	−1	−1

Cumulative tournament scores, relative to par

Birdie	Bogey	Double bogey	Triple bogey+
