= CVS/pharmacy LPGA Challenge =

Golf tournament formerly on the LPGA Tour

Tournament information
- Location: Danville, California, U.S.
- Established: 1996
- Course: Blackhawk Country Club
- Par: 72
- Length: 6,185 yards (5,656 m)
- Tour: LPGA Tour
- Format: Stroke play - 72 holes
- Prize fund: $1,100,000
- Month played: October
- Final year: 2010

Tournament record score
- Aggregate: 268 Sophie Gustafson (2009)
- To par: -20 Sophie Gustafson (2009)

Final champion
- (Spain) Beatriz Recari

The CVS/pharmacy LPGA Challenges was a 72-hole golf tournament for professional female golfers that was part of the LPGA Tour from 1996 through 2010. It was played at various sites in Northern California and was managed by the Bruno Event Team. In 2006 the tournament moved to its last location at the Blackhawk Country Club in Danville.

In 1996 the tournament was known as the Twelve Bridges LPGA Classic. Between 1997 and 2008 the title sponsor was Longs Drugs, a drugstore chain headquartered in Walnut Creek and the tournament was known as the Longs Drugs Challenge. In October 2008, CVS/pharmacy completed its purchase of the Longs chain and took over the sponsorship of the tournament, renamed the CVS/pharmacy LPGA Challenge for 2009. CVS sponsored the tournament for two years before dropping its support; the final year was 2010.

Tournament names through the years:

- 1996: Twelve Bridges LPGA Classic
- 1997–2008: Longs Drugs Challenge
- 2009–2010: CVS/pharmacy LPGA Challenge

== Winners ==
Year	Dates	Champion	Country	Score	To par	Venue	Purse ($)	Winner's share	Ref
2010	Oct 14–17	Beatriz Recari	Spain	274	−14	Blackhawk Country Club	1,100,000	165,000	
2009	Sep 24–27	Sophie Gustafson	Sweden	268	−20	Blackhawk Country Club	1,100,000	165,000	
2008	Oct 9–12	In-Kyung Kim	South Korea	278	−10	Blackhawk Country Club	1,200,000	180,000	
2007	Oct 4–7	Suzann Pettersen	Norway	277	−11	Blackhawk Country Club	1,100,000	160,000	
2006	Sep 21–24	Karrie Webb	Australia	273	−15	Blackhawk Country Club	1,100,000	160,000	
2005	Oct 6–9	Nicole Perrot	Chile	270	−14	The Ridge Golf Club	1,000,000	150,000	
2004	Sep 23–26	Christina Kim	United States	266	−18	The Ridge Golf Club	1,000,000	150,000	
2003	Oct 2–5	Helen Alfredsson	Sweden	275	−13	Lincoln Hills Club	1,000,000	150,000	
2002	Apr 18–21	Cristie Kerr	United States	280	−8	Twelve Bridges Club	900,000	135,000	
2001	Apr 19–22	Se Ri Pak	South Korea	208^{1}	−8	Twelve Bridges Club	800,000	120,000	
2000	Apr 13–16	Juli Inkster (2)	United States	275	−13	Twelve Bridges Club	700,000	105,000	
1999	Apr 1–4	Juli Inkster	United States	280	−8	Twelve Bridges Club	600,000	90,000	
1998	Apr 1–5	Donna Andrews	United States	278	−10	Twelve Bridges Club	600,000	90,000	
1997	Apr 3–6	Annika Sörenstam	Sweden	285	−3	Twelve Bridges Club	500,000	75,000	
1996	Apr 4–7	Kelly Robbins	United States	273	−11	Twelve Bridges Club	500,000	75,000	

^{1} Shortened to 54 holes due to rain.

== Tournament record ==
Year	Player	Score	Round	Course
2003	Se Ri Pak	64 (−8)	2nd round	Lincoln Hills Club, par 72
2004	Anna Acker-Macoscko	60 (−11)	4th round	The Ridge Golf Club, par 71
2010	Brittany Lincicome	61 (−11)	1st round	Blackhawk Country Club, par 72
