= Paula Martí =

Spanish professional golfer (born 1980)

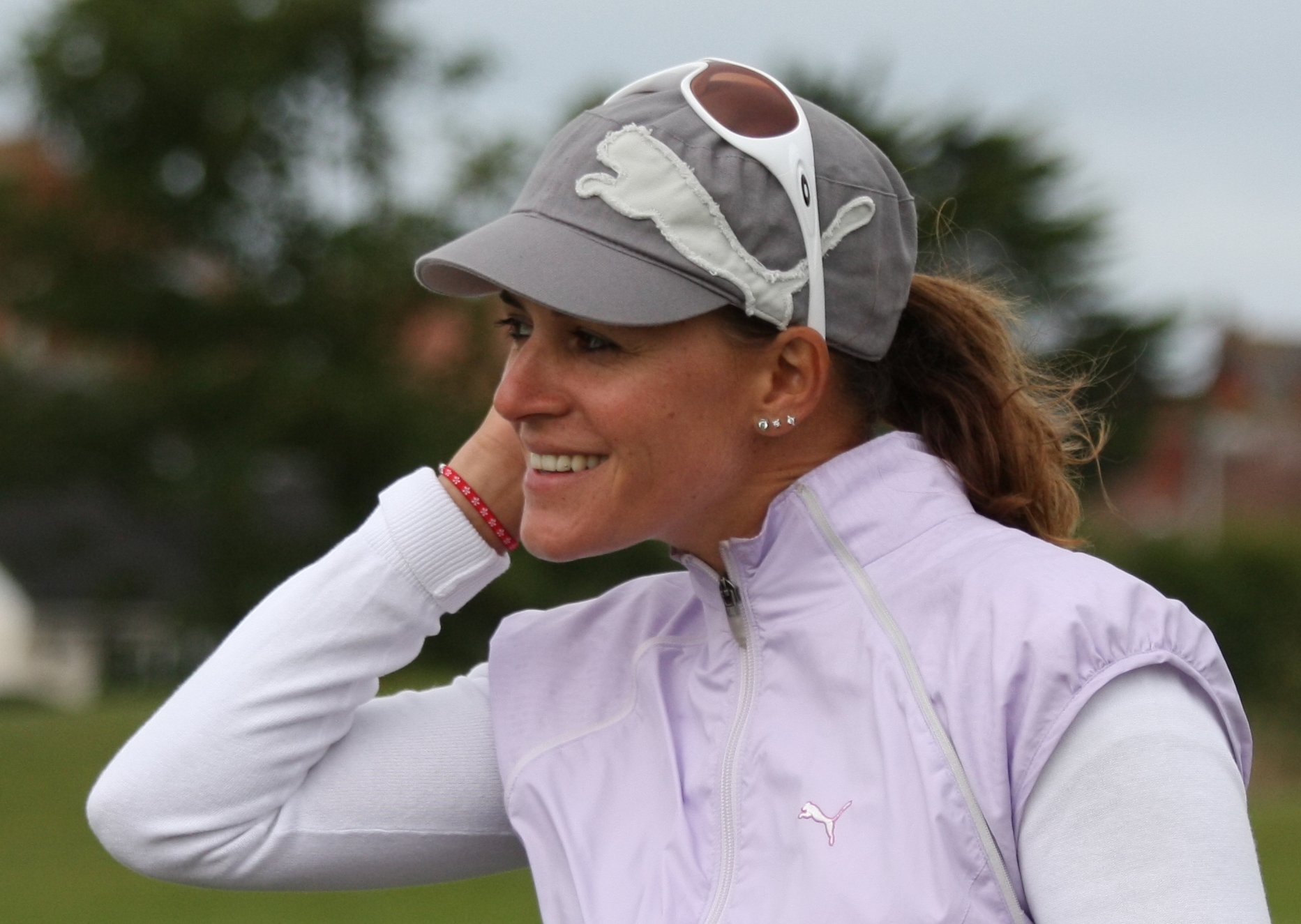
- Martí at the 2009 Women's British Open

Personal information
- Full name: Paula Martí Zambrano
- Nationality: Spain
- Born: 29 January 1980 (age 46) Barcelona, Catalonia, Spain
- Height: 5 ft 8 in (1.73 m)
- Life partner: Ivan Corretja
- Children: 2

Career
- Sport: Golf
- College: University of Florida
- Turned professional: 2000
- Current tours: LPGA Tour (2003–2005); Ladies European Tour (joined 2001)
- Professional wins: 3

Number of wins by tour
- Ladies European Tour: 2
- WPGA Tour of Australasia: 1

Best results in LPGA major championships
- Chevron Championship: CUT: 2003
- Women's PGA C'ship: T42: 2005
- U.S. Women's Open: T26: 2003
- Women's British Open: T2: 2002

Achievements and awards
- Ladies European Tour Order of Merit: 2002

Paula Martí Zambrano (born 29 January 1980) is a professional golfer from Spain. She used to be a member of the LPGA Tour and now plays the Ladies European Tour.

== Amateur career ==
Martí was born in Barcelona, Catalonia, Spain. As an amateur, she was National Spanish Champion in 1996 and a member of the European Junior Ryder Cup teams of 1995 and 1997. She moved to the United States in 1998, and graduated from Saddlebrook Prep School and the Arnold Palmer Golf Academy. She was 1998 AJGA All-American.

Martí attended the University of Florida in Gainesville, Florida, United States, where she played for the Florida Gators women's golf team in 2000 and was recognized as a second-team All-Southeastern Conference (SEC) selection. She turned professional in 2000, starting her professional career on the Ladies European Tour in 2001.

== Professional career ==
She had two victories in her rookie season, winning the Ladies Italian Open in her fourth professional event and less than two months later the Ladies British Masters.

In 2002 Martí won the EDUCOM ALPG Players' Championship in Australia on the ALPG Tour, came tied second at the British Women's Open at Turnberry and topped the money list on the 2002 Ladies European Tour. She was a member of the 2002 European Solheim Cup Team and was awarded the Spanish Royal Order of Merit for Sports in the bronze category.

At the end of 2002, she tied for 31st at the LPGA Final Qualifying Tournament to earn non-exempt status for the 2003 LPGA season. During 2003–2005 her best LPGA Tour finish was a tie for sixth at the Franklin American Mortgage Championship. She teamed with Ana Belen Sánchez to represent Spain at the inaugural Women's World Cup of Golf in 2005 and teamed with Marta Prieto in the 2006 Women's World Cup of Golf. She did not play on the LPGA in 2006 due to the birth to her first child, son Izan Corretja.

Martí returned to the LET in 2007. She finished tied 3rd at the MFS Women's Australian Open Championship, her first event of the season. She posted seven top ten finishes in seventeen 2007 starts however was not selected for the 2007 Solheim Cup team.

Martí finished second at the 2007 Deutsche Bank Ladies Swiss Open, losing to Bettina Hauert at the fourth extra hole of a play-off. In 2008, she posted ten top ten finishes, including three runner-up spots, ending the year ranked 8th on the tour's money list.

She had a second son with partner Ivan Corretja, a boy named Jan, on 22 November 2010.

== Amateur wins ==
- 1995 Spanish Girls Under 18 Championship
- 1996 Spanish Girls Under 18 Championship, Spanish National Closed Championship, Spanish National Junior Championship
- 1997 Spanish Girls Under 18 Championship
- 1998 Rolex Tournament of Champions

== Professional wins (3) ==
=== Ladies European Tour (2) ===
| No. | Date | Tournament | Winning score | To par | Margin of victory | Runner(s)-up |
|---|---|---|---|---|---|---|
| 1 | 2001 | La Perla Ladies Italian Open | 70-73-72-68=283 | −9 | Playoff (Note: Marti won with a par at the first playoff hole.) | (Spain) Raquel Carriedo |
| 2 | 2001 | Kellogg's All-Bran Ladies British Masters | 71-70-68=209 | −10 | 1 stroke | (Spain) Raquel Carriedo |

Ladies European Tour playoff record (1–2)

| No. | Year | Tournament | Opponent(s) | Result |
|---|---|---|---|---|
| 1 | 2001 | La Perla Ladies Italian Open | (Spain) Raquel Carriedo | Martí won with par on the first playoff hole |
| 2 | 2007 | Deutsche Bank Ladies Swiss Open | (Germany) Bettina Hauert (Australia) Anna Rawson | Hauert won with birdie on the fourth extra hole. Rawson was eliminated with par on the second extra hole. |
| 3 | 2009 | HypoVereinsbank Ladies German Open | (France) Jade Schaeffer | Martí lost at the first playoff hole |

=== ALPG Tour (1) ===
- 2002 EDUCOM ALPG Players' Championship

== Team appearances ==
Amateur

- European Girls' Team Championship (representing Spain): 1997 (winners)
- Junior Ryder Cup (representing Europe): 1997

Professional

- Solheim Cup (representing Europe): 2002
- World Cup (representing Spain): 2005, 2006, 2008

=== Solheim Cup record ===
| Year | Total matches | Total W–L–H | Singles W–L–H | Foursomes W–L–H | Fourballs W–L–H | Points won | Points % |
|---|---|---|---|---|---|---|---|
| Career | 3 | 1–3–0 | 0–1–0 | 1–1–0 | 0–1–0 | 1 | 25% |
| 2002 | 3 | 1–3–0 | 0–1–0 lost to Laura Diaz 5&3 | 1–1–0 lost w/ L. Davies 2&1 to M. Mallon/J. Inkster won w/ L. Davies 2 up against J. Inkster/L. Diaz | 0–1–0 lost w/ L. Davies 1 dn against R. Jones/C. Kerr | 1 | 25% |

== See also ==
- List of Florida Gators women's golfers on the LPGA Tour
