= Mhairi McKay =

Scottish golfer (born 1975)

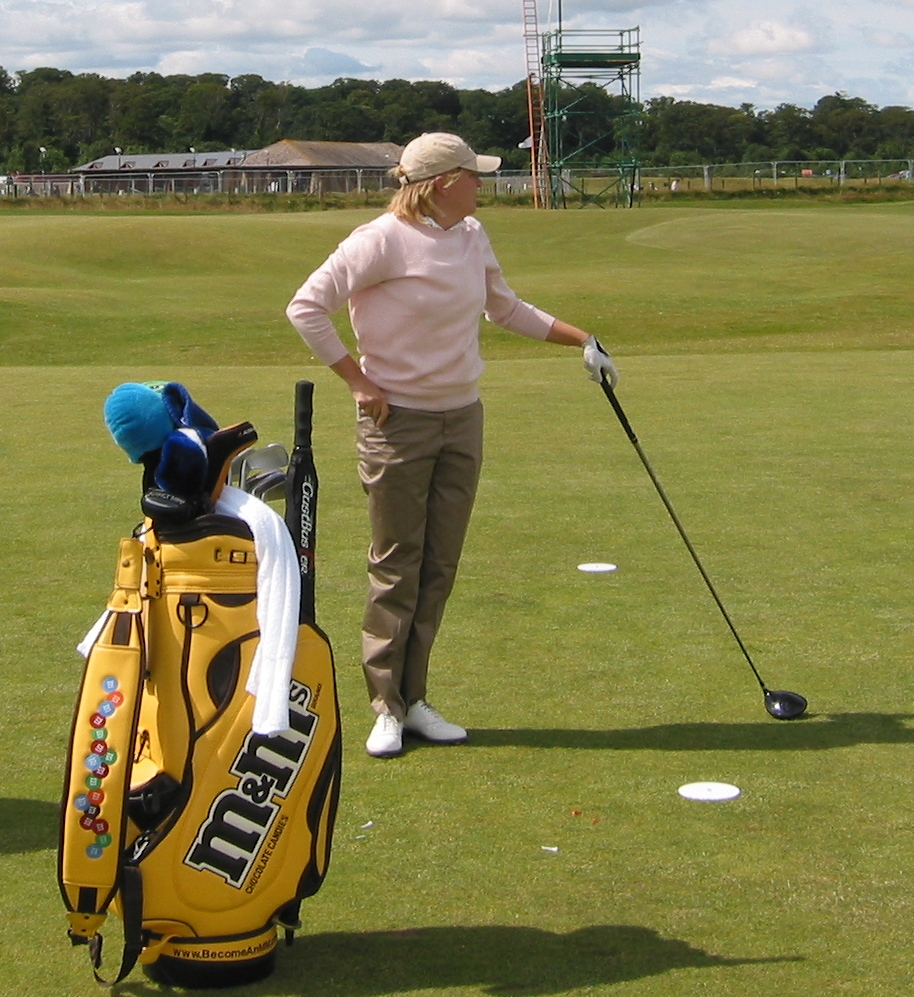

Personal information
- Nationality: Scotland
- Born: 18 April 1975 (age 51) Glasgow, Scotland
- Height: 5 ft 6 in (1.68 m)

Career
- Sport: Golf
- College: Stanford University
- Turned professional: 1997
- Former tours: Ladies European Tour (1998–2008); LPGA Tour (1998–2011)
- Professional wins: 1

Number of wins by tour
- WPGA Tour of Australasia: 1

Best results in LPGA major championships
- Chevron Championship: T19: 2002
- Women's PGA C'ship: T13: 2004
- U.S. Women's Open: 6th/T6: 2002, 2003
- du Maurier Classic: T13: 2000
- Women's British Open: T11: 2007

Mhairi McKay (born 18 April 1975) is a Scottish professional golfer who played mainly on the U.S.-based LPGA Tour and was also a member of the Ladies European Tour.

== Amateur career ==
McKay was born in Glasgow. She is a former pupil of Fernhill School and was introduced to golf by her parents. They moved from Glasgow to Girvan, close to the famous Turnberry golf links where she learned to play and is still a club member. She had a successful amateur career and was the Golf Foundation Under 13 girls’ champion in 1987 and Under 14 champion in 1988. She also won the Daily Telegraph Junior Golf Championship in 1991 and won the Girls Amateur Championship in 1992 and 1993. She represented Great Britain & Ireland in the Curtis Cup matches of 1994 and 1996 and played in the 1996 Espirito Santo Trophy World Amateur Team Championship.

McKay was the first international female player to be offered a golf scholarship at Stanford University in California where she was a classmate of Tiger Woods (she took a Portuguese literature class with him). She graduated in 1997 with a B.A. in Public Policy having been Pac-10 champion in 1997, Pac-10 All Conference from 1994 to 1997) and Pac-10 All Academic 1st Team in 1997. She also earned All-American honours from 1994 through to 1997.

== Professional career ==
McKay turned professional after graduating from college and qualified for the LPGA Tour on her first attempt, finishing joint 56th at LPGA Final Qualifying Tournament earning non-exempt status for the 1998 LPGA season.

She was an LPGA Tour rookie in 1998. She has yet to win on the LPGA Tour, but she had second-place finishes in 2001, 2002 and 2003 and claimed her first professional win in 2003 at the AAMI Women's Australian Open. She represented Europe in the Solheim Cup in 2002 and 2003 and represented Scotland in the 2007 Women's World Cup of Golf where she and her partner Janice Moodie finished fourth.

She is one of three women to hold the professional course record of 67 at the Old Course of St. Andrews.

== Professional wins (1) ==
=== ALPG Tour wins (1) ===
- 2003 (1) AAMI Women's Australian Open

== Team appearances ==
Amateur

- European Ladies' Team Championship (representing Scotland): 1993, 1995
- Vagliano Trophy (representing Great Britain & Ireland): 1993 (winners), 1995, 1997
- Curtis Cup (representing Great Britain & Ireland): 1994 (tie, Cup retained), 1996 (winners)
- Espirito Santo Trophy (representing Great Britain & Ireland): 1996
- Commonwealth Trophy (representing Great Britain): 1995

Professional

- Solheim Cup (representing Europe): 2002, 2003 (winners)
- World Cup (representing Scotland): 2007, 2008

=== Solheim Cup record ===
Year	Total matches	Total W–L–H	Singles W–L–H	Foursomes W–L–H	Fourballs W–L–H	Points won	Points %
Career	5	2–3–0	1–1–0	0–1–0	1–1–0	2	40%
2002	3	1–2–0	0–1–0 lost to P. Hurst 3&2	0–1–0 lost w/I. Tinning 3&2	1–0–0 won w/C. Koch 3&2	1	33.3%
2003	2	1–1–0	1–0–0 def B. Daniel conceded on 15	0–0–0	0–1–0 lost w/A.B. Sanchez 5&4	1	50%
