= Kirsty S. Taylor =

English professional golfer

Personal information
- Nationality: England
- Born: 2 May 1979 (age 47) Overton, Hampshire, England

Career
- Sport: Golf
- Turned professional: 2001
- Former tours: Ladies European Tour (joined 2002); Ladies Asian Golf Tour; LET Access Series (joined 2012)

Best results in LPGA major championships
- Chevron Championship: DNP
- Women's PGA C'ship: DNP
- U.S. Women's Open: DNP
- Women's British Open: CUT: 2003, 2004, 2005, 2006
- Evian Championship: DNP

Achievements and awards
- Ladies European Tour Rookie of the Year: 2002

Kirsty S. Taylor (born 2 May 1979) is an English professional golfer. In 2002, she joined the Ladies European Tour and won the LET Rookie of the Year title.

== Career ==
Taylor, from Overton, Hampshire, started playing when she was 12. Attached to Sandford Springs Golf Club, she had international success as an amateur, winning the Italian Ladies Amateur in 2000 and the Portuguese Ladies Amateur in 2001.

Taylor was on the English National Team but was omitted from the 2002 Curtis Cup squad and advised by the English Ladies' Golf Association she did not match their fitness criteria. Instead, she turned professional in late 2001 and played on the Ladies Asian Golf Tour over the winter, recording a high finish on the order of merit.

In 2022, she joined the Ladies European Tour, where she captured the 2022 LET Rookie of the Year title after recording a season-best finish of solo 3rd at the Wales WPGA Championship of Europe.

In 2004, she tied for 7th at the Tenerife Ladies Open, and in 2006 she tied for 3rd at the same event, three strokes behind winner Riikka Hakkarainen. She was one of seven LET players taken to hospital at the 2005 Finnair Masters after a mini-tornado tore through the course during the third round.

In 2008, she tied for 4th at the Dutch Ladies Open, five strokes behind Gwladys Nocera. In 2012 she joined the LET Access Series, before announcing her retirement from tour at the end of the season.

== Amateur wins ==
- 2000 Italian International Ladies Amateur Championship
- 2001 Portuguese International Ladies Amateur Championship

== Results in LPGA majors ==
Taylor only played in the Women's British Open.

! Tournament	2004	2005	2006	2007
Women's British Open	CUT	CUT	CUT	CUT

CUT = missed the half-way cut
