= 2002 Solheim Cup =

Women's team golf competition

- Dates: September 20–22, 2002
- Venue: Interlachen Country Club
- Location: Edina, Minnesota
- Captains: Patty Sheehan (USA); Dale Reid (Europe)
| (United States) | 15 1/2 | 12 1/2 | (Europe) |
- United States wins the Solheim Cup

Location map
- Location within the United States Location within Minnesota

The 7th Solheim Cup Match was held between September 20 and September 22, 2002, at Interlachen Country Club, Edina, Minnesota, USA. Team USA won the trophy for the fifth time by a score of 15 1/2 to 12 1/2 points. Rosie Jones gained the winning point in her victory over Karine Icher.

This was the last Solheim Cup to be held in an even-numbered year, as the next Solheim Cup would take place in 2003 and every odd-numbered year thereafter.

== Teams ==
The European team was supposed to be made up of seven automatic qualifiers and five wild card picks but there was a tie for seventh position so there were eight automatic qualifiers and only four picks from Captain Dale Reid. The US team consisted of 10 automatic qualifiers and two picks from Captain Patty Sheehan.

Europe

- Captain
  - Dale Reid - Ladybank, Scotland
- Automatic qualifiers
  - Annika Sörenstam - Stockholm, Sweden
  - Raquel Carriedo - Zaragoza, Spain
  - Karine Icher - Châteauroux, France
  - Paula Martí - Barcelona, Spain
  - Sophie Gustafson - Särö, Sweden
  - Suzann Pettersen - Oslo, Norway
  - Iben Tinning - Copenhagen, Denmark
  - Maria Hjorth - Falun, Sweden
- Captains Picks
  - Laura Davies - Coventry, England
  - Helen Alfredsson - Gothenburg, Sweden
  - Carin Koch - Kungalv, Sweden
  - Mhairi McKay - Glasgow, Scotland

United States

- Captain
  - Patty Sheehan - Middlebury, Vermont
- Automatic qualifiers
  - Juli Inkster - Santa Cruz, California
  - Laura Diaz - Scotia, New York
  - Rosie Jones - Santa Ana, California
  - Michele Redman - Zanesville, Ohio
  - Cristie Kerr - Miami, Florida
  - Meg Mallon - Natick, Massachusetts
  - Beth Daniel - Charleston, South Carolina
  - Wendy Ward - San Antonio, Texas
  - Emilee Klein - Santa Monica, California
  - Kelli Kuehne - Dallas, Texas
- Captains Picks
  - Kelly Robbins - Mt. Pleasant, Michigan
  - Pat Hurst - San Leandro, California

== Format ==
The match format was slightly changed from 2000. A total of 28 points were available, divided among four periods of team play, followed by one period of singles play. The first period, on Friday morning, was four rounds of foursomes. This was followed in the afternoon by four rounds of fourball. This schedule was repeated on the Saturday morning and afternoon. The four periods on Friday and Saturday accounted for 16 points. During these team periods, the players played in teams of two. All players had to play in at least one session of the first two days. The final 12 points were decided in a round of singles matchplay, in which all 24 players (12 from each team) took part.

== Day one ==
Friday, September 20, 2002

=== Morning foursomes ===
| | Results |
|---|---|---|
| Davies/Martí | (Europe) 2 up | Inkster/Diaz |
| Tinning/Carriedo | (United States) 1 up | Daniel/Ward |
| Alfredsson/Pettersen | (Europe) 4 & 2 | Robbins/Hurst |
| Sörenstam/Koch | (Europe) 3 & 2 | Mallon/Kuehne |
| 3 | Session | 1 |
| 3 | Overall | 1 |

=== Afternoon fourball ===
| | Results |
|---|---|---|
| Davies/Martí | (United States) 1 up | Jones/Kerr |
| Gustafson/Icher | (United States) 4 & 3 | Diaz/Klein |
| Sörenstam/Hjorth | (United States) 2 & 1 | Redman/Mallon |
| McKay/Koch | (Europe) 3 & 2 | Inkster/Kuehne |
| 1 | Session | 3 |
| 4 | Overall | 4 |

== Day two ==
Saturday, September 21, 2002

=== Morning foursomes ===
| | Results |
|---|---|---|
| Sörenstam/Koch | (Europe) 4 & 3 | Redman/Kerr |
| McKay/Tinning | (United States) 3 & 2 | Klein/Ward |
| Davies/Martí | (United States) 2 & 1 | Mallon/Inkster |
| Alfredsson/Pettersen | (United States) 3 & 1 | Diaz/Robbins |
| 1 | Session | 3 |
| 5 | Overall | 7 |

=== Afternoon fourball ===
| | Results |
|---|---|---|
| Sörenstam/Koch | (Europe) 4 & 3 | Daniel/Ward |
| Hjorth/Tinning | (Europe) 1 up | Kuehne/Hurst |
| Icher/Carriedo | (Europe) 1 up | Kerr/Jones |
| Davies/Gustafson | (Europe) 1 up | Robbins/Klein |
| 4 | Session | 0 |
| 9 | Overall | 7 |

== Day three ==
Sunday, September 22, 2002

=== Singles ===
| | Results |
|---|---|---|
| Raquel Carriedo | (United States) 4 & 3 | Juli Inkster |
| Paula Martí | (United States) 5 & 3 | Laura Diaz |
| Helen Alfredsson | (United States) 2 & 1 | Emilee Klein |
| Iben Tinning | (Europe) 3 & 2 | Kelli Kuehne |
| Suzann Pettersen | halved | Michele Redman |
| Annika Sörenstam | halved | Wendy Ward |
| Maria Hjorth | (United States) 5 & 3 | Kelly Robbins |
| Sophie Gustafson | (Europe) 3 & 2 | Cristie Kerr |
| Laura Davies | (United States) 3 & 2 | Meg Mallon |
| Mhairi McKay | (United States) 3 & 2 | Pat Hurst |
| Carin Koch | halved | Beth Daniel |
| Karine Icher | (United States) 3 & 2 | Rosie Jones |
| 3 1/2 | Session | 8 1/2 |
| 12 1/2 | Overall | 15 1/2 |

== Individual player records ==
Each entry refers to the win–loss–half record of the player.

=== United States ===
| Player | Points | Overall | Singles | Foursomes | Fourballs |
|---|---|---|---|---|---|
| Beth Daniel | 1.5 | 1–1–1 | 0–0–1 | 1–0–0 | 0–1–0 |
| Laura Diaz | 3 | 3–1–0 | 1–0–0 | 1–1–0 | 1–0–0 |
| Pat Hurst | 1 | 1–2–0 | 1–0–0 | 0–1–0 | 0–1–0 |
| Juli Inkster | 2 | 2–2–0 | 1–0–0 | 1–1–0 | 0–1–0 |
| Rosie Jones | 2 | 2–1–0 | 1–0–0 | 0–0–0 | 1–1–0 |
| Cristie Kerr | 1 | 1–3–0 | 0–1–0 | 0–1–0 | 1–1–0 |
| Emilee Klein | 3 | 3–1–0 | 1–0–0 | 1–0–0 | 1–1–0 |
| Kelli Kuehne | 0 | 0–4–0 | 0–1–0 | 0–1–0 | 0–2–0 |
| Meg Mallon | 3 | 3–1–0 | 1–0–0 | 1–1–0 | 1–0–0 |
| Michele Redman | 1.5 | 1–1–1 | 0–0–1 | 0–1–0 | 1–0–0 |
| Kelly Robbins | 2 | 2–2–0 | 1–0–0 | 1–1–0 | 0–1–0 |
| Wendy Ward | 2.5 | 2–1–1 | 0–0–1 | 2–0–0 | 0–1–0 |

=== Europe ===
| Player | Points | Overall | Singles | Foursomes | Fourballs |
|---|---|---|---|---|---|
| Helen Alfredsson | 1 | 1–2–0 | 0–1–0 | 1–1–0 | 0–0–0 |
| Raquel Carriedo | 1 | 1–2–0 | 0–1–0 | 0–1–0 | 1–0–0 |
| Laura Davies | 2 | 2–3–0 | 0–1–0 | 1–1–0 | 1–1–0 |
| Sophie Gustafson | 2 | 2–1–0 | 1–0–0 | 0–0–0 | 1–1–0 |
| Maria Hjorth | 1 | 1–2–0 | 0–1–0 | 0–0–0 | 1–1–0 |
| Karine Icher | 1 | 1–2–0 | 0–1–0 | 0–0–0 | 1–1–0 |
| Carin Koch | 4.5 | 4–0–1 | 0–0–1 | 2–0–0 | 2–0–0 |
| Paula Martí | 1 | 1–3–0 | 0–1–0 | 1–1–0 | 0–1–0 |
| Mhairi McKay | 1 | 1–2–0 | 0–1–0 | 0–1–0 | 1–0–0 |
| Suzann Pettersen | 1.5 | 1–1–1 | 0–0–1 | 1–1–0 | 0–0–0 |
| Annika Sörenstam | 3.5 | 3–1–1 | 0–0–1 | 2–0–0 | 1–1–0 |
| Iben Tinning | 2 | 2–2–0 | 1–0–0 | 0–2–0 | 1–0–0 |
