= Interlachen Country Club =

Private golf club

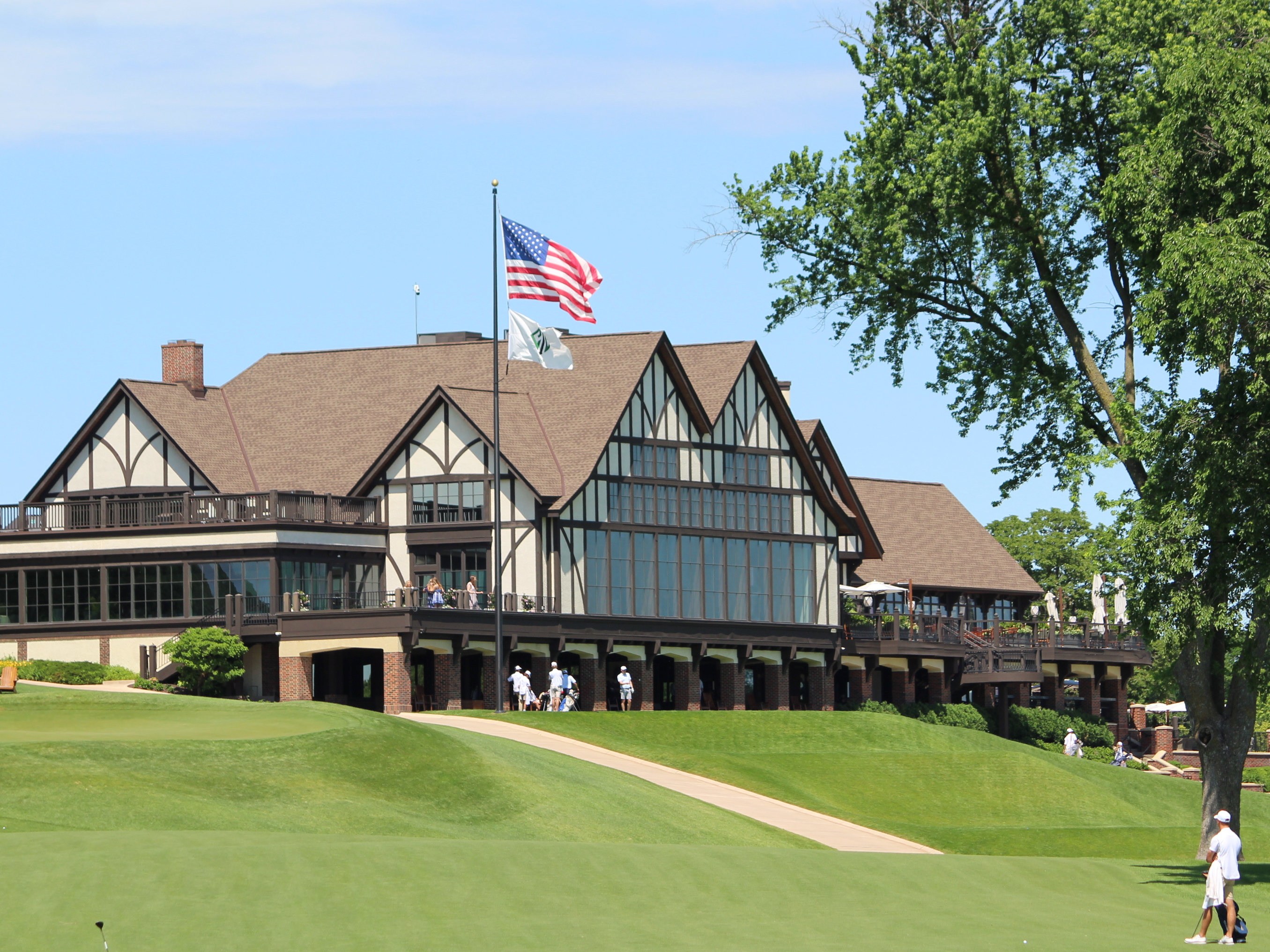
- Clubhouse

- Location within the United States Location within Minnesota
- 44.9153°N 93.3797°W

Club information
- Location: Edina, Minnesota, U.S.
- Elevation: 900 feet (275 m)
- Established: 1909; 117 years ago
- Type: Private
- Total holes: 18
- Designed by: Donald Ross
- Par: 72/70
- Course rating: 74.3
- Slope rating: 141

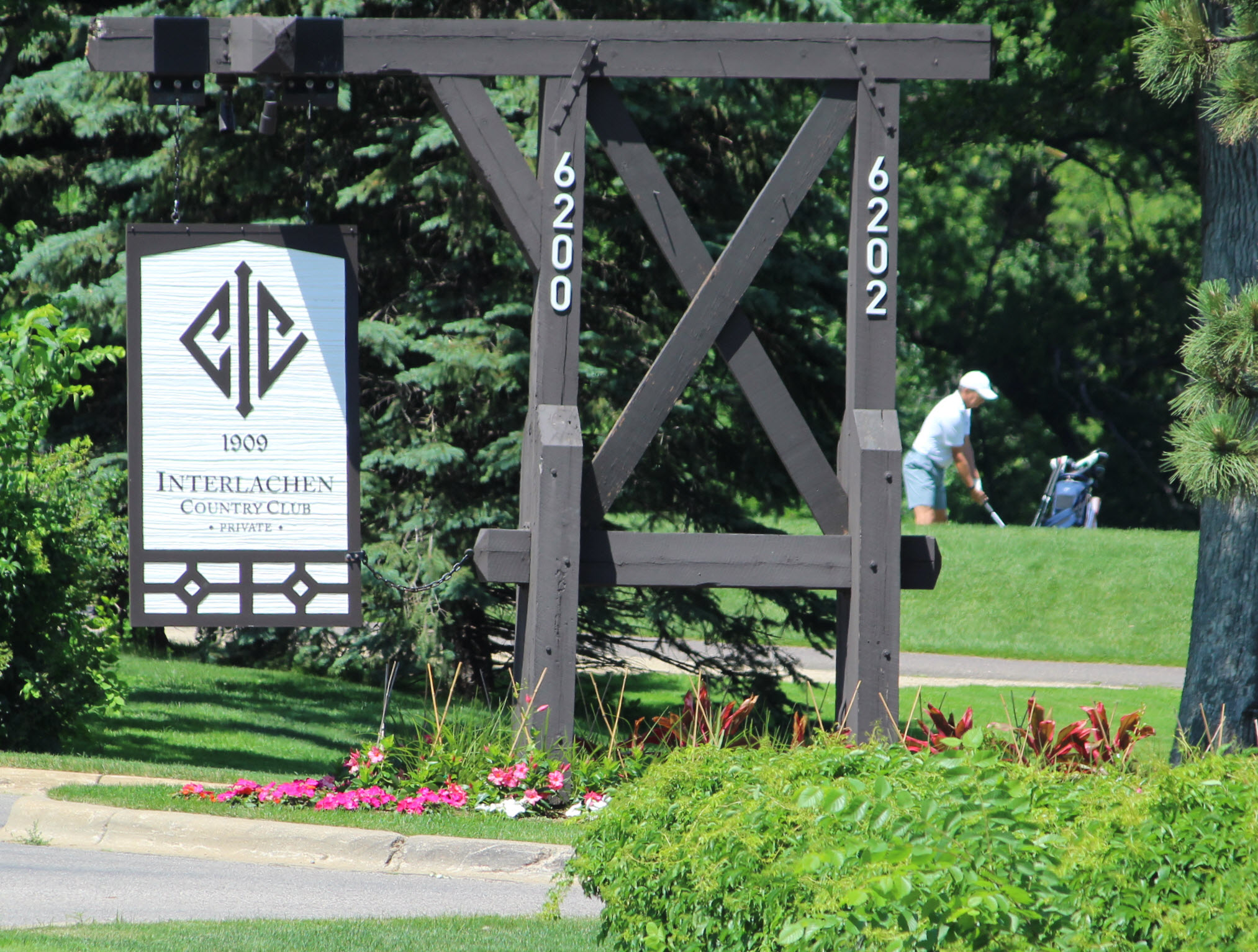
Sign at main entrance

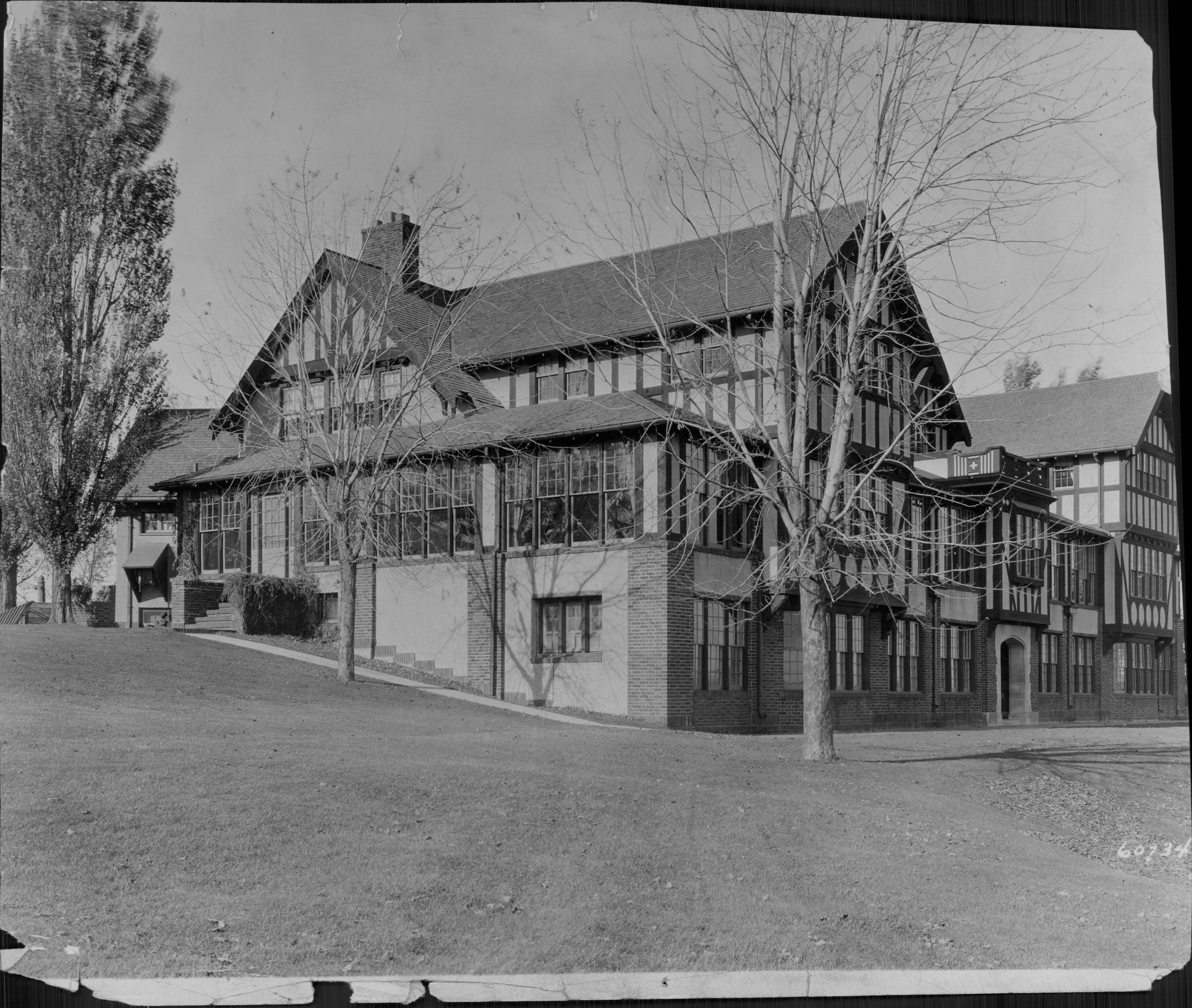
Historical photograph of Clubhouse

The Interlachen Country Club is a private country club in Edina, Minnesota which has hosted several national golf tournaments, including the 1930 U.S. Open (won by Bobby Jones on his way to winning the Grand Slam), the 2002 Solheim Cup, and the 2008 U.S. Women's Open.

== History ==
Interlachen's history dates from November 16, 1909, when several members of the Bryn Mawr Golf Club decided to found a new golf club and purchased 146 acres of farmland alongside a suburban Minneapolis streetcar line. The club was officially incorporated on December 31, and the original golf course was opened on July 29, 1911. The 6,120-yard course was designed by Willie Watson, a well-known Scottish course architect of the time who had already designed The Minikahda Club and Lafayette Club in the Twin Cities area.

In the spring of 1910, the English Tudor-style clubhouse was designed which included nine bedrooms. The original grounds included tennis, horseback riding, and trap shooting.

George Sargent, who won the 1909 U.S. Open and was later president of the PGA of America, was the head professional for a few years.

In 1919, the club decided to redesign the course. The new 18-hole course, which is largely the same today, was designed by Donald Ross and opened in 1921. Robert Trent Jones made some alterations in 1963, and Geoffrey Cornish renovated it in 1986. In 2004, Andrew Green performed a complete course restoration, bringing back Ross' original vision and modernizing the course. The course is 7,201 yards long, and is a par 72.

The course is consistently ranked Golf Digest's list of the 100 best courses in the United States. It reached a high ranking of #36 in 2004. After the course restoration, Interlachen jumped 20 spots in the annual ranking from 84 to 64 in 2025. It has been ranked in the top 100 nationally every year since 1971 and the best in Minnesota since 1997.

The first major tournament held at Interlachen was the Western Open in 1914. In July 1930, the club was the site of the U.S. Open championship. Bobby Jones had already won the British Amateur and the British Open that year, and continued his run by winning at Interlachen by two strokes over Macdonald Smith. Jones completed his unprecedented Grand Slam by winning the U.S. Amateur later in the year. The club was scheduled to host the 1942 U.S. Open, but the event was cancelled after the outbreak of World War II.

The club also hosted the 1935 U.S. Women's Amateur Championship, which was won by Glenna Collett Vare 3 & 2 over Patty Berg. Berg was a 17-year-old member of Interlachen, and was playing in her first national tournament. She went on to a strong amateur and professional career, and was a founding member of the Ladies Professional Golf Association (LPGA).

The 2002 Solheim Cup was held at Interlachen, with the United States retaking the cup by a score of 15½ to 12½. Europe was ahead 9–7 heading into the last day, but the U.S. staged a comeback in the singles matches for the narrow win.

Inbee Park won the U.S. Women's Open at Interlachen on June 29, 2008. In January 2022, Interlachen was awarded the 2030 U.S. Women's Open.

== Course ==
=== Scorecard (Black Tees) ===
| Hole | Yards | Par | Hole | Yards | Par |
|---|---|---|---|---|---|
| 1 | 531 | 5 | 10 | 397 | 4 |
| 2 | 414 | 4 | 11 | 482 | 4 |
| 3 | 225 | 3 | 12 | 562 | 5 |
| 4 | 578 | 5 | 13 | 207 | 3 |
| 5 | 193 | 3 | 14 | 440 | 4 |
| 6 | 345 | 4 | 15 | 407 | 4 |
| 7 | 413 | 4 | 16 | 323 | 4 |
| 8 | 452 | 4 | 17 | 270 | 3 |
| 9 | 534 | 5 | 18 | 428 | 4 |
| Out | 3,685 | 37 | In | 3,516 | 35 |
| | | | Total | 7,201 | 72 |

== Tournaments ==
- 1914 Western Open, won by Jim Barnes
- 1916 Trans-Mississippi Amateur, won by Harry Legg
- 1930 U.S. Open, won by Bobby Jones
- 1935 U.S. Women's Amateur, won by Glenna Collett Vare
- 1986 U.S. Senior Amateur, won by R.S. Williams
- 1993 Walker Cup, won by the United States over Great Britain & Ireland, 19-5
- 2002 Solheim Cup, won by the United States over Europe, 15½-12½
- 2008 U.S. Women's Open, won by Inbee Park
- 2016 Junior Ryder Cup, won by team USA 15½-8½
