= Volvo Cross Country Challenge =

Women's professional golf series

Tournament information
- Established: 2005
- Tour: Ladies European Tour
- Prize fund: $120,000 $1,000,000 (bonus); Volvo XC70
- Final year: 2007

Final champion
- (England) Kiran Matharu

The Volvo Cross Country Challenge was a women's professional golf series on the Ladies European Tour. It was a separate dedicated yearly order of merit for events in the Nordic region and held each year from 2005 to 2007.

The winner of the challenge received a Volvo car and prize money. The 18-year-old Kiran Matharu from Leeds, England, had yet to learn to drive when she won the Challenge and a brand new Volvo XC70 in 2007.

== Participation ==
To qualify, players had to participate in at least three out of four of the LET tournaments hosted in Nordic countries:

1. Scandinavian TPC hosted by Annika (Sweden)
2. SAS Masters (Norway)
3. Finnair Masters (Finland)
4. Nykredit Masters (Denmark)

Prize money collected in these tournaments were added up in a "Volvo XC Challenge Order-of-Merit". The top ten players on this Order-of-Merit shared a prize fund of $120,000.

In addition, players could get $1,000,000 bonus by winning all four of the above tournaments in one season.

== Winners ==
Year	Winner	Points	Ref.
2007	(England) Kiran Matharu	280	
2006	(England) Laura Davies	577.5	
2005	(Sweden) Cecilia Ekelundh	307	

== Order of Merit ==
The winners were determined by an Order of Merit based on results in the four tournaments, calculated using a points-based system.

=== 2005 ===
Pos.	Player	Tournaments				Tmts	Total	
Pos.	Player	Sweden	Norway	Finland	Denmark	Tmts	Money	Points
1	(Sweden) Cecilia Ekelundh	T25 –	N O T H E L D	T2; 157	3; 150	3	34,508	307
2	(Denmark) Iben Tinning	T18 –	N O T H E L D	T16; 4	1st 300	3	39,310	304
3	(Denmark) Lisa Holm Sorensen	T49 –	N O T H E L D	1st 300	T61 –	4	33,020	300
4	(Norway) Suzann Pettersen	6; 70	N O T H E L D	T2; 177	•	3	32,533	247
5	(Sweden) Lora Fairclough	T38 –	N O T H E L D	T12; 27.5	2; 275	3	27,398	227.5

=== 2006 ===
Pos.	Player	Tournaments				Tmts	Total	
Pos.	Player	Sweden	Norway	Finland	Denmark	Tmts	Money	Points
1	(England) Laura Davies	T5; 80	1st 300	T11; 22.5	T2; 175	4	69,855	577.5
2	(France) Virginie Lagoutte	T34 –	T3; 135	1st 300	T12; 17.5	4	49,550	452.5
3	(Denmark) Karen Margrethe Juul	T23 –	T11; 11	T6; 48	1st 300	4	44,195	359
4	(France) Gwladys Nocera	4; 120	T11; 11	T3; 135	T8; 40	4	46,942	306
5	(Sweden) Annika Sörenstam	1st 300	•	•	•	1	75,000	300

=== 2007 ===
Pos.	Player	Tournaments				Tmts	Total	
Pos.	Player	Sweden	Norway	Finland	Denmark	Tmts	Money	Points
1	(France) Kiran Matharu	T28 –	•	T4; 105	T2; 175	3	32,145	280
2	(Sweden) Lotta Wahlin	T60 –	T34 –	3; 150	4; 120	4	28,090	270
3	(Sweden) Johanna Westerberg	T58 –	T6; 60	2; 200	T19 –	4	31,263	260
4	(England) Kirsty Taylor	T39 –	•	T33 –	2; 200	3	22,738	175
5	(Italy) Diana Luna	T97 –	T3; 135	•	T10; 25	3	15,884	160

Win
Top 5
Made points cut
• Did not play
