= Marine Monnet =

French professional golfer

Marine Monnet-Melocco
Personal information
- Nationality: France
- Born: 1978 (age 47–48) Saint-Nom-la-Bretèche, Paris, France

Career
- Sport: Golf
- Turned professional: 1999
- Former tours: Ladies European Tour (2000–2005); LPGA Tour (2003)
- Professional wins: 1

Best results in LPGA major championships
- Chevron Championship: T72: 2001
- Women's PGA C'ship: DNP
- U.S. Women's Open: CUT: 2001
- Women's British Open: T18: 2002

Marine Monnet-Melocco (born 1978) is a French professional golfer who played on the Ladies European Tour and LPGA Tour. She won The Women's Amateur in 1999 and finished third on the LET Order of Merit in 2000.

== Amateur career ==
Monnet won the 1996 Girls Amateur Championship, the 1999 European Ladies' Team Championship for France, and the 1999 Vagliano Trophy representing the Continent of Europe. The same year she crowned her amateur career by winning The Women's Amateur Championship against England's Rebecca Hudson.

== Professional career ==
=== Ladies European Tour ===
Monnet turned professional in the end of 1999 and joined the Ladies European Tour in 2000. She almost secured a win in her first season. At the Ladies Irish Open she had a four stroke lead after the penultimate round, but after a final round of 74 she had to settle for runner-up, one stroke behind Sophie Gustafson. This was the closest Monnet ever came to a LET victory, over her six LET seasons she finished third eight times; at the Marrakech Palmeraie Open, Ladies Hannover Expo 2000 Open, Kronenbourg 1664 Chart Hills Classic, P4 Norwegian Masters, Arras Open de France Dames, Tenerife Ladies Open, KLM Ladies Open and the Open de España Femenino. While a win proved elusive, her many top-10 positions helped her do well in the Order of Merit, finishing third in 2000, fourth in 2001, and seventh in 2002.

In 2001, she won the Lalla Meryem Cup when it was still a non-LET invitational event.

Her best result in an LET Major was a fourth place at the 2001 Evian Masters, an event co-sanctioned by the LPGA Tour.

At the 2003 Women's Australian Open, she shot seven consecutive birdies, a LET record.

Monnet shot her career first hole-in-one at the 2005 Samsung Ladies Masters in Singapore, and won a car.

=== LPGA Tour ===
In March 2002, Monnet and Lorena Ochoa, then a sophomore at the University of Arizona, received the two sponsor's invites to play the PING Banner Health at Moon Valley Country Club in Phoenix, Arizona. In October 2002 Monnet earned exempt status on the LPGA Tour by finishing T10 at the LPGA Final Qualifying Tournament.

== Amateur wins ==
- 1996 Girls Amateur Championship
- 1999 The Women's Amateur Championship

== Professional wins ==
- 2001 Lalla Meryem Cup

== Results in LPGA majors ==
Tournament	2001	2002	2003	2004	2005
Kraft Nabisco Championship	T72				
LPGA Championship					
U.S. Women's Open	CUT				
Women's British Open	T56	T18			CUT

Did not play

CUT = missed the half-way cut
"T" = tied

== Team appearances ==
Amateur

- European Ladies' Team Championship (representing France): 1999 (winners)
- Vagliano Trophy (representing the Continent of Europe): 1999 (winners)
- Espirito Santo Trophy (representing France): 1996, 1998
