= Ladies Open of Portugal =

Golf tournament in Portugal

Tournament information
- Location: Portugal
- Established: 1985
- Course(s): Campo Real
- Par: 72
- Tour(s): Ladies European Tour
- Format: Stroke play
- Prize fund: €200,000
- Final year: 2011

Final champion
- (South Africa) Ashleigh Simon

The Ladies Open of Portugal was a women's professional golf tournament on the Ladies European Tour that took place in Portugal.

== Winners ==
Year	Venue	Winner	Country	Score	Margin of victory	Runner(s)-up	Ref
ISPS Handa Portugal Ladies Open
2011	Campo Real	Ashleigh Simon	South Africa	200 (−16)	3 strokes	(France) Gwladys Nocera	
Portugal Ladies Open
2010	Campo Real	Karen Lunn	Australia	204 (−12)	1 stroke	(England) Trish Johnson (Denmark) Iben Tinning	
Ladies Open of Portugal
2009	Golden Eagle	Johanna Westerberg	Sweden	213 (−3)	Playoff	(Spain) Tania Elósegui	
2008	Quinta de Cima	Anne-Lise Caudal	France	203 (−16)	1 stroke	(England) Gwladys Nocera (England) Georgina Simpson	
Ladies Open de Portugal
2007	Gramacho Pestana	Sophie Giquel	France	206 (−10)	2 strokes	(Sweden) Louise Stahle	
Estoril Ladies Open of Portugal
2006	Quinta da Marinha Oitavos	Stéphanie Arricau	France	207 (−9)	5 strokes	(France) Gwladys Nocera	
Algarve Ladies Open of Portugal
2005	Gramacho Pestana	Cecilia Ekelundh	Sweden	210 (−6)	3 strokes	(France) Ludivine Kreutz	
Ladies Open of Portugal
2004	Aroeira I	Cecilia Ekelundh	Sweden	206 (−10)	3 strokes	(Sweden) Linda Wessberg	
Lancia Ladies Open of Portugal
2003	Aroeira II	Alison Munt	Australia	209 (−7)	Playoff	(Germany) Elisabeth Esterl	
Ladies Open of Costa Azul
2002	Aroeira II	Kanna Takanashi	Japan	139 (−5)	1 stroke	(Scotland) Julie Forbes	
1998–2002: No tournament
Estoril Ladies Open
1997	Clube de Golf do Estoril	Mandy Sutton	England	202	1 stroke	(Denmark) Karina Orum	
Costa Azul Ladies Open
1996	Troia and Aroeira GC	Shani Waugh	Australia	214 (−2)	2 strokes	(Republic of Ireland) Aideen Rogers (France) Marie-Laure de Lorenzi (Sweden) Helene Koch (Philippines) Mary Grace Estuesta	
1995	Troia and Montado GC	Marie-Laure de Lorenzi	France	205	2 strokes	(Switzerland) Evelyn Orley	
1994	Montado Troia and Aroeira GC	Sandrine Mendiburu	France	140	1 stroke	(England) Lora Fairclough	
1989–1993: No tournament
Portuguese Ladies Open
1988	Vilamoura GC (Pinhal)	Peggy Conley	United States	291	1 stroke	(Australia) Corinne Dibnah	
1987	Vale do Lobo GC (Royal)	Cathy Panton	Scotland	210 (−9)	1 stroke	(England) Alison Nicholas	
1986	Vilamoura GC (Pinhal)	Cathy Panton	Scotland	286 (−6)	Playoff	(United States) Kelly Leadbetter (Scotland) Gillian Stewart	
Vale do Lobo Portuguese Ladies Open
1985	Vale do Lobo GC (Royal)	Debbie Dowling	England	285	4 strokes	(England) Kitrina Douglas	
