= 2006 Ladies European Tour =

Golf tournament series

2006 Ladies European Tour season
- Duration: January 2006 – October 2006
- Number of official events: 21
- Order of Merit: (England) Laura Davies
- Player of the Year: (France) Gwladys Nocera
- Rookie of the Year: (Australia) Nikki Garrett
- Lowest stroke average: (Sweden) Annika Sörenstam

The 2006 Ladies European Tour was a series of weekly golf tournaments for elite female golfers from around the world which took place from January through October 2006. The tournaments were sanctioned by the Ladies European Tour (LET).

The season featured 21 events with prize money totalling more than €10.6 million. Laura Davies won the Order of Merit with earnings of €471,727 and Gwladys Nocera was Player of the Year.

== Tournament results ==
The table below shows the 2006 schedule. The numbers in brackets after the winners' names show the number of career wins they had on the Ladies European Tour up to and including that event. This is only shown for members of the tour.

Key

Major championships
LET majors in **bold**
Regular events
Team championships

Dates	Tournament	Host country	Winner	Notes
22 Jan	Acer World Cup of Golf	South Africa	(Sweden) Liselotte Neumann and Annika Sörenstam (n/a)	Team event Unofficial LPGA Tour event
5 Feb	ANZ Ladies Masters	Australia	(South Korea) Amy Yang (1)	Co-sanctioned with the ALPG Tour
30 Apr	Tenerife Ladies Open	Spain	(Finland) Riikka Hakkarainen (1)	
14 May	Open De España Femenino	Spain	(New Zealand) Lynnette Brooky (4)	
21 May	Ladies Swiss Open	Switzerland	(France) Gwladys Nocera (1)	
28 May	Vediorbis Open de France	France	(Italy) Veronica Zorzi (2)	
4 Jun	KLM Ladies Open	Netherlands	(France) Stéphanie Arricau (3)	
17 Jun	Ladies Italian Open	Italy	(France) Gwladys Nocera (2)	
24 Jun	Ladies Open of Portugal	Portugal	(France) Stéphanie Arricau (4)	
15 Jul	Ladies Central European Open	Hungary	(England) Rebecca Hudson (1)	
23 Jul	Catalonia Ladies Masters	Spain	(France) Gwladys Nocera (3)	
29 Jul	**Evian Masters**	France	(Australia) Karrie Webb (n/a)	Co-sanctioned by the LPGA Tour
6 Aug	**Weetabix Women's British Open**	England	(United States) Sherri Steinhauer (n/a)	Co-sanctioned by the LPGA Tour
13 Aug	Scandinavian TPC hosted by Annika	Sweden	(Sweden) Annika Sörenstam (14)	
20 Aug	Wales Ladies Championship of Europe	Wales	(Sweden) Linda Wessberg (1)	
27 Aug	SAS Masters	Norway	(England) Laura Davies (35)	
3 Sep	Finnair Masters	Finland	(France) Virginie Lagoutte (2)	
10 Sep	Nykredit Masters	Denmark	(Denmark) Karen Margrethe Juul (1)	
17 Sep	Austrian Ladies Open	Austria	(Sweden) Sophie Gustafson (12)	
8 Oct	BBC Radio Kent Ladies’ English Open	England	(Sweden) Cecilia Ekelundh (3)	
29 Oct	Dubai Ladies Masters	United Arab Emirates	(Sweden) Annika Sörenstam (15)	

== Order of Merit rankings ==
Rank	Player	Country	Earnings (€)
1	Laura Davies	England	471,727
2	Gwladys Nocera	France	415,021
3	Annika Sörenstam	Sweden	225,822
4	Sophie Gustafson	Sweden	193,774
5	Veronica Zorzi	Italy	143,881
6	Linda Wessberg	Sweden	142,414
7	Stéphanie Arricau	France	140,377
8	Rebecca Hudson	England	123,836
9	Riikka Hakkarainen	Finland	112,361
10	Karen Margrethe Juul	Denmark	107,532

== See also ==
- 2006 LPGA Tour
- 2006 in golf
