= 2005 Ladies European Tour =

Golf tournament series

2005 Ladies European Tour season
- Duration: February 2005 – September 2005
- Number of official events: 21
- Order of Merit: (Denmark) Iben Tinning
- Player of the Year: (Denmark) Iben Tinning
- Rookie of the Year: (Spain) Elisa Serramià
- Lowest stroke average: (England) Laura Davies

The 2005 Ladies European Tour was a series of golf tournaments for elite female golfers from around the world which took place from January through December 2005. The tournaments were sanctioned by the Ladies European Tour (LET).

== Tournaments ==
The table below shows the 2005 schedule. The numbers in brackets after the winners' names show the number of career wins they had on the Ladies European Tour up to and including that event. This is only shown for members of the tour.

| Date | Name | Venue | Location | Winner | Prize fund | Prize fund (€) | Notes |
|---|---|---|---|---|---|---|---|
| 5 Feb | Samsung Ladies Masters | Laguna National Golf & Country Club | Singapore | (South Korea) Song Bo-bae (n/a) | $200,000 | 150,590 | Team event co-sanctioned by the five main women's tours Unofficial prize money |
| 13 Feb | Women's World Cup of Golf | The Links, Fancourt Resort | South Africa | Japan; Ai Miyazato & Rui Kitada | $1,000,000 | 752,950 | Team event Unofficial prize money |
| 27 Feb | ANZ Ladies Masters | RACV Royal Pines Resort | Australia | (Australia) Karrie Webb (7) | $800,000 | 499,216 | Co-sanctioned by the ALPG Tour |
| 3 Apr | Thailand Ladies Open | Alpine Golf & Sports Club | Thailand | (Australia) Shani Waugh (3) | $330,000 | 248,474 | |
| 10 Apr | Tenerife Ladies Open | Costa Adeje GC | Spain | (France) Ludivine Kreutz (2) | 242,000 | €242,000 | |
| 15 May | Open de España Femenino | Panorámica Club de Golf | Spain | (Denmark) Iben Tinning (3) | €275,000 | 275,000 | |
| 29 May | Siemens Austrian Ladies Open | Golfclub Fohrenwald | Austria | (Italy) Federica Piovano (1) | €250,000 | 250,000 | |
| 5 Jun | BMW Ladies Italian Open | Parco de' Medici | Italy | (Denmark) Iben Tinning (4) | €300,000 | 300,000 | |
| 12 Jun | Vediorbis Open de France Dames | Golf d'Arras | France | (Italy) Veronica Zorzi (1) | €300,000 | 300,000 | |
| 26 Jun | Algarve Ladies Open of Portugal | Gramacho Pestana Golf Resort | Portugal | (Sweden) Cecilia Ekelundh (2) | €300,000 | 300,000 | |
| 10 Jul | Ladies English Open | Chart Hills Golf Club, Biddenden | England | (Sweden) Maria Hjorth (2) | €165,000 | 165,000 | |
| 16 Jul | Ladies Central European Open | Old Lake Golf Club | Hungary | (France) Ludivine Kreutz (3) | €165,000 | 165,000 | |
| 23 Jul | **Evian Masters** | Evian Resort Golf Club | France | (United States) Paula Creamer (n/a) | $2,500,000 | 1,882,375 | Co-sanctioned by the LPGA Tour |
| 31 Jul | **Weetabix Women's British Open** | Royal Birkdale Golf Club | England | (South Korea) Jang Jeong (n/a) | $1,800,000 | 1,499,571 | Co-sanctioned by the LPGA Tour |
| 7 Aug | Scandinavian TPC hosted by Annika | Barsebäck Golf & Country Club | Sweden | (Sweden) Annika Sörenstam (13) | €495,000 | 495,000 | |
| 14 Aug | Wales Ladies Championship of Europe | Machynys Peninsula Golf Country Club, Llanelli | Wales | (England) Kirsty Taylor (1) | £350,000 | 510,650 | |
| 28 Aug | Finnair Masters | Helsinki Golf Club | Finland | (Denmark) Lisa Holm Sorensen (1) | €200,000 | 200,000 | |
| 4 Sep | Nykredit Masters | Kokkedal Golfklub | Denmark | (Denmark) Iben Tinning (5) | €200,000 | 200,000 | |
| 11 Sep | Solheim Cup | Crooked Stick Golf Club | United States | United States | Team event; no prize money | | Co-sanctioned by the LPGA Tour |
| 18 Sep | KLM Ladies Open | Kennemer Golf & Country Club | Netherlands | (France) Virginie Lagoutte (1) | €165,000 | 165,000 | |
| 24 Sep | Catalonia Ladies Masters | Golf Platja de Pals | Spain | (France) Karine Icher (5) | €190,000 | 190,000 | |

Major championships in bold.

== Order of Merit rankings ==
| Rank | Player | Earnings (€) | Tournaments |
|---|---|---|---|
| 1 | (Denmark) Iben Tinning | 204,672 | 15 |
| n/a | (Sweden) Annika Sörenstam | 180,639 | 3 |
| n/a | (Sweden) Sophie Gustafson | 168,825 | 3 |
| 2 | (France) Gwladys Nocera | 164,739 | 18 |
| 3 | (Sweden) Maria Hjorth | 158,524 | 8 |
| 4 | (Sweden) Cecilia Ekelundh | 154,893 | 19 |
| 5 | (Italy) Veronica Zorzi | 154,184 | 14 |
| 6 | (France) Ludivine Kreutz | 147,211 | 18 |
| 7 | (England) Kirsty Taylor | 129,964 | 17 |
| 8 | (England) Laura Davies | 124,661 | 7 |
| 9 | (France) Karine Icher | 123,790 | 7 |
| n/a | (Sweden) Carin Koch | 121,105 | 3 |
| n/a | (Sweden) Liselotte Neumann | 119,281 | 3 |
| 10 | (England) Trish Johnson | 116,190 | 14 |

Note: Participation in a minimum of six tournaments was required to be counted for the Order of Merit.

== See also ==
- 2005 LPGA Tour
- 2005 in golf
