= 2004 Ladies European Tour =

Golf tournament series

2004 Ladies European Tour season
- Duration: February 2004 – October 2004
- Number of official events: 15
- Order of Merit: (England) Laura Davies
- Player of the Year: (France) Stéphanie Arricau
- Rookie of the Year: (Finland) Minea Blomqvist
- Lowest stroke average: (England) Laura Davies

The 2004 Ladies European Tour was a series of golf tournaments for elite female golfers from around the world which took place from January through December 2004. The tournaments were sanctioned by the Ladies European Tour (LET).

== Tournaments ==
The table below shows the 2004 schedule. The numbers in brackets after the winners' names show the number of career wins they had on the Ladies European Tour up to and including that event. This is only shown for members of the tour.

Date	Name	Venue	Location	Winner	Prize fund	Prize fund (€)	Notes
27 Feb	ANZ Ladies Masters	RACV Royal Pines Resort	Australia	(Sweden) Annika Sörenstam (11)	$800,000	€483,000	Co-sanctioned by the ALPG Tour
7 Mar	AAMI Women's Australian Open	Concord Golf Club	Australia	(England) Laura Davies (36)	$550,000	€332,156	Co-sanctioned by the ALPG Tour
2 May	Tenerife Ladies Open	Buenavista Golf, Isla Baja	Spain	(Italy) Diana Luna (1)	€220,000	€220,000	
9 May	Ladies Open of Portugal	Aroeira Golf Club	Portugal	(Sweden) Cecilia Ekelundh (1)	€300,000	€300,000	
30 May	Union Fenosa Open de España Femenino	Club de Golf La Coruña	Spain	(France) Stéphanie Arricau (1)	€275,000	€275,000	
6 Jun	BMW Ladies Italian Open	Parco di Roma Golf Club	Italy	(Spain) Ana Belén Sánchez (1)	€275,000	€275,000	
13 Jun	Arras Open de France Dames	Golf d'Arras	France	(France) Stéphanie Arricau (2)	€275,000	€275,000	
27 Jun	KLM Ladies Open	Kennemer Golf & Country Club	Netherlands	(Germany) Elisabeth Esterl (2)	€165,000	€165,000	
11 Jul	Ladies English Open	Chart Hills Golf Club, Biddenden	England	(Sweden) Maria Hjorth (1)	£125,000	€179,063	
18 Jul	Ladies Central European Open	Old Lake Golf Club	Hungary	(Finland) Minea Blomqvist (1)	€165,000	€165,000	
24 Jul	**Evian Masters**	Evian Masters Golf Club	France	(Australia) Wendy Doolan (n/a)	$2,500,000	€1,977,826	Co-sanctioned by the LPGA Tour
1 Aug	**Weetabix Women's British Open**	Sunningdale Golf Club	England	(England) Karen Stupples (1)	£1,050,000	€1,504,125	Co-sanctioned by the LPGA Tour
8 Aug	HP Open	Ullna Golf Club	Sweden	(Sweden) Annika Sörenstam (12)	£325,000	€465,563	
15 Aug	Wales "Golf as it should be" Ladies Open	Royal Porthcawl Golf Club	Wales	(England) Trish Johnson (14)	£350,000	€501,375	
3 Oct	Catalonia Ladies Masters	Club de Golf Sant Cugat	Spain	(France) Karine Icher (4)	€180,000	€180,000	

Major championships in bold.

== Order of Merit rankings ==
Rank	Player	Country	Points
1	Laura Davies	England	777.26
2	Trish Johnson	England	672.65
3	Stephanie Arricau	France	657.77
4	Karine Icher	France	517.57
5	Åsa Gottmo	Sweden	421.53
6	Cecilia Ekelundh	Sweden	415.55
7	Minea Blomqvist	Finland	401.53
8	Becky Brewerton	Wales	378.56
9	Linda Wessberg	Sweden	365.95
10	Ana Sánchez	Spain	350.93

== See also ==
- 2004 LPGA Tour
- 2004 in golf
