= Kiran Matharu =

English golfer

Kiran Kaur Matharu
Personal information
- Nationality: England
- Born: 27 February 1989 (age 37) Leeds, West Yorkshire, England
- Height: 1.73 m (5 ft 8 in)

Career
- Sport: Golf
- Turned professional: 2006
- Current tour: Ladies European Tour (joined 2007)

Best results in LPGA major championships
- Chevron Championship: DNP
- Women's PGA C'ship: DNP
- U.S. Women's Open: DNP
- Women's British Open: CUT: 2008, 2011

Kiran Matharu (born 27 February 1989) is a female English professional golfer currently playing on the Ladies European Tour.

== Amateur career ==
Matharu was a member of the Faldo Series development programme and 2004 and 2005 Faldo Series Girls' Champion. She received an invite to play in her first Ladies European Tour tournament at the 2005 Open De España Femenino, the year she was Welsh Ladies' Strokeplay Championship runner-up. 2006 saw her represent Great Britain and Ireland in the Curtis Cup after winning the English Women's Amateur Championship. She was named Sony Entertainment Asia 2006 Female Junior Sports Personality of the Year for the second successive year.

== Professional career ==
Matharu turned professional in August 2006 after winning the English Ladies Amateur title and finished 15th in her first professional tournament. Her application to play in the 2006 LPGA Tour qualifying school was denied by Carolyn Bivens, the new commissioner, but Matharu finished tied 3rd at the 2006 Ladies European Tour qualifying school to earn exempt status for the 2007 season. At age 18 in 2007, she was able to participate in LPGA qualifying school without special approval. She missed the cut after the fourth round in the final qualifying tournament and did not receive LPGA membership for 2008.

Matharu was 18 years old when she won a Volvo XC70 car in the 2007 Volvo Cross Country Challenge; she was unable to drive at that time. She clinched the win in her first season on the LET after finishing tied-fourth at Finnair Masters, 28th at Scandinavian TPC hosted by Annika and tied-second-place at the Nykredit Masters.

== Team appearances ==
Amateur

- Curtis Cup (representing Great Britain & Ireland): 2006
