= Alison Munt =

Australian golfer

Personal information
- Nationality: Australia
- Born: 21 October 1965 (age 61)

Career
- Sport: Golf
- Status: Professional
- Former tours: Ladies European Tour; ALPG Tour
- Professional wins: 5

Number of wins by tour
- Ladies European Tour: 3
- WPGA Tour of Australasia: 2

Best results in LPGA major championships
- U.S. Women's Open: T44: 1991
- du Maurier Classic: T57: 1991
- Women's British Open: CUT: 2001, 2002, 2003

Alison Munt (born 21 October 1965) is an Australian professional golfer. She played on the Ladies European Tour as well as on the ALPG Tour in her home country.

Munt won three times on the Ladies European Tour between 2000 and 2003, the last time aged 37, after beating Elisabeth Esterl in a playoff in Portugal.

She finished third at the 2000 TSN Ladies World Cup Golf in partnership with Jane Crafter.

== Professional wins (5) ==
=== Ladies European Tour wins (3) ===
No.	Date	Tournament	Winning score	Margin of victory	Runner-up
1	28 May 2000	Ladies Hannover Expo 2000 Open	−4 (67-72-73=212)	1 stroke	(Belgium) Valérie Van Ryckeghem
2	15 Oct 2000	Marrakech Palmeraie Open	−9 (70-70-67=207)	3 strokes	(England) Trish Johnson
3	25 May 2003	Lancia Ladies Open of Portugal	−7 (69-72-68=209)	Playoff	(Germany) Elisabeth Esterl

Ladies European Tour playoff record (1–0)

No.	Year	Tournament	Opponent	Result
1	2005	Lancia Ladies Open of Portugal	(Germany) Elisabeth Esterl	Won with bogey on first extra hole

=== ALPG Tour wins (2) ===
- 1988 LPGAA Championship
- 2001 Aristocrat Mollymook Women's Classic

== Team appearances ==
Amateur

- Commonwealth Trophy (representing Australia): 1987
- Tasman Cup (representing Australia): 1987 (tied)

Professional

- TSN Ladies World Cup Golf (representing Australia): 2000
