= Lisa Holm Sørensen =

Danish professional golfer

Personal information
- Nationality: Denmark
- Born: 29 September 1982 (age 44) Hanstholm, Denmark

Career
- Sport: Golf
- Turned professional: 2003
- Former tour: Ladies European Tour (joined 2004)
- Professional wins: 2

Number of wins by tour
- Ladies European Tour: 1
- Other: 1

Best results in LPGA major championships
- Chevron Championship: DNP
- Women's PGA C'ship: DNP
- U.S. Women's Open: DNP
- Women's British Open: CUT: 2007, 2008
- Evian Championship: DNP

Lisa Holm Sørensen (born 29 September 1982) is a Danish retired professional golfer who played on the Ladies European Tour (LET) and won the Ladies Finnish Masters.

== Career ==
Sørensen won her first LET event at the 2005 Ladies Finnish Masters, held at Helsinki Golf Club. Following the event Sørensen rose to 16th on the 2008 Money List and briefly became the leading Dane on the Ladies European Tour.

=== Round of 62 (−11) ===
In the first round of the 2009 SAS Ladies Masters at Larvik Golfklubb in Norway, Sørensen equalled the LET 18-hole record when she shot 62 (−11) on a par-73 course. At the time, she shared this feat with only three other players, Trish Johnson (1996 Ladies French Open), Kirsty Taylor (2005 Wales Ladies Championship of Europe) and Nina Reis (2008 Göteborg Masters).

==== Hole by hole ====
- Hole 3, 151 yard par 3: birdie – eight-iron to three metres
- Hole 6, 157 yard par 3: birdie – eight-iron to two metres
- Hole 7, 425 yard par 4: birdie – nine iron to 40 cm
- Hole 8, 174 yard par 3: birdie – six-iron to 1.5 metres
- Hole 9, 451 yards par 5: birdie – seven-iron to 15 metres, two putts
- Hole 12, 506 yard par 5: birdie – 52 degree wedge to 4 metres
- Hole 13, 180 yard par 3: birdie – 5-iron to 1 metre
- Hole 14, 362 yard par 4: birdie – 56 degree wedge to half a metre
- Hole 15, 162 yard par 3: birdie – eight-iron to five metres
- Hole 17, 434 yard par 5: birdie – second shot to four metres, two putts
- Hole 18, 476 yard par 5: birdie – chip to one metre

==== Scorecard ====
Hole	1	2	3	4	5	6	7	8	9	Out	10	11	12	13	14	15	16	17	18	In	Total
Par	5	4	3	5	4	3	4	3	5	36	4	3	5	3	4	3	5	5	5	37	73
Score	5	4	2	5	4	2	3	2	4	31	4	3	4	2	3	2	5	4	4	31	62
Score	E	E	−1	−1	−1	−2	−3	−4	−5	−5	−5	−5	−6	−7	−8	−9	−9	−10	−11	−6	−11

== Amateur wins ==
- 2000 Doug Sanders International
- 2001 Danish Matchplay Championship
- 2002 Danish Matchplay Championship, No. 9 World Championship

== Professional wins (2) ==
=== Ladies European Tour wins (1) ===
No.	Date	Tournament	Winning score	Margin of victory	Runners-up
1	28 Aug 2005	Ladies Finnish Masters	−4 (70-70=140)^	1 stroke	(Sweden) Cecilia Ekelundh, (Norway) Suzann Pettersen (Sweden) Caroline Westrup, (Finland) Ursula Wikström

^Shortened to 36 holes due to severe weather conditions

=== Ladies African Tour wins (1) ===
No.	Date	Tournament	Winning score	Margin of victory	Runner-up	Ref
1	15 Mar 2008	Telkom Women's Classic	–13 (66-68-69=203)	2 strokes	(Sweden) Maria Bodén	

== Team appearances ==
Amateur

- European Ladies' Team Championship (representing Denmark): 2001, 2003
- Espirito Santo Trophy (representing Denmark): 2002

== See also ==
- Ladies European Tour records
- Jim Furyk's round of 58
- Lowest rounds of golf
