= Caroline Westrup =

Norwegian-Swedish professional golfer (born 1986)

Personal information
- Full name: Caroline Westrup Gaeta
- Nationality: Norway (2015–); Sweden (1986–2015)
- Born: 11 February 1986 (age 40) Kristianstad, Sweden
- Height: 5 ft 8 in (1.73 m)

Career
- Sport: Golf
- College: Florida State University
- Turned professional: 2009
- Former tours: LPGA Tour (joined 2014); Ladies European Tour (joined 2011); Symetra Tour (joined 2010)
- Professional wins: 1

Number of wins by tour
- Epson Tour: 1

Best results in LPGA major championships
- Chevron Championship: DNP
- Women's PGA C'ship: DNP
- U.S. Women's Open: T59: 2013
- Women's British Open: DNP
- Evian Championship: DNP

Achievements and awards
- FSU Athletic Hall of Fame: 2019
- WGCA Hall of Fame: 2024

Caroline Westrup Gaeta (born 11 February 1986) is a Norwegian-Swedish professional golfer and coach who played on the LPGA Tour and Ladies European Tour. She was runner-up at the 2005 Ladies Finnish Masters, individual medalist at the 2006 Espirito Santo Trophy, and won the 2015 Sioux Falls GreatLIFE Challenge. She represented Sweden until acquiring Norwegian citizenship in 2015.

== Early life and education ==
Westrup grew up in Åhus, Sweden before moving to Bærum, Norway at age 11 after her father, Charlie Westrup, was appointed head coach of the Norwegian Golf Federation. At 16 she returned to Sweden to attend the Swedish National Golf Gymnasium in Perstorp, from which she graduated in 2005.

Westrup attended Florida State University from 2005 to 2009, where she majored in sports management and recorded five wins in collegiate competition. She were a two-time NGCA All-American First Team selection and four-time All-Atlantic Coast Conference (ACC) Scholar-Athlete selection. She competed in the NCAA Championships three times, in 2006 with her teammates and in 2007 and 2008 as an individual. Westrup was inducted into the FSU Athletic Hall of Fame in 2019, and the WGCA Hall of Fame in 2024.

== Amateur career ==
Westrup had a successful amateur career and was part of the Swedish national team from 2001, including the team that finished silver medalist at the 2002 European Girls' Team Championship in Turin. In 2002, she was third in strokeplay at the Girls Amateur Championship.

She was part of the winning European team at the 2003 Junior Solheim Cup at Bokskogen Golf Club, and the Swedish team winning the 2006 European Lady Junior's Team Championship in the Netherlands (with a six-person team including Anna Nordqvist and Pernilla Lindberg).

Representing Sweden, Westrup was the low individual scorer at the 2006 Espirito Santo Trophy in Stellenbosch, South Africa, with a score of 8-under-par 280. The Swedish team finished tied with the host nation, but South Africa was declared the winner, since their third player had a lower score than Sweden's third player, in the third round. The initial tiebreaker, the final round non-counting score of the respective teams, was equal.

While still an amateur, Westrup finished runner-up at the 2005 Ladies Finnish Masters a stroke behind Lisa Holm Sørensen, her best result on the Ladies European Tour. She won the 2005 Swedish Junior Strokeplay Championship at Jönköping Golf Club, with a 3-under-par score of 277, nine strokes ahead of nearest competitor.

Westrup reached the semi-finals of the 2007 Ladies' British Open Amateur Championship, and finished third with Anna Nordqvist and Pernilla Lindberg in the team competition. Paired with Nordqvist, she won her final game against the Netherlands 6 & 4 to capture the 2008 European Ladies' Team Championship.

== Professional career ==
Westrup turned professional after graduating in 2009, and made her professional debut at the Wales Ladies Championship of Europe on the Ladies European Tour (LET), earning her first paycheck finishing tied 40th. She spent 2010 on the Symetra Tour in the United States, and played on the LET in 2011 and 2012, before earning conditional status on the LPGA Tour in 2014.

Westrup made the cut at the 2013 U.S. Women's Open, and during her professional career her best finish on the LPGA Tour was tied 49th at the 2014 Yokohama Tire LPGA Classic, and her best finish on the LET was 7th at the 2011 UniCredit Ladies German Open.

Westrup changed her citizenship to Norwegian in early 2015 in order to gain better access to sponsors and increase her chances to qualify for the 2016 Summer Olympics. Her first tournament representing Norway was the 2015 Gateway Classic near Phoenix, Arizona. She arrived in the US on her Swedish passport which unbeknownst to her automatically got cancelled once her application for Norwegian citizenship was successful. Stranded without a valid travel document she had to find her way to the Norwegian consulate in Houston to apply for a Norwegian passport. She finished the Olympic Qualifications as a reserve, losing out to Suzann Pettersen and Marianne Skarpnord.

== Coaching career ==
Westrup retired from touring in 2018, after nine years on tour, and began as a golf coach at IMG Academy in Bradenton, Florida. In 2021, she became assistant coach at the University of Georgia, and in 2022 she was appointed head coach at the University of Missouri.

== Amateur wins ==
- 2005 Swedish Junior Strokeplay Championship
- 2006 Espirito Santo Trophy (individual), Liz Murphey Collegiate Classic, Tar Heel Invitational
- 2007 Chrysler Challenge
- 2008 Cleveland Golf Classic, Cougar Classic

== Professional wins (1) ==
=== Symetra Tour (1) ===
No.	Date	Tournament	Winning score	Margin of victory	Runner-up
1	6 Sep 2015	Sioux Falls GreatLIFE Challenge	−12 (67-65-71-69=272)	2 strokes	(Sweden) Daniela Holmqvist

== Team appearances ==
Amateur

- European Girls' Team Championship (representing Sweden): 2002, 2003
- Junior Solheim Cup (representing Europe): 2003 (winners)
- European Lady Junior's Team Championship (representing Sweden): 2006 (winners)
- European Ladies' Team Championship (representing Sweden): 2007, 2008 (winners)
- Espirito Santo Trophy (representing Sweden): 2006 (individual winner)
