= Virginie Lagoutte-Clément =

French professional golfer

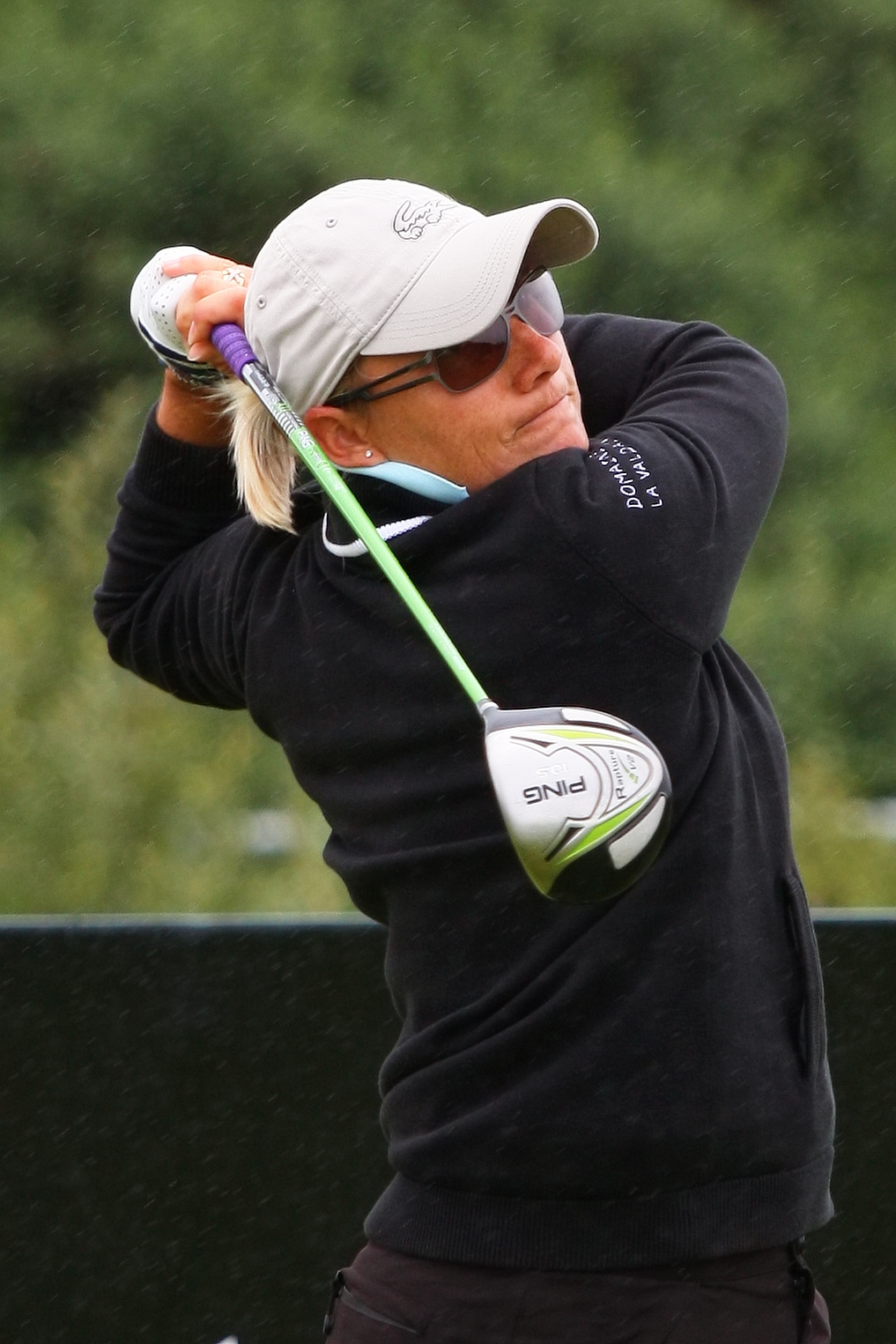
- Lagoutte-Clément in 2010

Personal information
- Nickname: Vivi
- Nationality: France
- Born: 2 February 1979 (age 47) Montélimar, France
- Height: 1.69 m (5 ft 7 in)

Career
- Sport: Golf
- Turned professional: 2003
- Former tour: Ladies European Tour
- Professional wins: 3

Number of wins by tour
- Ladies European Tour: 3

Best results in LPGA major championships
- Chevron Championship: DNP
- Women's PGA C'ship: DNP
- U.S. Women's Open: DNP
- Women's British Open: T16: 2007

Virginie Lagoutte-Clément (born 2 February 1979) is a French professional golfer. She played on the Ladies European Tour for ten seasons 2004–2013 and won three titles.

== Career ==
Lagoutte turned professional in late 2003 and joined the Ladies European Tour (LET) in 2004.

Lagoutte-Clement played on the LET for ten seasons from 2004 to 2013, and won three titles, the 2005 KLM Ladies Open, the 2006 Finnair Masters, and the 2010 Ladies Scottish Open. She was also runner-up at the EMAAR-MGF Ladies Masters and KLM Ladies Open in 2007, as well as the UNIQA Ladies Golf Open and Tenerife Ladies Open in 2010. Lagoutte-Clement finished a career-best 6th on the Money List in 2010 with a total of six top-5 finishes, and was in contention for a spot at the 2011 Solheim Cup.

Lagoutte-Clement recorded her best major result at the 2007 Women's British Open at the Old Course at St Andrews, where she tied for 16th place.

In 2008, Lagoutte-Clement represented France alongside Gwladys Nocera at the fourth Women's World Cup of Golf in Sun City, South Africa.

== Personal life ==
She competed as Virginie Lagoutte until her marriage to Sebastien Clément, her caddie, in December 2006.

== Professional wins (3) ==
=== Ladies European Tour wins (3) ===
No.	Date	Tournament	Winning score	To par	Margin of victory	Runner(s)-up
1	18 Sep 2005	KLM Ladies Open	215	−1	Playoff	(Wales) Eleanor Pilgrim
2	3 Sep 2006	Finnair Masters	203	−10	2 strokes	(Sweden) Elin Ohlsson
3	20 Aug 2010	Ladies Scottish Open	217	+1	1 stroke	(England) Trish Johnson (South Africa) Lee-Anne Pace (England) Sophie Walker

LET playoff record (1–0)

No.	Year	Tournament	Opponent	Result
1	2005	KLM Ladies Open	(Wales) Eleanor Pilgrim	Won at the second playoff hole

== Team appearances ==
Professional

- World Cup (representing France): 2008

== Results in LPGA majors ==
Played only in the Women's British Open.

Tournament	2007	2008	2009	2010	2011
Women's British Open	T16			CUT	T64

Did not play

CUT = missed the half-way cut
"T" = tied
