= Elin Ohlsson =

Swedish professional golfer (born 1979)

Personal information
- Full name: Elin Linnéa Ohlsson
- Nationality: Sweden
- Born: 20 February 1979 (age 47) Vetlanda, Sweden

Career
- Sport: Golf
- College: University of Missouri
- Turned professional: 2003
- Former tours: Ladies European Tour (2004–2008); Swedish Golf Tour (2003–2013); Nedbank Women's Golf Tour (2005–2006)

Elin Ohlsson (born 20 February 1979) is a Swedish professional golfer and former Ladies European Tour player. She was runner-up at the 2006 Finnair Masters and the 2003 European Ladies' Team Championship.

== Early life and amateur career ==
Ohlsson was born in Vetlanda in 1979. She attended the University of Missouri from 1999 to 2003 and played with the Missouri Tigers women's golf team. She was named to the Academic All-Big 12 First Team twice, and registered the lowest stroke average on the team as a senior.

Ohlsson finished 3rd at the 2003 European Ladies Amateur in Ireland, three strokes behind winner Virginie Beauchet.

She also appeared for the national team, and helped to earn a silver medal at the 2003 European Ladies' Team Championship in Frankfurt, where her team fell to Spain in the final, 4 1/2–2 1/2. She won the 2003 Swedish Ladies' Team Championship with Vetlanda Golf Club.

== Professional career ==
Ohlsson turned professional after graduating in 2003 and joined the Swedish Golf Tour, where she stayed active until 2013. In 2010, she was runner-up at the Smådalarö Gård Open.

Ohlsson joined the Ladies European Tour in 2004 after earning status by finishing 21st at Q-School, and played on the LET for five seasons until 2008. In 2006, she led the Finnair Masters in Helsinki, and ultimately finished runner-up two strokes behind Virginie Lagoutte-Clement.

Ohlsson also played on the Nedbank Women's Golf Tour in 2005 and 2006, and finished 6th at the 2006 South African Women's Open, won by Rebecca Hudson.

Before joining Sand Golf Club, Ohlsson was attached to A6 Golf Club, where she advised on the creation of the A6 Ladies Open.

== Team appearances ==
Amateur

- European Ladies' Team Championship (representing Sweden): 2003
