= Finnair Masters =

Golf tournament on Ladies European Tour

Ladies Finnish Masters
Tournament information
- Location: Helsinki, Finland
- Established: 2005
- Course: Helsinki Golf Club
- Par: 72
- Length: 6,609 yards (6,043 m)
- Tour: Ladies European Tour
- Format: 54-hole Stroke play
- Prize fund: €200,000
- Final year: 2011

Tournament record score
- Aggregate: 199 Lee-Anne Pace (2010)
- To par: −14 as above

Final champion
- (Sweden) Caroline Hedwall
- Location in Europe

The Ladies Finnish Masters was a women's professional golf tournament on the Ladies European Tour held in Helsinki, Finland, between 2005 and 2011. In 2006 Finnair, the country's largest airline, became title sponsor and it changed name to the Finnair Masters. The 54-hole tournament was played every year at the Helsinki Golf Club and with a purse of €200,000 had one of the smaller prize funds on the tour.

Between 2005 and 2007 the tournament was a constituent of the Volvo Cross Country Challenge, which offered a bonus pool of $100,000 for events in the Nordic region, with the added bonus of $1million should any player win all four of the Volvo Cross Country Challenge events.

== Winners ==
Year	Date	Winner	Country	Score	To par	Margin of victory	Runner(s)-up	Winner's share (€)
Finnair Masters
2011	2 Jul	Caroline Hedwall	Sweden	202	−11	2 strokes	(Netherlands) Christel Boeljon	30,000
2010	29 Aug	Lee-Anne Pace	South Africa	199	−14	3 strokes	(Scotland) Vikki Laing	30,000
2009	30 Aug	Beatriz Recari	Spain	202	−11	Playoff (Note: Recari won on the first extra hole in 2009 with an eagle from the fairway.)	(Denmark) Iben Tinning	30,000
2008	31 Aug	Minea Blomqvist	Finland	202	−11	1 stroke	(Finland) Ursula Wikström	30,000
2007	2 Sep	Bettina Hauert	Germany	207	−6	3 strokes	(Sweden) Johanna Westerberg	30,000
2006	3 Sep	Virginie Lagoutte	France	203	−10	2 strokes	(Sweden) Elin Ohlsson	30,000
Ladies Finnish Masters
2005	28 Aug	Lisa Holm Sørensen	Denmark	140 (Note: The inaugural 2005 tournament was reduced to 36 holes due to inclement weather.)	−2	1 stroke	(Sweden) Cecilia Ekelundh (Norway) Suzann Pettersen (Sweden) Caroline Westrup (a) (Finland) Ursula Wikström	30,000

== See also ==
- Ladies Finnish Open
