= 2003 Solheim Cup =

Women's team golf competition

- Dates: 12–14 September 2003
- Venue: Barsebäck Golf & Country Club
- Location: Loddekopinge, Skåne, Sweden
- Captains: Catrin Nilsmark (Europe); Patty Sheehan (USA)
(Europe)	17 1/2	10 1/2	(United States)
- Europe wins the Solheim Cup

Location map
- Location within Europe Location within Sweden

The 2003 Solheim Cup was the eighth Solheim Cup, held 12–14 September 2003 at Barsebäck Golf & Country Club in Loddekopinge, Skåne, Sweden. This was the first time the European team hosted outside of the United Kingdom.

When Rosie Jones of the U.S. conceded a birdie putt to Catriona Matthew giving her a 3&1 win, Europe reached the 14 1/2 points required to win the Solheim Cup for the third time. With the overall competition's outcome decided, amid some controversy, four of the five remaining matches were conceded for a final score of 17 1/2 to 10 1/2.

== Teams ==
The European team consisted of seven automatic qualifiers and five wild card picks from Captain Catrin Nilsmark. The US team consisted of 10 automatic qualifiers and two picks from Captain Patty Sheehan.

Europe

- Captain
  - Catrin Nilsmark - Gothenburg, Sweden
- Automatic qualifiers
  - Annika Sörenstam - Stockholm, Sweden
  - Laura Davies - Coventry, England
  - Sophie Gustafson - Särö, Sweden
  - Elisabeth Esterl - Dingolfing, Germany
  - Iben Tinning - Copenhagen, Denmark
  - Ana Belén Sánchez - Málaga, Spain
  - Mhairi McKay - Glasgow, Scotland
- Captains Picks
  - Carin Koch - Kungalv, Sweden
  - Catriona Matthew - North Berwick, Scotland
  - Patricia Meunier-Lebouc - Dijon, France
  - Janice Moodie - Glasgow, Scotland
  - Suzann Pettersen - Oslo, Norway

United States

- Captain
  - Patty Sheehan - Middlebury, Vermont
- Automatic qualifiers
  - Juli Inkster - Santa Cruz, California
  - Rosie Jones - Santa Ana, California
  - Beth Daniel - Charleston, South Carolina
  - Michele Redman - Zanesville, Ohio
  - Laura Diaz - Scotia, New York
  - Cristie Kerr - Miami, Florida
  - Meg Mallon - Natick, Massachusetts
  - Angela Stanford - Fort Worth, Texas
  - Kelly Robbins - Mt. Pleasant, Michigan
  - Wendy Ward - San Antonio, Texas
- Captains Picks
  - Heather Bowie - Washington, D.C.
  - Kelli Kuehne - Dallas, Texas

== Format ==

Location in Europe

The match format was unchanged from 2002. A total of 28 points were available, divided among four periods of team play, followed by one period of singles play. The first period, on Friday morning, was four rounds of foursomes. This was followed in the afternoon by four rounds of fourballs. This schedule was repeated on the Saturday morning and afternoon. The four periods on Friday and Saturday accounted for 16 points. During these team periods, the players played in teams of two. All players had to play in at least one session of the first two days . The final 12 points were decided in a round of singles matchplay, in which all 24 players (12 from each team) took part.

== Day one ==
Friday, 12 September 2003

=== Morning foursomes ===
The European team started Day 1 strongly, dominating the foursomes matches. The first point was won by the Scottish pairing of Catriona Matthew and Janice Moodie. A birdie putt on 15 sealed the 5&3 win for the Scottish pairing who had, somewhat controversially, not been picked for the 2002 team. The second European point was also gained on the 15th green. Annika Sörenstam and Suzann Pettersen had gone 4 up after 11 and closed out the match 4&3.

The third victorious European team was Sophie Gustafson and Solheim Cup rookie, Elisabeth Esterl who beat the highly experienced American combination of Meg Mallon and Rosie Jones 3&2 winning the 16th. The US team avoided a morning session whitewash by gaining a half point in the top match. Carin Koch and Laura Davies were one up with five to play but Beth Daniel and Kelly Robbins made a birdie at the 15th and the match was halved.

	Results
Koch/Davies	halved	Daniel/Robbins
Moodie/Matthew	(Europe) 5 & 3	Inkster/Ward
Sörenstam/Pettersen	(Europe) 4 & 3	Diaz/Bowie
Gustafson/Esterl	(Europe) 3 & 2	Mallon/Jones
3 1/2	Session	1/2
3 1/2	Overall	1/2

=== Afternoon fourball ===
The afternoon fourball matches saw a fightback from the US team. Only Suzann Pettersen and the four months pregnant Patricia Meunier-Lebouc won a point for the Europeans beating US rookie Angela Stanford and veteran Meg Mallon. Juli Inkster and Beth Daniel, at 48 the oldest ever Solheim Cup player, came back from 1 down with three to play to win 1up on the 18th against Annika Sörenstam and Carin Koch thus ending Koch's unbeaten record. Kelli Kuehne and Cristie Kerr won the top match against Laura Davies and Catriona Matthew, whilst Michele Redman and Rosie Jones came from behind with Redman chipping in from off the green on 14.

	Results
Davies/Matthew	(United States) 2 & 1	Kuehne/Kerr
Sörenstam/Koch	(United States) 1 up	Inkster/Daniel
Pettersen/Meunier-Lebouc	(Europe) 3 & 2	Stanford/Mallon
Gustafson/Tinning	(United States) 1 up	Redman/Jones
1	Session	3
4 1/2	Overall	3 1/2

== Day two ==
Saturday, 13 September 2003

=== Morning foursomes ===
Europe won three out of a potential four points in the morning foursomes to extend their lead. The big hitting Scandinavian pairing of Suzann Pettersen and Sophie Gustafson kicked things off with a 3&1 win over previous day winners Cristie Kerr and Kelli Kuehne. The second match saw two European rookies, Iben Tinning and Elisabeth Esterl, the first German to play in the Solheim Cup, taking on US rookie Angela Stanford and veteran Michele Redman. This match was always close and Tinning had to hole a testy 4 footer on 18 to gain a half.

Annika Sörenstam and Carin Koch returned to winning ways beating Wendy Ward and Heather Bowie. They won three holes around the turn and parred the 16th hole to win 3&2. The bottom match was also very close and ended in a half when neither team could make a birdie.

	Results
Gustafson/Pettersen	(Europe) 3 & 1	Kuehne/Kerr
Esterl/Tinning	halved	Stanford/Redman
Sörenstam/Koch	(Europe) 3 & 2	Ward/Bowie
Moodie/Matthew	halved	Mallon/Robbins
3	Session	1
7 1/2	Overall	4 1/2

=== Afternoon fourball ===
The afternoon fourballs started encouragingly for the US team. The European rookie pairing, playing their first match of the week, Ana Belén Sánchez and Mhairi McKay were well beaten 5&4 by the veteran US combination of Beth Daniel and Juli Inkster. The US won match two as well, Kelli Kuehne and Cristie Kerr teaming up once more to beat Laura Davies and Sophie Gustafson 2&1 winning both the 16th and 17th holes. The Scottish pair of Janice Moodie and Catriona Matthew got a point back for Europe. They were 1 up after 11, then won the 12th, 14th and 15th to win 4&3.

The final match of the day had a spectacular finish. Laura Diaz and Kelly Robbins had a tap in birdie on the 17th hole only for Annika Sörenstam to halve the hole with a 20-foot putt from the fringe of the green. On 18, Diaz had a six-foot putt for birdie but missed. Pettersen's birdie putt from ten feet did not miss and Europe had a three-point lead going into the final day singles.

	Results
Sánchez/McKay	(United States) 5 & 4	Daniel/Inkster
Gustafson/Davies	(United States) 2 & 1	Kuehne/Kerr
Moodie/Matthew	(Europe) 4 & 3	Ward/Jones
Sörenstam/Pettersen	(Europe) 1 up	Robbins/Diaz
2	Session	2
9 1/2	Overall	6 1/2

== Day three ==
Sunday, 14 September 2003

=== Singles ===
Janice Moodie led off for Europe taking a four-hole lead after seven holes, eventually beating Kelli Kuehne 3&2. Juli Inkster got the first point of the day for the US team comprehensively beating Carin Koch. Sophie Gustafson beat Heather Bowie 5&4 to leave Bowie pointless for the week.

Iben Tinning was 3 up at the turn on Wendy Ward and won when Ward missed a par putt on 17. Ana Belén Sánchez fought hard all day but eventually lost to Michele Redman. Annika Sörenstam was never behind and always in control in her win over Angela Stanford and minutes after she won, Catriona Matthew gained the winning point and the remaining matches were conceded with the winner being whoever was in the lead. The match between Laura Davies and Meg Mallon was level at the time and Davies won because Mallon offered to concede first.

	Results
Janice Moodie	(Europe) 3 & 2	Kelli Kuehne
Carin Koch	(United States) 5 & 4	Juli Inkster
Sophie Gustafson	(Europe) 5 & 4	Heather Bowie
Iben Tinning	(Europe) 2 & 1	Wendy Ward
Ana Belén Sánchez	(United States) 3 & 1	Michele Redman
Catriona Matthew	(Europe) 3 & 1	Rosie Jones
Annika Sörenstam	(Europe) 3 & 2	Angela Stanford
Suzann Pettersen	(United States) 1 up	Cristie Kerr
Laura Davies	(Europe) 1 up	Meg Mallon
Elisabeth Esterl	(United States) 5 & 4	Laura Diaz
Mhairi McKay	(Europe) 1 up	Beth Daniel
Patricia Meunier-Lebouc	(Europe) 1 up	Kelly Robbins
8	Session	4
17 1/2	Overall	10 1/2

== Individual player records ==
Each entry refers to the win–loss–half record of the player.

=== Europe ===
Player	Points	Overall	Singles	Foursomes	Fourballs
Laura Davies	1.5	1–2–1	1–0–0	0–0–1	0–2–0
Elisabeth Esterl	1.5	1–1–1	0–1–0	1–0–1	0–0–0
Sophie Gustafson	3	3–2–0	1–0–0	2–0–0	0–2–0
Carin Koch	1.5	1–2–1	0–1–0	1–0–1	0–1–0
Catriona Matthew	3.5	3–1–1	1–0–0	1–0–1	1–1–0
Mhairi McKay	1	1–1–0	1–0–0	0–0–0	0–1–0
Patricia Meunier-Lebouc	2	2–0–0	1–0–0	0–0–0	1–0–0
Janice Moodie	3.5	3–0–1	1–0–0	1–0–1	1–0–0
Suzann Pettersen	4	4–1–0	0–1–0	2–0–0	2–0–0
Ana Belén Sánchez	0	0–2–0	0–1–0	0–0–0	0–1–0
Annika Sörenstam	4	4–1–0	1–0–0	2–0–0	1–1–0
Iben Tinning	1.5	1–1–1	1–0–0	0–0–1	0–1–0

=== United States ===
Player	Points	Overall	Singles	Foursomes	Fourballs
Heather Bowie	0	0–3–0	0–1–0	0–2–0	0–0–0
Beth Daniel	2.5	2–1–1	0–1–0	0–0–1	2–0–0
Laura Diaz	1	1–2–0	1–0–0	0–1–0	0–1–0
Juli Inkster	3	3–1–0	1–0–0	0–1–0	2–0–0
Rosie Jones	1	1–3–0	0–1–0	0–1–0	1–1–0
Cristie Kerr	3	3–1–0	1–0–0	0–1–0	2–0–0
Kelli Kuehne	2	2–2–0	0–1–0	0–1–0	2–0–0
Meg Mallon	0.5	0–3–1	0–1–0	0–1–1	0–1–0
Michele Redman	2.5	2–0–1	1–0–0	0–0–1	1–0–0
Kelly Robbins	1	0–2–2	0–1–0	0–0–2	0–1–0
Angela Stanford	0.5	0–2–1	0–1–0	0–0–1	0–1–0
Wendy Ward	0	0–4–0	0–1–0	0–2–0	0–1–0
