= 2003 European Ladies' Team Championship =

Golf competition

Tournament information
- Dates: 8–12 July 2003
- Location: Frankfurt am Main, Germany; 50°04′20″N 8°37′35″E
- Course: Frankfurter Golf Club
- Organized by: European Golf Association
- Format: 36 holes stroke play Knock-out match-play

Statistics
- Par: 72
- Field: 14 teams 84 players

Champion
- Spain; Carmen Alonso, Nuria Clau, Tania Elósegui, María Hernández, Elisa Serramià, Adriana Zwank
- Qualification round: 709 (−11); Final match 4 1/2–2 1/2
- Location in Europe Location in Germany Location in Hesse

The 2003 European Ladies' Team Championship took place 8–12 July at Frankfurter Golf Club in Frankfurt am Main, Germany. It was the 23rd women's golf amateur European Ladies' Team Championship.

== Venue ==
The hosting Frankfurter Golf Club, one of the oldest golf clubs in Germany, was founded in 1913. The course, situated in Niederrad, 5 kilometres west of the city center of Frankfurt am Main, was designed by Harry Colt and opened in 1927.

The club had previously hosted twelve editions of the German Open during the period 1938–1989, a European Tour tournament since the tour was founded in 1972.

The championship course was set up with par 72.

== Format ==
All participating teams played two qualification rounds of stroke-play with six players, counted the five best scores for each team.

The eight best teams formed flight A, in knock-out match-play over the next three days. The teams were seeded based on their positions after the stroke-play. The first placed team was drawn to play the quarter-final against the eight placed team, the second against the seventh, the third against the sixth and the fourth against the fifth. In each match between two nation teams, two 18-hole foursome games and five 18-hole single games were played. Teams were allowed to switch players during the team matches, selecting other players in to the afternoon single games after the morning foursome games. Games all square after 18 holes were declared halved, if the team match was already decided.

The six teams placed 9–14 in the qualification stroke-play formed flight B, to play similar knock-out match-play, to decide their final positions.

== Teams ==
14 nation teams contested the event. Each team consisted of six players.

Players in the leading teams

Country	Players
Czech Republic	Marta Balkova, Silvie Dittertova, Petra Kvidova, Zuzana Mašínová, Stanislava Kopeitkova, Zuzana Potuznikova
Denmark	Mette Buus, Line Cordes, Lisa Holm Sørensen, Lisbeth Meincke, Mette Randbaek, Julie Tvede
England	Emma Duggleby, Alex Keighley, Danielle Masters, Fame More, Kerry Smith, Nicola Timmins
Finland	Minea Blomqvist, Nina Isaksson, Kaisa Ruuttila, Hanna-Leena Salonen, Ursula Tuutti, Stenna Westerlund
France	Natalie David, Peggy Fraysee, Sophie Giquel, Anne-Sophie Le Nalio, Fanny Schaeffer, Alexandra Vilatte
Germany	Stephanie Döring, Bettina Hauert, Kerstin Honisch, Anja Monke, Pia Odefey, Denise Simon
Ireland	Claire Coughlan, Maria Dunne, Martina Gillen, Helen Jones, Tricia Mangan, Maura Morrin
Italy	Tullia Calzavara, Giuliana Colavito, Giulia Garbaccio, Claire Grignolo, Giusy Paolillo, Margharita Rigon
Netherlands	Myrte Eikenaar, Charlotte Heeres, Joan van der Kraats, Varin Schilperoord, Dewi Claire Schreefel, Marie Louise Weeda
Scotland	Claire Hargan, Lynn Kenny, Anne Laing, Vikki Laing, Lesley MacKay, Claire Queen
Spain	Carmen Alonso, Nuria Clau, Tania Elósegui, María Hernández, Elisa Serramià, Adriana Zwank
Sweden	Sofie Andersson, Karin Börjeskog, Caroline Larsson, Elin Ohlsson, Mikaela Parmlid, Karin Sjödin
Switzerland	Niloufar Aazam, Nora Angehrn, Sheila Lee, Caroline Rominger, Frédérique Seeholzer, Natalia Tanno
Wales	Becky Brewerton, Stephanie Evans, Anna Highgate, Sarah Jones, Kate Phillips, Jo Pritchard

== Winners ==
Team Spain lead the opening 36-hole qualifying competition, with a score of 11 under par 709, one shot ahead of host nation Germany on second place.

Tied individual leaders in the 36-hole stroke-play competition was Tania Elósegui, Spain, and Pia Odefey, Germany, each with a score of 8 under par 136. Karin Sjödin, Sweden, shot a new course record 66 in the second round.

Team Spain won the championship, beating defending champions Sweden 4 1/2–2 1/2 in the final and earned their second title, playing in their fifth final. The win came to be the first of three in a row for Spain. Team France earned third place, beating Wales 4 1/2–2 1/2 in the bronze match.

== Results ==
Qualification round

Team standings

Place	Country	Score	To par
1	Spain	357-352=709	−11
2	Germany	355-355=710	−10
3	England	364-357=721	+1
4	Finland	358-364=722	+2
5	France *	367-359=726	+6
5	Wales	361-365=726	+6
7	Sweden	367-360=727	+7
8	Denmark	365-363=728	+8
9	Netherlands	368-373=741	+21
10	Switzerland	374-368=742	+22
11	Ireland	372-375=747	+27
12	Italy	370-379=749	+29
13	Scotland	374-377=751	+31
14	Czech Republic	399-378=777	+57

* Note: In the event of a tie the order was determined by the better total non-counting scores.

Individual leaders

Place	Player	Country	Score	To par
T1	Tania Elósegui	Spain	68-68=136	−8
T1	Pia Odefey	Germany	69-67=136	−8
T3	Minea Blomqvist	Finland	68-70=138	−6
T3	Anja Monke	Germany	69-69=138	−6
T3	Karin Sjödin	Sweden	72-66=138	−6
T7	Anna Highgate	Wales	69-70=139	−5
T7	Lisa Holm Sørensen	Denmark	69-70=139	−5
T8	Carmen Alonso	Spain	73-68=141	−3
T8	Charlotte Heeres	Netherlands	70-71=141	−3
T8	Dewi Claire Schreefel	Netherlands	70-71=141	−3

Note: There was no official award for the lowest individual score.

Flight A

Bracket

Quarter finals
Sweden	6
Germany	1
Wales	4
England	3
France	4
Finland	3
Spain	5
Denmark	2

Semi finals
Sweden	5
Wales	2
Spain	6
France	1

Final
Spain	4.5
Sweden	2.5
Bronze match
France	4.5
Wales	2.5

Elimination matches
Denmark	4
Finland	3
Germany	5
England	2

Match for 5th place
Germany	5
Denmark	2
Match for 7th place
England	4.5
Finland	2.5

Final games

Spain	Sweden
4.5	2.5
Clau / Serramiá 4 & 2	Börjeskog / Parmlid
Alonso / Elósegui	Andersson / Sjödin 5 & 4
Nuria Clau 4 & 3	Elin Ohlsson
Adriana Zwank	Karin Börjeskog 20th hole
Carmen Alonso 2 & 1	Mikaela Parmlid
Elisia Serramiá 19th hole	Sofie Andersson
Tania Elósegui AS *	Karin Sjödin AS *

* Note: Game all square after 18 holes declared halved, since team match already decided.

Flight B

Bracket

Round 1
Ireland	4
Czech Republic	3
Scotland	5
Italy	2

Round 2
Ireland	4.5
Switzerland	2.5
Scotland	4
Netherlands	3

Match for 9th place
Ireland	4.5
Scotland	2.5
Match for 11th place
Netherlands	4
Switzerland	3

Round 1

Match for 13th place
Italy	5
Czech Republic	2

Final standings

Place	Country
1st place, gold medalist(s)	Spain
2nd place, silver medalist(s)	Sweden
3rd place, bronze medalist(s)	France
4	Wales
5	Germany
6	Denmark
7	England
8	Finland
9	Ireland
10	Scotland
11	Netherlands
12	Switzerland
13	Italy
14	Czech Republic

== See also ==
- Espirito Santo Trophy – biennial world amateur team golf championship for women organized by the International Golf Federation.
- European Amateur Team Championship – European amateur team golf championship for men organised by the European Golf Association.
