= 2000 Ladies European Tour =

Golf tournament series

2000 Ladies European Tour season
- Duration: January 2000 – December 2000
- Number of official events: 16
- Order of Merit: (Sweden) Sophie Gustafson
- Player of the Year: (Sweden) Sophie Gustafson
- Rookie of the Year: (Italy) Giulia Sergas
- Lowest stroke average: (Sweden) Sophie Gustafson

The 2000 Ladies European Tour was a series of golf tournaments for elite female golfers from around the world which took place from January through December 2000. The tournaments were sanctioned by the Ladies European Tour (LET).

== Tournaments ==
The table below shows the 2000 schedule. The numbers in brackets after the winners' names show the number of career wins they had on the Ladies European Tour up to and including that event. This is only shown for members of the tour.

| Date | Name | Venue | Location | Winner | Notes |
|---|---|---|---|---|---|
| 20 Feb | AAMI Women's Australian Open | Yarra Yarra Golf Club | Australia | (Australia) Karrie Webb (3) | Co-sanctioned by the ALPG Tour |
| 21 Mar | Ladies Italian Open | Poggio dei Medici | Italy | (Sweden) Sophie Gustafson (4) | |
| 28 May | Ladies Hannover Expo 2000 Open | Rethmar Golf Links | Germany | (Australia) Alison Munt (1) | |
| 4 Jun | Chrysler Open | Halmstad GK | Sweden | (Sweden) Carin Koch (1) | |
| 11 Jun | Waterford Crystal Ladies' Irish Open | Faithlegg Golf Club | Ireland | (Sweden) Sophie Gustafson (5) | |
| 17 Jun | **Evian Masters** | Evian Masters Golf Club | France | (Sweden) Annika Sörenstam (6) | |
| 2 Jul | Ladies French Open | Le Golf d'Arras | France | (France) Patricia Meunier-Lebouc (4) | |
| 9 Jul | stilwerk Ladies German Open | Treudelberg GCC | Germany | (England) Joanne Morley (2) | |
| 15 Jul | Ladies Austrian Open | Steiermarksischer GC Murhof | Austria | (France) Patricia Meunier-Lebouc (5) | |
| 6 Aug | The Daily Telegraph Ladies British Masters | Mottram Hall | England | (England) Trish Johnson (13) | |
| 20 Aug | **Weetabix Women's British Open** | Royal Birkdale Golf Club | England | (Sweden) Sophie Gustafson (6) | Co-sanctioned by the LPGA Tour |
| 27 Aug | Compaq Open | Barsebäck Golf & Country Club | Sweden | (United States) Juli Inkster (n/a) | |
| 2 Sep | Kronenbourg 1664 Chart Hills Classic | Chart Hills Golf Club, Biddenden | England | (New Zealand) Gina Marie Scott (1) | |
| 17 Sep | TSN Ladies World Cup Golf | Adare Golf Club | Ireland | (England) Laura Davies (32); Sweden (Carin Koch & Sophie Gustafson) | Team event; unofficial |
| 24 Sep | Mexx Sport Open | Kennemer Golf & Country Club | Netherlands | (Germany) Tina Fischer (2) | |
| 15 Oct | Marrakech Palmeraie Open | Palmeraie Golf Palace | Morocco | (Australia) Alison Munt (2) | |

Major championships in bold.

== Order of Merit rankings ==
| Rank | Player | Country | Points |
|---|---|---|---|
| 1 | Sophie Gustafson | Sweden | 8,777.17 |
| 2 | Trish Johnson | Spain | 5,312.45 |
| 3 | Marine Monnet | France | 5,130.62 |
| 4 | Alison Munt | Australia | 4,300.58 |
| 5 | Patricia Meunier-Lebouc | France | 4,269.44 |
| 6 | Raquel Carriedo | Spain | 4,234.53 |
| 7 | Kirsty Taylor | England | 3,875.67 |
| 8 | Valérie Van Ryckeghem | Belgium | 3,574.29 |
| 9 | Alison Nicholas | England | 2,953.74 |
| 10 | Samantha Head | England | 2,604.81 |

== See also ==
- 2000 LPGA Tour
