= Celeste Troche =

Paraguayan professional golfer (born 1981

Personal information
- Nationality: Paraguay
- Born: 13 February 1981 (age 45) Asunción, Paraguay
- Height: 5 ft 9 in (1.75 m)

Career
- Sport: Golf
- College: Auburn University
- Turned professional: 2003
- Former tours: LPGA Tour (2004–2006); Futures Tour (2003–2007)
- Professional wins: 1

Best results in LPGA major championships
- Chevron Championship: DNP
- Women's PGA C'ship: CUT: 2005
- U.S. Women's Open: CUT: 2001, 2005, 2006
- Women's British Open: DNP

Celeste Troche (pronounced "say-LESS-tay TROH-chay") (born 13 February 1981) is a Paraguayan professional golfer.

== Early life and amateur career ==
In 1981, Troche was born in Asunción. She attended Auburn University in the United States, and was a two time All-American. She was also the 2001 SEC-ACC Shootout winner.

She was the co-medalist at the 2001 U.S. Women's Amateur.

== Professional career ==
In 2003, Troche turned professional and has played on the LPGA Tour since then but has struggled to hold on to full LPGA Tour status so she has had to spend time on the Futures Tour. In 2007, Troche and her Paraguay team partner Julieta Granada won the Women's World Cup of Golf.

She graduated from Springwood School and returned to teach Spanish in later years.

== Awards and honors ==
- In 2000, she earned Southeastern Conference (SEC) Freshman of the Year.
- In 2001, Troche earned SEC Player of the Year honors.

== Amateur wins ==
- 2001 Trans-National Championship winner

== Professional wins ==
- 2007 Women's World Cup of Golf winner (with Julieta Granada)

== Team appearances ==
Amateur

- Espirito Santo Trophy (representing Paraguay): 1998

Professional

- World Cup (representing Paraguay): 2007 (winners), 2008
