= 2005 Solheim Cup =

Women's team golf competition

- Dates: September 9–11, 2005
- Venue: Crooked Stick Golf Club
- Location: Carmel, Indiana
- Captains: Nancy Lopez (USA); Catrin Nilsmark (Europe)
(United States)	15 1/2	12 1/2	(Europe)
- United States wins the Solheim Cup

Location map
- Location within the United States Location within Indiana

The 9th Solheim Cup Match was held September 9–11, 2005 at Crooked Stick Golf Club, Carmel, Indiana, a suburb north of Indianapolis. The United States won the trophy for the sixth time by a score of 15 1/2 to 12 1/2 points. The winning point was gained by Meg Mallon in her win over Karen Stupples.

== Teams ==
The European team consisted of seven automatic qualifiers and five wild card picks from Captain Catrin Nilsmark. The US team consisted of 10 automatic qualifiers and two picks from Captain Nancy Lopez.

Europe

- Captain
  - Catrin Nilsmark - Gothenburg, Sweden
- Assistant Captain
  - Alison Nicholas - Birmingham, England
- Automatic qualifiers
  - Annika Sörenstam - Stockholm, Sweden
  - Laura Davies - Coventry, England
  - Ludivine Kreutz - Rognac, France
  - Maria Hjorth - Falun, Sweden
  - Iben Tinning - Copenhagen, Denmark
  - Trish Johnson - Bristol, England
  - Gwladys Nocera - Moulins, France
- Captains Picks
  - Carin Koch - Kungalv, Sweden
  - Catriona Matthew - North Berwick, Scotland
  - Suzann Pettersen - Oslo, Norway
  - Sophie Gustafson - Särö, Sweden
  - Karen Stupples - Dover, England

United States

- Captain
  - Nancy Lopez - Torrance, California
- Assistant Captain
  - Donna Caponi - Tampa, Florida
- Automatic qualifiers
  - Cristie Kerr - Miami, Florida
  - Meg Mallon - Natick, Massachusetts
  - Juli Inkster - Santa Cruz, California
  - Rosie Jones - Santa Ana, California
  - Pat Hurst - San Leandro, California
  - Natalie Gulbis - Sacramento, California
  - Christina Kim - San Jose, California
  - Paula Creamer - Pleasanton, California
  - Michele Redman - Zanesville, Ohio
  - Laura Diaz - Scotia, New York
- Captains Picks
  - Wendy Ward - San Antonio, Texas
  - Beth Daniel - Charleston, South Carolina

== Format ==
Location in the United States

The match format was the same as for 2003. A total of 28 points were available, divided among four periods of team play, followed by one period of singles play. The first period, on Friday morning, was four rounds of foursomes. This was followed in the afternoon by four rounds of fourballs. This schedule was repeated on the Saturday morning and afternoon. The four periods on Friday and Saturday accounted for 16 points. During these team periods, the players played in teams of two. All players had to play in at least one session of the first two days . The final 12 points were decided in a round of singles matchplay, in which all 24 players (12 from each team) took part.

== Day one ==
Friday, September 9, 2005

=== Morning foursomes ===
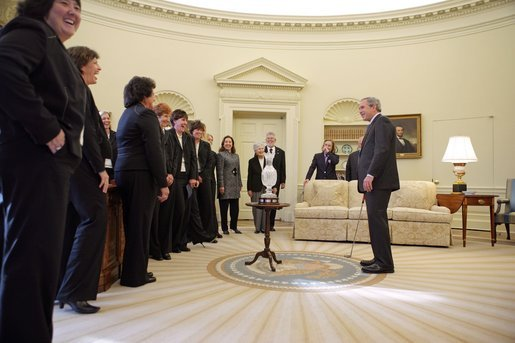
The U.S. team visiting the White House in January 2006

The 2005 Solheim Cup trophy, designed by Waterford Crystal.

At one point in the morning foursomes it looked like the US team would take a 3–1 lead but the European team staged a major fightback and finished the morning session with a 3–1 lead themselves. In the first match Catriona Matthew and Carin Koch were two down with four to play, playing against Paula Creamer and Beth Daniel, the youngest and oldest participants in the Solheim Cup, but they managed to win the 15th and 17th holes to halve the match. In match three the Europeans snatched another unlikely half point when Sophie Gustafson and Trish Johnson won three holes in a row - the 15th and 17th to come back from three down with four to play against rookie Christina Kim and veteran Pat Hurst.

The turnaround in the bottom match was even bigger where Suzann Pettersen and world no.1 Annika Sörenstam were four down after 12 holes. Sörenstam lipped out her tee shot on the par three 13th starting a run of five consecutive winning holes to complete a 1 up win over Michele Redman and Laura Diaz. Europe dominated the second match from the start with Laura Davies and Maria Hjorth going three up after six holes against Cristie Kerr and Natalie Gulbis finishing with a 2 and 1 victory.

	Results
Koch/Matthew	halved	Daniel/Creamer
Davies/Hjorth	(Europe) 2 & 1	Kerr/Gulbis
Gustafson/Johnson	halved	Kim/Hurst
Sörenstam/Pettersen	(Europe) 1 up	Redman/Diaz
3	Session	1
3	Overall	1

=== Afternoon fourball ===
Europe and America shared the points in the afternoon fourballs giving the European team a 5–3 lead at the end of day one, this being only their second first day lead in the nine match series. In the first match of the day Meg Mallon and Rosie Jones won three of the first four holes with Jones making five birdies in her first seven holes. giving them a 3 and 2 win over Iben Tinning and Maria Hjorth. The US also won match two with US rookie Natalie Gulbis and Cristie Kerr going two up after four holes against Sophie Gustafson and European rookie Karen Stupples and never losing the lead, winning 2 and 1.

Europe won both the third and fourth matches. In match three Catriona Matthew and Annika Sörenstam went two down to Pat Hurst and Wendy Ward after eight holes but Sörenstam then birdied the 9th, 10th, 12th, 14th and 15th to help earn a 2 and 1 win. In the bottom match Laura Davies was six under par for the 15 holes that she and Suzann Pettersen played in beating Juli Inkster and Paula Creamer by 4 and 3.

	Results
Hjorth/Tinning	(United States) 3 & 2	Jones/Mallon
Gustafson/Stupples	(United States) 2 & 1	Kerr/Gulbis
Sörenstam/Matthew	(Europe) 2 & 1	Hurst/Ward
Davies/Pettersen	(Europe) 4 & 3	Creamer/Inkster
2	Session	2
5	Overall	3

== Day two ==
Saturday, September 10, 2005

=== Morning foursomes ===
America staged a fighting comeback in the morning foursomes gaining three out of the four available points to tie the scores at 6-6. The first match of the day featured four Solheim Cup rookies. The all-French pairing of Ludivine Kreutz and Gwladys Nocera, making their Solheim Cup debut, lost three holes from the second and were eventually beaten 4 and 2 by Natalie Gulbis and Christina Kim. In the second match veteran Juli Inkster teamed with rookie Paula Creamer to beat the in form Laura Davies and Maria Hjorth 3 and 2.

The third match saw the only victorious European team. The Swedes Carin Koch and Sophie Gustafson won four straight holes at the turn and gained a 5-and-3 victory over Laura Diaz and Wendy Ward. In the bottom match Michele Redman, who was a late replacement after Cristie Kerr suffered a stiff neck, and Pat Hurst were three down after five holes playing Catriona Matthew and Annika Sörenstam, but staged a comeback and won 1 up when Sörenstam hit her tee shot into the water at the 18th.

	Results
Nocera/Kreutz	(United States) 4 & 2	Kim/Gulbis
Davies/Hjorth	(United States) 3 & 2	Creamer/Inkster
Gustafson/Koch	(Europe) 5 & 3	Diaz/Ward
Sörenstam/Matthew	(United States) 1 up	Redman/Hurst
1	Session	3
6	Overall	6

=== Afternoon fourball ===
The top three fourballs all came down to the final hole. In the top match Trish Johnson and Iben Tinning were 1 down with two to play against Beth Daniel and Juli Inkster. Johnson made a winning eight foot birdie at the 17th and Tinning hit her approach on 18 within 5 feet (1.5 m) of the flag. She missed the birdie chance and the teams had to settle for a half.

Match two saw Meg Mallon and Rosie Jones playing Sophie Gustafson and Suzann Pettersen. All square playing 18, Pettersen put pressure on her partner by driving into the water but Gustafson hit her approach to six feet. Jones made a 30-footer for birdie and the pressure was put on Gustafson who responded with a birdie putt to conclude the match with a half.

In match three Carin Koch, playing with Catriona Matthew, made three birdies in her first three holes which meant a 3-up lead for the Europeans. Paula Creamer birdied the fourth and fifth and Cristie Kerr made par on eight and the match was even. Playing 18 all square Koch drove into the water, Matthew found the rough and Creamer made a three-foot putt to win a full point.

Match four saw the Solheim Cup leading points scorers, Laura Davies and Annika Sörenstam, playing together for the first time against Pat Hurst and Christina Kim. Sörenstam made a 10-foot (3.0 m) birdie putt at the first and the Europeans also won the second and the sixth. The Americans got one back at eight, but Sörenstam sank an 8-foot (2.4 m) eagle putt at the ninth to go 3-up. The Europeans won the next two holes to move 5-up, but Hurst and Kim won the 13th and 15th holes but when neither American could birdie 16, the match went to the European side 4 & 2.

The score was thus tied with the 12 Sunday singles left, marking the first time since 1994 that the matches were tied after the opening two days.

	Results
Tinning/Johnson	halved	Daniel/Inkster
Gustafson/Pettersen	halved	Jones/Mallon
Koch/Matthew	(United States) 1 up	Kerr/Creamer
Davies/Sörenstam	(Europe) 4 & 2	Kim/Hurst
2	Session	2
8	Overall	8

== Day three ==
Sunday, September 11, 2005

=== Singles ===
The U.S. team got a good start winning the first five matches. Juli Inkster was 1 down with 6 to play but won three holes in a row from the 13th to beat Sophie Gustafson, 2&1 in the opening match and Paula Creamer beat Laura Davies 7&5 in the second with 7 birdies in 13 holes. Pat Hurst won three in a row from 14 to beat Trish Johnson 2&1, in the first ever match between 2 pregnant players Laura Diaz beat Iben Tinning 6&5, and rookie Christina Kim got a 5&4 win over Ludivine Kreutz.

Annika Sörenstam won the first point for the Europeans with a 4&3 win over Beth Daniel in the match six whilst Natalie Gulbis made it six points for the US with a 3&1 win over Maria Hjorth. Then followed a European rally. Catriona Matthew won four out of five holes on the back nine beating Wendy Ward 3&2, Carin Koch won three in a row to beat Michele Redman 2&1 and in an upset, rookie Gwladys Nocera defeated Cristie Kerr 2&1.

It fell to Meg Mallon in the penultimate match to gain the point necessary for the US to win the cup with a 3&1 victory over Karen Stupples whilst Suzann Pettersen and Rosie Jones halved the final dead rubber to give the US team a victory 15 1/2–12 1/2.

	Results
Sophie Gustafson	(United States) 2 & 1	Juli Inkster
Laura Davies	(United States) 7 & 5	Paula Creamer
Trish Johnson	(United States) 2 & 1	Pat Hurst
Iben Tinning	(United States) 6 & 5	Laura Diaz
Ludivine Kreutz	(United States) 5 & 4	Christina Kim
Annika Sörenstam	(Europe) 4 & 3	Beth Daniel
Maria Hjorth	(United States) 2 & 1	Natalie Gulbis
Catriona Matthew	(Europe) 3 & 2	Wendy Ward
Carin Koch	(Europe) 2 & 1	Michele Redman
Gwladys Nocera	(Europe) 2 & 1	Cristie Kerr
Karen Stupples	(United States) 3 & 1	Meg Mallon
Suzann Pettersen	halved	Rosie Jones
4 1/2	Session	7 1/2
12 1/2	Overall	15 1/2

== Individual player records ==
Each entry refers to the win–loss–half record of the player.

=== United States ===
Player	Points	Overall	Singles	Foursomes	Fourballs
Paula Creamer	3.5	3–1–1	1–0–0	1–0–1	1–1–0
Beth Daniel	1	0–1–2	0–1–0	0–0–1	0–0–1
Laura Diaz	1	1–2–0	1–0–0	0–2–0	0–0–0
Natalie Gulbis	3	3–1–0	1–0–0	1–1–0	1–0–0
Pat Hurst	2.5	2–2–1	1–0–0	1–0–1	0–2–0
Juli Inkster	2.5	2–1–1	1–0–0	1–0–0	0–1–1
Rosie Jones	2	1–0–2	0–0–1	0–0–0	1–0–1
Cristie Kerr	2	2–2–0	0–1–0	0–1–0	2–0–0
Christina Kim	2.5	2–1–1	1–0–0	1–0–1	0–1–0
Meg Mallon	2.5	2–0–1	1–0–0	0–0–0	1–0–1
Michele Redman	1	1–2–0	0–1–0	1–1–0	0–0–0
Wendy Ward	0	0–3–0	0–1–0	0–1–0	0–1–0

=== Europe ===
Player	Points	Overall	Singles	Foursomes	Fourballs
Laura Davies	3	3–2–0	0–1–0	1–1–0	2–0–0
Sophie Gustafson	2	1–2–2	0–1–0	1–0–1	0–1–1
Maria Hjorth	1	1–3–0	0–1–0	1–1–0	0–1–0
Trish Johnson	1	0–1–2	0–1–0	0–0–1	0–0–1
Carin Koch	2.5	2–1–1	1–0–0	1–0–1	0–1–0
Ludivine Kreutz	0	0–2–0	0–1–0	0–1–0	0–0–0
Catriona Matthew	2.5	2–2–1	1–0–0	0–1–1	1–1–0
Gwladys Nocera	1	1–1–0	1–0–0	0–1–0	0–0–0
Suzann Pettersen	3	2–0–2	0–0–1	1–0–0	1–0–1
Annika Sörenstam	4	4–1–0	1–0–0	1–1–0	2–0–0
Karen Stupples	0	0–2–0	0–1–0	0–0–0	0–1–0
Iben Tinning	0.5	0–2–1	0–1–0	0–0–0	0–1–1
