= Stéphanie Arricau =

French professional golfer (born 1973)

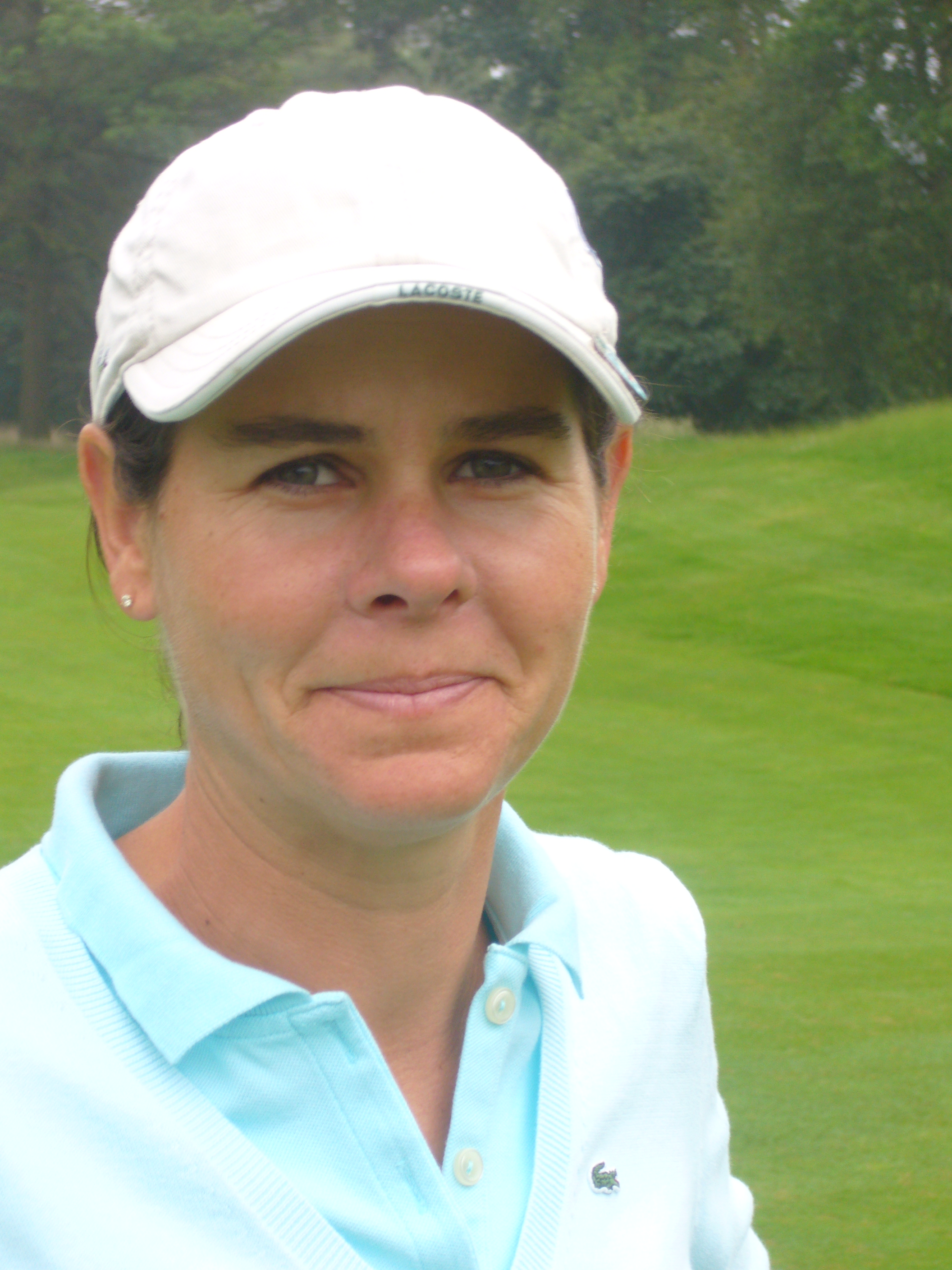

Personal information
- Nationality: France
- Born: 14 June 1973 (age 53) Orthez, France
- Height: 1.60 m (5 ft 3 in)

Career
- Sport: Golf
- Turned professional: 1999
- Former tours: Ladies European Tour (2000-2008); LPGA Tour (2005)
- Professional wins: 4

Number of wins by tour
- Ladies European Tour: 4

Best results in LPGA major championships
- Chevron Championship: T68: 2005
- Women's PGA C'ship: CUT: 2005
- U.S. Women's Open: CUT: 2005
- Women's British Open: CUT: 2002, 2003, 2004, 2006

Achievements and awards
- Ladies European Tour Player of the Year: 2004

Stéphanie Arricau (born 14 June 1973 in Orthez) is a French professional golfer. She studied marketing and management and had a long amateur career as a junior and an adult before turning professional at the age of 26. She has played on the Ladies European Tour since 2000, winning the Unión Fenosa Open de España Femenino and the Arras Open de France Dames in 2004 and the KLM Ladies Dutch Open and the Estoril Ladies Open of Portugal in 2006. She was a member of the U.S.-based LPGA Tour in 2005, but failed to retain her card. She represented France in the 2005 and 2007 Women's World Cup of Golf.

== Professional wins (4) ==
=== Ladies European Tour wins (4) ===
- 2004 Unión Fenosa Open de España Femenino, Arras Open de France Dames
- 2006 KLM Ladies Open, Estoril Ladies Open of Portugal

== Team appearances ==
Amateur

- European Ladies' Team Championship (representing France): 1997, 1999 (winners)
- Espirito Santo Trophy (representing France): 1998

Professional

- World Cup (representing France): 2005, 2007
