= Smådalarö Gård Open =

Tournament information
- Location: Stockholm, Sweden
- Established: 2005
- Course(s): Smådalarö Gård
- Par: 72
- Tour(s): Swedish Golf Tour
- Format: 36-hole stableford
- Prize fund: SEK 300,000
- Final year: 2012

Final champion
- (Sweden) Emelie Lind

The Smådalarö Gård Open was a women's professional golf tournament on the Swedish Golf Tour, played between 2005 and 2012. It was always held at Smådalarö Gård near Stockholm, Sweden.

== Winners ==
Year	Winner	Runner-up	Prize fund (SEK)	Ref
2012	(Sweden) Emelie Lind	(Sweden) Nathalie Månsson	300,000	
2011	(Sweden) Johanna Johansson	(Sweden) Maria Ohlsson	200,000	
2010	(Sweden) Madeleine Augustsson	(Sweden) Elin Ohlsson	300,000	
2009	(Sweden) Karin Börjeskog	(Sweden) Åsa Gottmo (Sweden) Lisa Hed	300,000	
2008	(Sweden) Johanna Lundberg	(Sweden) Josefin Leijon	300,000	
2007	(Norway) Marianne Skarpnord	(Switzerland) Florence Lüscher	150,000	
2006	(Sweden) Anna Tybring	(Sweden) Emelie Leijon	100,000	
2005	(Sweden) Anna Tybring	(Sweden) Nina Reis	100,000	
