= Ana Sánchez =

Spanish golfer (born 1976)

Personal information
- Full name: Ana Belén Sánchez
- Nationality: Spain
- Born: 16 February 1976 (age 50) Málaga, Spain
- Height: 1.66 m (5 ft 5 in)

Career
- Sport: Golf
- Turned professional: 1997
- Current tour: Ladies European Tour
- Professional wins: 2

Number of wins by tour
- Ladies European Tour: 1

Best results in LPGA major championships
- Chevron Championship: CUT: 2004
- Women's PGA C'ship: DNP
- U.S. Women's Open: DNP
- du Maurier Classic: DNP
- Women's British Open: T42: 2004
Medal record
Mediterranean Games
Bronze medal – third place	1997 Bari	Women's team

Ana Belén Sánchez (born 16 February 1976) is a Spanish golfer who plays on the Ladies European Tour.

== Career ==
Sanchez represented Spain in the 1996 Espirito Santo Trophy and turned professional the following year. She has one Ladies European Tour win, which came at the 2004 BMW Ladies Italian Open, and was a member of the European team at the 2003 Solheim Cup.

== Professional wins (2) ==
=== Ladies European Tour wins (1) ===
- 2004 BMW Ladies Italian Open

=== Other wins (1) ===
- 2005 Lalla Meryem Cup

== Team appearances ==
Amateur

- European Girls' Team Championship (representing Spain): 1993 (winners)
- European Ladies' Team Championship (representing Spain): 1995 (winners), 1997
- Espirito Santo Trophy (representing Spain): 1996

Professional

- Solheim Cup (representing Europe): 2003 (winners)
- World Cup (representing Spain): 2005, 2007
