= Veronica Zorzi =

Italian professional golfer (born 1980)

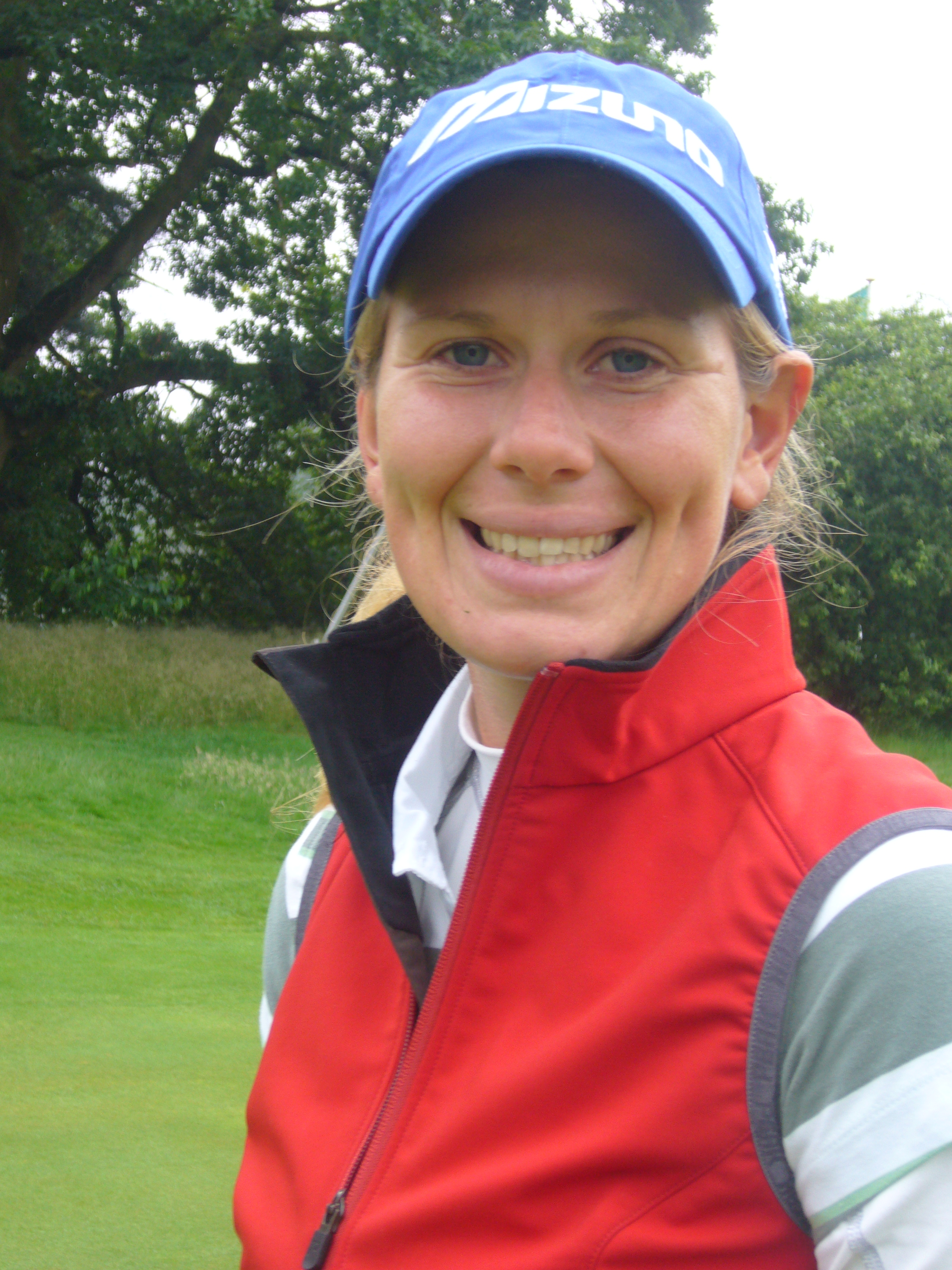

Personal information
- Nationality: Italy
- Born: 20 October 1980 (age 46) Verona, Italy
- Height: 1.75 m (5 ft 9 in)

Career
- Sport: Golf
- Turned professional: 2000
- Current tour: Ladies European Tour (joined 2001)
- Professional wins: 2

Number of wins by tour
- Ladies European Tour: 2

Best results in LPGA major championships
- Chevron Championship: T19: 2006
- Women's PGA C'ship: DNP
- U.S. Women's Open: CUT: 2006
- Women's British Open: T36: 2006
- Evian Championship: DNP

Veronica Zorzi (born 20 October 1980) is an Italian professional golfer.

== Career ==
In 1980, Zorzi was born in Verona.

In 2000, Zorzi turned professional. She joined the Ladies European Tour (LET) in 2001. She won her first LET title in 2005 at the Vediorbis Open de France Dames, and she ended that year third on the LET Order of Merit. She successfully defended her Open de France title in 2006.

== Professional wins (2) ==
=== Ladies European Tour wins (2) ===
- 2005 Vediorbis Open de France Dames
- 2006 Vediorbis Open de France Dames

== Team appearances ==
Amateur

- Espirito Santo Trophy (representing Italy): 2000

Professional

- World Cup (representing Italy): 2006, 2007
