= Tenerife Women's Open =

Golf tournament on the Ladies European Tour

Tournament information
- Location: Tenerife, Canary Islands, Spain
- Established: 2002
- Course: Abama Golf
- Par: 72
- Tour: Ladies European Tour
- Format: Stroke play
- Prize fund: €500,000
- Month played: June

Tournament record score
- Aggregate: 274 Trish Johnson, Felicity Johnson
- To par: −14 as above

Current champion
- (Czech Republic) Sára Kousková

Final champion
- Location in Location in Tenerife Canary Islands

The Tenerife Women's Open is a women's professional golf tournament on the Ladies European Tour, held on the Spanish island of Tenerife. It was first played in 2002.

== History ==
A 72-hole stroke play event was played annually from 2002 to 2010. In 2011, the format was modified in to a hybrid of stroke and match play. The results from the pro-am set the seeding for the field of 32, then two rounds of match play to reduce to eight finalists, with a final round of stroke play.

Following a hiatus, the event returned to the LET schedule in 2025, held at Abama Golf, a venue last played in 2006.

The LET also visited Tenerife for the Open de España Femenino in 2012 (Las Américas) and 2014 (Adeje).

== Winners ==
Year	Date	Winner	Country	Score	To par	Margin of victory	Runner(s)-up	Winner's share (€)	Venue
Tenerife Women's Open
2025	8 Jun	Sára Kousková	Czech Republic	280	−9	1 stroke	(Germany) Helen Briem	75,000	Abama Golf
2012–2024: No tournament
Tenerife Ladies Match Play
2011	12 Jun	Becky Brewerton	Wales	68 (Note: Hybrid of stroke and match play format)	−4	1 stroke	(Spain) Carlota Ciganda	40,000	Golf Las Américas
2011	12 Jun	Becky Brewerton	Wales	68	−4	1 stroke	(Australia) Nikki Garrett	40,000	Golf Las Américas
Tenerife Ladies Open
2010	4 Jul	Trish Johnson	England	274	−14	1 stroke	(France) Virginie Lagoutte-Clément	41,250	Buenavista Golf Club
2009	27 Sep	Felicity Johnson	England	274	−14	2 strokes	(Wales) Becky Brewerton	45,000	Golf Costa Adeje
2008	22 Jun	Rebecca Hudson	England	278	−10	Playoff	(France) Anne-Lise Caudal	45,000	Golf Costa Adeje
2007	6 May	Nikki Garrett	Australia	287	−1	2 strokes	(England) Trish Johnson	41,250	Golf del Sur
2007	6 May	Nikki Garrett	Australia	287	−1	2 strokes	(Spain) Tania Elósegui	41,250	Golf del Sur
2006	30 Apr	Riikka Hakkarainen	Finland	288	E	2 strokes	(Spain) Tania Elósegui	37,500	Abama Golf
2005	10 Apr	Ludivine Kreutz	France	277	−11	2 strokes	(Germany) Miriam Nagl	36,300	Golf Costa Adeje
2004	2 May	Diana Luna	Italy	279	−9	2 strokes	(Wales) Becky Brewerton	33,000	Buenavista Golf Club
2003	4 May	Elisabeth Esterl	Germany	276	−12	1 stroke	(Wales) Becky Brewerton	30,000	Golf Las Américas
2002	5 May	Raquel Carriedo	Spain	292	+4	1 stroke	(England) Johanna Head	30,000	Golf del Sur
