= Elisabeth Esterl =

German professional golfer

Personal information
- Nationality: Germany
- Born: 29 August 1976 (age 50) Dingolfing, Germany
- Height: 1.68 m (5 ft 6 in)

Career
- Sport: Golf
- Turned professional: 1997
- Current tour: Ladies European Tour (joined 1997)
- Professional wins: 3

Number of wins by tour
- Ladies European Tour: 2
- Other: 1

Best results in LPGA major championships
- Chevron Championship: CUT: 2004
- Women's PGA C'ship: DNP
- U.S. Women's Open: CUT: 2000, 2002, 2004
- du Maurier Classic: DNP
- Women's British Open: T26: 2002

Elisabeth Esterl (born 29 August 1976) is a German professional golfer.

== Career ==
In 1976, Esterl was born in Dingolfing.

In 1997, Esterl turned professional. She joined the Ladies European Tour (LET) soon afterwards. She has won two LET tournaments: the 2003 Tenerife Ladies Open and the 2004 KLM Ladies Open. Her best year was 2003, when she finished second on the LET Order of Merit and played for Europe in the Solheim Cup.

== Professional wins (3) ==
=== Ladies European Tour wins (2) ===
- 2003 Tenerife Ladies Open
- 2004 KLM Ladies Open

=== Other wins (1) ===
- 2000 Princess Lalla Meryem Cup

== Team appearances ==
Amateur

- European Ladies' Team Championship (representing Germany): 1995, 1997
- Espirito Santo Trophy (representing Germany): 1996

Professional

- Solheim Cup (representing Europe): 2003 (winners)
- World Cup (representing Germany): 2005
