= Cecilia Ekelundh =

Swedish professional golfer

Personal information
- Nationality: Sweden
- Born: 19 February 1978 (age 48) Karlskrona, Sweden
- Height: 5 ft 8 in (1.73 m)

Career
- Sport: Golf
- College: University of Tulsa; University of South Carolina
- Turned professional: 2000
- Former tours: LPGA Tour (2006); Ladies European Tour (2002-2009)
- Professional wins: 4

Number of wins by tour
- Ladies European Tour: 3
- Other: 1

Best results in LPGA major championships
- Chevron Championship: CUT: 2006
- Women's PGA C'ship: DNP
- U.S. Women's Open: DNP
- Women's British Open: T22: 2005

Achievements and awards
- Sweden PGA Rookie of the Year: 2000
- Volvo Cross Country Challenge: 2005

Cecilia Ekelundh (born 19 February 1978) is a Swedish professional golfer.

== Career ==
She turned professional in 2000 and was a Ladies European Tour (LET) rookie in 2002.

She finished runner-up at the 2003 Gefle Ladies Open on the Swedish Golf Tour.

She won on the LET for the first time at the 2004 Ladies Open of Portugal. In 2005, she successfully defended that title and also won the inaugural 2005 Volvo Cross Country Challenge, a separate dedicated order of merit containing four events in the Nordic region on the Ladies European Tour. In 2006, she captured her third professional title at the Ladies' English Open.

== Professional wins (5) ==
=== Ladies European Tour wins (3) ===
No.	Date	Tournament	Winning score	Margin of victory	Runner-up
1	9 May 2004	Ladies Open of Portugal	−10 (67-72-67=206)	3 strokes	(Sweden) Linda Wessberg
2	26 Jun 2005	Algarve Ladies Open of Portugal	−6 (77-66-67=210)	3 strokes	(France) Ludivine Kreutz
3	8 Oct 2006	Ladies English Open	−6 (71-69-70=210)	1 stroke	(Germany) Martina Eberl

=== Swedish Golf Tour wins (1) ===
- 2006 Ekerum Ladies Masters

=== Other wins (1) ===
- 2012 Sportlife Open +18 Tour Allerum GC (SGF Golf Ranking)
