= Norwegian Ladies Masters =

SAS Ladies Masters
Tournament information
- Location: Norway
- Established: 2002
- Course: Larvik Golf Club (2009)
- Tour: Ladies European Tour
- Format: Stroke play
- Prize fund: €200,000
- Final year: 2009

Tournament record score
- Aggregate: 203 Gwladys Nocera (2008)
- To par: −13 as above

Final champion
- (Italy) Diana Luna

The SAS Ladies Masters was a women's professional golf tournament on the Ladies European Tour. It was played in Norway between 2002 and 2009, in July or August each year.

The tournament was the first LET event to be held in Norway. Scandinavian Airlines (SAS) became title sponsor in 2006. It was a constituent of the Volvo Cross Country Challenge.

== Winners ==
Year	Venue	Winner	Country	Score	To par	Margin of victory	Runner-up	Purse (€)	Note
SAS Ladies Masters
2009	Larvik	Diana Luna	Italy	207	−12	1 strokes	(Spain) Laura Cabanillas	200,000	
SAS Masters
2008	Haga	Gwladys Nocera	France	203	−13	3 strokes	(Spain) Tania Elósegui (England) Samantha Head	200,000	
2007	Losby	Suzann Pettersen	Norway	204	−12	9 strokes	(Australia) Nikki Garrett	200,000	
2006	Oslo	Laura Davies	England	205	−11	6 strokes	(Belgium) Ellen Smets	200,000	
2003–05: No tournament
P4 Norwegian Masters
2002	Oslo	Laura Davies	England	283	−5	Playoff	(Spain) Ana Larraneta		

== See also ==
- Ladies Norwegian Open
