= Ladies Hannover Expo 2000 Open =

Tournament information
- Location: Hannover, Germany
- Established: 1999
- Course: Rethmar Golf Links
- Par: 72
- Tour: Ladies European Tour
- Format: 54-hole Stroke play
- Prize fund: £100,000
- Final year: 2000

Tournament record score
- Aggregate: 208 Sandrine Mendiburu (1999)
- To par: −8 Sandrine Mendiburu (1999)

Final champion
- (Australia) Alison Munt

The Ladies Hannover Expo 2000 Open was a women's professional golf tournament on the Ladies European Tour that took place at Rethmar Golf Links in Germany.

== Winners ==
Year	Dates	Winner	Country	Score	To par	Margin of victory	Runner-up	Note
2000	26–28 May	Alison Munt	Australia	212	−4	1 stroke	(Belgium) Valérie Van Ryckeghem	
1999	17–19 Sep	Sandrine Mendiburu	France	208	−8	2 strokes	(England) Lora Fairclough	
