= Marrakech Palmeraie Open =

Tournament information
- Location: Marrakesh, Morocco
- Established: 1998
- Course: Palmeraie Golf Palace
- Par: 72
- Tour: Ladies European Tour
- Format: 54-hole Stroke play
- Prize fund: £100,000
- Month played: October
- Final year: 2000

Tournament record score
- Aggregate: 201 Sophie Gustafson (1998)
- To par: −15 Sophie Gustafson (1998)

Final champion
- (Australia) Alison Munt
- Location in Morocco Location in Africa

The Marrakech Palmeraie Open was a women's professional golf tournament on the Ladies European Tour that was held at Palmeraie Golf Palace in Marrakesh, Morocco.

The tournament was played for three years between 1998 and 2000, and served as the tour's season-ending event.

== Winners ==
Year	Winner	Country	Score	To par	Margin of victory	Runner-up	Ref
2000	Alison Munt	Australia	70-70-67=207	−9	3 strokes	(England) Trish Johnson	
1999	Trish Johnson	England	70-67-67=204	–12	5 strokes	(Belgium) Valérie Van Ryckeghem	
1998	Sophie Gustafson	Sweden	66-67-68=201	–15	8 strokes	(France) Marie-Laure de Lorenzi	

== See also ==
- Lalla Meryem Cup
