= Ludivine Kreutz =

French professional golfer (born 1973)

Personal information
- Full name: Ludivine Kreutz
- Nationality: France
- Born: 24 September 1973 (age 53) Rognac, France

Career
- Sport: Golf
- Turned professional: 1997
- Current tour: Ladies European Tour
- Professional wins: 3

Number of wins by tour
- Ladies European Tour: 3

Best results in LPGA major championships
- Chevron Championship: CUT: 2006
- Women's PGA C'ship: DNP
- U.S. Women's Open: CUT: 1998
- Women's British Open: CUT: 2003, 2005-08
Medal record
Mediterranean Games
| Silver medal – second place | 1997 Bari | Women's team |

Ludivine Kreutz (born 24 September 1973) is a French professional golfer. She was French Amateur Champion in 1995 and joined the Ladies European Tour in 1998. She has won three titles on the tour and finished sixth on the Order of Merit in both 2003 and 2005. She represented Europe in the 2005 Solheim Cup.

== Ladies European Tour wins (3) ==
- 2003 La Perla Ladies Italian Open
- 2005 Tenerife Ladies Open, Ladies Central European Open

== Team appearances ==
Amateur

- European Lady Junior's Team Championship (representing France): 1994
- European Ladies' Team Championship (representing France): 1995, 1997

Professional

- Solheim Cup (representing Europe): 2005
