= Gwladys Nocera =

French professional golfer (born 1975)

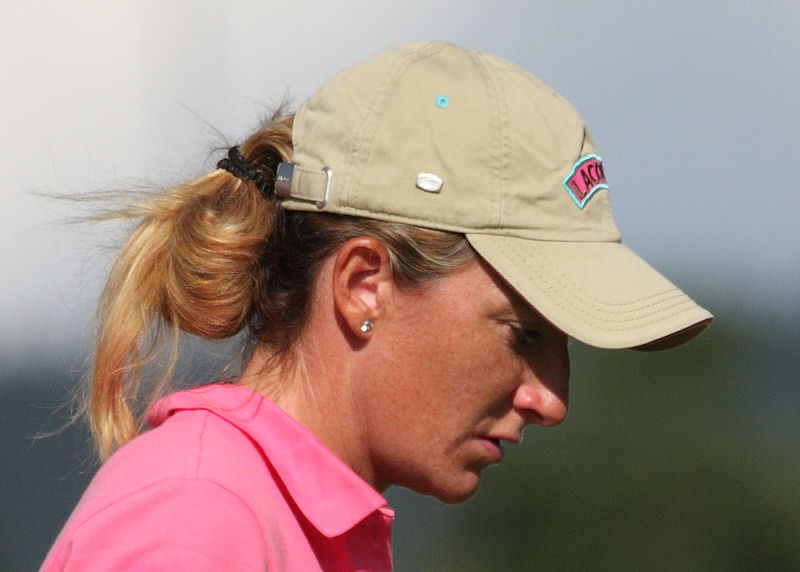

Personal information
- Nationality: France
- Born: 22 May 1975 (age 51) Moulins, France
- Height: 5 ft 6 in (1.68 m)

Career
- Sport: Golf
- College: New Mexico State University (2001, International Business)
- Turned professional: 2002
- Former tours: Ladies European Tour (joined 2003); LPGA Tour (joined 2010)
- Professional wins: 15

Number of wins by tour
- Ladies European Tour: 14 (T7th all-time)
- WPGA Tour of Australasia: 1

Best results in LPGA major championships
- Chevron Championship: T24: 2010
- Women's PGA C'ship: 72: 2015
- U.S. Women's Open: T38: 2016
- Women's British Open: T12: 2014
- Evian Championship: T64: 2015

Achievements and awards
- Ladies European Tour Order of Merit winner: 2008
- Ladies European Tour Player of the Year: 2006, 2008
Medal record
Mediterranean Games
Silver medal – second place	1997 Bari	Women's team

Gwladys Nocera (born 22 May 1975) is a French professional golfer. She formerly played on the Ladies European Tour and the LPGA Tour.

== Early life and amateur career ==
In 1975, Nocera was born in Moulins, Allier. She is of Portuguese descent.

Nocera had a successful amateur career. She finished runner up at the 1998 British Ladies Amateur Championship, was a member of the victorious European championship French team in 1999 and the youngest ever winning captain in the 2000 Espirito Santo Trophy (World Amateur Golf Team Championships). Nocera was a playing member of the 2002 French Espirito Santo Trophy team.

In 2001, she graduated from New Mexico State University.

Nocera was runner-up at the 2002 French Amateur Championship, 2002 French International Champion, and 2002 German International champion.

== Professional career ==
In 2002, Nocera turned professional at the relatively late age of twenty-seven. She finished ninth at the 2002 Ladies European Tour Qualifying School to win a place on the tour for the following season. After a modest start she improved dramatically in 2005, when she finished fourth on the Order of Merit and made her Solheim Cup debut where she beat Cristie Kerr in her singles match.

In 2006, her career took another upward turn. She started the year representing France at the Women's World Cup of Golf with Karine Icher. She scored her first three Ladies European Tour tournament victories at the Ladies Swiss Open, the BMW Ladies Italian Open and the Catalonia Ladies Masters. She also played in her first women's major tournament, the Kraft Nabisco Championship. She finished second on the New Star Money list being beaten only by Laura Davies the holder of the record number of money list wins and was voted Players’ Player of the Year by her fellow Ladies European Tour professionals.

On 20 January 2008, at the fourth Women's World Cup of Golf in Sun City, South Africa, team France with Nocera and Virginie Lagoutte-Clément finished fifth, seven shots behind winning South Korean team Jiyai Shin and Ji Eun-hee over 54 holes.

In 2009, Nocera earned her LPGA Tour card at LPGA Q-School and at the age of 34 was a rookie and an LPGA Tour member the following season. She played the LPGA Tour full-time in 2010 and 2011, reaching a career best second place at the 2010 CVS/Pharmacy LPGA Challenge.

=== LET 72-hole scoring record ===
Nocera won the 2008 Göteborg Masters by an 11 stroke margin after scoring 259 (−29) following rounds of 66-62-65-66, the best 72-hole score in the LET's 40-year history. The bogey-free round of 62 is only one stroke off the LET single round scoring record of 61 (−11).

2008 Göteborg Masters scorecard
Hole	1	2	3	4	5	6	7	8	9	Out	10	11	12	13	14	15	16	17	18	In	Total	To par
Par	4	3	5	4	4	3	5	4	3	35	4	5	3	4	3	5	4	5	4	37	72	
Meter	340	125	425	265	350	130	485	320	140	2580	315	430	150	330	198	455	345	420	350	2993	5573	
Round 1	4	3	4	3	4	2	4	4	2	30	5	4	3	4	3	4	4	5	4	36	66	−6
Round 2	4	3	4	3	4	3	3	3	2	29	4	4	3	3	2	5	4	4	4	33	62	−10
Round 3	5	3	3	3	4	3	4	3	2	30	4	5	4	4	2	4	4	4	4	35	65	−7
Round 4	4	2	4	3	5	3	5	4	3	33	3	5	2	4	3	5	3	4	4	33	66	−6
Total	+1	−1	−5	−4	+1	−1	−4	−2	−3	−18	E	−2	E	−1	−2	−2	−1	−3	E	−11	259	−29

== Awards and honors ==
- In 2006 and 2008, Nocera was honored with Ladies European Tour Player of the Year honors.
- In 2008, Nocera she led the Ladies European Tour Order of Merit.

== Amateur wins ==
- 2002 French International Ladies Amateur Championship, German International Championship

== Professional wins (15) ==
=== Ladies European Tour wins (14) ===
No.	Date	Tournament	Winning score	To par	Margin of victory	Runner(s)-up
1	21 May 2006	Ladies Swiss Open	69-70-63-71=273	–15	3 strokes	(England) Laura Davies
2	17 Jun 2006	BMW Ladies Italian Open	71-66-65-72=274	–14	2 strokes	(France) Sophie Giquel-Bettan
3	23 Jul 2006	Catalonia Ladies Masters	69-69-69=207	–9	5 strokes	(Australia) Sarah Kemp
4	10 Jun 2007	KLM Ladies Open	64-70-67=201	–15	7 strokes	(France) Virginie Lagoutte-Clement
5	8 Dec 2007	EMAAR-MGF Ladies Masters	69-69-72-71=281	–7	1 stroke	(France) Virginie Lagoutte-Clement
6	4 May 2008	Ladies Scottish Open	69-70-69=208	–5	2 strokes	(Sweden) Maria Bodén
7	8 Jun 2008	Dutch Ladies Open	67-65-71=203	–13	1 stroke	(England) Mel Reid
8	24 Aug 2008	SAS Masters	69-66-68=203	–13	3 strokes	(England) Tania Elósegui, (England) Samantha Head
9	21 Sep 2008	Göteborg Masters	66-62-65-66=259	–29	11 strokes	(Sweden) Nina Reis
10	5 Oct 2008	Madrid Ladies Masters	72-69-67=208	–11	4 strokes	(Spain) Paula Martí
11	23 Jun 2013	Allianz Ladies Slovak Open	70-68-71-70=279	–9	4 strokes	(South Africa) Lee-Anne Pace
12	3 Nov 2013	China Suzhou Taihu Open	-65=201	–15	2 strokes	(Spain) Carlota Ciganda
13	6 Dec 2014	Hero Women's Indian Open	64-72-72=208	–11	5 strokes	(Switzerland) Fabienne In-Albon, (England) Hannah Burke, (South Korea) Hyeon Seo Kang
14	29 Mar 2015	Lalla Meryem Cup	68-65-68-70=271	–13	2 strokes	(England) Felicity Johnson, (South Africa) Nicole Garcia, (England) Mel Reid

=== Australian Ladies Professional Golf Tour wins (1) ===
No.	Date	Tournament	Winning score	To par	Margin of victory	Runners-up
1	2009	New Zealand Women's Open	71-68-69=208	−8	6 strokes	(Australia) Nikki Garrett, (Australia) Katherine Hull, (Australia) Sarah Kemp, (South Korea) Bobea Park

== Ladies European Tour career summary ==
Year	Wins	Earnings (€)	Order of Merit rank	Scoring average
2003	0	19,227.24	51	73.32
2004	0	52,496.77	23	72.60
2005	0	164,739.73	4	71.31
2006	3	415,020.50	2	70.42
2007	2	207,478.98	3	71.97
2008	5	391,839.58	1	70.54
2009	0	137,730.27	9	71.85
2010	0	65,716.66	33	
2011	0	51,285.20	46	
2012	0	99,744.81	17	72.39
2013	2	221,287.93	4	71.60
2014	1	233,288.65	2	71.00

== Team appearances ==
Amateur

- European Ladies' Team Championship (representing France): 1997, 1999 (winners), 2001
- Espirito Santo Trophy (representing France): 2000 (non-playing captain, winners), 2002

Professional

- Solheim Cup (representing Europe): 2005, 2007, 2009, 2015
- World Cup (representing France): 2006, 2007, 2008
- The Queens (representing Europe): 2015, 2017 (captain)

=== Solheim Cup record ===
Year	Total matches	Total W–L–H	Singles W–L–H	Foursomes W–L–H	Fourballs W–L–H	Points won	Points %
Career	12	6–4–2	1–2–1	3–1–1	2–1–0	7	58.3%
2005	2	1–1–0	1–0–0 def C. Kerr 2&1	0–1–0 lost w/L. Kreutz 4&2		1	50%
2007	4	1–2–1	0–1–0 lost to N. Gulbis 4&3	1–0–1 won w/M. Hjorth 3&2, halved w/M. Hjorth	0–1–0 lost w/S. Gustafson 3&2	1.5	37.5%
2009	4	3–0–1	0–0–1 halved w/J. Inkster	2–0–0 won w/B.Brewerton 3&1, won w/B.Brewerton 5&4	1–0–0 won w/M. Hjorth 1 up	3.5	87.6%
2015	2	1–1–0	0–1–0 lost to A. Lee 3&1	0–0–0	1–0–0 won w/ C. Hull 3&2	1	50%

== See also ==
- List of golfers with most Ladies European Tour wins
- Ladies European Tour records
