= Women's World Cup of Golf =

Professional golf tournament

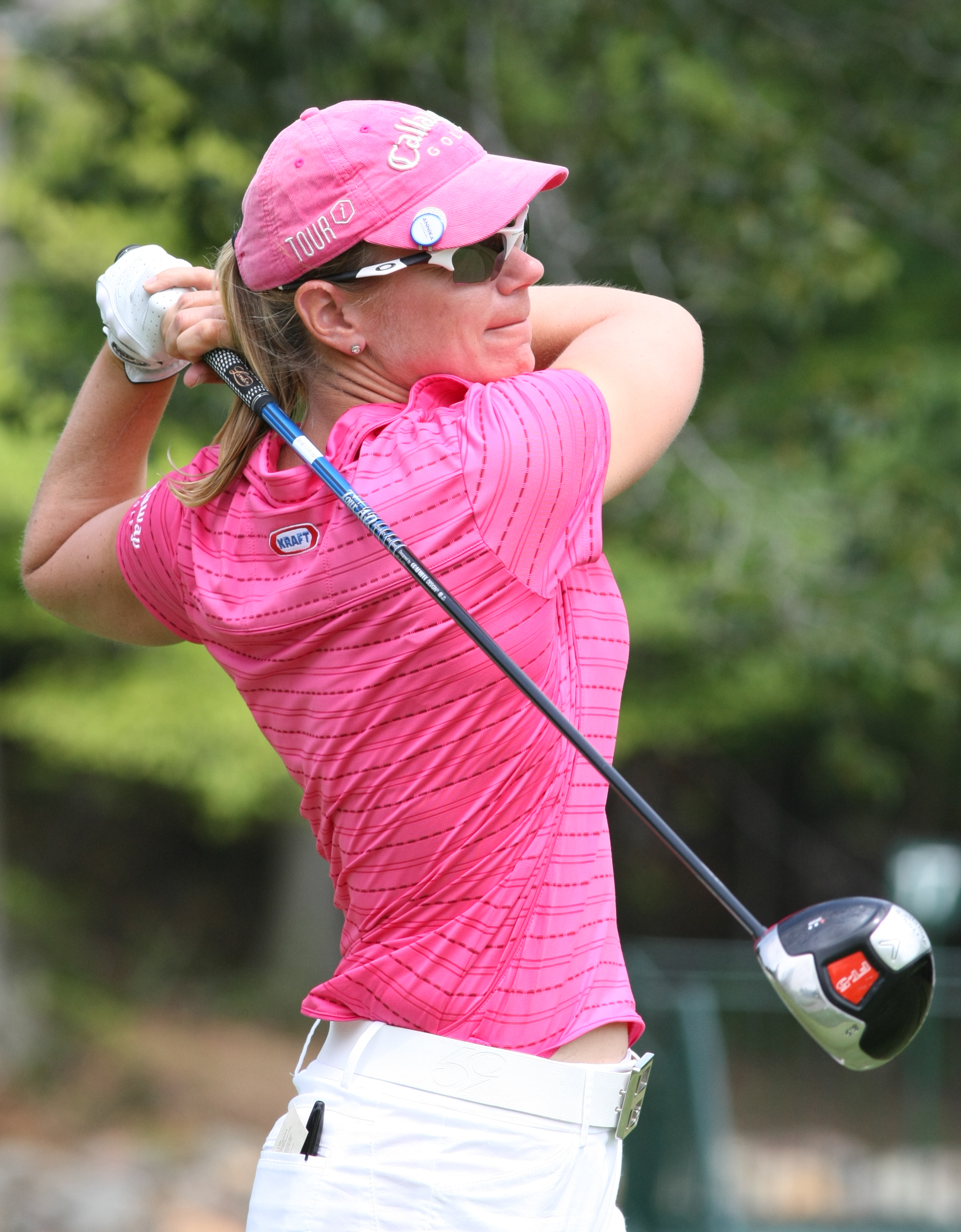
Annika Sörenstam won the title once representing Sweden.

The Women's World Cup of Golf was a professional golf tournament contested by teams of two female golfers representing their respective countries.

The tournament was played in several incarnations, first in 1992 as the Sunrise Cup World Team Championship held in Taiwan, and in 2000 at Adare Manor in Ireland sanctioned only by the Ladies European Tour.

It was later played annually between 2005 and 2008 - in 2005 at The Links at Fancourt Resort and Country Club, and from 2006 to 2008 at Gary Player Country Club in South Africa, and sanctioned also by the LPGA Tour, money unofficial on both tours. The purse in the final year was US$1.4 million. The field consisted of twenty-two teams and each qualifying country could field one team. It was held in January or February, at the beginning of the season for the world's dominant professional tours.

In 2014, the International Crown succeeded the event, a women's team golf tournament featuring national teams of four players.

== Winners ==
Year	Dates	Tour (Note: LET – Ladies European Tour; LPGA – LPGA Tour)	Country	Team	Runners-up	Third-place	Individual
Women's World Cup of Golf
2008	Jan 18–20	LET; LPGA	Philippines	Jennifer Rosales & Dorothy Delasin	(South Korea) Jiyai Shin & Eun-Hee Ji	(Japan) Miki Saiki & Shinobu Moromizato (Chinese Taipei) Amy Hung & Yun-Jye Wei	n/a
2007	Jan 19–21	LET; LPGA	Paraguay	Julieta Granada & Celeste Troche	(United States) Pat Hurst & Juli Inkster	(South Korea) Young Kim & Jiyai Shin	n/a
2006	Jan 20–22	LET; LPGA	Sweden	Annika Sörenstam & Liselotte Neumann	(Scotland) Catriona Matthew & Janice Moodie	(Wales) Becky Brewerton & Becky Morgan	n/a
2005	Feb 11–13	LET; LPGA	Japan	Ai Miyazato & Rui Kitada	(South Korea) Jang Jeong & Bo Bae Song (Philippines) Jennifer Rosales & Dorothy Delasin	—	n/a
TSN Ladies World Cup Golf
2000	Sep 15–17	LET	Sweden	Carin Koch & Sophie Gustafson	(England) Laura Davies & Trish Johnson	(Australia) Alison Munt & Jane Crafter	(England) Laura Davies
Sunrise Cup World Team Championship
1992	Oct 16–18	LET	Sweden	Liselotte Neumann & Helen Alfredsson	(England) Trish Johnson & Laura Davies	(United States) Jane Geddes & Meg Mallon	(England) Trish Johnson (Sweden) Liselotte Neumann

== Performance by nation 2005–2008 ==
Team	Champions	Runners-up	Third-place
Philippines	1	1	0
Japan	1	0	1
Paraguay	1	0	0
Sweden	1	0	0
South Korea	0	2	1
Scotland	0	1	0
United States	0	1	0
Taiwan	0	0	1
Wales	0	0	1

== Teams ==
22 nation teams contested the event.

Participating teams 2006
Country	Players	
Australia	Shani Waugh	Rachel Hetherington
Brazil	Candy Hannemann	Luciana Bemvenuti
Canada	Lorie Kane	A. J. Eathorne
Colombia	Christina Baena	Marisa Baena
England	Laura Davies	Kirsty Taylor
Finland	Minea Blomqvist	Riikka Hakkarainen
France	Karine Icher	Gwladys Nocera
Germany	Anja Monke	Miriam Nagl
Italy	Veronica Zorzi	Silvia Cavalleri
Japan	Ai Miyazato	Sakura Yokomine
Kenya	Rose Naliaka	Mary Karano
South Korea	Song Bo-bae	Meena Lee
New Zealand	Lynn Brooky	Gina Scott
Philippines	Dorothy Delasin	Ria Quiazon
Scotland	Catriona Matthew	Janice Moodie
South Africa	Laurette Maritz	Sally Little
South Africa	Caryn Louw	Ashleigh Simon (a)
Spain	Paula Marti	Marta Prieto
Sweden	Annika Sörenstam	Liselotte Neumann
Chinese Taipei	Amy Hung	Yu Ping Lin
United States	Paula Creamer	Natalie Gulbis
Wales	Becky Brewerton	Becky Morgan

Participating teams 2007
Country	Players	
Australia	Nikki Garrett	Lindsey Wright
Brazil	Candy Hannemann	Maria Priscila Iida
Denmark	Iben Tinning	Karen-Margrethe Juul
England	Laura Davies	Trish Johnson
Finland	Riikka Hakkarainen	Jenni Kuosa
France	Gwladys Nocera	Stephanie Arricau
Germany	Anja Monke	Denise Simon
Ireland	Rebecca Coakley	Hazel Kavanagh
Italy	Veronica Zorzi	Giulia Sergas
Japan	Shinobu Moromizato	Momoko Ueda
Kenya	Rose Naliaka	Jane Njoroge (a)
South Korea	Kim Young	Jiyai Shin
New Zealand	Lynn Brooky	Elizabeth McKinnon
Norway	Suzann Pettersen	Marianne Skarpnord
Paraguay	Julieta Granada	Celeste Troche
Scotland	Janice Moodie	Mhairi McKay
South Africa	Ashleigh Simon	Laurette Maritz
Spain	Ana Sánchez	Tania Elosegui
Sweden	Helen Alfredsson	Carin Koch
Chinese Taipei	Amy Hung	Yu Ping Lin
United States	Juli Inkster	Pat Hurst
Wales	Becky Brewerton	Becky Morgan

== See also ==
- World Cup of Golf - the equivalent event for men's golf.
