= Nikki Garrett =

Australian professional golfer

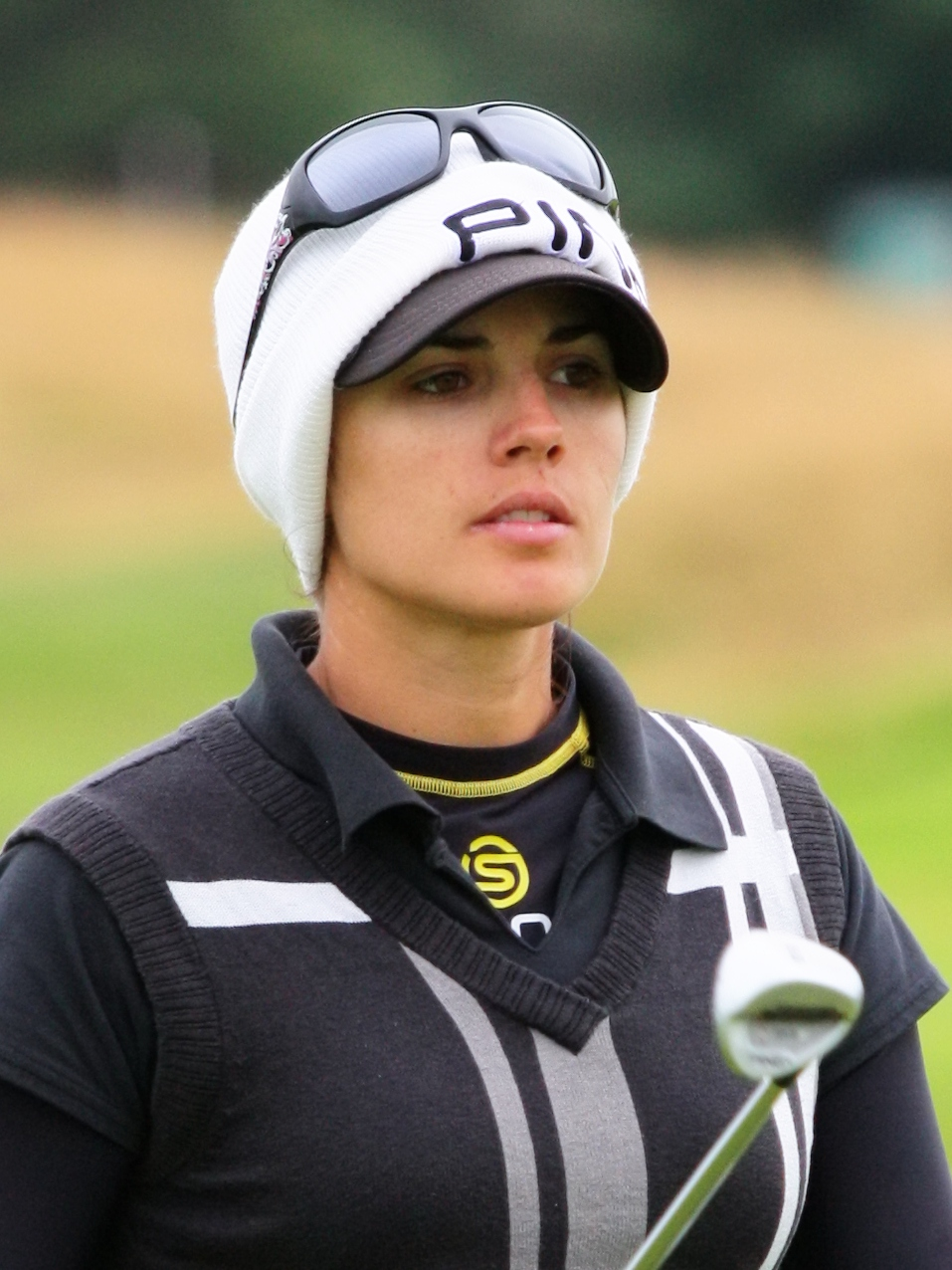
- Garrett before 2009 Women's British Open

Personal information
- Nationality: Australia
- Born: 8 January 1984 (age 42) Gosford, New South Wales, Australia
- Height: 1.69 m (5 ft 7 in)

Career
- Sport: Golf
- Turned professional: 2005
- Current tours: Ladies European Tour; ALPG Tour
- Professional wins: 2

Number of wins by tour
- Ladies European Tour: 2

Best results in LPGA major championships
- Chevron Championship: DNP
- Women's PGA C'ship: DNP
- U.S. Women's Open: DNP
- Women's British Open: T42: 2006

Achievements and awards
- Ladies European Tour Rookie of the Year: 2006

Nicole Maree "Nikki" Garrett (born 8 January 1984) is an Australian professional golfer.

Garrett turned professional in late 2005, and qualified for the 2006 Ladies European Tour (LET). She did not win a tournament in her rookie season, but she had four top-ten finishes, ended up 12th on the Order of Merit standings with €99,445 in earnings, and won the 2006 Ryder Cup Wales Rookie of the Year award. In 2007, she collected back to back LET titles at the Tenerife Ladies Open and the Open de Espana Femenino.

== Professional wins (2) ==
=== Ladies European Tour wins (2) ===
- 2007 (2) Tenerife Ladies Open, Open De España Femenino

== Ladies European Tour career summary ==
Year	Wins	Earnings (€)	Money list rank	Average
2006	0	99,445.05	12	72.35
2007	2	135,612.98	16	73.23

== Team appearances ==
Amateur

- Queen Sirikit Cup (representing Australia): 2005

Professional

- World Cup (representing Australia): 2007, 2008
- The Queens (representing Australia): 2015
