= Ladies Central European Open =

The Ladies Central European Open was a women's professional golf tournament on the Ladies European Tour (LET) from 2004 to 2006. In 2006 it was the only LET event that is actually played in Europe that is held east of the former Iron Curtain. It was first played in 2004 and is hosted by Old Lake Golf Club, Tata, Hungary. The 2006 prize fund was €165,000.

== Winners ==
- 2006 Rebecca Hudson - England
- 2005 Ludivine Kreutz - France
- 2004 Minea Blomqvist - Finland
