= Ladies European Tour records =

Golf tournament series records

These are achievements of play on Ladies European Tour events.

== Individual scoring records ==
=== Winning scores ===
Score	Player	Event	Note
Lowest winning aggregate
36 holes
136 (−2)	(England) Laura Davies	1990 AGF Biarritz Ladies Open	Weather shortened
54 hole totals (aggregate)
190 (−19)	(France) Karine Icher	2004 Catalonia Ladies Masters	Empordà Golf, Gualta
54 hole totals (to par)
194 (−22)	(Norway) Suzann Pettersen	2008 Deutsche Bank Ladies Swiss Open	Weather shortened
72 hole totals (aggregate)
249 (−11)	(Scotland) Dale Reid	1991 Bloor Homes Eastleigh Classic	Fleming Park, Southampton
249 (−11)	(England) Trish Johnson	1990 Bloor Homes Eastleigh Classic	Fleming Park, Southampton
72 hole totals (to par)
259 (−29)	(France) Gwladys Nocera	2008 Göteborg Masters	Lycke Golf Club
Highest winning aggregate
72 hole totals
292 (+4)	(Spain) Raquel Carriedo	2002 Tenerife Ladies Open	Golf del Sur
292 (+4)	(United States) Sherri Steinhauer	1998 Weetabix Women's British Open	Royal Lytham & St Annes Golf Club

=== Lowest rounds ===
Score	Player	Event	Note
Lowest rounds
Lowest rounds including eagles and albatrosses
61 (−11)	(South Korea) So Yeon Ryu	2012 Gold Coast RACV Australian Ladies Masters	R2, 10 birdies, 1 eagle, RACV Royal Pines Resort
61 (−11)	(Australia) Karrie Webb	2010 ANZ Ladies Masters	R4, 9 birdies, 1 eagle
61 (−11)	(Sweden) Nina Reis	2008 Göteborg Masters	R4, 2 bogeys, 7 birdies, 3 eagles
61 (−11)	(England) Kirsty Taylor	2005 Wales Ladies Championship of Europe	R1, 9 birdies, 1 eagle
62 (−10)	(Sweden) Caroline Hedwall	2012 Hero Women's Indian Open	R2, 9 birdies, 1 eagle, 1 bogey
62 (−11)	(England) Trish Johnson	1996 Ladies French Open	R1, 9 birdies and 1 eagle, a Hole-in-one
62 (−10)	(England) Felicity Johnson	2008 Göteborg Masters	R1, 8 birdies, 1 eagle
62 (−10)	(France) Gwladys Nocera	2008 Göteborg Masters	R2, 8 birdies, 1 eagle
62 (−10)	(Norway) Suzann Pettersen	2003 HP Open	8 birdies, 1 eagle
62 (−10)	(Finland) Minea Blomqvist	2004 Weetabix Women's British Open	6 birdies, 2 eagles
62 (−10)	(Germany) Bettina Hauert	2007 BMW Ladies Italian Open	6 birdies, 2 eagles
Lowest rounds (to par)
62 (−11)	(England) Trish Johnson	1996 Ladies French Open	Round 1, Le Golf d'Arras
61 (−11)	(England) Kirsty Taylor	2005 Wales Ladies Championship of Europe	Round 1, Machynys Peninsula Golf Country Club
61 (−11)	(Sweden) Nina Reis	2008 Göteborg Masters	Round 4, Lycke Golf Club, Sweden
62 (−11)	(Denmark) Lisa Holm Sørensen	2009 SAS Ladies Masters	Round 1, Larvik Golfklubb, Norway
61 (−11)	(Australia) Karrie Webb	2010 ANZ Ladies Masters	Round 4, Royal Pines, Australia
61 (−11)	(South Korea) So Yeon Ryu	2012 Gold Coast RACV Australian Ladies Masters	Round 2, RACV Royal Pines Resort
Lowest rounds (aggregate)
58 (−7)	(Scotland) Dale Reid	1991 Bloor Homes Eastleigh Classic	Round 4, Fleming Park
58 (−7)	(Scotland) Jane Connachan	1991 Bloor Homes Eastleigh Classic	Fleming Park
58 (−7)	(England) Trish Johnson	1990 Bloor Homes Eastleigh Classic	Round 3, Fleming Park
18 holes
Lowest first 18-hole score if winner
61 (−11)	(England) Kirsty Taylor	2005 Wales Ladies Championship of Europe	Machynys Peninsula Golf Country Club
Highest first 18-hole score if winner
81 (+9)	(United States) Sherri Steinhauer	1998 Weetabix Women's British Open	Royal Lytham & St Annes Golf Club
Lowest 18-hole round 2 score
61 (−11)	(South Korea) So Yeon Ryu	2012 Gold Coast RACV Australian Ladies Masters	RACV Royal Pines Resort
Lowest 18-hole round 4 score
61 (−10)	(Sweden) Nina Reis	2008 Göteborg Masters	Lycke Golf Club, Sweden
36 holes
Lowest 36 holes total score
128 (−16)	(France) Gwladys Nocera	2008 Göteborg Masters	Lycke Golf Club
Lowest 36 holes (If winner)
128 (−16)	(France) Gwladys Nocera	2008 Göteborg Masters	Lycke Golf Club
Highest 36-hole score if winner (72-hole event)
158 (+14)	(United States) Sherri Steinhauer	1998 Weetabix Women's British Open	Royal Lytham & St Annes Golf Club
54 holes
Lowest 54 holes round 3 score
62 (−10)	(France) Gwladys Nocera	2008 Deutsche Bank Ladies Swiss Open	Golf Gerre Losone
62 (−10)	(England) Rebecca Hudson	2005 OTP Bank Ladies Central European Open	
62 (−10)	(France) Karine Icher	2004 Catalonia Ladies Masters	
62 (−10)	(Finland) Minea Blomqvist	2004 Weetabix Women's British Open	
Lowest 54 holes (round 3) total score
193 (−23)	(France) Gwladys Nocera	2008 Göteborg Masters	Lycke Golf Club
Highest 54 holes if winner (72-hole event)
223 (+7)	(United States) Sherri Steinhauer	1998 Weetabix Women's British Open	Royal Lytham & St Annes Golf Club
72 holes
72 holes (to par)
259 (−29)	(France) Gwladys Nocera	2008 Göteborg Masters	Lycke Golf Club
72 holes (aggregate)
249 (−11)	(Scotland) Dale Reid	1991 Bloor Homes Eastleigh Classic	Fleming Park, Southampton
249 (−11)	(England) Trish Johnson	1990 Bloor Homes Eastleigh Classic	Fleming Park, Southampton
Low final round score to win
To par
63 (−9)	(South Korea) Amy Yang	2008 Scandinavian TPC hosted by Annika	
Aggregate
58 (−7)	(England) Dale Reid	1991 Bloor Homes Eastleigh Classic	Fleming Park, Southampton
62 (−7)	(France) Karine Icher	2004 Catalonia Ladies Masters	Spain

=== Hole-in-ones ===
Most career holes in one
Count	Player
4	(Italy) Diana Luna
3	(Scotland) Catriona Matthew
2	(Denmark) Iben Tinning
2	(England) Lisa Hall
2	(Germany) Martina Eberl
2	(Sweden) Johanna Westerberg
2	(South Korea) Amy Yang
2	(France) Patricia Meunier-Lebouc
2	(Spain) Tania Elósegui
2	(England) Trish Johnson
2	(Spain) Marta Prieto

== Miscellaneous records ==
=== Consecutive wins ===
Count	Player	Tournament
Most consecutive wins back-to-back
3	(France) Marie-Laure de Lorenzi	1989 Ford Ladies' Classic, Hennessy Ladies Cup and BMW Ladies Classic
Most consecutive wins in the same tournament
3	(Sweden) Annika Sörenstam	2004 HP Open, 2005 and 2006 Scandinavian TPC hosted by Annika (tournament changed name)
Most wins in the same tournament
8	(Australia) Karrie Webb	ANZ Ladies Masters: 1998, 1999, 2000, 2001, 2005, 2007, 2010, 2013
6	(Sweden) Annika Sörenstam	Compaq Open (also played as HP Open and Scandinavian TPC hosted by Annika): 1997, 1998, 2002, 2004, 2005, 2006

=== Wins in one season ===
Most wins in one season
Count	Player	Year
7	(France) Marie-Laure de Lorenzi	1988
5	(England) Laura Davies	2010
5	(South Africa) Lee-Anne Pace	2010
5	(France) Gwladys Nocera	2008

== See also ==
- Champions Tour records
- List of golfers with most Ladies European Tour wins
