= Nina Reis =

Swedish professional golfer

Personal information
- Full name: Nina Syvertsen Reis
- Nationality: Sweden
- Born: 16 February 1980 (age 46) Kungälv, Sweden

Career
- Sport: Golf
- College: University of North Texas
- Turned professional: 2003
- Former tours: Ladies European Tour (joined 2004); LPGA Tour (2006–2008); Swedish Golf Tour
- Professional wins: 6

Best results in LPGA major championships
- Women's PGA C'ship: T34: 2006
- Women's British Open: T10: 2006

Achievements and awards
- Swedish Golf Tour Order of Merit: 2005

Nina Reis (born 16 February 1980) is a retired Swedish professional golfer who played on the Ladies European Tour (LET) and LPGA Tour. She was runner-up at the 2008 Göteborg Masters after an LET joint record 11-under-par round of 61 and finished top-10 at the 2006 Women's British Open.

== Amateur career ==
Reis was part of the Swedish team, together with Kristina Engström, Anna Gertsson, Mikaela Parmlid, Helena Svensson and Linda Wessberg, which won the 2001 European Ladies' Team Championship at Golf de Mais, Spain.

She played collegiate golf at the University of North Texas. She was a two-time all-conference selection while at North Texas in 2000 and 2001. In 2001 she led the team in stroke average and was named to the All-Sun Belt Conference team. In 2000 she was named to the first-team All-Big West squad. Reis had six top-10 finishes her freshman season and finished tied for fifth at the Big West Conference Championship.

== Professional career ==
Reis turned professional in 2003 and joined the LET. She then joined the LPGA Tour in 2006 after a successful LPGA Final Qualifying Tournament where she finished 16th. She recorded top-10 finishes at the 2006 State Farm Rail Classic and 2008 Corona Championship, as well as the 2006 Women's British Open.

Her best LET season was 2008 when she played in 16 events and posted four top-10 finishes, including runner-up finishes at the Göteborg Masters and Open de France Dames, back to back in September. She was also fourth at SAS Ladies Masters and ninth at Nykredit Masters. She finished 22nd on the LET Money List.

=== Round of 61 ===
Reis scored 270 (−18) by shooting 69-67-73-61 at the 2008 Göteborg Masters. The 11-under-par 61 tied the LET 18-hole record for all time lowest round set by Kirsty Taylor at the 2005 Wales Ladies Championship of Europe. After 17 holes, Reis was at −12 for the day and a score of 59 looked possible, but she bogeyed the last hole to drop back to −11 for the day and a total −18 for second place, her career best finish on the LET. Gwladys Nocera won after scoring 259 (−29) following rounds of 66-62-65-66, the best 72-hole score in the LET's 30-year history.

Hole	1	2	3	4	5	6	7	8	9	Out	10	11	12	13	14	15	16	17	18	In	Total
Meters	340	125	425	265	350	130	485	320	140	2580	315	430	150	330	198	455	345	420	350	2993	5573
Par	4	3	5	4	4	3	5	4	3	35	4	5	3	4	3	5	4	5	4	37	72
Score	4	2	4	3	3	3	3	4	3	29	5	3	3	3	3	4	3	3	5	32	61
Score	E	−1	−2	−3	−4	−4	−6	−6	−6	−6	−5	−7	−7	−8	−8	−9	−10	−12	−11	−11	−11

== Professional wins (6) ==
=== Swedish Golf Tour (6) ===
No.	Date	Tournament	Winning score	To par	Margin of victory	Runner-up	Ref
1	15 May 2002	Telia Grand Opening Ladies	69-76=145	+5	1 stroke	(Sweden) Karin Sjödin	
2	13 May 2003	Telia Grand Opening Ladies	74-70=144	+4	2 strokes	(Finland) Minea Blomqvist	
3	19 Jun 2005	Felix Finnish Ladies Open	68-72-69=209	−4	3 strokes	(Finland) Riikka Hakkarainen	
3	29 Jul 2005	HaningeStrand Club SGT Open	72-68-67=207	−9	9 strokes	(Sweden) Hanna-Sofia Leijon	
5	20 Aug 2005	Skandia PGA Open Ladies	70-73-67=210	E	3 strokes	(Sweden) Nina Karlsson	
6	30 May 2009	Fredrik Jacobson Masters	79-68-72=219	+3	6 strokes	(Sweden) Madeleine Augustsson	

== Team appearances ==
Amateur

- European Lady Junior's Team Championship (representing Sweden): 2000
- European Ladies' Team Championship (representing Sweden): 2001 (winners)

== See also ==
- Ladies European Tour records
