= Simon's Golf Club =

Golf club in Denmark

- Location in Denmark
- 55.976°N 12.488°E

Club information
- Location: Helsingør Municipality, Denmark
- Established: 1993
- Type: Public
- Tota holes: 27
- Tournaments: Danish Open; Nordic Open; Danish Ladies Masters; Shipco Masters
- Website: simonsgolf.dk

A-Loop
- Designed by: Martin Hawtree
- Par: 35
- Length: 3,015 metres (9,892 ft)

B-Loop
- Designed by: Martin Hawtree
- Par: 37
- Length: 3,416 metres (11,207 ft)

C-Loop
- Designed by: Martin Hawtree
- Par: 35
- Length: 3,192 metres (10,472 ft)

Simon's Golf Club is a 27-hole golf club located 35 kilometres (22 mi) north of Copenhagen in Helsingør Municipality, Denmark. In 2003, it became the first club in Denmark to host a European Tour event. It has also hosted tournaments on the European Senior Tour and Ladies European Tour.

== History ==
The club takes its name from its founder, shipping magnate Arne Simonsen, owner and CEO of Scan Group. The course, envisioned as one of the most prominent in Scandinavia, was designed by British golf course architect Martin Hawtree and construction began in 1991. The course design incorporated plans for a drainage system efficient enough to make it possible to play on normal greens and tees all year round.

The course was officially opened in May 1993 when Ian Woosnam hit the opening shot. In 2007 a 9-hole extension was completed, also designed by Martin Hawtree, and a skins match featuring Ian Woosnam, Colin Montgomerie and Søren Hansen inaugurated the course.

== Notable tournaments hosted ==
Between 1994 and 1997 the club hosted the Danish Open, Denmark's national open golf tournament, sanctioned by the Challenge Tour. In 2003, the club hosted the Nordic Open with a purse of €1,600,000, the first ever European Tour event in Denmark. Ian Poulter shot a 66 in the final round to secure victory, with Colin Montgomerie in 2nd place and home player Søren Hansen tied 3rd.

In 2008 the club hosted the Danish Ladies Masters, won by Martina Eberl ahead of Melissa Reid, Annika Sörenstam and Iben Tinning, in what was to be Sörenstam's final European event prior to her retirement at the end of the year.

In celebration of the club's 25th anniversary, it hosted the European Senior Tour event Shipco Masters in 2018. Colin Montgomerie won over a field that included Laura Davies, who became the first woman to play in a European Senior Tour event. Davies was 8-over-par after 16 holes of her opening round but played the remaining 38 holes in level par to finish tied for 44th in the field of 60.

| Year | Tour | Championship | Winner |
|---|---|---|---|
| 1994 | CHA | Danish Open | (England) Liam White |
| 1995 | CHA | Danish Open | (Australia) Rob Edwards |
| 1996 | CHA | Danish Open | (Sweden) Robert Jonsson |
| 1997 | CHA | Danish Open | (England) David Lynn |
| 2003 | EUR | Nordic Open | (England) Ian Poulter |
| 2008 | LET | Danish Ladies Masters | (Germany) Martina Eberl |
| 2018 | EST | Shipco Masters | (Scotland) Colin Montgomerie |
