= Helena Svensson =

Helena Svensson may refer to:

- Helena Lingham (born 1963), née Svensson, Swedish female curler
- Helena Svensson (golfer) (born 1979), Swedish golfer
