= Göteborg Masters =

Tournament information
- Location: Gothenburg, Sweden
- Established: 2008
- Course: Lycke Golf Club
- Par: 72
- Tour: Ladies European Tour
- Format: Stroke play
- Prize fund: €250,000
- Month played: September
- Final year: 2008

Tournament record score
- Aggregate: 259 Gwladys Nocera (2008)
- To par: −29 Gwladys Nocera (2008)

Final champion
- (France) Gwladys Nocera

The Göteborg Masters was a women's professional golf tournament on the Ladies European Tour that took place in Sweden.

The tournament was first played 2008 and meant to be a recurring annual event, but the 2009 tournament was cancelled due to financial difficulties and it never returned to the LET schedule.

Gwladys Nocera won after scoring 259 (−29) following rounds of 66-62-65-66, the best 72-hole score in the LET's 30-year history.

Nina Reis was the runner-up with 270 (−18), shooting 69-67-73-61. The 11-under-par 61 tied the record for the LET's all time lowest round set by Kirsty Taylor at the 2005 Wales Ladies Championship of Europe. After 17 holes, Reis was at (−12) for the day and a score of 59 looked possible, but she bogeyed the last hole to drop back to a (−18) 270 for second place, her career best finish on the LET.

== Winners ==
Year	Dates	Winner	Country	Score	To par	Margin of victory	Runner-up	Winner's share (€)
2009	13–16 Aug	Cancelled; financial difficulties						
2008	18–21 Sep	Gwladys Nocera	France	259	−29	11 strokes	(Sweden) Nina Reis	37,500
