= Federica Piovano =

Italian professional golfer

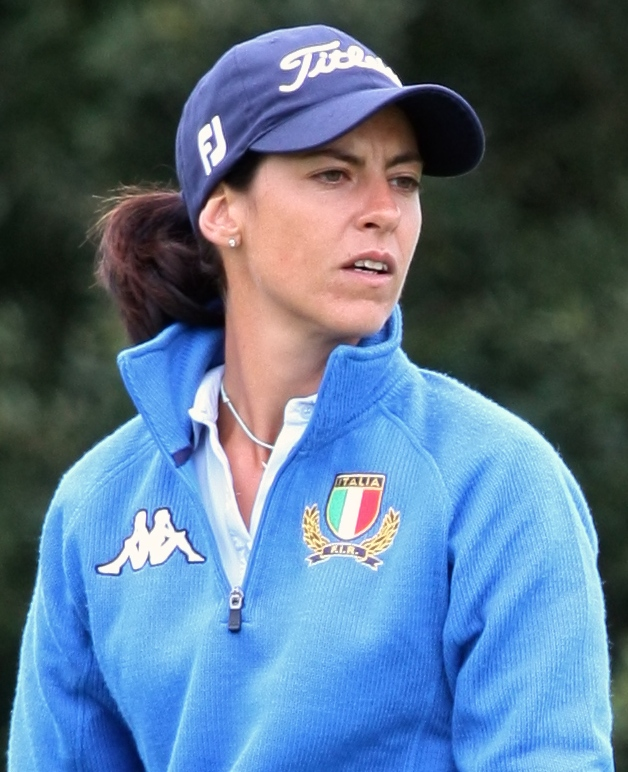
- Piovano at the 2009 Women's British Open

Personal information
- Nationality: Italy
- Born: 14 October 1981 (age 45) Rome, Italy
- Height: 1.68 m (5 ft 6 in)

Career
- Sport: Golf
- Turned professional: 2003
- Former tour: Ladies European Tour (2004–2011)
- Professional wins: 1

Number of wins by tour
- Ladies European Tour: 1

Best results in LPGA major championships
- Chevron Championship: DNP
- Women's PGA C'ship: DNP
- U.S. Women's Open: DNP
- Women's British Open: CUT: 2005, 2009
- Evian Championship: DNP

Federica Piovano (born 14 October 1981) is a professional golfer from Italy. She played on the Ladies European Tour 2004–2011 and won the 2005 Austrian Ladies Open.

== Career ==
As an amateur, Piovano represented Europe at the 1997 Junior Ryder Cup and represented the Continent of Europe at the Vagliano Trophy in 1999 and 2001. She was runner-up at the 1998 Espirito Santo Trophy in Chile with Sophie Sandolo and Giulia Sergas, and won the 2000 European Lady Junior's Team Championship.

Piovano turned professional in 2003 after finishing 17th at the Ladies European Tour Qualifying School. She won her only event on the Ladies European Tour in 2005 at the Siemens Austrian Ladies Open, beating Gwladys Nocera by one stroke.

Piovano withdrew with a wrist injury after eight holes during the first round of the 2011 Sicilian Ladies Italian Open and retired from tour, one week before turning 30, planning to continuing to work as a coach at Parco di Roma.

== Professional wins (1) ==
=== Ladies European Tour wins (1) ===
No.	Date	Tournament	Winning score	Margin of victory	Runner-up
1	29 May 2005	Siemens Austrian Ladies Open	−16 (70-62-72-68=272)	1 stroke	(France) Gwladys Nocera

== Team appearances ==
Amateur

- Junior Ryder Cup (representing Europe): 1997
- Espirito Santo Trophy (representing Italy): 1998
- European Ladies' Team Championship (representing Italy): 1999, 2001
- Vagliano Trophy (representing the Continent of Europe): 1999 (winners), 2001 (winners)
- European Lady Junior's Team Championship (representing Italy): 2000 (winners)
