= Carmen Alonso =

Spanish professional golfer

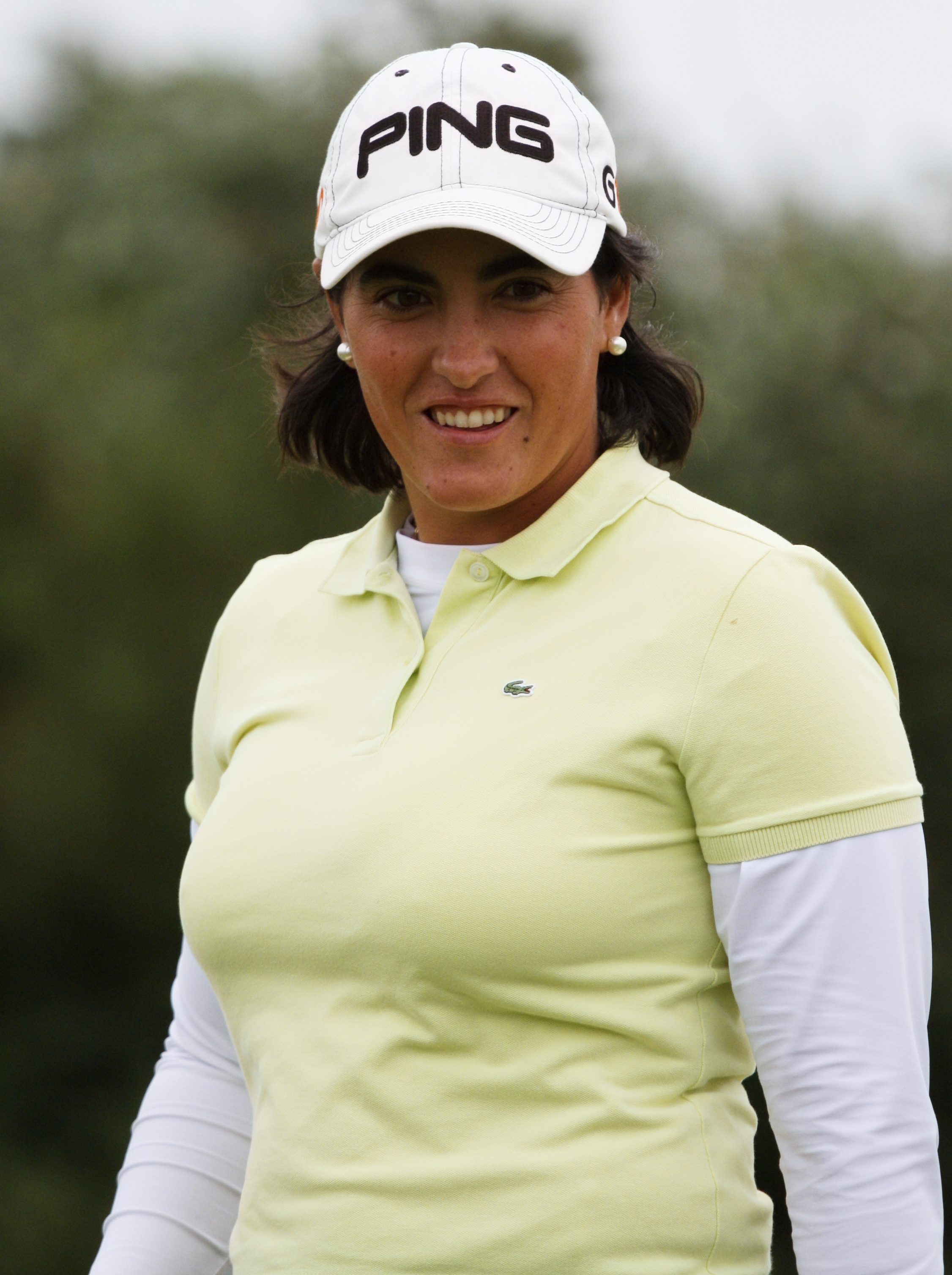
- Alonso at the 2009 Women's British Open

Personal information
- Full name: Carmen Alonso Fuentes
- Nationality: Spain
- Born: 15 July 1984 (age 42) Valladolid, Spain
- Height: 168 cm (5 ft 6 in)

Career
- Sport: Golf
- Turned professional: 2004
- Former tours: LET (2005–2026); Nedbank Women's Golf Tour; LET Access Series; Banesto Tour
- Professional wins: 3

Number of wins by tour
- Ladies European Tour: 1
- Other: 2

Best results in LPGA major championships
- Chevron Championship: DNP
- Women's PGA C'ship: DNP
- U.S. Women's Open: DNP
- Women's British Open: T46: 2009
- Evian Championship: CUT: 2023
Medal record
Mediterranean Games
Gold medal – first place	2001 Tunis	Women's team

Carmen Alonso (born 15 July 1984) is a Spanish professional golfer who played 22 seasons on the Ladies European Tour (LET) 2005–2026. She won her maiden LET title in 2023 after 19 seasons and 251 starts.

== Amateur career ==
Alonso played on the national team and in 2000 won the European Young Masters both individually and with Spain, as Rafa Cabrera-Bello won the boys' category. She won gold at the 2001 Mediterranean Games and finished 5th at the 2000 Espirito Santo Trophy together with Tania Elósegui and Marta Prieto. She was part of the Spanish juggernaut that won the European Lady Junior's Team Championship in 2002 and 2004, and the European Ladies' Team Championship in 2003.

Alonso played in the European Junior Solheim Cup team in 2002 and won the Junior Ryder Cup with the European team in 1999 and 2002.

She won the 2000 French Ladies Amateur and in 2001 she was runner-up at the Girls Amateur Championship, and reached the semi-finals of The Women's Amateur Championship.

== Professional career ==
Alonso turned professional in late 2004 after she finished T30 at the Ladies European Tour Qualifying School. In 2006, she recorded her first top-10 finishes, T7 at both the Open de España Femenino and the Ladies English Open. In 2008, she was runner-up at the Ladies Italian Open.

In 2005, Alonso played on the Nedbank Women's Golf Tour in South Africa and recorded a T3 at the Telkom Women's Classic, and 2nd at the Nedbank Women's Masters after she lost a playoff to compatriot Maria Beautell. She played in the 2009 Women's British Open at Royal Lytham & St Annes Golf Club and made the cut.

In 2010, her sixth season on the LET, she led the LET statistics for average driving distance with an average drive of 287.85 yards.

Alonso won her first international title on the LET Access Series at the 2018 AXA Czech Ladies Challenge. She was runner-up at the 2019 Santander Golf Tour LETAS Valencia, one stroke behind Manon De Roey.

In 2021, she recorded a T4 at the Creekhouse Ladies Open, and in the team event of the Aramco Team Series – London she formed the runner-up team together with Marianne Skarpnord and Frida Gustafsson Spång.

In 2023, at 38 years old, Alonso won her maiden LET victory at the Ladies Open by Pickala Rock Resort in Finland, after 19 seasons and 251 starts.

Alonso announced her LET retirement at the 2026 La Sella Open, after 287 tournaments.

== Amateur wins ==
- 2000 European Young Masters (individual), French International Ladies Amateur Championship
- 2001 Sherry Cup

== Professional wins (3) ==
=== Ladies European Tour (1) ===
No.	Date	Tournament	Winning score	To par	Margin of victory	Runner-up
1	1 Jul 2023	Ladies Open by Pickala Rock Resort	64-69-68=201	−15	1 stroke	(Sweden) Johanna Gustavsson

=== LET Access Series (1) ===
No.	Date	Tournament	Winning score	To par	Margin of victory	Runners-up	Ref
1	16 Sep 2018	AXA Czech Ladies Challenge	70-66-69=205	−11	3 strokes	(England) Inci Mehmet (Czech Republic) Tereza Melecká (a)	

LET Acess Series playoff record (0–1)

No.	Year	Tournament	Opponent	Result	Ref
1	2012	Banesto Tour Valencia^{1}	(England) Holly Clyburn	Lost to par on second extra hole	

^{1} Co-sanctioned with the Banesto Tour

=== Banesto Tour (1) ===
No.	Date	Tournament	Winning score	To par	Margin of victory	Runner-up	Ref
1	1 Oct 2010	Banesto Tour Zaragoza	68-71=139	−5	Playoff	(Spain) Itziar Elguezábal	

Banesto Tour playoff record (1–1)

No.	Year	Tournament	Opponent	Result	Ref
1	2010	Banesto Tour Zaragoza	(Spain) Itziar Elguezábal	Won on first extra hole	
2	2012	Banesto Tour Valencia^{1}	(England) Holly Clyburn	Lost to par on second extra hole	

^{1} Co-sanctioned with the LET Access Series

== Playoff record ==
Nedbank Women's Golf Tour playoff record (0–1)

No.	Year	Tournament	Opponent	Result	Ref
1	2005	Nedbank Women's SA Masters	(Spain) Maria Beautell	Lost to par on first extra hole	

== Team appearances ==
Amateur

- European Young Masters (representing Spain): 2000 (winners)
- Junior Ryder Cup (representing the Continent of Europe): 1999 (winners), 2002 (winners)
- Junior Solheim Cup (representing the Continent of Europe): 2002
- Espirito Santo Trophy (representing Spain): 2000
- European Lady Junior's Team Championship (representing Spain): 2002 (winners), 2004 (winners)
- European Ladies' Team Championship (representing Spain): 2001, 2003 (winners)
