= Martina Eberl =

German professional golfer (born 1981)

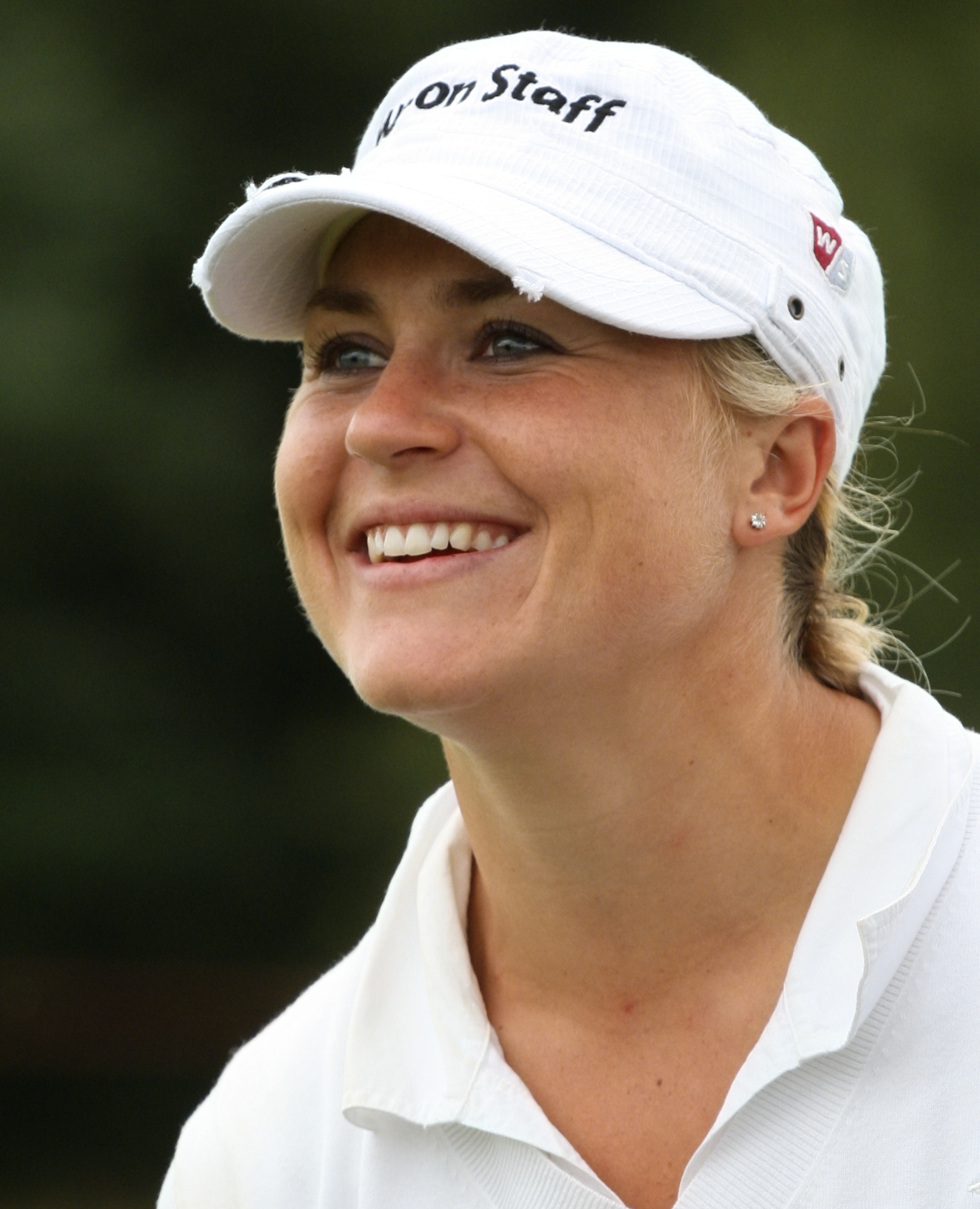
- Martina Eberl at the 2009 Women's British Open

Personal information
- Full name: Martina Eberl-Ellis
- Nationality: Germany
- Born: 29 June 1981 (age 45)
- Height: 5 ft 9 in (1.75 m)
- Children: 2

Career
- Sport: Golf
- Turned professional: 2002
- Former tour: Ladies European Tour (joined 2003)
- Professional wins: 4

Number of wins by tour
- Ladies European Tour: 3
- Other: 1

Best results in LPGA major championships
- Chevron Championship: DNP
- Women's PGA C'ship: DNP
- U.S. Women's Open: WD: 2009
- Women's British Open: T42: 2009

Martina Eberl (born 29 June 1981) is a German professional golfer. She played on the Ladies European Tour (LET) between 2003 and 2012 and won four tournaments.

In addition to her four LET wins, Eberl was runner-up at the 2004 BMW Ladies Italian Open, one stroke behind Ana Belén Sánchez, and again at the 2006 Ladies English Open, one stroke behind Cecilia Ekelundh, and in 2008 lost a playoff to Lotta Wahlin at the Wales Ladies Championship of Europe. She was also runner-up at the 2008 European Nations Cup, partnering with Anja Monke. Eberl finished third on the 2008 Order of Merit.

After retiring from tour, she became a golf coach at Golf Club Eschenried in Munich.

== Amateur wins ==
- 2002 Spanish International Ladies Amateur Championship

== Professional wins ==
=== Ladies European Tour wins (3) ===
No.	Date	Tournament	Winning score	Margin of victory	Runner-up
1	7 Oct 2007	Madrid Ladies Masters	−13 (69-68-69=206)	1 stroke	(Sweden) Sophie Gustafson
2	7 Sep 2008	Nykredit Masters	−14 (66-73-66=205)	1 stroke	(England) Mel Reid
3	2 Oct 2008	BMW Ladies Italian Open	−9 (65-74-67-69=275)	5 strokes	(Spain) Carmen Alonso

=== Other wins (1) ===
- 2007 The 18 Finest (unofficial tournament sanctioned by the Ladies European Tour)

== Team appearances ==
Amateur

- European Ladies' Team Championship (representing Germany): 1999, 2001
- Espirito Santo Trophy (representing Germany): 1998, 2000, 2002
- Junior Ryder Cup (representing Europe): 1999 (winners)
- European Lady Junior's Team Championship (representing Germany): 2002
