= 2007 Ladies European Tour =

Golf tournament series

2007 Ladies European Tour season
- Duration: January 2007 – December 2007
- Number of official events: 24
- Order of Merit: (Sweden) Sophie Gustafson
- Player of the Year: (West Germany) Bettina Hauert
- Rookie of the Year: (Sweden) Louise Stahle
- Lowest stroke average: (Sweden) Sophie Gustafson

The 2007 Ladies European Tour was a series of golf tournaments for elite female golfers from around the world which took place from January through December 2007. The tournaments were sanctioned by the Ladies European Tour (LET).

The tour featured 24 official money events with prize money totalling more than €10.5 million, as well as the Women's World Cup of Golf and the biannual Solheim Cup. Sophie Gustafson won the Order of Merit, while Bettina Hauert was voted Player's Player of the Year. Louise Stahle won Rookie of the Year honours, finishing 23rd in the Order of Merit.

== Tournament results ==
The table below shows the 2007 schedule. The numbers in brackets after the winners' names show the number of career wins they had on the Ladies European Tour up to and including that event. This is only shown for members of the tour.

Key

Major championships
LET majors in **bold**
Regular events
Team championships

Dates	Tournament	Location	Winner	Purse (€)	Notes
21 Jan	Women's World Cup of Golf	South Africa	(Paraguay) Julieta Granada and Celeste Troche (n/a)	$1,400,000	Team event co-sanctioned by the five main women's tours; unofficial prize money
4 Feb	Women's Australian Open	Australia	(Australia) Karrie Webb (n/a)	A$500,000	Co-sanctioned by the ALPG Tour
11 Feb	ANZ Ladies Masters	Australia	(Australia) Karrie Webb (n/a)	A$800,000	Co-sanctioned by the ALPG Tour
6 May	Tenerife Ladies Open	Spain	(Australia) Nikki Garrett (1)	275,000	
13 May	Open De España Femenino	Spain	(Australia) Nikki Garrett (2)	275,000	
20 May	Ladies Swiss Open	Switzerland	(Germany) Bettina Hauert (1)	525,000	
26 May	BMW Ladies Italian Open	Italy	(England) Trish Johnson (18)	400,000	
3 Jun	Northern Ireland Ladies Open	Northern Ireland	(England) Lisa Hall (2)	200,000	
10 Jun	KLM Ladies Open	Netherlands	(France) Gwladys Nocera (4)	180,000	
17 Jun	Catalonia Ladies Masters	Spain	(South Africa) Ashleigh Simon (1)	200,000	
24 Jun	Vediorbis Open de France	France	(Sweden) Linda Wessberg (2)	340,000	
1 Jul	Ladies Open of Portugal	Portugal	(France) Sophie Giquel (1)	200,000	
8 Jul	Ladies English Open	England	(Wales) Becky Brewerton (1)	165,000	
28 Jul	**Evian Masters**	France	(United States) **Natalie Gulbis** (n/a)	$3,000,000	Co-sanctioned by the LPGA Tour
5 Aug	**Ricoh Women's British Open**	Scotland	(Mexico) **Lorena Ochoa** (n/a)	$2,000,000	Co-sanctioned by the LPGA Tour
12 Aug	Scandinavian TPC hosted by Annika	Sweden	(Scotland) Catriona Matthew (2)	525,000	
19 Aug	Wales Ladies Championship of Europe	Wales	(Australia) Joanne Mills (2)	£350,000	
26 Aug	SAS Masters	Norway	(Norway) Suzann Pettersen (2)	200,000	
2 Sep	Finnair Masters	Finland	(Germany) Bettina Hauert (2)	200,000	
9 Sep	Nykredit Masters	Denmark	(England) Lisa Hall (3)	200,000	
16 Sep	Solheim Cup	Sweden	United States	–	Team event; no prize money
22 Sep	De Vere Ladies Scottish Open	Scotland	(Sweden) Sophie Gustafson (12)	200,000	
30 Sep	Austrian Ladies Open	Austria	(England) Laura Davies (36)	250,000	
6 Oct	Madrid Ladies Masters	Spain	(Germany) Martina Eberl (1)	400,000	
8 Dec	EMAAR-MGF Ladies Masters	India	(France) Gwladys Nocera (5)	200,000	
16 Dec	Dubai Ladies Masters	U.A.E.	(Sweden) Annika Sörenstam (13)	500,000	

== Order of Merit rankings ==
Rank	Player	Country	Earnings (€)
1	Sophie Gustafson	Sweden	222,081
2	Bettina Hauert	Germany	219,863
3	Gwladys Nocera	France	207,825
4	Trish Johnson	England	202,468
5	Maria Hjorth	Sweden	198,283
6	Catriona Matthew	Scotland	178,751
7	Annika Sörenstam	Sweden	170,795
8	Linda Wessberg	Sweden	158,960
9	Martina Eberl	Germany	155,474
10	Joanne Mills	Australia	150,809

== See also ==
- 2007 LPGA Tour
- 2007 in golf
