= 2001 European Ladies' Team Championship =

Golf competition

Tournament information
- Dates: 10–14 July 2001
- Location: Meis, Galicia, Spain; 42°31′N 8°42′W
- Course: Campo de Golf de Meis
- Organized by: European Golf Association
- Format: 36 holes stroke play Knock-out match-play

Statistics
- Par: 72
- Field: 18 teams 108 players

Champion
- Sweden; Kristina Engström, Anna Gertsson, Mikaela Parmlid, Nina Reis, Helena Svensson, Linda Wessberg
- Qualification round: 750 (+30)
- Location in Europe Location in Spain

The 2001 European Ladies' Team Championship took place in 10–14 July at Campo de Golf de Meis in the province of Pontevedra, . It was the 22nd women's golf amateur European Ladies' Team Championship.

== Venue ==
The hosting public course, in the municipality Meis, 60 kilometres north-east of the city of Pontevedra, Galicia, Spain, opened its 18 holes in 2000. It is situated on the Monte Castrove, a hilly high plateau, in a light stone pine forest, with widespread fairways framed by stone pines and with six lakes around the course.

Due to heavy fog on the course, play was cancelled the scheduled last two days of the tournament.

== Format ==
All participating teams played two qualification rounds of stroke-play with six players, counted the five best scores for each team.

The eight best teams formed flight A, intended to play knock-out match-play over the next three days. The teams were seeded based on their positions after the stroke-play. The first placed team was drawn to play the quarter-final against the eight placed team, the second against the seventh, the third against the sixth and the fourth against the fifth. In each match between two nation teams, two 18-hole foursome games and five 18-hole single games were played. Teams were allowed to switch players during the team matches, selecting other players in to the afternoon single games after the morning foursome games. Games all square after 18 holes were declared halved, if the team match was already decided.

The eight teams placed 9–16 in the qualification stroke-play formed flight B, to play similar knock-out match-play, with one foursome game and four single games, to decide their final positions.

The two teams placed 17–18 in the qualification stroke-play formed flight C, to meet each other, with one foursome game and four single games, to decide their final positions.

Due to the weather conditions, heavy fog over the golf course, on the days of the intended semi finals and final, the final order of the teams were decided based on the quarter-finals and the qualification stroke-play competition.

== Teams ==
18 nation teams contested the event. Greece took part for the first time. Each team consisted of six players.

Players in the leading teams

Country	Players
Denmark	Mette Buus, Anne N. Hansen, Karen Margrethe Juul, Rikke Rasmussen, Lisa Holm Sørensen, Carina Vagner
England	Kim Andrew, Emma Duggleby, Kirsty Fisher, Sarah Heath, Rebecca Hudson, Fame More
Finland	Sonja Halmela, Nina Isaksson, Pia Koivuranta, Jenni Kuosa, Hanna-Leena Salonen, Ursula Tuutti
France	Maïtena Alsuguren, Sophie Giquel, Gwladys Nocera, Mahault Passerat de Silans, Audrey Riguelle, Béatrice Soubiron
Germany	Martina Eberl, Britta Echterling, Bettina Hauert, Miriam Hiller, Andrea Lanz, Denise Simon
Ireland	Alison Coffey, Claire Coughlan, Martina Gillen, Hazel Kavanagh, Sinead Keane, Deirdre Smith
Italy	Giuliana Colavito, Virginia Costa, Diana Luna, Barbara Paruscio, Federica Piovano, Monica Quartana
Netherlands	Bianca Dekker, Annemieke Goederen, Charlotte Heeres, Joan van der Kraats, Dewi Claire Schreefel, Eline Zoethout
Scotland	Claire Hargan, Anne Laing, Vikki Laing, Lesley MacKay, Laura Moffat, Linzl Morton
Spain	Carmen Alonso, Emma Cabrera-Bello, Nuria Clau, Inéz Díaz-Negrete,Tania Elósegui, Marta Prieto
Sweden	Kristina Engström, Anna Gertsson, Mikaela Parmlid, Nina Reis, Helena Svensson, Linda Wessberg
Wales	Becky Brewerton, Anna Highgate, Sarah Jones, Sara Mounford, Kate Phillips, Elenor Pilgrim

Other participating teams

Country
Belgium
Czech Republic
Greece
Iceland
Norway
Switzerland

== Winners ==
Team Sweden lead the opening 36-hole qualifying competition, with a score of 30 over par 750, one stroke ahead of host nation team Spain.

Individual leader in the 36-hole stroke-play competition was Rebecca Hudson, England with a score of 2 over par 146, one stroke ahead of Vikki Laing, Scotland.

Due to unplayable conditions the last two days of the tournament, the four semi finalist teams were ranked based on their qualifying round standings, why team Sweden was declared champions, earning their fourth title and also their fourth title in the last eleven championships. Spain earned the silver and Scotland the bronze. The other teams were ranked in a similar way.

== Results ==
Qualification round

Team standings

Place	Country	Score	To par
1	Sweden	378-372=750	+30
2	Spain	377-374=751	+31
3	England	377-375=752	+32
4	Scotland	383-379=762	+42
5	France	379-386=765	+45
6	Italy	381-385=766	+46
7	Germany	386-381=767	+47
8	Wales	385-387=772	+52
9	Denmark	390-385=775	+55
10	Ireland	396-391=787	+67
11	Netherlands	401-392=793	+73
12	Finland	398-397=795	+75
13	Switzerland	406-391=797	+77
14	Belgium	411-400=811	+91
T15	Iceland *	408-408=816	+96
T15	Czech Republic	416-400=816	+96
17	Norway	412-406=818	+98
18	Greece	440-450=890	+170

* Note: In the event of a tie the order was determined by the better total non-counting scores.

Individual leaders

Place	Player	Country	Score	To par
1	Rebecca Hudson	England	74-72=146	+2
2	Vikki Laing	Scotland	73-74=147	+3
T3	Carmen Alonso	Spain	74-74=148	+4
T3	Martina Eberl	Germany	74-74=148	+4
T3	Anna Gertsson	Sweden	75-73=148	+4
T3	Barbara Paruscio	Italy	73-75=148	+4
T7	Becky Brewerton	Wales	74-75=149	+5
T7	Nuria Clau	Spain	71-78=149	+5
T7	Federica Piovano	Italy	75-74=149	+5
10	Linda Wessberg	Sweden	75-78=150	+6

Note: There was no official award for the lowest individual score.

Flight A

Bracket

Quarter finals
Spain	5
Germany	2
Italy	4
England	3
Scotland	4.5
France	2.5
Sweden	6
Wales	1

Semi finals cancelled *
Spain
Italy
Sweden
Scotland

Final cancelled *

* Note: Semi finals, final and bronze match cancelled due to unplayable weather conditions.

Final standings

Place	Country
1st place, gold medalist(s)	Sweden
2nd place, silver medalist(s)	Spain
3rd place, bronze medalist(s)	Scotland
4	Italy
5	England
6	France
7	Germany
8	Wales
9	Denmark
10	Ireland
11	Netherlands
12	Finland
13	Switzerland
14	Belgium
15	Czech Republic
16	Iceland
17	Norway
18	Greece

== See also ==
- Espirito Santo Trophy – biennial world amateur team golf championship for women organized by the International Golf Federation.
- European Amateur Team Championship – European amateur team golf championship for men organised by the European Golf Association.
