= Eleanor Pilgrim =

Welsh professional golfer

Personal information
- Nationality: Wales
- Born: 15 February 1977 (age 49) Newport, Wales
- Height: 1.65 m (5 ft 5 in)

Career
- Sport: Golf
- College: Northern Arizona University
- Turned professional: 2002
- Current tour: Ladies European Tour (joined 2003)

Best results in LPGA major championships
- Chevron Championship: DNP
- Women's PGA C'ship: DNP
- U.S. Women's Open: DNP
- Women's British Open: CUT: 2004, 2005, 2006

Eleanor Pilgrim (born 15 February 1977) is a Welsh professional golfer. She is a member of the Ladies European Tour.

== Early life and amateur career ==
In 1977, Pilgrim was born in Newport, Wales. She was a member of the Welsh Amateur International from 1995 to 2002. In 1997 and 2002, she was Welsh Ladies' Amateur Champion. She was also the first reserve for the 2002 GB&I Curtis Cup team.

She played her collegiate golf at Northern Arizona University gaining a Bachelor of Arts degree. She won the 1996 Idaho State Invitational and 1998 Lumberjack Invitational and was Big Sky Conference champion in 1996 and 1998. She was 1996 Big Sky All-Academic and All-Big Sky Conference 1996–1998. She played in the 2002 Weetabix Challenge where members of the Ladies European Tour take on the Great Britain and Ireland elite amateur squad and won the Sunningdale Critchley Salver.

== Professional career ==
In 2002, she turned professional. Having finished in 8th place at the 2002 qualifying school, Pilgrim made her professional debut on the Ladies European Tour in the 2003 season. In 11 starts, her best finish was a tie for twelfth at her home Wales WPGA Championship.

She had to return to qualifying school after a torrid 2004 season to retain her card. She had her best career finish the following 2005 season when she lost the KLM Ladies Open to Virginie Lagoutte at the second extra hole.

== Team appearances ==
Amateur

- European Ladies' Team Championship (representing Wales): 1997, 1999, 2001
