= Helena Svensson (golfer) =

Swedish golfer

Personal information
- Nationality: Sweden
- Born: 21 March 1979 (age 47) Lagan, Sweden

Career
- Sport: Golf
- Turned professional: 2002
- Former tour: Ladies European Tour (joined 2003)
- Professional wins: 3

Achievements and awards
- Sweden PGA Future Fund Award: 2003

Helena Svensson (born 21 March 1979) is a retired Swedish professional golfer who played on the Ladies European Tour. She won the 2001 European Ladies' Team Championship and the 2003 Acer South African Women's Open.

== Career ==
As an amateur, Svensson was part of the National Team and represented Sweden at the 1999 European Ladies' Team Championship where her team finished fifth, and again in 2001 when she won together with teammates Kristina Engström, Anna Gertsson, Mikaela Parmlid, Nina Reis and Linda Wessberg. She again represented her country at the 2002 Espirito Santo Trophy, together with Karin Sjödin and Mikaela Parmlid.

Svensson finished runner-up at the 2002 Kalmar Ladies Open on the Swedish Golf Tour, after losing a playoff to Australian Susie Mathews. Mathews won after eight playoff holes, while home player Åsa Gottmo was eliminated after four. Svensson won the 2002 Skandia PGA Open a few weeks later, a tournament she came close to winning again in 2004, finishing a stroke behind winner Linda Wessberg.

Svensson finished fourth at the LET Q-School in 2002, turned professional, and joined the 2003 Ladies European Tour.

In January 2003, she received the PGA Future Fund Award from the Swedish Golf Federation as that year's most promising Swedish international tour rookie alongside Fredrik Widmark.

In March 2003, she won the Acer SA Women's Open at Royal Johannesburg & Kensington Golf Club. She finished 94th on the LET Order of Merit both in 2003 and 2004.

== Professional wins (3) ==
=== Sunshine Ladies Tour (1) ===
- 2003 Acer South African Women's Open

=== Swedish Golf Tour (2) ===
No.	Date	Tournament	Winning score	To par	Margin of victory	Runner(s)-up	Ref
1	24 Aug 2002	Skandia PGA Open (as an amateur)	71-73-74=218	+2	1 stroke	(Sweden) Pia Koivuranta (Sweden) Nina Reis	
2	15 Jul 2006	IT-Arkitekterna Ladies Open	71-76-73=220	+1	1 stroke	(Sweden) Eva Bjärvall (Sweden) Golda Johansson	

== Team appearances ==
Amateur

- European Ladies' Team Championship (representing Sweden): 1999, 2001 (winners)
- Espirito Santo Trophy (representing Sweden): 2002
