= Bloor Homes Eastleigh Classic =

Tournament information
- Location: Eastleigh, Hampshire, England
- Established: 1984
- Course: Fleming Park Golf Club
- Par: 65 (34–31)
- Tour: Ladies European Tour
- Format: 72-hole Stroke play
- Month played: July
- Final year: 1991

Tournament record score
- Aggregate: 249 Trish Johnson, Dale Reid
- To par: −11 as above

Final champion
- (Scotland) Dale Reid

The Bloor Homes Eastleigh Classic was a women's professional golf tournament on the Ladies European Tour. It was first played in 1984 and held annually until 1991.

The tournament was played on the par–65 (34–31) municipal course Fleming Park GC, Eastleigh, Hampshire, England, which closed permanently in 2008.

Jane Connachan recorded a 58 in the first round and Dale Reid recorded a 58 in the final round of the 1991 tournament, Ladies European Tour records as lowest rounds, as is Dale Reid's 1991 and Trish Johnson's 1990 72–hole raw score of 249.

== Winners ==
Year	Winner	Score	Margin of victory	Runner(s)-up
Bloor Homes Eastleigh Classic
1991	(Scotland) Dale Reid	249	8 strokes	(England) Diane Barnard
1990	(England) Trish Johnson	249	5 strokes	(Australia) Corinne Dibnah
1989	(England) Debbie Dowling		Playoff	(South Africa) Rae Hast (Scotland) Cathy Panton (United States) Melissa McNamara
1988	(Australia) Corinne Dibnah		1 stroke	(Australia) Dennise Hutton (United States) Dana Lofland
1987	(England) Trish Johnson		11 strokes	(Australia) Corinne Dibnah
1986	(England) Debbie Dowling		6 strokes	(England) Alison Nicholas
JS Bloor Eastleigh Classic
1985	(England) Christine Sharp		1 stroke	(England) Kitrina Douglas
1984	(Scotland) Dale Reid		8 strokes	(England) Debbie Dowling

== See also ==
- Ladies European Tour records
