= 1999 European Ladies' Team Championship =

Golf competition

Tournament information
- Dates: 6–10 July 1999
- Location: Saint-Germain-en-Laye, France; 48.91833°N 2.05733°E
- Course: Golf de Saint Germain
- Organized by: European Golf Association
- Format: 36 holes stroke play Knock-out match-play

Statistics
- Par: 72
- Field: 17 teams 102 players

Champion
- France; Maïtena Alsuguren, Stéphanie Arricau, Virginie Auffret, Karine Icher, Marine Monnet, Gwladys Nocera
- Qualification round: 716 (−4); Final match 4 1/2–2 1/2

Location map
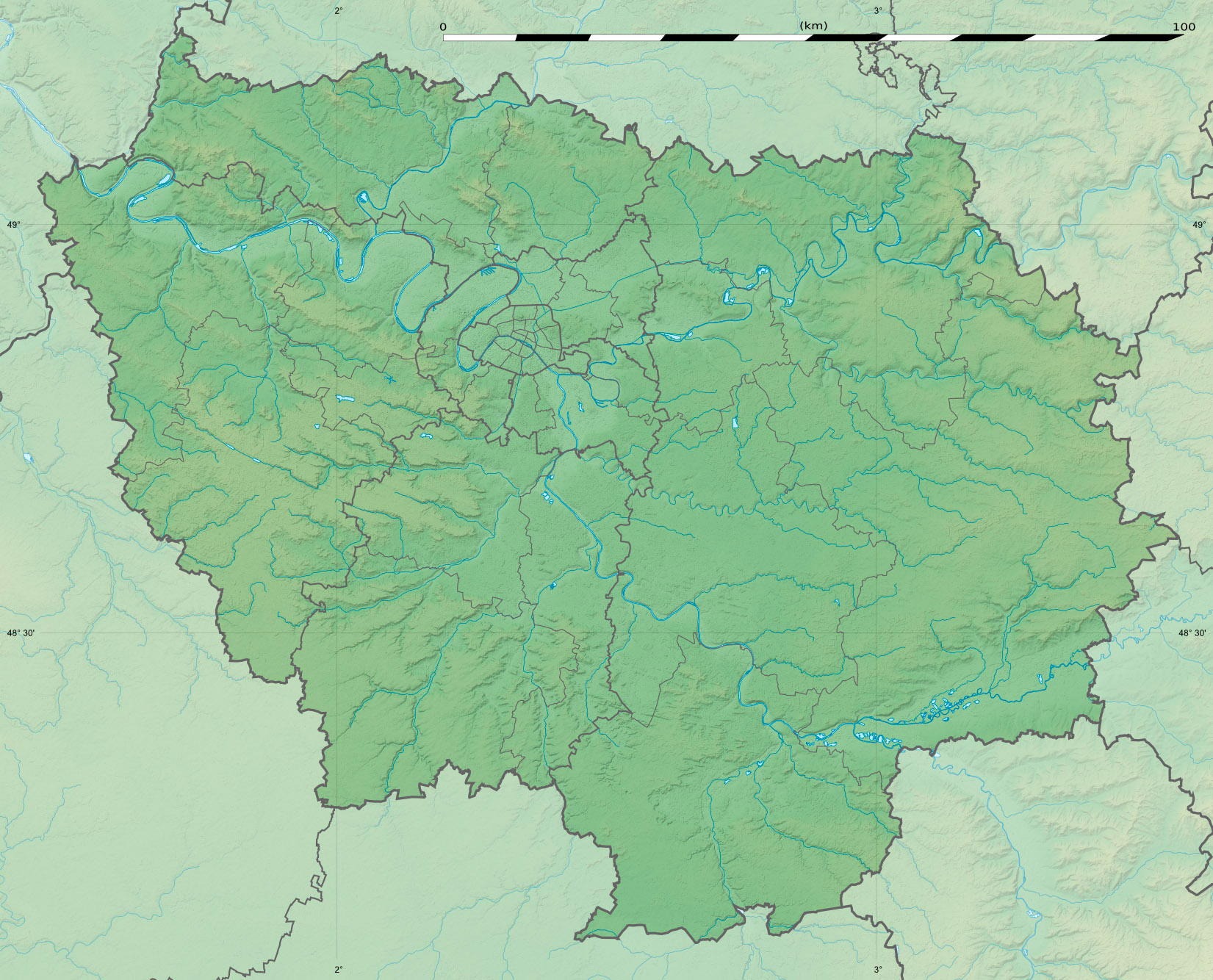
- Location in Europe Location in France Location in Île-de-France

The 1999 European Ladies' Team Championship took place 6–10 July at Golf de Saint Germain in Saint-Germain-en-Laye, France. It was the 21st women's golf amateur European Ladies' Team Championship.

== Venue ==
The course, situated 25 kilometres west of the city center of Paris, France, was designed by Harry Colt and opened in 1922.

The championship course was set up with par 72.

== Format ==
All participating teams played two qualification rounds of stroke-play with six players, counted the five best scores for each team.

The eight best teams formed flight A, in knock-out match-play over the next three days. The teams were seeded based on their positions after the stroke-play. The first placed team was drawn to play the quarter-final against the eight placed team, the second against the seventh, the third against the sixth and the fourth against the fifth. In each match between two nation teams, two 18-hole foursome games and five 18-hole single games were played. Teams were allowed to switch players during the team matches, selecting other players in to the afternoon single games after the morning foursome games. Games all square after 18 holes were declared halved, if the team match was already decided.

The six teams placed 9–14 in the qualification stroke-play formed flight B, to play similar knock-out match-play, with one foursome game and four single games, to decide their final positions.

The three teams placed 15–17 in the qualification stroke-play formed flight C, to meet each other, with one foursome game and four single games, to decide their final positions.

== Teams ==
17 nation teams contested the event. Each team consisted of six players.

Players in the leading teams

| Country | Players |
|---|---|
| Denmark | Helle Gram, Karen Margrethe Juul, Anne Larsson, Amanda Mooltke-Leth, Rikke Rasmussen, Carina Vagner |
| England | Kim Andrew, Fiona Brown, Emma Duggleby, Kirsty Fisher, Rebecca Hudson, Kerry Smith |
| Finland | Nina Isaksson, Minna Kaarnalahti, Pia Koivuranta, Hanna-Riikka Kuitunen, Niina Laitinen, Ursula Tuutti |
| France | Maïtena Alsuguren, Stéphanie Arricau, Virginie Auffret, Karine Icher, Marine Monnet, Gwladys Nocera |
| Germany | Martina Eberl, Miriam Hiller, Andrea Lanz, Miriam Nagl, Verena Scholz, Nicole Stillig |
| Ireland | Alison Coffey, Claire Coughlan, Emma Dickson, Suzanne O'Brien, Eileen Rose McDaid Power, Oonagh Purfield |
| Italy | Isabelle Calogero, Monica Cosenza, Barbara Paruscio, Federica Piovano, Sofia Sandolo, Giulia Sergas |
| Netherlands | Annemieke Goederen, Joan van der Kraats, Marcella Neggers, Nienke Nijenhuis, Kim van Tienhoven, Marieke Zelsman |
| Norway | Line Berg, Monica Gundersrud, Camilla G. Hilland, Cathrine Norderhaug, Suzanne Pettersen, Marianne Ruud |
| Scotland | Anne Laing, Laura Moffat, Hilary Monoghan, Lesley Nicholson, Alison Rose, Jayne Smith |
| Spain | Maria Beautell, Macarena Campomanes, Nuria Clau, Itziar Elguezabal, Tania Elósegui, Marta Prieto |
| Sweden | Susanna Berglund, Maria Bodén, Kristina Engström, Anna Jonsson, Jessica Lindbergh, Helena Svensson |
| Switzerland | Barbara Albisetti, Nora Angehrrn, Tanja Arnold, Niloufar Azam, Alexandra Gasser, Sheila Lee |
| Wales | Becky Brewerton, Louise Davis, Natalie Evans, Becky Morgan, Elenor Pilgrim, Vicki Thomas |

Other participating teams

Country
Austria
Belgium
Czech Republic

== Winners ==
Host nation France lead the opening 36-hole qualifying competition, with a score of 4 under par 716, 20 strokes ahead of team England.

Individual leader in the 36-hole stroke-play competition was Maïtena Alsuguren, France, with a score of 5 under par 139, one stroke ahead of Maria Bodén, Sweden.

Team France won the championship, beating England 4 1/2–2 1/2 in the final and earned their sixth title. Team Germany earned third place, beating Netherlands 5–2 in the bronze match.

== Results ==
Qualification round

Team standings

| Place | Country | Score | To par |
|---|---|---|---|
| 1 | France | 362-354=716 | −4 |
| 2 | England | 372-364=736 | +16 |
| 3 | Italy | 371-366=737 | +17 |
| T4 | Sweden * | 382-365=747 | +27 |
| T4 | Germany | 373-374=747 | +27 |
| 6 | Netherlands | 376-375=751 | +31 |
| 7 | Spain | 379-373=752 | +32 |
| 8 | Ireland | 384-370=754 | +34 |
| 9 | Wales | 380-378=758 | +38 |
| 10 | Denmark | 387-381=768 | +48 |
| T11 | Scotland * | 387-383=770 | +50 |
| T11 | Switzerland | 389-381=770 | +50 |
| T13 | Norway * | 388-386=774 | +54 |
| T13 | Finland | 392-382=774 | +54 |
| 15 | Austria | 393-394=777 | +57 |
| 16 | Belgium | 406-394=800 | +80 |
| 17 | Czech Republic | 405-420=825 | +105 |

* Note: In the event of a tie the order was determined by the better total non-counting scores.

Individual leaders

| Place | Player | Country | Score | To par |
|---|---|---|---|---|
| 1 | Maïtena Alsuguren | France | 70-69=139 | −5 |
| 2 | Maria Bodén | Sweden | 72-68=140 | −4 |
| T3 | Marine Monnet | France | 74-68=142 | −2 |
| T3 | Becky Morgan | Wales | 70-72=142 | −2 |
| T5 | Miriam Nagl | Germany | 73-70=143 | −1 |
| T5 | Federica Piovano | Italy | 72-71=143 | −1 |
| T7 | Helena Svensson | Sweden | 73-72=145 | +1 |
| T7 | Gwladys Nocera | France | 72-73=145 | +1 |
| T9 | Virginie Auffret | France | 73-73=146 | +2 |
| T9 | Karine Icher | France | 73-73=146 | +2 |
| T9 | Suzanne O'Brien | Ireland | 74-72=146 | +2 |
| T9 | Giulia Sergas | Italy | 70-76=146 | +2 |
| T9 | Kerry Smith | England | 73-73=146 | +2 |
| T9 | Barbara Paruscio | Italy | 74-72=146 | +2 |

Note: There was no official award for the lowest individual score.

Flight A

Bracket

Quarter finals
England | 4
Spain | 3
Netherlands | 4
Italy | 3
Germany | 5
Sweden | 2
France | 4
Ireland | 3

Semi finals
England | 4
Netherlands | 3
France | 5
Germany | 2

Final
France | 4.5
England | 2.5
Bronze match
Germany | 5
Netherlands | 2

Elimination matches
Sweden | 4
Ireland | 3
Italy | 4
Spain | 3

Match for 5th place
Sweden | 4
Italy | 3
Match for 7th place
Spain | 6
Ireland | 1

Final games

| France | England |
| 4.5 | 2.5 |
| Alsuguren / Monnet 2 & 1 | Andrew / Brown |
| Arricau / Icher 3 & 2 | Duggleby / Hudson |
| Marine Monnet 6 & 5 | Fiona Brown |
| Stéphanie Arricau AS * | Rebecca Hudson AS * |
| Virgine Auffret 3 & 2 | Kirsty Fisher |
| Karine Icher | Emma Duggleby 16th hole ** |
| Maitena Alsuguren | Kim Andrew 16th hole ** |

* Note: Game all square after 18 holes declared halved, since team match already decided.

** Note: English player declared winner after 16th hole, since team match already decided.

Flight B

Bracket

Round 1
Finland | 3
Scotland | 2
Switzerland | 3
Norway | 2

Round 2
Finland | 3
Denmark | 2
Switzerland | 3
Wales | 2

Match for 9th place
Switzerland | 3
Finland | 2
Match for 11th place
Wales | 3
Denmark | 2

Round 1

Match for 13th place
Scotland | 3
Norway | 2

Flight C

Team matches

Round 1
Belgium | 3
Czech Republic | 2

Round 2
Austria | 5
Czech Republic | 0
Round 3
Austria | 4
Belgium | 1

Final standings

| Place | Country |
|---|---|
| 1st place, gold medalist(s) | France |
| 2nd place, silver medalist(s) | England |
| 3rd place, bronze medalist(s) | Germany |
| 4 | Netherlands |
| 5 | Sweden |
| 6 | Italy |
| 7 | Spain |
| 8 | Ireland |
| 9 | Switzerland |
| 10 | Finland |
| 11 | Wales |
| 12 | Denmark |
| 13 | Scotland |
| 14 | Norway |
| 15 | Austria |
| 16 | Belgium |
| 17 | Czech Republic |

== See also ==
- Espirito Santo Trophy – biennial world amateur team golf championship for women organized by the International Golf Federation.
- European Amateur Team Championship – European amateur team golf championship for men organised by the European Golf Association.
