= Jane Connachan =

Scottish golfer

Jane McGrath Connachan
Personal information
- Nationality: Scotland
- Born: 25 February 1964 (age 62) Prestonpans, Scotland

Career
- Sport: Golf
- Turned professional: 1984
- Former tour: Ladies European Tour (1984–1991)
- Professional wins: 5

Number of wins by tour
- Ladies European Tour: 5

Jane Connachan (born 25 February 1964) is a Scottish professional golfer who played on the Ladies European Tour.

== Amateur career ==
Connachan was considered a child prodigy, playing competitive golf constantly since the age of 10, and in the 17 years until she suddenly retired at age 27, accumulated an almost unparalleled record. She first played for Scotland when she was 15. She won the Australian Girls' Amateur and the Girls Amateur Championship, twice. At 18, she was Scottish champion and holder of the British Strokeplay title. She won the Girl's Home Internationals, Women's Home Internationals and the Vagliano Trophy, and appeared twice at the Espirito Santo Trophy, and twice in the Curtis Cup against the Americans, before turning pro at the end of 1983.

== Professional career ==
Connachan joined the Ladies European Tour in 1984 and won in her rookie year, won twice in the following year, and went on to win a total of five tournaments between 1984 and 1989, before deciding to retire in August 1991.

At the Bloor Homes Eastleigh Classic in July 1991, in one of her last tournaments before retiring, she recorded a 58 in the first round, a Ladies European Tour record as the lowest raw score ever, only equaled by Dale Reid and Trish Johnson at the same tournament.

== Amateur wins ==
- 1980 Girls Amateur Championship
- 1981 Girls Amateur Championship
- 1982 Australian Girls' Amateur, Scottish Women's Amateur Championship, Ladies' British Open Amateur Stroke Play Championship
- 1983 Helen Holm Scottish Women's Open Stroke Play Championship

== Professional wins ==
=== Ladies European Tour wins (5) ===
- 1984 (1) Colt Cars Jersey Open
- 1985 (2) British Olivetti Tournament, 415/Vantage WPGA Matchplay Championship
- 1987 (1) British Olivetti Tournament
- 1989 (1) Ladies European Open

== Team appearances ==
Amateur

- Girl's Home Internationals (representing Scotland): 1976 (winners), 1977, 1978, 1979, 1980, 1981
- Women's Home Internationals (representing Scotland): 1979 (winners), 1980, 1981 (winners), 1982, 1983
- Curtis Cup (representing Great Britain & Ireland): 1980, 1982
- Espirito Santo Trophy (representing Great Britain & Ireland): 1980, 1982
- Vagliano Trophy (representing Great Britain & Ireland): 1981, 1983 (winners)
- European Ladies' Team Championship (representing Scotland): 1983
- Commonwealth Trophy (representing Great Britain): 1983
