= Madrid Ladies Masters =

Golf tournament

Coordinates: 40.61°N 3.468°W

Tournament information
- Location: Madrid, Spain
- Established: 2007
- Courses: Casino Club de Golf Retamares
- Par: 73
- Tour: Ladies European Tour
- Format: Stroke play - 54 holes
- Prize fund: €200,000
- Month played: October
- Final year: 2009

Tournament record score
- Aggregate: 203 Azahara Muñoz and Anna Nordqvist (2009)
- To par: -16 as above

Final champion
- (Spain) Azahara Muñoz

The Madrid Ladies Masters was a professional golf tournament in Spain on the Ladies European Tour. The 54-hole event was held at the par-73 Casino Club de Golf Retamares in early October and played for three years, from 2007 to 2009.

== History ==
The 2009 event finished in a playoff between former college teammates at Arizona State, Azahara Muñoz of Spain and Anna Nordqvist of Sweden. Both had exceptional final rounds and climbed to the top of the leaderboard after 54 holes. On the first playoff hole, the par-5 18th, Muñoz rolled in a 20-foot (6 m) putt for an eagle to win her first tournament as a professional. She had turned pro only weeks earlier and was playing on a sponsor's invitation; the win earned her €50,000 and a three-year exemption on the LET.

The purse was cut in half in 2009 and the event was left off of the schedule in 2010 and 2011.

== Winners ==
Year	Winner	Country	Winning score	To par	Margin of victory	Runner-up	Purse (€)	Winner's share (€)
2009	Azahara Muñoz	Spain	71-68-64=203	−16	Playoff	(Sweden) Anna Nordqvist	200,000	50,000
2008	Gwladys Nocera	France	72-69-67=208	−11	4 strokes	(Spain) Paula Martí	400,000	100,000
2007	Martina Eberl	Germany	69-68-69=206	−13	1 stroke	(Sweden) Sophie Gustafson	400,000	100,000
