= Dubai Moonlight Classic =

Coordinates: 25.09°N 55.15°E

Tournament information
- Location: Dubai, United Arab Emirates
- Established: 2006
- Courses: Emirates Golf Club (Faldo course)
- Par: 72
- Length: 6,274 yards (5,737 m)
- Tour: Ladies European Tour
- Format: Stroke play
- Prize fund: €260,000
- Month played: October

Tournament record score
- Aggregate: 267 Shanshan Feng (2012); 267 Shanshan Feng (2015)
- To par: −21 as above

Current champion
- (England) Bronte Law

Location in United Arab Emirates

The Dubai Moonlight Classic is a professional golf tournament on the Ladies European Tour (LET). The event was played for the first time in October 2006. Its prize fund of €500,000 made it the fourth most valuable tournament on the LET. Between 2009 and 2020, Swiss luxury watch company Omega was the tournament's title sponsor. Promoted and organised by Golf In Dubai, the tournament is played on the Faldo course at Emirates Golf Club, which also hosts the Dubai Desert Classic on the men's European Tour.

Annika Sörenstam won the event the first two times it was played. Sörenstam beat out Karrie Webb in 2006, and in 2007 defeated Iben Tinning by two shots. The 2008 event, which was Sörenstam's final tournament before her retirement, was won by Germany's Anja Monke. The 2016 event was shortened to 54 holes when during the morning session of the first round. Maximilian Zechmann collapsed on the 13th hole (fourth hole for Anne-Lise Caudal, whom he was caddie at the tournament), dying in the hospital a short time later.

== Winners ==
Year	Dates	Champion	Country	Score	To par	Margin of victory	Purse (€)	Winner's share (€)
Dubai Moonlight Classic
2021	27–29 Oct	Bronte Law	England	68-69-64=201	−15	1 stroke	260,000	36,736
Omega Dubai Moonlight Classic
2020	4–6 Nov	Minjee Lee	Australia	72-65-69=206	−10	Playoff	260,000	36,267
2019	1–3 May	Nuria Iturrioz	Spain	67-68-71=206	−10	1 stroke	US$285,000	US$37,500
Omega Dubai Ladies Classic
2018	No tournament							
2017	6–9 Dec	Angel Yin	United States	70-71-65-67=273	−15	Playoff	500,000	75,000
Omega Dubai Ladies Masters
2016	7–10 Dec	Shanshan Feng (4)	China	72-70-64=206^	−10	2 strokes	500,000	75,000
2015	9–12 Dec	Shanshan Feng (3)	China	67-67-67-66=267	−21	12 strokes	500,000	75,000
2014	10–13 Dec	Shanshan Feng (2)	China	66-67-66-70=269	−19	5 strokes	500,000	75,000
2013	4–7 Dec	Pornanong Phatlum	Thailand	68-70-69-66=273	−15	1 stroke	500,000	75,000
2012	5–8 Dec	Shanshan Feng	China	66-65-67-69=267	−21	5 strokes	500,000	75,000
2011	14–17 Dec	Lexi Thompson	United States	70-66-70-67=273	−15	4 strokes	500,000	75,000
2010	8–11 Dec	Iben Tinning	Denmark	70-69-69-69=277	−11	2 strokes	500,000	75,000
2009	9–12 Dec	In-Kyung Kim	South Korea	70-65-67-68=270	−18	3 strokes	500,000	75,000
Dubai Ladies Masters
2008	11–14 Dec	Anja Monke	Germany	68-71-68-68=275	−13	3 strokes	500,000	75,000
2007	16–19 Dec	Annika Sörenstam (2)	Sweden	70-70-68-70=278	−10	2 strokes	500,000	75,000
2006	26–29 Oct	Annika Sörenstam	Sweden	65-68-68-69=270	−18	6 strokes	500,000	75,000

^ Shortened to 54 holes following first-round incident involving Anne-Lise Caudal, whose caddie died on her fourth hole.
