= 2000 Espirito Santo Trophy =

Tournament information
- Dates: 23–26 August
- Location: Bad Saarow, Germany; 52.239°N 14.029°E
- Course: Sporting Club Berlin (Nick Faldo Course)
- Organized by: World Amateur Golf Council
- Format: 72 holes stroke play

Statistics
- Par: 72
- Length: 6,155 yards (5,628 m)
- Field: 40 teams 120 players

Champion
- France; Maitena Alsuguren, Virginie Auffret, Karine Icher
- 580 (+4)
- Location in Germany Location in Brandenburg

The 2000 Espirito Santo Trophy took place 23–26 August at Sporting Club Berlin, on its Nick Faldo Course, in Bad Saarow, outside Berlin, Germany.

It was the 19th women's golf World Amateur Team Championship for the Espirito Santo Trophy.

The tournament was a 72-hole stroke play team event. There were a record 40 team entries, each with three players. The best two scores for each round counted towards the team total.

The French team won the Trophy for their second title, their first since France won the inaugural event on home soil in 1964. They beat team South Korea by seven strokes. South Korea took the silver, while the combined team of Great Britain and Ireland took the bronze on third place another four strokes back. The defending United States team finished 17th, their worst finish ever in the championship, having won the trophy 13 times.

The individual title went to Suzann Pettersen, Norway, whose score of 3-under-par, 285, was four strokes ahead of the nearest competitors.

== Teams ==
40 teams entered the event and completed the competition. Each team had three players, except Iceland with two players.

Country	Players
Argentina	Maria Sol Arenas, Maria Olivero, Marilu White
Australia	Helen Beatty, Rebecca Stevenson, Lindsey Wright
Austria	Lilian Mensi-Klarbach, Tina Schneeberger, Rosanna Zernatto
Belgium	Naima Ghilain, Veronique Verhaegen, Celestine De Vos
Bolivia	Ella Maria Asbun, Veronica Maldonado, Ximena Maldonado
Brazil	Maria Candida Hannemann, Maria Priscila Iida, Cristina Schmitt Baldi
Canada	Laura Henderson, Mary Ann Lapointe, Alena Sharp
Czech Republic	Marta Balková, Petra Kvidova, Jana Peterková
Chile	Maria Jose Hurtado Fabres, Gloria Soto Ferrada, Nicole Perrot Westphal
Chinese Taipei	Chin-huei Hung, Candie Kung, Nien-tzu Yu
Colombia	Cristina Baena, Marcela Gonzalez, Catalina Navarro
Croatia	Snjezana Crnoglavac, Sanja Serfezi Kelemen, Daria Zubrinic
Denmark	Amanda Moltke-Leth, Rikke Rasmussen, Carina Vagner
Ecuador	Kitty Hwang Choi, Maria Jose Ferro, Katherine Pareja
Finland	Pia Koivuranta, Hanna-Leena Salonen, Ursula Tuutti
France	Maitena Alsuguren, Virginie Auffret, Karine Icher
Germany	Martina Eberl, Miriam Nagl, Nicole Stillig
Great Britain & Ireland	Alison Coffey, Rebecca Hudson, Suzanne O'Brien
Greece	Irene Krambs, Marina Simeonoglou, Chryssi Vafiadis
Guatemala	Beatriz de Arenas, Maria Cristina Arenas, Florencia de Rolz
Iceland	Olof M. Jonsdóttir, Ragnhildur Sigurdardóttir
Indonesia	Ani Iman, Sitto Retno Purwandari, Titi Puryanti
Italy	Federica Piovano, Barbara Vianello, Veronica Zorzi
Japan	Keiko Inoue, Miho Koga, Akemi Soto
Malaysia	Lim Ai Lian, Valerie Tan Kim Lian, Koe Lai Yin
Mexico	Tanya Dergal, Lorena Ochoa, Violeta Retamoza
Netherlands	Joan van de Kraats, Nienke Nijenhuis, Dewi Claire Schreefel
New Zealand	Tina Howard, Brenda Ormsby, Debbie Smith
Norway	Line Berg, Monica Gundersund, Suzann Pettersen
Paraguay	Maria Rocio Delmas, Julieta Granada, Celeste Troche
Philippines	Maria Ruby Chico, Ria Denise Quiazon, Carmelete Villaroman
Portugal	Carolina Catanho, Carla Cruz, Rita Jordao
Puerto Rico	Karen Calvesbert, Sasha Medina, Carmen Ana Rivera
Russia	Svetlana Afanasieva, Maria Kostina, Ouliana Rotmistrova
Slovakia	Barbora Kachliková, Zuzana Mamasová, Andrea Ranusková
South Africa	Sanet Marais, Vanessa Smith, Annerie Wessels
South Korea	Kim Joo-mi, Shin Hyun-joo, Ahn Shi-hyun
Spain	Carmen Alonso, Tania Elósegui, Marta Prieto
Sweden	Susanna Berglund, Maria Bodén, Jessica Lindbergh
Switzerland	Nora Angerhn, Niloufar Azam, Sheila Lee
United States	Hilary Homeyer, Stephanie Keever, Laura Myerscough

== Results ==
Place	Country	Score	To par
1	France	146-145-142-147=580	+4
2	South Korea	144-148-147-148=587	+11
3	Great Britain & Ireland	148-147-144-152=591	+15
4	Sweden	145-148-150-149=592	+16
T5	Denmark	142-154-147-150=593	+17
T5	Spain	148-151-152-142=593	+17
7	Japan	146-147-150-151=594	+18
T8	Italy	146-148-150-151=595	+19
T8	Netherlands	150-145-149-151=595	+19
10	Australia	148-157-149-142=596	+20
T11	Chinese Taipei	150-145-154-151=600	+24
T11	Germany	148-150-152-150=600	+24
T11	Norway	147-150-150-153=600	+24
14	Mexico	148-151-152-154=605	+29
T15	Belgium	148-155-148-155=606	+30
T15	Brazil	147-145-152-162=606	+30
17	United States	152-158-149-149=608	+32
18	Canada	149-156-153-153=611	+35
19	Chile	155-155-151-152=613	+37
T20	New Zealand	146-152-161-156=615	+39
T20	South Africa	153-152-153-157=615	+39
22	Paraguay	155-154-152-156=617	+41
T23	Argentina	154-149-159-156=618	+42
T23	Switzerland	151-156-159-152=618	+42
25	Puerto Rico	150-157-156-156=619	+43
T26	Austria	157-157-155-153=622	+46
T26	Finland	157-151-159-155=622	+46
28	Czech Republic	152-155-153-163=623	+47
T29	Malaysia	157-155-159-160=631	+55
T29	Russia	156-164-159-152=631	+55
31	Philippines	156-155-165-157=633	+57
32	Iceland	157-154-164-163=638	+62
33	Indonesia	161-163-165-155=644	+68
34	Ecuador	165-152-170-164=651	+75
35	Portugal	159-169-163-164=655	+79
36	Guatemala	170-157-166-163=656	+80
37	Bolivia	166-164-171-174=675	+89
38	Greece	180-171-168-164=683	+97
39	Slovakia	182-185-183-178=728	+152
40	Croatia	183-185-176-187=731	+155

== Individual leaders ==
There was no official recognition for the lowest individual scores.

Place	Player	Country	Score	To par
1	Suzann Pettersen	Norway	69-72-71-73=285	−3
T2	Maitena Alsuguren	France	74-72-67-76=289	+1
T2	Kim Joo-mi	South Korea	73-72-72-72=289	+1
4	Karine Icher	France	72-74-75-71=292	+4
5	Rebecca Hudson	Great Britain & Ireland	73-75-71-74=293	+5
6	Candie Kung	Chinese Taipei	72-71-74-77=294	+6
7	Veronica Zorzi	Italy	73-72-74-76=295	+7
