= EMAAR-MGF Ladies Masters =

Golf tournament

Emaar-MGF Ladies Masters
Tournament information
- Location: Bangalore, India
- Established: 2007
- Course: Eagleton Golf Resort
- Par: 72
- Tour: Ladies European Tour
- Format: Stroke play
- Prize fund: €200,000
- Final year: 2007

Final champion
- (France) Gwladys Nocera
- Location in India Location in Asia Location in Karnataka

The Emaar-MGF Ladies Masters was a golf tournament on the Ladies European Tour. It was played at the Eagleton Golf Resort near Bangalore, India in 2007. The event was canceled in 2008, due to the global economic downturn, along with the corresponding men's Emaar-MGF Indian Masters.

== Winners ==
Year	Winner	Country	Score	To par	Margin of victory	Runner-up
Indian Ladies Masters
2008	Cancelled					
Emaar-MGF Ladies Masters
2007	Gwladys Nocera	France	69-69-72-71=281	–7	1 stroke	(France) Virginie Lagoutte-Clement

== See also ==
- Women's Indian Open
