= Emirates Golf Club =

Golf course in Dubai, United Arab Emirates

Coordinates: 25.08528°N 55.15984°E

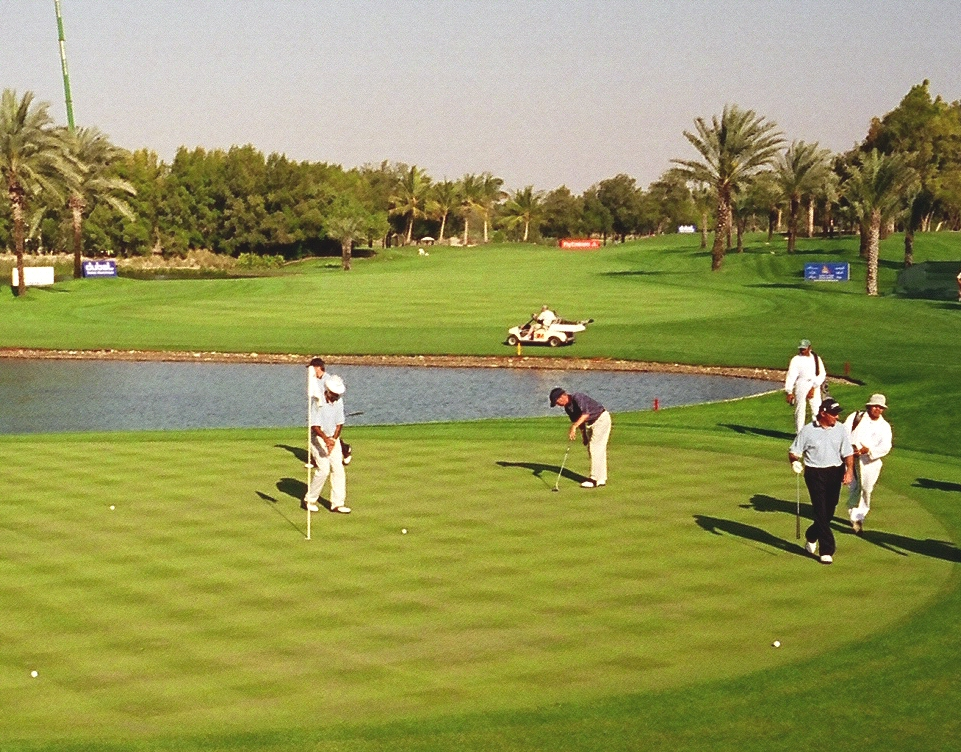
The Emirates Golf Club in 2001

Emirates Golf Club, located in Al Thanyah Third, Dubai, United Arab Emirates, is a 36-hole golf course. It was built in 1988, with the clubhouse and facilities designed and delivered by Dubai architect BSBG (Brewer Smith Brewer Group), and, is the first grass golf course in the Middle East.

== History ==
The idea of a completely grassed championship golf course in Dubai was brought about by American businessman Larry Trenary and, British businessman George Atkinson, both living in Dubai on a full-time basis. The actual golf course design was provided by Trenary's friend, the American architect Karl Litten, based in Boca Raton, Florida. Litten's first visit to Dubai was to evaluate and design a course for the property surrounding the Jebel Ali Beach Hotel, located to the south of Dubai. The hotel owner, Ahmed Baker was keen to develop the project but he needed permission from the then Ruler of Dubai, HHS Rashid bin Saeed Al Maktoum, who appeared to be in favor of the project going forward. Sheikh Rashid fell ill and was never able to give his legal support for the specific use of the land. With Sheikh Rashid's passing, the idea for a championship golf course in the Middle East was still just a dream. A few years later the project, along with another Litten design, which was much closer to the city, was presented to Sheikh Rashid's third son, HHS Mohammed bin Rashid Al Maktoum, by Steven Trutch, construction engineer to Sheikh Mohammed. During a hunting trip to Pakistan, Sheikh Mohammed discussed the idea of a grass golf course with his host, President Zia-ul-Haq, who was a keen golfer. President Zia told him it would be a good idea, making Dubai a center for the oil companies and other large companies with operations in the Middle East. Eventually Sheikh Mohammed, in order to get final approval, took the idea to his older brother, the new Ruler of Dubai, HHS Maktoum bin Rashid Al Maktoum. Sheikh Maktoum gave his consent and Sheikh Mohammed immediately designated approximately 175 acres (71 ha) of sand dunes for the proposed golf course, clubhouse, majlis and maintenance area set just a few miles out of the city center.

The golf course complex was finished and, open for business in 1988. President Zia attended the opening and, was presented with a solid golf tee and a golf club with a gold shaft in order for him to hit the very first ball, for the club's opening, in front of a large crowd. The drive traveled about 200 yards (180 m) down the middle of the driving range. The opening was one of the last personal appearances President Zia made, as he was assassinated that same year when his plane exploded on takeoff in Pakistan.

== Events ==
The Dubai Desert Classic, a European Tour event with a US$3 million purse is an annual event played at by the club. The Omega Dubai Ladies Classic, a Ladies European Tour event, is also played at the club. The first Dubai Desert Classic event took place in 1989.

Lucas Herbert from Australia wins the final of the Omega Dubai Desert Classic at Emirates Golf Club on January 26, 2020.
