= Kirsty Taylor =

English professional golfer (born 1971)

Personal information
- Full name: Kirsty Anne Taylor
- Born: 18 June 1971 (age 55) Clitheroe, England
- Height: 1.65 m (5 ft 5 in)
- Spouse: Alastair Taylor (m. 1997)

Career
- Sport: Golf
- Turned professional: 1994
- Former tour: Ladies European Tour (joined 1995)
- Professional wins: 1

Number of wins by tour
- Ladies European Tour: 1

Best results in LPGA major championships
- Chevron Championship: DNP
- Women's PGA C'ship: DNP
- U.S. Women's Open: T35: 2003
- Women's British Open: T31: 2004

Kirsty Anne Taylor (born 18 June 1971) is an English professional golfer who played on the Ladies European Tour. She was runner-up at the 2000 Women's British Open and won the 2005 Wales Ladies Championship of Europe, and competed as Kirsty Speak before she married Alistair Taylor in 1997.

== Career ==
Taylor learned her golf at Clitheroe Golf Club where her parents Ted and Jean Anne Speak and her brother were also members. As an amateur, she was English Intermediate Champion 1992 and 1993, runner-up at the 1993 British Ladies Amateur Championship, and British Strokeplay Champion in 1994. She represented Great Britain & Ireland at the Curtis Cup and Vagliano Trophy.

In 2000, Taylor finished runner-up at the LPGA Tour co-sanctioned Women's British Open and at the Mexx Sport Open. She set a course record and Ladies European Tour record low round of eleven-under-par 61 to win the 2005 Wales Ladies Championship of Europe. In addition, in 2007, she was runner-up at the Catalonia Ladies Masters, Ladies English Open, De Vere Ladies Scottish Open and the Nykredit Masters, where she lost a playoff to Lisa Hall.

In 2008 she was due to partner with Trish Johnson at the Women's World Cup of Golf, but Danielle Masters attended as her replacement as she was diagnosed with a brain tumour. Taylor battled back after surgery and radiotherapy, but called time on her professional career. She signed up as an Ambassador for Golf Roots, a UK project to introduce youngsters from all backgrounds and abilities to golf.

== Amateur wins ==
- 1992 World University Golf Championship
- 1994 Ladies' British Open Amateur Stroke Play Championship

== Professional wins (1) ==
=== Ladies European Tour wins (1) ===
No.	Date	Tournament	Winning score	Margin of victory	Runners-up
1	14 Aug 2005	Wales Ladies Championship of Europe	−14 (61-68-70-75=274)	3 strokes	(England) Laura Davies (England) Trish Johnson

Ladies European Tour playoff record (0–1)

No.	Year	Tournament	Opponents	Result
1	2007	Nykredit Masters	(England) Lisa Hall (England) Kiran Matharu	Hall won on the first extra hole

== Team appearances ==
Amateur

- European Ladies' Team Championship (representing England): 1993
- Vagliano Trophy (representing Great Britain & Ireland): 1993 (winners)
- Curtis Cup (representing Great Britain & Ireland): 1994 (tie)
- Espirito Santo Trophy (representing Great Britain & Ireland): 1994
