= Catalonia Ladies Masters =

Professional golf tournament in Spain

Tournament information
- Location: Catalonia, Spain
- Established: 2004
- Tour: Ladies European Tour
- Format: Stroke play - 54 holes
- Month played: June
- Final year: 2007

Final champion
- (South Africa) Ashleigh Simon

The Catalonia Ladies Masters was a professional golf tournament on the Ladies European Tour that was held in Catalonia, Spain. It was first held in 2004 and dropped from the tour in 2008.

Karine Icher won the inaugural event on 17-under-par 190 with a score of 62-66-62 to break the existing record of 200 for a 54-hole LET event.

In 2007, Ashleigh Simon, at 18 years and 37 days, became the youngest ever professional winner of a Ladies European Tour event as she won at (−8) with 70-68-70.

The tournament was dropped from the tour in 2008 and was held as an unsanctioned Ladies European invitational event for 20 players. Rebecca Hudson, Paula Marti and Tania Elósegui finished 6 shots behind Lotta Wahlin

== Winners ==
=== LET unofficial event ===
Year	Course	Location	Winner	Margin of victory	Runners-up	Ref
2008	Empordà Golf Hotel & Spa	Gualta	(Sweden) Lotta Wahlin	6 strokes	(England) Rebecca Hudson (Spain) Paula Marti (Spain) Tania Elósegui	

=== LET event ===
Year	Course	Location	Winner	Score		Ref
2007	Club de Golf Masia Bach	Barcelona	(South Africa) Ashleigh Simon	208	−8	
2006	Club Golf D'Aro	Girona	(France) Gwladys Nocera	207	−9	
2005	Golf Platja de Pals	Girona	(France) Karine Icher	207	−12	
2004	Club de Golf Sant Cugat	Barcelona	(France) Karine Icher	190	−17	
