= Sophie Sandolo =

Italian professional golfer

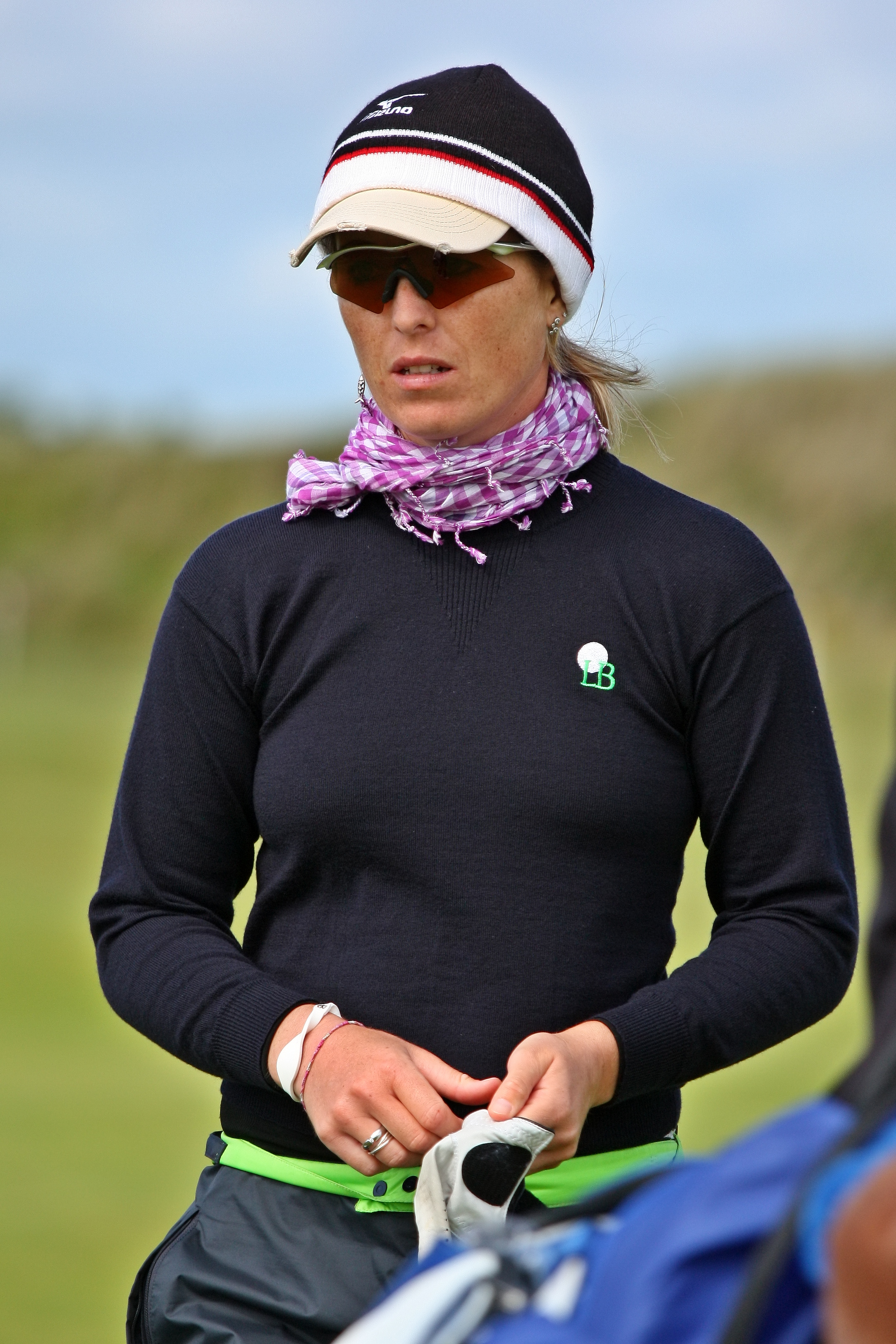
- Sandolo during 2010 Women's British Open

Personal information
- Nationality: Italy
- Born: 20 July 1976 (age 50) Nice, France
- Height: 1.71 m (5 ft 7 in)

Career
- Sport: Golf
- College: University of California, Los Angeles
- Turned professional: 1999
- Current tour: Ladies European Tour (joined 2000)
- Professional wins: 1

Best results in LPGA major championships
- Chevron Championship: DNP
- Women's PGA C'ship: DNP
- U.S. Women's Open: DNP
- Women's British Open: T22: 2005

Sophie Sandolo (born 20 July 1976) is an Italian professional golfer who plays on the Ladies European Tour.

== Early life and amateur career ==
In 1976, Sandolo was born Nice, France. She began playing golf at 14 and made the Italian national team by the age of 16.

Sandolo was Regional All-American while playing for the University of California, Los Angeles (UCLA). She won the European Ladies Amateur Championship in 1999 after being runner up in 1998. She also played on the Italian Espirito Santo Trophy team in 1996 and 1998, the team finishing in second place on both occasions.

== Professional career ==
She won her first professional event in 2006 at the Lalla Meryem Cup in Morocco. Her highest finish on the Ladies European Tour was 2nd at the 2005 Catalonia Ladies Masters. Her highest finish on the LET Order of Merit was 15th, also in 2005.

=== Modelling ===
Sandolo earned notoriety by publishing a calendar in 2005, in which she posed semi-nude. She has continued to release the calendar every year since. On the topic of the calendar, Sandolo has said, "My first sexy calendar is intended to represent my love for golf, my desire for freedom and a touch of coquetry and I’m instinctively attracted by fashion, elegance and glamour."

She is often invited on TV shows. She participated in a reality show called The Big Break: Ka'anapali on The Golf Channel.

== Team appearances ==
Amateur

- European Girls' Team Championship (representing Italy): 1993
- European Ladies' Team Championship (representing Italy): 1999
- Espirito Santo Trophy (representing Italy): 1996, 1998
