= Shipco Masters =

Tournament information
- Location: Kvistgård, Denmark
- Established: 2018
- Course: Simon's Golf Club
- Par: 72
- Length: 6,590 yards (6,030 m)
- Tour: European Senior Tour
- Format: Stroke play
- Prize fund: €350,000
- Month played: June
- Final year: 2018

Tournament record score
- Aggregate: 205 Colin Montgomerie (2018)
- To par: −11 as above

Final champion
- (Scotland) Colin Montgomerie

Location map
- Location in Denmark

The Shipco Masters was a men's professional golf tournament for players aged 50 and above which is part of the European Senior Tour. It was first held in June 2018 at Simon's Golf Club, Kvistgård, Denmark. It was the first European Senior Event to be held in Denmark since the 2007 Scandinavian Senior Open. The inaugural event was won by Colin Montgomerie.

The 2018 field included Laura Davies, who became the first woman to play in a European Senior Tour event. Davies was 8-over-par after 16 holes of her opening round but played the remaining 38 holes in level par to finish tied for 44th in the field of 60.

== Winners ==
Year	Winner	Score	To par	Margin of victory	Runners-up
2018	(Scotland) Colin Montgomerie	205	−11	3 strokes	(England) Paul Eales (England) Barry Lane
