= Nordic Open =

Golf tournament in Denmark

Tournament information
- Location: Copenhagen, Denmark
- Established: 2003
- Course: Simons Golf Club
- Par: 72
- Length: 7,026 yards (6,425 m)
- Tour: European Tour
- Format: Stroke play
- Prize fund: €1,600,000
- Month played: August
- Final year: 2003

Tournament record score
- Aggregate: 266 Ian Poulter (2003)
- To par: −22 as above

Final champion
- (England) Ian Poulter
- Location in Denmark

The Nordic Open was the first ever European Tour event in Denmark. The tournament was held at Simon's Golf Club in Humlebæk north of Copenhagen.

It was only held in 2003 with Ian Poulter as the winner. The tournament did not attract the audience that the promoters had expected, and a few days after the first tournament it went bankrupt.

== Winners ==
Year	Winner	Score	To par	Margin of victory	Runner-up
2003	(England) Ian Poulter	266	−22	1 stroke	(Scotland) Colin Montgomerie
