= Danish Ladies Masters =

Tournament information
- Location: Denmark
- Established: 2005
- Par: 72
- Tour: Ladies European Tour
- Format: Stroke play
- Prize fund: €200,000
- Final year: 2008

Tournament record score
- Aggregate: 273 Iben Tinning (2005); 273 Karen Margrethe Juul (2006)
- To par: −15 as above

Final champion
- (Germany) Martina Eberl

The Danish Ladies Masters, known for sponsorship reasons as the Nykredit Masters, was a women's professional golf tournament on the Ladies European Tour that took place in Denmark.

The tournament was first played in 2005 and the final edition was held in 2008.

In 2007, Lisa Hall won over Kirsty Taylor and Kiran Matharu on the first playoff hole for her third-career victory on the Ladies European Tour.

== Winners ==
Year	Venue	Winner	Winning score	To par	Margin of victory	Runner(s)-up	Ref
2008	Simon's Golf Club	(Germany) Martina Eberl	66-73-66=205^	–14	1 stroke	(England) Mel Reid	
2007	Helsingør Golf Club	(England) Lisa Hall	68-71-69-67=275	–9	Playoff	(England) Kiran Matharu (England) Kirsty Taylor	
2006	Odense Eventyr Golf	(Denmark) Karen Margrethe Juul	72-67-66-68=273	–15	4 strokes	(England) Laura Davies (England) Trish Johnson	
2005	Kokkedal Golfklub	(Denmark) Iben Tinning	70-68-70-65=273	–15	2 strokes	(England) Lora Fairclough	

^Reduced to 54-holes due to rain

== See also ==
- Danish Ladies Open
