= Anja Monke =

German professional golfer

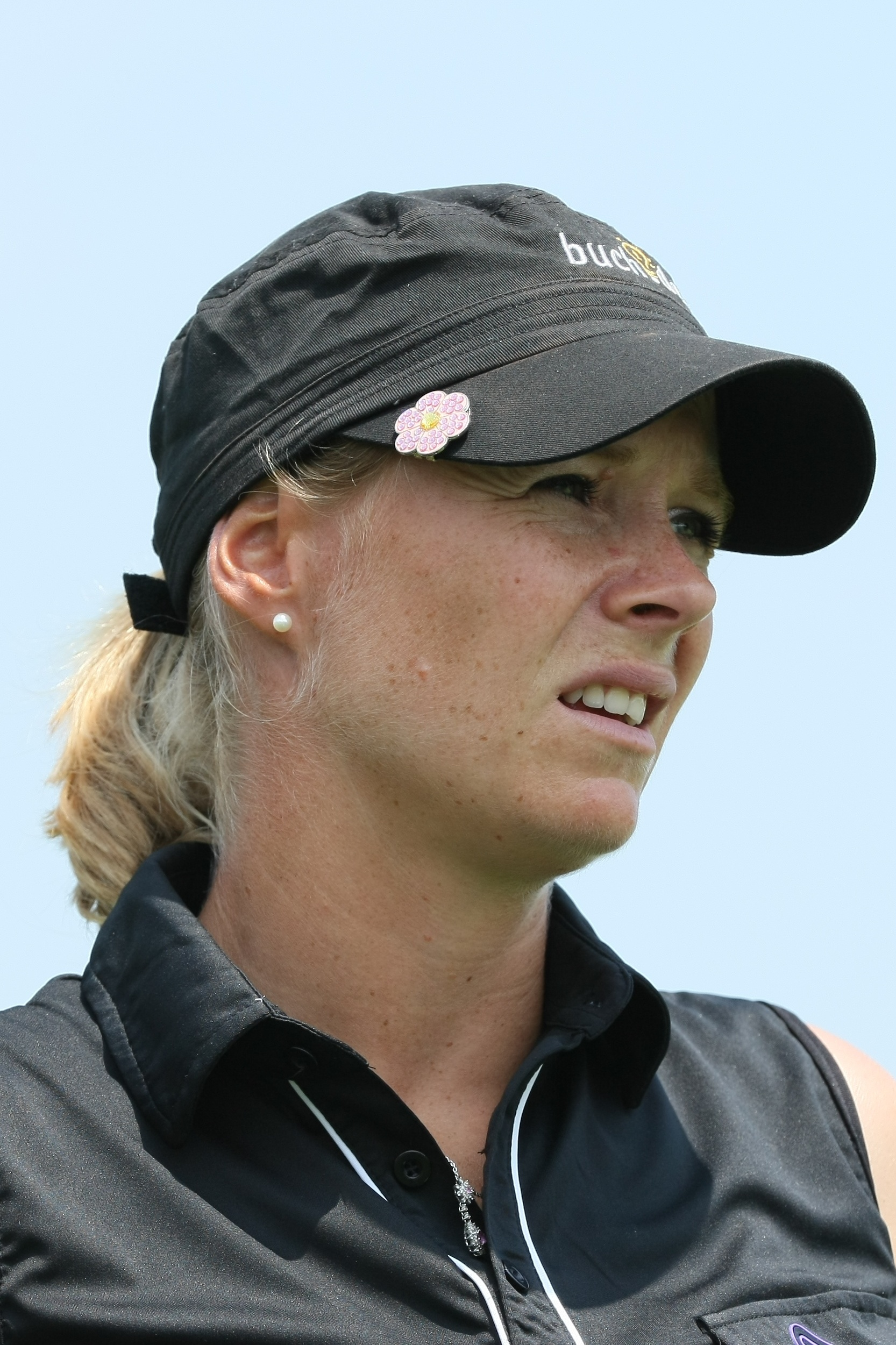
- Monke at the 2009 LPGA Championship

Personal information
- Nationality: Germany
- Born: 28 May 1977 (age 49) Herford, West Germany
- Height: 5 ft 9 in (1.75 m)

Career
- Sport: Golf
- Turned professional: 2003
- Current tours: Ladies European Tour (joined 2004); LPGA Tour (joined 2008)
- Professional wins: 3

Number of wins by tour
- Ladies European Tour: 3

Best results in LPGA major championships
- Chevron Championship: DNP
- Women's PGA C'ship: CUT: 2009
- U.S. Women's Open: CUT: 2009
- Women's British Open: T28: 2005

Achievements and awards
- German Ladies Amateur Golfer of the Year: 2003

Anja Monke (born 28 May 1977) is a German professional golfer. She has played on the Ladies European Tour since 2004.

Monke was born in Herford. In 2003, she won the International Amateur Championships of Switzerland and Italy, and was voted German Ladies Amateur Golfer of the Year. In Autumn, with a handicap of +3, she turned professional.

Monke played for Germany with Miriam Nagl in 2006 and Denise Simon in 2007 in the Women's World Cup of Golf in South Africa.

In September 2008, she won her first professional tournament, the Vediorbis Open de France Dames. She then qualified for the LPGA Tour and won the Dubai Ladies Masters in December 2008.

== Professional wins ==
=== Ladies European Tour (3) ===
- 2008 (2) Vediorbis Open de France Dames, Dubai Ladies Masters
- 2010 (1) Lalla Meryem Cup

== Team appearances ==
Amateur

- European Ladies' Team Championship (representing Germany): 2003

Professional

- World Cup (representing Germany): 2006, 2007
