= WPGA Championship of Europe =

Tournament information
- Location: France (1979); Scotland (1996–1999); Wales (2001–2010)
- Established: 1979
- Tour: Ladies European Tour
- Format: 72-hole Stroke play
- Final year: 2010

Tournament record score
- Aggregate: 274 Linda Wessberg, Kirsty Taylor
- To par: −16 Helen Alfredsson

Final champion
- (South Africa) Lee-Anne Pace

The WPGA Championship of Europe was a women's professional golf tournament on the Ladies European Tour.

The tournament was first played in 1979 in France, the first WPGA event held outside the United Kingdom. It was revived 1996 at Gleneagles in Scotland, titled the McDonald's WPGA Championship, and was the first event on the tour to be played solely for charity. Following the withdrawal of McDonald's as sponsors after just four years, there was a one-year break before the tournament returned to the tour in 2001 with a new home in Wales. It was last played in 2010.

== Winners ==
Year	Venue	Winner	Country	Score	Margin of victory	Runner(s)-up	Country
S4/C Wales Ladies Championship of Europe
2010	Conwy Golf Club	Lee-Anne Pace	South Africa	282 (−6)	3 strokes	Christel Boeljon	Netherlands
2010	Conwy Golf Club	Lee-Anne Pace	South Africa	282 (−6)	3 strokes	Melissa Reid	England
2009	Royal St. David's	Karen Stupples	England	276 (−12)	1 stroke	Amy Yang	South Korea
2008	Machynys Peninsula	Lotta Wahlin	Sweden	209 (−7)	Playoff	Martina Eberl	Germany
2007	Machynys Peninsula	Joanne Mills	Australia	282 (−6)	1 stroke	Bettina Hauert	Germany
2007	Machynys Peninsula	Joanne Mills	Australia	282 (−6)	1 stroke	Georgina Simpson	England
Wales Ladies Championship of Europe
2006	Machynys Peninsula	Linda Wessberg	Sweden	274 (−14)	1 stroke	Laura Davies	England
2005	Machynys Peninsula	Kirsty Taylor	England	274 (−14)	3 strokes	Laura Davies	England
2005	Machynys Peninsula	Kirsty Taylor	England	274 (−14)	3 strokes	Trish Johnson	England
Wales "Golf as it should be" Ladies Open
2004	Royal Porthcawl	Trish Johnson	England	277 (−15)	3 strokes	Iben Tinning	Denmark
2004	Royal Porthcawl	Trish Johnson	England	277 (−15)	3 strokes	Laura Davies	England
The Wales WPGA Championship of Europe
2003	Royal Porthcawl	Shani Waugh	Australia	286 (−6)	2 strokes	Becky Brewerton	Wales
2002	Royal Porthcawl	Åsa Gottmo	Sweden	285 (−7)	2 strokes	Maria Hjorth	Sweden
WPGA Championship of Europe
2001	Royal Porthcawl	Helen Alfredsson	Sweden	276 (−16)	4 strokes	Suzann Pettersen	Norway
2000: No tournament
McDonald's WPGA Championship
1999	Gleneagles (King's)	Laura Davies	England	280 (−8)	Playoff	Maria Hjorth	Sweden
1998	Gleneagles (King's)	Catriona Matthew	Scotland	276 (−12)	5 strokes	Helen Alfredsson	Sweden
1998	Gleneagles (King's)	Catriona Matthew	Scotland	276 (−12)	5 strokes	Laura Davies	England
McDonald's WPGA Championship of Europe
1997	Gleneagles (King's)	Helen Alfredsson	Sweden	276 (−12)	4 strokes	Charlotta Sorenstam	Sweden
1997	Gleneagles (King's)	Helen Alfredsson	Sweden	276 (−12)	4 strokes	Kathryn Marshall	Scotland
1996	Gleneagles (King's)	Tina Fischer	Germany	278 (−10)	1 stroke	Helen Wadsworth	Wales
1996	Gleneagles (King's)	Tina Fischer	Germany	278 (−10)	1 stroke	Charlotta Sorenstam	Sweden
1996	Gleneagles (King's)	Tina Fischer	Germany	278 (−10)	1 stroke	Trish Johnson	England
1996	Gleneagles (King's)	Tina Fischer	Germany	278 (−10)	1 stroke	Loraine Lambert	Australia
WPGA European Championship
1980–1995: No tournament
1979	Valbonne (France)	Susan Moon	United States	292 (+4)	2 strokes	Irene Koehler	West Germany
