= Lisa Hall (golfer) =

English golfer

Personal information
- Full name: Lisa Ann Hall (née Hackney)
- Nationality: England
- Born: 24 September 1967 (age 59) Skegness, Lincolnshire, England
- Height: 1.67 m (5 ft 6 in)
- Spouse: Martin Hall (m. 1998)

Career
- Sport: Golf
- College: University of Florida
- Turned professional: 1991
- Former tours: Ladies European Tour; LPGA Tour; Futures Tour
- Professional wins: 6

Number of wins by tour
- Ladies European Tour: 4
- Ladies Asian Golf Tour: 1
- Epson Tour: 1

Best results in LPGA major championships
- Chevron Championship: T5: 1997
- Women's PGA C'ship: T2: 1998
- U.S. Women's Open: T5: 1997
- du Maurier Classic: T9: 1997
- Women's British Open: T58: 2007

Achievements and awards
- Ladies Asia Golf Circuit Order of Merit winner: 1995
- LPGA Rookie of the Year: 1997

Lisa Ann Hall (born 24 September 1967), née Lisa Ann Hackney, is an English professional golfer who was previously a member of the LPGA Tour and currently plays on the Ladies European Tour.

== College career ==
Hall accepted an athletic scholarship to attend the University of Florida in Gainesville, Florida, United States, where she played for coach Mimi Ryan's Florida Gators women's golf team from 1987 to 1990. Following the 1990 season, she was recognized as the Southeastern Conference (SEC) Golfer of the Year, and was a first-team All-SEC selection and a second-team All-American. Hall graduated from the University of Florida with a bachelor's degree in sociology in 1990.

== Professional career ==
Hall turned professional on 8 January 1991, and joined the Ladies European Tour (LET) that year. In 1995 she won the Indonesia Open and topped the Kosaido Asian Circuit Order of Merit. She won her first LET title at the 1996 Women's Welsh Open and played for Europe in the Solheim Cup that year and for a second time in 1998. In 1997 she joined the United States–based LPGA Tour. She finished in the top ten in three of the four majors in her rookie season and was named Rookie of the Year. However, soon after that, she began to struggle and by 2005 had ceased playing tournament golf. In 2006, she made a comeback on the LET, and won the Northern Ireland Ladies Open in 2007. In 2008, she shot a final round 66 to win the ANZ Ladies Masters.

She married English-born professional golfer Martin Hall in 1998.

== Professional wins (6) ==
=== Ladies European Tour wins (4) ===
- 1996 Women's Welsh Open
- 2007 Northern Ireland Ladies Open, Nykredit Masters
- 2008 ANZ Ladies Masters

=== Futures Tour wins (1) ===
- 2002 Greater Kansas City FUTURES Charity Golf Classic

=== Ladies Asia Golf Circuit wins (1) ===
- 1995 Indonesia Ladies Open

== Team appearances ==
Professional

- Solheim Cup (representing Europe): 1996, 1998

== See also ==
- List of Florida Gators women's golfers on the LPGA Tour
- List of University of Florida alumni
