= Marta Prieto =

Spanish professional golfer

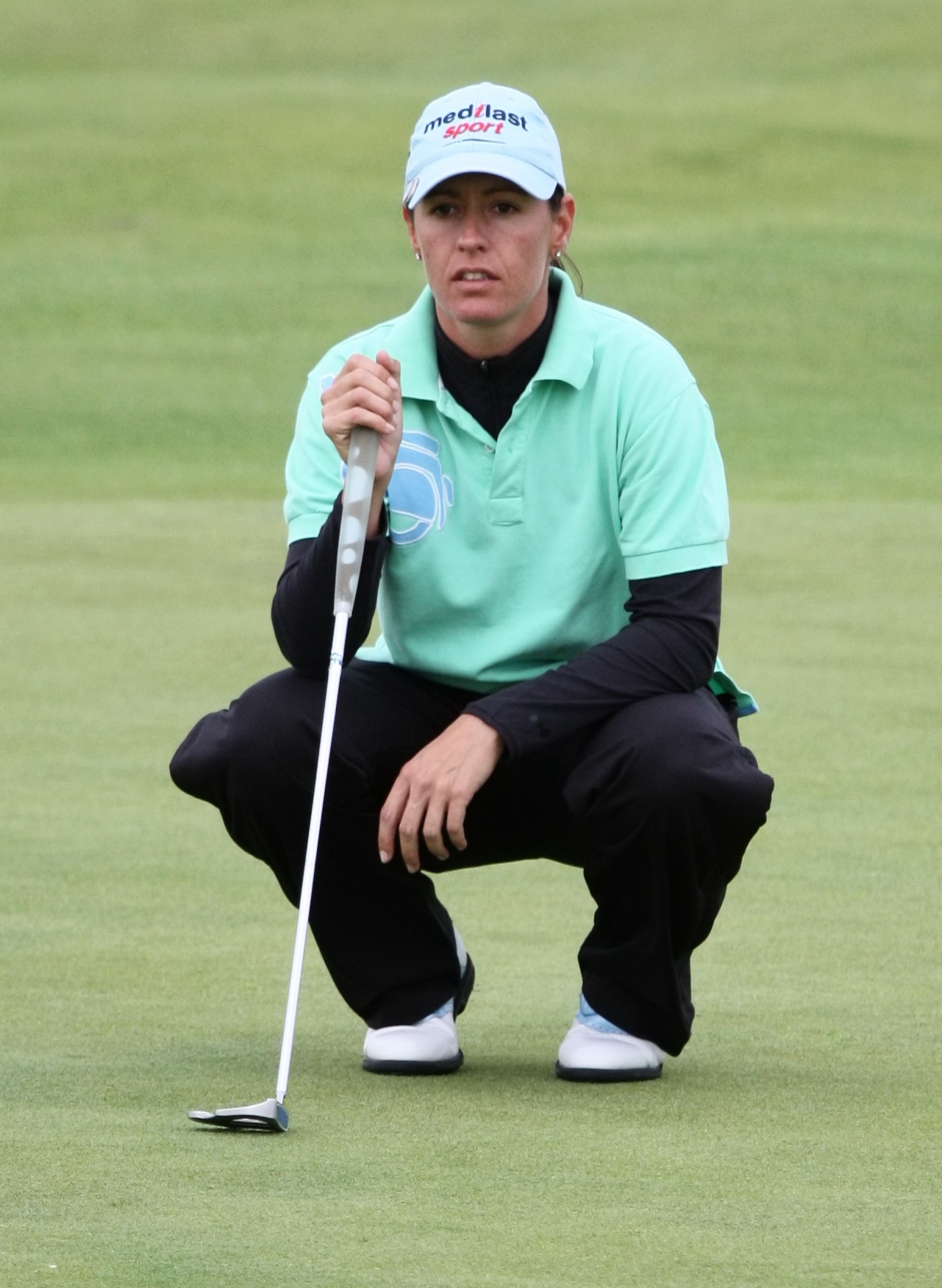
- Marta Prieto at the 2009 Women's British Open

Personal information
- Nationality: Spain
- Born: 11 September 1978 (age 48) Seville, Spain
- Height: 5 ft 6 in (1.68 m)

Career
- Sport: Golf
- College: Wake Forest University
- Turned professional: 2002
- Current tour: Ladies European Tour (joined 2003)

Best results in LPGA major championships
- Chevron Championship: DNP
- Women's PGA C'ship: DNP
- U.S. Women's Open: DNP
- Women's British Open: 66th: 2006
Medal record
Mediterranean Games
Gold medal – first place	2001 Tunis	Women's team
Silver medal – second place	2001 Tunis	Individual

Marta Prieto (born 11 September 1978) is a Spanish professional golfer from Seville, Spain who plays on the Ladies European Tour.

== Amateur career ==
Prieto was Spanish under-18 champion in 1995 and 1997 Spanish Amateur Champion and played her collegiate golf at Wake Forest University, North Carolina from which she graduated with a degree in economics. In her first year Prieto won the ACC Championship having led from start to finish to earn medalist honors and grabbed a share of the Rookie of the Year honor in addition to being a member of the All-ACC team. She was also named to the All-ACC team in her second year as well as gaining 1999 Golfweek/Sagarin All-Mid-Atlantic/East District second-team all-district honours.

In her junior year she finished 3rd at the NCAA Championships and as a senior was named National Golf Coaches Association (NGCA) 2001 All-America Second team and gained her third All-ACC team honours. Post graduation she won the 2001 British Ladies Amateur Championship and the 2002 Italian Ladies International Championship.

She represented Spain at the 2000 and 2002 Espirito Santo Trophy World Amateur Team Championship.

== Professional career ==
Prieto qualified for the 2003 Ladies European Tour by finishing second at the final Qualifyting tournament. Her best finish in her rookie season was a tie for third at the season ending Biarritz Ladies Classic. In 2004, she had three top ten finishes, the best being a runner's up spot at the KLM Ladies Open. She partnered Paula Martí at the 2006 Women's World Cup of Golf representing Spain.

== Team appearances ==
Amateur

- European Ladies' Team Championship (representing Spain): 1997, 1999, 2001
- Espirito Santo Trophy (representing Spain): 2000, 2002

Professional

- World Cup (representing Spain): 2006
