= Bettina Hauert =

German professional golfer

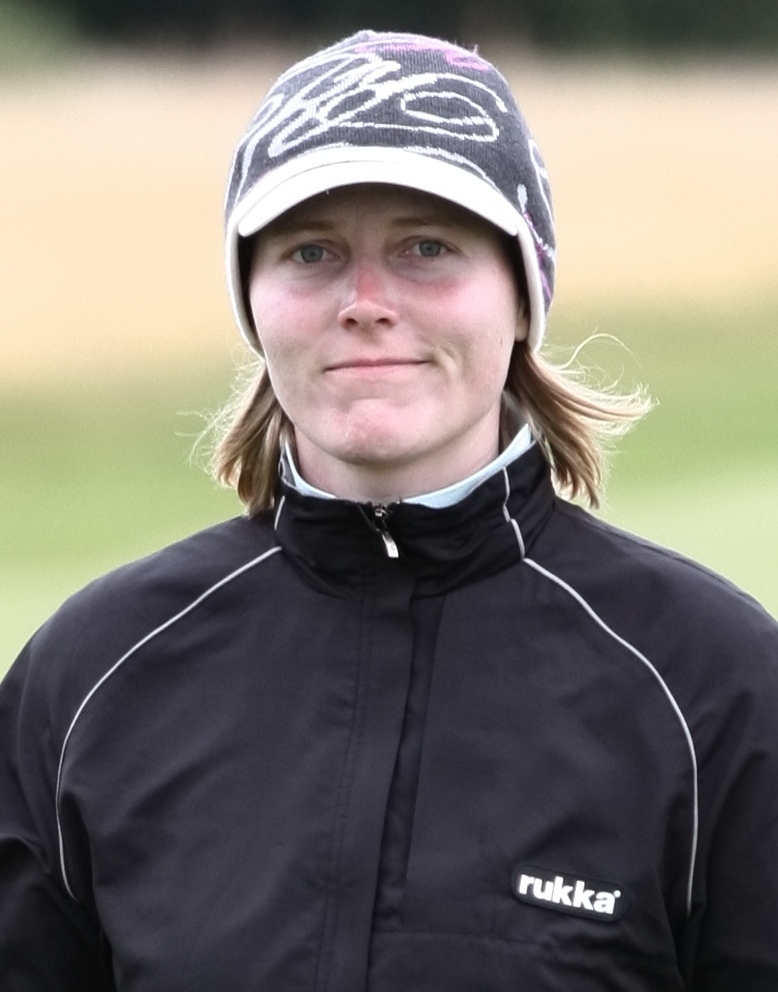
- Hauert at the 2009 Women's British Open

Personal information
- Nationality: Germany
- Born: 18 June 1982 (age 44) Hagen, West Germany
- Height: 5 ft 10 in (1.78 m)

Career
- Sport: Golf
- Turned professional: 2003
- Current tour: Ladies European Tour (joined 2004)
- Professional wins: 2

Number of wins by tour
- Ladies European Tour: 2

Best results in LPGA major championships
- Chevron Championship: CUT: 2008
- Women's PGA C'ship: DNP
- U.S. Women's Open: CUT: 2008
- Women's British Open: T47: 2004

Achievements and awards
- Ladies European Tour Player of the Year: 2007

Bettina Alexandra Hauert (born 18 June 1982) is a German professional golfer and member of the Ladies European Tour.

== Amateur career ==
Born in Hagen, Germany, Hauert was the individual champion at the 2003 Sherry Cup. She was also a member of the 2003 European team at the Vagliano Trophy.

== Professional career ==
Hauert won the Ladies European Tour qualifying school in 2003, and in 2004 became the first female golf professional to take a place alongside the men on the Playing Pro Team of the PGA of Germany. In her first three seasons on tour her best finish was a tie for seventh at the Scandinavian TPC hosted by Annika. She gained her first professional victory in a three-way playoff at the 2007 Deutsche Bank Ladies Swiss Open. and her second win at the Finnair Masters. After finishing 2nd at the Wales Ladies Championship of Europe, Hauert qualified for the 2007 Solheim Cup team. Following the 2007 season, she was voted the Ladies European Tour Player's Player of the Year, after finishing a close second to Sophie Gustafson in the Order of Merit.

== Professional wins (2) ==
=== Ladies European Tour wins (2) ===
- 2007 (2) Deutsche Bank Ladies Swiss Open, Finnair Masters

== Team appearances ==
Amateur

- European Ladies' Team Championship (representing Germany): 2003

Professional

- Solheim Cup (representing Europe): 2007
- World Cup (representing Germany): 2008

== Solheim Cup record ==
Year	Total matches	Total W-L-H	Singles W-L-H	Foursomes W-L-H	Fourballs W-L-H	Points won	Points %
Career	2	0–2–0	0–1–0	0–1–0	0-0-0	0	0%
2007	2	0–2–0	0–0–1 lost N. Castrale 3&2	0–1–0 lost w/I. Tinning 4&2	0-0-0	0	0%
