= Kristina Tucker =

Swedish golfer (born 1980)

Kristina Engström Tucker
Personal information
- Nationality: Sweden
- Born: 26 June 1980 (age 46) Stockholm, Sweden

Career
- Sport: Golf
- College: Duke University
- Turned professional: 2003
- Former tour: Symetra Tour (joined 2004)
- Professional wins: 2

Number of wins by tour
- Epson Tour: 1
- Other: 1

Best results in LPGA major championships
- Chevron Championship: DNP
- Women's PGA C'ship: DNP
- U.S. Women's Open: T20: 2006
- Women's British Open: DNP

Kristina Engström Tucker (born 26 June 1980) is a Swedish professional golfer who played mainly on the United States–based Futures Tour.

Tucker was born Kristina Engström in Stockholm and began playing golf at age 10. She won the Swedish Girls Championship back-to-back 1997 and 1998, and moved to the U.S. in 1999 to play at Duke University, where she won three collegiate tournaments, and even got to meet President George W. Bush at the White House after she and her teammates won the national championship her junior year. After graduating, Tucker returned to Sweden to play on the Telia Tour, where she won one event. In Sweden, Tucker attended the same high school as PGA Tour player Jesper Parnevik and had a class with Tiger Woods' wife, Elin Nordegren. Her husband Paul Tucker, whom she met at Duke, is a former professional player on the NGA Hooters Tour.

Tucker appeared on The Big Break V: Hawaii, the fifth edition of The Golf Channel's reality television competition program The Big Break. The show's premise is to award aspiring golf professionals exemptions into event on major tours, eliminating one contestant each week through a series of challenges until only one player is left. The Big Break V: Hawaii was filmed at the Turtle Bay Resort of Oahu's North Shore in October 2005, and the show premiered on The Golf Channel on in February 2006.

Tucker made the cut and ended up finishing in a 4-way tie for 20th at the 2006 U.S. Women's Open in Newport, Rhode Island, becoming the first-ever The Big Break-contestant to make a cut in an event on a tour offered as a prize.

In 2008, Tucker captured her first professional title in the United States at the El Paso Golf Classic, finishing at 11-under-par with a three-round total of 205 to earn the $11,900 winner's prize. She beat out Leah Wigger of Louisville, Kentucky, Sophia Sheridan of Guadalajara, Mexico, and Stella Lee of Seoul, South Korea, all at 8-under-par 208, by three shots for top honors. With the win, Tucker became the third Swede to win a Duramed Futures Tour title, where she played a total of 76 events between 2004 and 2009

== Professional wins ==
=== Symetra Tour (1) ===
No.	Date	Tournament	Winning score	Margin of victory	Runners-up
1	May 4 2008	El Paso Golf Classic	−11 (66-68-71=205)	3 strokes	(South Korea) Stella Lee, (Mexico) Sophia Sheridan, (United States) Leah Wigger

=== Swedish Golf Tour (1) ===
- 1999 Felix Finnish Ladies Open

== Team appearances ==
Amateur

- European Ladies' Team Championship (representing Sweden): 1999, 2001 (winners)
