= 2008 Ladies European Tour =

Series of golf tournaments

2008 Ladies European Tour season
- Duration: February 2008 – December 2008
- Number of official events: 30 (1 cancelled)
- Order of Merit: (France) Gwladys Nocera
- Player of the Year: (France) Gwladys Nocera
- Rookie of the Year: (England) Melissa Reid
- Lowest stroke average: (Norway) Suzann Pettersen

The 2008 Ladies European Tour was a series of golf tournaments for elite female golfers from around the world which took place from January through December 2008. The tournaments were sanctioned by the Ladies European Tour (LET).

The tour featured 28 official money events with prize money totalling more than €10.5 million, as well as the Women's World Cup of Golf and the European Ladies Golf Cup. Gwladys Nocera won the Order of Merit with earnings of €391,840, ahead of Helen Alfredsson, who finished second despite only having played in three events. Melissa Reid won Rookie of the Year honours, after finishing 12th in the Order of Merit.

== Tournament results ==
The table below shows the 2008 schedule. The numbers in brackets after the winners' names show the number of career wins they had on the Ladies European Tour up to and including that event. This is only shown for members of the tour.

Key

Major championships
LET majors in **bold**
Regular events
Team championships

Dates	Tournament	Location	Winner	Purse (€)	Notes
20 Jan	Women's World Cup of Golf	South Africa	(Philippines) Jennifer Rosales and Dorothy Delasin (n/a)	$1,400,000	Team event co-sanctioned by the five main women's tours; unofficial prize money
3 Feb	Women's Australian Open	Australia	(Australia) Karrie Webb (n/a)	A$400,000	Co-sanctioned by the ALPG Tour
10 Feb	ANZ Ladies Masters	Australia	(England) Lisa Hall (4)	A$480,000	Co-sanctioned by the ALPG Tour
6 Apr	European Ladies Golf Cup	Spain	(England) Trish Johnson and Rebecca Hudson	300,000	Team event; new in 2008; unofficial prize money
20 Apr	Open De España Femenino	Spain	(Sweden) Emma Zackrisson (1)	275,000	
3 May	Ladies Scottish Open	Scotland	(France) Gwladys Nocera (6)	200,000	
11 May	Turkish Ladies Open	Turkey	(Sweden) Lotta Wahlin (1)	250,000	New tournament
25 May	Ladies Swiss Open	Switzerland	(Norway) Suzann Pettersen (3)	525,000	
1 Jun	Ladies German Open	Germany	(South Korea) Amy Yang (2)	250,000	New tournament
8 Jun	Dutch Ladies Open	Netherlands	(France) Gwladys Nocera (7)	250,000	
15 Jun	Ladies Open of Portugal	Portugal	(France) Anne-Lise Caudal (1)	200,000	
22 Jun	Tenerife Ladies Open	Spain	(England) Rebecca Hudson (2)	300,000	
6 Jul	Ladies English Open	England	(England) Rebecca Hudson (3)	165,000	
13 Jul	Ladies Irish Open	Ireland	(Norway) Suzann Pettersen (4)	450,000	New tournament
20 Jul	BMW Ladies Italian Open	Italy	(Germany) Martina Eberl (2)	400,000	
27 Jul	**Evian Masters**	France	(Sweden) Helen Alfredsson (11)	$3,250,000	Co-sanctioned by the LPGA Tour
3 Aug	**Ricoh Women's British Open**	England	(South Korea) Jiyai Shin (n/a)	$2,100,000	Co-sanctioned by the LPGA Tour
10 Aug	Scandinavian TPC hosted by Annika	Sweden	(South Korea) Amy Yang (3)	200,000	
17 Aug	Wales Ladies Championship of Europe	Wales	(Sweden) Lotta Wahlin (2)	450,000	
24 Aug	SAS Masters	Norway	(France) Gwladys Nocera (8)	200,000	
31 Aug	Finnair Masters	Finland	(Finland) Minea Blomqvist (2)	200,000	
7 Sep	Nykredit Masters	Denmark	(Germany) Martina Eberl (3)	200,000	
14 Sep	Austrian Ladies Open	Austria	(England) Laura Davies (28)	250,000	
21 Sep	Göteborg Masters	Sweden	(France) Gwladys Nocera (9)	250,000	New tournament
28 Sep	Open de France Dames	France	(Germany) Anja Monke (1)	350,000	
4 Oct	Madrid Ladies Masters	Spain	(France) Gwladys Nocera (10)	400,000	
2 Nov	Suzhou Taihu Ladies Open	China	(Sweden) Annika Sörenstam (17)	200,000	Co-sanctioned by the Ladies Asian Golf Tour
16 Nov	Saint Four Ladies Masters in Jeju	South Korea	(South Korea) Hee-Kyung Seo (n/a)	500,000	Co-sanctioned by the LPGA of Korea Tour
~~6 Dec~~	Indian Ladies Masters	India	Cancelled		
14 Dec	Dubai Ladies Masters	United Arab Emirates	(Germany) Anja Monke (2)	500,000	

== Order of Merit rankings ==
Rank	Player	Country	Earnings (€)
1	Gwladys Nocera	France	391,840
2	Helen Alfredsson	Sweden	320,100
3	Martina Eberl	Germany	227,296
4	Amy Yang	South Korea	227,179
5	Anja Monke	Germany	184,779
6	Suzann Pettersen	Norway	183,279
7	Lotta Wahlin	Sweden	181,114
8	Paula Martí	Spain	162,698
9	Lisa Hall	England	157,289
10	Rebecca Hudson	England	145,276

== See also ==
- 2008 LPGA Tour
- 2008 in golf
